= 1994 Wimbledon Championships – Boys' singles =

Boys' singles
- 1994 Wimbledon Championships

Final
- Champion: (United States) Scott Humphries
- Runner-up: (Australia) Mark Philippoussis
- Score: 7–6^{(7–5)}, 3–6, 6–4

Events
Singles	men	women		boys	girls
Doubles	men	women	mixed	boys	girls
WC Singles	men	women	quad
WC Doubles	men	women	quad
Legends	men	women	seniors
← 1993 ·	Wimbledon Championships	· 1995 →

Scott Humphries defeated Mark Philippoussis in the final, 7–6^{(7–5)}, 3–6, 6–4 to win the boys' singles tennis title at the 1994 Wimbledon Championships.

== Seeds ==
1. (Ecuador) Nicolás Lapentti (first round)
2. (Australia) Ben Ellwood (quarterfinals)
3. (Australia) Mark Philippoussis (final)
4. (Israel) Eyal Erlich (second round)
5. (Argentina) Federico Browne (third round)
6. n/a
7. (Australia) Andrew Ilie (second round)
8. (Brazil) Gustavo Kuerten (first round)
9. (Mexico) Alejandro Hernández (third round)
10. (Italy) Giorgio Galimberti (third round)
11. (United States) Scott Humphries (champion)
12. (Paraguay) Ramón Delgado (first round)
13. (United States) Paul Goldstein (quarterfinals)
14. (Australia) James Sekulov (third round)
15. n/a
16. (Morocco) Mehdi Tahiri (quarterfinals)

Click on the seed number of a player to go to their draw section.

== Draw ==
=== Key ===
- Q = Qualifier
- WC = Wild card
- LL = Lucky loser
- Alt = Alternate
- SE = Special exempt
- PR = Protected ranking
- ITF = ITF entry
- JE = Junior exempt
- w/o = Walkover
- r = Retired
- d = Defaulted
- SR = Special ranking

=== Finals ===
Quarterfinals
13	(United States) Paul Goldstein	4	2
(United Kingdom) Jamie Delgado	6	6
3	(Australia) Mark Philippoussis	6	6
16	(Morocco) Mehdi Tahiri	1	2
(Slovakia) Vladimír Pláteník	6	6	2
11	(United States) Scott Humphries	7	4	6
(Netherlands) Sjeng Schalken	6	6
2	(Australia) Ben Ellwood	4	3

Semifinals
(United Kingdom) Jamie Delgado	3	1
3	(Australia) Mark Philippoussis	6	6
11	(United States) Scott Humphries	6	7
(Netherlands) Sjeng Schalken	4	6

Final
3	(Australia) Mark Philippoussis	6	6	4
11	(United States) Scott Humphries	7	3	6

=== Top half ===
==== Section 1 ====
First round
1	(Ecuador) Nicolás Lapentti	4	6	5
(Canada) Chris Santoso	6	3	7
(Slovakia) Dominik Hrbatý	4	6	2
(Argentina) Gustavo Cavallaro	6	4	6
(Czech Republic) Tomáš Zíb	7	6
(New Zealand) Teo Susnjak	5	4
(Mexico) Gerardo Venegas Escalente	3	5
13	(United States) Paul Goldstein	6	7
14	(Australia) James Sekulov	6	7
(Israel) Jonathan Erlich	1	5
(India) Amirben Barua	2	0
(Germany) Alex Bose	6	6
(United Kingdom) Jamie Delgado	5	7	6
(South Africa) Jeff Coetzee	7	6	4
(Japan) Takao Suzuki	6	6
8	(Brazil) Gustavo Kuerten	3	2

Second round
(Canada) C Santoso	6	7
(Argentina) G Cavallaro	3	5
(Czech Republic) T Zíb	6	0	4
13	(United States) P Goldstein	4	6	6
14	(Australia) J Sekulov	3	7	6
(Germany) A Bose	6	6	3
(United Kingdom) J Delgado	3	6	6
(Japan) T Suzuki	6	1	3

Third round
(Canada) C Santoso	6	3	4
13	(United States) P Goldstein	4	6	6
14	(Australia) J Sekulov	6	5	4
(United Kingdom) J Delgado	3	7	6

Quarterfinals
13	(United States) P Goldstein	4	2
(United Kingdom) J Delgado	6	6

==== Section 2 ====
First round
3	(Australia) Mark Philippoussis	6	6
(Sweden) Kalle Flygt	4	4
(United Kingdom) Jamie Williams	4	4
(Austria) Stefan Koubek	6	6
(United States) Ryan Wolters	7	6	6
(Czech Republic) Jiří Vaněk	6	7	4
(Slovakia) Tomáš Čatár	6	6
12	(Paraguay) Ramón Delgado	4	2
16	(Morocco) Mehdi Tahiri	6	6
(Japan) Yaoki Ishii	4	3
(New Zealand) Scott Clark	7	6	2
(Brazil) Ricardo Schlachter	6	7	6
(Mexico) Ricardo Rosas	4	6	6
(United Kingdom) Paul Martin	6	4	4
(Germany) Rainer Schüttler	7	6	2^{r}
(France) Jean-François Bachelot	5	7	4

Second round
3	(Australia) M Philippoussis	6	6
(Austria) S Koubek	2	2
(United States) R Wolters	4	3
(Slovakia) T Čatár	6	6
16	(Morocco) M Tahiri	6	6
(Brazil) R Schlachter	3	2
(Mexico) R Rosas	6	6
(France) J-F Bachelot	3	4

Third round
3	(Australia) M Philippoussis	6	6
(Slovakia) T Čatár	2	3
16	(Morocco) M Tahiri	7	7
(Mexico) R Rosas	6	6

Quarterfinals
3	(Australia) M Philippoussis	6	6
16	(Morocco) M Tahiri	1	2

=== Bottom half ===
==== Section 3 ====
First round
5	(Argentina) Federico Browne	7	6
(United Kingdom) Martin Lee	6	4
(South Korea) Lee Jong-min	6	7
(Bosnia and Herzegovina) Merid Zahirović	3	5
(Slovakia) Vladimír Pláteník	7	6
(Austria) Wolfgang Schranz	6	4
(Germany) Patrick Gottesleben	6	7
(Mexico) Fernando Sierra	2	5
11	(United States) Scott Humphries	6	6
(Sweden) Anders Stenman	2	4
(Brazil) Antonio Wuttke	6	3	5
(Hungary) Szilard Szirtesi	3	6	7
(New Zealand) Mark Nielsen	6	5	5
(Czech Republic) Radovan Chrz	1	7	7
(Chile) Juan Flores	1	6
4	(Israel) Eyal Erlich	6	7

Second round
5	(Argentina) F Browne	6	6
(South Korea) J-m Lee	2	1
(Slovakia) V Pláteník	6	1	6
(Germany) P Gottesleben	4	6	4
11	(United States) S Humphries	6	6
(Hungary) S Szirtesi	1	1
(Czech Republic) R Chrz	6	6
4	(Israel) E Erlich	4	4

Third round
5	(Argentina) F Browne	4	4
(Slovakia) V Pláteník	6	6
11	(United States) S Humphries	6	6
(Czech Republic) R Chrz	3	2

Quarterfinals
(Slovakia) V Pláteník	6	6	2
11	(United States) S Humphries	7	4	6

==== Section 4 ====
First round
7	(Australia) Andrew Ilie	6	6
(Peru) Carlos José Tori	4	3
(Netherlands) Sjeng Schalken	6	7
(Austria) Markus Hipfl	0	5
(Sweden) Nicklas Timfjord	7	6
(United Kingdom) Luke Milligan	5	1
(Federal Republic of Yugoslavia) Nenad Zimonjić	7	3	4
10	(Italy) Giorgio Galimberti	6	6	6
9	(Mexico) Alejandro Hernández	6	6
(Indonesia) Andrian Raturandang	2	4
(Brazil) Rodrigo Monte	5	7	9
(France) Jean-Noël Grinda	7	6	7
(Czech Republic) Jiří Hobler	6	4
(Slovakia) Roman Kukal	7	6
(Thailand) Paradorn Srichaphan	3	2
2	(Australia) Ben Ellwood	6	6

Second round
7	(Australia) A Ilie	6	7	3
(Netherlands) S Schalken	7	6	6
(Sweden) N Timfjord	6	6
10	(Italy) G Galimberti	7	7
9	(Mexico) A Hernández	6	6
(Brazil) R Monte	1	3
(Slovakia) R Kukal	5	3
2	(Australia) B Ellwood	7	6

Third round
(Netherlands) S Schalken	6	3	6
(Italy) G Galimberti	2	6	3
9	(Mexico) A Hernández	7	3	8
2	(Australia) B Ellwood	6	6	10

Quarterfinals
(Netherlands) S Schalken	6	6
2	(Australia) B Ellwood	4	3
