= Scott Clark =

Scott Clark may refer to:

- Scott Clark (BMX rider) (born 1962), American professional BMX racer
- R. Scott Clark (born 1961), American Reformed pastor and seminary professor
- Scott Clark (Santa Barbara), a fictional character on the American soap opera Santa Barbara
- Scott Clark (comics), American comic book artist
- Scott Clark (tennis) (born 1977), New Zealand tennis player
