= Roger Federer junior years =

Swiss tennis player early years

Swiss tennis player Roger Federer's main accomplishments as a junior player came at Wimbledon, where, in 1998, he won both the singles tournament over Irakli Labadze, in straight sets, and the doubles with Olivier Rochus, over the team of Michaël Llodra and Andy Ram, also in straight sets. In addition, Federer was a runner-up at the US Open Junior tournament in 1998, losing the final to David Nalbandian. Federer would go on to win four other junior singles tournaments in his career.

As a junior, Federer was also known as a "hot head" on court which is distinct from his adult image of cool and calm, and being a great on-court role model.

== Junior career ==
=== Background ===
Federer was almost four years old when Boris Becker, his childhood idol, won his first Wimbledon title in 1985. From then on, Federer watched "tennis matches on television for hours on end." Reflecting on his childhood, he said, "I liked tennis the best of all sports. It was always exciting and winning or losing was always in my hands." Soon after enrolling in school at the age of six, Federer became the best in his age group and trained three times a week in and around Basel. When he was eight, Federer joined a region-wide tennis group, where he first met Marco Chiudinelli, a "talented" boy who belonged to the nearby Basel Lawn Tennis Club; just a month younger than Federer. They quickly became friends, playing squash, table tennis, and football together, but were soon the 'black sheep' of the group, with one or the other often forced to sit on the sidelines for disciplinary reasons.

They first played each other at an official event called The Bambino Cup in Arlesheim when both were eight. "Back then we only played one long set of up to nine games", Chiudinelli recollects. "Things weren't going well for me at the beginning. I was behind 2–5 and I started to cry. We cried a lot back then even during the matches. Roger came up to me and tried to comfort me when we switched sides. He told me everything would be alright, and in fact, things got better. I took the lead 7–6 and noticed that the tide had turned. Then he began to cry and I ran up to him and give him encouragement and things went better for him. It was the only time I could beat him."

When he was 10, Federer began weekly private coaching with Adolf Kacovsky, a tennis coach at The Old Boys Tennis Club. "I noticed right away that this guy was a natural talent", said Kacovsky. "He was born with a racquet in his hand." At first, Federer received lessons only while part of a group, although "the club and I quickly noticed he was enormously talented. We began giving him private lessons that were partly funded by the club. Roger was a quick learner. When you wanted to teach him something new, he was able to pick it up after three or four tries, while others in the group needed weeks."

Federer began using the one-handed backhand from an early age not only because Kacovsky was a fan of it, but also because all of his childhood idols, Stefan Edberg, fellow German Boris Becker, and later Pete Sampras, used the one-hander too. From ages 8 to 10, Federer received group and individual training from Kacovsky. At age 10, Federer began being taught at the club by Australian former tennis player Peter Carter.

=== Swiss junior champion ===
In 1993, Federer won the U12 Swiss national junior championships in Lucerne. Becoming the best junior in the country helped him decide to become a professional tennis player, so he stopped playing football at age twelve to concentrate solely on tennis, where he felt he had more control over his victories or defeats, rather than relying on the performances of his teammates.

In 1995, at age 13, Federer won the U14 Swiss national junior championship and was chosen to train at the Swiss National Tennis Center in the French-speaking Écublens. In January 1997, at age 15, Federer won the U18 Swiss national championship.

=== ITF Junior Circuit ===
Federer joined the ITF junior tennis circuit in mid-1996, at the age of 14, and played his first match there at a grade-2 tournament in Switzerland. In May 1997, Federer won his first-ever ITF junior title in a second category tournament in Prato, defeating Luka Kutanjac in the final.

Federer began the 1998 season by winning a second-category tournament in Victoria, defeating Julien Jeanpierre in the final. This victory saw him become one of the favorites for the Australian Open junior event, but Federer was stopped in the semifinals by Jeanpierre. He then won another second category tournament, this time in Florence, defeating Filippo Volandri in the final.

His main accomplishments as a junior player came at Wimbledon in 1998, when he won both the boys' singles final over Irakli Labadze, in straight sets, and the doubles with Olivier Rochus, over the team of Michaël Llodra and Andy Ram, also in straight sets. Federer then reached the final of the US Open junior event, which he lost to David Nalbandian. In November, Federer went on a tour in the United States, where he participated in the under 18s category at the prestigious Eddie Herr International Junior Championships in Florida, and in the Junior Orange Bowl in Miami, winning the latter after beating Nalbandian in the semifinals and Guillermo Coria in the final. By the end of 1998 he attained the No. 1 junior world ranking and was awarded ITF Junior World Champion.

Despite having another year as a junior left to go (1999), Federer instead decided to play full-time on the ATP tour, thus ending his ITF junior career at the end of 1998 with a high ranking of No. 1 in singles and No. 7 in doubles (both attained on 31 December 1998) and a win–loss record of 78–20 in singles and 36–21 in doubles. In total, he won four ITF junior singles tournaments in his career.

== ITF Junior Circuit finals ==
=== Singles: 6 (5 titles, 1 runner-up) ===
2–1	Tier GA
0–0	Tier G1
3–0	Tier G2

Result	W–L	Date	Tournament	Tier	Surface	Opponent	Score
Win	1–0	May 1997	Prato Junior Tournament, Italy	G2	Clay	(Croatia) Luka Kutanjac	6–4, 6–0
Win	2–0	Jan 1998	Victoria Junior Championship, Australia	G2	Hard	(France) Julien Jeanpierre	6–4, 6–4
Win	3–0	Apr 1998	Florence International Tournament, Italy	G2	Clay	(Italy) Filippo Volandri	7–6, 6–3
Win	4–0	Jul 1998	Wimbledon, United Kingdom	GA	Grass	(Georgia (country)) Irakli Labadze	6–4, 6–4
Loss	4–1	Sep 1998	US Open, United States	GA	Hard	(Argentina) David Nalbandian	3–6, 5–7
Win	5–1	Dec 1998	Orange Bowl, United States	GA	Hard	(Argentina) Guillermo Coria	7–5, 6–3

=== Doubles: 4 (2 titles, 2 runner-ups) ===
1–0	Tier GA
1–0	Tier G1
0–2	Tier G2

Result	W–L	Date	Tournament	Tier	Surface	Partner	Opponents	Score
Loss	0–1	May 1997	Prato Junior Tournament, Italy	G2	Clay	(Japan) Jun Kato	(Belarus) Maxim Belski (Czech Republic) Tomas Hajek	2–6, 2–6
Loss	0–2	Apr 1998	Florence International Tournament, Italy	G2	Clay	(Japan) Jun Kato	(Italy) Filippo Volandri (Italy) Urus Vico	3–6, 1–6
Win	1–2	Jun 1998	LTA Junior Championships, United Kingdom	G1	Grass	(Belgium) Olivier Rochus	(France) Michaël Llodra (Israel) Andy Ram	3–6, 6–4, 7–5
Win	2–2	Jul 1998	Wimbledon, United Kingdom	GA	Grass	(Belgium) Olivier Rochus	(France) Michaël Llodra (Israel) Andy Ram	6–4, 6–4

==== All matches ====
Match	Tournament	Country	Start date	Entry	Type	I/O	Surface	Round	Opponent	Result	Score
1	Swiss Junior Tournament	Switzerland	7/15/1996	WC	JUN	Outdoor	Clay	R64	Lukas Rhomberg (AUT)	W	6–1, 6–0
2	Swiss Junior Tournament	Switzerland	7/15/1996	WC	JUN	Outdoor	Clay	R32	Marc–Olivier Baron (FRA)	W	7–6, 6–3
3	Swiss Junior Tournament	Switzerland	7/15/1996	WC	JUN	Outdoor	Clay	R16	Nathan Healey (AUS)	L	7–6, 4–6, 4–6
7	World Youth Cup Final	Switzerland	9/10/1996	DA	JUN	Outdoor	Clay	RR	Lleyton Hewitt (AUS)	W	4–6, 7–6^{(7–3)}, 6–4
8	World Youth Cup Final	Switzerland	9/10/1996	DA	JUN	Outdoor	Clay	RR	Febi Widhiyanto (INA)	L	5–7, 7–5, 5–7
9	World Youth Cup Final	Switzerland	9/10/1996	DA	JUN	Outdoor	Clay	RR	Vijay Kannan (IND)	W	6–0, 7–6^{(7–4)}
10	World Youth Cup Final	Switzerland	9/10/1996	DA	JUN	Outdoor	Clay	RR	Nahuel Fracassi (ITA)	W	3–6, 6–3, 6–1
14	Sunshine Cup	USA	12/12/1996	DA	JUN	Outdoor	Clay	RR	Petr Kralert (CZE)	L	6–1, 0–6, 1–6
15	Sunshine Cup	USA	12/12/1996	DA	JUN	Outdoor	Clay	RR	Adrián García (CHI)	W	5–7, 6–2, 6–2
16	Sunshine Cup	USA	12/12/1996	DA	JUN	Outdoor	Clay	RR	Balazs Vaci (HUN)	L	5–7, 2–6
17	Sunshine Cup	USA	12/12/1996	DA	JUN	Outdoor	Clay	RR	Han–Hui Tsai (TPE)	W	6–3, 6–0
18	Casablance Cup Qualifying	Mexico	12/18/1996	DA	JUN	Outdoor	Hard	R64	Angel Garcia–Lopez (MEX)	W	6–0, 6–1
19	Casablance Cup Qualifying	Mexico	12/18/1996	DA	JUN	Outdoor	Hard	R32	Jonathan Hauswaldt (MEX)	W	6–1, 6–1
20	Casablance Cup Qualifying	Mexico	12/18/1996	DA	JUN	Outdoor	Hard	R16	Gilberto Gutierrez (MEX)	W	6–1, 6–1
21	Casablanca Cup	Mexico	12/22/1996	QF	JUN	Outdoor	Hard	R64	Mathias Schwarzler (AUT)	W	6–3, 4–2, RET
22	Casablanca Cup	Mexico	12/22/1996	QF	JUN	Outdoor	Hard	R32	Sebastien Aickele (GER)	L	6–7, 6–3, 5–7
23	Coffee Bowl Qualifying	Costa Rica	12/28/1996	DA	JUN	Outdoor	Hard	R32	Bye	W	
24	Coffee Bowl Qualifying	Costa Rica	12/28/1996	DA	JUN	Outdoor	Hard	R16	Carlos Vargas (PAN)	W	6–2, 2–6, 6–0
25	Coffee Bowl	Costa Rica	12/30/1996	QF	JUN	Outdoor	Hard	R128	Bye	W	
26	Coffee Bowl	Costa Rica	12/30/1996	QF	JUN	Outdoor	Hard	R64	Federico Cardinali (ARG)	W	6–1, 6–1
27	Coffee Bowl	Costa Rica	12/30/1996	QF	JUN	Outdoor	Hard	R32	Diego Ayala (USA)	L	4–6, 1–6
28	International Junior Championships of Venezuela	Venezuela	1/6/1997	DA	JUN	Outdoor	Clay	R128	Goran Sterijovski (MKD)	W	6–3, 4–6, 6–1
29	International Junior Championships of Venezuela	Venezuela	1/6/1997	DA	JUN	Outdoor	Clay	R64	Jérôme Haehnel (FRA)	L	2–6, 4–6
30	City of Florence International Tournament	Italy	3/24/1997	DA	JUN	Outdoor	Clay	R64	Davide Bramanti (ITA)	L	4–6, 6–3, 6–7
31	Prato International Junior Tournament	Italy	5/5/1997	DA	JUN	Outdoor	Clay	R64	Giunior Ghedina (ITA)	W	6–2, 6–0
32	Prato International Junior Tournament	Italy	5/5/1997	DA	JUN	Outdoor	Clay	R32	Lovro Zovko (CRO)	W	6–4, 6–2
33	Prato International Junior Tournament	Italy	5/5/1997	DA	JUN	Outdoor	Clay	R16	Julien Jeanpierre (FRA)	W	6–3, 6–0
34	Prato International Junior Tournament	Italy	5/5/1997	DA	JUN	Outdoor	Clay	Q	Haris Basalic (BIH)	W	6–3, 7–6
35	Prato International Junior Tournament	Italy	5/5/1997	DA	JUN	Outdoor	Clay	S	Ivan Beroš (CRO)	W	6–2, 6–3
36	Prato International Junior Tournament	Italy	5/5/1997	DA	JUN	Outdoor	Clay	F	Luka Kutanjac (CRO)	W	6–4, 6–0
37	Italian Junior Championships, Qualifying	Italy	5/17/1997	DA	JUN	Outdoor	Clay	R64	Diego de Vecchis (ITA)	W	6–4, 1–6, 7–6
38	Italian Junior Championships, Qualifying	Italy	5/17/1997	DA	JUN	Outdoor	Clay	R32	Davor Grgic (CRO)	W	6–1, 3–6, 6–2
39	Italian Junior Championships, Qualifying	Italy	5/17/1997	DA	JUN	Outdoor	Clay	R16	Tomas Zivincek (GER)	W	3–6, 6–0, 6–3
40	Italian Junior Championships	Italy	5/19/1997	QF	JUN	Outdoor	Clay	R64	Wesley Whitehouse (RSA)	W	6–3, 6–3
41	Italian Junior Championships	Italy	5/19/1997	QF	JUN	Outdoor	Clay	R32	Filip Aniola (POL)	W	5–7, 6–4, 7–5
42	Italian Junior Championships	Italy	5/19/1997	QF	JUN	Outdoor	Clay	R16	Nicolás Massú (CHI)	W	6–2, 4–6, 6–2
43	Italian Junior Championships	Italy	5/19/1997	QF	JUN	Outdoor	Clay	Q	Rodolfo Rake (PER)	L	1–6, 4–6
68	Eddie Herr International Junior Tennis Championships	USA	12/8/1997	DA	JUN	Outdoor	Clay	R128	Bye	W	
69	Eddie Herr International Junior Tennis Championships	USA	12/8/1997	DA	JUN	Outdoor	Clay	R64	Edgardo Massa (ARG)	L	3–6, 4–6
70	Victorian Junior Championships	Australia	1/9/1998	DA	JUN	Outdoor	Hard	R64	Adam Carey (AUS)	W	6–4, 6–2
71	Victorian Junior Championships	Australia	1/9/1998	DA	JUN	Outdoor	Hard	R32	Mathias Rekate (GER)	W	6–1, 6–0
72	Victorian Junior Championships	Australia	1/9/1998	DA	JUN	Outdoor	Hard	R16	Sadik Kadir (AUS)	W	7–5, 6–1
73	Victorian Junior Championships	Australia	1/9/1998	DA	JUN	Outdoor	Hard	Q	Olivier Rochus (BEL)	W	6–3, 4–6, 6–3
74	Victorian Junior Championships	Australia	1/9/1998	DA	JUN	Outdoor	Hard	S	Kristian Pless (DEN)	W	6–2, 6–2
75	Victorian Junior Championships	Australia	1/9/1998	DA	JUN	Outdoor	Hard	F	Julien Jeanpierre (FRA)	W	6–4, 6–4
76	Australian Hardcourt Junior Championships	Australia	1/18/1998	DA	JUN	Outdoor	Hard	R64	Dino Dattoli (AUS)	W	6–4, 3–6, 6–3
77	Australian Hardcourt Junior Championships	Australia	1/18/1998	DA	JUN	Outdoor	Hard	R32	David Martin (USA)	W	6–4, 6–2
78	Australian Hardcourt Junior Championships	Australia	1/18/1998	DA	JUN	Outdoor	Hard	R16	Olivier Rochus (BEL)	W	6–1, 7–6
79	Australian Hardcourt Junior Championships	Australia	1/18/1998	DA	JUN	Outdoor	Hard	Q	Christian–Michael Straka (GER)	W	6–1, 6–3
80	Australian Hardcourt Junior Championships	Australia	1/18/1998	DA	JUN	Outdoor	Hard	S	Julien Jeanpierre (FRA)	L	1–6, 4–6
81	Australian Open Junior Championships	Australia	1/26/1998	DA	JUN	Outdoor	Hard	R64	Nicholas McDonald (RSA)	W	6–3, 6–3
82	Australian Open Junior Championships	Australia	1/26/1998	DA	JUN	Outdoor	Hard	R32	Filippo Volandri (ITA)	W	6–4, 6–4
83	Australian Open Junior Championships	Australia	1/26/1998	DA	JUN	Outdoor	Hard	R16	Dino Dattoli (AUS)	W	6–3, 6–3
84	Australian Open Junior Championships	Australia	1/26/1998	DA	JUN	Outdoor	Hard	Q	Olivier Rochus (BEL)	W	7–5, 6–4
85	Australian Open Junior Championships	Australia	1/26/1998	DA	JUN	Outdoor	Hard	S	Andreas Vinciguerra (SWE)	L	6–4, 5–7, 5–7
91	City of Florence International Tournament	Italy	4/8/1998	DA	JUN	Outdoor	Clay	R64	Timo Nieminen (FIN)	W	6–1, 6–1
92	City of Florence International Tournament	Italy	4/8/1998	DA	JUN	Outdoor	Clay	R32	Dominik Meffert (GER)	W	6–4, 6–7, 7–6
93	City of Florence International Tournament	Italy	4/8/1998	DA	JUN	Outdoor	Clay	R16	Luben Pampoulov (AUT)	W	6–2, 6–4
94	City of Florence International Tournament	Italy	4/8/1998	DA	JUN	Outdoor	Clay	Q	Stefan Wauters (BEL)	W	6–2, 6–1
95	City of Florence International Tournament	Italy	4/8/1998	DA	JUN	Outdoor	Clay	S	Kristian Pless (DEN)	W	7–6, 6–3
96	City of Florence International Tournament	Italy	4/8/1998	DA	JUN	Outdoor	Clay	F	Filippo Volandri (ITA)	W	7–6, 6–3
98	Italian Junior Championships	Italy	5/18/1998	DA	JUN	Outdoor	Clay	R64	Flávio Saretta (BRA)	W	7–5, 6–1
99	Italian Junior Championships	Italy	5/18/1998	DA	JUN	Outdoor	Clay	R32	Jérôme Haehnel (FRA)	L	6–4, 5–7, 2–6
100	Belgian International Junior Championships	Belgium	5/25/1998	DA	JUN	Outdoor	Clay	R64	Bye	W	
101	Belgian International Junior Championships	Belgium	5/25/1998	DA	JUN	Outdoor	Clay	R32	Andy Ram (ISR)	W	6–1, 6–3
102	Belgian International Junior Championships	Belgium	5/25/1998	DA	JUN	Outdoor	Clay	R16	Simone Amorico (USA)	W	6–2, 6–3
103	Belgian International Junior Championships	Belgium	5/25/1998	DA	JUN	Outdoor	Clay	Q	Bob Borella (DEN)	L	4–6, RET
104	International Junior Championships of France	France	5/31/1998	DA	JUN	Outdoor	Clay	R64	Jaroslav Levinský (CZE)	L	4–6, 7–5, 7–9
105	LTA International Junior Championships	Great Britain	6/21/1998	DA	JUN	Outdoor	Grass	R64	Jakub Hasek (CZE)	W	4–6, 7–6, 6–3
106	LTA International Junior Championships	Great Britain	6/21/1998	DA	JUN	Outdoor	Grass	R32	Lee Childs (GBR)	W	6–1, 6–4
107	LTA International Junior Championships	Great Britain	6/21/1998	DA	JUN	Outdoor	Grass	R16	Edgardo Massa (ARG)	W	6–4, 7–5
108	LTA International Junior Championships	Great Britain	6/21/1998	DA	JUN	Outdoor	Grass	Q	Philipp Müllner (AUT)	W	6–1, 7–6
109	Italian Junior Championships	Great Britain	6/21/1998	DA	JUN	Outdoor	Grass	S	Taylor Dent (USA)	L	6–7, 6–4, 3–6
110	The Junior Championships, Wimbledon	Great Britain	6/27/1998	DA	JUN	Outdoor	Grass	R64	Philip Langer (AUT)	W	6–0, 6–2
111	The Junior Championships, Wimbledon	Great Britain	6/27/1998	DA	JUN	Outdoor	Grass	R32	Andrej Kračman (SLO)	W	7–6, 6–3
112	The Junior Championships, Wimbledon	Great Britain	6/27/1998	DA	JUN	Outdoor	Grass	R16	Jérôme Haehnel (FRA)	W	6–4, 6–4
113	The Junior Championships, Wimbledon	Great Britain	6/27/1998	DA	JUN	Outdoor	Grass	Q	David Sherwood (GBR)	W	7–6, 6–2
114	The Junior Championships, Wimbledon	Great Britain	6/27/1998	DA	JUN	Outdoor	Grass	S	Lovro Zovko (CRO)	W	7–5, 6–2
115	The Junior Championships, Wimbledon	Great Britain	6/27/1998	DA	JUN	Outdoor	Grass	F	Irakli Labadze (GEO)	W	6–4, 6–4
117	European Closed Junior Championships	Switzerland	7/20/1998	DA	JUN	Outdoor	Clay	R128	Bye	W	
118	European Closed Junior Championships	Switzerland	7/20/1998	DA	JUN	Outdoor	Clay	R64	Florin Nedelcu (ROU)	W	6–1, 6–1
119	European Closed Junior Championships	Switzerland	7/20/1998	DA	JUN	Outdoor	Clay	R32	Philipp Müllner (AUT)	W	6–2, 5–7, 6–3
120	European Closed Junior Championships	Switzerland	7/20/1998	DA	JUN	Outdoor	Clay	R16	Lazar Magdinčev (MKD)	W	6–2, 6–2
121	European Closed Junior Championships	Switzerland	7/20/1998	DA	JUN	Outdoor	Clay	Q	Kristian Pless (DEN)	W	3–6, 6–2, 6–3
122	European Closed Junior Championships	Switzerland	7/20/1998	DA	JUN	Outdoor	Clay	S	Feliciano López (ESP)	L	6–4, 2–6, 4–6
124	US Open Junior Championships	USA	9/6/1998	DA	JUN	Outdoor	Hard	R64	Boris Bachert (GER)	W	6–2, 6–2
125	US Open Junior Championships	USA	9/6/1998	DA	JUN	Outdoor	Hard	R32	Philip Langer (AUT)	W	6–3, 6–2
126	US Open Junior Championships	USA	9/6/1998	DA	JUN	Outdoor	Hard	R16	Olivier Rochus (BEL)	W	6–2, 7–5
127	US Open Junior Championships	USA	9/6/1998	DA	JUN	Outdoor	Hard	Q	Jérôme Haehnel (FRA)	W	7–5, 3–6, 6–1
128	US Open Junior Championships	USA	9/6/1998	DA	JUN	Outdoor	Hard	S	Kristian Pless (DEN)	W	6–3, 4–6, 6–3
129	US Open Junior Championships	USA	9/6/1998	DA	JUN	Outdoor	Hard	F	David Nalbandian (ARG)	L	3–6, 5–7
130	Toulouse Qualifying	France	9/26/1998	DA	TE	Indoor	Hard	R32	Marcello Wowk (ARG)	W	7–6, 6–2
131	Toulouse Qualifying	France	9/26/1998	DA	TE	Indoor	Hard	R16	Alex Rădulescu (GER)	W	7–6, 7–6
132	Toulouse Qualifying	France	9/26/1998	DA	TE	Indoor	Hard	Q	Olivier Delaître (FRA)	W	6–4, 6–4
153	Eddie Herr International Junior Tennis Championships	USA	11/30/1998	DA	JUN		Hard	R64	Matías Boeker (ARG)	W	6–0, 7–6
154	Eddie Herr International Junior Tennis Championships	USA	11/30/1998	DA	JUN		Hard	R32	Andrew McDade (RSA)	W	6–2, 6–2
155	Eddie Herr International Junior Tennis Championships	USA	11/30/1998	DA	JUN		Hard	R16	Éric Prodon (FRA)	L	4–6, 6–3, 3–6
156	Sunshine Cup	USA	12/8/1998	DA	JUN	Outdoor	Hard	RR	Juan Carlos Ferrero (ESP)	W	6–2, 6–3
157	Sunshine Cup	USA	12/8/1998	DA	JUN	Outdoor	Hard	RR	Andreas Vinciguerra (SWE)	W	7–6, 6–4
158	Orange Bowl Tennis Championships	USA	12/13/1998	DA	JUN	Outdoor	Hard	R64	Raimonds Sproga (LAT)	W	5–7, 7–6, 6–0
159	Orange Bowl Tennis Championships	USA	12/13/1998	DA	JUN	Outdoor	Hard	R32	Jürgen Melzer (AUT)	W	6–3, 6–1
160	Orange Bowl Tennis Championships	USA	12/13/1998	DA	JUN	Outdoor	Hard	R16	Ivan Cinkuš (CRO)	W	6–0, 6–1
161	Orange Bowl Tennis Championships	USA	12/13/1998	DA	JUN	Outdoor	Hard	Q	Ricardo Mello (BRA)	W	7–5, 6–4
162	Orange Bowl Tennis Championships	USA	12/13/1998	DA	JUN	Outdoor	Hard	S	David Nalbandian (ARG)	W	6–4, 6–2
163	Orange Bowl Tennis Championships	USA	12/13/1998	DA	JUN	Outdoor	Hard	F	Guillermo Coria (ARG)	W	7–5, 6–3

== See also ==
- Roger Federer
- Roger Federer career statistics
