= Vladimír Pláteník =

Slovakian tennis player and coach (born 1976)

- Country (sports): Slovakia
- Residence: Bratislava, Slovakia
- Born: 18 February 1976 (age 49) Bratislava, Czechoslovakia (now Slovakia)
- Height: 6 ft 1 in (1.85 m)
- Turned pro: 1994
- Retired: 2000
- Plays: Right (one-handed backhand)
- College: University of Comenius, Bratislava
- Prize money: $16,656

Singles
- Career record: 0–0
- Career titles: 0; 0 Challenger, 1 Futures
- Highest ranking: No. 392 (5 August 1996)

Doubles
- Career record: 0–0
- Career titles: 0; 0 Challenger, 4 Futures
- Highest ranking: No. 273 (13 September 1999)

Vladimír Pláteník (born 18 February 1976) is a tennis coach and former professional tennis player from Slovakia.

Pláteník is currently a head coach at the international EMPIRE Tennis Academy in Trnava, Slovakia where he worked with Daria Kasatkina. He is also the former coach of Dominika Cibulková, the 2014 Australian Open finalist. Pláteník was coaching her from 2007 to 2009 when she reached the semifinals of the French Open in 2009. In the quarterfinals, she defeated Maria Sharapova 6–0, 6–2. On 6 July 2009 she reached No. 12 in the WTA rankings. He was the coach of Anna Blinkova. He was also the coach of Veronika Kudermetova since 2021. He currently coaches Lulu Sun since 2024.

A native of Bratislava, he is the vice president of the Professional Tennis Coaches Association for Slavic countries and a PTCA-certified coach.

== Junior Grand Slam finals ==
=== Doubles: 1 (runner-up) ===
Result	Year	Tournament	Surface	Partner	Opponents	Score
Loss	1994	Wimbledon	Grass	(United Kingdom) Jamie Delgado	(Australia) Ben Ellwood (Australia) Mark Philippoussis	5–7, 6–7

== ATP Challenger and ITF Futures finals ==
=== Singles: 1 (1–0) ===
Legend ATP Challenger (0–0) ITF Futures (1–0)	Finals by surface Hard (0–0) Clay (1–0)

Result	W–L	Date	Tournament	Tier	Surface	Opponent	Score
Win	1–0	Jul 1998	Croatia F2, Mali Lošinj	Futures	Clay	(Czech Republic) Václav Roubíček	6–1, 6–0

=== Doubles: 9 (4–5) ===
Legend ATP Challenger (0–0) ITF Futures (4–5)	Finals by surface Hard (0–1) Clay (4–4)

Result	W–L	Date	Tournament	Tier	Surface	Partner	Opponents	Score
Loss	0–1	May 1998	Yugoslavia F3, Belgrade	Futures	Clay	(Australia) Joseph Sirianni	(Czech Republic) Daniel Fiala (Australia) Dejan Petrovic	3–6, 7–5, 3–6
Win	1–1	Jul 1998	Croatia F2, Mali Lošinj	Futures	Clay	(Croatia) Luka Kutanjac	(Croatia) Goran Orešić (Croatia) Ivan Vajda	walkover
Loss	1–2	Jul 1998	Slovenia F1, Kranj	Futures	Clay	(Slovakia) Boris Borgula	(Czech Republic) Leoš Friedl (Czech Republic) Petr Kovačka	3–6, 3–6
Loss	1–3	Oct 1998	Uzbekistan F4, Fergana	Futures	Hard	(New Zealand) Mark Nielsen	(Uzbekistan) Oleg Ogorodov (Uzbekistan) Dmitriy Tomashevich	walkover
Win	2–3	Jun 1999	Hungary F1, Budapest	Futures	Clay	(Slovakia) Martin Hromec	(Hungary) Gergely Kisgyörgy (Hungary) Peter Madarassy	7–5, 6–4
Win	3–3	Jul 1999	Greece F5, Thessaloniki	Futures	Clay	(Slovakia) Martin Hromec	(Australia) Michael Logarzo (Australia) Joseph Sirianni	7–5, 4–6, 6–2
Loss	3–4	Jul 1999	Slovenia F1, Kranj	Futures	Clay	(Slovakia) Tomáš Čatár	(Czech Republic) Leoš Friedl (Czech Republic) Petr Kovačka	7–5, 2–6, 4–6
Loss	3–5	Sep 1999	Turkey F5, Antalya	Futures	Clay	(Slovakia) Martin Hromec	(Israel) Amir Hadad (Israel) Andy Ram	4–6, 4–6
Win	4–5	Jul 2000	Hungary F5, Budapest	Futures	Clay	(Israel) Amir Hadad	(New Zealand) Lee Radovanovich (Brazil) Rodrigo Ribeiro	6–2, 6–7^{(2–7)}, 6–4
