= Lee Jong-min =

Lee Jong-min (Korean: 이종민) is a Korean name consisting of the family name Lee and the given name Jong-min. It may refer to:

- Lee Jong-min (swimmer) (born 1982)
- Lee Jong-min (footballer, born 1983)
- Lee Jong-min (tennis) (born 1977)
- Lee Jong-min (born 1988), birth name of South Korean singer Babylon
