= Igor Šarić =

Croatian tennis player (born 1967)

- Full name: Igor Šarić
- Country (sports): Yugoslavia; Croatia
- Born: 4 July 1967 (age 59) Zagreb, SR Croatia
- Prize money: $49,842

Singles
- Career record: 3–3
- Career titles: 0
- Highest ranking: No. 218 (12 June 1995)

Doubles
- Career record: 2–8
- Career titles: 0
- Highest ranking: No. 311 (15 November 1993)
Medal record
Representing Yugoslavia
Summer Universiade
Silver medal – second place	1987 Zagreb	Singles
Bronze medal – third place	1987 Zagreb	Doubles

Igor Šarić (born 4 July 1967) is a former professional tennis player from Croatia.

== Biography ==
Born in Zagreb, Šarić competed for Yugoslavia at the start of his career and played his first Grand Prix tournament at the Stuttgart Open in 1986. Ranked 800 in the world, he was given a wild-card into the tournament because he played for a local club and caused an upset by beating American Brian Teacher to make the second round. He represented Yugoslavia at the 1987 Summer Universiade in Zagreb and won a silver medal in the men's singles, after losing the gold medal match to another Croatian born Yugoslav player Bruno Orešar. In 1993 he featured in the main draw of the Romanian Open, the only other time he played singles in what had by then become the ATP Tour. He was beaten in the first round by Thomas Muster, in a three-set match. More prominent on tour as a doubles player, his ATP Tour appearances include the quarter-finals of the 1996 Croatian Indoors as a lucky loser, with partner Goran Orešić.

Šarić played representative tennis for Croatia in both the Davis Cup and World Team Cup. In 1994 he was a member of the Croatia Davis Cup team that defeated Portugal in a qualifier which secured them a spot in the World Group. His only match in the tie was the opening rubber and he beat Nuno Marques in five sets. His reverse singles against Emanuel Couto was abandoned in the second set due to rain. At the 1995 World Team Cup he played the doubles when Croatia played Russia. Teammates Goran Ivanišević and Saša Hiršzon were favoured in the other fixtures and the Croatian side finished the tournament as runners-up to Sweden. He played Davis Cup once more in 1996, for a tie against Ukraine. Again used in the singles, Šarić defeated Victor Trotsko. This was his final Davis Cup match, meaning he finished with a 100% winning record in the competition.

Since retiring he has remained involved in tennis as a coach and early in this career coached Željko Krajan. In 2002 he was based in Australia and during this time coached Iva Majoli while she was in the country for the Australian Open. He has also been coach of Antonio Veić and briefly in 2009 was both an assistant and fitness coach for Dinara Safina.

Saric, who now works as an assistant coach of the Croatian Davis Cup team, was a national junior coach with the Croatian Tennis Association for many years.

== See also ==
- List of Croatia Davis Cup team representatives
