= Ricardo Schlachter =

Brazilian tennis player

- Full name: Ricardo Schlachter
- Country (sports): Brazil
- Born: 7 July 1977 (age 47); Joinville, Brazil
- Turned pro: 1998
- Plays: Right-handed
- Prize money: $86,503

Singles
- Career record: 0–1
- Career titles: 0; 0 Challenger, 3 Futures
- Highest ranking: No. 260 (9 November 1998)

Grand Slam singles results
- Australian Open: Q1 (1999)
- Wimbledon: Q1 (1999)

Doubles
- Career record: 0–3
- Career titles: 0; 2 Challenger, 14 Futures
- Highest ranking: No. 161 (15 July 2002)
- Last updated on: 9 June 2023.

Ricardo Schlachter (born 7 July 1977) is a former professional tennis player from Brazil.

== Biography ==
As a junior, Schlachter was runner-up in the boys' doubles at the 1994 Wimbledon Championships, with Vladimír Pláteník as his partner.

Schlachter, who comes from the city of Joinville in Santa Catarina State, turned professional in 1998 and that year qualified for the singles main draw at the Colombia Open. His other ATP Tour main draw appearances were all in doubles, partnering Gustavo Kuerten at the 1998 Movistar Open, then competing twice at the Brasil Open, in 2001 and 2002. He won two doubles titles on the ATP Challenger Tour.

== Junior Grand Slam finals ==
=== Doubles: 1 (1 runner-up) ===
Result	Year	Tournament	Surface	Partner	Opponents	Score
Loss	1994	Wimbledon	Grass	(Slovakia) Vladimir Platenik	(Australia) Ben Ellwood (Australia) Mark Philippoussis	3–6, 4–6

== ATP Challenger and ITF Futures finals ==
=== Singles: 8 (3–5) ===
Legend ATP Challenger (0–0) ITF Futures (3–5)	Finals by surface Hard (0–1) Clay (3–4) Grass (0–0) Carpet (0–0)

Result	W–L	Date	Tournament	Tier	Surface	Opponent	Score
Win	1–0	Apr 1998	Argentina F1, Buenos Aires	Futures	Clay	(Argentina) Agustín Garizzio	6–0, 6–1
Win	2–0	May 1998	Argentina F2, Mendoza	Futures	Clay	(Peru) Alejandro Aramburú Acuna	7–5, 6–7, 6–4
Win	3–0	May 1998	Germany F7, Augsburg	Futures	Clay	(Poland) Bartlomiej Dabrowski	1–6, 6–2, 6–1
Loss	3–1	Jul 1999	Uruguay F1, Montevideo	Futures	Clay	(Argentina) Walter Grinovero	1–6, 3–6
Loss	3–2	Dec 1999	Brazil F2, Rio de Janeiro	Futures	Clay	(Croatia) Ivan Beros	3–6, 6–4, 5–7
Loss	3–3	Jul 2001	Brazil F5, Curitiba	Futures	Clay	(Argentina) Diego Veronelli	1–6, 3–6
Loss	3–4	Nov 2001	Brazil F10, Aracaju	Futures	Hard	(Brazil) Pedro Braga	1–6, 4–6
Loss	3–5	May 2002	USA F10, Vero Beach	Futures	Clay	(Azerbaijan) Emin Agaev	6–4, 1–6, 6–7^{(4–7)}

=== Doubles: 31 (16–15) ===
Legend ATP Challenger (2–5) ITF Futures (14–10)	Finals by surface Hard (1–5) Clay (15–10) Grass (0–0) Carpet (0–0)

Result	W–L	Date	Tournament	Tier	Surface	Partner	Opponents	Score
Win	1–0	Feb 1998	Ghana F2, Accra	Futures	Clay	(Argentina) Carlos Gómez Diaz	(Germany) Lars Kirschner (Germany) Wolfgang Winkler	6–2, 6–2
Loss	1–1	Mar 1998	Togo F1, Lomé	Futures	Hard	(Moldova) Joan Jimenez-Guerra	(Hungary) Peter Madarassy (Australia) Steven Randjelovic	6–7, 4–6
Loss	1–2	Apr 1998	Argentina F1, Buenos Aires	Futures	Clay	(Brazil) Antonio Prieto	(Brazil) Cristiano Testa (Brazil) João Zwetsch	3–6, 2–6
Loss	1–3	May 1998	Argentina F2, Mendoza	Futures	Clay	(Brazil) Antonio Prieto	(Brazil) Cristiano Testa (Brazil) João Zwetsch	3–6, 4–6
Loss	1–4	Aug 1998	Brazil F2, Campos do Jordão	Futures	Hard	(Japan) Thomas Shimada	(Brazil) Nelson Aerts (Brazil) Cristiano Testa	4–6, 6–3, 4–6
Loss	1–5	Dec 1998	Santiago, Chile	Challenger	Clay	(Chile) Hermes Gamonal	(Italy) Enzo Artoni (Argentina) Federico Browne	2–6, 4–6
Loss	1–6	May 1999	Germany F2, Schwäbisch Hall	Futures	Clay	(Argentina) Andrés Schneiter	(Uzbekistan) Oleg Ogorodov (Russia) Vladimir Voltchkov	3–6, 6–4, 6–7
Loss	1–7	Aug 1999	Gramado, Brazil	Challenger	Hard	(Paraguay) Paulo Carvallo	(Brazil) Antonio Prieto (Brazil) Alexandre Simoni	1–6, 4–6
Win	2–7	Nov 1999	Argentina F5, Lanús	Futures	Clay	(Brazil) Marcos Daniel	(Italy) Enzo Artoni (Argentina) Andrés Schneiter	7–6, 6–7, 6–3
Win	3–7	Dec 1999	Brazil F2, Rio de Janeiro	Futures	Clay	(Brazil) Leandro Rosa	(Brazil) Flávio Saretta (Brazil) Leonardo Silva	6–2, 6–0
Win	4–7	Mar 2000	Argentina F2, Córdoba	Futures	Clay	(Brazil) Márcio Carlsson	(Uruguay) Alejandro Olivera (Austria) Wolfgang Schranz	5–7, 6–4, 7–6^{(8–6)}
Win	5–7	Oct 2000	Brazil F2, Florianópolis	Futures	Clay	(Brazil) Márcio Carlsson	(Argentina) Martín Vassallo Argüello (Argentina) Diego Veronelli	2–6, 6–3, 6–4
Loss	5–8	Oct 2000	Paraguay F1, Asunción	Futures	Clay	(Brazil) Márcio Carlsson	(Argentina) Juan Pablo Brzezicki (Switzerland) Cristian Villagrán	5–7, 3–6
Loss	5–9	Nov 2000	Chile F7, Valparaíso	Futures	Clay	(Brazil) Márcio Carlsson	(Chile) Jaime Fillol (Argentina) Ignacio González King	4–6, 7–6^{(7–4)}, 5–7
Win	6–9	Dec 2000	Chile F8, Valparaíso	Futures	Clay	(Chile) Juan-Felipe Yáñez	(Chile) Hermes Gamonal (Chile) Phillip Harboe	3–6, 7–5, 6–3
Win	7–9	Apr 2001	Argentina F3, Santa Fe	Futures	Clay	(Brazil) Bruno Soares	(Argentina) Leonardo Olguín (Argentina) Marcello Wowk	7–6^{(7–3)}, 4–6, 6–3
Win	8–9	Apr 2001	Brazil F2, Teresópolis	Futures	Clay	(Brazil) Márcio Carlsson	(Uruguay) Federico Dondo (Peru) Iván Miranda	6–1, 6–4
Win	9–9	May 2001	Mexico F4, Guadalajara	Futures	Clay	(Brazil) Bruno Soares	(Mexico) Marcello Amador (Mexico) Miguel Gallardo Valles	6–2, 6–2
Win	10–9	May 2001	Mexico F5, Cancún	Futures	Hard	(Brazil) Bruno Soares	(United States) Zack Fleishman (United States) Doug Root	6–4, 6–4
Win	11–9	Jun 2001	Brazil F4, Florianópolis	Futures	Clay	(Brazil) Márcio Carlsson	(Argentina) Guillermo Carry (Colombia) Michael Quintero Aguilar	6–3, 6–2
Loss	11–10	Jul 2001	Campos do Jordão, Brazil	Challenger	Hard	(Brazil) Ricardo Mello	(Mexico) Alejandro Hernández (Brazil) André Sá	7–6^{(8–6)}, 6–7^{(5–7)}, 5–7
Win	12–10	Oct 2001	Quito, Ecuador	Challenger	Clay	(Netherlands) Rogier Wassen	(United States) Hugo Armando (Argentina) Diego del Río	6–7^{(8–10)}, 6–4, 7–6^{(9–7)}
Loss	12–11	Nov 2001	Brazil F8, Campinas	Futures	Clay	(Brazil) Márcio Carlsson	(Argentina) Sebastián Decoud (Argentina) Sebastian Uriarte	4–6, 6–7^{(2–7)}
Loss	12–12	Nov 2001	Brazil F10, Aracaju	Futures	Hard	(Brazil) Eduardo Bohrer	(Brazil) Pedro Braga (Brazil) Ronaldo Carvalho	1–6, 7–5, 1–3 ret.
Win	13–12	May 2002	USA F11, Hallandale	Futures	Clay	(Argentina) Ignacio González King	(United States) Diego Ayala (North Macedonia) Lazar Magdinchev	4–6, 6–3, 7–5
Win	14–12	Jun 2002	Colombia F1, Santa Fe	Futures	Clay	(Brazil) Eduardo Bohrer	(Colombia) Pablo González (Colombia) Michael Quintero	6–1, 6–1
Win	15–12	Jul 2002	Oberstaufen, Germany	Challenger	Clay	(Chile) Jaime Fillol	(Argentina) Patricio Arquez (Argentina) Sergio Roitman	6–2, 6–4
Loss	15–13	Feb 2003	Brazil F1, São Paulo	Futures	Clay	(Brazil) Ronaldo Carvalho	(Brazil) Thiago Alves (Brazil) Bruno Soares	5–7, 4–6
Loss	15–14	Jul 2003	Oberstaufen, Germany	Challenger	Clay	(Argentina) Ignacio González King	(Hungary) Kornél Bardóczky (Brazil) Gergely Kisgyörgy	6–4, 6–7^{(4–7)}, 2–6
Win	16–14	Sep 2003	Bolivia F1, Santa Cruz	Futures	Clay	(Germany) Sebastian Jaeger	(Argentina) Matias Guccione (Argentina) Emiliano Redondi	6–3, 6–2
Loss	16–15	Oct 2003	Quito, Ecuador	Challenger	Clay	(United States) Hugo Armando	(Brazil) Ricardo Mello (Brazil) Alexandre Simoni	3–6, 4–6
