= Daria Kasatkina =

Australian tennis player (born 1997)

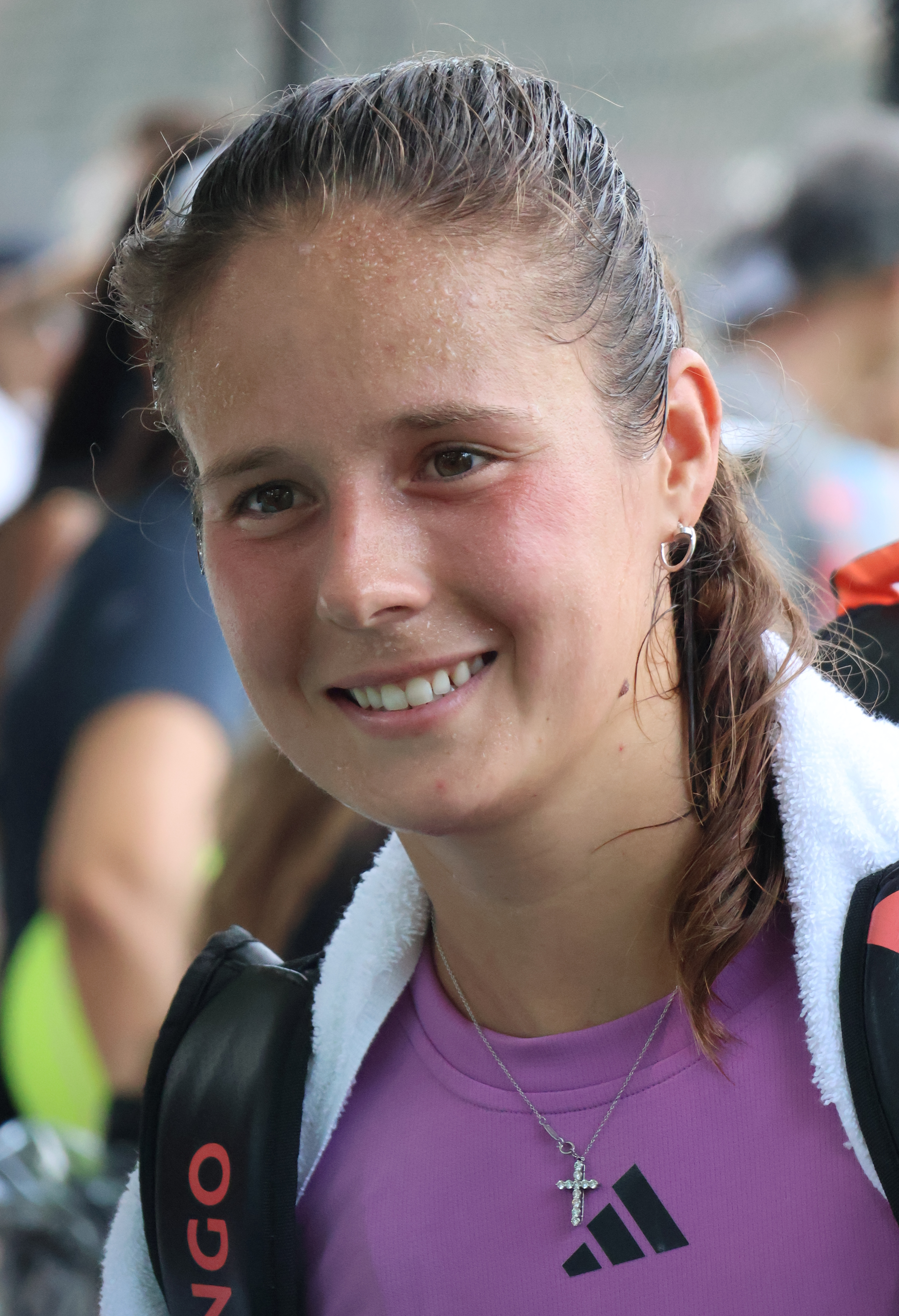
- Kasatkina at the 2024 Washington Open
- Full name: Daria Sergeyevna Kasatkina
- Native name: Дарья Сергеевна Касаткина
- Country (sports): Australia (2025–); Russia (2011–2025)
- Residence: Melbourne, Australia
- Born: 7 May 1997 (age 29) Tolyatti, Russia
- Height: 1.70 m (5 ft 7 in)
- Turned pro: 2014
- Plays: Right-handed (two-handed backhand)
- Prize money: $15,341,597

Singles
- Career record: 425–261
- Career titles: 8
- Highest ranking: No. 8 (24 October 2022)
- Current ranking: No. 75 (26 October 2026)

Grand Slam singles results
- Australian Open: 4R (2025)
- French Open: SF (2022)
- Wimbledon: QF (2018)
- US Open: 4R (2017, 2023)

Other tournaments
- Tour Finals: RR (2022, 2024)
- Olympic Games: QF (2016)

Doubles
- Career record: 56–68
- Career titles: 1
- Highest ranking: No. 43 (12 September 2016)
- Current ranking: No. 458 (26 October 2026)

Grand Slam doubles results
- Australian Open: 2R (2016, 2026)
- French Open: 3R (2019)
- Wimbledon: 3R (2016)
- US Open: 3R (2017)

Other doubles tournaments
- Olympic Games: QF (2016)

Team competitions
- Fed Cup: W (2020–21), record 7–3
Medal record
Representing Russia
Youth Olympic Games
Silver medal – second place	2014 Nanjing	Girls' doubles
- Last updated on: 26 October 2026.

Daria Sergeyevna Kasatkina (Note: also transliterated as Darya Kasatkina; Russian: Дарья Сергеевна Касаткина, IPA: [ˈdarʲjə kɐˈsatkʲɪnə]) (born 7 May 1997) is a Russian-born Australian professional tennis player. She has been ranked as high as world No. 8 in singles by the WTA, achieved in October 2022. Kasatkina has won eight WTA Tour singles titles and one title in doubles. Her best results at the majors are reaching the semifinals at the 2022 French Open and the quarterfinals of the 2018 Wimbledon Championships.

Born in Russia to parents who were nationally ranked in athletics and ice hockey, Kasatkina began playing tennis at age six at the insistence of her older brother. She excelled as a junior, winning the European 16s championship and a junior major singles title at the 2014 French Open. Kasatkina quickly ascended the professional rankings, reaching No. 32 in the world while still 18 years old, and winning her first WTA Tour title in 2017 as a teenager at the Charleston Open. She rose to further prominence in 2018 by narrowly losing to fellow up-and-coming player Naomi Osaka at the Indian Wells Open in a match regarded as representing a new wave of women's tennis. Kasatkina also has won the biggest titles of her career at the Kremlin Cup and at the St. Petersburg Trophy at home in Russia. Following three successful seasons on the WTA Tour, Kasatkina struggled in 2019, falling into the bottom half of the top 100. However, she had a resurgent 2021, claiming two titles to return to the top 30, followed by another two titles in 2022, marking her return to the top 10.

In team competition, Kasatkina led the Russian team to victory at the 2020–21 Billie Jean King Cup, winning all her matches in the tournament. Alongside Anastasia Pavlyuchenkova, Liudmila Samsonova, Veronika Kudermetova, and Ekaterina Alexandrova, she helped secure Russia's first Billie Jean King Cup title since 2008. Following her coming out as lesbian in 2022 (as a Russian, where LGBTQ rights are severely restricted) and her public condemning of the Russian invasion of Ukraine, Kasatkina switched nationalities to Australia in 2025. At that time, she was the Russian No. 2 in women's singles; subsequently, she became the Australian No. 1.

Kasatkina is known for her crafty style of play and diverse shotmaking. Compared to hard-hitting players who rely on their physicality and pure power, she relies on her speed and 'tennis IQ' to outmanoeuvre her opponents.

In addition to playing tennis, Kasatkina hosts a popular vlog series on YouTube titled What The Vlog with her wife and Olympic figure skater Natalia Zabiiako. The channel covers life on the WTA circuit and often features cameos from other players.

== Early life and background ==
Daria was born in Tolyatti, Samara Oblast to Tatyana Borisovna (née Timkovskaya) and Sergey Igorevich Kasatkin. Tolyatti is an industrial city located about 1000 km southeast of Moscow. Her father works as an engineer at the Volga Automotive Plant and her mother was a lawyer. Both of her parents were nationally ranked athletes in Russia (officially known as Candidates for Master of Sports); her mother in athletics, and her father in ice hockey. Kasatkina also has an older brother named Alexandr. Her brother had played tennis casually, and convinced her parents to have her also begin playing the sport when she was six years old. She initially played two to three times a week for two years. In time, she began competing in higher level tournaments. As the expenses to support her blossoming career began to rise, her parents made the difficult decision to sell their house to fund her training when she was about 12 years old. She is close childhood friends with fellow top players from the men's side Andrey Rublev and Alexander Bublik, as they are all the same age and grew up playing junior tournaments together in Russia.

== Junior years ==
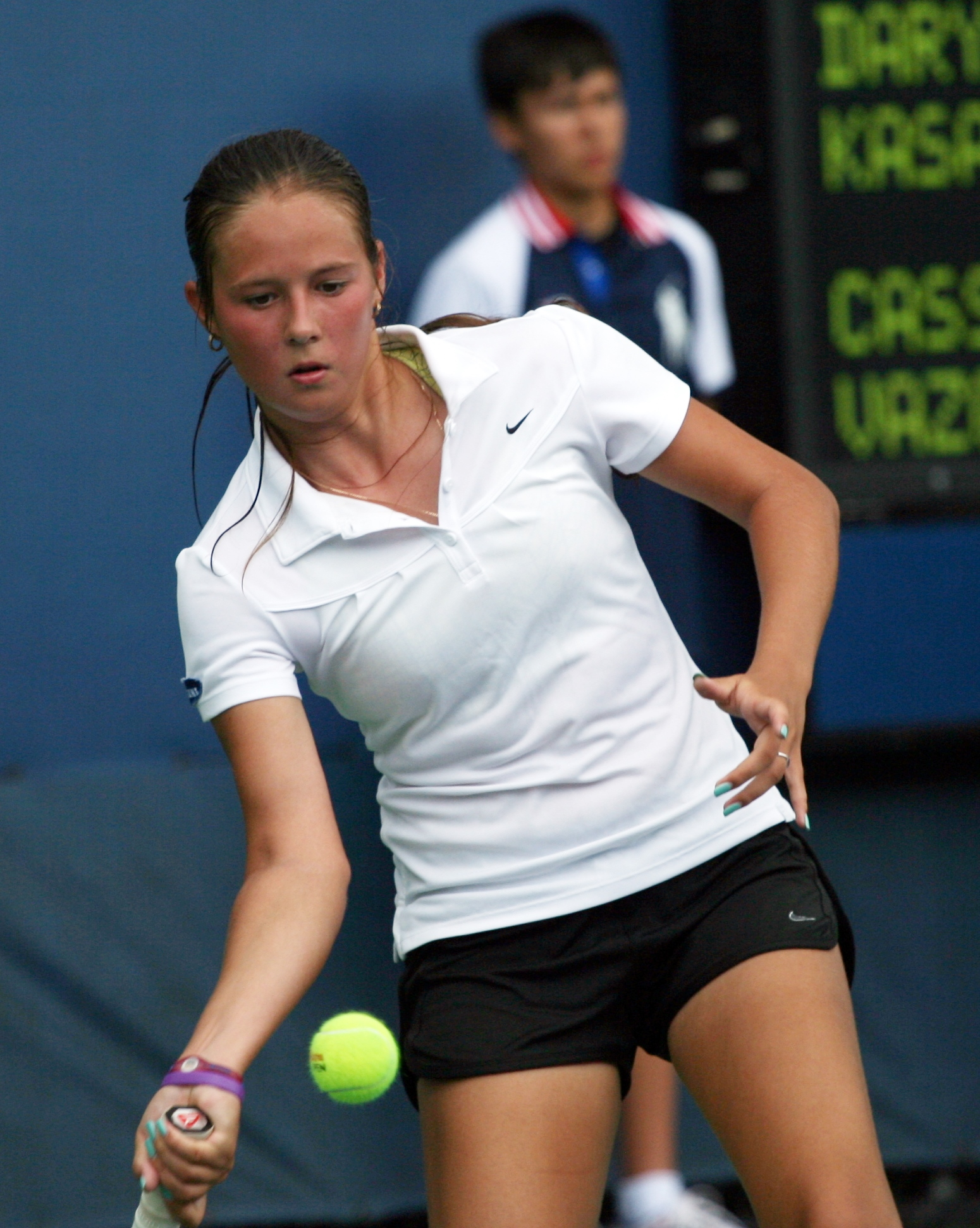
Kasatkina at the 2013 US Open

As a junior, Kasatkina was ranked as high as No. 3 in the world. She began competing on the ITF Junior Circuit shortly after turning 14 years old and won her first title at just her second career event, the low-level Grade 4 Samara Cup. In early 2012 while still 14, Kasatkina won two higher-level Grade 2 tournaments in Moldova and France, the former of which was the first Grade 2 event she entered. Towards the end of the year, she helped Russia reach the final of the Junior Fed Cup alongside Elizaveta Kulichkova and Alina Silich, where they finished runners-up to the United States.

Kasatkina began excelling at the highest level junior tournaments in 2013. She reached her first Grade-1 final in doubles in January, which she followed up with her first Grade-1 final in singles in April. After failing to win a match at her only two Grade A events the previous year, Kasatkina finished runner-up to Belinda Bencic at the Trofeo Bonfiglio in May. She then won her first junior Grand Slam matches the following month, reaching the quarterfinals at the French Open. Following this event, she did not play another tournament until late August, when she won her first Grade-1 title at the International Hard Court Championship in the United States. Kasatkina's last event of the year was the Junior Fed Cup, where she played the No. 1 singles matches. With Veronika Kudermetova and Aleksandra Pospelova, the top-seeded Russian team won the tournament, defeating Australia in the final.

Kasatkina had her best year on the junior tour in 2014, despite competing in just five tournaments. She reached both the singles and doubles finals at the Grade 1 Trofeo Mauro Sabatini, and won the title in singles. At the last ITF tournament of her career, Kasatkina won her first and only junior Grand Slam title in the girls' singles event at the French Open. As the No. 8 seed, she defeated top seed Ivana Jorović in the final, coming back from a set down. She was the first Russian girl to win the event since Nadia Petrova in 1998 and helped Russia sweep both junior singles events, with fellow European 16s champion Andrey Rublev winning the boys' singles title. In August, Kasatkina also participated in the Youth Olympic Games in Nanjing. She earned a silver medal in doubles alongside compatriot Anastasiya Komardina. They finished runners-up to Ukrainian Anhelina Kalinina and Belarusian Iryna Shymanovich.

== Professional ==
=== 2013–15: WTA Tour doubles title ===
Kasatkina began her professional career as a wildcard qualifying entrant at the 2013 Kremlin Cup, where she lost her only match. She made her professional main-draw debut on the ITF Circuit in November, and then won her first career title at a low-level 10k event in Sharm El Sheikh, Egypt a few months later. She also won a $25k title in Telavi, Georgia the following September. Kasatkina again received a wildcard into the 2014 Kremlin Cup, this time for the main draw. She lost her WTA Tour debut to Alison Riske.

Kasatkina began 2015 ranked No. 354, but steadily climbed to No. 161 at the end of June on the strength of four 25k titles. She then recorded her first WTA Tour match-win in July, against Aleksandra Krunić at the Gastein Ladies, en route to the quarterfinals. With her rankings improvement, Kasatkina was able to enter qualifying at a major event for the first time at the US Open. Although she lost in the last round, she reached the main draw as a lucky loser and made it to the third round, upsetting compatriot and world No. 38, Daria Gavrilova, as well as No. 79, Ana Konjuh. Before the end of the year, Kasatkina won her biggest titles to date in both singles and doubles. In September, she won the Open de Saint-Malo $50k singles event. In October, she won the doubles event at the Kremlin Cup with Elena Vesnina for her first WTA title. She also reached semifinals in singles as a qualifier, her best singles result on the WTA Tour at the time. In the event, she defeated world No. 14, Carla Suárez Navarro, in the quarterfinals for the biggest win of her career. She finished the year ranked No. 72.

=== 2016: First top ten victory, top 25 ===
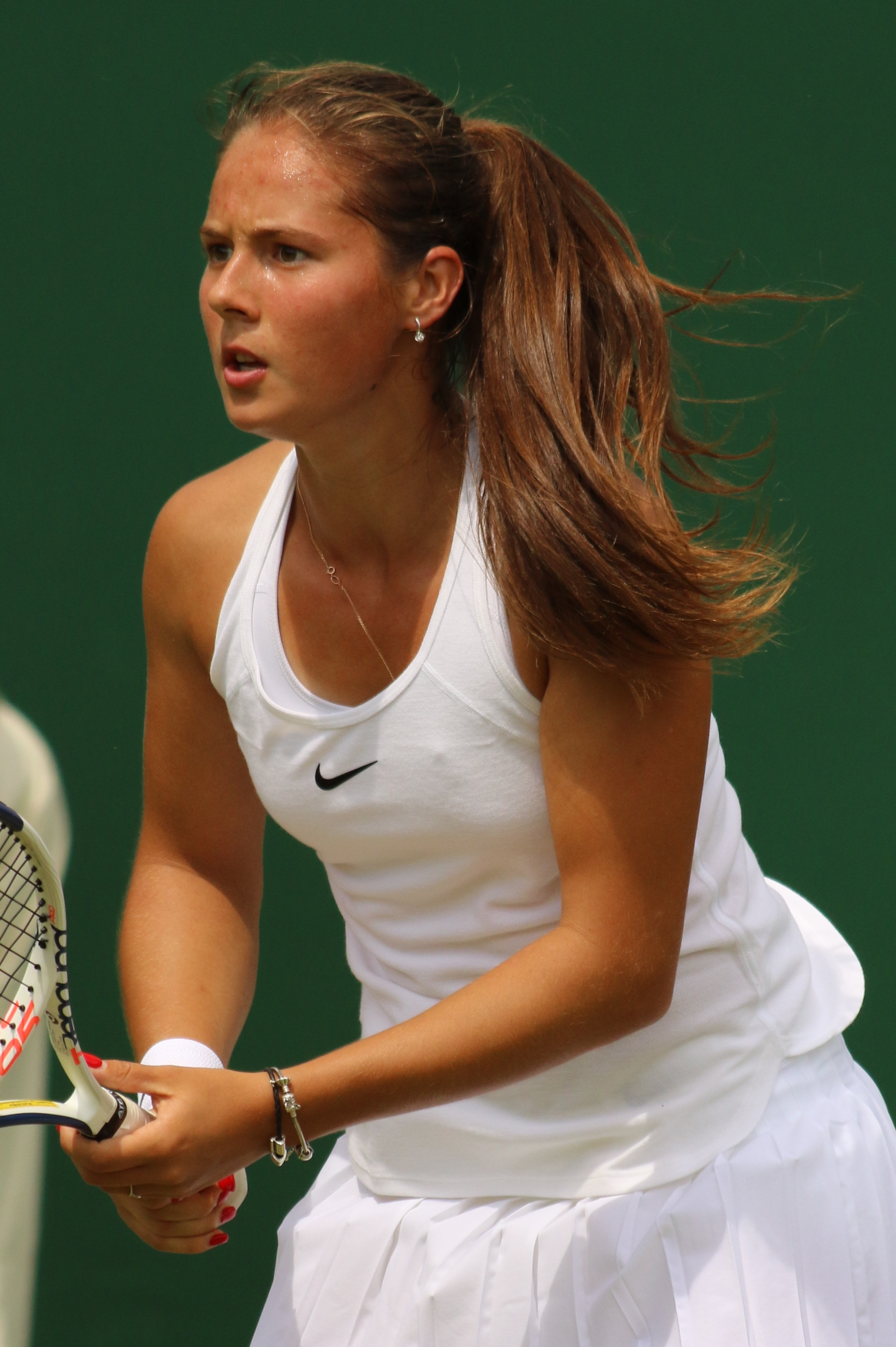
Kasatkina at the 2016 Wimbledon Championships

During the 2016 season, Kasatkina continued to rise in the WTA rankings, reaching No. 32 in the world while still 18 years old and as high as No. 24 later in the year. She began the year at the Auckland Open, where she recorded her first career top ten victory against world No. 7, Venus Williams. Kasatkina then made her Australian Open debut and reached the third round. She defeated No. 27, Anna Karolína Schmiedlová, in the first round before losing to world No. 1, Serena Williams. For her next tournament, she returned to Russia for the St. Petersburg Trophy and reached the semifinals, losing to Belinda Bencic. At the Indian Wells Open, Kasatkina then made it to the quarterfinals at her first Premier Mandatory event. She also produced one good result in doubles, a semifinals appearance at the Qatar Ladies Open with Elena Vesnina. The Russian duo notably defeated Martina Hingis and Sania Mirza to end their 41-match-win streak, the longest streak on the WTA Tour since 1990.

In the middle of the season, Kasatkina again reached the third round at two more major events, the French Open and Wimbledon. At both tournaments, she lost tight matches that each ended 10–8 in the third set, the former against Kiki Bertens and the latter against No. 8, Venus Williams. She had two chances to serve out the match against Bertens. Kasatkina continued her success at big tournaments at the Premier 5 Canadian Open, where she reached the quarterfinals. She defeated world No. 8, Roberta Vinci, in the third round for her second career top ten victory. Her next tournament was at the Rio Olympics. She qualified for the singles draw through her ranking, and also entered the doubles tournament with Svetlana Kuznetsova, after Margarita Gasparyan withdrew due to injury. Kasatkina reached the quarterfinals at both events, falling just short of the medal rounds. She lost to American Madison Keys in singles and the Czech team of Andrea Hlaváčková and Lucie Hradecká in doubles. At the US Open, her streak of four consecutive third-round appearances at majors was ended in the opening round by Wang Qiang.

Kasatkina's last big singles result of the season came at the Premier 5 Wuhan Open, where she made it to the third round. She had needed to qualify for the main draw after forgetting to sign up for the tournament. For the second consecutive year, Kasatkina reached the doubles final at the Kremlin Cup, this time with Daria Gavrilova. The pair finished runners-up to Hlaváčková and Hradecká. Kasatkina ended the season at world No. 27.

=== 2017: First career singles title ===
Kasatkina maintained a steady ranking throughout 2017, falling no lower than No. 42 in the world and again reaching the same season-best of No. 24 as 2016. Nonetheless, she had a slow start to the season, not winning a single match at the Australian Open or the two Premier Mandatory events in the United States, the three biggest tournaments through March. Her best results were two quarterfinals at mid-level two Premier tournaments, the Sydney International and the Qatar Ladies Open. In Sydney, she also defeated Angelique Kerber for her first career victory over a current world No. 1 player.

After struggling on hardcourts, Kasatkina had better clay-court results on the strength of her first and last tournaments on the surface. At the Charleston Open, she won her first WTA Tour singles title, shortly before turning 20 years old. She defeated fellow teenager Jeļena Ostapenko in the final, in straight sets. Kasatkina closed out the clay-court season with another third-round appearance at the French Open, where she lost to eventual finalist and world No. 4, Simona Halep. Her only grass-court event was Wimbledon, where she made it to the second round.

Towards the end of the year, Kasatkina had more success on hardcourts. At the US Open, she made it to the fourth round of a major event for the first time. After defeating Ostapenko who had won the French Open, she was upset by veteran qualifier Kaia Kanepi. Nonetheless, she built on this result in Asia, first by reaching another WTA doubles final with Gavrilova at the Pan Pacific Open. In singles at the Wuhan Open, she upset world No. 2, Halep. She also made her second career Premier Mandatory quarterfinal at the China Open, this time losing to Halep. Kasatkina closed out the year with her second best singles result of the season, a runner-up finish at her hometown Premier tournament, the Kremlin Cup. She upset fifth seed and world No. 18, Anastasia Pavlyuchenkova, in the first round, but was defeated by seventh seed Julia Görges in the final.

=== 2018: Kremlin Cup title, Russian No. 1, top 10 ===
Kasatkina continued her late season success from the previous year into 2018. After only winning one match between three tournaments in Australia, she reached the semifinals at the St. Petersburg Trophy and then the final at the Dubai Championships, two Premier tournaments. In St. Petersburg, she notably defeated then-world No. 1, Caroline Wozniacki. In Dubai, she saved three match points en route to defeating another top-5 player in world No. 3, Garbiñe Muguruza, before losing to the defending champion and world No. 4, Elina Svitolina. Kasatkina's breakthrough came at Indian Wells, where she reached her second final of the season. She defeated four top-15 players at that event including Wozniacki again and also No. 8, Venus Williams, in a tight three-set match. She finished runner-up to fellow 20-year-old Naomi Osaka in a match regarded as representative of a new wave in women's tennis. With this result, she climbed to No. 11 in the WTA rankings and also became the Russian No. 1, ending Kuznetsova's long run as Russia's top women's singles player.

Kasatkina had strong clay- and grass-court seasons as well. She made the quarterfinals at the Charleston Open and the third round at the Premier 5 Italian Open. She also had another big result at a Premier Mandatory tournament, reaching the quarterfinals at the Madrid Open. During the event, she upset hometown favourite and world No. 3, Garbiñe Muguruza. Her best tournament on clay was the French Open, where she reached her first major quarterfinal. She defeated No. 2, Wozniacki, for the third time in 2018 in a match that was suspended midway through due to darkness, before losing to the eventual runner-up Sloane Stephens. Another major quarterfinal followed at Wimbledon, losing to the eventual champion and world No. 11, Angelique Kerber.

"It was a dream of mine since childhood, to win the Kremlin Cup in front of my crowd. I'm so happy, I still can't believe it... There were fans from Russia, from Tunisia, from everywhere – the atmosphere felt more like Fed Cup, but it was great. But it was amazing because this is what sport is about, the passion."

— Kasatkina on her Kremlin Cup title.

Kasatkina failed to continue her Grand Slam tournament success at the US Open losing in the second round. In October, she returned to Russia and won the Kremlin Cup for her only title of the season. She defeated Tunisian qualifier Ons Jabeur in the final. With the title, she also made her top 10 debut. Kasatkina was initially named the second alternate for the WTA Finals. With only one withdrawal, she instead participated in the WTA Elite Trophy, where she was grouped with Madison Keys and Wang Qiang. She began the round robin with a win over Wang, but lost to Keys in a match where she had to play on a short amount of rest while Keys was playing her first match. As a result, she finished in last place in the group through the tiebreak criteria. Kasatkina finished the year ranked No. 10 in the world.

=== 2019: Rankings drop to No. 70 ===
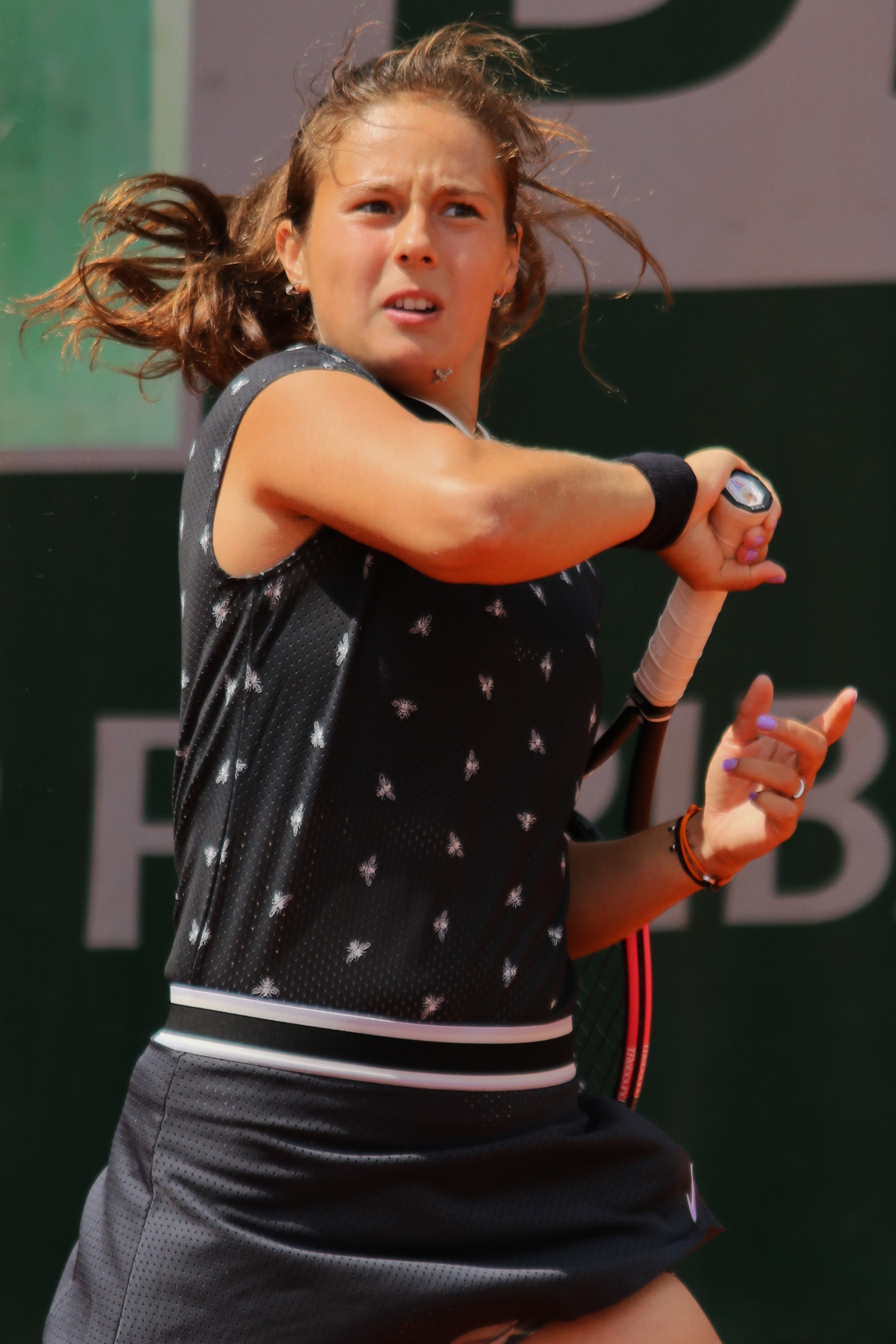
Kasatkina at the 2019 French Open

Kasatkina could not repeat the success from any of her full seasons on the WTA Tour during 2019. After beginning the year in the top ten, her ranking dropped throughout the season down to as low as No. 70 near the end of the year. Whereas she won at least 60% of her matches in each of her three previous years, she finished 2019 with a losing record of 12–21. She parted with her longtime coach Philippe Dehaes in February, replacing him with Carlos Martinez in April.

Kasatkina's results did not improve with Martinez as her coach. She did not make the semifinals at any event. Kasatkina won multiple matches at two tournaments during the year, the Premier 5 Italian Open in May and the Premier Mandatory China Open in October where she won three matches and made the quarterfinals. At the China Open, she defeated No. 14, Aryna Sabalenka and No. 38, Ekaterina Alexandrova, before losing to No. 19, Caroline Wozniacki. Kasatkina's losses were generally against good competition, with only seven of her 21 losses coming against players ranked outside of the top 50. The highest-ranked opponent she defeated during the year was No. 13, Angelique Kerber, in the first round of the Canadian Open. Kasatkina remained in the top 50 until the very end of the season, when she lost the points she was defending from the previous year's WTA Elite Trophy.

=== 2020: Mixed results ===
In 2020, Kasatkina first participated in Auckland, where she defeated Carla Suárez Navarro before falling to Amanda Anisimova in the second round. At Adelaide, she progressed through qualifying, before being defeated by Belinda Bencic in the first main-draw round. At the Australian Open, she lost to Madison Keys in the first round. At St. Petersburg, she lost in the first round to Ekaterina Alexandrova, and, at Dubai, was forced to enter qualifying. She defeated Natalia Vikhlyantseva in the first round, but lost to Kristina Mladenovic in the second qualifying round. At Doha, she entered the main draw through qualification, defeating Vikhlyantseva and Aliaksandra Sasnovich, but she lost in the first round of the main draw to Garbiñe Muguruza. She reached her first semifinal since 2018 at Lyon where, as the seventh seed, she defeated Pauline Parmentier, Irina Bara, and Camila Giorgi, before being defeated in three sets by Anna-Lena Friedsam. By virtue of her result in this tournament, Kasatkina's ranking rose to No. 66, before the suspension of the WTA Tour due to the COVID-19 pandemic.

Kasatkina's first tournament after the suspension was at Palermo, where she lost in the first round to Jasmine Paolini, in a match that lasted 3 hours and 9 minutes; this match was the fourth longest on the WTA Tour in the entirety of 2020. She then qualified for the Cincinnati Open, defeating Kateryna Bondarenko and Christina McHale, before losing in the first round to Anett Kontaveit. At the US Open, she lost in the first round to Marta Kostyuk, winning just three games. She next qualified for the Italian Open, defeating Arina Rodionova and Gabriela Dabrowski, and reached the third round after defeating Vera Zvonareva and Kateřina Siniaková. She withdrew from the competition, however, as she injured herself during a first-set tiebreak against Victoria Azarenka. She recuperated in time for the French Open, where she defeated Harmony Tan in the first round, before falling to Aryna Sabalenka. Her final event of the year was at the inaugural tournament in Ostrava, where she defeated Bethanie Mattek-Sands and Marie Bouzková to qualify. She defeated Elena Rybakina in the first round, before losing to Jennifer Brady, despite leading by 5–2 in the first set, eventually losing that set 7–5. She ended the year ranked No. 72, her lowest year-end ranking since 2015.

=== 2021: Two singles titles ===
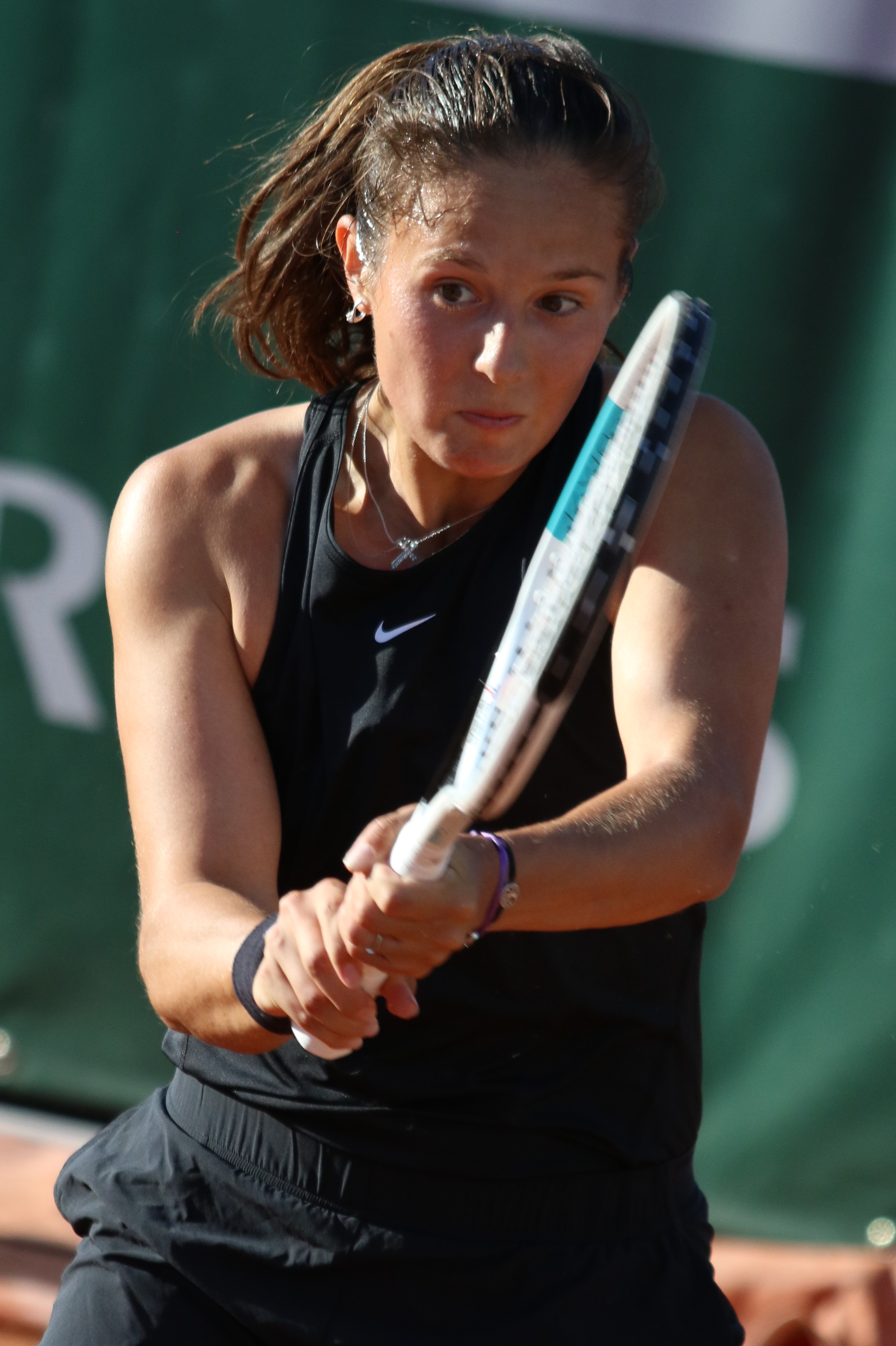
Kasatkina at the 2021 French Open

Kasatkina kicked off her 2021 season at the Abu Dhabi Open, where she defeated Wang Qiang in the first round in three sets. She was due to face 12th seed Karolína Muchová but the Czech withdrew, sending Kasatkina into the third round. There she lost to sixth seed Elena Rybakina, in straight sets.

She then played in the Gippsland Trophy and made the third round with straight sets wins over Mihaela Buzărnescu, with the loss of just two games, and Polona Hercog. However, she lost to Estonian veteran and eventual finalist, Kaia Kanepi, in straight sets. At the Australian Open, she defeated Briton Katie Boulter, in straight sets, before losing in two tight sets to Aryna Sabalenka despite winning more points in the first set. Kasatkina bounced back from that loss emphatically at the Phillip Island Trophy, held during the second week of the Australian Open. She defeated Katie Boulter for the second time in five days and Varvara Gracheva, in straight sets, to record back to back wins for the third time in four events that season. The Russian then came from a set down to edge Anastasia Pavlyuchenkova, before dominating Petra Martić to make her first WTA semifinal since Lyon in 2020. She then defeated Danielle Collins and Marie Bouzková in three sets to claim her third title and first since Moscow 2018.

However, she crashed out in her opening-round match in Dubai to Alizé Cornet. She bounced back at the St. Petersburg Ladies' Trophy, halting the winning streak of rising star Clara Tauson in the first round. Kasatkina then fought hard for a three-set win over Aliaksandra Sasnovich, who served for the match. Back-to-back comeback wins came over compatriots Veronika Kudermetova and Svetlana Kuznetsova. She then defeated wildcard Margarita Gasparyan in the final after Gasparyan was forced to retire early in the second set. This was Kasatkina's second title at home and this also made her the first two-time champion of the 2021 season, moving herself back into the top 50 for the first time since October 2019.

Despite clay being her favoured surface, Kasatkina failed to reach a quarterfinal throughout the clay-court season. She was upset by Marta Kostyuk in the second round of the İstanbul Cup, before falling to Sabalenka in the second round of the Madrid Open. At the French Open, Kasatkina defeated tenth seed Belinda Bencic, in straight sets, to make the third round for the first time since 2018. She was defeated by Sorana Cîrstea in straight sets.

Seeded fourth, Kasatkina reached the final at the Birmingham Classic. This was her eighth career final, first on grass and third of 2021. Her run started with a comeback from 4–6, 0–3 against Polona Hercog in the first round, before avenging her loss against Kostyuk, ousting Tereza Martincová and CoCo Vandeweghe to reach the final. However, she lost to Ons Jabeur in straight sets. She lost in the quarterfinals of the Eastbourne International to Jeļena Ostapenko after securing her first top ten win in two years over Iga Świątek, losing just one game after dropping the opening set. Kasatkina's grass-court season ended with a second-round appearance at the Wimbledon Championships, losing to Ostapenko 6–8 in the final set.

Kasatkina reached her fourth final of the year at the Silicon Valley Classic, beating former top ten player Caroline Garcia, in three sets, before coming back to avoid the upset against Magda Linette in the quarterfinals. She then dominated top seed Elise Mertens without getting broken, but lost to home favourite Danielle Collins in the final. After early defeats at the Canadian Open and Cincinnati Open to Jabeur and world No. 10, Barbora Krejčíková, respectively, Kasatkina reached the third round of the US Open with wins over defending quarterfinalist Tsvetana Pironkova and Olympics silver medalist, Markéta Vondroušová, but lost to fifth seed Elina Svitolina, in straight sets.

Her season ended with a third-round defeat at the Indian Wells Open to Angelique Kerber, in three sets and a surprising first-round exit to Anhelina Kalinina in the first round of the Kremlin Cup.

=== 2022: First major semifinal, Russian No. 1, world No. 8 ===
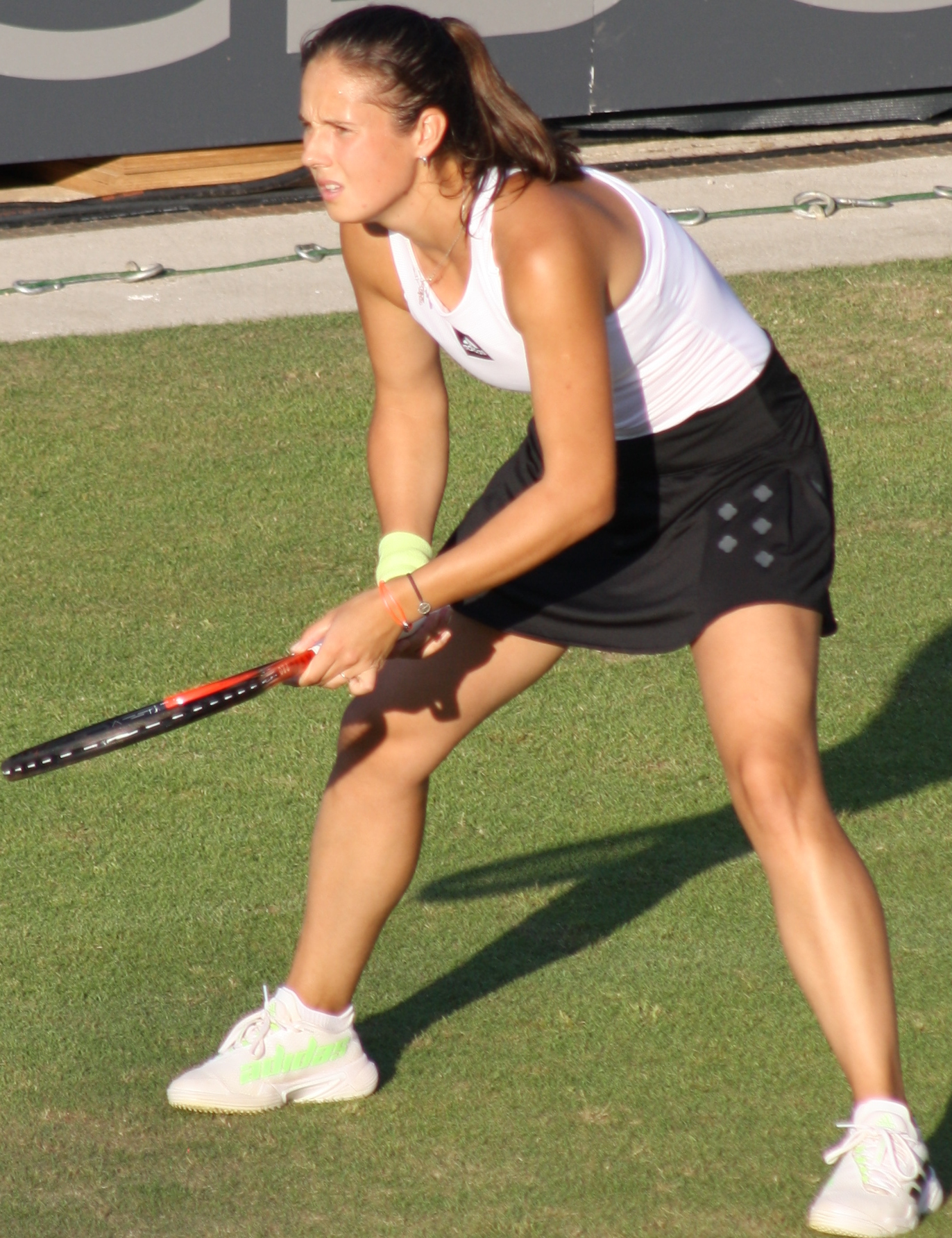
Kasatkina at the 2022 Bad Homburg Open

Kasatkina began the year ranked No. 26. She first played the Melbourne Summer Set 2, a WTA 250 event, as the third seed; here, she reached the semifinals by defeating Anna Kalinskaya, Madison Keys, and Nuria Párrizas Díaz before losing to eventual champion Amanda Anisimova. The next week, she reached a second consecutive semifinal, this time at the Sydney International, a WTA 500 event. She defeated eighth seed Sofia Kenin, Elise Mertens, and second seed Garbiñe Muguruza, before losing to fifth seed and eventual champion, Paula Badosa. Kasatkina next reached the third round of the 2022 Australian Open as the 25th seed, defeating qualifier Stefanie Vögele and Magda Linette, before falling to seventh seed Iga Świątek.

In the next hardcourt events, Kasatkina was defeated by Iga Świątek in both Dubai and Doha in the first and third rounds, respectively. She lost to Angelique Kerber in Indian Wells third round and to Aliaksandra Sasnovich in Miami second round in receipt of first-round byes.

At the Italian Open, she reached her first WTA 1000 semifinal of the season and second of her career, where she was defeated by Ons Jabeur, after having a match point. As a result, she returned to the top 20 in the rankings, once again becoming the No. 1 Russian player on 16 May 2022.

Kasatkina entered the French Open as the 20th seed. She defeated lucky loser Rebecca Šramková, qualifier Fernanda Contreras, Shelby Rogers, and 28th seed Camila Giorgi to reach the quarterfinals, matching her best result at the tournament from 2018. She then went one step further, defeating compatriot and 29th seed Veronika Kudermetova to reach her maiden Grand Slam semifinal. She then lost in straight sets to world No. 1, Iga Świątek, for the fourth time this year.

Kasatkina played two tournaments on grass, Berlin and Bad Homburg; she was defeated in the quarterfinals by Maria Sakkari and Bianca Andreescu, respectively. She did not compete in Wimbledon due to the All England Club's decision to ban Russian and Belarusian players, in response to the Russian invasion of Ukraine.

At the Silicon Valley Classic, she reached the semifinals, again defeating Wimbledon champion Elena Rybakina, qualifier Taylor Townsend and world No. 6 and fourth seed, Aryna Sabalenka, in three sets. She bageled each opponent in the last set in the match. She reached back-to-back finals, after defeating world No. 4 and second seed, Paula Badosa. She defeated Shelby Rogers in the final, securing a WTA 500 title and returning to the top 10 in the rankings at a new career-high of world No. 9 on 8 August 2022. She became tied for third in wins in the season with 32, behind only No. 1 Iga Świątek, and Wimbledon finalist Ons Jabeur.

After getting eliminated by Bianca Andreescu and Amanda Anisimova in the opening rounds of Toronto and Cincinnati, respectively, Kasatkina won her sixth career title in Granby. She defeated Greet Minnen, Magdalena Fręch, Nuria Párrizas Díaz, Diane Parry and Daria Saville losing just one set en route to win the title. However, she fell to Harriet Dart in the first round of the US Open.

Seeded fifth at the Ostrava Open, Kasatkina defeated Emma Raducanu in the first round, before falling to Ekaterina Alexandrova in straight sets. Seeded No. 8 at the San Diego Open, she breezed past Leylah Fernandez, before losing to Madison Keys in the second round. In receipt of a first-round bye in Guadalajara, she was defeated in the third round by Anna Kalinskaya, in three sets. With this result, she qualified for her first WTA Finals.

At the WTA Finals, Kasatkina lost to Świątek again before she earned her first victory of the Finals against Coco Gauff, in straight sets, but she could not advance beyond round-robin stage as she was defeated by Caroline Garcia in a close three-set match. She finished the year with a new career-high ranking of world No. 8.

=== 2023: Two WTA 500 finals ===
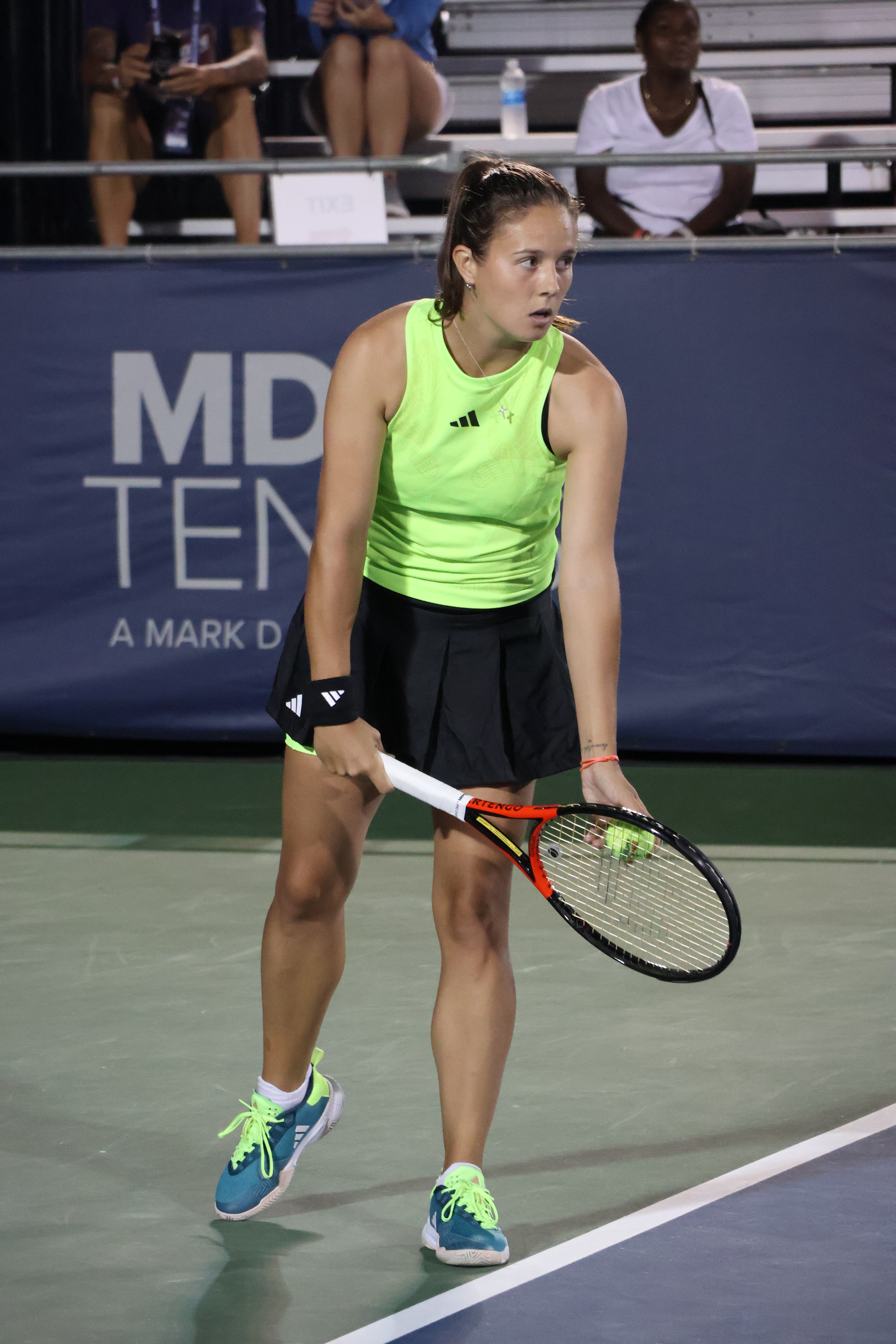
Kasatkina playing in the first round of the 2023 Washington Open

Kasatkina started the season at the Adelaide International 1. Seeded third, she lost in the first round to qualifier Linda Nosková, in three sets. In the second event of Adelaide, after a first-round bye, she defeated Barbora Krejčíková and Petra Kvitová, in straight sets, before receiving a walkover from Paula Badosa to the final. In the final, she was defeated by Belinda Bencic, in straight sets. Seeded eighth at the Australian Open, Kasatkina lost in the first round to Varvara Gracheva, in straight sets.

At the French Open, she reached the fourth round in which she lost to Elina Svitolina.

At the Eastbourne International, she advanced to the final defeating second seed Caroline Garcia by walkover and Camila Giorgi. Kasatkina lost the final to Madison Keys.

At the US Open, Kasatkina matched her best ever US Open result, advancing to the fourth round of the tournament by defeating Alycia Parks, Sofia Kenin and Greet Minnen. In the round of 16 and her first time playing in the main Arthur Ashe Stadium, she was defeated by the world No. 1, Aryna Sabalenka.

=== 2024: Seventh and eighth career titles ===
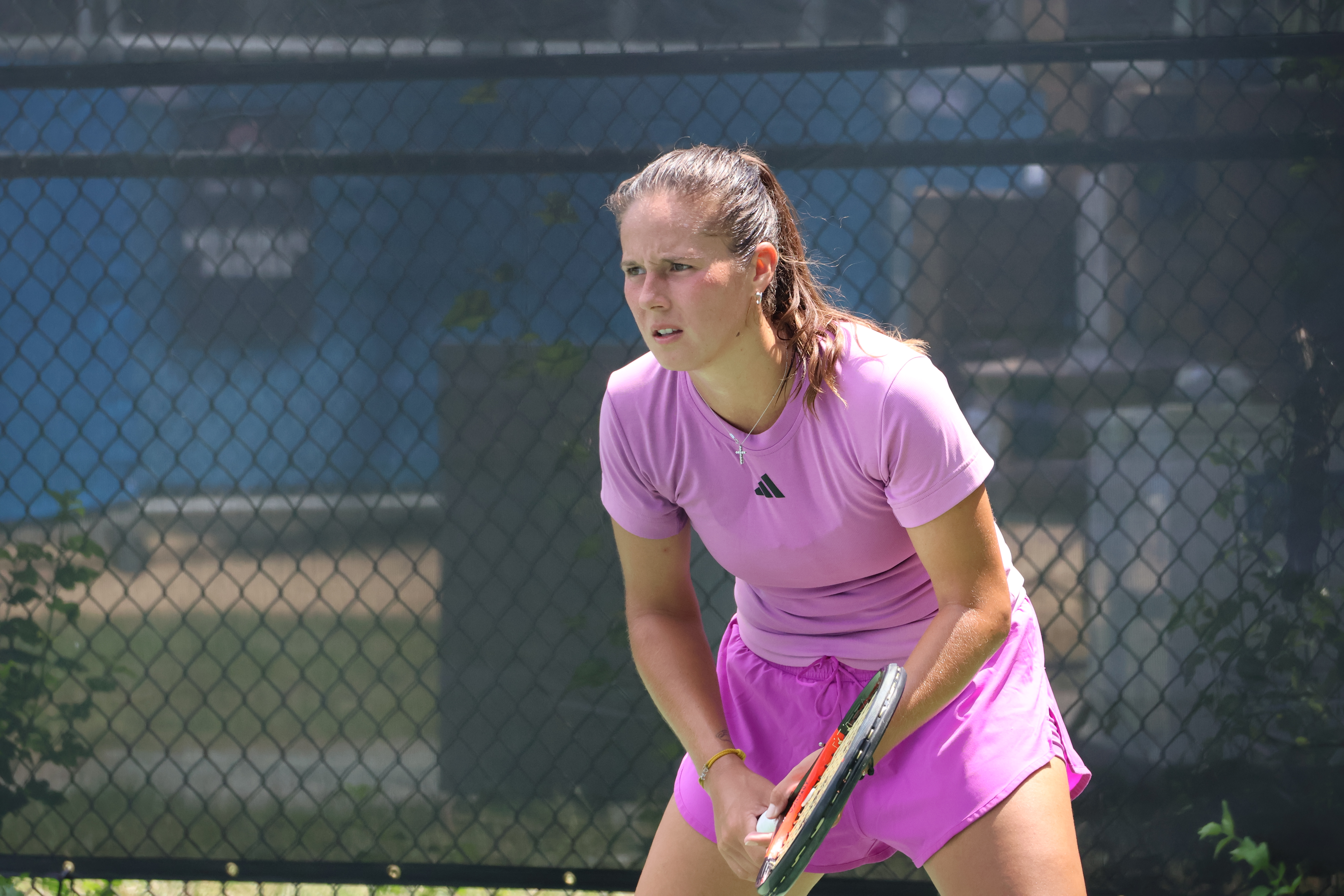
Kasatkina practicing at the 2024 DC Open

In Adelaide, she reached a second consecutive final after a second consecutive walkover from second seed Jessica Pegula, after Laura Siegemund withdrew in the quarterfinals. In the final, Kasatkina lost to Jeļena Ostapenko. Seeded 14th at the Australian Open, Kasatkina fell in the second round to Sloane Stephens. Afterwards, she reached the final of the Abu Dhabi Open by winning a long semifinal match against Beatriz Haddad Maia, losing the decisive match in straight sets to Elena Rybakina.

In June, Kasatkina reached the final of Eastbourne, after defeating Emma Raducanu in straight sets in the quarterfinals, and third seed Jasmine Paolini in the semifinals. She won her seventh title defeating Leylah Fernandez. The next week, she went out of the Wimbledon Championships in the third round losing to Paula Badosa.

Kasatkina was invited by the International Olympic Committee to participate in the 2024 Summer Olympics as an Individual Neutral Athlete – Russian and Belarusian athletes who have been vetted and are deemed to meet the principles of Olympism that their nations do not – but declined the invitation, along with 12 other potential neutral tennis players.

In September, she reached the final at the upgraded WTA 500 Korea Open, where she lost to Haddad Maia in three sets. After making back to back third round appearances in Beijing and Wuhan, Kasatkina claimed her 8th career title and second of the year in Ningbo defeating compatriot Mirra Andreeva in three sets.

After Jessica Pegula withdrew from the tournament due to a knee injury, Kasatkina was called into the WTA Finals as first alternate for the final round of group matches. She lost to Iga Świątek in straight sets.

=== 2025: From Russian No. 2 to Australian No. 1 ===
Seeded third, Kasatkina reached the quarterfinals at the Adelaide International, at which point she lost to eventual champion Madison Keys. At the Australian Open, she advanced to the fourth round in a career-best finish at the tournament, and was defeated by eighth seed Emma Navarro.

In March, Kasatkina announced that she would start to represent Australia and live in Melbourne. At the time of the nationality change, she was the second ranked Russian player; subsequently, she became the new Australian number one. At the Charleston Open, she lost in the third round to Sofia Kenin.

Kasatkina made it through to the fourth round at the French Open, and the third round at both Wimbledon and the US Open. After a run of indifferent results, she brought an early end to her season in early October, stating she was "mentally and emotionally" at "breaking point."

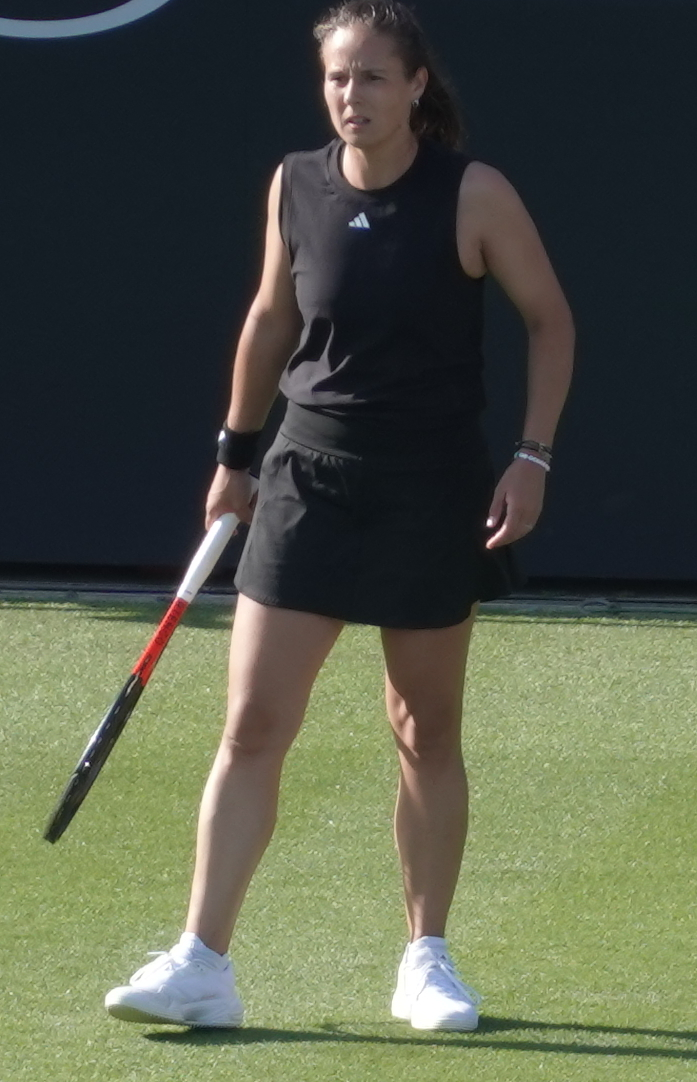
Kasatkina at the 2025 Eastbourne Open

=== 2026: Injury and rankings slump ===
Despite winning her first round match in Dubai, Kasatkina withdrew due to a right hip injury and only returned after two months in Rouen. Following a defeat in the first round at the Madrid Open in April, Kasatkina fell to her lowest WTA ranking for 11 years at world No. 83.

Dropping down to WTA 125 level, she won the title at the Catalonia Open in May, defeating Tamara Korpatsch in the final. Two weeks later Kasatkina qualified for the main-draw at the Strasbourg Open and defeated sixth seed Liudmila Samsonova and Peyton Stearns to reach the quarterfinals, at which point she lost to Jaqueline Cristian in three sets. At the French Open, she made it through to the third round where she lost to world No. 1 Aryna Sabalenka. Kasatkina also reached the third round at Wimbledon, losing to 14th seed Naomi Osaka. At the US Open, she lost to Paula Badosa in the first round.

== National representation ==
Having won the Junior Fed Cup in 2013, Kasatkina made her senior Fed Cup debut for Russia in 2016 in a World Group quarterfinal against the Netherlands. She won the dead rubber doubles match with Ekaterina Makarova against Cindy Burger and Arantxa Rus as Russia lost the tie. She also participated in the World Group play-offs against Belarus two months later and played three rubbers, as Makarova and Svetlana Kuznetsova both opted to skip the tie. Kasatkina won her first live rubber against Aliaksandra Sasnovich, but Russia lost all three other singles rubbers to lose the tie. Partnering with Elena Vesnina, she also won the doubles dead rubber. Nonetheless, Russia were relegated out of the World Group.

In 2017, Russia played in World Group II and won their tie to advance to World Group play-offs. After Kasatkina skipped that tie, she returned for the play-off round. However, for the second consecutive year, Russia lost in this round to Belgium to keep them in World Group II. Kasatkina won her only singles match to set up a decisive doubles rubber. Alongside Vesnina, Kasatkina lost that match to Elise Mertens and An-Sophie Mestach. Kasatkina did not participate in Fed Cup in 2018 as Russia were further relegated to the Europe/Africa zonal group.

Kasatkina competed for Russia in 2019 during the zonal competitions, recording a win over Karen Barritza in straight sets in the only match she played throughout the week. Russia ultimately secured a place in the World Group II play-offs.

She made her return to the team for the 2020–21 Billie Jean King Cup Finals, where she was nominated for the team as the second-ranked Russian. In the matches she was nominated for, Kasatkina beat Carol Zhao in straight sets for an overall 3–0 win in the group stage. She then beat Jil Teichmann in the final, helping Russia to secure their first title since 2008.

In March 2025, Kasatkina announced that she would represent Australia at all tennis events in the future after being granted permanent residency. In January 2026, she acquired Australian citizenship.

== Playing style ==
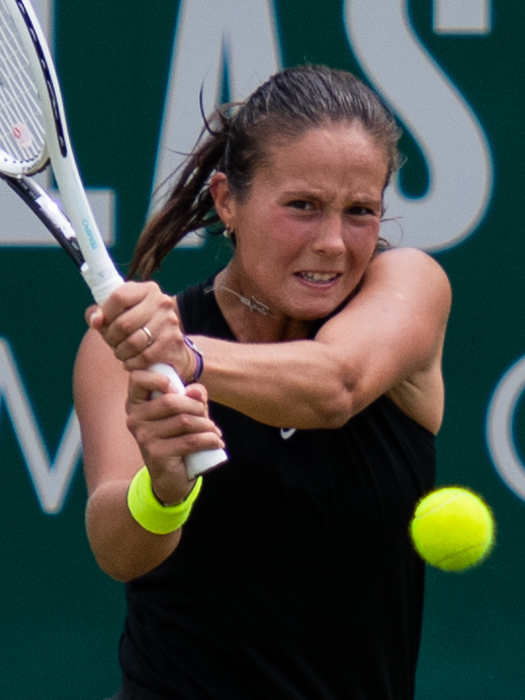
The jumping backhand, one of her signature shots

Kasatkina is a baseline player with a crafty style of play. She employs a variety of shots including heavy topspin forehands, one-handed slice backhands, kick serves, drop shots, and tweeners. (Note: Kasatkina holds the Guinness World Record for "most successful tennis tweener shots hit in one minute" (18, set in 2019).) Tennis journalist Steve Tignor compared her ability to naturally hit one-handed backhands despite typically utilizing a two-handed shot similar to that of former world No. 1 men's tennis player Andy Murray. Her former coach Phillip Dehaes described her style as "change of rhythm, change of speed, change of trajectory." She relies on outsmarting her opponents through tactics rather than hitting overpowering shots. However, she is capable of hitting powerful groundstrokes as well. Dehaes said that her key is to avoid hitting the ball into her opponent's strike zone. Kasatkina's style has been praised by others including women's tennis coach Wim Fissette, who called her "the Roger Federer of women's tennis".

Kasatkina's favourite surface is clay. Fellow top women's player Caroline Wozniacki has commended her clay court ability, saying, "The slower the surface is, the better for her. She has very good hands and good angles and everything." As such, she also excels at tournaments with slower hard courts, such as the Indian Wells Open. Kasatkina has had a good record on all three main surfaces on the WTA Tour, winning a clay court title at the Charleston Open, winning a hard court title at the Kremlin Cup, and reaching the quarterfinals on grass at Wimbledon.

== Coaches ==
When Kasatkina was eleven years old, Maxim Prasolov began coaching her. At the age of 14, she switched coaches to Damir Rishatovich Nurgaliev. Beginning in 2015, she moved to Trnava in Slovakia to train at the Empire Tennis Academy, citing her preference to train away from a large city, something that was less feasible in Russia. At the academy, she worked with former Slovak professional tennis player Vladimír Pláteník.

After three years, she hired Belgian Philippe Dehaes to be her new coach in late 2017. Kasatkina had previously sought out Dehaes as a coach in late 2013 when she visited Belgium in search of funding from a foundation that was providing financial support for one of Dehaes's junior players. Dehaes has stated he has a different coaching style than Pláteník, saying, "She was working before with a coach who was really focused on the opponent and on adapting the game to the opponent. I don't watch the opponent." He added that, "I insist on leaving her a lot of freedom when she plays, but she has to create, has to make things happen, really like an artist. I compared it to an empty canvas a few days ago, and I said she can make whatever art on that canvas that she wants as long as it's beautiful." Kasatkina split with Dehaes in February 2019. She had only wanted to take a break from having a coach, but Dehaes could not accommodate being without a job. After two months without a coach, she replaced him with Carlos Martinez, former coach of fellow Russian Svetlana Kuznetsova. Kasatkina's brother Alexandr is her fitness trainer. Kasatkina and Martinez's relationship ended in February 2023, and former player Flavio Cipolla began coaching her.

== Personal life ==
Kasatkina's tennis idol is Rafael Nadal. In the women's game, she is a fan of Petra Kvitová and Maria Sharapova. She prefers to watch men's tennis over women's, saying that the players are better at serving and moving around the court. Kasatkina likes to play sports in general, including football. She is a fan of FC Barcelona.

Kasatkina has been sponsored by Nike, Tecnifibre and Instaforex throughout her career. Her sponsorship with Nike ended in 2021, due to a series of poor results. In August 2021, Kasatkina signed an endorsement deal with Adidas for clothing, footwear, and apparel. She switched to Decathlon's Artengo racquets in 2022 after trying different racquets in a blind test.

In an interview with Sofya Tartakova in 2021, Kasatkina made comments that were presumed to be discussing her bisexuality. In 2022, she clarified these comments, coming out as lesbian, and stating in an interview that she is in a relationship with Olympic Estonian-Russian figure skater, Natalia Zabiiako. It became public after Kasatkina and Zabiiako posted photos of each other together on Instagram.

Zabiiako and Kasatkina announced their engagement in June 2025 and married in July 2026. The couple also have a YouTube blog channel where regularly upload videos depicting a look into the behind-the-scenes of their life on the professional WTA circuit, often featuring interviews and cameos from fellow top players.

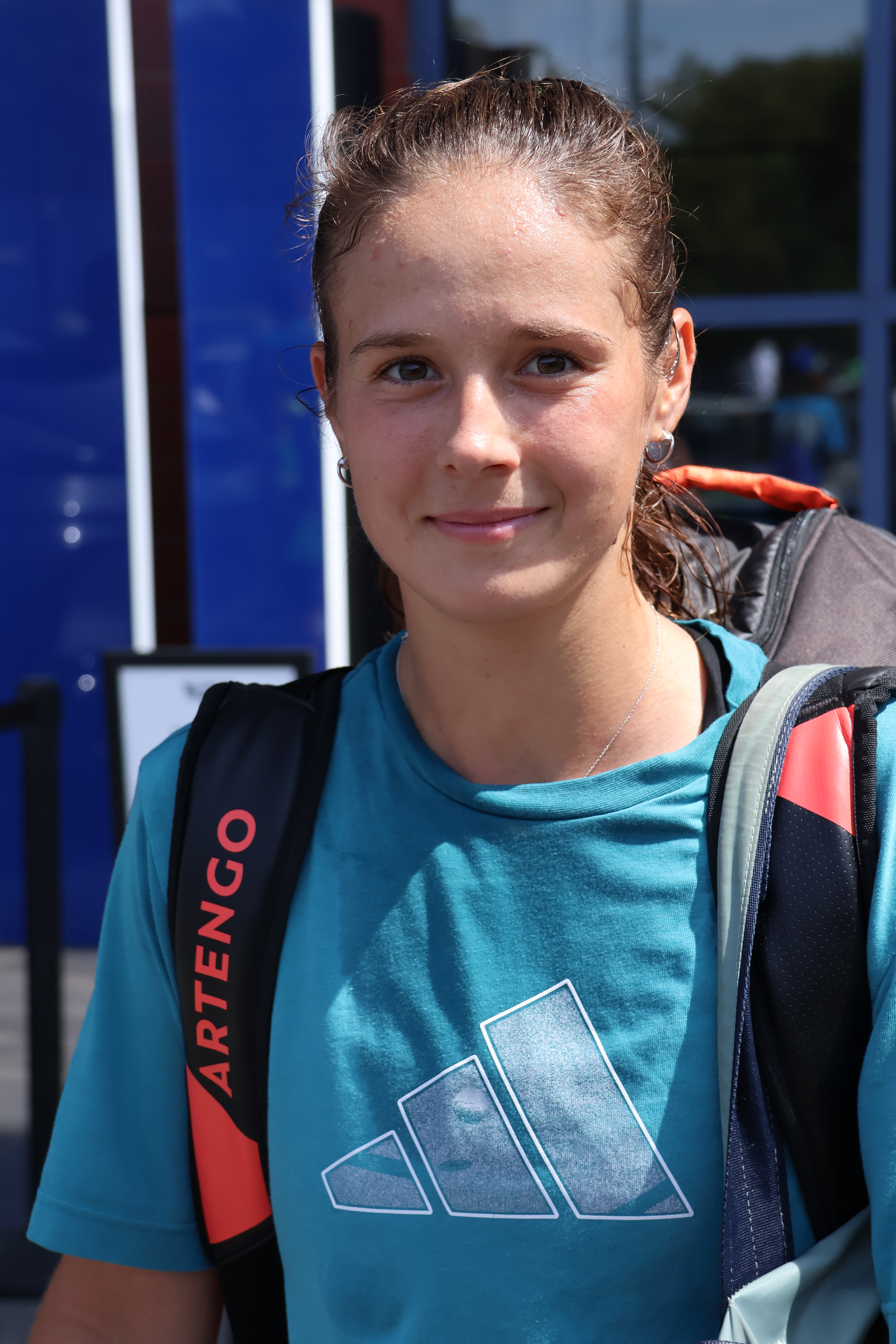
Kasatkina at the 2023 US Open where she reached the fourth round, a year after her coming out and condemnation of the war in Ukraine

Kasatkina said that she "found living in the closet impossible" and also speaking out against the attitudes towards the LGBTQ+ community and restrictions of rights within Russia. In that same interview, she condemned the Russian invasion of Ukraine, calling for an end to Russian aggression and showing solidarity with the Ukrainian people. As a result of her sexuality, Kasatkina is unsure of what will happen to her if she ever chooses to return to Russia to see her friends and family, but she has stated that she doesn't regret her decision. In June 2023, she expressed her understanding for Ukrainian players who refused to shake her hand after matches, saying "It’s a very sad situation and I understand." After she switched her nationality to Australia, Ukrainian players resumed shaking her hand, out of respect for her speaking out against the war.

== Career statistics ==
=== Grand Slam tournament performance timelines ===
Key
W	F	SF	QF	#R	RR	Q#	DNQ	A	NH

(W) winner; (F) finalist; (SF) semifinalist; (QF) quarterfinalist; (#R) rounds 4, 3, 2, 1; (RR) round-robin stage; (Q#) qualification round; (DNQ) did not qualify; (A) absent; (NH) not held; (SR) strike rate (events won / competed); (W–L) win–loss record.
To avoid confusion and double counting, these charts are updated at the conclusion of a tournament or when the player's participation has ended.

==== Singles ====
Current through the 2026 Wimbledon Championships.

Tournament	2015	2016	2017	2018	2019	2020	2021	2022	2023	2024	2025	2026	SR	W–L	Win %
Australian Open	A	3R	1R	2R	1R	1R	2R	3R	1R	2R	4R	1R	0 / 11	10–11	48%
French Open	A	3R	3R	QF	2R	2R	3R	SF	4R	2R	4R	3R	0 / 11	26–11	70%
Wimbledon	A	3R	2R	QF	1R	NH	2R	A	3R	3R	3R	3R	0 / 9	16–9	64%
US Open	3R	1R	4R	2R	1R	1R	3R	1R	4R	2R	3R		0 / 11	14–11	56%
Win–loss	2–1	6–4	6–4	10–4	1–4	1–3	6–4	7–3	8–4	5–4	10–4	4–3	0 / 42	66–42	61%

==== Doubles ====
Tournament	2016	2017	2018	2019	2020	2021	2022	2023	2024	2025	SR	W–L	Win %
Australian Open	2R	1R	1R	A	A	1R	1R	A	A	A	0 / 5	1–5	17%
French Open	1R	2R	1R	3R	A	A	A	A	A	A	0 / 4	3–4	43%
Wimbledon	3R	A	A	1R	NH	1R	A	A	A	A	0 / 3	2–3	40%
US Open	2R	3R	A	2R^{1}	A	2R	A	A	A	A	0 / 4	5–3	63%
Win–loss	4–4	3–3	0–2	3–2	0–0	1–3	0–1	0–0	0–0	0–0	0 / 16	11–15	42%

Note: ^{1}Kasatkina and Anett Kontaveit withdrew from the 2019 US Open before their second-round match, which does not officially count as a loss.

=== WTA 1000 tournament finals ===
==== Singles: 1 (runner-up) ====
Result	Year	Tournament	Surface	Opponent	Score
Loss	2018	Indian Wells Open	Hard	(Japan) Naomi Osaka	3–6, 2–6

== Awards ==
- The Russian Cup in the nominations:
  - Team of the Year – Girls under-14: 2011;
  - Team of the Year – Girls under-16: 2012, 2013;
  - Junior of the Year: 2014;
  - Team of the Year: 2021.
