= Empire Tennis Academy =

Tennis club and academy in Trnava, Slovakia

Empire Tennis Academy Trnava

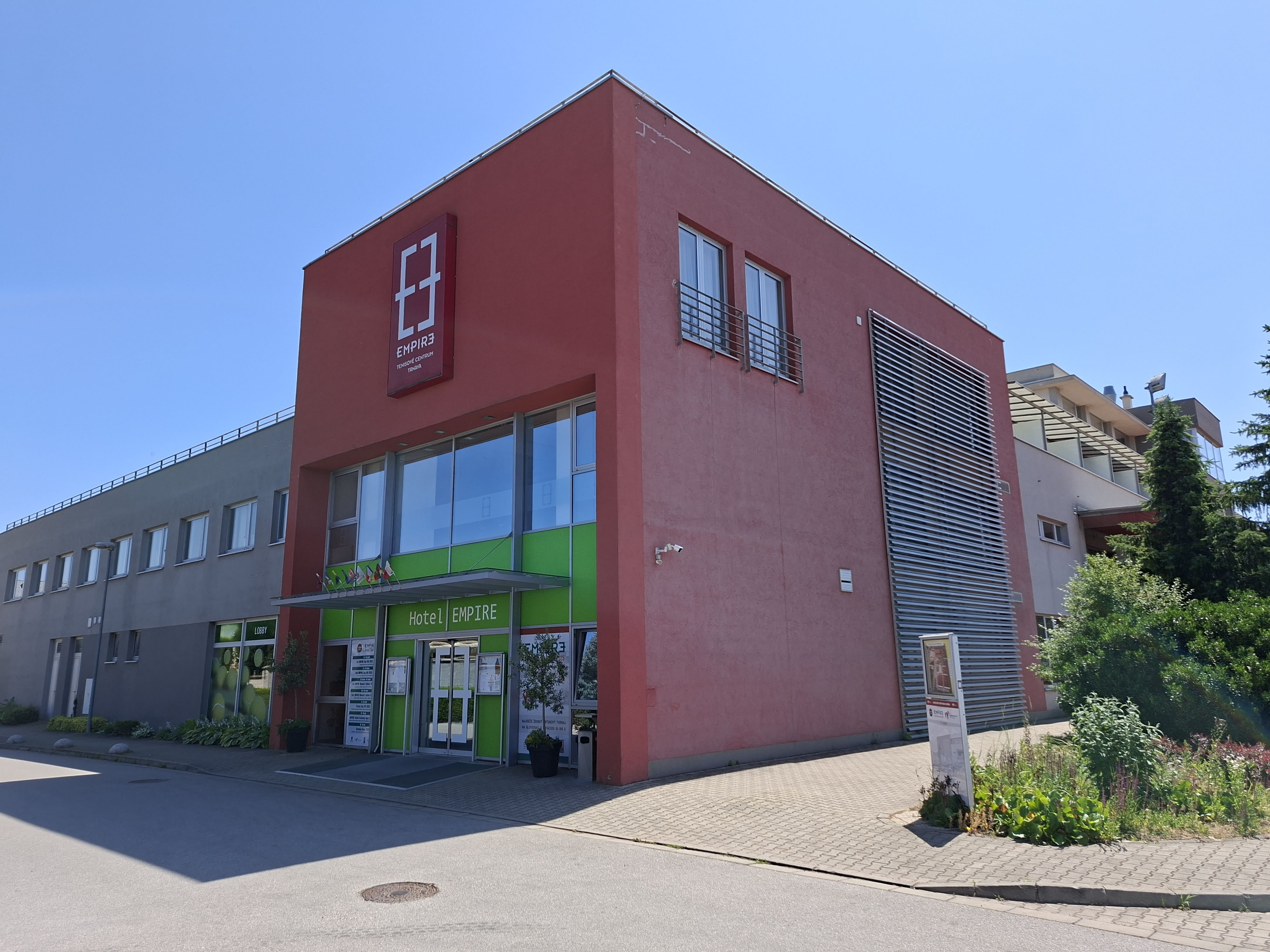
- Hotel of EMPIRE
- Formation: 2006; 20 years ago
- Founder: Miroslav Hlavna
- Purpose: Sport
- Location: Trnava, Slovakia
- Coordinates: 48.387173376206015°N 17.58760971064301°E
- Director: Tomáš Boleman
- Website: tcempire.sk

Empire Tennis Academy Trnava is a tennis academy and training center in Trnava, Slovakia. It hosts the Empire Women's Indoor and Empire Slovak Open tournaments.

== History ==
The club was founded in 2006 in the Slávia sports complex, which was built in Trnava in the early 1970s. The complex has 13 clay courts and three indoor courts with Plexipave Plexicushion Prestige surfaces, which were used at the Australian Open. The complex includes the EMPIRE hotel with wellness and services for athletes.

The academy with tennis courts is part of the larger Slávia sports complex, which also houses an athletics stadium with a tartan track. The tennis courts are open to the public and to junior players in training. TC Empire Trnava plays in the Slovak men's and women's tennis Extraliga.

== Notable people ==
=== Notable players ===
- Andrej Martin
- Tereza Mihalíková
- Anna Blinkova
- Elina Svitolina (2016-2020)
- Daria Kasatkina (2014-2020)

=== Notable coaches ===
- Vladimír Pláteník
