= Jaime Fillol Jr. =

Chilean tennis player

- Full name: Jaime Fillol Haggstrom
- Country (sports): Chile
- Born: 11 March 1976 (age 50) Santiago, Chile
- Plays: Left-handed
- Prize money: $24,167

Singles
- Highest ranking: No. 861 (6 Aug 2001)

Doubles
- Career record: 0–4 (ATP Tour)
- Highest ranking: No. 159 (15 Jul 2002)

Jaime Fillol Haggstrom (born 11 March 1976) is a Chilean former professional tennis player.

Fillol, the only son of famous Chilean tennis player Jaime Sr, was born in Santiago but spent his early childhood in Los Angeles. His mother, Mindy Haggstrom, is an American. He later returned to the United States and played collegiate tennis at Florida International University.

A left-handed doubles specialist, Fillol won eight ITF Futures titles, one ATP Challenger tournament and featured in the main draw of four ATP Tour events during his career, with his best doubles ranking of 159 reached in 2002.

In addition to his father, Fillol's uncle (Álvaro Fillol) and nephew (Nicolás Jarry) have also played Davis Cup for Chile. His brother-in-law is former Argentine player Martín Rodríguez.

== Challenger/Futures titles ==
=== Doubles ===
Legend
ATP Challenger (1)
ITF Futures (8)

No.	Date	Tournament	Tier	Surface	Partner	Opponents	Score
1.	Oct 1999	Bolivia F2, Cochabamba	Futures	Clay	(Chile) Adrián García	(Argentina) Rodrigo Pena (Argentina) Sergio Roitman	6–3, 4–6, 6–3
2.	Oct 1999	Paraguay F2, Asunción	Futures	Clay	(Chile) Adrián García	(Argentina) Daniel Caracciolo (Hungary) Gergely Kisgyörgy	4–6, 6–0, 6–1
3.	Nov 1999	Chile F3, Valparaíso	Futures	Clay	(Chile) Adrián García	(Argentina) Daniel Caracciolo (Chile) Luis Hormazábal	6–3, 2–6, 6–4
4.	Dec 1999	Chile F6, Santiago	Futures	Clay	(Chile) Adrián García	(Argentina) Daniel Caracciolo (Argentina) Ignacio González King	w/o
5.	Jun 2000	Canada F2, Montreal	Futures	Hard	(United States) Michael Jessup	(United States) Mardy Fish (United States) Bo Hodge	6–3, 6–0
6.	Sep 2000	Bolivia F1, La Paz	Futures	Clay	(Chile) Miguel Miranda	(Argentina) Patricio Arquez (Argentina) Ignacio González King	6–3, 6–4
7.	Nov 2000	Chile F7, Valparaíso	Futures	Clay	(Argentina) Ignacio González King	(Brazil) Márcio Carlsson (Brazil) Ricardo Schlachter	6–4, 6–7^{(4)}, 7–5
8.	Jul 2001	Italy F8, Trani	Futures	Clay	(Chile) Miguel Miranda	(United States) Rafael de Mesa (Argentina) Nicolás Todero	7–5, 7–6^{(3)}
1.	Jul 2002	Oberstaufen Challenger, Oberstaufen	Challenger	Clay	(Brazil) Ricardo Schlachter	(Argentina) Patricio Arquez (Argentina) Sergio Roitman	6–2, 6–4
