= List of Croatia Davis Cup team representatives =

This is a list of tennis players who have represented the Croatia Davis Cup team in an official Davis Cup match. Croatia have taken part in the competition since 1993. Previously, Croatians were members of the Yugoslavia Davis Cup team.

== Players ==
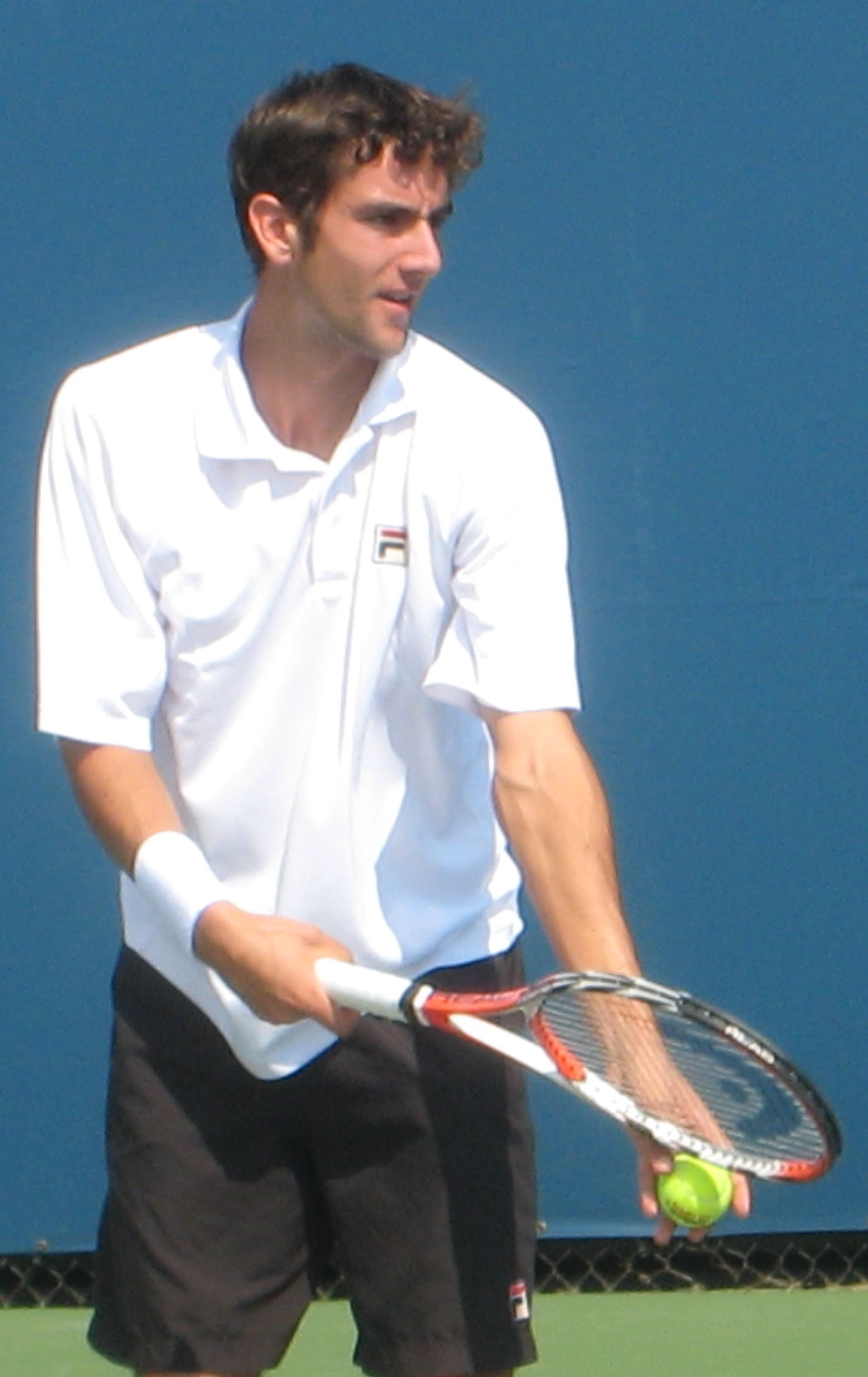
Marin Čilić

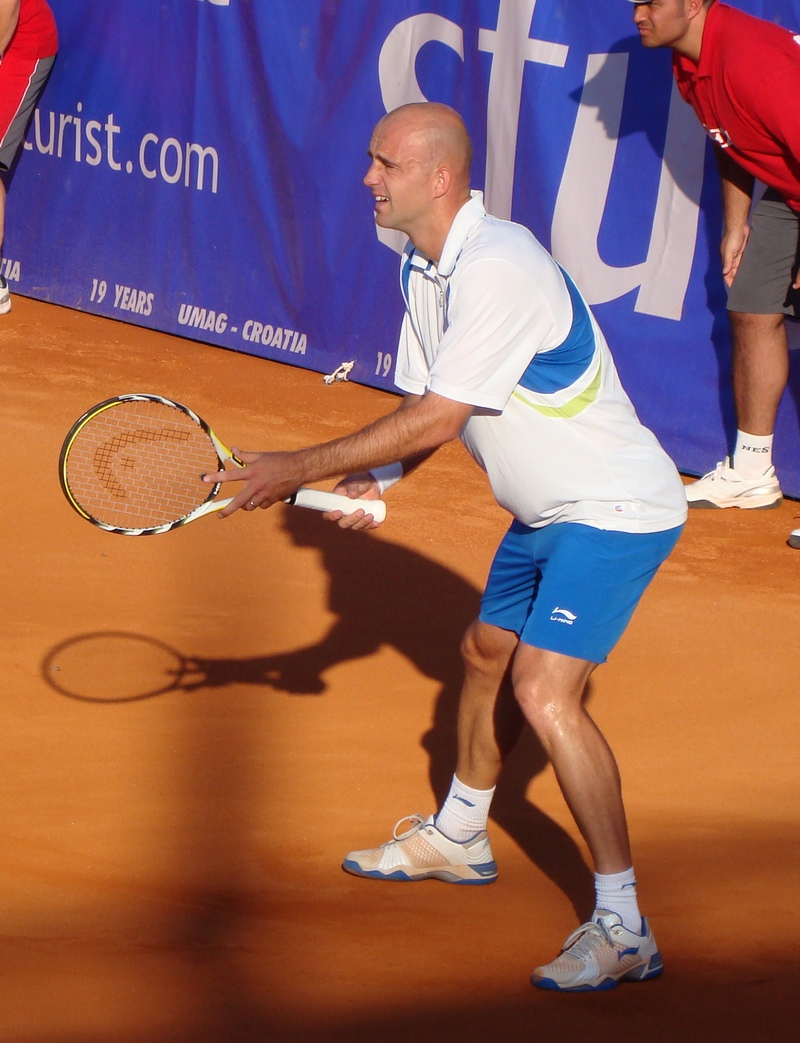
Ivan Ljubičić

Player	W-L (Total)	W-L (Singles)	W-L (Doubles)	Ties	Debut
Mario Ančić	21–13	13–11	8–2	18	1999
Ivan Beroš	1–0	1–0	0–0	1	1999
Ivan Cerović	0–1	0–1	0–0	1	2006
Marin Čilić	18–13	14–7	4–6	14	2006
Borna Ćorić	0–1	0–1	0–0	1	2013
Ivan Dodig	4–11	2–7	2–4	7	2010
Saša Hiršzon	11–12	6–8	5–4	9	1994
Goran Ivanišević	33–11	20–6	13–5	18	1993
Roko Karanušić	2–6	2–5	0–1	6	2005
Ivo Karlović	13–12	9–8	4–4	14	2000
Željko Krajan	1–2	1–2	0–0	3	1998
Ivan Ljubičić	36–19	23–13	13–6	22	1998
Nikola Mektić	1–0	1–0	0–0	1	2011
Goran Orešić	1–1	1–1	0–0	2	1996
Mate Pavić	0–2	0–1	0–1	1	2013
Goran Prpić	1–5	1–3	0–2	2	1993
Igor Šarić	2–0	2–0	0–0	2	1994
Saša Tuksar	0–2	0–2	0–0	2	2004
Ivan Vajda	0–1	0–1	0–0	1	2001
Antonio Veić	1–2	1–2	0–0	3	2010
Lovro Zovko	6–9	5–2	1–7	10	1998
