= Scott Clark (illustrator) =

Scott Clark (November 23, 1969 – February 21, 2013) was an American comic book artist who worked for Wildstorm, Marvel Comics, Aspen Comics, and DC Comics.

== Career ==
Scott Clark began his career in the 1990s, initially working for small publishers before being employed at Wildstorm and Marvel Comics. After working for a short time at Aspen Comics, he returned to DC Comics and Wildstorm, the latter of which had been purchased as an imprint of the former. Clark worked on the series Brightest Day; following DC's 2011 New 52 relaunch of its entire monthly line of titles, Clark worked on the series Grifter and Deathstroke as well as Martian Manhunter backup stories in the series Justice League of America.

Clark died on February 21, 2013.
