= Ivan Vajda =

Croatian tennis player

- Full name: Ivan Vajda
- Country (sports): Croatia
- Born: 4 September 1978 (age 47)
- Prize money: $51,136

Singles
- Career record: 0–2
- Highest ranking: No. 223 (11 June 2001)

Doubles
- Career record: 0–1
- Highest ranking: No. 482 (6 August 2001)

Ivan Vajda (born 4 September 1978) is a former professional tennis player from Croatia.

== Biography ==
Vajda, who was born in 1978, began his career on the satellite tour in 1995. He won his first Futures title in 1998, the Pakistan F1 in Islamabad, then in 2000 he won the Macedonia F3 tournament held in Skopje. His two ATP Tour main draw appearances in singles both came at the Croatia Open Umag, as a qualifier in 2000 and as a wildcard entrant in the 2001 tournament. In June 2001 he reached his best ranking of 223 in the world and made the second round of qualifying at the Wimbledon Championships. Later that year he appeared for the Croatia Davis Cup team in a World Group qualifying tie against Italy in Rome. He featured in a dead rubber reverse singles match, which he lost to Italian Filippo Volandri.

Retiring in 2007, Vajda now works as a tennis coach based in Zagreb, where he runs a tennis academy.

== See also ==
- List of Croatia Davis Cup team representatives
