= Lee Jong-min (tennis) =

South Korean tennis player

- Country (sports): South Korea
- Born: 1977 (age 47–48); Seoul, South Korea
- Height: 1.78 m (5 ft 10 in)
- Plays: Right-handed
- College: UCLA Bruins
- Prize money: $3,125

Singles
- Career record: 0–0
- Career titles: 0; 0 Challenger, 9 Futures
- Highest ranking: No. 1242 (10 June 1996)

Doubles
- Career record: 2–2 (ATP Tour & Davis Cup)
- Career titles: 0; 0 Challenger, 9 Futures
- Highest ranking: No. 421 (28 October 1996)
- Last updated on: 25 July 2023.

Lee Jong-min (born 1977) is a South Korean former professional tennis player.

Born in Seoul, Lee moved to Australia as an 11-year old to pursue a career in tennis and studied at Geelong Grammar School 1989–1992 then Geelong College from 1993 to 1995. Locally he won national singles championships in both the 16s and 18s age groups, as well as finishing runner-up to Nicolas Kiefer at the 1995 Australian Open juniors. He won that year's Australian Open boys' doubles title (with Luke Bourgeois) and also claimed the 1995 US Open title (with Jocelyn Robichaud).

Lee represented South Korea in a 1996 Davis Cup tie against New Zealand in Seoul and featured mainly on the professional tour as a specialist doubles player, for which he attained a world ranking of 421.

From 1997 to 1999, Lee attended UC Santa Barbara, then from 1999 to 2000 he was at the University of California, Los Angeles. He was a two-time All-American tennis player for the UCLA Bruins.

== Junior Grand Slam finals ==
=== Singles: 1 (1 runner-up) ===
Result	Year	Tournament	Surface	Opponent	Score
Loss	1995	Australian Open	Hard	(Germany) Nicolas Kiefer	4–6, 4–6

=== Doubles: 2 (2 titles) ===
Result	Year	Tournament	Surface	Partner	Opponents	Score
Win	1995	Australian Open	Hard	(Australia) Luke Bourgeois	(Germany) Ulrich Jasper Seetzen (Germany) Nicolas Kiefer	6–2, 6–1
Win	1995	US Open	Hard	(Canada) Jocelyn Robichaud	(Netherlands) Raemon Sluiter (Netherlands) Peter Wessels	7–6, 6–2

== See also ==
- List of South Korea Davis Cup team representatives
