= Ivan Beroš =

Croatian tennis player

- Full name: Ivan Beroš
- Country (sports): Croatia
- Born: 30 December 1979 (age 45); Makarska, SR Croatia, SFR Yugoslavia
- Plays: Right-handed
- Prize money: $18,869

Singles
- Career record: 0–1
- Highest ranking: No. 260 (2 October 2000)

Doubles
- Highest ranking: No. 572 (26 April 1999)

Ivan Beroš (born 30 December 1979) is a former professional tennis player from Croatia.

== Biography ==
A right-handed player from Makarska, Beroš had a best ranking on tour of 260 in the world. His only ATP Tour main draw appearance came at the 1999 Croatia Open Umag, where featured as a qualifier and was beaten in three sets by Finland's Ville Liukko in the first round. He represented the Croatia Davis Cup team in a 1999 tie against Romania in Bucharest, winning the only Davis Cup match he played, over Gabriel Trifu in what was a dead rubber.

He is a former coach of Mirjana Lučić.

== See also ==
- List of Croatia Davis Cup team representatives
