= Scott Clark (tennis) =

New Zealand tennis player

- Full name: Scott Michael Anderson Clark
- Country (sports): New Zealand
- Born: 5 May 1977 (age 49)

Singles
- Career record: 0–2 (ATP Tour & Davis Cup)

Grand Slam singles results
- Australian Open: Q1 (1996)

Scott Michael Anderson Clark (born 5 May 1977) was a New Zealand professional tennis player.

Clark, raised in Auckland, competed on the international tour during the 1990s. A junior doubles quarter-finalist at Wimbledon, he made an ATP Tour main draw appearance at the 1995 Auckland Open and represented New Zealand in a 1995 Davis Cup tie against South Korea in Christchurch. He was beaten in his singles rubber by Lee Hyung-taik.

Ending his professional tennis career in 1996, Clark played varsity tennis while attending Harvard University, graduating in 2001 with a bachelor's degree in economics. He now works as a banker in New York City.

== See also ==
- List of New Zealand Davis Cup team representatives
