= Goran Orešić =

Croatian tennis player

- Full name: Goran Orešić
- Country (sports): Croatia
- Born: 28 April 1975 (age 49)
- Prize money: $18,532

Singles
- Career record: 0–2
- Highest ranking: No. 368 (19 August 1996)

Doubles
- Career record: 2–3
- Highest ranking: No. 284 (23 June 1997)

Goran Orešić (born 28 April 1975) is a former professional tennis player from Croatia.

== Biography ==
Orešić played in two Davis Cup ties for the Croatian team, both in 1996. He debuted in the reverse singles of a tie against Ukraine, with his win over Sergei Yaroshenko securing a 5–0 scoreline. His other appearance came in the World Group qualifier against Australia in Split, where he was beaten by Mark Philippoussis.

On the ATP Tour he twice featured in the singles main draw of the Croatia Open Umag, as a qualifier in 1995 and 1996. As a doubles player he made the quarter-finals of the Zagreb Indoors in 1996 and 1997.

He is a former coach of Croatian player Ivo Karlović, who was his childhood friend and former doubles partner. His time as coach included Karlović's win over top seed Lleyton Hewitt at the 2003 Wimbledon Championships.

== See also ==
- List of Croatia Davis Cup team representatives
