= Tomáš Čatár =

Slovak tennis player

- Country (sports): Slovakia
- Born: 19 January 1977 (age 48)
- Prize money: $43,891

Singles
- Career record: 0–1
- Highest ranking: No. 239 (21 September 1998)

Grand Slam singles results
- Australian Open: Q1 (1998, 1999)

Doubles
- Career record: 1–1
- Highest ranking: No. 388 (17 July 2000)

Tomáš Čatár (born 19 January 1977) is a Slovak former professional tennis player.

== Biography ==
Čatár, who grew up in Bratislava, was a junior semi-finalist at the 1995 French Open and was ranked in the top 10 on the ITF junior world rankings.

On the professional circuit he reached a career high singles ranking of 239 in the world and made his only ATP Tour main draw appearances at the 1998 Croatia Open Umag, as a qualifier. He twice featured in the qualifying draw for the Australian Open.

In 1999 he competed for Slovakia at the World Team Cup in Düsseldorf, alongside Karol Kučera and Dominik Hrbatý. He played in two doubles matches, both partnering Hrbaty, against France and the United States. They won the match against France, who were represented by Nicolas Escudé and Guillaume Raoux. He was also a member of the Slovak Davis Cup Team.

A graduate of Auburn University, Čatár is now based in Fairhope, Alabama and works as a tennis and pickleball coach for the City of Fairhope. Catar also serves as a national coach developer for the PTR (Professional Tennis Registry) and PPR (Professional Pickleball Registry).

He and his daughter Claudia Catar won the USTA National Father/Daughter grass courts and clay courts championships and finished as the number one team in the US in 2023.
