= 1994 US Open – Men's singles qualifying =

Men's singles qualifying
- 1994 US Open

Events
Singles	men	women		boys	girls
Doubles	men	women	mixed	boys	girls
WC Singles	men	women	quad
WC Doubles	men	women	quad
Legends	men	women	mixed

Qualification
Singles	men	women
- US Open

Players who neither had high enough rankings nor received wild cards to enter the main draw of the annual US Open Tennis Championships participated in a qualifying tournament held over several days before the event.

== Seeds ==
1. (Germany) Oliver Gross (qualifying competition, lucky loser)
2. (Australia) Brent Larkham (qualifying competition)
3. (Germany) Alexander Mronz (qualifying competition)
4. (Venezuela) Nicolás Pereira (qualified)
5. (Ukraine) Dimitri Poliakov (first round)
6. (Chile) Marcelo Ríos (qualified)
7. (Canada) Sébastien Lareau (qualifying competition)
8. (Australia) Michael Tebbutt (first round)
9. (Italy) Gianluca Pozzi (qualified)
10. (Japan) Shuzo Matsuoka (second round)
11. (Australia) Todd Woodbridge (qualified)
12. (France) Stéphane Simian (second round)
13. (India) Leander Paes (qualified)
14. (Spain) Alejo Mancisidor (qualifying competition)
15. (Italy) Cristiano Caratti (first round)
16. (Germany) Lars Rehmann (first round)
17. (Australia) Neil Borwick (qualified)
18. (South Africa) Christo van Rensburg (first round)
19. (Peru) José Luis Noriega (qualifying competition)
20. (Mexico) Oscar Ortiz (first round)
21. (Argentina) Patricio Arnold (first round)
22. (South Africa) David Adams (first round)
23. (Italy) Daniele Musa (qualified)
24. (France) Lionel Barthez (qualifying competition)
25. (Canada) Daniel Nestor (first round)
26. (Italy) Davide Sanguinetti (first round)
27. (South Africa) Mark Kaplan (second round)
28. (Canada) Albert Chang (qualified)
29. (Italy) Laurence Tieleman (first round)
30. (United States) Kenny Thorne (qualifying competition)
31. (The Bahamas) Roger Smith (qualified)
32. (Brazil) Danilo Marcelino (first round)

== Qualifiers ==
1. (The Bahamas) Roger Smith
2. (Sweden) Robert Eriksson
3. (Australia) Paul Kilderry
4. (Venezuela) Nicolás Pereira
5. (Canada) Albert Chang
6. (Chile) Marcelo Ríos
7. (Australia) Grant Doyle
8. (Sweden) Lars-Anders Wahlgren
9. (Italy) Gianluca Pozzi
10. (Italy) Daniele Musa
11. (Australia) Todd Woodbridge
12. (South Africa) Ellis Ferreira
13. (India) Leander Paes
14. (South Africa) Kevin Ullyett
15. (Egypt) Tamer El-Sawy
16. (Australia) Neil Borwick

== Lucky losers ==
1. (Germany) Oliver Gross

== Qualifying draw ==
Key

- Q = Qualifier
- WC = Wild card
- LL = Lucky loser
- Alt = Alternate
- ITF = ITF entry
- PR = Protected ranking
- SR = Special ranking
- SE = Special exempt
- JE = Junior exempt
- JR = Junior Accelerator Programme entrant
- CO = College Accelerator Programme entrant
- NG = Next Gen Accelerator Program entrant
- w/o = Walkover
- r = Retired
- d = Defaulted

=== First qualifier ===
First round
1	(Germany) Oliver Gross	6	6
(United States) Donny Isaak	2	3
(Colombia) Jaime Cortés	6	2	7
(United States) John Sullivan	3	6	6
(United States) Michael Zimmerman	6	6
(United States) Stephen Herdoiza	3	3
WC	(United States) William Ball	3	3
31	(The Bahamas) Roger Smith	6	6

Second round
1	(Germany) Oliver Gross	6	6
(Colombia) Jaime Cortés	2	2
(United States) Michael Zimmerman	3	4
31	(The Bahamas) Roger Smith	6	6

Qualifying competition
1	(Germany) Oliver Gross	1	6	4
31	(The Bahamas) Roger Smith	6	3	6

=== Second qualifier ===
First round
2	(Australia) Brent Larkham	7	6
WC	(United States) Cecil Mamiit	5	1
(United States) Chris Woodruff	4	4
(Nigeria) Sulieman Ladipo	6	6
(Sweden) Robert Eriksson	6	4	6
(Argentina) Martin Stringari	2	6	1
(United Kingdom) Danny Sapsford	7	6
32	(Brazil) Danilo Marcelino	6	0

Second round
2	(Australia) Brent Larkham	6	7
(Nigeria) Sulieman Ladipo	3	6
(Sweden) Robert Eriksson	6	6
(United Kingdom) Danny Sapsford	3	3

Qualifying competition
2	(Australia) Brent Larkham	7	3	4
(Sweden) Robert Eriksson	6	6	6

=== Third qualifier ===
First round
3	(Germany) Alexander Mronz	7	6
(Ecuador) Nicolás Lapentti	6	2
WC	(United States) Jimmy Jackson	6	4	5
(Argentina) Carlos Gómez-Díaz	2	6	7
(Chile) Felipe Rivera	6	6
(Belgium) Cedric Melot	3	1
(Australia) Paul Kilderry	6	6
29	(Italy) Laurence Tieleman	0	4

Second round
3	(Germany) Alexander Mronz	6	6
(Argentina) Carlos Gómez-Díaz	3	2
(Chile) Felipe Rivera	4	5
(Australia) Paul Kilderry	6	7

Qualifying competition
3	(Germany) Alexander Mronz	6	6
(Australia) Paul Kilderry	7	7

=== Fourth qualifier ===
First round
4	(Venezuela) Nicolás Pereira	6	6
(Australia) Andrew Ilie	1	4
(Canada) Brian Gyetko	6	6
(South Africa) Lan Bale	1	0
(Spain) Vicente Solves	3	2
(France) Stéphane Matheu	6	6
(Netherlands) Fernon Wibier	4	6	6
30	(United States) Kenny Thorne	6	3	7

Second round
4	(Venezuela) Nicolás Pereira	6	7
(Canada) Brian Gyetko	4	6
(France) Stéphane Matheu	4	4
30	(United States) Kenny Thorne	6	6

Qualifying competition
4	(Venezuela) Nicolás Pereira	6	2	6
30	(United States) Kenny Thorne	1	6	4

=== Fifth qualifier ===
First round
5	(Ukraine) Dimitri Poliakov	3	3
(Japan) Gouichi Motomura	6	6
(Ukraine) Andrei Rybalko	4	7	6
(Denmark) Patrik Langvardt	6	5	4
(United States) Michael Roberts	6	2	4
WC	(United States) Daryl Wyatt	1	6	6
(Netherlands) Stephen Noteboom	1^{r}
28	(Canada) Albert Chang	3

Second round
(Japan) Gouichi Motomura	6	6	0
(Ukraine) Andrei Rybalko	3	7	6
WC	(United States) Daryl Wyatt	3	6	3
28	(Canada) Albert Chang	6	4	6

Qualifying competition
(Ukraine) Andrei Rybalko	3	4
28	(Canada) Albert Chang	6	6

=== Sixth qualifier ===
First round
6	(Chile) Marcelo Ríos	7	6
(United States) Brian MacPhie	5	3
(United States) Jimmy Arias	3	4
(Sweden) Thomas Johansson	6	6
(Sweden) Peter Lundgren	4	3
WC	(United States) Steve Campbell	6	6
WC	(United States) Scott Humphries	2	6
27	(South Africa) Mark Kaplan	6	7

Second round
6	(Chile) Marcelo Ríos	6	6
(Sweden) Thomas Johansson	2	1
WC	(United States) Steve Campbell	7	6
27	(South Africa) Mark Kaplan	5	2

Qualifying competition
6	(Chile) Marcelo Ríos	4	6	6
WC	(United States) Steve Campbell	6	1	1

=== Seventh qualifier ===
First round
7	(Canada) Sébastien Lareau	0	6	6
(Sweden) David Engel	6	4	0
(United States) Brian Dunn	4	6	3
(Mexico) Leonardo Lavalle	6	3	6
(Belgium) Fabien Cousin	6	6	6
(The Bahamas) Mark Knowles	7	4	3
(Australia) Grant Doyle	6	5	6
26	(Italy) Davide Sanguinetti	3	7	4

Second round
7	(Canada) Sébastien Lareau	7	6
(Mexico) Leonardo Lavalle	5	2
(Belgium) Fabien Cousin	6	6	4
(Australia) Grant Doyle	7	4	6

Qualifying competition
7	(Canada) Sébastien Lareau	4	5
(Australia) Grant Doyle	6	7

=== Eighth qualifier ===
First round
8	(Australia) Michael Tebbutt	6	6	4
(United States) David Hall	7	4	6
(United States) Todd Nelson	6	6
(Paraguay) Ricardo Mena	4	2
(Sweden) Lars-Anders Wahlgren	7	6
(Sweden) Roland Thornqvist	6	4
(Israel) Eyal Erlich	7	7
25	(Canada) Daniel Nestor	6	6

Second round
(United States) David Hall	1	6	5
(United States) Todd Nelson	6	2	7
(Sweden) Lars-Anders Wahlgren	6	6
(Israel) Eyal Erlich	4	3

Qualifying competition
(United States) Todd Nelson	2	6	3
(Sweden) Lars-Anders Wahlgren	6	3	6

=== Ninth qualifier ===
First round
9	(Italy) Gianluca Pozzi	6	5	6
(Denmark) Frederik Fetterlein	2	7	2
(United States) Kent Kinnear	3	4
(Canada) Grant Connell	6	6
(Russia) Igor Kornienko	6	6
(Australia) Michael Hegarty	1	2
WC	(United States) Mashiska Washington	4	2
24	(France) Lionel Barthez	6	6

Second round
9	(Italy) Gianluca Pozzi	6	6
(Canada) Grant Connell	4	2
(Russia) Igor Kornienko	1	5
24	(France) Lionel Barthez	6	7

Qualifying competition
9	(Italy) Gianluca Pozzi	6	6
24	(France) Lionel Barthez	2	2

=== Tenth qualifier ===
First round
10	(Japan) Shuzo Matsuoka	3	7	6
(Netherlands) Joost Winnink	6	6	3
(Canada) Andrew Sznajder	6	6	6
(Australia) Joshua Eagle	7	1	4
(United States) Louis Gloria	6	6
(Netherlands) Sjeng Schalken	2	4
(United Kingdom) Chris Bailey	6	6	1
23	(Italy) Daniele Musa	7	3	6

Second round
10	(Japan) Shuzo Matsuoka	1	1
(Canada) Andrew Sznajder	6	6
(United States) Louis Gloria	6	4
23	(Italy) Daniele Musa	7	6

Qualifying competition
(Canada) Andrew Sznajder	4	6	2
23	(Italy) Daniele Musa	6	4	6

=== Eleventh qualifier ===
First round
11	(Australia) Todd Woodbridge	6	6
(Argentina) Juan Garat	4	0
(Japan) Yasufumi Yamamoto	2	3
(France) Jérôme Golmard	6	6
(Argentina) Diego del Río	6	5	3
(Switzerland) Sandro Della Piana	3	7	6
(Sweden) Johan Carlsson	6	2	6
22	(South Africa) David Adams	4	6	4

Second round
11	(Australia) Todd Woodbridge	6	3	6
(France) Jérôme Golmard	4	6	2
(Switzerland) Sandro Della Piana	2	6	2
(Sweden) Johan Carlsson	6	2	6

Qualifying competition
11	(Australia) Todd Woodbridge	6	6
(Sweden) Johan Carlsson	2	3

=== Twelfth qualifier ===
First round
12	(France) Stéphane Simian	6	7
(China) Pan Bing	4	5
(South Africa) Ellis Ferreira	6	5	7
(Italy) Massimo Valeri	4	7	5
(Australia) Peter Tramacchi	2	4
(Romania) Andrei Pavel	6	6
(France) Daniel Courcol	6	6
21	(Argentina) Patricio Arnold	4	4

Second round
12	(France) Stéphane Simian	1	5
(South Africa) Ellis Ferreira	6	7
(Romania) Andrei Pavel	4	4
(France) Daniel Courcol	6	6

Qualifying competition
(South Africa) Ellis Ferreira	6	6
(France) Daniel Courcol	3	1

=== Thirteenth qualifier ===
First round
13	(India) Leander Paes	7	6
(United States) David DiLucia	5	3
(France) Frederic Vitoux	3	6	3
(Israel) Eyal Ran	6	3	6
(United States) Doug Flach	6	5	6
(Argentina) Christian Miniussi	2	7	3
(Israel) Ofer Sela	3	7	1
19	(Peru) José Luis Noriega	6	5	6

Second round
13	(India) Leander Paes	6	6
(Israel) Eyal Ran	2	1
(United States) Doug Flach	4	2
19	(Peru) José Luis Noriega	6	6

Qualifying competition
13	(India) Leander Paes	4	6	6
19	(Peru) José Luis Noriega	6	3	4

=== Fourteenth qualifier ===
First round
14	(Spain) Alejo Mancisidor	3	6	7
(United States) Richard Matuszewski	6	4	5
(United States) Keith Evans	2	0
(Austria) Gerald Mandl	6	6
(South Africa) Kevin Ullyett	7	6
WC	(Philippines) Bryan Juinio	6	3
(United States) Geoff Grant	7	6
20	(Mexico) Oscar Ortiz	6	4

Second round
14	(Spain) Alejo Mancisidor	6	6
(Austria) Gerald Mandl	2	3
(South Africa) Kevin Ullyett	6	6
(United States) Geoff Grant	4	2

Qualifying competition
14	(Spain) Alejo Mancisidor	1	6	4
(South Africa) Kevin Ullyett	6	3	6

=== Fifteenth qualifier ===
First round
15	(Italy) Cristiano Caratti	3	1
(United States) Ivan Baron	6	6
(United States) Jonathan Canter	6	3	6
(United States) Chris Garner	3	6	4
(Sweden) Thomas Högstedt	6	3	4
(Sweden) Mikael Stadling	2	6	6
(Egypt) Tamer El-Sawy	6	2	7
18	(South Africa) Christo van Rensburg	4	6	5

Second round
(United States) Ivan Baron	2	6	6
(United States) Jonathan Canter	6	2	2
(Sweden) Mikael Stadling	1	4
(Egypt) Tamer El-Sawy	6	6

Qualifying competition
(United States) Ivan Baron	3	5
(Egypt) Tamer El-Sawy	6	7

=== Sixteenth qualifier ===
First round
16	(Germany) Lars Rehmann	4	6	4
(Argentina) Gastón Etlis	6	3	6
(United States) Martin Blackman	6	7
WC	(United States) Justin Gimelstob	4	5
(Australia) Mark Philippoussis	6	7
(Italy) Pietro Pennisi	2	6
(South Africa) David Nainkin	4	4
17	(Australia) Neil Borwick	6	6

Second round
(Argentina) Gastón Etlis	6	6
(United States) Martin Blackman	2	4
(Australia) Mark Philippoussis	3	4
17	(Australia) Neil Borwick	6	6

Qualifying competition
(Argentina) Gastón Etlis	1	4
17	(Australia) Neil Borwick	6	6
