= 1993 Lipton Championships – Men's singles =

Men's singles
- 1993 Lipton Championships

Final
- Champion: (United States) Pete Sampras
- Runner-up: (United States) MaliVai Washington
- Score: 6–3, 6–2

Details
- Draw: 96 (3WC/12Q/1LL)
- Seeds: 32

Events
Singles	men	women
Doubles	men	women
← 1992 ·	Lipton Championships	· 1994 →

Pete Sampras defeated MaliVai Washington in the final, 6–3, 6–2 to win the men's singles tennis title at the 1993 Miami Open.

Michael Chang was the defending champion, but lost in the second round to Marcos Ondruska.

== Seeds ==
All seeds receive a bye into the second round.

1. (United States) Jim Courier (fourth round)
2. (United States) Pete Sampras (champion)
3. (Sweden) Stefan Edberg (quarterfinals)
4. (Germany) Boris Becker (third round, withdrew)
5. (Czechoslovakia) Petr Korda (semifinals)
6. (Croatia) Goran Ivanišević (second round)
7. (United States) Michael Chang (second round)
8. (United States) Andre Agassi (fourth round)
9. (Germany) Michael Stich (fourth round)
10. (Netherlands) Richard Krajicek (quarterfinals)
11. (South Africa) Wayne Ferreira (second round)
12. (Austria) Thomas Muster (third round)
13. (France) Guy Forget (fourth round)
14. (United States) MaliVai Washington (final)
15. (Russia) Alexander Volkov (second round)
16. (Sweden) Henrik Holm (second round)
17. (Ukraine) Andrei Medvedev (fourth round)
18. (Australia) Mark Woodforde (quarterfinals)
19. (France) Arnaud Boetsch (third round)
20. (France) Fabrice Santoro (third round)
21. (Switzerland) Marc Rosset (fourth round)
22. (Argentina) Alberto Mancini (second round)
23. (France) ~~Cédric Pioline~~ (withdrew)
24. (Germany) Carl-Uwe Steeb (third round)
25. (Sweden) Magnus Larsson (second round)
26. (Spain) Emilio Sánchez (second round)
27. (Switzerland) Jakob Hlasek (third round)
28. (Spain) Francisco Clavet (second round)
29. (Sweden) Nicklas Kulti (fourth round)
30. (Brazil) Jaime Oncins (second round)
31. (Spain) Javier Sánchez (second round)
32. (Russia) Andrei Cherkasov (second round)

== Draw ==
Key

- Q = Qualifier
- WC = Wild card
- LL = Lucky loser
- Alt = Alternate
- ITF = ITF entry
- PR = Protected ranking
- SR = Special ranking
- SE = Special exempt
- JE = Junior exempt
- JR = Junior Accelerator Programme entrant
- CO = College Accelerator Programme entrant
- NG = Next Gen Accelerator Program entrant
- w/o = Walkover
- r = Retired
- d = Defaulted

=== Finals ===
Quarterfinals
18	(Australia) Mark Woodforde	4	2
(South Africa) Marcos Ondruska	6	6
14	(United States) MaliVai Washington	6	7^{8}
(United States) Patrick McEnroe	1	6^{6}
5	(Czech Republic) Petr Korda	7^{7}	7^{7}
3	(Sweden) Stefan Edberg	6^{3}	6^{5}
10	(Netherlands) Richard Krajicek	3	6^{7}
2	(United States) Pete Sampras	6	7^{9}

Semifinals
(South Africa) Marcos Ondruska	6	4	6^{5}
14	(United States) MaliVai Washington	2	6	7^{7}
5	(Czech Republic) Petr Korda	3	6	2
2	(United States) Pete Sampras	6	2	6

Final
14	(United States) MaliVai Washington	3	2
2	(United States) Pete Sampras	6	6

=== Top half ===
==== Section 1 ====
First round
(Zimbabwe) B Black	6	1	6
(Peru) J Yzaga	2	6	4
Q	(Sweden) M Pernfors	6	7
Q	(Canada) G Connell	4	5
(Switzerland) C Mezzadri	5	6	6
(Uruguay) M Filippini	7	1	4
(Russia) A Chesnokov	7	7^{9}
(United States) R Reneberg	7	6^{7}

Second round
1	(United States) J Courier	6	6
(Zimbabwe) B Black	2	2
Q	(Sweden) M Pernfors	1	7^{7}	7
31	(Spain) J Sánchez	6	6^{1}	5
18	(Australia) M Woodforde	6	6
(Switzerland) C Mezzadri	1	3
(Russia) A Chesnokov	1	6	6
16	(Sweden) H Holm	6	1	3

Third round
1	(United States) J Courier	6	6
Q	(Sweden) M Pernfors	0	3
18	(Australia) M Woodforde	6	6
(Russia) A Chesnokov	3	4

Fourth round
1	(United States) J Courier	3	6	2
18	(Australia) M Woodforde	6	2	6

==== Section 2 ====
First round
(Japan) S Matsuoka	4	2
(France) R Gilbert	6	6
(New Zealand) B Steven	6	6
(Germany) D Prinosil	3	2
(Argentina) G Markus	4	6	2
(Chile) S Cortés	6	2	6
(Spain) T Carbonell	3	7^{7}	2
(South Africa) M Ondruska	6	6^{4}	6

Second round
9	(Germany) M Stich	4	6	6
(France) R Gilbert	6	3	4
(New Zealand) B Steven	4	0^{r}
Q	(India) R Krishnan	6	1
25	(Sweden) M Larsson	6^{3}	2
(Chile) S Cortés	7^{7}	6
(South Africa) M Ondruska	7	6
7	(United States) M Chang	5	1

Third round
9	(Germany) M Stich	6	3	6
Q	(India) R Krishnan	3	6	4
(Chile) S Cortés	2	3
(South Africa) M Ondruska	6	6

Fourth round
9	(Germany) M Stich	6^{3}	3
(South Africa) M Ondruska	7^{7}	6

==== Section 3 ====
First round
(Australia) S Youl	2	4
(Italy) G Pozzi	6	6
Q	(Sweden) D Engel	6	6
WC	(United States) J Connors	3	3
(Brazil) L Mattar	1	6	2
Q	(South Africa) D Nainkin	6	4	6
(Italy) D Nargiso	6	6^{1}	4
(Italy) R Furlan	1	7^{7}	6

Second round
4	(Germany) B Becker	w/o
(Italy) G Pozzi
Q	(Sweden) D Engel	5	4
29	(Sweden) N Kulti	7	6
20	(France) F Santoro	6	6
Q	(South Africa) D Nainkin	3	3
(Italy) R Furlan	6	1	1
14	(United States) MV Washington	4	6	6

Third round
4	(Germany) B Becker
29	(Sweden) N Kulti	w/o
20	(France) F Santoro	6^{4}	3
14	(United States) MV Washington	7^{7}	6

Fourth round
29	(Sweden) N Kulti	5	6^{3}
14	(United States) MV Washington	7	7^{7}

==== Section 4 ====
First round
Q	(United States) K Thorne	6	6
(Netherlands) J Eltingh	2	3
Q	(Brazil) F Roese	5	2
(France) O Delaître	7	6
(United States) D Rostagno	3	4
(United States) B Shelton	6	6
(United States) P McEnroe	7^{8}	6
(Germany) P Kühnen	6^{6}	2

Second round
11	(South Africa) W Ferreira	1	1
Q	(United States) K Thorne	6	6
(France) O Delaître	4	4
21	(Switzerland) M Rosset	6	6
28	(Spain) F Clavet	7	3	4
(United States) B Shelton	5	6	6
(United States) P McEnroe	6	6
6	(Croatia) G Ivanišević	3	3

Third round
Q	(United States) K Thorne	3	2
21	(Switzerland) M Rosset	6	6
(United States) B Shelton	3	2
(United States) P McEnroe	6	6

Fourth round
21	(Switzerland) M Rosset	6	6^{2}	0
(United States) P McEnroe	4	7^{7}	6

=== Bottom half ===
==== Section 5 ====
First round
(United States) R Weiss	3	0
Q	(South Africa) G Stafford	6	6
(Mexico) L Herrera	4	6	2
(Germany) M Naewie	6	1	6
(Netherlands) J Siemerink	5	5
(France) G Raoux	7	7
(Italy) S Pescosolido	6	2	2
(Germany) K Braasch	3	6	6

Second round
5	(Czechoslovakia) P Korda	6	6
Q	(South Africa) G Stafford	4	1
(Germany) M Naewie	3	6^{4}
27	(Switzerland) J Hlasek	6	7^{7}
22	(Argentina) A Mancini	3	4
(France) G Raoux	6	6
(Germany) K Braasch	5	6	4
12	(Austria) T Muster	7	4	6

Third round
5	(Czechoslovakia) P Korda	6	6
27	(Switzerland) J Hlasek	2	2
(France) G Raoux	6	6
12	(Austria) T Muster	3	2

Fourth round
5	(Czechoslovakia) P Korda	6	6
(France) G Raoux	4	4

==== Section 6 ====
First round
(United States) T Witsken	7^{7}	4	6
(United States) J Stark	6^{5}	6	3
WC	(Ecuador) A Gómez	3	1
WC	(United States) V Spadea	6	6
LL	(Argentina) J Frana	7^{7}	7
(Australia) S Stolle	6^{5}	5
(South Africa) C van Rensburg	5	6	6^{3}
(Mexico) L Lavalle	7	2	7^{7}

Second round
13	(France) G Forget	6	7
(United States) T Witsken	3	5
WC	(United States) V Spadea	4	7^{7}	1
19	(France) A Boetsch	6	6^{5}	6
30	(Brazil) J Oncins	7	2	6^{6}
LL	(Argentina) J Frana	5	6	7^{8}
(Mexico) L Lavalle	4	3
3	(Sweden) S Edberg	6	6

Third round
13	(France) G Forget	7	6
19	(France) A Boetsch	5	2
LL	(Argentina) J Frana	6	3	3
3	(Sweden) S Edberg	4	6	6

Fourth round
13	(France) G Forget	2	4
3	(Sweden) S Edberg	6	6

==== Section 7 ====
First round
(United States) A Krickstein	4	6	5
(United States) A O'Brien	6	3	5^{r}
Q	(Australia) J Stoltenberg	6	7^{7}
(United States) D Wheaton	3	6^{3}
(United States) C Adams	7^{8}	3	6
Q	(United States) J Palmer	6^{6}	6	4
(Israel) G Bloom	6	6^{5}	6^{2}
(Germany) B Karbacher	3	7^{7}	7^{7}

Second round
8	(United States) A Agassi	7	6
(United States) A Krickstein	5	0
Q	(Australia) J Stoltenberg	6^{3}	6	6
26	(Spain) E Sánchez	7^{7}	4	3
24	(Germany) C-U Steeb	7	3	7
(United States) C Adams	5	6	5
(Germany) B Karbacher	5	6	3
10	(Netherlands) R Krajicek	7	3	6

Third round
8	(United States) A Agassi	6	6
Q	(Australia) J Stoltenberg	0	1
24	(Germany) C-U Steeb	3	3
10	(Netherlands) R Krajicek	6	6

Fourth round
8	(United States) A Agassi	2	5
10	(Netherlands) R Krajicek	6	7

==== Section 8 ====
First round
Q	(Spain) J Burillo	2	3
(Netherlands) P Haarhuis	6	6
(United States) J Grabb	7	6^{3}	5
Q	(United States) R Leach	5	7^{7}	7
(United States) J Tarango	2	6	6
(Sweden) T Enqvist	6	2	2
(Russia) A Olhovskiy	2	1
(United States) T Martin	6	6

Second round
15	(Russia) A Volkov	6	3	3
(Netherlands) P Haarhuis	4	6	6
Q	(United States) R Leach	6	1	1
17	(Ukraine) A Medvedev	4	6	6
32	(Russia) A Cherkasov	2	2
(United States) J Tarango	6	6
(United States) T Martin	3	4
2	(United States) P Sampras	6	6

Third round
(Netherlands) P Haarhuis	4	4
17	(Ukraine) A Medvedev	6	6
(United States) J Tarango	6^{4}	3
2	(United States) P Sampras	7^{7}	6

Fourth round
17	(Ukraine) A Medvedev	7^{7}	3	2
2	(United States) P Sampras	6^{5}	6	6

== Qualifying ==
=== Qualifying seeds ===
1. (Argentina) Javier Frana (qualifying competition, Lucky loser)
2. (United States) Jared Palmer (qualified)
3. (Colombia) Mauricio Hadad (first round)
4. (Brazil) Fernando Roese (qualified)
5. (Spain) Juan Gisbert Schultze (first round)
6. (Australia) Jason Stoltenberg (qualified)
7. (United States) Kenny Thorne (qualified)
8. (United States) Chris Garner (first round)
9. (Sweden) David Engel (qualified)
10. (Mexico) Oliver Fernández (qualifying competition)
11. (Canada) Greg Rusedski (first round)
12. (Spain) Jordi Burillo (qualified)
13. (France) Thierry Guardiola (first round)
14. (Italy) Cristiano Caratti (qualifying competition)
15. (United States) Dave Randall (first round)
16. (South Africa) Grant Stafford (qualified)
17. (United States) Jimmy Arias (qualifying competition)
18. (The Bahamas) Roger Smith (first round)
19. (Italy) Laurence Tieleman (second round)
20. (Sweden) Peter Lundgren (first round)
21. (Brazil) Fernando Meligeni (first round)
22. (Sweden) Nicklas Utgren (first round)
23. (France) Jean-Philippe Fleurian (first round)
24. (United States) Steve Bryan (second round)

=== Qualifiers ===
1. (United States) Rick Leach
2. (United States) Jared Palmer
3. (India) Ramesh Krishnan
4. (Brazil) Fernando Roese
5. (Sweden) Mikael Pernfors
6. (Australia) Jason Stoltenberg
7. (United States) Kenny Thorne
8. (Canada) Grant Connell
9. (Sweden) David Engel
10. (South Africa) Grant Stafford
11. (South Africa) David Nainkin
12. (Spain) Jordi Burillo

=== Lucky loser ===
1. (Argentina) Javier Frana

=== Qualifying draws ===
==== First qualifier ====
First round
1	(Argentina) Javier Frana	6	6
(United States) Donald Johnson	1	3
(Slovakia) Marián Vajda	6	6
(Puerto Rico) Miguel Nido	3	0
(United States) Rick Leach	6	6
WC	(United States) David Mildrexler	3	3
(Spain) Tati Rascón	3	0
24	(United States) Steve Bryan	6	6

Second round
1	(Argentina) Javier Frana	6	6
(Slovakia) Marián Vajda	0	3
(United States) Rick Leach	3	7	6
24	(United States) Steve Bryan	6	6	4

Qualifying competition
1	(Argentina) Javier Frana	6	2	3
(United States) Rick Leach	3	6	6

==== Second qualifier ====
First round
2	(United States) Jared Palmer	6	7
(Ukraine) Dimitri Poliakov	3	6
(Canada) Daniel Nestor	2	7	6
(Australia) Carl Limberger	6	5	3
(United States) David DiLucia	6	6
(Spain) Alejo Mancisidor	3	3
(Russia) Yevgeny Kafelnikov	2	6	6
23	(France) Jean-Philippe Fleurian	6	4	3

Second round
2	(United States) Jared Palmer	7	3	7
(Canada) Daniel Nestor	5	6	5
(United States) David DiLucia	6	6
(Russia) Yevgeny Kafelnikov	4	1

Qualifying competition
2	(United States) Jared Palmer	6	7
(United States) David DiLucia	0	6

==== Third qualifier ====
First round
3	(Colombia) Mauricio Hadad	6	2	4
(India) Ramesh Krishnan	2	6	6
(Canada) Martin Wostenholme	3	2
(South Africa) Robbie Koenig	6	6
WC	(Brazil) Otávio Della	1	4
(Italy) Claudio Rigagnoli	6	6
(United States) Scott Davis	6	6
21	(Brazil) Fernando Meligeni	3	3

Second round
(India) Ramesh Krishnan	6	7
(South Africa) Robbie Koenig	2	6
(Italy) Claudio Rigagnoli	3	4
(United States) Scott Davis	6	6

Qualifying competition
(India) Ramesh Krishnan	6	6
(United States) Scott Davis	2	2

==== Fourth qualifier ====
First round
4	(Brazil) Fernando Roese	6	6
WC	(United States) Mark Merklein	3	2
(United States) David Kass	7	4	1
(United States) Kent Kinnear	5	6	6
(Italy) Francesco Michelotti	6	6
(Sweden) Lars-Anders Wahlgren	3	4
(Australia) John Fitzgerald	6	1	6
22	(Sweden) Nicklas Utgren	1	6	1

Second round
4	(Brazil) Fernando Roese	6	3	6
(United States) Kent Kinnear	0	6	3
(Italy) Francesco Michelotti	3	2
(Australia) John Fitzgerald	6	6

Qualifying competition
4	(Brazil) Fernando Roese	3	6	6
(Australia) John Fitzgerald	6	2	3

==== Fifth qualifier ====
First round
5	(Spain) Juan Gisbert Schultze	2	2
(Sweden) Mikael Pernfors	6	6
(France) Lionel Roux	6	6
(South Africa) David Adams	3	2
(Venezuela) Maurice Ruah	6	6
(Brazil) José Daher	3	4
(Colombia) Mario Rincón	7	7
20	(Sweden) Peter Lundgren	6	6

Second round
(Sweden) Mikael Pernfors	6	6
(France) Lionel Roux	3	0
(Venezuela) Maurice Ruah	6	6
(Colombia) Mario Rincón	4	2

Qualifying competition
(Sweden) Mikael Pernfors	7	6
(Venezuela) Maurice Ruah	5	3

==== Sixth qualifier ====
First round
6	(Australia) Jason Stoltenberg	6	6
(Ecuador) Pablo Campana	2	3
(France) Tarik Benhabiles	6	6
(Brazil) William Kyriakos	2	4
(United States) Todd Nelson	6	6
(United States) Louis Gloria	3	3
(South Africa) Marius Barnard	6	3
19	(Italy) Laurence Tieleman	7	6

Second round
6	(Australia) Jason Stoltenberg	6	6
(France) Tarik Benhabiles	3	2
(United States) Todd Nelson	7	1	6
19	(Italy) Laurence Tieleman	5	6	3

Qualifying competition
6	(Australia) Jason Stoltenberg	6	6
(United States) Todd Nelson	0	4

==== Seventh qualifier ====
First round
7	(United States) Kenny Thorne	6	6
WC	(Germany) Markus Rackl	2	2
(United States) Richard Schmidt	6	6	6
(United States) David Witt	3	7	4
(Argentina) Pablo Albano	4	6
(The Bahamas) Mark Knowles	6	7
(Spain) Juan Albert Viloca	7	5	6
17	(United States) Jimmy Arias	5	7	7

Second round
7	(United States) Kenny Thorne	6	6
(United States) Richard Schmidt	3	3
(The Bahamas) Mark Knowles	2	5
17	(United States) Jimmy Arias	6	7

Qualifying competition
7	(United States) Kenny Thorne	6	3	6
17	(United States) Jimmy Arias	3	6	3

==== Eighth qualifier ====
First round
8	(United States) Chris Garner	6	3	3
(South Africa) Ellis Ferreira	4	6	6
(Colombia) Miguel Tobón	4	2
(United States) Keith Evans	6	6
(Netherlands) Tom Nijssen	4	6	6
(Canada) Grant Connell	6	4	7
(Canada) Sébastien Lareau	7	6
18	(The Bahamas) Roger Smith	6	2

Second round
(South Africa) Ellis Ferreira	6	7
(United States) Keith Evans	4	6
(Canada) Grant Connell	6	4	6
(Canada) Sébastien Lareau	3	6	1

Qualifying competition
(South Africa) Ellis Ferreira	6	1	2
(Canada) Grant Connell	4	6	6

==== Ninth qualifier ====
First round
9	(Sweden) David Engel	3	7	7
(United States) Brian Joelson	6	6	5
(Sweden) Johan Donar	7	6
(Mexico) Agustín Moreno	6	2
(Brazil) Nelson Aerts	1	4
(France) Laurent Prades	6	6
(United States) Michael Joyce	6	2	7
15	(United States) Dave Randall	4	6	6

Second round
9	(Sweden) David Engel	6	3	6
(Sweden) Johan Donar	4	6	4
(France) Laurent Prades	6	2	1
(United States) Michael Joyce	4	6	6

Qualifying competition
9	(Sweden) David Engel	6	6
(United States) Michael Joyce	4	4

==== Tenth qualifier ====
First round
10	(Mexico) Oliver Fernández	3	6	6
(Spain) David de Miguel	6	2	4
(Germany) Markus Zillner	3	1
(Chile) Felipe Rivera	6	6
(United States) Doug Flach	4	6	3
(Australia) Patrick Rafter	6	3	6
WC	(United States) Dick Bosse	6	5	4
16	(South Africa) Grant Stafford	3	7	6

Second round
10	(Mexico) Oliver Fernández	6	6
(Chile) Felipe Rivera	2	2
(Australia) Patrick Rafter	5	4
16	(South Africa) Grant Stafford	7	6

Qualifying competition
10	(Mexico) Oliver Fernández	4	1
16	(South Africa) Grant Stafford	6	6

==== Eleventh qualifier ====
First round
11	(Canada) Greg Rusedski	2	7	3
(South Africa) David Nainkin	6	6	6
(Argentina) Roberto Saad	2	2
(United States) Brian Devening	6	6
(Israel) Oren Motevassel	6	4
WC	(United States) Donny Isaak	7	6
WC	(Canada) Glenn Michibata	6	5	6
13	(France) Thierry Guardiola	3	7	3

Second round
(South Africa) David Nainkin	5	6	6
(United States) Brian Devening	7	4	1
WC	(United States) Donny Isaak	1	6	4
WC	(Canada) Glenn Michibata	6	4	6

Qualifying competition
(South Africa) David Nainkin	6	6
WC	(Canada) Glenn Michibata	2	4

==== Twelfth qualifier ====
First round
12	(Spain) Jordi Burillo	6	6
(United States) Brian Dunn	2	2
(United States) Kelly Jones	6	5	4
(Spain) Javier Molina	1	7	6
(Japan) Yasufumi Yamamoto	4	4
(Brazil) Cássio Motta	6	6
(Canada) Albert Chang	5	4
14	(Italy) Cristiano Caratti	7	6

Second round
12	(Spain) Jordi Burillo	6	6
(Spain) Javier Molina	0	4
(Brazil) Cássio Motta	4	4
14	(Italy) Cristiano Caratti	6	6

Qualifying competition
12	(Spain) Jordi Burillo	6	6	7
14	(Italy) Cristiano Caratti	3	7	5
