= 1993 US Open – Men's singles qualifying =

Men's singles qualifying
- 1993 US Open

Events
Singles	men	women		boys	girls
Doubles	men	women	mixed	boys	girls
WC Singles	men	women	quad
WC Doubles	men	women	quad
Legends	men	women	mixed

Qualification
Singles	men	women
- US Open

Players who neither had high enough rankings nor received wild cards to enter the main draw of the annual US Open Tennis Championships participated in a qualifying tournament held over several days before the event.

== Seeds ==
1. (Australia) Pat Rafter (qualifying competition, lucky loser)
2. (Italy) Stefano Pescosolido (first round)
3. (United States) Robbie Weiss (qualified)
4. (United Kingdom) Chris Wilkinson (first round)
5. (Italy) Cristiano Caratti (qualified)
6. (Canada) Chris Pridham (first round)
7. (France) Jean-Philippe Fleurian (qualified)
8. (United States) Steve Bryan (qualifying competition)
9. (Italy) Diego Nargiso (qualifying competition)
10. (United Kingdom) Jeremy Bates (second round)
11. (Italy) Laurence Tieleman (first round)
12. (Japan) Shuzo Matsuoka (qualified)
13. (Australia) Neil Borwick (qualified)
14. (United States) Richard Matuszewski (first round)
15. (Canada) Andrew Sznajder (qualifying competition)
16. (Israel) Gilad Bloom (first round)
17. (South Africa) David Nainkin (qualified)
18. (Venezuela) Maurice Ruah (second round)
19. (The Bahamas) Mark Knowles (qualifying competition)
20. (United States) Chris Garner (qualifying competition)
21. (United States) Kelly Jones (first round)
22. (United States) Dave Randall (second round)
23. (Ukraine) Dimitri Poliakov (qualified)
24. (United States) Jimmy Arias (first round)
25. (France) Lionel Roux (qualifying competition)
26. (Australia) Sandon Stolle (first round)
27. (Canada) Sébastien Lareau (second round)
28. (United Kingdom) Chris Bailey (qualifying competition)
29. (South Africa) Kevin Ullyett (qualified)
30. (The Bahamas) Roger Smith (qualifying competition)
31. (Brazil) Roberto Jabali (first round)
32. (India) Leander Paes (second round)

== Qualifiers ==
1. (United States) Bret Garnett
2. (South Africa) Lan Bale
3. (United States) Robbie Weiss
4. (South Africa) Kevin Ullyett
5. (Italy) Cristiano Caratti
6. (United States) Ivan Baron
7. (France) Jean-Philippe Fleurian
8. (United States) Michael Joyce
9. (Ukraine) Dimitri Poliakov
10. (Norway) Bent-Ove Pedersen
11. (Canada) Daniel Nestor
12. (Japan) Shuzo Matsuoka
13. (Australia) Neil Borwick
14. (United States) Phil Williamson
15. (South Africa) David Nainkin
16. (Australia) Michael Tebbutt

== Lucky losers ==
1. (Australia) Pat Rafter

== Qualifying draw ==
Key

- Q = Qualifier
- WC = Wild card
- LL = Lucky loser
- Alt = Alternate
- ITF = ITF entry
- PR = Protected ranking
- SR = Special ranking
- SE = Special exempt
- JE = Junior exempt
- JR = Junior Accelerator Programme entrant
- CO = College Accelerator Programme entrant
- NG = Next Gen Accelerator Program entrant
- w/o = Walkover
- r = Retired
- d = Defaulted

=== First qualifier ===
First round
1	(Australia) Pat Rafter	6	6
(Philippines) Roland So	4	1
(United States) Louis Gloria	6	3	4
(Spain) Juan Ignacio Carrasco	4	6	6
(United States) David Blair	6	4
(United States) Bret Garnett	7	6
(Sweden) Niclas Kroon	6	7
31	(Brazil) Roberto Jabali	0	6

Second round
1	(Australia) Pat Rafter	6	6
(Spain) Juan Ignacio Carrasco	2	3
(United States) Bret Garnett	6	3	7
(Sweden) Niclas Kroon	2	6	5

Qualifying competition
1	(Australia) Pat Rafter	6	6
(United States) Bret Garnett	7	7

=== Second qualifier ===
First round
2	(Italy) Stefano Pescosolido	4	4
(Brazil) Danilo Marcelino	6	6
(United States) Donny Isaak	3	0
(South Africa) Lan Bale	6	6
(United Kingdom) Ross Matheson	3	3
(United States) Martin Blackman	6	6
(United States) Brian Dunn	3	5
32	(India) Leander Paes	6	7

Second round
(Brazil) Danilo Marcelino	4	6
(South Africa) Lan Bale	6	7
(United States) Martin Blackman	6	6	6
32	(India) Leander Paes	7	2	3

Qualifying competition
(South Africa) Lan Bale	6	3	6
(United States) Martin Blackman	3	6	3

=== Third qualifier ===
First round
3	(United States) Robbie Weiss	6	6
(Australia) Wayne Arthurs	4	4
(United States) Brian Joelson	7	6	6
(Spain) Sergio Gómez Barrio	6	7	1
(New Zealand) Kelly Evernden	4	2
(United States) Michael Zimmerman	6	6
(Australia) Heath Denman	2	1^{r}
30	(The Bahamas) Roger Smith	6	2

Second round
3	(United States) Robbie Weiss	6	6
(United States) Brian Joelson	3	2
(United States) Michael Zimmerman	2	3
30	(The Bahamas) Roger Smith	6	6

Qualifying competition
3	(United States) Robbie Weiss	6	6
30	(The Bahamas) Roger Smith	3	2

=== Fourth qualifier ===
First round
4	(United Kingdom) Chris Wilkinson	6	5
(Colombia) Mario Rincón	7	7
WC	(United States) Tad Berkowitz	6	6
(United States) Todd Nelson	4	3
(Australia) Grant Doyle	7	6
WC	(United States) John Roddick	6	3
(Italy) Pietro Pennisi	1	2
29	(South Africa) Kevin Ullyett	6	6

Second round
(Colombia) Mario Rincón	6	6
WC	(United States) Tad Berkowitz	4	2
(Australia) Grant Doyle	5	3
29	(South Africa) Kevin Ullyett	7	6

Qualifying competition
(Colombia) Mario Rincón	6	5	1
29	(South Africa) Kevin Ullyett	2	7	6

=== Fifth qualifier ===
First round
5	(Italy) Cristiano Caratti	6	6
(United States) Matt Lucena	3	1
WC	(United States) Scott Humphries	2	4
(United States) Buff Farrow	6	6
(Argentina) Gastón Etlis	2	1
(Netherlands) Joost Winnink	6	6
(Japan) Hideki Kaneko	6	4
28	(United Kingdom) Chris Bailey	7	6

Second round
5	(Italy) Cristiano Caratti	6	6
(United States) Buff Farrow	4	2
(Netherlands) Joost Winnink	6	3	5
28	(United Kingdom) Chris Bailey	4	6	7

Qualifying competition
5	(Italy) Cristiano Caratti	6	6	6
28	(United Kingdom) Chris Bailey	7	3	4

=== Sixth qualifier ===
First round
6	(Canada) Chris Pridham	6	1	0
(Sweden) Thomas Högstedt	3	6	6
WC	(United States) Geoff Grant	3	2
(Italy) Francesco Michelotti	6	6
(United States) Ivan Baron	6	6
(United States) Martin Barba	2	3
(Sweden) Johan Carlsson	7	2	2
27	(Canada) Sébastien Lareau	6	6	6

Second round
(Sweden) Thomas Högstedt	1	6
(Italy) Francesco Michelotti	6	7
(United States) Ivan Baron	6	3	6
27	(Canada) Sébastien Lareau	4	6	4

Qualifying competition
(Italy) Francesco Michelotti	4	2
(United States) Ivan Baron	6	6

=== Seventh qualifier ===
First round
7	(France) Jean-Philippe Fleurian	6	6
(Israel) Michael Daniel	4	0
(Canada) Martin Laurendeau	5	4
(Sweden) Peter Lundgren	7	6
(United States) Brian Devening	6	6
(United Kingdom) Mark Petchey	3	2
WC	(United States) Steve Campbell	2	6
25	(France) Lionel Roux	6	7

Second round
7	(France) Jean-Philippe Fleurian	6	7
(Sweden) Peter Lundgren	4	6
(United States) Brian Devening	6	6
25	(France) Lionel Roux	7	7

Qualifying competition
7	(France) Jean-Philippe Fleurian	5	6	6
25	(France) Lionel Roux	7	3	0

=== Eighth qualifier ===
First round
8	(United States) Steve Bryan	7	6
(Mexico) Agustín Moreno	6	2
(Japan) Yasufumi Yamamoto	7	5	3
WC	(United States) Ty Tucker	6	7	6
WC	(United States) Dan Coakley	2	3
(United States) Michael Joyce	6	6
(United States) George Bezecny	6	6	6
26	(Australia) Sandon Stolle	7	1	2

Second round
8	(United States) Steve Bryan	7	6
WC	(United States) Ty Tucker	6	2
(United States) Michael Joyce	6	6
(United States) George Bezecny	2	2

Qualifying competition
8	(United States) Steve Bryan	6	6	3
(United States) Michael Joyce	7	2	6

=== Ninth qualifier ===
First round
9	(Italy) Diego Nargiso	6	6
(Canada) Brian Gyetko	3	3
(Canada) Grant Connell	6	4	2
WC	(United States) Wade McGuire	3	6	6
(Romania) Dinu Pescariu	6	6
(South Africa) Clinton Marsh	3	4
(United States) Tony Bujan	3	1
23	(Ukraine) Dimitri Poliakov	6	6

Second round
9	(Italy) Diego Nargiso	6	6
WC	(United States) Wade McGuire	4	4
(Romania) Dinu Pescariu	3	6
23	(Ukraine) Dimitri Poliakov	6	7

Qualifying competition
9	(Italy) Diego Nargiso	2	2
23	(Ukraine) Dimitri Poliakov	6	6

=== Tenth qualifier ===
First round
10	(United Kingdom) Jeremy Bates	6	6
WC	(United States) Justin Gimelstob	2	2
(South Africa) Marius Barnard	2	6	2
(Norway) Bent-Ove Pedersen	6	1	6
(Canada) Albert Chang	4	6	6
(South Africa) David Adams	6	4	4
(Australia) Paul Kilderry	2	6	7
24	(United States) Jimmy Arias	6	3	5

Second round
10	(United Kingdom) Jeremy Bates	6	4	4
(Norway) Bent-Ove Pedersen	2	6	6
(Canada) Albert Chang	1	6
(Australia) Paul Kilderry	6	7

Qualifying competition
(Norway) Bent-Ove Pedersen	7	6
(Australia) Paul Kilderry	5	4

=== Eleventh qualifier ===
First round
11	(Italy) Laurence Tieleman	4	7	6
(United States) Keith Evans	6	6	7
(United States) Kent Kinnear	6	6
(Federal Republic of Yugoslavia) Goran Mihajlović	3	3
(Japan) Ryuso Tsujino	5	6	6
(France) Philippe Pech	7	0	3
(Canada) Daniel Nestor	6	6
21	(United States) Kelly Jones	3	4

Second round
(United States) Keith Evans	6	6
(United States) Kent Kinnear	2	2
(Japan) Ryuso Tsujino	5	6
(Canada) Daniel Nestor	7	7

Qualifying competition
(United States) Keith Evans	3	4
(Canada) Daniel Nestor	6	6

=== Twelfth qualifier ===
First round
12	(Japan) Shuzo Matsuoka	6	7
(South Africa) Neville Godwin	1	5
(Sweden) Mårten Renström	6	6
(Australia) Stephen Gleeson	1	2
(United Kingdom) Miles Maclagan	4	4
(United States) Richard Schmidt	6	6
(Israel) Ofer Sela	3	6
22	(United States) Dave Randall	6	7

Second round
12	(Japan) Shuzo Matsuoka	6	6
(Sweden) Mårten Renström	3	2
(United States) Richard Schmidt	7	6
22	(United States) Dave Randall	5	2

Qualifying competition
12	(Japan) Shuzo Matsuoka	6	3	7
(United States) Richard Schmidt	4	6	6

=== Thirteenth qualifier ===
First round
13	(Australia) Neil Borwick	4	7	7
(Peru) José Luis Noriega	6	6	6
(United States) Mashiska Washington	1	4
(United States) Ryan Blake	6	6
(Sweden) Peter Nyborg	6	6
(Haiti) Bertrand Madsen	2	4
(United States) Brian MacPhie	4	5
20	(United States) Chris Garner	6	7

Second round
13	(Australia) Neil Borwick	7	7
(United States) Ryan Blake	6	6
(Sweden) Peter Nyborg	4	7	3
20	(United States) Chris Garner	6	6	6

Qualifying competition
13	(Australia) Neil Borwick	6	6
20	(United States) Chris Garner	4	4

=== Fourteenth qualifier ===
First round
14	(United States) Richard Matuszewski	4	3
(United States) Phil Williamson	6	6
(Italy) Nicola Bruno	4	0^{r}
(United States) Michael Shyjan	6	3
(Belgium) Fabien Cousin	5	6	3
(United States) Marco Cacopardo	7	4	6
(South Africa) Gary Muller	3	3
19	(The Bahamas) Mark Knowles	6	6

Second round
(United States) Phil Williamson	6	6
(United States) Michael Shyjan	2	2
(United States) Marco Cacopardo	5	2
19	(The Bahamas) Mark Knowles	7	6

Qualifying competition
(United States) Phil Williamson	3	6	3
19	(The Bahamas) Mark Knowles	6	3	0^{r}

=== Fifteenth qualifier ===
First round
15	(Canada) Andrew Sznajder	6	3	6
(United States) Mark Merklein	2	6	1
(South Africa) Mark Kaplan	2	6	2
(Sweden) David Engel	6	3	6
(France) Stéphane Sansoni	2	3
(Spain) Juan-Albert Viloca-Puig	6	6
(Israel) Oren Motevassel	0	3
17	(South Africa) David Nainkin	6	6

Second round
15	(Canada) Andrew Sznajder	6	6
(Sweden) David Engel	2	3
(Spain) Juan-Albert Viloca-Puig	4	7	2
17	(South Africa) David Nainkin	6	5	6

Qualifying competition
15	(Canada) Andrew Sznajder	6	3
17	(South Africa) David Nainkin	7	6

=== Sixteenth qualifier ===
First round
16	(Israel) Gilad Bloom	3	5
(Chile) Felipe Rivera	6	7
(United States) David Kass	3	1
(Australia) Michael Tebbutt	6	6
(Brazil) Fabio Silberberg	5	1
(India) Ramesh Krishnan	7	6
(Italy) Vincenzo Santopadre	5	0
18	(Venezuela) Maurice Ruah	7	6

Second round
(Chile) Felipe Rivera	3	5
(Australia) Michael Tebbutt	6	7
(India) Ramesh Krishnan	6	7
18	(Venezuela) Maurice Ruah	3	6

Qualifying competition
(Australia) Michael Tebbutt	7	6	6
(India) Ramesh Krishnan	5	7	4
