= 1994 Wimbledon Championships – Men's singles qualifying =

Men's singles qualifying
- 1994 Wimbledon Championships

Events
Singles	men	women		boys	girls
Doubles	men	women	mixed	boys	girls
WC Singles	men	women	quad
WC Doubles	men	women	quad
Legends	men	women	seniors

Qualification
Singles	men	women
Doubles	men	women
- Wimbledon Championships

Players and pairs who neither have high enough rankings nor receive wild cards may participate in a qualifying tournament held one week before the annual Wimbledon Tennis Championships.

== Seeds ==
1. (United States) Bryan Shelton (qualified)
2. (Ukraine) Dimitri Poliakov (first round)
3. (Germany) Alexander Mronz (qualified)
4. (United States) Doug Flach (qualifying competition, lucky loser)
5. (Canada) Sébastien Lareau (qualified)
6. (Australia) Brent Larkham (first round)
7. (Australia) Sandon Stolle (first round)
8. (Canada) Daniel Nestor (first round)
9. (Australia) Michael Tebbutt (qualified)
10. (Australia) Simon Youl (qualified)
11. (Australia) Neil Borwick (qualifying competition)
12. (South Africa) Kevin Ullyett (second round)
13. (United States) Michael Joyce (first round)
14. (United States) Jonathan Canter (qualified)
15. (United States) Martin Blackman (first round)
16. (South Africa) Mark Kaplan (second round)
17. (Germany) Arne Thoms (qualified)
18. (Australia) Todd Woodbridge (first round)
19. (United States) Vince Spadea (second round)
20. (South Africa) David Nainkin (qualifying competition)
21. (The Bahamas) Mark Knowles (qualified)
22. (Netherlands) Fernon Wibier (first round)
23. (India) Leander Paes (qualifying competition)
24. (Kenya) Paul Wekesa (second round)
25. (Australia) Peter Tramacchi (second round)
26. (Canada) Albert Chang (second round)
27. (Spain) Emilio Benfele Álvarez (first round)
28. (Australia) Paul Kilderry (first round)
29. (United States) David Witt (qualified)
30. (France) Lionel Barthez (qualifying competition)
31. (The Bahamas) Roger Smith (tennis) (first round)
32. (Germany) Lars Rehmann (second round)

== Qualifiers ==
1. (United States) Bryan Shelton
2. (Spain) José Francisco Altur
3. (Germany) Alexander Mronz
4. (United States) David Witt
5. (Canada) Sébastien Lareau
6. (Canada) Grant Connell
7. (Germany) Christian Saceanu
8. (South Africa) Ellis Ferreira
9. (Australia) Michael Tebbutt
10. (Australia) Simon Youl
11. (United States) Kenny Thorne
12. (The Bahamas) Mark Knowles
13. (Australia) John Fitzgerald
14. (United States) Jonathan Canter
15. (Italy) Laurence Tieleman
16. (Germany) Arne Thoms

== Lucky loser ==
1. (United States) Doug Flach

== Qualifying draw ==
=== First qualifier ===
First round
1	(United States) Bryan Shelton	6	6
(United States) Dave Randall	1	2
(Netherlands) Tom Kempers	7	6
WC	(United Kingdom) Luke Milligan	5	1
(United States) Wade McGuire	6	6	9
(Israel) Ofer Sela	3	7	7
(Sweden) Thomas Högstedt	4	1
32	(Germany) Lars Rehmann	6	6

Second round
1	(United States) Bryan Shelton	4	6	8
(Netherlands) Tom Kempers	6	4	6
(United States) Wade McGuire	6	7
32	(Germany) Lars Rehmann	2	6

Qualifying competition
1	(United States) Bryan Shelton	6	7^{7}	6
(United States) Wade McGuire	3	6^{4}	1

=== Second qualifier ===
First round
2	(Ukraine) Dimitri Poliakov	2	6	1
(Netherlands) Joost Winnink	6	3	6
(United States) Louis Gloria	6	6
(Belgium) Fabien Cousin	3	4
(United States) Bill Barber	6	4	6
(Hungary) József Krocskó	4	6	2
(Spain) José Francisco Altur	7	5	6
31	(The Bahamas) Roger Smith	6	7	4

Second round
(Netherlands) Joost Winnink	6	2
(United States) Louis Gloria	7	6
(United States) Bill Barber	6	4	3
(Spain) José Francisco Altur	3	6	6

Qualifying competition
(United States) Louis Gloria	4	7^{7}	5	3
(Spain) José Francisco Altur	6	6^{3}	7	6

=== Third qualifier ===
First round
3	(Germany) Alexander Mronz	6	7
(Sweden) Lars-Anders Wahlgren	3	6
(South Africa) Marius Barnard	4	7	6
WC	(United Kingdom) Paul Hand	6	6	3
(France) Aloïs Beust	2	2
(Netherlands) Tom Nijssen	6	6
(Germany) Martin Sinner	5	5
30	(France) Lionel Barthez	7	7

Second round
3	(Germany) Alexander Mronz	6	6
(South Africa) Marius Barnard	3	4
(Netherlands) Tom Nijssen	4	6	3
30	(France) Lionel Barthez	6	3	6

Qualifying competition
3	(Germany) Alexander Mronz	7^{8}	6	6
30	(France) Lionel Barthez	6^{6}	0	0

=== Fourth qualifier ===
First round
4	(United States) Doug Flach	7	7
(Netherlands) Stephen Noteboom	6	6
(Switzerland) Lorenzo Manta	7	6
(Colombia) Miguel Tobón	6	3
(United States) Matt Lucena	6	6
(Spain) Víctor López Morón	0	0
(United Kingdom) Danny Sapsford	2	6	4
29	(United States) David Witt	6	4	6

Second round
4	(United States) Doug Flach	6	6
(Switzerland) Lorenzo Manta	3	3
(United States) Matt Lucena	3	3
29	(United States) David Witt	6	6

Qualifying competition
4	(United States) Doug Flach	1	4	6^{4}
29	(United States) David Witt	6	6	7^{7}

=== Fifth qualifier ===
First round
5	(Canada) Sébastien Lareau	6	6
(France) Stéphane Huet	4	2
(United Kingdom) Colin Beecher	6	6
(Argentina) Sebastian Pacheco	3	3
WC	(United Kingdom) Gregg Saffery	6	7
(Spain) Gonzalo López-Fabero	2	6
(Australia) Mark Philippoussis	3	6	6
(Australia) Paul Kilderry	6	3	3

Second round
5	(Canada) Sébastien Lareau	7	6
(United Kingdom) Colin Beecher	5	2
WC	(United Kingdom) Gregg Saffery	5	3
(Australia) Mark Philippoussis	7	6

Qualifying competition
5	(Canada) Sébastien Lareau	6	6	6^{5}	7^{7}
(Australia) Mark Philippoussis	4	4	7^{7}	6^{2}

=== Sixth qualifier ===
First round
6	(Australia) Brent Larkham	4	6	9
WC	(United Kingdom) Michael Wyeth	6	3	11
WC	(Canada) Grant Connell	6	6
(Australia) Joshua Eagle	2	2
(Denmark) Morten Christensen	7	7
(Canada) Brian Gyetko	6	6
(Brazil) Danilo Marcelino	6	6
27	(Spain) Emilio Benfele Álvarez	3	2

Second round
WC	(United Kingdom) Michael Wyeth	7	4	1
WC	(Canada) Grant Connell	6	6	6
(Denmark) Morten Christensen	6	6
(Brazil) Danilo Marcelino	4	4

Qualifying competition
WC	(Canada) Grant Connell	7^{7}	7^{11}	6
(Denmark) Morten Christensen	6^{4}	6^{9}	4

=== Seventh qualifier ===
First round
7	(Australia) Sandon Stolle	6	4	8
(Spain) Álex López Morón	1	6	10
WC	(United Kingdom) Jamie Delgado	2	2
(Romania) Adrian Voinea	6	6
WC	(Germany) Christian Saceanu	6	7
(United States) Kent Kinnear	1	6
(United States) David Hall	5	0^{r}
26	(Canada) Albert Chang	7	0

Second round
(Spain) Álex López Morón	4	6	14
(Romania) Adrian Voinea	6	2	16
WC	(Germany) Christian Saceanu	6	6
26	(Canada) Albert Chang	2	1

Qualifying competition
(Romania) Adrian Voinea	3	3	2
WC	(Germany) Christian Saceanu	6	6	6

=== Eighth qualifier ===
First round
8	(Canada) Daniel Nestor	2	7	4
(United States) Todd Nelson	6	6	6
(Australia) Wayne Arthurs	3	5
(Sweden) Peter Lundgren	6	7
(Spain) Sergio Gómez Barrio	3	2
(South Africa) Ellis Ferreira	6	6
(Egypt) Tamer El-Sawy	5	6
25	(Australia) Peter Tramacchi	7	7

Second round
(United States) Todd Nelson	4	4
(Sweden) Peter Lundgren	6	6
(South Africa) Ellis Ferreira	7	6
25	(Australia) Peter Tramacchi	6	3

Qualifying competition
(Sweden) Peter Lundgren	2	6^{3}	3
(South Africa) Ellis Ferreira	6	7^{7}	6

=== Ninth qualifier ===
First round
9	(Australia) Michael Tebbutt	6	4	11
(Australia) Ben Ellwood	1	6	9
(Spain) Albert Portas	6	7
(South Africa) Clinton Marsh	3	5
(France) Philippe Pech	6	6
(Australia) Andrew Ilie	4	4
(Ecuador) Pablo Campana	4	3
24	(Kenya) Paul Wekesa	6	6

Second round
9	(Australia) Michael Tebbutt	6	6
(Spain) Albert Portas	2	1
(France) Philippe Pech	6	7
24	(Kenya) Paul Wekesa	3	5

Qualifying competition
9	(Australia) Michael Tebbutt	6	7	6
(France) Philippe Pech	4	5	2

=== Tenth qualifier ===
First round
10	(Australia) Simon Youl	6	7	6
(United States) Brian Devening	7	6	3
(Senegal) Yahiya Doumbia	2	6
(United States) Brian MacPhie	6	7
(United States) Keith Evans	3	6	6
(Argentina) Pablo Escribano	6	4	0
(United States) Alexis Hombrecher	6	3	4
23	(India) Leander Paes	3	6	6

Second round
10	(Australia) Simon Youl	6	7
(United States) Brian MacPhie	2	6
(United States) Keith Evans	4	1
23	(India) Leander Paes	6	6

Qualifying competition
10	(Australia) Simon Youl	6	6^{2}	7^{8}	6
23	(India) Leander Paes	4	7^{7}	6^{6}	2

=== Eleventh qualifier ===
First round
11	(Australia) Neil Borwick	4	7	6
(South Africa) Neville Godwin	6	6	1
(United Kingdom) Gary Henderson	7	6
(United States) Michael Zimmerman	6	4
(United States) Kenny Thorne	6	5	7
(Sweden) Nicklas Utgren	1	7	5
(Germany) Michael Geserer	7	6
22	(Netherlands) Fernon Wibier	6	3

Second round
11	(Australia) Neil Borwick	6	6
(United Kingdom) Gary Henderson	4	3
(United States) Kenny Thorne	6	3	6
(Germany) Michael Geserer	1	6	3

Qualifying competition
11	(Australia) Neil Borwick	6^{8}	4	4
(United States) Kenny Thorne	7^{10}	6	6

=== Twelfth qualifier ===
First round
12	(South Africa) Kevin Ullyett	4	6	6
(Mexico) Ignacio Martínez	6	1	4
(Sweden) David Engel	4	5
(United States) Grant Doyle	6	7
(Ecuador) Nicolás Lapentti	6	4
(United States) Francisco Montana	7	6
(Nigeria) Sule Ladipo	6	4
21	(The Bahamas) Mark Knowles	7	6

Second round
12	(South Africa) Kevin Ullyett	6	4	3
(United States) Grant Doyle	3	6	6
(United States) Francisco Montana	2	4
21	(The Bahamas) Mark Knowles	6	6

Qualifying competition
(United States) Grant Doyle	6^{9}	6	3	4
21	(The Bahamas) Mark Knowles	7^{11}	3	6	6

=== Thirteen qualifier ===
First round
13	(United States) Michael Joyce	6	3	2
WC	(Australia) John Fitzgerald	2	6	6
(United States) Michael Roberts	6	3	4
(Mexico) Rafael Rangel	3	6	6
(United States) Alex Reichel	4	6	4
WC	(United Kingdom) Andrew Richardson	6	3	6
(Sweden) Mikael Stadling	3	4
20	(South Africa) David Nainkin	6	6

Second round
WC	(Australia) John Fitzgerald	6	6
(Mexico) Rafael Rangel	1	2
WC	(United Kingdom) Andrew Richardson	6	3	4
20	(South Africa) David Nainkin	3	6	6

Qualifying competition
WC	(Australia) John Fitzgerald	6	3	5	6	6
(South Africa) David Nainkin	4	6	7	1	3

=== Fourteenth qualifier ===
First round
14	(United States) Jonathan Canter	6	6
(Japan) Daiji Morii	3	2
(Germany) Burkhard Scholz	6	6
(France) Bertrand Lemercier	4	2
(France) Stéphane Sansoni	5	6
(Ecuador) Andrés Alarcón	7	7
(South Africa) Lan Bale	4	3
19	(United States) Vince Spadea	6	6

Second round
14	(United States) Jonathan Canter	7	6
(Germany) Burkhard Scholz	6	5
(Ecuador) Andrés Alarcón	7	6
19	(United States) Vince Spadea	5	4

Qualifying competition
14	(United States) Jonathan Canter	7	6	5	7^{7}
(Ecuador) Andrés Alarcón	5	2	7	6^{1}

=== Fifteenth qualifier ===
First round
15	(United States) Martin Blackman	6	6	4
(Venezuela) Jimy Szymanski	4	7	6
(Japan) Ryuso Tsujino	4	7	2
(Sweden) Peter Nyborg	6	6	0^{r}
(United States) Bill Behrens	6	7
(Netherlands) Sjeng Schalken	3	5
(Italy) Laurence Tieleman	6	6
18	(Australia) Todd Woodbridge	4	2

Second round
(Venezuela) Jimy Szymanski	5	7	7
(Japan) Ryuso Tsujino	7	6	5
(United States) Bill Behrens	3	7	4
(Italy) Laurence Tieleman	6	6	6

Qualifying competition
(Venezuela) Jimy Szymanski	6^{0}	3	4
(Italy) Laurence Tieleman	7^{7}	6	6

=== Sixteenth qualifier ===
First round
16	(South Africa) Mark Kaplan	6	4	6
(United States) John Sullivan	1	6	1
(United States) Scott Sigerseth	6	7
(Romania) Andrei Pavel	4	6
(Italy) Claudio Pistolesi	6	6
(Spain) Pepe Imaz	4	4
(United Kingdom) Ross Matheson	6	6
17	(Germany) Arne Thoms	7	7

Second round
16	(South Africa) Mark Kaplan	3	5
(United States) Scott Sigerseth	6	7
(Italy) Claudio Pistolesi	6	3
17	(Germany) Arne Thoms	7	6

Qualifying competition
(United States) Scott Sigerseth	4	3	1
17	(Germany) Arne Thoms	6	6	6
