= 1994 Wimbledon Championships – Men's doubles qualifying =

Men's doubles qualifying
- 1994 Wimbledon Championships

Events
Singles	men	women		boys	girls
Doubles	men	women	mixed	boys	girls
WC Singles	men	women	quad
WC Doubles	men	women	quad
Legends	men	women	seniors

Qualification
Singles	men	women
Doubles	men	women
- Wimbledon Championships

Players and pairs who neither have high enough rankings nor receive wild cards may participate in a qualifying tournament held one week before the annual Wimbledon Tennis Championships.

== Seeds ==
1. (United States) Kelly Jones / (United States) Kenny Thorne (first round)
2. (Australia) Joshua Eagle / (Germany) Lars Rehmann (qualified)
3. (Sweden) Nicklas Utgren / (Sweden) Lars-Anders Wahlgren (second round)
4. (United Kingdom) Neil Broad / (United States) Matt Lucena (first round)
5. (Australia) Grant Doyle / (Australia) Paul Kilderry (qualified)
6. (Netherlands) Tom Kempers / (Australia) Michael Tebbutt (qualifying competition, lucky losers)

== Qualifiers ==
1. (Australia) Grant Doyle / (Australia) Paul Kilderry
2. (Australia) Joshua Eagle / (Germany) Lars Rehmann
3. (Netherlands) Stephen Noteboom / (Netherlands) Fernon Wibier

== Lucky losers ==
1. (Australia) Wayne Arthurs / (Australia) Brent Larkham
2. (Netherlands) Tom Kempers / (Australia) Michael Tebbutt

== Qualifying draw ==
=== First qualifier ===
First round
1	(United States) Kelly Jones (United States) Kenny Thorne	3	7	3
(Italy) Laurence Tieleman (United States) David Witt	6	6	6
(Australia) Neil Borwick (Australia) Simon Youl	4	6	3
(Australia) Wayne Arthurs (Australia) Brent Larkham	6	3	6
(United States) Alexis Hombrecher (United States) Scott Sigerseth	6	5	3
(The Bahamas) Roger Smith (Kenya) Paul Wekesa	3	7	6
WC	(United Kingdom) Ross Matheson (United Kingdom) Danny Sapsford	7	0	2
5	(Australia) Grant Doyle (Australia) Paul Kilderry	6	6	6

Second round
(Italy) Laurence Tieleman (United States) David Witt	7	3	2
(Australia) Wayne Arthurs (Australia) Brent Larkham	6	6	6
(The Bahamas) Roger Smith (Kenya) Paul Wekesa	6	7	3
5	(Australia) Grant Doyle (Australia) Paul Kilderry	7	6	6

Qualifying competition
(Australia) Wayne Arthurs (Australia) Brent Larkham	6	6^{4}	4	6	8
5	(Australia) Grant Doyle (Australia) Paul Kilderry	4	7^{7}	6	2	10

=== Second qualifier ===
First round
2	(Australia) Joshua Eagle (Germany) Lars Rehmann	7	7
(United States) Todd Nelson (United States) John Sullivan	5	6
(Germany) Christian Saceanu (Germany) Arne Thoms	6	6
(United States) Jonathan Canter (South Africa) Mark Kaplan	3	2
(Colombia) Mauricio Hadad (Mexico) Ismael Hernández	3	7	6
(South Africa) Neville Godwin (South Africa) David Nainkin	6	6	4
(Germany) Martin Sinner (Netherlands) Joost Winnink	7	7
4	(United Kingdom) Neil Broad (United States) Matt Lucena	6	6

Second round
2	(Australia) Joshua Eagle (Germany) Lars Rehmann	6	7
(Germany) Christian Saceanu (Germany) Arne Thoms	1	5
(Colombia) Mauricio Hadad (Mexico) Ismael Hernández	4	7	6
(Germany) Martin Sinner (Netherlands) Joost Winnink	6	5	4

Qualifying competition
2	(Australia) Joshua Eagle (Germany) Lars Rehmann	7^{7}	6	6^{2}	2	6
(Colombia) Mauricio Hadad (Mexico) Ismael Hernández	6^{4}	3	7^{7}	6	2

=== Third qualifier ===
First round
3	(Sweden) Nicklas Utgren (Sweden) Lars-Anders Wahlgren	6	6
(United States) Martin Blackman (United States) Louis Gloria	2	4
(United States) Bill Behrens (United States) Michael Roberts	0	6
(Netherlands) Stephen Noteboom (Netherlands) Fernon Wibier	6	7
WC	(United Kingdom) Colin Beecher (United Kingdom) Jamie Delgado	3	4
(Sweden) Johan Donar (Sweden) Nils Holm	6	6
(Canada) Albert Chang (United States) Michael Zimmerman	3	6	1
6	(Netherlands) Tom Kempers (Australia) Michael Tebbutt	6	4	6

Second round
3	(Sweden) Nicklas Utgren (Sweden) Lars-Anders Wahlgren	4	5
(Netherlands) Stephen Noteboom (Netherlands) Fernon Wibier	6	7
(Sweden) Johan Donar (Sweden) Nils Holm	3	7	8
6	(Netherlands) Tom Kempers (Australia) Michael Tebbutt	6	6	10

Qualifying competition
(Netherlands) Stephen Noteboom (Netherlands) Fernon Wibier	6	6	4	4	6
6	(Netherlands) Tom Kempers (Australia) Michael Tebbutt	1	3	6	6	4
