= 1994 Japan Open Tennis Championships – Men's doubles =

Men's doubles
- 1994 Japan Open Tennis Championships

Final
- Champions: (Sweden) Henrik Holm (Sweden) Anders Järryd
- Runners-up: (Canada) Sébastien Lareau (United States) Patrick McEnroe
- Score: 7–6, 6–1

Details
- Draw: 28 (2Q / 4WC)
- Seeds: 8

Events
Singles	men	women
Doubles	men	women
- Japan Open

Ken Flach and Rick Leach were the defending champions, but competed this year with different partners. Flach teamed up with Brian Devening and lost in the second round to tournament runners-up Sébastien Lareau and Patrick McEnroe, while Leach teamed up with David Pate and lost in the first round to Kelly Jones and Mark Keil.

Henrik Holm and Anders Järryd won the title by defeating Sébastien Lareau and Patrick McEnroe 7–6, 6–1 in the final.

== Seeds ==
The top four seeds received a bye into the second round.

1. (Zimbabwe) Byron Black / (United States) Jonathan Stark (second round)
2. (South Africa) David Adams / (Russia) Andrei Olhovskiy (quarterfinals)
3. (Canada) Sébastien Lareau / (United States) Patrick McEnroe (final)
4. (Sweden) Henrik Holm / (Sweden) Anders Järryd (champions)
5. (United States) Rick Leach / (United States) David Pate (first round)
6. (Czech Republic) Martin Damm / (Australia) Sandon Stolle (quarterfinals)
7. (United States) Brad Pearce / (United States) Dave Randall (semifinals)
8. (Sweden) Jonas Björkman / (Australia) Patrick Rafter (semifinals)

== Draw ==
Key

- Q = Qualifier
- WC = Wild card
- LL = Lucky loser
- Alt = Alternate
- ITF = ITF entry
- PR = Protected ranking
- SR = Special ranking
- SE = Special exempt
- JE = Junior exempt
- JR = Junior Accelerator Programme entrant
- CO = College Accelerator Programme entrant
- NG = Next Gen Accelerator Program entrant
- w/o = Walkover
- r = Retired
- d = Defaulted

=== Finals ===
Semifinals
8	(Sweden) Jonas Björkman (Australia) Patrick Rafter	1	6
3	(Canada) Sébastien Lareau (United States) Patrick McEnroe	6	7
4	(Sweden) Henrik Holm (Sweden) Anders Järryd	6	6
7	(United States) Brad Pearce (United States) Dave Randall	4	2

Final
3	(Canada) Sébastien Lareau (United States) Patrick McEnroe	5	1
4	(Sweden) Henrik Holm (Sweden) Anders Järryd	7	6

=== Top half ===
First round
(United States) K Kinnear (United States) D Wheaton	6	6
Q	(Australia) B Ellwood (Australia) M Philippoussis	4	3
(United Kingdom) J Bates (Germany) A Mronz	6	7
(Argentina) J Frana (Venezuela) M Ruah	3	5
(Italy) O Camporese (Italy) C Caratti	3	5
8	(Sweden) J Björkman (Australia) P Rafter	6	7
(United States) B Devening (United States) D Flach	6	6
WC	(Japan) T Shimada (Japan) R Tsujino	4	3
(Australia) D Cahill (Australia) J Fitzgerald	6	7
(United Kingdom) T Henman (Netherlands) M Schapers	4	6
(Japan) S Matsuoka (Canada) G Rusedski	3	4
6	(Czech Republic) M Damm (Australia) S Stolle	6	6

Second round
1	(Zimbabwe) B Black (United States) J Stark	2	2
(United States) K Kinnear (United States) D Wheaton	6	6
(United Kingdom) J Bates (Germany) A Mronz	7	6	3
8	(Sweden) J Björkman (Australia) P Rafter	6	7	6
3	(Canada) S Lareau (United States) P McEnroe	6	6
(United States) B Devening (United States) D Flach	2	2
(Australia) D Cahill (Australia) J Fitzgerald	4	6
6	(Czech Republic) M Damm (Australia) S Stolle	6	7

Quarterfinals
(United States) K Kinnear (United States) D Wheaton	4	6	4
8	(Sweden) J Björkman (Australia) P Rafter	6	2	6
3	(Canada) S Lareau (United States) P McEnroe	6	6
6	(Czech Republic) M Damm (Australia) S Stolle	4	2

Semifinals
8	(Sweden) J Björkman (Australia) P Rafter	1	6
3	(Canada) S Lareau (United States) P McEnroe	6	7

=== Bottom half ===
First round
5	(United States) R Leach (United States) D Pate	6	6	6
(United States) K Jones (United States) M Keil	4	7	7
Q	(South Korea) B-s Kim (Japan) H Tanizawa	4	3
(France) G Raoux (France) S Simian	6	6
WC	(Japan) S Iwabuchi (Japan) T Suzuki	6	7
(Austria) A Antonitsch (Australia) N Borwick	3	5
7	(United States) B Pearce (United States) D Randall	6	6
WC	(United States) B Gilbert (United States) I Lendl	3	3
(Netherlands) J Siemerink (Czech Republic) D Vacek	3	6	4
(United States) J Tarango (Australia) M Tebbutt	6	0	6
WC	(United States) L Gloria (Japan) G Motomura	7	3	7
(Australia) J Morgan (United Kingdom) M Petchey	5	6	6

Second round
(United States) K Jones (United States) M Keil	3	6	2
(France) G Raoux (France) S Simian	6	4	6
WC	(Japan) S Iwabuchi (Japan) T Suzuki	2	4
4	(Sweden) H Holm (Sweden) A Järryd	6	6
7	(United States) B Pearce (United States) D Randall	6	6
(United States) J Tarango (Australia) M Tebbutt	4	4
WC	(United States) L Gloria (Japan) G Motomura	3	4
2	(South Africa) D Adams (Russia) A Olhovskiy	6	6

Quarterfinals
(France) G Raoux (France) S Simian	4	2
4	(Sweden) H Holm (Sweden) A Järryd	6	6
7	(United States) B Pearce (United States) D Randall	7	7
2	(South Africa) D Adams (Russia) A Olhovskiy	6	6

Semifinals
4	(Sweden) H Holm (Sweden) A Järryd	6	6
7	(United States) B Pearce (United States) D Randall	4	2
