= 1994 Japan Open Tennis Championships – Women's doubles =

Women's doubles
- 1994 Japan Open Tennis Championships
- 1993 Champions: (Japan) Ei Iida (Japan) Maya Kidowaki

Final
- Champions: (Japan) Mami Donoshiro (Japan) Ai Sugiyama
- Runners-up: (Indonesia) Yayuk Basuki (Japan) Nana Miyagi
- Score: 6–4, 6–1

Events
Singles	men	women
Doubles	men	women
← 1993 ·	Japan Open Tennis Championships	· 1995 →

Ei Iida and Maya Kidowaki were the defending champions but only Iida competed that year with Kyoko Nagatsuka.

Iida and Nagatsuka lost in the quarterfinals to Yayuk Basuki and Nana Miyagi.

Mami Donoshiro and Ai Sugiyama won in the final 6–4, 6–1 against Basuki and Miyagi.

== Seeds ==
Champion seeds are indicated in bold text while text in italics indicates the round in which those seeds were eliminated.

1. (Australia) Jenny Byrne / (Australia) Rachel McQuillan (quarterfinals)
2. (Indonesia) Yayuk Basuki / (Japan) Nana Miyagi (final)
3. (United States) Linda Harvey-Wild / (Australia) Kristine Radford (first round)
4. (Belgium) Sabine Appelmans / (Argentina) Florencia Labat (first round)

== Draw ==
=== Key ===
- Q = Qualifier
- WC = Wild card
- LL = Lucky loser
- Alt = Alternate
- ITF = ITF entry
- PR = Protected ranking
- SR = Special ranking
- SE = Special exempt
- JE = Junior exempt
- JR = Junior Accelerator Programme entrant
- CO = College Accelerator Programme entrant
- NG = Next Gen Accelerator Program entrant
- w/o = Walkover
- r = Retired
- d = Defaulted

First round
1	(Australia) **J Byrne** (Australia) **R McQuillan**	**6**	**6**
(Zimbabwe) P Iversen (Japan) H Nagano	1	0
(China) F Li (United States) T Whitlinger-Jones	3	3
(Australia) **M Jaggard-Lai** (United States) **M Werdel**	**6**	**6**
4	(Belgium) S Appelmans (Argentina) F Labat	2	0
(United States) **A Frazier** (Japan) **R Hiraki**	**6**	**6**
(Japan) M Endo (Japan) N Sawamatsu	3	0
WC	(Japan) **M Donoshiro** (Japan) **A Sugiyama**	**6**	**6**
(United States) A Leand (Czech Republic) E Švíglerová	4	4
(Canada) **M Bernard** (Canada) **C Delisle**	**6**	**6**
(Japan) **Y Kamio** (Japan) **N Kijimuta**	**6**	**6**
3	(United States) L Harvey-Wild (Australia) K Radford	2	4
Q	(Japan) H Mochizuki (Japan) Y Tanaka	**7**	2	4
(Japan) **E Iida** (Japan) **K Nagatsuka**	6	**6**	**6**
(Japan) A Hirose (Australia) D Jones	3	0
2	(Indonesia) **Y Basuki** (Japan) **N Miyagi**	**6**	**6**

Quarterfinals
1	(Australia) J Byrne (Australia) R McQuillan	0	6
(Australia) **M Jaggard-Lai** (United States) **M Werdel**	**6**	**7**
(United States) A Frazier (Japan) R Hiraki	5	**6**	3
WC	(Japan) **M Donoshiro** (Japan) **A Sugiyama**	**7**	2	**6**
(Canada) M Bernard (Canada) C Delisle	**7**	1	4
(Japan) **Y Kamio** (Japan) **N Kijimuta**	6	**6**	**6**
(Japan) E Iida (Japan) K Nagatsuka	**6**	2	2
2	(Indonesia) **Y Basuki** (Japan) **N Miyagi**	3	**6**	**6**

Semifinals
(Australia) M Jaggard-Lai (United States) M Werdel	6	**7**	2
WC	(Japan) **M Donoshiro** (Japan) **A Sugiyama**	**7**	5	**6**
(Japan) Y Kamio (Japan) N Kijimuta	**6**	1	6
2	(Indonesia) **Y Basuki** (Japan) **N Miyagi**	4	**6**	**7**

Final
WC	(Japan) **Mami Donoshiro** (Japan) **Ai Sugiyama**	**6**	**6**
2	(Indonesia) Yayuk Basuki (Japan) Nana Miyagi	4	1
