= David Hall (American tennis) =

American tennis player

- Country (sports): United States
- Height: 6 ft 0 in (183 cm)

Singles
- Highest ranking: No. 265 (Oct 24, 1994)

Grand Slam singles results
- Wimbledon: Q1 (1994)
- US Open: Q2 (1994)

Doubles
- Career record: 0–1
- Highest ranking: No. 376 (Nov 14, 1994)

David Hall is an American former professional tennis player.

Hall, who comes from Massachusetts, played collegiate tennis for Duke University and was a three-time All-ACC.

Graduating from Duke in 1993, Hall went on to compete on the professional tour, reaching a best singles world ranking of 265. In 1994 he featured in the qualifying draws at both Wimbledon and the US Open. His only ATP Tour main draw appearance came in doubles at the 1995 Hall of Fame Tennis Championships, as a wildcard pairing with Louis Gloria.
