= 1994 Japan Open Tennis Championships – Men's singles =

Men's singles
- 1994 Japan Open Tennis Championships

Final
- Champion: (United States) Pete Sampras
- Runner-up: (United States) Michael Chang
- Score: 6–4, 6–2

Details
- Draw: 56 (7 Q / 5 WC )
- Seeds: 16

Events
| Singles | men | women |
| Doubles | men | women |
- Japan Open

Defending champion Pete Sampras defeated Michael Chang in the final, 6–4, 6–2 to win the men's singles tennis title at the 1994 Japan Open Tennis Championships.

== Seeds ==
The top eight seeds received a bye into the second round.

1. (United States) Pete Sampras (champion)
2. (United States) Michael Chang (final)
3. (Germany) Boris Becker (semifinals)
4. (United States) Ivan Lendl (quarterfinals)
5. (United States) Aaron Krickstein (third round)
6. (United States) Brad Gilbert (quarterfinals)
7. (Australia) Patrick Rafter (quarterfinals)
8. (Israel) Amos Mansdorf (second round)
9. (United States) Jonathan Stark (third round)
10. (United States) Patrick McEnroe (third round)
11. (Sweden) Henrik Holm (semifinals)
12. (Czech Republic) Daniel Vacek (third round)
13. (Canada) Greg Rusedski (second round)
14. (Australia) Jamie Morgan (first round)
15. (Argentina) Javier Frana (first round)
16. (Zimbabwe) Byron Black (first round)

== Draw ==
Key

- Q = Qualifier
- WC = Wild card
- LL = Lucky loser
- Alt = Alternate
- ITF = ITF entry
- PR = Protected ranking
- SR = Special ranking
- SE = Special exempt
- JE = Junior exempt
- JR = Junior Accelerator Programme entrant
- CO = College Accelerator Programme entrant
- NG = Next Gen Accelerator Program entrant
- w/o = Walkover
- r = Retired
- d = Defaulted

=== Finals ===
Quarterfinals
1 | (United States) Pete Sampras | 6 | 5 | 6
7 | (Australia) Patrick Rafter | 1 | 7 | 1
4 | (United States) Ivan Lendl | 7 | 1 | 2
11 | (Sweden) Henrik Holm | 5 | 6 | 6
6 | (United States) Brad Gilbert | 3 | 0
3 | (Germany) Boris Becker | 6 | 6
(United States) David Wheaton | 6^{3} | 3
2 | (United States) Michael Chang | 7^{7} | 6

Semifinals
1 | (United States) Pete Sampras | 6 | 6
11 | (Sweden) Henrik Holm | 2 | 1
3 | (Germany) Boris Becker | 6^{2} | 2
2 | (United States) Michael Chang | 7^{7} | 6

Final
1 | (United States) Pete Sampras | 6 | 6
2 | (United States) Michael Chang | 4 | 2

=== Top half ===
==== Section 1 ====
First round
(Russia) A Olhovskiy | 6 | 6
WC | (Japan) Y Yamamoto | 4 | 4
Q | (United Kingdom) T Henman | 6 | 6
Q | (United States) K Jones | 2 | 3
(Australia) D Cahill | 6 | 6
15 | (Argentina) J Frana | 2 | 0
10 | (United States) P McEnroe | 7^{8} | 6
(Italy) O Camporese | 6^{6} | 2
(United Kingdom) J Bates | 1 | 7 | 3
(United States) J Tarango | 6 | 5 | 6
Q | (Sweden) T Högstedt | 4 | 6 | 6
(Sweden) A Järryd | 6 | 4 | 4

Second round
1 | (United States) P Sampras | 6 | 7^{7}
(Russia) A Olhovskiy | 3 | 6^{5}
Q | (United Kingdom) T Henman | 2 | 7^{7} | 6
(Australia) D Cahill | 6 | 6^{5} | 1
10 | (United States) P McEnroe | 7^{7} | 6
(United States) J Tarango | 6^{5} | 4
Q | (Sweden) T Högstedt | 6^{5} | 2
7 | (Australia) P Rafter | 7^{7} | 6

Third round
1 | (United States) P Sampras | 6 | 6
Q | (United Kingdom) T Henman | 1 | 2
10 | (United States) P McEnroe | 3 | 2
7 | (Australia) P Rafter | 6 | 6

Quarterfinals
1 | (United States) P Sampras | 6 | 5 | 6
7 | (Australia) P Rafter | 1 | 7 | 1

==== Section 2 ====
First round
WC | (Japan) G Motomura | 6 | 6^{1} | 2
(Canada) S Lareau | 4 | 7^{7} | 6
(Sweden) J Björkman | 6 | 6
WC | (Japan) T Mori | 1 | 3
(Australia) N Borwick | 5 | 1
13 | (Canada) G Rusedski | 7 | 6
11 | (Sweden) H Holm | 4 | 6 | 6
WC | (Japan) R Tsujino | 6 | 1 | 2
(France) G Raoux | 6 | 6
WC | (Japan) K Masuda | 4 | 2
(Italy) G Pozzi | 7^{7} | 6
(Austria) A Antonitsch | 6^{4} | 1

Second round
4 | (United States) I Lendl | 6 | 6
(Canada) S Lareau | 1 | 4
(Sweden) J Björkman | 7 | 4 | 7^{7}
13 | (Canada) G Rusedski | 5 | 6 | 6^{5}
11 | (Sweden) H Holm | 7 | 6
(France) G Raoux | 5 | 4
(Italy) G Pozzi | 1 | 1
5 | (United States) A Krickstein | 6 | 6

Third round
4 | (United States) I Lendl | 7^{10} | 7^{9}
(Sweden) J Björkman | 6^{8} | 6^{7}
11 | (Sweden) H Holm | 4 | 6 | 6
5 | (United States) A Krickstein | 6 | 3 | 2

Quarterfinals
4 | (United States) I Lendl | 7 | 1 | 2
11 | (Sweden) H Holm | 5 | 6 | 6

=== Bottom half ===
==== Section 3 ====
First round
(Netherlands) J Siemerink | 4 | 4
Q | (Australia) M Tebbutt | 6 | 6
(Venezuela) M Ruah | 4 | 1
(United States) R Weiss | 6 | 6
(Germany) J Renzenbrink | 4 | 4
12 | (Czech Republic) D Vacek | 6 | 6
14 | (Australia) J Morgan | 6 | 6^{2} | 4
Q | (United States) L Gloria | 3 | 7^{7} | 6
(Denmark) K Carlsen | 6 | 5 | 6
Q | (South Korea) B-s Kim | 1 | 7 | 1
(Germany) A Mronz | 5 | 3
(France) S Simian | 7 | 6

Second round
6 | (United States) B Gilbert | 4 | 6 | 7^{7}
Q | (Australia) M Tebbutt | 6 | 4 | 6^{2}
(United States) R Weiss | 1 | 4
12 | (Czech Republic) D Vacek | 6 | 6
Q | (United States) L Gloria | 2 | 3
(Denmark) K Carlsen | 6 | 6
(France) S Simian | 3 | 6^{5}
3 | (Germany) B Becker | 6 | 7^{7}

Third round
6 | (United States) B Gilbert | 7^{8} | 6^{3} | 6
12 | (Czech Republic) D Vacek | 6^{6} | 7^{7} | 3
(Denmark) K Carlsen | 4 | 5
3 | (Germany) B Becker | 6 | 7

Quarterfinals
6 | (United States) B Gilbert | 3 | 0
3 | (Germany) B Becker | 6 | 6

==== Section 4 ====
First round
(United States) D Wheaton | 6 | 6
(United Kingdom) M Petchey | 1 | 4
Q | (United States) D Pate | 6 | 1 | 6
(Japan) S Matsuoka | 4 | 6 | 3
(Czech Republic) M Damm | 6 | 3 | 3
9 | (United States) J Stark | 3 | 6 | 6
16 | (Zimbabwe) B Black | 4 | 6 | 3
(Germany) H Dreekmann | 6 | 3 | 6
(United States) C Adams | 4 | 6 | 6
(Italy) C Caratti | 6 | 3 | 4
(Germany) M Zoecke | 3 | 0
(United States) D Flach | 6 | 6

Second round
8 | (Israel) A Mansdorf | 3 | 7 | 1
(United States) D Wheaton | 6 | 5 | 6
Q | (United States) D Pate | 1 | 0
9 | (United States) J Stark | 6 | 6
(Germany) H Dreekmann | 3 | 3
(United States) C Adams | 6 | 6
(United States) D Flach | 1 | 6^{2}
2 | (United States) M Chang | 6 | 7^{7}

Third round
(United States) D Wheaton | 6 | 6^{2} | 6
9 | (United States) J Stark | 2 | 7^{7} | 3
(United States) C Adams | 1 | 3
2 | (United States) M Chang | 6 | 6

Quarterfinals
(United States) D Wheaton | 6^{3} | 3
2 | (United States) M Chang | 7^{7} | 6
