= Michael Roberts (tennis) =

American tennis player

- Country (sports): United States
- Prize money: $10,309

Singles
- Highest ranking: No. 415 (July 25, 1994)

Grand Slam singles results
- Australian Open: Q1 (1994)
- Wimbledon: Q1 (1994)
- US Open: Q1 (1994)

Doubles
- Career record: 0–1
- Highest ranking: No. 269 (June 21, 1993)

Grand Slam doubles results
- Wimbledon: Q1 (1994)

Michael Roberts is a former professional tennis player.

Roberts was a collegiate tennis player for UC Irvine before competing on the professional tour in the early 1990s, where he reached a best singles world ranking of 415. He made his only ATP Tour main draw appearance as a doubles qualifier at the 1990 Volvo Tennis Los Angeles tournament, partnering Van Winitsky.

== ATP Challenger finals ==
=== Doubles: 1 (0–1) ===
Result	Date	Tournament	Surface	Partner	Opponents	Score
Loss	Jul 1994	Aptos, United States	Hard	(United States) Donny Isaak	(United States) Brian MacPhie (United States) Alex O'Brien	2–6, 6–7
