= 1994 Wimbledon Championships – Women's doubles qualifying =

Women's doubles qualifying
- 1994 Wimbledon Championships

Events
Singles	men	women		boys	girls
Doubles	men	women	mixed	boys	girls
WC Singles	men	women	quad
WC Doubles	men	women	quad
Legends	men	women	seniors

Qualification
Singles	men	women
Doubles	men	women
- Wimbledon Championships

Players and pairs who neither have high enough rankings nor receive wild cards may participate in a qualifying tournament held one week before the annual Wimbledon Tennis Championships.

== Seeds ==
1. (Australia) Tracey Morton-Rodgers / (United States) Vickie Paynter (first round)
2. (France) Karine Quentrec / (France) Sandrine Testud (qualified)
3. (Sweden) Maria Lindström / (Sweden) Maria Strandlund (qualified)
4. (United States) Elly Hakami / (United States) Ann Henricksson (first round)

== Qualifiers ==
1. (Sweden) Maria Lindström / (Sweden) Maria Strandlund
2. (France) Karine Quentrec / (France) Sandrine Testud

== Lucky losers ==
1. (Netherlands) Gaby Coorengel / (United Kingdom) Alison Smith
2. (Australia) Nicole Pratt / (United States) Julie Steven

== Qualifying draw ==
=== First qualifier ===
First round
1	(Australia) Tracey Morton-Rodgers (United States) Vickie Paynter	6	3	1
(Netherlands) Gaby Coorengel (United Kingdom) Alison Smith	4	6	6
(Japan) Ei Iida (Australia) Louise Pleming	1	2
(Australia) Kristin Godridge (South Africa) Tessa Price	6	6
3	(Sweden) Maria Lindström (Sweden) Maria Strandlund	6	6
(United States) Varalee Sureephong (Canada) Vanessa Webb	4	1
(Belgium) Els Callens (Belgium) Nancy Feber	6	6
(United States) Amy deLone (United States) Erika deLone	2	2

Second round
(Netherlands) Gaby Coorengel (United Kingdom) Alison Smith	7	6
(Australia) Kristin Godridge (South Africa) Tessa Price	6	2
3	(Sweden) Maria Lindström (Sweden) Maria Strandlund	6	1	6
(Belgium) Els Callens (Belgium) Nancy Feber	0	6	2

Qualifying competition
(Netherlands) Gaby Coorengel (United Kingdom) Alison Smith	6	1	4
3	(Sweden) Maria Lindström (Sweden) Maria Strandlund	3	6	6

=== Second qualifier ===
First round
(Australia) Nicole Pratt (United States) Julie Steven	4	6	6
WC	(United Kingdom) Lucie Ahl (United Kingdom) Joanne Moore	6	2	3
(Czech Republic) Pavlína Rajzlová (Switzerland) Emanuela Zardo	2	6	6
4	(United States) Elly Hakami (United States) Ann Henricksson	6	1	3
(Ukraine) Elena Tatarkova (Poland) Katarzyna Teodorowicz	7	6
(Russia) Natalia Egorova (Russia) Svetlana Parkhomenko	6	2
(Australia) Justine Hodder (Australia) Kirrily Sharpe	4	4
2	(France) Karine Quentrec (France) Sandrine Testud	6	6

Second round
(Australia) Nicole Pratt (United States) Julie Steven	6	6
(Czech Republic) Pavlína Rajzlová (Switzerland) Emanuela Zardo	4	3
(Ukraine) Elena Tatarkova (Poland) Katarzyna Teodorowicz	6	6
2	(France) Karine Quentrec (France) Sandrine Testud	7	7

Qualifying competition
(Australia) Nicole Pratt (United States) Julie Steven	6	6	6
2	(France) Karine Quentrec (France) Sandrine Testud	7	3	8
