= Tennis at the 1991 Summer Universiade =

Tennis events were contested at the 1991 Summer Universiade in Sheffield, United Kingdom.

== Medal summary ==
Event	Gold	Silver	Bronze
Men's Singles	Xia Jiaping (CHN)	Francesco Michelotti (ITA)	Alessandro Pozzi (ITA); Jeffrey Hunter (GBR)
Men's Doubles	Chang Eui-jong and Ji Seung-ho (KOR)	Jeffrey Hunter and Mark Loosemore (GBR)	Alessandro Pozzi and Francesco Michelotti (ITA); Dede Suhendar Dinata and Sulistyo Wibowo (INA)
Women's Singles	Mana Endo (JPN)	Rika Hiraki (JPN)	Kim Il-Sun (KOR); Rosa Bielsa (ESP)
Women's Doubles	Mana Endo and Rika Hiraki (JPN)	Kim Il-sun and Lee Jeong-myeong (KOR)	Angela Lettiere and Erika Kuttler (USA); Eva-Maria Schürhoff; Anke Marchl (GER)
Mixed Doubles	Susan Gilchrist and Brett Hansen-Dent (USA)	Tetsuya Sato and Rika Hiraki (JPN)	Katrina Adams and Greg Van Emburgh (USA); Rosa Bielsa and Constantino Villar (ESP)

== Medal table ==
Rank	Nation	Gold	Silver	Bronze	Total
1	Japan (JPN)	2	2	0	4
2	South Korea (KOR)	1	1	1	3
3	United States (USA)	1	0	2	3
4	China (CHN)	1	0	0	1
5	Italy (ITA)	0	1	2	3
6	Great Britain (GBR)	0	1	1	2
7	Spain (ESP)	0	0	2	2
8	Germany (GER)	0	0	1	1
8	Indonesia (INA)	0	0	1	1
Totals (9 entries)		5	5	10	20

== See also ==
- Tennis at the Summer Universiade
