= Carlos Gómez-Díaz =

Argentine tennis player

- Country (sports): Argentina
- Born: 24 December 1968 (age 56); Rafaela, Argentina
- Prize money: $64,983

Singles
- Highest ranking: No. 198 (29 May 1995)

Grand Slam singles results
- Australian Open: Q1 (1998)
- French Open: Q2 (1996)
- Wimbledon: Q1 (1997)
- US Open: Q2 (1994)

Doubles
- Career record: 0–1
- Highest ranking: No. 226 (18 Sep 1995)

Carlos Gómez-Díaz (born 24 December 1968) is an Argentine former professional tennis player.

Born and raised in Rafaela, Gómez-Díaz was based in France during his career and reached a best singles world ranking of 198. He featured in the qualifying draws of all four grand slam tournaments and had multiple wins over Gustavo Kuerten on the satellite tour. His only ATP Tour main draw appearance came in doubles at Bucharest in 1994.

Gómez-Díaz, who coached Gilles Müller on the junior circuit, emigrated to Fort Lauderdale, Florida in 2003.

== ATP Challenger/ITF Futures finals ==
=== Singles: 5 (2–3) ===
Legend
ITF Futures (2–3)

Result	W–L	Date	Tournament	Tier	Surface	Opponent	Score
Loss	0–1	Jun 1998	Poland F2, Zabrze	Futures	Clay	(Czech Republic) Jan Hernych	4–6, 7–6, 2–6
Win	1–1	Jul 1998	France F2, Aix-en-Provence	Futures	Clay	(United States) Hugo Armando	6–4, 6–4
Loss	1–2	Sep 1998	Peru F2, Lima	Futures	Clay	(Peru) Luis Horna	6–7, 6–7
Loss	1–3	Sep 1998	Peru F3, Lima	Futures	Clay	(Peru) Luis Horna	2–6, 6–7
Win	2–3	Jun 1999	Hungary F1, Budapest	Futures	Clay	(Hungary) Gergely Kisgyörgy	7–6, 6–7, 6–4

=== Doubles: 2 (1–1) ===
Legend
ATP Challenger (0–1)
ITF Futures (1–0)

Result	W–L	Date	Tournament	Tier	Surface	Partner	Opponents	Score
Loss	0–1	Aug 1995	Istanbul Challenger, Istanbul	Challenger	Hard	(Spain) Álex Calatrava	(Italy) Omar Camporese (Switzerland) Lorenzo Manta	3–6, 4–6
Win	1–0	Feb 1998	Ghana F2, Accra	Futures	Clay	(Brazil) Ricardo Schlachter	(Germany) Lars Kirschner (Germany) Wolfgang Winkler	6–2, 6–2
