= 1994 Wimbledon Championships – Women's singles qualifying =

Women's singles qualifying
- 1994 Wimbledon Championships

Events
Singles	men	women		boys	girls
Doubles	men	women	mixed	boys	girls
WC Singles	men	women	quad
WC Doubles	men	women	quad
Legends	men	women	seniors

Qualification
Singles	men	women
Doubles	men	women
- Wimbledon Championships

Players and pairs who neither have high enough rankings nor receive wild cards may participate in a qualifying tournament held one week before the annual Wimbledon Tennis Championships.

== Seeds ==
1. (France) Alexia Dechaume-Balleret (qualified)
2. (Japan) Ai Sugiyama (qualifying competition, lucky loser)
3. (Germany) Karin Kschwendt (second round)
4. (South Africa) Tessa Price (qualifying competition, lucky loser)
5. (Czech Republic) Andrea Strnadová (qualifying competition, lucky loser)
6. (Japan) Misumi Miyauchi (second round)
7. (Belgium) Sandra Wasserman (first round)
8. (Finland) Nanne Dahlman (first round)
9. (South Korea) Park Sung-hee (first round)
10. (Netherlands) Petra Kamstra (first round)
11. (Australia) Rennae Stubbs (second round)
12. (Belgium) Nancy Feber (qualified)
13. (Australia) Elizabeth Smylie (qualified)
14. (Australia) Michelle Jaggard-Lai (second round)
15. (Japan) Rika Hiraki (first round)
16. (Italy) Rita Grande (first round)

== Qualifiers ==
1. (France) Alexia Dechaume-Balleret
2. (Australia) Louise Field
3. (Belgium) Nancy Feber
4. (France) Isabelle Demongeot
5. (Japan) Nana Miyagi
6. (Australia) Elizabeth Smylie
7. (Argentina) Mercedes Paz
8. (United States) Katrina Adams

== Lucky losers ==
1. (Netherlands) Claire Wegink
2. (South Africa) Tessa Price
3. (Czech Republic) Andrea Strnadová
4. (Japan) Ai Sugiyama

== Qualifying draw ==
=== First qualifier ===
First round
1	(France) Alexia Dechaume-Balleret	6	7
(Japan) Ei Iida	0	5
(United States) Julie Steven	6	7^{7}
WC	(United Kingdom) Joanne Moore	3	6^{5}
(Belarus) Tatiana Ignatieva	1	6	2
(Australia) Catherine Barclay	6	2	6
(Australia) Kristin Godridge	5	6	6
9	(South Korea) Park Sung-hee	7	3	4

Second round
1	(France) Alexia Dechaume-Balleret	6	6
(United States) Julie Steven	1	0
(Australia) Catherine Barclay	4	1
(Australia) Kristin Godridge	6	6

Qualifying competition
1	(France) Alexia Dechaume-Balleret	6	7^{7}
(Australia) Kristin Godridge	0	6^{5}

=== Second qualifier ===
First round
15	(Japan) Rika Hiraki	4	5
(United States) Elly Hakami	6	7
(Netherlands) Claire Wegink	4	6	6
(Austria) Katharina Büche	6	2	2
(South Africa) Dinky van Rensburg	5	6^{6}
(Australia) Louise Field	7	7^{8}
WC	(United Kingdom) Alison Smith	6	3	3
6	(Japan) Misumi Miyauchi	4	6	6

Second round
(United States) Elly Hakami	7^{7}	2	3
(Netherlands) Claire Wegink	6^{4}	6	6
(Australia) Louise Field	6	7
6	(Japan) Misumi Miyauchi	2	5

Qualifying competition
(Netherlands) Claire Wegink	4	6	5
(Australia) Louise Field	6	1	7

=== Third qualifier ===
First round
4	(South Africa) Tessa Price	3	6	7
(Austria) Melanie Schnell	6	1	5
(Slovenia) Tina Križan	6	6
(Australia) Annabel Ellwood	1	4
(Austria) Marion Maruska	2	3^{r}
(Czech Republic) Pavlína Rajzlová	6	4
(Australia) Nicole Pratt	0	4
12	(Belgium) Nancy Feber	6	6

Second round
4	(South Africa) Tessa Price	6	7^{7}
(Slovenia) Tina Križan	3	6^{5}
(Czech Republic) Pavlína Rajzlová	6^{2}	4
12	(Belgium) Nancy Feber	7^{7}	6

Qualifying competition
4	(South Africa) Tessa Price	6	3	4
12	(Belgium) Nancy Feber	1	6	6

=== Fourth qualifier ===
First round
14	(Australia) Michelle Jaggard-Lai	7	7
WC	(United Kingdom) Lucie Ahl	5	5
(France) Isabelle Demongeot	6	6
WC	(United Kingdom) Michele Mair	1	3
WC	(United Kingdom) Zoe Mellis	0	0
(Belgium) Els Callens	6	6
(Australia) Kirrily Sharpe	6	4	6
7	(Belgium) Sandra Wasserman	4	6	4

Second round
14	(Australia) Michelle Jaggard-Lai	2	4
(France) Isabelle Demongeot	6	6
(Belgium) Els Callens	4	6^{2}
(Australia) Kirrily Sharpe	6	7^{7}

Qualifying competition
(France) Isabelle Demongeot	6	6
(Australia) Kirrily Sharpe	0	4

=== Fifth qualifier ===
First round
5	(Czech Republic) Andrea Strnadová	6	6
(Netherlands) Carin Bakkum	4	4
(Poland) Katarzyna Teodorowicz	6	3	4
(Australia) Jo-Anne Faull	1	6	6
(France) Nathalie Herreman	4	6	6
(Italy) Emanuela Brusati	6	4	2
(Japan) Nana Miyagi	6	2	6
10	(Netherlands) Petra Kamstra	2	6	1

Second round
5	(Czech Republic) Andrea Strnadová	7^{7}	5	6
(Australia) Jo-Anne Faull	6^{2}	7	3
(France) Nathalie Herreman	3	7^{7}	0
(Japan) Nana Miyagi	6	6^{3}	6

Qualifying competition
5	(Czech Republic) Andrea Strnadová	6	2	5
(Japan) Nana Miyagi	4	6	7

=== Sixth qualifier ===
First round
13	(Australia) Elizabeth Smylie	6	4	9
(Ukraine) Elena Tatarkova	2	6	7
(Russia) Svetlana Parkhomenko	6	6
WC	(United Kingdom) Caroline Herbert	3	3
(Italy) Gloria Pizzichini	6	4	7
(United States) Shannan McCarthy	3	6	5
WC	(United Kingdom) Lorna Woodroffe	6^{5}	6	2
3	(Germany) Karin Kschwendt	7^{7}	4	6

Second round
13	(Australia) Elizabeth Smylie	6	7
(Russia) Svetlana Parkhomenko	3	5
(Italy) Gloria Pizzichini	6	6
3	(Germany) Karin Kschwendt	2	2

Qualifying competition
13	(Australia) Elizabeth Smylie	2	6	6
(Italy) Gloria Pizzichini	6	2	4

=== Seventh qualifier ===
First round
8	(Finland) Nanne Dahlman	5	6^{7}
WC	(South Africa) Mariaan de Swardt	7	7^{9}
(Sweden) Maria Strandlund	6	6
(United States) Erika deLone	1	2
(Argentina) Mercedes Paz	6	6
(Australia) Kerry-Anne Guse	4	4
(Japan) Hiroko Mochizuki	2	5
11	(Australia) Rennae Stubbs	6	7

Second round
WC	(South Africa) Mariaan de Swardt	6	6
(Sweden) Maria Strandlund	1	3
(Argentina) Mercedes Paz	6	6
11	(Australia) Rennae Stubbs	2	3

Qualifying competition
WC	(South Africa) Mariaan de Swardt	6	2	0
(Argentina) Mercedes Paz	4	6	6

=== Eighth qualifier ===
First round
16	(Italy) Rita Grande	3	4
(United States) Katrina Adams	6	6
(Italy) Federica Fortuni	2	3
(Japan) Naoko Kijimuta	6	6
(United States) Robin White	6	6
(United States) Ann Henricksson	3	3
(France) Lea Ghirardi	3	3
2	(Japan) Ai Sugiyama	6	6

Second round
(United States) Katrina Adams	6	6
(Japan) Naoko Kijimuta	4	3
(United States) Robin White	3	3
2	(Japan) Ai Sugiyama	6	6

Qualifying competition
(United States) Katrina Adams	6	3	7
2	(Japan) Ai Sugiyama	4	6	5
