= 1994 Japan Open Tennis Championships – Women's singles =

Women's singles
- 1994 Japan Open Tennis Championships

Final
- Champion: (Japan) Kimiko Date
- Runner-up: (United States) Amy Frazier
- Score: 7–5, 6–0

Details
- Draw: 32 (4 Q / 2 WC )
- Seeds: 8

Events
| Singles | men | women |
| Doubles | men | women |
| ← 1993 · | Japan Open | · 1995 → |

Kimiko Date was the defending champion and won in the final 7–5, 6–0 against Amy Frazier.

== Seeds ==
A champion seed is indicated in bold text while text in italics indicates the round in which that seed was eliminated.

1. (Japan) **Kimiko Date (champion)**
2. (Belgium) Sabine Appelmans (semifinals)
3. (Japan) Naoko Sawamatsu (semifinals)
4. (United States) Amy Frazier (final)
5. (United States) Patty Fendick (quarterfinals)
6. (Indonesia) Yayuk Basuki (first round)
7. (Japan) Mana Endo (first round)
8. (Chinese Taipei) Shi-Ting Wang (second round)

== Draw ==
=== Key ===
- Q = Qualifier
- WC = Wild card
- LL = Lucky loser
- Alt = Alternate
- ITF = ITF entry
- PR = Protected ranking
- SR = Special ranking
- SE = Special exempt
- JE = Junior exempt
- JR = Junior Accelerator Programme entrant
- CO = College Accelerator Programme entrant
- NG = Next Gen Accelerator Program entrant
- w/o = Walkover
- r = Retired
- d = Defaulted

First round
1 | (Japan) **K Date** | 5 | **6** | **6**
Q | (Japan) H Mochizuki | **7** | 1 | 3
WC | (Japan) **N Kijimuta** | 3 | **6** | **7**
(Japan) A Sugiyama | **6** | 3 | 6
Q | (South Africa) M Joubert | 2 | 0
(Austria) **B Schett** | **6** | **6**
(United States) **L Harvey-Wild** | **6** | 3 | **6**
7 | (Japan) M Endo | 4 | **6** | 0
3 | (Japan) **N Sawamatsu** | **6** | **6**
Q | (Japan) Y Yoshida | 4 | 0
(Australia) K Radford | 3 | **7** | 2
(Australia) **R McQuillan** | **6** | 5 | **6**
(Japan) M Miyauchi | **6** | 1 | 4
(Argentina) **F Labat** | 2 | **6** | **6**
(Netherlands) **L Niemantsverdriet** | **7** | **6**
6 | (Indonesia) Y Basuki | 6 | 3
5 | (United States) **P Fendick** | 4 | **7** | **6**
Q | (United States) J Ceniza | **6** | 5 | 3
(United States) **T Whitlinger-Jones** | **6** | **6**
(Japan) Y Kamio | 4 | 0
(France) S Testud | 4 | 2
(Japan) **K Nagatsuka** | **6** | **6**
(Czech Republic) E Švíglerová | 4 | **6** | 5
4 | (United States) **A Frazier** | **6** | 3 | **7**
8 | (Chinese Taipei) **S-T Wang** | **7** | **7**
(Austria) B Paulus | 6 | 5
(United States) **M Werdel** | 4 | **6** | **6**
(Australia) M Jaggard-Lai | **6** | 1 | 2
(China) F Li | 5 | **6** | 3
WC | (Japan) **N Miyagi** | **7** | 4 | **6**
(Italy) N Baudone | 2 | 4
2 | (Belgium) **S Appelmans** | **6** | **6**

Second round
1 | (Japan) **K Date** | **7** | 3 | **6**
WC | (Japan) N Kijimuta | 5 | **6** | 2
(Austria) **B Schett** | **6** | **6**
(United States) L Harvey-Wild | 4 | 4
3 | (Japan) **N Sawamatsu** | **6** | **6**
(Australia) R McQuillan | 3 | 0
(Argentina) **F Labat** | 4 | **6** | **6**
(Netherlands) L Niemantsverdriet | **6** | 4 | 3
5 | (United States) **P Fendick** | **6** | **6**
(United States) T Whitlinger-Jones | 2 | 3
(Japan) K Nagatsuka | 2 | 3
4 | (United States) **A Frazier** | **6** | **6**
8 | (Chinese Taipei) S-T Wang | 3 | 2
(United States) **M Werdel** | **6** | **6**
WC | (Japan) N Miyagi | 4 | 3
2 | (Belgium) **S Appelmans** | **6** | **6**

Quarterfinals
1 | (Japan) **K Date** | **6** | **6**
(Austria) B Schett | 0 | 1
3 | (Japan) **N Sawamatsu** | 5 | **6** | **6**
(Argentina) F Labat | **7** | 2 | 3
5 | (United States) P Fendick | 2 | **7** | 6
4 | (United States) **A Frazier** | **6** | 6 | **7**
(United States) M Werdel | 2 | 0
2 | (Belgium) **S Appelmans** | **6** | **6**

Semifinals
1 | (Japan) **K Date** | **6** | **6**
3 | (Japan) N Sawamatsu | 4 | 2
4 | (United States) **A Frazier** | **7** | **6**
2 | (Belgium) S Appelmans | 5 | 2

Final
1 | (Japan) **Kimiko Date** | **7** | **6**
4 | (United States) Amy Frazier | 5 | 0
