= Michael Zimmerman (tennis) =

American tennis player (born 1970)

- Full name: Michael John Zimmerman
- Country (sports): United States
- Born: May 19, 1970 (age 55)
- Plays: Right-handed
- Prize money: $26,982

Singles
- Highest ranking: No. 349 (October 3, 1994)

Grand Slam singles results
- Wimbledon: Q1 (1994)
- US Open: Q2 (1993, 1994)

Doubles
- Career record: 1–3
- Highest ranking: No. 225 (November 14, 1994)

Grand Slam doubles results
- Wimbledon: Q1 (1994)
Medal record
Maccabiah Games
| Gold medal – first place | 1993 Israel | Men's doubles |

Michael John Zimmerman (born May 19, 1970) is an American former professional tennis player. In both 1991 and 1992 he earned Ivy League Player of the Year and ITA All-American honors. In 1993, Zimmerman was a men's doubles gold medalist at the 1993 Maccabiah Games in Israel.

== Biography ==
Zimmerman grew up in Great Neck, New York, attended Great Neck North High School, and was coached by his uncle Bob Litwin. He played varsity tennis for Harvard University and was a member of four successive Ivy League championship winning teams, from 1989 to 1992. In both 1991 and 1992 he earned Ivy League Player of the Year and ITA All-American honors. As a junior, he was ranked as high as seventh in the U.S. and No. 1 in the East.

In 1993, Zimmerman was a men's doubles gold medalist at the 1993 Maccabiah Games (with Giora Payes) in Israel.

Zimmerman reached a best singles world ranking of 349 on the professional tour. He featured mostly at satellite and ATP Challenger level, but had a quarter-final appearance in doubles at an ATP Tour tournament in Bordeaux in 1994.

== Personal life ==
Zimmerman, who founded finance company Prentice Capital, married financial analyst Holly Becker in 2000.
