= Sandro Della Piana =

- Country (sports): Switzerland
- Born: 19 September 1968 (age 57)
- Plays: Right-handed
- Prize money: $14,972

Singles
- Highest ranking: No. 325 (15 Aug 1994)

Grand Slam singles results
- US Open: Q2 (1994)

Doubles
- Career record: 0–1 (ATP Tour)
- Highest ranking: No. 277 (8 Jan 1996)

Sandro Della Piana (born 19 September 1968) is a Swiss former professional tennis player.

Ranked as high as 325 in the world, Della Piana competed mostly on the satellite and Challenger circuits. He was a quarter-finalist at the 1994 Tampere Open and featured in the qualifying draw for the 1994 US Open. His career included an ATP Tour doubles main draw appearance at Schenectady in 1994.

Della Piana is the father of tennis player Henri Laaksonen, who was raised by his mother in her native Finland.
