= Michael Shyjan =

American tennis player

- Full name: Michael W. Shyjan
- Country (sports): United States
- Born: October 29, 1969 (age 55)
- Prize money: $12,982

Singles
- Career record: 0–2
- Highest ranking: No. 649 (April 12, 1993)

Grand Slam singles results
- Australian Open: Q1 (1994)
- US Open: Q2 (1993)

Doubles
- Career record: 0–2
- Highest ranking: No. 223 (June 12, 1995)

Michael Shyjan (born October 29, 1969) is an American former professional tennis player.

A Massachusetts-native of Ukrainian descent, Shyjan played collegiate tennis for Harvard University before touring professionally. In 1990 he was named Sophomore of the Year, for a season which included a win over reigning NCAA singles champion Donni Leaycraft. He was a doubles All-American in 1991 and team captain for his final two seasons. He currently resides in Chelmsford, Massachusetts.

Shyjan competed on the professional tour for five years, qualifying for ATP Tour singles main draws at Mexico City in 1993 and Newport in 1997. He featured mostly in satellite tournaments and the occasional ATP Challenger event.
