= Brian Gyetko =

Canadian tennis player (born 1968)

- Country (sports): Canada
- Born: January 26, 1968 (age 58)
- Height: 6 ft 0 in (183 cm)
- Plays: Right-handed
- Prize money: $39,188

Singles
- Career record: 0–2
- Highest ranking: No. 273 (November 8, 1993)

Grand Slam singles results
- Wimbledon: Q1 (1994)
- US Open: Q2 (1994)

Doubles
- Career record: 4–10
- Highest ranking: No. 152 (May 15, 1995)

Grand Slam doubles results
- US Open: 1R (1994)

Other doubles tournaments
- Olympic Games: 2R (1992)

Brian Gyetko, a native of Welland, Ontario, (born January 26, 1968) is a Canadian professional tennis player. As a junior player in 1985, Gyetko was ranked 18th in final International Tennis Federation world rankings and second in doubles with Andrew Sznajder. Gyetko played collegiately at Arizona State University from 1987 - 1991, where he achieved NCAA All American status. Gyetko was the male athlete of the year in 1991 at ASU, winning the Harry Rosenzweig Senior Award, which recognizes the top senior male student-athlete of the year based on academic and athletic excellence.

== Professional tennis career ==
Brian Gyetko was a full-time ATP tour player for four years reaching a world ranking of 273 in singles and 152 in doubles. Gyetko was a quarter-finalist in the ATP 1000 series event in Toronto in doubles, with wins over Bryan Shelton and Patrick Rafter (the '97 and '98 US Open Singles champion). Gyetko represented Canada in the Barcelona Olympics in 1992 (finishing 9th to 16th). In 1992 in Glendale, Arizona, Gyetko teamed with Bryan Shelton to make the finals of a 50K challenger, defeating the Jensen brothers (French Open doubles winnerschampions) along the way. While still an undergraduate at ASU, he won the Canadian national singles title defeating Grant Connell (world ranking #67 at that time) and Andrew Sznajder (#53 in 1989) on the way to the title.

== Davis Cup ==
In 1993, Gyetko represented Canada in its Davis Cup match with Chile. He played with current Davis Cup captain, Martin Laurandeau.

== Olympics ==
Gyetko competed for Canada in the 1992 Summer Olympics in Barcelona.

== NCAA Tennis ==
- Played 1987 to 1991 at Arizona State University
- NCAA quarterfinalist in singles as a senior
- 3 time All-America at ASU
- Male Athlete of the year in 1991 at ASU, winning the Harry Rosenzweig Senior Award
- Ranked number 2 in the NCAA doubles rankings as a freshman
- Played number 1 doubles at ASU all 4 years.
- Played number 1 singles sophomore, junior and senior years, number 4 as a freshman at ASU
- Winner of the Milwaukee Classic doubles as a freshman and senior, runner up in the singles as a junior

== Junior Tennis ==
- Ranked as high as 18th in singles and 2nd in doubles on the ITF junior world rankings in 1985.
- Winner of the Canadian Junior U18 Indoor and Outdoor National singles titles in 1985
- Winner of the Canadian Junior U16 Outdoor National singles and doubles titles in 1984
- Round of 16 in the U16 Orange Bowl
- Finished 3rd in Canada U12 and U14
- Ranked number 1 in Ontario throughout junior career
- Started playing tennis at 3 years old

== Education ==
- Bachelor of Science Engineering – Aerospace
  - Arizona State University
  - 3.67 GPA (Magna Cumme Laude)
  - 1987 - 1992
- Member of Sigma Gamma Tau (National Aerospace Engineering Honour Society)
- Member of Tau Beta Pi (National Engineering Honour Society)

== Personal ==
- Father to Tomas and Ashley
