= Mami Donoshiro =

Japanese tennis player (born 1975)

- Country (sports): Japan
- Born: 8 March 1975 (age 50)
- Prize money: $35,340

Singles
- Career record: 49–57
- Highest ranking: No. 317 (26 October 1992)

Doubles
- Career record: 47–32
- Career titles: 1 WTA
- Highest ranking: No. 93 (19 September 1994)

Grand Slam doubles results
- Wimbledon: 1R (1994)

Mami Donoshiro (born 8 March 1975) is a Japanese former professional tennis player.

Donoshiro played on the professional tour in the 1990s and reached 93 in the world rankings as a doubles player. While partnering Ai Sugiyama in 1994 she featured in the main draw at Wimbledon and won the Japan Open, which was her only WTA Tour title.

== WTA Tour finals ==
=== Doubles (1-0) ===
| Result | Date | Tournament | Tier | Surface | Partner | Opponents | Score |
|---|---|---|---|---|---|---|---|
| Win | Apr 1994 | Tokyo, Japan | WTA Tier III | Hard | (Japan) Ai Sugiyama | (Indonesia) Yayuk Basuki (Japan) Nana Miyagi | 6–4, 6–1 |

== ITF finals ==
$25,000 tournaments
$10,000 tournaments

=== Singles: 3 (2–1) ===
| Result | No. | Date | Tournament | Surface | Opponent | Score |
|---|---|---|---|---|---|---|
| Win | 1. | 12 October 1992 | Tokyo, Japan | Hard | (Japan) Masako Yanagi | 7–5, 6–4 |
| Win | 2. | 18 October 1993 | Kugayama, Japan | Hard | (Japan) Yuka Tanaka | 4–6, 6–3, 6–1 |
| Loss | 1. | 27 March 1995 | Jakarta, Indonesia | Hard | (South Korea) Choi Ju-yeon | 1–6, 7–6^{(2)}, 2–6 |

=== Doubles: 8 (3–5) ===
| Result | No. | Date | Tournament | Surface | Partner | Opponents | Score |
|---|---|---|---|---|---|---|---|
| Win | 1. | 10 February 1992 | Bangkok, Thailand | Hard | (Japan) Ai Sugiyama | (China) Huang Qian (China) Yang Li-hua | 6–4, 3–6, 6–4 |
| Loss | 1. | 17 February 1992 | Bandung, Indonesia | Hard | (Japan) Ai Sugiyama | (China) Chen Li-Ling (China) Yi Jing-Qian | 6–4, 3–6, 4–6 |
| Loss | 2. | 5 October 1992 | Kuroshio, Japan | Hard | (Japan) Yuka Tanaka | (Japan) Yuko Hosoki (Japan) Naoko Kijimuta | 2–6, 4–6 |
| Win | 2. | 18 October 1993 | Kugayama, Japan | Hard | (Japan) Yuka Tanaka | (Japan) Mana Endo (Japan) Masako Yanagi | 6–3, 6–3 |
| Loss | 3. | 12 June 1994 | Caserta, Italy | Clay | (Japan) Kyōko Nagatsuka | (Japan) Flora Perfetti (Hungary) Virág Csurgó | 1–6, 5–7 |
| Loss | 4. | 31 October 1994 | Saga, Japan | Grass | (Japan) Yuka Tanaka | (Japan) Ei Iida (Australia) Louise Pleming | 3–6, 6–7^{(2)} |
| Loss | 5. | 8 May 1995 | Seoul, South Korea | Clay | (Japan) Keiko Ishida | (South Korea) Kim Eun-ha (South Korea) Choi Ju-yeon | 3–6, 3–6 |
| Win | 3. | 1 April 1996 | Jakarta, Indonesia | Hard | (Japan) Kiyoko Yazawa | (Japan) Nao Akahori (Japan) Keiko Ishida | 6–2, 6–7^{(4)}, 6–4 |
