= Francesco Michelotti =

Italian tennis player

- Country (sports): Italy
- Born: 23 October 1969 (age 56) Parma, Italy
- Prize money: $50,317

Singles
- Career titles: 0–2
- Highest ranking: No. 213 (17 May 1993)

Grand Slam singles results
- French Open: Q3 (1993)
- Wimbledon: Q1 (1991)
- US Open: Q3 (1993)

Doubles
- Highest ranking: No. 649 (27 September 1993)
Medal record
Representing Italy
Summer Universiade
Silver medal – second place	1991 Sheffield	Singles
Bronze medal – third place	1991 Sheffield	Doubles
Bronze medal – third place	1995 Fukuoka	Singles

Francesco Michelotti (born 23 October 1969) is an Italian former professional tennis player.

== Biography ==
Born in Parma, Michelotti competed on the professional tour in the early 1990s.

In 1992 he qualified for the main draw of two ATP Tour events, in Bologna and Florence. At the Florence tournament he lost a close first round match to world number 37 Jordi Arrese, in a third set tiebreak.

Michelotti reached his best singles ranking of 213 in the world in 1993, with his performances that year including reaching the third and final qualifying round for the French Open and US Open.

As a representative of Italy he won three medals at the Summer Universiade during his career, a singles silver and doubles bronze in 1991, then another singles medal in 1995, this time a bronze.
