= Robert Eriksson (tennis) =

Swedish tennis player

- Country (sports): Sweden
- Born: 7 September 1971 (age 53)
- Plays: Right-handed
- Prize money: $18,315

Singles
- Career record: 0–1
- Career titles: 0
- Highest ranking: No. 281 (15 August 1994)

Grand Slam singles results
- US Open: 1R (1994)

Doubles
- Highest ranking: No. 337 (21 August 1995)

Robert Eriksson (born 7 September 1971) is a former professional tennis player from Sweden.

Eriksson lost in the opening round of the 1994 US Open to Andre Agassi, who went on to win the tournament.
