= 1994 Japan Open Tennis Championships =

- Date: 4–11 April
- Edition: 21st
- Surface: Hard / outdoor
- Location: Tokyo, Japan
- Venue: Ariake Coliseum

Champions

Men's singles
- (United States) Pete Sampras

Women's singles
- (Japan) Kimiko Date

Men's doubles
- (Sweden) Henrik Holm / (Sweden) Anders Järryd

Women's doubles
- (Japan) Mami Donoshiro / (Japan) Ai Sugiyama
- Japan Open

The 1994 Japan Open Tennis Championships was a combined men's and women's tennis tournament played on outdoor hard courts at the Ariake Coliseum in Tokyo in Japan that was part of the Championship Series of the 1994 ATP Tour and of Tier III of the 1994 WTA Tour. The tournament was held from 4 April through 11 April 1994. Pete Sampras and Kimiko Date won the singles titles.

== Finals ==
=== Men's singles ===
(United States) Pete Sampras defeated (United States) Michael Chang 6–4, 6–2

- It was Sampras' 6th title of the year and the 28th of his career.

=== Women's singles ===
(Japan) Kimiko Date defeated (United States) Amy Frazier 7–5, 6–0

- It was Date's 2nd title of the year and the 4th of her career.

=== Men's doubles ===
(Sweden) Henrik Holm / (Sweden) Anders Järryd defeated (Canada) Sébastien Lareau / (United States) Patrick McEnroe 7–6, 6–1

- It was Holm's 2nd title of the year and the 5th of his career. It was Järryd's 2nd title of the year and the 65th of his career.

=== Women's doubles ===
(Japan) Mami Donoshiro / (Japan) Ai Sugiyama defeated (Indonesia) Yayuk Basuki / (Japan) Nana Miyagi 6–4, 6–1

- It was Donoshiro's only title of the year and the 1st of her career. It was Sugiyama's only title of the year and the 1st of her career.
