= Donny Isaak =

American tennis player

- Country (sports): United States
- Born: 10 June 1969 (age 57) Carroll, Iowa, U.S.
- Prize money: $15,534

Singles
- Highest ranking: No. 288 (May 23, 1994)

Grand Slam singles results
- Australian Open: Q1 (1993, 1995)
- US Open: Q1 (1993, 1994)

Doubles
- Career record: 0–1
- Highest ranking: No. 231 (Apr 11, 1994)

Donny Isaak (born June 10, 1969) is an American former professional tennis player.

Isaak, a native of Carroll, Iowa, played collegiate tennis for the University of Southern California. He was a member of USC's 1991 NCAA championship team, as well as an NCAA singles semi-finalist and All-American that year.

In the early 1990s he competed on the professional tour and reached a best singles world ranking of 288. He made a doubles main draw appearance at Indian Wells in 1991, partnering Swede David Ekerot.

== ATP Challenger finals ==
=== Doubles: 2 (0–2) ===
| Result | No. | Date | Tournament | Surface | Partner | Opponents | Score |
|---|---|---|---|---|---|---|---|
| Loss | 1. | Sep 1992 | Azores, Portugal | Hard | (Sweden) Peter Nyborg | (Sweden) Henrik Holm (Sweden) Nicklas Utgren | 6–7, 6–7 |
| Loss | 2. | Jul 1994 | Aptos, United States | Hard | (United States) Michael Roberts | (United States) Brian MacPhie (United States) Alex O'Brien | 2–6, 6–7 |
