= 1994 US Open – Men's singles =

Men's singles
- 1994 US Open

Final
- Champion: (United States) Andre Agassi
- Runner-up: (Germany) Michael Stich
- Score: 6–1, 7–6^{(7–5)}, 7–5

Details
- Draw: 128
- Seeds: 16

Events
Singles	men	women		boys	girls
Doubles	men	women	mixed	boys	girls
WC Singles	men	women	quad
WC Doubles	men	women	quad
Legends	men	women	mixed
- US Open

Andre Agassi defeated Michael Stich in the final, 6–1, 7–6^{(7–5)}, 7–5 to win the men's singles tennis title at the 1994 US Open. It was his first US Open title and second major title overall. Agassi was the first unseeded player to win the title in the Open Era, and the first overall since Fred Stolle in 1966.

Pete Sampras was the defending champion, but lost in the fourth round to Jaime Yzaga in 5 sets. Sampras’ first grand slam main draw match was at the 1988 US Open where he faced Yzaga, who trailed 0-2 sets but beat Sampras in 5 sets. Sampras’ fourth round exit also ended his streak of 11 consecutive quarterfinal appearances in Majors dating back to the 1991 US Open.

This tournament marked the final professional appearance of former world No. 1 and eight-time major champion Ivan Lendl; he retired in his second round match versus Bernd Karbacher.

== Seeds ==
The seeded players are listed below. Andre Agassi is the champion; others show the round in which they were eliminated.

1. (United States) Pete Sampras (fourth round)
2. (Croatia) Goran Ivanišević (first round)
3. (Spain) Sergi Bruguera (fourth round)
4. (Germany) Michael Stich (finalist)
5. (Sweden) Stefan Edberg (third round)
6. (United States) Michael Chang (fourth round)
7. (Germany) Boris Becker (first round)
8. (Ukraine) Andrei Medvedev (second round)
9. (United States) Todd Martin (semifinalist)
10. (Spain) Alberto Berasategui (first round)
11. (United States) Jim Courier (second round)
12. (South Africa) Wayne Ferreira (third round)
13. (Austria) Thomas Muster (quarterfinalist)
14. (Russia) Yevgeny Kafelnikov (fourth round)
15. (Switzerland) Marc Rosset (third round)
16. (Czech Republic) Petr Korda (Did not play)

== Draw ==
=== Key ===
- Q = Qualifier
- WC = Wild card
- LL = Lucky loser
- r = Retired

=== Finals ===
Quarterfinals
(Peru) Jaime Yzaga	2	7^{9}	1	7	3
(Czech Republic) Karel Nováček	6	6^{7}	6	5	6
4	(Germany) Michael Stich	6	6	6^{7}	6
(Sweden) Jonas Björkman	4	4	7^{9}	4
(United States) Andre Agassi	7^{7}	6	6
13	(Austria) Thomas Muster	6^{5}	3	0
9	(United States) Todd Martin	6	7^{7}	4	6
(Germany) Bernd Karbacher	4	6^{5}	6	4

Semifinals
(Czech Republic) Karel Nováček	5	3	6^{4}
4	(Germany) Michael Stich	7	6	7^{7}
(United States) Andre Agassi	6	4	6	6
9	(United States) Todd Martin	3	6	2	3

Final
4	(Germany) Michael Stich	1	6^{5}	5
(United States) Andre Agassi	6	7^{7}	7

=== Section 1 ===
First round
1	(United States) P Sampras	6	6	6
Q	(Zimbabwe) K Ullyett	2	2	2
(Czech Republic) D Vacek	6^{5}	7	6	6
(Morocco) Y El Aynaoui	7^{7}	5	1	1
(Canada) G Rusedski	3	2	6	5
(Sweden) H Holm	6	6	3	7
(Italy) D Nargiso	6^{4}	4	0
Q	(The Bahamas) R Smith	7^{7}	6	6
(Australia) W Masur	2	6	5	1
WC	(United States) D Witt	6	3	7	6
(Peru) J Yzaga	7^{7}	6	6
(Argentina) G Markus	6^{4}	2	2
(France) R Gilbert	6	6	6^{3}	2	7
(Colombia) M Hadad	4	2	7^{7}	6	6
(France) C Pioline	6	7	4	6
LL	(Germany) O Gross	2	5	6	4

Second round
1	(United States) P Sampras	6	6	6
(Czech Republic) D Vacek	3	4	4
(Sweden) H Holm	3	6	6	1	2
Q	(The Bahamas) R Smith	6	1	3	6	6
WC	(United States) D Witt	1	7^{7}	4	4
(Peru) J Yzaga	6	6^{1}	6	6
(France) R Gilbert	6	3	6^{4}	3
(France) C Pioline	2	6	7^{7}	6

Third round
1	(United States) P Sampras	4	6	6	6
Q	(The Bahamas) R Smith	6	2	4	3
(Peru) J Yzaga	1	5	7	6	6
(France) C Pioline	6	7	5	1	4

Fourth round
1	(United States) P Sampras	6	3	6	6^{4}	5
(Peru) J Yzaga	3	6	4	7^{7}	7

=== Section 2 ===
First round
10	(Spain) A Berasategui	1	6	3	3
(South Africa) M Ondruska	6	2	6	6
WC	(United States) T Ho	3	3	6^{1}
(Sweden) C Bergström	6	6	7^{7}
Q	(Egypt) T El Sawy	6^{4}	6	4	2
WC	(United States) V Spadea	7^{7}	4	6	6
(Argentina) J Frana	6	1	4	7^{7}	6
WC	(The Bahamas) M Merklein	4	6	6	6^{3}	0
(Slovakia) K Kučera	4	6^{3}	3
(United Kingdom) M Petchey	6	7^{7}	6
Q	(Australia) P Kilderry	2	5	2
Q	(Australia) T Woodbridge	6	7	6
(Russia) A Volkov	2	6	1	5
(Czech Republic) K Nováček	6	3	6	7
(Austria) G Schaller	3	4	0
8	(Ukraine) A Medvedev	6	6	6

Second round
(South Africa) M Ondruska	7^{7}	6	6
(Sweden) C Bergström	6^{3}	3	0
WC	(United States) V Spadea	4	1	6	5
(Argentina) J Frana	6	6	0	7
(United Kingdom) M Petchey	3	2	4
Q	(Australia) T Woodbridge	6	6	6
(Czech Republic) K Nováček	6	6	6
8	(Ukraine) A Medvedev	3	2	2

Third round
(South Africa) M Ondruska	3	1	7^{7}	6	4
(Argentina) J Frana	6	6	6^{3}	3	6
Q	(Australia) T Woodbridge	6	7	6^{6}	2	6^{3}
(Czech Republic) K Nováček	1	5	7^{8}	6	7^{7}

Fourth round
(Argentina) J Frana	3	3	7^{7}	3
(Czech Republic) K Nováček	6	6	6^{3}	6

=== Section 3 ===
First round
4	(Germany) M Stich	7^{7}	6	6
(France) O Delaître	6^{3}	3	3
(Argentina) F Davín	0	1	1
(United States) S Bryan	6	6	6
(Spain) F Clavet	6	4	6	7^{9}
(France) J-P Fleurian	3	6	3	6^{7}
(United States) P McEnroe	6^{7}	2	4
(Zimbabwe) B Black	7^{9}	6	6
(Netherlands) J Siemerink	6^{2}	4	7^{7}	7^{10}	4
(Netherlands) R Krajicek	7^{7}	6	6^{2}	6^{8}	6
Q	(Venezuela) N Pereira	6	5	4	7	4
(Spain) C Costa	4	7	6	5	6
(Brazil) F Meligeni	2	3	6	4
(Czech Republic) M Damm	6	6	4	6
(Netherlands) J Eltingh	6^{4}	5	3
14	(Russia) Y Kafelnikov	7^{7}	7	6

Second round
4	(Germany) M Stich	6	6	6
(United States) S Bryan	1	4	2
(Spain) F Clavet	5	6	6	1	4
(Zimbabwe) B Black	7	1	3	6	6
(Netherlands) R Krajicek	6	6^{3}	3	6	6^{4}
(Spain) C Costa	4	7^{7}	6	1	7^{7}
(Czech Republic) M Damm	3	6^{5}	6^{5}
14	(Russia) Y Kafelnikov	6	7^{7}	7^{7}

Third round
4	(Germany) M Stich	7^{7}	6	6
(Zimbabwe) B Black	6^{5}	2	1
(Spain) C Costa	3	4	2
14	(Russia) Y Kafelnikov	6	6	6

Fourth round
4	(Germany) M Stich	7^{10}	6	6
14	(Russia) Y Kafelnikov	6^{8}	3	2

=== Section 4 ===
First round
11	(United States) J Courier	6	6	6
(United States) A Krickstein	3	4	4
(Italy) A Gaudenzi	7^{7}	6	7^{7}
Q	(Canada) A Chang	6^{3}	1	6^{2}
(Spain) A Costa	1	5	2
(Morocco) K Alami	6	7	6
(Germany) J Renzenbrink	6	6	6
(South Africa) G Stafford	1	4	4
(Netherlands) P Haarhuis	3	6^{1}	3
(United States) A O'Brien	6	7^{7}	6
(Sweden) J Björkman	6	6	7
(United States) J Stark	2	2	5
(United States) J Tarango	4	7	6	3	6
Q	(Sweden) L-A Wahlgren	6	5	4	6	3
(Sweden) L Jönsson	5	1	1
5	(Sweden) S Edberg	7	6	6

Second round
11	(United States) J Courier	5	2	6	3
(Italy) A Gaudenzi	7	6	3	6
(Morocco) K Alami	3	4	7^{9}	3
(Germany) J Renzenbrink	6	6	6^{7}	6
(United States) A O'Brien	2	3	4
(Sweden) J Björkman	6	6	6
(United States) J Tarango	2	3	2
5	(Sweden) S Edberg	6	6	6

Third round
(Italy) A Gaudenzi	4	1	3
(Germany) J Renzenbrink	6	6	6
(Sweden) J Björkman	6	6	6
5	(Sweden) S Edberg	4	4	0

Fourth round
(Germany) J Renzenbrink	6	3	2	7^{7}	3
(Sweden) J Björkman	3	6	6	6^{3}	6

=== Section 5 ===
First round
6	(United States) M Chang	6	6	6
(Russia) A Cherkasov	4	2	2
(United States) M Washington	6^{5}	6	3	6	6
(Germany) K Braasch	7^{7}	3	6	3	3
(Sweden) M Larsson	7^{7}	7	3	3	3
WC	(United States) J Grabb	6^{2}	5	6	6	6
Q	(South Africa) E Ferreira	7^{7}	6	6
(France) A Boetsch	6^{3}	4	4
Q	(Sweden) R Eriksson	3	2	0
(United States) A Agassi	6	6	6
(France) G Forget	7	6	6
WC	(Sweden) M Wilander	5	1	4
Q	(Chile) M Ríos	6	7^{7}	6
(United States) J Palmer	2	6^{1}	2
WC	(United States) W McGuire	5	2	2
12	(South Africa) W Ferreira	7	6	6

Second round
6	(United States) M Chang	4	6	6	7^{7}
(United States) M Washington	6	2	3	6^{3}
WC	(United States) J Grabb	4	6	6	6
Q	(South Africa) E Ferreira	6	4	2	3
(United States) A Agassi	6	7	6^{5}	6
(France) G Forget	3	5	7^{7}	2
Q	(Chile) M Ríos	4	2	4
12	(South Africa) W Ferreira	6	6	6

Third round
6	(United States) M Chang	6	4
WC	(United States) J Grabb	1	1	r
(United States) A Agassi	7	6	7
12	(South Africa) W Ferreira	5	1	5

Fourth round
6	(United States) M Chang	1	7^{7}	3	6	1
(United States) A Agassi	6	6^{3}	6	3	6

=== Section 6 ===
First round
13	(Austria) T Muster	6	6	6
Q	(Italy) D Musa	3	2	0
(Venezuela) M Ruah	6^{3}	7^{7}	6	2	6
(United Kingdom) J Bates	7^{7}	6^{5}	4	6	4
(Sweden) T Enqvist	4	6	6	6^{5}	6
(Spain) À Corretja	6	3	4	7^{7}	1
(Sweden) J Svensson	4	4	2
(Germany) H Dreekmann	6	6	6
(New Zealand) B Steven	6^{5}	4	6	1
(Germany) M-K Goellner	7^{7}	6	3	6
(Austria) A Antonitsch	6	7^{7}	6^{7}	2	3
(Spain) T Carbonell	1	6^{0}	7^{9}	6	6
(Australia) J Stoltenberg	6	6	4	3	4
(Russia) A Olhovskiy	1	4	6	6	6
(United States) B Shelton	0	2	5
3	(Spain) S Bruguera	6	6	7

Second round
13	(Austria) T Muster	6	4	6	6
(Venezuela) M Ruah	4	6	4	2
(Sweden) T Enqvist	7^{7}	7^{7}	6^{4}	7
(Germany) H Dreekmann	6^{4}	6^{2}	7^{7}	5
(Germany) M-K Goellner	7^{7}	3
(Spain) T Carbonell	6^{4}	2	r
(Russia) A Olhovskiy	5	2	6^{5}
3	(Spain) S Bruguera	7	6	7^{7}

Third round
13	(Austria) T Muster	6	6	6
(Sweden) T Enqvist	0	4	2
(Germany) M-K Goellner	6	4	2	7^{7}	1
3	(Spain) S Bruguera	1	6	6	6^{4}	6

Fourth round
13	(Austria) T Muster	6	7^{7}	6
3	(Spain) S Bruguera	4	6^{4}	4

=== Section 7 ===
First round
7	(Germany) B Becker	1	4	6	6	6^{5}
(United States) R Reneberg	6	6	4	1	7^{7}
(Spain) J Burillo	6	7^{7}	6^{1}	6
(Denmark) K Carlsen	3	6^{4}	7^{7}	4
(United States) D Wheaton	6	4	2	6	3
(Australia) R Fromberg	4	6	6	3	6
WC	(United States) P Goldstein	4	3	4
(Haiti) R Agénor	6	6	6
(Czech Republic) D Rikl	4	1	4
(Australia) P Rafter	6	6	6
(Sweden) J Apell	3	6	6	6
(Italy) S Pescosolido	6	3	4	4
(Russia) A Chesnokov	6	2	7^{7}	6
(Spain) J Sánchez	3	6	6^{2}	2
(France) G Raoux	7^{7}	6	3	4	6^{1}
9	(United States) T Martin	6^{4}	4	6	6	7^{7}

Second round
(United States) R Reneberg	6	7	6
(Spain) J Burillo	3	5	3
(Australia) R Fromberg	6	6	6
(Haiti) R Agénor	3	3	4
(Australia) P Rafter	7	4	7^{12}	6
(Sweden) J Apell	5	6	6^{10}	3
(Russia) A Chesnokov	3	2	5
9	(United States) T Martin	6	6	7

Third round
(United States) R Reneberg	2	6	7^{7}	6
(Australia) R Fromberg	6	1	6^{4}	2
(Australia) P Rafter	5	3	7^{7}	2
9	(United States) T Martin	7	6	6^{3}	6

Fourth round
(United States) R Reneberg	6	0	r
9	(United States) T Martin	3	3

=== Section 8 ===
First round
15	(Switzerland) M Rosset	4	1	6	7^{7}	6
(Australia) M Woodforde	6	6	3	6^{5}	3
(Sweden) N Kulti	7^{7}	2	3	6	6
(United States) C Adams	6^{2}	6	6	4	4
Q	(India) L Paes	4	4	2
(Germany) B Karbacher	6	6	6
(United States) I Lendl	7	6	6
Q	(Australia) N Borwick	5	2	3
Q	(Italy) G Pozzi	6	6	6
(Italy) R Furlan	2	4	4
(Israel) A Mansdorf	6	6	3	6
(Spain) E Sánchez	4	4	6	3
Q	(Australia) G Doyle	6	2	3	3
(United States) R Weiss	4	6	6	6
(Germany) M Zoecke	6	7	3	7
2	(Croatia) G Ivanišević	2	5	6	5

Second round
15	(Switzerland) M Rosset	6	6	6^{2}	6
(Sweden) N Kulti	4	2	7^{7}	2
(Germany) B Karbacher	6	7^{7}	1
(United States) I Lendl	4	6^{5}	0	r
Q	(Italy) G Pozzi	4	7	3	7	6
(Israel) A Mansdorf	6	5	6	5	3
(United States) R Weiss	1	5	2
(Germany) M Zoecke	6	7	6

Third round
15	(Switzerland) M Rosset	6	4	6	1	2
(Germany) B Karbacher	4	6	4	6	6
Q	(Italy) G Pozzi	2	6	6	6
(Germany) M Zoecke	6	4	2	2

Fourth round
(Germany) B Karbacher	6	4	6	6
Q	(Italy) G Pozzi	2	6	3	4

Preceded by 1994 Wimbledon Championships – Men's singles	Grand Slam men's singles	Succeeded by 1995 Australian Open – Men's singles
