= Brent Larkham =

Australian tennis player

- Country (sports): Australia
- Born: 8 January 1972 (age 53); Canberra
- Height: 1.78 m (5 ft 10 in)
- Plays: Right-handed
- Prize money: $144,612

Singles
- Career record: 4–9
- Career titles: 0
- Highest ranking: No. 108 (26 Sep 1994)

Grand Slam singles results
- Australian Open: 3R (1994)
- French Open: 1R (1994)

Doubles
- Career record: 3–10
- Career titles: 0
- Highest ranking: No. 128 (30 Oct 1995

Grand Slam doubles results
- Australian Open: 1R (1994, 1995, 1996)
- Wimbledon: 1R (1994)

Brent Larkham (born 8 January 1972) is a former professional tennis player from Australia. He is the elder brother of Todd Larkham, who also played professional tennis.

== Career ==
Larkham had the best performance of his career at the 1994 Australian Open, where he made a surprise run to the third round, as a wildcard. He won his opening match against Japanese qualifier Ryuso Tsujino in straight sets and also didn't drop a set in his second round meeting with 27th ranked Amos Mansdorf. In the third round he played Martin Damm but couldn't beat the Czech, losing in four sets.

Also in 1994, Larkham made the second round of the Stella Artois Championships (Queen's), with a win over Patrick McEnroe, who was then ranked 66 in the world. He was then eliminated by Stefan Edberg.

After retiring, due to a back injury, Larkham spent some time coaching his brother Todd and has also worked with Wayne Arthurs, Richard Fromberg and Paul Hanley. He is now head coach of the tennis program at the Australian Institute of Sports in Canberra.

== Challenger titles ==
=== Singles: (2) ===
No.	Year	Tournament	Surface	Opponent	Score
1.	1993	Launceston, Australia	Carpet	(Sweden) Nicklas Utgren	6–3, 4–6, 7–6
2.	1994	Tampere, Finland	Clay	(Spain) Alejo Mancisidor	7–6, 1–6, 6–3

=== Doubles: (3) ===
No.	Year	Tournament	Surface	Partner	Opponents	Score
1.	1992	Bristol, UK	Grass	(United Kingdom) Darren Kirk	(United States) Kent Kinnear (Sweden) Peter Nyborg	3–6, 7–6, 6–4
2.	1993	Perth, Australia	Grass	(Australia) Paul Kilderry	(Australia) Ben Ellwood (Australia) Mark Philippoussis	7–6, 6–3
3.	1995	Fürth, Germany	Clay	(Australia) Andrew Kratzmann	(United States) Ken Flach (United States) Kent Kinnear	6–4, 6–7, 7–6
