= Chris Garner (tennis) =

American tennis player

- Country (sports): United States
- Born: April 7, 1969 (age 56) Bellefonte, Pennsylvania
- Height: 5 ft 11 in (180 cm)
- Plays: Right-handed
- Prize money: $242,281

Singles
- Career record: 23–39
- Highest ranking: No. 120 (August 26, 1991)

Grand Slam singles results
- Australian Open: 4R (1993)
- US Open: 1R (1990)

Doubles
- Career record: 1–5
- Highest ranking: No. 336 (February 12, 1990)

Grand Slam doubles results
- US Open: 1R (1985)

Chris Garner (born April 7, 1969) is an American former tennis player.

Born in Bellefonte, Pennsylvania, Garner was the number one junior tennis player in multiple age categories, winning the U.S. National 16 and under Championship in 1984. Garner played one year of college tennis where he was an All-American at the University of Georgia before turning professional in 1988. Although he did not win any titles (singles and/or doubles) during his professional career, he scored wins over world #1 players Andre Agassi, Yevgeny Kafelnikov and Pat Rafter. Garner, a right-hander, reached his highest individual ranking on the ATP Tour on August 26, 1991, when he became the world No. 120.

While on tour, Garner resided in Bay Shore, New York.

Garner currently is the head coach of the U.S. Naval Academy men's tennis team. Previously, he was head coach at Amherst College.
