= Keith Evans =

American tennis player

- Country (sports): United States
- Born: March 22, 1969 (age 55); Memphis, Tennessee
- Height: 6 ft 2 in (188 cm)
- Prize money: $62,148

Singles
- Career record: 2–7
- Highest ranking: No. 195 (September 27, 1993)

Doubles
- Career record: 3–5
- Highest ranking: No. 228 (February 24, 1992)

Keith Evans (born March 22, 1969) is a former professional tennis player from the United States.

Evans had a highest ATP singles ranking of 195 in the world. He had victories over world Patrick Rafter, Alberto Mancini, Greg Rusedski, and a win over Bob/Mike Bryan in doubles.

Evans now runs a tennis academy, the KE Tennis Academy, in the USA.
