= Louis Gloria =

American tennis player

- Country (sports): United States
- Residence: Orange, Connecticut
- Born: April 15, 1969 (age 55); New Haven, Connecticut
- Height: 5 ft 9 in (1.75 m)
- Turned pro: 1991
- Plays: Left-handed
- Prize money: $158,068

Singles
- Career record: 5–19
- Career titles: 0
- Highest ranking: No. 177 (November 14, 1994)

Grand Slam singles results
- Wimbledon: 2R (1995)

Doubles
- Career record: 1-4
- Career titles: 0
- Highest ranking: No. 349 (October 11, 1993)

Louis "Lou" Gloria (born April 15, 1969) is a former professional tennis player from the United States.

== Career ==
Gloria played collegiate tennis for the University of South Carolina and was an All-American in 1991.

He won the Brunei Challenger tournament in 1992, which would remain his only Challenger title.

In 1994, Gloria had his best year on the ATP Tour, making the second round of three tournaments, the Lipton Championships, EA Generali Open and the Japan Open.

His only Grand Slam main draw appearance came at the 1995 Wimbledon Championships, where he defeated German Jörn Renzenbrink in a five-set opening round match. He lost in the second round to Alexander Volkov of Russia, also in five sets.

== Challenger titles ==
=== Singles: (1) ===
No.	Year	Tournament	Surface	Opponent	Score
1.	1992	Brunei	Hard	(Canada) Daniel Nestor	6–3, 2–6, 6–2
