= 1995 Australian Open – Men's singles qualifying =

Men's singles qualifying
- 1995 Australian Open

Events
Singles	men	women		boys	girls
Doubles	men	women	mixed	boys	girls
WC Singles	men	women	quad
WC Doubles	men	women	quad
Legends	men	women	mixed

Qualification
Singles	men	women
- Australian Open

This article displays the qualifying draw for men's singles at the 1995 Australian Open.

== Seeds ==
1. (Sweden) Mikael Tillström (second round)
2. (United States) Robbie Weiss (second round)
3. (France) Thierry Guardiola (qualified)
4. (United States) Tommy Ho (qualified)
5. (The Bahamas) Roger Smith (second round)
6. (Canada) Daniel Nestor (qualified)
7. (United States) Wade McGuire (second round)
8. (Mexico) Óscar Ortiz (second round)
9. (South Africa) David Nainkin (qualifying competition)
10. (Romania) Adrian Voinea (qualified)
11. (China) Pan Bing (second round)
12. (Morocco) Hicham Arazi (first round)
13. (United States) Louis Gloria (first round)
14. (Slovakia) Ján Krošlák (qualified)
15. (Colombia) Mario Rincón (second round)
16. (Egypt) Tamer El-Sawy (second round)
17. (Germany) Lars Burgsmüller (qualified)
18. (South Africa) Grant Stafford (qualified)
19. (France) Jérôme Golmard (qualified)
20. (Netherlands) Hendrik Jan Davids (qualifying competition)
21. (France) Frederic Vitoux (first round)
22. (Germany) Carsten Arriens (second round)
23. (United States) Kenny Thorne (qualified)
24. (South Africa) Kevin Ullyett (qualifying competition)
25. (The Bahamas) Mark Knowles (qualifying competition)
26. (South Africa) Mark Kaplan (second round)
27. (Australia) Neil Borwick (qualifying competition)
28. (United Kingdom) Gary Henderson (first round)
29. (Ivory Coast) Claude N'Goran (first round)
30. (South Africa) Ellis Ferreira (qualifying competition)
31. (Sweden) Lars-Anders Wahlgren (first round)
32. (Australia) Grant Doyle (qualified)

== Qualifiers ==
1. (Australia) Grant Doyle
2. (South Africa) Clinton Marsh
3. (France) Thierry Guardiola
4. (United States) Tommy Ho
5. (Australia) Ashley Naumann
6. (Canada) Daniel Nestor
7. (United States) Brian MacPhie
8. (Zimbabwe) Wayne Black
9. (United States) Kenny Thorne
10. (Romania) Adrian Voinea
11. (United States) Luke Jensen
12. (United States) Steve Campbell
13. (France) Jérôme Golmard
14. (Slovakia) Ján Krošlák
15. (Germany) Lars Burgsmüller
16. (South Africa) Grant Stafford

== Qualifying draw ==
Key

- Q = Qualifier
- WC = Wild card
- LL = Lucky loser
- Alt = Alternate
- ITF = ITF entry
- PR = Protected ranking
- SR = Special ranking
- SE = Special exempt
- JE = Junior exempt
- JR = Junior Accelerator Programme entrant
- CO = College Accelerator Programme entrant
- NG = Next Gen Accelerator Program entrant
- w/o = Walkover
- r = Retired
- d = Defaulted

=== First qualifier ===
First round
(Germany) Björn Jacob	4	6	9
(South Korea) Lee Sang-hoon	6	1	7
(United States) Dave Randall	3	6	5
(Australia) James Holmes	6	2	7
(France) Gilles Bastié	2	2
32	(Australia) Grant Doyle	6	6

Second round
1	(Sweden) Mikael Tillström	6	1	3
(Germany) Björn Jacob	1	6	6
(Australia) James Holmes	4	6^{4}
32	(Australia) Grant Doyle	6	7^{7}

Qualifying competition
(Germany) Björn Jacob	2	4
32	(Australia) Grant Doyle	6	6

=== Second qualifier ===
First round
(South Africa) Clinton Marsh	6	6
(Netherlands) Menno Oosting	2	3
(Australia) Todd Larkham	6	6
(Australia) Jurek Stasiak	2	1
(United States) Kip Brady	6	7^{7}
31	(Sweden) Lars-Anders Wahlgren	1	6^{5}

Second round
2	(United States) Robbie Weiss	6	4	4
(South Africa) Clinton Marsh	3	6	6
(Australia) Todd Larkham	4	6	6
(United States) Kip Brady	6	1	3

Qualifying competition
(South Africa) Clinton Marsh	7	7^{7}
(Australia) Todd Larkham	5	6^{5}

=== Third qualifier ===
First round
3	(France) Thierry Guardiola	6^{3}	6	6
(United Kingdom) Miles Maclagan	7^{7}	3	3
(Australia) Wayne Arthurs	7	6
(Australia) Mahyar Goodarz	5	4
WC	(Australia) Scott Graham	3	5
(South Africa) Neville Godwin	6	7
(Slovakia) Branislav Stankovič	7^{7}	6
29	(Ivory Coast) Claude N'Goran	6^{3}	2

Second round
3	(France) Thierry Guardiola	7^{7}	6
(Australia) Wayne Arthurs	6^{2}	3
(South Africa) Neville Godwin	6	6
(Slovakia) Branislav Stankovič	2	0

Qualifying competition
3	(France) Thierry Guardiola	6	7^{7}
(South Africa) Neville Godwin	0	6^{0}

=== Fourth qualifier ===
First round
4	(United States) Tommy Ho	6^{6}	6	6
(Germany) Burkhard Scholz	7^{8}	0	3
(Australia) Patrick Crowe	6^{5}	2
(Germany) Christian Vinck	7^{7}	6
(Germany) Jörg Schors	6	6
(Australia) Andrew Bates	2	2
(Germany) Sascha Bandermann	6	6^{3}	1
30	(South Africa) Ellis Ferreira	4	7^{7}	6

Second round
4	(United States) Tommy Ho	6	6
(Germany) Christian Vinck	4	4
(Germany) Jörg Schors	4	1
30	(South Africa) Ellis Ferreira	6	6

Qualifying competition
4	(United States) Tommy Ho	6	6
30	(South Africa) Ellis Ferreira	2	3

=== Fifth qualifier ===
First round
5	(The Bahamas) Roger Smith	6	7^{10}
(United States) Donny Isaak	2	6^{8}
(United States) Dennis Schmid	6^{3}	6^{7}
(Australia) Ashley Naumann	7^{7}	7^{9}
(United States) Brett Dickinson	6	3	6
(United Kingdom) Jamie Delgado	3	6	4
(Sweden) Mathias Hellström	6	6
28	(United Kingdom) Gary Henderson	1	2

Second round
5	(The Bahamas) Roger Smith	3	6	3
(Australia) Ashley Naumann	6	4	6
(United States) Brett Dickinson	7^{8}	5	6
(Sweden) Mathias Hellström	6^{6}	7	3

Qualifying competition
(Australia) Ashley Naumann	5	6	6
(United States) Brett Dickinson	7	2	4

=== Sixth qualifier ===
First round
6	(Canada) Daniel Nestor	3	6	6
(United States) Kelly Jones	6	4	4
(France) Stéphane Matheu	6	6^{5}	6
WC	(Australia) Tane Rakete	2	7^{7}	3
(United States) Stephen Herdoiza	7	5	6
(United States) Ari Nathan	5	7	3
(Sweden) Fredrik Jonsson	4	4
27	(Australia) Neil Borwick	6	6

Second round
6	(Canada) Daniel Nestor	6	6
(France) Stéphane Matheu	2	2
(United States) Stephen Herdoiza	6	4	3
27	(Australia) Neil Borwick	4	6	6

Qualifying competition
6	(Canada) Daniel Nestor	6	7
27	(Australia) Neil Borwick	3	5

=== Seventh qualifier ===
First round
7	(United States) Wade McGuire	5	6	6
(Sweden) Nicklas Utgren	7	3	3
(United States) Kent Kinnear	3	4
(Australia) John Fitzgerald	6	6
(United States) Jack Waite	3	1
(United States) Brian MacPhie	6	6
(Italy) Stefano Cobolli	3	1
26	(South Africa) Mark Kaplan	6	6

Second round
7	(United States) Wade McGuire	2^{r}
(Australia) John Fitzgerald	4
(United States) Brian MacPhie	7^{7}	4	6
26	(South Africa) Mark Kaplan	6^{4}	6	2

Qualifying competition
(Australia) John Fitzgerald	1	6^{5}
(United States) Brian MacPhie	6	7^{7}

=== Eighth qualifier ===
First round
8	(Mexico) Óscar Ortiz	7^{7}	6
(South Africa) Clinton Ferreira	6^{5}	3
(Zimbabwe) Wayne Black	6	6
(Australia) Joseph Sirianni	2	1
(South Korea) Yoon Yong-il	6	6
(Australia) Cameron Liggett	1	3
(Mexico) Alejandro Hernández	2	4
25	(The Bahamas) Mark Knowles	6	6

Second round
8	(Mexico) Óscar Ortiz	4	0
(Zimbabwe) Wayne Black	6	6
(South Korea) Yoon Yong-il	4	6	2
25	(The Bahamas) Mark Knowles	6	2	6

Qualifying competition
(Zimbabwe) Wayne Black	6	6^{4}	9
25	(The Bahamas) Mark Knowles	1	7^{7}	7

=== Ninth qualifier ===
First round
9	(South Africa) David Nainkin	6	6
WC	(Australia) Andrew McLean	1	2
(Australia) Andrew Florent	6	7
(Japan) Toshitsugu Mori	4	5
WC	(Australia) Chris Browne	2	3
(Australia) Leigh Holland	6	6
(Australia) Joshua Eagle	4	6	5
23	(United States) Kenny Thorne	6	2	7

Second round
9	(South Africa) David Nainkin	6	6
(Australia) Andrew Florent	3	2
(Australia) Leigh Holland	3	2
23	(United States) Kenny Thorne	6	6

Qualifying competition
9	(South Africa) David Nainkin	4	2
23	(United States) Kenny Thorne	6	6

=== Tenth qualifier ===
First round
10	(Romania) Adrian Voinea	1	6	6
(United States) Donald Johnson	6	2	2
(United States) Rick Leach	6	7
(Australia) Jay Salter	2	5
(France) Daniel Courcol	7^{9}	6
(Australia) Steven Randjelovic	6^{7}	1
WC	(Australia) Wojtek Stasiak	5	0
24	(South Africa) Kevin Ullyett	7	6

Second round
10	(Romania) Adrian Voinea	6	7^{7}
(United States) Rick Leach	3	6^{4}
(France) Daniel Courcol	6^{4}	7	3
24	(South Africa) Kevin Ullyett	7^{7}	5	6

Qualifying competition
10	(Romania) Adrian Voinea	6	3	7
24	(South Africa) Kevin Ullyett	2	6	5

=== Eleventh qualifier ===
First round
11	(China) Pan Bing	7^{7}	7
(Australia) Johan Anderson	6^{4}	5
(Australia) Bradley Sceney	6^{4}	2
(United States) Luke Jensen	7^{7}	6
(Czech Republic) Libor Němeček	7^{7}	6
(Netherlands) Tom Kempers	6^{2}	4
(Australia) Stephen Gleeson	2	1
22	(Germany) Carsten Arriens	6	6

Second round
11	(China) Pan Bing	1	4
(United States) Luke Jensen	6	6
(Czech Republic) Libor Němeček	2	7	6
22	(Germany) Carsten Arriens	6	5	4

Qualifying competition
(United States) Luke Jensen	6	4	6
(Czech Republic) Libor Němeček	4	6	0

=== Twelfth qualifier ===
First round
12	(Morocco) Hicham Arazi	w/o
(Latvia) Armand Strombach
(United States) Francisco Montana	6	6
(Germany) Arnd Caspari	3	0
(United States) Steve Campbell	6	6
(Australia) Allen Belobrajdic	2	4
(United States) David Pate	6	6
21	(France) Frederic Vitoux	3	1

Second round
(Latvia) Armand Strombach	6	5	0
(United States) Francisco Montana	3	7	6
(United States) Steve Campbell	7^{7}	6
(United States) David Pate	6^{5}	4

Qualifying competition
(United States) Francisco Montana	4	1
(United States) Steve Campbell	6	6

=== Thirteenth qualifier ===
First round
13	(United States) Louis Gloria	1	7	2
(Sweden) Ola Kristiansson	6	5	6
(Australia) James Sekulov	5	2
(Mexico) Ignacio Martínez	7	6
(Malaysia) Adam Malik	2	6	5
(Australia) Peter Tramacchi	6	2	7
WC	(Australia) Syed-Akram Zaman	0	1
19	(France) Jérôme Golmard	6	6

Second round
(Sweden) Ola Kristiansson	4	6	6
(Mexico) Ignacio Martínez	6	4	2
(Australia) Peter Tramacchi	5	7^{8}	2
19	(France) Jérôme Golmard	7	6^{6}	6

Qualifying competition
(Sweden) Ola Kristiansson	2	1
19	(France) Jérôme Golmard	6	6

=== Fourteenth qualifier ===
First round
14	(Slovakia) Ján Krošlák	6	6
(Federal Republic of Yugoslavia) Bojan Vujić	2	3
(Austria) Rainer Falenti	2	2
(Greece) Anastasios Vasiliadis	6	6
(South Korea) Song Hyeong-keun	3	2
(South Africa) Byron Talbot	6	6
(Canada) Jocelyn Robichaud	2	2
20	(Netherlands) Hendrik Jan Davids	6	6

Second round
14	(Slovakia) Ján Krošlák	6	6
(Greece) Anastasios Vasiliadis	1	2
(South Africa) Byron Talbot	2	4
20	(Netherlands) Hendrik Jan Davids	6	6

Qualifying competition
14	(Slovakia) Ján Krošlák	7^{7}	3	7
20	(Netherlands) Hendrik Jan Davids	6^{3}	6	5

=== Fifteenth qualifier ===
First round
15	(Colombia) Mario Rincón	6	6
(United States) Tom Mercer	3	2
(United States) Murphy Jensen	3	2
(Nigeria) Sulieman Ladipo	6	6
(Australia) Michael Brown	1	4
(Australia) Andrew Kratzmann	6	6
(United Kingdom) Ross Matheson	2	4
17	(Germany) Lars Burgsmüller	6	6

Second round
15	(Colombia) Mario Rincón	6	6^{6}	5
(Nigeria) Sulieman Ladipo	4	7^{8}	7
(Australia) Andrew Kratzmann	5	2
17	(Germany) Lars Burgsmüller	7	6

Qualifying competition
(Nigeria) Sulieman Ladipo	1	1
17	(Germany) Lars Burgsmüller	6	6

=== Sixteenth qualifier ===
First round
16	(Egypt) Tamer El-Sawy	6	6^{5}	6
(Netherlands) Tom Nijssen	1	7^{7}	3
(Japan) Daiji Morii	2	6	1
(Australia) Andrew Painter	6	2	6
(Australia) Jon Ireland	7	6^{5}	3
WC	(Australia) Dejan Petrović	5	7^{7}	6
(Australia) Mark Draper	1	1
18	(South Africa) Grant Stafford	6	6

Second round
16	(Egypt) Tamer El-Sawy	6^{7}	3
(Australia) Andrew Painter	7^{9}	6
WC	(Australia) Dejan Petrović	1	1
18	(South Africa) Grant Stafford	6	6

Qualifying competition
(Australia) Andrew Painter	2	1
18	(South Africa) Grant Stafford	6	6
