= 1996 Australian Open – Men's singles qualifying =

Men's singles qualifying
- 1996 Australian Open

Events
Singles	men	women		boys	girls
Doubles	men	women	mixed	boys	girls
WC Singles	men	women	quad
WC Doubles	men	women	quad
Legends	men	women	mixed

Qualification
Singles	men	women
- Australian Open

This article displays the qualifying draw for men's singles at the 1996 Australian Open.

== Seeds ==
1. (Venezuela) Nicolás Pereira (second round)
2. (United States) Steve Campbell (second round)
3. (United States) Tommy Ho (second round)
4. (Germany) Patrick Baur (second round)
5. (Argentina) Gastón Etlis (qualified)
6. (Canada) Sébastien Lareau (qualified)
7. (Morocco) Hicham Arazi (first round)
8. (Italy) Cristiano Caratti (second round)
9. (The Bahamas) Mark Knowles (first round)
10. (France) Rodolphe Gilbert (qualified)
11. (Germany) Carsten Arriens (second round)
12. (Germany) Jörn Renzenbrink (first round)
13. (Sweden) Nicklas Kulti (qualified)
14. (United States) Bryan Shelton (first round)
15. (France) Thierry Guardiola (qualified)
16. (France) Jean-Philippe Fleurian (qualified)
17. (Israel) Eyal Ran (qualifying competition, lucky loser)
18. (Canada) Albert Chang (second round)
19. (Germany) Lars Burgsmüller (second round)
20. (Netherlands) Joost Winnink (first round)
21. (Sweden) Magnus Norman (qualified)
22. (Germany) Nicolas Kiefer (qualified)
23. (South Africa) David Nainkin (qualified)
24. (Germany) Lars Rehmann (second round)
25. (Canada) Daniel Nestor (qualified)
26. (Sweden) Lars Jonsson (qualifying competition, lucky loser)
27. (France) Daniel Courcol (second round)
28. (Italy) Diego Nargiso (qualifying competition, lucky loser)
29. (Russia) Andrey Cherkasov (qualified)
30. (Mexico) Oscar Ortiz (second round)
31. (Germany) Patrik Kühnen (second round)
32. (Zimbabwe) Wayne Black (qualifying competition)

== Qualifiers ==
1. (Sweden) Patrik Fredriksson
2. (Australia) Heath Denman
3. (Russia) Andrey Cherkasov
4. (South Africa) David Adams
5. (Argentina) Gastón Etlis
6. (Canada) Sébastien Lareau
7. (United States) Steve Bryan
8. (Canada) Daniel Nestor
9. (South Africa) David Nainkin
10. (France) Rodolphe Gilbert
11. (Germany) Nicolas Kiefer
12. (Sweden) Magnus Norman
13. (Sweden) Nicklas Kulti
14. (United States) Brian MacPhie
15. (France) Thierry Guardiola
16. (France) Jean-Philippe Fleurian

== Lucky losers ==
1. (Israel) Eyal Ran
2. (Italy) Diego Nargiso
3. (Sweden) Lars Jonsson

== Qualifying draw ==
Key

- Q = Qualifier
- WC = Wild card
- LL = Lucky loser
- Alt = Alternate
- ITF = ITF entry
- PR = Protected ranking
- SR = Special ranking
- SE = Special exempt
- JE = Junior exempt
- JR = Junior Accelerator Programme entrant
- CO = College Accelerator Programme entrant
- NG = Next Gen Accelerator Program entrant
- w/o = Walkover
- r = Retired
- d = Defaulted

=== First qualifier ===
First round
1	(Venezuela) Nicolás Pereira	6	4	8
(United States) Louis Gloria	4	6	6
(Sweden) Patrik Fredriksson	6	6^{7}	6
(South Korea) Lee Hyung-taik	4	7^{9}	2
(France) Grégory Carraz	7^{7}	7^{8}
(Mexico) Luis Herrera	6^{4}	6^{6}
(United States) Kip Brady	4	4
32	(Zimbabwe) Wayne Black	6	6

Second round
1	(Venezuela) Nicolás Pereira	3	2
(Sweden) Patrik Fredriksson	6	6
(France) Grégory Carraz	6	5	4
32	(Zimbabwe) Wayne Black	3	7	6

Qualifying competition
(Sweden) Patrik Fredriksson	6	6
32	(Zimbabwe) Wayne Black	1	4

=== Second qualifier ===
First round
2	(United States) Steve Campbell	6	6
(United Kingdom) Andrew Richardson	2	3
(Australia) Heath Denman	6	6
WC	(Australia) Wojtek Stasiak	4	1
(South Africa) Grant Stafford	6	6
(Egypt) Tamer El-Sawy	4	2
(Austria) Udo Plamberger	2	1
31	(Germany) Patrik Kühnen	6	6

Second round
2	(United States) Steve Campbell	2	1
(Australia) Heath Denman	6	6
(South Africa) Grant Stafford	6	6
31	(Germany) Patrik Kühnen	3	4

Qualifying competition
(Australia) Heath Denman	7^{7}	7^{7}
(South Africa) Grant Stafford	6^{1}	6^{4}

=== Third qualifier ===
First round
3	(United States) Tommy Ho	6	6
(Sweden) Mårten Renström	2	3
(Romania) Andrei Pavel	6	0^{r}
(South Korea) Yoon Yong-il	4	2
(Canada) Sébastien Leblanc	4	0
(Bulgaria) Orlin Stanoytchev	6	6
(South Africa) Michael De Jongh	0	2
29	(Russia) Andrey Cherkasov	6	6

Second round
3	(United States) Tommy Ho	7^{7}	2	5
(South Korea) Yoon Yong-il	6^{0}	6	7
(Bulgaria) Orlin Stanoytchev	2	3
29	(Russia) Andrey Cherkasov	6	6

Qualifying competition
(South Korea) Yoon Yong-il	1	6^{5}
29	(Russia) Andrey Cherkasov	6	7^{7}

=== Fourth qualifier ===
First round
4	(Germany) Patrick Baur	7^{7}	4	6
(The Bahamas) Roger Smith	6^{3}	6	4
(Australia) Brent Larkham	6	2	6
(South Africa) Neville Godwin	4	6	8
(Australia) Mark Draper	4	7	10
(South Africa) David Adams	6	5	12
(Nigeria) Sulieman Ladipo	6^{5r}
30	(Mexico) Oscar Ortiz	7^{7}

Second round
4	(Germany) Patrick Baur	6	2	4
(South Africa) Neville Godwin	0	6	6
(South Africa) David Adams	6	6
30	(Mexico) Oscar Ortiz	4	1

Qualifying competition
(South Africa) Neville Godwin	4	5
(South Africa) David Adams	6	7

=== Fifth qualifier ===
First round
5	(Argentina) Gastón Etlis	6	6
(Germany) Christian Vinck	2	4
WC	(Australia) Sebastien Swierk	6	7
WC	(Australia) Sergio Gaoni	1	5
(Mexico) Alejandro Hernandez	6	6
WC	(Australia) Dejan Petrović	2	2
(Romania) Răzvan Sabău	5	1
27	(France) Daniel Courcol	7	6

Second round
5	(Argentina) Gastón Etlis	6	1	6
WC	(Australia) Sebastien Swierk	4	6	3
(Mexico) Alejandro Hernandez	6	7^{12}
27	(France) Daniel Courcol	2	6^{10}

Qualifying competition
5	(Argentina) Gastón Etlis	6	7
(Mexico) Alejandro Hernandez	3	5

=== Sixth qualifier ===
First round
6	(Canada) Sébastien Lareau	7	6
(Austria) Horst Skoff	5	1
(Australia) James Holmes	7	3	4
WC	(Australia) Andrew Kratzmann	5	6	6
(Canada) Jocelyn Robichaud	3	6^{3}
WC	(Australia) Jaymon Crabb	6	7^{7}
(United Kingdom) Danny Sapsford	3	4
28	(Italy) Diego Nargiso	6	6

Second round
6	(Canada) Sébastien Lareau	5	6	6
WC	(Australia) Andrew Kratzmann	7	2	3
WC	(Australia) Jaymon Crabb	1	6^{4}
28	(Italy) Diego Nargiso	6	7^{7}

Qualifying competition
6	(Canada) Sébastien Lareau	7^{7}	6
28	(Italy) Diego Nargiso	6^{4}	1

=== Seventh qualifier ===
First round
7	(Morocco) Hicham Arazi	4	6	3
(New Zealand) Steven Downs	6	3	6
(United States) Steve Bryan	6	6
(Croatia) Igor Šarić	2	1
(Japan) Kotaro Miyachi	4	4
(Germany) Björn Jacob	6	6
(United States) Stephen Herdoiza	0	6	4
26	(Sweden) Lars Jonsson	6	4	6

Second round
(New Zealand) Steven Downs	3	1
(United States) Steve Bryan	6	6
(Germany) Björn Jacob	2	6	3
26	(Sweden) Lars Jonsson	6	2	6

Qualifying competition
(United States) Steve Bryan	6	6
26	(Sweden) Lars Jonsson	3	3

=== Eighth qualifier ===
First round
8	(Italy) Cristiano Caratti	6	6
(Mexico) Leonardo Lavalle	3	3
(United States) Jan-Michael Gambill	7	6
WC	(Australia) Andrew Florent	5	1
(Netherlands) Fernon Wibier	6^{6}	7	6
(China) Pan Bing	7^{8}	5	1
(Australia) Leigh Holland	1	6	1
25	(Canada) Daniel Nestor	6	3	6

Second round
8	(Italy) Cristiano Caratti	6^{8}	6	1
(United States) Jan-Michael Gambill	7^{10}	1	6
(Netherlands) Fernon Wibier	4	3
25	(Canada) Daniel Nestor	6	6

Qualifying competition
(United States) Jan-Michael Gambill	7	5	1
25	(Canada) Daniel Nestor	5	7	6

=== Ninth qualifier ===
First round
9	(The Bahamas) Mark Knowles	6^{4}	4
(Japan) Yasufumi Yamamoto	7^{7}	6
(Australia) Mahyar Goodarz	6	7^{9}
(New Zealand) Alistair Hunt	2	6^{7}
(Netherlands) Stephen Noteboom	6	2	7
(Sweden) Lars-Anders Wahlgren	3	6	5
(United States) Donald Johnson	6	1	4
23	(South Africa) David Nainkin	3	6	6

Second round
(Japan) Yasufumi Yamamoto	4	7^{7}	6
(Australia) Mahyar Goodarz	6	6^{3}	1
(Netherlands) Stephen Noteboom	6	4	1
23	(South Africa) David Nainkin	2	6	6

Qualifying competition
(Japan) Yasufumi Yamamoto	2	6^{6}
23	(South Africa) David Nainkin	6	7^{8}

=== Tenth qualifier ===
First round
10	(France) Rodolphe Gilbert	7	6
(South Korea) Song Hyeong-keun	5	2
(North Macedonia) Aleksandar Kitinov	6	6^{4}	4
(United States) T. J. Middleton	3	7^{7}	6
(Netherlands) Martijn Bok	6	6
(South Africa) Chris Haggard	4	3
(Indonesia) Lin Bing-chao	7	4	4
24	(Germany) Lars Rehmann	5	6	6

Second round
10	(France) Rodolphe Gilbert	6	7^{7}
(United States) T. J. Middleton	4	6^{2}
(Netherlands) Martijn Bok	4	7^{7}	9
24	(Germany) Lars Rehmann	6	6^{1}	7

Qualifying competition
10	(France) Rodolphe Gilbert	6	6
(Netherlands) Martijn Bok	1	4

=== Eleventh qualifier ===
First round
11	(Germany) Carsten Arriens	6	6
(Australia) Ashley Naumann	4	2
(Australia) James Sekulov	6	6
(Czech Republic) Jiri Vanek	3	2
(Sweden) Ola Kristiansson	1	6	6
(Federal Republic of Yugoslavia) Nebojša Đorđević	6	4	3
(Australia) Andrew Painter	2	4
22	(Germany) Nicolas Kiefer	6	6

Second round
11	(Germany) Carsten Arriens	7	1	0
(Australia) James Sekulov	5	6	6
(Sweden) Ola Kristiansson	3	6	3
22	(Germany) Nicolas Kiefer	6	1	6

Qualifying competition
(Australia) James Sekulov	4	6	3
22	(Germany) Nicolas Kiefer	6	3	6

=== Twelfth qualifier ===
First round
12	(Germany) Jörn Renzenbrink	6^{3}	6^{2}
(Israel) Noam Behr	7^{7}	7^{7}
(United States) Brett Dickinson	4	6^{4}
(France) Maxime Huard	6	7^{7}
(United States) Jim Grabb	6	4	6
(Japan) Hideki Kaneko	3	6	2
(United States) Kenny Thorne	4	1
21	(Sweden) Magnus Norman	6	6

Second round
(Israel) Noam Behr	7^{7}	6^{5}	6
(France) Maxime Huard	6^{3}	7^{7}	4
(United States) Jim Grabb	2	3
21	(Sweden) Magnus Norman	6	6

Qualifying competition
(Israel) Noam Behr	0	2
21	(Sweden) Magnus Norman	6	6

=== Thirteenth qualifier ===
First round
13	(Sweden) Nicklas Kulti	6	6
(United States) Ivan Baron	0	3
(Japan) Takao Suzuki	7^{7}	6
(United Kingdom) Nick Baglin	6^{4}	3
WC	(Australia) Jurek Stasiak	7^{7}	3	4
(United States) Francisco Montana	6^{4}	6	6
(Germany) Rainer Schüttler	6	6
20	(Netherlands) Joost Winnink	3	1

Second round
13	(Sweden) Nicklas Kulti	6	6
(Japan) Takao Suzuki	1	1
(United States) Francisco Montana	1	6	5
(Germany) Rainer Schüttler	6	3	7

Qualifying competition
13	(Sweden) Nicklas Kulti	6	6
(Germany) Rainer Schüttler	1	2

=== Fourteenth qualifier ===
First round
14	(United States) Bryan Shelton	6	5	8
(Australia) Neil Borwick	3	7	10
WC	(Australia) Wayne Arthurs	6^{10}	6	8
(Australia) Michael Hill	7^{12}	4	6
(United States) Brian MacPhie	7^{7}	6
(Australia) Joshua Eagle	6^{2}	3
(United States) Christopher Pressley	6	3	3
19	(Germany) Lars Burgsmüller	3	6	6

Second round
(Australia) Neil Borwick	4	6^{3}
WC	(Australia) Wayne Arthurs	6	7^{7}
(United States) Brian MacPhie	6	6
19	(Germany) Lars Burgsmüller	3	2

Qualifying competition
WC	(Australia) Wayne Arthurs	5	4
(United States) Brian MacPhie	7	6

=== Fifteenth qualifier ===
First round
15	(France) Thierry Guardiola	6	2	6
(Australia) Steven Randjelovic	1	6	3
(New Zealand) James Greenhalgh	6^{1}	4
(Sweden) Niclas Kroon	7^{7}	6
(France) Lionel Barthez	6	6^{7}	4
(Japan) Satoshi Iwabuchi	4	7^{9}	6
(Austria) Clemens Trimmel	2	2
17	(Israel) Eyal Ran	6	6

Second round
15	(France) Thierry Guardiola	7	6
(Sweden) Niclas Kroon	5	2
(Japan) Satoshi Iwabuchi	3	6	6
17	(Israel) Eyal Ran	6	3	8

Qualifying competition
15	(France) Thierry Guardiola	6	6^{4}	6
17	(Israel) Eyal Ran	3	7^{7}	3

=== Sixteenth qualifier ===
First round
16	(France) Jean-Philippe Fleurian	6	6
(Spain) Alberto Martín	2	1
(New Zealand) Teo Susnjak	0	4
(Japan) Gouichi Motomura	6	6
(Netherlands) Tom Kempers	6	6
(New Zealand) Scott Clark	3	1
(Australia) Vince Mellino	5	3
18	(Canada) Albert Chang	7	6

Second round
16	(France) Jean-Philippe Fleurian	5	6	6
(Japan) Gouichi Motomura	7	4	1
(Netherlands) Tom Kempers	7^{7}	6
18	(Canada) Albert Chang	6^{4}	2

Qualifying competition
16	(France) Jean-Philippe Fleurian	5	6	8
(Netherlands) Tom Kempers	7	4	6
