= 1995 Australian Open – Women's singles qualifying =

Women's singles qualifying
- 1995 Australian Open

Events
Singles	men	women		boys	girls
Doubles	men	women	mixed	boys	girls
WC Singles	men	women	quad
WC Doubles	men	women	quad
Legends	men	women	mixed

Qualification
Singles	men	women
- Australian Open

This article displays the qualifying draw for women's singles at the 1995 Australian Open.

== Seeds ==
1. (Sweden) Maria Strandlund (second round)
2. (Canada) Jana Nejedly (first round)
3. (Czech Republic) Andrea Strnadová (second round)
4. (Belgium) Dominique Monami (first round)
5. (Belgium) Nancy Feber (first round)
6. (Argentina) Mercedes Paz (qualifying competition, lucky loser)
7. (Netherlands) Yvette Basting (qualifying competition, lucky loser)
8. (South Africa) Dianne Van Rensburg (qualifying competition)
9. (Netherlands) Nicole Muns-Jagerman (second round)
10. (United Kingdom) Clare Wood (second round)
11. (United States) Katrina Adams (first round)
12. (United States) Elly Hakami (qualified)
13. (Italy) Rita Grande (second round)
14. (Japan) Naoko Kijimuta (qualified)
15. (Netherlands) Kim de Weille (second round)
16. (Netherlands) Petra Kamstra (first round)

== Qualifiers ==
1. (Madagascar) Dally Randriantefy
2. (Czech Republic) Kateřina Kroupová-Šišková
3. (Japan) Rika Hiraki
4. (Japan) Naoko Kijimuta
5. (Japan) Yuka Yoshida
6. (United States) Audra Keller
7. (Japan) Hiromi Nagano
8. (United States) Elly Hakami

== Lucky losers ==
1. (Netherlands) Yvette Basting
2. (Argentina) Mercedes Paz

== Qualifying draw ==
Key

- Q = Qualifier
- WC = Wild card
- LL = Lucky loser
- Alt = Alternate
- ITF = ITF entry
- PR = Protected ranking
- SR = Special ranking
- SE = Special exempt
- JE = Junior exempt
- JR = Junior Accelerator Programme entrant
- CO = College Accelerator Programme entrant
- NG = Next Gen Accelerator Program entrant
- w/o = Walkover
- r = Retired
- d = Defaulted

=== First qualifier ===
First round
1	(Sweden) Maria Strandlund	6	6
(Netherlands) Hanneke Ketelaars	2	4
(United States) Erika deLone	6	6
WC	(Australia) Jodi Richardson	1	4
(Madagascar) Dally Randriantefy	6	6
(Netherlands) Maaike Koutstaal	0	2
(United States) Janet Lee	7	4	9
9	(Netherlands) Nicole Muns-Jagerman	5	6	11

Second round
1	(Sweden) Maria Strandlund	5	4
(United States) Erika deLone	7	6
(Madagascar) Dally Randriantefy	6	2
9	(Netherlands) Nicole Muns-Jagerman	2	0^{r}

Qualifying competition
(United States) Erika deLone	6	5	4
(Madagascar) Dally Randriantefy	1	7	6

=== Second qualifier ===
First round
15	(Netherlands) Kim de Weille	6	4	6
(United States) Angela Lettiere	2	6	1
(Czech Republic) Kateřina Kroupová-Šišková	3	6	6
(Ukraine) Olga Lugina	6	3	2
(Venezuela) María Vento	6	6
WC	(Australia) Shannon Peters	4	3
(Canada) Sonya Jeyaseelan	1	7^{8}	2
6	(Argentina) Mercedes Paz	6	6^{6}	6

Second round
15	(Netherlands) Kim de Weille	6	2	2
(Czech Republic) Kateřina Kroupová-Šišková	3	6	6
(Venezuela) María Vento	4	1
6	(Argentina) Mercedes Paz	6	6

Qualifying competition
(Czech Republic) Kateřina Kroupová-Šišková	7^{7}	1	6
6	(Argentina) Mercedes Paz	6^{2}	6	4

=== Third qualifier ===
First round
3	(Czech Republic) Andrea Strnadová	7	6
WC	(Australia) Tracey Morton-Rodgers	5	2
(United States) Laxmi Poruri	7	4	5
(Japan) Rika Hiraki	5	6	7
(Netherlands) Carin Bakkum	0	4
(United States) Julie Steven	6	6
(Japan) Misumi Miyauchi	6	6
11	(United States) Katrina Adams	4	3

Second round
3	(Czech Republic) Andrea Strnadová	1	1
(Japan) Rika Hiraki	6	6
(United States) Julie Steven	2	6	2
(Japan) Misumi Miyauchi	6	3	6

Qualifying competition
(Japan) Rika Hiraki	4	6	6
(Japan) Misumi Miyauchi	6	2	4

=== Fourth qualifier ===
First round
14	(Japan) Naoko Kijimuta	7^{7}	1	7
(United States) Kristina Brandi	6^{0}	6	5
(Hong Kong) Tang Min	1	6	6
WC	(Australia) Danielle Jones	6	3	4
(Germany) Angela Kerek	5	7	6
(Czech Republic) Ludmila Varmužová	7	5	4
(Croatia) Maja Murić	6	6^{4}	5
8	(South Africa) Dianne Van Rensburg	4	7^{7}	7

Second round
14	(Japan) Naoko Kijimuta	6	6
(Hong Kong) Tang Min	3	4
(Germany) Angela Kerek	1	7^{7}	1
8	(South Africa) Dianne Van Rensburg	6	6^{4}	6

Qualifying competition
14	(Japan) Naoko Kijimuta	6	6
8	(South Africa) Dianne Van Rensburg	2	2

=== Fifth qualifier ===
First round
5	(Belgium) Nancy Feber	2	5
(Romania) Cătălina Cristea	6	7
(France) Karine Quentrec	7	6
(United States) Stephanie Reece	5	3
(Italy) Marzia Grossi	6	4	3
(Japan) Yuka Yoshida	4	6	6
(United States) Alix Creek	6^{3}	4
13	(Italy) Rita Grande	7^{7}	6

Second round
(Romania) Cătălina Cristea	6	7^{7}
(France) Karine Quentrec	2	6^{2}
(Japan) Yuka Yoshida	4	6	6
13	(Italy) Rita Grande	6	1	4

Qualifying competition
(Romania) Cătălina Cristea	6	3	1
(Japan) Yuka Yoshida	0	6	6

=== Sixth qualifier ===
First round
10	(United Kingdom) Clare Wood	6	6
(Australia) Louise Field	2	3
(Australia) Kirrily Sharpe	1	0
(United States) Audra Keller	6	6
(Ukraine) Elena Tatarkova	1	6	8
(United States) Danielle Scott	6	2	6
(Thailand) Tamarine Tanasugarn	1	6	6
4	(Belgium) Dominique Monami	6	4	4

Second round
10	(United Kingdom) Clare Wood	1	3
(United States) Audra Keller	6	6
(Ukraine) Elena Tatarkova	6	6
(Thailand) Tamarine Tanasugarn	4	1

Qualifying competition
(United States) Audra Keller	7^{7}	7^{7}
(Ukraine) Elena Tatarkova	6^{5}	6^{1}

=== Seventh qualifier ===
First round
7	(Netherlands) Yvette Basting	4	6	6
WC	(Australia) Trudi Musgrave	6	2	0
(Germany) Anca Barna	3	0
(Germany) Adriana Barna	6	6
WC	(Australia) Angie Woolcock	6^{4}	5
(Australia) Jo-Anne Faull	7^{7}	7
(Japan) Hiromi Nagano	3	6	6
16	(Netherlands) Petra Kamstra	6	2	3

Second round
7	(Netherlands) Yvette Basting	6^{4}	6	6
(Germany) Adriana Barna	7^{7}	1	2
(Australia) Jo-Anne Faull	2	2
(Japan) Hiromi Nagano	6	6

Qualifying competition
7	(Netherlands) Yvette Basting	6^{2}	2
(Japan) Hiromi Nagano	7^{7}	6

=== Eighth qualifier ===
First round
12	(United States) Elly Hakami	6	2	9
WC	(Australia) Joanne Limmer	4	6	7
(Austria) Katharina Büche	3	1
WC	(Australia) Gail Biggs	6	6
(Japan) Ayako Hirose	3	6	4
(Canada) Rene Simpson	6	0	6
(Australia) Rennae Stubbs	6	6
2	(Canada) Jana Nejedly	3	2

Second round
12	(United States) Elly Hakami	6	4	6
WC	(Australia) Gail Biggs	2	6	1
(Canada) Rene Simpson	2	6	6
(Australia) Rennae Stubbs	6	2	2

Qualifying competition
12	(United States) Elly Hakami	6	7
(Canada) Rene Simpson	4	5
