= 1997 Australian Open – Men's singles qualifying =

Men's singles qualifying
- 1997 Australian Open

Events
Singles	men	women		boys	girls
Doubles	men	women	mixed	boys	girls
WC Singles	men	women	quad
WC Doubles	men	women	quad
Legends	men	women	mixed

Qualification
Singles	men	women
- Australian Open

This article displays the qualifying draw for men's singles at the 1997 Australian Open.

== Seeds ==
1. -
2. (The Bahamas) Mark Knowles (qualifying competition, lucky loser)
3. (Russia) Andrey Cherkasov (qualified)
4. (Italy) Omar Camporese (second round)
5. (United States) Steve Bryan (second round)
6. (Belgium) Kris Goossens (qualifying competition, lucky loser)
7. (Egypt) Tamer El-Sawy (first round)
8. (Romania) Andrei Pavel (qualifying competition, lucky loser)
9. (Germany) Jens Knippschild (qualified)
10. (Germany) Oliver Gross (second round)
11. (Uzbekistan) Oleg Ogorodov (second round)
12. (Chile) Gabriel Silberstein (first round)
13. (Sweden) Lars Jonsson (qualified)
14. (France) Jérôme Golmard (first round)
15. (Germany) Martin Sinner (qualifying competition)
16. (United States) Doug Flach (first round)
17. (Japan) Shuzo Matsuoka (qualifying competition)
18. (United States) Justin Gimelstob (qualified)
19. (Israel) Eyal Ran (qualified)
20. (Italy) Cristiano Caratti (second round)
21. (Mexico) Alejandro Hernandez (second round)
22. (Italy) Filippo Messori (first round)
23. (France) Gérard Solvès (qualifying competition)
24. (Brazil) Roberto Jabali (first round)
25. (Romania) Dinu Pescariu (qualified)
26. (South Africa) Kevin Ullyett (second round)
27. (Romania) Răzvan Sabău (second round)
28. (South Africa) David Nainkin (qualifying competition)
29. (Romania) Ionuț Moldovan (second round)
30. (Japan) Gouichi Motomura (qualifying competition)
31. (United Kingdom) Mark Petchey (qualifying competition)
32. (United States) Geoff Grant (qualified)

== Qualifiers ==
1. (Australia) Lleyton Hewitt
2. (United States) Geoff Grant
3. (Russia) Andrey Cherkasov
4. (Germany) Karsten Braasch
5. (United States) Bryan Shelton
6. (Australia) Toby Mitchell
7. (United States) Alex Reichel
8. (Romania) Dinu Pescariu
9. (Germany) Jens Knippschild
10. (Netherlands) Jacco Eltingh
11. (Netherlands) Fernon Wibier
12. (Spain) Óscar Burrieza
13. (Sweden) Lars Jonsson
14. (Israel) Eyal Ran
15. (United States) Justin Gimelstob
16. (United States) David Caldwell

== Lucky losers ==
1. (The Bahamas) Mark Knowles
2. (Romania) Andrei Pavel
3. (Belgium) Kris Goossens

== Qualifying draw ==
Key

- Q = Qualifier
- WC = Wild card
- LL = Lucky loser
- Alt = Alternate
- ITF = ITF entry
- PR = Protected ranking
- SR = Special ranking
- SE = Special exempt
- JE = Junior exempt
- JR = Junior Accelerator Programme entrant
- CO = College Accelerator Programme entrant
- NG = Next Gen Accelerator Program entrant
- w/o = Walkover
- r = Retired
- d = Defaulted

=== First qualifier ===
First round
Alt	(Switzerland) Michel Kratochvil	7^{7}	6
(Australia) Ashley Naumann	6^{2}	1
WC	(Australia) Lleyton Hewitt	6	6
(United States) Andy Stewart	3	1
(Australia) Des Tyson	6	7
WC	(Australia) Steven Bourke	1	5
(Greece) Konstantinos Economidis	4	6	4
31	(United Kingdom) Mark Petchey	6	4	6

Second round
Alt	(Switzerland) Michel Kratochvil	1	3^{r}
WC	(Australia) Lleyton Hewitt	6	4
(Australia) Des Tyson	2	3
31	(United Kingdom) Mark Petchey	6	6

Qualifying competition
WC	(Australia) Lleyton Hewitt	6	6
31	(United Kingdom) Mark Petchey	1	4

=== Second qualifier ===
First round
2	(The Bahamas) Mark Knowles	6	6
(Australia) Steven Randjelovic	4	2
(United States) Jeff Salzenstein	6^{4}	6	3
(Belarus) Max Mirnyi	7^{7}	1	6
(Sweden) Tobias Hildebrand	2	2
(United States) Cecil Mamiit	6	6
(Australia) Mark Draper	4	3
32	(United States) Geoff Grant	6	6

Second round
2	(The Bahamas) Mark Knowles	6^{4}	6	6
(Belarus) Max Mirnyi	7^{7}	4	2
(United States) Cecil Mamiit	6	2	1
32	(United States) Geoff Grant	3	6	6

Qualifying competition
2	(The Bahamas) Mark Knowles	1	6^{5}
32	(United States) Geoff Grant	6	7^{7}

=== Third qualifier ===
First round
3	(Russia) Andrey Cherkasov	6	6
(Australia) Dejan Petrović	1	1
(Australia) Grant Silcock	0	5
(Zimbabwe) Wayne Black	6	7
(United States) Brett Hansen-Dent	1	1
(Netherlands) Martijn Bok	6	6
(Italy) Claudio Pistolesi	4	4
29	(Romania) Ionuț Moldovan	6	6

Second round
3	(Russia) Andrey Cherkasov	4	7^{9}	6
(Zimbabwe) Wayne Black	6	6^{7}	4
(Netherlands) Martijn Bok	4	6	6
29	(Romania) Ionuț Moldovan	6	4	4

Qualifying competition
3	(Russia) Andrey Cherkasov	6	6
(Netherlands) Martijn Bok	0	1

=== Fourth qualifier ===
First round
4	(Italy) Omar Camporese	5
WC	(Australia) Sergio Gaoni	2^{r}
(Germany) Karsten Braasch	6	6
(Japan) Tetsuya Chaen	2	2
(New Zealand) Mark Nielsen	6^{8}	6	6
(United States) Kent Kinnear	7^{10}	2	4
(United States) Bill Behrens	7	5^{r}
30	(Japan) Gouichi Motomura	5	7

Second round
4	(Italy) Omar Camporese	4	4
(Germany) Karsten Braasch	6	6
(New Zealand) Mark Nielsen	3	6	4
30	(Japan) Gouichi Motomura	6	4	6

Qualifying competition
(Germany) Karsten Braasch	3	6	7
30	(Japan) Gouichi Motomura	6	4	5

=== Fifth qualifier ===
First round
5	(United States) Steve Bryan	6	6
(New Zealand) Glenn Wilson	3	1
(United States) Bryan Shelton	4	6	6
(United States) Rob Chess	6	4	4
WC	(Australia) Luke Ronald O'Donnell	0	3
(Australia) James Holmes	6	6
(The Bahamas) Roger Smith	4	3
28	(South Africa) David Nainkin	6	6

Second round
5	(United States) Steve Bryan	1	3
(United States) Bryan Shelton	6	6
(Australia) James Holmes	6	3	4
28	(South Africa) David Nainkin	4	6	6

Qualifying competition
(United States) Bryan Shelton	6	6
28	(South Africa) David Nainkin	3	0

=== Sixth qualifier ===
First round
6	(Belgium) Kris Goossens	5	6	6
(Hungary) Tamás György	7	3	2
(Australia) Jed-Denum Gould	6	2	1
(Germany) Marcus Hilpert	4	6	6
(Greece) Pantelis Moschoutis	6	4	3
(Australia) Toby Mitchell	4	6	6
(Israel) Kobi Ziv	4	6^{4}
27	(Romania) Răzvan Sabău	6	7^{7}

Second round
6	(Belgium) Kris Goossens	6	5	9
(Germany) Marcus Hilpert	2	7	7
(Australia) Toby Mitchell	7	6
27	(Romania) Răzvan Sabău	5	3

Qualifying competition
6	(Belgium) Kris Goossens	3	5
(Australia) Toby Mitchell	6	7

=== Seventh qualifier ===
First round
7	(Egypt) Tamer El-Sawy	6^{6}	2
(Mexico) Marco Osorio	7^{8}	6
(United States) Alex Reichel	6	6
(Australia) Jurek Stasiak	3	1
(Netherlands) Tom Kempers	2	4
(Israel) Eyal Erlich	6	6
(United States) Luke Jensen	4	2
26	(South Africa) Kevin Ullyett	6	6

Second round
(Mexico) Marco Osorio	3	5
(United States) Alex Reichel	6	7
(Israel) Eyal Erlich	6	1	7
26	(South Africa) Kevin Ullyett	3	6	5

Qualifying competition
(United States) Alex Reichel	6	6
(Israel) Eyal Erlich	3	2

=== Eighth qualifier ===
First round
8	(Romania) Andrei Pavel	7^{7}	6
(Sweden) Lars-Anders Wahlgren	6^{4}	4
(Australia) Michael Hill	6	3	6
(Australia) Heath Denman	4	6	3
(North Macedonia) Aleksandar Kitinov	4	6^{3}
(United States) Mashiska Washington	6	7^{7}
(Japan) Kentaro Masuda	2	5
25	(Romania) Dinu Pescariu	6	7

Second round
8	(Romania) Andrei Pavel	7^{10}	6
(Australia) Michael Hill	6^{8}	0
(United States) Mashiska Washington	6^{2}	3
25	(Romania) Dinu Pescariu	7^{7}	6

Qualifying competition
8	(Romania) Andrei Pavel	6	2	4
25	(Romania) Dinu Pescariu	3	6	6

=== Ninth qualifier ===
First round
9	(Germany) Jens Knippschild	6	6
(Argentina) Francisco Yunis	3	2
(Italy) Diego Nargiso	5	3
(United States) Brian MacPhie	7	6
(Canada) Sébastien Leblanc	2	7	5
(Croatia) Ivan Ljubičić	6	5	7
WC	(Australia) Jordan Kerr	3	3
23	(France) Gérard Solvès	6	6

Second round
9	(Germany) Jens Knippschild	4	6	6
(United States) Brian MacPhie	6	2	3
(Croatia) Ivan Ljubičić	5	7^{8}	1
23	(France) Gérard Solvès	7	6^{6}	6

Qualifying competition
9	(Germany) Jens Knippschild	6	6
23	(France) Gérard Solvès	2	4

=== Tenth qualifier ===
First round
10	(Germany) Oliver Gross	6	6
(Australia) Mahyar Goodarz	2	3
(United States) Kenny Thorne	3	3
(Netherlands) Jacco Eltingh	6	6
(United States) Steve Campbell	4	6^{5}
(Australia) Allen Belobrajdic	6	7^{7}
(Germany) Christian Vinck	7^{10}	6
24	(Brazil) Roberto Jabali	6^{8}	2

Second round
10	(Germany) Oliver Gross	5	6	5
(Netherlands) Jacco Eltingh	7	0	7
(Australia) Allen Belobrajdic	6	6
(Germany) Christian Vinck	0	2

Qualifying competition
(Netherlands) Jacco Eltingh	7^{7}	6
(Australia) Allen Belobrajdic	6^{4}	2

=== Eleventh qualifier ===
First round
11	(Uzbekistan) Oleg Ogorodov	6	6
(Japan) Satoshi Iwabuchi	3	2
(South Korea) Yoon Yong-il	4	6	6
(Australia) Andrew Ilie	6	2	3
WC	(Australia) Michael Logarzo	2	4
(United States) Jim Grabb	6	6
(Germany) Mark Joachim	6	6^{5}	6
(Netherlands) Fernon Wibier	4	7^{7}	8

Second round
11	(Uzbekistan) Oleg Ogorodov	4	3
(South Korea) Yoon Yong-il	6	6
(United States) Jim Grabb	5	2
(Netherlands) Fernon Wibier	7	6

Qualifying competition
(South Korea) Yoon Yong-il	7	4	4
(Netherlands) Fernon Wibier	5	6	6

=== Twelfth qualifier ===
First round
21	(Mexico) Alejandro Hernandez	6	6
12	(Chile) Gabriel Silberstein	4	4
(United Kingdom) Andrew Richardson	6	6
(Australia) Novak Nash	3	2
(Japan) Ryuso Tsujino	7^{7}	6^{8}	5
(Netherlands) Hendrik Jan Davids	6^{3}	7^{10}	7
(Spain) Óscar Burrieza	6	6
22	(Italy) Filippo Messori	2	0

Second round
21	(Mexico) Alejandro Hernandez	3	4
(United Kingdom) Andrew Richardson	6	6
(Netherlands) Hendrik Jan Davids	1	1
(Spain) Óscar Burrieza	6	6

Qualifying competition
(United Kingdom) Andrew Richardson	2	4
(Spain) Óscar Burrieza	6	6

=== Thirteenth qualifier ===
First round
13	(Sweden) Lars Jonsson	7^{7}	6
(Israel) Nir Welgreen	6^{5}	3
(New Zealand) Steven Downs	4	6	6
(Germany) Rainer Schüttler	6	3	3
(Australia) Joseph Sirianni	2	6	3
(South Africa) Vaughan Snyman	6	3	6
(Australia) James Sekulov	6^{5}	6	2
20	(Italy) Cristiano Caratti	7^{7}	4	6

Second round
13	(Sweden) Lars Jonsson	7^{7}	6
(New Zealand) Steven Downs	6^{4}	2
(South Africa) Vaughan Snyman	6	6
20	(Italy) Cristiano Caratti	1	3

Qualifying competition
13	(Sweden) Lars Jonsson	6	6
(South Africa) Vaughan Snyman	4	2

=== Fourteenth qualifier ===
First round
14	(France) Jérôme Golmard	6	2	3
(United States) Wade McGuire	4	6	6
(United States) Jack Waite	6	6
(Australia) Vince Mellino	2	1
(United States) Francisco Montana	6	6
(Ukraine) Andrei Rybalko	2	2
(South Africa) Chris Haggard	3	3
19	(Israel) Eyal Ran	6	6

Second round
(United States) Wade McGuire	6	6
(United States) Jack Waite	1	3
(United States) Francisco Montana	6^{2}	6	2
19	(Israel) Eyal Ran	7^{7}	3	6

Qualifying competition
(United States) Wade McGuire	3	5
19	(Israel) Eyal Ran	6	7

=== Fifteenth qualifier ===
First round
15	(Germany) Martin Sinner	6	7
(Australia) Clinton Snell	3	5
(New Zealand) James Greenhalgh	4	7	8
WC	(Australia) Klaudiusz Gursztyn	6	5	10
(United Kingdom) Jamie Delgado	6	6
(Italy) Mosé Navarra	3	0
WC	(Australia) Nathan Healey	2	2
18	(United States) Justin Gimelstob	6	6

Second round
15	(Germany) Martin Sinner	6	6
WC	(Australia) Klaudiusz Gursztyn	3	1
(United Kingdom) Jamie Delgado	3	2
18	(United States) Justin Gimelstob	6	6

Qualifying competition
15	(Germany) Martin Sinner	6	5	1
18	(United States) Justin Gimelstob	3	7	6

=== Sixteenth qualifier ===
First round
16	(United States) Doug Flach	6	0	8
(Germany) Carsten Arriens	3	6	10
(United States) David Caldwell	7^{7}	6
WC	(Australia) Andrew Painter	6^{5}	3
(Australia) Leigh Holland	6^{3}	6	2
(New Zealand) Teo Susnjak	7^{7}	2	6
(Japan) Kotaro Miyachi	1	2
17	(Japan) Shuzo Matsuoka	6	6

Second round
(Germany) Carsten Arriens	3	4
(United States) David Caldwell	6	6
(New Zealand) Teo Susnjak	3	2
17	(Japan) Shuzo Matsuoka	6	6

Qualifying competition
(United States) David Caldwell	6	6
17	(Japan) Shuzo Matsuoka	4	4
