= 1996 French Open – Men's singles qualifying =

Men's singles qualifying
- 1996 French Open

Events
Singles	men	women		boys	girls
Doubles	men	women	mixed	boys	girls
WC Singles	men	women	quad
WC Doubles	men	women	quad
Legends	−45	45+	women

Qualification
Singles	men	women
- French Open

Players who neither had high enough rankings nor received wild cards to enter the main draw of the annual French Open Tennis Championships participated in a qualifying tournament held in the week before the event.

== Seeds ==
1. (Sweden) Nicklas Kulti (qualifying competition, lucky loser)
2. (Slovakia) Ján Krošlák (qualified)
3. (Morocco) Hicham Arazi (second round)
4. (Russia) Andrei Olhovskiy (qualified)
5. (Spain) Galo Blanco (qualified)
6. (Sweden) Magnus Norman (qualifying competition, lucky loser)
7. (Italy) Cristiano Caratti (first round)
8. (Germany) Alex Rădulescu (first round)
9. (Germany) Dirk Dier (qualified)
10. (Ecuador) Luis Morejón (second round)
11. (Germany) Lars Burgsmüller (first round)
12. (Belgium) Dick Norman (qualified)
13. (Brazil) Gustavo Kuerten (qualified)
14. (United Kingdom) Chris Wilkinson (first round)
15. (Argentina) Gastón Etlis (qualified)
16. (Sweden) Patrik Fredriksson (qualified)
17. (Senegal) Yahiya Doumbia (second round)
18. (Australia) Andrew Ilie (qualifying competition)
19. (Russia) Andrey Cherkasov (second round)
20. (Canada) Daniel Nestor (qualifying competition)
21. (Spain) Tati Rascón (first round)
22. (Mexico) Alejandro Hernandez (first round)
23. (Sweden) Tomas Nydahl (first round)
24. (Germany) Patrick Baur (first round)
25. (Spain) Emilio Benfele Álvarez (second round)
26. (Argentina) Mariano Zabaleta (second round)
27. (United States) Jared Palmer (qualified)
28. (Italy) Diego Nargiso (first round)
29. (Spain) Óscar Martínez (qualifying competition)
30. (France) Frédéric Vitoux (second round)
31. (Spain) Albert Portas (first round)
32. (Spain) Ignacio Truyol-Turrion (second round)

== Qualifiers ==
1. (Argentina) Franco Squillari
2. (Slovakia) Ján Krošlák
3. (France) Frédéric Fontang
4. (Russia) Andrei Olhovskiy
5. (Spain) Galo Blanco
6. (United States) Jared Palmer
7. (Finland) Kim Tiilikainen
8. (Australia) Grant Doyle
9. (Germany) Dirk Dier
10. (United States) Francisco Montana
11. (Spain) Jacobo Diaz-Ruiz
12. (Belgium) Dick Norman
13. (Brazil) Gustavo Kuerten
14. (Egypt) Tamer El-Sawy
15. (Argentina) Gastón Etlis
16. (Sweden) Patrik Fredriksson

== Lucky losers ==
1. (Sweden) Magnus Norman
2. (Sweden) Nicklas Kulti

== Qualifying draw ==
Key

- Q = Qualifier
- WC = Wild card
- LL = Lucky loser
- Alt = Alternate
- ITF = ITF entry
- PR = Protected ranking
- SR = Special ranking
- SE = Special exempt
- JE = Junior exempt
- JR = Junior Accelerator Programme entrant
- CO = College Accelerator Programme entrant
- NG = Next Gen Accelerator Program entrant
- w/o = Walkover
- r = Retired
- d = Defaulted

=== First qualifier ===
First round
1	(Sweden) Nicklas Kulti	7^{7}	7
(Sweden) Lars Jonsson	6^{5}	5
WC	(France) Julien Cuaz	6	6^{6}	2
(Austria) Herbert Wiltschnig	2	7^{8}	6
(United States) Alex O'Brien	7^{7}	4	6
WC	(France) Olivier Malcor	6^{2}	6	3
(Argentina) Franco Squillari	3	6	6
31	(Spain) Albert Portas	6	1	1

Second round
1	(Sweden) Nicklas Kulti	6	6
(Austria) Herbert Wiltschnig	2	2
(United States) Alex O'Brien	6	6^{1}	4
(Argentina) Franco Squillari	2	7^{7}	6

Qualifying competition
1	(Sweden) Nicklas Kulti	7^{7}	5	1
(Argentina) Franco Squillari	6^{4}	7	6

=== Second qualifier ===
First round
2	(Slovakia) Ján Krošlák	6	6
(Argentina) Martin Rodriguez	3	3
(Spain) Pepe Imaz	1	2
(Italy) Corrado Borroni	6	6
(France) Maxime Huard	6^{3}	1
(Germany) Oliver Gross	7^{7}	6
(Switzerland) Alexandre Strambini	0	2
32	(Spain) Ignacio Truyol-Turrion	6	6

Second round
2	(Slovakia) Ján Krošlák	4	7^{7}	6
(Italy) Corrado Borroni	6	6^{3}	3
(Germany) Oliver Gross	6	3	6
32	(Spain) Ignacio Truyol-Turrion	2	6	2

Qualifying competition
2	(Slovakia) Ján Krošlák	6	6
(Germany) Oliver Gross	4	2

=== Third qualifier ===
First round
3	(Morocco) Hicham Arazi	6	7^{7}
(United States) Brian MacPhie	4	6^{3}
(France) Frédéric Fontang	6	6
(Kenya) Paul Wekesa	3	2
(Germany) Lars Rehmann	6	2	1
(Germany) Michael Geserer	3	6	6
(Zimbabwe) Wayne Black	3	7^{7}	2
29	(Spain) Óscar Martínez	6	6^{5}	6

Second round
3	(Morocco) Hicham Arazi	6	4	2
(France) Frédéric Fontang	3	6	6
(Germany) Michael Geserer	4	6	7
29	(Spain) Óscar Martínez	6	1	9

Qualifying competition
(France) Frédéric Fontang	6	3	6
29	(Spain) Óscar Martínez	4	6	3

=== Fourth qualifier ===
First round
4	(Russia) Andrei Olhovskiy	7	6
(South Africa) Robbie Koenig	5	4
(Brazil) Francisco Costa	5	5
(Argentina) Miguel Pastura	7	7
WC	(France) Arnaud Clément	7	6^{4}	2
(Argentina) Franco Davín	5	7^{7}	6
(Czech Republic) Radomír Vašek	4	2
30	(France) Frederic Vitoux	6	6

Second round
4	(Russia) Andrei Olhovskiy	6	4	6
(Argentina) Miguel Pastura	2	6	4
(Argentina) Franco Davín	6	4	6
30	(France) Frederic Vitoux	2	6	2

Qualifying competition
4	(Russia) Andrei Olhovskiy	6	7^{7}
(Argentina) Franco Davín	4	6^{5}

=== Fifth qualifier ===
First round
5	(Spain) Galo Blanco	6	6
WC	(France) Gilles Bastié	4	4
(Austria) Rainer Falenti	6	6
(South Africa) David Nainkin	1	0
(Germany) Jörn Renzenbrink	1	6	2
(Argentina) Andrés Zingman	6	4	6
(Romania) Dinu Pescariu	6	6
28	(Italy) Diego Nargiso	3	0

Second round
5	(Spain) Galo Blanco	6	6
(Austria) Rainer Falenti	3	3
(Argentina) Andrés Zingman	3	2
(Romania) Dinu Pescariu	6	6

Qualifying competition
5	(Spain) Galo Blanco	6	4	8
(Romania) Dinu Pescariu	4	6	6

=== Sixth qualifier ===
First round
6	(Sweden) Magnus Norman	6	6
(United Kingdom) Danny Sapsford	3	3
(Netherlands) Joost Winnink	2^{r}
(Brazil) Jaime Oncins	5
(Germany) Alexander Mronz	2	4
(United Kingdom) Mark Petchey	6	6
(France) Daniel Courcol	3	1
27	(United States) Jared Palmer	6	6

Second round
6	(Sweden) Magnus Norman	6	6
(Brazil) Jaime Oncins	4	2
(United Kingdom) Mark Petchey	3	6^{3}
27	(United States) Jared Palmer	6	7^{7}

Qualifying competition
6	(Sweden) Magnus Norman	3	3
27	(United States) Jared Palmer	6	6

=== Seventh qualifier ===
First round
7	(Italy) Cristiano Caratti	5	6	3
(Germany) Carsten Arriens	7	2	6
(Argentina) Carlos Gómez-Díaz	6	7^{7}
WC	(France) Jean-Baptiste Perlant	2	6^{2}
WC	(France) Jean-François Bachelot	4	2
(Finland) Kim Tiilikainen	6	6
(Argentina) Agustín Garizzio	6	2	4
25	(Spain) Emilio Benfele Álvarez	3	6	6

Second round
(Germany) Carsten Arriens	7^{7}	6
(Argentina) Carlos Gómez-Díaz	6^{5}	4
(Finland) Kim Tiilikainen	6	6
25	(Spain) Emilio Benfele Álvarez	4	1

Qualifying competition
(Germany) Carsten Arriens	6	3	1
(Finland) Kim Tiilikainen	1	6	6

=== Eighth qualifier ===
First round
8	(Germany) Alex Rădulescu	6^{8}	6	0
(Australia) Grant Doyle	7^{10}	2	6
(Netherlands) Martijn Belgraver	6^{3}	6	6
(Germany) Nicolas Kiefer	7^{7}	2	3
(North Macedonia) Aleksandar Kitinov	4	7^{7}	5
(India) Mahesh Bhupathi	6	6^{3}	7
(France) Stéphane Huet	1	4
26	(Argentina) Mariano Zabaleta	6	6

Second round
(Australia) Grant Doyle	4	7	6
(Netherlands) Martijn Belgraver	6	5	4
(India) Mahesh Bhupathi	6	6
26	(Argentina) Mariano Zabaleta	4	4

Qualifying competition
(Australia) Grant Doyle	6	3	6
(India) Mahesh Bhupathi	3	6	2

=== Ninth qualifier ===
First round
9	(Germany) Dirk Dier	6	6
(United Kingdom) Nick Gould	4	0
(Spain) Victor Sendin	4	6	3
(Germany) Arne Thoms	6	1	6
(France) Pier Gauthier	3	6	6
(Sweden) Federico Rovai	6	1	2
(Czech Republic) Radovan Světlík	2	6	6
24	(Germany) Patrick Baur	6	0	4

Second round
9	(Germany) Dirk Dier	6	6
(Germany) Arne Thoms	3	2
(France) Pier Gauthier	7^{7}	6
(Czech Republic) Radovan Světlík	6^{5}	1

Qualifying competition
9	(Germany) Dirk Dier	6	6
(France) Pier Gauthier	4	3

=== Tenth qualifier ===
First round
10	(Ecuador) Luis Morejón	7	6
(Australia) Peter Tramacchi	5	1
(United States) Francisco Montana	6	6
Alt	(Sweden) Lars-Anders Wahlgren	3	3
(Czech Republic) Václav Roubíček	1	5
(Costa Rica) Juan-Antonio Marin	6	7
(Hungary) József Krocskó	2	6	6
23	(Sweden) Tomas Nydahl	6	0	2

Second round
10	(Ecuador) Luis Morejón	3	6	6
(United States) Francisco Montana	6	4	8
(Costa Rica) Juan-Antonio Marin	2	6	3
(Hungary) József Krocskó	6	4	6

Qualifying competition
(United States) Francisco Montana	6	6
(Hungary) József Krocskó	3	1

=== Eleventh qualifier ===
First round
11	(Germany) Lars Burgsmüller	6^{0}	3
(United States) Donald Johnson	7^{7}	6
(Spain) Jacobo Diaz-Ruiz	2	6	6
(France) Jérôme Loustalot	6	4	4
(Haiti) Ronald Agénor	7^{7}	7^{7}
(United States) Kenny Thorne	6^{2}	6^{4}
(Germany) Karsten Braasch	6	6
21	(Spain) Tati Rascón	2	3

Second round
(United States) Donald Johnson	2	6^{0}
(Spain) Jacobo Diaz-Ruiz	6	7^{7}
(Haiti) Ronald Agénor	7^{7}	3	12
(Germany) Karsten Braasch	6^{4}	6	10

Qualifying competition
(Spain) Jacobo Diaz-Ruiz	6	6
(Haiti) Ronald Agénor	1	4

=== Twelfth qualifier ===
First round
12	(Belgium) Dick Norman	6	6
(Brazil) Nelson Aerts	3	4
(Spain) Álex Calatrava	6	5	6
(Hungary) Attila Sávolt	2	7	3
(Sweden) Nicklas Utgren	7^{7}	6
(Brazil) Roberto Jabali	6^{0}	1
(United States) Ivan Baron	6^{5}	6	6
22	(Mexico) Alejandro Hernandez	7^{7}	3	2

Second round
12	(Belgium) Dick Norman	5	7	6
(Spain) Álex Calatrava	7	5	3
(Sweden) Nicklas Utgren	6	4	6
(United States) Ivan Baron	4	6	3

Qualifying competition
12	(Belgium) Dick Norman	6	7^{7}
(Sweden) Nicklas Utgren	4	6^{2}

=== Thirteenth qualifier ===
First round
13	(Brazil) Gustavo Kuerten	4	6	7
(United States) Jim Grabb	6	2	5
(Ecuador) Pablo Campana	2	6^{0}
(Bulgaria) Milen Velev	6	7^{7}
(France) Thierry Guardiola	6	6
(South Africa) Chris Haggard	3	1
(Ivory Coast) Claude N'Goran	6^{6}	2
20	(Canada) Daniel Nestor	7^{8}	6

Second round
13	(Brazil) Gustavo Kuerten	6	6
(Bulgaria) Milen Velev	0	2
(France) Thierry Guardiola	6	3	20
20	(Canada) Daniel Nestor	4	6	22

Qualifying competition
13	(Brazil) Gustavo Kuerten	6	6
20	(Canada) Daniel Nestor	4	2

=== Fourteenth qualifier ===
First round
14	(United Kingdom) Chris Wilkinson	1	4
(Australia) Todd Larkham	6	6
(Belarus) Max Mirnyi	4	2
(France) Lionel Barthez	6	6
WC	(France) Antony Dupuis	2	1
(Egypt) Tamer El-Sawy	6	6
(Republic of Ireland) Owen Casey	0	0
19	(Russia) Andrey Cherkasov	6	6

Second round
(Australia) Todd Larkham	5	6	6
(France) Lionel Barthez	7	4	1
(Egypt) Tamer El-Sawy	6	6
19	(Russia) Andrey Cherkasov	3	2

Qualifying competition
(Australia) Todd Larkham	1	2
(Egypt) Tamer El-Sawy	6	6

=== Fifteenth qualifier ===
First round
15	(Argentina) Gastón Etlis	6	6
(Switzerland) Ivo Heuberger	2	4
(Argentina) Hector Moretti	6^{2}	1
(Netherlands) Dennis van Scheppingen	7^{7}	6
(Australia) James Sekulov	6	6
(France) Jérôme Hanquez	2	2
(Germany) Sascha Bandermann	7	0	6
18	(Australia) Andrew Ilie	5	6	8

Second round
15	(Argentina) Gastón Etlis	7^{7}	7^{10}
(Netherlands) Dennis van Scheppingen	6^{5}	6^{8}
(Australia) James Sekulov	4	6	2
18	(Australia) Andrew Ilie	6	1	6

Qualifying competition
15	(Argentina) Gastón Etlis	7^{7}	7
18	(Australia) Andrew Ilie	6^{4}	5

=== Sixteenth qualifier ===
First round
16	(Sweden) Patrik Fredriksson	6	6
(United States) Steve Bryan	3	3
(United Kingdom) Colin Beecher	3	6^{2}
(Australia) Ben Ellwood	6	7^{7}
(Netherlands) Hendrik Jan Davids	6	1	6
(France) Guillaume Marx	4	6	3
WC	(France) Nicolas Thomann	6	4	0
17	(Senegal) Yahiya Doumbia	4	6	6

Second round
16	(Sweden) Patrik Fredriksson	2	7^{7}	6
(Australia) Ben Ellwood	6	6^{3}	4
(Netherlands) Hendrik Jan Davids	7	7^{7}
17	(Senegal) Yahiya Doumbia	5	6^{2}

Qualifying competition
16	(Sweden) Patrik Fredriksson	7	7^{7}
(Netherlands) Hendrik Jan Davids	5	6^{5}
