= Jörg Schors =

German tennis player

- Country (sports): Germany
- Born: 5 November 1974 (age 50); Aachen, West Germany
- Plays: Right-handed

Singles
- Career record: 0–1
- Highest ranking: No. 437 (15 May 1995)

Grand Slam singles results
- Australian Open: Q2 (1995)

Doubles
- Highest ranking: No. 357 (19 June 1995)

Jörg Schors (born 5 November 1974) is a German former professional tennis player.

Born in Aachen, Schors was active on tour during the 1990s, featuring mostly in satellite tournament for a best singles world ranking of 437. He made an ATP Tour main draw appearance in 1992 at the Cologne Open, losing in the first round to Lars Jönsson. In 1995 he reached the second qualifying round at the Australian Open.

Schors is Managing Director of Smile Autovermietung, a car rental company which he founded in 1994.
