= Ignacio Martínez (tennis) =

Mexican tennis player

- Country (sports): Mexico
- Born: 23 May 1972 (age 52); Mexico City, Mexico
- Height: 185 cm (6 ft 1 in)
- Turned pro: 1993
- Prize money: $25,681

Singles
- Career titles: 1–3
- Highest ranking: No. 261 (10 October 1994)

Grand Slam singles results
- Australian Open: Q2 (1995)
- Wimbledon: Q1 (1994, 1995)
- US Open: Q1 (1995)

Doubles
- Highest ranking: No. 523 (28 February 1994)

Ignacio Martínez (born 23 May 1972) is a Mexican former professional tennis player.

== Biography ==
Born in Mexico City, Martínez finished his schooling in San Diego, graduating from St. Augustine High School in 1990.

From 1991 to 1993 he played college tennis at the University of San Diego, before competing briefly on the professional tour.

Martínez reached a best singles ranking of 261 in the world. His best performance in an ATP Tour tournament came on debut, at Long Island in 1994, where he defeated world number 44 Ronald Agénor, then lost in the second round to third seed Michael Chang.
