= Carsten Arriens =

German tennis player and coach

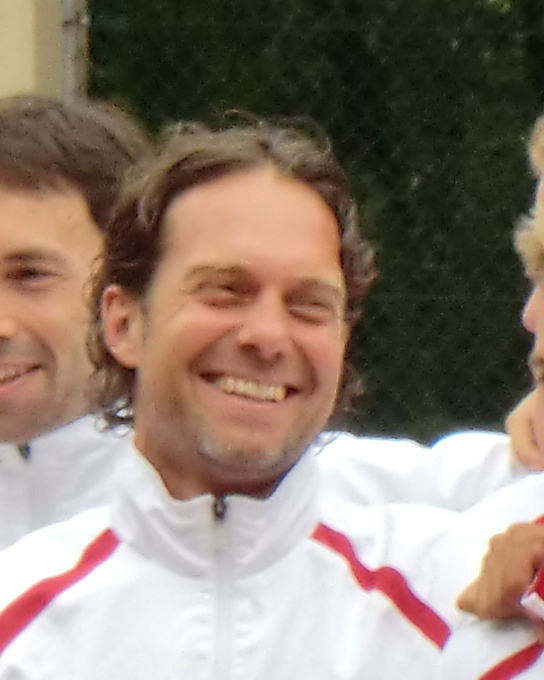
- Country (sports): (Germany)
- Residence: Munich, Germany
- Born: 11 April 1969 (age 55); Frankfurt, West Germany
- Height: 1.93 m (6 ft 4 in)
- Turned pro: 1991
- Plays: Right-handed
- Prize money: $314,588

Singles
- Career record: 28–36
- Career titles: 1
- Highest ranking: No. 109 (26 July 1993)

Grand Slam singles results
- Australian Open: Q2 (1995, 1996, 1997, 1998)
- French Open: 2R (1993)
- US Open: 2R (1995)

Doubles
- Career record: 0–0
- Career titles: 0
- Highest ranking: No. 892 (19 November 2001)
- Last updated on: 22 April 2022.

Carsten Arriens (born 11 April 1969) is a former professional tennis player from Germany.

== Career ==
Arriens played his first tournament on the ATP Tour in 1991, at the Geneva Open, where he upset world number 33 Omar Camporese.

In 1992 he won the Guarujá Open, as a qualifier. It would be his only tour title. He also reached the quarter-finals in Long Island.

At the 1993 French Open, Arriens won his first Grand Slam match, outlasting Thomas Enqvist in five sets. He was then defeated by MaliVai Washington in the second round.

He had a quiet year in 1994, with his best result being a quarter-final appearance in the Athens International.

In 1995, while playing New Zealander Brett Steven in the opening round of the French Open, Arriens became the first player in the Open era to be disqualified from the French championships. Upon losing the second set, to level the match at 1–1, the German threw his racquet into the net in frustration, from the baseline. He received a warning from Andreas Egli, the chair umpire, but after retrieving his racquet again hurled it away, this time at his chair. It however struck a linesman on his lower leg and the tournament referee was called, which culminated in Arrien's disqualification.

Also that year, Arriens made the second round of the US Open, with a win over Karol Kučera and then came up against fourth seed Boris Becker, who beat him in straight sets. He made three quarter-finals in the 1995 ATP Tour, at Dubai, Oporto and Scottsdale. In Dubai he defeated world number seven Alberto Berasategui.

He has coached several players including Andreas Beck, Louk Sorensen and Alexander Waske.

He was Team captain of the Germany Davis Cup team from 2013 to 2014.

== ATP career finals ==
=== Singles: 1 (1 title) ===
Legend Grand Slam Tournaments (0–0) ATP World Tour Finals (0–0) ATP Masters Series (0–0) ATP Championship Series (0–0) ATP World Series (1–0)	Finals by surface Hard (1–0) Clay (0–0) Grass (0–0) Carpet (0–0)	Finals by setting Outdoors (1–0) Indoors (0–0)

Result	W–L	Date	Tournament	Tier	Surface	Opponent	Score
Win	1–0	Nov 1992	Guarujá, Brazil	World Series	Hard	(Spain) Àlex Corretja	7–6^{(7–5)}, 6–3

== ATP Challenger and ITF Futures finals ==
=== Singles: 3 (1–2) ===
Legend ATP Challenger (1–1) ITF Futures (0–1)	Finals by surface Hard (0–0) Clay (0–2) Grass (0–0) Carpet (1–0)

Result	W–L	Date	Tournament	Tier	Surface	Opponent	Score
Loss	0-1	Oct 1992	Buenos Aires, Argentina	Challenger	Clay	(Spain) Juan Gisbert-Schultze	1–6, 6–7
Win	1-1	Feb 1997	Kyoto, Japan	Challenger	Carpet	(India) Mahesh Bhupathi	3–6, 6–2, 7–6
Loss	1-2	Jun 1998	Germany F10, Albstadt	Futures	Clay	(Germany) Daniel Elsner	3–6, 2–6

=== Doubles: 1 (1–0) ===
Legend ATP Challenger (0–0) ITF Futures (1–0)	Finals by surface Hard (1–0) Clay (0–0) Grass (0–0) Carpet (0–0)

Result	W–L	Date	Tournament	Tier	Surface	Partner	Opponents	Score
Win	1-0	Nov 2001	Switzerland F1, Biel	Futures	Hard	(Germany) Maximilian Abel	(Sweden) Jacob Adaktusson (Germany) Marcello Craca	6–4, 3–6, 6–0

== Performance timeline ==
Key
W	F	SF	QF	#R	RR	Q#	DNQ	A	NH

(W) winner; (F) finalist; (SF) semifinalist; (QF) quarterfinalist; (#R) rounds 4, 3, 2, 1; (RR) round-robin stage; (Q#) qualification round; (DNQ) did not qualify; (A) absent; (NH) not held; (SR) strike rate (events won / competed); (W–L) win–loss record.

=== Singles ===
Tournament	1992	1993	1994	1995	1996	1997	1998	SR	W–L	Win%
Grand Slam tournaments
Australian Open	A	A	A	Q2	Q2	Q2	Q2	0 / 0	0–0	–
French Open	A	2R	A	1R	Q3	Q3	A	0 / 2	1–2	33%
Wimbledon	A	A	A	A	A	A	A	0 / 0	0–0	–
US Open	A	1R	A	2R	A	Q2	A	0 / 2	1–2	33%
Win–loss	0–0	1–2	0–0	1–2	0–0	0–0	0–0	0 / 4	2–4	33%
ATP World Tour Masters 1000
Indian Wells	A	A	A	Q1	Q1	A	A	0 / 0	0–0	–
Miami	1R	A	A	Q1	Q1	A	A	0 / 1	0–1	0%
Hamburg	A	A	A	A	Q2	A	A	0 / 0	0–0	–
Rome	A	Q1	A	A	Q1	A	A	0 / 0	0–0	–
Canada	A	A	A	Q1	A	A	A	0 / 0	0–0	–
Stuttgart	A	A	A	A	Q1	A	A	0 / 0	0–0	–
Win–loss	0–1	0–0	0–0	0–0	0–0	0–0	0–0	0 / 1	0–1	0%
