= Dennis Schmid =

American tennis player (born 1969)

- Country (sports): United States
- Born: June 24, 1969 (age 56) Eindhoven, Netherlands
- Height: 6 ft 4 in (193 cm)

Singles
- Career record: 0–1
- Highest ranking: No. 566 (Oct 18, 1993)

Grand Slam singles results
- Australian Open: Q1 (1995)

Doubles
- Highest ranking: No. 380 (Nov 15, 1993)

Dennis Schmid (born June 24, 1969) was an American former professional tennis player.

Born in Eindhoven, Schmid grew up mostly in the Netherlands and Canada, but also spent three years of his childhood in Scottsdale, Arizona. He moved from the Netherlands back to Scottsdale in 1986 and later studied at Arizona State University, where he was a member of the varsity tennis team.

Schmid turned professional in 1992 and qualified for his first ATP Challenger tournament at Aptos in 1994, beating former top-50 player Richard Matuszewski in the first round. He made an ATP Tour main draw appearance in 1995 as a singles wildcard at the Arizona Tennis Championships.
