= Steve Herdoiza =

American tennis player

- Full name: Stephen M. Herdoiza
- Country (sports): United States
- Born: July 21, 1969 (age 55); Bloomfield Hills, Michigan
- Plays: Right-handed
- Prize money: $25,019

Singles
- Career record: 0–1
- Highest ranking: No. 281 (Aug 28, 1995)

Grand Slam singles results
- Australian Open: Q2 (1995)
- US Open: Q2 (1995)

Doubles
- Highest ranking: No. 316 (Aug 1 1994)

Stephen Herdoiza (born July 21, 1969) is an American former professional tennis player.

A native of Bloomfield Hills, Michigan, Herdoiza played collegiate tennis for Northwestern University from 1988 to 1991, earning All-Big 10 selection all four years. He won the Big 10 singles title in 1989, then in 1990 reached the quarter-finals of the NCAA championships and was named an All-American. In 1990 he was also a member of Northwestern's Big Ten championship winning team, playing beside future world number four Todd Martin.

Herdoiza, who reached a best singles world ranking of 281, made his only ATP Tour main draw appearance as a qualifier at the 1995 Canadian Open, where he was beaten in the first round by Mark Philippoussis.
