= Björn Jacob =

German tennis player

- Country (sports): Germany
- Born: 3 December 1974 (age 51)
- Plays: Right-handed
- Prize money: $27,736

Singles
- Highest ranking: No. 416 (21 Oct 1996)

Grand Slam singles results
- Australian Open: Q3 (1995)
- US Open: Q1 (1996)

Doubles
- Highest ranking: No. 248 (8 Sep 1997)

Björn Jacob (born 3 December 1974) is a German former professional tennis player.

Jacob, a French Open junior quarter-finalist, competed on the professional tour in the 1990s and had a career high singles ranking of 416 in the world. He featured in qualifying draws for the Australian Open and US Open. His only ATP Challenger title came in doubles, at Nettingsdorf in 1997. He is a former personal coach of Julia Görges.

== ATP Challenger titles ==
=== Doubles: (1) ===
No.	Date	Tournament	Surface	Partner	Opponents	Score
1.	Aug 1997	Nettingsdorf Challenger	Clay	(Germany) Michael Kohlmann	(Austria) Thomas Buchmayer (Austria) Thomas Strengberger	6–2, 3–6, 6–3
