= Thierry Guardiola =

French tennis player

- Country (sports): France
- Residence: Paris
- Born: 7 August 1971 (age 53); Toulouse, France
- Height: 1.88 m (6 ft 2 in)
- Turned pro: 1989
- Plays: Right-handed
- Prize money: $525,936

Singles
- Career record: 13–46
- Career titles: 0
- Highest ranking: No. 106 (19 June 2000)

Grand Slam singles results
- Australian Open: 2R (1995)
- French Open: 2R (1992, 1995)
- US Open: 1R (2000)

Doubles
- Career record: 0–5
- Career titles: 0
- Highest ranking: No. 375 (13 July 1992)

Grand Slam doubles results
- French Open: 1R (1993, 1995, 2000)

Thierry Guardiola (born 7 August 1971) is a former professional tennis player from France.

== Career ==
Guardiola, aged 15, broke a thigh bone playing in the juniors and was told that he would never play tennis again. He however went on to win the Under-18 French National Championships in 1989.

In 1994 he upset world number 11 Magnus Gustafsson at the Philips Open in Nice, en route to the quarterfinals, where he lost to Slava Doseděl. The biggest win however was over four-time Grand Slam champion Jim Courier in the first round of the 1995 Italian Open, one of that year's ATP Super 9 tournaments. The Frenchman was a quarterfinalist on one further occasion during his tour career, in the Marseille Open 13.

His first three Grand Slam appearances were all in his home event, the French Open, where he made the second round in 1992 and lost five set opening round matches in 1994 and 1995, to Bernd Karbacher and rising star Yevgeny Kafelnikov. Guardiola reached the second round of the 1995 Australian Open, defeating Jason Stoltenberg, the world number 20. He managed to make the second round again in the 1995 French Open but never won another Grand Slam match. In his remaining three Grand Slams he had the misfortune of having to start the tournaments against two third seeds (Thomas Muster and Magnus Norman) and at the 2000 US Open had to play eventual champion Marat Safin.

== Challenger titles ==
=== Singles: (2) ===
No.	Year	Tournament	Surface	Opponent	Score
1.	1993	Rome, Italy	Clay	(France) Jean-Philippe Fleurian	6–4, 6–2
2.	1994	Cherbourg, France	Carpet	(France) Lionel Roux	6–4, 6–4
