= Martijn Bok =

Dutch tennis player

- Country (sports): Netherlands
- Residence: Vught, Netherlands
- Born: 8 March 1973 (age 52) Best, Netherlands
- Plays: Right-handed
- Prize money: $37,127

Singles
- Career record: 0–0
- Career titles: 0
- Highest ranking: No. 212 (22 May 1995)

Doubles
- Career record: 1–1
- Career titles: 1 Challenger
- Highest ranking: No. 204 (16 October 1995)
- Last updated on: 26 August 2019.

Martijn Bok (born 8 March 1973) is a retired Dutch tennis player.

Bok has a career high ATP singles ranking of 212 achieved on 22 May 1995. He also has a career high doubles ranking of 204 achieved on 16 October 1995.

Bok has won 1 ATP Challenger doubles title at the 1995 Seville Challenger.

Bok is the current coach of Petra Martić, tennis professional from Croatia.

== Tour titles ==
Legend
Grand Slam (0)
ATP Masters Series (0)
ATP Tour (0)
Challengers (1)

=== Doubles ===
Result	Date	Category	Tournament	Surface	Partner	Opponents	Score
Winner	July 1995	Challenger	Seville, Spain	Clay	(Belgium) Tom Vanhoudt	(United States) Francisco Montana (Ivory Coast) Claude N'Goran	6–2, 6–2
