= 1995 Australian Open – Women's doubles =

Women's doubles
- 1995 Australian Open

Final
- Champion: (Czech Republic) Jana Novotná (Spain) Arantxa Sánchez Vicario
- Runner-up: (United States) Gigi Fernández (Belarus) Natasha Zvereva
- Score: 6–3, 6–7^{(3–7)}, 6–4

Details
- Draw: 64
- Seeds: 16

Events
Singles	men	women		boys	girls
Doubles	men	women	mixed	boys	girls
WC Singles	men	women	quad
WC Doubles	men	women	quad
Legends	men	women	mixed
- Australian Open

The 1995 Australian Open was a tennis tournament played on outdoor hard courts at Flinders Park in Melbourne in Victoria in Australia. It was the 83rd edition of the Australian Open and was held from 16 through 29 January 1995.

== Seeds ==
Champion seeds are indicated in bold text while text in italics indicates the round in which those seeds were eliminated.

1. (United States) Gigi Fernández / (Belarus) Natasha Zvereva (final)
2. (Czech Republic) **Jana Novotná** / (Spain) **Arantxa Sánchez Vicario (champions)**
3. (United States) Lindsay Davenport / (United States) Lisa Raymond (semifinals)
4. (Netherlands) Manon Bollegraf / (Latvia) Larisa Neiland (semifinals)
5. (United States) Meredith McGrath / (Australia) Rennae Stubbs (third round)
6. (France) Julie Halard-Decugis / (United States) Pam Shriver (second round)
7. (United States) Patty Fendick / (United States) Mary Joe Fernández (quarterfinals)
8. (United States) Lori McNeil / (Czech Republic) Helena Suková (quarterfinals)
9. (Argentina) Gabriela Sabatini / (Netherlands) Brenda Schultz (second round)
10. (Russia) Eugenia Maniokova / (Georgia (country)) Leila Meskhi (quarterfinals)
11. (United States) Katrina Adams / (United States) Zina Garrison (first round)
12. (United States) Debbie Graham / (United States) Shaun Stafford (third round)
13. (Indonesia) Yayuk Basuki / (Japan) Nana Miyagi (first round)
14. (Bulgaria) Katerina Maleeva / (Ukraine) Natalia Medvedeva (first round)
15. (United States) Ginger Helgeson-Nielsen / (Australia) Rachel McQuillan (first round)
16. (Spain) Conchita Martínez / (Argentina) Patricia Tarabini (third round)

== Draw ==
Key

- Q = Qualifier
- WC = Wild card
- LL = Lucky loser
- Alt = Alternate
- ITF = ITF entry
- PR = Protected ranking
- SR = Special ranking
- SE = Special exempt
- JE = Junior exempt
- JR = Junior Accelerator Programme entrant
- CO = College Accelerator Programme entrant
- NG = Next Gen Accelerator Program entrant
- w/o = Walkover
- r = Retired
- d = Defaulted

=== Finals ===
Quarterfinals
1	(United States) Gigi Fernández (Belarus) Natasha Zvereva	6	6
10	(Russia) Eugenia Maniokova (Georgia (country)) Leila Meskhi	1	3
3	(United States) Lindsay Davenport (United States) Lisa Raymond	3	6	6
7	(United States) Patty Fendick (United States) Mary Joe Fernández	6	3	3
(Netherlands) Kristie Boogert (Netherlands) Nicole Muns-Jagerman	6	3	3
4	(Netherlands) Manon Bollegraf (Latvia) Larisa Neiland	4	6	6
8	(United States) Lori McNeil (Czech Republic) Helena Suková	0	3
2	(Czech Republic) Jana Novotná (Spain) Arantxa Sánchez Vicario	6	6

Semifinals
1	(United States) Gigi Fernández (Belarus) Natasha Zvereva	6	6
3	(United States) Lindsay Davenport (United States) Lisa Raymond	3	4
4	(Czech Republic) Manon Bollegraf (Latvia) Larisa Neiland	5	1
2	(Netherlands) Jana Novotná (Spain) Arantxa Sánchez Vicario	7	6

Final
1	(United States) Gigi Fernández (Belarus) Natasha Zvereva	3	7	4
2	(Czech Republic) Jana Novotná (Spain) Arantxa Sánchez Vicario	6	6^{3}	6

=== Top half ===
==== Section 1 ====
First round
1	(United States) G Fernández (Belarus) N Zvereva	6	6
(Italy) L Golarsa (Argentina) M Paz	2	4
(United States) N Arendt (Germany) C Singer	6	6
(Argentina) B Fulco (Canada) R Simpson	3	3
(South Africa) E Reinach (Romania) I Spîrlea	4	6	6
(Canada) J Hetherington (Netherlands) C Vis	6	4	2
(Japan) K Nagatsuka (Japan) A Sugiyama	3	6	9
11	(United States) K Adams (United States) Z Garrison	6	4	7
10	(Russia) E Maniokova (Georgia (country)) L Meskhi	6	7
(Germany) K Kschwendt (Bulgaria) M Maleeva	1	5
(Italy) R Grande (South Africa) J Kruger	6	6
(Romania) C Cristea (Netherlands) M Koutstaal	4	2
(Germany) W Probst (United States) D Scott	4	7	6
(Belgium) S Appelmans (Netherlands) M Oremans	6	5	2
6	(France) J Halard-Decugis (United States) P Shriver	6	6
(United States) S Reece (United States) M Werdel-Witmeyer	2	3

Second round
1	(United States) G Fernández (Belarus) N Zvereva	6	5	6
(United States) N Arendt (Germany) C Singer	4	7	3
(South Africa) E Reinach (Romania) I Spîrlea	6	6
(Japan) K Nagatsuka (Japan) A Sugiyama	1	2
10	(Russia) E Maniokova (Georgia (country)) L Meskhi	6	7
(Italy) R Grande (South Africa) J Kruger	2	6^{2}
(Germany) W Probst (United States) D Scott	6	4	6
6	(France) J Halard-Decugis (United States) P Shriver	3	6	2

Third round
1	(United States) G Fernández (Belarus) N Zvereva	6	6
(South Africa) E Reinach (Romania) I Spîrlea	2	3
10	(Russia) E Maniokova (Georgia (country)) L Meskhi	6	6
(Germany) W Probst (United States) D Scott	3	2

Quarterfinals
1	(United States) G Fernández (Belarus) N Zvereva	6	6
10	(Russia) E Maniokova (Georgia (country)) L Meskhi	1	3

==== Section 2 ====
First round
3	(United States) L Davenport (United States) L Raymond	6	7
(Australia) J-A Faull (New Zealand) J Richardson	2	5
(France) A Dechaume-Balleret (Argentina) F Labat	6	6^{4}	6
(United States) A Frazier (Japan) R Hiraki	4	7	2
(Germany) M Babel (Canada) P Hy-Boulais	6	6
WC	(Australia) J Limmer (Australia) A Woolcock	3	2
(Slovakia) K Habšudová (Slovakia) R Zrubáková	6	6
14	(Bulgaria) K Maleeva (Ukraine) N Medvedeva	4	2
(Ukraine) O Lugina (Germany) E Wagner	6	1	10
15	(United States) G Helgeson-Nielsen (Australia) R McQuillan	2	6	8
(United States) L Wild (United States) C Rubin	6	6
(Australia) V Pratt (France) N van Lottum	1	4
(South Africa) M de Swardt (South Africa) L Horn	6	6
(United States) Re Jensen (Japan) H Nagano	3	4
7	(United States) P Fendick (United States) MJ Fernandez	6	6
(Germany) A Huber (United States) Ra Jensen	0	3

Second round
3	(United States) L Davenport (United States) L Raymond	6	6
(France) A Dechaume-Balleret (Argentina) F Labat	3	0
(Germany) M Babel (Canada) P Hy-Boulais	5	3
(Slovakia) K Habšudová (Slovakia) R Zrubáková	7	6
(Ukraine) O Lugina (Germany) E Wagner	2	7	0
(United States) L Wild (United States) C Rubin	6	5	6
(South Africa) M de Swardt (South Africa) L Horn	1	0
7	(United States) P Fendick (United States) MJ Fernandez	6	6

Third round
3	(United States) L Davenport (United States) L Raymond	w/o
(Slovakia) K Habšudová (Slovakia) R Zrubáková
(United States) L Wild (United States) C Rubin	1	1
7	(United States) P Fendick (United States) MJ Fernandez	6	6

Quarterfinals
3	(United States) L Davenport (United States) L Raymond	3	6	6
7	(United States) P Fendick (United States) MJ Fernandez	6	3	3

=== Bottom half ===
==== Section 3 ====
First round
5	(United States) M McGrath (Australia) R Stubbs	6	7
WC	(Australia) K Godridge (Australia) K Sharpe	1	5
(Japan) Y Kamio (Japan) N Kijimuta	1	6	14
(Italy) S Farina (Austria) P Schwarz	6	2	12
(Netherlands) K Boogert (Netherlands) N Muns-Jagerman	7	6
(United Kingdom) V Lake (United Kingdom) C Wood	5	4
9	(Argentina) G Sabatini (Netherlands) B Schultz	7	6
(Germany) B Rittner (Germany) C Schneider	6^{2}	4
12	(United States) D Graham (United States) S Stafford	6	6
(Romania) R Dragomir (Russia) E Likhovtseva	4	4
(Germany) S Hack (Australia) L Pleming	6	6
(United States) A Grossman (United States) J Steven	4	3
(Australia) S Drake-Brockman (Australia) J Taylor	7	6
(Czech Republic) K Kroupová (Slovakia) K Studeníková	6^{3}	4
4	(Netherlands) M Bollegraf (Latvia) L Neiland	6	4	6
(Sweden) Å Carlsson (Japan) E Iida	3	6	1

Second round
5	(United States) M McGrath (Australia) R Stubbs	4	6	6
(Japan) Y Kamio (Japan) N Kijimuta	6	2	0
(Netherlands) K Boogert (Netherlands) N Muns-Jagerman	7	6
9	(Argentina) G Sabatini (Netherlands) B Schultz	5	4
12	(United States) D Graham (United States) S Stafford	6	7
(Germany) S Hack (Australia) L Pleming	0	6^{3}
(Australia) S Drake-Brockman (Australia) J Taylor	4	1
4	(Netherlands) M Bollegraf (Latvia) L Neiland	6	6

Third round
5	(United States) M McGrath (Australia) R Stubbs	1	0^{r}
(Netherlands) K Boogert (Netherlands) N Muns-Jagerman	6	3
12	(United States) D Graham (United States) S Stafford	2	2
4	(Netherlands) M Bollegraf (Latvia) L Neiland	6	6

Quarterfinals
(Netherlands) K Boogert (Netherlands) N Muns-Jagerman	6	3	3
4	(Netherlands) M Bollegraf (Latvia) L Neiland	4	6	6

==== Section 4 ====
First round
8	(United States) L McNeil (Czech Republic) H Suková	6	6
(Netherlands) C Bakkum (China) F Li	2	3
(Sweden) M Lindström (Sweden) M Strandlund	5	7	8
(Russia) E Makarova (Croatia) M Murić	7	5	6
(Japan) M Endo (Japan) N Sawamatsu	6	6
WC	(Australia) A Ellwood (Switzerland) M Hingis	3	3
(France) K Quentrec (France) S Testud	6^{4}	6	6
13	(Indonesia) Y Basuki (Japan) N Miyagi	7	1	2
16	(Spain) C Martínez (Argentina) P Tarabini	6	6
(Australia) N Bradtke (Australia) K Radford	2	4
(Belgium) L Courtois (Belgium) N Feber	6	3	6
(Czech Republic) R Bobková (Czechoslovakia) P Langrová	3	6	2
(Australia) K-A Guse (Czech Republic) A Strnadova	6	6
(Australia) C Barclay (Australia) J Byrne	4	4
2	(Czech Republic) J Novotná (Spain) A Sánchez Vicario	6	6
(France) A Fusai (Belgium) D Monami	3	2

Second round
8	(United States) L McNeil (Czech Republic) H Suková	2	6	6
(Sweden) M Lindström (Sweden) M Strandlund	6	2	3
(Japan) M Endo (Japan) N Sawamatsu	6	3	6
(France) K Quentrec (France) S Testud	3	6	3
16	(Spain) C Martínez (Argentina) P Tarabini	6^{3}	7	6
(Belgium) L Courtois (Belgium) N Feber	7	5	1
(Australia) K-A Guse (Czech Republic) A Strnadova	3	5
2	(Czech Republic) J Novotná (Spain) A Sánchez Vicario	6	7

Third round
8	(United States) L McNeil (Czech Republic) H Suková	6	6
(Japan) M Endo (Japan) N Sawamatsu	2	4
16	(Spain) C Martínez (Argentina) P Tarabini	5	6	5
2	(Czech Republic) J Novotná (Spain) A Sánchez Vicario	7	3	7

Quarterfinals
8	(United States) L McNeil (Czech Republic) H Suková	0	3
2	(Czech Republic) J Novotná (Spain) A Sánchez Vicario	6	6
