= 1995 Australian Open – Mixed doubles =

Mixed doubles
- 1995 Australian Open

Final
- Champions: (Belarus) Natasha Zvereva (United States) Rick Leach
- Runners-up: (United States) Gigi Fernández (Czech Republic) Cyril Suk
- Score: 7–6^{(7–4)}, 6–7^{(3–7)}, 6–4

Details
- Draw: 32
- Seeds: 8

Events
Singles	men	women		boys	girls
Doubles	men	women	mixed	boys	girls
WC Singles	men	women	quad
WC Doubles	men	women	quad
Legends	men	women	mixed
- Australian Open

Larisa Neiland and Andrei Olhovskiy were the defending champions but lost in the first round to Natasha Zvereva and Rick Leach.

Zvereva and Leach won in the final 7–6^{(7–4)}, 6–7^{(3–7)}, 6–4 against Gigi Fernández and Cyril Suk.

== Seeds ==
Champion seeds are indicated in bold text while text in italics indicates the round in which those seeds were eliminated.

1. (United States) Lindsay Davenport / (Canada) Grant Connell (semifinals)
2. (Latvia) Larisa Neiland / (Russia) Andrei Olhovskiy (first round)
3. (United States) Lisa Raymond / (South Africa) David Adams (quarterfinals)
4. (Czech Republic) Helena Suková / (Australia) Todd Woodbridge (semifinals)
5. (United States) Gigi Fernández / (Czech Republic) Cyril Suk (final)
6. (United States) Lori McNeil / (Spain) Javier Sánchez (quarterfinals)
7. (United States) Mary Joe Fernández / (Australia) Sandon Stolle (quarterfinals)
8. (Netherlands) Manon Bollegraf / (Netherlands) Tom Nijssen (first round)

== Draw ==
Key

- Q = Qualifier
- WC = Wild card
- LL = Lucky loser
- Alt = Alternate
- ITF = ITF entry
- PR = Protected ranking
- SR = Special ranking
- SE = Special exempt
- JE = Junior exempt
- JR = Junior Accelerator Programme entrant
- CO = College Accelerator Programme entrant
- NG = Next Gen Accelerator Program entrant
- w/o = Walkover
- r = Retired
- d = Defaulted

=== Final ===
Final
5	(United States) Gigi Fernández (Czech Republic) Cyril Suk	6^{4}	**7^{7}**	4
	(Belarus) **Natasha Zvereva** (United States) **Rick Leach**	**7^{7}**	6^{3}	**6**

=== Top half ===
First round
1	(United States) **L Davenport** (Canada) **G Connell**	**6**	**6**
(Netherlands) K Boogert (Netherlands) M Oosting	1	4
(South Africa) **A Coetzer** (South Africa) **L Bale**	**6**	**6**
(United States) S Stafford (United States) M Keil	3	2
(Netherlands) C Vis (Australia) A Florent	2	2
(United States) **L Harvey-Wild** (United States) **F Montana**	**6**	**6**
WC	(Australia) **N Bradtke** (Australia) **D Cahill**	**6**	2	**8**
8	(Netherlands) M Bollegraf (Netherlands) T Nijssen	3	**6**	6
3	(United States) **L Raymond** (South Africa) **D Adams**	6^{3}	**6**	**8**
WC	(Netherlands) B Schultz (United States) L Jensen	**7^{7}**	4	6
(United States) K Adams (South Africa) B Talbot	5	6^{4}
(United States) **N Arendt** (United States) **G Van Emburgh**	**7**	**7^{7}**
(South Africa) E Reinach (United States) P Galbraith	**6**	4	2
(Canada) **J Hetherington** (South Africa) **J-L de Jager**	4	**6**	**6**
(Australia) K-A Guse (Australia) M Kratzmann	4	4
5	(United States) **G Fernández** (Czech Republic) **C Suk**	**6**	**6**

Second round
1	(United States) **L Davenport** (Canada) **G Connell**	4	**6**	**6**
(South Africa) A Coetzer (South Africa) L Bale	**6**	4	1
(United States) **L Harvey-Wild** (United States) **F Montana**	**6**	**7^{8}**
WC	(Australia) N Bradtke (Australia) D Cahill	4	6^{6}
3	(United States) **L Raymond** (South Africa) **D Adams**	**6**	**6**
(United States) N Arendt (United States) G Van Emburgh	3	2
(Canada) J Hetherington (South Africa) J-L de Jager	2	3
5	(United States) **G Fernández** (Czech Republic) **C Suk**	**6**	**6**

Quarterfinals
1	(United States) **L Davenport** (Canada) **G Connell**	**6**	**7^{7}**
(United States) L Harvey-Wild (United States) F Montana	3	6^{3}
3	(United States) L Raymond (South Africa) D Adams	3	2
5	(United States) **G Fernández** (Czech Republic) **C Suk**	**6**	**6**

Semifinals
1	(United States) L Davenport (Canada) G Connell	1	5
5	(United States) **G Fernández** (Czech Republic) **C Suk**	**6**	**7**

=== Bottom half ===
First round
6	(United States) **L McNeil** (Spain) **J Sánchez**	**6**	**7^{8}**
(Argentina) P Tarabini (United States) D Randall	2	6^{6}
(Australia) **R Stubbs** (United States) **S Davis**	**6**	**6**
WC	(Japan) N Miyagi (United States) K Kinnear	3	4
(Netherlands) M Oremans (Netherlands) H J Davids	6^{4}	3
(Australia) **R McQuillan** (Australia) **D Macpherson**	**7^{7}**	**6**
(United States) M McGrath (Australia) J Fitzgerald	5	3
4	(Czech Republic) **H Suková** (Australia) **T Woodbridge**	**7**	**6**
7	(United States) **M J Fernandez** (Australia) **S Stolle**	**6**	**7^{7}**
(United States) G Helgeson-Nielsen (United Kingdom) N Broad	4	6^{4}
WC	(Australia) **K Radford** (Australia) **P Cash**	4	**7^{7}**	**6**
(Italy) L Golarsa (South Africa) E Ferreira	**6**	6^{2}	1
(United States) P Fendick (United States) M Bauer	6^{4}	**6**	4
(United States) **D Graham** (United States) **S Melville**	**7^{7}**	4	**6**
(Belarus) **N Zvereva** (United States) **R Leach**	**6**	**6**
2	(Latvia) L Neiland (Russia) A Olhovskiy	1	2

Second round
6	(United States) **L McNeil** (Spain) **J Sánchez**	**6**	**7**
(Australia) R Stubbs (United States) S Davis	3	5
(Australia) R McQuillan (Australia) D Macpherson	**6**	4	5
4	(Czech Republic) **H Suková** (Australia) **T Woodbridge**	4	**6**	**7**
7	(United States) **M J Fernandez** (Australia) **S Stolle**	4	**6**	**6**
WC	(Australia) K Radford (Australia) P Cash	**6**	3	4
(United States) D Graham (United States) S Melville	3	4
(Belarus) **N Zvereva** (United States) **R Leach**	**6**	**6**

Quarterfinals
6	(United States) L McNeil (Spain) J Sánchez	2	2
4	(Czech Republic) **H Suková** (Australia) **T Woodbridge**	**6**	**6**
7	(United States) M J Fernandez (Australia) S Stolle	**6**	3	4
(Belarus) **N Zvereva** (United States) **R Leach**	3	**6**	**6**

Semifinals
4	(Czech Republic) H Suková (Australia) T Woodbridge	**6**	2	5
(Belarus) **N Zvereva** (United States) **R Leach**	4	**6**	**7**
