= 1995 Australian Open – Men's singles =

Tennis tournament

Men's singles
- 1995 Australian Open

Final
- Champion: (United States) Andre Agassi
- Runner-up: (United States) Pete Sampras
- Score: 4–6, 6–1, 7–6^{(8–6)}, 6–4

Details
- Draw: 128
- Seeds: 16

Events
| Singles | men | women | | boys | girls |
| Doubles | men | women | mixed | boys | girls |
| WC Singles | men | women | quad |
| WC Doubles | men | women | quad |
| Legends | men | women | mixed |
- Australian Open

Andre Agassi defeated defending champion Pete Sampras in the final, 4–6, 6–1, 7–6^{(8–6)}, 6–4 to win the men's singles tennis title at the 1995 Australian Open. It was his first Australian Open title and third major title overall. Agassi was making his tournament debut.

A memorable moment occurred in the quarterfinal match between Sampras and Jim Courier. Sampras had fought from a two-set deficit to level the match at 2–2. Shortly after winning the first game of the fifth set, Sampras was overcome with grief over his then-coach, Tim Gullikson. (Gullikson had suffered several seizures while touring with Sampras in Europe in late 1994. Shortly before Sampras' match against Courier, Gullikson had collapsed during a practice session after suffering another seizure, with tests proving inconclusive at Epworth Hospital and being flown home to Chicago for further tests.) During the fifth set of the match, Sampras retired to his chair and broke down in tears. When he returned, Courier offered to finish the match the next day. Sampras declined and then won the match. Gullikson was later diagnosed with inoperable brain cancer and died in May 1996.

== Seeds ==
The seeded players are listed below. Andre Agassi is the champion; others show the round in which they were eliminated.

1. (United States) Pete Sampras (final)
2. (United States) Andre Agassi (champion)
3. (Germany) Boris Becker (first round)
4. (Croatia) Goran Ivanišević (first round)
5. (United States) Michael Chang (semifinals)
6. (Sweden) Stefan Edberg (fourth round)
7. (Germany) Michael Stich (third round)
8. (United States) Todd Martin (fourth round)

9. (United States) Jim Courier (quarterfinals)
10. (Russia) Yevgeny Kafelnikov (quarterfinals)
11. (South Africa) Wayne Ferreira (second round)
12. (Switzerland) Marc Rosset (first round)
13. (Ukraine) Andriy Medvedev (quarterfinals)
14. (Austria) Thomas Muster (third round)
15. (Sweden) Magnus Larsson (fourth round)
16. (Netherlands) Richard Krajicek (second round)

Click on the seed number of a player to go to their draw section.

== Draw ==
Key

- Q = Qualifier
- WC = Wild card
- LL = Lucky loser
- Alt = Alternate
- ITF = ITF entry
- PR = Protected ranking
- SR = Special ranking
- SE = Special exempt
- JE = Junior exempt
- JR = Junior Accelerator Programme entrant
- CO = College Accelerator Programme entrant
- NG = Next Gen Accelerator Program entrant
- w/o = Walkover
- r = Retired
- d = Defaulted

=== Finals ===
Quarterfinals
1 | (United States) Pete Sampras | 6^{4} | 6^{3} | 6 | 6 | 6
9 | (United States) Jim Courier | 7^{7} | 7^{7} | 3 | 4 | 3
13 | (Ukraine) Andrei Medvedev | 6^{7} | 5 | 3
5 | (United States) Michael Chang | 7^{9} | 7 | 6
(United States) Aaron Krickstein | 7^{7} | 6 | 5 | 6
(Netherlands) Jacco Eltingh | 6^{3} | 4 | 7 | 4
10 | (Russia) Yevgeny Kafelnikov | 2 | 5 | 0
2 | (United States) Andre Agassi | 6 | 7 | 6

Semifinals
1 | (United States) Pete Sampras | 6^{6} | 6 | 6 | 6
5 | (United States) Michael Chang | 7^{8} | 3 | 4 | 4
(United States) Aaron Krickstein | 4 | 4 | 0^{r}
2 | (United States) Andre Agassi | 6 | 6 | 3

Final
1 | (United States) Pete Sampras | 6 | 1 | 6^{6} | 4
2 | (United States) Andre Agassi | 4 | 6 | 7^{8} | 6

=== Top half ===
==== Section 1 ====
First round
1 | (United States) P Sampras | 6 | 6 | 6
(Italy) G Pozzi | 3 | 2 | 0
Q | (Slovakia) J Krošlák | 6 | 6 | 6^{9} | 4 | 6
(United States) J Palmer | 2 | 2 | 7^{11} | 6 | 0
(Australia) R Fromberg | 6 | 6 | 6
(France) R Gilbert | 4 | 2 | 0
(Sweden) L Jönsson | 6 | 4 | 6 | 7^{7}
(Peru) J Yzaga | 2 | 6 | 4 | 6^{3}
(Netherlands) P Haarhuis | 2 | 1 | 1
(Sweden) T Enqvist | 6 | 6 | 6
Q | (Canada) D Nestor | 3 | 6 | 6 | 7^{7}
(Germany) A Mronz | 6 | 3 | 2 | 6^{0}
(Venezuela) N Pereira | 6 | 7^{7} | 6^{8} | 6
WC | (Australia) S Draper | 2 | 6^{4} | 7^{10} | 4
Q | (United States) B MacPhie | 6^{6} | 6^{1} | 4
15 | (Sweden) M Larsson | 7^{8} | 7^{7} | 6

Second round
1 | (United States) P Sampras | 6 | 6 | 6
Q | (Slovakia) J Krošlák | 2 | 0 | 1
(Australia) R Fromberg | 6 | 6^{4} | 6 | 2
(Sweden) L Jönsson | 7 | 7^{7} | 3 | 6
(Sweden) T Enqvist | 6 | 6 | 7
Q | (Canada) D Nestor | 4 | 4 | 5
(Venezuela) N Pereira | 6^{4} | 4 | 3
15 | (Sweden) M Larsson | 7^{7} | 6 | 6

Third round
1 | (United States) P Sampras | 6 | 6 | 6
(Sweden) L Jönsson | 1 | 2 | 4
(Sweden) T Enqvist
15 | (Sweden) M Larsson | w/o

Fourth round
1 | (United States) P Sampras | 4 | 6^{4} | 7 | 6 | 6
15 | (Sweden) M Larsson | 6 | 7^{7} | 5 | 4 | 4

==== Section 2 ====
First round
9 | (United States) J Courier | 6 | 6 | 7^{7}
(Czech Republic) D Rikl | 4 | 0 | 6^{2}
(Italy) C Caratti | 6 | 6 | 6
(France) L Roux | 3 | 1 | 1
(Australia) M Woodforde | 6 | 7 | 6
(France) A Boetsch | 4 | 5 | 3
(New Zealand) B Steven | 7^{7} | 4 | 6 | 6
(Austria) H Skoff | 6^{1} | 6 | 2 | 3
(United States) B Shelton | 3 | 3 | 6^{6}
(Czech Republic) K Nováček | 6 | 6 | 7^{8}
(United Kingdom) M Petchey | 6 | 3 | 1 | 3
(Czech Republic) R Vašek | 3 | 6 | 6 | 6
(United States) A O'Brien | 4 | 6 | 6 | 6
WC | (Australia) P Cash | 6 | 4 | 4 | 2
(United States) J Tarango | 3 | 1 | 3
7 | (Germany) M Stich | 6 | 6 | 6

Second round
9 | (United States) J Courier | 6 | 6 | 6
(Italy) C Caratti | 2 | 2 | 1
(Australia) M Woodforde | 1 | 6 | 7 | 6
(New Zealand) B Steven | 6 | 3 | 5 | 3
(Czech Republic) K Nováček | 6 | 6 | 6
(Czech Republic) R Vašek | 3 | 3 | 4
(United States) A O'Brien | 0 | 3 | 4
7 | (Germany) M Stich | 6 | 6 | 6

Third round
9 | (United States) J Courier | 6 | 6 | 6
(Australia) M Woodforde | 3 | 3 | 3
(Czech Republic) K Nováček | 7 | 6 | 6
7 | (Germany) M Stich | 5 | 2 | 4

Fourth round
9 | (United States) J Courier | 6 | 6 | 6
(Czech Republic) K Nováček | 2 | 3 | 2

==== Section 3 ====
First round
4 | (Croatia) G Ivanišević | 1 | 6^{4} | 3
(Germany) C-U Steeb | 6 | 7^{7} | 6
(Italy) R Furlan | 7^{7} | 6 | 4 | 7
(Haiti) R Agénor | 6^{0} | 2 | 6 | 5
(Netherlands) J Siemerink | 6 | 7 | 6
(United States) M Washington | 4 | 5 | 2
(United States) D Wheaton | 6 | 7 | 7^{8}
(Germany) J Renzenbrink | 3 | 5 | 6^{6}
(Australia) J Morgan | 7^{7} | 5 | 3 | 6 | 5
(Australia) M Tebbutt | 6^{0} | 7 | 6 | 3 | 7
WC | (Australia) A Ilie | 6^{3} | 2 | 1
(Italy) S Pescosolido | 7^{7} | 6 | 6
(Germany) L Rehmann | 6 | 6 | 6
(Brazil) L Mattar | 3 | 4 | 1
(India) L Paes | 1 | 5 | 6^{4}
13 | (Ukraine) A Medvedev | 6 | 7 | 7^{7}

Second round
(Germany) C-U Steeb | 5 | 3 | 2
(Italy) R Furlan | 7 | 6 | 6
(Netherlands) J Siemerink | 2 | 2 | 2
(United States) D Wheaton | 6 | 6 | 6
(Australia) M Tebbutt | 3 | 4 | 2
(Italy) S Pescosolido | 6 | 6 | 6
(Germany) L Rehmann | 5 | 4 | 1
13 | (Ukraine) A Medvedev | 7 | 6 | 6

Third round
(Italy) R Furlan | 6^{6} | 4 | 3
(United States) D Wheaton | 7^{8} | 6 | 6
(Italy) S Pescosolido | 4 | 3 | 3
13 | (Ukraine) A Medvedev | 6 | 6 | 6

Fourth round
(United States) D Wheaton | 6 | 3 | 4 | 7^{7} | 8
13 | (Ukraine) A Medvedev | 3 | 6 | 6 | 6^{4} | 10

==== Section 4 ====
First round
12 | (Switzerland) M Rosset | 7^{7} | 4 | 3 | 4
(Italy) A Gaudenzi | 6^{4} | 6 | 6 | 6
(Germany) M Zoecke | 4 | 4 | 4
(Russia) A Olhovskiy | 6 | 6 | 6
(France) C Pioline | 6^{7} | 1 | 3
(Sweden) J Apell | 7^{9} | 6 | 6
(France) O Delaître | 3 | 6 | 6 | 6
Q | (Australia) A Naumann | 6 | 3 | 4 | 3
(Czech Republic) M Damm | 5 | 6 | 6 | 6
(Czech Republic) D Vacek | 7 | 4 | 4 | 4
Q | (United States) T Ho | 3 | 6 | 6 | 6
Q | (United States) K Thorne | 6 | 1 | 2 | 4
(United States) B Gilbert | 4 | 4 | 6 | 1
(Morocco) K Alami | 6 | 6 | 2 | 6
WC | (Australia) P Kilderry | 2 | 4 | 7 | 2
5 | (United States) M Chang | 6 | 6 | 5 | 6

Second round
(Italy) A Gaudenzi | 2 | 3 | 3
(Russia) A Olhovskiy | 6 | 6 | 6
(Sweden) J Apell | 6^{2} | 4 | 2
(France) O Delaître | 7^{7} | 6 | 6
(Czech Republic) M Damm | 3 | 3 | 7^{8} | 6 | 6
Q | (United States) T Ho | 6 | 6 | 6^{6} | 3 | 3
(Morocco) K Alami | 3 | 4 | 1
5 | (United States) M Chang | 6 | 6 | 6

Third round
(Russia) A Olhovskiy | 4 | 4 | 2
(France) O Delaître | 6 | 6 | 6
(Czech Republic) M Damm | 3 | 5 | 3
5 | (United States) M Chang | 6 | 7 | 6

Fourth round
(France) O Delaître | 3 | 2 | 4
5 | (United States) M Chang | 6 | 6 | 6

=== Bottom half ===
==== Section 5 ====
First round
6 | (Sweden) S Edberg | 4 | 6 | 7^{7} | 7
WC | (Australia) M Philippoussis | 6 | 3 | 6^{1} | 5
Q | (Romania) A Voinea | 6 | 5 | 7 | 6
(Belgium) F Dewulf | 2 | 7 | 5 | 2
(Germany) H Dreekmann | 6 | 6 | 6
(Spain) J Sánchez | 3 | 2 | 4
WC | (Australia) B Ellwood | 6 | 2 | 6 | 6^{7} | 4
(France) F Santoro | 2 | 6 | 2 | 7^{9} | 6
(Morocco) Y El Aynaoui | 3 | 7^{10} | 1 | 6^{3}
Q | (Germany) L Burgsmüller | 6 | 6^{8} | 6 | 7^{7}
(Czech Republic) P Korda | 2 | 7^{7} | 6 | 6
(France) G Raoux | 6 | 6^{5} | 4 | 3
(United States) A Krickstein | 6 | 6 | 5 | 6
(Germany) M-K Goellner | 3 | 1 | 7 | 1
(Germany) K Braasch | 3 | 7^{12} | 4 | 6^{2}
11 | (South Africa) W Ferreira | 6 | 6^{10} | 6 | 7^{7}

Second round
6 | (Sweden) S Edberg | 6 | 7^{7} | 6
Q | (Romania) A Voinea | 3 | 6^{3} | 4
(Germany) H Dreekmann | 6 | 6 | 6
(France) F Santoro | 3 | 4 | 2
Q | (Germany) L Burgsmüller | 6 | 7 | 4 | 6^{2} | 5
(Czech Republic) P Korda | 2 | 5 | 6 | 7^{7} | 7
(United States) A Krickstein | 6 | 6^{8} | 7^{7} | 6
11 | (South Africa) W Ferreira | 3 | 7^{10} | 6^{4} | 3

Third round
6 | (Sweden) S Edberg | 7^{10} | 6 | 6
(Germany) H Dreekmann | 6^{8} | 2 | 3
(Czech Republic) P Korda | 1 | 4 | 6^{1}
(United States) A Krickstein | 6 | 6 | 7^{7}

Fourth round
6 | (Sweden) S Edberg | 7^{8} | 7 | 4 | 6^{5} | 4
(United States) A Krickstein | 6^{6} | 5 | 6 | 7^{7} | 6

==== Section 6 ====
First round
14 | (Austria) T Muster | 2 | 6 | 7^{7} | 4 | 6
(United States) R Reneberg | 6 | 2 | 6^{4} | 6 | 3
(Australia) J Stoltenberg | 4 | 2 | 2
Q | (France) T Guardiola | 6 | 6 | 6
(Netherlands) J Eltingh | 6 | 7^{7} | 6
(Sweden) M Wilander | 3 | 6^{4} | 4
(Canada) S Lareau | 6 | 3 | 6 | 7^{8}
(United States) S Bryan | 1 | 6 | 4 | 6^{6}
(Australia) T Woodbridge | 6^{4} | 6^{5} | 4
WC | (Australia) W Masur | 7^{7} | 7^{7} | 6
(Germany) D Prinosil | 3 | 6 | 6 | 6
(Zimbabwe) B Black | 6 | 4 | 4 | 2
(Sweden) H Holm | 4 | 7^{7} | 6 | 6^{5} | 3
(United Kingdom) J Bates | 6 | 6^{5} | 3 | 7^{7} | 6
(United States) P McEnroe | 6 | 6 | 7^{7}
3 | (Germany) B Becker | 3 | 4 | 6^{4}

Second round
14 | (Austria) T Muster | 6 | 7^{7} | 6
Q | (France) T Guardiola | 3 | 6^{3} | 2
(Netherlands) J Eltingh | 7^{7} | 5 | 7^{7} | 7
(Canada) S Lareau | 6^{4} | 7 | 6^{5} | 5
WC | (Australia) W Masur | 6^{4} | 3 | 4
(Germany) D Prinosil | 7^{7} | 6 | 6
(United Kingdom) J Bates | 3 | 5 | 3
(United States) P McEnroe | 6 | 7 | 6

Third round
14 | (Austria) T Muster | 3 | 2 | 6 | 5
(Netherlands) J Eltingh | 6 | 6 | 2 | 7
(Germany) D Prinosil | 3 | 2 | 4
(United States) P McEnroe | 6 | 6 | 6

Fourth round
(Netherlands) J Eltingh | 6 | 6 | 6^{7} | 5 | 6
(United States) P McEnroe | 4 | 4 | 7^{9} | 7 | 4

==== Section 7 ====
First round
8 | (United States) T Martin | 6 | 6 | 6
(Germany) O Gross | 3 | 4 | 4
(Slovakia) K Kučera | 6 | 3 | 7 | 6^{0} | 2
(France) J-P Fleurian | 3 | 6 | 5 | 7^{7} | 6
(Germany) B Karbacher | 4 | 0 | r
(United States) V Spadea | 6 | 6
Q | (Australia) G Doyle | 6^{6} | 6 | 1 | 6 | 5
Q | (Zimbabwe) W Black | 7^{8} | 4 | 6 | 1 | 7
(France) G Forget | 6 | 7^{7} | 6
(Austria) G Schaller | 3 | 6^{5} | 3
(Norway) C Ruud | 3 | 3 | 2
(Sweden) J Björkman | 6 | 6 | 6
(Japan) S Matsuoka | 3 | 6^{8} | 6 | 7^{7} | 1
(Denmark) K Carlsen | 6 | 7^{10} | 2 | 6^{3} | 6
(Australia) B Larkham | 3 | 0 | 1
10 | (Russia) Y Kafelnikov | 6 | 6 | 6

Second round
8 | (United States) T Martin | 6 | 6 | 6
(France) J-P Fleurian | 4 | 2 | 3
(United States) V Spadea | 6 | 6 | 6
Q | (Zimbabwe) W Black | 4 | 1 | 0
(France) G Forget | 4 | 6 | 6 | 4 | 3
(Sweden) J Björkman | 6 | 1 | 2 | 6 | 6
(Denmark) K Carlsen | 6 | 3 | 1 | 3
10 | (Russia) Y Kafelnikov | 4 | 6 | 6 | 6

Third round
8 | (United States) T Martin | 6 | 6 | 6
(United States) V Spadea | 3 | 1 | 2
(Sweden) J Björkman | 6 | 1 | 2 | 6^{8}
10 | (Russia) Y Kafelnikov | 4 | 6 | 6 | 7^{10}

Fourth round
8 | (United States) T Martin | 1 | 4 | 2
10 | (Russia) Y Kafelnikov | 6 | 6 | 6

==== Section 8 ====
First round
16 | (Netherlands) R Krajicek | 6 | 6 | 6
Q | (South Africa) C Marsh | 1 | 1 | 1
WC | (Australia) S Stolle | 6 | 2 | 7^{7} | 1 | 2
(South Africa) M Ondruska | 2 | 6 | 6^{5} | 6 | 6
(Switzerland) J Hlasek | 3 | 6 | 7 | 6^{5} | 3
(Australia) P Rafter | 6 | 1 | 5 | 7^{7} | 6
Q | (United States) S Campbell | 6 | 7^{8}
(United States) C Adams | 2 | 6^{6} | r
(Canada) G Rusedski | 6 | 6 | 6
(Russia) A Volkov | 4 | 2 | 3
(United States) J Stark | 4 | 7^{14} | 3 | 3
(Sweden) N Kulti | 6 | 6^{12} | 6 | 6
Q | (France) J Golmard | 6 | 6 | 6
Q | (United States) L Jensen | 2 | 1 | 3
Q | (South Africa) G Stafford | 2 | 4 | 2
2 | (United States) A Agassi | 6 | 6 | 6

Second round
16 | (Netherlands) R Krajicek | 6^{5} | 4 | 3
(South Africa) M Ondruska | 7^{7} | 6 | 6
(Australia) P Rafter | 6 | 7^{7} | 6
Q | (United States) S Campbell | 4 | 6^{1} | 2
(Canada) G Rusedski | 7^{7} | 4 | 2 | 6 | 6
(Sweden) N Kulti | 6^{3} | 6 | 6 | 2 | 3
Q | (France) J Golmard | 2 | 3 | 1
2 | (United States) A Agassi | 6 | 6 | 6

Third round
(South Africa) M Ondruska | 3 | 6 | 6 | 2 | 2
(Australia) P Rafter | 6 | 1 | 3 | 6 | 6
(Canada) G Rusedski | 2 | 4 | 2
2 | (United States) A Agassi | 6 | 6 | 6

Fourth round
(Australia) P Rafter | 3 | 4 | 0
2 | (United States) A Agassi | 6 | 6 | 6

| Preceded by 1994 US Open – Men's singles | Grand Slam men's singles | Succeeded by 1995 French Open – Men's singles |
