= Ashley Naumann =

Australian tennis player

- Full name: Ashley Naumann
- Country (sports): Australia
- Born: 2 July 1970 (age 54); Toowoomba, Queensland, Australia
- Plays: Right-handed
- Prize money: $22,360

Singles
- Career record: 0–2
- Highest ranking: No. 320 (17 July 1995)

Grand Slam singles results
- Australian Open: 1R (1993, 1995)

Doubles
- Career record: 0–1
- Highest ranking: No. 299 (12 June 1995)

Grand Slam doubles results
- Australian Open: 1R (1995)

Ashley Naumann (born 2 July 1970) is a former professional tennis player from Australia.

== Biography ==
A right-handed player from Toowoomba, Naumann played collegiate tennis in the United States for Pepperdine University, before turning professional in 1993.

Naumann appeared in the mains draws at two Australian Open tournaments. At the 1993 Australian Open he received a wildcard and was beaten in four sets by Thierry Champion in the opening round. He won his way through qualifying to return to the main draw at the 1995 Australian Open and in the first round lost another four-set match, to world number 49 Olivier Delaître. In 1995 he also competed in the men's doubles main draw with Andrew Ilie.

Since 2011 he has worked for Tennis Australia, most recently as the Talent Development Manager for Victoria.
