= 1995 Australian Open – Men's doubles =

Tennis tournament

Men's doubles
- 1995 Australian Open

Final
- Champion: (United States) Jared Palmer (United States) Richey Reneberg
- Runner-up: (The Bahamas) Mark Knowles (Canada) Daniel Nestor
- Score: 6–3, 3–6, 6–3, 6–2

Details
- Draw: 64
- Seeds: 16

Events
Singles	men	women		boys	girls
Doubles	men	women	mixed	boys	girls
WC Singles	men	women	quad
WC Doubles	men	women	quad
Legends	men	women	mixed
- Australian Open

The 1995 Australian Open was a tennis tournament played on outdoor hard courts at Flinders Park in Melbourne in Victoria in Australia. It was the 83rd edition of the Australian Open and was held from 16 through 29 January 1995.

== Seeds ==
Champion seeds are indicated in bold text while text in italics indicates the round in which those seeds were eliminated.

1. (Netherlands) Jacco Eltingh / (Netherlands) Paul Haarhuis (semifinals)
2. (Australia) Todd Woodbridge / (Australia) Mark Woodforde (third round)
3. (Zimbabwe) Byron Black / (United States) Jonathan Stark (first round)
4. (Canada) Grant Connell / (United States) Patrick Galbraith (second round)
5. (Sweden) Jan Apell / (Sweden) Jonas Björkman (first round)
6. (South Africa) David Adams / (Russia) Andrei Olhovskiy (second round)
7. (Sweden) Nicklas Kulti / (Sweden) Magnus Larsson (first round)
8. (United States) Alex O'Brien / (Australia) Sandon Stolle (first round)
9. (Czech Republic) Martin Damm / (Czech Republic) Karel Nováček (second round)
10. (Czech Republic) Cyril Suk / (Czech Republic) Daniel Vacek (second round)
11. (Netherlands) Tom Nijssen / (Netherlands) Menno Oosting (first round)
12. (Switzerland) Jakob Hlasek / (Russia) Yevgeny Kafelnikov (quarterfinals)
13. (United States) **Jared Palmer / (United States) Richey Reneberg (champions)**
14. (Sweden) Henrik Holm / (Canada) Sébastien Lareau (second round)
15. (South Africa) Gary Muller / (South Africa) Piet Norval (first round)
16. (Netherlands) Hendrik Jan Davids / (Netherlands) Jan Siemerink (first round)

== Draw ==
Key

- Q = Qualifier
- WC = Wild card
- LL = Lucky loser
- Alt = Alternate
- ITF = ITF entry
- PR = Protected ranking
- SR = Special ranking
- SE = Special exempt
- JE = Junior exempt
- JR = Junior Accelerator Programme entrant
- CO = College Accelerator Programme entrant
- NG = Next Gen Accelerator Program entrant
- w/o = Walkover
- r = Retired
- d = Defaulted

=== Finals ===
Quarterfinals
1	(Netherlands) Jacco Eltingh (Netherlands) Paul Haarhuis	4	6	6	6
(India) Leander Paes (Zimbabwe) Kevin Ullyett	6	3	4	4
13	(United States) Jared Palmer (United States) Richey Reneberg	7	7	6
12	(Switzerland) Jakob Hlasek (Russia) Yevgeny Kafelnikov	6^{1}	6^{4}	3
(Czech Republic) Petr Korda (United States) Patrick McEnroe	6	6	6^{10}	6
(South Africa) Marcos Ondruska (South Africa) Grant Stafford	2	4	7	2
(United States) Rick Leach (United States) Scott Melville	3	4	6	6	14
(The Bahamas) Mark Knowles (Canada) Daniel Nestor	6	6	3	4	16

Semifinals
1	(Netherlands) Jacco Eltingh (Netherlands) Paul Haarhuis	3	4	7	6	5
13	(United States) Jared Palmer (United States) Richey Reneberg	6	6	6^{6}	4	7
(Czech Republic) Petr Korda (United States) Patrick McEnroe	3	6	4	6	4
(The Bahamas) Mark Knowles (Canada) Daniel Nestor	6	2	6	0	6

Final
13	(United States) Jared Palmer (United States) Richey Reneberg	6	3	6	6
(The Bahamas) Mark Knowles (Canada) Daniel Nestor	3	6	3	2

=== Top half ===
==== Section 1 ====
First round
1	(Netherlands) J Eltingh (Netherlands) P Haarhuis	6	6
(United States) K Kinnear (United States) D Wheaton	4	4
(United States) S Davis (United States) B MacPhie	7	7
(Australia) W Arthurs (Sweden) M Tillström	6^{2}	5
(United States) K Jones (United States) D Pate	6	7
(United States) B Dickinson (South Africa) C Ferreira	3	6^{8}
(United States) T Kronemann (Australia) D Macpherson	6	7
15	(South Africa) G Muller (South Africa) P Norval	3	6^{3}
9	(Czech Republic) M Damm (Czech Republic) K Nováček	6	6^{8}	11
(Argentina) L Lobo (Spain) J Sánchez	3	7	9
(India) L Paes (Zimbabwe) K Ullyett	7	6
(South Africa) L Bale (South Africa) J-L de Jager	5	2
(United Kingdom) N Broad (United States) G Van Emburgh	7	7
(Netherlands) T Kempers (United States) J Waite	6^{6}	6^{5}
(Czech Republic) V Flégl (United Kingdom) M Petchey	6	7
8	(United States) A O'Brien (Australia) S Stolle	4	6^{8}

Second round
1	(Netherlands) J Eltingh (Netherlands) P Haarhuis	7	6^{5}	6
(United States) S Davis (United States) B MacPhie	6^{4}	7	3
(United States) K Jones (United States) D Pate	6^{3}	4
(United States) T Kronemann (Australia) D Macpherson	7	6
9	(Czech Republic) M Damm (Czech Republic) K Nováček	4	2
(India) L Paes (Zimbabwe) K Ullyett	6	6
(United Kingdom) N Broad (United States) G Van Emburgh	7	7
(Czech Republic) V Flégl (United Kingdom) M Petchey	5	6^{1}

Third round
1	(Netherlands) J Eltingh (Netherlands) P Haarhuis	4	6	6
(United States) T Kronemann (Australia) D Macpherson	6	3	4
(India) L Paes (Zimbabwe) K Ullyett	7	7
(United Kingdom) N Broad (United States) G Van Emburgh	6^{2}	6^{4}

Quarterfinals
1	(Netherlands) J Eltingh (Netherlands) P Haarhuis	4	6	6	6
(India) L Paes (Zimbabwe) K Ullyett	6	3	4	4

==== Section 2 ====
First round
(Germany) M-K Goellner (Germany) D Prinosil	6	6
3	(Zimbabwe) B Black (United States) J Stark	4	0
(Australia) J Fitzgerald (Australia) P Rafter	7	6^{5}	7
(Italy) C Brandi (Italy) R Furlan	6^{1}	7	5
(Australia) M Kratzmann (New Zealand) B Steven	7	3	6
(France) A Boetsch (France) O Delaître	6^{5}	6	3
13	(United States) J Palmer (United States) R Reneberg	6	6
(South Africa) E Ferreira (United States) D Randall	3	4
12	(Switzerland) J Hlasek (Russia) Y Kafelnikov	6	6
(United States) M Bauer (Czech Republic) D Rikl	3	2
(Australia) A Kratzmann (Australia) M Tebbutt	6	6
(Australia) R Fromberg (Australia) B Larkham	3	4
(Sweden) O Kristiansson (Sweden) L-A Wahlgren	7	6
(Australia) N Borwick (Australia) J Morgan	6^{8}	3
6	(South Africa) D Adams (Russia) A Olhovskiy	6^{5}	6	11
(Australia) J Holmes (Australia) T Larkham	7	3	9

Second round
(Germany) M-K Goellner (Germany) D Prinosil	3	7	3
(Australia) J Fitzgerald (Australia) P Rafter	6	6^{5}	6
(Australia) M Kratzmann (New Zealand) B Steven	5	6	5
13	(United States) J Palmer (United States) R Reneberg	7	4	7
12	(Switzerland) J Hlasek (Russia) Y Kafelnikov	6^{5}	6	7
(Australia) A Kratzmann (Australia) M Tebbutt	7	;3	5
(Sweden) O Kristiansson (Sweden) L-A Wahlgren	4	7	8
6	(South Africa) D Adams (Russia) A Olhovskiy	6	6^{5}	6

Third round
(Australia) J Fitzgerald (Australia) P Rafter	4	6	1
13	(United States) J Palmer (United States) R Reneberg	6	3	6
12	(Switzerland) J Hlasek (Russia) Y Kafelnikov	6	6
(Sweden) O Kristiansson (Sweden) L-A Wahlgren	3	2

Quarterfinals
13	(United States) J Palmer (United States) R Reneberg	7	7	6
12	(Switzerland) J Hlasek (Russia) Y Kafelnikov	6^{1}	6^{4}	3

=== Bottom half ===
==== Section 3 ====
First round
(Czech Republic) P Korda (United States) P McEnroe	7	1	8
5	(Sweden) J Apell (Sweden) J Björkman	6^{2}	6	6
(United States) P Annacone (United States) T Ho	6	7
(Australia) B Ellwood (Australia) M Philippoussis	4	5
(Australia) J Ireland (Belgium) L Pimek	6	4	9
(Malaysia) A Malik (United States) J Tarango	1	6	7
(Sweden) R Bergh (South Africa) B Talbot	6^{3}	6	9
11	(Netherlands) T Nijssen (Netherlands) M Oosting	7	4	7
14	(Sweden) H Holm (Canada) S Lareau	7	6
(France) J-P Fleurian (France) R Gilbert	6^{5}	3
(South Africa) M Ondruska (South Africa) G Stafford	6	6
(United States) F Montana (United States) B Shelton	3	4
(United States) D Johnson (United States) K Thorne	6	6
(Australia) A Ilie (Australia) A Naumann	2	1
4	(Canada) G Connell (United States) P Galbraith	7	6
(Australia) G Doyle (Australia) P Kilderry	5	3

Second round
(Czech Republic) P Korda (United States) P McEnroe	6	6
(United States) P Annacone (United States) T Ho	3	4
(Australia) J Ireland (Belgium) L Pimek	4	5
(Sweden) R Bergh (South Africa) B Talbot	6	7
14	(Sweden) H Holm (Canada) S Lareau	3	4
(South Africa) M Ondruska (South Africa) G Stafford	6	6
(United States) D Johnson (United States) K Thorne	7	6^{6}	6
4	(Canada) G Connell (United States) P Galbraith	6^{6}	7	3

Third round
(Czech Republic) P Korda (United States) P McEnroe	7	6
(Sweden) R Bergh (South Africa) B Talbot	6^{1}	2
(South Africa) M Ondruska (South Africa) G Stafford	6	5	6
(United States) D Johnson (United States) K Thorne	2	7	4

Quarterfinals
(Czech Republic) P Korda (United States) P McEnroe	6	6	6^{10}	6
(South Africa) M Ondruska (South Africa) G Stafford	2	4	7	2

==== Section 4 ====
First round
(Australia) S Draper (Australia) P Tramacchi	6	7
7	(Sweden) N Kulti (Sweden) M Larsson	3	6^{3}
(United States) L Jensen (United States) M Jensen	3	6	11
(United States) M Keil (Sweden) P Nyborg	6	3	9
(United States) R Leach (United States) S Melville	7	6^{1}	7
(Australia) D Cahill (Australia) W Masur	5	7	5
10	(Czech Republic) C Suk (Czech Republic) D Vacek	6	6^{8}	9
(Venezuela) N Pereira (Sweden) M Wilander	4	7	7
(France) G Raoux (United Kingdom) G Rusedski	6	7
16	(Netherlands) HJ Davids (Netherlands) J Siemerink	3	6^{3}
(The Bahamas) M Knowles (Canada) D Nestor	6	6
(South Africa) M Barnard (South Africa) B Haygarth	4	3
(South Africa) C van Rensburg (South Africa) D Visser	6^{6}	6	6
(Australia) J Eagle (Australia) A Florent	7	3	4
2	(Australia) T Woodbridge (Australia) M Woodforde	7	6
(United States) S Cannon (United States) J Pugh	6^{4}	4

Second round
(Australia) S Draper (Australia) P Tramacchi	6	6
(United States) L Jensen (United States) M Jensen	2	4
(United States) R Leach (United States) S Melville	6^{6}	6	8
10	(Czech Republic) C Suk (Czech Republic) D Vacek	7	4	6
(France) G Raoux (United Kingdom) G Rusedski	6	3	1
(The Bahamas) M Knowles (Canada) D Nestor	4	6	6
(South Africa) C van Rensburg (South Africa) D Visser	6	5	5
2	(Australia) T Woodbridge (Australia) M Woodforde	4	7	7

Third round
(Australia) S Draper (Australia) P Tramacchi	7	3	4
(United States) R Leach (United States) S Melville	6^{4}	6	6
(The Bahamas) M Knowles (Canada) D Nestor	6	6
2	(Australia) T Woodbridge (Australia) M Woodforde	3	4

Quarterfinals
(United States) R Leach (United States) S Melville	3	4	6	6	4
(The Bahamas) M Knowles (Canada) D Nestor	6	6	3	0	6
