= Lars Jönsson (tennis) =

Swedish tennis player

- Country (sports): Sweden
- Born: 27 June 1970 (age 56) Gothenburg, Sweden
- Height: 1.88 m (6 ft 2 in)
- Turned pro: 1988
- Plays: Right-handed (two-handed backhand)
- Prize money: US $888,998

Singles
- Career record: 86–131
- Career titles: 0; 3 Challenger, 0 Futures
- Highest ranking: No. 67 (7 October 1991)

Grand Slam singles results
- Australian Open: 4R (1994)
- French Open: 3R (1992)
- Wimbledon: 2R (1991, 1995)
- US Open: 1R (1990, 1992, 1994)

Doubles
- Career record: 2–12
- Career titles: 0; 0 Challenger, 0 Futures
- Highest ranking: No. 387 (4 October 1993)

Lars Jönsson (born 27 June 1970) is a former tennis player from Sweden, who turned professional in 1988. He did not win any ATP title (singles and/or doubles) during his career, best result was a singles final in Wellington. The right-hander reached his highest individual ranking on the ATP Tour on 7 October 1991, when he became ranked 67th in the world.

== ATP career finals ==
=== Singles: 1 (1 runner-up) ===
Legend Grand Slam Tournaments (0–0) ATP World Tour Finals (0–0) ATP World Tour Masters Series (0–0) ATP Championship Series (0–0) ATP World Series (0–1)	Finals by surface Hard (0–1) Clay (0–0) Grass (0–0) Carpet (0–0)	Finals by setting Outdoors (0–1) Indoors (0–0)

Result	W–L	Date	Tournament	Tier	Surface	Opponent	Score
Loss	0–1	Jan 1991	Wellington, New Zealand	World Series	Hard	(Australia) Richard Fromberg	1–6, 4–6, 4–6

== ATP Challenger and ITF Futures finals ==
=== Singles: 4 (3–1) ===
Legend ATP Challenger (3–1) ITF Futures (0–0)	Finals by surface Hard (1–0) Clay (2–1) Grass (0–0) Carpet (0–0)

Result	W–L	Date	Tournament	Tier	Surface	Opponent	Score
Win	1–0	Jul 1989	Tampere, Finland	Challenger	Clay	(Germany) Andres Võsand	7–5, 7–5
Loss	1–1	Jul 1992	Oporto, Portugal	Challenger	Clay	(Spain) Jordi Arrese	6–2, 1–6, 0–6
Win	2–1	Oct 1993	Monterrey, Mexico	Challenger	Hard	(South Africa) Lan Bale	6–2, 6–3
Win	3–1	Sep 1996	Skopje, Macedonia	Challenger	Clay	(Hungary) Jozsef Krocsko	6–3, 6–1

== Performance timeline ==
Key
W	F	SF	QF	#R	RR	Q#	DNQ	A	NH

(W) winner; (F) finalist; (SF) semifinalist; (QF) quarterfinalist; (#R) rounds 4, 3, 2, 1; (RR) round-robin stage; (Q#) qualification round; (DNQ) did not qualify; (A) absent; (NH) not held; (SR) strike rate (events won / competed); (W–L) win–loss record.

=== Singles ===
Tournament	1989	1990	1991	1992	1993	1994	1995	1996	1997	1998	1999	SR	W–L	Win %
Grand Slam tournaments
Australian Open	A	3R	1R	1R	1R	4R	3R	1R	1R	Q2	Q1	0 / 8	7–8	47%
French Open	A	1R	2R	3R	1R	2R	Q2	Q1	Q1	Q1	A	0 / 5	4–5	44%
Wimbledon	A	1R	2R	1R	1R	1R	2R	A	A	A	A	0 / 6	2–6	25%
US Open	A	1R	A	1R	A	1R	A	A	A	A	A	0 / 3	0–3	0%
Win–loss	0–0	2–4	2–3	2–4	0–3	4–4	3–2	0–1	0–1	0–0	0–0	0 / 22	13–22	37%
ATP World Tour Masters 1000
Indian Wells	A	A	A	A	A	Q2	Q1	A	A	A	A	0 / 0	0–0	–
Miami	A	A	A	A	A	A	1R	A	A	A	A	0 / 1	0–1	0%
Monte Carlo	1R	1R	A	A	Q1	1R	A	Q3	Q2	A	A	0 / 3	0–3	0%
Hamburg	A	3R	A	A	2R	A	A	A	A	A	A	0 / 2	1–2	33%
Rome	A	A	A	1R	A	A	A	A	A	A	A	0 / 1	0–1	0%
Paris	A	A	A	A	A	A	A	Q1	A	A	A	0 / 0	0–0	–
Win–loss	0–1	1–2	0–0	0–1	0–1	0–1	0–1	0–0	0–0	0–0	0–0	0 / 7	1–7	13%
