= Daniel Courcol =

French tennis player

- Country (sports): France
- Residence: Paris
- Born: 26 April 1969 (age 55); Boulogne-sur-Mer, France
- Height: 6 ft 3 in (191 cm)
- Turned pro: 1993
- Plays: Right-handed
- Prize money: $62,945

Singles
- Career record: 2–4
- Career titles: 0
- Highest ranking: No. 166 (11 March 1996)

Grand Slam singles results
- French Open: 1R (1995)

Doubles
- Career record: 0–3
- Career titles: 0
- Highest ranking: No. 314 (10 July 1995)

Grand Slam doubles results
- French Open: 1R (1995)

Daniel Courcol (born 26 April 1969) is a former professional tennis player from France.

Courcol was a leading collegiate player for Mississippi State during the early 1990s. He is the only man from the university to have reached number one in both singles and doubles. The right-hander was an All-American for doubles in 1991, for singles in 1992 and for both in 1993.

After turning professional, Courcol competed in the ATP Tour. He took part in one Grand Slam event, the 1995 French Open. In the singles he was beaten in four sets by Bernd Karbacher in the opening round. He was also eliminated in the first round of the men's doubles, with Courcol and his partner Gérard Solvès having to face second seeds and eventual champions Jacco Eltingh and Paul Haarhuis. The Frenchman had his best win on tour at Queen's in 1996, defeating world number 64 Adrian Voinea, before being beaten in the second round by Jonathan Stark.

He is the son of Jean-Pierre Courcol, who reached the second round of the French Open on three occasions and went on to become a successful businessman.
