= 1995 Australian Open =

- Date: 16–29 January 1995
- Edition: 83rd
- Category: Grand Slam (ITF)
- Surface: Hardcourt (Rebound Ace)
- Location: Melbourne, Australia
- Venue: National Tennis Centre at Flinders Park

Champions

Men's singles
- (United States) Andre Agassi

Women's singles
- (France) Mary Pierce

Men's doubles
- (United States) Jared Palmer / (United States) Richey Reneberg

Women's doubles
- (Czech Republic) Jana Novotná / (Spain) Arantxa Sánchez Vicario

Mixed doubles
- (Belarus) Natasha Zvereva / (United States) Rick Leach

Boys' singles
- (Germany) Nicolas Kiefer

Girls' singles
- (Australia) Siobhan Drake-Brockman

Boys' doubles
- (Australia) Luke Bourgeios / (South Korea) Jong-Min Lee

Girls' doubles
- (United States) Corina Morariu / (Czech Republic) Ludmila Varmužová
- Australian Open

The 1995 Australian Open was a tennis tournament played on outdoor hard courts at Flinders Park in Melbourne in Victoria in Australia. It was the 83rd edition of the Australian Open and was held from 16 through 29 January 1995.

Shortly after the semifinal between Andre Agassi and Aaron Krickstein, the court flooded.

== Seniors ==
=== Men's singles ===
(United States) Andre Agassi defeated (United States) Pete Sampras 4–6, 6–1, 7–6^{(8–6)}, 6–4

- It was Agassi's 3rd career Grand Slam title and his 1st Australian Open title.

=== Women's singles ===
(France) Mary Pierce defeated (Spain) Arantxa Sánchez Vicario 6–3, 6–2

- It was Pierce's 1st career Grand Slam title and her only Australian Open title.

=== Men's doubles ===
(United States) Jared Palmer / (United States) Richey Reneberg defeated (The Bahamas) Mark Knowles / (Canada) Daniel Nestor 6–3, 3–6, 6–3, 6–2

- It was Palmer's 1st career Grand Slam title and his only Australian Open title. It was Reneberg's 2nd and last career Grand Slam title and his only Australian Open title.

=== Women's doubles ===
(Czech Republic) Jana Novotná / (Spain) Arantxa Sánchez Vicario defeated (United States) Gigi Fernández / (Belarus) Natasha Zvereva 6–3, 6–7^{(3–7)}, 6–4

- It was Novotná's 11th career Grand Slam title and her 4th and last Australian Open title. It was Sánchez Vicario's 10th career Grand Slam title and her 3rd Australian Open title.

=== Mixed doubles ===
(Belarus) Natasha Zvereva / (United States) Rick Leach defeated (United States) Gigi Fernández / (Czech Republic) Cyril Suk 7–6^{(7–4)}, 6–7^{(3–7)}, 6–4

- It was Zvereva's 14th career Grand Slam title and her 3rd Australian Open title. It was Leach's 6th career Grand Slam title and his 3rd Australian Open title.

== Juniors ==
=== Boys' singles ===
(Germany) Nicolas Kiefer defeated (South Korea) Lee Jong-min 6–4, 6–4

=== Girls' singles ===
(Australia) Siobhan Drake-Brockman defeated (Australia) Annabel Ellwood 6–3, 4–6, 7–5

=== Boys' doubles ===
(Australia) Luke Bourgeois / (South Korea) Lee Jong-min defeated (Germany) Nicolas Kiefer / (Germany) Ulrich Jasper Seetzen 6–2, 6–1

=== Girls' doubles ===
(United States) Corina Morariu / (Czech Republic) Ludmila Varmužová defeated (Japan) Saori Obata / (Japan) Nami Urabe 6–1, 6–2

Preceded by 1994 US Open	Grand Slams	Succeeded by 1995 French Open
