= 1994 Wimbledon Championships – Girls' singles =

Girls' singles
- 1994 Wimbledon Championships

Final
- Champion: (Switzerland) Martina Hingis
- Runner-up: (South Korea) Jeon Mi-ra
- Score: 7–5, 6–4

Events
| Singles | men | women | | boys | girls |
| Doubles | men | women | mixed | boys | girls |
| WC Singles | men | women | quad |
| WC Doubles | men | women | quad |
| Legends | men | women | seniors |
| ← 1993 · | Wimbledon Championships | · 1995 → |

Martina Hingis defeated Jeon Mi-ra in the final, 7–5, 6–4 to win the girls' singles tennis title at the 1994 Wimbledon Championships.

== Seeds ==
1. (United Kingdom) Amanda Wainwright (first round)
2. (Madagascar) Dally Randriantefy (second round)
3. (Austria) Melanie Schnell (quarterfinals)
4. (Australia) Annabel Ellwood (third round)
5. (South Korea) Jeon Mi-ra (final)
6. (Slovakia) Zuzana Nemšáková (semifinals)
7. (Russia) Tatiana Panova (third round)
8. (Switzerland) Martina Hingis (champion)
9. (Slovakia) Henrieta Nagyová (first round)
10. (Canada) Sonya Jeyaseelan (third round)
11. (France) Amélie Castéra (semifinals)
12. n/a
13. (Netherlands) Yvette Basting (second round)
14. (Hungary) Petra Mandula (second round)
15. (Australia) Siobhan Drake-Brockman (second round)
16. (Brazil) Miriam D'Agostini (first round)

Click on the seed number of a player to go to their draw section.

== Draw ==
=== Key ===
- Q = Qualifier
- WC = Wild card
- LL = Lucky loser
- Alt = Alternate
- SE = Special exempt
- PR = Protected ranking
- ITF = ITF entry
- JE = Junior exempt
- w/o = Walkover
- r = Retired
- d = Defaulted
- SR = Special ranking

=== Finals ===
Quarterfinals
(Russia) Anna Kournikova | 4 | 4
8 | (Switzerland) Martina Hingis | 6 | 6
(Austria) Melanie Schnell | 6 | 2 | 4
11 | (France) Amélie Castéra | 4 | 6 | 6
5 | (South Korea) Jeon Mi-ra | 6 | 1 | 6
(Republic of Ireland) Karen Nugent | 1 | 6 | 4
6 | (Slovakia) Zuzana Nemšáková | 7 | 6
(Netherlands) Chantal Reuter | 5 | 4

Semifinals
8 | (Switzerland) Martina Hingis | 3 | 6 | 6
11 | (France) Amélie Castéra | 6 | 4 | 1
5 | (South Korea) Jeon Mi-ra | 6 | 6
6 | (Slovakia) Zuzana Nemšáková | 4 | 1

Final
8 | (Switzerland) Martina Hingis | 7 | 6
5 | (South Korea) Jeon Mi-ra | 5 | 4

=== Top half ===
==== Section 1 ====
First round
1 | (United Kingdom) Amanda Wainwright | 2 | 2
(Hungary) Réka Vidáts | 6 | 6
(United States) Amanda Basica | 6 | 7 | 6
(Slovakia) Tatiana Zelenayová | 7 | 5 | 4
(South Africa) Nannie de Villiers | 4 | 7 | 5
(Russia) Anna Kournikova | 6 | 5 | 7
(Germany) Syna Schmidle | 1 | 6 | 4
15 | (Australia) Siobhan Drake-Brockman | 6 | 3 | 6
16 | (Brazil) Miriam D'Agostini | 1 | 3
(Spain) Magüi Serna | 6 | 6
(United Kingdom) Joanne Moore | 6 | 6
(Madagascar) Natacha Randriantefy | 2 | 1
(Canada) Vanessa Webb | 6 | 6
(Philippines) Francesca La'O | 2 | 4
(Zimbabwe) Cara Black | 6 | 2 | 3
8 | (Switzerland) Martina Hingis | 2 | 6 | 6

Second round
(Hungary) R Vidáts | 2 | 7 | 3
(United States) A Basica | 6 | 6 | 6
(Russia) A Kournikova | 6 | 6
15 | (Australia) S Drake-Brockman | 4 | 4
(Spain) M Serna | 6 | 6
(United Kingdom) J Moore | 1 | 1
(Canada) V Webb | 5 | 3
8 | (Switzerland) M Hingis | 7 | 6

Third round
(United States) A Basica | 5 | 6
(Russia) A Kournikova | 7 | 7
(Spain) M Serna | 4 | 2
8 | (Switzerland) M Hingis | 6 | 6

Quarterfinals
(Russia) A Kournikova | 4 | 3
8 | (Switzerland) M Hingis | 6 | 6

==== Section 2 ====
First round
3 | (Austria) Melanie Schnell | 6 | 6
(Thailand) Atchara Wannachinda | 1 | 2
(Japan) Saori Obata | 5 | 5
(United States) Corina Morariu | 7 | 7
(Hungary) Kira Nagy | 5 | 5
(United Kingdom) Katia Roubanova | 7 | 7
(Poland) Magdalena Grzybowska | 6 | 2 | 6
9 | (Slovakia) Henrieta Nagyová | 0 | 6 | 1
11 | (France) Amélie Castéra | 6 | 6
(Argentina) Maria Noel Losada | 4 | 0
(San Marino) Ludmila Varmužová | 6 | 2 | 6
(United States) Stephanie Nickitas | 3 | 6 | 1
(Colombia) Carmiña Giraldo | 6 | 3 | 5
(Mexico) Graciela Vélez | 2 | 6 | 7
(Czech Republic) Anna Monhartová | 1 | 6 | 2
7 | (Russia) Tatiana Panova | 6 | 4 | 6

Second round
3 | (Austria) M Schnell | 7 | 6
(United States) C Morariu | 5 | 4
(United Kingdom) E Roubanova | 4 | 4
(Poland) M Grzybowska | 6 | 6
11 | (France) A Castéra | 6 | 6
(San Marino) L Varmužová | 0 | 4
(Mexico) G Vélez | 6 | 3
7 | (Russia) T Panova | 7 | 6

Third round
3 | (Austria) M Schnell | 6 | 6
(Poland) M Grzybowska | 4 | 4
11 | (France) A Castéra | 6 | 6
7 | (Russia) T Panova | 2 | 1

Quarterfinals
(Austria) M Schnell | 6 | 2 | 4
11 | (France) A Castéra | 4 | 6 | 6

=== Bottom half ===
==== Section 3 ====
First round
5 | (South Korea) Jeon Mi-ra | 4 | 6 | 6
(South Africa) Liezel Horn | 6 | 2 | 1
(Hungary) Katalin Marosi | 6 | 1 | 6
(United Kingdom) Lorna Woodroffe | 3 | 6 | 3
(France) Anne Pastor | 2 | 1
(United States) Meilen Tu | 6 | 6
(Poland) Aleksandra Olsza | 1 | 1
13 | (Netherlands) Yvette Basting | 6 | 6
(Republic of Ireland) Karen Nugent | 6 | 6
(Japan) Nami Urabe | 4 | 1
(Slovakia) Martina Nedelková | 4 | 4
(Russia) Anna Linkova | 6 | 6
(Switzerland) Manuela Schwerzmann | 6 | 2 | 5
(United Kingdom) Megan Miller | 3 | 6 | 7
(Malaysia) Chiew Chern-Yi | 0 | 0^{r}
4 | (Australia) Annabel Ellwood | 6 | 2

Second round
5 | (South Korea) M-r Jeon | 6 | 6
(Hungary) K Marosi | 0 | 2
(United States) M Tu | 6 | 6
13 | (Netherlands) Y Basting | 1 | 3
(Republic of Ireland) K Nugent | 6 | 6
(Russia) A Linkova | 1 | 2
(United Kingdom) M Miller | 1 | 0
4 | (Australia) A Ellwood | 6 | 6

Third round
5 | (South Korea) M-r Jeon | 6 | 7
(United States) M Tu | 3 | 6
(Republic of Ireland) K Nugent | 6 | 2 | 6
4 | (Australia) A Ellwood | 3 | 6 | 4

Quarterfinals
5 | (South Korea) M-r Jeon | 6 | 1 | 6
(Republic of Ireland) K Nugent | 1 | 6 | 4

==== Section 4 ====
First round
6 | (Slovakia) Zuzana Nemšáková | 6 | 6
(India) Nirupama Vaidyanathan | 3 | 2
(Chile) Macarena Álvarez | 1 | 1
(United States) Stephanie Halsell | 6 | 6
(Austria) Barbara Schwartz | 1 | 3
(Australia) Trudi Musgrave | 6 | 6
(Slovakia) Michaela Hasanová | 3 | 4
10 | (Canada) Sonya Jeyaseelan | 6 | 6
14 | (Hungary) Petra Mandula | 6 | 6
(United Kingdom) Zoe Mellis | 4 | 3
(United Kingdom) Lizzie Jelfs | 2 | 5
(Netherlands) Chantal Reuter | 6 | 7
(United States) Cristina Moros | 7 | 6
(Japan) Haruka Inoue | 6 | 4
(South Africa) Surina de Beer | 6 | 3 | 4
2 | (Madagascar) Dally Randriantefy | 3 | 6 | 6

Second round
6 | (Slovakia) Z Nemšáková | 7 | 6
(United States) S Halsell | 5 | 4
(Australia) T Musgrave | 2 | 3
10 | (Canada) S Jeyaseelan | 6 | 6
14 | (Hungary) P Mandula | 4 | 3
(Netherlands) C Reuter | 6 | 6
(United States) C Moros | 7 | 1 | 6
2 | (Madagascar) D Randriantefy | 6 | 6 | 4

Third round
6 | (Slovakia) Z Nemšáková | 6 | 6
10 | (Canada) S Jeyaseelan | 3 | 3
(Netherlands) C Reuter | 6 | 6
(United States) C Moros | 2 | 3

Quarterfinals
6 | (Slovakia) Z Nemšáková | 7 | 6
(Netherlands) C Reuter | 5 | 4
