= 1994 Wimbledon Championships – Girls' doubles =

Girls' doubles
- 1994 Wimbledon Championships

Final
- Champions: (South Africa) Nannie de Villiers (United Kingdom) Lizzie Jelfs
- Runners-up: (United States) Corina Morariu (San Marino) Ludmila Varmužová
- Score: 6–3, 6–4

Events
Singles	men	women		boys	girls
Doubles	men	women	mixed	boys	girls
WC Singles	men	women	quad
WC Doubles	men	women	quad
Legends	men	women	seniors
← 1993 ·	Wimbledon Championships	· 1995 →

Nannie de Villiers and Lizzie Jelfs defeated Corina Morariu and Ludmila Varmužová in the final, 6–3, 6–4 to win the girls' doubles tennis title at the 1994 Wimbledon Championships.

== Seeds ==
1. (Slovakia) Michaela Hasanová / (Slovakia) Martina Nedelková (first round)
2. (United States) Corina Morariu / (San Marino) Ludmila Varmužová (final)
3. (United States) Cristina Moros / (United States) Stephanie Nickitas (quarterfinals)
4. (Switzerland) Martina Hingis / (Slovakia) Henrieta Nagyová (second round)
5. (South Korea) Jeon Mi-ra / (Philippines) Francesca La'O (quarterfinals)
6. (South Africa) Nannie de Villiers / (United Kingdom) Lizzie Jelfs (champions)
7. (United States) Amanda Basica / (United States) Meilen Tu (second round)
8. (Colombia) Carmiña Giraldo / (Argentina) Maria Noel Losada (first round)

== Draw ==
=== Key ===
- Q = Qualifier
- WC = Wild card
- LL = Lucky loser
- Alt = Alternate
- SE = Special exempt
- PR = Protected ranking
- ITF = ITF entry
- JE = Junior exempt
- w/o = Walkover
- r = Retired
- d = Defaulted
- SR = Special ranking

=== Finals ===
Semifinals
(Japan) Saori Obata (Japan) Nami Urabe	5	1
6	(South Africa) Nannie de Villiers (United Kingdom) Lizzie Jelfs	7	6
(France) Amélie Castéra (France) Anne Pastor	3	2
2	(United States) Corina Morariu (San Marino) Ludmila Varmužová	6	6

Final
6	(South Africa) Nannie de Villiers (United Kingdom) Lizzie Jelfs	6	6
2	(United States) Corina Morariu (San Marino) Ludmila Varmužová	3	4

=== Top half ===
First round
1	(Slovakia) Michaela Hasanová (Slovakia) Martina Nedelková	1	4
(Netherlands) Yvette Basting (Australia) Siobhan Drake-Brockman	6	6
(Russia) Anna Kournikova (Russia) Tatiana Panova	6	6
(Chile) Macarena Álvarez (Mexico) Graciela Vélez	3	4
(Japan) Haruka Inoue (Hungary) Kira Nagy	4	6	1
(Japan) Saori Obata (Japan) Nami Urabe	6	2	6
(United States) Stephanie Halsell (South Africa) Liezel Horn	6	6
8	(Colombia) Carmiña Giraldo (Argentina) Maria Noel Losada	3	2
3	(United States) Cristina Moros (United States) Stephanie Nickitas	6	6
(United Kingdom) Frances Hearn (United Kingdom) Zoe Mellis	4	4
(Republic of Ireland) Karen Nugent (United Kingdom) Amanda Wainwright	4	6	3
(Poland) Magdalena Grzybowska (Poland) Aleksandra Olsza	6	3	6
(United Kingdom) Elizabeth Fletcher (United Kingdom) Lorna Woodroffe	5	6
(Slovakia) Zuzana Nemšáková (Slovakia) Tatiana Zelenayová	7	7
(United Kingdom) Megan Miller (Switzerland) Manuela Schwerzmann	1	6
6	(South Africa) Nannie de Villiers (United Kingdom) Lizzie Jelfs	6	7

Second round
(Netherlands) Y Basting (Australia) S Drake-Brockman	2	3
(Russia) A Kournikova (Russia) T Panova	6	6
(Japan) S Obata (Japan) N Urabe	1	6	6
(United States) S Halsell (South Africa) L Horn	6	3	1
3	(United States) C Moros (United States) S Nickitas	2	6	6
(Poland) M Grzybowska (Poland) A Olsza	6	4	0
(Slovakia) Z Nemšáková (Slovakia) T Zelenayová	0	3
6	(South Africa) N de Villiers (United Kingdom) E Jelfs	6	6

Quarterfinals
(Russia) A Kournikova (Russia) T Panova	4	6	4
(Japan) S Obata (Japan) N Urabe	6	3	6
3	(United States) C Moros (United States) S Nickitas	6	5	6
6	(South Africa) N de Villiers (United Kingdom) E Jelfs	4	7	8

Semifinals
(Japan) S Obata (Japan) N Urabe	5	1
6	(South Africa) N de Villiers (United Kingdom) E Jelfs	7	6

=== Bottom half ===
First round
7	(United States) Amanda Basica (United States) Meilen Tu	6	7
(Austria) Melanie Schnell (Austria) Barbara Schwartz	0	6
(Brazil) Miriam D'Agostini (United Kingdom) Joanne Moore	1	1
(United States) Varalee Sureephong (Canada) Vanessa Webb	6	6
(Madagascar) Dally Randriantefy (Madagascar) Natacha Randriantefy	5	6	4
(France) Amélie Castéra (France) Anne Pastor	7	3	6
(Zimbabwe) Cara Black (India) Nirupama Vaidyanathan	1	7	2
4	(Switzerland) Martina Hingis (Slovakia) Henrieta Nagyová	6	5	6
5	(South Korea) Jeon Mi-ra (Philippines) Francesca La'O	3	6	6
(Australia) Annabel Ellwood (Australia) Trudi Musgrave	6	4	4
(Malaysia) Chiew Chern-Yi (Thailand) Atchara Wannachinda	0	0
(South Africa) Surina de Beer (Russia) Anna Linkova	6	6
(Hungary) Petra Mandula (Hungary) Katalin Marosi	3	3
(Netherlands) Chantal Reuter (Spain) Magüi Serna	6	6
(United Kingdom) Julie Dawson (United Kingdom) Katia Roubanova	1	1
2	(United States) Corina Morariu (San Marino) Ludmila Varmužová	6	6

Second round
7	(United States) A Basica (United States) M Tu	6	1
(United States) V Sureephong (Canada) V Webb	7	6
(France) A Castéra (France) A Pastor	6	0	6
(Switzerland) M Hingis (Slovakia) H Nagyová	4	6	2
5	(South Korea) M-r Jeon (Philippines) F La'O	3	7	6
(South Africa) S de Beer (Russia) A Linkova	6	5	1
(Netherlands) C Reuter (Spain) M Serna	4	5
2	(United States) C Morariu (San Marino) L Varmužová	6	7

Quarterfinals
(United States) V Sureephong (Canada) V Webb	6	4	2
(France) A Castéra (France) A Pastor	3	6	6
5	(South Korea) M-r Jeon (Philippines) F La'O	5	4
2	(United States) C Morariu (San Marino) L Varmužová	7	6

Semifinals
(France) A Castéra (France) A Pastor	3	2
2	(United States) C Morariu (San Marino) L Varmužová	6	6
