= 1994 US Open (tennis) =

- Date: August 29 – September 11
- Edition: 114th
- Category: Grand Slam (ITF)
- Surface: Hardcourt
- Location: New York City, New York, United States

Champions

Men's singles
- (United States) Andre Agassi

Women's singles
- (Spain) Arantxa Sánchez Vicario

Men's doubles
- (Netherlands) Jacco Eltingh / (Netherlands) Paul Haarhuis

Women's doubles
- (Czech Republic) Jana Novotná / (Spain) Arantxa Sánchez Vicario

Mixed doubles
- (South Africa) Elna Reinach / (United States) Patrick Galbraith

Boys' singles
- (Netherlands) Sjeng Schalken

Girls' singles
- (United States) Meilen Tu

Boys' doubles
- (Australia) Ben Ellwood / (Ecuador) Nicolás Lapentti

Girls' doubles
- (South Africa) Surina de Beer / (Netherlands) Chantal Reuter
← 1993 ·	US Open	· 1995 →

The 1994 US Open was a tennis tournament played on outdoor hard courts at the USTA National Tennis Center in New York City in New York in the United States. It was the 114th edition of the US Open and was held from August 29 to September 11, 1994.

== Seniors ==
=== Men's singles ===
(United States) Andre Agassi defeated (Germany) Michael Stich 6–1, 7–6^{(7–5)}, 7–5

- It was Agassi's 2nd career Grand Slam singles title and his 1st US Open singles title. He became the first unseeded US Open champion in the Open Era.

=== Women's singles ===
(Spain) Arantxa Sánchez Vicario defeated (Germany) Steffi Graf 1–6, 7–6^{(7–3)}, 6–4

- It was Sánchez Vicario's 3rd career Grand Slam singles title and her only US Open singles title. She became the first Spanish woman to win a US Open singles title.

=== Men's doubles ===
(Netherlands) Jacco Eltingh / (Netherlands) Paul Haarhuis defeated (Australia) Todd Woodbridge / (Australia) Mark Woodforde 6–3, 7–6^{(7–1)}

- It was Eltingh's 2nd career Grand Slam title and his only US Open title. It was Haarhuis' 2nd career Grand Slam title and his only US Open title.

=== Women's doubles ===
(Czech Republic) Jana Novotná / (Spain) Arantxa Sánchez Vicario defeated (Bulgaria) Katerina Maleeva / (United States) Robin White 6–3, 6–3

- It was Novotná's 10th career Grand Slam title and her 2nd US Open title. It was Sánchez Vicario's 6th career Grand Slam title and her 3rd and last US Open title.

=== Mixed doubles ===
(South Africa) Elna Reinach / (United States) Patrick Galbraith defeated (Czech Republic) Jana Novotná / (Australia) Todd Woodbridge 6–2, 6–4

- It was Reinach's only career Grand Slam title. It was Galbraith's 1st career Grand Slam title and his 1st US Open title.

== Juniors ==
=== Boys' singles ===
(Netherlands) Sjeng Schalken defeated (Morocco) Mehdi Tahiri 6–2, 7–6

=== Girls' singles ===
(United States) Meilen Tu defeated (Switzerland) Martina Hingis 6–2, 6–4

=== Boys' doubles ===
(Australia) Ben Ellwood / (Ecuador) Nicolás Lapentti defeated (United States) Paul Goldstein / (United States) Scott Humphries 6–2, 6–0

=== Girls' doubles ===
(South Africa) Surina de Beer / (Netherlands) Chantal Reuter defeated (South Africa) Nannie de Villiers / (United Kingdom) Lizzie Jelfs 4–6, 6–4, 6–2

Preceded by 1994 Wimbledon Championships	Grand Slams	Succeeded by 1995 Australian Open
