= 1994 Wimbledon Championships =

- Date: 20 June – 3 July
- Edition: 108th
- Category: Grand Slam (ITF)
- Draw: 128S/64D/64XD
- Prize money: £5,682,170
- Surface: Grass
- Location: Church Road; SW19, Wimbledon, London, United Kingdom
- Venue: All England Lawn Tennis and Croquet Club

Champions

Men's singles
- (United States) Pete Sampras

Women's singles
- (Spain) Conchita Martínez

Men's doubles
- (Australia) Todd Woodbridge / (Australia) Mark Woodforde

Women's doubles
- (United States) Gigi Fernández / (Belarus) Natasha Zvereva

Mixed doubles
- (Australia) Todd Woodbridge / (Czech Republic) Helena Suková

Boys' singles
- (United States) Scott Humphries

Girls' singles
- (Switzerland) Martina Hingis

Boys' doubles
- (Australia) Ben Ellwood / (Australia) Mark Philippoussis

Girls' doubles
- (South Africa) Nannie de Villiers / (United Kingdom) Lizzie Jelfs
← 1993 ·	Wimbledon Championships	· 1995 →

The 1994 Wimbledon Championships was a tennis tournament played on grass courts at the All England Lawn Tennis and Croquet Club in Wimbledon, London in the United Kingdom. It was the 108th edition of the Wimbledon Championships and were held from 20 June to 3 July 1994.

== Prize money ==
The total prize money for 1994 championships was £5,682,170. The winner of the men's title earned £345,000 while the women's singles champion earned £310,000.

Event	W	F	SF	QF	Round of 16	Round of 32	Round of 64	Round of 128
Men's singles	£345,000							
Women's singles	£310,000							
Men's doubles *	£141,350							—
Women's doubles *	£122,200							—
Mixed doubles *	£60,000							—

_{* per team}

== Champions ==
=== Seniors ===
==== Men's singles ====
(United States) Pete Sampras defeated (Croatia) Goran Ivanišević, 7–6^{(7–2)}, 7–6^{(7–5)}, 6–0

- It was Sampras' 5th career Grand Slam singles title and his 2nd (consecutive) title at Wimbledon.

==== Women's singles ====
(Spain) Conchita Martínez defeated (United States) Martina Navratilova, 6–4, 3–6, 6–3

- It was Martínez's 1st and only career Grand Slam singles title. She became the 1st Spanish woman to win the Wimbledon singles title.

==== Men's doubles ====
(Australia) Todd Woodbridge / (Australia) Mark Woodforde defeated (Canada) Grant Connell / (United States) Patrick Galbraith, 7–6^{(7–3)}, 6–3, 6–1

- It was Woodbridge's 6th career Grand Slam title and his 2nd Wimbledon title. It was Woodforde's 7th career Grand Slam title and his 2nd Wimbledon title.

==== Women's doubles ====
(United States) Gigi Fernández / (Belarus) Natasha Zvereva defeated (Czech Republic) Jana Novotná / (Spain) Arantxa Sánchez Vicario, 6–4, 6–1

- It was Fernández's 12th career Grand Slam title and her 3rd Wimbledon title. It was Zvereva's 13th career Grand Slam title and her 4th Wimbledon title.

==== Mixed doubles ====
(Australia) Todd Woodbridge / (Czech Republic) Helena Suková defeated (United States) T. J. Middleton / (United States) Lori McNeil, 3–6, 7–5, 6–3

- It was Woodbridge's 7th career Grand Slam title and his 3rd Wimbledon title. It was Suková's 11th career Grand Slam title and her 4th Wimbledon title.

=== Juniors ===
==== Boys' singles ====
(United States) Scott Humphries defeated (Australia) Mark Philippoussis, 7–6^{(7–5)}, 3–6, 6–4

==== Girls' singles ====
(Switzerland) Martina Hingis defeated (South Korea) Jeon Mi-ra, 7–5, 6–4

==== Boys' doubles ====
(Australia) Ben Ellwood / (Australia) Mark Philippoussis defeated (Slovakia) Vladimír Pláteník / (Brazil) Ricardo Schlachter, 6–2, 6–4

==== Girls' doubles ====
(South Africa) Nannie de Villiers / (United Kingdom) Lizzie Jelfs defeated (United States) Corina Morariu / (San Marino) Ludmila Varmužová, 6–3, 6–4

== Singles seeds ==
=== Men's singles ===
1. (United States) Pete Sampras (champion)
2. (Germany) Michael Stich (first round, lost to Bryan Shelton)
3. (Sweden) Stefan Edberg (second round, lost to Kenneth Carlsen)
4. (Croatia) Goran Ivanišević (final, lost to Pete Sampras)
5. (United States) Jim Courier (second round, lost to Guy Forget)
6. (United States) Todd Martin (semifinals, lost to Pete Sampras)
7. (Germany) Boris Becker (semifinals, lost to Goran Ivanišević)
8. (Spain) Sergi Bruguera (fourth round, lost to Michael Chang)
9. (Ukraine) Andriy Medvedev (fourth round, lost to Boris Becker)
10. (United States) Michael Chang (quarterfinals, lost to Pete Sampras)
11. (Czech Republic) Petr Korda (second round, lost to Markus Zoecke)
12. (United States) Andre Agassi (fourth round, lost to Todd Martin)
13. (France) Cédric Pioline (first round, lost to Brett Steven)
14. (Switzerland) Marc Rosset (second round, lost to Wayne Ferreira)
15. (Russia) Yevgeny Kafelnikov (third round, lost to Daniel Vacek)
16. (France) Arnaud Boetsch (first round, lost to Andrei Olhovskiy)

=== Women's singles ===
1. (Germany) Steffi Graf (first round, lost to Lori McNeil)
2. (Spain) Arantxa Sánchez Vicario (fourth round, lost to Zina Garrison-Jackson)
3. (Spain) Conchita Martínez (champion)
4. (United States) Martina Navratilova (final, lost to Conchita Martínez)
5. (Czech Republic) Jana Novotná (quarterfinals, lost to Martina Navratilova)
6. (Japan) Kimiko Date (third round, lost to Larisa Neiland)
7. (France) Mary Pierce (withdrew before the tournament began)
8. (Belarus) Natasha Zvereva (first round, lost to Mana Endo)
9. (United States) Lindsay Davenport (quarterfinals, lost to Conchita Martínez)
10. (Argentina) Gabriela Sabatini (fourth round, lost to Lindsay Davenport)
11. (United States) Mary Joe Fernández (third round, lost to Naoko Sawamatsu)
12. (Germany) Anke Huber (second round, lost to Inés Gorrochategui)
13. (United States) Zina Garrison-Jackson (quarterfinals, lost to Gigi Fernández)
14. (South Africa) Amanda Coetzer (fourth round, lost to Larisa Neiland)
15. (Germany) Sabine Hack (first round, lost to Florencia Labat)
16. (Bulgaria) Magdalena Maleeva (second round, lost to Yayuk Basuki)
17. (Czech Republic) Helena Suková (fourth round, lost to Martina Navratilova)

Preceded by 1994 French Open	Grand Slams	Succeeded by 1994 U.S. Open
