= 1994 Wimbledon Championships – Men's doubles =

Tennis tournament

Men's doubles
- 1994 Wimbledon Championships

Final
- Champions: (Australia) Todd Woodbridge (Australia) Mark Woodforde
- Runners-up: (Canada) Grant Connell (United States) Patrick Galbraith
- Score: 7–6^{(7–3)}, 6–3, 6–1

Details
- Draw: 64 (3 Q / 5 WC )
- Seeds: 16

Events
| Singles | men | women | | boys | girls |
| Doubles | men | women | mixed | boys | girls |
| WC Singles | men | women | quad |
| WC Doubles | men | women | quad |
| Legends | men | women | seniors |
| ← 1993 · | Wimbledon Championships | · 1995 → |

Defending champions Todd Woodbridge and Mark Woodforde defeated Grant Connell and Patrick Galbraith in a rematch of the previous year's final, 7–6^{(7–3)}, 6–3, 6–1 to win the gentlemen's doubles title at the 1994 Wimbledon Championships. It was the Woodies' second Wimbledon title and third major title overall.

== Seeds ==
1. (Zimbabwe) Byron Black / (United States) Jonathan Stark (third round)
2. (Canada) Grant Connell / (United States) Patrick Galbraith (final)
3. (Netherlands) Jacco Eltingh / (Netherlands) Paul Haarhuis (quarterfinals)
4. (Sweden) Jan Apell / (Sweden) Jonas Björkman (third round)
5. (Australia) Todd Woodbridge / (Australia) Mark Woodforde (champions)
6. (Netherlands) Tom Nijssen / (Czech Republic) Cyril Suk (quarterfinals)
7. (South Africa) David Adams / (Russia) Andrei Olhovskiy (first round)
8. (Sweden) Henrik Holm / (Sweden) Anders Järryd (first round)
9. (United States) Patrick McEnroe / (United States) Richey Reneberg (first round)
10. (Netherlands) Hendrik Jan Davids / (South Africa) Piet Norval (first round)
11. (United States) Rick Leach / (South Africa) Danie Visser (second round)
12. (Czech Republic) Martin Damm / (Czech Republic) Karel Nováček (third round)
13. (United States) Ken Flach / (The Bahamas) Mark Knowles (second round)
14. (Germany) Marc-Kevin Goellner / (Russia) Yevgeny Kafelnikov (semifinals)
15. (United States) Brad Pearce / (United States) Dave Randall (first round)
16. (South Africa) Wayne Ferreira / (Germany) Michael Stich (semifinals)

Click on the seed number of a player to go to their draw section.

== Draw ==
=== Key ===
- Q = Qualifier
- WC = Wild card
- LL = Lucky loser
- Alt = Alternate
- ITF = ITF entry
- PR = Protected ranking
- SR = Special ranking
- SE = Special exempt
- JE = Junior exempt
- JR = Junior Accelerator Programme entrant
- CO = College Accelerator Programme entrant
- NG = Next Gen Accelerator Program entrant
- w/o = Walkover
- r = Retired
- d = Defaulted

=== Finals ===
Quarterfinals
16 | (South Africa) Wayne Ferreira (Germany) Michael Stich | 6 | 7 | 6
(South Africa) Marius Barnard (South Africa) Brent Haygarth | 3 | 5 | 2
3 | (Netherlands) Jacco Eltingh (Netherlands) Paul Haarhuis | 6 | 6^{3} | 2 | 7^{8} | 7
5 | (Australia) Todd Woodbridge (Australia) Mark Woodforde | 4 | 7^{7} | 6 | 6^{6} | 9
6 | (Netherlands) Tom Nijssen (Czech Republic) Cyril Suk | 4 | 7^{10} | 4 | 6 | 4
14 | (Germany) Marc-Kevin Goellner (Russia) Yevgeny Kafelnikov | 6 | 6^{8} | 6 | 3 | 6
(South Africa) Lan Bale (New Zealand) Brett Steven | 6^{3} | 6^{3} | 2
2 | (Canada) Grant Connell (United States) Patrick Galbraith | 7^{7} | 7^{7} | 6

Semifinals
16 | (South Africa) Wayne Ferreira (Germany) Michael Stich | 2 | 6^{5} | 2
5 | (Australia) Todd Woodbridge (Australia) Mark Woodforde | 6 | 7^{7} | 6
14 | (Germany) Marc-Kevin Goellner (Russia) Yevgeny Kafelnikov | 6 | 3 | 4 | 2
2 | (Canada) Grant Connell (United States) Patrick Galbraith | 4 | 6 | 6 | 6

Final
5 | (Australia) Todd Woodbridge (Australia) Mark Woodforde | 7^{7} | 6 | 6
2 | (Canada) Grant Connell (United States) Patrick Galbraith | 6^{3} | 3 | 1

=== Top half ===
==== Section 1 ====
First round
1 | (Zimbabwe) B Black (United States) J Stark | 7^{7} | 7^{7} | 6
(Spain) T Carbonell (Mexico) J Lozano | 6^{4} | 6^{4} | 4
(Germany) P Kühnen (South Africa) G Muller | 6 | 6^{11} | 7^{7} | 3 | 4
(France) O Delaître (France) S Simian | 4 | 7^{13} | 6^{2} | 6 | 6
(Germany) D Prinosil (Germany) U Riglewski | 6 | 7^{7} | 6
(Argentina) J Garat (United States) J Waite | 2 | 6^{5} | 3
WC | (United Kingdom) B Cowan (United Kingdom) A Richardson | 6 | 4 | 3 | 4
16 | (South Africa) W Ferreira (Germany) M Stich | 4 | 6 | 6 | 6
10 | (Netherlands) HJ Davids (South Africa) P Norval | 7^{9} | 7^{8} | 6^{3} | 6^{3} | 3
(South Africa) S Kruger (South Africa) M Ondruska | 6^{7} | 6^{6} | 7^{7} | 7^{7} | 6
(United Kingdom) J Bates (South Africa) C van Rensburg | 7^{14} | 6 | 6
(United States) B Garnett (United States) TJ Middleton | 6^{12} | 1 | 4
(United States) P Annacone (United States) D Flach | 7 | 6 | 3 | 4 | 6
(United States) L Jensen (United States) M Jensen | 5 | 3 | 6 | 6 | 4
(South Africa) M Barnard (South Africa) B Haygarth | 7^{7} | 6 | 6
8 | (Sweden) H Holm (Sweden) A Järryd | 6^{4} | 3 | 4

Second round
1 | (Zimbabwe) B Black (United States) J Stark | 6 | 6 | 6
(France) O Delaître (France) S Simian | 1 | 0 | 4
(Germany) D Prinosil (Germany) U Riglewski | 6^{5} | 6^{4} | 4
16 | (South Africa) W Ferreira (Germany) M Stich | 7^{7} | 7^{7} | 6
(South Africa) S Kruger (South Africa) M Ondruska | 2 | 6 | 7 | 7
(United Kingdom) J Bates (South Africa) C van Rensburg | 6 | 3 | 5 | 5
(United States) P Annacone (United States) D Flach | 6^{3} | 2 | 2
(South Africa) M Barnard (South Africa) B Haygarth | 7^{7} | 6 | 6

Third round
1 | (Zimbabwe) B Black (United States) J Stark | 5 | 4 | 4
16 | (South Africa) W Ferreira (Germany) M Stich | 7 | 6 | 6
(South Africa) S Kruger (South Africa) M Ondruska | 4 | 6 | 3 | 4
(South Africa) M Barnard (South Africa) B Haygarth | 6 | 3 | 6 | 6

Quarterfinals
16 | (South Africa) W Ferreira (Germany) M Stich | 6 | 7 | 6
(South Africa) M Barnard (South Africa) B Haygarth | 3 | 5 | 2

==== Section 2 ====
First round
3 | (Netherlands) J Eltingh (Netherlands) P Haarhuis | 7^{9} | 7^{7} | 6
(United States) T Kronemann (Netherlands) M Oosting | 6^{7} | 6^{3} | 4
(South Africa) J-L de Jager (South Africa) K Ullyett | 7^{7} | 6^{4} | 3 | 6 | 3
(Sweden) N Kulti (Sweden) M Larsson | 6^{3} | 7^{7} | 6 | 1 | 6
(Sweden) P Nyborg (Belgium) L Pimek | 3 | 4 | 2
(United States) S Davis (United States) T Martin | 6 | 6 | 6
(United States) M Bauer (Canada) D Nestor | 7^{7} | 4 | 7^{7} | 6^{5} | 4
13 | (United States) K Flach (The Bahamas) M Knowles | 6^{4} | 6 | 6^{3} | 7^{7} | 6
11 | (United States) R Leach (South Africa) D Visser | 7^{11} | 6 | 6
(Venezuela) N Pereira (Venezuela) M Ruah | 6^{9} | 4 | 2
Q | (Netherlands) S Noteboom (Netherlands) F Wibier | 7^{7} | 3 | 4 | 6^{4}
(United States) S Cannon (Australia) D Macpherson | 6^{5} | 6 | 6 | 7^{7}
(South Africa) E Ferreira (United States) M Keil | 6 | 7^{7} | 6
(United States) B MacPhie (United States) S Melville | 4 | 6^{3} | 3
(South Africa) R Deppe (Australia) L Warder | 3 | 6^{3} | 3
5 | (Australia) T Woodbridge (Australia) M Woodforde | 6 | 7^{7} | 6

Second round
3 | (Netherlands) J Eltingh (Netherlands) P Haarhuis | 6 | 6 | 7
(Sweden) N Kulti (Sweden) M Larsson | 3 | 4 | 5
(United States) S Davis (United States) T Martin | 7 | 1 | 6 | 6
13 | (United States) K Flach (The Bahamas) M Knowles | 5 | 6 | 3 | 4
11 | (United States) R Leach (South Africa) D Visser | 7^{7} | 1 | 4 | 7^{7} | 7
(United States) S Cannon (Australia) D Macpherson | 6^{5} | 6 | 6 | 6^{5} | 9
(South Africa) E Ferreira (United States) M Keil | 3 | 1 | 6^{3}
5 | (Australia) T Woodbridge (Australia) M Woodforde | 6 | 6 | 7^{7}

Third round
3 | (Netherlands) J Eltingh (Netherlands) P Haarhuis | 6 | 6 | 7^{7}
(United States) S Davis (United States) T Martin | 3 | 0 | 6^{4}
(United States) S Cannon (Australia) D Macpherson | 1 | 7^{7} | 3 | 2
5 | (Australia) T Woodbridge (Australia) M Woodforde | 6 | 6^{2} | 6 | 6

Quarterfinals
3 | (Netherlands) J Eltingh (Netherlands) P Haarhuis | 6 | 6^{3} | 2 | 7^{8} | 7
5 | (Australia) T Woodbridge (Australia) M Woodforde | 4 | 7^{7} | 6 | 6^{6} | 9

=== Bottom half ===
==== Section 3 ====
First round
6 | (Netherlands) T Nijssen (Czech Republic) C Suk | 6 | 6 | 7^{7}
Q | (Australia) J Eagle (Germany) L Rehmann | 4 | 2 | 6^{4}
WC | (United Kingdom) A Foster (United Kingdom) M Maclagan | 4 | 4 | 6^{6}
(United States) F Montana (United States) J Pugh | 6 | 6 | 7^{8}
(Australia) W Masur (United States) D Pate | 7^{7} | 7 | 3 | 6
WC | (United Kingdom) P Hand (United Kingdom) C Wilkinson | 6^{2} | 5 | 6 | 4
(Australia) A Kratzmann (Australia) M Kratzmann | 4 | 2 | 7^{7} | 6^{5}
12 | (Czech Republic) M Damm (Czech Republic) K Nováček | 6 | 6 | 6^{0} | 7^{7}
14 | (Germany) M-K Goellner (Russia) Y Kafelnikov | 6 | 7 | 7^{8}
(Spain) S Casal (Italy) D Nargiso | 3 | 5 | 6^{6}
(United States) S DeVries (United States) D Johnson | 6^{5} | 3 | 6^{4}
WC | (United Kingdom) T Henman (United Kingdom) M Petchey | 7^{7} | 6 | 7^{7}
WC | (United Kingdom) C Bailey (Canada) G Rusedski | 6 | 6 | 7^{8}
(Switzerland) J Hlasek (Czech Republic) D Vacek | 4 | 3 | 6^{6}
LL | (Australia) W Arthurs (Australia) B Larkham | 3 | 6 | 3 | 7^{9} | 2
4 | (Sweden) J Apell (Sweden) J Björkman | 6 | 3 | 6 | 6^{7} | 6

Second round
6 | (Netherlands) T Nijssen (Czech Republic) C Suk | 6 | 3 | 6 | 7^{9}
(United States) F Montana (United States) J Pugh | 3 | 6 | 2 | 6^{7}
(Australia) W Masur (United States) D Pate | 4 | 6^{3} | 6^{5}
12 | (Czech Republic) M Damm (Czech Republic) K Nováček | 6 | 7^{7} | 7^{7}
14 | (Germany) M-K Goellner (Russia) Y Kafelnikov | 2 | 6^{5} | 6 | 6 | 6
WC | (United Kingdom) T Henman (United Kingdom) M Petchey | 6 | 7^{7} | 4 | 4 | 4
WC | (United Kingdom) C Bailey (Canada) G Rusedski | 3 | 3 | 2
4 | (Sweden) J Apell (Sweden) J Björkman | 6 | 6 | 6

Third round
6 | (Netherlands) T Nijssen (Czech Republic) C Suk | 6^{5} | 3 | 7^{7} | 6 | 6
12 | (Czech Republic) M Damm (Czech Republic) K Nováček | 7^{7} | 6 | 6^{1} | 4 | 4
14 | (Germany) M-K Goellner (Russia) Y Kafelnikov | 6 | 6 | 7
4 | (Sweden) J Apell (Sweden) J Björkman | 1 | 4 | 5

Quarterfinals
6 | (Netherlands) T Nijssen (Czech Republic) C Suk | 4 | 7^{10} | 4 | 6 | 4
14 | (Germany) M-K Goellner (Russia) Y Kafelnikov | 6 | 6^{8} | 6 | 3 | 6

==== Section 4 ====
First round
7 | (South Africa) D Adams (Russia) A Olhovskiy | 7^{7} | 4 | 6 | 3 | 2
(South Africa) L Bale (New Zealand) B Steven | 6^{4} | 6 | 3 | 6 | 6
(Australia) D Cahill (Australia) J Fitzgerald | 6^{5} | 5 | 7 | 0
(United States) B Devening (United States) G Van Emburgh | 7^{7} | 7 | 5 | 6
(United States) A O'Brien (Australia) S Stolle | 7^{7} | 6 | 6
(United States) K Kinnear (Germany) A Mronz | 6^{3} | 3 | 3
(Canada) S Lareau (India) L Paes | 4 | 6 | 3 | 6 | 9
9 | (United States) P McEnroe (United States) R Reneberg | 6 | 4 | 6 | 3 | 7
15 | (United States) B Pearce (United States) D Randall | 1 | 4 | 3
LL | (Netherlands) T Kempers (Australia) M Tebbutt | 6 | 6 | 6
Q | (Australia) G Doyle (Australia) P Kilderry | 1 | 7^{10} | 3 | 5
(Czech Republic) D Rikl (United States) B Shelton | 6 | 6^{8} | 6 | 7
(Argentina) P Albano (Argentina) J Frana | 7^{7} | 7^{7} | 5 | 3 | 6
(Sweden) R Bergh (South Africa) B Talbot | 6^{4} | 6^{1} | 7 | 6 | 1
(Italy) C Brandi (Italy) F Mordegan | 4 | 7^{7} | 4 | 7 | 3
2 | (Canada) G Connell (United States) P Galbraith | 6 | 6^{4} | 6 | 5 | 6

Second round
(South Africa) L Bale (New Zealand) B Steven | 6 | 6 | 6
(United States) B Devening (United States) G Van Emburgh | 3 | 2 | 2
(United States) A O'Brien (Australia) S Stolle | 1 | 5 | 6^{4}
(Canada) S Lareau (India) L Paes | 6 | 7 | 7^{7}
LL | (Netherlands) T Kempers (Australia) M Tebbutt | 6^{7} | 4 | 5
(Czech Republic) D Rikl (United States) B Shelton | 7^{9} | 6 | 7
(Argentina) P Albano (Argentina) J Frana | 6^{5} | 2 | 6 | 3
2 | (Canada) G Connell (United States) P Galbraith | 7^{7} | 6 | 3 | 6

Third round
(South Africa) L Bale (New Zealand) B Steven | 7^{7} | 4 | 6 | 6
(Canada) S Lareau (India) L Paes | 6^{1} | 6 | 4 | 4
(Czech Republic) D Rikl (United States) B Shelton | 6^{5} | 4 | 3
2 | (Canada) G Connell (United States) P Galbraith | 7^{7} | 6 | 6

Quarterfinals
(South Africa) L Bale (New Zealand) B Steven | 6^{3} | 6^{3} | 2
2 | (Canada) G Connell (United States) P Galbraith | 7^{7} | 7^{7} | 6
