= 1994 Wimbledon Championships – Men's singles =

Men's singles
- 1994 Wimbledon Championships

Final
- Champion: (United States) Pete Sampras
- Runner-up: (Croatia) Goran Ivanišević
- Score: 7–6^{(7–2)}, 7–6^{(7–5)}, 6–0

Details
- Draw: 128 (16 Q / 8 WC )
- Seeds: 16

Events
Singles	men	women		boys	girls
Doubles	men	women	mixed	boys	girls
WC Singles	men	women	quad
WC Doubles	men	women	quad
Legends	men	women	seniors
← 1993 ·	Wimbledon Championships	· 1995 →

Defending champion Pete Sampras defeated Goran Ivanišević in the final, 7–6^{(7–2)}, 7–6^{(7–5)}, 6–0 to win the gentlemen's singles tennis title at the 1994 Wimbledon Championships. It was his second Wimbledon title and fifth major title overall.

== Seeds ==
1. (United States) Pete Sampras (champion)
2. (Germany) Michael Stich (first round)
3. (Sweden) Stefan Edberg (second round)
4. (Croatia) Goran Ivanišević (final)
5. (United States) Jim Courier (second round)
6. (United States) Todd Martin (semifinals)
7. (Germany) Boris Becker (semifinals)
8. (Spain) Sergi Bruguera (fourth round)
9. (Ukraine) Andriy Medvedev (fourth round)
10. (United States) Michael Chang (quarterfinals)
11. (Czech Republic) Petr Korda (second round)
12. (United States) Andre Agassi (fourth round)
13. (France) Cédric Pioline (first round)
14. (Switzerland) Marc Rosset (second round)
15. (Russia) Yevgeny Kafelnikov (third round)
16. (France) Arnaud Boetsch (first round)

Click on the seed number of a player to go to their draw section.

== Draw ==
=== Key ===
- Q = Qualifier
- WC = Wild card
- LL = Lucky loser
- Alt = Alternate
- ITF = ITF entry
- PR = Protected ranking
- SR = Special ranking
- SE = Special exempt
- JE = Junior exempt
- JR = Junior Accelerator Programme entrant
- CO = College Accelerator Programme entrant
- NG = Next Gen Accelerator Program entrant
- w/o = Walkover
- r = Retired
- d = Defaulted

=== Finals ===
Quarterfinals
1	(United States) Pete Sampras	6	6	6
10	(United States) Michael Chang	4	1	3
(South Africa) Wayne Ferreira	3	2	6	7	5
6	(United States) Todd Martin	6	6	3	5	7
(France) Guy Forget	6^{3}	6^{3}	4
4	(Croatia) Goran Ivanišević	7^{7}	7^{7}	6
7	(Germany) Boris Becker	7^{7}	6	6
(Sweden) Christian Bergström	6^{5}	4	3

Semifinals
1	(United States) Pete Sampras	6	6	3	6
6	(United States) Todd Martin	4	4	6	3
4	(Croatia) Goran Ivanišević	6	7^{8}	6
7	(Germany) Boris Becker	2	6^{6}	4

Final
1	(United States) Pete Sampras	7^{7}	7^{7}	6
4	(Croatia) Goran Ivanišević	6^{2}	6^{5}	0

=== Top half ===
==== Section 1 ====
First round
1	(United States) P Sampras	7^{7}	7	6
(United States) J Palmer	6^{4}	5	3
(United States) R Reneberg	7^{7}	6	7^{7}
Q	(United States) J Canter	6^{5}	3	6^{5}
(France) G Raoux	6	2	2	1
WC	(United Kingdom) A Foster	3	6	6	6
Q	(Spain) JF Altur	1	5	4
(United States) C Adams	6	7	6
(Japan) S Matsuoka	2	5	4
(Australia) M Woodforde	6	7	6
(France) G Solvès	4	2	6	6	2
(Czech Republic) D Vacek	6	6	4	2	6
(Germany) K Braasch	6	6	3	4	6
(United States) J Stark	2	4	6	6	3
Q	(Italy) L Tieleman	5	7^{7}	5	7^{7}	9
15	(Russia) Y Kafelnikov	7	6^{5}	7	6^{5}	11

Second round
1	(United States) P Sampras	6	6	6
(United States) R Reneberg	3	4	2
WC	(United Kingdom) A Foster	2	4	6^{3}
(United States) C Adams	6	6	7^{7}
(Australia) M Woodforde	3	6^{2}	4
(Czech Republic) D Vacek	6	7^{7}	6
(Germany) K Braasch	1	1	3
15	(Russia) Y Kafelnikov	6	6	6

Third round
1	(United States) P Sampras	6	6	6
(United States) C Adams	1	2	4
(Czech Republic) D Vacek	4	7	6	3	6
15	(Russia) Y Kafelnikov	6	5	4	6	4

Fourth round
1	(United States) P Sampras	6	6	7^{7}
(Czech Republic) D Vacek	4	1	6^{5}

==== Section 2 ====
First round
10	(United States) M Chang	7^{7}	6	6
(Spain) A Costa	6^{2}	4	2
Q	(Australia) M Tebbutt	6	6	6
(United States) R Weiss	3	0	3
WC	(United Kingdom) N Gould	3	6^{4}	7^{7}	6	5
(Peru) J Yzaga	6	7^{7}	6^{5}	4	7
Q	(Canada) G Connell	6	6	6
(Italy) S Pescosolido	4	4	4
Q	(Germany) C Saceanu	6	6	6
(France) S Simian	4	4	3
(France) J-P Fleurian	6	6	6^{5}	6^{4}	6
Q	(Australia) S Youl	3	4	7^{7}	7^{7}	1
(Australia) P Rafter	6	5	6	7^{7}
(Australia) J Morgan	4	7	4	6^{2}
WC	(United Kingdom) B Cowan	2	6	4	3
8	(Spain) S Bruguera	6	4	6	6

Second round
10	(United States) M Chang	3	6	7^{8}	6^{3}	6
Q	(Australia) M Tebbutt	6	3	6^{6}	7^{7}	4
(Peru) J Yzaga	3	6	1	6^{4}
Q	(Canada) G Connell	6	1	6	7^{7}
Q	(Germany) C Saceanu	5	3	4
(France) J-P Fleurian	7	6	6
(Australia) P Rafter	6^{4}	6	6	5	11
8	(Spain) S Bruguera	7^{7}	3	4	7	13

Third round
10	(United States) M Chang	7^{7}	6	6
Q	(Canada) G Connell	6^{4}	4	2
(France) J-P Fleurian	6^{4}	4	6	5
8	(Spain) S Bruguera	7^{7}	6	2	7

Fourth round
10	(United States) M Chang	6	7^{9}	6
8	(Spain) S Bruguera	4	6^{7}	0

==== Section 3 ====
First round
3	(Sweden) S Edberg	6	7^{7}	6
Q	(South Africa) E Ferreira	2	6^{3}	4
(Germany) M-K Goellner	4	3	6^{3}
(Denmark) K Carlsen	6	6	7^{7}
(Czech Republic) K Nováček	6^{8}	2	5
(South Africa) M Ondruska	7^{10}	6	7
(United Kingdom) M Petchey	2	1	6	6	1
(Sweden) J Björkman	6	6	2	2	6
(Spain) C Costa	2	3	7^{7}	6	6
(United States) A O'Brien	6	6	6^{5}	4	1
WC	(United Kingdom) C Wilkinson	6	3	6	3	7
(Italy) O Camporese	3	6	3	6	5
(Colombia) M Hadad	4	6	5	3
(South Africa) W Ferreira	6	3	7	6
Q	(United States) D Witt	2	4	6^{2}
14	(Switzerland) M Rosset	6	6	7^{7}

Second round
3	(Sweden) S Edberg	7^{8}	7^{8}	2	4	4
(Denmark) K Carlsen	6^{6}	6^{6}	6	6	6
(South Africa) M Ondruska	3	6	3	6	3
(Sweden) J Björkman	6	4	6	3	6
(Spain) C Costa	1	4	1
WC	(United Kingdom) C Wilkinson	6	6	6
(South Africa) W Ferreira	6^{7}	6	6	6
14	(Switzerland) M Rosset	7^{9}	3	4	4

Third round
(Denmark) K Carlsen	4	4	0^{r}
(Sweden) J Björkman	6	6	1
WC	(United Kingdom) C Wilkinson	2	2	3
(South Africa) W Ferreira	6	6	6

Fourth round
(Sweden) J Björkman	3	7^{7}	4	3
(South Africa) W Ferreira	6	6^{2}	6	6

==== Section 4 ====
First round
12	(United States) A Agassi	6	6^{3}	6	6
(Italy) A Gaudenzi	2	7^{7}	3	2
(Italy) R Furlan	6	4	3	4
(Venezuela) N Pereira	2	6	6	6
(Czech Republic) D Rikl	3	2	0
(United States) A Krickstein	6	6	6
(France) R Gilbert	2	5	5
(France) O Delaître	6	7	7
(United States) P McEnroe	7^{10}	3	4	2
(Czech Republic) M Damm	6^{8}	6	6	6
Q	(The Bahamas) M Knowles	6	7	7^{9}
(Russia) A Cherkasov	4	5	6^{7}
(Germany) P Kühnen	6	7	0	5	6
(Venezuela) M Ruah	3	5	6	7	4
(South Africa) G Stafford	4	2	7^{8}	7^{7}	1
6	(United States) T Martin	6	6	6^{6}	6^{5}	6

Second round
12	(United States) A Agassi	6^{4}	6	6	6^{5}	6
(Venezuela) N Pereira	7^{7}	3	4	7^{7}	4
(United States) A Krickstein	6^{2}	7	1	7^{8}	6
(France) O Delaître	7^{7}	5	6	6^{6}	2
(Czech Republic) M Damm	6	6	2	6
Q	(The Bahamas) M Knowles	3	4	6	1
(Germany) P Kühnen	2	2	4
6	(United States) T Martin	6	6	6

Third round
12	(United States) A Agassi	6	6	7^{7}
(United States) A Krickstein	4	3	6^{5}
(Czech Republic) M Damm	2	7^{7}	6	3	9
6	(United States) T Martin	6	6^{1}	4	6	11

Fourth round
12	(United States) A Agassi	3	5	7^{7}	6	1
6	(United States) T Martin	6	7	6^{0}	4	6

=== Bottom half ===
==== Section 5 ====
First round
5	(United States) J Courier	6	6^{5}	6	6
(Zimbabwe) B Black	1	7^{7}	3	4
(France) G Forget	6	6	6
LL	(United States) D Flach	1	2	2
(Australia) W Masur	6	6	3	6
(Austria) A Antonitsch	1	2	6	3
(Switzerland) J Hlasek	5	6	7	6
(United States) S Bryan	7	1	5	3
(Germany) J Renzenbrink	7^{7}	6	7^{8}
(United States) M Washington	6^{3}	4	6^{6}
(United Kingdom) J Bates	7	6	6
(Italy) G Pozzi	5	4	1
(Germany) M Zoecke	6	6	6
WC	(United Kingdom) M Maclagan	4	2	4
Q	(Australia) J Fitzgerald	2	1	4
11	(Czech Republic) P Korda	6	6	6

Second round
5	(United States) J Courier	6	3	6	3	4
(France) G Forget	3	6	3	6	6
(Australia) W Masur	1	4	6^{3}
(Switzerland) J Hlasek	6	6	7^{7}
(Germany) J Renzenbrink	2	6^{3}	4
(United Kingdom) J Bates	6	7^{7}	6
(Germany) M Zoecke	4	6^{5}	6	6	6
11	(Czech Republic) P Korda	6	7^{7}	3	2	4

Third round
(France) G Forget	6	6	7^{7}
(Switzerland) J Hlasek	4	4	6^{3}
(United Kingdom) J Bates	6	6	3	6
(Germany) M Zoecke	4	4	6	3

Fourth round
(France) G Forget	2	6	6	6
(United Kingdom) J Bates	6	1	3	1

==== Section 6 ====
First round
13	(France) C Pioline	2	6	3	1
(New Zealand) B Steven	6	4	6	6
(United States) J Tarango	4	2	2
(Russia) A Volkov	6	6	6
Q	(Canada) S Lareau	3	2	0
(Netherlands) J Eltingh	6	6	6
(Germany) D Prinosil	4	6	6	6
WC	(United Kingdom) T Henman	6	3	2	2
(Spain) T Carbonell	5	6	6	1	4
(Israel) A Mansdorf	7	2	4	6	6
(United States) J Grabb	2^{r}
Q	(United States) K Thorne	3
WC	(Austria) T Muster	7	6^{3}	7^{9}	4	6
Q	(Germany) A Mronz	5	7^{7}	6^{7}	6	8
(Brazil) F Meligeni	1	3	4
4	(Croatia) G Ivanišević	6	6	6

Second round
(New Zealand) B Steven	6	4	6	5	3
(Russia) A Volkov	4	6	3	7	6
(Netherlands) J Eltingh	6	2	3	4
(Germany) D Prinosil	3	6	6	6
(Israel) A Mansdorf	7^{7}	6	6^{1}	6
Q	(United States) K Thorne	6^{1}	3	7^{7}	1
Q	(Germany) A Mronz	2	6^{4}	1
4	(Croatia) G Ivanišević	6	7^{7}	6

Third round
(Russia) A Volkov	7^{7}	6	6
(Germany) D Prinosil	6^{4}	3	3
(Israel) A Mansdorf	3	5	4
4	(Croatia) G Ivanišević	6	7	6

Fourth round
(Russia) A Volkov	6^{3}	6^{6}	6	2
4	(Croatia) G Ivanišević	7^{7}	7^{8}	4	6

==== Section 7 ====
First round
7	(Germany) B Becker	6	6	6
(United States) D Wheaton	2	4	3
Q	(Germany) A Thoms	3	6	2	6	11
(Germany) B Karbacher	6	3	6	4	9
(Argentina) J Frana	3	7^{7}	7	6
WC	(United Kingdom) C Bailey	6	6^{3}	5	3
(United States) B Gilbert	6	7^{7}	4	6
(Slovakia) K Kučera	3	6^{4}	6	2
(France) H Leconte	6	6	5	6^{6}	2^{r}
(Spain) À Corretja	2	4	7	7^{8}	3
(Australia) R Fromberg	6	6^{9}	7	2	6
(Germany) H Dreekmann	4	7^{11}	5	6	3
(Czech Republic) C Doseděl	6	6	6
(Morocco) Y El Aynaoui	1	4	4
(Haiti) R Agénor	4	7	3	2
9	(Ukraine) A Medvedev	6	5	6	6

Second round
7	(Germany) B Becker	7^{8}	6	6
Q	(Germany) A Thoms	6^{6}	2	4
(Argentina) J Frana	6	4	6	6
(United States) B Gilbert	3	6	1	2
(Spain) À Corretja	2	6^{6}	5
(Australia) R Fromberg	6	7^{8}	7
(Czech Republic) C Doseděl	6	5	1	4
9	(Ukraine) A Medvedev	3	7	6	6

Third round
7	(Germany) B Becker	7^{7}	6	1	6
(Argentina) J Frana	6^{4}	4	6	3
(Australia) R Fromberg	6^{4}	3	7	4
9	(Ukraine) A Medvedev	7^{7}	6	5	6

Fourth round
7	(Germany) B Becker	6^{5}	7	7^{7}	6^{3}	7
9	(Ukraine) A Medvedev	7^{7}	5	6^{3}	7^{7}	5

==== Section 8 ====
First round
16	(France) A Boetsch	2	3	5
(Russia) A Olhovskiy	6	6	7
(Spain) J Burillo	6	6	4	5	6
(Sweden) L Jönsson	2	2	6	7	4
(Sweden) C Bergström	6	7	6
(Italy) D Nargiso	1	5	2
(Sweden) N Kulti	3	4	2
(Canada) G Rusedski	6	6	6
(Australia) D Cahill	6	6	5	7^{7}
(Netherlands) R Krajicek	3	2	7	6^{5}
(Australia) J Stoltenberg	7^{7}	6	6
(Netherlands) P Haarhuis	6^{2}	1	4
(Morocco) K Alami	7^{7}	7^{7}	7
(Sweden) M Larsson	6^{4}	6^{3}	5
Q	(United States) B Shelton	6	6	6
2	(Germany) M Stich	3	3	4

Second round
(Russia) A Olhovskiy	0	1	3
(Spain) J Burillo	6	6	6
(Sweden) C Bergström	6	6	5	7^{7}
(Canada) G Rusedski	4	4	7	6^{5}
(Australia) D Cahill	2	0^{r}
(Australia) J Stoltenberg	6	1
(Morocco) K Alami	3	5	6	7^{9}	2
Q	(United States) B Shelton	6	7	1	6^{7}	6

Third round
(Spain) J Burillo	3	3	4
(Sweden) C Bergström	6	6	6
(Australia) J Stoltenberg	6^{7}	7	7	5	4
Q	(United States) B Shelton	7^{9}	5	5	7	6

Fourth round
(Sweden) C Bergström	3	6	3	6	10
Q	(United States) B Shelton	6	3	6	3	8

Preceded by 1994 French Open – Men's singles	Grand Slam men's singles	Succeeded by 1994 US Open – Men's singles
