= 1994 Wimbledon Championships – Women's doubles =

Tennis tournament

Women's doubles
- 1994 Wimbledon Championships

Final
- Champions: (United States) Gigi Fernández (Belarus) Natasha Zvereva
- Runners-up: (Czechoslovakia) Jana Novotná (Spain) Arantxa Sánchez Vicario
- Score: 6–4, 6–1

Details
- Draw: 64 (2 Q / 3 WC )
- Seeds: 16

Events
Singles	men	women		boys	girls
Doubles	men	women	mixed	boys	girls
WC Singles	men	women	quad
WC Doubles	men	women	quad
Legends	men	women	seniors
← 1993 ·	Wimbledon Championships	· 1995 →

Gigi Fernández and Natasha Zvereva successfully defended their title, defeating Jana Novotná and Arantxa Sánchez Vicario in the final, 6–4, 6–1 to win the ladies' doubles tennis title at the 1994 Wimbledon Championships. The win marked their third consecutive Wimbledon crown together, as well as their 9th grand slam title in the last 10 consecutive grand slams.

== Seeds ==
1. (United States) Gigi Fernández / (Belarus) Natasha Zvereva (champions)
2. (Czech Republic) Jana Novotná / (Spain) Arantxa Sánchez Vicario (final)
3. (United States) Patty Fendick / (United States) Meredith McGrath (third round)
4. (Netherlands) Manon Bollegraf / (United States) Martina Navratilova (semifinals)
5. (United States) Pam Shriver / (Australia) Elizabeth Smylie (quarterfinals)
6. (United States) Katrina Adams / (Czech Republic) Helena Suková (second round)
7. (Ukraine) Natalia Medvedeva / (Latvia) Larisa Neiland (quarterfinals)
8. (South Africa) Amanda Coetzer / (Argentina) Inés Gorrochategui (withdrew)
9. (United States) Lindsay Davenport / (United States) Lisa Raymond (third round)
10. (United States) Mary Joe Fernández / (United States) Zina Garrison (first round)
11. (United States) Lori McNeil / (Australia) Rennae Stubbs (third round)
12. (France) Julie Halard-Decugis / (France) Nathalie Tauziat (third round)
13. (Indonesia) Yayuk Basuki / (Japan) Nana Miyagi (third round)
14. (Italy) Sandra Cecchini / (Argentina) Patricia Tarabini (second round)
15. (Canada) Jill Hetherington / (United States) Shaun Stafford (second round)
16. (Italy) Laura Golarsa / (Netherlands) Caroline Vis (third round)

Click on the seed number of a player to go to their draw section.

== Draw ==
=== Key ===
- Q = Qualifier
- WC = Wild card
- LL = Lucky loser
- Alt = Alternate
- ITF = ITF entry
- PR = Protected ranking
- SR = Special ranking
- SE = Special exempt
- JE = Junior exempt
- JR = Junior Accelerator Programme entrant
- CO = College Accelerator Programme entrant
- NG = Next Gen Accelerator Program entrant
- w/o = Walkover
- r = Retired
- d = Defaulted

=== Finals ===
Quarterfinals
1	(United States) Gigi Fernández (Belarus) Natasha Zvereva	6	4	6
(United States) Linda Harvey-Wild (United States) Chanda Rubin	1	6	0
4	(Netherlands) Manon Bollegraf (United States) Martina Navratilova	6	6
(Netherlands) Ingelise Driehuis (Croatia) Maja Murić	4	2
7	(Ukraine) Natalia Medvedeva (Latvia) Larisa Neiland	6	3	1
(United States) Nicole Arendt (Australia) Kristine Radford	2	6	6
5	(United States) Pam Shriver (Australia) Elizabeth Smylie	3	4
2	(Czech Republic) Jana Novotná (Spain) Arantxa Sánchez Vicario	6	6

Semifinals
1	(United States) Gigi Fernández (Belarus) Natasha Zvereva	6	6
4	(Netherlands) Manon Bollegraf (United States) Martina Navratilova	4	4
(United States) Nicole Arendt (Australia) Kristine Radford	6	5	3
2	(Czech Republic) Jana Novotná (Spain) Arantxa Sánchez Vicario	4	7	6

Final
1	(United States) Gigi Fernández (Belarus) Natasha Zvereva	6	6
2	(Czech Republic) Jana Novotná (Spain) Arantxa Sánchez Vicario	4	1

=== Top half ===
==== Section 1 ====
First round
1	(United States) G Fernández (Belarus) N Zvereva	2	6	6
(South Africa) E Reinach (Czech Republic) A Strnadová	6	2	2
(Germany) A Huber (Germany) W Probst	6	7^{7}
Q	(France) K Quentrec (France) S Testud	2	6^{3}
WC	(United Kingdom) J Durie (Australia) L Field	2	6^{5}
(Australia) M Jaggard-Lai (United States) M Werdel	6	7^{7}
(Belgium) S Appelmans (Belgium) L Courtois	0	4
13	(Indonesia) Y Basuki (Japan) N Miyagi	6	6
9	(United States) L Davenport (United States) L Raymond	6	6
(Bulgaria) M Maleeva (Spain) C Martínez	4	4
(Belgium) D Monami (Austria) P Ritter	6	4	6
(Italy) S Farina (United States) G Helgeson	3	6	8
LL	(Australia) N Pratt (United States) J Steven	5	4
(United States) L Harvey-Wild (United States) C Rubin	7	6
(Czech Republic) E Martincová (Germany) C Schneider	3	0
6	(United States) K Adams (Czech Republic) H Suková	6	6

Second round
1	(United States) G Fernández (Belarus) N Zvereva	7	6
(Germany) A Huber (Germany) W Probst	5	1
(Australia) M Jaggard-Lai (United States) M Werdel	3	3
13	(Indonesia) Y Basuki (Japan) N Miyagi	6	6
9	(United States) L Davenport (United States) L Raymond	6	6
(Italy) S Farina (United States) G Helgeson	1	3
(United States) L Harvey-Wild (United States) C Rubin	6	'7^{'}7
6	(United States) K Adams (Czech Republic) H Suková	2	6^{4}

Third round
1	(United States) G Fernández (Belarus) N Zvereva	6^{0}	6	6
13	(Indonesia) Y Basuki (Japan) N Miyagi	7^{7}	4	4
9	(United States) L Davenport (United States) L Raymond	4	5
(United States) L Harvey-Wild (United States) C Rubin	6	7

Quarterfinals
1	(United States) G Fernández (Belarus) N Zvereva	6	4	6
(United States) L Harvey-Wild (United States) C Rubin	1	6	0

==== Section 2 ====
First round
4	(Netherlands) M Bollegraf (United States) M Navratilova	6	6
(Argentina) B Fulco-Villella (Japan) R Hiraki	1	4
Q	(Sweden) M Lindström (Sweden) M Strandlund	6	3	4
(Slovakia) K Habšudová (Slovakia) R Zrubáková	4	6	6
(United Kingdom) S-A Siddall (United Kingdom) A Wainwright	6	4	7
(United States) C Benjamin (Romania) R Dragomir	2	6	5
(United States) A Grossman (United States) E Nagelsen	1	2
12	(France) J Halard (France) N Tauziat	6	6
16	(Italy) L Golarsa (Netherlands) C Vis	6	7^{7}
WC	(United Kingdom) C Taylor (United Kingdom) J Ward	2	6^{1}
(Czech Republic) K Hrdličková (Czech Republic) E Melicharová	2	2
(Australia) J Byrne (New Zealand) J Richardson	6	6
(Japan) M Donoshiro (Japan) A Sugiyama	1	6	1
(Ukraine) E Brioukhovets (Czech Republic) P Langrová	6	2	6
(Netherlands) I Driehuis (Croatia) M Murić	6	5	7
LL	(Netherlands) G Coorengel (United Kingdom) A Smith	2	7	5

Second round
4	(Netherlands) M Bollegraf (United States) M Navratilova	6	6
(Slovakia) K Habšudová (Slovakia) R Zrubáková	2	1
(United Kingdom) S-A Siddall (United Kingdom) A Wainwright	5	2
12	(France) J Halard (France) N Tauziat	7	6
16	(Italy) L Golarsa (Netherlands) C Vis	6	6
(Australia) J Byrne (New Zealand) J Richardson	4	2
(Ukraine) E Brioukhovets (Czech Republic) P Langrová	4	6	4
(Netherlands) I Driehuis (Croatia) M Murić	6	2	6

Third round
4	(Netherlands) M Bollegraf (United States) M Navratilova	6^{2}	6	6
12	(France) J Halard (France) N Tauziat	7^{7}	4	4
16	(Italy) L Golarsa (Netherlands) C Vis	3	4
(Netherlands) I Driehuis (Croatia) M Murić	6	6

Quarterfinals
4	(Netherlands) M Bollegraf (United States) M Navratilova	6	6
(Netherlands) I Driehuis (Croatia) M Murić	4	2

=== Bottom half ===
==== Section 3 ====
First round
7	(Ukraine) N Medvedeva (Latvia) L Neiland	2	6	6
(Croatia) I Majoli (United States) S Reece	6	1	2
(Russia) E Maniokova (Georgia (country)) L Meskhi	6	6
(Netherlands) C Bakkum (France) A Fusai	1	4
(Netherlands) K Boogert (Netherlands) N Muns-Jagerman	6	7
(Japan) A Kijimuta (Japan) N Kijimuta	1	5
(Germany) B Rittner (Germany) C Singer	1	6	6
10	(United States) MJ Fernandez (United States) Z Garrison-Jackson	6	4	3
14	(Italy) A-M Cecchini (Argentina) P Tarabini	6	6
(Germany) M Babel (Germany) K Kschwendt	2	4
(Canada) P Hy (Canada) R Simpson-Alter	3	6	3
(United States) N Arendt (Australia) K Radford	6	4	6
(United States) A Frazier (United States) K Po	1	0
(Australia) C Barclay (Australia) K-A Guse	6	6
(Australia) R McQuillan (Netherlands) M Oremans	2	3
3	(United States) P Fendick (United States) M McGrath	6	6

Second round
7	(Ukraine) N Medvedeva (Latvia) L Neiland	7	4	6
(Russia) E Maniokova (Georgia (country)) L Meskhi	5	6	2
(Netherlands) K Boogert (Netherlands) N Muns-Jagerman	6	5	9
(Germany) B Rittner (Germany) C Singer	3	7	7
14	(Italy) A-M Cecchini (Argentina) P Tarabini	3	6^{4}
(United States) N Arendt (Australia) K Radford	6	7^{7}
(Australia) C Barclay (Australia) K-A Guse	1	4
3	(United States) P Fendick (United States) M McGrath	6	6

Third round
7	(Ukraine) N Medvedeva (Latvia) L Neiland	6	6
(Netherlands) K Boogert (Netherlands) N Muns-Jagerman	3	2
(United States) N Arendt (Australia) K Radford	7	6
3	(United States) P Fendick (United States) M McGrath	5	4

Quarterfinals
7	(Ukraine) N Medvedeva (Latvia) L Neiland	6	3	1
(United States) N Arendt (Australia) K Radford	2	6	6

==== Section 4 ====
First round
5	(United States) P Shriver (Australia) E Smylie	6	6
(France) N van Lottum (Romania) I Spîrlea	2	3
(Australia) J-A Faull (United States) S McCarthy	6^{7}	1
(Sweden) Å Carlsson (Finland) N Dahlman	7^{9}	6
(France) A Dechaume-Balleret (Argentina) F Labat	6^{3}	6	5
(Bulgaria) K Maleeva (United States) R White	7^{7}	4	7
WC	(United Kingdom) J Pullin (United Kingdom) L Woodroffe	3	7^{7}	5
15	(Canada) J Hetherington (United States) S Stafford	6	6^{3}	7
11	(United States) L McNeil (Australia) R Stubbs	7	6
(Japan) Y Kamio (Slovenia) T Križan	5	3
(Ukraine) O Lugina (Bulgaria) E Wagner	7	6
(Argentina) M Paz (Argentina) G Sabatini	5	2
(United States) D Graham (Netherlands) B Schultz	6	6
(United States) S Collins (South Africa) M de Swardt	3	4
(United Kingdom) V Lake (United Kingdom) C Wood	1	1
2	(Czech Republic) J Novotná (Spain) A Sánchez Vicario	6	6

Second round
5	(United States) P Shriver (Australia) E Smylie	6	6
(Sweden) Å Carlsson (Finland) N Dahlman	4	2
(Bulgaria) K Maleeva (United States) R White	6	6
15	(Canada) J Hetherington (United States) S Stafford	3	4
11	(United States) L McNeil (Australia) R Stubbs	6^{4}	6	6
(Ukraine) O Lugina (Bulgaria) E Wagner	7^{7}	0	1
(United States) D Graham (Netherlands) B Schultz	4	6	1
2	(Czech Republic) J Novotná (Spain) A Sánchez Vicario	6	3	6

Third round
5	(United States) P Shriver (Australia) E Smylie	6	6
(Bulgaria) K Maleeva (United States) R White	3	4
11	(United States) L McNeil (Australia) R Stubbs	7^{9}	4	3
2	(Czech Republic) J Novotná (Spain) A Sánchez Vicario	6^{7}	6	6

Quarterfinals
5	(United States) P Shriver (Australia) E Smylie	3	4
2	(Czech Republic) J Novotná (Spain) A Sánchez Vicario	6	6
