= 1994 Wimbledon Championships – Boys' doubles =

Boys' doubles
- 1994 Wimbledon Championships

Final
- Champions: (Australia) Ben Ellwood (Australia) Mark Philippoussis
- Runners-up: (Slovakia) Vladimír Pláteník (Brazil) Ricardo Schlachter
- Score: 6–2, 6–4

Events
Singles	men	women		boys	girls
Doubles	men	women	mixed	boys	girls
WC Singles	men	women	quad
WC Doubles	men	women	quad
Legends	men	women	seniors
← 1993 ·	Wimbledon Championships	· 1995 →

Ben Ellwood and Mark Philippoussis defeated Vladimír Pláteník and Ricardo Schlachter in the final, 6–2, 6–4 to win the boys' doubles tennis title at the 1994 Wimbledon Championships.

== Seeds ==
1. (Australia) Ben Ellwood / (Australia) Mark Philippoussis (champions)
2. (Brazil) Gustavo Kuerten / (Ecuador) Nicolás Lapentti (semifinals)
3. (Mexico) Alejandro Hernández / (Mexico) Gerardo Venegas Escalente (second round)
4. (United Kingdom) Jamie Delgado / (Slovakia) Roman Kukal (second round)
5. (Mexico) Ricardo Rosas / (Peru) Carlos José Tori (second round)
6. (United States) Paul Goldstein / (United States) Scott Humphries (semifinals)
7. (Slovakia) Vladimír Pláteník / (Brazil) Ricardo Schlachter (final)
8. (Japan) Yaoki Ishii / (Japan) Takao Suzuki (first round, withdrew)

== Draw ==
=== Key ===
- Q = Qualifier
- WC = Wild card
- LL = Lucky loser
- Alt = Alternate
- SE = Special exempt
- PR = Protected ranking
- ITF = ITF entry
- JE = Junior exempt
- w/o = Walkover
- r = Retired
- d = Defaulted
- SR = Special ranking

=== Finals ===
Semifinals
1	(Australia) Ben Ellwood (Australia) Mark Philippoussis	4	6	6
6	(United States) Paul Goldstein (United States) Scott Humphries	6	4	3
7	(Slovakia) Vladimír Pláteník (Brazil) Ricardo Schlachter	7^{9}	5	6
2	(Brazil) Gustavo Kuerten (Ecuador) Nicolás Lapentti	6^{7}	7	4

Final
1	(Australia) Ben Ellwood (Australia) Mark Philippoussis	6	6
7	(Slovakia) Vladimír Pláteník (Brazil) Ricardo Schlachter	2	4

=== Top half ===
First round
1	(Australia) Ben Ellwood (Australia) Mark Philippoussis	7	6
(Indonesia) Andrian Raturandang (Thailand) Paradorn Srichaphan	6	3
(Austria) Markus Hipfl (Austria) Wolfgang Schranz	2	2
(South Africa) Jeff Coetzee (New Zealand) Mark Nielsen	6	6
(Israel) Eyal Erlich (Israel) Jonathan Erlich	7	6
(United Kingdom) Michael Boulding (United Kingdom) Gareth Jones	6	4
(Germany) Patrick Gottesleben (Germany) Rainer Schüttler	7	0	8
5	(Mexico) Ricardo Rosas (Peru) Carlos José Tori	5	6	10
4	(United Kingdom) Jamie Delgado (Slovakia) Roman Kukal	6	3	6
(Czech Republic) Radovan Chrz (Czech Republic) Jiří Vaněk	3	6	2
(New Zealand) Teo Susnjak (United States) Ryan Wolters	4	3
(New Zealand) Scott Clark (Canada) Chris Santoso	6	6
(Argentina) Federico Browne (Federal Republic of Yugoslavia) Nenad Zimonjić	6	6	6
(India) Amirben Barua (South Korea) Lee Jong-min	3	7	2
(Mexico) Fernando Sierra (Morocco) Mehdi Tahiri	4	0
6	(United States) Paul Goldstein (United States) Scott Humphries	6	6

Second round
1	(Australia) B Ellwood (Australia) M Philippoussis	6	6
(South Africa) J Coetzee (New Zealand) M Nielsen	4	2
(Israel) E Erlich (Israel) J Erlich	6	7
5	(Mexico) R Rosas (Peru) CJ Tori	3	6
4	(United Kingdom) J Delgado (Slovakia) R Kukal	3	6	6
(New Zealand) S Clark (Canada) C Santoso	6	1	8
(Argentina) F Browne (Federal Republic of Yugoslavia) N Zimonjić	6	2
6	(United States) P Goldstein (United States) S Humphries	7	6

Quarterfinals
1	(Australia) B Ellwood (Australia) M Philippoussis	6	7
(Israel) E Erlich (Israel) J Erlich	1	6
(New Zealand) S Clark (Canada) C Santoso	0	1
6	(United States) P Goldstein (United States) S Humphries	6	6

Semifinals
1	(Australia) B Ellwood (Australia) M Philippoussis	4	6	6
6	(United States) P Goldstein (United States) S Humphries	6	4	3

=== Bottom half ===
First round
7	(Slovakia) Vladimír Pláteník (Brazil) Ricardo Schlachter
(Germany) Alex Bose (Bosnia and Herzegovina) Merid Zahirović	w/o
(Czech Republic) Jiří Hobler (Czech Republic) Tomáš Zíb	4	6
(France) Jean-François Bachelot (France) Jean-Noël Grinda	6	7
(United Kingdom) Paul Martin (United Kingdom) Jamie Williams	4	4
(Australia) Andrew Ilie (Australia) James Sekulov	6	6
(Slovakia) Tomáš Čatár (Slovakia) Dominik Hrbatý	4	2
3	(Mexico) Alejandro Hernández (Mexico) Gerardo Venegas Escalente	6	6
8	(Japan) Yaoki Ishii (Japan) Takao Suzuki	w/o
(United Kingdom) Colin Bennett (United Kingdom) Michael Ingham
(Austria) Stefan Koubek (Hungary) Szilard Szirtesi	7	6	7
(Sweden) Kalle Flygt (Sweden) Nicklas Timfjord	6	7	9
(United Kingdom) Nicholas Jones (United Kingdom) Luke Milligan	7	7
(Argentina) Gustavo Cavallaro (Chile) Juan Flores	5	6
(Brazil) Rodrigo Monte (Brazil) Antonio Wuttke	3	4
2	(Brazil) Gustavo Kuerten (Ecuador) Nicolás Lapentti	6	6

Second round
7	(Slovakia) V Pláteník (Brazil) R Schlachter	6	7
(France) J-F Bachelot (France) J-N Grinda	3	6
(Australia) A Ilie (Australia) J Sekulov	6	6
3	(Mexico) A Hernández (Mexico) G Venegas Escalente	3	2
(United Kingdom) C Bennett (United Kingdom) M Ingham	1	4
(Sweden) K Flygt (Sweden) N Timfjord	6	6
(United Kingdom) N Jones (United Kingdom) L Milligan	3	5
2	(Brazil) G Kuerten (Ecuador) N Lapentti	6	7

Quarterfinals
7	(Slovakia) V Pláteník (Brazil) R Schlachter	6	7
(Australia) A Ilie (Australia) J Sekulov	3	6
(Sweden) K Flygt (Sweden) N Timfjord	2	3
2	(Brazil) G Kuerten (Ecuador) N Lapentti	6	6

Semifinals
7	(Slovakia) V Pláteník (Brazil) R Schlachter	7^{9}	5	6
2	(Brazil) Gustavo Kuerten (Ecuador) Nicolás Lapentti	6^{7}	7	4
