= 1994 Wimbledon Championships – Mixed doubles =

Mixed doubles
- 1994 Wimbledon Championships

Final
- Champions: (Australia) Todd Woodbridge (Czech Republic) Helena Suková
- Runners-up: (United States) T. J. Middleton (United States) Lori McNeil
- Score: 3–6, 7–5, 6–3

Details
- Draw: 64 (5WC)
- Seeds: 16

Events
Singles	men	women		boys	girls
Doubles	men	women	mixed	boys	girls
WC Singles	men	women	quad
WC Doubles	men	women	quad
Legends	men	women	seniors
- Wimbledon Championships

Mark Woodforde and Martina Navratilova were the defending champions but Navratilova did not compete. Woodforde competed with Meredith McGrath but lost in the quarterfinals to Byron Black and Pam Shriver.

Todd Woodbridge and Helena Suková defeated T. J. Middleton and Lori McNeil in the final, 3–6, 7–5, 6–3 to win the mixed doubles tennis title at the 1994 Wimbledon Championships. Woodbridge completed his career grand slam in Mixed Doubles.

== Seeds ==
1. (United States) Jonathan Stark / (United States) Patty Fendick (second round)
2. (Zimbabwe) Byron Black / (United States) Pam Shriver (semifinals)
3. (Czech Republic) Cyril Suk / (United States) Gigi Fernández (second round, withdrew)
4. (Australia) Todd Woodbridge / (Czech Republic) Helena Suková (champions)
5. (Australia) Mark Woodforde / (United States) Meredith McGrath (quarterfinals)
6. (Canada) Grant Connell / (United States) Lindsay Davenport (semifinals)
7. (Russia) Andrei Olhovskiy / (Latvia) Larisa Neiland (quarterfinals)
8. (Netherlands) Tom Nijssen / (Netherlands) Manon Bollegraf (first round)
9. (United States) Rick Leach / (United States) Lisa Raymond (third round)
10. (United States) Patrick Galbraith / (United States) Debbie Graham (first round)
11. (Australia) John Fitzgerald / (Australia) Elizabeth Smylie (quarterfinals)
12. (South Africa) Piet Norval / (Netherlands) Caroline Vis (first round)
13. (United States) Ken Flach / (New Zealand) Julie Richardson (third round, withdrew)
14. (South Africa) David Adams / (Netherlands) Kristie Boogert (first round)
15. (Australia) Darren Cahill / (Australia) Rennae Stubbs (withdrew)
16. (United States) Brad Pearce / (Australia) Kerry-Anne Guse (first round)

Click on the seed number of a player to go to their draw section.

== Draw ==
Key

- Q = Qualifier
- WC = Wild card
- LL = Lucky loser
- Alt = Alternate
- ITF = ITF entry
- PR = Protected ranking
- SR = Special ranking
- SE = Special exempt
- JE = Junior exempt
- JR = Junior Accelerator Programme entrant
- CO = College Accelerator Programme entrant
- NG = Next Gen Accelerator Program entrant
- w/o = Walkover
- r = Retired
- d = Defaulted

=== Finals ===
Quarterfinals
11	(Australia) John Fitzgerald (Australia) Elizabeth Smylie	3	6^{4}
6	(Canada) Grant Connell (United States) Lindsay Davenport	6	7^{7}
4	(Australia) Todd Woodbridge (Czech Republic) Helena Suková	6	6
7	(Russia) Andrei Olhovskiy (Latvia) Larisa Neiland	2	4
(United States) T. J. Middleton (United States) Lori McNeil	6	6
(Venezuela) Maurice Ruah (Argentina) Florencia Labat	3	2
5	(Australia) Mark Woodforde (United States) Meredith McGrath	6^{2}	6	5
2	(Zimbabwe) Byron Black (United States) Pam Shriver	7^{7}	3	7

Semifinals
6	(Canada) Grant Connell (United States) Lindsay Davenport	3	4
4	(Australia) Todd Woodbridge (Czech Republic) Helena Suková	6	6
(United States) T. J. Middleton (United States) Lori McNeil	6	7^{10}
2	(Zimbabwe) Byron Black (United States) Pam Shriver	3	6^{8}

Final
4	(Australia) Todd Woodbridge (Czech Republic) Helena Suková	3	7	6
(United States) T. J. Middleton (United States) Lori McNeil	6	5	3

=== Top half ===
==== Section 1 ====
First round
1	(United States) J Stark (United States) P Fendick	6	2	6
(The Bahamas) M Knowles (United States) A Grossman	3	6	4
(United States) T Kronemann (United States) Z Garrison-Jackson	2	6	5
(Australia) D Macpherson (Australia) R McQuillan	6	4	7
(Germany) U Riglewski (Germany) K Kschwendt	7	6
(United States) M Jensen (France) N van Lottum	5	4
(Netherlands) S Noteboom (Netherlands) M Oremans	2	2
11	(Australia) J Fitzgerald (Australia) E Smylie	6	6
Alt	(Australia) L Warder (Australia) T Morton-Rodgers	5	7	6
(Belgium) L Pimek (Belgium) S Appelmans	7	5	4
(Argentina) P Albano (Argentina) P Tarabini	6	3	4
(Argentina) J Frana (Italy) S Farina	4	6	6
(United States) M Bauer (United States) S Collins	3	6^{3}
WC	(United Kingdom) C Bailey (Spain) A Sánchez Vicario	6	7^{7}
(South Africa) G Muller (United States) E Nagelsen	3	1
6	(Canada) G Connell (United States) L Davenport	6	6

Second round
1	(United States) J Stark (United States) P Fendick	5	6^{3}
(Australia) D Macpherson (Australia) R McQuillan	7	7^{7}
(Germany) U Riglewski (Germany) K Kschwendt	2	6^{3}
11	(Australia) J Fitzgerald (Australia) E Smylie	6	7^{7}
Alt	(Australia) L Warder (Australia) T Morton-Rodgers	1	6	2
(Argentina) J Frana (Italy) S Farina	6	2	6
WC	(United Kingdom) C Bailey (Spain) A Sánchez Vicario	6	3	4
6	(Canada) G Connell (United States) L Davenport	3	6	6

Third round
(Australia) D Macpherson (Australia) R McQuillan	7^{8}	6^{4}	7
11	(Australia) J Fitzgerald (Australia) E Smylie	6^{6}	7^{7}	9
(Argentina) J Frana (Italy) S Farina	3	1
6	(Canada) G Connell (United States) L Davenport	6	6

Quarterfinals
11	(Australia) J Fitzgerald (Australia) E Smylie	3	6^{4}
6	(Canada) G Connell (United States) L Davenport	6	7^{7}

==== Section 2 ====
First round
4	(Australia) T Woodbridge (Czech Republic) H Suková	7	6
(United States) S Davis (United States) R White	5	3
(South Africa) B Haygarth (Germany) C Singer	6^{4}	6	6
(United States) B MacPhie (United States) K Po	7^{7}	2	4
(South Africa) C van Rensburg (Canada) J Hetherington	6	4	6
(Australia) S Stolle (Czech Republic) A Strnadová	3	6	3
(South Africa) D Visser (South Africa) E Reinach	7^{7}	4	6
10	(United States) P Galbraith (United States) D Graham	6^{5}	6	3
13	(United States) K Flach (New Zealand) J Richardson	7^{9}	6
(New Zealand) B Steven (Australia) J-A Faull	6^{7}	2
(Australia) M Kratzmann (Australia) J Byrne	4	3
WC	(Ukraine) A Medvedev (Germany) A Huber	6	6
(United States) B Garnett (United States) C Rubin	7^{7}	6
(Australia) P Kilderry (United States) N Arendt	6^{3}	4
(Netherlands) F Wibier (Netherlands) N Muns-Jagerman	7	4	7
7	(Russia) A Olhovskiy (Latvia) L Neiland	5	6	9

Second round
4	(Australia) T Woodbridge (Czech Republic) H Suková
(South Africa) B Haygarth (Germany) C Singer	w/o
(South Africa) C van Rensburg (Canada) J Hetherington	6	6
(South Africa) D Visser (South Africa) E Reinach	2	3
13	(United States) K Flach (New Zealand) J Richardson
WC	(Ukraine) A Medvedev (Germany) A Huber	w/o
(United States) B Garnett (United States) C Rubin	4	5
7	(Russia) A Olhovskiy (Latvia) L Neiland	6	7

Third round
4	(Australia) T Woodbridge (Czech Republic) H Suková	6	3	6
(South Africa) C van Rensburg (Canada) J Hetherington	1	6	3
13	(United States) K Flach (New Zealand) J Richardson	w/o
7	(Russia) A Olhovskiy (Latvia) L Neiland

Quarterfinals
4	(Australia) T Woodbridge (Czech Republic) H Suková	6	6
7	(Russia) A Olhovskiy (Latvia) L Neiland	2	4

=== Bottom half ===
==== Section 3 ====
First round
8	(Netherlands) T Nijssen (Netherlands) M Bollegraf	7	4	4
(United States) TJ Middleton (United States) L McNeil	5	6	6
(United Kingdom) J Bates (United Kingdom) J Durie	6	6
(United States) S Cannon (United States) S Stafford	3	3
(India) L Paes (Indonesia) Y Basuki	7	2	7
(United States) K Jones (United States) K Adams	5	6	5
(South Africa) B Talbot (Argentina) M Paz	6^{1}	6	6
14	(South Africa) D Adams (Netherlands) K Boogert	7^{7}	4	2
12	(South Africa) P Norval (Netherlands) C Vis	4	6	3
WC	(United Kingdom) P Hand (United Kingdom) V Lake	6	1	6
WC	(United Kingdom) M Petchey (United Kingdom) C Wood	6^{3}	5
(Venezuela) M Ruah (Argentina) F Labat	7^{7}	7
WC	(United Kingdom) A Foster (United Kingdom) C Taylor	3	3
(Argentina) J Garat (Belgium) D Monami	6	6
(United States) J Pugh (Australia) K Radford	3	2
3	(Czech Republic) C Suk (United States) G Fernández	6	6

Second round
(United States) TJ Middleton (United States) L McNeil	2	6	6
(United Kingdom) J Bates (United Kingdom) J Durie	6	4	4
(India) L Paes (Indonesia) Y Basuki	6	4	6
(South Africa) B Talbot (Argentina) M Paz	1	6	4
WC	(United Kingdom) P Hand (United Kingdom) V Lake	3	6^{0}
(Venezuela) M Ruah (Argentina) F Labat	6	7^{7}
(Argentina) J Garat (Belgium) D Monami
3	(Czech Republic) C Suk (United States) G Fernández	w/o

Third round
(United States) TJ Middleton (United States) L McNeil	6	3	6
(India) L Paes (Indonesia) Y Basuki	4	6	3
(Venezuela) M Ruah (Argentina) F Labat	6	6
(Argentina) J Garat (Belgium) D Monami	3	4

Quarterfinals
(United States) TJ Middleton (United States) L McNeil	6	6
(Venezuela) M Ruah (Argentina) F Labat	3	2

==== Section 4 ====
First round
5	(Australia) M Woodforde (United States) M McGrath	6	6
(United States) S Melville (Slovakia) J Husárová	3	4
(United States) J Waite (Italy) A-M Cecchini	6	7^{7}
(South Africa) M Barnard (Australia) M Jaggard-Lai	3	6^{3}
(United States) D Randall (Germany) C Schneider	3	6	6
(United States) P Annacone (United States) MJ Fernández	6	3	2
(South Africa) L Bale (South Africa) A Coetzer	6	3	6
16	(United States) B Pearce (Australia) K-A Guse	4	6	3
9	(United States) R Leach (United States) L Raymond	6	6^{5}	11
(United States) G Van Emburgh (United States) L Harvey-Wild	2	7^{7}	9
(United States) L Jensen (Netherlands) B Schultz	7	5	6
(United States) D Johnson (Romania) I Spîrlea	5	7	4
(United States) K Kinnear (Japan) N Miyagi	6^{4}	6	6
(South Africa) J-L de Jager (South Africa) M de Swardt	7^{7}	4	4
(United States) D Pate (Australia) C Barclay	2	2
2	(Zimbabwe) B Black (United States) P Shriver	6	6

Second round
5	(Australia) M Woodforde (United States) M McGrath	6	7^{7}
(United States) J Waite (Italy) A-M Cecchini	2	6^{5}
(United States) D Randall (Germany) C Schneider	3	6	3
(South Africa) L Bale (South Africa) A Coetzer	6	3	6
9	(United States) R Leach (United States) L Raymond	6	6
(United States) L Jensen (Netherlands) B Schultz	0	3
(United States) K Kinnear (Japan) N Miyagi	7^{7}	4	4
2	(Zimbabwe) B Black (United States) P Shriver	6^{1}	6	6

Third round
5	(Australia) M Woodforde (United States) M McGrath	7^{7}	6
(South Africa) L Bale (South Africa) A Coetzer	6^{2}	1
9	(United States) R Leach (United States) L Raymond	6^{5}	3
2	(Zimbabwe) B Black (United States) P Shriver	7^{7}	6

Quarterfinals
5	(Australia) M Woodforde (United States) M McGrath	6^{2}	6	5
2	(Zimbabwe) B Black (United States) P Shriver	7^{7}	3	7
