= 1994 Wimbledon Championships – Women's singles =

Women's singles
- 1994 Wimbledon Championships

Final
- Champion: (Spain) Conchita Martínez
- Runner-up: (United States) Martina Navratilova
- Score: 6–4, 3–6, 6–3

Details
- Draw: 128 (8 Q / 8 WC )
- Seeds: 16

Events
Singles	men	women		boys	girls
Doubles	men	women	mixed	boys	girls
WC Singles	men	women	quad
WC Doubles	men	women	quad
Legends	men	women	seniors
← 1993 ·	Wimbledon Championships	· 1995 →

Conchita Martínez defeated Martina Navratilova in the final, 6–4, 3–6, 6–3 to win the ladies' singles tennis title at the 1994 Wimbledon Championships. It was her first and only major title. It was Navratilova's 32nd and last major singles final.

Steffi Graf was the three-time defending champion, but lost in the first round to Lori McNeil, ending her streak of 31 consecutive major quarterfinals, dating to the 1985 US Open. One of the biggest upsets in tennis history, this marked the first time in the Open Era that a defending major champion lost in the first round of their title defence. It was Graf's only loss at Wimbledon between 1991 and 1996.

== Seeds ==
1. (Germany) Steffi Graf (first round)
2. (Spain) Arantxa Sánchez Vicario (fourth round)
3. (Spain) Conchita Martínez (champion)
4. (United States) Martina Navratilova (final)
5. (Czech Republic) Jana Novotná (quarterfinals)
6. (Japan) Kimiko Date (third round)
7. (France) Mary Pierce (withdrew)
8. (Belarus) Natasha Zvereva (first round)
9. (United States) Lindsay Davenport (quarterfinals)
10. (Argentina) Gabriela Sabatini (fourth round)
11. (United States) Mary Joe Fernández (third round)
12. (Germany) Anke Huber (second round)
13. (United States) Zina Garrison-Jackson (quarterfinals)
14. (South Africa) Amanda Coetzer (fourth round)
15. (Germany) Sabine Hack (first round)
16. (Bulgaria) Magdalena Maleeva (second round)
17. (Czech Republic) Helena Suková (fourth round)

Click on the seed number of a player to go to their draw section.

Mary Pierce withdrew for personal reasons. She was replaced in the draw by the highest-ranked non-seeded player Helena Suková, who became the #17 seed.

== Draw ==
=== Key ===
- Q = Qualifier
- WC = Wild card
- LL = Lucky loser
- Alt = Alternate
- ITF = ITF entry
- PR = Protected ranking
- SR = Special ranking
- SE = Special exempt
- JE = Junior exempt
- JR = Junior Accelerator Programme entrant
- CO = College Accelerator Programme entrant
- NG = Next Gen Accelerator Program entrant
- w/o = Walkover
- r = Retired
- d = Defaulted

=== Finals ===
Quarterfinals
(United States) Lori McNeil	6	6
(Latvia) Larisa Neiland	3	4
3	(Spain) Conchita Martínez	6	6^{4}	6
9	(United States) Lindsay Davenport	2	7^{7}	3
5	(Czech Republic) Jana Novotná	7	0	1
4	(United States) Martina Navratilova	5	6	6
(United States) Gigi Fernández	6	6
13	(United States) Zina Garrison-Jackson	4	4

Semifinals
(United States) Lori McNeil	6	2	8
3	(Spain) Conchita Martínez	3	6	10
4	(United States) Martina Navratilova	6	7^{8}
(United States) Gigi Fernández	4	6^{6}

Final
3	(Spain) Conchita Martínez	6	3	6
4	(United States) Martina Navratilova	4	6	3

=== Top half ===
==== Section 1 ====
First round
1	(Germany) S Graf	5	6^{5}
(United States) L McNeil	7	7^{7}
(Germany) P Begerow	0	2
(Japan) Y Kamio	6	6
Q	(Australia) E Smylie	4	6	2
(Netherlands) K Boogert	6	4	6
Q	(France) A Dechaume-Balleret	6	7
(Japan) K Nagatsuka	3	5
(Australia) R McQuillan	6	2	6
(United States) P Fendick	3	6	3
(United States) A Frazier	7^{7}	2	6
(United States) P Shriver	6^{4}	6	8
(Canada) H Kelesi	6^{6}	2
(Czech Republic) P Langrová	7^{8}	6
(Argentina) F Labat	6	3	6
15	(Germany) S Hack	3	6	4

Second round
(United States) L McNeil	6	6^{5}	6
(Japan) Y Kamio	3	7^{7}	3
(Netherlands) K Boogert	6	7
Q	(France) A Dechaume-Balleret	3	5
(Australia) R McQuillan	7	2	6
(United States) P Shriver	5	6	8
(Czech Republic) P Langrová	2	2
(Argentina) F Labat	6	6

Third round
(United States) L McNeil	6	6
(Netherlands) K Boogert	2	4
(United States) P Shriver	4	6	2
(Argentina) F Labat	6	4	6

Fourth round
(United States) L McNeil	7^{7}	7^{7}
(Argentina) F Labat	6^{4}	6^{4}

==== Section 2 ====
First round
14	(South Africa) A Coetzer	6	6
(Kazakhstan) E Likhovtseva	4	0
(United States) C Rubin	2	7^{7}	6
Q	(Australia) L Field	6	6^{4}	8
LL	(Netherlands) C Wegink	6	6
WC	(United Kingdom) A Wainwright	2	3
(Germany) V Martinek	3	2
(United States) G Helgeson	6	6
(Latvia) L Neiland	6	6
Q	(United States) K Adams	4	3
(Russia) E Maniokova	6	4	5
(Israel) A Smashnova	4	6	7
(Germany) C Singer	4	7	5
WC	(United Kingdom) S-A Siddall	6	5	7
LL	(Japan) A Sugiyama	3	6^{0}
6	(Japan) K Date	6	7^{7}

Second round
14	(South Africa) A Coetzer	6	6
Q	(Australia) L Field	4	0
LL	(Netherlands) C Wegink	2	2
(United States) G Helgeson	6	6
(Latvia) L Neiland	6	6
(Israel) A Smashnova	3	4
WC	(United Kingdom) S-A Siddall	2	0
6	(Japan) K Date	6	6

Third round
14	(South Africa) A Coetzer	6	6
(United States) G Helgeson	0	3
(Latvia) L Neiland	6	6
6	(Japan) K Date	3	2

Fourth round
14	(South Africa) A Coetzer	6	3	4
(Latvia) L Neiland	1	6	6

==== Section 3 ====
First round
3	(Spain) C Martínez	6	6
(Canada) R Simpson-Alter	1	3
Q	(Japan) N Miyagi	4	7	8
(United States) L Raymond	6	5	6
(Sweden) Å Carlsson	2	1
(France) N Tauziat	6	6
(South Africa) J Kruger	6^{6}	3
(South Africa) E Reinach	7^{8}	6
(Mexico) A Gavaldón	0	0
(Australia) K Radford	6	6
(Romania) I Spîrlea	6	6
WC	(United Kingdom) M Javer	1	2
(United States) D Graham	3	1
(Argentina) I Gorrochategui	6	6
WC	(United Kingdom) J Durie	5	2
12	(Germany) A Huber	7	6

Second round
3	(Spain) C Martínez	6	7^{7}
Q	(Japan) N Miyagi	1	6^{3}
(France) N Tauziat	6	6^{4}	6
(South Africa) E Reinach	3	7^{7}	2
(Australia) K Radford	7	3	6
(Romania) I Spîrlea	5	6	4
(Argentina) I Gorrochategui	6	6
12	(Germany) A Huber	3	4

Third round
3	(Spain) C Martínez	6	6
(France) N Tauziat	1	3
(Australia) K Radford
(Argentina) I Gorrochategui	w/o

Fourth round
3	(Spain) C Martínez	3	6	6
(Australia) K Radford	6	3	4

==== Section 4 ====
First round
10	(Argentina) G Sabatini	2	6	6
(Austria) J Wiesner	6	4	1
(Australia) J Byrne	6	6
(Slovakia) J Husárová	3	0
(France) K Quentrec	6	5	4
(United States) C Kuhlman	3	7	6
WC	(United Kingdom) J Pullin	2	4
(United States) M McGrath	6	6
(Romania) R Dragomir	6	6
(United Kingdom) C Wood	3	1
(Germany) B Rittner	6	6
(Belgium) S Appelmans	0	4
LL	(Czech Republic) A Strnadová	3	5
LL	(South Africa) T Price	6	7
(France) J Halard	1	4
9	(United States) L Davenport	6	6

Second round
10	(Argentina) G Sabatini	6	6
(Australia) J Byrne	2	3
(United States) C Kuhlman	1	3
(United States) M McGrath	6	6
(Romania) R Dragomir	2	1
(Germany) B Rittner	6	6
LL	(South Africa) T Price	4	2
9	(United States) L Davenport	6	6

Third round
10	(Argentina) G Sabatini	6	6
(United States) M McGrath	4	1
(Germany) B Rittner	4	6	1
9	(United States) L Davenport	6	3	6

Fourth round
10	(Argentina) G Sabatini	1	3
9	(United States) L Davenport	6	6

=== Bottom half ===
==== Section 5 ====
First round
5	(Czech Republic) J Novotná	6	4	6
(Netherlands) M Oremans	4	6	4
(France) S Testud	2	1
(Germany) W Probst	6	6
(France) A Fusai	5	5
(Ukraine) E Brioukhovets	7	7
WC	(United Kingdom) J Ward	0	2
(Belgium) D Monami	6	6
(Netherlands) C Vis	6^{4}	3
(Japan) N Sawamatsu	7^{7}	6
(Czech Republic) R Bobková	6	6
(Czech Republic) L Richterová	3	1
(Georgia (country)) L Meskhi	6	3	4
(Netherlands) B Schultz	2	6	6
(Slovakia) K Habšudová	4	2
11	(United States) MJ Fernández	6	6

Second round
5	(Czech Republic) J Novotná	6	6
(Germany) W Probst	2	1
(Ukraine) E Brioukhovets	1	6	2
(Belgium) D Monami	6	4	6
(Japan) N Sawamatsu	6	6
(Czech Republic) R Bobková	1	3
(Netherlands) B Schultz	4	4
11	(United States) MJ Fernández	6	6

Third round
5	(Czech Republic) J Novotná	6	4	6
(Belgium) D Monami	0	6	0
(Japan) N Sawamatsu	6	7
11	(United States) MJ Fernández	0	5

Fourth round
5	(Czech Republic) J Novotná	6	6
(Japan) N Sawamatsu	3	3

==== Section 6 ====
First round
17	(Czech Republic) H Suková	6^{7}	6	6
(United States) T Whitlinger-Jones	7^{9}	0	3
(Austria) P Ritter	3	6	6
(Argentina) P Tarabini	6	3	8
(Germany) S Frankl	6	7^{7}
(Austria) B Schett	1	6^{1}
(Croatia) I Majoli	6	3	4
(United States) S Cacic	4	6	6
(United States) L Harvey-Wild	6	4	6
(Netherlands) M Bollegraf	1	6	3
(Germany) M Babel	4	6	6
(Argentina) P Suárez	6	2	1
(Canada) P Hy	2	4
(Italy) A-M Cecchini	6	6
WC	(United Kingdom) C Taylor	2	3
4	(United States) M Navratilova	6	6

Second round
17	(Czech Republic) H Suková	6	6
(Argentina) P Tarabini	4	2
(Germany) S Frankl	2	6	6
(United States) S Cacic	6	1	3
(United States) L Harvey-Wild	6	2	6
(Germany) M Babel	2	6	2
(Italy) A-M Cecchini	2	0
4	(United States) M Navratilova	6	6

Third round
17	(Czech Republic) H Suková	6	6
(Germany) S Frankl	3	2
(United States) L Harvey-Wild	3	2
4	(United States) M Navratilova	6	6

Fourth round
17	(Czech Republic) H Suková	1	2
4	(United States) M Navratilova	6	6

==== Section 7 ====
First round
8	(Belarus) N Zvereva	6	4	1
(Japan) M Endo	4	6	6
WC	(United Kingdom) K Cross	0	1
(United States) J Watanabe	6	6
(United States) K Po	6	6
(Germany) M Kochta	2	4
(Italy) M Grossi	2	1
(United States) G Fernández	6	6
(Italy) S Farina	2	4
(United States) A Grossman	6	6
(Netherlands) N Muns-Jagerman	3	2
(United States) N Arendt	6	6
(Ukraine) N Medvedeva	3	2
(Indonesia) Y Basuki	6	6
(United States) S Stafford	7^{8}	2	4
16	(Bulgaria) M Maleeva	6^{6}	6	6

Second round
(Japan) M Endo	6	6
(United States) J Watanabe	3	4
(United States) K Po	2	6	7
(United States) G Fernández	6	1	9
(United States) A Grossman	6	3	6
(United States) N Arendt	4	6	4
(Indonesia) Y Basuki	5	7^{7}	6
16	(Bulgaria) M Maleeva	7	6^{3}	4

Third round
(Japan) M Endo	6	3	3
(United States) G Fernández	4	6	6
(United States) A Grossman	0	2
(Indonesia) Y Basuki	6	6

Fourth round
(United States) G Fernández	6	6
(Indonesia) Y Basuki	4	1

==== Section 8 ====
First round
13	(United States) Z Garrison-Jackson	6	7^{7}
(Slovakia) K Studeníková	3	6^{4}
(Austria) S Dopfer	1	6^{2}
Q	(Argentina) M Paz	6	7^{7}
(China) F Li	6	6
(Switzerland) E Zardo	4	3
(Italy) L Golarsa	6	7^{7}
Q	(France) I Demongeot	3	6^{3}
(United States) M Werdel	6	5	6
(Argentina) B Fulco-Villella	2	7	2
Q	(Belgium) N Feber	6	6
(Belgium) L Courtois	0	1
(Argentina) MJ Gaidano	7^{8}	7
(Austria) B Reinstadler	6^{6}	5
(Bulgaria) K Maleeva	1	2
2	(Spain) A Sánchez Vicario	6	6

Second round
13	(United States) Z Garrison-Jackson	7	6
Q	(Argentina) M Paz	5	0
(China) F Li	3	0
(Italy) L Golarsa	6	6
(United States) M Werdel	4	4
Q	(Belgium) N Feber	6	6
(Argentina) MJ Gaidano	2	1
2	(Spain) A Sánchez Vicario	6	6

Third round
13	(United States) Z Garrison-Jackson	6	4
(Italy) L Golarsa	2	1^{r}
Q	(Belgium) N Feber	2	1
2	(Spain) A Sánchez Vicario	6	6

Fourth round
13	(United States) Z Garrison-Jackson	7	4	6
2	(Spain) A Sánchez Vicario	5	6	3

Preceded by 1994 French Open – Women's singles	Grand Slam women's singles	Succeeded by 1994 US Open – Women's singles
