= 1995 Australian Open – Women's singles =

Women's singles
- 1995 Australian Open

Final
- Champion: (France) Mary Pierce
- Runner-up: (Spain) Arantxa Sánchez Vicario
- Score: 6–3, 6–2

Details
- Draw: 128
- Seeds: 16

Events
Singles	men	women		boys	girls
Doubles	men	women	mixed	boys	girls
WC Singles	men	women	quad
WC Doubles	men	women	quad
Legends	men	women	mixed
- Australian Open

Mary Pierce defeated Arantxa Sánchez Vicario in the final, 6–3, 6–2 to win the women's singles tennis title at the 1995 Australian Open. It was her first major singles title. Pierce did not lose a set during the tournament.

Steffi Graf was the reigning champion, but did not participate due to an injury. As Monica Seles was still recovering from being stabbed in the back on 30 April 1993, by a crazed fan of Graf, this was the first time since 1987 that neither Graf, nor Seles, played in the Australian Open. The duo won 7 consecutive Australian Open titles from 1988 to 1994, with Graf winning the first three and Seles winning the next three.

This tournament marked the first main-draw major appearance of future world No. 1, five-time major singles champion, three-time (1997-1999) Australian Open singles champion, and 6-time (1997-2002) Australian Open singles finalist Martina Hingis; she lost in the second round to Kyōko Nagatsuka.

== Seeds ==
The seeded players are listed below. Mary Pierce is the champion; others show the round in which they were eliminated.

1. (Spain) Arantxa Sánchez Vicario (final)
2. (Spain) Conchita Martínez (semifinals)
3. (Czech Republic) Jana Novotná (fourth round)
4. (France) Mary Pierce (champion)
5. (Argentina) Gabriela Sabatini (first round)
6. (United States) Lindsay Davenport (quarterfinals)
7. (Japan) Kimiko Date (third round)
8. (Belarus) Natasha Zvereva (quarterfinals)

9. (Bulgaria) Magdalena Maleeva (first round)
10. (Germany) Anke Huber (fourth round)
11. (United States) Mary Joe Fernández (fourth round)
12. (Netherlands) Brenda Schultz (fourth round)
13. (Germany) Sabine Hack (first round)
14. (United States) Amy Frazier (third round)
15. (United States) Lori McNeil (third round)
16. (France) Julie Halard (first round)

Click on the seed number of a player to go to their draw section.

== Draw ==
Key

- Q = Qualifier
- WC = Wild card
- LL = Lucky loser
- Alt = Alternate
- ITF = ITF entry
- PR = Protected ranking
- SR = Special ranking
- SE = Special exempt
- JE = Junior exempt
- JR = Junior Accelerator Programme entrant
- CO = College Accelerator Programme entrant
- NG = Next Gen Accelerator Program entrant
- w/o = Walkover
- r = Retired
- d = Defaulted

=== Finals ===
Quarterfinals
1	(Spain) Arantxa Sánchez Vicario	6	6
(Japan) Naoko Sawamatsu	1	3
(Mexico) Angélica Gavaldón	1	2
(United States) Marianne Werdel-Witmeyer	6	6
8	(Belarus) Natasha Zvereva	1	4
4	(France) Mary Pierce	6	6
6	(United States) Lindsay Davenport	3	6	3
2	(Spain) Conchita Martínez	6	4	6

Semifinals
1	(Spain) Arantxa Sánchez Vicario	6	6
(United States) Marianne Werdel-Witmeyer	4	1
4	(France) Mary Pierce	6	6
2	(Spain) Conchita Martínez	3	1

Finals
1	(Spain) Arantxa Sánchez Vicario	3	2
4	(France) Mary Pierce	6	6

=== Top half ===
==== Section 1 ====
First round
1	(Spain) A Sánchez Vicario	6	6
(China) F Li	2	0
(United States) T Whitlinger-Jones	6	6
(Germany) P Begerow	2	4
(Germany) C Singer	6	6
(Germany) M Kochta	1	3
(United States) Z Garrison-Jackson	3	6	6
(Australia) K-A Guse	6	2	3
(Germany) M Babel	6	6
(Japan) M Endo	4	2
(United States) C Rubin	6	6
(Australia) K Radford	1	2
(Slovakia) K Habšudová	6	6
(Italy) N Baudone	4	2
(Ukraine) N Medvedeva	4	7	6
9	(Bulgaria) M Maleeva	6	5	3

Second round
1	(Spain) A Sánchez Vicario	6	6
(United States) T Whitlinger-Jones	2	1
(Germany) C Singer	2	1
(United States) Z Garrison-Jackson	6	6
(Germany) M Babel	4	6	9
(United States) C Rubin	6	4	7
(Slovakia) K Habšudová	6	6
(Ukraine) N Medvedeva	3	1

Third round
1	(Spain) A Sánchez Vicario	6	6
(United States) Z Garrison-Jackson	1	3
(Germany) M Babel	6	1	3
(Slovakia) K Habšudová	2	6	6

Fourth round
1	(Spain) A Sánchez Vicario	7	6
(Slovakia) K Habšudová	5	0

==== Section 2 ====
First round
11	(United States) M J Fernández	7	6
(Belgium) E Callens	5	4
(United States) L Harvey-Wild	6	6
(United States) P Shriver	3	0
(Romania) R Dragomir	7	4	6
(Austria) S Dopfer	5	6	4
(South Africa) A Coetzer	6	6
(Spain) Á Montolio	2	2
(Japan) N Sawamatsu	6	6
(Japan) A Sugiyama	3	3
(Belgium) L Courtois	7^{7}	6
Q	(Czech Republic) K Kroupova	6^{2}	2
(United States) P Fendick	6	6
(United States) A Grossman	1	2
(Russia) E Likhovtseva	2	2
7	(Japan) K Date	6	6

Second round
11	(United States) M J Fernández	7^{7}	7
(United States) L Harvey-Wild	6^{5}	5
(Romania) R Dragomir	4	6	4
(South Africa) A Coetzer	6	4	6
(Japan) N Sawamatsu	6	6
(Belgium) L Courtois	0	4
(United States) P Fendick	4	3
7	(Japan) K Date	6	6

Third round
11	(United States) M J Fernández	6	5	6
(South Africa) A Coetzer	3	7	2
(Japan) N Sawamatsu	3	6	6
7	(Japan) K Date	6	3	3

Fourth round
11	(United States) M J Fernández	4	6^{5}
(Japan) N Sawamatsu	6	7^{7}

==== Section 3 ====
First round
3	(Czech Republic) J Novotná	6	3	6
(Canada) P Hy-Boulais	2	6	0
(Czech Republic) H Suková	6	6
(United States) M McGrath	3	1
(United States) L Raymond	6	6
Q	(Japan) Y Yoshida	4	2
WC	(Australia) K Godridge	6^{4}	6	6
(Japan) N Miyagi	7^{7}	2	1
(Mexico) A Gavaldón	6	6
LL	(Netherlands) Y Basting	2	0
(South Africa) J Kruger	4	6	6
(South Africa) M de Swardt	6	3	4
(Germany) S Meier	7^{15}	2	6
WC	(Australia) J Taylor	6^{13}	6	2
(France) A Dechaume-Balleret	3	3
15	(United States) L McNeil	6	6

Second round
3	(Czech Republic) J Novotná	3	6	6
(Czech Republic) H Suková	6	3	2
(United States) L Raymond	6	4	6
WC	(Australia) K Godridge	3	6	3
(Mexico) A Gavaldón	6	6
(South Africa) J Kruger	3	1
(Germany) S Meier	6^{4}	1
15	(United States) L McNeil	7^{7}	6

Third round
3	(Czech Republic) J Novotná	6	3	9
(United States) L Raymond	1	6	7
(Mexico) A Gavaldón	2	6	8
15	(United States) L McNeil	6	3	6

Fourth round
3	(Czech Republic) J Novotná	5	0
(Mexico) A Gavaldón	7	6

==== Section 4 ====
First round
13	(Germany) S Hack	5	6	0
Q	(United States) A Keller	7	1	6
(Austria) B Paulus	7^{7}	6
(Switzerland) E Zardo	6^{3}	0
(Belgium) S Appelmans	6	6
(Italy) L Golarsa	2	4
(Czech Republic) R Bobková	7	6
(Austria) P Schwarz	5	3
(Russia) E Makarova	6	6
(Belarus) T Ignatieva	0	1
(Slovakia) R Zrubáková	6	6
(United States) N Arendt	4	1
(South Korea) S-h Park	0	7^{7}	6
(Georgia (country)) L Meskhi	6	6^{4}	2
(United States) M Werdel-Witmeyer	6	6
5	(Argentina) G Sabatini	4	4

Second round
Q	(United States) A Keller	3	3
(Austria) B Paulus	6	6
(Belgium) S Appelmans	6	6
(Czech Republic) R Bobková	2	0
(Russia) E Makarova	6	6
(Slovakia) R Zrubáková	0	2
(South Korea) S-h Park	5	3
(United States) M Werdel-Witmeyer	7	6

Third round
(Austria) B Paulus	6	6
(Belgium) S Appelmans	1	3
(Russia) E Makarova	0	2
(United States) M Werdel-Witmeyer	6	6

Fourth round
(Austria) B Paulus	2	3
(United States) M Werdel-Witmeyer	6	6

=== Bottom half ===
==== Section 5 ====
First round
8	(Belarus) N Zvereva	6	6
(France) A Fusai	4	0
(Italy) S Farina	7	6
(United States) G Fernández	5	2
(Austria) J Wiesner	6	6^{6}	6
Q	(Japan) R Hiraki	1	7^{8}	0
(United States) S Stafford	6	6
WC	(United States) A Miller	3	4
(Japan) K Nagatsuka	6	6
(Austria) B Schett	0	4
(Switzerland) M Hingis	6	7^{7}
(United States) J Watanabe	0	6^{2}
(United States) S Cacic	6	6
(Sweden) Å Carlsson	2	2
WC	(Australia) A Ellwood	0	2
14	(United States) A Frazier	6	6

Second round
8	(Belarus) N Zvereva	6	6
(Italy) S Farina	4	2
(Austria) J Wiesner	6	6
(United States) S Stafford	4	0
(Japan) K Nagatsuka	6	6
(Switzerland) M Hingis	3	4
(United States) S Cacic	3	7	4
14	(United States) A Frazier	6	5	6

Third round
8	(Belarus) N Zvereva	4	7^{7}	6
(Austria) J Wiesner	6	6^{3}	4
(Japan) K Nagatsuka	6	6
14	(United States) A Frazier	3	3

Fourth round
8	(Belarus) N Zvereva	3	6	6
(Japan) K Nagatsuka	6	3	1

==== Section 6 ====
First round
10	(Germany) A Huber	6	6
(Czech Republic) L Richterová	2	4
WC	(Australia) S Drake-Brockman	2	6	6
Q	(Japan) N Kijimuta	6	4	3
WC	(Australia) N Bradtke	6	6
(Slovakia) K Studeníková	0	1
(Indonesia) N Basuki	3	6	6
(United States) G Helgeson-Nielsen	6	1	4
(Argentina) P Tarabini	6	6
WC	(Australia) N Pratt	0	1
Q	(Madagascar) D Randriantefy	6	7^{7}
(Argentina) F Labat	3	6^{5}
(South Africa) E Reinach	3	6	6
(Australia) R McQuillan	6	0	4
(Slovenia) T Križan	1	0
4	(France) M Pierce	6	6

Second round
10	(Germany) A Huber	6	6
WC	(Australia) S Drake-Brockman	1	0
WC	(Australia) N Bradtke	5	4
(Indonesia) N Basuki	7	6
(Argentina) P Tarabini	2	0
Q	(Madagascar) D Randriantefy	6	6
(South Africa) E Reinach	1	2
4	(France) M Pierce	6	6

Third round
10	(Germany) A Huber	6	6
(Indonesia) N Basuki	0	1
Q	(Madagascar) D Randriantefy	3	3
4	(France) M Pierce	6	6

Fourth round
10	(Germany) A Huber	2	4
4	(France) M Pierce	6	6

==== Section 7 ====
First round
6	(United States) L Davenport	4	6	6
(United States) D Graham	6	3	2
(Germany) W Probst	6	6
Q	(United States) E Hakami	3	2
(Netherlands) M Oremans	3	6	6
(Chinese Taipei) S-t Wang	6	3	3
(France) S Testud	6	6
(Netherlands) C Vis	4	0
(Israel) A Smashnova	6^{5}	6	6
(Bulgaria) E Pampoulova	7^{7}	3	3
(France) S Pitkowski	6	6
Q	(Japan) H Nagano	3	3
(Argentina) B Fulco-Villella	6	6
(France) N van Lottum	1	3
(Germany) K Kschwendt	3	2
12	(Netherlands) B Schultz	6	6

Second round
6	(United States) L Davenport	6	6
(Germany) W Probst	2	2
(Netherlands) M Oremans	4	6^{3}
(France) S Testud	6	7^{7}
(Israel) A Smashnova	7	7
(France) S Pitkowski	5	5
(Argentina) B Fulco-Villella	1	4
12	(Netherlands) B Schultz	6	6

Third round
6	(United States) L Davenport	6	6
(France) S Testud	3	4
(Israel) A Smashnova	2	2
12	(Netherlands) B Schultz	6	6

Fourth round
6	(United States) L Davenport	6	3	6
12	(Netherlands) B Schultz	2	6	2

==== Section 8 ====
First round
16	(France) J Halard	0	5
(Romania) I Spîrlea	6	7
(Russia) E Maniokova	7	2	6
LL	(Argentina) M Paz	5	6	4
(Austria) B Reinstadler	6	7^{7}
(Czech Republic) P Langrová	1	6^{3}
(Japan) Y Kamio	7^{7}	6
(Bulgaria) K Maleeva	6^{4}	1
(Netherlands) K Boogert	6	4	6
(Italy) L Ferrando	0	6	0
(Netherlands) M Bollegraf	7^{7}	7
(Netherlands) S Rottier	6^{2}	5
(Germany) V Martinek	7	6
(Latvia) L Neiland	5	3
(Germany) B Rittner	3	2
2	(Spain) C Martínez	6	6

Second round
(Romania) I Spîrlea	6	6
(Russia) E Maniokova	0	2
(Austria) B Reinstadler	6	4	3
(Japan) Y Kamio	4	6	6
(Netherlands) K Boogert	6	6
(Netherlands) M Bollegraf	3	0
(Germany) V Martinek	1	3
2	(Spain) C Martínez	6	6

Third round
(Romania) I Spîrlea	2	6	6
(Japan) Y Kamio	6	3	3
(Netherlands) K Boogert	3	6	3
2	(Spain) C Martínez	6	2	6

Fourth round
(Romania) I Spîrlea	2	7^{7}	2
2	(Spain) C Martínez	6	6^{3}	6

Preceded by 1994 US Open – Women's singles	Grand Slam women's singles	Succeeded by 1995 French Open – Women's singles
