= Ludmila Varmužová =

Czech/Sammarinese tennis player

- Country (sports): Czech Republic; San Marino
- Born: 25 February 1979 (age 47) Gottwaldov, Czechoslovakia
- Turned pro: 1993
- Retired: 2001
- Prize money: $88,227

Singles
- Career record: 92–109
- Career titles: 1 ITF
- Highest ranking: No. 159 (14 July 1997)

Grand Slam singles results
- Australian Open: Q2 (1997)
- French Open: Q1 (1997)
- Wimbledon: Q2 (1997)
- US Open: Q2 (1995)

Doubles
- Career record: 41–47
- Career titles: 0
- Highest ranking: No. 189 (7 August 1995)

Grand Slam doubles results
- Australian Open Junior: W (1994, 1995)
- French Open Junior: W (1995)
- Wimbledon Junior: F (1994)
- US Open Junior: W (1995)
- Last updated on: 3 Jun 2026.

Ludmila Varmužová (also known as Ludmilla Varmuza; born 25 February 1979) is a retired tennis player who represented the Czech Republic as well as San Marino during her career.

As a junior, Varmužová appeared at the finals of all four Grand Slam girls' doubles events. She won at the Australian Open in 1994 and 1995, the French Open and the US Open in 1995, and was a finalist at Wimbledon in 1994.

After turning professional, Varmužová never qualified for the main draw of a Grand Slam championship, but she did win one ITF tournament, a $50k event at Jakarta, Indonesia, in 1996.

== ITF finals ==
=== Singles (1–2) ===
Legend $50,000 tournaments $25,000 tournaments	Finals by surface Hard (1–1) Clay (0–1)

Result	Date	Tournament	Surface	Opponent	Score
Win	5 August 1996	ITF Jakarta 2, Indonesia	Hard	(Thailand) Tamarine Tanasugarn	6–2, 6–4
Loss	30 June 1997	ITF Campinas, Brazil	Clay	(Paraguay) Larissa Schaerer	4–6, 1–6
Loss	4 May 1998	ITF Tampico, Mexico	Hard	(United States) Sarah Taylor	6–4, 4–6, 1–4 ret.

=== Doubles (0–4) ===
Legend $50,000 tournaments $25,000 tournaments	Finals by surface Hard (0–3) Carpet (0–1)

Result	Date	Tournament	Surface	Partner	Opponents	Score
Loss	20 February 1995	ITF Newcastle, United Kingdom	Carpet (i)	(Czech Republic) Sandra Kleinová	(Netherlands) Seda Noorlander (Greece) Christína Papadáki	6–7^{(3–7)}, 3–6
Loss	24 July 1995	ITF Istanbul 2, Turkey	Hard	(Japan) Yoriko Yamagishi	(Italy) Emanuela Brusati (Italy) Maria Paola Zavagli	6–7^{(5–7)}, 3–6
Loss	4 March 1996	ITF Rockford, United States	Hard	(Russia) Anna Kournikova	(United States) Elly Hakami (United Kingdom) Valda Lake	2–6, 3–6
Loss	6 April 1998	Dubai Tennis Challenge, United Arab Emirates	Hard	(Hungary) Petra Gáspár	(Indonesia) Wynne Prakusya (Thailand) Benjamas Sangaram	6–7^{(1–7)}, 6–1, 3–6

== Junior Grand Slam tournament finals ==
=== Doubles: 6 (4 titles, 2 runner-ups) ===
Result	Year	Tournament	Surface	Partner	Opponents	Score
Win	1994	Australian Open	Hard	(United States) Corina Morariu	(Netherlands) Yvette Basting (Germany) Alexandra Schneider	7–5, 2–6, 7–5
Loss	1994	Wimbledon	Grass	(United States) Corina Morariu	(South Africa) Nannie de Villiers (United Kingdom) Lizzie Jelfs	3–6, 4–6
Win	1995	Australian Open	Hard	(United States) Corina Morariu	(Japan) Saori Obata (Japan) Nami Urabe	6–1, 6–2
Win	1995	French Open	Clay	(United States) Corina Morariu	(Italy) Alice Canepa (Italy) Giulia Casoni	7–6, 7–5
Win	1995	US Open	Hard	(United States) Corina Morariu	(Russia) Anna Kournikova (Poland) Aleksandra Olsza	6–3, 6–3
Loss	1996	French Open	Clay	(Russia) Anna Kournikova	(Italy) Alice Canepa (Italy) Giulia Casoni	2–6, 7–5, 5–7
