= Zuzana Nemšáková =

Slovak tennis player

- Country (sports): Czechoslovakia; Slovakia
- Born: 14 September 1976 (age 48)
- Prize money: $16,412

Singles
- Career record: 51–44
- Career titles: 2 ITF
- Highest ranking: No. 272 (4 April 1994)

Doubles
- Career record: 36–22
- Career titles: 2 ITF
- Highest ranking: No. 293 (11 September 1995)

Zuzana Nemšáková (born 14 September 1976) is a Slovak former professional tennis player.

Nemšáková, a Wimbledon junior semi-finalist, competed on the professional tour during the 1990s and reached a best singles ranking of 272 in the world. She made her only WTA Tour main draw appearance at the Prague Open in 1992, where she was beaten in the first round of the singles by Noëlle van Lottum.

== ITF finals ==
=== Singles: 4 (2–2) ===
Result	No.	Date	Tournament	Surface	Opponent	Score
Win	1.	30 August 1992	Gryfino, Poland	Clay	(Netherlands) Lara Bitter	6–4, 6–0
Loss	1.	18 April 1993	Wels, Austria	Hard (i)	(Austria) Petra Schwarz	2–6, 6–1, 4–6
Win	2.	23 May 1993	Katowice, Poland	Clay	(Poland) Monika Starosta	Walkover
Loss	2.	30 August 1993	Bad Nauheim, Germany	Clay	(Germany) Sabine Gerke	1–6, 2–6

=== Doubles: 8 (2–6) ===
Result	No.	Date	Tournament	Surface	Partner	Opponents	Score
Loss	1.	24 August 1992	Gryfino, Poland	Clay	(Czechoslovakia) Miroslava Kočí	(Poland) Isabela Listowska (Germany) Petra Winzenhöller	6–7^{(2)}, 7–6^{(5)}, 5–7
Win	1.	12 April 1993	Neudörfl, Austria	Clay	(Czech Republic) Lenka Němečková	(Czech Republic) Pavlína Rajzlová (Czech Republic) Ivana Havrlíková	4–6, 6–4, 6–2
Loss	2.	19 September 1993	Sofia, Bulgaria	Clay	(Slovakia) Patrícia Marková	(Bulgaria) Galia Angelova (Bulgaria) Lubomira Bacheva	0–6, 5–7
Loss	3.	22 May 1994	Katowice, Poland	Clay	(Slovakia) Nora Kovařčíková	(Czech Republic) Lenka Cenková (Czech Republic) Alena Vašková	Not known
Loss	4.	20 March 1995	Castellón, Spain	Clay	(Slovakia) Tatiana Zelenayová	(Italy) Gloria Pizzichini (Italy) Sara Ventura	3–6, 3–6
Win	2.	8 May 1995	Nitra, Slovakia	Clay	(Slovakia) Tatiana Zelenayová	(Czech Republic) Zuzana Hejdová (Czech Republic) Romana Černošková	6–3, 6–3
Loss	5.	7 August 1995	Rebecq, Belgium	Clay	(Slovakia) Martina Nedelková	(Ukraine) Angelina Zdorovitskaia (Ukraine) Anna Zaporozhanova	2–6, 4–6
Loss	6.	20 August 1995	Koksijde, Belgium	Clay	(Slovakia) Martina Nedelková	(United States) Meredith Geiger (United States) Kristin Osmond	6–4, 4–6, 3–6
