= Amanda Basica =

American tennis player

- Country (sports): United States
- Born: 20 June 1978 (age 46)
- Height: 5 ft 9 in (175 cm)
- Plays: Right-handed
- Prize money: $14,362

Singles
- Highest ranking: No. 442 (Feb 20, 1995)

Grand Slam singles results
- US Open: Q2 (1994)

Doubles
- Highest ranking: No. 776 (Sep 16, 1996)

Amanda Basica (born June 20, 1978) is an American former professional tennis player.

Basica, who grew up in Los Angeles County, won the USTA Girls’ 16 National Championships in 1992 and was a junior semi-finalist at the 1993 French Open, losing in three sets to Martina Hingis. She was ranked by the ITF as the world's 10th ranked junior at the end of 1994 and won the 1995 Easter Bowl 18s title.

On the professional tour, Basica reached a best world ranking of 442. She made WTA Tour main draw appearances in 1993 as a singles wildcard at Stratton Mountain and Oakland. In qualifying at the 1997 Acura Classic she lost to Serena Williams, which was the future world number one's first match win at WTA Tour level.

Basica was an All-American tennis player for both the Florida Gators and UCLA Bruins.
