= Siobhan Drake-Brockman =

Australian tennis player (born 1978)

- Country (sports): Australia
- Born: 7 April 1978 (age 48)
- Plays: Right-handed
- Prize money: $118,132

Singles
- Career record: 101–102
- Career titles: 1 ITF
- Highest ranking: No. 109 (8 September 1997)

Grand Slam singles results
- Australian Open: 2R (1995, 1996)

Doubles
- Career record: 25–41
- Career titles: 1 ITF
- Highest ranking: No. 215 (11 September 1995)

Grand Slam doubles results
- Australian Open: 2R (1995)

Siobhan Drake-Brockman (born 7 April 1978) is a former professional tennis player from Australia. She won the girls' singles title at the 1995 Australian Open.

== Biography ==
Drake-Brockman, a right-handed player out of Bunbury, Western Australia, attended St Hilda's Anglican School in Perth and was a member of the Australian team which won the World Youth Cup in 1993.

At the age of 16, she defeated world No. 61, Rachel McQuillan, to win the $25k tournament in Port Pirie in 1994.

She made her WTA Tour main-draw debut in one of the opening tournaments of the 1995 season, the Tasmanian International, held in Hobart. At the 1995 Australian Open, she was granted a wildcard into the women's singles and made the second round, with a win over Japanese qualifier Naoko Kijimuta. She then won the Australian Open girls' singles title, by beating World Youth Cup teammate Annabel Ellwood in the final.

In 1996, she made the second round again at the Australian Open and competed that year mostly on the ITF Circuit.

She had her best season in 1997 when her ranking rose to a career high 109 in the world, with appearances in the main draws of WTA Tour tournaments in Hobart, Birmingham, Stanford, San Diego and Surabaya.

Retiring from tennis in 1998, Drake-Brockman has a law degree from the University of Western Australia and works as a contracts engineer in Perth.

== ITF Circuit finals ==
$25,000 tournaments
$10,000 tournaments

=== Singles (1–2) ===
Result	Date	Location	Surface	Opponent	Score
Loss	16 October 1994	Tokyo, Japan	Hard	(Australia) Annabel Ellwood	6–2, 3–6, 4–6
Win	4 December 1994	Port Pirie, Australia	Hard	(Australia) Rachel McQuillan	6–4, 6–2
Loss	9 March 1997	Rockford, United States	Hard	(Canada) Sonya Jeyaseelan	6–7, 3–6

=== Doubles (1–1) ===
Result	Date	Location	Surface	Partner	Opponents	Score
Loss	18 March 1996	Reims, France	Hard (i)	(France) Catherine Tanvier	(Italy) Giulia Casoni (Italy) Flora Perfetti	3–6, 6–4, 0–6
Win	5 July 1998	Edmond, US	Hard	(Australia) Melissa Beadman	(Australia) Gail Biggs (Australia) Bryanne Stewart	7–6, 7–6
