= Stephanie Mabry =

American tennis player (born 1979)

- Full name: Stephanie Lynn Mabry (Halsell)
- Country (sports): United States
- Born: October 23, 1979 (age 46) Houston, Texas, U.S.
- Height: 5 ft 2 in (1.57 m)
- Plays: Right-handed
- Prize money: $57,309

Singles
- Highest ranking: No. 175 (May 26, 1997)

Doubles
- Highest ranking: No. 294 (April 30, 2001)

Grand Slam doubles results
- US Open: 1R (1995)

Stephanie Lynn Mabry (born October 23, 1979) is a former professional tennis player from the United States. She was known as Stephanie Halsell during her junior career, but changed her surname to Mabry around the time she turned professional.

== Biography ==
Born in Houston, Mabry won several major junior tournaments, including the Les Petit As and Orange Bowl. When Mabry won the 18s Easter Bowl in 1994, at the age of 14, she became the youngest player in history to claim the title.

Mabry made her WTA Tour main draw debut as a 15-year old at the 1995 Lipton Championships and took Åsa Carlsson (Svensson) to a third set tiebreak in a first round loss.

At the 1995 US Open, she and junior partner Lilia Osterloh featured as wildcards in the women's doubles main draw, as well as making the semi-finals together in the girls' doubles event.

Competing as a professional, she reached a top ranking of 175 in the world in 1997, winning six ITF singles titles.
