= Chantal Reuter =

Dutch tennis player

- Country (sports): Netherlands
- Born: 5 May 1978 (age 46); Amsterdam, Netherlands
- Plays: Right-handed

Singles
- Career titles: 3 ITF
- Highest ranking: No. 408 (30 January 1995)

Chantal Reuter (born 5 May 1978) is a Dutch former professional tennis player.

Born in Amsterdam, Reuter won the girls' doubles title at the 1994 US Open (with Surina De Beer).

Reuter, a right-handed player, competed briefly on the professional tour in the early 1990s, where she won three ITF singles titles and reached a best ranking of 408 in the world.

== ITF finals ==
=== Singles: 3 (3–0) ===
Result	No.	Date	Tournament	Surface	Opponent	Score
Win	1.	15 March 1993	Zaragoza, Spain	Clay	(Spain) Gala León García	6–3, 4–6, 6–3
Win	2.	14 February 1994	Faro, Portugal	Hard	(Germany) Antonela Voina	6–4, 6–7^{(1)}, 6–3
Win	3.	28 February 1994	Büchen, Germany	Carpet	(United Kingdom) Lorna Woodroffe	6–7, 6–2, 7–5
