= Lizzie Jelfs =

British tennis player

Elizabeth Coulson
- Full name: Elizabeth Coulson (nee Jelfs)
- Country (sports): Great Britain
- Born: 28 July 1976 (age 49); Banbury, Oxfordshire, England
- Prize money: $48,134

Singles
- Career record: 95-100
- Highest ranking: No. 207 (11 September 1995)

Grand Slam singles results
- Wimbledon: 1R (1995)

Doubles
- Career record: 105-58
- Career titles: 12 ITF
- Highest ranking: No. 200 (3 November 1997)

Grand Slam mixed doubles results
- Wimbledon: 2R (1998)

Elizabeth Coulson (née Jelfs; born 28 July 1976) is a British former professional tennis player.

== Biography ==
=== Tennis career ===
Elizabeth Coulson, who is originally from Banbury, won the girls' doubles title at the 1994 Wimbledon Championships. She and South African partner Nannie de Villiers defeated Corina Morariu and Ludmila Varmužová in the final. The same pair were also runner-up in the girls' doubles at the 1995 US Open.

In 1995 she appeared in the main draw of three WTA Tour tournaments in the lead up to Wimbledon. She qualified as a lucky loser for the singles at the British Clay Court Championships, then received a wildcard into the doubles at Birmingham with Karen Cross, before winning her way through qualifying to play singles in Eastbourne. On the back of these performances, she was granted a wildcard spot into the 1995 Wimbledon Championships and was beaten in the first round by Christina Singer. Later in the year, she surpassed Clare Wood as Britain's top-ranked female player.

She played again at Wimbledon in 1998 when she featured in the mixed doubles, partnering Jamie Delgado. They made the second round, with a win over Francisco Montana and Caroline Schneider.

=== Personal life ===
Coulson studied Sports Science/Recreational Management at Loughborough University and has worked as an events manager.

== ITF Circuit finals ==
$25,000 tournaments
$10,000 tournaments

=== Singles: 4 (4 runner-ups) ===
Result	No.	Date	Tournament	Surface	Opponent	Score
Loss	1.	1 February 1993	ITF Newcastle, United Kingdom	Carpet (i)	(Netherlands) Gaby Coorengel	1–6, 2–6
Loss	2.	24 July 1995	ITF Salvador, Brazil	Hard	(Mexico) Lucila Becerra	4–6, 3–6
Loss	3.	27 April 1998	ITF Hatfield, United Kingdom	Clay	(Spain) Mariam Ramón Climent	1–6, 6–1, 3–6
Loss	4.	31 August 1998	ITF Xanthi, Greece	Hard	(Greece) Eleni Daniilidou	2–6, 0–6

=== Doubles: 15 (12 titles, 3 runner-ups) ===
Result	No.	Date	Tournament	Surface	Partner	Opponents	Score
Loss	1.	24 April 1995	ITF Edinburgh, United Kingdom	Clay	(United Kingdom) Karen Cross	(Australia) Robyn Mawdsley (United Kingdom) Lorna Woodroffe	3–6, 1–6
Win	2.	8 May 1995	ITF Edinburgh, United Kingdom	Clay	(United Kingdom) Karen Cross	(United Kingdom) Kaye Hand (United Kingdom) Claire Taylor	3–6, 6–3, 6–0
Win	3.	13 April 1997	ITF Jakarta, Indonesia	Hard	(United Kingdom) Jasmine Choudhury	(South Korea) Won Kyung-joo (South Korea) Cho Yoon-jeong	6–4, 7–6
Win	4.	8 July 1997	ITF Felixstowe, United Kingdom	Grass	(South Africa) Surina De Beer	(United Kingdom) Helen Crook (United Kingdom) Victoria Davies	7–5, 7–5
Win	5.	21 July 1997	ITF Dublin, Ireland	Grass	(South Africa) Surina De Beer	(United States) Amanda Augustus (Australia) Amy Jensen	6–3, 4–6, 6–4
Loss	6.	29 September 1997	ITF Nottingham, United Kingdom	Hard (i)	(United Kingdom) Karen Cross	(United Kingdom) Lucie Ahl (United Kingdom) Joanne Ward	6–7^{(8–6)}, 2–6
Win	7.	25 April 1998	ITF Bournemouth, United Kingdom	Clay	(South Africa) Mareze Joubert	(Israel) Limor Gabai (United Kingdom) Kate Warne-Holland	6–3, 6–3
Loss	8.	27 April 1998	ITF Hatfield, United Kingdom	Clay	(United Kingdom) Amanda Keen	(Argentina) Celeste Contín (Spain) Mariam Ramón Climent	6–3, 3–6, 4–6
Win	9.	18 July 1998	ITF Frinton, United Kingdom	Grass	(South Africa) Mareze Joubert	(United Kingdom) Lucie Ahl (United Kingdom) Amanda Wainwright	6–2, 7–5
Win	10.	27 July 1998	ITF Ilkley, United Kingdom	Grass	(South Africa) Mareze Joubert	(United Kingdom) Helen Crook (United Kingdom) Victoria Davies	6–3, 6–4
Win	11.	3 August 1998	ITF Southsea, United Kingdom	Grass	(South Africa) Mareze Joubert	(Greece) Eleni Daniilidou (United Kingdom) Lucy Wood	6–2, 6–3
Win	12.	21 September 1998	ITF Sunderland, United Kingdom	Hard	(South Africa) Mareze Joubert	(United Kingdom) Helen Crook (United Kingdom) Victoria Davies	6–1, 6–1
Win	13.	1 February 1999	ITF Sheffield, United Kingdom	Hard (i)	(United Kingdom) Lorna Woodroffe	(South Africa) Surina De Beer (Netherlands) Kim de Weille	3–6, 6–4, 6–3
Win	14.	5 April 1999	ITF Cerignola, Italy	Clay	(United Kingdom) Jasmine Choudhury	(Russia) Irina Kornienko (Russia) Lina Krasnoroutskaya	7–5, 7–5
Win	15.	3 October 1999	ITF Glasgow, United Kingdom	Carpet (i)	(Republic of Ireland) Karen Nugent	(Germany) Gréta Arn (India) Manisha Malhotra	w/o
