= Yvette Basting =

Dutch tennis player (born 1977)

- Country (sports): Netherlands
- Residence: Oosterhout, Netherlands
- Born: 8 June 1977 (age 47); Breda, Netherlands
- Height: 1.75 m (5 ft 9 in)
- Turned pro: 1993
- Retired: 2002
- Plays: Right (two-handed backhand)
- Prize money: $166,523

Singles
- Career record: 206–130
- Career titles: 8 ITF
- Highest ranking: No. 92 (5 March 2001)

Grand Slam singles results
- Australian Open: 1R (1995, 2001)
- Wimbledon: 2R (2000)

Doubles
- Career record: 92–75
- Career titles: 9 ITF
- Highest ranking: No. 106 (28 May 2001)

Grand Slam doubles results
- Australian Open: 2R (2001)
- Wimbledon: 1R (1995)

Yvette Basting (born 8 June 1977) is a retired tennis player from the Netherlands. During her professional career from 1992–2002, she won seventeen titles on the ITF Women's Circuit and qualified twice for the Australian Open and Wimbledon.

== Career highlights ==
On 5 March 2001, Basting reached her highest singles ranking: world No. 92. Her best doubles ranking came on 28 May 2001, when she became world No. 106. In her career, Yvette Basting reached fourteen singles finals on ITF Women's Circuit, winning eight titles. In 1994, she won the $25k tournaments in Flensburg, Germany and Poitiers, France.

In 1999, Basting won the $25k Jaffa tournament in Israel, and in 2000, she won the $25k Pamplona event in Spain and the $50k Naples tournament in the United States.

In October 2000, with her partner Katalin Marosi, she won the $75k Poitiers.

In February 2001, partnering Elena Tatarkova, she won the $75k Dow Tennis Classic in Midland, Michigan. In March 2001, Basting and Tatarkova won the $50k Minneapolis doubles title.

== ITF Circuit finals ==
Legend
$100,000 tournaments
$75,000 tournaments
$50,000 tournaments
$25,000 tournaments
$10,000 tournaments

=== Singles (8–6) ===
| Result | No. | Date | Location | Surface | Opponent | Score |
|---|---|---|---|---|---|---|
| Win | 1. | 28 June 1993 | Velp, Netherlands | Clay | (Czech Republic) Lenka Němečková | 6–0, 7–5 |
| Win | 2. | 23 August 1993 | Horb, Germany | Clay | (Czech Republic) Monika Kratochvílová | 6–1, 7–6 |
| Win | 3. | 17 October 1994 | Flensburg, Germany | Carpet (i) | (Netherlands) Kim de Weille | 4–6, 7–5, 6–0 |
| Win | 4. | 24 October 1994 | Poitiers, France | Hard (i) | (Netherlands) Kim de Weille | 6–1, 5–7, 6–4 |
| Loss | 5. | 14 November 1994 | Eastbourne, Great Britain | Carpet (i) | (Netherlands) Kim de Weille | 1–6, 4–6 |
| Loss | 6. | 30 June 1997 | Hoorn, Netherlands | Clay | (Spain) Eva Bes | 2–6, 3–6 |
| Loss | 7. | 7 July 1997 | Amersfoort, Netherlands | Clay | (Netherlands) Nathalie Thijssen | 1–6, 3–6 |
| Loss | 8. | 13 October 1997 | Saint Raphaël, France | Hard (i) | (France) Sophie Erre | 1–6, 4–6 |
| Win | 9. | 22 June 1998 | Velp, Netherlands | Clay | (Netherlands) Andrea van den Hurk | 6–1, 5–7, 6–2 |
| Loss | 10. | 29 June 1998 | Alkmaar, Netherlands | Clay | (Bulgaria) Dessislava Topalova | 6–7^{(3–7)}, 2–6 |
| DNP | – | 12 July 1998 | Amersfoort, Netherlands | Clay | (Slovakia) Martina Suchá | — |
| Win | 11. | 1 November 1999 | Jaffa, Israel | Hard | (Italy) Francesca Schiavone | 6–3, 6–4 |
| Win | 12. | 24 July 2000 | Pamplona, Spain | Hard | (Australia) Anastasia Rodionova | 6–4, 6–1 |
| Win | 13. | 13 November 2000 | Naples, United States | Clay | (Colombia) Catalina Castaño | 4–0, 4–1, 4–2 |
| Loss | 14. | 26 February 2001 | Minneapolis, United States | Hard (i) | (United States) Dawn Buth | 6–4, 5–7, 4–6 |

=== Doubles (9–6) ===
| Result | No. | Date | Location | Surface | Partner | Opponents | Score |
|---|---|---|---|---|---|---|---|
| Win | 1. | 23 August 1993 | Horb, Germany | Clay | (Netherlands) Annemarie Mikkers | (Peru) Lorena Rodriguez (Finland) Katrina Saarinen | 4–6, 7–5, 7–5 |
| Loss | 2. | 25 September 1995 | Bratislava, Slovakia | Clay | (Poland) Magdalena Grzybowska | (Czech Republic) Petra Langrová (Slovakia) Radka Zrubáková | 3–6, 1–6 |
| Win | 3. | 16 October 1995 | Flensburg, Germany | Carpet (i) | (Ukraine) Elena Tatarkova | (Germany) Sandra Klösel (France) Amélie Mauresmo | 6–4, 2–6, 6–2 |
| Loss | 4. | 25 February 1996 | Redbridge, Great Britain | Hard | (Netherlands) Kim de Weille | (Italy) Laura Golarsa (United States) Julie Steven | 3–6, 4–6 |
| Win | 5. | 5 July 1997 | Hoorn, Netherlands | Clay | (Slovakia) Simona Galiková | (Netherlands) Kim Kilsdonk (Netherlands) Jolanda Mens | 1–6, 6–1, 4–6 |
| Loss | 6. | 7 September 1997 | Supetar, Croatia | Clay | (Netherlands) Lotty Seelen | (Czech Republic) Darina Mecekova (Slovakia) Silvia Sosnarova | 3–6, 6–4, 2–6 |
| Loss | 7. | 29 April 1997 | Zadar, Croatia | Clay | (Netherlands) Susanne Trik | (Croatia) Jelena Kostanić Tošić (Slovenia) Katarina Srebotnik | 5–7, 5–7 |
| Loss | 8. | 19 April 1998 | Cagnes-sur-Mer, France | Clay | (Czech Republic) Magdalena Zděnovcová | (United Kingdom) Helen Crook (United Kingdom) Victoria Davies | 3–6, 3–6 |
| Win | 9. | 26 April 1998 | Gelos, France | Clay | (France) Emmanuelle Curutchet | (Belgium) Justine Henin (France) Aurélie Védy | 0–6, 7–6, 7–5 |
| Win | 10. | 5 July 1998 | Alkmaar, Netherlands | Clay | (Netherlands) Henriëtte van Aalderen | (Netherlands) Carlijn Buis (Netherlands) Andrea van den Hurk | 6–0, 6–1 |
| DNP | – | 12 July 1998 | Amersfoort, Netherlands | Clay | (Netherlands) Henriëtte van Aalderen | (Colombia) Giana Gutiérrez (Netherlands) Debby Haak | — |
| Loss | 11. | 12 June 2000 | Lenzerheide, Switzerland | Clay | (Netherlands) Andrea van den Hurk | (Germany) Mia Buric (Germany) Bianka Lamade | 5–7, 3–6 |
| Win | 12. | 24 July 2000 | Pamplona, Spain | Hard | (Germany) Mia Buric | (New Zealand) Leanne Baker (Colombia) Mariana Mesa | 6–2, 6–0 |
| Win | 13. | 15 October 2000 | Poitiers, France | Hard (i) | (Hungary) Katalin Marosi | (Hungary) Petra Mandula (Austria) Patricia Wartusch | 7–6^{(7–4)}, 6–1 |
| Win | 14. | 12 February 2001 | Midland, United States | Hard (i) | (Ukraine) Elena Tatarkova | (United States) Jennifer Hopkins (Slovenia) Petra Rampre | 3–6, 7–6^{(7–4)}, 6–4 |
| Win | 15. | 4 March 2001 | Minneapolis, United States | Hard (i) | (Ukraine) Elena Tatarkova | (Belgium) Laurence Courtois (Australia) Alicia Molik | 7–5, 7–6^{(7–0)} |
