= 1987 Australian Open – Men's singles qualifying =

Men's singles qualifying
- 1987 Australian Open

Events
| Singles | men | women | | boys | girls |
| Doubles | men | women | mixed | boys | girls |
| WC Singles | men | women | quad |
| WC Doubles | men | women | quad |
| Legends | men | women | mixed |

Qualification
| Singles | men | women |
- Australian Open

This article displays the qualifying draw for men's singles at the 1987 Australian Open.

== Seeds ==
1. (United States) Ken Flach (qualified)
2. (South Africa) Gary Muller (qualified)
3. (West Germany) Christian Saceanu (qualified)
4. (United Kingdom) Nick Fulwood (qualified)
5. (Australia) Peter Carter (qualifying competition)
6. (Australia) Craig A. Miller (second round)
7. (Canada) Chris Pridham (qualifying competition)
8. (United States) Cary Stansbury (qualifying competition)
9. (Australia) Charlton Eagle (qualified)
10. (Australia) Laurie Warder (qualified)
11. (United Kingdom) Stephen Botfield (second round)
12. (United Kingdom) Jason Goodall (second round)
13. (Australia) Antony Emerson (second round)
14. (United States) Steve Denton (qualified)
15. (United States) Richard Schmidt (second round)
16. (Australia) Russell Barlow (qualifying competition)
17. (United States) Danny Saltz (qualified)
18. (Japan) Shuzo Matsuoka (second round)
19. (United States) John Letts (qualified)
20. (Australia) Peter Thrupp (second round)
21. (Australia) Steve Furlong (qualifying competition)
22. (Australia) Mark Hartnett (second round)
23. (United Kingdom) Michael Walker (second round)
24. (United States) David Dowlen (qualifying competition)

== Qualifiers ==
1. (United States) Ken Flach
2. (South Africa) Gary Muller
3. (West Germany) Christian Saceanu
4. (United Kingdom) Nick Fulwood
5. (United States) John Letts
6. (Australia) David Macpherson
7. (Australia) Steve Wood
8. (United States) Danny Saltz
9. (Australia) Charlton Eagle
10. (Australia) Laurie Warder
11. (Australia) Mike Baroch
12. (United States) Steve Denton

== Qualifying draw ==
Key

- Q = Qualifier
- WC = Wild card
- LL = Lucky loser
- Alt = Alternate
- ITF = ITF entry
- PR = Protected ranking
- SR = Special ranking
- SE = Special exempt
- JE = Junior exempt
- JR = Junior Accelerator Programme entrant
- CO = College Accelerator Programme entrant
- NG = Next Gen Accelerator Program entrant
- w/o = Walkover
- r = Retired
- d = Defaulted

=== First qualifier ===
First round
(Australia) Richard Cahill | 4 | 4
(Australia) Adam Anderson | 6 | 6
(Australia) Roger Rasheed | 3 | 7^{7} | 21
(The Bahamas) Roger Smith | 6 | 6^{2} | 23

Second round
1 | (United States) Ken Flach | 6 | 7^{7}
(Australia) Adam Anderson | 4 | 6^{4}
(The Bahamas) Roger Smith | 4 | 6 | 3
24 | (United States) David Dowlen | 6 | 3 | 6

Qualifying competition
1 | (United States) Ken Flach | 6 | 6
24 | (United States) David Dowlen | 4 | 1

=== Second qualifier ===
First round
(Australia) John Stoddart | 6 | 6^{5} | 6
(Italy) Eugenio Rossi | 4 | 7^{7} | 4
(Australia) Kelly Durant | 4 | 2
(United States) Eric Korita | 6 | 6

Second round
2 | (South Africa) Gary Muller | 6 | 7^{7}
(Australia) John Stoddart | 4 | 6^{2}
(United States) Eric Korita | 7^{8} | 6^{2} | 6
23 | (United Kingdom) Michael Walker | 6^{6} | 7^{7} | 1

Qualifying competition
2 | (South Africa) Gary Muller | 6 | 6^{2} | 7
(United States) Eric Korita | 4 | 7^{7} | 5

=== Third qualifier ===
First round
WC | (Australia) Neil Prickett | 3 | 4
(Canada) Doug Burke | 6 | 6
(Australia) Carl Turich | 2 | 3
(Australia) Richard Fricker | 6 | 6

Second round
3 | (West Germany) Christian Saceanu | 6 | 6
(Canada) Doug Burke | 3 | 4
(Australia) Richard Fricker | 6 | 6
22 | (Australia) Mark Hartnett | 4 | 2

Qualifying competition
3 | (West Germany) Christian Saceanu | 6 | 6
(Australia) Richard Fricker | 1 | 4

=== Fourth qualifier ===
First round
WC | (Australia) John Arbanas | 6 | 3 | 2
WC | (Australia) Ron Woodbridge | 3 | 6 | 6
(Australia) Richard Fromberg | 6 | 2 | 3
(Australia) Paul Mick | 0 | 6 | 6

Second round
4 | (United Kingdom) Nick Fulwood | 6 | 6
WC | (Australia) Ron Woodbridge | 3 | 3
(Australia) Paul Mick | 6^{3} | 3
21 | (Australia) Steve Furlong | 7^{7} | 6

Qualifying competition
4 | (United Kingdom) Nick Fulwood | 6 | 6
21 | (Australia) Steve Furlong | 4 | 2

=== Fifth qualifier ===
First round
WC | (Australia) David Graham | 7^{10} | 6
(United States) Chris Kennedy | 6^{8} | 4
(Australia) Daryl Greeves | 2 | 3
(Australia) Andrew Ritter | 6 | 6

Second round
5 | (Australia) Peter Carter | 7^{7} | 6^{4} | 6
WC | (Australia) David Graham | 6^{5} | 7^{7} | 2
(Australia) Andrew Ritter | 3 | 1
19 | (United States) John Letts | 6 | 6

Qualifying competition
5 | (Australia) Peter Carter | 4 | 3
19 | (United States) John Letts | 6 | 6

=== Sixth qualifier ===
First round
(United Kingdom) Stuart Bale | 6 | 3 | 6
(Switzerland) Dominik Utzinger | 3 | 6 | 3

Second round
6 | (Australia) Craig A. Miller | 6 | 5 | 4
(United Kingdom) Stuart Bale | 3 | 7 | 6
(Australia) David Macpherson | 6 | 6
20 | (Australia) Peter Thrupp | 2 | 4

Qualifying competition
(United Kingdom) Stuart Bale | 4 | 7^{8} | 1
(Australia) David Macpherson | 6 | 6^{6} | 6

=== Seventh qualifier ===
First round
(Australia) Todd Woodbridge | 6 | 6
(Australia) Neil Borwick | 3 | 3
(West Germany) Karsten Saniter | 4 | 6^{3}
(Australia) Steve Wood | 6 | 7^{7}

Second round
7 | (Canada) Chris Pridham | 7 | 7^{7}
(Australia) Todd Woodbridge | 5 | 6^{5}
(Australia) Steve Wood | 7^{11} | 6
18 | (Japan) Shuzo Matsuoka | 6^{9} | 4

Qualifying competition
7 | (Canada) Chris Pridham | 1 | 3
(Australia) Steve Wood | 6 | 6

=== Eighth qualifier ===
First round
(Australia) Bryan Roe | 6 | 6^{1} | 6
WC | (Australia) Paul Lord | 3 | 7^{7} | 3
WC | (United States) Hank Pfister | 6 | 7
(United States) Tim Pawsat | 4 | 5

Second round
8 | (United States) Cary Stansbury | 6 | 7^{7}
(Australia) Bryan Roe | 1 | 6^{5}
WC | (United States) Hank Pfister | 4 | 6 | 5
17 | (United States) Danny Saltz | 6 | 3 | 7

Qualifying competition
8 | (United States) Cary Stansbury | 6^{3} | 4
17 | (United States) Danny Saltz | 7^{7} | 6

=== Ninth qualifier ===
First round
(Australia) Jason Carriage | 6 | 6
(Australia) Chris Fancutt | 4 | 4
(Australia) Jason McCarthy | 6 | 7
(Australia) Patrick Flynn | 3 | 5

Second round
9 | (Australia) Charlton Eagle | 7 | 6
(Australia) Jason Carriage | 5 | 0
(Australia) Jason McCarthy | 4 | 6^{2}
16 | (Australia) Russell Barlow | 6 | 7^{7}

Qualifying competition
9 | (Australia) Charlton Eagle | 6 | 7^{7}
16 | (Australia) Russell Barlow | 3 | 6^{5}

=== Tenth qualifier ===
First round
(Australia) Sean Karam | 2 | 5
(Australia) Peter Johnston | 6 | 7

Second round
10 | (Australia) Laurie Warder | 6 | 6
(Australia) Graeme Brimblecombe | 0 | 3
(Australia) Peter Johnston | 7^{7} | 6
15 | (United States) Richard Schmidt | 6^{5} | 3

Qualifying competition
10 | (Australia) Laurie Warder | 6 | 3 | 7
(Australia) Peter Johnston | 2 | 6 | 5

=== Eleventh qualifier ===
First round
(United Kingdom) David Felgate | 6 | 6
WC | (Australia) Andrew Cameron | 4 | 2

Second round
11 | (United Kingdom) Stephen Botfield | 4 | 7^{7} | 3
(Australia) Mike Baroch | 6 | 6^{4} | 6
(United Kingdom) David Felgate | 6 | 6
13 | (Australia) Antony Emerson | 3 | 4

Qualifying competition
(Australia) Mike Baroch | 7^{7} | 6^{7} | 6
(United Kingdom) David Felgate | 6^{2} | 7^{9} | 3

=== Twelfth qualifier ===
First round
(United States) Mike Smith | 6^{4} | 3
(Australia) Gavin Pfitzner | 7^{7} | 6
(Australia) Ian Peter-Budge | 4 | 6 | 6
(Australia) Michael Fancutt | 6 | 2 | 1

Second round
12 | (United Kingdom) Jason Goodall | 5 | 3
(Australia) Gavin Pfitzner | 7 | 6
(Australia) Ian Peter-Budge | 1 | 2
14 | (United States) Steve Denton | 6 | 6

Qualifying competition
(Australia) Gavin Pfitzner | 6 | 4 | 2
14 | (United States) Steve Denton | 4 | 6 | 6
