= 1986 in tennis =

This page covers all the important events in the sport of tennis in 1986. It provides the results of notable tournaments throughout the year on both the men's and the women's tennis circuits, the Davis Cup, and the Federation Cup.

== Australian Open ==
Category	Champion(s)	Finalist(s)	Score
Men's singles	(Sweden) Stefan Edberg	(Australia) Pat Cash	6–3, 6–4, 3–6, 5–7, 6–3 (Note: It was Edberg's 2nd career Grand Slam title and his 2nd Australian Open title.)
Women's singles	(Czechoslovakia) Hana Mandlíková	(United States) Martina Navratilova	7–5, 7–6^{(7–1)} (Note: It was Mandlíková's 4th career Grand Slam title and her 2nd and last Australian Open title.)
Men's doubles	(Sweden) Stefan Edberg (Sweden) Anders Järryd	(Australia) Peter Doohan (Australia) Laurie Warder	6–4, 6–4, 7–6^{(7–3)} (Note: It was Edberg's 3rd career Grand Slam title and his 3rd Australian Open title. It was Järryd's 2nd career Grand Slam title and his only Australian Open title.)
Women's doubles	(United States) Martina Navratilova (United States) Pam Shriver	(United States) Zina Garrison (United States) Lori McNeil	6–1, 6–0 (Note: It was Navratilova's 43rd career Grand Slam title and her 9th Australian Open title. It was Shriver's 15th career Grand Slam title and her 6th Australian Open title.)
Mixed doubles	(United States) Zina Garrison (United States) Sherwood Stewart	(United Kingdom) Anne Hobbs (United Kingdom) Andrew Castle	3–6, 7–6^{(7–5)}, 6–3 (Note: It was Garrison's 1st career Grand Slam title and her only Australian Open title. It was Stewart's 4th career Grand Slam title and his 2nd and last Australian Open title.)

== French Open ==
Category	Champion(s)	Finalist(s)	Score
Men's singles	(Czechoslovakia) Ivan Lendl	(Sweden) Mikael Pernfors	6–3, 6–2, 6–4 (Note: It was Lendl's 6th title of the year, and his 59th overall. It was his 3rd career Grand Slam title, and his 2nd French Open title.)
Women's singles	(United States) Chris Evert	(United States) Martina Navratilova	2–6, 6–3, 6–3. (Note: It was Evert's 18th (and last) career Grand Slam title, and her 7th French Open singles title (a record).)
Men's doubles	(Australia) John Fitzgerald (Czechoslovakia) Tomáš Šmíd	(Sweden) Stefan Edberg (Sweden) Anders Järryd	6–3, 4–6, 6–3, 6–7^{(4–7)}, 14–12
Women's doubles	(United States) Martina Navratilova (Hungary) Andrea Temesvári	(West Germany) Steffi Graf (Argentina) Gabriela Sabatini	6–1, 6–2
Mixed doubles	(United States) Kathy Jordan (United States) Ken Flach	(South Africa) Rosalyn Fairbank (Australia) Mark Edmondson	3–6, 7–6^{(7–3)}, 6–3

== Wimbledon ==
Category	Champion(s)	Finalist(s)	Score
Men's singles	(West Germany) Boris Becker	(Czechoslovakia) Ivan Lendl	6–4, 6–3, 7–5 (Note: It was Becker's 2nd career Grand Slam title and his 2nd consecutive Wimbledon title.)
Women's singles	(United States) Martina Navratilova	(Czechoslovakia) Hana Mandlíková	7–6^{(7–1)}, 6–3 (Note: It was Navratilova's 39th career Grand Slam title and her 7th Wimbledon single's title.)
Men's doubles	(Sweden) Joakim Nyström (Sweden) Mats Wilander	(United States) Gary Donnelly (United States) Peter Fleming	7–6^{(7–4)}, 6–3, 6–3 (Note: It was Nyström's only career Grand Slam title. It was Wilander's 5th career Grand Slam title and his only Wimbledon title.)
Women's doubles	(United States) Martina Navratilova (United States) Pam Shriver	(Czechoslovakia) Hana Mandlíková (Australia) Wendy Turnbull	6–1, 6–3 (Note: It was Navratilova's 40th career Grand Slam title and her 15th Wimbledon title. It was Shriver's 14th career Grand Slam title and her 5th Wimbledon title.)
Mixed doubles	(United States) Ken Flach (United States) Kathy Jordan	(Switzerland) Heinz Günthardt (United States) Martina Navratilova	6–3, 7–6^{(9–7)} (Note: It was Flach's 3rd career Grand Slam title and his 1st Wimbledon title. It was Jordan's 7th and last career Grand Slam title and her 3rd Wimbledon title.)

== US Open ==
Category	Champion(s)	Finalist(s)	Score
Men's singles	(Czechoslovakia) Ivan Lendl	(Czechoslovakia) Miloslav Mečíř	6–4, 6–2, 6–0 (Note: It was Lendl's 4th career Grand Slam title and his 2nd US Open title.)
Women's singles	(United States) Martina Navratilova	(Czechoslovakia) Helena Suková	6–3, 6–2 (Note: It was Navratilova's 41st career Grand Slam title and her 3rd US Open singles title.)
Men's doubles	(Ecuador) Andrés Gómez (Socialist Federal Republic of Yugoslavia) Slobodan Živojinović	(Sweden) Joakim Nyström (Sweden) Mats Wilander	4–6, 6–3, 6–3, 4–6, 6–3 (Note: It was Gómez's 1st career Grand Slam title and his only US Open title. It was Živojinović's only career Grand Slam title.)
Women's doubles	(United States) Martina Navratilova (United States) Pam Shriver	(Czechoslovakia) Hana Mandlíková (Australia) Wendy Turnbull	6–4, 3–6, 6–3 (Note: It was Navratilova's 42nd career Grand Slam title and her 10th US Open title. It was Shriver's 14th career Grand Slam title and her 3rd US Open title.)
Mixed doubles	(Italy) Raffaella Reggi (Spain) Sergio Casal	(United States) Martina Navratilova (United States) Peter Fleming	6–4, 6–4 (Note: It was Reggi's only career Grand Slam title. It was Casal's 1st career Grand Slam title and his 1st US Open title.)

== Davis Cup ==
First round 7–10 March
Mexico City, Mexico (clay)
West Germany	2
Mexico	3
Guayaquil, Ecuador (clay)
United States	3
Ecuador	2
Auckland, New Zealand (hard)
Australia	4
New Zealand	1
Telford, United Kingdom (indoor carpet)
Spain	1
Great Britain	4
Belgrade, Yugoslavia (indoor hard)
Soviet Union	2
Yugoslavia	3
Calcutta, India (grass)
India	1
Czechoslovakia	4
Palermo, Italy (clay)
Italy	4
Paraguay	1
Brøndby, Denmark (indoor carpet)
Denmark	0
Sweden	5

Quarterfinals; 18–20 July
Mexico City, Mexico (clay)
Mexico	1
United States	4
Wimbledon, United Kingdom (grass)
Australia	4
Great Britain	1
Sarajevo, Yugoslavia (indoor hard)
Yugoslavia	0
Czechoslovakia	5
Båstad, Sweden (clay)
Italy	0
Sweden	5

Semifinals; 3–5 October
Brisbane, Australia (grass)
United States	1
Australia	3
Prague, Czechoslovakia (clay)
Czechoslovakia	1
Sweden	4

Final; 26–28 December
Melbourne, Australia (grass)
Australia	3
Sweden	2

== Federation Cup ==
First Round
Czechoslovakia	3
Greece	0
Q	Malta	0
Switzerland	3
Great Britain	0
Denmark	3
Hungary	1
Australia	2
Netherlands	1
Canada	2
Japan	1
Austria	2
Q	Egypt	0
Q	South Korea	3
Q	Uruguay	0
Argentina	3
Bulgaria	2
Soviet Union	1
France	3
Sweden	0
Brazil	2
Q	Romania	1
Q	Belgium	0
West Germany	3
Italy	2
New Zealand	1
Q	Yugoslavia	3
Q	Poland	0
Spain	2
Q	Indonesia	1
Q	China	0
United States	3

Second Round
Czechoslovakia	3
Switzerland	0
Denmark	1
Australia	2
Canada	0
Austria	3
Q	South Korea	1
Argentina	2
Bulgaria	2
France	1
Brazil	1
West Germany	2
Italy	2
Q	Yugoslavia	0
Spain	0
United States	3

Quarterfinals
Czechoslovakia	3
Australia	0
Austria	0
Argentina	3
Bulgaria	1
West Germany	2
Italy	1
United States	2

Semifinals
Czechoslovakia	2
Argentina	1
West Germany	0
United States	3

Final
Czechoslovakia	0
United States	3
