= 1987 in tennis =

This page covers all the important events in the sport of tennis in 1987. It provides the results of notable tournaments throughout the year on both the men's and the women's tennis circuits, the Davis Cup, and the Federation Cup.

== Australian Open ==
Category	Champion(s)	Finalist(s)	Score
Men's singles	(Sweden) Stefan Edberg	(Australia) Pat Cash	6–3, 6–4, 3–6, 5–7, 6–3 (Note: It was Edberg's 2nd career Grand Slam title and his 2nd Australian Open title.)
Women's singles	(Czechoslovakia) Hana Mandlíková	(United States) Martina Navratilova	7–5, 7–6^{(7–1)} (Note: It was Mandlíková's 4th career Grand Slam title and her 2nd and last Australian Open title.)
Men's doubles	(Sweden) Stefan Edberg (Sweden) Anders Järryd	(Australia) Peter Doohan (Australia) Laurie Warder	6–4, 6–4, 7–6^{(7–3)} (Note: It was Edberg's 3rd career Grand Slam title and his 3rd Australian Open title. It was Järryd's 2nd career Grand Slam title and his only Australian Open title.)
Women's doubles	(United States) Martina Navratilova (United States) Pam Shriver	(United States) Zina Garrison (United States) Lori McNeil	6–1, 6–0 (Note: It was Navratilova's 43rd career Grand Slam title and her 9th Australian Open title. It was Shriver's 15th career Grand Slam title and her 6th Australian Open title.)
Mixed doubles	(United States) Zina Garrison (United States) Sherwood Stewart	(United Kingdom) Anne Hobbs (United Kingdom) Andrew Castle	3–6, 7–6^{(7–5)}, 6–3 (Note: It was Garrison's 1st career Grand Slam title and her only Australian Open title. It was Stewart's 4th career Grand Slam title and his 2nd and last Australian Open title.)

== French Open ==
Category	Champion(s)	Finalist(s)	Score
Men's singles	(Czechoslovakia) Ivan Lendl	(Sweden) Mats Wilander	7–5, 6–2, 3–6, 7–6^{(7–3)}. (Note: It was Lendl's 2nd title of the year, and his 64th overall. It was his 5th career Grand Slam title, and his 3rd French Open title.)
Women's singles	(West Germany) Steffi Graf	(United States) Martina Navratilova	6–4, 4–6, 8–6. (Note: It was Graf's 1st career Grand Slam title.)
Men's doubles	(Sweden) Anders Järryd (United States) Robert Seguso	(France) Guy Forget (France) Yannick Noah	6–7, 6–7, 6–3, 6–4, 6–2.
Women's doubles	(United States) Martina Navratilova (United States) Pam Shriver	(West Germany) Steffi Graf (Argentina) Gabriela Sabatini	6–2, 6–1.
Mixed doubles	(United States) Pam Shriver (Spain) Emilio Sánchez Vicario	(United States) Lori McNeil (United States) Sherwood Stewart	6–3, 7–6^{(7–4)}.

== Wimbledon ==
Category	Champion(s)	Finalist(s)	Score
Men's singles	(Australia) Pat Cash	(Czechoslovakia) Ivan Lendl	7–6^{(7–5)}, 6–2, 7–5 (Note: It was Cash's only career Grand Slam title.)
Women's singles	(United States) Martina Navratilova	(West Germany) Steffi Graf	7–5, 6–3 (Note: It was Navratilova's 45th career Grand Slam title and her 8th Wimbledon title.)
Men's doubles	(United States) Ken Flach (United States) Robert Seguso	(Spain) Sergio Casal (Spain) Emilio Sánchez	3–6, 6–7^{(6–8)}, 7–6^{(7–3)}, 6–1, 6–4 (Note: It was Flach's 4th career Grand Slam title and his 2nd Wimbledon title. It was Seguso's 3rd career Grand Slam title and his 1st Wimbledon title.)
Women's doubles	(West Germany) Claudia Kohde-Kilsch (Czechoslovakia) Helena Suková	(United States) Betsy Nagelsen (Australia) Elizabeth Smylie	7–5, 7–5 (Note: It was Kohde-Kilsch's 2nd and last career Grand Slam title and her only Wimbledon title. It was Suková's 2nd career Grand Slam title and her 1st Wimbledon title.)
Mixed doubles	(United Kingdom) Jeremy Bates (United Kingdom) Jo Durie	(Australia) Darren Cahill (Australia) Nicole Provis	7–6^{(12–10)}, 6–3 (Note: It was Bates' 1st career Grand Slam title and his only Wimbledon title. It was Durie's 1st career Grand Slam title and her only Wimbledon title.)

== US Open ==
Category	Champion(s)	Finalist(s)	Score
Men's singles	(Czechoslovakia) Ivan Lendl	(Sweden) Mats Wilander	6–7^{(7–9)}, 6–0, 7–6^{(7–4)}, 6–4 (Note: It was Lendl's 6th career Grand Slam title and his 3rd and final US Open title.)
Women's singles	(United States) Martina Navratilova	(West Germany) Steffi Graf	7–6^{(7–4)}, 6–1 (Note: It was Navratilova's 46th career Grand Slam title and her 11th US Open title.)
Men's doubles	(Sweden) Stefan Edberg (Sweden) Anders Järryd	(United States) Ken Flach (United States) Robert Seguso	7–6^{(7–1)}, 6–2, 4–6, 5–7, 7–6^{(7–2)} (Note: It was Edberg's 4th career Grand Slam title and his 1st US Open title. It was Järryd's 4th career Grand Slam title and his 1st US Open title.)
Women's doubles	(United States) Martina Navratilova (United States) Pam Shriver	(United States) Kathy Jordan (Australia) Elizabeth Smylie	5–7, 6–4, 6–2 (Note: It was Navratilova's 47th career Grand Slam title and her 12th US Open title. It was Shriver's 18th career Grand Slam title and her 4th US Open title.)
Mixed doubles	(United States) Martina Navratilova (Spain) Emilio Sánchez	(United States) Betsy Nagelsen (United States) Paul Annacone	6–4, 6–7^{(6–8)}, 7–6^{(14–12)} (Note: It was Navratilova's 48th career Grand Slam title and her 13th US Open title. It was Sánchez's 2nd career Grand Slam title and his 1st US Open title. Navratilova became only the third player in the Open Era to win the Triple Crown, winning the singles, women's doubles, and mixed doubles events at the same Grand Slam.)

== Davis Cup ==
First round 13–15 March
Prato, Italy (clay)
Sweden	3
Italy	2
Marcq-en-Barœul, France (indoor carpet)
France	5
South Korea	0
Asunción, Paraguay (clay)
United States	2
Paraguay	3
Barcelona, Spain (clay)
West Germany	2
Spain	3
New Delhi, India (grass)
India	3
Argentina	2
Hradec Králové, Czechoslovakia (indoor carpet)
Israel	3
Czechoslovakia	2
Mexico City, Mexico (clay)
Great Britain	0
Mexico	5
Adelaide, Australia (grass)
Yugoslavia	1
Australia	4

Quarterfinals; 24–26 July
Fréjus, France (clay)
Sweden	4
France	1
Caracas, Venezuela (clay)
Paraguay	2
Spain	3
New Delhi, India (grass)
India	4
Israel	0
Brisbane, Australia (grass)
Mexico	1
Australia	4

Semifinals; 2–4 October
Barcelona, Spain (clay)
Sweden	3
Spain	2
Sydney, Australia (grass)
India	3
Australia	2

Final; 18–20 December
Gothenburg, Sweden (indoor clay)
Sweden	5
India	0

== Federation Cup ==
First Round
United States	3
Japan	0
France	3
Austria	0
Great Britain	3
Q	Chile	0
Belgium	1
Italy	2
Bulgaria	2
Greece	1
Q	Ireland	0
Q	Indonesia	3
Q	Jamaica	0
Spain	3
Q	Denmark	0
Australia	3
Argentina	3
Q	Switzerland	0
Brazil	1
New Zealand	2
Q	Norway	1
Q	South Korea	2
Hong Kong	0
West Germany	3
Canada	3
Netherlands	0
Q	Israel	0
Soviet Union	3
Q	Poland	1
Yugoslavia	2
Sweden	0
Czechoslovakia	3

Second Round
United States	3
France	0
Great Britain	2
Italy	1
Bulgaria	2
Q	Indonesia	1
Spain	1
Australia	2
Argentina	3
New Zealand	0
Q	South Korea	0
West Germany	3
Canada	2
Soviet Union	1
Yugoslavia	0
Czechoslovakia	3

Quarterfinals
United States	3
Great Britain	0
Bulgaria	2
Australia	0
Argentina	1
West Germany	2
Canada	1
Czechoslovakia	2

Semifinals
United States	3
Bulgaria	0
West Germany	2
Czechoslovakia	1

Final
United States	1
West Germany	2
