= 1987 Australian Open – Women's singles qualifying =

Women's singles qualifying
- 1987 Australian Open

Events
Singles	men	women		boys	girls
Doubles	men	women	mixed	boys	girls
WC Singles	men	women	quad
WC Doubles	men	women	quad
Legends	men	women	mixed

Qualification
Singles	men	women
- Australian Open

This article displays the qualifying draw for women's singles at the 1987 Australian Open.

== Seeds ==
1. (United States) Heather Ludloff (qualified)
2. (Netherlands) Marianne van der Torre (qualified)
3. (United Kingdom) Julie Salmon (qualified)
4. (United States) Sandy Collins (qualified)
5. (United States) Susan Rimes (qualified)
6. (Japan) Yukie Koizumi (qualified)
7. (Czechoslovakia) Michaela Pazderová (qualified)
8. (New Zealand) Belinda Cordwell (qualified)

== Qualifiers ==
1. (United States) Heather Ludloff
2. (Japan) Yukie Koizumi
3. (United States) Sandy Collins
4. (Czechoslovakia) Michaela Pazderová
5. (United States) Susan Rimes
6. (United Kingdom) Julie Salmon
7. (New Zealand) Belinda Cordwell
8. (Netherlands) Marianne van der Torre

== Lucky losers ==
1. (France) Virginie Paquet

== Qualifying draw ==
Key

- Q = Qualifier
- WC = Wild card
- LL = Lucky loser
- Alt = Alternate
- ITF = ITF entry
- PR = Protected ranking
- SR = Special ranking
- SE = Special exempt
- JE = Junior exempt
- JR = Junior Accelerator Programme entrant
- CO = College Accelerator Programme entrant
- NG = Next Gen Accelerator Program entrant
- w/o = Walkover
- r = Retired
- d = Defaulted

=== First qualifier ===
First round
1	(United States) Heather Ludloff	6	6
(United Kingdom) Joy Tacon	1	1
(France) Virginie Paquet	6	6
(United States) Sheri Norris	4	3

Qualifying competition
1	(United States) Heather Ludloff	6	6
(France) Virginie Paquet	4	1

=== Second qualifier ===
First round
(Japan) Akemi Nishiya	7	6^{2}	7
WC	(Australia) Tracey Moyle	5	7^{7}	9
WC	(Australia) Paula Parentich	3	2
6	(Japan) Yukie Koizumi	6	6

Qualifying competition
WC	(Australia) Tracey Moyle	5	4
6	(Japan) Yukie Koizumi	7	6

=== Third qualifier ===
First round
4	(United States) Sandy Collins	6	6
(New Zealand) Ruth Seeman	3	4
(Australia) Genevieve Dwyer	6	5	5
(Czechoslovakia) Petra Tesařová	4	7	7

Qualifying competition
4	(United States) Sandy Collins	6	6
(Czechoslovakia) Petra Tesařová	0	0

=== Fourth qualifier ===
First round
WC	(Australia) Sharon McNamara	4	7^{7}	6
(Australia) Louise Pleming	6	6^{4}	0
Alt	(United Kingdom) Teresa Catlin	4	5
7	(Czechoslovakia) Michaela Pazderová	6	7

Qualifying competition
WC	(Australia) Sharon McNamara	1	5
7	(Czechoslovakia) Michaela Pazderová	6	7

=== Fifth qualifier ===
First round
5	(United States) Susan Rimes	6	6
(Japan) Naoko Sato	2	1
(Australia) Kristine Kunce	3	7^{7}	2
(Australia) Tracey Morton	6	6^{3}	6

Qualifying competition
5	(United States) Susan Rimes	6	3	6
(Australia) Tracey Morton	0	6	1

=== Sixth qualifier ===
First round
(Australia) Colleen Carney	6^{4}	6	6
(United States) Cynthia MacGregor	7^{7}	3	2
(Australia) Stephanie Faulkner	5	3
3	(United Kingdom) Julie Salmon	7	6

Qualifying competition
(Australia) Colleen Carney	3	4
3	(United Kingdom) Julie Salmon	6	6

=== Seventh qualifier ===
First round
8	(New Zealand) Belinda Cordwell	6	6
(United States) Sylvia Schenck	1	2
(Australia) Justine Brown	2	3
(Netherlands) Carin Bakkum	6	6

Qualifying competition
8	(New Zealand) Belinda Cordwell	6	6
(Netherlands) Carin Bakkum	2	2

=== Eighth qualifier ===
First round
(United States) Pamela Jung	2	7^{7}	4
WC	(Australia) Kate McDonald	6	6^{4}	6
(United States) Paula Smith	4	4
2	(Netherlands) Marianne van der Torre	6	6

Qualifying competition
WC	(Australia) Kate McDonald	1	3
2	(Netherlands) Marianne van der Torre	6	6
