= Mike Smith (tennis) =

American tennis player

- Full name: Michael Smith Jr.
- Country (sports): United States
- Born: October 16, 1962 (age 62); Little Rock, Arkansas
- Height: 6 ft 0 in (183 cm)

Singles
- Highest ranking: No. 522 (May 19, 1986)

Grand Slam singles results
- Australian Open: Q1 (1987)

Doubles
- Career record: 0–3
- Highest ranking: No. 209 (April 27, 1987)

Grand Slam doubles results
- Australian Open: 1R (1987)

Michael Smith Jr. (born October 16, 1962) is an American former professional tennis player.

Smith grew up in Little Rock and attended Duke University, where he played varsity tennis while studying for an economics degree. After graduating in 1985 he competed in professional tennis, with his best performances coming in doubles. He had a highest doubles ranking of 209 and featured in the 1987 Australian Open men's doubles main draw.

== ATP Challenger finals ==
=== Doubles: 1 (0–1) ===
| No. | Result | Date | Tournament | Surface | Partner | Opponents | Score |
|---|---|---|---|---|---|---|---|
| Loss | 1. | Dec 1986 | Ikeja, Nigeria | Clay | (Senegal) Yahiya Doumbia | (Nigeria) Tony Mmoh (Nigeria) Nduka Odizor | 4–6, 6–7 |
