= Des Tyson =

Australian tennis player

- Full name: Desmond Tyson
- Country (sports): Australia
- Born: 26 September 1965 (age 61) Griffith, Australia
- Plays: Right-handed
- Prize money: $49,090

Singles
- Career record: 1–6
- Career titles: 0
- Highest ranking: No. 218 (27 July 1987)

Grand Slam singles results
- Australian Open: 1R (1987)
- Wimbledon: 1R (1987)

Doubles
- Career record: 22–36
- Career titles: 0
- Highest ranking: No. 71 (26 January 1987)

Grand Slam doubles results
- Australian Open: QF (1985, 1987)
- French Open: 1R (1987)
- Wimbledon: 2R (1986)
- US Open: 1R (1986)

Grand Slam mixed doubles results
- Australian Open: QF (1987)
- French Open: 3R (1987)
- Wimbledon: 2R (1987)

Desmond Tyson (born 26 September 1965) is a former professional tennis player from Australia.

== Biography ==
A right-handed player, Tyson comes from the New South Wales town of Griffith. He partnered with Jamie Harty to win the boys' doubles title at the 1983 Australian Open. This was the only Grand Slam junior doubles title that the pairing of Mark Kratzmann and Simon Youl didn't win in 1983.

Tyson played mainly in doubles events on the professional tour. His best result in singles at Grand Prix level was an upset win over then world number 31 and top seed Paolo Canè at Saint-Vincent in 1986. This was the only time he progressed past the first round of a Grand Prix tournament, but he also had two main draw appearances in Grand Slams, at both the Australian Open and Wimbledon Championships in 1987. In doubles he was much more successful, making it to 71 in the world. He twice made the men's doubles quarter-finals at the Australian Open, in 1985 and 1987, both times with Antony Emerson. At the 1987 Australian Open he also reached the mixed doubles quarter-finals, with Janine Tremelling. He won three Challenger titles in doubles and made four Grand Prix semi-finals. In one of those Grand Prix tournaments, he and partner Tim Siegel beat highly ranked pair Darren Cahill and John Fitzgerald. He retired from professional tennis in 1990.

During the 1990s he worked as a tennis coach in Hong Kong for the territory's Sports Institute. He made a comeback to the tour in 1996, by which time he was eligible to represent Hong Kong due to long term residency and was talked about as a possible Davis Cup selection. His return to tennis consisted of a series of Asian satellite tournaments and he won both the singles and doubles titles at an event in Tianjin. He took part in the qualifying draw for the men's singles at the 1997 Australian Open.

From 2003 to 2010 he was a national coach for the Chinese Tennis Association. Since then he has returned to Australia and now works for Tennis Australia. He coaches Jordan Thompson, who under Tyson broke into the top 100 and has played Davis Cup for Australia.

In 2016 Tyson received a coaching excellence award for the high performance category at the Australian Tennis Awards.

== Challenger titles ==
=== Doubles: (3) ===
No.	Year	Tournament	Surface	Partner	Opponents	Score
1.	1986	Travemünde, West Germany	Clay	(United States) Jim Pugh	(South Africa) Henri de Wet (Spain) Jesús Colás	4–6, 6–3, 6–4
2.	1987	Tampere, Finland	Clay	(Sweden) David Engel	(Sweden) Christer Allgårdh (Greece) George Kalovelonis	6–3, 3–6, 6–3
3.	1989	Brisbane, Australia	Hard	(Australia) Brett Custer	(Australia) Shane Barr (United States) Ted Scherman	7–6, 6–4
