= Dominik Utzinger =

Swiss tennis player

- Full name: Dominik Guido Utzinger
- Country (sports): Switzerland
- Born: 12 April 1963 (age 61); Basel, Switzerland
- Plays: Right-handed

Singles
- Career record: 0-1
- Career titles: 0
- Highest ranking: No. 288 (4 March 1985)

Doubles
- Career record: 3-14
- Career titles: 0
- Highest ranking: No. 155 (26 January 1987)

Grand Slam doubles results
- Australian Open: 3R (1987)

Grand Slam mixed doubles results
- Australian Open: SF (1987)

Dominik Guido Utzinger (born 12 April 1963) is a former professional tennis player from Switzerland.

== Biography ==
Utzinger is from Basel originally and as a junior competed at the Wimbledon Championships.

He represented the Switzerland Davis Cup team in a tie against Tunisia in Tunis in 1985. The Swiss players didn't drop a singles set in a 5–0 sweep, with Utzinger winning both of his singles matches as well as the doubles, in which he partnered Markus Günthardt.

On the Grand Prix circuit he played mostly in the doubles, with his only singles appearance the 1985 Japan Open in Tokyo, a first round loss to Harald Rittersbacher. He was a doubles quarter-finalist with Alex Antonitsch in Toulouse in 1985.

At the 1985 Australian Open he participated in the men's doubles with Tony Mmoh.

He was runner-up at two Challenger tournaments, both in doubles, at Curitiba in 1985 and Parioli in 1986.

His most notable performance came at the 1987 Australian Open, where he and countrywoman Christiane Jolissaint were semi-finalists in the mixed doubles. He also featured in the men's doubles draw partnering Christian Saceanu and the pair reached the round of 16, before they lost to eventual champions Stefan Edberg and Anders Järryd.

While coaching in Basel, Utzinger was an early mentor of Roger Federer.

In 2006 he became coach of Sri Lanka's Davis Cup team.

He lives in Bangkok, Thailand and has been head coach of the local Asian Tennis Academy.

== See also ==
- List of Switzerland Davis Cup team representatives
