= Richard Fricker =

Australian tennis player

- Country (sports): Australia
- Born: 14 December 1965 (age 59)
- Plays: Right-handed

Singles
- Highest ranking: No. 402 (6 July 1987)

Grand Slam singles results
- Australian Open: Q3 (1987)
- Wimbledon: Q1 (1988)

Doubles
- Career record: 2–4
- Highest ranking: No. 186 (20 July 1987)

Grand Slam doubles results
- Australian Open: 1R (1987, 1988)
- Wimbledon: Q1 (1988)

Richard Fricker (born 14 December 1965) is an Australian former professional tennis player.

A right-handed player from Adelaide, Fricker competed on the professional tour in the 1980s.

His best performance in singles at the Australian Open came in 1987 when he made the third round of the qualifiers and he appeared once in the qualifying draw for Wimbledon, in 1988.

Fricker, who reached the world's top 200 in doubles, was a semi-finalist in the doubles at the 1987 Bordeaux Open, partnering Gavin Pfitzner. He twice featured in the Australian Open doubles main draw, in 1987 and 1988, both times partnering Pfitzner.
