= Steve Wood (tennis) =

- Country (sports): Australia
- Born: 25 June 1962 (age 62); Melbourne, Australia

Singles
- Career record: 0–1
- Highest ranking: No. 495 (23 June 1986)

Grand Slam singles results
- Australian Open: 2R (1987)
- Wimbledon: Q1 (1985, 1986)

Steve Wood (born 25 June 1962) is an Australian business executive former professional tennis player.

Born in Melbourne, Wood played NCAA Division I tennis in the United States while studying business at Louisiana State University, before embarking on a brief professional tennis career. He qualified for the 1987 Australian Open and in his second round match against Paul Annacone held a two set lead, but was beaten in five sets.

Wood was CEO of Tennis Australia from 2005 to 2013.
