= Mike Baroch =

Australian tennis player

- Full name: Michael Baroch
- Country (sports): Australia
- Born: 1 June 1966 (age 59)
- Plays: Right-handed
- Prize money: $4,126

Singles
- Career record: 0–1
- Career titles: 0; 0 Challenger, 0 Futures
- Highest ranking: No. 434 (3 March 1986)

Grand Slam singles results
- Australian Open: 1R (1987)
- Wimbledon: Q2 (1984, 1986)

Doubles
- Career record: 0–2
- Career titles: 0; 0 Challenger, 0 Futures
- Highest ranking: No. 293 (28 July 1986)

Grand Slam doubles results
- Wimbledon: Q2 (1985)
- Last updated on: 17 June 2022.

Michael Baroch (born 1 June 1966) is an Australian former professional tennis player. He won the boys' doubles title at the 1984 Australian Open, with Mark Kratzmann as his partner.

Baroch, who reached a career high singles ranking of 434, qualified for the main draw of the 1987 Australian Open and lost in the first round to Mark Woodforde. He also featured in qualifying draws for the Wimbledon Championships.

== Junior Grand Slam finals ==
=== Doubles: 1 (1 title) ===
| Result | Year | Tournament | Surface | Partnet | Opponents | Score |
|---|---|---|---|---|---|---|
| Win | 1984 | Australian Open | Hard | (Australia) Mark Kratzmann | (Australia) Brett Custer (Australia) David Macpherson | 6–1, 4–6, [9–11] |
