= Antony Emerson =

Australian tennis player (1963–2016)

- Full name: Antony Emerson
- Country (sports): Australia
- Born: 29 March 1963 Brisbane, Queensland
- Died: 23 January 2016 (aged 52) Newport Beach, California
- Plays: Right-handed

Singles
- Career record: 0–3
- Career titles: 0
- Highest ranking: No. 285 (23 March 1987)

Doubles
- Career record: 12–23
- Career titles: 0
- Highest ranking: No. 112 (26 January 1987)

Grand Slam doubles results
- Australian Open: QF (1985, 1987)
- French Open: 1R (1986)

Antony Emerson (29 March 1963 – 23 January 2016) was a professional tennis player from Australia. He was the son of Roy Emerson.

== Biography ==
=== Early years ===
Emerson was born in Brisbane on 29 March 1963, to Joy and Roy Emerson. He and his father, who was the first man to win 12 Grand Slam singles titles, won the US Hard Court Father and Son tournament in 1978. During his junior career he also had a win over Mats Wilander.

Growing up in Newport Beach, Emerson attended Corona del Mar High School, at the same time as family friend Lars Ulrich.

He was a member of the varsity tennis team at the University of Southern California before turning professional and earned All-American selection in 1984.

=== Professional career ===
Coached by his father, Emerson competed on the professional tour in the 1980s. He made most of his appearances as a doubles player and won a Challenger title with Mark Woodforde in Dortmund in 1985.

On two occasions he made the men's doubles quarter-finals at the Australian Open, in 1985 and 1987. He partnered Des Tyson in both. His other Grand Slam appearances were at the 1986 French Open with Harald Rittersbacher and 1988 Australian Open with Ramesh Krishnan.

=== Later life ===
Emerson worked as a tennis professional in Miami for many years. Every year since 1983 he also helped run the Roy Emerson Tennis Weeks, a popular six week tennis camp held in the Swiss town of Gstaad.

Diagnosed with brain and liver cancer in 2015, Emerson's condition worsened rapidly and his father skipped the 2016 Australian Open where he was due to be honoured.

On 23 January 2016, Emerson died at the age of 52.

== Challenger titles ==
=== Doubles: (1) ===
No.	Year	Tournament	Surface	Partner	Opponents	Score
1.	1985	Dortmund, West Germany	Clay	(Australia) Mark Woodforde	(Australia) Russell Barlow (United States) Mark Buckley	7–6, 6–2
