= Michaela Pazderová =

Czech tennis player

- Country (sports): Czechoslovakia
- Born: 21 January 1963 (age 62)
- Height: 5 ft 2 in (157 cm)
- Prize money: $28,599

Singles
- Career record: 26–50
- Highest ranking: No. 211 (21 Dec 1986)

Grand Slam singles results
- Australian Open: 1R (1987)
- French Open: 3R (1982)
- US Open: 1R (1982)

Doubles
- Career record: 15–27
- Highest ranking: No. 175 (21 Dec 1986)

Grand Slam doubles results
- US Open: 1R (1982)

Michaela Pazderová (born 21 January 1963) is a Czech former professional tennis player.

Pazderová made the third round of the singles at the 1982 French Open. Entering the main draw as a qualifier, she had wins over Sophie Amiach and Renáta Tomanová, before her run was ended by eighth seed Anne Smith.
