= Gavin Pfitzner =

Australian tennis player

- Full name: Gavin Pfitzner
- Country (sports): Australia
- Born: 1 September 1966 (age 58)
- Prize money: $22,393

Singles
- Highest ranking: No. 417 (26 September 1988)

Doubles
- Career record: 3-11
- Highest ranking: No. 195 (13 October 1986)

Grand Slam doubles results
- Australian Open: 1R (1987, 1988, 1989)
- Wimbledon: 1R (1990)

Grand Slam mixed doubles results
- Wimbledon: 1R (1989)

Gavin Pfitzner (born 1 September 1966) is a former professional tennis player from Australia.

== Biography ==
Pfitzner, who comes from South Australia, is the son of a tennis player. His father, Trevor, played against Marty Mulligan at the 1959 Australian Championships. He was coached during his career by one of his father's contemporaries Barry Phillips-Moore.

Competing on the professional tour in the 1980s, Pfitzner made all of his Grand Prix main draw appearances in doubles, which included making the semi-finals of the 1987 Bordeaux Open with Richard Fricker. He played in the main draws of doubles events at both the Australian Open and Wimbledon on multiple occasions between 1987 and 1990.

He now coaches tennis at the Modbury Tennis Club in Adelaide.

== Challenger titles ==
=== Doubles: (1) ===
No.	Year	Tournament	Surface	Partner	Opponents	Score
1.	1988	Dijon, France	Carpet	(United States) Howard Endelman	(Romania) Mihnea-Ion Nastase (Mexico) Fernando Pérez Pascal	7–6, 6–7, 6–4
