= Zina Garrison =

American tennis player

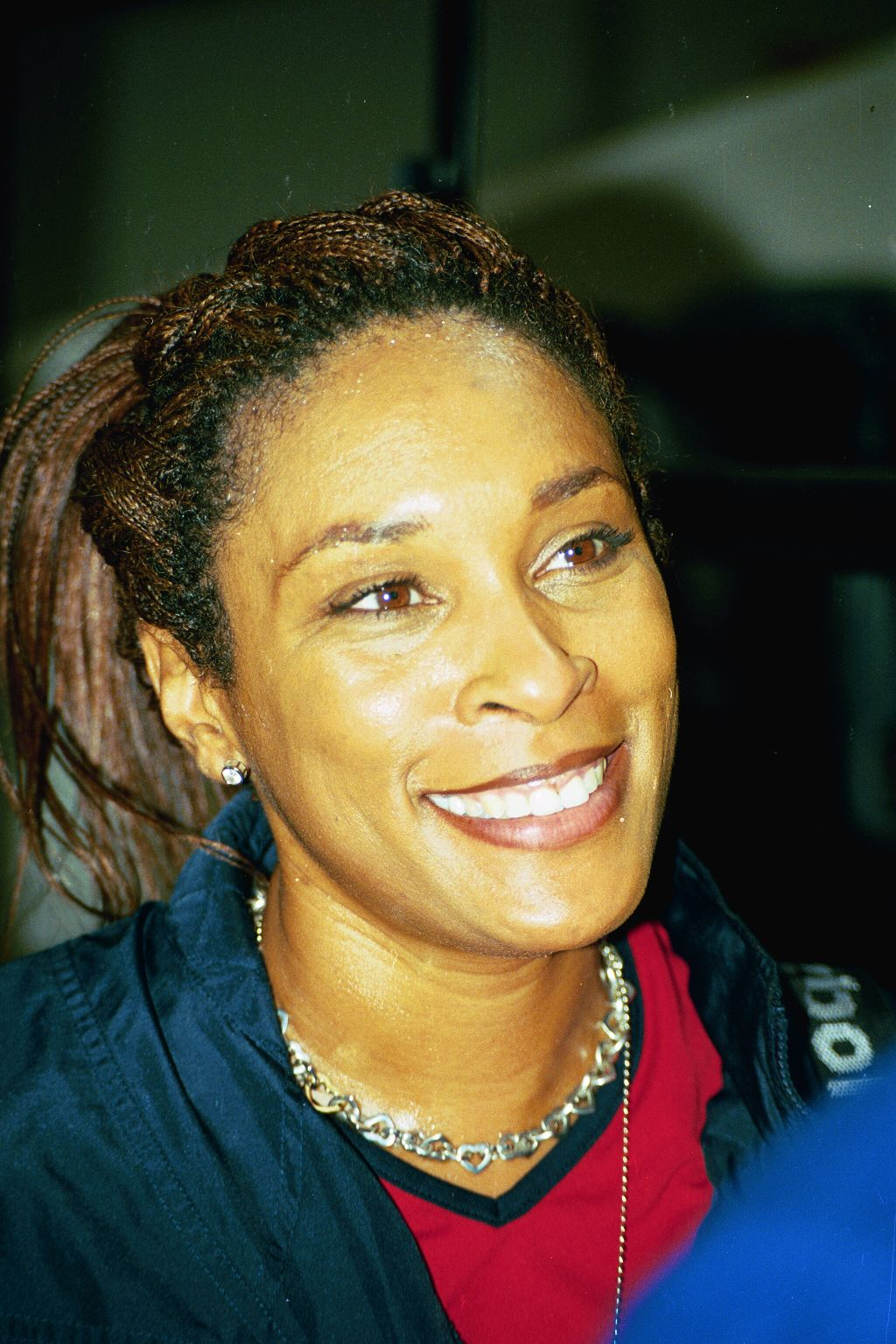
- Garrison in 2001
- Country (sports): United States
- Residence: Houston, Texas, U.S.
- Born: November 16, 1963 (age 62) Houston, Texas, U.S.
- Height: 1.64 m (5 ft 5 in)
- Turned pro: 1982
- Retired: 1997
- Plays: Right-handed (one handed-backhand)
- Prize money: $4,590,816

Singles
- Career record: 587–270
- Career titles: 14
- Highest ranking: No. 4 (November 20, 1989)

Grand Slam singles results
- Australian Open: SF (1983)
- French Open: QF (1982)
- Wimbledon: F (1990)
- US Open: SF (1988, 1989)

Other tournaments
- Olympic Games: SF (1988)

Doubles
- Career record: 436–231
- Career titles: 20
- Highest ranking: No. 5 (May 23, 1988)

Grand Slam doubles results
- Australian Open: F (1987, 1992)
- French Open: QF (1988, 1989, 1991, 1995)
- Wimbledon: SF (1988, 1990, 1991, 1993)
- US Open: SF (1985, 1991)

Other doubles tournaments
- Olympic Games: W (1988)

Mixed doubles
- Career titles: 3

Grand Slam mixed doubles results
- Australian Open: W (1987)
- French Open: SF (1989)
- Wimbledon: W (1988, 1990)
- US Open: SF (1987)

Team competitions
- Fed Cup: W (1989, 1990)
- Hopman Cup: F (1991)
Medal record
Women's tennis
Representing United States
Olympic Games
Gold medal – first place	1988 Seoul	Women's doubles
Bronze medal – third place	1988 Seoul	Women's singles

Zina Lynna Garrison (born November 16, 1963) is an American former professional tennis player. Garrison was the runner-up in singles at the 1990 Wimbledon Championships, a three-time major mixed doubles champion, and an Olympic gold and bronze medalist from the women's doubles and singles events, respectively, at the 1988 Seoul Olympics. She reached a career-high singles ranking of world No. 4, on 20 November 1989.

== Career ==
The youngest of seven children, Garrison started playing tennis at the age of 10 and entered her first tournament at the age of 12. At 14, she won the national girls' 18s title. In 1981, she won both the Wimbledon and US Open junior titles and was ranked the world No. 1 junior player. Garrison graduated from Sterling High School in Houston, Texas in 1982.

Garrison began suffering from the eating disorder bulimia when she was 19, following the death of her mother. "I had never been comfortable with my looks and felt I had lost the only person who loved me unconditionally", Garrison told the Observer Sport Monthly in 2006. "The pressure of being labeled 'the next Althea Gibson' only made things worse. I felt I was never going to be allowed to grow into just becoming me."

Garrison turned professional in 1982, and skipped her graduation at Ross Sterling High School to compete in the French Open, her first tournament as a professional, where she reached the quarterfinals. She was awarded the WTA Newcomer of the Year in 1982.

Despite battling bulimia during her first few years on the tour, Garrison enjoyed notable success on-court. She reached the Australian Open semifinals in 1983, her first full year on the tour, and finished the year ranked world No. 10. She won her first top-level singles titles in 1984 at the European Indoor Championships in Zürich. In 1985, Garrison beat world no. 3 Hana Mandlíková and world no. 2 Chris Evert on her way to winning the Amelia Island Championships. She was also a Wimbledon semifinalist in 1985, and in 1986, she won her first tour doubles at the Canadian Open (partnering Gabriela Sabatini).

At the Australian Open in 1987, Garrison won the mixed doubles (partnering Sherwood Stewart) and finished runner-up in the women's doubles (partnering Lori McNeil). A year later, Garrison and Stewart captured the mixed doubles title at Wimbledon.

At the 1988 Olympic Games in Seoul, Garrison teamed with Pam Shriver to win the women's doubles gold medal for the United States, defeating Jana Novotná and Helena Suková of Czechoslovakia in the final. Garrison defeated Shriver in the quarterfinals of the singles event, where she won a bronze medal. At the US Open, she defeated defending champion Navratilova for the first time in her career, advancing to the semifinals, where she lost to Sabatini.

In 1989, Garrison defeated Chris Evert 7–6, 6–2 in the quarterfinals of the US Open in Evert's final tournament. Garrison lost to Navratilova in the semifinals. She finished 1989 ranked at career-high No. 4 in singles.

The highlight of Garrison's career came in 1990 at Wimbledon, as she defeated Samantha Smith, Cecilia Dahlman, Andrea Leand, Helena Suková, then French Open champion Monica Seles in the quarterfinals 3–6, 6–3, 9–7, and defending Wimbledon champion and world No. 1, Steffi Graf, in the semifinals 6–3, 3–6, 6–4 to reach her only Grand Slam singles final, becoming the first African-American woman to do so since Gibson. Moreover, it ended Graf's record 13-time streak of Grand Slam finals. Then, she lost to Navratilova 4–6, 1–6, who thus won her record ninth women's singles title at Wimbledon. Garrison claimed her third mixed-doubles title at Wimbledon that year (partnering Rick Leach).

In 1992, Garrison finished runner-up in the Australian Open women's doubles (partnering Mary Joe Fernández).

At Wimbledon in 1994, Garrison beat world No. 2 Arantxa Sánchez Vicario on the way to her 15th and final Grand Slam quarterfinal appearance.

Garrison retired from professional tennis in 1996. From 1982 to 1995, she remained uninterrupted in the world's top 25. During her career, she won 14 top-level singles titles and 20 doubles titles.

== Personal life and post-tennis career ==
Garrison married Willard Jackson in September 1989; however, the marriage ended in divorce in 1997.

Since retiring from the tour, Garrison has worked as a television commentator and maintained active roles in the community and in tennis. She founded the Zina Garrison Foundation for the Homeless in 1988, and the Zina Garrison All-Court Tennis Program, which supports inner-city tennis in Houston, in 1992. She has also served as a member of the United States President's Council on Physical Fitness and Sports. She is a member of Alpha Kappa Alpha sorority.

Garrison has maintained a presence on the professional tennis scene, and was the captain for the U.S. Federation Cup (later Fed Cup) team. Garrison also led the U.S. women's team at the 2008 Beijing Games tennis event where team members Venus and Serena Williams won a gold medal in doubles.

After "piling on weight" in her 40s, Garrison participated in season 16 of the reality TV competition The Biggest Loser, titled The Biggest Loser: Glory Days, which premiered September 11, 2014 on NBC. Despite losing 8 lbs., she was the first person eliminated from the program.

== Playing style ==
Garrison played an attacking style. It was common for her to slice her backhand and attack the net (a chip-and-charge tactic). Garrison had excellent volleys and overheads. She was able to rally when she wanted to but her main game plan was to get to the net so she could finish with the volley.

== Major finals ==
=== Grand Slam tournaments ===
==== Singles: 1 (runner–up) ====
Result	Year	Championship	Surface	Opponent	Score
Loss	1990	Wimbledon	Grass	(United States) Martina Navratilova	6–4, 6–1

==== Doubles: 2 (2 runner-ups) ====
Result	Year	Championship	Surface	Partner	Opponents	Score
Loss	1987	Australian Open	Grass	(United States) Lori McNeil	(United States) Martina Navratilova (United States) Pam Shriver	6–1, 6–0
Loss	1992	Australian Open	Hard	(United States) Mary Joe Fernández	(Spain) Arantxa Sánchez Vicario (Czechoslovakia) Helena Suková	6–4, 7–6^{(7–3)}

==== Mixed doubles: 6 (3 titles, 3 runner-ups) ====
Result	Year	Championship	Surface	Partner	Opponents	Score
Win	1987	Australian Open	Grass	(United States) Sherwood Stewart	(United Kingdom) Anne Hobbs (United Kingdom) Andrew Castle	3–6, 7–6^{(7–5)}, 6–3
Win	1988	Wimbledon	Grass	(United States) Sherwood Stewart	(United States) Gretchen Magers (United States) Kelly Jones	6–1, 7–6^{(7–3)}
Loss	1989	Australian Open	Hard	(United States) Sherwood Stewart	(Czechoslovakia) Jana Novotná (United States) Jim Pugh	6–3, 6–4
Loss	1990	Australian Open	Hard	(United States) Jim Pugh	(Soviet Union) Natasha Zvereva (United Kingdom) Andrew Castle	4–6, 6–2, 6–3
Win	1990	Wimbledon (2)	Grass	(United States) Rick Leach	(Australia) Elizabeth Smylie (Australia) John Fitzgerald	7–5, 6–2
Loss	1993	Australian Open	Hard	(United States) Rick Leach	(Spain) Arantxa Sánchez Vicario (Australia) Todd Woodbridge	7–5, 6–4

=== Olympics ===
==== Singles: 1 (bronze medal) ====
Result	Year	Location	Surface	Opponent	Score
Bronze	1988	Seoul	Hard	Tied	DNP

Garrison lost in the semifinals to Steffi Graf 2–6, 0–6. In 1988, there was no bronze medal play-off match, both beaten semifinal players received bronze medals.

==== Doubles: 1 (gold medal) ====
Result	Year	Location	Surface	Partner	Opponents	Score
Gold	1988	Seoul	Hard	(United States) Pam Shriver	(Czechoslovakia) Jana Novotná (Czechoslovakia) Helena Suková	4–6, 6–2, 10–8

== WTA career finals ==
=== Singles: 36 (14–22) ===
Winner — Legend Grand Slam tournaments (0–1) WTA Tour Championships (0–0) Tier I (0–0) Tier II (0–8) Tier III (5–2) Tier IV (3–2) Tier V (0–2) Virginia Slims (6–7)	Finals by surface Hard (3–6) Grass (4–4) Clay (1–3) Carpet (6–9)

Result	W/L	Date	Tournament	Surface	Opponent	Score
Loss	1.	Aug 1983	Indianapolis	Clay	(Hungary) Andrea Temesvári	2–6, 2–6
Loss	2.	Jan 1984	Washington	Carpet (i)	(Czechoslovakia) Hana Mandlíková	1–6, 1–6
Loss	3.	Sep 1984	New Orleans	Carpet (i)	(United States) Martina Navratilova	4–6, 3–6
Win	1.	Oct 1984	Zürich	Carpet (i)	(West Germany) Claudia Kohde-Kilsch	6–1, 0–6, 6–2
Loss	4.	Jan 1985	Denver	Carpet (i)	(United States) Peanut Louie	4–6, 6–4, 4–6
Win	2.	Apr 1985	Amelia Island	Clay	(United States) Chris Evert-Lloyd	6–4, 6–3
Loss	5.	Jul 1985	Indianapolis	Clay	(Hungary) Andrea Temesvári	6–7^{(0–7)}, 3–6
Win	3.	Oct 1985	Zürich	Carpet (i)	(Czechoslovakia) Hana Mandlíková	6–1, 6–3
Loss	6.	Sep 1986	Tampa	Hard	(United States) Lori McNeil	6–2, 5–7, 2–6
Win	4.	Oct 1986	Indianapolis	Hard (i)	(United States) Melissa Gurney	6–3, 6–3
Win	5.	Jan 1987	Sydney	Grass	(United States) Pam Shriver	6–2, 6–4
Win	6.	Feb 1987	San Francisco	Carpet (i)	(West Germany) Sylvia Hanika	7–5, 4–6, 6–3
Loss	7.	Aug 1987	Toronto	Hard	(United States) Pam Shriver	4–6, 1–6
Loss	8.	Oct 1988	Indianapolis	Hard (i)	(Bulgaria) Katerina Maleeva	3–6, 6–2, 2–6
Loss	9.	Feb 1989	Washington	Carpet (i)	(West Germany) Steffi Graf	1–6, 5–7
Win	7.	Feb 1989	Oakland	Carpet (i)	(Soviet Union) Larisa Savchenko	6–1, 6–1
Loss	10.	Jun 1989	Birmingham	Grass	(United States) Martina Navratilova	6–7^{(5–7)}, 3–6
Win	8.	Jul 1989	Newport	Grass	(United States) Pam Shriver	6–0, 6–1
Loss	11.	Jul 1989	San Diego	Hard	(West Germany) Steffi Graf	4–6, 5–7
Loss	12.	Oct 1989	Worcester	Carpet (i)	(United States) Martina Navratilova	2–6, 3–6
Win	9.	Nov 1989	Chicago	Carpet (i)	(Soviet Union) Larisa Savchenko	6–3, 2–6, 6–4
Loss	13.	Feb 1990	Washington	Carpet (i)	(United States) Martina Navratilova	1–6, 0–6
Win	10.	Jun 1990	Birmingham	Grass	(Czechoslovakia) Helena Suková	6–4, 6–1
Loss	14.	Jun 1990	Wimbledon	Grass	(United States) Martina Navratilova	4–6, 1–6
Loss	15.	Oct 1990	Dorado	Hard	(United States) Jennifer Capriati	7–5, 4–6, 2–6
Loss	16.	Feb 1991	Chicago	Carpet (i)	(United States) Martina Navratilova	1–6, 2–6
Loss	17.	Oct 1991	Brighton	Carpet (i)	(Germany) Steffi Graf	7–5, 4–6, 1–6
Win	11.	Feb 1992	Oklahoma City	Hard (i)	(United States) Lori McNeil	7–5, 3–6, 7–6^{(12–10)}
Loss	18.	Apr, 1992	Houston	Clay	(Socialist Federal Republic of Yugoslavia) Monica Seles	1–6, 1–6
Win	12.	Feb 1993	Oklahoma City	Hard (i)	(United States) Patty Fendick	6–2, 6–2
Loss	19.	Jun 1993	Birmingham	Grass	(United States) Lori McNeil	4–6, 6–2, 3–6
Loss	20.	Jul 1993	Stratton Mountain	Hard	(Spain) Conchita Martínez	3–6, 2–6
Win	13.	Oct 1993	Budapest	Carpet (i)	(Belgium) Sabine Appelmans	7–5, 6–2
Loss	21.	Nov 1993	Oakland	Carpet (i)	(United States) Martina Navratilova	2–6, 6–7^{(1–7)}
Loss	22.	Jun 1994	Birmingham	Grass	(United States) Lori McNeil	2–6, 2–6
Win	14.	Jun 1995	Birmingham	Grass	(United States) Lori McNeil	6–3, 6–3

=== Doubles: 45 (19–26) ===
Winner — Legend Grand Slam tournaments (0–2) WTA Tour Championships (0–0) Tier I (2–2) Tier II (6–11) Tier III (6–2) Tier IV (0–0) Tier V (0–1) Virginia Slims (5–8)	Finals by surface Hard (7–7) Grass (2–3) Clay (3–5) Carpet (7–11)

Result	No.	Date	Tournament	Surface	Partner	Opponents	Score
Win	1.	Aug 1986	Montreal	Hard	(Argentina) Gabriela Sabatini	(United States) Pam Shriver (Czechoslovakia) Helena Suková	7–6^{(7–2)}, 5–7, 6–4
Loss	1.	Oct 1986	Filderstadt	Carpet (i)	(Argentina) Gabriela Sabatini	(United States) Martina Navratilova (United States) Pam Shriver	6–7^{(5–7)}, 4–6
Win	2.	Oct 1986	Indianapolis	Hard (i)	(United States) Lori McNeil	(United States) Candy Reynolds (United States) Anne Smith	4–5 ret.
Loss	2.	Jan 1987	Australian Open	Grass	(United States) Lori McNeil	(United States) Martina Navratilova (United States) Pam Shriver	1–6, 0–6
Loss	3.	Feb 1987	San Francisco	Carpet (i)	(Argentina) Gabriela Sabatini	(Czechoslovakia) Hana Mandlíková (Australia) Wendy Turnbull	4–6, 6–7^{(4–7)}
Loss	4.	Mar, 1987	Washington	Carpet (i)	(United States) Lori McNeil	(United States) Elise Burgin (United States) Pam Shriver	1–6, 6–3, 4–6
Loss	5.	Apr 1987	Hilton Head Island	Clay	(United States) Lori McNeil	(Argentina) Mercedes Paz (West Germany) Eva Pfaff	6–7^{(6–8)}, 5–7
Loss	6.	Apr 1987	Houston	Clay	(United States) Lori McNeil	(United States) Kathy Jordan (United States) Martina Navratilova	2–6, 4–6
Loss	7.	Aug 1987	Los Angeles	Hard	(United States) Lori McNeil	(United States) Martina Navratilova (United States) Pam Shriver	3–6, 4–6
Win	3.	Aug 1987	Toronto	Hard	(United States) Lori McNeil	(West Germany) Claudia Kohde-Kilsch (Czechoslovakia) Helena Suková	6–1, 6–2
Win	4.	Sep 1987	New Orleans	Carpet (i)	(United States) Lori McNeil	(United States) Peanut Louie Harper (United States) Heather Ludloff	6–3, 6–4
Loss	8.	Oct 1987	Filderstadt	Carpet (i)	(United States) Lori McNeil	(United States) Martina Navratilova (United States) Pam Shriver	1–6, 2–6
Loss	9.	Nov 1987	Chicago	Carpet (i)	(United States) Lori McNeil	(West Germany) Claudia Kohde-Kilsch (Czechoslovakia) Helena Suková	4–6, 3–6
Loss	10.	Feb 1988	Dallas	Carpet (i)	(United States) Gigi Fernández	(United States) Lori McNeil (West Germany) Eva Pfaff	6–2, 4–6, 5–7
Win	5.	Mar 1988	Boca Raton	Hard	(United States) Katrina Adams	(West Germany) Claudia Kohde-Kilsch (Czechoslovakia) Helena Suková	4–6, 5–7, 6–4
Loss	11.	Mar 1988	Key Biscayne	Hard	(United States) Gigi Fernández	(West Germany) Steffi Graf (Argentina) Gabriela Sabatini	6–7^{(3–7)}, 3–6
Win	6.	Apr 1988	Amelia Island	Clay	(West Germany) Eva Pfaff	(United States) Katrina Adams (United States) Penny Barg	4–6, 6–2, 7–6^{(7–5)}
Win	7.	Apr 1988	Houston	Clay	(United States) Katrina Adams	(United States) Lori McNeil (United States) Martina Navratilova	6–7^{(4–7)}, 6–2, 6–4
Loss	12.	Aug 1988	Montreal	Hard	(United States) Pam Shriver	(Czechoslovakia) Jana Novotná (Czechoslovakia) Helena Suková	6–7^{(2–7)}, 6–7^{(6–8)}
Loss	13.	Oct 1988	Indianapolis	Hard (i)	(United States) Katrina Adams	(Soviet Union) Larisa Savchenko (Soviet Union) Natalia Zvereva	2–6, 1–6
Win	8.	Nov 1988	Tokyo	Carpet (i)	(United States) Katrina Adams	(United States) Gigi Fernández (United States) Robin White	7–5, 7–5
Win	9.	Jan 1989	Tokyo	Carpet (i)	(United States) Katrina Adams	(United States) Mary Joe Fernández (West Germany) Claudia Kohde-Kilsch	6–3, 6–3, 7–6^{(7–5)}
Win	10.	Apr 1989	Houston	Clay	(United States) Katrina Adams	(United States) Gigi Fernández (United States) Lori McNeil	6–3, 6–4
Win	11.	Jun 1989	Eastbourne	Grass	(United States) Katrina Adams	(Czechoslovakia) Jana Novotná (Czechoslovakia) Helena Suková	6–3, ret.
Win	12.	Feb 1990	Washington	Carpet (i)	(United States) Martina Navratilova	(United States) Ann Henricksson (South Africa) Dinky van Rensburg	6–0, 6–3
Loss	14.	Jun 1990	Eastbourne	Grass	(United States) Patty Fendick	(Soviet Union) Larisa Savchenko-Neiland (Soviet Union) Natalia Zvereva	4–6, 3–6
Win	13.	Aug 1990	San Diego	Hard	(United States) Patty Fendick	(United States) Elise Burgin (South Africa) Rosalyn Fairbank	6–4, 7–6^{(7–5)}
Win	14.	Oct 1990	Filderstadt	Carpet (i)	(United States) Mary Joe Fernández	(Argentina) Mercedes Paz (Spain) Arantxa Sánchez Vicario	7–5, 6–3
Win	15.	Mar 1991	Key Biscayne	Hard	(United States) Mary Joe Fernández	(United States) Gigi Fernández (Czechoslovakia) Jana Novotná	7–5, 6–2
Loss	15.	Oct 1991	Zürich	Carpet (i)	(United States) Lori McNeil	(Czechoslovakia) Jana Novotná (Czechoslovakia) Andrea Strnadová	4–6, 3–6
Loss	16.	Oct 1991	Brighton	Carpet (i)	(United States) Lori McNeil	(United States) Pam Shriver (Soviet Union) Natasha Zvereva	1–6, 2–6
Loss	17.	Nov 1991	Philadelphia	Carpet (i)	(United States) Mary Joe Fernández	(Czechoslovakia) Jana Novotná (Soviet Union) Larisa Savchenko-Neiland	2–6, 4–6
Loss	18.	Jan 1992	Sydney	Hard	(United States) Mary Joe Fernández	(Spain) Arantxa Sánchez Vicario (Czechoslovakia) Helena Suková	6–7^{(4–7)}, 7–6^{(7–4)}, 2–6
Loss	19.	Jan 1992	Australian Open	Hard	(United States) Mary Joe Fernández	(Spain) Arantxa Sánchez Vicario (Czechoslovakia) Helena Suková	4–6, 6–7^{(3–7)}
Loss	20.	Feb 1992	Chicago	Carpet (i)	(United States) Katrina Adams	(United States) Martina Navratilova (United States) Pam Shriver	4–6, 6–7^{(7–9)}
Loss	21.	Apr 1992	Amelia Island	Clay	(Czechoslovakia) Jana Novotná	(Spain) Arantxa Sánchez Vicario (Commonwealth of Independent States) Natasha Zvereva	1–6, 0–6
Loss	22.	Jun 1992	Eastbourne	Grass	(United States) Mary Joe Fernández	(Czechoslovakia) Jana Novotná (Latvia) Larisa Savchenko-Neiland	0–6, 3–6
Loss	23.	Aug 1992	Los Angeles	Hard	(United States) Pam Shriver	(Spain) Arantxa Sánchez Vicario (Czechoslovakia) Helena Suková	4–6, 2–6
Win	16.	Feb 1993	Chicago	Carpet (i)	(United States) Katrina Adams	(United States) Amy Frazier (United States) Kimberly Po	7–6^{(7–3)}, 6–3
Win	17.	Feb 1993	Oklahoma City	Hard (i)	(United States) Patty Fendick	(United States) Katrina Adams (Netherlands) Manon Bollegraf	6–3, 6–2
Loss	24.	May 1993	Rome	Clay	(United States) Mary Joe Fernández	(Czech Republic) Jana Novotná (Spain) Arantxa Sánchez Vicario	4–6, 2–6
Win	18.	Oct 1993	Zürich	Carpet (i)	(United States) Martina Navratilova	(United States) Gigi Fernández (Belarus) Natasha Zvereva	6–3, 5–7, 6–3
Loss	25.	Mar 1994	Houston	Clay	(United States) Katrina Adams	(Netherlands) Manon Bollegraf (United States) Martina Navratilova	4–6, 2–6
Win	19.	Jun 1994	Birmingham	Grass	(Latvia) Larisa Savchenko-Neiland	(Australia) Catherine Barclay (Australia) Kerry-Anne Guse	6–4, 6–4
Loss	26.	Oct 1995	Oakland	Carpet (i)	(United States) Katrina Adams	(United States) Lori McNeil (Czech Republic) Helena Suková	6–3, 4–6, 3–6

== Grand Slam performance timelines ==
Key
W	F	SF	QF	#R	RR	Q#	DNQ	A	NH

(W) winner; (F) finalist; (SF) semifinalist; (QF) quarterfinalist; (#R) rounds 4, 3, 2, 1; (RR) round-robin stage; (Q#) qualification round; (DNQ) did not qualify; (A) absent; (NH) not held; (SR) strike rate (events won / competed); (W–L) win–loss record.

=== Singles ===
Tournament	1980	1981	1982	1983	1984	1985	1986	1987	1988	1989	1990	1991	1992	1993	1994	1995	1996	Career SR
Australian Open	A	A	1R	SF	1R	QF	NH	QF	2R	QF	QF	4R	4R	3R	1R	3R	A	0 / 13
French Open	A	A	QF	1R	4R	2R	3R	A	4R	3R	1R	1R	A	1R	1R	1R	A	0 / 12
Wimbledon	A	A	4R	1R	2R	SF	2R	A	QF	2R	F	QF	4R	4R	QF	3R	A	0 / 13
US Open	2R	1R	4R	4R	3R	QF	4R	4R	SF	SF	QF	4R	4R	3R	4R	4R	1R	0 / 17
SR	0 / 1	0 / 1	0 / 4	0 / 4	0 / 4	0 / 4	0 / 3	0 / 2	0 / 4	0 / 4	0 / 4	0 / 4	0 / 3	0 / 4	0 / 4	0 / 4	0 / 1	0 / 55
Year-end ranking	NR	NR	16	12	9	8	11	9	9	4	8	12	18	14	24	22	255	

=== Doubles ===
Tournament	1981	1982	1983	1984	1985	1986	1987	1988	1989	1990	1991	1992	1993	1994	1995	1996	1997	Career SR
Australian Open	A	1R	2R	QF	QF	NH	F	SF	3R	1R	2R	F	QF	QF	1R	A	A	0 / 13
French Open	A	2R	1R	1R	1R	1R	A	QF	QF	1R	QF	1R	3R	3R	QF	A	A	0 / 13
Wimbledon	A	1R	2R	2R	2R	3R	A	SF	QF	SF	SF	QF	SF	1R	3R	A	A	0 / 13
US Open	2R	1R	3R	1R	SF	QF	QF	2R	3R	3R	SF	QF	A	A	3R	1R	1R	0 / 15
SR	0 / 1	0 / 4	0 / 4	0 / 4	0 / 4	0 / 3	0 / 2	0 / 4	0 / 4	0 / 4	0 / 4	0 / 4	0 / 3	0 / 3	0 / 4	0 / 1	0 / 1	0 / 54
Year-end ranking				40	44	18	7	7	9	13	12	10	13	21	27	90	NR	

=== Mixed doubles ===
Tournament	1982	1983	1984	1985	1986	1987	1988	1989	1990	1991	1992	1993	1994	1995	1996	Career SR
Australian Open	NH	NH	NH	NH	NH	W	1R	F	F	1R	A	F	1R	A	A	1 / 7
French Open	A	QF	A	3R	A	A	2R	SF	2R	3R	A	2R	2R	3R	A	0 / 9
Wimbledon	A	QF	1R	2R	1R	A	W	3R	W	2R	2R	3R	1R	A	A	2 / 11
US Open	QF	2R	A	QF	2R	SF	QF	QF	QF	1R	QF	1R	2R	A	1R	0 / 13
SR	0 / 1	0 / 3	0 / 1	0 / 3	0 / 2	1 / 2	1 / 4	0 / 4	1 / 4	0 / 4	0 / 2	0 / 4	0 / 4	0 / 1	0 / 1	3 / 40
