= Gary Muller =

South African tennis player

- Country (sports): / South Africa
- Residence: Toronto, Ontario
- Born: 27 December 1964 (age 61) Durban, South Africa
- Height: 1.90 m (6 ft 3 in)
- Turned pro: 1985
- Retired: 1997
- Plays: Left-handed (one-handed backhand)
- Prize money: $1,447,455

Singles
- Career record: 85–118
- Career titles: 0
- Highest ranking: No. 49 (6 August 1990)

Grand Slam singles results
- Australian Open: 3R (1987)
- French Open: 2R (1991)
- Wimbledon: 2R (1991)
- US Open: 3R (1990)

Doubles
- Career record: 264–238
- Career titles: 8
- Highest ranking: No. 7 (15 November 1993)

Grand Slam doubles results
- Australian Open: SF (1990)
- French Open: QF (1991)
- Wimbledon: SF (1988, 1993)
- US Open: SF (1986)

Gary Muller (born 27 December 1964) is a former professional South African tennis player.

Muller turned pro in 1985. His 12-year career included wins over Andre Agassi, Jim Courier, Michael Chang and Stefan Edberg. Muller's best singles result at a Grand Slam was reaching the third round in the 1987 Australian Open in which he lost to Miloslav Mečíř of Czechoslovakia. A more successful doubles player than singles, Muller won eight doubles titles in his career with six different partners and reached a career highest ranking of 7th in November 1993. He reached the semi-final of the men's doubles at four Grand Slams (1986 US Open, 1988 Wimbledon, 1990 Australian Open and 1993 Wimbledon). Muller still holds the record for the most aces served in a three set match (54) in a 1993 Wimbledon Qualifying match against Peter Lundgren.

After his retirement in 1997 Muller worked for eight years as an ATP Tour coach during which time he worked with Jonas Björkman, Stefan Koubek, Sargis Sargsian and Thomas Johansson. He was with Dominic Thiem as his Touring Coach when he clinched the title in Rio in 2017.

Muller was on the ATP Board of Directors as a Player Representative from 2002 to 2004.

He currently resides in Ontario, Canada with his wife and four children.

== Career finals ==
=== Doubles (8 wins, 12 losses) ===
Result	No.	Date	Tournament	Surface	Partner	Opponents	Score
Win	1.	Jul 1987	Schenectady, U.S.	Hard	(United States) Gary Donnelly	(United States) Brad Pearce (United States) Jim Pugh	7–6, 6–2
Loss	1.	Nov 1988	Johannesburg, South Africa	Hard (i)	(United States) Tim Wilkison	(United States) Kevin Curren (United States) David Pate	6–7, 4–6
Win	2.	Jul 1989	Washington, U.S.	Hard	(United Kingdom) Neil Broad	(United States) Jim Grabb (United States) Patrick McEnroe	6–7, 7–6, 6–4
Loss	2.	Aug 1990	Cincinnati, U.S.	Hard	(United Kingdom) Neil Broad	(Australia) Darren Cahill (Australia) Mark Kratzmann	6–7, 2–6
Loss	3.	Sep 1990	Basel, Switzerland	Hard (i)	(United Kingdom) Neil Broad	(South Africa) Stefan Kruger (South Africa) Christo van Rensburg	6–4, 6–7, 3–6
Win	3.	Oct 1990	Toulouse, France	Hard	(United Kingdom) Neil Broad	(Denmark) Michael Mortensen (Netherlands) Michiel Schapers	7–6, 6–4
Win	4.	Jul 1991	Gstaad, Switzerland	Clay	(South Africa) Danie Visser	(France) Guy Forget (Switzerland) Jakob Hlasek	7–6, 6–4
Win	5.	Oct 1991	Vienna, Austria	Carpet (i)	(Sweden) Anders Järryd	(Switzerland) Jakob Hlasek (United States) Patrick McEnroe	6–4, 7–5
Loss	4.	Feb 1992	Memphis, U.S.	Hard (i)	(United States) Kevin Curren	(Australia) Todd Woodbridge (Australia) Mark Woodforde	5–7, 6–4, 6–7
Win	6.	Apr 1992	Seoul, South Korea	Hard	(United States) Kevin Curren	(New Zealand) Kelly Evernden (United States) Brad Pearce	7–6, 6–4
Loss	5.	Apr 1993	Seoul, South Korea	Hard	(United Kingdom) Neil Broad	(Sweden) Jan Apell (Sweden) Peter Nyborg	7–5, 6–7, 2–6
Loss	6.	Jun 1993	London/Queen's Club, U.K.	Grass	(United Kingdom) Neil Broad	(Australia) Todd Woodbridge (Australia) Mark Woodforde	7–6, 3–6, 4–6
Loss	7.	Jul 1993	Stuttgart, Germany	Clay	(South Africa) Piet Norval	(Netherlands) Tom Nijssen (Czech Republic) Cyril Suk	6–7, 3–6
Win	7.	Oct 1993	Lyon, France	Carpet (i)	(South Africa) Danie Visser	(South Africa) John-Laffnie de Jager (South Africa) Stefan Kruger	6–3, 7–6
Loss	8.	Oct 1993	Stockholm, Sweden	Carpet (i)	(South Africa) Danie Visser	(Australia) Todd Woodbridge (Australia) Mark Woodforde	1–6, 6–3, 2–6
Loss	9.	Jun 1994	Halle, Germany	Grass	(France) Henri Leconte	(France) Olivier Delaître (France) Guy Forget	4–6, 7–6, 4–6
Loss	10.	Oct 1994	Ostrava, Czech Republic	Carpet	(South Africa) Piet Norval	(Czech Republic) Martin Damm (Czech Republic) Karel Nováček	4–6, 6–1, 3–6
Loss	11.	Mar 1995	Indian Wells, USA	Hard	(South Africa) Piet Norval	(United States) Tommy Ho (New Zealand) Brett Steven	4–6, 6–7
Loss	12.	Oct 1996	Beijing, China	Hard (i)	(Germany) Patrik Kühnen	(Czech Republic) Martin Damm (Russia) Andrei Olhovskiy	4–6, 5–7
Win	8.	Feb 1997	San Jose, U.S.	Hard (i)	(United States) Brian MacPhie	(The Bahamas) Mark Knowles (Canada) Daniel Nestor	4–6, 7–6, 7–5
