= 1987 Australian Open – Men's doubles =

Men's doubles
- 1987 Australian Open

Final
- Champions: (Sweden) Stefan Edberg; (Sweden) Anders Järryd
- Runners-up: (Australia) Peter Doohan; (Australia) Laurie Warder
- Score: 6–4, 6–4, 7–6^{(7–3)}

Details
- Draw: 48
- Seeds: 16

Events
Singles	men	women		boys	girls
Doubles	men	women	mixed	boys	girls
WC Singles	men	women	quad
WC Doubles	men	women	quad
Legends	men	women	mixed
- Australian Open

Paul Annacone and Christo van Rensburg were the defending champions, but lost in the semifinals to Swedes and top seeds Stefan Edberg and Anders Järryd.

Edberg and Järryd won the 1987 Australian Open men's doubles tennis tournament, defeating home players Peter Doohan and Laurie Warder in the final 6–4, 6–4, 7–6^{(7–3)}.

== Seeds ==
All seeds receive a bye into the second round.

1. (Sweden) Stefan Edberg / (Sweden) Anders Järryd (champions)
2. (West Germany) Boris Becker / (Socialist Federal Republic of Yugoslavia) Slobodan Živojinović (third round)
3. (United States) Ken Flach / (United States) Robert Seguso (semifinals)
4. (United States) Paul Annacone / (South Africa) Christo van Rensburg (semifinals)
5. (United States) Scott Davis / (United States) Brad Gilbert (second round)
6. (Australia) Pat Cash / (United States) Gary Donnelly (third round)
7. (Australia) John Fitzgerald / (United States) Johan Kriek (second round)
8. (Switzerland) Jakob Hlasek / (United States) Sherwood Stewart (third round)
9. (Australia) Mark Edmondson / (Australia) Kim Warwick (second round)
10. (Australia) Broderick Dyke / (Australia) Wally Masur (quarterfinals)
11. (Australia) Darren Cahill / (Australia) Mark Kratzmann (quarterfinals)
12. (South Africa) Gary Muller / (United States) Todd Nelson (quarterfinals)
13. (South Africa) Eddie Edwards / (South Africa) Danie Visser (third round)
14. (United States) Kevin Curren / (France) Henri Leconte (third round)
15. (Mexico) Leonardo Lavalle / (United States) Brad Pearce (second round)
16. (Australia) Peter Doohan / (Australia) Laurie Warder (final)

== Draw ==
Key

- Q = Qualifier
- WC = Wild card
- LL = Lucky loser
- Alt = Alternate
- ITF = ITF entry
- PR = Protected ranking
- SR = Special ranking
- SE = Special exempt
- JE = Junior exempt
- JR = Junior Accelerator Programme entrant
- CO = College Accelerator Programme entrant
- NG = Next Gen Accelerator Program entrant
- w/o = Walkover
- r = Retired
- d = Defaulted

=== Finals ===
Quarterfinals

Semifinals

Final

1
(Sweden) Stefan Edberg
(Sweden) Anders Järryd
6
3
6
3
6

10
(Australia) Broderick Dyke
(Australia) Wally Masur
3
6
3
6
4

1
(Sweden) Stefan Edberg
(Sweden) Anders Järryd
6
7
6

4
(United States) Paul Annacone
(South Africa) Christo van Rensburg
3
6
3

4
(United States) Paul Annacone
(South Africa) Christo van Rensburg
6
6
7
6

12
(South Africa) Gary Muller
(United States) Todd Nelson
7
4
6
2

1
(Sweden) Stefan Edberg
(Sweden) Anders Järryd
6
6
7^{7}

16
(Australia) Peter Doohan
(Australia) Laurie Warder
4
4
6^{3}

11
(Australia) Darren Cahill
(Australia) Mark Kratzmann
4
4
4

3
(United States) Ken Flach
(United States) Robert Seguso
6
6
6

3
(United States) Ken Flach
(United States) Robert Seguso
6
3
6
4
8

16
(Australia) Peter Doohan
(Australia) Laurie Warder
1
6
1
6
10

- (Australia) Antony Emerson
- (Australia) Des Tyson
4
3
4

16
(Australia) Peter Doohan
(Australia) Laurie Warder
6
6
6

=== Top half ===
==== Section 1 ====
First round

Second round

Third round

Quarterfinals

1
(Sweden) S Edberg
(Sweden) A Järryd
7
6

- (Australia) D Macpherson
- (Australia) S Youl
6
3
14

- (Australia) D Macpherson
- (Australia) S Youl
6
3

- (Australia) R Barlow
- (United Kingdom) D Felgate
3
6
12

1
(Sweden) S Edberg
(Sweden) A Järryd
6
2
6

- (Germany) C Saceanu
- (Switzerland) D Utzinger
7
7

- (Germany) C Saceanu
- (Switzerland) D Utzinger
4
6
2

- (Australia) M Fancutt
- (United States) H Pfister
6
6

- (Germany) C Saceanu
- (Switzerland) D Utzinger
6
6

15
- (Mexico) L Lavalle
- (United States) B Pearce
4
2

1
(Sweden) S Edberg
(Sweden) A Järryd
6
3
6
3
6

10
- (Australia) B Dyke
- (Australia) W Masur
3
6
3
6
4

10
- (Australia) B Dyke
- (Australia) W Masur
6
7
6

- (Israel) G Bloom
- (Germany) P Kühnen
3
6
3

- (New Zealand) K Evernden
- (United States) B Green
7
6
4

- (New Zealand) K Evernden
- (United States) B Green
6
3
6

10
- (Australia) B Dyke
- (Australia) W Masur
6
6
6

- (Israel) A Mansdorf
- (Netherlands) H van Boeckel
6
6

8
- (Switzerland) J Hlasek
- (United States) S Stewart
7
1
4

WC
- (Australia) S Barr
- (Australia) J Stoltenberg
4
4

- (Israel) A Mansdorf
- (Netherlands) H van Boeckel
7
5
1

8
- (Switzerland) J Hlasek
- (United States) S Stewart
6
7
6

==== Section 2 ====
First round

Second round

Third round

Quarterfinals

4
(United States) P Annacone
(South Africa) C van Rensburg
4
6
6

- (Australia) R Fricker
- (Australia) G Pfitzner
7
4
2

- (United Kingdom) J Bates
- (United Kingdom) A Castle
6
4
4

- (United Kingdom) J Bates
- (United Kingdom) A Castle
5
6
6

4
(United States) P Annacone
(South Africa) C van Rensburg
2
7
14

- (United States) S Denton
- (United States) D Dowlen
6
6

14
- (United States) K Curren
- (France) H Leconte
6
6
12

- (Australia) C Limberger
- (Australia) M Woodforde
3
2

- (United States) S Denton
- (United States) D Dowlen
3
4

14
- (United States) K Curren
- (France) H Leconte
6
6

4
(United States) P Annacone
(South Africa) C van Rensburg
6
6
7
6

12
- (South Africa) G Muller
- (United States) T Nelson
7
4
6
2

12
- (South Africa) G Muller
- (United States) T Nelson
6
7

- (Canada) G Connell
- (United States) C Kennedy
6
7

- (Canada) G Connell
- (United States) C Kennedy
3
5

- (New Zealand) B Derlin
- (New Zealand) R Simpson
4
6

12
- (South Africa) G Muller
- (United States) T Nelson
7
7

- (United States) K Richter
- (United States) R Rudeen
7
7

6
- (Australia) P Cash
- (United States) G Donnelly
6
5

- (Australia) P Carter
- (Australia) A Lane
6
6

- (United States) K Richter
- (United States) R Rudeen
3
3

6
- (Australia) P Cash
- (United States) G Donnelly
6
6

=== Bottom half ===
==== Section 3 ====
First round

Second round

Third round

Quarterfinals

5
(United States) S Davis
(United States) B Gilbert
6
3
3

- (Czechoslovakia) M Mečíř
- (Czechoslovakia) M Šrejber
4
7
15

- (Czechoslovakia) M Mečíř
- (Czechoslovakia) M Šrejber
4
6
6

Alt
- (United States) T Siegel
- (United States) M Smith
6
5
13

- (Czechoslovakia) M Mečíř
- (Czechoslovakia) M Šrejber
7
3
4

- (Australia) P McNamara
- (Australia) P McNamee
7
6

11
- (Australia) D Cahill
- (Australia) M Kratzmann
6
6
6

- (United States) M De Palmer
- (United States) B Testerman
6
4

- (Australia) P McNamara
- (Australia) P McNamee
2
5

11
- (Australia) D Cahill
- (Australia) M Kratzmann
6
7

11
- (Australia) D Cahill
- (Australia) M Kratzmann
4
4
4

3
- (United States) K Flach
- (United States) R Seguso
6
6
6

13
- (South Africa) E Edwards
- (South Africa) D Visser
6
3
10

- (United States) K Jones
- (United States) T Wilkison
6
6

- (United States) K Jones
- (United States) T Wilkison
3
6
8

WC
- (Australia) S Furlong
- (Australia) C Miller
3
2

13
- (South Africa) E Edwards
- (South Africa) D Visser
3
2

- (Canada) G Michibata
- (United States) B Schultz
6
6

3
- (United States) K Flach
- (United States) R Seguso
6
6

- (Argentina) J Frana
- (Argentina) C Miniussi
2
2

- (Canada) G Michibata
- (United States) B Schultz
5
6

3
- (United States) K Flach
- (United States) R Seguso
7
7

==== Section 4 ====
First round

Second round

Third round

Quarterfinals

7
(Australia) J Fitzgerald
(United States) J Kriek
6
6
3

- (Australia) D Graham
- (United States) R Matuszewski
3
4

- (Nigeria) T Mmoh
- (Nigeria) N Odizor
1
7
6

- (Nigeria) T Mmoh
- (Nigeria) N Odizor
6
6

- (Nigeria) T Mmoh
- (Nigeria) N Odizor
6
3

- (Australia) B Drewett
- (Netherlands) M Schapers
7
4
4

- (Australia) A Emerson
- (Australia) D Tyson
7
6

- (Australia) A Emerson
- (Australia) D Tyson
5
6
6

- (Australia) A Emerson
- (Australia) D Tyson
6
6
10

9
- (Australia) M Edmondson
- (Australia) K Warwick
3
7
8

- (Australia) A Emerson
- (Australia) D Tyson
4
3
4

16
- (Australia) P Doohan
- (Australia) L Warder
6
6
6

16
- (Australia) P Doohan
- (Australia) L Warder
7
6

- (United States) J Levine
- (United States) L Shiras
6
3
4

- (United States) M Anger
- (United States) T Pawsat
6
3

- (United States) M Anger
- (United States) T Pawsat
3
6
6

16
- (Australia) P Doohan
- (Australia) L Warder
6
7

- (Sweden) J Carlsson
- (Sweden) P Carlsson
6
3

2
- (West Germany) B Becker
- (Socialist Federal Republic of Yugoslavia) S Živojinović
3
6

- (United States) J Letts
- (South Africa) M Robertson
7
6

- (United States) J Letts
- (South Africa) M Robertson
6
4
4

2
- (West Germany) B Becker
- (Socialist Federal Republic of Yugoslavia) S Živojinović
2
6
6
