= Anne Hobbs =

British tennis player

- Country (sports): United Kingdom
- Born: 21 August 1959 (age 66) Nottingham, England
- Height: 1.68 m (5 ft 6 in)
- Plays: Right-handed
- Prize money: $510,610

Singles
- Career record: 39–51
- Career titles: 2
- Highest ranking: No. 33 (30 November 1981)

Grand Slam singles results
- Australian Open: 4R (1987)
- French Open: 4R (1983)
- Wimbledon: 4R (1981, 1984)
- US Open: 4R (1987)

Doubles
- Career record: 71–45
- Career titles: 8
- Highest ranking: No. 6 (17 September 1984)

Grand Slam doubles results
- Australian Open: F (1983)
- French Open: SF (1983)
- Wimbledon: SF (1983)
- US Open: F (1984)

Mixed doubles
- Career record: 15–18 (45%)
- Career titles: 0

Grand Slam mixed doubles results
- Australian Open: F (1987)
- Wimbledon: QF (1984)
- US Open: QF (1983)
- Last updated on: 11 June 2011.

Anne Hobbs (born 21 August 1959 in Nottingham) is a British former professional tennis player.

== Early life ==
She started with Wilmslow Tennis Club.

She lived at Alderley Edge.

== Tennis career ==
Hobbs represented Great Britain in the Wightman Cup and Federation Cup from 1978 to 1989. She was ranked as the top British player for periods during her 12-year career and achieved a best WTA ranking of 33 in singles and 6 in doubles.

Although primarily a doubles specialist, reaching the final of the Australian Open in 1983 and the US Open in 1984 with Wendy Turnbull and the Australian Open Mixed Doubles in 1987 with Andrew Castle, she won singles titles at Indianapolis in 1983 and in Auckland in 1985 and the British Closed in 1985.

She had singles victories over Virginia Wade, Rosie Casals, Jo Durie, Carling Bassett, and Zina Garrison. She works as a tennis coach and consultant in the area of sports psychology.

== WTA Tour finals ==
=== Singles (2–0) ===
| Legend Grand Slam (0/0) WTA Championships (0/0) Tier I (0/0) Tier II (0/0) Tier III (0/0) Tier IV & V (0/0) Uncategorised (2/0) | Finals by surface Hard (1/0) Clay (0/0) Grass (1/0) Carpet (0/0) |

| Result | Date | Category | Tournament | Surface | Opponent | Score |
|---|---|---|---|---|---|---|
| Win | Feb 1983 | $50,000 | Indianapolis, United States | Hard | (United States) Ginny Purdy | 6–4, 6–7, 6–4 |
| Win | Dec 1985 | $50,000 | Auckland, New Zealand | Grass | (Australia) Louise Field | 6–3, 6–1 |

=== Doubles (8–12) ===
| Legend Grand Slam (0/2) WTA Championships (0/0) Tier I (0/0) Tier II (0/0) Tier III (0/0) Tier IV & V (0/0) Uncategorised (8/10) | Finals by surface Hard (2/2) Clay (1/5) Grass (4/4) Carpet (1/1) |

| Result | Date | Category | Tournament | Surface | Partnering | Opponents | Score |
|---|---|---|---|---|---|---|---|
| Loss | Dec 1978 | $75,000 | Sydney, Australia | Grass | (New Zealand) Judy Chaloner | (Australia) Kerry Reid (Australia) Wendy Turnbull | 2–6, 6–4, 2–6 |
| Loss | Nov 1981 | $50,000 | Hong Kong | Clay | (Australia) Susan Leo | (United States) Ann Kiyomura (United States) Sharon Walsh | 3–6, 4–6 |
| Win | Jun 1982 | $100,000 | Birmingham, Great Britain | Grass | (United Kingdom) Jo Durie | (United States) Rosie Casals (Australia) Wendy Turnbull | 6–3, 6–2 |
| Win | May 1983 | $150,000 | Berlin, Germany | Carpet | (United Kingdom) Jo Durie | (West Germany) Claudia Kohde-Kilsch (West Germany) Eva Pfaff | 6–4, 7–6^{(7–2)} |
| Loss | Jun 1983 | $150,000 | Eastbourne, Great Britain | Grass | (United Kingdom) Jo Durie | (United States) Martina Navratilova (United States) Pam Shriver | 1–6, 0–6 |
| Win | Aug 1983 | $200,000 | Toronto, Canada | Hard | (United States) Andrea Jaeger | (South Africa) Rosalyn Fairbank (United States) Candy Reynolds | 6–4, 5–7, 7–5 |
| Win | Nov 1983 | $150,000 | Brisbane, Australia | Grass | (Australia) Wendy Turnbull | (United States) Pam Shriver (United States) Sharon Walsh | 6–3, 6–4 |
| Win | Nov 1983 | $150,000 | Sydney, Australia | Grass | (Australia) Wendy Turnbull | (Czechoslovakia) Hana Mandlíková (Czechoslovakia) Helena Suková | 6–4, 6–3 |
| Loss | Dec 1983 | Grand Slam | Australian Open, Australia | Grass | (Australia) Wendy Turnbull | (United States) Martina Navratilova (United States) Pam Shriver | 4–6, 7–6, 2–6 |
| Win | Jan 1984 | $50,000 | Denver, United States | Hard | (Netherlands) Marcella Mesker | (United States) Sherry Acker (United States) Candy Reynolds | 6–2, 6–3 |
| Loss | Jan 1984 | $100,000 | Marco Island, United States | Clay | (United States) Andrea Jaeger | (Czechoslovakia) Hana Mandlíková (Czechoslovakia) Helena Suková | 6–3, 2–6, 2–6 |
| Loss | Apr 1984 | $200,000 | Hilton Head, United States | Clay | (United States) Sharon Walsh | (West Germany) Claudia Kohde-Kilsch (Czechoslovakia) Hana Mandlíková | 5–7, 2–6 |
| Loss | Apr 1984 | $250,000 | Amelia Island, United States | Clay | (Socialist Federal Republic of Yugoslavia) Mima Jaušovec | (United States) Kathy Jordan (United States) Anne Smith | 4–6, 6–3, 4–6 |
| Loss | Apr 1984 | $200,000 | Orlando, United States | Clay | (Australia) Wendy Turnbull | (West Germany) Claudia Kohde-Kilsch (Czechoslovakia) Hana Mandlíková | 0–6, 6–1, 3–6 |
| Win | May 1984 | $150,000 | Berlin, Germany | Clay | (United States) Candy Reynolds | (United States) Kathy Horvath (Romania) Virginia Ruzici | 6–3, 4–6, 7–6^{(13–11)} |
| Loss | Sep 1984 | Grand Slam | US Open, United States | Hard | (Australia) Wendy Turnbull | (United States) Martina Navratilova (United States) Pam Shriver | 2–6, 4–6 |
| Loss | May 1985 | $75,000 | Melbourne, Australia | Carpet | (United States) Kathy Jordan | (United States) Pam Shriver (Australia) Liz Smylie | 2–6, 7–5, 1–6 |
| Win | Dec 1985 | $50,000 | Auckland, New Zealand | Grass | (United States) Candy Reynolds | (United States) Lea Antonoplis (Argentina) Adriana Villagrán | 6–1, 6–3 |
| Loss | Jul 1987 | $150,000 | Newport, United States | Grass | (United States) Kathy Jordan | (United States) Gigi Fernández (United States) Lori McNeil | 6–7^{(5–7)}, 5–7 |
| Loss | Aug 1987 | $150,000 | Mahwah, United States | Hard | (Australia) Liz Smylie | (United States) Gigi Fernández (United States) Lori McNeil | 3–6, 2–6 |

=== Mixed doubles (0–1) ===
Finals by surface
Hard (0/0)
Clay (0/0)
Grass (0/1)
Carpet (0/0)

| Result | Date | Category | Tournament | Surface | Partnering | Opponents | Score |
|---|---|---|---|---|---|---|---|
| Loss | Jan 1987 | Grand Slam | Australian Open, Australia | Grass | (United Kingdom) Andrew Castle | (United States) Sherwood Stewart (United States) Zina Garrison | 6–3, 6–7^{(5–7)}, 2–6 |

== Performance timelines ==
Key
| W | F | SF | QF | #R | RR | Q# | DNQ | A | NH |

(W) winner; (F) finalist; (SF) semifinalist; (QF) quarterfinalist; (#R) rounds 4, 3, 2, 1; (RR) round-robin stage; (Q#) qualification round; (DNQ) did not qualify; (A) absent; (NH) not held; (SR) strike rate (events won / competed); (W–L) win–loss record.

( * ) Received a bye in the first round.

=== Singles ===
| Tournament | 1977 | 1978 | 1979 | 1980 | 1981 | 1982 | 1983 | 1984 | 1985 | 1986 | 1987 | 1988 | 1989 | W–L |
|---|---|---|---|---|---|---|---|---|---|---|---|---|---|---|
| Australian Open | A / A | A | A | A | 2R | A | 2R | A | 3R | NH | 4R | A | A | 7–4 |
| French Open | A | A | 2R | 2R | 2R* | 1R | 4R | 2R | 1R | 3R | A | A | A | 8–8 |
| Wimbledon | 2R* | 1R | 2R | 2R* | 4R | 2R* | 1R | 4R | 2R | 3R | 2R | A | 3R | 13–12 |
| US Open | A | 3R* | 2R* | 2R | 1R | A | 1R | 1R | 3R | 1R | 4R | A | A | 7–9 |
| Year-end Ranking | – | 61 | 82 | 41 | 34 | 104 | 46 | 59 | 40 | 99 | 42 | – | 229 | N/A |

=== Doubles ===
| Tournament | 1982 | 1983 | 1984 | 1985 | 1986 | 1987 | 1988 | 1989 | W–L |
|---|---|---|---|---|---|---|---|---|---|
| Australian Open | A | F | A | SF | NH | QF | A | A | 9–3 |
| French Open | 3R* | SF | 3R | 3R | 2R | A | A | A | 10–5 |
| Wimbledon | 2R | SF* | 2R | 1R | 1R | 3R | A | 1R | 7–7 |
| US Open | A | QF | F | 3R | 1R | SF | A | 1R | 14–6 |
| Year-end Ranking | – | – | 15 | 20 | 36 | 18 | – | 99 | N/A |

=== Mixed doubles ===
| Tournament | 1978 | 1979 | 1980 | 1981 | 1982 | 1983 | 1984 | 1985 | 1986 | 1987 | 1988 | 1989 | W–L |
|---|---|---|---|---|---|---|---|---|---|---|---|---|---|
| Australian Open | A | A | A | A | A | A | A | A | NH | F | A | A | 4–1 |
| French Open | A | A | A | A | A | A | A | A | A | A | A | A | 0–0 |
| Wimbledon | 1R | 1R | 1R | 2R* | 1R | 1R | QF | 2R | 3R | 1R | A | 2R | 7–11 |
| US Open | A | A | 2R | 1R | A | QF | 2R | A | 1R | 1R | A | A | 4–6 |

=== Fed Cup ===
World Group
| Date | Venue | Surface | Round | Opponents | Final match score | Match | Opponent | Rubber score |
| 27 Nov – 3 Dec 1978 | Kooyong Club, Melbourne, Australia | Grass (O) | R1 | Spain | 3–0 | Doubles (with Michelle Tyler) | Álvarez/Perea | 8–6, 2–6, 6–2 (W) |
| 27 Nov – 3 Dec 1978 | Kooyong Club, Melbourne, Australia | Grass (O) | SF | United States | 0–3 | Doubles (with Sue Barker) | Casals/King | 6–1, 3–6, 4–6 (L) |
| 30 Apr – 6 May 1979 | Madrid, Spain | Clay (O) | QF | Czechoslovakia | 0–3 | Doubles (with Michelle Tyler) | Mandlíková/Tomanová | 6–8, 5–7 (L) |
| 19–25 Jul 1982 | Santa Clara, United States | Hard (O) | R1 | Italy | 2–1 | Doubles (with Jo Durie) | Murgo/Simmonds | 6–4, 6–3 (W) |
| 19–25 Jul 1982 | Santa Clara, United States | Hard (O) | R2 | Israel | 3–0 | Doubles (with Virginia Wade) | Bialistozky/Binyamini | 6–2, 6–1 (W) |
| 19–25 Jul 1982 | Santa Clara, United States | Hard (O) | QF | Czechoslovakia | 1–2 | Doubles (with Jo Durie) | Budařová/Suková | 6–2, 4–6, 6–3 (W) |
| 17–24 Jul 1983 | Zürich, Switzerland | Clay (O) | R1 | Luxembourg | 3–0 | Doubles (with Jo Durie) | Huberty/Wolter | 6–0, 6–0 (W) |
| 17–24 Jul 1983 | Zürich, Switzerland | Clay (O) | R2 | Brazil | 3–0 | Doubles (with Jo Durie) | Medrado/Monteiro | 6–3, 6–2 (W) |
| 17–24 Jul 1983 | Zürich, Switzerland | Clay (O) | QF | West Germany | 1–2 | Doubles (with Jo Durie) | Bunge/Pfaff | 3–6, 6–4, 10–8 (W) |
| 15–22 Jul 1984 | São Paulo, Brazil | Clay (O) | R1 | Bulgaria | 0–3 | Singles | Katerina Maleeva | 4–6, 6–3, 2–6 (L) |
| 15–22 Jul 1984 | São Paulo, Brazil | Clay (O) | R1 | Bulgaria | 0–3 | Doubles (with Amanda Brown) | K. Maleeva/Maleeva-Fragniere | 6–7, 5–7 (L) |
| 15–22 Jul 1984 | São Paulo, Brazil | Clay (O) | R2 * (Consolation) | Hungary | 2–1 | Singles | Andrea Ritecz | 2–6, 6–7 (L) |
| 15–22 Jul 1984 | São Paulo, Brazil | Clay (O) | QF (Consolation) | Canada | 2–1 | Singles | Claudine Pelletier | 5–7, 6–2, 4–6 (L) |
| 15–22 Jul 1984 | São Paulo, Brazil | Clay (O) | SF (Consolation) | Brazil | 1–2 | Doubles (with Amanda Brown) | Medrado/Monteiro | 5–7, 5–7 (L) |
| 6–14 Oct 1985 | Nagoya, Japan | Hard (O) | R1 | West Germany | 3–0 | Doubles (with Jo Durie) | Betzner/Keppeler | 6–4, 3–6, 6–1 (W) |
| 6–14 Oct 1985 | Nagoya, Japan | Hard (O) | R2 | Japan | 2–1 | Singles | Masako Yanagi | 7–5, 3–6, 2–6 (L) |
| 6–14 Oct 1985 | Nagoya, Japan | Hard (O) | R2 | Japan | 2–1 | Doubles (with Jo Durie) | Inoue/Yanagi | 6–7^{(2–7)}, 6–3, 6–2 (W) |
| 6–14 Oct 1985 | Nagoya, Japan | Hard (O) | QF | Bulgaria | 1–2 | Doubles (with Jo Durie) | K. Maleeva/Maleeva-Fragniere | 5–4, ret. (W) |
| 20–27 Jul 1986 | Prague, Czechoslovakia | Clay (O) | R1 | Denmark | 0–3 | Singles | Lone Vandborg | 6–3, 5–7, 3–6 (L) |
| 20–27 Jul 1986 | Prague, Czechoslovakia | Clay (O) | R1 | Denmark | 0–3 | Doubles (with Jo Durie) | Moller/Scheuer-Larsen | 2–6, 6–7^{(1–7)} (L) |
| 20–27 Jul 1986 | Prague, Czechoslovakia | Clay (O) | R2 * (Consolation) | Finland | 3–0 | Singles | Maija Suonpaa | 6–2, 6–0 (W) |
| 20–27 Jul 1986 | Prague, Czechoslovakia | Clay (O) | R2 * (Consolation) | Finland | 3–0 | Doubles (with Annabel Croft) | Suonpaa/Thorén | 6–0, 6–1 (W) |
| 20–27 Jul 1986 | Prague, Czechoslovakia | Clay (O) | QF (Consolation) | Indonesia | 3–0 | Singles | Yayuk Basuki | 7–5, 7–5 (W) |
| 20–27 Jul 1986 | Prague, Czechoslovakia | Clay (O) | QF (Consolation) | Indonesia | 3–0 | Doubles (with Annabel Croft) | Anggarkusuma/Basuki | 6–2, 4–6, 6–2 (W) |
| 20–27 Jul 1986 | Prague, Czechoslovakia | Clay (O) | SF (Consolation) | Hungary | 3–0 | Singles | Réka Szikszay | 6–3, 6–2 (W) |
| 20–27 Jul 1986 | Prague, Czechoslovakia | Clay (O) | SF (Consolation) | Hungary | 3–0 | Doubles (with Annabel Croft) | Inoue/Szikszay | 2–1, ret. (W) |
| 20–27 Jul 1986 | Prague, Czechoslovakia | Clay (O) | F (Consolation) | Soviet Union | 2–1 | Singles | Natalia Zvereva | 6–3, 7–5 (W) |
| 20–27 Jul 1986 | Prague, Czechoslovakia | Clay (O) | F (Consolation) | Soviet Union | 2–1 | Doubles (with Annabel Croft) | Egorova/Cherneva | 2–6, 1–6 (L) |
| 26 Jul – 2 Aug 1987 | Vancouver, Canada | N/A | R1 | Chile | 3–0 | Doubles (with Jo Durie) | Espinoza/Miranda | 6–1, 6–0 (W) |
| 26 Jul – 2 Aug 1987 | Vancouver, Canada | N/A | R2 | Italy | 2–1 | Doubles (with Jo Durie) | Cecchini/Reggi-Concato | 6–7, 7–5, 6–4 (W) |
| 26 Jul – 2 Aug 1987 | Vancouver, Canada | N/A | QF | United States | 0–3 | Doubles (with Jo Durie) | Burgin/Garrison | 5–7, 5–7 (L) |
| 1–9 Oct 1989 | Tokyo, Japan | Hard (O) | R1 | Indonesia | 3–0 | Doubles (with Jo Durie) | Anggarkusuma/Basuki | 7–5, 6–3 (W) |
| 1–9 Oct 1989 | Tokyo, Japan | Hard (O) | R2 | Austria | 1–2 | Doubles (with Jo Durie) | Paulus/Schwarz | 3–6, 7–6^{(7–3)}, 6–3 (W) |
