= 1987 Australian Open – Mixed doubles =

Mixed doubles
- 1987 Australian Open

Final
- Champions: (United States) Zina Garrison (United States) Sherwood Stewart
- Runners-up: (United Kingdom) Anne Hobbs (United Kingdom) Andrew Castle
- Score: 3–6, 7–6^{(7–5)}, 6–3

Details
- Draw: 32
- Seeds: 8

Events
Singles	men	women		boys	girls
Doubles	men	women	mixed	boys	girls
WC Singles	men	women	quad
WC Doubles	men	women	quad
Legends	men	women	mixed
- Australian Open

This was the first mixed doubles competition held in the Australian Open tournament after the 17 years long hiatus. The previous mixed doubles competition was held in the 1969 Australian Open tournament.
Zina Garrison and Sherwood Stewart won the competition, winning in the final 3–6, 7–6^{(7–5)}, 6–3 against Anne Hobbs and Andrew Castle.

== Seeds ==
1. (Australia) Elizabeth Smylie / (Australia) John Fitzgerald (second round)
2. (United States) Martina Navratilova / (United States) Paul Annacone (semifinals)
3. (Australia) Wendy Turnbull / (Australia) Kim Warwick (second round)
4. (United States) Zina Garrison / (United States) Sherwood Stewart (champions)
5. (South Africa) Rosalyn Fairbank / (Australia) Mark Edmondson (second round)
6. (Australia) Jenny Byrne / (Australia) Mark Kratzmann (second round)
7. (United States) Gigi Fernández / (Mexico) Leonardo Lavalle (first round)
8. (Canada) Carling Bassett / (United States) Gary Donnelly (second round)

== Draw ==
Key

- Q = Qualifier
- WC = Wild card
- LL = Lucky loser
- Alt = Alternate
- ITF = ITF entry
- PR = Protected ranking
- SR = Special ranking
- SE = Special exempt
- JE = Junior exempt
- JR = Junior Accelerator Programme entrant
- CO = College Accelerator Programme entrant
- NG = Next Gen Accelerator Program entrant
- w/o = Walkover
- r = Retired
- d = Defaulted

=== Finals ===
Semifinals
(United Kingdom) Anne Hobbs (United Kingdom) Andrew Castle	6	6
(Switzerland) Christiane Jolissaint (Switzerland) Dominik Utzinger	2	3
4	(United States) Zina Garrison (United States) Sherwood Stewart	3	7	10
2	(United States) Martina Navratilova (United States) Paul Annacone	6	5	8

Final
(United Kingdom) Anne Hobbs (United Kingdom) Andrew Castle	6	6^{5}	3
4	(United States) Zina Garrison (United States) Sherwood Stewart	3	7^{7}	6

=== Top half ===
First round
1	(Australia) E Smylie (Australia) J Fitzgerald	6	6	6
(Netherlands) M van der Torre (Netherlands) M Schapers	4	7	3
WC	(Australia) M Jaggard (Australia) S Barr	6	6
(United States) C Benjamin (Nigeria) T Mmoh	3	4
(United Kingdom) A Hobbs (United Kingdom) A Castle	6	7	6
(Australia) A Tobin-Dingwall (Australia) R Barlow	7	6	1
(United States) E Burgin (Australia) D Graham	5	2
8	(Canada) C Bassett (United States) G Donnelly	7	6
3	(Australia) W Turnbull (Australia) K Warwick	6	7
(United States) S Walsh-Pete (Australia) B Drewett	2	5
(Switzerland) C Jolissaint (Switzerland) D Utzinger	6	3	6
(South Africa) E Reinach (South Africa) M Robertson	4	6	4
(United States) P Smith (Australia) L Warder	6	4
(Australia) J Tremelling (Australia) D Tyson	7	6
(United States) R White (United States) K Jones	6	4
6	(Australia) J Byrne (Australia) M Kratzmann	7	6

Second round
1	(Australia) E Smylie (Australia) J Fitzgerald	3	6
WC	(Australia) M Jaggard (Australia) S Barr	6	7
(United Kingdom) A Hobbs (United Kingdom) A Castle	6	4	6
8	(Canada) C Bassett (United States) G Donnelly	1	6	4
3	(Australia) W Turnbull (Australia) K Warwick	4	6	4
(Switzerland) C Jolissaint (Switzerland) D Utzinger	6	4	6
(Australia) J Tremelling (Australia) D Tyson	6	4	6
6	(Australia) J Byrne (Australia) M Kratzmann	4	6	4

Quarterfinals
WC	(Australia) M Jaggard (Australia) S Barr	4	7	3
(United Kingdom) A Hobbs (United Kingdom) A Castle	6	6	6
(Switzerland) C Jolissaint (Switzerland) D Utzinger	7	7
(Australia) J Tremelling (Australia) D Tyson	6	6

Semifinals
(United Kingdom) A Hobbs (United Kingdom) A Castle	6	6
(Switzerland) C Jolissaint (Switzerland) D Utzinger	2	3

=== Bottom half ===
First round
5	(South Africa) R Fairbank (Australia) M Edmondson	7	6
(United States) S Collins (New Zealand) K Evernden	6	1
(United States) A Moulton (United States) B Green	5	3
(Australia) D Balestrat (Australia) P Doohan	7	6
(Netherlands) C Bakkum (United States) R Rudeen	6	3	7
(New Zealand) J Richardson (New Zealand) B Derlin	3	6	5
(Australia) N Provis (Australia) P McNamara	5	6	4
4	(United States) Z Garrison (United States) S Stewart	7	2	6
7	(United States) G Fernández (Mexico) L Lavalle	6	4
WC	(Australia) L O'Neill (Australia) S Youl	7	6
(United States) L McNeil (United States) T Pawsat	6	7
(Czechoslovakia) H Mandlíková (Australia) M Fancutt	3	6
(New Zealand) B Cordwell (New Zealand) R Simpson	7	6	10
(United States) G Rush (United States) C Kennedy	5	7	8
(United States) C MacGregor (United States) J Letts	6	3	4
2	(United States) M Navratilova (United States) P Annacone	3	6	6

Second round
5	(South Africa) R Fairbank (Australia) M Edmondson	4	6
(Australia) D Balestrat (Australia) P Doohan	6	7
(Netherlands) C Bakkum (United States) R Rudeen	7	3	4
4	(United States) Z Garrison (United States) S Stewart	5	6	6
WC	(Australia) L O'Neill (Australia) S Youl	2	2
(United States) L McNeil (United States) T Pawsat	6	6
(New Zealand) B Cordwell (New Zealand) R Simpson	2	6	2
2	(United States) M Navratilova (United States) P Annacone	6	3	6

Quarterfinals
(Australia) D Balestrat (Australia) P Doohan	6	6	6
4	(United States) Z Garrison (United States) S Stewart	7	3	8
(United States) L McNeil (United States) T Pawsat	6	6
2	(United States) M Navratilova (United States) P Annacone	7	7

Semifinals
4	(United States) Z Garrison (United States) S Stewart	3	7	10
2	(United States) M Navratilova (United States) P Annacone	6	5	8
