= 1987 Australian Open – Women's singles =

Women's singles
- 1987 Australian Open

Final
- Champion: (Czechoslovakia) Hana Mandlíková
- Runner-up: (United States) Martina Navratilova
- Score: 7–5, 7–6^{(7–1)}

Details
- Draw: 96
- Seeds: 16

Events
Singles	men	women		boys	girls
Doubles	men	women	mixed	boys	girls
WC Singles	men	women	quad
WC Doubles	men	women	quad
Legends	men	women	mixed
- Australian Open

Hana Mandlíková defeated defending champion Martina Navratilova in the final, 7–5, 7–6^{(7–1)} to win the women's singles tennis title at the 1987 Australian Open. It was her second Australian Open title and fourth and last major singles title.

From the 1982 French Open to the 1987 Australian Open, a span of 20 majors, Mandlíková was the only woman besides Chris Evert & Martina Navratilova to win a major. In addition to the 1987 Australian Open, she won the 1985 US Open during the span.

There was no Australian Open in 1986, due to the administrative changes to make the tournament the opening major of the year (as it had been before 1977). The 1987 championship therefore followed the 1985 tournament, held over a year earlier.

This was the last edition of the tournament to be held on grass courts, as it would switch to hardcourts the following year.

== Seeds ==
1. (United States) Martina Navratilova (final)
2. (Czechoslovakia) Hana Mandlíková (champion)
3. (United States) Pam Shriver (quarterfinals)
4. (Czechoslovakia) Helena Suková (fourth round)
5. (West Germany) Claudia Kohde-Kilsch (semifinals)
6. (Bulgaria) Manuela Maleeva (fourth round)
7. (United States) Zina Garrison (quarterfinals)
8. (United States) Lori McNeil (quarterfinals)
9. (United States) Robin White (third round)
10. (Sweden) Catarina Lindqvist (semifinals)
11. (Australia) Wendy Turnbull (fourth round)
12. (Canada) Carling Bassett (fourth round)
13. (United States) Terry Phelps (second round)
14. (United Kingdom) Jo Durie (fourth round)
15. (Australia) Dianne Balestrat (third round)
16. (South Africa) Rosalyn Fairbank (second round)

== Draw ==
Key

- Q = Qualifier
- WC = Wild card
- LL = Lucky loser
- Alt = Alternate
- ITF = ITF entry
- PR = Protected ranking
- SR = Special ranking
- SE = Special exempt
- JE = Junior exempt
- JR = Junior Accelerator Programme entrant
- CO = College Accelerator Programme entrant
- NG = Next Gen Accelerator Program entrant
- w/o = Walkover
- r = Retired
- d = Defaulted

=== Finals ===
Quarterfinals
1	(United States) Martina Navratilova	6	6
7	(United States) Zina Garrison	0	3
3	(United States) Pam Shriver	3	1
10	(Sweden) Catarina Lindqvist	6	6
5	(West Germany) Claudia Kohde-Kilsch	7^{7}	4	6
(Australia) Elizabeth Smylie	6^{3}	6	2
8	(United States) Lori McNeil	0	0
2	(Czechoslovakia) Hana Mandlíková	6	6

Semifinals
1	(United States) Martina Navratilova	6	6
10	(Sweden) Catarina Lindqvist	3	2
5	(West Germany) Claudia Kohde-Kilsch	1	6	3
2	(Czechoslovakia) Hana Mandlíková	6	0	6

Final
1	(United States) Martina Navratilova	5	6^{1}
2	(Czechoslovakia) Hana Mandlíková	7	7^{7}

=== Top half ===
==== Section 1 ====
First round
(Brazil) C Monteiro	4	4
(Canada) H Kelesi	6	6
(United States) C Benjamin	0	6	6
(Australia) E Minter	6	4	4
WC	(Australia) R Bryant	6	6
(United States) L Allen	1	3
(Australia) A Tobin-Dingwall	5	7^{7}	4
(Australia) J Tremelling	7	6^{5}	6

Second round
1	(United States) M Navratilova	6	6
(United States) J Golder	0	2
(Canada) H Kelesi	6	4	4
(United States) C Benjamin	4	6	6
(United States) B Bowes	6	6^{1}	6
WC	(Australia) R Bryant	2	7^{7}	3
(Australia) J Tremelling	3	6	8
16	(South Africa) R Fairbank	6	4	6

Third round
1	(United States) M Navratilova	6	6
(United States) C Benjamin	2	1
(United States) B Bowes	3	5
(Australia) J Tremelling	6	7

Fourth round
1	(United States) M Navratilova	6	6
(Australia) J Tremelling	4	1

==== Section 2 ====
First round
WC	(Australia) L O'Neill	4	6	2
(Australia) J Byrne	6	2	6
(United States) C Macgregor	7	3	6
(Sweden) C Karlsson	5	6	2
Q	(United States) S Rimes	6	6
(United States) C Copeland	2	2
(Japan) E Okagawa	5	3
Q	(United States) H Ludloff	7	6

Second round
11	(Australia) W Turnbull	2	6	6
(Australia) J Byrne	6	4	3
(United States) J Mundel	7	4	6
(United States) C Macgregor	5	6	0
Q	(United States) S Rimes	5	3
(West Germany) E Pfaff	7	6
Q	(United States) H Ludloff	1	1
7	(United States) Z Garrison	6	6

Third round
11	(Australia) W Turnbull	4	6	6
(United States) J Mundel	6	1	2
(West Germany) E Pfaff	2	6	5
7	(United States) Z Garrison	6	3	7

Fourth round
11	(Australia) W Turnbull	1	3
7	(United States) Z Garrison	6	6

==== Section 3 ====
First round
(United States) A Moulton	4	6	6
(West Germany) C Porwik	6	4	3
(Australia) L Field	7^{7}	1	6
(United States) B Gerken	6^{2}	6	4
(United States) A Henricksson	6	6
(Czechoslovakia) R Maršíková	4	4
(Austria) J Polz	6	6
WC	(United States) S Walsh-Pete	2	4

Second round
3	(United States) P Shriver	6	4	11
(United States) A Moulton	2	6	9
(South Africa) E Reinach	6	6
(Australia) L Field	1	2
(United States) A Henricksson	6^{1}	4
(Austria) J Polz	7^{7}	6
(United States) V Nelson-Dunbar	5	1
14	(United Kingdom) J Durie	7	6

Third round
3	(United States) P Shriver	6	6
(South Africa) E Reinach	2	4
(Austria) J Polz	1	4
14	(United Kingdom) J Durie	6	6

Fourth round
3	(United States) P Shriver	6	6
14	(United Kingdom) J Durie	1	2

==== Section 4 ====
First round
(Japan) K Okamoto	2	6	4
(Belgium) A Devries	6	2	6
(France) M-C Calleja	3	6	6
(Japan) M Yanagi	6	2	2
(Switzerland) C Bartos-Cserepy	6	6
(Switzerland) E Krapl	3	4
Q	(Japan) Y Koizumi	6	2	6
(West Germany) M Schropp	1	6	3

Second round
10	(Sweden) C Lindqvist	6	6
(Belgium) A Devries	2	3
(France) M-C Calleja	4	6	6
(Netherlands) M Bollegraf	6	4	3
(Switzerland) C Bartos-Cserepy	6	6
WC	(Australia) A Scott	3	0
Q	(Japan) Y Koizumi	4	1
6	(Bulgaria) M Maleeva	6	6

Third round
10	(Sweden) C Lindqvist	4	6	6
(France) M-C Calleja	6	1	3
(Switzerland) C Bartos-Cserepy	3	7^{7}	5
6	(Bulgaria) M Maleeva	6	6^{5}	7

Fourth round
10	(Sweden) C Lindqvist	6	6
6	(Bulgaria) M Maleeva	3	3

=== Bottom half ===
==== Section 5 ====
First round
(Czechoslovakia) M Pazderová	1	4
Q	(West Germany) C Singer	6	6
(United States) M Van Nostrand	1	3
(United States) T Mochizuki	6	6
(West Germany) S Hanika	7	5	10
Q	(Netherlands) M van der Torre	5	7	8
(Japan) E Inoue	6	7^{7}
(South Africa) D Van Rensburg	3	6^{3}

Second round
5	(West Germany) C Kohde-Kilsch	6	6
(Australia) N Provis	2	2
(West Germany) C Singer	3	3
(United States) T Mochizuki	6	6
(West Germany) S Hanika	6	6
(Japan) E Inoue	4	4
(Japan) A Kijimuta	6	4	6
13	(United States) T Phelps	3	6	0

Third round
5	(West Germany) C Kohde-Kilsch	6	6
(United States) T Mochizuki	2	2
(West Germany) S Hanika	6	6
(Japan) A Kijimuta	3	3

Fourth round
5	(West Germany) C Kohde-Kilsch	6	6
(West Germany) S Hanika	3	1

==== Section 6 ====
First round
(United States) T Holladay	2	6^{1}
Q	(New Zealand) B Cordwell	6	7^{7}
(Australia) A Minter	4	4
(Hong Kong) P Hy	6	6
(United States) B Nagelsen	6	6^{6}	6
(United States) L Antonoplis	2	7^{8}	1
WC	(Australia) M Jaggard	6^{6}	6	0
(United States) N Hu	7^{8}	2	6

Second round
9	(United States) R White	6	6
Q	(New Zealand) B Cordwell	1	4
(Australia) E Smylie	6	6
(Hong Kong) P Hy	2	3
(Switzerland) C Jolissaint	6	1	6
(United States) B Nagelsen	4	6	3
(United States) N Hu	4	6^{6}
4	(Czechoslovakia) H Suková	6	7^{8}

Third round
9	(United States) R White	1	2
(Australia) E Smylie	6	6
(Switzerland) C Jolissaint	2	1
4	(Czechoslovakia) H Suková	6	6

Fourth round
(Australia) E Smylie	7	3	7
4	(Czechoslovakia) H Suková	5	6	5

==== Section 7 ====
First round
(United States) G Fernández	6	6
WC	(Australia) S McCann	4	3
(Peru) P Vásquez	4	2
(United States) M Werdel	6	6
(United States) A-M Fernandez	0	r
(United Kingdom) A Hobbs	3
(United Kingdom) S Gomer	4	6	8
(West Germany) A Betzner	6	2	6

Second round
8	(United States) L McNeil	6	6
(United States) E Burgin	3	4
(United States) G Fernández	2	3
(United States) M Werdel	6	6
(United Kingdom) A Hobbs	6	6
(United Kingdom) S Gomer	2	3
(United States) G Rush	3	6	2
15	(Australia) D Balestrat	6	4	6

Third round
8	(United States) L McNeil	6	7
(United States) M Werdel	2	5
(United Kingdom) A Hobbs	6	6
15	(Australia) D Balestrat	4	2

Fourth round
8	(United States) L McNeil	7^{7}	6
(United Kingdom) A Hobbs	6^{4}	3

==== Section 8 ====
First round
WC	(Australia) M Bowrey	1	4
(West Germany) W Probst	6	6
Q	(United States) S Collins	1	6	4
(Czechoslovakia) A Holíková	6	4	6
LL	(France) V Paquet	5	3
(United States) A Smith	7	6
WC	(Australia) M Turk	1	3
(New Zealand) J Richardson	6	6

Second round
12	(Canada) C Bassett	6	6
Q	(United Kingdom) J Salmon	1	1
(West Germany) W Probst	7	4	6
(Czechoslovakia) A Holíková	5	6	8
(United States) K Keil	2	4
(United States) A Smith	6	6
(New Zealand) J Richardson	6	2	2
2	(Czechoslovakia) H Mandlíková	4	6	6

Third round
12	(Canada) C Bassett	6	7^{7}
(Czechoslovakia) A Holíková	1	6^{2}
(United States) A Smith	3	2
2	(Czechoslovakia) H Mandlíková	6	6

Fourth round
12	(Canada) C Bassett	2	6	2
2	(Czechoslovakia) H Mandlíková	6	4	6
