= 1987 Australian Open – Women's doubles =

Women's doubles
- 1987 Australian Open

Final
- Champions: (United States) Martina Navratilova (United States) Pam Shriver
- Runners-up: (United States) Zina Garrison (United States) Lori McNeil
- Score: 6–1, 6–0

Details
- Draw: 32
- Seeds: 8

Events
Singles	men	women		boys	girls
Doubles	men	women	mixed	boys	girls
WC Singles	men	women	quad
WC Doubles	men	women	quad
Legends	men	women	mixed
- Australian Open

Four-time defending champions Martina Navratilova and Pam Shriver successfully defended their title, defeating Zina Garrison and Lori McNeil in the final, 6–1, 6–0 to win the women's doubles tennis title at the 1987 Australian Open.

== Seeds ==
1. (United States) Martina Navratilova / (United States) Pam Shriver (champions)
2. (West Germany) Claudia Kohde-Kilsch / (Czechoslovakia) Helena Suková (semifinals)
3. (Czechoslovakia) Hana Mandlíková / (Australia) Wendy Turnbull (quarterfinals)
4. (United States) Betsy Nagelsen / (Australia) Elizabeth Smylie (first round)
5. (United States) Elise Burgin / (South Africa) Rosalyn Fairbank (first round)
6. (United States) Gigi Fernández / (United States) Robin White (second round)
7. (United States) Zina Garrison / (United States) Lori McNeil (final)
8. (United Kingdom) Jo Durie / (United Kingdom) Anne Hobbs (quarterfinals)

== Draw ==
Key

- Q = Qualifier
- WC = Wild card
- LL = Lucky loser
- Alt = Alternate
- ITF = ITF entry
- PR = Protected ranking
- SR = Special ranking
- SE = Special exempt
- JE = Junior exempt
- JR = Junior Accelerator Programme entrant
- CO = College Accelerator Programme entrant
- NG = Next Gen Accelerator Program entrant
- w/o = Walkover
- r = Retired
- d = Defaulted

=== Finals ===
Semifinals
1	(United States) Martina Navratilova (United States) Pam Shriver	6	6
Q	(Hong Kong) Patricia Hy (Japan) Etsuko Inoue	1	0
7	(United States) Zina Garrison (United States) Lori McNeil	7^{7}	7^{7}
2	(Germany) Claudia Kohde-Kilsch (Czechoslovakia) Helena Suková	6^{1}	6^{4}

Final
1	(United States) Martina Navratilova (United States) Pam Shriver	6	6
7	(United States) Zina Garrison (United States) Lori McNeil	1	0

=== Top half ===
First round
1	(United States) M Navratilova (United States) P Shriver	6	6
(United States) T Holladay (United States) P Smith	1	3
(South Africa) J Mundel (United States) G Rush	6	7^{9}
(Netherlands) M Bollegraf (Canada) H Kelesi	1	6^{7}
WC	(Australia) A Minter (Australia) E Minter	2	1
(New Zealand) B Cordwell (Australia) L Field	6	6
(United States) Ca MacGregor (United States) Cy MacGregor	6^{5}	3
8	(United Kingdom) J Durie (United Kingdom) A Hobbs	7^{7}	6
4	(United States) B Nagelsen (Australia) E Smylie	3	2
LL	(West Germany) C Porwik (West Germany) M Schropp	6	6
(Sweden) C Lindqvist (West Germany) E Pfaff	6	6
Q	(Hungary) C Bartos (United Kingdom) S Gomer	1	2
(Switzerland) C Jolissaint (United States) H Ludloff	3	6	14
(United States) H Na (Japan) M Yanagi	6	3	12
Q	(Hong Kong) P Hy (Japan) E Inoue	6	6
5	(United States) E Burgin (South Africa) R Fairbank	3	3

Second round
1	(United States) M Navratilova (United States) P Shriver	6	7
(South Africa) J Mundel (United States) G Rush	1	5
(New Zealand) B Cordwell (Australia) L Field	6^{9}	5
8	(United Kingdom) J Durie (United Kingdom) A Hobbs	7^{11}	7
LL	(West Germany) C Porwik (West Germany) M Schropp	2	2
(Sweden) C Lindqvist (West Germany) E Pfaff	6	6
(Switzerland) C Jolissaint (United States) H Ludloff	5	3
Q	(Hong Kong) P Hy (Japan) E Inoue	7	6

Quarterfinals
1	(United States) M Navratilova (United States) P Shriver	6	7
8	(United Kingdom) J Durie (United Kingdom) A Hobbs	4	5
(Sweden) C Lindqvist (West Germany) E Pfaff	5	4
Q	(Hong Kong) P Hy (Japan) E Inoue	7	6

Semifinals
1	(United States) M Navratilova (United States) P Shriver	6	6
Q	(Hong Kong) P Hy (Japan) E Inoue	1	0

=== Bottom half ===
First round
7	(United States) Z Garrison (United States) L McNeil	6	6
(Netherlands) C Bakkum (Netherlands) M van der Torre	2	1
(Australia) J Byrne (Australia) J Tremelling	6	5	6
WC	(Australia) R Bryant (Australia) A Tobin-Dingwall	4	7	2
(United States) B Gerken (United States) T Phelps	7	7^{8}
(United States) L Antonoplis (Brazil) C Monteiro	5	6^{6}
(United States) C Benjamin (South Africa) D van Rensburg	3	3
3	(Czechoslovakia) H Mandlíková (Australia) W Turnbull	6	6
6	(United States) G Fernández (United States) R White	6	6^{6}	8
(United States) A Moulton (United States) M Van Nostrand	1	7^{8}	6
(Australia) D Balestrat (Czechoslovakia) R Maršíková	1	4
(United States) S Collins (United States) S Walsh-Pete	6	6
(United States) L Allen (South Africa) E Reinach	6	6
(Czechoslovakia) A Holíková (West Germany) W Probst	2	3
(United States) A Henricksson (Sweden) C Karlsson	2	1
2	(West Germany) C Kohde-Kilsch (Czechoslovakia) H Suková	6	6

Second round
7	(United States) Z Garrison (United States) L McNeil	6	6
(Australia) J Byrne (Australia) J Tremelling	2	1
(United States) B Gerken (United States) T Phelps	3	1
3	(Czechoslovakia) H Mandlíková (Australia) W Turnbull	6	6
6	(United States) G Fernández (United States) R White	4	6	2
(United States) S Collins (United States) S Walsh-Pete	6	2	6
(United States) L Allen (South Africa) E Reinach	1	2
2	(West Germany) C Kohde-Kilsch (Czechoslovakia) H Suková	6	6

Quarterfinals
7	(United States) Z Garrison (United States) L McNeil	3	6	8
3	(Czechoslovakia) H Mandlíková (Australia) W Turnbull	6	3	6
(United States) S Collins (United States) S Walsh-Pete	5	0
2	(West Germany) C Kohde-Kilsch (Czechoslovakia) H Suková	7	6

Semifinals
7	(United States) Z Garrison (United States) L McNeil	7^{7}	7^{7}
2	(West Germany) C Kohde-Kilsch (Czechoslovakia) H Suková	6^{1}	6^{4}
