= 1987 Australian Open – Men's singles =

Men's singles
- 1987 Australian Open

Final
- Champion: (Sweden) Stefan Edberg
- Runner-up: (Australia) Pat Cash
- Score: 6–3, 6–4, 3–6, 5–7, 6–3

Details
- Draw: 96
- Seeds: 16

Events
Singles	men	women		boys	girls
Doubles	men	women	mixed	boys	girls
WC Singles	men	women	quad
WC Doubles	men	women	quad
Legends	men	women	mixed
- Australian Open

Defending champion Stefan Edberg defeated Pat Cash in the final, 6–3, 6–4, 3–6, 5–7, 6–3 to win the men's singles tennis title at the 1987 Australian Open. It was his second major singles title.

There was no Australian Open in 1986, due to the administrative changes to make the tournament the opening major of the year (as it had been before 1977). The 1987 championship therefore followed the 1985 tournament, held over a year earlier.

This was the last edition of the tournament to be held on grass courts, as it would switch to hardcourts the following year.

== Seeds ==
All seeds receive a bye into the second round.

1. (Czechoslovakia) Ivan Lendl (semifinals)
2. (West Germany) Boris Becker (fourth round)
3. (France) Yannick Noah (quarterfinals)
4. (Sweden) Stefan Edberg (champion)
5. (France) Henri Leconte (third round)
6. (Czechoslovakia) Miloslav Mečíř (quarterfinals)
7. (United States) Brad Gilbert (third round)
8. (United States) Kevin Curren (third round)
9. (Sweden) Anders Järryd (quarterfinals)
10. (United States) Johan Kriek (second round)
11. (Australia) Pat Cash (final)
12. (Czechoslovakia) Milan Šrejber (second round)
13. (United States) Robert Seguso (fourth round)
14. (United States) Tim Wilkison (fourth round)
15. (Switzerland) Jakob Hlasek (second round)
16. (India) Ramesh Krishnan (third round)

== Draw ==
Key

- Q = Qualifier
- WC = Wild card
- LL = Lucky loser
- Alt = Alternate
- ITF = ITF entry
- PR = Protected ranking
- SR = Special ranking
- SE = Special exempt
- JE = Junior exempt
- JR = Junior Accelerator Programme entrant
- CO = College Accelerator Programme entrant
- NG = Next Gen Accelerator Program entrant
- w/o = Walkover
- r = Retired
- d = Defaulted

=== Finals ===
Quarterfinals
1	(Czechoslovakia) Ivan Lendl	7	6	6
9	(Sweden) Anders Järryd	6	1	3
3	(France) Yannick Noah	4	2	6	0
11	(Australia) Pat Cash	6	6	2	6
6	(Czechoslovakia) Miloslav Mečíř	1	4	4
4	(Sweden) Stefan Edberg	6	6	6
(New Zealand) Kelly Evernden	3	5	4
(Australia) Wally Masur	6	7	6

Semifinals
1	(Czechoslovakia) Ivan Lendl	6	7	6	4
11	(Australia) Pat Cash	7	5	7	6
4	(Sweden) Stefan Edberg	6	6	7
(Australia) Wally Masur	2	4	6

Final
11	(Australia) Pat Cash	3	4	6	7	3
4	(Sweden) Stefan Edberg	6	6	3	5	6

=== Top half ===
==== Section 1 ====
First round
Q	(United States) D Saltz	6	6	6
(West Germany) P Kühnen	4	3	3
(United States) M Freeman	4	0	r
(United States) M Anger	6	1
(New Zealand) R Simpson	7	6	6	7
(United States) G Donnelly	6	7	3	6
(United States) M De Palmer	6	4	6	1	2
(United States) D Goldie	1	6	1	6	6

Second round
1	(Czechoslovakia) I Lendl	6	3	6	6
Q	(United States) D Saltz	4	6	1	1
(United States) M Anger	7	6	3	6
(Israel) A Mansdorf	6	3	6	3
(New Zealand) R Simpson	3	6	6
(United States) D Goldie	6	7	7
(South Africa) E Edwards	6	7	1	3	3
16	(India) R Krishnan	4	5	6	6	6

Third round
1	(Czechoslovakia) I Lendl	6	6	6	6
(United States) M Anger	4	2	7	2
(United States) D Goldie	3	7	6	6	6
16	(India) R Krishnan	6	5	7	2	2

Fourth round
1	(Czechoslovakia) I Lendl	2	6	7	6
(United States) D Goldie	6	4	6	3

==== Section 2 ====
First round
(Sweden) J Carlsson	4	7	6	7
Q	(West Germany) C Saceanu	6	6	3	6
(New Zealand) B Derlin	6	7	3	7	6
(United Kingdom) A Castle	7	5	6	5	1
WC	(Australia) D Tyson	6	6	1
(Australia) P Doohan	7	7	6
WC	(Australia) A Lane	7	6	3	2	2
(United States) B Scanlon	6	3	6	6	6

Second round
9	(Sweden) A Järryd	6	7	6
(Sweden) J Carlsson	0	5	0
(New Zealand) B Derlin	1	0	r
(France) T Champion	6	3
(Australia) P Doohan	6	1	7	7
(United States) B Scanlon	3	6	5	6
(Australia) J Fitzgerald	5	2	7	6	3
8	(United States) K Curren	7	6	6	4	6

Third round
9	(Sweden) A Järryd	6	7	2	6
(France) T Champion	0	6	6	2
(Australia) P Doohan	4	6	6	6
8	(United States) K Curren	6	3	4	4

Fourth round
9	(Sweden) A Järryd	6	6	6	7
(Australia) P Doohan	1	7	4	6

==== Section 3 ====
First round
(United States) B Schultz	7	6	3	7
(New Zealand) S Guy	5	2	6	6
(Australia) P McNamara	6	4	6	6	4
(United States) S Davis	7	6	2	3	6
(Netherlands) H van Boeckel	3	4	5
Q	(United Kingdom) N Fulwood	6	6	7
(Australia) D Cahill	3	4	4
WC	(Australia) S Barr	6	6	6

Second round
3	(France) Y Noah	4	6	6	6
Q	(Australia) D Macpherson	6	1	4	3
(United States) B Schultz	4	6	6	6	6
(United States) S Davis	6	1	7	2	3
(Australia) M Edmondson	6	4	4	7	9
Q	(United Kingdom) N Fulwood	4	6	6	5	7
WC	(Australia) S Barr	2	2	6	6
14	(United States) T Wilkison	6	6	3	7

Third round
3	(France) Y Noah	7	4	4	7	6
(United States) B Schultz	6	6	6	6	4
(Australia) M Edmondson	2	1	6
14	(United States) T Wilkison	6	6	7

Fourth round
3	(France) Y Noah	4	4	6	6	6
14	(United States) T Wilkison	6	6	3	4	2

==== Section 4 ====
First round
(Italy) C Pistolesi	5	2	6	7	9
(South Africa) M Robertson	7	6	3	6	7
(Netherlands) M Schapers	6	6	6
(United States) J Levine	1	4	4
(United States) P Annacone	7	7	6
(Nigeria) T Mmoh	6	6	4
(United States) T Nelson	6	6	6
(Canada) G Connell	4	4	4

Second round
11	(Australia) P Cash	7	2	7	6
(Italy) C Pistolesi	5	6	6	2
(Netherlands) M Schapers	6	1	4
(United States) B Testerman	7	6	6
(United States) P Annacone	6	4	6	6	6
Q	(Australia) S Wood	7	6	3	2	4
(United States) T Nelson	6	6	2	3
5	(France) H Leconte	4	7	6	6

Third round
11	(Australia) P Cash	6	6	6	6
(United States) B Testerman	3	7	1	2
(United States) P Annacone	1	4	6	6	10
5	(France) H Leconte	6	6	3	4	8

Fourth round
11	(Australia) P Cash	6	6	6	1	6
(United States) P Annacone	4	1	7	6	2

=== Bottom half ===
==== Section 5 ====
First round
(Australia) M Woodforde	6	6	6
Q	(Australia) M Baroch	3	4	4
Q	(South Africa) G Muller	6	6	6	6
Q	(United States) S Denton	7	3	4	4
Q	(Australia) C Eagle	6	4	6
(United States) M Davis	7	6	7
(Australia) M Kratzmann	7	4	7	6
(United States) J Lapidus	6	6	6	4

Second round
6	(Czechoslovakia) M Mečíř	4	6	6	6
(United Kingdom) J Bates	6	2	1	3
(Australia) M Woodforde	5	7	6	6	4
Q	(South Africa) G Muller	7	5	4	7	6
(United States) M Davis	4	2	4
(Australia) M Kratzmann	6	6	6
Q	(United States) K Flach	3	2	7	6	6
12	(Czechoslovakia) M Šrejber	6	6	5	3	3

Third round
6	(Czechoslovakia) M Mečíř	6	6	6
Q	(South Africa) G Muller	4	4	4
(Australia) M Kratzmann	6	6	6
Q	(United States) K Flach	4	2	3

Fourth round
6	(Czechoslovakia) M Mečíř	6	6	6
(Australia) M Kratzmann	4	2	2

==== Section 6 ====
First round
(Canada) G Michibata	3	7	4	4
(Argentina) J Frana	6	5	6	6
WC	(Australia) S Youl	4	3	6
(West Germany) A Maurer	6	6	7
(Sweden) P Carlsson	6	1	6	6
WC	(Australia) J Stoltenberg	3	6	3	2
(Israel) G Bloom	6	5	4	1
Q	(United States) J Letts	4	7	6	6

Second round
13	(United States) R Seguso	6	3	7	6
(United States) B Green	3	6	6	4
(Argentina) J Frana	2	7	6	6
(West Germany) A Maurer	6	5	3	4
(Australia) J Frawley	6	6	3
(Sweden) P Carlsson	2	3	2	r
Q	(United States) J Letts	6	1	0	2
4	(Sweden) S Edberg	3	6	6	6

Third round
13	(United States) R Seguso	6	3	7	6
(Argentina) J Frana	3	6	6	4
(Australia) J Frawley	4	3	1
4	(Sweden) S Edberg	6	6	6

Fourth round
13	(United States) R Seguso	1	0	1
4	(Sweden) S Edberg	6	6	6

==== Section 7 ====
First round
(Australia) B Drewett	6	3	6	6
(Australia) P McNamee	4	6	4	2
(Nigeria) N Odizor	5	2	3
(United States) D Rostagno	7	6	6
(United States) L Shiras	6	2	3	6
(South Africa) D Visser	4	6	6	7
(New Zealand) K Evernden	7	6	6
(United States) J Canter	6	3	4

Second round
7	(United States) B Gilbert	7	6	6
(Australia) B Drewett	5	3	2
(United States) D Rostagno	7	6	6
(United States) R Matuszewski	5	1	1
(United States) B Pearce	3	7	6	4	12
(South Africa) D Visser	6	6	3	6	10
(New Zealand) K Evernden	6	2	6	6
10	(United States) J Kriek	2	6	4	4

Third round
7	(United States) B Gilbert	6	2	3	1
(United States) D Rostagno	4	6	6	6
(United States) B Pearce	2	2	4
(New Zealand) K Evernden	6	6	6

Fourth round
(United States) D Rostagno	7	2	4	7	5
(New Zealand) K Evernden	6	6	6	5	7

==== Section 8 ====
First round
(South Africa) C van Rensburg	6	6	0	6
(Mexico) L Lavalle	3	4	6	4
(United States) J Sadri	3	7	4	0
(Australia) W Masur	6	6	6	6
Q	(Australia) L Warder	7	6	3	4	1
(Socialist Federal Republic of Yugoslavia) S Živojinović	6	3	6	6	6
(Argentina) C Miniussi	2	1	5
(Australia) B Dyke	6	6	7

Second round
15	(Switzerland) J Hlasek	6	3	3	7	4
(South Africa) C van Rensburg	4	6	6	6	6
(Australia) W Masur	6	6	6	6
(United States) K Jones	7	2	0	4
(Australia) C Limberger	1	4	2
(Socialist Federal Republic of Yugoslavia) S Živojinović	6	6	6
(Australia) B Dyke	7	1	4	7	2
2	(West Germany) B Becker	6	6	6	6	6

Third round
(South Africa) C van Rensburg	3	6	5	6	0
(Australia) W Masur	6	1	7	4	6
(Socialist Federal Republic of Yugoslavia) S Živojinović	3	3	6	3
2	(West Germany) B Becker	6	6	3	6

Fourth round
(Australia) W Masur	4	7	6	6	6
2	(West Germany) B Becker	6	6	4	7	2

Preceded by 1986 US Open	Grand Slam men's singles	Succeeded by 1987 French Open
