= 1987 Australian Open =

- Date: 12–25 January 1987
- Edition: 75th
- Category: Grand Slam (ITF)
- Surface: Grass
- Location: Melbourne, Australia
- Venue: Kooyong Lawn Tennis Club

Champions

Men's singles
- (Sweden) Stefan Edberg

Women's singles
- (Czechoslovakia) Hana Mandlíková

Men's doubles
- (Sweden) Stefan Edberg / (Sweden) Anders Järryd

Women's doubles
- (United States) Martina Navratilova / (United States) Pam Shriver

Mixed doubles
- (United States) Zina Garrison / (United States) Sherwood Stewart

Boys' singles
- (Australia) Jason Stoltenberg

Girls' singles
- (Australia) Michelle Jaggard

Boys' doubles
- (Australia) Jason Stoltenberg / (Australia) Todd Woodbridge

Girls' doubles
- (Belgium) Ann Devries / (Australia) Nicole Provis
- Australian Open

The 1987 Australian Open was a tennis tournament played on grass courts at the Kooyong Stadium in Melbourne in Victoria in Australia. It was the 75th edition of the Australian Open and was held from 12 through 25 January 1987; the first tournament to be held after New Year's Day since 1970 and also the last tournament to be played on grass before the change of surface.

== Change of schedule ==
It was decided that the Australian Open would be moved from the month of December to the month of January. This meant the tournament was not held in December 1986 but in January 1987.

== Seniors ==
=== Men's singles ===
(Sweden) Stefan Edberg defeated (Australia) Pat Cash 6–3, 6–4, 3–6, 5–7, 6–3

- It was Edberg's 2nd career Grand Slam title and his 2nd Australian Open title.

=== Women's singles ===
(Czechoslovakia) Hana Mandlíková defeated (United States) Martina Navratilova 7–5, 7–6^{(7–1)}

- It was Mandlíková's 4th career Grand Slam title and her 2nd and last Australian Open title.

=== Men's doubles ===
(Sweden) Stefan Edberg / (Sweden) Anders Järryd defeated (Australia) Peter Doohan / (Australia) Laurie Warder 6–4, 6–4, 7–6^{(7–3)}

- It was Edberg's 3rd career Grand Slam title and his 3rd Australian Open title. It was Järryd's 2nd career Grand Slam title and his only Australian Open title.

=== Women's doubles ===
(United States) Martina Navratilova / (United States) Pam Shriver defeated (United States) Zina Garrison / (United States) Lori McNeil 6–1, 6–0

- It was Navratilova's 43rd career Grand Slam title and her 9th Australian Open title. It was Shriver's 15th career Grand Slam title and her 6th Australian Open title.

=== Mixed doubles ===
(United States) Zina Garrison / (United States) Sherwood Stewart defeated (United Kingdom) Anne Hobbs / (United Kingdom) Andrew Castle 3–6, 7–6^{(7–5)}, 6–3

- It was Garrison's 1st career Grand Slam title and her only Australian Open title. It was Stewart's 4th career Grand Slam title and his 2nd and last Australian Open title.

== Juniors ==
=== Boys' singles ===
(Australia) Jason Stoltenberg defeated (Australia) Todd Woodbridge 6–2, 7–6

=== Girls' singles ===
(Australia) Michelle Jaggard defeated (Australia) Nicole Provis 6–2, 6–4

=== Boys' doubles ===
(Australia) Jason Stoltenberg / (Australia) Todd Woodbridge defeated (Australia) Shane Barr / (Australia) Bryan Roe 6–2, 6–4

=== Girls' doubles ===
(Belgium) Ann Devries / (Australia) Nicole Provis defeated (Australia) Genevieve Dwyer / (Australia) Danielle Jones 6–3, 6–1

== Prize money ==
Event		W	F	SF	QF	4R	3R	2R	1R
Singles	Men	A$103,875	A$51,938	A$25,959	A$13,336	A$7,171	A$4,172	A$2,607	A$1,690
Singles	Women	A$115,000	A$55,000	A$27,000	A$13,500	A$6,775	A$3,700	A$1,900	A$950

Total prize money for the event was A$1,372,375.

Preceded by 1986 US Open	Grand Slams	Succeeded by 1987 French Open
