= 1988 Australian Open – Men's singles qualifying =

Men's singles qualifying
- 1988 Australian Open

Events
Singles	men	women		boys	girls
Doubles	men	women	mixed	boys	girls
WC Singles	men	women	quad
WC Doubles	men	women	quad
Legends	men	women	mixed

Qualification
Singles	men	women
- Australian Open

This article displays the qualifying draw for men's singles at the 1988 Australian Open.

== Seeds ==
1. (New Zealand) Steve Guy (qualified)
2. (Japan) Shuzo Matsuoka (qualified)
3. (Australia) Peter Carter (qualifying competition, lucky loser)
4. (South Africa) Christo Steyn (qualifying competition, lucky loser)
5. (Italy) Omar Camporese (qualified)
6. (United States) Richard Schmidt (qualified)
7. (United Kingdom) Nick Fulwood (qualifying competition)
8. (South Korea) Kim Bong-soo (qualified)
9. (Australia) Charlton Eagle (qualified)
10. (Australia) Laurie Warder (qualifying competition)
11. (United States) Chris Kennedy (qualified)
12. (West Germany) Ivo Werner (qualified)
13. (United Kingdom) Chris Bailey (qualified)
14. (Australia) Anthony Lane (qualified)
15. (United States) Dexter MacBride (qualifying competition)
16. (West Germany) Torben Theine (qualified)
17. (New Zealand) David Lewis (qualifying competition)
18. (United States) John Letts (qualified)
19. (Australia) David Macpherson (qualifying competition)
20. (United States) Peter Palandjian (qualifying competition)
21. (Australia) Richard Fricker (first round)
22. (Australia) Gavin Pfitzner (qualifying competition)
23. (United Kingdom) David Felgate (qualified)
24. (Japan) Hitoshi Shirato (first round)
25. (Australia) Bryan Roe (qualified)
26. (United States) Bob Green (qualifying competition)
27. (Australia) Antony Emerson (qualifying competition)
28. (Australia) Jason Carriage (qualifying competition)
29. (Australia) Russell Barlow (qualified)
30. (United States) Hank Pfister (qualified)
31. (Australia) Neil Borwick (qualifying competition)
32. (Australia) Marcus Smith (first round)

== Qualifiers ==
1. (New Zealand) Steve Guy
2. (Japan) Shuzo Matsuoka
3. (Australia) Russell Barlow
4. (United States) Hank Pfister
5. (Italy) Omar Camporese
6. (United States) Richard Schmidt
7. (Australia) Bryan Roe
8. (South Korea) Kim Bong-soo
9. (Australia) Charlton Eagle
10. (United Kingdom) David Felgate
11. (United States) Chris Kennedy
12. (West Germany) Ivo Werner
13. (United Kingdom) Chris Bailey
14. (Australia) Anthony Lane
15. (United States) John Letts
16. (West Germany) Torben Theine

== Lucky losers ==
1. (Australia) Peter Carter
2. (South Africa) Christo Steyn

== Qualifying draw ==
Key

- Q = Qualifier
- WC = Wild card
- LL = Lucky loser
- Alt = Alternate
- ITF = ITF entry
- PR = Protected ranking
- SR = Special ranking
- SE = Special exempt
- JE = Junior exempt
- JR = Junior Accelerator Programme entrant
- CO = College Accelerator Programme entrant
- NG = Next Gen Accelerator Program entrant
- w/o = Walkover
- r = Retired
- d = Defaulted

=== First qualifier ===
First round				Qualifying competition
				1	(New Zealand) Steve Guy	6	6
					(Australia) Dane Nebel	3	2
	(Australia) Dane Nebel	6	6		(Australia) Dane Nebel	3	2
32	(Australia) Marcus Smith	4	0

=== Second qualifier ===
First round				Qualifying competition
				2	(Japan) Shuzo Matsuoka	7	6
				31	(Australia) Neil Borwick	6	2
WC	(Italy) Massimo Boscatto	5	0	31	(Australia) Neil Borwick	6	2
31	(Australia) Neil Borwick	7	6

=== Third qualifier ===
First round				Qualifying competition
				3	(Australia) Peter Carter	4	4
				29	(Australia) Russell Barlow	6	6
	(Australia) John Marinov	3	1	29	(Australia) Russell Barlow	6	6
29	(Australia) Russell Barlow	6	6

=== Fourth qualifier ===
First round
4	(South Africa) Christo Steyn	6	6
(Australia) Darren Cole	2	3
WC	(Australia) Darren Frlan	0	6
30	(United States) Hank Pfister	6	7

Qualifying competition
4	(South Africa) Christo Steyn	5	6	3
30	(United States) Hank Pfister	7	4	6

=== Fifth qualifier ===
First round
5	(Italy) Omar Camporese	2	6	6
(Australia) Peter Della Vedova	6	1	3
WC	(Italy) Massimo Ardinghi	3	3
28	(Australia) Jason Carriage	6	6

Qualifying competition
5	(Italy) Omar Camporese	6	6
28	(Australia) Jason Carriage	4	4

=== Sixth qualifier ===
First round
6	(United States) Richard Schmidt	6	7
WC	(Australia) Glen Kellett	4	6
(Australia) Paul Lord	5	4
27	(Australia) Antony Emerson	7	6

Qualifying competition
6	(United States) Richard Schmidt	6	7
27	(Australia) Antony Emerson	3	5

=== Seventh qualifier ===
First round
7	(United Kingdom) Nick Fulwood	3	6	6
(Australia) Jamie Morgan	6	3	4
WC	(Australia) Craig Dungey	3	1
25	(Australia) Bryan Roe	6	6

Qualifying competition
7	(United Kingdom) Nick Fulwood	6	4
25	(Australia) Bryan Roe	7	6

=== Eighth qualifier ===
First round
8	(South Korea) Kim Bong-soo	6	6
(Australia) Peter Thrupp	3	3
WC	(Australia) Richard Cahill	w/o
26	(United States) Bob Green

Qualifying competition
8	(South Korea) Kim Bong-soo	6	6
26	(United States) Bob Green	2	4

=== Ninth qualifier ===
First round
9	(Australia) Charlton Eagle	3	6	6
(Australia) Andrew Ritter	6	1	2
(Australia) Mike Baroch	4	6	6
24	(Japan) Hitoshi Shirato	6	4	3

Qualifying competition
9	(Australia) Charlton Eagle	6	6
(Australia) Mike Baroch	1	4

=== Tenth qualifier ===
First round
10	(Australia) Laurie Warder	6	1	11
(Australia) Andrew Florent	2	6	9
(West Germany) Stefan Heckmanns	6	5
23	(United Kingdom) David Felgate	7	7

Qualifying competition
10	(Australia) Laurie Warder	6	4	3
23	(United Kingdom) David Felgate	4	6	6

=== Eleventh qualifier ===
First round
11	(United States) Chris Kennedy	6	6	6
(Australia) Steve Wood	7	2	2
(Australia) Paul Kronk	4	6	6
21	(Australia) Richard Fricker	6	3	3

Qualifying competition
11	(United States) Chris Kennedy	6	6
(Australia) Paul Kronk	0	1

=== Twelfth qualifier ===
First round
12	(West Germany) Ivo Werner	6	6
WC	(Australia) John Arbanas	4	3
(Australia) Andrew McLean	2	1
22	(Australia) Gavin Pfitzner	6	6

Qualifying competition
12	(West Germany) Ivo Werner	7	6
22	(Australia) Gavin Pfitzner	6	3

=== Thirteenth qualifier ===
First round
13	(United Kingdom) Chris Bailey	6	6
(Australia) Glen Eaton	3	0
(Australia) Jon Ireland	5	1
19	(Australia) David Macpherson	7	6

Qualifying competition
13	(United Kingdom) Chris Bailey	6	6
19	(Australia) David Macpherson	3	3

=== Fourteenth qualifier ===
First round
14	(Australia) Anthony Lane	6	6
(Australia) Jason Cask	2	1
WC	(Australia) Ron Woodbridge	3	5
20	(United States) Peter Palandjian	6	7

Qualifying competition
14	(Australia) Anthony Lane	7	6
20	(United States) Peter Palandjian	6	2

=== Fifteenth qualifier ===
First round
15	(United States) Dexter MacBride	6	6
(United States) Brett Buffington	3	2
(Australia) Paul Mick	4	3
18	(United States) John Letts	6	6

Qualifying competition
15	(United States) Dexter MacBride	0	6
18	(United States) John Letts	6	7

=== Sixteenth qualifier ===
First round
16	(West Germany) Torben Theine	6	4	6
WC	(Italy) Cristian Brandi	1	6	0
(United States) Craig D. Miller	2	5
17	(New Zealand) David Lewis	6	7

Qualifying competition
16	(West Germany) Torben Theine	6	6
17	(New Zealand) David Lewis	2	0
