= 1988 Australian Open – Men's doubles =

Tennis tournament

Men's doubles
- 1988 Australian Open

Final
- Champion: (United States) Rick Leach (United States) Jim Pugh
- Runner-up: (United Kingdom) Jeremy Bates (Sweden) Peter Lundgren
- Score: 6–3, 6–2, 6–3

Details
- Draw: 64
- Seeds: 16

Events
Singles	men	women		boys	girls
Doubles	men	women	mixed	boys	girls
WC Singles	men	women	quad
WC Doubles	men	women	quad
Legends	men	women	mixed
- Australian Open

The men's doubles tournament at the 1988 Australian Open was held from 11 through 24 January 1988 on the outdoor hard courts at the Flinders Park in Melbourne, Australia. Rick Leach and Jim Pugh won the title, defeating Jeremy Bates and Peter Lundgren in the final.

== Seeds ==
1. (United States) Paul Annacone / (South Africa) Christo van Rensburg (third round)
2. (France) Guy Forget / (Socialist Federal Republic of Yugoslavia) Slobodan Živojinović (third round)
3. (Australia) John Fitzgerald / (Sweden) Anders Järryd (quarterfinals)
4. (Australia) Peter Doohan / (Australia) Laurie Warder (first round)
5. (United States) Rick Leach / (United States) Jim Pugh (champions)
6. (United States) Sammy Giammalva / (United States) Jim Grabb (first round)
7. (Australia) Darren Cahill / (Australia) Mark Kratzmann (third round)
8. (United States) Tim Wilkison / (United States) Todd Witsken (third round)
9. (Australia) Carl Limberger / (Australia) Mark Woodforde (second round)
10. (United States) Martin Davis / (Australia) Brad Drewett (semifinals)
11. (South Africa) Eddie Edwards / (South Africa) Gary Muller (third round)
12. (United States) Matt Anger / (United States) Tim Pawsat (first round)
13. (Australia) Broderick Dyke / (Australia) Wally Masur (first round)
14. (United States) Paul Chamberlin / (United States) Sherwood Stewart (third round)
15. (Sweden) Jonas Svensson / (Sweden) Magnus Tideman (quarterfinals)
16. (New Zealand) Kelly Evernden / (United States) Johan Kriek (quarterfinals)

== Draw ==
Key

- Q = Qualifier
- WC = Wild card
- LL = Lucky loser
- Alt = Alternate
- ITF = ITF entry
- PR = Protected ranking
- SR = Special ranking
- SE = Special exempt
- JE = Junior exempt
- JR = Junior Accelerator Programme entrant
- CO = College Accelerator Programme entrant
- NG = Next Gen Accelerator Program entrant
- w/o = Walkover
- r = Retired
- d = Defaulted

=== Finals ===
Quarterfinals
15	(Sweden) Jonas Svensson (Sweden) Magnus Tideman	3	7	6	3
10	(United States) Martin Davis (Australia) Brad Drewett	6	5	7	6
3	(Australia) John Fitzgerald (Sweden) Anders Järryd	6	3	6	3
5	(United States) Rick Leach (United States) Jim Pugh	7	6	3	6
(United Kingdom) Andrew Castle (Argentina) Roberto Saad	6	7	6	6	19
(Canada) Grant Connell (Canada) Glenn Michibata	7	6	7	3	17
(United Kingdom) Jeremy Bates (Sweden) Peter Lundgren	3	7	6	3	7
16	(New Zealand) Kelly Evernden (United States) Johan Kriek	6	6	2	6	5

Semifinals
10	(United States) Martin Davis (Australia) Brad Drewett	7	6	6	3
5	(United States) Rick Leach (United States) Jim Pugh	5	7	7	6
(United Kingdom) Andrew Castle (Argentina) Roberto Saad	7	4	6	3
(United Kingdom) Jeremy Bates (Sweden) Peter Lundgren	6	6	7	6

Final
5	(United States) Rick Leach (United States) Jim Pugh	6	6	6
(United Kingdom) Jeremy Bates (Sweden) Peter Lundgren	3	2	3

=== Top half ===
==== Section 1 ====
First round
1	(United States) P Annacone (South Africa) C van Rensburg	6	6
(Australia) R Fricker (Australia) G Pfitzner	1	4
(Australia) R Barlow (South Africa) B Moir	1	3
(New Zealand) B Derlin (New Zealand) S Guy	6	6
(United States) D Cassidy (United States) C Hooper	6	6	6
WC	(Australia) A Anderson (Australia) C Turich	7	4	3
(Australia) C Eagle (Japan) H Shirato	6	3
15	(Sweden) J Svenson (Sweden) M Tideman	7	6
10	(United States) M Davis (Australia) B Drewett	4	6	8
(United States) D Goldie (United States) L Scott	6	3	6
(Sweden) M Gustafsson (Sweden) N Kroon	4	6	8
(South Africa) C Steyn (South Africa) D Visser	6	3	6
Alt	(Australia) D Cole (Australia) P Kronk	5	4
(United States) M Bauer (Netherlands) T Nijssen	7	6
(Australia) R Cahill (Australia) P Mick	1	5
8	(United States) Ti Wilkison (United States) T Witsken	6	7

Second round
1	(United States) P Annacone (South Africa) C van Rensburg	6	6
(New Zealand) B Derlin (New Zealand) S Guy	2	4
(United States) D Cassidy (United States) C Hooper	6	5	1
15	(Sweden) J Svenson (Sweden) M Tideman	4	7	6
10	(United States) M Davis (Australia) B Drewett	6	6
(Sweden) M Gustafsson (Sweden) N Kroon	3	4
(United States) M Bauer (Netherlands) T Nijssen	2	4
8	(United States) Ti Wilkison (United States) T Witsken	6	6

Third round
1	(United States) P Annacone (South Africa) C van Rensburg	4	3
15	(Sweden) J Svenson (Sweden) M Tideman	6	6
10	(United States) M Davis (Australia) B Drewett	4	6	6
8	(United States) Ti Wilkison (United States) T Witsken	6	4	3

Quarterfinals
15	(Sweden) J Svenson (Sweden) M Tideman	6	5	7	6
10	(United States) M Davis (Australia) B Drewett	3	7	6	3

==== Section 2 ====
First round
3	(Australia) J Fitzgerald (Sweden) A Järryd	4	6	8
(West Germany) P Kühnen (West Germany) CU Steeb	6	4	6
(United States) K Jones (United States) T Nelson	3	6	6
(Netherlands) M Schapers (Netherlands) H van Boeckel	6	4	3
(Netherlands) M Oosting (West Germany) C Saceanu	5	4
(Australia) S Barr (Australia) K Warwick	7	6
(Switzerland) J Hlasek (Israel) A Mansdorf	4	6
14	(United States) P Chamberlin (United States) S Stewart	6	7
11	(South Africa) E Edwards (South Africa) G Muller	6	7
(United States) B Buffington (Sweden) S Svensson	3	6
(United States) M Flur (United States) J Rive	6	6
(West Germany) S Heckmanns (Australia) A Spartalis	4	3
(Australia) A Emerson (India) R Krishnan	6	6
(Australia) A Lane (Australia) R Rasheed	4	3
WC	(Australia) J Anderson (Australia) R Fromberg	2	2
5	(United States) R Leach (United States) J Pugh	6	6

Second round
3	(Australia) J Fitzgerald (Sweden) A Järryd	6	7
(United States) K Jones (United States) T Nelson	1	6
(Australia) S Barr (Australia) K Warwick	1	4
14	(United States) P Chamberlin (United States) S Stewart	6	6
11	(South Africa) E Edwards (South Africa) G Muller	6	6
(United States) M Flur (United States) J Rive	3	2
(Australia) A Emerson (India) R Krishnan	3	1
5	(United States) R Leach (United States) J Pugh	6	6

Third round
3	(Australia) J Fitzgerald (Sweden) A Järryd	6	6
14	(United States) P Chamberlin (United States) S Stewart	0	1
11	(South Africa) E Edwards (South Africa) G Muller	2	2
5	(United States) R Leach (United States) J Pugh	6	6

Quarterfinals
3	(Australia) J Fitzgerald (Sweden) A Järryd	6	3	6	3
5	(United States) R Leach (United States) J Pugh	7	6	3	6

=== Bottom half ===
==== Section 3 ====
First round
6	(United States) S Giammalva (United States) J Grabb	4	4
(Italy) O Camporese (Italy) G Pozzi	6	6
(New Zealand) D Lewis (West Germany) I Werner	6	6
(United Kingdom) S Shaw (West Germany) T Theine	3	4
WC	(Australia) M Edmondson (Australia) B Roe	6	6
(Australia) C Ellis (Australia) C Milne	3	4
(United Kingdom) A Castle (Argentina) R Saad	3	6	8
12	(United States) M Anger (United States) T Pawsat	6	3	6
13	(Australia) B Dyke (Australia) W Masur	1	4
(France) T Benhabiles (France) J Potier	6	6
(United States) R Schmidt (United States) T Siegel	6	7
(United States) B Green (United States) H Pfister	4	6
(United States) J Letts (United States) C Miller	5	6
(Australia) D Macpherson (Australia) S Youl	7	7
(Canada) G Connell (Canada) G Michibata	6	6
4	(Australia) P Doohan (Australia) L Warder	4	4

Second round
(Italy) O Camporese (Italy) G Pozzi	6	5	3
(New Zealand) D Lewis (West Germany) I Werner	4	7	6
WC	(Australia) M Edmondson (Australia) B Roe	2	1
(United Kingdom) A Castle (Argentina) R Saad	6	6
(France) T Benhabiles (France) J Potier	6	3
(United States) R Schmidt (United States) T Siegel	7	6
(Australia) D Macpherson (Australia) S Youl	4	6
(Canada) G Connell (Canada) G Michibata	6	7

Third round
(New Zealand) D Lewis (West Germany) I Werner	6	5	3
(United Kingdom) A Castle (Argentina) R Saad	4	7	6
(United States) R Schmidt (United States) T Siegel	3	3
(Canada) G Connell (Canada) G Michibata	6	6

Quarterfinals
(United Kingdom) A Castle (Argentina) R Saad	6	7	6	6	19
(Canada) G Connell (Canada) G Michibata	7	6	7	3	17

==== Section 4 ====
First round
7	(Australia) D Cahill (Australia) M Kratzmann	7	6
(Italy) P Canè (Italy) D Nargiso	6	4
(Australia) P Carter (Australia) J Frawley	7	7
Alt	(United Kingdom) C Bailey (West Germany) D Keretić	6	6
(West Germany) P Baur (West Germany) A Mronz	2	6
(United Kingdom) J Bates (Sweden) P Lundgren	6	7
WC	(Australia) J Stoltenberg (Australia) T Woodbridge	4	6
9	(Australia) C Limberger (Australia) M Woodforde	6	7
16	(New Zealand) K Evernden (United States) J Kriek	6	6
(United States) B Cox (Australia) M Fancutt	1	3
(United States) C Kennedy (United States) D MacBride	6	6	15
(United States) R Reneberg (United States) J Ross	4	7	17
(Nigeria) T Mmoh (The Bahamas) R Smith	4	6	3
(West Germany) A Maurer (United States) B Scanlon	6	3	6
(United Kingdom) D Felgate (United Kingdom) N Fulwood	1	4
2	(France) G Forget (Socialist Federal Republic of Yugoslavia) S Živojinović	6	6

Second round
7	(Australia) D Cahill (Australia) M Kratzmann	7	6
(Australia) P Carter (Australia) J Frawley	5	4
(United Kingdom) J Bates (Sweden) P Lundgren	6	7
9	(Australia) C Limberger (Australia) M Woodforde	4	5
16	(New Zealand) K Evernden (United States) J Kriek	6	6
(United States) R Reneberg (United States) J Ross	3	4
(West Germany) A Maurer (United States) B Scanlon	3	3
2	(France) G Forget (Socialist Federal Republic of Yugoslavia) S Živojinović	6	6

Third round
7	(Australia) D Cahill (Australia) M Kratzmann	6	4
(United Kingdom) J Bates (Sweden) P Lundgren	7	6
16	(New Zealand) K Evernden (United States) J Kriek	3	7	6
2	(France) G Forget (Socialist Federal Republic of Yugoslavia) S Živojinović	6	5	3

Quarterfinals
(United Kingdom) J Bates (Sweden) P Lundgren	3	7	6	3	7
16	(New Zealand) K Evernden (United States) J Kriek	6	6	2	6	5
