= 1992 Australian Open – Men's doubles =

Tennis tournament

Men's doubles
- 1992 Australian Open

Final
- Champion: (Australia) Todd Woodbridge; (Australia) Mark Woodforde
- Runner-up: (United States) Kelly Jones; (United States) Rick Leach
- Score: 6–4, 6–3, 6–4

Details
- Draw: 64
- Seeds: 16

Events
Singles	men	women		boys	girls
Doubles	men	women	mixed	boys	girls
WC Singles	men	women	quad
WC Doubles	men	women	quad
Legends	men	women	mixed
- Australian Open

Scott Davis and David Pate were the defending champions, but were defeated in the semifinals to fellow Americans Kelly Jones and Rick Leach.

Jones and Leach reached the final, but were defeated by home players The Woodies, in what was their first Grand Slam title as a pair.

== Seeds ==
1. (Australia) John Fitzgerald / (Sweden) Anders Järryd (third round)
2. (United States) Scott Davis / (United States) David Pate (semifinals)
3. (Canada) Grant Connell / (Canada) Glenn Michibata (third round)
4. (Australia) Todd Woodbridge / (Australia) Mark Woodforde (champions)
5. (United States) Patrick Galbraith / (United States) Todd Witsken (first round)
6. (United States) Luke Jensen / (Australia) Laurie Warder (third round)
7. (Spain) Sergio Casal / (Spain) Emilio Sánchez (second round)
8. (Netherlands) Tom Nijssen / (Czechoslovakia) Cyril Suk (quarterfinals)
9. (Argentina) Javier Frana / (Mexico) Leonardo Lavalle (first round)
10. (South Africa) Wayne Ferreira / (South Africa) Pieter Norval (second round)
11. (United States) Kelly Jones / (United States) Rick Leach (final)
12. (Italy) Omar Camporese / (Croatia) Goran Ivanišević (first round)
13. (Netherlands) Paul Haarhuis / (Netherlands) Mark Koevermans (first round)
14. (Germany) Udo Riglewski / (Germany) Michael Stich (first round)
15. (United States) Jim Grabb / (United States) Richey Reneberg (second round)
16. (Switzerland) Jakob Hlasek / (United States) Patrick McEnroe (second round)

== Draw ==
Key

- Q = Qualifier
- WC = Wild card
- LL = Lucky loser
- Alt = Alternate
- ITF = ITF entry
- PR = Protected ranking
- SR = Special ranking
- SE = Special exempt
- JE = Junior exempt
- JR = Junior Accelerator Programme entrant
- CO = College Accelerator Programme entrant
- NG = Next Gen Accelerator Program entrant
- w/o = Walkover
- r = Retired
- d = Defaulted

=== Finals ===
Quarterfinals

Semifinals

Final

- (United States) Jared Palmer
- (United States) Jonathan Stark
7
2
5
6

- (Netherlands) Richard Krajicek
- (Netherlands) Jan Siemerink
6
6
7
7

- (Netherlands) Richard Krajicek
- (Netherlands) Jan Siemerink
6
1^{r}

4
- (Australia) Todd Woodbridge
- (Australia) Mark Woodforde
4
3

4
- (Australia) Todd Woodbridge
- (Australia) Mark Woodforde
6
6
6

- (Australia) Neil Borwick
- (Australia) Simon Youl
1
4
4

4
- (Australia) Todd Woodbridge
- (Australia) Mark Woodforde
6
6
6

11
- (United States) Kelly Jones
- (United States) Rick Leach
4
3
4

8
- (Netherlands) Tom Nijssen
- (Czechoslovakia) Cyril Suk
0
6
6
5

11
- (United States) Kelly Jones
- (United States) Rick Leach
6
2
7
7

11
- (United States) Kelly Jones
- (United States) Rick Leach
4
4
7
6
6

2
- (United States) Scott Davis
- (United States) David Pate
6
6
6
4
3

- (Israel) Gilad Bloom
- (Kenya) Paul Wekesa
3
4
7
3

2
- (United States) Scott Davis
- (United States) David Pate
6
6
6
6

=== Top half ===
==== Section 1 ====
First round

Second round

Third round

Quarterfinals

1
- (Australia) J Fitzgerald
- (Sweden) A Järryd
6
6

- (Australia) B Dyke
- (Sweden) P Lundgren
4
2

1
- (Australia) J Fitzgerald
- (Sweden) A Järryd
6
3
6

- (United States) K Kinnear
- (United States) B Shelton
3
3

- (Netherlands) J Eltingh
- (Netherlands) T Kempers
2
6
3

- (Netherlands) J Eltingh
- (Netherlands) T Kempers
6
6

1
- (Australia) J Fitzgerald
- (Sweden) A Järryd
6
4

- (Spain) F Clavet
- (Spain) MA Górriz
3
1

- (United States) J Palmer
- (United States) J Stark
7
6

- (United States) J Palmer
- (United States) J Stark
6
6

- (United States) J Palmer
- (United States) J Stark
6
5
6

- (Germany) B Becker
- (Czechoslovakia) T Šmíd
4
2

15
- (United States) J Grabb
- (United States) R Reneberg
4
7
4

15
- (United States) J Grabb
- (United States) R Reneberg
6
6

- (United States) J Palmer
- (United States) J Stark
7
2
5
6

12
- (Italy) O Camporese
- (Croatia) G Ivanišević
5
1

- (Netherlands) R Krajicek
- (Netherlands) J Siemerink
6
6
7
7

- (United States) T Nelson
- (Australia) J Stoltenberg
7
6

- (United States) T Nelson
- (Australia) J Stoltenberg
4
2

- (Netherlands) R Krajicek
- (Netherlands) J Siemerink
6
7
6

- (Netherlands) R Krajicek
- (Netherlands) J Siemerink
6
6

- (United Kingdom) N Broad
- (South Africa) G Muller
7
6
3

- (Netherlands) R Krajicek
- (Netherlands) J Siemerink
3
7
6

- (United States) J Brown
- (United States) S Melville
4
3

6
- (United States) L Jensen
- (Australia) L Warder
6
6
3

- (Argentina) P Albano
- (United States) S Cannon
6
6

- (Argentina) P Albano
- (United States) S Cannon
3
5

- (United States) P Annacone
- (United States) J Pugh
6
5

6
- (United States) L Jensen
- (Australia) L Warder
6
7

6
- (United States) L Jensen
- (Australia) L Warder
7
7

==== Section 2 ====
First round

Second round

Third round

Quarterfinals

4
- (Australia) T Woodbridge
- (Australia) M Woodforde
6
6

WC
- (Australia) W Arthurs
- (Australia) R Rasheed
1
1

4
- (Australia) T Woodbridge
- (Australia) M Woodforde
6
6

- (Australia) M Kratzmann
- (South Africa) C van Rensburg
6
6

- (Australia) M Kratzmann
- (South Africa) C van Rensburg
3
4

- (United States) S Patridge
- (Czechoslovakia) T Anzari
2
1

4
- (Australia) T Woodbridge
- (Australia) M Woodforde
6
4
6

- (Brazil) R Acioly
- (Brazil) M Menezes
4
7
3

- (Sweden) R Båthman
- (Sweden) R Bergh
3
6
3

- (Sweden) R Båthman
- (Sweden) R Bergh
6
6
6

- (Sweden) R Båthman
- (Sweden) R Bergh
7
7

- (Argentina) C Miniussi
- (Switzerland) M Rosset
1
6
9

- (Argentina) C Miniussi
- (Switzerland) M Rosset
5
5

13
- (Netherlands) P Haarhuis
- (Netherlands) M Koevermans
6
2
7

4
- (Australia) T Woodbridge
- (Australia) M Woodforde
6
6
6

9
- (Argentina) J Frana
- (Mexico) L Lavalle
1
1^{r}

- (Australia) N Borwick
- (Australia) S Youl
1
4
4

WC
- (Australia) J Morgan
- (Australia) S Stolle
6
1

WC
- (Australia) J Morgan
- (Australia) S Stolle
4
6
3

- (Argentina) H de la Peña
- (Italy) G Pozzi
7
6
4

WC
- (Australia) G Doyle
- (Australia) C Eagle
6
1
6

WC
- (Australia) G Doyle
- (Australia) C Eagle
5
7
6

WC
- (Australia) G Doyle
- (Australia) C Eagle
6
3
6

WC
- (Australia) J Anderson
- (Australia) R Fromberg
4
2

- (Australia) N Borwick
- (Australia) S Youl
3
6
8

- (Australia) N Borwick
- (Australia) S Youl
6
6

- (Australia) N Borwick
- (Australia) S Youl
6
6

- (United Kingdom) J Bates
- (Sweden) S Edberg
2
1

7
- (Spain) S Casal
- (Spain) E Sánchez
2
2

7
- (Spain) S Casal
- (Spain) E Sánchez
6
6

=== Bottom half ===
==== Section 3 ====
First round

Second round

Third round

Quarterfinals

8
- (Netherlands) T Nijssen
- (Czechoslovakia) C Suk
6
6
7

- (United States) TJ Middleton
- (United States) T Scherman
3
7
5

8
- (Netherlands) T Nijssen
- (Czechoslovakia) C Suk
7
3
6

- (United States) G Layendecker
- (South Africa) B Talbot
4
6
3

- (Ecuador) A Gómez
- (Spain) J Sánchez
5
6
2

- (Ecuador) A Gómez
- (Spain) J Sánchez
6
3
6

8
- (Netherlands) T Nijssen
- (Czechoslovakia) C Suk
7
6

- (United States) B Garrow
- (United States) B Pearce
2
1

- (South Africa) P Aldrich
- (South Africa) D Visser
6
3

- (South Africa) P Aldrich
- (South Africa) D Visser
6
6

- (South Africa) P Aldrich
- (South Africa) D Visser
6
7

- (United States) C Beckman
- (United States) S Salumaa
4
2

10
- (South Africa) W Ferreira
- (South Africa) P Norval
3
6

10
- (South Africa) W Ferreira
- (South Africa) P Norval
6
6

8
- (Netherlands) T Nijssen
- (Czechoslovakia) C Suk
0
6
6
5

11
- (United States) K Jones
- (United States) R Leach
6
6

11
- (United States) K Jones
- (United States) R Leach
6
2
7
7

- (South Africa) S Kruger
- (United States) G Van Emburgh
3
2

11
- (United States) K Jones
- (United States) R Leach
6
6

- (Czechoslovakia) V Flégl
- (Belgium) L Pimek
6
3
4

WC
- (Australia) P Rafter
- (Australia) P Tramacchi
4
2

WC
- (Australia) P Rafter
- (Australia) P Tramacchi
3
6
6

11
- (United States) K Jones
- (United States) R Leach
6
4
6

- (South Africa) D Adams
- (Zimbabwe) B Black
6
5
6

3
- (Canada) G Connell
- (Canada) G Michibata
2
6
1

- (United States) S DeVries
- (Australia) D Macpherson
4
7
3

- (South Africa) D Adams
- (Zimbabwe) B Black
2
6
1

- (Italy) D Nargiso
- (Italy) S Pescosolido
3
4

3
- (Canada) G Connell
- (Canada) G Michibata
6
4
6

3
- (Canada) G Connell
- (Canada) G Michibata
6
6

==== Section 4 ====
First round

Second round

Third round

Quarterfinals

5
- (United States) P Galbraith
- (United States) T Witsken
0
5

- (Netherlands) M Schapers
- (Czechoslovakia) D Vacek
6
7

- (Netherlands) M Schapers
- (Czechoslovakia) D Vacek
4
6
1

- (Israel) G Bloom
- (Kenya) P Wekesa
3
6
6

- (Israel) G Bloom
- (Kenya) P Wekesa
6
3
6

- (The Bahamas) R Smith
- (United States) K Thorne
6
1
1

(Israel) G Bloom
(Kenya) P Wekesa
7
6

- (Czechoslovakia) K Nováček
- (Croatia) G Prpić
6
7

- (Czechoslovakia) K Nováček
- (Croatia) G Prpić
6
2

- (United States) J Sobel
- (Socialist Federal Republic of Yugoslavia) S Živojinović
3
6

- (Czechoslovakia) K Nováček
- (Croatia) G Prpić
6
6

- (Germany) P Kühnen
- (Netherlands) M Oosting
7
7

- (Germany) P Kühnen
- (Netherlands) M Oosting
3
3

14
- (Germany) U Riglewski
- (Germany) M Stich
6
6

(Israel) G Bloom
(Kenya) P Wekesa
3
4
7
3

16
- (Switzerland) J Hlasek
- (United States) P McEnroe
6
6

2
- (United States) S Davis
- (United States) D Pate
6
6
6
6

- (United States) B Garnett
- (Sweden) T Svantesson
4
1

16
- (Switzerland) J Hlasek
- (United States) P McEnroe
6
3
1

- (United States) M Keil
- (United States) F Montana
6
6

- (United States) M Keil
- (United States) F Montana
4
6
6

- (Brazil) J Oncins
- (Brazil) F Roese
4
1

- (United States) M Keil
- (United States) F Montana
4
7
3

- (Czechoslovakia) P Korda
- (Australia) W Masur
6
6

2
- (United States) S Davis
- (United States) D Pate
6
6
6

- (Commonwealth of Independent States) A Olhovskiy
- (Commonwealth of Independent States) D Poliakov
1
2

- (Czechoslovakia) P Korda
- (Australia) W Masur
1
3

- (Sweden) D Engel
- (Sweden) J Gunnarsson
6
1
5

2
- (United States) S Davis
- (United States) D Pate
6
6

2
- (United States) S Davis
- (United States) D Pate
3
6
7
