= Dexter MacBride =

American tennis player

- Country (sports): United States
- Born: October 21, 1964 (age 60); Reston, Virginia, U.S.
- Height: 6 ft 4 in (193 cm)
- Plays: Right-handed

Singles
- Career record: 0–1
- Highest ranking: No. 368 (November 30, 1987)

Grand Slam singles results
- Australian Open: Q2 (1988)

Doubles
- Career record: 0–5
- Highest ranking: No. 188 (April 27, 1987)

Grand Slam doubles results
- Australian Open: 1R (1988)

Dexter MacBride (born October 21, 1964) is an American former professional tennis player.

Born in Reston, Virginia, MacBride played college tennis for Trinity University (Texas), before appearing on the professional circuit in the late 1980s.

MacBride qualified for his only Grand Prix singles main draw at 1987 ATP Championships in Mason, Ohio.

At the 1988 Australian Open he competed in singles qualifying and featured in the main draw of the men's doubles, where he and partner Chris Kennedy lost a marathon first round match to Richey Reneberg and John Ross, 15–17 in the final set.
