= Jason Stoltenberg =

Australian tennis player

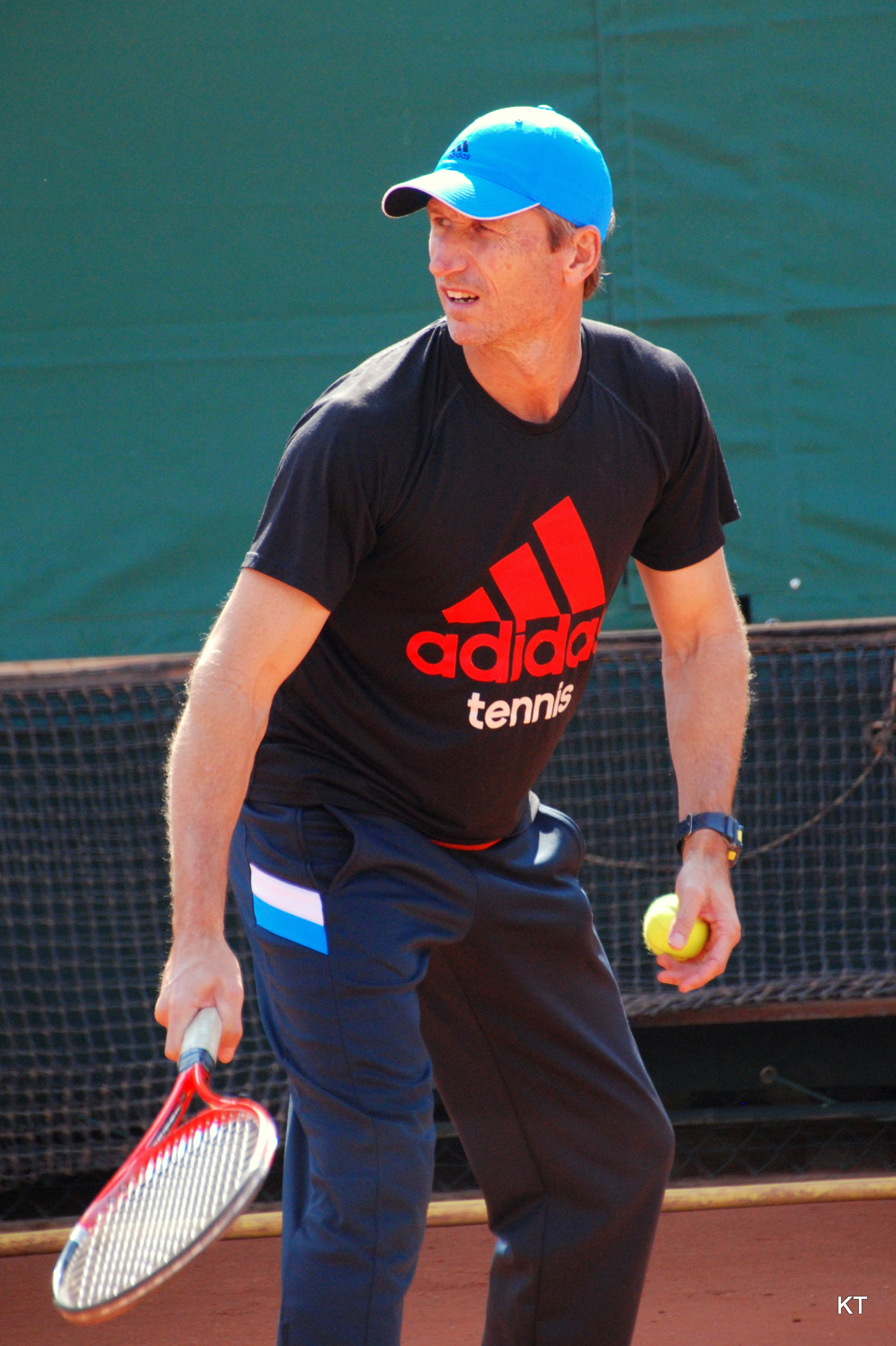
- Country (sports): Australia
- Residence: Orlando, Florida, United States
- Born: 4 April 1970 (age 56) Narrabri, Australia
- Height: 1.85 m (6 ft 1 in)
- Turned pro: 1987
- Retired: 2001
- Plays: Right-handed (one-handed backhand)
- Prize money: $3,259,607

Singles
- Career record: 303–267
- Career titles: 4
- Highest ranking: No. 19 (31 October 1994)

Grand Slam singles results
- Australian Open: 4R (1988)
- French Open: 4R (1998)
- Wimbledon: SF (1996)
- US Open: 3R (1988, 1995, 1996)

Other tournaments
- Grand Slam Cup: 1R (1996)
- Olympic Games: 2R (1996)

Doubles
- Career record: 121–126
- Career titles: 5
- Highest ranking: No. 23 (25 March 1991)

Grand Slam doubles results
- Australian Open: QF (1991, 1996)
- French Open: QF (1990)
- Wimbledon: QF (1990)
- US Open: 2R (1990)

Grand Slam mixed doubles results
- Australian Open: 2R (1988)
- French Open: 3R (1993)
- Wimbledon: QF (1991, 1992)

Jason Stoltenberg (born 4 April 1970) is an Australian former professional tennis player.

== Tennis career ==
Stoltenberg began playing tennis at age ten on an antbed (crushed termite mound) court where his father owned a cotton farm in the Far West (the bush) of New South Wales. He was an Australian Institute of Sport scholarship holder. He is married to Czech former player Andrea Strnadová.

=== Juniors ===
In 1987, he won the Boys' Singles title at the Australian Open and was ranked the No. 1 junior player in the world. He turned professional later that year.

=== Pro tour ===
Stoltenberg reached his first tour singles final in 1989 at Livingston, New Jersey and won his first top-level title in 1993 at Manchester. He was also part of the Australian team which finished runners-up in that year's Davis Cup, losing in the final to Germany.

Stoltenberg's best performance at a Grand Slam event came in 1996, when he reached the semi-finals at Wimbledon, defeating Adrian Voinea, Jiří Novák, Mosé Navarra, Jakob Hlasek and Goran Ivanišević in the quarter-finals, before being knocked-out by eventual champion Richard Krajicek.

During his career, Stoltenberg won four top-level singles titles and five doubles titles. His career-high rankings were World No. 19 in singles and No. 23 in doubles. His career prize money totalled US$3,305,212. His last singles title came in 1997 at Coral Springs, Florida. He retired from the professional tour in 2001.

== Coaching career ==
Stoltenberg was the coach of Lleyton Hewitt from December 2001 until June 2003. He resigned as Hewitt's coach after Hewitt lost to Tommy Robredo at the 2003 French Open.

== ATP career finals ==
=== Singles: 13 (4 titles, 9 runner-ups) ===
Legend Grand Slam tournaments (0–0) ATP World Tour Finals (0–0) ATP World Tour Masters Series (0–1) ATP World Tour Championship Series (0–1) ATP World Tour World Series (4–7)	Titles by surface Hard (0–6) Clay (3–3) Grass (1–0) Carpet (0–0)	Titles by setting Outdoor (4–9) Indoor (0–0)

Result	W–L	Date	Tournament	Tier	Surface	Opponent	Score
Loss	0–1	Aug 1989	Livingston, United States	Grand Prix	Hard	(United States) Brad Gilbert	4–6, 4–6
Win	1–1	Jun 1993	Manchester, United Kingdom	World Series	Grass	(Australia) Wally Masur	6–1, 6–3
Win	2–1	Apr 1994	Birmingham, United States	World Series	Clay	(Argentina) Gabriel Markus	6–3, 6–4
Loss	2–2	Jul 1994	Washington, United States	Championship Series	Hard	(Sweden) Stefan Edberg	4–6, 2–6
Loss	2–3	Jul 1994	Toronto, Canada	Masters Series	Hard	(United States) Andre Agassi	4–6, 4–6
Win	3–3	May 1996	Coral Springs, United States	World Series	Clay	(United States) Chris Woodruff	7–6^{(7–4)}, 2–6, 7–5
Loss	3–4	May 1997	Atlanta, United States	World Series	Clay	(Uruguay) Marcelo Filippini	6–7^{(2–7)}, 4–6
Win	4–4	May 1997	Coral Springs, United States	World Series	Clay	(Sweden) Jonas Björkman	6–0, 2–6, 7–5
Loss	4–5	Jan 1998	Adelaide, Australia	World Series	Hard	(Australia) Lleyton Hewitt	6–3, 3–6, 6–7^{(4–7)}
Loss	4–6	Mar 1998	Scottsdale, United States	World Series	Hard	(United States) Andre Agassi	4–6, 6–7^{(3–7)}
Loss	4–7	May 1998	Atlanta, United States	World Series	Clay	(United States) Pete Sampras	7–6^{(7–2)}, 3–6, 6–7^{(4–7)}
Loss	4–8	Jan 2000	Sydney, Australia	International Series	Hard	(Australia) Lleyton Hewitt	4–6, 0–6
Loss	4–9	Apr 2000	Atlanta, United States	International Series	Clay	(Australia) Andrew Ilie	3–6, 5–7

=== Doubles: 11 (5 titles, 6 runner-ups) ===
Legend Grand Slam tournaments (0–0) ATP World Tour Finals (0–0) ATP World Tour Masters Series(0–0) ATP World Tour Championship Series (0–0) ATP World Tour World Series (5–6)	Titles by surface Hard (3–3) Clay (0–2) Grass (1–1) Carpet (1–0)	Titles by setting Outdoor (4–5) Indoor (1–1)

Result	W–L	Date	Tournament	Tier	Surface	Partner	Opponents	Score
Loss	0–1	Apr 1988	Madrid, Spain	Grand Prix	Clay	(Australia) Todd Woodbridge	(Spain) Sergio Casal (Spain) Emilio Sanchez	7–6, 6–7, 4–6
Loss	0–2	Apr 1990	Seoul, South Korea	World Series	Hard	(Australia) Todd Woodbridge	(Canada) Grant Connell (Canada) Glenn Michibata	6–7, 4–6
Win	1–2	May 1990	Singapore, Singapore	World Series	Hard	(Australia) Mark Kratzmann	(Australia) Brad Drewett (Australia) Todd Woodbridge	6–1, 6–0
Win	2–2	Jun 1990	Manchester, United Kingdom	World Series	Grass	(Australia) Mark Kratzmann	(United Kingdom) Nick Brown (United States) Kelly Jones	6–3, 2–6, 6–4
Win	3–2	Sep 1990	Brisbane, Australia	World Series	Hard	(Australia) Todd Woodbridge	(United States) Brian Garrow (Australia) Mark Woodforde	2–6, 6–4, 6–4
Win	4–2	Feb 1991	San Francisco, United States	World Series	Carpet	(Australia) Wally Masur	(Sweden) Ronnie Båthman (Sweden) Rikard Bergh	4–6, 7–6, 6–4
Loss	4–3	Jan 1992	Adelaide, Australia	World Series	Hard	(Australia) Mark Kratzmann	(Croatia) Goran Ivanisevic (Switzerland) Marc Rosset	6–7, 6–7
Win	5–3	Jan 1993	Sydney, Australia	World Series	Hard	(Australia) Sandon Stolle	(United States) Luke Jensen (United States) Murphy Jensen	6–3, 6–4
Loss	5–4	Apr 1993	Hong Kong, Hong Kong	World Series	Hard	(Australia) Sandon Stolle	(United States) David Wheaton (Australia) Todd Woodbridge	1–6, 3–6
Loss	5–5	Apr 1995	Paget, Bermuda	World Series	Clay	(Australia) Brett Steven	(Canada) Grant Connell (United States) Todd Martin	6–7, 6–2, 5–7
Loss	5–6	Jul 1998	Newport, United States	World Series	Grass	(Australia) Scott Draper	(United States) Doug Flach (Australia) Sandon Stolle	2–6, 6–4, 6–7

== ATP Challenger and ITF Futures finals ==
=== Singles: 3 (3–0) ===
Legend ATP Challenger (3–0) ITF Futures (0–0)	Finals by surface Hard (3–0) Clay (0–0) Grass (0–0) Carpet (0–0)

Result	W–L	Date	Tournament	Tier	Surface	Opponent	Score
Win	1–0	Feb 1993	Indian Wells, United States	Challenger	Hard	(United States) Jared Palmer	6–2, 6–1
Win	2–0	May 1993	Taipei, Taiwan	Challenger	Hard	(United States) Richard Matuszewski	6–0, 6–3
Win	3–0	Mar 1996	Indian Wells, United States	Challenger	Hard	(The Bahamas) Mark Knowles	6–4, 6–2

=== Doubles: 3 (1–2) ===
Legend ATP Challenger (1–2) ITF Futures (0–0)	Finals by surface Hard (1–2) Clay (0–0) Grass (0–0) Carpet (0–0)

Result	W–L	Date	Tournament	Tier	Surface	Partner	Opponents	Score
Loss	0–1	Apr 1991	Taipei, Taiwan	Challenger	Hard	(Australia) Mark Kratzmann	(United States) Kelly Jones (Australia) Todd Woodbridge	6–7, 3–6
Win	1–1	Feb 1993	Indian Wells, United States	Challenger	Hard	(Australia) Patrick Rafter	(Australia) Neil Borwick (Australia) Simon Youl	6–4, 6–3
Loss	1–2	Mar 1996	Indian Wells, United States	Challenger	Hard	(Australia) Peter Tramacchi	(United States) Brett Hansen-Dent (United States) Brian Macphie	3–6, 4–6

== Junior Grand Slam finals ==
=== Singles: 3 (1 title, 2 runner-ups) ===
Result	Year	Tournament	Surface	Opponent	Score
Win	1987	Australian Open	Hard	(Australia) Todd Woodbridge	6–2, 7–6
Loss	1987	French Open	Clay	(Argentina) Guillermo Perez-Roldan	3–6, 6–3, 2–6
Loss	1987	Wimbledon	Grass	(Italy) Diego Nargiso	6–7, 4–6

=== Doubles: 5 (5 titles) ===
Result	Year	Tournament	Surface	Partnet	Opponents	Score
Win	1987	Australian Open	Hard	(Australia) Todd Woodbridge	(Australia) Shane Barr (Australia) Bryan Roe	6–2, 6–4
Win	1987	Wimbledon	Grass	(Australia) Todd Woodbridge	(Italy) Diego Nargiso (Italy) Eugenio Rossi	6–3, 7–6^{(7–2)}
Win	1988	Australian Open	Hard	(Australia) Todd Woodbridge	(Australia) Johan Anderson (Australia) Richard Fromberg	6–3, 6–2
Win	1988	French Open	Clay	(Australia) Todd Woodbridge	(Italy) Cristiano Caratti (Croatia) Goran Ivanisevic	7–6, 7–5
Win	1988	Wimbledon	Grass	(Australia) Todd Woodbridge	(Czech Republic) David Rikl (Czechoslovakia) Tomas Zdrazila	6–4, 1–6, 7–5

== Performance timelines ==
Key
W	F	SF	QF	#R	RR	Q#	DNQ	A	NH

(W) winner; (F) finalist; (SF) semifinalist; (QF) quarterfinalist; (#R) rounds 4, 3, 2, 1; (RR) round-robin stage; (Q#) qualification round; (DNQ) did not qualify; (A) absent; (NH) not held; (SR) strike rate (events won / competed); (W–L) win–loss record.

=== Singles ===
Tournament	1987	1988	1989	1990	1991	1992	1993	1994	1995	1996	1997	1998	1999	2000	2001	SR	W–L	Win %
Grand Slam tournaments
Australian Open	1R	4R	3R	A	2R	1R	3R	2R	1R	1R	A	2R	2R	1R	1R	0 / 13	11–13	46%
French Open	A	A	1R	2R	2R	1R	1R	1R	1R	2R	2R	4R	2R	3R	A	0 / 12	10–12	45%
Wimbledon	Q1	2R	3R	2R	1R	1R	3R	3R	2R	SF	3R	4R	1R	1R	2R	0 / 14	20–14	59%
US Open	A	3R	1R	2R	2R	A	1R	1R	3R	3R	1R	1R	1R	A	1R	0 / 12	9–12	43%
Win–loss	0–1	6–3	4–4	3–3	3–4	0–3	4–4	3–4	3–4	8–4	3–3	7–4	2–4	2–3	1–3	0 / 51	50–51	50%
Olympic Games
Summer Olympics	NH	A	Not Held			A	Not Held			2R	Not Held			A	NH	0 / 1	1–1	50%
ATP Tour Masters 1000
Indian Wells Masters	A	A	A	A	A	A	2R	1R	1R	1R	1R	1R	1R	A	A	0 / 7	1–7	13%
Miami Open	A	A	A	A	1R	2R	3R	3R	2R	2R	2R	1R	3R	A	1R	0 / 10	7–10	41%
Stuttgart	NH	A	A	A	A	A	A	2R	1R	1R	A	2R	A	A	A	0 / 4	2–4	33%
Rome	A	A	1R	A	A	A	A	A	1R	A	A	A	2R	A	A	0 / 3	1–3	25%
Canada Masters	A	A	A	2R	A	2R	2R	F	2R	2R	A	1R	2R	A	A	0 / 8	11–8	58%
Cincinnati Masters	A	A	A	2R	2R	1R	QF	QF	1R	3R	1R	1R	1R	A	A	0 / 10	10–10	50%
Paris Masters	A	A	A	A	2R	A	1R	2R	Q3	1R	A	3R	A	A	A	0 / 5	4–5	44%
Win–loss	0–0	0–0	0–1	2–2	2–3	2–3	7–5	11–6	1–6	4–6	1–3	3–6	3–5	0–0	0–1	0 / 47	36–47	43%

=== Doubles ===
Tournament	1987	1988	1989	1990	1991	1992	1993	1994	1995	1996	1997	1998	1999	2000	2001	SR	W–L	Win %
Grand Slam tournaments
Australian Open	1R	1R	1R	A	QF	2R	1R	1R	A	QF	A	2R	A	A	2R	0 / 10	9–10	47%
French Open	A	3R	A	QF	1R	1R	1R	A	A	2R	A	A	A	A	A	0 / 6	6–6	50%
Wimbledon	A	1R	Q3	QF	1R	1R	1R	A	A	1R	1R	A	A	A	A	0 / 7	3–7	30%
US Open	A	1R	A	2R	1R	A	A	A	A	A	A	A	A	A	A	0 / 3	1–3	25%
Win–loss	0–1	2–4	0–1	7–3	3–4	1–3	0–3	0–1	0–0	4–3	0–1	1–1	0–0	0–0	1–1	0 / 26	19–26	42%
ATP Tour Masters 1000
Indian Wells Masters	A	A	A	A	1R	SF	QF	2R	A	A	A	A	A	A	A	0 / 4	6–4	60%
Miami Open	A	A	2R	A	SF	2R	3R	1R	A	1R	A	A	A	A	A	0 / 6	7–6	54%
Rome	A	2R	A	A	2R	A	A	A	A	A	A	A	A	A	A	0 / 2	2–2	50%
Canada Masters	A	A	A	2R	A	QF	QF	A	A	A	A	A	A	A	A	0 / 3	5–3	63%
Cincinnati Masters	A	A	1R	QF	2R	1R	1R	A	A	A	1R	A	A	A	A	0 / 6	3–6	33%
Paris Masters	A	A	A	A	2R	A	A	A	A	A	A	A	A	A	A	0 / 1	1–1	50%
Win–loss	0–0	1–1	1–2	3–2	6–5	6–4	6–4	1–2	0–0	0–1	0–1	0–0	0–0	0–0	0–0	0 / 22	24–22	52%

=== Mixed doubles ===
Tournament	1988	1989	1990	1991	1992	1993	SR	W–L	Win %
Grand Slam tournaments
Australian Open	2R	1R	A	A	A	A	0 / 2	1–2	33%
French Open	1R	A	2R	1R	1R	3R	0 / 5	3–5	38%
Wimbledon	A	3R	1R	QF	QF	1R	0 / 5	8–5	62%
US Open	A	A	A	A	A	A	0 / 0	0–0	–
Win–loss	1–2	2–2	1–2	3–2	3–2	2–2	0 / 12	12–12	50%
