= Paul Mick =

Australian tennis player

- Country (sports): Australia

Singles
- Highest ranking: No. 437 (13 October 1986)

Grand Slam singles results
- Australian Open: Q2 (1984, 1987)

Doubles
- Career record: 0–1
- Highest ranking: No. 370 (30 November 1987)

Grand Slam doubles results
- Australian Open: 1R (1988)
- Wimbledon: Q3 (1987)

Paul Mick is an Australian former professional tennis player.

Mick, who comes from Melbourne, was a junior quarter-finalist at the 1984 Australian Open.

During the 1980s he featured regularly in the singles qualifying draws for the Australian Open. His only main draw appearance came in the men's doubles, partnering Richard Cahill at the 1988 Australian Open.

He won the Tasmania Challenger doubles title in 1988.

== Challenger titles ==
=== Doubles: (1) ===
Year	Tournament	Surface	Partner	Opponents	Score
1988	Tasmania, Australia	Carpet	(Australia) Charlton Eagle	(Australia) Shane Barr (Australia) Roger Rasheed	7–6, 4–6, 7–6
