= Grant Connell =

Canadian tennis player (born 1965)

- Country (sports): Canada
- Residence: Vancouver, British Columbia
- Born: November 17, 1965 (age 60) Regina, Saskatchewan
- Height: 6 ft 1 in (1.85 m)
- Turned pro: 1986
- Retired: 1997
- Plays: Left-handed (one-handed backhand)
- Prize money: $2,911,097

Singles
- Career record: 75–100
- Career titles: 0
- Highest ranking: No. 67 (17 June 1991)

Grand Slam singles results
- Australian Open: 3R (1991)
- French Open: 1R (1990, 1992)
- Wimbledon: 3R (1994)
- US Open: 2R (1988)

Other tournaments
- Olympic Games: 2R (1988)

Doubles
- Career record: 398–237
- Career titles: 22
- Highest ranking: No. 1 (29 November 1993)

Grand Slam doubles results
- Australian Open: F (1990)
- French Open: SF (1991, 1994)
- Wimbledon: F (1993, 1994, 1996)
- US Open: SF (1995)

Other doubles tournaments
- Olympic Games: 2R (1996)

Grand Slam mixed doubles results
- Australian Open: SF (1995)
- French Open: 2R (1993, 1994)
- Wimbledon: SF (1991, 1994, 1995, 1996, 1997)
- US Open: QF (1993)

Grant Connell (Pronounced: KAHN-nell) (born November 17, 1965) is a former professional tennis player from Canada, who retired in 1997 and in 1999 started working as a real estate agent in Vancouver. He specializes in West Vancouver North Vancouver and Downtown properties real estate transactions. He is considered one of the world's top doubles player from the early to late -1990s, reaching the world No. 1 doubles ranking in November 1993.

Connell won 22 doubles titles during his eleven seasons on the ATP Tour (1986 to 1997). He won his first four with fellow Canadian Glenn Michibata. Upon Michibata's retirement from the tour, Connell joined Patrick Galbraith. The Connell-Galbraith tandem won 12 titles together, including the 1995 season ending Doubles Championships tournament. Connell's next main partner became Byron Black with whom he won four more titles. He also won a title each with Todd Martin and Scott Davis. He was a three-time Wimbledon Championships doubles finalist, twice with Galbraith and once with Black.

A left-hander, Connell best singles ranking was world No. 67, which he reached in June 1991. His best tour singles results were reaching the semifinals of the 1991 Chicago, 1991 Singapore, and 1992 Auckland Grand Prix events.

Connell's best Grand Slam singles results were reaching the third round of the 1991 Australian Open and 1994 Wimbledon.

A solid grass-court player, Connell had Andre Agassi on the ropes in their first round encounter at Wimbledon in 1991. In that match, Connell served a gutsy second serve ace to win the third set tie-breaker and go up two sets to one. Agassi however won the final two sets 7–5, 6–3, to take the match. (The following year at Wimbledon saw Agassi win his first Grand Slam event.) As well, Connell reached five mixed semifinals at Wimbledon. The majority of those with his highly ranked partner Lindsay Davenport. Reporters have noted that neither one of them seemed too concerned about winning any title but had a lot of fun losing.

Connell played Davis Cup for Canada on numerous occasions posting a career 15–6 win–loss record in doubles and an equally impressive 8–3 record in singles. He was a member of Canada's 1991 and 1992 Davis Cup teams winning all three needed matches in each of those wins to put Canada in to the World Group for its first two times in canadian tennis history. Awards: Winner of the “Spirit of Sport” national award for the athlete who gives back the most to charity and their sport; Member of the Canadian Tennis Hall of Fame, Canadian Open Hall of Fame, BC Sports Hall of Fame, Texas A&M University Hall of Fame, and B.C. Summer Swimming Hall of Fame.

== As a college player ==
Growing up in North Vancouver, Connell was an All-American in doubles in 1984 and in singles in 1985 at Texas A&M University. Ranked No. 5 in singles in NCAA‘s and undefeated in the SWC in singles play in ‘85 that same year before turning pro, he lost in the quarterfinals of the NCAA individual tennis championships to fellow future touring pro Mikael Pernfors.

== As a touring pro ==
=== 1984, 1985 ===
While still an amateur, Connell played the Player's International twice as a wild card entry, losing in the first round of the main draw each time. In 1984 he lost to world No. 17, Joakim Nyström, 4–6, 3–6, while the following summer Connell fell to world No. 47, 6–7, 3–6.

On December 30, 1985, Connell was ranked by the ATP No. 570T in singles and No. 724T in doubles.

=== 1986 ===
Connell played the San Luis Potosí Challenger in March, reaching the second round in both singles and doubles. He defeated world No. 327, Evan Ratner, 6–1, 6–4, before losing to world No. 415, Karl Richter, 6–3, 6–7, 3–6, while in doubles, he and partner Mark Greenan, also Canadian, lost their second round match to Mark Wooldridge and Derek Tarr in a third set tie-break.

In July, Connell played two further Challengers. At the Schenectady Challenger, he and Greenan lost in the first round in doubles. At the Berkeley Challenger the following week, Connell and Greenan again lost in the first round, while in singles Connell reached the semifinals, defeating Charles Buzz Strode, Russell Simpson, and Paul Chamberlin all in straight sets before falling to Mike Bauer, 6–7, 2–6.

In August, Connell again played the Player's, but in doubles this time, again partnering Greenan. The pair lost, however, in the first round, to the pair of Ricardo Acuña and Bob Green, 6–1, 3–6, 4–6. Connell next saw action in three European Challengers in November. At the Helsinki Challenger, he lost in both singles and doubles in the first round. The following week at Bergen Challenger, he reached the second round of both, falling to Dan Goldie in three sets in singles and partnering Chamberlin in doubles. Connell finished 1986 on tour with a bang, reaching the semifinals at the Valkenswaard Challenger in both singles and doubles, again partnering Chamberlin.

On December 29, 1986, Connell was ranked world No. 191 in singles and No. 217 in doubles.

=== 1987 ===
Connell began 1987 playing in his first Grand Slam event, the Australian Open. He lost in singles in the first round, in straight sets, to world No. 116 Todd Nelson. In doubles, he and partner American Chris Kennedy reached the second round.

Connell's next main draw action was in March, at the Cherbourg Challenger.

=== 1988 ===
Connell began the year at the AAMI Classic in Sydney, Australia where he lost in the first round to Pete Sampras, 4–6, 7–5, 4–6.

== Career finals ==
=== Doubles: 48 (22 titles / 26 runner-ups) ===
Finals by category Grand Slam (0) Tennis Masters Cup (1) ATP Masters Series (3) ATP Championship Series (8) ATP Tour (10)	Finals by surface Hard (13) Clay (2) Grass (1) Carpet (6)

Result	W-L	Date	Tournament	Surface	Partner	Opponents	Score
Loss	0–1	Mar 1987	Nancy, France	Carpet (i)	(United States) Larry Scott	(India) Ramesh Krishnan (Switzerland) Claudio Mezzadri	4–6, 4–6
Win	1–1	Aug 1988	Livingston, United States	Hard	(Canada) Glenn Michibata	(United States) Marc Flur (United States) Sammy Giammalva Jr.	2–6, 6–4, 7–5
Loss	1–2	Oct 1988	Brisbane, Australia	Hard (i)	(Canada) Glenn Michibata	(Germany) Eric Jelen (Germany) Carl-Uwe Steeb	4–6, 1–6
Loss	1–3	Jan 1990	Australian Open, Melbourne	Hard	(Canada) Glenn Michibata	(South Africa) Pieter Aldrich (South Africa) Danie Visser	4–6, 6–4, 1–6, 4–6
Loss	1–4	Feb 1990	Philadelphia, United States	Carpet (i)	(Canada) Glenn Michibata	(United States) Rick Leach (United States) Jim Pugh	6–3, 4–6, 2–6
Win	2–4	Apr 1990	Seoul, South Korea	Hard	(Canada) Glenn Michibata	(Australia) Jason Stoltenberg (Australia) Todd Woodbridge	7–6, 6–4
Win	3–4	Jul 1990	Washington, D.C., United States	Hard	(Canada) Glenn Michibata	(Mexico) Jorge Lozano (United States) Todd Witsken	6–3, 6–7, 6–2
Loss	3–5	Aug 1990	Indianapolis, United States	Hard	(Canada) Glenn Michibata	(United States) Scott Davis (United States) David Pate	6–7, 6–7
Loss	3–6	Jan 1991	Auckland, New Zealand	Hard	(Canada) Glenn Michibata	(Spain) Sergio Casal (Spain) Emilio Sánchez	6–4, 3–6, 4–6
Loss	3–7	Mar 1991	Chicago, United States	Carpet (i)	(Canada) Glenn Michibata	(United States) Scott Davis (United States) David Pate	4–6, 7–5, 6–7
Win	4–7	Apr 1991	Singapore	Hard	(Canada) Glenn Michibata	(South Africa) Stefan Kruger (South Africa) Christo van Rensburg	6–4, 5–7, 7–6
Loss	4–8	Jun 1991	Queen's Club, England	Grass	(Canada) Glenn Michibata	(Australia) Todd Woodbridge (Australia) Mark Woodforde	4–6, 6–7
Loss	4–9	Jul 1991	Montreal, Canada	Hard	(Canada) Glenn Michibata	(United States) Patrick Galbraith (United States) Todd Witsken	4–6, 6–3, 1–6
Loss	4–10	Aug 1991	Cincinnati, United States	Hard	(Canada) Glenn Michibata	(United States) Ken Flach (United States) Robert Seguso	7–6, 4–6, 5–7
Loss	4–11	Jan 1992	Auckland, New Zealand	Hard	(Canada) Glenn Michibata	(South Africa) Wayne Ferreira (United States) Jim Grabb	4–6, 3–6
Loss	4–12	Apr 1992	Singapore	Hard	(Canada) Glenn Michibata	(Australia) Todd Woodbridge (Australia) Mark Woodforde	7–6, 2–6, 4–6
Loss	4–13	Aug 1992	Indianapolis, United States	Hard	(Canada) Glenn Michibata	(United States) Jim Grabb (United States) Richey Reneberg	6–7, 2–6
Win	5–13	Jan 1993	Auckland, New Zealand	Hard	(United States) Patrick Galbraith	(Austria) Alex Antonitsch (Russia) Alexander Volkov	6–3, 7–6
Loss	5–14	Feb 1993	Dubai, UAE	Hard	(United States) Patrick Galbraith	(Australia) John Fitzgerald (Sweden) Anders Järryd	2–6, 1–6
Loss	5–15	May 1993	Hamburg, Germany	Clay	(United States) Patrick Galbraith	(Netherlands) Paul Haarhuis (Netherlands) Mark Koevermans	4–6, 7–6, 6–7
Loss	5–16	Jul 1993	Wimbledon, London	Grass	(United States) Patrick Galbraith	(Australia) Todd Woodbridge (Australia) Mark Woodforde	6–7, 3–6, 6–7
Loss	5–17	Jul 1993	Washington, D.C., United States	Hard	(United States) Patrick Galbraith	(Zimbabwe) Byron Black (United States) Rick Leach	4–6, 5–7
Loss	5–18	Aug 1993	Los Angeles, United States	Hard	(United States) Scott Davis	(South Africa) Wayne Ferreira (Germany) Michael Stich	6–7, 6–7
Win	6–18	Oct 1993	Tokyo Indoor, Japan	Carpet (i)	(United States) Patrick Galbraith	(United States) Luke Jensen (United States) Murphy Jensen	6–3, 6–4
Win	7–18	Nov 1993	Antwerp, Belgium	Carpet (i)	(United States) Patrick Galbraith	(South Africa) Wayne Ferreira (Spain) Javier Sánchez	6–3, 7–6
Loss	7–19	Jan 1994	Auckland, New Zealand	Hard	(United States) Patrick Galbraith	(United States) Patrick McEnroe (United States) Jared Palmer	2–6, 6–4, 4–6
Loss	7–20	Feb 1994	Stuttgart Indoor, Germany	Carpet (i)	(United States) Patrick Galbraith	(South Africa) David Adams (Russia) Andrei Olhovskiy	7–6, 4–6, 6–7
Win	8–20	Mar 1994	Indian Wells, United States	Hard	(United States) Patrick Galbraith	(Zimbabwe) Byron Black (United States) Jonathan Stark	7–5, 6–3
Loss	8–21	Jul 1994	Wimbledon, London	Grass	(United States) Patrick Galbraith	(Australia) Todd Woodbridge (Australia) Mark Woodforde	6–7, 3–6, 1–6
Win	9–21	Jul 1994	Washington D.C., U.S.	Hard	(United States) Patrick Galbraith	(Sweden) Jonas Björkman (Switzerland) Jakob Hlasek	6–4, 4–6, 6–3
Win	10–21	Aug 1994	New Haven, United States	Hard	(United States) Patrick Galbraith	(Netherlands) Jacco Eltingh (Netherlands) Paul Haarhuis	6–4, 7–6
Win	11–21	Oct 1994	Tokyo Indoor, Japan	Carpet (i)	(United States) Patrick Galbraith	(Zimbabwe) Byron Black (United States) Jonathan Stark	6–3, 3–6, 6–4
Loss	11–22	Jan 1995	Adelaide, Australia	Hard	(Zimbabwe) Byron Black	(United States) Jim Courier (Australia) Patrick Rafter	6–7, 4–6
Win	12–22	Jan 1995	Auckland, New Zealand	Hard	(United States) Patrick Galbraith	(Argentina) Luis Lobo (Spain) Javier Sánchez	6–4, 6–3
Win	13–22	Feb 1995	Dubai, UAE	Hard	(United States) Patrick Galbraith	(Spain) Tomás Carbonell (Spain) Francisco Roig	6–2, 4–6, 6–3
Win	14–22	Feb 1995	Stuttgart Indoor, Germany	Carpet (i)	(United States) Patrick Galbraith	(Czech Republic) Cyril Suk (Czech Republic) Daniel Vacek	6–2, 6–2
Win	15–22	Apr 1995	Bermuda	Clay	(United States) Todd Martin	(New Zealand) Brett Steven (Australia) Jason Stoltenberg	7–6, 2–6, 7–5
Loss	15–23	Oct 1995	Kuala Lumpur, Malaysia	Carpet	(United States) Patrick Galbraith	(United States) Patrick McEnroe (Australia) Mark Philippoussis	5–7, 4–6
Win	16–23	Nov 1995	Paris Indoor, France	Carpet (i)	(United States) Patrick Galbraith	(United States) Jim Grabb (United States) Todd Martin	6–2, 6–2
Loss	16–24	Nov 1995	Stockholm, Sweden	Hard (i)	(United States) Patrick Galbraith	(Netherlands) Jacco Eltingh (Netherlands) Paul Haarhuis	6–3, 2–6, 6–7
Win	17–24	Nov 1995	Doubles Championships, Eindhoven	Carpet (i)	(United States) Patrick Galbraith	(Netherlands) Jacco Eltingh (Netherlands) Paul Haarhuis	7–6, 7–6, 3–6, 7–6
Win	18–24	Feb 1996	Dubai, UAE	Hard	(Zimbabwe) Byron Black	(Czech Republic) Karel Nováček (Czech Republic) Jiří Novák	6–0, 6–1
Loss	18–25	Mar 1996	Philadelphia, United States	Carpet (i)	(Zimbabwe) Byron Black	(Australia) Todd Woodbridge (Australia) Mark Woodforde	6–7, 2–6
Win	19–25	May 1996	Rome, Italy	Clay	(Zimbabwe) Byron Black	(Belgium) Libor Pimek (South Africa) Byron Talbot	6–2, 6–3
Win	20–25	Jun 1996	Halle, Germany	Grass	(Zimbabwe) Byron Black	(Russia) Yevgeny Kafelnikov (Czech Republic) Daniel Vacek	6–1, 7–5
Loss	20–26	Jul 1996	Wimbledon, London	Grass	(Zimbabwe) Byron Black	(Australia) Todd Woodbridge (Australia) Mark Woodforde	6–4, 1–6, 3–6, 2–6
Win	21–26	Jul 1996	Washington, D.C., United States	Hard	(United States) Scott Davis	(United States) Doug Flach (United States) Chris Woodruff	7–6, 3–6, 6–3
Win	22–26	Aug 1996	New Haven, United States	Hard	(Zimbabwe) Byron Black	(Sweden) Jonas Björkman (Sweden) Nicklas Kulti	6–4, 6–4

== Doubles performance timeline ==
Key
W	F	SF	QF	#R	RR	Q#	DNQ	A	NH

(W) winner; (F) finalist; (SF) semifinalist; (QF) quarterfinalist; (#R) rounds 4, 3, 2, 1; (RR) round-robin stage; (Q#) qualification round; (DNQ) did not qualify; (A) absent; (NH) not held; (SR) strike rate (events won / competed); (W–L) win–loss record.

Tournament	1984	1985	1986	1987	1988	1989	1990	1991	1992	1993	1994	1995	1996	1997	Career SR	Career W-L
Grand Slam tournaments
Australian Open	A	A	NH	2R	QF	QF	F	3R	3R	2R	1R	2R	2R	3R	0 / 11	21–11
French Open	A	A	A	A	1R	1R	3R	SF	2R	1R	SF	2R	2R	A	0 / 9	13–9
Wimbledon	A	A	A	1R	3R	1R	QF	SF	2R	F	F	1R	F	2R	0 / 11	26–11
US Open	A	A	A	1R	1R	1R	3R	2R	3R	2R	1R	SF	1R	3R	0 / 11	11–11
Grand Slam SR	0 / 0	0 / 0	0 / 0	0 / 3	0 / 4	0 / 4	0 / 4	0 / 4	0 / 4	0 / 4	0 / 4	0 / 4	0 / 4	0 / 3	0 / 42	N/A
Annual win–loss	0–0	0–0	0–0	1–3	5–4	3–4	12–4	11–4	6–4	7–4	9–4	6–4	7–4	4–3	N/A	71–42
ATP Masters Series
Indian Wells	These Tournaments Were Not Masters Series Events Before 1990						2R	2R	QF	2R	W	QF	SF	2R	1 / 8	11–7
Miami	These Tournaments Were Not Masters Series Events Before 1990						3R	2R	3R	2R	2R	SF	SF	QF	0 / 8	7–8
Monte Carlo	These Tournaments Were Not Masters Series Events Before 1990						A	A	A	2R	QF	2R	SF	A	0 / 4	4–4
Rome	These Tournaments Were Not Masters Series Events Before 1990						A	A	A	1R	1R	2R	W	2R	1 / 5	7–4
Hamburg	These Tournaments Were Not Masters Series Events Before 1990						A	A	A	F	2R	QF	QF	1R	0 / 5	7–5
Canada	These Tournaments Were Not Masters Series Events Before 1990						SF	F	1R	SF	2R	SF	QF	A	0 / 7	10–7
Cincinnati	These Tournaments Were Not Masters Series Events Before 1990						2R	F	2R	SF	QF	QF	QF	A	0 / 7	9–7
Stuttgart (Stockholm)	These Tournaments Were Not Masters Series Events Before 1990						SF	2R	SF	SF	2R	SF	2R	A	0 / 7	9–7
Paris	These Tournaments Were Not Masters Series Events Before 1990						2R	2R	2R	QF	SF	W	SF	A	1 / 7	9–6
Masters Series SR	N/A						0 / 6	0 / 6	0 / 6	0 / 9	1 / 9	1 / 9	1 / 9	0 / 4	3 / 58	N/A
Annual win–loss	N/A						6–6	7–6	7–6	12–9	9–8	13–8	16–8	3–4	N/A	73–55
Year-end ranking	758	724	217	96	32	48	10	10	27	1	7	5	3	100	N/A	

== Honours ==
Connell was inducted into the Canadian Tennis Hall of Fame in 1998.

== After retiring as a tennis pro ==
Upon retiring from the tour in 1997, Connell became High Performance Director at Tennis BC as well as Davis Cup Captain. As captain he led the team to the World Group for only the third time. He was also the Tournament Director for Rogers Cup in Toronto in 2006 As of the last 14 years Grant has been selling real estate in Vancouver, BC.
