= Carl Turich =

Australian tennis player

- Country (sports): Australia
- Born: 1 January 1969 (age 56)
- Prize money: $12,645

Singles
- Career record: 0–3
- Highest ranking: No. 358 (26 Sep 1988)

Grand Slam singles results
- Australian Open: 1R (1988, 1989)

Doubles
- Career record: 1–3
- Highest ranking: No. 311 (6 Jun 1988)

Grand Slam doubles results
- Australian Open: 1R (1988, 1989)

Carl Turich (born 1 January 1969) is an Australian former professional tennis player.

Turich, a Western Australian of Croatian descent, trained at the AIS in Canberra. He competed on the professional tour in the late 1980s and had a best world ranking of 358, with two main draw appearances at the Australian Open.

== ATP Challenger finals ==
=== Doubles: 1 (0–1) ===
| Result | Date | Tournament | Surface | Partner | Opponents | Score |
|---|---|---|---|---|---|---|
| Loss | Nov 1989 | Tasmania, Australia | Carpet | (Australia) Roger Rasheed | (Australia) Jamie Morgan (Australia) Todd Woodbridge | 6–7, 6–7 |
