= 1988 Australian Open – Men's singles =

Men's singles
- 1988 Australian Open

Final
- Champion: (Sweden) Mats Wilander
- Runner-up: (Australia) Pat Cash
- Score: 6–3, 6–7^{(3–7)}, 3–6, 6–1, 8–6

Details
- Draw: 128
- Seeds: 16

Events
Singles	men	women		boys	girls
Doubles	men	women	mixed	boys	girls
WC Singles	men	women	quad
WC Doubles	men	women	quad
Legends	men	women	mixed
- Australian Open

Mats Wilander defeated Pat Cash in the final, 6–3, 6–7^{(3–7)}, 3–6, 6–1, 8–6 to win the men's singles tennis title at the 1988 Australian Open. It was his third Australian Open title and fifth major singles title overall.

Stefan Edberg was the two-time defending champion, but lost in the semifinals to Wilander.

This marked the first edition of the tournament to be held on hardcourts, having previously been held on grass courts.

== Seeds ==
The seeded players are listed below. Mats Wilander is the champion; others show the round in which they were eliminated.

1. (Czechoslovakia) Ivan Lendl (semifinals)
2. (Sweden) Stefan Edberg (semifinals)
3. (Sweden) Mats Wilander (champion)
4. (Australia) Pat Cash (finals)
5. (France) Yannick Noah (fourth round)
6. (Sweden) Anders Järryd (quarterfinals)
7. (France) Henri Leconte (third round)
8. (Socialist Federal Republic of Yugoslavia) Slobodan Živojinović (third round)

9. (Switzerland) Jakob Hlasek (first round)
10. (Israel) Amos Mansdorf (first round)
11. (Sweden) Peter Lundgren (second round)
12. (South Africa) Christo van Rensburg (third round)
13. (United States) Paul Annacone (first round)
14. (Sweden) Jonas Svensson (fourth round)
15. (New Zealand) Kelly Evernden (first round)
16. (Australia) Wally Masur (fourth round)

Click on the seed number of a player to go to their draw section.

== Draw ==
Key

- Q = Qualifier
- WC = Wild card
- LL = Lucky loser
- Alt = Alternate
- ITF = ITF entry
- PR = Protected ranking
- SR = Special ranking
- SE = Special exempt
- JE = Junior exempt
- JR = Junior Accelerator Programme entrant
- CO = College Accelerator Programme entrant
- NG = Next Gen Accelerator Program entrant
- w/o = Walkover
- r = Retired
- d = Defaulted

=== Finals ===
Quarterfinals
1	(Czechoslovakia) Ivan Lendl	6	6	7
(United States) Todd Witsken	2	1	6
4	(Australia) Pat Cash	6	6	6
(Netherlands) Michiel Schapers	1	4	2
6	(Sweden) Anders Järryd	6^{2}	2	3
3	(Sweden) Mats Wilander	7^{7}	6	6
(Soviet Union) Andrei Chesnokov	6	6	4	4
2	(Sweden) Stefan Edberg	4	7	6	6

Semifinals
1	(Czechoslovakia) Ivan Lendl	4	6	2	6	2
4	(Australia) Pat Cash	6	2	6	4	6
3	(Sweden) Mats Wilander	6	6^{5}	6	3	6
2	(Sweden) Stefan Edberg	0	7^{7}	3	6	1

Final
4	(Australia) Pat Cash	3	7^{7}	6	1	6
3	(Sweden) Mats Wilander	6	6^{3}	3	6	8

=== Top half ===
==== Section 1 ====
First round
1	(Czechoslovakia) I Lendl	6	7	6
Q	(Australia) B Roe	3	6	2
(United Kingdom) A Castle	3	1	4
(United States) M Anger	6	6	6
(Australia) M Woodforde	6	6	6
(Australia) J Fitzgerald	4	3	3
(United States) M Flur	2	7	0	6	4
WC	(Australia) R Fromberg	6	6	6	4	6
(Australia) B Drewett	4	2	5
(United States) J Pugh	6	6	7
(India) R Krishnan	6	3	6	4	6
Q	(South Korea) B-s Kim	3	6	4	6	4
(Sweden) H Sundström	6	3	4	0
(West Germany) P Baur	3	6	6	6
(Sweden) T Högstedt	3	4	6	1
16	(Australia) W Masur	6	6	3	6

Second round
1	(Czechoslovakia) I Lendl	6	6	6
(United States) M Anger	0	1	1
(Australia) M Woodforde	7	6	6
WC	(Australia) R Fromberg	5	0	2
(United States) J Pugh	6	4	2	4
(India) R Krishnan	4	6	6	6
(West Germany) P Baur	5	6	4
16	(Australia) W Masur	7	7	6

Third round
1	(Czechoslovakia) I Lendl	6	6	6
(Australia) M Woodforde	4	3	1
(India) R Krishnan	3	2	6	1
16	(Australia) W Masur	6	6	3	6

Fourth round
1	(Czechoslovakia) I Lendl	7	6	6
16	(Australia) W Masur	5	4	4

==== Section 2 ====
First round
9	(Switzerland) J Hlasek	3	3	4
(Australia) B Dyke	6	6	6
(Netherlands) M Oosting	6	7	6
(France) T Tulasne	2	6	3
Q	(Italy) O Camporese	2	1	7	2
(South Africa) D Visser	6	6	6	6
(Argentina) R Saad	5	7	6	6
(United States) L Scott	7	6	4	3
WC	(Australia) S Barr	1	3	6	1
(Australia) D Cahill	6	6	4	6
Q	(Japan) S Matsuoka	7	5	3	2
(United States) T Witsken	5	7	6	6
(Australia) P Doohan	6	7	6
Q	(New Zealand) S Guy	3	6	3
LL	(Australia) P Carter	1	6	1	4
7	(France) H Leconte	6	3	6	6

Second round
(Australia) B Dyke	6	6	3	1
(Netherlands) M Oosting	7	0	6	6
(South Africa) D Visser	3	6	3	7	8
(Argentina) R Saad	6	3	6	5	6
(Australia) D Cahill	4	5	2
(United States) T Witsken	6	7	6
(Australia) P Doohan	5	2	2
7	(France) H Leconte	7	6	6

Third round
(Netherlands) M Oosting	7	4	6	6
(South Africa) D Visser	5	6	1	4
(United States) T Witsken	6	6	6
7	(France) H Leconte	4	3	4

Fourth round
(Netherlands) M Oosting	1	2	2
(United States) T Witsken	6	6	6

==== Section 3 ====
First round
4	(Australia) P Cash	7	6	6
(Austria) T Muster	5	1	4
Q	(Australia) A Lane	5	0	1
(Australia) C Limberger	7	6	6
(United States) T Wilkison	2	4	4
(United States) S Giammalva Jr.	6	6	6
(Australia) P McNamee	6	6	6
(United States) B Scanlon	3	3	3
(Canada) G Michibata	3	6	7	6
(Netherlands) T Nijssen	6	4	5	2
(Italy) C Pistolesi	4	6	1
(Sweden) N Kroon	6	7	6
(United States) J Ross	4	7	6	2	3
(Sweden) M Tideman	6	6	4	6	6
(New Zealand) B Derlin	0	1	0
14	(Sweden) J Svensson	6	6	6

Second round
4	(Australia) P Cash	6	7	6
(Australia) C Limberger	1	6	3
(United States) S Giammalva Jr.	7	6	2	1	r
(Australia) P McNamee	6	7	6	4
(Canada) G Michibata	6	2	3
(Sweden) N Kroon	7	6	6
(Sweden) M Tideman	2	3	3
14	(Sweden) J Svensson	6	6	6

Third round
4	(Australia) P Cash	6	6	6
(Australia) P McNamee	1	2	1
(Sweden) N Kroon	2	7	4	3
14	(Sweden) J Svensson	6	6	6	6

Fourth round
4	(Australia) P Cash	6	6	6
14	(Sweden) J Svensson	1	4	1

==== Section 4 ====
First round
12	(South Africa) C van Rensburg	6	7	6	6
(United States) K Jones	2	6	7	3
(United States) CB Cox	3	3	3
(Nigeria) T Mmoh	6	6	6
(United States) D Rostagno	6	7	7
(South Africa) G Muller	4	6	5
Q	(West Germany) I Werner	6	6	5	3	10
(Netherlands) M Schapers	3	4	7	6	12
WC	(Australia) R Rasheed	6	5	6	5	6
(Soviet Union) A Võsand	4	7	4	7	1
(South Africa) E Edwards	6	6	6
Q	(United Kingdom) D Felgate	1	1	1
(Italy) M Narducci	7	6	3	4	7
(United States) M Bauer	5	4	6	6	5
(The Bahamas) R Smith	7	7	4	2	14
5	(France) Y Noah	6	5	6	6	16

Second round
12	(South Africa) C van Rensburg	6	6	6
(Nigeria) T Mmoh	4	3	2
(United States) D Rostagno	4	6	5	6	3
(Netherlands) M Schapers	6	4	7	4	6
WC	(Australia) R Rasheed	4	7	4	4
(South Africa) E Edwards	6	6	6	6
(Italy) M Narducci	7	2	2	1
5	(France) Y Noah	6	6	6	6

Third round
12	(South Africa) C van Rensburg	6	3	3	4
(Netherlands) M Schapers	2	6	6	6
(South Africa) E Edwards	3	7	6	4
5	(France) Y Noah	6	6	7	6

Fourth round
(Netherlands) M Schapers	2	7	6	7
5	(France) Y Noah	6	6	3	6

=== Bottom half ===
==== Section 5 ====
First round
6	(Sweden) A Järryd	6	6	6
Q	(Australia) C Eagle	0	2	2
(Italy) G Pozzi	2	6	6	4
(Australia) CA Miller	6	4	3	2^{r}
(West Germany) P Kühnen	6	7	4	6	6
LL	(South Africa) C Steyn	2	5	6	7	2
Q	(West Germany) T Theine	4	3	2
(United States) P Chamberlin	6	6	6
(France) G Forget	6	6	6
(Canada) G Connell	2	3	4
(United States) J Grabb	3	6	6	6
Q	(United States) H Pfister	6	3	4	0
(Australia) J Frawley	6	6	3
(United States) B Schultz	3	0	1^{r}
Q	(United States) C Kennedy	5	1	2
11	(Sweden) P Lundgren	7	6	6

Second round
6	(Sweden) A Järryd	6	7	6
(Italy) G Pozzi	4	6	3
(Germany) P Kühnen	4	6	4	6
(United States) P Chamberlin	6	3	6	7
(France) G Forget	4	5	7	7	5
(United States) J Grabb	6	7	5	6	7
(Australia) J Frawley	6	6	6
11	(Sweden) P Lundgren	1	3	3

Third round
6	(Sweden) A Järryd	7	6	6
(United States) P Chamberlin	5	1	2
(United States) J Grabb	3	2	7	4
(Australia) J Frawley	6	6	6	6

Fourth round
6	(Sweden) A Järryd	3	6	6	7	6
(Australia) J Frawley	6	1	7	6	2

==== Section 6 ====
First round
13	(United States) P Annacone	6	6	3	5	4
(France) J Potier	3	4	6	7	6
(Canada) C Pridham	7	6	6
(United States) C Hooper	5	3	2
(United States) T Nelson	6	2	6	3
(West Germany) C Saceanu	2	6	7	6
WC	(Australia) A Anderson	3	3	3
(South Africa) B Moir	6	6	6
(Sweden) M Gustafsson	3	6	6	6
WC	(Australia) J Anderson	6	4	1	2
Q	(United Kingdom) C Bailey	3	3	7	2
(United States) J Kriek	6	6	5	6
(Australia) S Youl	3	6	6	1	6
(Sweden) C Bergström	6	3	4	6	1
(United States) R Reneberg	6^{5}	1	3
3	(Sweden) M Wilander	7^{7}	6	6

Second round
(France) J Potier	7	6	6
(Canada) C Pridham	6	3	2
(West Germany) C Saceanu	6	6	6
(South Africa) B Moir	4	4	4
(Sweden) M Gustafsson	6	6	6
(United States) J Kriek	3	1	4
(Australia) S Youl	4	2	4
3	(Sweden) M Wilander	6	6	6

Third round
(France) J Potier	2	1	5
(West Germany) C Saceanu	6	6	7
(Sweden) M Gustafsson	1	4	1
3	(Sweden) M Wilander	6	6	6

Fourth round
(Germany) C Saceanu	2	4	3
3	(Sweden) M Wilander	6	6	6

==== Section 7 ====
First round
8	(Socialist Federal Republic of Yugoslavia) S Živojinović	4	7	7	6
Q	(United States) R Schmidt	6	6	6	1
(United Kingdom) S Shaw	7	7	6
WC	(Australia) C Turich	5	6	3
(West Germany) C-U Steeb	6	6	6
Q	(Australia) R Barlow	0	1	1
(United States) R Leach	6	6	6
(Soviet Union) A Olhovskiy	3	2	4
(Italy) P Canè	6	7	6
(West Germany) A Maurer	3	6	1
(Australia) M Kratzmann	6	6	7
(Netherlands) H van Boeckel	3	3	6
(Austria) H Skoff	3	6	6	5
(France) T Benhabiles	6	3	7	7
(Soviet Union) A Chesnokov	6	4	7	6
10	(Israel) A Mansdorf	3	6	5	2

Second round
8	(Socialist Federal Republic of Yugoslavia) S Živojinović	6	6	6	6
(United Kingdom) S Shaw	4	4	7	3
(West Germany) C-U Steeb	6	6	3	5	6
(United States) R Leach	4	2	6	7	2
(Italy) P Canè	6	3	1	2
(Australia) M Kratzmann	4	6	6	6
(France) T Benhabiles	1	5	6
(Soviet Union) A Chesnokov	6	7	7

Third round
8	(Socialist Federal Republic of Yugoslavia) S Živojinović	4	5	6	6	3
(West Germany) C-U Steeb	6	7	2	1	6
(Australia) M Kratzmann	5	6	2
(Soviet Union) A Chesnokov	7	7	6

Fourth round
(West Germany) C-U Steeb	1	4	2
(Soviet Union) A Chesnokov	6	6	6

==== Section 8 ====
First round
15	(New Zealand) K Evernden	5	7	1	7	3
(United Kingdom) J Bates	7	5	6	6	6
(United States) J Rive	2	6	6	6
(Italy) D Nargiso	6	1	1	2
(United States) J Levine	1	3	1
WC	(Australia) J Stoltenberg	6	6	6
Q	(United States) J Letts	2	0	1
WC	(Australia) T Woodbridge	6	6	6
(Canada) M Laurendeau	6	6	4	4	9
(United States) D Cassidy	4	3	6	6	7
(United States) D Goldie	6	6	4	6
(West Germany) D Keretić	3	4	6	3
(West Germany) A Mronz	6	6	3	6	6
(Soviet Union) A Volkov	3	2	6	7	4
(United States) M Davis	6	2	2	5
2	(Sweden) S Edberg	4	6	6	7

Second round
(United Kingdom) J Bates	7	1	2	4
(United States) J Rive	5	6	6	6
WC	(Australia) J Stoltenberg	6	6	6
WC	(Australia) T Woodbridge	3	2	4
(Canada) M Laurendeau	4	3	1
(United States) D Goldie	6	6	6
(Germany) A Mronz	4	3	1
2	(Sweden) S Edberg	6	6	6

Third round
(United States) J Rive	2	2	2
WC	(Australia) J Stoltenberg	6	6	6
(United States) D Goldie	4	5	6	3
2	(Sweden) S Edberg	6	7	2	6

Fourth round
WC	(Australia) J Stoltenberg	3	3	4
2	(Sweden) S Edberg	6	6	6

Preceded by 1987 US Open	Grand Slam men's singles	Succeeded by 1988 French Open
