= Adam Anderson (tennis) =

Australian tennis player

- Country (sports): Australia
- Born: 21 December 1969 (age 56) Sydney, Australia
- Height: 5 ft 11 in (180 cm)

Singles
- Career record: 0–2
- Highest ranking: No. 280 (26 September 1988)

Grand Slam singles results
- Australian Open: 1R (1988, 1989)

Doubles
- Career record: 1–3
- Highest ranking: No. 311 (6 June 1988)

Grand Slam doubles results
- Australian Open: 1R (1988, 1989)

Adam Anderson (born 21 December 1969) is an Australian former professional tennis player.

A left-handed player from Sydney, Anderson was an Australian Institute of Sport scholarship holder and competed on the professional tour in the late 1980s. He featured in the main draw of the 1988 and 1989 editions of the Australian Open.

Anderson, along with wife Carol, appeared in series six of the reality cooking show My Kitchen Rules in 2015.
