= Craig D. Miller =

American tennis player

Craig Miller
- Country (sports): United States
- Residence: Santa Ana, California
- Born: March 10, 1963 (age 62); Pasadena, California
- Height: 6 ft 0 in (1.83 m)
- Plays: Right-handed

Singles
- Highest ranking: No. 632 (September 28, 1987)

Doubles
- Career record: 6-10
- Career titles: 0
- Highest ranking: No. 220 (July 27, 1987)

Grand Slam doubles results
- Australian Open: 1R (1988)

Mixed doubles

Grand Slam mixed doubles results
- Wimbledon: 1R (1988)

Craig D. Miller (born March 10, 1963) is a former professional tennis player from the United States.

== Career ==
Miller, who grew up playing football, competed in the Big West Conference for the Cal State Long Beach tennis team in the mid-1980s. He was the No. 5 singles champion in 1985 and both No. 3 singles champion and No. 1 doubles champion (with Kevin Gillette) the following year.

On the Grand Prix tennis circuit, he was best as a doubles player and while partnering Patrick McEnroe made the quarter-finals at the Pro Tennis Championships in 1987. He took part in the 1988 Australian Open men's doubles, with John Letts, but the pair were eliminated in the first round, to David Macpherson and Simon Youl. The American also played in the mixed doubles event at the 1988 Wimbledon Championships. He and his partner Jill Smoller were defeated in the opening round.
