= Brett Buffington =

American tennis player

- Full name: Brett Culver Buffington
- Country (sports): United States
- Born: May 5, 1961 (age 64); Medford, Oregon, U.S.
- Height: 6 ft 0 in (183 cm)
- Plays: Right-handed
- Prize money: $17,342

Singles
- Highest ranking: No. 731 (December 19, 1988)

Grand Slam singles results
- Australian Open: Q1 (1988)

Doubles
- Career record: 2–12
- Highest ranking: No. 173 (May 26, 1986)

Grand Slam doubles results
- Australian Open: 1R (1988)
- French Open: 1R (1986, 1987)

Grand Slam mixed doubles results
- Australian Open: 1R (1988)
- French Open: 1R (1987)
- Wimbledon: 3R (1987)

Brett Culver Buffington (born May 5, 1961) is a former professional tennis player from the United States.

== Biography ==
Buffington, who was raised in La Jolla, played college tennis for UCLA and was a member of the 1984 NCAA Championship winning team.

For the remainder of the 1980s, Buffington competed on the professional tour, primarily as a doubles player. He made the round of 16 in the mixed doubles at the 1987 Wimbledon Championships, partnering Nicole Jagerman of the Netherlands.

Based in La Jolla, California Brett has partnered with Phillip Agassi in luxury real estate in San Diego and Las Vegas. BuffingtonAgassi.com

== Challenger titles ==
=== Doubles: (1) ===
Year	Tournament	Surface	Partner	Opponents	Score
1987	Parioli, Italy	Clay	(United States) Mark Basham	(Italy) Massimo Cierro (Italy) Alessandro de Minicis	4–6, 6–2, 6–1
