= Stefan Heckmanns =

German tennis player

- Country (sports): West Germany; Germany
- Born: 6 April 1963 (age 61); Cologne, West Germany
- Height: 6 ft 4 in (193 cm)
- Plays: Right-handed

Singles
- Career record: 0–1
- Highest ranking: No. 762 (12 June 1989)

Doubles
- Career record: 0–2
- Highest ranking: No. 311 (28 December 1987)

Grand Slam doubles results
- Australian Open: 1R (1988)

Stefan Heckmanns (born 6 April 1963) is a German former professional tennis player.

A right-handed player from Cologne, Heckmanns began competing professionally in 1987.

Heckmanns featured in the doubles main draw of the 1988 Australian Open, with local player Anthony Spartalis as his partner. His only Grand Prix/ATP Tour main draw appearance in singles came at the 1988 Bristol Open, as a lucky loser from qualifying.
