= Barry Moir =

South African tennis player

- Country (sports): South Africa
- Born: 1 June 1963 (age 62) Johannesburg, South Africa
- Height: 1.80 m (5 ft 11 in)
- Plays: Right-handed
- Prize money: $193,347

Singles
- Career record: 36–59
- Career titles: 0
- Highest ranking: No. 92 (28 July 1986)

Grand Slam singles results
- Australian Open: 2R (1988)
- Wimbledon: 3R (1988)
- US Open: 3R (1986)

Doubles
- Career record: 9–28
- Career titles: 0
- Highest ranking: No. 163 (24 November 1986)

Grand Slam doubles results
- Australian Open: 1R (1988)
- Wimbledon: 1R (1981, 1982)

Barry Moir (born 1 June 1963) is a retired tennis player from South Africa. His highest ranking was 92 in the world, obtained in 1986. He is the brother of Kevin Moir.

== Challenger titles ==
=== Singles: (3) ===
No.	Year	Tournament	Surface	Opponent	Score
1.	1985	Winnetka, United States	Hard	(United States) Harold Solomon	2–6, 7–5, 6–2
2.	1988	Vilamoura, Portugal	Hard	(Canada) Stéphane Bonneau	6–1, 6–2
3.	1988	Raleigh, United States	Clay	(Sweden) Tobias Svantesson	6–1, 6–2

=== Doubles: (1) ===
No.	Year	Tournament	Surface	Partner	Opponents	Score
1.	1987	Estoril, Portugal	Clay	(Italy) Gianluca Pozzi	(Israel) Gilad Bloom (Sweden) Niclas Kroon	6–4, 3–6, 7–6
