= 1988 Australian Open – Mixed doubles =

Mixed doubles
- 1988 Australian Open

Final
- Champions: (Czechoslovakia) Jana Novotná (United States) Jim Pugh
- Runners-up: (United States) Martina Navratilova (United States) Tim Gullikson
- Score: 5–7, 6–2, 6–4

Details
- Draw: 32
- Seeds: 8

Events
Singles	men	women		boys	girls
Doubles	men	women	mixed	boys	girls
WC Singles	men	women	quad
WC Doubles	men	women	quad
Legends	men	women	mixed
- Australian Open

Zina Garrison and Sherwood Stewart were the defending champions but lost in the first round to Louise Field and Brad Drewett.

Jana Novotná and Jim Pugh won in the final 5–7, 6–2, 6–4 against Martina Navratilova and Tim Gullikson.

== Seeds ==
Champion seeds are indicated in bold text while text in italics indicates the round in which those seeds were eliminated.

1. (United States) Lori McNeil / (France) Guy Forget (first round)
2. (Australia) Elizabeth Smylie / (Australia) John Fitzgerald (quarterfinals)
3. (Australia) Wendy Turnbull / (Australia) Peter Doohan (first round)
4. (United States) Zina Garrison / (United States) Sherwood Stewart (first round)
5. (Czechoslovakia) **Jana Novotná** / (United States) **Jim Pugh (champions)**
6. (Australia) Jenny Byrne / (Australia) Kim Warwick (first round)
7. n/a
8. (United States) Candy Reynolds / (United States) Chip Hooper (first round)

== Draw ==
Key

- Q = Qualifier
- WC = Wild card
- LL = Lucky loser
- Alt = Alternate
- ITF = ITF entry
- PR = Protected ranking
- SR = Special ranking
- SE = Special exempt
- JE = Junior exempt
- JR = Junior Accelerator Programme entrant
- CO = College Accelerator Programme entrant
- NG = Next Gen Accelerator Program entrant
- w/o = Walkover
- r = Retired
- d = Defaulted

=== Final ===
Final
	(United States) Martina Navratilova (United States) Tim Gullikson	**7**	2	4
5	(Czechoslovakia) **Jana Novotná** (United States) **Jim Pugh**	5	**6**	**6**

=== Top half ===
First round
1	(United States) L McNeil (France) G Forget
(Australia) **J Tremelling** (Australia) **D Macpherson**	w/o
(United States) **A Henricksson** (Netherlands) **M Schapers**	**6**	3	**6**
(Australia) M Jaggard (Australia) M Woodforde	2	**6**	4
(Australia) **D Balestrat** (Australia) **C Limberger**	**6**	**7**
(South Africa) R Fairbank (United States) B Buffington	4	5
WC	(Australia) **J-A Faull** (Australia) **J Stoltenberg**	**7^{7}**	4	**13**
ALT	(United States) P Smith (United States) M Bauer	6^{5}	**6**	11
3	(Australia) W Turnbull (Australia) P Doohan	3	4
(United States) **M Navratilova** (United States) **T Gullikson**	**6**	**6**
(United States) **P Fendick** (United States) **R Leach**	**6**	4	**6**
(Australia) A Minter (Australia) M Kratzmann	4	**6**	0
(Netherlands) **C Bakkum** (Netherlands) **T Nijssen**	3	**6**	**6**
(United States) G Magers (United States) H Pfister	**6**	4	3
(New Zealand) **J Richardson** (New Zealand) **K Evernden**	**6**	**7**
6	(Australia) J Byrne (Australia) K Warwick	2	5

Second round
(Australia) **J Tremelling** (Australia) **D Macpherson**	5	**6**	**6**
(United States) A Henricksson (Netherlands) M Schapers	**7**	3	4
(Australia) **D Balestrat** (Australia) **C Limberger**	6^{5}	**6**	**6**
WC	(Australia) J-A Faull (Australia) J Stoltenberg	**7^{7}**	3	2
(United States) **M Navratilova** (United States) **T Gullikson**	**6**	**6**
(United States) P Fendick (United States) R Leach	3	2
(Netherlands) **C Bakkum** (Netherlands) **T Nijssen**	**6**	2	**6**
(New Zealand) J Richardson (New Zealand) K Evernden	4	**6**	3

Quarterfinals
(Australia) **J Tremelling** (Australia) **D Macpherson**	**7**	**6**
(Australia) D Balestrat (Australia) C Limberger	5	4
(United States) **M Navratilova** (United States) **T Gullikson**	**6**	**6**
(Netherlands) C Bakkum (Netherlands) T Nijssen	4	4

Semifinals
(Australia) J Tremelling (Australia) D Macpherson	3	2
(United States) **M Navratilova** (United States) **T Gullikson**	**6**	**6**

=== Bottom half ===
First round
5	(Czechoslovakia) **J Novotná** (United States) **J Pugh**	**7**	1
(United States) R White (United States) T Pawsat	5	0	r
(United States) B Potter (United States) L Scott	**7**	6^{6}	6
(France) **C Tanvier** (France) **J Potier**	5	**7^{8}**	**8**
(Hong Kong) P Hy (United States) P Chamberlin	6^{2}	3
(United States) **P Barg** (United States) **K Jones**	**7^{7}**	**6**
(Australia) **L Field** (Australia) **B Drewett**	**6**	**6**
4	(United States) Z Garrison (United States) S Stewart	3	3
8	(United States) C Reynolds (United States) C Hooper	5	3
(Australia) **N Provis** (Australia) **D Cahill**	**7**	**6**
(Netherlands) **M van der Torre** (United States) **M Davis**	**6**	3	**6**
(New Zealand) B Cordwell (New Zealand) D Lewis	4	**6**	2
(United States) A M Fernandez (Australia) P Carter	2	6^{2}
WC	(Australia) **R McQuillan** (Australia) **T Woodbridge**	**6**	**7^{7}**
(West Germany) C Porwik (Australia) L Warder	**6**	3	4
2	(Australia) **E Smylie** (Australia) **J Fitzgerald**	4	**6**	**6**

Second round
5	(Czechoslovakia) **J Novotná** (United States) **J Pugh**	**7^{7}**	**6**
(France) C Tanvier (France) J Potier	6^{3}	4
(United States) P Barg (United States) K Jones	3	**7^{7}**	r
(Australia) **L Field** (Australia) **B Drewett**	**6**	6^{3}
(Australia) N Provis (Australia) D Cahill	5	5
(Netherlands) **M van der Torre** (United States) **M Davis**	**7**	**7**
WC	(Australia) R McQuillan (Australia) T Woodbridge	4	2
2	(Australia) **E Smylie** (Australia) **J Fitzgerald**	**6**	**6**

Quarterfinals
5	(Czechoslovakia) **J Novotná** (United States) **J Pugh**	**6**	6^{11}	**9**
(Australia) L Field (Australia) B Drewett	3	**7^{13}**	7
(Netherlands) **M van der Torre** (United States) **M Davis**	**6**	**7^{7}**
2	(Australia) E Smylie (Australia) J Fitzgerald	4	6^{0}

Semifinals
5	(Czechoslovakia) **J Novotná** (United States) **J Pugh**	**6**	**7**
(Netherlands) M van der Torre (United States) M Davis	2	5
