= Ivo Werner =

- Country (sports): Czechoslovakia; West Germany
- Residence: Switzerland/Karlsruhe
- Born: 19 August 1960 (age 65); Krnov, Czechoslovakia
- Height: 1.80 m (5 ft 11 in)
- Plays: Right-handed
- Prize money: $33,382

Singles
- Career record: 5–12
- Career titles: 0
- Highest ranking: No. 175 (2 Feb 1987)

Grand Slam singles results
- Australian Open: 1R (1988)

Doubles
- Career record: 7–13
- Career titles: 0
- Highest ranking: No. 139 (25 Jan 1988)

Grand Slam doubles results
- Australian Open: 3R (1988)

Ivo Werner (born 19 August 1960) is a former professional tennis player originally from Czechoslovakia who competed for both his native country as well as West Germany. Werner, who is now a tennis coach, immigrated to West Germany in 1982 and acquired citizenship two years later.

== Tour career ==
Werner made his first Grand Prix quarter-final in 1986, at Metz. He was a quarter-finalist again the following year, at the Guarujá Open. Also in 1987, he reached the doubles semi-finals of the Heineken Open, with David Lewis as his partner.

At the 1988 Australian Open, Werner made it through qualifying and met world number 62 Michiel Schapers in the opening round of the main draw. He won the first two sets and twice served for the match in the third, but the match would go into a fifth set, which he lost 10–12. In the doubles, Werner and David Lewis reached the round of 16, where they were defeated by Andrew Castle and Roberto Saad. The match was another close one, decided 16–14 in the final set.

== Coaching ==
Werner is the current coach of the Switzerland Davis Cup team and was the coach of Petr Korda when the Czech player won the 1998 Australian Open.
