= Paul Chamberlin =

American tennis player

- Country (sports): United States
- Born: March 26, 1962 (age 63); Toledo, Ohio, United States
- Height: 1.78 m (5 ft 10 in)
- Turned pro: 1986
- Retired: 1991
- Plays: Right-handed
- Prize money: $409,421

Singles
- Career record: 57–65
- Career titles: 0; 0 Challenger, 0 Futures
- Highest ranking: No. 46 (1 January 1990)

Grand Slam singles results
- Australian Open: 3R (1988, 1990)
- Wimbledon: QF (1989)
- US Open: 1R (1989, 1990)

Doubles
- Career record: 48–71
- Career titles: 1; 1 Challenger, 0 Futures
- Highest ranking: No. 61 (26 February 1990)

Grand Slam doubles results
- Australian Open: 3R (1988, 1990)
- French Open: 2R (1987)
- Wimbledon: 2R (1986, 1987, 1988)
- US Open: 2R (1990)

Grand Slam mixed doubles results
- Australian Open: 1R (1988)
- French Open: 3R (1987)
- Wimbledon: 1R (1987, 1988)
- Last updated on: 15 April 2022.

Paul Chamberlin (born March 26, 1962) is a former professional tennis player from the United States.

Chamberlin won one doubles title (1989, Bristol) during his career. After playing college tennis at the University of Arizona, the right-hander reached his highest ATP singles ranking of World No. 46 in January 1990.

Chamberlin made the quarterfinals at Wimbledon in 1989, beating Gary Muller, Thomas Högstedt, Nick Fulwood and Leif Shiras before losing to eventual champion Boris Becker.

== ATP career finals ==
=== Singles: 1 (1 runner-up) ===
Legend Grand Slam Tournaments (0–0) ATP World Tour Finals (0–0) ATP Masters Series (0–0) ATP Championship Series (0–0) ATP World Series (0–1)	Finals by surface Hard (0–1) Clay (0–0) Grass (0–0) Carpet (0–0)	Finals by setting Outdoors (0–0) Indoors (0–1)

Result	W–L	Date	Tournament	Tier	Surface	Opponent	Score
Loss	0–1	Nov 1989	Johannesburg, South Africa	World Series	Hard	(South Africa) Christo van Rensburg	4–6, 6–7, 3–6

=== Doubles: 2 (1 title, 1 runner-up) ===
Legend Grand Slam Tournaments (0–0) ATP World Tour Finals (0–0) ATP Masters Series (0–0) ATP Championship Series (0–0) ATP Grand Prix (1–1)	Finals by surface Hard (0–1) Clay (0–0) Grass (1–0) Carpet (0–0)	Finals by setting Outdoors (1–1) Indoors (0–0)

Result	W–L	Date	Tournament	Tier	Surface	Partner	Opponents	Score
Loss	0–1	Apr 1989	Singapore, Singapore	Grand Prix	Hard	(Kenya) Paul Wekesa	(United States) Rick Leach (United States) Jim Pugh	3–6, 4–6
Win	1–1	Jun 1989	Bristol, United Kingdom	Grand Prix	Grass	(United States) Tim Wilkison	(United States) Mike De Palmer (United States) Gary Donnelly	7–6, 6–4

== ATP Challenger and ITF Futures finals ==
=== Doubles: 1 (1–0) ===
Legend ATP Challenger (1–0) ITF Futures (0–0)	Finals by surface Hard (1–0) Clay (0–0) Grass (0–0) Carpet (0–0)

Result	W–L	Date	Tournament	Tier	Surface	Partner	Opponents	Score
Win	1–0	Mar 1987	Cherbourg, France	Challenger	Hard	(United States) Leif Shiras	(United States) Jim Pugh (France) Eric Winogradsky	7–5, 7–5

== Performance timelines ==
Key
W	F	SF	QF	#R	RR	Q#	DNQ	A	NH

(W) winner; (F) finalist; (SF) semifinalist; (QF) quarterfinalist; (#R) rounds 4, 3, 2, 1; (RR) round-robin stage; (Q#) qualification round; (DNQ) did not qualify; (A) absent; (NH) not held; (SR) strike rate (events won / competed); (W–L) win–loss record.

=== Singles ===
Tournament	1986	1987	1988	1989	1990	SR	W–L	Win %
Grand Slam tournaments
Australian Open	A	A	3R	2R	3R	0 / 3	5–3	63%
French Open	A	A	A	A	A	0 / 0	0–0	–
Wimbledon	1R	A	A	QF	2R	0 / 3	5–3	63%
US Open	A	A	A	1R	1R	0 / 2	0–2	0%
Win–loss	0–1	0–0	2–1	5–3	3–3	0 / 8	10–8	56%
ATP Masters Series
Indian Wells	A	A	A	A	1R	0 / 1	0–1	0%
Miami	A	1R	1R	A	2R	0 / 3	1–3	25%
Canada	A	A	A	A	2R	0 / 1	1–1	50%
Cincinnati	A	2R	1R	A	1R	0 / 3	1–3	25%
Win–loss	0–0	1–2	0–2	0–0	2–4	0 / 8	3–8	27%

=== Doubles ===
Tournament	1986	1987	1988	1989	1990	SR	W–L	Win %
Grand Slam tournaments
Australian Open	A	A	3R	2R	3R	0 / 3	5–3	63%
French Open	A	2R	1R	A	A	0 / 2	1–2	33%
Wimbledon	2R	2R	2R	A	1R	0 / 4	3–4	43%
US Open	A	1R	1R	1R	2R	0 / 4	1–4	20%
Win–loss	1–1	2–3	3–4	1–2	3–3	0 / 13	10–13	43%
ATP Masters Series
Indian Wells	A	A	1R	A	1R	0 / 2	0–2	0%
Miami	A	A	1R	A	1R	0 / 2	0–2	0%
Rome	A	A	1R	A	A	0 / 1	0–1	0%
Canada	A	A	2R	A	1R	0 / 2	1–2	33%
Cincinnati	A	1R	1R	A	A	0 / 2	0–2	0%
Win–loss	0–0	0–1	1–5	0–0	0–3	0 / 9	1–9	10%
