= Charlton Eagle =

Australian tennis player

- Country (sports): Australia
- Residence: Arlington, Texas
- Born: 30 November 1963 (age 62) Johannesburg, South Africa
- Height: 5 ft 11 in (180 cm)
- Turned pro: 1986
- Plays: Right-handed
- Prize money: $29,981

Singles
- Career record: 1-7
- Career titles: 0
- Highest ranking: No. 255 (22 Jun 1987)

Grand Slam singles results
- Australian Open: 1R (1987, 1988)

Doubles
- Career record: 1-3
- Career titles: 0
- Highest ranking: No. 286 (12 Oct 1987)

Grand Slam doubles results
- Australian Open: 1R (1988)

Charlton Eagle (born 30 November 1963) is a former professional tennis player from Australia.

== Career ==
In 1987, Eagle qualified for his first Australian Open and faced American Marty Davis in the first round. Eagle lost in straight sets. His second and final Grand Slam appearance came at the 1988 Australian Open, where he was beaten in the opening round by sixth seed Anders Järryd.

Eagle's only win on the Grand Prix tour was over Britain's James Turner, at the 1987 Bristol Open. The highest ranked opponent that he had during his career was Boris Becker, who he played against at the 1988 Stella Artois Championships (Queen's).

Since retiring, Eagle has been involved coaching after retiring from the tour. He has coached the Australia Fed Cup team and was head coach of South Africa's tennis squad 2000 Sydney Olympics.

== Personal ==
Born in Johannesburg, Eagle immigrated to Australia when he was 13.

Eagle, who played college tennis at Baylor University, now lives in Florida and represents the United States on the senior's tennis circuit.

== Challenger titles ==
=== Doubles: (1) ===
No.	Year	Tournament	Surface	Partner	Opponents in the final	Score in the final
1.	1988	Tasmania, Australia	Carpet	(Australia) Paul Mick	(Australia) Shane Barr (Australia) Roger Rasheed	7–6, 4–6, 7–6
