= Bryan Roe =

Australian priest at St Benedict's and ex-tennis player

- Country (sports): Australia
- Born: 20 August 1969 (age 56) Brisbane, Australia
- Height: 6 ft 6 in (198 cm)
- Plays: Left-handed

Singles
- Career record: 0–3
- Highest ranking: No. 486 (15 February 1988)

Grand Slam singles results
- Australian Open: 1R (1988)

Doubles
- Career record: 1–2
- Highest ranking: No. 379 (7 November 1988)

Grand Slam doubles results
- Australian Open: 2R (1988)

Bryan Roe (born 20 August 1969) is an Australian priest and former professional tennis player.

== Tennis career ==
Roe, a left-handed Queenslander who played a serve and volley game, was an Australian Open junior doubles runner-up in 1987, partnering Shane Barr.

His tennis career is most noted for his main draw appearance at the 1988 Australian Open, where on grand slam debut he faced Ivan Lendl on centre court in what was the tournament's first night session at the new Flinders Park venue. Roe was competitive against the top-seeded Czechoslovak and held a set point during the second set.

Following his appearance at the 1988 Australian Open he suffered from a series of illnesses which brought an early end to his tennis career. Immediately after the tournament he was admitted to the hospital with a burst appendix and peritonitis. A bowel condition then kept him out of tennis for a year and most seriously, in 1989, he was diagnosed with Guillain–Barré syndrome.

== Priesthood journey ==
Ordained to the priesthood in 2010, Roe is the parish priest for St Benedict's in North Lakes, Queensland.
