= David Macpherson (tennis) =

Australian tennis player

- Country (sports): Australia
- Born: 3 July 1967 (age 59) Launceston, Tasmania, Australia
- Height: 175 cm (5 ft 9 in)
- Turned pro: 1985
- Retired: 2003
- Plays: Left handed
- Prize money: $1,729,899

Singles
- Career record: 0–13
- Career titles: 0; 0 Challenger, 0 Futures
- Highest ranking: No. 293 (5 March 1990)

Grand Slam singles results
- Australian Open: 2R (1987)
- Wimbledon: Q3 (1989)

Doubles
- Career record: 388–395
- Career titles: 16; 7 Challenger, 0 Futures
- Highest ranking: No. 11 (2 November 1992)

Grand Slam doubles results
- Australian Open: SF (1998)
- French Open: 3R (1991, 1996, 1998)
- Wimbledon: QF (1998, 2002)
- US Open: QF (1991, 1996, 2000)

Other doubles tournaments
- Tour Finals: SF (1996)

Grand Slam mixed doubles results
- Australian Open: SF (1988, 1992)
- French Open: SF (1985, 1998)
- Wimbledon: 3R (1994, 1996, 1998)
- US Open: SF (1996)

Coaching career (2005–)
- Bob Bryan (2005–2016, 2017–2020); Mike Bryan (2005–2016, 2017–2020); John Isner (2018–2023)

Coaching achievements
- List of notable tournaments (with champion): (United States) 2007 Davis Cup champions (Bryan brothers); List of titles (from August 2005)
- Last updated on: 10 August 2022.

David Macpherson (born 3 July 1967) is a former professional male tennis player on the ATP Tour. He was the former coach of John Isner and Bob and Mike Bryan.

A product of player and coach, Tony Roche's junior tennis academy, he played lefthanded and turned professional in 1985. As a junior player Macpherson was one of Australia's top prospects in his peer group, reaching the U.S. Open Junior Doubles Tournament finals in 1983 and winning the Australia Open Junior Doubles title in 1985 (with Brett Custer).

Known primarily as a doubles specialist, Macpherson's professional career was highlighted by his 1992 season with partner, Steve DeVries, where they won doubles titles in Milan, Manchester, Indian Wells, Atlanta, Charlotte and Brisbane to finish No. 8 in the year end Team Rankings and qualifying for ATP Tour World Doubles Championships.

In November of that year he achieved his high personal rank of No. 11 in the doubles ranking. During his career, Macpherson captured 16 doubles titles on the ATP tour and earned over US$1.7 million in career earnings.

Throughout his pro career, Macpherson was a regular player in World TeamTennis league for the Sacramento and Kansas City Explorers franchises.

Macpherson coached arguably the greatest doubles pair in the history of tennis, Mike and Bob Bryan, from 2005 through 2016. He is now the head coach of The George Washington University's men's tennis team.

== Junior Grand Slam finals ==
=== Doubles: 1 (1 runner-up) ===
| Result | Year | Championship | Surface | Partner | Opponents | Score |
|---|---|---|---|---|---|---|
| Loss | 1985 | US Open | Hard | (Australia) Patrick Flynn | (United States) Joey Blake (United States) Darren Yates | 6–3, 3–6, 4–6 |

== ATP career finals ==
=== Doubles: 29 (16 titles, 13 runner-ups) ===
| Legend Grand Slam Tournaments (0–0) ATP World Tour Finals (0–0) ATP Masters 1000 Series (1–1) ATP 500 Series (3–3) ATP 250 Series (12–9) | Finals by surface Hard (6–4) Clay (6–4) Grass (2–1) Carpet (2–4) | Finals by setting Outdoors (13–8) Indoors (3–5) |

| Result | W–L | Date | Tournament | Tier | Surface | Partner | Opponents | Score |
|---|---|---|---|---|---|---|---|---|
| Win | 1–0 | Feb 1990 | Toronto, Canada | Championship Series | Carpet | (United States) Patrick Galbraith | (United Kingdom) Neil Broad (United States) Kevin Curren | 2–6, 6–4, 6–3 |
| Loss | 1–1 | Mar 1991 | Rotterdam, Netherlands | World Series | Carpet | (United States) Steve DeVries | (United States) Patrick Galbraith (Sweden) Anders Järryd | 6–7, 2–6 |
| Loss | 1–2 | Oct 1991 | Lyon, France | World Series | Carpet | (United States) Steve DeVries | (Netherlands) Tom Nijssen (Czech Republic) Cyril Suk | 6–7, 3–6 |
| Win | 2–2 | Feb 1992 | Milan, Italy | World Series | Carpet | (United Kingdom) Neil Broad | (Spain) Sergio Casal (Spain) Emilio Sánchez | 5–7, 7–5, 6–4 |
| Win | 3–2 | Mar 1992 | Indian Wells, United States | Masters Series | Hard | (United States) Steve DeVries | (United States) Kent Kinnear (United States) Sven Salumaa | 4–6, 6–3, 6–3 |
| Win | 4–2 | May 1992 | Atlanta, United States | World Series | Clay | (United States) Steve DeVries | (United States) Mark Keil (United States) Dave Randall | 6–3, 6–3 |
| Win | 5–2 | May 1992 | Charlotte, United States | World Series | Clay | (United States) Steve DeVries | (United States) Bret Garnett (United States) Jared Palmer | 6–4, 7–6 |
| Win | 6–2 | Jun 1992 | Manchester, United Kingdom | World Series | Grass | (United States) Patrick Galbraith | (United Kingdom) Jeremy Bates (Australia) Laurie Warder | 4–6, 6–3, 6–2 |
| Win | 7–2 | Oct 1992 | Brisbane, Australia | World Series | Hard | (United States) Steve DeVries | (United States) Patrick McEnroe (United States) Jonathan Stark | 6–4, 6–4 |
| Loss | 7–3 | Nov 1992 | Stockholm, Sweden | Masters Series | Carpet | (United States) Steve DeVries | (Australia) Todd Woodbridge (Australia) Mark Woodforde | 3–6, 4–6 |
| Loss | 7–4 | Feb 1993 | Stuttgart Indoor, Germany | Championship Series | Carpet | (United States) Steve DeVries | (Australia) Mark Kratzmann (Australia) Wally Masur | 3–6, 6–7 |
| Win | 8–4 | Apr 1993 | Nice, France | World Series | Clay | (Australia) Laurie Warder | (United States) Shelby Cannon (United States) Scott Melville | 3–4 ret. |
| Loss | 8–5 | Aug 1993 | New Haven, United States | Championship Series | Hard | (United States) Steve DeVries | (Czech Republic) Cyril Suk (Czech Republic) Daniel Vacek | 3–6, 6–7 |
| Loss | 8–6 | Jan 1995 | Sydney, Australia | World Series | Hard | (United States) Trevor Kronemann | (Australia) Todd Woodbridge (Australia) Mark Woodforde | 6–7, 4–6 |
| Win | 9–6 | Mar 1995 | Scottsdale, United States | World Series | Hard | (United States) Trevor Kronemann | (Argentina) Luis Lobo (Spain) Javier Sánchez | 4–6, 6–3, 6–4 |
| Win | 10–6 | Apr 1995 | Barcelona, Spain | Championship Series | Clay | (United States) Trevor Kronemann | (Croatia) Goran Ivanišević (Italy) Andrea Gaudenzi | 6–2, 6–4 |
| Win | 11–6 | May 1995 | Munich, Germany | World Series | Clay | (United States) Trevor Kronemann | (Argentina) Luis Lobo (Spain) Javier Sánchez | 6–3, 6–4 |
| Win | 12–6 | Feb 1996 | San Jose, United States | World Series | Hard | (United States) Trevor Kronemann | (United States) Richey Reneberg (United States) Jonathan Stark | 6–4, 3–6, 6–3 |
| Loss | 12–7 | Jul 1996 | Gstaad, Switzerland | World Series | Clay | (United States) Trevor Kronemann | (Argentina) Luis Lobo (Spain) Javier Sánchez | 6–4, 6–7, 6–7 |
| Loss | 12–8 | Jun 1997 | Rosmalen, Netherlands | World Series | Grass | (United States) Trevor Kronemann | (Netherlands) Jacco Eltingh (Netherlands) Paul Haarhuis | 4–6, 5–7 |
| Loss | 12–9 | Jul 1997 | Gstaad, Switzerland | World Series | Clay | (United States) Trevor Kronemann | (Czech Republic) Daniel Vacek (Russia) Yevgeny Kafelnikov | 6–4, 6–7, 3–6 |
| Loss | 12–10 | Mar 1998 | Philadelphia, United States | Championship Series | Hard | (United States) Richey Reneberg | (Netherlands) Jacco Eltingh (Netherlands) Paul Haarhuis | 6–7, 7–6, 2–6 |
| Win | 13–10 | May 1998 | St. Pölten, Austria | World Series | Clay | (United States) Jim Grabb | (South Africa) David Adams (Zimbabwe) Wayne Black | 6–4, 6–4 |
| Loss | 13–11 | Mar 2000 | Scottsdale, United States | International Series | Hard | (United States) Patrick Galbraith | (United States) Jared Palmer (United States) Richey Reneberg | 3–6, 5–7 |
| Win | 14–11 | Jan 2001 | Adelaide, Australia | International Series | Hard | (South Africa) Grant Stafford | (Australia) Wayne Arthurs (Australia) Todd Woodbridge | 6–7, 6–4, 6–4 |
| Loss | 14–12 | Apr 2001 | Casablanca, Morocco | International Series | Clay | (Argentina) Pablo Albano | (Australia) Michael Hill (United States) Jeff Tarango | 6–7, 3–6 |
| Loss | 14–13 | Apr 2001 | Atlanta, United States | International Series | Clay | (United States) Rick Leach | (India) Mahesh Bhupathi (India) Leander Paes | 3–6, 6–7 |
| Win | 15–3 | Oct 2001 | Tokyo, Japan | Championship Series | Hard | (United States) Rick Leach | (Australia) Paul Hanley (Australia) Nathan Healey | 1–6, 7–6, 7–6 |
| Win | 16–13 | Jul 2003 | Newport, United States | International Series | Grass | (Australia) Jordan Kerr | (Austria) Julian Knowle (Austria) Jürgen Melzer | 7–6, 6–3 |

== ATP Challenger and ITF Futures finals ==
=== Doubles: 9 (7–2) ===
| Legend ATP Challenger (7–2) ITF Futures (0–0) | Finals by surface Hard (2–0) Clay (3–2) Grass (0–0) Carpet (2–0) |

| Result | W–L | Date | Tournament | Tier | Surface | Partner | Opponents | Score |
|---|---|---|---|---|---|---|---|---|
| Win | 1–0 | Jul 1989 | São Paulo, Brazil | Challenger | Clay | (Argentina) Gerardo Mirad | (Brazil) Otavio Della (Brazil) Jaime Oncins | 2–6, 7–6, 6–2 |
| Loss | 1–1 | Jul 1989 | Santos, Brazil | Challenger | Clay | (Argentina) Gerardo Mirad | (Chile) Cristian Araya (Chile) Pedro Rebolledo | 4–6, 6–4, 4–6 |
| Win | 2–1 | Aug 1989 | Lins, Brazil | Challenger | Clay | (Argentina) Gerardo Mirad | (Portugal) João Cunha-Silva (Brazil) Ivan Kley | 2–6, 6–3, 6–2 |
| Win | 3–1 | Aug 1989 | Brasília, Brazil | Challenger | Carpet | (Argentina) Horacio de la Peña | (Brazil) Luis Ruette (Brazil) João Soares | 6–3, 7–5 |
| Loss | 3–2 | Sep 1989 | Nyon, Switzerland | Challenger | Clay | (Portugal) João Cunha-Silva | (United Kingdom) Nicholas Fulwood (Czechoslovakia) Libor Pimek | 7–6, 6–7, 4–6 |
| Win | 4–2 | Nov 1990 | Hobart, Australia | Challenger | Carpet | (Australia) Brett Custer | (New Zealand) Brett Steven (Australia) Sandon Stolle | 6–2, 6–7, 6–4 |
| Win | 5–2 | Oct 1994 | Brest, France | Challenger | Hard | (United States) Trevor Kronemann | (United States) Bryan Shelton (South Africa) Kevin Ullyett | 6–1, 6–4 |
| Win | 6–2 | Dec 1994 | Naples, United States | Challenger | Clay | (United States) Trevor Kronemann | (South Africa) Marcos Ondruska (South Africa) Grant Stafford | 6–3, 7–6 |
| Win | 7–2 | Dec 2001 | Rio de Janeiro, Brazil | Challenger | Hard | (United States) Justin Gimelstob | (Austria) Julian Knowle (Germany) Michael Kohlmann | 7–6^{(7–5)}, 6–3 |

== Performance timelines ==
Key
| W | F | SF | QF | #R | RR | Q# | DNQ | A | NH |

(W) winner; (F) finalist; (SF) semifinalist; (QF) quarterfinalist; (#R) rounds 4, 3, 2, 1; (RR) round-robin stage; (Q#) qualification round; (DNQ) did not qualify; (A) absent; (NH) not held; (SR) strike rate (events won / competed); (W–L) win–loss record.

=== Singles ===
| Tournament | 1983 | 1984 | 1985 | 1986 | 1987 | 1988 | 1989 | 1990 | 1991 | 1992 | 1993 | 1994 | 1995 | 1996 | SR | W–L | Win % |
|---|---|---|---|---|---|---|---|---|---|---|---|---|---|---|---|---|---|
Grand Slam tournaments
| Australian Open | 1R | Q1 | 1R | A | 2R | Q2 | Q2 | 1R | Q1 | Q1 | Q1 | A | A | A | 0 / 4 | 0–4 | 0% |
| French Open | A | A | A | A | A | A | A | A | A | A | A | A | A | A | 0 / 0 | 0–0 | – |
| Wimbledon | A | Q1 | A | Q1 | Q1 | Q2 | Q3 | Q1 | A | A | A | A | A | A | 0 / 0 | 0–0 | – |
| US Open | A | A | A | A | A | A | A | A | A | A | A | A | A | A | 0 / 0 | 0–0 | – |
| Win–loss | 0–1 | 0–0 | 0–1 | 0–0 | 0–1 | 0–0 | 0–0 | 0–1 | 0–0 | 0–0 | 0–0 | 0–0 | 0–0 | 0–0 | 0 / 4 | 0–4 | 0% |
ATP Masters Series
| Canada | A | A | A | A | 1R | A | A | A | A | A | A | A | A | A | 0 / 1 | 0–1 | 0% |
| Cincinnati | A | A | A | A | A | A | A | A | A | A | A | A | A | Q1 | 0 / 0 | 0–0 | – |
| Win–loss | 0–0 | 0–0 | 0–0 | 0–0 | 0–1 | 0–0 | 0–0 | 0–0 | 0–0 | 0–0 | 0–0 | 0–0 | 0–0 | 0–0 | 0 / 1 | 0–1 | 0% |

=== Doubles ===
| Tournament | 1983 | 1984 | 1985 | 1986 | 1987 | 1988 | 1989 | 1990 | 1991 | 1992 | 1993 | 1994 | 1995 | 1996 | 1997 | 1998 | 1999 | 2000 | 2001 | 2002 | SR | W–L | Win % |
|---|---|---|---|---|---|---|---|---|---|---|---|---|---|---|---|---|---|---|---|---|---|---|---|
Grand Slam tournaments
| Australian Open | 1R | 2R | 3R | A | 2R | 2R | A | 1R | 2R | 1R | 3R | 2R | 3R | 2R | 2R | SF | 2R | 3R | 1R | 2R | 0 / 18 | 21–18 | 54% |
| French Open | A | A | A | A | 1R | 1R | A | 1R | 3R | 2R | 1R | 1R | 1R | 3R | 2R | 3R | 1R | 2R | 1R | 1R | 0 / 15 | 9–15 | 38% |
| Wimbledon | A | A | A | A | Q1 | 1R | Q1 | 2R | 2R | 3R | 1R | 3R | 2R | 1R | 2R | QF | 2R | 1R | 1R | QF | 0 / 14 | 15–14 | 52% |
| US Open | A | A | A | A | 1R | A | A | 2R | QF | 2R | 2R | 2R | 2R | QF | 3R | 2R | 2R | QF | 2R | 2R | 0 / 14 | 20–14 | 59% |
| Win–loss | 0–1 | 1–1 | 2–1 | 0–0 | 1–3 | 1–3 | 0–0 | 2–4 | 7–4 | 4–4 | 3–4 | 4–4 | 4–4 | 6–4 | 5–4 | 10–4 | 3–4 | 6–4 | 1–4 | 5–4 | 0 / 61 | 65–61 | 52% |
Year-end Championships
| ATP Finals | Did not qualify | | | | | | | | | RR | DNQ | | | SF | Did not qualify | | | | | | 0 / 2 | 2–5 | 29% |
ATP Masters Series
| Indian Wells | A | A | A | A | A | A | A | QF | A | W | 1R | 1R | 2R | SF | 1R | 1R | SF | 1R | QF | 2R | 1 / 12 | 17–11 | 61% |
| Miami | A | A | A | A | A | 1R | A | 3R | 2R | 3R | QF | 3R | 2R | 3R | 2R | 3R | QF | 2R | 1R | 1R | 0 / 14 | 13–14 | 48% |
| Monte Carlo | A | A | A | A | A | A | A | 2R | 1R | A | 2R | 1R | 2R | QF | 1R | QF | 1R | 1R | 2R | 2R | 0 / 12 | 8–12 | 40% |
| Hamburg | A | A | A | A | A | A | A | 2R | 2R | A | QF | 1R | QF | QF | QF | 1R | 1R | 1R | 1R | A | 0 / 11 | 9–11 | 45% |
| Rome | A | A | A | A | A | A | A | 1R | 1R | 1R | 2R | 2R | 1R | 1R | 1R | 1R | 1R | A | 2R | A | 0 / 11 | 3–11 | 21% |
| Canada | A | A | A | A | 2R | A | A | QF | 1R | A | A | A | A | A | SF | 1R | 2R | 2R | 1R | 1R | 0 / 9 | 8–9 | 47% |
| Cincinnati | A | A | A | A | 2R | A | A | 1R | QF | 2R | 1R | A | 1R | 1R | 2R | 1R | SF | 1R | A | 1R | 0 / 12 | 8–12 | 40% |
| Stuttgart | A | A | A | A | A | A | A | A | A | A | A | A | A | A | A | A | A | 1R | A | NMS | 0 / 1 | 0–1 | 0% |
| Paris | A | A | A | A | A | A | A | 2R | 2R | 1R | 1R | A | 2R | 2R | QF | QF | A | 1R | 1R | A | 0 / 10 | 8–10 | 44% |
| Win–loss | 0–0 | 0–0 | 0–0 | 0–0 | 2–2 | 0–1 | 0–0 | 8–8 | 5–7 | 7–4 | 4–7 | 3–5 | 6–7 | 9–7 | 9–8 | 5–8 | 9–7 | 1–8 | 4–7 | 2–5 | 1 / 92 | 74–91 | 45% |

=== Mixed doubles ===
| Tournament | 1986 | 1987 | 1988 | 1989 | 1990 | 1991 | 1992 | 1993 | 1994 | 1995 | 1996 | 1997 | 1998 | 1999 | 2000 | 2001 | 2002 | SR | W–L | Win % |
|---|---|---|---|---|---|---|---|---|---|---|---|---|---|---|---|---|---|---|---|---|
Grand Slam tournaments
| Australian Open | A | A | SF | QF | A | 1R | SF | 2R | A | 2R | 2R | 1R | 2R | QF | 2R | A | A | 0 / 11 | 15–11 | 58% |
| French Open | A | A | 2R | A | 1R | QF | 3R | 3R | A | SF | 2R | QF | SF | 2R | 2R | A | A | 0 / 11 | 19–11 | 63% |
| Wimbledon | 2R | 1R | 2R | A | 1R | 1R | 1R | 2R | 3R | 1R | 3R | 1R | 3R | 2R | 2R | 1R | 2R | 0 / 16 | 12–16 | 43% |
| US Open | A | A | A | A | 2R | 1R | 2R | 1R | QF | A | SF | 2R | QF | 1R | A | A | 1R | 0 / 10 | 10–10 | 50% |
| Win–loss | 1–1 | 0–1 | 5–3 | 2–1 | 1–3 | 3–4 | 5–4 | 4–4 | 4–2 | 5–3 | 7–4 | 4–4 | 8–4 | 3–4 | 3–3 | 0–1 | 1–2 | 0 / 48 | 56–48 | 54% |
