= Anthony Lane (tennis) =

Australian tennis player

- Full name: Anthony Lane
- Country (sports): Australia
- Born: 31 May 1965 (age 61) Adelaide, Australia
- Plays: Right-handed
- Prize money: $20,065

Singles
- Career record: 1–6
- Highest ranking: No. 235 (9 February 1987)

Grand Slam singles results
- Australian Open: 1R (1987, 1988)

Doubles
- Career record: 2–8
- Highest ranking: No. 217 (29 October 1984)

Grand Slam doubles results
- Australian Open: 1R (1987, 1988)

Anthony Lane (born 31 May 1965) is a former professional tennis player from Australia.

== Biography ==
=== Tennis career ===
Born in Adelaide, Lane played on the professional circuit in the 1980s.

Lane, a right-handed player, was runner-up at a Challenger tournament in Nigeria in 1986, with wins over Jean-Philippe Fleurian and Todd Witsken.

On the Grand Prix circuit his best performance was a second round appearance at his home event, the 1987 South Australian Open.

He made his grand slam debut at the 1987 Australian Open as a wildcard and lost his first round match in five sets, to former top 10 player Bill Scanlon. The following year he made the Australian Open main draw again, this time as a qualifier, losing in the first round to Carl Limberger.

=== Coaching ===
Lane was appointed men’s tennis coach at the Australian Institute of Sport in 2006.

When Chris Guccione broke into the world's top 100 for the first time in 2007 it was with Lane as his coach. He has also been the coach of James Duckworth.
