= Chris Kennedy (tennis) =

American tennis player

- Country (sports): United States
- Born: September 14, 1963 (age 61); Danbury, Connecticut, U.S.
- Height: 6 ft 1 in (185 cm)
- Plays: Right-handed
- Prize money: $17,615

Singles
- Career record: 0–1
- Highest ranking: No. 301 (1 February 1988)

Grand Slam singles results
- Australian Open: 1R (1988)
- Wimbledon: Q2 (1986)

Doubles
- Career record: 4–14
- Highest ranking: No. 144 (July 7, 1986)

Grand Slam doubles results
- Australian Open: 2R (1987)
- Wimbledon: 2R (1986)
- US Open: 1R (1985, 1986)

Grand Slam mixed doubles results
- Australian Open: 1R (1987)

Chris Kennedy (born September 14, 1963) is an American former professional tennis player.

Kennedy, who was raised in Cary, North Carolina, was a state champion in junior tennis and a two-time All-American at Trinity University in Texas. He reached the round of 16 at the NCAA singles championships as a senior in 1985.

== Professional tour ==
In the late 1980s he played on the professional tennis tour, earning career high rankings of 301 in singles and 144 in doubles, with main draw appearances at the Australian Open, Wimbledon and US Open.

Kennedy qualified for his only grand slam singles main draw at the 1988 Australian Open, where he was beaten in the first round by 11th seed Peter Lundgren. At the 1986 Wimbledon Championships, Kennedy and Des Tyson had an opening round doubles win over 3-time grand slam champions Mark Edmondson and Kim Warwick.
