= Roger Rasheed =

Australian rules footballer, born 1968

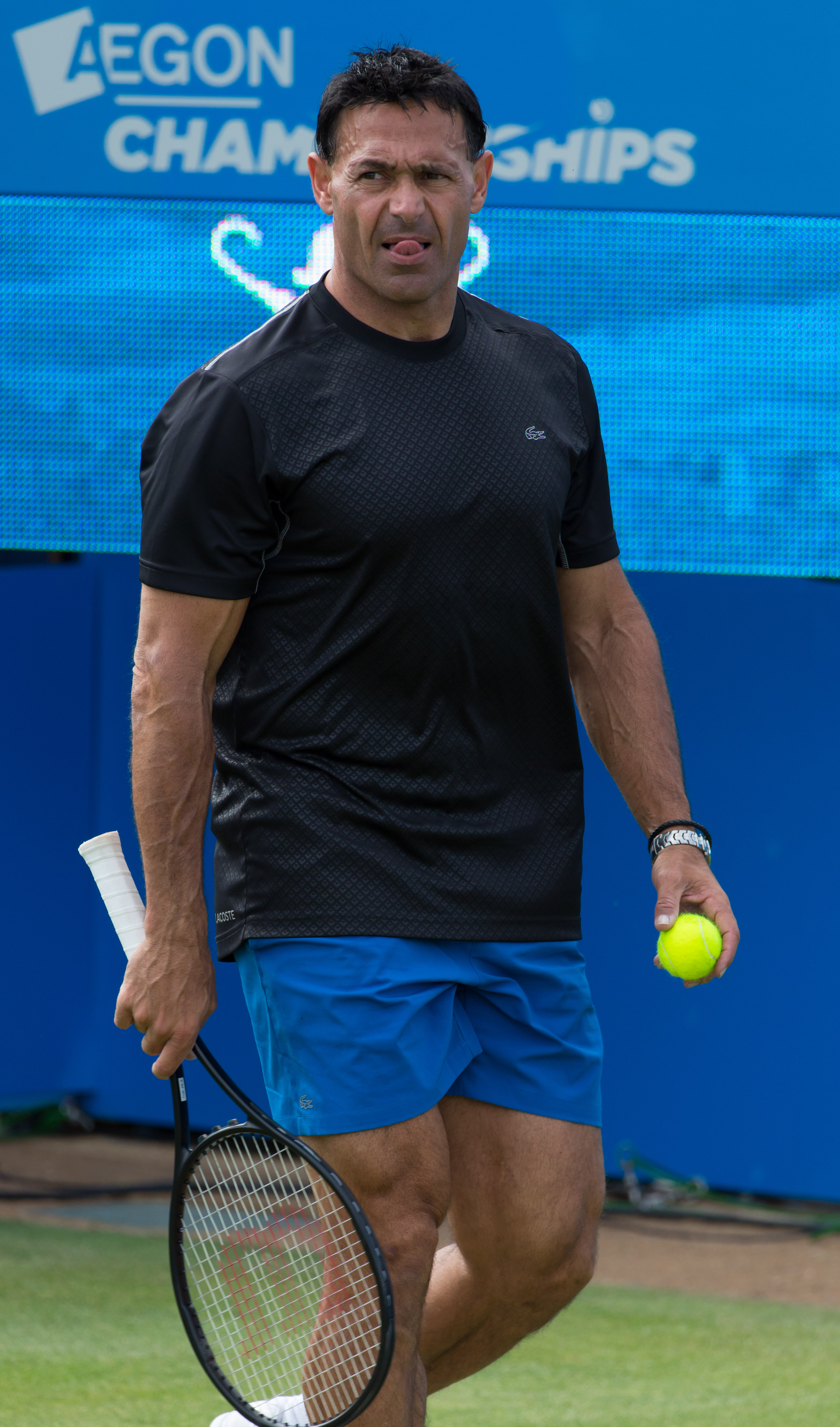
- Rasheed at the 2015 Aegon Championships in London, coaching Grigor Dimitrov
- Country (sports): Australia
- Born: 10 March 1969 (age 57) Adelaide, Australia
- Height: 6 ft (183 cm)
- Turned pro: 1989
- Retired: 2005
- Plays: Right-handed

Singles
- Career record: 5–6
- Career titles: 0
- Highest ranking: No. 192 (11 May 1992)

Grand Slam singles results
- Australian Open: 2R (1988, 1992)
- Wimbledon: Q3 (1988)
- US Open: Q2 (1992)

Doubles
- Career record: 4–14
- Career titles: 0; 4 Challengers
- Highest ranking: No. 134 (17 August 1992)

Coaching career (2003–)
- Lleyton Hewitt (2003–2007); Gaël Monfils (2008–2011); Jo-Wilfried Tsonga (2012–2013); Grigor Dimitrov (2013–2015)

Coaching achievements
- Coachee singles titles total: 6(H) + 2(M) + 1(T) + 4(D) = 13(total)
- List of notable tournaments (with champion) (Australia) 2003 Davis Cup champion (Hewitt)

Roger Rasheed (born 10 March 1969) is an Australian former Australian rules football player, tennis player, tennis coach and tennis commentator with the Seven Network. Rasheed is best known as the coach of Australian former world No. 1 and major champion Lleyton Hewitt, former world No. 6 Gaël Monfils, former world No. 5 Jo-Wilfried Tsonga, former world No. 3 Grigor Dimitrov, and for his website ProTennisCoach.com. In addition, he is the founder of the Roger Rasheed Sports Foundation.

== Career ==
=== Player ===
Prior to his work as a coach, Rasheed was the youngest ever player to qualify for an Australian Open in 1985 at 16 years of age, a feat eclipsed by Lleyton Hewitt, whom Rasheed later coached. Rasheed also competed in the ATP Challenger Series and won four titles in 1992. He reached number 192 in ATP rankings and number 132 in the doubles rankings in 1992.

=== Coaching ===
In Australia, Rasheed is notable as Lleyton Hewitt's coach from 2003 until 2007. During Rasheed's tenure as coach, Hewitt enjoyed significant domestic and international success, including becoming the first Australian in seventeen years to reach the Australian Open final and winning the 2006 Queen's Club Championships. Whilst Hewitt's coach, Rasheed also was the coach of the Australian Davis Cup team in 2006.

Rasheed then coached Gaël Monfils from July 2008 to July 2011 which coincided with Monfils rise in rankings from 38 to 7 in the ATP World Rankings. Since, Rasheed coached Frenchman and former Australian Open finalist Jo-Wilfried Tsonga between October 2012 and 2013. Tsonga achieved considerable success over this period, including defeating Roger Federer in straight sets at the French Open.

Since October 2013, Rasheed agreed to coach Bulgarian Grigor Dimitrov, the most successful Bulgarian male tennis player, both in financial and ranking terms, in history. Dimitrov credited Rasheed for his success in the 2014 Australian Open. Following a run of poor results in 2015, which culminated in a straight-sets defeat to Richard Gasquet at Wimbledon, Rasheed parted ways with Dimitrov.

==== ProTennisCoach.com ====
With Paul Annacone, Brad Gilbert and Darren Cahill, Rasheed developed ProTennisCoach.com — a professional and open coaching website launched in 2013.

=== Media ===
Rasheed regularly commentated both men's and women's matches in the Australian Open for the Seven Network between 2007 and 2018. In particular, Rasheed was known for his court-side commentary and special analysis.

He now works for the broadcaster Nine Network whilst working for the Tennis Australia world feed in an expert commentary role. In 2024 he worked for the Australian Broadcasting Corporation in their radio commentary.

=== Foundation ===
In addition, Rasheed has launched the Roger Rasheed Sports Foundation a not for profit organisation which focuses on children's health across socioeconomic and geographic boundaries. Greg Norman is the Foundation's patron. The organisation's first project is developing the Rajah Street Community Reserve in the City of Marion, Adelaide.

== Personal life ==
Roger was born to Druze immigrants Najeeb Rasheed and Ibithaj Majid. His father was born in Beit Mery in 1934. He is Australian of Lebanese descent. Born in Adelaide, Rasheed played Australian rules football, including seven games in the South Australian National Football League (SANFL) with the Sturt Football Club. He also tried to coach the Pembroke School football team. He is a keen supporter of the Port Adelaide Football Club in the Australian Football League (AFL).

He is the father of India Rasheed, a player in the AFL Women's (AFLW).

== Challenger finals ==
=== Doubles: 5 (4–1) ===
Legend
ATP Challenger Tour (4–1)

Outcome	No.	Date	Tournament	Surface	Partner	Opponents	Score
Runner-up	1.	26 November 1989	Hobart, Australia	Carpet	(Australia) Carl Turich	(Australia) Jamie Morgan (Australia) Todd Woodbridge	6–7, 6–7
Winner	1.	17 May 1992	Antwerp, Belgium	Clay	(Australia) Michael Brown	(Sweden) Mikael Pernfors (Belgium) Kris Goossens	6–2, 6–4
Winner	2.	5 July 1992	Salerno, Italy	Clay	(Australia) Andrew Kratzmann	(Argentina) Daniel Orsanic (Argentina) Gabriel Markus	6–4, 6–3
Winner	3.	2 August 1992	Winnetka, United States	Hard	(Australia) Andrew Kratzmann	(United States) Rick Witsken (United States) Todd Witsken	6–3, 3–6, 6–3
Winner	4.	16 August 1992	Fortaleza, Brazil	Hard	(Australia) Andrew Kratzmann	(Sweden) Christer Allgårdh (Venezuela) Maurice Ruah	7–6, 6–4
