= 1988 Australian Open =

- Date: 11–24 January 1988
- Edition: 76th
- Category: Grand Slam (ITF)
- Surface: Hardcourt (Rebound Ace)
- Location: Melbourne, Australia
- Venue: Flinders Park

Champions

Men's singles
- (Sweden) Mats Wilander

Women's singles
- (West Germany) Steffi Graf

Men's doubles
- (United States) Rick Leach / (United States) Jim Pugh

Women's doubles
- (United States) Martina Navratilova / (United States) Pam Shriver

Mixed doubles
- (Czechoslovakia) Jana Novotná / (United States) Jim Pugh

Boys' singles
- (Australia) Johan Anderson

Girls' singles
- (Australia) Jo-Anne Faull

Boys' doubles
- (Australia) Jason Stoltenberg / (Australia) Todd Woodbridge

Girls' doubles
- (Australia) Jo-Anne Faull / (Australia) Rachel McQuillan
← 1987 ·	Australian Open	· 1989 →

The 1988 Australian Open was a tennis tournament played on outdoor hard courts at Flinders Park in Melbourne in Victoria in Australia. It was the 76th edition of the Australian Open and was held from 11 through 24 January 1988 and was the first edition of the tournament hosted at Flinders Park. It would mark the first time a Grand Slam final would be played indoors under a roof; after the first 3 games of the Women's Final, there was a 1-hour & 23 min delay to close the roof.

This was the first Australian Open to have 128-players in each singles category, in line with the other three majors.

== Seniors ==
=== Men's singles ===
(Sweden) Mats Wilander defeated (Australia) Pat Cash 6–3, 6–7^{(3–7)}, 3–6, 6–1, 8–6

- It was Wilander's 5th career Grand Slam title and his 3rd and last Australian Open title.

=== Women's singles ===
(West Germany) Steffi Graf defeated (United States) Chris Evert 6–1, 7–6^{(7–3)}

- It was Graf's 2nd career Grand Slam title and her 1st Australian Open title. She became the first German player – male or female – to win an Australian Open singles title.

=== Men's doubles ===
(United States) Rick Leach / (United States) Jim Pugh defeated (United Kingdom) Jeremy Bates / (Sweden) Peter Lundgren 6–3, 6–2, 6–3

- It was Leach's 1st career Grand Slam title and his 1st Australian Open title. It was Pugh's 1st career Grand Slam title and his 1st Australian Open title.

=== Women's doubles ===
(United States) Martina Navratilova / (United States) Pam Shriver defeated (United States) Chris Evert / (Australia) Wendy Turnbull 6–0, 7–5

- It was Navratilova's 49th career Grand Slam title and her 10th Australian Open title. It was Shriver's 20th career Grand Slam title and her 7th Australian Open title.

=== Mixed doubles ===
(Czechoslovakia) Jana Novotná / (United States) Jim Pugh defeated (United States) Martina Navratilova / (United States) Tim Gullikson 5–7, 6–2, 6–4

- It was Novotná's 1st career Grand Slam title and her 1st Australian Open title. It was Pugh's 2nd career Grand Slam title and his 2nd Australian Open title.

== Juniors ==
=== Boys' singles ===
(Australia) Johan Anderson defeated (Australia) Andrew Florent 7–5, 7–6

=== Girls' singles ===
(Australia) Jo-Anne Faull defeated (France) Emmanuelle Derly 6–4, 6–4

=== Boys' doubles ===
(Australia) Jason Stoltenberg / (Australia) Todd Woodbridge defeated (Australia) Johan Anderson / (Australia) Richard Fromberg 6–3, 6–2

=== Girls' doubles ===
(Australia) Jo-Anne Faull / (Australia) Rachel McQuillan defeated (Australia) Kate McDonald / (Australia) Rennae Stubbs 6–1, 7–5

Preceded by 1987 US Open	Grand Slams	Succeeded by 1988 French Open
