= 1989 Australian Indoor Championships – Singles =

Singles
- 1989 Australian Indoor Championships

Final
- Champion: (Czechoslovakia) Ivan Lendl
- Runner-up: (Sweden) Lars-Anders Wahlgren
- Score: 6–2, 6–2, 6–1

Details
- Draw: 32
- Seeds: 8

Events
| Singles | Doubles |
| ← 1988 · | Australian Indoor Tennis Championships | · 1990 → |

Slobodan Živojinović was the defending champion but lost in the quarterfinals to Lars-Anders Wahlgren.

Ivan Lendl won in the final 6–2, 6–2, 6–1 against Wahlgren.

== Seeds ==
1. (Czechoslovakia) Ivan Lendl (champion)
2. (Switzerland) Jakob Hlasek (first round)
3. (West Germany) Carl-Uwe Steeb (second round)
4. (Australia) John Fitzgerald (first round)
5. (Socialist Federal Republic of Yugoslavia) Slobodan Živojinović (quarterfinals)
6. (West Germany) Eric Jelen (first round)
7. (United States) Richard Matuszewski (first round)
8. (Australia) Wally Masur (second round)

== Draw ==
=== Key ===
- Q = Qualifier
- WC = Wild card
- LL = Lucky loser
- Alt = Alternate
- SE = Special exempt
- PR = Protected ranking
- ITF = ITF entry
- JE = Junior exempt
- w/o = Walkover
- r = Retired
- d = Defaulted
- SR = Special ranking

=== Finals ===
Semifinals
1 | (Czechoslovakia) Ivan Lendl | 6 | 6
SE | (Sweden) Niclas Kroon | 1 | 1
Q | (Sweden) Lars-Anders Wahlgren | 6 | 4 | 6
(Australia) Johan Anderson | 3 | 6 | 4

Final
1 | (Czechoslovakia) Ivan Lendl | 6 | 6 | 6
Q | (Sweden) Lars-Anders Wahlgren | 2 | 2 | 1

=== Top half ===
First round
1 | (Czechoslovakia) I Lendl | 6 | 6
Q | (Brazil) M Menezes | 2 | 0
(United States) D Pate | 6 | 2 | 4
(United States) L Shiras | 2 | 6 | 6
(Sweden) T Högstedt | 7 | 6
(Argentina) H de la Peña | 5 | 2
(Australia) B Drewett | 4 | 4
8 | (Australia) W Masur | 6 | 6
4 | (Australia) J Fitzgerald | 3 | 6 | 4
SE | (Sweden) N Kroon | 6 | 2 | 6
(Australia) D Cahill | 6 | 6
WC | (India) V Amritraj | 4 | 0
(Australia) M Woodforde | 6 | 7
WC | (Australia) S Barr | 3 | 6
(Australia) R Fromberg | 4 | 7 | 6
6 | (West Germany) E Jelen | 6 | 6 | 2

Second round
1 | (Czechoslovakia) I Lendl | 6 | 6
(United States) L Shiras | 2 | 4
(Sweden) T Högstedt | 5 | 6 | 6
8 | (Australia) W Masur | 7 | 4 | 2
SE | (Sweden) N Kroon | 6 | 6
(Australia) D Cahill | 0 | 4
(Australia) M Woodforde | 1 | 6 | 6
(Australia) R Fromberg | 6 | 2 | 3

Quarterfinals
1 | (Czechoslovakia) I Lendl | 6 | 6
(Sweden) T Högstedt | 2 | 2
SE | (Sweden) N Kroon | 0 | 7 | 7
(Australia) M Woodforde | 6 | 5 | 6

Semifinals
1 | (Czechoslovakia) I Lendl | 6 | 6
SE | (Sweden) N Kroon | 1 | 1

=== Bottom half ===
First round
5 | (Socialist Federal Republic of Yugoslavia) S Živojinović | 5 | 6 | 6
Q | (Australia) D Patten | 7 | 2 | 4
(Canada) G Michibata | 1 | 6 | 5
Q | (West Germany) A Mronz | 6 | 2 | 7
Q | (Sweden) L-A Wahlgren | 7 | 3 | 6
(Canada) G Connell | 6 | 6 | 4
(Australia) T Woodbridge | 1 | 4
3 | (West Germany) C-U Steeb | 6 | 6
7 | (United States) R Matuszewski | 2 | 2
(Australia) J Anderson | 6 | 6
WC | (Australia) S Youl | 2 | 4
(West Germany) C Saceanu | 6 | 6
(France) J-P Fleurian | 4 | 6 | 4
(Australia) J Stoltenberg | 6 | 3 | 6
(Australia) M Kratzmann | 6 | 2 | 7
2 | (Switzerland) J Hlasek | 1 | 6 | 6

Second round
5 | (Socialist Federal Republic of Yugoslavia) S Živojinović | 4 | 6 | 6
Q | (West Germany) A Mronz | 6 | 1 | 4
Q | (Sweden) L-A Wahlgren | 1 | 6 | 6
3 | (West Germany) C-U Steeb | 6 | 4 | 4
(Australia) J Anderson | 6 | 6
(West Germany) C Saceanu | 1 | 3
(Australia) J Stoltenberg | 6 | 7 | 6
(Australia) M Kratzmann | 7 | 6 | 3

Quarterfinals
5 | (Socialist Federal Republic of Yugoslavia) S Živojinović | 3 | 6
Q | (Sweden) L-A Wahlgren | 6 | 7
(Australia) J Anderson | 6 | 6
(Australia) J Stoltenberg | 3 | 3

Semifinals
Q | (Sweden) L-A Wahlgren | 6 | 4 | 6
(Australia) J Anderson | 3 | 6 | 4
