= 1987 Swan Premium Open – Singles =

Singles
- 1987 Swan Premium Open

Final
- Champion: (Czechoslovakia) Ivan Lendl
- Runner-up: (Australia) Pat Cash
- Score: 6–4, 6–2, 6–4

Details
- Draw: 32
- Seeds: 8

Events
Singles	Doubles
← 1986 ·	Australian Indoor Tennis Championships	· 1988 →

Boris Becker was the defending champion but lost in the semifinals to Pat Cash.

Ivan Lendl won in the final 6–4, 6–2, 6–4 against Cash.

== Seeds ==
1. (Czechoslovakia) Ivan Lendl (champion)
2. (West Germany) Boris Becker (semifinals)
3. (Australia) Pat Cash (final)
4. (Socialist Federal Republic of Yugoslavia) Slobodan Živojinović (semifinals)
5. (United States) Scott Davis (quarterfinals)
6. (Australia) Wally Masur (first round)
7. (India) Ramesh Krishnan (quarterfinals)
8. (United States) Paul Annacone (quarterfinals)

== Draw ==
=== Key ===
- Q = Qualifier
- WC = Wild card
- LL = Lucky loser
- Alt = Alternate
- SE = Special exempt
- PR = Protected ranking
- ITF = ITF entry
- JE = Junior exempt
- w/o = Walkover
- r = Retired
- d = Defaulted
- SR = Special ranking

=== Finals ===
Semifinals
1	(Czechoslovakia) Ivan Lendl	6	7
4	(Socialist Federal Republic of Yugoslavia) Slobodan Živojinović	3	5
3	(Australia) Pat Cash	6	2	7
2	(West Germany) Boris Becker	3	6	6

Final
1	(Czechoslovakia) Ivan Lendl	6	6	6
3	(Australia) Pat Cash	4	2	4

=== Section 1 ===
First round
1	(Czechoslovakia) I Lendl	6	6
(Australia) P Doohan	2	4
(West Germany) E Jelen	6	5	6
WC	(Australia) J Stoltenberg	4	7	3
(Australia) B Drewett	1	4
(United States) R Seguso	6	6
(United States) M De Palmer	6	6
7	(India) R Krishnan	7	7
4	(Socialist Federal Republic of Yugoslavia) S Živojinović	4	6	6
(Nigeria) T Mmoh	6	3	1
Q	(West Germany) C Saceanu	6	6
(United States) M Anger	2	3
(Australia) S Youl	3	4
(United States) M Davis	6	6
Q	(Australia) S Barr	6	6
6	(Australia) W Masur	2	3

Second round
1	(Czechoslovakia) I Lendl	w/o
(West Germany) E Jelen
(United States) R Seguso	6	4
7	(India) R Krishnan	7	6
4	(Socialist Federal Republic of Yugoslavia) S Živojinović	6	6
Q	(West Germany) C Saceanu	3	4
(United States) M Davis	6	6
Q	(Australia) S Barr	4	3

Quarterfinals
1	(Czechoslovakia) I Lendl	6	6
7	(India) R Krishnan	2	3
4	(Socialist Federal Republic of Yugoslavia) S Živojinović	7	6
(United States) M Davis	5	4

Semifinals
1	(Czechoslovakia) I Lendl	6	7
4	(Socialist Federal Republic of Yugoslavia) S Živojinović	3	5

=== Section 2 ===
First round
5	(United States) S Davis	2	6	6
WC	(Australia) J Fitzgerald	6	4	4
(Australia) D Cahill	6	3	6
(Australia) B Dyke	4	6	3
Q	(Australia) M Kratzmann	2	5
WC	(Australia) J Frawley	6	7
(New Zealand) K Evernden	3	6
3	(Australia) P Cash	6	7
8	(United States) P Annacone	2	6	7
(Australia) P McNamee	6	1	5
(United States) J Canter	6	5
(South Africa) G Muller	7	7
(United States) S Giammalva Jr.	6	6
(United States) M Freeman	3	1
Q	(United States) T Pawsat	4	0
2	(West Germany) B Becker	6	6

Second round
5	(United States) S Davis	6	3	6
(Australia) D Cahill	3	6	2
WC	(Australia) J Frawley	3	6
3	(Australia) P Cash	6	7
8	(United States) P Annacone	7	7
(South Africa) G Muller	6	6
(United States) S Giammalva Jr.	2	4
2	(West Germany) B Becker	6	6

Quarterfinals
5	(United States) S Davis	3	5
3	(Australia) P Cash	6	7
8	(United States) P Annacone	3	2
2	(West Germany) B Becker	6	6

Semifinals
3	(Australia) P Cash	6	2	7
2	(West Germany) B Becker	3	6	6
