= 1988 Swan Premium Open – Doubles =

Doubles
- 1988 Swan Premium Open

Final
- Champions: (Australia) Darren Cahill (Australia) John Fitzgerald
- Runners-up: (United States) Martin Davis (Australia) Brad Drewett
- Score: 6–3, 6–2

Events
Singles	Doubles
← 1987 ·	Swan Premium Open	· 1989 →

Darren Cahill and Mark Kratzmann were the defending champions but they competed with different partners that year, Cahill with John Fitzgerald and Kratzmann with Broderick Dyke.

Dyke and Kratzmann lost in the first round to Peter Doohan and Laurie Warder.

Cahill and Fitzgerald won in the final 6–3, 6–2 against Martin Davis and Brad Drewett.

== Seeds ==
1. (Australia) Darren Cahill / (Australia) John Fitzgerald (champions)
2. (United States) Martin Davis / (Australia) Brad Drewett (final)
3. (Canada) Grant Connell / (Canada) Glenn Michibata (quarterfinals)
4. (Australia) Peter Doohan / (Australia) Laurie Warder (quarterfinals)

== Draw ==
=== Key ===
- Q = Qualifier
- WC = Wild card
- LL = Lucky loser
- Alt = Alternate
- SE = Special exempt
- PR = Protected ranking
- ITF = ITF entry
- JE = Junior exempt
- w/o = Walkover
- r = Retired
- d = Defaulted
- SR = Special ranking

First round
1	(Australia) D Cahill (Australia) J Fitzgerald	7	6
(United States) R Matuszewski (United States) T Nelson	6	2
(Australia) B Custer (Australia) D Macpherson	6	4	4
(Australia) J Stoltenberg (Australia) T Woodbridge	4	6	6
3	(Canada) G Connell (Canada) G Michibata	6	6
(Australia) P Carter (New Zealand) B Derlin	4	3
(West Germany) E Jelen (West Germany) C-U Steeb	6	6
(United States) T Siegel (Australia) D Tyson	4	0
(United States) J Rive (United States) L Shiras	7	6
(Australia) S Barr (Australia) J Frawley	6	4
(Australia) B Dyke (Australia) M Kratzmann	6	3
4	(Australia) P Doohan (Australia) L Warder	7	6
(Australia) J Anderson (Australia) R Fromberg	3	3
(Ecuador) A Gómez (Socialist Federal Republic of Yugoslavia) S Živojinović	6	6
(United States) M Anger (New Zealand) K Evernden	6	3	5
2	(United States) M Davis (Australia) B Drewett	2	6	7

Quarterfinals
1	(Australia) D Cahill (Australia) J Fitzgerald	6	6	6
(Australia) J Stoltenberg (Australia) T Woodbridge	4	7	4
3	(Canada) G Connell (Canada) G Michibata	2	3
(West Germany) E Jelen (West Germany) C-U Steeb	6	6
(United States) J Rive (United States) L Shiras	7	6	6
4	(Australia) P Doohan (Australia) L Warder	6	7	1
(Ecuador) A Gómez (Socialist Federal Republic of Yugoslavia) S Živojinović	6	4
2	(United States) M Davis (Australia) B Drewett	7	6

Semifinals
1	(Australia) D Cahill (Australia) J Fitzgerald	6	7
(West Germany) E Jelen (West Germany) C-U Steeb	2	5
(United States) J Rive (United States) L Shiras	7	6	2
2	(United States) M Davis (Australia) B Drewett	6	7	6

Final
1	(Australia) D Cahill (Australia) J Fitzgerald	6	6
2	(United States) M Davis (Australia) B Drewett	3	2
