= 1988 Swan Premium Open – Singles =

Singles
- 1988 Swan Premium Open

Final
- Champion: (Socialist Federal Republic of Yugoslavia) Slobodan Živojinović
- Runner-up: (United States) Richard Matuszewski
- Score: 7–6, 6–3, 6–4

Details
- Draw: 32
- Seeds: 8

Events
Singles	Doubles
← 1987 ·	Australian Indoor Tennis Championships	· 1989 →

Ivan Lendl was the defending champion but did not compete that year.

Slobodan Živojinović won in the final 7–6, 6–3, 6–4 against Richard Matuszewski.

== Seeds ==
1. (United States) Tim Mayotte (semifinals)
2. (Ecuador) Andrés Gómez (semifinals)
3. (Australia) Darren Cahill (second round)
4. (Australia) John Fitzgerald (second round)
5. (Socialist Federal Republic of Yugoslavia) Slobodan Živojinović (champion)
6. (Australia) John Frawley (first round)
7. (West Germany) Eric Jelen (second round)
8. (United States) Joey Rive (first round)

== Draw ==
=== Key ===
- Q = Qualifier
- WC = Wild card
- LL = Lucky loser
- Alt = Alternate
- SE = Special exempt
- PR = Protected ranking
- ITF = ITF entry
- JE = Junior exempt
- w/o = Walkover
- r = Retired
- d = Defaulted
- SR = Special ranking

=== Finals ===
Semifinals
1	(United States) Tim Mayotte	6	4
(United States) Richard Matuszewski	7	6
5	(Socialist Federal Republic of Yugoslavia) Slobodan Živojinović	6	6
2	(Ecuador) Andrés Gómez	4	2

Final
(United States) Richard Matuszewski	6	3	4
5	(Socialist Federal Republic of Yugoslavia) Slobodan Živojinović	7	6	6

=== Section 1 ===
First round
1	(United States) T Mayotte	6	6
(Australia) B Drewett	2	4
(Canada) C Pridham	4	7	5
(United States) T Nelson	6	6	7
(West Germany) C-U Steeb	6	6	6
(New Zealand) K Evernden	7	2	4
(United States) L Shiras	2	6	3
7	(West Germany) E Jelen	6	4	6
4	(Australia) J Fitzgerald	3	7	6
WC	(Australia) S Barr	6	6	4
(Australia) J Stoltenberg	3	5
(Canada) G Michibata	6	7
(Australia) P Doohan	0	1
(United States) R Matuszewski	6	6
(United States) M Davis	7	6
6	(Australia) J Frawley	6	4

Second round
1	(United States) T Mayotte	7	6
(United States) T Nelson	5	2
(West Germany) C-U Steeb	6	6
7	(West Germany) E Jelen	4	4
4	(Australia) J Fitzgerald	4	6
(Canada) G Michibata	6	7
(United States) R Matuszewski	6	6
(United States) M Davis	4	4

Quarterfinals
1	(United States) T Mayotte	3	7	6
(West Germany) C-U Steeb	6	5	3
(Canada) G Michibata	4	6	6
(United States) R Matuszewski	6	4	7

Semifinals
1	(United States) T Mayotte	6	4
(United States) R Matuszewski	7	6

=== Section 2 ===
First round
5	(Socialist Federal Republic of Yugoslavia) S Živojinović	6	6
Q	(Australia) C Turich	1	3
(Australia) B Dyke	6	6
(Australia) R Fromberg	4	2
(United States) M Anger	6	7	6
(Canada) G Connell	7	5	7
WC	(Australia) T Woodbridge	4	4
3	(Australia) D Cahill	6	6
8	(United States) J Rive	6	6	3
(Japan) S Matsuoka	4	7	6
(Australia) J Anderson	6	6	5
WC	(Australia) M Kratzmann	4	7	7
Q	(Australia) B Custer	6	7
Q	(Australia) B Roe	2	6
Q	(New Zealand) B Derlin	6	2	3
2	(Ecuador) A Gómez	1	6	6

Second round
5	(Socialist Federal Republic of Yugoslavia) S Živojinović	6	7
(Australia) B Dyke	3	6
(Canada) G Connell	3	7	6
3	(Australia) D Cahill	6	6	2
(Japan) S Matsuoka	6	7
WC	(Australia) M Kratzmann	1	6
Q	(Australia) B Custer	4	6
2	(Ecuador) A Gómez	6	7

Quarterfinals
5	(Socialist Federal Republic of Yugoslavia) S Živojinović	6	6
(Canada) G Connell	4	2
(Japan) S Matsuoka	6	7	2
2	(Ecuador) A Gómez	7	5	6

Semifinals
5	(Socialist Federal Republic of Yugoslavia) S Živojinović	6	6
2	(Ecuador) A Gómez	4	2
