= 1989 Australian Indoor Championships – Doubles =

Doubles
- 1989 Australian Indoor Championships

Final
- Champions: (United States) David Pate (United States) Scott Warner
- Runners-up: (Australia) Darren Cahill (Australia) Mark Kratzmann
- Score: 6–3, 6–7, 7–5

Events
Singles	Doubles
← 1988 ·	Australian Indoor Championships	· 1990 →

Darren Cahill and John Fitzgerald were the defending champions but they competed with different partners that year, Cahill with Mark Kratzmann and Fitzgerald with Simon Youl.

Fitzgerald and Youl lost in the first round to Peter Doohan and Laurie Warder.

Cahill and Kratzmann lost in the final 6–3, 6–7, 7–5 to David Pate and Scott Warner.

== Seeds ==
1. (Australia) Darren Cahill / (Australia) Mark Kratzmann (final)
2. (Australia) Peter Doohan / (Australia) Laurie Warder (quarterfinals)
3. (Australia) Brad Drewett / (Australia) Wally Masur (first round)
4. (West Germany) Eric Jelen / (West Germany) Carl-Uwe Steeb (first round)

== Draw ==
=== Key ===
- Q = Qualifier
- WC = Wild card
- LL = Lucky loser
- Alt = Alternate
- SE = Special exempt
- PR = Protected ranking
- ITF = ITF entry
- JE = Junior exempt
- w/o = Walkover
- r = Retired
- d = Defaulted
- SR = Special ranking

First round
1	(Australia) D Cahill (Australia) M Kratzmann	6	6
(India) Z Ali (United States) J Letts	2	2
(Switzerland) J Hlasek (Czechoslovakia) I Lendl	6	3
(Australia) J Stoltenberg (Australia) T Woodbridge	7	6
3	(Australia) B Drewett (Australia) W Masur	3	6
(France) J-P Fleurian (West Germany) C Saceanu	6	7
(Brazil) N Aerts (Brazil) M Menezes	6	2	6
(Sweden) N Kroon (Sweden) L-A Wahlgren	4	6	3
(Canada) G Connell (Canada) G Michibata	6	6
(United States) R Matuszewski (West Germany) A Mronz	3	4
(Australia) B Dyke (United States) L Shiras	2	6	6
4	(West Germany) E Jelen (West Germany) C-U Steeb	6	3	3
(Australia) B Custer (Socialist Federal Republic of Yugoslavia) S Živojinović	5	2
(United States) D Pate (United States) S Warner	7	6
(Australia) J Fitzgerald (Australia) S Youl	2	5
2	(Australia) P Doohan (Australia) L Warder	6	7

Quarterfinals
1	(Australia) D Cahill (Australia) M Kratzmann	4	7	6
(Australia) J Stoltenberg (Australia) T Woodbridge	6	6	4
(France) J-P Fleurian (West Germany) C Saceanu	6	6
(Brazil) N Aerts (Brazil) M Menezes	2	4
(Canada) G Connell (Canada) G Michibata	6	6
(Australia) B Dyke (United States) L Shiras	3	3
(United States) D Pate (United States) S Warner	6	7
2	(Australia) P Doohan (Australia) L Warder	4	6

Semifinals
1	(Australia) D Cahill (Australia) M Kratzmann	7	5	6
(France) J-P Fleurian (West Germany) C Saceanu	5	7	3
(Canada) G Connell (Canada) G Michibata	4	7	3
(United States) D Pate (United States) S Warner	6	6	6

Final
1	(Australia) D Cahill (Australia) M Kratzmann	3	7	5
(United States) D Pate (United States) S Warner	6	6	7
