= 1987 Swan Premium Open – Doubles =

Doubles
- 1987 Swan Premium Open

Final
- Champions: (Australia) Darren Cahill (Australia) Mark Kratzmann
- Runners-up: (West Germany) Boris Becker (United States) Robert Seguso
- Score: 6–3, 6–2

Events
Singles	Doubles
← 1986 ·	Swan Premium Open	· 1988 →

Boris Becker and John Fitzgerald were the defending champions but they competed with different partners that year, Becker with Robert Seguso and Fitzgerald with Eric Jelen.

Fitzgerald and Jelen lost in the first round to Matt Anger and Kelly Evernden.

Becker and Seguso lost in the final 6–3, 6–2 to Darren Cahill and Mark Kratzmann.

== Seeds ==
1. (West Germany) Boris Becker / (United States) Robert Seguso (final)
2. (United States) Paul Annacone / (Socialist Federal Republic of Yugoslavia) Slobodan Živojinović (quarterfinals)
3. (United States) Scott Davis / (United States) Mike De Palmer (quarterfinals)
4. (Australia) Peter Doohan / (United States) Sammy Giammalva Jr. (quarterfinals)

== Draw ==
=== Key ===
- Q = Qualifier
- WC = Wild card
- LL = Lucky loser
- Alt = Alternate
- SE = Special exempt
- PR = Protected ranking
- ITF = ITF entry
- JE = Junior exempt
- w/o = Walkover
- r = Retired
- d = Defaulted
- SR = Special ranking

First round
1	(West Germany) B Becker (United States) R Seguso	6	6	6
(United States) M Freeman (United States) C Hooper	7	4	2
(United States) T Siegel (Australia) D Tyson	1	6	3
(Australia) D Macpherson (Australia) S Youl	6	4	6
3	(United States) S Davis (United States) M De Palmer	3	7	6
(Australia) J Frawley (Australia) P McNamee	6	6	4
(Australia) J Fitzgerald (West Germany) E Jelen
(United States) M Anger (New Zealand) K Evernden	w/o
(Nigeria) T Mmoh (West Germany) C Saceanu	4	2
(Australia) D Cahill (Australia) M Kratzmann	6	6
(South Africa) G Muller (United States) T Pawsat	4	6	2
4	(Australia) P Doohan (United States) S Giammalva Jr.	6	3	6
(Australia) B Dyke (Australia) W Masur	4	6
(United States) M Davis (Australia) B Drewett	6	7
(Australia) P Carter (United States) L Shiras	6	7	2
2	(United States) P Annacone (Socialist Federal Republic of Yugoslavia) S Živojinović	7	6	6

Quarterfinals
1	(West Germany) B Becker (United States) R Seguso	6	7
(Australia) D Macpherson (Australia) S Youl	4	5
3	(United States) S Davis (United States) M De Palmer	3	6
(United States) M Anger (New Zealand) K Evernden	6	7
(Australia) D Cahill (Australia) M Kratzmann	7	4	7
4	(Australia) P Doohan (United States) S Giammalva Jr.	6	6	6
(United States) M Davis (Australia) B Drewett	7	6
2	(United States) P Annacone (Socialist Federal Republic of Yugoslavia) S Živojinović	6	4

Semifinals
1	(West Germany) B Becker (United States) R Seguso	6	7
(United States) M Anger (New Zealand) K Evernden	3	6
(Australia) D Cahill (Australia) M Kratzmann	6	4	6
(United States) M Davis (Australia) B Drewett	4	6	3

Final
1	(West Germany) B Becker (United States) R Seguso	3	2
(Australia) D Cahill (Australia) M Kratzmann	6	6
