= 1990 Australian Open – Men's doubles =

Tennis tournament

Men's doubles
- 1990 Australian Open

Final
- Champions: (South Africa) Pieter Aldrich (South Africa) Danie Visser
- Runners-up: (Canada) Grant Connell (Canada) Glenn Michibata
- Score: 6–4, 4–6, 6–1, 6–4

Details
- Draw: 64
- Seeds: 16

Events
Singles	men	women		boys	girls
Doubles	men	women	mixed	boys	girls
WC Singles	men	women	quad
WC Doubles	men	women	quad
Legends	men	women	mixed
- Australian Open

Rick Leach and Jim Pugh were the defending champions, but lost in the semifinals to Grant Connell and Glenn Michibata.
Pieter Aldrich and Danie Visser won the title, defeating Connell and Michibata 6–4, 4–6, 6–1, 6–4, in the final.

== Seeds ==
1. (United States) Rick Leach / (United States) Jim Pugh (semifinals)
2. (South Africa) Pieter Aldrich / (South Africa) Danie Visser (champions)
3. (United States) Paul Annacone / (Australia) John Fitzgerald (third round)
4. (South Africa) Christo van Rensburg / (Australia) Mark Woodforde (second round)
5. (Switzerland) Jakob Hlasek / (France) Éric Winogradsky (third round)
6. (Australia) Darren Cahill / (Australia) Mark Kratzmann (quarterfinals)
7. (United States) Tim Pawsat / (Australia) Laurie Warder (first round)
8. (United States) Jim Courier / (United States) Pete Sampras (first round)
9. (New Zealand) Kelly Evernden / (Spain) Javier Sánchez (second round)
10. (Spain) Tomás Carbonell / (Italy) Diego Nargiso (first round)
11. (Spain) Sergio Casal / (Spain) Emilio Sánchez (second round)
12. (Mexico) Jorge Lozano / (United States) Todd Witsken (second round)
13. (Canada) Grant Connell / (Canada) Glenn Michibata (final)
14. (Australia) Peter Doohan / (Hungary) Balázs Taróczy (first round)
15. (Socialist Federal Republic of Yugoslavia) Goran Ivanišević / (Socialist Federal Republic of Yugoslavia) Slobodan Živojinović (second round)
16. (United States) Glenn Layendecker / (United States) Richey Reneberg (third round)

== Draw ==
Key

- Q = Qualifier
- WC = Wild card
- LL = Lucky loser
- Alt = Alternate
- ITF = ITF entry
- PR = Protected ranking
- SR = Special ranking
- SE = Special exempt
- JE = Junior exempt
- JR = Junior Accelerator Programme entrant
- CO = College Accelerator Programme entrant
- NG = Next Gen Accelerator Program entrant
- w/o = Walkover
- r = Retired
- d = Defaulted

=== Finals ===
Quarterfinals
1	(United States) Rick Leach (United States) Jim Pugh	3	7	7	3	6
WC	(Australia) Pat Cash (Sweden) Stefan Edberg	6	5	6	6	4
13	(Canada) Grant Connell (Canada) Glenn Michibata	4	7	7	6
WC	(France) Jean-Philippe Fleurian (France) Henri Leconte	6	5	5	2
6	(Australia) Darren Cahill (Australia) Mark Kratzmann	4	6	3	6
(South Africa) Neil Broad (South Africa) Gary Muller	6	3	6	7
(United States) Scott Davis (United States) Robert Van't Hof	6	4	6	6	21
2	(South Africa) Pieter Aldrich (South Africa) Danie Visser	4	6	7	4	23

Semifinals
1	(United States) Rick Leach (United States) Jim Pugh	6	3	1	6	4
13	(Canada) Grant Connell (Canada) Glenn Michibata	3	6	6	2	6
(South Africa) Neil Broad (South Africa) Gary Muller	6	6	5
2	(South Africa) Pieter Aldrich (South Africa) Danie Visser	7	7	7

Final
13	(Canada) Grant Connell (Canada) Glenn Michibata	4	6	1	4
2	(South Africa) Pieter Aldrich (South Africa) Danie Visser	6	4	6	6

=== Top half ===
==== Section 1 ====
First round
1	(United States) R Leach (United States) J Pugh	6	6
(United States) B Page (United States) R Schmidt	4	2
(Australia) B Dyke (United States) S Warner	4	6	4
(United Kingdom) N Brown (Switzerland) H Günthardt	6	2	6
(United States) T Nelson (The Bahamas) R Smith	1	2
(United States) K Jones (United States) J Rive	6	6
(Israel) A Mansdorf (Socialist Federal Republic of Yugoslavia) G Prpić	7	6	2
16	(United States) G Layendecker (United States) R Reneberg	6	7	6
9	(New Zealand) K Evernden (Spain) J Sánchez	7	4	6
(United Kingdom) J Bates (Netherlands) T Nijssen	6	6	4
(Australia) T Woodbridge (Australia) S Youl	6	6
(New Zealand) B Derlin (New Zealand) S Guy	4	3
(Sweden) V Jansson (United States) K Kinnear	2	2
(Czechoslovakia) P Korda (Czechoslovakia) C Suk	6	6
WC	(Australia) P Cash (Sweden) S Edberg	7	6
7	(United States) T Pawsat (Australia) L Warder	6	2

Second round
1	(United States) R Leach (United States) J Pugh	6	6
(United Kingdom) N Brown (Switzerland) H Günthardt	4	2
(United States) K Jones (United States) J Rive	7	4	8
16	(United States) G Layendecker (United States) R Reneberg	5	6	10
9	(New Zealand) K Evernden (Spain) J Sánchez	4	4
(Australia) T Woodbridge (Australia) S Youl	6	6
(Czechoslovakia) P Korda (Czechoslovakia) C Suk	6	6	4
WC	(Australia) P Cash (Sweden) S Edberg	7	3	6

Third round
1	(United States) R Leach (United States) J Pugh	6	6
16	(United States) G Layendecker (United States) R Reneberg	4	4
(Australia) T Woodbridge (Australia) S Youl
WC	(Australia) P Cash (Sweden) S Edberg	w/o

Quarterfinals
1	(United States) R Leach (United States) J Pugh	3	7	7	3	6
WC	(Australia) P Cash (Sweden) S Edberg	6	5	6	6	4

==== Section 2 ====
First round
3	(United States) P Annacone (Australia) J Fitzgerald	6	6
WC	(Australia) J Morgan (Australia) D Patten	2	3
(West Germany) P Kühnen (Mexico) L Lavalle	6	6	8
(Australia) D Macpherson (United States) L Shiras	3	7	6
(Czechoslovakia) K Nováček (West Germany) R Osterthun	3	6	9
(Australia) B Custer (Australia) D Tyson	6	3	7
(United States) C Beckman (United States) S Cannon	6	4	4
13	(Canada) G Connell (Canada) G Michibata	3	6	6
11	(Spain) S Casal (Spain) E Sánchez	6	6
(Venezuela) A Mora (United States) J Schor	1	2
WC	(France) J-P Fleurian (France) H Leconte	2	6	7
(West Germany) P Baur (West Germany) C Saceanu	6	2	5
(France) G Forget (France) Y Noah	6	7
(Israel) G Bloom (United States) D Goldie	3	6
(France) T Benhabiles (France) C Pioline	2	6	17
5	(Switzerland) J Hlasek (France) É Winogradsky	6	4	19

Second round
3	(United States) P Annacone (Australia) J Fitzgerald	6	7
(West Germany) P Kühnen (Mexico) L Lavalle	3	6
(Czechoslovakia) K Nováček (West Germany) R Osterthun	2	1
13	(Canada) G Connell (Canada) G Michibata	6	6
11	(Spain) S Casal (Spain) E Sánchez	3	6	5
WC	(France) J-P Fleurian (France) H Leconte	6	4	7
(France) G Forget (France) Y Noah
5	(Switzerland) J Hlasek (France) É Winogradsky	w/o

Third round
3	(United States) P Annacone (Australia) J Fitzgerald	4	6	4
13	(Canada) G Connell (Canada) G Michibata	6	4	6
WC	(France) J-P Fleurian (France) H Leconte	6	7
5	(Switzerland) J Hlasek (France) É Winogradsky	2	6

Quarterfinals
13	(Canada) G Connell (Canada) G Michibata	4	7	7	6
WC	(France) J-P Fleurian (France) H Leconte	6	5	5	2

=== Bottom half ===
==== Section 3 ====
First round
6	(Australia) D Cahill (Australia) M Kratzmann	4	7	10
(West Germany) P Ballauff (Sweden) L-A Wahlgren	6	5	8
(United States) L Jensen (United States) D Wheaton	6	7
(West Germany) U Riglewski (West Germany) M Stich	3	5
(Australia) B Drewett (Australia) W Masur	6	4	14
(West Germany) A Mronz (Netherlands) M Schapers	4	6	12
(United States) P Galbraith (United States) G Van Emburgh	6	1	5
12	(Mexico) J Lozano (United States) T Witsken	3	6	7
14	(Australia) P Doohan (Hungary) B Taróczy	2	5
(Netherlands) P Haarhuis (Netherlands) M Koevermans	6	7
(Sweden) P Henricsson (Sweden) N Utgren	6	6
(United Kingdom) A Castle (Nigeria) N Odizor	3	4
(South Africa) N Broad (South Africa) G Muller	6	7
(Sweden) R Båthman (Sweden) P Svensson	3	6
(Austria) A Antonitsch (Austria) T Muster	4	7	7
4	(South Africa) C van Rensburg (Australia) M Woodforde	6	6	9

Second round
6	(Australia) D Cahill (Australia) M Kratzmann	6	6
(United States) L Jensen (United States) D Wheaton	3	3
(Australia) B Drewett (Australia) W Masur	6	6
12	(Mexico) J Lozano (United States) T Witsken	3	3
(Netherlands) P Haarhuis (Netherlands) M Koevermans	6	6
(Sweden) P Henricsson (Sweden) N Utgren	7	7
(South Africa) N Broad (South Africa) G Muller	6	7
4	(South Africa) C van Rensburg (Australia) M Woodforde	4	6

Third round
6	(Australia) D Cahill (Australia) M Kratzmann	6	6
(Australia) B Drewett (Australia) W Masur	3	4
(Sweden) P Henricsson (Sweden) N Utgren	4	6	3
(South Africa) N Broad (South Africa) G Muller	6	4	6

Quarterfinals
6	(Australia) D Cahill (Australia) M Kratzmann	4	6	3	6
(South Africa) N Broad (South Africa) G Muller	6	3	6	7

==== Section 4 ====
First round
8	(United States) J Courier (United States) P Sampras	4	4
(United States) D Cassidy (Italy) G Pozzi	6	6
(Spain) J Arrese (Spain) F Clavet	2	7	4
(Spain) JF Altur (South Africa) D Adams	6	5	6
(Ecuador) A Gómez (Venezuela) N Pereira	4	2
WC	(Australia) S Barr (Australia) N Borwick	6	6
(United States) S Davis (United States) R Van't Hof	6	6
10	(Spain) T Carbonell (Italy) D Nargiso	4	4
15	(Socialist Federal Republic of Yugoslavia) G Ivanišević (Socialist Federal Republic of Yugoslavia) S Živojinović	6	6
(Sweden) D Engel (Sweden) M Gustafsson	3	4
(United States) P Chamberlin (United States) T Wilkison	4	6	6
(Sweden) N Kroon (Sweden) M Larsson	6	4	3
(France) O Delaître (Canada) M Laurendeau	6	6
WC	(Australia) J Anderson (Australia) R Fromberg	4	4
(Spain) F Roig (United States) T Scherman	3	4
2	(South Africa) P Aldrich (South Africa) D Visser	6	6

Second round
(United States) D Cassidy (Italy) G Pozzi	6	6
(Spain) JF Altur (South Africa) D Adams	3	4
WC	(Australia) S Barr (Australia) N Borwick	1	4
(United States) S Davis (United States) R Van't Hof	6	6
15	(Socialist Federal Republic of Yugoslavia) G Ivanišević (Socialist Federal Republic of Yugoslavia) S Živojinović	5	6	4
(United States) P Chamberlin (United States) T Wilkison	7	3	6
(France) O Delaître (Canada) M Laurendeau	5	3
2	(South Africa) P Aldrich (South Africa) D Visser	7	6

Third round
(United States) D Cassidy (Italy) G Pozzi	5	6	2
(United States) S Davis (United States) R Van't Hof	7	3	6
(United States) P Chamberlin (United States) T Wilkison	3	4
2	(South Africa) P Aldrich (South Africa) D Visser	6	6

Quarterfinals
(United States) S Davis (United States) R Van't Hof	6	4	6	6	21
2	(South Africa) P Aldrich (South Africa) D Visser	4	6	7	4	23
