= 1990 Australian Open – Mixed doubles =

Mixed doubles
- 1990 Australian Open

Final
- Champions: (Soviet Union) Natasha Zvereva (United States) Jim Pugh
- Runners-up: (United States) Zina Garrison (United States) Rick Leach
- Score: 4–6, 6–2, 6–3

Details
- Draw: 32
- Seeds: 8

Events
Singles	men	women		boys	girls
Doubles	men	women	mixed	boys	girls
WC Singles	men	women	quad
WC Doubles	men	women	quad
Legends	men	women	mixed
- Australian Open

Jana Novotná and Jim Pugh were the defending champions but only Pugh competed that year with Natasha Zvereva.

Zvereva and Pugh won in the final 4–6, 6–2, 6–3 against Zina Garrison and Rick Leach.

== Seeds ==
Champion seeds are indicated in bold text while text in italics indicates the round in which those seeds were eliminated.

1. (Soviet Union) **Natasha Zvereva** / (United States) **Jim Pugh (champions)**
2. (United States) Zina Garrison / (United States) Rick Leach (final)
3. (Australia) Elizabeth Smylie / (Australia) John Fitzgerald (semifinals)
4. (Australia) Wendy Turnbull / (Australia) Darren Cahill (first round)
5. (United States) Lori McNeil / (United States) Tim Pawsat (first round)
6. (United States) Patty Fendick / (United States) Scott Davis (first round)
7. (Australia) Janine Thompson / (Australia) Mark Kratzmann (second round)
8. (Canada) Jill Hetherington / (Australia) Peter Doohan (second round)

== Draw ==
Key

- Q = Qualifier
- WC = Wild card
- LL = Lucky loser
- Alt = Alternate
- ITF = ITF entry
- PR = Protected ranking
- SR = Special ranking
- SE = Special exempt
- JE = Junior exempt
- JR = Junior Accelerator Programme entrant
- CO = College Accelerator Programme entrant
- NG = Next Gen Accelerator Program entrant
- w/o = Walkover
- r = Retired
- d = Defaulted

=== Final ===
Final
1	(Soviet Union) **Natasha Zvereva** (United States) **Jim Pugh**	4	**6**	**6**
2	(United States) Zina Garrison (United States) Rick Leach	**6**	2	3

=== Top half ===
First round
1	(Soviet Union) **N Zvereva** (United States) **J Pugh**	**6**	**6**
WC	(Australia) K McDonald (Australia) N Borwick	2	2
(South Africa) D van Rensburg (United Kingdom) N Brown	3	**6**	1
(United States) **K Adams** (The Bahamas) **R Smith**	**6**	3	**6**
(United States) **R White** (United States) **S Cannon**	**6**	2	**6**
(United States) J Smoller (United States) G Van Emburgh	4	**6**	4
(United States) R Fairbank-Nideffer (South Africa) N Broad	**6**	4	3
7	(Australia) **J Thompson** (Australia) **M Kratzmann**	1	**6**	**6**
4	(Australia) W Turnbull (Australia) D Cahill	1	4
(United States) **M J Fernandez** (United States) **D Wheaton**	**6**	**6**
(Czechoslovakia) R Rajchrtová (Czechoslovakia) C Suk	3	2
(United Kingdom) **J Durie** (Australia) **L Warder**	**6**	**6**
(Sweden) M Lindström (Nigeria) N Odizor	4	2
WC	(Australia) **J-A Faull** (Australia) **T Woodbridge**	**6**	**6**
(United States) **G Fernández** (Mexico) **J Lozano**	**7^{7}**	**6**
6	(United States) P Fendick (United States) S Davis	6^{1}	4

Second round
1	(Soviet Union) **N Zvereva** (United States) **J Pugh**	**6**	**6**
(United States) K Adams (The Bahamas) R Smith	2	2
(United States) **R White** (United States) **S Cannon**	**6**	**7^{7}**
7	(Australia) J Thompson (Australia) M Kratzmann	1	6^{4}
(United States) M J Fernandez (United States) D Wheaton	3	6^{2}
(United Kingdom) **J Durie** (Australia) **L Warder**	**6**	**7^{7}**
WC	(Australia) J-A Faull (Australia) T Woodbridge	6^{5}	3
(United States) **G Fernández** (Mexico) **J Lozano**	**7^{7}**	**6**

Quarterfinals
1	(Soviet Union) **N Zvereva** (United States) **J Pugh**	**7**	4	**6**
(United States) R White (United States) S Cannon	5	**6**	2
(United Kingdom) **J Durie** (Australia) **L Warder**	**6**	**6**
(United States) G Fernández (Mexico) J Lozano	4	2

Semifinals
1	(Soviet Union) **N Zvereva** (United States) **J Pugh**	3	**6**	**6**
(United Kingdom) J Durie (Australia) L Warder	**6**	2	3

=== Bottom half ===
First round
8	(Canada) **J Hetherington** (Australia) **P Doohan**	**6**	6^{7}	**6**
(United States) S Stafford (South Africa) C van Rensburg	3	**7^{9}**	4
(United States) L Allen (United States) T Nelson	3	**7^{7}**	2
(Australia) **N Provis** (United Kingdom) **J Bates**	**6**	6^{5}	**6**
(United States) **C Benjamin** (United States) **T Witsken**	**6**	**7^{7}**
(United States) R Reis (United States) S Warner	2	6^{3}
(Hungary) A Temesvári (Socialist Federal Republic of Yugoslavia) S Živojinović	6^{3}	6^{1}
3	(Australia) **E Smylie** (Australia) **J Fitzgerald**	**7^{7}**	**7^{7}**
5	(United States) L McNeil (United States) T Pawsat	1	2
(West Germany) **C Porwik** (West Germany) **M Stich**	**6**	**6**
(Italy) **R Reggi** (United Kingdom) **A Castle**	**6**	**6**
(United States) T Phelps (United States) L Jensen	2	4
(United States) E Burgin (United States) G Layendecker	3	4
(Austria) **B Paulus** (Austria) **A Antonitsch**	**6**	**6**
(United States) H Ludloff (United States) C Beckman	**7^{9}**	1	2
2	(United States) **Z Garrison** (United States) **R Leach**	6^{7}	**6**	**6**

Second round
8	(Canada) J Hetherington (Australia) P Doohan	4	6^{4}
(Australia) **N Provis** (United Kingdom) **J Bates**	**6**	**7^{7}**
(United States) C Benjamin (United States) T Witsken
3	(Australia) **E Smylie** (Australia) **J Fitzgerald**	w/o
(West Germany) C Porwik (Germany) M Stich
(Italy) **R Reggi** (United Kingdom) **A Castle**	w/o
(Austria) B Paulus (Austria) A Antonitsch
2	(United States) **Z Garrison** (United States) **R Leach**	w/o

Quarterfinals
(Australia) N Provis (United Kingdom) J Bates	2	2
3	(Australia) **E Smylie** (Australia) **J Fitzgerald**	**6**	**6**
(Italy) R Reggi (United Kingdom) A Castle	4	4
2	(United States) **Z Garrison** (United States) **R Leach**	**6**	**6**

Semifinals
3	(Australia) E Smylie (Australia) J Fitzgerald	1	3
2	(United States) **Z Garrison** (United States) **R Leach**	**6**	**6**
