= 1989 Australian Indoor Championships =

Tennis tournament

- Date: 9–15 October
- Edition: 17th
- Category: Grand Prix
- Draw: 32S / 16D
- Prize money: $375,000
- Surface: Hard / indoor
- Location: Sydney, Australia
- Venue: Sydney Entertainment Centre

Champions

Singles
- (Czechoslovakia) Ivan Lendl

Doubles
- (United States) David Pate / (United States) Scott Warner
← 1988 ·	Australian Indoor Championships	· 1990 →

The 1989 Australian Indoor Championships was a men's tennis tournament played on indoor hard courts at the Sydney Entertainment Centre in Sydney, Australia and was part of the 1989 Nabisco Grand Prix. It was the 16th edition of the tournament and was held from 9 October through 15 October 1989. First-seeded Ivan Lendl won the singles title, his third at the event after 1985 and 1987.

== Finals ==
=== Singles ===
(Czechoslovakia) Ivan Lendl defeated (Sweden) Lars-Anders Wahlgren 6–2, 6–2, 6–1

- It was Lendl's 9th singles title of the year and the 82nd of his career.

=== Doubles ===
(United States) David Pate / (United States) Scott Warner defeated (Australia) Darren Cahill / (Australia) Mark Kratzmann 6–3, 6–7, 7–5

- It was Pate's 2nd title of the year and the 11th of his career. It was Warner's only title of the year and the 1st of his career.
