= 1988 Swan Premium Open =

- Date: 10–16 October
- Edition: 16th
- Category: Grand Prix
- Draw: 32S / 16D
- Prize money: $372,500
- Location: Sydney, Australia
- Venue: Sydney Entertainment Centre

Champions

Singles
- (Socialist Federal Republic of Yugoslavia) Slobodan Živojinović

Doubles
- (Australia) Darren Cahill / (Australia) John Fitzgerald
← 1987 ·	Australian Indoor Tennis Championships	· 1989 →

The 1988 Swan Premium Open was a tennis tournament played on indoor hard courts at the Sydney Entertainment Centre in Sydney, Australia and was part of the 1988 Nabisco Grand Prix. It was the 16th edition of the tournament and ran from 10 through 16 October 1988. Fifth-seeded Slobodan Živojinović won the singles title.

== Finals ==
=== Singles ===
(Socialist Federal Republic of Yugoslavia) Slobodan Živojinović defeated (United States) Richard Matuszewski 7–6, 6–3, 6–4

- It was Živojinović's only singles title of the year and the 2nd and last of his career.

=== Doubles ===
(Australia) Darren Cahill / (Australia) John Fitzgerald defeated (United States) Martin Davis / (Australia) Brad Drewett 6–3, 6–2

- It was Cahill's 4th title of the year and the 7th of his career. It was Fitzgerald's 4th title of the year and the 21st of his career.
