= 1987 Swan Premium Open =

- Date: 12–18 October
- Edition: 15th
- Draw: 32S / 16D
- Prize money: $275,000
- Surface: Hard / indoor
- Location: Sydney, Australia
- Venue: Sydney Entertainment Centre

Champions

Singles
- (Czechoslovakia) Ivan Lendl

Doubles
- (Australia) Darren Cahill / (Australia) Mark Kratzmann
| ← 1986 · | Australian Indoor Tennis Championships | · 1988 → |

The 1987 Swan Premium Open was a men's tennis tournament played on indoor hard courts at the Sydney Entertainment Centre in Sydney in Australia and was part of the 1987 Nabisco Grand Prix. It was the 15th edition of the tournament and was held from 12 October through 18 October 1987. First-seeded Ivan Lendl won the singles title, his second after 1985.

== Finals ==
=== Singles ===
(Czechoslovakia) Ivan Lendl defeated (Australia) Pat Cash 6–4, 6–2, 6–4

- It was Lendl's 7th title of the year and the 74th of his career.

=== Doubles ===
(Australia) Darren Cahill / (Australia) Mark Kratzmann defeated (West Germany) Boris Becker / (United States) Robert Seguso 6–3, 6–2

- It was Cahill's only title of the year and the 2nd of his career. It was Kratzmann's 1st title of the year and the 2nd of his career.
