= Darren Patten =

Australian tennis player

- Full name: Darren Patten
- Country (sports): Australia
- Born: 10 August 1970 (age 54); Geraldton, Western Australia
- Height: 188 cm (6 ft 2 in)

Singles
- Career record: 0–2
- Highest ranking: No. 380 (20 August 1990)

Grand Slam singles results
- Australian Open: 1R (1990)

Doubles
- Career record: 0–1
- Highest ranking: No. 478 (20 August 1990)

Grand Slam doubles results
- Australian Open: 1R (1990)

Darren Patten (born 10 August 1970) is a former professional tennis player from Australia.

== Biography ==
Originally from the Western Australian city of Geraldton, Patten attended Christ Church Grammar School in Perth, graduating in 1987.

Patten made his only main draw on the ATP Tour, then Grand Prix circuit, as a qualifier at the 1989 Australian Indoor Championships, pushing fifth seed Slobodan Živojinović to three sets in a first-round loss which went for an hour and 50 minutes.

At the 1990 Australian Open he was given a wildcard into the main draw, where he was beaten in the opening round by American Dan Goldie. He also competed in the men's doubles competition with Jamie Morgan.

Darren teamed with brother Brett Patten to win the ITF Australian O/45 Doubles title at the 2020 ITF Australian Championships held in Busselton, Western Australia.

He is now the CEO of the non-profit Murlpirrmarra Connection Limited.
