= 1992 US Open – Men's doubles =

Men's doubles
- 1992 US Open

Final
- Champion: (United States) Jim Grabb (United States) Richey Reneberg
- Runner-up: (United States) Kelly Jones (United States) Rick Leach
- Score: 3–6, 7–6^{(7–2)}, 6–3, 6–3

Details
- Draw: 64
- Seeds: 16

Events
| Singles | men | women | | boys | girls |
| Doubles | men | women | mixed | boys | girls |
| WC Singles | men | women | quad |
| WC Doubles | men | women | quad |
| Legends | men | women | mixed |
| ← 1991 · | US Open | · 1993 → |

The men's doubles tournament at the 1992 US Open was held between August 31 and September 13, 1992, on the outdoor hard courts at the USTA National Tennis Center in New York City, United States. Jim Grabb and Richey Reneberg won the title, defeating Kelly Jones and Rick Leach in the final.

== Seeds ==
1. (Australia) Mark Woodforde / (Australia) Todd Woodbridge (semifinals)
2. (United States) Jim Grabb / (United States) Richey Reneberg (champions)
3. (Australia) John Fitzgerald / (Sweden) Anders Järryd (third round)
4. (United States) Kelly Jones / (United States) Rick Leach (final)
5. (Switzerland) Jakob Hlasek / (Switzerland) Marc Rosset (second round)
6. (United States) John McEnroe / (Germany) Michael Stich (semifinals)
7. (Netherlands) Tom Nijssen / (Czechoslovakia) Cyril Suk (third round)
8. (United States) Steve DeVries / (Australia) David Macpherson (second round)
9. (United States) Patrick Galbraith / (South Africa) Danie Visser (third round)
10. (United States) Luke Jensen / (Australia) Laurie Warder (first round)
11. (Australia) Mark Kratzmann / (Australia) Wally Masur (second round)
12. (United States) Scott Davis / (United States) David Pate (third round)
13. (Spain) Sergio Casal / (Spain) Emilio Sánchez (quarterfinals)
14. (United States) Ken Flach / (United States) Todd Witsken (second round)
15. (Canada) Grant Connell / (Canada) Glenn Michibata (third round)
16. (South Africa) David Adams / (Commonwealth of Independent States) Andrei Olhovskiy (first round)

== Draw ==
=== Key ===
- Q = Qualifier
- WC = Wild card
- LL = Lucky loser
- Alt = Alternate
- ITF = ITF entry
- PR = Protected ranking
- SR = Special ranking
- SE = Special exempt
- JE = Junior exempt
- JR = Junior Accelerator Programme entrant
- CO = College Accelerator Programme entrant
- NG = Next Gen Accelerator Program entrant
- w/o = Walkover
- r = Retired
- d = Defaulted

=== Finals ===
Quarterfinals
1 | (Australia) Mark Woodforde (Australia) Todd Woodbridge | 6 | 3 | 6 | 6
(Netherlands) Jacco Eltingh (Netherlands) Paul Haarhuis | 3 | 6 | 3 | 4
4 | (United States) Kelly Jones (United States) Rick Leach | 6 | 7 | 6
(New Zealand) Kelly Evernden (United States) Glenn Layendecker | 3 | 6 | 2
6 | (United States) John McEnroe (Germany) Michael Stich | 6 | 6 | 6 | 6
13 | (Spain) Sergio Casal (Spain) Emilio Sánchez | 7 | 3 | 7 | 4
(Australia) Neil Borwick (Australia) Simon Youl | 4 | 6 | 3
2 | (United States) Jim Grabb (United States) Richey Reneberg | 6 | 7 | 6

Semifinals
1 | (Australia) Mark Woodforde (Australia) Todd Woodbridge | 6 | 6 | 2
4 | (United States) Kelly Jones (United States) Rick Leach | 7 | 7 | 6
6 | (United States) John McEnroe (Germany) Michael Stich | 6 | 5 | 6 | 6 | 2
2 | (United States) Jim Grabb (United States) Richey Reneberg | 3 | 7 | 7 | 4 | 6

Final
4 | (United States) Kelly Jones (United States) Rick Leach | 6 | 6^{2} | 3 | 3
2 | (United States) Jim Grabb (United States) Richey Reneberg | 3 | 7^{7} | 6 | 6

=== Top half ===
==== Section 1 ====
First round
1 | (Australia) M Woodforde (Australia) T Woodbridge | 6 | 6
(Austria) A Antonitsch (Netherlands) M Oosting | 3 | 4
(Sweden) P Henricsson (Nigeria) N Odizor | 3 | 4
(Sweden) H Holm (Norway) B-O Pedersen | 6 | 6
(Spain) T Carbonell (Argentina) C Miniussi | 2^{r}
(Sweden) J Apell (New Zealand) B Steven | 3
(South Africa) W Ferreira (South Africa) P Norval | 7 | 7
16 | (South Africa) D Adams (Commonwealth of Independent States) A Olhovskiy | 6 | 5
10 | (United States) L Jensen (Australia) L Warder | 2 | 6 | 4
(United States) T Ho (United States) T Martin | 6 | 3 | 6
(Netherlands) J Eltingh (Netherlands) P Haarhuis | 7 | 6
(Australia) A Kratzmann (Australia) R Rasheed | 5 | 4
(Argentina) J Frana (Mexico) L Lavalle | 6 | 6 | 7
(Argentina) P Albano (Brazil) C Motta | 7 | 3 | 5
(United States) K Curren (South Africa) G Muller | 1 | 5
7 | (Netherlands) T Nijssen (Czechoslovakia) C Suk | 6 | 7

Second round
1 | (Australia) M Woodforde (Australia) T Woodbridge | 6 | 7
(Sweden) H Holm (Norway) B-O Pedersen | 4 | 6
(Sweden) J Apell (New Zealand) B Steven | 7 | 4 | 2
(South Africa) W Ferreira (South Africa) P Norval | 6 | 6 | 6
16 | (United States) T Ho (United States) T Martin | 5 | 2
(Netherlands) J Eltingh (Netherlands) P Haarhuis | 7 | 6
(Argentina) J Frana (Mexico) L Lavalle | 3 | 4
7 | (Netherlands) T Nijssen (Czechoslovakia) C Suk | 6 | 6

Third round
1 | (Australia) M Woodforde (Australia) T Woodbridge | 6 | 6
(South Africa) W Ferreira (South Africa) P Norval | 1 | 3
(Netherlands) J Eltingh (Netherlands) P Haarhuis | 7 | 6
7 | (Netherlands) T Nijssen (Czechoslovakia) C Suk | 6 | 2

Quarterfinals
1 | (Australia) M Woodforde (Australia) T Woodbridge | 6 | 3 | 6 | 6
(Netherlands) J Eltingh (Netherlands) P Haarhuis | 3 | 6 | 3 | 4

==== Section 2 ====
First round
4 | (United States) K Jones (United States) R Leach | 7 | 6
(United States) J Brown (Sweden) P Lundgren | 5 | 2
(United States) D DiLucia (United States) B MacPhie | 7 | 6 | 6
(Netherlands) HJ Davids (Belgium) L Pimek | 6 | 7 | 7
(United States) P McEnroe (United States) J Stark | 6 | 7
(United States) J Palmer (United States) D Wheaton | 2 | 6
(United States) B Pearce (South Africa) B Talbot | 2 | 4
14 | (United States) K Flach (United States) T Witsken | 6 | 6
11 | (Australia) M Kratzmann (Australia) W Masur | 6 | 6
(United States) D Eisenman (United States) T Scherman | 4 | 2
(United States) D Randall (United States) K Thorne | 4 | 6 | 4
(Sweden) R Båthman (Sweden) R Bergh | 6 | 1 | 6
(United States) B Garnett (Sweden) T Svantesson | 3 | 3
(New Zealand) K Evernden (United States) G Layendecker | 6 | 6
(Zimbabwe) B Black (United States) T Nelson | 4 | 6 | 4
5 | (Switzerland) J Hlasek (Switzerland) M Rosset | 6 | 2 | 6

Second round
4 | (United States) K Jones (United States) R Leach | 6 | 6 | 6
(Netherlands) HJ Davids (Belgium) L Pimek | 3 | 7 | 3
(United States) P McEnroe (United States) J Stark | 6 | 7
14 | (United States) K Flach (United States) T Witsken | 2 | 6
11 | (Australia) M Kratzmann (Australia) W Masur | 2 | 6 | 6
(Sweden) R Båthman (Sweden) R Bergh | 6 | 3 | 7
(New Zealand) K Evernden (United States) G Layendecker | 6 | 1 | 7
5 | (Switzerland) J Hlasek (Switzerland) M Rosset | 3 | 6 | 6

Third round
4 | (United States) K Jones (United States) R Leach | 6 | 7
(United States) P McEnroe (United States) J Stark | 2 | 6
(Sweden) R Båthman (Sweden) R Bergh | 2 | 4
(New Zealand) K Evernden (United States) G Layendecker | 6 | 6

Quarterfinals
4 | (United States) K Jones (United States) R Leach | 6 | 7 | 6
(New Zealand) K Evernden (United States) G Layendecker | 3 | 6 | 2

=== Bottom half ===
==== Section 3 ====
First round
6 | (United States) J McEnroe (Germany) M Stich | 6 | 6
(United States) C Cocotos (United States) A O'Brien | 3 | 4
(United States) S Cannon (United States) G Van Emburgh | 7 | 6 | 1
(Italy) D Nargiso (Spain) J Sánchez | 5 | 4
(Australia) C Limberger (Czechoslovakia) T Anzari | 7 | 6 | 7
(United States) K Kinnear (United States) S Salumaa | 6 | 7 | 6
(Czechoslovakia) M Damm (Australia) S Stolle | 6 | 3
12 | (United States) S Davis (United States) D Pate | 7 | 6
13 | (Spain) S Casal (Spain) E Sánchez | 7 | 7
(Netherlands) M Schapers (Czechoslovakia) D Vacek | 5 | 6
(Italy) G Pozzi (Finland) O Rahnasto | 2 | 6 | 6
(Spain) F Clavet (Spain) F Roig | 6 | 4 | 3
(Czechoslovakia) P Korda (United States) J Pugh | 6 | 3
(United States) F Montana (United States) B Shelton | 7 | 6
(United States) M Briggs (United States) T Kronemann | 6 | 5 | 3
3 | (Australia) J Fitzgerald (Sweden) A Järryd | 3 | 7 | 6

Second round
6 | (United States) J McEnroe (Germany) M Stich | 6 | 6
(United States) S Cannon (United States) G Van Emburgh | 3 | 4
(Australia) C Limberger (Czechoslovakia) T Anzari | 4 | 3
12 | (United States) S Davis (United States) D Pate | 6 | 6
13 | (Spain) S Casal (Spain) E Sánchez | 7 | 6
(Italy) G Pozzi (Finland) O Rahnasto | 5 | 4
(United States) F Montana (United States) B Shelton | 6 | 2 | 4
3 | (Australia) J Fitzgerald (Sweden) A Järryd | 1 | 6 | 6

Third round
6 | (United States) J McEnroe (Germany) M Stich | 6 | 4 | 6
12 | (United States) S Davis (United States) D Pate | 3 | 6 | 4
13 | (Spain) S Casal (Spain) E Sánchez | 7 | 2 | 6
3 | (Australia) J Fitzgerald (Sweden) A Järryd | 5 | 6 | 3

Quarterfinals
6 | (United States) J McEnroe (Germany) M Stich | 6 | 6 | 6 | 7 | 6
13 | (Spain) S Casal (Spain) E Sánchez | 7 | 3 | 7 | 6 | 4

==== Section 4 ====
First round
8 | (United States) S DeVries (Australia) D Macpherson | 7 | 7
(United States) C Beckman (Australia) B Dyke | 5 | 6
(Australia) N Borwick (Australia) S Youl | 6 | 6 | 7
(United States) TJ Middleton (Netherlands) J Siemerink | 4 | 7 | 6
(Italy) O Camporese (Croatia) G Ivanišević | 6 | 6
(The Bahamas) R Smith (Kenya) P Wekesa | 3 | 4
(United States) B Gilbert (United States) V Spadea | 1 | 4
9 | (United States) P Galbraith (South Africa) D Visser | 6 | 6
15 | (Canada) G Connell (Canada) G Michibata | 6 | 6
(Brazil) R Acioly (South Africa) J-L de Jager | 3 | 4
(United Kingdom) N Broad (South Africa) S Kruger | 7 | 6
(United States) P Annacone (United States) M Lucena | 6 | 3
(Italy) C Brandi (Latvia) Ģ Dzelde | 6 | 3 | 4
(South Africa) R Deppe (South Africa) B Haygarth | 3 | 6 | 6
(Brazil) L Mattar (Brazil) J Oncins | 6 | 4
2 | (United States) J Grabb (United States) R Reneberg | 7 | 6

Second round
8 | (United States) S DeVries (Australia) D Macpherson | 6 | 3
(Australia) N Borwick (Australia) S Youl | 7 | 6
(Italy) O Camporese (Croatia) G Ivanišević | 3 | 1
9 | (United States) P Galbraith (South Africa) D Visser | 6 | 6
15 | (Canada) G Connell (Canada) G Michibata | 6 | 7
(United Kingdom) N Broad (South Africa) S Kruger | 3 | 6
(South Africa) R Deppe (South Africa) B Haygarth | 6 | 6 | 4
2 | (United States) J Grabb (United States) R Reneberg | 4 | 7 | 6

Third round
(Australia) N Borwick (Australia) S Youl | 3 | 7 | 6
9 | (United States) P Galbraith (South Africa) D Visser | 6 | 6 | 4
15 | (Canada) G Connell (Canada) G Michibata | 4 | 7 | 3
2 | (United States) J Grabb (United States) R Reneberg | 6 | 6 | 6

Quarterfinals
(Australia) N Borwick (Australia) S Youl | 4 | 6 | 3
2 | (United States) J Grabb (United States) R Reneberg | 6 | 7 | 6
