= Thomas Högstedt =

Swedish tennis player

- Country (sports): Sweden
- Residence: Stockholm, Sweden
- Born: 21 September 1963 (age 63) Mariestad, Sweden
- Height: 1.90 m (6 ft 3 in)
- Turned pro: 1981
- Plays: Right-handed
- Prize money: US$609,935

Singles
- Career record: 89–152
- Career titles: 1
- Highest ranking: No. 38 (19 Sep 1983)

Grand Slam singles results
- Australian Open: 2R (1981)
- French Open: 2R (1982, 1983)
- Wimbledon: 2R (1989)
- US Open: 2R (1983, 1984, 1989)

Doubles
- Career record: 1–3

Coaching career (2006–)
- Tommy Haas (2006–2008); Li Na (2008–2010); Maria Sharapova (2010–2013; 2017–2019); Caroline Wozniacki (2014); Simona Halep (2015); Eugenie Bouchard (2015–2016; 2016–2017); Madison Keys (2016); Johanna Konta (2020); Jeļena Ostapenko (2020)

Thomas Högstedt (born 21 September 1963) is a Swedish tennis coach and former professional player. He is the former coach of Tommy Haas, Magnus Norman, Eugenie Bouchard, Caroline Wozniacki, Maria Sharapova, Li Na, Simona Halep, Madison Keys and Johanna Konta.

== Career ==
Högstedt was the junior singles winner at the 1981 US Open, defeating West German player Hans Schwaier in the final.

The following year he had a win over rising star Mats Wilander at Cincinnati and was a semi-finalist at Basel and Båstad.

He won his only Grand Prix tournament at Ferrera in 1983, without dropping a set. That year he also reached the quarter-finals in Milan.

In both 1987 and 1988, Högstedt had some success at New York City's OTB Open, with semi-final appearances.

Högstedt had the best win of his Grand Slam career at the 1989 Wimbledon Championships, defeating sixth seed Jakob Hlasek in the opening round. He also reached the quarter-finals of a tournament in Rio de Janeiro and the Australian Indoor Championships.

In 1990 he appeared in all four Grand Slams, for the first time in his career, but was unable to progress past the first round in any of them. His best performances on the tour came at Rotterdam, Singapore and Tokyo, where he made the quarter-finals. In Tokyo he defeated world 6 Andrés Gómez, the second time in their two meetings that he had got the better of the Ecuadorian, having also beaten him at Basel in 1982.

He was appointed coach of five time Grand Slam winner Maria Sharapova in late 2010, having previously had success coaching Tommy Haas and Li Na, who were both top 10 players under his tutelage. The pair ended their relationship shortly after Sharapova's second round loss to Michelle Larcher de Brito at the 2013 Wimbledon Championships.

Högstedt was the coach of former Wimbledon finalist Eugenie Bouchard from December 2016 to September 2017, whom he also coached from October 2015 until April 2016. He was also the coach of American Madison Keys from May to December 2016. As of 2018, he was back coaching Maria Sharapova starting before the clay court season. He also coached Jeļena Ostapenko on a trial basis in 2020.

== Grand Prix career finals ==
=== Singles: 1 (1–0) ===
Result	W–L	Date	Tournament	Surface	Opponent	Score
Win	1–0	Nov 1983	Ferrara, Italy	Carpet	(United States) Butch Walts	6–4, 6–4

== Challenger titles ==
=== Singles: (1) ===
No.	Year	Tournament	Surface	Opponent	Score
1.	1986	Thessaloniki, Greece	Hard	(Austria) Alex Antonitsch	6–2, 6–2
