= Shane Barr =

Australian tennis player

- Country (sports): Australia; Hong Kong
- Residence: Aspley, Queensland, Australia
- Born: 21 October 1969 (age 57) Redcliffe, Queensland, Australia
- Height: 193 cm (6 ft 4 in)
- Plays: Right handed
- Prize money: $72,239

Singles
- Career record: 6–16
- Career titles: 0; 1 Challenger, 0 Futures
- Highest ranking: No. 160 (7 November 1988)

Grand Slam singles results
- Australian Open: 2R (1987)
- Wimbledon: 1R (1988)

Doubles
- Career record: 8–12
- Career titles: 0; 0 Challenger, 0 Futures
- Highest ranking: No. 192 (31 October 1988)

Grand Slam doubles results
- Australian Open: 2R (1988, 1990)

Grand Slam mixed doubles results
- Australian Open: QF (1987)
- Wimbledon: 2R (1988)
- Last updated on: 7 August 2022.

Shane Barr (born 21 October 1969) is a former professional tennis player from Australia.

== Career ==
Barr was the boys' singles champion at the 1985 Australian Open, beating Steve Furlong in the final. Also that year, Barr was a member of the Australian team which won the World Youth Cup, a junior version of the Davis Cup. He was twice a runner-up in the boys' doubles at Grand Slams, in the 1986 Wimbledon Championships with Hubert Karrasch and partnering Bryan Roe in the 1987 Australian Open. Barr and Roe were defeated in the final by the Jason Stoltenberg/Todd Woodbridge combination and it was also Woodbridge that beat him in the singles semi-finals.

In the 1987 Australian Open, Barr also participated in the men's draw and beat countryman Darren Cahill in the first round (his only Grand Slam singles win), before being knocked out of the tournament by Tim Wilkison. (Note: The junior's event didn't begin until the second week, so Barr was able to compete in both draws) He also made the mixed doubles quarter-finals, partnering Michelle Jaggard. The Australian twice made the second round of the men's doubles at his home event, with Kim Warwick in 1988 and Neil Borwick two years later.

He had wins over three top-50 players on the Grand Prix tennis circuit. In 1987 he eliminated sixth seed Wally Masur from the Swan Premium Open in Sydney and the following year once again defeated Cahill, now 25 in the world, in the Queensland Open. His other big win came when he beat Yugoslavian Slobodan Živojinović en route to a quarter-final appearance in the 1989 Queensland Open. He only narrowly missed out on a spot in the semi-finals, losing his quarter-final match to Niclas Kroon in a third set tiebreak. Another notable performance was at the 1988 Stella Artois Championships (Queen's), where he won a set against Stefan Edberg. The Swede would go on to win Wimbledon that year.

Barr lived in Hong Kong in the 1990s, started playing tennis there in 1996, and played in the Davis Cup for the territory, which included a tie against the Philippines in 1998.

His career-best world ranking was No. 160 in 1988. He played in four Australian Opens from 1987 to 1990.

Apart from tennis, Barr's family was also behind the ice-cream chain Cold Rock in Australia. He and his father Selwyn opened the first of their Cold Rock ice cream stores in 1996.

== ATP Challenger and ITF Futures finals ==
=== Singles: 2 (1–1) ===
Legend ATP Challenger (1–1) ITF Futures (0–0)	Finals by surface Hard (1–0) Clay (0–0) Grass (0–0) Carpet (0–1)

Result	W–L	Date	Tournament	Tier	Surface	Opponent	Score
Win	1–0	Oct 1988	Nugra Santana, Indonesia	Challenger	Hard	(New Zealand) Steve Guy	1–6, 7–5, 6–3
Loss	1–1	Nov 1988	Tasmania, Australia	Challenger	Carpet	(Australia) Todd Woodbridge	3–6, 6–7

=== Doubles: 3 (0–3) ===
Legend ATP Challenger (0–3) ITF Futures (0–0)	Finals by surface Hard (0–2) Clay (0–0) Grass (0–0) Carpet (0–1)

Result	W–L	Date	Tournament	Tier	Surface	Partner	Opponents	Score
Loss	0–1	Apr 1986	Nagoya, Japan	Challenger	Hard	(United States) Scott McCain	(New Zealand) David Mustard (New Zealand) Russell Simpson	5–7, 7–5, 4–6
Loss	0–2	Nov 1988	Tasmania, Australia	Challenger	Carpet	(Australia) Roger Rasheed	(Australia) Charlton Eagle (Australia) Paul Mick	6–7, 6–4, 6–7
Loss	0–3	Oct 1989	Brisbane, Australia	Challenger	Hard	(United States) Ted Scherman	(Australia) Desmond Tyson (Australia) Brett Custer	3–6, 7–6, 1–6

== Junior Grand Slam finals ==
=== Singles: 1 (1 title) ===
Result	Year	Tournament	Surface	Opponent	Score
Win	1985	Australian Open	Hard	(Australia) Steve Furlong	7–6, 6–7, 6–3

=== Doubles: 2 (2 runner-ups) ===
Result	Year	Tournament	Surface	Partner	Opponents	Score
Loss	1986	Wimbledon	Grass	(Canada) Hubert Karrasch	(Spain) Tomas Carbonell (Czech Republic) Petr Korda	1–6, 1–6
Loss	1987	Australian Open	Grass	(Australia) Bryan Roe	(Australia) Jason Stoltenberg (Australia) Todd Woodbridge	2–6, 4–6
