= Brett Custer =

Australian tennis player

- Full name: Brett Steven Custer
- Country (sports): Australia
- Born: 1 April 1968 (age 57) Sydney, Australia
- Height: 183 cm (6 ft 0 in)
- Plays: Right-handed
- Prize money: $34,385

Singles
- Career record: 1–5
- Career titles: 0; 0 Challenger, 0 Futures
- Highest ranking: No. 357 (28 November 1988)

Grand Slam singles results
- Australian Open: 1R (1989)
- Wimbledon: 1R (1986)

Doubles
- Career record: 7–15
- Career titles: 0; 3 Challenger, 0 Futures
- Highest ranking: No. 198 (18 December 1989)

Grand Slam doubles results
- Australian Open: 3R (1985)
- Wimbledon: Q1 (1985, 1988, 1989)
- Last updated on: 17 June 2022.

Brett Steven Custer (born 1 April 1968) is a former professional tennis player from Australia.

== Biography ==
Custer, the son of Noel and Dawn, grew up in the Sydney suburb of Normanhurst. His family are distant relatives of the famed General Custer.

As a junior he held national titles in the Under 12, 14, 16 and 18 categories. Custer, who left school to focus on his burgeoning tennis career, was nurtured by John Newcombe and Tony Roche as part of the Custom Credit Operation scheme. While still only 15 he featured in the men's doubles draw at the 1983 Australian Open with fellow junior David Macpherson. The same pair would team up to win the boys' doubles event at the 1985 Australian Open, having been losing finalists the previous year. They defeated Czechoslovaks Petr Korda and Cyril Suk in the final. At the same tournament the teenagers also made it to the round of 16 in the men's doubles. Their run included a win over the 10th seeded pair, Shlomo Glickstein and Shahar Perkiss from Israel, before it was ended by the top seeds in the draw, Joakim Nyström and Mats Wilander.

He played professionally on the Grand Prix (now ATP Tour) and Challenger circuits with limited success. At the 1986 Wimbledon Championships he won his way through qualifying, then was beaten by Johan Kriek in the first round. His best result on tour in singles was a second round appearance at the 1988 Australian Indoor Tennis Championships in Sydney. As a doubles player he made it into the world's top 200, won three Challenger titles and was a semi-finalist with Des Tyson at the Brisbane Grand Prix tournament in 1989. He played in the men's doubles draw at the Australian Open a total of five times. His only appearance in singles came as a wildcard at the 1989 Australian Open, where he lost to Pat Cash in the opening round.

Now based in the United States, Custer is the Tennis Director at Stone Creek, a club and spa in Covington, Louisiana.

== ATP Challenger and ITF Futures finals ==
=== Doubles: 4 (3–1) ===
Legend ATP Challenger (3–1) ITF Futures (0–0)	Finals by surface Hard (1–0) Clay (0–1) Grass (0–0) Carpet (2–0)

Result	W–L	Date	Tournament	Tier	Surface	Partner	Opponents	Score
Loss	0–1	May 1985	Salzburg, Austria	Challenger	Clay	(Australia) Simon Youl	(Germany) Martin Sinner (Germany) Michael Stich	walkover
Win	1–1	Oct 1989	Brisbane, Australia	Challenger	Hard	(Australia) Desmond Tyson	(Australia) Shane Barr (United States) Ted Scherman	6–3, 6–7, 6–1
Win	2–1	Sep 1990	Canberra, Australia	Challenger	Carpet	(Australia) Peter Doohan	(South Africa) David Adams (Australia) Jamie Morgan	6–3, 6–4
Win	3–1	Nov 1990	Hobart, Australia	Challenger	Carpet	(Australia) David Macpherson	(New Zealand) Brett Steven (Australia) Sandon Stolle	6–2, 6–7, 6–4

== Junior Grand Slam finals ==
=== Doubles: 2 (1 title, 1 runner-up) ===
Result	Year	Tournament	Surface	Partnet	Opponents	Score
Loss	1984	Australian Open	Hard	(Australia) David Macpherson	(Australia) Mike Baroch (Australia) Mark Kratzmann	2–6, 7–5, 5–7
Win	1985	Australian Open	Hard	(Australia) David Macpherson	(Czech Republic) Petr Korda (Czech Republic) Cyril Suk	7–5, 6–2
