= Ted Scherman =

American tennis player

- Full name: Ted Scherman
- Country (sports): United States
- Born: October 3, 1966 (age 58); San Francisco, United States
- Plays: Right-handed
- Prize money: $51,188

Singles
- Career record: 1–1
- Career titles: 0
- Highest ranking: No. 482 (Sept 10, 1990)

Doubles
- Career record: 8–20
- Career titles: 0
- Highest ranking: No. 114 (June 8, 1992)

Grand Slam doubles results
- Australian Open: 1R (1990, 1992)
- Wimbledon: 1R (1992)
- US Open: 1R (1992)

Ted Scherman (born October 3, 1966) is a former professional tennis player from the United States.

== Biography ==
Scherman was born in San Francisco and in 1985 represented the United States in the Junior Davis Cup competition.

In the late 1980s he played at UC Berkeley, where he achieved All-American honors in 1987 and 1988. Following his graduation in 1989 he turned professional.

A right-handed player, Scherman played in the main draw of the Queensland Open in 1989, beating Grant Connell in the first round, before being eliminated in the second round by Niclas Kroon.

Most of his appearances at the top level of the professional tour were in doubles. He made it to 114 in the world in that format and was a semi-finalist in the ATP Tour tournament at Bordeaux in 1991, with Ģirts Dzelde. A two-time Challenger title winner, he also competed in the main draw of four Grand Slam tournaments.

== Challenger titles ==
=== Doubles: (2) ===
No.	Year	Tournament	Surface	Partner	Opponents	Score
1.	1989	Aptos, U. S.	Hard	(United States) Steve DeVries	(United States) Bryan Shelton (United States) Kenny Thorne	6–3, 1–6, 6–2
2.	1990	Guam	Hard	(United States) Steve DeVries	(United States) Matt Anger (United Kingdom) Andrew Castle	6–1, 3–6, 7–6
