= Scott Warner (tennis) =

American tennis player

- Country (sports): United States
- Residence: Hollywood, Florida
- Born: December 22, 1965 (age 59) Sacramento, California
- Height: 6 ft 5 in (1.96 m)
- Plays: Right-handed
- Prize money: $53,917

Singles
- Career record: 3–7
- Career titles: 0
- Highest ranking: No. 180 (October 2, 1989)

Grand Slam singles results
- Wimbledon: 1R (1989)

Doubles
- Career record: 7–10
- Career titles: 1
- Highest ranking: No. 85 (November 13, 1989)

Grand Slam doubles results
- Australian Open: 1R (1990)
- French Open: 1R (1990)
- Wimbledon: 1R (1989)

Scott Warner (born December 22, 1965) is a former professional tennis player from the United States.

== Career ==
Warner attended the University of Nevada, Las Vegas and won the PCAA singles title in both 1986 and 1987. He earned All-American honors in 1987 when he made the quarter-finals of the NCAA Championships.

The American had his best year on tour in 1989. He made his Grand Prix debut at Key Biscayne and defeated Argentina's Martín Jaite in the first round, before being eliminated in the second round by Mats Wilander. At the 1989 OTB Open, Warner made it to the quarter-finals, his best showing in a Grand Prix tournament. He got through qualifying at the 1989 Wimbledon Championships to make his only appearance in the main singles draw of a Grand Slam event and lost in the opening round to Miloslav Mečíř. With partner David Pate, Warner won the men's doubles title at the 1989 Australian Indoor Championships. He also won two Challenger tournaments that year.

== Grand Prix career finals ==
=== Doubles: 1 (1–0) ===
Result	W–L	Date	Tournament	Surface	Partner	Opponents	Score
Win	1–0	Oct 1989	Sydney Indoor, Australia	Hard	(United States) David Pate	(Australia) Darren Cahill (Australia) Mark Kratzmann	6–3, 6–7, 7–5

== Challenger titles ==
=== Doubles: (2) ===
No.	Date	Tournament	Surface	Partner	Opponents	Score
1.	1989	Winnetka, United States	Hard	(Sweden) Ville Jansson	(United States) Bill Benjes (United States) Arkie Engle	6–7, 6–4, 6–4
2.	1989	Bergen, Norway	Carpet	(Canada) Grant Connell	(Sweden) Rikard Bergh (United States) Kelly Jones	7–5, 6–4
