= Simon Youl =

Australian tennis player (born 1965)

- Country (sports): Australia
- Residence: Elephant's Pass, Tasmania, Australia
- Born: 1 July 1965 (age 61) Symmons Plains, Tasmania, Australia
- Height: 185 cm (6 ft 1 in)
- Turned pro: 1982
- Retired: 1994
- Plays: Right-handed (one-handed backhand)
- Prize money: $930,856

Singles
- Career record: 91–138
- Career titles: 2; 5 Challenger, 0 Futures
- Highest ranking: No. 80 (28 September 1992)

Grand Slam singles results
- Australian Open: 4R (1990)
- French Open: 3R (1985)
- Wimbledon: 4R (1988)
- US Open: 1R (1988, 1990, 1991, 1992)

Other tournaments
- Olympic Games: QF (1984, demonstration)

Doubles
- Career record: 104–144
- Career titles: 2; 4 Challenger, 0 Futures
- Highest ranking: No. 63 (20 April 1992)

Grand Slam doubles results
- Australian Open: QF (1992)
- French Open: 3R (1986, 1990)
- Wimbledon: QF (1986, 1989)
- US Open: QF (1992)

Grand Slam mixed doubles results
- Australian Open: 2R (1987)
- French Open: SF (1990)
- Wimbledon: 3R (1988)
- Last updated on: 23 October 2021.

Simon John Arthur Youl (born 1 July 1965) is a former professional tennis player from Australia.

== Tennis career ==
Youl was an Australian Institute of Sport scholarship holder from 1981 to 1984.

=== Juniors ===
As a junior player, Youl formed a successful doubles partnership with his fellow Australian player Mark Kratzmann. In 1983, the pair won the Boys' Doubles titles at the French Open, Wimbledon and the US Open. In singles, he reached three slam finals, attaining a ranking as high as No. 5 in the junior world rankings in 1983.

=== Pro tour ===
As a professional player, Youl won two top-level singles titles (at Schenectady in 1989, and Singapore in 1992), and two tour doubles titles (Casablanca in 1990, and Bucharest in 1994). His best singles performances at Grand Slam events came in reaching the fourth round at Wimbledon in 1988 (lost to Stefan Edberg) and the Australian Open in 1990 (lost to Ivan Lendl).

Youl's career-high rankings were world No. 80 in singles and world No. 63 in doubles (both in 1992).

=== Retirement ===
He retired from the professional tour in 1994 (playing one Challenger event the following year). Since retiring as a player, he has worked as a tennis coach in Hobart, Tasmania.

== ATP career finals ==
=== Singles: 2 (2 titles) ===
Legend Grand Slam tournaments (0–0) ATP World Tour Finals (0–0) ATP Masters Series (0–0) ATP Championship Series (0–0) ATP World Series (2–0)	Titles by surface Hard (2–0) Clay (0–0) Grass (0–0) Carpet (0–0)	Titles by setting Outdoor (2–0) Indoor (0–0)

Result	W–L	Date	Tournament	Tier	Surface	Opponent	Score
Win	1–0	Jul 1989	Schenectady, United States	World Series	Hard	(United States) Scott Davis	2–6, 6–4, 6–4
Win	2–0	Apr 1992	Singapore, Singapore	World Series	Hard	(Netherlands) Paul Haarhuis	6–4, 6–1

=== Doubles: 3 (2 titles, 1 runner-up) ===
Legend Grand Slam tournaments (0–0) ATP World Tour Finals (0–0) ATP Masters 1000 (0–0) ATP Championship Series (0–0) ATP World Series (2–1)	Titles by surface Hard (0–1) Clay (2–0) Grass (0–0) Carpet (0–0)	Titles by setting Outdoor (2–1) Indoor (0–0)

Result	W–L	Date	Tournament	Tier	Surface	Partner	Opponents	Score
Loss	0–1	Oct 1989	Brisbane, Australia	Grand Prix	Hard	(Australia) Broderick Dyke	(Australia) Darren Cahill (Australia) Mark Kratzmann	4–6, 7–5, 0–6
Win	1–1	Mar 1990	Casablanca, Morocco	World Series	Clay	(Australia) Todd Woodbridge	(Netherlands) Paul Haarhuis (Netherlands) Mark Koevermans	6–3, 6–1
Win	2–1	Sep 1994	Bucharest, Romania	World Series	Clay	(Australia) Wayne Arthurs	(Spain) José Antonio Conde (Spain) Jordi Arrese	6–4, 6–4

== ATP Challenger and ITF Futures finals ==
=== Singles: 7 (5–2) ===
Legend ATP Challenger (5–2) ITF Futures (0–0)	Finals by surface Hard (3–0) Clay (1–2) Grass (0–0) Carpet (1–0)

Result	W–L	Date	Tournament	Tier	Surface	Opponent	Score
Win	1–0	Nov 1990	Hobart, Australia	Challenger	Carpet	(Australia) Jamie Morgan	7–6, 7–6
Loss	1–1	Feb 1991	Jakarta, Indonesia	Challenger	Clay	(Czech Republic) Václav Roubíček	3–6, 6–3, 3–6
Win	2–1	Nov 1991	Auckland, New Zealand	Challenger	Hard	(Australia) Patrick Rafter	3–6, 6–3, 6–1
Loss	2–2	Feb 1992	Jakarta, Indonesia	Challenger	Clay	(Italy) Claudio Pistolesi	6–1, 3–6, 2–6
Win	3–2	Apr 1992	Singapore, Singapore	Challenger	Hard	(Netherlands) Paul Haarhuis	6–4, 6–1
Win	4–2	Jul 1993	Scheveningen, Netherlands	Challenger	Clay	(Belgium) Bart Wuyts	7–5, 1–6, 6–4
Win	5–2	Jul 1994	Newcastle, United Kingdom	Challenger	Hard	(Australia) Brent Larkham	6–1, 7–6

=== Doubles: 12 (4–8) ===
Legend ATP Challenger (4–8) ITF Futures (0–0)	Finals by surface Hard (2–3) Clay (1–3) Grass (0–0) Carpet (1–2)

Result	W–L	Date	Tournament	Tier	Surface	Partner	Opponents	Score
Loss	0–1	May 1989	Salzburg, Austria	Challenger	Clay	(Australia) Brett Custer	(Germany) Martin Sinner (Germany) Michael Stich	walkover
Win	1–1	Apr 1991	Nagoya, Japan	Challenger	Hard	(United States) Glenn Layendecker	(Nigeria) Nduka Odizor (Australia) Sandon Stolle	3–6, 7–6, 7–6
Loss	1–2	Nov 1991	Hobart, Australia	Challenger	Carpet	(Australia) Bret Richardson	(Australia) Michael Brown (Australia) Andrew Kratzmann	6–3, 3–6, 6–7
Win	2–2	Nov 1991	Christchurch, New Zealand	Challenger	Carpet	(Australia) Neil Borwick	(Australia) Jamie Morgan (Australia) Sandon Stolle	7–5, 7–6
Loss	2–3	Feb 1993	Indian Wells, United States	Challenger	Hard	(Australia) Neil Borwick	(Australia) Patrick Rafter (Australia) Jason Stoltenberg	4–6, 3–6
Loss	2–4	Jan 1994	Wellington, New Zealand	Challenger	Hard	(Australia) Sandon Stolle	(United States) Martin Blackman (United States) Kenny Thorne	7–6, 3–6, 4–6
Loss	2–5	Feb 1994	Wolfsburg, Germany	Challenger	Carpet	(Australia) Wayne Arthurs	(United States) Rich Benson (Malaysia) Adam Malik	6–7, 4–6
Loss	2–6	Apr 1994	Puerto Vallarta, Mexico	Challenger	Hard	(Australia) Paul Kilderry	(Argentina) Pablo Albano (Venezuela) Nicolás Pereira	4–6, 6–3, 6–7
Win	3–6	Jul 1994	Newcastle, United Kingdom	Challenger	Hard	(United Kingdom) Neil Broad	(Australia) Joshua Eagle (Netherlands) Tom Kempers	6–4, 6–7, 6–4
Loss	3–7	Aug 1994	Graz, Austria	Challenger	Clay	(Australia) Wayne Arthurs	(Netherlands) Hendrik Jan Davids (Netherlands) Stephen Noteboom	6–4, 3–6, 6–7
Win	4–7	Sep 1994	Merano, Italy	Challenger	Clay	(Sweden) Tomas Nydahl	(Portugal) Emanuel Couto (Portugal) João Cunha-Silva	6–4, 4–6, 6–4
Loss	4–8	Sep 1994	Venice, Italy	Challenger	Clay	(Sweden) Tomas Nydahl	(Italy) Cristian Brandi (Italy) Federico Mordegan	3–6, 6–4, 3–6

== Junior Grand Slam finals ==
=== Singles: 3 (3 runner-ups) ===
Result	Year	Championship	Surface	Opponent	Score
Loss	1982	Australian Open	Hard	(Australia) Mark Kratzmann	3–6, 5–7
Loss	1983	Australian Open	Hard	(Sweden) Stefan Edberg	4–6, 4–6
Loss	1983	US Open	Hard	(Sweden) Stefan Edberg	2–6, 4–6

=== Doubles: 3 (3 titles) ===
Result	Year	Championship	Surface	Partnet	Opponents	Score
Win	1983	French Open	Clay	(Australia) Mark Kratzmann	(Sweden) Carin Anderholm (Sweden) Olli Rahnasto	6–4, 6–4
Win	1983	Wimbledon	Grass	(Australia) Mark Kratzmann	(Romania) Mihnea Nastase (Finland) Olli Rahnasto	6–4, 6–4
Win	1983	US Open	Hard	(Australia) Mark Kratzmann	(United States) Patrick McEnroe (United States) Brad Pearce	6–1, 7–6

== Performance timelines ==
Key
W	F	SF	QF	#R	RR	Q#	DNQ	A	NH

(W) winner; (F) finalist; (SF) semifinalist; (QF) quarterfinalist; (#R) rounds 4, 3, 2, 1; (RR) round-robin stage; (Q#) qualification round; (DNQ) did not qualify; (A) absent; (NH) not held; (SR) strike rate (events won / competed); (W–L) win–loss record.

=== Singles ===
Tournament	1982	1983	1984	1985	1986	1987	1988	1989	1990	1991	1992	1993	1994	1995	SR	W–L	Win %
Grand Slam tournaments
Australian Open	1R	2R	2R	2R	A	1R	2R	1R	4R	1R	2R	1R	Q2	A	0 / 11	8–11	42%
French Open	A	1R	1R	3R	1R	A	1R	1R	1R	A	1R	Q3	Q3	A	0 / 8	2–8	20%
Wimbledon	A	Q2	1R	Q2	1R	1R	4R	1R	1R	Q2	2R	1R	1R	Q1	0 / 9	4–9	31%
US Open	A	A	A	A	A	A	1R	A	1R	1R	1R	A	A	A	0 / 4	0–4	0%
Win–loss	0–1	1–2	1–3	3–2	0–2	0–2	4–4	0–3	3–4	0–2	2–4	0–2	0–1	0–0	0 / 32	14–32	30%
National representation
Summer Olympics	NH		QF	Not Held			A	Not Held			A	Not Held			0 / 1	2–1	67%
ATP Masters Series
Indian Wells	A	A	A	A	A	A	A	A	A	A	1R	Q2	A	A	0 / 1	0–1	0%
Miami	A	A	A	A	A	A	A	A	A	A	A	1R	A	A	0 / 1	0–1	0%
Canada	A	A	A	A	A	A	2R	2R	1R	3R	3R	A	A	A	0 / 5	6–5	55%
Cincinnati	A	A	A	A	A	A	A	A	A	A	2R	A	A	A	0 / 1	1–1	50%
Win–loss	0–0	0–0	0–0	0–0	0–0	0–0	1–1	1–1	0–1	2–1	3–3	0–1	0–0	0–0	0 / 3	7–8	47%

=== Doubles ===
Tournament	1982	1983	1984	1985	1986	1987	1988	1989	1990	1991	1992	1993	1994	SR	W–L	Win %
Grand Slam tournaments
Australian Open	1R	2R	2R	1R	A	2R	2R	A	3R	1R	QF	2R	1R	0 / 0	10–11	48%
French Open	A	A	2R	2R	2R	1R	1R	A	3R	2R	1R	1R	A	0 / 9	6–9	40%
Wimbledon	A	Q2	1R	1R	QF	Q1	2R	QF	1R	3R	3R	2R	Q1	0 / 9	12–9	57%
US Open	A	A	A	A	A	A	3R	A	1R	2R	QF	A	A	0 / 4	6–4	60%
Win–loss	0–1	1–1	2–3	1–3	4–2	1–2	4–4	3–1	4–4	4–4	8–4	2–3	0–1	0 / 33	28–33	46%
ATP Tour Masters 1000
Indian Wells Masters	A	A	A	A	A	A	A	A	A	A	1R	Q1	A	0 / 1	0–1	0%
Miami Open	A	A	A	A	A	A	A	A	A	2R	2R	3R	A	0 / 3	3–3	50%
Monte Carlo	A	A	A	1R	A	A	A	A	A	A	A	A	A	0 / 1	0–1	0%
Rome	A	A	A	A	1R	A	A	A	A	A	A	A	A	0 / 1	0–1	100%
Canada	A	A	A	A	A	A	2R	1R	2R	1R	2R	A	A	0 / 5	3–5	38%
Cincinnati	A	A	A	A	A	A	A	A	A	SF	A	A	A	0 / 1	3–1	75%
Win–loss	0–0	0–0	0–0	0–1	0–1	0–0	1–1	0–1	1–1	4–3	2–3	1–1	0–0	0 / 12	9–12	43%

=== Mixed doubles ===
Tournament	1987	1988	1989	1990	1991	1992	SR	W–L	Win %
Grand Slam tournaments
Australian Open	2R	A	A	A	A	1R	0 / 2	1–2	33%
French Open	A	1R	A	SF	A	A	0 / 2	4–2	67%
Wimbledon	1R	3R	1R	2R	1R	1R	0 / 6	3–6	33%
US Open	A	A	A	A	A	A	0 / 0	0–0	–
Win–loss	1–2	2–2	0–1	4–2	0–1	0–2	0 / 10	8–10	44%
