= Australian Indoor Tennis Championships =

Australian Indoor Tennis Championship

Defunct tennis tournament
- Event name: Varied
- Tour: Grand Prix circuit (1973–1989); ATP Tour (1990–94)
- Founded: 1973
- Abolished: 1994
- Editions: 22
- Location: Sydney, Australia
- Venue: Hordern Pavilion (1973–1982); Sydney Entertainment Centre (1983–1994)
- Surface: Hard / indoor

The Australian Indoor Tennis Championship, also known as the Australian Indoor Championship, the Australian Indoor Open and the Sydney Indoor for short, was a professional men's tennis tournament was played in Sydney, Australia. The tournament was an initiative from John Newcombe and was part of an expanding Asian-Australian fall Grand Prix circuit. The event was played under various names as part of the Grand Prix tennis circuit from 1973 through 1989 and as part of the ATP Tour from 1990 through 1994. It was played on indoor hard courts at the Hordern Pavilion on the Sydney Showground through 1982 and at the Sydney Entertainment Centre beginning in 1983. The tournament was cancelled in June 1994 on financial grounds with tournament director and co-founder Graham Lovett citing insufficient television coverage and the difficulty of signing top players as the main reasons.

== History ==
From 1975 to 1989 the event was sponsored by the Custom Credit and Swan Premium.

== Records ==
- Most singles titles: John McEnroe 4
- Most consecutive singles titles: John McEnroe 4 (1980–1983)
- Most singles finals: Ivan Lendl 5

== Finals ==
=== Singles ===
Year	Tournament name	Champions	Runners-up	Score
1973	Australian Indoor Championships	(Australia) Rod Laver	(Australia) John Newcombe	3–6, 7–5, 6–3, 3–6, 6–4
1974	Australian Indoor Championships	(Australia) John Newcombe	(United States) Cliff Richey	6–4, 6–3, 6–4
1975	Custom Credit Indoor Tennis Tournament	(United States) Stan Smith	(United States) Robert Lutz	7–6, 6–2
1976	Custom Credit Indoors	(Australia) Geoff Masters	(United States) James Delaney	4–6, 6–3, 7–6, 6–3
1977	Custom Credit Australian Indoors	(United States) Jimmy Connors	(Australia) Ken Rosewall	7–5, 6–4, 6–2
1978	Custom Credit Australian Indoor Championships	(United States) Jimmy Connors	(Australia) Geoff Masters	6–0, 6–0, 6–4
1979	Custom Credit Australian Indoor	(United States) Vitas Gerulaitis	(Argentina) Guillermo Vilas	4–6, 6–3, 6–1, 7–6
1980	Custom Credit Australian Indoor Championships	(United States) John McEnroe	(United States) Vitas Gerulaitis	6–3, 6–4, 7–5
1981	Custom Credit Australian Indoor	(United States) John McEnroe	(United States) Roscoe Tanner	6–4, 7–5, 6–2
1982	Custom Credit Australian Indoor Championships	(United States) John McEnroe	(United States) Gene Mayer	6–4, 6–1, 6–4
1983	Custom Credit Australian Indoor Championships	(United States) John McEnroe	(France) Henri Leconte	6–1, 6–4, 7–5
1984	Custom Credit Australian Indoor Championships	(Sweden) Anders Järryd	(Czech Republic) Ivan Lendl	6–3, 6–2, 6–4
1985	Custom Credit Australian Indoor Tennis Championships	(Czech Republic) Ivan Lendl	(France) Henri Leconte	6–4, 6–4, 7–6
1986	Swan Premium Open	(Germany) Boris Becker	(Czech Republic) Ivan Lendl	3–6, 7–6, 6–2, 6–0
1987	Swan Premium Sydney Indoor	(Czech Republic) Ivan Lendl	(Australia) Pat Cash	6–4, 6–2, 6–4
1988	Swan Premium Open	(Socialist Federal Republic of Yugoslavia) Slobodan Živojinović	(United States) Richard Matuszewski	7–6, 6–3, 6–4
1989	Australian Indoor Tennis Championships	(Czech Republic) Ivan Lendl	(Sweden) Lars-Anders Wahlgren	6–2, 6–2, 6–1
1990	Australian Indoor Tennis Championships	(Germany) Boris Becker	(Sweden) Stefan Edberg	7–6, 6–4, 6–4
1991	Australian Indoor Tennis Championships	(Sweden) Stefan Edberg	(United States) Brad Gilbert	6–2, 6–2, 6–2
1992	Australian Indoor Tennis Championships	(Croatia) Goran Ivanišević	(Sweden) Stefan Edberg	6–4, 6–2, 6–4
1993	Ansett Australian Indoor Tennis Championships	(Peru) Jaime Yzaga	(Czech Republic) Petr Korda	6–4, 4–6, 7–6, 7–6
1994	Australian Indoor Tennis Championship	(Netherlands) Richard Krajicek	(Germany) Boris Becker	7–6^{(7–5)}, 7–6^{(9–7)}, 2–6, 6–3

=== Doubles ===
Year	Champions	Runners-up	Score
1973	(Australia) Rod Laver (Australia) John Newcombe	(Australia) Mal Anderson (Australia) Ken Rosewall	7–6, 6–2
1974	(Australia) Ross Case (Australia) Geoff Masters	(Australia) John Newcombe (Australia) Tony Roche	6–4, 6–4
1975	(United States) Brian Gottfried (Mexico) Raúl Ramírez	(Australia) Ross Case (Australia) Geoff Masters	6–4, 6–2
1976	(Egypt) Ismail El Shafei (New Zealand) Brian Fairlie	(Australia) Syd Ball (Australia) Kim Warwick	4–6, 6–4, 7–6
1977	(Australia) John Newcombe (Australia) Tony Roche	(Australia) Ross Case (Australia) Geoff Masters	6–7, 6–3, 6–1
1978	(Australia) John Newcombe (Australia) Tony Roche	(Australia) Mark Edmondson (Australia) John Marks	6–4, 6–3
1979	(Australia) Rod Frawley (Paraguay) Francisco González	(India) Vijay Amritraj (United States) Pat DuPré	W/O
1980	(United States) Peter Fleming (United States) John McEnroe	(United States) Tim Gullikson (South Africa) Johan Kriek	4–6, 6–1, 6–2
1981	(United States) Peter Fleming (United States) John McEnroe	(United States) Sherwood Stewart (United States) Ferdi Taygan	6–7, 7–6, 6–1
1982	(United States) John McEnroe (United States) Peter Rennert	(United States) Steve Denton (Australia) Mark Edmondson	6–3, 7–6
1983	(Australia) Mark Edmondson (United States) Sherwood Stewart	(United States) John McEnroe (United States) Peter Rennert	6–2, 6–4
1984	(Sweden) Anders Järryd (Sweden) Hans Simonsson	(Australia) Mark Edmondson (United States) Sherwood Stewart	6–4, 6–4
1985	(Australia) John Fitzgerald (Sweden) Anders Järryd	(Australia) Mark Edmondson (Australia) Kim Warwick	6–3, 6–2
1986	(Germany) Boris Becker (Australia) John Fitzgerald	(Australia) Peter McNamara (Australia) Paul McNamee	6–4, 7–6
1987	(Australia) Darren Cahill (Australia) Mark Kratzmann	(Germany) Boris Becker (United States) Robert Seguso	6–3, 6–2
1988	(Australia) Darren Cahill (Australia) John Fitzgerald	(United States) Marty Davis (Australia) Brad Drewett	6–3, 6–2
1989	(United States) David Pate (United States) Scott Warner	(Australia) Darren Cahill (Australia) Mark Kratzmann	6–3, 6–7, 7–5
1990	(Australia) Broderick Dyke (Sweden) Peter Lundgren	(Sweden) Stefan Edberg (Czech Republic) Ivan Lendl	6–2, 6–4
1991	(United States) Jim Grabb (United States) Richey Reneberg	(United States) Luke Jensen (Australia) Laurie Warder	6–4, 6–4
1992	(United States) Patrick McEnroe (United States) Jonathan Stark	(United States) Jim Grabb (United States) Richey Reneberg	6–2, 6–3
1993	(United States) Patrick McEnroe (United States) Richey Reneberg	(Germany) Alexander Mronz (Germany) Lars Rehmann	6–3, 7–5
1994	(Netherlands) Jacco Eltingh (Netherlands) Paul Haarhuis	(Zimbabwe) Byron Black (United States) Jonathan Stark	6–4, 7–6

== See also ==
- Sydney International
