= Mark Kratzmann =

Australian tennis player

- Full name: Mark Edward Kratzmann
- Country (sports): Australia
- Residence: Windera, Australia
- Born: 17 May 1966 (age 60) Murgon, Australia
- Height: 178 cm (5 ft 10 in)
- Turned pro: 1984
- Retired: 1992
- Plays: Left-handed (one-handed backhand)
- Prize money: $1,378,936

Singles
- Career record: 59–96
- Career titles: 0
- Highest ranking: No. 50 (26 March 1990)

Grand Slam singles results
- Australian Open: 4R (1987)
- French Open: 1R (1984, 1986, 1987, 1989, 1990)
- Wimbledon: 3R (1986, 1990)
- US Open: 2R (1990)

Doubles
- Career record: 267–203
- Career titles: 18; 0 Challenger, 0 Futures
- Highest ranking: No. 5 (16 April 1990)

Grand Slam doubles results
- Australian Open: F (1989)
- French Open: SF (1992)
- Wimbledon: QF (1987, 1989, 1992)
- US Open: QF (1989)

Other doubles tournaments
- Tour Finals: SF (1992)

Grand Slam mixed doubles results
- Australian Open: SF (1991)
- French Open: QF (1992)
- Wimbledon: F (1989)
- US Open: QF (1993)

Mark Edward Kratzmann (born 17 May 1966) is a former Australian professional tennis player.

== Tennis career ==
Kratzmann was an Australian Institute of Sport scholarship holder in 1983.

=== Juniors ===
As the world's No. 1 ranked junior player in 1984, Kratzmann won the boys' singles tournaments at the Australian Open, Wimbledon and the US Open that year.

=== Pro tour ===
As a professional player, Kratzmann won 18 doubles titles, including the Cincinnati Masters in 1990 (also reaching the Australian Open men's doubles final in 1989).

His best Grand Slam performance in singles was reaching the fourth round of the 1987 Australian Open. Kratzmann achieved a career-high singles ranking of world No. 50 in March 1990.

He sometimes partnered his brother Andrew in doubles matches.

== Cricket ==
Kratzmann began to play cricket after moving to Hong Kong in 2003, where he originally worked as a tennis coach. He won the Hong Kong Cricket Association's Player of the Year award for 2005–06. In May 2007, he was selected in the national squad to participate in the ICC World Cricket League Division Three tournament. He was also in the 20-man list for the Asia Cup but was not included in the final 14. He has made three international appearances for Hong Kong.

== ATP career finals ==
=== Doubles: 30 (18 titles, 12 runner-ups) ===
Legend Grand Slam tournaments (0–1) ATP World Tour Finals (0–0) ATP Masters Series (2–4) ATP Championship Series (3–0) ATP World Series (13–7)	Finals by surface Hard (13–8) Clay (0–2) Grass (3–1) Carpet (2–1)	Finals by setting Outdoor (10–9) Indoor (8–3)

Result	W–L	Date	Tournament	Tier	Surface	Partner	Opponents	Score
Loss	0–1	Jun 1986	Queen's Club, United Kingdom	Grand Prix	Grass	(Australia) Darren Cahill	(United States) Kevin Curren (France) Guy Forget	2–6, 6–7
Win	1–1	Aug 1986	Cincinnati Masters, United States	Masters Series	Hard	(Australia) Kim Warwick	(South Africa) Christo Steyn (South Africa) Danie Visser	6–3, 6–4
Loss	1–2	Nov 1986	Hong Kong	Grand Prix	Hard	(Australia) Pat Cash	(United States) Mike De Palmer (United States) Gary Donnelly	6–7, 7–6, 5–7
Win	2–2	Oct 1987	Sydney, Australia	Grand Prix	Hard	(Australia) Darren Cahill	(West Germany) Boris Becker (United States) Robert Seguso	6–3, 6–2
Win	3–2	Nov 1987	Hong Kong	Grand Prix	Hard	(United States) Jim Pugh	(United States) Martin Davis (Australia) Brad Drewett	6–7, 6–4, 6–2
Win	4–2	Jan 1988	Adelaide, Australia	Grand Prix	Hard	(Australia) Darren Cahill	(Australia) Carl Limberger (Australia) Mark Woodforde	4–6, 6–2, 7–5
Win	5–2	Jan 1988	Sydney, Australia	Grand Prix	Hard	(Australia) Darren Cahill	(United States) Bud Schultz (United States) Joey Rive	7–6, 6–4
Loss	5–3	Jan 1989	Adelaide, Australia	Grand Prix	Hard	(United States) Glenn Layendecker	(United Kingdom) Neil Broad (South Africa) Stefan Kruger	2–6, 6–7
Loss	5–4	Jan 1989	Melbourne, Australia	Grand Slam	Hard	(Australia) Darren Cahill	(United States) Jim Pugh (United States) Rick Leach	4–6, 4–6, 4–6
Win	6–4	Jun 1989	Queen's, United Kingdom	Grand Prix	Grass	(Australia) Darren Cahill	(United States) Tim Pawsat (Australia) Laurie Warder	7–6, 6–3
Win	7–4	Aug 1989	Stratton Mountain, United States	Grand Prix	Hard	(Australia) Wally Masur	(South Africa) Pieter Aldrich (South Africa) Danie Visser	6–3, 4–6, 7–6
Win	8–4	Oct 1989	Brisbane, Australia	Grand Prix	Hard	(Australia) Darren Cahill	(Australia) Broderick Dyke (Australia) Simon Youl	6–4, 5–7, 6–0
Loss	8–5	Oct 1989	Sydney, Australia	Grand Prix	Hard	(Australia) Darren Cahill	(United States) David Pate (United States) Scott Warner	3–6, 7–6, 5–7
Win	9–5	Jan 1990	Sydney International, Australia	World Series	Hard	(Australia) Pat Cash	(South Africa) Pieter Aldrich (South Africa) Danie Visser	6–4, 7–5
Win	10–5	Mar 1990	Memphis, United States	World Series	Hard	(Australia) Darren Cahill	(Germany) Udo Riglewski (Germany) Michael Stich	7–5, 6–2
Win	11–5	Apr 1990	Japan Open	Championship Series	Hard	(Australia) Wally Masur	(United States) Kent Kinnear (United States) Brad Pearce	3–6, 6–3, 6–4
Win	12–5	May 1990	Singapore	World Series	Hard	(Australia) Jason Stoltenberg	(Australia) Todd Woodbridge (Australia) Brad Drewett	6–1, 6–0
Win	13–5	Jun 1990	Manchester, United Kingdom	World Series	Grass	(Australia) Jason Stoltenberg	(United Kingdom) Nick Brown (United States) Kelly Jones	6–3, 2–6, 6–4
Win	14–5	Jul 1990	Newport, United States	World Series	Grass	(Australia) Darren Cahill	(United States) Todd Nelson (United States) Bryan Shelton	7–6, 6–2
Win	15–5	Jul 1990	Cincinnati Masters, United States	Masters Series	Hard	(Australia) Darren Cahill	(United Kingdom) Neil Broad (South Africa) Gary Muller	7–6, 6–2
Loss	15–6	Nov 1990	Paris Masters, France	Masters Series	Carpet	(Australia) Darren Cahill	(United States) Scott Davis (United States) David Pate	7–5, 3–6, 4–6
Loss	15–7	Jan 1991	Sydney International, Australia	World Series	Hard	(Australia) Darren Cahill	(United States) Scott Davis (United States) David Pate	6–3, 3–6, 2–6
Loss	15–8	Jan 1992	Adelaide, Australia	World Series	Hard	(Australia) Jason Stoltenberg	(Croatia) Goran Ivanisevic (Switzerland) Marc Rosset	6–7, 6–7
Loss	15–9	May 1992	Italian Open	Masters Series	Clay	(South Africa) Wayne Ferreira	(Switzerland) Jakob Hlasek (Switzerland) Marc Rosset	4–6, 6–3, 1–6
Win	16–9	Feb 1993	Milan, Italy	Championship Series	Carpet	(Australia) Wally Masur	(Netherlands) Tom Nijssen (Czech Republic) Cyril Suk	4–6, 6–3, 6–4
Win	17–9	Feb 1993	Stuttgart, Germany	Championship Series	Carpet	(Australia) Wally Masur	(United States) Steve Devries (Australia) David Macpherson	6–3, 7–6
Loss	17–10	May 1993	Italian Open	Masters Series	Clay	(South Africa) Wayne Ferreira	(Netherlands) Jacco Eltingh (Netherlands) Paul Haarhuis	4–6, 6–7
Win	18–10	Jan 1994	Adelaide, Australia	World Series	Hard	(Australia) Andrew Kratzmann	(South Africa) David Adams (Zimbabwe) Byron Black	6–4, 6–3
Loss	18–11	Jan 1994	Sydney, Australia	World Series	Hard	(Australia) Laurie Warder	(Australia) Darren Cahill (Australia) Sandon Stolle	1–6, 6–7
Loss	18–12	Aug 1994	Cincinnati Masters, United States	Masters Series	Hard	(South Africa) Wayne Ferreira	(United States) Alex O'Brien (Australia) Sandon Stolle	7–6, 3–6, 2–6

== ATP Challenger and ITF Futures finals ==
=== Singles: 1 (0–1) ===
Legend ATP Challenger (0–1) ITF Futures (0–0)	Finals by surface Hard (0–0) Clay (0–0) Grass (0–0) Carpet (0–1)

Result	W–L	Date	Tournament	Tier	Surface	Opponent	Score
Loss	0–1	Nov 1989	Hobart, Australia	Challenger	Carpet	(Australia) Todd Woodbridge	3–6, 6–1, 2–6

=== Doubles: 1 (0–1) ===
Legend ATP Challenger (0–1) ITF Futures (0–0)	Finals by surface Hard (0–1) Clay (0–0) Grass (0–0) Carpet (0–0)

Result	W–L	Date	Tournament	Tier	Surface	Partner	Opponents	Score
Loss	0–1	Apr 1991	Taipei, Taiwan	Challenger	Hard	(Australia) Jason Stoltenberg	(United States) Kelly Jones (Australia) Todd Woodbridge	6–7, 3–6

== Junior Grand Slam finals ==
=== Singles: 5 (4 titles, 1 runner-up) ===
Result	Year	Championship	Surface	Opponent	Score
Win	1982	Australian Open	Hard	(Australia) Simon Youl	6–3, 7–5
Loss	1984	French Open	Clay	(Sweden) Kent Carlsson	3–6, 3–6
Win	1984	Wimbledon	Grass	(South Africa) Stefan Kruger	6–4, 4–6, 6–3
Win	1984	US Open	Hard	(Germany) Boris Becker	6–3, 7–6
Win	1984	Australian Open	Hard	(Australia) Patrick Flynn	6–4, 6–1

=== Doubles: 5 (4 titles, 1 runner-up) ===
Result	Year	Championship	Surface	Partnet	Opponents	Score
Win	1983	French Open	Clay	(Australia) Simon Youl	(Romania) Mihnea Nastase (Finland) Olli Rahnasto	6–4, 6–4
Win	1983	Wimbledon	Grass	(Australia) Simon Youl	(Romania) Mihnea Nastase (Finland) Olli Rahnasto	6–4, 6–4
Win	1983	US Open	Hard	(Australia) Simon Youl	(United States) Patrick McEnroe (United States) Brad Pearce	6–1, 7–6
Loss	1984	Wimbledon	Grass	(Sweden) Jonas Svensson	(United States) Ricky Brown (United States) Robbie Weiss	6–1, 4–6, 9–11
Win	1984	Australian Open	Hard	(Australia) Mike Baroch	(Australia) Brett Custer (Australia) David Macpherson	6–2, 5–7, 7–5

== Performance timelines ==
Key
W	F	SF	QF	#R	RR	Q#	DNQ	A	NH

(W) winner; (F) finalist; (SF) semifinalist; (QF) quarterfinalist; (#R) rounds 4, 3, 2, 1; (RR) round-robin stage; (Q#) qualification round; (DNQ) did not qualify; (A) absent; (NH) not held; (SR) strike rate (events won / competed); (W–L) win–loss record.

=== Singles ===
Tournament	1982	1983	1984	1985	1986	1987	1988	1989	1990	1991	1992	1993	1994	SR	W–L	Win %
Grand Slam tournaments
Australian Open	1R	2R	1R	Q3	A	4R	3R	2R	1R	1R	Q2	Q2	A	0 / 8	7–8	47%
French Open	A	A	1R	A	1R	1R	A	1R	1R	A	A	A	A	0 / 5	0–5	0%
Wimbledon	A	Q1	2R	Q2	3R	Q3	A	2R	3R	1R	Q1	Q1	A	0 / 5	6–5	55%
US Open	A	A	A	A	1R	A	A	1R	2R	A	A	A	A	0 / 3	1–3	25%
Win–loss	0–1	1–1	1–3	0–0	2–3	3–2	2–1	2–4	3–4	0–2	0–0	0–0	0–0	0 / 21	14–21	0%
ATP Masters Series
Miami	A	A	A	A	A	A	A	A	4R	1R	A	A	A	0 / 2	3–2	60%
Canada	A	A	A	A	A	A	A	A	2R	A	Q3	Q1	A	0 / 1	1–1	50%
Cincinnati	A	A	A	A	A	A	A	A	1R	A	Q2	A	Q1	0 / 1	0–1	0%
Win–loss	0–0	0–0	0–0	0–0	0–0	0–0	0–0	0–0	4–3	0–1	0–0	0–0	0–0	0 / 4	4–4	50%

=== Doubles ===
Tournament	1982	1983	1984	1985	1986	1987	1988	1989	1990	1991	1992	1993	1994	1995	SR	W–L	Win %
Grand Slam tournaments
Australian Open	1R	2R	2R	1R	A	QF	3R	F	QF	3R	2R	SF	3R	2R	0 / 13	24–13	65%
French Open	A	A	2R	2R	2R	3R	A	1R	1R	2R	SF	QF	2R	A	0 / 10	14–10	58%
Wimbledon	A	Q2	1R	1R	2R	QF	A	QF	1R	3R	QF	2R	1R	A	0 / 10	13–10	57%
US Open	A	A	1R	A	1R	1R	A	QF	1R	1R	2R	2R	1R	A	0 / 9	5–9	36%
Win–loss	0–1	1–1	2–4	1–3	2–3	7–4	2–1	11–4	3–4	5–4	9–4	9–4	3–4	1–1	0 / 42	56–42	57%
Year-end championships
Tennis Masters Cup	A	A	A	A	A	A	A	A	RR	A	SF	RR	A	A	0 / 3	3–7	30%
ATP Masters Series
Indian Wells	A	A	A	A	A	A	2R	1R	2R	2R	1R	SF	2R	A	0 / 7	5–7	42%
Miami	A	A	A	A	A	A	2R	QF	SF	3R	QF	3R	A	A	0 / 6	12–6	67%
Monte Carlo	A	A	A	1R	2R	1R	A	A	A	A	A	A	1R	A	0 / 4	1–4	20%
Hamburg	A	A	A	A	A	2R	A	A	A	A	A	A	A	A	0 / 1	1–1	50%
Rome	A	A	A	A	2R	A	A	A	A	A	F	F	A	A	0 / 3	9–3	75%
Canada	A	A	A	A	A	A	A	A	1R	A	SF	QF	A	A	0 / 3	4–3	57%
Cincinnati	A	A	A	A	W	QF	A	2R	W	2R	1R	2R	F	A	2 / 8	18–6	75%
Paris	A	A	A	A	A	A	A	A	F	1R	QF	2R	1R	A	0 / 5	4–5	44%
Win–loss	0–0	0–0	0–0	0–1	7–2	3–3	2–2	4–3	12–4	2–4	10–6	9–6	5–4	0–0	2 / 37	54–35	61%
Year-end ranking	409	289	130	164	35	43	124	13	7	62	14	13	43	721	Prize money: $1,378,936		

=== Mixed doubles ===
Tournament	1984	1985	1986	1987	1988	1989	1990	1991	1992	1993	1994	1995	SR	W–L	Win %
Grand Slam tournaments
Australian Open	A	A	A	2R	1R	1R	2R	SF	QF	1R	A	1R	0 / 8	7–8	47%
French Open	3R	A	2R	A	A	A	A	A	QF	A	1R	A	0 / 4	5–4	56%
Wimbledon	1R	1R	A	1R	A	F	1R	2R	2R	SF	1R	A	0 / 9	11–9	55%
US Open	1R	A	1R	A	A	1R	A	1R	1R	QF	A	A	0 / 6	2–6	25%
Win–loss	2–3	0–1	1–2	1–2	0–1	5–3	1–2	4–3	5–4	6–3	0–2	0–1	0 / 27	25–27	48%
