= Darren Cahill =

Australian tennis player and coach (born 1965)

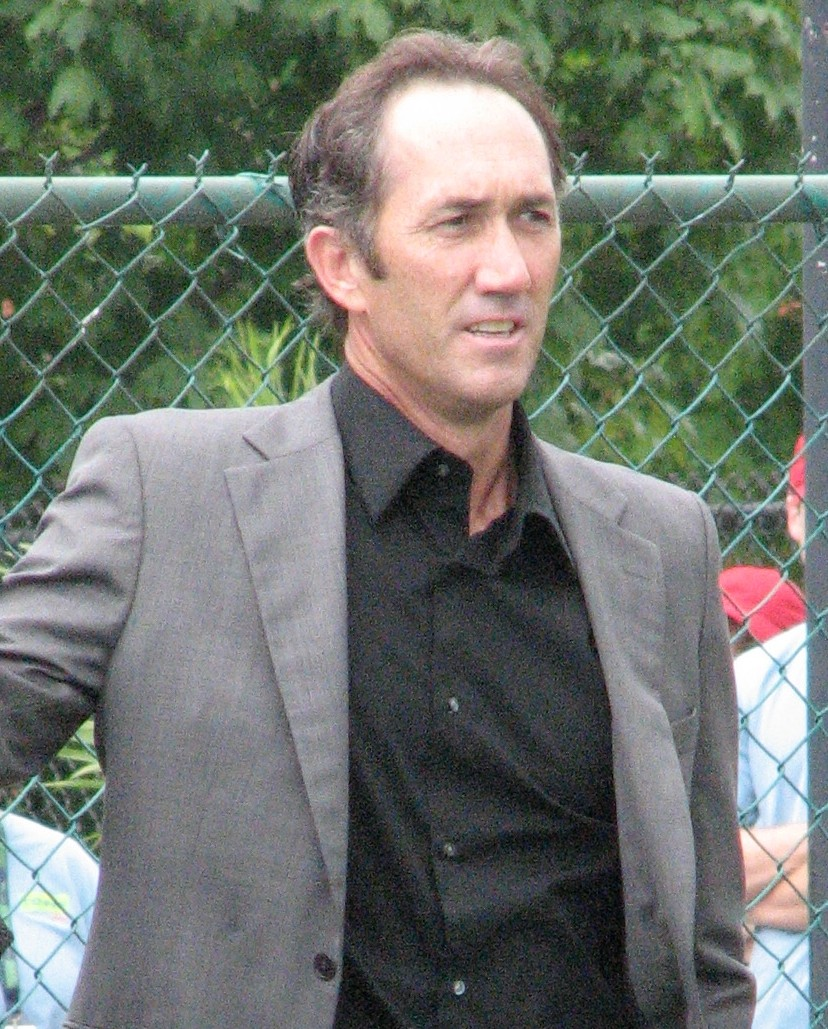
- Country (sports): Australia
- Residence: Adelaide, Australia
- Born: 2 October 1965 (age 61) Adelaide, Australia
- Height: 1.85 m (6 ft 1 in)
- Turned pro: 1984
- Retired: 1995
- Plays: Right-handed (one-handed backhand)
- Prize money: US$ 1,349,247

Singles
- Career record: 133–122
- Career titles: 2
- Highest ranking: No. 22 (24 April 1989)

Grand Slam singles results
- Australian Open: 3R (1985, 1989, 1991)
- French Open: 3R (1985, 1987, 1989)
- Wimbledon: 2R (1988, 1990, 1994)
- US Open: SF (1988)

Other tournaments
- Olympic Games: 2R (1988)

Doubles
- Career record: 192–138
- Career titles: 13
- Highest ranking: No. 10 (7 August 1989)

Grand Slam doubles results
- Australian Open: F (1989)
- French Open: 3R (1987, 1988)
- Wimbledon: QF (1987, 1989)
- US Open: QF (1989)

Other doubles tournaments
- Tour Finals: RR (1990)
- Olympic Games: QF (1988)

Grand Slam mixed doubles results
- Australian Open: 2R (1988, 1995)
- French Open: QF (1989)
- Wimbledon: F (1987)
- US Open: QF (1986)

Coaching career
- Andre Agassi; Lleyton Hewitt; Simona Halep; Jannik Sinner

Coaching achievements
- List of notable tournaments (with champion): 2026 Wimbledon (Jannik Sinner); 2025 Wimbledon (Jannik Sinner); 2025 Australian Open (Sinner); 2024 US Open (Sinner); 2024 Australian Open (Sinner); 2018 French Open (Halep); 2003 Australian Open (Agassi); 2001 US Open (Hewitt)

Coaching awards and records
- Awards 2023 ATP Coach of the Year
- Last updated on: 1 January 2026.

Darren Cahill (born 2 October 1965) is an Australian tennis coach and former professional tennis player. In addition, Cahill is a tennis analyst for the Grand Slam events on the US sports network ESPN and a coach with the Adidas Player Development Program and at ProTennisCoach.com.

== Early life and education ==
Cahill is the son of Australian rules football player and coach John Cahill. After high school he attended the Australian Institute of Sport on a scholarship.

== Career ==
=== Player ===
Cahill turned professional in 1984. He won his first tour doubles title in 1985 at the Melbourne Outdoor tournament. In 1987, he won his first top-level singles title at New Haven.

Cahill's best singles performance at a Grand Slam event came at the 1988 US Open, where he knocked out Lawson Duncan, Boris Becker, Marcelo Ingaramo (a walkover after Ingaramo withdrew), Martin Laurendeau, and Aaron Krickstein on the way to reaching the semifinals, where he lost to eventual champion Mats Wilander.

In 1989, Cahill finished runner-up in men's doubles at the Australian Open partnering fellow Aussie Mark Kratzmann. Also with Kratzmann, Cahill won the ATP Championships in Cincinnati.

Cahill was a member of the Australian team which reached the final of the Davis Cup in 1990. The team lost 3–2 to the United States in the final. Cahill compiled a 6–4 career Davis Cup record (4–0 in doubles and 2–4 in singles).

Cahill won his last tour singles title in 1991 at San Francisco. His last doubles title came in 1994 in Sydney.

In 1989, Cahill's reached his career peak doubles ranking of world No. 10 and his peak singles ranking of no. 22 in 1989. After chronic knee injuries and ten operations, he retired from the professional tour in 1995.

=== Coach ===
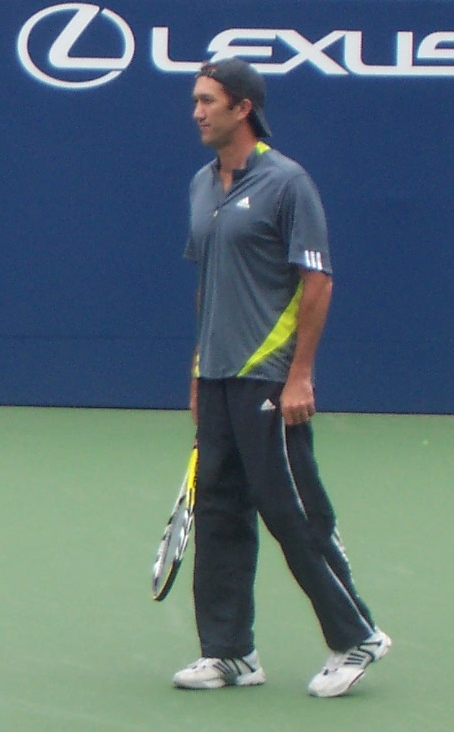
Cahill coaching in 2007

Since retiring from the tour, Cahill has been a successful tennis coach and guided Lleyton Hewitt to become the second youngest player ever ranked world No. 1. After Hewitt, Cahill coached Andre Agassi, who under Cahill became the oldest player ever to be ranked world no. 1 in May 2003 (later surpassed by multiple players). Cahill joined the Adidas Player Development Program after Agassi retired in 2006 and has worked with high-profile players, including Andy Murray, Ana Ivanovic, Fernando Verdasco, Daniela Hantuchová, Sorana Cîrstea, and Simona Halep. In 2017 and 2018, he coached Halep to No.1 on the WTA Tour and the 2018 French Open championship. After a year away, Cahill rejoined with Halep in 2020.

In addition to coaching individual players, Cahill was the Australian Davis Cup coach from 2007 until February 2009. He is also an Adidas talent scout and works with promising junior players worldwide. He is now a member of the Adidas Player Development Program. With Roger Rasheed, Brad Gilbert, and Paul Annacone, Cahill is a coach at ProTennisCoach.com, an open-access, professional coaching website. Cahill is also involved with PlaySight Interactive, a sports technology company behind the SmartCourt. Along with Paul Annacone, he heads up PlaySight's Coaching and Player Development team, helping the company to bring its technology to more tennis coaches and players across the world.

In January 2022, Cahill began coaching tennis player Amanda Anisimova as a trial coach. He joined Simone Vagnozzi as a coach for Jannik Sinner in July 2022. The pair received the Coach of the Year award at the 2023 ATP Awards.

Cahill coached Sinner to win the 2024 Australian Open and US Open, the 2025 Australian Open and Wimbledon, and the 2026 Wimbledon.

=== Media ===
Since 2007, Cahill is a tennis analyst for the global sports network ESPN for three of the four major tennis Grand Slams: the Australian Open, Wimbledon and the US Open. He also works for the Australian television network Channel 7 for the Hopman Cup and Australian Open.

== Personal life ==
Cahill and his wife Victoria married in 2000. They have two children, Benjamin and Tahlia.

Cahill's nickname is "Killer".

== ATP career finals ==
=== Singles: 3 (2 titles / 1 runner-up) ===
Legend Grand Slam Tournaments (0–0) ATP World Tour Finals (0–0) ATP Masters 1000 Series (0–0) ATP 500 Series (0–0) ATP 250 Series (2–1)	Finals by surface Hard (0–0) Clay (1–0) Grass (0–1) Carpet (1–0)	Finals by setting Outdoors (1–1) Indoors (1–0)

Result	W–L	Date	Tournament	Tier	Surface	Opponent	Score
Win	1–0	Jul 1988	Gstaad, Switzerland	Grand Prix	Clay	(Switzerland) Jakob Hlasek	6–3, 6–4, 7–6^{(7–2)}
Loss	1–1	Jul 1990	Newport, United States	World Series	Grass	(South Africa) Pieter Aldrich	6–7^{(10–12)}, 6–1, 1–6
Win	2–1	Feb 1991	San Francisco, United States	World Series	Carpet	(United States) Brad Gilbert	6–2, 3–6, 6–4

=== Doubles: 20 (13 titles / 7 runner-ups) ===
Legend Grand Slam tournaments (0–1) ATP World Tour Masters Series (1–1) ATP World Series since 1990 (3–3) ATP International Series since 1990 (0–0)	Finals by surface Hard (8–4) Clay (0–1) Grass (5–1) Carpet (0–2)

Result	W-L	Date	Tournament	Surface	Partner	Opponents	Score
Win	1–0	Dec 1985	Melbourne, Australia	Grass	(Australia) Peter Carter	(United States) Brett Dickinson (Argentina) Roberto Saad	7–6^{(7–3)}, 6–1
Loss	1–1	Jun 1986	Queen's Club, London, England	Grass	(Australia) Mark Kratzmann	(United States) Kevin Curren (France) Guy Forget	2–6, 6–7
Loss	1–2	Jul 1987	Bordeaux, France	Clay	(Australia) Mark Woodforde	(Spain) Sergio Casal (Spain) Emilio Sánchez	3–6, 3–6
Win	2–2	Oct 1987	Sydney Indoor, Australia	Hard (i)	(Australia) Mark Kratzmann	(Germany) Boris Becker (United States) Robert Seguso	6–3, 6–2
Win	3–2	Dec 1987	Adelaide, Australia	Hard	(Australia) Mark Kratzmann	(Australia) Carl Limberger (Australia) Mark Woodforde	4–6, 6–2, 7–5
Win	4–2	Jan 1988	Sydney Outdoor, Australia	Grass	(Australia) Mark Kratzmann	(United States) Joey Rive (United States) Bud Schultz	7–6, 6–4
Win	5–2	Apr 1988	Hamburg, West Germany	Grass	(Australia) Laurie Warder	(United States) Rick Leach (United States) Jim Pugh	6–4, 6–4
Win	6–2	Oct 1988	Sydney Indoor, Australia	Hard (i)	(Australia) John Fitzgerald	(United States) Marty Davis (Australia) Brad Drewett	6–3, 6–2
Win	7–2	Jan 1989	Sydney Outdoor, Australia	Hard	(Australia) Wally Masur	(South Africa) Pieter Aldrich (South Africa) Danie Visser	6–4, 6–3
Loss	7–3	Jan 1989	Australian Open, Melbourne	Hard	(Australia) Mark Kratzmann	(United States) Rick Leach (United States) Jim Pugh	4–6, 4–6, 4–6
Win	8–3	Jun 1989	Queen's Club, London, England	Grass	(Australia) Mark Kratzmann	(United States) Tim Pawsat (Australia) Laurie Warder	7–6, 6–3
Win	9–3	Oct 1989	Brisbane, Australia	Hard	(Australia) Mark Kratzmann	(Australia) Broderick Dyke (Australia) Simon Youl	6–4, 5–7, 6–0
Loss	9–4	Oct 1989	Sydney Indoor, Australia	Hard (i)	(Australia) Mark Kratzmann	(United States) Scott Warner (United States) David Pate	3–6, 7–6, 5–7
Win	10–4	Feb 1990	Memphis, Tennessee	Hard (i)	(Australia) Mark Kratzmann	(Germany) Udo Riglewski (Germany) Michael Stich	7–5, 6–2
Win	11–4	Jul 1990	Newport, Rhode Island	Grass	(Australia) Mark Kratzmann	(United States) Todd Nelson (United States) Bryan Shelton	7–6, 6–2
Win	12–4	Aug 1990	Cincinnati, Ohio	Hard	(Australia) Mark Kratzmann	(United Kingdom) Neil Broad (South Africa) Gary Muller	7–6, 6–2
Loss	12–5	Oct 1990	Paris, France	Carpet	(Australia) Mark Kratzmann	(United States) Scott Davis (United States) David Pate	7–5, 3–6, 4–6
Loss	12–6	Jan 1991	Sydney Outdoor, Australia	Hard	(Australia) Mark Kratzmann	(United States) Scott Davis (United States) David Pate	6–3, 3–6, 2–6
Win	13–6	Jan 1994	Sydney Outdoor, Australia	Hard	(Australia) Sandon Stolle	(Australia) Mark Kratzmann (Australia) Laurie Warder	6–1, 7–6
Loss	13–7	Jan 1994	Dubai, United Arab Republic	Hard	(Australia) John Fitzgerald	(Australia) Todd Woodbridge (Australia) Mark Woodforde	7–6, 4–6, 2–6

=== Mixed doubles: 1 (0–1) ===
Result	Year	Championship	Surface	Partner	Opponent	Score
Loss	1987	Wimbledon	Grass	(Australia) Nicole Provis	(United Kingdom) Jo Durie (United Kingdom) Jeremy Bates	6–7^{(10–12)}, 3–6

== Performance timelines ==
Key
W	F	SF	QF	#R	RR	Q#	DNQ	A	NH

(W) winner; (F) finalist; (SF) semifinalist; (QF) quarterfinalist; (#R) rounds 4, 3, 2, 1; (RR) round-robin stage; (Q#) qualification round; (DNQ) did not qualify; (A) absent; (NH) not held; (SR) strike rate (events won / competed); (W–L) win–loss record.

=== Singles ===
Tournament	1983	1984	1985	1986	1987	1988	1989	1990	1991	1992	1993	1994	SR	W–L	Win %
Grand Slam tournaments
Australian Open	Q3	2R	3R	A	1R	2R	3R	1R	3R	A	A	1R	0 / 8	8–8	50%
French Open	A	A	3R	2R	3R	1R	3R	1R	A	A	A	1R	0 / 7	7–7	50%
Wimbledon	A	A	Q2	1R	Q2	2R	1R	2R	A	A	A	2R	0 / 5	3–5	38%
US Open	A	A	A	1R	2R	SF	2R	4R	A	A	A	A	0 / 5	10–5	67%
Win–loss	0–0	1–1	4–2	1–3	3–3	7–4	5–4	4–4	2–1	0–0	0–0	1–3	0 / 25	28–25	53%
National Representation
Summer Olympics	NH	A	Not Held			2R	Not Held			A	NH		0 / 1	1–1	50%
ATP Masters Series
Indian Wells	A	A	A	A	A	3R	2R	3R	3R	A	A	QF	0 / 5	10–5	67%
Miami	A	A	A	A	3R	2R	3R	1R	3R	A	A	A	0 / 5	6–5	55%
Monte Carlo	A	A	A	A	A	1R	A	A	A	A	A	A	0 / 1	0–1	0%
Hamburg	A	A	A	A	2R	3R	1R	A	A	A	A	Q1	0 / 3	3–3	50%
Rome	A	A	A	A	A	A	3R	A	A	A	A	Q3	0 / 1	2–1	67%
Canada	A	A	A	A	A	A	A	3R	A	A	A	A	0 / 1	2–1	67%
Cincinnati	A	A	A	A	A	1R	A	3R	A	A	A	A	0 / 2	2–2	50%
Paris	A	A	A	A	A	1R	A	A	A	A	A	A	0 / 1	0–1	0%
Win–loss	0–0	0–0	0–0	0–0	3–2	5–6	5–4	6–4	3–2	0–0	0–0	3–1	0 / 19	25–19	57%

=== Doubles ===
Tournament	1982	1983	1984	1985	1986	1987	1988	1989	1990	1991	1992	1993	1994	1995	SR	W–L	Win %
Grand Slam tournaments
Australian Open	A	A	1R	2R	A	QF	3R	F	QF	3R	A	A	1R	1R	0 / 9	15–9	63%
French Open	A	A	A	1R	2R	3R	3R	1R	1R	2R	A	A	2R	A	0 / 8	7–8	47%
Wimbledon	A	A	A	1R	2R	QF	2R	QF	1R	A	A	A	1R	A	0 / 7	8–7	53%
US Open	A	A	A	A	1R	1R	3R	QF	1R	A	A	A	2R	A	0 / 6	6–6	50%
Win–loss	0–0	0–0	0–1	1–3	2–3	7–4	7–4	11–4	3–4	3–2	0–0	0–0	2–4	0–1	0 / 30	36–30	55%
National Representation
Summer Olympics	NH		A	Not Held			QF	Not Held			A	Not Held			0 / 1	2–1	67%
Year-end Championships
ATP Finals	Did not qualify								RR	Did not qualify					0 / 1	0–3	0%
ATP Masters Series
Indian Wells	A	A	A	A	A	1R	2R	1R	2R	2R	A	A	SF	A	0 / 6	5–6	45%
Miami	A	A	A	A	A	1R	2R	QF	SF	3R	A	A	A	A	0 / 5	8–5	62%
Monte Carlo	A	A	A	A	A	1R	2R	A	A	A	A	A	A	A	0 / 2	0–2	0%
Hamburg	A	A	A	A	A	2R	W	A	A	A	A	A	2R	A	1 / 3	6–2	75%
Rome	A	A	A	1R	2R	A	A	1R	A	A	A	A	1R	A	0 / 4	1–4	20%
Canada	QF	A	A	A	A	A	A	A	1R	A	A	A	A	A	0 / 2	2–2	50%
Cincinnati	1R	A	A	A	A	QF	SF	A	W	A	A	A	2R	A	1 / 5	11–4	73%
Paris	A	A	A	A	A	A	SF	A	F	A	A	A	A	A	0 / 2	5–2	71%
Win–loss	2–2	0–0	0–0	0–1	1–1	3–5	15–5	3–3	12–4	1–2	0–0	0–0	5–4	0–0	2 / 29	42–27	61%

=== Mixed doubles ===
Tournament	1986	1987	1988	1989	1990	1991	1992	1993	1994	1995	SR	W–L	Win %
Grand Slam tournaments
Australian Open	A	A	2R	A	1R	A	A	A	1R	2R	0 / 4	2–4	33%
French Open	A	2R	3R	QF	A	A	A	A	A	A	0 / 3	5–3	63%
Wimbledon	2R	F	QF	QF	3R	A	A	A	A	A	0 / 5	14–5	74%
US Open	QF	A	1R	1R	A	A	A	A	A	A	0 / 3	2–3	40%
Win–loss	3–2	6–2	6–4	5–3	2–2	0–0	0–0	0–0	0–1	1–1	0 / 15	23–15	61%

Awards and achievements
Preceded by (Spain) Juan Carlos Ferrero	ATP Coach of the Year; 2023 (with (Italy) Simone Vagnozzi)	Succeeded by (United States) Michael Russell
