= Slobodan Živojinović =

Serbian tennis player

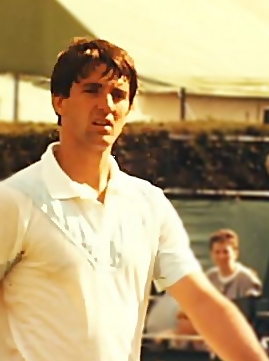
- Živojinović at Wimbledon in the mid 1980s
- Country (sports): Yugoslavia
- Residence: Belgrade, Serbia
- Born: 23 July 1963 (age 62) Belgrade, SR Serbia, SFR Yugoslavia
- Height: 1.98 m (6 ft 6 in)
- Turned pro: 1981
- Retired: 1992
- Plays: Right-handed (one-handed backhand)
- Prize money: US $1,450,654

Singles
- Career record: 151–139 (52.07%)
- Career titles: 2
- Highest ranking: No. 19 (26 October 1987)

Grand Slam singles results
- Australian Open: SF (1985)
- French Open: 3R (1988)
- Wimbledon: SF (1986)
- US Open: 3R (1987)

Doubles
- Career record: 152–102 (59.84%)
- Career titles: 8
- Highest ranking: No. 1 (8 September 1986)

Grand Slam doubles results
- Australian Open: QF (1985)
- French Open: 1R (1985, 1989, 1991)
- Wimbledon: SF (1987)
- US Open: W (1986)

Team competitions
- Davis Cup: 36–26 (Sin. 24–15, Dbs. 12–11)

Slobodan "Boba" Živojinović (Serbian Cyrillic: Слободан Живојиновић, pronounced [slɔbɔ̌dan ʒiʋɔjǐːnɔʋit͡ɕ]; born 23 July 1963) is a Serbian former professional tennis player who competed for SFR Yugoslavia.

Together with Nenad Zimonjić, he is the only tennis player from Serbia to be the world No. 1 in doubles. As a singles player, he reached the semifinals of the 1985 Australian Open and the 1986 Wimbledon Championships, achieving a career-high ranking of world No. 19 in October 1987.

== Tennis career ==
Živojinović represented SFR Yugoslavia as the number 15 seed at the 1988 Summer Olympics in Seoul, where he was defeated in the second round by France's Guy Forget.

The right-hander won two career singles titles (Houston, 1986 and Sydney, 1988), as well as eight doubles titles. He reached his highest singles ATP ranking on 26 October 1987, when he became world No. 19. Živojinović was known for his size that made him the original big-boom server before Goran Ivanisevic. He built his game on his big serve, enhanced greatly by his height and his muscular thighs. He was an exciting player to watch and a very troubling one to play against. His ace total in a match often became difficult to overcome and players did not look forward to competing against him.

Živojinović's most notable Grand Slam results were two semifinals. As an unseeded player at the 1985 Australian Open, he memorably beat John McEnroe in a five-set quarterfinal to reach the semifinals (where he lost in straight sets to Mats Wilander). The next year, at the 1986 Wimbledon semifinal, again as an unseeded player, he lost to Ivan Lendl in a five-set match.

Over the course of his career, Živojinović amassed an overall singles record of 152 wins and 139 defeats. He was much more successful in doubles competition, winning the US Open in 1986 with Andrés Gómez. The same year, he won three more tournaments. He was ranked as the world No. 1 doubles player on 8 September 1986.

== Career finals ==
=== Singles: 4 (2 titles, 2 runner-ups) ===
Legend Grand Slam (0–0) Tennis Masters Cup (0–0) ATP Tour (2–2)	Titles by surface Hard (1–0) Clay (0–1) Grass (0–0) Carpet (1–1)	Titles by setting Outdoors (0–1) Indoors (2–1)

Result	W/L	Date	Tournament	Surface	Opponent	Score
Loss	0–1	Mar 1985	Nancy, France	Carpet (i)	(United States) Tim Wilkison	6–4, 6–7^{(5–7)}, 7–9
Win	1–1	Nov 1986	Houston, United States	Carpet (i)	(United States) Scott Davis	6–1, 4–6, 6–3
Loss	1–2	May 1988	Forest Hills, United States	Clay	(United States) Andre Agassi	5–7, 6–7^{(2–7)}, 5–7
Win	2–2	Oct 1988	Sydney, Australia	Hard (i)	(United States) Richard Matuszewski	7–6^{(10–8)}, 6–3, 6–4

=== Doubles: 14 (8 titles, 6 runner-ups) ===
Legend Grand Slam (1–0) Tennis Masters Cup (0–0) ATP Tour (7–6)	Titles by surface Hard (2–2) Clay (0–1) Grass (0–0) Carpet (6–3)	Titles by setting Outdoors (2–3) Indoors (6–3)

Result	W/L	Date	Tournament	Surface	Partner	Opponents	Score
Win	1–0	Jul 1985	Boston, United States	Hard	(Belgium) Libor Pimek	(Australia) Peter McNamara (Australia) Paul McNamee	2–6, 6–4, 7–6
Loss	1–1	Nov 1985	Wembley, UK	Carpet (i)	(Germany) Boris Becker	(France) Guy Forget (Sweden) Anders Järryd	5–7, 6–4, 5–7
Win	2–1	Mar 1986	Brussels, Belgium	Carpet (i)	(West Germany) Boris Becker	(Australia) John Fitzgerald (Czechoslovakia) Tomáš Šmíd	7–6, 7–5
Win	3–1	Mar 1986	Rotterdam, Netherlands	Carpet (i)	(Sweden) Stefan Edberg	(Poland) Wojciech Fibak (United States) Matt Mitchell	2–6, 6–3, 6–2
Loss	3–2	May 1986	Forest Hills, US	Clay	(Germany) Boris Becker	(Chile) Hans Gildemeister (Ecuador) Andrés Gómez	6–7, 6–7
Loss	3–3	Aug 1986	Toronto, Canada	Hard	(Germany) Boris Becker	(United States) Chip Hooper (United States) Mike Leach	7–6, 3–6, 3–6
Win	4–3	Aug 1986	US Open, New York	Hard	(Ecuador) Andrés Gómez	(Sweden) Joakim Nyström (Sweden) Mats Wilander	4–6, 6–3, 6–3, 4–6, 6–3
Loss	4–4	Oct 1986	Vienna, Austria	Carpet (i)	(United States) Brad Gilbert	(Brazil) Ricardo Acioly (Poland) Wojciech Fibak	walkover
Loss	4–5	Nov 1986	Stockholm, Sweden	Hard	(Australia) Pat Cash	(United States) Sherwood Stewart (United States) Kim Warwick	4–6, 4–6
Win	5–5	Mar 1987	Brussels, Belgium	Carpet (i)	(West Germany) Boris Becker	(United States) Chip Hooper (United States) Michael Leach	7–6, 7–6
Win	6–5	Mar 1987	Milan, Italy	Carpet (i)	(West Germany) Boris Becker	(Spain) Sergio Casal (Spain) Emilio Sánchez	3–6, 6–3, 6–4
Win	7–5	Oct 1988	Tokyo, Japan	Carpet (i)	(Ecuador) Andrés Gómez	(West Germany) Boris Becker (West Germany) Eric Jelen	7–5, 5–7, 6–3
Loss	7–6	Oct 1989	Tokyo, Japan	Carpet (i)	(Ecuador) Andrés Gómez	(United States) Kevin Curren (United States) David Pate	6–4, 3–6, 6–7
Win	8–6	Feb 1990	Brussels, Belgium	Carpet (i)	(Spain) Emilio Sánchez	(Socialist Federal Republic of Yugoslavia) Goran Ivanišević (Hungary) Balázs Taróczy	7–5, 6–3

=== Team competitions: 1 (1 title) ===
Result	Date	Team competition	Surface	Partner/Team	Opponents	Score
Win	May 1990	World Team Cup, Düsseldorf, Germany	Clay	(Socialist Federal Republic of Yugoslavia) Goran Ivanišević (Socialist Federal Republic of Yugoslavia) Goran Prpić	(United States) Jim Courier (United States) Brad Gilbert (United States) Ken Flach (United States) Robert Seguso	2–1

== Grand Slam singles performance timeline ==
Key
W	F	SF	QF	#R	RR	Q#	DNQ	A	NH

(W) winner; (F) finalist; (SF) semifinalist; (QF) quarterfinalist; (#R) rounds 4, 3, 2, 1; (RR) round-robin stage; (Q#) qualification round; (DNQ) did not qualify; (A) absent; (NH) not held; (SR) strike rate (events won / competed); (W–L) win–loss record.

Tournament	1982	1983	1984	1985	1986	1987	1988	1989	1990	1991	Career SR
Australian Open	A	A	A	SF	NH	3R	3R	2R	1R	Q2	0 / 6
French Open	1R	A	2R	2R	1R	1R	3R	1R	1R	A	0 / 8
Wimbledon	A	A	A	2R	SF	QF	4R	4R	1R	1R	0 / 7
US Open	A	A	A	1R	1R	3R	1R	1R	A	A	0 / 5
Grand Slam SR	0 / 1	0 / 0	0 / 1	0 / 4	0 / 3	0 / 4	0 / 4	0 / 4	0 / 3	0 / 2	0 / 26

== Personal life ==
=== Marriage and relationships ===
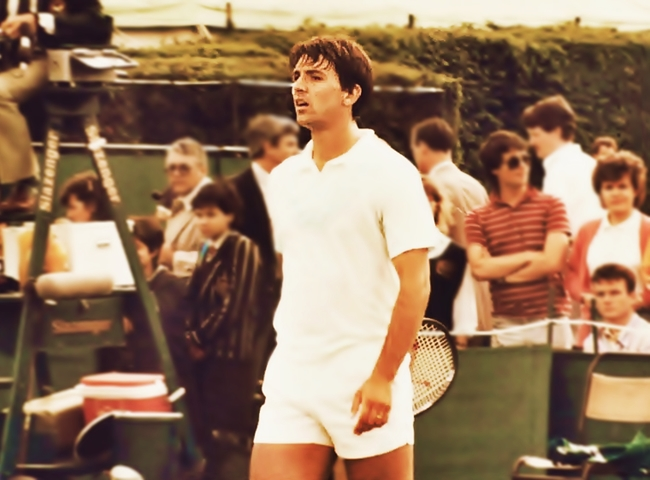
Živojinović at Wimbledon in the mid-1980s

In the early-to-mid 1980s, active professional tennis player Živojinović became engaged to Zorica Desnica. The couple had a son, Filip, in 1985. They split up during the late 1980s.

In October 1989, Živojinović began dating the Yugoslav singer Lepa Brena, having reportedly met her at the premiere of her star vehicle film Hajde da se volimo 2. Their 7 December 1991 wedding—a civic ceremony at Belgrade's InterContinental Hotel with tennis player Ion Țiriac as the groom's best man—was a media event throughout Yugoslavia. The level of attention it generated in the country was such that Brena's manager Raka Đokić subsequently released a VHS tape of the wedding for commercial exploitation. The couple's child, son Stefan Emerald Živojinović, was born in May 1992 in New York City. Their second son, Viktor Ernest Živojinović, was born in March 1998 in Miami.

=== Children ===
On 23 November 2000, Živojinović's and Lepa Brena's eight-year-old son Stefan was kidnapped by members of the Zemun Clan organized crime group in front of the family's home in Belgrade. Five days later, after his family paid a ransom reported to be more than DM2 million, the child was released by being left on the side of the Belgrade—Niš motorway.

Sporting positions
Preceded by (France) Yannick Noah (Ecuador) Andrés Gómez (Ecuador) Andrés Gómez	World No. 1 (doubles); August 25, 1986 - September 7, 1986; September 22, 1986 - October 19, 1986; November 10, 1986 - November 23, 1986	Succeeded by (Ecuador) Andrés Gómez (Ecuador) Andrés Gómez (Ecuador) Andrés Gómez
Preceded by Boško Ivanović	President of the Tennis Federation of Serbia; 2006–2011	Succeeded by Vuk Jeremić
