= 1994 Australian Open – Men's singles qualifying =

Men's singles qualifying
- 1994 Australian Open

Events
Singles	men	women		boys	girls
Doubles	men	women	mixed	boys	girls
WC Singles	men	women	quad
WC Doubles	men	women	quad
Legends	men	women	mixed

Qualification
Singles	men	women
- Australian Open

This article displays the qualifying draw for men's singles at the 1994 Australian Open.

== Seeds ==
1. (United Kingdom) Mark Petchey (second round)
2. (South Africa) Kevin Ullyett (first round)
3. (Sweden) Jan Apell (second round)
4. (Germany) Hendrik Dreekmann (qualified)
5. (Sweden) Tomas Nydahl (qualified)
6. (United States) Kenny Thorne (qualified)
7. (United States) Chris Garner (qualifying competition, lucky loser)
8. (Germany) Markus Zoecke (qualified)
9. (Slovakia) Karol Kučera (first round)
10. (South Africa) David Nainkin (qualified)
11. (Israel) Gilad Bloom (first round)
12. (Belgium) Filip Dewulf (qualified)
13. (The Bahamas) Mark Knowles (qualifying competition, lucky loser)
14. (United States) David Witt (qualifying competition)
15. (Germany) Arne Thoms (qualifying competition)
16. (United States) Jim Grabb (qualifying competition)
17. (Canada) Daniel Nestor (second round)
18. (United Kingdom) Andrew Foster (second round)
19. (Australia) Simon Youl (second round)
20. (Germany) Michael Geserer (second round)
21. (Netherlands) Fernon Wibier (second round)
22. (United States) Martin Blackman (qualifying competition)
23. (South Africa) Mark Kaplan (first round)
24. (South Africa) David Adams (second round)
25. (United States) Michael Joyce (second round)
26. (Kenya) Paul Wekesa (qualified)
27. (Austria) Thomas Gollwitzer (first round)
28. (South Africa) Lan Bale (first round)
29. (Australia) Peter Tramacchi (first round)
30. (Czech Republic) Libor Němeček (first round)
31. (The Bahamas) Roger Smith (qualified)
32. (Australia) Grant Doyle (first round)

== Qualifiers ==
1. (Sweden) Lars-Anders Wahlgren
2. (The Bahamas) Roger Smith
3. (United States) Kent Kinnear
4. (Germany) Hendrik Dreekmann
5. (Sweden) Tomas Nydahl
6. (United States) Kenny Thorne
7. (Kenya) Paul Wekesa
8. (Germany) Markus Zoecke
9. (Japan) Ryuso Tsujino
10. (South Africa) David Nainkin
11. (United States) Ryan Blake
12. (Belgium) Filip Dewulf
13. (Sweden) Thomas Johansson
14. (United States) Brian MacPhie
15. (Australia) Andrew Kratzmann
16. (United States) John Sullivan

== Lucky losers ==
1. (The Bahamas) Mark Knowles
2. (United States) Chris Garner

== Qualifying draw ==
Key

- Q = Qualifier
- WC = Wild card
- LL = Lucky loser
- Alt = Alternate
- ITF = ITF entry
- PR = Protected ranking
- SR = Special ranking
- SE = Special exempt
- JE = Junior exempt
- JR = Junior Accelerator Programme entrant
- CO = College Accelerator Programme entrant
- NG = Next Gen Accelerator Program entrant
- w/o = Walkover
- r = Retired
- d = Defaulted

=== First qualifier ===
First round
1	(United Kingdom) Mark Petchey	6	4	6
WC	(Australia) Jay Salter	2	6	0
(Germany) Lars Burgsmüller	6^{5}	6	6
(United States) Michael Shyjan	7^{7}	2	3
(France) Bertrand Lemercier	2	6^{9}
(France) Nicolas Escudé	6	7^{11}
(Sweden) Lars-Anders Wahlgren	6	6
32	(Australia) Grant Doyle	3	2

Second round
1	(United Kingdom) Mark Petchey	6^{10}	3
(Germany) Lars Burgsmüller	7^{12}	6
(France) Nicolas Escudé	1	1
(Sweden) Lars-Anders Wahlgren	6	6

Qualifying competition
(Germany) Lars Burgsmüller	3	1
(Sweden) Lars-Anders Wahlgren	6	6

=== Second qualifier ===
First round
2	(South Africa) Kevin Ullyett	1	2
(United States) Alex Reichel	6	6
(Netherlands) Tom Nijssen	6	6
(Spain) Juan-Albert Viloca-Puig	2	0
WC	(Australia) Allen Belobrajdic	4	4
(South Africa) Ellis Ferreira	6	6
(Australia) Andrew McLean	4	4
31	(The Bahamas) Roger Smith	6	6

Second round
(United States) Alex Reichel	6	6
(Netherlands) Tom Nijssen	4	3
(South Africa) Ellis Ferreira	4	4
31	(The Bahamas) Roger Smith	6	6

Qualifying competition
(United States) Alex Reichel	0	5
31	(The Bahamas) Roger Smith	6	7

=== Third qualifier ===
First round
3	(Sweden) Jan Apell	6	6
(Sweden) Mårten Renström	3	4
WC	(Australia) Andrew Painter	4	0
(South Korea) Yoon Yong-il	6	6
(United States) David Lomicky	6	7
(Japan) Thomas Shimada	1	5
(United States) Kent Kinnear	7^{7}	5	6
29	(Australia) Peter Tramacchi	6^{4}	7	0

Second round
3	(Sweden) Jan Apell	6^{3}	2
(South Korea) Yoon Yong-il	7^{7}	6
(United States) David Lomicky	1	2
(United States) Kent Kinnear	6	6

Qualifying competition
(South Korea) Yoon Yong-il	6^{2}	3
(United States) Kent Kinnear	7^{7}	6

=== Fourth qualifier ===
First round
4	(Germany) Hendrik Dreekmann	6	6
(South Korea) Lee Jin-soo	4	1
(United States) David DiLucia	6	7^{7}
(Australia) Steven Baldas	1	6^{5}
(Federal Republic of Yugoslavia) Bojan Vujić	6	2	4
(United States) Jack Waite	4	6	6
(United States) Rick Leach	6	7
30	(Czech Republic) Libor Němeček	2	5

Second round
4	(Germany) Hendrik Dreekmann	6	6
(United States) David DiLucia	2	4
(United States) Jack Waite	6^{3}	7^{7}	4
(United States) Rick Leach	7^{7}	6^{5}	6

Qualifying competition
4	(Germany) Hendrik Dreekmann	5	6	6
(United States) Rick Leach	7	2	1

=== Fifth qualifier ===
First round
5	(Sweden) Tomas Nydahl	6	6
(United States) Todd Nelson	3	0
(Australia) Heath Denman	7^{7}	7^{8}
(Australia) Ben Ellwood	6^{1}	6^{6}
(United Kingdom) Neil Broad	2	6	4
(United States) Donald Johnson	6	3	6
WC	(Australia) James Sekulov	6	6
28	(South Africa) Lan Bale	3	2

Second round
5	(Sweden) Tomas Nydahl	6	6
(Australia) Heath Denman	2	3
(United States) Donald Johnson	4	6	9
WC	(Australia) James Sekulov	6	4	7

Qualifying competition
5	(Sweden) Tomas Nydahl	6	4
(United States) Donald Johnson	1	1^{r}

=== Sixth qualifier ===
First round
6	(United States) Kenny Thorne	6	6
(Australia) Johan Anderson	2	2
(South Africa) Johan de Beer	7^{9}	6
(Canada) Andrew Sznajder	6^{7}	4
(France) Sébastien Hette	2	1
(United States) Brian Dunn	6	6
(United States) Jeff Belloli	7	3	9
27	(Austria) Thomas Gollwitzer	5	6	7

Second round
6	(United States) Kenny Thorne	6	6
(South Africa) Johan de Beer	2	3
(United States) Brian Dunn	3	4
(United States) Jeff Belloli	6	6

Qualifying competition
6	(United States) Kenny Thorne	6^{3}	6	6
(United States) Jeff Belloli	7^{7}	4	3

=== Seventh qualifier ===
First round
7	(United States) Chris Garner	7^{8}	6
(North Macedonia) Aleksandar Kitinov	6^{6}	2
(Japan) Yasufumi Yamamoto	1	6^{5}
(France) Lionel Roux	6	7^{7}
(South Korea) Chung Jong-sam	6	4	5
WC	(Australia) Bradley Sceney	1	6	7
(Australia) Ashley Naumann	2	4
26	(Kenya) Paul Wekesa	6	6

Second round
7	(United States) Chris Garner	6	3	9
(France) Lionel Roux	1	6	7
WC	(Australia) Bradley Sceney	6	3	2
26	(Kenya) Paul Wekesa	3	6	6

Qualifying competition
7	(United States) Chris Garner	5	4
26	(Kenya) Paul Wekesa	7	6

=== Eighth qualifier ===
First round
8	(Germany) Markus Zoecke	6	6
(United States) Paul Goldstein	4	4
(India) Leander Paes	6	3
(France) Stéphane Andriolo	3	0^{r}
(Australia) Matthew MacMahon	2	2
(South Africa) Chris Haggard	6	6
(Australia) Richard Nicholls	7^{7}	4	3
25	(United States) Michael Joyce	6^{1}	6	6

Second round
8	(Germany) Markus Zoecke	6	7^{9}
(India) Leander Paes	3	6^{7}
(South Africa) Chris Haggard	3	7^{7}	6
25	(United States) Michael Joyce	6	6^{4}	4

Qualifying competition
8	(Germany) Markus Zoecke	6	6
(South Africa) Chris Haggard	4	1

=== Ninth qualifier ===
First round
9	(Slovakia) Karol Kučera	5	6^{1}
(United States) Tony Bujan	7	7^{7}
(Germany) Lars Rehmann	6	3	8
(South Korea) Song Hyeong-keun	1	6	6
(Japan) Toshitsugu Mori	3	1
(Japan) Ryuso Tsujino	6	6
WC	(Australia) John Fitzgerald	4	0
24	(South Africa) David Adams	6	6

Second round
(United States) Tony Bujan	2	4
(Germany) Lars Rehmann	6	6
(Japan) Ryuso Tsujino	6	6
24	(South Africa) David Adams	2	4

Qualifying competition
(Germany) Lars Rehmann	2	4
(Japan) Ryuso Tsujino	6	6

=== Tenth qualifier ===
First round
10	(South Africa) David Nainkin	6	6
(South Africa) Clinton Ferreira	1	4
WC	(Australia) Broderick Dyke	6	6^{7}	6
(United States) Scott Stewart	4	7^{9}	2
(United States) David Pate	6	6
(United States) Murphy Jensen	2	1
(South Africa) Piet Norval	6	4	9
23	(South Africa) Mark Kaplan	4	6	7

Second round
10	(South Africa) David Nainkin	7	6
WC	(Australia) Broderick Dyke	5	3
(United States) David Pate	6	2	6
(South Africa) Piet Norval	4	6	8

Qualifying competition
10	(South Africa) David Nainkin	6	6
(South Africa) Piet Norval	3	2

=== Eleventh qualifier ===
First round
11	(Israel) Gilad Bloom	1	6	3
(United States) Ryan Blake	6	1	6
(South Korea) Kim Bong-soo	6	5	3
(Netherlands) Tom Kempers	3	7	6
(Germany) Christian Vinck	1	0
(United States) Louis Gloria	6	6
WC	(Australia) Scott Draper	2	4
21	(Netherlands) Fernon Wibier	6	6

Second round
(United States) Ryan Blake	6	6
(Netherlands) Tom Kempers	3	4
(United States) Louis Gloria	7^{7}	0	6
21	(Netherlands) Fernon Wibier	6^{5}	6	2

Qualifying competition
(United States) Ryan Blake	7	6
(United States) Louis Gloria	5	1

=== Twelfth qualifier ===
First round
12	(Belgium) Filip Dewulf	4	6	6
(Netherlands) Hendrik Jan Davids	6	3	2
(Australia) Michael Hegarty	4	6	6
(United States) Scott Hulse	6	1	2
(Australia) Darren Patten	3	6^{3}
(United States) Eric Amend	6	7^{7}
(Australia) Leigh Holland	3	2
22	(United States) Martin Blackman	6	6

Second round
12	(Belgium) Filip Dewulf	6	6
(Australia) Michael Hegarty	2	3
(United States) Eric Amend	3	3
22	(United States) Martin Blackman	6	6

Qualifying competition
12	(Belgium) Filip Dewulf	6	6
22	(United States) Martin Blackman	4	2

=== Thirteenth qualifier ===
First round
13	(The Bahamas) Mark Knowles	6^{8}	7^{7}	6
(Netherlands) Joost Winnink	7^{10}	6^{1}	2
(United States) Luke Jensen	2	7	3
(Germany) Patrick Baur	6	5	6
(Sweden) Thomas Johansson	6	6
(Sweden) Magnus Norman	4	3
(Australia) James Holmes	2	3
19	(Australia) Simon Youl	6	6

Second round
13	(The Bahamas) Mark Knowles	6	6
(Germany) Patrick Baur	4	2
(Sweden) Thomas Johansson	7^{7}	4	6
19	(Australia) Simon Youl	6^{3}	6	3

Qualifying competition
13	(The Bahamas) Mark Knowles	4	6	4
(Sweden) Thomas Johansson	6	0	6

=== Fourteenth qualifier ===
First round
14	(United States) David Witt	6	2	6
(United States) Doug Eisenman	2	6	4
(Germany) Axel Finnberg	6	7
(United States) Vince Spadea	1	5
(United States) Brian MacPhie	6	6
(Australia) Wayne Arthurs	4	4
(United States) Michael Roberts	2	3
20	(Germany) Michael Geserer	6	6

Second round
14	(United States) David Witt	7^{7}	6
(Germany) Axel Finnberg	6^{2}	3
(United States) Brian MacPhie	7	6
20	(Germany) Michael Geserer	5	2

Qualifying competition
14	(United States) David Witt	2	3
(United States) Brian MacPhie	6	6

=== Fifteenth qualifier ===
First round
15	(Germany) Arne Thoms	6	7
(Germany) Oliver Trott	3	5
(Australia) Stephen Gleeson	4	1
(United States) Brian Devening	6	6
(Australia) Andrew Ilie	2	4
(Australia) Andrew Kratzmann	6	6
(Australia) Andrew Florent	6	5	2
17	(Canada) Daniel Nestor	2	7	6

Second round
15	(Germany) Arne Thoms	4	6	10
(United States) Brian Devening	6	4	8
(Australia) Andrew Kratzmann	6	3	6
17	(Canada) Daniel Nestor	4	6	3

Qualifying competition
15	(Germany) Arne Thoms	6^{9}	7^{7}	1
(Australia) Andrew Kratzmann	7^{11}	6^{5}	6

=== Sixteenth qualifier ===
First round
16	(United States) Jim Grabb	6^{5}	6	6
(Japan) Tetsuya Chaen	7^{7}	1	1
(United States) Paul Garvin	3	1
(United States) Bret Garnett	6	6
(United States) Steve DeVries	5	3
(United States) John Sullivan	7	6
(Australia) Mark Draper	3	2
18	(United Kingdom) Andrew Foster	6	6

Second round
16	(United States) Jim Grabb	6	6
(United States) Bret Garnett	4	1
(United States) John Sullivan	6	6
18	(United Kingdom) Andrew Foster	3	3

Qualifying competition
16	(United States) Jim Grabb	1	6	3
(United States) John Sullivan	6	3	6
