= Chung Jong-sam =

South Korean tennis player

- Country (sports): South Korea
- Born: 8 May 1973 (age 51)

Singles
- Highest ranking: No. 516 (21 July 1997)

Grand Slam singles results
- Australian Open: Q1 (1994)

Doubles
- Career record: 0–1
- Highest ranking: No. 420 (21 July 1997)

Chung Jong-sam (born 8 May 1973) is a South Korean former professional tennis player.

Chung reached career best rankings of 516 in singles and 420 in doubles. He featured in the singles qualifying draw for the 1994 Australian Open and made his only ATP Tour main draw appearance in doubles at the 1996 Korea Open.
