= 1993 US Open – Mixed doubles =

Mixed doubles
- 1993 US Open

Final
- Champions: (Czech Republic) Helena Suková (Australia) Todd Woodbridge
- Runners-up: (United States) Martina Navratilova (Australia) Mark Woodforde
- Score: 6–3, 7–6^{(8–6)}

Details
- Draw: 32
- Seeds: 8

Events
Singles	men	women		boys	girls
Doubles	men	women	mixed	boys	girls
WC Singles	men	women	quad
WC Doubles	men	women	quad
Legends	men	women	mixed
- US Open

Nicole Provis and Mark Woodforde were the defending champions but only Woodforde competed that year with Martina Navratilova.

Navratilova and Woodforde lost in the final 6–3, 7–6^{(8–6)} against Helena Suková and Todd Woodbridge.

== Seeds ==
Champion seeds are indicated in bold text while text in italics indicates the round in which those seeds were eliminated.

1. (Czech Republic) **Helena Suková** / (Australia) **Todd Woodbridge (champions)**
2. (United States) Martina Navratilova / (Australia) Mark Woodforde (final)
3. (Belarus) Natasha Zvereva / (Australia) Mark Kratzmann (quarterfinals)
4. (Australia) Elizabeth Smylie / (Australia) John Fitzgerald (second round)
5. (United States) Kathy Rinaldi / (United States) Patrick Galbraith (semifinals)
6. (Spain) Conchita Martínez / (Spain) Sergio Casal (semifinals)
7. (United States) Zina Garrison-Jackson / (United States) Rick Leach (first round)
8. (Netherlands) Manon Bollegraf / (Netherlands) Tom Nijssen (quarterfinals)

== Draw ==
Key

- Q = Qualifier
- WC = Wild card
- LL = Lucky loser
- Alt = Alternate
- ITF = ITF entry
- PR = Protected ranking
- SR = Special ranking
- SE = Special exempt
- JE = Junior exempt
- JR = Junior Accelerator Programme entrant
- CO = College Accelerator Programme entrant
- NG = Next Gen Accelerator Program entrant
- w/o = Walkover
- r = Retired
- d = Defaulted

=== Final ===
Final
1	(Czech Republic) **Helena Suková** (Australia) **Todd Woodbridge**	**6**	**7^{8}**
2	(United States) Martina Navratilova (Australia) Mark Woodforde	3	6^{6}

=== Top half ===
First round
1	(Czech Republic) **H Suková** (Australia) **T Woodbridge**	**7**	**6**
(Germany) C Porwik (Czech Republic) C Suk	5	4
(United States) D Graham (United States) S Melville	3	6^{4}
(United States) **K Adams** (Sweden) **R Bergh**	**6**	**7^{7}**
(Latvia) **L Neiland** (Russia) **A Olhovskiy**	**6**	**6**
(Argentina) M Paz (Australia) D Macpherson	2	4
(United States) P Shriver (United States) M Keil	3	**7^{7}**	3
8	(Netherlands) **M Bollegraf** (Netherlands) **T Nijssen**	**6**	6^{3}	**6**
4	(Australia) **E Smylie** (Australia) **J Fitzgerald**	**6**	**7^{7}**
WC	(United States) A Grossman (United States) J Pugh	3	6^{5}
(Canada) **J Hetherington** (Canada) **G Michibata**	**7**	**6**
(United States) P Fendick (United States) S DeVries	5	3
(United States) L McNeil (United States) K Flach	4	6^{10}
(South Africa) **A Coetzer** (South Africa) **S Kruger**	**6**	**7^{12}**
(Czech Republic) A Strnadová (Australia) L Warder	2	4
6	(Spain) **C Martínez** (Spain) **S Casal**	**6**	**6**

Second round
1	(Czech Republic) **H Suková** (Australia) **T Woodbridge**	6^{3}	**6**	**7**
(United States) K Adams (Sweden) R Bergh	**7^{7}**	3	5
(Latvia) L Neiland (Russia) A Olhovskiy	**6**	3	2
8	(Netherlands) **M Bollegraf** (Netherlands) **T Nijssen**	2	**6**	**6**
4	(Australia) E Smylie (Australia) J Fitzgerald	6^{4}	3
(Canada) **J Hetherington** (Canada) **G Michibata**	**7^{7}**	**6**
(South Africa) A Coetzer (South Africa) S Kruger	3	2
6	(Spain) **C Martínez** (Spain) **S Casal**	**6**	**6**

Quarterfinals
1	(Czech Republic) **H Suková** (Australia) **T Woodbridge**	**6**	**6**
8	(Netherlands) M Bollegraf (Netherlands) T Nijssen	4	3
(Canada) J Hetherington (Canada) G Michibata	6^{5}	3
6	(Spain) **C Martínez** (Spain) **S Casal**	**7^{7}**	**6**

Semifinals
1	(Czech Republic) **H Suková** (Australia) **T Woodbridge**	**6**	**6**
6	(Spain) C Martínez (Spain) S Casal	2	1

=== Bottom half ===
First round
5	(United States) **K Rinaldi** (United States) **P Galbraith**	**6**	**6**
(Ukraine) N Medvedeva (Netherlands) P Haarhuis	2	2
(United States) **M McGrath** (United States) **L Jensen**	**7**	**6**
(Australia) R Stubbs (South Africa) B Talbot	5	4
(Netherlands) **B Schultz** (United States) **M Jensen**	**6**	**7^{7}**
(United States) G Fernández (United States) S Davis	3	6^{4}
WC	(United States) L Harvey-Wild (United States) B Pearce	3	**6**	2
3	(Belarus) **N Zvereva** (Australia) **M Kratzmann**	**6**	1	**6**
7	(United States) Z Garrison-Jackson (United States) R Leach	5	**6**	6^{3}
(United States) **R White** (Canada) **G Connell**	**7**	2	**7^{7}**
WC	(United States) B Nagelsen (United States) K Jones	**6**	2	2
(South Africa) **E Reinach** (South Africa) **D Visser**	0	**6**	**6**
WC	(United States) **C Rubin** (United States) **B MacPhie**	**6**	**6**
(Italy) L Ferrando (South Africa) P Norval	4	0
(Russia) E Maniokova (South Africa) D Adams	4	4
2	(United States) **M Navratilova** (Australia) **M Woodforde**	**6**	**6**

Second round
5	(United States) **K Rinaldi** (United States) **P Galbraith**	**6**	**6**
(United States) M McGrath (United States) L Jensen	4	4
(Netherlands) B Schultz (United States) M Jensen	3	0
3	(Belarus) **N Zvereva** (Australia) **M Kratzmann**	**6**	**6**
(United States) **R White** (Canada) **G Connell**	**7^{7}**	**6**
(South Africa) E Reinach (South Africa) D Visser	6^{4}	4
WC	(United States) C Rubin (United States) B MacPhie	4	4
2	(United States) **M Navratilova** (Australia) **M Woodforde**	**6**	**6**

Quarterfinals
5	(United States) **K Rinaldi** (United States) **P Galbraith**	**6**	5	**6**
3	(Belarus) N Zvereva (Australia) M Kratzmann	3	**7**	3
(United States) R White (Canada) G Connell	3	2
2	(United States) **M Navratilova** (Australia) **M Woodforde**	**6**	**6**

Semifinals
5	(United States) K Rinaldi (United States) P Galbraith	5	3
2	(United States) **M Navratilova** (Australia) **M Woodforde**	**7**	**6**
