= Jason Cask =

Australian tennis player

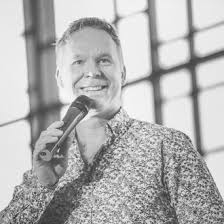
- Portrait of Cask preaching at C7 Church, Glasgow
- Country (sports): Australia
- Residence: Glasgow, Scotland
- Born: 7 February 1971 (age 54); Sydney, Australia
- Height: 5 ft 10 in (178 cm)
- Turned pro: 1989
- Plays: Right-handed
- Prize money: $12,704

Singles
- Career record: 1–2
- Career titles: 0
- Highest ranking: No. 314 (30 September 1991)

Grand Slam singles results
- Australian Open: 1R (1992)

Jason Cask (born 7 February 1971) is a former professional tennis player from Australia. He was born in Sydney, Australia.

== Tennis career ==
Cask, who was coached by Terry Rocavert, made the quarter-finals of the boys' singles at the 1988 Australian Open and was a boys' doubles semi-finalist at the 1989 Australian Open (with William O'Neil).

He first attempted qualification for the men's draw in 1988 and continued to participate in the qualifiers every year without success, until he received a wild card into the 1992 Australian Open. In the first round he faced American 15th seed David Wheaton and lost in straight sets.

During the 1991 ATP Tour season, Cask took part in the Queensland Open and made it to the second round, beating Neil Borwick.
