= Tony Bujan =

American tennis player

- Country (sports): United States
- Height: 5 ft 11 in (180 cm)

Singles
- Career record: 0–1
- Highest ranking: No. 477 (May 9, 1994)

Grand Slam singles results
- Australian Open: Q2 (1994)
- US Open: Q1 (1993)

Doubles
- Highest ranking: No. 325 (July 5, 1993)

Tony Bujan is an American former tennis player.

Bujan grew up in Palm Desert, California and attended Indio High School. He played collegiate tennis for Texas Christian University, earning All-American honors in 1990 and 1992. His only ATP Tour main draw appearance came as a qualifier at the 1993 Los Angeles Open, where he lost his first round match in three sets to world number 70 Jeff Tarango. He reached his best singles world ranking of 477 in 1994.
