= 1992 Australian Open – Men's singles =

Men's singles
- 1992 Australian Open

Final
- Champion: (United States) Jim Courier
- Runner-up: (Sweden) Stefan Edberg
- Score: 6–3, 3–6, 6–4, 6–2

Details
- Draw: 128
- Seeds: 16

Events
Singles	men	women		boys	girls
Doubles	men	women	mixed	boys	girls
WC Singles	men	women	quad
WC Doubles	men	women	quad
Legends	men	women	mixed
- Australian Open

Jim Courier defeated Stefan Edberg in the final, 6–3, 3–6, 6–4, 6–2 to win the men's singles tennis title at the 1992 Australian Open. It was his first Australian Open title and second major singles title overall. By winning the title, Courier overtook Edberg as the new ATP world No. 1.

Boris Becker was the defending champion, but lost in the third round to John McEnroe.

Future world No. 1 and two-time major singles champion Pat Rafter made his first major appearance.

This was the first time overall in the Open Era that a semifinal match at a major resulted in a walkover. Courier received a walkover into the final after Richard Krajicek withdrew before the match, because of tendinitis in his shoulder.

== Seeds ==
1. (Sweden) Stefan Edberg (final)
2. (United States) Jim Courier (champion)
3. (Germany) Boris Becker (third round)
4. (Germany) Michael Stich (quarterfinals)
5. (Czechoslovakia) Ivan Lendl (quarterfinals)
6. (United States) ~~Pete Sampras~~ (withdrew because of a shoulder tendon injury)
7. (France) Guy Forget (second round)
8. (Czechoslovakia) Karel Nováček (second round)

9. (Czechoslovakia) Petr Korda (first round)
10. (Croatia) Goran Ivanišević (second round)
11. (Sweden) Magnus Gustafsson (second round)
12. (United States) Derrick Rostagno (second round)
13. (Spain) Emilio Sánchez (fourth round)
14. (United States) Michael Chang (third round)
15. (United States) David Wheaton (fourth round)
16. (Croatia) Goran Prpić (second round)

Click on the seed number of a player to go to their draw section.^{[a]}

== Draw ==
Key

- Q = Qualifier
- WC = Wild card
- LL = Lucky loser
- Alt = Alternate
- ITF = ITF entry
- PR = Protected ranking
- SR = Special ranking
- SE = Special exempt
- JE = Junior exempt
- JR = Junior Accelerator Programme entrant
- CO = College Accelerator Programme entrant
- NG = Next Gen Accelerator Program entrant
- w/o = Walkover
- r = Retired
- d = Defaulted

=== Finals ===
Quarterfinals
1	(Sweden) Stefan Edberg	4	7	6	6^{5}	6
5	(Czechoslovakia) Ivan Lendl	6	5	1	7^{7}	1
(United States) John McEnroe	4	4	4
(South Africa) Wayne Ferreira	6	6	6
(Netherlands) Richard Krajicek	5	7^{7}	6^{1}	6	6
4	(Germany) Michael Stich	7	6^{2}	7^{7}	4	4
(Israel) Amos Mansdorf	3	2	2
2	(United States) Jim Courier	6	6	6

Semifinals
1	(Sweden) Stefan Edberg	7^{7}	6	6
(South Africa) Wayne Ferreira	6^{2}	1	2
(Netherlands) Richard Krajicek
2	(United States) Jim Courier^{[a]}	w/o

Final
1	(Sweden) Stefan Edberg	3	6	4	2
2	(United States) Jim Courier	6	3	6	6

=== Top half ===
==== Section 1 ====
First round
1	(Sweden) S Edberg	6	6	6
Q	(United Kingdom) J Bates	4	2	4
(Switzerland) C Mezzadri	4	4	6	6	6
WC	(Australia) J Morgan	6	6	3	4	2
Q	(United States) J Palmer	4	6	3	6	2
(Netherlands) J Siemerink	6	4	6	4	6
WC	(Australia) J Fitzgerald	7^{8}	6	7^{7}
(Netherlands) M Koevermans	6^{6}	4	6^{4}
(Spain) MA Gorriz	7^{13}	2	0	1
(Israel) G Bloom	6^{11}	6	6	6
(Commonwealth of Independent States) A Chesnokov	6	7^{7}	6
(France) F Fontang	3	6^{4}	1
(United States) P McEnroe	6	6	6
(Italy) M Cierro	3	4	4
(United States) J Tarango	4	4	6	6	6
9	(Czechoslovakia) P Korda	6	6	3	3	3

Second round
1	(Sweden) S Edberg	6	6	6
(Switzerland) C Mezzadri	1	2	1
(Netherlands) J Siemerink	5	1	6^{4}
WC	(Australia) J Fitzgerald	7	6	7^{7}
(Israel) G Bloom	6	3	4	4
(Commonwealth of Independent States) A Chesnokov	4	6	6	6
(United States) P McEnroe	6	4	6	6
(United States) J Tarango	1	6	4	3

Third round
1	(Sweden) S Edberg	7	6	6
WC	(Australia) J Fitzgerald	5	1	4
(Commonwealth of Independent States) A Chesnokov	6	1	1	6	6
(United States) P McEnroe	4	6	6	1	3

Fourth round
1	(Sweden) S Edberg	6	7	6
(Commonwealth of Independent States) A Chesnokov	1	5	2

==== Section 2 ====
First round
12	(United States) D Rostagno	2	6	1	6	6
Q	(Australia) C Limberger	6	3	6	3	4
(United States) B Gilbert	6	2	1	6	2
Q	(Sweden) L-A Wahlgren	1	6	6	3	6
Q	(Australia) S Youl	6	6	6
(France) G Raoux	2	2	2
(Sweden) T Högstedt	6	2	2	6	1
(Italy) O Camporese	3	6	6	2	6
(Argentina) J Frana	6^{4}	6	1	1
(France) C Pioline	7^{7}	1	6	6
(Germany) M Zoecke	7^{9}	6	6
(Canada) G Connell	6^{7}	3	3
WC	(Australia) R Rasheed	6	2	4	6	6
(Brazil) D Marcelino	4	6	6	2	4
(Australia) R Fromberg	4	2	2
5	(Czechoslovakia) I Lendl	6	6	6

Second round
12	(United States) D Rostagno	1	5	6^{3}
Q	(Sweden) L-A Wahlgren	6	7	7^{7}
Q	(Australia) S Youl	3	4	6^{4}
(Italy) O Camporese	6	6	7^{7}
(France) C Pioline	6	2	6^{5}	6^{5}
(Germany) M Zoecke	3	6	7^{7}	7^{7}
WC	(Australia) R Rasheed	3	2	3
5	(Czechoslovakia) I Lendl	6	6	6

Third round
Q	(Sweden) L-A Wahlgren	4	2	6^{15}
(Italy) O Camporese	6	6	7^{17}
(Germany) M Zoecke	4	4	6^{6}
5	(Czechoslovakia) I Lendl	6	6	7^{8}

Fourth round
(Italy) O Camporese	6^{4}	1	3
5	(Czechoslovakia) I Lendl	7^{7}	6	6

==== Section 3 ====
First round
3	(Germany) B Becker	6	6	6
(Sweden) J Gunnarsson	1	4	2
(United States) B Shelton	6	6^{4}	6	2	2
(Italy) G Pozzi	4	7^{7}	2	6	6
(United States) J McEnroe	6	6	6
Q	(Australia) B Dyke	2	0	1
(Germany) P Kühnen	7^{9}	5	0	1
(Commonwealth of Independent States) A Cherkasov	6^{7}	7	6	6
(France) T Champion	6	1	2	4
(Netherlands) M Schapers	4	6	6	6
(Netherlands) J Eltingh	2	5	6	6	7
(Germany) K Braasch	6	7	3	4	5
(Austria) H Skoff	1	5	6^{6}
WC	(Australia) P Cash	6	7	7^{8}
(Peru) P Arraya	3	2	7^{7}	3
13	(Spain) E Sánchez	6	6	6^{3}	6

Second round
3	(Germany) B Becker	7	7	6
(Italy) G Pozzi	5	5	2
(United States) J McEnroe	7	3	6	6
(Commonwealth of Independent States) A Cherkasov	5	6	4	3
(Netherlands) M Schapers	1	6	5	6	6
(Netherlands) J Eltingh	6	4	7	1	3
WC	(Australia) P Cash	6^{5}	2	7^{11}	6	1
13	(Spain) E Sánchez	7^{7}	6	6^{9}	3	6

Third round
3	(Germany) B Becker	4	3	5
(United States) J McEnroe	6	6	7
(Netherlands) M Schapers	3	4	6^{6}
13	(Spain) E Sánchez	6	6	7^{8}

Fourth round
(United States) J McEnroe	7	7^{7}	4	2	8
13	(Spain) E Sánchez	5	6^{4}	6	6	6

==== Section 4 ====
First round
15	(United States) D Wheaton	6	6	6
WC	(Australia) J Cask	4	0	0
(Sweden) N Kulti	6	6	6^{3}	6
(United States) T Witsken	0	1	7^{7}	3
(Zimbabwe) B Black	4	4	1
(Italy) P Canè	6	6	6
(United States) J Arias	1	6^{2}	0
(Germany) L Koslowski	6	7^{7}	6
(Spain) F Clavet	6	7^{7}	2	7
(Czechoslovakia) M Střelba	2	6^{3}	6	5
(Australia) M Woodforde	6	7^{7}	6
(Peru) J Yzaga	4	6^{5}	1
(South Africa) W Ferreira	6	6	1	6
Q	(Mexico) L Lavalle	2	4	6	3
Q	(United States) D Pate	6	6^{10}	4	1
8	(Czechoslovakia) K Nováček	2	7^{12}	6	6

Second round
15	(United States) D Wheaton	6	5	6	2	8
(Sweden) N Kulti	3	7	4	6	6
(Italy) P Canè	2	6	6^{1}	2
(Germany) L Koslowski	6	1	7^{7}	6
(Spain) F Clavet	7^{7}	4	1	6	5
(Australia) M Woodforde	6^{4}	6	6	3	7
(South Africa) W Ferreira	3	6	7^{8}	7^{9}
8	(Czechoslovakia) K Nováček	6	3	6^{6}	6^{7}

Third round
15	(United States) D Wheaton	6	6	6
(Germany) L Koslowski	4	3	3
(Australia) M Woodforde	6	3	2	2
(South Africa) W Ferreira	4	6	6	6

Fourth round
15	(United States) D Wheaton	7^{7}	4	2	2
(South Africa) W Ferreira	6^{3}	6	6	6

=== Bottom half ===
==== Section 5 ====
First round
7	(France) G Forget	2	6	6^{5}	6	6
WC	(France) H Leconte	6	4	7^{7}	4	3
(Sweden) L Jönsson	6^{7}	6^{6}	3
(Sweden) C Bergström	7^{9}	7^{8}	6
(Brazil) J Oncins	6	2	5	6	2
WC	(Australia) S Stolle	3	6	7	4	6
Q	(United States) B Garnett	6	6	6
WC	(Australia) G Doyle	4	2	4
Q	(Australia) P Rafter	6	0	6^{3}	2
(United States) J Grabb	3	6	7^{7}	6
(Netherlands) R Krajicek	6	6	6
(Germany) C Saceanu	3	3	3
(Italy) C Caratti	6^{3}	6	6	6
(United States) C Adams	7^{7}	3	3	0
(Brazil) F Roese	2	3	0
14	(United States) M Chang	6	6	6

Second round
7	(France) G Forget	6^{5}	6	3	4
(Sweden) C Bergström	7^{7}	2	6	6
WC	(Australia) S Stolle	6	6	5	2	2
Q	(United States) B Garnett	4	1	7	6	6
(United States) J Grabb	2	6^{2}	1
(Netherlands) R Krajicek	6	7^{7}	6
(Italy) C Caratti	3	6	4	4
14	(United States) M Chang	6	3	6	6

Third round
(Sweden) C Bergström	6	6	4	6
Q	(United States) B Garnett	2	3	6	2
(Netherlands) R Krajicek	6	6	5	1	6
14	(United States) M Chang	4	1	7	6	3

Fourth round
(Sweden) C Bergström	5	6^{6}	3
(Netherlands) R Krajicek	7	7^{8}	6

==== Section 6 ====
First round
16	(Croatia) G Prpić	6	6	7^{7}
Q	(United States) G Layendecker	3	4	6^{4}
(United States) M Washington	6	6	6
Q	(South Africa) G Stafford	4	2	1
(Australia) W Masur	4	6	4	6	6
(Czechoslovakia) M Vajda	6	4	6	2	2
(Italy) S Pescosolido	6	6	7
Q	(Canada) D Nestor	4	4	5
(France) O Delaître	6^{5}	6	6	6
(Argentina) C Miniussi	7^{7}	4	3	2
(Argentina) M Jaite	3	7	6	3	8
(South Africa) C van Rensburg	6	5	1	6	6
(Sweden) J Svensson	6	7	6
(Japan) S Matsuoka	0	5	3
(Spain) J Sánchez	5	1	6	3
4	(Germany) M Stich	7	6	4	6

Second round
16	(Croatia) G Prpić	2	4	3
(United States) M Washington	6	6	6
(Australia) W Masur	7^{7}	6	6
(Italy) S Pescosolido	6^{3}	0	4
(France) O Delaître	6	0	0^{r}
(Argentina) M Jaite	3	6	1
(Sweden) J Svensson	4	1	6	4
4	(Germany) M Stich	6	6	1	6

Third round
(United States) M Washington	3	3	4
(Australia) W Masur	6	6	6
(Argentina) M Jaite	0	6	5	2
4	(Germany) M Stich	6	2	7	6

Fourth round
(Australia) W Masur	6	4	6^{5}	4
4	(Germany) M Stich	3	6	7^{7}	6

==== Section 7 ====
First round
LL	(Sweden) P Lundgren	4	6	3	4
(Israel) A Mansdorf	6	3	6	6
(Italy) D Nargiso	3	3	4
(France) A Boetsch	6	6	6
(Italy) C Pistolesi	3	6	6	3	3
(Commonwealth of Independent States) D Poliakov	6	3	4	6	6
(United States) R Reneberg	6	6	7
(Belgium) B Wuyts	2	4	5
(Germany) P Baur	6	6	6^{3}	6
Q	(Sweden) N Kroon	3	4	7^{7}	1
(Commonwealth of Independent States) A Volkov	6	6	6
(Australia) T Woodbridge	3	2	1
(Sweden) A Järryd	3	7^{9}	2	3
(United States) A Krickstein	6	6^{7}	6	6
(Australia) J Stoltenberg	6^{12}	3	4
10	(Croatia) G Ivanišević	7^{14}	6	6

Second round
(Israel) A Mansdorf	6	7	6
(France) A Boetsch	1	5	0
(Commonwealth of Independent States) D Poliakov	6	3	6^{2}	6	7
(United States) R Reneberg	3	6	7^{7}	4	9
(Germany) P Baur	4	4	2
(Commonwealth of Independent States) A Volkov	6	6	6
(United States) A Krickstein	6	7	6
10	(Croatia) G Ivanišević	2	5	1

Third round
(Israel) A Mansdorf	6	6	6
(United States) R Reneberg	1	4	3
(Commonwealth of Independent States) A Volkov	4	7	7^{7}	1	6
(United States) A Krickstein	6	5	6^{2}	6	8

Fourth round
(Israel) A Mansdorf^{[b]}	6	4	1	7^{7}	4
(United States) A Krickstein	2	6	6	6^{4}	1^{r}

==== Section 8 ====
First round
11	(Sweden) M Gustafsson	6	6	6
(South Africa) G Muller	4	3	3
(Argentina) H de la Peña	1	2	1
(Switzerland) M Rosset	6	6	6
(Ecuador) A Gómez	6	6	4	3	4
Q	(Finland) A Rahunen	4	3	6	6	6
(Italy) R Furlan	4	2	2
(Germany) C-U Steeb	6	6	6
(France) J-P Fleurian	6^{2}	1	5
(Austria) T Muster	7^{7}	6	7
(Switzerland) J Hlasek	0	6	6	4	2
(Netherlands) P Haarhuis	6	2	2	6	6
(Sweden) M Larsson	5	6^{6}	5
Q	(Sweden) T Enqvist	7	7^{8}	7
(France) R Gilbert	4	6^{4}	3
2	(United States) J Courier	6	7^{7}	6

Second round
11	(Sweden) M Gustafsson	3	5	6	6	3
(Switzerland) M Rosset	6	7	4	3	6
Q	(Finland) A Rahunen	4	2	5
(Germany) C-U Steeb	6	6	7
(Austria) T Muster	6	6	7^{7}
(Netherlands) P Haarhuis	4	4	6^{3}
Q	(Sweden) T Enqvist	6	3	1	4
2	(United States) J Courier	2	6	6	6

Third round
(Switzerland) M Rosset	6	6	6
(Germany) C-U Steeb	4	4	3
(Austria) T Muster	1	4	2
2	(United States) J Courier	6	6	6

Fourth round
(Switzerland) M Rosset	3	1	3
2	(United States) J Courier	6	6	6

== Notes ==
a. Andre Agassi (No. 10) and Sergi Bruguera (No. 11) both withdrew from the tournament prior to the seedings.
b. No. 2 seed Jim Courier received a walkover into the final after Richard Krajicek withdrew from the tournament because of tendinitis in the shoulder.
c. Amos Mansdorf advanced to the quarterfinals after Aaron Krickstein retired in the fifth set citing nausea and exhaustion.

Preceded by 1990 US Open	Grand Slam men's singles	Succeeded by 1992 French Open
