= Brad Sceney =

Australian tennis player

- Full name: Bradley Sceney
- Country (sports): Australia
- Born: 24 January 1974 (age 51)

Singles
- Highest ranking: No. 689 (23 May 1994)

Grand Slam singles results
- Australian Open: Q2 (1993, 1994)

Doubles
- Career record: 0–1
- Highest ranking: No. 391 (24 Oct 1994)

Bradley Sceney (born 24 January 1974) is an Australian former professional tennis player.

Sceney was a World Youth Cup (Junior Davis Cup) representative for Australia and won the junior doubles title at the 1992 Australian Open, with Grant Doyle. He has featured in men's singles qualifying draws for the Australian Open.

From 1995 to 1998, Sceney played collegiate tennis for Pepperdine University and broke the team record for career singles wins. He earned All-American honours for doubles in 1996, reaching the NCAA doubles championship quarter-finals that year. While at Pepperdine he made an ATP Tour doubles main draw appearance at Indian Wells.

Sceney, now a resident of the United States, is a former men's head coach at Loyola Marymount University.
