= Johan de Beer =

South African tennis player

- Full name: Johan de Beer
- Country (sports): South Africa
- Born: 1 June 1972 (age 52); Pretoria, Transvaal Province
- Retired: 1994
- Prize money: $53,581

Singles
- Career record: 0–2
- Career titles: 0
- Highest ranking: No. 397 (15 November 1993)

Doubles
- Career record: 11–17
- Career titles: 0
- Highest ranking: No. 92 (21 February 1994)

Grand Slam doubles results
- Australian Open: 2R (1994)
- US Open: 1R (1993)

Johan "Joey" de Beer (born 1 June 1972) is a former professional tennis player from South Africa.

== Biography ==
De Beer, a doubles specialist from Pretoria, was coached by Kobus Botha. He won a total of four Challenger doubles titles during his career.

In 1993 he reached the doubles final of the South African Open, an ATP Tour tournament in Durban, with Marcos Ondruska.

He appeared twice in the main draw of a Grand Slam event. He partnered Cristian Brandi at the 1993 US Open, for a first round exit, to 16th seeds Hendrik-Jan Davids and Piet Norval. At the 1994 Australian Open he made the second round with John-Laffnie de Jager. In the opening round, de Beer again faced the 16th seeds, but he and de Jager were victorious in straight sets, over Wayne Ferreira and Javier Sánchez. They lost an all South African second round match to Ellis Ferreira and Christo van Rensburg.

Early in the 1994 season he broke into the world's 100 ranked doubles players. It was also his final year on the circuit, he retired from tennis to complete a Physiotherapy degree at the University of Pretoria.

He was at one time coach of Wayne Ferreira and a trainer for Tim Henman.

Currently he works for the Lawn Tennis Association in England as a coach and physiotherapist. He was Andy Murray's physiotherapist when he won the Wimbledon title in 2013.

== ATP Tour career finals ==
=== Doubles: 1 (0–1) ===
Result	W/L	Date	Tournament	Surface	Partner	Opponents	Score
Loss	0–1	Apr 1993	Durban, South Africa	Hard	(South Africa) Marcos Ondruska	(South Africa) Lan Bale (Zimbabwe) Byron Black	6–7, 2–6

== Challenger titles ==
=== Doubles: (4) ===
No.	Year	Tournament	Surface	Partner	Opponents	Score
1.	1993	Cincinnati, US	Hard	(Zimbabwe) Kevin Ullyett	(Australia) Wayne Arthurs (India) Leander Paes	7–6, 6–4
2.	1993	Bronx, US	Hard	(Zimbabwe) Kevin Ullyett	(Australia) Wayne Arthurs (Australia) Grant Doyle	7–6, 7–6
3.	1993	Porto, Portugal	Clay	(South Africa) Brent Haygarth	(Italy) Cristian Brandi (Italy) Federico Mordegan	6–2, 2–6, 7–6
4.	1994	Cherbourg, France	Carpet	(United Kingdom) Neil Broad	(United States) Donald Johnson (United States) Kent Kinnear	7–6, 2–6, 6–3
