= 1992 Australian Open =

- Date: 13–26 January 1992
- Edition: 80th
- Category: Grand Slam (ITF)
- Surface: Hardcourt (Rebound Ace)
- Location: Melbourne, Australia
- Venue: National Tennis Centre at Flinders Park

Champions

Men's singles
- (United States) Jim Courier

Women's singles
- (Socialist Federal Republic of Yugoslavia) Monica Seles

Men's doubles
- (Australia) Todd Woodbridge / (Australia) Mark Woodforde

Women's doubles
- (Spain) Arantxa Sánchez Vicario / (Czechoslovakia) Helena Suková

Mixed doubles
- (Australia) Nicole Provis / (Australia) Mark Woodforde

Boys' singles
- (Australia) Grant Doyle

Girls' singles
- (Australia) Joanne Limmer

Boys' doubles
- (Australia) Grant Doyle / (Australia) Brad Sceney

Girls' doubles
- (United States) Lindsay Davenport / (United States) Nicole London
- Australian Open

The 1992 Australian Open was a tennis tournament played on outdoor hard courts at Flinders Park in Melbourne, Australia and was held from 13 through 26 January 1992. It was the 80th edition of the Australian Open and the first Grand Slam tournament of the year.

== Seniors ==
=== Men's singles ===
(United States) Jim Courier defeated (Sweden) Stefan Edberg 6–3, 3–6, 6–4, 6–2

- It was Courier's 2nd career Grand Slam title and his 1st Australian Open title.

=== Women's singles ===
(Socialist Federal Republic of Yugoslavia) Monica Seles defeated (United States) Mary Joe Fernández 6–2, 6–3

- It was Seles' 5th career Grand Slam title and her 2nd Australian Open title.

=== Men's doubles ===
(Australia) Todd Woodbridge / (Australia) Mark Woodforde defeated (United States) Kelly Jones / (United States) Rick Leach 6–4, 6–3, 6–4

- It was Woodbridge's 2nd career Grand Slam title and his 1st Australian Open title. It was Woodforde's 2nd career Grand Slam title and his 1st Australian Open title.

=== Women's doubles ===
(Spain) Arantxa Sánchez Vicario / (Czechoslovakia) Helena Suková defeated (United States) Mary Joe Fernández / (United States) Zina Garrison 6–4, 7–6 ^{(7–2)}

- It was Sánchez Vicario's 3rd career Grand Slam title and her 1st Australian Open title. It was Suková's 8th career Grand Slam title and her 2nd Australian Open title.

=== Mixed doubles ===
(Australia) Nicole Provis / (Australia) Mark Woodforde defeated (Spain) Arantxa Sánchez Vicario / (Australia) Todd Woodbridge 6–3, 4–6, 11–9

- It was Provis' 1st career Grand Slam title and her only Australian Open title. It was Woodforde's 3rd career Grand Slam title and his 2nd Australian Open title.

== Juniors ==
=== Boys' singles ===
(Australia) Grant Doyle defeated (United States) Brian Dunn 6–2, 6–0

=== Girls' singles ===
(Australia) Joanne Limmer defeated (United States) Lindsay Davenport 7–5, 6–2

=== Boys' doubles ===
(Australia) Grant Doyle / (Australia) Brad Sceney defeated (United States) Lex Carrington / (United States) Jason Thompson 6–4, 6–4

=== Girls' doubles ===
(United States) Lindsay Davenport / (United States) Nicole London defeated (Australia) Maija Avotins / (Australia) Joanne Limmer 6–2, 7–5

== Prize money ==
Event		W	F	SF	QF	4R	3R	2R	1R
Singles	Men	A$360,000	A$180,000	A$90,000	A$46,800	A$22,200	A$14,500	A$8,800	A$5,400
Singles	Women	A$360,000	A$180,000	A$90,000	A$46,800	A$22,200	A$14,500	A$8,800	A$5,400

Preceded by 1991 US Open	Grand Slams	Succeeded by 1992 French Open
