= 1994 Australian Open – Men's singles =

Men's singles
- 1994 Australian Open

Final
- Champion: (United States) Pete Sampras
- Runner-up: (United States) Todd Martin
- Score: 7–6^{(7–4)}, 6–4, 6–4

Details
- Draw: 128
- Seeds: 16

Events
Singles	men	women		boys	girls
Doubles	men	women	mixed	boys	girls
WC Singles	men	women	quad
WC Doubles	men	women	quad
Legends	men	women	mixed
- Australian Open

Pete Sampras defeated Todd Martin in the final, 7–6^{(7–4)}, 6–4, 6–4 to win the men's singles tennis title at the 1994 Australian Open. It was his first Australian Open title and fourth major title overall.

Jim Courier was the two-time defending champion, but lost in the semifinals to Sampras.

This tournament marked the first Australian Open main-draw appearance of future champion and world No. 1 Yevgeny Kafelnikov, and the first major appearance of future champion Thomas Johansson.

== Seeds ==
The seeded players are listed below. Pete Sampras is the champion; others show the round in which they were eliminated.

1. (United States) Pete Sampras (champion)
2. (Germany) Michael Stich (first round)
3. (United States) Jim Courier (semifinals)
4. (Sweden) Stefan Edberg (semifinals)
5. (Croatia) Goran Ivanišević (quarterfinals)
6. (Austria) Thomas Muster (quarterfinals)
7. (France) Cédric Pioline (first round)
8. (Czech Republic) Petr Korda (first round)
9. (United States) Todd Martin (finalist)
10. (Sweden) Magnus Gustafsson (quarterfinals)
11. (Switzerland) Marc Rosset (third round)
12. (Russia) Alexander Volkov (fourth round)
13. (South Africa) Wayne Ferreira (fourth round)
14. (Czech Republic) Karel Nováček (third round)
15. (United States) Ivan Lendl (fourth round)
16. (France) Arnaud Boetsch (second round)

== Draw ==
=== Key ===
- Q = Qualifier
- WC = Wild card
- LL = Lucky loser
- r = Retired

=== Finals ===
Quarterfinals
1	(United States) Pete Sampras	7^{7}	2	6	7^{7}
10	(Sweden) Magnus Gustafsson	6^{4}	6	3	6^{4}
3	(United States) Jim Courier	7^{9}	6	6
5	(Croatia) Goran Ivanišević	6^{7}	4	2
6	(Austria) Thomas Muster	2	3	4
4	(Sweden) Stefan Edberg	6	6	6
9	(United States) Todd Martin	6	7^{7}	7^{7}
(United States) MaliVai Washington	2	6^{4}	6^{5}

Semifinals
1	(United States) Pete Sampras	6	6	6
3	(United States) Jim Courier	3	4	4
4	(Sweden) Stefan Edberg	6	6^{7}	6^{7}	6^{4}
9	(United States) Todd Martin	3	7^{9}	7^{9}	7^{7}

Final
1	(United States) Pete Sampras	7^{7}	6	6
9	(United States) Todd Martin	6^{4}	4	4

=== Section 1 ===
First round
1	(United States) P Sampras	6	6	7^{7}
WC	(Australia) J Eagle	4	0	6^{5}
(Russia) Y Kafelnikov	4
(United States) S Bryan	5	r
(South Africa) C van Rensburg	6	3	6	4	1
(France) S Simian	1	6	4	6	6
(United States) J Palmer	6^{4}	4	6	6	8
(Germany) D Prinosil	7^{7}	6	1	1	6
Q	(South Africa) D Nainkin	2	2	4
(Netherlands) P Haarhuis	6	6	6
(United States) J Stark	7	6^{3}	7^{7}	6
(United States) T Ho	5	7^{7}	6^{1}	3
Q	(United States) B MacPhie	5	4	0
(United States) R Reneberg	7	6	6
(Canada) G Rusedski	4	6^{4}	5
15	(United States) I Lendl	6	7^{7}	7

Second round
1	(United States) P Sampras	6	2	6	1	9
(Russia) Y Kafelnikov	3	6	3	6	7
(France) S Simian	3	7^{7}	4	6	8
(United States) J Palmer	6	6^{3}	6	3	6
(Netherlands) P Haarhuis	6	6	6
(United States) J Stark	2	4	4
(United States) R Reneberg	7	2	2	2
15	(United States) I Lendl	5	6	6	6

Third round
1	(United States) P Sampras	7	6	1	6
(France) S Simian	5	1	6	4
(Netherlands) P Haarhuis	6	2	2	4
15	(United States) I Lendl	4	6	6	6

Fourth round
1	(United States) P Sampras	7^{7}	6	7^{7}
15	(United States) I Lendl	6^{5}	2	6^{4}

=== Section 2 ===
First round
10	(Sweden) M Gustafsson	3	7	6	2	6
Q	(The Bahamas) R Smith	6	5	2	6	2
(New Zealand) B Steven	6	5
(Germany) B Karbacher	2	2	r
(United States) J Tarango	5	4	1
Q	(Belgium) F Dewulf	7	6	6
(Germany) J Renzenbrink	6	6	6
(Italy) C Caratti	1	4	4
(Sweden) M Pernfors	3	4	2
(Israel) A Mansdorf	6	6	6
Q	(Japan) R Tsujino	0	5	4
WC	(Australia) B Larkham	6	7	6
Q	(United States) K Kinnear	4	0	1
(France) H Leconte	6	6	6
(Czech Republic) M Damm	7	3	7^{8}	6
7	(France) C Pioline	5	6	6^{6}	3

Second round
10	(Sweden) M Gustafsson	7^{7}	6	4	6
(New Zealand) B Steven	6^{5}	2	6	2
Q	(Belgium) F Dewulf	1	4	3
(Germany) J Renzenbrink	6	6	6
(Israel) A Mansdorf	5	6^{4}	4
WC	(Australia) B Larkham	7	7^{7}	6
(France) H Leconte	6	6^{1}	4	2	r
(Czech Republic) M Damm	1	7^{7}	6	4

Third round
10	(Sweden) M Gustafsson	6	6	6
(Germany) J Renzenbrink	2	2	2
WC	(Australia) B Larkham	4	4	6	2
(Czech Republic) M Damm	6	6	3	6

Fourth round
10	(Sweden) M Gustafsson	2	6	6	6
(Czech Republic) M Damm	6	3	1	1

=== Section 3 ===
First round
3	(United States) J Courier	4	6	6^{4}	6	6
(United States) B Shelton	6	1	7^{7}	2	4
(Italy) G Pozzi	3	1	3
(South Africa) M Ondruska	6	6	6
(France) J-P Fleurian	4	2	5
(Sweden) N Kulti	6	6	7
(Canada) S Lareau	3	6	5	6	2
WC	(Australia) S Stolle	6	3	7	3	6
(Czech Republic) D Vacek	6	1
(Sweden) C Bergström	3	1	r
(Germany) K Braasch	4	2	0
(Italy) A Gaudenzi	6	6	6
(Czech Republic) D Rikl	1	7^{7}	6	6
(Sweden) M Larsson	6	6^{4}	3	0
(Brazil) F Meligeni	4	3	6^{8}
13	(South Africa) W Ferreira	6	6	7^{10}

Second round
3	(United States) J Courier	6	6	6
(South Africa) M Ondruska	1	4	4
(Sweden) N Kulti	6	6	6
WC	(Australia) S Stolle	4	2	1
(Czech Republic) D Vacek	6	6	6
(Italy) A Gaudenzi	3	2	2
(Czech Republic) D Rikl	3	4	2
13	(South Africa) W Ferreira	6	6	6

Third round
3	(United States) J Courier	6	6	7^{7}
(Sweden) N Kulti	3	3	6^{1}
(Czech Republic) D Vacek	6	2	6^{4}	4
13	(South Africa) W Ferreira	4	6	7^{7}	6

Fourth round
3	(United States) J Courier	6	6	6
13	(South Africa) W Ferreira	3	4	2

=== Section 4 ===
First round
11	(Switzerland) M Rosset	6	7^{8}	6
(United Kingdom) C Wilkinson	2	6^{6}	3
(Switzerland) J Hlasek	7	4	6	6
LL	(The Bahamas) M Knowles	5	6	3	4
(Spain) T Carbonell	6	1	4	3
(Spain) E Sánchez	2	6	6	6
(South Africa) G Stafford	6	6	6
WC	(Australia) M Philippoussis	2	2	0
Q	(Australia) A Kratzmann	4	6	1	5
Q	(Sweden) T Nydahl	6	3	6	7
(United States) A Krickstein	6	2	7^{7}	6
(Italy) R Furlan	3	6	6^{4}	3
(Venezuela) M Ruah	3	3	3
(Australia) J Stoltenberg	6	6	6
(United States) A O'Brien	1	0	2
5	(Croatia) G Ivanišević	6	6	6

Second round
11	(Switzerland) M Rosset	6	7^{7}	3	6
(Switzerland) J Hlasek	4	6^{4}	6	2
(Spain) E Sánchez	1	2	2
(South Africa) G Stafford	6	6	6
Q	(Sweden) T Nydahl	6^{3}	1	7^{7}	2
(United States) A Krickstein	7^{7}	6	6^{5}	6
(Australia) J Stoltenberg	6	3	4	3
5	(Croatia) G Ivanišević	3	6	6	6

Third round
11	(Switzerland) M Rosset	6	2	2	1
(South Africa) G Stafford	3	6	6	6
(United States) A Krickstein	6	5	3	4
5	(Croatia) G Ivanišević	3	7	6	6

Fourth round
(South Africa) G Stafford	3	2	6^{3}
5	(Croatia) G Ivanišević	6	6	7^{7}

=== Section 5 ===
First round
6	(Austria) T Muster	6	6	6
(United States) R Weiss	3	3	3
(Denmark) K Carlsen	6	3	6	3	8
WC	(Australia) D Cahill	4	6	3	6	6
(Germany) M Naewie	6	2	2	0
(France) G Raoux	4	6	6	6
(Germany) P Kühnen	6^{3}	7^{7}	6	6
(Russia) A Olhovskiy	7^{7}	6^{1}	2	4
(Australia) T Woodbridge	6^{4}	4	7^{7}	6	6
Q	(United States) J Sullivan	7^{7}	6	6^{5}	4	3
Q	(Germany) H Dreekmann	5	4	4
(Sweden) H Holm	7	6	6
(Australia) R Fromberg	1	7^{7}	6	6
(United States) P McEnroe	6	6^{4}	3	4
(Australia) W Masur	4	4	2
12	(Russia) A Volkov	6	6	6

Second round
6	(Austria) T Muster	6	6	6
(Denmark) K Carlsen	4	4	2
(France) G Raoux	6	7	6
(Germany) P Kühnen	2	5	4
(Australia) T Woodbridge	4	6^{8}	7	6	5
(Sweden) H Holm	6	7^{10}	5	4	7
(Australia) R Fromberg	6^{7}	3	3
12	(Russia) A Volkov	7^{9}	6	6

Third round
6	(Austria) T Muster	6	6	6
(France) G Raoux	3	3	2
(Sweden) H Holm	5	6	6	3	4
12	(Russia) A Volkov	7	2	4	6	6

Fourth round
6	(Austria) T Muster	6	6	6
12	(Russia) A Volkov	3	3	2

=== Section 6 ===
First round
14	(Czech Republic) K Nováček	6	4	6	6
(Argentina) D Orsanic	3	6	1	4
(Sweden) A Järryd	6	4	0	0	r
Q	(Sweden) L-A Wahlgren	0	6	6	1
(Zimbabwe) B Black	3	5	4
(Sweden) L Jönsson	6	7	6
(Australia) N Borwick	1	2	r
(Morocco) Y El Aynaoui	6	6
(France) R Gilbert	5	7	6	6
(Spain) J Burillo	7	5	3	1
(Ukraine) D Poliakov	2	3	2
(France) F Santoro	6	6	6
(Netherlands) J Siemerink	6	7^{7}	4	6
Q	(Germany) M Zoecke	3	6^{4}	6	3
(Spain) J Sánchez	3	0	3
4	(Sweden) S Edberg	6	6	6

Second round
14	(Czech Republic) K Nováček	6	7^{13}	7^{9}
Q	(Sweden) L-A Wahlgren	4	6^{11}	6^{7}
(Sweden) L Jönsson	7^{7}	6^{3}	6	6
(Morocco) Y El Aynaoui	6^{5}	7^{7}	1	3
(France) R Gilbert	5	7	6	5	0
(France) F Santoro	7	5	2	7	6
(Netherlands) J Siemerink	6	2	1	1
4	(Sweden) S Edberg	4	6	6	6

Third round
14	(Czech Republic) K Nováček	1	5	5
(Sweden) L Jönsson	6	7	7
(France) F Santoro	2	1	1
4	(Sweden) S Edberg	6	6	6

Fourth round
(Sweden) L Jönsson	4	4	4
4	(Sweden) S Edberg	6	6	6

=== Section 7 ===
First round
8	(Czech Republic) P Korda	3	4	6^{2}
(Sweden) T Enqvist	6	6	7^{7}
Q	(Sweden) T Johansson	7^{7}	2	5	3
(Belgium) X Daufresne	6^{5}	6	7	6
Q	(Kenya) P Wekesa	1	6	1	2
(Australia) P Rafter	6	3	6	6
LL	(United States) C Garner	4	4	4
(Netherlands) J Eltingh	6	6	6
(Italy) S Pescosolido	6	6	6
(United States) D Flach	4	3	1
(Sweden) J Svensson	5	7^{7}	6	6
WC	(Australia) M Tebbutt	7	6^{4}	0	3
(Sweden) J Björkman	3	6	6^{3}	7	6
Q	(United States) K Thorne	6	4	7^{7}	5	2
(Peru) J Yzaga	3	6^{3}	2
9	(United States) T Martin	6	7^{7}	6

Second round
(Sweden) T Enqvist	3	2	6^{7}
(Belgium) X Daufresne	6	6	7^{9}
(Australia) P Rafter	6	6	6
(Netherlands) J Eltingh	4	4	4
(Italy) S Pescosolido	2	5	5
(Sweden) J Svensson	6	7	7
(Sweden) J Björkman	3	4	0
9	(United States) T Martin	6	6	6

Third round
(Belgium) X Daufresne	5	6	6	6
(Australia) P Rafter	7	2	1	4
(Sweden) J Svensson	1	7	2	2
9	(United States) T Martin	6	5	6	6

Fourth round
(Belgium) X Daufresne	7^{7}	6^{5}	3	3
9	(United States) T Martin	6^{3}	7^{7}	6	6

=== Section 8 ===
First round
16	(France) A Boetsch	6	6	6
Q	(United States) R Blake	2	4	0
(Germany) A Mronz	6	6	6
WC	(Australia) P Kilderry	1	2	4
(France) O Delaître	6	6	4	6
(Italy) D Nargiso	4	2	6	2
WC	(Sweden) M Wilander	6	4	6	6
(Bulgaria) M Velev	1	6	0	0
(Austria) A Antonitsch	4	7^{7}	7^{7}	6
(Japan) S Matsuoka	6	6^{4}	6^{2}	4
(Russia) A Chesnokov	3	7^{9}	6^{5}	6	4
(Australia) J Morgan	6	6^{7}	7^{7}	4	6
(Russia) A Cherkasov	6	2	6	7
(Australia) M Woodforde	1	6	1	5
(United States) M Washington	7^{7}	6	3	6
2	(Germany) M Stich	6^{4}	3	6	2

Second round
16	(France) A Boetsch	w/o
(Germany) A Mronz
(France) O Delaître	1	6	5	4
WC	(Sweden) M Wilander	6	2	7	6
(Austria) A Antonitsch	7	1
(Australia) J Morgan	5	0	r
(Russia) A Cherkasov	4	6	2	6	2
(United States) M Washington	6	2	6	3	6

Third round
(Germany) A Mronz	6	7	3	4	3
WC	(Sweden) M Wilander	4	5	6	6	6
(Austria) A Antonitsch	6	6^{7}	3	3
(United States) M Washington	4	7^{9}	6	6

Fourth round
WC	(Sweden) M Wilander	7^{9}	2	7^{7}	4	1
(United States) M Washington	6^{7}	6	6^{3}	6	6

Preceded by 1993 US Open – Men's singles	Grand Slam men's singles	Succeeded by 1994 French Open – Men's singles
