= 1992 Australian Open – Mixed doubles =

Mixed doubles
- 1992 Australian Open

Final
- Champions: (Australia) Nicole Provis (Australia) Mark Woodforde
- Runners-up: (Spain) Arantxa Sánchez Vicario (Australia) Todd Woodbridge
- Score: 6–3, 4–6, 11–9

Details
- Draw: 32
- Seeds: 8

Events
Singles	men	women		boys	girls
Doubles	men	women	mixed	boys	girls
WC Singles	men	women	quad
WC Doubles	men	women	quad
Legends	men	women	mixed
- Australian Open

Jo Durie and Jeremy Bates were the defending champions but lost in the quarterfinals to Robin White and Scott Davis.

Nicole Provis and Mark Woodforde won in the final 6–3, 4–6, 11–9 against Arantxa Sánchez Vicario and Todd Woodbridge.

== Seeds ==
Champion seeds are indicated in bold text while text in italics indicates the round in which those seeds were eliminated.

1. (Spain) Arantxa Sánchez Vicario / (Australia) Todd Woodbridge (final)
2. (Canada) Jill Hetherington / (Canada) Glenn Michibata (first round)
3. (Australia) **Nicole Provis** / (Australia) **Mark Woodforde (champions)**
4. (Commonwealth of Independent States) Natasha Zvereva / (United States) Jim Pugh (quarterfinals)
5. (United States) Robin White / (United States) Scott Davis (semifinals)
6. (Argentina) Mercedes Paz / (Mexico) Leonardo Lavalle (first round)
7. (Netherlands) Manon Bollegraf / (Netherlands) Tom Nijssen (second round)
8. (Latvia) Larisa Neiland / (United States) Sven Salumaa (second round)

== Draw ==
Key

- Q = Qualifier
- WC = Wild card
- LL = Lucky loser
- Alt = Alternate
- ITF = ITF entry
- PR = Protected ranking
- SR = Special ranking
- SE = Special exempt
- JE = Junior exempt
- JR = Junior Accelerator Programme entrant
- CO = College Accelerator Programme entrant
- NG = Next Gen Accelerator Program entrant
- w/o = Walkover
- r = Retired
- d = Defaulted

=== Final ===
Final
1	(Spain) Arantxa Sánchez Vicario (Australia) Todd Woodbridge	3	**6**	9
3	(Australia) **Nicole Provis** (Australia) **Mark Woodforde**	**6**	4	**11**

=== Top half ===
First round
1	(Spain) **A Sánchez Vicario** (Australia) **T Woodbridge**	**6**	**6**
(Canada) R Simpson-Alter (Canada) G Connell	0	2
(United States) P Fendick (United States) S DeVries	4	6^{3}
(Netherlands) **B Schultz** (Czechoslovakia) **C Suk**	**6**	**7^{7}**
(United States) **S Rehe** (Croatia) **G Ivanišević**	5	**6**	**6**
(South Africa) L Gregory (South Africa) P Aldrich	**7**	2	1
(Belgium) S Appelmans (Sweden) R Bergh	5	**6**	4
7	(Netherlands) **M Bollegraf** (Netherlands) **T Nijssen**	**7**	3	**6**
6	(Argentina) M Paz (Mexico) L Lavalle	**6**	6^{5}	2
(United States) **G Helgeson** (United States) **P Galbraith**	4	**7^{7}**	**6**
WC	(Australia) A Minter (Australia) S Youl	2	5
(Australia) **R McQuillan** (Australia) **D Macpherson**	**6**	**7**
(South Africa) **R Fairbank-Nideffer** (United States) **K Kinnear**	**7^{7}**	**6**
(United States) S Stafford (United States) R Leach	6^{2}	3
(Australia) R Stubbs (South Africa) D Visser	**7**	4	7
4	(Commonwealth of Independent States) **N Zvereva** (United States) **J Pugh**	5	**6**	**9**

Second round
1	(Spain) **A Sánchez Vicario** (Australia) **T Woodbridge**	**6**	4	**6**
(Netherlands) B Schultz (Czechoslovakia) C Suk	1	**6**	4
(United States) **S Rehe** (Croatia) **G Ivanišević**	3	**6**	**8**
7	(Netherlands) M Bollegraf (Netherlands) T Nijssen	**6**	3	6
(United States) G Helgeson (United States) P Galbraith	2	**6**	3
(Australia) **R McQuillan** (Australia) **D Macpherson**	**6**	4	**6**
(South Africa) R Fairbank-Nideffer (United States) K Kinnear	6^{3}	5
4	(Commonwealth of Independent States) **N Zvereva** (United States) **J Pugh**	**7^{7}**	**7**

Quarterfinals
1	(Spain) **A Sánchez Vicario** (Australia) **T Woodbridge**	**6**	**6**
(United States) S Rehe (Croatia) G Ivanišević	2	3
(Australia) **R McQuillan** (Australia) **D Macpherson**	6^{1}	**6**	**6**
4	(Commonwealth of Independent States) N Zvereva (United States) J Pugh	**7^{7}**	2	2

Semifinals
1	(Spain) **A Sánchez Vicario** (Australia) **T Woodbridge**	**6**	**7^{7}**
(Australia) R McQuillan (Australia) D Macpherson	3	6^{4}

=== Bottom half ===
First round
3	(Australia) **N Provis** (Australia) **M Woodforde**	**6**	**7^{7}**
(United States) L McNeil (United States) P Annacone	4	6^{4}
(United States) **K Adams** (United States) **G Van Emburgh**	**6**	4	**6**
(United Kingdom) C Wood (Australia) L Warder	2	**6**	4
(Peru) L Gildemeister (Argentina) J Frana	6^{1}	2
(United States) **P Shriver** (Australia) **M Kratzmann**	**7^{7}**	**6**
(United States) M L Daniels (South Africa) P Norval	4	2
8	(Latvia) **L Neiland** (United States) **S Salumaa**	**6**	**6**
5	(United States) **R White** (United States) **S Davis**	**6**	**6**
(France) C Tanvier (Czechoslovakia) D Vacek	4	3
(United States) **C Cunningham** (United States) **L Jensen**	**7**	**6**
(France) I Demongeot (United States) C Beckman	5	2
WC	(Australia) K Godridge (Australia) J Morgan	6^{4}	3
(United Kingdom) **J Durie** (United Kingdom) **J Bates**	**7^{7}**	**6**
(Australia) **J-A Faull** (United Kingdom) **N Broad**	**6**	5	**6**
2	(Canada) J Hetherington (Canada) G Michibata	4	**7**	4

Second round
3	(Australia) **N Provis** (Australia) **M Woodforde**	**6**	**6**
(United States) K Adams (United States) G Van Emburgh	3	3
(United States) **P Shriver** (Australia) **M Kratzmann**	6^{4}	**6**	**6**
8	(Latvia) L Neiland (United States) S Salumaa	**7^{7}**	3	2
5	(United States) **R White** (United States) **S Davis**	**6**	6^{2}	**6**
(United States) C Cunningham (United States) L Jensen	2	**7^{7}**	3
(United Kingdom) **J Durie** (United Kingdom) **J Bates**	**7^{7}**	**6**
(Australia) J-A Faull (United Kingdom) N Broad	6^{2}	4

Quarterfinals
3	(Australia) **N Provis** (Australia) **M Woodforde**	**6**	**7^{7}**
(United States) P Shriver (Australia) M Kratzmann	4	6^{0}
5	(United States) **R White** (United States) **S Davis**	**6**	**7^{7}**
(United Kingdom) J Durie (United Kingdom) J Bates	3	6^{2}

Semifinals
3	(Australia) **N Provis** (Australia) **M Woodforde**	**6**	**6**
5	(United States) R White (United States) S Davis	2	1
