= 1994 Australian Open – Men's doubles =

Tennis tournament

Men's doubles
- 1994 Australian Open

Final
- Champions: (Netherlands) Jacco Eltingh (Netherlands) Paul Haarhuis
- Runners-up: (Zimbabwe) Byron Black (United States) Jonathan Stark
- Score: 6–7^{(3–7)}, 6–3, 6–4, 6–3

Details
- Draw: 64
- Seeds: 16

Events
Singles	men	women		boys	girls
Doubles	men	women	mixed	boys	girls
WC Singles	men	women	quad
WC Doubles	men	women	quad
Legends	men	women	mixed
- Australian Open

Danie Visser and Laurie Warder were the defending champions, but they did not compete together this year. Visser participated alongside Jim Grabb and was defeated in the first round by Sergio Casal and Emilio Sánchez. At the same time, Warder participated alongside Brett Steven and was defeated in the first round by Goran Ivanišević and Marc Rosset.

Jacco Eltingh and Paul Haarhuis won the title, defeating Byron Black and Jonathan Stark in the final. This was the first final and Grand Slam victory for the Dutch pair, who would go on to complete a Career Grand Slam.

== Seeds ==
1. (Canada) Grant Connell / (United States) Patrick Galbraith (first round)
2. (Zimbabwe) Byron Black / (United States) Jonathan Stark (final)
3. (Netherlands) Jacco Eltingh / (Netherlands) Paul Haarhuis (champions)
4. (Australia) Todd Woodbridge / (Australia) Mark Woodforde (quarterfinals)
5. (United States) Luke Jensen / (United States) Murphy Jensen (second round)
6. (United States) Patrick McEnroe / (United States) Richey Reneberg (first round)
7. (Netherlands) Tom Nijssen / (Czech Republic) Cyril Suk (quarterfinals)
8. (United States) Scott Melville / (South Africa) Gary Muller (first round)
9. (South Africa) David Adams / (Russia) Andrei Olhovskiy (third round)
10. (United States) Ken Flach / (United States) Rick Leach (quarterfinals)
11. (Spain) Sergio Casal / (Spain) Emilio Sánchez (second round)
12. (Sweden) Henrik Holm / (Sweden) Anders Järryd (third round)
13. (Sweden) Stefan Edberg / (Czech Republic) Petr Korda (third round)
14. (Netherlands) Hendrik Jan Davids / (South Africa) Pieter Norval (third round)
15. (United States) Brad Pearce / (United States) Dave Randall (second round)
16. (South Africa) Wayne Ferreira / (Spain) Javier Sánchez (first round)

== Draw ==
Key

- Q = Qualifier
- WC = Wild card
- LL = Lucky loser
- Alt = Alternate
- ITF = ITF entry
- PR = Protected ranking
- SR = Special ranking
- SE = Special exempt
- JE = Junior exempt
- JR = Junior Accelerator Programme entrant
- CO = College Accelerator Programme entrant
- NG = Next Gen Accelerator Program entrant
- w/o = Walkover
- r = Retired
- d = Defaulted

=== Finals ===
Quarterfinals
(Czech Republic) Martin Damm (Czech Republic) Karel Nováček	6	4	6	6
10	(United States) Ken Flach (United States) Rick Leach	4	6	4	3
3	(Netherlands) Jacco Eltingh (Netherlands) Paul Haarhuis	6	7	3	4	7
(Canada) Sébastien Lareau (Canada) Daniel Nestor	4	5	6	6	5
(Sweden) Jan Apell (Sweden) Jonas Björkman	6	6	6
4	(Australia) Todd Woodbridge (Australia) Mark Woodforde	4	2	4
7	(Netherlands) Tom Nijssen (Czech Republic) Cyril Suk	3	4	4
2	(Zimbabwe) Byron Black (United States) Jonathan Stark	6	6	6

Semifinals
(Czech Republic) Martin Damm (Czech Republic) Karel Nováček	1	4	2
3	(Netherlands) Jacco Eltingh (Netherlands) Paul Haarhuis	6	6	6
(Sweden) Jan Apell (Sweden) Jonas Björkman	1	4	4
2	(Zimbabwe) Byron Black (United States) Jonathan Stark	6	6	6

Final
3	(Netherlands) Jacco Eltingh (Netherlands) Paul Haarhuis	6^{3}	6	6	6
2	(Zimbabwe) Byron Black (United States) Jonathan Stark	7^{7}	3	4	3

=== Top half ===
==== Section 1 ====
First round
1	(Canada) G Connell (United States) P Galbraith	7^{8}	4	4
(Australia) A Kratzmann (Australia) M Kratzmann	6^{6}	6	6
(United States) K Kinnear (United States) K Thorne	0	6^{3}
(Netherlands) J Siemerink (Czech Republic) D Vacek	6	7^{7}
(Czech Republic) D Rikl (Venezuela) M Ruah	6	3	1
(Czech Republic) M Damm (Czech Republic) K Nováček	3	6	6
(United States) S Cannon (South Africa) B Talbot	2	2
15	(United States) B Pearce (United States) D Randall	6	6
10	(United States) K Flach (United States) R Leach	7	6
(United States) M Bauer (Germany) D Prinosil	5	4
(Italy) C Brandi (Spain) T Carbonell	2	6	8
(United States) B Devening (United States) A O'Brien	6	3	6
WC	(Australia) P Kilderry (Australia) M Tebbutt	7	6
(United States) B Garnett (United States) TJ Middleton	5	4
(United States) D Johnson (United States) J Sullivan	6	6
8	(United States) S Melville (South Africa) G Muller	3	4

Second round
(Australia) A Kratzmann (Australia) M Kratzmann	6	7
(Netherlands) J Siemerink (Czech Republic) D Vacek	4	5
(Czech Republic) M Damm (Czech Republic) K Nováček	6	6
15	(United States) B Pearce (United States) D Randall	3	2
10	(United States) K Flach (United States) R Leach	6	6
(Italy) C Brandi (Spain) T Carbonell	2	3
WC	(Australia) P Kilderry (Australia) M Tebbutt	7^{7}	7^{11}
(United States) D Johnson (United States) J Sullivan	6^{2}	6^{9}

Third round
(Australia) A Kratzmann (Australia) M Kratzmann	2	4
(Czech Republic) M Damm (Czech Republic) K Nováček	6	6
10	(United States) K Flach (United States) R Leach	7	6^{2}	8
WC	(Australia) P Kilderry (Australia) M Tebbutt	5	7^{7}	6

Quarterfinals
(Czech Republic) M Damm (Czech Republic) K Nováček	6	4	6	6
10	(United States) K Flach (United States) R Leach	4	6	4	3

==== Section 2 ====
First round
3	(Netherlands) J Eltingh (Netherlands) P Haarhuis	6	6
(Czech Republic) V Flégl (France) J-P Fleurian	3	3
(United States) K Jones (United States) M Keil	6	5	6
(The Bahamas) M Knowles (United States) J Palmer	1	7	4
(United States) S DeVries (Australia) D Macpherson	6	6
(Netherlands) T Kempers (Netherlands) M Oosting	1	4
(France) O Delaître (France) S Simian	3	7	4
13	(Sweden) S Edberg (Czech Republic) P Korda	6	5	6
11	(Spain) S Casal (Spain) E Sánchez	6	7^{7}
(United States) J Grabb (South Africa) D Visser	2	6^{4}
(Canada) S Lareau (Canada) D Nestor	4	6	6
(South Africa) M Ondruska (South Africa) G Stafford	6	3	4
(Belgium) L Pimek (United States) G Van Emburgh	7^{7}	6
(Russia) Y Kafelnikov (Italy) D Nargiso	6^{5}	4
(United States) T Martin (United States) B Shelton	7^{7}	4	15
6	(United States) P McEnroe (United States) R Reneberg	6^{5}	6	13

Second round
3	(Netherlands) J Eltingh (Netherlands) P Haarhuis	7^{7}	6
(United States) K Jones (United States) M Keil	6^{4}	2
(United States) S DeVries (Australia) D Macpherson	4	4
13	(Sweden) S Edberg (Czech Republic) P Korda	6	6
11	(Spain) S Casal (Spain) E Sánchez	4	4
(Canada) S Lareau (Canada) D Nestor	6	6
(Belgium) L Pimek (United States) G Van Emburgh	6	3	6
(United States) T Martin (United States) B Shelton	4	6	3

Third round
3	(Netherlands) J Eltingh (Netherlands) P Haarhuis	5	7^{7}	6
13	(Sweden) S Edberg (Czech Republic) P Korda	7	6^{5}	2
(Canada) S Lareau (Canada) D Nestor	7	6
(Belgium) L Pimek (United States) G Van Emburgh	5	3

Quarterfinals
3	(Netherlands) J Eltingh (Netherlands) P Haarhuis	6	7	3	4	7
(Canada) S Lareau (Canada) D Nestor	4	5	6	6	5

=== Bottom half ===
==== Section 3 ====
First round
5	(United States) L Jensen (United States) M Jensen	6	6
(Germany) P Kühnen (Germany) M Stich	4	3
WC	(Australia) B Larkham (Australia) P Tramacchi	2	4
(Sweden) J Apell (Sweden) J Björkman	6	6
(Argentina) P Albano (Mexico) L Lavalle	3	4
(Switzerland) J Hlasek (United States) W Masur	6	6
WC	(Australia) R Fromberg (Australia) S Stolle	3	2
12	(Sweden) H Holm (Sweden) A Järryd	6	6
14	(Netherlands) HJ Davids (South Africa) P Norval	5	7	6
WC	(Australia) N Borwick (Australia) S Youl	7	5	4
(New Zealand) B Steven (Australia) L Warder	6^{4}	6	2
(Croatia) G Ivanišević (Switzerland) M Rosset	7^{7}	4	6
WC	(Australia) J Eagle (Australia) A Florent	6	3	6
(Australia) D Cahill (Australia) J Fitzgerald	3	6	4
(South Africa) S Kruger (Zimbabwe) K Ullyett	3	3
4	(Australia) T Woodbridge (Australia) M Woodforde	6	6

Second round
5	(United States) L Jensen (United States) M Jensen	7^{7}	3	6
(Sweden) J Apell (Sweden) J Björkman	6^{5}	6	8
(Switzerland) J Hlasek (United States) W Masur	3	3
12	(Sweden) H Holm (Sweden) A Järryd	6	6
14	(Netherlands) HJ Davids (South Africa) P Norval	w/o
(Croatia) G Ivanišević (Switzerland) M Rosset
WC	(Australia) J Eagle (Australia) A Florent	4	5
4	(Australia) T Woodbridge (Australia) M Woodforde	6	7

Third round
(Sweden) J Apell (Sweden) J Björkman	7^{7}	6
12	(Sweden) H Holm (Sweden) A Järryd	6^{4}	3
14	(Netherlands) HJ Davids (South Africa) P Norval	3	2
4	(Australia) T Woodbridge (Australia) M Woodforde	6	6

Quarterfinals
(Sweden) J Apell (Sweden) J Björkman	6	6	6
4	(Australia) T Woodbridge (Australia) M Woodforde	4	2	4

==== Section 4 ====
First round
7	(Netherlands) T Nijssen (Czech Republic) C Suk	4	6	9
(Mexico) J Lozano (United States) J Pugh	6	4	7
WC	(Australia) H Denman (Australia) G Doyle	7^{7}	6^{5}	7
(United Kingdom) N Broad (South Africa) R Deppe	6^{2}	7^{7}	5
WC	(Australia) J Morgan (Australia) M Philippoussis	4	4
(United States) M Briggs (United States) B MacPhie	6	6
(United States) P Annacone (United States) D Flach	2	6	1
9	(South Africa) D Adams (Russia) A Olhovskiy	6	4	6
16	(South Africa) W Ferreira (Spain) J Sánchez	4	6^{4}
(South Africa) J de Beer (South Africa) J-L de Jager	6	7^{7}
(United States) S Davis (United States) D Pate	6	4	3
(South Africa) E Ferreira (South Africa) C van Rensburg	4	6	6
(India) L Paes (Sweden) M Renström	7^{7}	6
(Australia) P Rafter (Australia) J Stoltenberg	6^{3}	1
(Germany) A Mronz (Sweden) L-A Wahlgren	3	2
2	(Zimbabwe) B Black (United States) J Stark	6	6

Second round
7	(Netherlands) T Nijssen (Czech Republic) C Suk	4	6	6
WC	(Australia) H Denman (Australia) G Doyle	6	1	4
(United States) M Briggs (United States) B MacPhie	7^{7}	4	11
9	(South Africa) D Adams (Russia) A Olhovskiy	6^{4}	6	13
(South Africa) J de Beer (South Africa) J-L de Jager	6^{3}	6^{2}
(South Africa) E Ferreira (South Africa) C van Rensburg	7^{7}	7^{7}
(India) L Paes (Sweden) M Renström	4	1
2	(Zimbabwe) B Black (United States) J Stark	6	6

Third round
7	(Netherlands) T Nijssen (Czech Republic) C Suk	3	6	6
9	(South Africa) D Adams (Russia) A Olhovskiy	6	2	4
(South Africa) E Ferreira (South Africa) C van Rensburg	4	6^{4}
2	(Zimbabwe) B Black (United States) J Stark	6	7^{7}

Quarterfinals
7	(Netherlands) T Nijssen (Czech Republic) C Suk	3	4	4
2	(Zimbabwe) B Black (United States) J Stark	6	6	6
