= 1992 US Open – Mixed doubles =

Mixed doubles
- 1992 US Open

Final
- Champions: (Australia) Nicole Provis (Australia) Mark Woodforde
- Runners-up: (Czechoslovakia) Helena Suková (Netherlands) Tom Nijssen
- Score: 4–6, 6–3, 6–3

Details
- Draw: 32
- Seeds: 8

Events
Singles	men	women		boys	girls
Doubles	men	women	mixed	boys	girls
WC Singles	men	women	quad
WC Doubles	men	women	quad
Legends	men	women	mixed
- US Open

Manon Bollegraf and Tom Nijssen were the defending champions but only Nijssen competed that year with Helena Suková.

Suková and Nijssen lost in the final 4–6, 6–3, 6–3 against Nicole Provis and Mark Woodforde.

== Seeds ==
Champion seeds are indicated in bold text while text in italics indicates the round in which those seeds were eliminated.

1. (Spain) Arantxa Sánchez Vicario / (Australia) Todd Woodbridge (second round)
2. (United States) Gigi Fernández / (United States) Kelly Jones (first round)
3. (Latvia) Larisa Neiland / (Czechoslovakia) Cyril Suk (first round)
4. (United States) Zina Garrison / (United States) Rick Leach (quarterfinals)
5. (Czechoslovakia) Helena Suková / (Netherlands) Tom Nijssen (final)
6. (Australia) **Nicole Provis** / (Australia) **Mark Woodforde (champions)**
7. (South Africa) Elna Reinach / (United States) Patrick Galbraith (semifinals)
8. (Australia) Rachel McQuillan / (Australia) David Macpherson (second round)

== Draw ==
Key

- Q = Qualifier
- WC = Wild card
- LL = Lucky loser
- Alt = Alternate
- ITF = ITF entry
- PR = Protected ranking
- SR = Special ranking
- SE = Special exempt
- JE = Junior exempt
- JR = Junior Accelerator Programme entrant
- CO = College Accelerator Programme entrant
- NG = Next Gen Accelerator Program entrant
- w/o = Walkover
- r = Retired
- d = Defaulted

=== Final ===
Final
6	(Australia) **Nicole Provis** (Australia) **Mark Woodforde**	4	**6**	**6**
5	(Czechoslovakia) Helena Suková (Netherlands) Tom Nijssen	**6**	3	3

=== Top half ===
First round
1	(Spain) **A Sánchez Vicairo** (Australia) **T Woodbridge**	**6**	**6**
LL	(Australia) J-A Faull (United States) S Salumaa	1	3
(United States) **P Fendick** (United States) **S DeVries**	**6**	**6**
(Commonwealth of Independent States) L Meskhi (Belgium) L Pimek	2	3
(France) A Dechaume (Netherlands) J Eltingh	2	3
(South Africa) **A Coetzer** (South Africa) **D Adams**	**6**	**6**
(United States) R Fairbank-Nideffer (United States) G Van Emburgh	3	6^{3}
7	(South Africa) **E Reinach** (United States) **P Galbraith**	**6**	**7^{7}**
3	(Latvia) L Neiland (Czechoslovakia) C Suk	3	6^{6}
(Netherlands) **B Schultz** (United States) **L Jensen**	**6**	**7^{8}**
WC	(United States) **L McNeil** (United States) **B Shelton**	**6**	3	**6**
(United Kingdom) J Durie (Australia) L Warder	4	**6**	2
(France) **I Demongeot** (South Africa) **B Talbot**	**6**	**6**
(Japan) N Miyagi (Commonwealth of Independent States) A Olhovskiy	3	4
(Argentina) M Paz (Mexico) L Lavalle	**7**	4	3
6	(Australia) **N Provis** (Australia) **M Woodforde**	5	**6**	**6**

Second round
1	(Spain) A Sánchez Vicario (Australia) T Woodbridge	6^{2}	4
(United States) **P Fendick** (United States) **S DeVries**	**7^{7}**	**6**
(South Africa) A Coetzer (South Africa) D Adams	3	4
7	(South Africa) **E Reinach** (United States) **P Galbraith**	**6**	**6**
(Netherlands) B Schultz (United States) L Jensen	4	**7**	3
WC	(United States) **L McNeil** (United States) **B Shelton**	**6**	5	**6**
(France) I Demongeot (South Africa) B Talbot	**7^{7}**	3	2
6	(Australia) **N Provis** (Australia) **M Woodforde**	6^{5}	**6**	**6**

Quarterfinals
(United States) P Fendick (United States) S DeVries	4	3
7	(South Africa) **E Reinach** (United States) **P Galbraith**	**6**	**6**
WC	(United States) L McNeil (United States) B Shelton	6^{4}	3
6	(Australia) **N Provis** (Australia) **M Woodforde**	**7^{7}**	**6**

Semifinals
7	(South Africa) E Reinach (United States) P Galbraith	0	3
6	(Australia) **N Provis** (Australia) **M Woodforde**	**6**	**6**

=== Bottom half ===
First round
5	(Czechoslovakia) **H Suková** (Netherlands) **T Nijssen**	**6**	**7**
(Argentina) P Tarabini (Sweden) R Båthman	0	5
(Czechoslovakia) A Strnadová (Australia) M Kratzmann	0	5
WC	(United States) **L Davenport** (United States) **B Dunn**	**6**	**7**
(United States) **S Collins** (United States) **S Cannon**	**6**	**6**
WC	(United States) G Magers (United States) K Kinnear	2	2
(United States) R White (South Africa) D Visser	6^{4}	3
4	(United States) **Z Garrison** (United States) **R Leach**	**7^{7}**	**6**
8	(Australia) **R McQuillan** (Australia) **D Macpherson**	**6**	**7^{7}**
(United States) P Shriver (United States) J Pugh	3	6^{3}
WC	(United States) **G Helgeson** (United States) **T Kronemann**	**6**	1
(Australia) E Smylie (Australia) J Fitzgerald	3	1	r
(United States) P Louie-Harper (United States) M Briggs	2	4
(Commonwealth of Independent States) **N Medvedeva** (Netherlands) **H J Davids**	**6**	**6**
(Canada) **J Hetherington** (Canada) **G Michibata**	**7^{7}**	**7**
2	(United States) G Fernández (United States) K Jones	6^{5}	5

Second round
5	(Czechoslovakia) **H Suková** (Netherlands) **T Nijssen**	**6**	**6**
WC	(United States) L Davenport (United States) B Dunn	2	2
(United States) S Collins (United States) S Cannon	3	3
4	(United States) **Z Garrison** (United States) **R Leach**	**6**	**6**
8	(Australia) R McQuillan (Australia) D Macpherson	**7^{7}**	3	2
WC	(United States) **G Helgeson** (United States) **T Kronemann**	6^{3}	**6**	**6**
(Commonwealth of Independent States) N Medvedeva (Netherlands) H J Davids	2	3
(Canada) **J Hetherington** (Canada) **G Michibata**	**6**	**6**

Quarterfinals
5	(Czechoslovakia) **H Suková** (Netherlands) **T Nijssen**	**6**	**6**
4	(United States) Z Garrison (United States) R Leach	4	4
WC	(United States) G Helgeson (United States) T Kronemann	4	**6**	1
(Canada) **J Hetherington** (Canada) **G Michibata**	**6**	2	**6**

Semifinals
5	(Czechoslovakia) **H Suková** (Netherlands) **T Nijssen**	**6**	**6**
(Canada) J Hetherington (Canada) G Michibata	4	3
