= Grant Doyle (tennis) =

Australian tennis player

- Country (sports): Australia
- Residence: Canberra, Australia
- Born: 9 January 1974 (age 51); Sydney, Australia
- Height: 180 cm (5 ft 11 in)
- Turned pro: 1990
- Plays: Right-handed
- Prize money: $318,037

Singles
- Career record: 5–26
- Career titles: 0
- Highest ranking: No. 173 (20 October 1997)

Grand Slam singles results
- Australian Open: 1R (1992, 1993, 1995, 1997)
- French Open: 1R (1996)
- Wimbledon: 1R (1992, 1993)
- US Open: 1R (1994)

Doubles
- Career record: 13–22
- Career titles: 0
- Highest ranking: No. 165 (15 August 1994)

Grand Slam doubles results
- Australian Open: 3R (1992, 1999)
- Wimbledon: 1R (1994, 1995)
- US Open: Q1 (1994)

Grant Doyle (born 9 January 1974) is a former professional tennis player from Australia. He is the CEO and owner of Advantage Doyle Tennis Academies.

== Junior career ==
Doyle won four junior Grand Slam titles during his early years. He and partner Joshua Eagle were boys' doubles champions at the 1991 Australian Open. In 1992, he became the number one ranked junior in the world. With new partner Brad Sceney, Doyle won the doubles again in the 1992 Australian Open and was also the singles champion, dropping just two games in his defeat of Brian Dunn in the final. He was a doubles winner at the 1992 French Open, partnering Mexican Enrique Abaroa and won the singles title in that year's Queen's Junior Championships.

== ATP Tour ==
Doyle was a doubles semi-finalist in the 1993 Australian Men's Hardcourt Championships, held in Adelaide, with Eagle as his partner.

As a singles player, he had his best result at the 1997 Sybase Open in San Jose, California, making the quarter-finals, with wins over Brian MacPhie and Jeff Tarango.

Doyle made eight main draw appearances in singles at Grand Slam level. Although he didn't ever proceed past the first round, he came close when he lost 5–7 in the fifth set to Wayne Black at the 1995 Australian Open and also in another five-set loss at the 1996 French Open, to Greg Rusedski, with the same fifth set score.

Every year from 1991 to 1999, Doyle appeared in the men's doubles at the Australian Open. He twice reached the round of 16, with Eagle in 1992 and later partnering Ben Ellwood in the 1999 Australian Open. His run with Ellwood included a win over 12th seeds Donald Johnson and Francisco Montana.

== Coaching ==
Doyle is currently coaching young American Ryan Harrison and has previously worked as the coach of Sam Querrey.

== Junior Grand Slam finals ==
=== Singles: 1 (1 title) ===
Result	Year	Tournament	Surface	Opponent	Score
Win	1992	Australian Open	Hard	(United States) Brian Dunn	6–2, 6–0

=== Doubles: 3 (3 titles) ===
Result	Year	Tournament	Surface	Partnet	Opponents	Score
Win	1991	Australian Open	Hard	(Australia) Joshua Eagle	(Australia) James Holmes (Australia) Paul Kilderry	7–6, 6–4
Win	1992	Australian Open	Hard	(Australia) Bradley Sceney	(United States) Lex Carrington (United States) Jason Thompson	6–4, 6–4
Win	1992	French Open	Clay	(Mexico) Enrique Abaroa	(Russia) Yevgeny Kafelnikov (Germany) Alex Rădulescu	7–6^{(7–0)}, 6–3

== ATP Challenger and ITF Futures finals ==
=== Singles: 2 (0–2) ===
Legend ATP Challenger (0–1) ITF Futures (0–1)	Finals by surface Hard (0–1) Clay (0–0) Grass (0–0) Carpet (0–1)

Result	W–L	Date	Tournament	Tier	Surface	Opponent	Score
Loss	0–1	Feb 1998	West Bloomfield, United States	Challenger	Hard	(United States) Alex O'Brien	6–4, 3–6, 4–6
Loss	0–2	Jun 2000	Ireland F1, Dublin	Futures	Carpet	(Denmark) Kristian Pless	3–6, 7–6^{(7–5)}, 1–6

=== Doubles: 11 (5–6) ===
Legend ATP Challenger (4–5) ITF Futures (1–1)	Finals by surface Hard (3–5) Clay (2–1) Grass (0–0) Carpet (0–0)

Result	W–L	Date	Tournament	Tier	Surface	Partner	Opponents	Score
Loss	0–1	Jul 1993	Aptos, United States	Challenger	Hard	(Italy) Cristiano Caratti	(Israel) Gilad Bloom (France) Christian Saceanu	5–7, 3–6
Loss	0–2	Aug 1993	Bronx, United States	Challenger	Hard	(Australia) Wayne Arthurs	(South Africa) Johan de Beer (South Africa) Kevin Ullyett	6–7, 6–7
Win	1–2	May 1994	Bochum, Germany	Challenger	Clay	(Australia) Michael Tebbutt	(Australia) Andrew Florent (North Macedonia) Aleksandar Kitinov	4–6, 7–6, 7–6
Win	2–2	Aug 1994	Cincinnati, United States	Challenger	Hard	(Australia) Paul Kilderry	(Canada) Brian Gyetko (South Africa) Kevin Ullyett	6–3, 6–4
Loss	2–3	Dec 1996	Perth, Australia	Challenger	Hard	(Australia) Andrew Kratzmann	(Australia) James Holmes (Australia) Andrew Painter	5–7, 4–6
Loss	2–4	Jun 1997	Weiden, Germany	Challenger	Clay	(South Africa) Myles Wakefield	(United States) Geoff Grant (The Bahamas) Mark Merklein	4–6, 6–7
Win	3–4	Jul 1997	Granby, Canada	Challenger	Hard	(The Bahamas) Mark Merklein	(Israel) Eyal Erlich (Switzerland) Lorenzo Manta	7–5, 6–3
Win	4–4	Sep 1997	Edinburgh, United Kingdom	Challenger	Clay	(Australia) Wayne Arthurs	(Australia) James Holmes (South Africa) Chris Haggard	4–6, 6–2, 6–2
Loss	4–5	Feb 1999	Amarillo, United States	Challenger	Hard	(Australia) Andrew Painter	(United States) Bob Bryan (United States) Mike Bryan	4–6, 2–6
Win	5–5	Apr 2000	USA F8, Little Rock	Futures	Hard	(Canada) Frédéric Niemeyer	(South Africa) Pieter Calitz (United States) Jeff Williams	6–2, 6–2
Loss	5–6	Apr 2000	USA F9, Mt. Pleasant	Futures	Hard	(New Zealand) James Greenhalgh	(United States) Gavin Sontag (Canada) Jerry Turek	6–7^{(3–7)}, 5–7

== Performance timelines ==
Key
W	F	SF	QF	#R	RR	Q#	DNQ	A	NH

(W) winner; (F) finalist; (SF) semifinalist; (QF) quarterfinalist; (#R) rounds 4, 3, 2, 1; (RR) round-robin stage; (Q#) qualification round; (DNQ) did not qualify; (A) absent; (NH) not held; (SR) strike rate (events won / competed); (W–L) win–loss record.

=== Singles ===
Tournament	1990	1991	1992	1993	1994	1995	1996	1997	1998	1999	2000	SR	W–L	Win %
Grand Slam tournaments
Australian Open	Q3	Q1	1R	1R	Q1	1R	A	1R	Q1	Q2	Q3	0 / 4	0–4	0%
French Open	A	A	A	A	Q2	Q1	1R	Q1	Q1	A	A	0 / 1	0–1	0%
Wimbledon	A	A	1R	1R	Q3	Q2	Q3	Q3	Q3	Q1	A	0 / 2	0–2	0%
US Open	A	A	Q3	Q2	1R	Q3	Q1	Q3	Q1	A	A	0 / 1	0–1	0%
Win–loss	0–0	0–0	0–2	0–2	0–1	0–1	0–1	0–1	0–0	0–0	0–0	0 / 8	0–8	0%
ATP Masters Series
Indian Wells	A	A	A	A	A	Q1	A	A	A	A	A	0 / 0	0–0	–
Miami	A	A	A	A	A	Q2	A	Q1	A	A	A	0 / 0	0–0	–
Rome	A	A	A	A	Q3	A	A	A	A	A	A	0 / 0	0–0	–
Cincinnati	A	A	A	1R	Q1	A	A	A	A	A	A	0 / 1	0–1	0%
Win–loss	0–0	0–0	0–0	0–1	0–0	0–0	0–0	0–0	0–0	0–0	0–0	0 / 1	0–1	0%

=== Doubles ===
Tournament	1991	1992	1993	1994	1995	1996	1997	1998	1999	SR	W–L	Win %
Grand Slam tournaments
Australian Open	2R	3R	1R	2R	1R	1R	1R	2R	3R	0 / 9	7–9	44%
French Open	A	A	A	A	A	A	A	A	A	0 / 0	0–0	–
Wimbledon	Q2	A	Q2	1R	1R	Q3	Q2	Q1	Q1	0 / 2	0–2	0%
US Open	A	A	A	Q1	A	A	A	A	A	0 / 0	0–0	–
Win–loss	1–1	2–1	0–1	1–2	0–2	0–1	0–1	1–1	2–1	0 / 11	7–11	39%
ATP Masters Series
Miami	A	A	A	A	2R	A	A	A	A	0 / 1	1–1	50%
Cincinnati	A	A	A	1R	A	A	A	A	A	0 / 1	0–1	0%
Win–loss	0–0	0–0	0–0	0–1	1–1	0–0	0–0	0–0	0–0	0 / 2	1–2	33%
