= Brian Dunn (tennis) =

American tennis player

- Country (sports): United States
- Residence: Bradenton, Florida, United States
- Born: 5 April 1974 Tampa, Florida, United States
- Height: 6 ft 7 in (201 cm)
- Turned pro: 1992
- Plays: Right-handed
- Prize money: $107,978

Singles
- Career record: 4–12
- Career titles: 0; 0 Challenger, 0 Futures
- Highest ranking: No. 153 (27 November 1995)

Grand Slam singles results
- Australian Open: Q2 (1992, 1994)
- US Open: 2R (1992)

Doubles
- Career record: 1–5
- Career titles: 0; 1 Challenger, 0 Futures
- Highest ranking: No. 246 (23 October 1995)

Grand Slam doubles results
- US Open: 1R (1993)

Grand Slam mixed doubles results
- US Open: 2R (1992)
- Last updated on: 5 December 2021.

Brian Dunn (born April 5, 1974) was the 1992 juniors US Open champion for tennis. That same year losing in the final round of the Junior Wimbledon, and Australian Open. However, he retired at a young age due to knee injuries.

The 6 feet, 7 inch Dunn reached a high ATP ranking of world No. 153. A native of Tampa, Florida, he resided in Bradenton while on the tour. He reached the second round of the (senior) 1992 US Open in his only grand slam event main draw appearance. Dunn played in a handful of grand prix events during 1992 through 1995, finishing with a career record of 4 wins, 12 losses. He reached one final in challenger events, the Naples Challenger in May, 1994. He played his final tour event in September 1996.

Dunn was also the 14-and-under singles champion at Les Petits As in 1988.

== Junior Grand Slam finals ==
=== Singles: 3 (1 title, 2 runner-ups) ===
Result	Year	Tournament	Surface	Opponent	Score
Loss	1992	Australian Open	Hard	(Australia) Grant Doyle	2–6, 0–6
Loss	1992	Wimbledon	Grass	(Czech Republic) David Škoch	4–6, 3–6
Win	1992	US Open	Hard	(Israel) Noam Behr	7–5, 6–2

== ATP Challenger and ITF Futures Finals ==
=== Singles: 1 (0–1) ===
Legend ATP Challenger (0–1) ITF Futures (0–0)	Finals by surface Hard (0–0) Clay (0–1) Grass (0–0) Carpet (0–0)

Result	W–L	Date	Tournament	Tier	Surface	Opponent	Score
Loss	0–1	Dec 1994	Naples, United States	Challenger	Clay	(Norway) Christian Ruud	1–6, 0–6

=== Doubles: 1 (1–0) ===
Legend ATP Challenger (1–0) ITF Futures (0–0)	Finals by surface Hard (0–0) Clay (1–0) Grass (0–0) Carpet (0–0)

Result	W–L	Date	Tournament	Tier	Surface	Partner	Opponents	Score
Win	1–0	Sep 1995	Tashkent, Uzbekistan	Challenger	Clay	(Hungary) Attila Sávolt	(Israel) Noam Behr (Israel) Eyal Ran	6–3, 6–2

== Performance timeline ==
Key
W	F	SF	QF	#R	RR	Q#	DNQ	A	NH

(W) winner; (F) finalist; (SF) semifinalist; (QF) quarterfinalist; (#R) rounds 4, 3, 2, 1; (RR) round-robin stage; (Q#) qualification round; (DNQ) did not qualify; (A) absent; (NH) not held; (SR) strike rate (events won / competed); (W–L) win–loss record.

=== Singles ===
Tournament	1992	1993	1994	1995	1996	SR	W–L	Win %
Grand Slam tournaments
Australian Open	Q2	Q1	Q2	A	A	0 / 0	0–0	–
French Open	A	A	A	A	A	0 / 0	0–0	–
Wimbledon	A	A	A	A	A	0 / 0	0–0	–
US Open	2R	Q1	Q1	A	A	0 / 1	1–1	50%
Win–loss	1–1	0–0	0–0	0–0	0–0	0 / 1	1–1	50%
ATP Masters Series
Indian Wells	A	Q2	Q1	Q1	A	0 / 0	0–0	–
Miami	1R	Q1	Q1	A	Q2	0 / 1	0–1	0%
Canada	A	A	Q1	A	A	0 / 0	0–0	–
Win–loss	0–1	0–0	0–0	0–0	0–0	0 / 1	0–1	0%
