= 1994 Australian Open – Women's singles =

Women's singles
- 1994 Australian Open

Final
- Champion: (Germany) Steffi Graf
- Runner-up: (Spain) Arantxa Sánchez Vicario
- Score: 6–0, 6–2

Details
- Draw: 128
- Seeds: 16

Events
Singles	men	women		boys	girls
Doubles	men	women	mixed	boys	girls
WC Singles	men	women	quad
WC Doubles	men	women	quad
Legends	men	women	mixed
- Australian Open

Steffi Graf defeated Arantxa Sánchez Vicario in the final, 6–0, 6–2 to win the women's singles tennis title at the 1994 Australian Open. It was her fourth Australian Open title and 15th major singles title overall. With the win, Graf achieved a non-calendar-year Grand Slam, dubbed the 'Steffi Slam'. This was the second time in her career that she won four consecutive majors, after achieving the Grand Slam in 1988. For the third time in her career, Graf did not lose a set during the tournament.

Monica Seles was the three-time reigning champion, but did not participate due to her stabbing in April 1993.

== Seeds ==
1. (Germany) Steffi Graf (champion)
2. (Spain) Arantxa Sánchez Vicario (final)
3. (Spain) Conchita Martínez (quarterfinals)
4. (Argentina) Gabriela Sabatini (semifinals)
5. (Czech Republic) Jana Novotná (quarterfinals)
6. (United States) Mary Joe Fernández (fourth round)
7. (Germany) Anke Huber (third round)
8. (Switzerland) Manuela Maleeva (quarterfinals)
9. (France) Mary Pierce (fourth round)
10. (Japan) Kimiko Date (semifinals)
11. (United States) Zina Garrison (first round)
12. (South Africa) Amanda Coetzer (second round)
13. (Czech Republic) Helena Suková (third round)
14. (Bulgaria) Magdalena Maleeva (fourth round)
15. (France) Nathalie Tauziat (first round)
16. (United States) Lindsay Davenport (quarterfinals)

== Draw ==
Key

- Q = Qualifier
- WC = Wild card
- LL = Lucky loser
- Alt = Alternate
- ITF = ITF entry
- PR = Protected ranking
- SR = Special ranking
- SE = Special exempt
- JE = Junior exempt
- JR = Junior Accelerator Programme entrant
- CO = College Accelerator Programme entrant
- NG = Next Gen Accelerator Program entrant
- w/o = Walkover
- r = Retired
- d = Defaulted

=== Finals ===
Quarterfinals
1	(Germany) Steffi Graf	6	6
16	(United States) Lindsay Davenport	3	2
3	(Spain) Conchita Martínez	2	6	3
10	(Japan) Kimiko Date	6	4	6
5	(Czech Republic) Jana Novotná	3	4
4	(Argentina) Gabriela Sabatini	6	6
8	(Switzerland) Manuela Maleeva	6^{3}	4
2	(Spain) Arantxa Sánchez Vicario	7^{7}	6

Semifinals
1	(Germany) Steffi Graf	6	6
10	(Japan) Kimiko Date	3	3
4	(Argentina) Gabriela Sabatini	1	2
2	(Spain) Arantxa Sánchez Vicario	6	6

Final
1	(Germany) Steffi Graf	6	6
2	(Spain) Arantxa Sánchez Vicario	0	2

=== Top half ===
==== Section 1 ====
First round
1	(Germany) S Graf	6	2
(United States) K Po	1	0^{r}
(Australia) N Provis	7	6
(United Kingdom) C Wood	5	4
(United States) P Shriver	2	6	6
(Belgium) L Courtois	6	1	4
(Germany) B Rittner	6	6
(Italy) F Bonsignori	0	0
(France) S Testud	6	6
(Italy) M Grossi	1	3
(United States) L Raymond	6	2	6
(Netherlands) M Oremans	2	6	4
(Japan) M Endo	6	6
(Belgium) D Monami	4	3
WC	(Australia) J Byrne	7^{7}	6^{7}	2
13	(Czech Republic) H Suková	6^{5}	7^{9}	6

Second round
1	(Germany) S Graf	6	6
(Australia) N Provis	1	4
(United States) P Shriver	4	6	2
(Germany) B Rittner	6	3	6
(France) S Testud	7	3	6
(United States) L Raymond	5	6	3
(Japan) M Endo	4	7	5
13	(Czech Republic) H Suková	6	5	7

Third round
1	(Germany) S Graf	6	6
(Germany) B Rittner	2	4
(France) S Testud	6	6
13	(Czech Republic) H Suková	4	3

Fourth round
1	(Germany) S Graf	6	6
(France) S Testud	1	2

==== Section 2 ====
First round
16	(United States) L Davenport	3	6	7
(Canada) P Hy	6	2	5
(Germany) W Probst	7^{8}	5	6
(Czech Republic) P Langrová	6^{6}	7	4
Q	(Russia) E Makarova	6	6
(Belgium) S Wasserman	4	3
(Canada) R Simpson-Alter	6	6
WC	(Australia) N Pratt	3	0
(Croatia) N Ercegović	4	6	7
(United States) R White	6	3	5
(United States) C Kuhlman	6	6
(Germany) K Kschwendt	4	1
(Argentina) I Gorrochategui	6	6
WC	(Australia) K Godridge	4	3
Q	(United States) E Hakami	4	3
6	(United States) M J Fernandez	6	6

Second round
16	(United States) L Davenport	6	7
(Germany) W Probst	1	5
Q	(Russia) E Makarova	6	7^{7}
(Canada) R Simpson-Alter	3	6^{4}
(Croatia) N Ercegović	5	6	1
(United States) C Kuhlman	7	4	6
(Argentina) I Gorrochategui	3	6	7
6	(United States) M J Fernandez	6	2	9

Third round
16	(United States) L Davenport	6	6
Q	(Russia) E Makarova	1	2
(United States) C Kuhlman	4	1
6	(United States) M J Fernandez	6	6

Fourth round
16	(United States) L Davenport	6	6^{4}	6
6	(United States) M J Fernandez	2	7^{7}	2

==== Section 3 ====
First round
3	(Spain) C Martínez	5	6	6
(Belarus) N Zvereva	7	4	3
(United States) P Fendick	6	6
Q	(Slovenia) T Križan	4	4
(United States) A Frazier	6	2	6
(Australia) E Smylie	1	6	2
(Czech Republic) R Bobková	6	6
(Greece) C Papadáki	1	3
(Australia) K Radford	3	7^{7}	7
(Slovakia) J Husárová	6	6^{3}	5
(Germany) M Kochta	6	4	7
(South Africa) J Kruger	2	6	5
(United States) C Rubin	6	6
(Bulgaria) K Maleeva	4	3
(Germany) P Begerow	1	3
12	(South Africa) A Coetzer	6	6

Second round
3	(Spain) C Martínez	6^{4}	6	6
(United States) P Fendick	7^{7}	1	4
(United States) A Frazier	6	6
(Czech Republic) R Bobková	2	1
(Australia) K Radford	7	6
(Germany) M Kochta	5	2
(United States) C Rubin	6	2	6
12	(South Africa) A Coetzer	1	6	3

Third round
3	(Spain) C Martínez	6	6
(United States) A Frazier	3	0
(Australia) K Radford	3	6^{1}
(United States) C Rubin	6	7^{7}

Fourth round
3	(Spain) C Martínez	7^{7}	6
(United States) C Rubin	6^{4}	3

==== Section 4 ====
First round
10	(Japan) K Date	6	6
(United States) K Rinaldi	1	1
(United States) M McGrath	3	6	6
(Latvia) L Neiland	6	4	4
(United States) D Graham	3	7	6
WC	(Australia) R Stubbs	6	5	0
(Australia) R McQuillan	6	6
(Austria) P Ritter	1	3
(Netherlands) K Boogert	6	6
Q	(Netherlands) M Bollegraf	3	3
(United States) G Helgeson	6	6
(Germany) V Martinek	3	2
(France) J Halard	6	6
WC	(Australia) K-A Guse	0	2
(Georgia (country)) L Meskhi	1	3
7	(Germany) A Huber	6	6

Second round
10	(Japan) K Date	6	6
(United States) M McGrath	4	2
(United States) D Graham	2	6	4
(Australia) R McQuillan	6	3	6
(Netherlands) K Boogert	2	0
(United States) G Helgeson	6	6
(France) J Halard	6^{6}	6	3
7	(Germany) A Huber	7^{8}	3	6

Third round
10	(Japan) K Date	6	7
(Australia) R McQuillan	3	5
(United States) G Helgeson	3	7^{12}	6
7	(Germany) A Huber	6	6^{10}	4

Fourth round
10	(Japan) K Date	7	6
(United States) G Helgeson	5	1

=== Bottom half ===
==== Section 5 ====
First round
5	(Czech Republic) J Novotná	6	6
(China) F Li	1	3
(Canada) H Kelesi	6	6
(Italy) S Farina	1	1
(Germany) C Singer	6	6
(Romania) I Spîrlea	2	4
WC	(Australia) J Taylor	6	6^{4}	6
Q	(Netherlands) C Vis	2	7^{7}	4
(United States) G Fernández	6	6
Q	(Japan) N Kijimuta	1	4
(Japan) Y Kamio	6	6
WC	(Australia) L McShea	1	3
(Switzerland) E Zardo	6	7
(Slovakia) K Studenikova	4	5
(Indonesia) N Basuki	6	7^{9}
15	(France) N Tauziat	4	6^{7}

Second round
5	(Czech Republic) J Novotná	6	6
(Canada) H Kelesi	3	1
(Germany) C Singer	5	6	5
WC	(Australia) J Taylor	7	4	7
(United States) G Fernández	6	6
(Japan) Y Kamio	3	2
(Switzerland) E Zardo	6	7^{7}
(Indonesia) N Basuki	2	6^{5}

Third round
5	(Czech Republic) J Novotná	6	6
WC	(Australia) J Taylor	4	2
(United States) G Fernández	6^{2}	4
(Switzerland) E Zardo	7^{7}	6

Fourth round
5	(Czech Republic) J Novotná	6	7
(Switzerland) E Zardo	2	5

==== Section 6 ====
First round
9	(France) M Pierce	6	6
(Italy) N Baudone	2	1
(United States) L Harvey-Wild	6	6
(Austria) S Dopfer	3	2
(Argentina) F Labat	6	6
(Spain) V Ruano Pascual	3	1
(Belgium) S Appelmans	5	6	3
(France) N van Lottum	7	2	0^{r}
(United States) T Whitlinger	6	6
(Argentina) M J Gaidano	3	2
(Italy) L Ferrando	6	6
(United States) J Watanabe	4	3
(Ukraine) N Medvedeva	7	6
(Netherlands) N Krijger-Jagerman	5	2
(Netherlands) S Rottier	6^{3}	3
4	(Argentina) G Sabatini	7^{7}	6

Second round
9	(France) M Pierce	6^{4}	7	6
(United States) L Harvey-Wild	7^{7}	5	3
(Argentina) F Labat	2	3
(Belgium) S Appelmans	6	6
(United States) T Whitlinger	4	1
(Italy) L Ferrando	6	6
(Ukraine) N Medvedeva	1	6	5
4	(Argentina) G Sabatini	6	3	7

Third round
9	(France) M Pierce	6	6
(Belgium) S Appelmans	3	2
(Italy) L Ferrando	2	1
4	(Argentina) G Sabatini	6	6

Fourth round
9	(France) M Pierce	3	3
4	(Argentina) G Sabatini	6	6

==== Section 7 ====
First round
8	(Switzerland) Man Maleeva	6	6
(Italy) L Golarsa	0	3
(Romania) C Cristea	7^{7}	6
WC	(Australia) J Limmer	6^{4}	3
(Argentina) P Tarabini	6	7^{8}
(Mexico) A Gavaldón	4	6^{6}
(Indonesia) R Tedjakusuma	6	6
(France) K Quentrec	0	4
LL	(Finland) N Dahlman	6	6^{3}	7
(Slovakia) R Zrubáková	2	7^{7}	5
(Austria) B Reinstadler	6	6
(United States) S Stafford	2	4
(United States) T Austin	6	7
(South Africa) E Reinach	1	5
(Germany) S Hack	7	6
11	(United States) Z Garrison	5	3

Second round
8	(Switzerland) Man Maleeva	5	6	6
(Romania) C Cristea	7	4	4
(Argentina) P Tarabini	2	6^{2}
(Indonesia) R Tedjakusuma	6	7^{7}
LL	(Finland) N Dahlman	3	6	5
(Austria) B Reinstadler	6	4	7
(United States) T Austin	1	7	2
(Germany) S Hack	6	5	6

Third round
8	(Switzerland) Man Maleeva	6	6
(Indonesia) R Tedjakusuma	0	1
(Austria) B Reinstadler	3	6	5
(Germany) S Hack	6	3	7

Fourth round
8	(Switzerland) Man Maleeva	7	6^{2}	7
(Germany) S Hack	5	7^{7}	5

==== Section 8 ====
First round
14	(Bulgaria) Mag Maleeva	6	6
(United States) S Cacic	3	1
(Japan) N Sawamatsu	6	6
(Australia) M Jaggard-Lai	4	1
Q	(Israel) A Smashnova	6	6
(Romania) R Dragomir	2	0
(Kazakhstan) E Likhovtseva	6	6
(Paraguay) R de los Ríos	2	2
(Belarus) T Ignatieva	6	6
Q	(Poland) M Mróz	1	2
(United States) A Grossman	6^{5}	6	6
(United States) N Arendt	7^{7}	3	0
(Chinese Taipei) S-t Wang	6	6
(United States) A Keller	4	0
(Slovakia) K Habšudová	1	3
2	(Spain) A Sánchez Vicario	6	6

Second round
14	(Bulgaria) Mag Maleeva	6	6
(Japan) N Sawamatsu	2	4
Q	(Israel) A Smashnova	6	2	1
(Kazakhstan) E Likhovtseva	2	6	6
(Belarus) T Ignatieva	1	0
(United States) A Grossman	6	6
(Chinese Taipei) S-t Wang	2	4
2	(Spain) A Sánchez Vicario	6	6

Third round
14	(Bulgaria) Mag Maleeva	6	6
(Kazakhstan) E Likhovtseva	4	2
(United States) A Grossman	2	3
2	(Spain) A Sánchez Vicario	6	6

Fourth round
14	(Bulgaria) Mag Maleeva	6	1	3
2	(Spain) A Sánchez Vicario	4	6	6

Preceded by 1993 US Open – Women's singles	Grand Slam women's singles	Succeeded by 1994 French Open – Women's singles
