= Heath Denman =

Australian tennis player

- Full name: Heath Denman
- Country (sports): Australia
- Born: 17 January 1971 (age 54); Ipswich, Queensland, Australia
- Prize money: $60,213

Singles
- Career record: 1–5
- Career titles: 0
- Highest ranking: No. 247 (20 December 1993)

Grand Slam singles results
- Australian Open: 2R (1993)

Doubles
- Career record: 2–7
- Career titles: 0
- Highest ranking: No. 204 (28 March 1994)

Grand Slam doubles results
- Australian Open: 2R (1994)

Heath Denman (born 17 January 1971) is a former professional tennis player from Australia.

== Biography ==
Denman, who comes from Ipswich in Queensland, was given a wildcard into the 1991 Australian Open, which he exited with a first-round loss to Mats Wilander. When he returned to the main draw of the Australia Open in 1993 he made it to the second round by beating Jeremy Bates in four sets. In 1993 he also featured in the main draw of ATP Tour tournaments in Kuala Lumpur and Sydney. For most of 1994 and 1995 he took time away from tennis, but was then motivated to make a comeback and appeared at the 1996 Australian Open.
