= 1994 Australian Open – Mixed doubles =

Mixed doubles
- 1994 Australian Open

Final
- Champions: (Latvia) Larisa Neiland (Russia) Andrei Olhovskiy
- Runners-up: (Czech Republic) Helena Suková (Australia) Todd Woodbridge
- Score: 7–5, 6–7^{(0–7)}, 6–2

Details
- Draw: 32
- Seeds: 8

Events
Singles	men	women		boys	girls
Doubles	men	women	mixed	boys	girls
WC Singles	men	women	quad
WC Doubles	men	women	quad
Legends	men	women	mixed
- Australian Open

Arantxa Sánchez Vicario and Todd Woodbridge were the defending champions but they competed with different partners that year, Sánchez Vicario with Emilio Sánchez and Woodbridge with Helena Suková.

Sánchez Vicario and Sánchez lost in the semifinals to Suková and Woodbridge.

Suková and Woodbridge lost in the final 7–5, 6–7^{(0–7)}, 6–2 against Larisa Neiland and Andrei Olhovskiy.

== Seeds ==
Champion seeds are indicated in bold text while text in italics indicates the round in which those seeds were eliminated.

1. (Czech Republic) Helena Suková / (Australia) Todd Woodbridge (final)
2. (United States) Gigi Fernández / (Czech Republic) Cyril Suk (quarterfinals)
3. (Belarus) Natasha Zvereva / (Netherlands) Jacco Eltingh (first round)
4. (Australia) Rennae Stubbs / (Australia) Mark Woodforde (quarterfinals)
5. (United States) Kathy Rinaldi-Stunkel / (United States) Patrick Galbraith (second round)
6. (Latvia) **Larisa Neiland** / (Russia) **Andrei Olhovskiy (champions)**
7. (Ukraine) Natalia Medvedeva / (Netherlands) Paul Haarhuis (semifinals)
8. (Spain) Arantxa Sánchez Vicario / (Spain) Emilio Sánchez (semifinals)

== Draw ==
Key

- Q = Qualifier
- WC = Wild card
- LL = Lucky loser
- Alt = Alternate
- ITF = ITF entry
- PR = Protected ranking
- SR = Special ranking
- SE = Special exempt
- JE = Junior exempt
- JR = Junior Accelerator Programme entrant
- CO = College Accelerator Programme entrant
- NG = Next Gen Accelerator Program entrant
- w/o = Walkover
- r = Retired
- d = Defaulted

=== Final ===
Final
1	(Czech Republic) Helena Suková (Australia) Todd Woodbridge	5	**7^{7}**	2
6	(Latvia) **Larisa Neiland** (Russia) **Andrei Olhovskiy**	**7**	6^{0}	**6**

=== Top half ===
First round
1	(Czech Republic) **H Suková** (Australia) **T Woodbridge**	**6**	**7**
(South Africa) E Reinach (South Africa) D Visser	1	5
(United States) **P Shriver** (United States) **M Bauer**	**6**	**6**
WC	(Australia) N Provis (Australia) D Cahill	3	4
(United States) L Davenport (United States) L Jensen	1	2
WC	(United States) **M J Fernandez** (Australia) **S Stolle**	**6**	**6**
(United States) P Fendick (United States) S DeVries	**7^{10}**	5	3
5	(United States) **K Rinaldi-Stunkel** (United States) **P Galbraith**	6^{8}	**7**	**6**
4	(Australia) **R Stubbs** (Australia) **M Woodforde**	**6**	**7**
(Germany) A Huber (United States) M Jensen	2	5
(Netherlands) **M Bollegraf** (Netherlands) **T Nijssen**	**6**	**6**
(Argentina) P Tarabini (Mexico) J Lozano	3	4
(Czech Republic) A Strnadová (Australia) L Warder	1	3
(Australia) **E Smylie** (Australia) **J Fitzgerald**	**6**	**6**
(United States) L Harvey-Wild (United States) B Pearce	**6**	1	2
8	(Spain) **A Sánchez Vicario** (Spain) **E Sánchez**	4	**6**	**6**

Second round
1	(Czech Republic) **H Suková** (Australia) **T Woodbridge**	**6**	**6**
(United States) P Shriver (United States) M Bauer	2	4
WC	(United States) **M J Fernandez** (Australia) **S Stolle**	**6**	**7**
5	(United States) K Rinaldi-Stunkel (United States) P Galbraith	3	5
4	(Australia) **R Stubbs** (Australia) **M Woodforde**	**7^{7}**	6^{11}	**7**
(Netherlands) M Bollegraf (Netherlands) T Nijssen	6^{1}	**7^{13}**	5
(Australia) E Smylie (Australia) J Fitzgerald	3	6^{5}
8	(Spain) **A Sánchez Vicario** (Spain) **E Sánchez**	**6**	**7^{7}**

Quarterfinals
1	(Czech Republic) **H Suková** (Australia) **T Woodbridge**	**6**	3	**6**
WC	(United States) M J Fernandez (Australia) S Stolle	4	**6**	3
4	(Australia) R Stubbs (Australia) M Woodforde	4	2
8	(Spain) **A Sánchez Vicario** (Spain) **E Sánchez**	**6**	**6**

Semifinals
1	(Czech Republic) **H Suková** (Australia) **T Woodbridge**	**6**	**6**
8	(Spain) A Sánchez Vicario (Spain) E Sánchez	3	4

=== Bottom half ===
First round
7	(Ukraine) **N Medvedeva** (Netherlands) **P Haarhuis**	**6**	5	**7**
(Argentina) I Gorrochategui (Spain) J Sánchez	2	**7**	5
(Russia) **E Maniokova** (South Africa) **D Adams**	**6**	**7^{7}**
(United States) D Graham (United States) S Davis	4	6^{5}
(United States) **A Grossman** (Netherlands) **M Oosting**	**6**	**6**
(United States) K Adams (Netherlands) H J Davids	2	2
(Canada) **J Hetherington** (United States) **D Randall**	5	**7^{7}**	**7**
3	(Belarus) N Zvereva (Netherlands) J Eltingh	**7**	6^{5}	5
6	(Latvia) **L Neiland** (Russia) **A Olhovskiy**	**6**	**6**
(Netherlands) N Muns-Jagerman (South Africa) G Muller	4	4
(Japan) N Miyagi (United States) K Flach	0	3
(United States) **R White** (Canada) **G Connell**	**6**	**6**
(United States) Z Garrison-Jackson (Spain) S Casal	**6**	6^{2}	5
(United States) **M McGrath** (United States) **S Melville**	4	**7^{7}**	**7**
(South Africa) A Coetzer (South Africa) J-L de Jager	2	3
2	(United States) **G Fernández** (Czech Republic) **C Suk**	**6**	**6**

Second round
7	(Ukraine) **N Medvedeva** (Netherlands) **P Haarhuis**	**6**	**6**
(Russia) E Maniokova (South Africa) D Adams	2	3
(United States) A Grossman (Netherlands) M Oosting	1	2
(Canada) **J Hetherington** (United States) **D Randall**	**6**	**6**
6	(Latvia) **L Neiland** (Russia) **A Olhovskiy**	**6**	5	**7**
(United States) R White (Canada) G Connell	3	**7**	5
(United States) M McGrath (United States) S Melville	4	4
2	(United States) **G Fernández** (Czech Republic) **C Suk**	**6**	**6**

Quarterfinals
7	(Ukraine) **N Medvedeva** (Netherlands) **P Haarhuis**	**7^{7}**	**6**
(Canada) J Hetherington (United States) D Randall	6^{4}	3
6	(Latvia) **L Neiland** (Russia) **A Olhovskiy**	**6**	2	**6**
2	(United States) G Fernández (Czech Republic) C Suk	2	**6**	2

Semifinals
7	(Ukraine) N Medvedeva (Netherlands) P Haarhuis	1	0	r
6	(Latvia) **L Neiland** (Russia) **A Olhovskiy**	**6**	1
