= Ryan Blake (tennis) =

American tennis player and basketball scout

- Full name: Ryan Blake
- Country (sports): United States
- Born: February 4, 1966 (age 59)
- Prize money: $18,771

Singles
- Career record: 0–1
- Highest ranking: No. 383 (February 7, 1994)

Grand Slam singles results
- Australian Open: 1R (1994)

Doubles
- Career record: 0–3
- Highest ranking: No. 443 (November 29, 1993)

Ryan Blake (born February 4, 1966) is a former professional tennis player from the United States.

== Biography ==
Blake played collegiate tennis with Georgia Southern University, while studying for a degree in journalism. After graduating he competed on the professional tennis circuit for several years. Most notably, he qualified for the singles main draw at the 1994 Australian Open, with wins over Gilad Bloom, Tom Kempers and Louis Gloria. He was beaten by 16th seed Arnaud Boetsch in the first round. His three main draw appearances on the ATP Tour were all in doubles, at Schenectady in 1993, then Atlanta in both 1997 and 2000.

He followed in the footsteps of his father Marty Blake, former general manager of the Atlanta Hawks, as a basketball scout.

Married with two children, Blake currently lives near Atlanta. He is a drummer in the band The Other White Meat.
