= Helena Suková =

Czech tennis player (born 1965)

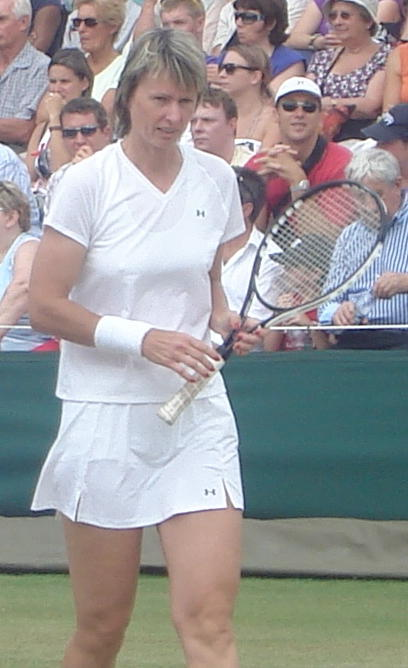
- Suková at Legends Doubles Final 2009, Wimbledon
- Country (sports): Czechoslovakia (1983–1992); Czech Republic (1992–1998)
- Residence: Prague, Czech Republic
- Born: 23 February 1965 (age 61) Prague, Czechoslovakia
- Height: 1.88 m (6 ft 2 in)
- Turned pro: 1983
- Retired: 1998
- Plays: Right-handed (one-handed backhand)
- Prize money: $6,391,245
- Int. Tennis HoF: 2018 (member page)

Singles
- Career record: 614–307
- Career titles: 10
- Highest ranking: No. 4 (18 March 1985)

Grand Slam singles results
- Australian Open: F (1984, 1989)
- French Open: SF (1986)
- Wimbledon: QF (1985, 1986, 1987, 1988, 1993)
- US Open: F (1986, 1993)

Doubles
- Career record: 752–220
- Career titles: 69
- Highest ranking: No. 1 (5 February 1990)

Grand Slam doubles results
- Australian Open: W (1990, 1992)
- French Open: W (1990)
- Wimbledon: W (1987, 1989, 1990, 1996)
- US Open: W (1985, 1993)

Other doubles tournaments
- Tour Finals: W (1992)

Mixed doubles
- Career titles: 5

Grand Slam mixed doubles results
- Australian Open: F (1994, 1998)
- French Open: W (1991)
- Wimbledon: W (1994, 1996, 1997)
- US Open: W (1993)

Team competitions
- Fed Cup: W (1983, 1984, 1985, 1988)
- Hopman Cup: W (1989)
Medal record
Olympic Games – Tennis
Silver medal – second place	1988 Seoul	Doubles
Silver medal – second place	1996 Atlanta	Doubles

Helena Suková (Czech pronunciation: [ˈɦɛlɛna ˈsukovaː]) (born 23 February 1965) is a Czech former professional tennis player. She was ranked as the world No. 1 in women's doubles by the Women's Tennis Association (WTA), and No. 4 in singles. Suková won 14 major titles: nine in women's doubles and five in mixed doubles. She is also a two-time Olympic silver medalist in doubles, a four-time major singles runner-up, and won a total of ten singles titles and 69 doubles titles.

== Family ==
Suková comes from a prominent Czech tennis family. Her mother, Věra Pužejová Suková, was a women's singles finalist at Wimbledon in 1962. Her father, Cyril Suk II, was president of the Czechoslovak Tennis Federation.

Her brother, Cyril Suk III, is a former professional player on the men's tour who teamed with Suková to win three Grand Slam mixed doubles titles, at the French Open in 1991 and at Wimbledon in 1996 and 1997.

== Career ==
Suková turned professional in 1981. Her career-high world rankings were fourth in singles and first in women's doubles.

Suková was a singles runner-up at the Australian Open twice (in 1984 and 1989) and at the US Open twice (in 1986 and 1993). Her most memorable Grand Slam singles win was against fellow Czech Martina Navratilova in a semifinal of the 1984 Australian Open, where she ended Navratilova's 74-match winning streak and her chance at winning a calendar year Grand Slam. Chris Evert defeated her in the final.

In 1987, she became the fourth player to defeat Navratilova and Evert in the same tournament at Eastbourne and she also stopped Navratilova's 69 grass-win streak. Suková had a career Grand Slam in women's doubles, winning four titles at Wimbledon, two at the US Open, one at the Australian Open, and one at the French Open.

She won three mixed doubles titles at Wimbledon, one at the US Open, and one at the French Open. She also was a women's doubles silver medalist at the Olympic Games in 1988 and 1996 (both times partnering Jana Novotná).

Suková helped Czechoslovakia win the Fed Cup four times, in 1983, 1984, 1985, and 1988. She also teamed with Miloslav Mečíř to win the inaugural Hopman Cup for Czechoslovakia in 1989.

Over the course of her career, Suková won 10 singles titles and 69 doubles titles. Despite retiring from the professional tour in 1998, she was given a wild card into the 2006 Wimbledon mixed doubles tournament with her brother, Cyril Suk III. They lost their first-round match.

== Post-retirement activity ==
In 1999, Suková helped re-establish the International Lawn Tennis Club of the Czech Republic and became its president.

From January 2001 until June 2008, she was a co-opted member of the executive committee of the Council of the International Clubs. From February 2001 until November 2008, she served on the presidium of the Czech Olympians' Club. In June 2007, Suková was appointed by The Czech Olympic Committee to the presidium of the Czech Fair Play Club. She is also a co-founder of the Kids and Junior Tennis Advancement Organization in the Czech Republic.

Helena Sukova is also a member of the 'Champions for Peace' club, a group of 90 famous athletes committed to serving peace in the world through sport, created by Peace and Sport, a Monaco-based international organization.

Helena Sukova got her university doctorate degree in psychology, and since February 2011, has served as a vice president of the Association of Sport Psychologists in the Czech Republic, and served on the working group of the Task Force on Sport Psychology of the European Federation of Psychologists' Associations. She works as a psychologist on a regular basis with her clientele, who range from non-sporting circles to former or current professional athletes.

== Hall of Fame induction ==
On 24 January 2018, Helena Sukova was elected into the Tennis Hall of Fame.

== Grand Slam performance timeline ==
Key
W	F	SF	QF	#R	RR	Q#	DNQ	A	NH

(W) winner; (F) finalist; (SF) semifinalist; (QF) quarterfinalist; (#R) rounds 4, 3, 2, 1; (RR) round-robin stage; (Q#) qualification round; (DNQ) did not qualify; (A) absent; (NH) not held; (SR) strike rate (events won / competed); (W–L) win–loss record.

=== Singles ===
Tournament	1981	1982	1983	1984	1985	1986	1987	1988	1989	1990	1991	1992	1993	1994	1995	1996	1997	1998	W–L
Australian Open	3R	1R	3R	F	QF	NH	4R	QF	F	SF	3R	3R	A	3R	2R	3R	1R	1R	38–16
French Open	A	2R	4R	1R	2R	SF	4R	QF	2R	A	2R	A	A	3R	1R	1R	2R	A	21–13
Wimbledon	A	1R	1R	4R	QF	QF	QF	QF	4R	4R	1R	3R	QF	4R	2R	2R	4R	1R	39–17
US Open	A	1R	3R	QF	QF	F	SF	4R	QF	4R	3R	4R	F	A	2R	3R	1R	A	45–15
Year-end ranking	74	25	16	7	9	5	7	8	8	14	17	12	17	22	29	27	80	NR	

=== Doubles ===
Tournament	1982	1983	1984	1985	1986	1987	1988	1989	1990	1991	1992	1993	1994	1995	1996	1997	1998	SR	W–L
Australian Open	2R	A	F	F	NH	SF	A	SF	W	3R	W	A	3R	QF	1R	SF	1R	2 / 13	39–11
French Open	3R	1R	3R	F	SF	SF	F	SF	W	SF	A	A	1R	1R	QF	QF	SF	1 / 15	46–14
Wimbledon	2R	3R	1R	SF	2R	W	A	W	W	QF	SF	QF	2R	QF	W	SF	QF	4 / 16	53–12
US Open	3R	A	1R	W	QF	QF	3R	3R	F	3R	SF	W	A	SF	SF	3R	A	2 / 14	45–12
Win–loss	6–4	2–2	6–4	19–3	8–3	16–3	7–2	16–3	23–1	11–4	14–2	9–1	3–3	10–4	13–3	13–4	7–3	9 / 58	183–49
Year-end championships
Tour Championships	A	A	A	F	F	F	SF	SF	QF	SF	W	SF	A	QF	QF	SF	A	1 / 12	14–1
Career statistics
Year-end ranking	—N/a	—N/a	8	3	3	6	4	2	1	8	1	2	23	9	6	10	42		

=== Mixed doubles ===
Tournament	1982	1983	1984	1985	1986	1987	1988	1989	1990	1991	1992	1993	1994	1995	1996	1997	1998	1999– 2005	2006	W–L
Australian Open	NH	NH	NH	NH	NH	A	A	A	A	1R	A	A	F	SF	QF	2R	F	A	A	14–6
French Open	A	A	A	QF	A	1R	A	3R	A	W	A	A	SF	2R	2R	SF	3R	A	A	16–8
Wimbledon	1R	A	A	QF	A	A	A	A	1R	3R	3R	1R	W	2R	W	W	1R	A	1R	25–9
US Open	2R	A	A	A	A	A	A	A	A	2R	F	W	A	A	QF	2R	A	A	A	14–5
