= 1994 Australian Open =

- Date: 17–30 January 1994
- Edition: 82nd
- Category: Grand Slam (ITF)
- Surface: Hardcourt (Rebound Ace)
- Location: Melbourne, Australia
- Venue: National Tennis Centre at Flinders Park

Champions

Men's singles
- (United States) Pete Sampras

Women's singles
- (Germany) Steffi Graf

Men's doubles
- (Netherlands) Jacco Eltingh / (Netherlands) Paul Haarhuis

Women's doubles
- (United States) Gigi Fernández / (Belarus) Natasha Zvereva

Mixed doubles
- (Latvia) Larisa Neiland / (Russia) Andrei Olhovskiy

Boys' singles
- (Australia) Ben Ellwood

Girls' singles
- (Australia) Trudi Musgrave

Boys' doubles
- (Australia) Ben Ellwood / (Australia) Mark Philippoussis

Girls' doubles
- (United States) Corina Morariu / (Czech Republic) Ludmila Varmužová
- Australian Open

The 1994 Australian Open (also known as the 1994 Ford Australian Open for sponsorship purposes) was a tennis tournament played on outdoor hard courts at Flinders Park in Melbourne in Victoria in Australia. It was the 82nd edition of the Australian Open and was held from 17 to 30 January 1994.

== Seniors ==
=== Men's singles ===
(United States) Pete Sampras defeated (United States) Todd Martin 7–6^{(7–4)}, 6–4, 6–4

- It was Sampras' 4th career Grand Slam title and his 1st Australian Open title.

=== Women's singles ===
(Germany) Steffi Graf defeated (Spain) Arantxa Sánchez Vicario 6–0, 6–2

- It was Graf's 15th career Grand Slam title and her 4th and last Australian Open title.

=== Men's doubles ===
(Netherlands) Jacco Eltingh / (Netherlands) Paul Haarhuis defeated (Zimbabwe) Byron Black / (United States) Jonathan Stark 6–7^{(3–7)}, 6–3, 6–4, 6–3

- It was Eltingh's 1st career Grand Slam title and his 1st Australian Open title. It was Haarhuis' 1st career Grand Slam title and his 1st Australian Open title.

=== Women's doubles ===
(United States) Gigi Fernández / (Belarus) Natasha Zvereva defeated (United States) Patty Fendick / (United States) Meredith McGrath 6–3, 4–6, 6–4

- It was Fernández's 10th career Grand Slam title and her 2nd and last Australian Open title. It was Zvereva's 11th career Grand Slam title and her 3rd Australian Open title.

=== Mixed doubles ===
(Latvia) Larisa Neiland / (Russia) Andrei Olhovskiy defeated (Czech Republic) Helena Suková / (Australia) Todd Woodbridge 7–5, 6–7^{(0–7)}, 6–2

- It was Neiland's 4th career Grand Slam title and her 1st Australian Open title. It was Olhovskiy's 2nd and last career Grand Slam title and his only Australian Open title.

== Juniors ==
=== Boys' singles ===
(Australia) Ben Ellwood defeated (Australia) Andrew Ilie 5–7, 6–3, 6–3

=== Girls' singles ===
(Australia) Trudi Musgrave defeated (Austria) Barbara Schett 4–6, 6–4, 6–2

=== Boys' doubles ===
(Australia) Ben Ellwood / (Australia) Mark Philippoussis defeated (United Kingdom) Jamie Delgado / (Slovakia) Roman Kukal 4–6, 6–2, 6–1

=== Girls' doubles ===
(United States) Corina Morariu / (Czech Republic) Ludmila Varmužová defeated (Netherlands) Yvette Basting / (Germany) Alexandra Schneider 7–5, 2–6, 7–5

Preceded by 1993 US Open	Grand Slams	Succeeded by 1994 French Open
