= Steve DeVries =

American tennis player

- Country (sports): United States
- Born: December 8, 1964 (age 61) Cincinnati, Ohio, US
- Height: 5 ft 11 in (1.80 m)
- Turned pro: 1987
- Plays: Right-handed
- Prize money: $584,096

Singles
- Career record: 4–14
- Career titles: 0
- Highest ranking: No. 221 (August 19, 1991)

Doubles
- Career record: 120–141
- Career titles: 4
- Highest ranking: No. 18 (February 22, 1993)

Grand Slam doubles results
- Australian Open: 3R (1993)
- French Open: 3R (1991)
- Wimbledon: 3R (1992)
- US Open: QF (1991)

Mixed doubles
- Career titles: 0

Grand Slam mixed doubles results
- Australian Open: 1R (1991, 1992, 1993, 1994)
- French Open: 3R (1992)
- Wimbledon: 3R (1991)
- US Open: QF (1992)

Steve DeVries (born December 8, 1964) is a former professional tennis player from the United States.

DeVries enjoyed most of his tennis success while playing doubles. During his career he won 4 doubles titles and finished runner-up an additional 5 times. He achieved a career-high doubles ranking of world no. 18 in 1993. During his tour days DeVries lived in San Mateo, California. Steve is currently the Head Tennis Professional at Green Valley Country Club in Fairfield, California.

== ATP Tour finals ==
=== Doubles: 9 (4 wins / 5 losses) ===
Result	W/L	Date	Tournament	Surface	Partner	Opponents	Score
Loss	0–1	Mar 1991	Rotterdam, Netherlands	Carpet	(Australia) David Macpherson	(United States) Patrick Galbraith (Sweden) Anders Järryd	6–7, 2–6
Loss	0–2	Oct 1991	Lyon, France	Carpet	(Australia) David Macpherson	(Netherlands) Tom Nijssen (Czech Republic) Cyril Suk	6–7, 3–6
Win	1–2	Mar 1992	Indian Wells, U.S.	Hard	(Australia) David Macpherson	(United States) Kent Kinnear (United States) Sven Salumaa	4–6, 6–3, 6–3
Win	2–2	May 1992	Atlanta, U.S.	Clay	(Australia) David Macpherson	(United States) Mark Keil (United States) Dave Randall	6–3, 6–3
Win	3–2	May 1992	Charlotte, U.S.	Clay	(Australia) David Macpherson	(United States) Bret Garnett (United States) Jared Palmer	6–4, 7–6
Win	4–2	Oct 1992	Brisbane, Australia	Hard (i)	(Australia) David Macpherson	(United States) Patrick McEnroe (United States) Jonathan Stark	6–4, 6–4
Loss	4–3	Nov 1992	Stockholm, Sweden	Carpet	(Australia) David Macpherson	(Australia) Todd Woodbridge (Australia) Mark Woodforde	3–6, 4–6
Loss	4–4	Feb 1993	Stuttgart Indoor, Germany	Carpet	(Australia) David Macpherson	(Australia) Mark Kratzmann (Australia) Wally Masur	3–6, 6–7
Loss	4–5	Aug 1993	New Haven, U.S.	Hard	(Australia) David Macpherson	(Czech Republic) Cyril Suk (Czech Republic) Daniel Vacek	3–6, 6–7
