= 1993 Wimbledon Championships – Men's doubles qualifying =

Men's doubles qualifying
- 1993 Wimbledon Championships

Events
Singles	men	women		boys	girls
Doubles	men	women	mixed	boys	girls
WC Singles	men	women	quad
WC Doubles	men	women	quad
Legends	men	women	seniors

Qualification
Singles	men	women
Doubles	men	women
- Wimbledon Championships

Players and pairs who neither have high enough rankings nor receive wild cards may participate in a qualifying tournament held one week before the annual Wimbledon Tennis Championships.

== Seeds ==
1. (Latvia) Ģirts Dzelde / (Australia) Carl Limberger (first round)
2. (South Africa) Lan Bale / (Australia) Andrew Kratzmann (qualified)
3. (India) Leander Paes / (Italy) Laurence Tieleman (qualified)
4. (United States) Brian Devening / (The Bahamas) Roger Smith (first round)
5. (United States) Tommy Ho / (Australia) Pat Rafter (qualifying competition)
6. (South Africa) Ellis Ferreira / (United States) Richard Schmidt (second round)
7. (Italy) Nicola Bruno / (United States) Brian Joelson (second round)
8. (South Africa) David Nainkin / (South Africa) Grant Stafford (first round)
9. (Argentina) Roberto Saad / (Kenya) Paul Wekesa (qualifying competition)
10. (Germany) Patrick Baur / (Netherlands) Fernon Wibier (first round)

== Qualifiers ==
1. (Germany) Alex Rădulescu / (Sweden) Mikael Stadling
2. (South Africa) Lan Bale / (Australia) Andrew Kratzmann
3. (India) Leander Paes / (Italy) Laurence Tieleman
4. (Argentina) Juan Garat / (Hungary) Sándor Noszály
5. (United States) David DiLucia / (United States) Brian MacPhie

== Qualifying draw ==
=== First qualifier ===
First round
1	(Latvia) Ģirts Dzelde (Australia) Carl Limberger	2	4
(Germany) Alex Rădulescu (Sweden) Mikael Stadling	6	6
(United Kingdom) Darren Kirk (Australia) Brent Larkham	6	6
(South Africa) Clinton Lamprecht (South Africa) Jack Steyn	2	2
WC	(Sweden) Niclas Kroon (Sweden) Peter Lundgren	6	7^{7}
(Canada) Martin Laurendeau (Canada) Chris Pridham	3	6^{4}
(United States) Martin Blackman (Israel) Gilad Bloom	7^{7}	7^{7}
8	(South Africa) David Nainkin (South Africa) Grant Stafford	6^{3}	6^{4}

Second round
(Germany) Alex Rădulescu (Sweden) Mikael Stadling	1	6	10
(United Kingdom) Darren Kirk (Australia) Brent Larkham	6	4	8
WC	(Sweden) Niclas Kroon (Sweden) Peter Lundgren	4	0
(United States) Martin Blackman (Israel) Gilad Bloom	6	6

Qualifying competition
(Germany) Alex Rădulescu (Sweden) Mikael Stadling	3	7^{7}	6
(United States) Martin Blackman (Israel) Gilad Bloom	6	6^{3}	4

=== Second qualifier ===
First round
2	(South Africa) Lan Bale (Australia) Andrew Kratzmann	6	6
(Australia) Stephen Gleeson (Australia) Jamie Holmes	2	3
(Czech Republic) Ctislav Doseděl (United States) Michael Joyce	6	6
(South Africa) Brent Haygarth (South Africa) Robbie Koenig	3	4
(Canada) Albert Chang (Brazil) Fabio Silberberg	3	6	8
(South Africa) Neville Godwin (South Africa) Gareth Williams	6	3	10
(United States) Doug Flach (United States) David Witt	7^{7}	7^{7}
10	(Germany) Patrick Baur (Netherlands) Fernon Wibier	6^{3}	6^{4}

Second round
2	(South Africa) Lan Bale (Australia) Andrew Kratzmann	6	6
(Czech Republic) Ctislav Doseděl (United States) Michael Joyce	4	3
(South Africa) Neville Godwin (South Africa) Gareth Williams	6^{4}	6	2
(United States) Doug Flach (United States) David Witt	7^{7}	3	6

Qualifying competition
2	(South Africa) Lan Bale (Australia) Andrew Kratzmann	7^{7}	6
(United States) Doug Flach (United States) David Witt	6^{4}	3

=== Third qualifier ===
First round
3/ WC	(India) Leander Paes (Italy) Laurence Tieleman	6	6
(India) Anand Amritraj (India) Srinivasan Vasudevan	4	3
(Colombia) Mauricio Hadad (Colombia) Miguel Tobón	4	6	6
(United Kingdom) Nick Gould (United Kingdom) Laurence Matthews	6	3	4
(Australia) Wayne Arthurs (Australia) Grant Doyle	6	6
(United Kingdom) Jeffrey Hunter (United Kingdom) Danny Sapsford	2	4
(Ecuador) Pablo Campana (South Africa) Clinton Marsh	3	5
9	(Argentina) Roberto Saad (Kenya) Paul Wekesa	6	7

Second round
3/ WC	(India) Leander Paes (Italy) Laurence Tieleman	6	7^{7}
(Colombia) Mauricio Hadad (Colombia) Miguel Tobón	3	6^{4}
(Australia) Wayne Arthurs (Australia) Grant Doyle	6^{6}	6^{2}
9	(Argentina) Roberto Saad (Kenya) Paul Wekesa	7^{8}	7^{7}

Qualifying competition
3/ WC	(India) Leander Paes (Italy) Laurence Tieleman	6	7^{9}
9	(Argentina) Roberto Saad (Kenya) Paul Wekesa	3	6^{7}

=== Fourth qualifier ===
First round
4	(United States) Brian Devening (The Bahamas) Roger Smith	2	4
(Canada) Sébastien Lareau (Canada) Daniel Nestor	6	6
(Germany) Dirk Dier (Sweden) Tomas Nydahl	3	4
(South Africa) Brendan Curry (South Africa) Kevin Ullyett	6	6
(Venezuela) Alfonso Mora (Canada) Greg Rusedski	4	6	3
(Argentina) Juan Garat (Hungary) Sándor Noszály	6	3	6
(Germany) Peter Moraing (Germany) Stephan Rhode	w/o
6	(South Africa) Ellis Ferreira (United States) Richard Schmidt

Second round
(Canada) Sébastien Lareau (Canada) Daniel Nestor	5	6	18
(South Africa) Brendan Curry (South Africa) Kevin Ullyett	7	4	20
(Argentina) Juan Garat (Hungary) Sándor Noszály	3	6	12
6	(South Africa) Ellis Ferreira (United States) Richard Schmidt	6	3	10

Qualifying competition
(South Africa) Brendan Curry (South Africa) Kevin Ullyett	6	6^{5}	4
(Argentina) Juan Garat (Hungary) Sándor Noszály	4	7^{7}	6

=== Fifth qualifier ===
First round
5	(United States) Tommy Ho (Australia) Pat Rafter	6	6^{2}	6
(United Kingdom) Colin Beecher (United Kingdom) Nick Fulwood	4	7^{7}	3
(United Kingdom) Martin Adebisi (United States) Darryl Hale	3	3
(Israel) Michael Daniel (United States) Louis Gloria	6	6
(Australia) Heath Denman (Australia) Paul Kilderry	6^{1}	4
(United States) David DiLucia (United States) Brian MacPhie	7^{7}	6
(United Kingdom) Jamie Delgado (United Kingdom) Tom Spinks	3	6^{7}
7	(Italy) Nicola Bruno (United States) Brian Joelson	6	7^{9}

Second round
5	(United States) Tommy Ho (Australia) Pat Rafter	6	7^{7}
(Israel) Michael Daniel (United States) Louis Gloria	3	6^{5}
(United States) David DiLucia (United States) Brian MacPhie	7	6
7	(Italy) Nicola Bruno (United States) Brian Joelson	5	3

Qualifying competition
5	(United States) Tommy Ho (Australia) Pat Rafter	3	6^{5}
(United States) David DiLucia (United States) Brian MacPhie	6	7^{7}
