= 1993 Wimbledon Championships – Women's singles qualifying =

Women's singles qualifying
- 1993 Wimbledon Championships

Events
Singles	men	women		boys	girls
Doubles	men	women	mixed	boys	girls
WC Singles	men	women	quad
WC Doubles	men	women	quad
Legends	men	women	seniors

Qualification
Singles	men	women
Doubles	men	women
- Wimbledon Championships

Players and pairs who neither have high enough rankings nor receive wild cards may participate in a qualifying tournament held one week before the annual Wimbledon Tennis Championships.

== Seeds ==
1. (Australia) Jenny Byrne (qualifying competition, lucky loser)
2. (Australia) Rennae Stubbs (withdrew)
3. (Japan) Yone Kamio (first round)
4. (South Africa) Tessa Price (qualified)
5. (Paraguay) Rossana de los Ríos (first round)
6. (Netherlands) Nicole Muns-Jagerman (second round)
7. (Italy) Laura Golarsa (qualified)
8. (Japan) Misumi Miyauchi (first round)
9. (Netherlands) Claire Wegink (qualified)
10. (United States) Katrina Adams (first round)
11. (Netherlands) Monique Kiene (first round)
12. (Australia) Kristin Godridge (first round)
13. (Japan) Ai Sugiyama (qualified)
14. (Finland) Petra Thorén First round)
15. (New Zealand) Julie Richardson (second round)
16. (United States) Meredith McGrath (qualified)

== Qualifiers ==
1. (South Africa) Dinky van Rensburg
2. (Netherlands) Claire Wegink
3. (South Africa) Tessa Price
4. (United States) Cammy MacGregor
5. (Italy) Laura Golarsa
6. (Japan) Ai Sugiyama
7. (United States) Meredith McGrath
8. (Australia) Kirrily Sharpe

== Lucky losers ==
1. (Australia) Jenny Byrne
2. (Germany) Marketa Kochta
3. (Australia) Louise Field

== Qualifying draw ==
=== First qualifier ===
First round
1	(Australia) Jenny Byrne	6	6
(Australia) Joanne Limmer	0	1
(Slovenia) Tina Križan	6	7^{10}
(Australia) Tracey Morton	4	6^{8}
(South Africa) Dinky van Rensburg	4	6	6
(United States) Julie Steven	6	1	0
(Czech Republic) Eva Švíglerová	2	4
15	(New Zealand) Julie Richardson	6	6

Second round
1	(Australia) Jenny Byrne	7	6
(Slovenia) Tina Križan	5	3
(South Africa) Dinky van Rensburg	5	6	6
15	(New Zealand) Julie Richardson	7	3	4

Qualifying competition
1	(Australia) Jenny Byrne	6^{5}	3
(South Africa) Dinky van Rensburg	7^{7}	6

=== Second qualifier ===
First round
9	(Netherlands) Claire Wegink	6	6
WC	(United Kingdom) Julie Salmon	4	4
WC	(United Kingdom) Lucie Ahl	7	6
(United States) Patti O'Reilly	5	2
(United States) Elise Burgin	1	3
(Germany) Marketa Kochta	6	6
(Argentina) Mercedes Paz	5	7^{7}	6
8	(Japan) Misumi Miyauchi	7	6^{2}	2

Second round
9	(Netherlands) Claire Wegink	6	6
WC	(United Kingdom) Lucie Ahl	4	4
(Germany) Marketa Kochta	6^{6}	6	6
(Argentina) Mercedes Paz	7^{8}	0	2

Qualifying competition
9	(Netherlands) Claire Wegink	4	7^{7}	6
(Germany) Marketa Kochta	6	6^{2}	2

=== Third qualifier ===
First round
4	(South Africa) Tessa Price	2	7	6
(Germany) Silvia Freye	6	5	2
(United States) Jessica Emmons	3	6	6
(Netherlands) Linda Niemantsverdriet	6	1	4
(United States) Tammy Whittington	6	6
(Paraguay) Larissa Schaerer	4	3
(Japan) Maya Kidowaki	6^{3}	6	6
12	(Australia) Kristin Godridge	7^{7}	4	1

Second round
4	(South Africa) Tessa Price	6	6
(United States) Jessica Emmons	2	2
(United States) Tammy Whittington	6	6
(Japan) Maya Kidowaki	4	1

Qualifying competition
4	(South Africa) Tessa Price	7^{7}	6
(United States) Tammy Whittington	6^{4}	2

=== Fourth qualifier ===
First round
14	(Finland) Petra Thorén	2	5
WC	(United Kingdom) Valda Lake	6	7
(Russia) Ekaterina Makarova	3	2
(Belgium) Laurence Courtois	6	6
(Belgium) Ann Devries	3	2
(United States) Cammy MacGregor	6	6
(Italy) Elena Savoldi	6	6
5	(Paraguay) Rossana de los Ríos	0	3

Second round
WC	(United Kingdom) Valda Lake	5	4
(Belgium) Laurence Courtois	7	6
(United States) Cammy MacGregor	6	6
(Italy) Elena Savoldi	4	3

Qualifying competition
(Belgium) Laurence Courtois	6^{2}	3
(United States) Cammy MacGregor	7^{7}	6

=== Fifth qualifier ===
First round
7	(Italy) Laura Golarsa	6	6
(Germany) Sabine Lohmann	1	0
(Australia) Nicole Pratt	6^{2}	6	6
(United States) Donna Faber	7^{7}	1	1
WC	(United States) Betsy Nagelsen	6	6
WC	(United Kingdom) Alison Smith	3	2
(France) Sophie Amiach	6	5	6
10	(United States) Katrina Adams	1	7	3

Second round
7	(Italy) Laura Golarsa	6	6
(Australia) Nicole Pratt	0	3
(United States) Betsy Nagelsen	6^{6}	4
(France) Sophie Amiach	7^{8}	6

Qualifying competition
7	(Italy) Laura Golarsa	6	2	7
(France) Sophie Amiach	3	6	5

=== Sixth qualifier ===
First round
13	(Japan) Ai Sugiyama	6	6
(France) Sylvie Sabas	4	2
WC	(United Kingdom) Lizzie Jelfs	4	6	3
WC	(United Kingdom) Emily Bond	6	4	6
(United States) Sandy Collins	6^{4}	2
(Japan) Masako Yanagi	7^{7}	6
(United States) Erika deLone	6	6
3	(Japan) Yone Kamio	2	0

Second round
13	(Japan) Ai Sugiyama	6^{5}	6	6
WC	(United Kingdom) Emily Bond	7^{7}	4	3
(Japan) Masako Yanagi	6	1	4
(United States) Erika deLone	3	6	6

Qualifying competition
13	(Japan) Ai Sugiyama	7	6
(United States) Erika deLone	5	1

=== Seventh qualifier ===
First round
6	(Netherlands) Nicole Muns-Jagerman	6	6
(Argentina) Cristina Tessi	4	2
(Italy) Rita Grande	3	1
(Japan) Ayako Hirose	6	6
(Australia) Kristine Radford	6	6
(Germany) Andrea Müller	4	2
WC	(United Kingdom) Caroline Billingham	4	1
16	(United States) Meredith McGrath	6	6

Second round
6	(Netherlands) Nicole Muns-Jagerman	6^{5}	4
(Japan) Ayako Hirose	7^{7}	6
(Australia) Kristine Radford	5	5
16	(United States) Meredith McGrath	7	7

Qualifying competition
(Japan) Ayako Hirose	1	3
16	(United States) Meredith McGrath	6	6

=== Eighth qualifier ===
First round
11	(Netherlands) Monique Kiene	3	6	3
(Australia) Kirrily Sharpe	6	4	6
(Sweden) Maria Strandlund	5	4
(South Korea) Park Sung-hee	7	6
(United States) Ann Henricksson	3	6	4
(United States) Shannan McCarthy	6	2	6
(Sweden) Åsa Carlsson	3	4
(Australia) Louise Field	6	6

Second round
(Australia) Kirrily Sharpe	6	6
(South Korea) Park Sung-hee	3	0
(United States) Shannan McCarthy	4	6^{6}
(Australia) Louise Field	6	7^{8}

Qualifying competition
(Australia) Kirrily Sharpe	7^{7}	6
(Australia) Louise Field	6^{5}	3
