= 1993 Wimbledon Championships – Men's singles qualifying =

Men's singles qualifying
- 1993 Wimbledon Championships

Events
Singles	men	women		boys	girls
Doubles	men	women	mixed	boys	girls
WC Singles	men	women	quad
WC Doubles	men	women	quad
Legends	men	women	seniors

Qualification
Singles	men	women
Doubles	men	women
- Wimbledon Championships

Players and pairs who neither have high enough rankings nor receive wild cards may participate in a qualifying tournament held one week before the annual Wimbledon Tennis Championships.

== Seeds ==
1. (Sweden) Jonas Björkman (first round)
2. (United States) Kenny Thorne (second round)
3. (Canada) Chris Pridham (second round)
4. (Germany) Jörn Renzenbrink (first round)
5. (Colombia) Mauricio Hadad (first round)
6. (Germany) Patrick Baur (qualifying competition)
7. (Canada) Andrew Sznajder (qualifying competition)
8. (Israel) Gilad Bloom (first round)
9. (Germany) Christian Saceanu (qualifying competition)
10. (United States) Chris Garner (first round)
11. (Italy) Laurence Tieleman (qualified)
12. (Canada) Greg Rusedski (qualified)
13. (United States) David Witt (qualifying competition)
14. (Germany) Dirk Dier (second round)
15. (United States) Dave Randall (qualified)
16. (Venezuela) Maurice Ruah (first round)
17. (France) Jean-Philippe Fleurian (first round)
18. (Brazil) Fernando Roese (first round)
19. (Australia) Pat Rafter (qualified)
20. (Canada) Sébastien Lareau (qualified)
21. (Sweden) Tomas Nydahl (qualifying competition)
22. (Ukraine) Dimitri Poliakov (second round)
23. (South Africa) David Nainkin (qualified)
24. (Sweden) Jan Apell (second round)
25. (United States) Steve Bryan (qualified)
26. (South Africa) Lan Bale (first round)
27. (The Bahamas) Roger Smith (first round)
28. (Australia) Simon Youl (qualified)
29. (India) Leander Paes (first round)
30. (Brazil) Danilo Marcelino (first round)
31. (South Africa) Gary Muller (qualifying competition)
32. (The Bahamas) Mark Knowles (qualifying competition)

== Qualifiers ==
1. (Australia) Grant Doyle
2. (United States) Brian Joelson
3. (United States) Brian Devening
4. (Netherlands) Fernon Wibier
5. (United States) Todd Nelson
6. (Australia) Simon Youl
7. (Germany) Peter Moraing
8. (United States) Steve Bryan
9. (South Africa) David Nainkin
10. (United States) Mark Keil
11. (Italy) Laurence Tieleman
12. (Canada) Greg Rusedski
13. (Canada) Sébastien Lareau
14. (Australia) Pat Rafter
15. (United States) Dave Randall
16. (Australia) Paul Kilderry

== Qualifying draw ==
=== First qualifier ===
First round
1	(Sweden) Jonas Björkman	3	6	4
(Australia) Grant Doyle	6	2	6
(Spain) Tati Rascón	3	4
(Australia) Andrew Kratzmann	6	6
(Germany) Florian Krumrey	2	2
(United States) Doug Flach	6	6
(Sweden) Peter Lundgren	6	6	18
31	(South Africa) Gary Muller	4	7	20

Second round
(Australia) Grant Doyle	6	6
(Australia) Andrew Kratzmann	3	2
(United States) Doug Flach	4	6
31	(South Africa) Gary Muller	6	7

Qualifying competition
(Australia) Grant Doyle	7	6
31	(South Africa) Gary Muller	6	2

=== Second qualifier ===
First round
2	(United States) Kenny Thorne	4	6	6
(Spain) Álex López Morón	6	3	5
(United States) Brian Joelson	6	7	6
(South Africa) Clinton Marsh	7	6	3
(Canada) Daniel Nestor	6	7	6
(United States) Brian MacPhie	7	6	3
(Czech Republic) Václav Roubíček	3	1
32	(The Bahamas) Mark Knowles	6	6

Second round
2	(United States) Kenny Thorne	3	6	9
(United States) Brian Joelson	6	3	11
(Canada) Daniel Nestor	4	6
32	(The Bahamas) Mark Knowles	6	7

Qualifying competition
(United States) Brian Joelson	6	7
32	(The Bahamas) Mark Knowles	3	6

=== Third qualifier ===
First round
3	(Canada) Chris Pridham	6	6	9
WC	(United Kingdom) Jeffrey Hunter	4	7	7
(United States) Brian Devening	6	7
(Australia) Heath Denman	4	5
(Germany) Markus Zillner	6	4
(United States) Richard Schmidt	7	6
(United States) Scott Davis	7	6
30	(Brazil) Danilo Marcelino	6	2

Second round
3	(Canada) Chris Pridham	3	4
(United States) Brian Devening	6	6
(United States) Richard Schmidt	6	6	8
(United States) Scott Davis	7	3	10

Qualifying competition
(United States) Brian Devening	6	6	6
(United States) Scott Davis	3	7	3

=== Fourth qualifier ===
First round
4	(Germany) Jörn Renzenbrink	5	6	3
(Argentina) Juan Garat	7	4	6
(Netherlands) Hendrik Jan Davids	3	7	7
(Argentina) Roberto Saad	6	5	5
(Colombia) Miguel Tobón	7	7
(Spain) Jordi Mas	6	5
(Netherlands) Fernon Wibier	3	7	6
29	(India) Leander Paes	6	6	3

Second round
(Argentina) Juan Garat	2	6	6
(Netherlands) Hendrik Jan Davids	6	4	4
(Colombia) Miguel Tobón	2	4
(Netherlands) Fernon Wibier	6	6

Qualifying competition
(Argentina) Juan Garat	6	4
(Netherlands) Fernon Wibier	7	6

=== Fifth qualifier ===
First round
5	(Colombia) Mauricio Hadad	4	6
(Canada) Albert Chang	6	7
(Italy) Vincenzo Santopadre	7	3	4
(United States) Todd Nelson	6	6	6
(South Africa) Piet Norval	6	6	6
(United States) Brad Pearce	4	7	1
(Germany) Stephan Rhode	7	7
27	(The Bahamas) Roger Smith	6	5

Second round
(Canada) Albert Chang	6	6	1
(United States) Todd Nelson	4	7	6
(South Africa) Piet Norval	6	4
(Germany) Stephan Rhode	7	6

Qualifying competition
(United States) Todd Nelson	6	7
(Germany) Stephan Rhode	2	5

=== Sixth qualifier ===
First round
6	(Germany) Patrick Baur	4	6	6
(Sweden) Thomas Högstedt	6	1	3
(South Africa) Kevin Ullyett	7	7
(Latvia) Ģirts Dzelde	5	6
(United States) Ryan Blake	6	6
(Colombia) Jaime Cortés	2	4
(Sweden) Mikael Stadling	1	2
28	(Australia) Simon Youl	6	6

Second round
6	(Germany) Patrick Baur	2	6	6
(South Africa) Kevin Ullyett	6	3	4
(United States) Ryan Blake	1	4
28	(Australia) Simon Youl	6	6

Qualifying competition
6	(Germany) Patrick Baur	6	2
28	(Australia) Simon Youl	7	6

=== Seventh qualifier ===
First round
7	(Canada) Andrew Sznajder	6	6
(Norway) Christian Ruud	2	4
(Italy) Nicola Bruno	6	7	5
(United Kingdom) Neil Broad	7	6	7
(Italy) Filippo Grasso	3	5
WC	(United Kingdom) Laurence Matthews	6	7
(Germany) Peter Moraing	6	7
26	(South Africa) Lan Bale	4	5

Second round
7	(Canada) Andrew Sznajder	7	6	7
(United Kingdom) Neil Broad	6	7	5
WC	(United Kingdom) Laurence Matthews	1	7	2
(Germany) Peter Moraing	6	6	6

Qualifying competition
7	(Canada) Andrew Sznajder	3	2
(Germany) Peter Moraing	6	6

=== Eighth qualifier ===
First round
8	(Israel) Gilad Bloom	6	2
(United States) Louis Gloria	7	6
(Denmark) Frederik Fetterlein	3	6	6
(Israel) Michael Daniel	6	3	4
(Cuba) Mario Tabares	1	4
(United States) Martin Blackman	6	6
(India) Ramesh Krishnan	7	4	4
25	(United States) Steve Bryan	6	6	6

Second round
(United States) Louis Gloria	7	6
(Denmark) Frederik Fetterlein	5	2
(United States) Martin Blackman	6	1
25	(United States) Steve Bryan	7	6

Qualifying competition
(United States) Louis Gloria	1	6
25	(United States) Steve Bryan	6	7

=== Ninth qualifier ===
First round
9	(Germany) Christian Saceanu	5	6	8
WC	(United Kingdom) Danny Sapsford	7	4	6
(Sweden) Peter Nyborg	7	3	6
(South Africa) Marius Barnard	6	6	3
(South Africa) Neville Godwin	6	6
(South Africa) Robbie Koenig	3	3
WC	(United Kingdom) Gary Henderson	4	6	3
23	(South Africa) David Nainkin	6	2	6

Second round
9	(Germany) Christian Saceanu	6	7
(Sweden) Peter Nyborg	3	6
(South Africa) Neville Godwin	7	1	4
23	(South Africa) David Nainkin	5	6	6

Qualifying competition
9	(Germany) Christian Saceanu	6	5
23	(South Africa) David Nainkin	7	7

=== Tenth qualifier ===
First round
10	(United States) Chris Garner	2	4
(United States) Mark Keil	6	6
(United States) David DiLucia	6	6
(United States) Kelly Jones	3	2
(United States) Alex Reichel	6	5
(Brazil) Fabio Silberberg	7	7
(Hungary) Sándor Noszály	5	4
24	(Sweden) Jan Apell	7	6

Second round
(United States) Mark Keil	7	6	6
(United States) David DiLucia	6	7	4
(Brazil) Fabio Silberberg	3	6	10
24	(Sweden) Jan Apell	6	4	8

Qualifying competition
(United States) Mark Keil	3	7	8
(Brazil) Fabio Silberberg	6	6	6

=== Eleventh qualifier ===
First round
11	(Italy) Laurence Tieleman	6	6	6
(Austria) Thomas Prerovsky	4	7	3
(Netherlands) Tom Nijssen	6	1
(United States) Kent Kinnear	7	6
(France) Guillaume Marx	6	2	6
(United States) Paul Annacone	3	6	4
(United Kingdom) Alex Rădulescu	3	3
21	(Sweden) Tomas Nydahl	6	6

Second round
11	(Italy) Laurence Tieleman	6	7
(United States) Kent Kinnear	2	6
(France) Guillaume Marx	3	3
21	(Sweden) Tomas Nydahl	6	6

Qualifying competition
11	(Italy) Laurence Tieleman	6	6
21	(Sweden) Tomas Nydahl	3	4

=== Twelfth qualifier ===
First round
12	(Canada) Greg Rusedski	7	7
(Australia) Wayne Arthurs	6	6
(Canada) Martin Laurendeau	1	4
(Australia) Carl Limberger	6	6
(Ivory Coast) Clement N'Goran	7	7
WC	(Australia) Mark Kratzmann	6	5
(United Kingdom) Andrew Richardson	4	3
22	(Ukraine) Dimitri Poliakov	6	6

Second round
12	(Canada) Greg Rusedski	6	6	6
(Australia) Carl Limberger	7	3	4
(Ivory Coast) Clement N'Goran	6	6
22	(Ukraine) Dimitri Poliakov	4	4

Qualifying competition
12	(Canada) Greg Rusedski	6	7
(Ivory Coast) Clement N'Goran	3	6

=== Thirteenth qualifier ===
First round
13	(United States) David Witt	7	4	6
(Morocco) Karim Alami	6	6	4
(Australia) Stephen Gleeson	6	4	3
WC	(United Kingdom) Tim Henman	4	6	6
(United States) Michael Joyce	6	6
(Sweden) Patrik Albertsson	3	3
(Argentina) Carlos Tarantino	1	3
20	(Canada) Sébastien Lareau	6	6

Second round
13	(United States) David Witt	6	6
WC	(United Kingdom) Tim Henman	3	2
(United States) Michael Joyce	2	4
20	(Canada) Sébastien Lareau	6	6

Qualifying competition
13	(United States) David Witt	6	2	1
20	(Canada) Sébastien Lareau	3	6	6

=== Fourteenth qualifier ===
First round
14	(Germany) Dirk Dier	7	6
(Portugal) Nuno Marques	6	4
WC	(United Kingdom) Colin Beecher	6	6
(United States) David Pate	4	3
WC	(United Kingdom) Jamie Delgado	6	7	2
(Spain) Álex Calatrava	7	6	6
(Kenya) Paul Wekesa	5	6	3
19	(Australia) Pat Rafter	7	4	6

Second round
14	(Germany) Dirk Dier	6	3
WC	(United Kingdom) Colin Beecher	7	6
(Spain) Álex Calatrava	4	2
19	(Australia) Pat Rafter	6	6

Qualifying competition
WC	(United Kingdom) Colin Beecher	4	2
19	(Australia) Pat Rafter	6	6

=== Fifteenth qualifier ===
First round
15	(United States) Dave Randall	7	2	6
(Ecuador) Pablo Campana	5	6	3
(Australia) Brent Larkham	6	6
(South Africa) David Adams	3	4
(United Kingdom) Nick Gould	6	6	5
(Sweden) Ola Kristiansson	4	7	6
(France) Stéphane Huet	6	3	6
18	(Brazil) Fernando Roese	3	6	2

Second round
15	(United States) Dave Randall	6	6
(Australia) Brent Larkham	3	3
(Sweden) Ola Kristiansson	6	6	6
(France) Stéphane Huet	7	4	2

Qualifying competition
15	(United States) Dave Randall	6	6
(Sweden) Ola Kristiansson	4	4

=== Sixteenth qualifier ===
First round
16	(Venezuela) Maurice Ruah	3	6	4
WC	(United Kingdom) Paul Hand	6	3	6
(Sweden) Niclas Kroon	7	6
(Belgium) Fabien Cousin	5	2
(Australia) Paul Kilderry	6	6
(India) Srinivasan Vasudevan	3	4
(South Africa) Ellis Ferreira	6	7
17	(France) Jean-Philippe Fleurian	2	6

Second round
WC	(United Kingdom) Paul Hand	7	3	6
(Sweden) Niclas Kroon	6	6	3
(Australia) Paul Kilderry	7	6
(South Africa) Ellis Ferreira	6	3

Qualifying competition
WC	(United Kingdom) Paul Hand	4	6	3
(Australia) Paul Kilderry	6	2	6
