= 1993 Wimbledon Championships – Boys' singles =

Boys' singles
- 1993 Wimbledon Championships

Final
- Champion: (Romania) Răzvan Sabău
- Runner-up: (Venezuela) Jimy Szymanski
- Score: 6–1, 6–3

Events
Singles	men	women		boys	girls
Doubles	men	women	mixed	boys	girls
WC Singles	men	women	quad
WC Doubles	men	women	quad
Legends	men	women	seniors
← 1992 ·	Wimbledon Championships	· 1994 →

Răzvan Sabău defeated Jimy Szymanski in the final, 6–1, 6–3 to win the boys' singles tennis title at the 1993 Wimbledon Championships.

== Seeds ==
1. (South Africa) Neville Godwin (second round)
2. (United States) Paul Goldstein (first round)
3. (Germany) Lars Burgsmüller (quarterfinals)
4. (Germany) Lars Rehmann (third round)
5. (Slovakia) Filip Kaščák (first round)
6. (France) Nicolas Escudé (semifinals)
7. (Venezuela) Jimy Szymanski (final)
8. (New Zealand) Steven Downs (second round)
9. (Romania) Răzvan Sabău (champion)
10. (Australia) James Sekulov (second round)
11. (Brazil) Gustavo Kuerten (third round)
12. (Argentina) Sebastián Prieto (first round)
13. (Netherlands) Dennis van Scheppingen (second round)
14. (Argentina) Franco Squillari (first round)
15. (United Kingdom) James Baily (second round)
16. (United States) Jason Appel (quarterfinals)

Click on the seed number of a player to go to their draw section.

== Draw ==
=== Key ===
- Q = Qualifier
- WC = Wild card
- LL = Lucky loser
- Alt = Alternate
- SE = Special exempt
- PR = Protected ranking
- ITF = ITF entry
- JE = Junior exempt
- w/o = Walkover
- r = Retired
- d = Defaulted
- SR = Special ranking

=== Finals ===
Quarterfinals
16	(United States) Jason Appel	2	6
7	(Venezuela) Jimy Szymanski	6	7
3	(Germany) Lars Burgsmüller	5	7	3
6	(France) Nicolas Escudé	7	6	6
(Czech Republic) Jiří Novák	2	6
(Australia) Ben Ellwood	6	7
9	(Romania) Răzvan Sabău	6	6
(Switzerland) Alexandre Strambini	2	1

Semifinals
7	(Venezuela) Jimy Szymanski	7	7
6	(France) Nicolas Escudé	6	5
(Australia) Ben Ellwood	2	7	3
(Romania) Răzvan Sabău	6	6	6

Final
7	(Venezuela) Jimy Szymanski	1	3
(Romania) Răzvan Sabău	6	6

=== Top half ===
==== Section 1 ====
First round
1	(South Africa) Neville Godwin	6	6
(Nigeria) Ganiyu Adenekan	2	1
(Israel) Eyal Erlich	5	6	10
(Netherlands) Rogier Wassen	7	3	12
(Argentina) Leonardo Olguín	6	7
(United Kingdom) Tom Spinks	3	6
(Thailand) Sarawuth Yongchantanasukul	2	4
16	(United States) Jason Appel	6	6
10	(Australia) James Sekulov	6	6
(Germany) Christian Vinck	2	3
(New Zealand) James Greenhalgh	6	3	6
(Mexico) Ricardo Rosas	3	6	3
(Ivory Coast) Nouhoun Sangare	5	3
(Indonesia) Suwandi Suwandi	7	6
(Norway) Helge Koll-Frafjord	7	4	3
7	(Venezuela) Jimy Szymanski	6	6	6

Second round
1	(South Africa) N Godwin	3	6	2
(Netherlands) R Wassen	6	1	6
(Argentina) L Olguín	2	6	0
16	(United States) J Appel	6	3	6
10	(Australia) J Sekulov	3	2
(New Zealand) J Greenhalgh	6	6
(Indonesia) S Suwandi	4	7	4
7	(Venezuela) Jimy Szymanski	6	5	6

Third round
(Netherlands) R Wassen	6	4	4
16	(United States) J Appel	2	6	6
(New Zealand) J Greenhalgh	6	6
7	(Venezuela) Jimy Szymanski	7	7

Quarterfinals
16	(United States) Jason Appel	2	6
7	(Venezuela) Jimy Szymanski	6	7

==== Section 2 ====
First round
3	(Germany) Lars Burgsmüller	6	6
(Pakistan) Asim Shafik	3	1
(United Kingdom) Luke Milligan	3	5
(United States) Jimmy Jackson	6	7
(Austria) Robert Witz	7	6
(United Kingdom) Lee Sabin	6	2
(Japan) Satoshi Iwabuchi	4	6	6
14	(Argentina) Franco Squillari	6	3	4
11	(Brazil) Gustavo Kuerten	6	6
(Slovakia) Tomáš Čatár	3	4
(Australia) Andrew Ilie	6	6	6
(Slovakia) Martin Hromec	3	7	1
(Ecuador) Nicolás Lapentti	6	6
(Sweden) Magnus Norman	4	4
(Czech Republic) Jan Stoces	4	2
6	(France) Nicolas Escudé	6	6

Second round
3	(Germany) L Burgsmüller	7	6
(United States) J Jackson	6	1
(Austria) R Witz	6	3	4
(Japan) S Iwabuchi	3	6	6
11	(Brazil) G Kuerten	6	7
(Australia) A Ilie	2	6
(Ecuador) N Lapentti	4	0
6	(France) N Escudé	6	6

Third round
3	(Germany) L Burgsmüller	6	6
(Japan) S Iwabuchi	2	3
11	(Brazil) G Kuerten	0	6
6	(France) N Escudé	6	7

Quarterfinals
3	(Germany) L Burgsmüller	5	7	3
6	(France) N Escudé	7	6	6

=== Bottom half ===
==== Section 3 ====
First round
5	(Slovakia) Filip Kaščák	5	2
(Japan) Takao Suzuki	7	6
(Hong Kong) Sven Koehler	4	6	3
(Ivory Coast) Claude N'Goran	6	3	6
(Czech Republic) Jiří Novák	7	7
(United Kingdom) Matthew Coombs	5	6
(United States) Scott Humphries	6	6
12	(Argentina) Sebastián Prieto	4	4
13	(Netherlands) Dennis van Scheppingen	6	6
(Jamaica) Robin Lumsden	0	1
(Brazil) Vítor Martins	3	4
(Australia) Ben Ellwood	6	6
(Brazil) Pedro Zannoni	6	5	3
(Mexico) José Jorge Esqueda Hernández	4	7	6
(United Kingdom) James Fox	3	3
4	(Germany) Lars Rehmann	6	6

Second round
(Japan) T Suzuki	5	4
(Ivory Coast) C N'Goran	7	6
(Czech Republic) J Novák	6	6
(United States) S Humphries	3	4
13	(Netherlands) D van Scheppingen	5	3
(Australia) B Ellwood	7	6
(Mexico) JJ Esqueda Hernández	3	4
4	(Germany) L Rehmann	6	6

Third round
(Ivory Coast) C N'Goran	1	2
(Czech Republic) J Novák	6	6
(Australia) B Ellwood	6	6
(Germany) L Rehmann	4	4

Quarterfinals
(Czech Republic) J Novák	2	6
(Australia) B Ellwood	6	7

==== Section 4 ====
First round
8	(New Zealand) Steven Downs	7	6
(Slovakia) Roman Kukal	5	4
(United Kingdom) Jamie Delgado	4^{r}
(Canada) Bobby Kokavec	5
(France) Grégory Carraz	6	6
(Germany) Christian Tambue	2	4
(Ghana) Daniel Omaboe	2	6
9	(Romania) Răzvan Sabău	6	7
15	(United Kingdom) James Baily	7	4	6
(Indonesia) Champy Halim	6	6	4
(United Kingdom) Paul Martin	6	7
(Hungary) Attila Sávolt	2	6
(Thailand) Atip Chotiyarnwong	2	3
(United States) John Roddick	6	6
(Switzerland) Alexandre Strambini	6	6
2	(United States) Paul Goldstein	3	2

Second round
8	(New Zealand) S Downs	3	6
(United Kingdom) J Delgado	6	7
(France) G Carraz	0	1
9	(Romania) R Sabău	6	6
15	(United Kingdom) J Baily	1	6	5
(United Kingdom) P Martin	6	4	7
(United States) J Roddick	4	6
(Switzerland) A Strambini	6	7

Third round
(United Kingdom) J Delgado	2	5
9	(Romania) R Sabău	6	7
(United Kingdom) P Martin	2	6	4
(Switzerland) A Strambini	6	3	6

Quarterfinals
9	(Romania) R Sabău	6	6
(Switzerland) A Strambini	2	1
