= 1993 Wimbledon Championships – Boys' doubles =

Boys' doubles
- 1993 Wimbledon Championships

Final
- Champions: (New Zealand) Steven Downs (New Zealand) James Greenhalgh
- Runners-up: (South Africa) Neville Godwin (South Africa) Gareth Williams
- Score: 6–7^{(6–8)}, 7–6^{(7–4)}, 7–5

Events
Singles	men	women		boys	girls
Doubles	men	women	mixed	boys	girls
WC Singles	men	women	quad
WC Doubles	men	women	quad
Legends	men	women	seniors
← 1992 ·	Wimbledon Championships	· 1994 →

Steven Downs and James Greenhalgh defeated Neville Godwin and Gareth Williams in the final, 6–7^{(6–8)}, 7–6^{(7–4)}, 7–5 to win the boys' doubles tennis title at the 1993 Wimbledon Championships.

== Seeds ==
The top seed received a bye into the second round.

1. (New Zealand) Steven Downs / (New Zealand) James Greenhalgh (champions)
2. (South Africa) Neville Godwin / (South Africa) Gareth Williams (final)
3. (Brazil) Gustavo Kuerten / (Ecuador) Nicolás Lapentti (second round)
4. (United States) Scott Humphries / (United States) Jimmy Jackson (quarterfinals)
5. (Germany) Lars Rehmann / (Germany) Christian Tambue (quarterfinals)
6. (Argentina) Sebastián Prieto / (Venezuela) Jimy Szymanski (semifinals)
7. (Australia) Ben Ellwood / (Hong Kong) Sven Koehler (quarterfinals)
8. (Australia) Andrew Ilie / (Australia) James Sekulov (first round)

== Draw ==
=== Key ===
- Q = Qualifier
- WC = Wild card
- LL = Lucky loser
- Alt = Alternate
- SE = Special exempt
- PR = Protected ranking
- ITF = ITF entry
- JE = Junior exempt
- w/o = Walkover
- r = Retired
- d = Defaulted
- SR = Special ranking

=== Finals ===
Semifinals
1	(New Zealand) Steven Downs (New Zealand) James Greenhalgh	5	6	6
(United States) Jason Appel (United States) John Roddick	7	2	3
6	(Argentina) Sebastián Prieto (Venezuela) Jimy Szymanski	6	4	3
2	(South Africa) Neville Godwin (South Africa) Gareth Williams	4	6	6

Final
1	(New Zealand) Steven Downs (New Zealand) James Greenhalgh	6^{6}	7^{7}	7
2	(South Africa) Neville Godwin (South Africa) Gareth Williams	7^{8}	6^{4}	5

=== Top half ===
First round
(Slovakia) Roman Kukal (Czech Republic) Jiří Novák	6	7^{7}
(United Kingdom) Jonathan Hind (United Kingdom) Gareth Jones	3	6^{3}
(Nigeria) Ganiyu Adenekan (Ghana) Daniel Omaboe
(Argentina) Leonardo Olguín (Argentina) Franco Squillari	w/o
(Indonesia) Champy Halim (Indonesia) Suwandi Suwandi	3	6^{6}
7	(Australia) Ben Ellwood (Hong Kong) Sven Koehler	6	7^{8}
3	(Brazil) Gustavo Kuerten (Ecuador) Nicolás Lapentti	6	6
(United Kingdom) Jamie Fallis (Jamaica) Robin Lumsden	1	1
(United Kingdom) James Baily (Israel) Eyal Erlich	3	6^{3}
(United States) Jason Appel (United States) John Roddick	6	7
(Romania) Răzvan Sabău (Czech Republic) Jan Stoces	7^{10}	5	4
(United Kingdom) Jamie Delgado (United Kingdom) Tom Spinks	6^{8}	7	6
(Mexico) José Jorge Esqueda Hernández (Mexico) Ricardo Rosas	4	2
5	(Germany) Lars Rehmann (Germany) Christian Tambue	6	6

Second round
1	(New Zealand) Steven Downs (New Zealand) James Greenhalgh	6^{5}	6	6
(Slovakia) R Kukal (Czech Republic) J Novák	7^{7}	2	4
(Nigeria) G Adenekan (Ghana) D Omaboe	3	3
7	(Australia) B Ellwood (Hong Kong) S Koehler	6	6
3	(Brazil) G Kuerten (Ecuador) N Lapentti	5	1
(United States) J Appel (United States) J Roddick	7	6
(United Kingdom) J Delgado (United Kingdom) T Spinks	4	4
5	(Germany) L Rehmann (Germany) C Tambue	6	6

Quarterfinals
1	(New Zealand) S Downs (New Zealand) J Greenhalgh	6	7^{8}
7	(Australia) B Ellwood (Hong Kong) S Koehler	4	6^{6}
(United States) J Appel (United States) J Roddick	6	1	6
5	(Germany) L Rehmann (Germany) C Tambue	2	6	3

Semifinals
1	(New Zealand) S Downs (New Zealand) J Greenhalgh	5	6	6
(United States) J Appel (United States) J Roddick	7	2	3

=== Bottom half ===
First round
6	(Argentina) Sebastián Prieto (Venezuela) Jimy Szymanski	6	6
(Hungary) Attila Sávolt (Austria) Robert Witz	4	3
(Netherlands) Dennis van Scheppingen (Netherlands) Rogier Wassen	7^{7}	3	6
(United Kingdom) Lee Sabin (Pakistan) Asim Shafik	6^{4}	6	1
(United Kingdom) Paul Martin (United Kingdom) Luke Milligan	6	4	12
(Ivory Coast) Claude N'Goran (Ivory Coast) Nouhoun Sangare	2	6	10
(France) Nicolas Escudé (Switzerland) Alexandre Strambini	w/o
4	(United States) Scott Humphries (United States) Jimmy Jackson
8	(Australia) Andrew Ilie (Australia) James Sekulov	3	4
(Japan) Satoshi Iwabuchi (Japan) Takao Suzuki	6	6
(Germany) Lars Burgsmüller (Germany) Christian Vinck	4	6	13
(Slovakia) Tomáš Čatár (Slovakia) Martin Hromec	6	4	11
(United Kingdom) Matthew Coombs (United Kingdom) James Fox	4	7	6
(Brazil) Vítor Martins (Brazil) Pedro Zannoni	6	5	4
(Thailand) Atip Chotiyarnwong (Thailand) Sarawuth Yongchantanasukul	1	0
2	(South Africa) Neville Godwin (South Africa) Gareth Williams	6	6

Second round
6	(Argentina) S Prieto (Venezuela) J Szymanski	7	6
(Netherlands) D van Scheppingen (Netherlands) R Wassen	5	4
(United Kingdom) P Martin (United Kingdom) L Milligan	1	3
4	(United States) S Humphries (United States) J Jackson	6	6
(Japan) S Iwabuchi (Japan) T Suzuki	6	7^{7}
(Germany) L Burgsmüller (Germany) C Vinck	2	6^{4}
(United Kingdom) M Coombs (United Kingdom) J Fox	1	7^{8}	2
2	(South Africa) N Godwin (South Africa) G Williams	6	6^{6}	6

Quarterfinals
6	(Argentina) S Prieto (Venezuela) J Szymanski	7	6^{2}	16
4	(United States) S Humphries (United States) J Jackson	5	7^{7}	14
(Japan) S Iwabuchi (Japan) T Suzuki	6^{1}	3
2	(South Africa) N Godwin (South Africa) G Williams	7^{7}	6

Semifinals
6	(Argentina) S Prieto (Venezuela) J Szymanski	6	4	3
2	(South Africa) N Godwin (South Africa) G Williams	4	6	6
