= Darren Kirk =

British tennis player

- Country (sports): United Kingdom
- Born: 23 July 1968 (age 56); Lincolnshire, England

Singles
- Career record: 0–1
- Highest ranking: No. 650 (9 Mar 1992)

Grand Slam singles results
- Wimbledon: Q1 (1989, 1992)

Doubles
- Highest ranking: No. 261 (20 Jul 1992)

Grand Slam doubles results
- Wimbledon: Q2 (1993)

Darren Kirk (born 23 July 1968) is a British former professional tennis player.

Kirk, who comes from Lincolnshire, reached a best singles ranking of 650 and made a main draw appearance at the 1988 Bristol Open, as well as in qualifiers for Wimbledon. He was ranked as high as 261 in the world for doubles and won an ATP Challenger doubles title in Bristol in 1992, beating a pairing of Leander Paes/Kevin Ullyett en route.

== ATP Challenger titles ==
=== Doubles: (1) ===
No.	Date	Tournament	Surface	Partner	Opponents	Score
1.	Jul 1992	Bristol Challenger; Bristol, England	Grass	(Australia) Brent Larkham	(United States) Kent Kinnear (Sweden) Peter Nyborg	3–6, 7–6, 6–4
