= 1993 Australian Open =

- Date: 18–31 January 1993
- Edition: 81st
- Category: Grand Slam (ITF)
- Surface: Hardcourt (Rebound Ace)
- Location: Melbourne, Australia
- Venue: National Tennis Centre at Flinders Park

Champions

Men's singles
- (United States) Jim Courier

Women's singles
- (Federal Republic of Yugoslavia) Monica Seles

Men's doubles
- (South Africa) Danie Visser / (Australia) Laurie Warder

Women's doubles
- (United States) Gigi Fernández / (Belarus) Natasha Zvereva

Mixed doubles
- (Spain) Arantxa Sánchez Vicario / (Australia) Todd Woodbridge

Boys' singles
- (United Kingdom) James Baily

Girls' singles
- (Germany) Heike Rusch

Boys' doubles
- (Germany) Lars Rehmann / (Germany) Christian Tambue

Girls' doubles
- (Switzerland) Joana Manta / (Czech Republic) Ludmila Richterová
- Australian Open

The 1993 Australian Open was a tennis tournament played on outdoor hard courts at Flinders Park in Melbourne in Victoria in Australia. It was the 81st edition of the Australian Open and was held from 18 through 31 January 1993.

== Seniors ==
=== Men's singles ===
(United States) Jim Courier defeated (Sweden) Stefan Edberg 6–2, 6–1, 2–6, 7–5

- It was Courier's 4th and last career Grand Slam title and his 2nd Australian Open title.

=== Women's singles ===
(Federal Republic of Yugoslavia) Monica Seles defeated (Germany) Steffi Graf 4–6, 6–3, 6–2

- It was Seles' 8th career Grand Slam title and her 3rd Australian Open title.

=== Men's doubles ===
(South Africa) Danie Visser / (Australia) Laurie Warder defeated (Australia) John Fitzgerald / (Sweden) Anders Järryd 6–4, 6–3, 6–4

- It was Visser's 3rd and last career Grand Slam title and his 2nd Australian Open title. It was Warder's only career Grand Slam title.

=== Women's doubles ===
(United States) Gigi Fernández / (Belarus) Natasha Zvereva defeated (United States) Pam Shriver / (Australia) Elizabeth Smylie 6–4, 6–3

- It was Fernández's 7th career Grand Slam title and her 1st Australian Open title. It was Zvereva's 7th career Grand Slam title and her 1st Australian Open title.

=== Mixed doubles ===
(Spain) Arantxa Sánchez Vicario / (Australia) Todd Woodbridge defeated (United States) Zina Garrison-Jackson / (United States) Rick Leach 7–5, 6–4

- It was Sánchez Vicario's 5th career Grand Slam title and her 2nd Australian Open title. It was Woodbridge's 3rd career Grand Slam title and his 2nd Australian Open title.

== Juniors ==
=== Boys' singles ===
(United Kingdom) James Baily defeated (New Zealand) Steven Downs 6–3, 6–2

=== Girls' singles ===
(Germany) Heike Rusch defeated (Germany) Andrea Glass 6–1, 6–2

=== Boys' doubles ===
(Germany) Lars Rehmann / (Germany) Christian Tambue defeated (United States) Scott Humphries / (United States) Jimmy Jackson 6–7, 7–5, 6–2

=== Girls' doubles ===
(Switzerland) Joana Manta / (Czech Republic) Ludmila Richterová defeated (Sweden) Åsa Carlsson / (Romania) Cătălina Cristea 6–3, 6–2

== Prize money ==
Event		W	F	SF	QF	4R	3R	2R	1R
Singles	Men	A$410,000	A$205,000	A$102,500	A$53,400	A$28,700	A$16,500	A$10,000	A$6,200
Singles	Women	A$410,000	A$205,000	A$102,500	A$53,400	A$28,700	A$16,500	A$10,000	A$6,200

Total prize money for the event was A$6,455,000.

Preceded by 1992 US Open	Grand Slams	Succeeded by 1993 French Open
