= ATP Zaragoza =

Defunct tennis tournament
- Event name: Torneo Ciudad de Zaragoza
- Tour: ATP Tour
- Founded: 1993
- Abolished: 1994
- Editions: 2
- Location: Zaragoza, Spain
- Venue: Pabellón Príncipe Felipe
- Surface: Carpet / indoor

The ATP Zaragoza was a men's tennis tournament played in Zaragoza, Spain played on indoor carpet courts. The event was played as part of the ATP Tour in 1993 and 1994 at Pabellón Príncipe Felipe, following an indoor hard challenger at the same venue in 1992 (the challenger event had previously been held on clay at Real Zaragoza Club de Tenis since 1984).

== Champions ==
=== Singles ===
Year	Champions	Runners-up	Score
1993	(Czech Republic) Karel Nováček	(Sweden) Jonas Svensson	3–6, 6–2, 6–1
1994	(Sweden) Magnus Larsson	(Germany) Lars Rehmann	6–4, 6–4

=== Doubles ===
Year	Champions	Runners-up	Score
1993	(Czech Republic) Martin Damm (Czech Republic) Karel Nováček	(United States) Mike Bauer (Czech Republic) David Rikl	2–6, 6–4, 7–5
1994	(Sweden) Henrik Holm (Sweden) Anders Järryd	(Czech Republic) Martin Damm (Czech Republic) Karel Nováček	7–5, 6–2
