= 1993 Wimbledon Championships – Girls' doubles =

Girls' doubles
- 1993 Wimbledon Championships

Final
- Champions: (Belgium) Laurence Courtois (Belgium) Nancy Feber
- Runners-up: (Japan) Hiroko Mochizuki (Japan) Yuka Yoshida
- Score: 6–3, 6–4

Events
Singles	men	women		boys	girls
Doubles	men	women	mixed	boys	girls
WC Singles	men	women	quad
WC Doubles	men	women	quad
Legends	men	women	seniors
← 1992 ·	Wimbledon Championships	· 1994 →

Laurence Courtois and Nancy Feber defeated Hiroko Mochizuki and Yuka Yoshida in the final, 6–3, 6–4 to win the girls' doubles tennis title at the 1993 Wimbledon Championships.

== Seeds ==
1. (Belgium) Laurence Courtois / (Belgium) Nancy Feber (champions)
2. (United States) Cristina Moros / (United States) Julie Steven (quarterfinals)
3. (Ecuador) María Dolores Campana / (Chile) Bárbara Castro (second round)
4. (South Korea) Park Sung-hee / (Indonesia) Romana Tedjakusuma (semifinals)
5. (Japan) Hiroko Mochizuki / (Japan) Yuka Yoshida (final)
6. (Paraguay) Magalí Benítez / (Argentina) María Landa (quarterfinals)
7. (United Kingdom) Julie Pullin / (United Kingdom) Lorna Woodroffe (quarterfinals)
8. (Switzerland) Martina Hingis / (Switzerland) Joana Manta (semifinals)

== Draw ==
=== Key ===
- Q = Qualifier
- WC = Wild card
- LL = Lucky loser
- Alt = Alternate
- SE = Special exempt
- PR = Protected ranking
- ITF = ITF entry
- JE = Junior exempt
- w/o = Walkover
- r = Retired
- d = Defaulted
- SR = Special ranking

=== Finals ===
Semifinals
1	(Belgium) Laurence Courtois (Belgium) Nancy Feber	2	6	6
4	(South Korea) Park Sung-hee (Indonesia) Romana Tedjakusuma	6	4	2
5	(Japan) Hiroko Mochizuki (Japan) Yuka Yoshida	5	6	8
8	(Switzerland) Martina Hingis (Switzerland) Joana Manta	7	3	6

Final
1	(Belgium) Laurence Courtois (Belgium) Nancy Feber	6	6
5	(Japan) Hiroko Mochizuki (Japan) Yuka Yoshida	3	4

=== Top half ===
First round
1	(Belgium) Laurence Courtois (Belgium) Nancy Feber	6	6
(South Korea) Choi Young-ja (South Korea) Shin Hyun-a	4	4
(Georgia (country)) Anastasia Pozdniakova (Switzerland) Manuela Schwerzmann	3	3
(Zimbabwe) Cara Black (Mozambique) Laura Nhavene	6	6
(United States) Amanda Basica (Chinese Taipei) Janet Lee	6	6
(United Kingdom) Tina Croson (United Kingdom) Sara Tse	3	4
(Philippines) Francesca La'O (India) Nirupama Vaidyanathan	1	1
7	(United Kingdom) Julie Pullin (United Kingdom) Lorna Woodroffe	6	6
4	(South Korea) Park Sung-hee (Indonesia) Romana Tedjakusuma	7	6
(United Kingdom) Lizzie Jelfs (United Kingdom) Katia Roubanova	5	1
(United Kingdom) Frances Hearn (United Kingdom) Zoe Mellis	3	4
(Slovakia) Zuzana Nemšáková (Czechoslovakia) Ludmila Richterová	6	6
(Mexico) Sophie Cortina (Thailand) Sirilux Mingmolee	6	6
(Brazil) Miriam D'Agostini (Argentina) Mariana Lopez	3	3
(Hungary) Zsófia Csapó (Thailand) Pimpisamai Kansuthi	4	3
6	(Paraguay) Magalí Benítez (Argentina) María Landa	6	6

Second round
1	(Belgium) L Courtois (Belgium) N Feber	6	6
(Zimbabwe) C Black (Mozambique) L Nhavene	4	2
(United States) A Basica (Chinese Taipei) J Lee	4	0
7	(United Kingdom) J Pullin (United Kingdom) L Woodroffe	6	6
4	(South Korea) S-h Park (Indonesia) R Tedjakusuma	7	6
(Slovakia) Z Nemšáková (Czechoslovakia) L Richterová	5	0
(Mexico) S Cortina (Thailand) S Mingmolee	6	5	1
6	(Paraguay) M Benítez (Argentina) M Landa	4	7	6

Quarterfinals
1	(Belgium) L Courtois (Belgium) N Feber	6	7
7	(United Kingdom) J Pullin (United Kingdom) L Woodroffe	2	5
4	(South Korea) S-h Park (Indonesia) R Tedjakusuma	1	6	6
6	(Paraguay) M Benítez (Argentina) M Landa	6	3	2

Semifinals
1	(Belgium) L Courtois (Belgium) N Feber	2	6	6
4	(South Korea) S-h Park (Indonesia) R Tedjakusuma	6	4	2

=== Bottom half ===
First round
5	(Japan) Hiroko Mochizuki (Japan) Yuka Yoshida	6	6
(South Africa) Estelle Gevers (South Africa) Liezel Horn	2	0
(Czech Republic) Lenka Cenková (Czechoslovakia) Gabriela Netíková	6	6
(United Kingdom) Elizabeth Fletcher (United Kingdom) Candy Reid	3	1
(United Kingdom) Claire Taylor (United Kingdom) Amanda Wainwright	6	6
(South Africa) Leanda Hitge (South Africa) Nannie de Villiers	1	2
(United Kingdom) Laura Austin (Republic of Ireland) Karen Nugent	3	2
3	(Ecuador) María Dolores Campana (Chile) Bárbara Castro	6	6
8	(Switzerland) Martina Hingis (Switzerland) Joana Manta	6	6
(Argentina) Maria Eugenia Abrate (United Kingdom) Megan Miller	1	1
(Netherlands) Maaike Koutstaal (France) Anne Pastor	6	6
(United Kingdom) Heather Matthews (United Kingdom) Jennie McMahon	4	3
(United Kingdom) Mair Hughes (United Kingdom) Katharine Warne-Holland	1	2
(Argentina) Mariana Díaz Oliva (Chinese Taipei) Weng Tzu-ting	6	6
(Georgia (country)) Nino Louarsabishvili (Madagascar) Dally Randriantefy	1	1
2	(United States) Cristina Moros (United States) Julie Steven	6	6

Second round
5	(Japan) H Mochizuki (Japan) Y Yoshida	3	6	6
(Czech Republic) L Cenková (Czechoslovakia) G Netíková	6	4	4
(United Kingdom) C Taylor (United Kingdom) A Wainwright	6^{2}	6	8
3	(Ecuador) MD Campana (Chile) B Castro	7^{7}	3	6
8	(Switzerland) M Hingis (Switzerland) J Manta	6	6
(Netherlands) M Koutstaal (France) A Pastor	3	3
(Argentina) M Díaz Oliva (Chinese Taipei) T-t Weng	5	2
2	(United States) C Moros (United States) J Steven	7	6

Quarterfinals
5	(Japan) H Mochizuki (Japan) Y Yoshida	6	0	6
(United Kingdom) C Taylor (United Kingdom) A Wainwright	1	6	2
8	(Switzerland) M Hingis (Switzerland) J Manta	4	6	6
(United States) C Moros (United States) J Steven	6	1	4

Semifinals
5	(Japan) H Mochizuki (Japan) Y Yoshida	5	6	8
8	(Switzerland) M Hingis (Switzerland) J Manta	7	3	6
