= Candy Reid =

British journalist

Candida Reid (born 1977) is a British journalist who was a sports anchor for CNN International based in Atlanta, GA. She has since returned to the United Kingdom where she coaches youth tennis and serves as a tennis commentator on television video world feeds of Association of Tennis Professionals (ATP) lower tier tournaments such as ATP 250 events, as well as world feeds of Women's Tennis Association (WTA) events.

== Early life ==
Reid was an international junior tennis player. She represented England and the United Kingdom at Under 18 level and competed at Junior Wimbledon. Reid played on the Satellite Tour after leaving school and achieved a world ranking in both singles and doubles. Reid then went to the University of Tennessee in Knoxville on a full-tennis scholarship from 1996–2000 and graduated with a degree in broadcasting and a minor in economics. Beforehand she went to Sutton High School in Sutton, England. Her father was a stock-broker, her mother a former professional dancer.

== Broadcasting career ==
Candy Reid began her career with CNN International in Atlanta in 2000 as an Associate Producer before becoming a sports anchor in 2002. She has interviewed many huge international sports personalities such as Roger Federer, Rafael Nadal, Serena Williams, Steffi Graf, Martina Navratilova, Tiger Woods, Phil Mickelson and Jenson Button. She left CNN International in 2011 in order to launch her tennis coaching academy business.

10 years after she left CNN International, Candy Reid-Harrop resumed her sports television broadcasting career in 2021 as a tennis commentator for the world feeds of the Association of Tennis Professionals (ATP) and Women's Tennis Association (WTA). She usually commentates off monitor (a.k.a. "off tube") from Gravity Media White City, UK. Her voice is heard regularly on Tennis Channel in the United States when it relays the ATP world feed straight through for lower tier tournaments such as ATP 250 events.
