= Stephan Rhode =

German tennis player

- Country (sports): West Germany; Germany
- Born: 5 October 1968 (age 56); Essen, West Germany
- Height: 6 ft 2 in (188 cm)
- Prize money: $18,181

Singles
- Career record: 1–1
- Highest ranking: No. 274 (5 October 1992)

Grand Slam singles results
- Australian Open: Q1 (1993)
- French Open: Q1 (1993)
- Wimbledon: Q3 (1993)

Stephan Rhode (born 5 October 1968) is a German former professional tennis player.

Rhode, who comes from Essen, turned professional in 1989.

His best performance on the ATP Tour came at the Swiss Open in 1992, where he beat Andrei Medvedev to make the second round. He reached his career best ranking that year of 274 in the world.

In 1993 he featured in the qualifying draws for the Australian Open, French Open and Wimbledon.
