= Steven Downs =

New Zealand tennis player (born 1975)

- Full name: Steven Downs
- Country (sports): New Zealand
- Born: 8 September 1975 (age 51) Auckland, New Zealand
- Height: 1.83 m (6 ft 0 in)
- Turned pro: 1994
- Retired: 1997
- Plays: Right-handed
- Prize money: $50,607

Singles
- Career record: 4–8
- Career titles: 0; 0 Challenger, 0 Futures
- Highest ranking: No. 279 (10 July 1995)

Grand Slam singles results
- Australian Open: Q2 (1996, 1997)
- French Open: Q2 (1995)
- Wimbledon: Q1 (1997)
- US Open: Q2 (1995, 1996)

Doubles
- Career record: 0–4
- Career titles: 0; 0 Challenger, 0 Futures
- Highest ranking: No. 201 (10 April 1995)
- Last updated on: 12 May 2022.

Steven Downs (born 8 September 1975) is a former professional tennis player from New Zealand.

== Biography ==
Downs was a leading international junior, who was the world number one doubles player in 1993 and designated ITF World Champion. He reached a final at all four Grand Slam tournaments in 1993. With partner James Greenhalgh, he won two boys' doubles titles, the French Open and Wimbledon Championships. Downs, who played cricket for Auckland up to the Under 14s, made the singles final at the Australian Open and was runner-up to Marcelo Ríos at the US Open, for a year-end number five ranking.

Following his junior success in 1993, Downs turned professional and in 1994 made his first ATP Tour tournament in Auckland. Every year from 1994 to 1997 he featured in the main draw of the Auckland Open. In 1995 he made the round of 16, with a win over the world's 45th-ranked player, Fabrice Santoro.

During his career he participated in three ties for the New Zealand Davis Cup team. In 1995 he made his debut in a tie against Chinese Taipei in Wellington and won both of his singles matches, in a 5–0 whitewash. He was called up again when New Zealand played a World Group qualifier that year in Hamilton, against Switzerland. His first singles match was the opening rubber of the tie, a loss to Marc Rosset. When he and Alistair Hunt lost in the doubles, the tie was lost, although he did win a reverse singles rubber over Jakob Hlasek. In 1996, he played two more singles matches, in a tie against South Korea in Seoul, for losses to Lee Hyung-taik and Yoon Yong-il, but New Zealand still prevailed.

His last ATP Tour appearance in singles came at the 1996 Infiniti Open in Los Angeles, where he lost in the first round to Stefan Edberg. He was runner-up at a Perth Challenger event in 1996. At his peak, Downs was the second-ranked player in New Zealand, behind Brett Steven. A combination of factors, including an elbow injury, brought about an early retirement from professional tennis after the 1997 season.

== Junior Grand Slam finals ==
=== Singles: 2 (2 runners-up) ===
Result	Year	Tournament	Surface	Opponent	Score
Loss	1993	Australian Open	Hard	(United Kingdom) James Baily	3–6, 2–6
Loss	1993	US Open	Hard	(Chile) Marcelo Ríos	6–7, 3–6

=== Doubles: 2 (2 titles) ===
Result	Year	Tournament	Surface	Partner	Opponents	Score
Win	1993	French Open	Clay	(New Zealand) James Greenhalgh	(South Africa) Neville Godwin (South Africa) Gareth Williams	6–1, 6–1
Win	1993	Wimbledon	Grass	(New Zealand) James Greenhalgh	(South Africa) Neville Godwin (South Africa) Gareth Williams	6–7, 7–6, 7–5

== ATP Challenger and ITF Futures finals ==
=== Singles: 1 (0–1) ===
Legend ATP Challenger (0–1) ITF Futures (0–0)	Finals by surface Hard (0–1) Clay (0–0) Grass (0–0) Carpet (0–0)

Result	W–L	Date	Tournament	Tier	Surface	Opponent	Score
Loss	0–1	Dec 1996	Perth, Australia	Challenger	Hard	(Australia) Richard Fromberg	0–6, 3–6

=== Doubles: 1 (0–1) ===
Legend ATP Challenger (0–1) ITF Futures (0–0)	Finals by surface Hard (0–1) Clay (0–0) Grass (0–0) Carpet (0–0)

Result	W–L	Date	Tournament	Tier	Surface	Partner	Opponents	Score
Loss	0–1	Aug 1995	Bronx, United States	Challenger	Hard	(New Zealand) James Greenhalgh	(Australia) James Holmes (United Kingdom) Ross Matheson	3–6, 7–5, 3–6

== See also ==
- List of New Zealand Davis Cup team representatives
