= Manuela Schwerzmann =

Swiss tennis player

- Country (sports): Switzerland
- Born: 5 August 1976 (age 49)

Singles
- Highest ranking: No. 600 (29 August 1994)

Doubles
- Highest ranking: No. 730 (1 November 1993)

Manuela Schwerzmann (born 5 August 1976) is a Swiss former professional tennis player.

Schwerzmann toured internationally as a junior in 1993 and 1994, during which time she appeared in the occasional professional tournament, but didn't pursue a tennis career beyond this. She played in the juniors at Wimbledon.

In 1994 she featured in a tie for the Switzerland Federation Cup team, against Canada in Frankfurt. Her only appearance came in a doubles dead rubber partnering Miroslava Vavrinec, which they lost to Jill Hetherington and Rene Simpson.

== See also ==
- List of Switzerland Fed Cup team representatives
