= James Greenhalgh =

New Zealand tennis player

- Country (sports): New Zealand
- Born: 19 February 1975 (age 50); Hertfordshire, England, United Kingdom
- Height: 183 cm (6 ft 0 in)
- Plays: Right-handed
- Prize money: $104,001

Singles
- Career record: 3–13
- Career titles: 0
- Highest ranking: No. 327 (14 August 1995)

Grand Slam singles results
- Australian Open: Q1 (1996, 1997)
- Wimbledon: Q3 (1995)
- US Open: Q1 (1995)

Doubles
- Career record: 18-31
- Career titles: 1
- Highest ranking: No. 89 (26 April 1999)

Grand Slam doubles results
- Australian Open: 1R (2000)
- French Open: 1R (1999)
- Wimbledon: 1R (1999)
- US Open: Q2 (1995, 1999)
- Last updated on: 13 May 2022.

James Greenhalgh (born 19 February 1975) is a former professional tennis player from New Zealand.

== Career ==
Greenhalgh, a doubles specialist, was born in England, but at the age of four moved to New Zealand. In his junior career he partnered countryman Steven Downs and the pair were boys' doubles champion at the 1993 French Open and 1993 Wimbledon Championships. They defeated South Africans Neville Godwin and Gareth Williams in both finals.

In 1999, Greenhalgh, with partner Grant Silcock, won the Hong Kong Open. They defeated the experienced pairing of Mark Knowles and Daniel Nestor in the semi-final and won the final in a walkover, after one of their opponents, Andre Agassi, withdrew with a shoulder injury. It would be his only title win on the ATP Tour and meant that he broke into the double's top 100 rankings for the first time. As a singles player, his highest ever ranking was 327, attained in 1995.

Greenhalgh also made two Grand Slam appearances with Silcock, at the French Open and Wimbledon in 1999, failing to progress past the first round in either. His only other Grand Slam match came in the 2000 Australian Open, where he teamed up with German Michael Kohlmann.

He regularly represented the New Zealand Davis Cup team during his career, participating in a total of 15 ties. In singles he had only a 2–9 record, but won 11 of his 13 doubles rubbers, which is a national record. His six doubles wins with Brett Steven makes them the most successful ever pairing for New Zealand in the Davis Cup.

== Junior Grand Slam finals ==
=== Doubles: 2 (2 titles) ===
Result	Year	Championship	Surface	Partner	Opponents	Score
Win	1993	French Open	Clay	(New Zealand) Steven Downs	(South Africa) Neville Godwin (South Africa) Gareth Williams	6–1, 6–1
Win	1993	Wimbledon	Grass	(New Zealand) Steven Downs	(South Africa) Neville Godwin (South Africa) Gareth Williams	6–7, 7–6, 7–5

== ATP career finals ==
=== Doubles: 1 (1 title) ===
Legend Grand Slam Tournaments (0–0) ATP World Tour Finals (0–0) ATP Masters Series (0–0) ATP Championship Series (0–0) ATP World Series (1–0)	Finals by surface Hard (1–0) Clay (0–0) Grass (0–0) Carpet (0–0)	Finals by setting Outdoors (1–0) Indoors (0–0)

Result	W–L	Date	Tournament	Tier	Surface	Partner	Opponents	Score
Win	1–0	Apr 1999	Hong Kong, Hong Kong	International Series	Hard	(Australia) Grant Silcock	(United States) Andre Agassi (United States) David Wheaton	walkover

== ATP Challenger and ITF Futures finals ==
=== Doubles: 6 (3–3) ===
Legend ATP Challenger (2–1) ITF Futures (1–2)	Finals by surface Hard (0–1) Clay (3–2) Grass (0–0) Carpet (0–0)

Result	W–L	Date	Tournament	Tier	Surface	Partner	Opponents	Score
Loss	0–1	Mar 1998	Japan F1, Ishiwa	Futures	Clay	(Australia) Andrew Painter	(United States) Todd Meringoff (United States) Andrew Rueb	4–6, 2–6
Win	1–1	May 1998	Germany F7, Augsburg	Futures	Clay	(Germany) Sascha Bandermann	(Netherlands) Martijn Belgraver (Netherlands) Martin Verkerk	6–3, 6–7, 6–1
Win	2–1	Aug 1998	Sopot, Poland	Challenger	Clay	(Socialist Federal Republic of Yugoslavia) Nenad Zimonjic	(Belarus) Alexander Shvets (Bulgaria) Milen Velev	6–1, 6–3
Win	3–1	Aug 1998	Warsaw, Poland	Challenger	Clay	(Socialist Federal Republic of Yugoslavia) Nenad Zimonjic	(Lebanon) Ali Hamadeh (Sweden) Johan Landsberg	walkover
Loss	3–2	Jul 1999	Scheveningen, Netherlands	Challenger	Clay	(South Africa) Paul Rosner	(Israel) Eyal Ran (Belgium) Tom Vanhoudt	4–6, 4–6
Loss	3–3	Apr 2000	USA F9, Mt. Pleasant	Futures	Hard	(Australia) Grant Doyle	(United States) Gavin Sontag (Canada) Jerry Turek	6–7^{(3–7)}, 5–7
