= 1993 Wimbledon Championships – Girls' singles =

Girls' singles
- 1993 Wimbledon Championships

Final
- Champion: (Belgium) Nancy Feber
- Runner-up: (Italy) Rita Grande
- Score: 7–6^{(7–3)}, 1–6, 6–2

Events
| Singles | men | women | | boys | girls |
| Doubles | men | women | mixed | boys | girls |
| WC Singles | men | women | quad |
| WC Doubles | men | women | quad |
| Legends | men | women | seniors |
| ← 1992 · | Wimbledon Championships | · 1994 → |

Nancy Feber defeated Rita Grande in the final, 6–2, 7–5 to win the girls' singles tennis title at the 1993 Wimbledon Championships.

== Seeds ==
1. (Belgium) Nancy Feber (champion)
2. (Germany) Heike Rusch (quarterfinals)
3. n/a
4. (Indonesia) Romana Tedjakusuma (first round)
5. n/a
6. (South Korea) Park Sung-hee (semifinals)
7. (Italy) Rita Grande (final)
8. (United States) Julie Steven (third round)
9. (Belgium) Laurence Courtois (quarterfinals)
10. n/a
11. (Georgia (country)) Nino Louarsabishvili (quarterfinals)
12. (Chinese Taipei) Janet Lee (third round)
13. (Argentina) Mariana Díaz Oliva (third round)
14. (Switzerland) Martina Hingis (semifinals)
15. (Madagascar) Dally Randriantefy (third round)
16. (Brazil) Miriam D'Agostini (first round)

Click on the seed number of a player to go to their draw section.

== Draw ==
=== Key ===
- Q = Qualifier
- WC = Wild card
- LL = Lucky loser
- Alt = Alternate
- SE = Special exempt
- PR = Protected ranking
- ITF = ITF entry
- JE = Junior exempt
- w/o = Walkover
- r = Retired
- d = Defaulted
- SR = Special ranking

=== Finals ===
Quarterfinals
1 | (Belgium) Nancy Feber | 2 | 6 | 6
9 | (Belgium) Laurence Courtois | 6 | 1 | 1
(Czechoslovakia) Ludmila Richterová | 4 | 7 | 1
6 | (South Korea) Park Sung-hee | 6 | 6 | 6
11 | (Georgia (country)) Nino Louarsabishvili | 5 | 5
14 | (Switzerland) Martina Hingis | 7 | 7
7 | (Italy) Rita Grande | 6 | 2
2 | (Germany) Heike Rusch | 4 | 1^{r}

Semifinals
1 | (Belgium) Nancy Feber | 6 | 3 | 6
6 | (South Korea) Park Sung-hee | 4 | 6 | 1
14 | (Switzerland) Martina Hingis | 2 | 6
7 | (Italy) Rita Grande | 6 | 7

Final
1 | (Belgium) Nancy Feber | 7^{7} | 1 | 6
7 | (Italy) Rita Grande | 6^{3} | 6 | 2

=== Top half ===
==== Section 1 ====
First round
1 | (Belgium) Nancy Feber | 6 | 6
(Mozambique) Laura Nhavene | 4 | 2
(Argentina) María Landa | 3 | 3
(United Kingdom) Lizzie Jelfs | 6 | 6
(Slovakia) Magdaléna Garguláková | 6 | 6
(United Kingdom) Elizabeth Fletcher | 3 | 4
(India) Nirupama Vaidyanathan | 6 | 6
16 | (Brazil) Miriam D'Agostini | 1 | 2
9 | (Belgium) Laurence Courtois | 6 | 6
(Ecuador) María Dolores Campana | 2 | 3
(South Africa) Nannie de Villiers | 2 | 4
(South Korea) Choi Young-ja | 6 | 6
(France) Anne Pastor | 5 | 6 | 6
(United Kingdom) Lorna Woodroffe | 7 | 3 | 1
(Hungary) Zsófia Csapó | 4 | 1
8 | (United States) Julie Steven | 6 | 6

Second round
1 | (Belgium) N Feber | 6 | 6
(United Kingdom) E Jelfs | 1 | 1
(Slovakia) M Garguláková | 3 | 3
(India) N Vaidyanathan | 6 | 6
9 | (Belgium) L Courtois | 6 | 6
(South Korea) Y-j Choi | 2 | 2
(France) A Pastor | 6 | 6
8 | (United States) J Steven | 4 | 3

Third round
1 | (Belgium) N Feber | 6 | 6
(India) N Vaidyanathan | 1 | 2
9 | (Belgium) L Courtois | 6 | 7
(France) A Pastor | 1 | 5

Quarterfinals
1 | (Belgium) N Feber | 2 | 6 | 6
9 | (Belgium) L Courtois | 6 | 1 | 1

==== Section 2 ====
First round
(Argentina) Mariana Lopez | 5 | 2
(Czechoslovakia) Gabriela Netíková | 7 | 6
(Czechoslovakia) Ludmila Richterová | 7 | 6
(United Kingdom) Sara Tse | 5 | 0
(South Africa) Estelle Gevers | 7 | 4 | 1
(United Kingdom) Tina Croson | 5 | 6 | 6
(Switzerland) Joana Manta | 3 | 6 | 4
13 | (Argentina) Mariana Díaz Oliva | 6 | 4 | 6
12 | (Chinese Taipei) Janet Lee | 6 | 6
(Mexico) Sophie Cortina | 3 | 3
(United States) Amanda Basica | 6 | 6
(United Kingdom) Katharine Warne-Holland | 2 | 1
(South Africa) Leanda Hitge | 6 | 6
(Thailand) Pimpisamai Kansuthi | 3 | 1
(Georgia (country)) Anastasia Pozdniakova | 1 | 1
6 | (South Korea) Park Sung-hee | 6 | 6

Second round
(Czechoslovakia) G Netíková | 2 | 2
(Czechoslovakia) L Richterová | 6 | 6
(United Kingdom) T Croson | 4 | 5
13 | (Argentina) M Díaz Oliva | 6 | 7
12 | (Chinese Taipei) J Lee | 6 | 6
(United States) A Basica | 3 | 4
(South Africa) L Hitge | 6 | 4 | 3
6 | (South Korea) S-h Park | 4 | 6 | 6

Third round
(Czechoslovakia) L Richterová | 6 | 7
13 | (Argentina) M Díaz Oliva | 4 | 6
12 | (Chinese Taipei) J Lee | 3 | 2
6 | (South Korea) S-h Park | 6 | 6

Quarterfinals
(Czechoslovakia) L Richterová | 4 | 7 | 1
6 | (South Korea) S-h Park | 6 | 6 | 6

=== Bottom half ===
==== Section 3 ====
First round
(United Kingdom) Megan Miller | 3 | 2
(Philippines) Francesca La'O | 6 | 6
(Japan) Hiroko Mochizuki | 7 | 6
(United Kingdom) Katia Roubanova | 5 | 4
(United Kingdom) Zoe Mellis | 0 | 4
(United Kingdom) Claire Taylor | 6 | 6
(Argentina) Maria Eugenia Abrate | 0 | 0
11 | (Georgia (country)) Nino Louarsabishvili | 6 | 6
14 | (Switzerland) Martina Hingis | 6 | 6
(Czech Republic) Lenka Cenková | 3 | 2
(Paraguay) Magalí Benítez | 3 | 6 | 4
(Slovakia) Zuzana Nemšáková | 6 | 4 | 6
(Germany) Andrea Glass | 6 | 6
(United Kingdom) Julie Pullin | 2 | 2
(Chinese Taipei) Weng Tzu-ting | 6 | 6
4 | (Indonesia) Romana Tedjakusuma | 0 | 2

Second round
(Philippines) F La'O | 6 | 6
(Japan) H Mochizuki | 4 | 3
(United Kingdom) C Taylor | 4 | 6
11 | (Georgia (country)) N Louarsabishvili | 6 | 7
14 | (Switzerland) M Hingis | 6 | 4 | 6
(Slovakia) Z Nemšáková | 1 | 6 | 4
(Germany) A Glass | 3 | 3
(Chinese Taipei) T-t Weng | 6 | 6

Third round
(Philippines) F La'O | 3 | 2
11 | (Georgia (country)) N Louarsabishvili | 6 | 6
14 | (Switzerland) M Hingis | 7 | 6
(Chinese Taipei) T-t Weng | 5 | 3

Quarterfinals
11 | (Georgia (country)) N Louarsabishvili | 5 | 5
14 | (Switzerland) M Hingis | 7 | 7

==== Section 4 ====
First round
7 | (Italy) Rita Grande | 6 | 6
(South Korea) Shin Hyun-a | 1 | 2
(India) Aradhana Reddy | 3 | 5
(Switzerland) Manuela Schwerzmann | 6 | 7
(South Africa) Liezel Horn | 6 | 3 | 2
(United Kingdom) Amanda Wainwright | 3 | 6 | 6
(Japan) Yuka Yoshida | 7 | 6
(United Kingdom) Frances Hearn | 6 | 2
15 | (Madagascar) Dally Randriantefy | 7 | 6
(Thailand) Sirilux Mingmolee | 5 | 2
(United States) Cristina Moros | 6 | 6 | 3
(Netherlands) Maaike Koutstaal | 4 | 7 | 6
(Republic of Ireland) Karen Nugent | 5 | 6 | 5
(Chile) Bárbara Castro | 7 | 2 | 7
(Zimbabwe) Cara Black | 1 | 2
2 | (Germany) Heike Rusch | 6 | 6

Second round
7 | (Italy) R Grande | 6 | 6
(Switzerland) M Schwerzmann | 0 | 0
(United Kingdom) A Wainwright | 6 | 2
(Japan) Y Yoshida | 7 | 6
15 | (Madagascar) D Randriantefy | 3 | 6 | 6
(Netherlands) M Koutstaal | 6 | 2 | 3
(Chile) B Castro | 3 | 0
2 | (Germany) H Rusch | 6 | 6

Third round
7 | (Italy) R Grande | 6 | 6
(Japan) Y Yoshida | 4 | 1
15 | (Madagascar) D Randriantefy | 2 | 3
2 | (Germany) H Rusch | 6 | 6

Quarterfinals
7 | (Italy) R Grande | 6 | 2
2 | (Germany) H Rusch | 4 | 1^{r}
