= Jimy Szymanski =

Venezuelan tennis player (born 1975)

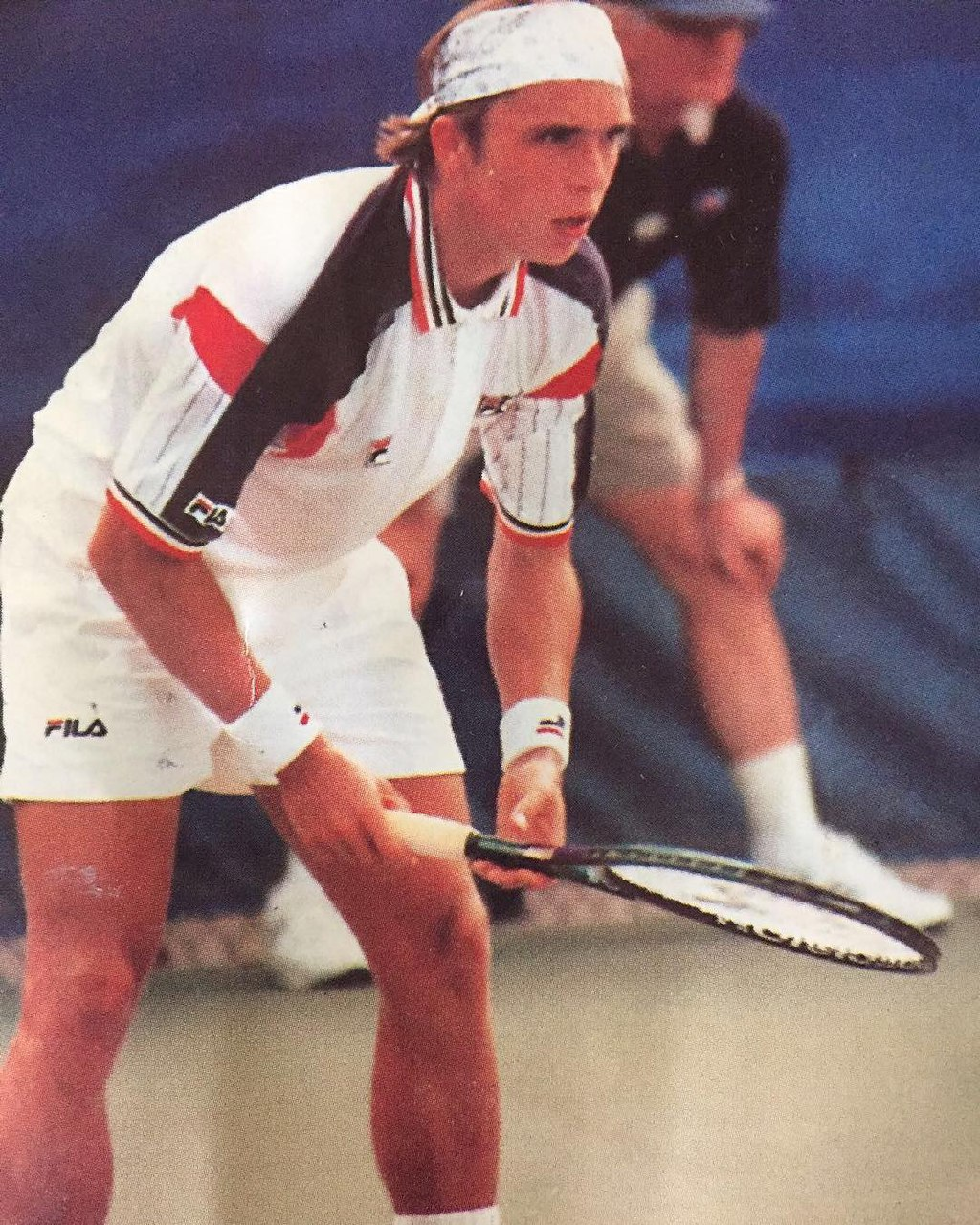
- Country (sports): Venezuela
- Residence: Caracas, Venezuela
- Born: September 15, 1975 (age 50) Caracas, Venezuela
- Height: 1.75 m (5 ft 9 in)
- Turned pro: 1994
- Plays: Right-handed
- Prize money: $194,839

Singles
- Career record: 7–31 (at ATP Tour-level, Grand Slam-level, and in Davis Cup)
- Career titles: 0; 2 Challenger, 6 Futures
- Highest ranking: No. 160 (15 November 1999)

Grand Slam singles results
- French Open: Q2 (2000)
- Wimbledon: Q3 (1994, 2001)
- US Open: 1R {1996, 1997}

Doubles
- Career record: 8–12 (at ATP Tour-level, Grand Slam-level, and in Davis Cup)
- Career titles: 0; 2 Challenger, 2 Futures
- Highest ranking: No. 187 (19 June 2000)

Other doubles tournaments
- Olympic Games: 2R (2000)
Medal record
Men's Tennis
Representing Venezuela
Pan American Games
| Silver medal – second place | 1995 Mar del Plata | Doubles |
| Bronze medal – third place | 1995 Mar del Plata | Singles |
- Last updated on: 1 November 2021.

Jimy Szymanski Ottaviano (born September 15, 1975, in Caracas) is a former tennis player from Venezuela.

He reached his highest junior world ranking of no. 1 in the world in summer 1993. He reached finals in Wimbledon Juniors 1993 and won the Italian Junior world championship in Bonfiglio Milano in 1993. He won the Junior Orange Bowl in doubles in 1993 and finished no. 3 in the juniors world ranking in 1993.

He turned professional in 1994 and reached his highest singles ATP ranking on November 15, 1999, at no. 160.

He played in the ATP tour for more than 10 years and had wins over Fernando González, Nicolás Lapentti, James Blake, Félix Mantilla, Olivier Rochus, Goran Ivanišević, Nicolás Pereira, Horst Skoff, Nuno Marques, Franco Squillari, Jaime Oncins, and Sébastien Lareau.

Szymanski represented his native country at the 1996 Summer Olympics in Atlanta and in 2000 Summer Olympics at Sydney.

As a coach, he worked with Milagros Sequera, Maria Kirilenko, Nadia Petrova, and was Davis Cup captain and Fed Cup captain for his native country.

He is president of STA TENNIS LLC, a company that manages tennis facilities in South Florida.

== Junior Grand Slam finals ==
=== Singles: 1 (1 runner-up) ===
| Result | Year | Tournament | Surface | Opponent | Score |
|---|---|---|---|---|---|
| Loss | 1993 | Wimbledon | Grass | (Romania) Răzvan Sabău | 1–6, 3–6 |

== ATP Challenger and ITF Futures finals ==
=== Singles: 14 (8–6) ===
| Legend ATP Challenger (2–3) ITF Futures (6–3) | Finals by surface Hard (7–5) Clay (1–1) Grass (0–0) Carpet (0–0) |

| Result | W–L | Date | Tournament | Tier | Surface | Opponent | Score |
|---|---|---|---|---|---|---|---|
| Win | 1–0 | Jun 1996 | Szczecin, Poland | Challenger | Clay | (Portugal) Nuno Marques | 2–6, 6–3, 6–3 |
| Win | 2–0 | Mar 1998 | Philippines F1, Manila | Futures | Hard | (Brazil) Richard Brostowicz | 6–2, 6–1 |
| Win | 3–0 | Mar 1998 | Philippines F2, Manila | Futures | Hard | (Greece) Solon Peppas | 6–3, 6–4 |
| Loss | 3–1 | Oct 1999 | Tulsa, United States | Challenger | Hard | (Brazil) André Sá | 2–6, 6–7 |
| Loss | 3–2 | Oct 1999 | Dallas, United States | Challenger | Hard | (Brazil) André Sá | 5–7, 6–4, 4–6 |
| Loss | 3–3 | Jun 2000 | Espinho, Portugal | Challenger | Clay | (Spain) Tommy Robredo | 4–6, 2–6 |
| Win | 4–3 | Oct 2000 | Tulsa, United States | Challenger | Hard | (Netherlands) Raemon Sluiter | 7–6^{(7–5)}, 6–7^{(5–7)}, 7–6^{(7–3)} |
| Loss | 4–4 | Aug 2003 | USA F24, Kenosha | Futures | Hard | (South Africa) Raven Klaasen | 3–6, 3–6 |
| Loss | 4–5 | Sep 2003 | USA F25, Claremont | Futures | Hard | (United States) Glenn Weiner | 3–6, 1–6 |
| Win | 5–5 | Sep 2003 | USA F26, Costa Mesa | Futures | Hard | (Socialist Federal Republic of Yugoslavia) Aleksander Vlaski | 6–4, 7–6^{(7–3)} |
| Win | 6–5 | Sep 2003 | USA F27, Ojai | Futures | Hard | (Socialist Federal Republic of Yugoslavia) Aleksander Vlaski | 7–5, 6–4 |
| Win | 7–5 | Oct 2003 | USA F27A, Laguna Niguel | Futures | Hard | (United States) Robert Yim | 6–2, 6–4 |
| Win | 8–5 | Jul 2005 | Venezuela F2, Caracas | Futures | Hard | (Canada) Dejan Cvetkovic | 6–7^{(5–7)}, 6–4, 6–2 |
| Loss | 8–6 | Aug 2006 | Venezuela F3, Valencia | Futures | Hard | (Mexico) Miguel Gallardo Valles | 3–6, 3–6 |

=== Doubles: 13 (4–9) ===
| Legend ATP Challenger (2–7) ITF Futures (2–2) | Finals by surface Hard (3–3) Clay (1–6) Grass (0–0) Carpet (0–0) |

| Result | W–L | Date | Tournament | Tier | Surface | Partner | Opponents | Score |
|---|---|---|---|---|---|---|---|---|
| Loss | 0–1 | Sep 1996 | Oporto, Portugal | Challenger | Clay | (Portugal) Bernardo Mota | (Portugal) Nuno Marques (Portugal) Emanuel Couto | 7–6, 3–6, 5–7 |
| Loss | 0–2 | May 1997 | Dresden, Germany | Challenger | Clay | (United States) Cecil Mamiit | (United States) Mark Merklein (United States) Jeff Salzenstein | 6–7, 1–6 |
| Loss | 0–3 | Oct 1997 | Lima, Peru | Challenger | Clay | (Belgium) Kris Goossens | (Argentina) Mariano Hood (Argentina) Sebastián Prieto | 2–6, 1–6 |
| Loss | 0–4 | Sep 1998 | Santa Cruz, Bolivia | Challenger | Clay | (Venezuela) Kepler Orellana | (Argentina) Marcelo Charpentier (Argentina) Andrés Schneiter | 2–6, 3–6 |
| Loss | 0–5 | Sep 1998 | Quito, Ecuador | Challenger | Clay | (Venezuela) Kepler Orellana | (Brazil) Adriano Ferreira (Mexico) Óscar Ortiz | 3–6, 4–6 |
| Win | 1–5 | Jul 1999 | Granby, Canada | Challenger | Hard | (United States) Kevin Kim | (Israel) Harel Levy (Israel) Lior Mor | 4–6, 6–1, 6–4 |
| Loss | 1–6 | Dec 1999 | Caracas, Venezuela | Challenger | Clay | (Venezuela) José de Armas | (Argentina) Gastón Etlis (Argentina) Martín Rodríguez | 4–6, 3–6 |
| Loss | 1–7 | Jan 2000 | USA F2, Altamonte Springs | Futures | Hard | (Mexico) Óscar Ortiz | (Israel) Jonathan Erlich (Israel) Harel Levy | 3–6, 4–6 |
| Win | 2–7 | Apr 2000 | San Luis Potosí, Mexico | Challenger | Clay | (Venezuela) José de Armas | (Canada) Jocelyn Robichaud (United States) Michael Sell | 5–7, 6–4, 6–2 |
| Loss | 2–8 | Aug 2004 | Manta, Ecuador | Challenger | Hard | (United States) Eric Nunez | (Brazil) Marcos Daniel (Mexico) Santiago González | 6–3, 2–6, 6–7^{(5–7)} |
| Loss | 2–9 | Jul 2006 | Venezuela F1C, Caracas | Futures | Hard | (Venezuela) Jhonnatan Medina-Álvarez | (Argentina) Alejandro Kon (Argentina) Damian Listingart | walkover |
| Win | 3–9 | Oct 2007 | Venezuela F5, Caracas | Futures | Hard | (Venezuela) José de Armas | (Venezuela) Piero Luisi (Venezuela) Roberto Maytín | 6–7^{(5–7)}, 7–6^{(8–6)}, [10–1] |
| Win | 4–9 | Nov 2007 | Venezuela F7, Caracas | Futures | Hard | (Venezuela) José de Armas | (Venezuela) Miguel Cicenia (Venezuela) Luis David Martínez | 7–6^{(9–7)}, 7–6^{(7–4)} |

== Performance timeline ==
Key
| W | F | SF | QF | #R | RR | Q# | DNQ | A | NH |

(W) winner; (F) finalist; (SF) semifinalist; (QF) quarterfinalist; (#R) rounds 4, 3, 2, 1; (RR) round-robin stage; (Q#) qualification round; (DNQ) did not qualify; (A) absent; (NH) not held; (SR) strike rate (events won / competed); (W–L) win–loss record.

=== Singles ===
| Tournament | 1994 | 1995 | 1996 | 1997 | 1998 | 1999 | 2000 | 2001 | SR | W–L | Win% |
|---|---|---|---|---|---|---|---|---|---|---|---|
Grand Slam tournaments
| Australian Open | A | A | A | A | A | A | A | A | 0 / 0 | 0–0 | – |
| French Open | A | A | A | Q1 | A | A | Q2 | Q1 | 0 / 0 | 0–0 | – |
| Wimbledon | Q3 | A | A | A | A | A | Q1 | Q3 | 0 / 0 | 0–0 | – |
| US Open | A | Q1 | 1R | 1R | A | Q2 | Q1 | A | 0 / 2 | 0–2 | 0% |
| Win–loss | 0–0 | 0–0 | 0–1 | 0–1 | 0–0 | 0–0 | 0–0 | 0–0 | 0 / 2 | 0–2 | 0% |
ATP Tour Masters 1000
| Miami | A | A | Q1 | Q1 | A | A | A | A | 0 / 0 | 0–0 | – |
| Win–loss | 0–0 | 0–0 | 0–0 | 0–0 | 0–0 | 0–0 | 0–0 | 0–0 | 0 / 0 | 0–0 | – |
