= James Baily =

British tennis player

- Full name: James Baily
- Country (sports): Great Britain
- Born: 1 February 1975 (age 50); Portsmouth, United Kingdom

Singles
- Career titles: 0; 0 Challenger, 0 Futures
- Highest ranking: No. 865 (4 October 1993)

Doubles
- Career titles: 0; 0 Challenger, 0 Futures
- Highest ranking: No. 568 (4 July 1994)
- Last updated on: 6 January 2022.

James Baily (born 1 February 1975) is a British former professional tennis player who won the boys' singles title at the 1993 Australian Open.

== Biography ==
Born in Portsmouth, Baily is originally from Curbridge, a village in Hampshire.

At the 1993 Australian Open, a day before his 18th birthday, Baily defeated New Zealander Steven Downs in the boys' singles final. This made him the first British player in 28 years to win a junior grand slam title, since Gerald Battrick in 1965.

Bailey, who was coached by Steve Shaw, couldn't make the transition to professional tennis and appeared only in satellite tournaments, before retiring in 1994.

== Junior Grand Slam finals ==
=== Singles: 1 (1 title) ===
Result	Year	Tournament	Surface	Opponent	Score
Win	1993	Australian Open	Hard	(New Zealand) Steven Downs	6–3, 6–2
