= Lars Rehmann =

German tennis player

- Country (sports): Germany
- Residence: Salzburg, Austria
- Born: 21 May 1975 (age 51) Leverkusen, West Germany
- Height: 1.96 m (6 ft 5 in)
- Turned pro: 1993
- Plays: Right-handed (one-handed backhand)
- Prize money: $271,500

Singles
- Career record: 16–21
- Career titles: 0
- Highest ranking: No. 87 (20 February 1995)

Grand Slam singles results
- Australian Open: 2R (1995)
- French Open: Q2 (1997)
- Wimbledon: Q2 (1994)
- US Open: Q2 (1996)

Doubles
- Career record: 4–10
- Career titles: 0
- Highest ranking: No. 142 (11 July 1994)

Grand Slam doubles results
- Wimbledon: 1R (1994)
- Last updated on: 29 October 2021.

Lars Rehmann (born 21 May 1975) is a former professional tennis player from Germany.

== Career ==
Rehmann was a successful junior player, winning the Boys' Doubles at the 1993 Australian Open, with countryman Christian Tambue. They defeated the American pairing of Scott Humphries and Jimmy Jackson 6–7, 7–5, 6–2. In the same year he was also the junior single and doubles champion at Germany's national championship and also reached the final of the doubles at the 1993 Ansett Australian Indoor Championships. Along the way he and partner Alexander Mronz were victorious over top seeds Todd Woodbridge and Mark Woodforde.

In 1994, he partnered Australian Joshua Eagle at the Wimbledon Championships but they lost in the opening round to number six seeds Tom Nijssen and Cyril Suk. He also reached his first ATP final that year, at Zaragoza where he lost to Magnus Larsson.

The following year he competed in the singles of the 1995 Australian Open, the only other Grand Slam that he got to compete in. He defeated Luiz Mattar of Brazil 6–3, 6–4, 6–1 and make it into the second round, but then lost to eventual quarter finalist Andriy Medvedev 5–7, 4–6, 1–6. In Seoul he reached another ATP final but was defeated again, this time to Greg Rusedski.

He is married to former WTA player Melanie Schnell.

== Junior Grand Slam finals ==
=== Doubles: 1 (1 title) ===
Result	Year	Tournament	Surface	Partner	Opponents	Score
Win	1993	Australian Open	Hard	(Germany) Christian Tambue	(United States) Scott Humphries (United States) Jimmy Jackson	6–7, 7–5, 6–2

== ATP career finals ==
=== Singles: 2 (2 runners-up) ===
Legend Grand Slam tournaments (0–0) ATP World Tour Finals (0–0) ATP Masters Series (0–0) ATP Championship Series (0–0) ATP World Series (0–2)	Titles by surface Hard (0–1) Clay (0–0) Grass (0–0) Carpet (0–1)	Titles by setting Outdoor (0–1) Indoor (0–1)

Result	W–L	Date	Tournament	Tier	Surface	Opponent	Score
Loss	0–1	Mar 1994	Zaragoza, Spain	World Series	Carpet	(Sweden) Magnus Larsson	4–6, 4–6
Loss	0–2	May 1995	Seoul, South Korea	World Series	Hard	(Canada) Greg Rusedski	4–6, 1–3 ret.

=== Doubles: 1 (1 runner-up) ===
Legend Grand Slam tournaments (0–0) ATP World Tour Finals (0–0) ATP Masters Series (0–0) ATP Championship Series(0–1) ATP World Series (0–0)	Finals by surface Hard (0–1) Clay (0–0) Grass (0–0) Carpet (0–0)	Finals by setting Outdoor (0–0) Indoor (0–1)

Result	W–L	Date	Tournament	Tier	Surface	Partner	Opponents	Score
Loss	0–1	Oct 1993	Sydney, Australia	Championship Series	Hard	(Germany) Alexander Mronz	(United States) Patrick McEnroe (United States) Richey Reneberg	3–6, 5–7

== ATP Challenger and ITF Futures finals ==
=== Singles: 2 (1–1) ===
Legend ATP Challenger (1–1) ITF Futures (0–0)	Finals by surface Hard (0–0) Clay (1–1) Grass (0–0) Carpet (0–0)

Result	W–L	Date	Tournament	Tier	Surface	Opponent	Score
Win	1–0	Jul 1994	Eisenach, Germany	Challenger	Clay	(Austria) Thomas Gollwitzer	6–1, 1–6, 7–6
Loss	1–1	Sep 1996	Tashkent, Uzbekistan	Challenger	Clay	(Spain) Félix Mantilla	2–6, 2–6

=== Doubles: 6 (1–5) ===
Legend ATP Challenger (1–4) ITF Futures (0–1)	Finals by surface Hard (0–1) Clay (0–2) Grass (0–0) Carpet (1–2)

Result	W–L	Date	Tournament	Tier	Surface	Partner	Opponents	Score
Loss	0–1	Apr 1994	Nagoya, Japan	Challenger	Hard	(Israel) Gilad Bloom	(Canada) Daniel Nestor (Canada) Albert Chang	7–6, 4–6, 4–6
Loss	0–2	Nov 1995	Aachen, Germany	Challenger	Carpet	(Germany) Alexander Mronz	(Sweden) David Ekerot (Hungary) László Markovits	7–6, 4–6, 6–7
Loss	0–3	Feb 1996	Lübeck, Germany	Challenger	Carpet	(Switzerland) Lorenzo Manta	(United States) Jim Pugh (Netherlands) Joost Winnink	5–7, 5–7
Loss	0–4	Jul 1997	Montauban, France	Challenger	Clay	(Hungary) Attila Sávolt	(Italy) Gabrio Castrichella (Italy) Daniele Musa	6–7, 6–2, 5–7
Win	1–4	Oct 1997	Eckental, Germany	Challenger	Carpet	(Germany) Rainer Schüttler	(Austria) Georg Blumauer (Belarus) Max Mirnyi	6–4, 1–6, 6–3
Loss	1–5	Jul 1998	Austria F6, Bergheim	Futures	Clay	(Germany) Ullrich-Jasper Seetzen	(Germany) Patrick Sommer (Germany) Markus Wislsperger	4–6, 4–6

== Performance timeline ==
Key
W	F	SF	QF	#R	RR	Q#	DNQ	A	NH

(W) winner; (F) finalist; (SF) semifinalist; (QF) quarterfinalist; (#R) rounds 4, 3, 2, 1; (RR) round-robin stage; (Q#) qualification round; (DNQ) did not qualify; (A) absent; (NH) not held; (SR) strike rate (events won / competed); (W–L) win–loss record.

=== Singles ===
Tournament	1994	1995	1996	1997	SR	W–L	Win %
Grand Slam tournaments
Australian Open	Q3	2R	Q2	A	0 / 1	1–1	50%
French Open	Q1	A	Q1	Q2	0 / 0	0–0	–
Wimbledon	Q2	A	A	Q1	0 / 0	0–0	–
US Open	Q1	A	Q2	Q1	0 / 0	0–0	–
Win–loss	0–0	1–1	0–0	0–0	0 / 1	1–1	50%
ATP Masters Series
Hamburg	A	A	Q2	Q2	0 / 0	0–0	–
Canada	A	A	Q1	A	0 / 0	0–0	–
Paris	Q1	A	A	A	0 / 0	0–0	–
Win–loss	0–0	0–0	0–0	0–0	0 / 0	0–0	–
