= 1993 Wimbledon Championships =

- Date: 21 June – 4 July
- Edition: 107th
- Category: Grand Slam (ITF)
- Draw: 128S/64D/64XD
- Prize money: £5,048,450
- Surface: Grass
- Location: Church Road; SW19, Wimbledon, London, United Kingdom
- Venue: All England Lawn Tennis and Croquet Club

Champions

Men's singles
- (United States) Pete Sampras

Women's singles
- (Germany) Steffi Graf

Men's doubles
- (Australia) Todd Woodbridge / (Australia) Mark Woodforde

Women's doubles
- (United States) Gigi Fernández / (Belarus) Natasha Zvereva

Mixed doubles
- (Australia) Mark Woodforde / (United States) Martina Navratilova

Boys' singles
- (Romania) Răzvan Sabău

Girls' singles
- (Belgium) Nancy Feber

Boys' doubles
- (New Zealand) Steven Downs / (New Zealand) James Greenhalgh

Girls' doubles
- (Belgium) Laurence Courtois / (Belgium) Nancy Feber
← 1992 ·	Wimbledon Championships	· 1994 →

The 1993 Wimbledon Championships was a tennis tournament played on grass courts at the All England Lawn Tennis and Croquet Club in Wimbledon, London in the United Kingdom. It was the 107th edition of the Wimbledon Championships and was held from Monday 21 June to Sunday 4 July.

== Prize money ==
The total prize money for 1993 championships was £5,048,450. The winner of the men's title earned £305,000 while the women's singles champion earned £275,000.

Event	W	F	SF	QF	Round of 16	Round of 32	Round of 64	Round of 128
Men's singles	£305,000	£152,500	£67,250	£39,650	£21,350	£12,350	£7,470	£4,575
Women's singles	£275,000	£137,000	£66,720	£33,700	£17,080	£9,570	£5,790	£3,545
Men's doubles *	£124,960							—
Women's doubles *	£108,100							—
Mixed doubles *	£53,020							—

_{* per team}

== Champions ==
=== Seniors ===
==== Men's singles ====
(United States) Pete Sampras defeated (United States) Jim Courier, 7–6^{(7–3)}, 7–6^{(8–6)}, 3–6, 6–3

- It was Sampras' 2nd career Grand Slam singles title and his 1st Wimbledon title.

==== Women's singles ====
(Germany) Steffi Graf defeated (Czech Republic) Jana Novotná, 7–6^{(8–6)}, 1–6, 6–4

- It was Graf's 13th career Grand Slam singles title and her 5th Wimbledon title.

==== Men's doubles ====
(Australia) Todd Woodbridge / (Australia) Mark Woodforde defeated (Canada) Grant Connell / (United States) Patrick Galbraith, 7–5, 6–3, 7–6^{(7–4)}

- It was Woodbridge's 4th career Grand Slam title and his 1st Wimbledon title. It was Woodforde's 6th career Grand Slam title and his 1st Wimbledon title.

==== Women's doubles ====
(United States) Gigi Fernández / (Belarus) Natasha Zvereva defeated (Latvia) Larisa Neiland / (Czech Republic) Jana Novotná, 6–4, 6–7^{(4–7)}, 6–4

- It was Fernández's 9th career Grand Slam title and her 2nd Wimbledon title. It was Zvereva's 10th career Grand Slam title and her 3rd Wimbledon title.

==== Mixed doubles ====
(Australia) Mark Woodforde / (United States) Martina Navratilova defeated (Netherlands) Tom Nijssen / (Netherlands) Manon Bollegraf, 6–3, 6–4

- It was Woodforde's 7th career Grand Slam title and his 2nd Wimbledon title. It was Navratilova's 55th career Grand Slam title and her 18th Wimbledon title.

=== Juniors ===
==== Boys' singles ====
(Romania) Răzvan Sabău defeated (Venezuela) Jimy Szymanski, 6–1, 6–3

==== Girls' singles ====
(Belgium) Nancy Feber defeated (Italy) Rita Grande, 7–6^{(7–3)}, 1–6, 6–2

==== Boys' doubles ====
(New Zealand) Steven Downs / (New Zealand) James Greenhalgh defeated (South Africa) Neville Godwin / (South Africa) Gareth Williams, 6–7^{(6–8)}, 7–6^{(7–4)}, 7–5

==== Girls' doubles ====
(Belgium) Laurence Courtois / (Belgium) Nancy Feber defeated (Japan) Hiroko Mochizuki / (Japan) Yuka Yoshida, 6–3, 6–4

== Singles seeds ==
=== Men's singles ===
1. (United States) Pete Sampras (champion)
2. (Sweden) Stefan Edberg (semifinals, lost to Jim Courier)
3. (United States) Jim Courier (final, lost to Pete Sampras)
4. (Germany) Boris Becker (semifinals, lost to Pete Sampras)
5. (Croatia) Goran Ivanišević (third round, lost to Todd Martin)
6. (Germany) Michael Stich (quarterfinals, lost to Boris Becker)
7. (United States) Ivan Lendl (second round, lost to Arnaud Boetsch)
8. (United States) Andre Agassi (quarterfinals, lost to Pete Sampras)
9. (Netherlands) Richard Krajicek (fourth round, lost to Andre Agassi)
10. (Ukraine) Andriy Medvedev (second round, lost to Cédric Pioline)
11. (Czech Republic) Petr Korda (fourth round, lost to Michael Stich)
12. (United States) Michael Chang (third round, lost to David Wheaton)
13. (South Africa) Wayne Ferreira (fourth round, lost to Jim Courier)
14. (United States) MaliVai Washington (second round, lost to Aaron Krickstein)
15. (Czech Republic) Karel Nováček (first round, lost to Luis Herrera)
16. (Austria) Thomas Muster (first round, lost to Olivier Delaître)

=== Women's singles ===
1. (Germany) Steffi Graf (champion)
2. (United States) Martina Navratilova (semifinals, lost to Jana Novotná)
3. (Spain) Arantxa Sánchez Vicario (fourth round, lost to Helena Suková)
4. (Argentina) Gabriela Sabatini (quarterfinals, lost to Jana Novotná)
5. (United States) Mary Joe Fernández (third round, lost to Zina Garrison-Jackson)
6. (Spain) Conchita Martínez (semifinals, lost to Steffi Graf)
7. (United States) Jennifer Capriati (quarterfinals, lost to Steffi Graf)
8. (Czech Republic) Jana Novotná (final, lost to Steffi Graf)
9. (Germany) Anke Huber (fourth round, lost to Gabriela Sabatini)
10. (Bulgaria) Magdalena Maleeva (third round, lost to Yayuk Basuki)
11. (Switzerland) Manuela Maleeva-Fragnière (second round, lost to Naoko Sawamatsu)
12. (Bulgaria) Katerina Maleeva (first round, lost to Natasha Zvereva)
13. (France) Mary Pierce (withdrew before the tournament began)
14. (South Africa) Amanda Coetzer (second round, lost to Shaun Stafford)
15. (Czech Republic) Helena Suková (quarterfinals, lost to Conchita Martínez)
16. (France) Nathalie Tauziat (fourth round, lost to Martina Navratilova)

Preceded by 1993 French Open	Grand Slams	Succeeded by 1993 U.S. Open
