= 1993 Wimbledon Championships – Women's doubles =

Women's doubles
- 1993 Wimbledon Championships

Final
- Champions: (United States) Gigi Fernández; (Belarus) Natasha Zvereva
- Runners-up: (Latvia) Larisa Neiland; (Czechoslovakia) Jana Novotná
- Score: 6–4, 6–7^{(4–7)}, 6–4

Details
- Draw: 64 (4 Q / 2 WC )
- Seeds: 16

Events
Singles	men	women		boys	girls
Doubles	men	women	mixed	boys	girls
WC Singles	men	women	quad
WC Doubles	men	women	quad
Legends	men	women	seniors
← 1992 ·	Wimbledon Championships	· 1994 →

Gigi Fernández and Natasha Zvereva successfully defended their title, defeating Larisa Neiland and Jana Novotná in the final, 6–4, 6–7^{(4–7)}, 6–4 to win the ladies' doubles tennis title at the 1993 Wimbledon Championships.

This was their 6th consecutive women’s doubles grand slam title.

== Seeds ==
1. (United States) Gigi Fernández / (Belarus) Natasha Zvereva (champions)
2. (Latvia) Larisa Neiland / (Czechoslovakia) Jana Novotná (final)
3. (Spain) Arantxa Sánchez Vicario / (Czech Republic) Helena Suková (quarterfinals)
4. (United States) Lori McNeil / (Australia) Rennae Stubbs (quarterfinals)
5. (United States) Mary Joe Fernández / (United States) Zina Garrison-Jackson (semifinals)
6. (United States) Pam Shriver / (Australia) Elizabeth Smylie (semifinals)
7. (United States) Jennifer Capriati / (Germany) Steffi Graf (withdrew)
8. (Canada) Jill Hetherington / (United States) Kathy Rinaldi (quarterfinals)
9. (United States) Katrina Adams / (Netherlands) Manon Bollegraf (first round)
10. (South Africa) Amanda Coetzer / (Argentina) Inés Gorrochategui (first round)
11. (Bulgaria) Magdalena Maleeva / (Switzerland) Manuela Maleeva-Fragnière (third round)
12. (United States) Patty Fendick / (United States) Meredith McGrath (second round)
13. (Italy) Sandra Cecchini / (Argentina) Patricia Tarabini (withdrew)
14. (Russia) Eugenia Maniokova / (Georgia (country)) Leila Meskhi (second round)
15. (United States) Debbie Graham / (Netherlands) Brenda Schultz (first round)
16. (France) Isabelle Demongeot / (South Africa) Elna Reinach (first round)
17. (United States) Sandy Collins / (United States) Robin White (second round)
18. (Argentina) Florencia Labat / (Slovakia) Radka Zrubáková (first round)

Click on the seed number of a player to go to their draw section.

== Draw ==
=== Key ===
- Q = Qualifier
- WC = Wild card
- LL = Lucky loser
- Alt = Alternate
- ITF = ITF entry
- PR = Protected ranking
- SR = Special ranking
- SE = Special exempt
- JE = Junior exempt
- JR = Junior Accelerator Programme entrant
- CO = College Accelerator Programme entrant
- NG = Next Gen Accelerator Program entrant
- w/o = Walkover
- r = Retired
- d = Defaulted

=== Finals ===
Quarterfinals

Semifinals

Final

1
- (United States) Gigi Fernández
- (Belarus) Natasha Zvereva
6
6

8
- (Canada) Jill Hetherington
- (United States) Kathy Rinaldi
1
2

1
- (United States) Gigi Fernández
- (Belarus) Natasha Zvereva
3
6
10

5
- (United States) Mary Joe Fernández
- (United States) Zina Garrison-Jackson
6
1
8

4
- (United States) Lori McNeil
- (Australia) Rennae Stubbs
5
6^{4}

5
- (United States) Mary Joe Fernández
- (United States) Zina Garrison-Jackson
7
7^{7}

1
- (United States) Gigi Fernández
- (Belarus) Natasha Zvereva
6
6^{4}
6

2
- (Latvia) Larisa Neiland
- (Czech Republic) Jana Novotná
4
7^{7}
4

6
- (United States) Pam Shriver
- (Australia) Elizabeth Smylie
6
6

3
- (Spain) Arantxa Sánchez Vicario
- (Czech Republic) Helena Suková
3
4

6
- (United States) Pam Shriver
- (Australia) Elizabeth Smylie
2
2

2
- (Latvia) Larisa Neiland
- (Czech Republic) Jana Novotná
6
6

- (Australia) Jo-Anne Faull
- (New Zealand) Julie Richardson
6^{3}
6
3

2
- (Latvia) Larisa Neiland
- (Czech Republic) Jana Novotná
7^{7}
4
6

=== Top half ===
==== Section 1 ====
First round

Second round

Third round

Quarterfinals

1
- (United States) G Fernández
- (Belarus) N Zvereva
6
6

- (United States) L Allen
- (United States) A Henricksson
0
1

1
- (United States) G Fernández
- (Belarus) N Zvereva
6
1
6

- (United States) C MacGregor
- (United States) S Stafford
6
6^{3}
6

- (United States) C MacGregor
- (United States) S Stafford
4
6
3

- (Australia) J Hodder
- (Australia) A Woolcock
4
7^{7}
2

1
- (United States) G Fernández
- (Belarus) N Zvereva
6
6

- (United Kingdom) J Durie
- (France) C Suire
6
3
11

11
- (Bulgaria) M Maleeva
- (Switzerland) M Maleeva-Fragnière
3
1

- (United States) E Nagelsen
- (South Africa) R Nideffer
4
6
9

- (United Kingdom) J Durie
- (France) C Suire
1
3

- (Czech Republic) R Bobková
- (Czech Republic) P Langrová
4
3

11
- (Bulgaria) M Maleeva
- (Switzerland) M Maleeva-Fragnière
6
6

11
- (Bulgaria) M Maleeva
- (Switzerland) M Maleeva-Fragnière
6
6

1
- (United States) G Fernández
- (Belarus) N Zvereva
6
6

14
- (Russia) E Maniokova
- (Georgia (country)) L Meskhi
6
6

8
- (Canada) J Hetherington
- (United States) K Rinaldi
1
2

LL
- (United Kingdom) E Bond
- (United Kingdom) C Taylor
3
1

14
- (Russia) E Maniokova
- (Georgia (country)) L Meskhi
3
2

- (Belgium) S Appelmans
- (Germany) B Rittner
1
6
2

- (Australia) R McQuillan
- (Germany) C Porwik
6
6

- (Australia) R McQuillan
- (Germany) C Porwik
6
3
6

- (Australia) R McQuillan
- (Germany) C Porwik
1
3

Q
- (Australia) J Byrne
- (Australia) N Pratt
6
5
2

8
- (Canada) J Hetherington
- (United States) K Rinaldi
6
6

- (United States) S McCarthy
- (United States) K Po
2
7
6

- (United States) S McCarthy
- (United States) K Po
2
2

- (United States) A Grossman
- (Canada) P Hy
6
2
6

8
- (Canada) J Hetherington
- (United States) K Rinaldi
6
6

8
- (Canada) J Hetherington
- (United States) K Rinaldi
3
6
8

==== Section 2 ====
First round

Second round

Third round

Quarterfinals

4
- (United States) L McNeil
- (Australia) R Stubbs
6
6

- (Finland) N Dahlman
- (Australia) L Field
4
2

4
- (United States) L McNeil
- (Australia) R Stubbs
6
6

- (Japan) R Hiraki
- (Japan) N Miyagi
3
7^{7}
4

Q
- (South Africa) T Price
- (South Africa) D Van Rensburg
2
4

Q
- (South Africa) T Price
- (South Africa) D Van Rensburg
6
6^{4}
6

4
- (United States) L McNeil
- (Australia) R Stubbs
7
7^{9}

- (United States) L Harvey-Wild
- (Austria) J Wiesner
7^{7}
6

- (United Kingdom) V Lake
- (United Kingdom) C Wood
5
6^{7}

- (Australia) C Barclay
- (Australia) K-A Guse
6^{5}
1

- (United States) L Harvey-Wild
- (Austria) J Wiesner
2
3

- (United Kingdom) V Lake
- (United Kingdom) C Wood
6
2
6

- (United Kingdom) V Lake
- (United Kingdom) C Wood
6
6

10
- (South Africa) A Coetzer
- (Argentina) I Gorrochategui
2
6
4

4
- (United States) L McNeil
- (Australia) R Stubbs
5
6^{4}

15
- (United States) D Graham
- (Netherlands) B Schultz
3
7
2

5
- (United States) MJ Fernández
- (United States) Z Garrison-Jackson
7
7^{7}

- (Indonesia) Y Basuki
- (Argentina) M Paz
6
5
6

- (Indonesia) Y Basuki
- (Argentina) M Paz
6
6

- (United States) H Ludloff
- (United States) T Whittington
7^{7}
4
6

- (United States) H Ludloff
- (United States) T Whittington
2
2

WC
- (United Kingdom) J Pullin
- (United Kingdom) L Woodroffe
6^{5}
6
1

- (Indonesia) Y Basuki
- (Argentina) M Paz
4
1

- (United States) L Davenport
- (United States) C Rubin
6
6

5
- (United States) MJ Fernández
- (United States) Z Garrison-Jackson
6
6

LL
- (Austria) H Sprung
- (Australia) D Thomas
4
3

- (United States) L Davenport
- (United States) C Rubin
7^{7}
3
5

- (Australia) D Jones
- (Czech Republic) E Švíglerová
2
1

5
- (United States) MJ Fernández
- (United States) Z Garrison-Jackson
6^{5}
6
7

5
- (United States) MJ Fernández
- (United States) Z Garrison-Jackson
6
6

=== Bottom half ===
==== Section 3 ====
First round

Second round

Third round

Quarterfinals

6
- (United States) P Shriver
- (Australia) E Smylie
6
6

LL
- (Russia) N Egorova
- (Russia) S Parkhomenko
3
3

6
- (United States) P Shriver
- (Australia) E Smylie
6
6

WC
- (United Kingdom) A Grunfeld
- (United Kingdom) J Salmon
4
7
4

- (Germany) K Kschwendt
- (Germany) W Probst
0
3

- (Germany) K Kschwendt
- (Germany) W Probst
6
5
6

6
- (United States) P Shriver
- (Australia) E Smylie
6
2
6

- (France) P Paradis-Mangon
- (France) S Testud
1
6
3

- (Slovakia) K Habšudová
- (Netherlands) N Muns-Jagerman
0
6
3

- (France) J Halard
- (Germany) A Huber
6
3
6

- (France) J Halard
- (Germany) A Huber
1
6^{2}

- (Slovakia) K Habšudová
- (Netherlands) N Muns-Jagerman
6
6

- (Slovakia) K Habšudová
- (Netherlands) N Muns-Jagerman
6
7^{7}

18
- (Argentina) F Labat
- (Slovakia) R Zrubáková
4
2

6
- (United States) P Shriver
- (Australia) E Smylie
6
6

17
- (United States) S Collins
- (United States) R White
4
6
6

3
- (Spain) A Sánchez Vicario
- (Czech Republic) H Suková
3
2

LL
- (United States) C Benjamin
- (Australia) T Morton
6
4
2

17
- (United States) S Collins
- (United States) R White
6^{4}
6
3

- (Australia) M Jaggard-Lai
- (Australia) K Radford
7^{7}
6

- (Australia) M Jaggard-Lai
- (Australia) K Radford
7^{7}
4
6

- (United States) G Helgeson
- (United States) M Werdel
6^{3}
2

- (Australia) M Jaggard-Lai
- (Australia) K Radford
4
3

Q
- (Australia) K McDonald
- (Australia) K Sharpe
6^{7}
6
3

3
- (Spain) A Sánchez Vicario
- (Czech Republic) H Suková
6
6

- (Ukraine) E Brioukhovets
- (Ukraine) N Medvedeva
7^{9}
4
6

- (Ukraine) E Brioukhovets
- (Ukraine) N Medvedeva
1
2

- (Italy) S Farina
- (Italy) L Ferrando
2
2

3
- (Spain) A Sánchez Vicario
- (Czech Republic) H Suková
6
6

3
- (Spain) A Sánchez Vicario
- (Czech Republic) H Suková
6
6

==== Section 4 ====
First round

Second round

Third round

Quarterfinals

9
- (United States) K Adams
- (Netherlands) M Bollegraf
3
6
4

- (Netherlands) M Oremans
- (Netherlands) C Vis
6
4
6

- (Netherlands) M Oremans
- (Netherlands) C Vis
6
6

- (France) N van Lottum
- (Australia) L Pleming
4
6^{2}

- (Sweden) M Lindström
- (Sweden) M Strandlund
3
4

- (Sweden) M Lindström
- (Sweden) M Strandlund
6
7^{7}

- (Netherlands) M Oremans
- (Netherlands) C Vis
4
7^{10}
3

- (Australia) J-A Faull
- (New Zealand) J Richardson
2
6
6

- (Australia) J-A Faull
- (New Zealand) J Richardson
6
6^{8}
6

- (United States) N Arendt
- (United States) J Emmons
6
4
3

- (Australia) J-A Faull
- (New Zealand) J Richardson
3
7
6

- (United States) E Burgin
- (United States) P O'Reilly
3
1

12
- (United States) P Fendick
- (United States) M McGrath
6
5
3

12
- (United States) P Fendick
- (United States) M McGrath
6
6

- (Australia) J-A Faull
- (New Zealand) J Richardson
6^{3}
6
3

16
- (France) I Demongeot
- (South Africa) E Reinach
4
4

2
- (Latvia) L Neiland
- (Czech Republic) J Novotná
7^{7}
4
6

- (Netherlands) I Driehuis
- (Mexico) L Novelo
6
6

- (Netherlands) I Driehuis
- (Mexico) L Novelo
7
3
1

- (China) F Li
- (Japan) K Nagatsuka
6
2
0

- (Peru) L Gildemeister
- (Hungary) A Temesvári
5
6
6

- (Peru) L Gildemeister
- (Hungary) A Temesvári
4
6
6

- (Peru) L Gildemeister
- (Hungary) A Temesvári
2
2

- (Japan) E Iida
- (Japan) M Kidowaki
6
0
4

2
- (Latvia) L Neiland
- (Czech Republic) J Novotná
6
6

- (Bulgaria) K Maleeva
- (France) N Tauziat
4
6
6

- (Bulgaria) K Maleeva
- (France) N Tauziat
4
2

Q
- (Australia) K Godridge
- (Australia) J Limmer
3
1

2
- (Latvia) L Neiland
- (Czech Republic) J Novotná
6
6

2
- (Latvia) L Neiland
- (Czech Republic) J Novotná
6
6
