= 1993 Wimbledon Championships – Mixed doubles =

Mixed doubles
- 1993 Wimbledon Championships

Final
- Champions: (Australia) Mark Woodforde (United States) Martina Navratilova
- Runners-up: (Netherlands) Tom Nijssen (Netherlands) Manon Bollegraf
- Score: 6–3, 6–4

Details
- Draw: 64 (5 WC )
- Seeds: 16

Events
Singles	men	women		boys	girls
Doubles	men	women	mixed	boys	girls
WC Singles	men	women	quad
WC Doubles	men	women	quad
Legends	men	women	seniors
← 1992 ·	Wimbledon Championships	· 1994 →

Cyril Suk and Larisa Neiland were the defending champions but lost in the third round to Grant Connell and Robin White.

Mark Woodforde and Martina Navratilova defeated Tom Nijssen and Manon Bollegraf in the final, 6–3, 6–4 to win the mixed doubles tennis title at the 1993 Wimbledon Championships.

== Seeds ==
1. (Australia) Todd Woodbridge / (Spain) Arantxa Sánchez Vicario (semifinals)
2. (Australia) Mark Kratzmann / (Belarus) Natasha Zvereva (semifinals)
3. (Australia) Mark Woodforde / (United States) Martina Navratilova (champions)
4. (South Africa) Danie Visser / (United States) Gigi Fernández (withdrew)
5. (United States) Rick Leach / (United States) Zina Garrison-Jackson (third round)
6. (Czech Republic) Cyril Suk / (Latvia) Larisa Neiland (third round)
7. (United States) Patrick Galbraith / (United States) Kathy Rinaldi (quarterfinals)
8. (Australia) John Fitzgerald / (Australia) Elizabeth Smylie (third round)
9. (United States) Steve DeVries / (United States) Patty Fendick (first round)
10. (Canada) Glenn Michibata / (Canada) Jill Hetherington (third round)
11. (Canada) Grant Connell / (United States) Robin White (quarterfinals)
12. (Netherlands) Tom Nijssen / (Netherlands) Manon Bollegraf (final)
13. (United States) Greg Van Emburgh / (Czech Republic) Helena Suková (first round)
14. (United States) Luke Jensen / (United States) Meredith McGrath (third round)
15. (United States) Murphy Jensen / (Netherlands) Brenda Schultz (first round)
16. (South Africa) Stefan Kruger / (South Africa) Amanda Coetzer (third round)

Click on the seed number of a player to go to their draw section.

== Draw ==
=== Key ===
- Q = Qualifier
- WC = Wild card
- LL = Lucky loser
- Alt = Alternate
- SE = Special exempt
- PR = Protected ranking
- ITF = ITF entry
- JE = Junior exempt
- w/o = Walkover
- r = Retired
- d = Defaulted
- SR = Special ranking

=== Finals ===
Quarterfinals
1	(Australia) Todd Woodbridge (Spain) Arantxa Sánchez Vicario	6	3	6
(United Kingdom) Jeremy Bates (United Kingdom) Jo Durie	2	6	3
(Sweden) Jan Apell (Sweden) Maria Strandlund	2	3
12	(Netherlands) Tom Nijssen (Netherlands) Manon Bollegraf	6	6
7	(United States) Patrick Galbraith (United States) Kathy Rinaldi	6^{3}	6^{5}
3	(Australia) Mark Woodforde (United States) Martina Navratilova	7^{7}	7^{7}
11	(Canada) Grant Connell (United States) Robin White	6	6^{5}	11
2	(Australia) Mark Kratzmann (Belarus) Natasha Zvereva	3	7^{7}	13

Semifinals
1	(Australia) Todd Woodbridge (Spain) Arantxa Sánchez Vicario	7	5	4
12	(Netherlands) Tom Nijssen (Netherlands) Manon Bollegraf	5	7	6
3	(Australia) Mark Woodforde (United States) Martina Navratilova	4	6	6
2	(Australia) Mark Kratzmann (Belarus) Natasha Zvereva	6	3	4

Final
12	(Netherlands) Tom Nijssen (Netherlands) Manon Bollegraf	3	4
3	(Australia) Mark Woodforde (United States) Martina Navratilova	6	6

=== Top half ===
==== Section 1 ====
First round
1	(Australia) T Woodbridge (Spain) A Sánchez Vicario	6	6
(Argentina) J Frana (Argentina) F Labat	3	3
(United States) M Keil (Australia) N Provis	6^{1}	1
(United States) S Davis (United States) L Davenport	7^{7}	6
(United States) K Kinnear (Japan) N Miyagi	2	6	7
(Australia) L Warder (France) C Suire	6	2	9
(United States) R Reneberg (United States) E Nagelsen	7^{7}	3	7
15	(United States) M Jensen (Netherlands) B Schultz	6^{5}	6	5
13	(United States) G Van Emburgh (Czech Republic) H Suková	5	4
(United Kingdom) J Bates (United Kingdom) J Durie	7	6
(United States) S Cannon (United States) S Stafford	4	4
(Argentina) P Albano (Argentina) P Tarabini	6	6
(South Africa) J-L de Jager (Netherlands) C Vis
(United States) J Pugh (Italy) L Ferrando	w/o
(United States) D Pate (United States) A Grossman	6	2	2
8	(Australia) J Fitzgerald (Australia) E Smylie	3	6	6

Second round
1	(Australia) T Woodbridge (Spain) A Sánchez Vicario	6	6
(United States) S Davis (United States) L Davenport	2	3
(Australia) L Warder (France) C Suire	1	4
(United States) R Reneberg (United States) E Nagelsen	6	6
(United Kingdom) J Bates (United Kingdom) J Durie	6	6
(Argentina) P Albano (Argentina) P Tarabini	3	2
(South Africa) J-L de Jager (Netherlands) C Vis	3	4
8	(Australia) J Fitzgerald (Australia) E Smylie	6	6

Third round
1	(Australia) T Woodbridge (Spain) A Sánchez Vicario	6	6
(United States) R Reneberg (United States) E Nagelsen	2	3
(United Kingdom) J Bates (United Kingdom) J Durie	6	6^{1}	6
8	(Australia) J Fitzgerald (Australia) E Smylie	2	7^{7}	3

Quarterfinals
1	(Australia) T Woodbridge (Spain) A Sánchez Vicario	6	3	6
(United Kingdom) J Bates (United Kingdom) J Durie	2	6	3

==== Section 2 ====
First round
Alt	(Sweden) J Donar (Sweden) M Lindström	3	4
(Netherlands) J Eltingh (Netherlands) M Oremans	6	6
(Sweden) J Apell (Sweden) M Strandlund	6	6
(South Africa) P Norval (Australia) C Barclay	4	3
(Australia) J Stoltenberg (Czech Republic) A Strnadová	3	7	0
(Australia) S Stolle (Australia) R Stubbs	6	5	6
(Sweden) R Bergh (United States) K Po	6	6
9	(United States) S DeVries (United States) P Fendick	4	2
12	(Netherlands) T Nijssen (Netherlands) M Bollegraf	6	6
Alt	(United States) TJ Middleton (United States) A Henricksson	3	4
(United States) B Shelton (United States) L McNeil	6^{6}	6	7
(United States) M Bauer (Germany) K Kschwendt	7^{8}	3	5
WC	(United Kingdom) M Petchey (United Kingdom) C Wood	6	6
(United States) K Jones (Ukraine) N Medvedeva	2	2
(Netherlands) HJ Davids (Australia) J-A Faull	6	2	3
5	(United States) R Leach (United States) Z Garrison-Jackson	3	6	6

Second round
(Netherlands) J Eltingh (Netherlands) M Oremans	5	4
(Sweden) J Apell (Sweden) M Strandlund	7	6
(Australia) S Stolle (Australia) R Stubbs	6	6
(Sweden) R Bergh (United States) K Po	3	4
12	(Netherlands) T Nijssen (Netherlands) M Bollegraf	3	6	6
(United States) B Shelton (United States) L McNeil	6	3	2
WC	(United Kingdom) M Petchey (United Kingdom) C Wood	3	4
5	(United States) R Leach (United States) Z Garrison-Jackson	6	6

Third round
(Sweden) J Apell (Sweden) M Strandlund	3	6	6
(Australia) S Stolle (Australia) R Stubbs	6	3	4
12	(Netherlands) T Nijssen (Netherlands) M Bollegraf	6^{3}	6	6
5	(United States) R Leach (United States) Z Garrison-Jackson	7^{7}	2	2

Quarterfinals
(Sweden) J Apell (Sweden) M Strandlund	2	3
12	(Netherlands) T Nijssen (Netherlands) M Bollegraf	6	6

=== Bottom half ===
==== Section 3 ====
First round
7	(United States) P Galbraith (United States) K Rinaldi	6	6
(South Africa) M Ondruska (Australia) K-A Guse	2	3
(United States) D Randall (United States) S McCarthy	6^{4}	2
(United States) B Garnett (Australia) K Radford	7^{7}	6
WC	(United Kingdom) C Bailey (United Kingdom) M Javer	7^{7}	3	9
(Zimbabwe) B Black (Mexico) L Novelo	6^{5}	6	7
(United Kingdom) N Broad (New Zealand) J Richardson	6^{6}	5
16	(South Africa) S Kruger (South Africa) A Coetzer	7^{8}	7
14	(United States) L Jensen (United States) M McGrath	7^{7}	6
(Czech Republic) V Flégl (Slovakia) R Zrubáková	6^{4}	3
(United States) S Melville (United States) L Harvey-Wild	4	5
(United States) F Montana (Japan) E Iida	6	7
(Australia) D Macpherson (Australia) R McQuillan	6	6
(United States) K Flach (South Africa) R Nideffer	2	4
(United States) T Kronemann (United States) C MacGregor	2	6^{7}
3	(Australia) M Woodforde (United States) M Navratilova	6	7^{9}

Second round
7	(United States) P Galbraith (United States) K Rinaldi	6	6
(United States) B Garnett (Australia) K Radford	2	4
WC	(United Kingdom) C Bailey (United Kingdom) M Javer	4	6	1
16	(South Africa) S Kruger (South Africa) A Coetzer	6	3	6
14	(United States) L Jensen (United States) M McGrath	6	6
(United States) F Montana (Japan) E Iida	3	3
(Australia) D Macpherson (Australia) R McQuillan	4	5
3	(Australia) M Woodforde (United States) M Navratilova	6	7

Third round
7	(United States) P Galbraith (United States) K Rinaldi	7	6
16	(South Africa) S Kruger (South Africa) A Coetzer	5	1
14	(United States) L Jensen (United States) M McGrath	4	2
3	(Australia) M Woodforde (United States) M Navratilova	6	6

Quarterfinals
7	(United States) P Galbraith (United States) K Rinaldi	6^{3}	6^{5}
3	(Australia) M Woodforde (United States) M Navratilova	7^{7}	7^{7}

==== Section 4 ====
First round
6	(Czech Republic) C Suk (Latvia) L Neiland	6	4	6
(United States) M Briggs (Georgia (country)) L Meskhi	4	6	2
WC	(United Kingdom) M Maclagan (United Kingdom) A Wainwright	2	1
(South Africa) D Adams (Russia) E Maniokova	6	6
WC	(United Kingdom) C Wilkinson (United Kingdom) J Salmon	6	6
(South Africa) B Talbot (Hungary) A Temesvári	4	3
WC	(United Kingdom) A Foster (United Kingdom) A Grunfeld	2	5
11	(Canada) G Connell (United States) R White	6	7
10	(Canada) G Michibata (Canada) J Hetherington	1	7^{7}	6
(United States) T Witsken (United States) K Adams	6	6^{4}	4
(Belgium) L Pimek (United States) S Collins	7	3	6
(Venezuela) N Pereira (Argentina) M Paz	5	6	2
(South Africa) C van Rensburg (South Africa) E Reinach	6	6
(South Africa) R Deppe (France) I Demongeot	4	4
(Netherlands) M Oosting (Germany) C Porwik	3	3
2	(Australia) M Kratzmann (Belarus) N Zvereva	6	6

Second round
6	(Czech Republic) C Suk (Latvia) L Neiland	6	6
(South Africa) D Adams (Russia) E Maniokova	3	4
WC	(United Kingdom) C Wilkinson (United Kingdom) J Salmon	4	5
11	(Canada) G Connell (United States) R White	6	7
10	(Canada) G Michibata (Canada) J Hetherington	7^{8}	3	6
(Belgium) L Pimek (United States) S Collins	6^{6}	6	1
(South Africa) C van Rensburg (South Africa) E Reinach	6	5	3
2	(Australia) M Kratzmann (Belarus) N Zvereva	4	7	6

Third round
6	(Czech Republic) C Suk (Latvia) L Neiland	6^{4}	6	2
11	(Canada) G Connell (United States) R White	7^{7}	2	6
10	(Canada) G Michibata (Canada) J Hetherington	3	5
2	(Australia) M Kratzmann (Belarus) N Zvereva	6	7

Quarterfinals
11	(Canada) G Connell (United States) R White	6	6^{5}	11
2	(Australia) M Kratzmann (Belarus) N Zvereva	3	7^{7}	13
