= 1993 Wimbledon Championships – Women's singles =

Women's singles
- 1993 Wimbledon Championships

Final
- Champion: (Germany) Steffi Graf
- Runner-up: (Czech Republic) Jana Novotná
- Score: 7–6^{(8–6)}, 1–6, 6–4

Details
- Draw: 128 (8 Q / 8 WC )
- Seeds: 16

Events
Singles	men	women		boys	girls
Doubles	men	women	mixed	boys	girls
WC Singles	men	women	quad
WC Doubles	men	women	quad
Legends	men	women	seniors
← 1992 ·	Wimbledon Championships	· 1994 →

Two-time defending champion Steffi Graf defeated Jana Novotná in the final, 7–6^{(8–6)}, 1–6, 6–4 to win the ladies' singles tennis title at the 1993 Wimbledon Championships. It was her fifth Wimbledon singles title and 13th major singles title overall. Down 1–4 in the final set, Graf won the next five games to win the title. Novotná's devastation at the loss during the trophy ceremony became an iconic image of the Wimbledon Championships. She would win the title five years later.

== Seeds ==
1. (Germany) Steffi Graf (champion)
2. (United States) Martina Navratilova (semifinals)
3. (Spain) Arantxa Sánchez Vicario (fourth round)
4. (Argentina) Gabriela Sabatini (quarterfinals)
5. (United States) Mary Joe Fernández (third round)
6. (Spain) Conchita Martínez (semifinals)
7. (United States) Jennifer Capriati (quarterfinals)
8. (Czech Republic) Jana Novotná (final)
9. (Germany) Anke Huber (fourth round)
10. (Bulgaria) Magdalena Maleeva (third round)
11. (Switzerland) Manuela Maleeva-Fragnière (second round)
12. (Bulgaria) Katerina Maleeva (first round)
13. (France) Mary Pierce (withdrew)
14. (South Africa) Amanda Coetzer (second round)
15. (Czech Republic) Helena Suková (quarterfinals)
16. (France) Nathalie Tauziat (fourth round)

Click on the seed number of a player to go to their draw section.

Mary Pierce withdrew due to illness. She was replaced in the draw by lucky loser Louise Field.

== Draw ==
=== Key ===
- Q = Qualifier
- WC = Wild card
- LL = Lucky loser
- Alt = Alternate
- ITF = ITF entry
- PR = Protected ranking
- SR = Special ranking
- SE = Special exempt
- JE = Junior exempt
- JR = Junior Accelerator Programme entrant
- CO = College Accelerator Programme entrant
- NG = Next Gen Accelerator Program entrant
- w/o = Walkover
- r = Retired
- d = Defaulted

=== Finals ===
Quarterfinals
1	(Germany) Steffi Graf	7^{7}	6
7	(United States) Jennifer Capriati	6^{3}	1
15	(Czech Republic) Helena Suková	1	4
6	(Spain) Conchita Martínez	6	6
8	(Czech Republic) Jana Novotná	6	6
4	(Argentina) Gabriela Sabatini	4	3
(Belarus) Natasha Zvereva	3	1
2	(United States) Martina Navratilova	6	6

Semifinals
1	(Germany) Steffi Graf	7^{7}	6
6	(Spain) Conchita Martínez	6^{0}	3
8	(Czech Republic) Jana Novotná	6	6
2	(United States) Martina Navratilova	4	4

Final
1	(Germany) Steffi Graf	7^{8}	1	6
8	(Czech Republic) Jana Novotná	6^{6}	6	4

=== Top half ===
==== Section 1 ====
First round
1	(Germany) S Graf	6	6
Q	(Australia) K Sharpe	0	0
WC	(United Kingdom) C Wood	6	6
LL	(Germany) M Kochta	1	1
(Australia) R McQuillan	6	6
LL	(Australia) J Byrne	4	2
(Czech Republic) P Langrová	1	3
(Canada) H Kelesi	6	6
(United States) T Whitlinger	0	6	4
(United States) A Grossman	6	4	6
Q	(United States) M McGrath	7	6
(Belgium) N Feber	5	3
(United States) S Stafford	6^{4}	6	6
(Germany) S Meier	7^{7}	4	1
(France) S Testud	3	6	3
14	(South Africa) A Coetzer	6	3	6

Second round
1	(Germany) S Graf	6	6
WC	(United Kingdom) C Wood	2	1
(Australia) R McQuillan	6^{5}	4
(Canada) H Kelesi	7^{7}	6
(United States) A Grossman	4	6	3
Q	(United States) M McGrath	6	1	6
(United States) S Stafford	6	6
14	(South Africa) A Coetzer	3	2

Third round
1	(Germany) S Graf	6	6
(Canada) H Kelesi	0	0
Q	(United States) M McGrath	6	6
(United States) S Stafford	1	2

Fourth round
1	(Germany) S Graf	6	6
Q	(United States) M McGrath	1	4

==== Section 2 ====
First round
11	(Switzerland) Man Maleeva-Fragnière	7	6
WC	(United Kingdom) L Woodroffe	5	4
(France) J Halard	6	4	3
(Japan) N Sawamatsu	4	6	6
(United States) N Arendt	2	6	14
(France) I Demongeot	6	3	12
(United States) L Raymond	6	6
(United States) L Allen	1	2
(Netherlands) B Schultz	6	6
(Argentina) P Tarabini	4	1
(Germany) W Probst	2	3
(United States) C Rubin	6	6
(United Kingdom) J Durie	6	4	2
(Australia) E Smylie	4	6	6
WC	(United Kingdom) S-A Siddall	7^{7}	2	1
7	(United States) J Capriati	6^{5}	6	6

Second round
11	(Switzerland) Man Maleeva-Fragnière	3	3
(Japan) N Sawamatsu	6	6
(United States) N Arendt	2	3
(United States) L Raymond	6	6
(Netherlands) B Schultz	4	6	6
(United States) C Rubin	6	2	2
(Australia) E Smylie	6	3	2
7	(United States) J Capriati	4	6	6

Third round
(Japan) N Sawamatsu	5	2
(United States) L Raymond	7	6
(Netherlands) B Schultz	5	6	2
7	(United States) J Capriati	7	4	6

Fourth round
(United States) L Raymond	6	3	6
7	(United States) J Capriati	4	6	8

==== Section 3 ====
First round
3	(Spain) A Sánchez Vicario	6	6
(Slovakia) R Zrubáková	1	1
WC	(United Kingdom) C Hall	3	2
(Latvia) L Neiland	6	6
(Belgium) S Wasserman	6	6
(China) F Li	2	4
(South Africa) E Reinach	1	1
(United States) P Fendick	6	6
Q	(South Africa) T Price	4	1
(Australia) N Provis	6	6
(Ukraine) E Brioukhovets	6	3	6
(Belgium) D Monami	3	6	3
(Italy) S Farina	6	6
(Czech Republic) R Bobková	0	2
(Italy) N Baudone	0	6^{0}
15	(Czech Republic) H Suková	6	7^{7}

Second round
3	(Spain) A Sánchez Vicario	7^{7}	6
(Latvia) L Neiland	6^{5}	0
(Belgium) S Wasserman	1	3
(United States) P Fendick	6	6
(Australia) N Provis	5	4
(Ukraine) E Brioukhovets	7	6
(Italy) S Farina	4	2
15	(Czech Republic) H Suková	6	6

Third round
3	(Spain) A Sánchez Vicario	6	6
(United States) P Fendick	3	2
(Ukraine) E Brioukhovets	7^{7}	3	3
15	(Czech Republic) H Suková	6^{4}	6	6

Fourth round
3	(Spain) A Sánchez Vicario	3	4
15	(Czech Republic) H Suková	6	6

==== Section 4 ====
First round
10	(Bulgaria) Mag Maleeva	6	6
(Georgia (country)) L Meskhi	2	2
(United States) L McNeil	6	6
WC	(United Kingdom) A Grunfeld	1	0
(United States) R White	2	6	6
(Belarus) T Ignatieva	6	3	2
(Indonesia) Y Basuki	6	7
(France) N van Lottum	4	5
Q	(United States) C MacGregor	4	6	5
(Czech Republic) K Kroupová	6	1	7
(France) P Paradis-Mangon	6	6
(Netherlands) M Bollegraf	4	3
(Netherlands) S Rottier	6	6
(Austria) J Wiesner	1	4
(United States) G Helgeson	5	3
6	(Spain) C Martínez	7	6

Second round
10	(Bulgaria) Mag Maleeva	7^{9}	6
(United States) L McNeil	6^{7}	4
(United States) R White	5	3
(Indonesia) Y Basuki	7	6
(Czech Republic) K Kroupová	0	0
(France) P Paradis-Mangon	6	6
(Austria) J Wiesner	1	6	1
6	(Spain) C Martínez	6	4	6

Third round
10	(Bulgaria) Mag Maleeva	4	2
(Indonesia) Y Basuki	6	6
(France) P Paradis-Mangon	5	0
6	(Spain) C Martínez	7	6

Fourth round
(Indonesia) Y Basuki	6	2	2
6	(Spain) C Martínez	3	6	6

=== Bottom half ===
==== Section 5 ====
First round
8	(Czech Republic) J Novotná	6	6
(Switzerland) E Zardo	1	3
(South Africa) J Kruger	6^{2}	1
(Argentina) I Gorrochategui	7^{7}	6
(United States) M Werdel	6	6
(Croatia) N Ercegović	3	3
(Germany) M Živec-Škulj	4	2
(Mexico) A Gavaldón	6	6
WC	(United Kingdom) A Wainwright	5	6	6
(United States) C Kuhlman	7	4	4
(Germany) C Singer	4	2
(Italy) G Pizzichini	6	6
(France) K Quentrec	4	1
(Netherlands) M Oremans	6	6
(United States) B Bowes	3	3
LL	(Australia) L Field	6	6

Second round
8	(Czech Republic) J Novotná	6	7
(Argentina) I Gorrochategui	0	5
(United States) M Werdel	6	6
(Mexico) A Gavaldón	2	1
WC	(United Kingdom) A Wainwright	4	6^{6}
(Italy) G Pizzichini	6	7^{8}
(Netherlands) M Oremans	6	6
LL	(Australia) L Field	3	2

Third round
8	(Czech Republic) J Novotná	6	6
(United States) M Werdel	3	1
(Italy) G Pizzichini	1	4
(Netherlands) M Oremans	6	6

Fourth round
8	(Czech Republic) J Novotná	7	4	6
(Netherlands) M Oremans	5	6	4

==== Section 6 ====
First round
9	(Germany) A Huber	7	7^{11}
(Sweden) C Dahlman	5	6^{9}
(Slovakia) K Studeníková	4	4
Q	(Italy) L Golarsa	6	6
Q	(South Africa) D van Rensburg	7	1	2
(Germany) C Porwik	5	6	6
(United States) K Po	5	1
(Argentina) F Labat	7	6
(Italy) L Ferrando	6	3	0
(Finland) N Dahlman	1	6	6
(Ukraine) N Medvedeva	3	6	6
(United States) D Graham	6	4	4
(United States) K Rinaldi	2	6	8
(Italy) F Romano	6	2	6
(United States) C Cunningham	5	2
4	(Argentina) G Sabatini	7	6

Second round
9	(Germany) A Huber	6	6
Q	(Italy) L Golarsa	4	0
(Germany) C Porwik	6	1	4
(Argentina) F Labat	3	6	6
(Finland) N Dahlman	6	3	4
(Ukraine) N Medvedeva	1	6	6
(United States) K Rinaldi	2	2
4	(Argentina) G Sabatini	6	6

Third round
9	(Germany) A Huber	6	6
(Argentina) F Labat	4	3
(Ukraine) N Medvedeva	1	6	4
4	(Argentina) G Sabatini	6	2	6

Fourth round
9	(Germany) A Huber	6^{3}	0
4	(Argentina) G Sabatini	7^{7}	6

==== Section 7 ====
First round
5	(United States) MJ Fernández	6	6
(Japan) K Nagatsuka	3	0
(Romania) R Dragomir	6	6
(France) A Fusai	3	1
(United States) Z Garrison-Jackson	6	7
(Germany) S Hack	2	5
Q	(Japan) A Sugiyama	6	3	3
(United States) G Fernández	3	6	6
(Belgium) S Appelmans	4	6	6
(Germany) K Kschwendt	6	4	3
(Germany) S Frankl	6	4	7
Q	(Netherlands) C Wegink	2	6	5
(Czech Republic) A Strnadová	6	6
(Netherlands) K Boogert	2	3
(Belarus) N Zvereva	7	4	6
12	(Bulgaria) K Maleeva	5	6	3

Second round
5	(United States) MJ Fernández	6	6
(Romania) R Dragomir	3	2
(United States) Z Garrison-Jackson	6	4
(United States) G Fernández	4	1^{r}
(Belgium) S Appelmans	6	6
(Germany) S Frankl	2	3
(Czech Republic) A Strnadová	3	2
(Belarus) N Zvereva	6	6

Third round
5	(United States) MJ Fernández	0	1
(United States) Z Garrison-Jackson	6	6
(Belgium) S Appelmans	3	4
(Belarus) N Zvereva	6	6

Fourth round
(United States) Z Garrison-Jackson	5	2
(Belarus) N Zvereva	7	6

==== Section 8 ====
First round
16	(France) N Tauziat	7	6
(Australia) R Stubbs	5	4
WC	(United Kingdom) M Javer	6	6
(Hungary) A Temesvári	2	2
(United States) L Harvey-Wild	0	3
(Germany) B Rittner	6	6
(Germany) V Martinek	0	6	5
(United States) L Davenport	6	4	7
WC	(United Kingdom) K Cross	4	3
(Japan) M Endo	6	6
(Canada) P Hy	7	6
(Japan) R Hiraki	5	3
(Peru) L Gildemeister	2	6	1
(South Africa) R Nideffer	6	4	6
(Australia) M Jaggard-Lai	2	1
2	(United States) M Navratilova	6	6

Second round
16	(France) N Tauziat	6	6
WC	(United Kingdom) M Javer	1	2
(Germany) B Rittner	0	6^{5}
(United States) L Davenport	6	7^{7}
(Japan) M Endo	3	2
(Canada) P Hy	6	6
(South Africa) R Nideffer	0	4
2	(United States) M Navratilova	6	6

Third round
16	(France) N Tauziat	6	7^{7}
(United States) L Davenport	3	6^{5}
(Canada) P Hy	1	0
2	(United States) M Navratilova	6	6

Fourth round
16	(France) N Tauziat	1	3
2	(United States) M Navratilova	6	6

Preceded by 1993 French Open – Women's singles	Grand Slam women's singles	Succeeded by 1993 US Open – Women's singles
