= 1992 Wimbledon Championships – Men's singles qualifying =

Lawn tennis championship

Men's singles qualifying
- 1992 Wimbledon Championships

Events
Singles	men	women		boys	girls
Doubles	men	women	mixed	boys	girls
WC Singles	men	women	quad
WC Doubles	men	women	quad
Legends	men	women	seniors

Qualification
Singles	men	women
Doubles	men	women
- Wimbledon Championships

Players and pairs who neither have high enough rankings nor receive wild cards may participate in a qualifying tournament held one week before the annual Wimbledon Tennis Championships.

== Seeds ==
1. (Australia) John Fitzgerald (qualified)
2. (Canada) Grant Connell (second round)
3. (Germany) Christian Saceanu (qualified)
4. (France) Guillaume Raoux (qualified)
5. (United States) Jonathan Stark (qualified)
6. (Brazil) Fernando Roese (qualifying competition)
7. (Israel) Gilad Bloom (second round)
8. (United States) Chuck Adams (second round)
9. (Sweden) Henrik Holm (qualified)
10. (United States) Robbie Weiss (second round)
11. (Sweden) Peter Lundgren (first round)
12. (Germany) Patrick Baur (first round)
13. (Australia) Carl Limberger (qualifying competition)
14. (Canada) Martin Laurendeau (second round)
15. (Venezuela) Nicolás Pereira (second round)
16. (Sweden) Thomas Högstedt (second round)
17. (Commonwealth of Independent States) Andrei Olhovskiy (qualified)
18. (France) Stéphane Simian (second round)
19. (South Africa) Grant Stafford (qualifying competition)
20. (United States) Steve Bryan (qualified)
21. (South Africa) Marcos Ondruska (qualifying competition)
22. (Argentina) Daniel Orsanic (first round)
23. (Sweden) Lars-Anders Wahlgren (first round)
24. (Italy) Nicola Bruno (first round)
25. (Netherlands) Fernon Wibier (first round)
26. (France) Laurent Prades (first round)
27. (Canada) Greg Rusedski (qualifying competition)
28. (India) Ramesh Krishnan (first round)
29. (Canada) Martin Wostenholme (second round)
30. (Netherlands) Tom Nijssen (qualifying competition)
31. (Brazil) Fabio Silberberg (first round)
32. (Australia) Roger Rasheed (first round)

== Qualifiers ==
1. (Australia) John Fitzgerald
2. (United States) Dave Randall
3. (Germany) Christian Saceanu
4. (France) Guillaume Raoux
5. (United States) Jonathan Stark
6. (United States) Scott Davis
7. (Sweden) Niclas Kroon
8. (United States) Kent Kinnear
9. (Sweden) Henrik Holm
10. (Czechoslovakia) Branislav Stankovič
11. (Australia) Grant Doyle
12. (United States) Rick Leach
13. (United States) Steve Bryan
14. (The Bahamas) Mark Knowles
15. (Commonwealth of Independent States) Andrei Olhovskiy
16. (South Africa) John-Laffnie de Jager

== Qualifying draw ==
=== First qualifier ===
First round
1	(Australia) John Fitzgerald	6	6
(Chile) Pedro Rebolledo	3	2
(Australia) Neil Borwick	6	6
WC	(United Kingdom) Laurence Matthews	3	1
(Italy) Laurence Tieleman	4	6	5
(United States) Richard Schmidt	6	4	7
(South Africa) Robbie Koenig	6	2	6
32	(Australia) Roger Rasheed	4	6	4

Second round
1	(Australia) John Fitzgerald	7^{8}	6
(Australia) Neil Borwick	6^{6}	3
(United States) Richard Schmidt	6^{9}	4
(South Africa) Robbie Koenig	7^{11}	6

Qualifying competition
1	(Australia) John Fitzgerald	6	6	6^{3}	6
(South Africa) Robbie Koenig	4	3	7^{7}	3

=== Second qualifier ===
First round
2	(Canada) Grant Connell	6	7
(Germany) Jörn Grünewald	2	5
(United Kingdom) Danny Sapsford	6	3	0
(United States) Dave Randall	4	6	6
(Puerto Rico) Juan Ríos	7^{7}	3	2
WC	(United Kingdom) Paul Hand	6^{3}	6	6
(Colombia) Mauricio Hadad	6	6
31	(Brazil) Fabio Silberberg	4	1

Second round
2	(Canada) Grant Connell	6	6^{5}	6
(United States) Dave Randall	4	7^{7}	8
WC	(United Kingdom) Paul Hand	5	5
(Colombia) Mauricio Hadad	7	7

Qualifying competition
(United States) Dave Randall	7	6	7^{7}
(Colombia) Mauricio Hadad	5	3	6^{2}

=== Third qualifier ===
First round
3	(Germany) Christian Saceanu	7^{7}	6
(Romania) Mihnea-Ion Năstase	6^{4}	4
(Netherlands) Sander Groen	6	6
(Ecuador) Pablo Campana	1	4
(Netherlands) Mike van den Berg	6^{0}	6	6
(Canada) Daniel Nestor	7^{7}	4	3
(Sweden) Ulf Stenlund	3	6^{3}
30	(Netherlands) Tom Nijssen	6	7^{7}

Second round
3	(Germany) Christian Saceanu	6^{5}	7	6
(Netherlands) Sander Groen	7^{7}	5	4
(Netherlands) Mike van den Berg	6^{10}	4
30	(Netherlands) Tom Nijssen	7^{12}	6

Qualifying competition
3	(Germany) Christian Saceanu	6	7	6^{4}	4	8
30	(Netherlands) Tom Nijssen	4	5	7^{7}	6	6

=== Fourth qualifier ===
First round
4	(France) Guillaume Raoux	4	6	6
(Ivory Coast) Clement N'Goran	6	3	4
(India) Leander Paes	4	3
(United Kingdom) David Ison	6	6
(United States) Glenn Layendecker	6	6
(Spain) Tati Rascón	4	3
(El Salvador) Miguel Merz	4	3
29	(Canada) Martin Wostenholme	6	6

Second round
4	(France) Guillaume Raoux	6	7^{8}
(United Kingdom) David Ison	3	6^{6}
(United States) Glenn Layendecker	6	6
29	(Canada) Martin Wostenholme	4	3

Qualifying competition
4	(France) Guillaume Raoux	6	6^{8}	5	7^{7}	6
(United States) Glenn Layendecker	3	7^{10}	7	6^{5}	4

=== Fifth qualifier ===
First round
5	(United States) Jonathan Stark	4	7^{7}	12
(The Bahamas) Roger Smith	6	6^{5}	10
(Commonwealth of Independent States) Dimitri Poliakov	6	7^{7}
(Italy) Sebastian Soresini	4	6^{4}
WC	(United Kingdom) Colin Beecher	6	6
WC	(United Kingdom) Tim Henman	3	1
(South Africa) Lan Bale	4	4
27	(Canada) Greg Rusedski	6	6

Second round
5	(United States) Jonathan Stark	6	6
(Commonwealth of Independent States) Dimitri Poliakov	3	4
WC	(United Kingdom) Colin Beecher	7^{7}	6^{7}	10
27	(Canada) Greg Rusedski	6^{5}	7^{9}	12

Qualifying competition
5	(United States) Jonathan Stark	7^{7}	4	6	6
27	(Canada) Greg Rusedski	6^{4}	6	3	3

=== Sixth qualifier ===
First round
6	(Brazil) Fernando Roese	6	6
(United States) Phil Williamson	3	2
(Israel) Eyal Ran	3	4
(Senegal) Yahiya Doumbia	6	6
(United States) Doug Eisenman	6^{5}	7^{7}	5
(France) Pierre Bouteyre	7^{7}	6^{3}	7
(United States) Scott Davis	3	7^{9}	6
28	(India) Ramesh Krishnan	6	6^{7}	3

Second round
6	(Brazil) Fernando Roese	4	7^{7}	8
(Senegal) Yahiya Doumbia	6	6^{1}	6
(France) Pierre Bouteyre	4	2
(United States) Scott Davis	6	6

Qualifying competition
6	(Brazil) Fernando Roese	4	4	6	6	3
(United States) Scott Davis	6	6	2	3	6

=== Seventh qualifier ===
First round
7	(Israel) Gilad Bloom	6	6
(Chile) Óscar Bustos	3	2
(Sweden) Niclas Kroon	7^{7}	6
(Colombia) Álvaro Jordan	6^{5}	4
(France) Lionel Roux	6^{4}	4
(United States) Brian Joelson	7^{7}	6
WC	(United Kingdom) Miles Maclagan	7^{8}	5	8
25	(Netherlands) Fernon Wibier	6^{6}	7	6

Second round
7	(Israel) Gilad Bloom	3	4
(Sweden) Niclas Kroon	6	6
(United States) Brian Joelson	6	6
WC	(United Kingdom) Miles Maclagan	1	4

Qualifying competition
(Sweden) Niclas Kroon	6	7^{8}	6
(United States) Brian Joelson	4	6^{6}	3

=== Eighth qualifier ===
First round
8	(United States) Chuck Adams	7^{7}	7
(France) Tarik Benhabiles	6^{3}	5
(Czechoslovakia) Daniel Vacek	6	6
(France) Stéphane Grenier	3	4
(Venezuela) Maurice Ruah	3	3
(United States) Kent Kinnear	6	6
(Belgium) Libor Pimek	6	6^{4}	9
26	(France) Laurent Prades	3	7^{7}	7

Second round
(United States) Chuck Adams	4	6	8
(Czechoslovakia) Daniel Vacek	6	3	10
(United States) Kent Kinnear	7^{7}	6
(Belgium) Libor Pimek	6^{1}	2

Qualifying competition
(Czechoslovakia) Daniel Vacek	6^{6}	4	6	6	7
(United States) Kent Kinnear	7^{8}	6	4	3	9

=== Ninth qualifier ===
First round
9	(Sweden) Henrik Holm	6^{7}	6	6
(Australia) Mark Kratzmann	7^{9}	3	1
(United States) Bret Garnett	2	7^{7}	6
(France) Philippe Pech	6	6^{2}	3
(United States) Jared Palmer	4	6^{4}
(United States) Brad Pearce	6	7
(United States) David Pate	6	7^{11}
23	(Sweden) Lars-Anders Wahlgren	3	6^{9}

Second round
9	(Sweden) Henrik Holm	6	6
(United States) Bret Garnett	3	4
(United States) Brad Pearce	6^{1}	0
(United States) David Pate	7^{7}	6

Qualifying competition
9	(Sweden) Henrik Holm	6	6	6
(United States) David Pate	3	4	0

=== Tenth qualifier ===
First round
10	(United States) Robbie Weiss	6	6
(United States) Keith Evans	4	2
(Mexico) Francisco Maciel	7^{7}	3	2^{r}
(United States) Mike Bauer	6^{5}	6	4
(United States) Mark Keil	7	1	8
(South Africa) Clinton Marsh	5	6	10
(Czechoslovakia) Branislav Stankovič	6^{5}	6	6
24	(Italy) Nicola Bruno	7^{7}	3	3

Second round
(United States) Robbie Weiss	3	3
(United States) Mike Bauer	6	6
(South Africa) Clinton Marsh	1	2
(Czechoslovakia) Branislav Stankovič	6	6

Qualifying competition
(United States) Mike Bauer	6^{9}	4	6	7^{7}	11
(Czechoslovakia) Branislav Stankovič	7^{11}	6	2	6^{5}	13

=== Eleventh qualifier ===
First round
11	(Sweden) Peter Lundgren	3	4
(France) Stéphane Sansoni	6	6
(Australia) Grant Doyle	6	0
(South Africa) Kevin Ullyett	4	0^{r}
(Sweden) Peter Nyborg	6^{3}	6^{4}
(United States) Todd Nelson	7^{7}	7^{7}
(Spain) Daniel Marco	7	6
22	(Argentina) Daniel Orsanic	5	3

Second round
(France) Stéphane Sansoni	6	4	7
(Australia) Grant Doyle	1	6	9
(United States) Todd Nelson	6	6
(Spain) Daniel Marco	3	4

Qualifying competition
(Australia) Grant Doyle	6	6	7^{7}
(United States) Todd Nelson	4	4	6^{4}

=== Twelfth qualifier ===
First round
12	(Germany) Patrick Baur	7^{7}	1	4
(Australia) Patrick Rafter	6^{2}	6	6
(United States) Pat Crow	1	4
WC	(United States) Rick Leach	6	6
(United States) John Stimpson	4	3
(India) Zeeshan Ali	6	6
(South Africa) Marius Barnard	2	5
21	(South Africa) Marcos Ondruska	6	7

Second round
(Australia) Patrick Rafter	6^{3}	1
WC	(United States) Rick Leach	7^{7}	6
(India) Zeeshan Ali	2	1
21	(South Africa) Marcos Ondruska	6	6

Qualifying competition
WC	(United States) Rick Leach	6	5	6	6
21	(South Africa) Marcos Ondruska	3	7	4	4

=== Thirteenth qualifier ===
First round
13	(Australia) Carl Limberger	6	3	6
(Australia) Brent Larkham	3	6	1
(Brazil) José Daher	5	6	11
(Israel) Michael Daniel	7	3	13
(Netherlands) Tom Kempers	6	6
WC	(United Kingdom) Ulli Nganga	4	1
(United States) David Witt	4	4
20	(United States) Steve Bryan	6	6

Second round
13	(Australia) Carl Limberger	4	6	6
(Israel) Michael Daniel	6	3	3
(Netherlands) Tom Kempers	3	7^{9}	8
20	(United States) Steve Bryan	6	6^{7}	10

Qualifying competition
13	(Australia) Carl Limberger	3	4	5
20	(United States) Steve Bryan	6	6	7

=== Fourteenth qualifier ===
First round
14	(Canada) Martin Laurendeau	6	2	12
(United States) Kenny Thorne	4	6	10
(The Bahamas) Mark Knowles	6	7^{7}
(Chile) Sergio Cortés	4	6^{4}
(Brazil) Mauro Menezes	4	2
(Germany) Thomas Gollwitzer	6	6
(United States) Buff Farrow	3	7^{7}	5
19	(South Africa) Grant Stafford	6	6^{5}	7

Second round
14	(Canada) Martin Laurendeau	3	2
(The Bahamas) Mark Knowles	6	6
(Germany) Thomas Gollwitzer	3	4
19	(South Africa) Grant Stafford	6	6

Qualifying competition
(The Bahamas) Mark Knowles	6	7^{7}	5	6
19	(South Africa) Grant Stafford	1	6^{5}	7	4

=== Fifteenth qualifier ===
First round
15	(Venezuela) Nicolás Pereira	6	6
WC	(United Kingdom) Mark Schofield	3	2
(Cuba) Mario Tabares	3	6	8
(Canada) Glenn Michibata	6	1	6
WC	(United Kingdom) Darren Kirk	1	3
(Germany) Rüdiger Haas	6	6
(Argentina) Roberto Saad	1	1
17	(Commonwealth of Independent States) Andrei Olhovskiy	6	6

Second round
15	(Venezuela) Nicolás Pereira	3	3
(Cuba) Mario Tabares	6	6
(Germany) Rüdiger Haas	2	2
17	(Commonwealth of Independent States) Andrei Olhovskiy	6	6

Qualifying competition
(Cuba) Mario Tabares	6	3	7^{10}	6^{2}	7
17	(Commonwealth of Independent States) Andrei Olhovskiy	3	6	6^{8}	7^{7}	9

=== Sixteenth qualifier ===
First round
16	(Sweden) Thomas Högstedt	6	5	6
(Morocco) Younes El Aynaoui	2	7	3
(Haiti) Bertrand Madsen	6^{5}	6	7
(South Africa) John-Laffnie de Jager	7^{7}	4	9
(France) Lionel Barthez	3	1
(United States) Steve DeVries	6	6
(Australia) Jamie Morgan	6^{5}	4
18	(France) Stéphane Simian	7^{7}	6

Second round
16	(Sweden) Thomas Högstedt	3	6	4
(South Africa) John-Laffnie de Jager	6	4	6
(United States) Steve DeVries	6	2	6
18	(France) Stéphane Simian	4	6	3

Qualifying competition
(South Africa) John-Laffnie de Jager	6	3	6	7^{7}
(United States) Steve DeVries	2	6	3	6^{3}
