= 1992 Wimbledon Championships – Men's doubles qualifying =

Men's doubles qualifying
- 1992 Wimbledon Championships

Events
Singles	men	women		boys	girls
Doubles	men	women	mixed	boys	girls
WC Singles	men	women	quad
WC Doubles	men	women	quad
Legends	men	women	seniors

Qualification
Singles	men	women
Doubles	men	women
- Wimbledon Championships

Players and pairs who neither have high enough rankings nor receive wild cards may participate in a qualifying tournament held one week before the annual Wimbledon Tennis Championships.

== Seeds ==
1. (South Africa) John-Laffnie de Jager / (South Africa) Marcos Ondruska (qualified)
2. (United States) Matt Lucena / (Norway) Bent-Ove Pedersen (second round)
3. (Brazil) Mauro Menezes / (Brazil) Fernando Roese (first round)
4. (Sweden) Henrik Holm / (Sweden) Peter Nyborg (qualified)
5. (Venezuela) Nicolás Pereira / (The Bahamas) Roger Smith (second round)
6. (Israel) Gilad Bloom / (Romania) Mihnea-Ion Năstase (qualifying competition)
7. (United States) Mike Bauer / (United States) Brian Joelson (qualified)
8. (South Africa) Lan Bale / (Netherlands) Sander Groen (second round)
9. (Australia) Jamie Morgan / (Australia) Roger Rasheed (first round)
10. (Argentina) Roberto Saad / (Cuba) Mario Tabares (first round)

== Qualifiers ==
1. (South Africa) John-Laffnie de Jager / (South Africa) Marcos Ondruska
2. (France) Arnaud Boetsch / (France) Guillaume Raoux
3. (United States) Doug Eisenman / (The Bahamas) Mark Knowles
4. (Sweden) Henrik Holm / (Sweden) Peter Nyborg
5. (United States) Mike Bauer / (United States) Brian Joelson

== Qualifying draw ==
=== First qualifier ===
First round
1	(South Africa) John-Laffnie de Jager (South Africa) Marcos Ondruska	7	6
(United Kingdom) Nick Fulwood (United Kingdom) Darren Kirk	5	1
(Italy) Ugo Colombini (Germany) Rüdiger Haas	7^{9}	6
(Spain) Daniel Marco (Italy) Laurence Tieleman	6^{7}	3
(Chile) Óscar Bustos (Ecuador) Pablo Campana	1	2
(Sweden) Johan Donar (United States) Alex Nizet	6	6
(South Africa) Robbie Koenig (South Africa) Grant Stafford	7^{7}	7
10	(Argentina) Roberto Saad (Cuba) Mario Tabares	6^{3}	5

Second round
1	(South Africa) John-Laffnie de Jager (South Africa) Marcos Ondruska	6	6
(Italy) Ugo Colombini (Germany) Rüdiger Haas	3	2
(Sweden) Johan Donar (United States) Alex Nizet	7	6
(South Africa) Robbie Koenig (South Africa) Grant Stafford	5	4

Qualifying competition
1	(South Africa) John-Laffnie de Jager (South Africa) Marcos Ondruska	6	6	6
(Sweden) Johan Donar (United States) Alex Nizet	3	4	3

=== Second qualifier ===
First round
2	(United States) Matt Lucena (Norway) Bent-Ove Pedersen	6	4	6
(Haiti) Bertrand Madsen (India) Leander Paes	2	6	2
(United Kingdom) Paul Hand (United Kingdom) James Turner	6	6^{6}	3
(France) Arnaud Boetsch (France) Guillaume Raoux	4	7^{9}	6
(United States) Darryl Hale (United Kingdom) Ross Matheson	4	6^{2}
(Australia) Richard Fromberg (Australia) Pat Rafter	6	7^{7}
(Germany) Patrick Baur (Germany) Christian Saceanu	6	6
9	(Australia) Jamie Morgan (Australia) Roger Rasheed	3	3

Second round
2	(United States) Matt Lucena (Norway) Bent-Ove Pedersen	6	4	4
(France) Arnaud Boetsch (France) Guillaume Raoux	3	6	6
(Australia) Richard Fromberg (Australia) Pat Rafter	6	6
(Germany) Patrick Baur (Germany) Christian Saceanu	3	4

Qualifying competition
(France) Arnaud Boetsch (France) Guillaume Raoux	6	7	7^{7}
(Australia) Richard Fromberg (Australia) Pat Rafter	2	5	6^{3}

=== Third qualifier ===
First round
3	(Brazil) Mauro Menezes (Brazil) Fernando Roese	3	4
(United States) Doug Eisenman (The Bahamas) Mark Knowles	6	6
(Sweden) Niclas Kroon (Sweden) Lars-Anders Wahlgren	6	7^{7}
WC	(United Kingdom) Nick Adams (United Kingdom) David Collins	3	6^{3}
(South Africa) Clinton Marsh (United States) Richard Schmidt	7	4	5
(Canada) Daniel Nestor (Canada) Chris Pridham	5	6	7
(Israel) Michael Daniel (Netherlands) Mike van den Berg	3	4
8	(South Africa) Lan Bale (Netherlands) Sander Groen	6	6

Second round
(United States) Doug Eisenman (The Bahamas) Mark Knowles	7^{8}	6
(Sweden) Niclas Kroon (Sweden) Lars-Anders Wahlgren	6^{6}	3
(Canada) Daniel Nestor (Canada) Chris Pridham	7^{7}	6
8	(South Africa) Lan Bale (Netherlands) Sander Groen	6^{4}	2

Qualifying competition
(United States) Doug Eisenman (The Bahamas) Mark Knowles	6	6^{2}	6	6^{7}	6
(Canada) Daniel Nestor (Canada) Chris Pridham	4	7^{7}	3	7^{9}	3

=== Fourth qualifier ===
First round
4	(Sweden) Henrik Holm (Sweden) Peter Nyborg	6^{8}	6	14
WC	(United Kingdom) Colin Beecher (United Kingdom) Mark Schofield	7^{10}	3	12
(Canada) Martin Laurendeau (Venezuela) Maurice Ruah
(United States) Ian Aler (United States) Keith Evans	w/o
(United States) Buff Farrow (Australia) Brent Larkham	6	7^{7}
(United States) Chuck Adams (United States) Martin Blackman	3	6^{3}
(Colombia) Mauricio Hadad (Colombia) Álvaro Jordan	5	6^{7}
6	(Israel) Gilad Bloom (Romania) Mihnea-Ion Năstase	7	7^{9}

Second round
4	(Sweden) Henrik Holm (Sweden) Peter Nyborg	7	6
(Canada) Martin Laurendeau (Venezuela) Maurice Ruah	5	3
(United States) Buff Farrow (Australia) Brent Larkham	6	6^{6}	4
6	(Israel) Gilad Bloom (Romania) Mihnea-Ion Năstase	4	7^{8}	6

Qualifying competition
4	(Sweden) Henrik Holm (Sweden) Peter Nyborg	6^{5}	7^{7}	6	6
6	(Israel) Gilad Bloom (Romania) Mihnea-Ion Năstase	7^{7}	6^{5}	2	1

=== Fifth qualifier ===
First round
5	(Venezuela) Nicolás Pereira (The Bahamas) Roger Smith	7^{7}	6^{9}	6
(Brazil) José Daher (Brazil) Fabio Silberberg	6^{4}	7^{11}	2
(United States) Tom Mercer (United States) Phil Williamson	4	4
(Senegal) Yahiya Doumbia (Ivory Coast) Clement N'Goran	6	6
(Australia) Wayne Arthurs (South Africa) Marius Barnard	6	6
(Argentina) Daniel Orsanic (Netherlands) Fernon Wibier	4	4
(France) Stéphane Sansoni (France) Stéphane Simian	6^{6}	4
7	(United States) Mike Bauer (United States) Brian Joelson	7^{8}	6

Second round
5	(Venezuela) Nicolás Pereira (The Bahamas) Roger Smith	4	6	12
(Senegal) Yahiya Doumbia (Ivory Coast) Clement N'Goran	6	2	14
(Australia) Wayne Arthurs (South Africa) Marius Barnard	4	4
7	(United States) Mike Bauer (United States) Brian Joelson	6	6

Qualifying competition
(Senegal) Yahiya Doumbia (Ivory Coast) Clement N'Goran	6	6	6^{5}	4	4
7	(United States) Mike Bauer (United States) Brian Joelson	3	2	7^{7}	6	6
