= 1992 Wimbledon Championships – Boys' singles =

Boys' singles
- 1992 Wimbledon Championships

Final
- Champion: (Czechoslovakia) David Škoch
- Runner-up: (United States) Brian Dunn
- Score: 6–4, 6–3

Events
Singles	men	women		boys	girls
Doubles	men	women	mixed	boys	girls
WC Singles	men	women	quad
WC Doubles	men	women	quad
Legends	men	women	seniors
- Wimbledon Championships

David Škoch defeated Brian Dunn in the final, 6–4, 6–3 to win the boys' singles tennis title at the 1992 Wimbledon Championships.

== Seeds ==
1. (Australia) Grant Doyle (quarterfinals)
2. (Chile) Gabriel Silberstein (first round)
3. (Romania) Andrei Pavel (semifinals)
4. (United States) Brian Dunn (final)
5. (Brazil) Adriano Ferreira (second round)
6. (United Kingdom) Andrew Richardson (second round)
7. (United Kingdom) Miles Maclagan (semifinals)
8. (South Korea) Song Hyeong-keun (third round)
9. (Israel) Noam Behr (first round)
10. (Czechoslovakia) David Škoch (champion)
11. (Argentina) Gustavo Díaz (first round)
12. (India) Nitin Kirtane (second round)
13. (Thailand) Nathapol Ploysuk (first round)
14. (Argentina) Andrés Zingman (first round)
15. (Czechoslovakia) Filip Kaščák (second round)
16. (Austria) Herbert Wiltschnig (first round)

Click on the seed number of a player to go to their draw section.

== Draw ==
Key

- Q = Qualifier
- WC = Wild card
- LL = Lucky loser
- Alt = Alternate
- ITF = ITF entry
- PR = Protected ranking
- SR = Special ranking
- SE = Special exempt
- JE = Junior exempt
- JR = Junior Accelerator Programme entrant
- CO = College Accelerator Programme entrant
- NG = Next Gen Accelerator Program entrant
- w/o = Walkover
- r = Retired
- d = Defaulted

=== Finals ===
Quarterfinals
1	(Australia) Grant Doyle	5	3
10	(Czechoslovakia) David Škoch	7	6
3	(Romania) Andrei Pavel	6	6
(Hungary) Attila Sávolt	3	3
(Switzerland) Stéphane Manai	2	6^{4}
4	(United States) Brian Dunn	6	7^{7}
7	(United Kingdom) Miles Maclagan	6	6
(Nigeria) Sule Ladipo	3	0

Semifinals
10	(Czechoslovakia) David Škoch	7	5	6
3	(Romania) Andrei Pavel	5	7	4
4	(United States) Brian Dunn	6	6
7	(United Kingdom) Miles Maclagan	2	4

Final
10	(Czechoslovakia) David Škoch	6	6
4	(United States) Brian Dunn	4	3

=== Top half ===
==== Section 1 ====
First round
1	(Australia) Grant Doyle	6	6
(Thailand) Supparat Chukwan	0	0
(Austria) Stefan Leiner	6	6
(Germany) Alex Rădulescu	4	4
(United Kingdom) Barry Cowan	6	5	6
(Argentina) Gerónimo Degreef	3	7	4
(Commonwealth of Independent States) Pavel Joromsky	1	4
15	(Czechoslovakia) Filip Kaščák	6	6
10	(Czechoslovakia) David Škoch	7	6
(Brazil) Gustavo Fernandes	5	2
(Mexico) Enrique Abaroa	6	6
(United Kingdom) Tim Henman	2	2
(United States) Vince Spadea	6	6
(India) Rohit Reddy	4	0
(Ivory Coast) Ilou Lonfo	6^{1}	4
8	(South Korea) Song Hyeong-keun	7^{7}	6

Second round
1	(Australia) G Doyle	6	6
(Austria) S Leiner	3	3
(United Kingdom) B Cowan	7	6
15	(Czechoslovakia) F Kaščák	5	1
10	(Czechoslovakia) D Škoch	6	0	6
(Mexico) E Abaroa	4	6	2
(United States) V Spadea	6^{9}	2
8	(South Korea) H-k Song	7^{11}	6

Third round
1	(Australia) G Doyle	6	6
(United Kingdom) B Cowan	2	2
10	(Czechoslovakia) D Škoch	6	2	6
8	(South Korea) H-k Song	2	6	2

Quarterfinals
1	(Australia) G Doyle	5	3
10	(Czechoslovakia) D Škoch	7	6

==== Section 2 ====
First round
3	(Romania) Andrei Pavel	5	6	6
(Brazil) Pedro Braga	7	4	4
(Germany) Björn Jacob	6	6
(United Kingdom) Jamie Delgado	1	1
(France) Grégory Carraz	6	7
(Thailand) Sarawuth Yongchantanasukul	2	5
(Australia) Scott Draper	6	6
14	(Argentina) Andrés Zingman	1	2
11	(Argentina) Gustavo Díaz	1	2
(Hong Kong) Sven Koehler	6	6
(United States) Eric Taino	4	3
(India) Mahesh Bhupathi	6	6
(Hungary) Attila Sávolt	4	6	6
(Mexico) Erik Casas	6	3	1
(Japan) Takao Suzuki	0	3
6	(United Kingdom) Andrew Richardson	6	6

Second round
3	(Romania) A Pavel	3	6	6
(Germany) B Jacob	6	1	4
(France) G Carraz	6	6
(Australia) S Draper	2	4
(Hong Kong) S Koehler	6	6
(India) M Bhupathi	2	3
(Hungary) A Sávolt	6	6
6	(United Kingdom) A Richardson	4	4

Third round
3	(Romania) A Pavel	7^{7}	6
(France) G Carraz	6^{3}	3
(Hong Kong) S Koehler	3	6	3
(Hungary) A Sávolt	6	3	6

Quarterfinals
3	(Romania) A Pavel	6	6
(Hungary) A Sávolt	3	3

=== Bottom half ===
==== Section 3 ====
First round
5	(Brazil) Adriano Ferreira	6	7^{8}
(Czechoslovakia) David Miketa	3	6^{6}
(Switzerland) Stéphane Manai	6^{4}	6	6
(Argentina) Gastón Etlis	7^{7}	3	2
(New Zealand) Steven Downs	6	6
(United Kingdom) Lee Sabin	3	4
(Sweden) Fredrik Bergh	6^{9}	5
12	(India) Nitin Kirtane	7^{11}	6
13	(Thailand) Nathapol Ploysuk	6^{2}	2
(Israel) Tal Harel Ben Simon	7^{7}	6
(Australia) Allen Belobrajdic	6	1	0
(South Africa) Neville Godwin	3	6	6
(United Kingdom) Daniel Sanders	7^{7}	7^{7}
(Argentina) Leonardo Olguín	6^{3}	6^{4}
(Mexico) José Jorge Esqueda Hernández	6	1	6
4	(United States) Brian Dunn	4	6	8

Second round
5	(Brazil) A Ferreira	4	4
(Switzerland) S Manai	6	6
(New Zealand) S Downs	7^{8}	6
12	(India) N Kirtane	6^{6}	3
(Israel) T Harel Ben Simon	5	5
(South Africa) N Godwin	7	7
(United Kingdom) D Sanders	3	3
4	(United States) B Dunn	6	6

Third round
(Switzerland) S Manai	7^{7}	6
(New Zealand) S Downs	6^{5}	3
(South Africa) N Godwin	7	5	1
4	(United States) B Dunn	5	7	6

Quarterfinals
(Switzerland) S Manai	2	6^{4}
4	(United States) B Dunn	6	7^{7}

==== Section 4 ====
First round
7	(United Kingdom) Miles Maclagan	6	6
(Philippines) Michael-John Misa	0	1
(Peru) César Reano	2	4
(Argentina) Lucas Arnold Ker	6	6
(France) Olivier Tauma	6	6
(India) Vasudeva Reddy	4	3
(United States) Jimmy Jackson	7^{8}	6
9	(Israel) Noam Behr	6^{6}	3
16	(Austria) Herbert Wiltschnig	7^{7}	3	2
(New Zealand) James Greenhalgh	6^{2}	6	6
(Australia) Steven Baldas	6	7^{7}
(United Kingdom) Mark Schofield	4	6^{2}
(Nigeria) Sule Ladipo	7	6
(Morocco) Salahaddine Adbib	5	3
(Indonesia) Champy Halim	4	7^{8}	7
2	(Chile) Gabriel Silberstein	6	6^{6}	5

Second round
7	(United Kingdom) M Maclagan	6	7^{7}
(Argentina) L Arnold Ker	3	6^{5}
(France) O Tauma	6	3	6
(United States) J Jackson	2	6	4
(New Zealand) J Greenhalgh	7	3	13
(Australia) S Baldas	5	6	15
(Nigeria) S Ladipo	6	6
(Indonesia) C Halim	3	1

Third round
7	(United Kingdom) M Maclagan	7	6
(France) O Tauma	5	3
(Australia) S Baldas	3	6	5
(Nigeria) S Ladipo	6	1	7

Quarterfinals
7	(United Kingdom) M Maclagan	6	6
(Nigeria) S Ladipo	3	0
