= 1992 Wimbledon Championships – Boys' doubles =

Tennis tournament

Boys' doubles
- 1992 Wimbledon Championships

Final
- Champions: (Australia) Steven Baldas (Australia) Scott Draper
- Runners-up: (India) Mahesh Bhupathi (India) Nitin Kirtane
- Score: 6–1, 4–6, 9–7

Events
Singles	men	women		boys	girls
Doubles	men	women	mixed	boys	girls
WC Singles	men	women	quad
WC Doubles	men	women	quad
Legends	men	women	seniors
← 1991 ·	Wimbledon Championships	· 1993 →

Steven Baldas and Scott Draper defeated Mahesh Bhupathi and Nitin Kirtane in the final, 6–1, 4–6, 9–7 to win the boys' doubles tennis title at the 1992 Wimbledon Championships.

== Seeds ==
1. (United Kingdom) Miles Maclagan / (United Kingdom) Andrew Richardson (semifinals)
2. (Argentina) Gerónimo Degreef / (Argentina) Andrés Zingman (second round)
3. (Australia) Steven Baldas / (Australia) Scott Draper (champions)
4. (Mexico) Enrique Abaroa / (Germany) Alex Rădulescu (semifinals)
5. (Australia) Grant Doyle / (Romania) Andrei Pavel (quarterfinals)
6. (Czechoslovakia) Filip Kaščák / (Czechoslovakia) David Škoch (second round)
7. (Mexico) Erik Casas / (Brazil) Adriano Ferreira (first round)
8. (United Kingdom) Daniel Sanders / (United Kingdom) Mark Schofield (second round)

== Draw ==
=== Key ===
- Q = Qualifier
- WC = Wild card
- LL = Lucky loser
- Alt = Alternate
- SE = Special exempt
- PR = Protected ranking
- ITF = ITF entry
- JE = Junior exempt
- w/o = Walkover
- r = Retired
- d = Defaulted
- SR = Special ranking

=== Finals ===
Semifinals
1	(United Kingdom) Miles Maclagan (United Kingdom) Andrew Richardson	6^{5}	4
3	(Australia) Steven Baldas (Australia) Scott Draper	7^{7}	6
4	(Mexico) Enrique Abaroa (Germany) Alex Rădulescu	3	4
(India) Mahesh Bhupathi (India) Nitin Kirtane	6	6

Final
3	(Australia) Steven Baldas (Australia) Scott Draper	6	4	9
(India) Mahesh Bhupathi (India) Nitin Kirtane	1	6	7

=== Top half ===
First round
1	(United Kingdom) Miles Maclagan (United Kingdom) Andrew Richardson	4	6	6
(Israel) Noam Behr (Indonesia) Champy Halim	6	1	0
(South Africa) Neville Godwin (South Africa) Gareth Williams	6	7^{7}
(New Zealand) Steven Downs (Commonwealth of Independent States) Pavel Joromsky	2	6^{4}
(Peru) Jorge Jaramillo (India) Bikram Saluja	4	2
(United Kingdom) Nick Baglin (United Kingdom) Matthew Coombs	6	6
(Thailand) Nathapol Ploysuk (Japan) Takao Suzuki	6	6
7	(Mexico) Erik Casas (Brazil) Adriano Ferreira	3	4
3	(Australia) Steven Baldas (Australia) Scott Draper	6	3	6
(Austria) Stefan Leiner (Austria) Herbert Wiltschnig	4	6	0
(United States) Jimmy Jackson (United States) Eric Taino	6^{5}	7	6
(United Kingdom) Barry Cowan (United Kingdom) Lee Sabin	7^{7}	5	3
(Switzerland) Stéphane Manai (Hungary) Attila Sávolt	4	2
(Argentina) Lucas Arnold Ker (Argentina) Gastón Etlis	6	6
(Philippines) Michael-John Misa (India) Vasudeva Reddy	1	1
6	(Czechoslovakia) Filip Kaščák (Czechoslovakia) David Škoch	6	6

Second round
1	(United Kingdom) M Maclagan (United Kingdom) A Richardson	6	5	9
(South Africa) N Godwin (South Africa) G Williams	3	7	7
(United Kingdom) N Baglin (United Kingdom) M Coombs	7^{7}	7
(Thailand) N Ploysuk (Japan) T Suzuki	6^{2}	5
3	(Australia) S Baldas (Australia) S Draper	6	6
(United States) J Jackson (United States) E Taino	2	4
(Argentina) L Arnold Ker (Argentina) G Etlis	6	6
6	(Czechoslovakia) F Kaščák (Czechoslovakia) D Škoch	0	4

Quarterfinals
1	(United Kingdom) M Maclagan (United Kingdom) A Richardson	5	7^{7}	6
(United Kingdom) N Baglin (United Kingdom) M Coombs	7	6^{1}	2
3	(Australia) S Baldas (Australia) S Draper	6	6^{3}	6
(Argentina) L Arnold Ker (Argentina) G Etlis	1	7^{7}	3

Semifinals
1	(United Kingdom) M Maclagan (United Kingdom) A Richardson	6^{5}	4
3	(Australia) S Baldas (Australia) S Draper	7^{7}	6

=== Bottom half ===
First round
5	(Australia) Grant Doyle (Romania) Andrei Pavel	4	6	6
(United States) Brian Dunn (United States) Vince Spadea	6	3	3
(Argentina) Gustavo Díaz (Argentina) Leonardo Olguín	7^{7}	4	3
(United Kingdom) Jamie Delgado (United Kingdom) Tim Henman	6^{1}	6	6
(New Zealand) James Greenhalgh (Peru) César Reano	6	4	6
(Brazil) Pedro Braga (Brazil) Gustavo Fernandes	4	6	4
(Germany) Björn Jacob (Czechoslovakia) David Miketa	6^{3}	3
4	(Mexico) Enrique Abaroa (Germany) Alex Rădulescu	7^{7}	6
8	(United Kingdom) Daniel Sanders (United Kingdom) Mark Schofield
(Morocco) Salahaddine Adbib (Israel) Tal Harel Ben Simon	w/o
(Mexico) José Jorge Esqueda Hernández (Chile) Gabriel Silberstein	1	2
(India) Mahesh Bhupathi (India) Nitin Kirtane	6	6
(Nigeria) Sule Ladipo (Ivory Coast) Ilou Lonfo	7^{7}	4	7
(Hong Kong) Sven Koehler (South Korea) Song Hyeong-keun	6^{4}	6	5
(Thailand) Supparat Chukwan (Thailand) Sarawuth Yongchantanasukul	4	2
2	(Argentina) Gerónimo Degreef (Argentina) Andrés Zingman	6	6

Second round
5	(Australia) G Doyle (Romania) A Pavel	6	6
(United Kingdom) J Delgado (United Kingdom) T Henman	4	3
(New Zealand) J Greenhalgh (Peru) C Reano	7^{7}	3	2
4	(Mexico) E Abaroa (Germany) A Rădulescu	6^{5}	6	6
8	(United Kingdom) D Sanders (United Kingdom) M Schofield	5	6	3
(India) M Bhupathi (India) N Kirtane	7	4	6
(Nigeria) S Ladipo (Ivory Coast) I Lonfo	6	6
2	(Argentina) G Degreef (Argentina) A Zingman	3	4

Quarterfinals
5	(Australia) G Doyle (Romania) A Pavel	6	3	4
4	(Mexico) E Abaroa (Germany) A Rădulescu	3	6	6
(India) M Bhupathi (India) N Kirtane	7	6
2	(Nigeria) S Ladipo (Ivory Coast) I Lonfo	5	3

Semifinals
4	(Mexico) E Abaroa (Germany) A Rădulescu	3	4
(India) M Bhupathi (India) N Kirtane	6	6
