= Mike van den Berg =

Dutch tennis coach

- Full name: Michael van den Berg
- Country (sports): Netherlands
- Born: 2 April 1968 (age 56)

Singles
- Highest ranking: No. 368 (11 May 1992)

Grand Slam singles results
- Wimbledon: Q2 (1992)

Doubles
- Career record: 0–1 (ATP Tour)
- Highest ranking: No. 279 (12 Oct 1992)

Grand Slam doubles results
- Wimbledon: Q1 (1992)

Michael van den Berg (born 2 April 1968) is a Dutch tennis coach and former professional player. He has worked as a coach with several players including Amanda Hopmans and Claudine Schaul.

Active on tour in the early 1990s, van den Berg reached a career high singles world ranking of 368. He featured in the qualifying draw for the 1992 Wimbledon Championships and was unable to progress, but did win a match against Daniel Nestor. Competing on doubles, he had an ATP Tour main draw appearance in 1992 at Hilversum and also won that year's Segovia Challenger tournament, partnering Joost Wijnhoud in both.

== ATP Challenger titles ==
=== Doubles: (1) ===
No.	Date	Tournament	Surface	Partner	Opponents	Score
1.	Aug 1992	Open Castilla y León; Segovia, Spain	Hard	(Netherlands) Joost Wijnhoud	(Nigeria) Nduka Odizor (Argentina) Roberto Saad	7–6, 7–6
