= Colette Hall =

British tennis player

Colette Caple
- Full name: Colette Caple (Hall)
- Country (sports): United Kingdom
- Born: 3 July 1973 (age 51); Weymouth, Dorset, England
- Prize money: $31,010

Singles
- Highest ranking: No. 322 (21 September 1992)

Grand Slam singles results
- Wimbledon: 1R (1992, 1993)

Doubles
- Highest ranking: No. 396 (8 June 1992)

Grand Slam doubles results
- Wimbledon: 1R (1992)

Colette Caple (born 3 July 1973) is a British former professional tennis player. During her career she was known as Colette Hall.

Raised in the town of Weymouth in Dorset, Hall competed on the professional tennis circuit in the early 1990s, reaching a best singles ranking of 322 in the world.

Hall twice competed as a wildcard in the singles main draw at Wimbledon, losing in the first round to 12th seed Katerina Maleeva in 1992, then Larisa Neiland in 1993.

== ITF finals ==
=== Singles (0–1) ===
Outcome	Date	Tournament	Surface	Opponent	Score
Runner-up	10 May 1992	Bath, United Kingdom	Clay	(United Kingdom) Sara Gomer	1–6, 0–6

=== Doubles (0–1) ===
Outcome	Date	Tournament	Surface	Partner	Opponents	Score
Runner-up	26 April 1993	Lee-on-Solent, United Kingdom	Hard	(United Kingdom) Valda Lake	(Zimbabwe) Paula Iversen (United Kingdom) Michele Mair	2–6, 4–6
