= 1992 Wimbledon Championships – Men's singles =

Men's singles
- 1992 Wimbledon Championships

Final
- Champion: (United States) Andre Agassi
- Runner-up: (Croatia) Goran Ivanišević
- Score: 6–7^{(8–10)}, 6–4, 6–4, 1–6, 6–4

Details
- Draw: 128 (16Q / 8WC)
- Seeds: 16

Events
Singles	men	women		boys	girls
Doubles	men	women	mixed	boys	girls
WC Singles	men	women	quad
WC Doubles	men	women	quad
Legends	men	women	seniors
- Wimbledon Championships

Andre Agassi defeated Goran Ivanišević in the final, 6–7^{(8–10)}, 6–4, 6–4, 1–6, 6–4 to win the gentlemen's singles tennis title at the 1992 Wimbledon Championships. It was his first major title (following three runner-up finishes), and his first leg of an eventual career Golden Slam. Ivanisević was the first player representing Croatia to reach a major final. (Note: Ivanisević became the first player representing Croatia as an independent country following its independence from Yugoslavia in 1991. Nikola Pilić was the first Croatian to reach a major final at the 1973 French Open, but did so when Croatia was part of Yugoslavia.)

Michael Stich was the defending champion, but lost in the quarterfinals to Pete Sampras.

Reigning Australian Open and French Open champion Jim Courier was attempting to become the first man to achieve the Surface Slam (winning major titles on hard court, clay and grass in the same calendar year). He lost to Andrei Olhovskiy in the third round.

This tournament marked the last Wimbledon singles appearances of three-time champion John McEnroe and two-time champion Jimmy Connors; McEnroe was defeated in the semifinals by Agassi, while Connors was defeated in the first round by Luis Herrera. This was the last professional tennis tournament in which Ivan Lendl represented Czechoslovakia. He gained citizenship of the United States on 7 July 1992, and from then on represented the U.S. for the remainder of his tennis career.

== Seeds ==
1. (United States) Jim Courier (third round)
2. (Sweden) Stefan Edberg (quarterfinals)
3. (Germany) Michael Stich (quarterfinals)
4. (Germany) Boris Becker (quarterfinals)
5. (United States) Pete Sampras (semifinals)
6. (Czechoslovakia) Petr Korda (second round)
7. (United States) Michael Chang (first round)
8. (Croatia) Goran Ivanišević (final)

9. (France) Guy Forget (quarterfinals)
10. (Czechoslovakia) Ivan Lendl (fourth round)
11. (Netherlands) Richard Krajicek (third round)
12. (United States) Andre Agassi (champion)
13. (United States) Brad Gilbert (third round)
14. (South Africa) Wayne Ferreira (fourth round)
15. (Commonwealth of Independent States) Alexander Volkov (third round)
16. (United States) David Wheaton (third round)

Click on the seed number of a player to go to their draw section.

== Draw ==
Key

- Q = Qualifier
- WC = Wild card
- LL = Lucky loser
- Alt = Alternate
- ITF = ITF entry
- PR = Protected ranking
- SR = Special ranking
- SE = Special exempt
- JE = Junior exempt
- JR = Junior Accelerator Programme entrant
- CO = College Accelerator Programme entrant
- NG = Next Gen Accelerator Program entrant
- w/o = Walkover
- r = Retired
- d = Defaulted

=== Finals ===
Quarterfinals
(United States) John McEnroe	6	7^{11}	6
9	(France) Guy Forget	2	6^{9}	3
4	(Germany) Boris Becker	6	2	2	6	3
12	(United States) Andre Agassi	4	6	6	4	6
5	(United States) Pete Sampras	6	6	6
3	(Germany) Michael Stich	3	2	4
8	(Croatia) Goran Ivanišević	6^{10}	7	6	3	6
2	(Sweden) Stefan Edberg	7^{12}	5	1	6	3

Semifinals
(United States) John McEnroe	4	2	3
12	(United States) Andre Agassi	6	6	6
5	(United States) Pete Sampras	7^{7}	6^{5}	4	2
8	(Croatia) Goran Ivanišević	6^{4}	7^{7}	6	6

Final
12	(United States) Andre Agassi	6^{8}	6	6	1	6
8	(Croatia) Goran Ivanišević	7^{10}	4	4	6	4

=== Top half ===
==== Section 1 ====
First round
1	(United States) J Courier	6	6	6
(Germany) M Zoecke	2	2	3
(France) F Fontang	2	5	1
(Zimbabwe) B Black	6	7	6
(Germany) C-U Steeb	6^{6}	2	7^{9}	1
Q	(United States) K Kinnear	7^{8}	6	6^{7}	6
Q	(Commonwealth of Independent States) A Olhovskiy	6	3	6	3	7
Q	(United States) J Stark	4	6	3	6	5
WC	(Australia) P Cash	6	6	7^{7}
(Netherlands) J Eltingh	4	4	6^{3}
(Brazil) L Mattar	7	1	3	3
(United States) J McEnroe	5	6	6	6
(Argentina) H de la Peña	1	0	3
(United States) T Martin	6	6	6
(Spain) F Clavet	3	3	3
16	(United States) D Wheaton	6	6	6

Second round
1	(United States) J Courier	6	6	6
(Zimbabwe) B Black	4	1	4
Q	(United States) K Kinnear	4	6^{1}	3
Q	(Commonwealth of Independent States) A Olhovskiy	6	7^{7}	6
WC	(Australia) P Cash	7^{7}	4	7^{7}	3	2
(United States) J McEnroe	6^{3}	6	6^{1}	6	6
(United States) T Martin	3	3	7^{7}	3
16	(United States) D Wheaton	6	6	6^{2}	6

Third round
1	(United States) J Courier	4	6	4	4
Q	(Commonwealth of Independent States) A Olhovskiy	6	4	6	6
(United States) J McEnroe	6	6	6
16	(United States) D Wheaton	3	4	4

Fourth round
Q	(Commonwealth of Independent States) A Olhovskiy	5	3	6^{10}
(United States) J McEnroe	7	6	7^{12}

==== Section 2 ====
First round
9	(France) G Forget	6	3	7	7^{7}
(Germany) A Mronz	3	6	5	6^{5}
(Sweden) A Järryd	6	6	6
WC	(United Kingdom) C Bailey	4	3	0
(Germany) B Karbacher	2	7	2	6	6
(France) R Gilbert	6	5	6	4	4
(Argentina) R Azar	3	0	3
WC	(France) H Leconte	6	6	6
(Mexico) L Lavalle	6	6	7^{7}
WC	(United Kingdom) A Castle	4	0	6^{4}
(United States) R Reneberg	7	4	6	6^{3}	3
(France) T Champion	5	6	3	7^{7}	6
(Spain) J Sánchez	6	7^{7}	5	3	9
Q	(France) G Raoux	4	6^{3}	7	6	7
(United Kingdom) J Bates	6	6	6
7	(United States) M Chang	4	3	3

Second round
9	(France) G Forget	4	6	3	6	10
(Sweden) A Järryd	6	3	6	3	8
(Germany) B Karbacher	5	2	6^{3}
WC	(France) H Leconte	7	6	7^{7}
(Mexico) L Lavalle	6^{5}	3	7	5
(France) T Champion	7^{7}	6	5	7
(Spain) J Sánchez	6^{4}	3	4
(United Kingdom) J Bates	7^{7}	6	6

Third round
9	(France) G Forget	7^{7}	6	3	6
WC	(France) H Leconte	6^{4}	3	6	3
(France) T Champion	5	4	7^{7}	6	4
(United Kingdom) J Bates	7	6	6^{3}	4	6

Fourth round
9	(France) G Forget	6^{10}	6	3	7^{7}	6
(United Kingdom) J Bates	7^{12}	4	6	6^{2}	3

==== Section 3 ====
First round
4	(Germany) B Becker	7	6	7
(Italy) O Camporese	5	3	5
(Czechoslovakia) M Damm	6	6	6
(Canada) C Pridham	4	4	4
(United States) K Curren	6	6^{5}	6	6^{5}	7
(United States) B Shelton	3	7^{7}	4	7^{7}	9
Q	(United States) R Leach	1	6^{4}	6	6	3
(France) O Delaître	6	7^{7}	3	3	6
(United States) J Connors	2	6	5	3
(Mexico) L Herrera	6	1	7	6
(United States) M Washington	5	4	1
(Japan) S Matsuoka	7	6	6
(South Africa) C van Rensburg	7^{7}	6	7
(United States) J Tarango	6^{5}	4	5
Q	(Australia) J Fitzgerald	2	2	7^{7}	5
14	(South Africa) W Ferreira	6	6	6^{2}	7

Second round
4	(Germany) B Becker	4	6	6	3	6
(Czechoslovakia) M Damm	6	4	4	6	3
(United States) B Shelton	7^{7}	6	6
(France) O Delaître	6^{5}	3	3
(Mexico) L Herrera	6	6	5	4	6
(Japan) S Matsuoka	4	4	7	6	3
(South Africa) C van Rensburg	3	3	7^{7}	3
14	(South Africa) W Ferreira	6	6	6^{3}	6

Third round
4	(Germany) B Becker	6	3	7^{7}	7^{7}
(United States) B Shelton	4	6	6^{5}	6^{5}
(Mexico) L Herrera	6^{4}	1	6	0
14	(South Africa) W Ferreira	7^{7}	6	4	6

Fourth round
4	(Germany) B Becker	3	6	6	6^{6}	6
14	(South Africa) W Ferreira	6	3	4	7^{8}	1

==== Section 4 ====
First round
12	(United States) A Agassi	5	6	7	7
(Commonwealth of Independent States) A Chesnokov	7	1	5	5
(Belgium) E Masso	6^{5}	6	6	2	6
Q	(Sweden) N Kroon	7^{7}	4	2	6	4
(Peru) J Yzaga	6	6	6
(Spain) M A Górriz	4	4	2
(United States) D Rostagno	2	6	6	6
(Spain) T Carbonell	6	1	1	2
(France) C Pioline	6	3	6	7
(Italy) C Pistolesi	3	6	3	5
Q	(Germany) C Saceanu	7	6	2	7
(Argentina) G Markus	5	3	6	5
(Switzerland) J Hlasek	6	6	6
(Netherlands) M Schapers	4	3	2
(Sweden) C Bergström	5	6^{4}	4
6	(Czechoslovakia) P Korda	7	7^{7}	6

Second round
12	(United States) A Agassi	4	6	6	6
(Belgium) E Masso	6	1	3	3
(Peru) J Yzaga	3	3	1
(United States) D Rostagno	6	6	6
(France) C Pioline	6	4	6	5	5
Q	(Germany) C Saceanu	4	6	0	7	7
(Switzerland) J Hlasek	4	3	6	7^{9}	16
6	(Czechoslovakia) P Korda	6	6	3	6^{7}	14

Third round
12	(United States) A Agassi	6	7^{7}	7
(United States) D Rostagno	3	6^{5}	5
Q	(Germany) C Saceanu	7^{7}	3	6	1	6
(Switzerland) J Hlasek	6^{3}	6	3	6	3

Fourth round
12	(United States) A Agassi	7^{7}	6	7^{7}
Q	(Germany) C Saceanu	6^{1}	1	6^{0}

=== Bottom half ===
==== Section 5 ====
First round
5	(United States) P Sampras	6	6	6
(Commonwealth of Independent States) A Cherkasov	1	3	3
(Australia) T Woodbridge	6	7	6
LL	(Brazil) F Roese	2	5	4
(Italy) D Nargiso	3	6	7^{7}	5	3
(Germany) K Braasch	6	3	6^{5}	7	6
(Switzerland) C Mezzadri	1	3	3
Q	(United States) S Davis	6	6	6
(Spain) F Roig	6	6	6
(Argentina) C Miniussi	2	3	4
(France) A Boetsch	7^{7}	7	6
(United States) J Grabb	6^{5}	5	4
(Australia) J Stoltenberg	3	5	6	6	5
(Netherlands) P Haarhuis	6	7	4	4	7
Q	(South Africa) J-L de Jager	5	1	2
11	(Netherlands) R Krajicek	7	6	6

Second round
5	(United States) P Sampras	7^{7}	7^{7}	6^{7}	6
(Australia) T Woodbridge	6^{2}	6^{4}	7^{9}	4
(Germany) K Braasch	7^{7}	6^{5}	6^{3}	3
Q	(United States) S Davis	6^{5}	7^{7}	7^{7}	6
(Spain) F Roig	4	2	2
(France) A Boetsch	6	6	6
(Netherlands) P Haarhuis	6^{6}	3	1
11	(Netherlands) R Krajicek	7^{8}	6	6

Third round
5	(United States) P Sampras	6	6	6
Q	(United States) S Davis	1	0	2
(France) A Boetsch	4	7^{8}	3	7^{7}	6
11	(Netherlands) R Krajicek	6	6^{6}	6	6^{5}	2

Fourth round
5	(United States) P Sampras	6	7	7^{11}
(France) A Boetsch	3	5	6^{9}

==== Section 6 ====
First round
13	(United States) B Gilbert	6	6	6
(France) J-P Fleurian	2	3	2
(Australia) S Youl	6	6	0
(Australia) R Fromberg	2	3	1^{r}
(Australia) W Masur	6	6	6
(Sweden) L Jönsson	2	2	1
(Netherlands) M Koevermans	2	1	3
Q	(The Bahamas) M Knowles	6	6	6
LL	(Australia) C Limberger	1	6	7	3	3
(Spain) C Costa	6	4	5	6	6
(Argentina) J Frana	3	6^{3}	4
(Sweden) M Larsson	6	7^{7}	6
(Germany) M Naewie	3	6^{4}	4
(Israel) A Mansdorf	6	7^{7}	6
(Italy) S Pescosolido	3	3	2
3	(Germany) M Stich	6	6	6

Second round
13	(United States) B Gilbert	6	7	7
(Australia) S Youl	1	5	5
(Australia) W Masur	6	6	7^{7}
Q	(The Bahamas) M Knowles	3	4	6^{3}
(Spain) C Costa	5	3	7^{7}	4
(Sweden) M Larsson	7	6	6^{5}	6
(Israel) A Mansdorf	6	6^{4}	3	3
3	(Germany) M Stich	4	7^{7}	6	6

Third round
13	(United States) B Gilbert	3	7^{7}	7^{7}	4	2
(Australia) W Masur	6	6^{2}	6^{5}	6	6
(Sweden) M Larsson	4	1	3
3	(Germany) M Stich	6	6	6

Fourth round
(Australia) W Masur	6	1	4	4
3	(Germany) M Stich	3	6	6	6

==== Section 7 ====
First round
8	(Croatia) G Ivanišević	6	6	6
(Germany) L Koslowski	2	2	3
(Australia) M Woodforde	6	6	3	7
(Netherlands) J Siemerink	3	2	6	5
WC	(United Kingdom) A Richardson	2	4	4
(Switzerland) M Rosset	6	6	6
WC	(United Kingdom) M Petchey	7^{7}	6	6^{5}	6
Q	(United States) D Randall	6^{1}	2	7^{7}	3
(Australia) S Stolle	7	7^{12}	0
(Czechoslovakia) K Nováček	5	6^{10}	0^{r}
WC	(United Kingdom) C Wilkinson	6	6	2	7^{7}
(Italy) G Pozzi	3	3	6	6^{4}
(United States) T Witsken	2	6	2	2
(Germany) A Thoms	6	2	6	6
(Germany) P Kühnen	1	6^{6}	6^{5}
10	(Czechoslovakia) I Lendl	6	7^{8}	7^{7}

Second round
8	(Croatia) G Ivanišević	6	6	6^{4}	6
(Australia) M Woodforde	4	4	7^{7}	3
(Switzerland) M Rosset	7^{7}	6	6
WC	(United Kingdom) M Petchey	6^{5}	2	3
(Australia) S Stolle	3	6	7^{15}	6
WC	(United Kingdom) C Wilkinson	6	4	6^{13}	4
(Germany) A Thoms	5	6^{6}	6	5
10	(Czechoslovakia) I Lendl	7	7^{8}	1	7

Third round
8	(Croatia) G Ivanišević	7^{7}	6	6
(Switzerland) M Rosset	6^{4}	4	4
(Australia) S Stolle	3	6	6	3	5
10	(Czechoslovakia) I Lendl	6	1	2	6	7

Fourth round
8	(Croatia) G Ivanišević	6^{7}	6	6	1
10	(Czechoslovakia) I Lendl	7^{9}	1	4	0^{r}

==== Section 8 ====
First round
15	(Commonwealth of Independent States) A Volkov	6	6	4	6
(Spain) E Sánchez	3	2	6	2
Q	(Czechoslovakia) B Stankovič	6	6	6
WC	(United Kingdom) A Foster	2	4	3
(Spain) G López	0	0	1
(Sweden) N Kulti	6	6	6
Q	(Sweden) H Holm	6	6	2	6
Q	(Australia) G Doyle	3	2	6	4
(United States) F Montana	4	1	1
(United States) P McEnroe	6	6	6
(Austria) T Muster	3	3	6^{6}
LL	(South Africa) G Stafford	6	6	7^{8}
(South Africa) G Muller	6^{4}	6	7^{10}	6
LL	(South Africa) M Ondruska	7^{7}	3	6^{8}	3
Q	(United States) S Bryan	1	3	0
2	(Sweden) S Edberg	6	6	6

Second round
15	(Commonwealth of Independent States) A Volkov	6	7	6
Q	(Czechoslovakia) B Stankovič	4	5	3
(Sweden) N Kulti	1	2	2
Q	(Sweden) H Holm	6	6	6
(United States) P McEnroe	4	6^{3}	6	2
LL	(South Africa) G Stafford	6	7^{7}	2	6
(South Africa) G Muller	6^{3}	3	6^{4}
2	(Sweden) S Edberg	7^{7}	6	7^{7}

Third round
15	(Commonwealth of Independent States) A Volkov	4	6	3	6^{8}
Q	(Sweden) H Holm	6	3	6	7^{10}
LL	(South Africa) G Stafford	1	0	2
2	(Sweden) S Edberg	6	6	6

Fourth round
Q	(Sweden) H Holm	3	4	7^{7}	3
2	(Sweden) S Edberg	6	6	6^{1}	6

== Notes ==
Preceded by 1992 French Open – Men's singles	Grand Slam men's singles	Succeeded by 1992 US Open – Men's singles
