= 1992 Wimbledon Championships – Girls' singles =

Girls' singles
- 1992 Wimbledon Championships

Final
- Champion: (United States) Chanda Rubin
- Runner-up: (Belgium) Laurence Courtois
- Score: 6–2, 7–5

Events
Singles	men	women		boys	girls
Doubles	men	women	mixed	boys	girls
WC Singles	men	women	quad
WC Doubles	men	women	quad
Legends	men	women	seniors
← 1991 ·	Wimbledon Championships	· 1993 →

Chanda Rubin defeated Laurence Courtois in the final, 6–2, 7–5 to win the girls' singles tennis title at the 1992 Wimbledon Championships.

== Seeds ==
1. (Germany) Meike Babel (third round)
2. (United States) Chanda Rubin (champion)
3. (United States) Lindsay Davenport (second round)
4. (United States) Pam Nelson (second round)
5. (Israel) Anna Smashnova (quarterfinals)
6. (Paraguay) Rossana de los Ríos (semifinals)
7. (Belgium) Nancy Feber (third round)
8. (Japan) Ai Sugiyama (quarterfinals)
9. (Romania) Cătălina Cristea (third round)
10. (Kazakhstan) Elena Likhovtseva (quarterfinals)
11. (Venezuela) Ninfa Marra (first round)
12. (Czechoslovakia) Ludmila Richterová (first round)
13. (Paraguay) Larissa Schaerer (third round)
14. (Japan) Mami Donoshiro (third round)
15. (United States) Annie Miller (second round)
16. (United States) Julie Steven (third round)

Click on the seed number of a player to go to their draw section.

== Draw ==
=== Key ===
- Q = Qualifier
- WC = Wild card
- LL = Lucky loser
- Alt = Alternate
- SE = Special exempt
- PR = Protected ranking
- ITF = ITF entry
- JE = Junior exempt
- w/o = Walkover
- r = Retired
- d = Defaulted
- SR = Special ranking

=== Finals ===
Quarterfinals
(Belgium) Laurence Courtois	7^{8}	6
8	(Japan) Ai Sugiyama	6^{6}	3
(Australia) Lisa McShea	4	4
6	(Paraguay) Rossana de los Ríos	6	6
5	(Israel) Anna Smashnova	6	4	2
(Germany) Andrea Glass	3	6	6
10	(Kazakhstan) Elena Likhovtseva	4	4
2	(United States) Chanda Rubin	6	6

Semifinals
(Belgium) Laurence Courtois	7^{7}	4	6
6	(Paraguay) Rossana de los Ríos	6^{4}	6	4
(Germany) Andrea Glass	1	7^{7}	6
2	(United States) Chanda Rubin	6	6^{5}	8

Final
(Belgium) Laurence Courtois	2	5
2	(United States) Chanda Rubin	6	7

=== Top half ===
==== Section 1 ====
First round
1	(Germany) Meike Babel	6	6
(Paraguay) Magalí Benítez	1	2
(Hungary) Kate Györke	2	6	6
(United Kingdom) Tamsin Wainwright	6	3	3
(Belgium) Laurence Courtois	6	6
(Thailand) Suvimol Duangchan	1	3
(South Korea) Choi Ju-yeon	1	1
15	(United States) Annie Miller	6	6
9	(Romania) Cătălina Cristea	6	6
(Switzerland) Susanne Locher	2	4
(United Kingdom) Amanda Wainwright	6^{4}	2
(Czechoslovakia) Zuzana Nemšáková	7^{7}	6
(Uruguay) Maria Olave	0	1
(United Kingdom) Lizzie Jelfs	6	6
(Israel) Shiri Burstein	7^{9}	3	0
8	(Japan) Ai Sugiyama	6^{7}	6	6

Second round
1	(Germany) M Babel	6	6
(Hungary) K Györke	0	0
(Belgium) L Courtois	6	6
15	(United States) A Miller	2	0
9	(Romania) C Cristea	6	6
(Czechoslovakia) Z Nemšáková	4	0
(United Kingdom) E Jelfs	6	4	6
8	(Japan) A Sugiyama	2	6	8

Third round
1	(Germany) M Babel	4	6^{2}
(Belgium) L Courtois	6	7^{7}
9	(Romania) C Cristea	4	6	1
8	(Japan) A Sugiyama	6	0	6

Quarterfinals
(Belgium) L Courtois	7^{8}	6
8	(Japan) A Sugiyama	6^{6}	3

==== Section 2 ====
First round
4	(United States) Pam Nelson	6	6
(France) Cécile Dorey	4	3
(Madagascar) Dally Randriantefy	2	6^{2}
(Australia) Lisa McShea	6	7^{7}
(Indonesia) Mimma Chernovita	6	6
(United Kingdom) Lorna Woodroffe	1	4
(South Africa) Estelle Gevers	3	5
14	(Japan) Mami Donoshiro	6	7
11	(Venezuela) Ninfa Marra	6	2	5
(Japan) Hiroko Mochizuki	3	6	6
(India) Aradhana Reddy	4	6^{3}
(Spain) Ana Laso	6	7^{7}
(Thailand) Benjamas Sangaram	3	1
(United Kingdom) Julie Pullin	6	6
(Argentina) María Landa	7	1	6
6	(Paraguay) Rossana de los Ríos	5	6	8

Second round
4	(United States) P Nelson	1	4
(Australia) L McShea	6	6
(Indonesia) M Chernovita	1	2
14	(Japan) M Donoshiro	6	6
(Japan) H Mochizuki	6	6
(Spain) A Laso	3	3
(United Kingdom) J Pullin	5	1
6	(Paraguay) R de los Ríos	7	6

Third round
(Australia) L McShea	6	2	6
14	(Japan) M Donoshiro	4	6	3
(Japan) H Mochizuki	2	6	4
6	(Paraguay) R de los Ríos	6	3	6

Quarterfinals
(Australia) L McShea	4	4
6	(Paraguay) R de los Ríos	6	6

=== Bottom half ===
==== Section 3 ====
First round
5	(Israel) Anna Smashnova	6	6
(Republic of Ireland) Catriona McCarthy	1	1
(Philippines) Francesca La'O	3	6^{4}
(Japan) Kazue Takuma	6	7^{7}
(Finland) Linda Jansson	1	2
(United Kingdom) Shirli-Ann Siddall	6	6
(Thailand) Sirilux Mingmolee	6	6
12	(Czechoslovakia) Ludmila Richterová	2	3
13	(Paraguay) Larissa Schaerer	6	6
(Mexico) Yolanda Rodríguez	3	4
(India) Natasha Joshi	4	2
(South Africa) Liezel Horn	6	6
(Germany) Andrea Glass	7	6
(United Kingdom) Sara Tse	5	2
(Japan) Yuka Tanaka	2	6^{3}
3	(United States) Lindsay Davenport	6	7^{7}

Second round
5	(Israel) A Smashnova	6	6
(Japan) K Takuma	1	0
(United Kingdom) S-A Siddall	6	6
(Thailand) S Mingmolee	1	1
13	(Paraguay) L Schaerer	7^{7}	6
(South Africa) L Horn	6^{1}	5
(Germany) A Glass	6	6
3	(United States) L Davenport	4	2

Third round
5	(Israel) A Smashnova	6	6
(United Kingdom) S-A Siddall	3	0
13	(Paraguay) L Schaerer	3	2
(Germany) A Glass	6	6

Quarterfinals
5	(Israel) A Smashnova	6	4	2
(Germany) A Glass	3	6	6

==== Section 4 ====
First round
7	(Belgium) Nancy Feber	6	6
(Thailand) Tamarine Tanasugarn	0	2
(Indonesia) Diana Sutedja	1	3
(Australia) Maija Avotins	6	6
(Mozambique) Laura Nhavene	6	4	7
(United Kingdom) Lucie Ahl	4	6	5
(Italy) Rita Grande	2	3
10	(Kazakhstan) Elena Likhovtseva	6	6
16	(United States) Julie Steven	6	6
(Thailand) Sudsobhi Chatsuthiphan	0	1
(Croatia) Maja Murić	0	3
(Paraguay) Viviana Valdovinos	6	6
(United Kingdom) Karen Cross	4	2
(Canada) Sonya Jeyaseelan	6	6
(Colombia) Giana Gutiérrez	3	1
2	(United States) Chanda Rubin	6	6

Second round
7	(Belgium) N Feber	6	6
(Australia) M Avotins	2	1
(Mozambique) L Nhavene	6^{5}	2
10	(Kazakhstan) E Likhovtseva	7^{7}	6
16	(United States) J Steven	6	6
(Paraguay) V Valdovinos	1	1
(Canada) S Jeyaseelan	1	3
2	(United States) C Rubin	6	6

Third round
7	(Belgium) N Feber	2	6	6
10	(Kazakhstan) E Likhovtseva	6	4	8
16	(United States) J Steven	1	2
2	(United States) C Rubin	6	6

Quarterfinals
10	(Kazakhstan) E Likhovtseva	4	4
2	(United States) C Rubin	6	6
