= 1992 Wimbledon Championships – Girls' doubles =

Girls' doubles
- 1992 Wimbledon Championships

Final
- Champions: (Australia) Maija Avotins (Australia) Lisa McShea
- Runners-up: (United States) Pam Nelson (United States) Julie Steven
- Score: 2–6, 6–4, 6–3

Events
Singles	men	women		boys	girls
Doubles	men	women	mixed	boys	girls
WC Singles	men	women	quad
WC Doubles	men	women	quad
Legends	men	women	seniors
← 1991 ·	Wimbledon Championships	· 1993 →

Maija Avotins and Lisa McShea defeated Pam Nelson and Julie Steven in the final, 2–6, 6–4, 6–3 to win the girls' doubles tennis title at the 1992 Wimbledon Championships.

== Seeds ==
1. (Belgium) Laurence Courtois / (Belgium) Nancy Feber (semifinals)
2. (United States) Lindsay Davenport / (United States) Chanda Rubin (first round, withdrew)
3. (Czechoslovakia) Zuzana Nemšáková / (Czechoslovakia) Ludmila Richterová (second round)
4. (Australia) Maija Avotins / (Australia) Lisa McShea (champions)
5. (Argentina) María Landa / (Venezuela) Ninfa Marra (quarterfinals)
6. (Japan) Mami Donoshiro / (Japan) Ai Sugiyama (second round, withdrew)
7. (United States) Pam Nelson / (United States) Julie Steven (final)
8. (Paraguay) Rossana de los Ríos / (Paraguay) Larissa Schaerer (second round)

== Draw ==
=== Key ===
- Q = Qualifier
- WC = Wild card
- LL = Lucky loser
- Alt = Alternate
- SE = Special exempt
- PR = Protected ranking
- ITF = ITF entry
- JE = Junior exempt
- w/o = Walkover
- r = Retired
- d = Defaulted
- SR = Special ranking

=== Finals ===
Semifinals
1	(Belgium) Laurence Courtois (Belgium) Nancy Feber	6	4	9
7	(United States) Pam Nelson (United States) Julie Steven	3	6	11
4	(Australia) Maija Avotins (Australia) Lisa McShea	6	6
(South Africa) Estelle Gevers (South Africa) Liezel Horn	0	4

Final
7	(United States) Pam Nelson (United States) Julie Steven	6	4	3
4	(Australia) Maija Avotins (Australia) Lisa McShea	2	6	6

=== Top half ===
First round
1	(Belgium) Laurence Courtois (Belgium) Nancy Feber	6	6
(Indonesia) Mimma Chernovita (Philippines) Francesca La'O	2	1
(Canada) Sonya Jeyaseelan (Kazakhstan) Elena Likhovtseva	6	4	6
(Romania) Cătălina Cristea (United Kingdom) Sara Tse	3	6	3
(Finland) Linda Jansson (Croatia) Maja Murić	6	6
(Thailand) Sudsobhi Chatsuthiphan (Thailand) Tamarine Tanasugarn	2	2
(United Kingdom) Frances Hearn (United Kingdom) Zoe Mellis	1	4
5	(Argentina) María Landa (Venezuela) Ninfa Marra	6	6
3	(Czechoslovakia) Zuzana Nemšáková (Czechoslovakia) Ludmila Richterová	6	6
(United Kingdom) Lucie Ahl (United Kingdom) Shirli-Ann Siddall	3	2
(Japan) Hiroko Mochizuki (Japan) Yuka Tanaka	3	6	6
(Germany) Andrea Glass (Israel) Anna Smashnova	6	2	1
(Thailand) Sirilux Mingmolee (Indonesia) Diana Sutedja	0	3
(United Kingdom) Mair Hughes (United Kingdom) Amanda Wainwright	6	6
(India) Natasha Joshi (India) Aradhana Reddy	4	2
7	(United States) Pam Nelson (United States) Julie Steven	6	6

Second round
1	(Belgium) L Courtois (Belgium) N Feber
(Canada) S Jeyaseelan (Kazakhstan) E Likhovtseva	w/o
(Finland) L Jansson (Croatia) M Murić	w/o
5	(Argentina) M Landa (Venezuela) N Marra
3	(Czechoslovakia) Z Nemšáková (Czechoslovakia) L Richterová	6^{4}	5
(Japan) H Mochizuki (Japan) Y Tanaka	7^{7}	7
(United Kingdom) M Hughes (United Kingdom) A Wainwright	3	0
7	(United States) P Nelson (United States) J Steven	6	6

Quarterfinals
1	(Belgium) L Courtois (Belgium) N Feber	6	6
5	(Argentina) M Landa (Venezuela) N Marra	1	3
(Japan) H Mochizuki (Japan) Y Tanaka	4	1
7	(United States) P Nelson (United States) J Steven	6	6

Semifinals
1	(Belgium) L Courtois (Belgium) N Feber	6	4	9
7	(United States) P Nelson (United States) J Steven	3	6	11

=== Bottom half ===
First round
8	(Paraguay) Rossana de los Ríos (Paraguay) Larissa Schaerer	5	6	6
(Mozambique) Laura Nhavene (Mexico) Yolanda Rodríguez	7	2	3
(United Kingdom) Julie Pullin (United Kingdom) Lorna Woodroffe	2	7^{7}	6
(South Korea) Choi Ju-yeon (Japan) Kazue Takuma	6	6^{3}	1
(Thailand) Suvimol Duangchan (Thailand) Benjamas Sangaram	6	6
(Republic of Ireland) Catriona McCarthy (Paraguay) Viviana Valdovinos	2	3
(Colombia) Giana Gutiérrez (United Kingdom) Megan Miller	2	0
4	(Australia) Maija Avotins (Australia) Lisa McShea	6	6
6	(Japan) Mami Donoshiro (Japan) Ai Sugiyama	7	6
(United Kingdom) Karen Cross (United Kingdom) Tamsin Wainwright	5	3
(France) Cécile Dorey (Madagascar) Dally Randriantefy	6	1	6
(Paraguay) Magalí Benítez (Uruguay) Maria Olave	3	6	4
(United Kingdom) Lizzie Jelfs (United Kingdom) Claire Taylor	6	6
(Israel) Shiri Burstein (Switzerland) Susanne Locher	2	3
(South Africa) Estelle Gevers (South Africa) Liezel Horn
2	(United States) Lindsay Davenport (United States) Chanda Rubin	w/o

Second round
8	(Paraguay) R de los Ríos (Paraguay) L Schaerer	5	6	5
(United Kingdom) J Pullin (United Kingdom) L Woodroffe	7	4	7
(Thailand) S Duangchan (Thailand) B Sangaram	4	3
4	(Australia) M Avotins (Australia) L McShea	6	6
6	(Japan) M Donoshiro (Japan) A Sugiyama	w/o
(France) C Dorey (Madagascar) D Randriantefy
(United Kingdom) E Jelfs (United Kingdom) C Taylor	6	3	4
(South Africa) E Gevers (South Africa) L Horn	2	6	6

Quarterfinals
(United Kingdom) J Pullin (United Kingdom) L Woodroffe	6	1	2
4	(Australia) M Avotins (Australia) L McShea	4	6	6
(France) C Dorey (Madagascar) D Randriantefy	3	6	0
(South Africa) E Gevers (South Africa) L Horn	6	3	6

Semifinals
4	(Australia) M Avotins (Australia) L McShea	6	6
(South Africa) Estelle Gevers (South Africa) Liezel Horn	0	4
