= Nitin Kirtane =

Indian tennis player

- Country (sports): India
- Born: 4 March 1974 (age 52) Maharashtra, India
- Height: 1.72 m (5 ft 7 1/2 in)
- Turned pro: 1989
- Plays: Left-handed
- College: Brihan Maharashtra College of Commerce
- Prize money: $20, 736

Singles
- Career record: 0–0
- Career titles: 0; 0 Challenger, 0 Futures
- Highest ranking: No. 540 (24 February 2003)

Doubles
- Career record: 1–3
- Career titles: 0; 0 Challenger, 0 Futures
- Highest ranking: No. 280 (25 October 1999)
- Last updated on: 21 May 2022.

Nitin Kirtane (born 4 March 1974) is an Indian professional tennis player. Kirtane won the gold medal at the 2002 National Games of India and along with Mahesh Bhupathi was the runner-up at the 1992 boys Wimbledon Championship.

== Junior Grand Slam finals ==
=== Doubles: 1 (1 runner-up) ===
Result	Year	Tournament	Surface	Partner	Opponents	Score
Loss	1992	Wimbledon	Grass	(India) Mahesh Bhupathi	(Australia) Scott Draper (Australia) Steven Baldas	1–6, 6–4, 7–9

== ATP Challenger and ITF Futures finals ==
=== Singles: 1 (0–1) ===
Legend ATP Challenger (0–0) ITF Futures (0–1)	Finals by surface Hard (0–1) Clay (0–0) Grass (0–0) Carpet (0–0)

Result	W–L	Date	Tournament	Tier	Surface	Opponent	Score
Loss	0–1	Nov 2082	India F8, Davanagere	Futures	Hard	(India) Harsh Mankad	1–6, 6–7^{(1–7)}

=== Doubles: 6 (0–6) ===
Legend ATP Challenger (0–0) ITF Futures (0–6)	Finals by surface Hard (0–2) Clay (0–3) Grass (0–1) Carpet (0–0)

Result	W–L	Date	Tournament	Tier	Surface	Partner	Opponents	Score
Loss	0–1	May 1998	USA F2, Vero Beach	Futures	Clay	(Australia) Ashley Fisher	(Sweden) Simon Aspelin (United States) Chris Tontz	3–6, 4–6
Loss	0–2	Aug 1999	Egypt F1, Cairo	Futures	Clay	(India) Sandeep Kirtane	(Australia) Darin Currall (Australia) Glenn Knox	7–6, 2–6, 5–7
Loss	0–3	Nov 2000	India F4, Lucknow	Futures	Grass	(India) Vishal Uppal	(France) Leslie Demiliani (Italy) Dario Pizzato	2–6, 4–6
Loss	0–4	Oct 2001	India F5, Indore	Futures	Clay	(India) Sunil-Kumar Sipaeya	(India) Srinath Prahlad (India) Ajay Ramaswami	3–6, 0–6
Loss	0–5	Sep 2002	India F5, Chennai	Futures	Hard	(India) Saurav Panja	(India) Rohan Bopanna (India) Vijay Kannan	2–6, 3–6
Loss	0–6	Nov 2002	India F7, New Delhi	Futures	Hard	(India) Saurav Panja	(India) Vishal Uppal (India) Vijay Kannan	2–6, 4–6
