= Viviana Valdovinos =

Paraguayan tennis player

- Country (sports): Paraguay
- Born: 8 February 1974 (age 51)
- Prize money: $8,347

Singles
- Career record: 0–2 (Fed Cup)
- Highest ranking: No. 396 (22 June 1992)

Doubles
- Career record: 1–1 (Fed Cup)
- Career titles: 2 ITF
- Highest ranking: No. 323 (22 July 1991)

Viviana Valdovinos (born 8 February 1974) is a Paraguayan former professional tennis player.

Valdovinos, a native of Asunción, had some good results in junior tennis while training under the guidance of Víctor Pecci. She featured in grand slam tournaments including Wimbledon and was a runner-up at the top-tier Astrid Bowl tournament in 1992, losing to countrywoman Larissa Schaerer in the final.

On the professional tour, Valdovinos reached a best singles world ranking of 396 and won two ITF circuit events in doubles. She represented the Paraguay Fed Cup team in both 1992 and 1996, playing in a total of four rubbers. In 1992 she was used only in doubles, as the partner of Rossana de los Ríos, with the pair winning one of their two rubbers. When she returned in 1996 it was as a singles player and she was beaten in both of her appearances.

== ITF finals ==
=== Doubles: 3 (2–1) ===
Result	No.	Date	Tournament	Surface	Partner	Opponents	Score
Win	1.	Nov 1990	ITF Asunción, Paraguay	Clay	(United States) Jolene Watanabe	(Argentina) María José Gaidano (Uruguay) Patricia Miller	3–6, 6–4, 7–6
Loss	1.	May 1991	ITF Francavilla, Italy	Clay	(United States) Jolene Watanabe	(Italy) Marzia Grossi (Italy) Caterina Nozzoli	1–6, 3–6
Win	2.	Oct 1995	ITF Asunción, Paraguay	Clay	(Paraguay) Larissa Schaerer	(Brazil) Renata Brito (Argentina) Carina Lopez	3–6, 6–2, 6–4
