= 1992 Wimbledon Championships – Women's singles =

Women's singles
- 1992 Wimbledon Championships

Final
- Champion: (Germany) Steffi Graf
- Runner-up: (Federal Republic of Yugoslavia) Monica Seles
- Score: 6–2, 6–1

Details
- Draw: 128 (8 Q / 8 WC )
- Seeds: 16

Events
Singles	men	women		boys	girls
Doubles	men	women	mixed	boys	girls
WC Singles	men	women	quad
WC Doubles	men	women	quad
Legends	men	women	seniors
← 1991 ·	Wimbledon Championships	· 1993 →

Defending champion Steffi Graf defeated Monica Seles in the final, 6–2, 6–1 to win the ladies' singles tennis title at the 1992 Wimbledon Championships. It was her fourth Wimbledon singles title and eleventh major singles title overall. Seles was attempting to complete a non-calendar year Grand Slam and the career Grand Slam, having won the preceding US Open, Australian Open, and French Open. The final was the only match Seles lost at the majors in 1992, as she went on to win the 1992 US Open. It was her career-best finish at Wimbledon.

== Seeds ==
1. (Federal Republic of Yugoslavia) Monica Seles (final)
2. (Germany) Steffi Graf (champion)
3. (Argentina) Gabriela Sabatini (semifinals)
4. (United States) Martina Navratilova (semifinals)
5. (Spain) Arantxa Sánchez Vicario (second round)
6. (United States) Jennifer Capriati (quarterfinals)
7. (United States) Mary Joe Fernández (third round)
8. (Spain) Conchita Martínez (second round)

9. (Switzerland) Manuela Maleeva-Fragnière (third round)
10. (Germany) Anke Huber (third round)
11. (Czechoslovakia) Jana Novotná (third round)
12. (Bulgaria) Katerina Maleeva (quarterfinals)
13. (United States) Zina Garrison (fourth round)
14. (France) Nathalie Tauziat (quarterfinals)
15. (Japan) Kimiko Date (second round)
16. (Austria) Judith Wiesner (third round)

Click on the seed number of a player to go to their draw section.

== Draw ==
=== Key ===
- Q = Qualifier
- WC = Wild card
- LL = Lucky loser
- Alt = Alternate
- ITF = ITF entry
- PR = Protected ranking
- SR = Special ranking
- SE = Special exempt
- JE = Junior exempt
- JR = Junior Accelerator Programme entrant
- CO = College Accelerator Programme entrant
- NG = Next Gen Accelerator Program entrant
- w/o = Walkover
- r = Retired
- d = Defaulted

=== Finals ===
Quarterfinals
1	(Federal Republic of Yugoslavia) Monica Seles	6	6
14	(France) Nathalie Tauziat	1	3
4	(United States) Martina Navratilova	6	7^{7}
12	(Bulgaria) Katerina Maleeva	3	6^{2}
6	(United States) Jennifer Capriati	1	6	3
3	(Argentina) Gabriela Sabatini	6	3	6
(Commonwealth of Independent States) Natasha Zvereva	3	1
2	(Germany) Steffi Graf	6	6

Semifinals
1	(Federal Republic of Yugoslavia) Monica Seles	6	6^{3}	6
4	(United States) Martina Navratilova	2	7^{7}	4
3	(Argentina) Gabriela Sabatini	3	3
2	(Germany) Steffi Graf	6	6

Final
1	(Federal Republic of Yugoslavia) Monica Seles	2	1
2	(Germany) Steffi Graf	6	6

=== Top half ===
==== Section 1 ====
First round
1	(Federal Republic of Yugoslavia) M Seles	6	6
(Australia) J Byrne	2	2
(Germany) M Babel	0	2
(Belgium) S Appelmans	6	6
(United States) B Bowes	0	2
(Peru) L Gildemeister	6	6
(United States) G Helgeson	6	6
(China) F Li	1	2
(Latvia) L Neiland	0	3
(Germany) C Porwik	6	6
WC	(United Kingdom) S-A Siddall	2	6	6
WC	(United Kingdom) V Lake	6	4	3
(United States) D Faber	4	6	3
(United States) G Fernández	6	4	6
(United States) C Kuhlman	6^{2}	2
15	(Japan) K Date	7^{7}	6

Second round
1	(Federal Republic of Yugoslavia) M Seles	6	6
(Belgium) S Appelmans	3	2
(Peru) L Gildemeister	3	6	7
(United States) G Helgeson	6	4	5
(Germany) C Porwik	6	6
WC	(United Kingdom) S-A Siddall	4	2
(United States) G Fernández	6	6
15	(Japan) K Date	1	3

Third round
1	(Federal Republic of Yugoslavia) M Seles	6	6
(Peru) L Gildemeister	4	1
(Germany) C Porwik	2	0
(United States) G Fernández	6	6

Fourth round
1	(Federal Republic of Yugoslavia) M Seles	6	6
(United States) G Fernández	4	2

==== Section 2 ====
First round
14	(France) N Tauziat	6	6
(Netherlands) B Schultz	4	0
WC	(United Kingdom) C Wood	3	3
(Commonwealth of Independent States) N Medvedeva	6	6
(Australia) N Provis	6	6
(Germany) W Probst	0	3
(Czechoslovakia) R Zrubáková	6	6
(Germany) K Oeljeklaus	1	1
(United States) L Allen	3	6	7
(United Kingdom) S Gomer	6	1	5
(United States) A Frazier	6	6
(Italy) L Golarsa	2	1
(Finland) N Dahlman	7^{10}	6
(Commonwealth of Independent States) E Maniokova	6^{8}	4
WC	(United Kingdom) S Bentley	1	0
7	(United States) MJ Fernández	6	6

Second round
14	(France) N Tauziat	7	2	6
(Commonwealth of Independent States) N Medvedeva	5	6	3
(Australia) N Provis	6	6
(Czechoslovakia) R Zrubáková	2	4
(United States) L Allen	6^{3}	1
(United States) A Frazier	7^{7}	6
(Finland) N Dahlman	5	2
7	(United States) MJ Fernández	7	6

Third round
14	(France) N Tauziat	4	7	6
(Australia) N Provis	6	5	3
(United States) A Frazier	6	6
7	(United States) MJ Fernández	3	3

Fourth round
14	(France) N Tauziat	6	6
(United States) A Frazier	0	3

==== Section 3 ====
First round
4	(United States) M Navratilova	6	6
(Bulgaria) Mag Maleeva	2	2
(United States) K Po	6	6
(Canada) R Simpson-Alter	4	3
(Germany) S Frankl	6	6
(Czechoslovakia) E Švíglerová	2	0
(Germany) B Rittner	6	6
(United States) T Whitlinger	4	1
(Argentina) F Labat	2	2
(Indonesia) Y Basuki	6	6
(Germany) S Hack	6	1	12
(France) P Paradis-Mangon	3	6	10
(France) S Testud	6	3	4
Q	(Argentina) C Tessi	4	6	6
(Italy) L Ferrando	4	4
10	(Germany) A Huber	6	6

Second round
4	(United States) M Navratilova	6	3	6
(United States) K Po	2	6	0
(Germany) S Frankl	0	0
(Germany) B Rittner	6	6
(Indonesia) Y Basuki	7	6
(Germany) S Hack	5	3
Q	(Argentina) C Tessi	2	2
10	(Germany) A Huber	6	6

Third round
4	(United States) M Navratilova	7	6
(Germany) B Rittner	5	1
(Indonesia) Y Basuki	6	6
10	(Germany) A Huber	2	3

Fourth round
4	(United States) M Navratilova	7	6
(Indonesia) Y Basuki	5	2

==== Section 4 ====
First round
12	(Bulgaria) K Maleeva	6	6
WC	(United Kingdom) C Hall	2	2
(Netherlands) M Bollegraf	6	6
Q	(Netherlands) C Wegink	1	2
WC	(United Kingdom) A Grunfeld	4	6	6
(Germany) S Meier	6	2	4
(Argentina) B Fulco-Villella	1	2
(Japan) M Endo	6	6
LL	(Australia) J-A Faull	6	1	5
(Czechoslovakia) H Suková	3	6	7
WC	(United Kingdom) S Loosemore	1	6	4
(France) A Dechaume	6	4	6
(Czechoslovakia) R Rajchrtová	3	1
(France) J Halard	6	6
(Commonwealth of Independent States) L Meskhi	3	6^{3}
5	(Spain) A Sánchez Vicario	6	7^{7}

Second round
12	(Bulgaria) K Maleeva	6	6
(Netherlands) M Bollegraf	4	1
WC	(United Kingdom) A Grunfeld	7	2	5
(Japan) M Endo	5	6	7
(Czechoslovakia) H Suková	7	6
(France) A Dechaume	5	2
(France) J Halard	6	2	6
5	(Spain) A Sánchez Vicario	3	6	3

Third round
12	(Bulgaria) K Maleeva	7	6
(Japan) M Endo	5	3
(Czechoslovakia) H Suková	6	1	3
(France) J Halard	4	6	6

Fourth round
12	(Bulgaria) K Maleeva	6	6
(France) J Halard	0	3

=== Bottom half ===
==== Section 5 ====
First round
6	(United States) J Capriati	6	7
(United States) C Rubin	0	5
(Commonwealth of Independent States) E Brioukhovets	6	3	1
(United States) P Shriver	1	6	6
(South Africa) E Reinach	4	2
(Canada) P Hy	6	6
Q	(United States) J Santrock	3	6^{5}
(Finland) P Thorén	6	7^{7}
(Czechoslovakia) A Strnadová	6	6
Q	(Australia) L Field	2	2
(France) C Tanvier	2	5
(Japan) N Sawamatsu	6	7
(Poland) K Nowak	6	6
WC	(United Kingdom) V Humphreys-Davies	3	0
(Japan) M Kidowaki	2	2
16	(Austria) J Wiesner	6	6

Second round
6	(United States) J Capriati	6	6
(United States) P Shriver	2	4
(Canada) P Hy	6	6^{5}	6
(Finland) P Thorén	2	7^{7}	1
(Czechoslovakia) A Strnadová	3	6^{7}
(Japan) N Sawamatsu	6	7^{9}
(Poland) K Nowak	0	1
16	(Austria) J Wiesner	6	6

Third round
6	(United States) J Capriati	6	6
(Canada) P Hy	3	1
(Japan) N Sawamatsu	6	7
16	(Austria) J Wiesner	1	5

Fourth round
6	(United States) J Capriati	6	4	6
(Japan) N Sawamatsu	3	6	4

==== Section 6 ====
First round
9	(Switzerland) Man Maleeva-Fragnière	6	6
(Netherlands) N Muns-Jagerman	1	4
Q	(Belgium) A Devries	2	6^{4}
(United States) K Rinaldi	6	7^{7}
(Germany) C Kohde-Kilsch	2	6	6
(Australia) R McQuillan	6	2	4
Q	(Netherlands) M Oremans	3	3
(Australia) K Godridge	6	6
Q	(Japan) R Hiraki	6	6
Q	(Germany) K Kschwendt	0	3
(France) S Niox-Château	1	6	5
LL	(United States) T Whittington	6	4	7
(France) I Demongeot	6	6
(United States) R White	2	3
(Switzerland) C Fauche	1	1
3	(Argentina) G Sabatini	6	6

Second round
9	(Switzerland) Man Maleeva-Fragnière	4	6	6
(United States) K Rinaldi	6	3	4
(Germany) C Kohde-Kilsch	4	5
(Australia) K Godridge	6	7
Q	(Japan) R Hiraki	6	7
LL	(United States) T Whittington	1	5
(France) I Demongeot	2	3
3	(Argentina) G Sabatini	6	6

Third round
9	(Switzerland) Man Maleeva-Fragnière	5	6^{2}
(Australia) K Godridge	7	7^{7}
Q	(Japan) R Hiraki	0	4
3	(Argentina) G Sabatini	6	6

Fourth round
(Australia) K Godridge	2	1
3	(Argentina) G Sabatini	6	6

==== Section 7 ====
First round
8	(Spain) C Martínez	6	6
(United States) M-L Daniels	1	0
(France) N Herreman	3	2
(Commonwealth of Independent States) N Zvereva	6	6
(Australia) R Stubbs	6	7
(Italy) N Baudone	2	5
(France) C Suire	1	5
(United States) L McNeil	6	7
(United States) K Adams	6	6
(Italy) S Farina	3	2
(Germany) V Martinek	6^{4}	1
(South Africa) R Fairbank-Nideffer	7^{7}	6
(United States) L Harvey-Wild	6	6
(United Kingdom) J Durie	4	2
(Italy) F Bonsignori	0	1
13	(United States) Z Garrison	6	6

Second round
8	(Spain) C Martínez	3	7	4
(Commonwealth of Independent States) N Zvereva	6	5	6
(Australia) R Stubbs	1	3
(United States) L McNeil	6	6
(United States) K Adams	3	4
(South Africa) R Fairbank-Nideffer	6	6
(United States) L Harvey-Wild	2	4
13	(United States) Z Garrison	6	6

Third round
(Commonwealth of Independent States) N Zvereva	5	6	7
(United States) L McNeil	7	4	5
(South Africa) R Fairbank-Nideffer	4	2
13	(United States) Z Garrison	6	6

Fourth round
(Commonwealth of Independent States) N Zvereva	6	3	6
13	(United States) Z Garrison	2	6	1

==== Section 8 ====
First round
11	(Czechoslovakia) J Novotná	6	6
(Belgium) D Monami	1	2
(Argentina) P Tarabini	2	4
(Sweden) C Lindqvist	6	6
(United States) P Fendick	6	6
(Czechoslovakia) K Habšudová	2	4
(United States) D Graham	6	7^{7}
(United States) C Cunningham	2	6^{4}
(South Africa) M de Swardt	6	6
(Italy) L Garrone	4	3
(Czechoslovakia) K Kroupová	3	4
(United States) A Keller	6	6
(United Kingdom) M Javer	2	6	0
(United States) M Werdel	6	4	6
(France) N van Lottum	1	0
2	(Germany) S Graf	6	6

Second round
11	(Czechoslovakia) J Novotná	6	6
(Sweden) C Lindqvist	3	2
(United States) P Fendick	7	7
(United States) D Graham	5	5
(South Africa) M de Swardt	6	5	7
(United States) A Keller	2	7	5
(United States) M Werdel	1	1
2	(Germany) S Graf	6	6

Third round
11	(Czechoslovakia) J Novotná	3	3
(United States) P Fendick	6	6
(South Africa) M de Swardt	7	0	5
2	(Germany) S Graf	5	6	7

Fourth round
(United States) P Fendick	6	3	2
2	(Germany) S Graf	4	6	6

Preceded by 1992 French Open – Women's singles	Grand Slam women's singles	Succeeded by 1992 US Open – Women's singles
