= 1992 Wimbledon Championships – Men's doubles =

Men's doubles
- 1992 Wimbledon Championships

Final
- Champions: (United States) John McEnroe (Germany) Michael Stich
- Runners-up: (United States) Jim Grabb (United States) Richey Reneberg
- Score: 5–7, 7–6^{(7–5)}, 3–6, 7–6^{(7–5)}, 19–17

Details
- Draw: 64 (5Q / 6WC)
- Seeds: 16

Events
Singles	men	women		boys	girls
Doubles	men	women	mixed	boys	girls
WC Singles	men	women	quad
WC Doubles	men	women	quad
Legends	men	women	seniors
- Wimbledon Championships

John McEnroe and Michael Stich defeated Jim Grabb and Richey Reneberg in the final, 5–7, 7–6^{(7–5)}, 3–6, 7–6^{(7–5)}, 19–17 to win the gentlemen's doubles title at the 1992 Wimbledon Championships.

John Fitzgerald and Anders Järryd were the defending champions, but lost in the second round to McEnroe and Stich. This was the second year in a row that an unseeded team featuring McEnroe defeated the defending champions.

The 1992 final featured two unheralded teams that defeated the number one and number two seeds in the draw respectively on their way to the final. Fitzgerald and Järryd, the defending champions and number one seeds, had featured in three of the past four finals, but lost in the second round to the unseeded duo of McEnroe and Stich. Todd Woodbridge and Mark Woodforde, the number two seeds who would go on to win the championship the next five years in a row, were ousted here in the semifinals by fourth-seeded Grabb and Reneberg.

== Seeds ==
1. (Australia) John Fitzgerald / (Sweden) Anders Järryd (second round)
2. (Australia) Todd Woodbridge / (Australia) Mark Woodforde (semifinals)
3. (United States) Kelly Jones / (United States) Rick Leach (third round)
4. (United States) Jim Grabb / (United States) Richey Reneberg (final)
5. (United States) Scott Davis / (United States) David Pate (quarterfinals)
6. (Canada) Grant Connell / (Canada) Glenn Michibata (second round)
7. (Netherlands) Tom Nijssen / (Czechoslovakia) Cyril Suk (first round)
8. (United States) Ken Flach / (United States) Todd Witsken (third round)
9. (Australia) Mark Kratzmann / (Australia) Wally Masur (quarterfinals)
10. (South Africa) Wayne Ferreira / (South Africa) Piet Norval (first round)
11. (United States) Steve DeVries / (Australia) David Macpherson (third round)
12. (United States) Luke Jensen / (Australia) Laurie Warder (third round)
13. (France) Guy Forget / (Switzerland) Jakob Hlasek (semifinals)
14. (Argentina) Javier Frana / (Mexico) Leonardo Lavalle (third round)
15. (United States) Kent Kinnear / (United States) Sven Salumaa (third round)
16. (Italy) Omar Camporese / (Croatia) Goran Ivanišević (first round)

Click on the seed number of a player to go to their draw section.

== Draw ==
Key

- Q = Qualifier
- WC = Wild card
- LL = Lucky loser
- Alt = Alternate
- ITF = ITF entry
- PR = Protected ranking
- SR = Special ranking
- SE = Special exempt
- JE = Junior exempt
- JR = Junior Accelerator Programme entrant
- CO = College Accelerator Programme entrant
- NG = Next Gen Accelerator Program entrant
- w/o = Walkover
- r = Retired
- d = Defaulted

=== Finals ===
Quarterfinals
(United States) John McEnroe (Germany) Michael Stich	6	6	6
(Netherlands) Paul Haarhuis (Netherlands) Mark Koevermans	3	4	4
13	(France) Guy Forget (Switzerland) Jakob Hlasek	4	7^{8}	6^{2}	7^{7}	6
5	(United States) Scott Davis (United States) David Pate	6	6^{6}	7^{7}	6^{4}	4
(United States) Patrick McEnroe (United States) Jonathan Stark	6^{3}	3	6	6^{5}
4	(United States) Jim Grabb (United States) Richey Reneberg	7^{7}	6	3	7^{7}
9	(Australia) Mark Kratzmann (Australia) Wally Masur	7^{7}	6^{5}	5	3
2	(Australia) Todd Woodbridge (Australia) Mark Woodforde	6^{5}	7^{7}	7	6

Semifinals
(United States) John McEnroe (Germany) Michael Stich	7^{7}	6	7^{7}
13	(France) Guy Forget (Switzerland) Jakob Hlasek	6^{4}	3	6^{4}
4	(United States) Jim Grabb (United States) Richey Reneberg	7^{7}	4	4	7^{7}	6
2	(Australia) Todd Woodbridge (Australia) Mark Woodforde	6^{3}	6	6	6^{4}	4

Final
(United States) John McEnroe (Germany) Michael Stich	5	7^{7}	3	7^{7}	19
4	(United States) Jim Grabb (United States) Richey Reneberg	7	6^{5}	6	6^{5}	17

=== Top half ===
==== Section 1 ====
First round
1	(Australia) J Fitzgerald (Sweden) A Järryd	6	7^{7}	6
(South Africa) P Aldrich (South Africa) D Visser	3	6^{4}	3
(Spain) T Carbonell (Czechoslovakia) D Rikl	2	2	3
(United States) J McEnroe (Germany) M Stich	6	6	6
(Czechoslovakia) V Flégl (Czechoslovakia) K Nováček	4	3	3
(Italy) G Pozzi (Finland) O Rahnasto	6	6	6
WC	(United Kingdom) C Bailey (United Kingdom) C Wilkinson	2	6	3	5
15	(United States) K Kinnear (United States) S Salumaa	6	3	6	7
10	(South Africa) W Ferreira (South Africa) P Norval	3	7^{8}	6	3	4
(Italy) D Nargiso (Switzerland) M Rosset	6	6^{6}	4	6	6
WC	(United Kingdom) A Castle (United Kingdom) M Maclagan	4	4	6
(Netherlands) P Haarhuis (Netherlands) M Koevermans	6	6	7
Q	(Sweden) H Holm (Sweden) P Nyborg	1	6	6	7^{7}
Q	(United States) M Bauer (United States) B Joelson	6	3	4	6^{4}
(Netherlands) HJ Davids (Belgium) L Pimek	5	6	6^{4}	6^{6}
8	(United States) K Flach (United States) T Witsken	7	3	7^{7}	7^{8}

Second round
1	(Australia) J Fitzgerald (Sweden) A Järryd	3	6^{3}	3
(United States) J McEnroe (Germany) M Stich	6	7^{7}	6
(Italy) G Pozzi (Finland) O Rahnasto	2	6^{6}	5
15	(United States) K Kinnear (United States) S Salumaa	6	7^{8}	7
(Italy) D Nargiso (Switzerland) M Rosset	7^{7}	4	6^{3}	5
(Netherlands) P Haarhuis (Netherlands) M Koevermans	6^{5}	6	7^{7}	7
Q	(Sweden) H Holm (Sweden) P Nyborg	2	4	7^{7}	5
8	(United States) K Flach (United States) T Witsken	6	6	6^{5}	7

Third round
(United States) J McEnroe (Germany) M Stich	6	6	6
15	(United States) K Kinnear (United States) S Salumaa	3	2	4
(Netherlands) P Haarhuis (Netherlands) M Koevermans	6	6	6
8	(United States) K Flach (United States) T Witsken	4	4	2

Quarterfinals
(United States) J McEnroe (Germany) M Stich	6	6	6
(Netherlands) P Haarhuis (Netherlands) M Koevermans	3	4	4

==== Section 2 ====
First round
3	(United States) K Jones (United States) R Leach	6	7^{7}	7
(United States) T Nelson (Australia) J Stoltenberg	4	6^{3}	5
(United States) P Galbraith (United States) J Palmer	3	6	7^{7}	7^{7}
(United States) P Annacone (United States) R Seguso	6	4	6^{2}	6^{5}
WC	(United Kingdom) J Bates (South Africa) C van Rensburg	6	6	3	7
(Czechoslovakia) M Damm (Australia) S Stolle	3	3	6	5
(Brazil) R Acioly (Zimbabwe) B Black	3	6^{2}	3
13	(France) G Forget (Switzerland) J Hlasek	6	7^{7}	6
11	(United States) S DeVries (Australia) D Macpherson	4	7^{7}	7^{7}	3	6
(Latvia) Ģ Dzelde (Kenya) P Wekesa	6	6^{2}	6^{5}	6	0
WC	(United Kingdom) N Brown (United Kingdom) A Richardson	6	6^{5}	6	6
(United States) M Briggs (United States) T Kronemann	4	7^{7}	4	3
(United States) M Keil (United States) D Randall	2	6	1	3
Q	(France) A Boetsch (France) G Raoux	6	3	6	6
(Spain) S Casal (United States) B Gilbert	3	7^{7}	3^{r}
5	(United States) S Davis (United States) D Pate	6	6^{5}	5

Second round
3	(United States) K Jones (United States) R Leach	3	7^{7}	6^{3}	6	6
(United States) P Galbraith (United States) J Palmer	6	6^{3}	7^{7}	4	3
WC	(United Kingdom) J Bates (South Africa) C van Rensburg	3	6	6^{5}	4
13	(France) G Forget (Switzerland) J Hlasek	6	3	7^{7}	6
11	(United States) S DeVries (Australia) D Macpherson	6	7^{7}	7^{9}
WC	(United Kingdom) N Brown (United Kingdom) A Richardson	1	6^{3}	6^{7}
Q	(France) A Boetsch (France) G Raoux	6^{5}	1	2
5	(United States) S Davis (United States) D Pate	7^{7}	6	6

Third round
3	(United States) K Jones (United States) R Leach	3	4	4
13	(France) G Forget (Switzerland) J Hlasek	6	6	6
11	(United States) S DeVries (Australia) D Macpherson	3	7^{7}	3	4
5	(United States) S Davis (United States) D Pate	6	6^{3}	6	6

Quarterfinals
13	(France) G Forget (Switzerland) J Hlasek	4	7^{8}	6^{2}	7^{7}	6
5	(United States) S Davis (United States) D Pate	6	6^{6}	7^{7}	6^{4}	4

=== Bottom half ===
==== Section 3 ====
First round
6	(Canada) G Connell (Canada) G Michibata	7	6	6
(United States) C Beckman (United States) J Brown	5	1	4
(United States) P McEnroe (United States) J Stark	6	6	6
(Australia) B Dyke (Sweden) P Lundgren	2	3	4
(Nigeria) N Odizor (Uruguay) D Pérez	5	3	2
(Sweden) R Båthman (Sweden) R Bergh	7	6	6
(United States) B Pearce (South Africa) B Talbot	4	6^{3}	3
12	(United States) L Jensen (Australia) L Warder	6	7^{7}	6
14	(Argentina) J Frana (Mexico) L Lavalle	6	7	5	3	6
(South Africa) D Adams (Commonwealth of Independent States) A Olhovskiy	3	5	7	6	3
(Netherlands) M Schapers (Czechoslovakia) D Vacek	7^{9}	7^{7}	6
WC	(United Kingdom) D Ison (United Kingdom) M Petchey	6^{7}	6^{3}	3
(Czechoslovakia) P Korda (United States) J Pugh	6	3	6	4	8
Q	(South Africa) J-L de Jager (South Africa) M Ondruska	2	6	3	6	10
(Commonwealth of Independent States) D Poliakov (Netherlands) J Siemerink	3	2	1
4	(United States) J Grabb (United States) R Reneberg	6	6	6

Second round
6	(Canada) G Connell (Canada) G Michibata	4	5	6^{3}
(United States) P McEnroe (United States) J Stark	6	7	7^{7}
(Sweden) R Båthman (Sweden) R Bergh	6	6	1	4	8
12	(United States) L Jensen (Australia) L Warder	3	4	6	6	10
14	(Argentina) J Frana (Mexico) L Lavalle	7^{7}	6^{5}	3	6	7
(Netherlands) M Schapers (Czechoslovakia) D Vacek	6^{4}	7^{7}	6	3	5
Q	(South Africa) J-L de Jager (South Africa) M Ondruska	2	6	5	4
4	(United States) J Grabb (United States) R Reneberg	6	4	7	6

Third round
(United States) P McEnroe (United States) J Stark	6	6	4	6
12	(United States) L Jensen (Australia) L Warder	2	4	6	4
14	(Argentina) J Frana (Mexico) L Lavalle	1	2	4
4	(United States) J Grabb (United States) R Reneberg	6	6	6

Quarterfinals
(United States) P McEnroe (United States) J Stark	6^{3}	3	6	6^{5}
4	(United States) J Grabb (United States) R Reneberg	7^{7}	6	3	7^{7}

==== Section 4 ====
First round
7	(Netherlands) T Nijssen (Czechoslovakia) C Suk	5	7^{7}	6^{0}	3
(United States) K Curren (South Africa) G Muller	7	6^{3}	7^{7}	6
(Netherlands) J Eltingh (Netherlands) T Kempers	4	3	6	7^{7}	6
(United States) B Garnett (Sweden) T Svantesson	6	6	4	6^{5}	4
(South Africa) S Kruger (United States) G Layendecker	7	6^{0}	3	6	6
(Australia) C Limberger (Netherlands) M Oosting	5	7^{7}	6	4	3
WC	(United Kingdom) A Foster (United Kingdom) D Sapsford	2	6	4	1
9	(Australia) M Kratzmann (Australia) W Masur	6	3	6	6
16	(Italy) O Camporese (Croatia) G Ivanišević	6^{4}	7^{7}	6^{5}	2
Q	(United States) D Eisenman (The Bahamas) M Knowles	7^{7}	6^{3}	7^{7}	6
(Australia) N Borwick (Australia) S Youl	6	6	7^{7}
(Sweden) O Jonsson (United States) T Scherman	1	4	6^{3}
(United States) S Cannon (United States) G Van Emburgh	6^{4}	6	3	6^{3}
(United Kingdom) N Broad (United States) B Shelton	7^{7}	3	6	7^{7}
(United States) F Montana (United States) K Thorne	6	2	2	2
2	(Australia) T Woodbridge (Australia) M Woodforde	1	6	6	6

Second round
(United States) K Curren (South Africa) G Muller	3	6	6^{4}	6^{5}
(Netherlands) J Eltingh (Netherlands) T Kempers	6	4	7^{7}	7^{7}
(South Africa) S Kruger (United States) G Layendecker	4	4	4
9	(Australia) M Kratzmann (Australia) W Masur	6	6	6
Q	(United States) D Eisenman (The Bahamas) M Knowles	6^{2}	3	3
(Australia) N Borwick (Australia) S Youl	7^{7}	6	6
(United Kingdom) N Broad (United States) B Shelton	3	6^{6}	6^{6}
2	(Australia) T Woodbridge (Australia) M Woodforde	6	7^{8}	7^{8}

Third round
(Netherlands) J Eltingh (Netherlands) T Kempers	3	4	4
9	(Australia) M Kratzmann (Australia) W Masur	6	6	6
(Australia) N Borwick (Australia) S Youl	7^{7}	4	3	6	6
2	(Australia) T Woodbridge (Australia) M Woodforde	6^{3}	6	6	3	8

Quarterfinals
9	(Australia) M Kratzmann (Australia) W Masur	7^{7}	6^{5}	5	3
2	(Australia) T Woodbridge (Australia) M Woodforde	6^{5}	7^{7}	7	6
