= 1992 Wimbledon Championships – Mixed doubles =

Mixed doubles
- 1992 Wimbledon Championships

Final
- Champions: (Czechoslovakia) Cyril Suk (Latvia) Larisa Neiland
- Runners-up: (Netherlands) Jacco Eltingh (Netherlands) Miriam Oremans
- Score: 7–6^{(7–2)}, 6–2

Details
- Draw: 64 (5 WC )
- Seeds: 16

Events
Singles	men	women		boys	girls
Doubles	men	women	mixed	boys	girls
WC Singles	men	women	quad
WC Doubles	men	women	quad
Legends	men	women	seniors
← 1991 ·	Wimbledon Championships	· 1993 →

John Fitzgerald and Elizabeth Smylie were the defending champions but lost in the second round to Jim Pugh and Natasha Zvereva.

Cyril Suk and Larisa Neiland defeated Jacco Eltingh and Miriam Oremans in the final, 7–6^{(7–2)}, 6–2 to win the mixed doubles tennis title at the 1992 Wimbledon Championships.

== Seeds ==
1. (Australia) Todd Woodbridge / (Czechoslovakia) Jana Novotná (quarterfinals)
2. (Sweden) Anders Järryd / (Czechoslovakia) Helena Suková (third round)
3. (Czechoslovakia) Cyril Suk / (Latvia) Larisa Neiland (champions)
4. (United States) Rick Leach / (United States) Zina Garrison (second round)
5. (United States) Kelly Jones / (United States) Gigi Fernández (third round)
6. (Canada) Glenn Michibata / (Canada) Jill Hetherington (first round)
7. (Australia) Mark Woodforde / (Australia) Nicole Provis (third round)
8. (Netherlands) Tom Nijssen / (Netherlands) Manon Bollegraf (semifinals)
9. (Australia) John Fitzgerald / (Australia) Elizabeth Smylie (second round)
10. (Australia) David Macpherson / (Australia) Rachel McQuillan (first round)
11. (Canada) Grant Connell / (United States) Kathy Rinaldi (second round)
12. (Australia) Mark Kratzmann / (United States) Pam Shriver (second round)
13. (United States) Todd Witsken / (United States) Katrina Adams (first round)
14. (United States) Steve DeVries / (United States) Patty Fendick (first round)
15. (Australia) Laurie Warder / (Australia) Rennae Stubbs (third round)
16. (United States) Scott Davis / (United States) Robin White (first round)

Click on the seed number of a player to go to their draw section.

== Draw ==
=== Key ===
- Q = Qualifier
- WC = Wild card
- LL = Lucky loser
- Alt = Alternate
- SE = Special exempt
- PR = Protected ranking
- ITF = ITF entry
- JE = Junior exempt
- w/o = Walkover
- r = Retired
- d = Defaulted
- SR = Special ranking

=== Finals ===
Quarterfinals
1	(Australia) Todd Woodbridge (Czechoslovakia) Jana Novotná	3	6	7
8	(Netherlands) Tom Nijssen (Netherlands) Manon Bollegraf	6	0	9
(United States) Jonathan Stark (United States) Debbie Graham	6^{2}	4
(Netherlands) Jacco Eltingh (Netherlands) Miriam Oremans	7^{7}	6
(Australia) Jason Stoltenberg (Czechoslovakia) Andrea Strnadová	6	4	6
3	(Czechoslovakia) Cyril Suk (Latvia) Larisa Neiland	4	6	8
(United States) Bryan Shelton (United States) Lori McNeil	7^{10}	6
(United States) Luke Jensen (United States) Jennifer Capriati	6^{8}	2

Semifinals
8	(Netherlands) Tom Nijssen (Netherlands) Manon Bollegraf	7	6^{3}	1
(Netherlands) Jacco Eltingh (Netherlands) Miriam Oremans	5	7^{7}	6
3	(Czechoslovakia) Cyril Suk (Latvia) Larisa Neiland	7^{7}	6
(United States) Bryan Shelton (United States) Lori McNeil	6^{5}	4

Final
(Netherlands) Jacco Eltingh (Netherlands) Miriam Oremans	6^{2}	2
3	(Czechoslovakia) Cyril Suk (Latvia) Larisa Neiland	7^{7}	6

=== Top half ===
==== Section 1 ====
First round
1	(Australia) T Woodbridge (Czechoslovakia) J Novotná	7^{7}	7^{7}
(South Africa) B Talbot (France) I Demongeot	6^{5}	6^{2}
(United States) T Kronemann (United States) G Helgeson	6	5	3
(United States) K Kinnear (South Africa) R Fairbank-Nideffer	4	7	6
(Zimbabwe) B Black (United States) C Kuhlman	3	6	4
(United States) J Pugh (Commonwealth of Independent States) N Zvereva	6	4	6
(Mexico) L Lavalle (Mexico) L Novelo	3	1
9	(Australia) J Fitzgerald (Australia) E Smylie	6	6
11	(Canada) G Connell (United States) K Rinaldi	6	6
(Sweden) R Båthman (France) C Suire	4	0
(Finland) O Rahnasto (Czechoslovakia) K Habšudová	2	2
(United Kingdom) J Bates (United Kingdom) J Durie	6	6
(United States) M Briggs (Australia) M Jaggard-Lai	2	6	6
(Netherlands) M Oosting (Netherlands) N Muns-Jagerman	6	3	4
(Australia) N Borwick (Japan) E Iida	4	4
8	(Netherlands) T Nijssen (Netherlands) M Bollegraf	6	6

Second round
1	(Australia) T Woodbridge (Czechoslovakia) J Novotná	6	7
(United States) K Kinnear (South Africa) R Fairbank-Nideffer	3	5
(United States) J Pugh (Commonwealth of Independent States) N Zvereva	6	7^{7}
9	(Australia) J Fitzgerald (Australia) E Smylie	2	6^{3}
11	(Canada) G Connell (United States) K Rinaldi	3	6^{5}
(United Kingdom) J Bates (United Kingdom) J Durie	6	7^{7}
(United States) M Briggs (Australia) M Jaggard-Lai	4	4
8	(Netherlands) T Nijssen (Netherlands) M Bollegraf	6	6

Third round
1	(Australia) T Woodbridge (Czechoslovakia) J Novotná	6	7
(United States) J Pugh (Commonwealth of Independent States) N Zvereva	2	5
(United Kingdom) J Bates (United Kingdom) J Durie	4	5
8	(Netherlands) T Nijssen (Netherlands) M Bollegraf	6	7

Quarterfinals
1	(Australia) T Woodbridge (Czechoslovakia) J Novotná	3	6	7
8	(Netherlands) T Nijssen (Netherlands) M Bollegraf	6	0	9

==== Section 2 ====
First round
4	(United States) R Leach (United States) Z Garrison	6	6
(South Africa) P Aldrich (South Africa) L Gregory	4	2
(United States) J Stark (United States) D Graham	6	6
WC	(United Kingdom) M Petchey (United Kingdom) S Loosemore	2	4
(United States) B Garnett (Australia) K Radford	4	7^{10}	3
(United States) K Flach (United States) L Harvey-Wild	6	6^{8}	6
(Netherlands) M Schapers (Netherlands) B Schultz	4	7^{7}	6
14	(United States) S DeVries (United States) P Fendick	6	6^{3}	4
15	(Australia) L Warder (Australia) R Stubbs	6	3	6
(Latvia) Ģ Dzelde (Commonwealth of Independent States) L Meskhi	4	6	3
(South Africa) P Norval (South Africa) M de Swardt	6	5	2
(Czechoslovakia) V Flégl (Czechoslovakia) R Zrubáková	3	7	6
(Netherlands) J Eltingh (Netherlands) M Oremans	7^{7}	5	6
(Sweden) R Bergh (Belgium) S Appelmans	6^{5}	7	4
(United States) S Salumaa (Australia) J-A Faull	3	7	7
6	(Canada) G Michibata (Canada) J Hetherington	6	5	5

Second round
4	(United States) R Leach (United States) Z Garrison	4	7^{8}	6
(United States) J Stark (United States) D Graham	6	6^{6}	8
(United States) K Flach (United States) L Harvey-Wild	w/o
(Netherlands) M Schapers (Netherlands) B Schultz
15	(Australia) L Warder (Australia) R Stubbs	6	6
(Czechoslovakia) V Flégl (Czechoslovakia) R Zrubáková	3	4
(Netherlands) J Eltingh (Netherlands) M Oremans	3	6	6
(United States) S Salumaa (Australia) J-A Faull	6	4	4

Third round
(United States) J Stark (United States) D Graham	2	7^{8}	6
(Netherlands) M Schapers (Netherlands) B Schultz	6	6^{6}	0
15	(Australia) L Warder (Australia) R Stubbs	3	4
(Netherlands) J Eltingh (Netherlands) M Oremans	6	6

Quarterfinals
(United States) J Stark (United States) D Graham	6^{2}	4
(Netherlands) J Eltingh (Netherlands) M Oremans	7^{7}	6

=== Bottom half ===
==== Section 3 ====
First round
7	(Australia) M Woodforde (Australia) N Provis	6	6
(Commonwealth of Independent States) A Olhovskiy (United States) S Collins	2	2
(Belgium) L Pimek (Czechoslovakia) P Langrová	3	6	6
WC	(United Kingdom) C Wilkinson (United Kingdom) S Gomer	6	3	4
(Australia) J Stoltenberg (Czechoslovakia) A Strnadová	6	6^{3}	6
(United States) C Beckman (United States) M Louie Harper	4	7^{7}	4
(Czechoslovakia) D Vacek (Germany) C Porwik	6	5	6
10	(Australia) D Macpherson (Australia) R McQuillan	3	7	2
13	(United States) T Witsken (United States) K Adams	4	6^{6}
(Netherlands) T Kempers (Netherlands) C Vis	6	7^{8}
(United Kingdom) N Broad (United Kingdom) C Wood	7^{7}	5	12
WC	(Argentina) J Frana (Argentina) G Sabatini	6^{4}	7	14
(Australia) B Dyke (United States) C MacGregor	6	6
(Australia) S Youl (Australia) L Field	3	4
WC	(Switzerland) H Günthardt (Germany) S Graf	4	4
3	(Czechoslovakia) C Suk (Latvia) L Neiland	6	6

Second round
7	(Australia) M Woodforde (Australia) N Provis	6	6
(Belgium) L Pimek (Czechoslovakia) P Langrová	2	3
(Australia) J Stoltenberg (Czechoslovakia) A Strnadová	6	6
(Czechoslovakia) D Vacek (Germany) C Porwik	2	4
(Netherlands) T Kempers (Netherlands) C Vis	6^{5}	5
WC	(Argentina) J Frana (Argentina) G Sabatini	7^{7}	7
(Australia) B Dyke (United States) C MacGregor	5	2
3	(Czechoslovakia) C Suk (Latvia) L Neiland	7	6

Third round
7	(Australia) M Woodforde (Australia) N Provis	2	5
(Australia) J Stoltenberg (Czechoslovakia) A Strnadová	6	7
WC	(Argentina) J Frana (Argentina) G Sabatini	w/o
3	(Czechoslovakia) C Suk (Latvia) L Neiland

Quarterfinals
(Australia) J Stoltenberg (Czechoslovakia) A Strnadová	6	4	6
3	(Czechoslovakia) C Suk (Latvia) L Neiland	4	6	8

==== Section 4 ====
First round
5	(United States) K Jones (United States) G Fernández	6	4	6
(United States) P Galbraith (Australia) T Morton	1	6	3
(South Africa) D Visser (South Africa) E Reinach	6	6
(United States) G Van Emburgh (United States) S McCarthy	2	2
(United States) B Shelton (United States) L McNeil	6	6
(Netherlands) J Siemerink (Netherlands) I Driehuis	4	2
(South Africa) D Adams (Australia) K-A Guse	5	3
12	(Australia) M Kratzmann (United States) P Shriver	7	6
16	(United States) S Davis (United States) R White	3	2
(United States) L Jensen (United States) J Capriati	6	6
(United States) T Nelson (United States) G Magers	5	6	6
(United States) D Randall (Germany) W Probst	7	3	4
WC	(United States) P Annacone (United States) E Burgin	2	3
(United States) M Keil (France) N van Lottum	6	6
(United States) J Brown (United States) S Stafford	2	3
2	(Sweden) A Järryd (Czechoslovakia) H Suková	6	6

Second round
5	(United States) K Jones (United States) G Fernández	3	7	9
(South Africa) D Visser (South Africa) E Reinach	6	5	7
(United States) B Shelton (United States) L McNeil	4	7^{7}	11
12	(Australia) M Kratzmann (United States) P Shriver	6	6^{5}	9
(United States) L Jensen (United States) J Capriati	6	7^{9}
(United States) T Nelson (United States) G Magers	2	6^{7}
(United States) M Keil (France) N van Lottum	4	4
2	(Sweden) A Järryd (Czechoslovakia) H Suková	6	6

Third round
5	(United States) K Jones (United States) G Fernández	3	5
(United States) B Shelton (United States) L McNeil	6	7
(United States) L Jensen (United States) J Capriati	6	6
2	(Sweden) A Järryd (Czechoslovakia) H Suková	3	3

Quarterfinals
(United States) B Shelton (United States) L McNeil	7^{10}	6
(United States) L Jensen (United States) J Capriati	6^{8}	2
