= Jimmy Jackson (tennis) =

American tennis player

- Full name: Jimmy Jackson Jr.
- Country (sports): United States
- Born: May 10, 1975 (age 51) Durham, North Carolina

Singles
- Highest ranking: No. 602 (Aug 14, 1995)

Grand Slam singles results
- US Open: Q1 (1994)

Doubles
- Highest ranking: No. 592 (Jun 12, 1995)

Grand Slam doubles results
- US Open: Q1 (1994)

Jimmy Jackson (born May 10, 1975), also known as J.J. Jackson, is an American former professional tennis player.

Born and raised in North Carolina, Jackson trained out of Hendersonville before relocating to Tampa, Florida. He won the boys' doubles title at the 1992 US Open (with Eric Taino) and was a world number one ranked junior doubles player.

Jackson competed mostly in satellite tournaments and reached a best singles world ranking of 602. In 1994, he was featured in the men's singles qualifying for the US Open. Retiring in 1999, he now coaches tennis in Seattle.

== Junior Grand Slam titles ==
=== Doubles (1) ===
No.	Date	Tournament	Surface	Partner	Opponents	Score
1.	Sep 1992	US Open	Hard	(United States) Eric Taino	(Chile) Marcelo Ríos (Chile) Gabriel Silberstein	6–3, 6–7, 6–4
