= Mark Schofield =

British tennis player

- Country (sports): (United Kingdom) Great Britain
- Born: 31 March 1974 (age 50)

Singles
- Highest ranking: No. 839 (11 May 1992)

Grand Slam singles results
- Wimbledon: Q1 (1992)

Doubles
- Career record: 0–1
- Highest ranking: No. 663 (10 May 1993)

Grand Slam doubles results
- Wimbledon: Q1 (1992)

Mark Schofield (born 31 March 1974) is a British former professional tennis player.

A native of Blackburn, Schofield was an eight-time Lancashire singles champion and played one year on tour as a professional player. He featured in the doubles main draw at Queen's in 1991 and in qualifying at Wimbledon in 1992.

Schofield left the international circuit in 1993 to concentrate on coaching.
