= Steven Baldas =

Australian tennis player

- Country (sports): Australia
- Born: 18 June 1974 (age 52) Adelaide, Australia
- Height: 1.80 m (5 ft 11 in)
- Plays: Right-handed
- Prize money: $7,440

Singles
- Career record: 0–1
- Career titles: 0; 0 Challenger, 0 Futures
- Highest ranking: No. 490 (9 August 1993)

Grand Slam singles results
- Australian Open: Q2 (1993)

Doubles
- Career record: 0–1
- Career titles: 0; 0 Challenger, 0 Futures
- Highest ranking: No. 265 (23 May 1994)

Grand Slam doubles results
- Australian Open: 1R (1993)
- Last updated on: 19 May 2022.

Steven Baldas (born 18 June 1974) is an Australian sports administrator and former professional tennis player.

Baldas, a native of Adelaide, attended Saint Ignatius' College.

In 1992, Baldas partnered with Scott Draper to win the Wimbledon junior doubles championship, over Mahesh Bhupathi and Nitten Kirrtane in the final. He finished the year ranked three in the world junior doubles rankings.

Baldas featured in the men's doubles main draw of the 1993 Australian Open partnering Mark Draper.

From 1995 to 1998, Baldas played collegiate tennis at the University of Georgia, earning All-American honours in each on his four seasons. He won the 1997 ITA Clay Court Doubles Championships with John Roddick, the brother of Andy.

== Junior Grand Slam finals ==
=== Doubles: 1 (1 title) ===
Result	Year	Tournament	Surface	Partner	Opponents	Score
Win	1992	Wimbledon	Grass	(Australia) Scott Draper	(India) Mahesh Bhupathi (India) Nitten Kirrtane	6–1, 4–6, 9–7
