= 1992 Wimbledon Championships – Women's doubles =

Women's doubles
- 1992 Wimbledon Championships

Final
- Champions: (United States) Gigi Fernández (Commonwealth of Independent States) Natasha Zvereva
- Runners-up: (Latvia) Larisa Neiland (Czechoslovakia) Jana Novotná
- Score: 6–4, 6–1

Details
- Draw: 64 (4 Q / 4 WC )
- Seeds: 16

Events
Singles	men	women		boys	girls
Doubles	men	women	mixed	boys	girls
WC Singles	men	women	quad
WC Doubles	men	women	quad
Legends	men	women	seniors
← 1991 ·	Wimbledon Championships	· 1993 →

Larisa Neiland and Natasha Zvereva were the defending champions, but decided not to play together.

Zvereva and Gigi Fernández defeated Neiland and Jana Novotná in the final, 6–4, 6–1 to win the ladies' doubles tennis title at the 1992 Wimbledon Championships.

== Seeds ==
1. (Czechoslovakia) Jana Novotná / (Latvia) Larisa Neiland (final)
2. (United States) Gigi Fernández / (Commonwealth of Independent States) Natasha Zvereva (champions)
3. (Spain) Arantxa Sánchez Vicario / (Czechoslovakia) Helena Suková (semifinals)
4. (United States) Martina Navratilova / (United States) Pam Shriver (semifinals)
5. (United States) Mary Joe Fernández / (United States) Zina Garrison (fourth round)
6. (United States) Katrina Adams / (Netherlands) Manon Bollegraf (third round)
7. (United States) Lori McNeil / (Australia) Rennae Stubbs (fourth round)
8. (Canada) Jill Hetherington / (United States) Kathy Rinaldi (first round)
9. (United States) Patty Fendick / (Czechoslovakia) Andrea Strnadová (third round)
10. (United States) Sandy Collins / (South Africa) Elna Reinach (third round)
11. (Australia) Nicole Provis / (Australia) Elizabeth Smylie (first round)
12. (Australia) Rachel McQuillan / (Germany) Claudia Porwik (first round)
13. (France) Isabelle Demongeot / (France) Nathalie Tauziat (third round)
14. (Germany) Anke Huber / (Germany) Claudia Kohde-Kilsch (third round)
15. (Bulgaria) Katerina Maleeva / (Germany) Barbara Rittner (third round)
16. (United States) Gretchen Magers / (United States) Robin White (fourth round)

Click on the seed number of a player to go to their draw section.

== Draw ==
=== Key ===
- Q = Qualifier
- WC = Wild card
- LL = Lucky loser
- Alt = Alternate
- ITF = ITF entry
- PR = Protected ranking
- SR = Special ranking
- SE = Special exempt
- JE = Junior exempt
- JR = Junior Accelerator Programme entrant
- CO = College Accelerator Programme entrant
- NG = Next Gen Accelerator Program entrant
- w/o = Walkover
- r = Retired
- d = Defaulted

=== Finals ===
Quarterfinals
1	(Czechoslovakia) Jana Novotná (Latvia) Larisa Neiland	6	7^{7}
16	(United States) Gretchen Magers (United States) Robin White	2	6^{4}
4	(United States) Martina Navratilova (United States) Pam Shriver	6	6
(Australia) Jo-Anne Faull (New Zealand) Julie Richardson	3	1
5	(United States) Mary Joe Fernández (United States) Zina Garrison	2	4
3	(Spain) Arantxa Sánchez Vicario (Czechoslovakia) Helena Suková	6	6
7	(United States) Lori McNeil (Australia) Rennae Stubbs	0	3
2	(United States) Gigi Fernández (Commonwealth of Independent States) Natasha Zvereva	6	6

Semifinals
1	(Czechoslovakia) Jana Novotná (Latvia) Larisa Neiland	7	6^{3}	6
4	(United States) Martina Navratilova (United States) Pam Shriver	5	7^{7}	3
3	(Spain) Arantxa Sánchez Vicario (Czechoslovakia) Helena Suková	1	7^{7}	5
2	(United States) Gigi Fernández (Commonwealth of Independent States) Natasha Zvereva	6	6^{2}	7

Final
1	(Czechoslovakia) Jana Novotná (Latvia) Larisa Neiland	4	1
2	(United States) Gigi Fernández (Commonwealth of Independent States) Natasha Zvereva	6	6

=== Top half ===
==== Section 1 ====
First round
1	(Czechoslovakia) J Novotná (Latvia) L Neiland	6	6
(United States) C Benjamin (United States) J Santrock	4	4
(Japan) K Date (Japan) M Kidowaki	6^{5}	3
(United States) J Fuchs (Czechoslovakia) K Habšudová	7^{7}	6
(Argentina) B Fulco-Villella (United States) J Smoller	2	1^{r}
(Commonwealth of Independent States) L Meskhi (Austria) J Wiesner	6	3
Q	(Australia) J Hodder (Australia) K Sharpe	3	2
9	(United States) P Fendick (Czechoslovakia) A Strnadová	6	6
16	(United States) G Magers (United States) R White	7	6
(Italy) L Garrone (Italy) L Golarsa	5	3
(United States) S Stafford (United States) M Werdel	0	1
(Indonesia) Y Basuki (United Kingdom) J Durie	6	6
Q	(Netherlands) C Bakkum (Sweden) M Strandlund	6	6
(United States) L Glitz (United States) C Kuhlman	3	1
(United States) A Frazier (Japan) R Hiraki	1	2
6	(United States) K Adams (Netherlands) M Bollegraf	6	6

Second round
1	(Czechoslovakia) J Novotná (Latvia) L Neiland	6	6
(United States) J Fuchs (Czechoslovakia) K Habšudová	3	1
(Commonwealth of Independent States) L Meskhi (Austria) J Wiesner	4	1
9	(United States) P Fendick (Czechoslovakia) A Strnadová	6	6
16	(United States) G Magers (United States) R White	6	6
(Indonesia) Y Basuki (United Kingdom) J Durie	1	4
Q	(Netherlands) C Bakkum (Sweden) M Strandlund	6	3	0
6	(United States) K Adams (Netherlands) M Bollegraf	4	6	6

Third round
1	(Czechoslovakia) J Novotná (Latvia) L Neiland	6	6
9	(United States) P Fendick (Czechoslovakia) A Strnadová	2	2
16	(United States) G Magers (United States) R White	6	3	6
6	(United States) K Adams (Netherlands) M Bollegraf	4	6	3

Quarterfinals
1	(Czechoslovakia) J Novotná (Latvia) L Neiland	6	7^{7}
16	(United States) G Magers (United States) R White	2	6^{4}

==== Section 2 ====
First round
4	(United States) M Navratilova (United States) P Shriver	6	6
(Australia) M Jaggard-Lai (Netherlands) C Vis	1	2
WC	(South Africa) R Fairbank-Nideffer (United States) E Nagelsen	6	6
(France) P Paradis-Mangon (France) S Testud	3	4
(Australia) K Godridge (Germany) K Kschwendt	7^{7}	3	1
(Australia) K-A Guse (Australia) T Morton	6^{3}	6	6
(Germany) M Babel (Germany) W Probst	6	3	2
14	(Germany) A Huber (Germany) C Kohde-Kilsch	2	6	6
12	(Australia) R McQuillan (Germany) C Porwik	4	6	3
(Australia) J-A Faull (New Zealand) J Richardson	6	4	6
Q	(Japan) A Kijimuta (Japan) N Sawamatsu	6	6
(Australia) J Byrne (Argentina) P Tarabini	2	0
(France) N van Lottum (Czechoslovakia) J Pospíšilová	7^{7}	6
(United Kingdom) C Hall (United Kingdom) S-A Siddall	6^{3}	3
(United States) E Burgin (South Africa) M de Swardt	6	6
8	(Canada) J Hetherington (United States) K Rinaldi	2	3

Second round
4	(United States) M Navratilova (United States) P Shriver	6	6^{4}	7
WC	(South Africa) R Fairbank-Nideffer (United States) E Nagelsen	4	7^{7}	5
(Australia) K-A Guse (Australia) T Morton	3	7^{7}	2
14	(Germany) A Huber (Germany) C Kohde-Kilsch	6	6^{5}	6
(Australia) J-A Faull (New Zealand) J Richardson	6	6
Q	(Japan) A Kijimuta (Japan) N Sawamatsu	2	3
(France) N van Lottum (Czechoslovakia) J Pospíšilová	5	3
(United States) E Burgin (South Africa) M de Swardt	7	6

Third round
4	(United States) M Navratilova (United States) P Shriver	6	6
14	(Germany) A Huber (Germany) C Kohde-Kilsch	1	2
(Australia) J-A Faull (New Zealand) J Richardson	6	5	6
(United States) E Burgin (South Africa) M de Swardt	4	7	0

Quarterfinals
4	(United States) M Navratilova (United States) P Shriver	6	6
(Australia) J-A Faull (New Zealand) J Richardson	3	1

=== Bottom half ===
==== Section 3 ====
First round
5	(United States) MJ Fernández (United States) Z Garrison	6	6
(United States) N Arendt (United States) S McCarthy	2	4
WC	(United Kingdom) A Grunfeld (United Kingdom) J Salmon	6	1	1
(Italy) S Farina (Italy) L Ferrando	3	6	6
(Germany) E Pfaff (France) C Suire	4	4
(Australia) L Field (South Africa) L Gregory	6	6
(France) A Dechaume (France) J Halard	4	5
10	(United States) S Collins (South Africa) E Reinach	6	7
15	(Bulgaria) K Maleeva (Germany) B Rittner	4	7^{7}	6
(United States) D Graham (United States) G Helgeson	6	6^{4}	3
(Peru) L Gildemeister (Argentina) F Labat	7^{9}	6
(Spain) A Segura (Spain) J Souto	6^{7}	1
(Czechoslovakia) P Langrová (Czechoslovakia) R Zrubáková	4	3
(Japan) E Iida (Sweden) M Lindström	6	6
(United Kingdom) B Borneo (United Kingdom) C Wood	2	6	2
3	(Spain) A Sánchez Vicario (Czechoslovakia) H Suková	6	1	6

Second round
5	(United States) MJ Fernández (United States) Z Garrison	6	6
(Italy) S Farina (Italy) L Ferrando	2	3
(Australia) L Field (South Africa) L Gregory	3	2
10	(United States) S Collins (South Africa) E Reinach	6	6
15	(Bulgaria) K Maleeva (Germany) B Rittner	6	4	7
(Peru) L Gildemeister (Argentina) F Labat	0	6	5
(Japan) E Iida (Sweden) M Lindström	6^{2}	1
3	(Spain) A Sánchez Vicario (Czechoslovakia) H Suková	7^{7}	6

Third round
5	(United States) MJ Fernández (United States) Z Garrison	6^{5}	6	6
10	(United States) S Collins (South Africa) E Reinach	7	4	2
15	(Bulgaria) K Maleeva (Germany) B Rittner	4	2
3	(Spain) A Sánchez Vicario (Czechoslovakia) H Suková	6	6

Quarterfinals
5	(United States) MJ Fernández (United States) Z Garrison	2	4
3	(Spain) A Sánchez Vicario (Czechoslovakia) H Suková	6	6

==== Section 4 ====
First round
7	(United States) L McNeil (Australia) R Stubbs	6	6
(United States) M Louie Harper (United States) C MacGregor	2	4
(Commonwealth of Independent States) E Brioukhovets (Commonwealth of Independent States) N Medvedeva	7^{7}	6
(United States) M-L Daniels (United States) L Harvey-Wild	6^{3}	2
Q	(Australia) D Jones (South Africa) T Price	3	6	6
WC	(United Kingdom) M Javer (United Kingdom) V Lake	6	0	1
(Belgium) S Appelmans (Netherlands) M Oremans	6	4	5
13	(France) I Demongeot (France) N Tauziat	2	6	7
11	(Australia) N Provis (Australia) E Smylie	4	6	1
(United States) H Ludloff (Spain) C Martínez	6	4	6
(Mexico) L Novelo (Australia) K Radford	6	6
(Czechoslovakia) A Noháčová (Czechoslovakia) R Rajchrtová	4	4
(Bulgaria) M Maleeva (Switzerland) M Maleeva-Fragnière	7^{7}	2	5
(Netherlands) N Muns-Jagerman (Netherlands) B Schultz	6^{4}	6	7
(United States) B Bowes (United States) T Whitlinger	2	1
2	(United States) G Fernández (Commonwealth of Independent States) N Zvereva	6	6

Second round
7	(United States) L McNeil (Australia) R Stubbs	7	2	6
(Commonwealth of Independent States) E Brioukhovets (Commonwealth of Independent States) N Medvedeva	5	6	4
Q	(Australia) D Jones (South Africa) T Price	7^{9}	2	10
13	(France) I Demongeot (France) N Tauziat	6^{7}	6	12
(United States) H Ludloff (Spain) C Martínez	6	3	6
(Mexico) L Novelo (Australia) K Radford	4	6	8
(Netherlands) N Muns-Jagerman (Netherlands) B Schultz	3	2
2	(United States) G Fernández (Commonwealth of Independent States) N Zvereva	6	6

Third round
7	(United States) L McNeil (Australia) R Stubbs	6	6
13	(France) I Demongeot (France) N Tauziat	4	4
(Mexico) L Novelo (Australia) K Radford	2	7^{8}	2
2	(United States) G Fernández (Commonwealth of Independent States) N Zvereva	6	6^{6}	6

Quarterfinals
7	(United States) L McNeil (Australia) R Stubbs	0	3
2	(United States) G Fernández (Commonwealth of Independent States) N Zvereva	6	6
