= Andrew Richardson (tennis) =

British tennis player

- Country (sports): (United Kingdom) Great Britain
- Born: 14 March 1974 (age 51) Peterborough, England
- Height: 6 ft 7 in (201 cm)
- Turned pro: 1992
- Retired: 2000
- Plays: Left-handed
- Coach: David Sammel
- Prize money: $246,675

Singles
- Career record: 6-14
- Career titles: 0; 1 Challenger
- Highest ranking: No. 133 (3 November 1997)

Grand Slam singles results
- Australian Open: Q3 (1997, 1998)
- French Open: Q1 (1997, 1998)
- Wimbledon: 3R (1997)
- US Open: Q3 (1996)

Doubles
- Career record: 15-31
- Career titles: 0
- Highest ranking: No. 96 (21 October 1996)

Grand Slam doubles results
- Australian Open: 2R (1997)
- French Open: 1R (1996)
- Wimbledon: 2R (1992, 1995, 1996)
- US Open: 2R (1996)

Andrew Richardson (born 14 March 1974) is a British former professional tennis player, and now the Director of the Ferrer Tennis Academy in La Nucía, Spain

== Career ==
Richardson competed in the singles draw of a Grand Slam three times, all at Wimbledon and on each occasion as a wildcard. In both 1992 and 1998 he lost in the opening round, to Marc Rosset and Hicham Arazi respectively. However, in the 1997 Wimbledon Championships he reached the third round, with wins over Spanish qualifier Sergi Duran in straight sets and then another Spaniard Juan Albert Viloca, in five sets. He was eliminated by countryman Greg Rusedski in the third round.

He was more successful as a doubles player, winning five tournaments on the ATP Challenger Tour. One of those, at Seoul in 1995, was with Tim Henman as his partner. The pair also reached the semi-finals of the 1996 Czech Indoor tournament, an ATP Tour event. Richardson would later be a best man at Henman's wedding.

In 1997, Richardson represented an understrength Great Britain Davis Cup team against Zimbabwe. He defeated Byron Black in a singles match, to level the tie at 1–1 but his second match, against Byron's brother Wayne, which Richardson lost, was a dead-rubber, with Zimbabwe having already secured the tie.

He is now a tennis coach and has worked with British players Ross Hutchins, Miles Kasiri, Alan Mackin and Emma Raducanu. Richardson worked with Raducanu during the 2021 US Open, in which she became the first qualifier to win a grand slam title, and the first British woman to do so since Virginia Wade's Wimbledon title in 1977.

== Challenger titles ==
=== Singles: (1) ===
No.	Year	Tournament	Surface	Opponent	Score
1.	1997	Urbana, U.S.	Hard	(United States) Cecil Mamiit	6–7, 7–6, 6–3

=== Doubles: (5) ===
No.	Year	Tournament	Surface	Partner	Opponents	Score
1.	1995	Seoul, South Korea	Clay	(United Kingdom) Tim Henman	(Italy) Filippo Messori (Italy) Vincenzo Santopadre	6–2, 6–1
2.	1995	Rogaška Slatina, Slovenia	Carpet	(United Kingdom) Mark Petchey	(Germany) Patrick Baur (Netherlands) Joost Winnink	6–7, 6–4, 6–4
3.	1996	Bristol, England	Grass	(Czech Republic) Petr Pala	(France) Lionel Barthez (Germany) Patrick Baur	6–2, 6–4
4.	1998	Lippstadt, Germany	Carpet	(South Africa) Myles Wakefield	(Netherlands) Raemon Sluiter (Netherlands) Peter Wessels	4–6, 7–6, 6–4
5.	1998	Lübeck, Germany	Carpet	(Switzerland) Lorenzo Manta	(France) Stephane Simian (Finland) Tuomas Ketola	7–6, 6–2
