= 1992 Wimbledon Championships =

- Date: 22 June – 5 July
- Edition: 106th
- Category: Grand Slam (ITF)
- Draw: 128S/64D/64XD
- Prize money: £4,416,820
- Surface: Grass
- Location: Church Road; SW19, Wimbledon, London, United Kingdom
- Venue: All England Lawn Tennis and Croquet Club

Champions

Men's singles
- (United States) Andre Agassi

Women's singles
- (Germany) Steffi Graf

Men's doubles
- (United States) John McEnroe / (Germany) Michael Stich

Women's doubles
- (United States) Gigi Fernández / (Commonwealth of Independent States) Natasha Zvereva

Mixed doubles
- (Czechoslovakia) Cyril Suk / (Latvia) Larisa Neiland

Boys' singles
- (Czechoslovakia) David Škoch

Girls' singles
- (United States) Chanda Rubin

Boys' doubles
- (Australia) Steven Baldas / (Australia) Scott Draper

Girls' doubles
- (Australia) Maija Avotins / (Australia) Lisa McShea

Gentlemen's invitation doubles
- (United States) Peter Fleming / (United States) Stan Smith

Ladies' invitation doubles
- (Australia) Wendy Turnbull / (United Kingdom) Virginia Wade

Senior gentlemen's invitation doubles
- (United States) Marty Riessen / (United States) Sherwood Stewart
← 1991 ·	Wimbledon Championships	· 1993 →

The 1992 Wimbledon Championships was a tennis tournament played on grass courts at the All England Lawn Tennis and Croquet Club in Wimbledon, London in the United Kingdom. It was the 106th edition of the Wimbledon Championships and were held from 22 June to 5 July 1992.

== Prize money ==
The total prize money for 1992 championships was £4,416,820. The winner of the men's title earned £265,000 while the women's singles champion earned £240,000.

Event	W	F	SF	QF	Round of 16	Round of 32	Round of 64	Round of 128
Men's singles	£265,000	£132,500	£66,250	£34,450	£18,550	£10,730	£6,490	£3,975
Women's singles	£240,000	£120,000	£57,970	£29,280	£14,840	£8,315	£5,035	£3,080
Men's doubles *	£108,570							—
Women's doubles *	£93,920							—
Mixed doubles *	£46,070							—

_{* per team}

== Champions ==
=== Seniors ===
==== Men's singles ====
(United States) Andre Agassi defeated (Croatia) Goran Ivanišević, 6–7^{(8–10)}, 6–4, 6–4, 1–6, 6–4

- It was Agassi's 1st career Grand Slam title and only Wimbledon title.

==== Women's singles ====
(Germany) Steffi Graf defeated (Federal Republic of Yugoslavia) Monica Seles, 6–2, 6–1

- It was Graf's 11th career Grand Slam title and her 4th Wimbledon title.

==== Men's doubles ====
(United States) John McEnroe / (Germany) Michael Stich defeated (United States) Jim Grabb / (United States) Richey Reneberg, 5–7, 7–6^{(7–5)}, 3–6, 7–6^{(7–5)}, 19–17

- It was McEnroe's 17th and last career Grand Slam title and his 8th Wimbledon title. It was Stich's 2nd and last career Grand Slam title and his 2nd Wimbledon title.

==== Women's doubles ====
(United States) Gigi Fernández / (Commonwealth of Independent States) Natasha Zvereva defeated (Latvia) Larisa Neiland / (Czechoslovakia) Jana Novotná, 6–4, 6–1

- It was Fernández's 5th career Grand Slam title and her 1st Wimbledon title. It was Zvereva's 6th career Grand Slam title and her 2nd Wimbledon title.

==== Mixed doubles ====
(Czechoslovakia) Cyril Suk / (Latvia) Larisa Neiland defeated (Netherlands) Jacco Eltingh / (Netherlands) Miriam Oremans, 7–6^{(7–2)}, 6–2

- It was Suk's 2nd career Grand Slam title and his 1st Wimbledon title. It was Neiland's 3rd career Grand Slam title and her 2nd Wimbledon title.

=== Juniors ===
==== Boys' singles ====
(Czechoslovakia) David Škoch defeated (United States) Brian Dunn, 6–4, 6–3

==== Girls' singles ====
(United States) Chanda Rubin defeated (Belgium) Laurence Courtois, 6–2, 7–5

==== Boys' doubles ====
(Australia) Steven Baldas / (Australia) Scott Draper defeated (India) Mahesh Bhupathi / (India) Nitin Kirtane, 6–1, 4–6, 9–7

==== Girls' doubles ====
(Australia) Maija Avotins / (Australia) Lisa McShea defeated (United States) Pam Nelson / (United States) Julie Steven, 2–6, 6–4, 6–3

=== Invitation ===
==== Gentlemen's invitation doubles ====
(United States) Peter Fleming / (United States) Stan Smith defeated (Australia) Mark Edmondson / (Australia) Kim Warwick, 6–7, 7–6, 6–4

==== Ladies' invitation doubles ====
(Australia) Wendy Turnbull / (United Kingdom) Virginia Wade defeated (United States) Rosie Casals / (United States) Sharon Walsh-Pete, 3–6, 6–3, 7–5

==== Senior gentlemen's invitation doubles ====
(United States) Marty Riessen / (United States) Sherwood Stewart defeated (Australia) John Newcombe / (Australia) Tony Roche, 3–6, 6–3, 6–3

== Singles seeds ==
=== Men's singles ===
1. (United States) Jim Courier (third round, lost to Andrei Olhovskiy)
2. (Sweden) Stefan Edberg (quarterfinals, lost to Goran Ivanišević)
3. (Germany) Michael Stich (quarterfinals, lost to Pete Sampras)
4. (Germany) Boris Becker (quarterfinals, lost to Andre Agassi)
5. (United States) Pete Sampras (semifinals, lost to Goran Ivanišević)
6. (Czechoslovakia) Petr Korda (second round, lost to Jakob Hlasek)
7. (United States) Michael Chang (first round, lost to Jeremy Bates)
8. (Croatia) Goran Ivanišević (final, lost to Andre Agassi)
9. (France) Guy Forget (quarterfinals, lost to John McEnroe)
10. (Czechoslovakia) Ivan Lendl (fourth round, lost to Goran Ivanišević)
11. (Netherlands) Richard Krajicek (third round, lost to Arnaud Boetsch)
12. (United States) Andre Agassi (champion)
13. (United States) Brad Gilbert (third round, lost to Wally Masur)
14. (South Africa) Wayne Ferreira (fourth round, lost to Boris Becker)
15. (Commonwealth of Independent States) Alexander Volkov (third round, lost to Henrik Holm)
16. (United States) David Wheaton (third round, lost to John McEnroe)

=== Women's singles ===
1. (Federal Republic of Yugoslavia) Monica Seles (final, lost to Steffi Graf)
2. (Germany) Steffi Graf (champion)
3. (Argentina) Gabriela Sabatini (semifinals, lost to Steffi Graf)
4. (United States) Martina Navratilova (semifinals, lost to Monica Seles)
5. (Spain) Arantxa Sánchez Vicario (second round, lost to Julie Halard)
6. (United States) Jennifer Capriati (quarterfinals, lost to Gabriela Sabatini)
7. (United States) Mary Joe Fernández (third round, lost to Amy Frazier)
8. (Spain) Conchita Martínez (second round, lost to Natasha Zvereva)
9. (Switzerland) Manuela Maleeva-Fragnière (third round, lost to Kristin Godridge)
10. (Germany) Anke Huber (third round, lost to Yayuk Basuki)
11. (Czechoslovakia) Jana Novotná (third round, lost to Patty Fendick)
12. (Bulgaria) Katerina Maleeva (quarterfinals, lost to Martina Navratilova)
13. (United States) Zina Garrison (fourth round, lost to Natasha Zvereva)
14. (France) Nathalie Tauziat (quarterfinals, lost to Monica Seles)
15. (Japan) Kimiko Date (second round, lost to Gigi Fernández)
16. (Austria) Judith Wiesner (third round, lost to Naoko Sawamatsu)

Preceded by 1992 French Open	Grand Slams	Succeeded by 1992 U.S. Open
