= 1999 Nottingham Open – Doubles =

Doubles
- 1999 Nottingham Open

Final
- Champions: (United States) Patrick Galbraith (United States) Justin Gimelstob
- Runners-up: (South Africa) Marius Barnard (South Africa) Brent Haygarth
- Score: 5–7, 7–5, 6–3

Details
- Draw: 16 (3WC)/1Q)
- Seeds: 4

Events
Singles	Doubles
← 1998 ·	Nottingham Open	· 2000 →

Justin Gimelstob and Byron Talbot were the defending champions, but Talbot did not partner this year. Gimelstob partnered Patrick Galbraith.

Galbraith and Gimelstob won the title, defeating Marius Barnard and Brent Haygarth 5–7, 7–5, 6–3 in the final.

== Seeds ==
1. (South Africa) David Adams / (South Africa) John-Laffnie de Jager (semifinals)
2. (Australia) Andrew Kratzmann / (France) Fabrice Santoro (semifinals)
3. (United States) Patrick Galbraith / (United States) Justin Gimelstob (champions)
4. (South Africa) Piet Norval / (Zimbabwe) Kevin Ullyett (quarterfinals)

== Draw ==
=== Key ===
- Q = Qualifier
- WC = Wild card
- LL = Lucky loser
- Alt = Alternate
- SE = Special exempt
- PR = Protected ranking
- ITF = ITF entry
- JE = Junior exempt
- w/o = Walkover
- r = Retired
- d = Defaulted
- SR = Special ranking

=== Draw ===
First round
1	(South Africa) D Adams (South Africa) J-L de Jager	6	6
(Argentina) P Albano (United States) M Keil	4	0
(United States) TJ Middleton (United States) J Waite	3	4
(South Africa) L Bale (United Kingdom) N Broad	6	6
4	(South Africa) P Norval (Zimbabwe) K Ullyett	4	7	6
WC	(United Kingdom) M Lee (United Kingdom) L Milligan	6	5	2
(New Zealand) J Greenhalgh (Italy) L Tieleman	6	1	3
(South Africa) M Barnard (South Africa) B Haygarth	3	6	6
(Italy) M Bertolini (Italy) C Brandi	6	6
WC	(United Kingdom) B Cowan (United Kingdom) C Wilkinson	4	4
Q	(Switzerland) R Federer (Sweden) M Norman	6	1
3	(United States) P Galbraith (United States) J Gimelstob	7	6
WC	(United Kingdom) M MacLagan (United Kingdom) T Spinks	2	4
(United States) J Grabb (United States) D Johnson	6	6
(Spain) A Martín (Belgium) T Vanhoudt	6	4	4
2	(Australia) A Kratzmann (France) F Santoro	1	6	6

Quarterfinals
1	(South Africa) D Adams (South Africa) J-L de Jager	4	7	7
(South Africa) L Bale (United Kingdom) N Broad	6	5	5
4	(South Africa) P Norval (Zimbabwe) K Ullyett	3	6
(South Africa) M Barnard (South Africa) B Haygarth	6	7
(Italy) M Bertolini (Italy) C Brandi	4	7	4
3	(United States) P Galbraith (United States) J Gimelstob	6	6	6
(United States) J Grabb (United States) D Johnson	6	7	6
2	(Australia) A Kratzmann (France) F Santoro	7	6	7

Semifinals
1	(South Africa) D Adams (South Africa) J-L de Jager	3	2
(South Africa) M Barnard (South Africa) B Haygarth	6	6
3	(United States) P Galbraith (United States) J Gimelstob	6	7
2	(Australia) A Kratzmann (France) F Santoro	1	6

Final
(South Africa) M Barnard (South Africa) B Haygarth	7	5	3
3	(United States) P Galbraith (United States) J Gimelstob	5	7	6

== Qualifying ==
=== Qualifying seeds ===
1. (Argentina) Guillermo Cañas / (Australia) Grant Silcock (first round)
2. (Philippines) Cecil Mamiit / (Japan) Takao Suzuki (qualifying competition)

=== Qualifiers ===
1. (Switzerland) Roger Federer / (Sweden) Magnus Norman

=== Qualifying draw ===
First round
1	(Argentina) Guillermo Cañas (Australia) Grant Silcock	1	6
WC	(Switzerland) Roger Federer (Sweden) Magnus Norman	6	7
(France) Arnaud Clément (France) Sébastien Grosjean	6	3	4
2	(Philippines) Cecil Mamiit (Japan) Takao Suzuki	3	6	6

Qualifying competition
WC	(Switzerland) Roger Federer (Sweden) Magnus Norman	6	7
2	(Philippines) Cecil Mamiit (Japan) Takao Suzuki	3	6
