= 1997 Nottingham Open – Doubles =

Doubles
- 1997 Nottingham Open

Final
- Champions: (South Africa) Ellis Ferreira (United States) Patrick Galbraith
- Runners-up: (United Kingdom) Danny Sapsford (United Kingdom) Chris Wilkinson
- Score: 4–6, 7–6, 7–6

Details
- Draw: 16
- Seeds: 4

Events
Singles	Doubles
- Nottingham Open

Mark Petchey and Danny Sapsford were the defending champions, but did not partner together this year. Petchey partnered Sargis Sargsian, losing in the first round. Sapsford partnered Chris Wilkinson, losing in the final.

Ellis Ferreira and Patrick Galbraith won the title, defeating Sapsford and Wilkinson 4–6, 7–6, 7–6 in the final.

== Seeds ==
1. (South Africa) Ellis Ferreira / (United States) Patrick Galbraith (champions)
2. (United States) Rick Leach / (South Africa) Byron Talbot (first round)
3. (Netherlands) Jan Siemerink / (Czech Republic) Cyril Suk (first round)
4. (United States) Donald Johnson / (United States) Francisco Montana (semifinals)

== Draw ==
Key

- Q = Qualifier
- WC = Wild card
- LL = Lucky loser
- Alt = Alternate
- ITF = ITF entry
- PR = Protected ranking
- SR = Special ranking
- SE = Special exempt
- JE = Junior exempt
- JR = Junior Accelerator Programme entrant
- CO = College Accelerator Programme entrant
- NG = Next Gen Accelerator Program entrant
- w/o = Walkover
- r = Retired
- d = Defaulted

=== Draw ===
First round
1	(South Africa) E Ferreira (United States) P Galbraith	6	6
(South Africa) D Adams (South Africa) M Barnard	1	3
(United States) J Gimelstob (Canada) D Nestor	7	7
(Portugal) N Marques (United States) J Tarango	6	6
3	(Netherlands) J Siemerink (Czech Republic) C Suk	4	4
(United Kingdom) N Broad (South Africa) G Muller	6	6
(Canada) G Connell (United States) S Davis	4	7	6
(United States) L Jensen (United States) M Jensen	6	5	7
(South Africa) B Haygarth (South Africa) P Norval	6	6
WC	(France) A Boetsch (United States) J Courier	1	2
(United States) K Jones (United States) J Waite	4	6
4	(United States) D Johnson (United States) F Montana	6	7
WC	(United Kingdom) M Petchey (Armenia) S Sargsian	4	4
Q	(South Africa) M Ondruska (South Africa) G Stafford	6	6
WC	(United Kingdom) D Sapsford (United Kingdom) C Wilkinson	6	3	6
2	(United States) R Leach (South Africa) R Talbot	2	6	3

Quarterfinals
1	(South Africa) E Ferreira (United States) P Galbraith	7	6
(United States) J Gimelstob (Canada) D Nestor	6	1
(United Kingdom) N Broad (South Africa) G Muller	7	3	7
(United States) L Jensen (United States) M Jensen	6	6	6
(South Africa) B Haygarth (South Africa) P Norval	6	7	4
4	(United States) D Johnson (United States) F Montana	7	6	6
Q	(South Africa) M Ondruska (South Africa) G Stafford	6	6	2
WC	(United Kingdom) D Sapsford (United Kingdom) C Wilkinson	3	7	6

Semifinals
1	(South Africa) E Ferreira (United States) P Galbraith	1	6	6
(United Kingdom) N Broad (South Africa) G Muller	6	3	2
4	(United States) D Johnson (United States) F Montana	6	6	4
WC	(United Kingdom) D Sapsford (United Kingdom) C Wilkinson	7	1	6

Final
1	(South Africa) E Ferreira (United States) P Galbraith	4	7	7
WC	(United Kingdom) D Sapsford (United Kingdom) C Wilkinson	6	6	6
