= 2000 Stella Artois Championships – Doubles =

Doubles
- 2000 Stella Artois Championships

Final
- Champions: (Australia) Todd Woodbridge (Australia) Mark Woodforde
- Runners-up: (United States) Jonathan Stark (Philippines) Eric Taino
- Score: 6–7^{(5–7)}, 6–3, 7–6^{(7–1)}

Details
- Draw: 28

Events
| Singles | Doubles |
| ← 1999 · | Queen's Club Championships | · 2001 → |

Sébastien Lareau and Alex O'Brien were the defending champions but they competed with different partners that year, Lareau with Daniel Nestor and O'Brien with Jared Palmer.

O'Brien and Palmer lost in the second round to Jonathan Stark and Eric Taino.

Lareau and Nestor lost in the semifinals to Todd Woodbridge and Mark Woodforde.

Woodbridge and Woodforde won in the final 6–7^{(5–7)}, 6–3, 7–6^{(7–1)} against Stark and Taino.

== Seeds ==
The top four seeded teams received byes into the second round.

1. (United States) Alex O'Brien / (United States) Jared Palmer (second round)
2. (Australia) Todd Woodbridge / (Australia) Mark Woodforde (champions)
3. (South Africa) David Adams / (South Africa) John-Laffnie de Jager (second round)
4. (Zimbabwe) Byron Black / (United States) Justin Gimelstob (second round)
5. (Canada) Sébastien Lareau / (Canada) Daniel Nestor (semifinals)
6. (Zimbabwe) Wayne Black / (Zimbabwe) Kevin Ullyett (semifinals)
7. (United States) Jan-Michael Gambill / (United States) Scott Humphries (second round)
8. (Australia) Wayne Arthurs / (Croatia) Goran Ivanišević (second round)

== Draw ==
=== Key ===
- Q = Qualifier
- WC = Wild card
- LL = Lucky loser
- Alt = Alternate
- SE = Special exempt
- PR = Protected ranking
- ITF = ITF entry
- JE = Junior exempt
- w/o = Walkover
- r = Retired
- d = Defaulted
- SR = Special ranking

=== Finals ===
Semifinals
(United States) Jonathan Stark (Philippines) Eric Taino | 7^{9} | 6
6 | (Zimbabwe) Wayne Black (Zimbabwe) Kevin Ullyett | 6^{7} | 1
5 | (Canada) Sébastien Lareau (Canada) Daniel Nestor | 6^{5} | 3
2 | (Australia) Todd Woodbridge (Australia) Mark Woodforde | 7^{7} | 6

Final
(United States) Jonathan Stark (Philippines) Eric Taino | 7^{7} | 3 | 6^{1}
2 | (Australia) Todd Woodbridge (Australia) Mark Woodforde | 6^{5} | 6 | 7^{7}

=== Top half ===
First round
(Italy) D Nargiso (Netherlands) J Siemerink | 4 | 6^{6}
(United States) J Stark (Philippines) E Taino | 6 | 7^{8}
(Australia) A Kratzmann (Australia) P Tramacchi | 6^{1} | 6 | 6
Q | (Australia) B Ellwood (Australia) A Painter | 7^{7} | 3 | 2
(Sweden) P Nyborg (Czech Republic) C Suk | 6^{3} | 6^{7}
7 | (United States) J-M Gambill (United States) S Humphries | 7^{7} | 7^{9}
(Belarus) M Mirnyi (Federal Republic of Yugoslavia) N Zimonjić | 7^{7} | 7^{7}
(France) J Boutter (South Africa) W Ferreira | 6^{5} | 6^{5}
(Spain) J I Carrasco (Spain) J Velasco Jr. | 5 | 7^{7} | 0
(United States) P Galbraith (United States) B MacPhie | 7 | 6^{4} | 6
Q | (United States) P Goldstein (United States) J Waite | 3 | 2
6 | (Zimbabwe) W Black (Zimbabwe) K Ullyett | 6 | 6

Second round
1 | (United States) A O'Brien (United States) J Palmer | 6 | 3 | 4
(United States) J Stark (Philippines) E Taino | 1 | 6 | 6
(Australia) A Kratzmann (Australia) P Tramacchi | 7 | 6
7 | (United States) J-M Gambill (United States) S Humphries | 5 | 4
3 | (South Africa) D Adams (South Africa) J-L de Jager | 2 | 1
(Belarus) M Mirnyi (Federal Republic of Yugoslavia) N Zimonjić | 6 | 6
(United States) P Galbraith (United States) B MacPhie | 6 | 3 | 5
6 | (Zimbabwe) W Black (Zimbabwe) K Ullyett | 4 | 6 | 7

Quarterfinals
(United States) J Stark (Philippines) E Taino | 6^{6} | 7^{7} | 6
(Australia) A Kratzmann (Australia) P Tramacchi | 7^{8} | 6^{2} | 4
(Belarus) M Mirnyi (Federal Republic of Yugoslavia) N Zimonjić | 4 | 6 | 4
6 | (Zimbabwe) W Black (Zimbabwe) K Ullyett | 6 | 4 | 6

Semifinals
(United States) J Stark (Philippines) E Taino | 7^{9} | 6
6 | (Zimbabwe) W Black (Zimbabwe) K Ullyett | 6^{7} | 1

=== Bottom half ===
First round
5 | (Canada) S Lareau (Canada) D Nestor | 6 | 5 | 7
(South Africa) M Barnard (South Africa) C Haggard | 4 | 7 | 5
WC | (France) S Grosjean (France) F Santoro | 6^{6} | 3
(South Africa) N Godwin (Australia) M Hill | 7^{8} | 6
(South Africa) J Coetzee (South Africa) B Haygarth | 7^{7} | 2 | 6
WC | (France) M Llodra (Russia) M Safin | 6^{4} | 6 | 3
8 | (Australia) W Arthurs (Croatia) G Ivanišević | 6 | 6
(South Africa) L Bale (Sweden) J Landsberg | 1 | 1
(United States) B Bryan (United States) M Bryan | 7^{7} | 6
WC | (Australia) L Hewitt (Sweden) A Vinciguerra | 6^{2} | 4
WC | (Sweden) T Enqvist (United Kingdom) G Rusedski | 6 | 6
(Australia) M Tebbutt (Belgium) T Vanhoudt | 2 | 4

Second round
5 | (Canada) S Lareau (Canada) D Nestor | 6 | 4 | 7
(South Africa) N Godwin (Australia) M Hill | 3 | 6 | 5
(South Africa) J Coetzee (South Africa) B Haygarth | 2 | 7 | 7^{7}
4 | (Zimbabwe) W Black (United States) J Gimelstob | 6 | 5 | 6^{5}
8 | (Australia) W Arthurs (Croatia) G Ivanišević | 3 | 4
(United States) B Bryan (United States) M Bryan | 6 | 6
WC | (Sweden) T Enqvist (United Kingdom) G Rusedski | 7^{7} | 3 | 4
2 | (Australia) T Woodbridge (Australia) M Woodforde | 6^{3} | 6 | 6

Quarterfinals
5 | (Canada) S Lareau (Canada) D Nestor | 7^{7} | 6
(South Africa) J Coetzee (South Africa) B Haygarth | 6^{2} | 4
(United States) B Bryan (United States) M Bryan | 7^{7} | 4 | 4
2 | (Australia) T Woodbridge (Australia) M Woodforde | 6^{3} | 6 | 6

Semifinals
5 | (Canada) S Lareau (Canada) D Nestor | 6^{5} | 3
2 | (Australia) T Woodbridge (Australia) M Woodforde | 7^{7} | 6
