= 1999 Stella Artois Championships – Doubles =

Doubles
- 1999 Stella Artois Championships

Final
- Champions: (Canada) Sébastien Lareau (United States) Alex O'Brien
- Runners-up: (Australia) Todd Woodbridge (United States) Mark Woodforde
- Score: 6–3, 7–6^{(7–3)}

Details
- Draw: 28

Events
Singles	Doubles
← 1998 ·	Queen's Club Championships	· 2000 →

Sébastien Lareau and Alex O'Brien won in the final 6–3, 7–6^{(7–3)} against Todd Woodbridge and Mark Woodforde.

== Seeds ==
The top four seeded teams received byes into the second round.

1. (India) Mahesh Bhupathi / (India) Leander Paes (quarterfinals)
2. (Australia) Todd Woodbridge / (Australia) Mark Woodforde (final)
3. (Zimbabwe) Wayne Black / (Australia) Sandon Stolle (second round)
4. (Czech Republic) Martin Damm / (Czech Republic) Cyril Suk (second round)
5. (Canada) Sébastien Lareau / (United States) Alex O'Brien (champions)
6. (United States) Jim Grabb / (United States) Donald Johnson (first round)
7. (Australia) Wayne Arthurs / (Australia) Andrew Kratzmann (semifinals)
8. (Russia) Yevgeny Kafelnikov / (Belarus) Max Mirnyi (second round)

== Draw ==
=== Key ===
- Q = Qualifier
- WC = Wild card
- LL = Lucky loser
- Alt = Alternate
- SE = Special exempt
- PR = Protected ranking
- ITF = ITF entry
- JE = Junior exempt
- w/o = Walkover
- r = Retired
- d = Defaulted
- SR = Special ranking

=== Finals ===
Semifinals
7	(Australia) Wayne Arthurs (Australia) Andrew Kratzmann	5	4
5	(Canada) Sébastien Lareau (United States) Alex O'Brien	7	6
WC	(Croatia) Goran Ivanišević (Australia) Mark Philippoussis	4	3
2	(Australia) Todd Woodbridge (Australia) Mark Woodforde	6	6

Final
5	(Canada) Sébastien Lareau (United States) Alex O'Brien	6	7^{7}
2	(Australia) Todd Woodbridge (Australia) Mark Woodforde	3	6^{3}

=== Top half ===
First round
Q	(Venezuela) M Ruah (Brazil) A Sá	6	6
(United States) B Coupe (The Bahamas) M Merklein	2	4
(South Africa) L Bale (South Africa) G Stafford	3	6
(United States) B MacPhie (United States) J Tarango	6	7
(New Zealand) J Greenhalgh (Federal Republic of Yugoslavia) N Zimonjić	3	4
7	(Australia) W Arthurs (Australia) A Kratzmann	6	6
(South Africa) M Barnard (South Africa) B Haygarth	2	6	6
(Zimbabwe) B Black (South Africa) W Ferreira	6	4	7
(France) F Santoro (Italy) L Tieleman	6	4	3
(United States) T. J. Middleton (Australia) M Tebbutt	4	6	6
(Mexico) D Roditi (United States) M Sell	2	6	1
5	(Canada) S Lareau (United States) A O'Brien	6	2	6

Second round
1	(India) M Bhupathi (India) L Paes	6	6
Q	(Venezuela) M Ruah (Brazil) A Sá	2	4
(United States) B MacPhie (United States) J Tarango	2	2
7	(Australia) W Arthurs (Australia) A Kratzmann	6	6
4	(Czech Republic) M Damm (Czech Republic) C Suk	6	0
(Zimbabwe) B Black (South Africa) W Ferreira	7	6
(United States) T. J. Middleton (Australia) M Tebbutt	2	6
5	(Canada) S Lareau (United States) A O'Brien	6	7

Quarterfinals
1	(India) M Bhupathi (India) L Paes	3	6
7	(Australia) W Arthurs (Australia) A Kratzmann	6	7
(Zimbabwe) B Black (South Africa) W Ferreira	4	3
5	(Canada) S Lareau (United States) A O'Brien	6	6

Semifinals
7	(Australia) W Arthurs (Australia) A Kratzmann	5	4
5	(Canada) S Lareau (United States) A O'Brien	7	6

=== Bottom half ===
First round
6	(United States) J Grabb (United States) D Johnson	4	6	2
WC	(Croatia) G Ivanišević (Australia) M Philippoussis	6	4	6
(United Kingdom) T Henman (United Kingdom) N Broad	6	6	4
(United States) J Courier (The Bahamas) M Knowles	4	7	6
WC	(Sweden) T Enqvist (Sweden) M Tillström	2	6	5
(United States) S Humphries (United States) J Waite	6	3	7
8	(Russia) Y Kafelnikov (Belarus) M Mirnyi	6	7
(United States) B Bryan (United States) M Bryan	3	5
Q	(Australia) B Ellwood (Australia) M Hill	6	6
WC	(Germany) B Becker (United States) P Sampras	4	4
WC	(United States) J-M Gambill (Australia) L Hewitt	6	3	6
(Australia) P Tramacchi (Czech Republic) P Vízner	1	6	4

Second round
WC	(Croatia) G Ivanišević (Australia) M Philippoussis	7	6
(United States) J Courier (The Bahamas) M Knowles	6	4
(United States) S Humphries (United States) J Waite	4	6	6
3	(Zimbabwe) B Black (Australia) S Stolle	6	3	4
8	(Russia) Y Kafelnikov (Belarus) M Mirnyi	3	4
Q	(Australia) B Ellwood (Australia) M Hill	6	6
WC	(United States) J-M Gambill (Australia) L Hewitt	3	2
2	(Australia) T Woodbridge (Australia) M Woodforde	6	6

Quarterfinals
WC	(Croatia) G Ivanišević (Australia) M Philippoussis	6	7
(United States) S Humphries (United States) J Waite	3	6
Q	(Australia) B Ellwood (Australia) M Hill	4	3
2	(Australia) T Woodbridge (Australia) M Woodforde	6	6

Semifinals
WC	(Croatia) G Ivanišević (Australia) M Philippoussis	4	3
2	(Australia) T Woodbridge (Australia) M Woodforde	6	6
