= 1997 Nottingham Open =

- Date: 16–22 June
- Edition: 8th
- Category: World Series
- Draw: 32S / 16D
- Prize money: $303,000
- Surface: Grass / outdoor
- Location: Nottingham, United Kingdom

Champions

Singles
- (United Kingdom) Greg Rusedski

Doubles
- (South Africa) Ellis Ferreira / (United States) Patrick Galbraith
← 1996 ·	Nottingham Open	· 1998 →

The 1997 Nottingham Open was an ATP tournament held in Nottingham, Great Britain that was part of the World Series of the 1997 ATP Tour. It was the eighth edition of the tournament and was held from 16 June to 22 June 1997.

Greg Rusedski won his first title of the year and the sixth of his career.

== Finals ==
=== Singles ===
(United Kingdom) Greg Rusedski defeated (Slovakia) Karol Kučera, 6–4, 7–5

=== Doubles ===
(South Africa) Ellis Ferreira / (United States) Patrick Galbraith defeated (United Kingdom) Danny Sapsford / (United Kingdom) Chris Wilkinson, 4–6, 7–6, 7–6
