= 1999 Nottingham Open – Singles =

Singles
- 1999 Nottingham Open

Final
- Champion: (France) Cédric Pioline
- Runner-up: (Zimbabwe) Kevin Ullyett
- Score: 6–3, 7–5

Details
- Draw: 32 (3WC/4Q)
- Seeds: 8

Events
Singles	Doubles
← 1998 ·	Nottingham Open	· 2000 →

Jonas Björkman was the defending champion, but chose to compete at the 1999 Heineken Trophy during the same week, losing in the second round.

Cédric Pioline defeated qualifier Kevin Ullyett 6–3, 7–5 in the final to secure the title.

== Seeds ==
1. (United Kingdom) Greg Rusedski (semifinals)
2. (France) Jérôme Golmard (second round)
3. (United States) Vincent Spadea (first round)
4. (France) Sébastien Grosjean (second round)
5. (Switzerland) Marc Rosset (first round)
6. (Zimbabwe) Byron Black (first round)
7. (Australia) Lleyton Hewitt (quarterfinals)
8. (Australia) Scott Draper (first round)

== Draw ==
=== Key ===
- Q = Qualifier
- WC = Wild card
- LL = Lucky loser
- Alt = Alternate
- SE = Special exempt
- PR = Protected ranking
- ITF = ITF entry
- JE = Junior exempt
- w/o = Walkover
- r = Retired
- d = Defaulted
- SR = Special ranking

=== Finals ===
Semifinals
1	(United Kingdom) Greg Rusedski	4	6^{4}
WC	(France) Cédric Pioline	6	7^{7}
(Germany) David Prinosil	6^{4}	6^{7}
Q	(Zimbabwe) Kevin Ullyett	7^{7}	7^{9}

Final
WC	(France) Cédric Pioline	6	7
Q	(Zimbabwe) Kevin Ullyett	3	5

=== Section 1 ===
First round
1	(United Kingdom) G Rusedski	6	6
(Italy) G Pozzi	0	0
(United States) J Gambill	7^{7}	6
(United States) C Woodruff	6^{1}	4
(Australia) M Woodforde	6	5	3
(Argentina) G Cañas	1	7	6
(France) A Clément	6^{4}	6	2
7	(Australia) L Hewitt	7^{7}	4	6
4	(France) S Grosjean	6	6
(Armenia) S Sargsian	2	4
(Australia) R Fromberg	7^{7}	3	5
WC	(France) C Pioline	6^{3}	6	7
(Australia) A Ilie	7^{7}	6^{5}	6
WC	(United Kingdom) C Wilkinson	6^{4}	7^{7}	4
(Paraguay) R Delgado	1	7^{7}	6
6	(Switzerland) M Rosset	6	6^{5}	3

Second round
1	(United Kingdom) G Rusedski	4	6	7
(United States) J Gambill	6	4	5
(Argentina) G Cañas	2	5
7	(Australia) L Hewitt	6	7
4	(France) S Grosjean	2	0
WC	(France) C Pioline	6	6
(Australia) A Ilie	6	6
(Paraguay) R Delgado	1	2

Quarterfinals
1	(United Kingdom) G Rusedski	6	7
7	(Australia) L Hewitt	4	5
WC	(France) C Pioline	6	6
(Australia) A Ilie	2	0

Semifinals
1	(United Kingdom) G Rusedski	4	6^{4}
WC	(France) C Pioline	6	7^{7}

=== Section 2 ===
First round
6	(Zimbabwe) B Black	4	6	2
WC	(United Kingdom) L Milligan	6	3	6
(Philippines) C Mamiit	4	6^{3}
(France) F Santoro	6	7^{7}
(Germany) D Prinosil	6	6
Q	(United States) D Johnson	3	4
(Italy) L Tieleman	1	6	6
3	(United States) V Spadea	6	3	4
8	(Australia) S Draper	4	6^{4}
Q	(Zimbabwe) K Ullyett	6	7^{7}
Q	(Zimbabwe) W Black	6	6
Q	(United Kingdom) B Cowan	3	3
(Sweden) M Norman	6^{4}	6	1
(Spain) A Martín	7^{7}	1	6
(United States) J Gimelstob	4	7^{7}	6^{5}
2	(France) J Golmard	6	6^{5}	7^{7}

Second round
WC	(United Kingdom) L Milligan	4	2
(France) F Santoro	6	6
(Germany) D Prinosil	6	6
(Italy) L Tieleman	3	3
Q	(Zimbabwe) K Ullyett	6	6
Q	(Zimbabwe) W Black	4	2
(Spain) A Martín	w/o
2	(France) J Golmard

Quarterfinals
(France) F Santoro	6	3	2
(Germany) D Prinosil	4	6	6
Q	(Zimbabwe) K Ullyett	6	6
(Spain) A Martín	2	1

Semifinals
(Germany) D Prinosil	6^{4}	6^{7}
Q	(Zimbabwe) K Ullyett	7^{7}	7^{9}

== Qualifying ==
=== Qualifying seeds ===
1. (Zimbabwe) Wayne Black (qualified)
2. (Switzerland) Roger Federer (second round)
3. (Japan) Takao Suzuki (qualifying competition)
4. (United States) Bob Bryan (second round)
5. (United Kingdom) Barry Cowan (qualified)
6. (United Kingdom) Miles Maclagan (second round)
7. (United Kingdom) Jamie Delgado (second round)
8. (United Kingdom) Martin Lee (qualifying competition)

=== Qualifiers ===
1. (Zimbabwe) Wayne Black
2. (United States) Donald Johnson
3. (United Kingdom) Barry Cowan
4. (Zimbabwe) Kevin Ullyett

=== Qualifying draw ===
==== First qualifier ====
First round
1	(Zimbabwe) Wayne Black	6	6
(United States) Mike Bryan	4	2
(United Kingdom) Graeme Darlington	4	3
(South Africa) Piet Norval	6	6
(United States) Jack Waite	4	3
(Australia) Grant Silcock	6	6
(United Kingdom) Kyle Spencer	6	1	2
8	(United Kingdom) Martin Lee	2	6	6

Second round
1	(Zimbabwe) Wayne Black	6	6
(South Africa) Piet Norval	3	4
(Australia) Grant Silcock	6	6	1
8	(United Kingdom) Martin Lee	7	4	6

Qualifying competition
1	(Zimbabwe) Wayne Black	6	6
8	(United Kingdom) Martin Lee	1	3

==== Second qualifier ====
First round
2	(Switzerland) Roger Federer	6	6
(United Kingdom) Ben Haran	1	1
(United States) Donald Johnson	6	6
(United Kingdom) Tom Spinks	1	4
WC	(United Kingdom) Paul Maggs	5	4
(United States) Jim Thomas	7	6
(United Kingdom) Oliver Freelove	6	3	4
7	(United Kingdom) Jamie Delgado	1	6	6

Second round
2	(Switzerland) Roger Federer	3	2
(United States) Donald Johnson	6	6
(United States) Jim Thomas	6	7
7	(United Kingdom) Jamie Delgado	1	6

Qualifying competition
(United States) Donald Johnson	7	7
(United States) Jim Thomas	6	6

==== Third qualifier ====
First round
3	(Japan) Takao Suzuki	6	6
(United Kingdom) Rhys Hanger	4	1
(United States) T. J. Middleton	3	3
(Sweden) Fredrik Lovén	6	6
WC	(United Kingdom) Alex Osterrieth	3	3
(United States) Mark Merklein	6	6
(Argentina) Pablo Albano	4	6
5	(United Kingdom) Barry Cowan	6	7

Second round
3	(Japan) Takao Suzuki	6	6
(Sweden) Fredrik Lovén	2	3
(United States) Mark Merklein	6	6	3
5	(United Kingdom) Barry Cowan	2	7	6

Qualifying competition
3	(Japan) Takao Suzuki	4	4
5	(United Kingdom) Barry Cowan	6	6

==== Fourth qualifier ====
First round
4	(United States) Bob Bryan	4	7	6
WC	(United Kingdom) James Smith	6	6	0
(Zimbabwe) Kevin Ullyett	6	6
WC	(United Kingdom) Adam Wharf	2	3
(United States) Jim Grabb	7	6
(United Kingdom) Arvind Parmar	6	3
(United States) Rob Givone	4	4
6	(United Kingdom) Miles Maclagan	6	6

Second round
4	(United States) Bob Bryan	4	6	3
(Zimbabwe) Kevin Ullyett	6	4	6
(United States) Jim Grabb	6	6	6
6	(United Kingdom) Miles Maclagan	7	3	4

Qualifying competition
(Zimbabwe) Kevin Ullyett	7	6
(United States) Jim Grabb	6	2
