= 1999 Nottingham Open =

- Date: 14–21 June
- Edition: 10th
- Category: ATP World Series
- Draw: 32S / 16D
- Prize money: $325,000
- Surface: Grass / outdoor
- Location: Nottingham, United Kingdom

Champions

Singles
- (France) Cédric Pioline

Doubles
- (United States) Patrick Galbraith / (United States) Justin Gimelstob
← 1998 ·	Nottingham Open	· 2000 →

The 1999 Nottingham Open was an ATP tournament held in Nottingham, Great Britain. The tournament was part of the ATP World Series of the 1999 ATP Tour and was held from 14 to 21 June 1999.

Cédric Pioline won his only title of the year and the fourth of his career.

== Finals ==
=== Singles ===
(France) Cédric Pioline defeated (Zimbabwe) Kevin Ullyett, 6–3, 7–5

=== Doubles ===
(United States) Patrick Galbraith / (United States) Justin Gimelstob defeated (South Africa) Marius Barnard / (South Africa) Brent Haygarth, 5–7, 7–5, 6–3
