= 1999 Stella Artois Championships – Singles =

Singles
- 1999 Stella Artois Championships

Final
- Champion: (United States) Pete Sampras
- Runner-up: (United Kingdom) Tim Henman
- Score: 6–7^{(1–7)}, 6–4, 7–6^{(7–4)}

Details
- Draw: 56
- Seeds: 16

Events
Singles	Doubles
← 1998 ·	Queen's Club Championships	· 2000 →

Scott Draper was the defending champion but lost in the third round to Sargis Sargsian.

Pete Sampras won in the final 6–7^{(1–7)}, 6–4, 7–6^{(7–4)} against Tim Henman.

This was the only year in which Roger Federer competed in this tournament.

== Seeds ==
The top eight seeds received a bye to the second round.

1. (Russia) Yevgeny Kafelnikov (second round)
2. (United States) Pete Sampras (champion)
3. (United Kingdom) Tim Henman (final)
4. (Australia) Mark Philippoussis (third round)
5. (United States) Todd Martin (third round)
6. (Slovakia) Karol Kučera (quarterfinals)
7. (United Kingdom) Greg Rusedski (quarterfinals)
8. (Croatia) Goran Ivanišević (quarterfinals)
9. (Sweden) Thomas Enqvist (first round)
10. (South Africa) Wayne Ferriera (third round)
11. (France) Cédric Pioline (quarterfinals)
12. (Australia) Jason Stoltenberg (third round)
13. (Zimbabwe) Byron Black (third round)
14. (Australia) Lleyton Hewitt (semifinals)
15. (Australia) Scott Draper (third round)
16. (France) Fabrice Santoro (first round)

== Draw ==
=== Key ===
- Q = Qualifier
- WC = Wild card
- LL = Lucky loser
- Alt = Alternate
- SE = Special exempt
- PR = Protected ranking
- ITF = ITF entry
- JE = Junior exempt
- w/o = Walkover
- r = Retired
- d = Defaulted
- SR = Special ranking

=== Finals ===
Semifinals
(Armenia) Sargis Sargsian	1	3
3	(United Kingdom) Tim Henman	6	6
14	(Australia) Lleyton Hewitt	6	4	6^{4}
WC/2	(United States) Pete Sampras	4	6	7^{7}

Final
3	(United Kingdom) Tim Henman	7^{7}	4	6^{4}
WC/2	(United States) Pete Sampras	6^{1}	6	7^{7}

=== Top half ===
==== Section 1 ====
First round
(Armenia) S Sargsian	6	6
(Czech Republic) M Damm	3	1
(Czech Republic) P Korda	4	4
(Germany) B Becker	6	6
Q	(United States) O Motevassel	6^{3}	6^{7}
15	(Australia) S Draper	7^{7}	7^{9}
10	(South Africa) W Ferreira	3	7	6
(Italy) L Tieleman	6	5	1
(France) A Dupuis	5	1
(United States) J Tarango	7	6
(United States) P Goldstein	6	7
Q	(Japan) G Motomura	3	5

Second round
1	(Russia) Y Kafelnikov	6	3	3
(Armenia) S Sargsian	3	6	6
(Germany) B Becker	6^{3}	3
15	(Australia) S Draper	7^{7}	6
10	(South Africa) W Ferreira	6^{5}	6	6
(United States) J Tarango	7^{7}	4	2
(United States) P Goldstein	3	4
7	(United Kingdom) G Rusedski	6	6

Third round
(Armenia) S Sargsian	6	6
15	(Australia) S Draper	3	2
10	(South Africa) W Ferreira	5	6	3
7	(United Kingdom) G Rusedski	7	4	6

Quarterfinals
(Armenia) S Sargsian	6	6
7	(United Kingdom) G Rusedski	2	4

==== Section 2 ====
First round
(Philippines) C Mamiit	6	6
(Germany) A Pretzsch	3	4
(France) A Clément	4
(France) N Escudé	0^{r}
(Switzerland) R Federer	3	0
13	(Zimbabwe) B Black	6	6
12	(Australia) J Stoltenberg	6	6
(Zimbabwe) W Black	3	4
(Sweden) M Tillström	7^{9}	6^{4}	4
Q	(United Kingdom) M Lee	6^{7}	7^{7}	6
(Denmark) K Carlsen	2	6	1
WC	(United States) J Courier	6	4	6

Second round
3	(United Kingdom) T Henman	6	7^{8}
(Philippines) C Mamiit	3	6^{6}
(France) A Clément	4	3
13	(Zimbabwe) B Black	6	6
12	(Australia) J Stoltenberg	7^{7}	6
Q	(United Kingdom) M Lee	6^{1}	1
WC	(United States) J Courier	6	4	1
6	(Slovakia) K Kučera	3	6	6

Third round
3	(United Kingdom) T Henman	6	6
13	(Zimbabwe) B Black	1	4
12	(Australia) J Stoltenberg	3	3
6	(Slovakia) K Kučera	6	6

Quarterfinals
3	(United Kingdom) T Henman	6	6^{6}	7^{7}
6	(Slovakia) K Kučera	1	7^{8}	6^{5}

=== Bottom half ===
==== Section 3 ====
First round
(Australia) R Fromberg	7	7^{4}
WC	(Sweden) M Norman	5	6^{4}
(Netherlands) D van Scheppingen	6	2	4
(Australia) M Woodforde	3	6	6
(Italy) M Navarra	6^{2}	6	1
11	(France) C Pioline	7^{7}	3	6
14	(Australia) L Hewitt	7^{7}	3	6
(Italy) D Nargiso	6^{2}	6	2
WC	(United Kingdom) C Wilkinson	4	7^{7}	6
(Japan) T Suzuki	6	6^{5}	1
(United States) J-M Gambill	6	6
Q	(United States) M Sell	4	2

Second round
6	(United States) T Martin	7^{8}	7^{7}
(Australia) R Fromberg	6^{6}	6^{4}
(Australia) M Woodforde	4	5
11	(France) C Pioline	6	7
14	(Australia) L Hewitt	6	6
WC	(United Kingdom) C Wilkinson	4	3
(United States) J-M Gambill	6	3	4
4	(Australia) M Philippoussis	2	6	6

Third round
6	(United States) T Martin	6	3	5
11	(France) C Pioline	1	6	7
14	(Australia) L Hewitt	6^{4}	6	6
4	(Australia) M Philippoussis	7^{7}	3	2

Quarterfinals
11	(France) C Pioline	5	4
14	(Australia) L Hewitt	7	6

==== Section 4 ====
First round
(Bulgaria) O Stanoytchev	4	6	6
(Netherlands) P Wessels	6	2	4
(Canada) S Lareau	6	6
WC	(United Kingdom) B Cowan	4	2
(Germany) M Kohlmann	6	6
9	(Sweden) T Enqvist	4	4
16	(France) F Santoro	3	6^{6}
Q	(Australia) P Tramacchi	6	7^{8}
Q	(Australia) W Arthurs	7	6
Q	(United Kingdom) A Parmar	5	2
(Netherlands) R Wassen	2	1
(Australia) T Woodbridge	6	6

Second round
8	(Croatia) G Ivanišević	6	6
(Bulgaria) O Stanoytchev	4	4
(Canada) S Lareau	6	4	6
(Germany) M Kohlmann	1	6	4
Q	(Australia) P Tramacchi	3	4
Q	(Australia) W Arthurs	6	6
(Australia) T Woodbridge	4	7^{8}	4
WC/2	(United States) P Sampras	6	6^{6}	6

Third round
8	(Croatia) G Ivanišević	6	6^{3}	6
(Canada) S Lareau	4	7^{7}	4
Q	(Australia) W Arthurs	5	3
WC/2	(United States) P Sampras	7	6

Quarterfinals
8	(Croatia) G Ivanišević	5	4
WC/2	(United States) P Sampras	7	6
