= 1998 Nottingham Open – Doubles =

Doubles
- 1998 Nottingham Open

Final
- Champions: (United States) Justin Gimelstob (South Africa) Byron Talbot
- Runners-up: (Canada) Sébastien Lareau (Canada) Daniel Nestor
- Score: 7–5, 6–7, 6–4

Details
- Draw: 16
- Seeds: 4

Events
Singles	Doubles
- Nottingham Open

Ellis Ferreira and Patrick Galbraith were the defending champions, but did not partner together this year. Ferreira partnered Rick Leach, losing in the first round. Galbraith partnered Brett Steven, losing in the first round.

Justin Gimelstob and Byron Talbot won the title, defeating Sébastien Lareau and Daniel Nestor 7–5, 6–7, 6–4 in the final.

== Seeds ==
1. (South Africa) Ellis Ferreira / (United States) Rick Leach (first round)
2. (United States) Patrick Galbraith / (New Zealand) Brett Steven (first round)
3. (Canada) Sébastien Lareau / (Canada) Daniel Nestor (final)
4. (Australia) David Macpherson / (United States) Richey Reneberg (first round)

== Draw ==
Key

- Q = Qualifier
- WC = Wild card
- LL = Lucky loser
- Alt = Alternate
- ITF = ITF entry
- PR = Protected ranking
- SR = Special ranking
- SE = Special exempt
- JE = Junior exempt
- JR = Junior Accelerator Programme entrant
- CO = College Accelerator Programme entrant
- NG = Next Gen Accelerator Program entrant
- w/o = Walkover
- r = Retired
- d = Defaulted

=== Draw ===
First round
1	(South Africa) E Ferreira (United States) R Leach	4	3
(South Africa) J-L de Jager (Germany) M-K Goellner	6	6
(United States) M Keil (United States) TJ Middleton	6	6
WC	(United Kingdom) B Cowan (United Kingdom) M Petchey	1	4
3	(Canada) S Lareau (Canada) D Nestor	7	2	6
(United Kingdom) N Broad (South Africa) P Norval	5	6	3
WC	(Spain) J Burillo (Spain) F Mantilla	5	2
(United States) K Kinnear (United States) D Randall	7	6
(United Kingdom) D Sapsford (United Kingdom) C Wilkinson	2	3
(South Africa) D Adams (Zimbabwe) W Black	6	6
(Australia) A Kratzmann (South Africa) G Stafford	6	2	7
4	(Australia) D Macpherson (United States) R Reneberg	3	6	5
(South Africa) M Barnard (Germany) D Prinosil	6	6
WC	(Ecuador) N Lapentti (Chile) M Ríos	2	1
Q	(United States) J Gimelstob (South Africa) B Talbot	3	6	6
2	(United States) P Galbraith (New Zealand) B Steven	6	3	4

Quarterfinals
(South Africa) J-L de Jager (Germany) M-K Goellner	6	6	6
(United States) M Keil (United States) TJ Middleton	3	7	7
3	(Canada) S Lareau (Canada) D Nestor	6	6	6
(United States) K Kinnear (United States) D Randall	7	4	4
(South Africa) D Adams (Zimbabwe) W Black	4	6
(Australia) A Kratzmann (South Africa) G Stafford	6	7
(South Africa) M Barnard (Germany) D Prinosil	4	4
Q	(United States) J Gimelstob (South Africa) B Talbot	6	6

Semifinals
(United States) M Keil (United States) TJ Middleton	3	3
3	(Canada) S Lareau (Canada) D Nestor	6	6
(Australia) A Kratzmann (South Africa) G Stafford	6	4	3
Q	(United States) J Gimelstob (South Africa) B Talbot	4	6	6

Final
3	(Canada) S Lareau (Canada) D Nestor	5	7	4
Q	(United States) J Gimelstob (South Africa) B Talbot	7	6	6
