= 2000 Nottingham Open – Doubles =

Doubles
- 2000 Nottingham Open

Final
- Champions: (United States) Donald Johnson (South Africa) Piet Norval
- Runners-up: (South Africa) Ellis Ferreira (United States) Rick Leach
- Score: 1–6, 6–4, 6–3

Details
- Draw: 16
- Seeds: 4

Events
| Singles | Doubles |
- Nottingham Open

Patrick Galbraith and Justin Gimelstob were the defending champions, but did not partner together this year. Galbraith partnered Brian MacPhie, losing in the quarterfinals. Gimelstob partnered Jared Palmer, losing in the first round.

Donald Johnson and Piet Norval won the title, defeating Ellis Ferreira and Rick Leach 1–6, 6–4, 6–3 in the final.

== Seeds ==
1. (South Africa) Ellis Ferreira / (United States) Rick Leach (final)
2. (Sweden) Jonas Björkman / (Zimbabwe) Byron Black (first round)
3. (United States) Justin Gimelstob / (United States) Jared Palmer (first round)
4. (South Africa) David Adams / (South Africa) John-Laffnie de Jager (semifinals)

== Draw ==
Key

- Q = Qualifier
- WC = Wild card
- LL = Lucky loser
- Alt = Alternate
- ITF = ITF entry
- PR = Protected ranking
- SR = Special ranking
- SE = Special exempt
- JE = Junior exempt
- JR = Junior Accelerator Programme entrant
- CO = College Accelerator Programme entrant
- NG = Next Gen Accelerator Program entrant
- w/o = Walkover
- r = Retired
- d = Defaulted

=== Draw ===
First round
1 | (South Africa) E Ferreira (United States) R Leach | 6 | 6^{5} | 7^{7}
(France) O Delaître (France) F Santoro | 3 | 7^{7} | 6^{5}
WC | (United Kingdom) B Cowan (United Kingdom) K Spencer | 6^{4} | 4
(United States) P Galbraith (United States) B MacPhie | 7^{7} | 6
4 | (South Africa) D Adams (South Africa) J-L de Jager | 6 | 6
Q | (France) A Clément (France) S Grosjean | 2 | 0
WC | (United Kingdom) J Delgado (United Kingdom) M Lee | 4 | 5
(South Africa) B Haygarth (Sweden) J Landsberg | 6 | 7
(South Africa) M Barnard (South Africa) C Haggard | 6 | 4 | 6
(Switzerland) R Federer (Australia) A Kratzmann | 3 | 6 | 4
(United States) D Johnson (South Africa) P Norval | 6 | 6
3 | (United States) J Gimelstob (United States) J Palmer | 3 | 4
(South Africa) R Koenig (Russia) A Olhovskiy | 3 | 6 | 3
WC | (United Kingdom) N Broad (United Kingdom) A Parmar | 6 | 3 | 6
(United States) J-M Gambill (United States) S Humphries | 6 | 3 | 6
2 | (Sweden) J Björkman (Zimbabwe) B Black | 3 | 6 | 3

Quarterfinals
1 | (South Africa) E Ferreira (United States) R Leach | 6 | 6^{1} | 7
(United States) P Galbraith (United States) B MacPhie | 3 | 7^{7} | 5
4 | (South Africa) D Adams (South Africa) J-L de Jager | 5 | 7^{7} | 6
(South Africa) B Haygarth (Sweden) J Landsberg | 7 | 6^{2} | 3
(South Africa) M Barnard (South Africa) C Haggard | 6^{2} | 7^{9} | 3
(United States) D Johnson (South Africa) P Norval | 7^{7} | 6^{7} | 6
WC | (United Kingdom) N Broad (United Kingdom) A Parmar | 3 | 7^{7} | 7^{10}
(United States) J-M Gambill (United States) S Humphries | 6 | 6^{4} | 6^{8}

Semifinals
1 | (South Africa) E Ferreira (United States) R Leach | 7^{7} | 6
4 | (South Africa) D Adams (South Africa) J-L de Jager | 6^{2} | 2
(United States) D Johnson (South Africa) P Norval | 6 | 3 | 6
WC | (United Kingdom) N Broad (United Kingdom) A Parmar | 4 | 6 | 3

Final
1 | (South Africa) E Ferreira (United States) R Leach | 6 | 4 | 3
(United States) D Johnson (South Africa) P Norval | 1 | 6 | 6
