= 1993 Wimbledon Championships – Men's doubles =

Men's doubles
- 1993 Wimbledon Championships

Final
- Champions: (Australia) Todd Woodbridge (Australia) Mark Woodforde
- Runners-up: (Canada) Grant Connell (United States) Patrick Galbraith
- Score: 7–5, 6–3, 7–6^{(7–4)}

Details
- Draw: 64 (5 Q / 6 WC )
- Seeds: 16

Events
Singles	men	women		boys	girls
Doubles	men	women	mixed	boys	girls
WC Singles	men	women	quad
WC Doubles	men	women	quad
Legends	men	women	seniors
← 1992 ·	Wimbledon Championships	· 1994 →

Todd Woodbridge and Mark Woodforde defeated Grant Connell and Patrick Galbraith in the final, 7–5, 6–3, 7–6^{(7–4)} to win the gentlemen's doubles title at the 1993 Wimbledon Championships. It was the Woodies' first Wimbledon title, their second major title overall, and their second step towards the career Super Slam.

John McEnroe and Michael Stich were the reigning champions, but McEnroe did not compete this year. Stich partnered Wayne Ferreira, but was defeated in the third round by Jeremy Bates and Byron Black.

== Seeds ==
1. (Australia) Todd Woodbridge / (Australia) Mark Woodforde (champions)
2. (Australia) John Fitzgerald / (Sweden) Anders Järryd (second round)
3. (United States) Patrick McEnroe / (United States) Jonathan Stark (quarterfinals)
4. (Australia) Mark Kratzmann / (Australia) Wally Masur (second round)
5. (Canada) Grant Connell / (United States) Patrick Galbraith (final)
6. (South Africa) Danie Visser / (Australia) Laurie Warder (third round)
7. (Netherlands) Jacco Eltingh / (Netherlands) Mark Koevermans (first round)
8. (United States) Steve DeVries / (Australia) David Macpherson (first round)
9. (United States) Luke Jensen / (United States) Murphy Jensen (second round)
10. (South Africa) Wayne Ferreira / (Germany) Michael Stich (third round)
11. (Spain) Sergio Casal / (Switzerland) Jakob Hlasek (first round)
12. (United States) Ken Flach / (United States) Rick Leach (second round)
13. (United States) Shelby Cannon / (United States) Scott Melville (second round)
14. (South Africa) David Adams / (Russia) Andrei Olhovskiy (second round, withdrew)
15. (United States) Richey Reneberg / (United States) David Wheaton (second round)
16. (Canada) Glenn Michibata / (United States) David Pate (second round)

Click on the seed number of a player to go to their draw section.

== Draw ==
=== Key ===
- Q = Qualifier
- WC = Wild card
- LL = Lucky loser
- Alt = Alternate
- ITF = ITF entry
- PR = Protected ranking
- SR = Special ranking
- SE = Special exempt
- JE = Junior exempt
- JR = Junior Accelerator Programme entrant
- CO = College Accelerator Programme entrant
- NG = Next Gen Accelerator Program entrant
- w/o = Walkover
- r = Retired
- d = Defaulted

=== Finals ===
Quarterfinals
1	(Australia) Todd Woodbridge (Australia) Mark Woodforde	6	6	6
(United Kingdom) Jeremy Bates (Zimbabwe) Byron Black	4	3	4
(Germany) Patrik Kühnen (South Africa) Gary Muller	6	6	7^{7}
(South Africa) Royce Deppe (The Bahamas) Mark Knowles	2	4	6^{3}
5	(Canada) Grant Connell (United States) Patrick Galbraith	4	6	6^{7}	7^{7}	6
3	(United States) Patrick McEnroe (United States) Jonathan Stark	6	3	7^{9}	6^{2}	4
WC	(United Kingdom) Paul Hand (United Kingdom) Chris Wilkinson	4	7^{7}	6	3	4
(Sweden) Rikard Bergh (South Africa) Byron Talbot	6	6^{5}	4	6	6

Semifinals
1	(Australia) Todd Woodbridge (Australia) Mark Woodforde	6	6	6
(Germany) Patrik Kühnen (South Africa) Gary Muller	4	4	4
5	(Canada) Grant Connell (United States) Patrick Galbraith	6	6	6
(Sweden) Rikard Bergh (South Africa) Byron Talbot	3	4	4

Final
1	(Australia) Todd Woodbridge (Australia) Mark Woodforde	7	6	7^{7}
5	(Canada) Grant Connell (United States) Patrick Galbraith	5	3	6^{4}

=== Top half ===
==== Section 1 ====
First round
1	(Australia) T Woodbridge (Australia) M Woodforde	7^{7}	6	6
(South Africa) M Barnard (Netherlands) S Groen	6^{4}	3	1
(Venezuela) N Pereira (United States) G Van Emburgh	3	7^{7}	4	7^{7}	6
(Australia) S Stolle (Australia) J Stoltenberg	6	6^{4}	6	6^{3}	2
(Netherlands) HJ Davids (South Africa) P Norval	6^{5}	7^{7}	6	6
WC	(United Kingdom) A Foster (United Kingdom) M Petchey	7^{7}	6^{4}	4	4
Q	(India) L Paes (Italy) L Tieleman	2	6^{4}	3
15	(United States) R Reneberg (United States) D Wheaton	6	7^{7}	6
10	(South Africa) W Ferreira (Germany) M Stich	6	3	7	6
(Sweden) H Holm (Norway) B-O Pedersen	1	6	5	1
Q	(Germany) A Rădulescu (Sweden) M Stadling	3	3	6^{2}
(South Africa) B Haygarth (United States) J Pugh	6	6	7^{7}
(United States) B Shelton (United States) T Witsken	6	6	6
WC	(United Kingdom) S Cole (United Kingdom) M Maclagan	4	0	4
(United Kingdom) J Bates (Zimbabwe) B Black	6	6	6
7	(Netherlands) J Eltingh (Netherlands) M Koevermans	2	1	4

Second round
1	(Australia) T Woodbridge (Australia) M Woodforde	6	6	6
(Venezuela) N Pereira (United States) G Van Emburgh	4	4	2
(Netherlands) HJ Davids (South Africa) P Norval	6	7	7^{7}
15	(United States) R Reneberg (United States) D Wheaton	4	5	6^{5}
10	(South Africa) W Ferreira (Germany) M Stich	6^{4}	6	6	7^{7}
(South Africa) B Haygarth (United States) J Pugh	7^{7}	2	2	6^{3}
(United States) B Shelton (United States) T Witsken	3	5	4
(United Kingdom) J Bates (Zimbabwe) B Black	6	7	6

Third round
1	(Australia) T Woodbridge (Australia) M Woodforde	2	6	6	6
(Netherlands) HJ Davids (South Africa) P Norval	6	3	4	2
10	(South Africa) W Ferreira (Germany) M Stich	6^{5}	6	6	5	1
(United Kingdom) J Bates (Zimbabwe) B Black	7^{7}	4	4	7	6

Quarterfinals
1	(Australia) T Woodbridge (Australia) M Woodforde	6	6	6
(United Kingdom) J Bates (Zimbabwe) B Black	4	3	4

==== Section 2 ====
First round
4	(Australia) M Kratzmann (Australia) W Masur	6	6	7^{7}
(Netherlands) M Oosting (Germany) U Riglewski	3	4	6^{5}
(France) A Boetsch (France) O Delaître	4	7^{7}	7^{7}	2	7
(Sweden) J Apell (Sweden) J Björkman	6	6^{5}	6^{5}	6	5
(Germany) P Kühnen (South Africa) G Muller	7^{7}	6	6
(United States) P Annacone (United States) K Jones	6^{3}	4	4
(United Kingdom) N Broad (South Africa) S Kruger	6^{4}	1	6	7^{7}	4
13	(United States) S Cannon (United States) S Melville	7^{7}	6	3	6^{2}	6
11	(Spain) S Casal (Switzerland) J Hlasek	6	6^{3}	6^{3}	6^{3}
(Czech Republic) C Suk (Czech Republic) D Vacek	4	7^{7}	7^{7}	7^{7}
(United States) F Montana (United States) K Thorne	3	2	7^{7}	6	3
(South Africa) R Deppe (The Bahamas) M Knowles	6	6	6^{3}	2	6
(United States) M Keil (United States) D Randall	6	4	6	7
(Czech Republic) M Damm (Czech Republic) K Nováček	3	6	4	5
(Sweden) R Båthman (Sweden) O Jonsson	3	6^{5}	4
6	(South Africa) D Visser (Australia) L Warder	6	7^{7}	6

Second round
4	(Australia) M Kratzmann (Australia) W Masur	4	6	6	5	5
(France) A Boetsch (France) O Delaître	6	1	4	7	7
(Germany) P Kühnen (South Africa) G Muller	7^{8}	6	7
13	(United States) S Cannon (United States) S Melville	6^{6}	4	5
(Czech Republic) C Suk (Czech Republic) D Vacek	4	6	6	6^{5}	4
(South Africa) R Deppe (The Bahamas) M Knowles	6	3	4	7^{7}	6
(United States) M Keil (United States) D Randall	4	6^{6}	7^{7}	6^{5}
6	(South Africa) D Visser (Australia) L Warder	6	7^{8}	6^{5}	7^{7}

Third round
(France) A Boetsch (France) O Delaître	7^{7}	5	6^{8}	5
(Germany) P Kühnen (South Africa) G Muller	6^{0}	7	7^{10}	7
(South Africa) R Deppe (The Bahamas) M Knowles	7^{7}	3	6	7^{7}
6	(South Africa) D Visser (Australia) L Warder	6^{0}	6	4	6^{3}

Quarterfinals
(Germany) P Kühnen (South Africa) G Muller	6	6	7^{7}
(South Africa) R Deppe (The Bahamas) M Knowles	2	4	6^{3}

=== Bottom half ===
==== Section 3 ====
First round
5	(Canada) G Connell (United States) P Galbraith	7	6	6
Q	(South Africa) L Bale (Australia) A Kratzmann	5	4	3
(Argentina) P Albano (Argentina) J Frana	7^{7}	6	6^{5}	6
Q	(Argentina) J Garat (Hungary) S Noszály	6^{2}	2	7^{7}	3
(Croatia) G Ivanišević (Switzerland) M Rosset	6	7^{9}	6
WC	(United Kingdom) R Matheson (United Kingdom) A Richardson	4	6^{7}	3
(United States) S Davis (United States) J Palmer	4	4	6^{4}
12	(United States) K Flach (United States) R Leach	6	6	7^{7}
14	(South Africa) D Adams (Russia) A Olhovskiy	7^{7}	7^{7}	6
(Italy) C Brandi (Cuba) M Tabares	6^{3}	6^{4}	2
(Czech Republic) V Flégl (Czech Republic) T Zdražila	3	3	2
Q	(United States) D DiLucia (United States) B MacPhie	6	6	6
(Denmark) M Mortensen (Sweden) T Svantesson	6^{6}	6^{3}	3
(Australia) N Borwick (Australia) S Youl	7^{8}	7^{7}	6
(Sweden) C Allgårdh (Venezuela) M Ruah	6	6^{6}	4	6	8
3	(United States) P McEnroe (United States) J Stark	3	7^{7}	6	3	10

Second round
5	(Canada) G Connell (United States) P Galbraith	6	4	6	6
(Argentina) P Albano (Argentina) J Frana	4	6	3	4
(Croatia) G Ivanišević (Switzerland) M Rosset	6	6	6^{11}	6
12	(United States) K Flach (United States) R Leach	3	4	7^{13}	3
14	(South Africa) D Adams (Russia) A Olhovskiy	w/o
Q	(United States) D DiLucia (United States) B MacPhie
(Australia) N Borwick (Australia) S Youl	4	3	4
3	(United States) P McEnroe (United States) J Stark	6	6	6

Third round
5	(Canada) G Connell (United States) P Galbraith	7^{7}	6^{4}	6	2	12
(Croatia) G Ivanišević (Switzerland) M Rosset	6^{0}	7^{7}	4	6	10
Q	(United States) D DiLucia (United States) B MacPhie	6^{4}	3	6^{2}
3	(United States) P McEnroe (United States) J Stark	7^{7}	6	7^{7}

Quarterfinals
5	(Canada) G Connell (United States) P Galbraith	4	6	6^{7}	7^{7}	6
3	(United States) P McEnroe (United States) J Stark	6	3	7^{9}	6^{2}	4

==== Section 4 ====
First round
8	(United States) S DeVries (Australia) D Macpherson	7^{7}	6^{1}	3	6	3
(United States) K Kinnear (Germany) C Saceanu	6^{5}	7^{7}	6	4	6
(Sweden) J Donar (Sweden) P Nyborg	6	4	3	5
(United States) B Garnett (United States) TJ Middleton	4	6	6	7
WC	(United Kingdom) P Hand (United Kingdom) C Wilkinson	4	6	6	6
(Belgium) L Pimek (New Zealand) B Steven	6	3	4	2
WC	(United Kingdom) C Bailey (United Kingdom) T Henman	6	6^{4}	6^{1}	3
9	(United States) L Jensen (United States) M Jensen	4	7^{7}	7^{7}	6
16	(Canada) G Michibata (United States) D Pate	3	6	7^{7}	7^{7}
(United States) M Briggs (United States) T Kronemann	6	1	6^{3}	6^{5}
(Sweden) R Bergh (South Africa) B Talbot	3	2	7^{7}	6	6
(United States) B Pearce (South Africa) C van Rensburg	6	6	6^{3}	2	2
(South Africa) J-L de Jager (South Africa) M Ondruska	6	6	6
(Netherlands) T Nijssen (Netherlands) J Siemerink	4	2	4
(United States) M Bauer (United States) T Nelson	4	4	3
2	(Australia) J Fitzgerald (Sweden) A Järryd	6	6	6

Second round
(United States) K Kinnear (Germany) C Saceanu	6^{6}	7^{7}	3	6	5
(United States) B Garnett (United States) TJ Middleton	7^{8}	6^{3}	6	3	7
WC	(United Kingdom) P Hand (United Kingdom) C Wilkinson	6	6^{8}	6	7^{9}
9	(United States) L Jensen (United States) M Jensen	4	7^{10}	3	6^{7}
16	(Canada) G Michibata (United States) D Pate	5	5	6^{7}
(Sweden) R Bergh (South Africa) B Talbot	7	7	7^{9}
(South Africa) J-L de Jager (South Africa) M Ondruska	6^{6}	6	6	7^{7}
2	(Australia) J Fitzgerald (Sweden) A Järryd	7^{8}	4	4	6^{1}

Third round
(United States) B Garnett (United States) TJ Middleton	4	7^{7}	3	6^{3}
WC	(United Kingdom) P Hand (United Kingdom) C Wilkinson	6	6^{5}	6	7^{7}
(Sweden) R Bergh (South Africa) B Talbot	2	6	6	6
(South Africa) J-L de Jager (South Africa) M Ondruska	6	1	4	3

Quarterfinals
WC	(United Kingdom) P Hand (United Kingdom) C Wilkinson	4	7^{7}	6	3	4
(Sweden) R Bergh (South Africa) B Talbot	6	6^{5}	4	6	6
