= 1997 Nottingham Open – Singles =

Singles
- 1997 Nottingham Open

Final
- Champion: (United Kingdom) Greg Rusedski
- Runner-up: (Slovakia) Karol Kučera
- Score: 6–4, 7–5

Details
- Draw: 32
- Seeds: 8

Events
| Singles | Doubles |
| ← 1996 · | Nottingham Open | · 1998 → |

Greg Rusedski defeated Karol Kučera 6–4, 7–5 in the final to secure the title.

== Seeds ==
1. (Spain) Carlos Moyá (first round)
2. (Chile) Marcelo Ríos (first round)
3. (Brazil) Gustavo Kuerten (first round)
4. (United Kingdom) Tim Henman (semifinals)
5. (Netherlands) Jan Siemerink (second round)
6. (United States) Jim Courier (second round)
7. (Australia) Todd Woodbridge (first round)
8. (United States) Alex O'Brien (quarterfinals)

== Draw ==
=== Key ===
- Q = Qualifier
- WC = Wild card
- LL = Lucky loser
- Alt = Alternate
- SE = Special exempt
- PR = Protected ranking
- ITF = ITF entry
- JE = Junior exempt
- w/o = Walkover
- r = Retired
- d = Defaulted
- SR = Special ranking

=== Finals ===
Semifinals
(Slovakia) Karol Kučera | 6 | 2 | 6
WC/4 | (United Kingdom) Tim Henman | 4 | 6 | 4
(United Kingdom) Greg Rusedski | 6 | 6
(Australia) Sandon Stolle | 3 | 4

Final
(Slovakia) Karol Kučera | 4 | 5
(United Kingdom) Greg Rusedski | 6 | 7

=== Section 1 ===
First round
1 | (Spain) C Moyá | 6 | 6^{8} | 4
(Romania) A Voinea | 1 | 7^{10} | 6
Q | (United States) J Gimelstob | 4 | 5
(Australia) S Draper | 6 | 7
(Slovakia) K Kučera | 6 | 6
Q | (United Kingdom) M Lee | 1 | 1
(Zimbabwe) B Black | 6 | 2 | 6
7 | (Australia) T Woodbridge | 2 | 6 | 2
WC/4 | (United Kingdom) T Henman | 6 | 6^{6} | 6
WC | (United Kingdom) A Richardson | 3 | 7^{8} | 4
(Armenia) S Sargsian | 6 | 3 | 6^{4}
(Australia) R Fromberg | 3 | 6 | 7^{7}
Q | (Canada) D Nestor | 1 | 6^{4}
(South Africa) G Stafford | 6 | 7^{7}
(Sweden) M Norman | 0 | 4
5 | (Netherlands) J Siemerink | 6 | 6

Second round
(Romania) A Voinea | 3 | 6 | 6^{3}
(Australia) S Draper | 6 | 2 | 7^{7}
(Slovakia) K Kučera | 7 | 6
(Zimbabwe) B Black | 5 | 3
WC/4 | (United Kingdom) T Henman | 6 | 6^{7} | 7^{7}
(Australia) R Fromberg | 4 | 7^{9} | 6^{4}
(South Africa) G Stafford | 5 | 6 | 6
5 | (Netherlands) J Siemerink | 7 | 4 | 2

Quarterfinals
(Australia) S Draper | 6 | 2 | 5
(Slovakia) K Kučera | 4 | 6 | 7
WC/4 | (United Kingdom) T Henman | 3 | 6 | 7^{8}
(South Africa) G Stafford | 6 | 3 | 6^{6}

Semifinals
(Slovakia) K Kučera | 6 | 2 | 6
WC/4 | (United Kingdom) T Henman | 4 | 6 | 4

=== Section 2 ===
First round
WC/6 | (United States) J Courier | 6 | 3 | 6
(Belgium) J Van Herck | 3 | 6 | 3
(Australia) J Stoltenberg | 6 | 6
(United States) J Tarango | 4 | 2
(United States) J Stark | 3 | 6^{4}
(Australia) M Woodforde | 6 | 7^{7}
(United Kingdom) G Rusedski | 6 | 7
3 | (Brazil) G Kuerten | 1 | 5
8 | (United States) A O'Brien | 6 | 6
(France) L Roux | 4 | 3
Q | (United Kingdom) C Wilkinson | 6^{3} | 4
(Germany) M Goellner | 7^{7} | 6
(France) A Boetsch | 3 | 6^{3}
(Australia) S Stolle | 6 | 7^{7}
(Denmark) K Carlsen | 6 | 6
2 | (Chile) M Ríos | 4 | 2

Second round
WC/6 | (United States) J Courier | 6 | 3 | 2
(Australia) J Stoltenberg | 4 | 6 | 6
(Australia) M Woodforde | 4 | 6^{6}
(United Kingdom) G Rusedski | 6 | 7^{8}
8 | (United States) A O'Brien | 7^{7} | 6
(Germany) M Goellner | 6^{4} | 3
(Australia) S Stolle | 6 | 7^{7}
(Denmark) K Carlsen | 4 | 6^{2}

Quarterfinals
(Australia) J Stoltenberg | 3 | 6^{4}
(United Kingdom) G Rusedski | 6 | 7^{7}
8 | (United States) A O'Brien | 6^{5} | 6 | 6^{4}
(Australia) S Stolle | 7^{7} | 4 | 7^{7}

Semifinals
(United Kingdom) G Rusedski | 6 | 6
(Australia) S Stolle | 3 | 4
