= 1998 Stella Artois Championships – Doubles =

Doubles
- 1998 Stella Artois Championships
- 1997 Champions: (Australia) Mark Philippoussis (Australia) Patrick Rafter

Final
- Score: No result due to rain.

Details
- Draw: 28

Events
Singles	Doubles
← 1997 ·	Queen's Club Championships	· 1999 →

Mark Philippoussis and Patrick Rafter were the defending champions but they competed with different partners that year, Philippoussis with Goran Ivanišević and Rafter with Jonas Björkman.

Ivanišević and Philippoussis lost in the first round to Max Mirnyi and Michael Sell.

Björkman and Rafter were one of the two teams in the final along with Todd Woodbridge and Mark Woodforde.

There was no result for the event due to rain.

== Seeds ==
The top four seeded teams received byes into the second round.

1. (Australia) Todd Woodbridge / (Australia) Mark Woodforde (final)
2. (India) Mahesh Bhupathi / (India) Leander Paes (semifinals)
3. (Sweden) Jonas Björkman / (Australia) Patrick Rafter (final)
4. (United States) Patrick Galbraith / (New Zealand) Brett Steven (semifinals)
5. (Zimbabwe) Wayne Black / (Canada) Sébastien Lareau (quarterfinals)
6. (United Kingdom) Neil Broad / (South Africa) Piet Norval (second round)
7. n/a
8. (Australia) Sandon Stolle / (Czech Republic) Cyril Suk (quarterfinals)

== Draw ==
=== Key ===
- Q = Qualifier
- WC = Wild card
- LL = Lucky loser
- Alt = Alternate
- ITF = ITF entry
- PR = Protected ranking
- SR = Special ranking
- SE = Special exempt
- JE = Junior exempt
- JR = Junior Accelerator Programme entrant
- CO = College Accelerator Programme entrant
- NG = Next Gen Accelerator Program entrant
- w/o = Walkover
- r = Retired
- d = Defaulted

=== Finals ===
Semifinals
1	(Australia) Todd Woodbridge (Australia) Mark Woodforde	1	7	7
4	(United States) Patrick Galbraith (New Zealand) Brett Steven	6	6	5
3	(Sweden) Jonas Björkman (Australia) Patrick Rafter	6	7
2	(India) Mahesh Bhupathi (India) Leander Paes	1	6

Final
1	(Australia) Todd Woodbridge (Australia) Mark Woodforde
3	(Sweden) Jonas Björkman (Australia) Patrick Rafter

=== Top half ===
First round
(South Africa) N Godwin (The Bahamas) M Merklein	3	4
(Netherlands) T Kempers (Netherlands) M Oosting	6	6
(Croatia) G Ivanišević (Australia) M Philippoussis	6	4	2
(Belarus) M Mirnyi (United States) M Sell	4	6	6
(Netherlands) S Noteboom (Russia) A Olhovskiy	2	2
8	(Australia) S Stolle (Czech Republic) C Suk	6	6
(United States) J Gimelstob (United States) B MacPhie	4	4
(Mexico) D Roditi (Armenia) S Sargsian	6	6
WC	(United States) T Martin (United Kingdom) G Rusedski	3	6	4
(Australia) W Arthurs (Australia) A Kratzmann	6	3	6
(South Africa) C Haggard (Australia) M Tebbutt	2	7	1
5	(Zimbabwe) W Black (Canada) S Lareau	6	6	6

Second round
1	(Australia) T Woodbridge (Australia) M Woodforde	6	6
(Netherlands) T Kempers (Netherlands) M Oosting	1	4
(Belarus) M Mirnyi (United States) M Sell	4	6
8	(Australia) S Stolle (Czech Republic) C Suk	6	7
4	(United States) P Galbraith (New Zealand) B Steven	6	6
(Mexico) D Roditi (Armenia) S Sargsian	1	4
(Australia) W Arthurs (Australia) A Kratzmann	6	5	3
5	(Zimbabwe) W Black (Canada) S Lareau	4	7	6

Quarterfinals
1	(Australia) T Woodbridge (Australia) M Woodforde	6	6
8	(Australia) S Stolle (Czech Republic) C Suk	4	4
4	(United States) P Galbraith (New Zealand) B Steven	6	6
5	(Zimbabwe) W Black (Canada) S Lareau	3	2

Semifinals
1	(Australia) T Woodbridge (Australia) M Woodforde	1	7	7
4	(United States) P Galbraith (New Zealand) B Steven	6	6	5

=== Bottom half ===
First round
6	(United Kingdom) N Broad (South Africa) P Norval	7	6
(United Kingdom) D Sapsford (United Kingdom) C Wilkinson	5	2
WC	(Slovakia) K Kučera (Czech Republic) D Vacek	4	1
LL	(France) A Clément (France) J Golmard	6	6
(South Africa) G Stafford (Zimbabwe) K Ullyett	5	3
(Zimbabwe) B Black (United States) A O'Brien	7	6
Q	(Venezuela) M Ruah (Brazil) A Sá	6	4
WC	(Denmark) K Carlsen (Sweden) T Enqvist	7	6
Q	(United States) D Flach (United States) G Van Emburgh	6	6
(United States) K Kinnear (United States) D Randall	4	4
WC	(United Kingdom) T Henman (United States) P Sampras	7	5	6
(The Bahamas) M Knowles (Canada) D Nestor	6	7	3

Second round
6	(United Kingdom) N Broad (South Africa) P Norval	4	6	4
LL	(France) A Clément (France) J Golmard	6	2	6
(Zimbabwe) B Black (United States) A O'Brien	6	3
3	(Sweden) J Björkman (Australia) P Rafter	7	6
WC	(Denmark) K Carlsen (Sweden) T Enqvist	4	3
Q	(United States) D Flach (United States) G Van Emburgh	6	6
WC	(United Kingdom) T Henman (United States) P Sampras	1	1
2	(India) M Bhupathi (India) L Paes	6	6

Quarterfinals
LL	(France) A Clément (France) J Golmard	7	0	4
3	(Sweden) J Björkman (Australia) P Rafter	6	6	6
Q	(United States) D Flach (United States) G Van Emburgh	4	0
2	(India) M Bhupathi (India) L Paes	6	6

Semifinals
3	(Sweden) J Björkman (Australia) P Rafter	6	7
2	(India) M Bhupathi (India) L Paes	1	6
