= 2000 Nottingham Open =

- Date: 19–25 June
- Edition: 11th
- Category: International Series
- Draw: 32S / 16D
- Prize money: $350,000
- Surface: Grass / outdoor
- Location: Nottingham, United Kingdom

Champions

Singles
- (France) Sébastien Grosjean

Doubles
- (United States) Donald Johnson / (South Africa) Piet Norval
← 1999 ·	Nottingham Open	· 2001 →

The 2000 Nottingham Open was an Association of Tennis Professionals (ATP) tournament held in Nottingham, Great Britain. The tournament was held from 19 June to 26 June 2000. Fourth-seeded Sébastien Grosjean won his second title of the year and the 2nd of his career.

== Finals ==
=== Singles ===
(France) Sébastien Grosjean defeated (Zimbabwe) Byron Black, 7–6^{(9–7)}, 6–3

- It was Grosjean's first singles title of his career.

=== Doubles ===
(United States) Donald Johnson / (South Africa) Piet Norval defeated (South Africa) Ellis Ferreira / (United States) Rick Leach, 1–6, 6–4, 6–3
