= Trey Phillips =

Trey Phillips may refer to:

- Trey Phillips (tennis) (born 1973), American tennis player
- Trey Phillips, cast of Laguna Beach: The Real Orange County
