= 1998 Nottingham Open – Singles =

Singles
- 1998 Nottingham Open

Final
- Champion: (Sweden) Jonas Björkman
- Runner-up: (Zimbabwe) Byron Black
- Score: 6–3, 6–2

Details
- Draw: 32
- Seeds: 8

Events
Singles	Doubles
← 1997 ·	Nottingham Open	· 1999 →

Jonas Björkman defeated Byron Black 6–3, 6–2 in the final to secure the title.

== Seeds ==
1. (Chile) Marcelo Ríos (first round)
2. (Sweden) Jonas Björkman (champion)
3. (Spain) Félix Mantilla (first round)
4. (France) Cédric Pioline (second round)
5. (Australia) Todd Woodbridge (first round)
6. (New Zealand) Brett Steven (quarterfinals)
7. (Zimbabwe) Byron Black (final)
8. (Morocco) Hicham Arazi (first round)

== Draw ==
=== Key ===
- Q = Qualifier
- WC = Wild card
- LL = Lucky loser
- Alt = Alternate
- SE = Special exempt
- PR = Protected ranking
- ITF = ITF entry
- JE = Junior exempt
- w/o = Walkover
- r = Retired
- d = Defaulted
- SR = Special ranking

=== Finals ===
Semifinals
7	(Zimbabwe) Byron Black	6	6
(Armenia) Sargis Sargsian	4	2
(France) Jérôme Golmard	3	6	3
WC/2	(Sweden) Jonas Björkman	6	2	6

Final
7	(Zimbabwe) Byron Black	3	2
WC/2	(Sweden) Jonas Björkman	6	6

=== Section 1 ===
First round
1	(Chile) M Ríos	6	4	0
(Italy) G Pozzi	3	6	6
(Spain) J Burillo	6	6
WC	(United Kingdom) C Wilkinson	2	2
WC	(United Kingdom) M Lee	1	4
(Argentina) G Cañas	6	6
(Ecuador) N Lapentti	0	2
7	(Zimbabwe) B Black	6	6
3	(Spain) F Mantilla	3	7^{9}	6^{3}
(Armenia) S Sargsian	6	6^{7}	7^{7}
(United States) R Reneberg	6	6
Q	(United Kingdom) B Cowan	4	3
(Australia) M Woodforde	6	4	6
(France) A Clément	1	6	1
(Paraguay) R Delgado	6^{5}	3
6	(New Zealand) B Steven	7^{7}	6

Second round
(Italy) G Pozzi	6	7
(Spain) J Burillo	4	5
(Argentina) G Cañas	6^{5}	4
7	(Zimbabwe) B Black	7^{7}	6
(Armenia) S Sargsian	6	6
(United States) R Reneberg	4	2
(Australia) M Woodforde	6	1	4
6	(New Zealand) B Steven	4	6	6

Quarterfinals
(Italy) G Pozzi	5	2
7	(Zimbabwe) B Black	7	6
(Armenia) S Sargsian	7^{10}	6
6	(New Zealand) B Steven	6^{8}	2

Semifinals
7	(Zimbabwe) B Black	6	6
(Armenia) S Sargsian	4	2

=== Section 2 ===
First round
5	(Australia) T Woodbridge	6^{2}	6^{3}
(Zimbabwe) W Black	7^{7}	7^{7}
(France) J Golmard	6	7^{7}
(Sweden) M Larsson	2	6^{4}
(Australia) S Draper	6	4	7^{7}
Q	(United States) J Gimelstob	3	6	6^{4}
(Sweden) T Nydahl	4	4
4	(France) C Pioline	6	6
8	(Morocco) H Arazi	2	4
(Germany) D Prinosil	6	6
Q	(Switzerland) G Bastl	5	3
Q	(Canada) D Nestor	7	6
SE	(Italy) L Tieleman	4	6	5
(South Africa) G Stafford	6	4	7
(Germany) M Goellner	4	4
WC/2	(Sweden) J Björkman	6	6

Second round
(Zimbabwe) W Black	1	3
(France) J Golmard	6	6
(Australia) S Draper	6	1
4	(France) C Pioline	3	1^{d}
(Germany) D Prinosil	7^{7}	3	7^{7}
Q	(Canada) D Nestor	6^{4}	6	6^{2}
(South Africa) G Stafford	2	3
WC/2	(Sweden) J Björkman	6	6

Quarterfinals
(France) J Golmard	6	6
(Australia) S Draper	4	3
(Germany) D Prinosil	6^{5}	3
WC/2	(Sweden) J Björkman	7^{7}	6

Semifinals
(France) J Golmard	3	6	3
WC/2	(Sweden) J Björkman	6	2	6
