= 1998 Stella Artois Championships – Singles =

Singles
- 1998 Stella Artois Championships

Final
- Champion: (Australia) Scott Draper
- Runner-up: (Italy) Laurence Tieleman
- Score: 7–6^{(7–5)}, 6–4

Details
- Draw: 56 (4WC/7Q/2LL)
- Seeds: 16

Events
Singles	Doubles
← 1997 ·	Queen's Club Championships	· 1999 →

Mark Philippoussis was the defending champion but lost in the first round to Jordi Burillo.

Scott Draper won in the final 7–6^{(7–5)}, 6–4 against Laurence Tieleman and became the lowest ranked player to win in the tournament's history.

== Seeds ==
The top eight seeds received a bye to the second round.

1. (United States) Pete Sampras (third round)
2. (United Kingdom) Greg Rusedski (third round, retired)
3. (Australia) Patrick Rafter (second round)
4. (Sweden) Jonas Björkman (third round)
5. (Slovakia) Karol Kučera (second round)
6. (France) ~~Cédric Pioline~~ (withdrew)
7. (United Kingdom) Tim Henman (quarterfinals)
8. (Sweden) Thomas Enqvist (quarterfinals)
9. (Australia) Mark Philippoussis (first round)
10. (Croatia) Goran Ivanišević (second round)
11. (United States) Todd Martin (first round)
12. (Australia) Todd Woodbridge (third round)
13. (New Zealand) Brett Steven (third round)
14. (Zimbabwe) Byron Black (semifinals)
15. (Australia) Mark Woodforde (semifinals)
16. (Australia) Jason Stoltenberg (first round)

== Draw ==
=== Key ===
- Q = Qualifier
- WC = Wild card
- LL = Lucky loser
- Alt = Alternate
- SE = Special exempt
- PR = Protected ranking
- ITF = ITF entry
- JE = Junior exempt
- w/o = Walkover
- r = Retired
- d = Defaulted
- SR = Special ranking

=== Finals ===
Semifinals
15	(Australia) Mark Woodforde	3	2
(Australia) Scott Draper	6	6
14	(Zimbabwe) Byron Black	6	3	2
Q	(Italy) Laurence Tieleman	3	6	6

Final
(Australia) Scott Draper	7^{7}	6
Q	(Italy) Laurence Tieleman	6^{5}	4

=== Top half ===
==== Section 1 ====
First round
Q	(Mexico) A Hernández	7^{11}	2	2
(Zimbabwe) W Black	6^{9}	6	6
WC	(United Kingdom) C Wilkinson	7	3	7
(Australia) S Stolle	5	6	5
(United States) J Gimelstob	7	3	2
15	(Australia) M Woodforde	5	6	6
9	(Australia) M Philippoussis	6^{9}	5
(Spain) J Burillo	7^{11}	7
Q	(The Bahamas) M Merklein	3	3
LL	(South Africa) D Nainkin	6	6
WC	(United Kingdom) M Petchey	3	3
(United States) A O'Brien	6	6

Second round
WC/1	(United States) P Sampras	6	6
(Zimbabwe) W Black	2	3
WC	(United Kingdom) C Wilkinson	1	6^{7}
15	(Australia) M Woodforde	6	7^{9}
(Spain) J Burillo	6	6
LL	(South Africa) D Nainkin	4	2
(United States) A O'Brien	4	6	2
8	(Sweden) T Enqvist	6	3	6

Third round
WC/1	(United States) P Sampras	3	2
15	(Australia) M Woodforde	6	6
(Spain) J Burillo	4	6	2
8	(Sweden) T Enqvist	6	3	6

Quarterfinals
15	(Australia) M Woodforde	6	1	6
8	(Sweden) T Enqvist	3	6	2

==== Section 2 ====
First round
(Australia) M Tebbutt	4	6	4
(Australia) S Draper	6	2	6
(Netherlands) J van Lottum	1	0
(France) A Clément	6	6
(Romania) A Pavel	3	6	2
13	(New Zealand) B Steven	6	4	6
12	(Australia) T Woodbridge	6	6
(Brazil) A Sá	2	3
(France) S Grosjean	7^{7}	7^{7}
(Netherlands) D van Scheppingen	6^{3}	6^{5}
(Czech Republic) D Vacek	6	1	3
(United States) D Flach	4	6	6

Second round
3	(Australia) P Rafter	6	5	4
(Australia) S Draper	4	7	6
(France) A Clément	2	1
13	(New Zealand) B Steven	6	6
12	(Australia) T Woodbridge	6	2	7^{7}
(France) S Grosjean	4	6	6^{3}
(United States) D Flach	5	6	6
6	(Slovakia) K Kučera	7	4	3

Third round
(Australia) S Draper	7^{8}	7^{7}
13	(New Zealand) B Steven	6^{6}	6^{3}
12	(Australia) T Woodbridge	4	6^{4}
(United States) D Flach	6	7^{7}

Quarterfinals
(Australia) S Draper	7^{9}	7^{7}
(United States) D Flach	6^{7}	6^{5}

=== Bottom half ===
==== Section 3 ====
First round
(Sweden) T Nydahl	1	1
Q	(Belarus) M Mirnyi	6	6
(South Africa) G Stafford	3	7	6
(India) L Paes	6	5	4
Q	(Switzerland) I Heuberger	6	6
11	(United States) T Martin	4	2
14	(Zimbabwe) B Black	6	5	6
(Argentina) G Cañas	2	7	3
(Germany) L Burgsmüller	6	0	4
(United States) J-M Gambill	4	6	6
(Canada) D Nestor	6	2	6
(United Kingdom) A Richardson	4	6	1

Second round
LL	(United States) B MacPhie	7^{7}	6
Q	(Belarus) M Mirnyi	6^{3}	4
(South Africa) G Stafford	3	4
Q	(Switzerland) I Heuberger	6	6
14	(Zimbabwe) B Black	5	6	6
(United States) J-M Gambill	7	4	4
(Canada) D Nestor	2	5
4	(Sweden) J Björkman	6	7

Third round
LL	(United States) B MacPhie	6	6
Q	(Switzerland) I Heuberger	3	3
14	(Zimbabwe) B Black	6	4	6
4	(Sweden) J Björkman	3	6	3

Quarterfinals
LL	(United States) B MacPhie	5	1
14	(Zimbabwe) B Black	7	6

==== Section 4 ====
First round
(Armenia) S Sargsian	6	6
WC	(United Kingdom) M Lee	2	3
(Germany) M Sinner	6	3	5
(Australia) P Tramacchi	4	6	7
(United States) D Wheaton	1	6^{8}
10	(Croatia) G Ivanišević	6	7^{10}
16	(Australia) J Stoltenberg	6	6^{5}	2
Q	(Italy) L Tieleman	3	7^{7}	6
Q	(Australia) L Hewitt	6	6^{6}	4
(Canada) S Lareau	3	7^{8}	6
(France) J Golmard	3	6	6
(Denmark) K Carlsen	6	4	4

Second round
7	(United Kingdom) T Henman	6	6
(Armenia) S Sargsian	3	4
(Australia) P Tramacchi	4	6	1
10	(Croatia) G Ivanišević	6	3	6
Q	(Italy) L Tieleman	0	6	6
(Canada) S Lareau	6	1	4
(France) J Golmard	7^{7}	4	1
2	(United Kingdom) G Rusedski	6^{4}	6	6

Third round
7	(United Kingdom) T Henman	6	6^{5}	6
10	(Croatia) G Ivanišević	1	7^{7}	4
Q	(Italy) L Tieleman	2
2	(United Kingdom) G Rusedski	2^{r}

Quarterfinals
7	(United Kingdom) T Henman	6	6^{4}	4
Q	(Italy) L Tieleman	2	7^{7}	6
