= Alex Witt (tennis) =

American tennis player

- Country (sports): United States
- Born: March 21, 1976 (age 48)
- Prize money: $23,724

Singles
- Career record: 0–1
- Highest ranking: No. 438 (June 19, 2000)

Doubles
- Highest ranking: No. 398 (June 12, 2000)

Alex Witt (born March 21, 1976) is an American former professional tennis player.

Witt was a collegiate tennis player for Northwestern University in the mid-1990s and accumulated 107 career singles wins. He was named Big Ten Player of the Year in 1997 and turned professional after graduating the following year.

As a professional player he featured mainly on the ITF Futures and ATP Challenger circuits. In 2000 he qualified for his first and only ATP Tour main draw at the Stella Artois Championships (Queen's Club), where he lost his first round match to Jens Knippschild in three sets.

== ITF Futures titles ==
=== Doubles: (1) ===
No.	Date	Tournament	Surface	Partner	Opponents	Score
1.	May 2000	China F2, Chengdu	Hard	(United States) Doug Bohaboy	(South Africa) Rik de Voest (South Africa) Johan du Randt	3–6, 6–4, 7–5
