= 1998 Nottingham Open =

- Date: 15–21 June
- Edition: 9th
- Draw: 32S / 16D
- Prize money: $315,000
- Surface: Grass / outdoor
- Location: Nottingham, United Kingdom

Champions

Singles
- (Sweden) Jonas Björkman

Doubles
- (United States) Justin Gimelstob / (South Africa) Byron Talbot
← 1997 ·	Nottingham Open	· 1999 →

The 1998 Nottingham Open was an ATP tournament held in Nottingham, Great Britain. The tournament was held from 15 June to 22 June 1998.

Second-seeded Jonas Björkman won his second title of the year and the 16th of his career.

== Finals ==
=== Singles ===
(Sweden) Jonas Björkman defeated (Zimbabwe) Byron Black, 6–3, 6–2

=== Doubles ===
(United States) Justin Gimelstob / (South Africa) Byron Talbot defeated (Canada) Sébastien Lareau / (Canada) Daniel Nestor, 7–5, 6–7, 6–4
