= 1999 Stella Artois Championships =

- Date: 7–14 June
- Edition: 97th
- Category: World Series
- Draw: 56S / 28D
- Prize money: $725,000
- Surface: Grass / outdoor
- Location: London, United Kingdom
- Venue: Queen's Club

Champions

Singles
- (United States) Pete Sampras

Doubles
- (Canada) Sébastien Lareau / (United States) Alex O'Brien
← 1998 ·	Queen's Club Championships	· 2000 →

The 1999 Stella Artois Championships was a men's tennis tournament played on grass courts at the Queen's Club in London in the United Kingdom and was part of the World Series of the 1999 ATP Tour. It was the 97th edition of the tournament and was held from 7 June through 14 June 1999. Second-seeded Pete Sampras won the singles title, his second at the event after 1995.

== Finals ==
=== Singles ===
(United States) Pete Sampras defeated (United Kingdom) Tim Henman 6–7^{(1–7)}, 6–4, 7–6^{(7–4)}

- It was Sampras' 1st title of the year and the 59th of his career.

=== Doubles ===
(Canada) Sébastien Lareau / (United States) Alex O'Brien defeated (Australia) Todd Woodbridge / (Australia) Mark Woodforde 6–3, 7–6

- It was Lareau's 2nd title of the year and the 9th of his career. It was O'Brien's 2nd title of the year and the 9th of his career.
