= 1998 Stella Artois Championships =

- Date: 8–15 June
- Edition: 96th
- Category: World Series
- Draw: 56S / 28D
- Prize money: $725,000
- Surface: Grass / outdoor
- Location: London, United Kingdom
- Venue: Queen's Club

Champions

Singles
- (Australia) Scott Draper

Doubles
- N/A: The doubles final was cancelled due to rain.
← 1997 ·	Queen's Club Championships	· 1999 →

The 1998 Stella Artois Championships was a men's tennis tournament played on grass courts at the Queen's Club in London in the United Kingdom and was part of the World Series of the 1998 ATP Tour. It was the 96th edition of the tournament and was held from 8 June through 15 June 1998. Scott Draper won the singles title.

== Finals ==
=== Singles ===
(Australia) Scott Draper defeated (Italy) Laurence Tieleman 7–6^{(7–5)}, 6–4

- It was Draper's only title of the year and the 1st of his career. He was the lowest ranked player ever to win the tournament, while Tieleman was the lowest ranked finalist.

=== Doubles ===
(Australia) Todd Woodbridge / (Australia) Mark Woodforde vs. (Sweden) Jonas Björkman / (Australia) Patrick Rafter

- The doubles final was cancelled due to bad weather. This was the second time in the Open Era that a final at the Championships had been cancelled, the first being the washout of both the singles and doubles finals in 1968.
