= 2000 Stella Artois Championships – Singles =

Singles
- 2000 Stella Artois Championships

Final
- Champion: (Australia) Lleyton Hewitt
- Runner-up: (United States) Pete Sampras
- Score: 6–4, 6–4

Details
- Draw: 56
- Seeds: 16

Events
Singles	Doubles
- Queen's Club Championships

Pete Sampras was the defending champion but lost in the final 6–4, 6–4 against Lleyton Hewitt.

== Seeds ==
The top eight seeds received a bye to the second round.

1. (United States) Andre Agassi (third round, retired)
2. (United States) Pete Sampras (final)
3. (Sweden) ~~Magnus Norman~~ (withdrew)
4. (France) Cédric Pioline (quarterfinals)
5. (Sweden) Thomas Enqvist (second round)
6. (Australia) Lleyton Hewitt (champion)
7. (Russia) Marat Safin (quarterfinals)
8. (United Kingdom) Tim Henman (second round)
9. (United Kingdom) Greg Rusedski (third round)
10. (United States) Todd Martin (second round)
11. (Australia) Mark Philippoussis (second round)
12. (Romania) Andrei Pavel (quarterfinals)
13. (France) Fabrice Santoro (second round)
14. (France) Sébastien Grosjean (second round)
15. (Switzerland) Marc Rosset (first round, retired)
16. (Australia) Andrew Ilie (first round)

== Draw ==
Key

- Q = Qualifier
- WC = Wild card
- LL = Lucky loser
- Alt = Alternate
- ITF = ITF entry
- PR = Protected ranking
- SR = Special ranking
- SE = Special exempt
- JE = Junior exempt
- JR = Junior Accelerator Programme entrant
- CO = College Accelerator Programme entrant
- NG = Next Gen Accelerator Program entrant
- w/o = Walkover
- r = Retired
- d = Defaulted

=== Finals ===
Semifinals
(Italy) Gianluca Pozzi	1	4
6	(Australia) Lleyton Hewitt	6	6
(Italy) Davide Sanguinetti	5	3
WC/2	(United States) Pete Sampras	7	6

Final
6	(Australia) Lleyton Hewitt	6	6
WC/2	(United States) Pete Sampras	4	4

=== Top half ===
==== Section 1 ====
First round
(Sweden) M Gustafsson	6	3	4
(France) A Dupuis	4	6	6
(Netherlands) J Siemerink	3	6	1
(Italy) G Pozzi	6	4	6
(Haiti) R Agénor	6	2
15	(Switzerland) M Rosset	3	0^{r}
9	(United Kingdom) G Rusedski	7	6
(South Africa) W Ferreira	5	4
(Germany) J Knippschild	3	6	6
Q	(United States) A Witt	6	4	3
(France) J Boutter	6	6
(Switzerland) L Manta	2	4

Second round
WC/1	(United States) A Agassi	6	5	6
(France) A Dupuis	1	7	3
(Italy) G Pozzi	6	4	6
(Haiti) R Agénor	3	6	0
9	(United Kingdom) G Rusedski	7^{7}	7^{11}
(Germany) J Knippschild	6^{2}	6^{9}
(France) J Boutter	5	7	3
7	(Russia) M Safin	7	5	6

Third round
WC/1	(United States) A Agassi	6	2^{r}
(Italy) G Pozzi	4	3
9	(United Kingdom) G Rusedski	7^{7}	6^{5}	4
7	(Russia) M Safin	6^{2}	7^{7}	6

Quarterfinals
(Italy) G Pozzi	7	7^{7}
7	(Russia) M Safin	5	6^{4}

==== Section 2 ====
First round
(Romania) A Voinea	3	3
(United States) J-M Gambill	6	6
(United States) J Gimelstob	2	6	6
(United States) V Spadea	6	4	1
(United States) P Goldstein	6^{3}	1
13	(France) F Santoro	7^{7}	6
11	(Australia) M Philippoussis	6	7
(Australia) W Arthurs	3	5
(Croatia) G Ivanišević	7	7
(Italy) L Tieleman	5	5
Q	(United States) D Wheaton	6	6
(Sweden) A Vinciguerra	3	2

Second round
4	(France) C Pioline	5	6	6
(United States) J-M Gambill	7	2	3
(United States) J Gimelstob	4	6	6
13	(France) F Santoro	6	4	0
11	(Australia) M Philippoussis	3	3
(Croatia) G Ivanišević	6	6
Q	(United States) D Wheaton	4	4
6	(Australia) L Hewitt	6	6

Third round
4	(France) C Pioline	6	7
(United States) J Gimelstob	4	5
(Croatia) G Ivanišević	4	4
6	(Australia) L Hewitt	6	6

Quarterfinals
4	(France) C Pioline	4	4
6	(Australia) L Hewitt	6	6

=== Bottom half ===
==== Section 3 ====
First round
WC	(United Kingdom) B Cowan	2	5
(Slovakia) K Kučera	6	7
(Zimbabwe) B Black	6	6
(France) S Huet	3	1
Q	(Netherlands) R Sluiter	7^{12}	3	4
12	(Romania) A Pavel	6^{10}	6	6
14	(France) S Grosjean	6	6
(Switzerland) G Bastl	1	0
(Italy) D Sanguinetti	6^{5}	6	6
Q	(United Kingdom) M Lee	7^{7}	4	2
Q	(Canada) S Lareau	4	6	6^{2}
(Canada) D Nestor	6	2	7^{7}

Second round
5	(Sweden) T Enqvist	6	6^{3}	3
(Slovakia) K Kučera	3	7^{7}	6
(Zimbabwe) B Black	6^{5}	4
12	(Romania) A Pavel	7^{7}	6
14	(France) S Grosjean	6^{4}	6	6^{6}
(Italy) D Sanguinetti	7^{7}	1	7^{8}
(Canada) D Nestor	6	6
LL	(Australia) M Hill	4	3

Third round
(Slovakia) K Kučera	6^{5}	6	5
12	(Romania) A Pavel	7^{7}	3	7
(Italy) D Sanguinetti	6	4	7
(Canada) D Nestor	3	6	5

Quarterfinals
12	(Romania) A Pavel	6	6^{5}	3
(Italy) D Sanguinetti	3	7^{7}	6

==== Section 4 ====
First round
(Armenia) S Sargsian	3	6	4
Q	(United States) B Bryan	6	3	6
(Germany) M Hantschk	3	6^{4}
(Belarus) M Mirnyi	6	7^{7}
(Thailand) P Srichaphan	6^{4}	4
10	(United States) T Martin	7^{7}	6
16	(Australia) A Ilie	6	3	6^{0}
(Brazil) A Sá	4	6	7^{7}
(Belgium) C Rochus	7	4	3
Q	(France) M Llodra	5	6	6
WC	(United Kingdom) A Parmar	7^{9}	2	6
WC	(Australia) S Draper	6^{7}	6	0

Second round
8	(United Kingdom) T Henman	6^{2}	4
Q	(United States) B Bryan	7^{7}	6
(Belarus) M Mirnyi	6	6^{4}	6
10	(United States) T Martin	3	7^{7}	3
(Brazil) A Sá	1	0^{r}
Q	(France) M Llodra	6	3
WC	(United Kingdom) A Parmar	7^{10}	4	3
WC/2	(United States) P Sampras	6^{8}	6	6

Third round
Q	(United States) B Bryan	6	1	6
(Belarus) M Mirnyi	4	6	2
Q	(France) M Llodra	1	6^{2}
WC/2	(United States) P Sampras	6	7^{7}

Quarterfinals
Q	(United States) B Bryan	4	4
WC/2	(United States) P Sampras	6	6
