= Trey Phillips (tennis) =

American tennis player (born 1973)

- Country (sports): United States
- Born: June 27, 1973 (age 53) Austin, Texas, U.S.
- Height: 6 ft 6 in (198 cm)
- Prize money: $14,590

Singles
- Highest ranking: No. 772 (June 24, 1996)

Doubles
- Career record: 0–5
- Highest ranking: No. 154 (June 9, 1997)

Grand Slam doubles results
- Wimbledon: Q1 (1997)

Trey Phillips (born June 27, 1973) is an American former professional tennis player.

Phillips grew up in Austin, Texas and won state tennis titles at Westlake High School.

A three-time All-American at the University of Texas, Phillips went on to compete on the professional tour and was ranked as high as 154 in the world in doubles. He won one ATP Challenger doubles title.

Phillips now works as a real estate agent in Austin.

== ATP Challenger finals ==
=== Doubles: 4 (1–3) ===
Result	No.	Date	Tournament	Surface	Partner	Opponents	Score
Loss	1.	Sep 1996	Urbana, United States	Hard	(United States) Brandon Coupe	(United States) Scott Humphries (United States) David DiLucia	4–6, 2–6
Loss	2.	Feb 1997	Lübeck, Germany	Carpet	(United Kingdom) Chris Wilkinson	(Germany) Mathias Huning (Netherlands) Joost Winnink	6–7, 6–7
Win	1.	Mar 1997	Magdeburg, Germany	Carpet	(United Kingdom) Chris Wilkinson	(Czech Republic) Tomáš Anzari (Czech Republic) Petr Luxa	6–3, 6–4
Loss	3.	Apr 1997	Split, Croatia	Clay	(Mexico) David Roditi	(Romania) Dinu Pescariu (United States) Devin Bowen	6–7, 3–6
