= 2000 Nottingham Open – Singles =

Singles
- 2000 Nottingham Open

Final
- Champion: (France) Sébastien Grosjean
- Runner-up: (Zimbabwe) Byron Black
- Score: 7–6^{(9–7)}, 6–3

Details
- Draw: 32
- Seeds: 8

Events
Singles	Doubles
- Nottingham Open

Cédric Pioline was the defending champion, but lost in the first round to Arvind Parmar. Sébastien Grosjean defeated Byron Black 7–6^{(9–7)}, 6–3 in the final to secure the title.

== Seeds ==
1. (France) Cédric Pioline (first round)
2. (United Kingdom) Tim Henman (first round)
3. (France) Fabrice Santoro (second round)
4. (France) Sébastien Grosjean (champion)
5. (Switzerland) Marc Rosset (second round)
6. (Austria) Stefan Koubek (first round)
7. (Switzerland) Roger Federer (first round)
8. (Australia) Andrew Ilie (first round)

== Draw ==
Key

- Q = Qualifier
- WC = Wild card
- LL = Lucky loser
- Alt = Alternate
- ITF = ITF entry
- PR = Protected ranking
- SR = Special ranking
- SE = Special exempt
- JE = Junior exempt
- JR = Junior Accelerator Programme entrant
- CO = College Accelerator Programme entrant
- NG = Next Gen Accelerator Program entrant
- w/o = Walkover
- r = Retired
- d = Defaulted

=== Finals ===
Semifinals
(Zimbabwe) Byron Black	7^{7}	6
(United States) Jan-Michael Gambill	6^{5}	1
4	(France) Sébastien Grosjean	7^{7}	6
(Sweden) Jonas Björkman	6^{5}	4

Final
(Zimbabwe) Byron Black	6^{7}	3
4	(France) Sébastien Grosjean	7^{9}	6

=== Section 1 ===
First round
1	(France) C Pioline	5	6^{3}
WC	(United Kingdom) A Parmar	7	7^{7}
Q	(United Kingdom) B Cowan	3	7^{7}	6
(Switzerland) G Bastl	6	6^{4}	4
(Brazil) A Sá	1	7^{7}	1
(Zimbabwe) B Black	6	6^{3}	6
(Armenia) S Sargsian	6^{5}	6	5
8	(Australia) A Ilie	7^{7}	2	0^{r}
3	(France) F Santoro	3	7^{7}	6
Q	(United States) J Palmer	6	6^{5}	4
(United States) J Gambill	6	6
WC	(United Kingdom) M Lee	3	3
(Italy) G Pozzi	7	6
(Italy) D Sanguinetti	5	4
(France) A Clément	3	7^{7}	6
6	(Austria) S Koubek	6	6^{5}	3

Second round
WC	(United Kingdom) A Parmar	6	6
Q	(United Kingdom) B Cowan	3	4
(Zimbabwe) B Black	6	2	6
(Armenia) S Sargsian	3	6	4
3	(France) F Santoro	6^{0}	1
(United States) J Gambill	7^{7}	6
(Italy) G Pozzi	6	6^{0}	6
(France) A Clément	4	7^{7}	1

Quarterfinals
WC	(United Kingdom) A Parmar	4	4
(Zimbabwe) B Black	6	6
(United States) J Gambill	6	6
(Italy) G Pozzi	4	4

Semifinals
(Zimbabwe) B Black	7^{7}	6
(United States) J Gambill	6^{5}	1

=== Section 2 ===
First round
5	(Switzerland) M Rosset	6	6
(Argentina) J I Chela	4	4
(United States) J Gimelstob	5	7^{8}	3
Q	(South Africa) W Ferreira	7	6^{6}	6
(Australia) W Arthurs	7^{7}	7^{7}
(Germany) R Schüttler	6^{5}	6^{1}
(United States) V Spadea	1	6	5
4	(France) S Grosjean	6	4	7
7	(Switzerland) R Federer	5	1
(Australia) R Fromberg	7	6
(Chile) N Massú	7^{7}	6
Q	(Sweden) J Landsberg	6^{5}	1
(Spain) A Martín	2	2
(Belarus) M Mirnyi	6	6
(Sweden) J Björkman	5	6	7
2	(United Kingdom) T Henman	7	4	5

Second round
5	(Switzerland) M Rosset	1	2
Q	(South Africa) W Ferreira	6	6
(Australia) W Arthurs	6^{4}	6^{11}
4	(France) S Grosjean	7^{7}	7^{13}
(Australia) R Fromberg	6^{4}	6	6
(Chile) N Massú	7^{7}	3	3
(Belarus) M Mirnyi	4	4
(Sweden) J Björkman	6	6

Quarterfinals
Q	(South Africa) W Ferreira	6^{3}	3
4	(France) S Grosjean	7^{7}	6
(Australia) R Fromberg	5	6	3
(Sweden) J Björkman	7	4	6

Semifinals
4	(France) S Grosjean	7^{7}	6
(Sweden) J Björkman	6^{5}	4
