= 2000 Stella Artois Championships =

- Date: 12–19 June
- Edition: 98th
- Category: International Series
- Draw: 56S / 28D
- Prize money: $775,000
- Surface: Grass / outdoor
- Location: London, United Kingdom
- Venue: Queen's Club

Champions

Singles
- (Australia) Lleyton Hewitt

Doubles
- (Australia) Todd Woodbridge / (Australia) Mark Woodforde
← 1999 ·	Queen's Club Championships	· 2001 →

The 2000 Stella Artois Championships was a men's tennis tournament played on grass courts at the Queen's Club in London, United Kingdom and was part of the International Series of the 2000 ATP Tour. It was the 98th edition of the tournament and was held from 12 June until 19 June 2000. Sixth-seeded Lleyton Hewitt won the singles title.

== Finals ==
=== Singles ===
(Australia) Lleyton Hewitt defeated (United States) Pete Sampras 6–4, 6–4

- It was Hewitt's 4th title of the year and the 6th of his career.

=== Doubles ===
(Australia) Todd Woodbridge / (Australia) Mark Woodforde defeated (United States) Jonathan Stark / (Philippines) Eric Taino 6–7^{(5–7)}, 6–3, 7–6^{(7–1)}

- It was Woodbridge's 6th title of the year and the 67th of his career. It was Woodforde's 6th title of the year and the 69th of his career.
