= Ellis Ferreira =

South African tennis player

- Full name: Ellis Russell Ferreira
- Country (sports): South Africa
- Residence: Atlanta, United States
- Born: 19 February 1970 (age 56) Pretoria, South Africa
- Height: 1.88 m (6 ft 2 in)
- Turned pro: 1992
- Plays: Left-handed
- Prize money: $2,378,295

Singles
- Career record: 4–8
- Career titles: 0
- Highest ranking: No. 210 (3 October 1994)

Grand Slam singles results
- Wimbledon: 1R (1994)
- US Open: 2R (1994)

Doubles
- Career record: 314–201
- Career titles: 18
- Highest ranking: No. 2 (31 January 2000)

Grand Slam doubles results
- Australian Open: W (2000)
- French Open: QF (1999)
- Wimbledon: SF (1996)
- US Open: F (2000)

Mixed doubles
- Career titles: 1

Grand Slam mixed doubles results
- Australian Open: W (2001)
- French Open: 3R (1997, 1999)
- Wimbledon: QF (2001)
- US Open: SF (2001)

Ellis Ferreira (born 19 February 1970) is a former professional male tennis player from South Africa. He played collegiately at the University of Alabama, earning all-SEC and all-American honors. Ferreira competed at the 1996 Summer Olympics in men's doubles with Wayne Ferreira (to whom he is unrelated). He won two Grand Slam doubles titles, the Men's title at the 2000 Australian Open with Rick Leach and the mixed doubles at the Australian Open with Corina Morariu in 2001. Ferreira was named the Senior Assistant Men's and Women's Tennis Head Coach at Washington College in Chestertown, Maryland, in July 2007. Ferreira is now the co-owner of the Eagleton/ Ferreira Tennis Academy on Longboat Key in Florida.

== Career finals ==
=== Doubles: 33 (18 titles / 15 runner-ups) ===
Finals by category Grand Slam (1–1) Tennis Masters Cup (1–0) ATP Masters Series (4–6) ATP Championship Series (2–4) ATP Tour (10–4)	Finals by surface Hard (7–11) Clay (4–3) Grass (2–1) Carpet (5–0)

Result	W–L	Date	Tournament	Surface	Partner	Opponents	Score
Loss	0–1	Apr 1994	Sun City, South Africa	Hard	(South Africa) Grant Stafford	(South Africa) Marius Barnard (South Africa) Brent Haygarth	3–6, 5–7
Loss	0–2	Jul 1995	Stuttgart Outdoor, Germany	Clay	(Netherlands) Jan Siemerink	(Spain) Tomás Carbonell (Spain) Francisco Roig	6–3, 3–6, 4–6
Win	1–2	Oct 1995	Vienna, Austria	Carpet	(Netherlands) Jan Siemerink	(Australia) Todd Woodbridge (Australia) Mark Woodforde	6–4, 7–5
Win	2–2	Jan 1996	Sydney Outdoor, Australia	Hard	(Netherlands) Jan Siemerink	(United States) Patrick McEnroe (Australia) Sandon Stolle	5–7, 6–4, 6–1
Loss	2–3	Apr 1996	Miami, United States	Hard	(United States) Patrick Galbraith	(Australia) Todd Woodbridge (Australia) Mark Woodforde	1–6, 3–6
Win	3–3	Apr 1996	Monte Carlo, Monaco	Clay	(Netherlands) Jan Siemerink	(Sweden) Jonas Björkman (Sweden) Nicklas Kulti	2–6, 6–3, 6–2
Win	4–3	Jan 1997	Auckland, New Zealand	Hard	(United States) Patrick Galbraith	(United States) Rick Leach (United States) Jonathan Stark	6–4, 4–6, 7–6
Win	5–3	Feb 1997	Memphis, United States	Hard (i)	(United States) Patrick Galbraith	(United States) Rick Leach (United States) Jonathan Stark	6–3, 3–6, 6–1
Loss	5–4	Mar 1997	Philadelphia, United States	Hard (i)	(United States) Patrick Galbraith	(Canada) Sébastien Lareau (United States) Alex O'Brien	3–6, 3–6
Win	6–4	Jun 1997	Nottingham, England	Grass	(United States) Patrick Galbraith	(United Kingdom) Danny Sapsford (United Kingdom) Chris Wilkinson	4–6, 7–6, 7–6
Win	7–4	Oct 1997	Vienna, Austria	Carpet	(United States) Patrick Galbraith	(Germany) Marc-Kevin Goellner (Germany) David Prinosil	6–3, 6–4
Win	8–4	Oct 1997	Lyon, France	Carpet	(United States) Patrick Galbraith	(France) Olivier Delaître (France) Fabrice Santoro	3–6, 6–2, 6–4
Loss	8–5	Nov 1997	Stockholm, Sweden	Hard (i)	(United States) Patrick Galbraith	(Germany) Marc-Kevin Goellner (United States) Richey Reneberg	3–6, 6–3, 6–7
Loss	8–6	Jan 1998	Adelaide, Australia	Hard	(United States) Rick Leach	(Australia) Joshua Eagle (Australia) Andrew Florent	4–6, 7–6, 3–6
Loss	8–7	Feb 1998	Memphis, United States	Hard (i)	(Mexico) David Roditi	(Australia) Todd Woodbridge (Australia) Mark Woodforde	3–6, 4–6
Win	9–7	Mar 1998	Miami, United States	Hard	(United States) Rick Leach	(United States) Alex O'Brien (United States) Jonathan Stark	6–2, 6–4
Loss	9–8	Apr 1998	Barcelona, Spain	Clay	(United States) Rick Leach	(Netherlands) Jacco Eltingh (Netherlands) Paul Haarhuis	5–7, 0–6
Win	10–8	May 1998	Atlanta, United States	Clay	(South Africa) Brent Haygarth	(United States) Alex O'Brien (United States) Richey Reneberg	6–3, 0–6, 6–2
Loss	10–9	May 1998	Rome, Italy	Clay	(United States) Rick Leach	(India) Mahesh Bhupathi (India) Leander Paes	4–6, 6–4, 6–7
Win	11–9	Jun 1998	Halle, Germany	Grass	(United States) Rick Leach	(South Africa) John-Laffnie de Jager (Germany) Marc-Kevin Goellner	4–6, 6–4, 7–6
Loss	11–10	Aug 1998	Toronto, Canada	Hard	(United States) Rick Leach	(Czech Republic) Martin Damm (United States) Jim Grabb	7–6, 2–6, 6–7
Loss	11–11	Mar 1999	Indian Wells, United States	Hard	(United States) Rick Leach	(Zimbabwe) Wayne Black (Australia) Sandon Stolle	6–7, 3–6
Win	12–11	May 1999	Rome, Italy	Clay	(United States) Rick Leach	(South Africa) David Adams (South Africa) John-Laffnie de Jager	6–7, 6–1, 6–2
Win	13–11	Jan 2000	Auckland, New Zealand	Hard	(United States) Rick Leach	(France) Olivier Delaître (United States) Jeff Tarango	7–5, 6–4
Win	14–11	Jan 2000	Australian Open, Australia	Hard	(United States) Rick Leach	(Zimbabwe) Wayne Black (Australia) Andrew Kratzmann	6–4, 3–6, 6–3, 3–6, 18–16
Win	15–11	Apr 2000	Atlanta, United States	Clay	(United States) Rick Leach	(United States) Justin Gimelstob (The Bahamas) Mark Knowles	6–3, 6–4
Loss	15–12	Jun 2000	Nottingham, England	Grass	(United States) Rick Leach	(United States) Donald Johnson (South Africa) Piet Norval	6–1, 4–6, 3–6
Loss	15–13	Aug 2000	Cincinnati, United States	Hard	(United States) Rick Leach	(Australia) Todd Woodbridge (Australia) Mark Woodforde	6–7, 4–6
Loss	15–14	Sep 2000	U.S. Open, New York	Hard	(United States) Rick Leach	(Australia) Lleyton Hewitt (Belarus) Max Mirnyi	4–6, 7–5, 6–7
Loss	15–15	Oct 2001	Stuttgart Indoor, Germany	Hard (i)	(United States) Jeff Tarango	(Belarus) Max Mirnyi (Australia) Sandon Stolle	6–7, 6–7
Win	16–15	Oct 2001	Basel, Switzerland	Carpet	(United States) Rick Leach	(India) Mahesh Bhupathi (India) Leander Paes	7–6, 6–4
Win	17–15	Nov 2001	Paris, France	Carpet	(United States) Rick Leach	(India) Mahesh Bhupathi (India) Leander Paes	3–6, 6–4, 6–3
Win	18–15	Feb 2002	ATP Doubles Challenge Cup, Bangalore	Hard	(United States) Rick Leach	(Czech Republic) Petr Pála (Czech Republic) Pavel Vízner	6–7^{(6–8)}, 7–6^{(7–2)}, 6–4, 6–4

== Doubles performance timeline ==
Key
W	F	SF	QF	#R	RR	Q#	DNQ	A	NH

(W) winner; (F) finalist; (SF) semifinalist; (QF) quarterfinalist; (#R) rounds 4, 3, 2, 1; (RR) round-robin stage; (Q#) qualification round; (DNQ) did not qualify; (A) absent; (NH) not held; (SR) strike rate (events won / competed); (W–L) win–loss record.

Tournament	1991	1992	1993	1994	1995	1996	1997	1998	1999	2000	2001	2002	2003	Career SR	Career win–loss
Grand Slam tournaments
Australian Open	A	A	A	3R	1R	1R	QF	QF	SF	W	2R	QF	2R	1 / 10	23–9
French Open	A	A	A	2R	2R	1R	2R	1R	QF	1R	3R	1R	A	0 / 9	8–9
Wimbledon	A	A	A	2R	1R	SF	3R	QF	2R	QF	QF	2R	A	0 / 9	18–9
U.S. Open	A	A	A	2R	1R	2R	1R	1R	2R	F	QF	2R	A	0 / 9	12–9
Grand Slam SR	0 / 0	0 / 0	0 / 0	0 / 4	0 / 4	0 / 4	0 / 4	0 / 4	0 / 4	1 / 4	0 / 4	0 / 4	0 / 1	1 / 37	N/A
Annual win–loss	0–0	0–0	0–0	5–4	1–4	5–4	6–4	6–4	9–4	14–3	9–4	5–4	1–1	N/A	61–36
ATP Masters Series
Indian Wells	A	A	A	A	A	QF	2R	2R	F	QF	1R	1R	A	0 / 7	8–7
Miami	A	A	A	1R	A	F	2R	W	3R	3R	QF	2R	A	1 / 8	13–7
Monte Carlo	A	A	A	A	A	W	QF	2R	2R	QF	1R	1R	A	1 / 7	7–5
Rome	A	A	A	A	2R	SF	2R	F	W	2R	QF	A	A	1 / 7	17–6
Hamburg	A	A	A	A	1R	2R	SF	SF	SF	1R	QF	A	A	0 / 7	8–7
Canada	A	A	A	QF	A	A	2R	F	SF	QF	QF	QF	A	0 / 7	14–7
Cincinnati	A	A	A	QF	QF	SF	QF	2R	2R	F	2R	1R	A	0 / 9	15–9
Stuttgart (Stockholm)	A	A	A	A	A	2R	2R	2R	2R	QF	F	2R	A	0 / 7	6–7
Paris	A	A	A	A	A	2R	SF	2R	SF	2R	W	SF	A	1 / 7	12–6
Masters Series SR	0 / 0	0 / 0	0 / 0	0 / 3	0 / 3	1 / 8	0 / 9	1 / 9	1 / 9	0 / 9	1 / 9	0 / 7	0 / 0	4 / 66	N/A
Annual win–loss	0–0	0–0	0–0	4–3	3–3	16–7	7–9	15–7	18–8	13–9	18–8	6–7	0–0	N/A	100–61
Year-end ranking	569	407	137	64	68	13	10	10	13	5	15	52	359	N/A	
