= Marius Barnard (tennis) =

South African tennis player

- Country (sports): South Africa
- Born: 20 January 1969 (age 57) Cape Town, South Africa
- Height: 1.88 m (6 ft 2 in)
- Turned pro: 1988
- Plays: Right-handed
- Prize money: $793,416

Singles
- Career record: 0–3
- Career titles: 0; 0 Challenger, 0 Futures
- Highest ranking: No. 313 (17 October 1994)

Grand Slam singles results
- Australian Open: Q2 (1993)
- French Open: Q2 (1994)
- Wimbledon: Q2 (1994, 1995)
- US Open: Q2 (1992)

Doubles
- Career record: 168–227
- Career titles: 6; 5 Challenger, 0 Futures
- Highest ranking: No. 44 (3 February 1997)

Grand Slam doubles results
- Australian Open: QF (2000)
- French Open: 3R (2000)
- Wimbledon: QF (1994)
- US Open: 3R (2000)

Grand Slam mixed doubles results
- Australian Open: 1R (1997)
- French Open: 2R (1996, 2000)
- Wimbledon: 3R (1997)
- Last updated on: 24 April 2023.

Marius Barnard (born 20 January 1969) is a retired South African tennis player, who delivers Executive Coaching to CEOs, MDs, Directors, and other business leaders. He specialises in shifting mindsets, performance coaching, managing pressure, building self-belief, and utilising Positive Intelligence tools. As a business and psychology graduate, he started coaching tennis players, cricketers, and golfers in 2002. He converted to Executive Coaching in 2019 and became an EMCC Senior Practitioner in March 2021. As a tennis professional, he was more successful in doubles on the ATP Tour and played in Grand Slams for more than a decade. In his career, he won six titles on the ATP Tour, reached eight finals as well as the quarter-finals of Wimbledon and the Australian Open.

== Performance timelines ==
Key
W	F	SF	QF	#R	RR	Q#	DNQ	A	NH

(W) winner; (F) finalist; (SF) semifinalist; (QF) quarterfinalist; (#R) rounds 4, 3, 2, 1; (RR) round-robin stage; (Q#) qualification round; (DNQ) did not qualify; (A) absent; (NH) not held; (SR) strike rate (events won / competed); (W–L) win–loss record.

=== Singles ===
Tournament	1988	1989	1990	1991	1992	1993	1994	1995	1996	SR	W–L	Win %
Grand Slam Tournaments
Australian Open	A	A	A	A	A	Q2	A	A	A	0 / 0	0–0	–
French Open	A	A	A	A	A	A	Q2	A	A	0 / 0	0–0	–
Wimbledon	Q1	A	A	A	Q1	Q1	Q2	Q2	A	0 / 0	0–0	–
US Open	A	A	A	A	Q2	Q1	A	Q1	A	0 / 0	0–0	–
Win–loss	0–0	0–0	0–0	0–0	0–0	0–0	0–0	0–0	0–0	0 / 0	0–0	–
ATP Tour Masters 1000
Miami	A	A	A	A	A	Q1	A	A	A	0 / 0	0–0	–
Hamburg	A	A	A	A	A	A	A	A	Q1	0 / 0	0–0	–
Rome	A	A	A	A	A	A	A	Q2	A	0 / 0	0–0	–
Canada	A	A	A	A	A	A	Q2	Q2	A	0 / 0	0–0	–
Cincinnati	A	A	A	A	Q1	A	A	A	A	0 / 0	0–0	–
Win–loss	0–0	0–0	0–0	0–0	0–0	0–0	0–0	0–0	0–0	0 / 0	0–0	–

=== Doubles ===
Tournament	1988	1989	1990	1991	1992	1993	1994	1995	1996	1997	1998	1999	2000	2001	2002	SR	W–L	Win %
Grand Slam Tournaments
Australian Open	A	A	A	A	A	1R	A	1R	A	1R	1R	1R	QF	1R	2R	0 / 8	4–8	33%
French Open	A	A	A	A	A	1R	2R	2R	1R	1R	1R	1R	3R	2R	1R	0 / 10	5–10	33%
Wimbledon	Q2	A	A	A	Q2	1R	QF	1R	1R	1R	1R	1R	1R	1R	2R	0 / 10	4–10	29%
US Open	A	A	1R	A	A	2R	2R	2R	1R	1R	2R	2R	3R	2R	1R	0 / 11	8–11	42%
Win–loss	0–0	0–0	0–1	0–0	0–0	1–4	5–3	2–4	0–3	0–4	1–4	1–4	7–4	2–4	2–4	0 / 39	21–39	35%
ATP Tour Masters 1000
Indian Wells	A	A	A	A	A	A	A	A	A	A	A	A	1R	Q2	A	0 / 1	0–1	0%
Miami	A	A	A	A	2R	1R	A	A	A	A	A	3R	1R	1R	1R	0 / 6	2–6	25%
Monte Carlo	A	A	A	A	A	A	A	Q1	1R	2R	A	A	A	2R	A	0 / 3	2–3	40%
Hamburg	A	A	A	A	A	A	A	A	1R	Q2	A	1R	A	Q2	A	0 / 2	0–2	0%
Rome	A	A	A	A	A	A	A	QF	2R	1R	A	Q1	Q1	A	1R	0 / 4	3–4	43%
Canada	A	A	A	A	A	A	1R	2R	2R	A	A	1R	1R	A	A	0 / 5	2–5	29%
Cincinnati	A	A	A	A	A	A	A	A	1R	A	A	Q1	2R	A	A	0 / 2	1–2	33%
Paris	A	A	A	A	A	A	A	A	Q2	A	A	Q1	1R	A	A	0 / 1	0–1	0%
Win–loss	0–0	0–0	0–0	0–0	0–1	0–1	0–1	3–2	2–5	1–2	0–0	2–3	1–5	1–2	0–2	0 / 24	10–24	29%

== ATP career finals ==
=== Doubles: 14 (6 titles, 8 runner-ups) ===
Legend Grand Slam Tournaments (0–0) ATP World Tour Finals (0–0) ATP Masters Series (0–0) ATP Championship Series (0–0) ATP International Series (6–8)	Finals by surface Hard (3–4) Clay (0–1) Grass (1–2) Carpet (2–1)	Finals by setting Outdoors (4–6) Indoors (2–2)

Result	W–L	Date	Tournament	Tier	Surface	Partner	Opponents	Score
Win	1–0	Nov 1992	Moscow, Russia	World Series	Carpet	(South Africa) John-Laffnie de Jager	(Russia) Andrei Olhovskiy (South Africa) David Adams	6–3, 3–6, 7–6
Loss	1–1	Aug 1993	Kitzbühel, Austria	World Series	Clay	(United States) Tom Mercer	(Argentina) Juan-Ignacio Garat (Argentina) Roberto Saad	4–6, 6–3, 3–6
Win	2–1	Apr 1994	Sun City, South Africa	World Series	Hard	(South Africa) Brent Haygarth	(South Africa) Ellis Ferreira (South Africa) Grant Stafford	6–3, 7–5
Loss	2–2	Feb 1996	Marseille, France	World Series	Hard	(Sweden) Peter Nyborg	(France) Jean-Philippe Fleurian (France) Guillaume Raoux	3–6, 2–6
Win	3–2	Mar 1996	Rotterdam, Netherlands	World Series	Carpet	(South Africa) David Adams	(Netherlands) Hendrik-Jan Davids (Czech Republic) Cyril Suk	6–3, 5–7, 7–6
Win	4–2	Jul 1996	Bucharest, United States	World Series	Grass	(South Africa) Piet Norval	(Australia) Paul Kilderry (Australia) Michael Tebbutt	6–7, 6–4, 6–4
Win	5–2	Aug 1996	Los Angeles, United States	World Series	Hard	(South Africa) Piet Norval	(Sweden) Jonas Björkman (Sweden) Nicklas Kulti	7–5, 6–2
Loss	5–3	Jun 1997	Halle, Germany	World Series	Grass	(South Africa) David Adams	(Germany) Karsten Braasch (Germany) Michael Stich	6–7, 2–6
Loss	5–4	Feb 1998	St. Petersburg, Russia	World Series	Carpet	(South Africa) Brent Haygarth	(Sweden) Nicklas Kulti (Sweden) Mikael Tillström	6–3, 3–6, 6–7
Loss	5–5	Jun 1999	Nottingham, United Kingdom	World Series	Grass	(South Africa) Brent Haygarth	(United States) Patrick Galbraith (United States) Justin Gimelstob	7–5, 5–7, 3–6
Loss	5–6	Aug 1999	Boston, United States	World Series	Hard	(United States) T. J. Middleton	(Argentina) Guillermo Cañas (Argentina) Martín García	7–5, 6–7^{(2–7)}, 3–6
Loss	5–7	Sep 2000	Tashkent, Uzbekistan	International Series	Hard	(South Africa) Robbie Koenig	(United States) Justin Gimelstob (United States) Scott Humphries	3–6, 2–6
Win	6–7	Jan 2001	Auckland, New Zealand	International Series	Hard	(United States) Jim Thomas	(South Africa) David Adams (Argentina) Martín García	7–6^{(12–10)}, 6–4
Loss	6–8	Sep 2001	Tashkent, Uzbekistan	International Series	Hard	(United States) Jim Thomas	(France) Julien Boutter (Slovakia) Dominik Hrbatý	4–6, 6–3, [11–13]

== ATP Challenger and ITF Futures finals ==
=== Doubles: 9 (5–4) ===
Legend ATP Challenger (5–4) ITF Futures (0–0)	Finals by surface Hard (3–3) Clay (1–0) Grass (0–0) Carpet (1–1)

Result	W–L	Date	Tournament	Tier	Surface	Partner	Opponents	Score
Win	1–0	Apr 1990	Cape Town, South Africa	Challenger	Carpet	(United Kingdom) Jeremy Bates	(South Africa) Wayne Ferreira (South Africa) Pieter Norval	6–3, 6–1
Loss	1–1	Jul 1990	Aptos, United States	Challenger	Hard	(United States) Matt Anger	(United States) Jeff Brown (United States) Scott Melville	7–6, 4–6, 4–6
Win	2–1	Nov 1992	Brest, France	Challenger	Hard	(South Africa) Brent Haygarth	(Latvia) Ģirts Dzelde (Norway) Bent-Ove Pedersen	6–2, 7–6
Loss	2–2	May 1993	Kuala Lumpur, Malaysia	Challenger	Hard	(Netherlands) Joost Winnink	(Australia) Joshua Eagle (Australia) Andrew Florent	4–6, 4–6
Loss	2–3	Feb 1994	Lippstadt, Germany	Challenger	Carpet	(South Africa) Brent Haygarth	(Germany) Alexander Mronz (Germany) Arne Thoms	2–6, 4–6
Loss	2–4	Feb 1995	Cherbourg, France	Challenger	Hard	(South Africa) Stefan Kruger	(United States) Bill Behrens (United States) Matt Lucena	6–7, 1–6
Win	3–4	May 1995	Valletta, Malta	Challenger	Hard	(France) Lionel Barthez	(Germany) Patrick Baur (Czech Republic) Tomas Anzari	7–5, 6–3
Win	4–4	Feb 1996	Cherbourg, France	Challenger	Hard	(United States) Bill Behrens	(Portugal) João Cunha Silva (Germany) Mathias Huning	6–2, 4–6, 6–3
Win	5–4	May 1998	Ljubljana, Slovenia	Challenger	Clay	(Netherlands) Stephen Noteboom	(Spain) Alberto Martín (Czech Republic) Tomáš Anzari	7–6, 6–7, 7–6
