= Brent Haygarth =

South African tennis player

- Country (sports): /South Africa
- Born: 27 December 1967 (age 58) Durban, South Africa
- Height: 1.85 m (6 ft 1 in)
- Plays: Right-handed
- Prize money: $624,649

Singles
- Career record: 0–1
- Career titles: 0
- Highest ranking: No. 384 (16 July 1990)

Other tournaments

Doubles
- Career record: 149–211
- Career titles: 6
- Highest ranking: No. 40 (11 October 1999)

Grand Slam doubles results
- Australian Open: 2R (1999)
- French Open: 2R (1994, 1995, 1996, 2001)
- Wimbledon: QF (1994)
- US Open: QF (1999)

Brent Haygarth (born 27 December 1967) is a former professional tennis player from South Africa. He enjoyed most of his success in doubles, winning six doubles titles and finishing runner-up six more times. His highest doubles ranking was No. 40 in 1999. He is the son of Renée Schuurman.

== Career finals ==
=== Doubles (6 wins, 6 losses) ===
Result	W/L	Date	Tournament	Surface	Partner	Opponents	Score
Loss	0–1	Jun 1992	Florence, Italy	Clay	(South Africa) Royce Deppe	(Uruguay) Marcelo Filippini (Brazil) Luiz Mattar	4–6, 7–6, 4–6
Win	1–1	Mar 1994	Sun City, South Africa	Hard	(South Africa) Marius Barnard	(South Africa) Ellis Ferreira (South Africa) Grant Stafford	6–3, 7–5
Win	2–1	Aug 1995	Los Angeles, U.S.	Hard	(United States) Kent Kinnear	(United States) Scott Davis (Croatia) Goran Ivanišević	6–4, 7–6
Win	3–1	Apr 1996	Bermuda	Clay	(Sweden) Jan Apell	(Australia) Pat Cash (Australia) Patrick Rafter	3–6, 6–1, 6–3
Win	4–1	Jun 1996	Bologna, Italy	Clay	(South Africa) Christo van Rensburg	(Morocco) Karim Alami (Hungary) Gábor Köves	6–1, 6–4
Loss	4–2	Jan 1997	Zagreb, Croatia	Carpet	(United States) Mark Keil	(Croatia) Saša Hiršzon (Croatia) Goran Ivanišević	4–6, 3–6
Loss	4–3	Feb 1998	St. Petersburg, Russia	Carpet	(South Africa) Marius Barnard	(Sweden) Nicklas Kulti (Sweden) Mikael Tillström	6–3, 3–6, 6–7
Win	5–3	Apr 1998	Atlanta, U.S.	Clay	(South Africa) Ellis Ferreira	(United States) Alex O'Brien (United States) Richey Reneberg	6–3, 0–6, 6–2
Loss	5–4	May 1999	St. Poelten, Austria	Clay	(South Africa) Robbie Koenig	(Australia) Andrew Florent (Russia) Andrei Olhovskiy	7–5, 4–6, 5–7
Loss	5–5	Jun 1999	Nottingham, England	Grass	(South Africa) Marius Barnard	(United States) Patrick Galbraith (United States) Justin Gimelstob	7–5, 5–7, 3–6
Win	6–5	Oct 1999	Basel, Switzerland	Carpet	(North Macedonia) Aleksandar Kitinov	(Czech Republic) Jiří Novák (Czech Republic) David Rikl	0–6, 6–4, 7–5
Loss	6–6	Sep 2001	Costa Do Sauipe, Brazil	Hard	(Argentina) Gastón Etlis	(Italy) Enzo Artoni (Brazil) Daniel Melo	3–6, 6–1, 6–7
