= Chris Wilkinson =

British tennis player (born 1970)

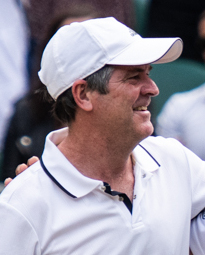
- Wilkinson in 2019
- Country (sports): (United Kingdom) Great Britain
- Residence: Rowland's Castle, Hampshire, England
- Born: 5 January 1970 (age 56) Southampton, Hampshire, England
- Height: 1.80 m (5 ft 11 in)
- Turned pro: 1989
- Retired: 1999
- Plays: Right-handed (one-handed backhand)
- Prize money: $631,641

Singles
- Career record: 28–52
- Career titles: 0
- Highest ranking: No. 114 (13 September 1993)

Grand Slam singles results
- Australian Open: 1R (1994)
- French Open: Q1 (1993, 1996, 1997, 1998, 1999)
- Wimbledon: 3R (1993, 1994, 1995, 1998)
- US Open: Q2 (1996)

Other tournaments
- Olympic Games: 1R (1992)

Doubles
- Career record: 19–38
- Career titles: 0
- Highest ranking: No. 86 (16 February 1998)

Grand Slam doubles results
- Australian Open: 1R (1998)
- French Open: 2R (1998)
- Wimbledon: QF (1993)

Grand Slam mixed doubles results
- Wimbledon: 2R (1993, 1998)
- Last updated on: 6 February 2022.

Christopher Wilkinson (born 5 January 1970) is a former tennis player from England.

== Career ==
Born and bred in Southampton, Chris Wilkinson has achieved much in the world of tennis. But it could have been very different as his first passion was football in which he excelled for Southampton and had trials for Aston Villa and Coventry. Wilkinson started his winning ways with tennis tournament success as a 10-year-old junior. From there Wilkinson went on to win national and overseas tournaments and represented Great Britain in the World Championships at all junior age groups.

On the main Tour Wilkinson played some of his best tennis at Wimbledon where he reached the 3rd round in Singles on four occasions and made the quarter finals of Doubles. Wilkinson had the privilege of playing on Centre and No. 1 court on many occasions. He will probably be best remembered for his Centre Court battle in 1993 against Stefan Edberg, in which he broke the champion's serve no less than seven times before faltering on his own and succumbing to defeat in three close sets. His best win was over Goran Ivanišević in 1993 at Queen's. Wilkinson has recorded many notable wins over several top 20 world ranked players. Wimbledon continues to be a special place for the former British No. 1 and he is regularly invited to compete in the Gentleman's senior invitational event.

In 1993 Wilkinson achieved his ambition of becoming British No. 1 Singles player. He represented Great Britain in the Davis Cup and the 1992 Barcelona Olympics. Wilkinson retired from the main tour in 1999 but kept up his competitive play in the following years and in 2005 became the British and world over-35 champion.

Wilkinson is still very much involved with the sport, working with the LTA as a National Performance Coach/captain for the 12 to 16-year-old boys. In February 2018, he was appointed as County Performance Manager for Hampshire and Isle of Wight LTA.

Wilkinson also remains very busy in the media world, including TV commentating for Eurosport, ATP media and ITV4. He also has a regular column with ESPN.

As for playing tennis, Wilkinson is regularly invited to exhibition events where he often plays with some of the all-time greats of the tennis world.

Wilkinson currently resides in Hampshire with his wife Amanda and their two daughters, Alice born in 1998 and Emily born in 2001.

In 1984 he featured in an advert shown in the UK and Ireland for Bisto gravy.

== ATP career finals ==
=== Doubles: 2 (2 runner-ups) ===
Legend Grand Slam Tournaments (0–0) ATP World Tour Finals (0–0) ATP Masters Series (0–0) ATP Championship Series (0–0) ATP World Series (0–2)	Finals by surface Hard (0–0) Clay (0–1) Grass (0–1) Carpet (0–0)	Finals by setting Outdoors (0–2) Indoors (0–0)

Result	W–L	Date	Tournament	Tier	Surface	Partner	Opponents	Score
Loss	0–1	Jun 1997	Nottingham, United Kingdom	World Series	Grass	(United Kingdom) Danny Sapsford	(South Africa) Ellis Ferreira (United States) Patrick Galbraith	6–4, 6–7, 6–7
Loss	0–2	Sep 1997	Bournemouth, United Kingdom	World Series	Clay	(Spain) Alberto Martín	(United States) Kent Kinnear (North Macedonia) Aleksandar Kitinov	6–7, 2–6

== ATP Challenger and ITF Futures finals ==
=== Singles: 8 (3–5) ===
Legend ATP Challenger (3–5) ITF Futures (0–0)	Finals by surface Hard (1–3) Clay (0–0) Grass (2–1) Carpet (0–1)

Result	W–L	Date	Tournament	Tier	Surface	Opponent	Score
Win	1–0	Nov 1992	Kuala Lumpur, Malaysia	Challenger	Hard	(The Bahamas) Roger Smith	6–3, 6–1
Loss	1–1	Aug 1993	Bronx, United States	Challenger	Hard	(France) Jean-Philippe Fleurian	6–3, 5–7, 2–6
Loss	1–2	Sep 1994	Singapore, Singapore	Challenger	Hard	(United States) Tommy Ho	3–6, 4–6
Loss	1–3	Feb 1995	Hambühren, Germany	Challenger	Carpet	(Slovakia) Ján Krošlák	6–7, 3–6
Win	2–3	Jul 1995	Manchester, United Kingdom	Challenger	Grass	(Germany) Christian Saceanu	6–4, 6–4
Loss	2–4	Oct 1995	Charleroi, Belgium	Challenger	Hard	(Spain) Juan-Luis Rascon-Lope	7–6, 3–6, 6–7
Win	3–4	Jul 1998	Manchester, United Kingdom	Challenger	Grass	(Italy) Stefano Pescosolido	6–3, 6–4
Loss	3–5	Jul 1999	Bristol, United Kingdom	Challenger	Grass	(Netherlands) Raemon Sluiter	3–6, 7–6, 6–7

=== Doubles: 15 (7–8) ===
Legend ATP Challenger (7–7) ITF Futures (0–1)	Finals by surface Hard (5–3) Clay (0–1) Grass (0–0) Carpet (2–4)

Result	W–L	Date	Tournament	Tier	Surface	Partner	Opponents	Score
Cancelled	0–0	Jul 1993	Bristol, United Kingdom	Challenger	Grass	(United Kingdom) Paul Hand	(United Kingdom) Jeremy Bates (United Kingdom) Mark Petchey	6–7, 6–4, abandoned
Win	1–0	Oct 1993	Gothenburg, Sweden	Challenger	Hard	(United Kingdom) Jeremy Bates	(United Kingdom) Andrew Foster (United Kingdom) Ross Matheson	7–6, 6–3
Win	2–0	Sep 1994	Azores, Portugal	Challenger	Hard	(United Kingdom) Danny Sapsford	(Portugal) Emanuel Couto (Israel) Eyal Ran	7–5, 6–1
Win	3–0	Oct 1994	Dublin, Ireland	Challenger	Carpet	(United Kingdom) Danny Sapsford	(Germany) Arne Thoms (Netherlands) Fernon Wibier	7–6, 2–6, 6–3
Loss	3–1	Feb 1995	Hambühren, Germany	Challenger	Carpet	(Australia) Brent Larkham	(United States) Bret Garnett (United States) T. J. Middleton	2–6, 0–3 ret.
Loss	3–2	Sep 1995	Azores, Portugal	Challenger	Hard	(Portugal) Nuno Marques	(United Kingdom) Tim Henman (Germany) Christian Saceanu	2–6, 2–6
Win	4–2	Sep 1995	Singapore, Singapore	Challenger	Hard	(Germany) Martin Zumpft	(Italy) Nicola Bruno (Italy) Mosé Navarra	4–6, 6–1, 6–4
Loss	4–3	Aug 1996	Bronx, United States	Challenger	Hard	(South Africa) Chris Haggard	(United States) David Di Lucia (United States) Scott Humphries	4–6, 1–6
Loss	4–4	Feb 1997	Lübeck, Germany	Challenger	Carpet	(United States) Trey Phillips	(Germany) Mathias Huning (Netherlands) Joost Winnink	6–7, 6–7
Win	5–4	Mar 1997	Magdeburg, Germany	Challenger	Carpet	(United States) Trey Phillips	(Czech Republic) Tomas Anzari (Czech Republic) Petr Luxa	6–3, 6–4
Win	6–4	Nov 1997	Portorož, Slovenia	Challenger	Hard	(United Kingdom) Danny Sapsford	(Croatia) Saša Hiršzon (Austria) Udo Plamberger	6–0, 3–6, 6–3
Loss	6–5	Mar 1998	Magdeburg, Germany	Challenger	Carpet	(South Africa) Marcos Ondruska	(Israel) Eyal Erlich (Italy) Mosé Navarra	6–4, 1–6, 4–6
Loss	6–6	Aug 1998	Istanbul, Turkey	Challenger	Hard	(Australia) Todd Larkham	(Israel) Eyal Ran (Czech Republic) Petr Luxa	4–6, 6–7
Loss	6–7	Sep 1998	Edinburgh, United Kingdom	Challenger	Clay	(South Africa) Marcos Ondruska	(Netherlands) Peter Wessels (Netherlands) Edwin Kempes	7–6, 3–6, 2–6
Win	7–7	Oct 1998	Olbia, Italy	Challenger	Hard	(Australia) Todd Larkham	(Japan) Thomas Shimada (Switzerland) Filippo Veglio	3–6, 6–3, 7–6
Loss	7–8	Apr 1999	France F3, Melun	Futures	Carpet	(United Kingdom) Tom Spinks	(North Macedonia) Aleksandar Kitinov (Austria) Gerald Mandl	3–6, 2–6

== Performance timelines ==
Key
W	F	SF	QF	#R	RR	Q#	DNQ	A	NH

(W) winner; (F) finalist; (SF) semifinalist; (QF) quarterfinalist; (#R) rounds 4, 3, 2, 1; (RR) round-robin stage; (Q#) qualification round; (DNQ) did not qualify; (A) absent; (NH) not held; (SR) strike rate (events won / competed); (W–L) win–loss record.

=== Singles ===
Tournament	1988	1989	1990	1991	1992	1993	1994	1995	1996	1997	1998	1999	SR	W–L	Win %
Grand Slam tournaments
Australian Open	A	A	A	A	A	A	1R	A	A	A	Q1	A	0 / 1	0–1	0%
French Open	A	A	A	A	A	Q1	A	A	Q1	Q1	Q1	Q1	0 / 0	0–0	–
Wimbledon	Q2	A	Q3	1R	2R	3R	3R	3R	2R	2R	3R	1R	0 / 9	11–9	55%
US Open	A	A	A	A	A	Q1	A	Q1	Q2	A	A	A	0 / 0	0–0	–
Win–loss	0–0	0–0	0–0	0–1	1–1	2–1	2–2	2–1	1–1	1–1	2–1	0–1	0 / 10	11–10	52%
Olympic Games
Summer Olympics	A	Not Held			1R	Not Held			A	Not Held			0 / 1	0–1	0%
ATP Tour Masters 1000
Miami	A	A	A	A	A	A	1R	A	1R	A	Q1	A	0 / 2	0–2	0%
Canada	A	A	A	A	A	1R	A	A	A	A	A	A	0 / 1	0–1	0%
Cincinnati	A	A	A	A	A	Q2	A	A	A	A	A	A	0 / 0	0–0	–
Stuttgart	A	A	A	A	A	A	A	A	Q2	A	A	A	0 / 0	0–0	–
Win–loss	0–0	0–0	0–0	0–0	0–0	0–1	0–1	0–0	0–1	0–0	0–0	0–0	0 / 3	0–3	0%

=== Doubles ===
Tournament	1990	1991	1992	1993	1994	1995	1996	1997	1998	1999	SR	W–L	Win %
Grand Slam tournaments
Australian Open	A	A	A	A	A	A	A	A	1R	A	0 / 1	0–1	0%
French Open	A	A	A	A	A	A	A	A	2R	A	0 / 1	1–1	50%
Wimbledon	1R	1R	1R	QF	1R	1R	2R	1R	1R	1R	0 / 10	4–10	29%
US Open	A	A	A	A	A	A	A	A	A	A	0 / 0	0–0	–
Win–loss	0–1	0–1	0–1	3–1	0–1	0–1	1–1	0–1	1–3	0–1	0 / 12	5–12	29%
Olympic Games
Summer Olympics	NH		1R	Not Held			A	Not Held			0 / 1	0–1	0%
ATP Tour Masters 1000
Canada	A	A	A	2R	A	A	A	A	A	A	0 / 1	1–1	50%
Win–loss	0–0	0–0	0–0	1–1	0–0	0–0	0–0	0–0	0–0	0–0	0 / 1	1–1	50%
