= 1990 DHL Singapore Open – Singles =

Singles
- 1990 DHL Singapore Open

Final
- Champion: (Japan) Naoko Sawamatsu
- Runner-up: (United Kingdom) Sarah Loosemore
- Score: 7–6^{(7–5)}, 3–6, 6–4

Details
- Draw: 56 (8Q)
- Seeds: 16

Events
Singles	Doubles
← 1989 ·	WTA Singapore Open	· 1994 →

Belinda Cordwell was the defending champion, but lost in the second round to Patricia Hy.

Naoko Sawamatsu won the title by defeating Sarah Loosemore 7–6^{(7–5)}, 3–6, 6–4 in the final.

== Seeds ==
The first eight seeds received a bye to the second round.

1. (Australia) Anne Minter (third round)
2. (United States) Betsy Nagelsen (third round)
3. (New Zealand) Belinda Cordwell (second round)
4. (Japan) Etsuko Inoue (second round)
5. (Japan) Akiko Kijimuta (second round)
6. (Australia) Jo-Anne Faull (second round)
7. (Belgium) Sandra Wasserman (third round)
8. (Belgium) Sabine Appelmans (semifinals)
9. (United States) Marianne Werdel (quarterfinals)
10. (United States) Hu Na (third round)
11. (United Kingdom) Monique Javer (third round)
12. (Japan) Maya Kidowaki (semifinals)
13. (Australia) Louise Field (third round)
14. (Switzerland) Eva Krapl (second round)
15. (France) Pascale Paradis (second round)
16. (West Germany) Martina Pawlik (second round)

== Draw ==
=== Key ===
- Q = Qualifier
- WC = Wild card
- LL = Lucky loser
- Alt = Alternate
- SE = Special exempt
- PR = Protected ranking
- ITF = ITF entry
- JE = Junior exempt
- w/o = Walkover
- r = Retired
- d = Defaulted
- SR = Special ranking

=== Finals ===
Quarterfinals
(Peru) Pilar Vásquez	2	3
12	(Japan) Maya Kidowaki	6	6
(Japan) Tamaka Takagi	1	3
(Japan) Naoko Sawamatsu	6	6
(United Kingdom) Sarah Loosemore	6	6
(Hong Kong) Patricia Hy	3	4
8	(Belgium) Sabine Appelmans	7	3	6
9	(United States) Marianne Werdel	5	6	3

Semifinals
12	(Japan) Maya Kidowaki	6	6	3
(Japan) Naoko Sawamatsu	4	7	6
(United Kingdom) Sarah Loosemore	5	6	6
8	(Belgium) Sabine Appelmans	7	2	3

Final
(Japan) Naoko Sawamatsu	7^{7}	3	6
(United Kingdom) Sarah Loosemore	6^{5}	6	4

=== Top half ===
==== Section 1 ====
First round
(United States) H Ludloff	7	1	6
(United Kingdom) C Wood	5	6	4
(Peru) P Vásquez	6	6
Q	(United States) L Antonoplis	4	3
Q	(Australia) KA Guse	0	1
14	(Switzerland) E Krapl	6	6
12	(Japan) M Kidowaki	6	7
(France) C Suire	4	5
(United Kingdom) B Borneo	4	6	3
(Japan) Y Koizumi	6	4	6
(Australia) M Jaggard	6	3	6
(Austria) B Reinstadler	3	6	3

Second round
1	(Australia) A Minter	6	6
(United States) H Ludloff	3	2
(Peru) P Vásquez	6	6
14	(Switzerland) E Krapl	3	3
12	(Japan) M Kidowaki	6	6
(Japan) Y Koizumi	2	2
(Australia) M Jaggard	6	6
5	(Japan) A Kijimuta	2	1

Third round
1	(Australia) A Minter	4	4
(Peru) P Vásquez	6	6
12	(Japan) M Kidowaki	6	6
(Australia) M Jaggard	3	2

Quarterfinals
(Peru) P Vásquez	2	3
12	(Japan) M Kidowaki	6	6

==== Section 2 ====
First round
Q	(United States) A May	2	1
(Japan) T Takagi	6	6
(United Kingdom) J Durie	6	6	6
(Finland) P Thorén	2	7	2
(Japan) E Okagawa	3	1
10	(United States) N Hu	6	6
15	(France) P Paradis	6	5	6
(Germany) S Frankl	1	7	3
Q	(United States) S Bartlett	0	2
(Japan) N Sawamatsu	6	6
(France) S Amiach	1	6	7
(Australia) T Morton	6	4	6

Second round
4	(Japan) E Inoue	3	6	1
(Japan) T Takagi	6	1	6
(United Kingdom) J Durie	2	3
10	(United States) N Hu	6	6
15	(France) P Paradis	6	4	3
(Japan) N Sawamatsu	3	6	6
(France) S Amiach	3	2
7	(Belgium) S Wasserman	6	6

Third round
(Japan) T Takagi	2	6	6
10	(United States) N Hu	6	3	3
(Japan) N Sawamatsu	6	6	6
7	(Belgium) S Wasserman	2	7	4

Quarterfinals
(Japan) T Takagi	1	3
(Japan) N Sawamatsu	6	6

=== Bottom half ===
==== Section 3 ====
First round
(United States) A Ivan	1	5
(New Zealand) C Toleafoa	6	7
(Czechoslovakia) J Strnadová	3	4
(United Kingdom) S Loosemore	6	6
(New Zealand) J Richardson	4	6	6
16	(West Germany) M Pawlik	6	4	7
13	(Australia) L Field	6	6
(Canada) J Hetherington	4	2
Q	(United States) L Bartlett	6	6	7
Q	(Japan) M Miyauchi	3	7	5
(Hong Kong) P Hy	6	6
(Argentina) A Villagrán	1	2

Second round
6	(Australia) JA Faull	4	4
(New Zealand) C Toleafoa	6	6
(United Kingdom) S Loosemore	6	6
16	(West Germany) M Pawlik	0	1
13	(Australia) L Field	6	6
Q	(United States) L Bartlett	4	2
(Hong Kong) P Hy	6	7
3	(New Zealand) B Cordwell	2	6

Third round
(New Zealand) C Toleafoa	7	4	2
(United Kingdom) S Loosemore	5	6	6
13	(Australia) L Field	6	3	5
(Hong Kong) P Hy	3	6	7

Quarterfinals
(United Kingdom) S Loosemore	6	6
(Hong Kong) P Hy	3	4

==== Section 4 ====
First round
(United Kingdom) A Simpkin	4	6	2
Q	(Australia) D Jones	6	4	6
(Sweden) M Lindström	6	2	1
(Australia) M Bowrey	4	6	6
(Australia) K Godridge	4	0
11	(United Kingdom) M Javer	6	6
9	(United States) M Werdel	6	6
(Australia) R Stubbs	3	3
(Bulgaria) M Maleeva	6	6
Q	(Hong Kong) P Moreno	0	4
(Brazil) T Zambrzycki	0	4
(United States) L Allen	6	6

Second round
8	(Belgium) S Appelmans	6	6
Q	(Australia) D Jones	4	1
(Australia) M Bowrey	4	3
11	(United Kingdom) M Javer	6	6
9	(United States) M Werdel	5	6	6
(Bulgaria) M Maleeva	7	0	0
(United States) L Allen	4	3
2	(United States) B Nagelsen	6	6

Third round
8	(Belgium) S Appelmans	6	3	7
11	(United Kingdom) M Javer	3	6	5
9	(United States) M Werdel	6	6
2	(United States) B Nagelsen	2	3

Quarterfinals
8	(Belgium) S Appelmans	7	3	6
9	(United States) M Werdel	5	6	3
