= 1990 DHL Singapore Open – Doubles =

Doubles
- 1990 DHL Singapore Open

Final
- Champions: (United Kingdom) Jo Durie (Canada) Jill Hetherington
- Runners-up: (France) Pascale Paradis (France) Catherine Suire
- Score: 6–4, 6–1

Details
- Draw: 28
- Seeds: 8

Events
| Singles | Doubles |
| ← 1989 · | WTA Singapore Open | · 1994 → |

Belinda Cordwell and Elizabeth Smylie were the defending champions, but none competed this year.

Jo Durie and Jill Hetherington won the title by defeating Pascale Paradis and Catherine Suire 6–4, 6–1 in the final.

== Seeds ==
The first four seeds received a bye to the second round.

1. (Australia) Anne Minter / (Australia) Wendy Turnbull (second round)
2. (Sweden) Maria Lindström / (United States) Heather Ludloff (semifinals)
3. (United Kingdom) Jo Durie / (Canada) Jill Hetherington (champions)
4. (Australia) Michelle Jaggard / (New Zealand) Julie Richardson (quarterfinals)
5. (Australia) Jo-Anne Faull / (Australia) Rennae Stubbs (quarterfinals)
6. (United States) Louise Allen / (France) Sophie Amiach (second round)
7. (Japan) Maya Kidowaki / (United States) Hu Na (quarterfinals)
8. (Australia) Louise Field / (United States) Alysia May (second round)

== Draw ==
=== Key ===
- Q = Qualifier
- WC = Wild card
- LL = Lucky loser
- Alt = Alternate
- SE = Special exempt
- PR = Protected ranking
- ITF = ITF entry
- JE = Junior exempt
- w/o = Walkover
- r = Retired
- d = Defaulted
- SR = Special ranking

=== Finals ===
Semifinals
(Switzerland) Eva Krapl (United States) Marianne Werdel | 5 | 4
3 | (United Kingdom) Jo Durie (Canada) Jill Hetherington | 7 | 6
(France) Pascale Paradis (France) Catherine Suire | 6 | 3 | 7
2 | (Sweden) Maria Lindström (United States) Heather Ludloff | 4 | 6 | 5

Final
3 | (United Kingdom) Jo Durie (Canada) Jill Hetherington | 6 | 6
(France) Pascale Paradis (France) Catherine Suire | 4 | 1

=== Top half ===
First round
(Czechoslovakia) J Strnadová (Finland) P Thorén | 4 | 2
(Switzerland) E Krapl (United States) M Werdel | 6 | 6
(United States) L Antonoplis (United States) J Thomas | 6 | 3
(Hong Kong) P Hy (Japan) E Inoue | 7 | 6
(United Kingdom) S Loosemore (United Kingdom) A Simpkin | 3 | 0
7 | (Japan) M Kidowaki (United States) N Hu | 6 | 6
(Australia) D Jones (Hong Kong) P Moreno | 4 | 7 | 7
(United States) L Bartlett (United States) S Bartlett | 6 | 6 | 5
(Australia) M Bourey (New Zealand) C Toleafoa | 1 | 6 | 3
(Belgium) S Appelmans (Belgium) S Wasserman | 6 | 4 | 6
(Singapore) Laura Liong (Singapore) Norzahara Zainal | 1 | 0
6 | (United States) L Allen (France) S Amiach | 6 | 6

Second round
1 | (Australia) A Minter (Australia) W Turnbull | 4 | 6 | 1
(Switzerland) E Krapl (United States) M Werdel | 6 | 2 | 6
(Hong Kong) P Hy (Japan) E Inoue | 6 | 5 | 4
7 | (Japan) M Kidowaki (United States) N Hu | 4 | 7 | 6
3 | (United Kingdom) J Durie (Canada) J Hetherington | 6 | 6
(Australia) D Jones (Hong Kong) P Moreno | 3 | 4
(Belgium) S Appelmans (Belgium) S Wasserman | 3 | 7 | 6
6 | (United States) L Allen (France) S Amiach | 6 | 5 | 2

Quarterfinals
(Switzerland) E Krapl (United States) M Werdel | 6 | 6
7 | (Japan) M Kidowaki (United States) N Hu | 3 | 1
3 | (United Kingdom) J Durie (Canada) J Hetherington | w/o
(Belgium) S Appelmans (Belgium) S Wasserman

Semifinals
(Switzerland) E Krapl (United States) M Werdel | 5 | 4
3 | (United Kingdom) J Durie (Canada) J Hetherington | 7 | 6

=== Bottom half ===
First round
8 | (Australia) L Field (United States) A May | 6 | 6
(Australia) KA Guse (United States) A Ivan | 4 | 2
(France) P Paradis (France) C Suire | 6 | 2 | 6
(Australia) K Godridge (Japan) M Miyauchi | 1 | 6 | 3
(United Kingdom) B Borneo (United Kingdom) C Wood | 6 | 4 | 7
(Republic of Ireland) L O'Halloran (Brazil) T Zambrzycki | 2 | 6 | 6
5 | (Australia) JA Faull (Australia) R Stubbs | 6 | 4 | 6
(Japan) A Kijimuta (Japan) Y Koizumi | 2 | 6 | 3
(Peru) P Vásquez (Argentina) A Villagrán | 5 | 6 | 3
(Japan) E Okagawa (Japan) N Sato | 7 | 3 | 6
(West Germany) S Frankl (Japan) T Takagi | 5 | 6 | 1
(Australia) T Morton (Austria) B Reinstadler | 7 | 3 | 6

Second round
8 | (Australia) L Field (United States) A May | 2 | 6 | 3
(France) P Paradis (France) C Suire | 6 | 3 | 6
(United Kingdom) B Borneo (United Kingdom) C Wood | 6 | 2
4 | (Australia) M Jaggard (New Zealand) J Richardson | 7 | 6
5 | (Australia) JA Faull (Australia) R Stubbs | 6 | 6
(Japan) E Okagawa (Japan) N Sato | 2 | 1
(Australia) T Morton (Austria) B Reinstadler | 3 | 6
2 | (Sweden) M Lindström (United States) H Ludloff | 6 | 7

Quarterfinals
(France) P Paradis (France) C Suire | 6 | 6
4 | (Australia) M Jaggard (New Zealand) J Richardson | 3 | 2
5 | (Australia) JA Faull (Australia) R Stubbs | 2 | 2
2 | (Sweden) M Lindström (United States) H Ludloff | 6 | 6

Semifinals
(France) P Paradis (France) C Suire | 6 | 3 | 7
2 | (Sweden) M Lindström (United States) H Ludloff | 4 | 6 | 5
