= Singapore Open =

The Singapore Open can refer to several sporting events bearing the same name, or at least in part:

- Singapore Open (badminton)
- Singapore Open (bowling)
- Singapore Open (darts)
- Singapore Open (golf)
- Singapore Open (table tennis)
- Singapore Open Scrabble Championship
- Singapore Open Championships
- ATP Singapore Open, a men's tennis tournament held from 1989 to 1993 and again from 1996 to 1999.
- WTA Singapore Open, a women's tennis tournament held from 1986 to 1990 and again in 1994, and from 2025 onwards.
