= 1989 DHL Open =

- Date: 10–16 April
- Edition: 4th
- Category: Category 1
- Draw: 32S / 16D
- Prize money: $75,000
- Surface: Hard / outdoor
- Location: Singapore
- Venue: Kallang Tennis Centre

Champions

Singles
- (New Zealand) Belinda Cordwell

Doubles
- (New Zealand) Belinda Cordwell / (Australia) Elizabeth Smylie
← 1988 ·	WTA Singapore Open	· 1990 →

The 1989 DHL Open was a women's tennis tournament played on outdoor hard courts at the Kallang Tennis Centre in Singapore and was part of the Category 1 tier of the 1989 Virginia Slims World Championship Series. The tournament took place from 10 April through 16 April 1989. Second-seeded Belinda Cordwell won the singles title and earned $12,000 first-prize money.

== Finals ==
=== Singles ===
(New Zealand) Belinda Cordwell defeated (Japan) Akiko Kijimuta 6–1, 6–0

- It was Cordwell's only singles title of her career.

=== Doubles ===
(New Zealand) Belinda Cordwell / (Australia) Elizabeth Smylie defeated (United States) Ann Henricksson / (United States) Beth Herr 6–7^{(6–8)}, 6–2, 6–1

- It was Cordwell's 2nd title of the year and the 3rd of her career. It was Smylie's 2nd title of the year and the 23rd of her career.

== See also ==
- 1989 Singapore Open - men's tournament
