= 1990 Epson Singapore Super Tennis =

1990 Singapore Open tennis tournament

- Date: 30 April – 6 May
- Edition: 2nd
- Category: World Series
- Draw: 32S / 16D
- Prize money: $225,000
- Surface: Hard / outdoor
- Location: Singapore
- Venue: National Stadium

Champions

Singles
- (United States) Kelly Jones

Doubles
- (Australia) Mark Kratzmann / (Australia) Jason Stoltenberg
← 1989 ·	Singapore Open	· 1991 →

The 1990 Epson Singapore Super Tennis, also known as Singapore Open, was a men's tennis tournament played on outdoor hard courts at the National Stadium in Singapore and was part of the World Series of the 1990 ATP Tour. It was the second edition of the tournament and took place from 30 April through 6 May 1990. Unseeded Kelly Jones won his second consecutive singles title at the event.

== Finals ==
=== Singles ===
(United States) Kelly Jones defeated (Australia) Richard Fromberg 6–4, 2–6, 7–6

- It was Jones' only singles title of the year and the 2nd and last of his career.

=== Doubles ===
(Australia) Mark Kratzmann / (Australia) Jason Stoltenberg defeated (Australia) Brad Drewett / (Australia) Todd Woodbridge 6–1, 6–0

- It was Kratzmann's 4th doubles title of the year and the 12th of his career. It was Stoltenberg's first doubles title of his career.

== See also ==
- 1990 DHL Singapore Open - women's tournament
