= 1992 US Open (tennis) =

- Date: August 31 – September 13
- Edition: 112th
- Category: Grand Slam (ITF)
- Surface: Hardcourt
- Location: New York City, New York, United States

Champions

Men's singles
- (Sweden) Stefan Edberg

Women's singles
- (Federal Republic of Yugoslavia) Monica Seles

Men's doubles
- (United States) Jim Grabb / (United States) Richey Reneberg

Women's doubles
- (United States) Gigi Fernández / (Commonwealth of Independent States) Natasha Zvereva

Mixed doubles
- (Australia) Nicole Provis / (Australia) Mark Woodforde

Boys' singles
- (United States) Brian Dunn

Girls' singles
- (United States) Lindsay Davenport

Boys' doubles
- (United States) Jimmy Jackson / (United States) Eric Taino

Girls' doubles
- (United States) Lindsay Davenport / (United States) Nicole London
← 1991 ·	US Open	· 1993 →

The 1992 US Open was a tennis tournament played on outdoor hard courts at the USTA National Tennis Center in New York City in New York in the United States. It was the 112th edition of the US Open and was held from August 31 to September 13, 1992.

== Seniors ==
=== Men's singles ===
(Sweden) Stefan Edberg defeated (United States) Pete Sampras 3–6, 6–4, 7–6^{(7–5)}, 6–2

- It was Edberg's 6th career Grand Slam title and his 2nd and last US Open title.

=== Women's singles ===
(Federal Republic of Yugoslavia) Monica Seles defeated (Spain) Arantxa Sánchez Vicario 6–3, 6–3

- It was Seles' 7th career Grand Slam title and her 2nd and last US Open title.

=== Men's doubles ===
(United States) Jim Grabb / (United States) Richey Reneberg defeated (United States) Kelly Jones / (United States) Rick Leach 3–6, 7–6^{(7–2)}, 6–3, 6–3

- It was Grabb's 2nd and last career Grand Slam title and his only US Open title. It was Reneberg's 1st career Grand Slam title and his only US Open title.

=== Women's doubles ===
(United States) Gigi Fernández / (Commonwealth of Independent States) Natasha Zvereva defeated (Latvia) Larisa Neiland / (Czechoslovakia) Jana Novotná 7–6^{(7–4)}, 6–1

- It was Fernández's 6th career Grand Slam title and her 3rd US Open title. It was Zvereva's 7th career Grand Slam title and her 2nd US Open title.

=== Mixed doubles ===
(Australia) Nicole Provis / (Australia) Mark Woodforde defeated (Czechoslovakia) Helena Suková / (Netherlands) Tom Nijssen 4–6, 6–3, 6–3

- It was Provis' 2nd and last career Grand Slam title and her only US Open title. It was Woodforde's 5th career Grand Slam title and his 2nd US Open title.

== Juniors ==
=== Boys' singles ===
(United States) Brian Dunn defeated (Israel) Noam Behr 7–5, 6–2

=== Girls' singles ===
(United States) Lindsay Davenport (Note: Davenport reached the finals in 1998 and she won the title, and again in 2000, but lost to Venus Williams.) defeated (United States) Julie Steven 6–2, 6–2

=== Boys' doubles ===
(United States) Jimmy Jackson / (United States) Eric Taino defeated (Chile) Marcelo Ríos / (Chile) Gabriel Silberstein 6–3, 6–7, 6–4

=== Girls' doubles ===
(United States) Lindsay Davenport / (United States) Nicole London defeated (United States) Katie Schlukebir / (United States) Julie Steven 7–5, 6–7, 6–4

== Other events ==
=== Men's singles masters championships ===
(United States) Hank Pfister defeated (United States) Peter Fleming 6–3, 6–4

=== Men's doubles masters championships ===
(Australia) Paul McNamee / (Czechoslovakia) Tomáš Šmíd defeated (United States) Bob Lutz / (Romania) Ilie Năstase 6–2, 6–3

=== Women's doubles masters championships ===
(Australia) Wendy Turnbull / (United Kingdom) Virginia Wade defeated (United States) JoAnne Russell-Longdon / (United States) Sharon Walsh 6–3, 6–4

=== Mixed doubles masters championships ===
(United States) Marty Riessen / (Australia) Wendy Turnbull defeated (United States) Gene Mayer / (United Kingdom) Virginia Wade 6–3, 7–6

== Prize money ==
Event		W	F	SF	QF	4R	3R	2R	1R
Singles	Men	$500,000	$205,000	$125,000	$65,000	$35,000	$20,250	$12,400	$7,400
Singles	Women	$500,000	$205,000	$125,000	$65,000	$35,000	$20,250	$12,400	$7,400

Preceded by 1992 Wimbledon Championships	Grand Slams	Succeeded by 1993 Australian Open
