= 1993 US Open (tennis) =

- Date: August 30 – September 12
- Edition: 113th
- Category: Grand Slam (ITF)
- Surface: Hardcourt
- Location: Flushing Meadows, New York City, United States
- Venue: USTA National Tennis Center

Champions

Men's singles
- (United States) Pete Sampras

Women's singles
- (Germany) Steffi Graf

Men's doubles
- (United States) Ken Flach / (United States) Rick Leach

Women's doubles
- (Spain) Arantxa Sánchez Vicario / (Czech Republic) Helena Suková

Mixed doubles
- (Czech Republic) Helena Suková / (Australia) Todd Woodbridge

Boys' singles
- (Chile) Marcelo Ríos

Girls' singles
- (Italy) Maria-Francesca Bentivoglio

Boys' doubles
- (South Africa) Neville Godwin / (South Africa) Gareth Williams

Girls' doubles
- (United States) Nicole London / (United States) Julie Steven
← 1992 ·	US Open	· 1994 →

The 1993 US Open was a tennis tournament played on outdoor hard courts at the USTA National Tennis Center in New York City in New York in the United States. It was the 113th edition of the US Open and was held from August 30 to September 12, 1993.

== Seniors ==
=== Men's singles ===
(United States) Pete Sampras defeated (France) Cédric Pioline 6–4, 6–4, 6–3

- It was Sampras's 3rd career Grand Slam title and his 2nd US Open title.

=== Women's singles ===
(Germany) Steffi Graf defeated (Czech Republic) Helena Suková 6–3, 6–3

- It was Graf's 15th career Grand Slam title and her 3rd US Open title.

=== Men's doubles ===
(United States) Ken Flach / (United States) Rick Leach defeated (Czech Republic) Karel Nováček / (Czech Republic) Martin Damm 6–7^{(3–7)}, 6–4, 6–2

- It was Flach's 6th and last career Grand Slam title and his 2nd US Open title. It was Leach's 5th career Grand Slam title and his 1st US Open title.

=== Women's doubles ===
(Spain) Arantxa Sánchez Vicario / (Czech Republic) Helena Suková defeated (South Africa) Amanda Coetzer / (Argentina) Inés Gorrochategui 6–4, 6–2

- It was Sánchez Vicario's 6th career Grand Slam title and her 1st US Open title. It was Suková's 9th career Grand Slam title and her 2nd US Open title.

=== Mixed doubles ===
(Czech Republic) Helena Suková / (Australia) Todd Woodbridge defeated (United States) Martina Navratilova / (Australia) Mark Woodforde 6–3, 7–6^{(8–6)}

- It was Suková's 10th career Grand Slam title and her 3rd and last US Open title. It was Woodbridge's 5th career Grand Slam title and his 2nd US Open title.

== Juniors ==
=== Boys' singles ===
(Chile) Marcelo Ríos defeated (New Zealand) Steven Downs 7–6, 6–3

=== Girls' singles ===
(Italy) Maria Francesca Bentivoglio defeated (Japan) Yuka Yoshida 7–6, 6–4

=== Boys' doubles ===
(South Africa) Neville Godwin / (South Africa) Gareth Williams defeated (Australia) Ben Ellwood / (Australia) James Sekulov 6–3, 6–3

=== Girls' doubles ===
(United States) Nicole London / (United States) Julie Steven defeated (Japan) Hiroko Mochizuki / (Japan) Yuka Yoshida 6–3, 6–4

== Prize money ==
Event		W	F	SF	QF	4R	3R	2R	1R
Singles	Men	$535,000	$267,500	$133,750	$70,000	$37,000	$21,500	$13,300	$8,000
Singles	Women	$535,000	$267,500	$133,750	$70,000	$37,000	$21,500	$13,300	$8,000

Total prize money for the event was $9,022,000.

== In popular culture ==
In the Seinfeld episode "The Lip Reader" Jerry and George visit the 1993 US Open, where they can be seen sitting in the stands of an undisclosed outer court watching one of the three women's singles matches featuring a Croat. Kramer is also seen watching the Open on TV, where the reporter can be heard crediting a match win to Natalia Baudone, 3–6, 6–3, 7–5, over Mary Pierce. Pierce won the actual match 6–0, 6–7, 7–6. Kramer becomes a 'ballman' for the tournament later in the episode and accidentally injures Monica Seles in the final. Seles did not play in the tournament that year owing to an incident in April 1993 which prevented her from playing competitive tennis until August 1995.

Preceded by 1993 Wimbledon Championships	Grand Slams	Succeeded by 1994 Australian Open
