= 1998 Singapore Open – Doubles =

Doubles
- 1998 Singapore Open

Final
- Champions: (Australia) Todd Woodbridge (Australia) Mark Woodforde
- Runners-up: (India) Mahesh Bhupathi (India) Leander Paes
- Score: 6–2, 6–3

Details
- Draw: 16
- Seeds: 4

Events
Singles	Doubles
← 1997 ·	Singapore Open	· 1999 →

The 1998 Singapore Open was a men's tennis tournament played on Indoor Hard in Singapore, Singapore that was part of the Championship Series of the 1998 ATP Tour. It was the seventh edition of the tournament and was held from 12 October – 18 October.

== Seeds ==
Champion seeds are indicated in bold text while text in italics indicates the round in which those seeds were eliminated.

1. (Australia) **Todd Woodbridge** / (Australia) **Mark Woodforde (champions)**
2. (India) Mahesh Bhupathi / (India) Leander Paes (final)
3. (Canada) Sébastien Lareau / (Canada) Daniel Nestor (quarterfinals)
4. (United States) Patrick Galbraith / (New Zealand) Brett Steven (first round)

== Draw ==
=== Key ===
- Q = Qualifier
- WC = Wild card
- LL = Lucky loser
- Alt = Alternate
- ITF = ITF entry
- PR = Protected ranking
- SR = Special ranking
- SE = Special exempt
- JE = Junior exempt
- JR = Junior Accelerator Programme entrant
- CO = College Accelerator Programme entrant
- NG = Next Gen Accelerator Program entrant
- w/o = Walkover
- r = Retired
- d = Defaulted

=== Finals ===
First round
1	(Australia) **T Woodbridge** **(Australia) M Woodforde**	**6**	5	**6**
(United States) J Courier (United States) J-M Gambill	4	**7**	1
(South Africa) **L Bale** **(South Africa) B Haygarth**	**6**	4	**6**
(Croatia) S Hiršzon (Croatia) G Ivanišević	3	**6**	4
(United States) **J Gimelstob** **(United States) J Stark**	2	**6**	**6**
4	(United States) P Galbraith (New Zealand) B Steven	**6**	3	4
(Czech Republic) **M Damm** **(Australia) P Tramacchi**	**7**	**6**
(Thailand) P Srichaphan (Netherlands) R Wassen	5	4
(Romania) **A Pavel** **(Armenia) S Sargsian**	**6**	**6**
(Zimbabwe) W Black (South Africa) M Ondruska	0	3
3	(Canada) **S Lareau** **(Canada) D Nestor**	**6**	**6**
(Australia) M Tebbutt (Sweden) M Tillström	3	4
(Finland) **T Ketola** **(Italy) L Ketola**	3	**6**	**7**
(Germany) K Braasch (Germany) M Kohlmann	**6**	4	6
2	(India) **M Bhupathi** **(India) L Paes**	**7**	**6**
(United States) M Keil (United States) TJ Middleton	6	4

Quarterfinals
1	(Australia) **T Woodbridge** **(Australia) M Woodforde**	**6**	**7**
(South Africa) L Bale (South Africa) B Haygarth	2	6
(United States) **J Gimelstob** **(United States) J Stark**	**7**	**7**
(Czech Republic) M Damm (Australia) P Tramacchi	6	6
(Romania) **A Pavel** **(Armenia) S Sargsian**	**6**	1	**6**
3	(Canada) S Lareau (Canada) D Nestor	3	**6**	3
(Finland) T Ketola (Italy) L Ketola	3	3
2	(India) **M Bhupathi** **(India) L Paes**	**6**	**6**

Semifinals
1	(Australia) **T Woodbridge** **(Australia) M Woodforde**	2	**7**	**6**
(United States) J Gimelstob (United States) J Stark	**6**	6	4
(Romania) A Pavel (Armenia) S Sargsian	6	4
2	(India) **M Bhupathi** **(India) L Paes**	**7**	**6**

Final
1	(Australia) **T Woodbridge** **(Australia) M Woodforde**	**6**	**6**
2	(India) M Bhupathi (India) L Paes	2	3
