= 1988 WTA Singapore Open =

- Date: 18–24 April
- Edition: 3rd
- Category: Category 1
- Draw: 32S / 16D
- Prize money: $50,000
- Surface: Hard / outdoor
- Location: Singapore

Champions

Singles
- (United Kingdom) Monique Javer

Doubles
- (Soviet Union) Natalia Bykova / (Soviet Union) Natalia Medvedeva
← 1987 ·	WTA Singapore Open	· 1989 →

The 1988 Singapore Open was a women's tennis tournament played on outdoor hard courts in Singapore and was part of the Category 1 tier of the 1988 Virginia Slims World Championship Series. It was the third edition of the tournament and was held from 18 April through 24 April 1988. Unseeded Monique Javer won the singles title.

== Finals ==
=== Singles ===
(United Kingdom) Monique Javer defeated (Soviet Union) Leila Meskhi 7–6^{(7–3)}, 6–3

- It was Javer's only title of the year and the 1st of her career.

=== Doubles ===
(Soviet Union) Natalia Bykova / (Soviet Union) Natalia Medvedeva defeated (Soviet Union) Leila Meskhi / (Soviet Union) Svetlana Parkhomenko 7–6^{(7–4)}, 6–3

- It was Bykova's 2nd title of the year and the 2nd of her career. It was Medvedeva's only title of the year and the 1st of her career.
