= 1992 Epson Singapore Super Tennis =

1992 Singapore Open tennis tournament

- Date: 30 March – 5 April
- Edition: 4th
- Category: World Series
- Draw: 32S / 16D
- Prize money: $240,000
- Surface: Hard / outdoor
- Location: Singapore
- Venue: National Stadium

Champions

Singles
- (Australia) Simon Youl

Doubles
- (Australia) Todd Woodbridge / (Australia) Mark Woodforde
| ← 1991 · | Singapore Open | · 1996 → |

The 1992 Epson Singapore Super Tennis, also known as Singapore Open, was a men's tennis tournament played on outdoor hard courts at the National Stadium in Singapore and was part of the World Series of the 1992 ATP Tour. It was the fourth edition of the tournament and took place from 30 March through 5 April 1992. Unseeded Simon Youl won the singles title.

== Finals ==
=== Singles ===
(Australia) Simon Youl defeated (Netherlands) Paul Haarhuis 6–4, 6–1

- It was Youl's only singles title of the year and the 2nd and last of his career.

=== Doubles ===
(Australia) Todd Woodbridge / (Australia) Mark Woodforde defeated (Canada) Grant Connell / (Canada) Glenn Michibata 6–7, 6–2, 6–4

- It was Woodbridge's 4th doubles title of the year and the 12th of his career. It was Woodforde's 4th doubles title of the year and the 12th and last of his career.
