= 1998 Singapore Open – Singles =

Singles
- 1998 Singapore Open

Final
- Champion: (Chile) Marcelo Ríos
- Runner-up: (Australia) Mark Woodforde
- Score: 6–4, 6–2

Details
- Draw: 32
- Seeds: 8

Events
Singles	Doubles
← 1997 ·	Singapore Open	· 1999 →

The 1998 Singapore Open was a men's tennis tournament played on Indoor Hard in Singapore, Singapore that was part of the Championship Series of the 1998 ATP Tour. It was the seventh edition of the tournament and was held from 12 October – 18 October.

== Seeds ==
Champion seeds are indicated in bold text while text in italics indicates the round in which those seeds were eliminated.

1. (Chile) **Marcelo Ríos (champion)**
2. (Croatia) Goran Ivanišević (second round)
3. (United States) Michael Chang (first round)
4. (United States) Jan-Michael Gambill (quarterfinals)
5. (Australia) Andrew Ilie (first round)
6. (Sweden) Mikael Tillström (second round)
7. (Netherlands) Paul Haarhuis (first round)
8. (Paraguay) Ramón Delgado (first round)

== Draw ==
=== Key ===
- Q = Qualifier
- WC = Wild card
- LL = Lucky loser
- Alt = Alternate
- ITF = ITF entry
- PR = Protected ranking
- SR = Special ranking
- SE = Special exempt
- JE = Junior exempt
- JR = Junior Accelerator Programme entrant
- CO = College Accelerator Programme entrant
- NG = Next Gen Accelerator Program entrant
- w/o = Walkover
- r = Retired
- d = Defaulted

=== Finals ===
Semifinals
1	**(Chile) Marcelo Ríos**	**6**	**6**
(United States) Jim Courier	2	1
(Netherlands) Sjeng Schalken	**6**	4	2
**(Australia) Mark Woodforde**	0	**6**	**6**

Final
1	**(Chile) Marcelo Ríos**	**6**	**6**
(Australia) Mark Woodforde	4	2

=== Top half ===
First round
1	**(Chile) M Ríos**	**6**	**6**
(Canada) S Lareau	2	0
**(Romania) A Pavel**	**7**	**6**
(Netherlands) D van Scheppingen	6^{3}	4
**(Australia) L Hewitt**	**6**	**7**
(France) L Roux	2	6^{6}
**(United States) J Gimelstob**	**6**	**6**
8	(Paraguay) R Delgado	4	4
4	**(United States) J-M Gambill**	**6**	**6**
(United States) J Stark	1	2
**(New Zealand) B Steven**	**6**	**6**
(Germany) C Vinck	3	4
**(United States) J Courier**	**6**	**6**
(Canada) D Nestor	3	2
6	**(Sweden) M Tillström**	**6**	**6**
(India) M Bhupathi	1	3

Second round
1	**(Chile) M Ríos**	**6**	**6**
(Romania) A Pavel	2	4
**(Australia) L Hewitt**	6^{6}	**6**	**7**
(United States) J Gimelstob	**7**	2	6^{4}
4	**(United States) J-M Gambill**	w/o
(New Zealand) B Steven
**(United States) J Courier**	**6**	2	**7**
6	(Sweden) M Tillström	4	**6**	6^{3}

Quarterfinals
1	**(Chile) M Ríos**	5	**6**	**6**
(Australia) L Hewitt	**7**	3	4
4	(United States) J-M Gambill	4	4
**(United States) J Courier**	**6**	**6**

Semifinals
1	**(Chile) M Ríos**	**6**	**6**
(United States) J Courier	2	1

=== Bottom half ===
First round
**(Netherlands) S Schalken**	**6**	**6**
5	(Australia) A Ilie	4	2
**(Australia) T Woodbridge**	**7**	6^{5}	**6**
(Armenia) S Sargsian	6^{4}	**7**	4
**(Netherlands) J van Lottum**	**7**	**6**
(Zimbabwe) W Black	5	2
**(Germany) M Kohlmann**	2	**6**	**6**
3	(United States) M Chang	**6**	3	4
**(Denmark) K Carlsen**	0	**6**	**6**
7	(Netherlands) P Haarhuis	**6**	3	4
**(Czech Republic) M Damm**	**7**	**6**
(India) L Paes	5	1
**(Australia) M Woodforde**	**7**	**6**
(South Africa) M Ondruska	6^{4}	2
2	**(Croatia) G Ivanišević**	**6**	**6**
(United States) S Campbell	2	1

Second round
**(Netherlands) S Schalken**	**7**	**6**
(Australia) T Woodbridge	6^{3}	4
**(Netherlands) J van Lottum**	**6**	**6**
(Germany) M Kohlmann	4	2
**(Denmark) K Carlsen**	**6**	**6**
(Czech Republic) M Damm	1	1
**(Australia) M Woodforde**	**6**	**7**
2	(Croatia) G Ivanišević	4	6^{4}

Quarterfinals
**(Netherlands) S Schalken**	3	**6**	**6**
(Netherlands) J van Lottum	**6**	3	4
(Denmark) K Carlsen	**6**	2	3
**(Australia) M Woodforde**	4	**6**	**6**

Semifinals
(Netherlands) S Schalken	**6**	4	2
**(Australia) M Woodforde**	0	**6**	**6**
