= 1989 DHL Open – Singles =

Singles
- 1989 DHL Open
- 1988 Champion: (United Kingdom) Monique Javer

Final
- Champion: (New Zealand) Belinda Cordwell
- Runner-up: (Japan) Akiko Kijimuta
- Score: 6–1, 6–0

Details
- Draw: 32
- Seeds: 8

Events
Singles	Doubles
← 1988 ·	WTA Singapore Open	· 1990 →

Monique Javer was the defending champion but lost in the semifinals to Akiko Kijimuta.

Belinda Cordwell won in the final 6–1, 6–0 against Kijimuta.

== Seeds ==
A champion seed is indicated in bold text while text in italics indicates the round in which that seed was eliminated.

1. (Australia) Anne Minter (second round)
2. (New Zealand) **Belinda Cordwell (champion)**
3. (United States) Ann Henricksson (first round)
4. (Belgium) Sandra Wasserman (semifinals)
5. (United Kingdom) Monique Javer (semifinals)
6. (United States) Louise Allen (quarterfinals)
7. (United States) Marianne Werdel (first round)
8. (Poland) Iwona Kuczyńska (quarterfinals)

== Draw ==
=== Key ===
- Q = Qualifier
- WC = Wild card
- LL = Lucky loser
- Alt = Alternate
- SE = Special exempt
- PR = Protected ranking
- ITF = ITF entry
- JE = Junior exempt
- w/o = Walkover
- r = Retired
- d = Defaulted
- SR = Special ranking

First round
1	(Australia) **A Minter**	4	**6**	**6**
Q	(United States) A Grousbeck	**6**	4	4
(Japan) **A Kijimuta**	**6**	**7**
(United States) K Po	2	6
(United States) B Herr	**6**	1	6
(Japan) **M Yanagi**	2	**6**	**7**
Q	(Luxembourg) K Kschwendt	6	2
8	(Poland) **I Kuczyńska**	**7**	**6**
3	(United States) A Henricksson	**7**	6	4
(Switzerland) **E Krapl**	5	**7**	**6**
(Australia) **M Jaggard**	**6**	**6**
(West Germany) M Pawlik	2	2
(Japan) A Nishiya	2	4
(Australia) **L Field**	**6**	**6**
(United Kingdom) A Hobbs	4	0
5	(United Kingdom) **M Javer**	**6**	**6**
7	(United States) M Werdel	4	4
(Canada) **J Hetherington**	**6**	**6**
(Belgium) **A Devries**	4	**7**	**6**
(Japan) N Miyagi	**6**	5	2
Q	(Japan) **M Kidowaki**	**6**	**6**
(Sweden) J Jonerup	4	0
(Netherlands) H Witvoet	3	4
4	(Belgium) **S Wasserman**	**6**	**6**
6	(United States) **L Allen**	5	**7**	**6**
(Sweden) C Dahlman	**7**	6	0
(United States) **L-A Eldredge**	**6**	**6**
(Australia) E Smylie	1	3
(Netherlands) **C Bakkum**	**6**	5	**6**
(Australia) L O'Neill	3	**7**	2
Q	(Belgium) S Appelmans	2	5
2	(New Zealand) **B Cordwell**	**6**	**7**

Second round
1	(Australia) A Minter	1	4
(Japan) **A Kijimuta**	**6**	**6**
(Japan) M Yanagi	5	1
8	(Poland) **I Kuczyńska**	**7**	**6**
(Switzerland) **E Krapl**	**6**	**6**
(Australia) M Jaggard	2	1
(Australia) L Field	2	**7**	3
5	(United Kingdom) **M Javer**	**6**	5	**6**
(Canada) J Hetherington	**7**	5	0
(Belgium) **A Devries**	6	**7**	**6**
Q	(Japan) M Kidowaki	3	**7**	3
4	(Belgium) **S Wasserman**	**6**	6	**6**
6	(United States) **L Allen**	**6**	**6**
(United States) L-A Eldredge	0	3
(Netherlands) C Bakkum	2	3
2	(New Zealand) **B Cordwell**	**6**	**6**

Quarterfinals
(Japan) **A Kijimuta**	**6**	**6**
8	(Poland) I Kuczyńska	4	4
(Switzerland) E Krapl	4	3
5	(United Kingdom) **M Javer**	**6**	**6**
(Belgium) A Devries	4	4
4	(Belgium) **S Wasserman**	**6**	**6**
6	(United States) L Allen	2	1
2	(New Zealand) **B Cordwell**	**6**	**6**

Semifinals
(Japan) **A Kijimuta**	**6**	4	**6**
5	(United Kingdom) M Javer	3	**6**	0
4	(Belgium) S Wasserman	3	5
2	(New Zealand) **B Cordwell**	**6**	**7**

Final
(Japan) Akiko Kijimuta	1	0
2	(New Zealand) **Belinda Cordwell**	**6**	**6**
