= Kijimuta =

Kijimuta (written: 雉子牟田) is a Japanese surname. Notable people with the surname include:

- Akiko Kijimuta (雉子牟田 明子, born 1968), Japanese tennis player
- Naoko Kijimuta (雉子牟田 直子, born 1972), Japanese tennis player
