= 1989 Singapore Open – Doubles =

Doubles
- 1989 Singapore Open

Final
- Champions: (United States) Rick Leach (United States) Jim Pugh
- Runners-up: (United States) Paul Chamberlin (Kenya) Paul Wekesa
- Score: 6–3, 6–4

Events
Singles	Doubles
Singapore Open	· 1990 →

Rick Leach and Jim Pugh won in the final 6–3, 6–4 against Paul Chamberlin and Paul Wekesa.

== Seeds ==
Champion seeds are indicated in bold text while text in italics indicates the round in which those seeds were eliminated. The top two seeded teams received a bye into the quarterfinals.

1. (United States) **Rick Leach** / (United States) **Jim Pugh (champions)**
2. (Canada) Grant Connell / (Canada) Glenn Michibata (semifinals)
3. (Australia) Wally Masur / (Australia) Jason Stoltenberg (semifinals)
4. (United States) Kelly Jones / (United States) Joey Rive (first round)

== Draw ==
=== Key ===
- Q = Qualifier
- WC = Wild card
- LL = Lucky loser
- Alt = Alternate
- SE = Special exempt
- PR = Protected ranking
- ITF = ITF entry
- JE = Junior exempt
- w/o = Walkover
- r = Retired
- d = Defaulted
- SR = Special ranking

First round

Quarterfinals

Semifinals

Final

1
- (United States) **R Leach**
- (United States) **J Pugh**
**7**
3
**7**

- (Denmark) **M Christensen**
- (Italy) **G Pozzi**
**6**
**6**

- (Denmark) M Christensen
- (Italy) G Pozzi
6
**6**
6

(India) M Ferreira
(South Korea) Young Min-kwon
0
1

1
- (United States) **R Leach**
- (United States) **J Pugh**
2
**7**
**6**

3
- (Australia) **W Masur**
- (Australia) **J Stoltenberg**
**7**
6
**6**

3
- (Australia) W Masur
- (Australia) J Stoltenberg
**6**
6
4

- (Australia) R Fromberg
- (United States) L Scott
6
**7**
3

3
- (Australia) **W Masur**
- (Australia) **J Stoltenberg**
**6**
**6**

- (United States) M Anger
- (New Zealand) K Evernden
**6**
2
6

- (Sweden) T Nydahl
- (Finland) O Rahnasto
3
3

- (Sweden) **T Nydahl**
- (Finland) **O Rahnasto**
3
**6**
**7**

1
- (United States) **Rick Leach**
- (United States) **Jim Pugh**
**6**
**6**

(United States) Weller Evans
(United States) P Fishbach
4
2

- (United States) Paul Chamberlin
- (Kenya) Paul Wekesa
3
4

(Sweden) **J Carlsson**
(Sweden) **Chris Lindoff**
**6**
**6**

(Sweden) J Carlsson
(Sweden) C Lindoff

- (United States) **P Chamberlin**
- (Kenya) **P Wekesa**
3
**6**
**7**

- (United States) **P Chamberlin**
- (Kenya) **P Wekesa**
w/o

4
- (United States) K Jones
- (United States) J Rive
**6**
4
6

- (United States) **P Chamberlin**
- (Kenya) **P Wekesa**
6
**7**
**6**

(Singapore) Liu Sonny
(Singapore) Liu Wai-yaw
3
2

2
- (Canada) G Connell
- (Canada) G Michibata
**7**
6
2

(Canada) **Art Hobbs**
(United States) **Andrew Turcinovich**
**6**
**6**

(Canada) A Hobbs
(United States) A Turcinovich
4
2

2
- (Canada) **G Connell**
- (Canada) **G Michibata**
**6**
**6**
