= 1989 DHL Open – Doubles =

Doubles
- 1989 DHL Open
- 1988 Champions: (Soviet Union) Natalia Bykova (Soviet Union) Natalia Medvedeva

Final
- Champions: (New Zealand) Belinda Cordwell (Australia) Elizabeth Smylie
- Runners-up: (United States) Ann Henricksson (United States) Beth Herr
- Score: 6–7, 6–2, 6–1

Details
- Draw: 16
- Seeds: 4

Events
Singles	Doubles
← 1988 ·	WTA Singapore Open	· 1990 →

Natalia Bykova and Natalia Medvedeva were the defending champions but did not compete that year.

Belinda Cordwell and Elizabeth Smylie won in the final 6–7, 6–2, 6–1 against Ann Henricksson and Beth Herr.

== Seeds ==
Champion seeds are indicated in bold text while text in italics indicates the round in which those seeds were eliminated.

1. (New Zealand) **Belinda Cordwell** / (Australia) **Elizabeth Smylie (champions)**
2. (United States) Ann Henricksson / (United States) Beth Herr (final)
3. (United States) Louise Allen / (Poland) Iwona Kuczyńska (semifinals)
4. (Sweden) Maria Lindström / (United States) Heather Ludloff (semifinals)

== Draw ==
=== Key ===
- Q = Qualifier
- WC = Wild card
- LL = Lucky loser
- Alt = Alternate
- SE = Special exempt
- PR = Protected ranking
- ITF = ITF entry
- JE = Junior exempt
- w/o = Walkover
- r = Retired
- d = Defaulted
- SR = Special ranking

First round
1	(New Zealand) **B Cordwell** (Australia) **E Smylie**	**6**	**6**
(Japan) A Kijimuta (Japan) M Yanagi	3	2
(Australia) **L O'Neill** (United States) **M Werdel**	1	**7**	**6**
(United States) A Grousbeck (Luxembourg) K Kschwendt	**6**	5	1
4	(Sweden) **M Lindström** (United States) **H Ludloff**	**6**	**6**
(West Germany) C Singer (Belgium) S Wasserman	4	2
(United Kingdom) **A Hobbs** (Australia) **M Jaggard**	**6**	**6**
(Belgium) A Devries (Switzerland) E Krapl	1	2
(Japan) A Nishiya (Hong Kong) P Moreno	2	4
(South Africa) **R Field** (Australia) **A Minter**	**6**	**6**
(Netherlands) C Bakkum (Netherlands) H Witvoet	4	**7**	6
3	(United States) **L Allen** (Poland) **I Kuczyńska**	**6**	6	**7**
(Japan) **R Hiraki** (Japan) **N Miyagi**	**6**	**6**
(Japan) E Okagawa (Japan) K Okamoto	4	3
(West Germany) M Pawlik (Switzerland) M Strebel	1	3
2	(United States) **A Henricksson** (United States) **B Herr**	**6**	**6**

Quarterfinals
1	(New Zealand) **B Cordwell** (Australia) **E Smylie**	**6**	4	**6**
(Australia) L O'Neill (United States) M Werdel	4	**6**	4
4	(Sweden) **M Lindström** (United States) **H Ludloff**	6	**7**	**6**
(United Kingdom) A Hobbs (Australia) M Jaggard	**7**	6	3
(South Africa) R Field (Australia) A Minter	1	**6**	4
3	(United States) **L Allen** (Poland) **I Kuczyńska**	**6**	2	**6**
(Japan) R Hiraki (Japan) N Miyagi	5	1
2	(United States) **A Henricksson** (United States) **B Herr**	**7**	**6**

Semifinals
1	(New Zealand) **B Cordwell** (Australia) **E Smylie**	**7**	**6**
4	(Sweden) M Lindström (United States) H Ludloff	6	2
3	(United States) L Allen (Poland) I Kuczyńska	5	**7**	4
2	(United States) **A Henricksson** (United States) **B Herr**	**7**	6	**6**

Final
1	(New Zealand) **Belinda Cordwell** (Australia) **Elizabeth Smylie**	6	**6**	**6**
2	(United States) Ann Henricksson (United States) Beth Herr	**7**	2	1
