= 1988 WTA Singapore Open – Singles =

Singles
- 1988 WTA Singapore Open

Final
- Champion: (United Kingdom) Monique Javer
- Runner-up: (Soviet Union) Leila Meskhi
- Score: 7–6, 6–3

Details
- Draw: 32
- Seeds: 8

Events
Singles	Doubles
← 1987 ·	Singapore Open	· 1989 →

Anne Minter was the defending champion but lost in the quarter-finals to Natalia Bykova.

Monique Javer won in the final 7–6, 6–3 against Leila Meskhi.

== Seeds ==
A champion seed is indicated in bold text while text in italics indicates the round in which that seed was eliminated.

1. (Soviet Union) Natasha Zvereva (first round)
2. (Australia) Anne Minter (quarterfinals)
3. (Australia) Dianne Balestrat (semifinals)
4. (Soviet Union) Leila Meskhi (final)
5. (United States) Gigi Fernández (second round)
6. (United States) Robin White (second round)
7. (United States) Barbara Gerken (second round)
8. (Soviet Union) Svetlana Parkhomenko (first round)

== Draw ==
=== Key ===
- Q = Qualifier
- WC = Wild card
- LL = Lucky loser
- Alt = Alternate
- ITF = ITF entry
- PR = Protected ranking
- SR = Special ranking
- SE = Special exempt
- JE = Junior exempt
- JR = Junior Accelerator Programme entrant
- CO = College Accelerator Programme entrant
- NG = Next Gen Accelerator Program entrant
- w/o = Walkover
- r = Retired
- d = Defaulted

First round
1	(Soviet Union) N Zvereva	2	2
(Australia) **J Byrne**	**6**	**6**
(United States) L Antonoplis	2	1
(United Kingdom) **M Javer**	**6**	**6**
(Norway) A Jonsson	1	0
(Netherlands) **C Bakkum**	**6**	**6**
(United Kingdom) V Lake	0	**7**	3
5	(United States) **G Fernández**	**6**	6	**6**
3	(Australia) **D Balestrat**	3	**6**	**6**
(New Zealand) R Seeman	**6**	1	2
(United Kingdom) **C Wood**	**6**	**6**
(West Germany) K Düll	4	4
(Australia) **M Jaggard**	**6**	**6**
(United Kingdom) J Salmon	1	4
(Belgium) **A Devries**	**6**	**6**
8	(Soviet Union) S Parkhomenko	2	1
7	(United States) **B Gerken**	**6**	**6**
(Japan) K Okamoto	4	0
(Japan) **M Yanagi**	**6**	**6**
(United States) M Van Nostrand	0	1
(Japan) E Okagawa	0	4
(Japan) **A Nishiya**	**6**	**6**
(Hong Kong) P Moreno	2	2
4	(Soviet Union) **L Meskhi**	**6**	**6**
6	(United States) **R White**	2	**6**	**6**
(United Kingdom) T Catlin	**6**	3	2
(Soviet Union) **N Bykova**	**6**	**6**
(Soviet Union) N Medvedeva	4	2
(Netherlands) S Schilder	**6**	2	1
(United Kingdom) **S Loosemore**	4	**6**	**6**
(United States) S Mascarin	4	3
2	(Australia) **A Minter**	**6**	**6**

Second round
(Australia) J Byrne	3	1
(United Kingdom) **M Javer**	**6**	**6**
(Netherlands) **C Bakkum**	4	**6**	**6**
5	(United States) G Fernández	**6**	4	3
3	(Australia) **D Balestrat**	1	**6**	**6**
(United Kingdom) C Wood	**6**	3	4
(Australia) **M Jaggard**	**7**	**6**
(Belgium) A Devries	5	3
7	(United States) B Gerken	**7**	6	2
(Japan) **M Yanagi**	5	**7**	**6**
(Japan) A Nishiya	2	5
4	(Soviet Union) **L Meskhi**	**6**	**7**
6	(United States) R White	4	6
(Soviet Union) **N Bykova**	**6**	**7**
(United Kingdom) S Loosemore	0	**7**	4
2	(Australia) **A Minter**	**6**	5	**6**

Quarterfinals
(United Kingdom) **M Javer**	**6**	**6**
(Netherlands) C Bakkum	3	3
3	(Australia) **D Balestrat**	**6**	**6**
(Australia) M Jaggard	3	4
(Japan) M Yanagi	4	1
4	(Soviet Union) **L Meskhi**	**6**	**6**
(Soviet Union) **N Bykova**	**6**	2	**7**
2	(Australia) A Minter	3	**6**	5

Semifinals
(United Kingdom) **M Javer**	**6**	**6**
3	(Australia) D Balestrat	0	1
4	(Soviet Union) **L Meskhi**	4	**6**	**6**
(Soviet Union) N Bykova	**6**	4	3

Final
(United Kingdom) **Monique Javer**	**7**	**6**
4	(Soviet Union) Leila Meskhi	6	3
