= 1991 Epson Singapore Super Tennis =

1991 Singapore Open tennis tournament

- Date: 22–28 April
- Edition: 3rd
- Category: World Series
- Draw: 32S / 16D
- Prize money: $215,000
- Surface: Hard / outdoor
- Location: Singapore
- Venue: National Stadium

Champions

Singles
- (Netherlands) Jan Siemerink

Doubles
- (Canada) Grant Connell / (Canada) Glenn Michibata
← 1990 ·	Singapore Open	· 1992 →

The 1991 Epson Singapore Super Tennis, also known as Singapore Open, was a men's tennis tournament played on outdoor hard courts at the National Stadium in Singapore and was part of the World Series of the 1991 ATP Tour. It was the third edition of the tournament and took place from 22 April through 28 April 1991. Second-seeded Jan Siemerink won the singles title.

== Finals ==
=== Singles ===
(Netherlands) Jan Siemerink defeated (Israel) Gilad Bloom 6–4, 6–3

- It was Siemerink's first singles title of his career.

=== Doubles ===
(Canada) Grant Connell / (Canada) Glenn Michibata defeated (South Africa) Stefan Kruger / (South Africa) Christo van Rensburg 6–4, 5–7, 7–6

- It was Connell's only doubles title of the year and the 4th of his career. It was Michibata's only doubles title of the year and the 4th and last of his career.
