= 1988 WTA Singapore Open – Doubles =

Doubles
- 1988 WTA Singapore Open
- 1987 Champions: (United States) Anna-Maria Fernandez (New Zealand) Julie Richardson

Final
- Champions: (Soviet Union) Natalia Bykova (Soviet Union) Natalia Medvedeva
- Runners-up: (Soviet Union) Leila Meskhi (Soviet Union) Svetlana Parkhomenko
- Score: 7–6, 6–3

Details
- Draw: 16
- Seeds: 4

Events
Singles	Doubles
← 1987 ·	Singapore Open	· 1989 →

Anna-Maria Fernandez and Julie Richardson were the defending champions but did not compete that year.

Natalia Bykova and Natalia Medvedeva won in the final 7–6, 6–3 against Leila Meskhi and Svetlana Parkhomenko.

== Seeds ==
Champion seeds are indicated in bold text while text in italics indicates the round in which those seeds were eliminated. The top three seeded teams received a bye into the quarterfinals.

1. (Soviet Union) Leila Meskhi / (Soviet Union) Natalia Medvedeva (final)
2. (Soviet Union) Larisa Savchenko / (Soviet Union) Natasha Zvereva (quarterfinals)
3. (Australia) Jenny Byrne / (Australia) Michelle Jaggard (quarterfinals)
4. (United States) Lea Antonoplis / (United States) Barbara Gerken (first round)

== Draw ==
=== Key ===
- Q = Qualifier
- WC = Wild card
- LL = Lucky loser
- Alt = Alternate
- ITF = ITF entry
- PR = Protected ranking
- SR = Special ranking
- SE = Special exempt
- JE = Junior exempt
- JR = Junior Accelerator Programme entrant
- CO = College Accelerator Programme entrant
- NG = Next Gen Accelerator Program entrant
- w/o = Walkover
- r = Retired
- d = Defaulted

First round

Quarterfinals

Semifinals

Final

1
- (Soviet Union) **L Meskhi**
- (Soviet Union) **S Parkhomenko**
**6**
**7**

- (United States) **S Mascarin**
- (United Kingdom) **C Wood**
**6**
**6**

- (United States) S Mascarin
- (United Kingdom) C Wood
1
5

- (Australia) D Balestrat
- (Belgium) A Devries
0
1

1
- (Soviet Union) **L Meskhi**
- (Soviet Union) **S Parkhomenko**
**6**
**6**

- (Australia) A Minter
- (United States) M Van Nostrand
2
4

3
- (Australia) J Byrne
- (Australia) M Jaggard
**6**
5
3

- (Australia) **A Minter**
- (United States) **M Van Nostrand**
**6**
**6**

- (Australia) **A Minter**
- (United States) **M Van Nostrand**
2
**7**
**6**

- (Hong Kong) P Moreno
- (Japan) A Nishiya
3
2

1
- (Soviet Union) Leila Meskhi
- (Soviet Union) Svetlana Parkhomenko
6
3

- (West Germany) K Düll
- (New Zealand) R Seeman
3
0

- (Soviet Union) **Natalia Bykova**
- (Soviet Union) **Natalia Medvedeva**
**7**
**6**

- (Soviet Union) **N Bykova**
- (Soviet Union) **N Medvedeva**
**6**
**6**

- (Soviet Union) **N Bykova**
- (Soviet Union) **N Medvedeva**
**6**
**6**

- (Netherlands) **C Bakkum**
- (Netherlands) **S Schilder**
**6**
**6**

- (Netherlands) C Bakkum
- (Netherlands) S Schilder
2
1

4
- (United States) L Antonoplis
- (United States) B Gerken
3
2

- (Soviet Union) **N Bykova**
- (Soviet Union) **N Medvedeva**
2
**6**
**7**

- (Japan) **E Okagawa**
- (Japan) **K Okamoto**
5
**6**
**6**

- (Japan) E Okagawa
- (Japan) K Okamoto
**6**
2
5

- (United Kingdom) M Javer
- (United Kingdom) S Loosemore
**7**
4
3

- (Japan) **E Okagawa**
- (Japan) **K Okamoto**
**w/o**

2
- (Soviet Union) L Savchenko
- (Soviet Union) N Zvereva
