= 1994 Singapore Classic – Doubles =

Doubles
- 1994 Singapore Classic

Final
- Champions: (United States) Patty Fendick (United States) Meredith McGrath
- Runners-up: (United States) Nicole Arendt (Australia) Kristine Radford
- Score: 6–4, 6–1

Details
- Draw: 16
- Seeds: 4

Events
Singles	Doubles
← 1990 ·	WTA Singapore Open

Jo Durie and Jill Hetherington were the defending champions in 1990, but none competed this year.

Patty Fendick and Meredith McGrath won the title by defeating Nicole Arendt and Kristine Radford 6–4, 6–1 in the final.

== Seeds ==
1. (United States) Patty Fendick / (United States) Meredith McGrath (champions)
2. (Australia) Jenny Byrne / (Australia) Rachel McQuillan (quarterfinals)
3. (United States) Nicole Arendt / (Australia) Kristine Radford (final)
4. (United States) Linda Wild / (Czech Republic) Andrea Strnadová (first round)

== Draw ==
=== Key ===
- Q = Qualifier
- WC = Wild card
- LL = Lucky loser
- Alt = Alternate
- SE = Special exempt
- PR = Protected ranking
- ITF = ITF entry
- JE = Junior exempt
- w/o = Walkover
- r = Retired
- d = Defaulted
- SR = Special ranking

First round
1	(United States) P Fendick (United States) M McGrath	6	6
(United States) E deLone (Australia) T Morton-Rodgers	0	2
(Russia) N Egorova (Russia) S Parkhomenko	1	6	5
(Japan) Y Kamio (United States) A Leand	6	2	7
4	(United States) L Wild (Czech Republic) A Strnadová	1	6	0
(Australia) D Jones (Japan) A Sugiyama	6	3	6
Q	(United States) M Ceniza (South Africa) M Joubert	6	1
(France) A Dechaume-Balleret (Argentina) F Labat	7	6
(Belgium) N Feber (Japan) R Hiraki	3	6	7
(Canada) M Bernard (Canada) C Delisle	6	1	5
(China) F Li (China) L Li	5	4
3	(United States) N Arendt (Australia) K Radford	7	6
(Australia) M Jaggard-Lai (United States) M Werdel	6	4	7
(South Africa) T Price (United States) S Reece	4	6	5
WC	(Chinese Taipei) T-t Weng (Singapore) Lela Zainal	2	0
2	(Australia) J Byrne (Australia) R McQuillan	6	6

Quarterfinals
1	(United States) P Fendick (United States) M McGrath	6	4	6
(Japan) Y Kamio (United States) A Leand	2	6	2
(Australia) D Jones (Japan) A Sugiyama	4	4
(France) A Dechaume-Balleret (Argentina) F Labat	6	6
(Belgium) N Feber (Japan) R Hiraki	5	3
3	(United States) N Arendt (Australia) K Radford	7	6
(Australia) M Jaggard-Lai (United States) M Werdel	7	6
2	(Australia) J Byrne (Australia) R McQuillan	5	3

Semifinals
1	(United States) P Fendick (United States) M McGrath	6	6
(France) A Dechaume-Balleret (Argentina) F Labat	3	3
3	(United States) N Arendt (Australia) K Radford	6	6
(Australia) M Jaggard-Lai (United States) M Werdel	3	4

Final
1	(United States) P Fendick (United States) M McGrath	6	6
3	(United States) N Arendt (Australia) K Radford	4	1
