= 2025 Singapore Tennis Open – Doubles =

Doubles
- 2025 Singapore Tennis Open

Final
- Champions: (United States) Desirae Krawczyk (Mexico) Giuliana Olmos
- Runners-up: (China) Wang Xinyu (China) Zheng Saisai
- Score: 7–5, 6–0

Details
- Draw: 32
- Seeds: 4

Events
Singles	Doubles
- WTA Singapore Open

This was the first edition of the tournament. Desirae Krawczyk and Giuliana Olmos won the title, defeating Wang Xinyu and Zheng Saisai 7–5, 6–0 in the final.

== Seeds ==
1. (United States) Caroline Dolehide / (United States) Taylor Townsend (first round)
2. (United States) Desirae Krawczyk / (Mexico) Giuliana Olmos (champions)
3. (China) Wang Xinyu / (China) Zheng Saisai (final)
4. (United Kingdom) Harriet Dart / (United Kingdom) Maia Lumsden (semifinals, withdrew)

== Draw ==
Key

- Q = Qualifier
- WC = Wild card
- LL = Lucky loser
- Alt = Alternate
- ITF = ITF entry
- PR = Protected ranking
- SR = Special ranking
- SE = Special exempt
- JE = Junior exempt
- JR = Junior Accelerator Programme entrant
- CO = College Accelerator Programme entrant
- NG = Next Gen Accelerator Program entrant
- w/o = Walkover
- r = Retired
- d = Defaulted

=== Draw ===
First round
1	(United States) C Dolehide (United States) T Townsend	4	4
(Japan) M Uchijima (China) Y Xu	6	6
(United States) J Aney (Thailand) P Plipuech	6	4	[4]
(Japan) N Hibino (Georgia (country)) O Kalashnikova	3	6	[10]
3	(China) Xin Wang (China) S Zheng	2	6	[10]
(Japan) M Ninomiya (Chinese Taipei) C-y Tsao	6	2	[4]
(United States) H Baptiste (United Kingdom) H Watson	6	6
P Kudermetova (Canada) R Marino	3	4
(Spain) C Bucșa (Colombia) C Osorio	6	6
(Netherlands) A Hartono (India) P Thombare	1	3
A Anshba (Mexico) R Zarazúa	6	4	[9]
4	(United Kingdom) H Dart (United Kingdom) M Lumsden	4	6	[11]
(China) X Jiang (China) L Zhu	6	7^{7}
(Slovakia) AK Schmiedlová (Switzerland) J Teichmann	2	6^{4}
(United Kingdom) M Brooks (Netherlands) I Haverlag	3	6^{3}
2	(United States) D Krawczyk (Mexico) G Olmos	6	7^{7}

Quarterfinals
(Japan) M Uchijima (China) Y Xu	4	6	[5]
(Japan) N Hibino (Georgia (country)) O Kalashnikova	6	3	[10]
3	(China) Xin Wang (China) S Zheng	6	3	[10]
(United States) H Baptiste (United Kingdom) H Watson	2	6	[6]
(Spain) C Bucșa (Colombia) C Osorio	0	2
4	(United Kingdom) H Dart (United Kingdom) M Lumsden	6	6
(China) X Jiang (China) L Zhu	7^{7}	5	[3]
2	(United States) D Krawczyk (Mexico) G Olmos	6^{5}	7	[10]

Semifinals
(Japan) N Hibino (Georgia (country)) O Kalashnikova	3	2
3	(China) Xin Wang (China) S Zheng	6	6
4	(United Kingdom) H Dart (United Kingdom) M Lumsden
2	(United States) D Krawczyk (Mexico) G Olmos	w/o

Final
3	(China) Xin Wang (China) S Zheng	5	0
2	(United States) D Krawczyk (Mexico) G Olmos	7	6
