= Nicole London =

American tennis player

- Country (sports): United States
- Born: February 3, 1976 (age 50)
- Coach: JoAnne RussellRobert Lansdorp
- Prize money: US$ 26,350

Singles
- Career record: 14–15
- Career titles: 0 WTA, 0 ITF
- Highest ranking: No. 238 (26 July 1993)

Grand Slam singles results
- US Open: 2R (1992)

Doubles
- Career record: 5–5
- Career titles: 0 WTA, 1 ITF
- Highest ranking: No. 485 (13 September 1993)

Grand Slam doubles results
- US Open: 1R (1991)
- Australian Open Junior: W (1992)
- US Open Junior: W (1992, 1993)

Nicole London (born February 3, 1976) is a former tennis player from the United States. She was a three-time Grand-Slam Girls' Doubles Champion. Her career on the tennis circuit was from 1990 to 1994.

== Career ==
London led the girls' team at Palos Verdes Peninsula High School.

At age 14 in 1991, London and her partner, Chanda Rubin, won the Women's Doubles title at the $10,000 ITF tournament in Mission Hills, California.

In 1992, with her partner Lindsay Davenport, she won the Australian Open Junior Girls' Doubles title and the 1992 US Open Junior Girls' Doubles title.

In September 1993, London and her partner Julie Steven won the US Open Junior Girls' Doubles title.

== ITF Circuit finals ==
$100,000 tournaments
$75,000 tournaments
$50,000 tournaments
$25,000 tournaments
$10,000 tournaments

=== Doubles finals ===
Result	Date	Tournament	Surface	Partner	Opponents	Score
Win	14 January 1991	Mission, United States	Hard	(United States) Chanda Rubin	(United States) Jessica Emmons (United States) Betsy Somerville	6–3, 2–6, 6–4

== Sources ==
- John Barrett, ed. (1993). World of Tennis. London: Queen Anne Press. ISBN 978-0-00-218508-0.
- Eliot Berry (2014). Topspin. Henry Holt and Company. ISBN 978-1-4668-8282-9.
