= 1992 US Open – Women's singles =

Women's singles
- 1992 US Open

Final
- Champion: (Federal Republic of Yugoslavia) Monica Seles
- Runner-up: (Spain) Arantxa Sánchez Vicario
- Score: 6–3, 6–3

Details
- Draw: 128
- Seeds: 16

Events
Singles	men	women		boys	girls
Doubles	men	women	mixed	boys	girls
WC Singles	men	women	quad
WC Doubles	men	women	quad
Legends	men	women	mixed
← 1991 ·	US Open	· 1993 →

Defending champion Monica Seles defeated Arantxa Sánchez Vicario in the final, 6–3, 6–3 to win the women's singles tennis title at the 1992 US Open. It was her second US Open title and seventh major title overall. Seles did not lose a set during the tournament. By reaching the final, Seles became the sixth woman (after Maureen Connolly, Margaret Court, Chris Evert, Martina Navratilova, and Steffi Graf) to reach all four major finals in a calendar year. This the first time that both finalists at the tournament were from Europe.

== Seeds ==
1. (Federal Republic of Yugoslavia) Monica Seles (champion)
2. (Germany) Steffi Graf (quarterfinals)
3. (United States) Martina Navratilova (second round)
4. (Argentina) Gabriela Sabatini (quarterfinals)
5. (Spain) Arantxa Sánchez Vicario (final)
6. (United States) Jennifer Capriati (third round)
7. (United States) Mary Joe Fernández (semifinals)
8. (Spain) Conchita Martínez (first round)
9. (Switzerland) Manuela Maleeva-Fragnière (semifinals)
10. (Czechoslovakia) Jana Novotná (first round)
11. (Germany) Anke Huber (first round)
12. (France) Nathalie Tauziat (second round)
13. (Czechoslovakia) Helena Suková (fourth round)
14. (United States) Zina Garrison (fourth round)
15. (Bulgaria) Katerina Maleeva (third round)
16. (France) Mary Pierce (fourth round)

== Draw ==
=== Key ===
- Q = Qualifier
- WC = Wild card
- LL = Lucky loser
- Alt = Alternate
- ITF = ITF entry
- PR = Protected ranking
- SR = Special ranking
- SE = Special exempt
- JE = Junior exempt
- JR = Junior Accelerator Programme entrant
- CO = College Accelerator Programme entrant
- NG = Next Gen Accelerator Program entrant
- w/o = Walkover
- r = Retired
- d = Defaulted

=== Finals ===
Quarterfinals
1	(Federal Republic of Yugoslavia) Monica Seles	6	6
(Canada) Patricia Hy	1	2
4	(Argentina) Gabriela Sabatini	2	6	4
7	(United States) Mary Joe Fernández	6	1	6
9	(Switzerland) Manuela Maleeva-Fragnière	6	5
(Bulgaria) Magdalena Maleeva	2	3^{r}
5	(Spain) Arantxa Sánchez Vicario	7^{7}	6
2	(Germany) Steffi Graf	6^{5}	3

Semifinals
1	(Federal Republic of Yugoslavia) Monica Seles	6	6
7	(United States) Mary Joe Fernández	3	2
9	(Switzerland) Manuela Maleeva-Fragnière	2	1
5	(Spain) Arantxa Sánchez Vicario	6	6

Final
1	(Federal Republic of Yugoslavia) Monica Seles	6	6
5	(Spain) Arantxa Sánchez Vicario	3	3

=== Top half ===
==== Section 1 ====
First round
1	(Federal Republic of Yugoslavia) M Seles	6	6
(United States) A Keller	1	0
(Austria) P Ritter	3	4
WC	(United States) L Raymond	6	6
(Germany) C Porwik	6	6
Q	(United States) C Benjamin	3	4
(Spain) V Ruano Pascual	5	2
(Peru) L Gildemeister	7	6
(Italy) N Baudone	6	4	7
Q	(Austria) B Reinstadler	4	6	5
(Switzerland) C Fauche	0	2
(United States) G Fernández	6	6
(Germany) S Hack	6	6
WC	(United States) S McCarthy	4	3
(South Africa) R Fairbank-Nideffer	6	7^{7}
10	(Czechoslovakia) J Novotná	3	6^{3}

Second round
1	(Federal Republic of Yugoslavia) M Seles	7	6
WC	(United States) L Raymond	5	0
(Germany) C Porwik	7	7
(Peru) L Gildemeister	5	5
(Italy) N Baudone	3	6	2
(United States) G Fernández	6	3	6
(Germany) S Hack	7	6
(South Africa) R Fairbank-Nideffer	5	4

Third round
1	(Federal Republic of Yugoslavia) M Seles	6	6
(Germany) C Porwik	4	0
(United States) G Fernández	6	6
(Germany) S Hack	4	1

Fourth round
1	(Federal Republic of Yugoslavia) M Seles	6	6
(United States) G Fernández	1	2

==== Section 2 ====
First round
13	(Czechoslovakia) H Suková	6	6
(Sweden) C Lindqvist	0	4
(Japan) K Date	6	6
(Germany) M Babel	1	0
(United States) L McNeil	6^{5}	7^{8}	6
(Netherlands) S Rottier	7^{7}	6^{6}	2
(France) I Demongeot	3	4
(Switzerland) E Zardo	6	6
(Canada) P Hy	6	6
(Czechoslovakia) E Švíglerová	1	1
(Austria) J Wiesner	6	7^{7}
(Hungary) A Temesvári-Trunkos	3	6^{4}
(France) S Testud	6	7^{7}
Q	(France) A Fusai	4	6^{4}
(Netherlands) N Krijger-Jagerman	6^{3}	2
6	(United States) J Capriati	7^{7}	6

Second round
13	(Czechoslovakia) H Suková	6	7
(Japan) K Date	2	5
(United States) L McNeil	6	7
(Switzerland) E Zardo	1	5
(Canada) P Hy	6	6
(Austria) J Wiesner	2	2
(France) S Testud	2	3
6	(United States) J Capriati	6	6

Third round
13	(Czechoslovakia) H Suková	6	6
(United States) L McNeil	2	3
(Canada) P Hy	7	6
6	(United States) J Capriati	5	4

Fourth round
13	(Czechoslovakia) H Suková	1	6^{2}
(Canada) P Hy	6	7^{7}

==== Section 3 ====
First round
4	(Argentina) G Sabatini	6	6
(United States) L Harvey-Wild	1	2
(France) J Halard	6	6
(Italy) F Bonsignori	1	3
(China) F Li	7	6
(Czechoslovakia) K Habšudová	5	0
(United States) D Graham	3	2
(Commonwealth of Independent States) N Zvereva	6	6
Q	(Commonwealth of Independent States) V Milvidskaia	6	6
(United States) T Whitlinger	4	1
(Commonwealth of Independent States) E Maniokova	3	1
WC	(United States) C Kuhlman	6	6
(United Kingdom) J Durie	1	6	3
Q	(United Kingdom) C Wood	6	0	6
(Belgium) S Appelmans	6	6
11	(Germany) A Huber	3	4

Second round
4	(Argentina) G Sabatini	6	6
(France) J Halard	0	4
(China) F Li	1	2
(Commonwealth of Independent States) N Zvereva	6	6
Q	(Commonwealth of Independent States) V Milvidskaia	5	7^{7}	2
WC	(United States) C Kuhlman	7	6^{4}	6
Q	(United Kingdom) C Wood	3	2
(Belgium) S Appelmans	6	6

Third round
4	(Argentina) G Sabatini	6	5	6
(Commonwealth of Independent States) N Zvereva	4	7	4
WC	(United States) C Kuhlman	2	1
(Belgium) S Appelmans	6	6

Fourth round
4	(Argentina) G Sabatini	6	6
(Belgium) S Appelmans	1	3

==== Section 4 ====
First round
16	(France) M Pierce	6	6
WC	(Venezuela) M-A Vento	2	2
(Italy) L Ferrando	5	6	6
(Finland) P Thorén	7	1	0
(United Kingdom) M Javer	4	4
(United States) S Rehe	6	6
(Germany) S Frankl	0	3
(United States) R White	6	6
(Netherlands) B Schultz	6	4	6
(United States) M Werdel	3	6	4
(France) P Paradis-Mangon	6	7
(Poland) K Nowak	1	5
(Commonwealth of Independent States) N Medvedeva	6	6
(United States) A Frazier	4	1
(United States) D Faber	6	0	4
7	(United States) MJ Fernandez	3	6	6

Second round
16	(France) M Pierce	7	6
(Italy) L Ferrando	5	4
(United States) S Rehe	5	7	0
(United States) R White	7	5	6
(Netherlands) B Schultz	6	6
(France) P Paradis-Mangon	2	0
(Commonwealth of Independent States) N Medvedeva	6	3	1
7	(United States) MJ Fernandez	3	6	6

Third round
16	(France) M Pierce	6	6
(United States) R White	2	1
(Netherlands) B Schultz	4	2
7	(United States) MJ Fernandez	6	6

Fourth round
16	(France) M Pierce	0	4
7	(United States) MJ Fernandez	6	6

=== Bottom half ===
==== Section 5 ====
First round
8	(Spain) C Martínez	3	6	4
(United States) A Grossman	6	2	6
(France) N van Lottum	6	7
(Austria) B Paulus	3	5
(Australia) K Godridge	2	3
(United States) K Rinaldi	6	6
WC	(United States) M-L Daniels	4	6	5
(United States) C Cunningham	6	2	7
(Czechoslovakia) A Strnadová	6	6
(Germany) B Rittner	2	1
(Czechoslovakia) R Zrubáková	5	6^{1}
(United States) G Helgeson	7	7^{7}
(United Kingdom) S Gomer	4	6^{3}
(United States) L Allen	6	7^{7}
(South Africa) E Reinach	5	5
9	(Switzerland) Man Maleeva-Fragnière	7	7

Second round
(United States) A Grossman	6^{7}	4
(France) N van Lottum	7^{9}	6
(United States) K Rinaldi	6^{2}	2
(United States) C Cunningham	7^{7}	6
(Czechoslovakia) A Strnadová	6	7^{7}
(United States) G Helgeson	3	6^{5}
(United States) L Allen	4	2
9	(Switzerland) Man Maleeva-Fragnière	6	6

Third round
(France) N van Lottum	6	4	0
(United States) C Cunningham	2	6	6
(Czechoslovakia) A Strnadová	7^{8}	3	2
9	(Switzerland) Man Maleeva-Fragnière	6^{6}	6	6

Fourth round
(United States) C Cunningham	3	5
9	(Switzerland) Man Maleeva-Fragnière	6	7

==== Section 6 ====
First round
15	(Bulgaria) K Maleeva	7	6
(Australia) J Byrne	5	2
(United States) T Whittington	2	6	3
(Belgium) D Monami	6	2	6
WC	(United States) J Emmons	1	5
(United States) C Rubin	6	7
(Australia) N Provis	6	6
LL	(Japan) K Nagatsuka	4	2
Q	(United States) N Arendt	7^{7}	6
(Chinese Taipei) S-t Wang	6^{4}	3
(United States) K Po	6	6
WC	(United States) J Steven	2	3
(Bulgaria) Mag Maleeva	6	6
(Czechoslovakia) K Kroupová	2	1
Q	(United States) S Stafford	6	1	5
3	(United States) M Navratilova	4	6	7

Second round
15	(Bulgaria) K Maleeva	6	6
(Belgium) D Monami	3	4
(United States) C Rubin	7^{7}	6
(Australia) N Provis	6^{1}	3
Q	(United States) N Arendt	6^{2}	6^{10}
(United States) K Po	7^{7}	7^{12}
(Bulgaria) Mag Maleeva	6	0	6
3	(United States) M Navratilova	4	6	3

Third round
15	(Bulgaria) K Maleeva	4	6	4
(United States) C Rubin	6	3	6
(United States) K Po	2	3
(Bulgaria) Mag Maleeva	6	6

Fourth round
(United States) C Rubin	5	7	1
(Bulgaria) Mag Maleeva	7	5	6

==== Section 7 ====
First round
5	(Spain) A Sánchez Vicario	5	6	6
(Latvia) L Neiland	7	2	2
WC	(United States) L Davenport	6	6
(Indonesia) N Basuki	4	4
(United States) P Fendick	1	3
(Japan) N Sawamatsu	6	6
(France) A Dechaume	6	0	6^{4}
(Georgia (country)) L Meskhi	4	6	7^{7}
(France) C Mothes-Jobkel	2	0
(Australia) R McQuillan	6	6
(United States) S Sloane-Lundy	3	4
Q	(United States) N London	6	6
(Italy) F Perfetti	6	0	3
(Germany) S Meier	4	6	6
(Canada) H Kelesi	5	0
14	(United States) Z Garrison	7	6

Second round
5	(Spain) A Sánchez Vicario	6	6
WC	(United States) L Davenport	2	1
(Japan) N Sawamatsu	3	6	6
(Georgia (country)) L Meskhi	6	4	4
(Australia) R McQuillan	6	7^{7}
Q	(United States) N London	1	6^{5}
(Germany) S Meier	2	6	4
14	(United States) Z Garrison	6	2	6

Third round
5	(Spain) A Sánchez Vicario	6	6
(Japan) N Sawamatsu	1	3
(Australia) R McQuillan	3	1
14	(United States) Z Garrison	6	6

Fourth round
5	(Spain) A Sánchez Vicario	6	6
14	(United States) Z Garrison	0	1

==== Section 8 ====
First round
12	(France) N Tauziat	6	6
(Croatia) N Ercegović	3	2
(Argentina) M Paz	2	6	4
(South Africa) A Coetzer	6	4	6
(Croatia) I Majoli	6	6
(South Africa) M de Swardt	4	4
(Argentina) F Labat	6	6
(Italy) L Golarsa	4	2
(Italy) A-M Cecchini	4	3
(Canada) R Simpson-Alter	6	6
(Argentina) B Fulco-Villella	3	4
(Finland) N Dahlman	6	6
(United States) P Shriver	6	6
(Spain) N Pérez Peñate	2	4
(United States) H Cioffi	0	2
2	(Germany) S Graf	6	6

Second round
12	(France) N Tauziat	0	0
(South Africa) A Coetzer	6	6
(Croatia) I Majoli	3	3
(Argentina) F Labat	6	6
(Canada) Simpson-Alter	4	4
(Finland) N Dahlman	6	6
(United States) P Shriver	5	3
2	(Germany) S Graf	7	6

Third round
(South Africa) A Coetzer	3	6	4
(Argentina) F Labat	6	4	6
(Finland) N Dahlman	4	2
2	(Germany) S Graf	6	6

Fourth round
(Argentina) F Labat	2	2
2	(Germany) S Graf	6	6

Preceded by 1992 Wimbledon Championships – Women's singles	Grand Slam women's singles	Succeeded by 1993 Australian Open – Women's singles
