= 1998 Singapore Open =

- Date: 12–18 October
- Edition: 7th
- Category: Championship Series
- Draw: 32S / 16D
- Surface: Hard / indoor
- Location: Singapore, Singapore
- Venue: Singapore Indoor Stadium

Champions

Singles
- (Chile) Marcelo Ríos

Doubles
- (Australia) Todd Woodbridge / (Australia) Mark Woodforde
- Singapore Open

The 1998 Singapore Open was a men's tennis tournament played on indoor hard courts in Singapore, Singapore that was part of the Championship Series of the 1998 ATP Tour. It was the seventh edition of the tournament and was held from 12 October until 18 October 1998. First-seeded Marcelo Ríos won the singles title.

== Finals ==
=== Singles ===
(Chile) Marcelo Ríos defeated (Australia) Mark Woodforde, 6–4, 6–2

- It was Ríos' 7th and last singles title of the year and the 12th of his career.

=== Doubles ===
(Australia) Todd Woodbridge / (Australia) Mark Woodforde defeated (India) Mahesh Bhupathi / (India) Leander Paes, 6–2, 6–3
