= 1989 Singapore Open – Singles =

Singles
- 1989 Singapore Open

Final
- Champion: (United States) Kelly Jones
- Runner-up: (Israel) Amos Mansdorf
- Score: 6–1, 7–5

Details
- Draw: 32
- Seeds: 8

Events
Singles	Doubles
Singapore Open	· 1990 →

Kelly Jones won in the final 6–1, 7–5 against Amos Mansdorf.

== Seeds ==
A champion seed is indicated in bold text while text in italics indicates the round in which that seed was eliminated.

1. (United States) Kevin Curren (semifinals)
2. (Israel) Amos Mansdorf (final)
3. (Australia) John Fitzgerald (first round)
4. (Australia) Wally Masur (semifinals)
5. (Czechoslovakia) Milan Šrejber (first round)
6. (United States) Richard Matuszewski (first round)
7. (United States) Jim Pugh (quarterfinals)
8. (New Zealand) Kelly Evernden (quarterfinals)

== Draw ==
=== Key ===
- Q = Qualifier
- WC = Wild card
- LL = Lucky loser
- Alt = Alternate
- SE = Special exempt
- PR = Protected ranking
- ITF = ITF entry
- JE = Junior exempt
- w/o = Walkover
- r = Retired
- d = Defaulted
- SR = Special ranking

First round
1	(United States) **K Curren**	**6**	**6**
(Canada) G Michibata	1	1
Q	(South Korea) Young Min-kwon	**6**	3	4
(Sweden) **J Carlsson**	4	**6**	**6**
(Australia) J Stoltenberg	**6**	5	4
(Sweden) **T Nydahl**	3	**7**	**6**
(Canada) G Connell	6	3
7	(United States) **J Pugh**	**7**	**6**
3	(Australia) J Fitzgerald	6	1
(Australia) **R Fromberg**	**7**	**6**
(United States) **J Grabb**	**6**	**6**
(United States) J Rive	3	3
(United States) M Anger	4	**6**	2
Q	(United States) **K Jones**	**6**	4	**6**
WC	(United States) **R Leach**	**6**	**6**
6	(United States) R Matuszewski	2	2
5	(Czechoslovakia) M Šrejber	4	**6**	3
(Finland) **O Rahnasto**	**6**	2	**6**
(India) V Amritraj	0	6
(United States) **P Chamberlin**	**6**	**7**
(Italy) **G Pozzi**	**6**	6	**6**
(Kenya) P Wekesa	3	**7**	2
(United States) G Layendecker	6	1
4	(Australia) **W Masur**	**7**	**6**
8	(New Zealand) **K Evernden**	**7**	**6**
(India) Z Ali	6	4
(West Germany) **C Saceanu**	**6**	**6**
Q	(United States) L Scott	2	4
(United States) D Pate	6	2
(Sweden) **T Svantesson**	**7**	**6**
Q	(Denmark) M Christensen	3	**6**	2
2	(Israel) **A Mansdorf**	**6**	4	**6**

Second round
1	(United States) **K Curren**	**6**	**6**
(Sweden) J Carlsson	3	3
(Sweden) T Nydahl	0	6
7	(United States) **J Pugh**	**6**	**7**
(Australia) R Fromberg	**7**	3	6
(United States) **J Grabb**	6	**6**	**7**
Q	(United States) **K Jones**	**6**	**6**
WC	(United States) R Leach	3	2
(Finland) O Rahnasto	3	**6**	3
(United States) **P Chamberlin**	**6**	2	**6**
(Italy) G Pozzi	4	2
4	(Australia) **W Masur**	**6**	**6**
8	(New Zealand) **K Evernden**	**6**	**6**
(West Germany) C Saceanu	4	2
(Sweden) T Svantesson	1	2
2	(Israel) **A Mansdorf**	**6**	**6**

Quarterfinals
1	(United States) **K Curren**	**6**	**6**
7	(United States) J Pugh	4	2
(United States) J Grabb	4	**6**	5
Q	(United States) **K Jones**	**6**	2	**7**
(United States) P Chamberlin	3	4
4	(Australia) **W Masur**	**6**	**6**
8	(New Zealand) K Evernden	6	1
2	(Israel) **A Mansdorf**	**7**	**6**

Semifinals
1	(United States) K Curren
Q	(United States) **K Jones**	w/o
4	(Australia) W Masur	6	6
2	(Israel) **A Mansdorf**	**7**	**7**

Final
Q	(United States) **Kelly Jones**	**6**	**7**
2	(Israel) Amos Mansdorf	1	5
