= 1994 Singapore Classic – Singles =

Singles
- 1994 Singapore Classic

Final
- Champion: (Japan) Naoko Sawamatsu
- Runner-up: (Argentina) Florencia Labat
- Score: 7–5, 7–5

Details
- Draw: 32
- Seeds: 8

Events
Singles	Doubles
- WTA Singapore Open

Naoko Sawamatsu successfully defended her title by defeating Florencia Labat 7–5, 7–5 in the final.

== Seeds ==
1. (Japan) Naoko Sawamatsu (champion)
2. (United States) Patty Fendick (second round)
3. (n/a)
4. (Argentina) Florencia Labat (final)
5. (United States) Meredith McGrath (first round)
6. (United States) Linda Harvey Wild (quarterfinals)
7. (United States) Marianne Werdel (first round)
8. (Australia) Rachel McQuillan (second round)

== Draw ==
Key

- Q = Qualifier
- WC = Wild card
- LL = Lucky loser
- Alt = Alternate
- ITF = ITF entry
- PR = Protected ranking
- SR = Special ranking
- SE = Special exempt
- JE = Junior exempt
- JR = Junior Accelerator Programme entrant
- CO = College Accelerator Programme entrant
- NG = Next Gen Accelerator Program entrant
- w/o = Walkover
- r = Retired
- d = Defaulted

=== Finals ===
Semifinals
1	(Japan) Naoko Sawamatsu	7	6
(United States) Nicole Arendt	5	2
4	(Argentina) Florencia Labat	6	6
(China) Li Fang	3	1

Final
1	(Japan) Naoko Sawamatsu	7	7
4	(Argentina) Florencia Labat	5	5

=== Top half ===
First round
1	(Japan) N Sawamatsu	6	6
(Czech Republic) E Švíglerová	3	1
(Czech Republic) L Richterová	6	6
WC	(Singapore) Lela Zainal	1	1
Q	(Belgium) N Feber	1	3
(Australia) J Byrne	6	6
(Italy) N Baudone	4	6	6
6	(United States) L Harvey Wild	6	3	7
LL	(South Africa) T Price	6	6
LL	(United States) A Henricksson	4	2
(Australia) K Radford	6	6
(Japan) A Sugiyama	1	2
(United States) T Whitlinger-Jones	6	7
Q	(Japan) N Kijimuta	4	5
(United States) N Arendt	7	3	6
7	(United States) M Werdel	5	6	2

Second round
1	(Japan) N Sawamatsu	6	6
(Czech Republic) L Richterová	4	1
(Australia) J Byrne	2	3
6	(United States) L Harvey Wild	6	6
LL	(South Africa) T Price	2	6	7
(Australia) K Radford	6	3	6
(United States) T Whitlinger-Jones	3	3
(United States) N Arendt	6	6

Quarterfinals
1	(Japan) N Sawamatsu	6	6
6	(United States) L Harvey Wild	1	3
LL	(South Africa) T Price	3	6
(United States) N Arendt	6	7

Semifinals
1	(Japan) N Sawamatsu	7	6
(United States) N Arendt	5	2

=== Bottom half ===
First round
5	(United States) M McGrath	2	2
Q	(United States) J Steven	6	6
WC	(Indonesia) N Soetrisno	6	6
LL	(Netherlands) P Kamstra	3	2
(Australia) M Jaggard-Lai	1	6	6
(Austria) B Paulus	6	3	2
Q	(Japan) R Hiraki	3	0
4	(Argentina) F Labat	6	6
8	(Australia) R McQuillan	6	7
(Indonesia) R Tedjakusuma	1	5
(France) S Testud	5	1
(Japan) Y Kamio	7	6
(Czech Republic) A Strnadová	4	1
(China) F Li	6	6
(Belgium) S Wasserman	0	3
2	(United States) P Fendick	6	6

Second round
Q	(United States) J Steven	7	6
WC	(Indonesia) N Soetrisno	6	2
(Australia) M Jaggard-Lai	3	6	2
4	(Argentina) F Labat	6	1	6
8	(Australia) R McQuillan	6	3	3
(Japan) Y Kamio	4	6	6
(China) F Li	6	4	6
2	(United States) P Fendick	1	6	4

Quarterfinals
Q	(United States) J Steven	0	4
4	(Argentina) F Labat	6	6
(Japan) Y Kamio	3	6	3
(China) F Li	6	0	6

Semifinals
4	(Argentina) F Labat	6	6
(China) F Li	3	1
