= 2025 Singapore Tennis Open – Singles =

Singles
- 2025 Singapore Tennis Open

Final
- Champion: (Belgium) Elise Mertens
- Runner-up: (United States) Ann Li
- Score: 6–1, 6–4

Details
- Draw: 32
- Seeds: 8

Events
Singles	Doubles
- WTA Singapore Open

Elise Mertens defeated Ann Li in the final, 6–1, 6–4 to win the singles tennis title at the 2025 Singapore Tennis Open. It was her ninth WTA Tour singles title.

This was the first edition of the tournament.

== Seeds ==
1. Anna Kalinskaya (semifinals, retired)
2. (Belgium) Elise Mertens (champion)
3. (United States) Amanda Anisimova (withdrew)
4. (China) Wang Xinyu (semifinals)
5. Polina Kudermetova (first round)
6. (Colombia) Camila Osorio (quarterfinals)
7. (United Kingdom) Emma Raducanu (first round)
8. (Japan) Moyuka Uchijima (first round)

== Draw ==
Key

- Q = Qualifier
- WC = Wild card
- LL = Lucky loser
- Alt = Alternate
- ITF = ITF entry
- PR = Protected ranking
- SR = Special ranking
- SE = Special exempt
- JE = Junior exempt
- JR = Junior Accelerator Programme entrant
- CO = College Accelerator Programme entrant
- NG = Next Gen Accelerator Program entrant
- w/o = Walkover
- r = Retired
- d = Defaulted

=== Finals ===
Semifinals
1	Anna Kalinskaya	6^{2}	0^{r}
(United States) Ann Li	7^{7}	1
4	(China) Wang Xinyu	3	4
2	(Belgium) Elise Mertens	6	6

Final
(United States) Ann Li	1	4
2	(Belgium) Elise Mertens	6	6

=== Top half ===
First round
1	A Kalinskaya	6	4	6
(United States) C Dolehide	4	6	2
(Australia) A Tomljanović	2	3
Q	(Switzerland) S Waltert	6	6
Q	(Thailand) M Sawangkaew	6	7^{7}
Q	(China) S Wei	4	6^{2}
(Spain) C Bucșa	5	7	7
7	(United Kingdom) E Raducanu	7	5	5
LL	M Timofeeva	6	7^{7}
(China) Xiy Wang	3	6^{3}
(United States) A Li	6	6
(Australia) D Saville	3	1
(Mexico) R Zarazúa	6	0	3
(United States) H Baptiste	2	6	6
WC	(Australia) K Birrell	6	6
5	P Kudermetova	3	2

Second round
1	A Kalinskaya	6	7^{7}
Q	(Switzerland) S Waltert	2	6^{3}
Q	(Thailand) M Sawangkaew	6	6
(Spain) C Bucșa	4	4
LL	M Timofeeva	3	2
(United States) A Li	6	6
(United States) H Baptiste	7^{7}	3	5
WC	(Australia) K Birrell	6^{3}	6	7

Quarterfinals
1	A Kalinskaya	6	4	6
Q	(Thailand) M Sawangkaew	3	6	0
(United States) A Li	7^{7}	7^{7}
WC	(Australia) K Birrell	6^{2}	6^{4}

Semifinals
1	A Kalinskaya	6^{2}	0^{r}
(United States) A Li	7^{7}	1

=== Bottom half ===
First round
8	(Japan) M Uchijima	1	7^{7}	2
(Australia) O Gadecki	6	6^{1}	6
Q	(Switzerland) J Teichmann	6	6
(United Kingdom) H Dart	3	1
Q	(Australia) M Joint	4	6	7
(United States) A Parks	6	1	5
(Canada) R Marino	4	7	5
4	(China) Xin Wang	6	5	7
6	(Colombia) C Osorio	6	6^{0}	6
(United States) B Pera	1	7^{7}	3
Q	(Czech Republic) D Šalková	7^{7}	6
E Andreeva	6^{5}	2
(Ukraine) Y Starodubtseva	6	1	2
(Germany) T Maria	2	6	6
(United States) T Townsend	1	0
2	(Belgium) E Mertens	6	6

Second round
(Australia) O Gadecki	4	4
Q	(Switzerland) J Teichmann	6	6
Q	(Australia) M Joint	4	2
4	(China) Xin Wang	6	6
6	(Colombia) C Osorio	3	6	6
Q	(Czech Republic) D Šalková	6	2	4
(Germany) T Maria	7^{7}	3	1
2	(Belgium) E Mertens	6^{3}	6	6

Quarterfinals
Q	(Switzerland) J Teichmann	7^{7}	6^{5}	4
4	(China) Xin Wang	6^{5}	7^{7}	6
6	(Colombia) C Osorio	4	2
2	(Belgium) E Mertens	6	6

Semifinals
4	(China) Xin Wang	3	4
2	(Belgium) E Mertens	6	6

== Qualifying ==
=== Seeds ===
1. (Australia) Maya Joint (qualified)
2. (Japan) Aoi Ito (first round)
3. (Slovakia) Anna Karolína Schmiedlová (first round)
4. (China) Wei Sijia (qualified)
5. (Latvia) Darja Semeņistaja (first round)
6. (France) Chloé Paquet (first round)
7. (Switzerland) Jil Teichmann (qualified)
8. Maria Timofeeva (qualifying competition, lucky loser)
9. (Philippines) Alexandra Eala (qualifying competition)
10. (Thailand) Mananchaya Sawangkaew (qualified)
11. (Japan) Nao Hibino (qualifying competition)
12. (China) Zhu Lin (qualifying competition, retired)

=== Qualifiers ===
1. (Australia) Maya Joint
2. (Thailand) Mananchaya Sawangkaew
3. (Czech Republic) Dominika Šalková
4. (China) Wei Sijia
5. (Switzerland) Jil Teichmann
6. (Switzerland) Simona Waltert

=== Lucky loser ===
1. Maria Timofeeva

=== Qualifying draw ===
==== First qualifier ====
First round
1	(Australia) Maya Joint	7	6
(Japan) Mai Hontama	5	2
WC	(Singapore) Audrey Tong	0	0
12	(China) Zhu Lin	6	6

Qualifying competition
1	(Australia) Maya Joint	4	6	2
12	(China) Zhu Lin	6	3	0^{r}

==== Second qualifier ====
First round
2	(Japan) Aoi Ito	4	2
WC	(China) Zheng Saisai	6	6
(Thailand) Lanlana Tararudee	3	1
10	(Thailand) Mananchaya Sawangkaew	6	6

Qualifying competition
WC	(China) Zheng Saisai	2	1
10	(Thailand) Mananchaya Sawangkaew	6	6

==== Third qualifier ====
First round
3	(Slovakia) Anna Karolína Schmiedlová	4	6^{6}
(Czech Republic) Dominika Šalková	6	7^{8}
WC	(Singapore) Lynelle Lim	0	0
11	(Japan) Nao Hibino	6	6

Qualifying competition
(Czech Republic) Dominika Šalková	6	6
11	(Japan) Nao Hibino	4	1

==== Fourth qualifier ====
First round
4	(China) Wei Sijia	6	6
WC	(France) Eva Marie Desvignes	1	2
(United Kingdom) Heather Watson	2	4
8	Maria Timofeeva	6	6

Qualifying competition
4	(China) Wei Sijia	4	6	6
8	Maria Timofeeva	6	4	4

==== Fifth qualifier ====
First round
5	(Latvia) Darja Semeņistaja	2	6	5
(Australia) Arina Rodionova	6	4	7
(Netherlands) Arianne Hartono	4	0
7	(Switzerland) Jil Teichmann	6	6

Qualifying competition
(Australia) Arina Rodionova	4	2
7	(Switzerland) Jil Teichmann	6	6

==== Sixth qualifier ====
First round
6	(France) Chloé Paquet	3	4
(Switzerland) Simona Waltert	6	6
(Japan) Sara Saito	1	7^{7}	5
9	(Philippines) Alexandra Eala	6	6^{1}	7

Qualifying competition
(Switzerland) Simona Waltert	6	6
9	(Philippines) Alexandra Eala	3	2
