= 1990 DHL Singapore Open =

- Date: 23–29 April
- Edition: 5th
- Category: Tier IV
- Draw: 56S / 16D
- Prize money: $150,000
- Surface: Hard / outdoor
- Location: Singapore
- Venue: Kallang Tennis Centre

Champions

Singles
- (Japan) Naoko Sawamatsu

Doubles
- (United Kingdom) Jo Durie / (Canada) Jill Hetherington
← 1989 ·	WTA Singapore Open	· 1994 →

The 1990 DHL Singapore Open was a women's tennis tournament played on outdoor hard courts at the Kallang Tennis Centre in Singapore and was part of the Tier IV category of the 1990 WTA Tour. It was the fifth edition of the tournament and took place from 23 April through 29 April 1990. Unseeded Naoko Sawamatsu won the singles title.

== Finals ==
=== Singles ===
(Japan) Naoko Sawamatsu defeated (United Kingdom) Sarah Loosemore 7–6^{(7–5)}, 3–6, 6–4

- It was Sawamatsu's first singles title of her career.

=== Doubles ===
(United Kingdom) Jo Durie / (Canada) Jill Hetherington defeated (France) Pascale Paradis / (France) Catherine Suire 6–4, 6–1

- It was Durie's 1st doubles title of the year and the 5th and last of her career. It was Hetherington's 1st doubles title of the year and the 10th of her career.

== See also ==
- 1990 Epson Singapore Super Tennis - men's tournament
