= 1994 Singapore Classic =

- Date: 18–24 April
- Edition: 5th
- Category: Tier IV
- Draw: 32S / 16D
- Prize money: $100,000
- Surface: Hard / outdoor
- Location: Kallang, Singapore
- Venue: Kallang Tennis Centre

Champions

Singles
- (Japan) Naoko Sawamatsu

Doubles
- (United States) Patty Fendick / (United States) Meredith McGrath
← 1990 ·	WTA Singapore Open

The 1994 Singapore Classic was a women's tennis tournament played on outdoor hard courts at the Kallang Tennis Centre in Kallang, Singapore that was part of the Tier IV category of the 1994 WTA Tour. It was the sixth and last edition of the tournament and took place from 18 April through 24 April 1994. First-seeded Naoko Sawamatsu won the singles title.

== Finals ==
=== Singles ===
(Japan) Naoko Sawamatsu defeated (Argentina) Florencia Labat 7–5, 7–5

- It was Sawamatsu's 1st singles title of the year and the 3rd of her career.

=== Doubles ===
(United States) Patty Fendick / (United States) Meredith McGrath defeated (United States) Nicole Arendt / (Australia) Kristine Radford 6–4, 6–1

- It was Fendick's 4th doubles title of the year and the 24th and last of her career. It was McGrath's 4th doubles title of the year and the 13th of her career.
