= 2025 Singapore Tennis Open =

- Date: 27 January – 2 February
- Edition: 1st
- Category: WTA 250
- Draw: 32S / 24Q / 16D
- Prize money: $275,094
- Surface: Hard (Indoor)
- Location: Singapore
- Venue: Kallang Tennis Hub

Champions

Singles
- (Belgium) Elise Mertens

Doubles
- (United States) Desirae Krawczyk / (Mexico) Giuliana Olmos
WTA Singapore Open	· 2026 →

The 2025 Singapore Tennis Open was a WTA tournament played on indoor hardcourts as part of the 2025 WTA Tour. The event took place at the Kallang Tennis Hub in Singapore from 27 January through 2 February 2025. The tournament marked a return of the WTA Tour to Singapore after a seven-year absence since the 2018 WTA Finals.

== Champions ==
=== Singles ===
- (Belgium) Elise Mertens def. (United States) Ann Li 6–1, 6–4

=== Doubles ===
- (United States) Desirae Krawczyk / (Mexico) Giuliana Olmos def. (China) Wang Xinyu / (China) Zheng Saisai 7–5, 6–0

== Singles main draw entrants ==
=== Seeds ===
Country	Player	Rank^{1}	Seed
	Anna Kalinskaya	15	1
BEL	Elise Mertens	34	2
~~USA~~	~~Amanda Anisimova~~	~~35~~	~~3~~
CHN	Wang Xinyu	37	4
	Polina Kudermetova	57	5
COL	Camila Osorio	59	6
GBR	Emma Raducanu	61	7
JPN	Moyuka Uchijima	63	8

- Rankings are as of 13 January 2025.

=== Other entrants ===
The following players received wildcards into the singles main draw:

- ~~(United States) Amanda Anisimova~~
- (Australia) Kimberly Birrell

The following players received entry from the qualifying draw:

- (Australia) Maya Joint
- (Czech Republic) Dominika Šalková
- (Thailand) Mananchaya Sawangkaew
- (Switzerland) Jil Teichmann
- (Switzerland) Simona Waltert
- (China) Wei Sijia

=== Withdrawals ===
- (United States) Amanda Anisimova → replaced by Maria Timofeeva
- (United Kingdom) Sonay Kartal → replaced by (United Kingdom) Harriet Dart
- (United States) Sofia Kenin → replaced by (Ukraine) Yuliia Starodubtseva
- (Argentina) Nadia Podoroska → replaced by (Canada) Rebecca Marino
- (China) Wang Yafan → replaced by (Spain) Cristina Bucșa

== Doubles main draw entrants ==
=== Seeds ===
Country	Player	Country	Player	Rank^{†}	Seed
USA	Caroline Dolehide	USA	Taylor Townsend	19	1
USA	Desirae Krawczyk	MEX	Giuliana Olmos	51	2
CHN	Wang Xinyu	CHN	Zheng Saisai	124	3
GBR	Harriet Dart	GBR	Maia Lumsden	143	4

- ^{1} Rankings as of 13 January 2025.
