= 1989 Singapore Open =

Tennis tournament

- Date: 24–30 April
- Edition: 1st
- Draw: 32S / 14D
- Prize money: $93,000
- Surface: Hard / outdoor
- Location: Singapore
- Venue: National Stadium

Champions

Singles
- (United States) Kelly Jones

Doubles
- (United States) Rick Leach / (United States) Jim Pugh
- Singapore Open

The 1989 Singapore Open (known as Epson Singapore Super Tennis for sponsorship reasons) was a men's tennis tournament played on outdoor hard courts at the National Stadium in Singapore and was part of the 1989 Nabisco Grand Prix. The tournament took place from 24 April through 30 April 1989. Unseeded Kelly Jones, who entered the main draw as a qualifier, won the singles title.

== Finals ==
=== Singles ===
(United States) Kelly Jones defeated (Israel) Amos Mansdorf 6–1, 7–5

- It was Jones' only title of the year and the 3rd of his career.

=== Doubles ===
(United States) Rick Leach / (United States) Jim Pugh defeated (United States) Paul Chamberlin / (Kenya) Paul Wekesa 6–3, 6–4

- It was Leach's 3rd title of the year and the 13th of his career. It was Pugh's 3rd title of the year and the 13th of his career.

== See also ==
- 1989 DHL Open - women's tournament
