= Singapore Open Championships =

Defunct tennis tournament
- Tour: ITF World Circuit (Asia)
- Founded: 1921
- Abolished: 1986
- Editions: 65
- Location: Singapore
- Venue: Singapore Cricket Club
- Surface: Grass

The Singapore Open Championships or simply the Singapore Championships was a combined ITF affiliated men's and women's grass court tennis tournament founded in 1921 and held at the Singapore Cricket Club, Singapore. It was the organised by the Singapore Tennis Association (STA) and was the successor event to the earlier Championship of Singapore (1883-1907) that was played at the same venue. Also known as the Singapore Grass Court Championships it was usually always played in November and ran annually with breaks until the 1986.

The event was part of the ILTF Asian Circuit. The inaugural mens singles was won by Japanese player Shunjiro Nakamura who defeated compatriot Asaji Honda in the final. The winner of the final mens singles was New Zealand player Steve Guy.

== See also ==
- ATP Singapore Open (men's tour event founded in 1989).
- WTA Singapore Open (women's tour event founded in 1986)
