= Tamaka Takagi =

Japanese tennis player (born 1965)

- Full name: Tamaka Takagi
- Country (sports): Japan
- Born: 30 December 1965 (age 59)
- Prize money: $93,073

Singles
- Highest ranking: No. 113 (4 March 1991)

Grand Slam singles results
- Australian Open: 2R (1991)
- French Open: 1R (1991)

Doubles
- Highest ranking: No. 151 (20 November 1989)

Grand Slam doubles results
- Australian Open: 1R (1990)

Tamaka Takagi (born 30 December 1965) is a former professional tennis player from Japan.

== Biography ==
Takagi, who comes from Fukuoka, played collegiate tennis in the United States for the University of Kentucky before playing professionally.

On the WTA Tour her best performances include making the round of 16 at the 1989 OTB Open in Schenectady and the quarter-finals of the 1990 Singapore Open.

She reached her career best ranking in 1991, 113 in the world, which she attained after beating Kathy Rinaldi in the first round at Palm Springs.

During her career she featured in the main draws of both the Australian Open and French Open. Her only grand slam win came at the 1991 Australian Open, where she beat world number 41 Patty Fendick in the opening round.

== ITF finals ==
$50,000 tournaments
$25,000 tournaments
$10,000 tournaments

=== Singles (1–4) ===
Outcome	No.	Date	Tournament	Surface	Opponent	Score
Runner-up	1.	30 June 1985	Spartanburg, United States	Clay	(United States) Caroline Kuhlman	2–6, 1–6
Winner	1.	16 October 1988	Kofu, Japan	Grass	(Japan) Ei Iida	2–6, 6–3, 6–3
Runner-up	2.	23 October 1988	Kuroshio, Japan	Hard	(Japan) Maya Kidowaki	1–6, 3–6
Runner-up	3.	30 April 1990	Bangkok, Thailand	Hard	(New Zealand) Julie Richardson	6–4, 3–6, 2–6
Runner-up	4.	23 September 1990	Kofu, Japan	Hard	(United States) Marianne Werdel	4-6, 6-4, 2-6

=== Doubles (0–2) ===
Outcome	No.	Date	Tournament	Surface	Partner	Opponents	Score
Runner-up	1.	15 October 1989	Nagasaki, Japan	Hard	(Australia) Kate McDonald	(Japan) Ei Iida (Japan) Maya Kidowaki	2–6, 6–3, 2–6
Runner-up	2.	1 March 1992	Miami, United States	Hard	(Australia) Tracey Morton-Rodgers	(United States) Lindsay Davenport (United States) Katie Schlukebir	1-6, 3-6
