= Jana Strnadová =

Czech tennis player

- Country (sports): Czechoslovakia; Czech Republic
- Born: 25 May 1972 (age 54)
- Plays: Left-handed
- Prize money: $7,036

Singles
- Career record: 24–34
- Highest ranking: No. 434 (14 Jan 1991)

Doubles
- Career record: 20–35
- Highest ranking: No. 333 (26 Nov 1990)

Jana Strnadová (born 25 May 1972) is a Czech former professional tennis player.

Strnadová, a left-handed player, attained a career high singles ranking of 434 on the professional tour. In 1991 she featured in the doubles main draw of a WTA Tour tournament in Colorado partnering her younger sister Nicola.

From 1992 to 1996 she was an accomplished tennis player for Syracuse University, where she was an All-American for singles in 1994 and amassed a team record 202 combined career wins. Her sister Nicola was a teammate.

== ITF finals ==
=== Doubles: 1 (0–1) ===
Outcome	No.	Date	Tournament	Surface	Partner	Opponents	Score
Runner-up	1.	11 November 1990	Fez, Morocco	Clay	(Czechoslovakia) Nicole Strnadová	(Netherlands) Babette Eijsvogel (Netherlands) Eva Haslinghuis	0-6, 6-2, 1-6
