= Julie Steven =

American tennis player

- Full name: Julie Spalding-Steven
- Country (sports): United States
- Born: April 24, 1976 (age 49)
- Height: 165 cm (5 ft 5 in)
- Plays: Right-handed
- Prize money: $130,432

Singles
- Career record: 110-117
- Career titles: 0
- Highest ranking: No. 173 (August 1, 1994)

Grand Slam singles results
- US Open: 1R (1992, 1993, 1994)

Doubles
- Career record: 64-59
- Career titles: 4 ITF
- Highest ranking: No. 101 (February 12, 1996)

Grand Slam doubles results
- Australian Open: 1R (1995)
- Wimbledon: 1R (1994)
- US Open: 2R (1994)

Julie Spalding-Steven (born April 24, 1976) is an American former professional tennis player, coach, and businesswoman.

== Biography ==
=== Tennis career ===
Steven grew up in Wichita, Kansas, and had a successful career in junior tennis, culminating in a junior US Open title. Throughout her career, she played in all 4 grand slams. She had a win over Lindsay Davenport at the 1991 junior US Open, then lost to the same player in the girls' singles final the following year. At the 1992 Wimbledon Championships, she was runner-up in the girls' doubles, partnering Pam Nelson. Her US Open title came in 1993, with Nicole London in the girls' doubles and she also made the singles semifinals that year.

As a professional player, she reached a best singles ranking of 173 in the world and made three US Open appearances as a singles wildcard. In addition to the US Open, she also played in the women's doubles main draws at Wimbledon and the Australian Open. In 1993, she was a member of the Wichita Advantage team which won the World TeamTennis championship. She is the only junior who has ever won the World Team Tennis Championship Her best performance on the WTA Tour was a quarter-final appearance at the 1994 Singapore Classic.

=== Professional career ===
Following her successes in tennis, Steven moved to the coaching space where she coached top juniors and collegiate players in the south Florida area. She led 9 juniors to reach top 10 national rankings and 2 players to win NCAA singles titles. In 2019, Steven opened Coral Oaks Tennis and Wellness, where she coached members in tennis, fitness, and mindset. In 2023, Steven started PIVOT, a fitness and nutrition business to help women find purpose and peace.
