= Monique Javer =

American-born British professional tennis player

- Full name: Monique Alicia Javer
- Country (sports): United Kingdom
- Residence: Hillsborough, California, US
- Born: 22 July 1967 (age 59) Burlingame, California, US
- Height: 1.77 m (5 ft 9 1/2 in)
- Turned pro: 1985
- Retired: 2000
- Plays: Right-handed
- Prize money: US$314,616

Singles
- Career record: 123–206
- Career titles: 1 WTA (0 ITF)
- Highest ranking: No.56 (21 September 1992)

Grand Slam singles results
- Australian Open: 2R (1988, 1991, 1993)
- French Open: 2R (1990)
- Wimbledon: 2R (1993)
- US Open: 2R (1990)

Doubles
- Career record: 4–32
- Career titles: 0 WTA (0 ITF)
- Highest ranking: No.176 (17 September 1990)

Grand Slam doubles results
- Australian Open: 1R (1991)
- French Open: –
- Wimbledon: 2R (1990, 1991)
- US Open: –

Mixed doubles
- Career titles: 0

Grand Slam mixed doubles results
- Australian Open: –
- French Open: –
- Wimbledon: 2R (1993)
- US Open: –
- Last updated on: 23 March 2010.

Monique Alicia Javer (born 22 July 1967) is an American-born former professional tennis player who represented Great Britain and was at one time the British number 1. She turned professional in 1985 and played her final professional match in 2000. During the course of her career she won one WTA singles title (the 1988 Singapore Open), reached four WTA semifinals and reached a career-high singles ranking of world No.56 (achieved 21 September 1992). She also represented Great Britain at the 1992 Barcelona Olympics.

Javer managed to reach the second round of all four Grand Slams during her fifteen-year career. She reached the second round of the French Open in 1990, the US Open in 1990 and Wimbledon in 1993. She also progressed to round two of the Australian Open on three occasions in the years 1988, 1991 and 1993, to give her a total of six wins in the main draws of the Grand Slam events.

== Career ==
=== 1985–1987 ===
Javer played her first match on the ITF circuit in June 1985 in a $10,000 tournament but was beaten in the first round. She competed in three more tournaments in 1985, reaching the second round of a WTA event, the quarterfinals of another $10,000 ITF event and losing in the second round of a final $10,000 ITF.

Javer began her 1986 season by reaching the quarterfinals of a $10,000 ITF event in Chicago. She had no more notable results into July when she won three matches to qualify for a WTA Tour event. She won two more in the main draw to reach the quarterfinals for the first time in her career where she was beaten by the number three seed, Melissa Gurney, 1–6, 5–7. Monique spent the rest of the season competing in the qualifying rounds for WTA events. Her 1986 year-end ranking was world No.168.

In her first event of 1987, Javer qualified for the second round of the Bausch & Lomb Championships on Amelia Island. As with the previous year, Javer spent the majority of the remainder of the season trying to qualify for WTA events but did not manage to pass the first round of any. Her 1987 year-end ranking was world No.159.

=== 1988 ===
Javer began her 1988 season strongly by reaching the second round of the Australian Open. This was the first time she had won a match in the main draw of a Grand Slam. She then went on to reach the second round of the newly categorised Tier V WTA event in Auckland, New Zealand. In April she won three matches to qualify for the Suntory Japan Open, the third of which was against compatriot, Sarah Loosemore. In the main draw she beat Barbara Gerken in the first round to set up a clash with top seed and world No.13, Natasha Zvereva. Javer caused a huge upset by beating Zvereva in straight sets, 7–6^{(3)}, 6–2, to reach the quarterfinals where she was beaten by world No.28, Stephanie Rehe, 5–7, 1–6. Immediately following this result, Monique caused another shock by winning the title at the tier V WTA tournament in Singapore. Despite being unseeded Javer beat the world No.30 and No.3 seed, Dianne Balestrat, in the semifinals, 6–0, 6–1. She went on to beat the No.4 seed, Leila Meskhi, in the final, 7–6^{(3)}, 6–3. Javer's best results over the rest of the year were second round showings in Eastbourne (where she lost to the eventual champion, Martina Navratilova) and Los Angeles. She ended her season by competing for Great Britain in the Wightman Cup. She lost her match with Patty Fendick, 6–2, 6–1. Javer achieved the first of her two year-end top 100 rankings, ending 1988 as the world No.73.

=== 1989 ===
Javer began 1989 with four consecutive losses before reaching the second round of the tier III tournament in California. In April she reached the semifinals of the Singapore Open before losing to Akiko Kijimuta, 3–6, 6–4, 0–6. She was the No.7 seed in her next tournament, the Suntory Open but did not progress past the second round. Five consecutive defeats followed before Javer won two matches to qualify for the Virginia Slims of Los Angeles. She was eventually knocked out in the third round by world No.6, Zina Garrison. She progressed past the first round in only one of her tournaments for the rest of the season. Her year-end ranking was world No.113.

=== 1990 ===
The 1990 season began with a number of tour events in the USA for Javer. She reached the second round of the event in Indian Wells before heading to Asia to where she reached the quarterfinals of the Suntory Open and the third round of the Singapore Open. In May, Javer reached the second round of the French Open for the first (and only) time in her career. She defeated Angeliki Kanellopoulou, 4–6, 6–4, 7–5, in round one before losing to Italian, Laura Lapi, in the second round. In her very next tournament she reached the second round in Eastbourne before going on to experience another first round loss in Wimbledon. Javer competed for Great Britain in the Fed Cup in July where she won one of her two singles matches. Following this she reached the second round of the Canadian Open where she came up against the reigning world No.1, Steffi Graf. Javer lost 6–1, 6–2. In August she got her second win of the season in the main draw of a Grand Slam when she reached the second round of the US Open by beating Jennifer Santrock in the first round. Silke Meier defeated Javer in round two. In October, Monique came up against the world No.10, Conchita Martínez, in the semifinals of the Arizona Classic but was beaten 6–1, 6–1. She played two more events this year and lost in the first round of both. She ended 1990 with a singles ranking of world No.101.

=== 1991 ===
In January of 1991, Javer reached the second round of the Australian Open for the second time in her career. She gave the 6th seed, Arantxa Sánchez Vicario, a scare before eventually losing 6–4, 4–6, 2–6. Between the Australian Open and the French Open she reached the second round in a number of tournaments as well as reaching the quarterfinals of the inaugural Pattaya Women's Open. She lost in the first round of both the French Open and Wimbledon before competing for Britain again in the Fed Cup. As in the previous year, Monique won one of her two singles matches. After this, she won only two more matches in 1991. At the end of 1991, her season-ending singles ranking was world No.112.

=== 1992 ===
The 1992 season was a season of two-halves for Javer. Despite losing in the first round of the Australian Open she reached the quarterfinals in Auckland and the semifinals of the Fernleaf Classic. She also reached the quarterfinals of the Suntory Open where she lost to Kimiko Date. She then lost to Yayuk Basuki in the second round of the Pattaya Women's Open before reaching the semifinals of the Malaysian Women's Open in late April. However after this, she lost eleven of her final twelve matches of the season including her matches in the Fed Cup and in the 1992 Summer Olympics. Her ranking at the end of 1992 was world No.72.

=== 1993 ===
Javer began 1993 with a first round loss in the WTA event in Melbourne before heading to the Australian Open where she beat American, Carrie Cunningham, 6–3, 6–1, in round one. She came up against world No.8, Conchita Martínez in the second round and lost in straight sets, 5–7, 1–6. A number of first round losses followed before she reached round two of the PTT Pattaya Open in April, losing to eventual champion, Yayuk Basuki. Later in April she beat Ai Sugiyama to reach the second round of the inaugural Indonesia Open. She then lost to Ann Wunderlich, 1–6, 6–2, 3–6. Javer entered her next tournament, the Volkswagen Cup in Eastbourne, courtesy of a wild card. She also reached the second round of this tournament where she lost to Helena Suková. She then received another wild card, this one into Wimbledon. She reached the second round to give her the first (and only) singles win of her career in the main draw of Wimbledon. She was beaten by the French 16th seed, Nathalie Tauziat, in round two. Following Wimbledon, Monique played eight more tournaments in 1993 but won only one more main draw match. Her year-end ranking was world No.185.

=== 1994–2000 ===
Javer won only three matches in 1994, two of which were in the first and second rounds of the qualifying tournament for the Australian Open and the other in the qualifying rounds for the Peters NSW Open. She ended the season with a win–loss record of 3–14. She ended 1994 as the world No.332

At the start of the 1995 season, Javer's world ranking had fallen to outside the top-500, meaning her ranking was not high enough to grant her direct access to the main draws of WTA events. She played six tournaments in 1995, her best result being at a $10,000 ITF tournament in Edinburgh, where she reached the semifinals. Her year-end ranking was world No.623.

In 1996 Javer played a total of seven tournaments but did not pass the first round in any of them. At the end of 1996, her season-ending ranking had fallen to world No.779.

1997 saw Javer compete in eight tournaments. She only fell in either the qualifying rounds or the first round of each of them with the exception of her final tournament of the season, a $10,000 ITF in Mexico where she reached the second round. She ended the season with a singles ranking of world No.711.

In 1998, Javer did not win a match until May when she reached the second round of a $25,000 ITF in Mexico as a lucky loser. She won only one of her next seven matches, the single win coming in the first round of qualifying for a $25,000 ITF in California. Javer's year-end ranking was world No.662.

Javer played seven tournaments in 1999 but only ended the year with a win–loss record of 3–7. Each of her three wins came in the qualifying rounds of ITF tournaments. By the end of 1999, her singles ranking had fallen to world No.804.

Javer's final year of professional competition was the year 2000. She played 11 tournaments over the course of the year and ended the year with a win–loss record of 6–11. As in previous years, her only wins this year came in the qualifying rounds of ITF events. Her year-end ranking was world No.749.

== WTA tour and ITF circuit titles ==
Legend Grand Slam (0) Tour Championships (0) Tier I Event (0) Tour Event (1) ITF Event (0)	Titles by surface Hard (1) Clay (0) Grass (0) Carpet (0)

=== Singles (1) ===
Result	No.	Date	Tournament	Surface	Opponent	Score
Win	1.	Apr 1988	Singapore	Hard	(Soviet Union) Leila Meskhi	7–6^{(7–3)}, 6–3

== Grand Slam singles performance timeline ==
Key
W	F	SF	QF	#R	RR	Q#	DNQ	A	NH

(W) winner; (F) finalist; (SF) semifinalist; (QF) quarterfinalist; (#R) rounds 4, 3, 2, 1; (RR) round-robin stage; (Q#) qualification round; (DNQ) did not qualify; (A) absent; (NH) not held; (SR) strike rate (events won / competed); (W–L) win–loss record.

Tournament	1986	1987	1988	1989	1990	1991	1992	1993	1994	Career win–loss
Australian Open	A	A	2R	1R	A	2R	1R	2R	LQ	3–5
French Open	A	A	1R	A	2R	1R	1R	A	A	1–4
Wimbledon	A	LQ	1R	1R	1R	1R	1R	2R	1R	1–7
US Open	LQ	1R	1R	A	2R	1R	1R	1R	A	1–6

- The career record is only for the player's main draw participation.
