= Kallang Tennis Centre =

Tennis court in Kallang, Singapore

Coordinates: 1.301551°N 103.877519°E

Kallang Tennis Centre is a tennis court in Kallang, Singapore. It is located along Stadium Boulevard, adjacent to the Kallang Field, and is part of the Kallang Sports Centre. It is located just outside the central business district area.

== History ==
The Kallang Tennis Centre was opened as a community sports facility in March 1978. Since then, it has been a popular venue for tennis programmes and competitions, including hosting the local national schools’ tennis competitions. It is also the training venue for the national team and national youth teams.

The Kallang Tennis Centre is equipped with 14 courts.

== 2010 Summer Youth Olympics ==
Kallang Tennis Centre was used as a competition venue for tennis during the 2010 Summer Youth Olympics.

Temporary seating stands for 2,000 were built around the main court for fans and the media during the Singapore 2010 Youth Olympic Games.

== Kallang Tennis Hub ==
In 2024 a new centre was opened, just south of the old one, between Stadium Walk and Stadium Crescent. It was named Kallang Tennis Hub and features seven indoor courts, twelve outdoor courts and two junior-sized courts. The indoor facility was the competition venue for the 2025 Singapore Tennis Open.
