= Akiko Kijimuta =

Japanese tennis player (born 1968)

Akiko Kijimuta 雉子牟田明子
- Country (sports): Japan
- Born: May 1, 1968 (age 58) Ebina, Kanagawa, Japan
- Height: 162 cm (5 ft 4 in)
- Turned pro: 1983
- Retired: 1994
- Prize money: $323,209

Singles
- Career record: 126–148
- Career titles: 1 ITF
- Highest ranking: No. 49 (March 5, 1990)

Grand Slam singles results
- Australian Open: 3R (1987, 1988)
- French Open: 4R (1992)
- Wimbledon: 3R (1988)
- US Open: 3R (1987)

Doubles
- Career record: 33–63
- Career titles: 1 ITF
- Highest ranking: No. 93 (August 26, 1991)

Grand Slam doubles results
- Australian Open: 2R (1988, 1994)
- French Open: 1R (1991, 1994)
- Wimbledon: 2R (1992)
- US Open: 1R (1991, 1992)

Akiko Kijimuta (雉子牟田 明子, Kijimuta Akiko) is a Japanese former professional tennis player. She was born on May 1, 1968, in Japan and played on the WTA tour from 1986 to 1992. She reached the fourth round at Roland Garros in 1992, where she led the world number-one-ranked player Monica Seles 4 games to 1 in the final set. Seles won the match 6–4 in the third set. She retired with a 63–100 singles record.

== WTA finals ==
=== Singles (0–2) ===
| Result | W/L | Date | Tournament | Surface | Opponents | Score |
|---|---|---|---|---|---|---|
| Loss | 0–1 | Apr 1989 | Singapore, Singapore | Hard | (New Zealand) Belinda Cordwell | 1–6, 0–6 |
| Loss | 0–2 | Dec 1990 | Brisbane, Australia | Hard | (Czechoslovakia) Helena Suková | 4–6, 3–6 |

=== Doubles (0–1) ===
| Result | W/L | Date | Tournament | Surface | Partner | Opponents | Score |
|---|---|---|---|---|---|---|---|
| Loss | 0–1 | Apr 1991 | Tokyo, Japan | Hard | (Japan) Yone Kamio | (United States) Amy Frazier (Japan) Maya Kidowaki | 2–6, 4–6 |

== ITF finals ==
=== Singles (1–1) ===
| Result | No. | Date | Tournament | Surface | Opponent | Score |
|---|---|---|---|---|---|---|
| Win | 1. | 4 November 1984 | Matsuyama, Japan | Hard | (Brazil) Niege Dias | 6-4, 6-3 |
| Loss | 2. | 11 November 1984 | Hiroshima, Japan | Hard | (United States) Joy Cummings | 6-2, 2-6, 2-6 |

=== Doubles (1–1) ===
| Result | No. | Date | Tournament | Surface | Partner | Opponents | Score |
|---|---|---|---|---|---|---|---|
| Loss | 1. | 31 July 1983 | Milan, Italy | Clay | (Japan) Akemi Nishiya | (Italy) Anna Iuale (Czechoslovakia) Lea Plchová | 7-5, 4-6, 3-6 |
| Win | 2. | 16 August 1993 | Arzachena, Italy | Clay | (Japan) Naoko Kijimuta | (Italy) Linda Ferrando (Italy) Silvia Farina Elia | 6–0, 7–5 |
