= ATP Singapore Open =

Singapore Open

Defunct tennis tournament
- Event name: Epson Singapore Super Tennis (1989–92); Heineken Open (1996–99)
- Founded: 1989
- Abolished: 2021
- Editions: 8
- Location: Singapore
- Venue: Kallang Tennis Centre (1989–92); Singapore Indoor Stadium (1996–99); Singapore Sports Hub (2021)
- Category: Grand Prix tour (1989); ATP World Series (1990–92, 96); ATP Championship Series (1997–99); ATP Tour 250 (2021)
- Surface: Hard / outdoor (1989–92); Indoor (1996–99, 2021)

The Singapore Open was a Grand Prix and ATP Tour affiliated tennis tournament played from 1989 to 1992, from 1996 to 1999 and in 2021. It was known as the Epson Singapore Super Tennis until 1992 and the Heineken Open from 1996 to 1999. It was initially played on outdoor hard courts at the Kallang Tennis Centre. For the latter four editions (1996-1999), it was an indoor event at Singapore Indoor Stadium. In 2021, it was played at the Singapore Sports Hub.

== Results ==
=== Men's singles ===
Year	Champions	Runners-up	Score
1989	(United States) Kelly Jones	(Israel) Amos Mansdorf	6–1, 7–5
1990	(United States) Kelly Jones	(Australia) Richard Fromberg	6–4, 2–6, 7–6
1991	(Netherlands) Jan Siemerink	(Israel) Gilad Bloom	6–4, 6–3
1992	(Australia) Simon Youl	(Netherlands) Paul Haarhuis	6–4, 6–1
1993–1995	Not held		
1996	(United States) Jonathan Stark	(United States) Michael Chang	6–4, 6–4
1997	(Sweden) Magnus Gustafsson	(Germany) Nicolas Kiefer	4–6, 6–3, 6–3
1998	(Chile) Marcelo Ríos	(Australia) Mark Woodforde	6–4, 6–2
1999	(Chile) Marcelo Ríos	(Sweden) Mikael Tillström	6–2, 7–6
2000–2020	Not held		
2021	(Australia) Alexei Popyrin	(Kazakhstan) Alexander Bublik	4–6, 6–0, 6–2

=== Men's doubles ===
Year	Champions	Runners-up	Score
1989	(United States) Rick Leach (United States) Jim Pugh	(United States) Paul Chamberlin (Kenya) Paul Wekesa	6–3, 6–4
1990	(Australia) Mark Kratzmann (Australia) Jason Stoltenberg	(Australia) Brad Drewett (Australia) Todd Woodbridge	6–1, 6–0
1991	(Canada) Grant Connell (Canada) Glenn Michibata	(South Africa) Stefan Kruger (South Africa) Christo van Rensburg	6–4, 5–7, 7–6
1992	(Australia) Todd Woodbridge (Australia) Mark Woodforde	(Canada) Grant Connell (Canada) Glenn Michibata	6–7, 6–2, 6–4
1993–1995	Not held		
1996	(Australia) Todd Woodbridge (Australia) Mark Woodforde	(Czech Republic) Martin Damm (Russia) Andrei Olhovskiy	7–6, 7–6
1997	(India) Mahesh Bhupathi (India) Leander Paes	(United States) Rick Leach (United States) Jonathan Stark	6–4, 6–4
1998	(Australia) Todd Woodbridge (Australia) Mark Woodforde	(India) Mahesh Bhupathi (India) Leander Paes	6–2, 6–3
1999	(Belarus) Max Mirnyi (Philippines) Eric Taino	(Australia) Todd Woodbridge (Australia) Mark Woodforde	6–3, 6–4
2000–2020	Not held		
2021	(Belgium) Sander Gillé (Belgium) Joran Vliegen	(Australia) Matthew Ebden (Australia) John-Patrick Smith	6–2, 6–3

== See also ==
- Singapore Open Championships (official ITF combined event 1921 to 1986)
- WTA Singapore Open – women's tournament
