= 1995 US Open – Men's singles qualifying =

Men's singles qualifying
- 1995 US Open

Events
Singles	men	women		boys	girls
Doubles	men	women	mixed	boys	girls
WC Singles	men	women	quad
WC Doubles	men	women	quad
Legends	men	women	mixed

Qualification
Singles	men	women
Doubles	men	women
- US Open

Players who neither had high enough rankings nor received wild cards to enter the main draw of the annual US Open Tennis Championships participated in a qualifying tournament held over several days before the event.

== Seeds ==
1. (Venezuela) Nicolás Pereira (qualified)
2. (France) Jérôme Golmard (qualified)
3. (Sweden) Nicklas Kulti (qualified)
4. (United Kingdom) Chris Wilkinson (first round)
5. (Belgium) Dick Norman (second round)
6. (Australia) Jamie Morgan (first round)
7. (India) Leander Paes (qualifying competition)
8. (Argentina) Marcelo Charpentier (second round)
9. (Slovakia) Ján Krošlák (first round)
10. (United Kingdom) Mark Petchey (qualified)
11. (France) Rodolphe Gilbert (qualifying competition)
12. (Germany) Karsten Braasch (qualified)
13. (United Kingdom) Tim Henman (qualified)
14. (Italy) Daniele Musa (first round)
15. (Canada) Albert Chang (first round)
16. (France) Thierry Guardiola (qualifying competition)
17. (Morocco) Hicham Arazi (qualified)
18. (Spain) Juan-Albert Viloca-Puig (qualified)
19. (Egypt) Tamer El-Sawy (qualifying competition)
20. (United States) Robbie Weiss (qualifying competition)
21. (South Africa) David Nainkin (qualifying competition)
22. (Canada) Daniel Nestor (qualified)
23. (Australia) Paul Kilderry (second round)
24. (Ecuador) Luis Morejón (first round)
25. (The Bahamas) Mark Knowles (qualified)
26. (France) Lionel Barthez (first round)
27. (Italy) Laurence Tieleman (first round)
28. (United Kingdom) Miles Maclagan (first round)
29. (France) Thierry Champion (qualifying competition)
30. (France) Jean-Philippe Fleurian (qualified)
31. (United States) Kenny Thorne (qualifying competition)
32. (France) Gérard Solvès (second round)

== Qualifiers ==
1. (Venezuela) Nicolás Pereira
2. (France) Jérôme Golmard
3. (Sweden) Nicklas Kulti
4. (France) Jean-Philippe Fleurian
5. (Mexico) Leonardo Lavalle
6. (Zimbabwe) Wayne Black
7. (The Bahamas) Mark Knowles
8. (India) Mahesh Bhupathi
9. (Netherlands) Joost Winnink
10. (United Kingdom) Mark Petchey
11. (Canada) Daniel Nestor
12. (Germany) Karsten Braasch
13. (United Kingdom) Tim Henman
14. (South Africa) Neville Godwin
15. (Morocco) Hicham Arazi
16. (Spain) Juan-Albert Viloca-Puig

== Qualifying draw ==
Key

- Q = Qualifier
- WC = Wild card
- LL = Lucky loser
- Alt = Alternate
- ITF = ITF entry
- PR = Protected ranking
- SR = Special ranking
- SE = Special exempt
- JE = Junior exempt
- JR = Junior Accelerator Programme entrant
- CO = College Accelerator Programme entrant
- NG = Next Gen Accelerator Program entrant
- w/o = Walkover
- r = Retired
- d = Defaulted

=== First qualifier ===
First round
1	(Venezuela) Nicolás Pereira	6	6
(South Africa) Ellis Ferreira	1	3
(Finland) Tuomas Ketola	3	6	5
(United States) Doug Flach	6	3	7
(New Zealand) Steven Downs	7	6
(United States) Brian MacPhie	5	2
(France) Daniel Courcol	6	4
31	(United States) Kenny Thorne	7	6

Second round
1	(Venezuela) Nicolás Pereira	6	6	6
(United States) Doug Flach	4	7	4
(New Zealand) Steven Downs	3	6	4
31	(United States) Kenny Thorne	6	4	6

Qualifying competition
1	(Venezuela) Nicolás Pereira	6	6	6
31	(United States) Kenny Thorne	7	2	2

=== Second qualifier ===
First round
2	(France) Jérôme Golmard	7	6
(Finland) Tommi Lenho	5	3
(France) Stéphane Simian	7	6
(Brazil) Egberto Caldas	6	1
(Australia) Grant Doyle	7	6
(Italy) Nicola Bruno	5	2
(United States) Mark Merklein	6	6	2
32	(France) Gérard Solvès	7	4	6

Second round
2	(France) Jérôme Golmard	7	6	6
(France) Stéphane Simian	6	7	3
(Australia) Grant Doyle	7	1	6
32	(France) Gérard Solvès	5	6	3

Qualifying competition
2	(France) Jérôme Golmard	6	6	6
(Australia) Grant Doyle	7	4	4

=== Third qualifier ===
First round
3	(Sweden) Nicklas Kulti	6	2	6
(China) Pan Bing	0	6	3
(Belgium) Fabien Cousin	6	6
(United Kingdom) Ross Matheson	4	3
(United States) Richard Schmidt	2	4
(Australia) Allen Belobrajdic	6	6
(Australia) James Sekulov	2	0
29	(France) Thierry Champion	6	6

Second round
3	(Sweden) Nicklas Kulti	6	7
(Belgium) Fabien Cousin	4	6
(Australia) Allen Belobrajdic	2	6	0
29	(France) Thierry Champion	6	2	6

Qualifying competition
3	(Sweden) Nicklas Kulti	6	6
29	(France) Thierry Champion	4	2

=== Fourth qualifier ===
First round
4	(United Kingdom) Chris Wilkinson	4	4
(Nigeria) Sulieman Ladipo	6	6
(Japan) Hideki Kaneko	3	2
(United Kingdom) Danny Sapsford	6	6
(Australia) Mark Draper	2	3
(Sweden) Robert Eriksson	6	6
(Mexico) Oscar Ortiz	3	5
30	(France) Jean-Philippe Fleurian	6	7

Second round
(Nigeria) Sulieman Ladipo	4	6
(United Kingdom) Danny Sapsford	6	7
(Sweden) Robert Eriksson	4	2
30	(France) Jean-Philippe Fleurian	6	6

Qualifying competition
(United Kingdom) Danny Sapsford	4	5
30	(France) Jean-Philippe Fleurian	6	7

=== Fifth qualifier ===
First round
5	(Belgium) Dick Norman	7	6
(Argentina) Franco Squillari	6	3
WC	(United States) Martin Engel	2	2
(Mexico) Leonardo Lavalle	6	6
WC	(United States) David DiLucia	2	4
(Malaysia) Adam Malik	6	6
WC	(United States) Geoff Grant	7	6
27	(Italy) Laurence Tieleman	5	2

Second round
5	(Belgium) Dick Norman	6	6	3
(Mexico) Leonardo Lavalle	7	4	6
(Malaysia) Adam Malik	2	4
WC	(United States) Geoff Grant	6	6

Qualifying competition
(Mexico) Leonardo Lavalle	6	7
WC	(United States) Geoff Grant	3	5

=== Sixth qualifier ===
First round
6	(Australia) Jamie Morgan	4	4
(France) Maxime Huard	6	6
(Spain) Óscar Burrieza	7	6
(Romania) Gabriel Trifu	5	3
(United States) Bill Barber	4	3
(Zimbabwe) Wayne Black	6	6
(Australia) Peter Tramacchi	6	6	7
28	(United Kingdom) Miles Maclagan	7	4	5

Second round
(France) Maxime Huard	3	3
(Spain) Óscar Burrieza	6	6
(Zimbabwe) Wayne Black	7	6
(Australia) Peter Tramacchi	5	1

Qualifying competition
(Spain) Óscar Burrieza	1	0^{r}
(Zimbabwe) Wayne Black	6	1

=== Seventh qualifier ===
First round
7	(India) Leander Paes	6	6
(New Zealand) James Greenhalgh	2	4
WC	(United States) Christopher Pressley	5	6
WC	(United States) Jeff Salzenstein	7	7
(South Africa) Clinton Marsh	3	2
WC	(United States) Cecil Mamiit	6	6
(United States) Donald Johnson	4	3
25	(The Bahamas) Mark Knowles	6	6

Second round
7	(India) Leander Paes	6	6
WC	(United States) Jeff Salzenstein	3	4
WC	(United States) Cecil Mamiit	2	4
25	(The Bahamas) Mark Knowles	6	6

Qualifying competition
7	(India) Leander Paes	2	6	2
25	(The Bahamas) Mark Knowles	6	3	6

=== Eighth qualifier ===
First round
8	(Argentina) Marcelo Charpentier	6	6
(Netherlands) Fernon Wibier	1	2
(Sweden) Mårten Renström	2	6	1
(Mexico) Luis Herrera	6	2	6
(Netherlands) Rogier Wassen	4	7	6
WC	(United States) Jan-Michael Gambill	6	5	3
(India) Mahesh Bhupathi	6	6
26	(France) Lionel Barthez	2	1

Second round
8	(Argentina) Marcelo Charpentier	6	6	5
(Mexico) Luis Herrera	7	2	7
(Netherlands) Rogier Wassen	4	5
(India) Mahesh Bhupathi	6	7

Qualifying competition
(Mexico) Luis Herrera	6	1
(India) Mahesh Bhupathi	7	6

=== Ninth qualifier ===
First round
9	(Slovakia) Ján Krošlák	0	2
(Spain) Ignacio Truyol-Turrion	6	6
(Italy) Daniele Balducci	4	7	4
(Spain) Álex Calatrava	6	6	6
(Netherlands) Joost Winnink	6	6
(Italy) Davide Sanguinetti	2	1
(Italy) Massimo Calvelli	1	3
23	(Australia) Paul Kilderry	6	6

Second round
(Spain) Ignacio Truyol-Turrion	2	1
(Spain) Álex Calatrava	6	6
(Netherlands) Joost Winnink	6	3	6
23	(Australia) Paul Kilderry	3	6	2

Qualifying competition
(Spain) Álex Calatrava	6	5	0
(Netherlands) Joost Winnink	3	7	6

=== Tenth qualifier ===
First round
10	(United Kingdom) Mark Petchey	6	7
(Australia) Ashley Naumann	4	6
(Colombia) Mario Rincón	6	6
(Mexico) Ignacio Martínez	2	4
(United States) Stephen Herdoiza	6	6
(United States) Brett Dickinson	2	4
(Canada) Andrew Sznajder	2	6	7
24	(Ecuador) Luis Morejón	6	2	5

Second round
10	(United Kingdom) Mark Petchey	6	6
(Colombia) Mario Rincón	4	3
(United States) Stephen Herdoiza	6	3	6
(Canada) Andrew Sznajder	3	6	7

Qualifying competition
10	(United Kingdom) Mark Petchey	6	6
(Canada) Andrew Sznajder	3	0

=== Eleventh qualifier ===
First round
11	(France) Rodolphe Gilbert	6	6
Alt	(United States) Kip Brady	1	4
(Venezuela) Jimy Szymanski	2	4
(Italy) Mosé Navarra	6	6
(South Africa) Grant Stafford	6	6
(Brazil) Fabio Silberberg	2	1
(Peru) Alejandro Aramburu Acuna	7	3	3
22	(Canada) Daniel Nestor	6	6	6

Second round
11	(France) Rodolphe Gilbert	6	7
(Italy) Mosé Navarra	1	6
(South Africa) Grant Stafford	2	6	2
22	(Canada) Daniel Nestor	6	3	6

Qualifying competition
11	(France) Rodolphe Gilbert	4	0
22	(Canada) Daniel Nestor	6	6

=== Twelfth qualifier ===
First round
12	(Germany) Karsten Braasch	6	7
(Australia) Joshua Eagle	3	5
(United States) Glenn Weiner	5	6	2
(United States) Rob Givone	7	4	6
(Australia) James Holmes	7	3	6
(Australia) Andrew Painter	5	6	1
(United States) Kent Kinnear	2	5
21	(South Africa) David Nainkin	6	7

Second round
12	(Germany) Karsten Braasch	6	6
(United States) Rob Givone	2	3
(Australia) James Holmes	0	1
21	(South Africa) David Nainkin	6	6

Qualifying competition
12	(Germany) Karsten Braasch	6	4	7
21	(South Africa) David Nainkin	3	6	6

=== Thirteenth qualifier ===
First round
13	(United Kingdom) Tim Henman	6	6
(Austria) Alex Antonitsch	3	4
(Argentina) Federico Browne	6	2	6
(Netherlands) John van Lottum	2	6	3
(Sweden) Mikael Stadling	2	3
WC	(United States) Vincent Mackey	6	6
(Ivory Coast) Claude N'Goran	4	5
20	(United States) Robbie Weiss	6	7

Second round
13	(United Kingdom) Tim Henman	6	6
(Argentina) Federico Browne	3	4
WC	(United States) Vincent Mackey	1	4
20	(United States) Robbie Weiss	6	6

Qualifying competition
13	(United Kingdom) Tim Henman	6	7
20	(United States) Robbie Weiss	3	5

=== Fourteenth qualifier ===
First round
14	(Italy) Daniele Musa	4	4
(South Africa) David Adams	6	6
(United States) Wade McGuire	2	4
(South Africa) Neville Godwin	6	6
(United States) Ivan Baron	3	4
(United States) Steve Bryan	6	6
(South Africa) Marius Barnard	5	4
19	(Egypt) Tamer El-Sawy	7	6

Second round
(South Africa) David Adams	6	3
(South Africa) Neville Godwin	7	6
(United States) Steve Bryan	6	1	4
19	(Egypt) Tamer El-Sawy	1	6	6

Qualifying competition
(South Africa) Neville Godwin	6	6
19	(Egypt) Tamer El-Sawy	4	4

=== Fifteenth qualifier ===
First round
15	(Canada) Albert Chang	6	3	4
(Sweden) Ola Kristiansson	3	6	6
(The Bahamas) Roger Smith	6	6
(United Kingdom) Gary Henderson	1	1
(Colombia) Miguel Tobón	4	6	7
(Switzerland) Lorenzo Manta	6	2	5
WC	(United States) Mashiska Washington	1	4
17	(Morocco) Hicham Arazi	6	6

Second round
(Sweden) Ola Kristiansson	6	2	7
(The Bahamas) Roger Smith	3	6	6
(Colombia) Miguel Tobón	1	0
17	(Morocco) Hicham Arazi	6	6

Qualifying competition
(Sweden) Ola Kristiansson	3	3
17	(Morocco) Hicham Arazi	6	6

=== Sixteenth qualifier ===
First round
16	(France) Thierry Guardiola	6	6	6
(United States) Louis Gloria	7	4	4
(Israel) Gilad Bloom	4	4
(Israel) Eyal Erlich	6	6
(North Macedonia) Aleksandar Kitinov	5
(Austria) Gerald Mandl	2^{r}
(Australia) Neil Borwick	4	4
18	(Spain) Juan-Albert Viloca-Puig	6	6

Second round
16	(France) Thierry Guardiola	6	6
(Israel) Eyal Erlich	3	1
(North Macedonia) Aleksandar Kitinov	5	2
18	(Spain) Juan-Albert Viloca-Puig	7	6

Qualifying competition
16	(France) Thierry Guardiola	2	3
18	(Spain) Juan-Albert Viloca-Puig	6	6
