= 1995 US Open – Men's doubles qualifying =

Men's doubles qualifying
- 1995 US Open

Events
Singles	men	women		boys	girls
Doubles	men	women	mixed	boys	girls
WC Singles	men	women	quad
WC Doubles	men	women	quad
Legends	men	women	mixed

Qualification
Singles	men	women
Doubles	men	women
- US Open

The qualifying rounds for the 1995 US Open were played in late August 1995 at the USTA National Tennis Center in Flushing Meadows, New York City, United States.

This event marks the only participation of Marcelo Ríos (who eventually became world No. 1 in singles in 1998) at a doubles competition of any Grand Slam tournament. Ríos teamed up with Sjeng Schalken, losing in the final round against Roger Smith and Paul Wekesa. The pair would also win an ATP tournament in Amsterdam at the same year, which would be the only title of Ríos in his entire doubles career.

== Seeds ==
1. (United States) Shelby Cannon / (Australia) Michael Tebbutt (qualified)
2. (South Africa) Stefan Kruger / (South Africa) Christo van Rensburg (qualifying competition, lucky losers)
3. (Zimbabwe) Wayne Black / (Netherlands) Fernon Wibier (first round)
4. (Australia) Scott Draper / (Australia) Peter Tramacchi (qualified)
5. (New Zealand) James Greenhalgh / (Belgium) Dick Norman (qualifying competition)
6. (The Bahamas) Roger Smith / (Kenya) Paul Wekesa (qualified)
7. (Sweden) Ola Kristiansson / (Sweden) Mårten Renström (qualified)
8. (South Africa) Neville Godwin / (South Africa) Grant Stafford (first round)

== Qualifiers ==
1. (United States) Shelby Cannon / (Australia) Michael Tebbutt
2. (Sweden) Ola Kristiansson / (Sweden) Mårten Renström
3. (The Bahamas) Roger Smith / (Kenya) Paul Wekesa
4. (Australia) Scott Draper / (Australia) Peter Tramacchi

== Lucky losers ==
1. (South Africa) Stefan Kruger / (South Africa) Christo van Rensburg

== Qualifying draw ==
=== First qualifier ===
First round
1	(United States) Shelby Cannon (Australia) Michael Tebbutt	7	7
(United States) Ivan Baron (United States) Dan Kronauge	6	5
WC	(United States) Adam Peterson (United States) Jeff Salzenstein	6	3	6
8	(South Africa) Neville Godwin (South Africa) Grant Stafford	1	6	4

Qualifying competition
1	(United States) Shelby Cannon (Australia) Michael Tebbutt	6	6	6
WC	(United States) Adam Peterson (United States) Jeff Salzenstein	2	7	4

=== Second qualifier ===
First round
2	(South Africa) Stefan Kruger (South Africa) Christo van Rensburg	6	6
(Mexico) Jorge Lozano (Mexico) Óscar Ortiz	3	3
(Canada) Sébastien Leblanc (United States) Ari Nathan	7	3	2
7	(Sweden) Ola Kristiansson (Sweden) Mårten Renström	6	6	6

Qualifying competition
2	(South Africa) Stefan Kruger (South Africa) Christo van Rensburg	2	3
7	(Sweden) Ola Kristiansson (Sweden) Mårten Renström	6	6

=== Third qualifier ===
First round
3	(Zimbabwe) Wayne Black (Netherlands) Fernon Wibier	4	6
(Chile) Marcelo Ríos (Netherlands) Sjeng Schalken	6	7
WC	(United States) Cecil Mamiit (United States) Eric Taino	7	6	4
6	(The Bahamas) Roger Smith (Kenya) Paul Wekesa	6	7	6

Qualifying competition
(Chile) Marcelo Ríos (Netherlands) Sjeng Schalken	6	6
6	(The Bahamas) Roger Smith (Kenya) Paul Wekesa	7	7

=== Fourth qualifier ===
First round
4	(Australia) Scott Draper (Australia) Peter Tramacchi	7	7
(United States) Brett Dickinson (North Macedonia) Aleksandar Kitinov	5	6
WC	(United States) Steve Campbell (United States) Todd Nelson	6	2
5	(New Zealand) James Greenhalgh (Belgium) Dick Norman	7	6

Qualifying competition
4	(Australia) Scott Draper (Australia) Peter Tramacchi	6	6	7
5	(New Zealand) James Greenhalgh (Belgium) Dick Norman	2	7	6
