= 1995 US Open – Women's singles qualifying =

Women's singles qualifying
- 1995 US Open

Events
| Singles | men | women | | boys | girls |
| Doubles | men | women | mixed | boys | girls |
| WC Singles | men | women | quad |
| WC Doubles | men | women | quad |
| Legends | men | women | mixed |

Qualification
| Singles | men | women |
| Doubles | men | women |
- US Open

Players who neither had high enough rankings nor received wild cards to enter the main draw of the annual US Open Tennis Championships participated in a qualifying tournament held over several days before the event.

== Seeds ==
1. (Italy) Rita Grande (qualified)
2. (United States) Meilen Tu (qualifying competition)
3. (Finland) Nanne Dahlman (second round)
4. (Madagascar) Dally Randriantefy (qualified)
5. (Germany) Karin Kschwendt (qualified)
6. (China) Fang Li (qualified)
7. (Czech Republic) Petra Langrová (first round)
8. (France) Alexandra Fusai (first round)
9. (Slovenia) Tina Križan (first round)
10. (Spain) Gala León García (second round)
11. (Russia) Eugenia Maniokova (qualifying competition)
12. (Austria) Melanie Schnell (qualified)
13. (Slovakia) Denisa Krajčovičová (first round)
14. (Canada) Maureen Drake (first round)
15. (Germany) Claudia Porwik (second round)
16. (China) Yi Jing-Qian (first round)

== Qualifiers ==
1. (Italy) Rita Grande
2. (United States) Janet Lee
3. (Madagascar) Dally Randriantefy
4. (Germany) Karin Kschwendt
5. (Austria) Melanie Schnell
6. (Netherlands) Manon Bollegraf
7. (China) Fang Li
8. (Japan) Naoko Kijimuta

== Qualifying draw ==
Key

- Q = Qualifier
- WC = Wild card
- LL = Lucky loser
- Alt = Alternate
- ITF = ITF entry
- PR = Protected ranking
- SR = Special ranking
- SE = Special exempt
- JE = Junior exempt
- JR = Junior Accelerator Programme entrant
- CO = College Accelerator Programme entrant
- NG = Next Gen Accelerator Program entrant
- w/o = Walkover
- r = Retired
- d = Defaulted

=== First qualifier ===
First round
1 | (Italy) Rita Grande | 6 | 6
WC | (United States) Jeri Ingram | 0 | 3
WC | (United States) Anne Mall | 3 | 4
(Czech Republic) Lenka Němečková | 6 | 6
WC | (United States) Tara Snyder | 4 | 7 | 6
(Germany) Angela Kerek | 6 | 5 | 2
(Germany) Petra Winzenhöller | 3 | 2
15 | (Germany) Claudia Porwik | 6 | 6

Second round
1 | (Italy) Rita Grande | 6^{5} | 7^{8} | 7
(Czech Republic) Lenka Němečková | 7^{7} | 6^{6} | 5
WC | (United States) Tara Snyder | 4 | 6 | 6
15 | (Germany) Claudia Porwik | 6 | 2 | 2

Qualifying competition
1 | (Italy) Rita Grande | 6 | 6
WC | (United States) Tara Snyder | 3 | 4

=== Second qualifier ===
First round
14 | (Canada) Maureen Drake | 1 | 6 | 3
(United States) Janet Lee | 6 | 3 | 6
(Russia) Svetlana Komleva | 5 | 6 | 4
(Czech Republic) Ludmila Varmužová | 7 | 2 | 6
WC | (United States) Kristina Brandi | 3 | 6 | 1
(United States) Shannan McCarthy | 6 | 2 | 6
(Netherlands) Kim de Weille | 6 | 6
7 | (Czech Republic) Petra Langrová | 3 | 4

Second round
(United States) Janet Lee | 4 | 6 | 6
(Czech Republic) Ludmila Varmužová | 6 | 2 | 2
(United States) Shannan McCarthy | 3 | 6^{7}
(Netherlands) Kim de Weille | 6 | 7^{9}

Qualifying competition
(United States) Janet Lee | 6 | 6
(Netherlands) Kim de Weille | 1 | 0

=== Third qualifier ===
First round
4 | (Madagascar) Dally Randriantefy | 6 | 7
(Japan) Yuka Yoshida | 2 | 5
(United States) Elly Hakami | 1 | 5
(United States) Karin Miller | 6 | 7
(Spain) Ángeles Montolio | 3 | 2
(Australia) Annabel Ellwood | 6 | 6
WC | (United States) Eleni Rossides | 6 | 6
9 | (Slovenia) Tina Križan | 3 | 4

Second round
4 | (Madagascar) Dally Randriantefy | 6 | 6
(United States) Karin Miller | 1 | 2
(Australia) Annabel Ellwood | 6 | 7^{7}
WC | (United States) Eleni Rossides | 4 | 6^{4}

Qualifying competition
4 | (Madagascar) Dally Randriantefy | 6 | 7
(Australia) Annabel Ellwood | 3 | 5

=== Fourth qualifier ===
First round
11 | (Russia) Eugenia Maniokova | 6 | 6
(Czech Republic) Lenka Cenková | 1 | 1
(Germany) Andrea Glass | 2 | 7^{10} | 3
(Germany) Anca Barna | 6 | 6^{8} | 6
(Georgia (country)) Nino Louarsabishvili | 4 | 6 | 6
(Netherlands) Nicole Muns-Jagerman | 6 | 0 | 2
(Italy) Gloria Pizzichini | 2 | 2
5 | (Germany) Karin Kschwendt | 6 | 6

Second round
11 | (Russia) Eugenia Maniokova | 6 | 1 | 6
(Germany) Anca Barna | 2 | 6 | 3
(Georgia (country)) Nino Louarsabishvili | 4 | 1
5 | (Germany) Karin Kschwendt | 6 | 6

Qualifying competition
11 | (Russia) Eugenia Maniokova | 6^{5} | 1
5 | (Germany) Karin Kschwendt | 7^{7} | 6

=== Fifth qualifier ===
First round
8 | (France) Alexandra Fusai | 3 | 6 | 2
(Brazil) Luciana Tella | 6 | 1 | 6
(France) Caroline Dhenin | 4 | 7 | 7^{7}
(Italy) Francesca Lubiani | 6 | 5 | 6^{5}
(Canada) Rene Simpson | 6 | 3 | 6
(Germany) Sandra Wächtershäuser | 4 | 6 | 2
WC | (United States) Tina Samara | 6^{3} | 4
12 | (Austria) Melanie Schnell | 7^{7} | 6

Second round
(Brazil) Luciana Tella | 4 | 4
(France) Caroline Dhenin | 6 | 6
(Canada) Rene Simpson | 2 | 6 | 4
12 | (Austria) Melanie Schnell | 6 | 3 | 6

Qualifying competition
(France) Caroline Dhenin | 6 | 3 | 0
12 | (Austria) Melanie Schnell | 3 | 6 | 6

=== Sixth qualifier ===
First round
10 | (Spain) Gala León García | 6 | 6
WC | (United States) Mashona Washington | 1 | 1
(Italy) Gabriella Boschiero | 6 | 6^{4} | 7
(France) Noëlle van Lottum | 4 | 7^{7} | 6
(Australia) Kerry-Anne Guse | 4 | 2
(Netherlands) Manon Bollegraf | 6 | 6
(China) Chen Li-Ling | 1 | 6^{1}
3 | (Finland) Nanne Dahlman | 6 | 7^{7}

Second round
10 | (Spain) Gala León García | 6 | 3 | 1
(Italy) Gabriella Boschiero | 2 | 6 | 6
(Netherlands) Manon Bollegraf | 6 | 6
3 | (Finland) Nanne Dahlman | 2 | 2

Qualifying competition
(Italy) Gabriella Boschiero | 5 | 2
(Netherlands) Manon Bollegraf | 7 | 6

=== Seventh qualifier ===
First round
6 | (China) Fang Li | 2 | 7^{7} | 6
(Thailand) Tamarine Tanasugarn | 6 | 6^{2} | 0
(Italy) Federica Fortuni | 6 | 3 | 5
(Australia) Kristine Kunce | 2 | 6 | 7
(Canada) Sonya Jeyaseelan | 6 | 6
WC | (United States) Julie Steven | 2 | 2
(Hungary) Virág Csurgó | 6 | 6^{6} | 6
13 | (Slovakia) Denisa Krajčovičová | 2 | 7^{8} | 2

Second round
6 | (China) Fang Li | 3 | 7 | 6
(Australia) Kristine Kunce | 6 | 5 | 2
(Canada) Sonya Jeyaseelan | 6 | 3 | 4
(Hungary) Virág Csurgó | 3 | 6 | 6

Qualifying competition
6 | (China) Fang Li | 6 | 6
(Hungary) Virág Csurgó | 3 | 3

=== Eighth qualifier ===
First round
16 | (China) Yi Jing-Qian | 6 | 1 | 4
(Japan) Naoko Kijimuta | 2 | 6 | 6
(Japan) Hiromi Nagano | 6 | 6
(Australia) Siobhan Drake-Brockman | 4 | 4
(Netherlands) Caroline Vis | 7 | 3 | 6^{5}
(Argentina) Mercedes Paz | 5 | 6 | 7^{7}
WC | (United Kingdom) Clare Wood | 5 | 6
2 | (United States) Meilen Tu | 7 | 7

Second round
(Japan) Naoko Kijimuta | 6 | 6
(Japan) Hiromi Nagano | 1 | 3
(Argentina) Mercedes Paz | 7^{10} | 1 | 3
2 | (United States) Meilen Tu | 6^{8} | 6 | 6

Qualifying competition
(Japan) Naoko Kijimuta | 6 | 6
2 | (United States) Meilen Tu | 2 | 4
