= 1995 US Open – Women's doubles qualifying =

Women's doubles qualifying
- 1995 US Open

Events
Singles	men	women		boys	girls
Doubles	men	women	mixed	boys	girls
WC Singles	men	women	quad
WC Doubles	men	women	quad
Legends	men	women	mixed

Qualification
Singles	men	women
Doubles	men	women
- US Open

== Seeds ==
1. (Czech Republic) Petra Kučová / (Czech Republic) Lenka Němečková (first round)
2. (United Kingdom) Valda Lake / (Australia) Louise Pleming (qualified)
3. (Hungary) Virág Csurgó / (South Korea) Park Sung-hee (first round)
4. (United States) Shannan McCarthy / (United States) Julie Steven (qualified)
5. (Federal Republic of Yugoslavia) Tatjana Ječmenica / (Georgia (country)) Nino Louarsabishvili (first round)
6. (Germany) Angela Kerek / (Moldova) Svetlana Komleva (first round)
7. (France) Caroline Dhenin / (France) Lea Ghirardi-Rubbi (first round)
8. (Spain) Estefanía Bottini / (Spain) Gala León García (qualifying competition, lucky losers)

== Qualifiers ==
1. (Austria) Barbara Schett / (Austria) Melanie Schnell
2. (Chinese Taipei) Janet Lee / (United States) Lindsay Lee
3. (United States) Shannan McCarthy / (United States) Julie Steven
4. (United Kingdom) Valda Lake / (Australia) Louise Pleming

== Lucky losers ==
1. (Spain) Estefanía Bottini / (Spain) Gala León García

== Draw ==
=== First qualifier ===
First round
1	(Czech Republic) Petra Kučová (Czech Republic) Lenka Němečková	3	1
(Austria) Barbara Schett (Austria) Melanie Schnell	6	6
(Italy) Giulia Casoni (Spain) Ángeles Montolio	4	6	6
5	(Federal Republic of Yugoslavia) Tatjana Ječmenica (Georgia (country)) Nino Louarsabishvili	6	3	3

Qualifying competition
(Austria) Barbara Schett (Austria) Melanie Schnell	6	6
(Italy) Giulia Casoni (Spain) Ángeles Montolio	4	2

=== Second qualifier ===
First round
3	(Hungary) Virág Csurgó (South Korea) Park Sung-hee	3	5
(Canada) Sonya Jeyaseelan (France) Sarah Pitkowski	6	7
WC	(Chinese Taipei) Janet Lee (United States) Lindsay Lee	7^{7}	6
7	(France) Caroline Dhenin (France) Lea Ghirardi-Rubbi	6^{5}	4

Qualifying competition
(Canada) Sonya Jeyaseelan (France) Sarah Pitkowski	2	3
WC	(Chinese Taipei) Janet Lee (United States) Lindsay Lee	6	6

=== Third qualifier ===
First round
8	(Spain) Estefanía Bottini (Spain) Gala León García	6	6
(United States) Rachel Jensen (United States) Rebecca Jensen	2	2
WC	(United States) Kristina Brandi (United States) Tara Snyder	2	4
4	(United States) Shannan McCarthy (United States) Julie Steven	6	6

Qualifying competition
8	(Spain) Estefanía Bottini (Spain) Gala León García	3	4
4	(United States) Shannan McCarthy (United States) Julie Steven	6	6

=== Fourth qualifier ===
First round
6	(Germany) Angela Kerek (Moldova) Svetlana Komleva	0	3
WC	(United States) Anne Mall (United States) Annie Miller	6	6
(Germany) Silke Meier (Slovakia) Denisa Szabová	1	2
2	(United Kingdom) Valda Lake (Australia) Louise Pleming	6	6

Qualifying competition
WC	(United States) Anne Mall (United States) Annie Miller	6^{5}	6^{8}
2	(United Kingdom) Valda Lake (Australia) Louise Pleming	7^{7}	7^{10}
