= Brian MacPhie =

American tennis player

- Country (sports): United States
- Born: 11 May 1972 (age 53) San Jose, California, U.S.
- Height: 5 ft 11 in (1.80 m)
- Turned pro: 1993
- Plays: Left-handed
- Prize money: US$1,331,539

Singles
- Career record: 27–38
- Career titles: 0; 0 Challenger, 0 Futures
- Highest ranking: No. 128 (6 July 1998)

Grand Slam singles results
- Australian Open: 2R (1996)
- French Open: Q2 (1995)
- Wimbledon: 2R (1998)
- US Open: Q3 (1992)

Doubles
- Career record: 234–217
- Career titles: 7; 11 Challenger, 0 Futures
- Highest ranking: No. 22 (25 February 2002)

Grand Slam doubles results
- Australian Open: QF (2008)
- French Open: 3R (1995)
- Wimbledon: QF (1996, 1998)
- US Open: QF (1993, 2001)

Grand Slam mixed doubles results
- Australian Open: SF (1997)
- French Open: 1R (2002)
- Wimbledon: 3R (1995, 2002)
- US Open: SF (1995, 1999)

Team competitions
- Davis Cup: 7–12
- Last updated on: 9 April 2022.

Brian MacPhie (born May 11, 1972) is an American former professional tennis player.

Primarily a doubles specialist, he and Cary Lothringer won the 1989 Boys' Junior National Tennis Championship Boys' 18 doubles title against Steve Campbell and Rick Witsken. MacPhie won seven doubles titles in his pro career, achieving a ranking of world No. 22 in 2002. He played collegiately for the University of Southern California.

MacPhie is now coaching tennis to juniors and adults in Austin, Texas at Westwood County Club.

== Performance timelines ==
Key
| W | F | SF | QF | #R | RR | Q# | DNQ | A | NH |

(W) winner; (F) finalist; (SF) semifinalist; (QF) quarterfinalist; (#R) rounds 4, 3, 2, 1; (RR) round-robin stage; (Q#) qualification round; (DNQ) did not qualify; (A) absent; (NH) not held; (SR) strike rate (events won / competed); (W–L) win–loss record.

=== Singles ===
| Tournament | 1992 | 1993 | 1994 | 1995 | 1996 | 1997 | 1998 | 1999 | 2000 | SR | W–L | Win % |
|---|---|---|---|---|---|---|---|---|---|---|---|---|
Grand Slam tournaments
| Australian Open | A | A | 1R | 1R | 2R | Q2 | 1R | Q3 | Q1 | 0 / 4 | 1–4 | 20% |
| French Open | A | A | Q1 | Q2 | Q1 | Q1 | Q1 | Q1 | A | 0 / 0 | 0–0 | – |
| Wimbledon | A | Q1 | Q1 | Q1 | Q1 | Q2 | 2R | Q1 | A | 0 / 1 | 1–1 | 50% |
| US Open | Q2 | Q1 | Q1 | Q1 | Q2 | Q1 | Q2 | A | A | 0 / 0 | 0–0 | – |
| Win–loss | 0–0 | 0–0 | 0–1 | 0–1 | 1–1 | 0–0 | 1–2 | 0–0 | 0–0 | 0 / 5 | 2–5 | – |
ATP Tour Masters 1000
| Indian Wells | 1R | Q1 | Q2 | A | A | A | A | Q1 | A | 0 / 1 | 0–1 | 0% |
| Miami | A | A | Q2 | Q2 | Q2 | A | 2R | Q1 | A | 0 / 1 | 1–1 | 50% |
| Canada | A | A | A | Q1 | A | A | 1R | A | A | 0 / 1 | 0–1 | 0% |
| Win–loss | 0–1 | 0–0 | 0–0 | 0–0 | 0–0 | 0–0 | 1–2 | 0–0 | 0–0 | 0 / 3 | 1–3 | 25% |

=== Doubles ===
| Tournament | 1989 | 1990 | 1991 | 1992 | 1993 | 1994 | 1995 | 1996 | 1997 | 1998 | 1999 | 2000 | 2001 | 2002 | 2003 | 2004 | 2005 | SR | W–L | Win % |
|---|---|---|---|---|---|---|---|---|---|---|---|---|---|---|---|---|---|---|---|---|
Grand Slam tournaments
| Australian Open | A | A | A | A | A | 2R | 2R | 1R | 1R | QF | 1R | 1R | 2R | 2R | 2R | 1R | 2R | 0 / 12 | 9–12 | 43% |
| French Open | A | A | A | A | 3R | 1R | A | 1R | 1R | 1R | 1R | 1R | 3R | 2R | 2R | 2R | 1R | 0 / 12 | 7–12 | 37% |
| Wimbledon | A | A | A | A | 3R | 1R | 2R | QF | 2R | QF | 2R | 2R | 3R | 3R | 2R | 3R | 1R | 0 / 13 | 19–13 | 59% |
| US Open | 1R | A | A | 1R | QF | 2R | 1R | 2R | 2R | 2R | 3R | 2R | QF | 3R | 2R | 1R | A | 0 / 14 | 16–14 | 53% |
| Win–loss | 0–1 | 0–0 | 0–0 | 0–1 | 7–3 | 2–4 | 2–3 | 4–4 | 2–4 | 7–4 | 3–4 | 2–4 | 8–4 | 6–4 | 4–4 | 3–4 | 1–3 | 0 / 51 | 51–51 | 50% |
ATP Tour Masters 1000
| Indian Wells | A | A | A | 2R | A | A | Q2 | F | 1R | 2R | Q2 | 2R | SF | 1R | 2R | 1R | A | 0 / 9 | 11–9 | 55% |
| Miami | A | A | A | A | A | 2R | 2R | 2R | 1R | 1R | 1R | SF | SF | QF | 2R | 1R | A | 0 / 11 | 12–11 | 52% |
| Monte Carlo | A | A | A | A | A | A | A | A | A | A | A | 1R | 1R | 2R | A | A | A | 0 / 3 | 1–3 | 25% |
| Hamburg | A | A | A | A | A | A | A | A | A | A | A | 1R | SF | 1R | A | A | A | 0 / 3 | 3–3 | 50% |
| Rome | A | A | A | A | A | A | A | A | A | A | A | 1R | A | QF | 1R | A | A | 0 / 3 | 2–3 | 40% |
| Canada | A | A | A | A | A | A | F | A | A | 1R | A | A | 2R | 1R | A | A | A | 0 / 4 | 5–4 | 56% |
| Cincinnati | A | A | A | A | A | A | A | A | A | A | A | 1R | 1R | 1R | A | A | A | 0 / 3 | 0–3 | 0% |
| Paris | A | A | A | A | A | A | A | A | A | A | A | A | 2R | QF | A | A | A | 0 / 2 | 3–2 | 60% |
| Madrid | Not Held | | | | | | | | | | | | | QF | A | A | A | 0 / 1 | 2–1 | 67% |
| Stuttgart | A | A | A | A | A | A | A | A | A | A | A | A | 1R | A | A | A | A | 0 / 1 | 0–1 | 0% |
| Win–loss | 0–0 | 0–0 | 0–0 | 1–1 | 0–0 | 1–1 | 5–2 | 4–2 | 0–2 | 1–3 | 0–1 | 5–6 | 11–8 | 9–9 | 2–3 | 0–2 | 0–0 | 0 / 40 | 39–40 | 49% |

=== Mixed doubles ===
| Tournament | 1993 | 1994 | 1995 | 1996 | 1997 | 1998 | 1999 | 2000 | 2001 | 2002 | 2003 | 2004 | 2005 | SR | W–L | Win % |
|---|---|---|---|---|---|---|---|---|---|---|---|---|---|---|---|---|
Grand Slam tournaments
| Australian Open | A | A | A | A | SF | A | A | A | A | 1R | 1R | A | A | 0 / 3 | 3–3 | 50% |
| French Open | A | A | A | A | A | A | A | A | A | 1R | A | A | A | 0 / 1 | 0–1 | 0% |
| Wimbledon | A | 1R | 3R | 2R | A | 2R | 1R | 1R | 2R | 3R | 1R | A | 2R | 0 / 10 | 8–10 | 44% |
| US Open | 2R | A | SF | A | A | 2R | SF | 1R | 1R | 1R | 1R | A | A | 0 / 8 | 8–8 | 50% |
| Win–loss | 1–1 | 0–1 | 5–2 | 1–1 | 3–1 | 2–2 | 3–2 | 0–2 | 1–2 | 2–4 | 0–3 | 0–0 | 1–1 | 0 / 22 | 19–22 | 46% |

== ATP career finals ==
=== Doubles: 20 (7 titles, 13 runner-ups) ===
| Legend Grand Slam Tournaments (0–0) ATP World Tour Finals (0–0) ATP Masters Series (0–2) ATP Championship Series (2–1) ATP World Series (5–10) | Finals by surface Hard (7–7) Clay (0–4) Grass (0–2) Carpet (0–0) | Finals by setting Outdoors (4–12) Indoors (3–1) |

| Result | W–L | Date | Tournament | Tier | Surface | Partner | Opponents | Score |
|---|---|---|---|---|---|---|---|---|
| Loss | 0–1 | Apr 1994 | Birmingham, United States | World Series | Clay | (United States) David Witt | (United States) Richey Reneberg (South Africa) Christo van Rensburg | 6–2, 3–6, 2–6 |
| Loss | 0–2 | Aug 1994 | Los Angeles, United States | World Series | Hard | (United States) Scott Davis | (Australia) John Fitzgerald (Australia) Mark Woodforde | 6–4, 2–6, 0–6 |
| Loss | 0–3 | Jul 1995 | Montreal, Canada | Masters Series | Hard | (Australia) Sandon Stolle | (Russia) Yevgeny Kafelnikov (Russia) Andrei Olhovskiy | 2–6, 2–6 |
| Loss | 0–4 | Mar 1996 | Indian Wells, United States | Masters Series | Hard | (Australia) Michael Tebbutt | (Australia) Todd Woodbridge (Australia) Mark Woodforde | 6–1, 2–6, 2–6 |
| Win | 1–4 | Feb 1997 | San Jose, United States | International Series | Hard | (South Africa) Gary Muller | (The Bahamas) Mark Knowles (Canada) Daniel Nestor | 4–6, 7–6, 7–5 |
| Loss | 1–5 | Apr 1999 | Tokyo, Japan | Championship Series | Hard | (Zimbabwe) Wayne Black | (United States) Jeff Tarango (Czech Republic) Daniel Vacek | 3–4 ret. |
| Loss | 1–6 | May 1999 | Delray Beach, United States | World Series | Clay | (United States) Doug Flach | (Belarus) Max Mirnyi (Socialist Federal Republic of Yugoslavia) Nenad Zimonjić | 6–7, 6–3, 3–6 |
| Loss | 1–7 | Aug 1999 | Los Angeles, United States | World Series | Hard | (Croatia) Goran Ivanišević | (Zimbabwe) Byron Black (South Africa) Wayne Ferreira | 2–6, 6–7 |
| Win | 2–7 | Mar 2000 | Delray Beach, United States | International Series | Hard | (Serbia and Montenegro) Nenad Zimonjić | (Australia) Joshua Eagle (Australia) Andrew Florent | 7–5, 6–4 |
| Win | 3–7 | Feb 2001 | San Jose, United States | International Series | Hard | (The Bahamas) Mark Knowles | (United States) Jan-Michael Gambill (United States) Jonathan Stark | 6–3, 7–6 |
| Win | 4–7 | Aug 2001 | Indianapolis, United States | Championship Series | Hard | (The Bahamas) Mark Knowles | (India) Mahesh Bhupathi (Canada) Sébastien Lareau | 4–6, 7–6, 7–5 |
| Win | 5–7 | Feb 2002 | Memphis, United States | Championship Series | Hard | (Serbia and Montenegro) Nenad Zimonjić | (United States) Bob Bryan (United States) Mike Bryan | 6–3, 3–6, [10–4] |
| Loss | 5–8 | Jun 2002 | s'Hertogenbosch, Netherlands | International Series | Grass | (Netherlands) Paul Haarhuis | (Czech Republic) Martin Damm (Czech Republic) Cyril Suk | 6–7, 7–6, 4–6 |
| Loss | 5–9 | May 2003 | Valencia, Spain | International Series | Clay | (Serbia and Montenegro) Nenad Zimonjić | (Argentina) Lucas Arnold Ker (Argentina) Mariano Hood | 1–6, 7–6, 4–6 |
| Loss | 5–10 | Feb 2004 | San Jose, United States | International Series | Hard | (United States) Rick Leach | (United States) James Blake (United States) Mardy Fish | 2–6, 5–7 |
| Win | 6–10 | Mar 2004 | Scottsdale, United States | International Series | Hard | (United States) Rick Leach | (South Africa) Jeff Coetzee (South Africa) Chris Haggard | 6–3, 6–1 |
| Loss | 6–11 | Apr 2004 | Houston, United States | International Series | Clay | (United States) Rick Leach | (United States) James Blake (United States) Mardy Fish | 3–6, 4–6 |
| Loss | 6–12 | Jun 2004 | Nottingham, United Kingdom | International Series | Grass | (United States) Rick Leach | (Australia) Paul Hanley (Australia) Todd Woodbridge | 4–6, 3–6 |
| Loss | 6–13 | Feb 2004 | Shanghai, China | International Series | Hard | (United States) Rick Leach | (United States) Jared Palmer (Czech Republic) Pavel Vízner | 6–4, 6–7, 6–7 |
| Win | 7–13 | Jul 2005 | Los Angeles, United States | International Series | Hard | (United States) Rick Leach | (Israel) Jonathan Erlich (Israel) Andy Ram | 6–3, 6–4 |

== ATP Challenger and ITF Futures finals ==
=== Singles: 3 (0–3) ===
| Legend ATP Challenger (0–3) ITF Futures (0–0) | Finals by surface Hard (0–3) Clay (0–0) Grass (0–0) Carpet (0–0) |

| Result | W–L | Date | Tournament | Tier | Surface | Opponent | Score |
|---|---|---|---|---|---|---|---|
| Loss | 0-1 | Jul 1996 | Aptos, United States | Challenger | Hard | (Canada) Albert Chang | 5–7, 3–6 |
| Loss | 0-2 | Aug 1997 | Binghamton, United States | Challenger | Hard | (United States) David Witt | 2–6, 4–6 |
| Loss | 0-3 | Feb 1999 | Amarillo, United States | Challenger | Hard | (Romania) Gabriel Trifu | 7–5, 4–6, 2–6 |

=== Doubles: 14 (11–3) ===
| Legend ATP Challenger (11–3) ITF Futures (0–0) | Finals by surface Hard (11–3) Clay (0–0) Grass (0–0) Carpet (0–0) |

| Result | W–L | Date | Tournament | Tier | Surface | Partner | Opponents | Score |
|---|---|---|---|---|---|---|---|---|
| Loss | 0–1 | Jul 1991 | New Haven, United States | Challenger | Hard | (United States) Ivan Baron | (South Africa) Royce Deppe (United States) T.J. Middleton | 4–6, 7–5, 4–6 |
| Loss | 0–2 | Sep 1993 | Fairfield, United States | Challenger | Hard | (United States) Matt Lucena | (United States) Alex O'Brien (United States) Jared Palmer | 3–6, 5–7 |
| Win | 1–2 | Jul 1994 | Aptos, United States | Challenger | Hard | (United States) Alex O'Brien | (United States) Donny Isaak (United States) Michael Roberts | 6–2, 7–6 |
| Win | 2–2 | Jul 1994 | Winnetka, United States | Challenger | Hard | (United States) David Witt | (United States) Doug Flach (United States) Wade McGuire | 7–5, 6–2 |
| Win | 3–2 | Jul 1995 | Aptos, United States | Challenger | Hard | (Canada) Sebastien Leblanc | (United States) Bill Barber (United States) Ari Nathan | 6–3, 6–2 |
| Win | 4–2 | Jul 1995 | Granby, Canada | Challenger | Hard | (Australia) Sandon Stolle | (The Bahamas) Mark Knowles (Canada) Daniel Nestor | walkover |
| Win | 5–2 | Mar 1996 | Indian Wells, United States | Challenger | Hard | (United States) Brett Hansen-Dent | (Australia) Jason Stoltenberg (Australia) Peter Tramacchi | 6–3, 6–4 |
| Win | 6–2 | Oct 1996 | Tanagura, Japan | Challenger | Hard | (The Bahamas) Roger Smith | (Belarus) Max Mirnyi (Brazil) Jaime Oncins | 6–4, 6–4 |
| Win | 7–2 | Aug 1997 | Lexington, United States | Challenger | Hard | (Zimbabwe) Wayne Black | (United States) David Di Lucia (United States) Bryan Shelton | 6–4, 7–5 |
| Win | 8–2 | Aug 1997 | Binghamton, United States | Challenger | Hard | (United States) Jeff Salzenstein | (Portugal) Emanuel Couto (Egypt) Tamer El Sawy | 7–5, 6–7, 6–3 |
| Win | 9–2 | Dec 1997 | Burbank, United States | Challenger | Hard | (United States) Doug Flach | (Switzerland) George Bastl (Germany) Patrik Gottesleben | 7–6, 6–4 |
| Loss | 9–3 | Nov 1998 | Brest, France | Challenger | Hard | (United States) Justin Gimelstob | (South Africa) Neville Godwin (South Africa) Marcos Ondruska | 4–6, 7–5, 4–6 |
| Win | 10–3 | Feb 1999 | Laguna Hills, United States | Challenger | Hard | (United States) Paul Goldstein | (Argentina) Pablo Albano (Argentina) Daniel Orsanic | 3–6, 6–4, 7—5 |
| Win | 11–3 | Feb 2000 | Amarillo, United States | Challenger | Hard | (Australia) Michael Hill | (United States) Brandon Coupe (United States) Michael Sell | 7–5, 6–2 |
