= Joost Winnink =

Dutch tennis player (born 1971)

- Country (sports): Netherlands
- Born: 30 June 1971 (age 55) Peize, Netherlands
- Height: 1.80 m (5 ft 11 in)
- Plays: Right-handed
- Prize money: $242,379

Singles
- Career record: 8-15
- Career titles: 0
- Highest ranking: No. 152 (27 Nov 1995)

Grand Slam singles results
- US Open: 2R (1995)

Doubles
- Career record: 11-20
- Career titles: 0
- Highest ranking: No. 101 (10 Apr 1995)

Grand Slam doubles results
- Australian Open: 2R (1996)
- French Open: 1R (1995)
- Wimbledon: 1R (1995)
- US Open: 2R (1995)

Joost Winnink (born 30 June 1971) is a former professional tennis player from the Netherlands.

== Career ==
Winnink, and his partner Filip Dewulf, reached the semi-finals of the 1994 Monte Carlo Open, but his best result on the ATP Tour was when he finished runner-up at the 1995 South African Open, also in the doubles.

In 1994 at the "Melkhuisje" (in his home country) Winnink upset the gravel specialist Àlex Corretja in straight sets.

At the 1995 Eurocard Open, a Masters Series event, Winnink upset countryman and world number 21 Paul Haarhuis in straight sets, dropping just two games. He also reached the quarter-finals of the Czech Indoor tournament that year, en route defeating Javier Frana and David Prinosil, both top 100 players.

He competed in the singles draw of a Grand Slam just once. This was at the 1995 US Open where he reached the second round with a win over Greg Rusedski. With playing partner David Prinosil he demolished the then Davis Cup doubles team of Palmer/Reneburg in the first round. This was one of two occasions he made it past the first round.

== ATP Career Finals ==
=== Doubles: 1 (0–1) ===
Outcome	No.	Year	Tournament	Surface	Partner	Opponents in the final	Score in the final
Runner-up	1.	1995	Johannesburg, South Africa	Hard	(Germany) Martin Sinner	(France) Rodolphe Gilbert (France) Guillaume Raoux	4–6, 6–3, 3–6

== Challenger titles ==
=== Doubles: (7) ===
No.	Year	Tournament	Surface	Partner	Opponents in the final	Score in the final
1.	1993	Bochum, Germany	Clay	(Sweden) Marten Renström	(Australia) Jon Ireland (Australia) Andrew Kratzmann	6–3, 2–6, 7–5
2.	1994	Montauban, France	Clay	(Germany) Martin Sinner	(Italy) Nicola Bruno (Brazil) Otavio Della	7–5, 6–3
3.	1994	Reunion Island	Hard	(Netherlands) Hendrik Jan Davids	(Germany) Patrick Baur (Germany) Michael Geserer	6–1, 6–2
4.	1995	Wolfsburg, Germany	Carpet	(Germany) Martin Sinner	(Germany) Dirk Dier (Germany) Lars Koslowski	7–5, 6–3
5.	1996	Hamburen, Germany	Carpet	(United States) Jim Pugh	(Switzerland) Lorenzo Manta (Germany) Lars Rehmann	7–5, 7–5
6.	1996	Mauritius	Grass	(Germany) Patrick Baur	(Netherlands) Sander Groen (Romania) Andrei Pavel	0–1 RET
7.	1997	Lübeck, Germany	Carpet	(Germany) Mathias Huning	(United States) Trey Phillips (United Kingdom) Chris Wilkinson	7–6, 7–6
