= Ola Kristiansson =

Swedish tennis player

- Full name: Ola Kristiansson
- Country (sports): Sweden
- Born: 23 September 1971 (age 53); Helsingborg, Sweden
- Height: 6 ft 2 in (188 cm)
- Plays: Right-handed
- Prize money: $87,830

Singles
- Career record: 1–3
- Highest ranking: No. 277 (8 February 1993)

Doubles
- Career record: 5–12
- Highest ranking: No. 123 (12 June 1995)

Grand Slam doubles results
- Australian Open: 3R (1995)
- French Open: 1R (1995)
- Wimbledon: 1R (1995)
- US Open: 3R (1995)

Grand Slam mixed doubles results
- Wimbledon: 1R (1995)

Ola Kristiansson (born 23 September 1971) is a former professional tennis player from Sweden.

== Biography ==
A right-handed player from Helsingborg, Kristiansson was a Sweden Junior Davis Cup team representative and made three grand slam boys' doubles quarter-finals in 1989, with Nicklas Kulti.

Kristiansson, who turned professional in 1990, was most prominent on tour as a double player, with a best ranking of 123 in the world. In singles he had a career high ranking of 277 and reached the final round of qualifying in each of the four grand slam tournaments during his career. He won his only singles match on the ATP Tour at the Prague Open in 1994, over Bohdan Ulihrach.

In 1995 he competed in the main draw of the men's doubles at all grand slam events. At the Australian Open he made the round of 16 partnering Lars-Anders Wahlgren, which included a win against sixth seeds David Adams and Andrei Olhovskiy. He also paired up with Wahlgren for first round exits at the French Open and Wimbledon. With a new partner, Mårten Renström, Kristiansson reached the round of 16 at the US Open.

Since retiring in 1997 he has been a tennis coach. Previously the personal coach of Sofia Arvidsson and Johanna Larsson, he now coaches locally in Båstad.

== Challenger titles ==
=== Doubles: (3) ===
No.	Year	Tournament	Surface	Partner	Opponents	Score
1.	1994	Aachen, Germany	Carpet	(Sweden) David Engel	(Australia) Wayne Arthurs (Australia) Brent Larkham	6–4, 6–4
2.	1996	Dresden, Germany	Clay	(Sweden) Mårten Renström	(Latvia) Ģirts Dzelde (Sweden) Tomas Nydahl	3–6, 6–2, 7–5
3.	1996	Seville, Spain	Clay	(Belgium) Tom Vanhoudt	(Italy) Fabio Maggi (Spain) Juan Antonio Marín	6–0, 6–7, 6–1
