= Dick Norman =

Belgian tennis player

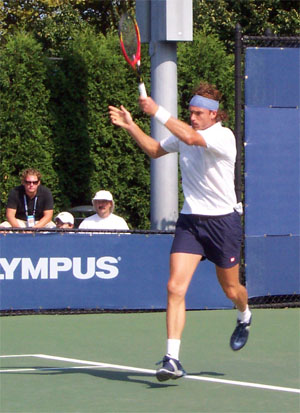
- Country (sports): Belgium
- Residence: Waregem, Belgium
- Born: 1 March 1971 (age 55) Waregem, Belgium
- Height: 2.03 m (6 ft 8 in)
- Turned pro: 1991
- Retired: 2013
- Plays: Left-handed (two-handed backhand)
- Prize money: $2,019,581

Singles
- Career record: 30–69
- Career titles: 0
- Highest ranking: No. 85 (6 November 2006)

Grand Slam singles results
- Australian Open: 2R (2006)
- French Open: 3R (1997)
- Wimbledon: 4R (1995)
- US Open: 2R (2002)

Doubles
- Career record: 119–121
- Career titles: 4
- Highest ranking: No. 10 (26 April 2010)

Grand Slam doubles results
- Australian Open: 2R (2006, 2013)
- French Open: F (2009)
- Wimbledon: SF (2009, 2010)
- US Open: QF (2009, 2010)

Other doubles tournaments
- Tour Finals: RR (2010)

Grand Slam mixed doubles results
- Australian Open: QF (2010, 2011)
- French Open: 2R (2011)
- Wimbledon: 3R (1995)
- US Open: 1R (2010)
- Last updated on: 10 April 2022.

Dick Norman (born 1 March 1971) is a Belgian former professional tennis player. He achieved a degree of folk popularity among tennis fans due to his height (6 feet 8 inches), his left-handed power game and, in the last few years of his career, his age (between late 2006 and his retirement in June 2013 he was the oldest player on the ATP Tour).

After retirement Norman became involved in coaching and organizing local tennis events. In March 2018, he became the tournament director of the European Open.

== Career ==
Turning professional in 1991, Norman notched up only his 14th Grand Slam appearance at the 2006 Wimbledon, where, at 35, he was the second oldest male competitor, to Andre Agassi. With Agassi's retirement immediately following the 2006 US Open, Norman succeeded him as the oldest active player on the ATP tour.

In 1995, he made it to the fourth round at Wimbledon, despite qualifying out of the lucky loser's draw. He defeated successive but aging former Wimbledon Champions Pat Cash and Stefan Edberg in the first and second rounds respectively, then doubles guru Todd Woodbridge in the third round, before falling to another former champion Boris Becker in the fourth round. At the time, it was the furthest that any player had ever advanced in a Grand Slam Tournament as a lucky loser.

He disappeared from the tennis scene after a few unimpressive seasons, but made a resurgence starting in 2003, at the age of 32, a common retirement age. He qualified for three of the four annual Grand Slam tournaments in 2003, 2005, and 2006. Nine of his 14 Grand Slam appearances have come after his 32nd birthday, although except for a surprise run in doubles at the French Open in 2009, none as successful as his 1995 Wimbledon run. He mostly lost in the first or second round. Still he has exceeded $1 million in career earnings, in large part due to his Grand Slam successes.

In November 2006, at the age of 35 years and eight months, Norman attained his career-high ATP singles ranking of world No. 85.

In July 2007, at Newport, Norman made it to his very first ATP semifinal, defeating eighth seed Michael Berrer along the way. His first round win was over fellow "giant", 6'9" wild card John Isner, who was playing in his first-ever ATP match.

As of February 2008, he remained the oldest active player on the ATP Tour at 36 years and 11 months; and although his ranking had dropped back to world No. 169, partly as a result of his having taken a break of several months from the tour over the preceding autumn and winter following the birth of his first child, he appeared to remain committed to continuing his career on the circuit.

While Norman was the oldest player on the tour, Jimmy Connors continued to compete regularly until the week of 10 May 1993, when he was 40 years and 8 months of age and played another six isolated tournaments over the three years to follow, the last of which took place in the week of 29 April 1996, when he was 43 years and 7 months old.

He has won over ten titles on the Challenger circuit, the most recent being at Mexico City in April 2009, at the age of 38. In January 2007, he teamed with countryman Xavier Malisse to win the doubles title at the ATP event in Chennai. In early 2009, he made the conscious decision to focus more on doubles than singles, and in February he joined forces with American James Cerretani to win the doubles title at the ATP World Tour event in Johannesburg.

In 2009, Norman teamed with South African Wesley Moodie and advanced to the final of the French Open. They lost 6–3, 3–6, 2–6 to the third seeded pair of Lukáš Dlouhý and Leander Paes. It is by far the furthest Norman has advanced in a Grand Slam tournament. It was the first time in his 19-year career that Norman had played doubles at the French Open, and only the third tournament in which Moodie (who with Stephen Huss won the Wimbledon doubles title in 2005) and Norman played together.

In the semifinals, Norman-Moodie saved three match points in a come-from-behind 0–6, 7–6, 6–4 victory over the defending champions, Bob and Mike Bryan, the second seeds. The Bryans had won the previous two Grand Slam titles, the 2008 US Open and the 2009 Australian Open. On their way to the final, Norman-Moodie had in the first round upset the seventh seed team of Max Mirnyi and Andy Ram.

In finishing runner-up for the 2009 French Open title, Norman earned 78,000 euros. The finish moved him to a career-high No. 32 in the ATP doubles rankings.

At 38 years and 3 months, Norman became the oldest male to reach a French Open final in the Open Era (since surpassed by Jean-Julien Rojer in winning the title at the 2022 French Open). He became the fifth player aged 38 or older to play in a men's doubles Grand Slam title match: Neale Fraser (39) was runner-up at Wimbledon in 1973, Ken Rosewall (38) lost the US Open final in 1973, Sherwood Stewart (38) won the Australian Open in 1984, and Bob Hewitt (38) won Wimbledon in 1978.

Two weeks later, he won the Ordina Open with his partner Wesley Moodie. It was his first grass-court title.

In November, he won the AXA Belgian Masters, as oldest man in the field.

In another career highlight, Dick (along with partner Moodie) qualified for the 2010 ATP World Tour Finals. This was the first time in his career that Dick qualified for the ATP World Tour Finals. Dick and Wesley entered the final tournament of the season, the 2010 BNP Paribas Masters, seeded eighth. Because Jürgen Melzer and Philipp Petzschner won 2010 Wimbledon, only the top seven ranked pairs qualified for the finals. Due to Dick and Wesley reaching the quarterfinals in Paris and František Čermák and Michal Mertiňák failing to reach the finals in Paris, Dick and Wesley were able to secure qualification.

Norman retired in June 2013, following a first-round defeat in the Rosmalen Grass Court Championships, having enjoyed a tennis career of 22 years.

== Grand Slam finals ==
=== Doubles: 1 runner-up ===
Result	Year	Championship	Surface	Partner	Opponents	Score
Loss	2009	French Open	Clay	(South Africa) Wesley Moodie	(Czech Republic) Lukáš Dlouhý (India) Leander Paes	6–3, 3–6, 2–6

== ATP career finals ==
=== Doubles: 7 (4 titles, 3 runner-ups) ===
Legend Grand Slam Tournaments (0–1) ATP World Tour Finals (0–0) ATP Masters 1000 Series (0–0) ATP 500 Series (0–0) ATP 250 Series (4–2)	Finals by surface Hard (3–0) Clay (0–2) Grass (1–0) Carpet (0–1)	Finals by setting Outdoors (3–2) Indoors (1–1)

Result	W–L	Date	Tournament	Tier	Surface	Partner	Opponents	Score
Loss	0–1	Oct 1995	Beijing, China	World Series	Carpet	(Netherlands) Fernon Wibier	(United States) Tommy Ho (Canada) Sébastien Lareau	6–7, 6–7
Win	1–1	Jan 2007	Chennai, India	International Series	Hard	(Belgium) Xavier Malisse	(Spain) Rafael Nadal (Spain) Tomeu Salvá	7–6^{(7–4)}, 7–6^{(7–4)}
Win	2–1	Feb 2009	Johannesburg, South Africa	250 Series	Hard	(United States) James Cerretani	(South Africa) Rik de Voest (Australia) Ashley Fisher	6–7^{(7–9)}, 6–2, [14–12]
Loss	2–2	Jun 2009	Paris, France	Grand Slam	Clay	(South Africa) Wesley Moodie	(Czech Republic) Lukáš Dlouhý (India) Leander Paes	6–3, 3–6, 2–6
Win	3–2	Jun 2009	's-Hertogenbosch, Netherlands	250 Series	Grass	(South Africa) Wesley Moodie	(Sweden) Johan Brunström (Netherlands Antilles) Jean-Julien Rojer	7–6^{(7–3)}, 6–7^{(8–10)}, [10–5]
Win	4–2	Feb 2011	Zagreb, Croatia	250 Series	Hard	(Romania) Horia Tecău	(Spain) Marcel Granollers (Spain) Marc López	6–3, 6–4
Loss	4–3	May 2012	Munich, Germany	250 Series	Clay	(Belgium) Xavier Malisse	(Czech Republic) František Čermák (Slovakia) Filip Polášek	4–6, 5–7

== ATP Challenger and ITF Futures finals ==
=== Singles: 30 (19–11) ===
Legend ATP Challenger (13–11) ITF Futures (6–0)	Finals by surface Hard (6–5) Clay (8–2) Grass (0–0) Carpet (5–4)

Result	W–L	Date	Tournament	Tier	Surface	Opponent	Score
Loss	0-1	Mar 1995	Garmisch, Germany	Challenger	Carpet	(Germany) Nicolas Kiefer	6–7, 6–7
Win	1-1	Jul 1995	Newcastle, United Kingdom	Challenger	Hard	(South Africa) David Nainkin	6–1, 6–4
Win	2-1	May 1997	Dresden, Germany	Challenger	Clay	(Spain) Julian Alonso	6–4, 6–4
Win	3-1	Nov 1997	Neumünster, Germany	Challenger	Carpet	(Netherlands) John Van Lottum	6–7, 7–6, 7–6
Win	4-1	Jun 2000	Poland F2, Zabrze	Futures	Clay	(Czech Republic) Jaroslav Levinský	6–3, 7–6^{(7–2)}
Win	5-1	Jul 2000	Poland F3, Katowice	Futures	Clay	(Finland) Kim Tiilikainen	6–1, 6–4
Win	6-1	Aug 2000	Luxembourg F1, Luxembourg	Futures	Clay	(Czech Republic) Petr Dezort	6–3, 7–6^{(7–4)}
Loss	6-2	Sep 2000	Brașov, Romania	Challenger	Clay	(Brazil) Alexandre Simoni	5–7, 3–6
Win	7-2	Oct 2000	France F19, Plaisir	Futures	Hard	(Russia) Andrei Chesnokov	6–3, 5–7, 6–4
Loss	7-3	Feb 2001	Lübeck, Germany	Challenger	Carpet	(Austria) Zbynek Mlynarik	6–7^{(6–8)}, 7–6^{(7–4)}, 4–6
Win	8-3	Mar 2001	France F6, Poitiers	Futures	Hard	(France) Gregory Carraz	6–3, 6–7^{(5–7)}, 6–4
Win	9-3	Apr 2001	France F7, Melun	Futures	Carpet	(France) Gregory Carraz	6–3, 6–2
Win	10-3	May 2001	Antwerp, Belgium	Challenger	Clay	(Netherlands) Peter Wessels	5–3 ret.
Loss	10-4	Feb 2002	Wolfsburg, Germany	Challenger	Carpet	(Germany) Jakub Herm-Zahlava	4–6, 2–6
Win	11-4	Mar 2002	Magdeburg, Germany	Challenger	Carpet	(Germany) Axel Pretzsch	7–6^{(8–6)}, 3–6, 6–4
Win	12-4	Mar 2002	San Luis Potosí, Mexico	Challenger	Clay	(France) Paul-Henri Mathieu	2–6, 6–2, 6–4
Win	13-4	Jun 2002	Andorra la Vella, Andorra	Challenger	Hard	(Croatia) Ivo Karlović	6–4, 6–4
Win	14-4	Oct 2002	Quito, Ecuador	Challenger	Clay	(Ecuador) Giovanni Lapentti	6–4, 6–3
Loss	14-5	Mar 2003	Sarajevo, Bosnia & Herzegovina	Challenger	Hard	(France) Richard Gasquet	1–6, 6–7^{(7–9)}
Win	15-5	Apr 2003	San Luis Potosí, Mexico	Challenger	Clay	(Argentina) Federico Browne	7–5, 0–6, 6–4
Loss	15-6	Nov 2003	Prague, Czech Republic	Challenger	Carpet	(Switzerland) Marc Rosset	6–7^{(4–7)}, 7–6^{(7–1)}, 6–7^{(3–7)}
Loss	15-7	Feb 2004	Andrezieux, France	Challenger	Hard	(France) Julien Benneteau	7–6^{(10–8)}, 6–7^{(5–7)}, 6–7^{(5–7)}
Win	16-7	Dec 2004	Ischgl, Austria	Challenger	Carpet	(Italy) Daniele Bracciali	6–1, 3–6, 6–1
Win	17-7	Feb 2005	Belgrade, Serbia	Challenger	Carpet	(Belgium) Jeroen Masson	6–2, 6–3
Loss	17-8	Mar 2005	San Luis Potosí, Mexico	Challenger	Clay	(Spain) Fernando Vicente	4–6, 4–6
Win	18-8	Nov 2005	Dnipropetrovsk, Ukraine	Challenger	Hard	(Netherlands) Raemon Sluiter	7–6^{(7–2)}, 6–7^{(2–7)}, 6–3
Loss	18-9	Apr 2006	León, Mexico	Challenger	Hard	(United States) Phillip Simmonds	6–3, 6–7^{(4–7)}, 2–6
Loss	18-10	Sep 2007	Donetsk, Ukraine	Challenger	Hard	(Croatia) Roko Karanušić	4–6, 4–6
Loss	18-11	Jul 2008	Córdoba, Spain	Challenger	Hard	(Spain) Iván Navarro	7–6^{(7–4)}, 3–6, 6–7^{(10–12)}
Win	19-11	Apr 2009	Mexico City, Mexico	Challenger	Hard	(Uruguay) Marcel Felder	6–4, 6–7^{(6–8)}, 7–5

=== Doubles: 26 (11–15) ===
Legend ATP Challenger (10–15) ITF Futures (1–0)	Finals by surface Hard (3–7) Clay (6–4) Grass (1–2) Carpet (1–2)

Result	W–L	Date	Tournament	Tier	Surface	Partner	Opponents	Score
Win	1–0	Aug 1992	Poznań, Poland	Challenger	Clay	(Poland) Tomasz Iwanski	(Chile) Sergio Cortés (Spain) Vicente Solves	4–6, 6–3, 6–2
Loss	1–1	May 1994	Jerusalem, Israel	Challenger	Hard	(Belgium) Filip Dewulf	(South Africa) Ellis Ferreira (South Africa) Kevin Ullyett	6–7, 3–6
Loss	1–2	Jul 1994	Bristol, United Kingdom	Challenger	Grass	(Italy) Massimo Bertolini	(Italy) Pietro Pennisi (Romania) Alexandru Radulescu	4–6, 5–7
Loss	1–3	Oct 1994	Ponte Vedra, United States	Challenger	Hard	(United Kingdom) Ross Matheson	(United States) Paul Annacone (United States) Kelly Jones	7–6, 4–6, 3—6
Loss	1–4	Nov 1994	Nantes, France	Challenger	Hard	(Canada) Greg Rusedski	(France) Olivier Delaître (France) Guillaume Raoux	4–6, 6–7
Win	2–4	Dec 1994	Adelaide, Australia	Challenger	Grass	(India) Mahesh Bhupathi	(Australia) Scott Draper (Australia) Peter Tramacchi	7–6, 7–6
Loss	2–5	Mar 1995	Garmisch, Germany	Challenger	Carpet	(Germany) Mathias Huning	(France) Lionel Barthez (Portugal) Nuno Marques	6–7, 6–7
Loss	2–6	Jul 1996	Manchester, United Kingdom	Challenger	Grass	(Netherlands) Fernon Wibier	(Belarus) Max Mirnyi (Israel) Lior Mor	5–7, 6–7
Win	3–6	Aug 2000	Luxembourg F1, Luxembourg	Futures	Clay	(Germany) Christopher Kas	(South Africa) Rik de Voest (South Africa) Willem-Petrus Meyer	6–1, 7–6^{(7–2)}
Loss	3–7	Sep 2000	Brașov, Romania	Challenger	Clay	(Austria) Wolfgang Schranz	(Romania) Ionuț Moldovan (Russia) Yuri Schukin	4–6, 1–6
Loss	3–8	Mar 2002	Magdeburg, Germany	Challenger	Carpet	(Netherlands) Djalmar Sistermans	(Germany) Franz Stauder (Ukraine) Orest Tereshchuk	4–6, 3–6
Win	4–8	Mar 2002	San Luis Potosí, Mexico	Challenger	Clay	(Bulgaria) Orlin Stanoytchev	(Argentina) Ignacio Hirigoyen (Argentina) Sebastián Prieto	walkover
Win	5–8	May 2002	Zagreb, Croatia	Challenger	Clay	(Belgium) Tom Vanhoudt	(Australia) Jordan Kerr (Australia) Grant Silcock	6–3, 4–6, 6–3
Win	6–8	Sep 2006	Orléans, France	Challenger	Hard	(France) Gregory Carraz	(France) Jérôme Haehnel (Monaco) Jean-Rene Lisnard	7–6^{(8–6)}, 6–1
Loss	6–9	Mar 2007	Cherbourg, France	Challenger	Hard	(Poland) Łukasz Kubot	(Slovakia) Michal Mertiňák (Czech Republic) Robin Vik	2–6, 4–6
Loss	6–10	Mar 2007	Bogotá, Colombia	Challenger	Clay	(Portugal) Fred Gil	(Argentina) Martin Garcia (Argentina) Diego Hartfield	4–6, 6–3, [5–10]
Loss	6–11	Aug 2007	Istanbul, Turkey	Challenger	Hard	(Belgium) Kristof Vliegen	(United Kingdom) James Auckland (United Kingdom) Ross Hutchins	7–5, 6–7^{(5–7)}, [7–10]
Loss	6–12	Mar 2008	Salinas, Ecuador	Challenger	Hard	(Argentina) Sebastián Decoud	(Brazil) Júlio Silva (Brazil) Caio Zampieri	6–7^{(6–8)}, 2–6
Loss	6–13	May 2008	Rijeka, Croatia	Challenger	Clay	(United States) Alex Kuznetsov	(Czech Republic) Dušan Karol (Czech Republic) Jaroslav Pospíšil	4–6, 4–6
Loss	6–14	Jul 2008	Córdoba, Spain	Challenger	Hard	(United States) James Cerretani	(Sweden) Johan Brunström (Netherlands Antilles) Jean-Julien Rojer	4–6, 3–6
Win	7–14	Aug 2008	Freudenstadt, Germany	Challenger	Clay	(Belgium) Kristof Vliegen	(Austria) Rainer Eitzinger (Austria) Armin Sandbichler	6–3, 6–3
Win	8–14	Sep 2008	Donetsk, Ukraine	Challenger	Hard	(Belgium) Xavier Malisse	(Israel) Harel Levy (Israel) Noam Okun	4–6, 6–1, [13—11]
Loss	8–15	Sep 2008	Grenoble, France	Challenger	Hard	(Belgium) Niels Desein	(Austria) Martin Fischer (Austria) Philipp Oswald	7–6^{(7–5)}, 5–7, [7–10]
Win	9–15	Oct 2008	Rennes, France	Challenger	Carpet	(United Kingdom) James Auckland	(Switzerland) Yves Allegro (Romania) Horia Tecău	6–3, 6–4
Win	10–15	Apr 2012	Barletta, Italy	Challenger	Clay	(Sweden) Johan Brunström	(United Kingdom) Jonathan Marray (Slovakia) Igor Zelenay	6–4, 7–5
Win	11–15	Sep 2012	Pétange, Luxembourg	Challenger	Hard	(Germany) Christopher Kas	(United Kingdom) Jamie Murray (Brazil) André Sá	2–6, 6–2, [10—8]

== Performance timelines ==
Key
W	F	SF	QF	#R	RR	Q#	DNQ	A	NH

(W) winner; (F) finalist; (SF) semifinalist; (QF) quarterfinalist; (#R) rounds 4, 3, 2, 1; (RR) round-robin stage; (Q#) qualification round; (DNQ) did not qualify; (A) absent; (NH) not held; (SR) strike rate (events won / competed); (W–L) win–loss record.

=== Singles ===
Tournament	1994	1995	1996	1997	1998	1999	2000	2001	2002	2003	2004	2005	2006	2007	2008	2009	2010	SR	W–L	Win %
Grand Slam tournaments
Australian Open	A	A	1R	A	Q1	A	A	Q1	Q3	1R	A	A	2R	A	A	A	A	0 / 3	1–3	25%
French Open	A	A	1R	3R	Q1	A	A	Q2	Q2	1R	Q2	2R	2R	Q1	Q1	Q1	A	0 / 5	4–5	44%
Wimbledon	A	4R	Q2	Q2	Q1	A	A	Q1	Q1	1R	Q1	1R	1R	A	Q1	A	A	0 / 4	3–4	43%
US Open	A	Q2	A	Q3	A	A	A	A	2R	Q1	Q1	1R	Q1	Q1	A	A	A	0 / 2	1–2	33%
Win–loss	0–0	3–1	0–2	2–1	0–0	0–0	0–0	0–0	1–1	0–3	0–0	1–3	2–3	0–0	0–0	0–0	0–0	0 / 14	9–14	39%
ATP World Tour Masters 1000
Indian Wells Masters	A	A	A	A	A	A	A	A	A	A	A	A	A	A	A	A	Q1	0 / 0	0–0	–
Miami Masters	A	A	A	A	1R	A	A	A	Q1	A	A	Q1	A	Q1	A	A	A	0 / 1	0–1	0%
Rome Masters	A	A	A	A	A	A	A	A	A	A	A	A	Q2	A	A	A	A	0 / 0	0–0	–
Canada Masters	A	A	A	A	A	A	A	A	A	A	Q1	A	A	A	A	A	A	0 / 0	0–0	–
Cincinnati Masters	A	A	A	A	A	A	A	A	A	A	1R	A	A	A	A	A	A	0 / 1	0–1	0%
Stuttgart Masters	A	Q1	A	A	A	A	A	A	Not Held									0 / 0	0–0	–
Paris Masters	Q2	A	A	A	A	A	A	A	A	A	A	A	A	A	A	A	A	0 / 0	0–0	–
Shanghai Masters	Not Masters Series															Q2	A	0 / 0	0–0	–
Win–loss	0–0	0–0	0–0	0–0	0–1	0–0	0–0	0–0	0–0	0–0	0–1	0–0	0–0	0–0	0–0	0–0	0–0	0 / 2	0–2	0%

=== Doubles ===
Tournament	1995	1996	1997	1998	1999	2000	2001	2002	2003	2004	2005	2006	2007	2008	2009	2010	2011	2012	2013	SR	W–L	Win %
Grand Slam tournaments
Australian Open	A	1R	A	A	A	A	A	A	A	A	A	2R	A	A	A	1R	1R	1R	2R	0 / 6	2–6	25%
French Open	A	A	A	A	A	A	A	A	A	A	A	A	A	A	F	SF	1R	1R	A	0 / 4	9–4	69%
Wimbledon	1R	Q1	Q3	A	A	A	A	A	A	A	A	A	1R	2R	SF	SF	3R	1R	A	0 / 7	11–7	61%
US Open	Q2	A	A	A	A	A	A	A	A	A	A	A	A	A	QF	QF	3R	1R	A	0 / 4	8–4	67%
Win–loss	0–1	0–1	0–0	0–0	0–0	0–0	0–0	0–0	0–0	0–0	0–0	1–1	0–1	1–1	12–3	11–4	4–4	0–4	1–1	0 / 21	30–21	59%
ATP World Tour Masters 1000
Indian Wells Masters	A	A	A	A	A	A	A	A	A	A	A	A	A	A	A	1R	A	A	A	0 / 1	0–1	0%
Miami Masters	A	A	A	A	A	A	A	A	A	A	A	A	A	A	A	1R	1R	A	A	0 / 2	1–2	33%
Monte Carlo Masters	A	A	A	A	A	A	A	A	A	A	A	A	A	A	A	SF	1R	A	A	0 / 2	2–2	50%
Rome Masters	A	A	A	A	A	A	A	A	A	A	A	A	A	A	A	2R	2R	A	A	0 / 2	0–2	0%
Madrid	Not Held							A	A	A	A	A	A	A	A	2R	QF	A	A	0 / 2	1–2	33%
Canada Masters	A	A	A	A	A	A	A	A	A	A	A	A	A	A	QF	2R	1R	A	A	0 / 3	1–3	25%
Cincinnati Masters	A	A	A	A	A	A	A	A	A	A	A	A	A	A	QF	SF	1R	A	A	0 / 3	4–3	57%
Paris Masters	A	A	A	A	A	A	A	A	A	A	A	A	A	A	2R	QF	1R	A	A	0 / 3	2–3	40%
Shanghai Masters	Not Masters Series														QF	2R	A	A	A	0 / 2	1–2	33%
Win–loss	0–0	0–0	0–0	0–0	0–0	0–0	0–0	0–0	0–0	0–0	0–0	0–0	0–0	0–0	3–4	7–9	2–7	0–0	0–0	0 / 20	12–20	38%

=== Mixed doubles ===
Tournament	1995	1996–2008	2009	2010	2011	2012	SR	W–L	Win %
Grand Slam tournaments
Australian Open	A	A	A	QF	QF	A	0 / 2	4–2	67%
French Open	A	A	A	1R	2R	A	0 / 2	1–2	33%
Wimbledon	3R	A	1R	1R	2R	1R	0 / 5	2–5	29%
US Open	A	A	A	1R	A	A	0 / 1	0–1	0%
Win–loss	2–1	0–0	0–1	2–4	3–3	0–1	0 / 10	7–10	41%
