= 1995 US Open – Men's doubles =

Men's doubles
- 1995 US Open

Final
- Champions: (Australia) Todd Woodbridge (Australia) Mark Woodforde
- Runners-up: (United States) Alex O'Brien (Australia) Sandon Stolle
- Score: 6–3, 6–3

Details
- Draw: 64
- Seeds: 16

Events
Singles	men	women		boys	girls
Doubles	men	women	mixed	boys	girls
WC Singles	men	women	quad
WC Doubles	men	women	quad
Legends	men	women	mixed
- US Open

The 1995 US Open was a tennis tournament played on outdoor hard courts at the USTA National Tennis Center in New York City in New York in the United States. It was the 115th edition of the US Open and was held from August 28 to September 10, 1995.

This marked the first Grand Slam main draw appearance for Bob and Mike Bryan, who would go on to win 16 Grand Slam titles together, including five US Open titles in 2005, 2008, 2010, 2012, and 2014.

== Seeds ==
Champion seeds are indicated in bold text while text in italics indicates the round in which those seeds were eliminated.

1. (Netherlands) Jacco Eltingh / (Netherlands) Paul Haarhuis (third round)
2. (Australia) **Todd Woodbridge** / (Australia) **Mark Woodforde (champions)**
3. (Russia) Yevgeny Kafelnikov / (Russia) Andrei Olhovskiy (second round)
4. (Canada) Grant Connell / (United States) Patrick Galbraith (semifinals)
5. (The Bahamas) Mark Knowles / (Canada) Daniel Nestor (quarterfinals)
6. (Zimbabwe) Byron Black / (United States) Jonathan Stark (quarterfinals)
7. (United States) Jared Palmer / (United States) Richey Reneberg (first round)
8. (Czech Republic) Cyril Suk / (Czech Republic) Daniel Vacek (second round)
9. (United States) Jim Grabb / (United States) Patrick McEnroe (first round)
10. (United States) Rick Leach / (United States) Scott Melville (quarterfinals)
11. (Argentina) Luis Lobo / (Spain) Javier Sánchez (first round)
12. (Czech Republic) Petr Korda / (Sweden) Nicklas Kulti (third round)
13. (United States) Trevor Kronemann / (Australia) David Macpherson (second round)
14. (South Africa) Lan Bale / (South Africa) John-Laffnie de Jager (first round)
15. (United States) Alex O'Brien / (Australia) Sandon Stolle (final)
16. (Australia) Mark Philippoussis / (Australia) Patrick Rafter (third round)

== Draw ==
Key

- Q = Qualifier
- WC = Wild card
- LL = Lucky loser
- Alt = Alternate
- ITF = ITF entry
- PR = Protected ranking
- SR = Special ranking
- SE = Special exempt
- JE = Junior exempt
- JR = Junior Accelerator Programme entrant
- CO = College Accelerator Programme entrant
- NG = Next Gen Accelerator Program entrant
- w/o = Walkover
- r = Retired
- d = Defaulted

=== Finals ===
Quarterfinals
15	(United States) Alex O'Brien (Australia) Sandon Stolle	7	6
(United States) Ken Flach (United States) Kelly Jones	5	4
(Spain) Sergio Casal (Spain) Emilio Sánchez	4	7	6
5	(The Bahamas) Mark Knowles (Canada) Daniel Nestor	6	6	4
6	(Zimbabwe) Byron Black (United States) Jonathan Stark	3	6	6
4	(Canada) Grant Connell (United States) Patrick Galbraith	6	3	7
10	(United States) Rick Leach (United States) Scott Melville	2	4
2	(Australia) Todd Woodbridge (Australia) Mark Woodforde	6	6

Semifinals
15	(United States) Alex O'Brien (Australia) Sandon Stolle	6	6
(Spain) Sergio Casal (Spain) Emilio Sánchez	2	4
4	(Canada) Grant Connell (United States) Patrick Galbraith	0	2
2	(Australia) Todd Woodbridge (Australia) Mark Woodforde	6	6

Final
15	(United States) Alex O'Brien (Australia) Sandon Stolle	3	3
2	(Australia) Todd Woodbridge (Australia) Mark Woodforde	6	6

=== Top half ===
==== Section 1 ====
First round
1	(Netherlands) J Eltingh (Netherlands) P Haarhuis	6	7
(Portugal) E Couto (Portugal) N Marques	3	5
(Czech Republic) J Novák (Czech Republic) D Rikl	6	7
(France) O Delaître (Switzerland) M Rosset	2	6
(Czech Republic) M Damm (Czech Republic) K Nováček	6	2	7
(United States) M Bauer (Netherlands) S Noteboom	4	6	6
15	(United States) A O'Brien (Australia) S Stolle	6	6
(Australia) W Arthurs (Australia) A Kratzmann	3	2
(United States) D Johnson (United States) K Thorne	2	7	6
9	(United States) J Grabb (United States) P McEnroe	6	6	3
(United States) K Flach (United States) K Jones	6	7
(United States) J Gimelstob (United States) S Humphries	3	6
(France) R Gilbert (France) G Raoux	6	3	6
(Australia) S Draper (Australia) P Tramacchi	4	6	3
8	(Czech Republic) C Suk (Czech Republic) D Vacek	7	4	7
(Sweden) J Björkman (Sweden) S Edberg	6	6	5

Second round
1	(Netherlands) J Eltingh (Netherlands) P Haarhuis	6	6
(Czech Republic) J Novák (Czech Republic) D Rikl	3	4
(Czech Republic) M Damm (Czech Republic) K Nováček	6	7	1
15	(United States) A O'Brien (Australia) S Stolle	7	6	6
(United States) D Johnson (United States) K Thorne	6	3	6
(United States) K Flach (United States) K Jones	1	6	7
(France) R Gilbert (France) G Raoux	3	6	6
8	(Czech Republic) C Suk (Czech Republic) D Vacek	6	3	4

Third round
1	(Netherlands) J Eltingh (Netherlands) P Haarhuis	4	7	3
15	(United States) A O'Brien (Australia) S Stolle	6	6	6
(United States) K Flach (United States) K Jones	7	7
(France) R Gilbert (France) G Raoux	6	5

Quarterfinals
15	(United States) A O'Brien (Australia) S Stolle	7	6
(United States) K Flach (United States) K Jones	5	4

==== Section 2 ====
First round
3	(Russia) Y Kafelnikov (Russia) A Olhovskiy	6	6	7
(South Africa) G Muller (South Africa) D Visser	4	7	5
(Spain) S Casal (Spain) E Sánchez	6	7
(South Africa) D Adams (South Africa) E Ferreira	4	6
(Austria) A Antonitsch (Netherlands) T Nijssen	6	6
(India) L Paes (Venezuela) N Pereira	1	2
(Australia) J Fitzgerald (Sweden) A Järryd	7	6
14	(South Africa) L Bale (South Africa) J-L de Jager	6	4
12	(Czech Republic) P Korda (Sweden) N Kulti	6	7
(Mexico) L Lavalle (Italy) D Nargiso	3	5
(Argentina) P Albano (Spain) J-A Conde	7	6
(United States) B MacPhie (United States) D Pate	6	4
(Belgium) L Pimek (South Africa) B Talbot	6	6
(United States) M Lucena (Australia) J Morgan	2	4
5	(The Bahamas) M Knowles (Canada) D Nestor	7	6
(Czech Republic) V Flégl (Australia) J Ireland	6	4

Second round
3	(Russia) Y Kafelnikov (Russia) A Olhovskiy	4	4
(Spain) S Casal (Spain) E Sánchez	6	6
(Austria) A Antonitsch (Netherlands) T Nijssen	3	2
(Australia) J Fitzgerald (Sweden) A Järryd	6	6
12	(Czech Republic) P Korda (Sweden) N Kulti	3	0
(Argentina) P Albano (Spain) J-A Conde	1	0^{r}
(Belgium) L Pimek (South Africa) B Talbot	3	2
5	(The Bahamas) M Knowles (Canada) D Nestor	6	6

Third round
(Spain) S Casal (Spain) E Sánchez	6	7
(Australia) J Fitzgerald (Sweden) A Järryd	4	6
12	(Czech Republic) P Korda (Sweden) N Kulti	4	6
5	(The Bahamas) M Knowles (Canada) D Nestor	6	7

Quarterfinals
(Spain) S Casal (Spain) E Sánchez	4	7	6
5	(The Bahamas) M Knowles (Canada) D Nestor	6	6	4

=== Bottom half ===
==== Section 3 ====
First round
6	(Zimbabwe) B Black (United States) J Stark	6	6
(United Kingdom) N Broad (South Africa) P Norval	4	2
(India) M Bhupathi (Lebanon) A Hamadeh	7	6
(United States) M Keil (Sweden) P Nyborg	6	1
(United States) L Jensen (United States) M Jensen	6	3	6
(The Bahamas) M Merklein (United States) C Woodruff	3	6	3
(Australia) P Kilderry (United States) K Kinnear	7	6
11	(Argentina) L Lobo (Spain) J Sánchez	5	4
13	(United States) T Kronemann (Australia) D Macpherson	7	2	6
(United States) M Joyce (United States) B Shelton	6	6	2
(Sweden) O Kristiansson (Sweden) M Renström	6	3	6
(Sweden) R Bergh (United States) J Waite	3	6	3
(United States) B Hansen-Dent (United States) J Leach	6	4	7
(Netherlands) R Krajicek (Netherlands) J Siemerink	4	6	5
4	(Canada) G Connell (United States) P Galbraith	6	6
(United States) B Bryan (United States) M Bryan	0	4

Second round
6	(Zimbabwe) B Black (United States) J Stark	6	6
(India) M Bhupathi (Lebanon) A Hamadeh	1	1
(United States) L Jensen (United States) M Jensen	6	6	6
(Australia) P Kilderry (United States) K Kinnear	2	7	2
13	(United States) T Kronemann (Australia) D Macpherson	3	3
(Sweden) O Kristiansson (Sweden) M Renström	6	6
(United States) B Hansen-Dent (United States) J Leach	3	4
4	(Canada) G Connell (United States) P Galbraith	6	6

Third round
6	(Zimbabwe) B Black (United States) J Stark	6	6
(United States) L Jensen (United States) M Jensen	3	3
(Sweden) O Kristiansson (Sweden) M Renström	5	3
4	(Canada) G Connell (United States) P Galbraith	7	6

Quarterfinals
6	(Zimbabwe) B Black (United States) J Stark	3	6	6
4	(Canada) G Connell (United States) P Galbraith	6	3	7

==== Section 4 ====
First round
(Germany) D Prinosil (Netherlands) J Winnink	6	6
7	(United States) J Palmer (United States) R Reneberg	2	4
(United States) S Cannon (Australia) M Tebbutt	7	6
(Australia) J Eagle (Australia) A Florent	5	3
(Netherlands) T Kempers (Netherlands) M Oosting	3	6	7
(United States) F Montana (United States) G Van Emburgh	6	2	5
10	(United States) R Leach (United States) S Melville	6	7
(Italy) C Brandi (South Africa) M Ondruska	2	6
16	(Australia) M Philippoussis (Australia) P Rafter	6	6
(South Africa) S Kruger (South Africa) C van Rensburg	3	4
(South Africa) M Barnard (United States) D Randall	6	7
(United States) D DiLucia (United States) D Flach	3	5
(Switzerland) J Hlasek (United States) D Wheaton	6	6
(Canada) S Lareau (United States) J Tarango	3	3
2	(Australia) T Woodbridge (Australia) M Woodforde	6	7
(United States) S Davis (United States) T Martin	2	6

Second round
(Germany) D Prinosil (Netherlands) J Winnink	1	5
(United States) S Cannon (Australia) M Tebbutt	6	7
(Netherlands) T Kempers (Netherlands) M Oosting	6	4
10	(United States) R Leach (United States) S Melville	7	6
16	(Australia) M Philippoussis (Australia) P Rafter	6	6
(South Africa) M Barnard (United States) D Randall	4	2
(Switzerland) J Hlasek (United States) D Wheaton	3	6
2	(Australia) T Woodbridge (Australia) M Woodforde	6	7

Third round
(United States) S Cannon (Australia) M Tebbutt	2	2
10	(United States) R Leach (United States) S Melville	6	6
16	(Australia) M Philippoussis (Australia) P Rafter	3	6	3
2	(Australia) T Woodbridge (Australia) M Woodforde	6	1	6

Quarterfinals
10	(United States) R Leach (United States) S Melville	2	4
2	(Australia) T Woodbridge (Australia) M Woodforde	6	6

== Qualifying ==
The qualifying rounds for the 1995 US Open were played in late August 1995 at the USTA National Tennis Center in Flushing Meadows, New York City, United States.

This event marks the only participation of Marcelo Ríos (who eventually became world No. 1 in singles in 1998) at a doubles competition of any Grand Slam tournament. Ríos teamed up with Sjeng Schalken, losing in the final round against Roger Smith and Paul Wekesa. The pair would also win an ATP tournament in Amsterdam at the same year, which would be the only title of Ríos in his entire doubles career.

=== Seeds ===
1. (United States) Shelby Cannon / (Australia) Michael Tebbutt (qualified)
2. (South Africa) Stefan Kruger / (South Africa) Christo van Rensburg (qualifying competition, lucky losers)
3. (Zimbabwe) Wayne Black / (Netherlands) Fernon Wibier (first round)
4. (Australia) Scott Draper / (Australia) Peter Tramacchi (qualified)
5. (New Zealand) James Greenhalgh / (Belgium) Dick Norman (qualifying competition)
6. (The Bahamas) Roger Smith / (Kenya) Paul Wekesa (qualified)
7. (Sweden) Ola Kristiansson / (Sweden) Mårten Renström (qualified)
8. (South Africa) Neville Godwin / (South Africa) Grant Stafford (first round)

=== Qualifiers ===
1. (United States) Shelby Cannon / (Australia) Michael Tebbutt
2. (Sweden) Ola Kristiansson / (Sweden) Mårten Renström
3. (The Bahamas) Roger Smith / (Kenya) Paul Wekesa
4. (Australia) Scott Draper / (Australia) Peter Tramacchi

=== Lucky losers ===
1. (South Africa) Stefan Kruger / (South Africa) Christo van Rensburg

=== Qualifying draw ===
==== First qualifier ====
First round
1	(United States) Shelby Cannon (Australia) Michael Tebbutt	7	7
(United States) Ivan Baron (United States) Dan Kronauge	6	5
WC	(United States) Adam Peterson (United States) Jeff Salzenstein	6	3	6
8	(South Africa) Neville Godwin (South Africa) Grant Stafford	1	6	4

Qualifying competition
1	(United States) Shelby Cannon (Australia) Michael Tebbutt	6	6	6
WC	(United States) Adam Peterson (United States) Jeff Salzenstein	2	7	4

==== Second qualifier ====
First round
2	(South Africa) Stefan Kruger (South Africa) Christo van Rensburg	6	6
(Mexico) Jorge Lozano (Mexico) Óscar Ortiz	3	3
(Canada) Sébastien Leblanc (United States) Ari Nathan	7	3	2
7	(Sweden) Ola Kristiansson (Sweden) Mårten Renström	6	6	6

Qualifying competition
2	(South Africa) Stefan Kruger (South Africa) Christo van Rensburg	2	3
7	(Sweden) Ola Kristiansson (Sweden) Mårten Renström	6	6

==== Third qualifier ====
First round
3	(Zimbabwe) Wayne Black (Netherlands) Fernon Wibier	4	6
(Chile) Marcelo Ríos (Netherlands) Sjeng Schalken	6	7
WC	(United States) Cecil Mamiit (United States) Eric Taino	7	6	4
6	(The Bahamas) Roger Smith (Kenya) Paul Wekesa	6	7	6

Qualifying competition
(Chile) Marcelo Ríos (Netherlands) Sjeng Schalken	6	6
6	(The Bahamas) Roger Smith (Kenya) Paul Wekesa	7	7

==== Fourth qualifier ====
First round
4	(Australia) Scott Draper (Australia) Peter Tramacchi	7	7
(United States) Brett Dickinson (North Macedonia) Aleksandar Kitinov	5	6
WC	(United States) Steve Campbell (United States) Todd Nelson	6	2
5	(New Zealand) James Greenhalgh (Belgium) Dick Norman	7	6

Qualifying competition
4	(Australia) Scott Draper (Australia) Peter Tramacchi	6	6	7
5	(New Zealand) James Greenhalgh (Belgium) Dick Norman	2	7	6
