= Ari Nathan =

American tennis player

- Country (sports): United States
- Born: August 31, 1972 (age 52); Los Angeles, California, U.S.
- Height: 6 ft 1 in (185 cm)
- Prize money: $12,545

Singles
- Highest ranking: No. 540 (22 May 1995)

Grand Slam singles results
- Australian Open: Q1 (1995)

Doubles
- Career record: 1–4
- Highest ranking: No. 166 (July 24, 1995)

Grand Slam doubles results
- US Open: Q1 (1995)

Ari Nathan (born August 31, 1972) is an American former professional tennis player.

Born in Los Angeles, Nathan played college tennis while studying at Pepperdine University in the early 1990s. He was an All-American for doubles in 1993 and graduated in 1994, after which he competed briefly on the professional tour.

Nathan had the most impact on tour as a doubles player, with a best ranking of 166 in the world and his ATP Tour main draw appearances including the quarter-finals of Schenectady in 1994. He had a highest ranking of 540 in singles and featured in the singles qualifying draw for the 1995 Australian Open.

== Challenger titles ==
=== Doubles: (1) ===
No.	Date	Tournament	Surface	Partner	Opponents	Score
1.	September 18, 1994	Seoul, South Korea	Hard	(United States) Bill Barber	(Mexico) Óscar Ortiz (Italy) Laurence Tieleman	7–6, 6–2
