= 1995 US Open – Women's singles =

Women's singles
- 1995 US Open

Final
- Champion: (Germany) Steffi Graf
- Runner-up: (United States) Monica Seles
- Score: 7–6^{(8–6)}, 0–6, 6–3

Details
- Draw: 128
- Seeds: 16

Events
Singles	men	women		boys	girls
Doubles	men	women	mixed	boys	girls
WC Singles	men	women	quad
WC Doubles	men	women	quad
Legends	men	women	mixed
← 1994 ·	US Open	· 1996 →

Steffi Graf defeated Monica Seles in the final, 7–6^{(8–6)}, 0–6, 6–3 to win the women's singles tennis title at the 1995 US Open. It was her fourth US Open title and 18th major singles title, equaling Chris Evert and Martina Navratilova's joint Open Era record. Graf became the only player to achieve a quadruple career Grand Slam. It was Seles's first major since her 1993 stabbing.

Arantxa Sánchez Vicario was the defending champion, but lost in the fourth round to Mary Joe Fernández.

== Seeds ==
1. (Germany) Steffi Graf (champion)
2. (United States) Monica Seles (final)
3. (Spain) Arantxa Sánchez Vicario (fourth round)
4. (Spain) Conchita Martínez (semifinals)
5. (Czech Republic) Jana Novotná (quarterfinals)
6. (France) Mary Pierce (third round)
7. (Japan) Kimiko Date (fourth round)
8. (Bulgaria) Magdalena Maleeva (second round)
9. (Argentina) Gabriela Sabatini (semifinals)
10. (United States) Lindsay Davenport (second round)
11. (Germany) Anke Huber (fourth round)
12. (Belarus) Natasha Zvereva (fourth round)
13. (Croatia) Iva Majoli (first round)
14. (United States) Mary Joe Fernández (quarterfinals)
15. (Czech Republic) Helena Suková (second round)
16. (Netherlands) Brenda Schultz-McCarthy (quarterfinals)

== Draw ==
=== Key ===
- Q = Qualifier
- WC = Wild card
- LL = Lucky loser
- Alt = Alternate
- ITF = ITF entry
- PR = Protected ranking
- SR = Special ranking
- SE = Special exempt
- JE = Junior exempt
- JR = Junior Accelerator Programme entrant
- CO = College Accelerator Programme entrant
- NG = Next Gen Accelerator Program entrant
- w/o = Walkover
- r = Retired
- d = Defaulted

=== Finals ===
Quarterfinals
1	(Germany) Steffi Graf	6	6
(United States) Amy Frazier	2	3
14	(United States) Mary Joe Fernández	1	3
9	(Argentina) Gabriela Sabatini	6	6
16	(Netherlands) Brenda Schultz-McCarthy	6	6^{3}	2
4	(Spain) Conchita Martínez	3	7^{7}	6
5	(Czech Republic) Jana Novotná	6^{5}	2
2	(United States) Monica Seles	7^{7}	6

Semifinals
1	(Germany) Steffi Graf	6	7^{7}
9	(Argentina) Gabriela Sabatini	4	6^{5}
4	(Spain) Conchita Martínez	2	2
2	(United States) Monica Seles	6	6

Final
1	(Germany) Steffi Graf	7^{8}	0	6
2	(United States) Monica Seles	6^{6}	6	3

=== Top half ===
==== Section 1 ====
First round
1	(Germany) S Graf	6^{1}	6	6
(South Africa) A Coetzer	7^{7}	1	4
Q	(Italy) R Grande	6	1	6
(Israel) A Smashnova	0	6	4
(Australia) N Bradtke	3	1
(France) N Tauziat	6	6
(Australia) R Stubbs	6^{6}	6	1
(United States) P Shriver	7^{8}	4	6
(United States) G Fernández	4	6	7
(Romania) I Spîrlea	6	1	5
(France) A Dechaume-Balleret	3	0
(France) J Halard	6	6
(Italy) F Perfetti	4	1
(United States) C Rubin	6	6
(France) I Demongeot	4	4
15	(Czech Republic) H Suková	6	6

Second round
1	(Germany) S Graf	6	6
Q	(Italy) R Grande	1	3
(France) N Tauziat	6	6
(United States) P Shriver	4	3
(United States) G Fernández	7^{7}	3	6
(France) J Halard	6^{2}	6	4
(United States) C Rubin	6	6
15	(Czech Republic) H Suková	1	3

Third round
1	(Germany) S Graf	6	6
(France) N Tauziat	3	3
(United States) G Fernández	6^{5}	1
(United States) C Rubin	7^{7}	6

Fourth round
1	(Germany) S Graf	6	6
(United States) C Rubin	2	2

==== Section 2 ====
First round
12	(Belarus) N Zvereva	6	6
(Germany) J Kandarr	4	0
Q	(China) F Li	2	6	2
(Japan) M Endo	6	3	6
(Latvia) L Neiland	6	6
(Austria) B Reinstadler	2	4
(United States) A Grossman	6	6
Q	(Madagascar) D Randriantefy	1	3
(United States) A Frazier	6	6
(Netherlands) S Rottier	0	0
WC	(United States) K Phebus	6	6
WC	(United States) B Rippner	3	1
(Federal Republic of Yugoslavia) T Ječmenica	6	6
(Ukraine) N Medvedeva	3	0
(South Africa) M de Swardt	4	1
6	(France) M Pierce	6	6

Second round
12	(Belarus) N Zvereva	6	3	6
(Japan) M Endo	4	6	4
(Latvia) L Neiland	7^{7}	3	2
(United States) A Grossman	6^{4}	6	6
(United States) A Frazier	6	6
WC	(United States) K Phebus	2	1
(Federal Republic of Yugoslavia) T Ječmenica	3	0
6	(France) M Pierce	6	6

Third round
12	(Belarus) N Zvereva	6	7^{7}
(United States) A Grossman	4	6^{5}
(United States) A Frazier	6	7^{8}
6	(France) M Pierce	3	6^{6}

Fourth round
12	(Belarus) N Zvereva	4	6	3
(United States) A Frazier	6	4	6

==== Section 3 ====
First round
3	(Spain) A Sánchez Vicario	6	6
(Romania) C Cristea	1	1
(United States) S Stafford	6^{3}	4
(South Africa) J Kruger	7^{7}	6
(Argentina) MJ Gaidano	3	7^{7}	6
(Germany) B Rittner	6	6^{2}	1
WC	(United States) L Wild	6^{3}	0
(Argentina) I Gorrochategui	7^{7}	6
Q	(Germany) K Kschwendt	6	3	6
(France) S Pitkowski	1	6	3
(Netherlands) M Oremans	5	5
WC	(United States) K Adams	7	7
(Germany) S Hack	6	6
(South Africa) E Reinach	3	3
(Austria) J Wiesner	6	4	3
14	(United States) MJ Fernández	4	6	6

Second round
3	(Spain) A Sánchez Vicario	6	6
(South Africa) J Kruger	4	3
(Argentina) MJ Gaidano	6	6
(Argentina) I Gorrochategui	4	3
Q	(Germany) K Kschwendt	2	6	4
WC	(United States) K Adams	6	3	6
(Germany) S Hack	6^{3}	3
14	(United States) MJ Fernández	7^{7}	6

Third round
3	(Spain) A Sánchez Vicario	6	6
(Argentina) MJ Gaidano	3	0
WC	(United States) K Adams	3	1
14	(United States) MJ Fernández	6	6

Fourth round
3	(Spain) A Sánchez Vicario	6	4	4
14	(United States) MJ Fernández	1	6	6

==== Section 4 ====
First round
9	(Argentina) G Sabatini	6	6
(Italy) A Serra Zanetti	1	1
(Belgium) E Callens	1	2
Q	(Japan) N Kijimuta	6	6
(Sweden) M Strandlund	2	3
Q	(Austria) M Schnell	6	6
(Russia) E Likhovtseva	2	1
(Belgium) S Appelmans	6	6
(Canada) P Hy-Boulais	2	6	6
(Spain) V Ruano Pascual	6	4	2
(France) L Ghirardi-Rubbi	1	0
(Germany) C Singer	6	6
(Switzerland) M Hingis	6	6
(Belgium) N Feber	2	3
(Canada) J Nejedly	4	2
8	(Bulgaria) M Maleeva	6	6

Second round
9	(Argentina) G Sabatini	6	6
Q	(Japan) N Kijimuta	2	1
Q	(Austria) M Schnell	5	4
(Belgium) S Appelmans	7	6
(Canada) P Hy-Boulais	6	7
(Germany) C Singer	1	5
(Switzerland) M Hingis	4	6	6
8	(Bulgaria) M Maleeva	6	4	2

Third round
9	(Argentina) G Sabatini	6	6
(Belgium) S Appelmans	1	1
(Canada) P Hy-Boulais	6	1	4
(Switzerland) M Hingis	4	6	6

Fourth round
9	(Argentina) G Sabatini	6	6
(Switzerland) M Hingis	2	4

=== Bottom half ===
==== Section 5 ====
First round
7	(Japan) K Date	6	2	6
(Germany) S Meier	0	6	2
(Venezuela) M-A Vento	6	6^{4}	2
(United States) L Raymond	3	7^{7}	6
(Argentina) F Labat	6	6
(Bulgaria) E Pampoulova	1	0
(Hungary) A Temesvári	6	1	4
Q	(Netherlands) M Bollegraf	4	6	6
(United States) J Watanabe	5	6	7
(Poland) K Nowak	7	2	5
(Mexico) A Gavaldón	7^{9}	7^{7}
(Italy) S Farina	6^{7}	6^{2}
(United States) T Whitlinger-Jones	6	4	5
(United States) L Lee	4	6	7
(United States) A Keller	6^{2}	6	6^{3}
16	(Netherlands) B Schultz-McCarthy	7^{7}	2	7^{7}

Second round
7	(Japan) K Date	6	1	6
(United States) L Raymond	2	6	4
(Argentina) F Labat	7	6^{5}	6
Q	(Netherlands) M Bollegraf	5	7^{7}	4
(United States) J Watanabe	3	1
(Mexico) A Gavaldón	6	6
(United States) L Lee	6	3	4
16	(Netherlands) B Schultz-McCarthy	4	6	6

Third round
7	(Japan) K Date	3	6	6
(Argentina) F Labat	6	1	4
(Mexico) A Gavaldón	2	5
16	(Netherlands) B Schultz-McCarthy	6	7

Fourth round
7	(Japan) K Date	5	6	2
16	(Netherlands) B Schultz-McCarthy	7	3	6

==== Section 6 ====
First round
10	(United States) L Davenport	6	6
(Netherlands) P Kamstra	2	2
(Netherlands) K Boogert	3	6	6^{5}
(United States) Z Garrison-Jackson	6	1	7^{7}
(Slovakia) R Zrubáková	6	3	6
WC	(United States) L Poruri	1	6	2
(Japan) N Miyagi	6^{5}	4
(United States) N Arendt	7^{7}	6
Q	(United States) J Lee	7^{7}	7^{7}
(Austria) B Schett	6^{2}	6^{2}
(Japan) N Sawamatsu	1	6	6
(Australia) R McQuillan	6	1	3
(Czech Republic) R Bobková	2	1
WC	(United States) K Po	6	6
WC	(United States) K Rinaldi-Stunkel	2	2
4	(Spain) C Martínez	6	6

Second round
10	(United States) L Davenport	1	3
(United States) Z Garrison-Jackson	6	6
(Slovakia) R Zrubáková	5	3
(United States) N Arendt	7	6
Q	(United States) J Lee	3	3
(Japan) N Sawamatsu	6	6
WC	(United States) K Po	1	4
4	(Spain) C Martínez	6	6

Third round
(United States) Z Garrison-Jackson	6	7^{7}
(United States) N Arendt	0	6^{3}
(Japan) N Sawamatsu	1	2
4	(Spain) C Martínez	6	6

Fourth round
(United States) Z Garrison-Jackson	6^{5}	5
4	(Spain) C Martínez	7^{7}	7

==== Section 7 ====
First round
5	(Czech Republic) J Novotná	6	6
(Italy) S Cecchini	2	0
(Sweden) Å Carlsson	6	6
(United States) S Cacic	4	2
(Germany) V Martinek	3	0
(Belgium) D Monami	6	6
(France) S Testud	7	6
(Argentina) P Suárez	5	4
(Belgium) L Courtois	4	6^{0}
(Slovakia) K Studeníková	6	7^{7}
(Belarus) T Ignatieva	0	2
(Japan) A Sugiyama	6	6
(Italy) N Baudone	6	6
(Japan) K Nagatsuka	2	4
(Austria) B Paulus	6	6
13	(Croatia) I Majoli	4	4

Second round
5	(Czech Republic) J Novotná	6	6
(Sweden) Å Carlsson	1	2
(Belgium) D Monami	1	4
(France) S Testud	6	6
(Slovakia) K Studeníková	6	6
(Japan) A Sugiyama	3	3
(Italy) N Baudone	6	6
(Austria) B Paulus	4	1

Third round
5	(Czech Republic) J Novotná	6	7
(France) S Testud	4	5
(Slovakia) K Studeníková	4	6	6
(Italy) N Baudone	6	3	2

Fourth round
5	(Czech Republic) J Novotná	6	6
(Slovakia) K Studeníková	4	3

==== Section 8 ====
First round
11	(Germany) A Huber	6	6
(Indonesia) Y Basuki	2	3
(Slovakia) K Habšudová	6	3	3
WC	(United States) A Miller	4	6	6
(Russia) E Makarova	6	7
(United States) M McGrath	1	5
(Czech Republic) L Richterová	3	7^{7}	2
(United States) L McNeil	6	6^{2}	6
(South Korea) S-h Park	5	6^{6}
(United States) M Werdel-Witmeyer	7	7^{8}
(Hong Kong) M Tang	5	5
(Japan) Y Kamio	7	7
(Austria) P Schwarz-Ritter	6^{6}	2
(United States) E deLone	7^{8}	6
(Romania) R Dragomir	3	1
2	(United States) M Seles	6	6

Second round
11	(Germany) A Huber	6	7
WC	(United States) A Miller	0	5
(Russia) E Makarova	4	6	7^{7}
(United States) L McNeil	6	2	6^{3}
(United States) M Werdel-Witmeyer	2	7^{7}	3
(Japan) Y Kamio	6	6^{0}	6
(United States) E deLone	2	1
2	(United States) M Seles	6	6

Third round
11	(Germany) A Huber	2	6	6
(Russia) E Makarova	6	3	1
(Japan) Y Kamio	1	1
2	(United States) M Seles	6	6

Fourth round
11	(Germany) A Huber	1	4
2	(United States) M Seles	6	6

Preceded by 1995 Wimbledon Championships – Women's singles	Grand Slam women's singles	Succeeded by 1996 Australian Open – Women's singles
