= 1995 US Open – Men's singles =

Men's singles
- 1995 US Open

Final
- Champion: (United States) Pete Sampras
- Runner-up: (United States) Andre Agassi
- Score: 6–4, 6–3, 4–6, 7–5

Details
- Draw: 128
- Seeds: 16

Events
Singles	men	women		boys	girls
Doubles	men	women	mixed	boys	girls
WC Singles	men	women	quad
WC Doubles	men	women	quad
Legends	men	women	mixed
- US Open

Pete Sampras defeated defending champion Andre Agassi in the final, 6–4, 6–3, 4–6, 7–5 to win the men's singles tennis title at the 1995 US Open. It was his third US Open title and seventh major title overall.

Agassi later named his defeat in the final as a contributing factor to his mental struggles and performance slump over the next two years.

This tournament marked the final US Open appearances of former world no. 1s and 1988 and 1989 champions Mats Wilander and Boris Becker, respectively. Wilander lost to Todd Martin in the second round, while Becker lost to Agassi in the semifinals.

== Seeds ==
The seeded players are listed below. Pete Sampras is the champion; others show the round in which they were eliminated.

1. (United States) Andre Agassi (finalist)
2. (United States) Pete Sampras (champion)
3. (Austria) Thomas Muster (fourth round)
4. (Germany) Boris Becker (semifinalist)
5. (United States) Michael Chang (quarterfinalist)
6. (Croatia) Goran Ivanišević (first round)
7. (Russia) Yevgeny Kafelnikov (third round)
8. (Germany) Michael Stich (fourth round)
9. (Sweden) Thomas Enqvist (second round)
10. (South Africa) Wayne Ferreira (first round)
11. (Spain) Sergi Bruguera (second round)
12. (Netherlands) Richard Krajicek (third round)
13. (Switzerland) Marc Rosset (fourth round)
14. (United States) Jim Courier (semifinalist)
15. (United States) Todd Martin (fourth round)
16. (Ukraine) Andrei Medvedev (second round)

== Draw ==
Key

- Q = Qualifier
- WC = Wild card
- LL = Lucky loser
- Alt = Alternate
- ITF = ITF entry
- PR = Protected ranking
- SR = Special ranking
- SE = Special exempt
- JE = Junior exempt
- JR = Junior Accelerator Programme entrant
- CO = College Accelerator Programme entrant
- NG = Next Gen Accelerator Program entrant
- w/o = Walkover
- r = Retired
- d = Defaulted

=== Final eight ===
Quarterfinals
1	(United States) Andre Agassi	6	6	1	7
(Czech Republic) Petr Korda	4	2	6	5
4	(Germany) Boris Becker	6	7^{7}	6^{3}	7^{8}
(United States) Patrick McEnroe	4	6^{2}	7^{7}	6^{6}
5	(United States) Michael Chang	6^{5}	6^{3}	5
14	(United States) Jim Courier	7^{7}	7^{7}	7
(Zimbabwe) Byron Black	6^{3}	4	0
2	(United States) Pete Sampras	7^{7}	6	6

Semifinals
1	(United States) Andre Agassi	7^{7}	7^{7}	4	6
4	(Germany) Boris Becker	6^{4}	6^{2}	6	4
14	(United States) Jim Courier	5	6	4	5
2	(United States) Pete Sampras	7	4	6	7

Final
1	(United States) Andre Agassi	4	3	6	5
2	(United States) Pete Sampras	6	6	4	7

=== Section 1 ===
First round
1	(United States) A Agassi	6	6	6
(United States) B Shelton	2	2	2
(Spain) A Corretja	6	6	6
WC	(United States) A O'Brien	4	4	3
Q	(Canada) D Nestor	6	6	3	6
(Russia) A Olhovskiy	3	4	6	1
(Sweden) S Edberg	6	6	7^{7}
(Czech Republic) M Damm	0	3	6^{4}
Q	(Spain) JA Viloca	3	6	4	3
Q	(United Kingdom) T Henman	6	4	6	6
(United States) J Palmer	6	7	6
Q	(Mexico) L Lavalle	4	5	3
WC	(Armenia) S Sargsian	7^{7}	2	4	6	6
(United States) M Joyce	6^{1}	6	6	3	1
Q	(Morocco) H Arazi	7^{7}	3	4	4
16	(Ukraine) A Medvedev	6^{5}	6	6	6

Second round
1	(United States) A Agassi	5	6	5	6	6
(Spain) A Corretja	7	3	7	0	2
Q	(Canada) D Nestor	1	6^{4}	6	1
(Sweden) S Edberg	6	7^{7}	2	6
Q	(United Kingdom) T Henman	4	7^{10}	3	1
(United States) J Palmer	6	6^{8}	6	6
WC	(Armenia) S Sargsian	1	4	6	6	6
16	(Ukraine) A Medvedev	6	6	3	2	4

3rd round
1	(United States) A Agassi	6	6	6
(Sweden) S Edberg	4	3	1
(United States) J Palmer	6	6	6
WC	(Armenia) S Sargsian	3	2	2

4th round
1	(United States) A Agassi	7	6	6
(United States) J Palmer	5	3	2

=== Section 2 ===
First round
10	(South Africa) W Ferreira	5	6^{5}	1
Q	(France) J Golmard	7	7^{7}	6
(South Africa) M Ondruska	7^{7}	6	6
Q	(United Kingdom) M Petchey	6^{0}	1	0
(Japan) S Matsuoka	6^{4}	7^{7}	7^{10}	5^{d}
(Czech Republic) P Korda	7^{7}	6^{4}	6^{8}	6
Q	(Zimbabwe) W Black	2	2	4
(Netherlands) J Eltingh	6	6	6
(United Kingdom) J Bates	2	2	3
(Spain) E Sánchez	6	6	6
(Germany) H Dreekmann	4	5	4
(United States) V Spadea	6	7	6
(Portugal) N Marques	6^{3}	7	6	6
Q	(India) M Bhupathi	7^{7}	5	1	3
(United States) J Tarango	0	4	5
7	(Russia) Y Kafelnikov	6	6	7

Second round
Q	(France) J Golmard	4	4	3
(South Africa) M Ondruska	6	6	6
(Czech Republic) P Korda	6	6	3	6
(Netherlands) J Eltingh	2	4	6	1
(Spain) E Sánchez	1	6^{7}	3
(United States) V Spadea	6	7^{9}	6
(Portugal) N Marques	3	4	4
7	(Russia) Y Kafelnikov	6	6	6

Third round
(South Africa) M Ondruska	3	2	5
(Czech Republic) P Korda	6	6	7
(United States) V Spadea	6	6	6
7	(Russia) Y Kafelnikov	2	4	4

Fourth round
(Czech Republic) P Korda	6	7	6
(United States) V Spadea	2	5	4

=== Section 3 ===
First round
4	(Germany) B Becker	6	6	6
(Spain) A López Morón	1	0	3
(Germany) C Arriens	6	7^{7}	6
(Slovakia) K Kučera	4	6^{3}	2
(France) L Roux	6	3	1	6	4
(United States) A Krickstein	3	6	6	3	6
(Australia) J Stoltenberg	6	6	6
(Czech Republic) R Vašek	4	4	3
(France) O Delaître	3	3	1
(Italy) R Furlan	6	6	6
(United States) D Rostagno	6	6	6
(Netherlands) J Siemerink	4	4	4
(Australia) P Rafter	7^{7}	6	6
(United States) R Reneberg	6^{3}	3	4
(Italy) A Gaudenzi	7^{7}	3	1	0
13	(Switzerland) M Rosset	6^{3}	6	6	6

Second round
4	(Germany) B Becker	6	6	7
(Germany) C Arriens	1	3	5
(United States) A Krickstein	2	4	6	6	1
(Australia) J Stoltenberg	6	6	2	4	6
(Italy) R Furlan	6	6	6
(United States) D Rostagno	4	2	4
(Australia) P Rafter	4	4	6	3
13	(Switzerland) M Rosset	6	6	3	6

Third round
4	(Germany) B Becker	6	4	6	6
(Australia) J Stoltenberg	2	6	0	4
(Italy) R Furlan	1	6^{2}	6	5
13	(Switzerland) M Rosset	6	7^{7}	3	7

Fourth round
4	(Germany) B Becker	7^{7}	6	6
13	(Switzerland) M Rosset	6^{4}	3	3

=== Section 4 ===
First round
11	(Spain) S Bruguera	6	6	6
(Belgium) J Van Herck	3	4	4
(Germany) M Sinner	4	7^{8}	3	6	6^{4}
(Czech Republic) D Vacek	6	6^{6}	6	2	7^{7}
Q	(Venezuela) N Pereira	2	6	5	7^{10}	7^{7}
(France) F Santoro	6	4	7	6^{8}	6^{3}
(United Kingdom) G Rusedski	6^{5}	4	7^{8}	1
Q	(Netherlands) J Winnink	7^{7}	6	6^{6}	6
(Czech Republic) B Ulihrach	6	6	6
(France) G Raoux	3	2	1
WC	(United States) B Hansen-Dent	2	4	1
(Russia) A Volkov	6	6	6
(United States) P McEnroe	6	3	6	3	6
Q	(Sweden) N Kulti	3	6	3	6	4
(New Zealand) B Steven	4	2	6	3
6	(Croatia) G Ivanišević	6	6	3	1^{r}

Second round
11	(Spain) S Bruguera	2	3	4
(Czech Republic) D Vacek	6	6	6
Q	(Venezuela) N Pereira	7^{7}	6	2	6
Q	(Netherlands) J Winnink	6^{4}	4	6	3
(Czech Republic) B Ulihrach	3	6	1	3
(Russia) A Volkov	6	4	6	6
(United States) P McEnroe	6	6	6
(New Zealand) B Steven	2	2	2

Third round
(Czech Republic) D Vacek	4	7^{7}	6	7^{7}
Q	(Venezuela) N Pereira	6	6^{5}	2	6^{3}
(Russia) A Volkov	6	6	1	6^{4}	2
(United States) P McEnroe	4	2	6	7^{7}	6

Fourth round
(Czech Republic) D Vacek	6^{8}	3	4
(United States) P McEnroe	7^{10}	6	6

=== Section 5 ===
First round
5	(United States) M Chang	6	6	6
(Italy) G Pozzi	0	1	0
(Italy) S Pescosolido	2	6	6	6
(Czech Republic) J Novák	6	3	4	1
WC	(United States) C Woodruff	4	6^{5}	4
(Australia) T Woodbridge	6	7^{7}	6
(Germany) A Mronz	3	6	4	2
(Switzerland) J Hlasek	6	4	6	6
(United States) D Wheaton	7^{12}	5	7	6
Q	(South Africa) N Godwin	6^{10}	7	5	1
(Australia) M Tebbutt	6	6	7^{7}
(Sweden) A Järryd	4	3	6^{4}
WC	(United States) J Gimelstob	6	6	4	4	6
(Germany) D Prinosil	4	4	6	6	3
(Czech Republic) K Nováček	3	4	4
12	(Netherlands) R Krajicek	6	6	6

Second round
5	(United States) M Chang	4	6	6	6
(Italy) S Pescosolido	6	3	4	4
(Australia) T Woodbridge	6	6	3	6
(Switzerland) J Hlasek	3	4	6	2
(United States) D Wheaton	3	3	4
(Australia) M Tebbutt	6	6	6
WC	(United States) J Gimelstob	4	2	4
12	(Netherlands) R Krajicek	6	6	6

Third round
5	(United States) M Chang	6	6	6
(Australia) T Woodbridge	3	2	0
(Australia) M Tebbutt	6	3	6^{5}	7^{7}	7^{7}
12	(Netherlands) R Krajicek	3	6	7^{7}	6^{4}	6^{4}

Fourth round
5	(United States) M Chang	6	6	4	6
(Australia) M Tebbutt	2	2	6	3

=== Section 6 ===
First round
14	(United States) J Courier	6	6	3	6
(Germany) B Karbacher	3	4	6	3
(Romania) A Voinea	4	6	6	4	5
(Canada) S Lareau	6	3	4	6	7
(United States) J Grabb	7^{8}	6^{1}	2	6	2
(Denmark) K Carlsen	6^{6}	7^{7}	6	3	6
Q	(Germany) K Braasch	6	6^{4}	7^{7}	6
WC	(United States) S Humphries	3	7^{7}	6^{5}	3
(France) C Pioline	6	7	6
(Netherlands) S Schalken	4	5	1
(Norway) C Ruud	1	4	4
(Spain) F Clavet	6	6	6
(Australia) M Woodforde	6	6	6
(Belgium) K Goossens	3	3	4
WC	(United States) L Jensen	6^{3}	3	0
3	(Austria) T Muster	7^{7}	6	6

Second round
14	(United States) J Courier	6	6	6
(Canada) S Lareau	3	4	4
(Denmark) K Carlsen	6^{2}	6^{3}	7^{7}	6
Q	(Germany) K Braasch	7^{7}	7^{7}	6^{4}	5^{r}
(France) C Pioline	4	7	5	0
(Spain) F Clavet	6	5	7	6
(Australia) M Woodforde	6	2	2	4
3	(Austria) T Muster	4	6	6	6

Third round
14	(United States) J Courier	6	6	6
(Denmark) K Carlsen	3	4	2
(Spain) F Clavet	6	4	3	5
3	(Austria) T Muster	0	6	6	7

Fourth round
14	(United States) J Courier	6	6	7^{7}
3	(Austria) T Muster	3	0	6^{4}

=== Section 7 ===
First round
8	(Germany) M Stich	6	6	6
(Spain) J Sánchez	2	3	0
(Argentina) H Gumy	6	6	6
(United States) J Stark	4	4	3
(Russia) A Chesnokov	6	6	6
(United States) M Washington	2	4	4
(Australia) S Draper	6	6	3	6
(Italy) C Caratti	2	3	6	3
Q	(The Bahamas) M Knowles	1	5	1
(Sweden) J Björkman	6	7	6
(Netherlands) P Haarhuis	6^{6}	6	6	6^{3}	7
(Austria) G Schaller	7^{8}	1	3	7^{7}	5
(Zimbabwe) B Black	7^{7}	6	6
(France) A Boetsch	6^{3}	3	3
(Chile) M Ríos	6	2	6	3	6^{7}
9	(Sweden) T Enqvist	2	6	4	6	7^{9}

Second round
8	(Germany) M Stich	6	1	6	2	6
(Argentina) H Gumy	3	6	2	6	3
(Russia) A Chesnokov	3	6	6	6^{3}	3
(Australia) S Draper	6	4	4	7^{7}	6
(Sweden) J Björkman	6	6	6
(Netherlands) P Haarhuis	4	4	3
(Zimbabwe) B Black	6	6	3	6
9	(Sweden) T Enqvist	4	4	6	3

Third round
8	(Germany) M Stich	6	6	6
(Australia) S Draper	3	0	3
(Sweden) J Björkman	3	6^{5}	1
(Zimbabwe) B Black	6	7^{7}	6

Fourth round
8	(Germany) M Stich	4	4	6	6	3
(Zimbabwe) B Black	6	6	3	2	6

=== Section 8 ===
First round
15	(United States) T Martin	6	7	4	6
(France) G Forget	3	5	6	4
(Sweden) M Wilander	3	6	3	6	6
WC	(United States) S Campbell	6	1	6	4	2
(Spain) J Burillo	2	6	3	6	2
(Denmark) F Fetterlein	6	2	6	4	6
(Colombia) M Hadad	7	6	6
Q	(France) J-P Fleurian	5	4	2
(Sweden) J Apell	2	6^{3}	1
(Germany) M-K Göllner	6	7^{7}	6
(Kenya) P Wekesa	6^{4}	0	0^{r}
(Australia) M Philippoussis	7^{7}	6	1
(Peru) J Yzaga	6	5	2	6	6
(Argentina) J Frana	2	7	6	3	4
(Brazil) F Meligeni	0	3	4
2	(United States) P Sampras	6	6	6

Second round
15	(United States) T Martin	6	6	7
(Sweden) M Wilander	4	2	5
(Denmark) F Fetterlein	3	6	2	5
(Colombia) M Hadad	6	2	6	7
(Germany) M-K Göllner	6^{5}	2	5
(Australia) M Philippoussis	7^{7}	6	7
(Peru) J Yzaga	1	4	3
2	(United States) P Sampras	6	6	6

Third round
15	(United States) T Martin	6	6	6
(Colombia) M Hadad	2	1	4
(Australia) M Philippoussis	7^{7}	5	5	3
2	(United States) P Sampras	6^{5}	7	7	6

Fourth round
15	(United States) T Martin	6^{4}	3	4
2	(United States) P Sampras	7^{7}	6	6

Preceded by 1995 Wimbledon Championships – Men's singles	Grand Slam men's singles	Succeeded by 1996 Australian Open – Men's singles
