= 1995 US Open – Mixed doubles =

Mixed doubles
- 1995 US Open
- 1994 Champions: (South Africa) Elna Reinach (United States) Patrick Galbraith

Final
- Champions: (United States) Meredith McGrath (United States) Matt Lucena
- Runners-up: (United States) Gigi Fernández (Czech Republic) Cyril Suk
- Score: 6–4, 6–4

Details
- Draw: 32
- Seeds: 8

Events
Singles	men	women		boys	girls
Doubles	men	women	mixed	boys	girls
WC Singles	men	women	quad
WC Doubles	men	women	quad
Legends	men	women	mixed
- US Open

Elna Reinach and Patrick Galbraith were the defending champions but lost in the first round to Mary Pierce and Luke Jensen.

Meredith McGrath and Matt Lucena won in the final 6–4, 6–4 against Gigi Fernández and Cyril Suk.

== Seeds ==
Champion seeds are indicated in bold text while text in italics indicates the round in which those seeds were eliminated.

1. (Latvia) Larisa Neiland / (Australia) Mark Woodforde (first round)
2. (United States) Lisa Raymond / (The Bahamas) Mark Knowles (first round)
3. (United States) Gigi Fernández / (Czech Republic) Cyril Suk (final)
4. (Netherlands) Brenda Schultz-McCarthy / (United States) Rick Leach (quarterfinals)
5. (South Africa) Elna Reinach / (United States) Patrick Galbraith (first round)
6. (United States) Martina Navratilova / (United States) Jonathan Stark (quarterfinals)
7. (Netherlands) Manon Bollegraf / (United States) Trevor Kronemann (first round)
8. (United States) Mary Joe Fernández / (Australia) Sandon Stolle (withdrew)

== Draw ==
Key

- Q = Qualifier
- WC = Wild card
- LL = Lucky loser
- Alt = Alternate
- ITF = ITF entry
- PR = Protected ranking
- SR = Special ranking
- SE = Special exempt
- JE = Junior exempt
- JR = Junior Accelerator Programme entrant
- CO = College Accelerator Programme entrant
- NG = Next Gen Accelerator Program entrant
- w/o = Walkover
- r = Retired
- d = Defaulted

=== Final ===
Final
3	(United States) Gigi Fernández (Czech Republic) Cyril Suk	4	4
	(United States) **Meredith McGrath** (United States) **Matt Lucena**	**6**	**6**

=== Top half ===
First round
1	(Latvia) L Neiland (Australia) M Woodforde	**6**	5	3
WC	(United States) **C Rubin** (United States) **B MacPhie**	4	**7**	**6**
WC	(United States) P Shriver (United States) S Humphries	4	4
(Canada) **R Simpson** (Belgium) **L Pimek**	**6**	**6**
(United States) **A Frazier** (United States) **J Tarango**	**6**	**6**
WC	(United States) S Stafford (United States) J Waite	4	3
(United States) **K Adams** (United States) **S Melville**	**6**	3	**6**
7	(Netherlands) M Bollegraf (United States) T Kronemann	4	**6**	1
3	(United States) **G Fernández** (Czech Republic) **C Suk**	**6**	**6**
(Australia) R Stubbs (United States) K Jones	3	4
(Netherlands) C Vis (Australia) A Florent	4	1
(Argentina) **P Tarabini** (Argentina) **L Lobo**	**6**	**6**
(United States) **R White** (Netherlands) **T Kempers**	4	**7**	**7**
(Germany) C Porwik (Russia) A Olhovskiy	**6**	5	5
(Australia) K Radford (Australia) M Philippoussis	3	4
6	(United States) **M Navratilova** (United States) **J Stark**	**6**	**6**

Second round
WC	(United States) **C Rubin** (United States) **B MacPhie**	**6**	**6**
(Canada) R Simpson (Belgium) L Pimek	3	2
(United States) A Frazier (United States) J Tarango	**6**	4	4
(United States) **K Adams** (United States) **S Melville**	3	**6**	**6**
3	(United States) **G Fernández** (Czech Republic) **C Suk**	w/o
(Argentina) P Tarabini (Argentina) L Lobo
(United States) R White (Netherlands) T Kempers	2	4
6	(United States) **M Navratilova** (United States) **J Stark**	**6**	**6**

Quarterfinals
WC	(United States) **C Rubin** (United States) **B MacPhie**	**7^{7}**	6^{2}	**6**
(United States) K Adams (United States) S Melville	6^{5}	**7^{7}**	2
3	(United States) **G Fernández** (Czech Republic) **C Suk**	**7**	**7^{7}**
6	(United States) M Navratilova (United States) J Stark	5	6^{3}

Semifinals
WC	(United States) C Rubin (United States) B MacPhie	3	**6**	3
3	(United States) **G Fernández** (Czech Republic) **C Suk**	**6**	2	**6**

=== Bottom half ===
First round
5	(South Africa) E Reinach (United States) P Galbraith	3	3
WC	(France) **M Pierce** (United States) **L Jensen**	**6**	**6**
(United States) L McNeil (United States) M Keil	**6**	6^{4}	5
(Netherlands) **K Boogert** (Netherlands) **M Oosting**	3	**7^{7}**	**7**
(Netherlands) **N Muns-Jagerman** (United States) **G Van Emburgh**	**6**	**6**
(United States) L Wild (South Africa) B Talbot	3	4
(Canada) J Hetherington (South Africa) J-L de Jager	3	**7**	2
4	(Netherlands) **B Schultz-McCarthy** (United States) **R Leach**	**6**	5	**6**
ALT	(Japan) **N Miyagi** (United States) **K Kinnear**	**6**	**6**
(United States) N Arendt (Australia) W Arthurs	4	2
(Indonesia) Y Basuki (India) L Paes	4	4
(Romania) **I Spîrlea** (Italy) **D Nargiso**	**6**	**6**
(Netherlands) **M Oremans** (Netherlands) **T Nijssen**	2	**6**	**6**
(Russia) E Maniokova (South Africa) D Adams	**6**	3	2
(United States) **M McGrath** (United States) **M Lucena**	**6**	**6**
2	(United States) L Raymond (The Bahamas) M Knowles	4	4

Second round
WC	(France) **M Pierce** (United States) **L Jensen**	**6**	**6**
(Netherlands) K Boogert (Netherlands) M Oosting	3	2
(Netherlands) N Muns-Jagerman (United States) G Van Emburgh	**6**	6^{6}	4
4	(Netherlands) **B Schultz-McCarthy** (United States) **R Leach**	3	**7^{8}**	**6**
ALT	(Japan) N Miyagi (United States) K Kinnear	4	4
(Romania) **I Spîrlea** (Italy) **D Nargiso**	**6**	**6**
(Netherlands) M Oremans (Netherlands) T Nijssen	4	**6**	2
(United States) **M McGrath** (United States) **M Lucena**	**6**	4	**6**

Quarterfinals
WC	(France) **M Pierce** (United States) **L Jensen**	**7**	**6**
4	(Netherlands) B Schultz-McCarthy (United States) R Leach	5	4
(Romania) I Spîrlea (Italy) D Nargiso	0	6^{4}
(United States) **M McGrath** (United States) **M Lucena**	**6**	**7^{7}**

Semifinals
WC	(France) M Pierce (United States) L Jensen	5	6^{2}
(United States) **M McGrath** (United States) **M Lucena**	**7**	**7^{7}**
