= 1995 US Open – Women's doubles =

Women's doubles
- 1995 US Open

Final
- Champions: (United States) Gigi Fernández (Belarus) Natasha Zvereva
- Runners-up: (Netherlands) Brenda Schultz-McCarthy (Australia) Rennae Stubbs
- Score: 7–5, 6–3

Details
- Draw: 64 (4 Q / 3 WC )
- Seeds: 16

Events
Singles	men	women		boys	girls
Doubles	men	women	mixed	boys	girls
WC Singles	men	women	quad
WC Doubles	men	women	quad
Legends	men	women	mixed
← 1994 ·	US Open	· 1996 →

Jana Novotná and Arantxa Sánchez Vicario were the defending champions, but lost in quarterfinals to Brenda Schultz-McCarthy and Rennae Stubbs.

Gigi Fernández and Natasha Zvereva won the title by defeating Brenda Schultz-McCarthy and Rennae Stubbs 7–5, 6–3 in the final. It was the 4th US Open, 14th Grand Slam title and 61st overall title for Fernández and the 3rd US Open, 14th Grand Slam title and 56th overall title for Zvereva, in their respective doubles careers. It was also the 6th title for the pair during the season, after their wins in Tokyo, Rome, the French Open, San Diego and Los Angeles.

The 1995 grand slam season was the first time Fernández and Zvereva made the finals of all 4 grand slams. The previous three seasons saw them win 3 of the slams, only to lose in the semifinals in the other slam. The 1995 US Open marked their 13th grand slam final in the last 16 tournaments, winning 11 of those 13 finals.

== Seeds ==
1. (Czech Republic) Jana Novotná / (Spain) Arantxa Sánchez Vicario (quarterfinals)
2. (United States) Gigi Fernández / (Belarus) Natasha Zvereva (champions)
3. (United States) Meredith McGrath / (Latvia) Larisa Neiland (third round)
4. (United States) Lindsay Davenport / (United States) Lisa Raymond (third round)
5. (United States) Nicole Arendt / (Netherlands) Manon Bollegraf (second round)
6. (Netherlands) Brenda Schultz-McCarthy / (Australia) Rennae Stubbs (final)
7. (Spain) Conchita Martínez / (Argentina) Patricia Tarabini (quarterfinals)
8. (United States) Martina Navratilova / (Argentina) Gabriela Sabatini (second round)
9. (France) Julie Halard / (France) Nathalie Tauziat (quarterfinals)
10. (South Africa) Elna Reinach / (Romania) Irina Spîrlea (third round)
11. (South Africa) Amanda Coetzer / (Argentina) Inés Gorrochategui (first round)
12. (United States) Katrina Adams / (United States) Zina Garrison-Jackson (third round)
13. (Switzerland) Martina Hingis / (Croatia) Iva Majoli (third round)
14. (Netherlands) Kristie Boogert / (Netherlands) Nicole Muns-Jagerman (second round)
15. (United States) Lori McNeil / (Czech Republic) Helena Suková (semifinals)
16. (Australia) Nicole Bradtke / (United States) Linda Harvey-Wild (third round)

== Draw ==
=== Key ===
- Q = Qualifier
- WC = Wild card
- LL = Lucky loser
- Alt = Alternate
- ITF = ITF entry
- PR = Protected ranking
- SR = Special ranking
- SE = Special exempt
- JE = Junior exempt
- JR = Junior Accelerator Programme entrant
- CO = College Accelerator Programme entrant
- NG = Next Gen Accelerator Program entrant
- w/o = Walkover
- r = Retired
- d = Defaulted

=== Finals ===
Quarterfinals
1	(Czech Republic) Jana Novotná (Spain) Arantxa Sánchez Vicario	7^{7}	4	6^{3}
6	(Netherlands) Brenda Schultz-McCarthy (Australia) Rennae Stubbs	6^{4}	6	7^{7}
(Canada) Jill Hetherington (Australia) Kristine Radford	4	7	7
7	(Spain) Conchita Martínez (Argentina) Patricia Tarabini	6	5	5
9	(France) Julie Halard (France) Nathalie Tauziat	4	6	4
15	(United States) Lori McNeil (Czech Republic) Helena Suková	6	3	6
(United States) Chanda Rubin (United States) Pam Shriver	7	1	3
2	(United States) Gigi Fernández (Belarus) Natasha Zvereva	5	6	6

Semifinals
6	(Netherlands) Brenda Schultz-McCarthy (Australia) Rennae Stubbs	6	7^{8}
(Canada) Jill Hetherington (Australia) Kristine Radford	4	6^{6}
15	(United States) Lori McNeil (Czech Republic) Helena Suková	3	4
2	(United States) Gigi Fernández (Belarus) Natasha Zvereva	6	6

Final
6	(Netherlands) Brenda Schultz-McCarthy (Australia) Rennae Stubbs	5	3
2	(United States) Gigi Fernández (Belarus) Natasha Zvereva	7	6

=== Top half ===
==== Section 1 ====
First round
1	(Czech Republic) J Novotná (Spain) A Sánchez Vicario	6	6
(South Africa) M de Swardt (South Africa) J Kruger	4	1
(Russia) E Makarova (Russia) E Maniokova	6	6
(Czech Republic) P Langrová (France) N van Lottum	1	4
(Japan) H Nagano (Bulgaria) E Wagner	6	6
(United States) L Poruri (United States) M Tu	3	2
(Argentina) M Paz (United States) S Stafford	3	3
16	(Australia) N Bradtke (United States) L Harvey-Wild	6	6
14	(Netherlands) K Boogert (Netherlands) N Muns-Jagerman	6	7^{7}
WC	(United States) K Phebus (United States) S Starrett	2	6^{3}
(France) A Dechaume-Balleret (France) S Testud	4	4
(Belgium) L Courtois (Belgium) N Feber	6	6
(France) S Amiach (United States) V Paynter	6	4	3
(Canada) C Delisle (Australia) N Pratt	3	6	6
(Belgium) E Callens (Slovenia) T Križan	1	4
6	(Netherlands) B Schultz-McCarthy (Australia) R Stubbs	6	6

Second round
1	(Czech Republic) J Novotná (Spain) A Sánchez Vicario	w/o
(Russia) E Makarova (Russia) E Maniokova
(Japan) H Nagano (Bulgaria) E Wagner	2	3
16	(Australia) N Bradtke (United States) L Harvey-Wild	6	6
14	(Netherlands) K Boogert (Netherlands) N Muns-Jagerman	6	1	0
(Belgium) L Courtois (Belgium) N Feber	3	6	6
(Canada) C Delisle (Australia) N Pratt	3	4
6	(Netherlands) B Schultz-McCarthy (Australia) R Stubbs	6	6

Third round
1	(Czech Republic) J Novotná (Spain) A Sánchez Vicario	6	6
16	(Australia) N Bradtke (United States) L Harvey-Wild	2	2
(Belgium) L Courtois (Belgium) N Feber	3	0
6	(Netherlands) B Schultz-McCarthy (Australia) R Stubbs	6	6

Quarterfinals
1	(Czech Republic) J Novotná (Spain) A Sánchez Vicario	7^{7}	4	6^{3}
6	(Netherlands) B Schultz-McCarthy (Australia) R Stubbs	6^{4}	6	7^{7}

==== Section 2 ====
First round
3	(United States) M McGrath (Latvia) L Neiland	6	7^{7}
(Italy) S Cecchini (France) I Demongeot	1	6^{2}
(Canada) P Hy-Boulais (Argentina) F Labat	5	7	6
(United States) E deLone (United States) A Keller	7	5	3
(Canada) J Hetherington (Australia) K Radford	6^{5}	7	6
Q	(United Kingdom) V Lake (Australia) L Pleming	7^{7}	5	4
(Australia) R McQuillan (Germany) C Porwik	6	5	6
11	(South Africa) A Coetzer (Argentina) I Gorrochategui	3	7	2
10	(South Africa) E Reinach (Romania) I Spîrlea	6	4	6
(Sweden) M Lindström (Sweden) M Strandlund	4	6	3
(United States) E Hakami (United States) D Scott	6	2	0
(Austria) P Schwarz-Ritter (Slovakia) K Studeníková	3	6	6
(Czech Republic) E Melicharová (Czech Republic) H Vildová	2	7^{7}	6
(Italy) R Grande (Japan) N Miyagi	6	6^{4}	2
(Romania) C Cristea (Romania) R Dragomir	2	4
7	(Spain) C Martínez (Argentina) P Tarabini	6	6

Second round
3	(United States) M McGrath (Latvia) L Neiland	6	6
(Canada) P Hy-Boulais (Argentina) F Labat	4	2
(Canada) J Hetherington (Australia) K Radford	6	6
(Australia) R McQuillan (Germany) C Porwik	3	2
10	(South Africa) E Reinach (Romania) I Spîrlea	6	6
(Austria) P Schwarz-Ritter (Slovakia) K Studeníková	0	0
(Czech Republic) E Melicharová (Czech Republic) H Vildová	5	6	4
7	(Spain) C Martínez (Argentina) P Tarabini	7	3	6

Third round
3	(United States) M McGrath (Latvia) L Neiland	6^{5}	7	4
(Canada) J Hetherington (Australia) K Radford	7^{7}	5	6
10	(South Africa) E Reinach (Romania) I Spîrlea	2	3
7	(Spain) C Martínez (Argentina) P Tarabini	6	6

Quarterfinals
(Canada) J Hetherington (Australia) K Radford	4	7	7
7	(Spain) C Martínez (Argentina) P Tarabini	6	5	5

=== Bottom half ===
==== Section 3 ====
First round
5	(United States) N Arendt (Netherlands) M Bollegraf	6	6
(Italy) L Garrone (Slovakia) R Zrubáková	3	1
(Japan) K Nagatsuka (Japan) A Sugiyama	6	5	6
(United States) M Werdel-Witmeyer (United States) T Whitlinger-Jones	3	7	2
(Italy) S Farina (Slovakia) K Habšudová	1	2
(Germany) A Huber (Germany) C Singer	6	6
(United States) A Frazier (United States) K Po	6	3	5
9	(France) J Halard (France) N Tauziat	4	6	7
15	(United States) L McNeil (Czech Republic) H Suková	7	7^{8}
(Sweden) Å Carlsson (Hungary) A Temesvári	5	6^{6}
(Germany) K Kschwendt (Canada) R Simpson	6	6
(Ukraine) O Lugina (United Kingdom) C Wood	2	1
WC	(United States) K Rinaldi-Stunkel (United States) R White	6	7
WC	(United States) S Halsell (United States) L Osterloh	2	5
(Indonesia) Y Basuki (Netherlands) C Vis	5	6	1
4	(United States) L Davenport (United States) L Raymond	7	4	6

Second round
5	(United States) N Arendt (Netherlands) M Bollegraf	6	3	4
(Japan) K Nagatsuka (Japan) A Sugiyama	4	6	6
(Germany) A Huber (Germany) C Singer	6	3	2
9	(France) J Halard (France) N Tauziat	4	6	6
15	(United States) L McNeil (Czech Republic) H Suková	6	6
(Germany) K Kschwendt (Canada) R Simpson	1	3
WC	(United States) K Rinaldi-Stunkel (United States) R White	3	1
4	(United States) L Davenport (United States) L Raymond	6	6

Third round
(Japan) K Nagatsuka (Japan) A Sugiyama	3	3
9	(France) J Halard (France) N Tauziat	6	6
15	(United States) L McNeil (Czech Republic) H Suková	6	6
4	(United States) L Davenport (United States) L Raymond	0	2

Quarterfinals
9	(France) J Halard (France) N Tauziat	4	6	4
15	(United States) L McNeil (Czech Republic) H Suková	6	3	6

==== Section 4 ====
First round
8	(United States) M Navratilova (Argentina) G Sabatini	6	6
Q	(United States) S McCarthy (United States) J Steven	4	2
(Belgium) S Appelmans (Netherlands) M Oremans	2	1
(United States) C Rubin (United States) P Shriver	6	6
LL	(Spain) E Bottini (Spain) G León García	6	6
(Czech Republic) R Bobková (Netherlands) M Koutstaal	3	4
Q	(Austria) B Schett (Austria) M Schnell	6	4
12	(United States) K Adams (United States) Z Garrison-Jackson	7	6
13	(Switzerland) M Hingis (Croatia) I Majoli	6	7
(South Africa) L Horn (Belgium) D Monami	4	5
Q	(United States) J Lee (United States) L Lee	6^{2}	1
(France) A Fusai (Australia) K-A Guse	7^{7}	6
(Finland) N Dahlman (Russia) E Likhovtseva	6	3	6^{4}
(Japan) Y Kamio (Japan) N Kijimuta	2	6	7^{7}
(Italy) F Perfetti (Italy) G Pizzichini	1	0
2	(United States) G Fernández (Belarus) N Zvereva	6	6

Second round
8	(United States) M Navratilova (Argentina) G Sabatini	3	5
(United States) C Rubin (United States) P Shriver	6	7
LL	(Spain) E Bottini (Spain) G León García	6	1	4
12	(United States) K Adams (United States) Z Garrison-Jackson	3	6	6
13	(Switzerland) M Hingis (Croatia) I Majoli	6	6
(France) A Fusai (Australia) K-A Guse	4	3
(Japan) Y Kamio (Japan) N Kijimuta	2	0
2	(United States) G Fernández (Belarus) N Zvereva	6	6

Third round
(United States) C Rubin (United States) P Shriver	7	6
12	(United States) K Adams (United States) Z Garrison-Jackson	5	4
13	(Switzerland) M Hingis (Croatia) I Majoli	4	3
2	(United States) G Fernández (Belarus) N Zvereva	6	6

Quarterfinals
(United States) C Rubin (United States) P Shriver	7	1	3
2	(United States) G Fernández (Belarus) N Zvereva	5	6	6
