= 1995 US Open (tennis) =

- Date: August 28 – September 10
- Edition: 115th
- Category: Grand Slam (ITF)
- Surface: Hardcourt
- Location: New York City, New York, United States

Champions

Men's singles
- (United States) Pete Sampras

Women's singles
- (Germany) Steffi Graf

Men's doubles
- (Australia) Todd Woodbridge / (Australia) Mark Woodforde

Women's doubles
- (United States) Gigi Fernández / (Belarus) Natasha Zvereva

Mixed doubles
- (United States) Meredith McGrath / (United States) Matt Lucena

Boys' singles
- (Germany) Nicolas Kiefer

Girls' singles
- (United States) Tara Snyder

Boys' doubles
- (South Korea) Jong-Min Lee / (Canada) Jocelyn Robichaud

Girls' doubles
- (United States) Corina Morariu / (Czech Republic) Ludmila Varmužová
← 1994 ·	US Open	· 1996 →

The 1995 US Open was a tennis tournament played on outdoor hard courts at the USTA National Tennis Center in New York City in New York in the United States. It was the 115th edition of the US Open and was held from August 28 to September 10, 1995.

== Seniors ==
=== Men's singles ===
(United States) Pete Sampras defeated (United States) Andre Agassi 6–4, 6–3, 4–6, 7–5

- It was Sampras' 7th career Grand Slam title and his 3rd US Open title.

=== Women's singles ===
(Germany) Steffi Graf defeated (United States) Monica Seles 7–6^{(8–6)}, 0–6, 6–3

- It was Graf's 18th career Grand Slam title and her 4th US Open title.

=== Men's doubles ===
(Australia) Todd Woodbridge / (Australia) Mark Woodforde defeated (United States) Alex O'Brien / (Australia) Sandon Stolle 6–3, 6–3

- It was Woodbridge's 10th career Grand Slam title and his 1st US Open title. It was Woodforde's 10th career Grand Slam title and his 1st US Open title.

=== Women's doubles ===
(United States) Gigi Fernández / (Belarus) Natasha Zvereva defeated (Netherlands) Brenda Schultz-McCarthy / (Australia) Rennae Stubbs 7–5, 6–3

- It was Fernández's 14th career Grand Slam title and her 4th US Open title. It was Zvereva's 16th career Grand Slam title and her 3rd US Open title.

=== Mixed doubles ===
(United States) Meredith McGrath / (United States) Matt Lucena defeated (United States) Gigi Fernández / (Czech Republic) Cyril Suk 6–4, 6–4

- It was McGrath's only career Grand Slam title. It was Lucena's only career Grand Slam title.

== Juniors ==
=== Boys' singles ===
(Germany) Nicolas Kiefer defeated (Germany) Ulrich Jasper Seetzen 6–3, 6–4

=== Girls' singles ===
(United States) Tara Snyder defeated (Australia) Annabel Ellwood 6–4, 4–6, 6–2

=== Boys' doubles ===
(South Korea) Jong-Min Lee / (Canada) Jocelyn Robichaud defeated (Netherlands) Raemon Sluiter / (Netherlands) Peter Wessels 7–6, 6–2

=== Girls' doubles ===
(United States) Corina Morariu / (Czech Republic) Ludmila Varmužová defeated (Russia) Anna Kournikova / (Poland) Aleksandra Olsza 6–3, 6–3

Preceded by 1995 Wimbledon Championships	Grand Slams	Succeeded by 1996 Australian Open
