= 1996 Wimbledon Championships – Boys' doubles =

Boys' doubles
- 1996 Wimbledon Championships

Final
- Champions: (Italy) Daniele Bracciali (Canada) Jocelyn Robichaud
- Runners-up: (South Africa) Damien Roberts (South Africa) Wesley Whitehouse
- Score: 6–2, 6–4

Events
Singles	men	women		boys	girls
Doubles	men	women	mixed	boys	girls
WC Singles	men	women	quad
WC Doubles	men	women	quad
Legends	men	women	seniors
← 1995 ·	Wimbledon Championships	· 1997 →

Martin Lee and James Trotman were the defending champions, but Trotman did not compete. Lee played with David Sherwood but lost in the semifinals to Damien Roberts and Wesley Whitehouse.

Daniele Bracciali and Jocelyn Robichaud defeated Roberts and Whitehouse in the final, 6–2, 6–4 to win the boys' doubles tennis title at the 1996 Wimbledon Championships.

== Seeds ==
1. (Italy) Daniele Bracciali / (Canada) Jocelyn Robichaud (champions)
2. (South Africa) Damien Roberts / (South Africa) Wesley Whitehouse (final)
3. (Switzerland) Yves Allegro / (France) Jean-Michel Pequery (quarterfinals)
4. (United Kingdom) Ben Haran / (United Kingdom) Simon Pender (semifinals)

== Draw ==
=== Key ===
- Q = Qualifier
- WC = Wild card
- LL = Lucky loser
- Alt = Alternate
- SE = Special exempt
- PR = Protected ranking
- ITF = ITF entry
- JE = Junior exempt
- w/o = Walkover
- r = Retired
- d = Defaulted
- SR = Special ranking

=== Draw ===
First round
1	(Italy) Daniele Bracciali (Canada) Jocelyn Robichaud
(Peru) Luis Horna (Thailand) Paradorn Srichaphan	w/o
(Venezuela) Yohny Romero (Mexico) Mariano Sánchez	3	6	10
(Brazil) Marcos Daniel (Czech Republic) Petr Kralert	6	3	8
4	(United Kingdom) Ben Haran (United Kingdom) Simon Pender	6	6
(South Korea) Kim Dong-hyun (South Korea) Lee Seung-hoon	3	4
(United States) Kevin Kim (United States) Michael Russell	6	6
(Switzerland) Michel Kratochvil (Argentina) Mariano Puerta	4	3
(United States) Geoff Abrams (United States) Bob Bryan	0	6
WC	(United Kingdom) Martin Lee (United Kingdom) David Sherwood	6	7
(Israel) Amir Hadad (Israel) Harel Levy	3	6
3	(Switzerland) Yves Allegro (France) Jean-Michel Pequery	6	7
(Australia) Jaymon Crabb (Australia) Sergio Gaoni	2	7	6
(Slovenia) Miha Gregorc (Hong Kong) John Hui	6	5	2
(United States) Alex Kim (Peru) Rodolfo Rake	6	2
2	(South Africa) Damien Roberts (South Africa) Wesley Whitehouse	7	6

Quarterfinals
1	(Italy) Daniele Bracciali (Canada) Jocelyn Robichaud	6	7
(Venezuela) Yohny Romero (Mexico) Mariano Sánchez	1	5
4	(United Kingdom) Ben Haran (United Kingdom) Simon Pender	7	6
(United States) Kevin Kim (United States) Michael Russell	6	4
WC	(United Kingdom) Martin Lee (United Kingdom) David Sherwood	6	7
3	(Switzerland) Yves Allegro (France) Jean-Michel Pequery	4	5
(Australia) Jaymon Crabb (Australia) Sergio Gaoni	4	2
2	(South Africa) Damien Roberts (South Africa) Wesley Whitehouse	6	6

Semifinals
1	(Italy) Daniele Bracciali (Canada) Jocelyn Robichaud	6	6
4	(United Kingdom) Ben Haran (United Kingdom) Simon Pender	3	4
WC	(United Kingdom) Martin Lee (United Kingdom) David Sherwood	6	6
2	(South Africa) Damien Roberts (South Africa) Wesley Whitehouse	7	7

Final
1	(Italy) Daniele Bracciali (Canada) Jocelyn Robichaud	6	6
2	(South Africa) Damien Roberts (South Africa) Wesley Whitehouse	2	4
