= 1996 Wimbledon Championships – Boys' singles =

Boys' singles
- 1996 Wimbledon Championships

Final
- Champion: (Belarus) Vladimir Voltchkov
- Runner-up: (Croatia) Ivan Ljubičić
- Score: 3–6, 6–2, 6–3

Events
Singles	men	women		boys	girls
Doubles	men	women	mixed	boys	girls
WC Singles	men	women	quad
WC Doubles	men	women	quad
Legends	men	women	seniors
← 1995 ·	Wimbledon Championships	· 1997 →

Vladimir Voltchkov defeated Ivan Ljubičić in the final, 3–6, 6–2, 6–3 to win the boys' singles tennis title at the 1996 Wimbledon Championships.

== Seeds ==
1. (Czech Republic) Michal Tabara (first round)
2. (Netherlands) Peter Wessels (semifinals)
3. (France) Sébastien Grosjean (second round)
4. (Sweden) Björn Rehnquist (second round)
5. (Sweden) Mattias Hellström (first round)
6. (Belarus) Vladimir Voltchkov (champion)
7. (Israel) Amir Hadad (third round)
8. (United Kingdom) Martin Lee (quarterfinals)
9. (Peru) Rodolfo Rake (first round)
10. (France) Arnaud Di Pasquale (third round)
11. (Canada) Jocelyn Robichaud (third round)
12. (Brazil) Marcos Daniel (second round)
13. (Argentina) Mariano Puerta (second round)
14. (Italy) Daniele Bracciali (third round)
15. (Switzerland) Michel Kratochvil (first round)
16. (Thailand) Paradorn Srichaphan (quarterfinals)

Click on the seed number of a player to go to their draw section.

== Draw ==
=== Key ===
- Q = Qualifier
- WC = Wild card
- LL = Lucky loser
- Alt = Alternate
- SE = Special exempt
- PR = Protected ranking
- ITF = ITF entry
- JE = Junior exempt
- w/o = Walkover
- r = Retired
- d = Defaulted
- SR = Special ranking

=== Finals ===
Quarterfinals
(Chile) Nicolás Massú	5	6	6
6	(Belarus) Vladimir Voltchkov	7	2	8
(Germany) Jan-Ralph Brandt	6	3
(Australia) Jaymon Crabb	7	6
8	(United Kingdom) Martin Lee	5	4
(Croatia) Ivan Ljubičić	7	6
16	(Thailand) Paradorn Srichaphan	4	4
2	(Netherlands) Peter Wessels	6	6

Semifinals
6	(Belarus) Vladimir Voltchkov	6	1	6
(Australia) Jaymon Crabb	4	6	3
(Croatia) Ivan Ljubičić	7	6
2	(Netherlands) Peter Wessels	5	4

Final
6	(Belarus) Vladimir Voltchkov	3	6	6
(Croatia) Ivan Ljubičić	6	2	3

=== Top half ===
==== Section 1 ====
First round
1	(Czech Republic) Michal Tabara	3	6	5
(Chile) Nicolás Massú	6	5	7
(Slovenia) Miha Gregorc	3	2
(Philippines) Dante Santa-Cruz	6	6
(France) Rodolphe Cadart	7	6
(Venezuela) Yohny Romero	6	1
(United Kingdom) Arvind Parmar	6	6
9	(Peru) Rodolfo Rake	4	4
11	(Canada) Jocelyn Robichaud	4	6	7
(Switzerland) Yves Allegro	6	1	5
(Sweden) Marcus Sarstrand	7	6
(Israel) Harel Levy	6	4
(South Africa) Wesley Whitehouse	6	3
(United Kingdom) William Herbert	3	1^{r}
(Peru) Luis Horna	1	6
6	(Belarus) Vladimir Voltchkov	6	7

Second round
(Chile) N Massú	6	6
(Philippines) D Santa-Cruz	3	2
(France) R Cadart	6	6
(United Kingdom) A Parmar	1	4
11	(Canada) J Robichaud	6	7
(Sweden) M Sarstrand	3	5
(South Africa) W Whitehouse	3	4
6	(Belarus) V Voltchkov	6	6

Third round
(Chile) N Massú	7	6
(France) R Cadart	5	4
11	(Canada) J Robichaud	4	3
6	(Belarus) V Voltchkov	6	6

Quarterfinals
(Chile) N Massú	7	2	8
6	(Belarus) V Voltchkov	5	6	6

==== Section 2 ====
First round
3	(France) Sébastien Grosjean	6	6
(Thailand) Chai Navawongse	4	1
(Germany) Jan-Ralph Brandt	6	6
(South Korea) Lee Seung-hoon	1	2
(United Kingdom) Simon Pender	6	0	3
(United States) Geoff Abrams	1	6	6
(Croatia) Željko Krajan	4	5
14	(Italy) Daniele Bracciali	6	7
13	(Argentina) Mariano Puerta	6	6
(Hungary) Miklós Jancsó	2	2
(Australia) Jaymon Crabb	6	6
(Guatemala) Andrés Asturias	0	0
(United Kingdom) David Sherwood	6	7
(Morocco) Talal Ouahabi	2	6
(Mexico) Mariano Sánchez	6	6
5	(Sweden) Mattias Hellström	2	2

Second round
3	(France) S Grosjean	4	5
(Germany) J-R Brandt	6	7
(United States) G Abrams	4	3
14	(Italy) D Bracciali	6	6
13	(Argentina) M Puerta	4	4
(Australia) J Crabb	6	6
(United Kingdom) D Sherwood	4	2
(Mexico) M Sánchez	6	6

Third round
(Germany) J-R Brandt	6	5	7
14	(Italy) D Bracciali	4	7	5
(Australia) J Crabb	6	7
(Mexico) M Sánchez	1	5

Quarterfinals
(Germany) J-R Brandt	6	3
(Australia) J Crabb	7	6

=== Bottom half ===
==== Section 3 ====
First round
8	(United Kingdom) Martin Lee	6	6
(Hong Kong) John Hui	2	2
(South Korea) Kim Dong-hyun	6	7
(Federal Republic of Yugoslavia) Nikola Gnjatović	2	5
(Czech Republic) Robin Vik	6	6	7
(Hungary) Zoltán Böröczky	7	2	5
(Bosnia and Herzegovina) Kristian Capalik	4	3
10	(France) Arnaud Di Pasquale	6	6
12	(Brazil) Marcos Daniel	6	7
(Italy) Florian Allgauer	3	6
(United States) Alex Kim	4	6	6
(Germany) Benjamin Osterbrink	6	2	3
(Chile) Fernando González	1	4
(Croatia) Ivan Ljubičić	6	6
(Russia) Kirill Ivanov-Smolensky	4	3
4	(Sweden) Björn Rehnquist	6	6

Second round
8	(United Kingdom) M Lee	6	6
(South Korea) D-h Kim	2	4
(Czech Republic) R Vik	3	4
10	(France) A Di Pasquale	6	6
12	(Brazil) M Daniel	6	7	4
(United States) A Kim	7	6	6
(Croatia) I Ljubičić	7	6
4	(Sweden) B Rehnquist	5	4

Third round
8	(United Kingdom) M Lee	6	6
10	(France) A Di Pasquale	2	4
(United States) A Kim	6	5
(Croatia) I Ljubičić	7	7

Quarterfinals
8	(United Kingdom) M Lee	5	4
(Croatia) I Ljubičić	7	6

==== Section 4 ====
First round
7	(Israel) Amir Hadad	3	7	6
(Slovakia) Milan Turkovič	6	6	4
(United Kingdom) Simon Dickson	6	5
(United States) Kevin Kim	7	7
(Czech Republic) Petr Kralert	5	4
(South Africa) Damien Roberts	7	6
(India) Harsh Mankad	1	3
16	(Thailand) Paradorn Srichaphan	6	6
15	(Switzerland) Michel Kratochvil	0	6
(United States) Bob Bryan	6	7
(Italy) Dario Sciortino	7	2	2
(United States) Michael Russell	6	6	6
(France) Jean-Michel Pequery	6	6
(United Kingdom) Ben Haran	2	4
(Australia) Sergio Gaoni	2	2
2	(Netherlands) Peter Wessels	6	6

Second round
7	(Israel) A Hadad	4	7	6
(United States) K Kim	6	6	1
(South Africa) D Roberts	6	4
16	(Thailand) P Srichaphan	7	6
(United States) B Bryan	6	6
(United States) M Russell	4	3
(France) J-M Pequery	1	6	5
2	(Netherlands) P Wessels	6	4	7

Third round
7	(Israel) A Hadad	6	6	5
16	(Thailand) P Srichaphan	2	7	7
(United States) B Bryan	4	5
2	(Netherlands) P Wessels	6	7

Quarterfinals
16	(Thailand) P Srichaphan	4	4
2	(Netherlands) P Wessels	6	6
