= Jeff Belloli =

American tennis player (born 1970)

- Full name: Jeffrey R. Belloli
- Country (sports): United States
- Born: February 10, 1970 (age 55)
- Prize money: $55,843

Singles
- Highest ranking: No. 551 (November 2, 1992)

Doubles
- Career record: 9–17
- Highest ranking: No. 130 (July 8, 1996)

Grand Slam doubles results
- Wimbledon: 2R (1996)

Grand Slam mixed doubles results
- Wimbledon: 1R (1996)

Jeffrey Belloli (born February 10, 1970) is a former professional tennis player from the United States.

He grew up in Southern California and attended Servite High School. He and his fraternal twin brother Chris are the only children of Cal State chemistry professor Robert and his wife Shirley.

Prior to his career in professional tennis, Belloli played for San Diego State University in collegiate competition, where he earned NCAA All-American honors for doubles in 1991 and 1992.

On the professional circuit, Belloli competed most successfully in doubles, with a career high ranking of 130 in the world. His best ATP Tour performance was a semi-final appearance at the 1995 Swedish Open, partnering Mathias Huning. At the 1996 Wimbledon Championships he featured in the main draw of both the men's doubles and mixed doubles events. In the men's doubles he and partner Leander Paes made the second round.

He now works in human resources and is based in New York.
