= 1996 Wimbledon Championships – Girls' doubles =

Girls' doubles
- 1996 Wimbledon Championships

Final
- Champions: (Belarus) Olga Barabanschikova (France) Amélie Mauresmo
- Runners-up: (United States) Lilia Osterloh (United States) Samantha Reeves
- Score: 5–7, 6–3, 6–1

Events
Singles	men	women		boys	girls
Doubles	men	women	mixed	boys	girls
WC Singles	men	women	quad
WC Doubles	men	women	quad
Legends	men	women	seniors
← 1995 ·	Wimbledon Championships	· 1997 →

Cara Black and Aleksandra Olsza were the defending champions, but Olsza did not compete. Black played with Surina de Beer but lost in the quarterfinals to Lilia Osterloh and Samantha Reeves.

Olga Barabanschikova and Amélie Mauresmo defeated Osterloh and Reeves in the final, 5–7, 6–3, 6–1,420-69 to win the girls' doubles tennis title at the 1996 Wimbledon Championships.

== Seeds ==
1. (Italy) Giulia Casoni / (Sweden) Kristina Triska (first round)
2. (Czech Republic) Michaela Paštiková / (Czech Republic) Jitka Schönfeldová (semifinals)
3. (United States) Lilia Osterloh / (United States) Samantha Reeves (final)
4. (Australia) Amy Jensen / (Hungary) Anita Kurimay (first round)

== Draw ==
=== Key ===
- Q = Qualifier
- WC = Wild card
- LL = Lucky loser
- Alt = Alternate
- SE = Special exempt
- PR = Protected ranking
- ITF = ITF entry
- JE = Junior exempt
- w/o = Walkover
- r = Retired
- d = Defaulted
- SR = Special ranking

=== Draw ===
First round
1	(Italy) Giulia Casoni (Sweden) Kristina Triska	7	3	4
(United Kingdom) Jasmine Choudhury (United Kingdom) Louise Latimer	5	6	6
(Belarus) Olga Barabanschikova (France) Amélie Mauresmo	6	6
(Australia) Siobhan Drake-Brockman (South Africa) Jessica Steck	0	3
4	(Australia) Amy Jensen (Hungary) Anita Kurimay	1	5
(United States) Brie Rippner (United States) Mary White	6	7
(Hungary) Katalin Marosi (Spain) Magüi Serna	w/o
(Croatia) Ana Radeljević (Slovakia) Zuzana Váleková
(Slovakia) Silvia Uricková (Slovakia) Gabriela Voleková	2	2
(Zimbabwe) Cara Black (South Africa) Surina de Beer	6	6
(United Kingdom) Jheni Osman (United Kingdom) Katia Roubanova	6	1
3	(United States) Lilia Osterloh (United States) Samantha Reeves	7	6
(France) Nathalie Dechy (France) Anne-Gaëlle Sidot	4	6	2
(Poland) Magdalena Grzybowska (Czech Republic) Sandra Kleinová	6	4	6
(Indonesia) Liza Andriyani (Slovenia) Katarina Srebotnik	4	4
2	(Czech Republic) Michaela Paštiková (Czech Republic) Jitka Schönfeldová	6	6

Quarterfinals
(United Kingdom) Jasmine Choudhury (United Kingdom) Louise Latimer	1	4
(Belarus) Olga Barabanschikova (France) Amélie Mauresmo	6	6
(United States) Brie Rippner (United States) Mary White	7	6
(Croatia) Ana Radeljević (Slovakia) Zuzana Váleková	6	1
(Zimbabwe) Cara Black (South Africa) Surina de Beer	2	6
3	(United States) Lilia Osterloh (United States) Samantha Reeves	6	7
(Poland) Magdalena Grzybowska (Czech Republic) Sandra Kleinová	4	6	2
2	(Czech Republic) Michaela Paštiková (Czech Republic) Jitka Schönfeldová	6	2	6

Semifinals
(Belarus) Olga Barabanschikova (France) Amélie Mauresmo	7	6
(United States) Brie Rippner (United States) Mary White	5	3
3	(United States) Lilia Osterloh (United States) Samantha Reeves	6	6
2	(Czech Republic) Michaela Paštiková (Czech Republic) Jitka Schönfeldová	3	3

Final
(Belarus) Olga Barabanschikova (France) Amélie Mauresmo	5	6	6
3	(United States) Lilia Osterloh (United States) Samantha Reeves	7	3	1
