= 1996 Wimbledon Championships – Girls' singles =

Girls' singles
- 1996 Wimbledon Championships

Final
- Champion: (France) Amélie Mauresmo
- Runner-up: (Spain) Magüi Serna
- Score: 4–6, 6–3, 6–4

Events
Singles	men	women		boys	girls
Doubles	men	women	mixed	boys	girls
WC Singles	men	women	quad
WC Doubles	men	women	quad
Legends	men	women	seniors
← 1995 ·	Wimbledon Championships	· 1997 →

Amélie Mauresmo defeated Magüi Serna in the final, 4–6, 6–3, 6–4 to win the girls' singles tennis title at the 1996 Wimbledon Championships.

== Seeds ==
1. (Poland) Magdalena Grzybowska (quarterfinals)
2. (Switzerland) Patty Schnyder (second round)
3. (France) Nathalie Dechy (semifinals)
4. (Czech Republic) Sandra Kleinová (second round)
5. (France) Anne-Gaëlle Sidot (semifinals)
6. (Australia) Annabel Ellwood (third round)
7. (France) Amélie Cocheteux (third round)
8. (Australia) Siobhan Drake-Brockman (second round)
9. (South Korea) Jeon Mi-ra (quarterfinals)
10. (France) Amélie Mauresmo (champion)
11. (Belarus) Olga Barabanschikova (quarterfinals)
12. (Croatia) Mirjana Lučić (third round)
13. (United States) Lilia Osterloh (first round)
14. (Czech Republic) Jitka Schönfeldová (second round)
15. (Colombia) Fabiola Zuluaga (first round)
16. (Hungary) Zsófia Gubacsi (second round)

Click on the seed number of a player to go to their draw section.

== Draw ==
=== Key ===
- Q = Qualifier
- WC = Wild card
- LL = Lucky loser
- Alt = Alternate
- SE = Special exempt
- PR = Protected ranking
- ITF = ITF entry
- JE = Junior exempt
- w/o = Walkover
- r = Retired
- d = Defaulted
- SR = Special ranking

=== Finals ===
Quarterfinals
1	(Poland) Magdalena Grzybowska	2	4
10	(France) Amélie Mauresmo	6	6
11	(Belarus) Olga Barabanschikova	7	5	1
5	(France) Anne-Gaëlle Sidot	6	7	6
(United States) Samantha Reeves	3	5
3	(France) Nathalie Dechy	6	7
(Spain) Magüi Serna	6	6	6
9	(South Korea) Jeon Mi-ra	4	7	2

Semifinals
10	(France) Amélie Mauresmo	6	6
5	(France) Anne-Gaëlle Sidot	4	3
3	(France) Nathalie Dechy	6	1
(Spain) Magüi Serna	7	6

Final
10	(France) Amélie Mauresmo	4	6	6
(Spain) Magüi Serna	6	3	4

=== Top half ===
==== Section 1 ====
First round
1	(Poland) Magdalena Grzybowska	6	6
(United States) Brie Rippner	4	2
(Federal Republic of Yugoslavia) Sandra Načuk	2	2
(Germany) Jasmin Wöhr	6	6
(Czech Republic) Nikola Hübnerová	3	4
(Russia) Evgenia Kulikovskaya	6	6
(United Kingdom) Lydia Perkins	0	2
12	(Croatia) Mirjana Lučić	6	6
10	(France) Amélie Mauresmo	6	6
(Japan) Maiko Inoue	2	3
(South Korea) Cho Yoon-jeong	7	6
(Slovakia) Andrea Šebová	5	2
(Colombia) Catalina Castaño	3	2
(South Africa) Jessica Steck	6	6
(Peru) Déborah Gaviria	1	2
8	(Australia) Siobhan Drake-Brockman	6	6

Second round
1	(Poland) M Grzybowska	6	3	6
(Germany) J Wöhr	3	6	2
(Russia) E Kulikovskaya	6	4
12	(Croatia) M Lučić	7	6
10	(France) A Mauresmo	6	6
(South Korea) Y-j Cho	4	2
(South Africa) J Steck	6	6
8	(Australia) S Drake-Brockman	3	4

Third round
1	(Poland) M Grzybowska	6	4	7
12	(Croatia) M Lučić	4	6	5
10	(France) A Mauresmo	6	6
(South Africa) J Steck	3	3

Quarterfinals
1	(Poland) M Grzybowska	2	4
10	(France) A Mauresmo	6	6

==== Section 2 ====
First round
4	(Czech Republic) Sandra Kleinová	6	6
(Canada) Aneta Soukup	1	4
(United Kingdom) Amanda Janes	6	6
(Japan) Keiko Tokuda	4	3
(France) Karolina Jagieniak	6	6
(Republic of Ireland) Claire Curran	1	1
(Slovakia) Silvia Uricková	1	3
11	(Belarus) Olga Barabanschikova	6	6
16	(Hungary) Zsófia Gubacsi	0	6	6
(Italy) Giulia Casoni	6	3	2
(United Kingdom) Louise Latimer	6	7
(Switzerland) Andrea Schwarz	1	6
(Zimbabwe) Cara Black	3	6	6
(United States) Mary White	6	0	0
(Paraguay) Laura Bernal	1	0
5	(France) Anne-Gaëlle Sidot	6	6

Second round
4	(Czech Republic) S Kleinová	2	1
(United Kingdom) A Janes	6	6
(France) K Jagieniak	4	2
11	(Belarus) O Barabanschikova	6	6
16	(Hungary) Z Gubacsi	4	4
(United Kingdom) L Latimer	6	6
(Zimbabwe) C Black	2	7	1
5	(France) A-G Sidot	6	5	6

Third round
(United Kingdom) A Janes	2	0
11	(Belarus) O Barabanschikova	6	6
(United Kingdom) L Latimer	3	0
5	(France) A-G Sidot	6	6

Quarterfinals
11	(Belarus) O Barabanschikova	7	5	1
5	(France) A-G Sidot	6	7	6

=== Bottom half ===
==== Section 3 ====
First round
6	(Australia) Annabel Ellwood	5	6	6
(Slovakia) Gabriela Voleková	7	4	3
(United Kingdom) Jasmine Choudhury	5	4
(Japan) Akiko Morigami	7	6
(South Africa) Surina de Beer	6	6
(Croatia) Ana Radeljević	4	2
(United States) Samantha Reeves	6	3	7
15	(Colombia) Fabiola Zuluaga	4	6	5
14	(Czech Republic) Jitka Schönfeldová	7	6
(Mexico) Paola Palencia	5	4
(Germany) Stephanie Kovacic	6	3	0
(United Kingdom) Katia Roubanova	1	6	6
(Canada) Cristina Popescu	0	6
(Hungary) Katalin Marosi	6	7
(Sweden) Kristina Triska	6	3	3
3	(France) Nathalie Dechy	4	6	6

Second round
6	(Australia) A Ellwood	6	6
(Japan) A Morigami	4	3
(South Africa) S de Beer	4	3
(United States) S Reeves	6	6
14	(Czech Republic) J Schönfeldová	2	6	6
(United Kingdom) K Roubanova	6	0	8
(Hungary) K Marosi	0	2
3	(France) N Dechy	6	6

Third round
6	(Australia) A Ellwood	6	6	2
(United States) S Reeves	7	1	6
(United Kingdom) K Roubanova	3	1
3	(France) N Dechy	6	6

Quarterfinals
(United States) S Reeves	3	5
3	(France) N Dechy	6	7

==== Section 4 ====
First round
7	(France) Amélie Cocheteux	6	6
(Israel) Rotem Teperberg	3	2
(Belarus) Tatiana Poutchek	6	7
(Slovenia) Katarina Srebotnik	4	5
(Croatia) Marijana Kovačević	4	4
(Poland) Katarzyna Strączy	6	6
(Spain) Magüi Serna	6	6
13	(United States) Lilia Osterloh	4	2
9	(South Korea) Jeon Mi-ra	6	6
(Czech Republic) Zuzana Ondrášková	2	1
(Kazakhstan) Irina Selyutina	2	1
(United Kingdom) Abigail Tordoff	6	6
(Slovakia) Zuzana Váleková	6	6
(United States) Jessica Lehnhoff	1	2
(Romania) Raluca Sandu	2	0
2	(Switzerland) Patty Schnyder	6	6

Second round
7	(France) A Cocheteux	6	6
(Belarus) T Poutchek	2	4
(Poland) K Strączy	2	2
(Spain) M Serna	6	6
9	(South Korea) M-r Jeon	6	6
(United Kingdom) A Tordoff	2	3
(Slovakia) Z Váleková	6	7
2	(Switzerland) P Schnyder	4	5

Third round
7	(France) A Cocheteux	2	6
(Spain) M Serna	6	7
9	(South Korea) M-r Jeon	6	3	6
(Slovakia) Z Váleková	1	6	2

Quarterfinals
(Spain) M Serna	6	6	6
9	(South Korea) M-r Jeon	4	7	2
