= Peter Tramacchi =

Australian tennis player

- Country (sports): Australia
- Residence: Sunshine Coast, Queensland, Australia
- Born: 8 November 1970 (age 54); Gympie, Queensland, Australia
- Height: 6 ft 1 in (185 cm)
- Turned pro: 1992
- Plays: Right-handed (twp-handed backhand)
- Prize money: $526,544

Singles
- Career record: 5–16
- Career titles: 0
- Highest ranking: No. 127 (4 May 1998)

Grand Slam singles results
- Australian Open: 2R (1996, 1997)
- French Open: Q2 (1998)
- Wimbledon: 1R (1995, 1996)
- US Open: 1R (1996)

Doubles
- Career record: 57–93
- Career titles: 1
- Highest ranking: No. 45 (22 February 1999)

Grand Slam doubles results
- Australian Open: 3R (1995, 1996)
- French Open: 2R (2000)
- Wimbledon: 2R (1995, 1999, 2001)
- US Open: 2R (1999)

Grand Slam mixed doubles results
- Australian Open: QF (2001)
- French Open: 2R (1999)
- Wimbledon: 2R (1996, 1999)
- Last updated on: 26 November 2021.

Peter Tramacchi (born 8 November 1970 in Gympie, Queensland, Australia), is a former professional tennis player from Australia.

Tramacchi enjoyed most of his tennis success while playing doubles. During his career he won 1 doubles title. He achieved a career-high doubles ranking of World No. 45 in 1999.

Peter Tramacchi interviews other champion tennis players and teaches tennis online.

== Performance timelines ==
Key
W	F	SF	QF	#R	RR	Q#	DNQ	A	NH

(W) winner; (F) finalist; (SF) semifinalist; (QF) quarterfinalist; (#R) rounds 4, 3, 2, 1; (RR) round-robin stage; (Q#) qualification round; (DNQ) did not qualify; (A) absent; (NH) not held; (SR) strike rate (events won / competed); (W–L) win–loss record.

=== Singles ===
Tournament	1989	1990	1991	1992	1993	1994	1995	1996	1997	1998	1999	2000	SR	W–L	Win %
Grand Slam tournaments
Australian Open	Q1	A	Q2	Q1	Q2	Q1	Q2	2R	2R	1R	A	A	0 / 3	2–3	40%
French Open	A	A	A	A	A	Q1	Q1	Q1	A	Q2	A	A	0 / 0	0–0	–
Wimbledon	A	A	A	A	A	Q2	1R	1R	Q3	Q3	Q1	A	0 / 2	0–2	0%
US Open	A	A	A	A	A	Q1	Q2	1R	Q1	Q1	A	A	0 / 1	0–1	0%
Win–loss	0–0	0–0	0–0	0–0	0–0	0–0	0–1	1–3	1–1	0–1	0–0	0–0	0 / 6	2–6	25%
ATP Masters Series
Indian Wells	A	A	A	A	A	A	A	Q1	A	A	A	A	0 / 0	0–0	–
Miami	A	A	A	A	A	A	A	2R	A	Q1	A	A	0 / 1	1–1	50%
Hamburg	A	A	A	A	A	A	Q1	A	A	A	A	A	0 / 0	0–0	–
Canada	A	A	A	A	A	A	A	A	A	A	A	1R	0 / 1	0–1	0%
Win–loss	0–0	0–0	0–0	0–0	0–0	0–0	0–0	1–1	0–0	0–0	0–0	0–1	0 / 2	1–2	33%

=== Doubles ===
Tournament	1992	1993	1994	1995	1996	1997	1998	1999	2000	2001	SR	W–L	Win %
Grand Slam tournaments
Australian Open	2R	A	1R	3R	3R	1R	1R	2R	2R	1R	0 / 9	7–9	44%
French Open	A	A	A	A	1R	A	A	1R	2R	1R	0 / 4	1–4	20%
Wimbledon	A	A	A	2R	1R	1R	1R	2R	1R	2R	0 / 7	3–7	30%
US Open	A	A	A	1R	Q1	1R	1R	2R	1R	A	0 / 5	1–5	17%
Win–loss	1–1	0–0	0–1	3–3	2–3	0–3	0–3	3–4	2–4	1–3	0 / 25	12–25	32%
ATP Masters Series
Indian Wells	A	A	A	A	A	A	A	2R	Q2	A	0 / 1	1–1	50%
Miami	A	A	A	A	2R	A	2R	A	1R	A	0 / 3	1–3	25%
Monte Carlo	A	A	A	A	A	A	A	1R	A	A	0 / 1	0–1	0%
Hamburg	A	A	A	1R	A	A	A	1R	A	A	0 / 2	0–2	0%
Rome	A	A	A	A	A	A	A	2R	A	A	0 / 1	1–1	50%
Canada	A	A	A	A	A	A	A	A	2R	A	0 / 1	1–1	50%
Cincinnati	A	A	A	A	A	A	A	A	2R	A	0 / 1	1–1	50%
Stuttgart	A	A	A	A	A	A	A	Q1	A	A	0 / 0	0–0	–
Paris	A	A	A	A	A	A	A	1R	A	A	0 / 1	0–1	0%
Win–loss	0–0	0–0	0–0	0–1	1–1	0–0	0–1	2–5	2–3	0–0	0 / 11	5–11	31%

=== Mixed doubles ===
Tournament	1996	1997	1998	1999	2000	2001	SR	W–L	Win %
Grand Slam tournaments
Australian Open	A	A	A	2R	2R	QF	0 / 3	4–3	57%
French Open	1R	A	A	2R	1R	A	0 / 3	0–3	0%
Wimbledon	2R	A	1R	2R	1R	A	0 / 4	2–4	33%
US Open	A	A	A	A	A	A	0 / 0	0–0	–
Win–loss	1–2	0–0	0–1	2–3	1–3	2–1	0 / 10	6–10	38%

== ATP career finals ==
=== Doubles: 3 (1 title, 2 runner-ups) ===
Legend Grand Slam Tournaments (0–0) ATP World Tour Finals (0–0) ATP Masters Series(0–0) ATP Championship Series (1–1) ATP World Series (0–1)	Finals by surface Hard (1–1) Clay (0–0) Grass (0–0) Carpet (0–1)	Finals by setting Outdoors (1–1) Indoors (0–1)

Result	W–L	Date	Tournament	Tier	Surface	Partner	Opponents	Score
Win	1–0	Aug 1998	New Haven, United States	Championship Series	Hard	(Australia) Wayne Arthurs	(Canada) Sébastien Lareau (United States) Alex O'Brien	7–6, 1–6, 6–3
Loss	1–1	Feb 1999	Rotterdam, Netherlands	Championship Series	Carpet	(United Kingdom) Neil Broad	(South Africa) David Adams (South Africa) John-Laffnie de Jager	7–6^{(7–5)}, 3–6, 4–6
Loss	1–2	Feb 2000	Dubai, United Arab Emirates	International Series	Hard	(South Africa) Robbie Koenig	(Czech Republic) Jiří Novák (Czech Republic) David Rikl	2–6, 5–7

== ATP Challenger and ITF Futures Finals ==
=== Singles: 5 (3–2) ===
Legend ATP Challenger (3–2) ITF Futures (0–0)	Finals by surface Hard (1–1) Clay (1–0) Grass (1–1) Carpet (0–0)

Result	W–L	Date	Tournament	Tier	Surface	Opponent	Score
Loss	0–1	Dec 1993	Adelaide, Australia	Challenger	Grass	(United Kingdom) Mark Petchey	3–6, 2–6
Loss	0–2	Apr 1996	Nagoya, Japan	Challenger	Hard	(South Africa) Kevin Ullyett	6–3, 2–6, 3–6
Win	1–2	Oct 1997	Seoul, South Korea	Challenger	Clay	(France) Régis Lavergne	6–3, 6–3
Win	2–2	Nov 1997	Amarillo, United States	Challenger	Hard	(Finland) Tuomas Ketola	6–4, 5–7, 6–3
Win	3–2	Apr 1998	Vadodara, India	Challenger	Grass	(France) Antony Dupuis	7–6, 6–7, 6–3

=== Doubles: 14 (7–7) ===
Legend ATP Challenger (7–5) ITF Futures (0–2)	Finals by surface Hard (4–4) Clay (2–1) Grass (1–2) Carpet (0–0)

Result	W–L	Date	Tournament	Tier	Surface	Partner	Opponents	Score
Loss	0–1	Dec 1994	Adelaide, Australia	Challenger	Grass	(Australia) Scott Draper	(India) Mahesh Bhupathi (Belgium) Dick Norman	6–7, 6–7
Loss	0–2	Mar 1996	Indian Wells, United States	Challenger	Hard	(Australia) Jason Stoltenberg	(United States) Brett Hansen-Dent (United States) Brian Macphie	3–6, 4–6
Loss	0–3	Apr 1996	Nagoya, Japan	Challenger	Hard	(Australia) Ben Ellwood	(Japan) Satoshi Iwabuchi (Japan) Takao Suzuki	6–7, 6–7
Win	1–3	Sep 1996	Beijing, China	Challenger	Hard	(India) Mahesh Bhupathi	(Israel) Nir Welgreen (Argentina) Andres Zingman	6–2, 6–3
Win	2–3	Mar 1998	Ho Chi Minh City, Vietnam	Challenger	Hard	(India) Mahesh Bhupathi	(Belarus) Max Mirnyi (South Africa) Kevin Ullyett	6–4, 6–0
Win	3–3	Mar 1998	Bangkok, Thailand	Challenger	Hard	(South Africa) Kevin Ullyett	(Hungary) Gábor Köves (Hungary) Attila Sávolt	6–4, 6–3
Loss	3–4	Apr 1998	Vadodara, India	Challenger	Grass	(Belarus) Max Mirnyi	(South Africa) Myles Wakefield (South Africa) Wesley Whitehouse	6–7, 6–7
Win	4–4	Jun 1998	Surbiton, United Kingdom	Challenger	Grass	(Australia) Sandon Stolle	(The Bahamas) Mark Merklein (United States) Michael Sell	4–6, 7–6^{(7–3)}, 6–4
Win	5–4	Nov 1998	Rancho Mirage, United States	Challenger	Hard	(Australia) Wayne Arthurs	(Australia) Grant Silcock (Australia) Todd Larkham	6–3, 3–6, 6–3
Win	6–4	May 2000	Birmingham, United States	Challenger	Clay	(Australia) Paul Kilderry	(Australia) Grant Silcock (Australia) Lee Pearson	6–4, 6–4
Win	7–4	May 2000	Armonk, United States	Challenger	Clay	(Australia) Paul Kilderry	(United States) Bob Bryan (United States) Mike Bryan	2–6, 7–6^{(7–5)}, 6–4
Loss	7–5	Apr 2001	Australia F2, Brisbane	Futures	Hard	(Australia) Jaymon Crabb	(Australia) Todd Larkham (Australia) Todd Perry	4–6, 6–7^{(3–7)}
Loss	7–6	May 2001	Rocky Mount, United States	Challenger	Clay	(Australia) Paul Kilderry	(The Bahamas) Mark Merklein (United States) Mitch Sprengelmeyer	5–7, 6–7^{(7–9)}
Loss	7–7	Feb 2005	Australia F2, Gosford	Futures	Hard	(Australia) Brodie Stewart	(Australia) Sadik Kadir (Australia) Robert Smeets	4–6, 3–6
