= 1996 Wimbledon Championships – Mixed doubles =

Mixed doubles
- 1996 Wimbledon Championships

Final
- Champions: (Czech Republic) Cyril Suk (Czech Republic) Helena Suková
- Runners-up: (Australia) Mark Woodforde (Latvia) Larisa Neiland
- Score: 1–6, 6–3, 6–2

Details
- Draw: 64 (5WC)
- Seeds: 16

Events
Singles	men	women		boys	girls
Doubles	men	women	mixed	boys	girls
WC Singles	men	women	quad
WC Doubles	men	women	quad
Legends	men	women	seniors
- Wimbledon Championships

Jonathan Stark and Martina Navratilova were the defending champions but lost in the quarterfinals to Grant Connell and Lindsay Davenport.

Cyril Suk and Helena Suková defeated Mark Woodforde and Larisa Neiland in the final, 1–6, 6–3, 6–2 to win the mixed doubles tennis title at the 1996 Wimbledon Championships.

== Seeds ==
1. (Australia) Mark Woodforde / (Latvia) Larisa Neiland (final)
2. (Canada) Grant Connell / (United States) Lindsay Davenport (semifinals)
3. (The Bahamas) Mark Knowles / (United States) Lisa Raymond (first round)
4. (United States) Rick Leach / (Netherlands) Manon Bollegraf (first round)
5. (United States) Jonathan Stark / (United States) Martina Navratilova (quarterfinals)
6. n/a
7. (Czech Republic) Cyril Suk / (Czech Republic) Helena Suková (champions)
8. (United States) Patrick Galbraith / (United States) Pam Shriver (quarterfinals)
9. (South Africa) Ellis Ferreira / (South Africa) Mariaan de Swardt (first round)
10. (Russia) Andrei Olhovskiy / (Netherlands) Kristie Boogert (second round)
11. (Belgium) Libor Pimek / (United States) Katrina Adams (first round)
12. (United States) Mark Keil / (United States) Lori McNeil (third round)
13. (United States) Jim Grabb / (United States) Linda Wild (second round)
14. (South Africa) Byron Talbot / (Netherlands) Caroline Vis (first round)
15. (Switzerland) Heinz Günthardt / (Germany) Steffi Graf (second round)
16. n/a

Click on the seed number of a player to go to their draw section.

== Draw ==
Key

- Q = Qualifier
- WC = Wild card
- LL = Lucky loser
- Alt = Alternate
- ITF = ITF entry
- PR = Protected ranking
- SR = Special ranking
- SE = Special exempt
- JE = Junior exempt
- JR = Junior Accelerator Programme entrant
- CO = College Accelerator Programme entrant
- NG = Next Gen Accelerator Program entrant
- w/o = Walkover
- r = Retired
- d = Defaulted

=== Finals ===
Quarterfinals
1	(Australia) Mark Woodforde (Latvia) Larisa Neiland	3	6	7
8	(United States) Patrick Galbraith (United States) Pam Shriver	6	2	5
(Sweden) Rikard Bergh (United States) Kimberly Po	4	4
(South Africa) Christo van Rensburg (Italy) Laura Golarsa	6	6
7	(Czech Republic) Cyril Suk (Czech Republic) Helena Suková	6	2	10
(United States) Luke Jensen (United States) Nicole Arendt	3	6	8
5/ WC	(United States) Jonathan Stark (United States) Martina Navratilova	6^{5}	6^{2}
2	(Canada) Grant Connell (United States) Lindsay Davenport	7^{7}	7^{7}

Semifinals
1	(Australia) Mark Woodforde (Latvia) Larisa Neiland	6	3	6
(South Africa) Christo van Rensburg (Italy) Laura Golarsa	3	6	2
7	(Czech Republic) Cyril Suk (Czech Republic) Helena Suková	6	6
2	(Canada) Grant Connell (United States) Lindsay Davenport	4	2

Final
1	(Australia) Mark Woodforde (Latvia) Larisa Neiland	6	3	2
7	(Czech Republic) Cyril Suk (Czech Republic) Helena Suková	1	6	6

=== Top half ===
==== Section 1 ====
First round
1	(Australia) M Woodforde (Latvia) L Neiland	6	3	10
(South Africa) B Haygarth (Germany) C Singer	4	6	8
(United States) K Flach (South Africa) R Nideffer	6	7^{7}
(South Africa) P Norval (Greece) C Papadáki	3	6^{5}
WC	(United Kingdom) J Bates (Australia) N Bradtke	6	6
(Hungary) G Köves (Hungary) A Temesvári	1	3
(Germany) M Huning (United States) D Graham	5	6^{9}
13	(United States) J Grabb (United States) L Wild	7	7^{11}
Alt	(Spain) JA Conde (Spain) V Ruano-Pascual	6	4	5
(Australia) J Eagle (Australia) A Ellwood	3	6	7
(United States) S Davis (Argentina) P Tarabini	6	4	6
(United States) G Van Emburgh (Romania) I Spîrlea	3	6	3
(United States) B MacPhie (United States) T Whitlinger-Jones	7^{8}	6
(United States) S Cannon (Canada) P Hy-Boulais	6^{6}	1
(Australia) M Tebbutt (Australia) K Radford	6^{2}	3
8	(United States) P Galbraith (United States) P Shriver	7^{7}	6

Second round
1	(Australia) M Woodforde (Latvia) L Neiland
(United States) K Flach (South Africa) R Nideffer	w/o
WC	(United Kingdom) J Bates (Australia) N Bradtke	6^{3}	6	6
13	(United States) J Grabb (United States) L Wild	7^{7}	3	0
(Australia) J Eagle (Australia) A Ellwood	7^{7}	6
(United States) S Davis (Argentina) P Tarabini	6^{1}	2
(United States) B MacPhie (United States) T Whitlinger-Jones	4	4
8	(United States) P Galbraith (United States) P Shriver	6	6

Third round
1	(Australia) M Woodforde (Latvia) L Neiland	6	6
WC	(United Kingdom) J Bates (Australia) N Bradtke	4	4
(Australia) J Eagle (Australia) A Ellwood	2	4
8	(United States) P Galbraith (United States) P Shriver	6	6

Quarterfinals
1	(Australia) M Woodforde (Latvia) L Neiland	3	6	7
8	(United States) P Galbraith (United States) P Shriver	6	2	5

==== Section 2 ====
First round
3	(The Bahamas) M Knowles (United States) L Raymond	4	6	3
(Sweden) R Bergh (United States) K Po	6	3	6
(Australia) W Arthurs (Australia) K Godridge	6^{2}	7^{7}	4
(South Africa) D Adams (Australia) K-A Guse	7^{7}	6^{5}	6
(Netherlands) M Oosting (Belgium) E Callens	6	6
(South Africa) L Bale (Indonesia) Y Basuki	4	4
WC	(Australia) P Cash (France) M Pierce	6	6
11	(Belgium) L Pimek (United States) K Adams	4	3
9	(South Africa) E Ferreira (South Africa) M de Swardt	4	4
(South Africa) C van Rensburg (Italy) L Golarsa	6	6
(South Africa) J-L de Jager (Canada) J Hetherington	3	3
(Switzerland) L Manta (Switzerland) M Hingis	6	6
(Netherlands) S Schalken (United States) E deLone	3	7^{7}	3
WC	(United Kingdom) D Sapsford (United Kingdom) S-A Siddall	6	6^{4}	6
(Netherlands) T Nijssen (Germany) C Porwik	6	6
Alt	(United Kingdom) P Hand (United Kingdom) V Lake	2	2

Second round
(Sweden) R Bergh (United States) K Po	7	7^{7}
(South Africa) D Adams (Australia) K-A Guse	5	6^{4}
(Netherlands) M Oosting (Belgium) E Callens	2	7	6
WC	(Australia) P Cash (France) M Pierce	6	5	8
(South Africa) C van Rensburg (Italy) L Golarsa	6	6
(Switzerland) L Manta (Switzerland) M Hingis	4	4
WC	(United Kingdom) D Sapsford (United Kingdom) S-A Siddall	6	6^{2}	6
(Netherlands) T Nijssen (Germany) C Porwik	4	7^{7}	4

Third round
(Sweden) R Bergh (United States) K Po	6	6
WC	(Australia) P Cash (France) M Pierce	3	4
(South Africa) C van Rensburg (Italy) L Golarsa	7^{7}	6
WC	(United Kingdom) D Sapsford (United Kingdom) S-A Siddall	6^{5}	3

Quarterfinals
(Sweden) R Bergh (United States) K Po	4	4
(South Africa) C van Rensburg (Italy) L Golarsa	6	6

=== Bottom half ===
==== Section 3 ====
First round
7	(Czech Republic) C Suk (Czech Republic) H Suková	6	6
(United States) F Montana (Australia) L Pleming	3	2
(Australia) P Tramacchi (Australia) R Stubbs	6	6
(Netherlands) S Noteboom (Argentina) M Paz	4	4
(Australia) D Macpherson (Australia) R McQuillan	6	7
(United Kingdom) N Broad (United States) A Grossman	4	5
(United States) M Lucena (United States) M McGrath	6	4	6
14	(South Africa) B Talbot (Netherlands) C Vis	3	6	4
15/ WC	(Switzerland) H Günthardt (Germany) S Graf	6	7
(Australia) A Florent (Australia) C Barclay	1	5
(Australia) S Draper (Australia) E Smylie	6	6
(India) L Paes (Japan) K Nagatsuka	4	4
(United States) L Jensen (United States) N Arendt	6	7^{7}
(Australia) P Kilderry (Japan) A Sugiyama	4	6^{1}
(Netherlands) HJ Davids (Netherlands) M Oremans	6	6
4	(United States) R Leach (Netherlands) M Bollegraf	3	3

Second round
7	(Czech Republic) C Suk (Czech Republic) H Suková	5	7^{7}	6
(Australia) P Tramacchi (Australia) R Stubbs	7	6^{3}	2
(Australia) D Macpherson (Australia) R McQuillan
(United States) M Lucena (United States) M McGrath	w/o
15/ WC	(Switzerland) H Günthardt (Germany) S Graf	w/o
(Australia) S Draper (Australia) E Smylie
(United States) L Jensen (United States) N Arendt	7^{7}	6
(Netherlands) HJ Davids (Netherlands) M Oremans	6^{5}	2

Third round
7	(Czech Republic) C Suk (Czech Republic) H Suková	6	4	6
(Australia) D Macpherson (Australia) R McQuillan	1	6	3
(Australia) S Draper (Australia) E Smylie	7^{9}	5	4
(United States) L Jensen (United States) N Arendt	6^{7}	7	6

Quarterfinals
7	(Czech Republic) C Suk (Czech Republic) H Suková	6	2	10
(United States) L Jensen (United States) N Arendt	3	6	8

==== Section 4 ====
First round
5/ WC	(United States) J Stark (United States) M Navratilova	6	3	6
(Australia) A Kratzmann (Sweden) M Lindström	3	6	2
(United States) J Belloli (Argentina) L Montalvo	3	3
(United States) K Kinnear (Japan) N Miyagi	6	6
(South Africa) M Barnard (United States) S Reece	6^{4}	7^{7}	3
(South Africa) M Ondruska (Germany) K Kschwendt	7^{7}	6^{4}	6
(Australia) J Ireland (Argentina) P Suárez	3	2
10	(Russia) A Olhovskiy (Netherlands) K Boogert	6	6
12	(United States) M Keil (United States) L McNeil	6	7
(United States) K Jones (United States) K Rinaldi-Stunkel	4	5
(Sweden) P Nyborg (Sweden) M Strandlund	6	2	8
(United Kingdom) M Petchey (United Kingdom) C Wood	4	6	6
(Netherlands) T Kempers (Poland) A Olsza	7^{7}	6
(United States) J Waite (Belgium) N Feber	6^{1}	3
(United States) K Thorne (France) A Fusai	6	2	14
2	(Canada) G Connell (United States) L Davenport	2	6	16

Second round
5/ WC	(United States) J Stark (United States) M Navratilova	7	7^{7}
(United States) K Kinnear (Japan) N Miyagi	5	6^{3}
(South Africa) M Ondruska (Germany) K Kschwendt	2	6	7
10	(Russia) A Olhovskiy (Netherlands) K Boogert	6	2	5
12	(United States) M Keil (United States) L McNeil	6	7^{7}
(Sweden) P Nyborg (Sweden) M Strandlund	4	6^{4}
(Netherlands) T Kempers (Poland) A Olsza	2	3
2	(Canada) G Connell (United States) L Davenport	6	6

Third round
5/ WC	(United States) J Stark (United States) M Navratilova	7^{7}	6^{4}	7
(South Africa) M Ondruska (Germany) K Kschwendt	6^{2}	7^{7}	5
12	(United States) M Keil (United States) L McNeil	2	0
2	(Canada) G Connell (United States) L Davenport	6	6

Quarterfinals
5/ WC	(United States) J Stark (United States) M Navratilova	6^{5}	6^{2}
2	(Canada) G Connell (United States) L Davenport	7^{7}	7^{7}
