= Mathias Huning =

German tennis player

- Country (sports): Germany
- Born: 25 June 1969 (age 56); Mettmann, West Germany
- Plays: Right-handed
- Prize money: $73,997

Singles
- Career record: 0–0
- Career titles: 0
- Highest ranking: No. 409 (8 February 1993)

Doubles
- Career record: 15–17
- Career titles: 0
- Highest ranking: No. 109 (17 February 1997)

Grand Slam doubles results
- Wimbledon: 1R (1996)

Mixed doubles

Grand Slam mixed doubles results
- Wimbledon: 1R (1996)

Mathias Huning (born 25 June 1969) is a former professional tennis player from Germany.

== Career ==
Huning, a doubles specialist, competed in both the men's doubles (with Jon Ireland) and mixed doubles (with Debbie Graham) at the 1996 Wimbledon Championships. He lost in the opening round in each.

On the ATP Tour he wasn't able to reach a final but was a doubles semi-finalist three times, at Casablanca in 1994, Bastad in 1995 and Casablanca again in 1997. He won five ATP Challenger titles.

== Challenger titles ==
=== Doubles: (5) ===
No.	Year	Tournament	Surface	Partner	Opponents	Score
1.	1994	Heilbronn, Germany	Carpet	(Latvia) Ģirts Dzelde	(Italy) Omar Camporese (Italy) Cristiano Caratti	6–4, 6–2
2.	1995	Lippstadt, Germany	Carpet	(United States) Bill Behrens	(United States) Bret Garnett (United States) T.J. Middleton	6–4, 3–6, 7–6
3.	1996	Prostejov, Czech Republic	Clay	(United States) Jack Waite	(Sweden) Fredrik Bergh (Sweden) Patrik Fredriksson	6–3, 7–6
4.	1997	Lübeck, Germany	Carpet	(Netherlands) Joost Winnink	(United States) Trey Phillips (United Kingdom) Chris Wilkinson	7–6, 7–6
5.	1997	Alpirsbach, Germany	Clay	(Australia) Grant Silcock	(Spain) Alex Lopez Moron (Italy) Fabio Maggi	5–7, 6–4, 7–5
