= 1996 Wimbledon Championships – Women's singles =

Women's singles
- 1996 Wimbledon Championships

Final
- Champion: (Germany) Steffi Graf
- Runner-up: (Spain) Arantxa Sánchez Vicario
- Score: 6–3, 7–5

Details
- Draw: 128 (8 Q / 8 WC )
- Seeds: 16

Events
Singles	men	women		boys	girls
Doubles	men	women	mixed	boys	girls
WC Singles	men	women	quad
WC Doubles	men	women	quad
Legends	men	women	seniors
← 1995 ·	Wimbledon Championships	· 1997 →

Defending champion Steffi Graf defeated Arantxa Sánchez Vicario in a rematch of the previous year's final, 6–3, 7–5 to win the ladies' singles tennis title at the 1996 Wimbledon Championships. It was her seventh and last Wimbledon singles title, and 20th major singles title overall. It was the second consecutive major final between the two, with Graf winning the French Open crown over Sánchez Vicario a month earlier.

Kimiko Date reached the semifinals, the last time a Japanese woman would do so at a major until Naomi Osaka in 2018.

== Seeds ==
1. (Germany) Steffi Graf (champion)
2. (United States) Monica Seles (second round)
3. (Spain) Conchita Martínez (fourth round)
4. (Spain) Arantxa Sánchez Vicario (final)
5. (Germany) Anke Huber (third round)
6. (Czech Republic) Jana Novotná (quarterfinals)
7. (United States) Chanda Rubin (withdrew)
8. (United States) Lindsay Davenport (second round)
9. (United States) Mary Joe Fernández (quarterfinals)
10. (Bulgaria) Magdalena Maleeva (second round)
11. (Netherlands) Brenda Schultz-McCarthy (third round)
12. (Japan) Kimiko Date (semifinals)
13. (France) Mary Pierce (quarterfinals)
14. (South Africa) Amanda Coetzer (second round)
15. (Romania) Irina Spîrlea (second round)
16. (Switzerland) Martina Hingis (fourth round)
17. (Slovakia) Karina Habšudová (first round)

Click on the seed number of a player to go to their draw section.

Chanda Rubin withdrew due to injury. She was replaced in the draw by the highest-ranked non-seeded player Karina Habšudová, who became the #17 seed.

== Draw ==
=== Key ===
- Q = Qualifier
- WC = Wild card
- LL = Lucky loser
- Alt = Alternate
- ITF = ITF entry
- PR = Protected ranking
- SR = Special ranking
- SE = Special exempt
- JE = Junior exempt
- JR = Junior Accelerator Programme entrant
- CO = College Accelerator Programme entrant
- NG = Next Gen Accelerator Program entrant
- w/o = Walkover
- r = Retired
- d = Defaulted

=== Finals ===
Quarterfinals
1	(Germany) Steffi Graf	6	6
6	(Czech Republic) Jana Novotná	3	2
12	(Japan) Kimiko Date	3	6	6
13	(France) Mary Pierce	6	3	1
(Austria) Judith Wiesner	4	0
4	(Spain) Arantxa Sánchez Vicario	6	6
9	(United States) Mary Joe Fernández	3	1
(United States) Meredith McGrath	6	6

Semifinals
1	(Germany) Steffi Graf	6	2	6
12	(Japan) Kimiko Date	2	6	3
4	(Spain) Arantxa Sánchez Vicario	6	6
(United States) Meredith McGrath	2	1

Final
1	(Germany) Steffi Graf	6	7
4	(Spain) Arantxa Sánchez Vicario	3	5

=== Top half ===
==== Section 1 ====
First round
1	(Germany) S Graf	6	6
(Czech Republic) L Richterová	4	1
(Italy) N Baudone	0	6	6
(Slovakia) J Husárová	6	1	1
(Slovakia) H Nagyová	3	2
(United States) N Arendt	6	6
(Germany) C Porwik	2	7	6
WC	(United Kingdom) C Wood	6	5	4
(France) A Fusai	7	7
(Austria) S Dopfer	5	6
(Australia) R Stubbs	1	4
(United States) L Wild	6	6
WC	(United Kingdom) R Viollet	6	2	6
WC	(United Kingdom) M Miller	2	6	1
(Canada) J Nejedly	2	2
16	(Switzerland) M Hingis	6	6

Second round
1	(Germany) S Graf	7	6
(Italy) N Baudone	5	3
(United States) N Arendt	2	6	6
(Germany) C Porwik	6	2	3
(France) A Fusai	4	2
(United States) L Wild	6	6
WC	(United Kingdom) R Viollet	1	1
16	(Switzerland) M Hingis	6	6

Third round
1	(Germany) S Graf	6	6
(United States) N Arendt	2	1
(United States) L Wild	3	6	1
16	(Switzerland) M Hingis	6	2	6

Fourth round
1	(Germany) S Graf	6	6
16	(Switzerland) M Hingis	1	4

==== Section 2 ====
First round
10	(Bulgaria) M Maleeva	6	6
(Germany) B Rittner	2	1
(Netherlands) P Kamstra	2	6	1
(France) N Tauziat	6	3	6
(Belarus) N Zvereva	6	6
(Italy) F Lubiani	3	1
(South Africa) M de Swardt	6^{2}	4
(Canada) P Hy-Boulais	7^{7}	6
(Sweden) Å Carlsson	6	3	3
(Germany) K Kschwendt	4	6	6
(Romania) R Dragomir	6^{7}	7	8
(Indonesia) Y Basuki	7^{9}	5	6
(Belgium) L Courtois	4	6	6
(Germany) A Glass	6	2	2
(Germany) V Martinek	4	0
6	(Czech Republic) J Novotná	6	6

Second round
10	(Bulgaria) M Maleeva	6^{7}	6	7
(France) N Tauziat	7^{9}	3	9
(Belarus) N Zvereva	2	4
(Canada) P Hy-Boulais	6	6
(Germany) K Kschwendt	2	0
(Romania) R Dragomir	6	6
(Belgium) L Courtois	6	3
6	(Czech Republic) J Novotná	7	6

Third round
(France) N Tauziat	3	6	4
(Canada) P Hy-Boulais	6	3	6
(Romania) R Dragomir	3	1
6	(Czech Republic) J Novotná	6	6

Fourth round
(Canada) P Hy-Boulais	3	1
6	(Czech Republic) J Novotná	6	6

==== Section 3 ====
First round
3	(Spain) C Martínez	6	6
(Italy) S Farina	0	0
(United States) L Raymond	6	3	6
(Spain) Á Montolio	2	6	2
(United States) L McNeil	6^{7}	6	6
Q	(Italy) L Golarsa	7^{9}	4	4
(United States) K Po	6	6
Q	(France) A Cocheteux	4	3
(Spain) V Ruano Pascual	7	4	2
(Netherlands) K Boogert	5	6	6
(Australia) N Bradtke	3	0
Q	(Australia) K-A Guse	6	6
(France) A-G Sidot	6	6
Q	(Romania) C Cristea	4	1
(Japan) K Nagatsuka	0	3
12	(Japan) K Date	6	6

Second round
3	(Spain) C Martínez	7	7
(United States) L Raymond	5	5
(United States) L McNeil	4	6	6
(United States) K Po	6	0	3
(Netherlands) K Boogert	4	6	6
Q	(Australia) K-A Guse	6	3	1
(France) A-G Sidot	7^{7}	3	3
12	(Japan) K Date	6^{5}	6	6

Third round
3	(Spain) C Martínez	7	7^{7}
(United States) L McNeil	5	6^{4}
(Netherlands) K Boogert	6	4	2
12	(Japan) K Date	2	6	6

Fourth round
3	(Spain) C Martínez	7	6^{5}	3
12	(Japan) K Date	5	7^{7}	6

==== Section 4 ====
First round
13	(France) M Pierce	6	6
(Switzerland) P Schnyder	3	2
WC	(United Kingdom) J Ward	3	2
WC	(United Kingdom) C Taylor	6	6
(Japan) R Hiraki	7	6
(Germany) C Singer	5	4
(United States) C Morariu	7	5	4
(Ukraine) N Medvedeva	5	7	6
(Russia) E Likhovtseva	7^{7}	6
(Belgium) E Callens	6^{4}	3
(Mexico) A Gavaldón	6^{4}	1
(United States) K Adams	7^{7}	6
(Latvia) L Neiland	6	6
WC	(United States) K Rinaldi-Stunkel	3	3
(Austria) M Schnell	4	1
8	(United States) L Davenport	6	6

Second round
13	(France) M Pierce	6	6
WC	(United Kingdom) C Taylor	4	2
(Japan) R Hiraki	3	2
(Ukraine) N Medvedeva	6	6
(Russia) E Likhovtseva	6	6
(United States) K Adams	4	3
(Latvia) L Neiland	6	6
8	(United States) L Davenport	3	2

Third round
13	(France) M Pierce	6	6
(Ukraine) N Medvedeva	4	1
(Russia) E Likhovtseva	6	4	6
(Latvia) L Neiland	3	6	0

Fourth round
13	(France) M Pierce	6	6
(Russia) E Likhovtseva	2	3

=== Bottom half ===
==== Section 5 ====
First round
17	(Slovakia) K Habšudová	0	5
(Austria) J Wiesner	6	7
(United States) M Werdel-Witmeyer	4	4
Q	(Argentina) M Paz	6	6
(Poland) K Nowak	0	2
(Italy) G Pizzichini	6	6
(Federal Republic of Yugoslavia) T Ječmenica	6	3	4
(United States) G Fernández	2	6	6
(Slovakia) R Zrubáková	2	2
(South Korea) S-h Park	6	6
(United States) A Frazier	6	6
(Madagascar) D Randriantefy	3	1
(Argentina) I Gorrochategui	6	7^{7}
(Israel) A Smashnova	4	6^{5}
WC	(United Kingdom) S Smith	6	1	2
15	(Romania) I Spîrlea	3	6	6

Second round
(Austria) J Wiesner	6	6
Q	(Argentina) M Paz	2	3
(Italy) G Pizzichini	2	1
(United States) G Fernández	6	6
(South Korea) S-h Park	4	1
(United States) A Frazier	6	6
(Argentina) I Gorrochategui	6	2	6
15	(Romania) I Spîrlea	3	6	4

Third round
(Austria) J Wiesner	6	7
(United States) G Fernández	2	5
(United States) A Frazier	6	6
(Argentina) I Gorrochategui	0	3

Fourth round
(Austria) J Wiesner	6	6
(United States) A Frazier	4	4

==== Section 6 ====
First round
11	(Netherlands) B Schultz-McCarthy	6	6
(South Africa) J Kruger	0	3
(Czech Republic) R Bobková	3	3
(United States) J Watanabe	6	6
LL	(Poland) A Olsza	6	6
(Poland) M Grzybowska	4	4
(Japan) N Miyagi	3	4
(Belgium) S Appelmans	6	6
LL	(Italy) F Perfetti	4	6	11
(Spain) M Sánchez Lorenzo	6	2	9
(Japan) N Sawamatsu	7^{7}	6
(Japan) N Kijimuta	6^{3}	2
(Netherlands) M Oremans	7^{7}	6
(Italy) R Grande	6^{4}	3
(Italy) A Serra Zanetti	3	4
4	(Spain) A Sánchez Vicario	6	6

Second round
11	(Netherlands) B Schultz-McCarthy	6	6
(United States) J Watanabe	3	0
LL	(Poland) A Olsza	3	1
(Belgium) S Appelmans	6	6
LL	(Italy) F Perfetti	4	0
(Japan) N Sawamatsu	6	6
(Netherlands) M Oremans	5	3
4	(Spain) A Sánchez Vicario	7	6

Third round
11	(Netherlands) B Schultz-McCarthy	5	6	10
(Belgium) S Appelmans	7	3	12
(Japan) N Sawamatsu	4	1
4	(Spain) A Sánchez Vicario	6	6

Fourth round
(Belgium) S Appelmans	6	2	1
4	(Spain) A Sánchez Vicario	3	6	6

==== Section 7 ====
First round
5	(Germany) A Huber	6	6
(Spain) G León García	1	1
WC	(United States) P Shriver	6	6
Q	(Australia) A Ellwood	4	4
(Australia) K Godridge	3	3
(Czech Republic) H Suková	6	6
Q	(Luxembourg) A Kremer	5	4
(Japan) A Sugiyama	7	6
(Germany) P Begerow	4	6	6
(Austria) B Schett	6	2	3
(Argentina) F Labat	6	2	7
(United States) T Whitlinger-Jones	1	6	5
(United States) S Cacic	1	3
(France) S Testud	6	6
(Germany) J Kandarr	0	0
9	(United States) MJ Fernández	6	6

Second round
5	(Germany) A Huber	6	6
WC	(United States) P Shriver	2	1
(Czech Republic) H Suková	4	1
(Japan) A Sugiyama	6	6
(Austria) B Schett	2	6	2
(Argentina) F Labat	6	2	6
(France) S Testud	4	4
9	(United States) MJ Fernández	6	6

Third round
5	(Germany) A Huber	6^{3}	1
(Japan) A Sugiyama	7^{7}	6
(Argentina) F Labat	2	0
9	(United States) MJ Fernández	6	6

Fourth round
(Japan) A Sugiyama	4	6	3
9	(United States) MJ Fernández	6	1	6

==== Section 8 ====
First round
14	(South Africa) A Coetzer	6	6
(Bulgaria) E Pampoulova	1	1
(Japan) M Endo	2	5
(United States) M McGrath	6	7
(France) A Dechaume-Balleret	1	1
(Belgium) N Feber	6	6
(United States) A Miller	6	6
(Argentina) P Suárez	2	2
(Japan) Y Kamio	6	6
(France) N Dechy	2	3
(Belgium) D Van Roost	6	6
Q	(Canada) M Drake	3	3
(Russia) E Makarova	2	4
(Slovakia) K Studeníková	6	6
(United States) A Grossman	1	2
2	(United States) M Seles	6	6

Second round
14	(South Africa) A Coetzer	6^{4}	6	3
(United States) M McGrath	7^{7}	2	6
(Belgium) N Feber	6	6
(United States) A Miller	1	2
(Japan) Y Kamio	0	0
(Belgium) D Van Roost	6	6
(Slovakia) K Studeníková	7	5	6
2	(United States) M Seles	5	7	4

Third round
(United States) M McGrath	7	6^{4}	6
(Belgium) N Feber	5	7^{7}	2
(Belgium) D Van Roost	3	2
(Slovakia) K Studeníková	6	6

Fourth round
(United States) M McGrath	6	6
(Slovakia) K Studeníková	4	0

Preceded by 1996 French Open – Women's singles	Grand Slam women's singles	Succeeded by 1996 US Open – Women's singles
