= 1996 Wimbledon Championships – Women's doubles =

Women's doubles
- 1996 Wimbledon Championships

Final
- Champions: (Switzerland) Martina Hingis (Czech Republic) Helena Suková
- Runners-up: (United States) Meredith McGrath (Latvia) Larisa Neiland
- Score: 5–7, 7–5, 6–1

Details
- Draw: 64 (2 Q / 4 WC )
- Seeds: 16

Events
Singles	men	women		boys	girls
Doubles	men	women	mixed	boys	girls
WC Singles	men	women	quad
WC Doubles	men	women	quad
Legends	men	women	seniors
← 1995 ·	Wimbledon Championships	· 1997 →

Jana Novotná and Arantxa Sánchez Vicario were the defending champions but lost in the quarterfinals to Martina Hingis and Helena Suková.

Hingis and Suková defeated Meredith McGrath and Larisa Neiland in the final, 5–7, 7–5, 6–1 to win the ladies' doubles tennis title at the 1996 Wimbledon Championships. At 15 Years 282 Days, Hingis became the youngest ever grand slam champion. It was the 1st Grand Slam (doubles) title and the 2nd title overall for Hingis, and the 9th and final Grand Slam doubles title and the 64th title overall for Suková, in their respective careers.

== Seeds ==
1. (Czech Republic) Jana Novotná / (Spain) Arantxa Sánchez Vicario (quarterfinals)
2. (United States) Gigi Fernández / (Belarus) Natasha Zvereva (semifinals)
3. (United States) Lindsay Davenport / (United States) Mary Joe Fernández (quarterfinals, retired)
4. (United States) Meredith McGrath / (Latvia) Larisa Neiland (final)
5. n/a
6. (United States) Nicole Arendt / (Netherlands) Manon Bollegraf (third round)
7. (United States) Lori McNeil / (France) Nathalie Tauziat (second round)
8. (Switzerland) Martina Hingis / (Czech Republic) Helena Suková (champions)
9. (United States) Lisa Raymond / (Australia) Rennae Stubbs (third round)
10. (United States) Katrina Adams / (South Africa) Mariaan de Swardt (quarterfinals)
11. (Netherlands) Kristie Boogert / (Romania) Irina Spîrlea (third round)
12. (Indonesia) Yayuk Basuki / (Netherlands) Caroline Vis (quarterfinals)
13. (Spain) Conchita Martínez / (Argentina) Patricia Tarabini (third round)
14. (France) Alexia Dechaume-Balleret / (France) Sandrine Testud (third round, retired)
15. (Australia) Elizabeth Smylie / (United States) Linda Wild (semifinals)
16. (Australia) Nicole Bradtke / (Australia) Rachel McQuillan (third round)
17. (Italy) Laura Golarsa / (Australia) Kristine Radford (first round)

Click on the seed number of a player to go to their draw section.

== Draw ==
=== Key ===
- Q = Qualifier
- WC = Wild card
- LL = Lucky loser
- Alt = Alternate
- ITF = ITF entry
- PR = Protected ranking
- SR = Special ranking
- SE = Special exempt
- JE = Junior exempt
- JR = Junior Accelerator Programme entrant
- CO = College Accelerator Programme entrant
- NG = Next Gen Accelerator Program entrant
- w/o = Walkover
- r = Retired
- d = Defaulted

=== Finals ===
Quarterfinals
1	(Czech Republic) Jana Novotná (Spain) Arantxa Sánchez Vicario	6	6^{4}	3
8	(Switzerland) Martina Hingis (Czech Republic) Helena Suková	3	7^{7}	6
3	(United States) Lindsay Davenport (United States) Mary Joe Fernández	3^{r}
15	(Australia) Elizabeth Smylie (United States) Linda Wild	5
10	(United States) Katrina Adams (South Africa) Mariaan de Swardt	4	6^{0}
4	(United States) Meredith McGrath (Latvia) Larisa Neiland	6	7^{7}
12	(Indonesia) Yayuk Basuki (Netherlands) Caroline Vis	1	4
2	(United States) Gigi Fernández (Belarus) Natasha Zvereva	6	6

Semifinals
8	(Switzerland) Martina Hingis (Czech Republic) Helena Suková	6	4	6
15	(Australia) Elizabeth Smylie (United States) Linda Wild	4	6	4
4	(United States) Meredith McGrath (Latvia) Larisa Neiland	6	3	11
2	(United States) Gigi Fernández (Belarus) Natasha Zvereva	4	6	9

Final
8	(Switzerland) Martina Hingis (Czech Republic) Helena Suková	5	7	6
4	(United States) Meredith McGrath (Latvia) Larisa Neiland	7	5	1

=== Top half ===
==== Section 1 ====
First round
1	(Czech Republic) J Novotná (Spain) A Sánchez Vicario	4	6	6
(United States) A Frazier (United States) K Po	6	2	1
(Romania) R Dragomir (United States) A Grossman	6	7^{7}
(Germany) S Meier (Slovakia) H Nagyová	2	6^{3}
Q	(France) I Demongeot (France) C Dhenin	6	6
(France) L Ghirardi-Rubbi (France) S Pitkowski	3	0
(United States) A Lettiere (United States) C Morariu	6^{4}	1
11	(Netherlands) K Boogert (Romania) I Spîrlea	7^{7}	6
13	(Spain) C Martínez (Argentina) P Tarabini	7	6
(Japan) K Nagatsuka (Japan) A Sugiyama	5	3
(Italy) S Farina (Spain) V Ruano Pascual	3	4
(Italy) R Grande (Russia) E Likhovtseva	6	6
WC	(United Kingdom) S-A Siddall (United Kingdom) A Wainwright	6	3	2
(Slovenia) T Križan (Greece) C Papadáki	4	6	6
(Australia) C Barclay (Australia) K Godridge	1	5
8	(Switzerland) M Hingis (Czech Republic) H Suková	6	7

Second round
1	(Czech Republic) J Novotná (Spain) A Sánchez Vicario	6	6
(Romania) R Dragomir (United States) A Grossman	0	1
Q	(France) I Demongeot (France) C Dhenin	4	2
11	(Netherlands) K Boogert (Romania) I Spîrlea	6	6
13	(Spain) C Martínez (Argentina) P Tarabini	7^{7}	6
(Italy) R Grande (Russia) E Likhovtseva	6^{2}	4
(Slovenia) T Križan (Greece) C Papadáki	4	3
8	(Switzerland) M Hingis (Czech Republic) H Suková	6	6

Third round
1	(Czech Republic) J Novotná (Spain) A Sánchez Vicario	6	6
11	(Netherlands) K Boogert (Romania) I Spîrlea	3	3
13	(Spain) C Martínez (Argentina) P Tarabini	6^{5}	0
8	(Switzerland) M Hingis (Czech Republic) H Suková	7^{7}	6

Quarterfinals
1	(Czech Republic) J Novotná (Spain) A Sánchez Vicario	6	6^{4}	3
8	(Switzerland) M Hingis (Czech Republic) H Suková	3	7^{7}	6

==== Section 2 ====
First round
3	(United States) L Davenport (United States) MJ Fernández	6	1	6
(Japan) N Kijimuta (Japan) Y Yoshida	3	6	1
(Canada) S Jeyaseelan (Canada) R Simpson	7	2	1
(South Africa) A Coetzer (Argentina) I Gorrochategui	5	6	6
(Czech Republic) R Bobková (Czech Republic) E Melicharová	7	4	2
(United States) D Graham (Argentina) M Paz	5	6	6
(Germany) W Probst (Germany) C Singer	4	6	6
17	(Italy) L Golarsa (Australia) K Radford	6	4	2
15	(Australia) E Smylie (United States) L Wild	6	6
(Germany) K Kschwendt (Argentina) F Labat	2	1
LL	(Australia) D Jones (South Africa) T Price	6	6
(Finland) N Dahlman (United Kingdom) C Wood	4	4
(Argentina) L Montalvo (Argentina) P Suárez	4	3
(Japan) N Miyagi (United States) S Reece	6	6
(Ukraine) O Lugina (Bulgaria) E Pampoulova	4	0
9	(United States) L Raymond (Australia) R Stubbs	6	6

Second round
3	(United States) L Davenport (United States) MJ Fernández	6	6
(South Africa) A Coetzer (Argentina) I Gorrochategui	3	2
(United States) D Graham (Argentina) M Paz	3	2
(Germany) W Probst (Germany) C Singer	6	6
15	(Australia) E Smylie (United States) L Wild	6	6
LL	(Australia) D Jones (South Africa) T Price	4	4
(Japan) N Miyagi (United States) S Reece	5	2
9	(United States) L Raymond (Australia) R Stubbs	7	6

Third round
3	(United States) L Davenport (United States) MJ Fernández	6	6
(Germany) W Probst (Germany) C Singer	2	2
15	(Australia) E Smylie (United States) L Wild	6	7
9	(United States) L Raymond (Australia) R Stubbs	4	5

Quarterfinals
3	(United States) L Davenport (United States) MJ Fernández	3^{r}
15	(Australia) E Smylie (United States) L Wild	5

=== Bottom half ===
==== Section 3 ====
First round
7	(United States) L McNeil (France) N Tauziat	7^{7}	1	6
(Belgium) N Feber (Belgium) D Van Roost	6^{3}	6	4
WC	(United States) E Nagelsen (United States) M Seles	6	4	7
(South Africa) R Nideffer (United States) P Shriver	4	6	9
(United States) M Werdel-Witmeyer (United States) T Whitlinger-Jones	6	6
(Poland) M Grzybowska (Poland) A Olsza	4	1
(Belgium) E Callens (Belgium) L Courtois	1	4
10	(United States) K Adams (South Africa) M de Swardt	6	6
14	(France) A Dechaume-Balleret (France) S Testud	6	6
(United States) E deLone (Australia) N Pratt	3	2
(Netherlands) M Koutstaal (South Korea) S-h Park	4	2
(Belgium) S Appelmans (Netherlands) M Oremans	6	6
(Japan) R Hiraki (Canada) P Hy-Boulais	6	6
(Slovakia) D Krajčovičová (Slovakia) R Zrubáková	3	4
WC	(United Kingdom) H Crook (United Kingdom) V Davies	2	4
4	(United States) M McGrath (Latvia) L Neiland	6	6

Second round
7	(United States) L McNeil (France) N Tauziat	7^{7}	4	1
(South Africa) R Nideffer (United States) P Shriver	6^{5}	6	6
(United States) M Werdel-Witmeyer (United States) T Whitlinger-Jones	7^{7}	2	2
10	(United States) K Adams (South Africa) M de Swardt	6^{4}	6	6
14	(France) A Dechaume-Balleret (France) S Testud	7^{8}	6
(Belgium) S Appelmans (Netherlands) M Oremans	6^{6}	4
(Japan) R Hiraki (Canada) P Hy-Boulais	2	4
4	(United States) M McGrath (Latvia) L Neiland	6	6

Third round
(South Africa) R Nideffer (United States) P Shriver	1	4
10	(United States) K Adams (South Africa) M de Swardt	6	6
14	(France) A Dechaume-Balleret (France) S Testud	3	0^{r}
4	(United States) M McGrath (Latvia) L Neiland	6	0

Quarterfinals
10	(United States) K Adams (South Africa) M de Swardt	4	6^{0}
4	(United States) M McGrath (Latvia) L Neiland	6	7^{7}

==== Section 4 ====
First round
6	(United States) N Arendt (Netherlands) M Bollegraf	6	7
(Italy) A-M Cecchini (Italy) L Garrone	3	5
(Sweden) Å Carlsson (Hungary) A Temesvári	6	6
(Romania) C Cristea (Germany) C Schneider	0	4
LL	(Russia) J Lutrova (Thailand) T Tanasugarn	7^{7}	6
(Sweden) M Lindström (Sweden) M Strandlund	6^{4}	4
Q	(United Kingdom) J Pullin (United Kingdom) L Woodroffe	3	0
12	(Indonesia) Y Basuki (Netherlands) C Vis	6	6
16	(Australia) N Bradtke (Australia) R McQuillan	6	6
WC	(United Kingdom) V Lake (United Kingdom) S Smith	2	3
(Croatia) M Murić (Slovakia) K Studeníková	4	2
(Canada) J Hetherington (United States) K Rinaldi-Stunkel	6	6
(Federal Republic of Yugoslavia) T Ječmenica (Germany) C Porwik	3	7^{9}	4
(France) A Fusai (Australia) K-A Guse	6	6^{7}	6
(Czech Republic) P Langrová (Czech Republic) H Vildová	2	1
2	(United States) G Fernández (Belarus) N Zvereva	6	6

Second round
6	(United States) N Arendt (Netherlands) M Bollegraf	6	6
(Sweden) Å Carlsson (Hungary) A Temesvári	1	2
LL	(Russia) J Lutrova (Thailand) T Tanasugarn	6^{3}	7^{7}	4
12	(Indonesia) Y Basuki (Netherlands) C Vis	7^{7}	6^{4}	6
16	(Australia) N Bradtke (Australia) R McQuillan	6	6
(Canada) J Hetherington (United States) K Rinaldi-Stunkel	3	1
(France) A Fusai (Australia) K-A Guse	3	2
2	(United States) G Fernández (Belarus) N Zvereva	6	6

Third round
6	(United States) N Arendt (Netherlands) M Bollegraf	2	6^{3}
12	(Indonesia) Y Basuki (Netherlands) C Vis	6	7^{7}
16	(Australia) N Bradtke (Australia) R McQuillan	2	1
2	(United States) G Fernández (Belarus) N Zvereva	6	6

Quarterfinals
12	(Indonesia) Y Basuki (Netherlands) C Vis	1	4
2	(United States) G Fernández (Belarus) N Zvereva	6	6
