= 1996 Wimbledon Championships – Men's singles =

Men's singles
- 1996 Wimbledon Championships

Final
- Champion: (Netherlands) Richard Krajicek
- Runner-up: (United States) MaliVai Washington
- Score: 6–3, 6–4, 6–3

Details
- Draw: 128 (16Q / 8WC)
- Seeds: 16

Events
Singles	men	women		boys	girls
Doubles	men	women	mixed	boys	girls
WC Singles	men	women	quad
WC Doubles	men	women	quad
Legends	men	women	seniors
- Wimbledon Championships

Richard Krajicek defeated MaliVai Washington in the final, 6–3, 6–4, 6–3 to win the gentlemen's singles tennis title at the 1996 Wimbledon Championships. It was his first and only major singles title. Krajicek notably became the first Dutch singles champion in the tournament's history. Krajicek was originally unseeded, but replaced seventh seed Thomas Muster in the draw when Muster withdrew from the tournament. Washington was the first Black major finalist since Yannick Noah at the 1983 French Open, and the first at Wimbledon since Arthur Ashe in 1975.

Pete Sampras was the three-time defending champion, but was defeated by Krajicek in the quarterfinals. It would be his only loss at Wimbledon between 1993 and 2000. For the first time since the 1990 French Open, none of the four semifinalists at a major had previously won a major title. Of the four, only Todd Martin had reached a major final before. An unusual number of top seeds were eliminated early, including 1992 champion Andre Agassi (No. 3), reigning French Open champion Yevgeny Kafelnikov (No. 5), Michael Chang (No. 6), and 1993 finalist Jim Courier (No. 9): all in the first round. Three-time champion Boris Becker, seeded second, was eliminated in the third round when he withdrew with a wrist injury.

== Seeds ==
1. (United States) Pete Sampras (quarterfinals)
2. (Germany) Boris Becker (third round, retired)
3. (United States) Andre Agassi (first round)
4. (Croatia) Goran Ivanišević (quarterfinals)
5. (Russia) Yevgeny Kafelnikov (first round)
6. (United States) Michael Chang (first round)
7. (Austria) Thomas Muster (withdrew)
8. (United States) Jim Courier (first round)
9. (Sweden) Thomas Enqvist (second round)
10. (Germany) Michael Stich (fourth round)
11. (South Africa) Wayne Ferreira (third round)
12. (Sweden) Stefan Edberg (second round)
13. (United States) Todd Martin (semifinals)
14. (Switzerland) Marc Rosset (third round)
15. (France) Arnaud Boetsch (first round)
16. (France) Cédric Pioline (fourth round)
17. (Netherlands) Richard Krajicek (champion)

Click on the seed number of a player to go to their draw section.

Thomas Muster withdrew due to injury. His spot was replaced in the draw by the highest-ranked non-seeded player Richard Krajicek, who was made a seed without being numbered. Although Krajicek was shown as unseeded in the official souvenir programme during the championships, the committee ruled that he was seeded throughout and this is reflected in the final issue of the programme. He was indeed replaced by lucky loser Anders Järryd in the main draw.

== Draw ==
Key

- Q = Qualifier
- WC = Wild card
- LL = Lucky loser
- Alt = Alternate
- ITF = ITF entry
- PR = Protected ranking
- SR = Special ranking
- SE = Special exempt
- JE = Junior exempt
- JR = Junior Accelerator Programme entrant
- CO = College Accelerator Programme entrant
- NG = Next Gen Accelerator Program entrant
- w/o = Walkover
- r = Retired
- d = Defaulted

=== Finals ===
Quarterfinals
1	(United States) Pete Sampras	5	6^{3}	4
17	(Netherlands) Richard Krajicek	7	7^{7}	6
4	(Croatia) Goran Ivanišević	3	6^{3}	7^{7}	6^{3}
(Australia) Jason Stoltenberg	6	7^{7}	6^{3}	7^{7}
(United Kingdom) Tim Henman	6^{5}	6^{2}	4
13	(United States) Todd Martin	7^{7}	7^{7}	6
(United States) MaliVai Washington	6^{5}	7^{7}	5	7^{7}	6
(Germany) Alex Rădulescu	7^{7}	6^{1}	7	6^{3}	4

Semifinals
17	(Netherlands) Richard Krajicek	7	6	6
(Australia) Jason Stoltenberg	5	2	1
13	(United States) Todd Martin	7	4	7^{8}	3	8
(United States) MaliVai Washington	5	6	6^{6}	6	10

Final
17	(Netherlands) Richard Krajicek	6	6	6
(United States) MaliVai Washington	3	4	3

=== Top half ===
==== Section 1 ====
First round
1	(United States) P Sampras	4	6	6	6
(United States) R Reneberg	6	4	3	3
(Australia) M Philippoussis	7	4	6	6
(Argentina) J Frana	5	6	3	2
(Belgium) K Goossens	7	1	2	3
(Zimbabwe) B Black	5	6	6	6
(Morocco) K Alami	3	3	3
(Slovakia) K Kučera	6	6	6
(Slovakia) J Krošlák	6	7^{7}	7
WC	(United Kingdom) A Foster	3	6^{4}	5
WC	(United Kingdom) C Wilkinson	6	6	5	6
LL	(Sweden) A Järryd	1	3	7	2
LL	(India) L Paes	6	2	4	6^{11}
WC	(United Kingdom) M Petchey	1	6	6	7^{13}
(Netherlands) J Siemerink	6^{4}	6^{5}	4
16	(France) C Pioline	7^{7}	7^{7}	6

Second round
1	(United States) P Sampras	7^{7}	6	6
(Australia) M Philippoussis	6^{4}	4	4
(Zimbabwe) B Black	6	1	7	3	3
(Slovakia) K Kučera	4	6	5	6	6
(Slovakia) J Krošlák	1	7	5	6	6
WC	(United Kingdom) C Wilkinson	6	5	7	4	3
WC	(United Kingdom) M Petchey	1	4	2
16	(France) C Pioline	6	6	6

Third round
1	(United States) P Sampras	6	6	6^{5}	7^{7}
(Slovakia) K Kučera	4	1	7^{7}	6^{3}
(Slovakia) J Krošlák	2	6^{5}	3
16	(France) C Pioline	6	7^{7}	6

Fourth round
1	(United States) P Sampras	6	6	6
16	(France) C Pioline	4	4	2

==== Section 2 ====
First round
10	(Germany) M Stich	6	3	6	6
(Netherlands) S Schalken	3	6	1	2
(Norway) C Ruud	1	0	2
(Japan) S Matsuoka	6	6	6
(Australia) S Stolle	6	6	6
Q	(Italy) D Nargiso	3	3	1
(Australia) M Woodforde	3	2	5
(Sweden) M Larsson	6	6	7
Q	(Canada) D Nestor	6^{4}	6^{5}	2
(United Kingdom) G Rusedski	7^{7}	7^{7}	6
Q	(Netherlands) T Kempers	5	6^{7}	3
(New Zealand) B Steven	7	7^{9}	6
(United States) D Rostagno	6	6	7^{7}
(Belgium) J Van Herck	4	3	6^{4}
(Spain) J Sánchez	4	3	4
17	(Netherlands) R Krajicek	6	6	6

Second round
10	(Germany) M Stich	7^{7}	6	6^{5}	6
(Japan) S Matsuoka	6^{2}	4	7^{7}	1
(Australia) S Stolle	6	1	7^{7}	6
(Sweden) M Larsson	2	6	6^{4}	4
(United Kingdom) G Rusedski	6^{7}	6	6^{12}	2
(New Zealand) B Steven	7^{9}	4	7^{14}	6
(United States) D Rostagno	4	3	3
17	(Netherlands) R Krajicek	6	6	6

Third round
10	(Germany) M Stich	6	4	6	6
(Australia) S Stolle	3	6	2	3
(New Zealand) B Steven	6^{5}	7^{7}	4	2
17	(Netherlands) R Krajicek	7^{7}	6^{5}	6	6

Fourth round
10	(Germany) M Stich	4	6^{5}	4
17	(Netherlands) R Krajicek	6	7^{7}	6

==== Section 3 ====
First round
4	(Croatia) G Ivanišević	6	6	6
LL	(South Africa) D Nainkin	2	0	2
Q	(France) P Bouteyre	6^{5}	7^{7}	2	6	10
(Spain) C Moyá	7^{7}	6^{5}	6	4	8
Q	(Switzerland) L Manta	4	6^{2}	6	1
(Russia) A Volkov	6	7^{7}	1	6
(Uzbekistan) O Ogorodov	6	1	4	4
(Czech Republic) M Damm	4	6	6	6
(Italy) G Pozzi	6	6	6
(Portugal) J Cunha e Silva	2	4	2
(Australia) P Rafter	6	6	7^{7}
(Czech Republic) D Vacek	2	4	6^{3}
(Russia) A Olhovskiy	6^{4}	6	6	6
(Germany) H Dreekmann	7^{7}	2	2	2
(Australia) S Draper	6	4	3	1
14	(Switzerland) M Rosset	4	6	6	6

Second round
4	(Croatia) G Ivanišević	7	6	6
Q	(France) P Bouteyre	5	4	4
(Russia) A Volkov	7^{7}	4	4	6	6
(Czech Republic) M Damm	6^{4}	6	6	3	4
(Italy) G Pozzi	1	5	4
(Australia) P Rafter	6	7	6
(Russia) A Olhovskiy	3	6^{4}	4
14	(Switzerland) M Rosset	6	7^{7}	6

Third round
4	(Croatia) G Ivanišević	7^{7}	7	6
(Russia) A Volkov	6^{3}	5	3
(Australia) P Rafter	4	6	4	6	6
14	(Switzerland) M Rosset	6	3	6	1	3

Fourth round
4	(Croatia) G Ivanišević	7^{7}	4	7^{9}	6
(Australia) P Rafter	6^{4}	6	6^{7}	1

==== Section 4 ====
First round
12	(Sweden) S Edberg	7^{7}	5	6	6
(France) G Forget	6^{5}	7	2	2
(Sweden) M Tillström	7^{7}	3	6	3	12
(Germany) M-K Goellner	6^{5}	6	3	6	10
(Australia) M Tebbutt	6	6^{4}	4	4
(Spain) À Corretja	3	7^{7}	6	6
(Russia) A Chesnokov	3	2	3
(Switzerland) J Hlasek	6	6	6
Q	(Germany) J Renzenbrink	6^{5}	2	4
(Czech Republic) J Novák	7^{7}	6	6
(Australia) J Stoltenberg	4	6	5	6	6
(Romania) A Voinea	6	4	7	2	0
Q	(Italy) M Navarra	4	6	6	6
(Czech Republic) D Rikl	6	2	2	2
(Spain) A Costa	3	7^{7}	7^{7}	6
6	(United States) M Chang	6	6^{5}	6^{1}	4

Second round
12	(Sweden) S Edberg	6	4	6^{5}	4
(Sweden) M Tillström	4	6	7^{7}	6
(Spain) À Corretja	6	3	4	4
(Switzerland) J Hlasek	4	6	6	6
(Czech Republic) J Novák	6^{5}	1	1
(Australia) J Stoltenberg	7^{7}	6	6
Q	(Italy) M Navarra	4	7^{8}	3	7	9
(Spain) A Costa	6	6^{6}	6	5	7

Third round
(Sweden) M Tillström	4	6	5	1
(Switzerland) J Hlasek	6	3	7	6
(Australia) J Stoltenberg	6	6	6
Q	(Italy) M Navarra	2	2	2

Fourth round
(Switzerland) J Hlasek	2	6^{2}	2
(Australia) J Stoltenberg	6	7^{7}	6

=== Bottom half ===
==== Section 5 ====
First round
5	(Russia) Y Kafelnikov	6^{6}	3	7^{7}	6	5
(United Kingdom) T Henman	7^{8}	6	6^{2}	4	7
Q	(Australia) P Tramacchi	5	4	3
WC	(United Kingdom) D Sapsford	7	6	6
(Sweden) J Björkman	6	1	6	5	4
WC	(United Kingdom) L Milligan	4	6	2	7	6
(Denmark) K Carlsen	6^{3}	6	7^{8}	4	4
(Ecuador) N Lapentti	7^{7}	3	6^{6}	6	6
(Australia) T Woodbridge	6	6	3	6
Q	(France) S Huet	4	2	6	0
(Sweden) M Gustafsson	7^{7}	6	6
Q	(Australia) A Ilie	6^{4}	3	2
(United States) M Joyce	6	2	7	1	3
(Italy) A Gaudenzi	1	6	5	6	6
(Germany) D Prinosil	6^{6}	3	3
11	(South Africa) W Ferreira	7^{8}	6	6

Second round
(United Kingdom) T Henman	6	6^{3}	6	6
WC	(United Kingdom) D Sapsford	1	7^{7}	0	1
WC	(United Kingdom) L Milligan	6	6	6^{5}	6^{3}	6
(Ecuador) N Lapentti	4	2	7^{7}	7^{7}	1
(Australia) T Woodbridge	6^{5}	3	2
(Sweden) M Gustafsson	7^{7}	6	6
(Italy) A Gaudenzi	5	5	4
11	(South Africa) W Ferreira	7	7	6

Third round
(United Kingdom) T Henman	6	6	6
WC	(United Kingdom) L Milligan	1	3	4
(Sweden) M Gustafsson	7^{7}	7	1	5	6
11	(South Africa) W Ferreira	6^{4}	5	6	7	1

Fourth round
(United Kingdom) T Henman	7^{7}	6	7^{7}
(Sweden) M Gustafsson	6^{2}	4	6^{4}

==== Section 6 ====
First round
13	(United States) T Martin	6	6	6
(South Africa) M Ondruska	3	4	3
(Spain) E Sánchez	1	3	3
Q	(United States) J Grabb	6	6	6
(Italy) R Furlan	6	3	4	6	6
(Ukraine) A Medvedev	4	6	6	2	2
WC	(United Kingdom) C Beecher	6	6	7
WC	(United Kingdom) N Gould	4	4	5
(Morocco) H Arazi	4	6^{4}	6	6	6
(Sweden) N Kulti	6	7^{7}	4	2	3
(Sweden) T Johansson	4	7^{7}	6	3	6
(Netherlands) J Eltingh	6	6^{0}	3	6	1
Q	(United States) J Palmer	6	6	6^{5}	6
Q	(France) T Champion	2	4	7^{7}	3
Q	(United States) D Flach	2	7^{7}	6	7^{8}
3	(United States) A Agassi	6	6^{1}	4	6^{6}

Second round
13	(United States) T Martin	6	6	7^{7}
Q	(United States) J Grabb	2	4	6^{5}
(Italy) R Furlan	6	7	6
WC	(United Kingdom) C Beecher	4	5	2
(Morocco) H Arazi	4	3	3
(Sweden) T Johansson	6	6	6
Q	(United States) J Palmer	6	3	3	4
Q	(United States) D Flach	2	6	6	6

Third round
13	(United States) T Martin	7^{7}	6	6
(Italy) R Furlan	6^{1}	4	2
(Sweden) T Johansson	6	6	6
Q	(United States) D Flach	1	4	3

Fourth round
13	(United States) T Martin	3	6	7	6
(Sweden) T Johansson	6	3	5	2

==== Section 7 ====
First round
8	(United States) J Courier	2	4	6	4
(United States) J Stark	6	6	3	6
(The Bahamas) M Knowles	6	6	6
(France) J Golmard	3	3	1
(Spain) F Mantilla	7	2	2	2
(Netherlands) P Haarhuis	5	6	6	6
WC	(United Kingdom) J Bates	2	3	4
(Venezuela) N Pereira	6	6	6
(Czech Republic) B Ulihrach	1	6	6	6
(Spain) C Costa	6	3	2	3
(Belgium) F Dewulf	3	6	7	6
(United States) V Spadea	6	3	5	4
(Australia) R Fromberg	3	6^{6}	7^{7}	5
(United States) M Washington	6	7^{8}	6^{3}	7
LL	(Canada) A Chang	4	2	1
9	(Sweden) T Enqvist	6	6	6

Second round
(United States) J Stark	6	6	6
(The Bahamas) M Knowles	2	1	2
(Netherlands) P Haarhuis	6	7^{7}	7^{7}
(Venezuela) N Pereira	2	6^{5}	6^{1}
(Czech Republic) B Ulihrach	1	6	6	6
(Belgium) F Dewulf	6	2	1	4
(United States) M Washington	6	7^{7}	6
9	(Sweden) T Enqvist	4	6^{5}	3

Third round
(United States) J Stark	4	7^{8}	1	4
(Netherlands) P Haarhuis	6	6^{6}	6	6
(Czech Republic) B Ulihrach	3	3	0
(United States) M Washington	6	6	6

Fourth round
(Netherlands) P Haarhuis	3	4	2
(United States) M Washington	6	6	6

==== Section 8 ====
First round
15	(France) A Boetsch	3	4	7^{7}	7	7
(Germany) A Rădulescu	6	6	6^{2}	5	9
(Italy) S Pescosolido	6	3	6	7
(United States) C Woodruff	3	6	2	6
(United States) D Wheaton	6	6	6
(Denmark) F Fetterlein	1	4	4
(France) G Raoux	6	6	6
(Morocco) Y El Aynaoui	3	1	3
(South Africa) G Stafford	7	6	6
(Hungary) S Noszály	5	1	2
Q	(South Africa) N Godwin	6	7^{7}	6
(Italy) C Caratti	2	6^{4}	1
(Spain) F Clavet	6^{5}	6	6	4	3
(Spain) T Carbonell	7^{7}	4	1	6	6
(France) J-P Fleurian	0	2	3
2	(Germany) B Becker	6	6	6

Second round
(Germany) A Rădulescu	4	6^{2}	7^{7}	6	10
(Italy) S Pescosolido	6	7^{7}	6^{4}	1	8
(United States) D Wheaton	6	7	7^{7}
(France) G Raoux	4	5	6^{4}
(South Africa) G Stafford	4	5	2
Q	(South Africa) N Godwin	6	7	6
(Spain) T Carbonell	6	3	4	2
2	(Germany) B Becker	4	6	6	6

Third round
(Germany) A Rădulescu	6^{4}	6	6	4	6
(United States) D Wheaton	7^{7}	4	4	6	3
Q	(South Africa) N Godwin	6
2	(Germany) B Becker	6^{r}

Fourth round
(Germany) A Rădulescu	6	6	6
Q	(South Africa) N Godwin	3	0	4

Preceded by 1996 French Open – Men's singles	Grand Slam men's singles	Succeeded by 1996 US Open – Men's singles
