= 1996 Wimbledon Championships – Men's doubles =

Men's doubles
- 1996 Wimbledon Championships

Final
- Champions: (Australia) Todd Woodbridge (Australia) Mark Woodforde
- Runners-up: (Zimbabwe) Byron Black (Canada) Grant Connell
- Score: 4–6, 6–1, 6–3, 6–2

Details
- Draw: 64 (3 Q / 5 WC )
- Seeds: 16

Events
Singles	men	women		boys	girls
Doubles	men	women	mixed	boys	girls
WC Singles	men	women	quad
WC Doubles	men	women	quad
Legends	men	women	seniors
← 1995 ·	Wimbledon Championships	· 1997 →

Three-time defending champions Todd Woodbridge and Mark Woodforde defeated Byron Black and Grant Connell in the final, 4–6, 6–1, 6–3, 6–2 to win the gentlemen's doubles title at the 1996 Wimbledon Championships. It was their fourth Wimbledon title and sixth major title overall.

== Seeds ==
1. (Australia) Todd Woodbridge / (Australia) Mark Woodforde (champions)
2. (The Bahamas) Mark Knowles / (Canada) Daniel Nestor (third round)
3. (Zimbabwe) Byron Black / (Canada) Grant Connell (final)
4. (France) Guy Forget / (Switzerland) Jakob Hlasek (quarterfinals)
5. (United States) Patrick Galbraith / (Russia) Andrei Olhovskiy (third round)
6. (Netherlands) Jacco Eltingh / (Netherlands) Paul Haarhuis (first round)
7. (Canada) Sébastien Lareau / (United States) Alex O'Brien (third round)
8. (South Africa) Ellis Ferreira / (Netherlands) Jan Siemerink (semifinals)
9. (Belgium) Libor Pimek / (South Africa) Byron Talbot (first round)
10. (Sweden) Jonas Björkman / (Sweden) Nicklas Kulti (quarterfinals)
11. (Australia) Mark Philippoussis / (Australia) Patrick Rafter (semifinals)
12. (Spain) Tomás Carbonell / (Spain) Francisco Roig (second round)
13. (Germany) Marc-Kevin Goellner / (Russia) Yevgeny Kafelnikov (third round)
14. (United States) Jared Palmer / (United States) Jonathan Stark (second round)
15. (Czech Republic) Jiří Novák / (Czech Republic) David Rikl (second round)
16. (Netherlands) Hendrik Jan Davids / (Czech Republic) Cyril Suk (second round)

Click on the seed number of a player to go to their draw section.

== Draw ==
=== Key ===
- Q = Qualifier
- WC = Wild card
- LL = Lucky loser
- Alt = Alternate
- ITF = ITF entry
- PR = Protected ranking
- SR = Special ranking
- SE = Special exempt
- JE = Junior exempt
- JR = Junior Accelerator Programme entrant
- CO = College Accelerator Programme entrant
- NG = Next Gen Accelerator Program entrant
- w/o = Walkover
- r = Retired
- d = Defaulted

=== Finals ===
Quarterfinals
1	(Australia) Todd Woodbridge (Australia) Mark Woodforde	7^{7}	6	6
10	(Sweden) Jonas Björkman (Sweden) Nicklas Kulti	6^{4}	2	3
4	(France) Guy Forget (Switzerland) Jakob Hlasek	5	4	7^{7}	4
11	(Australia) Mark Philippoussis (Australia) Patrick Rafter	7	6	6^{4}	6
(United States) Brian MacPhie (Australia) Michael Tebbutt	5	4	6^{6}
3	(Zimbabwe) Byron Black (Canada) Grant Connell	7	6	7^{8}
8	(South Africa) Ellis Ferreira (Netherlands) Jan Siemerink	4	7^{7}	6	6
(France) Jean-Philippe Fleurian (France) Guillaume Raoux	6	6^{1}	1	3

Semifinals
1	(Australia) Todd Woodbridge (Australia) Mark Woodforde	6	7^{12}	7^{7}
11	(Australia) Mark Philippoussis (Australia) Patrick Rafter	3	6^{10}	6^{2}
3	(Zimbabwe) Byron Black (Canada) Grant Connell	6	6	7^{7}
8	(South Africa) Ellis Ferreira (Netherlands) Jan Siemerink	4	2	6^{4}

Final
1	(Australia) Todd Woodbridge (Australia) Mark Woodforde	4	6	6	6
3	(Zimbabwe) Byron Black (Canada) Grant Connell	6	1	3	2

=== Top half ===
==== Section 1 ====
First round
1	(Australia) T Woodbridge (Australia) M Woodforde	6	6	5	6
(United States) K Kinnear (United States) D Randall	4	4	7	1
(United States) M Keil (Sweden) M Larsson	4	6	7^{8}	7
WC	(United Kingdom) A Foster (United Kingdom) P Hand	6	3	6^{6}	5
Q	(North Macedonia) A Kitinov (Austria) G Mandl	6	5	3	4
(United States) J Grabb (United States) R Reneberg	3	7	6	6
(South Africa) D Adams (Germany) D Prinosil	3	1	2
16	(Netherlands) HJ Davids (Czech Republic) C Suk	6	6	6
10	(Sweden) J Björkman (Sweden) N Kulti	7^{7}	6	6
(United States) L Jensen (United States) M Jensen	6^{3}	3	2
(United States) T Kronemann (Australia) D Macpherson	5	4	4
(Australia) P Cash (Australia) S Stolle	7	6	6
(Netherlands) M Oosting (Netherlands) S Schalken	6	6	5	6
(United States) S Davis (Australia) P Kilderry	3	3	7	4
(South Africa) J-L de Jager (New Zealand) B Steven	4	4	4
7	(Canada) S Lareau (United States) A O'Brien	6	6	6

Second round
1	(Australia) T Woodbridge (Australia) M Woodforde	6	6	6
(United States) M Keil (Sweden) M Larsson	3	3	2
(United States) J Grabb (United States) R Reneberg	7^{8}	6	6
16	(Netherlands) HJ Davids (Czech Republic) C Suk	6^{6}	3	2
10	(Sweden) J Björkman (Sweden) N Kulti	6	6	6^{5}	6
(Australia) P Cash (Australia) S Stolle	4	0	7^{7}	1
(Netherlands) M Oosting (Netherlands) S Schalken	6	6^{4}	4	5
7	(Canada) S Lareau (United States) A O'Brien	3	7^{7}	6	7

Third round
1	(Australia) T Woodbridge (Australia) M Woodforde	6	6	6
(United States) J Grabb (United States) R Reneberg	4	2	3
10	(Sweden) J Björkman (Sweden) N Kulti	3	6	6	6
7	(Canada) S Lareau (United States) A O'Brien	6	3	2	3

Quarterfinals
1	(Australia) T Woodbridge (Australia) M Woodforde	7^{7}	6	6
10	(Sweden) J Björkman (Sweden) N Kulti	6^{4}	2	3

==== Section 2 ====
First round
4	(France) G Forget (Switzerland) J Hlasek	6	6	6
(United States) K Jones (Germany) P Kühnen	2	2	4
WC	(United Kingdom) M Petchey (United Kingdom) D Sapsford	6	7^{7}	6
(United States) K Thorne (United States) J Waite	4	6^{2}	2
(Zimbabwe) W Black (Argentina) J Frana	4	4	6	5
(Czech Republic) P Pála (Czech Republic) P Vízner	6	6	2	7
(Australia) J Stoltenberg (Czech Republic) D Vacek	3	6	7^{7}	6^{4}	2
14	(United States) J Palmer (United States) J Stark	6	3	6^{3}	7^{7}	6
11	(Australia) M Philippoussis (Australia) P Rafter	7^{7}	7	7^{7}
(United States) K Flach (United States) D Wheaton	6^{3}	5	6^{2}
WC	(United Kingdom) R Matheson (United Kingdom) T Spinks	6	6	6
(United States) D Johnson (United States) F Montana	4	4	2
(Australia) S Draper (Spain) J Sánchez	4	2	4
Q	(Italy) M Ardinghi (Italy) N Bruno	6	6	6
(Netherlands) T Kempers (Netherlands) T Nijssen	6	6	7^{8}
6	(Netherlands) J Eltingh (Netherlands) P Haarhuis	4	4	6^{6}

Second round
4	(France) G Forget (Switzerland) J Hlasek	6^{7}	6	3	6	6
WC	(United Kingdom) M Petchey (United Kingdom) D Sapsford	7^{9}	4	6	3	4
(Czech Republic) P Pála (Czech Republic) P Vízner	6	1	6	6
14	(United States) J Palmer (United States) J Stark	4	6	3	4
11	(Australia) M Philippoussis (Australia) P Rafter	6	7^{8}	6
WC	(United Kingdom) R Matheson (United Kingdom) T Spinks	3	6^{6}	4
Q	(Italy) M Ardinghi (Italy) N Bruno	5	6^{4}	4
(Netherlands) T Kempers (Netherlands) T Nijssen	7	7^{7}	6

Third round
4	(France) G Forget (Switzerland) J Hlasek	7^{7}	6	6^{5}	6
(Czech Republic) P Pála (Czech Republic) P Vízner	6^{4}	3	7^{7}	2
11	(Australia) M Philippoussis (Australia) P Rafter	2	6	7^{7}	6
(Netherlands) T Kempers (Netherlands) T Nijssen	6	4	6^{2}	1

Quarterfinals
4	(France) G Forget (Switzerland) J Hlasek	5	4	7^{7}	4
11	(Australia) M Philippoussis (Australia) P Rafter	7	6	6^{4}	6

=== Bottom half ===
==== Section 3 ====
First round
5	(United States) P Galbraith (Russia) A Olhovskiy	6	6	6
(Sweden) A Järryd (United States) R Leach	3	3	4
(Sweden) D Ekerot (Hungary) L Markovits	6^{9}	7^{7}	6^{2}	3
(United States) J Belloli (India) L Paes	7^{11}	6^{5}	7^{7}	6
(Australia) J Eagle (Australia) A Florent	6	4	3	7^{7}	11
(United States) B MacPhie (Australia) M Tebbutt	3	6	6	6^{5}	13
(Australia) W Arthurs (Australia) A Kratzmann	1	7	7^{7}	6^{5}	7
12	(Spain) T Carbonell (Spain) F Roig	6	5	6^{5}	7^{7}	9
13	(Germany) M-K Goellner (Russia) Y Kafelnikov	6	6^{6}	7	6^{2}	11
(United States) B Behrens (United States) M Lucena	4	7^{8}	5	7^{7}	9
(Czech Republic) M Damm (Sweden) P Nyborg	4	4	3
(Italy) D Nargiso (Venezuela) N Pereira	6	6	6
WC	(United Kingdom) J Bates (United Kingdom) C Wilkinson	6	7	6
WC	(United Kingdom) J Delgado (United Kingdom) L Milligan	1	5	0
(Argentina) P Albano (Hungary) G Köves	4	4	4
3	(Zimbabwe) B Black (Canada) G Connell	6	6	6

Second round
5	(United States) P Galbraith (Russia) A Olhovskiy	6	7	6
(United States) J Belloli (India) L Paes	2	5	2
(United States) B MacPhie (Australia) M Tebbutt	6	6	6
12	(Spain) T Carbonell (Spain) F Roig	4	2	4
13	(Germany) M-K Goellner (Russia) Y Kafelnikov	7^{7}	7	7^{7}
(Italy) D Nargiso (Venezuela) N Pereira	6^{5}	5	6^{5}
WC	(United Kingdom) J Bates (United Kingdom) C Wilkinson	4	7	3	3
3	(Zimbabwe) B Black (Canada) G Connell	6	5	6	6

Third round
5	(United States) P Galbraith (Russia) A Olhovskiy	3	4	4
(United States) B MacPhie (Australia) M Tebbutt	6	6	6
13	(Germany) M-K Goellner (Russia) Y Kafelnikov	4	6	4	7^{7}	7
3	(Zimbabwe) B Black (Canada) G Connell	6	4	6	6^{2}	9

Quarterfinals
(United States) B MacPhie (Australia) M Tebbutt	5	4	6^{6}
3	(Zimbabwe) B Black (Canada) G Connell	7	6	7^{8}

==== Section 4 ====
First round
8	(South Africa) E Ferreira (Netherlands) J Siemerink	6	7^{9}	6
(United Kingdom) T Henman (South Africa) G Muller	4	6^{7}	4
(South Africa) L Bale (Netherlands) S Noteboom	3	4	6^{2}
(Switzerland) L Manta (United Kingdom) A Richardson	6	6	7^{7}
(Germany) M Huning (Australia) J Ireland	3	6^{5}	6^{3}
(Spain) JA Conde (Spain) À Corretja	6	7^{7}	7^{7}
Q	(United States) D DiLucia (United States) S Humphries	6^{12}	7^{7}	6	7^{7}
9	(Belgium) L Pimek (South Africa) B Talbot	7^{14}	6^{2}	2	6^{4}
15	(Czech Republic) J Novák (Czech Republic) D Rikl	6	6^{10}	3	6	9
(South Africa) M Barnard (United States) G Van Emburgh	3	7^{12}	6	3	7
(France) J-P Fleurian (France) G Raoux	7^{8}	6	6^{7}	3	6
(South Africa) M Ondruska (Australia) P Tramacchi	6^{6}	3	7^{9}	6	3
(Sweden) R Bergh (United States) S Cannon	6	3	4	6	6
(South Africa) B Haygarth (South Africa) C van Rensburg	3	6	6	4	2
(United Kingdom) N Broad (South Africa) P Norval	6	3	4	4
2	(The Bahamas) M Knowles (Canada) D Nestor	4	6	6	6

Second round
8	(South Africa) E Ferreira (Netherlands) J Siemerink	6	6	7^{7}
(Switzerland) L Manta (United Kingdom) A Richardson	3	4	6^{5}
(Spain) JA Conde (Spain) À Corretja	6^{5}	6	7^{7}	5	6
Q	(United States) D DiLucia (United States) S Humphries	7^{7}	4	6^{5}	7	4
15	(Czech Republic) J Novák (Czech Republic) D Rikl	3	6^{4}	3
(France) J-P Fleurian (France) G Raoux	6	7^{7}	6
(Sweden) R Bergh (United States) S Cannon	3	6	6^{3}	3
2	(The Bahamas) M Knowles (Canada) D Nestor	6	3	7^{7}	6

Third round
8	(South Africa) E Ferreira (Netherlands) J Siemerink	7^{7}	6	6
(Spain) JA Conde (Spain) À Corretja	6^{2}	4	4
(France) J-P Fleurian (France) G Raoux	7^{7}	4	6	6
2	(The Bahamas) M Knowles (Canada) D Nestor	6^{4}	6	4	4

Quarterfinals
8	(South Africa) E Ferreira (Netherlands) J Siemerink	4	7^{7}	6	6
(France) J-P Fleurian (France) G Raoux	6	6^{1}	1	3
