= Lorenzo Manta =

Swiss tennis player

- Country (sports): Switzerland
- Residence: Winterthur, Switzerland
- Born: September 16, 1974 (age 50); Winterthur, Switzerland
- Height: 6 ft 3 in (191 cm)
- Turned pro: 1992
- Retired: 2001
- Plays: Right-handed
- Prize money: $429,102

Singles
- Career record: 11–30
- Career titles: 0
- Highest ranking: No. 103 (12 June 2000)

Grand Slam singles results
- Australian Open: 1R (2000)
- French Open: Q1 (1999, 2000, 2001)
- Wimbledon: 4R (1999)
- US Open: 2R (2009)

Doubles
- Career record: 24–29
- Career titles: 0
- Highest ranking: No. 82 (9 July 2001)

Grand Slam doubles results
- Australian Open: 1R (2000)
- French Open: 3R (2001)
- Wimbledon: 2R (1996)
- US Open: 2R (2000)

Mixed doubles
- Career record: 2–2
- Career titles: 0

Grand Slam mixed doubles results
- Wimbledon: 2R (1996, 2001)

Lorenzo Manta (born 16 September 1974 in Winterthur) is a former tennis player from Switzerland, who turned professional in 1992. The right-hander reached his highest ATP singles ranking of World No. 103 in June 2000. His best achievement in the grand slam tournaments was reaching the fourth round at Wimbledon in 1999. There, he had a big upset win over the 1996 Wimbledon champion, Richard Krajicek, in the third round in five sets. Manta was then defeated by Brazil's Gustavo Kuerten in the fourth round. He was 4–0 in Davis Cup doubles matches with Roger Federer.

Both his father Leonardo and his sister Joana also played tennis professionally.

== Career finals ==
=== Doubles (1 loss) ===
Result	W/L	Date	Tournament	Surface	Partner	Opponents	Score
Loss	0–1	Sep 1999	Tashkent, Uzbekistan	Hard	(United States) Mark Keil	(Uzbekistan) Oleg Ogorodov (Switzerland) Marc Rosset	6–7^{(4–7)}, 6–7^{(1–7)}
