= Jocelyn Robichaud =

Canadian tennis player

- Country (sports): Canada
- Residence: Montreal
- Born: 8 April 1978 (age 47) Joliette, Quebec, Canada
- Turned pro: 1997
- Plays: Right-handed
- Prize money: $107,888

Singles
- Career record: 1–3
- Career titles: 0; 0 Challenger, 0 Futures
- Highest ranking: No. 384 (27 October 1997)

Grand Slam singles results
- Australian Open: Q1 (1995, 1996)
- Wimbledon: Q1 (1995)

Doubles
- Career record: 7–17
- Career titles: 0; 3 Challenger, 5 Futures
- Highest ranking: No. 119 (1 May 2010)

Grand Slam doubles results
- French Open: 1R (2000)
- Wimbledon: 1R (2000)
- US Open: Q2 (2000)
- Last updated on: 14 January 2022.

Jocelyn Robichaud (born 8 April 1978 in Joliette, Quebec) is a former tour professional tennis player. Robichaud captured three junior Grand Slam titles and played Davis Cup for Canada. More of a doubles specialist, he won three Challenger events in doubles and reached a career-high ATP doubles ranking of World No. 119.

== Junior tennis ==
Robichaud won his first of three Grand Slams in doubles partnering Jong-min Lee, as the tandem defeated the Dutch duo of Raemon Sluiter and Peter Wessels in the final of the 1995 U.S. Open, 7–6, 6–2. After winning the Victorian Junior Championships and Australian Hardcourt Junior Championship, Robichaud and partner Daniele Bracciali captured the 1996 Australian Open junior title, defeating Bob and Mike Bryan in the final, 3–6, 6–3, 6–3. Robichaud partnered Martin Verkerk at the next major and the pair reached the semi-finals of the 1996 French Open. He rejoined Bracciali to win his third junior slam as the duo captured the 1996 Wimbledon Championship by dispensing of the South African pair of Damien Roberts and Wesley Whitehouse in the final, 6–3, 7–6. Bracciali and Robichaud nearly made it a third Grand Slam title together but fell in the final of the 1996 U.S. Open to the Bryan twins, 7–5, 3–6, 4–6. Robichaud reached an ITF junior doubles ranking of World No. 1, in December, 1995.

In singles, Robichaud's best results were reaching the third round of the 1995 Australian Open, the quarter-finals of the junior 1995 Italian Open, and the third round of the 1996 Wimbledon Championship. His career-high ITF Junior singles ranking was World No. 11, which he reached in December, 1995.

== Senior tennis ==
Rochichaud captured the Aptos Challenger twice in succession – in 1996 and 1997 – both times partnering fellow Québécois Sébastien Leblanc. His third Challenger title was winning the 1999 drkoop.com USTA Challenger of Miami, partnering Miles Wakefield. In addition, Robichaud captured an additional 5 ITF Futures tennis event titles. His career (main draw) match win–loss doubles record at Challenger level was 43 and 33, while at ATP Tour and Grand Slam level it was 6 wins, 15 losses. His best top-flight result were reaching the quarter-finals of the 1997 Canadian Open, partnering Tommy Haas. In fact, all 6 of his ATP Tour match wins occurred at his home country's major tournament. Rochibaud appeared in the main draw of a Grand Slam event twice as a senior, both times in doubles, at the 2000 French Open, partnering Jack Waite, and Wimbledon, with Michael Sell. He and Waite lost in straight sets while he and Sell lost 8–10 in the fifth set to Marc-Kevin Goellner and Jan Siemerink.

As for singles, the highlights of Rochibaud's time on tour were winning his first senior-level match, at age 18, to World No. 627 Sergio Gómez-Barrio 6–3, 6–4 while taking Quebec tennis star and World No. 160 Sébastien Lareau in his second match to a second set tie-break, at the 1994 Montebello Challenger; reaching the final of Canada F1 in June, 1998 followed by the semi-final of Canada F2 the following week; reaching the final of Greece F2 in May, 2001; and reaching the semi-final of Canada F3, in June, 2001. The sole ATP Tour event he competed in over the years, in a main draw, was the Canadian Open, in which he made 3 appearances, going 0 and 3. In Challengers, he had 1 match win (the one over Gómez-Barrio) and 7 defeats, including going 0–5 at the Granby Challenger, while in Futures events he had a winning record of 39 and 33. His career-high singles ATP ranking was World No. 384, which he reached in October, 1997.

=== Davis Cup ===
Robichaud appeared in rubbers in 4 Canadian Davis Cup ties, all of which Canada lost. He got his first match action winning a dead singles rubber in a tie lost away to Ecuador, 2–3, in April 1998 American Group I semifinal action. He defeated a young Giovanni Lapentti 6–3, 7–6^{(2)}. In February 1999, in the quarter-finals of American Group I, Robichaud won his second Davis Cup match, teaming with star Canadian doubles player Daniel Nestor to defeat the Colombian duo of Mauricio Hadad and Miguel Tobón 7–6^{(5)}, 6–7^{(4)}, 6–7^{(3)}, 6–0, 6–4. Canada lost this away tie too, 2–3.

The following year, Canada again faced a South American opponent away in the zonal group I quarter-finals and lost, this time to Chile, 1–4. Robichaud again played the doubles tie, this time partnering Sébastien Lareau – they lost to Fernando González and Nicolás Massú, 4–6, 4–6, 6–2, 2–6. Then his fourth and final Davis Cup rubber was a doubles loss with Fred Niemeyer, to the Argentine Davis Cup team of Agustín Calleri and Mariano Puerta, 6–7^{(5)}, 3–6, 4–6, in a 2001 American Group I semifinal match-up.

== Post-playing career ==
In 2008, Robichaud captained Canada's youth Davis Cup team, and was a youth coach for Tennis Canada at its national training centre at Uniprix Stadium.

== Junior Grand Slam finals ==
=== Doubles: 4 (3 titles, 1 runner-up) ===
Result	Year	Tournament	Surface	Partner	Opponents	Score
Win	1995	US Open	Hard	(South Korea) Lee Jong-min	(Netherlands) Raemon Sluiter (Netherlands) Peter Wessels	7–6, 6–2
Win	1996	Australian Open	Hard	(Italy) Daniele Bracciali	(United Kingdom) Martin Lee (United Kingdom) James Trotman	6–2, 6–4
Win	1996	Wimbledon	Grass	(Italy) Daniele Bracciali	(South Africa) Damien Roberts (South Africa) Wesley Whitehouse	6–2, 6–4
Loss	1996	US Open	Hard	(Italy) Daniele Bracciali	(United States) Bob Bryan (United States) Mike Bryan	7–5, 3–6, 4–6

== ATP Challenger and ITF Futures finals ==
=== Singles: 2 (0–2) ===
Legend ATP Challenger (0–0) ITF Futures (0–2)	Finals by surface Hard (0–2) Clay (0–0) Grass (0–0) Carpet (0–0)

Result	W–L	Date	Tournament	Tier	Surface	Opponent	Score
Loss	0–1	Jun 1998	Canada F1, Mississauga	Futures	Hard	(Canada) Emin Agaev	4–6, 2–6
Loss	0–2	May 2001	Greece F2, Kalamata	Futures	Hard	(Slovenia) Marko Tkalec	1–6, 4–6

=== Doubles: 14 (8–6) ===
Legend ATP Challenger (3–3) ITF Futures (5–3)	Finals by surface Hard (8–4) Clay (0–2) Grass (0–0) Carpet (0–0)

Result	W–L	Date	Tournament	Tier	Surface	Partner	Opponents	Score
Win	1–0	Jul 1996	Aptos, United States	Challenger	Hard	(Canada) Sébastien Leblanc	(South Africa) Neville Godwin (United States) Geoff Grant	7–6, 6–7, 7–5
Win	2–0	Jul 1997	Aptos, United States	Challenger	Hard	(Canada) Sébastien Leblanc	(United States) David Caldwell (United States) Adam Peterson	7–6, 6–4
Loss	2–1	Jun 1998	USA F4, Tallahassee	Futures	Clay	(United States) Michael Russell	(United States) Cecil Mamiit (United Kingdom) Kyle Spencer	6–3, 2–6, 1–6
Loss	2–2	Jun 1998	Canada F1, Mississauga	Futures	Hard	(United States) Michael Russell	(Lebanon) Ali Hamadeh (United States) Todd Meringoff	4–6, 7–6, 3–6
Win	3–2	Jun 1998	Canada F2, Montreal	Futures	Hard	(Canada) Simon Larose	(Germany) Jan-Ralph Brandt (United States) Michael Russell	6–3, 6–4
Loss	3–3	Jan 1999	India F2, Ahmedabad	Futures	Hard	(Canada) Simon Larose	(United States) Andrew Rueb (United States) Todd Meringoff	6–7, 3–6
Loss	3–4	Oct 1999	Houston, United States	Challenger	Hard	(Canada) Bobby Kokavec	(United States) David Di Lucia (United States) Michael Sell	6–7, 0–6
Win	4–4	Nov 1999	Miami, United States	Challenger	Hard	(South Africa) Myles Wakefield	(United States) Bob Bryan (United States) Mike Bryan	7–5, 4–6, 6–2
Win	5–4	Nov 1999	USA F19, Grenelefe	Futures	Hard	(Canada) Bobby Kokavec	(France) Cedric Kauffmann (United Kingdom) Miles Maclagan	4–6, 7–5, 6–1
Loss	5–5	Feb 2000	Wrocław, Poland	Challenger	Hard	(United Kingdom) Kyle Spencer	(Czech Republic) Petr Kovačka (Czech Republic) Pavel Kudrnáč	6–3, 6–7^{(6–8)}, 4–6
Loss	5–6	Apr 2000	San Luis Potosí, Mexico	Challenger	Clay	(United States) Michael Sell	(Venezuela) José de Armas (Venezuela) Jimy Szymanski	7–5, 4–6, 2–6
Win	6–6	Jan 2001	USA F3, Hallandale Beach	Futures	Hard	(Canada) Frédéric Niemeyer	(Israel) Noam Behr (Italy) Giorgio Galimberti	7–6^{(7–4)}, 6–3
Win	7–6	Mar 2001	New Zealand F3, Tauranga	Futures	Hard	(South Africa) Wesley Whitehouse	(Australia) Mark Draper (Hong Kong) John Hui	6–3, 6–3
Win	8–6	May 2001	Greece F1, Chalkida	Futures	Hard	(Canada) Philip Gubenco	(Croatia) Ivan Cerović (Slovenia) Marko Tkalec	6–3, 7–5

== Sources ==
- ITF Junior profile page
- ITF Junior activity page (adjust filter to between 1993 and 1997)
- Jocelyn Robichaud at the Association of Tennis Professionals
- Jocelyn Robichaud at the Davis Cup (archived)
