= Rodolfo Rake =

Peruvian tennis player

- Country (sports): Peru; United States
- Residence: Fort Lauderdale, Florida, U.S.
- Born: 13 July 1979 (age 45); Lima, Peru
- Plays: Right-handed
- Prize money: $39,070

Singles
- Career record: 0-1
- Career titles: 0
- Highest ranking: No. 353 (29 May 2000)

Grand Slam singles results
- US Open: 1R (1997)

Doubles
- Highest ranking: No. 501 (21 Jun 1999)

Rodolfo "Rudy" Rake (born 13 July 1979) is a former professional tennis player from Peru.

== Career ==
Rake, who was born in Lima, moved to Florida in 1993. He was a top ranking junior in the United States and finished runner-up in the 1997 "18 and Under" Orange Bowl, losing the final to Nicolas Massu.

He received a wildcard to play in the main draw of the 1997 US Open and faced the Czech Republic's Bohdan Ulihrach in the opening round. Rake was beaten in straight sets.
