= Damien Roberts =

South African tennis player

- Full name: Damien Roberts
- Country (sports): South Africa
- Born: 26 January 1978 (age 47)
- Prize money: $56,811

Singles
- Career record: 0–0
- Highest ranking: No. 273 (2 August 1999)

Grand Slam singles results
- Australian Open: Q1 (1999)
- Wimbledon: Q1 (1998, 1999)
- US Open: Q1 (1998, 1999)

Doubles
- Career record: 0–2
- Highest ranking: No. 152 (18 September 2000)

Grand Slam doubles results
- Wimbledon: 1R (1999)
- US Open: Q1 (1998)

Damien Roberts (born 26 January 1978) is a South African former professional tennis player.

== Biography ==
Roberts went to Kearsney College until 1994, when he moved to the United States to train at the John Newcombe Tennis Academy in Texas. He attended New Braunfels High School.

As a junior, he was ranked as high as 11 in the world in doubles and was a finalist in the 1996 Wimbledon Championships with countryman Wesley Whitehouse.

From 1996 to 2001, Roberts competed professionally on the international tennis circuit, mostly in ATP Challenger tournaments. He won a total of five Challenger titles during his career, all in doubles.

Most notably he competed in the main draw of the 1999 Wimbledon Championships. He was eliminated in the opening round of qualifying in the singles and only narrowly missed qualification in the men's doubles, he and partner Amir Hadad lost the final qualifier in five sets. However the pair received a lucky loser entry into the main draw, where they lost in the first round to South Africans David Adams and John-Laffnie de Jager.

He appeared in the main draw of one ATP Tour event, the doubles at the 2001 Mercedes Cup in Stuttgart. Partnering Marcus Hilpert, they lost to Julian Knowle and Lorenzo Manta in the first round.

For many years after retiring he worked at the Lawn Tennis Association in England as the head of physical training and a national tennis coach. Due to his role with the Great Britain Fed Cup team and as national women's coach, he was also involved the development of Laura Robson and Heather Watson. He is now the Director of Performance Tennis at TennisGear in Brisbane, Australia.

== Challenger titles ==
=== Doubles: (5) ===
No.	Year	Tournament	Surface	Partner	Opponents	Score
1.	1998	Gramado, Brazil	Hard	(South Africa) Jeff Coetzee	(Brazil) Francisco Costa (Japan) Gouichi Motomura	7–5, 6–3
2.	1999	Singapore	Hard	(South Africa) Jeff Coetzee	(Uzbekistan) Oleg Ogorodov (Israel) Eyal Ran	7–5, 6–3
3.	2000	Bristol, Great Britain	Grass	(Australia) Jordan Kerr	(Israel) Noam Behr (Israel) Eyal Erlich	6–3, 1–6, 6–3
4.	2000	Bressanone, Italy	Clay	(Australia) Jordan Kerr	(Argentina) Diego del Río (Argentina) Marcelo Charpentier	7–63, 7–5
5.	2000	Manerbio, Italy	Clay	(Australia) Jordan Kerr	(Portugal) Bernardo Mota (Slovakia) Ladislav Švarc	7–61, 6–4
