= Jitka Schönfeldová =

Czech tennis player

Jitka Veselá
- Full name: Jitka Veselá Schönfeldová
- Country (sports): Czech Republic
- Born: 9 August 1980 (age 45) Prague, Czechoslovakia
- Plays: Right-handed

Singles
- Highest ranking: No. 469 (12 June 2000)

Doubles
- Highest ranking: No. 475 (14 July 1997)

Jitka Veselá (born 9 August 1980, Schönfeldová) is a former professional tennis player from the Czech Republic.

== Biography ==
A right-handed player from Prague, Schönfeldová was a top junior player, finishing 1996 as the joint ITF World Champion for girls' doubles, with regular partner Michaela Paštiková. The pair teamed up to win the 1996 Australian Open and also claimed the Orange Bowl title that year.

Schönfeldová's only main draw appearance on the WTA Tour came at the 1996 Czech Open, where she and Alena Vašková competed as qualifiers. Injuries limited her professional career and she left the tour in 2000.

After retiring from professional tennis, Schönfeldová played collegiate tennis in the United States, first at Flagler College in Florida, before joining the University of Georgia in 2004, where she studied journalism.

== ITF finals ==
$25,000 tournaments
$10,000 tournaments

=== Singles (2–1) ===
Outcome	No.	Date	Tournament	Surface	Opponent	Score
Winner	1.	10 August 1997	Paderborn, Germany	Clay	(Czech Republic) Jana Macurová	6–1, 7–6
Runner-up	2.	1 August 1999	Horb, Germany	Clay	(Czech Republic) Jana Hlaváčková	4–6, 7–6, 1–6
Winner	3.	4 June 2000	Staré Splavy, Czech Republic	Clay	(Czech Republic) Renata Voráčová	6–4, 7–6^{(8)}

=== Doubles (0–1) ===
Outcome	No.	Date	Tournament	Surface	Partner	Opponents	Score
Runner-up	1.	12 August 1996	Lohmar, Germany	Clay	(Czech Republic) Michaela Paštiková	(Czech Republic) Jana Pospíšilová (Czech Republic) Alena Vašková	7–6^{(1)}, 3–6, 3–6
