= Jaymon Crabb =

Australian tennis player

- Country (sports): Australia
- Residence: Perth, Western Australia
- Born: 6 March 1978 (age 48) Bunbury, Australia
- Height: 193 cm (6 ft 4 in)
- Turned pro: 1997
- Plays: Right-handed
- Prize money: $184,842

Singles
- Career record: 1–8
- Career titles: 0
- Highest ranking: No. 181 (17 Feb 2003)

Grand Slam singles results
- Australian Open: 2R (2003)

Doubles
- Career record: 0–5
- Career titles: 0
- Highest ranking: No. 146 (28 Oct 2002)

Grand Slam doubles results
- Australian Open: 1R (1997, 2002, 2003)

Mixed doubles
- Career titles: 0

Grand Slam mixed doubles results
- Australian Open: 1R (2003)
- Wimbledon: 1R (2003)

Jaymon Crabb (born 6 March 1978) is a former professional tennis player from Australia.

He is the brother of Jaxon Crabb, who played for the West Coast Eagles and Port Adelaide in the Australian Football League.

== Career ==
Crabb was a semi-finalist in the boys' singles event at the 1996 Wimbledon Championships and was junior winner of the Queen's Club Championships that year.

He made his first senior Grand Slam appearance in the 1997 Australian Open, where he was defeated in the opening round by Leander Paes. In 2002, he returned to the Australian Open and although he again exited in the first round, he did manage to take a set off a previous finalist, Marcelo Ríos. The following year, he beat countryman Andrew Ilie in four sets to register his first win in the Australian Open. He was eliminated from the tournament in the second round by David Nalbandian. In each of his three appearances at the event, he also competed in the men's doubles, with different partners each time: Richard Fromberg, Todd Larkham and Peter Luczak. He also twice played Grand Slam mixed doubles, at both the Australian Open and Wimbledon in 2003, partnering his future wife Bryanne Stewart.

== Challenger titles ==
=== Doubles: (3) ===
| No. | Year | Tournament | Surface | Partner | Opponents | Score |
|---|---|---|---|---|---|---|
| 1. | 1997 | Pörtschach, Austria | Clay | (Sweden) Mikael Stadling | (Australia) Dejan Petrovic (Australia) Grant Silcock | 7–5, 6–3 |
| 2. | 2002 | Hamilton, New Zealand | Hard | (Australia) Peter Luczak | (Switzerland) Yves Allegro (South Africa) Justin Bower | 7–5, 6–4 |
| 3. | 2002 | Seoul, South Korea | Hard | (New Zealand) Mark Nielsen | (Argentina) Federico Browne (Netherlands) Rogier Wassen | W/O |
