= Geoff Abrams =

American tennis player (born 1978)

- Born: May 10, 1978 (age 48) Newport Beach, California, U.S.
- Turned pro: June 2000
- Retired: November 2001
- Plays: Right-handed
- College: Stanford University

Geoff Abrams (born May 10, 1978) is an American former tennis player.

Abrams was ranked # 1 in the U.S. in the Boys 14s singles in 1992. In 1994, he finished the year ranked # 1 in doubles in the USTA Boys' 16 rankings with Michael Russell. That year he was also the Boys 16 Doubles National Champion. In 1995, he was the USTA National Indoor 18 Champion. He competed in the 1996 juniors in the U.S. Open, French Open, and at Wimbledon.

Playing in college for Stanford University, he had a 26–0 record in singles in 1998, the best in Stanford men's tennis history. He was an All-American in singles and doubles in his senior year, as well as the Pac-10 Champion. That year he was also part of the # 1-ranked college doubles team in the nation, and the 8th-ranked college player in the U.S. in singles. His college team won the NCAA national championship his freshman, sophomore, and senior years.

Abrams as a professional had a high ranking in singles of 501, on July 16, 2001, and a high ranking in doubles of 397, on August 6, 2001.

== Biography ==
Abrams is the son of Nancy, a travel consultant, and Gil, an engineer. He grew up in Newport Beach, California.

At 11 years of age, he was already 6 feet (1.8 m) tall. Because of Abrams' height, parents of some of his opponents insisted on seeing his birth certificate. By the age of 13 he was 6 feet 3.5 inches (1.918 m) tall, and by the age of 14 he could serve a tennis ball at 118 miles per hour (190 km/h).

=== Junior tennis career ===
Abrams was ranked # 1 in the U.S. in the Boys 14s singles in 1992. In March 1992, he defeated Bob Bryan in the finals of the Long Beach Junior. He defeated him again in the semifinals of the Easter Bowl Junior Boys 14 Singles Tennis Championship, which he went on to win. He then won an Ojai Tennis Tournament title by defeating Bob's brother Mike Bryan in the semi-finals, and Bob in the title match. In April 1993 he won his second consecutive Ojai title.

In 1994, he finished the year ranked No. 1 in doubles in the USTA boys' 16 rankings with Michael Russell, and was the Boys 16 Doubles National Champion. He won the 1994 USTA National Boys' 16 Championships doubles title with Russell.

In 1995, he was the USTA National Indoor 18 Champion, and reached the doubles final with Russell at the 1995 USTA National Boys' 18 Clay Court Championships. He competed in the juniors in the 1996 U.S. Open, French Open, and at Wimbledon.

=== High school and college tennis careers ===
Abrams starred in tennis at Newport Harbor High School, from which he graduated in 1996. He also attended Palmer Tennis Academy.

He then attended Stanford University where he had a 26–0 record in singles in 1998, the best record in Stanford men's tennis history, and was an All-American in singles and doubles in his senior year. In 1998, he also won the Mercedes Benz Cup Wild Card. That year he also won the USTA Amateur Champions Men's Doubles, with Edward Carter.

In his senior year in 2000 he was named to the USA Tennis Collegiate Team – an elite training program for the top American college players, was the Pac-10 Champion, and the eighth-ranked college player in the U.S. And – along with teammate Alex Kim – he was part of the top-ranked doubles team in the nation, which also was named the ITA National Doubles Team of the Year. He was team captain that year, and also received Pac-10 Co-Player of the Year honors. Abrams became the first player in the Pac-10 tournament's 100-year history to win the boys' 14, 16, California Interscholastic Federation, and men's Pacific 10 singles titles. Stanford's head coach Dick Gould said in April 2000: "He has the best winning percentage ever, of anyone who's been here four years. He's risen from 5 or 6 on the team to No. 2 in singles, and from No. 3 in doubles to No. 1 in the country." The team won the NCAA championships his freshman, sophomore, and senior years (1997, 1998, and 2000).

At Stanford he was pre-med, and had a 3.3 grade point average, but his coach said he might never reach his full tennis potential due to his pre-med career. Abrams graduated in 2000 with a B.A. in Human Biology – Neuroscience.

=== Pro career ===
After graduating from Stanford, Abrams began playing in the Futures circuit. In June 2000, he won the doubles title with Alex Kim at the USTA Chandler Cup Futures. He also won the 2000 Pomona Valley Hospital Medical Center USTA Pro Classic in Claremont, California.

Abrams had a high ranking in singles of 501, on July 16, 2001. His high ranking in doubles was 397, on August 6, 2001. He finished his pro career in November 2001 with one singles title and two doubles titles.

=== Post-tennis ===
Abrams attended the University of California, San Diego, from 2003 to 2007, where he obtained an M.D. In 2009, Abrams was back at Stanford as an intern at Stanford Hospital, where he completed his residency in orthopedic surgery, and thereafter he trained further in orthopedic sports medicine and shoulder surgery at Rush University Medical Center in Chicago, Illinois. He specializes in sports medicine and arthroscopy, upper extremity joint replacement, and ligament reconstructive surgery of the shoulder, knee, hip, and elbow.
