= 1996 Wimbledon Championships =

- Date: 24 June – 7 July
- Edition: 110th
- Category: Grand Slam (ITF)
- Draw: 128S/64D/64XD
- Prize money: £6,465,910
- Surface: Grass
- Location: Church Road; SW19, Wimbledon, London, United Kingdom
- Venue: All England Lawn Tennis and Croquet Club

Champions

Men's singles
- (Netherlands) Richard Krajicek

Women's singles
- (Germany) Steffi Graf

Men's doubles
- (Australia) Todd Woodbridge / (Australia) Mark Woodforde

Women's doubles
- (Switzerland) Martina Hingis / (Czech Republic) Helena Suková

Mixed doubles
- (Czech Republic) Cyril Suk / (Czech Republic) Helena Suková

Boys' singles
- (Belarus) Vladimir Voltchkov

Girls' singles
- (France) Amélie Mauresmo

Boys' doubles
- (Italy) Daniele Bracciali / (Canada) Jocelyn Robichaud

Girls' doubles
- (Belarus) Olga Barabanschikova / (France) Amélie Mauresmo

Gentlemen's invitation doubles
- (Poland) Wojciech Fibak / (United States) Tim Wilkison

Ladies' invitation doubles
- (United Kingdom) Jo Durie / (United States) Anne Smith

Senior gentlemen's invitation doubles
- (Australia) John Alexander / (United States) Sherwood Stewart
← 1995 ·	Wimbledon Championships	· 1997 →

The 1996 Wimbledon Championships was a tennis tournament played on grass courts at the All England Lawn Tennis and Croquet Club in Wimbledon, London in the United Kingdom. It was the 110th edition of the Wimbledon Championships and was held from 24 June to 7 July 1996.

== Events ==
When rain interrupted play on Centre Court on 3 July with a crowd that included Prince Michael of Kent, Princess Michael of Kent and actress Joanna Lumley, Cliff Richard, who was watching from the royal box, was approached by court officials for an interview. They suggested that he sing a song or two to entertain the crowd. With approval from his PR manager Richard proceeded to give an impromptu performance, starting with "Summer Holiday".

The performance ran for twenty minutes and consisted of Richard's hits such as "Living Doll" and "Congratulations", as well as the Elvis Presley hit "All Shook Up". Past tennis stars Virginia Wade, Martina Navratilova, Hana Mandlíková, Pam Shriver, Liz Smylie, Gigi Fernández and Conchita Martínez were in the Royal Box and proceeded to join in as background singers.

Richard was not aware that his performance was televised by the BBC, and after six songs presenter Des Lynam jokingly claimed "we'll probably get one hell of a bill." The performance made the front pages in many major British newspapers on the following day. Since a retractable roof was completed on Centre Court in 2009 such a performance is unlikely to happen again.

During the entrance of the court staff for the Men's Singles final, the court was briefly invaded by a streaker.

== Prize money ==
The total prize money for 1996 championships was £6,465,910. The winner of the men's title earned £392,500 while the women's singles champion earned £353,000.

Event	W	F	SF	QF	Round of 16	Round of 32	Round of 64	Round of 128
Men's singles	£392,500							
Women's singles	£353,000							
Men's doubles *	£160,810							—
Women's doubles *	£139,040							—
Mixed doubles *	£68,280							—

_{* per team}

== Champions ==
=== Seniors ===
==== Men's singles ====
(Netherlands) Richard Krajicek defeated (United States) MaliVai Washington, 6–3, 6–4, 6–3

- It was Krajicek's 1st and only career Grand Slam singles title. He became the first Dutchman to win a Grand Slam singles title and the first Dutch singles winner since Kea Bouman in 1926.

==== Women's singles ====
(Germany) Steffi Graf defeated (Spain) Arantxa Sánchez Vicario, 6–3, 7–5

- It was Graf's 20th career Grand Slam singles title and her 7th and last title at Wimbledon.

==== Men's doubles ====
(Australia) Todd Woodbridge / (Australia) Mark Woodforde defeated (Zimbabwe) Byron Black / (Canada) Grant Connell, 4–6, 6–1, 6–3, 6–2

- It was Woodbridge's 10th career Grand Slam title and his 5th Wimbledon title. It was Woodforde's 11th career Grand Slam title and his 4th Wimbledon title.

==== Women's doubles ====
(Switzerland) Martina Hingis / (Czech Republic) Helena Suková defeated (United States) Meredith McGrath / (Latvia) Larisa Neiland, 5–7, 7–5, 6–1

- It was Hingis' 1st career Grand Slam doubles title. It was Suková's 9th and last career Grand Slam doubles title and her 4th title at Wimbledon.

==== Mixed doubles ====
(Czech Republic) Cyril Suk / (Czech Republic) Helena Suková defeated (Australia) Mark Woodforde / (Latvia) Larisa Neiland, 1–6, 6–3, 6–2

- It was Suk's 3rd career Grand Slam mixed doubles title and his 2nd title at Wimbledon. It was Suková's 4th career Grand Slam mixed doubles title and her 2nd title at Wimbledon.

=== Juniors ===
==== Boys' singles ====
(Belarus) Vladimir Voltchkov defeated (Croatia) Ivan Ljubičić, 3–6, 6–2, 6–3

==== Girls' singles ====
(France) Amélie Mauresmo defeated (Spain) Magüi Serna, 4–6, 6–3, 6–4

==== Boys' doubles ====
(Italy) Daniele Bracciali / (Canada) Jocelyn Robichaud defeated (South Africa) Damien Roberts / (South Africa) Wesley Whitehouse, 6–2, 6–4

==== Girls' doubles ====
(Belarus) Olga Barabanschikova / (France) Amélie Mauresmo defeated (United States) Lilia Osterloh / (United States) Samantha Reeves, 5–7, 6–3, 6–1

=== Invitation ===
==== Gentlemen's invitation doubles ====
(Poland) Wojciech Fibak / (United States) Tim Wilkison defeated (Czech Republic) Pavel Složil / (Czech Republic) Tomáš Šmíd, 6–2, 5–7, 6–1

==== Ladies' invitation doubles ====
(United Kingdom) Jo Durie / (United States) Anne Smith defeated (Slovenia) Mima Jaušovec / (South Africa) Yvonne Vermaak, 6–3, 6–2

==== Senior gentlemen's invitation doubles ====
(Australia) John Alexander / (Australia) Phil Dent defeated (United States) Marty Riessen / (United States) Sherwood Stewart, 7–6, 6–2

== Singles seeds ==
=== Men's singles ===
1. (United States) Pete Sampras (quarterfinals, lost to Richard Krajicek)
2. (Germany) Boris Becker (third round, lost to Neville Godwin)
3. (United States) Andre Agassi (first round, lost to Doug Flach)
4. (Croatia) Goran Ivanišević (quarterfinals, lost to Jason Stoltenberg)
5. (Russia) Yevgeny Kafelnikov (first round, lost to Tim Henman)
6. (United States) Michael Chang (first round, lost to Albert Costa)
7. (Austria) Thomas Muster (withdrew before the tournament began)
8. (United States) Jim Courier (first round, lost to Jonathan Stark)
9. (Sweden) Thomas Enqvist (second round, lost to MaliVai Washington)
10. (Germany) Michael Stich (fourth round, lost to Richard Krajicek)
11. (South Africa) Wayne Ferreira (third round, lost to Magnus Gustafsson)
12. (Sweden) Stefan Edberg (second round, lost to Mikael Tillström)
13. (United States) Todd Martin (semifinals, lost to MaliVai Washington)
14. (Switzerland) Marc Rosset (third round, lost to Pat Rafter)
15. (France) Arnaud Boetsch (first round, lost to Alex Rădulescu)
16. (France) Cédric Pioline (fourth round, lost to Pete Sampras)
17. (Netherlands) Richard Krajicek (champion)

=== Women's singles ===
1. (Germany) Steffi Graf (champion)
2. (United States) Monica Seles (second round, lost to Katarína Studeníková)
3. (Spain) Conchita Martínez (quarterfinals, lost to Kimiko Date)
4. (Spain) Arantxa Sánchez Vicario (final, lost to Steffi Graf)
5. (Germany) Anke Huber (third round, lost to Ai Sugiyama)
6. (Czech Republic) Jana Novotná (quarterfinals, lost to Steffi Graf)
7. (United States) Chanda Rubin (withdrew before the tournament began)
8. (United States) Lindsay Davenport (second round, lost to Larisa Neiland)
9. (United States) Mary Joe Fernández (quarterfinals, lost to Meredith McGrath)
10. (Bulgaria) Magdalena Maleeva (second round, lost to Nathalie Tauziat)
11. (Netherlands) Brenda Schultz-McCarthy (third round, lost to Sabine Appelmans)
12. (Japan) Kimiko Date (semifinals, lost to Steffi Graf)
13. (France) Mary Pierce (quarterfinals, lost to Kimiko Date)
14. (South Africa) Amanda Coetzer (second round, lost to Meredith McGrath)
15. (Romania) Irina Spîrlea (second round, lost to Inés Gorrochategui)
16. (Switzerland) Martina Hingis (fourth round, lost to Steffi Graf)
17. (Slovakia) Karina Habšudová (first round, lost to Judith Wiesner)

Preceded by 1996 French Open	Grand Slams	Succeeded by 1996 US Open
