= 1995 Wimbledon Championships – Boys' doubles =

Boys' doubles
- 1995 Wimbledon Championships

Final
- Champions: (United Kingdom) Martin Lee (United Kingdom) James Trotman
- Runners-up: (Mexico) Alejandro Hernández (Argentina) Mariano Puerta
- Score: 7–6^{(7–2)}, 6–4

Events
Singles	men	women		boys	girls
Doubles	men	women	mixed	boys	girls
WC Singles	men	women	quad
WC Doubles	men	women	quad
Legends	men	women	seniors
← 1994 ·	Wimbledon Championships	· 1996 →

Martin Lee and James Trotman defeated Alejandro Hernández and Mariano Puerta in the final, 7–6^{(7–2)}, 6–4 to win the boys' doubles tennis title at the 1995 Wimbledon Championships.

== Seeds ==
1. (Israel) Eyal Erlich / (Venezuela) Kepler Orellana (first round)
2. (Mexico) Alejandro Hernández / (Argentina) Mariano Puerta (final)
3. (Germany) Tommy Haas / (United States) Gregg Hill (semifinals)
4. (Argentina) Guillermo Cañas / (Argentina) Martín García (quarterfinals)
5. (Brazil) Daniel de Melo / (Brazil) Ricardo Schlachter (second round)
6. (Germany) Nicolas Kiefer / (Germany) Ulrich Jasper Seetzen (quarterfinals)
7. (Germany) Jan-Ralph Brandt / (Netherlands) Peter Wessels (second round)
8. (United States) Justin Gimelstob / (United States) Ryan Wolters (semifinals)

== Draw ==
=== Key ===
- Q = Qualifier
- WC = Wild card
- LL = Lucky loser
- Alt = Alternate
- SE = Special exempt
- PR = Protected ranking
- ITF = ITF entry
- JE = Junior exempt
- w/o = Walkover
- r = Retired
- d = Defaulted
- SR = Special ranking

=== Finals ===
Semifinals
(United Kingdom) Martin Lee (United Kingdom) James Trotman	6	2	6
8	(United States) Justin Gimelstob (United States) Ryan Wolters	4	6	3
3	(Germany) Tommy Haas (United States) Gregg Hill	4	6
2	(Mexico) Alejandro Hernández (Argentina) Mariano Puerta	6	7

Final
(United Kingdom) Martin Lee (United Kingdom) James Trotman	7^{7}	6
2	(Mexico) Alejandro Hernández (Argentina) Mariano Puerta	6^{2}	4

=== Top half ===
First round
1	(Israel) Eyal Erlich (Venezuela) Kepler Orellana	5	7	4
(Slovakia) Boris Borgula (Bosnia and Herzegovina) Merid Zahirović	7	6	6
(Dominican Republic) Alejandro Aybar (Venezuela) Yohny Romero	4	2
(United Kingdom) Martin Lee (United Kingdom) James Trotman	6	6
(Israel) Amir Hadad (Israel) Harel Levy	6	7
(Australia) Luke Bourgeois (New Zealand) Mark Nielsen	4	5
(Argentina) Fabián Cardozo (Argentina) Rodrigo Cerdera	3	1
7	(Germany) Jan-Ralph Brandt (Netherlands) Peter Wessels	6	6
4	(Argentina) Guillermo Cañas (Argentina) Martín García	6	6
(United Kingdom) Steven Clark (United Kingdom) Mark Woolley	4	4
(Canada) Jocelyn Robichaud (New Zealand) Teo Susnjak	6	0	6
(Croatia) Željko Krajan (Romania) Ionuț Moldovan	4	6	3
(United Kingdom) Ben Haran (United Kingdom) Simon Pender	7	6
(India) Vikrant Chadha (Hungary) Miklós Jancsó	5	3
(South Africa) Jeff Coetzee (South Africa) Damien Roberts	4	6	4
8	(United States) Justin Gimelstob (United States) Ryan Wolters	6	4	6

Second round
(Slovakia) B Borgula (Bosnia and Herzegovina) M Zahirović	3	7	2
(United Kingdom) M Lee (United Kingdom) J Trotman	6	6	6
(Israel) A Hadad (Israel) H Levy	6	3	8
7	(Germany) J-R Brandt (Netherlands) P Wessels	4	6	6
4	(Argentina) G Cañas (Argentina) M García	6	3	6
(Canada) J Robichaud (New Zealand) T Susnjak	4	6	1
(United Kingdom) B Haran (United Kingdom) S Pender	1	1
8	(United States) J Gimelstob (United States) R Wolters	6	6

Quarterfinals
(United Kingdom) M Lee (United Kingdom) J Trotman	6	6
(Israel) A Hadad (Israel) H Levy	2	2
4	(Argentina) G Cañas (Argentina) M García	3	2
8	(United States) J Gimelstob (United States) R Wolters	6	6

Semifinals
(United Kingdom) M Lee (United Kingdom) J Trotman	6	2	6
8	(United States) J Gimelstob (United States) R Wolters	4	6	3

=== Bottom half ===
First round
5	(Brazil) Daniel de Melo (Brazil) Ricardo Schlachter	7	2	6
(South Korea) Kim Dong-hyun (South Korea) Lee Jong-min	6	6	4
(Italy) Daniele Bracciali (Italy) Dario Sciortino	3	6	4
(France) Jean-François Bachelot (France) Rodolphe Cadart	6	4	6
(India) Saurav Panja (Thailand) Bhee Witoonpanich	0	4
(United States) Michael Russell (Czech Republic) Michal Tabara	6	6
(United Kingdom) Jamie Delgado (United Kingdom) Alex Osterrieth	6	5	2
3	(Germany) Tommy Haas (United States) Gregg Hill	3	7	6
6	(Germany) Nicolas Kiefer (Germany) Ulrich Jasper Seetzen	6	6
(France) Olivier Mutis (France) Jean-Baptiste Perlant	4	2
(Japan) Yaoki Ishii (Australia) Novak Nash	7	7
(Czech Republic) Radek Štěpánek (Czech Republic) Jiří Vaněk	6	6
(Tunisia) Sami Sidia (Belarus) Vladimir Voltchkov	4	5
(Federal Republic of Yugoslavia) Đorđe Matijašević (Federal Republic of Yugoslavia) Vladimir Pavićević	6	7
(Hungary) Kornél Bardóczky (South Africa) Louis Vosloo	5	2
2	(Mexico) Alejandro Hernández (Argentina) Mariano Puerta	7	6

Second round
(Brazil) D de Melo (Brazil) R Schlachter	1	4
(France) J-F Bachelot (France) R Cadart	6	6
(United States) M Russell (Czech Republic) M Tabara	4	3
3	(Germany) T Haas (United States) G Hill	6	6
6	(Germany) N Kiefer (Germany) UJ Seetzen	7	7
(Japan) Y Ishii (Australia) N Nash	5	5
(Federal Republic of Yugoslavia) Đ Matijašević (Federal Republic of Yugoslavia) V Pavićević	4	4
2	(Mexico) A Hernández (Argentina) M Puerta	6	6

Quarterfinals
(France) J-F Bachelot (France) R Cadart	1	3
3	(Germany) T Haas (United States) G Hill	6	6
6	(Germany) N Kiefer (Germany) UJ Seetzen	7	2	3
2	(Mexico) A Hernández (Argentina) M Puerta	6	6	6

Semifinals
3	(Germany) T Haas (United States) G Hill	4	6
2	(Mexico) A Hernández (Argentina) M Puerta	6	7
