= 1995 Wimbledon Championships – Boys' singles =

Boys' singles
- 1995 Wimbledon Championships

Final
- Champion: (France) Olivier Mutis
- Runner-up: (Germany) Nicolas Kiefer
- Score: 6–2, 6–2

Events
Singles	men	women		boys	girls
Doubles	men	women	mixed	boys	girls
WC Singles	men	women	quad
WC Doubles	men	women	quad
Legends	men	women	seniors
← 1994 ·	Wimbledon Championships	· 1996 →

Olivier Mutis defeated Nicolas Kiefer in the final, 6–2, 6–2 to win the boys' singles tennis title at the 1995 Wimbledon Championships.

== Seeds ==
1. (Germany) Nicolas Kiefer (final)
2. (Israel) Eyal Erlich (third round)
3. (Mexico) Alejandro Hernández (semifinals)
4. (United Kingdom) Jamie Delgado (second round)
5. (Argentina) Mariano Puerta (second round)
6. n/a
7. (South Korea) Lee Jong-min (first round)
8. (Germany) Ulrich Jasper Seetzen (third round)
9. (United Kingdom) Martin Lee (quarterfinals)
10. (Czech Republic) Michal Tabara (second round)
11. (Brazil) Daniel de Melo (first round)
12. (France) Jean-François Bachelot (semifinals)
13. (Sweden) Fredrik Jonsson (first round)
14. (Slovakia) Boris Borgula (third round)
15. (Switzerland) Michel Kratochvil (first round)
16. (Germany) Tommy Haas (second round)

Click on the seed number of a player to go to their draw section.

== Draw ==
=== Key ===
- Q = Qualifier
- WC = Wild card
- LL = Lucky loser
- Alt = Alternate
- SE = Special exempt
- PR = Protected ranking
- ITF = ITF entry
- JE = Junior exempt
- w/o = Walkover
- r = Retired
- d = Defaulted
- SR = Special ranking

=== Finals ===
Quarterfinals
1	(Germany) Nicolas Kiefer	3	6	6
(Argentina) Guillermo Cañas	6	3	4
3	(Mexico) Alejandro Hernández	6	6
9	(United Kingdom) Martin Lee	2	3
12	(France) Jean-François Bachelot	6	6
(Croatia) Željko Krajan	3	2
(France) Olivier Mutis	2	6	6
(Belarus) Vladimir Voltchkov	6	4	2

Semifinals
1	(Germany) Nicolas Kiefer	6	6
3	(Mexico) Alejandro Hernández	1	4
12	(France) Jean-François Bachelot	4	5
(France) Olivier Mutis	6	7

Final
1	(Germany) Nicolas Kiefer	2	2
(France) Olivier Mutis	6	6

=== Top half ===
==== Section 1 ====
First round
1	(Germany) Nicolas Kiefer	6	6
(Thailand) Bhee Witoonpanich	0	2
(Hungary) Kornél Bardóczky	2	3
(Czech Republic) Jiří Vaněk	6	6
(France) Rodolphe Cadart	6	2
(South Korea) Kim Dong-hyun	7	6
(Tunisia) Sami Sidia	2	3
14	(Slovakia) Boris Borgula	6	6
13	(Sweden) Fredrik Jonsson	4	4
(Israel) Amir Hadad	6	6
(Argentina) Fabián Cardozo	5	3
(United Kingdom) Alex Osterrieth	7	6
(Venezuela) Kepler Orellana	6	6
(Switzerland) Philippe Kobzos	4	3
(South Africa) Jeff Coetzee	7	1	0
(Argentina) Guillermo Cañas	6	6	6

Second round
1	(Germany) N Kiefer	7	6
(Czech Republic) J Vaněk	6	4
(South Korea) D-h Kim	5	6
14	(Slovakia) B Borgula	7	7
(Israel) A Hadad	6	6	7
(United Kingdom) A Osterrieth	7	4	5
(Venezuela) K Orellana	1	1
(Argentina) G Cañas	6	6

Third round
1	(Germany) N Kiefer	6	5	6
14	(Slovakia) B Borgula	4	7	3
(Israel) A Hadad	2	1
(Argentina) G Cañas	6	6

Quarterfinals
1	(Germany) N Kiefer	3	6	6
(Argentina) G Cañas	6	3	4

==== Section 2 ====
First round
3	(Mexico) Alejandro Hernández	6	6
(United Kingdom) Steven Clark	0	2
(United States) Ryan Wolters	7	6
(Hungary) Miklós Jancsó	6	4
(Israel) Harel Levy	2	7	3
(Brazil) Ricardo Schlachter	6	6	6
(India) Saurav Panja	1	4
16	(Germany) Tommy Haas	6	6
9	(United Kingdom) Martin Lee	6	6
(Romania) Ionuț Moldovan	1	2
(France) Jean-Baptiste Perlant	6	6
(Federal Republic of Yugoslavia) Vladimir Pavićević	4	4
(Italy) Daniele Bracciali	4	4
(Netherlands) Peter Wessels	6	6
(New Zealand) Teo Susnjak	6	3	1
5	(Argentina) Mariano Puerta	4	6	6

Second round
3	(Mexico) A Hernández	6	6
(United States) R Wolters	3	4
(Brazil) R Schlachter	2	6	5
16	(Germany) T Haas	6	2	2^{r}
9	(United Kingdom) M Lee	6	6
(France) J-B Perlant	3	2
(Netherlands) P Wessels	6	6
5	(Argentina) M Puerta	4	4

Third round
3	(Mexico) A Hernández	3	6	6
(Brazil) R Schlachter	6	3	3
9	(United Kingdom) M Lee	6	7
(Netherlands) P Wessels	3	6

Quarterfinals
3	(Mexico) A Hernández	6	6
9	(United Kingdom) M Lee	2	3

=== Bottom half ===
==== Section 3 ====
First round
7	(South Korea) Lee Jong-min	2	4
(Sweden) Björn Rehnquist	6	6
(Japan) Yaoki Ishii	4	1
(Germany) Jan-Ralph Brandt	6	6
(Hong Kong) John Hui	6	7
(United Kingdom) Ben Haran	1	6
(Egypt) Hisham Hemeda	7	1	1
12	(France) Jean-François Bachelot	5	6	6
15	(Switzerland) Michel Kratochvil	6	6	4
(Czech Republic) Radek Štěpánek	3	7	6
(Dominican Republic) Alejandro Aybar	4	2
(Brazil) Rodrigo Ribeiro	6	6
(Croatia) Željko Krajan	6	7
(Argentina) Rodrigo Cerdera	4	6
(Federal Republic of Yugoslavia) Đorđe Matijašević	2	2
4	(United Kingdom) Jamie Delgado	6	6

Second round
(Sweden) B Rehnquist	6	6
(Germany) J-R Brandt	3	0
(Hong Kong) J Hui	4	3
12	(France) J-F Bachelot	6	6
(Czech Republic) R Štěpánek	6	6
(Brazil) R Ribeiro	2	4
(Croatia) Ž Krajan	6	6
4	(United Kingdom) J Delgado	4	2

Third round
(Sweden) B Rehnquist	1	3
12	(France) J-F Bachelot	6	6
(Czech Republic) R Štěpánek	6	6	4
(Croatia) Ž Krajan	4	7	6

Quarterfinals
12	(France) J-F Bachelot	6	6
(Croatia) Ž Krajan	3	2

==== Section 4 ====
First round
8	(Germany) Ulrich Jasper Seetzen	6	6
(Italy) Dario Sciortino	0	2
(United States) Michael Russell	6	1	6
(Venezuela) Yohny Romero	2	6	3
(France) Olivier Mutis	6	3	7
(Sweden) Nicklas Timfjord	3	6	5
(Canada) Jocelyn Robichaud	1	7	1
10	(Czech Republic) Michal Tabara	6	6	6
11	(Brazil) Daniel de Melo	0	3
(United States) Justin Gimelstob	6	6
(Belarus) Vladimir Voltchkov	6	6	6
(United Kingdom) James Trotman	2	7	0
(Bosnia and Herzegovina) Merid Zahirović	6	7
(India) Vikrant Chadha	3	6
(Australia) Novak Nash	4	2
2	(Israel) Eyal Erlich	6	6

Second round
8	(Germany) UJ Seetzen	6	6
(United States) M Russell	3	3
(France) O Mutis	7	6
10	(Czech Republic) M Tabara	6	0
(United States) J Gimelstob	5	4
(Belarus) V Voltchkov	7	6
(Bosnia and Herzegovina) M Zahirović	4	6	1
2	(Israel) E Erlich	6	3	6

Third round
8	(Germany) UJ Seetzen	3	7	1
(France) O Mutis	6	5	6
(Belarus) V Voltchkov	3	6	9
2	(Israel) E Erlich	6	3	7

Quarterfinals
(France) O Mutis	2	6	6
(Belarus) V Voltchkov	6	4	2
