= Gary Henderson =

Gary Henderson may refer to:

- Gary Henderson (baseball coach), American college baseball coach
- Gary Henderson (playwright) (born 1955), New Zealand playwright, director and teacher
- Gary Henderson (tennis) (born 1969), British former professional tennis player
