= Gary Henderson (tennis) =

British tennis player

- Full name: Gary Henderson
- Country (sports): Great Britain
- Born: 13 December 1969 (age 55); Northampton, England
- Prize money: $26,241

Singles
- Career record: 0–1
- Career titles: 0
- Highest ranking: No. 237 (28 November 1994)

Grand Slam singles results
- Wimbledon: 1R (1995)

Doubles
- Career record: 0–1
- Career titles: 0
- Highest ranking: No. 323 (20 November 1995)

Grand Slam doubles results
- Wimbledon: 1R (1995)

Gary Henderson (born 13 December 1969) is a British former professional tennis player.

== Biography ==
Born in Northampton, Henderson moved to California as a teenager in 1983 and was a hitting partner for Michael Chang. He went to Mississippi State University and played tennis on the collegiate team, before turning professional in 1992 and returning to England.

Starting on the satellite circuit, he had wins over Kelly Evernden, Nicolas Escude and Davide Sanguinetti early in his career. Henderson, who peaked at 237 in the world, was a member of Great Britain's 1995 Davis Cup squad. After falling in the final round of qualifying at both Queen's and Nottingham in 1995, he was given a wildcard into the 1995 Wimbledon Championships. He was beaten in the first round by 16th seed Guy Forget. In the men's doubles he qualified for the main draw with partner Jamie Delgado but the pair were unable to get past the South African pairing of Lan Bale and John-Laffnie de Jager in the opening round. He also took part in the men's singles qualifiers at the Australian Open, French Open and US Open in 1995, which was his final year on the professional tour.

Henderson returned to the United States in 2012 and is currently the Director of Tennis at BallenIsles Country Club, Palm Beach Gardens, Florida.
