= 1995 French Open – Men's singles =

Men's singles
- 1995 French Open

Final
- Champion: (Austria) Thomas Muster
- Runner-up: (United States) Michael Chang
- Score: 7–5, 6–2, 6–4

Details
- Draw: 128
- Seeds: 16

Events
Singles	men	women		boys	girls
Doubles	men	women	mixed	boys	girls
WC Singles	men	women	quad
WC Doubles	men	women	quad
Legends	−45	45+	women
← 1994 ·	French Open	· 1996 →

Thomas Muster defeated Michael Chang in the final, 7–5, 6–2, 6–4 to win the men's singles tennis title at the 1995 French Open. It was his first and only major singles title, becoming the first Austrian to win a major singles title.

Sergi Bruguera was the two-time defending champion, but lost to Chang in the semifinals.

During the tournament, Mats Wilander and Karel Novacek tested positive for cocaine, which eventually resulted in a three-month suspension from the ATP Tour issued in May 1997. In addition, both players had to return prize money and forfeit ranking points.

== Seeds ==
1. (United States) Andre Agassi (quarterfinals)
2. (United States) Pete Sampras (first round)
3. (Germany) Boris Becker (third round)
4. (Croatia) Goran Ivanišević (first round)
5. (Austria) Thomas Muster (champion)
6. (United States) Michael Chang (final)
7. (Spain) Sergi Bruguera (semifinals)
8. (South Africa) Wayne Ferreira (third round)
9. (Russia) Yevgeny Kafelnikov (semifinals)
10. (Sweden) Magnus Larsson (fourth round)
11. (Spain) Alberto Berasategui (third round)
12. (Germany) Michael Stich (fourth round)
13. (United States) Jim Courier (fourth round)
14. (United States) Todd Martin (third round)
15. (Netherlands) Richard Krajicek (second round)
16. (Switzerland) Marc Rosset (second round)

== Draw ==
=== Key ===
- Q = Qualifier
- WC = Wild card
- LL = Lucky loser
- Alt = Alternate
- ITF = ITF entry
- PR = Protected ranking
- SR = Special ranking
- SE = Special exempt
- JE = Junior exempt
- JR = Junior Accelerator Programme entrant
- CO = College Accelerator Programme entrant
- NG = Next Gen Accelerator Program entrant
- w/o = Walkover
- r = Retired
- d = Defaulted

=== Finals ===
Quarterfinals
1	(United States) Andre Agassi	4	3	5
9	(Russia) Yevgeny Kafelnikov	6	6	7
(Spain) Albert Costa	2	6	7^{8}	5	2
5	(Austria) Thomas Muster	6	3	6^{6}	7	6
6	(United States) Michael Chang	7	6	6
Q	(Romania) Adrian Voinea	5	0	1
7	(Spain) Sergi Bruguera	6	7	6
(Italy) Renzo Furlan	2	5	2

Semifinals
9	(Russia) Yevgeny Kafelnikov	4	0	4
5	(Austria) Thomas Muster	6	6	6
6	(United States) Michael Chang	6	7^{7}	7^{7}
7	(Spain) Sergi Bruguera	4	6^{5}	6^{0}

Final
5	(Austria) Thomas Muster	7	6	6
6	(United States) Michael Chang	5	2	4

=== Top half ===
==== Section 1 ====
First round
1	(United States) A Agassi	6	6	6
(Germany) K Braasch	1	4	4
(Uruguay) M Filippini	3	6	4	6	4
(Australia) T Woodbridge	6	4	6	1	6
(Spain) F Clavet	6	6	4	6
(Italy) G Pozzi	2	3	6	3
(United States) T Ho	6	1	6	2	5
WC	(France) T Champion	4	6	3	6	7
(United States) P McEnroe	6	6	7
Q	(Sweden) T Johansson	3	2	5
LL	(Spain) Á López Morón	5	3	3
Q	(Morocco) Y El Aynaoui	7	6	6
Q	(Australia) A Ilie	3	2	7^{8}	6	6
(Italy) C Caratti	6	6	6^{6}	2	4
(Germany) M Sinner	4	3	3
15	(Netherlands) R Krajicek	6	6	6

Second round
1	(United States) A Agassi	7	6	6
(Australia) T Woodbridge	5	1	0
(Spain) F Clavet	6	1
WC	(France) T Champion	2	0	r
(United States) P McEnroe	2	1	3
Q	(Morocco) Y El Aynaoui	6	6	6
Q	(Australia) A Ilie	3	6	6	2	6
15	(Netherlands) R Krajicek	6	3	4	6	4

Third round
1	(United States) A Agassi	6	6	6
(Spain) F Clavet	1	2	0
Q	(Morocco) Y El Aynaoui	6	7	6
Q	(Australia) A Ilie	2	5	2

Fourth round
1	(United States) A Agassi	6	6	6
Q	(Morocco) Y El Aynaoui	4	2	2

==== Section 2 ====
First round
9	(Russia) Y Kafelnikov	6	6	6^{3}	6
(Netherlands) J Siemerink	1	2	7^{7}	3
(Germany) D Prinosil	7	1	2	1
(Sweden) M Gustafsson	5	6	6	6
(Netherlands) P Haarhuis	3	6	4	4
(United States) D Wheaton	6	4	6	6
(Spain) E Sánchez	6	6	6
(Australia) J Morgan	1	4	2
Q	(Poland) W Kowalski	4	7	7^{10}	2	4
(France) G Forget	6	5	6^{8}	6	6
WC	(France) J Golmard	4	5	0
(Spain) À Corretja	6	7	6
(United States) D Rostagno	5	5	4
(Sweden) M Wilander	7	7	6
(France) L Roux	4	4	5
8	(South Africa) W Ferreira	6	6	7

Second round
9	(Russia) Y Kafelnikov	6	6^{2}	6	7
(Sweden) M Gustafsson	3	7^{7}	1	5
(United States) D Wheaton	5	6	7^{7}	7^{7}
(Spain) E Sánchez	7	4	6^{5}	6^{3}
(France) G Forget	2	3	3
(Spain) À Corretja	6	6	6
(Sweden) M Wilander	7^{7}	6^{1}	3	7^{7}	6
8	(South Africa) W Ferreira	6^{5}	7^{7}	6	6^{4}	8

Third round
9	(Russia) Y Kafelnikov	6	6	4	6
(United States) D Wheaton	2	1	6	3
(Spain) À Corretja	6	7	6
8	(South Africa) W Ferreira	4	5	2

Fourth round
9	(Russia) Y Kafelnikov	6	6	6
(Spain) À Corretja	3	2	2

==== Section 3 ====
First round
4	(Croatia) G Ivanišević	5	3	4
Q	(Sweden) M Tillström	7	6	6
(Germany) B Karbacher	6	6	6^{4}	6
Q	(France) D Courcol	2	4	7^{7}	3
(France) G Raoux	6	6	0	7
(United Kingdom) J Bates	3	0	6	5
(Spain) A Costa	6	6	6
(Germany) J Renzenbrink	3	4	0
(Czech Republic) R Vašek	4	3	1
Q	(United States) D Johnson	6	6	6
WC	(France) L Barthez	6	3	3	6^{3}
(Norway) C Ruud	4	6	6	7^{7}
(Denmark) K Carlsen	6	3	6	6
(Germany) M Zoecke	2	6	3	2
(United States) J Tarango	4	3	3
13	(United States) J Courier	6	6	6

Second round
Q	(Sweden) M Tillström	6^{4}	3	7^{7}	6	7
(Germany) B Karbacher	7^{7}	6	6^{5}	2	9
(France) G Raoux	4	4	4
(Spain) A Costa	6	6	6
Q	(United States) D Johnson	1	4	3
(Norway) C Ruud	6	6	6
(Denmark) K Carlsen	3	4	0
13	(United States) J Courier	6	6	6

Third round
(Germany) B Karbacher	5	2	2
(Spain) A Costa	7	6	6
(Norway) C Ruud	4	3	4
13	(United States) J Courier	6	6	6

Fourth round
(Spain) A Costa	6	1	7^{7}	6
13	(United States) J Courier	4	6	6^{4}	4

==== Section 4 ====
First round
11	(Spain) A Berasategui	2	6	6	7
(Russia) A Olhovskiy	6	4	2	5
(Chile) M Ríos	6	6	6^{8}	6
(United States) V Spadea	4	4	7^{10}	3
(France) F Vitoux	2	1	1
WC	(Ukraine) A Medvedev	6	6	6
(United States) M Washington	6	3	7^{7}	6
(Australia) J Stoltenberg	4	6	6^{2}	1
(Czech Republic) B Ulihrach	6	6	6
(Russia) A Volkov	0	3	1
(Peru) J Yzaga	6	1	2	2
(Spain) C Costa	4	6	6	6
(Czech Republic) K Nováček	1	6	3	4
(France) C Pioline	6	3	6	6
Q	(France) G Solvès	6	4	2	1
5	(Austria) T Muster	3	6	6	6

Second round
11	(Spain) A Berasategui	6	7	6^{3}	3	6
(Chile) M Ríos	4	5	7^{7}	6	1
WC	(Ukraine) A Medvedev	5	6	6	6^{3}	6
(United States) M Washington	7	3	4	7^{7}	3
(Czech Republic) B Ulihrach	4	6	6	5	2
(Spain) C Costa	6	4	2	7	6
(France) C Pioline	1	3	3
5	(Austria) T Muster	6	6	6

Third round
11	(Spain) A Berasategui	6	3	6	5	3
WC	(Ukraine) A Medvedev	3	6	4	7	6
(Spain) C Costa	3	5	2
5	(Austria) T Muster	6	7	6

Fourth round
WC	(Ukraine) A Medvedev	3	3	0
5	(Austria) T Muster	6	6	6

=== Bottom half ===
==== Section 5 ====
First round
6	(United States) M Chang	6	6	6
Q	(Italy) D Nargiso	3	4	1
(Czech Republic) D Vacek	6	6	6
(Spain) O Martinez	1	3	0
(United States) B Shelton	6	6	3	2	4
(Denmark) F Fetterlein	3	4	6	6	6
(Spain) T Carbonell	6	5	6	7^{7}
WC	(France) R Gilbert	2	7	2	6^{3}
(Canada) S Lareau	4	4	3
(Spain) J Sánchez	6	6	6
(France) A Boetsch	6	6	6
(Sweden) T Enqvist	4	3	2
(France) F Santoro	2	0	2
(Sweden) S Edberg	6	6	6
(Czech Republic) M Damm	6^{6}	7	6^{4}	4
12	(Germany) M Stich	7^{8}	5	7^{7}	6

Second round
6	(United States) M Chang	6	5	6	6
(Czech Republic) D Vacek	3	7	4	4
(Denmark) F Fetterlein	6	3	6	4	4
(Spain) T Carbonell	2	6	3	6	6
(Spain) J Sánchez	6^{5}	2	2
(France) A Boetsch	7^{7}	6	6
(Sweden) S Edberg	6^{3}	3	2
12	(Germany) M Stich	7^{7}	6	6

Third round
6	(United States) M Chang	6	6	7
(Spain) T Carbonell	1	2	5
(France) A Boetsch	2	4	7	6	3
12	(Germany) M Stich	6	6	5	3	6

Fourth round
6	(United States) M Chang	1	6	6	6
12	(Germany) M Stich	6	0	2	3

==== Section 6 ====
First round
14	(United States) T Martin	6	6	7^{7}
(Australia) M Tebbutt	2	1	6^{4}
(Czech Republic) S Doseděl	6^{6}	7	5	7^{7}	8
WC	(France) O Mutis	7^{8}	5	7	6^{4}	6
(Russia) A Chesnokov	6	6	6
(United States) A Krickstein	1	4	4
(Kenya) P Wekesa	2	0^{r}
WC	(France) T Guardiola	6	1
(Slovakia) K Kučera	2	2	3
Q	(Romania) A Voinea	6	6	6
(France) O Delaître	1	4	6^{4}
Q	(Belgium) J Van Herck	6	6	7^{7}
(Switzerland) J Hlasek	6	6	6^{8}	4	6
(United States) J Palmer	4	3	7^{10}	6	8
(Argentina) J Frana	6^{6}	4	3
3	(Germany) B Becker	7^{8}	6	6

Second round
14	(United States) T Martin	6	2	6	7^{7}
(Czech Republic) S Doseděl	2	6	3	6^{5}
(Russia) A Chesnokov	7	6	6
WC	(France) T Guardiola	5	2	3
Q	(Romania) A Voinea	7^{7}	6	6
Q	(Belgium) J Van Herck	6^{4}	3	0
(United States) J Palmer	2	2	2
3	(Germany) B Becker	6	6	6

Third round
14	(United States) T Martin	2	2	4
(Russia) A Chesnokov	6	6	6
Q	(Romania) A Voinea	6	6	3	7
3	(Germany) B Becker	3	4	6	5

Fourth round
(Russia) A Chesnokov	6^{3}	3	4
Q	(Romania) A Voinea	7^{7}	6	6

==== Section 7 ====
First round
7	(Spain) S Bruguera	6	6	7^{7}
(Australia) P Rafter	3	1	6^{3}
Q	(Spain) E Benfele Álvarez	7^{7}	6	7^{7}
WC	(France) J-P Fleurian	6^{4}	2	6^{4}
Q	(Germany) C Arriens	7^{8}	2	0^{d}
(New Zealand) B Steven	6^{6}	6	0
(Germany) M-K Goellner	6	6^{4}	7^{7}	6
(Italy) A Gaudenzi	3	7^{7}	6^{3}	4
(Netherlands) J Eltingh	6	6	6
(Germany) C-U Steeb	4	2	0
(Sweden) J Apell	3	6	6^{5}	6	8
(Zimbabwe) B Black	6	3	7^{7}	4	10
(Germany) H Dreekmann	6	6	5	3	6
LL	(Belgium) K Goossens	4	2	7	6	4
(Spain) J Arrese	1	6	2	4
10	(Sweden) M Larsson	6	1	6	6

Second round
7	(Spain) S Bruguera	6	6	6
Q	(Spain) E Benfele Álvarez	4	4	2
(New Zealand) B Steven	7^{7}	6	5	4	7
(Germany) M-K Goellner	6^{5}	2	7	6	5
(Netherlands) J Eltingh	6	6	6
(Zimbabwe) B Black	2	4	4
(Germany) H Dreekmann	4	3	7^{8}	2
10	(Sweden) M Larsson	6	6	6^{6}	6

Third round
7	(Spain) S Bruguera	6	6	6
(New Zealand) B Steven	3	2	4
(Netherlands) J Eltingh	4	7	6^{2}	3
10	(Sweden) M Larsson	6	5	7^{7}	6

Fourth round
7	(Spain) S Bruguera	6	2	7	7^{7}
10	(Sweden) M Larsson	1	6	5	6^{4}

==== Section 8 ====
First round
16	(Switzerland) M Rosset	7	5	7	7^{7}
(Australia) R Fromberg	5	7	5	6^{5}
(Brazil) F Meligeni	6	6	6
(Czech Republic) P Korda	4	4	4
(South Africa) M Ondruska	4	6	2	3
(Italy) R Furlan	6	4	6	6
(United States) J Stark	4	6^{3}	2
Q	(Czech Republic) D Rikl	6	7^{7}	6
(Australia) M Woodforde	6	6	6
Q	(Argentina) H Gumy	4	0	3
(United States) R Reneberg	6	5	6	6
(United States) J Grabb	4	7	2	3
(Sweden) J Björkman	7^{8}	3	3	6	2
Q	(Australia) S Draper	6^{6}	6	6	3	6
(Austria) G Schaller	7^{7}	4	6^{4}	6	6
2	(United States) P Sampras	6^{3}	6	7^{7}	2	4

Second round
16	(Switzerland) M Rosset	6^{7}	6^{4}	6	3
(Brazil) F Meligeni	7^{9}	7^{7}	2	6
(Italy) R Furlan	6	6	6^{4}	4	7
Q	(Czech Republic) D Rikl	4	4	7^{7}	6	5
(Australia) M Woodforde	0	5	6^{5}
(United States) R Reneberg	6	7	7^{7}
Q	(Australia) S Draper	4	4	7^{7}	7	8
(Austria) G Schaller	6	6	6^{5}	5	6

Third round
(Brazil) F Meligeni	3	6^{4}	5
(Italy) R Furlan	6	7^{7}	7
(United States) R Reneberg	2	2	6	4
Q	(Australia) S Draper	6	6	3	6

Fourth round
(Italy) R Furlan	7	6	7^{8}
Q	(Australia) S Draper	5	1	6^{6}

Preceded by 1995 Australian Open – Men's singles	Grand Slam men's singles	Succeeded by 1995 Wimbledon Championships – Men's singles
