= 1995 Wimbledon Championships – Girls' singles =

Girls' singles
- 1995 Wimbledon Championships

Final
- Champion: (Poland) Aleksandra Olsza
- Runner-up: (Thailand) Tamarine Tanasugarn
- Score: 7–5, 7–6^{(8–6)}

Events
Singles	men	women		boys	girls
Doubles	men	women	mixed	boys	girls
WC Singles	men	women	quad
WC Doubles	men	women	quad
Legends	men	women	seniors
← 1994 ·	Wimbledon Championships	· 1996 →

Aleksandra Olsza defeated Tamarine Tanasugarn in the final, 7–5, 7–6^{(8–6)} to win the girls' singles tennis title at the 1995 Wimbledon Championships.

== Seeds ==
1. (Netherlands) Yvette Basting (second round)
2. (Russia) Anna Kournikova (semifinals)
3. (Australia) Annabel Ellwood (third round)
4. (San Marino) Ludmila Varmužová (third round)
5. (Thailand) Tamarine Tanasugarn (final)
6. (Australia) Siobhan Drake-Brockman (second round)
7. (France) Amélie Cocheteux (second round)
8. n/a
9. (Poland) Aleksandra Olsza (champion)
10. (Czech Republic) Jitka Schönfeldová (second round)
11. (Czech Republic) Denisa Chládková (first round)
12. (Hungary) Kira Nagy (second round)
13. (United States) Lilia Osterloh (third round)
14. (Austria) Barbara Schwartz (quarterfinals)
15. (Brazil) Miriam D'Agostini (first round)
16. n/a

Click on the seed number of a player to go to their draw section.

== Draw ==
=== Key ===
- Q = Qualifier
- WC = Wild card
- LL = Lucky loser
- Alt = Alternate
- SE = Special exempt
- PR = Protected ranking
- ITF = ITF entry
- JE = Junior exempt
- w/o = Walkover
- r = Retired
- d = Defaulted
- SR = Special ranking

=== Finals ===
Quarterfinals
(Japan) Haruka Inoue	4	7	6
(France) Amélie Castéra	6	5	4
9	(Poland) Aleksandra Olsza	6	6
(France) Nathalie Dechy	2	3
5	(Thailand) Tamarine Tanasugarn	6	6
14	(Austria) Barbara Schwartz	4	3
(South Korea) Jeon Mi-ra	3	6	4
2	(Russia) Anna Kournikova	6	1	6

Semifinals
(Japan) Haruka Inoue	2	5
9	(Poland) Aleksandra Olsza	6	7
5	(Thailand) Tamarine Tanasugarn	7	6
2	(Russia) Anna Kournikova	6	3

Final
9	(Poland) Aleksandra Olsza	7	7^{8}
5	(Thailand) Tamarine Tanasugarn	5	6^{6}

=== Top half ===
==== Section 1 ====
First round
1	(Netherlands) Yvette Basting	7	6
(Belarus) Olga Barabanschikova	5	4
(Japan) Haruka Inoue	6	6
(Romania) Raluca Sandu	4	1
(United Kingdom) Fiona Lishman	6	6
(Mexico) Mercedes del Valle Prieto	2	2
(Malaysia) Chiew Eline	1	2
13	(United States) Lilia Osterloh	6	6
11	(Czech Republic) Denisa Chládková	6	2
(South Africa) Surina de Beer	7	6
(Germany) Marlene Weingärtner	6	1	6
(Zimbabwe) Cara Black	3	6	3
(Switzerland) Miroslava Vavrinec	2	5
(France) Amélie Castéra	6	7
(Peru) Déborah Gaviria	1	2
6	(Australia) Siobhan Drake-Brockman	6	6

Second round
1	(Netherlands) Y Basting	4	4
(Japan) H Inoue	6	6
(United Kingdom) F Lishman	2	3
13	(United States) L Osterloh	6	6
(South Africa) S de Beer	3	3
(Germany) M Weingärtner	6	6
(France) A Castéra	6	6
(Australia) S Drake-Brockman	3	3

Third round
(Japan) H Inoue	3	6	7
(United States) L Osterloh	6	3	5
(Germany) M Weingärtner	6	1
(France) A Castéra	7	6

Quarterfinals
(Japan) H Inoue	4	7	6
(France) A Castéra	6	5	4

==== Section 2 ====
First round
4	(San Marino) Ludmila Varmužová	6	6
(United States) Amanda Basica	2	4
(Hungary) Petra Mandula	6	6
(Mexico) Karen Goldstein	3	0
(Czech Republic) Michaela Paštiková	6	6
(United Kingdom) Katia Roubanova	4	3
(Federal Republic of Yugoslavia) Sandra Načuk	4	1
9	(Poland) Aleksandra Olsza	6	6
15	(Brazil) Miriam D'Agostini	1	2
(Germany) Tina Plivelitsch	6	6
(France) Nathalie Dechy	6	6
(Tunisia) Selima Sfar	4	3
(India) Aarthi Venkatesan	3	6
(United States) Samantha Reeves	6	7
(Chinese Taipei) Weng Tzu-ting	6	6	6
(South Africa) Giselle Swart	7	1	1

Second round
4	(San Marino) L Varmužová	6	6
(Hungary) P Mandula	4	4
(Czech Republic) M Paštiková	2	1
9	(Poland) A Olsza	6	6
(Germany) T Plivelitsch	5	6	2
(France) N Dechy	7	4	6
(United States) S Reeves	2	6
(Chinese Taipei) T-t Weng	6	7

Third round
4	(San Marino) L Varmužová	6	5	0^{r}
9	(Poland) A Olsza	4	7	3
(France) N Dechy	6	6
(Chinese Taipei) T-t Weng	2	3

Quarterfinals
9	(Poland) A Olsza	6	6
(France) N Dechy	2	3

=== Bottom half ===
==== Section 3 ====
First round
5	(Thailand) Tamarine Tanasugarn	6	6
(Indonesia) Wynne Prakusya	3	2
(United States) Corina Morariu	6	6
(United Kingdom) Zoe Mellis	2	1
(Slovakia) Ľudmila Cervanová	3	6	6
(France) Amélie Mauresmo	6	1	2
(Peru) María Eugenia Rojas	3	4
12	(Hungary) Kira Nagy	6	6
14	(Austria) Barbara Schwartz	4	6	6
(Japan) Saori Obata	6	1	0
(Czech Republic) Anna Monhartová	6	6
(Malaysia) Khoo Chin-bee	2	1
(United Kingdom) Abigail Tordoff	2	4
(Germany) Sandra Klösel	6	6
(Italy) Alice Canepa	4	2
3	(Australia) Annabel Ellwood	6	6

Second round
5	(Thailand) T Tanasugarn	7	1
(United States) C Morariu	6	1^{r}
(Slovakia) Ľ Cervanová	6	6
12	(Hungary) K Nagy	1	3
14	(Austria) B Schwartz	6	6
(Czech Republic) A Monhartová	1	1
(Germany) S Klösel	2	1
3	(Australia) A Ellwood	6	6

Third round
5	(Thailand) T Tanasugarn	6	6
(Slovakia) Ľ Cervanová	4	4
14	(Austria) B Schwartz	7	3	6
3	(Australia) A Ellwood	6	6	4

Quarterfinals
5	(Thailand) T Tanasugarn	6	6
14	(Austria) B Schwartz	4	3

==== Section 4 ====
First round
7	(France) Amélie Cocheteux	2	7	6
(Belarus) Tatiana Poutchek	6	6	1
(United States) Stephanie Halsell	6	6
(Mexico) Karin Palme	1	3
(Switzerland) Patty Schnyder	1	0
(United Kingdom) Megan Miller	6	6
(South Africa) Jessica Steck	3	3
(South Korea) Jeon Mi-ra	6	6
10	(Czech Republic) Jitka Schönfeldová	2	6	6
(Hong Kong) Lee Chan	6	1	3
(Hungary) Katalin Marosi	1	2
(Australia) Trudi Musgrave	6	6
(Romania) Alice Pirsu	3	6	6
(Croatia) Ana Radeljević	6	1	4
(Spain) Paula Hermida	6	5
2	(Russia) Anna Kournikova	7	6

Second round
7	(France) A Cocheteux	6	5	2
(United States) S Halsell	1	7	6
(United Kingdom) M Miller	2	4
(South Korea) M-r Jeon	6	6
10	(Czech Republic) J Schönfeldová	7	2	5
(Australia) T Musgrave	5	6	7
(Romania) A Pirsu	4	4
2	(Russia) A Kournikova	6	6

Third round
(United States) S Halsell	6	2
(South Korea) M-r Jeon	7	6
(Australia) T Musgrave	6	2
2	(Russia) A Kournikova	7	6

Quarterfinals
(South Korea) M-r Jeon	3	6	4
2	(Russia) A Kournikova	6	1	6
