= 1995 Wimbledon Championships – Men's doubles =

Men's doubles
- 1995 Wimbledon Championships

Final
- Champions: (Australia) Todd Woodbridge (Australia) Mark Woodforde
- Runners-up: (United States) Rick Leach (United States) Scott Melville
- Score: 7–5, 7–6^{(10–8)}, 7–6^{(7–5)}

Details
- Draw: 64 (3 Q / 6 WC )
- Seeds: 16

Events
Singles	men	women		boys	girls
Doubles	men	women	mixed	boys	girls
WC Singles	men	women	quad
WC Doubles	men	women	quad
Legends	men	women	seniors
← 1994 ·	Wimbledon Championships	· 1996 →

Two-time defending champions Todd Woodbridge and Mark Woodforde defeated Rick Leach and Scott Melville in the final, 7–5, 7–6^{(10–8)}, 7–6^{(7–5)} to win the gentlemen's doubles title at the 1995 Wimbledon Championships. It was their third Wimbledon title and fourth major title overall.

== Seeds ==
1. (Netherlands) Jacco Eltingh / (Netherlands) Paul Haarhuis (quarterfinals)
2. (Australia) Todd Woodbridge / (Australia) Mark Woodforde (champions)
3. (Canada) Grant Connell / (United States) Patrick Galbraith (first round)
4. (Zimbabwe) Byron Black / (United States) Jonathan Stark (third round)
5. (United States) Jim Grabb / (United States) Patrick McEnroe (first round)
6. (United States) Jared Palmer / (United States) Richey Reneberg (third round)
7. (Sweden) Jan Apell / (Sweden) Jonas Björkman (third round)
8. (Czech Republic) Cyril Suk / (Czech Republic) Daniel Vacek (first round)
9. (United States) Tommy Ho / (New Zealand) Brett Steven (second round)
10. (United States) Trevor Kronemann / (Australia) David Macpherson (second round)
11. (The Bahamas) Mark Knowles / (Canada) Daniel Nestor (semifinals)
12. (Russia) Andrei Olhovskiy / (Netherlands) Jan Siemerink (quarterfinals)
13. (United States) Alex O'Brien / (Australia) Sandon Stolle (third round)
14. (Germany) Marc-Kevin Goellner / (Russia) Yevgeny Kafelnikov (semifinals)
15. (South Africa) Lan Bale / (South Africa) John-Laffnie de Jager (third round)
16. (South Africa) Piet Norval / (Netherlands) Menno Oosting (third round)

Click on the seed number of a player to go to their draw section.

== Draw ==
=== Key ===
- Q = Qualifier
- WC = Wild card
- LL = Lucky loser
- Alt = Alternate
- ITF = ITF entry
- PR = Protected ranking
- SR = Special ranking
- SE = Special exempt
- JE = Junior exempt
- JR = Junior Accelerator Programme entrant
- CO = College Accelerator Programme entrant
- NG = Next Gen Accelerator Program entrant
- w/o = Walkover
- r = Retired
- d = Defaulted

=== Finals ===
Quarterfinals
1	(Netherlands) Jacco Eltingh (Netherlands) Paul Haarhuis	4	4	6	6^{5}
(United States) Rick Leach (United States) Scott Melville	6	6	3	7^{7}
14	(Germany) Marc-Kevin Goellner (Russia) Yevgeny Kafelnikov	7^{7}	6^{3}	6	6
12	(Russia) Andrei Olhovskiy (Netherlands) Jan Siemerink	6^{5}	7^{7}	3	4
11	(The Bahamas) Mark Knowles (Canada) Daniel Nestor	6	6	6
(France) Guy Forget (Switzerland) Jakob Hlasek	4	4	4
(Australia) Mark Philippoussis (Australia) Patrick Rafter	2	6	2	6^{7}
2	(Australia) Todd Woodbridge (Australia) Mark Woodforde	6	1	6	7^{9}

Semifinals
(United States) Rick Leach (United States) Scott Melville	3	7^{14}	6^{2}	7^{7}	6
14	(Germany) Marc-Kevin Goellner (Russia) Yevgeny Kafelnikov	6	6^{12}	7^{7}	6^{3}	3
11	(The Bahamas) Mark Knowles (Canada) Daniel Nestor	3	3	3
2	(Australia) Todd Woodbridge (Australia) Mark Woodforde	6	6	6

Final
(United States) Rick Leach (United States) Scott Melville	5	6^{8}	6^{5}
2	(Australia) Todd Woodbridge (Australia) Mark Woodforde	7	7^{10}	7^{7}

=== Top half ===
==== Section 1 ====
First round
1	(Netherlands) J Eltingh (Netherlands) P Haarhuis	6	6	6
WC	(United Kingdom) M Petchey (United Kingdom) C Wilkinson	3	4	4
(Germany) M Sinner (Netherlands) J Winnink	5	6^{8}	4
(United States) M Bauer (Australia) J Ireland	7	7^{10}	6
(Spain) JA Conde (Portugal) N Marques	7^{7}	7^{7}	7
(Sweden) P Nyborg (South Africa) K Ullyett	6^{2}	6^{5}	5
Q	(United Kingdom) J Delgado (United Kingdom) G Henderson	4	4	6^{7}
15	(South Africa) L Bale (South Africa) J-L de Jager	6	6	7^{9}
9	(United States) T Ho (New Zealand) B Steven	6^{4}	7	6	6
(Belgium) D Norman (Belgium) L Pimek	7^{7}	5	2	2
(Italy) C Brandi (South Africa) M Ondruska	5	5	7^{7}	7^{7}	6
(Germany) A Mronz (Germany) U Riglewski	7	7	6^{4}	6^{1}	2
(Australia) J Eagle (Australia) A Florent	7^{7}	4	4	6	7
(Argentina) P Albano (Netherlands) HJ Davids	6^{2}	6	6	4	5
(United States) R Leach (United States) S Melville	6^{7}	7	7	6
8	(Czech Republic) C Suk (Czech Republic) D Vacek	7^{9}	5	5	3

Second round
1	(Netherlands) J Eltingh (Netherlands) P Haarhuis	6	6	6
(United States) M Bauer (Australia) J Ireland	3	2	2
(Spain) JA Conde (Portugal) N Marques	6	4	6	4	2
15	(South Africa) L Bale (South Africa) J-L de Jager	4	6	4	6	6
9	(United States) T Ho (New Zealand) B Steven	0^{r}
(Italy) C Brandi (South Africa) M Ondruska	0
(Australia) J Eagle (Australia) A Florent	6	3	3	3
(United States) R Leach (United States) S Melville	4	6	6	6

Third round
1	(Netherlands) J Eltingh (Netherlands) P Haarhuis	6	6	3	6
15	(South Africa) L Bale (South Africa) J-L de Jager	3	2	6	3
(Italy) C Brandi (South Africa) M Ondruska	3	6^{3}	1
(United States) R Leach (United States) S Melville	6	7^{7}	6

Quarterfinals
1	(Netherlands) J Eltingh (Netherlands) P Haarhuis	4	4	6	6^{5}
(United States) R Leach (United States) S Melville	6	6	3	7^{7}

==== Section 2 ====
First round
4	(Zimbabwe) B Black (United States) J Stark	6	6	6
(South Africa) D Adams (Netherlands) T Nijssen	1	4	1
(Canada) S Lareau (United States) B MacPhie	6	6	7^{7}
Q	(United States) D Flach (United States) M Joyce	3	2	6^{4}
(Netherlands) S Noteboom (Netherlands) F Wibier	7^{7}	5	6	6
(United States) L Jensen (United States) M Jensen	6^{1}	7	3	4
(Australia) A Kratzmann (Kenya) P Wekesa	4	4	4
14	(Germany) M-K Goellner (Russia) Y Kafelnikov	6	6	6
12	(Russia) A Olhovskiy (Netherlands) J Siemerink	5	6	7	6
(United States) D Randall (United States) G Van Emburgh	7	3	5	4
WC	(United Kingdom) A Foster (United Kingdom) D Sapsford	2	6^{1}	3
(Netherlands) T Kempers (Australia) P Kilderry	6	7^{7}	6
(Australia) W Arthurs (United Kingdom) N Broad	6^{5}	7^{7}	6	3	3
WC	(United Kingdom) B Cowan (United Kingdom) A Richardson	7^{7}	6^{0}	3	6	6
(Spain) T Carbonell (Spain) F Roig	6^{4}	6	6	4	3
6	(United States) J Palmer (United States) R Reneberg	7^{7}	3	3	6	6

Second round
4	(Zimbabwe) B Black (United States) J Stark	4	6	6	7
(Canada) S Lareau (United States) B MacPhie	6	3	3	5
(Netherlands) S Noteboom (Netherlands) F Wibier	1	4	5
14	(Germany) M-K Goellner (Russia) Y Kafelnikov	6	6	7
12	(Russia) A Olhovskiy (Netherlands) J Siemerink	6	7	4	7^{7}
(Netherlands) T Kempers (Australia) P Kilderry	4	5	6	6^{1}
WC	(United Kingdom) B Cowan (United Kingdom) A Richardson	3	4	6	5
6	(United States) J Palmer (United States) R Reneberg	6	6	1	7

Third round
4	(Zimbabwe) B Black (United States) J Stark	6^{4}	6^{3}	6^{6}
14	(Germany) M-K Goellner (Russia) Y Kafelnikov	7^{7}	7^{7}	7^{8}
12	(Russia) A Olhovskiy (Netherlands) J Siemerink	7^{7}	7	6^{5}	6
6	(United States) J Palmer (United States) R Reneberg	6^{2}	5	7^{7}	3

Quarterfinals
14	(Germany) M-K Goellner (Russia) Y Kafelnikov	7^{7}	6^{3}	6	6
12	(Russia) A Olhovskiy (Netherlands) J Siemerink	6^{5}	7^{7}	3	4

=== Bottom half ===
==== Section 3 ====
First round
5	(United States) J Grabb (United States) P McEnroe	4	4	6	5
Q	(Australia) S Draper (Australia) P Tramacchi	6	6	1	7
(United States) D Johnson (United States) K Thorne	3	4	4
(France) O Delaître (Germany) D Prinosil	6	6	6
(United States) K Jones (United States) D Pate	0	2	7^{7}	7^{9}	12
(Australia) J Fitzgerald (Sweden) A Järryd	6	6	6^{5}	6^{7}	10
(Mexico) L Lavalle (United States) F Montana	6^{2}	4	4
11	(The Bahamas) M Knowles (Canada) D Nestor	7^{7}	6	6
13	(United States) A O'Brien (Australia) S Stolle	2	7	6	6
(South Africa) M Barnard (South Africa) E Ferreira	6	5	3	4
(Italy) D Nargiso (France) G Raoux	6	3	7^{7}	7^{7}
(Czech Republic) K Nováček (Sweden) M Wilander	1	6	6^{5}	6^{2}
(Argentina) J Frana (South Africa) G Muller	2	7	6	3	13
(United States) S Davis (United States) M Lucena	6	6^{4}	3	6	15
(France) G Forget (Switzerland) J Hlasek	3	6	7^{7}	6
3	(Canada) G Connell (United States) P Galbraith	6	1	6^{3}	3

Second round
Q	(Australia) S Draper (Australia) P Tramacchi	6^{6}	6	7^{7}	6^{0}	0
(France) O Delaître (Germany) D Prinosil	7^{8}	2	6^{3}	7^{7}	6
(United States) K Jones (United States) D Pate	4	6^{5}	3
11	(The Bahamas) M Knowles (Canada) D Nestor	6	7^{7}	6
13	(United States) A O'Brien (Australia) S Stolle	7^{8}	6	6
(Italy) D Nargiso (France) G Raoux	6^{6}	3	4
(United States) S Davis (United States) M Lucena	6^{0}	3	4
(France) G Forget (Switzerland) J Hlasek	7^{7}	6	6

Third round
(France) O Delaître (Germany) D Prinosil	2	2	2
11	(The Bahamas) M Knowles (Canada) D Nestor	6	6	6
13	(United States) A O'Brien (Australia) S Stolle	6	6^{2}	6^{3}	6^{3}
(France) G Forget (Switzerland) J Hlasek	2	7^{7}	7^{7}	7^{7}

Quarterfinals
11	(The Bahamas) M Knowles (Canada) D Nestor	6	6	6
(France) G Forget (Switzerland) J Hlasek	4	4	4

==== Section 4 ====
First round
7	(Sweden) J Apell (Sweden) J Björkman	7^{7}	7^{9}	6
(South Africa) B Haygarth (South Africa) D Visser	6^{3}	6^{7}	4
(Austria) A Antonitsch (United States) K Kinnear	6	7^{7}	6
(Sweden) O Kristiansson (Sweden) L-A Wahlgren	3	6^{0}	3
(Sweden) R Bergh (United States) J Waite	7^{9}	3	7^{10}	3	5
(Australia) M Philippoussis (Australia) P Rafter	6^{7}	6	6^{8}	6	7
(Argentina) P Arnold (Mexico) J Lozano	0	6	3	2
10	(United States) T Kronemann (Australia) D Macpherson	6	2	6	6
16	(South Africa) P Norval (Netherlands) M Oosting	4	6	3	7^{7}	6
LL	(Australia) G Doyle (Australia) T Larkham	6	3	6	6^{3}	3
(Czech Republic) V Flégl (United States) B Shelton	6^{5}	7	4	5
WC	(United Kingdom) P Hand (United Kingdom) R Matheson	7^{7}	5	6	7
(Sweden) H Holm (United States) J Tarango	6^{7}	6	3	6
WC	(United Kingdom) J Bates (United Kingdom) T Henman	7^{9}	2	6	6^{d}
WC	(United States) K Flach (United States) R Seguso	4	0	0
2	(Australia) T Woodbridge (Australia) M Woodforde	6	6	6

Second round
7	(Sweden) J Apell (Sweden) J Björkman	7^{7}	7^{7}	6
(Austria) A Antonitsch (United States) K Kinnear	6^{3}	6^{5}	3
(Australia) M Philippoussis (Australia) P Rafter	5	6	4	6	6
10	(United States) T Kronemann (Australia) D Macpherson	7	4	6	2	4
16	(South Africa) P Norval (Netherlands) M Oosting	6	6	6
WC	(United Kingdom) P Hand (United Kingdom) R Matheson	2	4	4
(Sweden) H Holm (United States) J Tarango	4	1	4
2	(Australia) T Woodbridge (Australia) M Woodforde	6	6	6

Third round
7	(Sweden) J Apell (Sweden) J Björkman	3	4	4
(Australia) M Philippoussis (Australia) P Rafter	6	6	6
16	(South Africa) P Norval (Netherlands) M Oosting	3	6^{7}	3
2	(Australia) T Woodbridge (Australia) M Woodforde	6	7^{9}	6

Quarterfinals
(Australia) M Philippoussis (Australia) P Rafter	2	6	2	6^{7}
2	(Australia) T Woodbridge (Australia) M Woodforde	6	1	6	7^{9}
