= 1995 Wimbledon Championships – Women's singles =

Women's singles
- 1995 Wimbledon Championships

Final
- Champion: (Germany) Steffi Graf
- Runner-up: (Spain) Arantxa Sánchez Vicario
- Score: 4–6, 6–1, 7–5

Details
- Draw: 128 (8 Q / 8 WC )
- Seeds: 16

Events
Singles	men	women		boys	girls
Doubles	men	women	mixed	boys	girls
WC Singles	men	women	quad
WC Doubles	men	women	quad
Legends	men	women	seniors
← 1994 ·	Wimbledon Championships	· 1996 →

Steffi Graf defeated Arantxa Sánchez Vicario in the final, 4–6, 6–1, 7–5 to win the ladies' singles tennis title at the 1995 Wimbledon Championships. It was her sixth Wimbledon singles title and 17th major singles title overall.

Conchita Martínez was the defending champion, but lost in the semifinals to Sánchez Vicario.

The second-round match between Patricia Hy-Boulais and Chanda Rubin was the longest-ever women's match at Wimbledon, lasting three hours and 45 minutes. Rubin defeated Hy-Boulais, 7–6^{(7–4)}, 6–7^{(5–7)}, 17–15.

== Seeds ==
1. (Germany) Steffi Graf (champion)
2. (Spain) Arantxa Sánchez Vicario (final)
3. (Spain) Conchita Martínez (semifinals)
4. (Czech Republic) Jana Novotná (semifinals)
5. (France) Mary Pierce (second round)
6. (Japan) Kimiko Date (quarterfinals)
7. (United States) Lindsay Davenport (fourth round)
8. (Argentina) Gabriela Sabatini (quarterfinals)
9. (Germany) Anke Huber (fourth round)
10. (Belarus) Natasha Zvereva (third round)
11. (Croatia) Iva Majoli (first round)
12. (United States) Amy Frazier (second round)
13. (United States) Mary Joe Fernández (quarterfinals)
14. (Japan) Naoko Sawamatsu (third round)
15. (Netherlands) Brenda Schultz-McCarthy (quarterfinals)
16. (Czech Republic) Helena Suková (second round)

Click on the seed number of a player to go to their draw section.

== Draw ==
=== Key ===
- Q = Qualifier
- WC = Wild card
- LL = Lucky loser
- Alt = Alternate
- ITF = ITF entry
- PR = Protected ranking
- SR = Special ranking
- SE = Special exempt
- JE = Junior exempt
- JR = Junior Accelerator Programme entrant
- CO = College Accelerator Programme entrant
- NG = Next Gen Accelerator Program entrant
- w/o = Walkover
- r = Retired
- d = Defaulted

=== Finals ===
Quarterfinals
1	(Germany) Steffi Graf	6	6
13	(United States) Mary Joe Fernández	3	0
4	(Czech Republic) Jana Novotná	6	6
6	(Japan) Kimiko Date	2	3
8	(Argentina) Gabriela Sabatini	5	6^{5}
3	(Spain) Conchita Martínez	7	7^{7}
15	(Netherlands) Brenda Schultz-McCarthy	4	6^{4}
2	(Spain) Arantxa Sánchez Vicario	6	7^{7}

Semifinals
1	(Germany) Steffi Graf	5	6	6
4	(Czech Republic) Jana Novotná	7	4	2
3	(Spain) Conchita Martínez	3	7^{7}	1
2	(Spain) Arantxa Sánchez Vicario	6	6^{5}	6

Final
1	(Germany) Steffi Graf	4	6	7
2	(Spain) Arantxa Sánchez Vicario	6	1	5

=== Top half ===
==== Section 1 ====
First round
1	(Germany) S Graf	6	6
(Switzerland) M Hingis	3	1
(Austria) P Schwarz-Ritter	6	2	2
(South Africa) A Coetzer	4	6	6
(Spain) V Ruano Pascual	4	3
(Netherlands) K Boogert	6	6
(Russia) E Makarova	6	1	8
(United States) M Werdel-Witmeyer	3	6	6
Q	(Australia) R Stubbs	5	6	6
(Belarus) T Ignatieva	7	1	1
(Argentina) I Gorrochategui	6	6
(Germany) W Probst	1	3
Q	(United States) L Lee	3	6	6
(United States) P Shriver	6	1	4
WC	(United Kingdom) M Miller	2	3
10	(Belarus) N Zvereva	6	6

Second round
1	(Germany) S Graf	6	7
(South Africa) A Coetzer	3	5
(Netherlands) K Boogert	6	6
(Russia) E Makarova	0	2
Q	(Australia) R Stubbs	3	2
(Argentina) I Gorrochategui	6	6
Q	(United States) L Lee	7^{7}	1	4
10	(Belarus) N Zvereva	6^{5}	6	6

Third round
1	(Germany) S Graf	6	6
(Netherlands) K Boogert	1	0
(Argentina) I Gorrochategui	2	6	6
10	(Belarus) N Zvereva	6	4	4

Fourth round
1	(Germany) S Graf	6	6
(Argentina) I Gorrochategui	0	1

==== Section 2 ====
First round
13	(United States) MJ Fernández	5	6	6
(Slovakia) K Habšudová	7	3	3
(South Korea) S-h Park	6	6
(France) A Fusai	1	4
Q	(Austria) M Schnell	6	7
(Bulgaria) K Maleeva	0	5
(Romania) R Dragomir	6	4	4
(Netherlands) M Oremans	4	6	6
(Australia) K Radford	4	6	5
(Austria) B Paulus	6	4	7
WC	(United Kingdom) E Jelfs	4	3
(Germany) C Singer	6	6
WC	(United Kingdom) S-A Siddall	2	3
(Argentina) F Labat	6	6
(United States) G Fernández	2	6	5
7	(United States) L Davenport	6	4	7

Second round
13	(United States) MJ Fernández	6	6
(South Korea) S-h Park	4	0
Q	(Austria) M Schnell	3	4
(Netherlands) M Oremans	6	6
(Austria) B Paulus	2	4
(Germany) C Singer	6	6
(Argentina) F Labat	1	1
7	(United States) L Davenport	6	6

Third round
13	(United States) MJ Fernández	6	6
(Netherlands) M Oremans	1	2
(Germany) C Singer	7^{10}	3	2
7	(United States) L Davenport	6^{8}	6	6

Fourth round
13	(United States) MJ Fernández	7^{8}	6
7	(United States) L Davenport	6^{6}	1

==== Section 3 ====
First round
4	(Czech Republic) J Novotná	6	6
(Germany) K Kschwendt	4	4
WC	(United Kingdom) J Durie	6	7^{7}
(France) A Dechaume-Balleret	2	6^{2}
Q	(Germany) C Porwik	4	3
(Austria) J Wiesner	6	6
(France) S Testud	7	6
(Japan) N Miyagi	5	3
(Australia) N Bradtke	6	6
(Germany) E Wagner	2	4
(France) J Halard	5	6	4
(Canada) J Nejedly	7	4	6
(Germany) P Begerow	6^{5}	0^{r}
WC	(South Africa) R Nideffer	7^{7}	1
(Mexico) A Gavaldón	1	6	6
11	(Croatia) I Majoli	6	3	1

Second round
4	(Czech Republic) J Novotná	6	6
WC	(United Kingdom) J Durie	2	2
(Austria) J Wiesner	6	3	6
(France) S Testud	4	6	0
(Australia) N Bradtke	6	6
(Canada) J Nejedly	3	3
WC	(South Africa) R Nideffer	1	2
(Mexico) A Gavaldón	6	6

Third round
4	(Czech Republic) J Novotná	7	6
(Austria) J Wiesner	5	4
(Australia) N Bradtke	6	6
(Mexico) A Gavaldón	2	1

Fourth round
4	(Czech Republic) J Novotná	6	5	6
(Australia) N Bradtke	0	7	4

==== Section 4 ====
First round
16	(Czech Republic) H Suková	6	7^{7}
(Italy) A-M Cecchini	3	6^{5}
(United States) J Watanabe	4	2
(Japan) Y Kamio	6	6
(South Africa) M de Swardt	6	6
(Italy) L Golarsa	3	3
(France) I Demongeot	6	6
WC	(United Kingdom) C Wood	2	3
(United States) A Grossman	3	6	6
(United States) A Keller	6	2	4
(United States) T Whitlinger-Jones	7^{7}	6
(United States) K Po	6^{5}	0
(Italy) F Perfetti	6	2	4
(Germany) M Babel	2	6	6
(Belgium) S Appelmans	4	2
6	(Japan) K Date	6	6

Second round
16	(Czech Republic) H Suková	6	4	4
(Japan) Y Kamio	4	6	6
(South Africa) M de Swardt	6	6
(France) I Demongeot	4	3
(United States) A Grossman	1	4
(United States) T Whitlinger-Jones	6	6
(Germany) M Babel	5	6^{4}
6	(Japan) K Date	7	7^{7}

Third round
(Japan) Y Kamio	4	4
(South Africa) M de Swardt	6	6
(United States) T Whitlinger-Jones	6	3	3
6	(Japan) K Date	1	6	6

Fourth round
(South Africa) M de Swardt	1	6	2
6	(Japan) K Date	6	2	6

=== Bottom half ===
==== Section 5 ====
First round
8	(Argentina) G Sabatini	6	6
(France) L Ghirardi	3	4
(Russia) E Likhovtseva	3	1
(Italy) S Farina	6	6
(Belgium) D Monami	6	6
(United States) P Fendick	2	3
(Belgium) N Feber	6	6
(United States) N Arendt	3	1
(United States) L Raymond	6	7^{7}
WC	(United Kingdom) J Pullin	0	6^{5}
(United States) L Harvey-Wild	1	2
(Australia) R McQuillan	6	6
(Romania) I Spîrlea	6	3	6
(South Africa) J Kruger	2	6	4
(Netherlands) S Rottier	4	5
12	(United States) A Frazier	6	7

Second round
8	(Argentina) G Sabatini	6	6
(Italy) S Farina	2	2
(Belgium) D Monami	5	0
(Belgium) N Feber	7	6
(United States) L Raymond	6	6
(Australia) R McQuillan	4	2
(Romania) I Spîrlea	6	6
12	(United States) A Frazier	1	3

Third round
8	(Argentina) G Sabatini	7	6
(Belgium) N Feber	5	1
(United States) L Raymond	6	2	6
(Romania) I Spîrlea	4	6	4

Fourth round
8	(Argentina) G Sabatini	6	3	7
(United States) L Raymond	0	6	5

==== Section 6 ====
First round
14	(Japan) N Sawamatsu	4	6	6
(United States) L McNeil	6	0	3
(Germany) S Meier	5	0
(Sweden) M Strandlund	7	6
(United States) S Cacic	6	6
Q	(United States) K Adams	4	2
(France) S Pitkowski	1	2
Q	(Netherlands) P Kamstra	6	6
(Hungary) A Temesvári	7^{7}	6
Q	(Italy) G Pizzichini	6^{5}	4
(United States) S Stafford	6	6
(Germany) V Martinek	4	1
WC	(United Kingdom) K Cross	3	1
(Germany) J Kandarr	6	6
(Sweden) Å Carlsson	1	1
3	(Spain) C Martínez	6	6

Second round
14	(Japan) N Sawamatsu	3	6	6
(Sweden) M Strandlund	6	4	0
(United States) S Cacic	5	6^{7}
Q	(Netherlands) P Kamstra	7	7^{9}
(Hungary) A Temesvári	5	2
(United States) S Stafford	7	6
(Germany) J Kandarr	4	3
3	(Spain) C Martínez	6	6

Third round
14	(Japan) N Sawamatsu	1	6^{5}
Q	(Netherlands) P Kamstra	6	7^{7}
(United States) S Stafford	1	1
3	(Spain) C Martínez	6	6

Fourth round
Q	(Netherlands) P Kamstra	2	3
3	(Spain) C Martínez	6	6

==== Section 7 ====
First round
5	(France) M Pierce	6	6
(Austria) S Dopfer	1	2
(France) N Tauziat	6	4	7
LL	(Venezuela) M Vento	1	6	5
(Indonesia) Y Basuki	6	6^{4}	6
(Ukraine) N Medvedeva	2	7^{7}	2
(United States) D Graham	3	6	1
(Japan) K Nagatsuka	6	4	6
(Israel) A Smashnova	3	6^{4}
(Slovakia) R Zrubáková	6	7^{7}
(Belgium) L Courtois	4	6	6
(United States) M McGrath	6	0	2
(Latvia) L Neiland	6	6
(Spain) N Ávila Bonastre	0	1
(Czech Republic) R Bobková	7^{7}	6^{3}	1
15	(Netherlands) B Schultz-McCarthy	6^{4}	7^{7}	6

Second round
5	(France) M Pierce	4	6	1
(France) N Tauziat	6	3	6
(Indonesia) Y Basuki	7	6
(Japan) K Nagatsuka	5	0
(Slovakia) R Zrubáková	6	6
(Belgium) L Courtois	3	2
(Latvia) L Neiland	2	4
15	(Netherlands) B Schultz-McCarthy	6	6

Third round
(France) N Tauziat	7^{7}	3	4
(Indonesia) Y Basuki	6^{4}	6	6
(Slovakia) R Zrubáková	4	5
15	(Netherlands) B Schultz-McCarthy	6	7

Fourth round
(Indonesia) Y Basuki	3	1
15	(Netherlands) B Schultz-McCarthy	6	6

==== Section 8 ====
First round
9	(Germany) A Huber	6^{5}	6	6
(Slovenia) T Križan	7^{7}	1	1
(Austria) B Reinstadler	3	6	6
(Japan) A Sugiyama	6	4	3
(Germany) S Frankl	3	0
(Canada) P Hy-Boulais	6	6
(Czech Republic) L Richterová	1	3
(United States) C Rubin	6	6
Q	(United Kingdom) A Wainwright	3	3
(United States) Z Garrison-Jackson	6	6
(South Africa) E Reinach	6	3	6
(Germany) M Kochta	1	6	0
(Italy) N Baudone	3	6^{5}
(Japan) M Endo	6	7^{7}
(Slovakia) K Studeníková	2	1
2	(Spain) A Sánchez Vicario	6	6

Second round
9	(Germany) A Huber	6	7^{7}
(Austria) B Reinstadler	2	6^{5}
(Canada) P Hy-Boulais	6^{4}	7^{7}	15
(United States) C Rubin	7^{7}	6^{5}	17
(United States) Z Garrison-Jackson	6	6
(South Africa) E Reinach	4	2
(Japan) M Endo	5	2
2	(Spain) A Sánchez Vicario	7	6

Third round
9	(Germany) A Huber	6	6
(United States) C Rubin	2	4
(United States) Z Garrison-Jackson	1	2
2	(Spain) A Sánchez Vicario	6	6

Fourth round
9	(Germany) A Huber	5	4
2	(Spain) A Sánchez Vicario	7	6

Preceded by 1995 French Open – Women's singles	Grand Slam women's singles	Succeeded by 1995 US Open – Women's singles
