= 1995 Wimbledon Championships – Women's doubles =

Women's tennis competition

Women's doubles
- 1995 Wimbledon Championships

Final
- Champions: (Czechoslovakia) Jana Novotná (Spain) Arantxa Sánchez Vicario
- Runners-up: (United States) Gigi Fernández (Belarus) Natasha Zvereva
- Score: 5–7, 7–5, 6–4

Details
- Draw: 64 (2 Q / 3 WC )
- Seeds: 16

Events
Singles	men	women		boys	girls
Doubles	men	women	mixed	boys	girls
WC Singles	men	women	quad
WC Doubles	men	women	quad
Legends	men	women	seniors
← 1994 ·	Wimbledon Championships	· 1996 →

Jana Novotná and Arantxa Sánchez Vicario defeated the three-time defending champions Gigi Fernández and Natasha Zvereva in the final, 5–7, 7–5, 6–4 to win the ladies' doubles tennis title at the 1995 Wimbledon Championships.

== Seeds ==
1. (United States) Gigi Fernández / (Belarus) Natasha Zvereva (final)
2. (Czech Republic) Jana Novotná / (Spain) Arantxa Sánchez Vicario (champions)
3. (Germany) Steffi Graf / (United States) Martina Navratilova (withdrew)
4. (United States) Lindsay Davenport / (United States) Lisa Raymond (first round)
5. (United States) Meredith McGrath / (Latvia) Larisa Neiland (semifinals)
6. (United States) Patty Fendick / (United States) Mary Joe Fernández (first round)
7. (Netherlands) Manon Bollegraf / (Australia) Rennae Stubbs (third round)
8. (United States) Nicole Arendt / (United States) Pam Shriver (quarterfinals)
9. (Argentina) Gabriela Sabatini / (Netherlands) Brenda Schultz-McCarthy (semifinals)
10. (France) Julie Halard / (France) Nathalie Tauziat (third round)
11. (Spain) Conchita Martínez / (Argentina) Patricia Tarabini (quarterfinals)
12. (South Africa) Amanda Coetzer / (Argentina) Inés Gorrochategui (second round)
13. (South Africa) Elna Reinach / (Romania) Irina Spîrlea (third round)
14. (United States) Katrina Adams / (United States) Zina Garrison-Jackson (third round)
15. (Russia) Elena Makarova / (Russia) Eugenia Maniokova (first round)
16. (United States) Linda Harvey-Wild / (United States) Chanda Rubin (second round)
17. (Netherlands) Kristie Boogert / (Netherlands) Nicole Muns-Jagerman (third round)

Click on the seed number of a player to go to their draw section.

== Draw ==
=== Key ===
- Q = Qualifier
- WC = Wild card
- LL = Lucky loser
- Alt = Alternate
- ITF = ITF entry
- PR = Protected ranking
- SR = Special ranking
- SE = Special exempt
- JE = Junior exempt
- JR = Junior Accelerator Programme entrant
- CO = College Accelerator Programme entrant
- NG = Next Gen Accelerator Program entrant
- w/o = Walkover
- r = Retired
- d = Defaulted

=== Finals ===
Quarterfinals
1	(United States) Gigi Fernández (Belarus) Natasha Zvereva	6	6
11	(Spain) Conchita Martínez (Argentina) Patricia Tarabini	2	1
5	(United States) Meredith McGrath (Latvia) Larisa Neiland	4	6	6
(United States) Lori McNeil (Czech Republic) Helena Suková	6	4	3
9	(Argentina) Gabriela Sabatini (Netherlands) Brenda Schultz-McCarthy	6	7^{7}
(United States) Amy Frazier (United States) Kimberly Po	1	6^{2}
8	(United States) Nicole Arendt (United States) Pam Shriver	6^{3}	5
2	(Czech Republic) Jana Novotná (Spain) Arantxa Sánchez Vicario	7^{7}	7

Semifinals
1	(United States) Gigi Fernández (Belarus) Natasha Zvereva	7^{7}	6^{7}	6
5	(United States) Meredith McGrath (Latvia) Larisa Neiland	6^{5}	7^{9}	2
9	(Argentina) Gabriela Sabatini (Netherlands) Brenda Schultz-McCarthy	6^{5}	7^{7}	4
2	(Czech Republic) Jana Novotná (Spain) Arantxa Sánchez Vicario	7^{7}	6^{4}	6

Final
1	(United States) Gigi Fernández (Belarus) Natasha Zvereva	7	5	4
2	(Czech Republic) Jana Novotná (Spain) Arantxa Sánchez Vicario	5	7	6

=== Top half ===
==== Section 1 ====
First round
1	(United States) G Fernández (Belarus) N Zvereva	6^{4}	6	6
(Canada) M Bernard (Canada) C Delisle	7^{7}	0	4
(Australia) K-A Guse (United Kingdom) V Lake	6	7^{7}
WC	(United Kingdom) S-A Siddall (United Kingdom) A Wainwright	1	6^{2}
(Sweden) M Lindström (Sweden) M Strandlund	5	6	6
(Czech Republic) P Langrová (Czech Republic) H Vildová	7	1	1
(Germany) C Porwik (Germany) C Singer	5	4
17	(Netherlands) K Boogert (Netherlands) N Muns-Jagerman	7	6
11	(Spain) C Martínez (Argentina) P Tarabini	6	3	10
Q	(Australia) K Godridge (Australia) K Sharpe	4	6	8
(Bulgaria) K Maleeva (Ukraine) N Medvedeva	6	1	6
(Germany) K Kschwendt (Canada) R Simpson	4	6	2
(South Africa) L Horn (Belgium) D Monami	1	7^{7}	0
(Switzerland) M Hingis (Slovakia) R Zrubáková	6	6^{2}	6
(Belgium) L Courtois (Belgium) N Feber	1	3
7	(Netherlands) M Bollegraf (Australia) R Stubbs	6	6

Second round
1	(United States) G Fernández (Belarus) N Zvereva	6	6
(Australia) K-A Guse (United Kingdom) V Lake	3	1
(Sweden) M Lindström (Sweden) M Strandlund	2	6^{5}
17	(Netherlands) K Boogert (Netherlands) N Muns-Jagerman	6	7^{7}
11	(Spain) C Martínez (Argentina) P Tarabini	3	6	6
(Bulgaria) K Maleeva (Ukraine) N Medvedeva	6	4	4
(Switzerland) M Hingis (Slovakia) R Zrubáková	6	2	4
7	(Netherlands) M Bollegraf (Australia) R Stubbs	3	6	6

Third round
1	(United States) G Fernández (Belarus) N Zvereva	6	6
17	(Netherlands) K Boogert (Netherlands) N Muns-Jagerman	2	2
11	(Spain) C Martínez (Argentina) P Tarabini	6	6
7	(Netherlands) M Bollegraf (Australia) R Stubbs	3	3

Quarterfinals
1	(United States) G Fernández (Belarus) N Zvereva	6	6
11	(Spain) C Martínez (Argentina) P Tarabini	2	1

==== Section 2 ====
First round
5	(United States) M McGrath (Latvia) L Neiland	6	6
(Finland) N Dahlman (Ukraine) O Lugina	3	1
(Argentina) M Paz (United States) S Stafford	6	7
(Russia) E Likhovtseva (Germany) E Wagner	3	5
(Italy) L Golarsa (Netherlands) C Vis	1	2
(Germany) M Babel (Italy) S Farina	6	6
(United States) E Nagelsen (United States) R White	2	7^{7}	1
13	(South Africa) E Reinach (Romania) I Spîrlea	6	6^{4}	6
15	(Russia) E Makarova (Russia) E Maniokova	3	1
(Belgium) S Appelmans (Netherlands) M Oremans	6	6
(United Kingdom) J Durie (United Kingdom) C Wood	6	6
(France) N van Lottum (Czech Republic) E Melicharová	2	3
(Croatia) I Majoli (South Africa) M de Swardt	4	6	6
(United States) D Graham (Canada) J Hetherington	6	2	4
(United States) L McNeil (Czech Republic) H Suková	7^{7}	3	7
6	(United States) P Fendick (United States) MJ Fernández	6^{1}	6	5

Second round
5	(United States) M McGrath (Latvia) L Neiland	6	6
(Argentina) M Paz (United States) S Stafford	1	0
(Germany) M Babel (Italy) S Farina	1	3
13	(South Africa) E Reinach (Romania) I Spîrlea	6	6
(Belgium) S Appelmans (Netherlands) M Oremans	6	6
(United Kingdom) J Durie (United Kingdom) C Wood	4	4
(Croatia) I Majoli (South Africa) M de Swardt	7^{7}	1	6
(United States) L McNeil (Czech Republic) H Suková	6^{5}	6	8

Third round
5	(United States) M McGrath (Latvia) L Neiland	6	6
13	(South Africa) E Reinach (Romania) I Spîrlea	2	4
(Belgium) S Appelmans (Netherlands) M Oremans	3	4
(United States) L McNeil (Czech Republic) H Suková	6	6

Quarterfinals
5	(United States) M McGrath (Latvia) L Neiland	4	6	6
(United States) L McNeil (Czech Republic) H Suková	6	4	3

=== Bottom half ===
==== Section 3 ====
First round
9	(Argentina) G Sabatini (Netherlands) B Schultz-McCarthy	6	6
(Germany) W Probst (United States) D Scott	2	1
WC	(United Kingdom) J Pullin (United Kingdom) L Woodroffe	7^{7}	1	3
(United States) M Werdel-Witmeyer (United States) T Whitlinger-Jones	6^{4}	6	6
(France) A Dechaume-Balleret (Argentina) F Labat	2	6	8
(France) S Amiach (France) S Testud	6	4	10
(Japan) Y Kamio (Japan) H Nagano	2	3
10	(France) J Halard (France) N Tauziat	6	6
16	(United States) L Harvey-Wild (United States) C Rubin	6	6
(Australia) C Barclay (Canada) P Hy-Boulais	4	2
(Netherlands) I Driehuis (Australia) L Pleming	7	4	0
(Italy) A-M Cecchini (France) I Demongeot	5	6	6
(Japan) K Nagatsuka (Japan) A Sugiyama	6^{5}	5
(Sweden) Å Carlsson (Hungary) A Temesvári	7^{7}	7
(United States) A Frazier (United States) K Po	4	7^{7}	6
4	(United States) L Davenport (United States) L Raymond	6	6^{4}	1

Second round
9	(Argentina) G Sabatini (Netherlands) B Schultz-McCarthy	6	6
(United States) M Werdel-Witmeyer (United States) T Whitlinger-Jones	2	4
(France) S Amiach (France) S Testud	0	3
10	(France) J Halard (France) N Tauziat	6	6
16	(United States) L Harvey-Wild (United States) C Rubin	6	1	4
(Italy) A-M Cecchini (France) I Demongeot	1	6	6
(Sweden) Å Carlsson (Hungary) A Temesvári	2	4
(United States) A Frazier (United States) K Po	6	6

Third round
9	(Argentina) G Sabatini (Netherlands) B Schultz-McCarthy	6	6
10	(France) J Halard (France) N Tauziat	2	4
(Italy) A-M Cecchini (France) I Demongeot	5	1
(United States) A Frazier (United States) K Po	7	6

Quarterfinals
9	(Argentina) G Sabatini (Netherlands) B Schultz-McCarthy	6	7^{7}
(United States) A Frazier (United States) K Po	1	6^{2}

==== Section 4 ====
First round
8	(United States) N Arendt (United States) P Shriver	6	6
(Italy) L Garrone (Italy) R Grande	4	2
LL	(South Africa) J Kruger (Austria) P Schwarz-Ritter	2	1
(Australia) N Bradtke (Australia) K Radford	6	6
(Czech Republic) R Bobková (Netherlands) M Koutstaal	6	6
(Romania) R Dragomir (United States) A Grossman	2	4
Q	(Netherlands) Y Basting (Netherlands) P Kamstra	3	5
12	(South Africa) A Coetzer (Argentina) I Gorrochategui	6	7
14	(United States) K Adams (United States) Z Garrison-Jackson	6	6
(Japan) R Hiraki (South Korea) S-h Park	4	3
(United States) L Poruri (United States) M Tu	1	4
(France) A Fusai (Slovakia) K Habšudová	6	6
(Belgium) E Callens (Australia) R McQuillan	6	6
WC	(United Kingdom) E Bond (United Kingdom) J Moore	1	1
(Indonesia) Y Basuki (Japan) N Miyagi	2	3
2	(Czech Republic) J Novotná (Spain) A Sánchez Vicario	6	6

Second round
8	(United States) N Arendt (United States) P Shriver	1	7^{7}	11
(Australia) N Bradtke (Australia) K Radford	6	6^{1}	9
(Czech Republic) R Bobková (Netherlands) M Koutstaal	6	6
12	(South Africa) A Coetzer (Argentina) I Gorrochategui	4	3
14	(United States) K Adams (United States) Z Garrison-Jackson	6	6
(France) A Fusai (Slovakia) K Habšudová	0	0
(Belgium) E Callens (Australia) R McQuillan	6^{5}	1
2	(Czech Republic) J Novotná (Spain) A Sánchez Vicario	7^{7}	6

Third round
8	(United States) N Arendt (United States) P Shriver	6	7
(Czech Republic) R Bobková (Netherlands) M Koutstaal	3	5
14	(United States) K Adams (United States) Z Garrison-Jackson	6	4	3
2	(Czech Republic) J Novotná (Spain) A Sánchez Vicario	4	6	6

Quarterfinals
8	(United States) N Arendt (United States) P Shriver	6^{3}	5
2	(Czech Republic) J Novotná (Spain) A Sánchez Vicario	7^{7}	7
