= 1995 Wimbledon Championships – Men's singles =

Men's singles
- 1995 Wimbledon Championships

Final
- Champion: (United States) Pete Sampras
- Runner-up: (Germany) Boris Becker
- Score: 6–7^{(5–7)}, 6–2, 6–4, 6–2

Details
- Draw: 128 (16 Q / 8 WC )
- Seeds: 16

Events
Singles	men	women		boys	girls
Doubles	men	women	mixed	boys	girls
WC Singles	men	women	quad
WC Doubles	men	women	quad
Legends	men	women	seniors
← 1994 ·	Wimbledon Championships	· 1996 →

Two-time defending champion Pete Sampras defeated Boris Becker in the final, 6–7^{(5–7)}, 6–2, 6–4, 6–2 to win the gentlemen's singles tennis title at the 1995 Wimbledon Championships. It was his third Wimbledon title and sixth major title overall.

This remains the most recent edition of Wimbledon where the top four seeds all reached the semifinals.

== Seeds ==
1. (United States) Andre Agassi (semifinals)
2. (United States) Pete Sampras (champion)
3. (Germany) Boris Becker (final)
4. (Croatia) Goran Ivanišević (semifinals)
5. (United States) Michael Chang (second round)
6. (Russia) Yevgeny Kafelnikov (quarterfinals)
7. (South Africa) Wayne Ferreira (fourth round)
8. (Spain) Sergi Bruguera (withdrew)
9. (Germany) Michael Stich (first round)
10. (Switzerland) Marc Rosset (first round)
11. (United States) Jim Courier (second round)
12. (Netherlands) Richard Krajicek (first round)
13. (Sweden) Stefan Edberg (second round)
14. (United States) Todd Martin (fourth round)
15. (Ukraine) Andriy Medvedev (second round)
16. (France) Guy Forget (second round)

Click on the seed number of a player to go to their draw section.

Sergi Bruguera withdrew due to injury. He was replaced in the draw by the highest-ranked non-seeded player Thomas Enqvist. This marked a change in Wimbledon policy, as previously seeded players who withdrew from the tournament were replaced by a qualifier or lucky loser (depending on when the withdrawal occurred).

== Draw ==
=== Key ===
- Q = Qualifier
- WC = Wild card
- LL = Lucky loser
- Alt = Alternate
- ITF = ITF entry
- PR = Protected ranking
- SR = Special ranking
- SE = Special exempt
- JE = Junior exempt
- JR = Junior Accelerator Programme entrant
- CO = College Accelerator Programme entrant
- NG = Next Gen Accelerator Program entrant
- w/o = Walkover
- r = Retired
- d = Defaulted

=== Finals ===
Quarterfinals
1	(United States) Andre Agassi	6	6	6
(Netherlands) Jacco Eltingh	2	3	4
3	(Germany) Boris Becker	6	6	6^{6}	6^{10}	9
(France) Cédric Pioline	3	1	7^{8}	7^{12}	7
6	(Russia) Yevgeny Kafelnikov	5	6^{11}	3
4	(Croatia) Goran Ivanišević	7	7^{13}	6
(Japan) Shuzo Matsuoka	7^{7}	3	4	2
2	(United States) Pete Sampras	6^{5}	6	6	6

Semifinals
1	(United States) Andre Agassi	6	6^{1}	4	6^{1}
3	(Germany) Boris Becker	2	7^{7}	6	7^{7}
4	(Croatia) Goran Ivanišević	6^{7}	6	3	6	3
2	(United States) Pete Sampras	7^{9}	4	6	4	6

Final
3	(Germany) Boris Becker	7^{7}	2	4	2
2	(United States) Pete Sampras	6^{5}	6	6	6

=== Top half ===
==== Section 1 ====
First round
1	(United States) A Agassi	6	6	6
Q	(Australia) A Painter	2	2	1
(United States) R Reneberg	6^{7}	2	3
(United States) P McEnroe	7^{9}	6	6
(United States) D Wheaton	3	7	7^{7}	6
WC	(United Kingdom) R Matheson	6	5	6^{4}	3
WC	(United Kingdom) B Cowan	4	5	1
(Zimbabwe) B Black	6	7	6
(Denmark) K Carlsen	6	6	6
(Czech Republic) B Ulihrach	1	2	1
(Germany) A Mronz	6	7^{7}	1	6
(Netherlands) S Schalken	3	6^{4}	6	3
(United States) J Tarango	6	3	4	6	6
(Hungary) S Noszály	4	6	6	4	2
(Norway) C Ruud	4	2	1
15	(Ukraine) A Medvedev	6	6	6

Second round
1	(United States) A Agassi	6	6	6
(United States) P McEnroe	1	1	3
(United States) D Wheaton	6	6	3	6
(Zimbabwe) B Black	3	2	6	4
(Denmark) K Carlsen	6	6^{1}	5	7	3
(Germany) A Mronz	2	7^{7}	7	5	6
(United States) J Tarango	6	6	4	6
15	(Ukraine) A Medvedev	4	3	6	2

Third round
1	(United States) A Agassi	6	3	6	6
(United States) D Wheaton	2	6	4	2
(Germany) A Mronz	7^{7}	3
(United States) J Tarango	6^{6}	1^{d}

Fourth round
1	(United States) A Agassi	6	6	6
(Germany) A Mronz	3	3	3

==== Section 2 ====
First round
9	(Germany) M Stich	4	6^{3}	1
(Netherlands) J Eltingh	6	7^{7}	6
(France) F Santoro	4	5	6	3
(Russia) A Olhovskiy	6	7	4	6
(Germany) D Prinosil	4	7^{9}	6	3	11
(Germany) M-K Goellner	6	6^{7}	4	6	13
(United Kingdom) M Petchey	6^{3}	1	2
(Sweden) M Wilander	7^{7}	6	6
(United States) V Spadea	4	6^{1}	7	3
(Netherlands) P Haarhuis	6	7^{7}	5	6
(Australia) P Rafter	6	1	6^{2}	4
(Australia) M Woodforde	3	6	7^{7}	6
Q	(Germany) L Burgsmüller	1	1	1
(Sweden) J Björkman	6	6	6
(Czech Republic) D Vacek	2	4	7	4
7	(South Africa) W Ferreira	6	6	5	6

Second round
(Netherlands) J Eltingh	5	6	6	7^{7}
(Russia) A Olhovskiy	7	3	4	6^{4}
(Germany) M-K Goellner	6	7	3	5	4
(Sweden) M Wilander	4	5	6	7	6
(Netherlands) P Haarhuis	3	6^{7}	3
(Australia) M Woodforde	6	7^{9}	6
(Sweden) J Björkman	2	4	3
7	(South Africa) W Ferreira	6	6	6

Third round
(Netherlands) J Eltingh	7^{7}	6	7^{7}
(Sweden) M Wilander	6^{5}	3	6^{4}
(Australia) M Woodforde	1	6	4	7^{7}	2
7	(South Africa) W Ferreira	6	1	6	6^{5}	6

Fourth round
(Netherlands) J Eltingh	6	4	7^{7}	6
7	(South Africa) W Ferreira	4	6	6^{4}	3

==== Section 3 ====
First round
3	(Germany) B Becker	6	6	6
LL	(Spain) E Benfele Álvarez	3	3	4
(Sweden) J Apell	6^{5}	4	7^{7}	6	6
Q	(Australia) J Morgan	7^{7}	6	6^{1}	4	3
(Netherlands) J Siemerink	6	7	3	6
(Russia) A Chesnokov	1	5	6	3
(Czech Republic) C Doseděl	6	3	7^{7}	6
(Slovakia) J Krošlák	1	6	6^{2}	0
(Italy) G Pozzi	7	1	6	7
LL	(France) L Barthez	5	6	4	5
(Australia) T Woodbridge	4	6	6	6
Q	(Australia) P Tramacchi	6	4	2	2
WC	(Australia) P Cash	6^{6}	0^{r}
LL	(Belgium) D Norman	7^{8}	0
(Spain) Ó Martínez	3	3	4
13	(Sweden) S Edberg	6	6	6

Second round
3	(Germany) B Becker	6	3	6	6
(Sweden) J Apell	3	6	1	2
(Netherlands) J Siemerink	6	6	6
(Czech Republic) C Doseděl	3	2	2
(Italy) G Pozzi	3	4	6	2
(Australia) T Woodbridge	6	6	4	6
LL	(Belgium) D Norman	6	6	6
13	(Sweden) S Edberg	3	4	4

Third round
3	(Germany) B Becker	2	6	6	6
(Netherlands) J Siemerink	6	2	2	4
(Australia) T Woodbridge	4	4	6	3
LL	(Belgium) D Norman	6	6	3	6

Fourth round
3	(Germany) B Becker	7^{8}	6	6
LL	(Belgium) D Norman	6^{6}	3	4

==== Section 4 ====
First round
11	(United States) J Courier	7^{7}	3	6	3	6
Q	(United States) K Flach	6^{3}	6	3	6	4
(France) C Pioline	6	6	6
(Spain) A López Morón	1	2	4
Q	(Australia) N Borwick	2	4	1
Q	(Germany) P Baur	6	6	6
(France) G Raoux	4	1^{r}
(Italy) C Caratti	6	0
(Germany) M Zoecke	6	6	4	2	5
(New Zealand) B Steven	4	4	6	6	7
(Australia) J Stoltenberg	7^{7}	6	6
(Italy) A Gaudenzi	6^{3}	3	3
Q	(Italy) D Nargiso	6	4	1	5
(Czech Republic) P Korda	4	6	6	7
(France) L Roux	3	4	6	2
5	(United States) M Chang	6	6	4	6

Second round
11	(United States) J Courier	4	4	4
(France) C Pioline	6	6	6
Q	(Germany) P Baur	6	6	3	6
(Italy) C Caratti	1	4	6	3
(New Zealand) B Steven	6	6	6
(Australia) J Stoltenberg	2	2	2
(Czech Republic) P Korda	6	6	6
5	(United States) M Chang	4	4	4

Third round
(France) C Pioline	6	6	6
Q	(Germany) P Baur	4	4	3
(New Zealand) B Steven	4	2	1
(Czech Republic) P Korda	6	6	6

Fourth round
(France) C Pioline	7^{7}	6	6
(Czech Republic) P Korda	6^{1}	3	2

=== Bottom half ===
==== Section 5 ====
First round
6	(Russia) Y Kafelnikov	6	7	6
(Belgium) F Dewulf	3	5	3
(Germany) B Karbacher	4	7	6	2	6
(Switzerland) J Hlasek	6	5	4	6	4
Q	(United States) L Gloria	6	3	1	6	6
(Germany) J Renzenbrink	4	6	6	3	2
(United States) M Washington	6	6^{9}	4	6	10
(Russia) A Volkov	4	7^{11}	6	4	12
Q	(Sweden) C Bergström	6	6	6^{4}	2	2
(United States) A Krickstein	4	0	7^{7}	6	6
(South Africa) M Ondruska	1	4	5
(Slovakia) K Kučera	6	6	7
(Spain) T Carbonell	6^{10}	7	6^{0}	6	6
Q	(Australia) W Masur	7^{12}	5	7^{7}	4	2
(United States) B Shelton	7^{7}	6	6
12	(Netherlands) R Krajicek	6^{2}	3	3

Second round
6	(Russia) Y Kafelnikov	6	6	7
(Germany) B Karbacher	4	4	5
Q	(United States) L Gloria	6	1	3	7^{7}	4
(Russia) A Volkov	1	6	6	6^{4}	6
(United States) A Krickstein	6	7^{7}	7^{8}
(Slovakia) K Kučera	0	6^{5}	6^{6}
(Spain) T Carbonell	6	6	6
(United States) B Shelton	4	1	3

Third round
6	(Russia) Y Kafelnikov	7^{7}	6	6
(Russia) A Volkov	6^{2}	2	4
(United States) A Krickstein	6^{2}	7	5	6	6
(Spain) T Carbonell	7^{7}	5	7	3	2

Fourth round
6	(Russia) Y Kafelnikov	6	6	6
(United States) A Krickstein	3	3	2

==== Section 6 ====
First round
14	(United States) T Martin	6	3	7^{7}	7
(Venezuela) N Pereira	1	6	6^{4}	5
Q	(Canada) D Nestor	7	6	6
WC	(United Kingdom) D Sapsford	5	2	3
(Australia) M Tebbutt	6	1	6^{6}	4
(Sweden) L Jönsson	4	6	7^{8}	6
(United States) D Rostagno	7^{7}	6	7
(United Kingdom) J Bates	6^{3}	4	5
(France) A Boetsch	7^{8}	6	6
(Portugal) N Marques	6^{6}	2	2
Q	(Canada) A Chang	6	2	3	5
(United States) T Ho	3	6	6	7
(United States) J Stark	4	2	6	3
(Czech Republic) R Vašek	6	6	4	0^{r}
(Canada) S Lareau	2	4	4
4	(Croatia) G Ivanišević	6	6	6

Second round
14	(United States) T Martin	6	7^{7}	6
Q	(Canada) D Nestor	4	6^{4}	3
(Sweden) L Jönsson	1	2	5
(United States) D Rostagno	6	6	7
(France) A Boetsch	6	3	6	7^{7}
(United States) T Ho	4	6	2	6^{4}
(United States) J Stark	4	2	6^{1}
4	(Croatia) G Ivanišević	6	6	7^{7}

Third round
14	(United States) T Martin	6	4	4	6	6
(United States) D Rostagno	3	6	6	2	4
(France) A Boetsch	4	4	4
4	(Croatia) G Ivanišević	6	6	6

Fourth round
14	(United States) T Martin	4	6^{4}	7^{7}	6^{3}
4	(Croatia) G Ivanišević	6	7^{7}	6^{5}	7^{7}

==== Section 7 ====
First round
(Sweden) T Enqvist	6	3	4	2
(Sweden) A Järryd	1	6	6	6
(Argentina) J Frana	6	6	6
(France) H Leconte	3	4	4
(Japan) S Matsuoka	6	6^{5}	3	6	6
(Czech Republic) K Nováček	4	7^{7}	6	3	4
(Chile) M Ríos	6	3	4	6^{4}
Q	(The Bahamas) M Knowles	4	6	6	7^{7}
WC	(United Kingdom) M Maclagan	2	6	7^{7}	6
(Italy) R Furlan	6	2	6^{5}	3
WC	(United Kingdom) C Wilkinson	6	6	7
(Germany) H Dreekmann	3	4	5
Q	(Australia) S Stolle	2	6	6^{4}	3
(Spain) J Burillo	6	3	7^{7}	6
(United States) M Joyce	6	6^{8}	7	6
10	(Switzerland) M Rosset	0	7^{10}	5	2

Second round
(Sweden) A Järryd	1	2	4
(Argentina) J Frana	6	6	6
(Japan) S Matsuoka	6	6	6
Q	(The Bahamas) M Knowles	1	4	2
WC	(United Kingdom) M Maclagan	1	0	2
WC	(United Kingdom) C Wilkinson	6	6	6
(Spain) J Burillo	6^{4}	4	1
(United States) M Joyce	7^{7}	6	6

Third round
(Argentina) J Frana	6^{3}	6	7^{8}	6^{4}	3
(Japan) S Matsuoka	7^{7}	3	6^{6}	7^{7}	6
WC	(United Kingdom) C Wilkinson	7	4	6^{3}	4
(United States) M Joyce	5	6	7^{7}	6

Fourth round
(Japan) S Matsuoka	6	6	6
(United States) M Joyce	3	2	4

==== Section 8 ====
First round
16	(France) G Forget	6	6	7^{7}
WC	(United Kingdom) G Henderson	1	3	6^{5}
(United Kingdom) G Rusedski	6	6	6
LL	(France) S Simian	3	3	3
(France) O Delaître	6	2	1	6	6
(United States) A O'Brien	4	6	6	4	2
LL	(Israel) E Erlich	3	2	2
Q	(Germany) A Thoms	6	6	6
LL	(Australia) S Draper	7	6	5	2	3
(United States) J Palmer	5	3	7	6	6
(Denmark) F Fetterlein	6	7^{7}	6
(Germany) M Sinner	4	6^{4}	3
WC	(United Kingdom) T Henman	7^{7}	6	6
(Kenya) P Wekesa	6^{3}	0	4
(Germany) K Braasch	6^{4}	7^{7}	4	1
2	(United States) P Sampras	7^{7}	6^{2}	6	6

Second round
16	(France) G Forget	6	6^{5}	6^{4}	5
(United Kingdom) G Rusedski	1	7^{7}	7^{7}	7
(France) O Delaître	6	6	6
Q	(Germany) A Thoms	3	4	4
(United States) J Palmer	6	7^{7}	6
(Denmark) F Fetterlein	3	6^{0}	3
WC	(United Kingdom) T Henman	2	3	6^{3}
2	(United States) P Sampras	6	6	7^{7}

Third round
(United Kingdom) G Rusedski	6^{6}	6	6	7^{7}
(France) O Delaître	7^{8}	4	4	6^{3}
(United States) J Palmer	6	4	1	2
2	(United States) P Sampras	4	6	6	6

Fourth round
(United Kingdom) G Rusedski	4	3	5
2	(United States) P Sampras	6	6	7

Preceded by 1995 French Open – Men's singles	Grand Slam men's singles	Succeeded by 1995 US Open – Men's singles
