= 1995 Wimbledon Championships – Mixed doubles =

Mixed doubles
- 1995 Wimbledon Championships

Final
- Champions: (United States) Jonathan Stark (United States) Martina Navratilova
- Runners-up: (Czech Republic) Cyril Suk (United States) Gigi Fernández
- Score: 6–4, 6–4

Details
- Draw: 64 (5WC)
- Seeds: 16

Events
| Singles | men | women | | boys | girls |
| Doubles | men | women | mixed | boys | girls |
| WC Singles | men | women | quad |
| WC Doubles | men | women | quad |
| Legends | men | women | seniors |
- Wimbledon Championships

Todd Woodbridge and Helena Suková were the defending champions but lost in the second round to T. J. Middleton and Lori McNeil.

Jonathan Stark and Martina Navratilova defeated Cyril Suk and Gigi Fernández in the final, 6–4, 6–4 to win the mixed doubles tennis title at the 1995 Wimbledon Championships.

== Seeds ==
1. (Australia) Mark Woodforde / (Latvia) Larisa Neiland (semifinals)
2. (Canada) Grant Connell / (United States) Lindsay Davenport (semifinals)
3. (United States) Jonathan Stark / (United States) Martina Navratilova (champions)
4. (Czech Republic) Cyril Suk / (United States) Gigi Fernández (final)
5. (South Africa) David Adams / (United States) Lisa Raymond (first round)
6. (South Africa) Lan Bale / (United States) Meredith McGrath (first round)
7. (United States) Patrick Galbraith / (South Africa) Elna Reinach (first round)
8. (Russia) Andrei Olhovskiy / (Russia) Eugenia Maniokova (first round)
9. (Australia) Sandon Stolle / (United States) Mary Joe Fernández (quarterfinals)
10. (New Zealand) Brett Steven / (Australia) Nicole Bradtke (third round)
11. (Australia) John Fitzgerald / (Netherlands) Manon Bollegraf (first round)
12. (United States) Rick Leach / (Belarus) Natasha Zvereva (third round)
13. (Netherlands) Menno Oosting / (Netherlands) Kristie Boogert (second round)
14. (United States) Murphy Jensen / (Netherlands) Brenda Schultz-McCarthy (second round)
15. (United States) Greg Van Emburgh / (United States) Nicole Arendt (first round)
16. (Australia) David Macpherson / (Australia) Rachel McQuillan (first round)

Click on the seed number of a player to go to their draw section.

== Draw ==
Key

- Q = Qualifier
- WC = Wild card
- LL = Lucky loser
- Alt = Alternate
- ITF = ITF entry
- PR = Protected ranking
- SR = Special ranking
- SE = Special exempt
- JE = Junior exempt
- JR = Junior Accelerator Programme entrant
- CO = College Accelerator Programme entrant
- NG = Next Gen Accelerator Program entrant
- w/o = Walkover
- r = Retired
- d = Defaulted

=== Finals ===
Quarterfinals
1 | (Australia) Mark Woodforde (Latvia) Larisa Neiland | 6 | 6
(Australia) Andrew Florent (Australia) Catherine Barclay | 2 | 1
3 | (United States) Jonathan Stark (United States) Martina Navratilova | 7^{7} | 3 | 6
9 | (Australia) Sandon Stolle (United States) Mary Joe Fernández | 6^{4} | 6 | 3
(Netherlands) Tom Nijssen (Germany) Claudia Porwik | 4 | 0
4 | (Czech Republic) Cyril Suk (United States) Gigi Fernández | 6 | 6
WC | (United Kingdom) Mark Petchey (United Kingdom) Clare Wood | 2 | 6^{3}
2 | (Canada) Grant Connell (United States) Lindsay Davenport | 6 | 7^{7}

Semifinals
1 | (Australia) Mark Woodforde (Latvia) Larisa Neiland | 6 | 4 | 4
3 | (United States) Jonathan Stark (United States) Martina Navratilova | 3 | 6 | 6
4 | (Czech Republic) Cyril Suk (United States) Gigi Fernández | 7^{7} | 6
2 | (Canada) Grant Connell (United States) Lindsay Davenport | 6^{4} | 2

Final
3 | (United States) Jonathan Stark (United States) Martina Navratilova | 6 | 6
4 | (Czech Republic) Cyril Suk (United States) Gigi Fernández | 4 | 4

=== Top half ===
==== Section 1 ====
First round
1 | (Australia) M Woodforde (Latvia) L Neiland | 6 | 6
(United States) K Kinnear (Japan) N Miyagi | 1 | 2
(United States) D Randall (Germany) W Probst | 6 | 7^{7}
(Netherlands) HJ Davids (Netherlands) M Oremans | 4 | 6^{4}
(Australia) P Kilderry (United States) R White | 5 | 4
(South Africa) B Haygarth (Germany) C Singer | 7 | 6
(Australia) J Eagle (Australia) K Radford | 6 | 6
15 | (United States) G Van Emburgh (United States) N Arendt | 4 | 4
14 | (United States) M Jensen (Netherlands) B Schultz-McCarthy | 4 | 7^{7} | 7
(Sweden) R Bergh (Australia) R Stubbs | 6 | 6^{5} | 5
(United States) D Johnson (Germany) K Kschwendt | 3 | 3
(United States) K Jones (United States) K Adams | 6 | 6
(Australia) A Florent (Australia) C Barclay | 7 | 7^{7}
(Australia) J Ireland (Slovakia) K Habšudová | 5 | 6^{5}
WC | (United Kingdom) J Bates (United Kingdom) J Durie | 6 | 7^{7}
8 | (Russia) A Olhovskiy (Russia) E Maniokova | 3 | 6^{1}

Second round
1 | (Australia) M Woodforde (Latvia) L Neiland | 7 | 6
(United States) D Randall (Germany) W Probst | 5 | 3
(South Africa) B Haygarth (Germany) C Singer | 7 | 6
(Australia) J Eagle (Australia) K Radford | 5 | 3
14 | (United States) M Jensen (Netherlands) B Schultz-McCarthy | 0^{d}
(United States) K Jones (United States) K Adams | 0
(Australia) A Florent (Australia) C Barclay | 3 | 7 | 11
WC | (United Kingdom) J Bates (United Kingdom) J Durie | 6 | 5 | 9

Third round
1 | (Australia) M Woodforde (Latvia) L Neiland | 6 | 7
(South Africa) B Haygarth (Germany) C Singer | 4 | 5
(United States) K Jones (United States) K Adams | 3 | 5
(Australia) A Florent (Australia) C Barclay | 6 | 7

Quarterfinals
1 | (Australia) M Woodforde (Latvia) L Neiland | 6 | 6
(Australia) A Florent (Australia) C Barclay | 2 | 1

==== Section 2 ====
First round
3 | (United States) J Stark (United States) M Navratilova | 6 | 7^{7}
(United States) M Lucena (United States) T Whitlinger-Jones | 4 | 6^{1}
(Netherlands) S Noteboom (Belgium) E Callens | 7 | 6
(Belgium) L Pimek (Belgium) N Feber | 5 | 3
(South Africa) M Barnard (Netherlands) N Muns-Jagerman | 2 | 5
(South Africa) J-L de Jager (Canada) J Hetherington | 6 | 7
(Australia) M Tebbutt (France) J Halard | 2 | 4
12 | (United States) R Leach (Belarus) N Zvereva | 6 | 6
9 | (Australia) S Stolle (United States) MJ Fernández | 6 | 6
(Sweden) O Kristiansson (Sweden) M Strandlund | 2 | 4
Alt | (United States) K Flach (United States) L Poruri | 2 | 4
(Italy) D Nargiso (Italy) A-M Cecchini | 6 | 6
WC | (United Kingdom) P Hand (United Kingdom) V Lake | 7^{8} | 6^{8} | 6
(Australia) A Kratzmann (United States) D Scott | 6^{6} | 7^{10} | 3
(United States) B MacPhie (United States) L Harvey-Wild | 6 | 4 | 6
6 | (South Africa) L Bale (United States) M McGrath | 2 | 6 | 3

Second round
3 | (United States) J Stark (United States) M Navratilova | 6 | 7
(Netherlands) S Noteboom (Belgium) E Callens | 4 | 5
(South Africa) J-L de Jager (Canada) J Hetherington | 2 | 6^{5}
12 | (United States) R Leach (Belarus) N Zvereva | 6 | 7^{7}
9 | (Australia) S Stolle (United States) MJ Fernández | 6 | 7^{7}
(Italy) D Nargiso (Italy) A-C Cecchini | 3 | 6^{3}
WC | (United Kingdom) P Hand (United Kingdom) V Lake | 4 | 5
(United States) B MacPhie (United States) L Harvey-Wild | 6 | 7

Third round
3 | (United States) J Stark (United States) M Navratilova | 6 | 6
12 | (United States) R Leach (Belarus) N Zvereva | 3 | 3
9 | (Australia) S Stolle (United States) MJ Fernández | 6 | 7^{7}
(United States) B MacPhie (United States) L Harvey-Wild | 4 | 6^{4}

Quarterfinals
3 | (United States) J Stark (United States) M Navratilova | 7^{7} | 3 | 6
9 | (Australia) S Stolle (United States) MJ Fernández | 6^{4} | 6 | 3

=== Bottom half ===
==== Section 3 ====
First round
7 | (United States) P Galbraith (South Africa) E Reinach | 3 | 4
(South Africa) D Visser (Romania) I Spîrlea | 6 | 6
(Netherlands) T Nijssen (Germany) C Porwik | 6 | 7
(South Africa) P Norval (France) S Amiach | 3 | 5
(South Africa) E Ferreira (Canada) P Hy-Boulais | 3 | 4
(Argentina) P Albano (Argentina) M Paz | 6 | 6
(Australia) W Arthurs (Australia) K-A Guse | 6 | 4 | 6
11 | (Australia) J Fitzgerald (Netherlands) M Bollegraf | 4 | 6 | 3
16 | (Australia) D Macpherson (Australia) R McQuillan | 6^{5} | 4
(Belgium) D Norman (Belgium) S Appelmans | 7^{7} | 6
(United States) L Jensen (United States) R Jensen | 6 | 6
(United States) J Waite (United States) S Stafford | 3 | 4
WC | (United Kingdom) D Sapsford (United Kingdom) S-A Siddall | 6 | 1 | 1^{r}
(Mexico) L Lavalle (Belgium) D Monami | 2 | 6 | 1
(United States) K Thorne (Indonesia) Y Basuki | 3 | 5
4 | (Czech Republic) C Suk (United States) G Fernández | 6 | 7

Second round
(South Africa) D Visser (Romania) I Spîrlea | 3 | 7^{7} | 8
(Netherlands) T Nijssen (Germany) C Porwik | 6 | 6^{2} | 6
(Argentina) P Albano (Argentina) M Paz | 6 | 6
(Australia) W Arthurs (Australia) K-A Guse | 4 | 4
(Belgium) D Norman (Belgium) S Appelmans | 5 | 6 | 6
(United States) L Jensen (United States) R Jensen | 7 | 3 | 4
(Mexico) L Lavalle (Belgium) D Monami | 1 | 4
4 | (Czech Republic) C Suk (United States) G Fernández | 6 | 6

Third round
(Netherlands) T Nijssen (Germany) C Porwik | 7^{11} | 6
(Argentina) P Albano (Argentina) M Paz | 6^{9} | 2
(Belgium) D Norman (Belgium) S Appelmans | 4 | 3
4 | (Czech Republic) C Suk (United States) G Fernández | 6 | 6

Quarterfinals
(Netherlands) T Nijssen (Germany) C Porwik | 4 | 0
4 | (Czech Republic) C Suk (United States) G Fernández | 6 | 6

==== Section 4 ====
First round
5 | (South Africa) D Adams (United States) L Raymond | 4 | 3
(United States) TJ Middleton (United States) L McNeil | 6 | 6
(Australia) T Woodbridge (Czech Republic) H Suková | 6 | 6^{6} | 6
(United States) M Bauer (United States) P Fendick | 3 | 7^{8} | 1
WC | (United Kingdom) C Wilkinson (United Kingdom) A Wainwright | 4 | 6^{1}
WC | (United Kingdom) M Petchey (United Kingdom) C Wood | 6 | 7^{7}
(Netherlands) T Kempers (Netherlands) C Vis | 4 | 4
13 | (Netherlands) M Oosting (Netherlands) K Boogert | 6 | 6
10 | (New Zealand) B Steven (Australia) N Bradtke | 7 | 6
(Sweden) L-A Wahlgren (Sweden) M Lindström | 5 | 3
Alt | (South Africa) M Ondruska (Australia) L Pleming | 6 | 5 | 2
(Argentina) J Frana (Argentina) P Tarabini | 1 | 7 | 6
(Italy) C Brandi (Italy) L Golarsa | 5 | 3
(United States) S Davis (United States) D Graham | 7 | 6
(United Kingdom) N Broad (Canada) R Simpson | 2 | 4
2 | (Canada) G Connell (United States) L Davenport | 6 | 6

Second round
(United States) TJ Middleton (United States) L McNeil | 6 | 7^{7}
(Australia) T Woodbridge (Czech Republic) H Suková | 3 | 6^{4}
WC | (United Kingdom) M Petchey (United Kingdom) C Wood | 4 | 6 | 6
13 | (Netherlands) M Oosting (Netherlands) K Boogert | 6 | 2 | 2
10 | (New Zealand) B Steven (Australia) N Bradtke | 7^{7} | 7
(Argentina) J Frana (Argentina) P Tarabini | 6^{2} | 5
(United States) S Davis (United States) D Graham | 6 | 3 | 5
2 | (Canada) G Connell (United States) L Davenport | 4 | 6 | 7

Third round
(United States) TJ Middleton (United States) L McNeil | 4 | 5
WC | (United Kingdom) M Petchey (United Kingdom) C Wood | 6 | 7
10 | (New Zealand) B Steven (Australia) N Bradtke | 7 | 4 | 3
2 | (Canada) G Connell (United States) L Davenport | 5 | 6 | 6

Quarterfinals
WC | (United Kingdom) M Petchey (United Kingdom) C Wood | 2 | 6^{3}
2 | (Canada) G Connell (United States) L Davenport | 6 | 7^{7}
