= 1995 French Open =

- Date: 29 May – 11 June 1995
- Edition: 94
- Category: 65th Grand Slam (ITF)
- Surface: Clay
- Location: Paris (XVI^{e}), France
- Venue: Stade Roland Garros

Champions

Men's singles
- (Austria) Thomas Muster

Women's singles
- (Germany) Steffi Graf

Men's doubles
- (Netherlands) Jacco Eltingh / (Netherlands) Paul Haarhuis

Women's doubles
- (United States) Gigi Fernández / (Belarus) Natalia Zvereva

Mixed doubles
- (Latvia) Larisa Savchenko-Neiland / (Australia) Todd Woodbridge
← 1994 ·	French Open	· 1996 →

The 1995 French Open was a tennis tournament that took place on the outdoor clay courts at the Stade Roland Garros in Paris, France. The tournament was held from 29 May until 11 June. It was the 94th staging of the French Open, and the second Grand Slam tennis event of 1995.

== Seniors ==
=== Men's singles ===
(Austria) Thomas Muster defeated (United States) Michael Chang, 7–5, 6–2, 6–4.

- It was Muster's sixth title of the year, and his 29th overall. It was his first career Grand Slam title.

=== Women's singles ===
(Germany) Steffi Graf defeated (Spain) Arantxa Sánchez, 7–5, 4–6, 6–0.

- It was Graf's fifth title of the year, and her 91st overall. It was her 16th career Grand Slam title, and her fourth French Open title.

=== Men's doubles ===
(Netherlands) Jacco Eltingh / (Netherlands) Paul Haarhuis defeated (Sweden) Nicklas Kulti / (Sweden) Magnus Larsson, 6–7^{(3–7)}, 6–4, 6–1.

=== Women's doubles ===
(United States) Gigi Fernández / (Belarus) Natasha Zvereva defeated (Czech Republic) Jana Novotná / (Spain) Arantxa Sánchez, 6–7^{(6–8)}, 6–4, 7–5.

=== Mixed doubles ===
(Latvia) Larisa Savchenko-Neiland / (Australia) Mark Woodforde defeated (Canada) Jill Hetherington / (South Africa) John-Laffnie de Jager, 7–6^{(10–8)}, 7–6^{(7–4)}.

== Juniors ==
=== Boys' singles ===
(Argentina) Mariano Zabaleta defeated (Argentina) Mariano Puerta 6–0, 6–0

=== Girls' singles ===
(France) Amélie Cocheteux defeated (Germany) Marlene Weingärtner, 7–5, 6–4

=== Boys' doubles ===
(Netherlands) Raemon Sluiter / (Netherlands) Peter Wessels defeated (United States) Justin Gimelstob / (United States) Ryan Wolters, 7–6, 7–5

=== Girls' doubles ===
(United States) Corina Morariu / (Czech Republic) Ludmila Varmužová defeated (Italy) Alice Canepa / (Italy) Giulia Casoni, 7–6, 7–5

Preceded by 1995 Australian Open	Grand Slams	Succeeded by 1995 Wimbledon Championships
