= 1995 Wimbledon Championships =

- Date: 26 June – 9 July
- Edition: 109th
- Category: Grand Slam (ITF)
- Draw: 128S/64D/64XD
- Prize money: £6,025,550
- Surface: Grass
- Location: Church Road; SW19, Wimbledon, London, United Kingdom
- Venue: All England Lawn Tennis and Croquet Club

Champions

Men's singles
- (United States) Pete Sampras

Women's singles
- (Germany) Steffi Graf

Men's doubles
- (Australia) Todd Woodbridge / (Australia) Mark Woodforde

Women's doubles
- (Czech Republic) Jana Novotná / (Spain) Arantxa Sánchez Vicario

Mixed doubles
- (United States) Jonathan Stark / (United States) Martina Navratilova

Boys' singles
- (France) Olivier Mutis

Girls' singles
- (Poland) Aleksandra Olsza

Boys' doubles
- (United Kingdom) Martin Lee / (United Kingdom) James Trotman

Girls' doubles
- (Zimbabwe) Cara Black / (Poland) Aleksandra Olsza
← 1994 ·	Wimbledon Championships	· 1996 →

The 1995 Wimbledon Championships was a tennis tournament played on grass courts at the All England Lawn Tennis and Croquet Club in Wimbledon, London in the United Kingdom. It was the 109th edition of the Wimbledon Championships and were held from 26 June to 9 July 1995.

== Prize money ==
The total prize money for 1995 championships was £6,025,550. The winner of the men's title earned £365,000 while the women's singles champion earned £328,000.

Event	W	F	SF	QF	Round of 16	Round of 32	Round of 64	Round of 128
Men's singles	£365,000							
Women's singles	£328,000	£164,000	£78,000	£40,200	£21,160	£11,430	£6,930	£4,250
Men's doubles *	£149,540							—
Women's doubles *	£129,300	£64,650	£30,700	£16,000	£7,950	£4,320	£2,450	—
Mixed doubles *	£63,500	£31,750	£15,875	£7,300	£3,650	£1,820	£830	—

_{* per team}

== Champions ==
=== Seniors ===
==== Men's singles ====
(United States) Pete Sampras defeated (Germany) Boris Becker, 6–7 ^{(5–7)}, 6–2, 6–4, 6–2

- It was Sampras' 6th career Grand Slam title and his 3rd consecutive Wimbledon title.

==== Women's singles ====
(Germany) Steffi Graf defeated (Spain) Arantxa Sánchez Vicario, 4–6, 6–1, 7–5

- It was Graf's 18th career Grand Slam title and her 6th Wimbledon title.

==== Men's doubles ====
(Australia) Todd Woodbridge / (Australia) Mark Woodforde defeated (United States) Rick Leach / (United States) Scott Melville, 7–5, 7–6 ^{(10–8)}, 7–6 ^{(7–5)}

- It was Woodbridge's 8th career Grand Slam title and his 4th Wimbledon title. It was Woodforde's 8th career Grand Slam title and his 3rd Wimbledon title.

==== Women's doubles ====
(Czech Republic) Jana Novotná / (Spain) Arantxa Sánchez Vicario defeated (United States) Gigi Fernández / (Belarus) Natasha Zvereva, 5–7, 7–5, 6–4

- It was Novotná's 12th career Grand Slam title and her 4th Wimbledon title. It was Sánchez Vicario's 11th career Grand Slam title and her only Wimbledon title.

==== Mixed doubles ====
(United States) Jonathan Stark / (United States) Martina Navratilova defeated (Czech Republic) Cyril Suk / (United States) Gigi Fernández, 6–4, 6–4

- It was Navratilova's 56th career Grand Slam title and her 19th Wimbledon title. It was Stark's 2nd and last career Grand Slam title and his only Wimbledon title.

=== Juniors ===
==== Boys' singles ====
(France) Olivier Mutis defeated (Germany) Nicolas Kiefer, 6–2, 6–2

==== Girls' singles ====
(Poland) Aleksandra Olsza defeated (Thailand) Tamarine Tanasugarn, 7–5, 7–6^{(8–6)}

==== Boys' doubles ====
(United Kingdom) Martin Lee / (United Kingdom) James Trotman defeated (Mexico) Alejandro Hernández / (Argentina) Mariano Puerta, 7–6^{(7–2)}, 6–4

==== Girls' doubles ====
(Zimbabwe) Cara Black / (Poland) Aleksandra Olsza defeated (Australia) Trudi Musgrave / (Australia) Jodi Richardson, 6–0, 7–6^{(7–5)}

== Singles seeds ==
=== Men's singles ===
1. (United States) Andre Agassi (semifinals, lost to Boris Becker)
2. (United States) Pete Sampras (champion)
3. (Germany) Boris Becker (final, lost to Pete Sampras)
4. (Croatia) Goran Ivanišević (semifinals, lost to Pete Sampras)
5. (United States) Michael Chang (second round, lost to Petr Korda)
6. (Russia) Yevgeny Kafelnikov (quarterfinals, lost to Goran Ivanišević)
7. (South Africa) Wayne Ferreira (fourth round, lost to Jacco Eltingh)
8. (Spain) Sergi Bruguera (withdrew before the tournament began)
9. (Germany) Michael Stich (first round, lost to Jacco Eltingh)
10. (Switzerland) Marc Rosset (first round, lost to Michael Joyce)
11. (United States) Jim Courier (second round, lost to Cédric Pioline)
12. (Netherlands) Richard Krajicek (first round, lost to Bryan Shelton)
13. (Sweden) Stefan Edberg (second round, lost to Dick Norman)
14. (United States) Todd Martin (fourth round, lost to Goran Ivanišević)
15. (Ukraine) Andriy Medvedev (second round, lost to Jeff Tarango)
16. (France) Guy Forget (second round, lost to Greg Rusedski)

=== Women's singles ===
1. (Germany) Steffi Graf (champion)
2. (Spain) Arantxa Sánchez Vicario (final, lost to Steffi Graf)
3. (Spain) Conchita Martínez (semifinals, lost to Arantxa Sánchez Vicario)
4. (Czech Republic) Jana Novotná (semifinals, lost to Steffi Graf)
5. (France) Mary Pierce (second round, lost to Nathalie Tauziat)
6. (Japan) Kimiko Date (quarterfinals, lost to Jana Novotná)
7. (United States) Lindsay Davenport (fourth round, lost to Mary Joe Fernández)
8. (Argentina) Gabriela Sabatini (quarterfinals, lost to Conchita Martínez)
9. (Germany) Anke Huber (fourth round, lost to Arantxa Sánchez Vicario)
10. (Belarus) Natasha Zvereva (third round, lost to Inés Gorrochategui)
11. (Croatia) Iva Majoli (first round, lost to Angélica Gavaldón)
12. (United States) Amy Frazier (second round, lost to Irina Spîrlea)
13. (United States) Mary Joe Fernández (quarterfinals, lost to Steffi Graf)
14. (Japan) Naoko Sawamatsu (third round, lost to Petra Kamstra)
15. (Netherlands) Brenda Schultz-McCarthy (quarterfinals, lost to Arantxa Sánchez Vicario)
16. (Czech Republic) Helena Suková (second round, lost to Yone Kamio)

Preceded by 1995 French Open	Grand Slams	Succeeded by 1995 U.S. Open
