= Martin Lee (tennis) =

English tennis player

- Country (sports): United Kingdom
- Residence: Marlow, England
- Born: 13 January 1978 (age 47); London, England
- Height: 1.80 m (5 ft 11 in)
- Turned pro: 1996
- Retired: 2006
- Plays: Left-handed (two-handed backhand)
- Coach: David Sammel
- Prize money: $561,085

Singles
- Career record: 21–46
- Career titles: 0
- Highest ranking: No. 94 (11 March 2002)

Grand Slam singles results
- Australian Open: 1R (2002)
- French Open: 1R (2002)
- Wimbledon: 2R (1997, 2000, 2001, 2006)
- US Open: 1R (2001)

Doubles
- Career record: 6–19
- Career titles: 0
- Highest ranking: No. 145 (30 October 2006)

Grand Slam doubles results
- Wimbledon: 2R (2003, 2004)

Grand Slam mixed doubles results
- Wimbledon: 1R (2003)
- Last updated on: 17 October 2021.

Martin Lee (born 13 January 1978) is an English former professional tennis player. Born in London, he resides in Marlow, Buckinghamshire.

== Tennis career ==
Lee was a promising junior, reaching No. 1 in the world junior rankings. In 1995 he won the Boys Doubles at Wimbledon. A left-hander, he turned pro in 1996. He struggled with constant knee and groin problems throughout his career, which eventually forced his retirement from the professional circuit in November 2006.

Lee's best singles result on the ATP Tour was to reach the final of the Hall of Fame Championships in Newport, Rhode Island in 2001. On 11 March 2002, Lee achieved his career-high singles ranking of World No. 94, establishing himself as the British number three behind Tim Henman and Greg Rusedski. It was the first time in 23 years that Britain had three players in the Top 100. However, in November 2002 he underwent knee surgery and was out of action for 10 months, and his ranking never recovered.

Lee reached the second round of the men's singles at Wimbledon four times, in 1997, 2000, 2001 and 2006. He appeared in the US Open in 2001, and managed to take two sets off of seeded player Sjeng Schalken, however the Dutchman prevailed 6–3 in the deciding set. Lee's ranking also ensured automatic qualification for the main draw of the Australian and French Opens in 2002, but he lost in the first round on both occasions. Overall he won 21 and lost 46 ATP Tour matches.

Lee won two of his three matches for Great Britain in the Davis Cup, however these were only dead rubbers. Lee lost his only live match against Thailand's Paradorn Srichaphan in straight sets.

== ATP career finals ==
=== Singles: 1 (1 runner-up) ===
Legend Grand Slam tournaments (0–0) ATP World Tour Finals (0–0) ATP World Tour Masters Series (0–0) ATP World Tour Championship Series (0–0) ATP World Tour World Series (0–1)	Titles by surface Hard (0–0) Clay (0–0) Grass (0–1) Carpet (0–0)	Titles by setting Outdoor (0–1) Indoor (0–0)

Result	W–L	Date	Tournament	Tier	Surface	Opponent	Score
Loss	0–1	Jul 2001	Newport, United States	International Series	Grass	(South Africa) Neville Godwin	1–6, 4–6

== ATP Challenger and ITF Futures finals ==
=== Singles: 6 (2–4) ===
Legend ATP Challenger (0–3) ITF Futures (2–1)	Finals by surface Hard (2–3) Clay (0–0) Grass (0–1) Carpet (0–0)

Result	W–L	Date	Tournament	Tier	Surface	Opponent	Score
Win	1–0	Sep 1998	Great Britain F7, Sunderland	Futures	Hard	(United Kingdom) Ross Matheson	4–6, 7–5, 6–4
Loss	1–1	Jul 2000	Manchester, United Kingdom	Challenger	Grass	(Italy) Mosé Navarra	4–6, 3–6
Loss	1–2	Aug 2000	Gramado, Brazil	Challenger	Hard	(Brazil) Alexandre Simoni	4–6, 5–7
Loss	1–3	Mar 2001	Hamilton, New Zealand	Challenger	Hard	(Sweden) Bjorn Rehnquist	6–3, 2–6, 0–6
Loss	1–4	Sep 2005	Great Britain F12, Glasgow	Futures	Hard	(United Kingdom) Matthew Smith	4–6, 6–3, 1–6
Win	2–4	Mar 2006	Great Britain F3, Sunderland	Futures	Hard	(United Kingdom) James Auckland	6–7^{(5–7)}, 6–1, 6–2

=== Doubles: 15 (5–10) ===
Legend ATP Challenger (4–5) ITF Futures (1–5)	Finals by surface Hard (2–5) Clay (0–2) Grass (3–2) Carpet (0–1)

Result	W–L	Date	Tournament	Tier	Surface	Partner	Opponents	Score
Loss	0–1	Sep 1998	Great Britain F7, Sunderland	Futures	Hard	(United Kingdom) Jamie Delgado	(United Kingdom) Ross Matheson (United Kingdom) Tom Spinks	3–6, 4–6
Loss	0–2	May 1999	Great Britain F7, Edinburgh	Futures	Clay	(United Kingdom) Arvind Parmar	(Australia) Ben Ellwood (United Kingdom) Miles MacLagan	2–6, 3–6
Loss	0–3	Jul 1999	Manchester, United Kingdom	Challenger	Grass	(United Kingdom) Jamie Delgado	(South Africa) Jeff Coetzee (South Africa) Neville Godwin	4–6, 2–6
Loss	0–4	Aug 1999	Belo Horizonte, Brazil	Challenger	Hard	(United Kingdom) Jamie Delgado	(Brazil) Daniel Melo (Brazil) Antonio Prieto	2–6, 6–3, 5–7
Loss	0–5	Dec 1999	Lucknow, United Kingdom	Challenger	Grass	(United Kingdom) Jamie Delgado	(Denmark) Kristian Pless (Thailand) Paradorn Srichaphan	7–5, 3–6, 5–7
Loss	0–6	Apr 2000	Great Britain F3, London	Futures	Clay	(United Kingdom) Oliver Freelove	(United Kingdom) James Davidson (Finland) Ville Liukko	5–7, 2–6
Loss	0–7	Aug 2000	Belo Horizonte, Brazil	Challenger	Hard	(United Kingdom) Jamie Delgado	(Brazil) Daniel Melo (Brazil) Alexandre Simoni	4–6, 4–6
Loss	0–8	Feb 2001	Hull, United Kingdom	Challenger	Carpet	(United Kingdom) Barry Cowan	(Germany) Michael Kohlmann (France) Michael Llodra	2–6, 3–6
Win	1–8	Jul 2003	Manchester, United Kingdom	Challenger	Grass	(United Kingdom) Arvind Parmar	(United Kingdom) Daniel Kiernan (United Kingdom) David Sherwood	6–3, 2–6, 6–2
Win	2–8	Apr 2005	Great Britain F6, Bath	Futures	Hard	(United Kingdom) Ross Hutchins	(United Kingdom) Lee Childs (Germany) Alexander Flock	7–6^{(7–4)}, 6–3
Win	3–8	Jul 2005	Nottingham, United Kingdom	Challenger	Grass	(United Kingdom) Josh Goodall	(France) Jean-Michel Pequery (Pakistan) Aisam Qureshi	6–4, 7–6^{(7–0)}
Loss	3–9	Sep 2005	Great Britain F11, Nottingham	Futures	Hard	(United Kingdom) Lee Childs	(Norway) Frederick Sundsten (France) Olivier Charroin	3–6, 6–3, 3–6
Loss	3–10	Mar 2006	Great Britain F4, Manchester	Futures	Hard	(United Kingdom) David Sherwood	(France) Jean-Francois Bachelot (Pakistan) Aisam Qureshi	1–6, 6–3, 2–6
Win	4–10	Jul 2006	Nottingham, United Kingdom	Challenger	Grass	(United Kingdom) Jonathan Marray	(United Kingdom) Josh Goodall (United Kingdom) Ross Hutchins	3–6, 6–3, [10–3]
Win	5–10	Aug 2006	Bronx, United States	Challenger	Hard	(Israel) Harel Levy	(United States) Scott Lipsky (United States) David Martin	6–4, 7–5

== Performance timeline ==
Key
W	F	SF	QF	#R	RR	Q#	DNQ	A	NH

(W) winner; (F) finalist; (SF) semifinalist; (QF) quarterfinalist; (#R) rounds 4, 3, 2, 1; (RR) round-robin stage; (Q#) qualification round; (DNQ) did not qualify; (A) absent; (NH) not held; (SR) strike rate (events won / competed); (W–L) win–loss record.

=== Singles ===
Tournament	1995	1996	1997	1998	1999	2000	2001	2002	2003	2004	2005	2006	SR	W–L	Win %
Grand Slam tournaments
Australian Open	A	A	A	A	A	A	Q2	1R	A	A	A	A	0 / 1	0–1	0%
French Open	A	A	A	Q1	A	A	Q2	1R	A	A	A	A	0 / 1	0–1	0%
Wimbledon	Q2	Q1	2R	1R	1R	2R	2R	1R	1R	A	A	2R	0 / 8	4–8	33%
US Open	A	A	A	A	Q1	Q3	1R	Q2	Q2	A	A	Q1	0 / 1	0–1	0%
Win–loss	0–0	0–0	1–1	0–1	0–1	1–1	1–2	0–3	0–1	0–0	0–0	1–1	0 / 11	4–11	27%
ATP Tour Masters 1000
Miami Open	A	A	A	A	A	A	A	1R	A	A	A	A	0 / 1	0–1	0%
Canadian Open	A	A	A	A	A	A	1R	A	A	A	A	A	0 / 1	0–1	0%
Cincinnati Masters	A	A	A	A	A	A	Q1	A	A	A	A	A	0 / 0	0–0	–
Win–loss	0–0	0–0	0–0	0–0	0–0	0–0	0–1	0–1	0–0	0–0	0–0	0–0	0 / 2	0–2	0%

== Junior Grand Slam finals ==
=== Doubles: 2 (1 title, 1 runner-up) ===
Result	Year	Tournament	Surface	Partnet	Opponents	Score
Win	1995	Wimbledon	Grass	(United Kingdom) James Trotman	(Mexico) Alejandro Hernandez (Argentina) Mariano Puerta	7–6, 6–4
Loss	1996	Australian Open	Hard	(United Kingdom) James Trotman	(Canada) Jocelyn Robichaud (Italy) Daniele Bracciali	2–6, 4–6
