= James Trotman =

British tennis player (born 1979)

- Full name: James Trotman
- Country (sports): (United Kingdom) Great Britain
- Born: 16 February 1979 (age 47) Ipswich, England
- Plays: Right-handed
- Prize money: $4,563

Doubles
- Career record: 0–1
- Career titles: 0
- Highest ranking: No. 810 (3 May 1999)
- Last updated on: 13 June 2025.

James Trotman (born 16 February 1979) is a British tennis coach, former professional player, and a junior Grand Slam champion in boys' doubles at both the Wimbledon Championships and the Australian Open. He is known for his success in junior Grand Slam doubles and his work with top British talent.

Since 2021, he has served as coach to British men’s singles No. 1 Jack Draper.

== Career ==
Trotman was born in Ipswich in 1979 and originally played for Sproughton Tennis Club.

As a junior he won the 1995 Wimbledon Championships boys doubles with Martin Lee and 1997 Australian Open boys doubles with David Sherwood. He and Lee also made one main draw appearance in the Men's Wimbledon doubles championship, in 1997. They lost in the first round to Henrik Holm and Nils Holm, 4–6, 6–3, 3–6.

Persistent injuries prevented him from continuing at a senior professional level.

== Coaching ==
After he retired as a player Trotman moved into coaching. Players he has worked with include Anne Keothavong, Kyle Edmund, Naomi Cavaday, Cameron Norrie and Jack Draper. Edmund won the Levene Gouldin & Thompson Tennis Challenger, the Hong Kong ATP Challenger and qualifiers to gain entrance into two Grand Slams under Trotman. He coached Cameron Norrie from 2017, with Norrie reaching a major semifinal, in Wimbledon in 2022, and holding the position of British No. 1 in men's singles from October 2021 to June 2024.

Since 2021 Trotman has coached British tennis player Jack Draper at the National Tennis Centre in Roehampton as part of the LTA's Elite Players support programme. Under Trotman, Draper achieved a career-high ATP singles ranking of world No. 4, on 9 June 2025, has won three titles on the ATP Tour, including an ATP 1000 event at the 2025 Indian Wells Open, and reached a major Grand Slam semifinal at the 2024 US Open (tennis).

== Junior Grand Slam finals ==
=== Doubles: 3 (2 titles, 1 runner-up) ===
Result	Year	Tournament	Surface	Partner	Opponents	Score
Win	1995	Wimbledon	Grass	(United Kingdom) Martin Lee	(Mexico) Alejandro Hernandez (Argentina) Mariano Puerta	7–6, 6–4
Loss	1996	Australian Open	Hard	(United Kingdom) Martin Lee	(Canada) Jocelyn Robichaud (Italy) Daniele Bracciali	2–6, 4–6
Win	1997	Australian Open	Hard	(United Kingdom) David Sherwood	(South Africa) Jaco Van Der Westhuizen (South Africa) Wesley Whitehouse	7–6, 6–3
