= Olivier Mutis =

French tennis player

- Country (sports): France
- Residence: Luxembourg, Luxembourg
- Born: 2 February 1978 (age 47); Mont-Saint-Martin, France
- Height: 175 cm (5 ft 9 in)
- Turned pro: 1996
- Retired: 2006
- Plays: Right-handed (two-handed backhand)
- Prize money: $605,413

Singles
- Career record: 24–41 (at ATP Tour level, Grand Slam level, and in Davis Cup)
- Career titles: 0
- Highest ranking: No. 71 (28 July 2003)

Grand Slam singles results
- Australian Open: 1R (2004, 2005)
- French Open: 4R (2004)
- Wimbledon: 2R (2003)
- US Open: 1R (2003, 2004

Doubles
- Career record: 1–12 (at ATP Tour level and Grand Slam level, and in Davis Cup)
- Career titles: 0
- Highest ranking: No. 632 (1 November 2004)

Grand Slam doubles results
- French Open: 1R (1996, 1997, 1999, 2000, 2004, 2005)

Grand Slam mixed doubles results
- French Open: 1R (1996)
- Last updated on: 5 January 2022.

Olivier Mutis (French pronunciation: [ɔlivje mytis]; born 2 February 1978) is a former French professional tennis player who retired in 2006. He did not win any ATP Tour titles but he won a total of 7 ATP Challenger Series.

His best performance in a Grand Slam was at Roland Garros in 2004, when he reached the fourth round after having defeated World No. 2 Andy Roddick in a second round match. He played his first match in over a year in the Metz International qualifying 2008. He lost to Thierry Ascione 5–7, 6–2, 5–7 in a close match.

He was the only player in history to have won every set he has played against Rafael Nadal on clay until Hubert Hurkacz replicated the feat in 2024.

== Junior Grand Slam finals ==
=== Singles: 1 (1 title) ===
Result	Year	Tournament	Surface	Opponent	Score
Win	1995	Wimbledon	Grass	(Germany) Nicolas Kiefer	6–2, 6–2

=== Doubles: 1 (1 title) ===
Result	Year	Tournament	Surface	Partner	Opponents	Score
Win	1996	French Open	Clay	(France) Sebastien Grosjean	(Germany) Jan-Ralph Brandt (Germany) Daniel Elsner	6–2, 6–3

== ATP Challenger and ITF Futures finals ==
=== Singles: 16 (12–4) ===
Legend ATP Challenger (7–3) ITF Futures (5–1)	Finals by surface Hard (2–0) Clay (10–2) Grass (0–0) Carpet (0–2)

Result	W–L	Date	Tournament	Tier	Surface	Opponent	Score
Win	1–0	Jul 1997	Montauban, France	Challenger	Clay	(Austria) Horst Skoff	6–3, 7–6
Loss	1–1	Apr 2000	France F9, Clermont-Ferrand	Futures	Carpet	(Germany) Daniel Elsner	3–6, 4–6
Win	2–1	Apr 2000	Great Britain F3, Edinburgh	Futures	Clay	(Germany) Jan Weinzierl	6–4, 6–3
Win	3–1	May 2000	Great Britain F4, Hatfield	Futures	Clay	(France) Olivier Patience	6–1, 6–4
Win	4–1	May 2000	Great Britain F5, Newcastle	Futures	Clay	(Greece) Vasilis Mazarakis	7–5, 6–2
Loss	4–2	Jul 2000	Tampere, Finland	Challenger	Clay	(Belgium) Johan Van Herck	3–6, 2–6
Loss	4–3	Oct 2000	Eckental, Germany	Challenger	Carpet	(Germany) Jens Knippschild	7–6^{(7–5)}, 6–7^{(4–7)}, 5–7
Win	5–3	May 2002	Germany F2, Esslingen	Futures	Clay	(Croatia) Ivan Vajda	6–1, 6–3
Win	6–3	May 2002	Great Britain F4, Hatfield	Futures	Clay	(France) Jean-Christophe Faurel	6–4, 6–2
Loss	6–4	Jun 2002	Eisenach, Germany	Challenger	Clay	(Czech Republic) Tomas Zib	6–7^{(5–7)}, 2–6
Win	7–4	Aug 2002	Segovia, Spain	Challenger	Hard	(Spain) Fernando Verdasco	6–4, 6–2
Win	8–4	Aug 2002	Graz, Austria	Challenger	Hard	(Italy) Filippo Volandri	6–3, 6–2
Win	9–4	Sep 2002	Aschaffenburg, Germany	Challenger	Clay	(Italy) Potito Starace	6–4, 6–0
Win	10–4	Oct 2002	Seville, Spain	Challenger	Clay	(Spain) Albert Portas	6–3, 7–5
Win	11–4	Mar 2004	Saint Brieuc, France	Challenger	Clay	(Belgium) Christophe Rochus	6–1, 4–6, 6–2
Win	12–4	Jun 2004	Reggio Emilia, Italy	Challenger	Clay	(Germany) Philipp Kohlschreiber	6–2, 0–6, 6–3

=== Doubles: 1 (0–1) ===
Legend ATP Challenger (0–0) ITF Futures (0–1)	Finals by surface Hard (0–0) Clay (0–1) Grass (0–0) Carpet (0–0)

Result	W–L	Date	Tournament	Tier	Surface	Partner	Opponents	Score
Loss	0–1	May 1999	Great Britain F5, Hatfield	Futures	Clay	(France) Sebastien de Chaunac	(United Kingdom) Simon Dickson (United Kingdom) Danny Sapsford	5–7, 0–6

== Performance timeline ==
Key
W	F	SF	QF	#R	RR	Q#	DNQ	A	NH

(W) winner; (F) finalist; (SF) semifinalist; (QF) quarterfinalist; (#R) rounds 4, 3, 2, 1; (RR) round-robin stage; (Q#) qualification round; (DNQ) did not qualify; (A) absent; (NH) not held; (SR) strike rate (events won / competed); (W–L) win–loss record.

=== Singles ===
Tournament	1995	1996	1997	1998	1999	2000	2001	2002	2003	2004	2005	SR	W–L	Win %
Grand Slam tournaments
Australian Open	A	A	A	A	A	A	A	A	A	1R	1R	0 / 2	0–2	0%
French Open	1R	A	Q3	1R	Q3	A	Q1	Q2	2R	4R	Q1	0 / 4	4–4	50%
Wimbledon	A	A	A	A	A	Q1	Q1	A	2R	Q2	A	0 / 1	1–1	50%
US Open	A	A	Q1	A	Q2	A	A	A	1R	1R	A	0 / 2	0–2	0%
Win–loss	0–1	0–0	0–0	0–1	0–0	0–0	0–0	0–0	2–3	3–3	0–1	0 / 9	5–9	36%
ATP Masters Series
Monte Carlo	A	A	A	A	A	A	A	A	A	A	Q1	0 / 0	0–0	–
Hamburg	A	A	A	A	A	A	A	A	1R	A	A	0 / 1	0–1	0%
Rome	A	A	A	A	A	A	A	A	A	Q2	A	0 / 0	0–0	–
Paris	A	Q1	Q1	A	A	A	A	A	A	Q1	A	0 / 0	0–0	–
Win–loss	0–0	0–0	0–0	0–0	0–0	0–0	0–0	0–0	0–1	0–0	0–0	0 / 1	0–1	0%
