= Ryan Wolters =

American tennis player

- Country (sports): United States
- Born: February 1, 1977 (age 48); San Jose, California, U.S.
- Height: 5 ft 11 in (180 cm)
- Plays: Right-handed
- Prize money: $20,229

Singles
- Career record: 0–2
- Highest ranking: No. 572 (Sep 11, 2000)

Grand Slam singles results
- US Open: Q1 (1996)

Doubles
- Career record: 0–2
- Highest ranking: No. 426 (Mar 5, 2001)

Grand Slam doubles results
- US Open: 1R (1999)

Ryan Wolters (born February 1, 1977) is an American former professional tennis player.

Wolters, the son of a nuclear engineer, was born and raised in San Jose, California.

In junior tennis, Wolters was ranked as high as four in the world for doubles by the ITF and finished runner-up in the boys' doubles at the 1995 French Open, partnering Justin Gimelstob. He was a Junior Davis Cup representative for the United States and helped his nation to win the Sunshine Cup title in 1995.

Wolters played four years of collegiate tennis for Stanford University during the late 1990s, earning All-American honors each season. In 1995 he became the first qualifier to win the ITA All-American Championships. As a senior in 1999 he partnered with K.J. Hippensteel to claim the NCAA Division I doubles championship. He also won three NCAA Division I team championships, two of them while playing beside the Bryan brothers.

On the professional tour, Wolters made two ATP Tour main draw appearances at the Pacific Coast Championships in San Jose, including in 1996 when he lost in the first round to Andre Agassi. He featured in the men's doubles main draw of the 1999 US Open, with Stanford teammate K. J. Hippensteel.

== Junior Grand Slam finals ==
=== Doubles: 1 (1 runner-up) ===
Result	Year	Championship	Surface	Partner	Opponent	Score
Loss	1995	French Open	Clay	(United States) Justin Gimelstob	(Netherlands) Raemon Sluiter (Netherlands) Peter Wessels	6–7, 5–7
