= 1995 Wimbledon Championships – Men's singles qualifying =

Men's singles qualifying
- 1995 Wimbledon Championships

Events
Singles	men	women		boys	girls
Doubles	men	women	mixed	boys	girls
WC Singles	men	women	quad
WC Doubles	men	women	quad
Legends	men	women	seniors

Qualification
Singles	men	women
Doubles	men	women
- Wimbledon Championships

Players and pairs who neither have high enough rankings nor receive wild cards may participate in a qualifying tournament held one week before the annual Wimbledon Tennis Championships.

== Seeds ==
The top 6 seeds received a bye into the second round.

1. (Australia) Scott Draper (qualifying competition, lucky loser)
2. (Australia) Wally Masur (qualified)
3. (Sweden) Henrik Holm (second round)
4. (Germany) Arne Thoms (qualified)
5. (Sweden) Christian Bergström (qualified)
6. (Germany) Lars Burgsmüller (qualified)
7. (Germany) Patrick Baur (qualified)
8. (Italy) Laurence Tieleman (second round)
9. (Australia) Paul Kilderry (second round)
10. (Spain) Emilio Benfele Álvarez (qualifying competition, lucky loser)
11. (France) Lionel Barthez (qualifying competition, Lucky loser)
12. (United States) David Witt (second round)
13. (United States) Steve Bryan (second round)
14. (United States) Steve Campbell (first round)
15. (Australia) Jamie Morgan (qualified)
16. (The Bahamas) Roger Smith (second round)
17. (Italy) Diego Nargiso (qualified)
18. (United States) Kenny Thorne (first round)
19. (Canada) Daniel Nestor (qualified)
20. (Belgium) Dick Norman (qualifying competition, lucky loser)
21. (South Africa) David Adams (second round)
22. (Canada) Albert Chang (qualified)
23. (The Bahamas) Mark Knowles (qualified)
24. (United States) Louis Gloria (qualified)
25. (Spain) Gonzalo López-Fabero (first round)
26. (Australia) Neil Borwick (qualified)
27. (United States) Kent Kinnear (first round)
28. (Israel) Gilad Bloom (first round)
29. (Germany) Nicolas Kiefer (second round)
30. (Australia) Grant Doyle (second round)
31. (Netherlands) Martijn Bok (first round)
32. (Australia) Simon Youl (first round)

== Qualifiers ==
1. (Australia) Peter Tramacchi
2. (Australia) Wally Masur
3. (Australia) Andrew Painter
4. (Germany) Arne Thoms
5. (Sweden) Christian Bergström
6. (Germany) Lars Burgsmüller
7. (Germany) Patrick Baur
8. (Australia) Neil Borwick
9. (The Bahamas) Mark Knowles
10. (United States) Louis Gloria
11. (Canada) Albert Chang
12. (United States) Ken Flach
13. (Australia) Sandon Stolle
14. (Canada) Daniel Nestor
15. (Australia) Jamie Morgan
16. (Italy) Diego Nargiso

== Lucky losers ==
1. (Australia) Scott Draper
2. (France) Stéphane Simian
3. (Spain) Emilio Benfele Álvarez
4. (France) Lionel Barthez
5. (Belgium) Dick Norman
6. (Israel) Eyal Erlich

== Qualifying draw ==
=== First qualifier ===
First round
1	(Australia) Scott Draper
bye
(South Africa) Chris Haggard	6	4	6
(Sweden) Johan Sandberg	3	6	2
(Australia) Peter Tramacchi	7	6
WC	(United Kingdom) Jamie Delgado	6	3
(Netherlands) Fernon Wibier	6	4	6
31	(Netherlands) Martijn Bok	4	6	1

Second round
1	(Australia) Scott Draper	6	7
(South Africa) Chris Haggard	3	5
(Australia) Peter Tramacchi	6	6
(Netherlands) Fernon Wibier	2	4

Qualifying competition
1	(Australia) Scott Draper	2	1	3
(Australia) Peter Tramacchi	6	6	6

=== Second qualifier ===
First round
2	(Australia) Wally Masur
bye
(Brazil) Fabio Silberberg	6	6
(United Kingdom) Michael Wyeth	0	3
(United States) Donald Johnson	3	1
(Sweden) Patrik Fredriksson	6	6
(Australia) Todd Larkham	6	6
32	(Australia) Simon Youl	4	3

Second round
2	(Australia) Wally Masur	6	6	6
(Brazil) Fabio Silberberg	3	7	2
(Sweden) Patrik Fredriksson	6	4
(Australia) Todd Larkham	7	6

Qualifying competition
2	(Australia) Wally Masur	6	6^{6}	6	7^{7}
(Australia) Todd Larkham	1	7^{8}	3	6^{4}

=== Third qualifier ===
First round
3	(Sweden) Henrik Holm
bye
(France) Stéphane Simian	3	6	6
(Israel) Ofer Sela	6	3	3
(Australia) Andrew Painter	6	6	6
(Denmark) Patrik Langvardt	7	3	4
(Spain) Federico Sánchez	2	0
30	(Australia) Grant Doyle	6	6

Second round
3	(Sweden) Henrik Holm	4	2
(France) Stéphane Simian	6	6
(Australia) Andrew Painter	7	6
30	(Australia) Grant Doyle	5	3

Qualifying competition
(France) Stéphane Simian	7^{7}	4	6^{5}	6	2
(Australia) Andrew Painter	6^{5}	6	7^{7}	3	6

=== Fourth qualifier ===
First round
4	(Germany) Arne Thoms
bye
(South Africa) Ellis Ferreira	6	6	6
(South Africa) Clinton Marsh	7	2	3
WC	(United Kingdom) Dylan Williams	2	2
(France) Stéphane Huet	6	6
(South Africa) Gary Muller	6	6
29	(Germany) Nicolas Kiefer	7	7

Second round
4	(Germany) Arne Thoms	6	6	6
(South Africa) Ellis Ferreira	7	3	2
(France) Stéphane Huet	6	7
29	(Germany) Nicolas Kiefer	1	5

Qualifying competition
4	(Germany) Arne Thoms	4	6	7^{8}	2	8
(France) Stéphane Huet	6	2	6^{6}	6	6

=== Fifth qualifier ===
First round
5	(Sweden) Christian Bergström
bye
WC	(United Kingdom) Paul Hand	6	6
(Belgium) Gunter Vanderveeren	1	4
(South Africa) Howard Joffe	w/o
(Australia) Ben Ellwood
(South Korea) Kim Bong-soo	7	4	6
27	(United States) Kent Kinnear	6	6	2

Second round
5	(Sweden) Christian Bergström	6	3	7
WC	(United Kingdom) Paul Hand	4	6	5
(Australia) Ben Ellwood	4	6	6
(South Korea) Kim Bong-soo	6	3	2

Qualifying competition
5	(Sweden) Christian Bergström	5	6	6	6
(Australia) Ben Ellwood	7	3	2	2

=== Sixth qualifier ===
First round
6	(Germany) Lars Burgsmüller
bye
(Italy) Vincenzo Santopadre	6	6
(Sweden) Christian Wall	3	0
(United States) Jeff Belloli	6	6
(United Kingdom) Robert Paul	1	2
(Sweden) Lars-Anders Wahlgren	6	6
28	(Israel) Gilad Bloom	3	4

Second round
6	(Germany) Lars Burgsmüller	6	7
(Italy) Vincenzo Santopadre	1	6
(United States) Jeff Belloli	6	6
(Sweden) Lars-Anders Wahlgren	4	4

Qualifying competition
6	(Germany) Lars Burgsmüller	6	7^{7}	4	6
(United States) Jeff Belloli	3	6^{4}	6	0

=== Seventh qualifier ===
First round
7	(Germany) Patrick Baur	6	6
(United Kingdom) Michael Boulding	3	1
(United States) Richard Matuszewski	3
(United States) Bill Barber	2^{r}
(Argentina) Francisco Yunis	6	6
(Czech Republic) Jiří Pelikán	3	4
(Paraguay) Rubén Alvarenga	6	6
25	(Spain) Gonzalo López-Fabero	3	2

Second round
7	(Germany) Patrick Baur	5	6	6
(United States) Richard Matuszewski	7	3	2
(Argentina) Francisco Yunis	6	7
(Paraguay) Rubén Alvarenga	2	6

Qualifying competition
7	(Germany) Patrick Baur	6	6	6
(Argentina) Francisco Yunis	3	3	4

=== Eighth qualifier ===
First round
8	(Italy) Laurence Tieleman	7	6
(France) Antony Dupuis	6	1
(France) Philippe Pech	6	6	6
(Mexico) Marco Osorio	0	7	2
(Australia) Joshua Eagle	2	1
(Italy) Nicola Bruno	6	6
(South Africa) Kevin Ullyett	4	4
26	(Australia) Neil Borwick	6	6

Second round
8	(Italy) Laurence Tieleman	4	4
(France) Philippe Pech	6	6
(Italy) Nicola Bruno	3	2
26	(Australia) Neil Borwick	6	6

Qualifying competition
(France) Philippe Pech	2	6^{5}	2
26	(Australia) Neil Borwick	6	7^{7}	6

=== Ninth qualifier ===
First round
9	(Australia) Paul Kilderry	6	6
(United States) Brian MacPhie	2	3
(Mexico) Alejandro Hernández	3	2
(Netherlands) Stephen Noteboom	6	6
(United States) T. J. Middleton	6	4
WC	(United Kingdom) Paul Martin	7	6
(Australia) Ashley Naumann	2	2
23	(The Bahamas) Mark Knowles	6	6

Second round
9	(Australia) Paul Kilderry	4	4
(Netherlands) Stephen Noteboom	6	6
WC	(United Kingdom) Paul Martin	4	2
23	(The Bahamas) Mark Knowles	6	6

Qualifying competition
(Netherlands) Stephen Noteboom	3	6^{5}	3
23	(The Bahamas) Mark Knowles	6	7^{7}	6

=== Tenth qualifier ===
First round
10	(Spain) Emilio Benfele Álvarez	6	3	6
(Ghana) Frank Ofori	3	6	2
(Australia) James Sekulov	6	6
(India) Mahesh Bhupathi	1	4
(United States) David Pate	1	3
(Germany) Christian Saceanu	6	6
(United Kingdom) Jonathan Venison	2	2
24	(United States) Louis Gloria	6	6

Second round
10	(Spain) Emilio Benfele Álvarez	2	7	6
(Australia) James Sekulov	6	5	2
(Germany) Christian Saceanu	6	4	4
24	(United States) Louis Gloria	3	6	6

Qualifying competition
10	(Spain) Emilio Benfele Álvarez	3	3	0^{r}
24	(United States) Louis Gloria	6	6	3

=== Eleventh qualifier ===
First round
11	(France) Lionel Barthez	6	3
WC	(United Kingdom) Andrew Richardson	3	1^{r}
(United Kingdom) Arvind Parmar	2	4
(United States) Kelly Jones	6	6
WC	(United Kingdom) Martin Lee	3	6	6
(Argentina) Marcelo Wowk	6	3	2
(Sweden) Tobias Hildebrand	7	0	2
22	(Canada) Albert Chang	5	6	6

Second round
11	(France) Lionel Barthez	7	6
(United States) Kelly Jones	5	1
WC	(United Kingdom) Martin Lee	2	3
22	(Canada) Albert Chang	6	6

Qualifying competition
11	(France) Lionel Barthez	1	1	5
22	(Canada) Albert Chang	6	6	7

=== Twelfth qualifier ===
First round
12	(United States) David Witt	7	7
(Romania) Gabriel Trifu	5	5
(United States) Ken Flach	7	7
(Venezuela) Juan Carlos Bianchi	6	6
WC	(Australia) John Fitzgerald	6	6
(United States) Kip Brady	3	1
(Austria) Alex Antonitsch	6	4
21	(South Africa) David Adams	7	6

Second round
12	(United States) David Witt	2^{r}
(United States) Ken Flach	5
WC	(Australia) John Fitzgerald	6	6
21	(South Africa) David Adams	4	4

Qualifying competition
(United States) Ken Flach	6	5	7^{7}	6
WC	(Australia) John Fitzgerald	1	7	6^{5}	1

=== Thirteenth qualifier ===
First round
13	(United States) Steve Bryan	6	6
(France) Daniel Courcol	2	4
(Belgium) Denis van Uffelen	3	4
(Australia) Sandon Stolle	6	6
(Canada) Grant Connell	6	6
(United States) Martin Blackman	3	4
(Netherlands) Dennis van Scheppingen	6	1
20	(Belgium) Dick Norman	7	6

Second round
13	(United States) Steve Bryan	6	5	3
(Australia) Sandon Stolle	4	7	6
(Canada) Grant Connell	4	4
20	(Belgium) Dick Norman	6	6

Qualifying competition
(Australia) Sandon Stolle	3	6	6	6
20	(Belgium) Dick Norman	6	3	4	1

=== Fourteenth qualifier ===
First round
14	(United States) Steve Campbell	4	6
(United Kingdom) Andrew Foster	6	7
(Sweden) David Engel	1	2
(Switzerland) Filippo Veglio	6	6
(Sweden) Ola Kristiansson	7	6
(United Kingdom) Alex Osterrieth	5	0
(United Kingdom) Andre Wall	1	0
19	(Canada) Daniel Nestor	6	6

Second round
(United Kingdom) Andrew Foster	6	6
(Switzerland) Filippo Veglio	3	4
(Sweden) Ola Kristiansson	3	3
19	(Canada) Daniel Nestor	6	6

Qualifying competition
(United Kingdom) Andrew Foster	3	2	2
19	(Canada) Daniel Nestor	6	6	6

=== Fifteenth qualifier ===
First round
15	(Australia) Jamie Morgan	6	6
(United States) Todd Nelson	3	4
(Mexico) Ignacio Martínez	4	0
(South Africa) Marius Barnard	6	6
(New Zealand) James Greenhalgh	7	6
(Netherlands) Hendrik Jan Davids	6	4
(United Kingdom) Danny Ward	4	7	12
18	(United States) Kenny Thorne	6	6	10

Second round
15	(Australia) Jamie Morgan	6	6
(South Africa) Marius Barnard	4	2
(New Zealand) James Greenhalgh	7	6
(United Kingdom) Danny Ward	5	4

Qualifying competition
15	(Australia) Jamie Morgan	7^{7}	6	6
(New Zealand) James Greenhalgh	6^{5}	3	4

=== Sixteenth qualifier ===
First round
16	(The Bahamas) Roger Smith	6	6
(United Kingdom) Tom Hand	1	3
(United Kingdom) Gregg Saffery	2	4
(Israel) Eyal Erlich	6	6
(Canada) Jocelyn Robichaud	4	2
(Israel) Oren Motevassel	6	6
(United States) Doug Flach	2	3
17	(Italy) Diego Nargiso	6	6

Second round
16	(The Bahamas) Roger Smith	6	6	4
(Israel) Eyal Erlich	4	7	6
(Israel) Oren Motevassel	2	0
17	(Italy) Diego Nargiso	6	6

Qualifying competition
(Israel) Eyal Erlich	3	4	2
17	(Italy) Diego Nargiso	6	6	6
