= 1995 Wimbledon Championships – Men's doubles qualifying =

Men's doubles qualifying
- 1995 Wimbledon Championships

Events
Singles	men	women		boys	girls
Doubles	men	women	mixed	boys	girls
WC Singles	men	women	quad
WC Doubles	men	women	quad
Legends	men	women	seniors

Qualification
Singles	men	women
Doubles	men	women
- Wimbledon Championships

Players and pairs who neither have high enough rankings nor receive wild cards may participate in a qualifying tournament held one week before the annual Wimbledon Tennis Championships.

== Seeds ==
1. (France) Lionel Barthez / (Germany) Patrick Baur (second round)
2. (United States) Jeff Belloli / (India) Mahesh Bhupathi (first round)
3. (Australia) Jamie Morgan / (Australia) Michael Tebbutt (second round)
4. (Australia) Scott Draper / (Australia) Peter Tramacchi (qualified)
5. (Venezuela) Juan Carlos Bianchi / (Argentina) Roberto Saad (second round)
6. (New Zealand) James Greenhalgh / (South Africa) Chris Haggard (first round)

== Qualifiers ==
1. (Australia) Scott Draper / (Australia) Peter Tramacchi
2. (United Kingdom) Jamie Delgado / (United Kingdom) Gary Henderson
3. (United States) Doug Flach / (Netherlands) Michael Joyce

== Lucky losers ==
1. (Australia) Grant Doyle / (Australia) Todd Larkham

== Qualifying draw ==
=== First qualifier ===
First round
1	(France) Lionel Barthez (Germany) Patrick Baur	6	4	7
(Barbados) Martin Blackman (United States) Louis Gloria	3	6	5
(Israel) Eyal Erlich (Switzerland) Filippo Veglio	6	6
(Ghana) Frank Ofori (United Kingdom) Jonathan Venison	3	3
(Australia) Neil Borwick (The Bahamas) Roger Smith	6	6
(Australia) Ben Ellwood (Australia) Ashley Naumann	4	4
(Germany) Christian Saceanu (Israel) Ofer Sela	1	5
4	(Australia) Scott Draper (Australia) Peter Tramacchi	6	7

Second round
1	(France) Lionel Barthez (Germany) Patrick Baur	4	3
(Israel) Eyal Erlich (Switzerland) Filippo Veglio	6	6
(Australia) Neil Borwick (The Bahamas) Roger Smith	6	5
4	(Australia) Scott Draper (Australia) Peter Tramacchi	7	6

Qualifying competition
(Israel) Eyal Erlich (Switzerland) Filippo Veglio	3	6^{4}	3
4	(Australia) Scott Draper (Australia) Peter Tramacchi	6	7^{7}	6

=== Second qualifier ===
First round
2	(United States) Jeff Belloli (India) Mahesh Bhupathi	6	6	2
WC	(Sweden) Christian Wall (United Kingdom) Danny Ward	2	7	6
(United States) T. J. Middleton (Germany) Arne Thoms	4	6	21
(United States) Richard Matuszewski (United States) Todd Nelson	6	4	23
(Spain) Emilio Benfele Álvarez (Italy) Vincenzo Santopadre	w/o
Alt	(Australia) Andrew Painter (Australia) James Sekulov
(United Kingdom) Jamie Delgado (United Kingdom) Gary Henderson	7	2	6
6	(New Zealand) James Greenhalgh (South Africa) Chris Haggard	5	6	1

Second round
WC	(Sweden) Christian Wall (United Kingdom) Danny Ward	4	6	2
(United States) Richard Matuszewski (United States) Todd Nelson	6	2	6
Alt	(Australia) Andrew Painter (Australia) James Sekulov	5	4
(United Kingdom) Jamie Delgado (United Kingdom) Gary Henderson	7	6

Qualifying competition
(United States) Richard Matuszewski (United States) Todd Nelson	6	4	6^{2}	6^{6}
(United Kingdom) Jamie Delgado (United Kingdom) Gary Henderson	4	6	7^{7}	7^{8}

=== Third qualifier ===
First round
3	(Australia) Jamie Morgan (Australia) Michael Tebbutt	7	7
(Paraguay) Rubén Alvarenga (Argentina) Marcello Wowk	6	6
(United States) Doug Flach (Netherlands) Michael Joyce	4	6	6
(Italy) Nicola Bruno (Italy) Laurence Tieleman	6	4	4
(United Kingdom) Gregg Saffery (United Kingdom) Michael Wyeth	1	6
(Australia) Grant Doyle (Australia) Todd Larkham	6	7
(United States) Kip Brady (Mexico) Marco Osorio	6	3
5	(Venezuela) Juan Carlos Bianchi (Argentina) Roberto Saad	7	6

Second round
3	(Australia) Jamie Morgan (Australia) Michael Tebbutt	6	6
(United States) Doug Flach (Netherlands) Michael Joyce	7	7
(Australia) Grant Doyle (Australia) Todd Larkham	6	5	6
5	(Venezuela) Juan Carlos Bianchi (Argentina) Roberto Saad	3	7	3

Qualifying competition
(United States) Doug Flach (Netherlands) Michael Joyce	6^{6}	6	6	6
(Australia) Grant Doyle (Australia) Todd Larkham	7^{8}	4	4	1
