= 1994 Mercedes Cup – Singles =

Singles
- 1994 Mercedes Cup

Final
- Champion: (Spain) Alberto Berasategui
- Runner-up: (Italy) Andrea Gaudenzi
- Score: 7–5, 6–3, 7–6^{(7–5)}

Details
- Draw: 48 (4WC/6Q)
- Seeds: 16

Events
Singles	Doubles
- Stuttgart Open

Magnus Gustafsson was the defending champion, but did not compete this year.

Fourth-seeded Alberto Berasategui won the title by defeating Andrea Gaudenzi 7–5, 6–3, 7–6^{(7–5)} in the final.

== Seeds ==
All seeds received a bye into the second round.

1. (Germany) Michael Stich (quarterfinals)
2. (Ukraine) Andrei Medvedev (second round)
3. (Austria) Thomas Muster (quarterfinals)
4. (Spain) Alberto Berasategui (champion)
5. (Russia) Yevgeny Kafelnikov (quarterfinals)
6. (Spain) Carlos Costa (second round)
7. (Spain) Javier Sánchez (second round)
8. (Netherlands) Paul Haarhuis (second round)
9. (Sweden) Magnus Larsson (second round)
10. (Italy) Andrea Gaudenzi (final)
11. (Czech Republic) Sláva Doseděl (second round)
12. (Russia) Andrei Chesnokov (semifinals)
13. (Austria) Gilbert Schaller (second round)
14. (Italy) Renzo Furlan (second round)
15. (Germany) Karsten Braasch (second round)
16. (Czech Republic) Daniel Vacek (second round)

== Draw ==
Key

- Q = Qualifier
- WC = Wild card
- LL = Lucky loser
- Alt = Alternate
- ITF = ITF entry
- PR = Protected ranking
- SR = Special ranking
- SE = Special exempt
- JE = Junior exempt
- JR = Junior Accelerator Programme entrant
- CO = College Accelerator Programme entrant
- NG = Next Gen Accelerator Program entrant
- w/o = Walkover
- r = Retired
- d = Defaulted

=== Finals ===
Quarterfinals
1	(Germany) Michael Stich	2	2
10	(Italy) Andrea Gaudenzi	6	6
3	(Austria) Thomas Muster	3	6	4
12	(Russia) Andrei Chesnokov	6	4	6
5	(Russia) Yevgeny Kafelnikov	4	0
4	(Spain) Alberto Berasategui	6	6
(Germany) Bernd Karbacher	6	7^{7}
(Sweden) Lars Jönsson	3	6^{3}

Semifinals
10	(Italy) Andrea Gaudenzi	6	6^{5}	6
12	(Russia) Andrei Chesnokov	4	7^{7}	3
4	(Spain) Alberto Berasategui	5	6	6
(Germany) Bernd Karbacher	7	3	0

Final
10	(Italy) Andrea Gaudenzi	5	3	6^{5}
4	(Spain) Alberto Berasategui	7	6	7^{7}

=== Top half ===
==== Section 1 ====
First round
Q	(Germany) C Arriens	4	7^{7}	6
Q	(Germany) L Burgsmüller	6	6^{3}	3
(Austria) H Skoff	6	6
(Russia) A Cherkasov	4	2
(France) H Leconte	2	7	3
Q	(Argentina) L Lobo	6	5	6
(Germany) H Dreekmann	2	3
(Spain) A Costa	6	6

Second round
1	(Germany) M Stich	6	2	6
Q	(Germany) C Arriens	2	6	2
(Austria) H Skoff	6	3	6
16	(Czech Republic) D Vacek	4	6	4
10	(Italy) A Gaudenzi	6
Q	(Argentina) L Lobo	2	r
(Spain) A Costa	3	6	6
7	(Spain) J Sánchez	6	3	2

Third round
1	(Germany) M Stich	7	6
(Austria) H Skoff	5	3
10	(Italy) A Gaudenzi	4	6	6
(Spain) A Costa	6	1	0

Quarterfinals
1	(Germany) M Stich	2	2
10	(Italy) A Gaudenzi	6	6

==== Section 2 ====
First round
Q	(Spain) JA Viloca	3	6	6
(France) R Gilbert	6	1	1
WC	(Germany) U Riglewski	6^{2}	3
(Argentina) F Davín	7^{7}	6
(Spain) T Carbonell	2	1
(France) JP Fleurian	6	6
WC	(Germany) CU Steeb	4	1
(Australia) R Fromberg	6	6

Second round
3	(Austria) T Muster	6	6
Q	(Spain) JA Viloca	3	2
(Argentina) F Davín	6	6
14	(Italy) R Furlan	4	4
12	(Russia) A Chesnokov	6	6
(France) JP Fleurian	3	1
(Australia) R Fromberg	4	7^{7}	7^{8}
6	(Spain) C Costa	6	6^{3}	6^{6}

Third round
3	(Austria) T Muster	6	6
(Argentina) F Davín	2	3
12	(Russia) A Chesnokov	4	7^{7}	7
(Australia) R Fromberg	6	6^{1}	5

Quarterfinals
3	(Austria) T Muster	3	6	4
12	(Russia) A Chesnokov	6	4	6

=== Bottom half ===
==== Section 3 ====
First round
(Spain) À Corretja	5	6	6
WC	(France) G Forget	7	2	1
(Morocco) K Alami	4	5
(Morocco) Y El Aynaoui	6	7
(Netherlands) J Eltingh	7^{7}	5	1
WC	(Spain) E Sánchez	6^{3}	7	6
(Spain) J Burillo	1	6	4
(Czech Republic) K Nováček	6	3	6

Second round
5	(Russia) Y Kafelnikov	6	6
(Spain) À Corretja	3	2
(Morocco) Y El Aynaoui	7^{7}	6
11	(Czech Republic) S Doseděl	6^{0}	3
13	(Austria) G Schaller	6^{5}	4
WC	(Spain) E Sánchez	7^{7}	6
(Czech Republic) K Nováček	6	3	5
4	(Spain) A Berasategui	2	6	7

Third round
5	(Russia) Y Kafelnikov	7^{8}	6
(Morocco) Y El Aynaoui	6^{6}	4
WC	(Spain) E Sánchez	4	4
4	(Spain) A Berasategui	6	6

Quarterfinals
5	(Russia) Y Kafelnikov	4	0
4	(Spain) A Berasategui	6	6

==== Section 4 ====
First round
(Germany) B Karbacher	6	6^{3}	6
(Germany) J Renzenbrink	3	7^{7}	4
(Spain) J Arrese	2	2
Q	(Hungary) S Noszály	6	6
(Russia) A Olhovskiy	1	4
(Sweden) L Jönsson	6	6
(Germany) MK Goellner	4	7	6
Q	(Netherlands) T Nijssen	6	5	3

Second round
8	(Netherlands) P Haarhuis	6^{7}	2
(Germany) B Karbacher	7^{9}	6
Q	(Hungary) S Noszály	6	6
9	(Sweden) M Larsson	1	3
15	(Germany) K Braasch	3	4
(Sweden) L Jönsson	6	6
(Germany) MK Goellner	7^{7}	6
2	(Ukraine) A Medvedev	6^{3}	2

Third round
(Germany) B Karbacher	4	6	7^{7}
Q	(Hungary) S Noszály	6	1	6^{2}
(Sweden) L Jönsson	7^{13}	6
(Germany) MK Goellner	6^{11}	3

Quarterfinals
(Germany) B Karbacher	6	7^{7}
(Sweden) L Jönsson	3	6^{3}

== Qualifying ==
=== Qualifying seeds ===
1. (Sweden) Christian Bergström (qualifying competition)
2. (Italy) Diego Nargiso (second round)
3. (Germany) David Prinosil (second round)
4. (South Africa) Marcos Ondruska (second round)
5. (South Africa) David Adams (qualifying competition)
6. (Germany) Martin Sinner (qualifying competition)
7. (Spain) Francisco Roig (second round)
8. (Germany) Thomas Gollwitzer (first round)
9. (Romania) Alexandru Rădulescu (second round)
10. (Czech Republic) Libor Němeček (second round)
11. (Hungary) Sándor Noszály (qualified)
12. (Germany) Lars Burgsmüller (qualified)

=== Qualifiers ===
1. (Hungary) Sándor Noszály
2. (Germany) Lars Burgsmüller
3. (Netherlands) Tom Nijssen
4. (Germany) Carsten Arriens
5. (Spain) Juan Albert Viloca
6. (Argentina) Luis Lobo

=== Qualifying draws ===
==== First qualifier ====
First round
1	(Sweden) Christian Bergström	6	6
WC	(Germany) Robin Schneider	2	4
(Argentina) Carlos Gómez-Díaz	6	6
WC	(France) Jean-Noël Grinda	4	2
(Germany) Andreas Lesch	6	2
(Argentina) Gerardo Mirad	7	6
(France) Nicolas Kischkewitz	6	1	2
11	(Hungary) Sándor Noszály	0	6	6

Second round
1	(Sweden) Christian Bergström	6	6
(Argentina) Carlos Gómez-Díaz	2	2
(Argentina) Gerardo Mirad	6	2
11	(Hungary) Sándor Noszály	7	6

Qualifying competition
1	(Sweden) Christian Bergström	2	4
11	(Hungary) Sándor Noszály	6	6

==== Second qualifier ====
First round
2	(Italy) Diego Nargiso	7	6
(Germany) Milan Palme	6	3
(Spain) Álex Calatrava	7	6
(France) Jérôme Hanquez	5	3
(Argentina) Francisco Yunis	6	6
WC	(Germany) Jan Gruninger	3	3
(Germany) Jens Wöhrmann	3	7	5
12	(Germany) Lars Burgsmüller	6	5	7

Second round
2	(Italy) Diego Nargiso	2	2
(Spain) Álex Calatrava	6	6
(Argentina) Francisco Yunis	1	6
12	(Germany) Lars Burgsmüller	6	7

Qualifying competition
(Spain) Álex Calatrava	2	3
12	(Germany) Lars Burgsmüller	6	6

==== Third qualifier ====
First round
3	(Germany) David Prinosil	6	1	7
(United States) Donald Johnson	3	6	6
(Russia) Andrei Merinov	0	6	3
(Germany) Simon Touzil	6	2	6
(Austria) Roland Burtscher	6	3	1
(Netherlands) Tom Nijssen	3	6	6
(Brazil) Otávio Della	2	4
9	(Romania) Alexandru Rădulescu	6	6

Second round
3	(Germany) David Prinosil	6	5
(Germany) Simon Touzil	7	7
(Netherlands) Tom Nijssen	7	6
9	(Romania) Alexandru Rădulescu	5	2

Qualifying competition
(Germany) Simon Touzil	6	6	6
(Netherlands) Tom Nijssen	7	3	7

==== Fourth qualifier ====
First round
4	(South Africa) Marcos Ondruska	6	6
(Spain) Albert Portas	1	4
(Germany) Carsten Arriens	6	6
(Italy) Federico Mordegan	4	2
(Spain) Germán Puentes	6	2
(Germany) Sascha Bandermann	7	6
(Spain) Gonzalo López-Fabero	2	2
10	(Czech Republic) Libor Němeček	6	6

Second round
4	(South Africa) Marcos Ondruska	2	3
(Germany) Carsten Arriens	6	6
(Germany) Sascha Bandermann	7	6
10	(Czech Republic) Libor Němeček	5	4

Qualifying competition
(Germany) Carsten Arriens	7	6
(Germany) Sascha Bandermann	6	4

==== Fifth qualifier ====
First round
5	(South Africa) David Adams	6	6
(Sweden) Rikard Bergh	1	4
(Italy) Claudio Pistolesi	7	4	6
(France) Stéphane Matheu	6	6	4
WC	(Iran) Mansour Bahrami	1	2
(Spain) Juan Albert Viloca	6	6
(Slovakia) Branislav Stankovič	6	4	6
7	(Spain) Francisco Roig	2	6	1

Second round
5	(South Africa) David Adams	7	7
(Italy) Claudio Pistolesi	5	5
(Spain) Juan Albert Viloca	6	6
7	(Spain) Francisco Roig	4	3

Qualifying competition
5	(South Africa) David Adams	3	3
(Spain) Juan Albert Viloca	6	6

==== Sixth qualifier ====
First round
6	(Germany) Martin Sinner	6	6
(Germany) Michael Geserer	3	1
(Germany) Sascha Nensel	7	7
WC	(Germany) Alexander Hizli	6	6
(Germany) Christian Tambue	7	6
(Germany) Holger Speker	6	3
(Argentina) Luis Lobo	6	6
8	(Germany) Thomas Gollwitzer	4	2

Second round
6	(Germany) Martin Sinner	6	6
(Germany) Sascha Nensel	4	1
(Germany) Christian Tambue	4	3
(Argentina) Luis Lobo	6	6

Qualifying competition
6	(Germany) Martin Sinner	4	4
(Argentina) Luis Lobo	6	6
