= 1995 Wimbledon Championships – Women's doubles qualifying =

Women's doubles qualifying
- 1995 Wimbledon Championships

Events
Singles	men	women		boys	girls
Doubles	men	women	mixed	boys	girls
WC Singles	men	women	quad
WC Doubles	men	women	quad
Legends	men	women	seniors

Qualification
Singles	men	women
Doubles	men	women
- Wimbledon Championships

Players and pairs who neither have high enough rankings nor receive wild cards may participate in a qualifying tournament held one week before the annual Wimbledon Tennis Championships.

== Seeds ==
1. (Australia) Kristin Godridge / (Australia) Kirrily Sharpe (qualified)
2. (South Africa) Joannette Kruger / (Austria) Petra Schwarz-Ritter (qualifying competition, lucky losers)
3. (Japan) Ei Iida / (Japan) Miho Saeki (second round)
4. (United States) Erika deLone / (Australia) Nicole Pratt (qualifying competition)

== Qualifiers ==
1. (Australia) Kristin Godridge / (Australia) Kirrily Sharpe
2. (Netherlands) Yvette Basting / (Netherlands) Petra Kamstra

== Lucky losers ==
1. (South Africa) Joannette Kruger / (Austria) Petra Schwarz-Ritter

== Qualifying draw ==
=== First qualifier ===
First round
1	(Australia) Kristin Godridge (Australia) Kirrily Sharpe	6	6
WC	(United Kingdom) Kaye Hand (United Kingdom) Claire Taylor	0	3
(Australia) Siobhan Drake-Brockman (Australia) Trudi Musgrave	7	6
(United States) Elly Hakami (United States) Stephanie Reece	6	2
4	(United States) Erika deLone (Australia) Nicole Pratt	7	6
(United States) Rebecca Jensen (Australia) Danielle Jones	5	3
(Czech Republic) Květa Hrdličková (Netherlands) Seda Noorlander	6	4
(Australia) Annabel Ellwood (United States) Julie Steven	7	6

Second round
1	(Australia) Kristin Godridge (Australia) Kirrily Sharpe	6	6
(Australia) Siobhan Drake-Brockman (Australia) Trudi Musgrave	1	0
4	(United States) Erika deLone (Australia) Nicole Pratt	6	6
(Australia) Annabel Ellwood (United States) Julie Steven	0	4

Qualifying competition
1	(Australia) Kristin Godridge (Australia) Kirrily Sharpe	4	6	6
4	(United States) Erika deLone (Australia) Nicole Pratt	6	3	4

=== Second qualifier ===
First round
(Germany) Anca Barna (Argentina) Laura Montalvo	4	2
(Netherlands) Yvette Basting (Netherlands) Petra Kamstra	6	6
(Hungary) Virág Csurgó (Georgia (country)) Nino Louarsabishvili	4	1
3	(Japan) Ei Iida (Japan) Miho Saeki	6	6
(Germany) Angela Kerek (Slovakia) Denisa Szabová	4	1
(Germany) Caroline Schneider (Austria) Melanie Schnell	6	6
(France) Caroline Dhenin (United States) Vickie Paynter	2	4
2	(South Africa) Joannette Kruger (Austria) Petra Schwarz-Ritter	6	6

Second round
(Netherlands) Yvette Basting (Netherlands) Petra Kamstra	6	6
3	(Japan) Ei Iida (Japan) Miho Saeki	3	4
(Germany) Caroline Schneider (Austria) Melanie Schnell	7	2	4
2	(South Africa) Joannette Kruger (Austria) Petra Schwarz-Ritter	6	6	6

Qualifying competition
(Netherlands) Yvette Basting (Netherlands) Petra Kamstra	6	7
2	(South Africa) Joannette Kruger (Austria) Petra Schwarz-Ritter	2	5
