= 1995 Wimbledon Championships – Women's singles qualifying =

Women's singles qualifying
- 1995 Wimbledon Championships

Events
Singles	men	women		boys	girls
Doubles	men	women	mixed	boys	girls
WC Singles	men	women	quad
WC Doubles	men	women	quad
Legends	men	women	seniors

Qualification
Singles	men	women
Doubles	men	women
- Wimbledon Championships

Players and pairs who neither have high enough rankings nor receive wild cards may participate in a qualifying tournament held one week before the annual Wimbledon Tennis Championships.

== Seeds ==
1. (Belgium) Els Callens (first round)
2. (Romania) Cătălina Cristea (first round)
3. (Venezuela) María Vento (qualifying competition, lucky loser)
4. (United States) Meilen Tu (second round)
5. (Hong Kong) Tang Min (first round)
6. (United States) Erika deLone (qualifying competition)
7. (Italy) Rita Grande (second round)
8. (Argentina) Mercedes Paz (second round)
9. (Russia) Eugenia Maniokova (first round)
10. (Slovakia) Denisa Szabová (qualifying competition)
11. (Madagascar) Dally Randriantefy (second round)
12. (United States) Lindsay Lee (qualified)
13. (Russia) Tatiana Panova (qualifying competition)
14. (Netherlands) Kim de Weille (second round)
15. (United States) Laxmi Poruri (qualifying competition)
16. (United States) Katrina Adams (qualified)

== Qualifiers ==
1. (United States) Katrina Adams
2. (Austria) Melanie Schnell
3. (Germany) Claudia Porwik
4. (United States) Lindsay Lee
5. (Australia) Rennae Stubbs
6. (United Kingdom) Amanda Wainwright
7. (Netherlands) Petra Kamstra
8. (Italy) Gloria Pizzichini

== Lucky loser ==
1. (Venezuela) María Vento

== Qualifying draw ==
=== First qualifier ===
First round
1	(Belgium) Els Callens	6^{5}	3
(Netherlands) Caroline Vis	7^{7}	6
(Australia) Kirrily Sharpe	6^{2}	5
(Australia) Kristin Godridge	7^{7}	7
(Australia) Kerry-Anne Guse	4	2
(Netherlands) Manon Bollegraf	6	6
(South Africa) Dinky van Rensburg	7	6^{6}	5
16	(United States) Katrina Adams	5	7^{8}	7

Second round
(Netherlands) Caroline Vis	7^{7}	6
(Australia) Kristin Godridge	6^{2}	3
(Netherlands) Manon Bollegraf	3	4
16	(United States) Katrina Adams	6	6

Qualifying competition
(Netherlands) Caroline Vis	6	4	5
16	(United States) Katrina Adams	3	6	7

=== Second qualifier ===
First round
13	(Russia) Tatiana Panova	6	7^{7}
WC	(United Kingdom) Michele Mair	2	6^{5}
(Australia) Catherine Barclay	7	4	5
WC	(United Kingdom) Claire Taylor	5	6	7
(Austria) Melanie Schnell	6	6
(France) Caroline Dhenin	2	3
(South Africa) Nannie de Villiers	6	3	3
7	(Italy) Rita Grande	4	6	6

Second round
13	(Russia) Tatiana Panova	7^{7}	1	6
WC	(United Kingdom) Claire Taylor	6^{5}	6	3
(Austria) Melanie Schnell	6	7
(Italy) Rita Grande	2	5

Qualifying competition
13	(Russia) Tatiana Panova	4	7^{8}	1
(Austria) Melanie Schnell	6	6^{6}	6

=== Third qualifier ===
First round
4	(United States) Meilen Tu	6	6
(Netherlands) Yvette Basting	3	1
WC	(Germany) Claudia Porwik	7	6
(Georgia (country)) Nino Louarsabishvili	5	3
(Germany) Angela Kerek	6	2	6
WC	(United Kingdom) Lucie Ahl	1	6	4
(Czechoslovakia) Helena Vildová	4	4
10	(Slovakia) Denisa Szabová	6	6

Second round
4	(United States) Meilen Tu	2	6	3
WC	(Germany) Claudia Porwik	6	2	6
(Germany) Angela Kerek	5	7^{7}	4
10	(Slovakia) Denisa Szabová	7	6^{5}	6

Qualifying competition
WC	(Germany) Claudia Porwik	6	6
10	(Slovakia) Denisa Szabová	0	1

=== Fourth qualifier ===
First round
12	(United States) Lindsay Lee	6	6
WC	(United Kingdom) Kaye Hand	1	2
(Austria) Marion Maruska	6	6^{4}	6
(Thailand) Tamarine Tanasugarn	4	7^{7}	2
(Germany) Anca Barna	6	6
WC	(United Kingdom) Joanne Ward	3	3
(France) Nathalie Herreman	1	4
6	(United States) Erika deLone	6	6

Second round
12	(United States) Lindsay Lee	7^{7}	6
(Austria) Marion Maruska	6^{3}	2
(Germany) Anca Barna	3	0
6	(United States) Erika deLone	6	6

Qualifying competition
12	(United States) Lindsay Lee	6	7
6	(United States) Erika deLone	3	5

=== Fifth qualifier ===
First round
5	(Hong Kong) Tang Min	5	4
(Australia) Siobhan Drake-Brockman	7	6
(Japan) Rika Hiraki	6	6
(France) Anne-Gaëlle Sidot	2	2
(France) Virginie Buisson	4	4
(Australia) Rennae Stubbs	6	6
(United States) Janet Lee	6^{4}	3
14	(Netherlands) Kim de Weille	7^{7}	6

Second round
(Australia) Siobhan Drake-Brockman	5	1
(Japan) Rika Hiraki	7	6
(Australia) Rennae Stubbs	7	6
14	(Netherlands) Kim de Weille	5	3

Qualifying competition
(Japan) Rika Hiraki	1	2
(Australia) Rennae Stubbs	6	6

=== Sixth qualifier ===
First round
11	(Madagascar) Dally Randriantefy	6	6
(San Marino) Ludmila Varmužová	0	2
(United States) Erica Adams	6	6^{4}	3
WC	(United Kingdom) Amanda Wainwright	3	7^{7}	6
(Netherlands) Nicole Muns-Jagerman	3	6	2
(Czech Republic) Květa Hrdličková	6	2	6
(Argentina) Laura Montalvo	2	2
3	(Venezuela) María Vento	6	6

Second round
11	(Madagascar) Dally Randriantefy	7^{7}	6^{8}	5
WC	(United Kingdom) Amanda Wainwright	6^{2}	7^{10}	6
(Czech Republic) Květa Hrdličková	6	5	4
3	(Venezuela) María Vento	4	7	6

Qualifying competition
WC	(United Kingdom) Amanda Wainwright	0	7^{7}	6
3	(Venezuela) María Vento	6	6^{5}	2

=== Seventh qualifier ===
First round
8	(Argentina) Mercedes Paz	6	3	6
WC	(United Kingdom) Kate Warne-Holland	2	6	3
(Japan) Hiromi Nagano	2	2
(Hungary) Virág Csurgó	6	6
(Netherlands) Petra Kamstra	6	6
(Italy) Laura Garrone	1	1
(Canada) Sonya Jeyaseelan	6	6
9	(Russia) Eugenia Maniokova	4	2

Second round
8	(Argentina) Mercedes Paz	1	5
(Hungary) Virág Csurgó	6	7
(Netherlands) Petra Kamstra	4	6	6
(Canada) Sonya Jeyaseelan	6	3	1

Qualifying competition
(Hungary) Virág Csurgó	6	3	4
(Netherlands) Petra Kamstra	3	6	6

=== Eighth qualifier ===
First round
15	(United States) Laxmi Poruri	6	6^{5}	6
(United States) Elly Hakami	2	7^{7}	4
(Netherlands) Maaike Koutstaal	3	5
(Australia) Annabel Ellwood	6	7
(Germany) Petra Winzenhöller	1	3
(Italy) Gloria Pizzichini	6	6
(United States) Eleni Rossides	6	6
2	(Romania) Cătălina Cristea	4	4

Second round
15	(United States) Laxmi Poruri	6	4	10
(Australia) Annabel Ellwood	1	6	8
(Italy) Gloria Pizzichini	6	6^{5}	6
(United States) Eleni Rossides	4	7^{7}	2

Qualifying competition
15	(United States) Laxmi Poruri	7	4	5
(Italy) Gloria Pizzichini	5	6	7
