= 1996 Mercedes Cup – Doubles =

Doubles
- 1996 Mercedes Cup
- 1995 Champion: (Spain) Tomás Carbonell (Spain) Francisco Roig

Final
- Champion: (Belgium) Libor Pimek (South Africa) Byron Talbot
- Runner-up: (Spain) Tomás Carbonell (Spain) Francisco Roig
- Score: 6–2, 5–7, 6–4

Details
- Draw: 24
- Seeds: 8

Events
Singles	Doubles
← 1995 ·	Stuttgart Open	· 1997 →

Tomás Carbonell and Francisco Roig were the defending champions but lost in the final 6–2, 5–7, 6–4 against Libor Pimek and Byron Talbot.

== Seeds ==
Champion seeds are indicated in bold text while text in italics indicates the round in which those seeds were eliminated. All eight seeded teams received byes into the second round.

1. (Russia) Yevgeny Kafelnikov / (Netherlands) Menno Oosting (second round)
2. (Argentina) Luis Lobo / (Spain) Javier Sánchez (second round)
3. (Belgium) **Libor Pimek** / (South Africa) **Byron Talbot (champions)**
4. (Spain) Tomás Carbonell / (Spain) Francisco Roig (final)
5. (Czech Republic) Jiří Novák / (Czech Republic) David Rikl (quarterfinals)
6. (South Africa) David Adams / (Sweden) Peter Nyborg (quarterfinals)
7. (United States) Trevor Kronemann / (Australia) David Macpherson (semifinals)
8. (South Africa) John-Laffnie de Jager / (Netherlands) Sjeng Schalken (quarterfinals)

== Draw ==
=== Key ===
- Q = Qualifier
- WC = Wild card
- LL = Lucky loser
- Alt = Alternate
- ITF = ITF entry
- PR = Protected ranking
- SR = Special ranking
- SE = Special exempt
- JE = Junior exempt
- JR = Junior Accelerator Programme entrant
- CO = College Accelerator Programme entrant
- NG = Next Gen Accelerator Program entrant
- w/o = Walkover
- r = Retired
- d = Defaulted

=== Final ===
Final

4
- (Spain) Tomás Carbonell
- (Spain) Francisco Roig
2
**7**
4

3
- (Belgium) **Libor Pimek**
- (South Africa) **Byron Talbot**
**6**
5
**6**

=== Top half ===
First round

Second round

Quarterfinals

Semifinals

1
- (Russia) Y Kafelnikov
- (Netherlands) M Oosting
4
4

- (Australia) J Ireland
- (North Macedonia) A Kitinov
4
4

- (Czech Republic) **C Doseděl**
- (Czech Republic) **P Vízner**
**6**
**6**

- (Czech Republic) **C Doseděl**
- (Czech Republic) **P Vízner**
**6**
**6**

- (Czech Republic) **C Doseděl**
- (Czech Republic) **P Vízner**
**6**
**6**

Q
- (Brazil) **G Kuerten**
- (Brazil) **F Meligeni**
**6**
**6**

8
- (South Africa) J-L de Jager
- (Netherlands) S Schalken
4
0

WC
- (Russia) A Chesnokov
- (Argentina) H Gumy
3
2

Q
- (Brazil) G Kuerten
- (Brazil) F Meligeni
2
4

8
- (South Africa) **J-L de Jager**
- (Netherlands) **S Schalken**
**6**
**6**

- (Czech Republic) C Doseděl
- (Czech Republic) P Vízner
4
4

4
- (Spain) **T Carbonell**
- (Spain) **F Roig**
**6**
**6**

4
- (Spain) **T Carbonell**
- (Spain) **F Roig**
**6**
**6**

- (Sweden) D Ekerot
- (Netherlands) S Noteboom
**6**
3
5

- (Netherlands) T Kempers
- (Netherlands) T Nijssen
1
4

- (Netherlands) **T Kempers**
- (Netherlands) **T Nijssen**
3
**6**
**7**

4
- (Spain) **T Carbonell**
- (Spain) **F Roig**
**6**
**6**

- (United States) J Belloli
- (Italy) C Brandi
1
2

6
- (South Africa) D Adams
- (Sweden) P Nyborg
4
3

WC
- (Austria) **T Muster**
- (Austria) **C Trimmel**
**6**
**6**

WC
- (Austria) T Muster
- (Austria) C Trimmel
6
4

6
- (South Africa) **D Adams**
- (Sweden) **P Nyborg**
**7**
**6**

=== Bottom half ===
First round

Second round

Quarterfinals

Semifinals

5
- (Czech Republic) **J Novák**
- (Czech Republic) **D Rikl**
**7**
**6**

- (Spain) **E Benfele Álvarez**
- (Spain) **À Corretja**
4
**6**
**7**

- (Spain) E Benfele Álvarez
- (Spain) À Corretja
6
3

WC
- (Sweden) M Tillström
- (Czech Republic) B Ulihrach
**6**
4
6

5
- (Czech Republic) J Novák
- (Czech Republic) D Rikl
**7**
3
4

- (Sweden) **R Bergh**
- (France) **O Delaître**
**6**
**6**

3
- (Belgium) **L Pimek**
- (South Africa) **B Talbot**
6
**6**
**6**

- (Spain) J A Conde
- (United States) J Waite
3
2

- (Sweden) R Bergh
- (France) O Delaître
4
**6**
3

3
- (Belgium) **L Pimek**
- (South Africa) **B Talbot**
**6**
4
**6**

3
- (Belgium) **L Pimek**
- (South Africa) **B Talbot**
**6**
**7**

7
- (United States) T Kronemann
- (Australia) D Macpherson
4
6

7
- (United States) **T Kronemann**
- (Australia) **D Macpherson**
**6**
**7**

- (Hungary) G Köves
- (Hungary) L Markovits
4
1

WC
- (Germany) K Braasch
- (Spain) S Bruguera
4
6

WC
- (Germany) **K Braasch**
- (Spain) **S Bruguera**
**6**
**6**

7
- (United States) **T Kronemann**
- (Australia) **D Macpherson**
**6**
5
**6**

- (United States) S Cannon
- (United States) G Van Emburgh
6
**6**
3

- (Australia) J Eagle
- (Australia) A Florent
4
**7**
2

- (Australia) **J Eagle**
- (Australia) **A Florent**
**7**
4
**6**

- (Australia) **J Eagle**
- (Australia) **A Florent**
4
**6**
**6**

2
- (Argentina) L Lobo
- (Spain) J Sánchez
**6**
2
2
