= Johan Sandberg =

Swedish tennis player

- Country (sports): Sweden
- Born: 12 May 1970 (age 54); Malmö, Sweden
- Height: 6 ft 4 in (193 cm)
- Plays: Right-handed

Singles
- Career record: 0–2
- Highest ranking: No. 525 (22 May 1995)

Grand Slam singles results
- Wimbledon: Q1 (1995)

Doubles
- Highest ranking: No. 738 (15 May 1995)

Johan Sandberg (born 12 May 1970) is a Swedish former professional tennis player.

Born in Malmö, Sandberg was a third ranked junior in Sweden and played collegiate tennis for the University of South Carolina (USC) from 1990 to 1994. His doubles partnership with José Frontera ranked five in the country, which was a USC record. In 1994 he earned All-American honours for singles. Following college he competed briefly on the international tour and featured in the qualifying draw at the 1995 Wimbledon Championships.
