= 1993 Mercedes Cup – Singles =

Sports tournament

Singles
- 1993 Mercedes Cup

Final
- Champion: (Sweden) Magnus Gustafsson
- Runner-up: (Germany) Michael Stich
- Score: 6–3, 6–4, 3–6, 4–6, 6–4

Details
- Draw: 48 (4WC/6Q/1LL)
- Seeds: 16

Events
Singles	Doubles
- Stuttgart Open

Andrei Medvedev was the defending champion, but lost in the semifinals to Michael Stich.

Magnus Gustafsson, who was seeded 16th, won the title by defeating Stich 6–3, 6–4, 3–6, 4–6, 6–4 in the final.

== Seeds ==
All seeds received a bye to the second round.

1. (Spain) Sergi Bruguera (second round)
2. (Germany) Michael Stich (final)
3. (Ukraine) Andrei Medvedev (semifinals)
4. (Czech Republic) Karel Nováček (quarterfinals)
5. (Austria) Thomas Muster (third round)
6. (France) Cédric Pioline (second round)
7. (France) Arnaud Boetsch (third round)
8. (Spain) Emilio Sánchez (third round)
9. (South Africa) Marcos Ondruska (quarterfinals)
10. (Russia) Andrei Chesnokov (quarterfinals)
11. (France) Fabrice Santoro (second round)
12. (Germany) Marc-Kevin Goellner (semifinals)
13. (Germany) Bernd Karbacher (third round)
14. (Sweden) Jonas Svensson (second round)
15. (Spain) Carlos Costa (third round)
16. (Sweden) Magnus Gustafsson (champion)

== Draw ==
Key

- Q = Qualifier
- WC = Wild card
- LL = Lucky loser
- Alt = Alternate
- ITF = ITF entry
- PR = Protected ranking
- SR = Special ranking
- SE = Special exempt
- JE = Junior exempt
- JR = Junior Accelerator Programme entrant
- CO = College Accelerator Programme entrant
- NG = Next Gen Accelerator Program entrant
- w/o = Walkover
- r = Retired
- d = Defaulted

=== Finals ===
Quarterfinals
16	(Sweden) Magnus Gustafsson	6	6
9	(South Africa) Marcos Ondruska	3	2
4	(Czech Republic) Karel Nováček	3	2
12	(Germany) Marc-Kevin Goellner	6	6
(Spain) Javier Sánchez	5	6	6^{4}
3	(Ukraine) Andrei Medvedev	7	4	7^{7}
10	(Russia) Andrei Chesnokov	2	5
2	(Germany) Michael Stich	6	7

Semifinals
16	(Sweden) Magnus Gustafsson	6	6
12	(Germany) Marc-Kevin Goellner	4	3
3	(Ukraine) Andrei Medvedev	6	1	4
2	(Germany) Michael Stich	1	6	6

Final
16	(Sweden) Magnus Gustafsson	6	6	3	4	6
2	(Germany) Michael Stich	3	4	6	6	4

=== Top half ===
==== Section 1 ====
First round
(Spain) A Berasategui	6	6
WC	(Germany) M Naewie	2	1
WC	(Germany) C Arriens	6	6
(Germany) D Prinosil	3	2
(Argentina) F Davín	2	6	6
Q	(Germany) D Dier	6	3	4
(Russia) A Cherkasov	6^{3}	6	6^{7}
(Sweden) M Larsson	7^{7}	2	7^{9}

Second round
1	(Spain) S Bruguera	6	4	1
(Spain) A Berasategui	4	6	6
WC	(Germany) C Arriens	4	2
16	(Sweden) M Gustafsson	6	6
9	(South Africa) M Ondruska	7	6
(Argentina) F Davín	5	3
(Sweden) M Larsson	5	4
8	(Spain) E Sánchez	7	6

Third round
(Spain) A Berasategui	6	5	3
16	(Sweden) M Gustafsson	3	7	6
9	(South Africa) M Ondruska	6	6
8	(Spain) E Sánchez	0	3

Quarterfinals
16	(Sweden) M Gustafsson	6	6
9	(South Africa) M Ondruska	3	2

==== Section 2 ====
First round
LL	(Czech Republic) D Rikl	3	4
WC	(Argentina) A Mancini	6	6
(Brazil) J Oncins	5	3
(Spain) T Carbonell	7	6
(Italy) R Furlan	5	3
Q	(Switzerland) C Mezzadri	7	6
(Spain) À Corretja	4	3
(Uruguay) M Filippini	6	6

Second round
4	(Czech Republic) K Nováček	1	6	6
WC	(Argentina) A Mancini	6	4	1
(Spain) T Carbonell	6	6
14	(Sweden) J Svensson	4	4
12	(Germany) MK Goellner	6	6
Q	(Switzerland) C Mezzadri	4	3
(Uruguay) M Filippini	6	2	7
6	(France) C Pioline	3	6	5

Third round
4	(Czech Republic) K Nováček	6	3	7
(Spain) T Carbonell	3	6	5
12	(Germany) MK Goellner	6	3	6
(Uruguay) M Filippini	4	6	2

Quarterfinals
4	(Czech Republic) K Nováček	3	2
12	(Germany) MK Goellner	6	6

=== Bottom half ===
==== Section 3 ====
First round
(Sweden) N Kulti	3	7	2
Q	(Czech Republic) D Vacek	6	5	6
(Russia) A Olhovskiy	3	6	3
(Spain) J Sánchez	6	4	6
(France) G Raoux	6	6
Q	(Latvia) Ģ Dzelde	4	4
(Argentina) H de la Peña	5	3
WC	(Croatia) G Prpić	7	6

Second round
5	(Austria) T Muster	6	3	7^{7}
Q	(Czech Republic) D Vacek	4	6	6^{3}
(Spain) J Sánchez	6	7^{7}
11	(France) F Santoro	2	6^{2}
13	(Germany) B Karbacher	6	4	6
(France) G Raoux	4	6	3
WC	(Croatia) G Prpić	2	4
3	(Ukraine) A Medvedev	6	6

Third round
5	(Austria) T Muster	5	2
(Spain) J Sánchez	7	6
13	(Germany) B Karbacher	3	4
3	(Ukraine) A Medvedev	6	6

Quarterfinals
(Spain) J Sánchez	5	6	6^{4}
3	(Ukraine) A Medvedev	7	4	7^{7}

==== Section 4 ====
First round
(Australia) R Fromberg	4	2
Q	(Germany) K Braasch	6	6
(Spain) F Clavet	6^{3}	6	6
Q	(Germany) M Geserer	7^{7}	2	2
(Spain) J Arrese	0	5
(Argentina) G Markus	6	7
(France) R Gilbert	3	3
(Austria) H Skoff	6	6

Second round
7	(France) A Boetsch	7^{7}	4	7
Q	(Germany) K Braasch	6^{4}	6	5
(Spain) F Clavet	6^{5}	4
10	(Russia) A Chesnokov	7^{7}	6
15	(Spain) C Costa	6	6
(Argentina) G Markus	3	2
(Austria) H Skoff	4	6^{2}
2	(Germany) M Stich	6	7^{7}

Third round
7	(France) A Boetsch	3	1
10	(Russia) A Chesnokov	6	6
15	(Spain) C Costa	4	6	4
2	(Germany) M Stich	6	1	6

Quarterfinals
10	(Russia) A Chesnokov	2	5
2	(Germany) M Stich	6	7
