= 1997 Mercedes Cup =

- Date: 14–20 July
- Edition: 49th
- Category: Championship Series
- Draw: 48S / 24D
- Prize money: $915,000
- Surface: Clay / outdoor
- Location: Stuttgart, Germany
- Venue: Tennis Club Weissenhof

Champions

Singles
- (Spain) Àlex Corretja

Doubles
- (Brazil) Gustavo Kuerten / (Brazil) Fernando Meligeni
- Stuttgart Open

The 1997 Mercedes Cup was a men's tennis tournament played on outdoor clay courts at the Tennis Club Weissenhof in Stuttgart, Germany, that was part of the Championship Series of the 1997 ATP Tour. It was the 49th edition of the tournament and was held from 14 July until 20 July. Third-seeded Àlex Corretja won the singles title.

== Finals ==
=== Singles ===
(Spain) Àlex Corretja defeated (Slovakia) Karol Kučera, 6–2, 7–5

=== Doubles ===
(Brazil) Gustavo Kuerten / (Brazil) Fernando Meligeni defeated (United States) Donald Johnson / (United States) Francisco Montana, 6–4, 6–4
