= 1997 Mercedes Cup – Singles =

Singles
- 1997 Mercedes Cup

Final
- Champion: (Spain) Àlex Corretja
- Runner-up: (Slovakia) Karol Kučera
- Score: 6–2, 7–5

Details
- Draw: 48 (4WC/6Q/1LL)
- Seeds: 16

Events
Singles	Doubles
- Stuttgart Open

Thomas Muster was the defending champion, but lost in the second round to Albert Portas.

Third-seeded Àlex Corretja won the title, by defeating Karol Kučera 6–2, 7–5 in the final.

== Seeds ==
All seeds received a bye to the second round.

1. (Austria) Thomas Muster (second round)
2. (Russia) Yevgeny Kafelnikov (quarterfinals)
3. (Spain) Àlex Corretja (champion)
4. (Spain) Sergi Bruguera (quarterfinals)
5. (Chile) Marcelo Ríos (third round)
6. (Spain) Carlos Moyá (second round)
7. (Germany) Boris Becker (third round, withdrew)
8. (Brazil) Gustavo Kuerten (third round, retired)
9. (Spain) Albert Costa (semifinals)
10. (Spain) Félix Mantilla (quarterfinals)
11. (Ukraine) Andriy Medvedev (second round)
12. (Spain) Alberto Berasategui (quarterfinals)
13. (United Kingdom) Greg Rusedski (second round)
14. (South Africa) Wayne Ferreira (third round)
15. (Czech Republic) Bohdan Ulihrach (second round)
16. (Switzerland) Marc Rosset (second round)

== Draw ==
Key

- Q = Qualifier
- WC = Wild card
- LL = Lucky loser
- Alt = Alternate
- ITF = ITF entry
- PR = Protected ranking
- SR = Special ranking
- SE = Special exempt
- JE = Junior exempt
- JR = Junior Accelerator Programme entrant
- CO = College Accelerator Programme entrant
- NG = Next Gen Accelerator Program entrant
- w/o = Walkover
- r = Retired
- d = Defaulted

=== Finals ===
Quarterfinals
(Spain) Albert Portas	6	6
10	(Spain) Félix Mantilla	2	4
4	(Spain) Sergi Bruguera	3	6	5
(Slovakia) Karol Kučera	6	2	7
12	(Spain) Alberto Berasategui	4	4
3	(Spain) Àlex Corretja	6	6
9	(Spain) Albert Costa	6	6
2	(Russia) Yevgeny Kafelnikov	4	4

Semifinals
(Spain) Albert Portas	4	3
(Slovakia) Karol Kučera	6	6
3	(Spain) Àlex Corretja	6	6
9	(Spain) Albert Costa	4	4

Final
(Slovakia) Karol Kučera	2	5
3	(Spain) Àlex Corretja	6	7

=== Top half ===
==== Section 1 ====
First round
(Spain) A Portas	5	6	7^{7}
(Norway) C Ruud	7	0	6^{2}
Q	(Bulgaria) O Stanoytchev	3	6	2
(Argentina) H Gumy	6	2	6
Q	(Brazil) F Meligeni	6	6
(Germany) A Rădulescu	1	3
WC	(Germany) J Knippschild	6	4	6
(Czech Republic) M Damm	3	6	4

Second round
1	(Austria) T Muster	4	5
(Spain) A Portas	6	7
(Argentina) H Gumy	7	6
15	(Czech Republic) B Ulihrach	5	2
10	(Spain) F Mantilla	6	6
Q	(Brazil) F Meligeni	4	4
WC	(Germany) J Knippschild	7^{7}	4	4
8	(Brazil) G Kuerten	6^{4}	6	6

Third round
(Spain) A Portas	3	6	7^{7}
(Argentina) H Gumy	6	2	6^{5}
10	(Spain) F Mantilla	4
8	(Brazil) G Kuerten	1^{r}

Quarterfinals
(Spain) A Portas	6	6
10	(Spain) F Mantilla	2	4

==== Section 2 ====
First round
Q	(Germany) B Karbacher	4	1^{r}
WC	(Belgium) F Dewulf	6	0
Q	(Germany) M Sinner	6^{2}	7^{8}	7
(Sweden) T Johansson	7^{7}	6^{6}	5
(Slovakia) K Kučera	1
WC	(Germany) N Kiefer	2^{r}
(Sweden) M Norman	3	6^{4}
(Spain) J Sánchez	6	7^{7}

Second round
4	(Spain) S Bruguera	7^{7}	3	6
WC	(Belgium) F Dewulf	6^{5}	6	1
Q	(Germany) M Sinner	6	0	4
14	(South Africa) W Ferreira	3	6	6
11	(Ukraine) A Medvedev	2	4
(Slovakia) K Kučera	6	6
(Spain) J Sánchez	2	3
5	(Chile) M Ríos	6	6

Third round
4	(Spain) S Bruguera	1	6	7
14	(South Africa) W Ferreira	6	3	5
(Slovakia) K Kučera	6	6
5	(Chile) M Ríos	4	4

Quarterfinals
4	(Spain) S Bruguera	3	6	5
(Slovakia) K Kučera	6	2	7

=== Bottom half ===
==== Section 3 ====
First round
(Morocco) H Arazi	5	6^{4}
LL	(Spain) G Blanco	7	7^{7}
(Italy) R Furlan	3	4
Q	(Spain) F Vicente	6	6
WC	(Germany) D Elsner	3	4
(Sweden) M Larsson	6	6
(Germany) MK Goellner	4	7	1
(United States) R Reneberg	6	5	0^{r}

Second round
6	(Spain) C Moyá	6	6^{3}	5
LL	(Spain) G Blanco	4	7^{7}	7
Q	(Spain) F Vicente	4	2
12	(Spain) A Berasategui	6	6
13	(United Kingdom) G Rusedski	6^{4}	7^{7}	4
(Sweden) M Larsson	7^{7}	6^{2}	6
(Germany) MK Goellner	5	1
3	(Spain) À Corretja	7	6

Third round
LL	(Spain) G Blanco	5	5
12	(Spain) A Berasategui	7	7
(Sweden) M Larsson	6^{4}	4
3	(Spain) À Corretja	7^{7}	6

Quarterfinals
12	(Spain) A Berasategui	4	4
3	(Spain) À Corretja	6	6

==== Section 4 ====
First round
(Czech Republic) J Novák	6^{1}	6	5
(Morocco) K Alami	7^{7}	4	7
Q	(Czech Republic) S Doseděl	7^{7}	6
(Slovakia) D Hrbatý	6^{4}	2
(Sweden) M Gustafsson	3	6	1
(Spain) F Clavet	6	1	6
(France) F Santoro	7^{11}	6
(Uruguay) M Filippini	6^{9}	3

Second round
7	(Germany) B Becker	7^{7}	7^{7}
(Morocco) K Alami	6^{5}	6^{5}
Q	(Czech Republic) S Doseděl	3	5
9	(Spain) A Costa	6	7
16	(Switzerland) M Rosset	5	1
(Spain) F Clavet	7	6
(France) F Santoro	6	3	4
2	(Russia) Y Kafelnikov	2	6	6

Third round
7	(Germany) B Becker
9	(Spain) A Costa	w/o
(Spain) F Clavet	6	3	2
2	(Russia) Y Kafelnikov	4	6	6

Quarterfinals
9	(Spain) A Costa	6	6
2	(Russia) Y Kafelnikov	4	4
