= 1994 Mercedes Cup – Doubles =

Doubles
- 1994 Mercedes Cup

Final
- Champions: (United States) Scott Melville (South Africa) Piet Norval
- Runners-up: (Netherlands) Jacco Eltingh (Netherlands) Paul Haarhuis
- Score: 7–6, 7–5

Details
- Draw: 24 (4WC/1Q)
- Seeds: 8

Events
Singles	Doubles
← 1993 ·	Stuttgart Open	· 1995 →

Tom Nijssen and Cyril Suk were the defending champions, but were forced to withdraw before their quarter-final match against Scott Melville and Piet Norval.

Melville and Norval won the title by defeating Jacco Eltingh and Paul Haarhuis 7–6, 7–5 in the final.

== Seeds ==
All seeds received a bye into the second round.

1. (Netherlands) Jacco Eltingh / (Netherlands) Paul Haarhuis (final)
2. (Netherlands) Tom Nijssen / (Czech Republic) Cyril Suk (quarterfinals, withdrew)
3. (South Africa) David Adams / (Russia) Andrei Olhovskiy (quarterfinals)
4. (Russia) Yevgeny Kafelnikov / (Spain) Javier Sánchez (second round)
5. (Netherlands) Menno Oosting / (Czech Republic) Daniel Vacek (semifinals)
6. (Spain) Sergio Casal / (Spain) Emilio Sánchez (quarterfinals)
7. (United States) Scott Melville / (South Africa) Piet Norval (champions)
8. (South Africa) Gary Muller / (South Africa) Marcos Ondruska (second round)

== Draw ==
=== Key ===
- Q = Qualifier
- WC = Wild card
- LL = Lucky loser
- Alt = Alternate
- ITF = ITF entry
- PR = Protected ranking
- SR = Special ranking
- SE = Special exempt
- JE = Junior exempt
- JR = Junior Accelerator Programme entrant
- CO = College Accelerator Programme entrant
- NG = Next Gen Accelerator Program entrant
- w/o = Walkover
- r = Retired
- d = Defaulted

=== Finals ===
Semifinals
1	(Netherlands) Jacco Eltingh (Netherlands) Paul Haarhuis	4	6	6
5	(Netherlands) Menno Oosting (Czech Republic) Daniel Vacek	6	3	4
(Italy) Diego Nargiso (Germany) Udo Riglewski	6	6	7
7	(United States) Scott Melville (South Africa) Piet Norval	7	4	6

Final
1	(Netherlands) Jacco Eltingh (Netherlands) Paul Haarhuis	6	5
7	(United States) Scott Melville (South Africa) Piet Norval	7	7

=== Top half ===
First round
(Italy) A Gaudenzi (Czech Republic) K Nováček	w/o
WC	(Germany) MK Goellner (Ukraine) A Medvedev
WC	(Austria) T Muster (Germany) CU Steeb	2	6
(Spain) T Carbonell (Spain) F Roig	6	7
(United States) S Cannon (United States) M Keil	6	4	2
WC	(Germany) D Prinosil (Germany) J Renzenbrink	4	6	6
(Australia) J Ireland (United States) J Waite	6	7	6
Q	(Germany) B Karbacher (Germany) M Sinner	7	5	4

Second round
1	(Netherlands) J Eltingh (Netherlands) P Haarhuis	6	6
(Italy) A Gaudenzi (Czech Republic) K Nováček	1	4
(Spain) T Carbonell (Spain) F Roig	6	6
8	(South Africa) G Muller (South Africa) M Ondruska	4	3
3	(South Africa) D Adams (Russia) A Olhovskiy	6	6
WC	(Germany) D Prinosil (Germany) J Renzenbrink	3	3
(Australia) J Ireland (United States) J Waite	6	6	4
5	(Netherlands) M Oosting (Czech Republic) D Vacek	7	3	6

Quarterfinals
1	(Netherlands) J Eltingh (Netherlands) P Haarhuis	6	4	6
(Spain) T Carbonell (Spain) F Roig	4	6	3
3	(South Africa) D Adams (Russia) A Olhovskiy	4	6	4
5	(Netherlands) M Oosting (Czech Republic) D Vacek	6	4	6

Semifinals
1	(Netherlands) J Eltingh (Netherlands) P Haarhuis	4	6	6
5	(Netherlands) M Oosting (Czech Republic) D Vacek	6	3	4

=== Bottom half ===
First round
(Netherlands) T Kempers (Sweden) M Larsson	4	0
(Czech Republic) V Flégl (Australia) A Florent	6	6
(Italy) D Nargiso (Germany) U Riglewski	3	6	6
(Sweden) R Bergh (France) JP Fleurian	6	1	2
(Italy) C Brandi (Italy) F Mordegan	6	7	6
WC	(Iran) M Bahrami (France) H Leconte	7	6	3
(United States) D Johnson (Belgium) L Pimek	6	6	7
(Latvia) Ģ Dzelde (Argentina) R Saad	7	4	6

Second round
6	(Spain) S Casal (Spain) E Sánchez	6	6	6
(Czech Republic) V Flégl (Australia) A Florent	7	3	4
(Italy) D Nargiso (Germany) U Riglewski	6	7	6
4	(Russia) Y Kafelnikov (Spain) J Sánchez	7	5	1
7	(United States) S Melville (South Africa) P Norval	7	6
(Italy) C Brandi (Italy) F Mordegan	6	4
(United States) D Johnson (Belgium) L Pimek	4	6	1
2	(Netherlands) T Nijssen (Czech Republic) C Suk	6	3	6

Quarterfinals
6	(Spain) S Casal (Spain) E Sánchez	4	2
(Italy) D Nargiso (Germany) U Riglewski	6	6
7	(United States) S Melville (South Africa) P Norval	w/o
2	(Netherlands) T Nijssen (Czech Republic) C Suk

Semifinals
(Italy) D Nargiso (Germany) U Riglewski	7	4	6
7	(United States) S Melville (South Africa) P Norval	6	6	7

== Qualifying ==
=== Qualifying seeds ===
1. (Brazil) Otávio Della / (Argentina) Luis Lobo (qualifying competition)
2. (Germany) Bernd Karbacher / (Germany) Martin Sinner (qualified)

=== Qualifiers ===
1. (Germany) Bernd Karbacher / (Germany) Martin Sinner

=== Qualifying draw ===
First round
1	(Brazil) Otávio Della (Argentina) Luis Lobo	6	5	6
(Hungary) Sándor Noszály (Austria) Horst Skoff	4	7	4
(Hungary) Gábor Köves (Hungary) László Markovits	3	7	6
2	(Germany) Bernd Karbacher (Germany) Martin Sinner	6	6	7

Qualifying competition
1	(Brazil) Otávio Della (Argentina) Luis Lobo	6	4
2	(Germany) Bernd Karbacher (Germany) Martin Sinner	7	6
