= 1995 Mercedes Cup – Doubles =

Doubles
- 1995 Mercedes Cup

Final
- Champions: (Spain) Tomás Carbonell (Spain) Francisco Roig
- Runners-up: (South Africa) Ellis Ferreira (Netherlands) Jan Siemerink
- Score: 3–6, 6–3, 6–4

Details
- Draw: 24 (4WC/1Q)
- Seeds: 8

Events
Singles	Doubles
← 1994 ·	Stuttgart Open	· 1996 →

Scott Melville and Piet Norval were the defending champions, but Melville did not compete this year. Norval teamed up with Hendrik-Jan Davids and lost in the semifinals to Ellis Ferreira and Jan Siemerink.

Tomás Carbonell and Francisco Roig won the title by defeating Ferreira and Siemerink 3–6, 6–3, 6–4 in the final.

== Seeds ==
All seeds received a bye to the second round.

1. (Netherlands) Jacco Eltingh / (Netherlands) Paul Haarhuis (second round)
2. (Sweden) Jan Apell / (Sweden) Jonas Björkman (quarterfinals)
3. (Russia) Andrei Olhovskiy / (Netherlands) Menno Oosting (quarterfinals)
4. (South Africa) Lan Bale / (South Africa) John-Laffnie de Jager (second round)
5. (Spain) Tomás Carbonell / (Spain) Francisco Roig (champions)
6. (Netherlands) Hendrik Jan Davids / (South Africa) Piet Norval (semifinals)
7. (Germany) Marc-Kevin Goellner / (Czech Republic) Karel Nováček (second round)
8. (Argentina) Luis Lobo / (Spain) Javier Sánchez (semifinals)

== Draw ==
=== Key ===
- Q = Qualifier
- WC = Wild card
- LL = Lucky loser
- Alt = Alternate
- ITF = ITF entry
- PR = Protected ranking
- SR = Special ranking
- SE = Special exempt
- JE = Junior exempt
- JR = Junior Accelerator Programme entrant
- CO = College Accelerator Programme entrant
- NG = Next Gen Accelerator Program entrant
- w/o = Walkover
- r = Retired
- d = Defaulted

=== Finals ===
Semifinals
(South Africa) Ellis Ferreira (Netherlands) Jan Siemerink	6	6
6	(Netherlands) Hendrik Jan Davids (South Africa) Piet Norval	3	2
5	(Spain) Tomás Carbonell (Spain) Francisco Roig	6	7
8	(Argentina) Luis Lobo (Spain) Javier Sánchez	1	6

Final
(South Africa) Ellis Ferreira (Netherlands) Jan Siemerink	6	3	4
5	(Spain) Tomás Carbonell (Spain) Francisco Roig	3	6	6

=== Top half ===
First round
(South Africa) E Ferreira (Netherlands) J Siemerink	3	6	6
(Australia) J Eagle (Australia) A Florent	6	3	4
(Italy) C Brandi (Italy) A Gaudenzi	5	6
(Netherlands) T Nijssen (Germany) U Riglewski	7	7
(Belgium) L Pimek (South Africa) B Talbot	6	3	6
(United States) F Montana (United States) G Van Emburgh	3	6	2
WC	(Germany) K Braasch (Germany) P Kühnen	6	6
Q	(Spain) F Clavet (Czech Republic) V Flégl	3	2

Second round
1	(Netherlands) J Eltingh (Netherlands) P Haarhuis	6	2
(South Africa) E Ferreira (Netherlands) J Siemerink	7	6
(Netherlands) T Nijssen (Germany) U Riglewski	6	6
7	(Germany) MK Goellner (Czech Republic) K Nováček	2	4
4	(South Africa) L Bale (South Africa) JL de Jager	6	3	4
(Belgium) L Pimek (South Africa) B Talbot	4	6	6
WC	(Germany) K Braasch (Germany) P Kühnen	4	3
6	(Netherlands) HJ Davids (South Africa) P Norval	6	6

Quarterfinals
(South Africa) E Ferreira (Netherlands) J Siemerink	7	6
(Netherlands) T Nijssen (Germany) U Riglewski	6	2
(Belgium) L Pimek (South Africa) B Talbot	5	1
6	(Netherlands) HJ Davids (South Africa) P Norval	7	6

Semifinals
(South Africa) E Ferreira (Netherlands) J Siemerink	6	6
6	(Netherlands) HJ Davids (South Africa) P Norval	3	2

=== Bottom half ===
First round
WC	(Iran) M Bahrami (France) H Leconte	2	6
(Spain) S Casal (Spain) E Sánchez	6	7
(Austria) A Antonitsch (Germany) M Sinner	3	7	3
(United States) M Bauer (United States) M Lucena	6	6	6
(Australia) W Arthurs (United Kingdom) N Broad	4	7	6
WC	(Germany) L Burgsmüller (Germany) CU Steeb	6	6	2
WC	(Spain) A Berasategui (Spain) À Corretja	7	4	2
(Spain) JA Conde (United States) J Waite	6	6	6

Second round
5	(Spain) T Carbonell (Spain) F Roig	6	6
(Spain) S Casal (Spain) E Sánchez	3	4
(United States) M Bauer (United States) M Lucena	4	4
3	(Russia) A Olhovskiy (Netherlands) M Oosting	6	6
8	(Argentina) L Lobo (Spain) J Sánchez	6	6	7
(Australia) W Arthurs (United Kingdom) N Broad	1	7	5
(Spain) JA Conde (United States) J Waite	1	7	1
2	(Sweden) J Apell (Sweden) J Björkman	6	6	6

Quarterfinals
5	(Spain) T Carbonell (Spain) F Roig	7	6
3	(Russia) A Olhovskiy (Netherlands) M Oosting	6	2
8	(Argentina) L Lobo (Spain) J Sánchez	4	6	6
2	(Sweden) J Apell (Sweden) J Björkman	6	3	1

Semifinals
5	(Spain) T Carbonell (Spain) F Roig	6	7
8	(Argentina) L Lobo (Spain) J Sánchez	1	6
