= 1995 Mercedes Cup =

- Date: 17–24 July
- Edition: 18th
- Category: Championship Series
- Draw: 48S / 24D
- Prize money: $915,000
- Surface: Clay / outdoor
- Location: Stuttgart, Germany
- Venue: Tennis Club Weissenhof

Champions

Singles
- (Austria) Thomas Muster

Doubles
- (Spain) Tomás Carbonell / (Spain) Francisco Roig
- Stuttgart Open

The 1995 Mercedes Cup was a men's tennis tournament played on outdoor clay courts and held at the Tennis Club Weissenhof in Stuttgart, Germany that was part of the 1995 ATP Tour. It was the 18th edition of the tournament and was held from 17 July until 24 July 1995. First-seeded Thomas Muster won the singles title.

== Finals ==
=== Singles ===
(Austria) Thomas Muster defeated (Sweden) Jan Apell, 6–2, 6–2

- It was Muster's 8th singles title of the year and the 31st of his career.

=== Doubles ===
(Spain) Tomás Carbonell / (Spain) Francisco Roig defeated (South Africa) Ellis Ferreira / (Netherlands) Jan Siemerink, 3–6, 6–3, 6–4
