= Petra Winzenhöller =

German tennis player

- Country (sports): Germany
- Born: 11 March 1972 (age 54)
- Prize money: $47,518

Singles
- Career titles: 1 ITF
- Highest ranking: No. 139 (6 March 1995)

Grand Slam singles results
- Wimbledon: Q1 (1995)
- US Open: Q1 (1995)

Doubles
- Career titles: 3 ITF
- Highest ranking: No. 233 (19 February 1996)

Petra Winzenhöller (born 11 March 1972) is a German former professional tennis player.

Winzenhöller reached a career high singles ranking of 139 in the world, while competing on the professional tour in the 1990s. She won a $75,000 ITF tournament in Plovdiv in 1994, despite starting in the qualifying draw.

A naturopath and physiotherapist, Winzenhöller has worked in that capacity with the Germany Fed Cup team and has also toured as part of Andrea Petkovic's personal team.

== ITF finals ==
$75,000 tournaments
$10,000 tournaments

=== Singles: 2 (1–1) ===
Result	No.	Date	Tournament	Surface	Opponent	Score
Win	1.	8 August 1994	Plovdiv, Bulgaria	Clay	(Germany) Veronika Martinek	6–4, 6–0
Loss	1.	27 May 1996	Istanbul, Turkey	Hard	(United Kingdom) Emily Bond	6–1, 3–6, 1–6

=== Doubles: 6 (3–3) ===
Result	No.	Date	Tournament	Surface	Partner	Opponents	Score
Win	1.	24 August 1992	Gryfino, Poland	Clay	(Poland) Isabela Listowska	(Czechoslovakia) Miroslava Kočí (Czechoslovakia) Zuzana Nemšáková	7–6^{(2)}, 6–7^{(5)}, 7–5
Loss	1.	12 October 1992	Burgdorf, Switzerland	Carpet	(Poland) Isabela Listowska	(Australia) Nicole Pratt (Australia) Kristin Godridge	3–6, 0–6
Loss	2.	23 November 1992	Bangkok, Thailand	Hard	(Poland) Isabela Listowska	(South Korea) Kim Ih-sook (South Korea) Pyo Hye-jeong	6–4, 3–6, 4–6
Loss	3.	28 February 1994	Buchen, Germany	Carpet	(Poland) Isabela Listowska	(Netherlands) Caroline Stassen (Netherlands) Anique Snijders	4–6, 4–6
Win	2.	7 March 1994	Offenbach, Germany	Carpet	(Germany) Sandra Wächtershäuser	(Japan) Yuka Yoshida (Japan) Hiroko Mochizuki	7–6, 6–3
Win	3.	28 March 1994	Marsa, Malta	Clay	(Poland) Isabela Listowska	(Czech Republic) Ivana Havrlíková (Namibia) Elizma Nortje	7–6^{(5)}, 6–3
