= 1996 Mercedes Cup – Singles =

Singles
- 1996 Mercedes Cup
- 1995 Champion: (Austria) Thomas Muster

Final
- Champion: (Austria) Thomas Muster
- Runner-up: (Russia) Yevgeny Kafelnikov
- Score: 6–2, 6–2, 6–4

Details
- Draw: 48
- Seeds: 16

Events
| Singles | Doubles |
- Stuttgart Open

First-seeded Thomas Muster was the defending champion and won in the final 6–2, 6–2, 6–4 against Yevgeny Kafelnikov.

== Seeds ==
A champion seed is indicated in bold text while text in italics indicates the round in which that seed was eliminated. All sixteen seeds received a bye to the second round.

1. (Austria) **Thomas Muster (champion)**
2. (Russia) Yevgeny Kafelnikov (final)
3. (Chile) Marcelo Ríos (second round)
4. (Sweden) Stefan Edberg (third round)
5. (Spain) Carlos Moyá (third round)
6. (Spain) Alberto Berasategui (semifinals)
7. (Spain) Félix Mantilla (quarterfinals)
8. (Spain) Francisco Clavet (quarterfinals)
9. (Germany) Bernd Karbacher (second round)
10. (Sweden) Magnus Gustafsson (third round)
11. (Czech Republic) Bohdan Ulihrach (third round)
12. (Spain) Àlex Corretja (semifinals)
13. (Ukraine) Andriy Medvedev (second round)
14. (Argentina) Hernán Gumy (second round)
15. (Czech Republic) Jiří Novák (second round)
16. (Sweden) Mikael Tillström (third round)

== Draw ==
Key

- Q = Qualifier
- WC = Wild card
- LL = Lucky loser
- Alt = Alternate
- ITF = ITF entry
- PR = Protected ranking
- SR = Special ranking
- SE = Special exempt
- JE = Junior exempt
- JR = Junior Accelerator Programme entrant
- CO = College Accelerator Programme entrant
- NG = Next Gen Accelerator Program entrant
- w/o = Walkover
- r = Retired
- d = Defaulted

=== Finals ===
Semifinals
1 | (Austria) **Thomas Muster** | **6** | **6**
6 | (Spain) Alberto Berasategui | 3 | 3
12 | (Spain) Àlex Corretja | 3 | 6^{4}
2 | (Russia) **Yevgeny Kafelnikov** | **6** | **7^{7}**

Final
1 | (Austria) **Thomas Muster** | **6** | **6** | **6**
2 | (Russia) Yevgeny Kafelnikov | 2 | 2 | 4

=== Top half ===
==== Section 1 ====
First round
Q | (France) O Delaître | 4 | 4
Q | (Spain) **M A Górriz** | **6** | **6**
(Morocco) Y El Aynaoui | 4 | **7^{7}** | 4
(Spain) **G Blanco** | **6** | 6^{0} | **6**
WC | (Germany) K Braasch | 4 | **6** | 4
(Belgium) **F Dewulf** | **6** | 4 | **6**
(Spain) T Carbonell | 3 | 4
Q | (Hungary) **J Krocsko** | **6** | **6**

Second round
1 | (Austria) **T Muster** | **7^{7}** | **7^{7}**
Q | (Spain) M A Gorriz | 6^{5} | 6^{2}
(Spain) **G Blanco** | **6** | 5 | **6**
15 | (Czech Republic) J Novák | 3 | **7** | 4
10 | (Sweden) **M Gustafsson** | **6** | **6**
(Belgium) F Dewulf | 1 | 3
Q | (Hungary) J Krocsko | 4 | 4
8 | (Spain) **F Clavet** | **6** | **6**

Third round
1 | (Austria) **T Muster** | **6** | **6**
(Spain) G Blanco | 3 | 0
10 | (Sweden) M Gustafsson | 3 | 1
8 | (Spain) **F Clavet** | **6** | **6**

Quarterfinals
1 | (Austria) **T Muster** | **6** | **6**
8 | (Spain) F Clavet | 2 | 4

==== Section 2 ====
First round
(Germany) **M-K Goellner** | **6** | **7^{8}**
WC | (Russia) A Cherkasov | 3 | 6^{6}
Q | (Spain) G López | **7^{7}** | 2 | 2
(Czech Republic) **D Rikl** | 6^{4} | **6** | **6**
(Czech Republic) **C Doseděl** | **7** | 6^{5} | **6**
Q | (Argentina) F Squillari | 5 | **7^{7}** | 3
(Germany) C-U Steeb | 6^{5} | 4
(Spain) **S Bruguera** | **7^{7}** | **6**

Second round
3 | (Chile) M Ríos | 0 | 6^{5}
(Germany) **M-K Goellner** | **6** | **7^{7}**
(Czech Republic) **D Rikl** | **7** | **6**
14 | (Argentina) H Gumy | 5 | 1
11 | (Czech Republic) **B Ulihrach** | **6** | 5 | **7^{8}**
(Czech Republic) C Doseděl | 2 | **7** | 6^{6}
(Spain) S Bruguera | 6^{6} | **6** | 3
6 | (Spain) **A Berasategui** | **7^{8}** | 4 | **6**

Third round
(Germany) **M-K Goellner** | **6** | **6**
(Czech Republic) D Rikl | 0 | 3
11 | (Czech Republic) B Ulihrach | **7^{7}** | 1 | 1
6 | (Spain) **A Berasategui** | 6^{5} | **6** | **6**

Quarterfinals
(Germany) M-K Goellner | 4 | 2
6 | (Spain) **A Berasategui** | **6** | **6**

=== Bottom half ===
==== Section 3 ====
First round
(Spain) J Burillo | 5 | 3
(Netherlands) **S Schalken** | **7** | **6**
(France) J Golmard | 3 | 2
(Germany) **H Dreekmann** | **6** | **6**
(Russia) **A Volkov** | **7^{7}** | **6**
WC | (Germany) J Knippschild | 6^{5} | 4
WC | (Germany) N Kiefer | 3 | 1
(Norway) **C Ruud** | **6** | **6**

Second round
5 | (Spain) **C Moyá** | **6** | **6**
(Netherlands) S Schalken | 3 | 2
(Germany) H Dreekmann | **7** | 2 | 4
12 | (Spain) **À Corretja** | 5 | **6** | **6**
13 | (Ukraine) A Medvedev | 3 | **7^{8}** | 4
(Russia) **A Volkov** | **6** | 6^{6} | **6**
(Norway) C Ruud | 4 | 3
4 | (Sweden) **S Edberg** | **6** | **6**

Third round
5 | (Spain) C Moyá | 4 | 3
12 | (Spain) **À Corretja** | **6** | **6**
(Russia) **A Volkov** | 2 | **6** | **6**
4 | (Sweden) S Edberg | **6** | 4 | 3

Quarterfinals
12 | (Spain) **À Corretja** | **6** | **6**
(Russia) A Volkov | 4 | 3

==== Section 4 ====
First round
(Spain) J Sánchez | 4 | 4
(Uruguay) **M Filippini** | **6** | **6**
(Romania) A Voinea | 4 | **6** | 2
(Sweden) **M Larsson** | **6** | 3 | **6**
(Russia) **A Chesnokov** | **6** | 6^{8} | **6**
(Brazil) F Meligeni | 3 | **7^{10}** | 3
Q | (Brazil) **G Kuerten** | **7^{7}** | 3 | **6**
(Germany) L Burgsmüller | 6^{2} | **6** | 3

Second round
7 | (Spain) **F Mantilla** | **6** | 0 | **6**
(Uruguay) M Filippini | 3 | **6** | 4
(Sweden) **M Larsson** | **6** | **7^{7}**
9 | (Germany) B Karbacher | 2 | 6^{5}
16 | (Sweden) **M Tillström** | **6** | **6**
(Russia) A Chesnokov | 3 | 3
Q | (Brazil) G Kuerten | 1 | 4
2 | (Russia) **Y Kafelnikov** | **6** | **6**

Third round
7 | (Spain) **F Mantilla** | 5 | **6** | **7**
(Sweden) M Larsson | **7** | 4 | 5
16 | (Sweden) M Tillström | 3 | 6^{5}
2 | (Russia) **Y Kafelnikov** | **6** | **7^{7}**

Quarterfinals
7 | (Spain) F Mantilla | **6** | 0 | 2
2 | (Russia) **Y Kafelnikov** | 2 | **6** | **6**
