= 1995 Mercedes Cup – Singles =

Singles
- 1995 Mercedes Cup

Final
- Champion: (Austria) Thomas Muster
- Runner-up: (Sweden) Jan Apell
- Score: 6–2, 6–2

Details
- Draw: 48 (4WC/6Q/1LL)
- Seeds: 16

Events
Singles	Doubles
- Stuttgart Open

Alberto Berasategui was the defending champion, but lost in the second round to Óscar Martínez.

First-seeded Thomas Muster won the title by defeating Jan Apell 6–2, 6–2 in the final.

== Seeds ==
All seeds received a bye to the second round.

1. (Austria) Thomas Muster (champion)
2. (n/a)
3. (Spain) Sergi Bruguera (semifinals)
4. (Spain) Alberto Berasategui (second round)
5. (Ukraine) Andrei Medvedev (second round)
6. (Italy) Andrea Gaudenzi (second round)
7. (Netherlands) Jacco Eltingh (second round)
8. (Spain) Àlex Corretja (second round)
9. (Netherlands) Paul Haarhuis (second round)
10. (Sweden) Jonas Björkman (second round)
11. (Czech Republic) Karel Nováček (third round)
12. (Spain) Francisco Clavet (second round)
13. (Spain) Albert Costa (quarterfinals)
14. (Austria) Gilbert Schaller (third round)
15. (Germany) Bernd Karbacher (third round)
16. (France) Fabrice Santoro (second round, retired)

== Draw ==
Key

- Q = Qualifier
- WC = Wild card
- LL = Lucky loser
- Alt = Alternate
- ITF = ITF entry
- PR = Protected ranking
- SR = Special ranking
- SE = Special exempt
- JE = Junior exempt
- JR = Junior Accelerator Programme entrant
- CO = College Accelerator Programme entrant
- NG = Next Gen Accelerator Program entrant
- w/o = Walkover
- r = Retired
- d = Defaulted

=== Finals ===
Quarterfinals
1	(Austria) Thomas Muster	6	6
(Spain) Tomás Carbonell	2	0
3	(Spain) Sergi Bruguera	6	6
WC	(Germany) Carl-Uwe Steeb	3	4
(France) Arnaud Boetsch	4	6	6
13	(Spain) Albert Costa	6	3	4
(Sweden) Jan Apell	6	3	6
(Sweden) Magnus Gustafsson	3	6	3

Semifinals
1	(Austria) Thomas Muster	6^{5}	7^{7}	6
3	(Spain) Sergi Bruguera	7^{7}	6^{5}	2
(France) Arnaud Boetsch	2	4
(Sweden) Jan Apell	6	6

Final
1	(Austria) Thomas Muster	6	6
(Sweden) Jan Apell	2	2

=== Top half ===
==== Section 1 ====
First round
(Chile) M Ríos	6	6
(Spain) J Sánchez	2	2
(Germany) M Sinner	6	6
WC	(Germany) K Braasch	3	4
(Netherlands) J Siemerink	2	6	2
(Spain) T Carbonell	6	3	6
(Spain) C Costa	6^{3}	7	7^{10}
(Brazil) F Meligeni	7^{7}	5	6^{8}

Second round
1	(Austria) T Muster	6	6
(Chile) M Ríos	2	4
(Germany) M Sinner	1	1
15	(Germany) B Karbacher	6	6
9	(Netherlands) P Haarhuis	4	6	2
(Spain) T Carbonell	6	4	6
(Spain) C Costa	6	6
7	(Netherlands) J Eltingh	4	2

Third round
1	(Austria) T Muster	6	6
15	(Germany) B Karbacher	4	2
(Spain) T Carbonell	6	6
(Spain) C Costa	3	2

Quarterfinals
1	(Austria) T Muster	6	6
(Spain) T Carbonell	2	0

==== Section 2 ====
First round
(Peru) J Yzaga	7^{8}	7^{7}
Q	(Netherlands) HJ Davids	6^{6}	6^{3}
(Czech Republic) B Ulihrach	4	7^{7}	7^{8}
(Spain) E Sánchez	6	6^{5}	6^{6}
WC	(Germany) CU Steeb	6	6
Q	(France) JP Fleurian	2	1
(Germany) MK Goellner	6	6
Q	(South Africa) E Ferreira	3	4

Second round
3	(Spain) S Bruguera	6	6
(Peru) J Yzaga	4	3
(Czech Republic) B Ulihrach	4	2
14	(Austria) G Schaller	6	6
12	(Spain) F Clavet	4	7^{7}	2
WC	(Germany) CU Steeb	6	6^{5}	6
(Germany) MK Goellner	4	6	6
6	(Italy) A Gaudenzi	6	3	2

Third round
3	(Spain) S Bruguera	6	6
14	(Austria) G Schaller	1	1
WC	(Germany) CU Steeb	7	6
(Germany) MK Goellner	5	2

Quarterfinals
3	(Spain) S Bruguera	6	6
WC	(Germany) CU Steeb	3	4

=== Bottom half ===
==== Section 3 ====
First round
(Slovakia) K Kučera	3	2
(France) A Boetsch	6	6
(Italy) R Furlan	6	4	6
Q	(Croatia) S Hiršzon	3	6	4
(Russia) A Chesnokov	3	6	6
WC	(Germany) P Kühnen	6	4	4
(Spain) Ó Martínez	6	2	6
Q	(United States) B Behrens	2	6	4

Second round
5	(Ukraine) A Medvedev	6	1	4
(France) A Boetsch	1	6	6
(Italy) R Furlan	3	6	4
11	(Czech Republic) K Nováček	6	3	6
13	(Spain) A Costa	6	7^{7}
(Russia) A Chesnokov	2	6^{4}
(Spain) Ó Martínez	7^{7}	7^{8}
4	(Spain) A Berasategui	6^{1}	6^{6}

Third round
(France) A Boetsch	6	5	7
11	(Czech Republic) K Nováček	4	7	5
13	(Spain) A Costa	6	6
(Spain) Ó Martínez	2	4

Quarterfinals
(France) A Boetsch	4	6	6
13	(Spain) A Costa	6	3	4

==== Section 4 ====
First round
WC	(France) H Leconte	3	6	5
(Sweden) J Apell	6	3	7
(Czech Republic) S Doseděl	6	6
(Russia) A Olhovskiy	3	1
(Uruguay) M Filippini	6	1
Q	(Austria) A Antonitsch	1	0^{r}
(France) L Roux	3	5
(Sweden) M Gustafsson	6	7

Second round
8	(Spain) À Corretja	6	4	3
(Sweden) J Apell	2	6	6
(Czech Republic) S Doseděl	6	6
10	(Sweden) J Björkman	3	2
16	(France) F Santoro	0	0^{r}
(Uruguay) M Filippini	6	3
(Sweden) M Gustafsson	6	6
LL	(France) T Guardiola	3	4

Third round
(Sweden) J Apell	6	2	6
(Czech Republic) S Doseděl	3	6	3
(Uruguay) M Filippini	4	6	1
(Sweden) M Gustafsson	6	1	6

Quarterfinals
(Sweden) J Apell	6	3	6
(Sweden) M Gustafsson	3	6	3
