= 1993 Mercedes Cup – Doubles =

Doubles
- 1993 Mercedes Cup

Final
- Champions: (Netherlands) Tom Nijssen (Czech Republic) Cyril Suk
- Runners-up: (South Africa) Gary Muller (South Africa) Piet Norval
- Score: 7–6, 6–3

Details
- Draw: 24 (3WC/1Q/1LL)
- Seeds: 8

Events
| Singles | Doubles |
| ← 1992 · | Stuttgart Open | · 1994 → |

Glenn Layendecker and Byron Talbot were the defending champions, but none competed this year. Layendecker retired from professional tennis at the end of the 1992 season, while Talbot opted to compete at Washington, D.C. during the same week.

Tom Nijssen and Cyril Suk won the title by defeating Gary Muller and Piet Norval 7–6, 6–3 in the final.

== Seeds ==
All seeds received a bye to the second round.

1. (Spain) Sergio Casal / (Spain) Emilio Sánchez (semifinals)
2. (United States) Luke Jensen / (United States) Murphy Jensen (semifinals)
3. (Netherlands) Tom Nijssen / (Czech Republic) Cyril Suk (champions)
4. (United States) Shelby Cannon / (United States) Scott Melville (quarterfinals)
5. (South Africa) Gary Muller / (South Africa) Piet Norval (final)
6. (United States) Mike Bauer / (Germany) Marc-Kevin Goellner (second round)
7. (Netherlands) Menno Oosting / (Germany) Udo Riglewski (quarterfinals)
8. (South Africa) John-Laffnie de Jager / (South Africa) Marcos Ondruska (quarterfinals)

== Draw ==
=== Key ===
- Q = Qualifier
- WC = Wild card
- LL = Lucky loser
- Alt = Alternate
- ITF = ITF entry
- PR = Protected ranking
- SR = Special ranking
- SE = Special exempt
- JE = Junior exempt
- JR = Junior Accelerator Programme entrant
- CO = College Accelerator Programme entrant
- NG = Next Gen Accelerator Program entrant
- w/o = Walkover
- r = Retired
- d = Defaulted

=== Finals ===
Semifinals
1 | (Spain) Sergio Casal (Spain) Emilio Sánchez | 3 | 4
3 | (Netherlands) Tom Nijssen (Czech Republic) Cyril Suk | 6 | 6
5 | (South Africa) Gary Muller (South Africa) Piet Norval | 6 | 6
2 | (United States) Luke Jensen (United States) Murphy Jensen | 4 | 3

Final
3 | (Netherlands) Tom Nijssen (Czech Republic) Cyril Suk | 7 | 6
5 | (South Africa) Gary Muller (South Africa) Piet Norval | 6 | 3

=== Top half ===
First round
(Czech Republic) D Rikl (Czech Republic) D Vacek | 6 | 6 | 6
(Czech Republic) V Flégl (Denmark) M Mortensen | 1 | 7 | 4
(Netherlands) S Groen (Belgium) L Pimek | 6 | 6 | 1
(Argentina) P Albano (Spain) F Roig | 4 | 7 | 6
(Italy) C Brandi (Brazil) J Oncins | 6 | 6
(Argentina) H de la Peña (Mexico) J Lozano | 3 | 3
(Australia) J Ireland (United States) D Johnson | 2 | 5
LL | (United States) B Devening (Latvia) Ģ Dzelde | 6 | 7

Second round
1 | (Spain) S Casal (Spain) E Sánchez | 6 | 6 | 7
(Czech Republic) D Rikl (Czech Republic) D Vacek | 2 | 7 | 6
(Argentina) P Albano (Spain) F Roig | 6 | 3 | 4
7 | (Netherlands) M Oosting (Germany) U Riglewski | 4 | 6 | 6
3 | (Netherlands) T Nijssen (Czech Republic) C Suk | 6 | 6 | 6
(Italy) C Brandi (Brazil) J Oncins | 7 | 3 | 4
LL | (United States) B Devening (Latvia) Ģ Dzelde | 3 | 6 | 6
6 | (United States) M Bauer (Germany) MK Goellner | 6 | 3 | 2

Quarterfinals
1 | (Spain) S Casal (Spain) E Sánchez | 4 | 7 | 6
7 | (Netherlands) M Oosting (Germany) U Riglewski | 6 | 6 | 4
3 | (Netherlands) T Nijssen (Czech Republic) C Suk | 6 | 6
LL | (United States) B Devening (Latvia) Ģ Dzelde | 3 | 3

Semifinals
1 | (Spain) S Casal (Spain) E Sánchez | 3 | 4
3 | (Netherlands) T Nijssen (Czech Republic) C Suk | 6 | 6

=== Bottom half ===
First round
WC | (Spain) F Clavet (Germany) M Naewie | 6 | 6 | 2
WC | (Germany) B Karbacher (Germany) D Prinosil | 3 | 7 | 6
(Sweden) J Apell (Sweden) J Donar | 6 | 6 | 6
WC | (Iran) M Bahrami (Austria) T Muster | 7 | 4 | 3
(Spain) J Burillo (Spain) J Sánchez | 1 | 4
(Spain) T Carbonell (Spain) C Costa | 6 | 6
Q | (Russia) A Cherkasov (Russia) A Chesnokov | 6 | 6 | 6
(Ukraine) A Medvedev (Russia) A Olhovskiy | 7 | 1 | 4

Second round
5 | (South Africa) G Muller (South Africa) P Norval | 5 | 7 | 6
WC | (Germany) B Karbacher (Germany) D Prinosil | 7 | 6 | 2
(Sweden) J Apell (Sweden) J Donar | 4 | 6 | 1
4 | (United States) S Cannon (United States) S Melville | 6 | 3 | 6
8 | (South Africa) JL de Jager (South Africa) M Ondruska | 3 | 6 | 6
(Spain) T Carbonell (Spain) C Costa | 6 | 2 | 3
Q | (Russia) A Cherkasov (Russia) A Chesnokov
2 | (United States) L Jensen (United States) M Jensen | w/o

Quarterfinals
5 | (South Africa) G Muller (South Africa) P Norval | 6 | 6 | 6
(United States) S Cannon (United States) S Melville | 7 | 4 | 4
8 | (South Africa) JL de Jager (South Africa) M Ondruska | 7 | 5 | 3
2 | (United States) L Jensen (United States) M Jensen | 6 | 7 | 6

Semifinals
5 | (South Africa) G Muller (South Africa) P Norval | 6 | 6
2 | (United States) L Jensen (United States) M Jensen | 4 | 3
