= 1994 Mercedes Cup =

- Date: 18–25 July
- Edition: 17th
- Category: Championship Series
- Draw: 48S / 24D
- Prize money: $915,000
- Surface: Clay / outdoor
- Location: Stuttgart, Germany
- Venue: Tennis Club Weissenhof

Champions

Singles
- (Spain) Alberto Berasategui

Doubles
- (United States) Scott Melville / (South Africa) Piet Norval
- Stuttgart Open

The 1994 Mercedes Cup, was a men's tennis tournament played on outdoor clay courts and held at the Tennis Club Weissenhof in Stuttgart, Germany that was part of the Championship Series of the 1994 ATP Tour. It was the 17th edition of the tournament was held from 18 July until 25 July 1994. Fourth-seeded Alberto Berasategui won the singles title.

== Finals ==
=== Singles ===
(Spain) Alberto Berasategui defeated (Italy) Andrea Gaudenzi, 7–5, 6–3, 7–6^{(7–5)}

- It was Berasategui's second singles title of the year and 3rd of his career.

=== Doubles ===
(United States) Scott Melville / (South Africa) Piet Norval defeated (Netherlands) Jacco Eltingh / (Netherlands) Paul Haarhuis, 7–6, 7–5
