= 1993 Mercedes Cup =

- Date: 19–25 July
- Edition: 16th
- Category: Championship Series
- Draw: 48S / 24D
- Prize money: $915,000
- Surface: Clay / outdoor
- Location: Stuttgart, Germany
- Venue: Tennis Club Weissenhof

Champions

Singles
- (Sweden) Magnus Gustafsson

Doubles
- (Netherlands) Tom Nijssen / (Czechoslovakia) Cyril Suk
- Stuttgart Open

The 1993 Mercedes Cup, was a men's tennis tournament played on outdoor clay courts and held at the Tennis Club Weissenhof in Stuttgart, Germany that was part of the Championship Series of the 1993 ATP Tour. It was the 16th edition of the tournament was held from 19 July until 25 July 1993. Sixteenth-seeded Magnus Gustafsson won the singles title.

== Finals ==
=== Singles ===
(Sweden) Magnus Gustafsson defeated (Germany) Michael Stich, 6–3, 6–4, 3–6, 4–6, 6–4

- It was Gustafsson's 1st singles title of the year and 5th of his career.

=== Doubles ===
(Netherlands) Tom Nijssen / (Czechoslovakia) Cyril Suk defeated (South Africa) Gary Muller / (South Africa) Piet Norval, 7–6, 6–3
