= 1996 Mercedes Cup =

- Date: 15–21 July
- Edition: 20th
- Category: Championship Series
- Draw: 48S / 24D
- Prize money: $915,000
- Surface: Clay / outdoor
- Location: Stuttgart, Germany
- Venue: Tennis Club Weissenhof

Champions

Singles
- (Austria) Thomas Muster

Doubles
- (Belgium) Libor Pimek / (South Africa) Byron Talbot
- Stuttgart Open

The 1996 Mercedes Cup was a men's tennis tournament played on outdoor clay courts at the Tennis Club Weissenhof in Stuttgart, Germany that was part of the Championship Series of the 1996 ATP Tour. It was the 20th edition of the tournament and was held from 15 July until 21 July 1996. Thomas Muster won the singles title.

== Finals ==
=== Singles ===
(Austria) Thomas Muster defeated (Russia) Yevgeny Kafelnikov 6–2, 6–2, 6–4

- It was Muster's 6th singles title of the year and the 41st of his career.

=== Doubles ===
(Belgium) Libor Pimek / (South Africa) Byron Talbot defeated (Spain) Tomás Carbonell / (Spain) Francisco Roig 6–2, 5–7, 6–4

- It was Pimek's 3rd title of the year and the 16th of his career. It was Talbot's 2nd title of the year and the 5th of his career.
