= 1997 Mercedes Cup – Doubles =

Doubles
- 1997 Mercedes Cup

Final
- Champions: (Brazil) Gustavo Kuerten (Brazil) Fernando Meligeni
- Runners-up: (United States) Donald Johnson (United States) Francisco Montana
- Score: 6–4, 6–4

Details
- Draw: 24 (3WC/1Q/2LL)
- Seeds: 8

Events
| Singles | Doubles |
| ← 1996 · | Stuttgart Open | · 1998 → |

Libor Pimek and Byron Talbot were the defending champions, but lost in the second round to tournament winners Gustavo Kuerten and Fernando Meligeni.

Gustavo Kuerten and Fernando Meligeni won the title by defeating Donald Johnson and Francisco Montana 6–4, 6–4 in the final.

== Seeds ==
All seeds received a bye to the second round.

1. (Russia) Yevgeny Kafelnikov / (Russia) Andrei Olhovskiy (quarterfinals)
2. (Argentina) Luis Lobo / (Spain) Javier Sánchez (semifinals)
3. (United Kingdom) Neil Broad / (South Africa) Piet Norval (second round)
4. (n/a)
5. (South Africa) David Adams / (Netherlands) Menno Oosting (quarterfinals)
6. (United States) Donald Johnson / (United States) Francisco Montana (final)
7. (Belgium) Libor Pimek / (South Africa) Byron Talbot (second round)
8. (United States) Trevor Kronemann / (Australia) David Macpherson (quarterfinals)

== Draw ==
=== Key ===
- Q = Qualifier
- WC = Wild card
- LL = Lucky loser
- Alt = Alternate
- SE = Special exempt
- PR = Protected ranking
- ITF = ITF entry
- JE = Junior exempt
- w/o = Walkover
- r = Retired
- d = Defaulted
- SR = Special ranking

=== Finals ===
Semifinals
(Brazil) Gustavo Kuerten (Brazil) Fernando Meligeni | 6 | 6
WC | (Spain) Alberto Berasategui (Spain) Alberto Martín | 0 | 3
6 | (United States) Donald Johnson (United States) Francisco Montana | 6 | 6
2 | (Argentina) Luis Lobo (Spain) Javier Sánchez | 4 | 4

Final
(Brazil) Gustavo Kuerten (Brazil) Fernando Meligeni | 6 | 6
6 | (United States) Donald Johnson (United States) Francisco Montana | 4 | 4

=== Top half ===
First round
(Czech Republic) J Novák (Czech Republic) D Rikl | 6 | 3
(Australia) A Kratzmann (United States) J Waite | 7 | 6
(Brazil) G Kuerten (Brazil) F Meligeni | 7 | 7
(Netherlands) T Kempers (Australia) P Kilderry | 6 | 6
WC | (Spain) A Berasategui (Spain) A Martín | 4 | 7 | 6
Q | (United States) M Keil (Brazil) J Oncins | 6 | 6 | 3
WC | (Slovakia) D Hrbatý (Slovakia) K Kučera | 0 | 6 | 4
(Argentina) P Albano (Spain) À Corretja | 6 | 2 | 6

Second round
1 | (Russia) Y Kafelnikov (Russia) A Olhovskiy | 6 | 6
(Australia) A Kratzmann (United States) J Waite | 4 | 3
(Brazil) G Kuerten (Brazil) F Meligeni | 6 | 6
7 | (Belgium) L Pimek (South Africa) B Talbot | 2 | 4
LL | (South Africa) JL de Jager (United States) S Melville | 2 | 1
WC | (Spain) A Berasategui (Spain) A Martín | 6 | 6
(Argentina) P Albano (Spain) À Corretja | 4 | 3
5 | (South Africa) D Adams (Netherlands) M Oosting | 6 | 6

Quarterfinals
1 | (Russia) Y Kafelnikov (Russia) A Olhovskiy | 2 | 7 | 1
(Brazil) G Kuerten (Brazil) F Meligeni | 6 | 6 | 6
WC | (Spain) A Berasategui (Spain) A Martín | 6 | 3 | 7
5 | (South Africa) D Adams (Netherlands) M Oosting | 4 | 6 | 5

Semifinals
(Brazil) G Kuerten (Brazil) F Meligeni | 6 | 6
WC | (Spain) A Berasategui (Spain) A Martín | 0 | 3

=== Bottom half ===
First round
(Czech Republic) S Doseděl (Czech Republic) P Vízner | 7 | 6
(Netherlands) S Groen (Croatia) S Hiršzon | 6 | 1
LL | (Spain) E Benfele Álvarez (Spain) A Portas | 4 | 4
(Federal Republic of Yugoslavia) N Đorđević (South Africa) P Rosner | 6 | 6
(Netherlands) T Nijssen (Netherlands) S Noteboom | 2 | 6
WC | (Sweden) J Apell (South Africa) W Ferreira | 6 | 7
(Argentina) L Arnold Ker (Argentina) D Orsanic | 2 | 7 | 6
(Italy) C Brandi (France) F Santoro | 6 | 5 | 4

Second round
6 | (United States) D Johnson (United States) F Montana | 6 | 3 | 7
(Czech Republic) S Doseděl (Czech Republic) P Vízner | 3 | 6 | 6
(Federal Republic of Yugoslavia) N Đorđević (South Africa) P Rosner | 6 | 6
3 | (United Kingdom) N Broad (South Africa) P Norval | 4 | 2
8 | (United States) T Kronemann (Australia) D Macpherson | 6 | 6 | 6
WC | (Sweden) J Apell (South Africa) W Ferreira | 3 | 7 | 1
(Argentina) L Arnold Ker (Argentina) D Orsanic | 3 | 6 | 5
2 | (Argentina) L Lobo (Spain) J Sánchez | 6 | 1 | 7

Quarterfinals
6 | (United States) D Johnson (United States) F Montana | 6 | 6
(Federal Republic of Yugoslavia) N Đorđević (South Africa) P Rosner | 2 | 1
8 | (United States) T Kronemann (Australia) D Macpherson | 6 | 3 | 4
2 | (Argentina) L Lobo (Spain) J Sánchez | 4 | 6 | 6

Semifinals
6 | (United States) D Johnson (United States) F Montana | 6 | 6
2 | (Argentina) L Lobo (Spain) J Sánchez | 4 | 4
