= Gonzalo López-Fabero =

Spanish tennis player and coach

- Country (sports): Spain
- Born: 29 May 1970 (age 54); Barcelona, Spain
- Height: 6 ft 3 in (191 cm)
- Plays: Right-handed
- Prize money: $16,506

Singles
- Highest ranking: No. 169 (1 May 1995)

Grand Slam singles results
- Wimbledon: Q1 (1994, 1995)
- French Open Junior: 2R (1988)

Doubles
- Career record: 0-1
- Highest ranking: No. 458 (1 May 1995)

Grand Slam doubles results
- French Open Junior: 2R (1988)
- Wimbledon Junior: 1R (1988)

Gonzalo López-Fabero (born 29 May 1970) is a Spanish tennis coach and former professional player.

A right-handed player from Barcelona, López-Fabero reached a career high ranking of 169 in the world.

López-Fabero twice competed in the qualifying draws at Wimbledon and in 1994 won a Challenger tournament in Seville, beating Paolo Canè in the final. His only ATP Tour main draw appearance came in the doubles at the 1994 Croatia Open, where he partnered with Juan Albert Viloca.

Since 1998 has worked in tennis coaching and has been the personal coach of several players, including Julián Alonso, Teymuraz Gabashvili, Evgeny Donskoy and Jesse Levine.

== Challenger titles ==
=== Singles: (1) ===
Year	Tournament	Surface	Opponent	Score
1994	Seville, Spain	Clay	(Italy) Paolo Canè	6–4, 7–6
