= Jodi Richardson =

Australian tennis player

- Country (sports): Australia
- Born: 12 August 1977 (age 47)
- Height: 5 ft 9 in (175 cm)
- Plays: Right-handed

Singles
- Highest ranking: No. 596 (20 February 1995)

Grand Slam singles results
- Australian Open: Q1 (1995)

Doubles
- Highest ranking: No. 587 (12 June 1995)

Jodi Richardson (born 12 August 1977) is an Australian former professional tennis player.

A right-handed player from Canberra, Richardson was a member of Australia's Junior Fed Cup winning team in 1993 and was a junior doubles runner-up at the 1995 Wimbledon Championships. She made her WTA Tour main draw debut in the doubles at the 1996 Acura Classic in Manhattan Beach, before turning away from professional tennis to play at college level in the United States for the BYU Cougars.
