= Juan Carlos Bianchi =

Venezuelan tennis player (born 1970)

- Country (sports): Venezuela
- Born: January 22, 1970 (age 55); Caracas, Venezuela
- Prize money: $24,075

Singles
- Career record: 0–2
- Highest ranking: No. 384 (19 September 1994)

Doubles
- Career record: 0–4
- Highest ranking: No. 171 (6 May 1996)

Other doubles tournaments
- Olympic Games: 1R (1996)

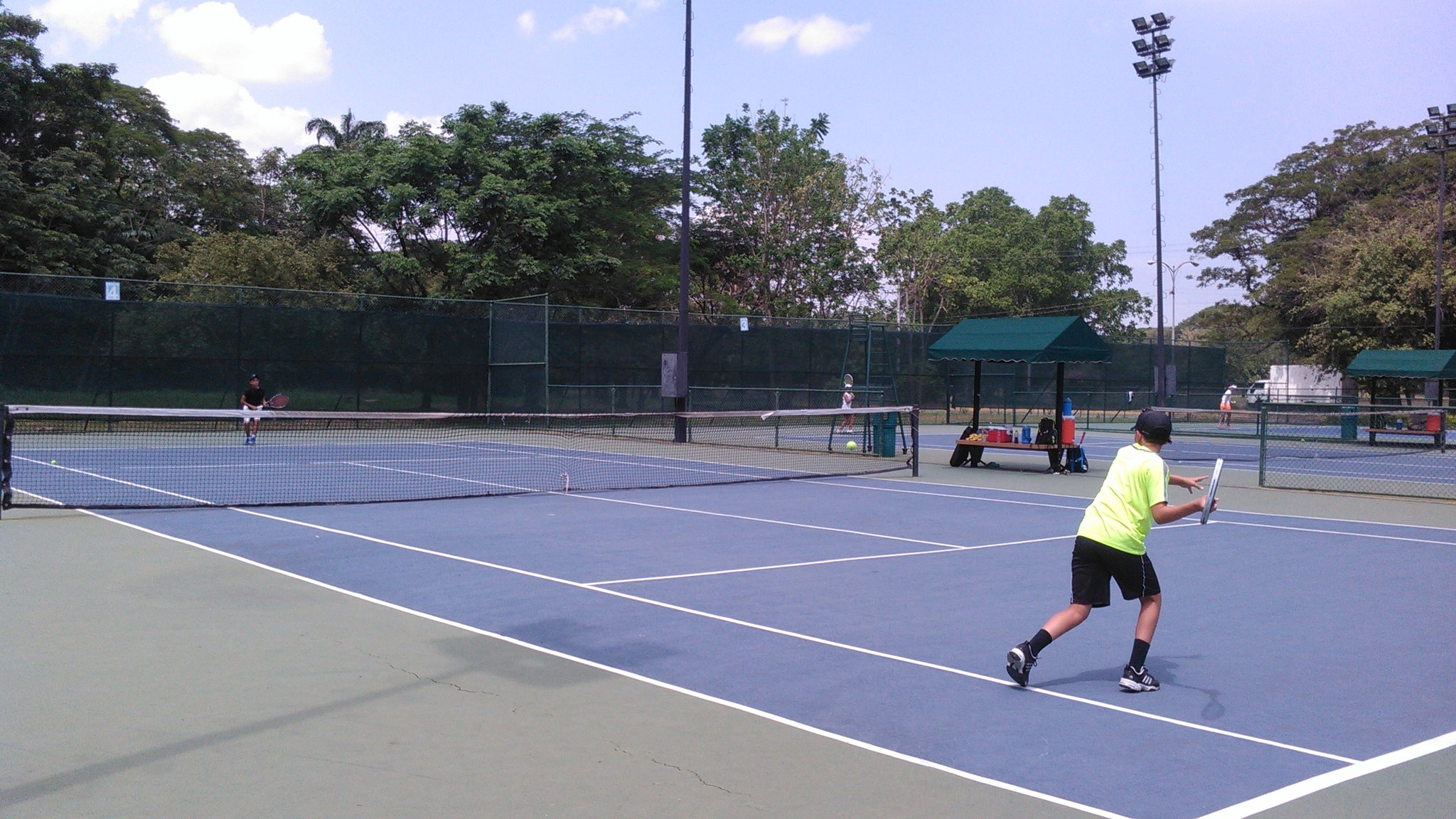
Juan Carlos Bianchi Tennis Complex, Maracay.

Juan Carlos Bianchi (born 22 January 1970) is a former tennis player from Venezuela, who represented his native country at the 1996 Summer Olympics in Atlanta, Georgia and played collegiate tennis at the University of Alabama for the Alabama Crimson Tide. Partnering with Nicolas Pereira at the Olympic Games, he was defeated in the first round of the doubles competition. The right-hander reached his highest singles ATP-ranking on September 19, 1994, when he became the number 384 of the world.
