= 1995 Wimbledon Championships – Girls' doubles =

Girls' doubles
- 1995 Wimbledon Championships

Final
- Champions: (Zimbabwe) Cara Black (Poland) Aleksandra Olsza
- Runners-up: (Australia) Trudi Musgrave (Australia) Jodi Richardson
- Score: 6–0, 7–6^{(7–5)}

Events
Singles	men	women		boys	girls
Doubles	men	women	mixed	boys	girls
WC Singles	men	women	quad
WC Doubles	men	women	quad
Legends	men	women	seniors
← 1994 ·	Wimbledon Championships	· 1996 →

Cara Black and Aleksandra Olsza defeated Trudi Musgrave and Jodi Richardson in the final, 6–0, 7–6^{(7–5)} to win the girls' doubles tennis title at the 1995 Wimbledon Championships.

== Seeds ==
1. (United States) Corina Morariu / (San Marino) Ludmila Varmužová (semifinals)
2. (Belarus) Olga Barabanschikova / (Italy) Alice Canepa (second round)
3. (Zimbabwe) Cara Black / (Poland) Aleksandra Olsza (champions)
4. (Australia) Trudi Musgrave / (Australia) Jodi Richardson (final)
5. (Australia) Siobhan Drake-Brockman / (Australia) Annabel Ellwood (quarterfinals)
6. n/a
7. (Peru) Déborah Gaviria / (Spain) Paula Hermida (first round)
8. (France) Amélie Cocheteux / (France) Amélie Mauresmo (quarterfinals)

== Draw ==
=== Key ===
- Q = Qualifier
- WC = Wild card
- LL = Lucky loser
- Alt = Alternate
- SE = Special exempt
- PR = Protected ranking
- ITF = ITF entry
- JE = Junior exempt
- w/o = Walkover
- r = Retired
- d = Defaulted
- SR = Special ranking

=== Finals ===
Semifinals
1	(United States) Corina Morariu (San Marino) Ludmila Varmužová	6	4
3	(Zimbabwe) Cara Black (Poland) Aleksandra Olsza	7	6
4	(Australia) Trudi Musgrave (Australia) Jodi Richardson	6	6
(United States) Amanda Basica (United States) Samantha Reeves	3	0

Final
3	(Zimbabwe) Cara Black (Poland) Aleksandra Olsza	6	7^{7}
4	(Australia) Trudi Musgrave (Australia) Jodi Richardson	0	6^{5}

=== Top half ===
First round
1	(United States) Corina Morariu (San Marino) Ludmila Varmužová	6	6
(Mexico) Mercedes del Valle Prieto (Peru) María Eugenia Rojas	0	0
(Russia) Anna Kournikova (Hungary) Petra Mandula	4	6	6
(Belarus) Tatiana Poutchek (Tunisia) Selima Sfar	6	1	4
(South Korea) Jeon Mi-ra (Thailand) Tamarine Tanasugarn	6	4	4
(Hungary) Katalin Marosi (South Africa) Jessica Steck	1	6	6
(Romania) Alice Pirsu (Romania) Raluca Sandu	6	6
7	(Peru) Déborah Gaviria (Spain) Paula Hermida	1	4
3	(Zimbabwe) Cara Black (Poland) Aleksandra Olsza	7	6
(Slovakia) Ľudmila Cervanová (Indonesia) Wynne Prakusya	6	3
(Mexico) Karen Goldstein (Croatia) Ana Radeljević	0	4
(Hungary) Kira Nagy (Switzerland) Patty Schnyder	6	6
(Czech Republic) Denisa Chládková (Austria) Barbara Schwartz	6	6
(United Kingdom) Megan Miller (India) Aarthi Venkatesan	0	2
(Czech Republic) Michaela Paštiková (Czech Republic) Jitka Schönfeldová	w/o
8	(France) Amélie Cocheteux (France) Amélie Mauresmo

Second round
1	(United States) C Morariu (San Marino) L Varmužová	6	5	6
(Russia) A Kournikova (Hungary) P Mandula	4	7	4
(Hungary) K Marosi (South Africa) J Steck	6	6
(Romania) A Pirsu (Romania) R Sandu	0	1
3	(Zimbabwe) C Black (Poland) A Olsza	6	2	6
(Hungary) K Nagy (Switzerland) P Schnyder	2	6	2
(Czech Republic) D Chládková (Austria) B Schwartz	6	0
8	(France) A Cocheteux (France) A Mauresmo	7	6

Quarterfinals
1	(United States) C Morariu (San Marino) L Varmužová	6	6
(Hungary) K Marosi (South Africa) J Steck	4	4
3	(Zimbabwe) C Black (Poland) A Olsza	3	6	6
8	(France) A Cocheteux (France) A Mauresmo	6	1	4

Semifinals
1	(United States) C Morariu (San Marino) L Varmužová	6	4
3	(Zimbabwe) C Black (Poland) A Olsza	7	6

=== Bottom half ===
First round
(Netherlands) Yvette Basting (South Africa) Surina de Beer	w/o
(United Kingdom) Frances Hearn (United Kingdom) Zoe Mellis
(Japan) Haruka Inoue (Japan) Saori Obata	2	0
(United States) Stephanie Halsell (United States) Lilia Osterloh	6	6
WC	(United Kingdom) Fiona Lishman (United Kingdom) Abigail Tordoff	6	2
(United Kingdom) Jasmine Choudhury (United Kingdom) Leyla Ogan	7	6
(United Kingdom) Tabitha Blackburn (South Africa) Carmen Madden	1	0
4	(Australia) Trudi Musgrave (Australia) Jodi Richardson	6	6
5	(Australia) Siobhan Drake-Brockman (Australia) Annabel Ellwood	7	6
(Indonesia) Liza Andriyani (South Africa) Giselle Swart	5	3
(France) Amélie Castéra (France) Nathalie Dechy	6	6
WC	(United Kingdom) Laura Austin (United Kingdom) Libby Fletcher	2	1
(United States) Amanda Basica (United States) Samantha Reeves	6	6
(United Kingdom) Tilly Callow (United Kingdom) Jheni Osman	3	1
(Malaysia) Khoo Chin-bee (Chinese Taipei) Weng Tzu-ting	4	4
2	(Belarus) Olga Barabanschikova (Italy) Alice Canepa	6	6

Second round
(United Kingdom) F Hearn (United Kingdom) Z Mellis	4	3
(United States) S Halsell (United States) L Osterloh	6	6
(United Kingdom) J Choudhury (United Kingdom) L Ogan	1	2
4	(Australia) T Musgrave (Australia) J Richardson	6	6
5	(Australia) S Drake-Brockman (Australia) A Ellwood	6	2	6
(France) A Castéra (France) N Dechy	3	6	4
(United States) A Basica (United States) S Reeves	6	6
2	(Belarus) O Barabanschikova (Italy) A Canepa	3	4

Quarterfinals
(United States) S Halsell (United States) L Osterloh	2	3
4	(Australia) T Musgrave (Australia) J Richardson	6	6
5	(Australia) S Drake-Brockman (Australia) A Ellwood	2	7	5
(United States) A Basica (United States) S Reeves	6	5	7

Semifinals
4	(Australia) T Musgrave (Australia) J Richardson	6	6
(United States) A Basica (United States) S Reeves	3	0
