= 1989 French Open – Women's doubles =

Women's doubles
- 1989 French Open

Final
- Champion: (Soviet Union) Larisa Savchenko (Soviet Union) Natasha Zvereva
- Runner-up: (West Germany) Steffi Graf (Argentina) Gabriela Sabatini
- Score: 6–4, 6–4

Details
- Draw: 64 (4 WC )
- Seeds: 16

Events
Singles	men	women		boys	girls
Doubles	men	women	mixed	boys	girls
WC Singles	men	women	quad
WC Doubles	men	women	quad
Legends	−45	45+	women
← 1988 ·	French Open	· 1990 →

Larisa Savchenko and Natasha Zvereva defeated Steffi Graf and Gabriela Sabatini in the final, 6–4, 6–4 to win the women's doubles tennis title at the 1989 French Open. It was Graf and Sabatini's third runner-up finish at the event.

Martina Navratilova and Pam Shriver were the two-time reigning champions, but did not participate this year.

== Seeds ==
1. (Czechoslovakia) Jana Novotná / (Czechoslovakia) Helena Suková (semifinals)
2. (Soviet Union) Larisa Savchenko / (Soviet Union) Natasha Zvereva (champions)
3. (West Germany) Steffi Graf / (Argentina) Gabriela Sabatini (final)
4. (United States) Gigi Fernández / (United States) Lori McNeil (second round)
5. (United States) Katrina Adams / (United States) Zina Garrison (quarterfinals)
6. (United States) Betsy Nagelsen / (Australia) Janine Tremelling (first round)
7. (Australia) Jenny Byrne / (Australia) Elizabeth Smylie (first round)
8. (United States) Elise Burgin / (Australia) Hana Mandlíková (third round)
9. (Netherlands) Manon Bollegraf / (West Germany) Eva Pfaff (second round)
10. (France) Isabelle Demongeot / (France) Nathalie Tauziat (third round)
11. (United Kingdom) Jo Durie / (United States) Mary Joe Fernández (second round)
12. (Denmark) Tine Scheuer-Larsen / (France) Catherine Tanvier (quarterfinals)
13. (United States) Beth Herr / (United States) Candy Reynolds (third round)
14. (West Germany) Claudia Kohde-Kilsch / (West Germany) Claudia Porwik (first round)
15. (Australia) Nicole Provis / (South Africa) Elna Reinach (third round)
16. (United States) Terry Phelps / (Italy) Raffaella Reggi (third round)

== Draw ==
=== Key ===
- Q = Qualifier
- WC = Wild card
- LL = Lucky loser
- Alt = Alternate
- SE = Special exempt
- PR = Protected ranking
- ITF = ITF entry
- JE = Junior exempt
- w/o = Walkover
- r = Retired
- d = Defaulted
- SR = Special ranking

=== Finals ===
Quarterfinals
1	(Czechoslovakia) Jana Novotná (Czechoslovakia) Helena Suková	6	7
(Spain) Arantxa Sánchez Vicario (Austria) Judith Wiesner	1	6^{3}
3	(West Germany) Steffi Graf (Argentina) Gabriela Sabatini	7	6
12	(Denmark) Tine Scheuer-Larsen (France) Catherine Tanvier	6^{4}	3
5	(United States) Katrina Adams (United States) Zina Garrison	6	6^{4}	4
(Netherlands) Brenda Schultz (Hungary) Andrea Temesvári	2	7	6
(Canada) Helen Kelesi (France) Catherine Suire	2	3
2	(Soviet Union) Larisa Savchenko (Soviet Union) Natasha Zvereva	6	6

Semifinals
1	(Czechoslovakia) Jana Novotná (Czechoslovakia) Helena Suková	1	2
3	(West Germany) Steffi Graf (Argentina) Gabriela Sabatini	6	6
(Netherlands) Brenda Schultz (Hungary) Andrea Temesvári	1	4
2	(Soviet Union) Larisa Savchenko (Soviet Union) Natasha Zvereva	6	6

Final
3	(West Germany) Steffi Graf (Argentina) Gabriela Sabatini	4	4
2	(Soviet Union) Larisa Savchenko (Soviet Union) Natasha Zvereva	6	6

=== Top half ===
==== Section 1 ====
First round
1	(Czechoslovakia) J Novotná (Czechoslovakia) H Suková	6	6
(Socialist Federal Republic of Yugoslavia) S Goleš (Argentina) M Paz	3	1
(Italy) L Ferrando (Argentina) P Tarabini	6^{3}	6	6
(United States) E Hakami (United States) S Stafford	7	1	0
(United States) C Benjamin (South Africa) D Van Rensburg	6	6
(Spain) R Bielsa (Soviet Union) E Maniokova	1	2
WC	(France) P Etchemendy (France) N Guerrée	3	6^{1}
9	(Netherlands) M Bollegraf (West Germany) E Pfaff	6	7
14	(West Germany) C Kohde-Kilsch (West Germany) C Porwik	6	3	4
(France) S Amiach (France) N Herreman	2	6	6
(Spain) A Sánchez Vicario (Austria) J Wiesner	7	4	6
(Italy) S Cecchini (Peru) L Gildemeister	5	6	4
(Australia) A Minter (New Zealand) J Richardson	4	6	7
(United States) S Collins (Soviet Union) L Meskhi	6	1	5
(South Africa) L Gregory (United States) G Magers	6	6
6	(United States) B Nagelsen (Australia) J Tremelling	4	3

Second round
1	(Czechoslovakia) J Novotná (Czechoslovakia) H Suková	4	6	6
(Italy) L Ferrando (Argentina) P Tarabini	6	1	2
(United States) C Benjamin (South Africa) D Van Rensburg	6	4	6
9	(Netherlands) M Bollegraf (West Germany) E Pfaff	1	6	4
(France) S Amiach (France) N Herreman	6	2	2
(Spain) A Sánchez Vicario (Austria) J Wiesner	4	6	6
(Australia) A Minter (New Zealand) J Richardson	5	6	1
(South Africa) L Gregory (United States) G Magers	7	3	6

Third round
1	(Czechoslovakia) J Novotná (Czechoslovakia) H Suková	6	6
9	(United States) C Benjamin (South Africa) D Van Rensburg	2	1
(Spain) A Sánchez Vicario (Austria) J Wiesner	6	6
(South Africa) L Gregory (United States) G Magers	3	4

Quarterfinals
1	(Czechoslovakia) J Novotná (Czechoslovakia) H Suková	6	7
(Spain) A Sánchez Vicario (Austria) J Wiesner	1	6^{3}

==== Section 2 ====
First round
3	(West Germany) S Graf (Argentina) G Sabatini	6	6
(Hong Kong) P Hy (United Kingdom) C Wood	3	4
(South Africa) A Coetzer (United States) K Steinmetz	7	6^{5}	3
(Argentina) B Fulco (Argentina) A Villagrán	6^{3}	7	6
WC	(France) S Niox-Château (France) K Quentrec	5	2
(United States) P Barg (United States) R Reis	7	6
(Czechoslovakia) I Budařová (Czechoslovakia) R Rajchrtová	6^{3}	5
15	(Australia) N Provis (South Africa) E Reinach	7	7
12	(Denmark) T Scheuer-Larsen (France) C Tanvier	6^{4}	6	6
(United States) D Faber (United States) M Werdel	7	2	3
(Switzerland) C Cohen (Switzerland) M Strebel	1	5
(United States) Ca MacGregor (United States) S Walsh-Pete	6	7
(United States) L Allen (United States) B Bowes	3	6	6
(Austria) B Paulus (Czechoslovakia) R Zrubáková	6	3	1
WC	(France) M Laval (France) N van Lottum	2	4
8	(United States) E Burgin (Australia) H Mandlíková	6	6

Second round
3	(West Germany) S Graf (Argentina) G Sabatini	4	6	6
(Argentina) B Fulco (Argentina) A Villagrán	6	1	3
(United States) P Barg (United States) R Reis	4	2
15	(Australia) N Provis (South Africa) E Reinach	6	6
12	(Denmark) T Scheuer-Larsen (France) C Tanvier	6	4
(United States) Ca MacGregor (United States) S Walsh-Pete	2	6	3
(United States) L Allen (United States) B Bowes	3	3
8	(United States) E Burgin (Australia) H Mandlíková	6	6

Third round
3	(West Germany) S Graf (Argentina) G Sabatini	5	6	6
(Australia) N Provis (South Africa) E Reinach	7	2	4
12	(Denmark) T Scheuer-Larsen (France) C Tanvier	6	6
8	(United States) E Burgin (Australia) H Mandlíková	3	3

Quarterfinals
(West Germany) S Graf (Argentina) G Sabatini	6	6
12	(Denmark) T Scheuer-Larsen (France) C Tanvier	3	3

=== Bottom half ===
==== Section 3 ====
First round
5	(United States) K Adams (United States) Z Garrison	6	6
(West Germany) S Frankl (Netherlands) A van Buuren	1	2
(West Germany) I Cueto (West Germany) S Meier	7	2	2
WC	(France) J Halard (Belgium) S Wasserman	6^{4}	6	6
(Austria) H Sprung (Argentina) A Tiezzi	4	6	6
(Czechoslovakia) R Maršíková (West Germany) C Schneider	6	4	2
(United States) M Norwood (United States) J Thomas	5	1
10	(France) I Demongeot (France) N Tauziat	7	6
13	(United States) B Herr (United States) C Reynolds	6	6
(Japan) K Ito (Japan) Y Kajita	1	2
(Australia) T Morton (Australia) L O'Neill	1	7	1
(United States) J Smoller (Sweden) M Strandlund	6	5	6
(Finland) N Dahlman (Brazil) N Dias	3	2
(Netherlands) B Schultz (Hungary) A Temesvári	6	6
(Poland) I Kuczyńska (Czechoslovakia) J Pospíšilová	4	2
4	(United States) G Fernández (United States) L McNeil	6	6

Second round
5	(United States) K Adams (United States) Z Garrison	6	4	6
WC	(France) J Halard (Belgium) S Wasserman	4	6	3
(Austria) H Sprung (Argentina) A Tiezzi	3	1
10	(France) I Demongeot (France) N Tauziat	6	6
13	(United States) B Herr (United States) C Reynolds	6	6
(United States) J Smoller (Sweden) M Strandlund	4	2
(Netherlands) B Schultz (Hungary) A Temesvári	4	6	7
4	(United States) G Fernández (United States) L McNeil	6	2	5

Third round
5	(United States) K Adams (United States) Z Garrison	3	6	8
10	(France) I Demongeot (France) N Tauziat	6	4	6
13	(United States) B Herr (United States) C Reynolds	6	2	4
(Netherlands) B Schultz (Hungary) A Temesvári	4	6	6

Quarterfinals
5	(United States) K Adams (United States) Z Garrison	6	6^{4}	4
(Netherlands) B Schultz (Hungary) A Temesvári	2	7	6

==== Section 4 ====
First round
7	(Australia) J Byrne (Australia) E Smylie	2	6	5
(Italy) S La Fratta (Italy) B Romanò	6	4	7
(Belgium) A Devries (United States) A Grossman	1	6	6
(Canada) H Kelesi (France) C Suire	6	1	8
(Australia) L Field (Czechoslovakia) D Krajčovičová	5	3
(Bulgaria) K Maleeva (Bulgaria) Man Maleeva	7	6
(France) A Dechaume (France) E Derly	4	6	3
16	(United States) T Phelps (Italy) R Reggi	6	4	6
11	(United Kingdom) J Durie (United States) MJ Fernández	6	6
(Czechoslovakia) P Langrová (West Germany) W Probst	0	1
(Australia) JA Faull (Australia) R McQuillan	6	6
(Australia) M Jaggard (Japan) A Nishiya	0	4
(United States) A Frazier (Australia) K Radford	4	0
(Netherlands) C Bakkum (Netherlands) N Jagerman	6	6
(South Africa) L Barnard (South Africa) K Schimper	2	0
2	(Soviet Union) L Savchenko (Soviet Union) N Zvereva	6	6

Second round
(Italy) S La Fratta (Italy) B Romanò	3	2
(Canada) H Kelesi (France) C Suire	6	6
(Bulgaria) K Maleeva (Bulgaria) Man Maleeva	5	2
16	(United States) T Phelps (Italy) R Reggi	7	6
11	(United Kingdom) J Durie (United States) MJ Fernández	6^{4}	5
(Australia) JA Faull (Australia) R McQuillan	7	7
(Netherlands) C Bakkum (Netherlands) N Jagerman	5	4
2	(Soviet Union) L Savchenko (Soviet Union) N Zvereva	7	6

Third round
(Canada) H Kelesi (France) C Suire	6	6
16	(United States) T Phelps (Italy) R Reggi	4	0
(Australia) JA Faull (Australia) R McQuillan	4	2
2	(Soviet Union) L Savchenko (Soviet Union) N Zvereva	6	6

Quarterfinals
(Canada) H Kelesi (France) C Suire	2	3
2	(Soviet Union) L Savchenko (Soviet Union) N Zvereva	6	6
