= 1992 French Open – Women's doubles =

Women's doubles
- 1992 French Open

Final
- Champion: (United States) Gigi Fernández (Commonwealth of Independent States) Natasha Zvereva
- Runner-up: (Spain) Conchita Martínez (Spain) Arantxa Sánchez Vicario
- Score: 6–3, 6–2

Details
- Draw: 64 (4 WC )
- Seeds: 16

Events
Singles	men	women		boys	girls
Doubles	men	women	mixed	boys	girls
WC Singles	men	women	quad
WC Doubles	men	women	quad
Legends	−45	45+	women
← 1991 ·	French Open	· 1993 →

Gigi Fernández and Jana Novotná were the defending champions, but participated with different partners in this tournament. Novotná played alongside Larisa Neiland, and lost in the semifinals to Conchita Martínez and Arantxa Sánchez Vicario.

Gigi Fernández played alongside Natasha Zvereva, and successfully defended the title, defeating Martínez and Sánchez Vicario in the final 6–3, 6–2. This was Fernández and Zvereva's first Grand Slam Doubles title as partners; they would go on to win 14 Grand Slam titles, completing the Career Grand Slam together.

== Seeds ==
1. (Czechoslovakia) Jana Novotná / (Latvia) Larisa Neiland (semifinals)
2. (United States) Gigi Fernández / (Commonwealth of Independent States) Natasha Zvereva (champions)
3. (United States) Mary Joe Fernández / (United States) Zina Garrison-Jackson (first round)
4. (Spain) Conchita Martínez / (Spain) Arantxa Sánchez Vicario (final)
5. (United States) Katrina Adams / (Netherlands) Manon Bollegraf (quarterfinals)
6. (United States) Lori McNeil / (Australia) Nicole Provis (quarterfinals)
7. (United States) Sandy Collins / (South Africa) Elna Reinach (third round)
8. (United States) Jill Hetherington / (United States) Kathy Rinaldi (third round)
9. (United States) Patty Fendick / (Czechoslovakia) Andrea Strnadová (second round)
10. (Commonwealth of Independent States) Leila Meskhi / (Argentina) Mercedes Paz (first round)
11. (South Africa) Rosalyn Fairbank-Nideffer / (Italy) Raffaella Reggi (third round)
12. (Belgium) Sabine Appelmans / (Germany) Claudia Porwik (third round)
13. (France) Isabelle Demongeot / (France) Nathalie Tauziat (quarterfinals)
14. (France) Mary Pierce / (Argentina) Patricia Tarabini (quarterfinals)
15. (Bulgaria) Katerina Maleeva / (Germany) Barbara Rittner (third round)
16. (Germany) Claudia Kohde-Kilsch / (Austria) Judith Wiesner (first round)

== Draw ==
=== Key ===
- Q = Qualifier
- WC = Wild card
- LL = Lucky loser
- Alt = Alternate
- SE = Special exempt
- PR = Protected ranking
- ITF = ITF entry
- JE = Junior exempt
- w/o = Walkover
- r = Retired
- d = Defaulted
- SR = Special ranking

=== Finals ===
Quarterfinals
1	(Czechoslovakia) Jana Novotná (Latvia) Larisa Neiland	6	6
14	(France) Mary Pierce (Argentina) Patricia Tarabini	3	4
4	(Spain) Conchita Martínez (Spain) Arantxa Sánchez Vicario	6	6
6	(United States) Lori McNeil (Australia) Nicole Provis	3	4
(Germany) Steffi Graf (Germany) Anke Huber	6	6
13	(France) Isabelle Demongeot (France) Nathalie Tauziat	4	1
5	(United States) Katrina Adams (Netherlands) Manon Bollegraf	3	4
2	(United States) Gigi Fernández (Commonwealth of Independent States) Natasha Zvereva	6	6

Semifinals
1	(Czechoslovakia) Jana Novotná (Latvia) Larisa Neiland	3	2
4	(Spain) Conchita Martínez (Spain) Arantxa Sánchez Vicario	6	6
(Germany) Steffi Graf (Germany) Anke Huber	0	1
2	(United States) Gigi Fernández (Commonwealth of Independent States) Natasha Zvereva	6	6

Final
4	(Spain) Conchita Martínez (Spain) Arantxa Sánchez Vicario	3	2
2	(United States) Gigi Fernández (Commonwealth of Independent States) Natasha Zvereva	6	6

=== Top half ===
==== Section 1 ====
First round
1	(Czechoslovakia) J Novotná (Latvia) L Neiland	6	6
(Czechoslovakia) A Noháčová (Czechoslovakia) R Rajchrtová	1	1
(Australia) J-A Faull (New Zealand) J Richardson	6	3	4
(Spain) A Segura (Spain) J Souto	1	6	6
(Japan) K Date (Japan) M Kidowaki	1	5
(Netherlands) N Muns-Jagerman (Netherlands) B Schultz	6	7
(United States) L Harvey-Wild (Australia) R Stubbs	6	6
10	(Commonwealth of Independent States) L Meskhi (Argentina) M Paz	1	2
14	(France) M Pierce (Argentina) P Tarabini	6	6
(United States) C Benjamin (United States) J Santrock	4	1
(Argentina) B Fulco (Canada) R Simpson-Alter	2	1
(Netherlands) M Kiene (Netherlands) M Oremans	6	6
(Sweden) C Lindqvist (Sweden) M Lindström	6	7^{11}
(Czechoslovakia) P Langrová (Czechoslovakia) R Zrubáková	4	6^{9}
WC	(France) P Etchemendy (France) S Sabas	2	0
7	(United States) S Collins (South Africa) E Reinach	6	6

Second round
1	(Czechoslovakia) J Novotná (Latvia) L Neiland	6	6
(Spain) A Segura (Spain) J Souto	2	0
(Netherlands) N Muns-Jagerman (Netherlands) B Schultz	6	6^{6}	4
(United States) L Harvey-Wild (Australia) R Stubbs	4	7^{8}	6
14	(France) M Pierce (Argentina) P Tarabini	7^{7}	6
(Netherlands) M Kiene (Netherlands) M Oremans	6^{4}	3
(Czechoslovakia) P Langrová (Czechoslovakia) R Zrubáková	4	6	4
7	(United States) S Collins (South Africa) E Reinach	6	4	6

Third round
1	(Czechoslovakia) J Novotná (Latvia) L Neiland	6	7
(United States) L Harvey-Wild (Australia) R Stubbs	4	6^{3}
14	(France) M Pierce (Argentina) P Tarabini	3	6	6
7	(United States) S Collins (South Africa) E Reinach	6	3	1

Quarterfinals
1	(Czechoslovakia) J Novotná (Latvia) L Neiland	6	6
14	(France) M Pierce (Argentina) P Tarabini	3	4

==== Section 2 ====
First round
4	(Spain) C Martínez (Spain) A Sánchez Vicario	6	6
(Italy) S Cecchini (Peru) L Gildemeister	2	1
(Commonwealth of Independent States) E Brioukhovets (Commonwealth of Independent States) N Medvedeva	6	6
(Czechoslovakia) R Bobková (Spain) V Ruano Pascual	2	2
(Czechoslovakia) K Habšudová (United States) J Smoller	2	1
(United States) A May (United States) K Po	6	6
(Italy) S Farina (Italy) L Ferrando	4	2
12	(Belgium) S Appelmans (Germany) C Porwik	6	6
16	(Germany) C Kohde-Kilsch (Austria) J Wiesner	0	1^{r}
(Netherlands) I Driehuis (France) N van Lottum	6	2
WC	(France) N Housset (France) S Niox-Chateu	4	4
(United States) L Glitz (United States) C Kuhlman	6	6
(United States) J Fuchs (Sweden) M Strandlund	7^{7}	5	11
(Germany) K Kschwendt (Argentina) F Labat	6^{3}	7	13
(Switzerland) C Caverzasio (France) N Herreman	1	1
6	(United States) L McNeil (Australia) N Provis	6	6

Second round
4	(Spain) C Martínez (Spain) A Sánchez Vicario	6	6
(Commonwealth of Independent States) E Brioukhovets (Commonwealth of Independent States) N Medvedeva	1	1
(United States) A May (United States) K Po	2	3
12	(Belgium) S Appelmans (Germany) C Porwik	6	6
(Netherlands) I Driehuis (France) N van Lottum	6	6
(United States) L Glitz (United States) C Kuhlman	2	1
(Germany) K Kschwendt (Argentina) F Labat	2	3
6	(United States) L McNeil (Australia) N Provis	6	6

Third round
4	(Spain) C Martínez (Spain) A Sánchez Vicario	6	6
12	(Belgium) S Appelmans (Germany) C Porwik	1	3
(Netherlands) I Driehuis (France) N van Lottum	6^{7}	2
6	(United States) L McNeil (Australia) N Provis	7^{9}	6

Quarterfinals
4	(Spain) C Martínez (Spain) A Sánchez Vicario	6	6
6	(United States) L McNeil (Australia) N Provis	3	4

=== Bottom half ===
==== Section 3 ====
First round
8	(Canada) J Hetherington (United States) K Rinaldi	6	4	6
(Australia) J Hodder (Czechoslovakia) J Pospíšilová	1	6	1
(Italy) L Garrone (Italy) L Golarsa	2	7	2
(Australia) L Field (Australia) K Sharpe	6	5	6
(Mexico) L Novelo (Australia) K Radford	1	3
(Germany) S Graf (Germany) A Huber	6	6
WC	(France) S Amiach (France) A Fusai	5	3
9	(United States) P Fendick (Czechoslovakia) A Strnadová	7	6
13	(France) I Demongeot (France) N Tauziat	6	6
(Australia) K-A Guse (Australia) L Pleming	4	3
(United States) C Cunningham (United States) T Whitlinger	4	6^{3}
(Australia) K Godridge (Australia) A Woolcock	6	7^{7}
(Bulgaria) M Maleeva (Switzerland) M Maleeva-Fragniere	6^{5}	6	2
(Germany) E Pfaff (France) C Suire	7^{7}	3	6
(Australia) T Morton (United Kingdom) C Wood	7	3	8
3	(United States) MJ Fernández (United States) Z Garrison-Jackson	5	6	6

Second round
8	(Canada) J Hetherington (United States) K Rinaldi	7^{7}	6
(Australia) L Field (Australia) K Sharpe	6^{3}	2
(Germany) S Graf (Germany) A Huber	6	6
9	(United States) P Fendick (Czechoslovakia) A Strnadová	1	4
13	(France) I Demongeot (France) N Tauziat	6^{3}	7^{7}	6
(Australia) K Godridge (Australia) A Woolcock	7^{7}	6^{4}	2
(Germany) E Pfaff (France) C Suire	5	2
(Australia) T Morton (United Kingdom) C Wood	7	6

Third round
8	(Canada) J Hetherington (United States) K Rinaldi	3	4
(Germany) S Graf (Germany) A Huber	6	6
13	(France) I Demongeot (France) N Tauziat	2	7^{7}	6
(Australia) T Morton (United Kingdom) C Wood	6	6^{3}	2

Quarterfinals
(Germany) S Graf (Germany) A Huber	6	6
13	(France) I Demongeot (France) N Tauziat	4	1

==== Section 4 ====
First round
5	(United States) K Adams (Netherlands) M Bollegraf	6	6
(France) P Paradis (France) S Testud	4	3
(United States) E Burgin (South Africa) M de Swardt	6	6
(United States) A Keller (Japan) N Sawamatsu	2	3
(France) A Dechaume (France) J Halard	6	6
(United States) B Bowes (United States) J Emmons	0	2
(Germany) M Babel (Germany) W Probst	3	5
15	(Bulgaria) K Maleeva (Germany) B Rittner	6	7
11	(South Africa) R Fairbank-Nideffer (Italy) R Reggi	6	6
WC	(France) B Collet (France) N Guerrée	1	3
(South Africa) A Coetzer (Argentina) I Gorrochategui	1	6	8
(United States) D Graham (United States) G Helgeson	6	0	6
(United States) A Frazier (Japan) R Hiraki	2	5
(Australia) M Jaggard-Lai (Netherlands) C Vis	6	7
(United States) S Stafford (United States) M Werdel	3	4
2	(United States) G Fernández (Commonwealth of Independent States) N Zvereva	6	6

Second round
5	(United States) K Adams (Netherlands) M Bollegraf	4	6	6
(United States) E Burgin (South Africa) M de Swardt	6	4	3
(France) A Dechaume (France) J Halard	1	4
15	(Bulgaria) K Maleeva (Germany) B Rittner	6	6
11	(South Africa) R Fairbank-Nideffer (Italy) R Reggi
(South Africa) A Coetzer (Argentina) I Gorrochategui	d
(Australia) M Jaggard-Lai (Netherlands) C Vis	3	2
2	(United States) G Fernández (Commonwealth of Independent States) N Zvereva	6	6

Third round
5	(United States) K Adams (Netherlands) M Bollegraf	6	6
15	(Bulgaria) K Maleeva (Germany) B Rittner	2	3
11	(South Africa) R Fairbank-Nideffer (Italy) R Reggi	1	1
2	(United States) G Fernández (Commonwealth of Independent States) N Zvereva	6	6

Quarterfinals
5	(United States) K Adams (Netherlands) M Bollegraf	3	4
2	(United States) G Fernández (Commonwealth of Independent States) N Zvereva	6	6
