= 1989 French Open – Women's singles =

Women's singles
- 1989 French Open

Final
- Champion: (Spain) Arantxa Sánchez Vicario
- Runner-up: (West Germany) Steffi Graf
- Score: 7–6^{(8–6)}, 3–6, 7–5

Details
- Draw: 128
- Seeds: 16

Events
Singles	men	women		boys	girls
Doubles	men	women	mixed	boys	girls
WC Singles	men	women	quad
WC Doubles	men	women	quad
Legends	−45	45+	women
- French Open

Arantxa Sánchez Vicario defeated two-time defending champion Steffi Graf in the final, 7–6^{(8–6)}, 3–6, 7–5 to win the women's singles tennis title at the 1989 French Open. It was her first major singles title. This ended Graf's streak of major singles titles at five, and was her only loss at the majors in the 1989 season. Graf served for the championship at 5–3 in the third set, but lost the game to love and won only three more points from then on.

This tournament marked the major debut for future world No. 1 and nine-time major champion Monica Seles; at 15 years, 188 days old, she lost in the semifinals to Graf. It was the first French Open since 1978 not to feature Martina Navratilova or Chris Evert. The 1989 French Open was the only time where the Women’s singles and Men’s singles champions were both under the age of 18. Sanchez-Vicario was 17 years, 175 days old and Michael Chang was 17 years, 109 days old.

== Seeds ==
1. (West Germany) Steffi Graf (final)
2. (Argentina) Gabriela Sabatini (fourth round)
3. (Soviet Union) Natasha Zvereva (first round)
4. (United States) Zina Garrison (third round)
5. (Czechoslovakia) Helena Suková (second round)
6. (Bulgaria) Manuela Maleeva (quarterfinals)
7. (Spain) Arantxa Sánchez Vicario (champion)
8. (Spain) Conchita Martínez (quarterfinals)
9. (Bulgaria) Katerina Maleeva (fourth round)
10. (Canada) Helen Kelesi (quarterfinals)
11. (Czechoslovakia) Jana Novotná (quarterfinals)
12. (United States) Lori McNeil (second round)
13. (West Germany) Claudia Kohde-Kilsch (first round)
14. (Australia) Hana Mandlíková (first round)
15. (United States) Mary Joe Fernández (semifinals)
16. (United States) Susan Sloane (third round)

== Draw ==
Key

- Q = Qualifier
- WC = Wild card
- LL = Lucky loser
- Alt = Alternate
- ITF = ITF entry
- PR = Protected ranking
- SR = Special ranking
- SE = Special exempt
- JE = Junior exempt
- JR = Junior Accelerator Programme entrant
- CO = College Accelerator Programme entrant
- NG = Next Gen Accelerator Program entrant
- w/o = Walkover
- r = Retired
- d = Defaulted

=== Finals ===
Quarterfinals
1	(West Germany) Steffi Graf	6	6
8	(Spain) Conchita Martínez	0	4
(Socialist Federal Republic of Yugoslavia) Monica Seles	6	7
6	(Bulgaria) Manuela Maleeva	3	5
7	(Spain) Arantxa Sánchez Vicario	6	6
11	(Czechoslovakia) Jana Novotná	2	2
10	(Canada) Helen Kelesi	2	5
15	(United States) Mary Joe Fernández	6	7

Semifinals
1	(West Germany) Steffi Graf	6	3	6
(Socialist Federal Republic of Yugoslavia) Monica Seles	3	6	3
7	(Spain) Arantxa Sánchez Vicario	6	6
15	(United States) Mary Joe Fernández	2	2

Final
1	(West Germany) Steffi Graf	6^{6}	6	5
7	(Spain) Arantxa Sánchez Vicario	7^{8}	3	7

=== Top half ===
==== Section 1 ====
First round
1	(West Germany) S Graf	6	6
(United States) C Benjamin	1	1
(Argentina) B Fulco	7	6^{3}	8
Q	(Austria) P Ritter	5	7^{7}	6
(Netherlands) N Jagerman	6	7^{7}
(Denmark) T Scheuer-Larsen	2	6^{2}
(Australia) M Jaggard	6	6
(United States) A Frazier	0	3
Q	(Italy) S La Fratta	6	6
(United States) G Fernández	2	0
(South Africa) K Schimper	3	3
(South Africa) E Reinach	6	6
(West Germany) S Meier	6^{0}	6	6
(Poland) I Kuczyńska	7^{7}	4	4
Q	(Brazil) A Vieira	6^{8}	6	6
14	(Australia) H Mandlíková	7^{10}	1	4

Second round
1	(West Germany) S Graf	6	6
(Argentina) B Fulco	0	1
(Netherlands) N Jagerman	6	6
(Australia) M Jaggard	3	3
Q	(Italy) S La Fratta	6	5	6
(South Africa) E Reinach	3	7	3
(West Germany) S Meier	2	2
Q	(Brazil) A Vieira	6	6

Third round
1	(West Germany) S Graf	6	6
(Netherlands) N Jagerman	1	2
Q	(Italy) S La Fratta	6	7
Q	(Brazil) A Vieira	4	5

Fourth round
1	(West Germany) S Graf	6	6
Q	(Italy) S La Fratta	2	1

==== Section 2 ====
First round
9	(Bulgaria) K Maleeva	7^{7}	6
(Netherlands) B Schultz	6^{2}	1
(United States) E Hakami	0	1
(France) C Tanvier	6	6
(United States) M Torres	7	3	0
LL	(Japan) K Date	5	6	6
(West Germany) M Pawlik	6^{4}	6	6
(United States) T Phelps	7^{7}	2	4
(West Germany) W Probst	4	3
(Peru) L Gildemeister	6	6
WC	(France) S Amiach	3	6	7
LL	(Czechoslovakia) L Lásková	6	1	5
Q	(Czechoslovakia) J Pospíšilová	6	6
LL	(Czechoslovakia) D Krajčovičová	0	2
(United States) B Herr	3	2
8	(Spain) C Martínez	6	6

Second round
9	(Bulgaria) K Maleeva	6	6
(France) C Tanvier	0	2
LL	(Japan) K Date	4	6^{2}
(West Germany) M Pawlik	6	7^{7}
(Peru) L Gildemeister	6^{0}	7^{7}	3
WC	(France) S Amiach	7^{7}	6^{4}	6
Q	(Czechoslovakia) J Pospíšilová	0	4
8	(Spain) C Martínez	6	6

Third round
9	(Bulgaria) K Maleeva	4	6	6
(West Germany) M Pawlik	6	1	2
WC	(France) S Amiach	3	3
8	(Spain) C Martínez	6	6

Fourth round
9	(Bulgaria) K Maleeva	0	1
8	(Spain) C Martínez	6	6

==== Section 3 ====
First round
4	(United States) Z Garrison	6	6
(United States) L Allen	2	2
(Italy) C Caverzasio	6	6
(Belgium) A Devries	4	4
(Socialist Federal Republic of Yugoslavia) M Seles	6	6
(United States) R Reis	4	1
(United States) S Martin	7	7^{7}
(United States) K Adams	5	6^{3}
(Australia) J-A Faull	6	6
WC	(France) C Suire	1	2
(Argentina) A Villagrán	6	6
(United States) L-A Eldredge	1	1
(West Germany) S Frankl	2	2
WC	(France) C Mothes-Jobkel	6	6
(United States) C Cunningham	0	2
16	(United States) S Sloane	6	6

Second round
4	(United States) Z Garrison	5	6	6
(Italy) C Caverzasio	7	3	2
(Socialist Federal Republic of Yugoslavia) M Seles	6	6
(United States) S Martin	0	2
(Australia) J-A Faull	6^{1}	6	6
(Argentina) A Villagrán	7^{7}	1	1
WC	(France) C Mothes-Jobkel	1	1
16	(United States) S Sloane	6	6

Third round
4	(United States) Z Garrison	3	2
(Socialist Federal Republic of Yugoslavia) M Seles	6	6
(Australia) J-A Faull	6	6
16	(United States) S Sloane	3	1

Fourth round
(Socialist Federal Republic of Yugoslavia) M Seles	6	6
(Australia) J-A Faull	3	2

==== Section 4 ====
First round
12	(United States) L McNeil	6	6
(France) N Tauziat	4	4
(South Africa) D Van Rensburg	6	3	2
(Netherlands) M Bollegraf	3	6	6
Q	(Australia) J Tremelling	6	2	6
(Sweden) C Lindqvist	3	6	4
(Italy) L Ferrando	6	5	3
WC	(France) P Etchemendy	2	7	6
(United States) E Burgin	6	6
(Austria) J Wiesner	3	4
(West Germany) I Cueto	0	5
(Soviet Union) L Savchenko	6	7
(Belgium) S Wasserman	3	7	6
Q	(West Germany) S Hack	6	5	3
(Australia) E Smylie	4	4
6	(Bulgaria) M Maleeva	6	6

Second round
12	(United States) L McNeil	2	1
(Netherlands) M Bollegraf	6	6
Q	(Australia) J Tremelling	6	6
WC	(France) P Etchemendy	1	4
(United States) E Burgin	5	6^{5}
(Soviet Union) L Savchenko	7	7^{7}
(Belgium) S Wasserman	3	7	3
6	(Bulgaria) M Maleeva	6	5	6

Third round
(Netherlands) M Bollegraf	2	3
Q	(Australia) J Tremelling	6	6
(Soviet Union) L Savchenko	1	2
6	(Bulgaria) M Maleeva	6	6

Fourth round
Q	(Australia) J Tremelling	6^{3}	2
6	(Bulgaria) M Maleeva	7^{7}	6

=== Bottom half ===
==== Section 5 ====
First round
7	(Spain) A Sánchez Vicario	6	6
(Czechoslovakia) R Rajchrtová	2	1
(Argentina) M Paz	3	5
(France) I Demongeot	6	7
(Greece) A Kanellopoulou	6	6
(Sweden) M Strandlund	1	1
(Australia) R McQuillan	6	3	2
Q	(Soviet Union) N Medvedeva	3	6	6
(United States) S Stafford	6	6
(Japan) K Okamoto	4	4
(South Africa) A Coetzer	6	6
(West Germany) V Martinek	4	1
WC	(France) E Derly	6	3	5
(United Kingdom) S Gomer	2	6	7
(France) K Quentrec	4	6	8
13	(West Germany) C Kohde-Kilsch	6	2	6

Second round
7	(Spain) A Sánchez Vicario	6	6
(France) I Demongeot	4	4
(Greece) A Kanellopoulou	0	1
Q	(Soviet Union) N Medvedeva	6	6
(United States) S Stafford	3	3
(South Africa) A Coetzer	6	6
(United Kingdom) S Gomer	4	6	3
(France) K Quentrec	6	3	6

Third round
7	(Spain) A Sánchez Vicario	6	3	6
Q	(Soviet Union) N Medvedeva	0	6	2
(South Africa) A Coetzer	7^{8}	6
(France) K Quentrec	6^{6}	1

Fourth round
7	(Spain) A Sánchez Vicario	6	6
(South Africa) A Coetzer	3	2

==== Section 6 ====
First round
11	(Czechoslovakia) J Novotná	6	6
(France) J Halard	3	2
(West Germany) C Porwik	6	6
(Socialist Federal Republic of Yugoslavia) S Goleš	4	2
(United States) M McGrath	1	3
(Canada) R Simpson	6	6
(United States) M Werdel	6	6^{4}	7
(Australia) J Byrne	2	7^{7}	5
(Czechoslovakia) I Budařová	7^{7}	5	1
(France) N Guerrée	6^{5}	7	6
(Italy) L Golarsa	6	6
(West Germany) E Pfaff	3	4
WC	(France) S Niox-Château	7^{7}	0	3
(West Germany) S Hanika	6^{5}	6	6
(Italy) R Reggi	3	7^{7}	6
3	(Soviet Union) N Zvereva	6	6^{5}	2

Second round
11	(Czechoslovakia) J Novotná	6	7
(West Germany) C Porwik	3	5
(Canada) R Simpson	6	6
(United States) M Werdel	3	4
(France) N Guerrée	4	5
(Italy) L Golarsa	6	7
(West Germany) S Hanika	2	6	7
(Italy) R Reggi	6	1	5

Third round
11	(Czechoslovakia) J Novotná	6	6
(Canada) R Simpson	1	0
(Italy) L Golarsa	6	1	3
(West Germany) S Hanika	4	6	6

Fourth round
11	(Czechoslovakia) J Novotná	6	6
(West Germany) S Hanika	1	4

==== Section 7 ====
First round
5	(Czechoslovakia) H Suková	7	6
(Soviet Union) L Meskhi	5	1
(Czechoslovakia) P Langrová	5	1
(Japan) A Kijimuta	7	6
LL	(Spain) I Varas	3	3
(Australia) A Minter	6	6
(United States) A Grossman	7	6
(Argentina) P Tarabini	5	1
(United States) G Magers	6	3	7
WC	(France) M Laval	3	6	5
(United States) K Rinaldi	3	6	6
Q	(Italy) B Romanò	6	0	3
(Hungary) A Temesvári	6	6
(United States) B Bowes	4	4
(Czechoslovakia) R Zrubáková	1	2
10	(Canada) H Kelesi	6	6

Second round
5	(Czechoslovakia) H Suková	1	5
(Japan) A Kijimuta	6	7
(Australia) A Minter	4	4
(United States) A Grossman	6	6
(United States) G Magers	6	6
(United States) K Rinaldi	2	3
(Hungary) A Temesvári	0	6^{4}
10	(Canada) H Kelesi	6	7^{7}

Third round
(Japan) A Kijimuta	4	1
(United States) A Grossman	6	6
(United States) G Magers	4	6	3
10	(Canada) H Kelesi	6	2	6

Fourth round
(United States) A Grossman	1	2
10	(Canada) H Kelesi	6	6

==== Section 8 ====
First round
15	(United States) MJ Fernández	6	6
(France) N Herreman	2	3
(United Kingdom) J Durie	4	2
(United States) A Farley	6	6
(Brazil) N Dias	6	6
(United States) R White	1	1
(Italy) A-M Cecchini	6	4	4
(Austria) B Paulus	1	6	6
(Italy) L Lapi	7	6
(Australia) L Field	5	0
(Australia) N Provis	4	6	6
(United States) D Faber	6	4	0
LL	(Czechoslovakia) R Maršíková	3	4
WC	(France) A Dechaume	6	6
(Japan) A Nishiya	0	0
2	(Argentina) G Sabatini	6	6

Second round
15	(United States) MJ Fernández	6^{6}	6	6
(United States) A Farley	7^{8}	3	1
(Brazil) N Dias	7^{7}	7
(Austria) B Paulus	6^{1}	5
(Italy) L Lapi	1	1
(Australia) N Provis	6	6
WC	(France) A Dechaume	3	1
2	(Argentina) G Sabatini	6	6

Third round
15	(United States) MJ Fernández	6^{3}	6	6
(Brazil) N Dias	7^{7}	1	1
(Australia) N Provis	6	5	3
2	(Argentina) G Sabatini	4	7	6

Fourth round
15	(United States) MJ Fernández	6	6
2	(Argentina) G Sabatini	4	4

Preceded by 1989 Australian Open – Women's singles	Grand Slam women's singles	Succeeded by 1989 Wimbledon Championships – Women's singles
