= 1990 French Open – Women's doubles =

Women's doubles
- 1990 French Open

Final
- Champion: (Czechoslovakia) Jana Novotná (Czechoslovakia) Helena Suková
- Runner-up: (Soviet Union) Larisa Neiland (Soviet Union) Natasha Zvereva
- Score: 6–4, 7–5

Details
- Draw: 64 (4 WC )
- Seeds: 16

Events
Singles	men	women		boys	girls
Doubles	men	women	mixed	boys	girls
WC Singles	men	women	quad
WC Doubles	men	women	quad
Legends	−45	45+	women
- French Open

Larisa Neiland and Natasha Zvereva were the defending champions, but lost in the final to Jana Novotná and Helena Suková 4–6, 5–7.

== Draw ==
Key

- Q = Qualifier
- WC = Wild card
- LL = Lucky loser
- Alt = Alternate
- ITF = ITF entry
- PR = Protected ranking
- SR = Special ranking
- SE = Special exempt
- JE = Junior exempt
- JR = Junior Accelerator Programme entrant
- CO = College Accelerator Programme entrant
- NG = Next Gen Accelerator Program entrant
- w/o = Walkover
- r = Retired
- d = Defaulted

=== Finals ===
Quarterfinals
1	(Czechoslovakia) Jana Novotná (Czechoslovakia) Helena Suková	6	6
(Czechoslovakia) Regina Rajchrtová (Hungary) Andrea Temesvári	4	0
4	(Argentina) Mercedes Paz (Spain) Arantxa Sánchez Vicario	4	4
6	(Australia) Nicole Provis (South Africa) Elna Reinach	6	6
14	(France) Nathalie Tauziat (Austria) Judith Wiesner	6	5	6
16	(West Germany) Claudia Kohde-Kilsch (Netherlands) Brenda Schultz	2	7	3
9	(Italy) Sandra Cecchini (Argentina) Patricia Tarabini	4	3
2	(Soviet Union) Larisa Neiland (Soviet Union) Natasha Zvereva	6	6

Semifinals
1	(Czechoslovakia) Jana Novotná (Czechoslovakia) Helena Suková	6	6
6	(Australia) Nicole Provis (South Africa) Elna Reinach	4	0
14	(France) Nathalie Tauziat (Austria) Judith Wiesner	2	2
2	(Soviet Union) Larisa Neiland (Soviet Union) Natasha Zvereva	6	6

Final
1	(Czechoslovakia) Jana Novotná (Czechoslovakia) Helena Suková	6	7
2	(Soviet Union) Larisa Neiland (Soviet Union) Natasha Zvereva	4	5

=== Top half ===
==== Section 1 ====
First round
1	(Czechoslovakia) J Novotná (Czechoslovakia) H Suková	6	6
(France) I Demongeot (France) C Tanvier	4	1
(Peru) L Gildemeister (Denmark) T Scheuer-Larsen	6	6
(Netherlands) C Bakkum (South Africa) K Schimper	0	1
(United States) P Barg-Mager (United States) B Herr	1	6	3
(United States) T Phelps (United States) S Stafford	6	4	6
(Australia) K McDonald (Australia) T Morton	0	4
11	(South Africa) L Gregory (United States) G Magers	6	6
13	(Netherlands) M Bollegraf (Italy) R Reggi	6	6
(United States) D Faber (Australia) A Minter	4	1
WC	(France) A Dechaume (France) E Derly	6	6
WC	(France) P Etchemendy (France) N Guerrée	3	3
(West Germany) S Meier (Czechoslovakia) J Pospíšilová	2	4
(United States) B Bowes (United States) M Werdel	6	6
(Czechoslovakia) R Rajchrtová (Hungary) A Temesvári	6	7^{7}
8	(Peru) P Vásquez (Brazil) A Vieira	1	6^{1}

Second round
1	(Czechoslovakia) J Novotná (Czechoslovakia) H Suková	6	7^{7}
(Peru) L Gildemeister (Denmark) T Scheuer-Larsen	1	6^{1}
(United States) T Phelps (United States) S Stafford	1	7^{9}	2
11	(South Africa) L Gregory (United States) G Magers	6	6^{7}	6
13	(Netherlands) M Bollegraf (Italy) R Reggi	6	7^{7}
WC	(France) A Dechaume (France) E Derly	3	6^{5}
(United States) B Bowes (United States) M Werdel	0	6^{3}
(Czechoslovakia) R Rajchrtová (Hungary) A Temesvári	6	7^{7}

Third round
1	(Czechoslovakia) J Novotná (Czechoslovakia) H Suková	7^{7}	3	6
11	(South Africa) L Gregory (United States) G Magers	6^{0}	6	2
13	(Netherlands) M Bollegraf (Italy) R Reggi	6^{3}	1
(Czechoslovakia) R Rajchrtová (Hungary) A Temesvári	7^{7}	6

Quarterfinals
1	(Czechoslovakia) J Novotná (Czechoslovakia) H Suková	4	7^{9}	6
(Czechoslovakia) R Rajchrtová (Hungary) A Temesvári	6	6^{7}	4

==== Section 2 ====
First round
4	(Argentina) M Paz (Spain) A Sánchez Vicario	6	6
(Italy) B Romanò (Czechoslovakia) E Švíglerová	2	4
(Australia) M Jaggard (United States) N Hu	6^{5}	6	6
(South Africa) R Field (United States) J Thomas	7^{7}	3	2
(France) S Amiach (France) N Herreman	6	3	2
(Sweden) C Lindqvist (Sweden) M Lindström	3	6	6
(Czechoslovakia) I Budařová (Belgium) S Wasserman	0	3
10	(Soviet Union) N Medvedeva (Soviet Union) L Meskhi	6	6
15	(Australia) J-A Faull (Australia) R McQuillan	7	7
(Italy) C Caverzasio (Italy) L Garrone	5	5
(Bulgaria) K Maleeva (Switzerland) M Maleeva-Fragnière	6	6
WC	(France) J Halard (France) K Quentrec	3	3
WC	(France) S Sabas (France) S Testud	6^{4}	6	6
(Netherlands) N Jagerman (South Africa) D Van Rensburg	7^{7}	0	1
(United States) J Capriati (United States) Z Garrison-Jackson	4	3
6	(Australia) N Provis (South Africa) E Reinach	6	6

Second round
4	(Argentina) M Paz (Spain) A Sánchez Vicario	6	6
(Australia) M Jaggard (United States) N Hu	1	2
(Sweden) C Lindqvist (Sweden) M Lindström	1	3
10	(Soviet Union) N Medvedeva (Soviet Union) L Meskhi	6	6
15	(Australia) J-A Faull (Australia) R McQuillan	4	7	8
(Bulgaria) K Maleeva (Switzerland) M Maleeva-Fragnière	6	5	6
WC	(France) S Sabas (France) S Testud	0	1
6	(Australia) N Provis (South Africa) E Reinach	6	6

Third round
4	(Argentina) M Paz (Spain) A Sánchez Vicario	6	6
10	(Soviet Union) N Medvedeva (Soviet Union) L Meskhi	4	3
15	(Australia) J-A Faull (Australia) R McQuillan	3	4
6	(Australia) N Provis (South Africa) E Reinach	6	6

Quarterfinals
4	(Argentina) M Paz (Spain) A Sánchez Vicario	4	4
6	(Australia) N Provis (South Africa) E Reinach	6	6

=== Bottom half ===
==== Section 3 ====
First round
5	(United States) K Adams (United States) L McNeil	6	6
(Brazil) L Corsato (Austria) H Sprung	4	3
(Australia) J Byrne (Australia) J Tremelling	3	6	6
(Italy) L Ferrando (Socialist Federal Republic of Yugoslavia) S Goleš	6	2	3
(France) P Paradis (France) C Suire	6	6
(Czechoslovakia) M Frimmelová (Argentina) A Villagrán-Reami	4	1
(Czechoslovakia) P Langrová (Czechoslovakia) R Zrubáková	5	3
14	(France) N Tauziat (Austria) J Wiesner	7	6
16	(West Germany) C Kohde-Kilsch (Netherlands) B Schultz	6	6
(United States) S Collins (United States) J Smoller	1	2
(Japan) M Kidowaki (Australia) A Scott	6	6
(Switzerland) E Krapl (Netherlands) H ter Riet	2	1
(Australia) K Radford (United States) L Spadea	3	6	1
(Argentina) G Castro (Spain) C Martínez	6	3	6
(United States) S Foltz (Japan) N Miyagi	3	1
3	(United States) K Jordan (Australia) E Smylie	6	6

Second round
5	(United States) K Adams (United States) L McNeil	1	6	8
(Australia) J Byrne (Australia) J Tremelling	6	4	6
(France) P Paradis (France) C Suire	4	4
14	(France) N Tauziat (Austria) J Wiesner	6	6
16	(West Germany) C Kohde-Kilsch (Netherlands) B Schultz	5	7^{7}	6
(Japan) M Kidowaki (Australia) A Scott	7	6^{3}	1
(Argentina) G Castro (Spain) C Martínez	7	1	6
3	(United States) K Jordan (Australia) E Smylie	5	6	1

Third round
5	(United States) K Adams (United States) L McNeil	6	2	1
14	(France) N Tauziat (Austria) J Wiesner	3	6	6
16	(West Germany) C Kohde-Kilsch (Netherlands) B Schultz	7	6
(Argentina) G Castro (Spain) C Martínez	5	3

Quarterfinals
14	(France) N Tauziat (Austria) J Wiesner	6	5	6
16	(West Germany) C Kohde-Kilsch (Netherlands) B Schultz	2	7	3

==== Section 4 ====
First round
8	(United States) E Burgin (South Africa) R Fairbank-Nideffer	6	6
(United States) L Allen (United States) C Benjamin	4	2
(Bulgaria) E Pampoulova (West Germany) W Probst	6	6
(Finland) A Aallonen (Netherlands) S Schilder	4	3
(Sweden) M Strandlund (Australia) R Stubbs	1	5
(Canada) C Bassett-Seguso (United States) A Grossman	6	7
(Soviet Union) E Brioukhovets (Czechoslovakia) L Lásková	6^{4}	3
9	(Italy) S Cecchini (Argentina) P Tarabini	7^{7}	6
12	(United States) B Nagelsen (Socialist Federal Republic of Yugoslavia) M Seles	6	6
(United States) Ca. MacGregor (United States) Cy. MacGregor	3	1
(Hungary) R Szikszay (Netherlands) C Vis	7	1	6
(United States) A Grousbeck (Canada) R Simpson	5	6	2
(South Africa) L Barnard (Australia) L Field	3	6	2
(Denmark) S Albinus (France) N van Lottum	6	4	6
(Argentina) B Fulco (Argentina) F Labat	0	3
2	(Soviet Union) L Neiland (Soviet Union) N Zvereva	6	6

Second round
8	(United States) E Burgin (South Africa) R Fairbank-Nideffer	2	3
(Bulgaria) E Pampoulova (West Germany) W Probst	6	6
(Canada) C Bassett-Seguso (United States) A Grossman	6	2	3
9	(Italy) S Cecchini (Argentina) P Tarabini	0	6	6
12	(United States) B Nagelsen (Socialist Federal Republic of Yugoslavia) M Seles	6	6
(Hungary) R Szikszay (Netherlands) C Vis	2	3
(Denmark) S Albinus (France) N van Lottum	3	7^{7}	3
2	(Soviet Union) L Neiland (Soviet Union) N Zvereva	6	6^{5}	6

Third round
(Bulgaria) E Pampoulova (West Germany) W Probst	2	1
9	(Italy) S Cecchini (Argentina) P Tarabini	6	6
12	(United States) B Nagelsen (Socialist Federal Republic of Yugoslavia) M Seles	3	6	1
2	(Soviet Union) L Neiland (Soviet Union) N Zvereva	6	1	6

Quarterfinals
9	(Italy) S Cecchini (Argentina) P Tarabini	4	3
2	(Soviet Union) L Neiland (Soviet Union) N Zvereva	6	6
