= Inmaculada Varas =

Spanish tennis player (born 1964)

- Full name: Inmaculada Varas-Caro
- Country (sports): Spain
- Born: 8 December 1964 (age 61)
- Prize money: $46,599

Singles
- Highest ranking: No. 174 (24 October 1988)

Grand Slam singles results
- French Open: 1R (1989)

Doubles
- Highest ranking: No. 244 (18 July 1988)

Inmaculada Varas-Caro (born 8 December 1964) is a Spanish former tennis player.

== Biography ==
The date Inmaculada Varas was born on December 8, is also the Roman Catholic Feast of the Immaculate Conception. It's likely the date influenced her name. Varas played on the professional tour in the 1980s and 1990s, reaching a best ranking of 174 in the world. In 1988, she made the second round of two WTA Tour events, the Spanish Open and Belgian Open. She featured in the main draw of the 1989 French Open, as a lucky loser from qualifying.

== ITF finals ==
$25,000 tournaments
$10,000 tournaments

=== Singles: 6 (5–1) ===
Result	No.	Date	Tournament	Surface	Opponent	Score
Win	1.	29 June 1987	Brindisi, Italy	Clay	(United Kingdom) Sarah Sullivan	6–2, 6–0
Win	2.	20 July 1987	Sezze, Italy	Clay	(Italy) Sabrina Lucchi	6–2, 6–1
Loss	1.	21 September 1987	Valencia, Spain	Clay	(Spain) María José Llorca	6–2, 1–6, 2–6
Win	3.	30 May 1988	Adria, Italy	Clay	(Argentina) Gaby Castro	7–5, 3–6, 6–3
Win	4.	17 February 1992	Montechoro, Portugal	Hard	(Germany) Antonela Voina	6–4, 6–3
Win	5.	30 August 1993	Marina di Massa, Italy	Clay	(Austria) Melanie Schnell	7–6, 6–2

=== Doubles: 4 (0–4) ===
Result	No.	Date	Tournament	Surface	Partner	Opponents	Score
Loss	1.	16 September 1985	Majorca, Spain	Clay	(Spain) Ninoska Souto	(Netherlands) Carin Bakkum (Netherlands) Nicole Muns-Jagerman	4–6, 0–6
Loss	2.	21 September 1987	Valencia, Spain	Clay	(Spain) María José Llorca	(Spain) Rosa Bielsa (Spain) Elena Guerra	3–6, 6–3, 3–6
Loss	3.	18 September 1989	Porto, Portugal	Clay	(Spain) Virginia Ruano Pascual	(Spain) Janet Souto (Spain) Rosa Bielsa	6–3, 3–6, 4–6
Loss	4.	19 July 1993	Bilbao, Spain	Clay	(Spain) Silvia Ramón-Cortés	(Argentina) Maria Fernanda Landa (Portugal) Sofia Prazeres	4–6, 4–6
