= Nathalie Tauziat =

French tennis player and coach (born 1967)

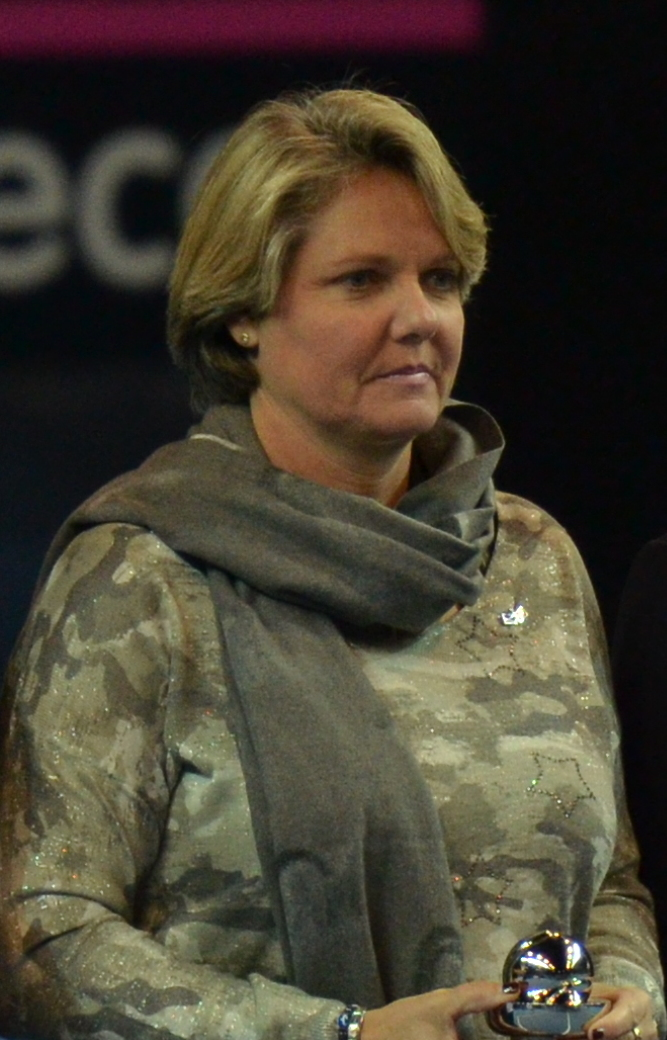
- Tauziat at the 2016 Billie Jean King Cup (Fed Cup)
- Country (sports): France
- Residence: Anglet, France
- Born: 17 October 1967 (age 58) Bangui, Central African Republic
- Height: 1.65 m (5 ft 5 in)
- Turned pro: 1984
- Retired: 2003
- Plays: Right-handed (one handed-backhand)
- Prize money: $6,650,093

Singles
- Career record: 606–365 (62.4%)
- Career titles: 8
- Highest ranking: No. 3 (8 May 2000)

Grand Slam singles results
- Australian Open: 4R (1993)
- French Open: QF (1991)
- Wimbledon: F (1998)
- US Open: QF (2000)

Other tournaments
- Grand Slam Cup: SF (1998)

Doubles
- Career record: 525–326
- Career titles: 25
- Highest ranking: No. 3 (8 October 2001)

Grand Slam doubles results
- Australian Open: 3R (1993)
- French Open: SF (1990, 1994, 1997, 1999, 2000)
- Wimbledon: SF (2001)
- US Open: F (2001)

Team competitions
- Fed Cup: W (1997)

Nathalie Tauziat (French pronunciation: [natali tozja]; born 17 October 1967) is a French tennis coach and former professional player. She was the runner-up in women's singles at the 1998 Wimbledon Championships and runner-up in the women's doubles at the 2001 US Open partnering Kimberly Po-Messerli. She reached a career-high ranking of world No. 3 in both singles and doubles.

She previously coached Canadian tennis player Bianca Andreescu and compatriot Harmony Tan, and currently coaches Victoria Mboko.

== Early life ==
Tauziat was born in Bangui, Central African Republic, where she lived for the first eight years of her life. She is a first cousin of Didier Deschamps, former captain and manager of the French football team. About a week after Tauziat reached the Wimbledon final on 4 July 1998, Deschamps led France to win the World Cup on 12 July 1998.

== Career ==
Tauziat turned professional in 1984. She won her first singles title in 1990. She reached her only Grand Slam singles final at the 1998 Wimbledon Championships, beating Lindsay Davenport in the quarterfinals and Natasha Zvereva in the semifinals before losing to Jana Novotná. Her appearance in this final was the first by a Frenchwoman since Suzanne Lenglen in 1925.

Tauziat was runner-up with partner Kimberly Po in the 2001 US Open women's doubles final, losing to the team of Lisa Raymond and Rennae Stubbs. She and partner Alexandra Fusai were doubles runners-up at the 1997 and 1998 Chase Championships. She was also part of the 1997 French Fed Cup team, which won its first title in the history of the competition.

Tauziat reached her career-high singles ranking of world No. 3 at the age of 32 years and 6 months in the spring of 2000, making her the oldest woman to debut in the top three and the fourth oldest to be ranked in the top three. She retired from the WTA Tour after the 2003 French Open, after having played only doubles in 2002 and 2003. Tauziat won 8 singles titles and 25 doubles titles on the WTA Tour in her career.

She wrote a book with the title "Les Dessous du tennis féminin" (published in 2001 in French) in which she gave her insights about life on the women's professional tennis circuit. In 2004 Tauziat received a state honour – le chevalier de la Légion d'honneur – from French President Jacques Chirac for her contributions to international tennis. She was an official WTA Tour mentor to French tennis player Marion Bartoli, beginning in 2003.

== Career statistics ==
=== Grand Slam performance timelines ===
Key
W	F	SF	QF	#R	RR	Q#	DNQ	A	NH

(W) winner; (F) finalist; (SF) semifinalist; (QF) quarterfinalist; (#R) rounds 4, 3, 2, 1; (RR) round-robin stage; (Q#) qualification round; (DNQ) did not qualify; (A) absent; (NH) not held; (SR) strike rate (events won / competed); (W–L) win–loss record.

==== Singles ====
Tournament	1984	1985	1986	1987	1988	1989	1990	1991	1992	1993	1994	1995	1996	1997	1998	1999	2000	2001	Career SR	Career win–loss
Australian Open	A	A	NH	A	A	A	A	A	A	4R	1R	A	A	A	A	A	2R	A	0 / 3	4–3
French Open	1R	3R	2R	4R	4R	1R	4R	QF	4R	3R	2R	3R	2R	3R	1R	2R	3R	1R	0 / 18	30–18
Wimbledon	A	LQ	2R	2R	2R	1R	4R	4R	QF	4R	3R	3R	3R	QF	F	QF	1R	QF	0 / 16	40–16
US Open	A	LQ	1R	2R	2R	3R	4R	1R	2R	4R	2R	3R	2R	1R	4R	3R	QF	4R	0 / 16	27–16
SR	0 / 1	0 / 1	0 / 3	0 / 3	0 / 3	0 / 3	0 / 3	0 / 3	0 / 3	0 / 4	0 / 4	0 / 3	0 / 3	0 / 3	0 / 3	0 / 3	0 / 4	0 / 1	0 / 53	101–53

==== Doubles ====
Tournament	1985	1986	1987	1988	1989	1990	1991	1992	1993	1994	1995	1996	1997	1998	1999	2000	2001	2002	2003	Career SR
Australian Open	A	NH	A	A	A	A	A	A	3R	2R	A	A	A	A	A	2R	A	A	A	0 / 3
French Open	1R	3R	QF	3R	3R	SF	3R	QF	QF	SF	QF	3R	SF	QF	SF	SF	QF	2R	1R	0 / 19
Wimbledon	3R	1R	2R	3R	1R	3R	3R	3R	2R	3R	3R	2R	3R	2R	2R	2R	SF	QF	A	0 / 18
US Open	2R	1R	1R	1R	3R	2R	3R	3R	2R	1R	QF	1R	QF	2R	3R	3R	F	A	A	0 / 17
SR	0 / 3	0 / 3	0 / 3	0 / 3	0 / 3	0 / 3	0 / 3	0 / 3	0 / 4	0 / 4	0 / 3	0 / 3	0 / 3	0 / 3	0 / 3	0 / 4	0 / 3	0 / 2	0 / 1	0 / 57

=== Grand Slam finals ===
==== Singles: 1 (1 runner-up) ====
Result	Year	Championship	Surface	Opponent	Score
Loss	1998	Wimbledon	Grass	(Czech Republic) Jana Novotná	4–6, 6–7^{(2–7)}

==== Doubles: 1 (1 runner-up) ====
Result	Year	Championship	Surface	Partner	Opponents	Score
Loss	2001	US Open	Hard	(United States) Kimberly Po-Messerli	(United States) Lisa Raymond (Australia) Rennae Stubbs	2–6, 7–5, 5–7

=== Year-end championships ===
==== Doubles: 2 (2 runner-ups) ====
Result	Year	Championship	Surface	Partner	Opponents	Score
Loss	1997	New York	Carpet (i)	(France) Alexandra Fusai	(United States) Lindsay Davenport (Czech Republic) Jana Novotná	7–6^{(7–5)}, 3–6, 2–6
Loss	1998	New York	Carpet (i)	(France) Alexandra Fusai	(United States) Lindsay Davenport (Belarus) Natasha Zvereva	7–6^{(8–6)}, 5–7, 3–6

== See also ==
- Performance timelines for all female tennis players since 1978 who reached at least one Grand Slam final
