= Anne Grousbeck =

American tennis player

- Country (sports): United States
- Born: February 5, 1966 (age 59)
- Prize money: $35,709

Singles
- Highest ranking: No. 214 (September 11, 1989)

Doubles
- Highest ranking: No. 100 (May 7, 1990)

Grand Slam doubles results
- Australian Open: 2R (1990)
- French Open: 1R (1990)
- Wimbledon: 1R (1990)

Grand Slam mixed doubles results
- French Open: 2R (1990)
- Wimbledon: 1R (1990)

Anne Matta (born Anne Grousbeck; February 5, 1966, in Miami, Florida) is an American former professional tennis player.

== Career ==
A three-time All-American at the University of Texas, Grousbeck competed on the professional tour after graduating in 1988. She featured on the tour until 1991, making the most impact as a doubles player, with a best doubles ranking of 100 in the world. In the 1990 season, she featured in the main draw of the women's doubles at the Australian Open, French Open and Wimbledon.

== Personal life ==
Grousbeck is married to Chilean tennis player Horacio Matta. She is the daughter of Massachusetts entrepreneur H. Irving Grousbeck and her brother, Wyc Grousbeck, is the lead owner of the Boston Celtics.

== ITF finals ==
$25,000 tournaments
$10,000 tournaments

=== Singles: 1 (0–1) ===
Result	No.	Date	Tournament	Surface	Opponent	Score
Loss	1.	January 5, 1987	Chicago, United States	Hard	(Netherlands) Brenda Schultz-McCarthy	4–6, 3–6

=== Doubles: 7 (2–5) ===
Result	No.	Date	Tournament	Surface	Partner	Opponents	Score
Loss	1.	July 15, 1985	Detroit, United States	Clay	(Japan) Akemi Nishiya-Kinoshita	(United States) Cammy MacGregor (United States) Cynthia MacGregor	3–6, 6–2, 2–6
Win	1.	August 4, 1986	Chatham, United States	Hard	(Japan) Maya Kidowaki	(Australia) Colleen Carney (Brazil) Luciana Corsato-Owsianka	6–3, 6–4
Loss	2.	January 4, 1988	Johannesburg, South Africa	Hard	(United States) Vincenza Procacci	(South Africa) Linda Barnard (South Africa) Mariaan de Swardt	5–7, 2–6
Win	2.	September 12, 1988	Arzachena, Italy	Hard	(Australia) Tracey Morton	(Spain) Rosa Bielsa (Spain) Janet Souto	7–5, 6–1
Loss	3.	June 26, 1989	Arezzo, Italy	Clay	(Japan) Ei Iida	(Argentina) Gabriela Castro (Spain) Conchita Martínez	-
Loss	4.	July 3, 1989	Cava Tirr, Italy	Clay	(Netherlands) Titia Wilmink	(Australia) Kate McDonald (Australia) Rennae Stubbs	6–2, 1–6, 1–6
Loss	5.	November 12, 1990	Porto Alegre, Brazil	Clay	(Sri Lanka) Lihini Weerasuriya	(Brazil) Cláudia Chabalgoity (Brazil) Luciana Tella	1–6, 1–6
