= Anne Aallonen =

Finnish-born Hong Kong tennis player

- Country (sports): Finland; Hong Kong
- Born: July 15, 1967 (age 58) Lahti, Finland
- Retired: 1999
- Prize money: $43,769

Singles
- Career record: 79-84
- Highest ranking: No. 179 (23 October 1989)

Doubles
- Career record: 98-73
- Career titles: 0 WTA, 9 ITF
- Highest ranking: No. 116 (20 August 1990)

Grand Slam doubles results
- French Open: 1R (1990)

Anne Aallonen (born 15 July 1967) is a Finnish-born Hong Kong former professional tennis player.

On 23 October 1989, she reached her highest WTA singles ranking of 179. On 20 August 1990, she also reached her highest WTA doubles ranking of 116.

Anne Aallonen debuted for the Finland Fed Cup team in 1985, winning her singles match in the tie against the Chinese Taipei Fed Cup team. In 1999 she competed for the Hong Kong Fed Cup team.

== ITF finals ==
=== Singles (0–1) ===
$100,000 tournaments
$75,000 tournaments
$50,000 tournaments
$25,000 tournaments
$10,000 tournaments

| Result | No. | Date | Tournament | Surface | Opponent | Score |
|---|---|---|---|---|---|---|
| Loss | 1. | 23 January 1989 | Helsinki, Finland | Hard | (Finland) Petra Thorén | 3–6, 6–2, 4–6 |

=== Doubles Finals: 17 (9-8) ===
| Result | No. | Date | Tournament | Surface | Partner | Opponents | Score |
|---|---|---|---|---|---|---|---|
| Win | 1. | 18 September 1986 | Murcia, Spain | Clay | (Hong Kong) Patricia Hy | (Mexico) Lucila Becerra (Mexico) Maluca Llamas | 7–6, 6–3 |
| Loss | 2. | 14 September 1987 | Sofia, Bulgaria | Clay | (United Kingdom) Evelyn Larwig | (Czechoslovakia) Michaela Frimmelová (Czechoslovakia) Petra Langrová | 2–6, 2–6 |
| Win | 3. | 7 March 1988 | Haifa, Israel | Hard | (Sweden) Lena Sandin | (Israel) Ilana Berger (Israel) Yael Segal | 6–1, 7–5 |
| Win | 4. | 14 March 1988 | Ashkelon, Israel | Hard | (Sweden) Lena Sandin | (Republic of Ireland) Lesley O'Halloran (United States) Heidi Rosenbaum | 6–4, 6–2 |
| Win | 5. | 21 March 1988 | Ramat HaSharon, Israel | Hard | (Sweden) Lena Sandin | (Sweden) Eva Lena Olsson (Romania) Diane Samungi | 7–5, 6–3 |
| Loss | 6. | 19 June 1988 | Salerno, Italy | Clay | (Indonesia) Yayuk Basuki | (Soviet Union) Eugenia Maniokova (Soviet Union) Viktoria Milvidskaia | 6–1, 5–7, 4–6 |
| Loss | 7. | 5 September 1988 | Agliana, Italy | Clay | (Finland) Nanne Dahlman | (Italy) Marzia Grossi (Italy) Barbara Romanò | 6–4, 6–7, 4–6 |
| Win | 8. | 17 October 1988 | Azores, Portugal | Hard | (Sweden) Helena Dahlström | (United Kingdom) Caroline Billingham (United Kingdom) Alexandra Niepel | 6–3, 6–3 |
| Loss | 9. | 15 May 1989 | Jaffa, Israel | Hard | (Brazil) Luciana Tella | (Israel) Ilana Berger (Spain) María José Llorca | 3–6, 2–6 |
| Win | 10. | 28 August 1989 | Arzachena, Italy | Hard | (Finland) Nanne Dahlman | (Spain) Rosa Bielsa (Spain) Janet Souto | 6–1, 6–1 |
| Win | 11. | 11 September 1989 | Telford, United Kingdom | Hard | (Netherlands) Simone Schilder | (South Africa) Linda Barnard (South Africa) Lise Gregory | 6–3, 7–6 |
| Win | 12. | 12 April 1989 | São Paulo, Brazil | Clay | (Netherlands) Simone Schilder | (Brazil) Luciana Tella (Brazil) Andrea Vieira | 7–5, 6–4 |
| Loss | 13. | 12 November 1990 | Swindon, United Kingdom | Carpet | (Soviet Union) Eugenia Maniokova | (Sweden) Maria Lindstrom (United States) Heather Ludloff | 6–4, 4–6, 6–7 |
| Win | 14. | 8 April 1991 | Limoges, France | Carpet | (Soviet Union) Eugenia Maniokova | (Spain) Rosa Bielsa (Spain) Janet Souto | 6–3, 1–6, 7–5 |
| Loss | 15. | 22 April 1991 | Ramat HaSharon, Israel | Hard | (Netherlands) Simone Schilder | (United Kingdom) Julie Salmon (Israel) Ilana Berger | 4–6, 4–6 |
| Loss | 16. | 5 August 1991 | Vigo, Spain | Clay | (United Kingdom) Belinda Borneo | (Spain) Eva Bes (Spain) Virginia Ruano Pascual | 6–7^{(6–8)}, 5–7 |
| Loss | 17. | 13 January 1992 | Helsinki, Finland | Carpet (i) | (Finland) Marja-Liisa Kuurne | (Sweden) Åsa Carlsson (Sweden) Marielle Wallin | 6–0, 5–7, 2–6 |
