= Gaby Castro =

Argentine tennis player

- Full name: Gabriela Castro
- Country (sports): Argentina
- Born: 11 July 1966 (age 58)
- Prize money: $34,582

Singles
- Highest ranking: No. 230 (18 July 1988)

Doubles
- Highest ranking: No. 73 (16 July 1990)

Grand Slam doubles results
- French Open: 3R (1990)
- US Open: 1R (1989)

Grand Slam mixed doubles results
- French Open: 1R (1984)

Gabriela Castro (born 11 July 1966) is an Argentine former professional tennis player.

== Biography ==
Castro was a top 100 doubles player and had her most successful period on the WTA Tour when she became the doubles partner of Conchita Martínez in 1989. The pair were runners-up at the Estoril Open and won two ITF $25,000 titles that year. At the 1990 French Open, Castro and Martínez made the round of 16, beating third seeds and former Wimbledon champions Kathy Jordan and Liz Smylie en route. When Castro retired from the tour in 1990 she became Martínez's coach.

Since 2012, Castro has been a director and coach at CEI Tennis in Buenos Aires. She operates the centre with Spanish former professional player Ana Almansa, who runs the Barcelona venue.

== WTA Tour finals ==
=== Doubles (0–1) ===
Result	Date	Tournament	Surface	Partner	Opponents	Score
Loss	Jul 1989	Estoril, Portugal	Clay	(Spain) Conchita Martínez	(Czechoslovakia) Iva Budařová (Czechoslovakia) Regina Rajchrtová	2–6, 4–6

== ITF finals ==
$25,000 tournaments
$10,000 tournaments

=== Singles (0–2) ===
Result	No.	Date	Tournament	Surface	Opponent	Score
Loss	1.	29 November 1987	Buenos Aires, Argentina	Clay	(Argentina) Cristina Tessi	3–6, 1–6
Loss	2.	30 May 1988	Adria, Italy	Clay	(Spain) Inmaculada Varas	5–7, 6–3, 3–6

=== Doubles (3–4) ===
Result	No.	Date	Tournament	Surface	Partner	Opponents	Score
Loss	1.	24 August 1987	Porto, Portugal	Clay	(Spain) Ana Segura	(Spain) Janet Souto (Spain) Ninoska Souto	6–4, 2–6, 0–6
Win	1.	31 August 1987	Vilamoura, Portugal	Clay	(Spain) Ana Segura	(Switzerland) Sandrine Jaquet (Switzerland) Andrea Martinelli	6–2, 6–1
Loss	2.	21 March 1988	Reims, France	Clay	(Spain) Ana Segura	(Brazil) Luciana Tella (Brazil) Andrea Vieira	3–6, 7–5, 2–6
Loss	3.	4 April 1988	Bari, Italy	Clay	(Spain) Ana Segura	(Czechoslovakia) Michaela Frimmelová (Czechoslovakia) Petra Langrová	4–6, 5–7
Loss	4.	15 August 1988	Caltagirone, Italy	Clay	(Spain) Ana Segura	(Spain) Janet Souto (Netherlands) Titia Wilmink	4–6, 2–6
Win	2.	18 June 1989	Modena, Italy	Clay	(Spain) Conchita Martínez	(Argentina) Debora Garat (Argentina) Florencia Labat	6–3, 6–2
Win	3.	26 June 1989	Arezzo, Italy	Clay	(Spain) Conchita Martínez	(United States) Anne Grousbeck (Japan) Ei Iida	w/o
