= Andrea Vieira =

Brazilian tennis player

- Country (sports): Brazil
- Born: 5 February 1971 (age 55) São Paulo, Brazil
- Prize money: $217,539

Singles
- Career record: 226–150
- Career titles: 11 ITF
- Highest ranking: No. 76 (6 November 1989)

Grand Slam singles results
- French Open: 3R (1989)
- Wimbledon: 1R (1990)
- US Open: 1R (1989, 1993)

Other tournaments
- Olympic Games: 1R (1992)

Doubles
- Career record: 114–82
- Career titles: 13 ITF
- Highest ranking: No. 134 (29 April 1991)

Grand Slam doubles results
- French Open: 1R (1988, 1990)

Other doubles tournaments
- Olympic Games: 2R (1992)

Andrea Chahad Guedes Vieira, also known as Dadá Vieira (born 5 February 1971) is a former tennis player from Brazil.

She upset Hana Mandlikova, who was seeded 14th in the women’s singles draw, in the first round of the 1989 French Open and reached the third round of that tournament. That November, she reached a career-best ranking of world No. 76. She also represented Brazil in the 1992 Summer Olympics.

== WTA career finals ==
=== Doubles: 1 runner-up ===
Result	No.	Date	Tournament	Surface	Partner	Opponents	Score
Loss	1.	Oct 1993	Brasil Open	Clay	(Brazil) Cláudia Chabalgoity	(Germany) Sabine Hack (Germany) Veronika Martinek	2–6, 6–7^{(4)}

== ITF finals ==
$75,000 tournaments
$50,000 tournaments
$25,000 tournaments
$10,000 tournaments

=== Singles: 14 (11–3) ===
Result	No.	Date	Tournament	Surface	Opponent	Score
Win	1.	6 September 1987	ITF Caracas, Venezuela	Clay	(Brazil) Gisele Faria	7–6^{(5)}, 6–3
Win	2.	14 September 1987	ITF Medellín, Colombia	Clay	(Brazil) Luciana Tella	6–1, 6–3
Win	3.	21 September 1987	ITF Lima, Peru	Clay	(Chile) Macarena Miranda	6–3, 7–5
Loss	4.	1 November 1987	ITF São Paulo, Brazil	Clay	(Brazil) Niege Dias	6–2, 3–6, 1–6
Loss	5.	11 April 1988	ITF Caserta, Italy	Clay	(Italy) Cathy Caverzasio	2–6, 6–3, 5–7
Win	6.	19 November 1990	ITF Florianópolis, Brazil	Clay	(Austria) Désirée Leupold	6–4, 6–4
Win	7.	1 September 1991	ITF Belo Horizonte, Brazil	Clay	(Argentina) María José Gaidano	6–3, 6–4
Win	8.	2 September 1991	ITF São Paulo, Brazil	Clay	(Chile) Macarena Miranda	6–3, 4–6, 6–3
Win	9.	30 October 1994	ITF São Paulo, Brazil	Clay	(Brazil) Luciana Tella	6–1, 6–4
Win	10.	17 July 1995	ITF Santos, Brazil	Clay	(Dominican Republic) Joelle Schad	6–2, 6–2
Win	11.	26 November 1995	ITF São Paulo, Brazil	Clay	(United States) Meghann Shaughnessy	6–2, 6–1
Win	12.	1 July 1996	ITF Santos, Brazil	Clay	(Dominican Republic) Joelle Schad	6–2, 2–6, 7–6^{(9)}
Win	13.	27 October 1996	ITF Rio Grande do Sul, Brazil	Hard	(Brazil) Vanessa Menga	6–0, 6–2
Loss	14.	10 November 1996	ITF São Paulo, Brazil	Clay	(Argentina) Mariana Díaz Oliva	5–7, 3–6

=== Doubles: 21 (13–8) ===
Result	No.	Date	Tournament	Surface	Partner	Opponents	Score
Win	1.	12 October 1986	ITF Medellín, Colombia	Clay	(Argentina) Andrea Tiezzi	(United States) Tracie Blumentritt (United States) Brenda Niemeyer	4–6, 6–0, 6–2
Win	2.	7 September 1987	Bogotá, Colombia	Clay	(Brazil) Luciana Tella	(Chile) Carolina Espinoza (Chile) Macarena Miranda	7–5, 7–5
Win	3.	14 September 1987	Medellín, Colombia	Clay	(Brazil) Luciana Tella	(Chile) Macarena Miranda (Argentina) Andrea Tiezzi	4–6, 7–5, 6–3
Win	4.	21 September 1987	Lima, Peru	Clay	(Brazil) Luciana Tella	(Chile) Macarena Miranda (Argentina) Andrea Tiezzi	7–6, 6–3
Win	5.	21 March 1988	Reims, France	Clay	(Brazil) Luciana Tella	(Argentina) Gaby Castro (Spain) Ana Segura	6–3, 5–7, 6–2
Loss	6.	12 April 1989	São Paulo, Brazil	Clay	(Brazil) Luciana Tella	(Finland) Anne Aallonen (Netherlands) Simone Schilder	5–7, 4–6
Loss	7.	13 August 1990	Brasília, Brazil	Clay	(Brazil) Luciana Tella	(Denmark) Sofie Albinus (United Kingdom) Samantha Smith	6–7^{(2)}, 6–4, 3–6
Winner	8.	15 April 1991	Caserta, Italy	Clay	(Argentina) Inés Gorrochategui	(United States) Jennifer Fuchs (Sweden) Maria Strandlund	6–2, 6–2
Win	9.	1 September 1991	Belo Horizonte, Brazil	Clay	(Brazil) Denia Salu	(Brazil) Roberta Burzagli (Brazil) Eugenia Maia	4–6, 7–5, 6–4
Loss	10.	25 November 1991	Porto Alegre, Brazil	Clay	(Brazil) Luciana Corsato-Owsianka	(France) Sybille Niox-Château (Spain) Silvia Ramón-Cortés	4–6, 3–6
Loss	11.	21 June 1992	Milan, Italy	Clay	(Brazil) Luciana Tella	(Japan) Kyōko Nagatsuka (Japan) Miki Yokobori	6–3, 1–6, 3–6
Win	12.	30 October 1994	São Paulo, Brazil	Clay	(Brazil) Luciana Tella	(Brazil) Miriam D'Agostini (Brazil) Vanessa Menga	4–6, 6–3, 6–1
Win	13.	13 February 1995	Bogotá, Colombia	Clay	(Argentina) María José Gaidano	(United Kingdom) Joanne Moore (Colombia) Ximena Rodríguez	6–4, 1–6, 6–1
Winner	14.	31 July 1995	Brasília, Brazil	Clay	(Brazil) Vanessa Menga	(Argentina) Geraldine Aizenberg (Dominican Republic) Joelle Schad	6–4, 6–2
Winner	15.	20 November 1995	São Paulo, Brazil	Clay	(Brazil) Vanessa Menga	(Brazil) Eugenia Maia (Brazil) Luciana Tella	7–6^{(3)}, 6–3
Loss	16.	5 May 1996	Florianópolis, Brazil	Clay	(Brazil) Miriam D'Agostini	(Argentina) Florencia Cianfagna (Monaco) Emmanuelle Gagliardi	6–4, 4–6, 4–6
Winner	17.	1 July 1996	Santos, Brazil	Clay	(Brazil) Luciana Tella	(Brazil) Vanessa Menga (Dominican Republic) Joelle Schad	3–6, 6–1, 6–3
Winner	18.	27 October 1996	Rio Grande do Sul, Brazil	Clay	(Brazil) Miriam D'Agostini	(Brazil) Roberta Burzagli (Brazil) Luciana Della Casa	6–7^{(5)}, 6–3, 6–0
Loss	19.	10 November 1996	São Paulo, Brazil	Clay	(Brazil) Miriam D'Agostini	(Argentina) Mariana Diaz-Oliva (Paraguay) Larissa Schaerer	6–3, 4–6, 2–6
Loss	20.	1 December 1996	São Paulo, Brazil	Clay	(Brazil) Miriam D'Agostini	(Argentina) Laura Montalvo (Brazil) Luciana Tella	3–6, 4–6
Loss	21.	7 November 2005	ITF São Paulo, Brazil	Hard	(Brazil) Vanessa Menga	(Brazil) Ana Clara Duarte (Brazil) Roxane Vaisemberg	6–3, 5–7, 4–6
