= Arantxa Sánchez Vicario =

Spanish former tennis player (born 1971)

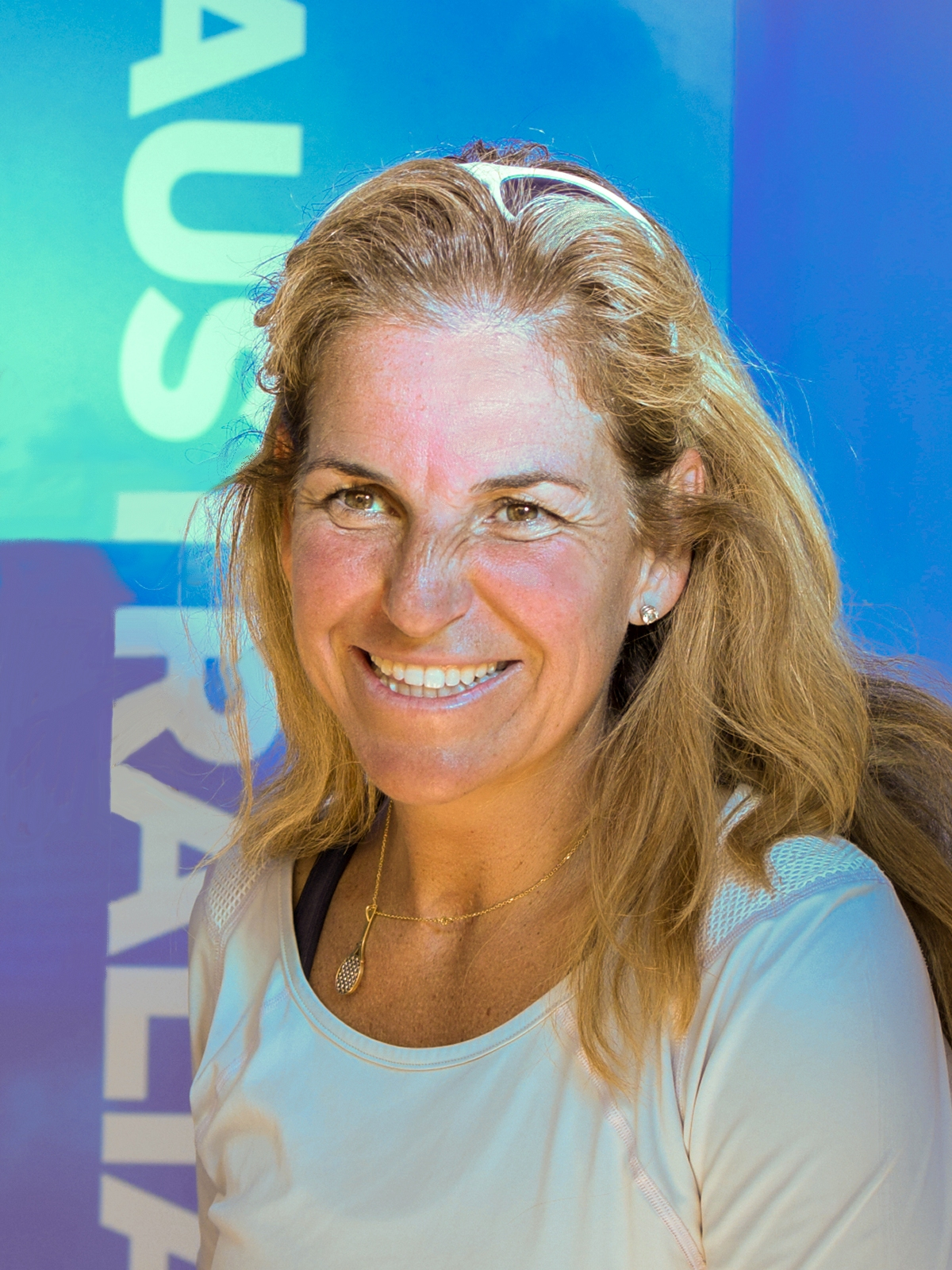
- Arantxa Sánchez Vicario at the 2016 Australian Open
- Full name: Aránzazu Isabel María Sánchez Vicario
- Country (sports): Spain
- Residence: Barcelona, Spain
- Born: 18 December 1971 (age 54) Barcelona, Spain
- Height: 1.69 m (5 ft 7 in)
- Turned pro: 1985
- Retired: 2002
- Plays: Right-handed (two-handed backhand)
- Prize money: $16,942,640: 36th in all-time rankings (female)
- Int. Tennis HoF: 2007 (member page)

Singles
- Career record: 764–296 72.07%
- Career titles: 29
- Highest ranking: No. 1 (6 February 1995)

Grand Slam singles results
- Australian Open: F (1994, 1995)
- French Open: W (1989, 1994, 1998)
- Wimbledon: F (1995, 1996)
- US Open: W (1994)

Other tournaments
- Grand Slam Cup: QF (1998, 1999)
- Tour Finals: F (1993)

Doubles
- Career record: 676–224
- Career titles: 69
- Highest ranking: No. 1 (19 October 1992)

Grand Slam doubles results
- Australian Open: W (1992, 1995, 1996)
- French Open: F (1992, 1995)
- Wimbledon: W (1995)
- US Open: W (1993, 1994)

Other doubles tournaments
- Tour Finals: W (1992, 1995)

Mixed doubles
- Career record: 68–29
- Career titles: 4

Grand Slam mixed doubles results
- Australian Open: W (1993)
- French Open: W (1990, 1992)
- Wimbledon: 3R (1990)
- US Open: W (2000)

Team competitions
- Fed Cup: W (1991, 1993, 1994, 1995, 1998)
- Hopman Cup: W (1990, 2002)

Coaching career (2015–)
- Caroline Wozniacki (2015)
Medal record
Olympic Games
Silver medal – second place	1992 Barcelona	Doubles
Silver medal – second place	1996 Atlanta	Singles
Bronze medal – third place	1992 Barcelona	Singles
Bronze medal – third place	1996 Atlanta	Doubles

Aránzazu Isabel María "Arantxa" Sánchez Vicario (Spanish pronunciation: [aˈɾanθaθw isaˈβel maˈɾi.a aˈɾantʃa ˈsantʃeθ βiˈkaɾjo]; (Note: In isolation, Vicario is pronounced [biˈkaɾjo].) born 18 December 1971) is a Spanish former professional tennis player. She was ranked as the world No. 1 in women's singles by the Women's Tennis Association (WTA) for 12 weeks, as well as the world No. 1 in women's doubles for 111 weeks. A defensive baseliner, Sánchez Vicario won 29 WTA Tour-level singles titles and 69 doubles titles, including 14 major titles: four in singles, six in women's doubles, and four in mixed doubles. She also won four Olympic medals and five Fed Cup titles representing Spain. In 1994, Sánchez Vicario was crowned the ITF World Champion of the year.

== Career ==
Arantxa Sánchez Vicario started playing tennis at the age of four, when she followed her older brothers Emilio Sánchez and Javier Sánchez (both of whom became professional players) to the court and hit balls against the wall with her first racquet. As a 17-year-old, she became the youngest winner of the women's singles title at the 1989 French Open, defeating World No. 1 Steffi Graf in the final. (Monica Seles broke the record the following year when she won the title at age 16.)

Sánchez Vicario quickly developed a reputation on the tour for her tenacity and refusal to concede a point. Commentator Bud Collins described her as "unceasing in determined pursuit of tennis balls, none seeming too distant to be retrieved in some manner and returned again and again to demoralize opponents" and nicknamed her the "Barcelona Bumblebee".

She won six women's doubles Grand Slam titles, including the US Open in 1993 (with Helena Suková) and Wimbledon in 1995 (with Jana Novotná). She also won four Grand Slam mixed doubles titles. In 1991, she helped Spain win its first-ever Fed Cup title, and helped Spain win the Fed Cup in 1993, 1994, 1995, and 1998. Sánchez Vicario holds the records for the most matches won by a player in Fed Cup competition (72) and for most ties played (58). She was ITF world champion in 1994 in singles. She was also a member of the Spanish teams that won the Hopman Cup in 1990 and 2002.

Over the course of her career, she won 29 singles titles and 69 doubles titles before retiring in November 2002. She came out of retirement in 2004 to play doubles in a few select tournaments as well as the 2004 Summer Olympics, where she became the only tennis player to play in five Olympics in the Games' history. Sánchez Vicario was the most decorated Olympian in Spanish history with four medals—two silver and two bronze. Her medal count has since been surpassed by David Cal and Saúl Craviotto with five medals each.

In 2005, TENNIS magazine ranked her in 27th place in its list of 40 Greatest Players of the TENNIS era and in 2007, she was inducted into the International Tennis Hall of Fame. She was only the third Spanish player (and the first Spanish woman) to be inducted.

In 2009, Sánchez Vicario was present at the opening ceremony of Madrid's Caja Mágica, the new venue for the Madrid Masters. The second show court is named Court Arantxa Sánchez Vicario in her honour.

== Personal life ==
She has been married twice: her first marriage to the sports writer Juan Vehils in July 2000 ended in 2001. She then married businessman Josep Santacana in September 2008, with whom she has a daughter (born 2009) and son (born 2011). In 2019, Sánchez Vicario and Santacana divorced.

In 2012, Sánchez Vicario published an autobiography in which she claimed that, despite having earned $60 million over the course of her career, her parents had exerted almost total control over her finances and lost all of her money. The same year, Sánchez Vicario sued her father and older brother Javier for the alleged mishandling of her career earnings. The court case continued over three years and in 2015 concluded in a private settlement.

She has faced multiple court proceedings relating to charges of tax evasion and fraud. Between 1989 and 1993, she had falsely claimed to be resident of Andorra for tax purposes but was actually residing in Barcelona, Spain. As a result, she was ordered to pay back taxes and penalties. In 2009, Sánchez Vicario was found guilty of tax evasion and ordered to repay €3.5 million. In 2015, Banque de Luxembourg successfully filed complaint against her for credit and property fraud amounting to $5.2 million; however, they were unable to recoup it. In 2018, Sánchez Vicario was once again charged with fraud, for deliberately misleading the courts on her financial set-up during the previous case. As of 2021, Barcelona prosecutors are seeking a four-year jail term for Sánchez Vicario, due to further allegations of fraud relating to the transfer of assets to avoid paying her debts from a previous lawsuit. In 2024, she received a suspended sentence.

As well as tennis-playing siblings Javier and Emilio, Sánchez Vicario also has an older sister—Marisa—who briefly played professional tennis, peaking at world no. 368 in 1990.

== Career statistics ==
=== Grand Slam performance timelines ===
Key
W	F	SF	QF	#R	RR	Q#	P#	DNQ	A	Z#	PO	G	S	B	NMS	NTI	P	NH

(W) winner; (F) finalist; (SF) semifinalist; (QF) quarterfinalist; (#R) rounds 4, 3, 2, 1; (RR) round-robin stage; (Q#) qualification round; (P#) preliminary round; (DNQ) did not qualify; (A) absent; (Z#) Davis/Fed Cup Zonal Group (with number indication) or (PO) play-off; (G) gold, (S) silver or (B) bronze Olympic/Paralympic medal; (NMS) not a Masters tournament; (NTI) not a Tier I tournament; (P) postponed; (NH) not held; (SR) strike rate (events won / competed); (W–L) win–loss record.
To avoid confusion and double counting, these charts are updated at the conclusion of a tournament or when the player's participation has ended.

==== Singles ====
Tournament	1986	1987	1988	1989	1990	1991	1992	1993	1994	1995	1996	1997	1998	1999	2000	2001	2002	SR	W–L
Australian Open	NH	A	A	A	A	SF	SF	SF	F	F	QF	3R	QF	2R	QF	A	1R	0 / 11	41–11
French Open	Q1	QF	QF	W	2R	F	SF	SF	W	F	F	QF	W	SF	SF	2R	1R	3 / 16	72–13
Wimbledon	A	1R	1R	QF	1R	QF	2R	4R	4R	F	F	SF	QF	2R	4R	2R	A	0 / 15	41–15
US Open	A	1R	4R	QF	SF	QF	F	SF	W	4R	4R	QF	QF	4R	4R	3R	1R	1 / 16	56–15
Win–loss	0–0	4–3	7–3	15–2	6–3	19–4	16–4	18–4	23–2	21–4	19–4	15–4	19–3	9-4	15–4	4–3	0–3	4 / 58	210–54

==== Doubles ====
Tournament	1987	1988	1989	1990	1991	1992	1993	1994	1995	1996	1997	1998	1999	2000	2001	2002	2003	2004	2005	Career SR
Australian Open	A	A	A	A	3R	W	QF	SF	W	W	SF	QF	QF	1R	A	F	A	A	A	3 / 11
French Open	3R	1R	QF	QF	SF	F	QF	A	F	SF	SF	SF	QF	1R	1R	1R	A	1R	1R	0 / 17
Wimbledon	1R	1R	1R	QF	QF	SF	QF	F	W	QF	QF	QF	3R	3R	QF	A	A	1R	A	1 / 16
US Open	2R	2R	1R	QF	3R	SF	W	W	QF	F	SF	3R	SF	3R	QF	1R	A	A	A	2 / 16
Grand Slam SR	0 / 3	0 / 3	0 / 3	0 / 3	0 / 4	1 / 4	1 / 4	1 / 3	2 / 4	1 / 4	0 / 4	0 / 4	0 / 4	0 / 4	0 / 3	0 / 3	0 / 0	0 / 2	0 / 1	6 / 60

=== Grand Slam finals ===
==== Singles: 12 (4 titles, 8 runners-up) ====
Result	Year	Championship	Surface	Opponent	Score
Win	1989	French Open	Clay	(West Germany) Steffi Graf	7–6^{(8–6)}, 3–6, 7–5
Loss	1991	French Open	Clay	(Socialist Federal Republic of Yugoslavia) Monica Seles	3–6, 4–6
Loss	1992	US Open	Hard	(Serbia and Montenegro) Monica Seles	3–6, 3–6
Loss	1994	Australian Open	Hard	(Germany) Steffi Graf	0–6, 2–6
Win	1994	French Open	Clay	(France) Mary Pierce	6–4, 6–4
Win	1994	US Open	Hard	(Germany) Steffi Graf	1–6, 7–6^{(7–3)}, 6–4
Loss	1995	Australian Open	Hard	(France) Mary Pierce	3–6, 2–6
Loss	1995	French Open	Clay	(Germany) Steffi Graf	5–7, 6–4, 0–6
Loss	1995	Wimbledon	Grass	(Germany) Steffi Graf	6–4, 1–6, 5–7
Loss	1996	French Open	Clay	(Germany) Steffi Graf	3–6, 7–6^{(7–4)}, 8–10
Loss	1996	Wimbledon	Grass	(Germany) Steffi Graf	3–6, 5–7
Win	1998	French Open	Clay	(United States) Monica Seles	7–6^{(7–5)}, 0–6, 6–2

==== Doubles: 11 (6 titles, 5 runners-up) ====
Result	Year	Championship	Surface	Partner	Opponents	Score
Win	1992	Australian Open	Hard	(Czechoslovakia) Helena Suková	(United States) Mary Joe Fernandez (United States) Zina Garrison	6–4, 7–6^{(7–3)}
Loss	1992	French Open	Clay	(Spain) Conchita Martínez	(United States) Gigi Fernández (Belarus) Natasha Zvereva	3–6, 2–6
Win	1993	US Open	Hard	(Czech Republic) Helena Suková	(South Africa) Amanda Coetzer (Argentina) Inés Gorrochategui	6–4, 6–2
Loss	1994	Wimbledon	Grass	(Czech Republic) Jana Novotná	(United States) Gigi Fernández (Belarus) Natasha Zvereva	4–6, 1–6
Win	1994	US Open	Hard	(Czech Republic) Jana Novotná	(Bulgaria) Katerina Maleeva (United States) Robin White	6–3, 6–3
Win	1995	Australian Open	Hard	(Czech Republic) Jana Novotná	(United States) Gigi Fernández (Belarus) Natasha Zvereva	6–3, 6–7^{(3–7)}, 6–4
Loss	1995	French Open	Clay	(Czech Republic) Jana Novotná	(United States) Gigi Fernández (Belarus) Natasha Zvereva	7–6^{(8–6)}, 4–6, 5–7
Win	1995	Wimbledon	Grass	(Czech Republic) Jana Novotná	(United States) Gigi Fernández (Belarus) Natasha Zvereva	5–7, 7–5, 6–4
Win	1996	Australian Open	Hard	(United States) Chanda Rubin	(United States) Lindsay Davenport (United States) Mary Joe Fernandez	7–5, 2–6, 6–4
Loss	1996	US Open	Hard	(Czech Republic) Jana Novotná	(United States) Gigi Fernández (Belarus) Natasha Zvereva	6–1, 1–6, 4–6
Loss	2002	Australian Open	Hard	(Slovakia) Daniela Hantuchová	(Switzerland) Martina Hingis (Russia) Anna Kournikova	2–6, 7–6^{(7–4)}, 1–6

==== Mixed doubles: 8 (4 titles, 4 runners-up) ====
Result	Year	Championship	Surface	Partner	Opponents	Score
Loss	1989	French Open	Clay	(Argentina) Horacio de la Peña	(Netherlands) Manon Bollegraf (Netherlands) Tom Nijssen	3–6, 7–6, 2–6
Win	1990	French Open	Clay	(Mexico) Jorge Lozano	(Australia) Nicole Provis (South Africa) Danie Visser	7–6, 7–6
Loss	1991	US Open	Hard	(Spain) Emilio Sánchez	(Netherlands) Manon Bollegraf (Netherlands) Tom Nijssen	2–6, 6–7
Loss	1992	Australian Open	Hard	(Australia) Todd Woodbridge	(Australia) Nicole Provis (Australia) Mark Woodforde	3–6, 6–4, 9–11
Win	1992	French Open	Clay	(Australia) Todd Woodbridge	(United States) Lori McNeil (United States) Bryan Shelton	6–2, 6–3
Win	1993	Australian Open	Hard	(Australia) Todd Woodbridge	(United States) Zina Garrison (United States) Rick Leach	7–5, 6–4
Loss	2000	Australian Open	Hard	(Australia) Todd Woodbridge	(Australia) Rennae Stubbs (United States) Jared Palmer	5–7, 6–7
Win	2000	US Open	Hard	(United States) Jared Palmer	(Russia) Anna Kournikova (Belarus) Max Mirnyi	6–4, 6–3

=== Summer Olympics ===
==== Singles: 2 medals (1 silver medal, 1 bronze medal) ====
Result	Year	Championship	Surface	Opponent	Score
Bronze	1992	Barcelona	Clay	Tied	DNP
Silver	1996	Atlanta	Hard	(United States) Lindsay Davenport	6–7^{(8–10)}, 2–6

Note: Arantxa Sánchez Vicario lost in the semi-finals to Jennifer Capriati 3–6, 6–3, 1–6. In 1992, there was no bronze medal play-off match, both beaten semi-final players received bronze medals

==== Doubles: 2 medals (1 silver medal, 1 bronze medal) ====
Result	Year	Championship	Surface	Partner	Opponents	Score
Silver	1992	Barcelona	Clay	(Spain) Conchita Martínez	(United States) Gigi Fernández (United States) Mary Joe Fernandez	5–7, 6–2, 2–6
Bronze	1996	Atlanta	Hard	(Spain) Conchita Martínez	(Netherlands) Manon Bollegraf (Netherlands) Brenda Schultz	6–3, 6–1

=== Year-end championships finals ===
==== Singles: 1 (1 runner-up) ====
Result	Year	Championship	Surface	Opponent	Score
Loss	1993	New York City	Carpet	(Germany) Steffi Graf	1–6, 4–6, 6–3, 1–6

==== Doubles: 6 (2 titles, 4 runners-up) ====
Result	Year	Championship	Surface	Partner	Opponents	Score
Loss	1990	New York City	Carpet	(Argentina) Mercedes Paz	(United States) Kathy Jordan (Australia) Elizabeth Smylie	6–7^{(4–7)}, 4–6
Win	1992	New York City	Carpet	(Czechoslovakia) Helena Suková	(Latvia) Larisa Neiland (Czechoslovakia) Jana Novotná	7–6^{(7–4)}, 6–1
Loss	1994	New York City	Carpet	(Czech Republic) Jana Novotná	(United States) Gigi Fernández (Belarus) Natasha Zvereva	3–6, 7–6^{(7–4)}, 3–6
Win	1995	New York City	Carpet	(Czech Republic) Jana Novotná	(United States) Gigi Fernández (Belarus) Natasha Zvereva	6–2, 6–1
Loss	1996	New York City	Carpet	(Czech Republic) Jana Novotná	(United States) Lindsay Davenport (United States) Mary Joe Fernandez	3–6, 2–6
Loss	1999	New York City	Carpet	(Latvia) Larisa Neiland	(Switzerland) Martina Hingis (Russia) Anna Kournikova	4–6, 4–6

== See also ==
- WTA Awards
- World number 1 ranked female tennis players

== Notes ==
Sporting positions
Preceded by Steffi Graf; Steffi Graf; Steffi Graf	World No. 1; 6 February 1995 – 19 February 1995; 27 February 1995 – 9 April 1995; 15 May 1995 – 11 June 1995	Succeeded by Steffi Graf; Steffi Graf; Steffi Graf
Awards
Preceded by Steffi Graf	ITF World Champion; 1994	Succeeded by Steffi Graf
Preceded by (Spain) Spanish Marathon team	Prince of Asturias Award for Sports; 1998	Succeeded by (Germany) Steffi Graf
