= Luciana Tella =

Brazilian tennis player

- Full name: Luciana Camargo Tella
- Country (sports): Brazil
- Born: 31 December 1969 (age 55); Campinas, Brazil
- Prize money: $105,962

Singles
- Career record: 156–115
- Career titles: 7 ITF
- Highest ranking: No. 154 (6 March 1995)

Doubles
- Career record: 134–88
- Career titles: 14 ITF
- Highest ranking: No. 155 (23 May 1988)

Grand Slam doubles results
- French Open: 1R (1988)

Grand Slam mixed doubles results
- French Open: 2R (1988)
Medal record
Pan American Games
Bronze medal – third place	1995 Mar del Plata	Doubles

Luciana Camargo Tella (born 31 December 1969) is a former professional tennis player from Brazil.

== Biography ==
Born in Campinas, Tella first appeared on the WTA Tour in the 1986 season and went on to reach a top ranking 154 in the world in singles.

At the 1988 French Open, she competed in the main draw of both the women's doubles and mixed doubles events.

She featured in a total of 19 Fed Cup ties for Brazil, which included World Group fixtures against Czechoslovakia in 1988 and Canada in 1989.

Her representative career included appearing at the 1995 Pan American Games in Mar del Plata, where she partnered with Andrea Vieira to win a bronze medal in the women's doubles.

Since 1998, she has run the Tella Tennis Academy in Campinas.

== ITF Circuit finals ==
$25,000 tournaments
$10,000 tournaments

=== Singles: 15 (7–8) ===
Result	No.	Date	Tournament	Surface	Opponent	Score
Loss	1.	28 September 1986	ITF Caracas, Venezuela	Hard	(United States) Tracie Blumentritt	3–6, 6–4, 5–7
Loss	2.	6 December 1986	ITF Rio de Janeiro, Brazil	Clay	(Argentina) Natacha Marcucci	4–6, 6–7
Win	1.	7 September 1987	ITF Bogotá, Colombia	Clay	(Switzerland) Michèle Strebel	3–6, 6–4, 2–0 ret.
Loss	3.	14 September 1987	ITF Medellín, Colombia	Clay	(Brazil) Andrea Vieira	1–6, 3–6
Win	2.	18 September 1988	ITF Medellín, Colombia	Clay	(United States) Paloma Collantes	7–5, 6–1
Win	3.	26 September 1988	ITF Bogota, Colombia	Clay	(Denmark) Karin Ptaszek	6–4, 4–6, 6–2
Loss	4.	15 May 1989	ITF Jaffa, Israel	Hard	(Finland) Petra Thorén	5–7, 2–6
Loss	5.	1 June 1992	ITF Brindisi, Italy	Clay	(Italy) Flora Perfetti	5–7, 3–6
Win	4.	10 May 1993	ITF San Luis Potosí, Mexico	Clay	(United States) Sandra Cacic	6–4, 6–3
Loss	6.	16 May 1993	ITF León, Mexico	Clay	(United States) Sandra Cacic	4–6, 7–5, 1–6
Win	5.	9 October 1994	ITF La Paz, Bolivia	Clay	(Peru) Carla Rodríguez	6–0, 6–1
Loss	7.	30 October 1994	ITF São Paulo, Brazil	Clay	(Brazil) Andrea Vieira	1–6, 4–6
Loss	8.	21 November 1994	ITF La Plata, Argentina	Clay	(France) Lea Ghirardi	5–7, 1–6
Win	6.	28 November 1994	ITF São Paulo, Brazil	Hard	(Brazil) Eugenia Maia	6–3, 6–2
Win	7.	19 February 1995	ITF Bogotá, Colombia	Clay	(Brazil) Miriam D'Agostini	6–3, 7–6^{(7–5)}

=== Doubles: 24 (14–10) ===
Result	No.	Date	Tournament	Surface	Partner	Opponents	Score
Loss	1.	6 December 1986	ITF Rio de Janeiro, Brazil	Clay	(Brazil) Claudia Tella	(Brazil) Gisele Faria (Brazil) Adriana Florido	6–4, 6–7, 2–6
Win	1.	7 September 1987	ITF Bogotá, Colombia	Clay	(Brazil) Andrea Vieira	(Chile) Carolina Espinoza (Chile) Macarena Miranda	7–5, 7–5
Win	2.	14 September 1987	ITF Medellín, Colombia	Clay	(Brazil) Andrea Vieira	(Chile) Macarena Miranda (Argentina) Andrea Tiezzi	4–6, 7–5, 6–3
Win	3.	21 September 1987	ITF Lima, Peru	Clay	(Brazil) Andrea Vieira	(Chile) Macarena Miranda (Argentina) Andrea Tiezzi	7–6, 6–3
Win	4.	21 March 1988	Reims, France	Clay	(Brazil) Andrea Vieira	(Argentina) Gaby Castro (Spain) Ana Segura	6–3, 5–7, 6–2
Loss	2.	18 April 1988	Reggio Emilia, Italy	Clay	(Switzerland) Michèle Strebel	(Netherlands) Hellas ter Riet (United States) Jennifer Fuchs	0–6, 4–6
Win	5.	25 September 1988	Medellín, Colombia	Clay	(Brazil) Gisele Faria	(Denmark) Henriette Kjær Nielsen (Denmark) Anja Michailoff	0–6, 6–4, 6–3
Win	6.	2 October 1988	Bogotá, Colombia	Clay	(Brazil) Gisele Faria	(United States) Paloma Collantes (Brazil) Alessandra Kaul	1–6, 6–3, 6–1
Loss	3.	15 May 1989	Jaffa, Israel	Hard	(Finland) Anne Aallonen	(Israel) Ilana Berger (Spain) María José Llorca	3–6, 2–6
Loss	4.	3 July 1989	Vaihingen, West Germany	Clay	(Argentina) Andrea Tiezzi	(West Germany) Anouschka Popp (Hungary) Réka Szikszay	5–7, 4–6
Loss	5.	4 December 1989	São Paulo, Brazil	Clay	(Brazil) Andrea Vieira	(Finland) Anne Aallonen (Netherlands) Simone Schilder	5–7, 4–6
Loss	6.	13 August 1990	Brasília, Brazil	Clay	(Brazil) Andrea Vieira	(Denmark) Sofie Albinus (United Kingdom) Samantha Smith	6–7^{(2–7)}, 6–4, 3–6
Win	7.	12 November 1990	Porto Alegre, Brazil	Clay	(Brazil) Cláudia Chabalgoity	(United States) Anne Grousbeck (Sri Lanka) Lihini Weerasuriya	6–1, 6–1
Loss	7.	21 June 1992	Milan, Italy	Clay	(Brazil) Andrea Vieira	(Japan) Kyōko Nagatsuka (Japan) Miki Yokobori	6–3, 1–6, 3–6
Loss	8.	19 September 1994	Guayaquil, Ecuador	Clay	(Brazil) Vanessa Menga	(Chile) Paula Cabezas (Puerto Rico) Emilie Viqueira	4–6, 4–6
Win	8.	26 September 1994	ITF Lima, Peru	Clay	(Brazil) Vanessa Menga	(Peru) Laura Arraya (Peru) María Eugenia Rojas	6–4, 6–3
Win	9.	30 October 1994	ITF São Paulo, Brazil	Clay	(Brazil) Andrea Vieira	(Brazil) Miriam D'Agostini (Brazil) Vanessa Menga	4–6, 6–3, 6–1
Win	10.	28 November 1994	ITF São Paulo, Brazil	Clay	(Brazil) Vanessa Menga	(Colombia) Carmiña Giraldo (Costa Rica) Paula Umaña	6–2, 6–3
Loss	9.	20 November 1995	ITF São Paulo, Brazil	Clay	(Brazil) Eugenia Maia	(Brazil) Vanessa Menga (Brazil) Andrea Vieira	6–7^{(3–7)}, 3–6
Win	11.	4 December 1995	ITF São Paulo, Brazil	Hard	(Brazil) Vanessa Menga	(South Africa) Nannie de Villiers (Hungary) Katalin Marosi	6–3, 6–2
Win	12.	1 July 1996	ITF Santos, Brazil	Clay	(Brazil) Andrea Vieira	(Brazil) Vanessa Menga (Dominican Republic) Joelle Schad	3–6, 6–1, 6–3
Loss	10.	8 July 1996	ITF São Paulo, Brazil	Clay	(Brazil) Renata Diez	(Brazil) Vanessa Menga (Dominican Republic) Joelle Schad	7–6^{(8–6)}, 3–6, 2–6
Win	13.	1 December 1996	ITF São Paulo, Brazil	Clay	(Argentina) Laura Montalvo	(Brazil) Miriam D'Agostini (Brazil) Andrea Vieira	6–3, 6–4
Win	14.	8 December 1996	ITF São Paulo, Brazil	Clay	(Argentina) Laura Montalvo	(United States) Susie Starrett (United States) Paige Yaroshuk	2–6, 6–3, 7–5
