= Rosa Bielsa =

Spanish tennis player (born 1966)

- Full name: Rosa Bielsa-Hierro
- Country (sports): Spain
- Born: 9 January 1966 (age 59)
- Prize money: $36,823

Singles
- Highest ranking: No. 230 (11 September 1989)

Doubles
- Highest ranking: No. 176 (7 November 1988)

Grand Slam doubles results
- French Open: 1R (1989)
Medal record
Universiade
Bronze medal – third place	1991 Sheffield	Women's singles
Bronze medal – third place	1991 Sheffield	Mixed doubles

Rosa Bielsa-Hierro (born 9 January 1966) is a Spanish former professional tennis player.

== Biography ==
Bielsa competed in two Federation Cup ties for Spain, both in the 1985 edition, as the doubles partner of Ana Almansa. The pair won the deciding doubles rubber against Hong Kong, to advance to a second round fixture against Australia, which they and their teammates lost 0–3.

At the 1989 French Open she lost in the qualifying draw for the singles but featured in the main draw of the women's doubles, with Soviet player Eugenia Maniokova.

Bielsa won two medals for Spain at the 1991 Summer Universiade in Sheffield, a bronze in the singles and a bronze in the mixed doubles.

In 1996 she was a member of the Spanish women's team which finished runner-up in the Padel Tennis World Championship.

== ITF finals ==
=== Singles (0–2) ===
Legend
$25,000 tournaments
$10,000 / $15,000 tournaments

Result	No.	Date	Tournament	Surface	Opponent	Score
Loss	1.	12 September 1988	Arzachena, Italy	Clay	(Italy) Laura Golarsa	2–6, 2–6
Loss	2.	18 March 1991	Alicante, Spain	Clay	(Norway) Amy Jönsson Raaholt	4–6, 5–7

=== Doubles (8–10) ===
Result	No.	Date	Tournament	Surface	Partner	Opponents	Score
Loss	1.	28 July 1986	Sezze, Italy	Clay	(Spain) Elena Guerra	(Spain) Ninoska Souto (Spain) Janet Souto	3–6, 6–7
Win	2.	4 May 1987	Bournemouth, United Kingdom	Hard	(Spain) Ana Segura	(Denmark) Lone Vandborg (Netherlands) Titia Wilmink	6–4, 7–5
Loss	3.	29 June 1987	Brindisi, Italy	Clay	(Spain) Elena Guerra	(Australia) Michelle Bowrey (Australia) Kristine Kunce	3–6, 6–7
Win	4.	21 September 1987	Valencia, Spain	Clay	(Spain) Elena Guerra	(Spain) María José Llorca (Spain) Inmaculada Varas	6–3, 3–6, 6–3
Loss	5.	29 February 1988	Rocafort, Spain	Clay	(Spain) Elena Guerra	(Austria) Bettina Diesner (United Kingdom) Anne Simpkin	3–6, 2–6
Win	6.	8 August 1988	Palermo, Italy	Clay	(Spain) Janet Souto	(United States) Allison Cooper (United States) Mary Norwood	6–3, 2–6, 7–5
Loss	6.	29 August 1988	Corsica, France	Clay	(Spain) Janet Souto	(Austria) Bettina Diesner (Switzerland) Mareke Plocher	1–6, 4–6
Loss	7.	12 September 1988	Arzachena, Italy	Hard	(Spain) Janet Souto	(United States) Anne Grousbeck (Australia) Tracey Morton	5–7, 1–6
Loss	8.	28 August 1989	Arzachena, Italy	Hard	(Spain) Janet Souto	(Finland) Anne Aallonen (Finland) Nanne Dahlman	1–6, 1–6
Win	9.	18 September 1989	Porto, Portugal	Clay	(Spain) Janet Souto	(Spain) Virginia Ruano Pascual (Spain) Inmaculada Varas	3–6, 6–3, 6–4
Loss	10.	12 March 1990	Murcia, Spain	Clay	(Spain) Janet Souto	(Spain) Ana-Belen Quintana (Spain) Ana Segura	5–7, 5–7
Win	11.	25 February 1991	Valencia, Spain	Clay	(Spain) Janet Souto	(Czechoslovakia) Janette Husárová (Czechoslovakia) Zdeňka Málková	6–2, 6–3
Win	12.	18 March 1991	Alicante, Spain	Clay	(Spain) Silvia Ramón-Cortés	(Spain) Eva Bes (Spain) Virginia Ruano Pascual	6–3, 0–6, 7–5
Loss	13.	8 April 1991	Limoges, France	Carpet	(Spain) Janet Souto	(Finland) Anne Aallonen (Soviet Union) Eugenia Maniokova	3–6, 6–1, 5–7
Loss	14.	3 June 1991	Milan, Italy	Clay	(Spain) Janet Souto	(Italy) Nathalie Baudone (Italy) Francesca Romano	4–6, 5–7
Win	15.	1 July 1991	Palermo, Italy	Clay	(Spain) Janet Souto	(Italy) Claudia Piccini (Italy) Cristina Salvi	6–3, 6–2
Loss	16.	28 October 1991	Madeira, Portugal	Hard	(Spain) Janet Souto	(Netherlands) Carin Bakkum (Germany) Meike Babel	3–6, 2–6
Loss	17.	11 May 1992	Barcelona, Spain	Hard	(Spain) Gala León García	(Argentina) Paola Suárez (Argentina) Pamela Zingman	4–6, 2–6
Win	18.	13 July 1992	Vigo, Spain	Clay	(Spain) Janet Souto	(United States) Kylie Johnson (Germany) Sabine Lohmann	2–6, 6–3, 7–5

== See also ==
- List of Spain Fed Cup team representatives
