= Sabrina Lucchi =

Italian tennis player

- Country (sports): Italy
- Born: 15 August 1968 (age 58)
- Prize money: $20,355

Singles
- Career record: 66–49
- Career titles: 1 ITF
- Highest ranking: No. 210 (27 Aug 1990)

Doubles
- Career record: 5–7
- Highest ranking: No. 374 (4 Jul 1988)

Sabrina Lucchi (born 15 August 1968) is an Italian former professional tennis player.

Lucchi competed on the professional tour in the late 1980s and early 1990s. She reached her career high singles ranking of 210 in 1990, then in 1991 made her only WTA Tour main draw appearances, at the Spanish, Italian and San Marino Opens. At the Italian Open she took a set off the fifth seed Laura Garrone, in a first round loss.

== ITF finals ==
=== Singles: 3 (1–2) ===
Outcome	No.	Date	Tournament	Surface	Opponent	Score
Winner	1.	19 July 1987	Subiaco, Italy	Clay	(Italy) Laura Lapi	1–6, 6–1, 7–6
Runner-up	1.	26 July 1987	Sezze, Italy	Clay	(Spain) Inmaculada Varas	2–6, 1–6
Runner-up	2.	18 March 1990	Murcia, Spain	Clay	(China) Li Fang	2–6, 5–7
