= Ana Segura =

Spanish tennis player (born 1969)

- Full name: Ana María Segura Pérez
- Country (sports): Spain
- Born: 5 February 1969 (age 56)
- Prize money: $63,050

Singles
- Career record: 116–101
- Highest ranking: No. 185 (19 August 1991)

Doubles
- Career record: 92–72
- Highest ranking: No. 103 (10 August 1992)

Grand Slam doubles results
- French Open: 2R (1992)
- Wimbledon: 1R (1992)
- US Open: 1R (1992)

Ana María Segura Pérez (born 5 February 1969) is a former professional tennis player from Spain.

== Biography ==
Segura reached a top singles ranking of 185 in the world, with her best WTA Tour performance a round of 16 appearance at the Swedish Open in 1990.

As a doubles player, Segura was ranked as high as 103 and featured in the main draws of the French Open, Wimbledon and US Open in 1992, all partnering Janet Souto. She and Petra Langrová were runners-up in the doubles in the 1992 edition of the Internazionali Femminili di Palermo WTA Tour tournament.

== WTA Tour finals ==
=== Doubles (0–1) ===
Result	Date	Tournament	Surface	Partner	Opponents	Score
Loss	Jul 1992	Palermo, Italy	Clay	(Czechoslovakia) Petra Langrová	(United States) Halle Cioffi (Argentina) María José Gaidano	3–6, 6–4, 3–6

== ITF finals ==
=== Singles (2–4) ===
Legend
$50,000 / $60,000 tournaments
$25,000 tournaments
$10,000 / $15,000 tournaments

Result	No.	Date	Tournament	Surface	Opponent	Score
Win	1.	15 September 1986	Murcia, Spain	Clay	(Spain) Conchita Martínez	7–5, 6–1
Loss	2.	7 March 1988	Castellón, Spain	Clay	(Spain) Conchita Martínez	1–6, 2–6
Loss	3.	25 September 1989	Mali Lošinj, Yugoslavia	Clay	(Socialist Federal Republic of Yugoslavia) Gorana Matić	4–6, 2–6
Win	4.	28 May 1990	Lisbon, Portugal	Clay	(Spain) Eva Bes	6–4, 6–0
Loss	5.	15 April 1991	Caserta, Italy	Clay	(Switzerland) Emanuela Zardo	7–6, 6–7, 1–6
Loss	6.	12 July 1993	Vigo, Spain	Clay	(Spain) Neus Ávila	6–7^{(7)}, 7–6^{(3)}, 6–7^{(5)}

=== Doubles (8–7) ===
Result	No.	Date	Tournament	Surface	Partner	Opponents	Score
Win	1.	4 May 1987	Bournemouth, United Kingdom	Hard	(Spain) Rosa Bielsa	(Denmark) Lone Vandborg (Netherlands) Titia Wilmink	6–4, 7–5
Loss	2.	24 August 1987	Porto, Portugal	Clay	(Argentina) Gaby Castro	(Spain) Janet Souto (Spain) Ninoska Souto	6–4, 2–6, 0–6
Win	3.	31 August 1987	Vilamoura, Portugal	Clay	(Argentina) Gaby Castro	(Switzerland) Sandrine Jaquet (Switzerland) Andrea Martinelli	6–2, 6–1
Loss	4.	21 March 1988	Reims, France	Clay	(Argentina) Gaby Castro	(Brazil) Luciana Tella (Brazil) Andrea Vieira	3–6, 7–5, 2–6
Loss	5.	4 April 1988	Bari, Italy	Clay	(Argentina) Gaby Castro	(Czechoslovakia) Michaela Frimmelová (Czechoslovakia) Petra Langrová	4–6, 5–7
Loss	6.	15 August 1988	Caltagirone, Italy	Clay	(Argentina) Gaby Castro	(Spain) Janet Souto (Netherlands) Titia Wilmink	4–6, 2–6
Win	7.	11 September 1989	Pamplona, Spain	Hard	(Brazil) Cláudia Chabalgoity	(Spain) Eva Bes (Spain) Virginia Ruano Pascual	6–3, 6–0
Win	8.	12 March 1990	Murcia, Spain	Clay	(Spain) Ana-Belen Quintana	(Spain) Rosa Bielsa (Spain) Janet Souto	7–5, 7–5
Win	9.	28 May 1990	Lisbon, Portugal	Clay	(Spain) Ana-Belen Quintana	(Netherlands) Ingelise Driehuis (Australia) Justine Hodder	6–0, 6–2
Loss	10.	4 June 1990	Lisbon, Portugal	Clay	(Spain) Ana-Belen Quintana	(Netherlands) Ingelise Driehuis (Australia) Justine Hodder	3–6, 3–6
Win	11.	30 July 1990	Vigo, Spain	Clay	(Spain) María José Llorca	(Spain) Eva Bes (Spain) Virginia Ruano Pascual	6–3, 6–4
Winner	12.	10 June 1991	Mondorf-les-Bains, Luxembourg	Clay	(Czechoslovakia) Radka Bobková	(Czechoslovakia) Denisa Krajčovičová (Germany) Henrike Kadzidroga	6–1, 6–4
Win	13.	19 August 1991	Spoleto, Italy	Clay	(Spain) Janet Souto	(Netherlands) Ingelise Driehuis (Australia) Louise Pleming	3–6, 7–6^{(5)}, 6–4
Loss	14.	21 September 1992	Acireale, Italy	Hard	(Spain) Janet Souto	(Australia) Kirrily Sharpe (Netherlands) Claire Wegink	6–4, 1–6, 1–6
Loss	15.	1 November 1993	Vilamoura, Portugal	Hard	(Spain) Gala León García	(Poland) Magdalena Feistel (Poland) Katharzyna Teodorowicz	6–7, 2–6
