= Janet Souto =

Spanish tennis player (born 1967)

- Full name: Janet Souto-Garcia
- Country (sports): Spain
- Born: 22 November 1967 (age 57); Caracas, Venezuela
- Prize money: $59,266

Singles
- Career record: 93–98
- Highest ranking: No. 217 (19 June 1989)

Doubles
- Career record: 114–76
- Highest ranking: No. 122 (17 August 1992)

Grand Slam doubles results
- French Open: 2R (1992)
- Wimbledon: 1R (1992)
- US Open: 1R (1992, 1994)

Janet Souto-Garcia (born 22 November 1967) is a former professional tennis player from Spain.

== Biography ==
Souto, who comes from Galicia but is Venezuelan by birth, began playing on the professional tour in the late 1980s.

Often partnering her sister Ninoska, the pair made the doubles semi-finals of the 1988 Spanish Open.

In 1992 she featured in the main draw of the women's doubles at three grand slam tournaments, all with Ana Segura as her partner. She also featured in the 1994 US Open, partnering Ruxandra Dragomir.

== ITF finals ==
=== Singles (1–0) ===
Legend
$50,000 / $60,000 tournaments
$25,000 tournaments
$10,000 / $15,000 tournaments

Result	No.	Date	Tournament	Surface	Opponent	Score
Win	1.	21 September 1987	Llorca, Spain	Clay	(Sweden) Maria Strandlund	1–6, 6–4, 6–4

=== Doubles (11–10) ===
Result	No.	Date	Tournament	Surface	Partner	Opponents	Score
Win	1.	28 July 1986	Sezze, Italy	Clay	(Spain) Ninoska Souto	(Spain) Rosa Bielsa (Spain) Elena Guerra	6–3, 7–6
Win	2.	24 August 1987	Porto, Portugal	Clay	(Spain) Ninoska Souto	(Argentina) Gaby Castro (Spain) Ana Segura	4–6, 6–2, 6–0
Win	3.	7 March 1988	Castellón, Spain	Clay	(Spain) Ninoska Souto	(Mexico) Lucila Becerra (Mexico) Claudia Hernández	4–6, 6–2, 6–2
Win	4.	8 August 1988	Palermo, Italy	Clay	(Spain) Rosa Bielsa	(United States) Allison Cooper (United States) Mary Norwood	6–3, 2–6, 7–5
Win	5.	15 August 1988	Caltagirone, Italy	Clay	(Netherlands) Titia Wilmink	(Argentina) Gaby Castro (Spain) Ana Segura	6–4, 6–2
Loss	6.	29 August 1988	Corsica, France	Clay	(Spain) Rosa Bielsa	(Austria) Bettina Diesner (Switzerland) Mareke Plocher	1–6, 4–6
Loss	7.	12 September 1988	Arzachena, Italy	Hard	(Spain) Rosa Bielsa	(United States) Anne Grousbeck (Australia) Tracey Morton	5–7, 1–6
Loss	8.	28 August 1989	Arzachena, Italy	Hard	(Spain) Rosa Bielsa	(Finland) Anne Aallonen (Finland) Nanne Dahlman	1–6, 1–6
Win	9.	18 September 1989	Porto, Portugal	Clay	(Spain) Rosa Bielsa	(Spain) Virginia Ruano Pascual (Spain) Inmaculada Varas	3–6, 6–3, 6–4
Loss	10.	12 March 1990	Murcia, Spain	Clay	(Spain) Rosa Bielsa	(Spain) Ana-Belen Quintana (Spain) Ana Segura	5–7, 5–7
Win	11.	25 February 1991	Valencia, Spain	Clay	(Spain) Rosa Bielsa	(Czechoslovakia) Janette Husárová (Czechoslovakia) Zdeňka Málková	6–2, 6–3
Loss	12.	8 April 1991	Limoges, France	Carpet	(Spain) Rosa Bielsa	(Finland) Anne Aallonen (Russia) Eugenia Maniokova	3–6, 6–1, 5–7
Loss	13.	3 June 1991	Milan, Italy	Clay	(Spain) Rosa Bielsa	(Italy) Nathalie Baudone (Italy) Francesca Romano	4–6, 5–7
Win	14.	1 July 1991	Palermo, Italy	Clay	(Spain) Rosa Bielsa	(Italy) Claudia Piccini (Italy) Cristina Salvi	6–3, 6–2
Win	15.	19 August 1991	Spoleto, Italy	Clay	(Spain) Ana Segura	(Netherlands) Ingelise Driehuis (Australia) Louise Pleming	3–6, 7–6^{(5)}, 6–4
Loss	16.	28 October 1991	Madeira, Portugal	Hard	(Spain) Rosa Bielsa	(Netherlands) Carin Bakkum (Germany) Meike Babel	3–6, 2–6
Win	17.	13 July 1992	Vigo, Spain	Clay	(Spain) Rosa Bielsa	(United States) Kylie Johnson (Germany) Sabine Lohmann	2–6, 6–3, 7–5
Loss	18.	21 September 1992	Acireale, Italy	Hard	(Spain) Ana Segura	(Australia) Kirrily Sharpe (Netherlands) Claire Wegink	6–4, 1–6, 1–6
Loss	19.	21 February 1994	Valencia, Spain	Clay	(Spain) Gala León García	(Netherlands) Seda Noorlander (Netherlands) Hanneke Ketelaars	4–6, 4–6
Loss	20.	6 June 1994	Elvas, Portugal	Hard	(Austria) Désirée Leupold	(Belgium) Ann Devries (Portugal) Sofia Prazeres	2–6, 6–4, 5–7
Win	21.	27 June 1994	Cáceres, Spain	Hard	(Spain) Gala León García	(Spain) Mariam Ramón Climent (Spain) María Sánchez Lorenzo	4–6, 6–2, 6–1
