= Titia Wilmink =

Dutch tennis player

- Country (sports): Netherlands
- Born: 1 October 1968 (age 56)
- Turned pro: 1986
- Retired: 1991
- Prize money: US$ 29,546

Singles
- Career record: 64–72
- Career titles: 0
- Highest ranking: No. 218 (27 March 1989)

Grand Slam singles results
- French Open: Q1 (1989, 1990)

Doubles
- Career record: 79–63
- Career titles: 6 ITF
- Highest ranking: No. 159 (25 September 1989)

Titia Wilmink (born 1 October 1968) is a former professional Dutch tennis player.

Wilmink made her WTA Tour main-draw debut at the 1989 Citizen Cup, in the doubles event, partnering Julie Salmon.

== ITF Circuit finals ==
=== Singles (0–3) ===
Legend
$100,000 tournaments
$75,000 tournaments
$50,000 tournaments
$25,000 tournaments
$10,000 tournaments

Outcome	No.	Date	Tournament	Surface	Opponent	Score
Runner-up	1.	September 19, 1988	Marsa, Malta	Hard	(Hungary) Réka Szikszay	2–6, 6–2, 1–6
Runner-up	2.	November 28, 1988	Okpe, Nigeria	Hard	(Sweden) Maria Ekstrand	5–7, 6–7
Runner-up	3.	December 5, 1988	Benin City, Nigeria	Hard	(Sweden) Maria Ekstrand	1–6, 4–6

=== Doubles (6–6) ===
Outcome	No.	Date	Tournament	Surface	Partner	Opponents	Score
Runner-up	1.	March 30, 1987	Arad, Israel	Hard	(Netherlands) Hester Witvoet	(Israel) Ilana Berger (Israel) Yael Shavit	3–6, 2–6
Winner	2.	April 7, 1987	Haifa, Israel	Hard	(Netherlands) Hester Witvoet	(West Germany) Christine Hein (West Germany) Evelyn Larwig	6–1, 7–6
Runner-up	3.	April 27, 1987	Sutton, United Kingdom	Hard	(Denmark) Lone Vandborg	(South Africa) Linda Barnard (United Kingdom) Belinda Borneo	6–2, 5–7, 6–7
Runner-up	4.	May 4, 1987	Bournemouth, United Kingdom	Hard	(Denmark) Lone Vandborg	(Spain) Rosa Bielsa (Spain) Ana Segura	4–6, 5–7
Runner-up	5.	May 11, 1987	Lee-on-Solent, United Kingdom	Clay	(Israel) Ilana Berger	(United Kingdom) Valda Lake (Argentina) Andrea Tiezzi	3–6, 2–6
Winner	6.	February 1, 1988	Tapiola, Finland	Hard	(Sweden) Anna-Karin Olsson	(United States) Jackie Joseph (Netherlands) Ingrid Peltzer	6–3, 6–2
Runner-up	7.	June 26, 1988	Arezzo, Italy	Clay	(Indonesia) Yayuk Basuki	(Soviet Union) Eugenia Maniokova (Soviet Union) Viktoria Milvidskaia	6–0, 5–7, 1–6
Winner	8.	August 15, 1988	Caltagirone, Italy	Clay	(Spain) Janet Souto	(Argentina) Gaby Castro (Spain) Ana Segura	6–4, 6–2
Winner	9.	September 19, 1988	Marsa, Malta	Hard	(Switzerland) Mareke Plocher	(Hungary) Réka Szikszay (Netherlands) Amy van Buuren	7–5, 7–6
Winner	10.	November 28, 1988	Okpe, Nigeria	Hard	(Belgium) Corine Bousmans	(Sweden) Maria Ekstrand (Netherlands) Jana Koran	7–6^{(0)}, 6–1
Winner	11.	December 5, 1988	Benin City, Nigeria	Hard	(Sweden) Maria Ekstrand	(Belgium) Corine Bousmans (United States) Hemel Meghani	6–2, 6–3
Runner-up	12.	July 3, 1989	Cava de' Tirreni, Italy	Clay	(United States) Anne Grousbeck	(Australia) Kate McDonald (Australia) Rennae Stubbs	6–2, 1–6, 1–6
