= Ninoska Souto =

Spanish tennis player (born 1968)

- Full name: Ninoska Souto-Garcia
- Country (sports): Spain
- Born: 3 December 1968 (age 56)
- Prize money: $18,856

Singles
- Career record: 54–59
- Highest ranking: No. 254 (10 November 1986)

Doubles
- Career record: 59–43
- Highest ranking: No. 154 (6 June 1988)

Ninoska Souto-Garcia (born 3 December 1968) is a Spanish former professional tennis player.

Souto comes from the Galicia region of Spain and is of Venezuelan descent. Her sister, Janet Souto, also played on the professional tour.

As a professional player, Souto reached a best singles ranking of 254 and was ranked as high as 154 in doubles. Her main draw appearances on the WTA Tour all came in doubles, which includes making the semi-finals of the 1988 Spanish Open, partnering sister Janet.

Souto married Spanish footballer Xavier Escaich in 1992.

== ITF finals ==
$25,000 tournaments
$10,000 tournaments

=== Singles: 1 (1–0) ===
Result	No.	Date	Tournament	Surface	Opponent	Score
Win	1.	26 March 1990	Madrid, Spain	Clay	(Spain) Eva Bes	6–3, 6–0

=== Doubles: 9 (6–3) ===
Result	No.	Date	Tournament	Surface	Partner	Opponents	Score
Win	1.	5 November 1984	Barcelona, Spain	Clay	(Spain) Janet Souto	(Spain) Ana Almansa (Spain) Michelle Garth	6–2, 6–4
Loss	1.	16 September 1985	Majorca, Spain	Clay	(Spain) Inmaculada Varas	(Netherlands) Carin Bakkum (Netherlands) Nicole Muns-Jagerman	4–6, 0–6
Win	2.	28 July 1986	Sezze, Italy	Clay	(Spain) Janet Souto	(Spain) Rosa Bielsa (Spain) Elena Guerra	6–3, 7–6
Win	3.	8 September 1986	Lisbon, Portugal	Clay	(Spain) María José Llorca	(Mexico) Claudia Hernández (Hong Kong) Patricia Hy	6–1, 4–6, 6–4
Win	4.	24 August 1987	Porto, Portugal	Clay	(Spain) Janet Souto	(Argentina) Gaby Castro (Spain) Ana Segura	4–6, 6–2, 6–0
Win	5.	7 March 1988	Castellón, Spain	Clay	(Spain) Janet Souto	(Mexico) Lucila Becerra (Mexico) Claudia Hernández	4–6, 6–2, 6–2
Loss	2.	18 July 1989	Francavilla, Italy	Clay	(Netherlands) Mara Eijkenboom	(Poland) Sylwia Czopek (Poland) Magdalena Feistel	3–6, 2–6
Loss	3.	31 July 1989	Vigo, Spain	Clay	(Spain) Ana Larrakoetxea	(Brazil) Luciana Corsato-Owsianka (France) Pascale Etchemendy	3–6, 1–6
Win	6.	19 March 1990	Granada, Spain	Hard	(Spain) Elena Ordiñaga	(Spain) Inés Canadell (Spain) Bárbara Navarro	7–5, 4–6, 6–2
