= Louise Pleming =

Australian tennis player

- Country (sports): Australia
- Born: 22 June 1967 (age 59)
- Turned pro: 1987
- Retired: 2001
- Plays: Right-handed
- Prize money: $182,195

Singles
- Career record: 56–116
- Career titles: 0
- Highest ranking: No. 290 (1996)

Grand Slam singles results
- Australian Open: Q2 (1991)

Doubles
- Career record: 161–174
- Career titles: 10 ITF
- Highest ranking: No. 87 (1998)

Grand Slam doubles results
- Australian Open: 2R (1993, 1994, 1995)
- French Open: 3R (1996)
- Wimbledon: 2R (1999)
- US Open: 2R (1997, 1998)

Louise Pleming (born 22 June 1967) is an Australian former professional tennis player who participated in both the ITF Circuit and the WTA Tour.

== Background ==
Pleming was born in Wagga Wagga, NSW, Australia. She began to play tennis for fun when she was six years old. She attended the Vic Edwards Tennis School. In 1982 she began playing professionally.

== Championships ==
Pleming played in 11 championships between 1991 and 2001. Out of a total 17 matches played, she won four (three in doubles, one in singles). She won 177 games, lost 239 games; won four tie-breaks and lost three tie-breaks. Her highest singles ranking was 290 in 1996 and her highest doubles ranking was 87 in 1998.

== Achievements ==
In 2006 Tennis Australia appointed her a national touring coach. A year later she was the captain of the Australian Junior Fed Cup team that won. In 1999, she played the World Team Tennis with Martina Navratilova for the New York Buzz team. Between 1998–2002 she was an expert commentator for the Hopman Cup on ABC and Foxport.

== Retirement ==
Even after Pleming retired from playing tennis professionally, she remained active in the industry. She is a tennis television commentator for Australian Channel 7 and an AIS Pro Tour Program Women's Program Coach. She works alongside Victorian Sally Peers and Queenslander Monika Wejnert. She is a commentator on the TV Series ‘Wimbledon’ which is the BBC's live coverage of the Wimbledon Tennis Championships at the All England Club. She coaches privately in the inner Eastern suburbs area.

As a coach, Pleming is known "to be vocal during matches and she likes to repeatedly offer encouragement to all her players."

In November 2020 she was instrumental in the setting up of RALLY4EVER, a charity which aims to create bridges between the tennis world and disadvantaged and homeless Australians, especially those with mental health problems.

== WTA career finals ==
=== Doubles: 1 (runner-up) ===
Legend
Grand Slam (0–0)
Tier I (0–0)
Tier II (0–0)
Tier III, IV & V (0–1)

Result	Date	Tournament	Surface	Partner	Opponents	Score
Loss	May 1999	Belgian Open	Clay	(United States) Meghann Shaughnessy	(Italy) Laura Golarsa (Slovenia) Katarina Srebotnik	4–6, 2–6

== ITF finals ==
$75,000 tournaments
$50,000 tournaments
$25,000 tournaments
$10,000 tournaments

=== Doubles: 25 (10–15) ===
Result	No.	Date	Tournament	Surface	Partner	Opponents	Score
Win	1.	10 August 1986	Kitzbühel, Austria	Clay	(Australia) Justine Brown	(Austria) Heidi Sprung (Austria) Judith Wiesner	6–0, 6–0
Loss	1.	11 June 1990	Cascais, Portugal	Clay	(Netherlands) Ingelise Driehuis	(Belgium) Els Callens (Belgium) Caroline Wuillot	6–2, 4–6, 6–7^{(6–8)}
Win	2.	2 July 1990	Cherbourg, France	Clay	(West Germany) Cora Linneman	(France) Alexandra Fusai (France) Olivia Féry	6–4, 6–3
Win	3.	16 July 1990	Schwarzach, Austria	Clay	(Netherlands) Ingelise Driehuis	(West Germany) Cora Linneman (New Zealand) Ruth Seeman	6–2, 6–0
Win	4.	27 August 1990	Palermo, Italy	Clay	(Netherlands) Ingelise Driehuis	(France) Emmanuelle Derly (Austria) Sandra Reichel	6–1, 6–1
Loss	2.	3 September 1990	Arzachena, Italy	Hard	(France) Emmanuelle Derly	(United Kingdom) Belinda Borneo (United Kingdom) Julie Salmon	1–6, 6–4, 3–6
Loss	3.	18 November 1990	Nuriootpa, Australia	Hard	(Netherlands) Ingelise Driehuis	(Indonesia) Yayuk Basuki (Indonesia) Suzanna Wibowo	6–7, 1–6
Loss	4.	1 April 1991	Moulins, France	Hard	(Netherlands) Ingelise Driehuis	(France) Catherine Suire (France) Sandrine Testud	3–6, 4–6
Win	5.	22 July 1991	Sezze, Italy	Clay	(Australia) Danielle Jones	(Netherlands) Ingelise Driehuis (Australia) Justine Hodder	6–3, 6–2
Loss	5.	19 August 1991	Spoleto, Italy	Clay	(Netherlands) Ingelise Driehuis	(Spain) Ana Segura (Spain) Janet Souto	6–3, 6–7, 4–6
Loss	6.	2 September 1991	Arzachena, Italy	Hard	(Israel) Ilana Berger	(Finland) Nanne Dahlman (Czechoslovakia) Jana Pospíšilová	6–3, 3–6, 1–6
Loss	7.	11 November 1991	Mount Gambier, Australia	Hard	(Netherlands) Ingelise Driehuis	(Australia) Kristin Godridge (Australia) Nicole Pratt	7–6, 3–6, 4–6
Loss	8.	25 November 1991	Mildura, Australia	Hard	(Netherlands) Ingelise Driehuis	(Australia) Catherine Barclay (Australia) Louise Stacey	4–6, 3–6
Win	6.	31 October 1994	Saga, Japan	Grass	(Japan) Ei Iida	(Japan) Mami Donoshiro (Japan) Yuka Tanaka	6–3, 7–6^{(7–2)}
Loss	9.	21 November 1994	Mount Gambier, Australia	Hard	(Croatia) Maja Murić	(Australia) Catherine Barclay (United States) Shannan McCarthy	3–6, 4–6
Loss	10.	12 December 1994	Mildura, France	Grass	(Australia) Catherine Barclay	(France) Catherine Tanvier (Canada) Vanessa Webb	6–7, 6–4, 3–6
Win	7.	24 July 1995	Valladolid, Spain	Clay	(Greece) Christína Papadáki	(Italy) Gloria Pizzichini (Italy) Sara Ventura	1–6, 6–2, 7–5
Loss	11.	11 December 1995	Nuriootpa, Australia	Hard	(Croatia) Maja Murić	(Australia) Annabel Ellwood (Australia) Kirrily Sharpe	4–6, 7–5, 4–6
Loss	12.	20 April 1997	Wichita, United States	Hard	(Australia) Nicole Pratt	(United States) Shannan McCarthy (United States) Kelly Wilson	6–4, 5–7, 2–6
Win	8.	21 April 1997	Monterrey, Mexico	Hard	(United States) Erika deLone	(United States) Stephanie Mabry (United States) Brie Rippner	7–6^{(7–3)}, 3–6, 7–6^{(7–3)}
Loss	13.	19 April 1998	La Canada, United States	Hard	(United States) Katie Schlukebir	(United States) Debbie Graham (United States) Jean Okada	6–2, 5–7, 3–6
Loss	14.	25 October 1998	Welwyn, United Kingdom	Carpet (i)	(United Kingdom) Samantha Smith	(Belgium) Laurence Courtois (Slovenia) Tina Križan	6–7, 4–6
Win	9.	15 March 1999	Ashkelon, Israel	Hard	(Australia) Rachel McQuillan	(Belarus) Nadejda Ostrovskaya (Belarus) Tatiana Poutchek	6–3, 6–2
Loss	15.	12 April 1996	Open de Cagnes-sur-Mer, France	Hard	(France) Catherine Tanvier	(United Kingdom) Karen Cross (Australia) Amanda Grahame	4–6, 6–3, 6–7
Win	10.	28 November 1999	Nuriootpa, Australia	Hard	(Kazakhstan) Irina Selyutina	(Australia) Rachel McQuillan (Australia) Trudi Musgrave	6–4, 6–4
