= Pascale Etchemendy =

French tennis player

- Country (sports): France
- Born: 6 June 1966 (age 58)
- Retired: 1995
- Prize money: $98,468

Singles
- Career record: 103-109
- Career titles: 1 ITF
- Highest ranking: No. 132 (11 June 1990)

Grand Slam singles results
- Australian Open: 1R (1990)
- French Open: 2R (1986, 1989, 1990)
- Wimbledon: 2R (1990)

Doubles
- Career record: 28-43
- Career titles: 1 ITF
- Highest ranking: No. 211 (11 April 1988)

Grand Slam doubles results
- Wimbledon: Q2 (1986)

Pascale Etchemendy (born 6 June 1966) is a French former professional tennis player.

Etchemendy featured in the main draw of six French Open tournaments, making the second round on three occasions. At the 1986 French Open she lost a second round match to 13th seed Carling Bassett, having led 5–3 in the third set. In 1990 she also played in the main draws of the Australian Open and Wimbledon. She had a career high singles ranking of 132 in the world and her best WTA Tour performance was a semi-final appearance at the Taranto in 1990.

== ITF finals ==
=== Singles (1–1) ===
Legend
$25,000 tournaments
$10,000 tournaments

Result	No.	Date	Tournament	Surface	Opponent	Score
Win	1.	27 April 1986	Hatfield, United Kingdom	Clay	(Sweden) Helena Olsson	6–3, 7–5
Loss	2.	27 March 1989	Bayonne, France	Hard	(France) Catherine Tanvier	2–6, 4–6

=== Doubles (1–2) ===
Result	No.	Date	Tournament	Surface	Partner	Opponents	Score
Loss	1.	9 November 1987	Eastbourne, United Kingdom	Carpet	(United Kingdom) Joy Tacon	(Soviet Union) Eugenia Maniokova (Soviet Union) Natalia Medvedeva	1–6, 1–6
Win	2.	31 July 1989	Vigo, Spain	Clay	(Brazil) Luciana Corsato-Owsianka	(Spain) Ana Larrakoetxea (Spain) Ninoska Souto	6–3, 6–1
Loss	3.	9 October 1995	Saint-Raphaël, France	Clay	(France) Angelique Olivier	(France) Amélie Mauresmo (France) Berangere Quillot	3–6, 6–7
