= Nicole Jagerman =

Dutch tennis player (born 1967)

- Country (sports): Netherlands
- Born: 23 July 1967 (age 57); Amstelveen, Netherlands
- Prize money: $494,184

Singles
- Career record: 136–138
- Career titles: 0
- Highest ranking: No. 43 (14 May 1990)

Grand Slam singles results
- Australian Open: 3R (1988, 1990)
- French Open: 4R (1988)
- Wimbledon: 2R (1990, 1991)
- US Open: 3R (1993)

Doubles
- Career record: 115–112
- Career titles: 2 WTA, 4 ITF
- Highest ranking: No. 22 (10 October 1994)

Grand Slam doubles results
- Australian Open: QF (1995)
- French Open: 3R (1995)
- Wimbledon: 3R (1993, 1994, 1995)
- US Open: 3R (1994)

Grand Slam mixed doubles results
- Australian Open: 1R (1994)
- French Open: 1R (1989, 1995)
- Wimbledon: 3R (1987)
- US Open: 2R (1995)

Nicole Jagerman (born 23 July 1967) is a Dutch former professional tennis player.

Jagerman represented her native country at the 1992 Barcelona Olympics. As a pro, she reached her career-high singles on 14 May 1990 when she became world No. 43.

When she married Karel Muns she competed as Nicole Muns or Nicole Muns-Jagerman; later she married Ronald Krijger and competed as Nicole Krijger or Nicole Krijger-Jagerman.

== WTA career finals ==
=== Doubles: 5 (2 titles, 3 runner-ups) ===
Result	W-L	Date	Tournament	Surface	Partner	Opponents	Score
Win	1–0	Jul 1986	Perugia, Italy	Clay	(Netherlands) Carin Bakkum	(Switzerland) Csilla Bartos-Cserepy (United States) Amy Holton	6–4, 6–4
Loss	1–1	Dec 1986	Buenos Aires, Argentina	Clay	(Netherlands) Manon Bollegraf	(United States) Lori McNeil (Argentina) Mercedes Paz	1–6, 6–2, 1–6
Loss	1–2	Jul 1990	Båstad, Sweden	Clay	(Netherlands) Carin Bakkum	(Argentina) Mercedes Paz (Denmark) Tine Scheuer-Larsen	3–6, 7–6^{(12–10)}, 2–6
Loss	1–3	Jul 1990	Estoril, Portugal	Clay	(Netherlands) Carin Bakkum	(Italy) Sandra Cecchini (Argentina) Patricia Tarabini	6–1, 2–6, 3–6
Win	2–3	Jul 1991	Kitzbühel, Austria	Clay	(Argentina) Bettina Fulco	(Italy) Sandra Cecchini (Argentina) Patricia Tarabini	7–5, 6–4

== ITF finals ==
$100,000 tournaments
$75,000 tournaments
$50,000 tournaments
$25,000 tournaments
$10,000 tournaments

=== Singles (0–3) ===
Result	No.	Date	Tournament	Surface	Opponent	Score
Loss	1.	9 September 1985	Valencia, Spain	Clay	(Netherlands) Carin Bakkum	3–6, 3–6
Loss	2.	11 November 1985	London, UK	Hard	(Sweden) Cecilia Dahlman	6–2, 4–6, 1–6
Loss	3.	25 November 1985	Telford, UK	Hard	(West Germany) Claudia Porwik	3–6, 4–6

=== Doubles (4–2) ===
Result	No.	Date	Tournament	Surface	Partner	Opponents	Score
Win	1.	16 September 1985	Mallorca, Spain	Clay	(Netherlands) Carin Bakkum	(Spain) Ninoska Souto (Spain) Inmaculada Varas	6–4, 6–0
Loss	2.	25 November 1985	Telford, UK	Hard	(United Kingdom) Belinda Borneo	(United States) Cathy Maso (United States) Susan Pendo	6–4, 3–6, 2–6
Win	3.	12 May 1986	Lee-on-the-Solent, UK	Clay	(Netherlands) Carin Bakkum	(France) Emmanuelle Derly (Netherlands) Hellas Ter Riet	7–6, 3–6, 6–1
Win	4.	9 June 1986	Lyon, France	Clay	(Netherlands) Simone Schilder	(Czechoslovakia) Denisa Krajčovičová (Hungary) Réka Szikszay	7–5, 6–4
Win	5.	14 July 1986	Landskrona, Sweden	Clay	(Netherlands) Carin Bakkum	(Netherlands) Manon Bollegraf (Netherlands) Marianne van der Torre	4–6, 6–2, 6–2
Loss	6.	10 November 1986	São Paulo, Brazil	Hard	(Netherlands) Manon Bollegraf	(Brazil) Niege Dias (Brazil) Patricia Medrado	w/o
