= 1991 French Open – Women's doubles =

Women's doubles
- 1991 French Open

Final
- Champion: (United States) Gigi Fernández (Czechoslovakia) Jana Novotná
- Runner-up: (Soviet Union) Larisa Neiland (Soviet Union) Natasha Zvereva
- Score: 6–4, 6–0

Details
- Draw: 64 (4 WC )
- Seeds: 16

Events
Singles	men	women		boys	girls
Doubles	men	women	mixed	boys	girls
WC Singles	men	women	quad
WC Doubles	men	women	quad
Legends	−45	45+	women
← 1990 ·	French Open	· 1992 →

Jana Novotná and Helena Suková were the defending champions, but they participated in this tournament with different partners. Suková played alongside Arantxa Sánchez Vicario, but lost in the semifinals to Novotná and Gigi Fernández. Fernández and Novotná then won the title, defeating Larisa Neiland and Natasha Zvereva in the final 6–4, 6–0.

== Seeds ==
1. (United States) Gigi Fernández / (Czechoslovakia) Jana Novotná (champions)
2. (Soviet Union) Larisa Neiland / (Soviet Union) Natasha Zvereva (final)
3. (Spain) Arantxa Sánchez Vicario / (Czechoslovakia) Helena Suková (semifinals)
4. (United States) Mary Joe Fernández / (United States) Zina Garrison-Jackson (quarterfinals)
5. (United States) Kathy Jordan / (United States) Meredith McGrath (quarterfinals)
6. (Australia) Nicole Provis / (Australia) Elizabeth Smylie (second round)
7. (United States) Elise Burgin / (United States) Patty Fendick (quarterfinals)
8. (Argentina) Mercedes Paz / (Argentina) Gabriela Sabatini (semifinals)
9. (United States) Katrina Adams / (Netherlands) Manon Bollegraf (third round)
10. (Canada) Helen Kelesi / (United States) Kathy Rinaldi (first round)
11. (South Africa) Rosalyn Fairbank-Nideffer / (South Africa) Elna Reinach (second round)
12. (France) Nathalie Tauziat / (Austria) Judith Wiesner (third round)
13. (Germany) Claudia Kohde-Kilsch / (Soviet Union) Leila Meskhi (third round)
14. (Australia) Rachel McQuillan / (France) Catherine Tanvier (third round)
15. (Netherlands) Brenda Schultz / (Netherlands) Caroline Vis (first round)
16. (Belgium) Sabine Appelmans / (Italy) Sandra Cecchini (first round)

== Draw ==
=== Key ===
- Q = Qualifier
- WC = Wild card
- LL = Lucky loser
- Alt = Alternate
- SE = Special exempt
- PR = Protected ranking
- ITF = ITF entry
- JE = Junior exempt
- w/o = Walkover
- r = Retired
- d = Defaulted
- SR = Special ranking

=== Finals ===
Quarterfinals
1	(United States) Gigi Fernández (Czechoslovakia) Jana Novotná	6	6
7	(United States) Elise Burgin (United States) Patty Fendick	3	4
3	(Spain) Arantxa Sánchez Vicario (Czechoslovakia) Helena Suková	6	6
(United States) Sandy Collins (France) Mary Pierce	3	2
8	(Argentina) Mercedes Paz (Argentina) Gabriela Sabatini	6	6
4	(United States) Mary Joe Fernández (United States) Zina Garrison-Jackson	1	2
5	(United States) Kathy Jordan (United States) Meredith McGrath	3	7	0
2	(Soviet Union) Larisa Neiland (Soviet Union) Natasha Zvereva	6	5	6

Semifinals
1	(United States) Gigi Fernández (Czechoslovakia) Jana Novotná	7	5	6
3	(Spain) Arantxa Sánchez Vicario (Czechoslovakia) Helena Suková	5	7	4
8	(Argentina) Mercedes Paz (Argentina) Gabriela Sabatini	3	7	7
2	(Soviet Union) Larisa Neiland (Soviet Union) Natasha Zvereva	6	5	9

Final
1	(United States) Gigi Fernández (Czechoslovakia) Jana Novotná	6	6
2	(Soviet Union) Larisa Neiland (Soviet Union) Natasha Zvereva	4	0

=== Top half ===
==== Section 1 ====
First round
1	(United States) G Fernández (Czechoslovakia) J Novotná	6	6
(Netherlands) C Bakkum (Netherlands) N Jagerman	3	3
(Netherlands) I Driehuis (Japan) M Kidowaki	6	4	2
(Netherlands) G Coorengel (Netherlands) A van Buuren	4	6	6
(Czechoslovakia) J Pospíšilová (Australia) A Scott	1	3
(United States) L Harvey-Wild (United States) S Stafford	6	6
WC	(France) J Halard (Germany) A Huber	6	6
10	(Canada) H Kelesi (United States) K Rinaldi	1	1
13	(Germany) C Kohde-Kilsch (Soviet Union) L Meskhi	6	6
WC	(France) S Amiach (France) K Quentrec	0	3
(Czechoslovakia) P Langrová (Czechoslovakia) R Zrubáková	6	6
(France) C Suire (France) S Testud	3	1
(United States) C Cunningham (Hungary) A Temesvári	6	3	4
(Mexico) L Novelo (United States) B Somerville	1	6	6
(Australia) J-A Faull (Australia) M Jaggard	4	4
7	(United States) E Burgin (United States) P Fendick	6	6

Second round
1	(United States) G Fernández (Czechoslovakia) J Novotná	6	6
(Netherlands) G Coorengel (Netherlands) A van Buuren	2	2
(United States) L Harvey-Wild (United States) S Stafford	1	2
(France) J Halard (Germany) A Huber	6	6
13	(Germany) C Kohde-Kilsch (Soviet Union) L Meskhi	6	6
(Czechoslovakia) P Langrová (Czechoslovakia) R Zrubáková	2	3
(Mexico) L Novelo (United States) B Somerville	2	6	4
7	(United States) E Burgin (United States) P Fendick	6	3	6

Third round
1	(United States) G Fernández (Czechoslovakia) J Novotná	6	7
(France) J Halard (Germany) A Huber	4	6
13	(Germany) C Kohde-Kilsch (Soviet Union) L Meskhi	4	3
7	(United States) E Burgin (United States) P Fendick	6	6

Quarterfinals
1	(United States) G Fernández (Czechoslovakia) J Novotná	6	6
7	(United States) E Burgin (United States) P Fendick	3	4

==== Section 2 ====
First round
3	(Spain) A Sánchez Vicario (Czechoslovakia) H Suková	6	6
(United States) R Baranski (Argentina) B Fulco	1	2
WC	(France) N Housset (France) S Niox-Château	6	7^{7}
(Czechoslovakia) L Lásková (Czechoslovakia) A Noháčová	3	6^{5}
(Brazil) C Chabalgoity (United Kingdom) S Smith	2	4
(Bulgaria) E Pampoulova (Czechoslovakia) E Švíglerová	6	6
(United States) G Helgeson (Germany) W Probst	3	6	6
15	(Netherlands) B Schultz (Netherlands) C Vis	6	3	4
11	(South Africa) R Fairbank-Nideffer (South Africa) E Reinach	6	6
(Australia) L Field (Sweden) M Strandlund	2	2
(Germany) E Pfaff (Australia) R Stubbs	6	1	4
(United States) S Collins (France) M Pierce	4	6	6
(South Africa) L Gregory (United States) P Mager	6^{3}	3
(Australia) T Morton (United Kingdom) C Wood	7^{7}	6
(Czechoslovakia) R Rajchrtová (Czechoslovakia) A Strnadová	7	3	4
6	(Australia) N Provis (Australia) E Smylie	5	6	6

Second round
3	(Spain) A Sánchez Vicario (Czechoslovakia) H Suková	6	6
(France) N Housset (France) S Niox-Château	0	0
(Bulgaria) E Pampoulova (Czechoslovakia) E Švíglerová	3	2
(United States) G Helgeson (Germany) W Probst	6	6
11	(South Africa) R Fairbank-Nideffer (South Africa) E Reinach	3	2
(United States) S Collins (France) M Pierce	6	6
(Australia) T Morton (United Kingdom) C Wood	6	7
6	(Australia) N Provis (Australia) E Smylie	3	5

Third round
3	(Spain) A Sánchez Vicario (Czechoslovakia) H Suková	6	6
(United States) G Helgeson (Germany) W Probst	2	3
(United States) S Collins (France) M Pierce	6	6
(Australia) T Morton (United Kingdom) C Wood	2	4

Quarterfinals
3	(Spain) A Sánchez Vicario (Czechoslovakia) H Suková	6	6
(United States) S Collins (France) M Pierce	3	2

=== Bottom half ===
==== Section 3 ====
First round
8	(Argentina) M Paz (Argentina) G Sabatini	6	6
(United States) T Whitlinger (United States) T Whittington	0	1
(France) A Dechaume (Argentina) F Labat	6	6
(Czechoslovakia) I Budařová (Germany) S Meier	1	1
(Indonesia) Y Basuki (United States) J Fuchs	6	3	6
(United States) A Grossman (Japan) N Kijimuta	0	6	2
(Bulgaria) K Maleeva (Bulgaria) M Maleeva	2	4
9	(United States) K Adams (Netherlands) M Bollegraf	6	6
14	(Australia) R McQuillan (France) C Tanvier	6	7
WC	(France) A Fusai (France) O Gravereaux	2	5
(Italy) L Ferrando (Italy) L Golarsa	6	6
(United States) C Benjamin (South Africa) A Coetzer	2	2
(Soviet Union) A Blumberga (Germany) C Schneider	6	0	6
(Peru) L Gildemeister (Denmark) T Scheuer-Larsen	3	6	3
(Canada) R Alter (Netherlands) H ter Riet	4	1
4	(United States) MJ Fernández (United States) Z Garrison-Jackson	6	6

Second round
8	(Argentina) M Paz (Argentina) G Sabatini	6	6
(France) A Dechaume (Argentina) F Labat	2	3
(Indonesia) Y Basuki (United States) J Fuchs	2	4
9	(United States) K Adams (Netherlands) M Bollegraf	6	6
14	(Australia) R McQuillan (France) C Tanvier	6	7
(Italy) L Ferrando (Italy) L Golarsa	1	5
(Soviet Union) A Blumberga (Germany) C Schneider	1	2
4	(United States) MJ Fernández (United States) Z Garrison-Jackson	6	6

Third round
8	(Argentina) M Paz (Argentina) G Sabatini	6	6
9	(United States) K Adams (Netherlands) M Bollegraf	2	2
14	(Australia) R McQuillan (France) C Tanvier	2	^{r}
4	(United States) MJ Fernández (United States) Z Garrison-Jackson	6

Quarterfinals
8	(Argentina) M Paz (Argentina) G Sabatini	6	6
4	(United States) MJ Fernández (United States) Z Garrison-Jackson	1	2

==== Section 4 ====
First round
5	(United States) K Jordan (United States) M McGrath	4	6	6
(United States) L McNeil (United States) S Rehe	6	4	3
(Switzerland) M Maleeva-Fragniere (Switzerland) M Strebel	2	6	6
(Switzerland) C Caverzasio (France) N Herreman	6	2	4
(Italy) L Garrone (Germany) K Kschwendt	6	6
(United States) B Nagelsen (United States) J Smoller	4	4
(Soviet Union) V Milvidskaia (France) S Sabas	5	6^{1}
12	(France) N Tauziat (Austria) J Wiesner	7	7^{7}
16	(Belgium) S Appelmans (Italy) S Cecchini	3	6	2
(Soviet Union) E Brioukhovets (Soviet Union) E Maniokova	6	2	6
(Belgium) A Devries (Czechoslovakia) K Zakopalová	2	6^{2}
(Czechoslovakia) I Jankovská (Czechoslovakia) E Melicharová	6	7^{7}
(Germany) S Hack (Austria) H Sprung	4	5
(Italy) S Farina (Australia) K Godridge	6	7
(Japan) N Miyagi (Indonesia) S Wibowo	7	1	5
2	(Soviet Union) L Neiland (Soviet Union) N Zvereva	5	6	7

Second round
5	(United States) K Jordan (United States) M McGrath	6	6
(Switzerland) M Maleeva-Fragniere (Switzerland) M Strebel	1	3
(Italy) L Garrone (Germany) K Kschwendt	2	3
12	(France) N Tauziat (Austria) J Wiesner	6	6
(Soviet Union) E Brioukhovets (Soviet Union) E Maniokova	3	6	4
(Czechoslovakia) I Jankovská (Czechoslovakia) E Melicharová	6	1	6
(Italy) S Farina (Australia) K Godridge	2	3
2	(Soviet Union) L Neiland (Soviet Union) N Zvereva	6	6

Third round
5	(United States) K Jordan (United States) M McGrath	4	6	8
12	(France) N Tauziat (Austria) J Wiesner	6	2	6
(Czechoslovakia) I Jankovská (Czechoslovakia) E Melicharová	2	4
2	(Soviet Union) L Neiland (Soviet Union) N Zvereva	6	6

Quarterfinals
5	(United States) K Jordan (United States) M McGrath	3	7	0
2	(Soviet Union) L Neiland (Soviet Union) N Zvereva	6	5	6
