= Goxhill (disambiguation) =

Goxhill may refer to:

- Goxhill, East Riding of Yorkshire
- Goxhill, Lincolnshire
- RAF Goxhill, former Air Force station
