= Lorrayne Gracie =

British tennis player

- Full name: Lorrayne Gracie-Safiruddin
- Country (sports): United Kingdom
- Born: 3 March 1964 (age 61)
- Prize money: $10,618

Singles
- Highest ranking: No. 475 (21 December 1986)

Grand Slam singles results
- Wimbledon: Q3 (1985)

Doubles
- Highest ranking: No. 179 (21 December 1986)

Grand Slam doubles results
- Wimbledon: 2R (1986)

Grand Slam mixed doubles results
- Wimbledon: 2R (1985)

Lorrayne Gracie-Safiruddin (born 3 March 1964) is a British former professional tennis player.

Born in 1964, Gracie started playing tennis at the age of 10 while growing up in Cheshire and attended Culcheth Hall School. Her father Malcolm was also a tennis player, but is better known as a former president of the Lawn Tennis Association.

Gracie competed on the professional tour in the 1980s and featured on several occasions in the qualifying or main draws at Wimbledon. She reached the third qualifying round in 1985, beating future finalist Nathalie Tauziat en route. All of her main draw appearances at Wimbledon came in doubles.

== ITF finals ==
=== Doubles: 8 (0–8) ===
Result	No.	Date	Tournament	Surface	Partner	Opponents	Score
Loss	1.	21 August 1983	Hechingen, West Germany	Clay	(United Kingdom) Jo Louis	(Japan) Emiko Okagawa (Japan) Kumiko Okamoto	2–6, 0–6
Loss	2.	13 May 1984	Sutton, United Kingdom	Clay	(United Kingdom) Elizabeth Jones	(United States) Kristin Kinney (United States) Donna Rubin	3–6, 2–6
Loss	3.	18 November 1984	Tipton, United Kingdom	Hard	(United Kingdom) Elizabeth Jones	(United States) Holly Danforth (United States) Kirsten Dreyer	3–6, 6–3, 3–6
Loss	4.	17 March 1985	Porto Alegre, Brazil	Clay	(United Kingdom) Rina Einy	(Argentina) Mariana Perez-Roldan (Argentina) Patricia Tarabini	6–7, 6–3^{(0)}, 4–6
Loss	5.	15 April 1985	Cumberland, United Kingdom	Hard	(West Germany) Martina Reinhardt	(South Africa) Elna Reinach (South Africa) Monica Reinach	2–6, 4–6
Loss	6.	29 April 1985	Sutton, United Kingdom	Hard	(West Germany) Martina Reinhardt	(China) Li Xinyi (China) Zhong Ni	3–6, 3–6
Loss	7.	5 August 1985	Rheda, West Germany	Clay	(United Kingdom) Belinda Borneo	(West Germany) Silke Meier (West Germany) Claudia Porwik	6–4, 6–7, 1–6
Loss	8.	7 November 1986	Queens, United Kingdom	Grass	(United Kingdom) Joy Tacon	(United Kingdom) Sally Timms (United Kingdom) Katie Rickett	4–6, 3–6
