= Ivana Jankovská =

Czech tennis player

- Country (sports): Czechoslovakia; Czech Republic
- Born: November 17, 1963 (age 62) Přerov, Czechoslovakia
- Retired: 1994
- Prize money: $37,120

Singles
- Career record: 31–44
- Highest ranking: No. 465 (13 August 1990)

Doubles
- Career record: 104–48
- Career titles: 0 WTA / 14 ITF
- Highest ranking: No. 103 (15 April 1991)

Grand Slam doubles results
- French Open: 3R (1991)
- Wimbledon: 1R (1991)
- US Open: 1R (1991, 1992)

Ivana Jankovská (born 17 November 1963) is a Czech former professional tennis player.

== Biography ==
Born in Přerov, Jankovská began competing on the professional tour in 1989.

Jankovská was most successful as a doubles player, with 14 ITF titles and a best ranking of 103 in the world. At grand slam level, Jankovská's best performance came at the 1991 French Open, where she and her regular doubles partner Eva Melicharová made the round of 16 of the women's doubles.

Retiring from tennis in 1994, Jankovská now runs a tennis school in Freiberg, Germany.

== ITF finals ==
=== Doubles (14–11) ===
Legend
$25,000 tournaments
$10,000 tournaments

Result	No.	Date	Tournament	Surface	Partner	Opponents	Score
Win	1.	24 April 1989	Dubrovnik, Yugoslavia	Clay	(Czechoslovakia) Eva Melicharová	(Australia) Lily Nejasmic (Australia) Mary Nejasmic	1–0 ret.
Loss	2.	29 May 1989	Katowice, Poland	Clay	(Czechoslovakia) Eva Melicharová	(Poland) Sylvia Czopek (Poland) Magdalena Feistel	3–6, 6–4, 1–6
Win	3.	7 August 1989	Paderborn, West Germany	Clay	(Czechoslovakia) Eva Melicharová	(Soviet Union) Elena Brioukhovets (Soviet Union) Eugenia Maniokova	6–4, 6–2
Win	4.	14 August 1989	Rebecq, Belgium	Clay	(Czechoslovakia) Eva Melicharová	(Israel) Medi Dadoch (Bulgaria) Svetlana Krivencheva	6–1, 6–3
Loss	5.	18 September 1989	Rabac, Yugoslavia	Clay	(Czechoslovakia) Eva Melicharová	(Soviet Union) Agnese Blumberga (Czechoslovakia) Kateřina Šišková	1–6, 4–6
Win	6.	25 September 1989	Mali Lošinj, Yugoslavia	Clay	(Czechoslovakia) Eva Melicharová	(Czechoslovakia) Karin Baleková (Czechoslovakia) Jitka Dubcová	6–2, 6–2
Win	7.	9 October 1989	Bol, Yugoslavia	Clay	(Czechoslovakia) Eva Melicharová	(Czechoslovakia) Radka Bobková (Czechoslovakia) Petra Raclavská	6–3, 3–6, 6–2
Win	8.	16 October 1989	Supetar, Yugoslavia	Clay	(Czechoslovakia) Eva Melicharová	(Soviet Union) Agnese Blumberga (Soviet Union) Svetlana Komleva	6–2, 6–3
Loss	9.	26 February 1990	Ashkelon, Israel	Hard	(Czechoslovakia) Eva Melicharová	(South Africa) Michelle Anderson (South Africa) Robyn Field	3–6, 4–6
Loss	10.	5 March 1990	Haifa, Israel	Hard	(Czechoslovakia) Eva Melicharová	(South Africa) Michelle Anderson (South Africa) Robyn Field	2–6, 2–6
Win	11.	16 April 1990	Naples, Italy	Clay	(Czechoslovakia) Eva Melicharová	(Czechoslovakia) Michaela Frimmelová (Hungary) Réka Szikszay	6–3, 6–4
Win	12.	4 June 1990	Mantua, Italy	Clay	(Czechoslovakia) Eva Melicharová	(Indonesia) Yayuk Basuki (Indonesia) Suzanna Wibowo	6–3, 7–5
Loss	13.	2 July 1990	Vaihingen, West Germany	Clay	(Czechoslovakia) Eva Melicharová	(Australia) Kerry-Anne Guse (Australia) Danielle Jones	4–6, 7–6, 3–6
Loss	14.	20 May 1991	Katowice, Poland	Clay	(Czechoslovakia) Eva Melicharová	(Poland) Magdalena Feistel (Czechoslovakia) Helena Vildová	4–6, 7–6, 0–6
Loss	15.	1 June 1992	Brindisi, Poland	Clay	(Czechoslovakia) Eva Melicharová	(Italy) Nathalie Baudone (Italy) Cristina Salvi	6–4, 3–6, 2–6
Win	16.	13 July 1992	Sezze, Italy	Clay	(Czechoslovakia) Eva Melicharová	(Australia) Justine Hodder (Australia) Kirrily Sharpe	7–6^{(1)}, 5–7, 7–5
Win	17.	10 May 1993	Putignano, Italy	Hard	(Czech Republic) Eva Melicharová	(Italy) Susanna Attili (Italy) Elena Savoldi	6–3, 6–7^{(6)}, 6–4
Win	18.	19 July 1993	Sezze, Italy	Clay	(Czech Republic) Eva Melicharová	(Argentina) Laura Montalvo (Argentina) Valentina Solari	6–2, 7–5
Loss	19.	6 September 1993	Klagenfurt, Austria	Clay	(Czech Republic) Eva Melicharová	(Czech Republic) Květa Peschke (Czech Republic) Jana Pospíšilová	4–6, 6–7
Win	20.	20 September 1993	Capua, Italy	Clay	(Czech Republic) Eva Melicharová	(Italy) Flora Perfetti (Italy) Francesca Romano	6–3, 3–6, 7–6
Win	21.	27 September 1993	Kirchheim, Austria	Clay	(Czech Republic) Eva Melicharová	(Czech Republic) Petra Kučová (Czech Republic) Kateřina Šišková	6–1, 6–7, 6–1
Loss	22.	6 September 1993	Vítkovice, Czech Republic	Hard	(Czech Republic) Eva Melicharová	(Czech Republic) Květa Peschke (Czech Republic) Dominika Gorecká	5–7, 6–2, 6–7
Win	23.	13 December 1993	Přerov, Czech Republic	Hard	(Czech Republic) Eva Melicharová	(Hungary) Rita Kuti-Kis (Hungary) Petra Mandula	3–6, 7–5, 6–1
Loss	24.	31 January 1994	Coburg, Germany	Carpet	(Czech Republic) Eva Melicharová	(Poland) Katharzyna Teodorowicz (Czech Republic) Helena Vildová	2–6, 6–7
Loss	25.	14 March 1994	Reims, France	Clay	(Czech Republic) Eva Melicharová	(Netherlands) Gaby Coorengel (United Kingdom) Alison Smith	6–4, 6–7, 5–7
