= St Giles' Church, Goxhill =

Church in the East Riding of Yorkshire, England

Coordinates: 53°53′10″N 0°11′54″W

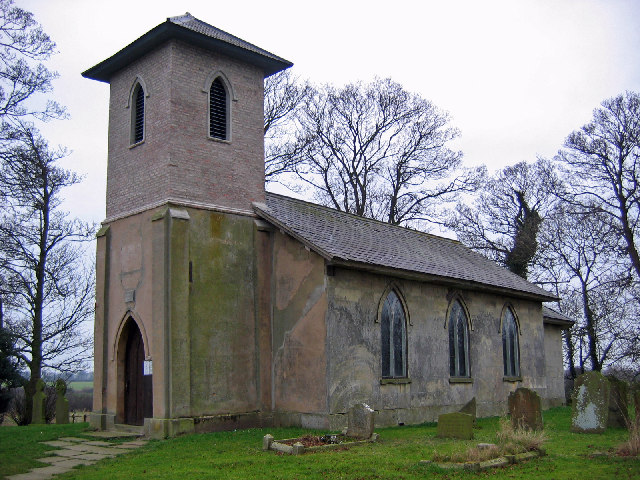
The church, in 2006

St Giles' Church is an Anglican church in the hamlet of Goxhill, East Riding of Yorkshire, England.

There was a church in Goxhill by the 13th century. It was largely rebuilt in 1786 and the tower was again rebuilt in 1817. The whole church was demolished and a new church constructed in 1840. The tower was repaired in 1860, and the church was grade II listed in 1985.

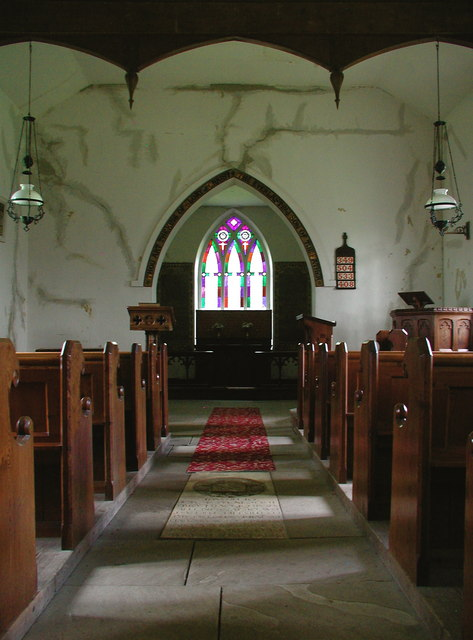
View from the nave into the chancel

The church is built of stone, brick and cobbles, partly rendered, and has overhanging slate roofs. It consists of a nave, a chancel with a polygonal apse, and a west tower. The tower has three stages, a plinth, pilaster buttresses, a pointed west doorway over which is a hood mould and an inscribed and dated plaque, pointed bell openings with hood moulds, and a pyramidal roof. Inside, there is a 15th-century piscina with an ogee canopy, and a heavily-repaired 12th-century tub font.

== See also ==
- Grade II* listed buildings in the East Riding of Yorkshire
- Listed buildings in Hatfield, East Riding of Yorkshire
