= Listed buildings in Hatfield, East Riding of Yorkshire =

Hatfield is a civil parish in the county of the East Riding of Yorkshire, England. It contains three listed buildings that are recorded in the National Heritage List for England. All the listed buildings are designated at Grade II, the lowest of the three grades, which is applied to "buildings of national importance and special interest". The parish contains the villages of Goxhill, Great Hatfield and Little Hatfield, and the surrounding countryside. The listed buildings consist of a wayside cross, a church and a war memorial.

== Buildings ==
Name and location	Photograph	Date	Notes
Wayside Cross; 53.86831°N 0.19502°W		Medieval	The cross, which stands on a triangle of grass at the road T-junction, is in limestone. It has a plinth with carvings of beasts, on a stepped base, carrying an incomplete tapering four-sided shaft with geometrical patterns and edge roll-mouldings.
St Giles' Church, Goxhill; 53.88609°N 0.19825°W		1840	The church, which was rebuilt in this year, is built in stone, brick and cobbles, partly rendered, and has overhanging slate roofs. It consists of a nave, a chancel with a polygonal apse, and a west tower. The tower has three stages, a plinth, pilaster buttresses, a pointed west doorway over which is a hood mould and an inscribed and dated plaque, pointed bell openings with hood moulds, and a pyramidal roof.
Great Hatfield War Memorial; 53.86882°N 0.19973°W		1919	The war memorial is in a grassed area to the north of Main Street, and is about 2.4 metres (7 ft 10 in) in height. It is in Portland stone, and consists of an obelisk on a tall square plinth with a moulded capital, on a base of two steps. On the front of the plinth and the top step are inscriptions, the name of one who was lost in the First World War, and the names of those who served.
