= Monica Reinach =

South African tennis player

- Full name: Monica Reinach
- Country (sports): South Africa
- Born: 29 September 1966 (age 58); Pretoria, South Africa
- Retired: 1991
- Prize money: $31,354

Singles
- Career record: 16–36
- Highest ranking: No. 243 (21 December 1986)

Doubles
- Career record: 78–45
- Career titles: 10 ITF
- Highest ranking: No. 75 (8 June 1987)

Grand Slam doubles results
- French Open: 2R (1986, 1987)
- Wimbledon: 3R (1986)
- US Open: 2R (1987)

Monica Reinach (born 29 September 1966) is a former professional tennis player from South Africa.

== Biography ==
A doubles specialist from Pretoria, Reinach competed on the professional tour in the 1980s. She is the elder sister of Elna Reinach, with whom she made the round of 16 of the women's doubles at the 1986 Wimbledon Championships. In 1987 she reached a career best doubles ranking of 75 in the world. She was a member of three World TeamTennis title winning teams, with Charlotte Heat in 1987 and 1988, then at the San Antonio Racquets in 1989. A knee injury caused the end of her professional tennis career.

She is married to South African former top 20 tennis player Christo van Rensburg. The couple live in Austin, Texas.

== ITF finals ==
Legend
$25,000 tournaments
$10,000 tournaments

=== Doubles (10–3) ===
| Result | No | Date | Tournament | Surface | Partner | Opponents | Score |
|---|---|---|---|---|---|---|---|
| Win | 1. | 9 December 1984 | Hull, United Kingdom | Hard | (South Africa) Elna Reinach | (United Kingdom) Cathy Drury (United Kingdom) Ellinore Lightbody | 6-3, 6-3 |
| Win | 2. | 15 April 1985 | Cumberland, United Kingdom | Hard | (South Africa) Elna Reinach | (United Kingdom) Lorrayne Gracie (West Germany) Martina Reinhardt | 6-2, 6-4 |
| Win | 3. | 28 April 1985 | Hatfield, United Kingdom | Hard | (South Africa) Elna Reinach | (China) Li Xinyi (China) Zhong Ni | 2-6, 6-2, 9-7 |
| Loss | 4. | 6 May 1985 | Bournemouth, United Kingdom | Hard | (South Africa) Elna Reinach | (China) Li Xinyi (China) Zhong Ni | 7–5, 5–7, 4–6 |
| Win | 5. | 20 May 1985 | Bath, United Kingdom | Clay | (South Africa) Elna Reinach | (United Kingdom) Belinda Borneo (United Kingdom) Joy Tacon | 6–3, 6–3 |
| Win | 6. | 14 July 1985 | Miramar, United States | Hard | (Brazil) Luciana Corsato-Owsianka | (Australia) Jackie Masters (New Zealand) Michelle Parun | 6-3, 4-6, 6-3 |
| Win | 7. | 29 September 1985 | Baltimore, United States | Hard | (United States) Mary Dailey | (United States) Deeann Hansel (United States) Carol Watson | 7-5, 6-4 |
| Loss | 8. | 10 January 1986 | Miami, United States | Hard | (South Africa) Elna Reinach | (Czechoslovakia) Jana Novotná (Japan) Fukiko Osawa | 7-6, 2-6, 2-6 |
| Loss | 9. | 19 April 1986 | Cumberland, United Kingdom | Hard | (United Kingdom) Joy Tacon | (United Kingdom) Jane Wood (United Kingdom) Belinda Borneo | 4–6, 3–6 |
| Win | 10. | 27 April 1986 | Hatfield, United Kingdom | Hard | (United Kingdom) Joy Tacon | (Sweden) Catrin Jexell (Sweden) Helena Olsson | 6–1, 5–7, 6–3 |
| Win | 11. | 17 November 1986 | Johannesburg, South Africa | Hard | (South Africa) Elna Reinach | (United States) Mary Dailey (South Africa) Dianne Van Rensburg | 1–6, 6–1, 6–3 |
| Win | 12. | 15 December 1986 | Johannesburg, South Africa | Hard | (South Africa) Elna Reinach | (United Kingdom) Katie Rickett (United Kingdom) Valda Lake | 6–4, 6–2 |
| Win | 13. | 5 March 1989 | Pretoria, South Africa | Hard | (South Africa) Rene Mentz | (South Africa) Michelle Anderson (South Africa) Linda Barnard | 6–1, 2–6, 6–4 |
