= Maite Martínez =

Maite Martínez may refer to:

- Maite Martínez Pérez (b. 1967), Spanish former professional tennis player
- Mayte Martínez (b. 1976), Spanish athlete competing in the 800 m.
- Maytee Martinez (b. 1992), Cuban American model, designer, and television personality
