= Michelle Anderson (tennis) =

South African tennis player

- Full name: Michelle Anderson D'Aloisio
- Country (sports): South Africa
- Born: 27 January 1972 (age 53)
- Prize money: $17,757

Singles
- Highest ranking: No. 261 (11 June 1990)

Doubles
- Career titles: 0 WTA / 13 ITF
- Highest ranking: No. 124 (17 September 1990)

Michelle Anderson D'Aloisio (born 27 January 1972) is a former professional tennis player from South Africa.

== Biography ==
Anderson, who grew up in Benoni, was a girls' singles semi-finalist at the 1989 Wimbledon Championships.

On the professional tour, Anderson competed in ITF circuit events and was most successful in doubles, with a best ranking of 124 in the world. She won eight ITF doubles titles with countrywoman Robyn Field and 13 in total. Her career was curtailed by a wrist injury, which caused her to miss much of 1990 and 1991.

From 1994 to 1997 she played college tennis in the United States for the University of Georgia. A four-time doubles All-American, she was a member of Georgia's NCAA Division I Women's Tennis Championship winning team in 1994.

She is now living in the United States.

== ITF finals ==
=== Doubles (13-7) ===
$25,000 tournaments
$10,000 tournaments

Result	No.	Date	Tournament	Surface	Partner	Opponent	Score
Win	1.	20 February 1989	Bloemfontein, South Africa	Hard	(South Africa) Linda Barnard	(South Africa) Gail Boon (South Africa) Robyn Field	2–6, 7–5, 6–3
Loss	2.	27 February 1989	Pretoria, South Africa	Hard	(South Africa) Linda Barnard	(South Africa) Rene Mentz (South Africa) Monica Reinach	1–6, 6–2, 4–6
Win	3.	10 April 1989	Limoges, France	Clay	(France) Emmanuelle Derly	(South Africa) Robyn Field (Sweden) Eva Lena Olsson	7–5, 6–0
Win	4.	29 May 1989	Florence, Italy	Clay	(Finland) Nanne Dahlman	(Italy) Nathalie Baudone (Italy) Caterina Nozzoli	6–3, 6–3
Loss	5.	12 June 1989	Algarve, Portugal	Hard	(South Africa) Robyn Field	(Netherlands) Ingelise Driehuis (Brazil) Themis Zambrzycki	2–6, 6–4, 0–6
Win	6.	30 October 1989	Jerusalem, Israel	Clay	(South Africa) Robyn Field	(Czechoslovakia) Alice Noháčová (Republic of Ireland) Lesley O'Halloran	6–4, 6–1
Win	7.	6 November 1989	Haifa, Israel	Hard	(South Africa) Robyn Field	(Czechoslovakia) Alice Noháčová (Republic of Ireland) Lesley O'Halloran	6–3, 6–3
Loss	8.	13 November 1989	Ashkelon, Israel	Clay	(South Africa) Robyn Field	(Czechoslovakia) Alice Noháčová (Republic of Ireland) Lesley O'Halloran	6–7, 4–6
Win	9.	20 November 1989	Tel Aviv, Israel	Clay	(South Africa) Robyn Field	(Czechoslovakia) Alice Noháčová (Republic of Ireland) Lesley O'Halloran	6–3, 6–3
Win	10.	19 February 1990	Manchester, United Kingdom	Carpet	(United Kingdom) Virginia Humphreys-Davies	(Netherlands) Gaby Coorengel (Netherlands) Amy van Buuren	6–2, 6–2
Win	11.	26 February 1990	Ashkelon, Israel	Hard	(South Africa) Robyn Field	(Czechoslovakia) Ivana Jankovská (Czechoslovakia) Eva Melicharová	6–3, 6–4
Win	12.	5 March 1990	Haifa, Israel	Hard	(South Africa) Robyn Field	(Czechoslovakia) Ivana Jankovská (Czechoslovakia) Eva Melicharová	6–2, 6–2
Win	13.	12 March 1990	Jaffa, Israel	Hard	(South Africa) Robyn Field	(Netherlands) Miriam Oremans (Netherlands) Nicolette Rooimans	7–5, 6–4
Win	14.	19 March 1990	Ramat Hasharon, Israel	Hard	(South Africa) Robyn Field	(Czechoslovakia) Petra Holubová (Czechoslovakia) Sylvia Štefková	6–3, 6–0
Win	15.	14 May 1990	Ramat Hasharon, Israel	Hard	(South Africa) Robyn Field	(Australia) Kerry-Anne Guse (United Kingdom) Julie Salmon	6–3, 6–2
Loss	16.	23 March 1992	Newcastle, Australia	Clay	(Australia) Jane Taylor	(New Zealand) Julie Richardson (New Zealand) Amanda Trail	4–6, 2–6
Win	17.	18 May 1992	Haifa, Israel	Hard	(Israel) Limor Zaltz	(South Africa) Rikki Gaddie (South Africa) Toni Gaddie	0–6, 6–3, 6–2
Loss	18.	25 May 1992	Ashkelon, Israel	Hard	(Israel) Limor Zaltz	(Israel) Ilana Berger (Netherlands) Petra Kamstra	2–6, 6–2, 4–6
Loss	19.	22 March 1993	Harare, Zimbabwe	Hard	(South Africa) Kim Grant	(Zimbabwe) Paula Iversen (United States) Claire Sessions Bailey	1–6, 3–6
Loss	20.	17 May 1993	Kotowi, Poland	Clay	(Czech Republic) Katerina Zajacová	(Poland) Patrycia Gajdzik (Poland) Aleksandra Olsza	4–6, 6–4, 6–7
