= Christina Singer =

German tennis player

- Country (sports): Germany; West Germany
- Born: 27 July 1968 (age 57) Göppingen, West Germany
- Height: 1.76 m (5 ft 9 1/2 in)
- Turned pro: 1984
- Retired: 1999
- Prize money: $517,704

Singles
- Career record: 162–168
- Career titles: 5 ITF
- Highest ranking: No. 41 (11 September 1995)

Grand Slam singles results
- Australian Open: 2R (1987, 1989, 1994, 1995)
- French Open: 2R (1995)
- Wimbledon: 3R (1995)
- US Open: 3R (1993)

Doubles
- Career record: 100–130
- Career titles: 3 ITF
- Highest ranking: No. 44 (8 July 1996)

Grand Slam doubles results
- Australian Open: 2R (1989, 1995, 1999)
- French Open: 3R (1994)
- Wimbledon: 3R (1996)
- US Open: 2R (1995, 1995)

Christina Singer-Bath (born 27 July 1968) is a retired tennis player from Germany. She competed at Wimbledon several times from 1987 to 1999.

== WTA Tour finals ==
=== Doubles; 1 (runner-up) ===
Result	Date	Tournament	Surface	Partner	Opponents	Score
Loss	Oct 1993	Essen, Germany	Hard	(Germany) Wiltrud Probst	(Spain) Arantxa Sánchez Vicario (Czech Republic) Helena Suková	2–6, 2–6

== ITF finals ==
=== Singles (5–1) ===
Legend
$25,000 tournaments
$10,000 tournaments

Result	No.	Date	Tournament	Surface	Opponent	Score
Win	1.	11 March 1985	Stockholm, Sweden	Clay	(Sweden) Maria Lindström	6–4, 7–5
Win	2.	21 July 1986	Stuttgart-Vaihingen, West Germany	Clay	(Czechoslovakia) Hana Fukárková	1–6, 6–1, 6–3
Win	3.	30 October 1989	Pforzheim, West Germany	Hard	(Czechoslovakia) Petra Holubová	6–2, 7–6
Win	4.	22 October 1990	Neumünster, West Germany	Clay	(West Germany) Andrea Müller	6–4, 6–3
Win	5.	6 May 1991	Lee-on-the-Solent, United Kingdom	Clay	(Germany) Anke Marchl	5–7, 6–4, 6–3
Loss	6.	7 December 1992	Val-d'Oise, France	Hard	(France) Nathalie Tauziat	3–6, 3–6

=== Doubles (3–1) ===
Result	No.	Date	Tournament	Surface	Partner	Opponents	Score
Win	1.	11 November 1985	Queens, United Kingdom	Hard	(Czechoslovakia) Petra Tesarová	(West Germany) Claudia Porwik (West Germany) Wiltrud Probst	5–7, 6–4, 6–3
Loss	2.	7 July 1986	Båstad, Sweden	Clay	(West Germany) Ellen Walliser	(Sweden) Maria Lindström (Sweden) Catarina Lindqvist	3–6, 2–6
Win	3.	22 October 1990	Neumünster, West Germany	Clay	(West Germany) Anke Marchl	(Sweden) Åsa Carlsson (Sweden) Marie Linusson	6–2, 7–5
Win	4.	6 May 1991	Lee-on-the-Solent, United Kingdom	Clay	(West Germany) Anke Marchl	(Australia) Catherine Barclay (Australia) Robyn Mawdsley	4–6, 7–6^{(3)}, 6–1
