= Magdalena Feistel =

Polish tennis player

- Country (sports): Poland
- Born: 22 August 1970 (age 56) Gdynia, Poland
- Height: 181 cm (5 ft 11 in)
- Retired: 1998
- Prize money: $99,651

Singles
- Career record: 123–120
- Career titles: 1 ITF
- Highest ranking: No. 192 (28 February 1994)

Grand Slam singles results
- Australian Open: 1R (1994)

Doubles
- Career record: 133–89
- Career titles: 11 ITF
- Highest ranking: No. 91 (20 June 1994)

Grand Slam doubles results
- Australian Open: 1R (1993, 1994, 1996)
- French Open: 2R (1994)

Team competitions
- Fed Cup: 23–20
Medal record
Representing Poland
Summer Universiade
Silver medal – second place	1997 Catania	Doubles

Magdalena Joanna Feistel (née Mróz; born 22 August 1970) is a former Polish tennis player. She holds the record for most Fed Cup ties played for Poland (24; 43 matches) and most Fed Cup wins for Poland (23).

In her career, she won one singles title and 11 doubles titles on tournaments of the ITF Circuit. Feistel's career-high singles ranking is world No. 192 (reached in February 1994), and her best doubles ranking, achieved in June 1994, is 91.

Her daughter Gina Feistel is also a professional tennis player who represents Poland.

== ITF Circuit finals ==
$50,000 tournaments
$25,000 tournaments
$10,000 tournaments

=== Singles: 4 (1–3) ===
Result	No.	Date	Tournament	Surface	Opponent	Score
Loss	1.	3 October 1988	ITF Šibenik, Yugoslavia	Clay	(Czechoslovakia) Eva Švíglerová	5–7, 4–6
Loss	2.	6 August 1990	ITF Koksijde, Belgium	Clay	(Belgium) Dominique Monami	2–7, 1–6
Loss	3.	21 January 1991	ITF Bergen, Norway	Carpet (i)	(Belgium) Els Callens	4–6, 3–6
Win	4.	13 November 1995	ITF Bad Gögging, Germany	Carpet (i)	(Russia) Tatiana Panova	1–6, 6–4, 6–3

=== Doubles: 20 (11–9) ===
Result	No.	Date	Tournament	Surface	Partner	Opponents	Score
Loss	1.	9 October 1988	ITF Mali Lošinj, Yugoslavia	Clay	(Poland) Sylwia Czopek	(Australia) Kate McDonald (Australia) Rennae Stubbs	3–6, 6–1, 2–6
Win	2.	29 May 1989	ITF Katowice, Poland	Clay	(Poland) Sylwia Czopek	(Czechoslovakia) Ivana Jankovská (Czechoslovakia) Eva Melicharová	6–3, 4–6, 6–1
Win	3.	18 July 1989	ITF Francavilla, Italy	Clay	(Poland) Sylwia Czopek	(Netherlands) Mara Eijkenboom (Spain) Ninoska Souto	6–3, 6–2
Loss	4.	23 October 1989	ITF Hokkaido, Japan	Hard	(Poland) Sylwia Czopek	(Japan) Yasuyo Kajita (Japan) Shiho Okada	6–7, 3–6
Win	5.	8 October 1990	ITF Bol, Yugoslavia	Clay	(Romania) Irina Spîrlea	(Czechoslovakia) Zdeňka Málková (Czechoslovakia) Eva Martincová	4–6, 6–3, 6–1
Win	6.	26 November 1990	ITF Érd, Hungary	Clay	(Poland) Katarzyna Teodorowicz	(Czechoslovakia) Lucie Ludvigová (Czechoslovakia) Helena Vildová	5–7, 6–4, 6–2
Win	7.	21 January 1991	ITF Bergen, Norway	Carpet (i)	(Norway) Amy Jönsson Raaholt	(Denmark) Merete Balling-Stockmann (Switzerland) Natalie Tschan	6–2, 6–2
Win	8.	20 May 1991	ITF Katowice, Poland	Clay	(Czechoslovakia) Helena Vildová	(Czechoslovakia) Ivana Jankovská (Czechoslovakia) Eva Melicharová	6–4, 6–7^{(9–11)}, 6–0
Win	9.	27 May 1991	ITF Katowice, Poland	Clay	(Poland) Katarzyna Teodorowicz	(Czechoslovakia) Dominika Gorecká (Czechoslovakia) Zuzana Witzová	6–0, 5–7, 6–1
Loss	10.	28 September 1992	ITF Salisbury, United States	Hard	(Poland) Katarzyna Teodorowicz	(United States) Beverly Bowes (United States) Tammy Whittington	5–7, 6–2, 0–6
Win	11.	19 October 1992	ITF San Luis Potosí, Mexico	Hard	(Poland) Katarzyna Teodorowicz	(Mexico) Isabela Petrov (United States) Jolene Watanabe	4–6, 6–4, 6–4
Loss	12.	23 November 1992	ITF Nuriootpa, Australia	Hard	(Australia) Kirrily Sharpe	(Australia) Kerry-Anne Guse (Australia) Angie Woolcock	6–4, 6–7, 2–6
Win	13.	12 July 1993	ITF Darmstadt, Germany	Clay	(Poland) Katarzyna Teodorowicz	(Italy) Laura Garrone (Slovenia) Tina Križan	4–6, 6–4, 7–5
Win	14.	1 November 1993	ITF Vilamoura, Portugal	Hard	(Poland) Katarzyna Teodorowicz	(Spain) Gala León García (Spain) Ana Segura	7–6^{(7–1)}, 6–2
Win	15.	6 December 1993	ITF Val-d'Oise, France	Hard (i)	(Russia) Elena Makarova	(France) Isabelle Demongeot (France) Catherine Suire	2–6, 6–3, 6–4
Loss	16.	5 February 1995	ITF Coburg, Germany	Hard (i)	(Czech Republic) Helena Vildová	(Netherlands) Seda Noorlander (Germany) Marlene Weingärtner	2–6, 7–6, 2–6
Loss	17.	17 July 1995	ITF Darmstadt, Germany	Clay	(Czech Republic) Helena Vildová	(Bulgaria) Svetlana Krivencheva (Czech Republic) Květa Peschke	6–7^{(4–7)}, 2–6
Loss	18.	6 August 1995	ITF Budapest, Hungary	Clay	(Czech Republic) Helena Vildová	(Serbia and Montenegro) Tatjana Ječmenica (Bulgaria) Svetlana Krivencheva	4–6, 3–6
Loss	19.	20 October 1996	ITF Flensburg, Germany	Carpet (i)	(Czech Republic) Květa Peschke	(Sweden) Annica Lindstedt (Sweden) Anna-Karin Svensson	4–6, 2–6
Loss	20.	20 July 1997	ITF Darmstadt, Germany	Clay	(Russia) Olga Ivanova	(Bulgaria) Svetlana Krivencheva (Bulgaria) Pavlina Nola	0–6, 6–2, 3–6
