= Natalie Tschan =

Swiss tennis player (born 1971)

- Country (sports): Switzerland
- Born: 13 October 1971 (age 53)
- Prize money: $33,666

Singles
- Career record: 71–66
- Career titles: 1 ITF
- Highest ranking: No. 242 (28 September 1992)

Doubles
- Career record: 69–46
- Career titles: 4 ITF
- Highest ranking: No. 107 (8 February 1993)

Grand Slam doubles results
- Australian Open: 2R (1993)

Natalie Tschan (born 13 October 1971) is a Swiss former professional tennis player.

Tschan, who comes from Bern, reached a best singles ranking of No. 242 on the professional tour. She featured in the singles qualifying draw at the 1993 Australian Open and played in the main draw of the doubles, making it through to the second round with partner Alexandra Fusai.

== ITF Circuit finals ==
$25,000 tournaments
$10,000 tournaments

=== Singles: 3 (1–2) ===
| Result | No. | Date | Tournament | Surface | Opponent | Score |
|---|---|---|---|---|---|---|
| Loss | 1. | 18 September 1989 | ITF Rabac, Yugoslavia | Clay | (Soviet Union) Agnese Blumberga | 6–4, 5–7, 3–6 |
| Loss | 2. | 14 October 1991 | ITF Burgdorf, Switzerland | Carpet | (Switzerland) Michèle Strebel | 3–6, 6–7^{(7)} |
| Win | 1. | 21 October 1991 | ITF Lyss, Switzerland | Hard | (Socialist Federal Republic of Yugoslavia) Maja Palaveršić | 1–6, 3–6 |

=== Doubles: 12 (4–8) ===
| Result | No. | Date | Tournament | Surface | Partner | Opponents | Score |
|---|---|---|---|---|---|---|---|
| Win | 1. | 1 May 1989 | ITF Sezze, Italy | Clay | (Denmark) Henriette Kjær Nielsen | (Hungary) Virág Csurgó (Hungary) Nóra Köves | 6–0, 3–6, 6–3 |
| Loss | 1. | 24 September 1990 | ITF Napoli, Italy | Clay | (Czechoslovakia) Klára Bláhová | (Czechoslovakia) Lucie Ludvigová (Czechoslovakia) Helena Vildová | 3–6, 2–6 |
| Loss | 2. | 15 October 1990 | ITF Burgdorf, Switzerland | Carpet (i) | (Switzerland) Michèle Strebel | (West Germany) Sabine Lohmann (Netherlands) Claire Wegink | 6–4, 2–6, 4–6 |
| Loss | 3. | 21 January 1991 | ITF Bergen, Norway | Carpet (i) | (Denmark) Merete Balling-Stockmann | (Poland) Magdalena Feistel (Norway) Amy Jönsson Raaholt | 2–6, 2–6 |
| Loss | 4. | 28 January 1991 | ITF Danderyd, Sweden | Carpet (i) | (Denmark) Merete Balling-Stockmann | (Germany) Anke Marchl (Netherlands) Dorien Wamelink | 4–6, 4–6 |
| Win | 2. | 6 May 1991 | ITF Lerida, Spain | Clay | (Czechoslovakia) Jitka Dubcová | (France) Nathalie Ballet (France) Agnes Romand | 6–0, 6–3 |
| Loss | 5. | 14 October 1991 | ITF Burgdorf, Switzerland | Carpet (i) | (Switzerland) Michèle Strebel | (Ukraine) Olga Lugina (Israel) Nelly Barkan | 4–6, 6–1, 4–6 |
| Loss | 6. | 14 June 1992 | ITF Modena, Italy | Clay | (France) Alexandra Fusai | (Romania) Ruxandra Dragomir (Bulgaria) Elena Pampoulova | 3–6, 6–7 |
| Win | 3. | 22 June 1992 | ITF Reggio Emilia, Italy | Clay | (Romania) Ruxandra Dragomir | (France) Barbara Collet (France) Alexandra Fusai | 3–6, 6–2, 6–1 |
| Loss | 7. | 15 November 1992 | ITF Manchester, United Kingdom | Carpet (i) | (Bulgaria) Elena Pampoulova | (Russia) Elena Likhovtseva (Russia) Elena Makarova | 3–6, 4–6 |
| Loss | 8. | 11 October 1993 | ITF Burgdorf, Switzerland | Hard (i) | (Switzerland) Geraldine Dondit | (Czech Republic) Lenka Cenková (Czech Republic) Alena Vašková | 6–1, 4–6, 3–6 |
| Win | 4. | 18 October 1993 | ITF Langenthal, Switzerland | Carpet (i) | (Switzerland) Miroslava Vavrinec | (France) Anne De Gioanni (Austria) Heidi Sprung | 6–4, 4–6, 6–1 |
