= Lone Vandborg =

Danish tennis player

- Country (sports): Denmark
- Born: 5 August 1961 (age 63); Vanløse, Denmark
- Prize money: $15,300

Singles
- Career record: 26–58
- Career titles: 0
- Highest ranking: No. 384 (2 February 1987)

Doubles
- Career record: 70–43
- Career titles: 7 ITF
- Highest ranking: No. 185 (25 September 1989)

Grand Slam doubles results
- Australian Open: 1R (1990)

Lone Vandborg (born 5 August 1961) is a Danish former professional tennis player.

Vandborg played Federation Cup tennis for Denmark in 1986 and 1987, appearing in a total of six ties. This included a World Group win over Great Britain, where Vandborg had a win over Anne Hobbs.

While competing on the professional circuit she was most successful as a doubles player, with a career high ranking of 185 and seven ITF titles to her name. She featured in the main draw of the women's doubles at the 1990 Australian Open.

== ITF finals ==
Legend
$75,000 tournaments
$10,000 tournaments

=== Doubles: 13 (7–6) ===
Result	No.	Date	Tournament	Surface	Partner	Opponents	Score
Loss	1.	28 April 1986	Sutton, United Kingdom	Grass	(Sweden) Anneli Björk	(United States) Susan Pendo (Netherlands) Digna Ketelaar	6–7, 0–6
Loss	2.	2 February 1987	Hørsholm, Denmark	Carpet (i)	(Sweden) Maria Ekstrand	(Sweden) Maria Strandlund (Sweden) Jonna Jonerup	1–6, 3–6
Loss	3.	27 April 1987	Sutton, United Kingdom	Hard (i)	(Netherlands) Titia Wilmink	(South Africa) Linda Barnard (United Kingdom) Belinda Borneo	6–2, 5–7, 6–7
Loss	4.	4 May 1987	Bournemouth, United Kingdom	Hard	(Netherlands) Titia Wilmink	(Spain) Rosa Bielsa (Spain) Ana Segura	4–6, 5–7
Loss	5.	23 April 1988	Queens, United Kingdom	Clay	(Republic of Ireland) Lesley O'Halloran	(United Kingdom) Anne Simpkin (United Kingdom) Joy Tacon	6–4, 2–6, 6–7
Win	1.	24 July 1988	León, Mexico	Hard	(United States) Karen Buchholz	(United States) Jamie Pisarcik (Peru) Karim Strohmeier	6–3, 3–6, 7–6
Win	2.	29 January 1989	Helsinki, Finland	Hard	(United Kingdom) Belinda Borneo	(West Germany) Sylvia Freye (United States) Anne-Marie Walson	6–2, 6–7^{(6)}, 6–2
Win	3.	5 February 1989	Stockholm, Sweden	Hard (i)	(United Kingdom) Belinda Borneo	(West Germany) Vera-Carina Elter (West Germany) Ingrid Peltzer	6–1, 6–1
Win	4.	13 February 1989	Hørsholm, Denmark	Carpet	(Denmark) Tine Scheuer-Larsen	(United States) Vincenza Procacci (United States) Anne-Marie Walson	6–1, 7–5
Loss	6.	6 March 1989	Ashkelon, Israel	Hard	(Denmark) Sofie Albinus	(Netherlands) Marianne van der Torre (Netherlands) Caroline Vis	1–6, 1–6
Win	5.	25 June 1989	Querétaro, Mexico	Hard	(Denmark) Henriette Kjær Nielsen	(United States) Leslie Hakala (United States) Vincenza Procacci	6–4, 2–6, 7–6
Win	6.	2 July 1989	Guadalajara, Mexico	Clay	(Denmark) Henriette Kjær Nielsen	(United States) Alysia May (United States) Kimberly Po	6–3, 3–6, 6–2
Win	7.	24 July 1989	Haifa, Israel	Hard	(Denmark) Sofie Albinus	(Sweden) Malin Nilsson (Sweden) Eva Lena Olsson	6–1, 6–4
