= Alice Noháčová =

Czech tennis player

- Country (sports): Czechoslovakia; Czech Republic
- Born: 20 June 1967 (age 57); Prague, Czechoslovakia
- Prize money: $32,940

Singles
- Career titles: 0
- Highest ranking: No. 352 (19 November 1990)

Doubles
- Career titles: 4 ITF
- Highest ranking: No. 115 (14 September 1992)

Grand Slam doubles results
- French Open: 1R (1991, 1992)
- Wimbledon: 2R (1991)
- US Open: 1R (1991)

Alice Noháčová (born 20 June 1967) is a Czech former professional tennis player.

== Biography ==
Born in Prague, Noháčová started out on the professional tour in the late 1980s. From 1989, she began making the main draw of WTA Tour events, where she featured mostly as a doubles player. She was ranked as high as 115 in the world for doubles and twice reached the semifinals of the Linz Open. Her best performance at Grand Slam level was a second-round appearance in the women's doubles at the 1991 Wimbledon Championships, partnering Iva Budařová.

Noháčová was previously married to Czech tennis player David Rikl. Together they had two sons, Philip and Patrik. The youngest, Patrik, was a top junior player, winning the 2016 French Open boys' doubles title.

== ITF finals ==
=== Doubles (4–7) ===
Result	No.	Date	Tournament	Surface	Partner	Opponents	Score
Win	1.	8 October 1984	ITF Sofia, Bulgaria	Clay	(Czechoslovakia) Regina Rajchrtová	(Czechoslovakia) Regina Maršíková (Socialist Federal Republic of Yugoslavia) Renata Šašak	6–2, 7–5
Win	2.	28 July 1986	Neumünster, West Germany	Clay	(Czechoslovakia) Denisa Krajčovičová	(Switzerland) Céline Cohen (Argentina) Susana Maria Villaverde	7–6, 6–3
Loss	3.	22 September 1986	Bol, Yugoslavia	Clay	(Czechoslovakia) Denisa Krajčovičová	(Italy) Silvia La Fratta (Italy) Barbara Romanò	5–7, 3–6
Win	4.	26 September 1988	Šibenik, Yugoslavia	Clay	(Czechoslovakia) Andrea Strnadová	(Czechoslovakia) Denisa Claassen (Netherlands) Judith Warringa	7–6, 6–0
Loss	5.	10 October 1988	Rabac, Yugoslavia	Clay	(Czechoslovakia) Andrea Strnadová	(Australia) Kate McDonald (Australia) Rennae Stubbs	0–6, 4–6
Loss	6.	19 June 1989	Madeira, Portugal	Hard	(Czechoslovakia) Petra Holubová	(Netherlands) Ingelise Driehuis (United Kingdom) Alexandra Niepel	3–6, 1–6
Loss	7.	30 October 1989	Jerusalem, Israel	Clay	(Republic of Ireland) Lesley O'Halloran	(South Africa) Michelle Anderson (South Africa) Robyn Field	4–6, 1–6
Loss	8.	6 November 1989	Haifa, Israel	Hard	(Republic of Ireland) Lesley O'Halloran	(South Africa) Michelle Anderson (South Africa) Robyn Field	3–6, 3–6
Win	9.	13 November 1989	Ashkelon, Israel	Clay	(Republic of Ireland) Lesley O'Halloran	(South Africa) Michelle Anderson (South Africa) Robyn Field	7–6, 6–4
Loss	10.	20 November 1989	Tel Aviv, Israel	Clay	(Republic of Ireland) Lesley O'Halloran	(South Africa) Michelle Anderson (South Africa) Robyn Field	3–6, 3–6
Loss	11.	6 August 1990	ITF Budapest, Hungary	Clay	(Czechoslovakia) Denisa Krajčovičová	(France) Sylvie Sabas (France) Sandrine Testud	3–6, 4–6
