= Joy Tacon =

British tennis player

- Country (sports): Hong Kong; Great Britain
- Born: 2 June 1961 (age 64)
- Plays: Right-handed
- Prize money: US$ 17,942

Singles
- Highest ranking: No. 180 (June/July 1980)

Grand Slam singles results
- Wimbledon: 1R (1985, 1986)

Doubles
- Career titles: 5 ITF
- Highest ranking: No. 161 (15 March 1987)

Grand Slam doubles results
- Wimbledon: 2R (1985)

Grand Slam mixed doubles results
- Wimbledon: 1R (1988)
Medal record
Representing Great Britain
Women's Tennis
Summer Universiade
Silver medal – second place	1985 Kobe	Women's Doubles

Joy Tacon (born 2 June 1961) is a British former professional tennis player.

Tacon was born in 1961 and is a graduate of Wycombe Abbey School. She attended the University of Houston on a tennis scholarship. At the 1985 University Games in Kobe, she teamed up with Liz Jones to win a silver medal for Great Britain in doubles.

A right-handed, Tacon competed on the professional tour from 1984 to 1988, reaching a career high ranking of 180 in the world. She twice received a wildcard into the singles main draw at Wimbledon and fell in the first round to seeded players both times, Kathy Jordan in 1985 and Hana Mandlíková in 1986. Her best Wimbledon performance was a second round appearance in the women's doubles at the 1985 Wimbledon Championships losing to Martina Navratilova and Pam Shriver. However, she also reached the first round in both the 1986 and 1988 Championships for doubles as well as qualifying and getting through to the first round in the mixed doubles with Mike Walker. They lost to Steffi Graf and Pavel Složil in that, the first, round of the 1988 Wimbledon Championships

After concluding her professional tennis career, Tacon set up the tennis programme at Putney High School, where she taught A-Level Economics (1990-1994). Additionally, she also set up the Young Enterprise scheme at Putney High, where it continues today.

From 1994-2003, she worked as the managing director of Smith Bernal International where, she set up the company from a base of operations in Hong Kong to provide court reporting and technology for litigation lawyers. Smith Bernal was acquired by Merrill Legal Solutions in 1997 and subsequently expanded throughout Asia, Australia and Hong Kong. From 2003-2007 she worked as a consultant for the aforementioned company.

Furthermore, since 1992–present she has been the managing director of a private property company and recently (2019–present) started working with Yoke, a Mental Health and Wellbeing Consultancy for the Public and Private Sector.

== ITF finals ==
=== Doubles: 12 (5–7) ===
Result	No.	Date	Tournament	Surface	Partner	Opponents	Score
Loss	1.	24 September 1984	Bol, Yugoslavia	Clay	(West Germany) Martina Reinhardt	(Czechoslovakia) Miluše Dosedělová (Socialist Federal Republic of Yugoslavia) Karmen Škulj	3–6, 4–6
Win	1.	15 October 1984	Haifa, Israel	Hard	(West Germany) Martina Reinhardt	(Sweden) Elizabeth Ekblom (Netherlands) Marianne van der Torre	6–2, 7–5
Loss	2.	20 May 1985	Bath, United Kingdom	Clay	(United Kingdom) Belinda Borneo	(South Africa) Elna Reinach (South Africa) Monica Reinach	3–6, 3–6
Win	2.	18 November 1985	Cheshire, United Kingdom	Carpet	(United Kingdom) Belinda Borneo	(Czechoslovakia) Regina Rajchrtová (Czechoslovakia) Jana Novotná	6–2, 6–3
Loss	3.	19 April 1986	Cumberland, United Kingdom	Hard	(South Africa) Monica Reinach	(United Kingdom) Jane Wood (United Kingdom) Belinda Borneo	4–6, 3–6
Win	3.	27 April 1986	Hatfield, United Kingdom	Hard	(South Africa) Monica Reinach	(Sweden) Catrin Jexell (Sweden) Helena Olsson	6–1, 5–7, 6–3
Loss	4.	7 November 1986	Queens, United Kingdom	Grass	(United Kingdom) Lorrayne Gracie	(United Kingdom) Sally Timms (United Kingdom) Katie Rickett	4–6, 3–6
Loss	5.	16 August 1987	Koksijde, Belgium	Clay	(Belgium) Kathleen Schuurmans	(Belgium) Sabine Appelmans (Belgium) Caroline van Renterghem	7–6^{(2)}, 2–6, 6–7^{(3)}
Loss	6.	9 November 1987	Eastbourne, United Kingdom	Carpet	(France) Pascale Etchemendy	(Soviet Union) Eugenia Maniokova (Soviet Union) Natalia Medvedeva	1–6, 1–6
Win	4.	23 April 1988	Queens, United Kingdom	Clay	(United Kingdom) Anne Simpkin	(Republic of Ireland) Lesley O'Halloran (Denmark) Lone Vandborg	4–6, 6–2, 7–6
Win	5.	8 May 1988	Bournemouth, United Kingdom	Clay	(United Kingdom) Anne Simpkin	(United Kingdom) Sally Godman (United Kingdom) Alexandra Niepel	6–3, 6–3
Loss	7.	15 May 1988	Bath, United Kingdom	Clay	(United Kingdom) Anne Simpkin	(United Kingdom) Sally Godman (United Kingdom) Alexandra Niepel	3–6, 2–6

== Personal life ==
Joy Tacon is sister of Christine Tacon CBE
