= Eva Melicharová =

Czech tennis player

- Country (sports): Czech Republic
- Born: 2 February 1970 (age 56)
- Turned pro: 1989
- Retired: 2001
- Prize money: $190,543

Singles
- Career record: 97–94
- Career titles: 0 WTA, 1 ITF
- Highest ranking: No. 234 (21 June 1993)

Doubles
- Career record: 205–129
- Career titles: 2 WTA, 24 ITF
- Highest ranking: No. 47 (26 January 1998)

Grand Slam doubles results
- Australian Open: 2R (1996, 1997)
- French Open: 3R (1991)
- Wimbledon: 1R (1991, 1994–99)
- US Open: 2R (1995)

Grand Slam mixed doubles results
- Australian Open: QF (1998)
- French Open: 1R (1998)
- Wimbledon: 1R (1997, 1998, 1999)

Eva Melicharová (born 2 February 1970) is a former Czech professional tennis player.

Melicharová has a career-high WTA singles ranking of 234, achieved on 21 June 1993. She also has a career-high WTA doubles ranking of 47, achieved on 26 January 1998. In her career, she won two WTA Tour doubles titles and one ITF singles title and 22 ITF doubles titles.

Melicharová retired from professional tennis in 2001.

== WTA Tour career finals ==
=== Doubles: 5 (2 titles, 3 runner-ups) ===
Legend
Grand Slam	0
Tier I	0
Tier II	0
Tier III	0
Tier IV & V	1

Titles by surface
Hard	0
Clay	1
Grass	1
Carpet	0

Result	W/L	Date	Tournament	Surface	Partner	Opponents	Score
Loss	0–1	May 1996	Budapest, Hungary	Clay	(Czech Republic) Radka Bobková	(United States) Katrina Adams (United States) Debbie Graham	3–6, 6–7^{(3–7)}
Loss	0–2	Feb 1997	Linz, Austria	Carpet (i)	(Czech Republic) Helena Vildová	(France) Alexandra Fusai (France) Nathalie Tauziat	6–4, 3–6, 1–6
Win	1–2	Jun 1997	Rosmalen, Netherlands	Grass	(Czech Republic) Helena Vildová	(Slovakia) Karina Habšudová (Argentina) Florencia Labat	6–3, 7–6^{(8–6)}
Win	2–2	Aug 1997	Maria Lankowitz, Austria	Clay	(Czech Republic) Helena Vildová	(Czech Republic) Radka Bobková (Germany) Wiltrud Probst	6–2, 6–2
Loss	2–3	Jun 1998	Rosmalen, Netherlands	Grass	(Romania) Cătălina Cristea	(Belgium) Sabine Appelmans (Netherlands) Miriam Oremans	7–6^{(7–4)}, 6–7^{(6–8)}, 6–7^{(5–7)}

== ITF finals ==
Legend
$100,000 tournaments
$75,000 tournaments
$50,000 tournaments
$25,000 tournaments
$10,000 tournaments

=== Singles (1–0) ===
Result	No.	Date	Tournament	Surface	Opponent	Score
Win	1.	25 February 1991	Valencia, Spain	Clay	(Spain) Cristina Torrens Valero	7–5, 6–2

=== Doubles (24–14) ===
Result	No.	Date	Tournament	Surface	Partner	Opponents	Score
Win	1.	24 April 1989	Dubrovnik, Yugoslavia	Clay	(Czechoslovakia) Ivana Jankovská	(Australia) Lily Nejasmic (Australia) Mary Nejasmic	1–0 ret.
Loss	2.	29 May 1989	Katowice, Poland	Clay	(Czechoslovakia) Ivana Jankovská	(Poland) Sylvia Czopek (Poland) Magdalena Feistel	3–6, 6–4, 1–6
Win	3.	7 August 1989	Paderborn, West Germany	Clay	(Czechoslovakia) Ivana Jankovská	(Soviet Union) Elena Brioukhovets (Soviet Union) Eugenia Maniokova	6–4, 6–2
Win	4.	14 August 1989	Rebecq, Belgium	Clay	(Czechoslovakia) Ivana Jankovská	(Israel) Medi Dadoch (Bulgaria) Svetlana Krivencheva	6–1, 6–3
Loss	5.	18 September 1989	Rabac, Yugoslavia	Clay	(Czechoslovakia) Ivana Jankovská	(Soviet Union) Agnese Blumberga (Czechoslovakia) Kateřina Šišková	1–6, 4–6
Win	6.	25 September 1989	Mali Lošinj, Yugoslavia	Clay	(Czechoslovakia) Ivana Jankovská	(Czechoslovakia) Karin Baleková (Czechoslovakia) Jitka Dubcová	6–2, 6–2
Win	7.	9 October 1989	Bol, Yugoslavia	Clay	(Czechoslovakia) Ivana Jankovská	(Czechoslovakia) Radka Bobková (Czechoslovakia) Petra Raclavská	6–3, 3–6, 6–2
Win	8.	16 October 1989	Supetar, Yugoslavia	Clay	(Czechoslovakia) Ivana Jankovská	(Soviet Union) Agnese Blumberga (Soviet Union) Svetlana Komleva	6–2, 6–3
Loss	9.	26 February 1990	Ashkelon, Israel	Hard	(Czechoslovakia) Ivana Jankovská	(South Africa) Michelle Anderson (South Africa) Robyn Field	3–6, 4–6
Loss	10.	5 March 1990	Haifa, Israel	Hard	(Czechoslovakia) Ivana Jankovská	(South Africa) Michelle Anderson (South Africa) Robyn Field	2–6, 2–6
Win	11.	16 April 1990	Naples, Italy	Clay	(Czechoslovakia) Ivana Jankovská	(Czechoslovakia) Michaela Frimmelová (Hungary) Réka Szikszay	6–3, 6–4
Win	12.	4 June 1990	Mantua, Italy	Clay	(Czechoslovakia) Ivana Jankovská	(Indonesia) Yayuk Basuki (Indonesia) Suzanna Wibowo	6–3, 7–5
Loss	13.	2 July 1990	Vaihingen, West Germany	Clay	(Czechoslovakia) Ivana Jankovská	(Australia) Kerry-Anne Guse (Australia) Danielle Jones	4–6, 7–6, 3–6
Loss	14.	20 May 1991	Katowice, Poland	Clay	(Czechoslovakia) Ivana Jankovská	(Poland) Magdalena Feistel (Czechoslovakia) Helena Vildová	4–6, 7–6, 0–6
Loss	15.	1 June 1992	Brindisi, Poland	Clay	(Czechoslovakia) Ivana Jankovská	(Italy) Nathalie Baudone (Italy) Cristina Salvi	6–4, 3–6, 2–6
Win	16.	13 July 1992	Sezze, Italy	Clay	(Czechoslovakia) Ivana Jankovská	(Australia) Justine Hodder (Australia) Kirrily Sharpe	7–6^{(1)}, 5–7, 7–5
Win	17.	10 May 1993	Putignano, Italy	Hard	(Czech Republic) Ivana Jankovská	(Italy) Susanna Attili (Italy) Elena Savoldi	6–3, 6–7^{(6)}, 6–4
Win	18.	19 July 1993	Sezze, Italy	Clay	(Czech Republic) Ivana Jankovská	(Argentina) Laura Montalvo (Argentina) Valentina Solari	6–2, 7–5
Loss	19.	6 September 1993	Klagenfurt, Austria	Clay	(Czech Republic) Ivana Jankovská	(Czech Republic) Květa Peschke (Czech Republic) Jana Pospíšilová	4–6, 6–7
Win	20.	20 September 1993	Capua, Italy	Clay	(Czech Republic) Ivana Jankovská	(Italy) Flora Perfetti (Italy) Francesca Romano	6–3, 3–6, 7–6
Win	21.	27 September 1993	Kirchheim, Austria	Clay	(Czech Republic) Ivana Jankovská	(Czech Republic) Petra Kučová (Czech Republic) Kateřina Šišková	6–1, 6–7, 6–1
Loss	22.	6 September 1993	Vítkovice, Czech Republic	Hard	(Czech Republic) Ivana Jankovská	(Czech Republic) Květa Peschke (Czech Republic) Dominika Gorecká	5–7, 6–2, 6–7
Win	23.	13 December 1993	Přerov, Czech Republic	Hard	(Czech Republic) Ivana Jankovská	(Hungary) Rita Kuti-Kis (Hungary) Petra Mandula	3–6, 7–5, 6–1
Loss	24.	31 January 1994	Coburg, Germany	Carpet	(Czech Republic) Ivana Jankovská	(Poland) Katharzyna Teodorowicz (Czech Republic) Helena Vildová	2–6, 6–7
Loss	25.	14 March 1994	Reims, France	Clay	(Czech Republic) Ivana Jankovská	(Netherlands) Gaby Coorengel (United Kingdom) Alison Smith	6–4, 6–7, 5–7
Winner	26.	15 May 1994	Budapest, Hungary	Clay	(Czech Republic) Helena Vildová	(Hungary) Virág Csurgó (Hungary) Andrea Temesvári	6–2, 6–4
Loss	27.	11 December 1994	Cergy-Pontoise, France	Hard (i)	(Czech Republic) Kateřina Šišková	(France) Angelique Olivier (Bulgaria) Elena Pampoulova	1–6, 4–6
Loss	28.	27 February 1995	Prostějov, Czech Republic	Hard (i)	(Poland) Katarzyna Teodorowicz	(Switzerland) Martina Hingis (Czech Republic) Petra Langrová	6–7^{(4)}, 2–6
Win	29.	24 April 1995	Budapest, Hungary	Clay	(Czech Republic) Helena Vildová	(France) Alexandra Fusai (Australia) Kristin Godridge	6–3, 6–4
Win	30.	15 May 1995	Tortosa, Spain	Clay	(Czech Republic) Lenka Němečková	(Spain) Estefania Bottini (Spain) Gala Leon Garcia	6–3, 7–6
Loss	31.	14 August 1995	Maribor, Slovenia	Clay	(Czech Republic) Helena Vildová	(Italy) Laura Garrone (Slovenia) Tina Križan	4–6, 6–3, 2–6
Win	32.	13 November 1995	Bad Gögging, Germany	Carpet (i)	(Czech Republic) Helena Vildová	(Czech Republic) Olga Blahotová (Czech Republic) Jana Macurová	7–5, 6–3
Win	33.	3 December 1995	Limoges, France	Hard	(Czech Republic) Helena Vildová	(Czech Republic) Eva Martincová (Bulgaria) Elena Pampoulova	6–3, 0–6, 6–4
Win	34.	9 December 1996	Přerov, Czech Republic	Carpet	(Czech Republic) Kateřina Šišková	(Czech Republic) Milena Nekvapilová (Czech Republic) Hana Šromová	6–2, 7–6^{(5)}
Win	35.	12 April 1998	Dubrovnik, Croatia	Clay	(Czech Republic) Helena Vildová	(Czech Republic) Blanka Kumbárová (Czech Republic) Michaela Paštiková	5–7, 6–4, 6–4
Win	36.	20 December 1998	Průhonice, Czech Republic	Carpet (i)	(Czech Republic) Helena Vildová	(Slovakia) Ľudmila Cervanová (Germany) Magdalena Kučerová	4–6, 6–3, 6–4
Win	37.	17 July 1999	Puchheim, Germany	Clay	(Bulgaria) Svetlana Krivencheva	(Germany) Kirstin Freye (Germany) Syna Schmidle	6–2, 6–4
Win	38.	1 August 1999	Les Contamines, France	Hard	(France) Caroline Dhenin	(Colombia) Giana Gutiérrez (Netherlands) Andrea van den Hurk	6–4, 6–2
