= Li Xinyi (tennis) =

Chinese tennis player

- Country (sports): China
- Born: 14 June 1962 (age 63)

Singles
- Highest ranking: No. 407 (25 April 1988)

Team competitions
- Fed Cup: 7–8
Medal record
Asian Games
Gold medal – first place	1986 Seoul	Women's singles
Gold medal – first place	1986 Seoul	Women's team

Li Xinyi (born 14 June 1962) is a Chinese former professional tennis player. She was a singles gold medalist at the 1986 Asian Games in Seoul.

Li was a regular member of China's Federation Cup team during the 1980s, featuring in a total of 13 ties, for four singles and three doubles wins. Her four wins in singles included victories over Brazil's Niege Dias and Etsuko Inoue of Japan. In 1986 she played a Federation Cup rubber against Martina Navratilova in Prague, which was the first time the adopted American had played in her birth country since defecting.

On the WTA Tour, Li played in the main draw of two tournaments, the 1987 Singapore Women's Open and 1988 Lipton International Players Championships in Florida. She reached a best singles ranking of 407 in the world.

== ITF finals ==
=== Singles: 2 (2–0) ===
Result	No.	Date	Tournament	Surface	Opponent	Score
Win	1.	22 October 1984	Saga, Japan	Hard	(Australia) Nerida Gregory	6–4, 6–3
Win	2.	21 October 1985	Saga, Japan	Hard	(Japan) Yukie Koizumi	6–2, 6–3

=== Doubles: 6 (2–4) ===
Result	No.	Date	Tournament	Surface	Partner	Opponents	Score
Loss	1.	12 November 1984	Kuroshio, Japan	Hard	(China) Zhong Ni	(United States) Jaime Kaplan (United States) Carol Watson	5–7, 3–6
Loss	2.	22 April 1985	Queens, United Kingdom	Hard	(China) Zhong Ni	(South Africa) Elna Reinach (South Africa) Monica Reinach	6–2, 2–6, 7–9
Win	1.	29 April 1985	Sutton, United Kingdom	Hard	(China) Zhong Ni	(United Kingdom) Lorrayne Gracie (West Germany) Martina Reinhardt	6–3, 6–3
Win	2.	6 May 1985	Bournemouth, United Kingdom	Hard	(China) Zhong Ni	(South Africa) Elna Reinach (South Africa) Monica Reinach	5–7, 7–5, 6–4
Loss	3.	21 October 1985	Saga, Japan	Hard	(China) Zhong Ni	(Netherlands) Nanette Schutte (Netherlands) Marianne Van Der Torre	2–6, 4–6
Loss	4.	30 June 1986	Brindisi, Italy	Clay	(China) Zhong Ni	(Indonesia) Suzanna Wibowo (Indonesia) Yayuk Basuki	4–6, 6–4, 2–6

== See also ==
- List of China Fed Cup team representatives
