= Robyn Field =

South African tennis player

- Full name: Robyn Field-Jones
- Country (sports): South Africa
- Born: 27 June 1966 (age 58)
- Prize money: $50,260

Singles
- Highest ranking: No. 199 (1 October 1990)

Grand Slam singles results
- Wimbledon: 1R (1990)

Doubles
- Highest ranking: No. 138 (20 October 1990)

Grand Slam doubles results
- French Open: 1R (1990)
- US Open: 1R (1990)

Grand Slam mixed doubles results
- French Open: 1R (1990)
- Wimbledon: 1R (1990)

Robyn Field-Jones (born 27 June 1966) is a former professional tennis player from South Africa. She lives in Durban.

Field played American collegiate tennis for the Texas Longhorns of the University of Texas during the 1980s.

From 1988 to 1991, Field competed on the professional tour. She qualified for the main draw of the 1990 Wimbledon Championships, with wins over Carling Bassett-Seguso, Yayuk Basuki and Renata Baranski, before falling in the first round to Tami Whitlinger. As a doubles player she also featured in the main draws of the French Open and US Open.

== ITF finals ==
$25,000 tournaments
$10,000 tournaments

=== Singles: 4 (1-3) ===
Result	W–L	Date	Tournament	Surface	Opponent	Score
Loss	0–1	12 June 1989	Algarve, Portugal	Hard	(Spain) Maite Martínez	6–3, 2–6, 1–6
Loss	0–2	6 November 1989	Ashkelon, Israel	Clay	(Netherlands) Miriam Oremans	4–6, 5–7
Loss	0–3	5 March 1990	Haifa, Israel	Hard	(Israel) Yael Segal	1–6, 1–6
Win	1–3	23 April 1990	Ramat HaSharon, Israel	Hard	(Israel) Ilana Berger	6–3, 3–6, 7–5

=== Doubles: 18 (12–6) ===
Result	W–L	Date	Tournament	Surface	Partner	Opponents	Score
Loss	1.	31 October 1988	Haifa, Israel	Hard	(Republic of Ireland) Lesley O'Halloran	(Israel) Ilana Berger (Israel) Hagit Ohayon	3–6, 1–6
Loss	2.	20 February 1989	Bloemfontein, South Africa	Hard	(South Africa) Gail Boon	(South Africa) Michelle Anderson (South Africa) Linda Barnard	6–2, 5–7, 3–6
Loss	3.	10 April 1989	Limoges, France	Clay	(Sweden) Eva Lena Olsson	(South Africa) Michelle Anderson (France) Emmanuelle Derly	5–7, 0–6
Win	4.	5 June 1989	Cascais, Portugal	Clay	(Republic of Ireland) Lesley O'Halloran	(United States) Holly Danforth (Netherlands) Ingelise Driehuis	6–2, 2–6, 6–4
Loss	5.	12 June 1989	Algarve, Portugal	Hard	(South Africa) Michelle Anderson	(Netherlands) Ingelise Driehuis (Brazil) Themis Zambrzycki	2–6, 6–4, 0–6
Win	6.	30 October 1989	Jerusalem, Israel	Clay	(South Africa) Michelle Anderson	(Czechoslovakia) Alice Noháčová (Republic of Ireland) Lesley O'Halloran	6–4, 6–1
Win	7.	6 November 1989	Haifa, Israel	Hard	(South Africa) Michelle Anderson	(Czechoslovakia) Alice Noháčová (Republic of Ireland) Lesley O'Halloran	6–3, 6–3
Loss	8.	13 November 1989	Ashkelon, Israel	Clay	(South Africa) Michelle Anderson	(Czechoslovakia) Alice Noháčová (Republic of Ireland) Lesley O'Halloran	6–7, 4–6
Win	9.	20 November 1989	Tel Aviv, Israel	Clay	(South Africa) Michelle Anderson	(Czechoslovakia) Alice Noháčová (Republic of Ireland) Lesley O'Halloran	6–3, 6–3
Win	10.	26 February 1990	Ashkelon, Israel	Hard	(South Africa) Michelle Anderson	(Czechoslovakia) Ivana Jankovská (Czechoslovakia) Eva Melicharová	6–3, 6–4
Win	11.	5 March 1990	Haifa, Israel	Hard	(South Africa) Michelle Anderson	(Czechoslovakia) Ivana Jankovská (Czechoslovakia) Eva Melicharová	6–2, 6–2
Win	12.	12 March 1990	Jaffa, Israel	Hard	(South Africa) Michelle Anderson	(Netherlands) Miriam Oremans (Netherlands) Nicolette Rooimans	7–5, 6–4
Win	13.	19 March 1990	Ramat Hasharon, Israel	Hard	(South Africa) Michelle Anderson	(Czechoslovakia) Petra Holubová (Czechoslovakia) Sylvia Štefková	6–3, 6–0
Win	14.	14 May 1990	Ramat Hasharon, Israel	Hard	(South Africa) Michelle Anderson	(Australia) Kerry-Anne Guse (United Kingdom) Julie Salmon	6–3, 6–2
Win	15.	23 July 1990	Evansville, United States	Hard	(United States) Lea Antonoplis	(United States) Debbie Graham (Philippines) Jean Lozano	3–6, 6–2, 6–3
Win	16.	5 August 1991	Ramat HaSharon, Israel	Hard	(Israel) Ilana Berger	(South Africa) Janine Humphreys (Namibia) Elizma Nortje	6–0, 6–1
Win	17.	12 August 1991	Ashkelon, Israel	Hard	(Israel) Ilana Berger	(United States) Kirsten Dreyer (South Africa) Tessa Price	w/o
Loss	18.	19 August 1991	Jerusalem, Israel	Hard	(Israel) Ilana Berger	(United Kingdom) Barbara Griffiths (United Kingdom) Jane Wood	3–6, 7–6, 1–6
