= Valda Lake =

British tennis player

- Full name: Valda Lake
- Country (sports): Great Britain
- Born: 11 October 1968 (age 56); Torquay, Devon, UK
- Height: 5 ft 8 in (1.73 m)
- Turned pro: 1983
- Retired: 1997
- Prize money: $169,985

Singles
- Career record: 82–111
- Career titles: 0 WTA (0 ITF)
- Highest ranking: 172 (11 April 1988)

Grand Slam singles results
- Australian Open: 1R (1988)
- Wimbledon: 2R (1989)

Doubles
- Career record: 156–186
- Career titles: 0 WTA (8 ITF)
- Highest ranking: 56 (20 June 1994)

Grand Slam doubles results
- Australian Open: 2R (1994)
- French Open: 1R (1994, 1995, 1996)
- Wimbledon: 3R (1993)
- US Open: 1R (1993, 1994, 1995)

Mixed doubles
- Career record: 2–5
- Career titles: 0

Grand Slam mixed doubles results
- Wimbledon: 2R (1994, 1995)

Valda Lake (born 11 October 1968) is a former tennis player from Great Britain who began playing professionally in 1983 and retired in 1997. Over the course of her career, she reached a career-high singles ranking of world number 172 in singles (achieved on 11 April 1988) and number 56 in doubles (achieved on 20 June 1994). During her career, Lake was more successful in doubles than she was in singles, winning eight ITF titles and reaching the final of the 1994 China Open. She represented Great Britain in the 1996 Summer Olympics held in Atlanta playing doubles with Clare Wood and reaching the quarter-finals before losing to the Gold Medalist American Team- Gigi Fernández and Mary Joe Fernández.

She currently lives in Los Angeles and owns an art gallery named "Wallspace" and is a set decorator in TV commercials.

== WTA tour and ITF circuit finals ==
=== Singles: 2 (1–1) ===
| Legend Grand Slam tournaments (0–0) WTA Tour Championships (0–0) WTA Tier I (0–0) WTA Tier II – IV (0–0) ITF Circuit (0–1) | Finals by surface Hard (0–1) Clay (0–0) Grass (0–0) Carpet (0–0) |

| Result | Date | Tournament | Surface | Opponent | Score |
|---|---|---|---|---|---|
| Loss | 10 May 1993 | $10,000 Basingston, Great Britain | Hard | (Sweden) Marianne Vallin | 2–6, 6–7^{(6–8)} |

=== Doubles: 18 (8–10) ===
| Legend Grand Slam tournaments (0–0) WTA Tour Championships (0–0) WTA Tier I (0–0) WTA Tier II – IV (0–1) ITF Circuit (8–9) | Finals by surface Hard (3–8) Clay (2–1) Grass (0–0) Carpet (3–1) |

| Result | Date | Tournament | Surface | Partner | Opponents | Score |
|---|---|---|---|---|---|---|
| Loss | 21 July 1986 | $5,000 Amersfoort, Netherlands | Clay | (United Kingdom) Kaye Hand | (Netherlands) Ingelise Driehuis (Netherlands) Simone Schilder | 1–6, 6–4, 0–6 |
| Win | 17 November 1986 | $10,000 Croydon, Great Britain | Carpet (i) | (United Kingdom) Clare Wood | (Netherlands) Digna Ketelaar (Netherlands) Simone Schilder | 7–6, 2–6, 7–5 |
| Loss | 1 December 1986 | $10,000 Vereeniging, South Africa | Hard | (United Kingdom) Katie Rickett | (United States) Mary Daily (West Germany) Cornelia Lechner | 4–6, 1–6 |
| Loss | 8 December 1986 | $10,000 Johannesburg, South Africa | Hard | (United Kingdom) Katie Rickett | (South Africa) Linda Barnard (South Africa) Mariaan de Swardt | 4–6, 6–7 |
| Loss | 15 December 1986 | $25,000 Johannesburg, South Africa | Hard | (United Kingdom) Katie Rickett | (South Africa) Elna Reinach (South Africa) Monica Reinach | 4–6, 2–6 |
| Loss | 20 April 1987 | $10,000 Queens, Great Britain | Hard | (Belgium) Ilse de Ruysscher | (United Kingdom) Jo Louis (France) Frédérique Martin | 1–6, 7–5, 4–6 |
| Win | 11 May 1987 | $10,000 Lee-on-Solent, Great Britain | Clay | (Argentina) Andrea Tiezzi | (Israel) Ilana Berger (Netherlands) Titia Wilmink | 6–3, 6–2 |
| Loss | 3 October 1988 | $25,000 Eastbourne, Great Britain | Hard (i) | (United Kingdom) Anne Simpkin | (Netherlands) Carin Bakkum (Netherlands) Simone Schilder | 4–6, 4–6 |
| Win | 18 September 1989 | $10,000 Bangkok, Thailand | Hard | (New Zealand) Claudine Toleafoa | (Hong Kong) Paulette Moreno (Denmark) Karin Ptaszek | 7–6, 1–6, 7–5 |
| Win | 18 February 1991 | $10,000 Croydon, Great Britain | Carpet (i) | (United Kingdom) Sara Gomer | (Netherlands) Claire Wegink (Netherlands) Dorien Wamelink | 6–3, 2–6, 7–5 |
| Loss | 25 February 1991 | $10,000 Norwich, Great Britain | Carpet (i) | (United Kingdom) Anne Simpkin | (Germany) Anke Marchl (Netherlands) Dorien Wamelink | 4–6, 6–2, 1–6 |
| Loss | 29 April 1991 | $10,000 Basingstoke, Great Britain | Hard | (United Kingdom) Virginia Humphreys-Davies | (United Kingdom) Caroline Billingham (Republic of Ireland) Lesley O'Halloran | 5–7, 6–3, 4–6 |
| Win | 16 September 1991 | $25,000 Sofia, Bulgaria | Clay | (Germany) Meike Babel | (Czechoslovakia) Ivana Havrlíková (Czechoslovakia) Kateřina Šišková | 7–5, 6–0 |
| Loss | 26 April 1993 | $10,000 Lee-on-Solent, Great Britain | Hard | (United Kingdom) Colette Hall | (Zimbabwe) Paula Iversen (United Kingdom) Michele Mair | 2–6, 4–6 |
| Win | 10 May 1993 | $10,000 Basingston, Great Britain | Hard | (Australia) Robyn Mawdsley | (Germany) Sabine Haas (South Africa) Liezel Horn | 3–6, 6–4, 6–1 |
| Loss | 14 February 1994 | $100,000 China Open, Beijing, China | Hard (i) | (Australia) Kerry-Anne Guse | (China) Chen Li-Ling (China) Fang Li | 0–6, 2–6 |
| Win | 26 February 1996 | $50,000 Southampton, Great Britain | Carpet (i) | (United Kingdom) Clare Wood | (Italy) Laura Golarsa (Slovenia) Tina Križan | 6–4, 4–6, 6–3 |
| Win | 4 March 1996 | $25,000 Rockford, United States | Hard | (United States) Elly Hakami | (Russia) Anna Kournikova (San Marino) Ludmila Varmužová | 6–2, 6–3 |
