= Anke Marchl =

German tennis player

Anke Marchl (born 28 May 1967) is a German former professional tennis player.

On 27 April 1992, Marchl reached her best singles ranking of world No. 409. On 21 October 1991, she peaked at No. 183 in the doubles rankings. Her only WTA Tour main-draw appearance came at the 1991 Milan Ladies Open, where she partnered with Lubomira Bacheva in the doubles event.

== ITF Circuit finals ==
=== Singles (0–1) ===
Result	No.	Date	Tournament	Surface	Opponent	Score
Loss	1.	6 May 1991	Lee-on-the-Solent, United Kingdom	Clay	(West Germany) Christina Singer	7–5, 4–6, 3–6

=== Doubles (4–1) ===
Result	No.	Date	Tournament	Surface	Partner	Opponents	Score
Win	1.	22 October 1990	Neumünster, West Germany	Clay	(West Germany) Christina Singer	(Sweden) Åsa Carlsson (Sweden) Marie Linusson	6–2, 7–5
Win	2.	3 February 1991	Danderyd, Sweden	Carpet (i)	(Netherlands) Dorien Wamelink	(Denmark) Merete Balling-Stockmann (Switzerland) Natalie Tschan	6–4, 6–4
Win	3.	3 March 1991	Norwich, United Kingdom	Carpet (i)	(Netherlands) Dorien Wamelink	(United Kingdom) Anne Simpkin (United Kingdom) Valda Lake	6–4, 2–6, 6–1
Win	4.	6 May 1991	Lee-on-the-Solent, United Kingdom	Clay	(West Germany) Christina Singer	(Australia) Catherine Barclay (Australia) Robyn Mawdsley	4–6, 7–6^{(3)}, 6–1
Loss	1.	9 August 1992	Paderborn, Germany	Clay	(Germany) Nadja Beik	(Moldova) Svetlana Komleva (Ukraine) Irina Sukhova	6–2, 4–6, 2–6
