= Lesley O'Halloran =

Irish tennis player

- Full name: Lesley O'Halloran
- Country (sports): Ireland
- Born: 1 November 1965 (age 59)
- Plays: Left-handed
- Prize money: US$ 15,864

Singles
- Highest ranking: No. 402 (11 April 1988)

Doubles
- Highest ranking: No. 113 (5 March 1990)

Grand Slam doubles results
- Wimbledon: 2R (1989)

Lesley O'Halloran (born 1 November 1965) is a former professional tennis player from Ireland. Lesley is one of the most decorated Irish tennis players of all time. An accomplished coach, she has more than two decades experience helping players with their game and their fitness.

== Biography ==
A left-handed player from Dublin, O'Halloran played college tennis in the United States before turning professional.

From 1986 to 1998 she featured in 32 Fed Cup ties for Ireland, winning 20 matches, 5 in singles and 15 in doubles.

On the international circuit she was most successful in doubles, with a best ranking of 113 in the world. Her best performance on the WTA Tour was a quarter-final appearance in the doubles at the 1989 Virginia Slims of Houston. She made it into the women's doubles main draw at the 1989 Wimbledon Championships, as a lucky loser from qualifying, with American partner Leigh-Anne Eldredge. The pair reached the second round.

O'Halloran currently holds the position of Director of Rackets in Fitzwilliam Lawn Tennis Club in Dublin. She has competed on the ITF senior circuit and finished 2012 as the world's top ranked player in both singles and doubles for the 45's.

== ITF finals ==
=== Doubles (4-8) ===
Result	No.	Date	Tournament	Surface	Partner	Opponents	Score
Loss	1.	24 January 1988	Denain, France	Clay	(United States) Liz Burris	(France) Virginie Paquet (France) Karine Quentrec	3–6, 1–6
Loss	2.	14 March 1988	Ashkelon, Israel	Hard	(United States) Heidi Rosenbaum	(Finland) Anne Aallonen (Sweden) Lena Sandin	4–6, 2–6
Loss	3.	23 April 1988	Queens, United Kingdom	Clay	(Denmark) Lone Vandborg	(United Kingdom) Anne Simpkin (United Kingdom) Joy Tacon	6–4, 2–6, 6–7
Loss	4.	18 September 1988	Caracas, Venezuela	Hard	(Switzerland) Andrea Martinelli	(Denmark) Henriette Kjær Nielsen (Denmark) Anja Michailoff	1–6, 6–2, 1–6
Win	1.	9 October 1988	Lima, Peru	Clay	(Cuba) Iluminada Concepción	(Peru) Carla Rodríguez (Peru) Lorena Rodríguez	6–3, 6–2
Loss	5.	31 October 1988	Haifa, Israel	Hard	(South Africa) Robyn Field	(Israel) Ilana Berger (Israel) Hagit Ohayon	3–6, 1–6
Win	2.	5 June 1989	Cascais, Portugal	Clay	(South Africa) Robyn Field	(United States) Holly Danforth (Netherlands) Ingelise Driehuis	6–2, 2–6, 6–4
Loss	6.	30 October 1989	Jerusalem, Israel	Clay	(Czechoslovakia) Alice Noháčová	(South Africa) Michelle Anderson (South Africa) Robyn Field	4–6, 1–6
Loss	7.	6 November 1989	Haifa, Israel	Hard	(Czechoslovakia) Alice Noháčová	(South Africa) Michelle Anderson (South Africa) Robyn Field	3–6, 3–6
Win	3.	13 November 1989	Ashkelon, Israel	Clay	(Czechoslovakia) Alice Noháčová	(South Africa) Michelle Anderson (South Africa) Robyn Field	7–6, 6–4
Loss	8.	20 November 1989	Tel Aviv, Israel	Clay	(Czechoslovakia) Alice Noháčová	(South Africa) Michelle Anderson (South Africa) Robyn Field	3–6, 3–6
Win	4.	29 April 1991	Basingstoke, United Kingdom	Hard	(United Kingdom) Caroline Billingham	(United Kingdom) Virginia Humphreys-Davies (United Kingdom) Valda Lake	7–5, 3–6, 6–4
