= Zhong Ni =

Chinese tennis player

- Country (sports): China
- Born: 20 May 1962 (age 63)

Singles
- Career record: 6–9

Doubles
- Career record: 27–7
- Career titles: 3 ITF

Zhong Ni (born 20 May 1962) is a Chinese former professional tennis player who competed during the 1980s.

Zhong was a member of the China Federation Cup team between 1984 and 1987, appearing in a total of 11 ties. She amassed five wins in singles rubbers and won once in doubles.

At the 1986 Asian Games in Seoul, Zhong won a gold medal in the team competition and was a silver medalist for China in the mixed doubles.

== ITF finals ==
=== Singles: 1 (0–1) ===
Result	Date	Tournament	Surface	Opponent	Score
Loss	20 May 1985	Bath, United Kingdom	Clay	(South Africa) Elna Reinach	3–6, 4–6

=== Doubles: 9 (3–6) ===
Result	No.	Date	Tournament	Surface	Partner	Opponents	Score
Loss	1.	12 November 1984	Kuroshio, Japan	Hard	(China) Li Xinyi	(United States) Jaime Kaplan (United States) Carol Watson	5–7, 3–6
Loss	2.	22 April 1985	Queens, United Kingdom	Hard	(China) Li Xinyi	(South Africa) Elna Reinach (South Africa) Monica Reinach	6–2, 2–6, 7–9
Win	1.	29 April 1985	Sutton, United Kingdom	Hard	(China) Li Xinyi	(United Kingdom) Lorrayne Gracie (West Germany) Martina Reinhardt	6–3, 6–3
Win	2.	6 May 1985	Bournemouth, United Kingdom	Hard	(China) Li Xinyi	(South Africa) Elna Reinach (South Africa) Monica Reinach	5–7, 7–5, 6–4
Loss	3.	21 October 1985	Saga, Japan	Hard	(China) Li Xinyi	(Netherlands) Nanette Schutte (Netherlands) Marianne Van Der Torre	2–6, 4–6
Win	3.	4 November 1985	Ibaraki, Japan	Hard	(Japan) Ei Iida	(Netherlands) Nanette Schutte (Netherlands) Marianne van der Torre	7–5, 6–3
Loss	4.	11 November 1985	Matsuyama, Japan	Hard	(Japan) Ei Iida	(Netherlands) Nanette Schutte (Netherlands) Marianne van der Torre	2–6, 1–6
Loss	5.	25 November 1985	Kyoto, Japan	Hard	(Japan) Ei Iida	(Netherlands) Nanette Schutte (Netherlands) Marianne van der Torre	4–6, 2–6
Loss	6.	30 June 1986	Brindisi, Italy	Clay	(China) Li Xinyi	(Indonesia) Suzanna Wibowo (Indonesia) Yayuk Basuki	4–6, 6–4, 2–6

== See also ==
- List of China Fed Cup team representatives
