= Anne Simpkin =

British tennis player (born 1969)

- Full name: Anne Simpkin Meredith
- Country (sports): United Kingdom
- Born: 2 April 1969 (age 56)
- Plays: Right-handed
- Prize money: $45,000

Singles
- Highest ranking: No. 200 (17 July 1989)

Grand Slam singles results
- Wimbledon: 1R (1988, 1989, 1990)

Doubles
- Highest ranking: No. 164 (14 August 1989)

Grand Slam doubles results
- Australian Open: 1R (1989, 1990)
- Wimbledon: 1R (1988, 1990)

Grand Slam mixed doubles results
- Wimbledon: 1R (1990)

Anne Simpkin Meredith (born 2 April 1969) is a British former professional tennis player.

A right-handed player from Leicestershire, Simpkin reached a career best ranking of 200 in the world while competing on the professional tour.

Simpkin featured as a wildcard in the singles main draw at Wimbledon on three occasions. Her best performance on the WTA Tour came at Eastbourne in 1989, where she had a first round win over Julie Salmon, before losing in the second round to Mary Joe Fernandez. She won one singles and three doubles titles on the ITF circuit.

== ITF finals ==
Legend
$25,000 tournaments
$10,000 tournaments

=== Singles: 2 (1–1) ===
Result	No.	Date	Tournament	Surface	Opponent	Score
Win	1.	23 April 1988	Queens, United Kingdom	Clay	(United States) Ann Grossman	6–4, 7–5
Loss	1.	29 August 1988	Corsica, France	Clay	(France) Maïder Laval	2–6, 3–6

=== Doubles: 7 (3–4) ===
Result	No.	Date	Tournament	Surface	Partner	Opponents	Score
Loss	1.	11 January 1988	Moulins, France	Clay	(United Kingdom) Caroline Billingham	(France) Karine Quentrec (France) Nathalie Herreman	3–6, 3–6
Win	1.	29 February 1988	Rocafort, Spain	Clay	(Austria) Bettina Diesner	(Spain) Elena Guerra (Spain) Rosa Bielsa	6–3, 6–2
Win	2.	23 April 1988	Queens, United Kingdom	Clay	(United Kingdom) Joy Tacon	(Republic of Ireland) Lesley O'Halloran (Denmark) Lone Vandborg	4–6, 6–2, 7–6
Win	3.	8 May 1988	Bournemouth, United Kingdom	Clay	(United Kingdom) Joy Tacon	(United Kingdom) Sally Godman (United Kingdom) Alexandra Niepel	6–3, 6–3
Loss	2.	15 May 1988	Bath, United Kingdom	Clay	(United Kingdom) Joy Tacon	(United Kingdom) Sally Godman (United Kingdom) Alexandra Niepel	3–6, 2–6
Loss	3.	3 October 1988	Eastbourne, Great Britain	Hard	(United Kingdom) Valda Lake	(Netherlands) Carin Bakkum (Netherlands) Simone Schilder	4–6, 4–6
Loss	4.	25 February 1991	Norwich, United Kingdom	Carpet	(United Kingdom) Valda Lake	(Germany) Anke Marchl (Netherlands) Dorien Wamelink	4–6, 6–2, 1–6
