= Alexandra Niepel =

British tennis player

- Country (sports): United Kingdom
- Born: 24 August 1970 (age 55)

Singles
- Highest ranking: No. 431 (3 July 1989)

Grand Slam singles results
- Australian Open: Q1 (1988)

Doubles
- Career titles: 3 ITF
- Highest ranking: No. 217 (30 January 1989)

Grand Slam doubles results
- Wimbledon: 1R (1988)

Alexandra Niepel (born 24 August 1970) is a British former professional tennis player.

Niepel competed on the professional tour from 1987 to 1990.

At the 1988 Wimbledon Championships, she and Sally Godman received a wildcard to play in the women's doubles main draw, where they lost their first round match to the eighth seeds Katrina Adams and Zina Garrison.

Following her touring career she played college tennis in the United States for Mississippi State University.

== ITF finals ==
=== Singles: 1 (0–1) ===
Result	No.	Date	Tournament	Surface	Opponent	Score
Loss	1.	6 November 1988	Meknes, Morocco	Clay	(France) Agnès Romand	2–6, 2–6

=== Doubles: 10 (3–7) ===
Result	No.	Date	Tournament	Surface	Partner	Opponents	Score
Loss	1.	8 May 1988	Bournemouth, United Kingdom	Clay	(United Kingdom) Sally Godman	(United Kingdom) Anne Simpkin (United Kingdom) Joy Tacon	3–6, 3–6
Win	1.	15 May 1988	Bath, United Kingdom	Clay	(United Kingdom) Sally Godman	(United Kingdom) Anne Simpkin (United Kingdom) Joy Tacon	6–3, 6–2
Loss	2.	17 October 1988	Azores, Portugal	Hard	(United Kingdom) Caroline Billingham	(Sweden) Helena Dahlström (Finland) Anne Aallonen	3–6, 3–6
Loss	3.	6 November 1988	Meknes, Morocco	Clay	(United Kingdom) Kaye Hand	(Monaco) Agnès Barthélémy (France) Agnès Romand	Unknown
Loss	4.	13 November 1988	Fes, Morocco	Clay	(United Kingdom) Sally Timms	(Monaco) Agnès Barthélémy (France) Agnès Romand	7–6, 2–6, 0–1
Loss	5.	12 February 1989	Bergen, Norway	Hard	(United Kingdom) Belinda Borneo	(Sweden) Helen Jonsson (Sweden) Malin Nilsson	3–6, 1–6
Win	2.	8 May 1989	Lee-on-Solent, England	Clay	(United Kingdom) Jo Louis	(Netherlands) Amy van Buuren (United Kingdom) Belinda Borneo	6–3, 6–2
Win	3.	19 June 1989	Madeira, Portugal	Hard	(Netherlands) Ingelise Driehuis	(Czechoslovakia) Petra Holubová (Czechoslovakia) Alice Noháčová	6–3, 6–1
Loss	6.	27 November 1989	Budapest, Hungary	Carpet	(West Germany) Caroline Schneider	(Soviet Union) Agnese Blumberga (West Germany) Tanja Hauschildt	3–6, 6–1, 1–6
Loss	7.	21 January 1990	Jakarta, Indonesia	Hard	(United Kingdom) Caroline Billingham	(Indonesia) Yayuk Basuki (Indonesia) Suzanna Wibowo	w/o
