= Katie Rickett =

British tennis player

- Full name: Katie Rickett Shaw
- Country (sports): United Kingdom
- Born: 19 August 1968 (age 56)
- Plays: Right-handed
- Prize money: $19,945

Singles
- Highest ranking: No. 291 (1 August 1988)

Grand Slam singles results
- Australian Open: 1R (1988)
- Wimbledon: Q1 (1987, 1989, 1990)

Doubles
- Career titles: 1 ITF
- Highest ranking: No. 190 (21 December 1986)

Grand Slam doubles results
- Australian Open: 1R (1988)
- Wimbledon: Q2 (1986)

Katie Rickett Shaw (born 19 August 1968) is a former professional tennis player from England.

A right-handed player from Birmingham, Rickett reached a career-high ranking of 291 in the world.

Rickett qualified as a lucky loser for the main draw of the 1988 Australian Open and was beaten in the first round by Marie-Christine Damas.

== ITF finals ==
=== Singles (0–1) ===
Result	No.	Date	Tournament	Surface	Opponent	Score
Loss	1.	25 April 1987	Queens, United Kingdom	Hard	(West Germany) Silke Frankl	3–6, 5–7

=== Doubles (1–4) ===
Result	No.	Date	Tournament	Surface	Partner	Opponents	Score
Win	1.	7 November 1986	Queens, UK	Grass	(United Kingdom) Sally Timms	(United Kingdom) Lorrayne Gracie (United Kingdom) Joy Tacon	6–4, 6–3
Loss	1.	6 December 1986	Vereeniging, South Africa	Hard	(United Kingdom) Valda Lake	(United States) Mary Dailey (West Germany) Cornelia Lechner	4–6, 1–6
Loss	2.	13 December 1986	Johannesburg, South Africa	Hard	(United Kingdom) Valda Lake	(South Africa) Linda Barnard (South Africa) Mariaan de Swardt	4–6, 6–7
Loss	3.	22 December 1986	Johannesburg, South Africa	Hard	(United Kingdom) Valda Lake	(South Africa) Elna Reinach (South Africa) Monica Reinach	4–6, 2–6
Loss	4.	21 July 1991	Frinton, UK	Grass	(United Kingdom) Alison Smith	(United Kingdom) Caroline Billingham (United Kingdom) Virginia Humphreys-Davies	3–6, 1–6
