= Merete Balling-Stockmann =

Danish tennis player

- Country (sports): Denmark
- Born: 10 December 1970 (age 55)

Singles
- Career record: 15–31
- Highest ranking: No. 440 (11 March 1991)

Doubles
- Career record: 33–28
- Career titles: 4 ITF
- Highest ranking: No. 273 (23 September 1991)

Merete Balling-Stockmann (born 10 December 1970) is a Danish former professional tennis player.

Balling-Stockmann is the daughter of tennis player Pia Balling, who was a five-time Danish national singles champion in the 1960s.

A Danish national title winner herself in 1990, Balling-Stockmann competed briefly on the professional tennis tour and won four ITF doubles tournaments. In 1990 she also represented the Denmark Federation Cup team in a tie against Luxembourg in Atlanta, where she and Sofie Albinus lost a dead rubber doubles match to Marie-Christine Goy and Karin Kschwendt.

In the early 1990s she played college tennis for Pepperdine University.

== ITF finals ==
=== Doubles (4–3) ===
| Result | No. | Date | Tournament | Surface | Partner | Opponents | Score |
|---|---|---|---|---|---|---|---|
| Win | 1. | 5 November 1989 | Meknes, Morocco | Clay | (Denmark) Pernilla Sorensen | (Socialist Federal Republic of Yugoslavia) Maja Palaveršić (Socialist Federal Republic of Yugoslavia) Nadin Ercegović | 6–1, 2–6, 6–4 |
| Win | 2. | 19 February 1990 | Hørsholm, Denmark | Carpet | (Denmark) Pernilla Sorensen | (Netherlands) Amy van Buuren (Netherlands) Gaby Coorengel | 6–4, 4–6, 7–5 |
| Loss | 1. | 27 January 1991 | Bergen, Norway | Carpet | (Switzerland) Natalie Tschan | (Poland) Magdalena Feistel (Norway) Amy Jönsson Raaholt | 2–6, 2–6 |
| Loss | 2. | 3 February 1991 | Danderyd, Sweden | Carpet | (Switzerland) Natalie Tschan | (Germany) Anke Marchl (Netherlands) Dorien Wamelink | 4–6, 4–6 |
| Win | 3. | 17 February 1991 | Lisbon, Portugal | Clay | (Denmark) Sofie Albinus | (Czechoslovakia) Klára Bláhová (Czechoslovakia) Monika Kratochvílová | 6–4, 6–4 |
| Win | 4. | 24 March 1991 | Bol, Yugoslavia | Clay | (Denmark) Sofie Albinus | (Socialist Federal Republic of Yugoslavia) Ivona Horvat (Czechoslovakia) Eva Martincová | 6–2, 6–3 |
| Loss | 3. | 28 April 1991 | Bracknell, United Kingdom | Hard | (United States) Lynn Nabors | (United Kingdom) Barbara Griffiths (Namibia) Elizma Nortje | 3–6, 2–6 |
