= Belinda Borneo =

British tennis player

- Country (sports): United Kingdom
- Born: 10 November 1966 (age 59)
- Plays: Right-handed
- Prize money: $72,311

Singles
- Career record: 60–92
- Career titles: 0
- Highest ranking: No. 238 (17 September 1990)

Grand Slam singles results
- Australian Open: Q1 (1991, 1992)
- Wimbledon: 1R (1986, 1990, 1991)

Doubles
- Career record: 97–73
- Career titles: 1 WTA / 6 ITF
- Highest ranking: No. 84 (18 November 1991)

Grand Slam doubles results
- Australian Open: 2R (1991, 1992)
- Wimbledon: 2R (1985, 1989, 1991)
- US Open: 1R (1991)

Belinda Borneo (born 10 November 1966) is a British former professional tennis player.

== Tennis career ==
A right-handed player, Borneo reached a career best singles ranking of 238 in the world. She featured in the singles main draw at Wimbledon on three occasions, without making it past the first round. At the 1990 Wimbledon Championships, she held match points in her loss to Carrie Cunningham.

Borneo was ranked as high as 84 in doubles and won one WTA Tour title, the 1992 Wellington Classic.

== WTA Tour finals ==
=== Doubles (1–1) ===
Result	W/L	Date	Tournament	Surface	Partner	Opponents	Score
Loss	0–1	Feb 1991	Wellington, New Zealand	Hard	(United Kingdom) Clare Wood	(Australia) Jo-Anne Faull (New Zealand) Julie Richardson	6–2, 5–7, 6–7^{(4–7)}
Win	1–1	Feb 1992	Wellington, New Zealand	Hard	(United Kingdom) Clare Wood	(Australia) Jo-Anne Faull (New Zealand) Julie Richardson	6–0, 7–6^{(7–5)}

== ITF finals ==
Legend
$25,000 tournaments
$10,000 tournaments

=== Doubles: 16 (6–10) ===
Result	No.	Date	Tournament	Surface	Partner	Opponents	Score
Loss	1.	20 May 1985	Bath, United Kingdom	Clay	(United Kingdom) Joy Tacon	(South Africa) Elna Reinach (South Africa) Monica Reinach	3–6, 3–6
Loss	2.	5 August 1985	Rheda, West Germany	Clay	(United Kingdom) Lorrayne Gracie	(West Germany) Silke Meier (West Germany) Claudia Porwik	6–4, 6–7, 1–6
Win	1.	18 November 1985	Cheshire, United Kingdom	Carpet	(United Kingdom) Joy Tacon	(Czechoslovakia) Regina Rajchrtová (Czechoslovakia) Jana Novotná	6–2, 6–3
Loss	3.	25 November 1985	Telford, United Kingdom	Hard	(Netherlands) Nicole Muns-Jagerman	(United States) Cathy Maso (United States) Susan Pendo	6–4, 3–6, 2–6
Loss	4.	31 March 1986	Bari, Italy	Clay	(West Germany) Wiltrud Probst	(Netherlands) Nanette Schutte (Netherlands) Marianne van der Torre	6–4, 6–7, 3–6
Win	2.	19 April 1986	Cumberland, United Kingdom	Hard	(United Kingdom) Jane Wood	(South Africa) Monica Reinach (United Kingdom) Joy Tacon	6–4, 6–3
Win	3.	27 April 1987	Sutton, United Kingdom	Hard	(South Africa) Linda Barnard	(Netherlands) Titia Wilmink (Denmark) Lone Vandborg	2–6, 7–5, 7–6
Loss	5.	10 October 1988	Telford, United Kingdom	Hard	(United Kingdom) Sarah Sullivan	(Netherlands) Carin Bakkum (Netherlands) Simone Schilder	5–7, 4–6
Win	4.	29 January 1989	Helsinki, Finland	Hard	(Denmark) Lone Vandborg	(West Germany) Sylvia Freye (United States) Anne-Marie Walson	6–2, 6–7^{(6)}, 6–2
Win	5.	5 February 1989	Stockholm, Sweden	Hard	(Denmark) Lone Vandborg	(West Germany) Vera-Carina Elter (West Germany) Ingrid Peltzer	6–1, 6–1
Loss	6.	12 February 1989	Bergen, Norway	Hard	(United Kingdom) Alexandra Niepel	(Sweden) Helen Jonsson (Sweden) Malin Nilsson	3–6, 1–6
Loss	7.	20 March 1989	Marsa, Malta	Hard	(Netherlands) Amy van Buuren	(Netherlands) Pascale Druyts (Italy) Caterina Nozzoli	3–6, 6–3, 3–6
Loss	8.	8 May 1989	Lee-on-Solent, England	Clay	(Netherlands) Amy van Buuren	(United Kingdom) Jo Louis (United Kingdom) Alexandra Niepel	3–6, 2–6
Loss	9.	15 May 1989	Queens, England	Clay	(Netherlands) Amy van Buuren	(Japan) Kimiko Date (Japan) Shiho Okada	6–7^{(2)}, 3–6
Win	6.	3 September 1990	Arzachena, Italy	Hard	(United Kingdom) Julie Salmon	(France) Emmanuelle Derly (Australia) Louise Pleming	6–1, 4–6, 6–3
Loss	10.	5 August 1991	Vigo, Spain	Clay	(Finland) Anne Aallonen	(Spain) Eva Bes (Spain) Virginia Ruano Pascual	6–7^{(6)}, 5–7
