= Dorien Wamelink =

Dutch tennis player

- Country (sports): Netherlands
- Born: 24 December 1970 (age 54)
- Retired: 1996
- Plays: Right-handed
- Prize money: US$ 15,262

Singles
- Career titles: 2 ITF
- Highest ranking: No. 252 (15 July 1991)

Doubles
- Career titles: 3 ITF
- Highest ranking: No. 253 (15 July 1991)

Dorien Wamelink (born 24 December 1970) is a Dutch former professional tennis player.

She has career-high WTA rankings of 252 in singles, achieved on 15 July 1991, and 253 in doubles, reached on 15 July 1991. Her only WTA Tour main-draw appearance came at the 1991 Pilkington Glass Championships Wamelink, where she came through qualifying to make the main draw where she was defeated by Puerto Rican Gigi Fernández in the first round, in straight sets.

== ITF finals ==
=== Singles (2–0) ===
Result	Date	Tournament	Surface	Opponent	Score
Win	10 February 1991	Helsinki, Finland	Carpet (i)	(Sweden) Marianne Vallin	7–5, 7–6^{(3)}
Win	3 March 1991	Norwich, United Kingdom	Carpet (i)	(United Kingdom) Sarah Bentley	6–3, 6–3

=== Doubles (3–1) ===
Result	Date	Tournament	Surface	Partner	Opponents	Score
Win	3 February 1991	Danderyd, Sweden	Carpet (i)	(Germany) Anke Marchl	(Denmark) Merete Balling-Stockmann (Switzerland) Natalie Tschan	6–4, 6–4
Loss	18 February 1991	Croydon, United Kingdom	Carpet (i)	(Netherlands) Claire Wegink	(United Kingdom) Sara Gomer (United Kingdom) Valda Lake	3–6, 6–2, 5–7
Win	3 March 1991	Norwich, United Kingdom	Carpet (i)	(Germany) Anke Marchl	(United Kingdom) Anne Simpkin (United Kingdom) Valda Lake	6–4, 2–6, 6–1
Win	19 January 1992	Bamberg, Germany	Carpet (i)	(Russia) Elena Likhovtseva	(Ukraine) Olga Lugina (Czech Republic) Markéta Štusková	4–6, 6–1, 6–2
