= Linda Barnard =

South African tennis player

- Country (sports): South Africa
- Born: 10 August 1968 (age 56)
- Prize money: $64,704

Singles
- Highest ranking: No. 191 (1 February 1988)

Doubles
- Highest ranking: No. 78 (23 July 1990)

Grand Slam doubles results
- French Open: 1R (1989, 1990)
- Wimbledon: 3R (1990)
- US Open: 3R (1989)

Linda Barnard (born 10 August 1968) is a South African former professional tennis player.

Barnard had a best singles ranking of 191 in the world and claimed three ITF titles, two of which came by beating Amanda Coetzer in the final. It was as a doubles player that she was most successful, with a career high ranking of 78. She made the third round of the women's doubles at both the 1989 US Open and 1990 Wimbledon Championships.

== ITF finals ==
$25,000 tournaments
$5–10,000 tournaments

=== Singles: 5 (3–2) ===
Result	No.	Date	Tournament	Surface	Opponent	Score
Win	1.	14 December 1987	Port Elizabeth, South Africa	Hard	(South Africa) Amanda Coetzer	4–6, 6–1, 6–1
Win	2.	4 January 1988	Johannesburg, South Africa	Hard	(Belgium) Ilse de Ruysscher	6–4, 6–3
Loss	1.	11 January 1988	Vereeniging, South Africa	Hard	(South Africa) Mariaan de Swardt	2–6, 6–3, 4–6
Loss	2.	19 December 1988	George, South Africa	Hard	(South Africa) Gail Boon	2–6, 6–3, 4–6
Win	3.	20 February 1989	Bloemfontein, South Africa	Hard	(South Africa) Amanda Coetzer	6–4, 6–1

=== Doubles: 12 (8–4) ===
Result	No.	Date	Tournament	Surface	Partner	Opponents	Score
Win	1.	8 December 1986	Johannesburg, South Africa	Hard	(South Africa) Mariaan de Swardt	(United Kingdom) Valda Lake (United Kingdom) Katie Rickett	6–4, 7–6
Win	2.	27 April 1987	Sutton, United Kingdom	Hard	(United Kingdom) Belinda Borneo	(Netherlands) Titia Wilmink (Denmark) Lone Vandborg	2–6, 7–5, 7–6
Win	3.	14 December 1987	Port Elizabeth, South Africa	Hard	(South Africa) Mariaan de Swardt	(South Africa) Ralene Fourie (South Africa) Benita Haycock	6–4, 6–2
Win	4.	4 January 1988	Johannesburg, South Africa	Hard	(South Africa) Mariaan de Swardt	(United States) Anne Grousbeck (United States) Vincenza Procacci	7–5, 6–2
Win	5.	11 January 1988	Vereeniging, South Africa	Hard	(South Africa) Mariaan de Swardt	(West Germany) Cora Linneman (United States) Margaret Redfearn	6–2, 7–5
Loss	1.	18 January 1988	Pretoria, South Africa	Hard	(South Africa) Mariaan de Swardt	(South Africa) Elna Reinach (South Africa) Dianne Van Rensburg	6–3, 4–6, 4–6
Win	6.	4 July 1988	Vaihingen, West Germany	Clay	(South Africa) Amanda Coetzer	(Japan) Ei Iida (Japan) Maya Kidowaki	3–6, 6–3, 6–4
Win	7.	11 July 1988	Erlangen, West Germany	Clay	(South Africa) Amanda Coetzer	(Australia) Tracey Morton (Australia) Lisa Weerasekera	6–2, 6–0
Win	8.	20 February 1989	Bloemfontein, South Africa	Hard	(South Africa) Michelle Anderson	(South Africa) Gail Boon (South Africa) Robyn Field	2–6, 7–5, 6–3
Loss	2.	27 February 1989	Pretoria, South Africa	Hard	(South Africa) Michelle Anderson	(South Africa) Rene Mentz (South Africa) Monica Reinach	1–6, 6–2, 4–6
Loss	3.	13 November 1989	Telford, United Kingdom	Hard	(South Africa) Lise Gregory	(Finland) Anne Aallonen (Netherlands) Simone Schilder	3–6, 6–7
Loss	4.	26 February 1990	Key Biscayne, United States	Hard	(Poland) Renata Baranski	(United States) Jennifer Fuchs (Sweden) Maria Strandlund	4–6, 4–6
