= Jaime Kaplan =

American tennis player

- Country (sports): United States
- Born: October 1, 1961 (age 64)
- Prize money: $47,256

Singles
- Career record: 5–30
- Highest ranking: No. 308 (March 14, 1988)

Doubles
- Career record: 37–70
- Highest ranking: No. 91 (July 20, 1987)

Grand Slam doubles results
- Australian Open: 1R (1988)
- French Open: 1R (1985, 1986, 1987, 1988)
- Wimbledon: 2R (1985, 1986)
- US Open: 2R (1987)

Grand Slam mixed doubles results
- French Open: 2R (1987, 1988)
- Wimbledon: 3R (1987)

Jaime Kaplan (born October 1, 1961) is an American former professional tennis player.

== Biography ==
Kaplan grew up in Macon, Georgia and remained unbeaten throughout her high school tennis career at Stratford Academy. She started her collegiate career at the University of Georgia, where she won the SEC doubles title in 1981, then played for Florida State University and was their first tennis player to qualify for the NCAA Championships. While at Florida State she was the Metro Conference singles champion in 1983 and also won two Metro doubles titles.

For the remainder of the 1980s, Kaplan competed on the professional tour and featured in the main draw of all four grand slam tournaments as a doubles player. Her best performance came at the 1987 Wimbledon Championships, where she made the round of 16 in the mixed doubles. She had a best doubles ranking of 91 in the world.

== ITF finals ==
Legend
$25,000 tournaments
$10,000 tournaments

=== Doubles: 12 (6–6) ===
Result	No.	Date	Tournament	Surface	Partner	Opponents	Score
Win	1.	June 18, 1983	Flemington, United States	Hard	(United States) Lee McGuire	(United States) Gigi Fernández (United States) Jane Forman	6–3, 3–6, 6–4
Loss	1.	August 22, 1983	Bronx, United States	Hard	(United States) Lee McGuire	(United States) Kathleen Cummings (United States) Robin White	4–6, 5–7
Loss	2.	October 9, 1983	Bendigo, Australia	Grass	(United States) Deeann Hansel	(United States) Lisa Dodson (United States) Lani Wilcox	7–6, 3–6, 4–6
Loss	3.	January 9, 1984	San Antonio, United States	Hard	(United States) Carol Christian	(Soviet Union) Elena Eliseenko (Soviet Union) Svetlana Parkhomenko	1–6, 1–6
Win	2.	January 16, 1984	Delray Beach, United States	Hard	(Soviet Union) Svetlana Parkhomenko	(United States) Carol Christian (United States) Jamie Golder	6–3, 6–1
Win	3.	October 28, 1984	Saga, Japan	Hard	(United States) Carol Watson	(United States) Kris Kinney (United States) Donna Rubin	6–4, 4–6, 6–1
Loss	4.	November 4, 1984	Matsuyama, Japan	Hard	(United States) Carol Watson	(United States) Kris Kinney (United States) Donna Rubin	4–6, 6–3, 3–6
Win	4.	November 12, 1984	Kuroshio, Japan	Hard	(United States) Carol Watson	(China) Li Xinyi (China) Zhong Ni	7–5, 6–3
Loss	5.	November 25, 1984	Kōfu, Japan	Hard	(United States) Carol Watson	(United States) Kris Kinney (United States) Donna Rubin	5–7, 3–6
Loss	6.	January 14, 1985	Delray Beach, United States	Hard	(United States) Diane Farrell	(Sweden) Elizabeth Ekblom (Netherlands) Marianne van der Torre	3–6, 5–7
Win	5.	July 15, 1985	Landskrona, Sweden	Clay	(Canada) Jill Hetherington	(Australia) Louise Field (Australia) Janine Thompson	7–5, 6–2
Win	6.	January 25, 1987	San Antonio, United States	Hard	(United States) Jennifer Goodling	(United States) Heather Crowe (United States) Kim Steinmetz	6–4, 6–4
