= Elna Reinach =

South African tennis player

- Country (sports): South Africa
- Born: 2 December 1968 (age 57) Pretoria, South Africa
- Turned pro: 1983
- Retired: 1995
- Prize money: $1,114,668

Singles
- Career record: 248–196
- Career titles: 1 WTA, 6 ITF
- Highest ranking: No. 26 (13 February 1989)

Grand Slam singles results
- Australian Open: 3R (1987)
- French Open: 4R (1991)
- Wimbledon: 3R (1988, 1990)
- US Open: 4R (1988)

Doubles
- Career record: 278–168
- Career titles: 10 WTA, 7 ITF
- Highest ranking: No. 10 (11 June 1990)

Grand Slam doubles results
- Australian Open: 3R (1987, 1994-95)
- French Open: SF (1988, 1990)
- Wimbledon: SF (1989)
- US Open: SF (1989)

Grand Slam mixed doubles results
- French Open: F (1993)
- US Open: W (1994)

Team competitions
- Fed Cup: 16–4

Elna Reinach (born 2 December 1968) is a South African former professional tennis player.

With Patrick Galbraith, she won the US Open mixed doubles championship in 1994. She played in the 1992 Summer Olympics. Reinach was runner-up at the French Open with Danie Visser in 1993. Her brother, Fanie, coached her and their sister, Monica, as well as Lori McNeil, Lindsay Davenport, and Laura Gildemeister. After retiring in 1995, she had a daughter named Lané and another daughter named Liezel.

== Grand Slam tournament finals ==
=== Mixed doubles: 2 (1 title, 1 runner-up) ===
Result	Year	Championship	Surface	Partner	Opponents	Score
Loss	1993	French Open	Clay	(South Africa) Danie Visser	(Russia) Andrei Olhovskiy (Russia) Eugenia Maniokova	2–6, 6–4, 4–6
Win	1994	US Open	Hard	(United States) Patrick Galbraith	(Australia) Todd Woodbridge (Czech Republic) Jana Novotná	6–2, 6–4

== WTA career finals ==
=== Singles: 2 (1 title, 1 runner-up) ===
Legend
Grand Slam (0/0)
Tier I (0/0)
Tier II (0/0)
Tier III (0/0)
Tier IV & V (1/1)

Result	No.	Date	Tournament	Surface	Opponent	Score
Loss	1.	Aug 1989	VS Albuquerque, United States	Hard	(United States) Lori McNeil	1–6, 3–6
Win	2.	Feb 1993	Auckland Classic, New Zealand	Hard	(United States) Caroline Kuhlman	6–0, 6–0

=== Doubles: 19 (10 titles, 9 runner-ups) ===
Result	No.	Date	Tournament	Surface	Partner	Opponents	Score
Loss	1.	Jul 1986	Berkeley, United States	Hard	(United States) Amy Holton	(United States) Beth Herr (United States) Alycia Moulton	1–6, 2–6
Loss	2.	Oct 1988	Filderstadt, Germany	Carpet (i)	(Italy) Raffaella Reggi	(Poland) Iwona Kuczyńska (United States) Martina Navratilova	1–6, 4–6
Win	3.	Aug 1989	Albuquerque, United States	Hard	(Australia) Nicole Provis	(Italy) Raffaella Reggi (Spain) Arantxa Sánchez Vicario	4–6, 6–4, 6–2
Loss	4.	Oct 1989	Filderstadt, Germany	Carpet (i)	(Italy) Raffaella Reggi	(United States) Gigi Fernández (United States) Robin White	4–6, 6–7
Loss	5.	Oct 1989	Bayonne, France	Hard	(Italy) Raffaella Reggi	(Netherlands) Manon Bollegraf (France) Catherine Tanvier	6–7, 5–7
Win	6.	May 1990	Berlin, Germany	Clay	(Australia) Nicole Provis	(Australia) Hana Mandlíková (Czechoslovakia) Jana Novotná	6–2, 6–1
Win	7.	May 1990	Strasbourg, France	Clay	(Australia) Nicole Provis	(United States) Kathy Jordan (Australia) Liz Smylie	6–1, 6–4
Loss	8.	May 1991	Rome, Italy	Clay	(Australia) Nicole Provis	(United States) Jennifer Capriati (Socialist Federal Republic of Yugoslavia) Monica Seles	5–7, 2–6
Loss	9.	May 1991	Berlin, Germany	Clay	(Australia) Nicole Provis	(Soviet Union) Larisa Savchenko (Soviet Union) Natalia Zvereva	3–6, 3–6
Loss	10.	Jun 1991	Birmingham, England	Grass	(United States) Sandy Collins	(Australia) Nicole Provis (Australia) Liz Smylie	3–6, 4–6
Loss	11.	Nov 1991	Scottsdale, United States	Hard	(United States) andy Collins	(United States) Mareen Harper (United States) Cammy MacGregor	5–7, 6–3, 3–6
Win	12.	Nov 1991	Brentwood, United States	Hard	(United States) Sandy Collins	(Indonesia) Yayuk Basuki (Netherlands) Caroline Vis	5–7, 6–4, 7–6
Win	13.	May 1992	Zürich, Switzerland	Clay	(United States) Amy Frazier	(Czechoslovakia) Karina Habšudová (United States) Marianne Werdel	7–5, 6–2
Loss	14.	Jun 1992	Birmingham, England	Grass	(United States) Sandy Collins	(United States) Lori McNeil (Australia) Rennae Stubbs	7–5, 3–6, 6–8
Win	15.	Nov 1992	San Juan, Puerto Rico	Hard	(South Africa) Amanda Coetzer	(United States) Gigi Fernández (United States) Kathy Rinaldi	6–2, 4–6, 6–2
Win	16.	Nov 1992	VS Indianapolis, United States	Hard (i)	(United States) Katrina Adams	(United States) Sandy Collins (United States) Mary-Lou Daniels	5–7, 6–2, 6–4
Win	17.	Feb 1993	Auckland Open, New Zealand	Hard	(France) Isabelle Demongeot	(Canada) Jill Hetherington (United States) Kathy Rinaldi	6–2, 6–4
Win	18.	Nov 1994	Quebec City, Canada	Carpet	(France) Nathalie Tauziat	(United States) Linda Wild (United States) Chanda Rubin	6–4, 6–3
Win	19.	Feb 1995	Auckland, New Zealand	Hard	(Canada) Jill Hetherington	(Italy) Laura Golarsa (Netherlands) Caroline Vis	7–6, 6–2

== ITF finals ==
Legend
$25,000 tournaments
$10,000 tournaments

=== Singles (6–1) ===
Result	No.	Date	Tournament	Surface	Opponent	Score
Win	1.	30 December 1980	Cape Town, South Africa	Hard	(South Africa) Monica Reinach	7–5, 6–4
Win	2.	30 December 1980	Cumberland, United Kingdom	Hard	(United Kingdom) Nancy Cohen	7–5, 7–5
Loss	3.	5 May 1985	Sutton, United Kingdom	Hard	(Japan) Kumiko Okamoto	4–6, 7–6, 2–6
Win	4.	20 May 1985	Bath, United Kingdom	Clay	(China) Zhong Ni	6–3, 6–4
Win	5.	17 January 1986	El Paso, United States	Hard	(Netherlands) Nanette Schutte	2–6, 6–1, 6–4
Win	6.	22 December 1986	Johannesburg, South Africa	Hard	(South Africa) Karen Schimper	2–6, 6–3, 6–1
Win	7.	18 January 1988	Pretoria, South Africa	Hard	(South Africa) Mariaan de Swardt	6–3, 6–4

=== Doubles (7–2) ===
Result	No.	Date	Tournament	Surface	Partner	Opponents	Score
Win	1.	9 December 1984	Hull, United Kingdom	Hard	(South Africa) Monica Reinach	(United Kingdom) Cathy Drury (United Kingdom) Ellinore Lightbody	6–3, 6–3
Win	2.	15 April 1985	Cumberland, United Kingdom	Hard	(South Africa) Monica Reinach	(United Kingdom) Lorrayne Gracie (West Germany) Martina Reinhardt	6–2, 6–4
Win	3.	28 April 1985	Hatfield, United Kingdom	Hard	(South Africa) Monica Reinach	(China) Li Xinyi (China) Zhong Ni	2–6, 6–2, 9–7
Loss	4.	6 May 1985	Bournemouth, United Kingdom	Hard	(South Africa) Monica Reinach	(China) Li Xinyi (China) Zhong Ni	7–5, 5–7, 4–6
Win	5.	20 May 1985	Bath, United Kingdom	Clay	(South Africa) Monica Reinach	(United Kingdom) Belinda Borneo (United Kingdom) Joy Tacon	6–3, 6–3
Loss	6.	10 January 1986	Miami, United States	Hard	(South Africa) Monica Reinach	(Czechoslovakia) Jana Novotná (Japan) Fukiko Osawa	7–6, 2–6, 2–6
Win	7.	17 November 1986	Johannesburg, South Africa	Hard	(South Africa) Monica Reinach	(United States) Mary Dailey (South Africa) Dianne Van Rensburg	1–6, 6–1, 6–3
Win	8.	15 December 1986	Johannesburg, South Africa	Hard	(South Africa) Monica Reinach	(United Kingdom) Katie Rickett (United Kingdom) Valda Lake	6–4, 6–2
Win	9.	18 January 1988	Pretoria, South Africa	Hard	(South Africa) Dianne Van Rensburg	(South Africa) Linda Barnard (South Africa) Mariaan de Swardt	3–6, 6–4, 6–4
