= Great Hatfield =

Village in the East Riding of Yorkshire, England

Coordinates: 53.868542°N 0.195526°W

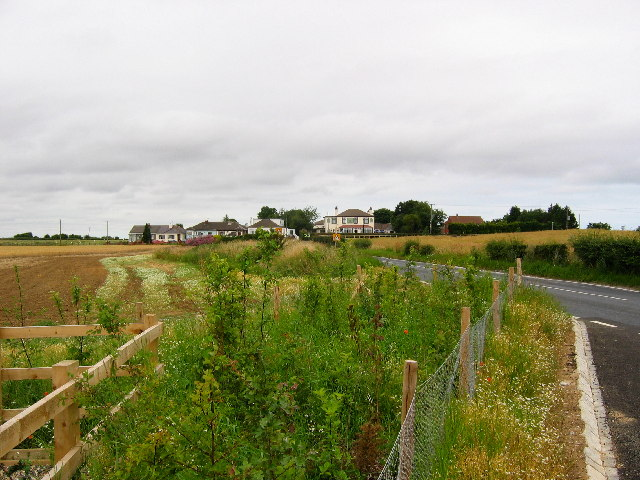
- Great Hatfield

- Location within the East Riding of Yorkshire
- OS grid reference: TA187428
  - London: 160 mi (260 km) S
- Civil parish: Hatfield
- Unitary authority: East Riding of Yorkshire
- Ceremonial county: East Riding of Yorkshire
- Region: Yorkshire and the Humber
- Country: England
- Sovereign state: United Kingdom
- Post town: HULL
- Postcode district: HU11
- Dialling code: 01964
- Police: Humberside
- Fire: Humberside
- Ambulance: Yorkshire
- UK Parliament: Beverley and Holderness

Great Hatfield is a village in the civil parish of Hatfield, in the East Riding of Yorkshire, England in an area known as Holderness. It is situated approximately 3.5 miles (5.6 km) south-west of Hornsea town centre, and less than one mile (1.6 km) east of Little Hatfield.

Great Hatfield was formerly a township in the parishes of Mappleton and Sigglesthorne, in 1866 Great Hatfield became a civil parish, on 1 April 1935 the parish was abolished and merged with Goxhill and Little Hatfield to form Hatfield. In 1931 the parish had a population of 147.

The name Hatfield derives from the Old English hǣðfeld meaning 'heath field'.

In 1823 Great Hatfield was in the civil parish of Mappleton and Sigglesthorne, and in the Wapentake and Liberty of Holderness. An "ancient stone cross of exquisite workmanship" was recorded at the village centre. There was a burial place but no place of worship. A previous chapel had burnt down a hundred years previously, although a stone, with the inscription "Here lieth the body of Expopher Constable, A.D. 642", marked its location. Population at the time was 127, with occupations including ten farmers, a grocer, a tailor, and a shoemaker. A carrier operated between the village and Hull once a week.

Great Hatfield was served from 1864 to 1964 by Sigglesthorne railway station on the Hull and Hornsea Railway. Landmarks include St Helen's Well, the Wrygarth Inn pub, and nearby 'Hatfield Paddock' football pitch adjacent to Densholme farm.

== See also ==
- Listed buildings in Hatfield, East Riding of Yorkshire
