= Little Hatfield =

Hamlet in the East Riding of Yorkshire, England

Coordinates: 53.872273°N 0.215976°W

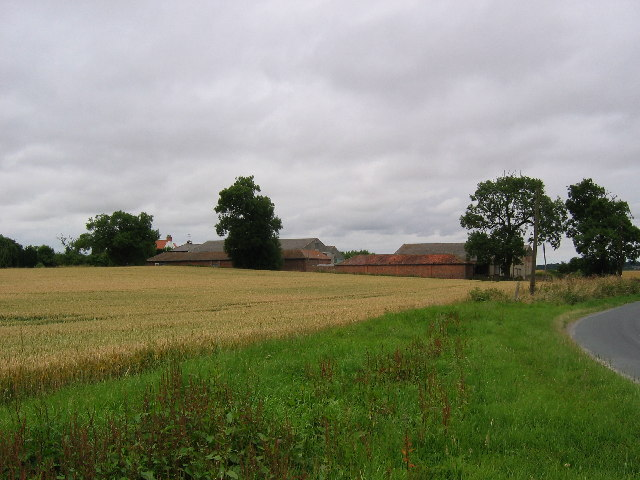
- Little Hatfield

- Location within the East Riding of Yorkshire
- OS grid reference: TA173432
  - London: 160 mi (260 km) S
- Civil parish: Hatfield
- Unitary authority: East Riding of Yorkshire
- Ceremonial county: East Riding of Yorkshire
- Region: Yorkshire and the Humber
- Country: England
- Sovereign state: United Kingdom
- Post town: HULL
- Postcode district: HU11
- Dialling code: 01964
- Police: Humberside
- Fire: Humberside
- Ambulance: Yorkshire
- UK Parliament: Beverley and Holderness

Little Hatfield is a small hamlet in the civil parish of Hatfield, in the East Riding of Yorkshire, England, in an area known as Holderness. It is situated approximately 3 miles (5 km) south-west of Hornsea town centre, and less than 1 mile (1.6 km) west of Great Hatfield.

Little Hatfield was formerly a township in the parish of Sigglesthorne, in 1866 Little Hatfield became a separate civil parish, on 1 April 1935 the parish was abolished and merged with Goxhill and Great Hatfield to form "Hatfield". In 1931 the parish had a population of 63.

In 1823 Little Hatfield was in the Wapentake and Liberty of Holderness. Population at the time was 25, which included a farmer.

Little Hatfield was served from 1864 to 1964 by Sigglesthorne railway station on the Hull and Hornsea Railway.

The name Hatfield derives from the Old English hǣðfeld meaning 'heath field'.
