= Maite Martínez Pérez =

Spanish tennis player (born 1967)

- Country (sports): Spain
- Born: 24 November 1967 (age 57)
- Prize money: $17,456

Singles
- Career record: 45–33
- Career titles: 3 ITF
- Highest ranking: No. 206 (13 Aug 1990)

Doubles
- Career record: 12–24
- Highest ranking: No. 306 (20 Nov 1989)

Maite Martínez Pérez (born 24 November 1967) is a Spanish former professional tennis player.

Martínez reached a career high singles ranking of 206 in the world and won three ITF titles. She made her only WTA Tour main draw appearance at the 1991 Spanish Open, held in Barcelona.

== ITF finals ==
=== Singles: 3 (3–0) ===
Result	No.	Date	Tournament	Surface	Opponent	Score
Win	1.	11 June 1989	Cascais, Portugal	Clay	(Brazil) Alessandra Kaul	6–3, 6–2
Win	2.	18 June 1989	Vilamoura, Portugal	Hard	(South Africa) Robyn Field	3–6, 6–2, 6–1
Win	3.	17 March 1991	Murcia, Spain	Hard	(China) Li Fang	7–6, 5–7, 6–3
