= Jo Louis =

British tennis player

- Full name: Joanne Louis
- Country (sports): (United Kingdom) Great Britain
- Born: 27 April 1967 (age 58)
- Plays: Right-handed
- Prize money: $30,393

Singles
- Career record: 54–77
- Highest ranking: No. 282 (31 August 1987)

Grand Slam singles results
- Australian Open: Q1 (1985)
- Wimbledon: 1R (1984, 1985, 1986, 1987)

Doubles
- Career record: 38–48
- Highest ranking: No. 259 (24 October 1988)

Grand Slam doubles results
- Wimbledon: 1R (1986 1989)

Joanne Louis (born 27 April 1967) is a British former professional tennis player.

Louis made four singles main draw appearances at Wimbledon while competing on the professional tour in the 1980s and had a career high ranking of 282 in the world. She comes from Devon.

== ITF titles ==
=== Doubles: (3) ===
No.	Date	Tournament	Surface	Partner	Opponents	Score
1.	20 April 1987	Queens, United Kingdom	Hard	(France) Frédérique Martin	(Belgium) Ilse de Ruysscher (United Kingdom) Valda Lake	6–1, 7–5, 6–4
2.	25 April 1988	Sutton, United Kingdom	Clay	(United Kingdom) Amanda Grunfeld	(Sweden) Monica Lundqvist (Sweden) Maria Ekstrand	4–6, 7–6, 6–4
3.	8 May 1989	Lee-on-Solent, United Kingdom	Clay	(United Kingdom) Alexandra Niepel	(Netherlands) Amy van Buuren (United Kingdom) Belinda Borneo	6–3, 6–2
