= Kirchheim im Innkreis =

- Municipality
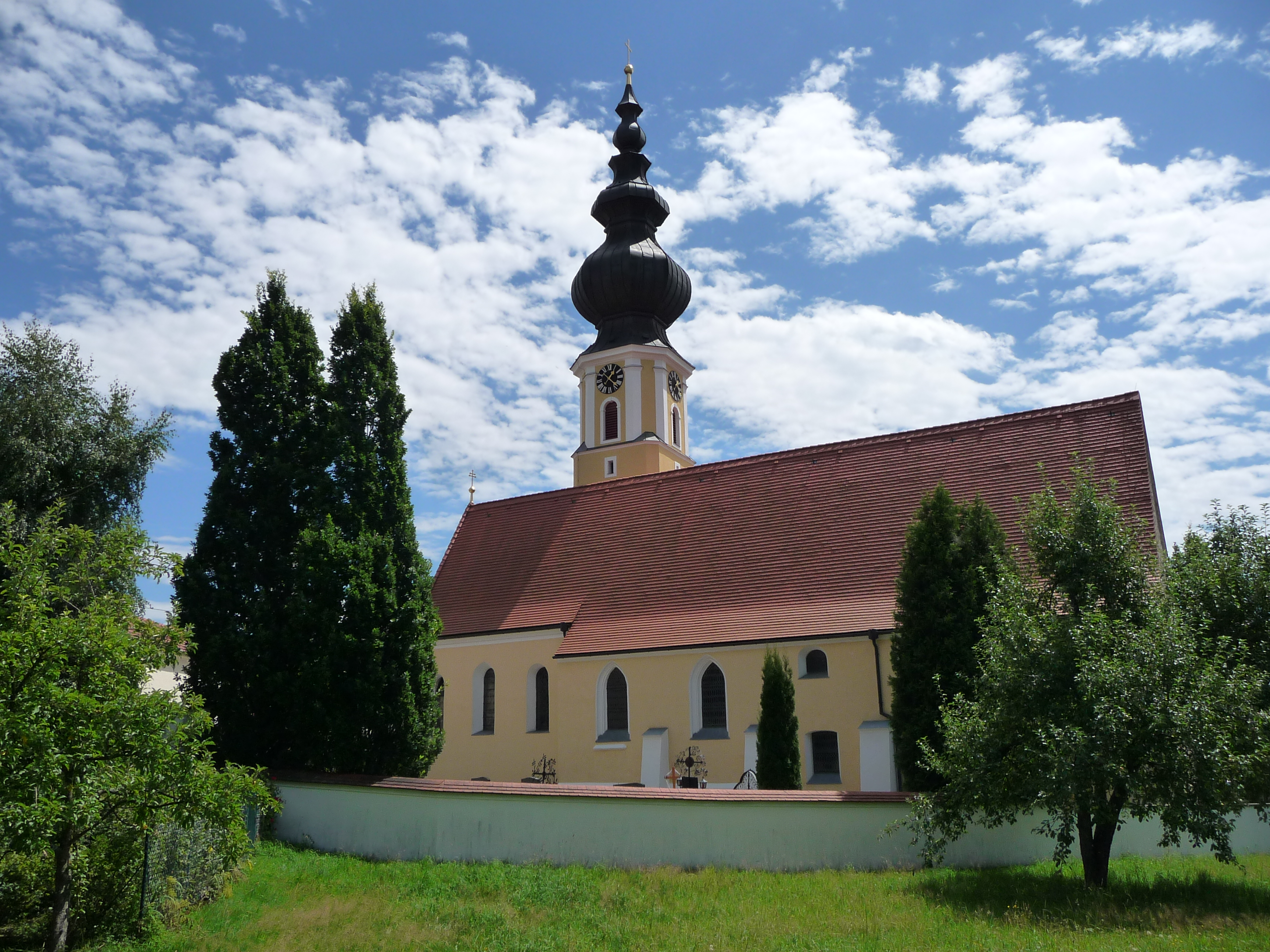

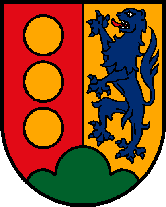
- Coat of arms

- Location within Austria
- Coordinates: 48°12′35″N 13°21′40″E
- Country: Austria
- State: Upper Austria
- District: Ried im Innkreis

Government
  - Mayor: Johann Hartl (ÖVP)

Area
  - Total: 10.26 km^{2} (3.96 sq mi)
- Elevation: 429 m (1,407 ft)

Population (2018-01-01)
  - Total: 716
  - Density: 69.8/km^{2} (181/sq mi)
- Time zone: UTC+1 (CET)
  - Summer (DST): UTC+2 (CEST)
- Postal code: 4932
- Area code: 07755
- Vehicle registration: RI
- Website: www.kirchheim.at

Kirchheim im Innkreis is a municipality in the district of Ried im Innkreis in the Austrian state of Upper Austria.

== Population ==
Historical population
Year	Pop.	±%
1869	684	—
1880	649	−5.1%
1890	631	−2.8%
1900	600	−4.9%
1910	607	+1.2%
1923	596	−1.8%
1934	597	+0.2%
1939	595	−0.3%
1951	710	+19.3%
1961	570	−19.7%
1971	580	+1.8%
1981	588	+1.4%
1991	619	+5.3%
2001	704	+13.7%
2013	704	+0.0%
