= Hatfield, East Riding of Yorkshire =

Civil parish in the East Riding of Yorkshire, England

Coordinates: 53°52′N 0°12′W

Hatfield
- Civil parish
- Population: 249 (2011 census)
- OS grid reference: TA183426
- Civil parish: Hatfield
- Unitary authority: East Riding of Yorkshire
- Ceremonial county: East Riding of Yorkshire
- Region: Yorkshire and the Humber
- Country: England
- Sovereign state: United Kingdom
- Post town: HULL
- Postcode district: HU11
- Dialling code: 01964
- Police: Humberside
- Fire: Humberside
- Ambulance: Yorkshire
- UK Parliament: Beverley and Holderness

Hatfield is a civil parish in the East Riding of Yorkshire, England. It is situated 3 miles (5 km) to the south-west of Hornsea town centre and covering an area of 1,336.789 hectares (3,303.28 acres).

The civil parish was formed in 1935 from the merger of the parishes of Great Hatfield, Goxhill and Little Hatfield.

According to the 2011 UK census, Hatfield parish had a population of 249, a decrease on the 2001 UK census figure of 258.

== See also ==
- Listed buildings in Hatfield, East Riding of Yorkshire
