= Goxhill, East Riding of Yorkshire =

Hamlet in the East Riding of Yorkshire, England

Coordinates: 53°53′00″N 0°11′48″W

Goxhill
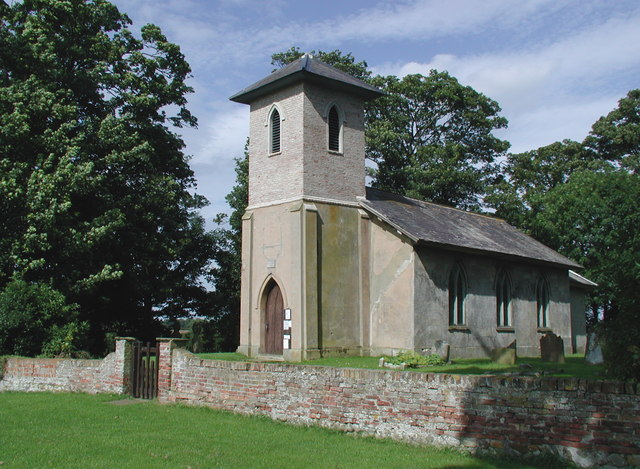
- St Giles church, Goxhill

- Location within the East Riding of Yorkshire
- OS grid reference: TA184448
  - London: 160 mi (260 km) S
- Civil parish: Hatfield
- Unitary authority: East Riding of Yorkshire
- Ceremonial county: East Riding of Yorkshire
- Region: Yorkshire and the Humber
- Country: England
- Sovereign state: United Kingdom
- Post town: HULL
- Postcode district: HU11
- Dialling code: 01964
- Police: Humberside
- Fire: Humberside
- Ambulance: Yorkshire
- UK Parliament: Beverley and Holderness

Goxhill is a small hamlet in the civil parish of Hatfield, in the East Riding of Yorkshire, England in an area known as Holderness. It is situated approximately 2 miles (3.2 km) south-west of Hornsea town centre. In 1931 the parish had a population of 70.

On 1 April 1935 the parish was abolished and merged with Great Hatfield and Little Hatfield to form Hatfield.

The name Goxhill could perhaps be derived from the Old Norse geysill meaning 'a gush of water'.

The parish church of St Giles is a Grade II listed building.

In 1823, Goxhill parish was in the Wapentake and Liberty of Holderness. At the time, the parish church was undergoing repairs, begun in 1818. The population was 70, which included five farmers. In 1840 the population was 65, again with five farmers, the parish land of 880 acres (3.6 km^{2}) the property of Rev Charles Constable, who had been patron of the St Giles Church incumbent since 1823.

Goxhill was served from 1865 to 1953 by Wassand railway station on the Hull and Hornsea Railway.

== See also ==
- Listed buildings in Hatfield, East Riding of Yorkshire
