= 1990 Kraft General Foods of Moscow – Singles =

Singles
- 1990 Kraft General Foods of Moscow

Final
- Champion: (Soviet Union) Leila Meskhi
- Runner-up: (Soviet Union) Elena Brioukhovets
- Score: 6–4, 6–4

Details
- Draw: 32 (2WC/4Q)
- Seeds: 8

Events
Singles	Doubles
← 1989 ·	Moscow Ladies Open	· 1991 →

Gretchen Magers was the defending champion, but lost in the semifinals to Elena Brioukhovets.

Leila Meskhi won the title by defeating Brioukhovets 6–4, 6–4 in the final.

== Seeds ==
1. (Soviet Union) Leila Meskhi (champion)
2. (United States) Gretchen Magers (semifinals)
3. (Soviet Union) Larisa Savchenko (second round)
4. (Australia) Rachel McQuillan (quarterfinals)
5. (Argentina) Mercedes Paz (first round)
6. (Italy) Laura Golarsa (second round)
7. (United States) Robin White (second round)
8. (Soviet Union) Natalia Medvedeva (first round)

== Draw ==
=== Key ===
- Q = Qualifier
- WC = Wild card
- LL = Lucky loser
- Alt = Alternate
- SE = Special exempt
- PR = Protected ranking
- ITF = ITF entry
- JE = Junior exempt
- w/o = Walkover
- r = Retired
- d = Defaulted
- SR = Special ranking

=== Finals ===
Semifinals
1	(Soviet Union) Leila Meskhi	6	6
(Australia) Anne Minter	2	4
(Soviet Union) Elena Brioukhovets	6	6
2	(United States) Gretchen Magers	4	3

Final
1	(Soviet Union) Leila Meskhi	6	6
(Soviet Union) Elena Brioukhovets	4	4

=== Top half ===
First round
1	(Soviet Union) L Meskhi	6	6
LL	(Czechoslovakia) D Krajčovičová	3	0
(Bulgaria) M Maleeva	4	6	6
(Czechoslovakia) E Švíglerová	6	1	1
(Finland) P Thorén	2	4
(Czechoslovakia) K Habšudová	6	6
(United States) A Leand	2	1
7	(United States) R White	6	6
3	(Soviet Union) L Savchenko	5	7	6
Q	(Soviet Union) A Blumberga	7	5	3
(Australia) K Godridge	6	2
Q	(Belgium) A Devries	4	1^{r}
(Australia) A Minter	6	7
(Australia) K Sharpe	0	5
WC	(Soviet Union) E Makarova	1	4
6	(Italy) L Golarsa	6	6

Second round
1	(Soviet Union) L Meskhi	6	6
(Bulgaria) M Maleeva	2	1
(Czechoslovakia) K Habšudová	7	6
7	(United States) R White	5	3
3	(Soviet Union) L Savchenko	3	6^{4}
(Australia) K Godridge	6	7^{7}
(Australia) A Minter	7	6
6	(Italy) L Golarsa	5	3

Quarterfinals
1	(Soviet Union) L Meskhi	4	6	6
(Czechoslovakia) K Habšudová	6	3	1
(Australia) K Godridge	4	0
(Australia) A Minter	6	6

Semifinals
1	(Soviet Union) L Meskhi	6	6
(Australia) A Minter	2	4

=== Bottom half ===
First round
8	(Soviet Union) N Medvedeva	6	2	2
(Luxembourg) K Kschwendt	2	6	6
(Soviet Union) E Brioukhovets	6	6
Q	(Soviet Union) N Biletskaya	3	0
(Australia) L Field	2	4
(Austria) S Dopfer	6	6
Q	(Soviet Union) V Milvidskaia	1	6^{5}
4	(Australia) R McQuillan	6	7^{7}
5	(Argentina) M Paz	6^{3}	6^{9}
(United States) A Henricksson	7^{7}	7^{11}
(Austria) B Reinstadler	6	6
WC	(Soviet Union) E Maniokova	2	3
(West Germany) S Meier	3	1
(United Kingdom) S Loosemore	6	6
(Belgium) S Wasserman	3	6	2
2	(United States) G Magers	6	4	6

Second round
(Luxembourg) K Kschwendt	6^{5}	4
(Soviet Union) E Brioukhovets	7^{7}	6
(Austria) S Dopfer	6^{5}	3
4	(Australia) R McQuillan	7^{7}	6
(United States) A Henricksson	2	3
(Austria) B Reinstadler	6	6
(United Kingdom) S Loosemore	3	3
2	(United States) G Magers	6	6

Quarterfinals
(Soviet Union) E Brioukhovets	6	6
4	(Australia) R McQuillan	3	0
(Austria) B Reinstadler	5	6	4
2	(United States) G Magers	7	2	6

Semifinals
(Soviet Union) E Brioukhovets	6	6
2	(United States) G Magers	4	3
