= 1995 Moscow Ladies Open – Singles =

Singles
- 1995 Moscow Ladies Open
- 1994 Champion: (Bulgaria) Magdalena Maleeva

Final
- Champion: (Bulgaria) Magdalena Maleeva
- Runner-up: (Russia) Elena Makarova
- Score: 6–4, 6–2

Details
- Draw: 32
- Seeds: 8

Events
Singles	Doubles
← 1994 ·	Moscow Ladies Open

The 1995 Moscow Ladies Open singles was a tennis tournament played on indoor carpet courts at the Olympic Stadium in Moscow in Russia that was part of 1995 Moscow Ladies Open. The tournament was held from September 18 through September 23, 1995.

Magdalena Maleeva was the defending champion and won in the final 6–4, 6–2 against Elena Makarova.

== Seeds ==
A champion seed is indicated in bold text while text in italics indicates the round in which that seed was eliminated.

1. (Bulgaria) **Magdalena Maleeva (champion)**
2. (Czech Republic) Helena Suková (first round)
3. (Belgium) Sabine Appelmans (quarterfinals)
4. (Netherlands) Kristie Boogert (first round)
5. (Italy) Silvia Farina (first round)
6. (Sweden) Åsa Carlsson (quarterfinals)
7. (Russia) Elena Makarova (final)
8. (Russia) Elena Likhovtseva (quarterfinals)

== Draw ==
Key

- Q = Qualifier
- WC = Wild card
- LL = Lucky loser
- Alt = Alternate
- ITF = ITF entry
- PR = Protected ranking
- SR = Special ranking
- SE = Special exempt
- JE = Junior exempt
- JR = Junior Accelerator Programme entrant
- CO = College Accelerator Programme entrant
- NG = Next Gen Accelerator Program entrant
- w/o = Walkover
- r = Retired
- d = Defaulted

First round
1	(Bulgaria) **M Maleeva**	**6**	**6**
Q	(Ukraine) E Tatarkova	2	3
(United States) E deLone	**6**	3	2
(Latvia) **L Savchenko**	0	**6**	**6**
(Federal Republic of Yugoslavia) T Ječmenica	6	1
(Belgium) **L Courtois**	**7**	**6**
WC	(Russia) E Kulikovskaya	6	1
6	(Sweden) **Å Carlsson**	**7**	**6**
4	(Netherlands) K Boogert	3	2
(United States) **M McGrath**	**6**	**6**
(Belgium) **N Feber**	**6**	**6**
(Austria) B Reinstadler	4	1
Q	(Russia) **J Lutrova**	6	**6**	**6**
(Belgium) E Callens	**7**	3	1
(Sweden) M Strandlund	**6**	3	1
8	(Russia) **E Likhovtseva**	4	**6**	**6**
7	(Russia) **E Makarova**	**6**	4	**6**
(Russia) E Maniokova	2	**6**	2
(Poland) **A Olsza**	**6**	**6**
(Portugal) S Prazeres	2	2
Q	(Russia) **A Kournikova**	**6**	3	**6**
(Germany) M Kochta	4	**6**	3
(France) I Demongeot	**6**	3	1
3	(Belgium) **S Appelmans**	4	**6**	**6**
5	(Italy) S Farina	4	5
(Finland) **N Dahlman**	**6**	**7**
WC	(Belarus) T Poutchek	4	**7**	4
(Russia) **O Ivanova**	**6**	6	**6**
(Italy) **A Serra Zanetti**	6	**6**	**6**
(Russia) T Panova	**7**	3	0
Q	(United Kingdom) C Wood	1	**6**	2
2	(Czech Republic) **H Suková**	**6**	2	**6**

Second round
1	(Bulgaria) **M Maleeva**	**6**	**6**
(Latvia) L Savchenko	1	2
(Belgium) L Courtois	3	**7**	3
6	(Sweden) **Å Carlsson**	**6**	6	**6**
(United States) **M McGrath**	**6**	**6**
(Belgium) N Feber	2	0
Q	(Russia) J Lutrova	0	0
8	(Russia) **E Likhovtseva**	**6**	**6**
7	(Russia) **E Makarova**	5	**6**	**6**
(Poland) A Olsza	**7**	3	3
Q	(Russia) A Kournikova	5	4
3	(Belgium) **S Appelmans**	**7**	**6**
(Finland) **N Dahlman**	**7**	**6**
(Russia) O Ivanova	6	4
(Italy) **A Serra Zanetti**	**6**	**6**
2	(Czech Republic) H Suková	3	2

Quarterfinals
1	(Bulgaria) **M Maleeva**	**6**	6	**6**
6	(Sweden) Å Carlsson	3	**7**	3
(United States) **M McGrath**	**6**	**6**
8	(Russia) E Likhovtseva	2	2
7	(Russia) **E Makarova**	**7**	**6**
3	(Belgium) S Appelmans	5	3
(Finland) N Dahlman	**6**	4	5
(Italy) **A Serra Zanetti**	2	**6**	**7**

Semifinals
1	(Bulgaria) **M Maleeva**	2	**6**	**6**
(United States) M McGrath	**6**	4	2
7	(Russia) **E Makarova**	**6**	**6**
(Italy) A Serra Zanetti	1	1

Final
1	(Bulgaria) **Magdalena Maleeva**	**6**	**6**
7	(Russia) Elena Makarova	4	2
