= 1991 St. Petersburg Open – Doubles =

Doubles
- 1991 St. Petersburg Open

Final
- Champions: (Soviet Union) Elena Brioukhovets (Soviet Union) Natalia Medvedeva
- Runners-up: (France) Isabelle Demongeot (United Kingdom) Jo Durie
- Score: 7–5, 6–3

Details
- Draw: 16 (1Q)
- Seeds: 4

Events
Singles	Doubles
← 1990 ·	Moscow Ladies Open	· 1994 →

Gretchen Magers and Robin White were the defending champions, but none competed this year.

Elena Brioukhovets and Natalia Medvedeva won the title by defeating Isabelle Demongeot and Jo Durie 7–5, 6–3 in the final.

== Seeds ==
1. (France) Isabelle Demongeot / (United Kingdom) Jo Durie (final)
2. (Soviet Union) Elena Brioukhovets / (Soviet Union) Natalia Medvedeva (champions)
3. (Czechoslovakia) Ivana Jankovská / (Czechoslovakia) Eva Melicharová (semifinals)
4. (United States) Donna Faber / (United States) Ann Henricksson (quarterfinals)

== Draw ==
=== Key ===
- Q = Qualifier
- WC = Wild card
- LL = Lucky loser
- Alt = Alternate
- ITF = ITF entry
- PR = Protected ranking
- SR = Special ranking
- SE = Special exempt
- JE = Junior exempt
- JR = Junior Accelerator Programme entrant
- CO = College Accelerator Programme entrant
- NG = Next Gen Accelerator Program entrant
- w/o = Walkover
- r = Retired
- d = Defaulted

=== Draw ===
First round
1	(France) I Demongeot (United Kingdom) J Durie	6	6
(New Zealand) B Cordwell (Sweden) M Lindström	3	2
Q	(Soviet Union) O Lugina (Soviet Union) E Makarova	2	2
(Soviet Union) E Maniokova (Austria) P Ritter	6	6
4	(United States) D Faber (United States) A Henricksson	7	6
(Austria) B Reinstadler (United Kingdom) S Smith	6	4
(France) S Testud (France) N van Lottum	6	6
(Soviet Union) S Parkhomenko (Soviet Union) N Bykova	3	3
(Finland) A Aallonen (Finland) P Thorén	0	1
(Italy) L Golarsa (Germany) B Rittner	6	6
(Netherlands) I Driehuis (Australia) L Pleming	6	6
3	(Czechoslovakia) I Jankovská (Czechoslovakia) E Melicharová	7	7
(Germany) H Kadzidroga (Germany) C Schneider	2	3
(Israel) I Berger (Japan) N Miyagi	6	6
(Germany) S Frankl (Czechoslovakia) H Vildová	4	4
2	(Soviet Union) E Brioukhovets (Soviet Union) N Medvedeva	6	6

Quarterfinals
1	(France) I Demongeot (United Kingdom) J Durie	6	1	6
(Soviet Union) E Maniokova (Austria) P Ritter	1	6	3
4	(United States) D Faber (United States) A Henricksson	0	5
(France) S Testud (France) N van Lottum	6	7
(Italy) L Golarsa (Germany) B Rittner	7	6	3
3	(Czechoslovakia) I Jankovská (Czechoslovakia) E Melicharová	5	7	6
(Israel) I Berger (Japan) N Miyagi	3	6
2	(Soviet Union) E Brioukhovets (Soviet Union) N Medvedeva	6	7

Semifinals
1	(France) I Demongeot (United Kingdom) J Durie	6	6
(France) S Testud (France) N van Lottum	1	4
3	(Czechoslovakia) I Jankovská (Czechoslovakia) E Melicharová	6	0
2	(Soviet Union) E Brioukhovets (Soviet Union) N Medvedeva	7	6

Final
1	(France) I Demongeot (United Kingdom) J Durie	5	3
2	(Soviet Union) E Brioukhovets (Soviet Union) N Medvedeva	7	6
