= 1994 Moscow Ladies Open – Singles =

Singles
- 1994 Moscow Ladies Open

Final
- Champion: (Bulgaria) Magdalena Maleeva
- Runner-up: (Italy) Sandra Cecchini
- Score: 7–5, 6–1

Details
- Draw: 32 (1WC/4Q)
- Seeds: 8

Events
Singles	Doubles
- Moscow Ladies Open

Larisa Neiland was the last tournament winner in 1991, but did not compete this year.

Magdalena Maleeva won the title by defeating Sandra Cecchini 7–5, 6–1 in the final.

== Seeds ==
1. (Bulgaria) Magdalena Maleeva (champion)
2. (Belgium) Sabine Appelmans (semifinals)
3. (Czech Republic) Helena Suková (quarterfinals)
4. (Italy) Sandra Cecchini (final)
5. (Kazakhstan) Elena Likhovtseva (quarterfinals)
6. (Italy) Silvia Farina Elia (quarterfinals)
7. (Russia) Elena Makarova (semifinals)
8. (France) Alexandra Fusai (first round)

== Draw ==
Key

- Q = Qualifier
- WC = Wild card
- LL = Lucky loser
- Alt = Alternate
- ITF = ITF entry
- PR = Protected ranking
- SR = Special ranking
- SE = Special exempt
- JE = Junior exempt
- JR = Junior Accelerator Programme entrant
- CO = College Accelerator Programme entrant
- NG = Next Gen Accelerator Program entrant
- w/o = Walkover
- r = Retired
- d = Defaulted

=== Finals ===
Semifinals
1	(Bulgaria) Magdalena Maleeva	3	6	6
7	(Russia) Elena Makarova	6	1	4
4	(Italy) Sandra Cecchini	7	6
2	(Belgium) Sabine Appelmans	5	3

Final
1	(Bulgaria) Magdalena Maleeva	7	6
4	(Italy) Sandra Cecchini	5	1

=== Top half ===
First round
1	(Bulgaria) M Maleeva	6	6
LL	(Finland) N Dahlman	4	0
(Switzerland) E Zardo	3	6
(Germany) K Kschwendt	6	7
(Slovakia) J Husárová	6	6	6
Q	(Ukraine) I Sukhova	7	3	4
(Netherlands) C Vis	1	1
5	(Kazakhstan) E Likhovtseva	6	6
3	(Czech Republic) H Suková	3	6	6
LL	(Germany) A Barna	6	3	4
(Belgium) L Courtois	7	6
(Italy) L Golarsa	6	3
(Federal Republic of Yugoslavia) T Ječmenica	6	6
WC	(Georgia (country)) N Louarsabishvili	2	4
(Czech Republic) L Richterová	2	6	4
7	(Russia) E Makarova	6	3	6

Second round
1	(Bulgaria) M Maleeva	6	6
(Germany) K Kschwendt	1	2
(Slovakia) J Husárová	1	2
5	(Kazakhstan) E Likhovtseva	6	6
3	(Czech Republic) H Suková	6	6
(Belgium) L Courtois	2	2
(Federal Republic of Yugoslavia) T Ječmenica	3	0
7	(Russia) E Makarova	6	6

Quarterfinals
1	(Bulgaria) M Maleeva	6	4	6
5	(Kazakhstan) E Likhovtseva	2	6	2
3	(Czech Republic) H Suková	2	4
7	(Russia) E Makarova	6	6

Semifinals
1	(Bulgaria) M Maleeva	3	6	6
7	(Russia) E Makarova	6	1	4

=== Bottom half ===
First round
8	(France) A Fusai	3	6
(Belgium) E Callens	6	7
(Germany) P Begerow	6	4	6
Q	(United Kingdom) A Wainwright	2	6	3
Q	(United Kingdom) E Bond	7	3	1
(Romania) R Dragomir	6	6	6
(Germany) S Meier	1	1
4	(Italy) S Cecchini	6	6
6	(Italy) S Farina Elia	2	6	6
(Russia) E Maniokova	6	4	1
(Austria) B Reinstadler	6	6
(Spain) M Sánchez Lorenzo	2	4
Q	(Russia) T Panova	6	6
(Ukraine) E Brioukhovets	3	1
(Sweden) Å Carlsson	3	7	2
2	(Belgium) S Appelmans	6	5	6

Second round
(Belgium) E Callens	6	6
(Germany) P Begerow	1	0
(Romania) R Dragomir	3	6	3
4	(Italy) S Cecchini	6	0	6
6	(Italy) S Farina Elia	2	6	6
(Austria) B Reinstadler	6	3	0
Q	(Russia) T Panova	1	0
2	(Belgium) S Appelmans	6	6

Quarterfinals
(Belgium) E Callens	4	6	3
4	(Italy) S Cecchini	6	2	6
6	(Italy) S Farina Elia	2	6
2	(Belgium) S Appelmans	6	7

Semifinals
4	(Italy) S Cecchini	7	6
2	(Belgium) S Appelmans	5	3
