= 1994 Moscow Ladies Open – Doubles =

Doubles
- 1994 Moscow Ladies Open

Final
- Champions: (Russia) Elena Makarova (Russia) Eugenia Maniokova
- Runners-up: (Italy) Laura Golarsa (Netherlands) Caroline Vis
- Score: 7-6^{(7–3)}, 6-4

Details
- Draw: 16 (1WC)
- Seeds: 4

Events
Singles	Doubles
← 1991 ·	Moscow Ladies Open	· 1995 →

Elena Brioukhovets and Natalia Medvedeva were the last tournament winners in 1991, but Medvedeva chose not to compete this year. Brioukhovets teamed up with Elena Likhovtseva and lost in the semifinals to Laura Golarsa and Caroline Vis.

Elena Makarova and Eugenia Maniokova won the title by defeating Golarsa and Vis 7-6^{(7–3)}, 6–4 in the final.

== Seeds ==
1. (Italy) Laura Golarsa / (Netherlands) Caroline Vis (final)
2. (Belgium) Sabine Appelmans / (Italy) Silvia Farina Elia (semifinals)
3. (Italy) Sandra Cecchini / (Romania) Ruxandra Dragomir Ilie (quarterfinals)
4. (Russia) Elena Makarova / (Russia) Eugenia Maniokova (champions)

== Draw ==
=== Key ===
- Q = Qualifier
- WC = Wild card
- LL = Lucky loser
- Alt = Alternate
- SE = Special exempt
- PR = Protected ranking
- ITF = ITF entry
- JE = Junior exempt
- w/o = Walkover
- r = Retired
- d = Defaulted
- SR = Special ranking

=== Draw ===
First round
1	(Italy) L Golarsa (Netherlands) C Vis	6	6
(United Kingdom) SA Siddall (United Kingdom) A Wainwright	2	3
(Germany) K Freye (Germany) R Kochta	2	7	4
(Sweden) Å Carlsson (Germany) K Kschwendt	6	5	6
3	(Italy) S Cecchini (Romania) R Dragomir Ilie	6	6
(United Kingdom) J Pullin (United Kingdom) L Woodroffe	4	2
(Ukraine) E Briuokhovets (Kazakhstan) E Likhovtseva	6	7
(Germany) An Barna (Ukraine) I Sukhova	4	5
(Belgium) E Callens (Romania) C Cristea	6	6
(Russia) N Egorova (Czech Republic) L Richterová	3	0
WC	(Federal Republic of Yugoslavia) T Ječmenica (Georgia (country)) N Louarsabishvili	3	2
4	(Russia) E Makarova (Russia) E Maniokova	6	6
(Germany) S Meier (Switzerland) E Zardo	2	2
(Finland) N Dahlman (Ukraine) O Lugina	6	6
(Belgium) L Courtois (France) A Fusai
2	(Belgium) S Appelmans (Italy) S Farina	w/o

Quarterfinals
1	(Italy) L Golarsa (Netherlands) C Vis	2	6	6
(Sweden) Å Carlsson (Germany) K Kschwendt	6	3	4
3	(Italy) S Cecchini (Romania) R Dragomir Ilie	4	2
(Ukraine) E Briuokhovets (Kazakhstan) E Likhovtseva	6	6
(Belgium) E Callens (Romania) C Cristea	4	6
4	(Russia) E Makarova (Russia) E Maniokova	6	7
(Finland) N Dahlman (Ukraine) O Lugina	5	6	6
2	(Belgium) S Appelmans (Italy) S Farina	7	4	7

Semifinals
1	(Italy) L Golarsa (Netherlands) C Vis	7	6
(Ukraine) E Briuokhovets (Kazakhstan) E Likhovtseva	5	3
4	(Russia) E Makarova (Russia) E Maniokova	6	6
2	(Belgium) S Appelmans (Italy) S Farina	4	3

Final
1	(Italy) L Golarsa (Netherlands) C Vis	6^{3}	4
4	(Russia) E Makarova (Russia) E Maniokova	7^{7}	6
