= 1991 St. Petersburg Open – Singles =

Singles
- 1991 St. Petersburg Open

Final
- Champion: (Soviet Union) Larisa Savchenko-Neiland
- Runner-up: (Germany) Barbara Rittner
- Score: 3–6, 6–3, 6–4

Details
- Draw: 32 (4Q)
- Seeds: 8

Events
Singles	Doubles
- Moscow Ladies Open

Leila Meskhi was the defending champion, but chose to compete at Bayotte in the same week.

Larisa Savchenko-Neiland won the title by defeating Barbara Rittner 3–6, 6–3, 6–4 in the final.

== Seeds ==
1. (Soviet Union) Elena Brioukhovets (quarterfinals)
2. (Soviet Union) Natalia Medvedeva (second round)
3. (Germany) Barbara Rittner (final)
4. (France) Isabelle Demongeot (quarterfinals)
5. (Soviet Union) Larisa Savchenko-Neiland (champion)
6. (United States) Donna Faber (first round)
7. (United Kingdom) Jo Durie (semifinals)
8. (Austria) Petra Ritter (second round)

== Draw ==
Key

- Q = Qualifier
- WC = Wild card
- LL = Lucky loser
- Alt = Alternate
- ITF = ITF entry
- PR = Protected ranking
- SR = Special ranking
- SE = Special exempt
- JE = Junior exempt
- JR = Junior Accelerator Programme entrant
- CO = College Accelerator Programme entrant
- NG = Next Gen Accelerator Program entrant
- w/o = Walkover
- r = Retired
- d = Defaulted

=== Finals ===
Semifinals
5	(Soviet Union) Larisa Savchenko-Neiland	6	6
7	(United Kingdom) Jo Durie	4	4
3	(Germany) Barbara Rittner	3	6	6
(Germany) Katja Oeljeklaus	6	3	4

Final
5	(Soviet Union) Larisa Savchenko-Neiland	3	6	6
3	(Germany) Barbara Rittner	6	3	4

=== Top half ===
First round
1	(Soviet Union) E Brioukhovets	6	6
Q	(Netherlands) I Driehuis	2	3
(Sweden) M Ekstrand	4	2
Q	(Belgium) D Monami	6	6
(United Kingdom) S Smith	6	4	4
(Japan) N Miyagi	2	6	6
(Germany) M Živec-Škulj	7	4	1
5	(Soviet Union) L Savchenko-Neiland	5	6	6
4	(France) I Demongeot	7	7
(Soviet Union) E Maniokova	6	5
(Sweden) C Dahlman	6	4	7
(Finland) P Thorén	1	6	5
(Soviet Union) S Komleva	4	3
Q	(Austria) B Reinstadler	6	6
(Israel) A Smashnova	1	4
7	(United Kingdom) J Durie	6	6

Second round
1	(Soviet Union) E Brioukhovets	w/o
Q	(Belgium) D Monami
(Japan) N Miyagi	4	4
5	(Soviet Union) L Savchenko-Neiland	6	6
4	(France) I Demongeot	6	6
(Sweden) C Dahlman	4	4
Q	(Austria) B Reinstadler	0	7	2
7	(United Kingdom) J Durie	6	6	6

Quarterfinals
1	(Soviet Union) E Brioukhovets	0	3
5	(Soviet Union) L Savchenko-Neiland	6	6
4	(France) I Demongeot	2	2
7	(United Kingdom) J Durie	6	6

Semifinals
5	(Soviet Union) L Savchenko-Neiland	6	6
7	(United Kingdom) J Durie	4	4

=== Bottom half ===
First round
8	(Austria) P Ritter	2	6	6
(Italy) L Golarsa	6	2	3
(France) S Testud	2	6	6
(New Zealand) B Cordwell	6	1	4
(Sweden) M Strandlund	3	4
(Socialist Federal Republic of Yugoslavia) B Mulej	6	6
(Austria) S Dopfer	2	3
3	(Germany) B Rittner	6	6
6	(United States) D Faber	0	6	5
(United States) A Henricksson	6	4	7
Q	(Israel) I Berger	6	6
(United Kingdom) S Loosemore	4	2
(Germany) S Frankl	2	6	6
(Germany) K Oeljeklaus	6	3	7
(France) N van Lottum	2	2
2	(Soviet Union) N Medvedeva	6	6

Second round
8	(Austria) P Ritter	7	1	5
(France) S Testud	5	6	7
(Socialist Federal Republic of Yugoslavia) B Mulej	6	3	1
3	(Germany) B Rittner	4	6	6
(United States) A Henricksson	6	6
Q	(Israel) I Berger	1	4
(Germany) K Oeljeklaus	3	6	6
2	(Soviet Union) N Medvedeva	6	3	1

Quarterfinals
(France) S Testud	6	2
3	(Germany) B Rittner	7	6
(United States) A Henricksson	7	3	3
(Germany) K Oeljeklaus	6	6	6

Semifinals
3	(Germany) B Rittner	3	6	6
(Germany) K Oeljeklaus	6	3	4
