= 1989 Virginia Slims of Moscow – Doubles =

Doubles
- 1989 Virginia Slims of Moscow

Final
- Champions: (Soviet Union) Larisa Savchenko (Soviet Union) Natasha Zvereva
- Runners-up: (France) Nathalie Herreman (France) Catherine Suire
- Score: 6–3, 6–4

Details
- Draw: 16 (1Q)
- Seeds: 4

Events
Singles	Doubles
- Moscow Ladies Open

In the inaugural edition of the tournament, Larisa Savchenko and Natasha Zvereva won the title by defeating Nathalie Herreman and Catherine Suire 6–3, 6–4 in the final.

== Seeds ==
1. (Soviet Union) Larisa Savchenko / (Soviet Union) Natasha Zvereva (champions)
2. (United States) Gretchen Magers / (United States) Betsy Nagelsen (first round)
3. (United States) Katrina Adams / (United States) Kathy Rinaldi (first round)
4. (France) Nathalie Herreman / (France) Catherine Suire (final)

== Draw ==
Key

- Q = Qualifier
- WC = Wild card
- LL = Lucky loser
- Alt = Alternate
- ITF = ITF entry
- PR = Protected ranking
- SR = Special ranking
- SE = Special exempt
- JE = Junior exempt
- JR = Junior Accelerator Programme entrant
- CO = College Accelerator Programme entrant
- NG = Next Gen Accelerator Program entrant
- w/o = Walkover
- r = Retired
- d = Defaulted

=== Draw ===
First round
1	(Soviet Union) L Savchenko (Soviet Union) N Zvereva	7^{7}	7^{7}
(Netherlands) C Bakkum (Sweden) M Strandlund	6^{3}	6^{4}
(Soviet Union) E Brioukhovets (France) J Halard	6^{2}	6^{2}
(Bulgaria) E Pampoulova (West Germany) M Pawlik	7^{7}	7^{7}
3	(United States) K Adams (United States) K Rinaldi	3	6	5
(Soviet Union) N Medvedeva (Soviet Union) L Meskhi	6	1	7
(Australia) M Jaggard (Netherlands) H Witvoet	6	4	5
(Italy) L Golarsa (Socialist Federal Republic of Yugoslavia) S Goleš	4	6	7
Q	(Soviet Union) A Khalatian (Soviet Union) E Maniokova	6	7^{7}
(Czechoslovakia) D Krajčovičová (Czechoslovakia) A Noháčová	1	6^{5}
(Australia) JA Faull (Australia) R McQuillan	6	3	4
4	(France) N Herreman (France) C Suire	4	6	6
(Czechoslovakia) A Strnadová (Czechoslovakia) E Švíglerová	6	1	3
(Australia) T Morton (Australia) R Stubbs	3	6	6
(Australia) L Field (United States) M Van Nostrand	7^{7}	7^{10}
2	(United States) G Magers (United States) B Nagelsen	6^{4}	6^{8}

Quarterfinals
1	(Soviet Union) L Savchenko (Soviet Union) N Zvereva	6	6
(Bulgaria) E Pampoulova (West Germany) M Pawlik	0	0
(Soviet Union) N Medvedeva (Soviet Union) L Meskhi	3	6	6
(Italy) L Golarsa (Socialist Federal Republic of Yugoslavia) S Goleš	6	4	2
Q	(Soviet Union) A Khalatian (Soviet Union) E Maniokova	4	2
4	(France) N Herreman (France) C Suire	6	6
(Australia) T Morton (Australia) R Stubbs	5	6^{0}
(Australia) L Field (United States) M Van Nostrand	7	7^{7}

Semifinals
1	(Soviet Union) L Savchenko (Soviet Union) N Zvereva	6	6
(Soviet Union) N Medvedeva (Soviet Union) L Meskhi	3	4
4	(France) N Herreman (France) C Suire	6	7
(Australia) L Field (United States) M Van Nostrand	3	5

Final
1	(Soviet Union) L Savchenko (Soviet Union) N Zvereva	6	6
4	(France) N Herreman (France) C Suire	3	4
