= 1995 Moscow Ladies Open – Doubles =

Doubles
- 1995 Moscow Ladies Open
- 1994 Champions: (Russia) Elena Makarova (Russia) Eugenia Maniokova

Final
- Champions: (United States) Meredith McGrath (Latvia) Larisa Savchenko
- Runners-up: (Russia) Anna Kournikova (Poland) Aleksandra Olsza
- Score: 6–1, 6–0

Events
Singles	Doubles
← 1994 ·	Moscow Ladies Open

The 1995 Moscow Ladies Open doubles was a tennis tournament played on indoor carpet courts at the Olympic Stadium in Moscow in Russia that was part of 1995 Moscow Ladies Open. The tournament was held from September 18 through September 23, 1995.

Elena Makarova and Eugenia Maniokova were the defending champions but lost in the first round to Anna Kournikova and Aleksandra Olsza.

Meredith McGrath and Larisa Savchenko won in the final 6–1, 6–0 against Kournikova and Olsza.

== Seeds ==
Champion seeds are indicated in bold text while text in italics indicates the round in which those seeds were eliminated.

1. (United States) **Meredith McGrath** / (Latvia) **Larisa Savchenko (champions)**
2. (Russia) Elena Makarova / (Russia) Eugenia Maniokova (first round)
3. (Sweden) Maria Lindström / (Sweden) Maria Strandlund (semifinals)
4. (Belgium) Laurence Courtois / (Belgium) Nancy Feber (first round)

== Draw ==
=== Key ===
- Q = Qualifier
- WC = Wild card
- LL = Lucky loser
- Alt = Alternate
- SE = Special exempt
- PR = Protected ranking
- ITF = ITF entry
- JE = Junior exempt
- w/o = Walkover
- r = Retired
- d = Defaulted
- SR = Special ranking

First round
1	(United States) **M McGrath** (Latvia) **L Savchenko**	**7**	**6**
(United States) E deLone (Russia) E Likhovtseva	6	4
Q	(Italy) A Serra Zanetti (Russia) E Tikhankina	**6**	2	1
(Sweden) **Å Carlsson** (France) **I Demongeot**	3	**6**	**6**
4	(Belgium) L Courtois (Belgium) N Feber	1	**6**	0
(Belgium) **S Appelmans** (Belgium) **E Callens**	**6**	3	**6**
(Russia) **T Panova** (Ukraine) **I Sukhova**	**7**	**7**
(Germany) S Haas (United Kingdom) A Wainwright	5	6
(Federal Republic of Yugoslavia) **T Ječmenica** (Ukraine) **E Tatarkova**	**6**	**7**
(Russia) A Linkova (Ukraine) N Nemchinova	0	5
(Russia) O Ivanova (Russia) E Kulikovskaya	2	4
3	(Sweden) **M Lindström** (Sweden) **M Strandlund**	**6**	**6**
(Finland) **N Dahlman** (United Kingdom) **C Wood**	**6**	**6**
(Russia) N Egorova (Russia) J Lutrova	4	0
(Russia) **A Kournikova** (Poland) **A Olsza**	0	**6**	**7**
2	(Russia) E Makarova (Russia) E Maniokova	**6**	1	6

Quarterfinals
1	(United States) **M McGrath** (Latvia) **L Savchenko**	**6**	**6**
(Sweden) Å Carlsson (France) I Demongeot	1	2
(Belgium) **S Appelmans** (Belgium) **E Callens**	**6**	**6**
(Russia) T Panova (Ukraine) I Sukhova	4	2
(Federal Republic of Yugoslavia) T Ječmenica (Ukraine) E Tatarkova	4	4
3	(Sweden) **M Lindström** (Sweden) **M Strandlund**	**6**	**6**
(Finland) N Dahlman (United Kingdom) C Wood	3	2
(Russia) **A Kournikova** (Poland) **A Olsza**	**6**	**6**

Semifinals
1	(United States) **M McGrath** (Latvia) **L Savchenko**	**6**	**6**
(Belgium) S Appelmans (Belgium) E Callens	2	1
3	(Sweden) M Lindström (Sweden) M Strandlund	**7**	5	5
(Russia) **A Kournikova** (Poland) **A Olsza**	5	**7**	**7**

Final
1	(United States) **Meredith McGrath** (Latvia) **Larisa Savchenko**	**6**	**6**
(Russia) Anna Kournikova (Poland) Aleksandra Olsza	1	0
