= 1989 Virginia Slims of Moscow – Singles =

Singles
- 1989 Virginia Slims of Moscow

Final
- Champion: (United States) Gretchen Magers
- Runner-up: (Soviet Union) Natasha Zvereva
- Score: 6–3, 6–4

Details
- Draw: 32 (2WC/4Q)
- Seeds: 8

Events
Singles	Doubles
- Moscow Ladies Open

In the inaugural edition of the tournament, Gretchen Magers won the title by defeating Natasha Zvereva 6–3, 6–4 in the final.

== Seeds ==
1. (United States) Pam Shriver (second round)
2. (Soviet Union) Natasha Zvereva (final)
3. (United States) Gretchen Magers (champion)
4. (Soviet Union) Leila Meskhi (second round)
5. (Soviet Union) Larisa Savchenko (semifinals)
6. (United States) Betsy Nagelsen (first round)
7. (United States) Kathy Rinaldi (first round)
8. (Australia) Jo-Anne Faull (first round)

== Draw ==
Key

- Q = Qualifier
- WC = Wild card
- LL = Lucky loser
- Alt = Alternate
- ITF = ITF entry
- PR = Protected ranking
- SR = Special ranking
- SE = Special exempt
- JE = Junior exempt
- JR = Junior Accelerator Programme entrant
- CO = College Accelerator Programme entrant
- NG = Next Gen Accelerator Program entrant
- w/o = Walkover
- r = Retired
- d = Defaulted

=== Finals ===
Semifinals
5	(Soviet Union) Larisa Savchenko	4	6	4
3	(United States) Gretchen Magers	6	3	6
(Soviet Union) Natalia Medvedeva	5	1
2	(Soviet Union) Natasha Zvereva	7	6

Final
3	(United States) Gretchen Magers	6	6
2	(Soviet Union) Natasha Zvereva	3	4

=== Top half ===
First round
1	(United States) P Shriver	6	6
(Australia) L Field	2	2
(Italy) F Romano	7^{7}	4	2
Q	(France) J Halard	6^{4}	6	6
(Australia) R McQuillan	7^{7}	6
Q	(Soviet Union) N Biletskaya	6^{4}	1
(Czechoslovakia) E Švíglerová	2	2
5	(Soviet Union) L Savchenko	6	6
3	(United States) G Magers	6	6
(Australia) M Jaggard	2	3
(Brazil) G Miró	3	7	4
(United States) K Adams	6	5	6
Q	(Hungary) R Szikszay	0	2
(Italy) L Golarsa	6	6
WC	(Soviet Union) E Brioukhovets	7	6
7	(United States) K Rinaldi	5	3

Second round
1	(United States) P Shriver	2	6	0
Q	(France) J Halard	6	3	6
(Australia) R McQuillan	6^{6}	6	6^{0}
5	(Soviet Union) L Savchenko	7^{8}	3	7^{7}
3	(United States) G Magers	6	7^{11}
(United States) K Adams	3	6^{9}
(Italy) L Golarsa	6	6
WC	(Soviet Union) E Brioukhovets	4	4

Quarterfinals
Q	(France) J Halard	4	2
5	(Soviet Union) L Savchenko	6	6
3	(United States) G Magers	4	7^{7}	6
(Italy) L Golarsa	6	6^{2}	3

Semifinals
5	(Soviet Union) L Savchenko	4	6	4
3	(United States) G Magers	6	3	6

=== Bottom half ===
First round
8	(Australia) JA Faull	1	4
(West Germany) S Hack	6	6
(United States) M Van Nostrand	2	6	6
(West Germany) M Pawlik	6	1	4
(Bulgaria) E Pampoulova	2	2
(Soviet Union) N Medvedeva	6	6
(France) P Paradis	4	4
4	(Soviet Union) L Meskhi	6	6
6	(United States) B Nagelsen	6	1	4
(Sweden) M Strandlund	2	6	6
(Socialist Federal Republic of Yugoslavia) S Goleš	5	6	6
(France) C Suire	7	2	0
(France) N Herreman	6	6
Q	(Czechoslovakia) A Strnadová	3	3
(Soviet Union) A Khalatian	3	0
2	(Soviet Union) N Zvereva	6	6

Second round
(West Germany) S Hack	7^{7}	6
(United States) M Van Nostrand	6^{5}	1
(Soviet Union) N Medvedeva	6	6
4	(Soviet Union) L Meskhi	4	1
(Sweden) M Strandlund	5	6	6
(Socialist Federal Republic of Yugoslavia) S Goleš	7	4	4
(France) N Herreman	1	3
2	(Soviet Union) N Zvereva	6	6

Quarterfinals
(West Germany) S Hack	4	4
(Soviet Union) N Medvedeva	6	6
(Sweden) M Strandlund	2	1
2	(Soviet Union) N Zvereva	6	6

Semifinals
(Soviet Union) N Medvedeva	5	1
2	(Soviet Union) N Zvereva	7	6
