= 1995 Moscow Ladies Open =

- Date: 18–23 September
- Edition: 5th
- Category: Tier III
- Draw: 32S / 16D
- Prize money: $400,000
- Surface: Carpet / indoor
- Location: Moscow, Russia
- Venue: Olympic Stadium

Champions

Singles
- (Bulgaria) Magdalena Maleeva

Doubles
- (United States) Meredith McGrath / (Latvia) Larisa Savchenko-Neiland
← 1994 ·	Moscow Ladies Open	· 1996 →

The 1995 Moscow Ladies Open was a women's tennis tournament played on indoor carpet courts at the Olympic Stadium in Moscow in Russia that was part of Tier III of the 1995 WTA Tour.

It was held from 18 September through 23 September 1995, and was the fifth edition of the WTA tournament inaugurated under the title of Moscow Open in 1989.

It was Anna Kournikova's WTA Tour debut. In the singles she made her way through qualification and, after beating German Marketa Kochta in the first round of the main draw, lost in the second round to third-seeded Belgian Sabine Appelmans.

== Finals ==
=== Singles ===
(Bulgaria) Magdalena Maleeva defeated (Russia) Elena Makarova 6–4, 6–2

- It was Maleeva's 1st singles title of the year and the 3rd of her career.

=== Doubles ===
(United States) Meredith McGrath / (Latvia) Larisa Savchenko-Neiland defeated (Russia) Anna Kournikova / (Poland) Aleksandra Olsza 6–1, 6–0

- It was McGrath's 4th title of the year and the 22nd of her career. It was Savchenko's 4th title of the year and the 55th of her career.
