= 1990 Kraft General Foods of Moscow – Doubles =

Doubles
- 1990 Kraft General Foods of Moscow

Final
- Champions: (United States) Gretchen Magers (United States) Robin White
- Runners-up: (Soviet Union) Elena Brioukhovets (Soviet Union) Eugenia Maniokova
- Score: 6–2, 6–4

Details
- Draw: 16 (1Q)
- Seeds: 4

Events
Singles	Doubles
- Moscow Ladies Open

Larisa Savchenko and Natasha Zvereva were the defending champions, but Zvereva did not compete this year. Savchenko teamed up with Mercedes Paz and lost in the semifinals to Elena Brioukhovets and Eugenia Maniokova.

Gretchen Magers and Robin White won the title by defeating Brioukhovets and Maniokova 6–2, 6–4 in the final.

== Seeds ==
1. (Argentina) Mercedes Paz / (Soviet Union) Larisa Savchenko (semifinals)
2. (United States) Gretchen Magers / (United States) Robin White (champions)
3. (Soviet Union) Natalia Medvedeva / (Soviet Union) Leila Meskhi (first round)
4. (Australia) Louise Field / (Australia) Rachel McQuillan (semifinals)

== Draw ==
Key

- Q = Qualifier
- WC = Wild card
- LL = Lucky loser
- Alt = Alternate
- ITF = ITF entry
- PR = Protected ranking
- SR = Special ranking
- SE = Special exempt
- JE = Junior exempt
- JR = Junior Accelerator Programme entrant
- CO = College Accelerator Programme entrant
- NG = Next Gen Accelerator Program entrant
- w/o = Walkover
- r = Retired
- d = Defaulted

=== Draw ===
First round
1	(Argentina) M Paz (Soviet Union) L Savchenko	6	6
(Finland) N Dahlman (Czechoslovakia) E Švíglerová	0	0
(Soviet Union) N Egorova (Soviet Union) S Parkhomenko	6	2	5
(Belgium) A Devries (Austria) H Sprung	3	6	7
3	(Soviet Union) N Medvedeva (Soviet Union) L Meskhi	4	6^{5}
(Soviet Union) E Brioukhovets (Soviet Union) E Maniokova	6	7^{7}
(Czechoslovakia) I Jankovská (Czechoslovakia) E Melicharová	6	7^{12}
(Soviet Union) A Blumberga (Finland) P Thorén	1	6^{10}
(Czechoslovakia) D Krajčovičová (Czechoslovakia) A Noháčová	6	6
Q	(Soviet Union) E Pogorelova (Soviet Union) I Zvereva	2	4
(Bulgaria) M Maleeva (West Germany) S Meier	5	4
4	(Australia) L Field (Australia) R McQuillan	7	6
(Australia) K Godridge (Australia) K Sharpe	2	6^{6}
(Australia) A Minter (Belgium) S Wasserman	6	7^{8}
(Italy) L Golarsa (United States) A Henricksson	0	2
2	(United States) G Magers (United States) R White	6	6

Quarterfinals
1	(Argentina) M Paz (Soviet Union) L Savchenko	6	6
(Belgium) A Devries (Austria) H Sprung	3	3
(Soviet Union) E Brioukhovets (Soviet Union) E Maniokova	6	6
(Czechoslovakia) I Jankovská (Czechoslovakia) E Melicharová	4	3
(Czechoslovakia) D Krajčovičová (Czechoslovakia) A Noháčová	2	6	1
4	(Australia) L Field (Australia) R McQuillan	6	4	6
(Australia) A Minter (Belgium) S Wasserman	1	2
2	(United States) G Magers (United States) R White	6	6

Semifinals
1	(Argentina) M Paz (Soviet Union) L Savchenko	6	2	5
(Soviet Union) E Brioukhovets (Soviet Union) E Maniokova	4	6	7
4	(Australia) L Field (Australia) R McQuillan	2	3
2	(United States) G Magers (United States) R White	6	6

Final
(Soviet Union) E Brioukhovets (Soviet Union) E Maniokova	2	4
2	(United States) G Magers (United States) R White	6	6
