= 1991 St. Petersburg Open =

- Date: September 21–29
- Edition: 3rd
- Category: Tier V
- Prize money: $100,000
- Surface: Carpet (i)
- Location: St. Petersburg, Soviet Union
- Venue: St. Petersburg Sports and Concert Complex (a.k.a. SKK Peterburgsky)

Champions

Singles
- (Soviet Union) Larisa Savchenko-Neiland

Doubles
- (Soviet Union) Elena Brioukhovets / (Soviet Union) Natalia Medvedeva
← 1990 ·	Moscow Ladies Open	· 1994 →

The 1991 St. Petersburg Open was a women's tennis tournament played from September 21 through 29, 1991, on indoor carpet courts at the St. Petersburg Sports and Concert Complex in Saint Petersburg, Soviet Union, that was part of Tier V of the 1991 Kraft General Foods World Tour (1991 WTA Tour). It was the third edition of the WTA tournament inaugurated under the title of Virginia Slims of Moscow in 1989 and later known as the Moscow Ladies Open.

== Finals ==
=== Singles ===
(Soviet Union) Larisa Savchenko-Neiland defeated (Germany) Barbara Rittner 3–6, 6–3, 6–4

- It was Savchenko-Neiland's 1st of 2 WTA singles titles of her career.

=== Doubles ===
(Soviet Union) Elena Brioukhovets / (Soviet Union) Natalia Medvedeva defeated (France) Isabelle Demongeot / (United Kingdom) Jo Durie 7–5, 6–3

- It was Brioukhovets's 1st WTA doubles title of the year and the 3rd and last of her career. It was Medvedeva's 1st WTA doubles title of the year and the 5th of her career.
