= 1990 Kraft General Foods of Moscow =

- Date: October 1–7
- Edition: 2nd
- Category: Tier V
- Prize money: $100,000
- Surface: Carpet / indoor
- Location: Moscow, Soviet Union
- Venue: Olympic Stadium

Champions

Singles
- (Soviet Union) Leila Meskhi

Doubles
- (United States) Gretchen Magers / (United States) Robin White
| ← 1989 · | Moscow Ladies Open | · 1991 → |

The Kraft General Foods of Moscow (Russian: Московский турнир «Крафт Дженерал Фудс»; after the title sponsor of that year's WTA tour) was a women's tennis tournament played on indoor carpet courts at the Olympic Stadium in Moscow, Soviet Union, that was part of Tier V of the 1990 Kraft General Foods World Tour (1990 WTA Tour).

It was held from October 1 through 7, 1990, and was the second edition of the WTA tournament inaugurated under the title of Virginia Slims of Moscow in 1989 and later known as the St. Petersburg Open and the Moscow Ladies Open.

== Finals ==
=== Singles ===
(Soviet Union) Leila Meskhi defeated (Soviet Union) Elena Brioukhovets 6–4, 6–4

- It was Meskhi's 2nd WTA singles title of the year and the 3rd of her career.

=== Doubles ===
(United States) Gretchen Magers / (United States) Robin White defeated (Soviet Union) Elena Brioukhovets / (Soviet Union) Eugenia Maniokova 6–2, 6–4

- It was Magers's 3rd WTA doubles title of the year and the 3rd of her career.
