= 1994 Moscow Ladies Open =

- Date: September 19–24
- Edition: 4th
- Category: Tier III
- Prize money: $150,000
- Surface: Carpet (i)
- Location: Moscow, Russia
- Venue: Olympic Stadium

Champions

Singles
- (Bulgaria) Magdalena Maleeva

Doubles
- (United States) Elena Makarova / (Russia) Eugenia Maniokova
← 1991 ·	Moscow Ladies Open	· 1995 →

The 1994 Moscow Ladies Open was a women's tennis tournament played on indoor carpet courts at the Olympic Stadium in Moscow, Russia, that was part of Tier III of the 1994 WTA Tour.

It was held from September 19 through 24, 1994.

It was the fourth edition of the WTA tournament inaugurated under the title of Virginia Slims of Moscow in 1989.

== Finals ==
=== Singles ===
(Bulgaria) Magdalena Maleeva defeated (Italy) Sandra Cecchini 7–5, 6–1

- It was Maleeva's 1st WTA singles title of the year and the 2nd of her career.

=== Doubles ===
(Russia) Elena Makarova / (Russia) Eugenia Maniokova defeated (Italy) Laura Golarsa / (Netherlands) Caroline Vis 7-6^{(6–3)}, 6-4

- It was Makarova's only doubles WTA title of her career. It was Maniokova's 2nd WTA doubles title of the year and the 4th and last of her career.
