= Eva Lena Olsson =

Swedish tennis player

- Country (sports): Sweden
- Born: 1969

Singles
- Career record: 8–39
- Highest ranking: No. 537 (24 April 1989)

Doubles
- Career record: 33–38
- Career titles: 1 ITF
- Highest ranking: No. 252 (5 February 1990)

Grand Slam doubles results
- Wimbledon: Q1 (1990)

Eva Lena Daun (born 1969) is a Swedish former professional tennis player who competed under her maiden name, Eva Lena Olsson.

Olsson twice made WTA Tour main draw appearances as a doubles player, at the 1988 Swedish Open and 1990 Estoril Open. She also featured in qualifying for the 1990 Wimbledon Championships.

== ITF finals ==
=== Doubles: 8 (1–7) ===
| Result | No. | Date | Tournament | Surface | Partner | Opponents | Score |
|---|---|---|---|---|---|---|---|
| Win | 1. | 6 March 1988 | Jaffa, Israel | Hard | (Sweden) Lena Sandin | (Israel) Dalia Koriat (Finland) Petra Thorén | 4–6, 7–5, 6–2 |
| Loss | 1. | 27 March 1988 | Ramat HaSharon, Israel | Hard | (Romania) Diane Samungi | (Sweden) Lena Sandin (Finland) Anne Aallonen | 5–7, 3–6 |
| Loss | 2. | 19 March 1989 | Haifa, Israel | Hard | (Sweden) Malin Nilsson | (Denmark) Sofie Albinus (Denmark) Lone Vandborg | 1–6, 4–6 |
| Loss | 3. | 26 March 1989 | Ramat HaSharon, Israel | Hard | (Sweden) Malin Nilsson | (Netherlands) Caroline Vis (Netherlands) Marianne van der Torre | 2–6, 2–6 |
| Loss | 4. | 16 April 1989 | Limoges, France | Clay | (France) Emmanuelle Derly | (South Africa) Michelle Anderson (South Africa) Robyn Field | 5–7, 0–6 |
| Loss | 5. | 28 January 1990 | Helsinki, Finland | Carpet | (Sweden) Nina Erickson | (Soviet Union) Elena Brioukhovets (Soviet Union) Eugenia Maniokova | 1–6, 4–6 |
| Loss | 6. | 2 December 1990 | Ljusdal, Sweden | Hard (i) | (West Germany) Cora Linneman | (West Germany) Stefanie Rehmke (West Germany) Kirstin Freye | 1–6, 5–7 |
| Loss | 7. | 10 November 1991 | Ljusdal, Sweden | Carpet (i) | (Germany) Cora Linneman | (Belgium) Laurence Courtois (Belgium) Nancy Feber | 2–6, 6–7^{(3–7)} |
