= 1989 Virginia Slims of Moscow =

- Date: October 8–15
- Edition: 1st
- Category: Category 2
- Prize money: $100,000
- Surface: Carpet (i)
- Location: Moscow, Soviet Union
- Venue: Olympic Stadium

Champions

Singles
- (United States) Gretchen Magers

Doubles
- (Soviet Union) Larisa Savchenko / (Soviet Union) Natasha Zvereva
Moscow Ladies Open	· 1990 →

The Virginia Slims of Moscow (Russian: Московский турнир «Вирджиния Слимз»; after the title sponsor of that year's WTA tour) was a women's tennis tournament played on indoor carpet courts at the Olympic Stadium in Moscow, Soviet Union, that was part of the Category 2 tier of the 1989 Virginia Slims World Championship Series (1989 WTA Tour).

It was held from October 8 through 15, 1989. It was the inaugural edition of the WTA tournament later known as the St. Petersburg Open and the Moscow Ladies Open.

== Finals ==
=== Singles ===
(United States) Gretchen Magers defeated (Soviet Union) Natasha Zvereva 6–3, 6–4

- It was Magers's only WTA singles title of the year and the 3rd and last of her career.

=== Doubles ===
(Soviet Union) Larisa Savchenko / (Soviet Union) Natasha Zvereva defeated (France) Nathalie Herreman / (France) Catherine Suire 6–3, 6–4

- It was Savchenko/Zvereva's 4th WTA doubles title of the year and the 6th of the pair's career.
