= Meredith McGrath =

American tennis player (born 1971)

- Country (sports): United States
- Born: April 28, 1971 (age 55) Midland, Michigan, U.S.
- Plays: Right-handed
- Prize money: $1,448,132

Singles
- Career record: 130–98
- Career titles: 3
- Highest ranking: No. 18 (July 22, 1996)

Grand Slam singles results
- Australian Open: 2R (1994)
- French Open: 2R (1995)
- Wimbledon: SF (1996)
- US Open: 2R (1993, 1994)

Doubles
- Career record: 255–84
- Career titles: 25
- Highest ranking: No. 5 (October 10, 1994)

Grand Slam doubles results
- Australian Open: F (1994)
- French Open: SF (1996)
- Wimbledon: F (1996)
- US Open: QF (1994)

Grand Slam mixed doubles results
- Australian Open: QF (1996)
- French Open: SF (1994)
- Wimbledon: QF (1994)
- US Open: W (1995)

Meredith McGrath (born April 28, 1971) is a former professional tennis player.

She was born in Midland, Michigan, and made her debut on the WTA Tour in 1988. In her eight-year professional career, Meredith achieved career-high world rankings of No. 18 in singles and No. 4 in doubles. She notched victories over such players as Martina Navratilova, Martina Hingis, Anna Kournikova, Jana Novotna, Gigi Fernandez and Mary Jo Fernandez. The pinnacle of her career came in reaching the singles semifinals and doubles finals at the 1996 Wimbledon Championships (leading 7–5, 5–2 in the doubles final before losing to Suková/Hingis). In the singles, she defeated Mana Endo, Amanda Coetzer, Nancy Feber, Katarína Studeníková and Mary Joe Fernandez before losing to Arantxa Sánchez Vicario. An injury two weeks prior to the 1996 Wimbledon Championships eventually ended her career. Meredith won the 1995 US Open Mixed-Doubles Championship (she was runner-up in 1989) and was the runner-up in the 1994 Australian Open Doubles Championship. Meredith won three WTA singles titles, Oklahoma City and Eastbourne in 1994 and Birmingham in 1996, and 25 doubles titles. Meredith was recognized by Tennis Magazine as the WTA Comeback Player of the Year as she overcame near career-ending injuries to having her most successful competitive season in 1996. In 1994, she was awarded the WTA Tour Comeback Player of the Year.

Meredith played her collegiate tennis at Stanford University where she, during her only collegiate season, earned All-American honors in both singles and doubles after having achieved year-end rankings of No. 2 in singles and No. 1 in doubles (undefeated). She had maintained No. 1 rankings in both singles and doubles during her freshman year until a loss at the NCAA Championships. Meredith turned professional after her freshman year, but returned to Stanford to earn her degree in 2000 after injuries forced her early retirement. In 1990, Meredith was awarded the Block S Award for the Most Outstanding Freshman Athlete at Stanford and with her doubles partner, Teri Whitlinger, was named the Volvo Tennis/Tennis Magazine Doubles Team of the Year.

Meredith McGrath is also a 2012 inductee into the prestigious Stanford Hall of Fame. She is also a member of the USTA Midwest Hall of Fame and the USTA NorCal Hall of Fame.

As the No. 1 ranked junior player in the world, McGrath won a total of 19 national and international junior titles. She captured the US Open junior doubles title and Wimbledon junior doubles title with Jennifer Capriati in 1989, and won the US Open junior doubles title with Kimberly Po in 1987 and 1988. Meredith was the runner-up in the 1988 Wimbledon junior singles championship. A three-time national All-American in high school, Meredith won three Michigan High School Division A State Championships. She also received six USTA National Championship Sportsmanship Awards.

== WTA career finals ==
=== Singles: 3 (3 titles) ===
Legend
| Grand Slam | 0 |
| Tier I | 0 |
| Tier II | 1 |
| Tier III | 2 |
| Tier IV & V | 0 |

| Result | W/L | Date | Tournament | Surface | Opponent | Score |
|---|---|---|---|---|---|---|
| Win | 1–0 | Feb 1994 | Oklahoma City, U.S. | Hard | (Netherlands) Brenda Schultz | 7–6^{(6)}, 7–6^{(4)} |
| Win | 2–0 | Jun 1994 | Eastbourne, England | Grass | (United States) Linda Harvey-Wild | 6–2, 6–4 |
| Win | 3–0 | Jun 1996 | Birmingham, England | Grass | (France) Nathalie Tauziat | 2–6, 6–4, 6–4 |

=== Doubles: 38 (25 titles, 13 runner-ups) ===
Legend
| Grand Slam | 0 |
| Tier I | 2 |
| Tier II | 11 |
| Tier III | 6 |
| Tier IV & V | 6 |

Titles by surface
| Hard | 13 |
| Clay | 2 |
| Grass | 0 |
| Carpet | 10 |

| Result | W/L | Date | Tournament | Surface | Partner | Opponents | Score |
|---|---|---|---|---|---|---|---|
| Loss | 1. | Jun 1989 | Birmingham, England | Grass | (United States) Pam Shriver | (Soviet Union) Larisa Savchenko (Soviet Union) Natalia Zvereva | 5–7, 7–5, 0–6 |
| Win | 2. | Nov 1989 | Nashville, U.S. | Hard | (Netherlands) Manon Bollegraf | (Soviet Union) Natalia Medvedeva (Soviet Union) Leila Meskhi | 1–6, 7–6, 7–6 |
| Win | 3. | Feb 1990 | Wichita, U.S. | Hard (i) | (Netherlands) Manon Bollegraf | (United States) Mary-Lou Daniels (United States) Wendy Prausa | 6–0, 6–2 |
| Win | 4. | Aug 1990 | Albuquerque, U.S. | Hard | (United States) Anne Smith | (United States) Mareen Louie-Harper (United States) Wendy Prausa | 7–6, 6–4 |
| Loss | 5. | Sep 1990 | Orlando, U.S. | Carpet (i) | (Netherlands) Manon Bollegraf | (Soviet Union) Larisa Savchenko (Soviet Union) Natalia Zvereva | 4–6, 1–6 |
| Win | 6. | Nov 1990 | Oakland, U.S. | Carpet (i) | (United States) Anne Smith | (South Africa) Rosalyn Fairbank-Nideffer (United States) Robin White | 2–6, 6–0, 6–4 |
| Win | 7. | Nov 1990 | Oakland, U.S. | Hard | (United States) Patty Fendick | (United States) Katrina Adams (Canada) Jill Hetherington | 6–1, 6–1 |
| Win | 8. | Feb 1991 | Oklahoma City, U.S. | Hard (i) | (United States) Anne Smith | (United States) Katrina Adams (Canada) Jill Hetherington | 6–1, 6–1 |
| Loss | 9. | Mar 1991 | Boca Raton, U.S. | Hard | (United Kingdom) Samantha Smith | (Soviet Union) Larisa Savchenko-Neiland (Soviet Union) Natalia Zvereva | 4–6, 6–7 |
| Loss | 10. | Apr 1993 | Pattaya City, Thailand | Hard | (United States) Patty Fendick | (United States) Cammy Macgregor (France) Catherine Suire | 3–6, 6–7 |
| Win | 11. | Apr 1993 | Kuala Lumpur, Malaysia | Hard | (United States) Patty Fendick | (United States) Nicole Arendt (Australia) Kristine Radford | 6–4, 7–6 |
| Win | 12. | Oct 1993 | Montpellier, France | Carpet (i) | (Germany) Claudia Porwik | (Slovakia) Janette Husárová (Belgium) Dominique Monami | 3–6, 6–2, 7–6 |
| Win | 13. | Nov 1993 | Oakland, U.S. | Carpet (i) | (United States) Patty Fendick | (South Africa) Amanda Coetzer (Argentina) Inés Gorrochategui | 6–2, 6–0 |
| Win | 14. | Jan 1994 | Sydney, Australia | Hard | (United States) Patty Fendick | (Czech Republic) Jana Novotná (Spain) Arantxa Sánchez Vicario | 6–2, 6–3 |
| Loss | 15. | Jan 1994 | Australian Open | Hard | (United States) Patty Fendick | (United States) Gigi Fernández (Belarus) Natalia Zvereva | 3–6, 6–4, 4–6 |
| Win | 16. | Feb 1994 | Oklahoma City, U.S. | Hard (i) | (United States) Patty Fendick | (United States) Katrina Adams (Netherlands) Manon Bollegraf | 7–6, 6–2 |
| Loss | 17. | Mar 1994 | Key Biscayne, U.S. | Hard | (United States) Patty Fendick | (United States) Gigi Fernández (Belarus) Natalia Zvereva | 3–6, 1–6 |
| Win | 18. | Apr 1994 | Pattaya City, Thailand | Hard | (United States) Patty Fendick | (Indonesia) Yayuk Basuki (Japan) Nana Miyagi | 7–6, 3–6, 6–3 |
| Win | 19. | Apr 1994 | Singapore | Hard | (United States) Patty Fendick | (United States) Nicole Arendt (Australia) Kristine Radford | 6–4, 6–1 |
| Win | 20. | Aug 1994 | Rogers Cup, Canada | Hard | (Spain) Arantxa Sánchez Vicario | (United States) Pam Shriver (Australia) Liz Smylie | 2–6, 6–2, 6–4 |
| Win | 21. | Aug 1994 | Schenectady, U.S. | Hard | (Latvia) Larisa Savchenko | (United States) Pam Shriver (Australia) Liz Smylie | 6–2, 6–2 |
| Win | 22. | Oct 1994 | Leipzig, Germany | Carpet (i) | (United States) Patty Fendick | (Netherlands) Manon Bollegraf (Latvia) Larisa Savchenko | 6–4, 6–4 |
| Loss | 23. | Oct 1994 | Zurich, Switzerland | Carpet (i) | (United States) Patty Fendick | (Netherlands) Manon Bollegraf (United States) Martina Navratilova | 6–7, 1–6 |
| Win | 24. | Feb 1995 | Paris, France | Hard (i) | (Latvia) Larisa Savchenko | (Netherlands) Manon Bollegraf (Australia) Rennae Stubbs | 6–4, 6–1 |
| Win | 25. | Feb 1995 | Generali Ladies Linz, Austria | Carpet (i) | (France) Nathalie Tauziat | (Croatia) Iva Majoli (Austria) Petra Schwarz | 6–1, 6–2 |
| Win | 26. | May 1995 | Edinburgh, Scotland | Clay | (Latvia) Larisa Savchenko | (Netherlands) Manon Bollegraf (Australia) Rennae Stubbs | 6–2, 7–6 |
| Win | 27. | Sep 1995 | Moscow, Russia | Carpet (i) | (Latvia) Larisa Savchenko | (Russia) Anna Kournikova (Poland) Aleksandra Olsza | 6–1, 6–1 |
| Win | 28. | Oct 1995 | Leipzig, Germany | Carpet (i) | (Latvia) Larisa Savchenko | (Netherlands) Brenda Schultz-McCarthy (Netherlands) Caroline Vis | 6–4, 6–4 |
| Loss | 29. | Oct 1995 | Filderstadt, Germany | Hard (i) | (Latvia) Larisa Savchenko | (United States) Gigi Fernández (Belarus) Natalia Zvereva | 7–5, 1–6, 4–6 |
| Win | 30. | Oct 1995 | Brighton, England | Carpet (i) | (Latvia) Larisa Savchenko | (United States) Lori McNeil (Czech Republic) Helena Suková | 7–5, 6–1 |
| Loss | 31. | Nov 1995 | Philadelphia, U.S. | Carpet (i) | (Latvia) Larisa Savchenko | (United States) Lori McNeil (Czech Republic) Helena Suková | 6–4, 3–6, 4–6 |
| Win | 32. | Feb 1996 | Essen, Germany | Carpet (i) | (Latvia) Larisa Savchenko | (United States) Lori McNeil (Czech Republic) Helena Suková | 6–4, 3–6, 4–6 |
| Win | 33. | Mar 1996 | Generali Ladies Linz, Austria | Carpet (i) | (Netherlands) Manon Bollegraf | (Australia) Rennae Stubbs (Czech Republic) Helena Suková | 6–4, 6–4 |
| Loss | 34. | Mar 1996 | Key Biscayne, U.S. | Hard | (Latvia) Larisa Savchenko | (Czech Republic) Jana Novotná (Spain) Arantxa Sánchez Vicario | 4–6, 4–6 |
| Loss | 35. | Apr 1996 | Amelia Island, U.S. | Clay | (Latvia) Larisa Savchenko | (United States) Chanda Rubin (Spain) Arantxa Sánchez Vicario | 4–6, 4–6 |
| Win | 36. | May 1996 | Berlin, Germany | Clay | (Latvia) Larisa Savchenko | (Switzerland) Martina Hingis (Czech Republic) Helena Suková | 6–1, 5–7, 7–6 |
| Loss | 37. | Jul 1996 | Wimbledon, England | Grass | (Latvia) Larisa Savchenko | (Switzerland) Martina Hingis (Czech Republic) Helena Suková | 7–5, 5–7, 1–6 |
| Loss | 38. | Jan 1998 | Sydney, Australia | Hard | (United States) Katrina Adams | (Switzerland) Martina Hingis (Czech Republic) Helena Suková | 1–6, 2–6 |

=== Mixed doubles: 2 (1 title, 1 runner-up) ===
| Result | No. | Date | Tournament | Surface | Partner | Opponents | Score |
|---|---|---|---|---|---|---|---|
| Loss | 1. | Sep 1989 | US Open | Hard | (United States) Rick Leach | (United States) Shelby Cannon (United States) Robin White | 6–3, 2–6, 5–7 |
| Win | 2. | Sept 1995 | US Open | Hard | (United States) Matt Lucena | (Czech Republic) Cyril Suk (United States) Gigi Fernández | 6–4, 6–4 |

== ITF finals ==
=== Singles (1–3) ===
$75,000 tournaments
$25,000 tournaments
$10,000 tournaments

| Result | No. | Date | Tournament | Surface | Opponent | Score |
|---|---|---|---|---|---|---|
| Win | 1. | 18 July 1988 | Fayetteville, United States | Hard | (United States) Tammy Whittington | 6–0, 6–3 |
| Loss | 2. | 6 February 1989 | Midland, United States | Hard | (United States) Shaun Stafford | 3–6, 3–6 |
| Loss | 3. | 28 January 1991 | Midland, United States | Hard | (Canada) Helen Kelesi | 2–6, 2–6 |
| Loss | 4. | 6 February 1994 | Midland, United States | Hard | (Netherlands) Brenda Schultz-McCarthy | 2–6, 0–1 ret. |

=== Doubles (2–3) ===
| Result | No. | Date | Tournament | Surface | Partner | Opponents | Score |
|---|---|---|---|---|---|---|---|
| Loss | 1. | 6 February 1989 | Midland, United States | Hard | (United States) Shaun Stafford | (South Korea) Kim Il-soon (South Korea) Lee Jeong-myung | 6–2, 2–6, 4–6 |
| Loss | 2. | 28 January 1991 | Midland, United States | Hard | (United States) Anne Smith | (United States) Katrina Adams (Canada) Helen Kelesi | 5–7, 5–7 |
| Win | 3. | 27 January 1992 | Midland, United States | Hard | (Netherlands) Manon Bollegraf | (Canada) Helen Kelesi (Netherlands) Caroline Vis | 6–3, 6–1 |
| Win | 4. | 1 February 1993 | Midland, United States | Hard | (United States) Patty Fendick | (United States) Jean Ceniza (Canada) Caroline Delisle | 7–6^{(5)}, 6–2 |
| Loss | 5. | 27 October 1997 | Austin, United States | Hard | (United States) Debbie Graham | (South Korea) Park Sung-hee (Japan) Miho Saeki | 4–6, 7–5, 2–6 |

== Grand Slam doubles performance timeline ==
Key
| W | F | SF | QF | #R | RR | Q# | DNQ | A | NH |

(W) winner; (F) finalist; (SF) semifinalist; (QF) quarterfinalist; (#R) rounds 4, 3, 2, 1; (RR) round-robin stage; (Q#) qualification round; (DNQ) did not qualify; (A) absent; (NH) not held; (SR) strike rate (events won / competed); (W–L) win–loss record.

| Tournament | 1988 | 1989 | 1990 | 1991 | 1992 | 1993 | 1994 | 1995 | 1996 | 1997 | 1998 | SR | W–L |
|---|---|---|---|---|---|---|---|---|---|---|---|---|---|
| Australian Open | A | A | A | A | A | A | F | 3R | SF | A | 1R | 0 / 4 | 11–4 |
| French Open | A | A | A | QF | A | 1R | 3R | 3R | SF | A | A | 0 / 5 | 11–5 |
| Wimbledon | A | 1R | 2R | A | A | 2R | 3R | SF | F | A | A | 0 / 6 | 13–6 |
| US Open | 1R | 2R | 1R | A | A | 3R | QF | 3R | A | A | A | 0 / 6 | 8–6 |
| Win–loss | 0–1 | 1–2 | 1–2 | 3–1 | 0–0 | 3–3 | 12–4 | 10–4 | 13–3 | 0–0 | 0–1 | 0 / 21 | 43–21 |
