= Irina Sukhova =

Ukrainian tennis player

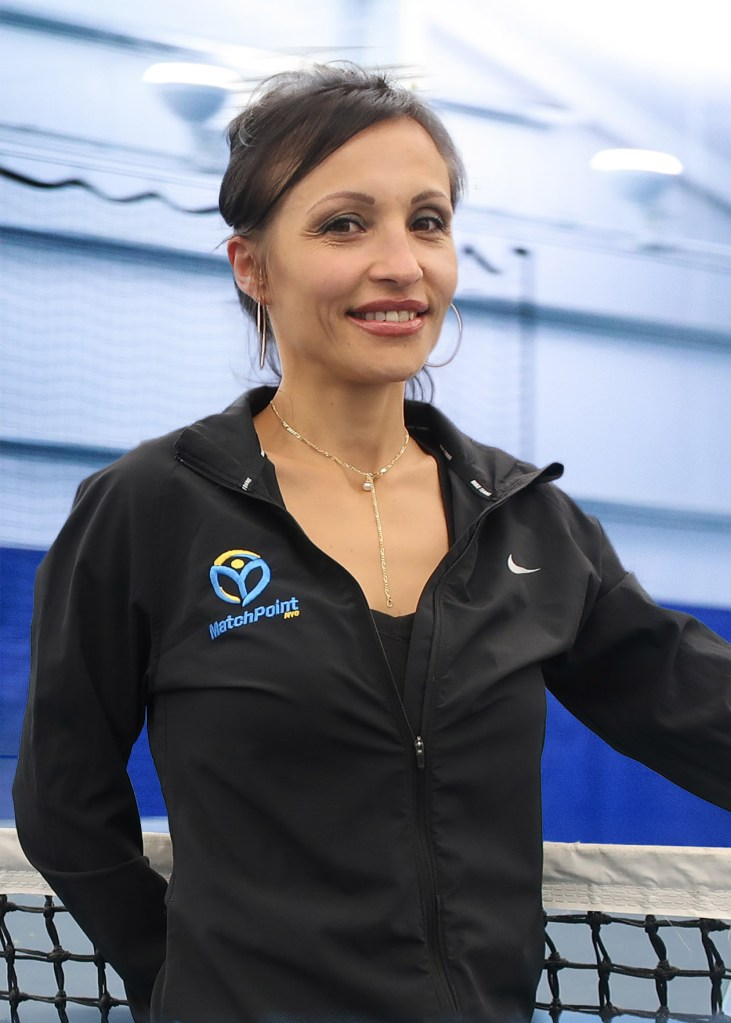
Irina Sukhova

Irina Sukhova (Ukrainian: Ірина Сухова, born 9 February 1974) is a former tennis player from Ukraine.

Sukhova made her WTA Tour main-draw debut at the Moscow Ladies Open, in the doubles event partnering Tatiana Panova.

== ITF Circuit finals ==
Legend
$100,000 tournaments
$75,000 tournaments
$50,000 tournaments
$25,000 tournaments
$10,000 tournaments

=== Singles (2–2) ===
Result	No.	Date	Tournament	Surface	Opponent	Score
Loss	1.	7 April 1991	ITF Šibenik, Yugoslavia	Clay	(Bulgaria) Lubomira Bacheva	1–6, 3–6
Win	2.	2 September 1991	ITF Burgas, Bulgaria	Hard	(Israel) Nelly Barkan	6–3, 2–6, 6–3
Loss	3.	18 May 1992	ITF Tortosa, Spain	Clay	(Argentina) Paola Suárez	6–3, 4–6, 1–6
Win	4.	5 April 1993	ITF Bangkok, Thailand	Hard	(Thailand) Suvimol Duangchan	6–3, 6–1

=== Doubles (4–5) ===
Result	No.	Date	Tournament	Surface	Partner	Opponents	Score
Loss	1.	15 October 1990	ITF Supetar, Yugoslavia	Clay	(Soviet Union) Tatiana Ignatieva	(Socialist Federal Republic of Yugoslavia) Ivona Horvat (Czechoslovakia) Eva Martincová	3–6, 3–6
Loss	2.	1 April 1991	ITF Šibenik, Yugoslavia	Clay	(Soviet Union) Elena Makarova	(Czechoslovakia) Zdeňka Málková (Czechoslovakia) Janette Husárová	1–6, 5–7
Loss	3.	1 July 1991	ITF Dubrovnik, Yugoslavia	Clay	(Soviet Union) Elena Pogorelova	(Bulgaria) Lubomira Bacheva (Socialist Federal Republic of Yugoslavia) Ivona Horvat	7–5, 3–6, 3–6
Loss	4.	9 September 1991	ITF Haskovo, Bulgaria	Clay	(Soviet Union) Elena Pogorelova	(Bulgaria) Lubomira Bacheva (Bulgaria) Galia Angelova	6–7, 7–6, 1–6
Win	5.	27 April 1992	ITF Lerida, Spain	Clay	(Bulgaria) Svetlana Krivencheva	(Canada) Martina Crha (United States) Lisa Pugliese	6–1, 6–2
Win	6.	4 May 1992	ITF Balaguer, Spain	Clay	(Bulgaria) Svetlana Krivencheva	(Argentina) Paola Suárez (Argentina) Pamela Zingman	4–6, 6–4, 6–4
Win	7.	3 August 1992	ITF Paderborn, Germany	Clay	(Moldova) Svetlana Komleva	(Germany) Nadja Beik (Germany) Anke Marchl	2–6, 6–4, 6–2
Win	8.	5 April 1993	ITF Bangkok, Thailand	Hard	(Thailand) Suvimol Duangchan	(United States) Amy deLone (Australia) Kate McDonald	6–3, 6–2
Loss	9.	10 April 1995	ITF Plovdiv, Bulgaria	Clay	(Moldova) Svetlana Komleva	(Bulgaria) Teodora Nedeva (Bulgaria) Antoaneta Pandjerova	5–7, 1–6

== Junior Grand Slam finals ==
=== Girls' doubles ===
Result	Year	Championship	Surface	Partner	Opponents	Score
Loss	1990	French Open	Clay	(Soviet Union) Tatiana Ignatieva	(Romania) Ruxandra Dragomir (Romania) Irina Spîrlea	3–6, 1–6
