= Caroline Vis =

Dutch tennis player

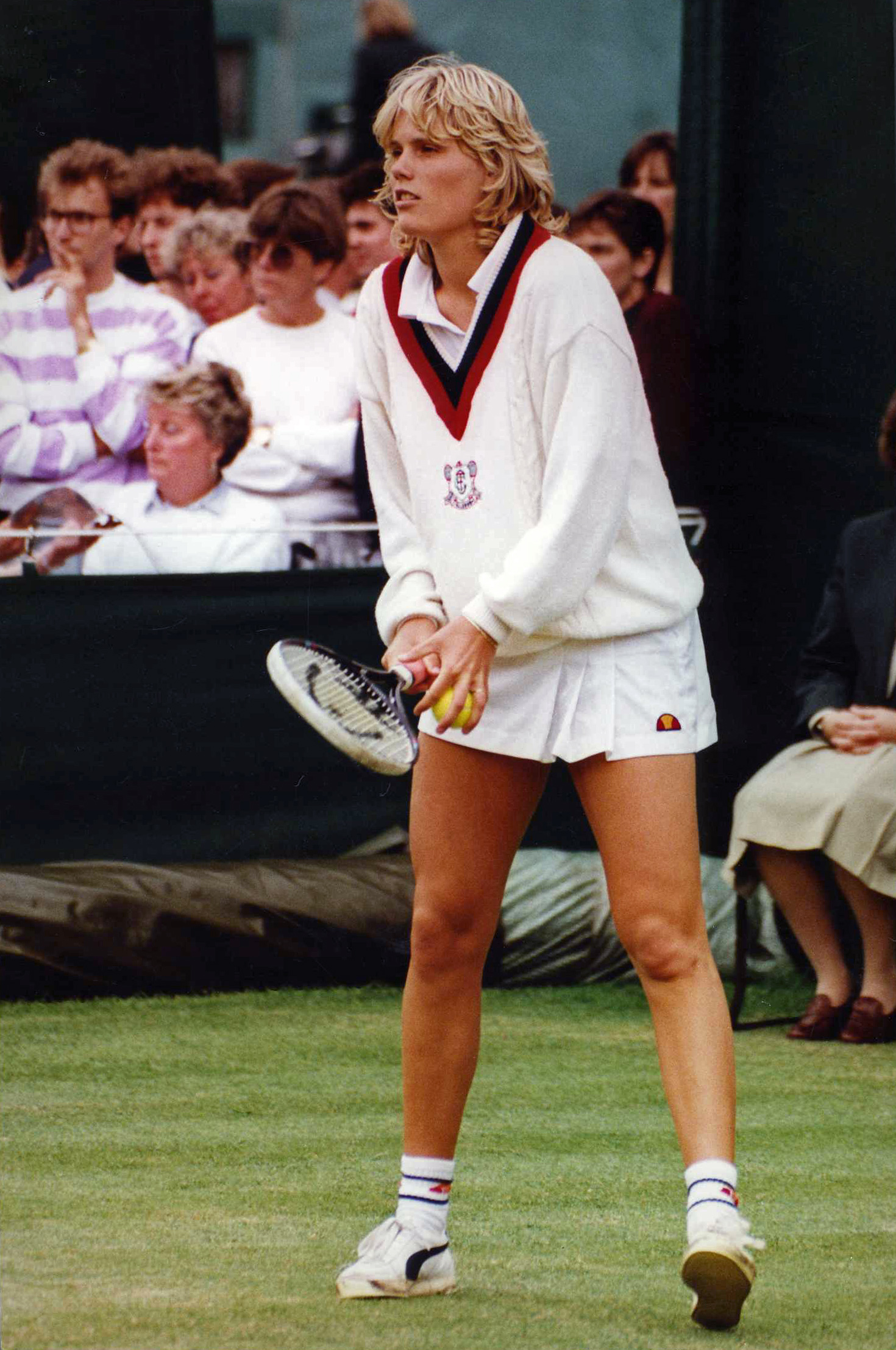
- Country (sports): Netherlands
- Residence: The Hague, Netherlands
- Born: 4 March 1970 (age 55) Vlaardingen, Netherlands
- Height: 1.80 m (5 ft 11 in)
- Turned pro: 1989
- Retired: 2006
- Plays: Right-handed (two-handed backhand)
- Prize money: US$ 1,086,821

Singles
- Career record: 125–131
- Career titles: 0
- Highest ranking: No. 111 (9 May 1994)

Grand Slam singles results
- Australian Open: 1R (1994, 1995)
- French Open: 1R (1994)
- Wimbledon: 1R (1994)

Doubles
- Career record: 335–290
- Career titles: 9 WTA, 5 ITF
- Highest ranking: No. 9 (3 August 1998)

Caroline Vis (born 4 March 1970) is a former tennis player from the Netherlands.

Vis turned professional in 1989. A doubles specialist, Vis won nine titles on the WTA Tour during her career. She reached the mixed-doubles final at the 1991 French Open, playing with compatriot Paul Haarhuis. Her career-high doubles ranking is No. 9 in the world, which she reached in August 1998. Vis retired from tennis in 2006.

== Grand Slam finals ==
=== Mixed doubles: 1 (runner-up) ===
Result	Year	Championship	Surface	Partner	Opponents	Score
Loss	1991	French Open	Clay	(Netherlands) Paul Haarhuis	(Czechoslovakia) Helena Suková (Czechoslovakia) Cyril Suk	6–3, 4–6, 1–6

== WTA Tour finals ==
=== Doubles: 26 (9 titles, 17 runner-ups) ===
Legend (titles)
Grand Slam (0)
Tier I (1)
Tier II (4)
Tier III (2)
Tier IV-V (2)

Result	No.	Date	Tournament	Surface	Partner	Opponents	Score
Loss	1.	Nov 1990	Nashville, United States	Hard (i)	(Netherlands) Brenda Schultz	(United States) Kathy Jordan (Soviet Union) Larisa Neiland	1–6, 2–6
Loss	2.	Nov 1991	Nashville, United States	Hard(i)	(Indonesia) Yayuk Basuki	(United States) Sandy Collins (South Africa) Elna Reinach	7–5, 4–6, 6–7
Win	1.	May 1992	Waregem, Belgium	Clay	(Netherlands) Manon Bollegraf	(Ukraine) Elena Bryukhovets (Czech Republic) Petra Langrová	6–4, 6–3
Loss	3.	Jul 1993	Prague, Czech Republic	Hard	(Italy) Laura Golarsa	(Argentina) Inés Gorrochategui (Argentina) Patricia Tarabini	2–6, 1–6
Win	2.	Oct 1993	Budapest, Hungary	Carpet (i)	(Argentina) Inés Gorrochategui	(Italy) Sandra Cecchini (Argentina) Patricia Tarabini	6–1, 6–3
Loss	4.	May 1994	Strasbourg, France	Clay	(Argentina) Patricia Tarabini	(United States) Lori McNeil (Australia) Rennae Stubbs	3–6, 6–3, 2–6
Loss	5.	Sep 1994	Moscow, Russia	Carpet (i)	(Italy) Laura Golarsa	(Russia) Elena Makarova (Russia) Eugenia Maniokova	6–7, 4–6
Loss	6.	Feb 1995	Auckland, New Zealand	Hard	(Italy) Laura Golarsa	(Canada) Jill Hetherington (South Africa) Elna Reinach	6–7, 2–6
Loss	7.	Oct 1995	Leipzig, Germany	Carpet (i)	(Netherlands) Brenda Schultz	(United States) Meredith McGrath (Latvia) Larisa Neiland	4–6, 4–6
Loss	8.	Oct 1995	Zürich, Switzerland	Hard (i)	(United States) Chanda Rubin	(United States) Nicole Arendt (Netherlands) Manon Bollegraf	4–6, 6–7^{(4–7)}, 4–6
Win	3.	Aug 1997	Los Angeles, United States	Hard	(Indonesia) Yayuk Basuki	(Latvia) Larisa Neiland (Czech Republic) Helena Suková	7–6^{(9–7)}, 6–3
Win	4.	Aug 1997	Toronto, Canada	Hard	(Indonesia) Yayuk Basuki	(United States) Nicole Arendt (Netherlands) Manon Bollegraf	3–6, 7–5, 6–4
Loss	9.	Nov 1997	Moscow, Russia	Carpet(i)	(Indonesia) Yayuk Basuki	(Spain) Arantxa Sánchez Vicario (Belarus) Natasha Zvereva	3–5 default
Loss	10.	Feb 1998	Hanover, Germany	Carpet	(Russia) Elena Likhovtseva	(United States) Lisa Raymond (Australia) Rennae Stubbs	6–1, 6–7^{(4–7)}, 6–3
Loss	11.	May 1998	Strasbourg, France	Clay	(Indonesia) Yayuk Basuki	(France) Alexandra Fusai (France) Nathalie Tauziat	4–6, 3–6
Loss	12.	Aug 1998	Montreal, Canada	Hard	(Indonesia) Yayuk Basuki	(Switzerland) Martina Hingis (Czech Republic) Jana Novotná	3–6, 4–6
Win	5.	Feb 1999	Paris, France	Carpet (i)	(Romania) Irina Spîrlea	(Russia) Elena Likhovtseva (Japan) Ai Sugiyama	7–5, 3–6, 6–3
Loss	13.	Apr 1999	Cairo, Egypt	Clay	(Romania) Irina Spîrlea	(Belgium) Laurence Courtois (Spain) Arantxa Sánchez Vicario	7–5, 1–6, 6–7^{(7–9)}
Win	6.	Sep 1999	Luxembourg, Luxembourg	Carpet (i)	(Romania) Irina Spîrlea	(Slovenia) Tina Križan (Slovenia) Katarina Srebotnik	6–1, 6–2
Win	7.	Oct 1999	Linz, Austria	Carpet (i)	(Romania) Irina Spîrlea	(Slovenia) Tina Križan (Latvia) Larisa Neiland	6–4, 6–3
Win	8.	Nov 2000	Pattaya, Thailand	Hard	(Indonesia) Yayuk Basuki	(Slovenia) Tina Križan (Slovenia) Katarina Srebotnik	6–3, 6–3
Win	9.	Feb 2001	Dubai, United Arab Emirates	Hard	(Indonesia) Yayuk Basuki	(Sweden) Åsa Carlsson (Slovakia) Karina Habšudová	6–0, 4–6, 6–2
Loss	14.	Jul 2001	Stanford, United States	Hard	(United States) Nicole Arendt	(Chinese Taipei) Janet Lee (Indonesia) Wynne Prakusya	6–3, 3–6, 3–6
Loss	15.	Aug 2001	Manhattan Beach, United States	Hard	(United States) Nicole Arendt	(United States) Kimberly Po-Messerli (France) Nathalie Tauziat	3–6, 5–7
Loss	16.	Feb 2002	Doha, Qatar	Hard	(France) Alexandra Fusai	(Slovakia) Janette Husárová (Spain) Arantxa Sánchez Vicario	3–6, 3–6
Loss	17.	Apr 2002	Charleston, United States	Clay	(France) Alexandra Fusai	(United States) Lisa Raymond (Australia) Rennae Stubbs	4–6, 6–3, 6–7^{(4)}

== ITF finals ==
$25,000 tournaments
$10,000 tournaments

=== Singles (0–1) ===
Result	No.	Date	Location	Surface	Opponent	Score
Loss	1.	15 May 1989	London, United Kingdom	Clay	(Japan) Kimiko Date	3–6, 0–6

=== Doubles (5–5) ===
Result	No.	Date	Location	Surface	Partner	Opponents	Score
Win	1.	20 July 1987	Amersfoort, Netherlands	Clay	(Netherlands) Gaby Coorengel	(Netherlands) Yvonne der Kinderen (Netherlands) Inge Dolman	6–3, 3–6, 6–1
Win	2.	18 July 1988	Amersfoort, Netherlands	Clay	(Netherlands) Gaby Coorengel	(Netherlands) Pascale Druyts (Netherlands) Yvonne Schreurs	6–3, 6–2
Win	3.	27 February 1989	Jaffa, Israel	Hard	(Netherlands) Marianne van der Torre	(United Kingdom) Caroline Billingham (Poland) Sylvia Czopek	3–6, 6–1, 6–3
Win	4.	6 March 1989	Ashkelon, Israel	Hard	(Netherlands) Marianne van der Torre	(Denmark) Sofie Albinus (Denmark) Lone Vandborg	6–1, 6–1
Win	5.	20 March 1989	Ramat HaSharon, Israel	Hard	(Netherlands) Marianne van der Torre	(Sweden) Malin Nilsson (Sweden) Eva Lena Olsson	6–2, 6–2
Loss	1.	24 April 1989	Sutton, United Kingdom	Clay	(West Germany) Aurelia Gheorghe	(Japan) Kimiko Date (Japan) Shiho Okada	3–6, 2–6
Loss	2.	6 November 1989	Swindon, United Kingdom	Carpet (i)	(United Kingdom) Julie Salmon	(Soviet Union) Elena Brioukhovets (Soviet Union) Eugenia Maniokova	3–6, 4–6
Loss	3.	14 May 1990	Cascais, Portugal	Clay	(Netherlands) Simone Schilder	(Spain) Eva Bes (Spain) Virginia Ruano Pascual	6–3, 2–6, 1–6
Loss	4.	1 October 1990	York, United States	Hard (i)	(Netherlands) Simone Schilder	(United States) Louise Allen (France) Sophie Amiach	6–7, 4–6
Loss	5.	27 January 1992	Midland, United States	Clay	(Canada) Helen Kelesi	(Netherlands) Manon Bollegraf (United States) Meredith McGrath	3–6, 1–6
