= Isabelle Demongeot =

French tennis player

- Country (sports): France
- Born: 18 September 1966 (age 60) Gassin, France
- Height: 1.69 m (5 ft 6 1/2 in)
- Turned pro: 1983
- Retired: 1996
- Plays: Right-handed
- Prize money: $804,884

Singles
- Career record: 249–221
- Career titles: 1 WTA, 4 ITF
- Highest ranking: No. 35 (23 May 1988)

Grand Slam singles results
- Australian Open: 3R (1990, 1993)
- French Open: 3R (1988)
- Wimbledon: 4R (1986)
- US Open: 3R (1987, 1994)

Doubles
- Career record: 251–187
- Career titles: 9 WTA, 4 ITF
- Highest ranking: No. 20 (8 May 1989)

Grand Slam doubles results
- Australian Open: 3R (1990, 1992)
- French Open: QF (1987, 1992)
- Wimbledon: 3R (1985, 1988, 1992, 1995)
- US Open: 3R (1989, 1992)

Isabelle Demongeot (born 18 September 1966) is a former professional tennis player from France, who turned professional on 1 May 1983. She lived in Saint-Tropez in the French Riviera in the early stages of her career and later settled nearby in Gassin.

Demongeot won her only WTA Tour singles title in Purchase in New York state in 1991. She achieved her best Grand Slam singles performance by reaching the fourth round of Wimbledon in 1986. She won a total of nine WTA Tour doubles titles. Her best Grand Slam doubles performance was reaching the French Open quarter-finals with Nathalie Tauziat of France in 1987 and 1992. She also represented her country from 1985 to 1993 in the Federation/Fed Cup and in the 1988 and 1992 Olympic Games. She retired from the WTA Tour in 1996.

In her 2007 book, Service volé, she accused her coach, Régis de Camaret, of rape and sexual abuse. She would later be joined by several former pupils who made similar allegations. Although her own case was time-barred, she acted as a witness in the 2012 trial of de Camaret for offences against two young players. The 70-year-old coach was sentenced to eight years in prison, increased to ten years on appeal in 2014.

== WTA Tour finals ==
=== Singles 1 (1–0) ===
Legend
Grand Slam tournaments (0/0)
WTA Championships (0/0)
Virginia Slims (0/0)
Tier I (0/0)
Tier II (0/0)
Tier III (0/0)
Tier IV & V (1/0)

Result	W/L	Date	Tournament	Surface	Opponent	Score
Win	1–0	July 1991	Westchester, US	Hard	(United States) Lori McNeil	6–4, 6–4

=== Doubles 13 (9–4) ===
Legend
Grand Slam tournaments (0/0)
WTA Championships (0/0)
Virginia Slims (1/0)
Tier I (1/0)
Tier II (0/0)
Tier III (1/1)
Tier IV & V (6/3)

Result	W/L	Date	Tournament	Surface	Partner	Opponents	Score
Win	1–0	Sep 1987	Paris, France	Clay	(France) Nathalie Tauziat	(Italy) Sandra Cecchini (Socialist Federal Republic of Yugoslavia) Sabrina Goleš	1–6, 6–3, 6–3
Win	2–0	May 1988	Berlin, West Germany	Clay	(France) Nathalie Tauziat	(Germany) Claudia Kohde-Kilsch (Czech Republic) Helena Suková	6–2, 4–6, 6–4
Loss	2–1	Jul 1988	Nice, France	Clay	(France) Nathalie Tauziat	(France) Catherine Suire (France) Catherine Tanvier	6–4, 4–6, 6–2
Win	3–1	Oct 1988	Zürich, Switzerland	Carpet (i)	(France) Nathalie Tauziat	(West Germany) Claudia Kohde-Kilsch (Czechoslovakia) Helena Suková	6–3, 6–3
Loss	3–2	Oct 1988	Brighton, UK	Carpet (i)	(France) Nathalie Tauziat	(United States) Lori McNeil (United States) Betsy Nagelsen	7–6^{(7–5)}, 2–6, 7–6^{(7–4)}
Win	4–2	May 1989	Hamburg, West Germany	Clay	(France) Nathalie Tauziat	(Czechoslovakia) Jana Novotná (Czechoslovakia) Helena Suková	walkover
Win	5–2	Aug 1991	Albuquerque, US	Hard	(United States) Katrina Adams	(South Africa) Lise Gregory (United States) Peanut Louie Harper	6–7^{(2–7)}, 6–4, 6–3
Loss	5–3	Sep 1991	St. Petersburg, Russia	Carpet (i)	(United Kingdom) Jo Durie	(Soviet Union) Elena Brioukhovets (Soviet Union) Natalia Medvedeva	7–5, 6–3
Win	6–3	Sep 1991	Leipzig, Germany	Carpet (i)	(Netherlands) Manon Bollegraf	(Canada) Jill Hetherington (United States) Kathy Rinaldi-Stunkel	6–4, 6–3
Win	7–3	Apr 1992	Pattaya, Thailand	Hard	(Ukraine) Natalia Medvedeva	(France) Pascale Paradis (France) Sandrine Testud	6–1, 6–1
Win	8–3	Apr 1992	Kuala Lumpur, Malaysia	Hard	(Ukraine) Natalia Medvedeva	(Japan) Rika Hiraki (Czechoslovakia) Petra Langrová	2–6, 6–4, 6–1
Win	9–3	Feb 1993	Auckland, New Zealand	Hard	(South Africa) Elna Reinach	(Canada) Jill Hetherington (United States) Kathy Rinaldi	6–2, 6–4
Loss	9–4	Apr 1994	Taranto, Italy	Clay	(Italy) Sandra Cecchini	(Romania) Irina Spîrlea (France) Noëlle van Lottum	6–3, 2–6, 6–1

== ITF finals ==
=== Singles (4-4) ===
$100,000 tournaments
$75,000 tournaments
$50,000 tournaments
$25,000 tournaments
$10,000 tournaments

Result	No.	Date	Tournament	Surface	Opponent	Score
Win	1.	17 October 1983	Ashkelon, Israel	Hard	(Israel) Rafeket Benjamini	6–0, 6–0
Win	2.	23 January 1984	Key Biscayne, United States	Hard	(Sweden) Carin Anderholm	7–5, 6–3
Win	3.	20 August 1984	Rheda-Wiedenbrück, Germany	Clay	(Socialist Federal Republic of Yugoslavia) Renata Šašak	7–6, 7–5
Win	4.	31 December 1984	Chicago, United States	Hard	(United States) Kirsten Dreyer	1–6, 6–2, 6–4
Loss	5.	15 July 1991	Evansville, United States	Hard	(United States) Kimberly Po	6–2, 4–6, 1–6
Loss	6.	9 December 1991	Val-d'Oise, France	Hard	(France) Nathalie Tauziat	6–3, 3–6, 1–6
Loss	7.	12 December 1994	Cergy, France	Hard (i)	(Poland) Katarzyna Nowak	3–6, 3–6
Loss	8.	3 March 1996	Southampton, United Kingdom	Carpet (i)	(Bulgaria) Elena Pampoulova	3–6, 6–4, 4–6

=== Doubles (4-4) ===
Result	No.	Date	Tournament	Surface	Partner	Opponents	Score
Loss	1.	11 June 1984	Lyon, France	Clay	(France) Nathalie Tauziat	(Argentina) Mercedes Paz (United States) Ronni Reis	6–1, 3–6, 3–6
Loss	2.	31 December 1984	Chicago, United States	Hard	(France) Nathalie Tauziat	(United States) Lynn Lewis (Canada) Wendy Barlow	6–4, 6–7, 5–7
Win	3.	21 January 1985	San Antonio, United States	Hard	(France) Nathalie Tauziat	(Sweden) Elisabeth Ekblom (Netherlands) Marianne van der Torre	6–3, 6–4
Win	4.	30 March 1987	Limoges, France	Clay	(France) Nathalie Tauziat	(Switzerland) Céline Cohen (Switzerland) Eva Krapl	7–5, 6–2
Win	5.	7 December 1992	Val-d'Oise, France	Hard	(France) Catherine Suire	(Belgium) Sabine Appelmans (France) Julie Halard-Decugis	7–5, 6–4
Loss	6.	29 March 1993	Moulins, France	Hard	(France) Catherine Suire	(Latvia) Agnese Blumberga (Czech Republic) Jana Pospíšilová	6–3, 2–6, 4–6
Loss	7.	6 December 1993	Val-d'Oise, France	Hard	(France) Catherine Suire	(Poland) Magdalena Feistel (Russia) Elena Makarova	6–2, 3–6, 4–6
Win	8.	10 April 1994	Limoges, France	Clay	(Sweden) Maria Strandlund	(France) Angelique Olivier (Austria) Heidi Sprung	6–2, 6–2
