= Gretchen Rush =

American tennis player

- Full name: Gretchen Anne Rush
- Country (sports): United States
- Born: February 7, 1964 (age 62) Pittsburgh, Pennsylvania, USA
- Height: 5 ft 7 in (1.70 m)
- Turned pro: 1986
- Plays: Right-handed (two-handed backhand)
- College: Trinity
- Prize money: US$ 762,368

Singles
- Career record: 191–139
- Career titles: 3
- Highest ranking: No. 22 (March 12, 1990)

Grand Slam singles results
- Australian Open: 2R (1987, 1991)
- French Open: QF (1983)
- Wimbledon: QF (1989)
- US Open: QF (1982)

Doubles
- Career record: 193–141
- Highest ranking: No. 18 (October 29, 1990)

Grand Slam doubles results
- Australian Open: QF (1988)
- French Open: 3R (1989, 1990)
- Wimbledon: QF (1986, 1991, 1992)

Grand Slam mixed doubles results
- French Open: 3R (1986, 1987)
- Wimbledon: F (1988)
Medal record
Representing United States
Summer Universiade
Silver medal – second place	1985 Kobe	Women's singles
Bronze medal – third place	1985 Kobe	Women's doubles

Gretchen Anne Rush (born February 7, 1964), also known by her married name Gretchen Magers, is a former professional tennis player from the United States who was active in the 1980s and early 1990s.

Rush played tennis at Trinity University in San Antonio, Texas from 1983 to 1986, where she was a four-time All-American. While at Trinity, she won the Broderick Award (now the Honda Sports Award) as the nation's top collegiate tennis player in 1986.

During her career, Rush reached the singles quarter-finals at Wimbledon, the US Open and the French Open. She won three top-level singles titles: Auckland in 1987, Schenectady in 1988, and Moscow in 1989, and she reached a career-high singles ranking of no. 22 on March 12, 1990. She was runner-up in the 1988 mixed doubles at Wimbledon, partnering Kelly Jones.

Rush retired from the professional tour in 1992, but has continued to play in seniors events.

In 2016, she was inducted into the Women's Collegiate Tennis Hall of Fame.

== WTA Tour finals ==
=== Singles 4 (3–1) ===
Legend
Grand Slam	0
WTA Championships	0
Tier I	0
Tier II	0
Tier III	0
Tier IV & V	0

Result	W–L	Date	Tournament	Surface	Opponent	Score
Win	1–0	Feb 1987	Auckland, New Zealand	Hard	(United States) Terry Phelps	6–2, 6–3
Win	2–0	Jul 1988	Schenectady, New York, US	Hard	(United States) Terry Phelps	7–6, 6–4
Win	3–0	Oct 1989	Moscow, USSR	Hard	(Soviet Union) Natasha Zvereva	6–3, 6–4
Loss	3–1	Jun 1990	Eastbourne, England	Grass	(United States) Martina Navratilova	0–6, 2–6

=== Doubles 14 (4–10) ===
Legend
Grand Slam	0
WTA Championships	0
Tier I	0
Tier II	0
Tier III	2
Tier IV & V	0

Titles by surface
Hard	1
Clay	0
Grass	1
Carpet	2

Result	W–L	Date	Tournament	Surface	Partner	Opponents	Score
Loss	0–1	Jul 1986	Newport, Rhode Island, US	Grass	(United States) Cammy MacGregor	(United States) Terry Holladay (United States) Heather Ludloff	1–6, 7–6, 3–6
Loss	0–2	Feb 1987	Auckland, New Zealand	Hard	(Australia) Elizabeth Minter	(United States) Anna-Maria Fernandez (New Zealand) Julie Richardson	4–6, 5–7
Loss	0–3	Feb 1988	San Antonio, US	Hard	(South Africa) Rosalyn Fairbank	(United States) Lori McNeil (Czechoslovakia) Helena Suková	3–6, 7–6^{(7–5)}, 2–6
Loss	0–4	Mar 1989	Indian Wells, US	Hard	(South Africa) Rosalyn Fairbank	(Australia) Hana Mandlíková (United States) Pam Shriver	3–6, 7–6, 3–6
Loss	0–5	May 1989	Berlin, Germany	Clay	(South Africa) Lise Gregory	(Australia) Liz Smylie (Australia) Janine Tremelling	7–5, 3–6, 2–6
Loss	0–6	May 1989	Strasbourg, France	Clay	(South Africa) Lise Gregory	(Argentina) Mercedes Paz (Austria) Judith Wiesner	3–6, 3–6
Loss	0–7	Aug 1989	San Diego, California, US	Hard	(United States) Robin White	(United States) Elise Burgin (South Africa) Rosalyn Fairbank	6–4, 3–6, 3–6
Loss	0–8	Jun 1990	Birmingham, England	Grass	(South Africa) Lise Gregory	(Soviet Union) Larisa Savchenko (Soviet Union) Natalia Zvereva	6–3, 3–6, 3–6
Win	1–8	Jul 1990	Newport, Rhode Island, US	Grass	(South Africa) Lise Gregory	(United States) Patty Fendick (United States) Anne Smith	7–6, 6–1
Win	2–8	Sep 1990	Leipzig, Germany	Carpet	(South Africa) Lise Gregory	(Netherlands) Manon Bollegraf (United Kingdom) Jo Durie	6–2, 4–6, 6–3
Win	3–8	Oct 1990	Moscow, Russia	Carpet	(United States) Robin White	(Soviet Union) Elena Brioukhovets (Soviet Union) Eugenia Maniokova	6–2, 6–4
Win	4–8	Feb 1991	Aurora, Colorado, US	Hard	(South Africa) Lise Gregory	(United States) Patty Fendick (United States) Lori McNeil	6–4, 6–4
Loss	4–9	Aug 1991	Manhattan Beach, US	Hard	(United States) Robin White	(Soviet Union) Larisa Savchenko (Soviet Union) Natalia Zvereva	1–6, 6–2, 2–6
Loss	4–10	Nov 1992	Oakland, California, US	Carpet	(South Africa) Rosalyn Fairbank	(United States) Gigi Fernández (Commonwealth of Independent States) Natalia Zvereva	6–3, 2–6, 4–6

=== Mixed doubles 1 (0–1) ===
Legend
Grand Slam	0
WTA Championships	0
Tier I	0
Tier II	0
Tier III	0
Tier IV & V	0

Titles by surface
Hard	0
Clay	0
Grass	0
Carpet	0

Result	W-L	Date	Tournament	Surface	Partner	Opponents	Score
Loss	0–1	Jul 1988	Wimbledon, England	Grass	(United States) Kelly Jones	(United States) Sherwood Stewart (United States) Zina Garrison	1–6, 6–7^{(3–7)}

Awards
Preceded by (Soviet Union) Svetlana Parkhomenko	Karen Krantzcke Sportsmanship Award; 1989	Succeeded by (Argentina) Mercedes Paz
