= Beate Reinstadler =

Austrian tennis player

- Country (sports): Austria
- Born: 20 May 1967 (age 59) Stuttgart, Germany
- Height: 1.68 m (5 ft 6 in)
- Turned pro: 1986
- Plays: 1997
- Prize money: US$279,231

Singles
- Career record: 125–146
- Career titles: 0 WTA, 2 ITF
- Highest ranking: No. 60 (20 June 1994)

Grand Slam singles results
- Australian Open: 3R (1994)
- French Open: 3R (1995)
- Wimbledon: 2R (1995)
- US Open: 1R (1990, 1991, 1993, 1994, 1995)

Doubles
- Career record: 21–54
- Highest ranking: No. 147 (6 February 1995)
- Last updated on: 9 September 2016.

Beate Reinstadler (born 20 May 1967) is a former professional Austrian tennis player.

== Career ==
Reinstadler played on the WTA Tour between 1986 and 1997. During that time she won two ITF titles, one in Ashkelon and one in Flensburg. Despite no standout performance in Grand Slam events, Reinstadler did reach the third round at the Australian Open in 1994 and at the French Open in 1995.

Reinstadler reached a career-high singles ranking of No. 60 on 20 June 1994. Her highest doubles ranking was No. 147, achieved on 6 February 1995. During her career she defeated many top ten players, including No. 3 Helena Suková and No. 7 Lisa Raymond at Stratton Mountain in 1993.

Reinstadler played for Austria in the Fed Cup on four occasions. She won one match and lost the other three. She retired from professional tennis in 1997.

== ITF finals ==
=== Singles: 4 (2 titles, 2 runner-ups) ===
Legend $25,000 tournaments $15,000 tournaments $10,000 tournaments	Finals by surface Hard (1–0) Clay (0–0) Grass (0–0) Carpet (1–2)

Result	Date	Category	Tournament	Surface	Opponent	Score
Win	6 March 1989	10,000	Ashkelon, Israel	Hard	(Netherlands) Marianne van der Torre	2–6, 4–6
Loss	6 November 1989	25,000	Swindon, Great Britain	Carpet (i)	(Soviet Union) Elena Brioukhovets	2–6, 4–6
Loss	6 April 1992	25,000	Limoges, France	Carpet (i)	(Czechoslovakia) Petra Holubová	1–6, 5–7
Win	14 October 1996	25,000	Flensburg, Germany	Carpet (i)	(Germany) Marlene Weingärtner	4–6, 7–6^{(7–5)}, 7–5
