= Maria Strandlund =

Swedish tennis player

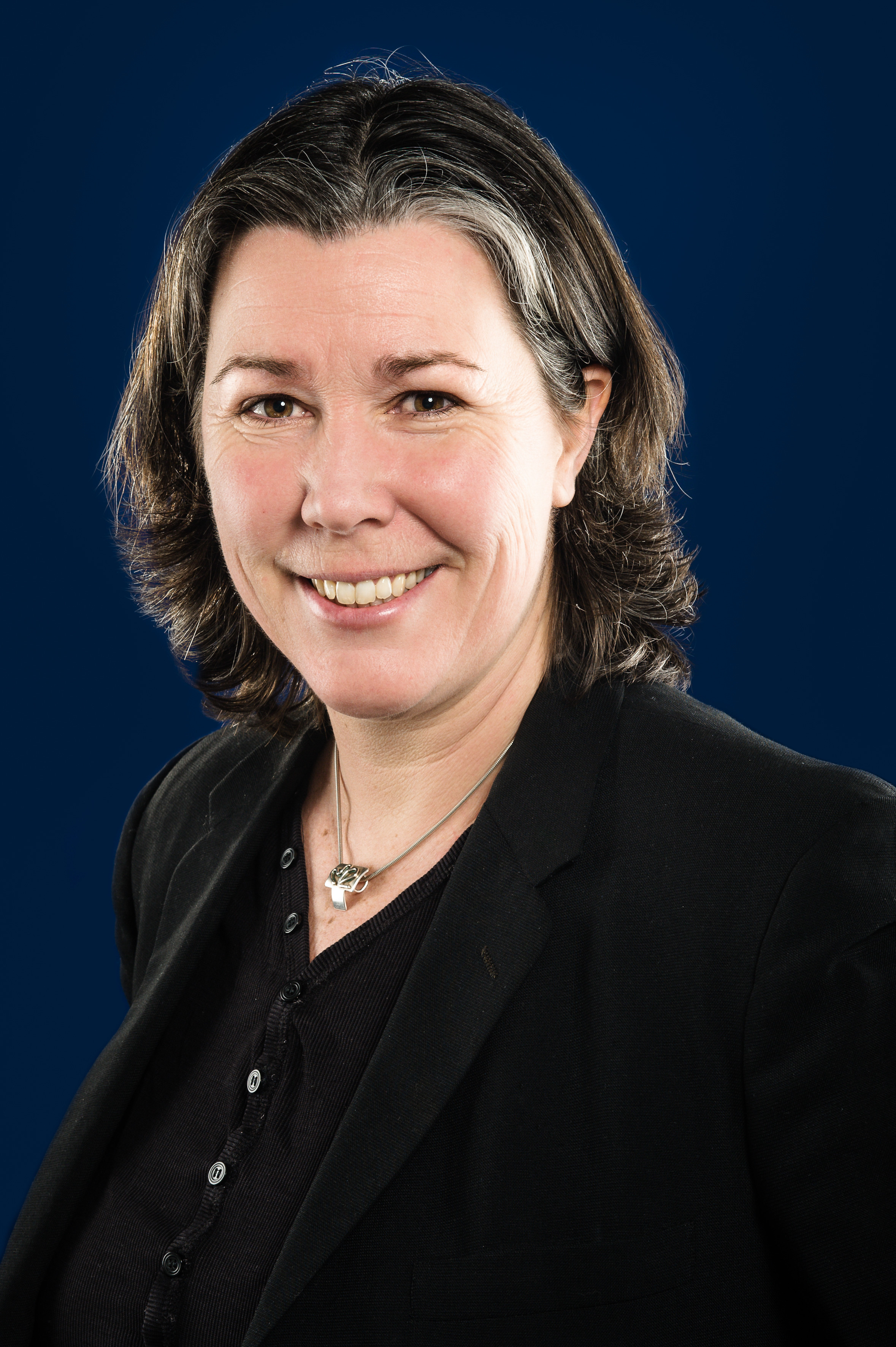
- Country (sports): Sweden
- Born: 17 August 1969 (age 56)
- Retired: 1997
- Prize money: US$ 448,550

Singles
- Career record: 180–165
- Career titles: 1 ITF
- Highest ranking: No. 80 (20 November 1989)

Grand Slam singles results
- Australian Open: 2R (1989, 1993)
- French Open: 3R (1988)
- Wimbledon: 3R (1991)
- US Open: 3R (1990)

Doubles
- Career record: 145–139
- Career titles: 1 WTA, 9 ITF
- Highest ranking: No. 45 (23 October 1995)

Grand Slam doubles results
- Australian Open: 2R (1989, 1995, 1996)
- French Open: 2R (1989, 1994, 1995, 1996)
- Wimbledon: 2R (1995)
- US Open: 2R (1997)

Grand Slam mixed doubles results
- Australian Open: 1R (1996)
- French Open: 2R (1991, 1995)
- Wimbledon: QF (1993)

Team competitions
- Fed Cup: 13–20

Maria Strandlund (born 17 August 1969) is a former professional tennis player from Sweden. She competed in the Fed Cup from 1988 to 2000.

== WTA career finals ==
=== Doubles 2 (1 title, 1 runner-up) ===
Legend
| WTA Championships | 0 |
| Tier I | 0 |
| Tier II | 1 |
| Tier III | 0 |
| Tier IV & V | 0 |

Titles by surface
| Hard | 0 |
| Clay | 0 |
| Grass | 0 |
| Carpet | 1 |

| Result | Date | Tournament | Surface | Partner | Opponents | Score |
|---|---|---|---|---|---|---|
| Win | Oct 1994 | Essen Open, Germany | Carpet (i) | (Sweden) Maria Lindström | (Russia) Eugenia Maniokova (Georgia (country)) Leila Meskhi | 6–2, 6–1 |
| Loss | May 1995 | Prague Open, Czech Republic | Clay | (Sweden) Maria Lindström | (United States) Chanda Rubin (United States) Linda Wild | 7–6, 3–6, 2–6 |

== ITF finals ==
$100,000 tournaments
$75,000 tournaments
$50,000 tournaments
$25,000 tournaments
$10,000 tournaments

=== Singles (1–4) ===
| Result | No. | Date | Tournament | Surface | Opponent | Score |
|---|---|---|---|---|---|---|
| Win | 1. | 26 January 1987 | ITF Stavanger, Norway | Carpet (i) | (Finland) Petra Thorén | 7–6, 6–2 |
| Loss | 2. | 21 September 1987 | ITF Llorca, Spain | Clay | (Spain) Janet Souto | 6–1, 4–6, 4–6 |
| Loss | 3. | 8 February 1988 | ITF Stavanger, Norway | Carpet (i) | (West Germany) Steffi Menning | 4–6, 7–6, 4–6 |
| Loss | 4. | 29 January 1990 | ITF Danderyd, Sweden | Hard (i) | (Finland) Nanne Dahlman | 3–6, 3–6 |
| Loss | 5. | 10 August 1992 | ITF Sopot, Poland | Clay | (Czechoslovakia) Radka Bobková | 4–6, 6–4, 4–6 |

=== Doubles (9–9) ===
| Result | No. | Date | Tournament | Surface | Partner | Opponents | Score |
|---|---|---|---|---|---|---|---|
| Loss | 1. | 19 January 1987 | ITF Stockholm, Sweden | Carpet (i) | (Sweden) Jonna Jonerup | (Sweden) Catrin Jexell (Sweden) Helena Olsson | 2–6, 3–6 |
| Win | 2. | 2 February 1987 | ITF Hørsholm, Denmark | Carpet (i) | (Sweden) Jonna Jonerup | (Sweden) Maria Ekstrand (Denmark) Lone Vandborg | 6–1, 6–3 |
| Loss | 3. | 21 September 1987 | ITF Šibenik, Yugoslavia | Clay | (Sweden) Jonna Jonerup | (Netherlands) Yvonne der Kinderen (Netherlands) Hester Witvoet | 3–6, 3–6 |
| Loss | 4. | 26 October 1987 | ITF Cheshire, United Kingdom | Carpet (i) | (Hong Kong) Paulette Moreno | (Soviet Union) Eugenia Maniokova (Soviet Union) Natalia Medvedeva | 2–6, 6–7 |
| Loss | 5. | 1 February 1988 | ITF Jönköping, Sweden | Carpet (i) | (Sweden) Jonna Jonerup | (United States) Jennifer Fuchs (United States) Jill Smoller | 2–6, 4–6 |
| Win | 6. | 8 February 1988 | ITF Stavanger, Norway | Carpet (i) | (Sweden) Jonna Jonerup | (France) Sophie Amiach (United States) Lisa Bobby | 6–2, 7–6 |
| Win | 7. | 11 April 1988 | ITF Caserta, Italy | Clay | (United States) Jennifer Fuchs | (Netherlands) Hellas ter Riet (Czechoslovakia) Olga Votavová | 2–6, 6–3, 6–1 |
| Win | 8. | 26 February 1990 | ITF Key Biscayne, United States | Hard | (United States) Jennifer Fuchs | (Poland) Renata Baranski (South Africa) Linda Barnard | 6–4, 6–4 |
| Loss | 9. | 15 April 1991 | ITF Caserta, Italy | Clay | (United States) Jennifer Fuchs | (Argentina) Inés Gorrochategui (Brazil) Andrea Vieira | 2–6, 2–6 |
| Loss | 10. | 10 May 1992 | ITF Porto, Portugal | Clay | (United States) Jennifer Fuchs | (Spain) Virginia Ruano Pascual (Australia) Michelle Jaggard-Lai | 3–6, 5–7 |
| Loss | 11. | 10 August 1992 | ITF Sopot, Poland | Clay | (United States) Jessica Emmons | (Poland) Katarzyna Teodorowicz (Czechoslovakia) Markéta Štusková | 4–6, 2–6 |
| Win | 12. | 14 September 1992 | ITF Karlovy Vary, Czech Republic | Clay | (Sweden) Maria Lindström | (Czechoslovakia) Kateřina Kroupová-Šišková (Czechoslovakia) Jana Pospíšilová | 6–1, 6–2 |
| Win | 13. | 3 April 1994 | ITF Moulins, France | Clay | (Sweden) Maria Lindström | (Germany) Katja Oeljeklaus (France) Angelique Olivier | 3–6, 7–6, 6–0 |
| Win | 14. | 10 April 1994 | ITF Limoges, France | Clay | (France) Isabelle Demongeot | (France) Angelique Olivier (Austria) Heidi Sprung | 6–2, 6–2 |
| Win | 15. | 10 July 1994 | ITF Erlangen, Germany | Clay | (Sweden) Maria Lindström | (Slovenia) Janette Husárová (Slovenia) Tina Križan | 6–2, 6–2 |
| Loss | 16. | 20 October 1996 | ITF Cardiff, United Kingdom | Hard (i) | (France) Anne-Gaëlle Sidot | (United Kingdom) Shirli-Ann Siddall (United Kingdom) Amanda Wainwright | 3–6, 3–6 |
| Loss | 17. | 3 November 1996 | ITF Stockholm, Sweden | Hard (i) | (Finland) Nanne Dahlman | (Czech Republic) Sandra Kleinová (Czech Republic) Helena Vildová | 5–7, 4–6 |
| Win | 18. | 9 March 1997 | ITF Rockford, United States | Hard | (United States) Janet Lee | (Ukraine) Elena Brioukhovets (France) Noëlle van Lottum | 7–6, 6–3 |
