= Moscow Ladies Open =

Defunct tennis tournament
- Event name: Moscow Ladies Open (1989–90, 1994–95); St. Petersburg Ladies Open (1991)
- Tour: WTA Tour
- Founded: 1989
- Abolished: 1995
- Editions: 5
- Location: Moscow, Russia
- Surface: Carpet (i)

The Moscow Ladies Open is a defunct WTA Tour affiliated tennis tournament played from 1989 to 1995. It was held in Moscow, Soviet Union, from 1989 to 1990 (under the titles of Virginia Slims of Moscow and Kraft General Foods of Moscow, respectively) and in St. Petersburg, Soviet Union, in 1991 (as St. Petersburg Open) and again in Moscow from 1994 to 1995. Then the tournament was incorporated into the ATP Kremlin Cup, making it a combined event for 1996. The tournament was played on indoor carpet courts.

In 2018, tournament returned in WTA Tour calendar as clay court championship Moscow River Cup.

== Finals ==
=== Singles ===
Year	Champion	Runner-up	Score
1989	(United States) Gretchen Magers	(Soviet Union) Natasha Zvereva	6–3, 6–4
1990	(Soviet Union) Leila Meskhi	(Soviet Union) Elena Brioukhovets	6–4, 6–4
1991	(Soviet Union) Larisa Savchenko	(Germany) Barbara Rittner	3–6, 6–3, 6–4
1992 – 1993	not held		
1994	(Bulgaria) Magdalena Maleeva	(Italy) Sandra Cecchini	7–5, 6–1
1995	(Bulgaria) Magdalena Maleeva	(Russia) Elena Makarova	6–4, 6–2

=== Doubles ===
Year	Champions	Runners-up	Score
1989	(Soviet Union) Larisa Savchenko (Soviet Union) Natasha Zvereva	(France) Nathalie Herreman (France) Catherine Suire	6–3, 6–4
1990	(United States) Gretchen Magers (United States) Robin White	(Soviet Union) Elena Brioukhovets (Soviet Union) Svetlana Parkhomenko	6–2, 6–4
1991	(Ukraine) Elena Brioukhovets (Ukraine) Natalia Medvedeva	(France) Isabelle Demongeot (United Kingdom) Jo Durie	7–5, 6–3
1992 – 1993	not held		
1994	(Russia) Elena Makarova (Russia) Eugenia Maniokova	(Italy) Laura Golarsa (Netherlands) Caroline Vis	7–6, 6–4
1995	(United States) Meredith McGrath (Latvia) Larisa Savchenko	(Russia) Anna Kournikova (Poland) Aleksandra Olsza	6–1, 6–0
