= Elena Makarova =

Russian tennis player

Elena Makarova Елена Макарова
- Country (sports): Soviet Union (1991) (Commonwealth of Independent States) CIS (1992); Russia (from 1993)
- Born: 1 February 1973 (age 53)
- Turned pro: 1991
- Retired: 1999
- Plays: Right-handed
- Prize money: US$ 594,200

Singles
- Career record: 178–128
- Career titles: 6 ITF
- Highest ranking: No. 43 (10 June 1996)

Grand Slam singles results
- Australian Open: 3R (1994, 1995)
- French Open: 3R (1996)
- Wimbledon: 2R (1995, 1997, 1998)
- US Open: 3R (1995)

Doubles
- Career record: 73–67
- Career titles: 1 WTA, 6 ITF
- Highest ranking: No. 36 (12 June 1995)

Grand Slam doubles results
- Australian Open: QF (1996)
- French Open: QF (1995)
- Wimbledon: 1R (1995)
- US Open: 3R (1996)

Team competitions
- Fed Cup: F (1999), record 26–12

Elena Alekseyevna Makarova (Russian: Елена Алексеевна Макарова,, born 1 February 1973), is a former Russian professional tennis player.

Makarova played in the WTA Tour from 1991 to 1999. Her peak performances were in 1995, when she was ranked world No. 36 in doubles, and in 1996, when she was ranked No. 43 in singles. In 2011, she coached Russian tennis player Margarita Gasparyan.

== WTA Tour finals ==
=== Singles: 2 (2 runner-ups) ===
Legend
WTA Championships	0
Tier I	0
Tier II	0
Tier III	0
Tier IV & V	0

Result	W-L	Date	Tournament	Surface	Opponent	Score
Loss	0–1	Sep 1995	Moscow, Russia	Carpet (i)	(Bulgaria) Magdalena Maleeva	4–6, 2–6
Loss	0–2	Jul 1997	Palermo, Italy	Clay	(France) Sandrine Testud	5–7, 3–6

=== Doubles: 1 (1 title) ===
Legend
WTA Championships	0
Tier I	0
Tier II	0
Tier III	1
Tier IV & V	0

Result	W-L	Date	Tournament	Surface	Partner	Opponents	Score
Win	1–0	Sep 1994	Moscow, Russia	Carpet (o)	(Russia) Eugenia Maniokova	(Italy) Laura Golarsa (Netherlands) Caroline Vis	7–6, 6–4

== ITF Circuit finals ==
=== Singles: 11 (6 titles, 5 runner-ups) ===
Legend $100,000 tournaments $75,000 tournaments $50,000 tournaments $25,000 tournaments $10,000 tournaments	Finals by surface Hard (2–1) Clay (2–2) Grass (0–0) Carpet (2–1)

Result	No.	Date	Tournament	Surface	Opponent	Score
Loss	1.	12 August 1991	Rebecq, Belgium	Clay	(Czechoslovakia) Kateřina Šišková	3–6, 0–6
Win	1.	15 September 1991	Haskovo, Bulgaria	Clay	(Bulgaria) Lubomira Bacheva	6–4, 6–4
Win	2.	9 December 1991	Érd, Hungary	Hard (i)	(Czechoslovakia) Petra Holubová	7–5, 6–1
Win	3.	20 January 1992	Bergen, Norway	Carpet (i)	(Germany) Julia Jehs	6–0, 6–0
Loss	2.	27 July 1992	Rheda-Wiedenbrück, Germany	Clay	(Slovenia) Barbara Mulej	5–7, 3–6
Win	4.	19 October 1992	Moscow, Russia	Clay	(Commonwealth of Independent States) Svetlana Parkhomenko	7–5, 6–2
Loss	3.	14 November 1992	Manchester, England	Carpet (i)	(Belgium) Nancy Feber	5–7, 6–4, 2–6
Win	5.	22 November 1992	Nottingham, United Kingdom	Carpet (i)	(Germany) Elena Pampoulova	3–6, 6–2, 7–5
Win	6.	6 December 1993	Val-d'Oise, France	Hard (i)	(Czech Republic) Petra Langrová	0–6, 6–3, 6–2
Loss	4.	4 October 1998	Tbilisi, Georgia	Clay	(Russia) Evgenia Kulikovskaya	6–2, 2–6, 5–7
Loss	5.	1 November 1998	Poitiers, France	Hard (i)	(Socialist Federal Republic of Yugoslavia) Sandra Načuk	0–6, 7–5, 1–6

=== Doubles: 8 (6 titles, 2 runner-ups) ===
$100,000 tournaments $75,000 tournaments $50,000 tournaments $25,000 tournaments $10,000 tournaments	Finals by surface Hard (3–1) Clay (2–1) Grass (0–0) Carpet (1–0)

Result	No.	Date	Tournament	Surface	Partner	Opponent	Score
Loss	1.	1 April 1991	Šibenik, Yugoslavia	Clay	(Soviet Union) Irina Sukhova	(Czechoslovakia) Zdeňka Málková (Czechoslovakia) Janette Husárová	1–6, 5–7
Win	1.	30 March 1992	Moncalieri, Italy	Clay	(Czechoslovakia) Kateřina Šišková	(Czechoslovakia) Radka Bobková (Czechoslovakia) Jana Pospíšilová	6–4, 2–6, 6–2
Win	2.	25 May 1992	Putignano, Italy	Hard	(Commonwealth of Independent States) Olga Lugina	(Commonwealth of Independent States) Aida Khalatian (Commonwealth of Independent States) Karina Kuregian	6–2, 6–4
Win	3.	15 November 1992	Manchester, United Kingdom	Carpet (i)	(Commonwealth of Independent States) Elena Likhovtseva	(Bulgaria) Elena Pampoulova (Switzerland) Natalie Tschan	6–3, 6–4
Loss	2.	28 March 1993	Brest, France	Hard	(Kazakhstan) Elena Likhovtseva	(Netherlands) Kristie Boogert (Netherlands) Linda Niemantsverdriet	6–4, 5–7, 5–7
Win	4.	5 July 1993	Erlangen, Germany	Clay	(Russia) Eugenia Maniokova	(Slovakia) Janette Husárová (Australia) Danielle Thomas	6–1, 6–4
Win	5.	6 December 1993	Val-d'Oise, France	Hard (i)	(Poland) Magdalena Feistel	(France) Isabelle Demongeot (France) Catherine Suire	2–6, 6–3, 6–4
Win	6.	1 November 1998	Poitiers, France	Hard (i)	(Ukraine) Olga Lugina	(Germany) Gabriela Kučerová (Czech Republic) Radka Pelikánová	6–0, 6–1

=== Head to head ===
- Lindsay Davenport: 0–3
- Venus Williams: 1–0
- Arantxa Sánchez Vicario: 1–2
- Dominique Monami: 0–1
- Martina Hingis: 0–1

== Junior Grand Slam finals ==
=== Girls' singles: 1 (runner-up) ===
Result	Year	Tournament	Surface	Opponent	Score
Loss	1991	Wimbledon	Grass	(Germany) Barbara Rittner	7–6^{(8–6)}, 2–6, 3–6

== Legacy ==
In Russia, despite her modest popularity as a top-50 player, Makarova is well known for providing her explanation for the issue of LGBT-athletes being more common among female tennis players than on the ATP Tour (while the most popular example was Toomas Leius according to the locally popular 1993 short story Fugue with [Male] Tennis Player by Mikhail Veller). She said the following: “When you get tired after a match or training, you no longer want to dress up or go to a party. Therefore, some tennis players solve the problem of sex [absence] by means of "lesser bloodshed" [local idiom which means "easy" in a dual meaning: the simpler the better or silly] — with each other. Besides, you can't afford to take your beloved man with you — he has to work himself". The last part has been clarified to mean that "most female tennis players cannot afford traveling with their beloved man financially".
