= Elena Brioukhovets =

Soviet-Ukrainian tennis player

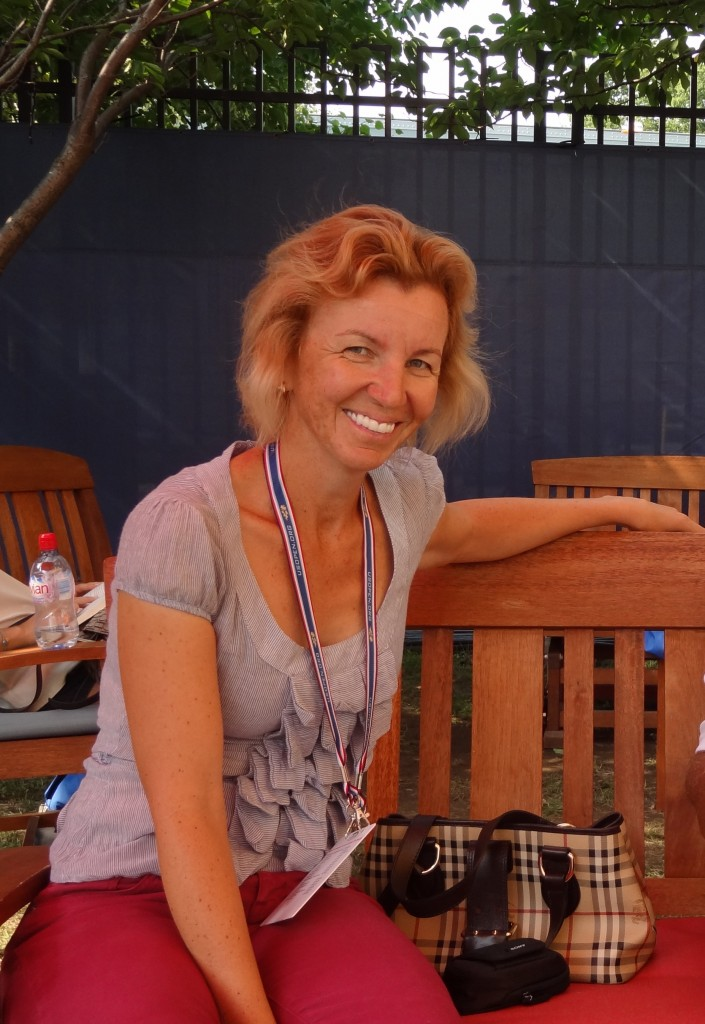
- Country (sports): Ukraine
- Born: 8 June 1971 (age 54) Odesa, Ukrainian SSR
- Turned pro: 1989
- Retired: 1997
- Prize money: US$ 386,215

Singles
- Career record: 149–124
- Career titles: 4 ITF
- Highest ranking: No. 46 (17 June 1991)

Grand Slam singles results
- Australian Open: 1R (1991, 1993)
- French Open: 3R (1991, 1992)
- Wimbledon: 3R (1991, 1993)
- US Open: 2R (1991)

Doubles
- Career record: 132–90
- Career titles: 3 WTA, 14 ITF
- Highest ranking: No. 46 (11 March 1991)

Grand Slam doubles results
- Australian Open: 1R (1991)
- French Open: 2R (1991, 1992, 1993)
- Wimbledon: 1R (1990, 1997)
- US Open: 2R (1992, 1993, 1994)

Elena Brioukhovets (Ukrainian: Олена Брюховець; born 8 June 1971) is a Ukrainian former professional tennis player and an Honored Master of Sports.

Brioukhovets started her own tennis school in 2007. The school was previously based in Odesa, Ukraine, but is currently located in Ryazan, Russia.

== WTA career finals ==
=== Singles: 1 (runner-up) ===
Legend
Grand Slam	0
Tier I	0
Tier II	0
Tier III	0
Tier IV & V	0

Result	W/L	Date	Tournament	Surface	Opponent	Score
Loss	0–1	Oct 1990	Kremlin Cup, Russia	Carpet (i)	(Soviet Union) Leila Meskhi	4–6, 4–6

=== Doubles: 5 (3 titles, 2 runner-ups) ===
Legend
Grand Slam	0
Tier I	0
Tier II	0
Tier III	0
Tier IV & V	2

Titles by surface
Hard	1
Clay	1
Grass	0
Carpet	1

Result	W/L	Date	Tournament	Surface	Partner	Opponents	Score
Win	1–0	May 1990	Ilva Trophy, Italy	Clay	(Soviet Union) Eugenia Maniokova	(Italy) Silvia Farina (Italy) Rita Grande	7–6, 6–1
Loss	1–1	Oct 1990	Kremlin Cup, Russia	Carpet (i)	(Soviet Union) Eugenia Maniokova	(United States) Gretchen Magers (United States) Robin White	2–6, 4–6
Win	2–1	Oct 1990	Puerto Rico Open	Hard	(Soviet Union) Natalia Medvedeva	(United States) Amy Frazier (New Zealand) Julie Richardson	6–4, 6–2
Win	3–1	Sep 1991	St. Petersburg, Russia	Carpet (i)	(Ukraine) Natalia Medvedeva	(France) Isabelle Demongeot (United Kingdom) Jo Durie	7–5, 6–3
Loss	3–2	May 1992	Belgian Open	Clay	(Czech Republic) Petra Langrová	(Netherlands) Manon Bollegraf (Netherlands) Caroline Vis	4–6, 3–6

== ITF finals ==
$100,000 tournaments
$75,000 tournaments
$50,000 tournaments
$25,000 tournaments
$10,000 tournaments

=== Singles: 5 (4–1) ===
Result	No.	Date	Tournament	Surface	Opponent	Score
Win	1.	7 August 1989	ITF Paderborn, West Germany	Clay	(West Germany) Michaela Kriebel	6–1, 6–7, 6–3
Win	2.	23 October 1989	ITF Burgdorf, Switzerland	Carpet (i)	(France) Valérie Batut	6–4, 6–1
Win	3.	6 November 1989	ITF Swindon, United Kingdom	Carpet (i)	(Austria) Beate Reinstadler	6–2, 6–4
Loss	4.	23 April 1990	ITF Caserta, Italy	Clay	(Poland) Katarzyna Nowak	6–1, 2–6, 3–6
Win	5.	30 September 1996	ITF Newport Beach, United States	Hard	(Argentina) Mercedes Paz	6–2, 6–4

=== Doubles: 16 (14–2) ===
Result	No.	Date	Tournament	Surface	Partner	Opponents	Score
Win	1.	28 September 1987	ITF Bol, Yugoslavia	Clay	(Soviet Union) Viktoria Milvidskaia	(Soviet Union) Aida Halatian (Soviet Union) Eugenia Maniokova	6–4, 5–7, 6–4
Win	2.	15 August 1988	ITF Rebecq, Belgium	Clay	(Soviet Union) Viktoria Milvidskaia	(Israel) Ilana Berger (Israel) Anat Varon	6–2, 6–2
Win	3.	29 August 1988	ITF Nivelles, Belgium	Clay	(Soviet Union) Viktoria Milvidskaia	(Hungary) Réka Szikszay (Netherlands) Amy van Buuren	1–6, 7–5, 6–1
Win	4.	24 July 1989	ITF Subiaco, Italy	Clay	(Soviet Union) Eugenia Maniokova	(Israel) Medi Dadoch (Israel) Yael Segal	6–2, 6–0
Loss	5.	7 August 1989	ITF Paderborn, West Germany	Clay	(Soviet Union) Eugenia Maniokova	(Czechoslovakia) Ivana Jankovská (Czechoslovakia) Eva Melicharová	4–6, 2–6
Win	6.	23 October 1989	ITF Burgdorf, Switzerland	Carpet (i)	(Soviet Union) Eugenia Maniokova	(Switzerland) Sandrine Jaquet (Switzerland) Eva Krapl	6–4, 6–2
Win	7.	30 October 1989	ITF Pforzheim, West Germany	Hard (i)	(Soviet Union) Eugenia Maniokova	(West Germany) Caroline Schneider (United States) Elizabeth Galphin	6–1, 6–1
Win	8.	6 November 1989	ITF Swindon, United Kingdom	Carpet (i)	(Soviet Union) Eugenia Maniokova	(United Kingdom) Julie Salmon (Netherlands) Caroline Vis	6–3, 6–4
Win	9.	22 January 1990	ITF Helsinki, Finland	Carpet (i)	(Soviet Union) Eugenia Maniokova	(Sweden) Nina Erickson (Sweden) Eva Lena Olsson	6–1, 6–4
Win	10.	29 January 1990	ITF Danderyd, Sweden	Hard (i)	(Soviet Union) Eugenia Maniokova	(West Germany) Carolin Franzke (West Germany) Caroline Schneider	6–2, 6–0
Win	11.	5 February 1990	ITF Stavanger, Norway	Carpet (i)	(Sweden) Nina Erickson	(West Germany) Barbara Rittner (West Germany) Heike Thoms	6–2, 6–2
Win	12.	23 April 1990	ITF Caserta, Italy	Hard	(Soviet Union) Eugenia Maniokova	(Czechoslovakia) Michaela Frimmelová (Hungary) Réka Szikszay	4–6, 6–3, 6–1
Win	13.	6 May 1996	ITF Szczecin, Poland	Clay	(Ukraine) Elena Tatarkova	(Czech Republic) Lenka Cenková (Czech Republic) Adriana Gerši	6–2, 6–1
Win	14.	16 June 1996	ITF Tashkent, Uzbekistan	Clay	(Ukraine) Elena Tatarkova	(Germany) Katrin Kilsch (Australia) Robyn Mawdsley	6–4, 6–2
Loss	15.	9 March 1997	ITF Rockford, Illinois	Hard	(France) Noëlle van Lottum	(United States) Janet Lee (Sweden) Maria Strandlund	6–7, 3–6
Win	16.	11 September 2000	ITF Odesa, Ukraine	Hard	(Ukraine) Inna Brioukhovets	(Ukraine) Natalia Bogdanova (Ukraine) Juleya Semenets	6–3, 6–3
