= Eugenia Maniokova =

Russian tennis player (born 1968)

Eugenia Manyukova
- Full name: Eugenia Aleksandrovna Manyukova
- Country (sports): Soviet Union (1989–1991); Russian Federation (1991–1996)
- Born: 17 May 1968 (age 58) Moscow, Soviet Union
- Turned pro: June 1989
- Retired: May 1996
- Plays: Right-handed
- Prize money: US$ 429,742

Singles
- Career record: 154–116
- Career titles: 0 WTA, 3 ITF
- Highest ranking: No. 66 (June 22, 1992)

Grand Slam singles results
- Australian Open: 2R (1995)
- French Open: 1R (1992, 1994)
- Wimbledon: 1R (1992, 1994)
- US Open: 2R (1994)

Doubles
- Career record: 187–92
- Career titles: 4 WTA, 20 ITF
- Highest ranking: No. 18 (November 21, 1994)

Grand Slam doubles results
- Australian Open: QF (1995, 1996)
- French Open: QF (1994, 1995)
- Wimbledon: 2R (1993, 1994)
- US Open: 2R (1993, 1994, 1995)

Grand Slam mixed doubles results
- French Open: W (1993)

Eugenia Aleksandrovna Manyukova (Russian: Евгения Александровна Манюкова, IPA: [jɪvˈɡʲenʲɪjə mənʲʊˈkovə]; born 17 May 1968) is a retired professional tennis player from Russia. She is a former world No. 18 in doubles.

== Biography ==
Manyukova is best known for winning the mixed doubles event at the 1993 French Open partnering Andrei Olhovskiy. In her career, she won four titles in women's doubles on the WTA Tour, and three titles in singles and 24 in women's doubles on the ITF Women's Circuit. Manyukova represented Commonwealth of Independent States at both the 1992 Summer Olympics and 1992 Federation Cup, due to the separation of the Soviet Union.

Manyukova retired after playing at the 1996 French Open.

== Grand Slam finals ==
=== Mixed doubles (1 title) ===
Result	Year	Championship	Surface	Partner	Opponents	Score
Win	1993	French Open	Clay	(Russia) Andrei Olhovskiy	(South Africa) Elna Reinach (South Africa) Danie Visser	6–2, 4–6, 6–4

== WTA Tour finals ==
=== Doubles 8 (4 titles, 4 runners-up) ===
Legend
WTA Championships	0
Tier I	0
Tier II	0
Tier III	3
Tier IV & V	1

Titles by surface
Hard	0
Clay	1
Grass	0
Carpet	3

Result	W/L	Date	Tournament	Surface	Partner	Opponents	Score
Win	1–0	May 1990	Taranto, Italy	Clay	(Soviet Union) Elena Brioukhovets	(Italy) Silvia Farina (Italy) Rita Grande	7–6, 6–1
Loss	1–1	Oct 1990	Moscow, Russia	Carpet (i)	(Soviet Union) Elena Brioukhovets	(United States) Gretchen Magers (United States) Robin White	2–6, 4–6
Win	2–1	Feb 1993	Linz, Austria	Carpet (i)	(Georgia (country)) Leila Meskhi	(Spain) Conchita Martínez (Austria) Judith Wiesner	w/o
Loss	2–2	Mar 1993	Houston, United States	Clay	(Slovakia) Radka Zrubáková	(United States) Katrina Adams (Netherlands) Manon Bollegraf	3–6, 7–5, 6–7^{(7–9)}
Win	3–2	Feb 1994	Linz, Austria	Carpet (i)	(Georgia (country)) Leila Meskhi	(Sweden) Åsa Carlsson (Germany) Caroline Schneider	6–2, 6–2
Loss	3–3	Apr 1994	Hamburg, Germany	Clay	(Georgia (country)) Leila Meskhi	(Czech Republic) Jana Novotná (Spain) Arantxa Sánchez Vicario	3–6, 2–6
Win	4–3	Sep 1994	Moscow, Russia	Carpet (i)	(Russia) Elena Makarova	(Italy) Laura Golarsa (Netherlands) Caroline Vis	7–6, 6–4
Loss	4–4	Oct 1994	Essen, Germany	Carpet (i)	(Georgia (country)) Leila Meskhi	(Sweden) Maria Lindström (Sweden) Maria Strandlund	2–6, 1–6

== ITF finals ==
=== Singles (3–3) ===
$100,000 tournaments
$75,000 tournaments
$50,000 tournaments
$25,000 tournaments
$10,000 tournaments

Result	No.	Date	Tournament	Surface	Opponent	Score
Win	1.	14 September 1987	Sofia, Bulgaria	Clay	(Soviet Union) Viktoria Milvidskaia	6–1, 6–0
Loss	2.	9 November 1987	Eastbourne, United Kingdom	Clay	(Soviet Union) Natalia Medvedeva	2–6, 5–7
Loss	3.	13 June 1988	Salerno, Italy	Clay	(Czechoslovakia) Sylvia Štefková	5–7, 5–7
Win	4.	24 July 1989	Subiaco, Italy	Clay	(France) Nathalie Ballet	6–3, 6–2
Win	5.	31 July 1989	Rheda-Wiedenbrück, West Germany	Clay	(West Germany) Antonia Homolya	6–4, 6–1
Loss	6.	8 April 1991	Limoges, France	Carpet	(France) Alexandra Fusai	5–7, 7–5, 4–6

=== Doubles (20–5) ===
Result	No	Date	Tournament	Surface	Partner	Opponents	Score
Win	1.	6 April 1987	Caserta, Italy	Hard	(Soviet Union) Natalia Medvedeva	(West Germany) Heike Thoms (Greece) Olga Tsarbopoulou	6–3, 7–5
Loss	2.	28 September 1987	Bol, Yugoslavia	Clay	(Soviet Union) Aida Halatian	(Soviet Union) Elena Brioukhovets (Soviet Union) Viktoria Milvidskaia	4–6, 7–5, 4–6
Win	3.	26 October 1987	Cheshire, United Kingdom	Carpet	(Soviet Union) Natalia Medvedeva	(Hong Kong) Paulette Moreno (Sweden) Maria Strandlund	6–2, 7–6
Win	4.	2 November 1987	Telford, United Kingdom	Hard	(Soviet Union) Natalia Medvedeva	(West Germany) Sabine Hack (West Germany) Ingrid Peltzer	6–0, 6–2
Win	5.	9 November 1987	Eastbourne, United Kingdom	Carpet	(Soviet Union) Natalia Medvedeva	(France) Pascale Etchemendy (United Kingdom) Joy Tacon	6–1, 6–1
Loss	6.	16 November 1987	Croydon, United Kingdom	Carpet	(Soviet Union) Natalia Medvedeva	(Soviet Union) Viktoria Milvidskaia (Hong Kong) Paulette Moreno	4–6, 1–6
Win	7.	12 June 1988	Modena, Italy	Clay	(Soviet Union) Viktoria Milvidskaia	(Indonesia) Yayuk Basuki (Japan) Ei Iida	6–3, 4–6, 6–0
Win	8.	19 June 1988	Salerno, Italy	Clay	(Soviet Union) Viktoria Milvidskaia	(Finland) Anne Aallonen (Indonesia) Yayuk Basuki	1–6, 7–5, 6–4
Win	9.	26 June 1988	Arezzo, Italy	Clay	(Soviet Union) Viktoria Milvidskaia	(Indonesia) Yayuk Basuki (Netherlands) Titia Wilmink	0–6, 7–5, 6–1
Win	10.	17 April 1989	Caserta, Italy	Hard	(Soviet Union) Natalia Medvedeva	(Finland) Nanne Dahlman (Australia) Kate McDonald	6–4, 6–4
Win	11.	24 July 1989	Subiaco, Italy	Clay	(Soviet Union) Elena Brioukhovets	(Israel) Medi Dadoch (Israel) Yael Segal	6–2, 6–0
Loss	12.	7 August 1989	Paderborn, West Germany	Clay	(Soviet Union) Elena Brioukhovets	(Czechoslovakia) Ivana Jankovská (Czechoslovakia) Eva Melicharová	4–6, 2–6
Win	13.	23 October 1989	Burgdorf, Switzerland	Carpet (i)	(Soviet Union) Elena Brioukhovets	(Switzerland) Sandrine Jaquet (Switzerland) Eva Krapl	6–4, 6–2
Win	14.	30 October 1989	Pforzheim, West Germany	Hard	(Soviet Union) Elena Brioukhovets	(West Germany) Caroline Schneider (United States) Elizabeth Galphin	6–1, 6–1
Win	15.	6 November 1989	Swindon, United Kingdom	Carpet	(Soviet Union) Elena Brioukhovets	(United Kingdom) Julie Salmon (Netherlands) Caroline Vis	6–3, 6–4
Win	16.	22 January 1990	Helsinki, Finland	Carpet	(Soviet Union) Elena Brioukhovets	(Sweden) Nina Erickson (Sweden) Eva Lena Olsson	6–1, 6–4
Win	17.	29 January 1990	Danderyd, Sweden	Hard (i)	(Soviet Union) Elena Brioukhovets	(West Germany) Carolin Franzke (West Germany) Caroline Schneider	6–2, 6–0
Win	18.	16 April 1990	Caserta, Italy	Hard	(Soviet Union) Elena Brioukhovets	(Czechoslovakia) Michaela Frimmelová (Hungary) Réka Szikszay	4–6, 6–3, 6–1
Loss	19.	7 May 1990	Erlangen, West Germany	Clay	(Latvia) Agnese Blumberga	(West Germany) Eva Pfaff (Hungary) Réka Szikszay	3–6, 1–6
Win	20.	16 July 1990	Darmstadt, West Germany	Clay	(Latvia) Agnese Blumberga	(Netherlands) Simone Schilder (Argentina) Andrea Tiezzi	6–4, 6–4
Loss	21.	12 November 1990	Swindon, United Kingdom	Carpet	(Finland) Anne Aallonen	(Sweden) Maria Lindstrom (United States) Heather Ludloff	6–4, 4–6, 6–7
Win	22.	8 April 1991	Limoges, France	Carpet	(Finland) Anne Aallonen	(Spain) Rosa Bielsa (Spain) Janet Souto	6–3, 1–6, 7–5
Win	23.	2 December 1991	Le Havre, France	Clay	(France) Nathalie Herreman	(Netherlands) Gaby Coorengel (Netherlands) Amy van Buuren	6–3, 6–4
Win	24.	5 July 1993	Erlangen, Germany	Clay	(Russia) Elena Makarova	(Slovakia) Janette Husárová (Australia) Danielle Thomas	6–1, 6–4
Win	25.	18 October 1993	Flensburg, Germany	Carpet	(Latvia) Agnese Blumberga	(Germany) Tanja Karsten (Germany) Michaela Seibold	6–3, 6–1

== Other finals ==
=== Singles (2-1) ===
Outcome	No.	Year	Tournament	Location	Opponent	Score
Winner	1.	1988	USSR Tennis National Championship	Donetsk, Ukrainian SSR	(Soviet Union) Anna Mirza	6–3, 3–6, 6–3
Winner	2.	1990	USSR Tennis National Championship	Moscow, Russian SFSR	(Soviet Union) Elena Makarova	6–3, 6–2
Runner-up	3.	1991	USSR Tennis National Championship	Moscow, Russian SFSR	(Soviet Union) Svetlana Komleva	6–3, 6–2

=== Doubles (0-1) ===
Outcome	No.	Year	Tournament	Location	Partner	Opponents	Score
Runner-up	1.	1989	USSR Winter Tennis National Championship	Moscow, Russian SFSR	(Soviet Union) Elena Pogorelova	(Soviet Union) Larisa Savchenko (Soviet Union) Natasha Zvereva	7–6, 0–1 ret.

=== Mixed (1-0) ===
Outcome	No.	Year	Tournament	Location	Partner	Opponents	Score
Winner	1.	1991	USSR Tennis National Championship	Moscow, Russian SFSR	(Soviet Union) Dimitri Poliakov	(Soviet Union) Natalia Egorova (Soviet Union) Alexei Filippov	6–4, 6–4
