= 1992 Wimbledon Championships – Women's doubles qualifying =

Women's doubles qualifying
- 1992 Wimbledon Championships

Events
Singles	men	women		boys	girls
Doubles	men	women	mixed	boys	girls
WC Singles	men	women	quad
WC Doubles	men	women	quad
Legends	men	women	seniors

Qualification
Singles	men	women
Doubles	men	women
- Wimbledon Championships

Players and pairs who neither have high enough rankings nor receive wild cards may participate in a qualifying tournament held one week before the annual Wimbledon Tennis Championships.

== Seeds ==
1. (Netherlands) Ingelise Driehuis / (Australia) Louise Pleming (qualifying competition)
2. (United States) Jessica Emmons / (United States) Ann Henricksson (second round)
3. (Australia) Louise Stacey / (Australia) Angie Woolcock (qualifying competition)
4. (Japan) Akiko Kijimuta / (Japan) Naoko Sawamatsu (qualified)
5. (Australia) Justine Hodder / (Australia) Kirrily Sharpe (qualified)
6. (United States) Lindsay Davenport / (United States) Stella Sampras (qualifying competition)
7. (Netherlands) Carin Bakkum / (Sweden) Maria Strandlund (qualified)
8. (Australia) Danielle Jones / (South Africa) Tessa Price (qualified)

== Qualifiers ==
1. (Netherlands) Carin Bakkum / (Sweden) Maria Strandlund
2. (Australia) Justine Hodder / (Australia) Kirrily Sharpe
3. (Japan) Akiko Kijimuta / (Japan) Naoko Sawamatsu
4. (Australia) Danielle Jones / (South Africa) Tessa Price

== Qualifying draw ==
=== First qualifier ===
First round
1	(Netherlands) Ingelise Driehuis (Australia) Louise Pleming	6	6
(United States) Pam Nelson (Republic of Ireland) Siobhán Nicholson	0	3
WC	(United Kingdom) Kaye Hand (United Kingdom) Caroline Herbert	1	0
(France) Agnes Romand (Japan) Ai Sugiyama	6	6
(United Kingdom) Sarah Bentley (Australia) Robyn Mawdsley	3	2
(Japan) Ayako Hirose (Japan) Yone Kamio	6	6
(Namibia) Elizma Nortje (United States) Sylvia Schenck	2	5
7	(Netherlands) Carin Bakkum (Sweden) Maria Strandlund	6	7

Second round
1	(Netherlands) Ingelise Driehuis (Australia) Louise Pleming	6	6
(France) Agnes Romand (Japan) Ai Sugiyama	0	3
(Japan) Ayako Hirose (Japan) Yone Kamio	2	1
7	(Netherlands) Carin Bakkum (Sweden) Maria Strandlund	6	6

Qualifying competition
1	(Netherlands) Ingelise Driehuis (Australia) Louise Pleming	6	5	1
7	(Netherlands) Carin Bakkum (Sweden) Maria Strandlund	2	7	6

=== Second qualifier ===
First round
3	(Australia) Louise Stacey (Australia) Angie Woolcock	6	6
(South Africa) Joannette Kruger (Netherlands) Claire Wegink	2	4
(Thailand) Suvimol Duangchan (Thailand) Benjamas Sangaram	5	2
(South Africa) Rikki Gaddie (South Africa) Toni Gaddie	7	6
WC	(United Kingdom) Lucie Ahl (United Kingdom) Caroline Hunt	4	0
(United Kingdom) Barbara Griffiths (United Kingdom) Jane Wood	6	6
(Spain) Bárbara Navarro (Spain) Silvia Ramón-Cortés	2	0
5	(Australia) Justine Hodder (Australia) Kirrily Sharpe	6	6

Second round
3	(Australia) Louise Stacey (Australia) Angie Woolcock	6	6
(South Africa) Rikki Gaddie (South Africa) Toni Gaddie	2	3
(United Kingdom) Barbara Griffiths (United Kingdom) Jane Wood	6^{6}	2
5	(Australia) Justine Hodder (Australia) Kirrily Sharpe	7^{8}	6

Qualifying competition
(Australia) Louise Stacey (Australia) Angie Woolcock	4	2
5	(Australia) Justine Hodder (Australia) Kirrily Sharpe	6	6

=== Third qualifier ===
First round
6	(United States) Lindsay Davenport (United States) Stella Sampras	7^{7}	6
(Japan) Tamaka Takagi (France) Agnès Zugasti	6^{5}	3
(Latvia) Agnese Blumberga (Belgium) Els Callens	6	7^{7}
(Commonwealth of Independent States) Eugenia Maniokova (Commonwealth of Independent States) Viktoria Milvidskaia	3	6^{4}
(United Kingdom) Amanda Evans (Commonwealth of Independent States) Svetlana Parkhomenko	7	7
(United Kingdom) Julie Pullin (United Kingdom) Lorna Woodroffe	5	5
(Netherlands) Gaby Coorengel (Netherlands) Amy van Buuren	6	2	3
4	(Japan) Akiko Kijimuta (Japan) Naoko Sawamatsu	4	6	6

Second round
6	(United States) Lindsay Davenport (United States) Stella Sampras	6	6
(Latvia) Agnese Blumberga (Belgium) Els Callens	3	1
(United Kingdom) Amanda Evans (Commonwealth of Independent States) Svetlana Parkhomenko	3	5
4	(Japan) Akiko Kijimuta (Japan) Naoko Sawamatsu	6	7

Qualifying competition
6	(United States) Lindsay Davenport (United States) Stella Sampras	4	7	4
4	(Japan) Akiko Kijimuta (Japan) Naoko Sawamatsu	6	5	6

=== Fourth qualifier ===
First round
8	(Australia) Danielle Jones (South Africa) Tessa Price	6	6
(Australia) Catherine Barclay (Israel) Anna Smashnova	1	2
(Greece) Christína Papadáki (United States) Tammy Whittington	6	4	3
(United Kingdom) Alison Smith (United Kingdom) Tamsin Wainwright	4	6	6
(United States) Amy deLone (United States) Erika deLone	6	6
(United Kingdom) Caroline Billingham (United Kingdom) Virginia Humphreys-Davies	4	4
(United States) Patti O'Reilly (United States) Terri O'Reilly	3	6	2
2	(United States) Jessica Emmons (United States) Ann Henricksson	6	4	6

Second round
8	(Australia) Danielle Jones (South Africa) Tessa Price	6	6
(United Kingdom) Alison Smith (United Kingdom) Tamsin Wainwright	2	4
(United States) Amy deLone (United States) Erika deLone	6	6
2	(United States) Jessica Emmons (United States) Ann Henricksson	4	3

Qualifying competition
8	(Australia) Danielle Jones (South Africa) Tessa Price	6	6
(United States) Amy deLone (United States) Erika deLone	3	2
