= 1991 Wimbledon Championships – Women's doubles qualifying =

Women's doubles qualifying
- 1991 Wimbledon Championships

Events
| Singles | men | women | | boys | girls |
| Doubles | men | women | mixed | boys | girls |
| WC Singles | men | women | quad |
| WC Doubles | men | women | quad |
| Legends | men | women | seniors |

Qualification
| Singles | men | women |
| Doubles | men | women | mixed |
- Wimbledon Championships

Players and pairs who neither have high enough rankings nor receive wild cards may participate in a qualifying tournament held one week before the annual Wimbledon Tennis Championships.

== Seeds ==
1. (United States) Camille Benjamin / (United States) Tammy Whittington (qualified)
2. (Mexico) Lupita Novelo / (United States) Betsy Somerville (qualifying competition, lucky losers)
3. (Japan) Rika Hiraki / (Japan) Akemi Nishiya (qualified)
4. (France) Julie Halard / (Germany) Anke Huber (qualified)
5. (Japan) Kimiko Date / (Japan) Ei Iida (qualifying competition, lucky losers)
6. (Netherlands) Ingelise Driehuis / (Australia) Louise Pleming (first round)
7. (South Africa) Amanda Coetzer / (South Africa) Robyn Field (second round)
8. (United States) Donna Faber / (New Zealand) Claudine Toleafoa (first round)

== Qualifiers ==
1. (United States) Camille Benjamin / (United States) Tammy Whittington
2. (France) Julie Halard / (Germany) Anke Huber
3. (Japan) Rika Hiraki / (Japan) Akemi Nishiya
4. (United Kingdom) Barbara Griffiths / (United Kingdom) Jane Wood

== Lucky losers ==
1. (Japan) Kimiko Date / (Japan) Ei Iida
2. (Australia) Joanne Limmer / (Australia) Angie Woolcock
3. (Mexico) Lupita Novelo / (United States) Betsy Somerville

== Qualifying draw ==
=== First qualifier ===
First round
1 | (United States) Camille Benjamin (United States) Tammy Whittington | 6 | 6
(United Kingdom) Helen Crook (United Kingdom) Victoria Davies | 4 | 1
(Czechoslovakia) Hana Adámková (Australia) Kerry-Anne Guse | 6 | 6^{2} | 7
(Germany) Meike Babel (Germany) Barbara Rittner | 3 | 7^{7} | 5
(United States) Jessica Emmons (United States) Stacey Schefflin | 3 | 7 | 1
(Australia) Louise Stacey (Australia) Jane Taylor | 6 | 5 | 6
(South Africa) Joannette Kruger (South Africa) Cindy Summers | 0 | 1
5 | (Japan) Kimiko Date (Japan) Ei Iida | 6 | 6

Second round
1 | (United States) Camille Benjamin (United States) Tammy Whittington | 6 | 6^{8} | 7
(Czechoslovakia) Hana Adámková (Australia) Kerry-Anne Guse | 3 | 7^{10} | 5
(Australia) Louise Stacey (Australia) Jane Taylor | 3 | 6^{4}
5 | (Japan) Kimiko Date (Japan) Ei Iida | 6 | 7^{7}

Qualifying competition
1 | (United States) Camille Benjamin (United States) Tammy Whittington | 7 | 1 | 6
5 | (Japan) Kimiko Date (Japan) Ei Iida | 5 | 6 | 1

=== Second qualifier ===
First round
4 | (France) Julie Halard (Germany) Anke Huber | 6 | 6
(Australia) Justine Hodder (Australia) Danielle Jones | 2 | 3
(Sweden) Maria Lindström (United States) Heather Ludloff | 6 | 6
(United Kingdom) Colette Hall (United Kingdom) Shirli-Ann Siddall | 1 | 4
(Netherlands) Dorien Wamelink (Netherlands) Claire Wegink | 1 | 4
(United Kingdom) Caroline Billingham (United Kingdom) Virginia Humphreys-Davies | 6 | 6
(Australia) Joanne Limmer (Australia) Angie Woolcock | 6 | 6
8 | (United States) Donna Faber (New Zealand) Claudine Toleafoa | 0 | 3

Second round
4 | (France) Julie Halard (Germany) Anke Huber
(Sweden) Maria Lindström (United States) Heather Ludloff | w/o
(United Kingdom) Caroline Billingham (United Kingdom) Virginia Humphreys-Davies | 0 | 7^{7} | 3
(Australia) Joanne Limmer (Australia) Angie Woolcock | 6 | 6^{5} | 6

Qualifying competition
4 | (France) Julie Halard (Germany) Anke Huber | 6 | 6
(Australia) Joanne Limmer (Australia) Angie Woolcock | 2 | 3

=== Third qualifier ===
First round
7 | (South Africa) Amanda Coetzer (South Africa) Robyn Field | 6 | 6
WC | (United Kingdom) Kristy Gray (United Kingdom) Julie Pullin | 0 | 2
(Australia) Nicole Pratt (France) Noëlle van Lottum | 4 | 4
(Namibia) Elizma Nortje (Republic of Ireland) Lesley O'Halloran | 6 | 6
(Australia) Catherine Barclay (Australia) Clare Thompson | 7 | 6^{4} | 0
(Greece) Julia Apostoli (Austria) Heidi Sprung | 5 | 7^{7} | 6
(Israel) Ilana Berger (Israel) Limor Zaltz | 4 | 4
3 | (Japan) Rika Hiraki (Japan) Akemi Nishiya | 6 | 6

Second round
7 | (South Africa) Amanda Coetzer (South Africa) Robyn Field | 3 | 6 | 1
(Namibia) Elizma Nortje (Republic of Ireland) Lesley O'Halloran | 6 | 1 | 6
(Greece) Julia Apostoli (Austria) Heidi Sprung | 1 | 7^{7} | 5
3 | (Japan) Rika Hiraki (Japan) Akemi Nishiya | 6 | 6^{5} | 7

Qualifying competition
(Namibia) Elizma Nortje (Republic of Ireland) Lesley O'Halloran | 3 | 2
3 | (Japan) Rika Hiraki (Japan) Akemi Nishiya | 6 | 6

=== Fourth qualifier ===
First round
6 | (Netherlands) Ingelise Driehuis (Australia) Louise Pleming | 5 | 6 | 4
(United Kingdom) Barbara Griffiths (United Kingdom) Jane Wood | 7 | 4 | 6
(United Kingdom) Karen Cross (United Kingdom) Sara Hamplett | 6 | 6
(United Kingdom) Lucie Ahl (United Kingdom) Amanda Wainwright | 4 | 2
(United States) Lynn Nabors (Japan) Tamaka Takagi | 6^{3} | 4
(United States) Andrea Leand (Uruguay) Patricia Miller | 7^{7} | 6
WC | (United Kingdom) Glynis Coles (United Kingdom) Denise Parnell | 0 | 3
2 | (Mexico) Lupita Novelo (United States) Betsy Somerville | 6 | 6

Second round
(United Kingdom) Barbara Griffiths (United Kingdom) Jane Wood | 7 | 6
(United Kingdom) Karen Cross (United Kingdom) Sara Hamplett | 5 | 2
(United States) Andrea Leand (Uruguay) Patricia Miller | 4 | 2
2 | (Mexico) Lupita Novelo (United States) Betsy Somerville | 6 | 6

Qualifying competition
(United Kingdom) Barbara Griffiths (United Kingdom) Jane Wood | 4 | 6 | 6
2 | (Mexico) Lupita Novelo (United States) Betsy Somerville | 6 | 3 | 4
