= 1993 Wimbledon Championships – Women's doubles qualifying =

Women's doubles qualifying
- 1993 Wimbledon Championships

Events
Singles	men	women		boys	girls
Doubles	men	women	mixed	boys	girls
WC Singles	men	women	quad
WC Doubles	men	women	quad
Legends	men	women	seniors

Qualification
Singles	men	women
Doubles	men	women
- Wimbledon Championships

Players and pairs who neither have high enough rankings nor receive wild cards may participate in a qualifying tournament held one week before the annual Wimbledon Tennis Championships.

== Seeds ==
The top 4 seeds received a bye into the second round.

1. (Japan) Ayako Hirose / (Japan) Yone Kamio (second round)
2. (Australia) Jenny Byrne / (Australia) Nicole Pratt (qualified)
3. (United States) Camille Benjamin / (Australia) Tracey Morton (qualifying competition, lucky losers)
4. (Australia) Kate McDonald / (Australia) Kirrily Sharpe (qualified)
5. (United States) Amy deLone / (United States) Erika deLone (second round)
6. (Russia) Natalia Egorova / (Russia) Svetlana Parkhomenko (qualifying competition, lucky losers)
7. (South Africa) Tessa Price / (South Africa) Dinky van Rensburg (qualified)
8. (Australia) Kristin Godridge / (Australia) Joanne Limmer (qualified)

== Qualifiers ==
1. (South Africa) Tessa Price / (South Africa) Dinky van Rensburg
2. (Australia) Kate McDonald / (Australia) Kirrily Sharpe
3. (Australia) Kristin Godridge / (Australia) Joanne Limmer
4. (Australia) Jenny Byrne / (Australia) Nicole Pratt

== Lucky losers ==
1. (Austria) Heidi Sprung / (Australia) Danielle Thomas
2. (Russia) Natalia Egorova / (Russia) Svetlana Parkhomenko
3. (United States) Camille Benjamin / (Australia) Tracey Morton
4. (United Kingdom) Emily Bond / (United Kingdom) Claire Taylor

== Qualifying draw ==
=== First qualifier ===
First round
1	(Japan) Ayako Hirose (Japan) Yone Kamio
bye
(Austria) Heidi Sprung (Australia) Danielle Thomas	3	6	8
(Japan) Mana Endo (Japan) Misumi Miyauchi	6	4	6
(United Kingdom) Libby Fletcher (United Kingdom) Candy Reid	2	4
(Netherlands) Gaby Coorengel (Netherlands) Amy van Buuren	6	6
(Sweden) Åsa Carlsson (Netherlands) Linda Niemantsverdriet	w/o
7	(South Africa) Tessa Price (South Africa) Dinky van Rensburg

Second round
1	(Japan) Ayako Hirose (Japan) Yone Kamio	6^{2}	4
(Austria) Heidi Sprung (Australia) Danielle Thomas	7^{7}	6
(Netherlands) Gaby Coorengel (Netherlands) Amy van Buuren	5	1
7	(South Africa) Tessa Price (South Africa) Dinky van Rensburg	7	6

Qualifying competition
(Austria) Heidi Sprung (Australia) Danielle Thomas	3	0
7	(South Africa) Tessa Price (South Africa) Dinky van Rensburg	6	6

=== Second qualifier ===
First round
2	(Australia) Kate McDonald (Australia) Kirrily Sharpe
bye
(United Kingdom) Alison Smith (Netherlands) Caroline Stassen	2	6^{3}
(United States) Donna Faber (Japan) Ai Sugiyama	6	7^{7}
(Madagascar) Dally Randriantefy (United Kingdom) Katia Roubanova	7	0	1
(United Kingdom) Karen Cross (Namibia) Elizma Nortje	5	6	6
(South Africa) Rikki Gaddie (South Africa) Toni Gaddie	1	0
6	(Russia) Natalia Egorova (Russia) Svetlana Parkhomenko	6	6

Second round
2	(Australia) Kate McDonald (Australia) Kirrily Sharpe	6	6
(United States) Donna Faber (Japan) Ai Sugiyama	4	0
(United Kingdom) Karen Cross (Namibia) Elizma Nortje	6^{3}	6^{5}
6	(Russia) Natalia Egorova (Russia) Svetlana Parkhomenko	7^{7}	7^{7}

Qualifying competition
2	(Australia) Kate McDonald (Australia) Kirrily Sharpe	6	6
6	(Russia) Natalia Egorova (Russia) Svetlana Parkhomenko	3	4

=== Third qualifier ===
First round
8	(Australia) Kristin Godridge (Australia) Joanne Limmer	6	5	6
(Germany) Marketa Kochta (Germany) Caroline Schneider	3	7	1
(United Kingdom) Lucie Ahl (United Kingdom) Caroline Billingham	6	6
WC	(United Kingdom) Tina Croson (United Kingdom) Imogen Wyatt	2	1
(Australia) Robyn Mawdsley (Australia) Shannon Peters	w/o
(France) Sophie Amiach (Japan) Masako Yanagi
bye
3	(United States) Camille Benjamin (Australia) Tracey Morton

Second round
8	(Australia) Kristin Godridge (Australia) Joanne Limmer	7	6
(United Kingdom) Lucie Ahl (United Kingdom) Caroline Billingham	5	4
(France) Sophie Amiach (Japan) Masako Yanagi	3	2
3	(United States) Camille Benjamin (Australia) Tracey Morton	6	6

Qualifying competition
8	(Australia) Kristin Godridge (Australia) Joanne Limmer	6	6
3	(United States) Camille Benjamin (Australia) Tracey Morton	3	1

=== Fourth qualifier ===
First round
5	(United States) Amy deLone (United States) Erika deLone	6	3	6
(United Kingdom) Colette Hall (United Kingdom) Shirli-Ann Siddall	4	6	1
(United Kingdom) Emily Bond (United Kingdom) Claire Taylor
(Slovenia) Tina Križan (Republic of Ireland) Siobhán Nicholson	w/o
(United States) Carrie Cunningham (United States) Tami Whitlinger	6	6
(Belgium) Laurence Courtois (United States) Julie Steven	4	2
bye
2	(Australia) Jenny Byrne (Australia) Nicole Pratt

Second round
5	(United States) Amy deLone (United States) Erika deLone	6^{6}	6	6
(United Kingdom) Emily Bond (United Kingdom) Claire Taylor	7^{8}	1	6
(United States) Carrie Cunningham (United States) Tami Whitlinger	2	4
2	(Australia) Jenny Byrne (Australia) Nicole Pratt	6	6

Qualifying competition
(United Kingdom) Emily Bond (United Kingdom) Claire Taylor	1	2
2	(Australia) Jenny Byrne (Australia) Nicole Pratt	6	6
