= 1992 Wimbledon Championships – Women's singles qualifying =

Women's singles qualifying
- 1992 Wimbledon Championships

Events
Singles	men	women		boys	girls
Doubles	men	women	mixed	boys	girls
WC Singles	men	women	quad
WC Doubles	men	women	quad
Legends	men	women	seniors

Qualification
Singles	men	women
Doubles	men	women
- Wimbledon Championships

Players and pairs who neither have high enough rankings nor receive wild cards may participate in a qualifying tournament held one week before the annual Wimbledon Tennis Championships.

== Seeds ==
1. (Japan) Akiko Kijimuta (second round)
2. (United States) Tammy Whittington (qualifying competition, lucky loser)
3. (United States) Peanut Harper (first round)
4. (Japan) Rika Hiraki (qualified)
5. (Australia) Elizabeth Smylie (second round)
6. (Japan) Yone Kamio (second round)
7. (Australia) Louise Field (qualified)
8. (Argentina) Cristina Tessi (qualified)
9. (Australia) Jo-Anne Faull (qualifying competition, lucky loser)
10. (Belgium) Els Callens (second round)
11. (Mexico) Angélica Gavaldón (first round)
12. (United States) Erika deLone (first round)
13. (Australia) Michelle Jaggard-Lai (first round)
14. (Germany) Karin Kschwendt (qualified)
15. (Sweden) Maria Strandlund (qualifying competition)
16. (Belgium) Ann Devries (qualified)

== Qualifiers ==
1. (Netherlands) Miriam Oremans
2. (United States) Jennifer Santrock
3. (Japan) Rika Hiraki
4. (Argentina) Cristina Tessi
5. (Australia) Louise Field
6. (Belgium) Ann Devries
7. (Netherlands) Claire Wegink
8. (Germany) Karin Kschwendt

== Lucky losers ==
1. (Australia) Jo-Anne Faull
2. (United States) Tammy Whittington

== Qualifying draw ==
=== First qualifier ===
First round
1	(Japan) Akiko Kijimuta	6	6
(Republic of Ireland) Siobhán Nicholson	3	3
(Australia) Kerry-Anne Guse	1	5
(Australia) Kristine Radford	6	7
(United States) Cammy MacGregor	6	3	8
(Germany) Christina Singer	4	6	6
(Netherlands) Miriam Oremans	6	6
13	(Australia) Michelle Jaggard-Lai	1	2

Second round
1	(Japan) Akiko Kijimuta	3	3
(Australia) Kristine Radford	6	6
(United States) Cammy MacGregor	5	6	3
(Netherlands) Miriam Oremans	7	3	6

Qualifying competition
(Australia) Kristine Radford	4	0
(Netherlands) Miriam Oremans	6	6

=== Second qualifier ===
First round
11	(Mexico) Angélica Gavaldón	0	6^{1}
(United States) Ann Henricksson	6	7^{7}
(Germany) Eva Pfaff	6	6^{2}	2
(United States) Nicole Arendt	3	7^{7}	6
(United States) Jennifer Santrock	7^{7}	6
(United States) Lindsay Davenport	6^{3}	2
(Greece) Christína Papadáki	1	4
6	(Japan) Yone Kamio	6	6

Second round
(United States) Ann Henricksson	6	6
(United States) Nicole Arendt	4	4
(United States) Jennifer Santrock	5	6	6
6	(Japan) Yone Kamio	7	1	2

Qualifying competition
(United States) Ann Henricksson	7^{7}	5	4
(United States) Jennifer Santrock	6^{4}	7	6

=== Third qualifier ===
First round
4	(Japan) Rika Hiraki	6	6
(Spain) Bárbara Navarro	2	2
(Spain) Ana Segura	6	6
(New Zealand) Claudine Toleafoa	3	3
WC	(United Kingdom) Barbara Griffiths	6	4	2
(Commonwealth of Independent States) Viktoria Milvidskaia	2	6	6
(United States) Shaun Stafford	2	2
15	(Sweden) Maria Strandlund	6	6

Second round
4	(Japan) Rika Hiraki	6	6
(Spain) Ana Segura	2	0
(Commonwealth of Independent States) Viktoria Milvidskaia	6^{4}	6^{5}
15	(Sweden) Maria Strandlund	7^{7}	7^{7}

Qualifying competition
4	(Japan) Rika Hiraki	6	3	9
15	(Sweden) Maria Strandlund	4	6	7

=== Fourth qualifier ===
First round
9	(Australia) Jo-Anne Faull	6	7
(United States) Pam Nelson	4	5
(Italy) Elena Savoldi	6^{3}	2
(France) Agnès Zugasti	7^{7}	6
(United States) Sandy Collins	7	3	8
WC	(United States) Betsy Nagelsen	5	6	6
(Netherlands) Petra Kamstra	2	3
8	(Argentina) Cristina Tessi	6	6

Second round
9	(Australia) Jo-Anne Faull	6	6
(France) Agnès Zugasti	2	3
(United States) Sandy Collins	3	6^{4}
8	(Argentina) Cristina Tessi	6	7^{7}

Qualifying competition
9	(Australia) Jo-Anne Faull	7^{9}	3	3
8	(Argentina) Cristina Tessi	6^{7}	6	6

=== Fifth qualifier ===
First round
7	(Australia) Louise Field	6	6
(Japan) Ayako Hirose	1	4
WC	(United Kingdom) Caroline Herbert	3	6	5
(United States) Jessica Emmons	6	2	7
(United States) Patti O'Reilly	2	0
(Netherlands) Ingelise Driehuis	6	6
(Australia) Louise Stacey	0	4
10	(Belgium) Els Callens	6	6

Second round
7	(Australia) Louise Field	6	6
(United States) Jessica Emmons	3	2
(Netherlands) Ingelise Driehuis	6	6
10	(Belgium) Els Callens	4	4

Qualifying competition
7	(Australia) Louise Field	6	2	6
(Netherlands) Ingelise Driehuis	4	6	3

=== Sixth qualifier ===
First round
16	(Belgium) Ann Devries	6	7
(United States) Elise Burgin	4	5
(South Africa) Joannette Kruger	2	6	6
(Spain) Neus Ávila	6	2	4
(Netherlands) Carin Bakkum	5	0
(Spain) Silvia Ramón-Cortés	7	6
(Israel) Anna Smashnova	7	0	7
3	(United States) Peanut Harper	5	6	5

Second round
16	(Belgium) Ann Devries	6	3	6
(South Africa) Joannette Kruger	3	6	1
(Spain) Silvia Ramón-Cortés	6	6
(Israel) Anna Smashnova	4	3

Qualifying competition
16	(Belgium) Ann Devries	6	6
(Spain) Silvia Ramón-Cortés	3	4

=== Seventh qualifier ===
First round
5/WC	(Australia) Elizabeth Smylie	4	7	6
WC	(United Kingdom) Julie Salmon	6	5	2
(Netherlands) Claire Wegink	6	6
(Austria) Heidi Sprung	0	3
WC	(United Kingdom) Julie Pullin	6	6
(Germany) Tanja Hauschildt	3	2
(United States) Camille Benjamin	6	6
12	(United States) Erika deLone	4	2

Second round
5/WC	(Australia) Elizabeth Smylie	6	2	4
(Netherlands) Claire Wegink	3	6	6
WC	(United Kingdom) Julie Pullin	4	6	2
(United States) Camille Benjamin	6	4	6

Qualifying competition
(Netherlands) Claire Wegink	6	2	6
(United States) Camille Benjamin	4	6	3

=== Eighth qualifier ===
First round
14	(Germany) Karin Kschwendt	7^{7}	6
(Japan) Ei Iida	6^{4}	1
(Australia) Kirrily Sharpe	3	6	6
(Japan) Tamaka Takagi	6	3	4
WC	(United Kingdom) Tamsin Wainwright	6	2	4
WC	(United Kingdom) Caroline Billingham	3	6	6
(Mexico) Lupita Novelo	2	6	1
2	(United States) Tammy Whittington	6	4	6

Second round
14	(Germany) Karin Kschwendt	6	7^{7}
(Australia) Kirrily Sharpe	3	6^{3}
WC	(United Kingdom) Caroline Billingham	1	2
2	(United States) Tammy Whittington	6	6

Qualifying competition
14	(Germany) Karin Kschwendt	6^{1}	6	6
2	(United States) Tammy Whittington	7^{7}	4	3
