= 1993 French Open – Women's doubles =

Women's doubles
- 1993 French Open

Final
- Champion: (United States) Gigi Fernández; (Belarus) Natasha Zvereva
- Runner-up: (Latvia) Larisa Savchenko; (Czech Republic) Jana Novotná
- Score: 6–3, 7–5

Details
- Draw: 64 (4 WC )
- Seeds: 16

Events
Singles	men	women		boys	girls
Doubles	men	women	mixed	boys	girls
WC Singles	men	women	quad
WC Doubles	men	women	quad
Legends	−45	45+	women
← 1992 ·	French Open	· 1994 →

Gigi Fernández and Natasha Zvereva were the defending champions, and successfully defended their title, defeating Larisa Savchenko and Jana Novotná in the final 6–3, 7–5.

== Seeds ==
1. (United States) Gigi Fernández / (Belarus) Natasha Zvereva (champions)
2. (Latvia) Larisa Savchenko / (Czechoslovakia) Jana Novotná (final)
3. (Spain) Conchita Martínez / (Spain) Arantxa Sánchez Vicario (quarterfinals)
4. (United States) Lori McNeil / (Australia) Rennae Stubbs (quarterfinals)
5. (United States) Mary Joe Fernández / (United States) Zina Garrison-Jackson (third round)
6. (United States) Pam Shriver / (Australia) Elizabeth Smylie (second round)
7. (Canada) Jill Hetherington / (United States) Kathy Rinaldi (first round)
8. (United States) Katrina Adams / (Netherlands) Manon Bollegraf (quarterfinals)
9. (France) Mary Pierce / (Czech Republic) Andrea Strnadová (first round)
10. (Bulgaria) Magdalena Maleeva / (Switzerland) Manuela Maleeva-Fragnière (third round)
11. (France) Isabelle Demongeot / (South Africa) Elna Reinach (third round)
12. (Russia) Eugenia Maniokova / (Georgia (country)) Leila Meskhi (third round)
13. (South Africa) Amanda Coetzer / (Argentina) Inés Gorrochategui (semifinals)
14. (United States) Debbie Graham / (Netherlands) Brenda Schultz (third round)
15. (Argentina) Florencia Labat / (Argentina) Mercedes Paz (first round)
16. (Italy) Linda Ferrando / (Czech Republic) Petra Langrová (first round)

== Draw ==
=== Key ===
- Q = Qualifier
- WC = Wild card
- LL = Lucky loser
- Alt = Alternate
- SE = Special exempt
- PR = Protected ranking
- ITF = ITF entry
- JE = Junior exempt
- w/o = Walkover
- r = Retired
- d = Defaulted
- SR = Special ranking

=== Finals ===
Quarterfinals

Semifinals

Final

1
(United States) Gigi Fernández
(Belarus) Natasha Zvereva
6
3
7

8
- (United States) Katrina Adams
- (Netherlands) Manon Bollegraf
4
6
5

1
(United States) Gigi Fernández
(Belarus) Natasha Zvereva
7
7

- (Italy) Sandra Cecchini
- (Argentina) Patricia Tarabini
6^{1}
5

4
- (United States) Lori McNeil
- (Australia) Rennae Stubbs
3
6
3

(Italy) Sandra Cecchini
(Argentina) Patricia Tarabini
6
4
6

1
(United States) Gigi Fernández
(Belarus) Natasha Zvereva
6
7

2
- (Latvia) Larisa Savchenko
- (Czech Republic) Jana Novotná
3
5

13
(South Africa) Amanda Coetzer
(Argentina) Inés Gorrochategui
7
3
7

3
- (Spain) Conchita Martínez
- (Spain) Arantxa Sánchez Vicario
6^{6}
6
5

13
- (South Africa) Amanda Coetzer
- (Argentina) Inés Gorrochategui
4
7
5

2
(Latvia) Larisa Savchenko
(Czech Republic) Jana Novotná
6
6^{1}
7

- (Bulgaria) Katerina Maleeva
- (France) Nathalie Tauziat
4
6^{2}

2
(Latvia) Larisa Savchenko
(Czech Republic) Jana Novotná
6
7

=== Top half ===
==== Section 1 ====
First round

Second round

Third round

Quarterfinals

1
(United States) G Fernández
(Belarus) N Zvereva
6
6

- (United States) L Harvey-Wild
- (Australia) N Provis
2
4

1
(United States) G Fernández
(Belarus) N Zvereva
6
6

- (Australia) T Morton
- (United Kingdom) C Wood
5
3

- (Netherlands) M Oremans
- (Netherlands) C Vis
4
3

(Netherlands) M Oremans
(Netherlands) C Vis
7
6

1
(United States) G Fernández
(Belarus) N Zvereva
6
6

(United States) J Emmons
(United States) G Helgeson
6
4
6

10
- (Bulgaria) M Maleeva
- (Switzerland) M Maleeva-Fragnière
4
1

- (Austria) S Dopfer
- (Germany) C Schneider
0
6
2

- (United States) J Emmons
- (United States) G Helgeson
4
6
4

- (Australia) M Jaggard-Lai
- (New Zealand) J Richardson
2
4

10
(Bulgaria) M Maleeva
(Switzerland) M Maleeva-Fragnière
6
2
6

10
(Bulgaria) M Maleeva
(Switzerland) M Maleeva-Fragnière
6
6

1
(United States) G Fernández
(Belarus) N Zvereva
6
3
7

14
(United States) D Graham
(Netherlands) B Schultz
6
6

8
- (United States) K Adams
- (Netherlands) M Bollegraf
4
6
5

- (United States) S Collins
- (Austria) J Wiesner
3
1

14
(United States) D Graham
(Netherlands) B Schultz
6
7

- (Netherlands) M Kiene
- (United States) P O'Reilly
5
2

- (Czech Republic) R Bobková
- (Argentina) MJ Gaidano
4
6^{5}

(Czech Republic) R Bobková
(Argentina) MJ Gaidano
7
6

14
- (United States) D Graham
- (Netherlands) B Schultz
2
0

- (United States) J Fuchs
- (Sweden) M Strandlund
6^{4}
6
7

8
(United States) K Adams
(Netherlands) M Bollegraf
6
6

(Sweden) M Lindström
(United States) T Whittington
7
0
9

- (Sweden) M Lindström
- (United States) T Whittington
5
0

- (Japan) R Hiraki
- (Japan) N Miyagi
3
4

8
(United States) K Adams
(Netherlands) M Bollegraf
7
6

8
(United States) K Adams
(Netherlands) M Bollegraf
6
6

==== Section 2 ====
First round

Second round

Third round

Quarterfinals

4
(United States) L McNeil
(Australia) R Stubbs
6
7

- (Australia) JA Faull
- (Australia) A Woolcock
2
5

4
(United States) L McNeil
(Australia) R Stubbs
6
6

- (France) P Paradis-Mangon
- (France) S Testud
7
5
2

- (Australia) K Godridge
- (Japan) M Kidowaki
2
3

(Australia) K Godridge
(Japan) M Kidowaki
6^{7}
7
6

4
(United States) L McNeil
(Australia) R Stubbs
6
4
6

(United States) S Stafford
(Hungary) A Temesvári
5
7
6

- (United States) S Stafford
- (Hungary) A Temesvári
3
6
4

- (United States) L Davenport
- (United States) M Werdel
7
5
4

(United States) S Stafford
(Hungary) A Temesvári
7
6

- (Japan) K Date
- (Germany) K Kschwendt
3
7
8

- (Japan) K Date
- (Germany) K Kschwendt
5
2

15
(Argentina) F Labat
(Argentina) M Paz
6
6^{3}
6

4
- (United States) L McNeil
- (Australia) R Stubbs
3
6
3

12
(Russia) E Maniokova
(Georgia (country)) L Meskhi
6
6^{3}
6

(Italy) S Cecchini
(Argentina) P Tarabini
6
4
6

- (Finland) N Dahlman
- (Australia) L Field
2
7
0

12
(Russia) E Maniokova
(Georgia (country)) L Meskhi
6
6

(Slovakia) K Habšudová
(Slovakia) R Zrubáková
6
6

- (Slovakia) K Habšudová
- (Slovakia) R Zrubáková
2
3

- (United States) E Burgin
- (Peru) L Gildemeister
1
2

12
- (Russia) E Maniokova
- (Georgia (country)) L Meskhi
1
5

- (Italy) L Garrone
- (Germany) B Rittner
4
2

(Italy) S Cecchini
(Argentina) P Tarabini
6
7

(Italy) S Cecchini
(Argentina) P Tarabini
6
6

(Italy) S Cecchini
(Argentina) P Tarabini
6
6

- (United States) P Fendick
- (United States) M McGrath
3
6^{5}

8
- (United States) P Shriver
- (Australia) E Smylie
2
2

8
(United States) P Shriver
(Australia) E Smylie
6
7

=== Bottom half ===
==== Section 3 ====
First round

Second round

Third round

Quarterfinals

5
(United States) MJ Fernández
(United States) Z Garrison-Jackson
4
6
6

- (Australia) J Byrne
- (Australia) N Pratt
6
4
4

5
(United States) MJ Fernández
(United States) Z Garrison-Jackson
7
6

(Netherlands) N Kruger-Jagerman
(Australia) L Pleming
6
6

- (Netherlands) N Kruger-Jagerman
- (Australia) L Pleming
6^{3}
1

- (Austria) P Ritter
- (France) N van Lottum
1
2

5
- (United States) MJ Fernández
- (United States) Z Garrison-Jackson
4
6
4

- (Netherlands) I Driehuis
- (Mexico) L Novelo
6
2
0

13
(South Africa) A Coetzer
(Argentina) I Gorrochategui
6
3
6

(Belgium) S Appelmans
(Belgium) L Courtois
3
6
6

- (Belgium) S Appelmans
- (Belgium) L Courtois
2
1

- (France) J Halard
- (Germany) A Huber
4
6
3

13
(South Africa) A Coetzer
(Argentina) I Gorrochategui
6
6

13
(South Africa) A Coetzer
(Argentina) I Gorrochategui
6
1
6

13
(South Africa) A Coetzer
(Argentina) I Gorrochategui
7
3
7

9
- (France) M Pierce
- (Czech Republic) A Strnadová
6
5
4

3
- (Spain) C Martínez
- (Spain) A Sánchez Vicario
6^{6}
6
5

(Australia) R McQuillan
(Germany) C Porwik
2
7
6

(Australia) R McQuillan
(Germany) C Porwik
4
6
6

(United States) S McCarthy
(United States) K Po
6
4
6

- (United States) S McCarthy
- (United States) K Po
6
2
3

WC
- (France) S Amiach
- (France) K Quentrec
3
6
4

- (Australia) R McQuillan
- (Germany) C Porwik
4
1

WC
- (Japan) K Nagatsuka
- (France) C Tanvier
4
7
0

3
(Spain) C Martínez
(Spain) A Sánchez Vicario
6
6

(United States) A Grossman
(Canada) P Hy
6
5
6

- (United States) A Grossman
- (Canada) P Hy
1
0

- (United States) B Nagelsen
- (South Africa) R Nideffer
3
3

3
(Spain) C Martínez
(Spain) A Sánchez Vicario
6
6

3
(Spain) C Martínez
(Spain) A Sánchez Vicario
6
6

==== Section 4 ====
First round

Second round

Third round

Quarterfinals

7
- (Canada) J Hetherington
- (United States) K Rinaldi
2
3

(Ukraine) E Brioukhovets
(Ukraine) N Medvedeva
6
6

- (Ukraine) E Brioukhovets
- (Ukraine) N Medvedeva
4
2

(Bulgaria) K Maleeva
(France) N Tauziat
7
3
6

(Bulgaria) K Maleeva
(France) N Tauziat
6
6

- (Indonesia) Y Basuki
- (Netherlands) K Boogert
6^{4}
6
3

(Bulgaria) K Maleeva
(France) N Tauziat
6
6

(Australia) C Barclay
(Australia) KA Guse
3
6
6

- (Australia) C Barclay
- (Australia) KA Guse
2
4

- (United States) L Allen
- (United States) A Henricksson
6
2
3

(Australia) C Barclay
(Australia) KA Guse
4
6
6

- (Australia) J Hodder
- (Finland) P Thorén
3
2

16
- (Italy) L Ferrando
- (Czech Republic) P Langrová
6
4
1

16
(Italy) L Ferrando
(Czech Republic) P Langrová
6
6

- (Bulgaria) K Maleeva
- (France) N Tauziat
4
6^{2}

11
(France) I Demongeot
(South Africa) E Reinach
6
6

2
(Latvia) L Savchenko
(Czech Republic) J Novotná
6
7

WC
- (France) L Ghirardi
- (France) S Sabas
1
4

11
(France) I Demongeot
(South Africa) E Reinach
6
6

- (Australia) K Radford
- (Czech Republic) E Švíglerová
4
3

- (France) A Fusai
- (France) C Suire
1
4

(France) A Fusai
(France) C Suire
6
6

11
- (France) I Demongeot
- (South Africa) E Reinach
2
4

(Bulgaria) E Pampoulova
(Spain) V Ruano Pascual
1
7
6

2
(Latvia) L Savchenko
(Czech Republic) J Novotná
6
6

WC
- (France) N Housset Gilbert
- (France) S Niox-Château
6
5
0

- (Bulgaria) E Pampoulova
- (Spain) V Ruano Pascual
3
2

- (Germany) W Probst
- (Germany) C Singer
4
2

2
(Latvia) L Savchenko
(Czech Republic) J Novotná
6
6

2
(Latvia) L Savchenko
(Czech Republic) J Novotná
6
6
