= 1994 Australian Open – Women's doubles =

Women's doubles
- 1994 Australian Open

Final
- Champion: (United States) Gigi Fernández (Belarus) Natasha Zvereva
- Runner-up: (United States) Patty Fendick (United States) Meredith McGrath
- Score: 6–3, 4–6, 6–4

Details
- Draw: 64
- Seeds: 16

Events
| Singles | men | women | | boys | girls |
| Doubles | men | women | mixed | boys | girls |
| WC Singles | men | women | quad |
| WC Doubles | men | women | quad |
| Legends | men | women | mixed |
- Australian Open

The women's doubles competition at the 1994 Australian Open was held between 17 January and 30 January 1994 on outdoor hard courts at the National Tennis Centre at Flinders Park in Melbourne, Australia. Gigi Fernández and Natasha Zvereva won the title, defeating Patty Fendick and Meredith McGrath in the final.

== Seeds ==
1. (United States) Gigi Fernández / (Belarus) Natasha Zvereva (champions)
2. (Czech Republic) Jana Novotná / (Spain) Arantxa Sánchez Vicario (semifinals)
3. (United States) Pam Shriver / (Australia) Elizabeth Smylie (semifinals)
4. (Switzerland) Manuela Maleeva-Fragniere / (Czech Republic) Helena Suková (third round)
5. (Spain) Conchita Martínez / (Latvia) Larisa Neiland (third round)
6. (United States) Mary Joe Fernández / (United States) Zina Garrison-Jackson (quarterfinals)
7. (United States) Patty Fendick / (United States) Meredith McGrath (final)
8. (United States) Katrina Adams / (United States) Kathy Rinaldi-Stunkel (second round)
9. (South Africa) Amanda Coetzer / (Argentina) Inés Gorrochategui (third round)
10. (Netherlands) Manon Bollegraf / (United States) Debbie Graham (quarterfinals)
11. (South Africa) Elna Reinach / (Czech Republic) Andrea Strnadová (third round)
12. (Italy) Laura Golarsa / (Ukraine) Natalia Medvedeva (third round)
13. (Russia) Eugenia Maniokova / (Georgia (country)) Leila Meskhi (third round)
14. (United States) Ann Grossman / (New Zealand) Julie Richardson (quarterfinals)
15. (United States) Lindsay Davenport / (United States) Lisa Raymond (third round)
16. (Canada) Jill Hetherington / (United States) Shaun Stafford (quarterfinals)

== Draw ==
Key

- Q = Qualifier
- WC = Wild card
- LL = Lucky loser
- Alt = Alternate
- ITF = ITF entry
- PR = Protected ranking
- SR = Special ranking
- SE = Special exempt
- JE = Junior exempt
- JR = Junior Accelerator Programme entrant
- CO = College Accelerator Programme entrant
- NG = Next Gen Accelerator Program entrant
- w/o = Walkover
- r = Retired
- d = Defaulted

=== Finals ===
Quarterfinals
1 | (United States) Gigi Fernández (Belarus) Natasha Zvereva | 6 | 6
10 | (Netherlands) Manon Bollegraf (United States) Debbie Graham | 1 | 3
3 | (United States) Pam Shriver (Australia) Elizabeth Smylie | 6 | 6
16 | (Canada) Jill Hetherington (United States) Shaun Stafford | 3 | 2
7 | (United States) Patty Fendick (United States) Meredith McGrath | 6 | 6
14 | (United States) Ann Grossman (New Zealand) Julie Richardson | 2 | 0
6 | (United States) Mary Joe Fernández (United States) Zina Garrison-Jackson | 4 | 4
2 | (Czech Republic) Jana Novotná (Spain) Arantxa Sánchez Vicario | 6 | 6

Semifinals
1 | (United States) Gigi Fernández (Belarus) Natasha Zvereva | 6 | 6
3 | (United States) Pam Shriver (Australia) Elizabeth Smylie | 3 | 3
7 | (United States) Patty Fendick (United States) Meredith McGrath | 6 | 7
2 | (Czech Republic) Jana Novotná (Spain) Arantxa Sánchez Vicario | 3 | 5

Final
1 | (United States) Gigi Fernández (Belarus) Natasha Zvereva | 6 | 4 | 6
7 | (United States) Patty Fendick (United States) Meredith McGrath | 3 | 6 | 4

=== Top half ===
==== Section 1 ====
First round
1 | (United States) G Fernández (Belarus) N Zvereva | 6 | 6
(Germany) V Martinek (Poland) M Mróz | 2 | 4
(United States) A deLone (United States) E deLone | 1 | 6 | 5
(United Kingdom) V Lake (United Kingdom) C Wood | 6 | 3 | 7
(Sweden) Å Carlsson (Romania) C Cristea | 7 | 3 | 6
(Kazakhstan) E Likhovtseva (Russia) E Makarova | 5 | 6 | 3
(Germany) K Kschwendt (Argentina) F Labat | 6 | 3 | 1
13 | (Russia) E Maniokova (Georgia (country)) L Meskhi | 4 | 6 | 6
10 | (Netherlands) M Bollegraf (United States) D Graham | 7 | 6
(Bulgaria) K Maleeva (Germany) B Rittner | 6^{5} | 3
WC | (Germany) S Graf (Argentina) P Tarabini | 6 | 7
(Argentina) MJ Gaidano (France) S Testud | 3 | 5
(Belgium) L Courtois (Belgium) N Feber | 7 | 1 | 3
(Australia) JA Faull (United States) R White | 6^{5} | 6 | 6
(United States) E Hakami (United States) S Reece | 2 | 2
5 | (Spain) C Martínez (Latvia) L Neiland | 6 | 6

Second round
1 | (United States) G Fernández (Belarus) N Zvereva | 6 | 6
(United Kingdom) V Lake (United Kingdom) C Wood | 1 | 2
(Sweden) Å Carlsson (Romania) C Cristea | 2 | 0
13 | (Russia) E Maniokova (Georgia (country)) L Meskhi | 6 | 6
10 | (Netherlands) M Bollegraf (United States) D Graham | 7 | 6
(Germany) S Graf (Argentina) P Tarabini | 6^{5} | 3
(Australia) JA Faull (United States) R White | 2 | 1
5 | (Spain) C Martínez (Latvia) L Neiland | 6 | 6

Third round
1 | (United States) G Fernández (Belarus) N Zvereva | 6 | 6
13 | (Russia) E Maniokova (Georgia (country)) L Meskhi | 2 | 1
10 | (Netherlands) M Bollegraf (United States) D Graham | 6 | 6
5 | (Spain) C Martínez (Latvia) L Neiland | 3 | 4

Quarterfinals
1 | (United States) G Fernández (Belarus) N Zvereva | 6 | 6
10 | (Netherlands) M Bollegraf (United States) D Graham | 1 | 3

==== Section 2 ====
First round
3 | (United States) P Shriver (Australia) E Smylie | 6 | 6
(China) F Li (Belgium) D Monami | 3 | 1
(Slovakia) K Habšudová (Slovakia) J Husárová | 7 | 3 | 4
(Australia) K McDonald (Australia) N Pratt | 6^{3} | 6 | 6
(Austria) S Dopfer (Slovenia) T Križan | 2 | 1
(United States) L Harvey Wild (United States) C Rubin | 6 | 6
(Finland) N Dahlman (Australia) K Sharpe | 4 | 4
12 | (Italy) L Golarsa (Ukraine) N Medvedeva | 6 | 6
16 | (Canada) J Hetherington (United States) S Stafford | 6 | 6
(Australia) J Byrne (Australia) R McQuillan | 6^{6} | 1
(Canada) P Hy (Argentina) M Paz | 4 | 6 | 0
(Australia) C Barclay (Australia) KA Guse | 6 | 2 | 6
(Australia) M Jaggard-Lai (Canada) R Simpson-Alter | 0 | 3
(United States) N Arendt (Australia) K Radford | 6 | 6
(Indonesia) Y Basuki (Japan) N Miyagi | 5 | 3
8 | (United States) K Adams (United States) K Rinaldi-Stunkel | 7 | 6

Second round
3 | (United States) P Shriver (Australia) E Smylie | 7 | 6
(Australia) K McDonald (Australia) N Pratt | 5 | 3
(United States) L Harvey Wild (United States) C Rubin | 4 | 5
12 | (Italy) L Golarsa (Ukraine) N Medvedeva | 6 | 7
16 | (Canada) J Hetherington (United States) S Stafford | 6 | 4 | 6
(Australia) C Barclay (Australia) KA Guse | 0 | 6 | 4
(United States) N Arendt (Australia) K Radford | 6 | 6
8 | (United States) K Adams (United States) K Rinaldi-Stunkel | 2 | 3

Third round
3 | (United States) P Shriver (Australia) E Smylie | 6 | 2 | 6
12 | (Italy) L Golarsa (Ukraine) N Medvedeva | 3 | 6 | 4
16 | (Canada) J Hetherington (United States) S Stafford | 6 | 6
(United States) N Arendt (Australia) K Radford | 2 | 3

Quarterfinals
3 | (United States) P Shriver (Australia) E Smylie | 6 | 6
16 | (Canada) J Hetherington (United States) S Stafford | 3 | 2

=== Bottom half ===
==== Section 3 ====
First round
7 | (United States) P Fendick (United States) M McGrath | 6 | 6
(Czech Republic) R Bobková (Czech Republic) P Langrová | 1 | 4
(Japan) A Kijimuta (Japan) N Kijimuta | 6 | 6
WC | (Australia) K Godridge (Australia) J Limmer | 3 | 1
WC | (Australia) M Avotins (Australia) L McShea | 1 | 3
(Belgium) S Appelmans (Slovakia) R Zrubáková | 6 | 6
(United States) G Helgeson (United States) S McCarthy | 5 | 6^{3}
9 | (South Africa) A Coetzer (Argentina) I Gorrochategui | 7 | 7
14 | (United States) A Grossman (New Zealand) J Richardson | 6 | 6
(Austria) P Ritter (France) N van Lottum | 2 | 3
(United States) J Emmons (South Africa) T Price | 6 | 6
WC | (Australia) L Field (United States) A Henricksson | 0 | 4
WC | (Australia) R Mawdsley (Australia) T Morton | 6 | 4 | 4
(United States) C Kuhlman (Australia) L Pleming | 1 | 6 | 6
(Australia) D Jones (Japan) M Kidowaki | 3 | 3
4 | (Switzerland) M Maleeva-Fragniere (Czech Republic) H Suková | 6 | 6

Second round
7 | (United States) P Fendick (United States) M McGrath | 6 | 6
(Japan) A Kijimuta (Japan) N Kijimuta | 2 | 4
(Belgium) S Appelmans (Slovakia) R Zrubáková | 6 | 2 | 2
9 | (South Africa) A Coetzer (Argentina) I Gorrochategui | 2 | 6 | 6
14 | (United States) A Grossman (New Zealand) J Richardson | 6 | 6
(United States) J Emmons (South Africa) T Price | 4 | 2
(United States) C Kuhlman (Australia) L Pleming | 6 | 6^{3} | 3
4 | (Switzerland) M Maleeva-Fragniere (Czech Republic) H Suková | 3 | 7 | 6

Third round
7 | (United States) P Fendick (United States) M McGrath | 4 | 6 | 6
9 | (South Africa) A Coetzer (Argentina) I Gorrochategui | 6 | 4 | 1
14 | (United States) A Grossman (New Zealand) J Richardson | 6 | 6
4 | (Switzerland) M Maleeva-Fragniere (Czech Republic) H Suková | 1 | 4

Quarterfinals
7 | (United States) P Fendick (United States) M McGrath | 6 | 6
14 | (United States) A Grossman (New Zealand) J Richardson | 2 | 0

==== Section 4 ====
First round
6 | (United States) MJ Fernández (United States) Z Garrison-Jackson | 6 | 6
(Netherlands) K Boogert (Netherlands) N Krijger-Jagerman | 4 | 2
(Italy) S Farina (Italy) L Ferrando | 3 | 6 | 8
(Australia) J Hodder (Australia) A Woolcock | 6 | 4 | 6
(Australia) N Provis (France) N Tauziat | 0 | 6 | 6
(Canada) M Drake (United States) A Keller | 6 | 3 | 3
(United States) A Frazier (Japan) R Hiraki | 1 | 3
15 | (United States) L Davenport (United States) L Raymond | 6 | 6
11 | (South Africa) E Reinach (Czech Republic) A Strnadová | 7 | 6
(Germany) W Probst (Germany) C Singer | 5 | 3
(Romania) R Dragomir (Romania) I Spîrlea | 6 | 7
(United States) C Benjamin (United States) K Po | 4 | 6^{0}
(France) J Halard (Germany) A Huber | 6^{4} | 3
(Japan) Y Kamio (Japan) K Nagatsuka | 7 | 6
(Greece) C Papadaki (Switzerland) E Zardo | 2 | 1
2 | (Czech Republic) J Novotná (Spain) A Sánchez Vicario | 6 | 6

Second round
6 | (United States) MJ Fernández (United States) Z Garrison-Jackson | 6 | 6^{2} | 6
(Italy) S Farina (Italy) L Ferrando | 3 | 7 | 4
(Australia) N Provis (France) N Tauziat | 2 | 1
15 | (United States) L Davenport (United States) L Raymond | 6 | 6
11 | (South Africa) E Reinach (Czech Republic) A Strnadová | 6 | 6
(Romania) R Dragomir (Romania) I Spîrlea | 1 | 0
(Japan) Y Kamio (Japan) K Nagatsuka | 2 | 3
2 | (Czech Republic) J Novotná (Spain) A Sánchez Vicario | 6 | 6

Third round
6 | (United States) MJ Fernández (United States) Z Garrison-Jackson | 6 | 6
15 | (United States) L Davenport (United States) L Raymond | 2 | 3
11 | (South Africa) E Reinach (Czech Republic) A Strnadová | 0 | 7 | 2
2 | (Czech Republic) J Novotná (Spain) A Sánchez Vicario | 6 | 5 | 6

Quarterfinals
6 | (United States) MJ Fernández (United States) Z Garrison-Jackson | 4 | 4
2 | (Czech Republic) J Novotná (Spain) A Sánchez Vicario | 6 | 6
