= Siobhán Nicholson =

Irish tennis player (born 1966)

- Country (sports): Ireland
- Born: 11 June 1966 (age 58); Wimbledon, England
- Height: 1.70 m (5 ft 7 in)
- Plays: Right-handed
- Prize money: $21,494

Singles
- Career record: 44–38
- Career titles: 3 ITF
- Highest ranking: No. 259 (16 November 1992)

Grand Slam singles results
- Wimbledon: Q1 (1983, 1992)

Doubles
- Career record: 50–42
- Career titles: 4 ITF
- Highest ranking: No. 309 (15 July 1991)

Grand Slam doubles results
- Wimbledon: Q1 (1992, 1993)

Siobhán Nicholson (born 11 June 1966) is an Irish former professional tennis player.

== Biography ==
Nicholson, a London-born player of Irish parentage, represented the Ireland Federation Cup team from 1983 to 1993. She featured in a total of 28 ties for Ireland, winning 10 singles and 12 doubles rubbers.

While competing on the professional tour, Nicholson reached a career best singles ranking of 259 in the world, which was at the time the highest ever ranking attained by an Irish woman player.

Nicholson played college tennis in the United States for the University of Florida, where she earned All-American honours for singles in both 1988 and 1989.

== ITF finals ==
Legend
$25,000 tournaments
$10,000 tournaments

=== Singles: 5 (3–2) ===
Result	No.	Date	Tournament	Surface	Opponent	Score
Win	1.	12 June 1988	Alvor, Portugal	Clay	(United States) Nicole Polasek	6–3, 6–2
Win	2.	19 June 1988	Madeira, Portugal	Hard	(Brazil) Themis Zambrzycki	1–6, 6–4, 8–6
Win	3.	5 May 1991	Basingstoke, United Kingdom	Hard	(United Kingdom) Caroline Hunt	6–2, 6–1
Loss	1.	24 November 1991	ITF Okada, Nigeria	Hard	(United States) Aurora Gima	1–6, 3–6
Loss	2.	5 April 1992	Windhoek, Namibia	Hard	(United Kingdom) Sarah Bentley	2–6, 3–6

=== Doubles: 6 (4–2) ===
Result	No.	Date	Tournament	Surface	Partner	Opponents	Score
Win	1.	12 June 1988	Alvor, Portugal	Clay	(United States) Nicole Polasek	(Australia) Leisa Dunn (Netherlands) Colette Sely	6–2, 6–3
Loss	1.	19 August 1990	Chatham, United States	Hard	(United States) Kirsten Dreyer	(United States) Kathy Foxworth (United States) Shannan McCarthy	2–6, 6–7^{(6)}
Win	2.	4 November 1990	Meknes, Morocco	Clay	(Republic of Ireland) Gina Niland	(France) Barbara Collet (France) Julie Foillard	7–5, 6–3
Win	3.	23 June 1991	Aveiro, Portugal	Hard	(United States) Kristine Jonkosky	(Greece) Christina Zachariadou (Portugal) Sofia Prazeres	6–0, 2–6, 6–2
Win	4.	30 June 1991	Covilhã, Portugal	Clay	(United States) Kristine Jonkosky	(France) Olivia De Camaret (Canada) Mélanie Bernard	6–1, 6–3
Loss	2.	11 October 1992	Dublin, Ireland	Hard	(Republic of Ireland) Gina Niland	(United Kingdom) Lucie Ahl (United Kingdom) Julie Salmon	5–7, 5–7
