= Lisa Keller =

Australian tennis player

- Country (sports): Australia
- Born: 15 July 1969 (age 55)

Singles
- Career record: 12–19
- Highest ranking: No. 468 (18 February 1991)

Grand Slam singles results
- Australian Open: Q1 (1991)

Doubles
- Career record: 29–29
- Career titles: 1 ITF
- Highest ranking: No. 280 (4 March 1991)

Grand Slam doubles results
- Australian Open: 1R (1991)

Lisa Keller (born 15 July 1969) is an Australian former professional tennis player.

While competing on the professional tour she reached a career high singles ranking of 468. In doubles she peaked at 280 in the world and won an ITF doubles title at Setúbal, Portugal in 1989.

Keller featured in the women's doubles main draw at the 1991 Australian Open, as a wildcard pairing with Robyn Mawdsley. They were beaten in the first round by Cathy Caverzasio and Sandra Wasserman.

== ITF finals ==
=== Doubles: 4 (1–3) ===
| Outcome | No. | Date | Tournament | Surface | Partner | Opponents | Score |
|---|---|---|---|---|---|---|---|
| Runner-up | 1. | 7 August 1988 | Roanoke, United States | Hard | (Australia) Danielle Jones | (Australia) Robyn Lamb (United States) Vincenza Procacci | 4–6, 7–5, 3–6 |
| Runner-up | 2. | 6 August 1989 | Rheda-Wiedenbrück, West Germany | Clay | (Australia) Danielle Jones | (Czechoslovakia) Nora Bajčíková (Czechoslovakia) Petra Holubová | 1–6, 2–6 |
| Winner | 1. | 17 September 1989 | Setúbal, Portugal | Hard | (Australia) Danielle Jones | (Netherlands) Colette Sely (Netherlands) Esmir Hoogendoorn | 6–1, 6–3 |
| Runner-up | 3. | 29 April 1990 | Sutton, United Kingdom | Clay | (Australia) Robyn Mawdsley | (Czechoslovakia) Helena Vildová (Czechoslovakia) Radka Bobková | 6–7^{(8)}, 3–6 |
