= Virginia Humphreys-Davies =

British tennis player

- Country (sports): United Kingdom
- Born: 6 January 1972 (age 54) Cambridge, England
- Height: 5’4"
- Plays: Right-handed
- Prize money: $34,290

Singles
- Highest ranking: No. 357 (6 April 1992)

Grand Slam singles results
- Wimbledon: 1R (1991, 1992)

Doubles
- Career titles: 4 ITF
- Highest ranking: No. 239 (11 May 1992)

Grand Slam doubles results
- Wimbledon: Q2 (1991)

Virginia "Ginny" Humphreys-Davies (born 6 January 1972) is a British former professional tennis player.

A right-handed player, Humphreys-Davies twice featured in the main draw of the Wimbledon Championships. She reached her career high singles ranking of 357 in the world in 1992. As a doubles player she had a best ranking of 239 and won four ITF titles.

== ITF finals ==
Legend
$25,000 tournaments
$10,000 tournaments

=== Singles (0–2) ===
Result	No.	Date	Tournament	Surface	Opponent	Score
Loss	1.	16 July 1989	Dublin, Ireland	Grass	(United Kingdom) Barbara Griffiths	5–7, 6–7^{(4)}
Loss	2.	15 July 1991	Frinton-on-Sea, United Kingdom	Grass	(France) Emmanuelle Derly	3–6, 3–6

=== Doubles (4–3) ===
Result	No.	Date	Tournament	Surface	Partner	Opponents	Score
Win	1.	19 February 1990	Manchester, UK	Carpet (i)	(South Africa) Michelle Anderson	(Netherlands) Gaby Coorengel (Netherlands) Amy van Buuren	6–2, 6–2
Loss	1.	13 January 1991	Midland, US	Hard	(Czechoslovakia) Lucie Ludvigová	(United States) Jessica Emmons (United States) Betsy Somerville	4–6, 6–4, 2–6
Loss	2.	29 April 1991	Basingstoke, UK	Hard	(United Kingdom) Valda Lake	(United Kingdom) Caroline Billingham (Republic of Ireland) Lesley O'Halloran	5–7, 6–3, 4–6
Win	2.	21 July 1991	Frinton-on-Sea, UK	Grass	(United Kingdom) Caroline Billingham	(United Kingdom) Alison Smith (United Kingdom) Katie Rickett	6–3, 6–1
Win	3.	24 November 1991	Okada, Nigeria	Hard	(United Kingdom) Caroline Billingham	(United Kingdom) Amanda Evans (United States) Aurora Gima	1–6, 6–4, 6–4
Win	4.	1 March 1992	Jaffa, Israel	Hard	(United Kingdom) Jane Wood	(Commonwealth of Independent States) Karina Kuregian (Commonwealth of Independent States) Aida Khalatian	6–4, 6–3
Loss	3.	29 November 1992	Ramat HaSharon, Israel	Hard	(United Kingdom) Jane Wood	(Commonwealth of Independent States) Karina Kuregian (Commonwealth of Independent States) Aida Khalatian	4–6, 6–3, 4–6
