= Karen Cross =

British tennis player

- Country (sports): (United Kingdom) Great Britain
- Born: 19 February 1974 (age 51); Exeter, Devon
- Turned pro: 1993
- Retired: 2001
- Prize money: US$196,033

Singles
- Career record: 156–184
- Career titles: 0 WTA, 3 ITF
- Highest ranking: No. 134 (22 June 1998)

Grand Slam singles results
- Australian Open: Q1 (1999)
- French Open: Q3 (1998)
- Wimbledon: 3R (1997)
- US Open: Q1 (1997, 1998, 1999)

Doubles
- Career record: 76–102
- Career titles: 0 WTA, 3 ITF
- Highest ranking: No. 196 (5 October 1998)

Grand Slam doubles results
- Wimbledon: 1R (1998, 1999)

Grand Slam mixed doubles results
- Wimbledon: 1R (1999)

Karen Cross (born 19 February 1974) is a left-handed British former tennis player who competed at eight Wimbledon Championships during the 1990s and early 2000s, as well as for the Great Britain Fed Cup team in both 1994 and 1998. (Note: Karen Cross at the Billie Jean King Cup (archived)) During the course of her career Cross won six titles on the ITF circuit (3 in singles and 3 in doubles) and she achieved her highest Women's Tennis Association singles ranking of world number 134 on 22 June 1998. She is currently a part-time tennis coach at the Roehampton Club and since retirement from the professional circuit she has regularly competed on the ITF senior circuit, reaching a career-high ranking of world no.4 in the women's over-35's age group.

At the Grand Slams, Cross's best result came at Wimbledon in 1997 when she won three matches to qualify before defeating Linda Wild and María Sánchez Lorenzo to reach the third round where she was defeated by the reigning French Open champion, Iva Majoli, in three close sets.

Cross gained victories over a number of players who would go on to achieve (or had already experienced) great success on the WTA tour, the most notable being future two-time Australian Open champion and world number 2 Li Na (in December 1999) and future multiple Grand Slam doubles champion and doubles world number 1, Roberta Vinci (in July 2000). Other notable defeated opponents included future two-time WTA titlist and world number 19 Sybille Bammer, future world number 32 Jelena Kostanić, future one-time WTA titlist and world number 48 Milagros Sequera and former one-time WTA titlist and world number 56, Monique Javer.

== ITF circuit finals ==
=== Singles (3–0) ===
Finals by category $100,000 tournaments (0/0) $75,000 tournaments (0/0) $50,000 tournaments (0/0) $25,000 tournaments (0/0) $10,000 tournaments (3/0)	Finals by surface Hard (0/0) Clay (2/0) Grass (1/0) Carpet (0/0)

Result	Date	Category	Tournament	Surface	Opponent	Score
Win	26 July 1993	ITF $10,000	Istanbul, Turkey	Clay	(Turkey) Gülberk Gültekin	4–6, 7–5, 7–6^{(7–4)}
Win	8 May 1995	ITF $10,000	Lee-on-Solent, Great Britain	Clay	(United Kingdom) Jo Durie	6–4, 6–4
Win	8 July 1997	ITF $10,000	Felixstowe, Great Britain	Grass	(South Africa) Surina De Beer	6–1, 7–5

=== Doubles (3–3) ===
Finals by category $100,000 tournaments (0/0) $75,000 tournaments (0/0) $50,000 tournaments (0/0) $25,000 tournaments (1/0) $10,000 tournaments (2/3)	Finals by surface Hard (1/1) Clay (1/1) Grass (1/1) Carpet (0/0)

Result	Date	Category	Tournament	Surface	Partnering	Opponents	Score
Loss	24 April 1995	ITF $10,000	Edinburgh, United Kingdom	Clay	(United Kingdom) Lizzie Jelfs	(Australia) Robyn Mawdsley (United Kingdom) Lorna Woodroffe	3–6, 1–6
Win	8 May 1995	ITF $10,000	Edinburgh, United Kingdom	Clay	(United Kingdom) Lizzie Jelfs	(United Kingdom) Kaye Hand (United Kingdom) Claire Taylor	3–6, 6–3, 6–0
Win	7 August 1995	ITF $10,000	Southsea, United Kingdom	Grass	(United Kingdom) Jane Wood	(Israel) Nataly Cahana (Israel) Oshri Shashua	6–4, 7–5
Loss	14 July 1997	ITF $10,000	Frinton, United Kingdom	Grass	(Russia) Natalia Egorova	(United Kingdom) Joanne Ward (United Kingdom) Lorna Woodroffe	4–6, 6–2, 0–6
Loss	29 September 1997	ITF $10,000	Nottingham, United Kingdom	Hard (i)	(United Kingdom) Lizzie Jelfs	(United Kingdom) Lucie Ahl (United Kingdom) Joanne Ward	6–7^{(8–6)}, 2–6
Win	12 April 1999	ITF $25,000	Cagnes-sur-Mer, France	Hard	(Australia) Amanda Grahame	(Australia) Louise Pleming (France) Catherine Tanvier	6–4, 3–6, 7–6^{(8–6)}

== Performance timelines ==
Key
W	F	SF	QF	#R	RR	Q#	DNQ	A	NH

(W) winner; (F) finalist; (SF) semifinalist; (QF) quarterfinalist; (#R) rounds 4, 3, 2, 1; (RR) round-robin stage; (Q#) qualification round; (DNQ) did not qualify; (A) absent; (NH) not held; (SR) strike rate (events won / competed); (W–L) win–loss record.

=== Singles ===
Tournament	1993	1994	1995	1996	1997	1998	1999	2000	2001	W–L	SR
Grand Slam tournaments
Australian Open	Absent						Q1	Absent		0–0	0 / 0
French Open	Absent					Q3	Q1	Q1	A	0–0	0 / 0
Wimbledon	1R	1R	1R	Q1	3R	2R	2R	1R	2R	5–8	0 / 8
US Open	Absent				Q1	Q1	Q1	Absent		0–0	0 / 0
Win–loss	0–1	0–1	0–1	0–0	2–1	1–1	1–1	0–1	1–1	5–8	0 / 8
Year-end ranking	325	295	241	305	146	162	198	311	UNR		

=== Doubles ===
Tournament	1991	1992	1993	1994	1995	1996	1997	1998	1999	2000	W–L	SR
Grand Slam tournaments
Australian Open	Absent										0–0	0 / 0
French Open	Absent										0–0	0 / 0
Wimbledon	Q2	A	Q2	Absent		Q1	A	1R	1R	Q1	0–2	0 / 2
US Open	Absent										0–0	0 / 0
Win–loss	0–0	0–0	0–0	0–0	0–0	0–0	0–0	0–1	0–1	0–0	0–2	0 / 2

=== Mixed doubles ===
Tournament	1999	W–L	SR
Grand Slam tournaments
Australian Open	A	0–0	0 / 0
French Open	A	0–0	0 / 0
Wimbledon	1R	0–1	0 / 1
US Open	A	0–0	0 / 0
Win–loss	0–1	0–1	0 / 1

=== Fed Cup ===
1994 Federation Cup Europe/Africa Zone
Date	Venue	Surface	Round	Opponents	Final match score	Match	Opponent	Rubber score
20 Apr 1994	Bad Waltersdorf	Clay	RR	Russia	2–1	Doubles(with Julie Pullin)	Lutrova/Panova	5–7, 5–7 (L)
1998 Federation Cup Europe/Africa Zone
14–16 Apr 1998	Murcia	Clay	RR	Portugal	1–2	Singles	Sofia Prazeres	6–2, 2–6, 4–6 (L)
14–16 Apr 1998	Murcia	Clay	RR	Poland	1–2	Singles	Magdalena Grzybowska	1–6, 2–6 (L)
14–16 Apr 1998	Murcia	Clay	RR	Madagascar	3–0	Singles	Faratiana Rasoarilalao	6–1, 6–3 (W)
