= Tessa Price =

South African tennis player

- Country (sports): South Africa
- Born: 25 March 1967 (age 59) Cape Town, South Africa
- Retired: 1997
- Prize money: $160,517

Singles
- Career record: 133–86
- Career titles: 9 ITF
- Highest ranking: No. 101 (24 October 1994)

Grand Slam singles results
- Australian Open: 2R (1993)
- Wimbledon: 2R (1994)
- US Open: 1R (1994)

Doubles
- Career record: 94–69
- Career titles: 8 ITF
- Highest ranking: No. 129 (5 December 1994)

Grand Slam doubles results
- Australian Open: 2R (1994)
- French Open: 1R (1994)
- Wimbledon: 2R (1996)
- US Open: 2R (1994)

Tessa Price (born 25 March 1967) is a retired tennis player from South Africa. She participated in four Grand Slam tournaments during her career, reaching the second round at the Australian Open in 1993, and at Wimbledon in 1994.

== ITF Circuit finals ==
Legend
$50,000 tournaments
$25,000 tournaments
$10,000 tournaments

=== Singles (9–3) ===
Result	No.	Date	Location	Surface	Opponent	Score
Win	1.	20 June 1988	Mobile, United States	Hard	(United States) Jessica Emmons	7–5, 7–5
Win	2.	29 July 1991	Haifa, Israel	Hard	(Soviet Union) Tessa Shapovalova	6–2, 6–0
Win	3.	12 August 1991	Ashkelon, Israel	Hard	(Israel) Ilana Berger	7–6^{(9–7)}, 6–7^{(2–7)}, 6–3
Loss	4.	19 August 1991	Ashkelon, Israel	Hard	(Israel) Ilana Berger	3–6, 7–6^{(7–5)}, 4–6
Win	5.	25 November 1991	Ramat HaSharon, Israel	Hard	(Israel) Anna Smashnova	6–4, 6–3
Loss	6.	26 October 1992	Saga, Japan	Grass	(New Zealand) Julie Richardson	2–6, 6–7^{(8–10)}
Loss	7.	2 November 1992	Machida, Japan	Grass	(Japan) Yone Kamio	6–4, 6–7, 2–6
Win	8.	16 November 1992	Port Pirie, Australia	Hard	(Australia) Joanne Limmer	3–6, 6–3, 6–1
Win	9.	30 November 1992	Mildura, Australia	Hard	(Paraguay) Rossana de los Ríos	6–3, 6–3
Win	10.	25 October 1993	Jakarta, Indonesia	Hard	(Indonesia) Romana Tedjakusuma	7–6^{(7–3)}, 6–2
Win	11.	8 November 1993	Mount Gambier, Australia	Hard	(Australia) Nicole Pratt	4–6, 6–2, 6–0
Win	12.	29 November 1993	Mildura, Australia	Hard	(Australia) Nicole Pratt	7–5, 3–6, 7–5

=== Doubles (8–3) ===
Result	No.	Date	Location	Surface	Partner	Opponents	Score
Win	1.	29 July 1991	Haifa, Israel	Hard	(United States) Kirsten Dreyer	(South Africa) Janine Humphreys (Namibia) Elizma Nortje	6–1, 6–0
Loss	2.	12 August 1991	Ashkelon, Israel	Hard	(United States) Kirsten Dreyer	(Israel) Ilana Berger (South Africa) Robyn Field	w/o
Win	3.	11 November 1991	Swindon, United Kingdom	Carpet	(Israel) Ilana Berger	(Belgium) Els Callens (Switzerland) Michèle Strebel	6–2, 7–5
Win	4.	13 July 1992	Evansville, United States	Hard	(Australia) Danielle Jones	(Canada) Mélanie Bernard (Canada) Caroline Delisle	6–2, 4–6, 6–4
Win	5.	20 July 1992	Roanoke, United States	Hard	(Australia) Danielle Jones	(Canada) Mélanie Bernard (South Africa) Cindy Summers	6–2, 6–2
Loss	6.	10 August 1992	York, United States	Hard	(Australia) Danielle Jones	(United States) Nicole Arendt (United States) Shannan McCarthy	3–6, 3–6
Win	7.	16 November 1992	Port Pirie, Australia	Hard	(Australia) Danielle Jones	(Australia) Joanne Limmer (Australia) Robyn Mawdsley	6–2, 5–7, 6–3
Win	8.	17 July 1995	Wilmington, United States	Hard	(United Kingdom) Clare Wood	(Australia) Catherine Barclay (United States) Audra Keller	3–6, 6–1, 6–1
Loss	9.	4 September 1995	Tianjin, China	Hard	(Germany) Kirstin Freye	(China) Chen Li (China) Li Fang	2–6, 3–6
Win	10.	30 October 1995	Saga, Japan	Grass	(Australia) Danielle Jones	(Australia) Robyn Mawdsley (Australia) Kirrily Sharpe	6–4, 6–2
Win	11.	15 April 1996	Elvas, Portugal	Hard	(United Kingdom) Claire Taylor	(Finland) Hanna-Katri Aalto (Finland) Kirsi Lampinen	6–2, 6–3
