= Amanda Wainwright =

British tennis player

- Country (sports): United Kingdom
- Born: 24 March 1976 (age 49); Essex, England
- Plays: Right-handed
- Prize money: $82,553

Singles
- Highest ranking: No. 218 (13 June 1994)

Grand Slam singles results
- Wimbledon: 2R (1993)

Doubles
- Highest ranking: No. 95 (22 September 1997)

Grand Slam doubles results
- Wimbledon: 2R (1997)
- US Open: 2R (1997)

Amanda "Mandy" Wainwright (born 24 March 1976) is a British former professional tennis player.

== Biography ==
Wainwright grew up in the county of Essex, attending Bancroft's School in Woodford Green.

A right-handed player, Wainwright made her Wimbledon debut in 1993 and upset Caroline Kuhlman, the world number 78, in the first round. She didn't progress past the opening round in her two other singles main draw appearances at Wimbledon and was more successful on tour as a doubles player, ranked as high as 95 in the world.

Wainwright has now returned to Bancroft's School in Woodford Green as a history teacher and Head of Tennis.

== ITF circuit finals ==
Legend
$50,000 tournaments
$25,000 tournaments
$10,000 tournaments

=== Singles (1–2) ===
Result	No.	Date	Location	Surface	Opponent	Score
Win	1.	29 August 1993	Gryfino, Poland	Clay	(Poland) Monika Starosta	4–6, 6–4, 6–1
Loss	2.	5 September 1993	Burgas, Bulgaria	Hard	(Bulgaria) Svetlana Krivencheva	3–6, 6–1, 6–7^{(3)}
Loss	3.	4 October 1997	Nottingham, United Kingdom	Hard (i)	(Russia) Natalia Egorova	2–6, 7–6, 1–6

=== Doubles (6–11) ===
Result	No.	Date	Location	Surface	Partner	Opponents	Score
Loss	1.	14 November 1994	Eastbourne, United Kingdom	Carpet	(United Kingdom) Shirli-Ann Siddall	(Russia) Natalia Egorova (Russia) Svetlana Parkhomenko	6–7^{(8)}, 6–7^{(6)}
Loss	2.	6 February 1995	Sheffield, United Kingdom	Hard	(United Kingdom) Lorna Woodroffe	(Russia) Natalia Egorova (Russia) Svetlana Parkhomenko	4–6, 2–6
Win	1.	8 May 1995	Le Touquet, France	Clay	(France) Amélie Mauresmo	(Greece) Julia Apostoli (France) Sylvie Sabas	6–4, 6–2
Loss	3.	13 November 1995	Edinburgh, United Kingdom	Carpet (i)	(United Kingdom) Shirli-Ann Siddall	(Russia) Julia Lutrova (United Kingdom) Jane Wood	6–7^{(7)}, 4–6
Loss	4.	31 March 1996	Caen, France	Clay	(United Kingdom) Claire Taylor	(Sweden) Annica Lindstedt (Sweden) Anna-Karin Svensson	4–6, 6–7^{(4)}
Loss	5.	4 May 1996	Hatfield, United Kingdom	Clay	(United Kingdom) Shirli-Ann Siddall	(Australia) Robyn Mawdsley (United Kingdom) Jane Wood	6–4, 6–7^{(4)}, 5–7
Win	2.	12 May 1996	Lee-on-Solent, United Kingdom	Clay	(United Kingdom) Shirli-Ann Siddall	(United Kingdom) Lucie Ahl (United Kingdom) Joanne Ward	7–5, 6–1
Win	3.	23 September 1996	Santa Clara, United States	Hard	(United States) Meilen Tu	(United States) Janet Lee (United States) Laxmi Poruri	7–5, 6–2
Loss	6.	20 October 1996	Cardiff, United Kingdom	Hard (i)	(United Kingdom) Shirli-Ann Siddall	(Sweden) Maria Strandlund (France) Anne-Gaëlle Sidot	3–6, 3–6
Win	4.	8 February 1997	Sunderland, United Kingdom	Hard (i)	(United Kingdom) Shirli-Ann Siddall	(United Kingdom) Megan Miller (United Kingdom) Rachel Viollet	7–6^{(2)}, 6–4
Loss	7.	16 February 1997	Birmingham, United Kingdom	Hard (i)	(United Kingdom) Shirli-Ann Siddall	(United Kingdom) Julie Pullin (United Kingdom) Lorna Woodroffe	2–6, 4–6
Loss	8.	7 April 1997	Hvar, Croatia	Clay	(United Kingdom) Julie Pullin	(Slovakia) Patrícia Marková (Slovakia) Zuzana Váleková	6–7^{(3)}, 4–6
Win	5.	27 April 1997	Bournemouth, United Kingdom	Clay	(United Kingdom) Shirli-Ann Siddall	(United Kingdom) Lorna Woodroffe (United Kingdom) Julie Pullin	6–3, 7–5
Win	6.	14 July 1997	Clearwater, United States	Hard (i)	(United Kingdom) Julie Pullin	(Canada) Maureen Drake (United States) Lindsay Lee-Waters	6–4, 6–4
Loss	9.	27 July 1997	Peachtree City, United States	Hard	(United Kingdom) Julie Pullin	(Canada) Sonya Jeyaseelan (Japan) Kaoru Shibata	4–6, 1–6
Loss	10.	11 July 1998	Felixstowe, United Kingdom	Grass	(United Kingdom) Lucie Ahl	(Australia) Lisa McShea (Australia) Trudi Musgrave	4–6, 6–7
Loss	11.	18 July 1998	Frinton, United Kingdom	Grass	(United Kingdom) Lucie Ahl	(United Kingdom) Lizzie Jelfs (South Africa) Mareze Joubert	2–6, 5–7
