= Amy van Buuren =

Dutch tennis player

- Country (sports): Netherlands
- Born: 20 May 1969 (age 55)
- Prize money: $43,099

Singles
- Career record: 82–94
- Career titles: 0
- Highest ranking: No. 372 (9 October 1989)

Doubles
- Career record: 73–69
- Career titles: 4 ITF
- Highest ranking: No. 114 (12 August 1991)

Grand Slam doubles results
- French Open: 2R (1991)
- Wimbledon: 2R (1991)
- US Open: 1R (1991)

Amy van Buuren (born 20 May 1969) is a Dutch former professional tennis player.

Debuting on the professional tour in the late 1980s, van Buuren was most successful as a doubles player, with a best ranking of 114 in the world. In 1991, she featured in the main draw of three Grand Slam tournaments, reaching the second rounds of the French Open and Wimbledon, both partnering Gaby Coorengel.

== ITF finals ==
$25,000 tournaments
$10,000 tournaments

=== Singles (0–2) ===
Result	No.	Date	Tournament	Surface	Opponent	Score
Loss	1.	25 August 1991	ITF Koksijde, Belgium	Clay	(Soviet Union) Olga Lugina	4–6, 7–5, 1–6
Loss	2.	11 May 1992	ITF Bournemouth, UK	Hard	(South Africa) Joannette Kruger	2–6, 2–6

=== Doubles (4–12) ===
Result	No.	Date	Tournament	Surface	Partner	Opponents	Score
Win	1.	4 October 1987	ITF Rabac, Yugoslavia	Clay	(Luxembourg) Karin Kschwendt	(Netherlands) Marielle Rooimans (Netherlands) Nicolette Rooimans	6–3, 6–4
Loss	1.	29 August 1988	ITF Nivelles, Belgium	Clay	(Hungary) Réka Szikszay	(Soviet Union) Elena Brioukhovets (Soviet Union) Viktoria Milvidskaia	6–1, 5–7, 1–6
Loss	2.	19 September 1988	ITF Marsa, Malta	Hard	(Hungary) Réka Szikszay	(Switzerland) Mareke Plocher (Netherlands) Titia Wilmink	5–7, 6–7
Loss	3.	20 March 1989	ITF Marsa, Malta	Hard	(United Kingdom) Belinda Borneo	(Netherlands) Pascale Druyts (Italy) Caterina Nozzoli	3–6, 6–3, 3–6
Loss	4.	8 May 1989	ITF Lee-on-Solent, England	Clay	(United Kingdom) Belinda Borneo	(United Kingdom) Jo Louis (United Kingdom) Alexandra Niepel	3–6, 2–6
Loss	5.	15 May 1989	Queen's Club, England	Clay	(United Kingdom) Belinda Borneo	(Japan) Kimiko Date (Japan) Shiho Okada	6–7^{(2)}, 3–6
Loss	6.	12 February 1990	ITF Hørsholm, Denmark	Carpet (i)	(Netherlands) Gaby Coorengel	(Denmark) Merete Balling-Stockmann (Denmark) Pernilla Sorensen	4–6, 6–4, 5–7
Loss	7.	19 February 1990	ITF Manchester, England	Carpet (i)	(Netherlands) Gaby Coorengel	(South Africa) Michelle Anderson (United Kingdom) Virginia Humphreys-Davies	2–6, 2–6
Win	2.	21 May 1990	ITF Katowice, Poland	Clay	(Netherlands) Gaby Coorengel	(Czechoslovakia) Karin Baleková (Czechoslovakia) Jitka Dubcová	7–5, 3–6, 6–3
Loss	8.	3 December 1990	ITF Le Havre, France	Clay (i)	(Netherlands) Gaby Coorengel	(France) Agnès Zugasti (France) Julie Halard-Decugis	3–6, 0–6
Loss	9.	2 December 1991	ITF Le Havre, France	Clay (i)	(Netherlands) Gaby Coorengel	(France) Nathalie Herreman (Soviet Union) Eugenia Maniokova	3–6, 4–6
Loss	10.	17 February 1992	ITF Vall d'Hebron, Spain	Clay	(Netherlands) Gaby Coorengel	(Czechoslovakia) Petra Holubová (Czechoslovakia) Markéta Štusková	7–5, 4–6, 2–6
Loss	11.	19 October 1992	ITF Lyss, Switzerland	Hard	(Netherlands) Gaby Coorengel	(Israel) Nelly Barkan (Bulgaria) Svetlana Krivencheva	6–7^{(4)}, 6–3, 4–6
Win	3.	22 February 1993	ITF Valencia, Spain	Clay	(Netherlands) Gaby Coorengel	(Spain) Eva Bes (Spain) Virginia Ruano Pascual	6–4, 6–0
Win	4.	1 March 1993	ITF Cascais, Portugal	Clay	(Netherlands) Lara Bitter	(Czech Republic) Pavlína Rajzlová (Czech Republic) Helena Vildová	6–1, 2–6, 6–3
Loss	12.	26 July 1993	ITF Rheda, Germany	Clay	(Netherlands) Gaby Coorengel	(Czech Republic) Petra Holubová (Germany) Katja Oeljeklaus	5–7, 0–6
