= Gaby Coorengel =

Dutch tennis player

- Country (sports): Netherlands
- Born: 27 November 1969 (age 55)
- Prize money: $51,505

Singles
- Career record: 91–64
- Career titles: 4 ITF
- Highest ranking: No. 229 (25 November 1991)

Doubles
- Career record: 70–46
- Career titles: 6 ITF
- Highest ranking: No. 117 (28 October 1991)

Grand Slam doubles results
- French Open: 2R (1991)
- Wimbledon: 2R (1991)
- US Open: 1R (1991)

Gaby Coorengel (born 27 November 1969) is a Dutch former professional tennis player.

Coorengel reached a career-high singles ranking of 229 and won four ITF titles. As a doubles player, she had her best years in the early 1990s, in partnership with Amy van Buuren, reaching a best ranking of 117 in the world. The pair made the second round of both the French Open and Wimbledon in 1991.

== ITF finals ==
$25,000 tournaments
$10,000 tournaments

=== Singles: 5 (4–1) ===
Result	No.	Date	Tournament	Surface	Opponent	Score
Loss	1.	5 October 1992	Dublin, Ireland	Clay	(France) Laurence Andretto	6–1, 3–6, 3–6
Win	1.	1 February 1993	Newcastle, England	Carpet (i)	(United Kingdom) Lizzie Jelfs	6–1, 6–2
Win	2.	8 February 1993	Sunderland, England	Carpet (i)	(Russia) Svetlana Parkhomenko	3–6, 7–6^{(3)}, 6–3
Win	3.	15 November 1993	Swansea, Wales	Hard (i)	(United Kingdom) Shirli-Ann Siddall	6–3, 6–7^{(3)}, 7–6^{(5)}
Win	4.	7 February 1994	Sunderland, England	Carpet (i)	(Austria) Marion Maruska	6–2, 7–5

=== Doubles: 14 (6–8) ===
Result	No.	Date	Tournament	Surface	Partner	Opponents	Score
Win	1.	20 July 1987	Amersfoort, Netherlands	Clay	(Netherlands) Caroline Vis	(Netherlands) Yvonne der Kinderen (Netherlands) Inge Dolman	6–3, 3–6, 6–1
Win	2.	18 July 1988	Amersfoort, Netherlands	Clay	(Netherlands) Caroline Vis	(Netherlands) Pascale Druyts (Netherlands) Yvonne Schreurs	6–3, 6–2
Loss	1.	12 February 1990	Hørsholm, Denmark	Carpet (i)	(Netherlands) Amy van Buuren	(Denmark) Merete Balling-Stockmann (Denmark) Pernilla Sorensen	4–6, 6–4, 5–7
Loss	2.	19 February 1990	Manchester, England	Carpet (i)	(Netherlands) Amy van Buuren	(South Africa) Michelle Anderson (United Kingdom) Virginia Humphreys-Davies	2–6, 2–6
Win	3.	21 May 1990	Katowice, Poland	Clay	(Netherlands) Amy van Buuren	(Czechoslovakia) Karin Baleková (Czechoslovakia) Jitka Dubcová	7–5, 3–6, 6–3
Loss	3.	3 December 1990	Le Havre, France	Clay (i)	(Netherlands) Amy van Buuren	(France) Agnès Zugasti (France) Julie Halard-Decugis	3–6, 0–6
Loss	4.	2 December 1991	Le Havre, France	Clay (i)	(Netherlands) Amy van Buuren	(France) Nathalie Herreman (Russia) Eugenia Maniokova	3–6, 4–6
Loss	5.	17 February 1992	Hebron, Spain	Clay	(Netherlands) Amy van Buuren	(Czechoslovakia) Petra Holubová (Czechoslovakia) Markéta Štusková	7–5, 4–6, 2–6
Loss	6.	20 April 1992	Ramat HaSharon, Israel	Hard	(Israel) Yael Segal	(Netherlands) Carin Bakkum (Netherlands) Ingelise Driehuis	2–6, 1–6
Loss	7.	19 October 1992	Lyss, Switzerland	Hard (i)	(Netherlands) Amy van Buuren	(Israel) Nelly Barkan (Bulgaria) Svetlana Krivencheva	6–7^{(4)}, 6–3, 4–6
Win	4.	22 February 1993	Valencia, Spain	Clay	(Netherlands) Amy van Buuren	(Spain) Eva Bes (Spain) Virginia Ruano Pascual	6–4, 6–0
Loss	8.	26 July 1993	Rheda-Wiedenbrück, Germany	Clay	(Netherlands) Amy van Buuren	(Czech Republic) Petra Holubová (Germany) Katja Oeljeklaus	5–7, 0–6
Win	5.	7 February 1994	Sunderland, England	Hard (i)	(United Kingdom) Alison Smith	(Netherlands) Caroline Stassen (Netherlands) Nathalie Thijssen	3–6, 6–1, 6–2
Win	6.	14 March 1994	Reims, France	Clay (i)	(United Kingdom) Alison Smith	(Czech Republic) Ivana Jankovská (Czech Republic) Eva Melicharová	4–6, 7–6, 7–5
