= Shirli-Ann Siddall =

British tennis player

- Full name: Shirli-Ann Valentine (nee Siddall)
- Country (sports): United Kingdom
- Born: 20 June 1974 (age 50); Liverpool, England
- Height: 1.68 m (5 ft 6 in)
- Prize money: $138,509

Singles
- Career record: 139–132
- Career titles: 7 ITF
- Highest ranking: No. 181 (8 December 1997)

Grand Slam singles results
- Wimbledon: 2R (1992, 1994)

Doubles
- Career record: 110–82
- Career titles: 14 ITF
- Highest ranking: No. 108 (13 October 1997)

Grand Slam doubles results
- Wimbledon: 2R (1997)
- US Open: 1R (1997)

Grand Slam mixed doubles results
- Wimbledon: 3R (1996, 1997)

Team competitions
- Fed Cup: 0–2

Shirli-Ann Valentine (born 20 June 1974), formerly Shirli-Ann Siddall, is a British former professional tennis player.

== Biography ==
Siddall, who was born in Liverpool, had a promising junior career. In 1990 she won seven out of eight national titles in the under-16 and under-18 divisions.

Based in Dorset, Siddall played professionally in the 1990s. In 1995, she featured in Fed Cup ties for Great Britain against both Poland and the Czech Republic, in Murcia, Spain. She competed regularly in the main draw of the Wimbledon Championships and once at the US Open in 1997, partnering Barbara Schett in the women's doubles.

She made the second round of Wimbledon in both 1992 and 1994. Her most famous match came against Jennifer Capriati in the first round of the 1993 Wimbledon Championships. Playing as a wildcard, Siddall took the first set off the seventh seeded Capriati, but was unable to secure the upset, as the young American came back to win in three. She was most successful in the mixed doubles draw at Wimbledon, with two appearances in the round of 16, both times with Danny Sapsford. The only other occasion she partnered Sapsford at Wimbledon was in 1995 when she had to be carried off the court in a stretcher after fainting from heat exhaustion during their first round match, played in record temperatures.

Siddall retired from professional tour in 1998. She had been suffering from a persistent back injury.

In 2002, she married Nick Valentine at All Saints Church in Bournemouth. Their wedding took place on the same day as the Wimbledon ladies final.

She lives with her family in the town of Poole in Dorset.

== ITF Circuit finals ==
Legend
$50,000 tournaments
$25,000 tournaments
$10,000 tournaments

=== Singles: 11 (7–4) ===
Result	No.	Date	Location	Surface	Opponent	Score
Win	1.	22 April 1991	Bracknell, Great Britain	Hard	(United States) Diana Gardner	7–5, 6–4
Loss	2.	15 November 1993	Swansea, Great Britain	Hard (i)	(Netherlands) Gaby Coorengel	3–6, 7–6^{(7–3)}, 6–7^{(5–7)}
Loss	3.	3 April 1994	Gaborone, Botswana	Hard	(Spain) Magüi Serna	3–6, 4–6
Loss	4.	10 April 1994	Harare, Zimbabwe	Hard	(Spain) Magüi Serna	4–6, 2–6
Win	5.	11 July 1994	Frinton, Great Britain	Grass	(Canada) Vanessa Webb	6–4, 7–6^{(7–5)}
Loss	6.	18 July 1994	Ilkley, Great Britain	Grass	(Australia) Kirrily Sharpe	5–7, 1–6
Win	7.	27 April 1996	Edinburgh, Great Britain	Clay	(Czech Republic) Karin Baleková	6–4, 2–6, 6–0
Win	8.	14 July 1996	Felixstowe, Great Britain	Grass	(Hungary) Anita Kurimay	6–2, 6–4
Win	9.	16 February 1997	Birmingham, Great Britain	Hard (i)	(United Kingdom) Claire Taylor	6–4, 6–4
Win	10.	3 March 1997	Warrnambool, Australia	Grass	(United Kingdom) Lucie Ahl	6–3, 6–3
Win	11.	4 May 1997	Hatfield, Great Britain	Clay	(United Kingdom) Lucie Ahl	6–2, 6–0

=== Doubles: 23 (14–9) ===
Result	No.	Date	Location	Surface	Partner	Opponents	Score
Win	1.	20 September 1993	Sheffield, Great Britain	Hard	(United Kingdom) Caroline Hunt	(Russia) Natalia Egorova (Russia) Svetlana Parkhomenko	6–4, 7–5
Win	2.	27 September 1993	Bracknell, Great Britain	Hard	(United Kingdom) Caroline Hunt	(Netherlands) Caroline Stassen (United Kingdom) Alison Smith	6–2, 6–1
Win	3.	18 July 1994	Ilkley, Great Britain	Grass	(United Kingdom) Jo Durie	(Australia) Justine Hodder (Australia) Kirrily Sharpe	5–7, 6–4, 6–4
Loss	4.	14 November 1994	Eastbourne, Great Britain	Carpet (i)	(United Kingdom) Amanda Wainwright	(Russia) Natalia Egorova (Russia) Svetlana Parkhomenko	6–7^{(8–10)}, 6–7^{(6–8)}
Win	5.	8 May 1995	Szczecin, Poland	Clay	(Australia) Catherine Barclay	(Australia) Kristin Godridge (Australia) Kirrily Sharpe	5–7, 7–5, 7–6^{(7–4)}
Loss	6.	13 November 1995	Edinburgh, Great Britain	Carpet (i)	(United Kingdom) Amanda Wainwright	(Russia) Julia Lutrova (United Kingdom) Jane Wood	6–7^{(7–9)}, 4–6
Loss	7.	4 May 1996	Hatfield, Great Britain	Clay	(United Kingdom) Amanda Wainwright	(Australia) Robyn Mawdsley (United Kingdom) Jane Wood	6–4, 6–7^{(4–7)}, 5–7
Win	8.	12 May 1996	Lee-on-Solent, Great Britain	Clay	(United Kingdom) Amanda Wainwright	(United Kingdom) Lucie Ahl (United Kingdom) Joanne Ward	7–5, 6–1
Loss	9.	14 July 1996	Felixstowe, Great Britain	Clay	(United Kingdom) Lucie Ahl	(South Africa) Surina De Beer (United Kingdom) Katia Roubanova	2–6, 4–6
Win	10.	21 July 1996	Frinton, Great Britain	Grass	(United Kingdom) Lucie Ahl	(Australia) Amy Jensen (Hungary) Anita Kurimay	6–1, 6–4
Loss	11.	4 August 1996	Ilkley, Great Britain	Grass	(United Kingdom) Lucie Ahl	(South Africa) Surina De Beer (United Kingdom) Katia Roubanova	1–6, 7–6, 3–6
Win	12.	11 August 1996	Southsea, Great Britain	Grass	(United Kingdom) Lucie Ahl	(United Kingdom) Louise Latimer (United Kingdom) Lorna Woodroffe	6–2, 7–6
Loss	13.	20 October 1996	Cardiff, Great Britain	Hard (i)	(United Kingdom) Amanda Wainwright	(Sweden) Maria Strandlund (France) Anne-Gaëlle Sidot	3–6, 3–6
Win	14.	8 February 1997	Sunderland, Great Britain	Hard (i)	(United Kingdom) Amanda Wainwright	(United Kingdom) Megan Miller (United Kingdom) Rachel Viollet	7–6^{(7–2)}, 6–4
Loss	15.	16 February 1997	Birmingham, Great Britain	Hard (i)	(United Kingdom) Amanda Wainwright	(United Kingdom) Julie Pullin (United Kingdom) Lorna Woodroffe	2–6, 4–6
Win	16.	24 March 1997	Warrnambool, Australia	Grass	(South Africa) Nannie de Villiers	(Australia) Joanne Limmer (Australia) Lisa McShea	6–4, 4–6, 7–6
Win	17.	30 March 1997	Warrnambool, Australia	Grass	(South Africa) Nannie de Villiers	(United Kingdom) Joanne Ward (United Kingdom) Lorna Woodroffe	3–6, 6–2, 6–3
Loss	18.	4 April 1997	Corowa, Australia	Grass	(South Africa) Nannie de Villiers	(Australia) Trudi Musgrave (Australia) Jane Taylor	4–6, 7–6, 4–6
Win	19.	27 April 1997	Bournemouth, Great Britain	Clay	(United Kingdom) Amanda Wainwright	(United Kingdom) Lorna Woodroffe (United Kingdom) Julie Pullin	6–3, 7–5
Win	20.	4 May 1997	Hatfield, Great Britain	Clay	(United Kingdom) Joanne Ward	(United Kingdom) Lucie Ahl (South Africa) Jessica Steck	3–6, 6–4, 7–5
Win	21.	11 May 1997	Lee-on-Solent, Great Britain	Clay	(United Kingdom) Joanne Ward	(Russia) Natalia Egorova (United States) Rebecca Jensen	6–2, 7–5
Loss	22.	17 August 1997	The Bronx, United States	Hard	(United Kingdom) Lorna Woodroffe	(Australia) Lisa McShea (Australia) Rachel McQuillan	2–6, 1–6
Win	23.	1 March 1998	Bushey, Great Britain	Carpet (i)	(Australia) Trudi Musgrave	(France) Noëlle van Lottum (Germany) Kirstin Freye	7–6, 4–6, 6–2

== See also ==
- List of Great Britain Fed Cup team representatives
