= Jane Wood =

British tennis player

- Country (sports): United Kingdom
- Born: 20 March 1968 (age 58)
- Prize money: $34,146

Singles
- Career record: 50–66
- Highest ranking: No. 312 (8 July 1996)

Grand Slam singles results
- Wimbledon: 1R (1987)

Doubles
- Career record: 79–54
- Highest ranking: No. 167 (5 August 1996)

Grand Slam doubles results
- Wimbledon: 2R (1991)

Jane Wood (born 20 March 1968) is a British former professional tennis player.

Wood, a native of Enfield, competed on the professional tour in the 1980s and 1990s. She featured in the singles main draw of the 1987 Wimbledon Championships. Her career included a stint playing collegiate tennis in the United States for Oklahoma State University, where she achieved All-American honours for doubles in 1988.

== ITF finals ==
=== Singles: 2 (1–1) ===
Outcome	Date	Tournament	Surface	Opponent	Score
Runner–up	14 April 1986	Cumberland, United Kingdom	Hard	(Sweden) Catrin Jexell	4–6, 2–6
Winner	7 August 1995	Southsea, United Kingdom	Grass	(Russia) Julia Lutrova	6–1, 7–5

=== Doubles: 10 (7–3) ===
Outcome	No.	Date	Tournament	Surface	Partner	Opponents	Score
Runner–up	1.	11 March 1985	Stockholm, Sweden	Clay	(United Kingdom) Jo Louis	(Sweden) Maria Lindström (Sweden) Elisabeth Ekblom	5–7, 3–6
Winner	1.	19 April 1986	Cumberland, United Kingdom	Hard	(United Kingdom) Belinda Borneo	(South Africa) Monica Reinach (United Kingdom) Joy Tacon	6–4, 6–3
Winner	2.	19 August 1991	Jerusalem, Israel	Hard	(United Kingdom) Barbara Griffiths	(Israel) Ilana Berger (South Africa) Robyn Field	6–3, 6–7, 6–1
Winner	3.	1 March 1992	Jaffa, Israel	Hard	(United Kingdom) Virginia Humphreys-Davies	(Commonwealth of Independent States) Karina Kuregian (Commonwealth of Independent States) Aida Khalatian	6–4, 6–3
Runner–up	2.	29 November 1992	Ramat HaSharon, Israel	Hard	(United Kingdom) Virginia Humphreys-Davies	(Commonwealth of Independent States) Karina Kuregian (Commonwealth of Independent States) Aida Khalatian	4–6, 6–3, 4–6
Winner	4.	7 August 1995	Southsea, United Kingdom	Grass	(United Kingdom) Karen Cross	(Israel) Nataly Cahana (Israel) Oshri Shashua	6–4, 7–5
Winner	5.	25 September 1995	Telford, United Kingdom	Hard	(United Kingdom) Samantha Smith	(United Kingdom) Kaye Hand (Sweden) Anna-Karin Svensson	4–6, 7–6^{(8–6)}, 6–3
Runner–up	3.	2 October 1995	Nottingham, United Kingdom	Hard	(United Kingdom) Samantha Smith	(Sweden) Annica Lindstedt (Sweden) Sofia Finér	6–7^{(9–7)}, 5–7
Winner	6.	13 November 1995	Edinburgh, United Kingdom	Carpet	(Russia) Julia Lutrova	(United Kingdom) Shirli-Ann Siddall (United Kingdom) Amanda Wainwright	7–6^{(9–7)}, 6–4
Winner	7.	29 April 1996	Hatfield, United Kingdom	Clay	(Australia) Robyn Mawdsley	(United Kingdom) Amanda Wainwright (United Kingdom) Shirli-Ann Siddall	4–6, 7–6^{(7–4)}, 7–5
