= Alison Smith (tennis) =

British tennis player

- Country (sports): United Kingdom
- Born: 8 April 1970 (age 56)

Singles
- Career titles: 1 ITF
- Highest ranking: No. 513 (5 July 1993)

Grand Slam singles results
- Wimbledon: Q1 (1993, 1994)

Doubles
- Career titles: 4 ITF
- Highest ranking: No. 185 (31 October 1994)

Grand Slam doubles results
- Wimbledon: 1R (1994)

Alison Smith (born 8 April 1970) is a British former professional tennis player.

Smith, who comes from Staffordshire, played on the international tour in the early 1990s. She featured in the women's doubles main draw at the 1994 Wimbledon Championships, partnering Gaby Coorengel of the Netherlands.

== ITF finals ==
Legend
$25,000 tournaments
$10,000 tournaments

=== Singles: 1 (1–0) ===
Outcome	Date	Tournament	Surface	Opponent	Score
Winner	19 July 1992	Frinton, United Kingdom	Grass	(United Kingdom) Barbara Griffiths	6–3, 6–3

=== Doubles: 10 (4–6) ===
Outcome	No.	Date	Tournament	Surface	Partner	Opponents	Score
Runner-up	1.	21 July 1991	Frinton, United Kingdom	Grass	(United Kingdom) Katie Rickett	(United Kingdom) Caroline Billingham (United Kingdom) Virginia Humphreys-Davies	3–6, 1–6
Runner-up	2.	9 February 1992	Swansea, United Kingdom	Hard	(Switzerland) Susanna Locher	(Netherlands) Seda Noorlander (Netherlands) Eva Haslinghuis	3–6, 6–4, 4–6
Winner	1.	10 May 1992	Bath, United Kingdom	Clay	(United Kingdom) Tamsin Wainwright	(United Kingdom) Lorna Woodroffe (United Kingdom) Julie Pullin	6–1, 6–4
Runner-up	3.	17 May 1992	Bournemouth, United Kingdom	Hard	(United Kingdom) Tamsin Wainwright	(United Kingdom) Amanda Evans (Russia) Svetlana Parkhomenko	3–6, 6–2, 4–6
Runner-up	4.	3 October 1993	Bracknell, United Kingdom	Hard	(Netherlands) Caroline Stassen	(United Kingdom) Caroline Hunt (United Kingdom) Shirli-Ann Siddall	2–6, 1–6
Runner-up	5.	14 November 1993	Swindon, United Kingdom	Carpet	(Netherlands) Caroline Stassen	(Russia) Natalia Egorova (Russia) Svetlana Parkhomenko	0–6, 4–6
Runner-up	6.	21 November 1993	Swansea, United Kingdom	Hard	(Netherlands) Caroline Stassen	(Russia) Natalia Egorova (Russia) Svetlana Parkhomenko	1–6, 3–6
Winner	2.	6 February 1994	Telford, United Kingdom	Hard	(United Kingdom) Sara Tse	(Zimbabwe) Paula Iversen (Namibia) Elizma Nortje	4–6, 6–4, 6–4
Winner	3.	13 February 1994	Sunderland, United Kingdom	Hard	(Netherlands) Gaby Coorengel	(Netherlands) Caroline Stassen (Netherlands) Nathalie Thijssen	3–6, 6–1, 6–2
Winner	4.	20 March 1994	Reims, France	Clay	(Netherlands) Gaby Coorengel	(Czech Republic) Eva Melicharová (Czech Republic) Ivana Jankovská	4–6, 7–6, 7–5
