= Robyn Mawdsley =

Australian tennis player

- Country (sports): Australia
- Born: 3 May 1971 (age 54)
- Prize money: $43,941

Singles
- Career titles: 0
- Highest ranking: No. 366 (24 June 1996)

Doubles
- Career titles: 6 ITF
- Highest ranking: No. 182 (9 May 1994)

Grand Slam doubles results
- Australian Open: 1R (1991, 1994)

Robyn Mawdsley (born 3 May 1971) is an Australian former professional tennis player.

== Biography ==
Mawdsley competed on the professional tour in the 1990s, after playing college tennis in the United States for Texas A&M.

In her career, Mawdsley reached a best singles ranking of No. 366 in the world. She was more successful on tour as a doubles player. Ranked as high as 182 for doubles, she twice featured in the main draw of the Australian Open, in 1991 and 1994. She won a total of six doubles titles on the ITF Women's Circuit, four of which came in 1995.

== ITF finals ==
$50,000 tournaments
$25,000 tournaments
$10,000 tournaments

=== Singles (0–1) ===
Result	No.	Date	Tournament	Surface	Opponent	Score
Loss	1.	5 June 1995	ITF Dublin, Ireland	Clay	(Hungary) Katalin Miskolczi	2–6, 2–6

=== Doubles (6–12) ===
Result	No.	Date	Tournament	Surface	Partner	Opponents	Score
Loss	1.	23 April 1990	ITF Sutton, United Kingdom	Clay	(Australia) Lisa Keller	(Czechoslovakia) Radka Bobková (Czechoslovakia) Helena Vildová	6–7^{(8)}, 3–6
Loss	2.	6 May 1991	ITF Lee-on-the-Solent, UK	Clay	(Australia) Catherine Barclay	(Germany) Anke Marchl (Germany) Christina Singer	6–4, 6–7, 1–6
Loss	3.	29 June 1992	ITF Ronneby, Sweden	Clay	(Australia) Clare Thompson	(Sweden) Catarina Bernstein (Sweden) Annika Narbe	5–7, 0–6
Loss	4.	19 July 1992	ITF Frinton, United Kingdom	Grass	(Namibia) Elizma Nortje	(United Kingdom) Caroline Billingham (Australia) Danielle Thomas	2–6, 6–4, 6–7
Loss	5.	16 November 1992	ITF Port Pirie, Australia	Hard	(Australia) Joanne Limmer	(Australia) Danielle Jones (South Africa) Tessa Price	2–6, 7–5, 3–6
Loss	6.	14 March 1993	ITF Wodonga, Australia	Grass	(Australia) Danielle Thomas	(Australia) Kate McDonald (Australia) Jane Taylor	6–2, 3–6, 3–6
Loss	7.	21 March 1993	ITF Canberra, Australia	Grass	(Australia) Maija Avotins	(Australia) Kate McDonald (Australia) Jane Taylor	w/o
Win	1.	10 May 1993	ITF Basingstoke, United Kingdom	Hard	(United Kingdom) Valda Lake	(Germany) Sabine Haas (South Africa) Liezel Huber	3–6, 6–4, 6–1
Loss	8.	24 May 1993	ITF Barcelona, Spain	Clay	(Australia) Shannon Peters	(Latvia) Agnese Gustmane (Poland) Katarzyna Teodorowicz	6–7^{(2)}, 2–6
Loss	9.	25 October 1993	ITF Jakarta, Indonesia	Hard	(United Kingdom) Julie Pullin	(Japan) Ei Iida (Japan) Nana Smith	4–6, 5–7
Win	2.	24 April 1995	ITF Edinburgh, United Kingdom	Clay	(Australia) Lorna Woodroffe	(United Kingdom) Karen Cross (United Kingdom) Lizzie Jelfs	6–3, 6–1
Win	3.	8 May 1995	ITF Lee-on-the-Solent, UK	Clay	(Russia) Natalia Egorova	(United Kingdom) Kaye Hand (United Kingdom) Claire Taylor	7–6^{(0)}, 6–2
Win	4.	5 June 1995	ITF Dublin, Ireland	Clay	(Republic of Ireland) Karen Nugent	(Republic of Ireland) Claire Curran (Republic of Ireland) Yvonne Doyle	6–1, 4–6, 6–3
Win	5.	10 July 1995	ITF Felixstowe, United Kingdom	Grass	(Australia) Shannon Peters	(United Kingdom) Helen Crook (United Kingdom) Victoria Davies	6–1, 6–1
Loss	10.	17 July 1995	ITF Frinton, United Kingdom	Grass	(Australia) Shannon Peters	(Russia) Natalia Egorova (Russia) Julia Lutrova	6–7^{(2)}, 6–1, 4–6
Loss	11.	30 October 1995	ITF Saga, Japan	Grass	(Australia) Kirrily Sharpe	(Australia) Danielle Jones (South Africa) Tessa Price	4–6, 2–6
Win	6.	4 May 1996	ITF Hatfield, United Kingdom	Clay	(United Kingdom) Jane Wood	(United Kingdom) Shirli-Ann Siddall (United Kingdom) Amanda Wainwright	4–6, 7–6^{(4)}, 7–5
Loss	12.	16 June 1996	ITF Tashkent, Uzbekistan	Clay	(Germany) Katrin Kilsch	(Ukraine) Elena Brioukhovets (Ukraine) Elena Tatarkova	4–6, 2–6
