= Elizma Nortje =

Namibian tennis player and coach

- Country (sports): South Africa; Namibia
- Born: 1 February 1966 (age 59) Windhoek, South West Africa
- Prize money: $22,480

Singles
- Career record: 44–99
- Highest ranking: No. 447 (18 December 1989)

Doubles
- Career record: 67–83
- Career titles: 2 ITF
- Highest ranking: No. 280 (7 November 1994)

Grand Slam doubles results
- Wimbledon: Q3 (1991)

Elizma Nortje (born 1 February 1966) is a Namibian tennis coach and former professional player. She is the most successful Namibian woman to have played professionally and was the first to be ranked on the WTA Tour.

Born in Windhoek in 1966, Nortje represented South Africa as a junior and early in her professional career, before Namibian independence. She played collegiate tennis for United States International University in San Diego, competing in the NCAA Division I Championships. In the early 1990s she made appearances in the doubles qualifying draws at Wimbledon and won two ITF doubles tournaments.

Nortje served as president of the Namibian Tennis Association from 1996 to 1999 and was Namibia's team captain when the country made its Fed Cup debut in 2004. A certified ITF Level 3 coach, she is now the head tennis professional at the Van Der Meer Tennis Academy in South Carolina.

== ITF finals ==
=== Singles: 1 (0–1) ===
| Result | Date | Tournament | Surface | Opponent | Score |
|---|---|---|---|---|---|
| Loss | 3 April 1994 | Marsa, Malta | Clay | (Germany) Caroline Schneider | 6–7^{(2)}, 4–6 |

=== Doubles: 11 (2–9) ===
| Result | No. | Date | Tournament | Surface | Partner | Opponents | Score |
|---|---|---|---|---|---|---|---|
| Win | 1. | 28 April 1991 | Bracknell, United Kingdom | Hard | (United Kingdom) Barbara Griffiths | (United States) Lynn Nabors (Denmark) Merete Balling-Stockmann | 6–3, 6–2 |
| Loss | 1. | 4 August 1991 | Haifa, Israel | Hard | (South Africa) Janine Humphreys | (South Africa) Tessa Price (United States) Kirsten Dreyer | 1–6, 0–6 |
| Loss | 2. | 11 August 1991 | Ramat HaSharon, Israel | Hard | (South Africa) Janine Humphreys | (Israel) Ilana Berger (South Africa) Robyn Field | 0–6, 1–6 |
| Loss | 3. | 5 April 1992 | Windhoek, Namibia | Hard | (South Africa) Louise Venter | (South Africa) Cindy Summers (South Africa) Nicole Simunic | 6–3, 4–6, 3–6 |
| Win | 2. | 12 April 1992 | Gaborone, Botswana | Hard | (South Africa) Louise Venter | (South Africa) Liezel Horn (South Africa) Estelle Gevers | 6–0, 6–7^{(2)}, 6–4 |
| Loss | 4. | 19 July 1992 | Frinton, United Kingdom | Grass | (Australia) Robyn Mawdsley | (United Kingdom) Caroline Billingham (Australia) Danielle Thomas | 2–6, 6–4, 6–7 |
| Loss | 5. | 6 February 1994 | Tipton, United Kingdom | Hard | (Zimbabwe) Paula Iversen | (United Kingdom) Alison Smith (United Kingdom) Sara Tse | 6–4, 4–6, 4–6 |
| Loss | 6. | 3 April 1994 | Marsa, Malta | Clay | (Czech Republic) Ivana Havrlíková | (Poland) Isabela Listowska (Germany) Petra Winzenhöller | 6–7^{(5)}, 3–6 |
| Loss | 7. | 24 April 1994 | Nottingham, United Kingdom | Hard | (Netherlands) Caroline Stassen | (Australia) Shannon Peters (Australia) Nicole Oomens | 5–7, 2–6 |
| Loss | 8. | 30 October 1994 | Negril, Jamaica | Hard | (Colombia) Ximena Rodríguez | (South Africa) Kim Grant (United States) Claire Sessions Bailey | 2–6, 7–6^{(6)}, 3–6 |
| Loss | 9. | 18 June 1995 | Morelia, Mexico | Hard | (Colombia) Ximena Rodríguez | (United States) Tracey Hiete (Canada) Renata Kolbovic | 3–6, 5–7 |
