= Danielle Jones (tennis) =

Australian tennis player

- Country (sports): Australia
- Born: 4 March 1969 (age 56)
- Prize money: $142,404

Singles
- Career record: 92–145
- Career titles: 0
- Highest ranking: No. 218 (3 October 1994)

Grand Slam singles results
- Australian Open: 1R (1991)

Doubles
- Career record: 151–154
- Career titles: 14 ITF
- Highest ranking: No. 91 (27 October 1997)

Grand Slam doubles results
- Australian Open: 1R (1990, 1991, 1993, 1994, 1997, 1998, 1999)
- French Open: 2R (1994)
- Wimbledon: 2R (1992, 1996)
- US Open: 1R (1997)

Danielle Jones (born 4 March 1969) is a former professional tennis player from Australia.

== Biography ==
Jones comes from Melbourne and as a junior was runner-up in the girls' doubles at the 1987 Australian Open.

She competed on the professional tour in the 1990s. At the 1991 Australian Open she appeared in the singles main draw as a wildcard, where she lost in the first round to Larisa Savchenko-Neiland. Her best singles performance on the WTA Tour was a quarterfinal appearance at the Taipei Women's Championship in 1993, beating Cammy MacGregor and Rachel McQuillan en route. She had a win over then-world No. 23, Amy Frazier, at Eastbourne in 1994.

In doubles, she reached as high as 91 in the world in 1997 and was a semifinalist at the Auckland Open, partnering Esmé de Villiers. She featured in the main draw of the doubles at all four Grand Slam tournaments, which included seven Australian Open appearances.

== ITF Circuit finals ==
=== Singles (0–1) ===
$25,000 tournaments
$10,000 tournaments

Result	No.	Date	Tournament	Surface	Opponent	Score
Loss	1.	4 March 1990	ITF Canberra, Japan	Grass	(Australia) Janine Thompson	3–6, 0–6

=== Doubles (14–6) ===
Result	No.	Date	Tournament	Surface	Partner	Opponents	Score
Loss	1.	7 August 1988	ITF Roanoke, United States	Hard	(Australia) Lisa Keller	(Australia) Robyn Lamb (United States) Vincenza Procacci	4–6, 7–5, 3–6
Loss	2.	6 August 1989	Rheda-Wiedenbrück, West Germany	Clay	(Australia) Lisa Keller	(Czechoslovakia) Nora Bajčíková (Czechoslovakia) Petra Holubová	1–6, 2–6
Win	1.	17 September 1989	Setúbal, Portugal	Hard	(Australia) Lisa Keller	(Netherlands) Colette Sely (Netherlands) Esmir Hoogendoorn	6–1, 6–3
Win	2.	27 November 1989	Melbourne, Australia	Hard	(Hong Kong) Paulette Moreno	(United States) Allison Cooper (Australia) Justine Hodder	6–2, 6–2
Loss	3.	19 February 1990	Melbourne, Australia	Hard	(Australia) Sharon McNamara	(Japan) Yuko Hosoki (Japan) Ayako Hirose	3–6, 2–6
Win	3.	2 July 1990	Stuttgart, West Germany	Clay	(Australia) Kerry-Anne Guse	(Czechoslovakia) Ivana Jankovská (Czechoslovakia) Eva Melicharová	6–4, 6–7, 6–3
Win	4.	22 July 1991	Sezze, Italy	Clay	(Australia) Louise Pleming	(Netherlands) Ingelise Driehuis (Australia) Justine Hodder	6–3, 6–2
Win	5.	29 July 1991	Acireale, Italy	Clay	(Australia) Justine Hodder	(Italy) Gabriella Boschiero (United States) Kylie Johnson	6–4, 6–4
Loss	4.	9 March 1992	Wodonga, Australia	Gras	(Australia) Kristine Kunce	(New Zealand) Julie Richardson (New Zealand) Amanda Trail	4–6, 4–6
Loss	5.	16 March 1992	Canberra, Australia	Gras	(Australia) Kristine Kunce	(New Zealand) Julie Richardson (New Zealand) Amanda Trail	3–6, 3–6
Win	6.	13 July 1992	Evansville, United States	Hard	(South Africa) Tessa Price	(Canada) Mélanie Bernard (Canada) Caroline Delisle	6–2, 4–6, 6–4
Win	7.	20 July 1992	Roanoke, United States	Hard	(South Africa) Tessa Price	(Canada) Mélanie Bernard (South Africa) Cindy Summers	6–2, 6–2
Loss	6.	10 August 1992	York, United States	Hard	(South Africa) Tessa Price	(United States) Nicole Arendt (United States) Shannan McCarthy	3–6, 3–6
Win	8.	16 November 1992	Port Pirie, Australia	Hard	(South Africa) Tessa Price	(Australia) Joanne Limmer (Australia) Robyn Mawdsley	6–2, 5–7, 6–3
Win	9.	30 October 1995	Saga, Japan	Grass	(South Africa) Tessa Price	(Australia) Robyn Mawdsley (Australia) Kirrily Sharpe	6–4, 6–2
Win	10.	31 March 1996	Albury, Australia	Grass	(South Africa) Nannie de Villiers	(Japan) Tomoe Hotta (Australia) Angie Marik	7–6, 6–3
Win	11.	28 October 1996	Saga, Japan	Grass	(Thailand) Tamarine Tanasugarn	(Japan) Hiroko Mochizuki (Japan) Yuka Tanaka	6–2, 6–3
Win	12.	3 August 1997	Lexington, United States	Hard	(United States) Elly Hakami	(Japan) Kaoru Shibata (Slovenia) Katarina Srebotnik	6–2, 7–5
Win	13.	10 October 1997	Saga, Japan	Grass	(Japan) Saori Obata	(South Africa) Surina De Beer (Japan) Nami Urabe	6–3, 6–4
Win	14.	29 November 1998	ITF Nuriootpa, Australia	Hard	(Canada) Vanessa Webb	(Australia) Catherine Barclay (Australia) Trudi Musgrave	6–3, 7–5
