= Lucie Ahl =

English tennis player

- Country (sports): Great Britain; England
- Residence: Exeter, Devon, England
- Born: 23 July 1974 (age 51) Exeter, Devon, England
- Height: 1.59 m (5 ft 3 in)
- Turned pro: 1991
- Retired: 2003
- Plays: Right-handed (two-handed backhand)
- Prize money: US$260,389

Singles
- Career record: 288–273
- Career titles: 0 WTA, 9 ITF
- Highest ranking: No. 161 (1 April 2002)

Grand Slam singles results
- Australian Open: Q3 (2002)
- French Open: Q1 (2000, 2001, 2002, 2003)
- Wimbledon: 2R (2000)
- US Open: Q2 (2002)

Doubles
- Career record: 102–140
- Career titles: 0 WTA, 6 ITF
- Highest ranking: No. 213 (3 February 1997)

Lucie Ahl (born 23 July 1974) is a tennis coach and a former professional tennis player. She was briefly the British No.1, holding the position for 9 non-consecutive weeks between 30 July 2001 and 5 May 2002. She reached her highest singles ranking of world No.161 on 1 April 2002.

In her career, Ahl won a total of 15 titles on the ITF Women's Circuit and also participated on the WTA Tour. She had career wins over ITF & WTA Tour players Sandra Cacic and Rene Simpson.

Her best Grand Slam performance came at the 2000 Wimbledon Championships, where she defeated Austrian Barbara Schwartz in round one to capture the first and only win of her career in Grand Slam competition. Ahl also represented Great Britain at the Fed Cup on one occasion, winning all three of her rubbers and thus remaining undefeated in Fed Cup action. Brother Daniel was ranked number 1 on the ITF world over 35 ratings in 2007

== ITF circuit finals ==
=== Singles (9–7) ===
Finals by category $100,000 tournaments (0/0) $75,000 tournaments (0/0) $50,000 tournaments (0/0) $25,000 tournaments (5/1) $10,000 tournaments (4/6)	Finals by surface Hard (3/0) Clay (0/2) Grass (3/3) Carpet (3/0)

Result	Date	Category	Tournament	Surface	Opponent	Score
Win	5 July 1993	ITF $10,000	Frinton, United Kingdom	Grass	(United Kingdom) Julie Pullin	6–1, 3–6, 6–1
Loss	3 October 1994	ITF $10,000	Nottingham, Great Britain	Carpet	(France) Anne-Gaëlle Sidot	4–6, 2–6
Loss	6 February 1995	ITF $10,000	Sheffield, United Kingdom	Hard	(Russia) Olga Ivanova	3–6, 4–6
Win	11 August 1996	ITF $10,000	Southsea, United Kingdom	Grass	(Australia) Cindy Watson	6–3, 6–3
Win	29 September 1996	ITF $10,000	Telford, United Kingdom	Hard (i)	(United Kingdom) Julie Pullin	6–3, 6–7, 6–3
Loss	25 March 1997	ITF $10,000	Warrnambool, Australia	Grass	(United Kingdom) Shirli-Ann Siddall	3–6, 3–6
Loss	4 May 1997	ITF $10,000	Hatfield, Great Britain	Clay	(United Kingdom) Shirli-Ann Siddall	2–6, 0–6
Loss	25 April 1998	ITF $10,000	Bournemouth, Great Britain	Clay	(United Kingdom) Joanne Ward	6–7, 4–6
Loss	11 July 1998	ITF $10,000	Felixstowe, Great Britain	Grass	(South Africa) Mareze Joubert	5–7, 3–6
Win	18 July 1998	ITF $10,000	Frinton, Great Britain	Grass	(Australia) Lisa McShea	W/O
Win	26 July 1998	ITF $25,000	Dublin, Ireland	Carpet	(Hungary) Petra Mandula	7–6, 6–3
Win	18 April 1999	ITF $25,000	Cagnes-sur-Mer, France	Hard	(France) Virginie Razzano	4–6, 7–5, 6–2
Win	25 July 1999	ITF $25,000	Dublin, Ireland	Carpet	(Russia) Julia Lutrova	6–1, 6–3
Win	30 July 2000	ITF $25,000	Dublin, Ireland	Carpet	(South Africa) Mareze Joubert	6–2, 6–4
Win	15 October 2000	ITF $25,000	Welwyn, Great Britain	Hard	(Italy) Antonella Serra Zanetti	4–2, 4–2, 4–1
Loss	15 July 2001	ITF $25,000	Felixstowe, Great Britain	Grass	(Italy) Roberta Vinci	5–7, 5–7

=== Doubles (6–9) ===
Finals by category $100,000 tournaments (0/0) $75,000 tournaments (0/0) $50,000 tournaments (0/0) $25,000 tournaments (1/2) $10,000 tournaments (5/7)	Finals by surface Hard (2/1) Clay (3/4) Grass (1/4) Carpet (0/0)

Result	Date	Category	Tournament	Surface	Partnering	Opponent	Score
Win	11 May 1992	ITF $10,000	Dublin, Ireland	Hard (i)	(United Kingdom) Julie Salmon	(Republic of Ireland) Gina Niland (Republic of Ireland) Siobhán Nicholson	7–5, 7–5
Loss	31 July 1995	ITF $10,000	Ilkley, United Kingdom	Clay	(United Kingdom) Joanne Ward	(United Kingdom) Jasmine Choudhury (United Kingdom) Louise Latimer	6–1, 2–6, 2–6
Win	18 February 1996	ITF $10,000	Sheffield, United Kingdom	Hard (i)	(United Kingdom) Joanne Ward	(United Kingdom) Julie Pullin (United Kingdom) Lorna Woodroffe	7–6, 6–3
Loss	12 May 1996	ITF $10,000	Lee-on-Solent, United Kingdom	Clay	(United Kingdom) Joanne Ward	(United Kingdom) Shirli-Ann Siddall (United Kingdom) Amanda Wainwright	5–7, 1–6
Loss	14 July 1996	ITF $10,000	Felixstowe, United Kingdom	Clay	(United Kingdom) Shirli-Ann Siddall	(South Africa) Surina de Beer (United Kingdom) Katia Roubanova	2–6, 4–6
Win	21 July 1996	ITF $10,000	Frinton, United Kingdom	Grass	(United Kingdom) Shirli-Ann Siddall	(Australia) Amy Jensen (Hungary) Anita Kurimay	6–1, 6–4
Loss	4 August 1996	ITF $10,000	Ilkley, United Kingdom	Grass	(United Kingdom) Shirli-Ann Siddall	(South Africa) Surina de Beer (United Kingdom) Katia Roubanova	1–6, 7–6, 3–6
Win	11 August 1996	ITF $10,000	Southsea, United Kingdom	Grass	(United Kingdom) Shirli-Ann Siddall	(United Kingdom) Louise Latimer (United Kingdom) Lorna Woodroffe	6–2, 7–6
Loss	4 May 1997	ITF $10,000	Hatfield, United Kingdom	Clay	(South Africa) Jessica Steck	(United Kingdom) Shirli-Ann Siddall (United Kingdom) Joanne Ward	6–3, 4–6, 5–7
Win	4 October 1997	ITF $10,000	Nottingham, United Kingdom	Hard	(United Kingdom) Joanne Ward	(United Kingdom) Karen Cross (United Kingdom) Lizzie Jelfs	6–2, 7–6
Loss	11 July 1998	ITF $10,000	Felixstowe, United Kingdom	Grass	(United Kingdom) Amanda Wainwright	(Australia) Lisa McShea (Australia) Trudi Musgrave	4–6, 6–7
Loss	18 July 1998	ITF $10,000	Frinton, United Kingdom	Grass	(United Kingdom) Amanda Wainwright	(United Kingdom) Lizzie Jelfs (South Africa) Mareze Joubert	2–6, 5–7
Loss	16 July 2000	ITF $25,000	Felixstowe, United Kingdom	Grass	(Soviet Union) Natalia Egorova	(Australia) Trudi Musgrave (United Kingdom) Lorna Woodroffe	4–6, 6–3, 4–6
Loss	3 November 2002	ITF $25,000	Nottingham, United Kingdom	Hard	(Tunisia) Selima Sfar	(South Africa) Kim Grant (United States) Lilia Osterloh	1–6, 2–6
Win	20 April 2003	ITF $25,000	Biarritz, France	Clay	(Tunisia) Selima Sfar	(Ukraine) Yuliya Beygelzimer (Ukraine) Anna Zaporozhanova	6–1, 6–1

== Performance timelines ==
Key
W	F	SF	QF	#R	RR	Q#	DNQ	A	NH

(W) winner; (F) finalist; (SF) semifinalist; (QF) quarterfinalist; (#R) rounds 4, 3, 2, 1; (RR) round-robin stage; (Q#) qualification round; (DNQ) did not qualify; (A) absent; (NH) not held; (SR) strike rate (events won / competed); (W–L) win–loss record.

=== Singles ===
Tournament	1993	1994	1995	1996	1997	1998	1999	2000	2001	2002	2003	Career win–loss
Australian Open	A	A	A	A	A	A	A	Q1	Q1	Q3	Q1	0–0
French Open	A	A	A	A	A	A	A	Q1	Q1	Q1	Q1	0–0
Wimbledon	Q2	Q1	Q1	Q1	1R	Q1	1R	2R	1R	1R	1R	1–6
US Open	A	A	A	A	Q1	Q1	Q1	Q1	Q1	Q2	Q1	0–0
Year-end ranking	405	373	349	331	179	225	168	185	200	203	258	N/A

=== Doubles ===
Tournament	1998	1999	2000	2001	2002	2003	Career win–loss
Australian Open	A	A	A	A	A	A	0–0
French Open	A	A	A	A	A	A	0–0
Wimbledon	1R	A	A	1R	1R	1R	0–4
US Open	A	A	A	A	A	A	0–0
Year-end ranking	372	303	407	350	471	360	N/A

=== Mixed doubles ===
Tournament	2002	2003	Career win–loss
Australian Open	A	A	0–0
French Open	A	A	0–0
Wimbledon	1R	1R	0–2
US Open	A	A	0–0

=== Fed Cup ===
Europe/Africa Group II
Date	Venue	Surface	Round	Opponents	Final match score	Match	Opponent	Rubber score
9–13 April 2002	Pretoria	Hard	RR	Malta	3–0	Singles	Rosanne Dimech	6–1, 6–2 (W)
9–13 April 2002	Pretoria	Hard	RR	Norway	3–0	Doubles (with Rachel Viollet)	Aksdal/Sartz	6–0, 6–0 (W)
9–13 April 2002	Pretoria	Hard	PO (Promotion)	Lithuania	2–0	Singles	Edita Liachovičiūtė	6–3, 6–1 (W)

Preceded by Louise Latimer; Julie Pullin	British Tennis number one 30 July 2001 – 5 August 2001; 18 March 2002 – 5 May 2002	Succeeded by Julie Pullin; Julie Pullin
