= Barbara Griffiths =

British tennis player

- Country (sports): United Kingdom
- Born: 20 May 1972 (age 52); Hillingdon, Middlesex, England
- Prize money: $19,091

Singles
- Highest ranking: No. 426 (27 July 1992)

Grand Slam singles results
- Wimbledon: 1R (1991)

Doubles
- Highest ranking: No. 206 (2 December 1991)

Grand Slam doubles results
- Wimbledon: 2R (1991)

Barbara Griffiths (born 20 May 1972) is a British former professional tennis player.

== Biography ==
Griffiths, who comes from Middlesex, broke through for her first ITF titles in 1989, winning both the singles and doubles at Dublin.

At the 1991 Wimbledon Championships, Griffiths received a wildcard to compete in the women's singles main draw. The highest ranked player in the draw, Griffiths was beaten in the first round by former quarter-finalist Claudia Kohde-Kilsch, but reached the second round of the women's doubles, partnering Jane Wood.

== ITF finals ==
Legend
$25,000 tournaments
$10,000 tournaments

=== Singles (1–1) ===
Result	No.	Date	Tournament	Surface	Opponent	Score
Win	1.	16 July 1989	Dublin, Ireland	Grass	(United Kingdom) Virginia Humphreys-Davies	7–5, 7–6^{(4)}
Loss	1.	19 July 1992	Frinton, United Kingdom	Grass	(United Kingdom) Alison Smith	3–6, 3–6

=== Doubles (3–1) ===
Result	No.	Date	Tournament	Surface	Partner	Opponents	Score
Win	1.	16 July 1989	Dublin, Ireland	Grass	(United Kingdom) Rachel Viollet	(Netherlands) Pascale Druyts (West Germany) Cora Linneman	6–3, 6–4
Win	2.	28 April 1991	Bracknell, United Kingdom	Hard	(Namibia) Elizma Nortje	(United States) Lynn Nabors (Denmark) Merete Balling-Stockmann	6–3, 6–2
Win	3.	19 August 1991	Jerusalem, Israel	Hard	(United Kingdom) Jane Wood	(Israel) Ilana Berger (South Africa) Robyn Field	6–3, 6–7, 6–1
Loss	1.	10 November 1991	Manchester, United Kingdom	Carpet (i)	(Bulgaria) Lubomira Bacheva	(United Kingdom) Amanda Grunfeld (United Kingdom) Julie Salmon	6–7^{(2)}, 1–6
