= Ingelise Driehuis =

Dutch tennis player

- Full name: Ingelise Driehuis
- Country (sports): Netherlands
- Born: 17 September 1967 (age 57)
- Prize money: $121,439

Singles
- Career record: 76–91
- Highest ranking: No. 264 (25 November 1991)

Grand Slam singles results
- Australian Open: 1R (1991)

Doubles
- Career record: 147–90
- Highest ranking: No. 87 (4 July 1994)

Grand Slam doubles results
- Australian Open: 2R (1991)
- French Open: 3R (1992)
- Wimbledon: QF (1994)
- US Open: 2R (1993)

Ingelise Driehuis (born 17 September 1967) is a former professional tennis player from the Netherlands.

== Biography ==
Driehuis played collegiate tennis in the United States, first at Clemson University, before transferring to the University of Florida in 1987. She is a member of the Clemson Athletic Hall of Fame.

In the early 1990s she competed as a professional, mainly in doubles, with a best ranking of 87 in the world. As a singles player her most notable achievement was qualifying for the main draw of the 1991 Australian Open, where she lost a close first-round match to Andrea Leand, 6–8 in the third set. She was a regular in the doubles draws of grand slam tournaments and made the quarter-finals of the women's doubles at the 1994 Wimbledon Championships, partnering Maja Murić.

She now works as a lawyer and runs her own firm in Wassenaar.

== ITF finals ==
=== Singles: 1 (1–0) ===
$50,000 tournaments
$25,000 tournaments
$10,000 tournaments

Result	No.	Date	Tournament	Surface	Opponent	Score
Win	1.	6 July 1987	Seabrook, United States	Clay	(United States) Elizabeth Galphin	6–2, 6–4

=== Doubles: 28 (16-12) ===
Result	No.	Date	Tournament	Surface	Partner	Opponents	Score
Win	1.	21 July 1986	Amersfoort, Netherlands	Clay	(Netherlands) Simone Schilder	(United Kingdom) Kaye Hand (United Kingdom) Valda Lake	6–1, 4–6, 6–0
Win	2.	1 June 1987	Brandon, United States	Clay	(South Africa) Lise Gregory	(United States) Kathy Foxworth (United States) Tammy Whittington	7–6^{(3)}, 6–7^{(8)}, 6–4
Win	3.	8 June 1987	Key Biscayne, United States	Hard	(South Africa) Lise Gregory	(United States) Kathy Foxworth (United States) Tammy Whittington	3–6, 7–6^{(4)}, 6–2
Win	4.	15 June 1987	Birmingham, United States	Hard	(South Africa) Lise Gregory	(United States) Katrina Adams (United States) Sonia Hahn	6–7^{(0)}, 6–4, 6–2
Win	5.	29 June 1987	Litchfield, United States	Clay	(South Africa) Lise Gregory	(South Africa) Paulette Roux (United States) Rita Winebarger	7–5, 6–2
Win	6.	6 July 1987	Seabrook, United States	Clay	(South Africa) Lise Gregory	(United States) Kathy Foxworth (United States) Tammy Whittington	6–1, 6–2
Win	7.	13 July 1987	Fayetteville, United States	Clay	(United States) Kathy Foxworth	(Australia) Robyn Lamb (United States) Sylvia Schenck	6–2, 2–6, 6–3
Win	8.	20 July 1987	Philadelphia, United States	Hard	(United States) Katrina Adams	(United States) Kathy Foxworth (United States) Tammy Whittington	6–3, 6–4
Win	9.	28 September 1987	Bethesda, United States	Hard	(Canada) Jill Hetherington	(United States) Dena Levy (United States) Jane Thomas	6–1, 6–3
Loss	10.	5 June 1989	Cascais, Portugal	Clay	(United States) Holly Danforth	(South Africa) Robyn Field (Republic of Ireland) Lesley O'Halloran	2–6, 6–2, 4–6
Win	11.	12 June 1989	Algarve, Portugal	Hard	(Brazil) Themis Zambrzycki	(South Africa) Robyn Field (South Africa) Michelle Anderson	6–2, 4–6, 6–0
Win	12.	19 June 1989	Madeira, Portugal	Hard	(United Kingdom) Alexandra Niepel	(Czechoslovakia) Petra Holubová (Czechoslovakia) Alice Noháčová	6–3, 6–1
Loss	13.	10 July 1989	Erlangen, West Germany	Clay	(United States) Jennifer Fuchs	(West Germany) Andrea Betzner (West Germany) Wiltrud Probst	2–6, 3–6
Loss	14.	20 November 1989	Bulleen, Australia	Hard	(United States) Alysia May	(Japan) Rika Hiraki (New Zealand) Claudine Toleafoa	6–7, 4–6
Loss	15.	28 May 1990	Lisbon, Portugal	Clay	(Australia) Justine Hodder	(Spain) Ana-Belén Quintana (Spain) Ana Segura	0–6, 2–6
Win	16.	4 June 1990	Lisbon, Portugal	Clay	(Australia) Justine Hodder	(Spain) Ana-Belén Quintana (Spain) Ana Segura	6–3, 6–3
Loss	17.	11 June 1990	Cascais, Portugal	Clay	(Australia) Louise Pleming	(Belgium) Els Callens (Belgium) Caroline Wuillot	6–2, 4–6, 6–7^{(6)}
Win	18.	16 July 1990	Schwarzach, Austria	Clay	(Australia) Louise Pleming	(West Germany) Cora Linneman (New Zealand) Ruth Seeman	6–2, 6–0
Win	19.	27 August 1990	Palermo, Italy	Clay	(Australia) Louise Pleming	(France) Emmanuelle Derly (Austria) Sandra Reichel	6–1, 6–1
Loss	20.	18 November 1990	Nuriootpa, Australia	Hard	(Australia) Louise Pleming	(Indonesia) Yayuk Basuki (Indonesia) Suzanna Wibowo	6–7, 1–6
Loss	21.	1 April 1991	Moulins, France	Hard	(Australia) Louise Pleming	(France) Catherine Suire (France) Sandrine Testud	3–6, 4–6
Loss	22.	22 July 1991	Sezze, Italy	Clay	(Australia) Justine Hodder	(Australia) Danielle Jones (Australia) Louise Pleming	3–6, 2–6
Loss	23.	19 August 1991	Spoleto, Italy	Clay	(Australia) Louise Pleming	(Spain) Ana Segura (Spain) Janet Souto	6–3, 6–7, 4–6
Loss	24.	11 November 1991	Mount Gambier, Australia	Hard	(Australia) Louise Pleming	(Australia) Kristin Godridge (Australia) Nicole Pratt	7–6, 3–6, 4–6
Loss	25.	25 November 1991	Mildura, Australia	Hard	(Australia) Louise Pleming	(Australia) Catherine Barclay (Australia) Louise Stacey	4–6, 3–6
Win	26.	30 March 1992	Moulins, France	Clay	(Netherlands) Simone Schilder	(Czechoslovakia) Petra Kučová (Czechoslovakia) Eva Martincová	6–4, 7–5
Win	27.	20 April 1992	Ramat HaSharon, Israel	Hard	(Netherlands) Carin Bakkum	(Netherlands) Gaby Coorengel (Israel) Yael Segal	6–2, 6–1
Loss	28.	2 November 1992	Machida, Japan	Grass	(Japan) Maya Kidowaki	(New Zealand) Julie Richardson (Australia) Michelle Jaggard-Lai	3–6, 5–7
