= Tammy Whittington =

American tennis player

- Full name: Tammy Whittington
- Country (sports): United States
- Born: October 12, 1965 (age 61)
- Prize money: $112,404

Singles
- Highest ranking: No. 105 (August 10, 1992)

Grand Slam singles results
- Wimbledon: 2R (1992)
- US Open: 1R (1992)

Doubles
- Highest ranking: No. 119 (March 8, 1993)

Grand Slam doubles results
- Australian Open: 2R (1993)
- French Open: 2R (1993)
- Wimbledon: 2R (1993)
- US Open: 1R (1990)

Tammy Whittington (born October 12, 1965) is a former American tennis player.

== Biography ==
Whittington played college tennis in 1980s for the University of Florida, where she came to from Plantation High School in Broward County. She was a singles All-American for the Gators in both 1985 and 1987. After graduating in 1987 she turned professional.

On the professional circuit, Whittington reached a best ranking of 105 for singles. Her best performance on the WTA Tour was a quarter-final appearance at the 1991 Virginia Slims of Nashville, beating world number 50 Florencia Labat en route. She made the second round of the 1992 Wimbledon Championships. As a doubles player she won nine ITF titles and featured in the main draw of all four grand slam tournaments.
