= Caroline Billingham =

British tennis player

- Full name: Caroline Billingham-Jones
- Country (sports): United Kingdom
- Born: 12 July 1967 (age 57)
- Prize money: $25,884

Singles
- Highest ranking: No. 359 (9 November 1992)

Doubles
- Highest ranking: No. 237 (20 November 1989)

Grand Slam doubles results
- Wimbledon: 1R (1987)

Caroline Billingham-Jones (born 12 July 1967) is a British former professional tennis player.

== Biography ==
Billingham is a daughter of Labour politician Angela Billingham, Baroness of Banbury.

Educated at Banbury School, Billingham joined the international tennis circuit in the late 1980s. She competed regularly in Wimbledon qualifying during her career and made a main draw appearance in the women's doubles at the 1987 Wimbledon Championships. Her four ITF doubles titles included one $25,000 tournament, in Nigeria in 1991. As a singles player she reached a best ranking of 359 in the world and was the joint winner of the 1992 Scottish Championships.

She is a former captain of the Oxfordshire women's county side, holding the position for 12 years.

== ITF finals ==
$25,000 tournaments
$10,000 tournaments

=== Doubles (4–5) ===
| Result | No. | Date | Tournament | Surface | Partner | Opponents | Score |
|---|---|---|---|---|---|---|---|
| Loss | 1. | 11 January 1988 | Moulins, France | Clay | (United Kingdom) Anne Simpkin | (France) Karine Quentrec (France) Nathalie Herreman | 3–6, 3–6 |
| Loss | 2. | 17 October 1988 | Azores, Portugal | Hard | (United Kingdom) Alexandra Niepel | (Sweden) Helena Dahlström (Finland) Anne Aallonen | 3–6, 3–6 |
| Loss | 3. | 27 February 1989 | Jaffa, Israel | Hard | (Poland) Sylvia Czopek | (Netherlands) Marianne van der Torre (Netherlands) Caroline Vis | 6–3, 1–6, 3–6 |
| Loss | 4. | 7 May 1989 | Bournemouth, UK | Clay | (Hungary) Andrea Noszály | (Sweden) Catarina Bernstein (Argentina) Federica Haumüller | 0–6, 6–4, 2–6 |
| Loss | 5. | 21 January 1990 | Jakarta, Indonesia | Hard | (United Kingdom) Alexandra Niepel | (Indonesia) Yayuk Basuki (Indonesia) Suzanna Wibowo | w/o |
| Win | 1. | 29 April 1991 | Basingstoke, UK | Hard | (Republic of Ireland) Lesley O'Halloran | (United Kingdom) Virginia Humphreys-Davies (United Kingdom) Valda Lake | 7–5, 3–6, 6–4 |
| Win | 2. | 21 July 1991 | Frinton, UK | Grass | (United Kingdom) Virginia Humphreys-Davies | (United Kingdom) Alison Smith (United Kingdom) Katie Rickett | 6–3, 6–1 |
| Win | 3. | 24 November 1991 | Benin City, Nigeria | Hard | (United Kingdom) Virginia Humphreys-Davies | (United Kingdom) Amanda Evans (United States) Aurora Gima | 1–6, 6–4, 6–4 |
| Win | 4. | 19 July 1992 | Frinton, UK | Grass | (Australia) Danielle Thomas | (Australia) Robyn Mawdsley (Namibia) Elizma Nortje | 6–2, 4–6, 7–6 |
