= Jessica Emmons =

American tennis player

- Full name: Jessica Schlotterback (Emmons)
- Country (sports): United States
- Born: September 13, 1970 (age 54)
- Prize money: $137,272

Singles
- Career record: 111–76
- Highest ranking: No. 131 (February 3, 1992)

Grand Slam singles results
- Australian Open: 2R (1992)
- US Open: 1R (1991, 1992)

Doubles
- Career record: 63–53
- Highest ranking: No. 71 (March 1, 1993)

Grand Slam doubles results
- Australian Open: 2R (1993, 1994)
- French Open: 2R (1993)
- Wimbledon: 1R (1993)
- US Open: 2R (1992)

Jessica Schlotterback (born September 13, 1970) is an American former professional tennis player. She competed under her maiden name Jessica Emmons.

== Biography ==
A right-handed player from Phoenix, Emmons played college tennis for the UCLA Bruins, earning All-American honors in 1988 and 1989.

Emmons toured professionally in the early 1990s and reached a best singles ranking of 131. She made her grand slam main draw debut at the 1991 US Open, where she took 15th seed Helena Suková to three sets in a first-round loss. As a doubles player she featured in the main draw of all four grand slam tournaments and was ranked as high as 71 in the world.
