= 1992 ATP Tour =

Men's tennis circuit

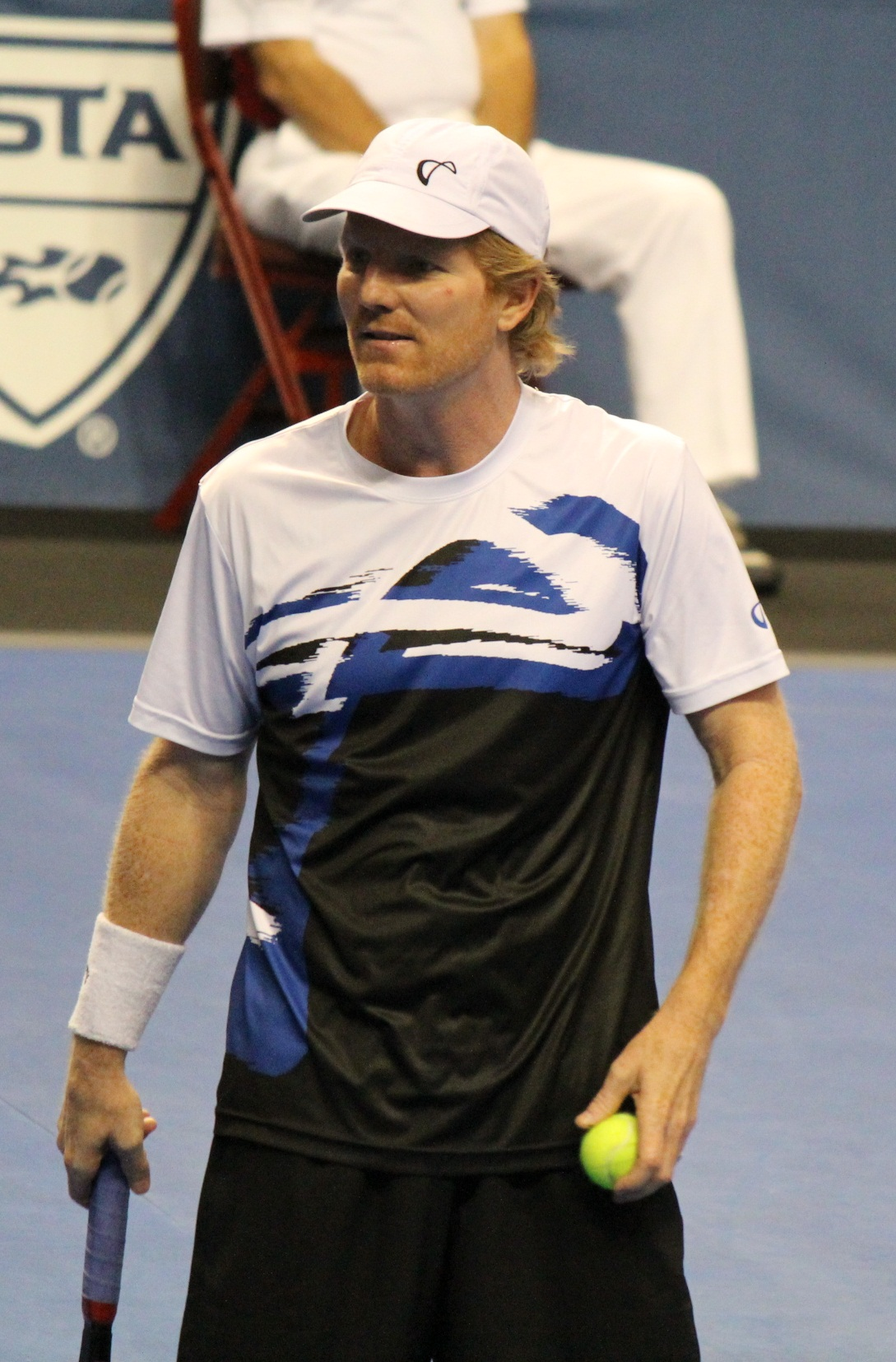
- Jim Courier finished the year ranked world No. 1 for the first time in his career. He won five titles during the season, including two majors at the Australian Open and the French Open. He also won a ATP Championship Series, Single Week event.

Details
- Duration: 30 December 1991 – 16 November 1992
- Edition: 3rd
- Tournaments: 83
- Categories: Grand Slam (4); ATP Tour World Championships; Summer Olympic Games; ATP Championship Series, Single-Week (9); ATP Championship Series (12); ATP World Series (56); Team Events (2)

Achievements (singles)
- Most titles: (Germany) Boris Becker (5) (United States) Jim Courier (5) (United States) Pete Sampras (5)
- Most finals: (United States) Jim Courier (9)
- Prize money leader: (Germany) Michael Stich ($2,563,726)
- Points leader: (United States) Jim Courier (3599)

Awards
- Player of the year: (United States) Jim Courier
- Doubles team of the year: (Australia) Todd Woodbridge; (Australia) Mark Woodforde
- Most improved player of the year: (Sweden) Henrik Holm
- Newcomer of the year: (Commonwealth of Independent States) Andrei Medvedev
- Comeback player of the year: (France) Henri Leconte

The IBM Association of Tennis Professionals (ATP) Tour is the elite tour for professional tennis organized by the ATP tour. The IBM ATP Tour includes the Grand Slam tournaments (organized by the International Tennis Federation, ITF), the ATP Super 9, the ATP Championship Series, the ATP World Series, the ATP World Team Cup, the Davis Cup (organized by the ITF), the ATP Tour World Championships and the Grand Slam Cup (organized by the ITF).

== Schedule ==
This is the complete schedule of events on the 1992 IBM ATP Tour, with player progression documented from the quarterfinals stage.

Key

Grand Slam
ATP Tour World Championships
Olympic Games
ATP Championship Series, Single-Week
ATP Championship Series
ATP World Series
Team Events

=== January ===
Week	Tournament	Champions	Runners-up	Semifinalists	Quarterfinalists
30 Dec	Hopman Cup; Perth, Australia; ITF Mixed Team Championships; Hard (i) – 8 teams (RR)	Switzerland; 2–1	Czechoslovakia	Germany; Spain	France; United States; CIS; Netherlands
30 Dec	Australian Hardcourt Championships; Adelaide, Australia; ATP World Series; Hard – $157,500 – 32S/16D; Singles – Doubles	(Croatia) Goran Ivanišević; 1–6, 7–6^{(7–5)}, 6–4	(Sweden) Christian Bergström	(United States) Bryan Shelton (Germany) Carl-Uwe Steeb	(Switzerland) Marc Rosset (France) Rodolphe Gilbert (Sweden) Thomas Enqvist (France) Olivier Delaître
30 Dec	Australian Hardcourt Championships; Adelaide, Australia; ATP World Series; Hard – $157,500 – 32S/16D; Singles – Doubles	(Croatia) Goran Ivanišević (Switzerland) Marc Rosset; 7–6, 7–6	(Australia) Mark Kratzmann (Australia) Jason Stoltenberg	(United States) Bryan Shelton (Germany) Carl-Uwe Steeb	(Switzerland) Marc Rosset (France) Rodolphe Gilbert (Sweden) Thomas Enqvist (France) Olivier Delaître
30 Dec	BP Nationals; Wellington, New Zealand; ATP World Series; Hard – $157,500 – 32S/16D	(United States) Jeff Tarango; 6–1, 6–0, 6–3	(Commonwealth of Independent States) Alexander Volkov	(United States) MaliVai Washington (Germany) Lars Koslowski	(Czechoslovakia) Libor Němeček (Italy) Diego Nargiso (New Zealand) Kelly Evernden (Netherlands) Paul Haarhuis
30 Dec	BP Nationals; Wellington, New Zealand; ATP World Series; Hard – $157,500 – 32S/16D	(United States) Jared Palmer (United States) Jonathan Stark; 6–3, 6–3	(Netherlands) Michiel Schapers (Czechoslovakia) Daniel Vacek	(United States) MaliVai Washington (Germany) Lars Koslowski	(Czechoslovakia) Libor Němeček (Italy) Diego Nargiso (New Zealand) Kelly Evernden (Netherlands) Paul Haarhuis
6 Jan	NSW Open; Sydney, Australia; ATP World Series; Hard – $235,000 – 32S/16D; Singles – Doubles	(Spain) Emilio Sánchez; 6–3, 6–4	(France) Guy Forget	(Italy) Omar Camporese (United States) David Wheaton	(Austria) Thomas Muster (Sweden) Christian Bergström (United States) Aaron Krickstein (Switzerland) Jakob Hlasek
6 Jan	NSW Open; Sydney, Australia; ATP World Series; Hard – $235,000 – 32S/16D; Singles – Doubles	(Spain) Sergio Casal (Spain) Emilio Sánchez; 3–6, 6–1, 6–4	(United States) Scott Davis (United States) Kelly Jones	(Italy) Omar Camporese (United States) David Wheaton	(Austria) Thomas Muster (Sweden) Christian Bergström (United States) Aaron Krickstein (Switzerland) Jakob Hlasek
6 Jan	Benson and Hedges Open; Auckland, New Zealand; ATP World Series; Hard – $157,500 – 32S/16D; Singles – Doubles	(Peru) Jaime Yzaga; 7–6^{(8–6)} 6–4	(United States) MaliVai Washington	(Canada) Grant Connell (Germany) Markus Zoecke	(New Zealand) Kelly Evernden (Germany) Markus Naewie (Commonwealth of Independent States) Alexander Volkov (Commonwealth of Independent States) Andrei Cherkasov
6 Jan	Benson and Hedges Open; Auckland, New Zealand; ATP World Series; Hard – $157,500 – 32S/16D; Singles – Doubles	(South Africa) Wayne Ferreira (United States) Jim Grabb; 6–4 6–3	(Canada) Grant Connell (Canada) Glenn Michibata	(Canada) Grant Connell (Germany) Markus Zoecke	(New Zealand) Kelly Evernden (Germany) Markus Naewie (Commonwealth of Independent States) Alexander Volkov (Commonwealth of Independent States) Andrei Cherkasov
13 Jan; 20 Jan	Australian Open; Melbourne, Australia; Grand Slam; Hard – $1,895,685 – 128S/64D/32XD; Singles – Doubles – Mixed doubles	(United States) Jim Courier; 6–3, 3–6, 6–4, 6–2	(Sweden) Stefan Edberg	(South Africa) Wayne Ferreira (Netherlands) Richard Krajicek	(Czechoslovakia) Ivan Lendl (United States) John McEnroe (Germany) Michael Stich (Israel) Amos Mansdorf
13 Jan; 20 Jan	Australian Open; Melbourne, Australia; Grand Slam; Hard – $1,895,685 – 128S/64D/32XD; Singles – Doubles – Mixed doubles	(Australia) Todd Woodbridge (Australia) Mark Woodforde; 6–4, 6–3, 6–4	(United States) Kelly Jones (United States) Rick Leach	(South Africa) Wayne Ferreira (Netherlands) Richard Krajicek	(Czechoslovakia) Ivan Lendl (United States) John McEnroe (Germany) Michael Stich (Israel) Amos Mansdorf
13 Jan; 20 Jan	Australian Open; Melbourne, Australia; Grand Slam; Hard – $1,895,685 – 128S/64D/32XD; Singles – Doubles – Mixed doubles	(Australia) Nicole Provis (Australia) Mark Woodforde; 6–3, 4–6, 11–9	(Spain) Arantxa Sánchez Vicario (Australia) Todd Woodbridge	(South Africa) Wayne Ferreira (Netherlands) Richard Krajicek	(Czechoslovakia) Ivan Lendl (United States) John McEnroe (Germany) Michael Stich (Israel) Amos Mansdorf
27 Jan	Davis Cup: first round Bayonne, France – carpet (i); The Hague, Netherlands – carpet (i); Rio de Janeiro, Brazil – clay Bolzano, Italy – carpet (i); Nicosia, Cyprus – carpet (i); Vancouver, British Columbia, Canada – carpet (i); Prague, Czechoslovakia – carpet (i); Mauna Lani, HI, United States – hard	First round winners France 5–0; Switzerland 4–1; Brazil 3–1; Italy 4–1; Australia 5–0; Sweden 3–2; Czechoslovakia 5–0; United States 5–0	First round losers Great Britain; Netherlands; Germany; Spain; Yugoslavia; Canada; Belgium; Argentina		

=== February ===
Week	Tournament	Champions	Runners-up	Semifinalists	Quarterfinalists
3 Feb	Muratti Time Indoor; Milan, Italy; ATP World Series; Carpet (i) – $565,000 – 32S/16D; Singles – Doubles	(Italy) Omar Camporese; 3–6, 6–3, 6–4	(Croatia) Goran Ivanišević	(Commonwealth of Independent States) Andrei Cherkasov (Italy) Stefano Pescosolido	(Spain) Javier Sánchez (Croatia) Goran Prpić (Italy) Gianluca Pozzi (United States) Patrick McEnroe
3 Feb	Muratti Time Indoor; Milan, Italy; ATP World Series; Carpet (i) – $565,000 – 32S/16D; Singles – Doubles	(United Kingdom) Neil Broad (Australia) David Macpherson; 5–7, 7–5, 6–4	(Spain) Sergio Casal (Spain) Emilio Sánchez	(Commonwealth of Independent States) Andrei Cherkasov (Italy) Stefano Pescosolido	(Spain) Javier Sánchez (Croatia) Goran Prpić (Italy) Gianluca Pozzi (United States) Patrick McEnroe
3 Feb	Volvo San Francisco; San Francisco, CA, USA; ATP World Series $225,000 – hard (i)– 32S/16D; Singles – Doubles	(United States) Michael Chang; 6–3, 6–3	(United States) Jim Courier	(United States) Derrick Rostagno (United States) Brad Gilbert	(Australia) Wally Masur (United States) Jeff Tarango (Germany) Karsten Braasch (France) Thierry Champion
3 Feb	Volvo San Francisco; San Francisco, CA, USA; ATP World Series $225,000 – hard (i)– 32S/16D; Singles – Doubles	(United States) Jim Grabb (United States) Richey Reneberg; 6–4, 7–5	(South Africa) Pieter Aldrich (South Africa) Danie Visser	(United States) Derrick Rostagno (United States) Brad Gilbert	(Australia) Wally Masur (United States) Jeff Tarango (Germany) Karsten Braasch (France) Thierry Champion
3 Feb	Maceió Open; Maceio, Brazil; ATP World Series; Clay – $130,000 – 32S/16D; Singles – Doubles	(Spain) Tomás Carbonell; 7–6^{(14–12)}, 5–7, 6–2	(Argentina) Christian Miniussi	(Spain) Francisco Roig (Brazil) Luiz Mattar	(Argentina) Martín Jaite (Argentina) Gabriel Markus (Brazil) Fernando Meligeni (Argentina) Franco Davín
3 Feb	Maceió Open; Maceio, Brazil; ATP World Series; Clay – $130,000 – 32S/16D; Singles – Doubles	(Argentina) Gabriel Markus (United States) John Sobel; 6–4, 1–6, 7–5	(Brazil) Ricardo Acioly (Brazil) Mauro Menezes	(Spain) Francisco Roig (Brazil) Luiz Mattar	(Argentina) Martín Jaite (Argentina) Gabriel Markus (Brazil) Fernando Meligeni (Argentina) Franco Davín
10 Feb	Donnay Indoor Championships; Brussels, Belgium; ATP Championship Series; Carpet (i) – $665,000 – 32S/16D; Singles – Doubles	(Germany) Boris Becker; 6–7^{(5–7)}, 2–6, 7–6^{(12–10)} 7–6^{(7–5)}, 7–5	(United States) Jim Courier	(Sweden) Stefan Edberg (France) Guy Forget	(Czechoslovakia) Karel Nováček (Germany) Carl-Uwe Steeb (Czechoslovakia) Ivan Lendl (Commonwealth of Independent States) Alexander Volkov
10 Feb	Donnay Indoor Championships; Brussels, Belgium; ATP Championship Series; Carpet (i) – $665,000 – 32S/16D; Singles – Doubles	(Germany) Boris Becker (United States) John McEnroe; 6–3, 6–2	(France) Guy Forget (Switzerland) Jakob Hlasek	(Sweden) Stefan Edberg (France) Guy Forget	(Czechoslovakia) Karel Nováček (Germany) Carl-Uwe Steeb (Czechoslovakia) Ivan Lendl (Commonwealth of Independent States) Alexander Volkov
10 Feb	Federal Express International; Memphis, Tennessee, USA; ATP Championship Series; Hard (i) – $630,000 – 48S/24D; Singles – Doubles	(United States) MaliVai Washington; 6–3, 6–2	(South Africa) Wayne Ferreira	(United States) Jimmy Connors (Israel) Amos Mansdorf	(United States) Aaron Krickstein (Netherlands) Michiel Schapers (Netherlands) Paul Haarhuis (United States) Pete Sampras
10 Feb	Federal Express International; Memphis, Tennessee, USA; ATP Championship Series; Hard (i) – $630,000 – 48S/24D; Singles – Doubles	(Australia) Todd Woodbridge (Australia) Mark Woodforde; 7–6, 6–1	(United States) Kevin Curren (South Africa) Gary Muller	(United States) Jimmy Connors (Israel) Amos Mansdorf	(United States) Aaron Krickstein (Netherlands) Michiel Schapers (Netherlands) Paul Haarhuis (United States) Pete Sampras
17 Feb	U.S. Pro Indoor; Philadelphia, PA, USA; ATP Championship Series; Carpet (i) – $865,000 – 48S/24D; Singles – Doubles	(United States) Pete Sampras; 6–1, 7–6^{(7–4)}, 2–6, 7–6^{(7–2)}	(Israel) Amos Mansdorf	(Spain) Francisco Clavet (United States) Brad Gilbert	(United States) Jeff Tarango (United States) Jim Grabb (Netherlands) Paul Haarhuis (United States) Aaron Krickstein
17 Feb	U.S. Pro Indoor; Philadelphia, PA, USA; ATP Championship Series; Carpet (i) – $865,000 – 48S/24D; Singles – Doubles	(Australia) Todd Woodbridge (Australia) Mark Woodforde; 7–5, 1–0 ret	(United States) Jim Grabb (United States) Richey Reneberg	(Spain) Francisco Clavet (United States) Brad Gilbert	(United States) Jeff Tarango (United States) Jim Grabb (Netherlands) Paul Haarhuis (United States) Aaron Krickstein
17 Feb	Eurocard Open; Stuttgart, Germany; ATP Championship Series; Carpet (i) – $865,000 – 32S/16D; Singles – Doubles	(Croatia) Goran Ivanišević; 6–7^{(5–7)}, 6–3, 6–4, 6–4	(Sweden) Stefan Edberg	(Commonwealth of Independent States) Alexander Volkov (Czechoslovakia) Petr Korda	(United States) Jim Courier (France) Guy Forget (Netherlands) Jan Siemerink (Italy) Omar Camporese
17 Feb	Eurocard Open; Stuttgart, Germany; ATP Championship Series; Carpet (i) – $865,000 – 32S/16D; Singles – Doubles	(Netherlands) Tom Nijssen (Czechoslovakia) Cyril Suk; 6–3, 6–7, 6–3	(Australia) John Fitzgerald (Sweden) Anders Järryd	(Commonwealth of Independent States) Alexander Volkov (Czechoslovakia) Petr Korda	(United States) Jim Courier (France) Guy Forget (Netherlands) Jan Siemerink (Italy) Omar Camporese
24 Feb	ABN AMRO World Tennis Tournament; Rotterdam, The Netherlands; ATP World Series; Carpet (i) – $475,000 – 32S/16D; Singles – Doubles	(Germany) Boris Becker; 7–6^{(11–9)}, 4–6, 6–2	(Commonwealth of Independent States) Alexander Volkov	(Netherlands) Paul Haarhuis (United States) John McEnroe	(Netherlands) Jan Siemerink (Croatia) Goran Prpić (Austria) Alex Antonitsch (United States) Patrick McEnroe
24 Feb	ABN AMRO World Tennis Tournament; Rotterdam, The Netherlands; ATP World Series; Carpet (i) – $475,000 – 32S/16D; Singles – Doubles	(Germany) Marc-Kevin Goellner (Germany) David Prinosil; 6–2, 6–7, 7–6	(Netherlands) Paul Haarhuis (Netherlands) Mark Koevermans	(Netherlands) Paul Haarhuis (United States) John McEnroe	(Netherlands) Jan Siemerink (Croatia) Goran Prpić (Austria) Alex Antonitsch (United States) Patrick McEnroe
24 Feb	Tennis Channel Open; Scottsdale, Arizona, USA; ATP World Series; Hard – $235,000 – 32S/16D; Singles – Doubles	(Italy) Stefano Pescosolido; 6–0, 1–6, 6–4	(United States) Brad Gilbert	(United States) MaliVai Washington (Commonwealth of Independent States) Andrei Chesnokov	(Spain) Emilio Sánchez (Argentina) Alberto Mancini (Italy) Cristiano Caratti (Switzerland) Marc Rosset
24 Feb	Tennis Channel Open; Scottsdale, Arizona, USA; ATP World Series; Hard – $235,000 – 32S/16D; Singles – Doubles	(United States) Mark Keil (United States) Dave Randall; 4–6, 6–1, 6–2	(United States) Kent Kinnear (United States) Sven Salumaa	(United States) MaliVai Washington (Commonwealth of Independent States) Andrei Chesnokov	(Spain) Emilio Sánchez (Argentina) Alberto Mancini (Italy) Cristiano Caratti (Switzerland) Marc Rosset

=== March ===
Week	Tournament	Champions	Runners-up	Semifinalists	Quarterfinalists
2 Mar	Indian Wells Masters; Indian Wells, California, USA; ATP Championship Series, Single Week; Hard – $825,000 – 56S/28D; Singles – Doubles	(United States) Michael Chang; 6–3, 6–4, 7–5	(Commonwealth of Independent States) Andrei Chesnokov	(Germany) Michael Stich (Spain) Francisco Clavet	(Spain) Emilio Sánchez (Spain) Sergi Bruguera (Commonwealth of Independent States) Andrei Cherkasov (Switzerland) Jakob Hlasek
2 Mar	Indian Wells Masters; Indian Wells, California, USA; ATP Championship Series, Single Week; Hard – $825,000 – 56S/28D; Singles – Doubles	(United States) Steve DeVries (Australia) David Macpherson; 6–3, 2–6, 6–4	(United States) Kent Kinnear (United States) Sven Salumaa	(Germany) Michael Stich (Spain) Francisco Clavet	(Spain) Emilio Sánchez (Spain) Sergi Bruguera (Commonwealth of Independent States) Andrei Cherkasov (Switzerland) Jakob Hlasek
2 Mar	Copenhagen Open; Copenhagen, Denmark; ATP World Series; Carpet (i) – $130,000 – 32S/16D; Singles – Doubles	(Sweden) Magnus Larsson; 6–4, 7–6^{(7–5)}	(Sweden) Anders Järryd	(Italy) Diego Nargiso (Germany) Christian Saceanu	(Denmark) Kenneth Carlsen (Netherlands) Jacco Eltingh (Sweden) Nicklas Kulti (Germany) Patrick Baur
2 Mar	Copenhagen Open; Copenhagen, Denmark; ATP World Series; Carpet (i) – $130,000 – 32S/16D; Singles – Doubles	(Sweden) Nicklas Kulti (Sweden) Magnus Larsson; 6–3, 6–4	(Netherlands) Hendrik Jan Davids (Belgium) Libor Pimek	(Italy) Diego Nargiso (Germany) Christian Saceanu	(Denmark) Kenneth Carlsen (Netherlands) Jacco Eltingh (Sweden) Nicklas Kulti (Germany) Patrick Baur
9 Mar; 16 Mar	Miami Masters; Key Biscayne, Florida, USA; ATP Championships Series, Single Week; Hard – $1,325,000 – 96S/48D; Singles – Doubles	(United States) Michael Chang; 7–5, 7–5	(Argentina) Alberto Mancini	(United States) Jim Courier (Switzerland) Jakob Hlasek	(Italy) Diego Nargiso (United States) Pete Sampras (Netherlands) Richard Krajicek (Commonwealth of Independent States) Andrei Cherkasov
9 Mar; 16 Mar	Miami Masters; Key Biscayne, Florida, USA; ATP Championships Series, Single Week; Hard – $1,325,000 – 96S/48D; Singles – Doubles	(United States) Ken Flach (United States) Todd Witsken; 7–6, 6–4	(United States) Kent Kinnear (United States) Sven Salumaa	(United States) Jim Courier (Switzerland) Jakob Hlasek	(Italy) Diego Nargiso (United States) Pete Sampras (Netherlands) Richard Krajicek (Commonwealth of Independent States) Andrei Cherkasov
16 Mar	Grand Prix Hassan II; Casablanca, Morocco; ATP World Series; Clay – $130,000 – 32S/16D; Singles – Doubles	(Argentina) Guillermo Pérez Roldán; 2–6, 7–5, 6–3	(Spain) Germán López	(Belgium) Bart Wuyts (Spain) Alberto Berasategui	(Morocco) Younes El Aynaoui (Uruguay) Marcelo Filippini (Netherlands) Mark Koevermans (Brazil) Luiz Mattar
16 Mar	Grand Prix Hassan II; Casablanca, Morocco; ATP World Series; Clay – $130,000 – 32S/16D; Singles – Doubles	(Argentina) Horacio de la Peña (Mexico) Jorge Lozano; 2–6, 6–4, 7–6	(Latvia) Ģirts Dzelde (United States) T. J. Middleton	(Belgium) Bart Wuyts (Spain) Alberto Berasategui	(Morocco) Younes El Aynaoui (Uruguay) Marcelo Filippini (Netherlands) Mark Koevermans (Brazil) Luiz Mattar
23 Mar	Davis Cup: Quarterfinals; Nîmes, France – clay (i); Maceió, Brazil – clay Lund, Sweden – carpet (i); Fort Myers, Florida, United States – hard	Quarterfinal winners Switzerland 3–1; Brazil 3–1; Sweden 5–0; United States 3–2	Quarterfinal losers France; Italy; Australia; Czechoslovakia		
30 Mar	Estoril Open; Oeiras, Portugal; ATP World Series; Clay – $465,000 – 32S/16D; Singles – Doubles	(Spain) Carlos Costa; 4–6, 6–2, 6–2	(Spain) Sergi Bruguera	(Spain) Jordi Arrese (Spain) Emilio Sánchez	(Czechoslovakia) Ivan Lendl (Portugal) João Cunha-Silva (Argentina) Horacio de la Peña (France) Frédéric Fontang
30 Mar	Estoril Open; Oeiras, Portugal; ATP World Series; Clay – $465,000 – 32S/16D; Singles – Doubles	(Netherlands) Hendrik Jan Davids (Belgium) Libor Pimek; 3–6, 6–3, 7–5	(United States) Luke Jensen (Australia) Laurie Warder	(Spain) Jordi Arrese (Spain) Emilio Sánchez	(Czechoslovakia) Ivan Lendl (Portugal) João Cunha-Silva (Argentina) Horacio de la Peña (France) Frédéric Fontang
30 Mar	South African Open; Johannesburg, South Africa; ATP World Series; Hard – $270,000 – 32S/16D; Singles – Doubles	(United States) Aaron Krickstein; 6–4, 6–4	(Commonwealth of Independent States) Alexander Volkov	(South Africa) Wayne Ferreira (Canada) Chris Pridham	(Australia) Carl Limberger (Belgium) Xavier Daufresne (South Africa) Gary Muller (Zimbabwe) Kevin Ullyett
30 Mar	South African Open; Johannesburg, South Africa; ATP World Series; Hard – $270,000 – 32S/16D; Singles – Doubles	(South Africa) Pieter Aldrich (South Africa) Danie Visser; 6–4, 6–4	(South Africa) Wayne Ferreira (South Africa) Piet Norval	(South Africa) Wayne Ferreira (Canada) Chris Pridham	(Australia) Carl Limberger (Belgium) Xavier Daufresne (South Africa) Gary Muller (Zimbabwe) Kevin Ullyett
30 Mar	Epson Singapore Super Tennis; Singapore, Singapore; ATP World Series; Hard – $240,000 – 32S/16D	(Australia) Simon Youl; 6–4, 6–1	(Netherlands) Paul Haarhuis	(India) Ramesh Krishnan (Germany) Alexander Mronz	(Australia) Mark Woodforde (Denmark) Kenneth Carlsen (United States) Jim Grabb (Australia) John Fitzgerald
30 Mar	Epson Singapore Super Tennis; Singapore, Singapore; ATP World Series; Hard – $240,000 – 32S/16D	(Australia) Todd Woodbridge (Australia) Mark Woodforde; 6–7, 6–2, 6–4	(Canada) Grant Connell (Canada) Glenn Michibata	(India) Ramesh Krishnan (Germany) Alexander Mronz	(Australia) Mark Woodforde (Denmark) Kenneth Carlsen (United States) Jim Grabb (Australia) John Fitzgerald

=== April ===
Week	Tournament	Champions	Runners-up	Semifinalists	Quarterfinalists
6 Apr	Japan Open Tennis Championships; Tokyo, Japan; ATP Championship Series; Hard – $865,000 – 56S/28D; Singles – Doubles	(United States) Jim Courier; 6–4, 6–4, 7–6^{(7–3)}	(Netherlands) Richard Krajicek	(Sweden) Stefan Edberg (United States) Michael Chang	(United States) Brad Gilbert (Germany) Michael Stich (Australia) Todd Woodbridge (Israel) Amos Mansdorf
6 Apr	Japan Open Tennis Championships; Tokyo, Japan; ATP Championship Series; Hard – $865,000 – 56S/28D; Singles – Doubles	(United States) Kelly Jones (United States) Rick Leach; 6–1, 6–7, 6–4	(Australia) John Fitzgerald (Sweden) Anders Järryd	(Sweden) Stefan Edberg (United States) Michael Chang	(United States) Brad Gilbert (Germany) Michael Stich (Australia) Todd Woodbridge (Israel) Amos Mansdorf
6 Apr	Torneo Godó; Barcelona, Spain; ATP Championship Series; Clay – $660,000 – 56S/28D; Singles – Doubles	(Spain) Carlos Costa; 6–4, 7–6^{(7–3)}, 6–4	(Sweden) Magnus Gustafsson	(Spain) Sergi Bruguera (Argentina) Alberto Mancini	(Austria) Horst Skoff (Sweden) Jonas Svensson (France) Rodolphe Gilbert (Czechoslovakia) Ivan Lendl
6 Apr	Torneo Godó; Barcelona, Spain; ATP Championship Series; Clay – $660,000 – 56S/28D; Singles – Doubles	(Ecuador) Andrés Gómez (Spain) Javier Sánchez; 6–3, 6–1	(Czechoslovakia) Ivan Lendl (Czechoslovakia) Karel Nováček	(Spain) Sergi Bruguera (Argentina) Alberto Mancini	(Austria) Horst Skoff (Sweden) Jonas Svensson (France) Rodolphe Gilbert (Czechoslovakia) Ivan Lendl
13 Apr	Salem Open; Hong Kong; ATP World Series; Hard – $270,000 – 32S/16D; Singles – Doubles	(United States) Jim Courier; 7–5, 6–3	(United States) Michael Chang	(United States) Brad Gilbert (Australia) Todd Woodbridge	(South Africa) Gary Muller (Japan) Shuzo Matsuoka (Netherlands) Jan Siemerink (United States) Kevin Curren
13 Apr	Salem Open; Hong Kong; ATP World Series; Hard – $270,000 – 32S/16D; Singles – Doubles	(United States) Brad Gilbert (United States) Jim Grabb; 6–2, 6–1	(Zimbabwe) Byron Black (South Africa) Byron Talbot	(United States) Brad Gilbert (Australia) Todd Woodbridge	(South Africa) Gary Muller (Japan) Shuzo Matsuoka (Netherlands) Jan Siemerink (United States) Kevin Curren
13 Apr	Philips Open; Nice, France; ATP World Series; Clay – $235,000 – 32S/16D; Singles – Doubles	(Argentina) Gabriel Markus; 6–4, 6–4	(Spain) Javier Sánchez	(United States) Pete Sampras (France) Fabrice Santoro	(France) Henri Leconte (France) Thierry Champion (Sweden) Magnus Larsson (France) Guy Forget
13 Apr	Philips Open; Nice, France; ATP World Series; Clay – $235,000 – 32S/16D; Singles – Doubles	(United States) Patrick Galbraith (United States) Scott Melville; 6–1, 3–6, 6–4	(South Africa) Pieter Aldrich (South Africa) Danie Visser	(United States) Pete Sampras (France) Fabrice Santoro	(France) Henri Leconte (France) Thierry Champion (Sweden) Magnus Larsson (France) Guy Forget
13 Apr	Tampa Open; Tampa, FL, USA; ATP World Series; Clay – $235,000 – 32S/16D	(Peru) Jaime Yzaga; 3–6, 6–4, 6–1	(United States) MaliVai Washington	(Switzerland) Claudio Mezzadri (Argentina) Franco Davín	(Spain) Marcos Aurelio Górriz (Australia) Mark Woodforde (Uruguay) Marcelo Filippini (United States) Andre Agassi
13 Apr	Tampa Open; Tampa, FL, USA; ATP World Series; Clay – $235,000 – 32S/16D	(United States) Mike Briggs (United States) Trevor Kronemann; 7–6, 6–7, 6–4	(Brazil) Luiz Mattar (Commonwealth of Independent States) Andrei Olhovskiy	(Switzerland) Claudio Mezzadri (Argentina) Franco Davín	(Spain) Marcos Aurelio Górriz (Australia) Mark Woodforde (Uruguay) Marcelo Filippini (United States) Andre Agassi
20 Apr	Monte Carlo Open; Roquebrune-Cap-Martin, France; ATP Championship Series, Single Week; Clay – $1,020,000 – 56S/28D; Singles – Doubles	(Austria) Thomas Muster; 6–3, 6–1, 6–3	(United States) Aaron Krickstein	(Croatia) Goran Prpić (France) Arnaud Boetsch	(Commonwealth of Independent States) Andrei Chesnokov (Germany) Michael Stich (Sweden) Mikael Tillström (Germany) Carl-Uwe Steeb
20 Apr	Monte Carlo Open; Roquebrune-Cap-Martin, France; ATP Championship Series, Single Week; Clay – $1,020,000 – 56S/28D; Singles – Doubles	(Germany) Boris Becker (Germany) Michael Stich; 3–6, 6–1, 6–4	(Czechoslovakia) Petr Korda (Czechoslovakia) Karel Nováček	(Croatia) Goran Prpić (France) Arnaud Boetsch	(Commonwealth of Independent States) Andrei Chesnokov (Germany) Michael Stich (Sweden) Mikael Tillström (Germany) Carl-Uwe Steeb
20 Apr	Seoul Open; Seoul, South Korea; ATP World Series; Hard – $145,000 – 32S/16D; Singles – Doubles	(Japan) Shuzo Matsuoka; 6–3, 4–6, 7–5	(Australia) Todd Woodbridge	(Italy) Gianluca Pozzi (Germany) Patrik Kühnen	(Australia) John Fitzgerald (France) Guillaume Raoux (Germany) Alexander Mronz (South Africa) Gary Muller
20 Apr	Seoul Open; Seoul, South Korea; ATP World Series; Hard – $145,000 – 32S/16D; Singles – Doubles	(United States) Kevin Curren (South Africa) Gary Muller; 7–6, 6–4	(New Zealand) Kelly Evernden (United States) Brad Pearce	(Italy) Gianluca Pozzi (Germany) Patrik Kühnen	(Australia) John Fitzgerald (France) Guillaume Raoux (Germany) Alexander Mronz (South Africa) Gary Muller
27 Apr	Trofeo Villa de Madrid; Madrid, Spain; ATP World Series; Clay – $700,000 – 32S/16D; Singles – Doubles	(Spain) Sergi Bruguera; 7–6^{(8–6)}, 6–2, 6–2	(Spain) Carlos Costa	(Spain) Francisco Clavet (Spain) Javier Sánchez	(France) Arnaud Boetsch (Argentina) Alberto Mancini (Switzerland) Marc Rosset (Spain) Jordi Arrese
27 Apr	Trofeo Villa de Madrid; Madrid, Spain; ATP World Series; Clay – $700,000 – 32S/16D; Singles – Doubles	(United States) Patrick Galbraith (United States) Patrick McEnroe; 6–3, 6–2	(Spain) Francisco Clavet (Spain) Carlos Costa	(Spain) Francisco Clavet (Spain) Javier Sánchez	(France) Arnaud Boetsch (Argentina) Alberto Mancini (Switzerland) Marc Rosset (Spain) Jordi Arrese
27 Apr	BMW Open; Munich, Germany; ATP World Series; Clay – $275,000 – 32S/16D; Singles – Doubles	(Sweden) Magnus Larsson; 6–4, 4–6, 6–1	(Czechoslovakia) Petr Korda	(Germany) Markus Naewie (Germany) Bernd Karbacher	(Germany) Michael Stich (Commonwealth of Independent States) Andrei Medvedev (Czechoslovakia) Karel Nováček (Sweden) Nicklas Kulti
27 Apr	BMW Open; Munich, Germany; ATP World Series; Clay – $275,000 – 32S/16D; Singles – Doubles	(South Africa) David Adams (Netherlands) Menno Oosting; 3–6, 7–5, 6–3	(Czechoslovakia) Tomáš Anzari (Australia) Carl Limberger	(Germany) Markus Naewie (Germany) Bernd Karbacher	(Germany) Michael Stich (Commonwealth of Independent States) Andrei Medvedev (Czechoslovakia) Karel Nováček (Sweden) Nicklas Kulti
27 Apr	AT&T Challenge; Atlanta, GA, USA; ATP World Series; Clay – $235,000 – 32S/16D; Singles – Doubles	(United States) Andre Agassi; 7–5, 6–4	(United States) Pete Sampras	(United States) Todd Witsken (Peru) Pablo Arraya	(United States) Jimmy Connors (Spain) Francisco Roig (Commonwealth of Independent States) Alexander Volkov (Netherlands) Jacco Eltingh
27 Apr	AT&T Challenge; Atlanta, GA, USA; ATP World Series; Clay – $235,000 – 32S/16D; Singles – Doubles	(United States) Steve DeVries (Australia) David Macpherson; 6–3, 6–3	(United States) Mark Keil (United States) Dave Randall	(United States) Todd Witsken (Peru) Pablo Arraya	(United States) Jimmy Connors (Spain) Francisco Roig (Commonwealth of Independent States) Alexander Volkov (Netherlands) Jacco Eltingh

=== May ===
Week	Tournament	Champions	Runners-up	Semifinalists	Quarterfinalists
4 May	ATP German Open; Hamburg, Germany; ATP Championship Series, Single Week; Clay – $1,000,000 – 56S/28D; Singles – Doubles	(Sweden) Stefan Edberg; 5–7, 6–4, 6–1	(Germany) Michael Stich	(Spain) Carlos Costa (Germany) Boris Becker	(Italy) Omar Camporese (Netherlands) Paul Haarhuis (Netherlands) Richard Krajicek (Czechoslovakia) Karel Nováček
4 May	ATP German Open; Hamburg, Germany; ATP Championship Series, Single Week; Clay – $1,000,000 – 56S/28D; Singles – Doubles	(Spain) Sergio Casal (Spain) Emilio Sánchez; 6–3, 3–6, 6–4	(Germany) Carl-Uwe Steeb (Germany) Michael Stich	(Spain) Carlos Costa (Germany) Boris Becker	(Italy) Omar Camporese (Netherlands) Paul Haarhuis (Netherlands) Richard Krajicek (Czechoslovakia) Karel Nováček
4 May	U.S. Men's Clay Court Championships; Charlotte, NC, US; ATP World Series; Clay – $225,000 – 32S/16D; Singles – Doubles	(United States) MaliVai Washington; 6–3, 6–3	(Switzerland) Claudio Mezzadri	(United States) Jeff Tarango (Brazil) Luiz Mattar	(United States) Aaron Krickstein (Argentina) Franco Davín (Australia) Richard Fromberg (Australia) Mark Woodforde
4 May	U.S. Men's Clay Court Championships; Charlotte, NC, US; ATP World Series; Clay – $225,000 – 32S/16D; Singles – Doubles	(United States) Steve DeVries (Australia) David Macpherson; 6–4 7–6	(United States) Bret Garnett (United States) Jared Palmer	(United States) Jeff Tarango (Brazil) Luiz Mattar	(United States) Aaron Krickstein (Argentina) Franco Davín (Australia) Richard Fromberg (Australia) Mark Woodforde
11 May	Italian Open; Rome, Italy; ATP Championship Series, Single Week; Clay – $1,125,000 – 64S/32D; Singles – Doubles	(United States) Jim Courier; 7–6^{(7–3)}, 6–0, 6–4	(Spain) Carlos Costa	(Germany) Carl-Uwe Steeb (Czechoslovakia) Petr Korda	(Argentina) Christian Miniussi (United States) Michael Chang (Peru) Jaime Yzaga (United States) Pete Sampras
11 May	Italian Open; Rome, Italy; ATP Championship Series, Single Week; Clay – $1,125,000 – 64S/32D; Singles – Doubles	(Switzerland) Jakob Hlasek (Switzerland) Marc Rosset; 6–4, 3–6, 6–1	(South Africa) Wayne Ferreira (Australia) Mark Kratzmann	(Germany) Carl-Uwe Steeb (Czechoslovakia) Petr Korda	(Argentina) Christian Miniussi (United States) Michael Chang (Peru) Jaime Yzaga (United States) Pete Sampras
18 May	Bologna Outdoor; Bologna, Italy; ATP World Series; Clay – $240,000 – 32S/16D	(Brazil) Jaime Oncins; 6–2, 6–4	(Italy) Renzo Furlan	(Ecuador) Andrés Gómez (Belgium) Bart Wuyts	(Germany) Lars Koslowski (Italy) Claudio Pistolesi (Argentina) Franco Davín (Czechoslovakia) Slava Doseděl
18 May	Bologna Outdoor; Bologna, Italy; ATP World Series; Clay – $240,000 – 32S/16D	(United States) Luke Jensen (Australia) Laurie Warder; 6–2, 6–3	(Argentina) Javier Frana (Spain) Javier Sánchez	(Ecuador) Andrés Gómez (Belgium) Bart Wuyts	(Germany) Lars Koslowski (Italy) Claudio Pistolesi (Argentina) Franco Davín (Czechoslovakia) Slava Doseděl
25 May; 1 Jun	French Open; Paris, France; Grand Slam; Clay – $3,797,528 – 128S/64D/48XD; Singles – Doubles – Mixed doubles	(United States) Jim Courier; 7–5, 6–2, 6–1	(Czechoslovakia) Petr Korda	(United States) Andre Agassi (France) Henri Leconte	(Croatia) Goran Ivanišević (United States) Pete Sampras (Sweden) Nicklas Kulti (Commonwealth of Independent States) Andrei Cherkasov
25 May; 1 Jun	French Open; Paris, France; Grand Slam; Clay – $3,797,528 – 128S/64D/48XD; Singles – Doubles – Mixed doubles	(Switzerland) Jakob Hlasek (Switzerland) Marc Rosset; 7–6, 6–7, 7–5	(South Africa) David Adams (Commonwealth of Independent States) Andrei Olhovskiy	(United States) Andre Agassi (France) Henri Leconte	(Croatia) Goran Ivanišević (United States) Pete Sampras (Sweden) Nicklas Kulti (Commonwealth of Independent States) Andrei Cherkasov
25 May; 1 Jun	French Open; Paris, France; Grand Slam; Clay – $3,797,528 – 128S/64D/48XD; Singles – Doubles – Mixed doubles	(Spain) Arantxa Sánchez Vicario (Australia) Todd Woodbridge; 6–2, 6–3	(United States) Lori McNeil (United States) Bryan Shelton	(United States) Andre Agassi (France) Henri Leconte	(Croatia) Goran Ivanišević (United States) Pete Sampras (Sweden) Nicklas Kulti (Commonwealth of Independent States) Andrei Cherkasov

=== June ===
Week	Tournament	Champions	Runners-up	Semifinalists	Quarterfinalists
8 Jun	Stella Artois Championships; London, England; ATP World Series; Grass – $475,000 – 56S/28D; Singles – Doubles	(South Africa) Wayne Ferreira; 6–3, 6–4	(Japan) Shuzo Matsuoka	(Sweden) Stefan Edberg (United States) Brad Gilbert	(Australia) Pat Cash (France) Guillaume Raoux (Australia) Jason Stoltenberg (United States) Pete Sampras
8 Jun	Stella Artois Championships; London, England; ATP World Series; Grass – $475,000 – 56S/28D; Singles – Doubles	(Australia) John Fitzgerald (Sweden) Anders Järryd; 7–6, 2–6, 16–14	(Croatia) Goran Ivanišević (Italy) Diego Nargiso	(Sweden) Stefan Edberg (United States) Brad Gilbert	(Australia) Pat Cash (France) Guillaume Raoux (Australia) Jason Stoltenberg (United States) Pete Sampras
8 Jun	Trofeo Kim Top Line; Florence, Italy; ATP World Series; Clay – $235,000 – 32S/16D; Singles – Doubles	(Austria) Thomas Muster; 6–3, 1–6, 6–1	(Italy) Renzo Furlan	(Sweden) Magnus Gustafsson (Uruguay) Marcelo Filippini	(Brazil) Luiz Mattar (Argentina) Francisco Yunis (Argentina) Franco Davín (France) Fabrice Santoro
8 Jun	Trofeo Kim Top Line; Florence, Italy; ATP World Series; Clay – $235,000 – 32S/16D; Singles – Doubles	(Uruguay) Marcelo Filippini (Brazil) Luiz Mattar; 6–4, 6–7, 6–4	(South Africa) Royce Deppe (South Africa) Brent Haygarth	(Sweden) Magnus Gustafsson (Uruguay) Marcelo Filippini	(Brazil) Luiz Mattar (Argentina) Francisco Yunis (Argentina) Franco Davín (France) Fabrice Santoro
8 Jun	Rosmalen Grass Court Championships; Rosmalen, The Netherlands; ATP World Series; Grass – $235,000 – 32S/16D; Singles – Doubles	(Germany) Michael Stich; 6–4, 7–5	(United States) Jonathan Stark	(United States) John McEnroe (Netherlands) Michiel Schapers	(United States) Richey Reneberg (Commonwealth of Independent States) Alexander Volkov (Sweden) Henrik Holm (Netherlands) Richard Krajicek
8 Jun	Rosmalen Grass Court Championships; Rosmalen, The Netherlands; ATP World Series; Grass – $235,000 – 32S/16D; Singles – Doubles	(United States) Jim Grabb (United States) Richey Reneberg; 6–4, 6–7, 6–4	(United States) John McEnroe (Germany) Michael Stich	(United States) John McEnroe (Netherlands) Michiel Schapers	(United States) Richey Reneberg (Commonwealth of Independent States) Alexander Volkov (Sweden) Henrik Holm (Netherlands) Richard Krajicek
15 Jun	ATP Genova; Genova, Italy; ATP World Series; Clay – $235,000 – 32S/16D	(Commonwealth of Independent States) Andrei Medvedev; 6–3, 6–4	(Argentina) Guillermo Pérez Roldán	(Uruguay) Marcelo Filippini (Austria) Horst Skoff	(Brazil) Jaime Oncins (Sweden) Magnus Gustafsson (Spain) Marcos Aurelio Górriz (Italy) Paolo Canè
15 Jun	ATP Genova; Genova, Italy; ATP World Series; Clay – $235,000 – 32S/16D	(United States) Shelby Cannon (United States) Greg Van Emburgh; 6–1, 6–1	(Netherlands) Paul Haarhuis (Netherlands) Mark Koevermans	(Uruguay) Marcelo Filippini (Austria) Horst Skoff	(Brazil) Jaime Oncins (Sweden) Magnus Gustafsson (Spain) Marcos Aurelio Górriz (Italy) Paolo Canè
15 Jun	Manchester Open; Manchester, England; ATP World Series; Grass – $235,000 – 32S/16D; Singles – Doubles	(Netherlands) Jacco Eltingh; 6–3, 6–4	(United States) MaliVai Washington	(Australia) Wally Masur (Mexico) Luis Herrera	(United States) Jeff Tarango (Germany) Arne Thoms (Australia) Simon Youl (United States) Brad Gilbert
15 Jun	Manchester Open; Manchester, England; ATP World Series; Grass – $235,000 – 32S/16D; Singles – Doubles	(United States) Patrick Galbraith (Australia) David Macpherson; 4–6, 6–3, 6–2	(United Kingdom) Jeremy Bates (Australia) Laurie Warder	(Australia) Wally Masur (Mexico) Luis Herrera	(United States) Jeff Tarango (Germany) Arne Thoms (Australia) Simon Youl (United States) Brad Gilbert
22 Jun; 29 Jun	Wimbledon Championships; London, England; Grand Slam; Grass – $3,654,296 – 128S/64D/64XD; Singles – Doubles – Mixed doubles	(United States) Andre Agassi; 6–7^{(8–10)}, 6–4, 6–4, 1–6, 6–4	(Croatia) Goran Ivanišević	(United States) John McEnroe (United States) Pete Sampras	(France) Guy Forget (Germany) Boris Becker (Germany) Michael Stich (Sweden) Stefan Edberg
22 Jun; 29 Jun	Wimbledon Championships; London, England; Grand Slam; Grass – $3,654,296 – 128S/64D/64XD; Singles – Doubles – Mixed doubles	(United States) John McEnroe (Germany) Michael Stich; 5–7, 7–6, 3–6, 7–6, 19–17	(United States) Jim Grabb (United States) Richey Reneberg	(United States) John McEnroe (United States) Pete Sampras	(France) Guy Forget (Germany) Boris Becker (Germany) Michael Stich (Sweden) Stefan Edberg
22 Jun; 29 Jun	Wimbledon Championships; London, England; Grand Slam; Grass – $3,654,296 – 128S/64D/64XD; Singles – Doubles – Mixed doubles	(Belarus) Larisa Neiland (Czechoslovakia) Cyril Suk; 7–6^{(7–2)}, 6–2	(Netherlands) Miriam Oremans (Netherlands) Jacco Eltingh	(United States) John McEnroe (United States) Pete Sampras	(France) Guy Forget (Germany) Boris Becker (Germany) Michael Stich (Sweden) Stefan Edberg

=== July ===
Week	Tournament	Champions	Runners-up	Semifinalists	Quarterfinalists
6 Jul	Rado Swiss Open; Gstaad, Switzerland; ATP World Series; Clay – $300,000 – 32S/16D	(Spain) Sergi Bruguera; 6–1, 6–4	(Spain) Francisco Clavet	(France) Fabrice Santoro (Argentina) Gabriel Markus	(Czechoslovakia) Karel Nováček (Spain) Emilio Sánchez (Croatia) Goran Ivanišević (United States) Michael Chang
6 Jul	Rado Swiss Open; Gstaad, Switzerland; ATP World Series; Clay – $300,000 – 32S/16D	(Netherlands) Hendrik Jan Davids (Belgium) Libor Pimek; W/O	(Czechoslovakia) Petr Korda (Czechoslovakia) Cyril Suk	(France) Fabrice Santoro (Argentina) Gabriel Markus	(Czechoslovakia) Karel Nováček (Spain) Emilio Sánchez (Croatia) Goran Ivanišević (United States) Michael Chang
6 Jul	Swedish Open; Båstad, Sweden; ATP World Series $235,000 − Clay − 32S/16D; Singles – Doubles	(Sweden) Magnus Gustafsson; 5–7, 7–5, 6–4	(Spain) Tomás Carbonell	(Argentina) Guillermo Pérez Roldán (Spain) Jordi Arrese	(France) Arnaud Boetsch (Sweden) Magnus Larsson (Sweden) Christian Bergström (Sweden) Thomas Enqvist
6 Jul	Swedish Open; Båstad, Sweden; ATP World Series $235,000 − Clay − 32S/16D; Singles – Doubles	(Spain) Tomás Carbonell (Argentina) Christian Miniussi; 6–4, 7–5	(Sweden) Christian Bergström (Sweden) Magnus Gustafsson	(Argentina) Guillermo Pérez Roldán (Spain) Jordi Arrese	(France) Arnaud Boetsch (Sweden) Magnus Larsson (Sweden) Christian Bergström (Sweden) Thomas Enqvist
6 Jul	Miller Lite Hall of Fame Championships; Newport, Rhode Island, USA; ATP World Series; Grass – $175,000 – 32S/16D	(United States) Bryan Shelton; 6–4, 6–4	(Austria) Alex Antonitsch	(Australia) Neil Borwick (Argentina) Javier Frana	(United States) Brian MacPhie (South Africa) Christo van Rensburg (United States) Jonathan Stark (Australia) Sandon Stolle
6 Jul	Miller Lite Hall of Fame Championships; Newport, Rhode Island, USA; ATP World Series; Grass – $175,000 – 32S/16D	(South Africa) Royce Deppe (Czechoslovakia) David Rikl; 6–4, 6–4	(United States) Paul Annacone (United States) David Wheaton	(Australia) Neil Borwick (Argentina) Javier Frana	(United States) Brian MacPhie (South Africa) Christo van Rensburg (United States) Jonathan Stark (Australia) Sandon Stolle
13 Jul	Mercedes Cup; Stuttgart, Germany; ATP Championship Series; Clay – $865,000 – 48S/24D; Singles – Doubles	(Commonwealth of Independent States) Andrei Medvedev; 6–1, 6–4, 6–7^{(5–7)}, 2–6, 6–1	(South Africa) Wayne Ferreira	(Austria) Thomas Muster (Czechoslovakia) Karel Nováček	(Sweden) Stefan Edberg (Germany) Bernd Karbacher (Spain) Carlos Costa (Croatia) Goran Ivanišević
13 Jul	Mercedes Cup; Stuttgart, Germany; ATP Championship Series; Clay – $865,000 – 48S/24D; Singles – Doubles	(United States) Glenn Layendecker (South Africa) Byron Talbot; 6–3, 7–6	(Switzerland) Marc Rosset (Spain) Javier Sánchez	(Austria) Thomas Muster (Czechoslovakia) Karel Nováček	(Sweden) Stefan Edberg (Germany) Bernd Karbacher (Spain) Carlos Costa (Croatia) Goran Ivanišević
13 Jul	NationsBank Classic; Washington, D.C., USA; ATP Championship Series; Hard – $490,000 – 56S/28D; Singles – Doubles	(Czechoslovakia) Petr Korda; 6–4, 6–4	(Sweden) Henrik Holm	(United States) MaliVai Washington (United States) Derrick Rostagno	(Israel) Amos Mansdorf (France) Guillaume Raoux (United States) Ivan Lendl (South Africa) Gary Muller
13 Jul	NationsBank Classic; Washington, D.C., USA; ATP Championship Series; Hard – $490,000 – 56S/28D; Singles – Doubles	(United States) Bret Garnett (United States) Jared Palmer; 6–2, 6–3	(United States) Ken Flach (United States) Todd Witsken	(United States) MaliVai Washington (United States) Derrick Rostagno	(Israel) Amos Mansdorf (France) Guillaume Raoux (United States) Ivan Lendl (South Africa) Gary Muller
20 Jul	Canadian Open; Toronto, Ontario, Canada; ATP Championship Series, Single Week; Hard – $1,025,000 – 56S/28D; Singles – Doubles	(United States) Andre Agassi; 3–6, 6–2, 6–0	(United States) Ivan Lendl	(Australia) Wally Masur (United States) MaliVai Washington	(Czechoslovakia) Petr Korda (United States) John McEnroe (United States) Aaron Krickstein (Israel) Amos Mansdorf
20 Jul	Canadian Open; Toronto, Ontario, Canada; ATP Championship Series, Single Week; Hard – $1,025,000 – 56S/28D; Singles – Doubles	(United States) Patrick Galbraith (South Africa) Danie Visser; 7–5, 6–4	(United States) Andre Agassi (United States) John McEnroe	(Australia) Wally Masur (United States) MaliVai Washington	(Czechoslovakia) Petr Korda (United States) John McEnroe (United States) Aaron Krickstein (Israel) Amos Mansdorf
20 Jul	Philips Head Cup; Kitzbühel, Austria; ATP World Series; Clay – $355,000 – 48S/24D; Singles – Doubles	(United States) Pete Sampras; 6–3, 7–5, 6–3	(Argentina) Alberto Mancini	(Austria) Thomas Muster (Uruguay) Marcelo Filippini	(Uruguay) Diego Pérez (Czechoslovakia) Martin Střelba (Spain) Emilio Sánchez (Argentina) Gabriel Markus
20 Jul	Philips Head Cup; Kitzbühel, Austria; ATP World Series; Clay – $355,000 – 48S/24D; Singles – Doubles	(Spain) Sergio Casal (Spain) Emilio Sánchez; 6–7, 7–5, 6–3	(Argentina) Horacio de la Peña (Czechoslovakia) Vojtěch Flégl	(Austria) Thomas Muster (Uruguay) Marcelo Filippini	(Uruguay) Diego Pérez (Czechoslovakia) Martin Střelba (Spain) Emilio Sánchez (Argentina) Gabriel Markus
20 Jul	Dutch Open; Hilversum, The Netherlands; ATP World Series; Clay – $225,000 – 32S/16D; Singles – Doubles	(Czechoslovakia) Karel Nováček; 6–2, 6–3, 2–6, 7–5	(Spain) Jordi Arrese	(France) Fabrice Santoro (Sweden) Mikael Tillström	(Netherlands) Jan Siemerink (Netherlands) Jacco Eltingh (Netherlands) Mark Koevermans (Belgium) Bart Wuyts
20 Jul	Dutch Open; Hilversum, The Netherlands; ATP World Series; Clay – $225,000 – 32S/16D; Singles – Doubles	(Netherlands) Paul Haarhuis (Netherlands) Mark Koevermans; 6–7, 6–1, 6–4	(Sweden) Mårten Renström (Sweden) Mikael Tillström	(France) Fabrice Santoro (Sweden) Mikael Tillström	(Netherlands) Jan Siemerink (Netherlands) Jacco Eltingh (Netherlands) Mark Koevermans (Belgium) Bart Wuyts
27 Jul	Summer Olympic Games; Barcelona, Spain; Olympic Games; Clay – 64S/32D; Singles – Doubles	(Switzerland) Marc Rosset; 7–6^{(7–2)}, 6–4, 3–6, 4–6, 8–6	(Spain) Jordi Arrese	(Croatia) Goran Ivanišević (Commonwealth of Independent States) Andrei Cherkasov	(Spain) Emilio Sánchez (France) Fabrice Santoro (Brazil) Jaime Oncins (Mexico) Leonardo Lavalle
27 Jul	Summer Olympic Games; Barcelona, Spain; Olympic Games; Clay – 64S/32D; Singles – Doubles	(Germany) Boris Becker (Germany) Michael Stich; 7–6, 4–6, 7–6, 6–3	(South Africa) Wayne Ferreira (South Africa) Piet Norval	(Croatia) Goran Ivanišević (Commonwealth of Independent States) Andrei Cherkasov	(Spain) Emilio Sánchez (France) Fabrice Santoro (Brazil) Jaime Oncins (Mexico) Leonardo Lavalle
27 Jul	Internazionali di Tennis di San Marino; San Marino, San Marino; ATP World Series; Clay – $235,000 – 32S/16D; Singles – Doubles	(Czechoslovakia) Karel Nováček; 7–5, 6–2	(Spain) Francisco Clavet	(Sweden) Lars Jönsson (Haiti) Ronald Agénor	(Belgium) Bart Wuyts (Spain) Germán López (United States) Francisco Montana (Sweden) Mikael Tillström
27 Jul	Internazionali di Tennis di San Marino; San Marino, San Marino; ATP World Series; Clay – $235,000 – 32S/16D; Singles – Doubles	(Sweden) Nicklas Kulti (Sweden) Mikael Tillström; 6–2, 6–2	(Italy) Cristian Brandi (Italy) Federico Mordegan	(Sweden) Lars Jönsson (Haiti) Ronald Agénor	(Belgium) Bart Wuyts (Spain) Germán López (United States) Francisco Montana (Sweden) Mikael Tillström

=== August ===
Week	Tournament	Champions	Runners-up	Semifinalists	Quarterfinalists
3 Aug	Volvo Tennis/Los Angeles; Los Angeles, CA, US; ATP World Series; Hard – $235,000 – 32S/16D; Singles – Doubles	(Netherlands) Richard Krajicek; 6–4, 2–6, 6–4	(Australia) Mark Woodforde	(United States) Aaron Krickstein (Australia) Sandon Stolle	(Italy) Gianluca Pozzi (United States) Jimmy Connors (United States) Richey Reneberg (United States) Jeff Tarango
3 Aug	Volvo Tennis/Los Angeles; Los Angeles, CA, US; ATP World Series; Hard – $235,000 – 32S/16D; Singles – Doubles	(United States) Patrick Galbraith (United States) Jim Pugh; 7–6, 7–6	(United States) Francisco Montana (United States) David Wheaton	(United States) Aaron Krickstein (Australia) Sandon Stolle	(Italy) Gianluca Pozzi (United States) Jimmy Connors (United States) Richey Reneberg (United States) Jeff Tarango
10 Aug	Thriftway ATP Championships; Mason, Ohio, USA; ATP Championship Series, Single Week; Hard – $1,125,000 – 56S/28D; Singles – Doubles	(United States) Pete Sampras; 6–3, 3–6, 6–3	(United States) Ivan Lendl	(United States) Michael Chang (Sweden) Stefan Edberg	(United States) David Wheaton (Peru) Jaime Yzaga (Czechoslovakia) Petr Korda (United States) Jim Grabb
10 Aug	Thriftway ATP Championships; Mason, Ohio, USA; ATP Championship Series, Single Week; Hard – $1,125,000 – 56S/28D; Singles – Doubles	(Australia) Todd Woodbridge (Australia) Mark Woodforde; 7–6, 6–4	(United States) Patrick McEnroe (United States) Jonathan Stark	(United States) Michael Chang (Sweden) Stefan Edberg	(United States) David Wheaton (Peru) Jaime Yzaga (Czechoslovakia) Petr Korda (United States) Jim Grabb
10 Aug	Skoda Czechoslovak Open; Prague, Czechoslovakia; ATP World Series; Clay – $320,000 – 32S/16D; Singles – Doubles	(Czechoslovakia) Karel Nováček; 6–1, 6–1	(Argentina) Franco Davín	(Czechoslovakia) David Rikl (Argentina) Guillermo Pérez Roldán	(Uruguay) Diego Pérez (Australia) Richard Fromberg (Commonwealth of Independent States) Vladimir Gabrichidze (Sweden) Jonas Svensson
10 Aug	Skoda Czechoslovak Open; Prague, Czechoslovakia; ATP World Series; Clay – $320,000 – 32S/16D; Singles – Doubles	(Czechoslovakia) Karel Nováček (Czechoslovakia) Branislav Stankovič; 7–5, 6–1	(Sweden) Jonas Björkman (Australia) Jon Ireland	(Czechoslovakia) David Rikl (Argentina) Guillermo Pérez Roldán	(Uruguay) Diego Pérez (Australia) Richard Fromberg (Commonwealth of Independent States) Vladimir Gabrichidze (Sweden) Jonas Svensson
17 Aug	RCA Championships; Indianapolis, IN, USA; ATP Championship Series; Hard – $865,000 – 56S/28D; Singles – Doubles	(United States) Pete Sampras; 6–4, 6–4	(United States) Jim Courier	(United States) Todd Martin (Germany) Boris Becker	(New Zealand) Brett Steven (Spain) Francisco Clavet (United States) Jimmy Connors (Sweden) Thomas Enqvist
17 Aug	RCA Championships; Indianapolis, IN, USA; ATP Championship Series; Hard – $865,000 – 56S/28D; Singles – Doubles	(United States) Jim Grabb (United States) Richey Reneberg; 7–6, 6–2	(Canada) Grant Connell (Canada) Glenn Michibata	(United States) Todd Martin (Germany) Boris Becker	(New Zealand) Brett Steven (Spain) Francisco Clavet (United States) Jimmy Connors (Sweden) Thomas Enqvist
17 Aug	Volvo International; New Haven, CT, USA; ATP Championship Series; Hard – $865,000 – 56S/28D; Singles – Doubles	(Sweden) Stefan Edberg; 7–6^{(7–4)} 6–1	(United States) MaliVai Washington	(United States) Ivan Lendl (France) Fabrice Santoro	(France) Guy Forget (United States) Michael Chang (Czechoslovakia) Petr Korda (Croatia) Goran Ivanišević
17 Aug	Volvo International; New Haven, CT, USA; ATP Championship Series; Hard – $865,000 – 56S/28D; Singles – Doubles	(United States) Kelly Jones (United States) Rick Leach; 7–5 4–6 7–5	(United States) Patrick McEnroe (United States) Jared Palmer	(United States) Ivan Lendl (France) Fabrice Santoro	(France) Guy Forget (United States) Michael Chang (Czechoslovakia) Petr Korda (Croatia) Goran Ivanišević
24 Aug	Croatia Open; Umag, Croatia; ATP World Series; Clay – $235,000 – 32S/16D; Singles – Doubles	(Austria) Thomas Muster; 6–1, 4–6, 6–4	(Argentina) Franco Davín	(Spain) Jordi Arrese (Austria) Horst Skoff	(Argentina) Guillermo Pérez Roldán (Spain) José Francisco Altur (Commonwealth of Independent States) Andrei Medvedev (Switzerland) Claudio Mezzadri
24 Aug	Croatia Open; Umag, Croatia; ATP World Series; Clay – $235,000 – 32S/16D; Singles – Doubles	(Germany) David Prinosil (Czechoslovakia) Richard Vogel; 6–3, 6–7, 7–6	(Netherlands) Sander Groen (Germany) Lars Koslowski	(Spain) Jordi Arrese (Austria) Horst Skoff	(Argentina) Guillermo Pérez Roldán (Spain) José Francisco Altur (Commonwealth of Independent States) Andrei Medvedev (Switzerland) Claudio Mezzadri
24 Aug	Waldbaum's Hamlet Cup; Long Island, NY, USA; ATP World Series; Hard – $235,000 – 32S/16D; Singles – Doubles	(Czechoslovakia) Petr Korda; 6–2, 6–2	(United States) Ivan Lendl	(Sweden) Stefan Edberg (United States) Michael Chang	(Germany) Carsten Arriens (Italy) Stefano Pescosolido (Germany) Boris Becker (Commonwealth of Independent States) Alexander Volkov
24 Aug	Waldbaum's Hamlet Cup; Long Island, NY, USA; ATP World Series; Hard – $235,000 – 32S/16D; Singles – Doubles	(United States) Francisco Montana (United States) Greg Van Emburgh; 6–4, 6–2	(Italy) Gianluca Pozzi (Finland) Olli Rahnasto	(Sweden) Stefan Edberg (United States) Michael Chang	(Germany) Carsten Arriens (Italy) Stefano Pescosolido (Germany) Boris Becker (Commonwealth of Independent States) Alexander Volkov
24 Aug	OTB Schenectady Open; Schenectady, NY, USA; ATP World Series; Hard – $130,000 – 32S/16D; Singles – Doubles	(South Africa) Wayne Ferreira; 6–2, 6–7^{(5–7)}, 6–2	(Australia) Jamie Morgan	(Commonwealth of Independent States) Andrei Chesnokov (Spain) Emilio Sánchez	(Commonwealth of Independent States) Andrei Olhovskiy (Australia) Richard Fromberg (Spain) Francisco Clavet (Netherlands) Paul Haarhuis
24 Aug	OTB Schenectady Open; Schenectady, NY, USA; ATP World Series; Hard – $130,000 – 32S/16D; Singles – Doubles	(Netherlands) Jacco Eltingh (Netherlands) Paul Haarhuis; 6–3, 6–4	(Spain) Sergio Casal (Spain) Emilio Sánchez	(Commonwealth of Independent States) Andrei Chesnokov (Spain) Emilio Sánchez	(Commonwealth of Independent States) Andrei Olhovskiy (Australia) Richard Fromberg (Spain) Francisco Clavet (Netherlands) Paul Haarhuis
31 Aug; 7 Sep	US Open; New York City, USA; Grand Slam; Hard – $3,566,400 – 128S/64D/32XD; Singles – Doubles – Mixed doubles	(Sweden) Stefan Edberg; 3–6, 6–4, 7–6^{(7–5)}, 6–2	(United States) Pete Sampras	(United States) Jim Courier (United States) Michael Chang	(United States) Andre Agassi (Commonwealth of Independent States) Alexander Volkov (South Africa) Wayne Ferreira (United States) Ivan Lendl
31 Aug; 7 Sep	US Open; New York City, USA; Grand Slam; Hard – $3,566,400 – 128S/64D/32XD; Singles – Doubles – Mixed doubles	(United States) Jim Grabb (United States) Richey Reneberg; 3–6, 7–6, 6–3, 6–3	(United States) Kelly Jones (United States) Rick Leach	(United States) Jim Courier (United States) Michael Chang	(United States) Andre Agassi (Commonwealth of Independent States) Alexander Volkov (South Africa) Wayne Ferreira (United States) Ivan Lendl
31 Aug; 7 Sep	US Open; New York City, USA; Grand Slam; Hard – $3,566,400 – 128S/64D/32XD; Singles – Doubles – Mixed doubles	(Australia) Nicole Provis (Australia) Mark Woodforde; 4–6, 6–3, 6–3	(Czechoslovakia) Helena Suková (Netherlands) Tom Nijssen	(United States) Jim Courier (United States) Michael Chang	(United States) Andre Agassi (Commonwealth of Independent States) Alexander Volkov (South Africa) Wayne Ferreira (United States) Ivan Lendl

=== September ===
Week	Tournament	Champions	Runners-up	Semifinalists	Quarterfinalists
14 Sep	Cologne Open; Cologne, Germany; ATP World Series; Clay – $240,000 – 32S/16D	(Germany) Bernd Karbacher; 7–6^{(7–4)}, 6–4	(South Africa) Marcos Ondruska	(Spain) Javier Sánchez (Germany) Karsten Braasch	(Austria) Thomas Muster (Italy) Renzo Furlan (Uruguay) Marcelo Filippini (Sweden) Jan Gunnarsson
14 Sep	Cologne Open; Cologne, Germany; ATP World Series; Clay – $240,000 – 32S/16D	(Argentina) Horacio de la Peña (Argentina) Gustavo Luza; 6–7, 6–0, 6–2	(Sweden) Ronnie Båthman (Belgium) Libor Pimek	(Spain) Javier Sánchez (Germany) Karsten Braasch	(Austria) Thomas Muster (Italy) Renzo Furlan (Uruguay) Marcelo Filippini (Sweden) Jan Gunnarsson
14 Sep	Grand Prix Passing Shot; Bordeaux, France; ATP World Series; Clay – $300,000 – 32S/16D; Singles – Doubles	(Commonwealth of Independent States) Andrei Medvedev; 6–3, 1–6, 6–2	(Spain) Sergi Bruguera	(France) Cédric Pioline (France) Rodolphe Gilbert	(United States) Ivan Lendl (Spain) Germán López (France) Guy Forget (Spain) Carlos Costa
14 Sep	Grand Prix Passing Shot; Bordeaux, France; ATP World Series; Clay – $300,000 – 32S/16D; Singles – Doubles	(Spain) Sergio Casal (Spain) Emilio Sánchez; 6–1, 6–4	(France) Arnaud Boetsch (France) Guy Forget	(France) Cédric Pioline (France) Rodolphe Gilbert	(United States) Ivan Lendl (Spain) Germán López (France) Guy Forget (Spain) Carlos Costa
21 Sep	Davis Cup: Semifinals; Geneva, Switzerland – carpet (i); Minneapolis, United States – clay (i)	Semifinal winners Switzerland 5–0; United States 4–1	Semifinal losers Brazil; Sweden		
28 Sep	Campionati Internazionali di Sicilia; Palermo, Italy; ATP World Series; Clay – $285,000 – 32S/16D; Singles – Doubles	(Spain) Sergi Bruguera; 6–1, 6–3	(Spain) Emilio Sánchez	(Italy) Renzo Furlan (Spain) Francisco Clavet	(Argentina) Guillermo Pérez Roldán (Spain) Tomás Carbonell (Austria) Horst Skoff (France) Frédéric Fontang
28 Sep	Campionati Internazionali di Sicilia; Palermo, Italy; ATP World Series; Clay – $285,000 – 32S/16D; Singles – Doubles	(Sweden) Johan Donar (Sweden) Ola Jonsson; 5–7, 6–3, 6–4	(Argentina) Horacio de la Peña (Czechoslovakia) Vojtěch Flégl	(Italy) Renzo Furlan (Spain) Francisco Clavet	(Argentina) Guillermo Pérez Roldán (Spain) Tomás Carbonell (Austria) Horst Skoff (France) Frédéric Fontang
28 Sep	Queensland Open; Brisbane, Australia; ATP World Series; Hard – $235,000 – 32S/16D	(France) Guillaume Raoux; 6–4, 7–6^{(12–10)}	(Denmark) Kenneth Carlsen	(Italy) Diego Nargiso (Sweden) Thomas Högstedt	(Australia) Neil Borwick (Sweden) Lars-Anders Wahlgren (United States) Jonathan Stark (United States) Jim Grabb
28 Sep	Queensland Open; Brisbane, Australia; ATP World Series; Hard – $235,000 – 32S/16D	(United States) Steve DeVries (Australia) David Macpherson; 6–4, 6–4	(United States) Patrick McEnroe (United States) Jonathan Stark	(Italy) Diego Nargiso (Sweden) Thomas Högstedt	(Australia) Neil Borwick (Sweden) Lars-Anders Wahlgren (United States) Jonathan Stark (United States) Jim Grabb
28 Sep	Swiss Indoors; Basel, Switzerland; ATP World Series; Hard (i) – $700,000 – 32S/16D; Singles – Doubles	(Germany) Boris Becker; 3–6, 6–3, 6–2, 6–4	(Czechoslovakia) Petr Korda	(United States) Ivan Lendl (Switzerland) Marc Rosset	(France) Cédric Pioline (Commonwealth of Independent States) Andrei Chesnokov (Sweden) Peter Lundgren (Israel) Amos Mansdorf
28 Sep	Swiss Indoors; Basel, Switzerland; ATP World Series; Hard (i) – $700,000 – 32S/16D; Singles – Doubles	(Netherlands) Tom Nijssen (Czechoslovakia) Cyril Suk; 6–3, 6–4	(Czechoslovakia) Karel Nováček (Czechoslovakia) David Rikl	(United States) Ivan Lendl (Switzerland) Marc Rosset	(France) Cédric Pioline (Commonwealth of Independent States) Andrei Chesnokov (Sweden) Peter Lundgren (Israel) Amos Mansdorf

=== October ===
Week	Tournament	Champions	Runners-up	Semifinalists	Quarterfinalists
5 Oct	Saab International; Athens, Greece; ATP World Series; Clay – $130,000 – 32S/16D; Singles – Doubles	(Spain) Jordi Arrese; 7–5, 3–0 ret.	(Spain) Sergi Bruguera	(Spain) Javier Sánchez (Spain) Francisco Clavet	(Sweden) Magnus Gustafsson (Bulgaria) Milen Velev (Argentina) Martín Jaite (Germany) Marc-Kevin Goellner
5 Oct	Saab International; Athens, Greece; ATP World Series; Clay – $130,000 – 32S/16D; Singles – Doubles	(Spain) Tomás Carbonell (Spain) Francisco Roig; 6–3, 6–4	(Uruguay) Marcelo Filippini (Netherlands) Mark Koevermans	(Spain) Javier Sánchez (Spain) Francisco Clavet	(Sweden) Magnus Gustafsson (Bulgaria) Milen Velev (Argentina) Martín Jaite (Germany) Marc-Kevin Goellner
5 Oct	Grand Prix de Tennis de Toulouse; Toulouse, France; ATP World Series; Hard (i) – $275,000 – 32S/16D; Singles – Doubles	(France) Guy Forget; 6–3, 6–2	(Czechoslovakia) Petr Korda	(Netherlands) Jan Siemerink (France) Arnaud Boetsch	(Sweden) Jonas Svensson (United States) Brad Gilbert (Sweden) Christian Bergström (Commonwealth of Independent States) Andrei Medvedev
5 Oct	Grand Prix de Tennis de Toulouse; Toulouse, France; ATP World Series; Hard (i) – $275,000 – 32S/16D; Singles – Doubles	(United States) Brad Pearce (South Africa) Byron Talbot; 6–1, 3–6, 6–3	(France) Guy Forget (France) Henri Leconte	(Netherlands) Jan Siemerink (France) Arnaud Boetsch	(Sweden) Jonas Svensson (United States) Brad Gilbert (Sweden) Christian Bergström (Commonwealth of Independent States) Andrei Medvedev
5 Oct	Australian Indoor Championships; Sydney, Australia; ATP Championship Series; Hard (i) – $825,000 – 48S/24D; Singles – Doubles	(Croatia) Goran Ivanišević; 6–4, 6–2, 6–4	(Sweden) Stefan Edberg	(Sweden) Henrik Holm (Netherlands) Richard Krajicek	(United States) John McEnroe (Germany) Patrik Kühnen (United States) Ivan Lendl (Netherlands) Paul Haarhuis
5 Oct	Australian Indoor Championships; Sydney, Australia; ATP Championship Series; Hard (i) – $825,000 – 48S/24D; Singles – Doubles	(United States) Patrick McEnroe (United States) Jonathan Stark; 7–6, 6–3	(United States) Jim Grabb (United States) Richey Reneberg	(Sweden) Henrik Holm (Netherlands) Richard Krajicek	(United States) John McEnroe (Germany) Patrik Kühnen (United States) Ivan Lendl (Netherlands) Paul Haarhuis
12 Oct	Tokyo Indoor; Tokyo, Japan; ATP Championship Series; Carpet (i) – $825,000 – 64S/32D; Singles – Doubles	(United States) Ivan Lendl; 7–6^{(9–7)}, 6–4	(Sweden) Henrik Holm	(Commonwealth of Independent States) Alexander Volkov (United States) Michael Chang	(Sweden) Stefan Edberg (South Africa) Wayne Ferreira (Croatia) Goran Ivanišević (United States) Kenny Thorne
12 Oct	Tokyo Indoor; Tokyo, Japan; ATP Championship Series; Carpet (i) – $825,000 – 64S/32D; Singles – Doubles	(Australia) Todd Woodbridge (Australia) Mark Woodforde; 7–6, 7–6	(United States) Jim Grabb (United States) Richey Reneberg	(Commonwealth of Independent States) Alexander Volkov (United States) Michael Chang	(Sweden) Stefan Edberg (South Africa) Wayne Ferreira (Croatia) Goran Ivanišević (United States) Kenny Thorne
12 Oct	ATP Bolzano; Bolzano, Italy; ATP World Series; Carpet (i) – $270,000 – 32S/16D	(Sweden) Thomas Enqvist; 6–2, 1–6, 7–6^{(9–7)}	(France) Arnaud Boetsch	(France) Olivier Delaître (Commonwealth of Independent States) Andrei Cherkasov	(Italy) Paolo Canè (Italy) Omar Camporese (Commonwealth of Independent States) Andrei Medvedev (Sweden) Jonas Svensson
12 Oct	ATP Bolzano; Bolzano, Italy; ATP World Series; Carpet (i) – $270,000 – 32S/16D	(Sweden) Anders Järryd (Norway) Bent-Ove Pedersen; 6–1, 6–7, 6–3	(Netherlands) Tom Nijssen (Czechoslovakia) Cyril Suk	(France) Olivier Delaître (Commonwealth of Independent States) Andrei Cherkasov	(Italy) Paolo Canè (Italy) Omar Camporese (Commonwealth of Independent States) Andrei Medvedev (Sweden) Jonas Svensson
12 Oct	Tel Aviv Open; Tel Aviv, Israel; ATP World Series; Hard – $130,000 – 32S/16D; Singles – Doubles	(United States) Jeff Tarango; 4–6, 6–3, 6–4	(France) Stéphane Simian	(Austria) Thomas Muster (Portugal) João Cunha-Silva	(Israel) Gilad Bloom (Israel) Amos Mansdorf (France) Richard Matuszewski (South Africa) Marcos Ondruska
12 Oct	Tel Aviv Open; Tel Aviv, Israel; ATP World Series; Hard – $130,000 – 32S/16D; Singles – Doubles	(United States) Mike Bauer (Portugal) João Cunha-Silva; 6–3, 6–4	(Netherlands) Mark Koevermans (Sweden) Tobias Svantesson	(Austria) Thomas Muster (Portugal) João Cunha-Silva	(Israel) Gilad Bloom (Israel) Amos Mansdorf (France) Richard Matuszewski (South Africa) Marcos Ondruska
19 Oct	CA-TennisTrophy; Vienna, Austria; ATP World Series; Carpet (i) – $280,000 – 32S/16D; Singles – Doubles	(Czechoslovakia) Petr Korda; 6–3, 6–2, 5–7, 6–1	(Italy) Gianluca Pozzi	(Netherlands) Jan Siemerink (Commonwealth of Independent States) Andrei Chesnokov	(Austria) Alex Antonitsch (United States) Brad Gilbert (Germany) David Prinosil (Germany) Thomas Gollwitzer
19 Oct	CA-TennisTrophy; Vienna, Austria; ATP World Series; Carpet (i) – $280,000 – 32S/16D; Singles – Doubles	(Sweden) Ronnie Båthman (Sweden) Anders Järryd; 6–3, 7–5	(United States) Kent Kinnear (Germany) Udo Riglewski	(Netherlands) Jan Siemerink (Commonwealth of Independent States) Andrei Chesnokov	(Austria) Alex Antonitsch (United States) Brad Gilbert (Germany) David Prinosil (Germany) Thomas Gollwitzer
19 Oct	Lyon Grand Prix; Lyon, France; ATP World Series; Carpet (i) – $550,000 – 32S/16D; Singles – Doubles	(United States) Pete Sampras; 6–4, 6–2	(France) Cédric Pioline	(United States) MaliVai Washington (United States) Richey Reneberg	(Germany) Markus Zoecke (Czechoslovakia) Karel Nováček (United States) Dave Randall (France) Arnaud Boetsch
19 Oct	Lyon Grand Prix; Lyon, France; ATP World Series; Carpet (i) – $550,000 – 32S/16D; Singles – Doubles	(Switzerland) Jakob Hlasek (Switzerland) Marc Rosset; 6–1, 6–3	(United Kingdom) Neil Broad (South Africa) Stefan Kruger	(United States) MaliVai Washington (United States) Richey Reneberg	(Germany) Markus Zoecke (Czechoslovakia) Karel Nováček (United States) Dave Randall (France) Arnaud Boetsch
19 Oct	Pacific Cup International; Taipei, Taiwan; ATP World Series; Carpet (i) – $270,000 – 32S/16D	(United States) Jim Grabb; 6–3, 6–3	(Australia) Jamie Morgan	(Germany) Patrik Kühnen (Commonwealth of Independent States) Andrei Olhovskiy	(Israel) Gilad Bloom (New Zealand) Brett Steven (Italy) Diego Nargiso (Denmark) Kenneth Carlsen
19 Oct	Pacific Cup International; Taipei, Taiwan; ATP World Series; Carpet (i) – $270,000 – 32S/16D	(Australia) John Fitzgerald (Australia) Sandon Stolle; 7–6, 6–2	(South Africa) Christo van Rensburg (Germany) Patrick Baur	(Germany) Patrik Kühnen (Commonwealth of Independent States) Andrei Olhovskiy	(Israel) Gilad Bloom (New Zealand) Brett Steven (Italy) Diego Nargiso (Denmark) Kenneth Carlsen
26 Oct	Stockholm Open; Stockholm, Sweden; ATP Championship Series, Single Week; Carpet (i) – $1,040,000 – 48S/24D; Singles – Doubles	(Croatia) Goran Ivanišević; 7–6^{(7–2)}, 4–6, 7–6^{(7–5)}, 6–2	(France) Guy Forget	(United States) Pete Sampras (Sweden) Stefan Edberg	(Sweden) Henrik Holm (Czechoslovakia) Petr Korda (Germany) Boris Becker (France) Arnaud Boetsch
26 Oct	Stockholm Open; Stockholm, Sweden; ATP Championship Series, Single Week; Carpet (i) – $1,040,000 – 48S/24D; Singles – Doubles	(Australia) Todd Woodbridge (Australia) Mark Woodforde; 6–4, 6–4	(United States) Steve DeVries (Australia) David Macpherson	(United States) Pete Sampras (Sweden) Stefan Edberg	(Sweden) Henrik Holm (Czechoslovakia) Petr Korda (Germany) Boris Becker (France) Arnaud Boetsch
26 Oct	Guarujá Open; Guarujá, Brazil; ATP World Series; Hard – $130,000 – 32S/16D	(Germany) Carsten Arriens; 7–6^{(7–5)}, 6–3	(Spain) Àlex Corretja	(Brazil) Fernando Roese (Argentina) Javier Frana	(Spain) Jordi Arrese (Spain) Alejo Mancisidor (Germany) Lars Koslowski (Argentina) Martín Jaite
26 Oct	Guarujá Open; Guarujá, Brazil; ATP World Series; Hard – $130,000 – 32S/16D	(Sweden) Christer Allgårdh (Australia) Carl Limberger; 6–4, 6–3	(Uruguay) Diego Pérez (Spain) Francisco Roig	(Brazil) Fernando Roese (Argentina) Javier Frana	(Spain) Jordi Arrese (Spain) Alejo Mancisidor (Germany) Lars Koslowski (Argentina) Martín Jaite

=== November ===
Week	Tournament	Champions	Runners-up	Semifinalists	Quarterfinalists
2 Nov	Kolynos Cup; Búzios, Brazil; ATP World Series; Hard – $155,000 – 32S/16D	(Brazil) Jaime Oncins; 6–3, 6–2	(Mexico) Luis Herrera	(Spain) Francisco Roig (Brazil) Cássio Motta	(Brazil) Fernando Roese (Argentina) Martín Jaite (Uruguay) Marcelo Filippini (Argentina) Alberto Mancini
2 Nov	Kolynos Cup; Búzios, Brazil; ATP World Series; Hard – $155,000 – 32S/16D	(Venezuela) Maurice Ruah (Cuba) Mario Tabares; 7–6, 6–7, 6–4	(United States) Mark Keil (United States) Tom Mercer	(Spain) Francisco Roig (Brazil) Cássio Motta	(Brazil) Fernando Roese (Argentina) Martín Jaite (Uruguay) Marcelo Filippini (Argentina) Alberto Mancini
2 Nov	Paris Open; Paris, France; ATP Championship Series, Single Week; Carpet (i) – $1,815,000 – 48S/24D; Singles – Doubles	(Germany) Boris Becker; 7–6^{(7–3)}, 6–3, 3–6, 6–3	(France) Guy Forget	(Croatia) Goran Ivanišević (Switzerland) Jakob Hlasek	(United States) Jim Courier (United States) David Wheaton (Sweden) Stefan Edberg (France) Henri Leconte
2 Nov	Paris Open; Paris, France; ATP Championship Series, Single Week; Carpet (i) – $1,815,000 – 48S/24D; Singles – Doubles	(United States) John McEnroe (United States) Patrick McEnroe; 7–6, 6–3	(United States) Patrick Galbraith (South Africa) Danie Visser	(Croatia) Goran Ivanišević (Switzerland) Jakob Hlasek	(United States) Jim Courier (United States) David Wheaton (Sweden) Stefan Edberg (France) Henri Leconte
9 Nov	Banespa Open; São Paulo, Brazil; ATP World Series; Hard – $235,000 – 32S/16D; Singles – Doubles	(Brazil) Luiz Mattar; 6–1, 6–4	(Brazil) Jaime Oncins	(Argentina) Alberto Mancini (Peru) Jaime Yzaga	(Brazil) Fernando Roese (Argentina) Martín Jaite (United States) Chuck Adams (Germany) Patrick Baur
9 Nov	Banespa Open; São Paulo, Brazil; ATP World Series; Hard – $235,000 – 32S/16D; Singles – Doubles	(Uruguay) Diego Pérez (Spain) Francisco Roig; 6–2, 7–6	(Sweden) Christer Allgårdh (Australia) Carl Limberger	(Argentina) Alberto Mancini (Peru) Jaime Yzaga	(Brazil) Fernando Roese (Argentina) Martín Jaite (United States) Chuck Adams (Germany) Patrick Baur
9 Nov	European Community Championships; Antwerp, Belgium; ATP World Series; Carpet (i) – $1,000,000 – 32S/16D	(Netherlands) Richard Krajicek; 6–2, 6–2	(Australia) Mark Woodforde	(United States) Jim Courier (United States) Michael Chang	(France) Guy Forget (Czechoslovakia) Petr Korda (Sweden) Magnus Larsson (Germany) Michael Stich
9 Nov	European Community Championships; Antwerp, Belgium; ATP World Series; Carpet (i) – $1,000,000 – 32S/16D	(Australia) John Fitzgerald (Sweden) Anders Järryd; 6–2, 6–2	(United States) Patrick McEnroe (United States) Jared Palmer	(United States) Jim Courier (United States) Michael Chang	(France) Guy Forget (Czechoslovakia) Petr Korda (Sweden) Magnus Larsson (Germany) Michael Stich
9 Nov	Kremlin Cup; Moscow, Russia; ATP World Series; Carpet (i) – $315,000 – 32S/16D; Singles – Doubles	(Switzerland) Marc Rosset; 6–2, 6–2	(Germany) Carl-Uwe Steeb	(France) Cédric Pioline (Switzerland) Jakob Hlasek	(Czechoslovakia) Karel Nováček (Commonwealth of Independent States) Andrei Cherkasov (Commonwealth of Independent States) Andrei Medvedev (Israel) Gilad Bloom
9 Nov	Kremlin Cup; Moscow, Russia; ATP World Series; Carpet (i) – $315,000 – 32S/16D; Singles – Doubles	(South Africa) Marius Barnard (South Africa) John-Laffnie de Jager; 6–4, 3–6, 7–6	(South Africa) David Adams (Commonwealth of Independent States) Andrei Olhovskiy	(France) Cédric Pioline (Switzerland) Jakob Hlasek	(Czechoslovakia) Karel Nováček (Commonwealth of Independent States) Andrei Cherkasov (Commonwealth of Independent States) Andrei Medvedev (Israel) Gilad Bloom
16 Nov	ATP Tour World Championships (singles); Frankfurt, Germany; ATP Tour World Championships; Carpet (i) – $2,500,000 – 8S (RR); Singles	(Germany) Boris Becker; 6–4, 6–3, 7–5	(United States) Jim Courier	(Croatia) Goran Ivanišević (United States) Pete Sampras	Round robin (Netherlands) Richard Krajicek (United States) Michael Chang (Sweden) Stefan Edberg (Czechoslovakia) Petr Korda
16 Nov	ATP Tour World Championships (doubles); Johannesburg, South Africa; ATP Tour World Championships; Hard (i) – $1,000,000 – 8D (RR); Doubles	(Australia) Todd Woodbridge (Australia) Mark Woodforde; 6–2, 7–6^{(7–4)}, 5–7, 3–6, 6–3	(Australia) John Fitzgerald (Sweden) Anders Järryd	(Australia) Mark Kratzmann / (Australia) Wally Masur (Spain) Sergio Casal / (Spain) Emilio Sánchez	
30 Nov	Davis Cup: Final; Fort Worth, Texas, United States – hard (i)	United States; 3–1	Switzerland		

=== December ===
Week	Tournament	Champions	Runners-up	Semifinalists	Quarterfinalists
7 Dec	Grand Slam Cup; Munich, Germany; Grand Slam Cup	(Germany) Michael Stich; 6–2, 6–3, 6–2	(United States) Michael Chang	(United States) Pete Sampras (Croatia) Goran Ivanišević	(Netherlands) Richard Krajicek (France) Henri Leconte (United States) John McEnroe (Czechoslovakia) Petr Korda

== ATP rankings ==
As of 6 January 1992
Rk	Name	Nation
1	Stefan Edberg	SWE
2	Jim Courier	USA
3	Boris Becker	GER
4	Michael Stich	GER
5	Ivan Lendl	TCH
6	Pete Sampras	USA
7	Guy Forget	FRA
8	Karel Nováček	TCH
9	Petr Korda	TCH
10	Andre Agassi	USA
11	Sergi Bruguera	ESP
12	Goran Ivanišević	CRO
13	Magnus Gustafsson	SWE
14	Derrick Rostagno	USA
15	Emilio Sánchez	ESP
16	Michael Chang	USA
17	David Wheaton	USA
18	Goran Prpić	CRO
19	Brad Gilbert	USA
20	Jakob Hlasek	SUI

Year-end rankings 1992 (28 December 1992)
Rk	Name	Nation	Points	High	Low	Change
1	Jim Courier	USA	3599	1	2	▲1
2	Stefan Edberg	SWE	3236	1	3	▼1
3	Pete Sampras	USA	3074	2	6	▲3
4	Goran Ivanišević	CRO	2718	4	13	▲8
5	Boris Becker	GER	2530	3	10	▼2
6	Michael Chang	USA	2277	4	16	▲10
7	Petr Korda	TCH	2174	5	11	▲2
8	Ivan Lendl	USA	1985	4	12	▼3
9	Andre Agassi	USA	1852	6	17	▲1
10	Richard Krajicek	NED	1816	10	45	▲34
11	Guy Forget	FRA	1717	6	14	▼4
12	Wayne Ferreira	RSA	1679	9	46	▲30
13	MaliVai Washington	USA	1610	11	47	▲34
14	Carlos Costa	ESP	1539	10	59	▲42
15	Michael Stich	GER	1401	4	17	▼11
16	Sergi Bruguera	ESP	1323	11	28	▼5
17	Alexander Volkov	RUS	1309	15	31	▲6
18	Thomas Muster	AUT	1228	17	38	▲19
19	Henrik Holm	SWE	1184	19	143	▲111
20	John McEnroe	USA	1158	17	37	▲8

== Statistical information ==
List of players and titles won, alphabetically by last name:

- (United States) Andre Agassi – Atlanta, Wimbledon, Canada Masters (3)
- (Spain) Jordi Arrese – Athens (1)
- (Germany) Carsten Arriens – Guarujá (1)
- (Germany) Boris Becker – Brussels, Rotterdam, Basel, Paris Masters, Season-Ending Championships (5)
- (Spain) Sergi Bruguera – Madrid, Gstaad, Palermo (3)
- (Italy) Omar Camporese – Milan (1)
- (Spain) Tomás Carbonell – Maceio (1)
- (United States) Michael Chang – San Francisco, Indian Wells Masters, Miami Masters (3)
- (Spain) Carlos Costa – Estoril, Barcelona (2)
- (United States) Jim Courier – Australian Open, Tokyo, Hong Kong, Rome Masters, French Open (5)
- (Sweden) Stefan Edberg – Hamburg Masters, New Haven, US Open (3)
- (Netherlands) Jacco Eltingh – Manchester (1)
- (Sweden) Thomas Enqvist – Bolzano (1)
- (South Africa) Wayne Ferreira – London, Schenectady (2)
- (France) Guy Forget – Toulouse (1)
- (United States) Jim Grabb – Taipei (1)
- (Sweden) Magnus Gustafsson – Båstad (1)
- (Croatia) Goran Ivanišević – Adelaide, Stuttgart, Sydney Indoors, Stockholm Masters (4)
- (Germany) Bernd Karbacher – Cologne (1)
- (Czech Republic) Petr Korda – Washington, D.C., Long Island, Vienna (3)
- (Netherlands) Richard Krajicek – Los Angeles, Antwerp (2)
- (United States) Aaron Krickstein – Johannesburg (1)
- (Sweden) Magnus Larsson – Copenhagen, Munich (2)
- (United States) Ivan Lendl – Tokyo Indoors (1)
- (Argentina) Gabriel Markus – Nice (1)
- (Japan) Shuzo Matsuoka – Seoul (1)
- (Brazil) Luiz Mattar – São Paulo (1)
- (Commonwealth of Independent States) Andrei Medvedev – Genova, Stuttgart, Bordeaux (3)
- (Austria) Thomas Muster – Monte Carlo Masters, Florence, Umag (3)
- (Czech Republic) Karel Nováček – Hilversum, San Marino, Prague (3)
- (Brazil) Jaime Oncins – Bologna, Búzios (2)
- (Argentina) Guillermo Pérez Roldán – Casablanca (1)
- (Italy) Stefano Pescosolido – Scottsdale (1)
- (France) Guillaume Raoux – Brisbane (1)
- (Switzerland) Marc Rosset – Barcelona Olympics, Moscow (2)
- (United States) Pete Sampras – Philadelphia, Kitzbühel, Cincinnati Masters, Indianapolis, Lyon (5)
- (Spain) Emilio Sánchez – Sydney (1)
- (United States) Bryan Shelton – Newport (1)
- (Germany) Michael Stich – Rosmalen, Grand Slam Cup (2)
- (United States) Jeff Tarango – Wellington, Tel Aviv (2)
- (United States) MaliVai Washington – Memphis, Charlotte (2)
- (Australia) Simon Youl – Singapore (1)
- (Peru) Jaime Yzaga – Auckland, Tampa (2)

The following players won their first title:

- (Germany) Carsten Arriens
- (Spain) Tomás Carbonell
- (Spain) Carlos Costa
- (Netherlands) Jacco Eltingh
- (Sweden) Thomas Enqvist
- (South Africa) Wayne Ferreira
- (Germany) Bernd Karbacher
- (Argentina) Gabriel Markus
- (Japan) Shuzo Matsuoka
- (Commonwealth of Independent States) Andrei Medvedev
- (Brazil) Jaime Oncins
- (Italy) Stefano Pescosolido
- (France) Guillaume Raoux
- (United States) Jeff Tarango
- (United States) MaliVai Washington

== See also ==
- 1992 WTA Tour – women's tour
