= 1992 Banespa Open =

- Date: 9–15 November
- Edition: 7th
- Category: World Series
- Draw: 32S / 16D
- Prize money: $235,000
- Surface: Hard / outdoor
- Location: São Paulo, Brazil
- Venue: Hotel Transamerica

Champions

Singles
- (Brazil) Luiz Mattar

Doubles
- (Uruguay) Diego Pérez / (Spain) Francisco Roig
- ATP São Paulo

The 1992 Banespa Open was a men's tennis tournament played on outdoor hard courts at the Hotel Transamerica in São Paulo, Brazil that was part of the World Series category of the 1992 ATP Tour. It was the seventh edition of the tournament and took place from 9 November through 15 November 1992. Sixth-seeded Luiz Mattar won the singles title.

== Finals ==
=== Singles ===
(Brazil) Luiz Mattar defeated (Brazil) Jaime Oncins 6–1, 6–4

- It was Mattar's only singles title of the year and the 6th of his career.

=== Doubles ===
(Uruguay) Diego Pérez / (Spain) Francisco Roig defeated (Sweden) Christer Allgårdh / (Australia) Carl Limberger 6–2, 7–6

- It was Pérez's only doubles title of the year and the 2nd of his career. It was Roig's 2nd and last doubles title of the year and the 3rd of his career.
