= 1992 Salem Open =

- Date: 13–19 April
- Edition: 17th
- Category: World Series (Free Week)
- Draw: 32S / 16D
- Prize money: $270,000
- Surface: Hard / outdoor
- Location: Hong Kong, Hong Kong

Champions

Singles
- (United States) Jim Courier

Doubles
- (United States) Brad Gilbert / (United States) Jim Grabb
- Hong Kong Open

The 1992 Salem Open was a men's tennis tournament played on outdoor hard courts on Hong Kong Island in Hong Kong that was part of the World Series of the 1992 ATP Tour. It was the 17th edition of the tournament and was held from 13 April through 19 April 1992. First-seeded Jim Courier won the singles title.

== Finals ==
=== Singles ===
(United States) Jim Courier defeated (United States) Michael Chang 7–5, 6–3

- It was Courier's 3rd singles title of the year and the 7th of his career.

=== Doubles ===
(United States) Brad Gilbert / (United States) Jim Grabb defeated (Zimbabwe) Byron Black / (South Africa) Byron Talbot 6–2, 6–1

- It was Gilbert's only doubles title of the year and the 3rd and last of his career. It was Grabb's 3rd doubles title of the year and the 10th of his career.
