= 1992 Muratti Time Indoor =

- Date: 3–9 February 1992
- Edition: 15th
- Category: ATP World Series (Free Week)
- Draw: 32S / 16D
- Prize money: $565,000
- Surface: Carpet / indoor
- Location: Milan, Italy
- Venue: Assago Forum

Champions

Singles
- (Italy) Omar Camporese

Doubles
- (United Kingdom) Neil Broad / (Australia) David Macpherson
- Milan Indoor

The 1992 Muratti Time Indoor was a men's tennis tournament played on indoor carpet courts at the Assago Forum in Milan, Italy that was part of the ATP World Series of the 1992 ATP Tour. It was the 15th edition of the tournament and was held from 3 February until 9 February 1992. Unseeded Omar Camporese won the singles title.

== Finals ==
=== Singles ===
(Italy) Omar Camporese defeated (Croatia) Goran Ivanišević, 3–6, 6–3, 6–4

- It was Camporese's first singles title of the year and the second and last of his career.

=== Doubles ===
(United Kingdom) Neil Broad / (Australia) David Macpherson defeated (Spain) Sergio Casal / (Spain) Emilio Sánchez, 5–7, 7–5, 6–4
