= 1992 BP Nationals =

1992 BP National Championships
- Date: 30 December 1991 – 5 January 1992
- Edition: 5th
- Category: World Series
- Draw: 32S / 16D
- Prize money: $157,500
- Surface: Hard / outdoor
- Location: Wellington, New Zealand

Champions

Singles
- (United States) Jeff Tarango

Doubles
- (United States) Jared Palmer / (United States) Jonathan Stark
- BP National Championships

The 1992 BP National Championships was a men's tennis tournament played on outdoor hard courts in Wellington in New Zealand that was part of the World Series of the 1992 ATP Tour. It was the fifth edition of the tournament and was held from 30 December 1991 through 5 January 1992. Unseeded Jeff Tarango won the singles title.

== Finals ==
=== Singles ===
(United States) Jeff Tarango defeated (Commonwealth of Independent States) Alexander Volkov 6–1, 6–0, 6–3

- It was Tarango's 1st singles title of his career.

=== Doubles ===
(United States) Jared Palmer / (United States) Jonathan Stark defeated (Netherlands) Michiel Schapers / (Czechoslovakia) Daniel Vacek 6–3, 6–3

== See also ==
- 1992 Fernleaf Butter Classic – women's tournament
