= 1992 Estoril Open – Singles =

Singles
- 1992 Estoril Open

Final
- Champion: (Spain) Carlos Costa
- Runner-up: (Spain) Sergi Bruguera
- Score: 4–6, 6–2, 6–2

Details
- Draw: 32
- Seeds: 8

Events
Singles	Doubles
← 1991 ·	Estoril Open	· 1993 →

Sergi Bruguera was the defending champion, but finished runner-up this year.

Carlos Costa won the tournament, beating Bruguera in the final, 4–6, 6–2, 6–2.

== Seeds ==
1. (Czech Republic) Ivan Lendl (quarterfinals)
2. (Spain) Emilio Sánchez (semifinals)
3. (Czech Republic) Karel Nováček (second round)
4. (Spain) Sergi Bruguera (final)
5. (Spain) Francisco Clavet (first round)
6. (Croatia) Goran Prpić (first round)
7. (Spain) Jordi Arrese (semifinals)
8. (Spain) Javier Sánchez (first round)

== Draw ==
=== Key ===
- Q = Qualifier
- WC = Wild card
- LL = Lucky loser
- Alt = Alternate
- ITF = ITF entry
- PR = Protected ranking
- SR = Special ranking
- SE = Special exempt
- JE = Junior exempt
- JR = Junior Accelerator Programme entrant
- CO = College Accelerator Programme entrant
- NG = Next Gen Accelerator Program entrant
- w/o = Walkover
- r = Retired
- d = Defaulted

=== Finals ===
Semifinals
7	(Spain) Jordi Arrese	1	1
4	(Spain) Sergi Bruguera	6	6
(Spain) Carlos Costa	4	7^{7}	7^{7}
2	(Spain) Emilio Sánchez	6	6^{5}	6^{5}

Final
4	(Spain) Sergi Bruguera	6	2	2
(Spain) Carlos Costa	4	6	6

=== Top half ===
First round
1	(Czechoslovakia) I Lendl	7	3
(Netherlands) M Koevermans	5	0^{r}
Q	(Spain) J Molina	6	6
(Haiti) R Agénor	1	1
LL	(Germany) U Riglewski	7^{11}	7
(Argentina) C Miniussi	6^{9}	5
(Argentina) R Azar	2	3
7	(Spain) J Arrese	6	6
4	(Spain) S Bruguera	6	6
Q	(Germany) M Geserer	3	1
(France) R Gilbert	6	6
(Spain) T Carbonell	2	2
Q	(Portugal) B Mota	3	3
WC	(Portugal) J Cunha e Silva	6	6
(Austria) H Skoff	6	6
5	(Spain) F Clavet	3	2

Second round
1	(Czechoslovakia) I Lendl	5	6	6
Q	(Spain) J Molina	7	4	2
LL	(Germany) U Riglewski	5	2
7	(Spain) J Arrese	7	6
4	(Spain) S Bruguera	6	6
(France) R Gilbert	3	2
WC	(Portugal) J Cunha e Silva	7^{7}	4
(Austria) H Skoff	6^{4}	1^{r}

Quarterfinals
1	(Czechoslovakia) I Lendl	3	6	5
7	(Spain) J Arrese	6	4	7
4	(Spain) S Bruguera	6	6
WC	(Portugal) J Cunha e Silva	2	1

Semifinals
7	(Spain) J Arrese	1	1
4	(Spain) S Bruguera	6	6

=== Bottom half ===
First round
6	(Croatia) G Prpić	1	6^{8}
(Spain) C Costa	6	7^{10}
(Ecuador) A Gómez	6	7^{9}
WC	(Portugal) E Couto	3	6^{7}
(Argentina) H de la Peña	6	6
(Finland) V Paloheimo	3	3
WC	(Portugal) N Marques	2	2
3	(Czech Republic) K Nováček	6	6
8	(Spain) J Sánchez	4	6^{8}
(France) F Fontang	6	7^{10}
(Spain) G López	6^{5}	7	6
(Argentina) M Jaite	7^{7}	5	2
(Italy) R Furlan	6^{2}	6	6
(Austria) T Muster	7^{7}	3	4
Q	(Estonia) A Võsand	3	6	1
2	(Spain) E Sánchez	6	2	6

Second round
(Spain) C Costa	6	6
(Ecuador) A Gómez	2	4
(Argentina) H de la Peña	7^{7}	6
3	(Czech Republic) K Nováček	6^{3}	2
(France) F Fontang	7^{7}	2	7^{9}
(Spain) G López	6^{4}	6	6^{7}
(Italy) R Furlan	1	3
2	(Spain) E Sánchez	6	6

Quarterfinals
(Spain) C Costa	6	6
(Argentina) H de la Peña	4	1
(France) F Fontang	6^{5}	6^{4}
2	(Spain) E Sánchez	7^{7}	7^{7}

Semifinals
(Spain) C Costa	4	7^{7}	7^{7}
2	(Spain) E Sánchez	6	6^{5}	6^{5}
