= 1992 Philips Open =

- Date: 13–19 April
- Edition: 21st
- Category: ATP World Series
- Draw: 32S / 16D
- Prize money: $235,000
- Surface: Clay / outdoor
- Location: Nice, France
- Venue: Nice Lawn Tennis Club

Champions

Singles
- (Argentina) Gabriel Markus

Doubles
- (United States) Patrick Galbraith / (United States) Scott Melville
- Open de Nice Côte d'Azur

The 1992 Philips Open was a men's tennis tournament played on outdoor clay courts at the Nice Lawn Tennis Club in Nice, France, and was part of the ATP World Series of the 1992 ATP Tour. It was the 21st edition of the tournament and took place from 13 April through 19 April 1992. Unseeded Gabriel Markus, who defeated top-seeded Pete Sampras in the semifinal, won the singles title.

== Finals ==
=== Singles ===
(Argentina) Gabriel Markus defeated (Spain) Javier Sánchez 6–4, 6–4

- It was Markus' only singles title of his career.

=== Doubles ===
(United States) Patrick Galbraith / (United States) Scott Melville defeated (South Africa) Pieter Aldrich / (South Africa) Danie Visser 6–1, 3–6, 6–4
