= 1992 Rado Swiss Open =

- Date: 6–13 July
- Edition: 47th
- Category: World Series
- Draw: 32S / 16D
- Prize money: $300,000
- Surface: Clay / outdoor
- Location: Gstaad, Switzerland
- Venue: Roy Emerson Arena

Champions

Singles
- (Spain) Sergi Bruguera

Doubles
- (Netherlands) Hendrik Jan Davids / (Belgium) Libor Pimek
- Suisse Open Gstaad

The 1992 Rado Swiss Open, also known as Suisse Open Gstaad, was an men's professional tennis tournament played on outdoor clay courts at the Roy Emerson Arena in Gstaad, Switzerland that was part of the World Series category of the 1992 ATP Tour. It was the 47th edition of the tournament and was held from 6 July until 13 July 1992. Sixth-seeded Sergi Bruguera won the singles title.

== Finals ==
=== Singles ===
(Spain) Sergi Bruguera defeated (Spain) Francisco Clavet 6–1, 6–4

- It was Bruguera's 2nd and last singles title of the year and the 5th of his career.

=== Doubles ===
(Netherlands) Hendrik Jan Davids / (Belgium) Libor Pimek defeated (Czech Republic) Petr Korda / (Czech Republic) Cyril Suk w/o

- It was Davids' 2nd and last doubles title of the year and the 4th of his career. It was Pimek's 2nd and last doubles title of the year and the 8th of his career.
