= 1992 Salem Open – Doubles =

Doubles
- 1992 Salem Open

Final
- Champions: (United States) Brad Gilbert (United States) Jim Grabb
- Runners-up: (Zimbabwe) Byron Black (South Africa) Byron Talbot
- Score: 6–2, 6–1

Details
- Draw: 16 (1WC/1Q)
- Seeds: 4

Events
Singles	Doubles
- Hong Kong Open

Patrick Galbraith and Todd Witsken were the defending champions, but none competed this year. Galbraith chose to compete at Nice during the same week, while Witsken chose to compete at Tampa instead.

Brad Gilbert and Jim Grabb won the title by defeating Byron Black and Byron Talbot 6–2, 6–1 in the final.

== Seeds ==
1. (Canada) Grant Connell / (Canada) Glenn Michibata (quarterfinals)
2. (Netherlands) Jan Siemerink / (Australia) Todd Woodbridge (first round)
3. (United States) Kent Kinnear / (United States) Sven Salumaa (first round)
4. (United States) Kevin Curren / (South Africa) Gary Muller (quarterfinals)

== Draw ==
Key

- Q = Qualifier
- WC = Wild card
- LL = Lucky loser
- Alt = Alternate
- ITF = ITF entry
- PR = Protected ranking
- SR = Special ranking
- SE = Special exempt
- JE = Junior exempt
- JR = Junior Accelerator Programme entrant
- CO = College Accelerator Programme entrant
- NG = Next Gen Accelerator Program entrant
- w/o = Walkover
- r = Retired
- d = Defaulted

=== Draw ===
First round
1	(Canada) G Connell (Canada) G Michibata	6	7
(United States) T Nelson (United States) B Pearce	2	6
(Australia) M Kratzmann (Australia) W Masur	6	6	7
Q	(Germany) P Kühnen (Germany) A Mronz	7	2	6
4	(United States) K Curren (South Africa) G Muller	6	5	6
(Czechoslovakia) M Damm (Australia) S Stolle	3	7	4
(Zimbabwe) B Black (South Africa) B Talbot	7	6
(United States) D Eisenman (Italy) G Pozzi	5	3
(United Kingdom) J Bates (United Kingdom) N Broad	6	2
(United States) B Gilbert (United States) J Grabb	7	6
(Australia) N Borwick (Australia) S Youl	6	5	7
3	(United States) K Kinnear (United States) S Salumaa	1	7	6
WC	(Hong Kong) Colin Grant (Hong Kong) M Walker	4	3
(Australia) B Dyke (Nigeria) N Odizor	6	6
(Netherlands) P Haarhuis (Netherlands) M Schapers	6	7
2	(Netherlands) J Siemerink (Australia) T Woodbridge	2	5

Quarterfinals
1	(Canada) G Connell (Canada) G Michibata	3	4
(Australia) M Kratzmann (Australia) W Masur	6	6
4	(United States) K Curren (South Africa) G Muller	6^{r}
(Zimbabwe) B Black (South Africa) B Talbot	6
(United States) B Gilbert (United States) J Grabb	7	1	6
(Australia) N Borwick (Australia) S Youl	6	6	0
(Australia) B Dyke (Nigeria) N Odizor	3	2
(Netherlands) P Haarhuis (Netherlands) M Schapers	6	6

Semifinals
(Australia) M Kratzmann (Australia) W Masur	4	6	6
(Zimbabwe) B Black (South Africa) B Talbot	6	0	7
(United States) B Gilbert (United States) J Grabb	6	6
(Netherlands) P Haarhuis (Netherlands) M Schapers	4	4

Final
(Zimbabwe) B Black (South Africa) B Talbot	2	1
(United States) B Gilbert (United States) J Grabb	6	6
