= 1992 Pacific Cup International =

- Date: 19–25 October
- Edition: 9th
- Category: World Series
- Draw: 32S / 16D
- Prize money: $270,000
- Surface: Carpet / indoor
- Location: Taipei, Taiwan
- Venue: Linkou Sports Center

Champions

Singles
- (United States) Jim Grabb

Doubles
- (Australia) John Fitzgerald / (Australia) Sandon Stolle
← 1984 ·	Taipei Grand Prix

The 1992 Pacific Cup International was a men's tennis tournament played on indoor carpet courts at the Linkou Sports Center in Taipei, Taiwan that was part of the World Series 1992 ATP Tour. It was the ninth and last edition of the tournament and was held from 19 October through 25 October 1992. Third-seeded Jim Grabb won the singles title.

== Finals ==
=== Singles ===
(United States) Jim Grabb defeated (Australia) Jamie Morgan 6–3, 6–3

- It was Grabb's only singles title of the year and the 2nd of his career.

=== Doubles ===
(Australia) John Fitzgerald / (Australia) Sandon Stolle defeated (South Africa) Christo van Rensburg / (Germany) Patrick Baur 7–6, 6–2
