= Javier Molina (tennis) =

Spanish tennis player (born 1970)

- Full name: Javier Molina-Peiro
- Country (sports): Spain
- Born: 14 March 1970 (age 55); Zaragoza, Spain
- Height: 5 ft 10 in (178 cm)
- Plays: Right-handed
- Prize money: $11,294

Singles
- Career record: 1–1
- Highest ranking: No. 278 (5 October 1992)

Doubles
- Highest ranking: No. 448 (13 July 1992)

Javier Molina-Peiro (born 14 March 1970) is a Spanish former professional tennis player.

A right-handed player from Zaragoza, Molina turned professional in 1991.

His only ATP Tour main draw appearance came as a qualifier at the 1992 Estoril Open, where he reached the second round with a win over Ronald Agenor. He lost his second round match to Ivan Lendl in three sets, having won the first.
