= 1992 Philips Open – Singles =

Singles
- 1992 Philips Open

Final
- Champion: (Argentina) Gabriel Markus
- Runner-up: (Spain) Javier Sánchez
- Score: 6–4, 6–4

Details
- Draw: 32 (3WC/4Q/1LL)
- Seeds: 8

Events
Singles	Doubles
- Open de Nice Côte d'Azur

Martín Jaite was the defending champion, but lost in the first round to Pete Sampras.

Gabriel Markus won the title by defeating Javier Sánchez 6–4, 6–4 in the final.

== Seeds ==
1. (United States) Pete Sampras (semifinals)
2. (France) Guy Forget (quarterfinals)
3. (Commonwealth of Independent States) Andrei Chesnokov (first round)
4. (Commonwealth of Independent States) Andrei Cherkasov (first round)
5. (Spain) Jordi Arrese (first round)
6. (Spain) Francisco Clavet (second round)
7. (Spain) Javier Sánchez (final)
8. (n/a)

== Draw ==
Key

- Q = Qualifier
- WC = Wild card
- LL = Lucky loser
- Alt = Alternate
- ITF = ITF entry
- PR = Protected ranking
- SR = Special ranking
- SE = Special exempt
- JE = Junior exempt
- JR = Junior Accelerator Programme entrant
- CO = College Accelerator Programme entrant
- NG = Next Gen Accelerator Program entrant
- w/o = Walkover
- r = Retired
- d = Defaulted

=== Finals ===
Semifinals
1	(United States) Pete Sampras	1	6	6^{5}
(Argentina) Gabriel Markus	6	2	7^{7}
(France) Fabrice Santoro	3	6^{3}
7	(Spain) Javier Sánchez	6	7^{7}

Final
(Argentina) Gabriel Markus	6	6
7	(Spain) Javier Sánchez	4	4

=== Top half ===
First round
1	(United States) P Sampras	2	7	6
(Argentina) M Jaite	6	5	3
(Ecuador) A Gómez	6	3	7^{7}
(France) F Fontang	1	6	6^{5}
(Spain) T Carbonell	5	6	6
(Italy) R Furlan	7	4	3
WC	(France) H Leconte	6	2	6
LL	(Belgium) B Wuyts	1	6	0
4	(Commonwealth of Independent States) A Cherkasov	4	1
(France) T Champion	6	6
(Switzerland) M Rosset	7	7
(Argentina) C Miniussi	5	5
(France) C Pioline	2	3
WC	(France) R Gilbert	6	6
(Argentina) G Markus	6	6
5	(Spain) J Arrese	4	2

Second round
1	(United States) P Sampras	7^{7}	7
(Ecuador) A Gómez	6^{5}	5
(Spain) T Carbonell	3	1
WC	(France) H Leconte	6	6
(France) T Champion	3	7	7
(Switzerland) M Rosset	6	5	6
WC	(France) R Gilbert	6	5
(Argentina) G Markus	7	7

Quarterfinals
1	(United States) P Sampras	6	1	6
WC	(France) H Leconte	4	6	3
(France) T Champion	5	4
(Argentina) G Markus	7	6

Semifinals
1	(United States) P Sampras	1	6	6^{5}
(Argentina) G Markus	6	2	7^{7}

=== Bottom half ===
First round
6	(Spain) F Clavet	6	2	6
(Brazil) J Oncins	4	6	1
(Sweden) M Larsson	3	6	6
(Haiti) R Agénor	6	3	2
(France) O Delaître	7	6
WC	(Sweden) B Borg	5	2
(France) F Santoro	6	0	6
3	(Commonwealth of Independent States) A Chesnokov	3	6	3
7	(Spain) J Sánchez	2	6	6
Q	(Netherlands) M Koevermans	6	4	2
Q	(Sweden) N Kulti	6	6
Q	(Sweden) T Enqvist	2	4
(Spain) G López	6	6
(France) A Boetsch	4	2
Q	(Czechoslovakia) L Němeček	4	3
2	(France) G Forget	6	6

Second round
6	(Spain) F Clavet	6	2	5
(Sweden) M Larsson	1	6	7
(France) O Delaître	6^{3}	5
(France) F Santoro	7^{7}	7
7	(Spain) J Sánchez	6	6
Q	(Sweden) N Kulti	1	2
(Spain) G López	2	3
2	(France) G Forget	6	6

Quarterfinals
(Sweden) M Larsson	1	6^{3}
(France) F Santoro	6	7^{7}
7	(Spain) J Sánchez	7^{7}	6
2	(France) G Forget	6^{1}	4

Semifinals
(France) F Santoro	3	6^{3}
7	(Spain) J Sánchez	6	7^{7}
