= 1992 Estoril Open =

- Date: 30 March – 6 April
- Edition: 3rd
- Category: World Series
- Draw: 32S / 16D
- Prize money: $465,000
- Surface: Clay / outdoor
- Location: Oeiras, Portugal
- Venue: Estoril Court Central

Champions

Singles
- (Spain) Carlos Costa

Doubles
- (Netherlands) Hendrik Jan Davids / (Belgium) Libor Pimek
- Estoril Open

The 1992 Estoril Open was a men's tennis tournament played on outdoor clay courts. This event was the 3rd edition of the Estoril Open, included in the 1992 ATP Tour World Series. The event took place at the Estoril Court Central, in Oeiras, Portugal, from 30 March through 6 April 1992. Unseeded Carlos Costa won the singles title.

== Finals ==
=== Singles ===
(Spain) Carlos Costa defeated (Spain) Sergi Bruguera 4–6, 6–2, 6–2

- It was Costa's 1st singles title of his career.

=== Doubles ===
(Netherlands) Hendrik Jan Davids / (Belgium) Libor Pimek defeated (United States) Luke Jensen / (Australia) Laurie Warder 3–6, 6–3, 7–5

- It was Davids' 1st title of the year and 3rd of his career. It was Pimek's 1st title of the year and 7th of his career.
