= 1992 Muratti Time Indoor – Singles =

Singles
- 1992 Muratti Time Indoor

Final
- Champion: (Italy) Omar Camporese
- Runner-up: (Croatia) Goran Ivanišević
- Score: 3–6, 6–3, 6–4

Details
- Draw: 32 (3WC/4Q)
- Seeds: 8

Events
Singles	Doubles
- Milan Indoor

Alexander Volkov was the defending champion, but lost in second round to Andrei Cherkasov.

Omar Camporese won the title by defeating Goran Ivanišević 3–6, 6–3, 6–4 in the final.

== Seeds ==
1. (United States) Ivan Lendl (first round)
2. (France) Guy Forget (second round)
3. (Spain) Emilio Sánchez (second round)
4. (Czechoslovakia) Petr Korda (second round)
5. (Czechoslovakia) Karel Nováček (first round)
6. (United States) Andre Agassi (first round)
7. (Spain) Sergi Bruguera (second round)
8. (Croatia) Goran Ivanišević (final)

== Draw ==
Key

- Q = Qualifier
- WC = Wild card
- LL = Lucky loser
- Alt = Alternate
- ITF = ITF entry
- PR = Protected ranking
- SR = Special ranking
- SE = Special exempt
- JE = Junior exempt
- JR = Junior Accelerator Programme entrant
- CO = College Accelerator Programme entrant
- NG = Next Gen Accelerator Program entrant
- w/o = Walkover
- r = Retired
- d = Defaulted

=== Finals ===
Semifinals
(Italy) Omar Camporese	6	4	6
(Commonwealth of Independent States) Andrei Cherkasov	3	6	3
(Italy) Stefano Pescosolido	2	2
8	(Croatia) Goran Ivanišević	6	6

Final
(Italy) Omar Camporese	3	6	6
8	(Croatia) Goran Ivanišević	6	3	4

=== Top half ===
First round
1	(United States) I Lendl	4	6	6^{7}
Q	(Germany) A Thoms	6	3	7^{9}
Q	(Netherlands) T Nijssen	7	5	5
(Italy) O Camporese	5	7	7
(Spain) C Costa	5	6	6^{5}
(Spain) J Sánchez	7	3	7^{7}
(France) A Boetsch	4	2
7	(Spain) S Bruguera	6	6
4	(Czechoslovakia) P Korda	7	6
WC	(South Africa) W Ferreira	5	3
(Italy) C Caratti	2	4
(Croatia) G Prpić	6	6
(Commonwealth of Independent States) A Cherkasov	6	6
(Italy) R Furlan	2	2
(Commonwealth of Independent States) A Volkov	7^{7}	7^{10}
5	(Czechoslovakia) K Nováček	6^{2}	6^{8}

Second round
Q	(Germany) A Thoms	6^{6}	6	6^{3}
(Italy) O Camporese	7^{8}	4	7^{7}
(Spain) J Sánchez	0	6	6
7	(Spain) S Bruguera	6	0	2
4	(Czechoslovakia) P Korda	6^{1}	1
(Croatia) G Prpić	7^{7}	6
(Commonwealth of Independent States) A Cherkasov	7^{11}	7
(Commonwealth of Independent States) A Volkov	6^{9}	5

Quarterfinals
(Italy) O Camporese	6	6
(Spain) J Sánchez	3	4
(Croatia) G Prpić	2	6	3
(Commonwealth of Independent States) A Cherkasov	6	4	6

Semifinals
(Italy) O Camporese	6	4	6
(Commonwealth of Independent States) A Cherkasov	3	6	3

=== Bottom half ===
First round
6	(United States) A Agassi	2	1
WC	(Switzerland) J Hlasek	6	6
(France) C Pioline	7	4	6^{3}
Q	(Italy) G Pozzi	5	6	7^{7}
(Italy) S Pescosolido	6	6
(Spain) J Arrese	3	1
(Sweden) J Svensson	4	1
3	(Spain) E Sánchez	6	6
8	(Croatia) G Ivanišević	7^{8}	5	6
(Sweden) M Larsson	6^{6}	7	4
(Commonwealth of Independent States) P Haarhuis	4	7	6
Q	(Commonwealth of Independent States) A Olhovskiy	6	5	4
(Germany) M Zoecke	4	7^{7}	2
(United States) P McEnroe	6	6^{5}	6
(Israel) A Mansdorf	3	4
2/WC	(France) G Forget	6	6

Second round
WC	(Switzerland) J Hlasek	3	2
Q	(Italy) G Pozzi	6	6
(Italy) S Pescosolido	6	3	6
3	(Spain) E Sánchez	4	6	3
8	(Croatia) G Ivanišević	6	6
(Commonwealth of Independent States) P Haarhuis	4	3
(United States) P McEnroe	7^{7}	2	7^{7}
2/WC	(France) G Forget	6^{4}	6	6^{4}

Quarterfinals
Q	(Italy) G Pozzi	2	2
(Italy) S Pescosolido	6	6
8	(Croatia) G Ivanišević	6	6
(United States) P McEnroe	3	4

Semifinals
(Italy) S Pescosolido	2	2
8	(Croatia) G Ivanišević	6	6
