= 1992 Banespa Open – Singles =

Singles
- 1992 Banespa Open

Final
- Champion: (Brazil) Luiz Mattar
- Runner-up: (Brazil) Jaime Oncins
- Score: 6–1, 6–4

Details
- Draw: 32 (3WC/4Q)
- Seeds: 8

Events
Singles	Doubles
- ATP São Paulo

Christian Miniussi was the defending champion, but lost in the first round to Àlex Corretja.

Luiz Mattar won the title by defeating Jaime Oncins 6–1, 6–4 in the final.

== Seeds ==
1. (Argentina) Alberto Mancini (semifinals)
2. (Peru) Jaime Yzaga (semifinals)
3. (Uruguay) Marcelo Filippini (first round)
4. (Mexico) Luis Herrera (first round)
5. (Brazil) Jaime Oncins (final)
6. (Brazil) Luiz Mattar (champion)
7. (Spain) Francisco Roig (first round)
8. (Argentina) Christian Miniussi (first round)

== Draw ==
Key

- Q = Qualifier
- WC = Wild card
- LL = Lucky loser
- Alt = Alternate
- ITF = ITF entry
- PR = Protected ranking
- SR = Special ranking
- SE = Special exempt
- JE = Junior exempt
- JR = Junior Accelerator Programme entrant
- CO = College Accelerator Programme entrant
- NG = Next Gen Accelerator Program entrant
- w/o = Walkover
- r = Retired
- d = Defaulted

=== Finals ===
Semifinals
1	(Argentina) Alberto Mancini	3	3
5	(Brazil) Jaime Oncins	6	6
6	(Brazil) Luiz Mattar	7^{7}	6
2	(Peru) Jaime Yzaga	6^{4}	2

Final
5	(Brazil) Jaime Oncins	1	4
6	(Brazil) Luiz Mattar	6	6

=== Top half ===
First round
1	(Argentina) A Mancini	7^{7}	7^{7}
Q	(Sweden) C Allgårdh	6^{5}	6^{5}
Q	(Germany) C Arriens	6	6
(Brazil) C Motta	4	3
Q	(Australia) C Limberger	6	4	6^{1}
(Argentina) M Stringari	4	6	7^{7}
WC	(Brazil) F Roese	6	6
7	(Spain) F Roig	3	4
4	(Mexico) L Herrera	2	6	6^{2}
(Spain) A Berasategui	6	4	7^{7}
WC	(Argentina) M Jaite	7^{7}	4	7
(Uruguay) D Pérez	6^{5}	6	5
(Germany) MK Goellner	3	4
(Argentina) J Frana	6	6
(Argentina) R Azar	1	4
5	(Brazil) J Oncins	6	6

Second round
1	(Argentina) A Mancini	7^{7}	6
Q	(Germany) C Arriens	6^{2}	4
(Argentina) M Stringari	6^{4}	1
WC	(Brazil) F Roese	7^{7}	6
(Spain) A Berasategui	2	7^{7}	3
WC	(Argentina) M Jaite	6	6^{1}	6
(Argentina) J Frana	3	6	4
5	(Brazil) J Oncins	6	4	6

Quarterfinals
1	(Argentina) A Mancini	6	4	6
WC	(Brazil) F Roese	3	6	3
WC	(Argentina) M Jaite	4	2
5	(Brazil) J Oncins	6	6

Semifinals
1	(Argentina) A Mancini	3	3
5	(Brazil) J Oncins	6	6

=== Bottom half ===
First round
6	(Brazil) L Mattar	6	7
(Germany) L Koslowski	3	5
(Chile) S Cortés	6	6^{2}	4
WC	(Brazil) D Marcelino	4	7^{7}	6
(United States) C Adams	6	7
(Spain) JF Altur	1	5
(United States) F Montana	6	6
3	(Uruguay) M Filippini	0	1
8	(Argentina) C Miniussi	2	2
(Spain) À Corretja	6	6
(Germany) P Baur	6	6
(Ecuador) R Viver	1	3
Q	(Brazil) F Meligeni	6^{3}	7	6
(Portugal) J Conha e Silva	7^{7}	5	1
(Spain) G López	7^{8}	6^{5}	0
2	(Peru) J Yzaga	6^{6}	7^{7}	6

Second round
6	(Brazil) L Mattar	7^{7}	7^{7}
WC	(Brazil) D Marcelino	6^{3}	6^{4}
(United States) C Adams	7^{8}	7^{7}
(United States) F Montana	6^{6}	6^{2}
(Spain) À Corretja	5	4
(Germany) P Baur	7	6
Q	(Brazil) F Meligeni	5	4
2	(Peru) J Yzaga	7	6

Quarterfinals
6	(Brazil) L Mattar	3	7^{7}	6
(United States) C Adams	6	6^{4}	2
(Germany) P Baur	6^{5}	6^{8}
2	(Peru) J Yzaga	7^{7}	7^{10}

Semifinals
6	(Brazil) L Mattar	7^{7}	6
2	(Peru) J Yzaga	6^{4}	2
