= 1992 Banespa Open – Doubles =

Doubles
- 1992 Banespa Open

Final
- Champions: (Uruguay) Diego Pérez (Spain) Francisco Roig
- Runners-up: (Sweden) Christer Allgårdh (Australia) Carl Limberger
- Score: 6–2, 7–6

Details
- Draw: 16 (2WC/1Q)
- Seeds: 4

Events
Singles	Doubles
- ATP São Paulo

Andrés Gómez and Jaime Oncins were the defending champions, but none competed this year. Oncins chose to focus only on the singles tournament, finishing as runner-up.

Diego Pérez and Francisco Roig won the title by defeating Christer Allgårdh and Carl Limberger 6–2, 7–6 in the final.

== Seeds ==
1. (Argentina) Pablo Albano / (Brazil) Cássio Motta (first round)
2. (Argentina) Javier Frana / (Argentina) Christian Miniussi (first round)
3. (Sweden) Christer Allgårdh / (Australia) Carl Limberger (final)
4. (South Africa) Royce Deppe / (United States) Doug Eisenman (semifinals)

== Draw ==
Key

- Q = Qualifier
- WC = Wild card
- LL = Lucky loser
- Alt = Alternate
- ITF = ITF entry
- PR = Protected ranking
- SR = Special ranking
- SE = Special exempt
- JE = Junior exempt
- JR = Junior Accelerator Programme entrant
- CO = College Accelerator Programme entrant
- NG = Next Gen Accelerator Program entrant
- w/o = Walkover
- r = Retired
- d = Defaulted

=== Draw ===
First round
1	(Argentina) P Albano (Brazil) C Motta	5	6	4
(Brazil) R Acioly (Brazil) F Roese	7	3	6
(United States) T Nelson (Argentina) D Orsanic	6	6	2
Q	(Brazil) A Hocevar (Brazil) C Kist	2	7	6
3	(Sweden) C Allgårdh (Australia) C Limberger	6	6
(Uruguay) M Filippini (Germany) MK Goellner	4	2
(United States) M Bauer (Portugal) J Cunha e Silva	3	2
(United States) M Keil (United States) T Mercer	6	6
WC	(Brazil) J Daher (Brazil) M Menezes	4	3
WC	(Argentina) M Jaite (Brazil) D Marcelino	6	6
(Brazil) N Aerts (Argentina) L Lobo	3	4
4	(South Africa) R Deppe (United States) D Eisenman	6	6
(Uruguay) D Pérez (Spain) F Roig	2	6	6
(Venezuela) M Ruah (Cuba) M Tabares	6	1	3
(Germany) P Baur (United States) F Montana	6	6	6
2	(Argentina) J Frana (Argentina) C Miniussi	7	4	4

Quarterfinals
(Brazil) R Acioly (Brazil) F Roese	6	6
Q	(Brazil) A Hocevar (Brazil) C Kist	3	4
3	(Sweden) C Allgårdh (Australia) C Limberger	6	6
(United States) M Keil (United States) T Mercer	3	4
WC	(Argentina) M Jaite (Brazil) D Marcelino	4	7	3
4	(South Africa) R Deppe (United States) D Eisenman	6	6	6
(Uruguay) D Pérez (Spain) F Roig	6	5	4
(Germany) P Baur (United States) F Montana	3	7	0^{r}

Semifinals
(Brazil) R Acioly (Brazil) F Roese	6	4
3	(Sweden) C Allgårdh (Australia) C Limberger	7	6
4	(South Africa) R Deppe (United States) D Eisenman	6	6	4
(Uruguay) D Pérez (Spain) F Roig	7	3	6

Final
3	(Sweden) C Allgårdh (Australia) C Limberger	2	6
(Uruguay) D Pérez (Spain) F Roig	6	7
