= 1992 Muratti Time Indoor – Doubles =

Doubles
- 1992 Muratti Time Indoor

Final
- Champions: (United Kingdom) Neil Broad (Australia) David Macpherson
- Runners-up: (Spain) Sergio Casal (Spain) Emilio Sánchez
- Score: 5–7, 7–5, 6–4

Details
- Draw: 16 (2WC/1Q)
- Seeds: 4

Events
Singles	Doubles
← 1991 ·	Milan Indoor	· 1993 →

Omar Camporese and Goran Ivanišević were the defending champions but withdrew on the semifinals in order to focus on the singles tournament, in which both players reached the Final.

Neil Broad and David Macpherson won the title by defeating Sergio Casal and Emilio Sánchez 5–7, 7–5, 6–4 in the final.

== Seeds ==
1. (Spain) Sergio Casal / (Spain) Emilio Sánchez (final)
2. (Australia) John Fitzgerald / (United States) Patrick McEnroe (first round)
3. (Netherlands) Tom Nijssen / (Czech Republic) Cyril Suk (quarterfinals)
4. (South Africa) Wayne Ferreira / (South Africa) Piet Norval (quarterfinals)

== Draw ==
=== Key ===
- Q = Qualifier
- WC = Wild card
- LL = Lucky loser
- Alt = Alternate
- SE = Special exempt
- PR = Protected ranking
- ITF = ITF entry
- JE = Junior exempt
- w/o = Walkover
- r = Retired
- d = Defaulted
- SR = Special ranking

=== Draw ===
First round
1	(Spain) S Casal (Spain) E Sánchez	6	6
WC	(Czechoslovakia) P Korda (Czechoslovakia) I Lendl	3	4
Q	(Italy) C Brandi (Italy) U Colombini	6	7
(United States) S Cannon (Australia) L Warder	3	6
4	(South Africa) W Ferreira (South Africa) P Norval	6	6	7
(Italy) D Nargiso (Czech Republic) K Nováček	2	7	6
(Netherlands) HJ Davids (Czechoslovakia) L Pimek	6	7
(United States) J Brown (Spain) J Sánchez	0	5
(Italy) O Camporese (Croatia) G Ivanišević	7	6	6
WC	(United States) A Agassi (United States) L Jensen	5	7	1
(Sweden) R Båthman (Sweden) R Bergh	6	5	1
3	(Netherlands) T Nijssen (Czechoslovakia) C Suk	2	7	6
(United States) C Beckman (Netherlands) P Haarhuis	4	7	5
(United Kingdom) N Broad (Australia) D Macpherson	6	6	7
(Czechoslovakia) V Flégl (United States) S Melville	6	3	6
2	(Australia) J Fitzgerald (United States) P McEnroe	3	6	4

Quarterfinals
1	(Spain) S Casal (Spain) E Sánchez	6	6	7
Q	(Italy) C Brandi (Italy) U Colombini	7	0	6
4	(South Africa) W Ferreira (South Africa) P Norval	3	7	2
(Netherlands) HJ Davids (Czechoslovakia) L Pimek	6	6	6
(Italy) O Camporese (Croatia) G Ivanišević	4	6	6
3	(Netherlands) T Nijssen (Czechoslovakia) C Suk	6	4	4
(United Kingdom) N Broad (Australia) D Macpherson	7	6
(Czechoslovakia) V Flégl (United States) S Melville	6	3

Semifinals
1	(Spain) S Casal (Spain) E Sánchez	4	6	6
(Netherlands) HJ Davids (Czechoslovakia) L Pimek	6	1	2
(Italy) O Camporese (Croatia) G Ivanišević
(United Kingdom) N Broad (Australia) D Macpherson	w	/	o

Final
1	(Spain) S Casal (Spain) E Sánchez	7	5	4
(United Kingdom) N Broad (Australia) D Macpherson	5	7	6
