= 1992 Salem Open – Singles =

Singles
- 1992 Salem Open

Final
- Champion: (United States) Jim Courier
- Runner-up: (United States) Michael Chang
- Score: 7–5, 6–3

Details
- Draw: 32 (3WC/4Q)
- Seeds: 8

Events
Singles	Doubles
- Hong Kong Open

Richard Krajicek was the defending champion, but chose to rest after losing the Tokyo final to Jim Courier.

Courier won the Hong Kong title by defeating Michael Chang 7–5, 6–3 in the final.

== Seeds ==
1. (United States) Jim Courier (champion)
2. (Germany) Michael Stich (second round)
3. (United States) Michael Chang (final)
4. (United States) Brad Gilbert (semifinals)
5. (Netherlands) Paul Haarhuis (first round)
6. (Netherlands) Jan Siemerink (quarterfinals)
7. (Germany) Markus Zoecke (first round)
8. (Sweden) Anders Järryd (first round)

== Draw ==
Key

- Q = Qualifier
- WC = Wild card
- LL = Lucky loser
- Alt = Alternate
- ITF = ITF entry
- PR = Protected ranking
- SR = Special ranking
- SE = Special exempt
- JE = Junior exempt
- JR = Junior Accelerator Programme entrant
- CO = College Accelerator Programme entrant
- NG = Next Gen Accelerator Program entrant
- w/o = Walkover
- r = Retired
- d = Defaulted

=== Finals ===
Semifinals
1	(United States) Jim Courier	6	6
4	(United States) Brad Gilbert	4	1
3	(United States) Michael Chang	6	6^{5}	6
(Australia) Todd Woodbridge	3	7^{7}	1

Final
1	(United States) Jim Courier	7	6
3	(United States) Michael Chang	5	3

=== Top half ===
First round
1	(United States) J Courier	7^{7}	6
(Germany) P Kühnen	6^{5}	4
(Czechoslovakia) M Damm	7	6
WC	(Hong Kong) M Walker	5	3
(South Africa) G Muller	6	6
(Germany) C Saceanu	3	3
Q	(New Zealand) B Steven	7^{7}	6
8	(Sweden) A Järryd	6^{5}	1
4	(United States) B Gilbert	3	7	6
Q	(Australia) N Borwick	6	5	3
(Netherlands) M Schapers	6	6
Q	(Canada) G Rusedski	4	4
(Japan) S Matsuoka	6	6
(Austria) A Antonitsch	3	1
(Australia) W Masur	6	6
5	(Netherlands) P Haarhuis	3	2

Second round
1	(United States) J Courier	6	6
(Czechoslovakia) M Damm	2	1
(South Africa) G Muller	6	6
Q	(New Zealand) B Steven	4	2
4	(United States) B Gilbert	7	6
(Netherlands) M Schapers	5	3
(Japan) S Matsuoka	7^{7}	6
(Australia) W Masur	6^{3}	3

Quarterfinals
1	(United States) J Courier	6	6
(South Africa) G Muller	2	1
4	(United States) B Gilbert	4	7^{7}	6
(Japan) S Matsuoka	6	6^{5}	1

Semifinals
1	(United States) J Courier	6	6
4	(United States) B Gilbert	4	1

=== Bottom half ===
First round
6	(Netherlands) J Siemerink	6	1
(Italy) G Pozzi	4	0^{r}
Q	(Germany) B Karbacher	2	6	6
(Australia) S Youl	6	3	3
(United States) J Grabb	6	3	6
(Zimbabwe) B Black	3	6	2
(Canada) G Connell	5	3
3	(United States) M Chang	7	6
7	(West Germany) M Zoecke	7^{8}	6^{6}	2
(Australia) T Woodbridge	6^{6}	7^{8}	6
WC	(United States) T Ho	2	3
(Germany) P Baur	6	6
(United States) K Curren	6	7
(Germany) A Thoms	4	5
WC	(South Korea) E-j Chang	6^{4}	3
2	(Germany) M Stich	7^{7}	6

Second round
6	(Netherlands) J Siemerink	7	7
Q	(Germany) B Karbacher	5	5
(United States) J Grabb	2	4
3	(United States) M Chang	6	6
(Australia) T Woodbridge	6	6
(Germany) P Baur	4	0
(United States) K Curren	6	6
2	(Germany) M Stich	1	3

Quarterfinals
6	(Netherlands) J Siemerink	3	2
3	(United States) M Chang	6	6
(Australia) T Woodbridge	w/o
(United States) K Curren

Semifinals
3	(United States) M Chang	6	6^{5}	6
(Australia) T Woodbridge	3	7^{7}	1
