= 1992 Estoril Open – Doubles =

Doubles
- 1992 Estoril Open

Final
- Champions: (Netherlands) Hendrik Jan Davids; (Belgium) Libor Pimek
- Runners-up: (United States) Luke Jensen; (Australia) Laurie Warder
- Score: 3–6, 6–3, 7–5

Events
| Singles | Doubles |
- Estoril Open

Paul Haarhuis and Mark Koevermans were the defending champions, but did not participate together this year. Haarhuis did not participate this year. Koevermans partnered David Rikl, losing in the first round.

Hendrik Jan Davids and Libor Pimek won in the final 3–6, 6–3, 7–5, against Luke Jensen and Laurie Warder.

== Seeds ==
1. (United States) Luke Jensen / (Australia) Laurie Warder (final)
2. (Netherlands) Tom Nijssen / (Czechoslovakia) Cyril Suk (quarterfinals)
3. (Spain) Sergio Casal / (Spain) Emilio Sánchez (semifinals)
4. (United States) Steve DeVries / (Australia) David Macpherson (first round)

== Draw ==
Key

- Q = Qualifier
- WC = Wild card
- LL = Lucky loser
- Alt = Alternate
- ITF = ITF entry
- PR = Protected ranking
- SR = Special ranking
- SE = Special exempt
- JE = Junior exempt
- JR = Junior Accelerator Programme entrant
- CO = College Accelerator Programme entrant
- NG = Next Gen Accelerator Program entrant
- w/o = Walkover
- r = Retired
- d = Defaulted

=== Draw ===
First round

Quarterfinals

Semifinals

Final

1
- (United States) L Jensen
- (Australia) L Warder
6
6

- (Brazil) R Acioly
- (South Africa) D Adams
4
4

1
- (United States) L Jensen
- (Australia) L Warder
7
6

WC
- (Czechoslovakia) I Lendl
- (Portugal) N Marques
2
6
6

Q
- (Spain) C Costa
- (Spain) F Clavet
6
4

Q
- (Spain) C Costa
- (Spain) F Clavet
6
2
7

1
- (United States) L Jensen
- (Australia) L Warder
6
6

3
- (Spain) S Casal
- (Spain) E Sánchez
6
7

3
- (Spain) S Casal
- (Spain) E Sánchez
4
3

- (Ecuador) A Gómez
- (Spain) J Sánchez
3
5

3
- (Spain) S Casal
- (Spain) E Sánchez
6
6

WC
- (Portugal) E Couto
- (Portugal) J Cunha e Silva
3
5

- (Czechoslovakia) V Flégl
- (Netherlands) M Oosting
3
2

- (Czechoslovakia) V Flégl
- (Netherlands) M Oosting
6
7

1
- (United States) L Jensen
- (Australia) L Warder
6
3
5

- (Spain) T Carbonell
- (Germany) U Riglewski
6
1
7

- (Netherlands) HJ Davids
- (Belgium) L Pimek
3
6
7

- (Netherlands) J Eltingh
- (Netherlands) T Kempers
2
6
6

- (Spain) T Carbonell
- (Germany) U Riglewski
6
7
4

- (Argentina) G Luza
- (Argentina) C Miniussi
7
6

- (Argentina) G Luza
- (Argentina) C Miniussi
7
5
6

4
- (United States) S DeVries
- (Australia) D Macpherson
6
3

- (Argentina) G Luza
- (Argentina) C Miniussi
7
3
3

- (Netherlands) HJ Davids
- (Belgium) L Pimek
6
7

- (Netherlands) HJ Davids
- (Belgium) L Pimek
5
6
6

- (Netherlands) M Koevermans
- (Czechoslovakia) D Rikl
3
5

- (Netherlands) HJ Davids
- (Belgium) L Pimek
4
6
6

- (United States) C Beckman
- (United States) S Melville
4
3

2
- (Netherlands) T Nijssen
- (Czechoslovakia) C Suk
6
3
1

2
- (Netherlands) T Nijssen
- (Czechoslovakia) C Suk
6
6
