= 1992 Philips Open – Doubles =

Doubles
- 1992 Philips Open

Final
- Champions: (United States) Patrick Galbraith (United States) Scott Melville
- Runners-up: (South Africa) Pieter Aldrich (South Africa) Danie Visser
- Score: 6–1, 3–6, 6–4

Details
- Draw: 16 (2WC/1Q)
- Seeds: 4

Events
| Singles | Doubles |
- Open de Nice Côte d'Azur

Rikard Bergh and Jan Gunnarsson were the defending champions, but Gunnarsson did not compete this year. Bergh teamed up with Ronnie Båthman and lost in the first round to Patrick Galbraith and Scott Melville.

Galbraith and Melville won the title by defeating Pieter Aldrich and Danie Visser 6–1, 3–6, 6–4 in the final.

== Seeds ==
1. (United States) Luke Jensen / (Australia) Laurie Warder (semifinals)
2. (Netherlands) Tom Nijssen / (Czechoslovakia) Cyril Suk (first round)
3. (Netherlands) Hendrik Jan Davids / (Czechoslovakia) Libor Pimek (quarterfinals)
4. (Sweden) Ronnie Båthman / (Sweden) Rikard Bergh (first round)

== Draw ==
Key

- Q = Qualifier
- WC = Wild card
- LL = Lucky loser
- Alt = Alternate
- ITF = ITF entry
- PR = Protected ranking
- SR = Special ranking
- SE = Special exempt
- JE = Junior exempt
- JR = Junior Accelerator Programme entrant
- CO = College Accelerator Programme entrant
- NG = Next Gen Accelerator Program entrant
- w/o = Walkover
- r = Retired
- d = Defaulted

=== Draw ===
First round
1 | (United States) L Jensen (Australia) L Warder | 2 | 7 | 7
(Argentina) G Luza (Argentina) C Miniussi | 6 | 6 | 5
(Brazil) J Oncins (Croatia) G Prpić | 6 | 6
(Ecuador) A Gómez (Spain) J Sánchez | 4 | 1
4 | (Sweden) R Båthman (Sweden) R Bergh | 2 | 6
(United States) P Galbraith (United States) S Melville | 6 | 7
WC | (France) G Forget (France) H Leconte | 6 | 6
(Mexico) J Lozano (Uruguay) D Pérez | 3 | 4
WC | (France) O Delaître (France) R Gilbert | 6 | 7
(Czechoslovakia) V Flégl (Netherlands) M Oosting | 2 | 6
Q | (Spain) JC Báguena (Sweden) M Larsson | 4 | 6 | 5
3 | (Netherlands) HJ Davids (Czechoslovakia) L Pimek | 6 | 1 | 7
(Spain) T Carbonell (Switzerland) M Rosset | 6 | 6 | 1
(South Africa) P Aldrich (South Africa) D Visser | 2 | 7 | 6
(Netherlands) M Koevermans (Brazil) C Motta | 3 | 6 | 6
2 | (Netherlands) T Nijssen (Czechoslovakia) C Suk | 6 | 3 | 2

Quarterfinals
1 | (United States) L Jensen (Australia) L Warder | 6 | 7
(Brazil) J Oncins (Croatia) G Prpić | 2 | 5
(United States) P Galbraith (United States) S Melville | 6 | 6
WC | (France) G Forget (France) H Leconte | 2 | 4
WC | (France) O Delaître (France) R Gilbert | 6 | 0 | 6
3 | (Netherlands) HJ Davids (Czechoslovakia) L Pimek | 3 | 6 | 4
(South Africa) P Aldrich (South Africa) D Visser | 6 | 6
(Netherlands) M Koevermans (Brazil) C Motta | 4 | 4

Semifinals
1 | (United States) L Jensen (Australia) L Warder | 6 | 6 | 3
(United States) P Galbraith (United States) S Melville | 3 | 7 | 6
WC | (France) O Delaître (France) R Gilbert | 3 | 4
(South Africa) P Aldrich (South Africa) D Visser | 6 | 6

Final
(United States) P Galbraith (United States) S Melville | 6 | 3 | 6
(South Africa) P Aldrich (South Africa) D Visser | 1 | 6 | 4
