= 1990 ATP Challenger Series =

Details
- Duration: 15 January 1990 – 23 December 1990
- Edition: 13th
- Tournaments: 71

Achievements (singles)

The ATP Challenger Series is the second-tier tour for professional tennis organised by the Association of Tennis Professionals (ATP). The 1990 ATP Challenger Series calendar comprises 71 tournaments, with prize money ranging from $25,000 up to $100,000.

== Schedule ==
=== January ===
Week of	Tournament	Champions	Runners-up	Semifinalists	Quarterfinalists
January 1	No tournaments scheduled.				
January 8	No tournaments scheduled.				
January 15	Jakarta-1 Challenger; Jakarta, Indonesia $25,000 – clay – 32S/16D; Singles draw – Doubles draw	(Austria) Horst Skoff; 6–2, 4–6, 6–1	(United States) Chris Garner	(United States) Brian Devening (South Korea) Kim Bong-soo	(South Korea) Yoo Jin-Sun (Belgium) Xavier Daufresne (Peru) Pablo Arraya (Austria) Thomas Buchmayer
January 15	Jakarta-1 Challenger; Jakarta, Indonesia $25,000 – clay – 32S/16D; Singles draw – Doubles draw	(United States) Eric Amend (United States) Tom Mercer; 6–4, 6–7, 6–3	(Malaysia) Adam Malik (United States) Joseph Russell	(United States) Brian Devening (South Korea) Kim Bong-soo	(South Korea) Yoo Jin-Sun (Belgium) Xavier Daufresne (Peru) Pablo Arraya (Austria) Thomas Buchmayer
January 22	Intersport Heilbronn Open; Heilbronn, West Germany $50,000 – carpet (I) – 32S/16D; Singles draw – Doubles draw	(Czechoslovakia) Milan Šrejber; 7–6, 4–6, 7–6	(West Germany) Alexander Mronz	(West Germany) Christian Saceanu (United States) Jeff Tarango	(South Africa) Mark Kaplan (France) Olivier Soules (West Germany) Martin Sinner (Sweden) Jörgen Windahl
January 22	Intersport Heilbronn Open; Heilbronn, West Germany $50,000 – carpet (I) – 32S/16D; Singles draw – Doubles draw	(Czechoslovakia) David Rikl (Czechoslovakia) Tomáš Anzari; 7–6, 7–6	(South Africa) Byron Talbot (Sweden) Jörgen Windahl	(West Germany) Christian Saceanu (United States) Jeff Tarango	(South Africa) Mark Kaplan (France) Olivier Soules (West Germany) Martin Sinner (Sweden) Jörgen Windahl
January 29	No tournaments scheduled.				

=== February ===
Week of	Tournament	Champions	Runners-up	Semifinalists	Quarterfinalists
February 5	Telford Challenger (United Kingdom) Telford, Great Britain $50,000 – carpet (I) – 32S/16D; Singles draw – Doubles draw	(France) Fabrice Santoro; 6–3, 5–7, 6–4	(Sweden) Peter Nyborg	(United Kingdom) Andrew Castle (United States) Brian Garrow	(United Kingdom) Chris Bailey (Australia) Simon Youl (West Germany) Patrick Baur (Sweden) Christian Bergström
February 5	Telford Challenger (United Kingdom) Telford, Great Britain $50,000 – carpet (I) – 32S/16D; Singles draw – Doubles draw	(United Kingdom) Nick Brown (United Kingdom) Nick Fulwood; 6–4, 7–5	(Australia) Russell Barlow (West Germany) Martin Sinner	(United Kingdom) Andrew Castle (United States) Brian Garrow	(United Kingdom) Chris Bailey (Australia) Simon Youl (West Germany) Patrick Baur (Sweden) Christian Bergström
February 12	Croydon Challenger (United Kingdom) Croydon, Great Britain $50,000 – carpet (I) – 32S/16D; Singles draw – Doubles draw	(West Germany) Christian Saceanu; 6–3, 6–0	(West Germany) Udo Riglewski	(France) Olivier Soules (Portugal) Nuno Marques	(United States) Robbie Weiss (United Kingdom) Chris Bailey (West Germany) Alexander Mronz (United Kingdom) Nick Brown
February 12	Croydon Challenger (United Kingdom) Croydon, Great Britain $50,000 – carpet (I) – 32S/16D; Singles draw – Doubles draw	(United Kingdom) Andrew Castle (France) Olivier Delaître; 7–6, 6–3	(United Kingdom) Nick Brown (United Kingdom) Nick Fulwood	(France) Olivier Soules (Portugal) Nuno Marques	(United States) Robbie Weiss (United Kingdom) Chris Bailey (West Germany) Alexander Mronz (United Kingdom) Nick Brown
February 12	Nairobi-1 Challenger; Nairobi, Kenya $25,000 – clay – 32S/16D; Singles draw – Doubles draw	(Argentina) Christian Miniussi; 2–6, 6–3, 6–4	(Peru) Pablo Arraya	(United States) Joseph Russell (Netherlands) Menno Oosting	(Austria) Oliver Fuchs (Czechoslovakia) Josef Čihák (West Germany) Sascha Nensel (Italy) Ugo Colombini
February 12	Nairobi-1 Challenger; Nairobi, Kenya $25,000 – clay – 32S/16D; Singles draw – Doubles draw	(Belgium) Eduardo Masso (Argentina) Christian Miniussi; 3–6, 7–5, 7–6	(Portugal) João Cunha e Silva (Netherlands) Menno Oosting	(United States) Joseph Russell (Netherlands) Menno Oosting	(Austria) Oliver Fuchs (Czechoslovakia) Josef Čihák (West Germany) Sascha Nensel (Italy) Ugo Colombini
February 12	São Paulo-1 Challenger; São Paulo, Brazil $50,000 – hard – 32S/16D; Singles draw – Doubles draw	(Puerto Rico) Miguel Nido; 6–3, 6–4	(Brazil) Cássio Motta	(Brazil) Ivan Kley (Brazil) José Daher	(Cuba) Juan Pino (United States) Jeff Tarango (Argentina) Javier Frana (Argentina) Pablo Albano
February 12	São Paulo-1 Challenger; São Paulo, Brazil $50,000 – hard – 32S/16D; Singles draw – Doubles draw	(Argentina) Javier Frana (Argentina) Gustavo Luza; 6–3, 7–6	(Brazil) Ricardo Camargo (Brazil) Ivan Kley	(Brazil) Ivan Kley (Brazil) José Daher	(Cuba) Juan Pino (United States) Jeff Tarango (Argentina) Javier Frana (Argentina) Pablo Albano
February 19	Nairobi-2 Challenger; Nairobi, Kenya $25,000 – clay – 32S/16D; Singles draw – Doubles draw	(Argentina) Christian Miniussi; 6–2, 7–6	(Netherlands) Menno Oosting	(India) Srinivasan Vasudevan (Austria) Thomas Buchmayer	(West Germany) Torben Theine (Czechoslovakia) Cyril Suk (Peru) Pablo Arraya (Portugal) João Cunha e Silva
February 19	Nairobi-2 Challenger; Nairobi, Kenya $25,000 – clay – 32S/16D; Singles draw – Doubles draw	(Portugal) João Cunha e Silva (Belgium) Eduardo Masso; 6–4, 7–5	(India) Zeeshan Ali (Belgium) Libor Pimek	(India) Srinivasan Vasudevan (Austria) Thomas Buchmayer	(West Germany) Torben Theine (Czechoslovakia) Cyril Suk (Peru) Pablo Arraya (Portugal) João Cunha e Silva
February 26	Palm Hills International Tennis Challenger; Cairo, Egypt $100,000 – clay – 32S/16D; Singles draw – Doubles draw	(Austria) Thomas Muster; 6–4, 6–3	(Spain) José Francisco Altur	(Spain) Tomás Carbonell (Spain) Jordi Arrese	(Australia) Simon Youl (Australia) Todd Woodbridge (Portugal) Nuno Marques (Australia) Johan Anderson
February 26	Palm Hills International Tennis Challenger; Cairo, Egypt $100,000 – clay – 32S/16D; Singles draw – Doubles draw	(Czechoslovakia) David Rikl (Czechoslovakia) Tomáš Anzari; 6–3, 6–7, 7–5	(Belgium) Eduardo Masso (Argentina) Christian Miniussi	(Spain) Tomás Carbonell (Spain) Jordi Arrese	(Australia) Simon Youl (Australia) Todd Woodbridge (Portugal) Nuno Marques (Australia) Johan Anderson

=== March ===
Week of	Tournament	Champions	Runners-up	Semifinalists	Quarterfinalists
March 5	Martinique Challenger; Martinique, French West Indies $50,000 – hard – 32S/16D; Singles draw – Doubles draw	(France) Guillaume Raoux; 3–6, 6–3, 6–3	(United States) Robbie Weiss	(Sweden) David Engel (Socialist Federal Republic of Yugoslavia) Bruno Orešar	(Netherlands) Tom Nijssen (Kenya) Paul Wekesa (France) Arnaud Boetsch (Sweden) Johan Carlsson
March 5	Martinique Challenger; Martinique, French West Indies $50,000 – hard – 32S/16D; Singles draw – Doubles draw	(France) Olivier Delaître (France) Guillaume Raoux; 6–3, 7–5	(United States) Todd Nelson (The Bahamas) Roger Smith	(Sweden) David Engel (Socialist Federal Republic of Yugoslavia) Bruno Orešar	(Netherlands) Tom Nijssen (Kenya) Paul Wekesa (France) Arnaud Boetsch (Sweden) Johan Carlsson
March 12	Agadir Challenger; Agadir, Morocco $75,000 – clay – 32S/16D; Singles draw – Doubles draw	(Austria) Thomas Muster; 6–2, 7–5	(Argentina) Guillermo Pérez Roldán	(Australia) Richard Fromberg (Netherlands) Paul Haarhuis	(Argentina) Franco Davín (Netherlands) Mark Koevermans (Argentina) Roberto Azar (Argentina) Christian Miniussi
March 12	Agadir Challenger; Agadir, Morocco $75,000 – clay – 32S/16D; Singles draw – Doubles draw	(Czechoslovakia) Josef Čihák (Czechoslovakia) Cyril Suk; W/O	(Italy) Omar Camporese (Italy) Diego Nargiso	(Australia) Richard Fromberg (Netherlands) Paul Haarhuis	(Argentina) Franco Davín (Netherlands) Mark Koevermans (Argentina) Roberto Azar (Argentina) Christian Miniussi
March 19	No tournaments scheduled.				
March 26	Estoril Challenger; Estoril, Portugal $100,000 – clay – 32S/16D; Singles draw – Doubles draw	(France) Thierry Tulasne; 6–2, 2–3, retired	(Argentina) Christian Miniussi	(Sweden) Lars Jönsson (Portugal) Nuno Marques	(France) Fabrice Santoro (Australia) Richard Fromberg (West Germany) Udo Riglewski (Spain) Fernando Luna
March 26	Estoril Challenger; Estoril, Portugal $100,000 – clay – 32S/16D; Singles draw – Doubles draw	(West Germany) Karsten Braasch (Netherlands) Hendrik Jan Davids; 5–7, 7–5, 6–2	(Spain) Tomás Carbonell (West Germany) Udo Riglewski	(Sweden) Lars Jönsson (Portugal) Nuno Marques	(France) Fabrice Santoro (Australia) Richard Fromberg (West Germany) Udo Riglewski (Spain) Fernando Luna
March 26	Jerusalem Challenger; Jerusalem, Israel $50,000 – hard – 32S/16D; Singles draw – Doubles draw	(Israel) Raviv Weidenfeld; 5–7, 6–4, 7–6	(Israel) Shahar Perkiss	(West Germany) Martin Sinner (Italy) Cristiano Caratti	(Israel) Gilad Bloom (West Germany) Christian Geyer (South Africa) Mark Kaplan (West Germany) Christian Saceanu
March 26	Jerusalem Challenger; Jerusalem, Israel $50,000 – hard – 32S/16D; Singles draw – Doubles draw	(Sweden) Henrik Holm (Sweden) Peter Nyborg; 6–1, 2–6, 6–3	(Italy) Cristian Brandi (Italy) Cristiano Caratti	(West Germany) Martin Sinner (Italy) Cristiano Caratti	(Israel) Gilad Bloom (West Germany) Christian Geyer (South Africa) Mark Kaplan (West Germany) Christian Saceanu

=== April ===
Week of	Tournament	Champions	Runners-up	Semifinalists	Quarterfinalists
April 2	Zaragoza Challenger; Zaragoza, Spain $50,000 – clay (I) – 32S/16D; Singles draw – Doubles draw	(Spain) Carlos Costa; 6–3, 6–4	(Italy) Francesco Cancellotti	(Italy) Stefano Pescosolido (Spain) José Francisco Altur	(Finland) Aki Rahunen (Spain) Francisco Roig (Italy) Claudio Pistolesi (Italy) Diego Nargiso
April 2	Zaragoza Challenger; Zaragoza, Spain $50,000 – clay (I) – 32S/16D; Singles draw – Doubles draw	(Czechoslovakia) David Rikl (Czechoslovakia) Tomáš Anzari; 6–3, 7–6	(Spain) Carlos Costa (Spain) Francisco Roig	(Italy) Stefano Pescosolido (Spain) José Francisco Altur	(Finland) Aki Rahunen (Spain) Francisco Roig (Italy) Claudio Pistolesi (Italy) Diego Nargiso
April 9	Brasília-1 Challenger; Brasília, Brazil $100,000 – carpet – 32S/16D; Singles draw – Doubles draw	(France) Olivier Delaître; 7–6, 6–1	(United States) Brian Garrow	(West Germany) Patrick Baur (Italy) Gianluca Pozzi	(Italy) Simone Colombo (Canada) Chris Pridham (Brazil) Nelson Aerts (Brazil) Cássio Motta
April 9	Brasília-1 Challenger; Brasília, Brazil $100,000 – carpet – 32S/16D; Singles draw – Doubles draw	(Brazil) Nelson Aerts (Brazil) Fernando Roese; 6–3, 7–5	(Italy) Simone Colombo (Brazil) César Kist	(West Germany) Patrick Baur (Italy) Gianluca Pozzi	(Italy) Simone Colombo (Canada) Chris Pridham (Brazil) Nelson Aerts (Brazil) Cássio Motta
April 9	Cape Town Challenger; Cape Town, South Africa $100,000 – hard (I) – 32S/16D; Singles draw – Doubles draw	(South Africa) Gary Muller; 5–7, 6–2, 6–3	(United Kingdom) Jeremy Bates	(Australia) Neil Borwick (Australia) Darren Cahill	(West Germany) Christian Geyer (South Africa) Pieter Aldrich (United States) Johan Kriek (South Africa) Danie Visser
April 9	Cape Town Challenger; Cape Town, South Africa $100,000 – hard (I) – 32S/16D; Singles draw – Doubles draw	(United Kingdom) Jeremy Bates (South Africa) Marius Barnard; 6–3, 6–1	(South Africa) Wayne Ferreira (South Africa) Piet Norval	(Australia) Neil Borwick (Australia) Darren Cahill	(West Germany) Christian Geyer (South Africa) Pieter Aldrich (United States) Johan Kriek (South Africa) Danie Visser
April 9	Parioli Challenger; Rome, Italy $50,000 – clay – 32S/16D; Singles draw – Doubles draw	(Spain) Fernando Luna; 6–3, 4–6, 6–4	(Sweden) Magnus Larsson	(Argentina) Christian Miniussi (Sweden) David Engel	(Czechoslovakia) Branislav Stankovič (Sweden) Nicklas Kulti (Italy) Stefano Pescosolido (Sweden) Thomas Haldin
April 9	Parioli Challenger; Rome, Italy $50,000 – clay – 32S/16D; Singles draw – Doubles draw	(Czechoslovakia) Branislav Stankovič (Czechoslovakia) Richard Vogel; 7–5, 6–3	(Italy) Nicola Bruno (Italy) Stefano Pescosolido	(Argentina) Christian Miniussi (Sweden) David Engel	(Czechoslovakia) Branislav Stankovič (Sweden) Nicklas Kulti (Italy) Stefano Pescosolido (Sweden) Thomas Haldin
April 9	San Luis Potosí Challenger; San Luis Potosí, Mexico $100,000 – clay – 32S/16D; Singles draw – Doubles draw	(West Germany) Ricki Osterthun; 6–4, 6–4	(United States) MaliVai Washington	(Mexico) Leonardo Lavalle (United States) Philip Johnson	(Sweden) Christian Bergström (Netherlands) Hendrik Jan Davids (United States) Scott Warner (Australia) Carl Limberger
April 9	San Luis Potosí Challenger; San Luis Potosí, Mexico $100,000 – clay – 32S/16D; Singles draw – Doubles draw	(Mexico) Leonardo Lavalle (Mexico) Jorge Lozano; 5–7, 6–3, 6–2	(Mexico) Luis Herrera (Mexico) Fernando Pérez Pascal	(Mexico) Leonardo Lavalle (United States) Philip Johnson	(Sweden) Christian Bergström (Netherlands) Hendrik Jan Davids (United States) Scott Warner (Australia) Carl Limberger
April 16	Durban Challenger; Durban, South Africa $50,000 – hard – 32S/16D; Singles draw – Doubles draw	(United Kingdom) Jeremy Bates; 6–4, 6–1	(South Africa) Grant Stafford	(South Africa) Stefan Kruger (United States) Robbie Weiss	(United States) Johan Kriek (United States) Michael Robertson (South Africa) Wayne Ferreira (West Germany) Martin Sinner
April 16	Durban Challenger; Durban, South Africa $50,000 – hard – 32S/16D; Singles draw – Doubles draw	(South Africa) Wayne Ferreira (South Africa) Piet Norval; 6–0, 2–6, 6–3	(South Africa) Stefan Kruger (United States) Greg Van Emburgh	(South Africa) Stefan Kruger (United States) Robbie Weiss	(United States) Johan Kriek (United States) Michael Robertson (South Africa) Wayne Ferreira (West Germany) Martin Sinner
April 16	Mexico City Challenger; Mexico City, Mexico $100,000 – clay – 32S/16D; Singles draw – Doubles draw	(Mexico) Francisco Maciel; 2–6, 7–6, 6–3	(Mexico) Luis Herrera	(Peru) Pablo Arraya (Mexico) Jorge Lozano	(Canada) Andrew Sznajder (Mexico) Leonardo Lavalle (United States) Bryan Shelton (Canada) Martin Wostenholme
April 16	Mexico City Challenger; Mexico City, Mexico $100,000 – clay – 32S/16D; Singles draw – Doubles draw	(Argentina) Pablo Albano (Sweden) Ville Jansson; 7–6, 4–6, 7–5	(Nigeria) Nduka Odizor (United States) Bryan Shelton	(Peru) Pablo Arraya (Mexico) Jorge Lozano	(Canada) Andrew Sznajder (Mexico) Leonardo Lavalle (United States) Bryan Shelton (Canada) Martin Wostenholme
April 16	Porto Challenger; Porto, Portugal $100,000 – clay – 32S/16D; Singles draw – Doubles draw	(Netherlands) Mark Koevermans; 6–3, 6–3	(Argentina) Franco Davín	(Australia) Richard Fromberg (France) Tarik Benhabiles	(Portugal) Nuno Marques (Italy) Renzo Furlan (West Germany) Jens Wöhrmann (United States) Lawson Duncan
April 16	Porto Challenger; Porto, Portugal $100,000 – clay – 32S/16D; Singles draw – Doubles draw	(Argentina) Eduardo Bengoechea (Argentina) Christian Miniussi; 6–0, 6–3	(Spain) José Clavet (Spain) Francisco Roig	(Australia) Richard Fromberg (France) Tarik Benhabiles	(Portugal) Nuno Marques (Italy) Renzo Furlan (West Germany) Jens Wöhrmann (United States) Lawson Duncan
April 23	Nagoya Challenger; Nagoya, Japan $50,000 – hard – 32S/16D; Singles draw – Doubles draw	(India) Ramesh Krishnan; 6–2, 6–4	(United States) Brian Garrow	(Japan) Shuzo Matsuoka (Canada) Chris Pridham	(Czechoslovakia) Ctislav Doseděl (West Germany) Christian Saceanu (United States) Buff Farrow (Netherlands) Menno Oosting
April 23	Nagoya Challenger; Nagoya, Japan $50,000 – hard – 32S/16D; Singles draw – Doubles draw	(Sweden) Johan Carlsson (New Zealand) David Lewis; 7–5, 6–2	(Japan) Shuzo Matsuoka (Japan) Shigeru Ota	(Japan) Shuzo Matsuoka (Canada) Chris Pridham	(Czechoslovakia) Ctislav Doseděl (West Germany) Christian Saceanu (United States) Buff Farrow (Netherlands) Menno Oosting
April 23	Pretoria Challenger; Pretoria, South Africa $25,000 – hard (I) – 32S/16D; Singles draw – Doubles draw	(West Germany) Martin Sinner; 6–4, 6–4	(South Africa) Wayne Ferreira	(United States) Robbie Weiss (West Germany) Christian Geyer	(South Africa) Byron Talbot (West Germany) Alexander Mronz (South Africa) Royce Deppe (United States) Martin Davis
April 23	Pretoria Challenger; Pretoria, South Africa $25,000 – hard (I) – 32S/16D; Singles draw – Doubles draw	(United States) Mark Keil (United States) Scott Patridge; 6–7, 6–4, 6–4	(South Africa) Stefan Kruger (United States) Greg Van Emburgh	(United States) Robbie Weiss (West Germany) Christian Geyer	(South Africa) Byron Talbot (West Germany) Alexander Mronz (South Africa) Royce Deppe (United States) Martin Davis
April 30	Tampa Challenger; Tampa, United States $50,000 – clay – 32S/16D; Singles draw – Doubles draw	(United States) Bryan Shelton; 6–7, 6–2, 6–1	(Australia) Broderick Dyke	(Sweden) Ville Jansson (United States) Jimmy Brown	(United States) John Sobel (Peru) Pablo Arraya (United States) David Pate (United States) John Ross
April 30	Tampa Challenger; Tampa, United States $50,000 – clay – 32S/16D; Singles draw – Doubles draw	(United States) Ken Flach (United States) Doug Flach; 3–6, 7–6, 6–4	(Australia) Broderick Dyke (Sweden) Tobias Svantesson	(Sweden) Ville Jansson (United States) Jimmy Brown	(United States) John Sobel (Peru) Pablo Arraya (United States) David Pate (United States) John Ross

=== May ===
Week of	Tournament	Champions	Runners-up	Semifinalists	Quarterfinalists
May 7	Kuala Lumpur Challenger; Kuala Lumpur, Malaysia $50,000 – hard – 32S/16D; Singles draw – Doubles draw	(Nigeria) Nduka Odizor; 6–3, 3–6, 6–3	(Czechoslovakia) Ctislav Doseděl	(Netherlands) Jacco Eltingh (Netherlands) Jan Siemerink	(United States) David Harkness (Netherlands) Menno Oosting (New Zealand) Bruce Derlin (United States) Jonathan Canter
May 7	Kuala Lumpur Challenger; Kuala Lumpur, Malaysia $50,000 – hard – 32S/16D; Singles draw – Doubles draw	(Nigeria) Nduka Odizor (Kenya) Paul Wekesa; 6–3, 6–4	(United States) Jonathan Canter (New Zealand) Bruce Derlin	(Netherlands) Jacco Eltingh (Netherlands) Jan Siemerink	(United States) David Harkness (Netherlands) Menno Oosting (New Zealand) Bruce Derlin (United States) Jonathan Canter
May 7	Renault Slovenian Open (Socialist Federal Republic of Yugoslavia) Ljubljana, Yugoslavia $50,000 – clay – 32S/16D; Singles draw – Doubles draw	(Sweden) Magnus Larsson; 7–5, 6–7, 7–6	(Italy) Diego Nargiso	(Italy) Omar Camporese (Netherlands) Mark Koevermans	(Soviet Union) Andres Võsand (Belgium) Bart Wuyts (Spain) Carlos Costa (Italy) Massimo Cierro
May 7	Renault Slovenian Open (Socialist Federal Republic of Yugoslavia) Ljubljana, Yugoslavia $50,000 – clay – 32S/16D; Singles draw – Doubles draw	(Spain) Carlos Costa (Spain) Francisco Roig; 6–7, 6–4, 6–4	(Italy) Omar Camporese (Netherlands) Mark Koevermans	(Italy) Omar Camporese (Netherlands) Mark Koevermans	(Soviet Union) Andres Võsand (Belgium) Bart Wuyts (Spain) Carlos Costa (Italy) Massimo Cierro
May 14	Bangkok Challenger; Bangkok, Thailand $25,000 – hard – 32S/16D; Singles draw – Doubles draw	(Czechoslovakia) Ctislav Doseděl; 6–3, 6–4	(West Germany) Patrick Baur	(Netherlands) Menno Oosting (Portugal) João Cunha e Silva	(Netherlands) Jan Siemerink (Nigeria) Nduka Odizor (United States) Jonathan Canter (West Germany) Harald Rittersbacher
May 14	Bangkok Challenger; Bangkok, Thailand $25,000 – hard – 32S/16D; Singles draw – Doubles draw	(United States) Jonathan Canter (New Zealand) Bruce Derlin; 6–4, 6–4	(Australia) Neil Borwick (New Zealand) David Lewis	(Netherlands) Menno Oosting (Portugal) João Cunha e Silva	(Netherlands) Jan Siemerink (Nigeria) Nduka Odizor (United States) Jonathan Canter (West Germany) Harald Rittersbacher
May 21	No tournaments scheduled.				
May 28	Franken Challenge; Fürth, West Germany $50,000 – clay – 32S/16D; Singles draw – Doubles draw	(United States) Jeff Tarango; 6–0, 6–0	(Chile) Felipe Rivera	(Peru) Pablo Arraya (Belgium) Bart Wuyts	(Czechoslovakia) Richard Vogel (Spain) Marcos Górriz (West Germany) Peter Ballauff (Sweden) Jan Apell
May 28	Franken Challenge; Fürth, West Germany $50,000 – clay – 32S/16D; Singles draw – Doubles draw	(West Germany) Peter Ballauff (West Germany) Ricki Osterthun; 7–6, 4–6, 6–3	(Spain) Marcos Górriz (Soviet Union) Andrei Olhovskiy	(Peru) Pablo Arraya (Belgium) Bart Wuyts	(Czechoslovakia) Richard Vogel (Spain) Marcos Górriz (West Germany) Peter Ballauff (Sweden) Jan Apell

=== June ===
Week of	Tournament	Champions	Runners-up	Semifinalists	Quarterfinalists
June 4	No tournaments scheduled.				
June 11	No tournaments scheduled.				
June 18	No tournaments scheduled.				
June 25	Turin Challenger; Turin, Italy $50,000 – clay – 32S/16D; Singles draw – Doubles draw	(Portugal) João Cunha e Silva; 7–6, 6–7, 6–4	(United States) Jimmy Brown	(Argentina) Gabriel Markus (Spain) Marcos Górriz	(West Germany) Bernd Karbacher (Belgium) Bart Wuyts (Italy) Renzo Furlan (Peru) Pablo Arraya
June 25	Turin Challenger; Turin, Italy $50,000 – clay – 32S/16D; Singles draw – Doubles draw	(Australia) Neil Borwick (New Zealand) David Lewis; 6–2, 3–6, 6–2	(Sweden) Christer Allgårdh (West Germany) Martin Sinner	(Argentina) Gabriel Markus (Spain) Marcos Górriz	(West Germany) Bernd Karbacher (Belgium) Bart Wuyts (Italy) Renzo Furlan (Peru) Pablo Arraya

=== July ===
Week of	Tournament	Champions	Runners-up	Semifinalists	Quarterfinalists
July 2	Salou Challenger; Salou, Spain $75,000 – clay – 32S/16D; Singles draw – Doubles draw	(Uruguay) Marcelo Filippini; 6–3, 6–1	(United States) Jimmy Arias	(Italy) Renzo Furlan (Spain) Francisco Clavet	(United States) Jimmy Brown (Spain) José Francisco Altur (Spain) David de Miguel (United States) Philip Johnson
July 2	Salou Challenger; Salou, Spain $75,000 – clay – 32S/16D; Singles draw – Doubles draw	(Australia) Neil Borwick (New Zealand) David Lewis; 6–3, 5–7, 6–3	(United States) Jimmy Arias (United States) Steve DeVries	(Italy) Renzo Furlan (Spain) Francisco Clavet	(United States) Jimmy Brown (Spain) José Francisco Altur (Spain) David de Miguel (United States) Philip Johnson
July 9	Neu-Ulm Challenger; Neu-Ulm, West Germany $50,000 – clay – 32S/16D; Singles draw – Doubles draw	(Soviet Union) Dimitri Poliakov; 3–6, 7–5, 6–3	(Belgium) Bart Wuyts	(Argentina) Marcelo Ingaramo (Italy) Claudio Pistolesi	(West Germany) Jens Wöhrmann (Argentina) Gabriel Markus (Italy) Renzo Furlan (West Germany) Rüdiger Haas
July 9	Neu-Ulm Challenger; Neu-Ulm, West Germany $50,000 – clay – 32S/16D; Singles draw – Doubles draw	(Italy) Massimo Cierro (Italy) Simone Colombo; 0–6, 6–2, 6–1	(Romania) George Cosac (Czechoslovakia) Vojtěch Flégl	(Argentina) Marcelo Ingaramo (Italy) Claudio Pistolesi	(West Germany) Jens Wöhrmann (Argentina) Gabriel Markus (Italy) Renzo Furlan (West Germany) Rüdiger Haas
July 16	Bristol Challenger (United Kingdom) Bristol, Great Britain $50,000 – grass – 32S/16D; Singles draw – Doubles draw	(West Germany) Christian Saceanu; 6–3, 6–7, 6–3	(France) Arnaud Boetsch	(United Kingdom) Mark Petchey (United Kingdom) Chris Wilkinson	(Sweden) Peter Nyborg (Netherlands) Menno Oosting (South Africa) Royce Deppe (Belgium) Libor Pimek
July 16	Bristol Challenger (United Kingdom) Bristol, Great Britain $50,000 – grass – 32S/16D; Singles draw – Doubles draw	(Soviet Union) Andrei Olhovskiy (Finland) Olli Rahnasto; 7–5, 6–4	(France) Arnaud Boetsch (Sweden) Peter Nyborg	(United Kingdom) Mark Petchey (United Kingdom) Chris Wilkinson	(Sweden) Peter Nyborg (Netherlands) Menno Oosting (South Africa) Royce Deppe (Belgium) Libor Pimek
July 16	Gramado Challenger; Gramado, Brazil $50,000 – clay – 32S/16D; Singles draw – Doubles draw	(Chile) Pedro Rebolledo; 6–2, 6–3	(West Germany) Christian Weis	(Brazil) William Kyriakos (Argentina) Pablo Albano	(Spain) José Clavet (Argentina) Eduardo Bengoechea (Mexico) Agustín Moreno (Portugal) João Cunha e Silva
July 16	Gramado Challenger; Gramado, Brazil $50,000 – clay – 32S/16D; Singles draw – Doubles draw	(Brazil) Ivan Kley (Spain) Vicente Solves; 6–3, 7–5	(Argentina) Pablo Albano (Argentina) Eduardo Bengoechea	(Brazil) William Kyriakos (Argentina) Pablo Albano	(Spain) José Clavet (Argentina) Eduardo Bengoechea (Mexico) Agustín Moreno (Portugal) João Cunha e Silva
July 16	Tampere Open; Tampere, Finland $100,000 – clay – 32S/16D; Singles draw – Doubles draw	(Italy) Renzo Furlan; 6–3, 6–3	(Spain) Fernando Luna	(Finland) Veli Paloheimo (Sweden) Nicklas Kulti	(Sweden) Magnus Zeile (Sweden) Magnus Larsson (Finland) Aki Rahunen (Czech Republic) Martin Střelba
July 16	Tampere Open; Tampere, Finland $100,000 – clay – 32S/16D; Singles draw – Doubles draw	(Netherlands) Mark Koevermans (Netherlands) Jan Siemerink; 6–2, 6–1	(Italy) Massimo Cierro (Sweden) Tobias Svantesson	(Finland) Veli Paloheimo (Sweden) Nicklas Kulti	(Sweden) Magnus Zeile (Sweden) Magnus Larsson (Finland) Aki Rahunen (Czech Republic) Martin Střelba
July 23	Comerica Bank Challenger; Aptos, United States $50,000 – hard – 32S/16D; Singles draw – Doubles draw	(Sweden) Henrik Holm; 1–6, 6–3, 7–6	(United States) Brian Garrow	(Portugal) Nuno Marques (Italy) Diego Nargiso	(South Africa) David Nainkin (West Germany) Alexander Mronz (Sweden) Johan Carlsson (United States) Matt Anger
July 23	Comerica Bank Challenger; Aptos, United States $50,000 – hard – 32S/16D; Singles draw – Doubles draw	(United States) Jeff Brown (United States) Scott Melville; 6–7, 6–4, 6–4	(United States) Matt Anger (South Africa) Marius Barnard	(Portugal) Nuno Marques (Italy) Diego Nargiso	(South Africa) David Nainkin (West Germany) Alexander Mronz (Sweden) Johan Carlsson (United States) Matt Anger
July 23	Campos Challenger; Campos, Brazil $50,000 – hard – 32S/16D; Singles draw – Doubles draw	(Brazil) Jaime Oncins; 6–3, 6–3	(Brazil) José Daher	(Brazil) Marcelo Saliola (Argentina) Daniel Orsanic	(Brazil) Cássio Motta (France) Frédéric Fontang (Brazil) Fernando Roese (Portugal) João Cunha e Silva
July 23	Campos Challenger; Campos, Brazil $50,000 – hard – 32S/16D; Singles draw – Doubles draw	(Brazil) José Daher (Brazil) Jaime Oncins; 7–6, 6–4	(Brazil) Nelson Aerts (Brazil) Fernando Roese	(Brazil) Marcelo Saliola (Argentina) Daniel Orsanic	(Brazil) Cássio Motta (France) Frédéric Fontang (Brazil) Fernando Roese (Portugal) João Cunha e Silva
July 23	Hanko Challenger; Hanko, Finland $75,000 – clay – 32S/16D; Singles draw – Doubles draw	(West Germany) Martin Sinner; 6–3, 6–3	(Soviet Union) Andrei Olhovskiy	(Netherlands) Jan Siemerink (Finland) Veli Paloheimo	(Finland) Olli Rahnasto (Spain) Marcos Górriz (Soviet Union) Andres Võsand (Belgium) Bart Wuyts
July 23	Hanko Challenger; Hanko, Finland $75,000 – clay – 32S/16D; Singles draw – Doubles draw	(Australia) Johan Anderson (Sweden) Lars-Anders Wahlgren; 6–3, 7–6	(Sweden) Tomas Nydahl (Sweden) Peter Svensson	(Netherlands) Jan Siemerink (Finland) Veli Paloheimo	(Finland) Olli Rahnasto (Spain) Marcos Górriz (Soviet Union) Andres Võsand (Belgium) Bart Wuyts
July 30	Lins Challenger; Lins, Brazil $50,000 – clay – 32S/16D; Singles draw – Doubles draw	(Chile) Pedro Rebolledo; 7–6, 4–6, 6–1	(Brazil) João Zwetsch	(Brazil) Luiz Mattar (Argentina) Daniel Orsanic	(Brazil) Nelson Aerts (Argentina) Pablo Albano (Brazil) Jaime Oncins (Portugal) João Cunha e Silva
July 30	Lins Challenger; Lins, Brazil $50,000 – clay – 32S/16D; Singles draw – Doubles draw	(Spain) José Luis Aparisi (Spain) José Clavet; 7–6, 6–3	(Argentina) Javier Frana (Mexico) Agustín Moreno	(Brazil) Luiz Mattar (Argentina) Daniel Orsanic	(Brazil) Nelson Aerts (Argentina) Pablo Albano (Brazil) Jaime Oncins (Portugal) João Cunha e Silva
July 30	Nielsen Pro Tennis Championship; Winnetka, United States $50,000 – hard – 32S/16D; Singles draw – Doubles draw	(Italy) Cristiano Caratti; 7–6, 6–1	(United States) Chris Garner	(Canada) Chris Pridham (South Africa) Grant Stafford	(United States) Todd Martin (Portugal) Nuno Marques (United States) Tommy Ho (United Kingdom) Mark Petchey
July 30	Nielsen Pro Tennis Championship; Winnetka, United States $50,000 – hard – 32S/16D; Singles draw – Doubles draw	(India) Zeeshan Ali (Netherlands) Menno Oosting; 4–6, 6–3, 6–2	(United States) Doug Flach (Mexico) Luis Herrera	(Canada) Chris Pridham (South Africa) Grant Stafford	(United States) Todd Martin (Portugal) Nuno Marques (United States) Tommy Ho (United Kingdom) Mark Petchey

=== August ===
Week of	Tournament	Champions	Runners-up	Semifinalists	Quarterfinalists
August 6	Jakarta-2 Challenger; Jakarta, Indonesia $25,000 – hard – 32S/16D; Singles draw – Doubles draw	(United States) Mark Keil; 6–4, 6–2	(United States) Scott Patridge	(South Korea) Kim Bong-soo (United Kingdom) Paul Hand	(West Germany) Harald Rittersbacher (United States) Mike Briggs (Indonesia) Daniel Heryanto (Japan) Eduardo Furusho
August 6	Jakarta-2 Challenger; Jakarta, Indonesia $25,000 – hard – 32S/16D; Singles draw – Doubles draw	(United States) Mike Briggs (United States) David Harkness; 6–2, 7–6	(Indonesia) Suharyadi Suharyadi (Chinese Taipei) Lin Bing-chao	(South Korea) Kim Bong-soo (United Kingdom) Paul Hand	(West Germany) Harald Rittersbacher (United States) Mike Briggs (Indonesia) Daniel Heryanto (Japan) Eduardo Furusho
August 6	Knokke Challenger; Knokke, Belgium $50,000 – clay – 32S/16D; Singles draw – Doubles draw	(Spain) Marcos Górriz; 7–5, 2–6, 6–1	(Czechoslovakia) Josef Čihák	(Spain) Germán López (Belgium) Libor Pimek	(Ecuador) Raúl Viver (Netherlands) Paul Dogger (Belgium) Filip Dewulf (Italy) Daniele Balducci
August 6	Knokke Challenger; Knokke, Belgium $50,000 – clay – 32S/16D; Singles draw – Doubles draw	(Soviet Union) Andrei Olhovskiy (Soviet Union) Dimitri Poliakov; 6–4, 4–6, 6–3	(Belgium) Xavier Daufresne (Belgium) Denis Langaskens	(Spain) Germán López (Belgium) Libor Pimek	(Ecuador) Raúl Viver (Netherlands) Paul Dogger (Belgium) Filip Dewulf (Italy) Daniele Balducci
August 6	São Paulo-2 Challenger; São Paulo, Brazil $50,000 – clay – 32S/16D; Singles draw – Doubles draw	(Portugal) João Cunha e Silva; 6–1, 6–2	(Brazil) Cássio Motta	(Argentina) Javier Frana (Chile) Pedro Rebolledo	(France) Frédéric Fontang (Argentina) Pablo Albano (Brazil) Jaime Oncins (Spain) Vicente Solves
August 6	São Paulo-2 Challenger; São Paulo, Brazil $50,000 – clay – 32S/16D; Singles draw – Doubles draw	(Argentina) Javier Frana (Brazil) Cássio Motta; 6–3, 3–6, 6–1	(Argentina) Gabriel Markus (Brazil) João Zwetsch	(Argentina) Javier Frana (Chile) Pedro Rebolledo	(France) Frédéric Fontang (Argentina) Pablo Albano (Brazil) Jaime Oncins (Spain) Vicente Solves
August 13	Brasília-2 Challenger; Brasília, Brazil $75,000 – hard – 64S/32D; Singles draw – Doubles draw	(Brazil) Cássio Motta; 7–6, 6–4	(Brazil) Jaime Oncins	(Brazil) Mauro Menezes (Brazil) Danilo Marcelino	(Brazil) Nelson Aerts (Spain) Vicente Solves (Brazil) Ricardo Acioly (Brazil) Fernando Roese
August 13	Brasília-2 Challenger; Brasília, Brazil $75,000 – hard – 64S/32D; Singles draw – Doubles draw	(Brazil) Jaime Oncins (Canada) Andrew Sznajder; 7–5, 3–6, 7–6	(Brazil) Luiz Mattar (Brazil) Fernando Roese	(Brazil) Mauro Menezes (Brazil) Danilo Marcelino	(Brazil) Nelson Aerts (Spain) Vicente Solves (Brazil) Ricardo Acioly (Brazil) Fernando Roese
August 13	Pescara Challenger; Pescara, Italy $50,000 – clay – 32S/16D; Singles draw – Doubles draw	(Sweden) Christer Allgårdh; 4–6, 6–3, 6–4	(Spain) Germán López	(France) Éric Winogradsky (Sweden) Thomas Haldin	(Czechoslovakia) Branislav Stankovič (Italy) Massimo Cierro (Italy) Francesco Cancellotti (Italy) Stefano Pescosolido
August 13	Pescara Challenger; Pescara, Italy $50,000 – clay – 32S/16D; Singles draw – Doubles draw	(Czechoslovakia) Branislav Stankovič (Czechoslovakia) Richard Vogel; 6–3, 6–1	(Italy) Massimo Cierro (Italy) Alessandro de Minicis	(France) Éric Winogradsky (Sweden) Thomas Haldin	(Czechoslovakia) Branislav Stankovič (Italy) Massimo Cierro (Italy) Francesco Cancellotti (Italy) Stefano Pescosolido
August 13	Salzburg Challenger; Salzburg, Austria $100,000 – clay – 32S/16D; Singles draw – Doubles draw	(Austria) Horst Skoff; 6–2, 6–2	(Spain) José Francisco Altur	(Italy) Renzo Furlan (Sweden) Nicklas Kulti	(Czechoslovakia) Marián Vajda (West Germany) Christian Geyer (Argentina) Horacio de la Peña (United States) Jimmy Brown
August 13	Salzburg Challenger; Salzburg, Austria $100,000 – clay – 32S/16D; Singles draw – Doubles draw	(Argentina) Horacio de la Peña (Austria) Horst Skoff; 6–2, 6–4	(Sweden) Johan Donar (Sweden) Ola Jonsson	(Italy) Renzo Furlan (Sweden) Nicklas Kulti	(Czechoslovakia) Marián Vajda (West Germany) Christian Geyer (Argentina) Horacio de la Peña (United States) Jimmy Brown
August 20	Geneva Open Challenger; Geneva, Switzerland $50,000 – clay – 32S/16D; Singles draw – Doubles draw	(Argentina) Roberto Argüello; 6–3, 6–0	(Argentina) Daniel Orsanic	(Sweden) Henrik Holm (Czechoslovakia) Tomáš Anzari	(Netherlands) Jacco Eltingh (Switzerland) Stefano Mezzadri (Denmark) Michael Tauson (France) Frédéric Fontang
August 20	Geneva Open Challenger; Geneva, Switzerland $50,000 – clay – 32S/16D; Singles draw – Doubles draw	(Sweden) Henrik Holm (Sweden) Nils Holm; 3–6, 7–5, 7–6	(Czechoslovakia) Branislav Stankovič (Czechoslovakia) Richard Vogel	(Sweden) Henrik Holm (Czechoslovakia) Tomáš Anzari	(Netherlands) Jacco Eltingh (Switzerland) Stefano Mezzadri (Denmark) Michael Tauson (France) Frédéric Fontang
August 27	Verona Challenger; Verona, Italy $50,000 – clay – 32S/16D; Singles draw – Doubles draw	(Netherlands) Richard Krajicek; 4–6, 6–1, 6–4	(Netherlands) Jacco Eltingh	(Italy) Paolo Pambianco (Italy) Corrado Aprili	(Argentina) Daniel Orsanic (Soviet Union) Dimitri Poliakov (Netherlands) Jan Siemerink (Spain) José Clavet
August 27	Verona Challenger; Verona, Italy $50,000 – clay – 32S/16D; Singles draw – Doubles draw	(Czechoslovakia) Ctislav Doseděl (Soviet Union) Dimitri Poliakov; 6–0, 6–7, 6–4	(Netherlands) Jacco Eltingh (Netherlands) Menno Oosting	(Italy) Paolo Pambianco (Italy) Corrado Aprili	(Argentina) Daniel Orsanic (Soviet Union) Dimitri Poliakov (Netherlands) Jan Siemerink (Spain) José Clavet

=== September ===
Week of	Tournament	Champions	Runners-up	Semifinalists	Quarterfinalists
September 3	Hossegor Challenger; Hossegor, France $100,000 – clay – 32S/16D; Singles draw – Doubles draw	(France) Rodolphe Gilbert; 6–4, 6–4	(Haiti) Ronald Agénor	(Portugal) Nuno Marques (Italy) Renzo Furlan	(Belgium) Bart Wuyts (Spain) Fernando Luna (Netherlands) Tom Nijssen (Spain) José Francisco Altur
September 3	Hossegor Challenger; Hossegor, France $100,000 – clay – 32S/16D; Singles draw – Doubles draw	(Spain) Marcos Górriz (Argentina) Marcelo Ingaramo; 7–5, 6–2	(Argentina) Eduardo Bengoechea (Belgium) Eduardo Masso	(Portugal) Nuno Marques (Italy) Renzo Furlan	(Belgium) Bart Wuyts (Spain) Fernando Luna (Netherlands) Tom Nijssen (Spain) José Francisco Altur
September 3	Venice Challenger; Venice, Italy $50,000 – clay – 32S/16D; Singles draw – Doubles draw	(Socialist Federal Republic of Yugoslavia) Bruno Orešar; 6–3, 6–3	(Soviet Union) Andrei Olhovskiy	(Austria) Oliver Fuchs (Italy) Claudio Pistolesi	(Italy) Paolo Canè (Peru) Pablo Arraya (Italy) Massimo Cierro (Spain) Germán López
September 3	Venice Challenger; Venice, Italy $50,000 – clay – 32S/16D; Singles draw – Doubles draw	(Italy) Cristian Brandi (Italy) Federico Mordegan; 6–1, 6–4	(Sweden) Henrik Holm (Sweden) Nils Holm	(Austria) Oliver Fuchs (Italy) Claudio Pistolesi	(Italy) Paolo Canè (Peru) Pablo Arraya (Italy) Massimo Cierro (Spain) Germán López
September 10	Azores Challenger; Azores, Portugal $50,000 – hard – 32S/16D; Singles draw – Doubles draw	(Spain) Francisco Roig; 6–3, 2–6, 6–4	(Canada) Chris Pridham	(United States) Ken Flach (Nigeria) Nduka Odizor	(Venezuela) Maurice Ruah (France) Frédéric Fontang (Spain) Daniel Marco (Sweden) Johan Carlsson
September 10	Azores Challenger; Azores, Portugal $50,000 – hard – 32S/16D; Singles draw – Doubles draw	(South Africa) Brent Haygarth (United States) Scott Patridge; 6–7, 7–6, 6–3	(United Kingdom) Andrew Castle (Nigeria) Nduka Odizor	(United States) Ken Flach (Nigeria) Nduka Odizor	(Venezuela) Maurice Ruah (France) Frédéric Fontang (Spain) Daniel Marco (Sweden) Johan Carlsson
September 10	Canberra Challenger; Canberra, Australia $25,000 – carpet – 32S/16D; Singles draw – Doubles draw	(New Zealand) Brett Steven; 6–3, 6–4	(Australia) Andrew Kratzmann	(Australia) Jamie Morgan (United States) John Stimpson	(Australia) Michael Brown (United States) Francisco Montana (Australia) Sandon Stolle (Australia) Brett Custer
September 10	Canberra Challenger; Canberra, Australia $25,000 – carpet – 32S/16D; Singles draw – Doubles draw	(Australia) Brett Custer (Australia) Peter Doohan; 6–3, 6–4	(South Africa) David Adams (Australia) Jamie Morgan	(Australia) Jamie Morgan (United States) John Stimpson	(Australia) Michael Brown (United States) Francisco Montana (Australia) Sandon Stolle (Australia) Brett Custer
September 17	Coquitlam Challenger; Coquitlam, Canada $50,000 – hard – 32S/16D; Singles draw – Doubles draw	(United States) Steve DeVries; 3–6, 7–5, 7–5	(United States) Chuck Adams	(United States) Chris Garner (United States) Robbie Weiss	(United States) Mike Briggs (Puerto Rico) Miguel Nido (United States) Otis Smith (United States) George Bezecny
September 17	Coquitlam Challenger; Coquitlam, Canada $50,000 – hard – 32S/16D; Singles draw – Doubles draw	(United States) Steve DeVries (United States) Patrick Galbraith; 7–5, 7–5	(United States) Otis Smith (The Bahamas) Roger Smith	(United States) Chris Garner (United States) Robbie Weiss	(United States) Mike Briggs (Puerto Rico) Miguel Nido (United States) Otis Smith (United States) George Bezecny
September 17	Dijon Challenger; Dijon, France $100,000 – carpet – 32S/16D; Singles draw – Doubles draw	(France) Guillaume Raoux; 2–6, 6–4, 6–4	(Sweden) Henrik Holm	(Portugal) Nuno Marques (Sweden) Jan Apell	(West Germany) Dirk Dier (West Germany) Martin Sinner (France) Rodolphe Gilbert (West Germany) Michael Kupferschmid
September 17	Dijon Challenger; Dijon, France $100,000 – carpet – 32S/16D; Singles draw – Doubles draw	(Iran) Mansour Bahrami (France) Rodolphe Gilbert; 7–5, 6–2	(Sweden) Jan Apell (Sweden) Peter Nyborg	(Portugal) Nuno Marques (Sweden) Jan Apell	(West Germany) Dirk Dier (West Germany) Martin Sinner (France) Rodolphe Gilbert (West Germany) Michael Kupferschmid
September 17	International Tournament of Messina; Messina, Italy $100,000 – clay – 32S/16D; Singles draw – Doubles draw	(Argentina) Guillermo Pérez Roldán; 6–1, 6–3	(Italy) Stefano Pescosolido	(Spain) Francisco Roig (Italy) Renzo Furlan	(Soviet Union) Andres Võsand (Spain) Francisco Clavet (Spain) Fernando Luna (Argentina) Franco Davín
September 17	International Tournament of Messina; Messina, Italy $100,000 – clay – 32S/16D; Singles draw – Doubles draw	(Spain) Germán López (Spain) Francisco Roig; 6–3, 6–2	(Peru) Pablo Arraya (Spain) Carlos Costa	(Spain) Francisco Roig (Italy) Renzo Furlan	(Soviet Union) Andres Võsand (Spain) Francisco Clavet (Spain) Fernando Luna (Argentina) Franco Davín
September 24	Bogotá Challenger; Bogotá, Colombia $50,000 – clay – 32S/16D; Singles draw – Doubles draw	(Colombia) Álvaro Jordan; 6–3, 6–3	(Czechoslovakia) Libor Němeček	(Chile) Pedro Rebolledo (Ecuador) Giorgio Carneade	(Chile) Felipe Rivera (United States) Greg Failla (Brazil) José Daher (Chile) José Antonio Fernández
September 24	Bogotá Challenger; Bogotá, Colombia $50,000 – clay – 32S/16D; Singles draw – Doubles draw	(Colombia) Mauricio Hadad (Colombia) Mario Rincón; 7–6, 7–6	(Venezuela) Carlos Claverie (United States) Greg Failla	(Chile) Pedro Rebolledo (Ecuador) Giorgio Carneade	(Chile) Felipe Rivera (United States) Greg Failla (Brazil) José Daher (Chile) José Antonio Fernández
September 24	Thessaloniki Challenger; Thessaloniki, Greece $50,000 – hard – 32S/16D; Singles draw – Doubles draw	(West Germany) Christian Geyer; 7–6, 6–3	(Sweden) Henrik Holm	(Italy) Gianluca Pozzi (West Germany) Lars Koslowski	(United States) Scott Patridge (Sweden) Johan Carlsson (Israel) Shahar Perkiss (Australia) Neil Borwick
September 24	Thessaloniki Challenger; Thessaloniki, Greece $50,000 – hard – 32S/16D; Singles draw – Doubles draw	(Israel) Gilad Bloom (United States) Alexis Hombrecher; 6–1, 7–6	(United Kingdom) Nick Brown (Sweden) Johan Carlsson	(Italy) Gianluca Pozzi (West Germany) Lars Koslowski	(United States) Scott Patridge (Sweden) Johan Carlsson (Israel) Shahar Perkiss (Australia) Neil Borwick

=== October ===
Week of	Tournament	Champions	Runners-up	Semifinalists	Quarterfinalists
October 1	Manaus Challenger; Manaus, Brazil $50,000 – hard – 32S/16D; Singles draw – Doubles draw	(Mexico) Luis Herrera; 6–2, 7–5	(Brazil) Jaime Oncins	(United States) Shelby Cannon (Sweden) Tobias Svantesson	(Brazil) Cássio Motta (Brazil) Danilo Marcelino (Brazil) José Daher (Colombia) Mario Rincón
October 1	Manaus Challenger; Manaus, Brazil $50,000 – hard – 32S/16D; Singles draw – Doubles draw	(United States) Shelby Cannon (Venezuela) Alfonso Mora; 7–6, 6–4	(Brazil) Ricardo Acioly (Brazil) Mauro Menezes	(United States) Shelby Cannon (Sweden) Tobias Svantesson	(Brazil) Cássio Motta (Brazil) Danilo Marcelino (Brazil) José Daher (Colombia) Mario Rincón
October 1	Singapore Challenger; Singapore, Singapore $50,000 – hard – 32S/16D; Singles draw – Doubles draw	(West Germany) Boris Laustroer; 7–6, 6–4	(Netherlands) Sander Groen	(Australia) Neil Borwick (United States) Mike Briggs	(United States) Tommy Ho (Kenya) Paul Wekesa (New Zealand) Bruce Derlin (United States) John Letts
October 1	Singapore Challenger; Singapore, Singapore $50,000 – hard – 32S/16D; Singles draw – Doubles draw	(New Zealand) Steve Guy (United States) John Letts; 6–1, 7–5	(United States) Kent Kinnear (United States) Mark Keil	(Australia) Neil Borwick (United States) Mike Briggs	(United States) Tommy Ho (Kenya) Paul Wekesa (New Zealand) Bruce Derlin (United States) John Letts
October 8	Casablanca Challenger; Casablanca, Morocco $50,000 – clay – 32S/16D; Singles draw – Doubles draw	(Netherlands) Richard Krajicek; 7–6, 6–3	(Czechoslovakia) Ctislav Doseděl	(Spain) José Francisco Altur (Spain) José Luis Aparisi	(France) Tarik Benhabiles (Argentina) Roberto Azar (Germany) Hans Schwaier (Spain) Francisco Clavet
October 8	Casablanca Challenger; Casablanca, Morocco $50,000 – clay – 32S/16D; Singles draw – Doubles draw	(Spain) Juan Carlos Báguena (Spain) Francisco Roig; 7–5, 5–7, 6–4	(Czechoslovakia) Ctislav Doseděl (Netherlands) Richard Krajicek	(Spain) José Francisco Altur (Spain) José Luis Aparisi	(France) Tarik Benhabiles (Argentina) Roberto Azar (Germany) Hans Schwaier (Spain) Francisco Clavet
October 8	Curitiba Challenger; Curitiba, Brazil $50,000 – hard – 32S/16D; Singles draw – Doubles draw	(Chile) Pedro Rebolledo; 6–1, 7–5	(Argentina) Javier Frana	(Brazil) Cássio Motta (Netherlands) Jacco Eltingh	(Mexico) Luis Herrera (Brazil) Jaime Oncins (Brazil) Danilo Marcelino (Cuba) Mario Tabares
October 8	Curitiba Challenger; Curitiba, Brazil $50,000 – hard – 32S/16D; Singles draw – Doubles draw	(Netherlands) Hendrik Jan Davids (Netherlands) Jacco Eltingh; 6–4, 3–6, 6–3	(Brazil) César Kist (Brazil) Danilo Marcelino	(Brazil) Cássio Motta (Netherlands) Jacco Eltingh	(Mexico) Luis Herrera (Brazil) Jaime Oncins (Brazil) Danilo Marcelino (Cuba) Mario Tabares
October 15	Ilhéus Challenger; Ilhéus, Brazil $75,000 – hard – 32S/16D; Singles draw – Doubles draw	(Mexico) Luis Herrera; 6–2, 6–2	(Germany) Patrick Baur	(Netherlands) Jacco Eltingh (Brazil) Danilo Marcelino	(Peru) Jaime Yzaga (Brazil) Jaime Oncins (Argentina) Eduardo Bengoechea (Chile) Pedro Rebolledo
October 15	Ilhéus Challenger; Ilhéus, Brazil $75,000 – hard – 32S/16D; Singles draw – Doubles draw	(Netherlands) Hendrik Jan Davids (Netherlands) Jacco Eltingh; 4–6, 6–3, 6–4	(The Bahamas) Roger Smith (Sweden) Tobias Svantesson	(Netherlands) Jacco Eltingh (Brazil) Danilo Marcelino	(Peru) Jaime Yzaga (Brazil) Jaime Oncins (Argentina) Eduardo Bengoechea (Chile) Pedro Rebolledo
October 15	Ponte Vedra Challenger; Ponte Vedra Beach, United States $50,000 – hard – 32S/16D; Singles draw – Doubles draw	(United States) Tommy Ho; 7–6, 6–4	(Canada) Chris Pridham	(United States) Chris Garner (United States) Jimmy Brown	(United States) Philip Johnson (United States) Mark Keil (Socialist Federal Republic of Yugoslavia) Bruno Orešar (United States) Robert Seguso
October 15	Ponte Vedra Challenger; Ponte Vedra Beach, United States $50,000 – hard – 32S/16D; Singles draw – Doubles draw	(United States) Doug Flach (United States) Ken Flach; 6–3, 2–6, 6–4	(South Africa) Royce Deppe (United States) Bret Garnett	(United States) Chris Garner (United States) Jimmy Brown	(United States) Philip Johnson (United States) Mark Keil (Socialist Federal Republic of Yugoslavia) Bruno Orešar (United States) Robert Seguso
October 22	Brest Challenger; Brest, France $75,000 – hard (I) – 32S/16D; Singles draw – Doubles draw	(France) Cédric Pioline; 6–3, 6–4	(Netherlands) Richard Krajicek	(Sweden) Thomas Högstedt (Israel) Gilad Bloom	(India) Ramesh Krishnan (Spain) Francisco Roig (Finland) Aki Rahunen (France) Fabrice Santoro
October 22	Brest Challenger; Brest, France $75,000 – hard (I) – 32S/16D; Singles draw – Doubles draw	(Soviet Union) Ģirts Dzelde (Czechoslovakia) Martin Damm; 6–4, 6–4	(South Africa) Wayne Ferreira (South Africa) Piet Norval	(Sweden) Thomas Högstedt (Israel) Gilad Bloom	(India) Ramesh Krishnan (Spain) Francisco Roig (Finland) Aki Rahunen (France) Fabrice Santoro
October 29	Bergen Challenger; Bergen, Norway $100,000 – carpet (I) – 32S/16D; Singles draw – Doubles draw	(Germany) Alexander Mronz; 6–4, 6–4	(Sweden) Jan Gunnarsson	(Netherlands) Paul Haarhuis (Czechoslovakia) Ctislav Doseděl	(Sweden) Magnus Larsson (Austria) Alex Antonitsch (Germany) Eric Jelen (Sweden) Thomas Enqvist
October 29	Bergen Challenger; Bergen, Norway $100,000 – carpet (I) – 32S/16D; Singles draw – Doubles draw	(United States) Jeff Brown (Sweden) Anders Järryd; 6–3, 7–6	(United States) Charles Beckman (United States) Luke Jensen	(Netherlands) Paul Haarhuis (Czechoslovakia) Ctislav Doseděl	(Sweden) Magnus Larsson (Austria) Alex Antonitsch (Germany) Eric Jelen (Sweden) Thomas Enqvist
October 29	Rio de Janeiro Challenger; Rio de Janeiro, Brazil $75,000 – clay – 32S/16D; Singles draw – Doubles draw	(Brazil) Luiz Mattar; 6–3, 3–6, 6–3	(Mexico) Luis Herrera	(Portugal) Nuno Marques (Argentina) Javier Frana	(The Bahamas) Roger Smith (Spain) Marcos Górriz (Peru) Pablo Arraya (Belgium) Bart Wuyts
October 29	Rio de Janeiro Challenger; Rio de Janeiro, Brazil $75,000 – clay – 32S/16D; Singles draw – Doubles draw	(The Bahamas) Roger Smith (Sweden) Tobias Svantesson; 7–5, 6–4	(United States) Shelby Cannon (Venezuela) Alfonso Mora	(Portugal) Nuno Marques (Argentina) Javier Frana	(The Bahamas) Roger Smith (Spain) Marcos Górriz (Peru) Pablo Arraya (Belgium) Bart Wuyts

=== November ===
Week of	Tournament	Champions	Runners-up	Semifinalists	Quarterfinalists
November 5	No tournaments scheduled.				
November 12	São Paulo-3 Challenger; São Paulo, Brazil $50,000 – clay – 32S/16D; Singles draw – Doubles draw	(Brazil) Jaime Oncins; 6–3, 6–3	(Argentina) Francisco Yunis	(Argentina) Gabriel Markus (Portugal) João Cunha e Silva	(Argentina) Daniel Orsanic (Argentina) Javier Frana (United States) MaliVai Washington (Canada) Andrew Sznajder
November 12	São Paulo-3 Challenger; São Paulo, Brazil $50,000 – clay – 32S/16D; Singles draw – Doubles draw	(South Africa) Richard Lubner (United States) Francisco Montana; 6–4, 7–6	(Brazil) Nelson Aerts (Brazil) Danilo Marcelino	(Argentina) Gabriel Markus (Portugal) João Cunha e Silva	(Argentina) Daniel Orsanic (Argentina) Javier Frana (United States) MaliVai Washington (Canada) Andrew Sznajder
November 12	Tasmania Challenger; Tasmania, Australia $25,000 – hard – 32S/16D; Singles draw – Doubles draw	(Australia) Simon Youl; 7–6, 7–6	(Australia) Jamie Morgan	(New Zealand) Brett Steven (Australia) Johan Anderson	(Australia) Jason Cask (Australia) Carl Limberger (United States) Ryan Blake (Australia) Sandon Stolle
November 12	Tasmania Challenger; Tasmania, Australia $25,000 – hard – 32S/16D; Singles draw – Doubles draw	(Australia) Brett Custer (Australia) David Macpherson; 6–2, 6–7, 6–4	(New Zealand) Brett Steven (Australia) Sandon Stolle	(New Zealand) Brett Steven (Australia) Johan Anderson	(Australia) Jason Cask (Australia) Carl Limberger (United States) Ryan Blake (Australia) Sandon Stolle
November 12	The Hague Challenger; The Hague, Netherlands $100,000 – carpet (I) – 32S/16D; Singles draw – Doubles draw	(Sweden) Anders Järryd; 6–1, 6–2	(Czechoslovakia) Marián Vajda	(Spain) Javier Sánchez (Germany) Patrik Kühnen	(Sweden) Magnus Gustafsson (Germany) Udo Riglewski (United Kingdom) Jeremy Bates (Czechoslovakia) Karel Nováček
November 12	The Hague Challenger; The Hague, Netherlands $100,000 – carpet (I) – 32S/16D; Singles draw – Doubles draw	(Netherlands) Michiel Schapers (Netherlands) Jan Siemerink; 6–3, 7–5	(Germany) Alexander Mronz (Soviet Union) Andrei Olhovskiy	(Spain) Javier Sánchez (Germany) Patrik Kühnen	(Sweden) Magnus Gustafsson (Germany) Udo Riglewski (United Kingdom) Jeremy Bates (Czechoslovakia) Karel Nováček
November 19	No tournaments scheduled.				
November 26	Bossonnens Challenger; Bossonnens, Switzerland $50,000 – hard (I) – 32S/16D; Singles draw – Doubles draw	(Italy) Cristiano Caratti; 6–4, 3–6, 7–6	(Netherlands) Michiel Schapers	(Germany) Markus Rackl (Italy) Diego Nargiso	(Belgium) Eduardo Masso (The Bahamas) Roger Smith (France) Cédric Pioline (Sweden) Peter Nyborg
November 26	Bossonnens Challenger; Bossonnens, Switzerland $50,000 – hard (I) – 32S/16D; Singles draw – Doubles draw	(Netherlands) Michiel Schapers (The Bahamas) Roger Smith; 6–2, 7–6	(Sweden) Henrik Holm (Sweden) Nils Holm	(Germany) Markus Rackl (Italy) Diego Nargiso	(Belgium) Eduardo Masso (The Bahamas) Roger Smith (France) Cédric Pioline (Sweden) Peter Nyborg
November 26	Munich Challenger; Munich, Germany $50,000 – carpet (I) – 32S/16D; Singles draw – Doubles draw	(Sweden) Anders Järryd; 6–2, 6–4	(Netherlands) Richard Krajicek	(Germany) Markus Zoecke (Sweden) Johan Carlsson	(Netherlands) Jan Siemerink (Sweden) Niclas Kroon (Czechoslovakia) Martin Střelba (Germany) Martin Sinner
November 26	Munich Challenger; Munich, Germany $50,000 – carpet (I) – 32S/16D; Singles draw – Doubles draw	(Germany) Jens Wöhrmann (Germany) Markus Zoecke; 6–4, 6–3	(Soviet Union) Dimitri Poliakov (Socialist Federal Republic of Yugoslavia) Slobodan Vojinovic	(Germany) Markus Zoecke (Sweden) Johan Carlsson	(Netherlands) Jan Siemerink (Sweden) Niclas Kroon (Czechoslovakia) Martin Střelba (Germany) Martin Sinner

=== December ===
Week of	Tournament	Champions	Runners-up	Semifinalists	Quarterfinalists
December 3	Guam Challenger; Guam, Guam $25,000 – hard – 32S/16D; Singles draw – Doubles draw	(Australia) Jamie Morgan; 6–2, 7–6	(United States) Chuck Adams	(Canada) Glenn Michibata (United States) Steve DeVries	(United States) Francisco Montana (United Kingdom) Andrew Castle (United States) Matt Anger (United States) Mike Briggs
December 3	Guam Challenger; Guam, Guam $25,000 – hard – 32S/16D; Singles draw – Doubles draw	(United States) Steve DeVries (United States) Ted Scherman; 6–1, 3–6, 7–6	(United States) Matt Anger (United Kingdom) Andrew Castle	(Canada) Glenn Michibata (United States) Steve DeVries	(United States) Francisco Montana (United Kingdom) Andrew Castle (United States) Matt Anger (United States) Mike Briggs
December 10	No tournaments scheduled.				
December 17	Hong Kong Challenger; Hong Kong $25,000 – hard – 32S/16D; Singles draw – Doubles draw	(Germany) Christian Saceanu; 6–4, 6–1	(Philippines) Felix Barrientos	(Italy) Gianluca Pozzi (Australia) Jamie Morgan	(United States) Chuck Adams (Germany) Christian Geyer (United States) Bruce Steel (Sweden) David Engel
December 17	Hong Kong Challenger; Hong Kong $25,000 – hard – 32S/16D; Singles draw – Doubles draw	(Australia) Neil Borwick (Kenya) Paul Wekesa; 6–2, 6–2	(Germany) Christian Geyer (Germany) Christian Saceanu	(Italy) Gianluca Pozzi (Australia) Jamie Morgan	(United States) Chuck Adams (Germany) Christian Geyer (United States) Bruce Steel (Sweden) David Engel

== Statistical information ==
These tables present the number of singles (S) and doubles (D) titles won by each player and each nation during the season, within all the tournament categories of the 1990 ATP Challenger Series. The players/nations are sorted by: 1) total number of titles (a doubles title won by two players representing the same nation counts as only one win for the nation); 2) a singles > doubles hierarchy; 3) alphabetical order (by family names for players).

=== Titles won by player ===
Total	Player	S	D
4	Christian Miniussi (ARG)	2	2
4	Jaime Oncins (BRA)	2	2
4	Francisco Roig (ESP)	1	3
3	Pedro Rebolledo (CHI)	3	0
3	Christian Saceanu (FRG)	3	0
3	João Cunha e Silva (POR)	2	1
3	Anders Järryd (SWE)	2	1
3	Guillaume Raoux (FRA)	2	1
3	Horst Skoff (AUT)	2	1
3	Olivier Delaître (FRA)	1	2
3	Steve DeVries (USA)	1	2
3	Henrik Holm (SWE)	1	2
3	Dimitri Poliakov (URS)	1	2
3	Tomáš Anzari (TCH)	0	3
3	Neil Borwick (AUS)	0	3
3	Hendrik Jan Davids (NED)	0	3
3	David Lewis (NZL)	0	3
3	David Rikl (TCH)	0	3
2	Cristiano Caratti (ITA)	2	0
2	Luis Herrera (MEX)	2	0
2	Richard Krajicek (NED)	2	0
2	Thomas Muster (AUT)	2	0
2	Martin Sinner (FRG)	2	0
2	Jeremy Bates (GBR)	1	1
2	Carlos Costa (ESP)	1	1
2	Ctislav Doseděl (TCH)	1	1
2	Rodolphe Gilbert (FRA)	1	1
2	Marcos Górriz (ESP)	1	1
2	Mark Keil (USA)	1	1
2	Mark Koevermans (NED)	1	1
2	Cássio Motta (BRA)	1	1
2	Nduka Odizor (NGR)	1	1
2	Ricki Osterthun (FRG)	1	1
2	Jeff Brown (USA)	0	2
2	Brett Custer (AUS)	0	2
2	Jacco Eltingh (NED)	0	2
2	Doug Flach (USA)	0	2
2	Ken Flach (USA)	0	2
2	Javier Frana (ARG)	0	2
2	Eduardo Masso (BEL)	0	2
2	Andrei Olhovskiy (URS)	0	2
2	Scott Patridge (USA)	0	2
2	Michiel Schapers (NED)	0	2
2	Jan Siemerink (NED)	0	2
2	Roger Smith (BAH)	0	2
2	Branislav Stankovič (TCH)	0	2
2	Richard Vogel (TCH)	0	2
2	Paul Wekesa (KEN)	0	2
1	Christer Allgårdh (SWE)	1	0
1	Roberto Argüello (ARG)	1	0
1	Marcelo Filippini (URU)	1	0
1	Renzo Furlan (ITA)	1	0
1	Christian Geyer (FRG)	1	0
1	Tommy Ho (USA)	1	0
1	Álvaro Jordan (COL)	1	0
1	Ramesh Krishnan (IND)	1	0
1	Magnus Larsson (SWE)	1	0
1	Boris Laustroer (FRG)	1	0
1	Fernando Luna (ESP)	1	0
1	Francisco Maciel (MEX)	1	0
1	Luiz Mattar (BRA)	1	0
1	Jamie Morgan (AUS)	1	0
1	Alexander Mronz (FRG)	1	0
1	Gary Muller (RSA)	1	0
1	Miguel Nido (PUR)	1	0
1	Bruno Orešar (YUG)	1	0
1	Guillermo Pérez Roldán (ARG)	1	0
1	Cédric Pioline (FRA)	1	0
1	Fabrice Santoro (FRA)	1	0
1	Bryan Shelton (USA)	1	0
1	Milan Šrejber (TCH)	1	0
1	Brett Steven (NZL)	1	0
1	Jeff Tarango (USA)	1	0
1	Thierry Tulasne (FRA)	1	0
1	Raviv Weidenfeld (ISR)	1	0
1	Simon Youl (AUS)	1	0
1	Nelson Aerts (BRA)	0	1
1	Pablo Albano (ARG)	0	1
1	Zeeshan Ali (IND)	0	1
1	Eric Amend (USA)	0	1
1	Johan Anderson (AUS)	0	1
1	José Luis Aparisi (ESP)	0	1
1	Juan Carlos Báguena (ESP)	0	1
1	Mansour Bahrami (IRN)	0	1
1	Peter Ballauff (FRG)	0	1
1	Marius Barnard (RSA)	0	1
1	Eduardo Bengoechea (ARG)	0	1
1	Gilad Bloom (ISR)	0	1
1	Karsten Braasch (FRG)	0	1
1	Cristian Brandi (ITA)	0	1
1	Mike Briggs (USA)	0	1
1	Nick Brown (GBR)	0	1
1	Shelby Cannon (USA)	0	1
1	Jonathan Canter (USA)	0	1
1	Johan Carlsson (SWE)	0	1
1	Andrew Castle (GBR)	0	1
1	Massimo Cierro (ITA)	0	1
1	Josef Čihák (TCH)	0	1
1	Jose Clavet (ESP)	0	1
1	Simone Colombo (ITA)	0	1
1	José Daher (BRA)	0	1
1	Martin Damm (TCH)	0	1
1	Horacio de la Peña (ARG)	0	1
1	Bruce Derlin (NZL)	0	1
1	Peter Doohan (AUS)	0	1
1	Ģirts Dzelde (URS)	0	1
1	Wayne Ferreira (RSA)	0	1
1	Nick Fulwood (GBR)	0	1
1	Patrick Galbraith (USA)	0	1
1	Steve Guy (NZL)	0	1
1	Mauricio Hadad (COL)	0	1
1	David Harkness (USA)	0	1
1	Brent Haygarth (RSA)	0	1
1	Nils Holm (SWE)	0	1
1	Alexis Hombrecher (USA)	0	1
1	Marcelo Ingaramo (ARG)	0	1
1	Ville Jansson (SWE)	0	1
1	Ivan Kley (BRA)	0	1
1	Leonardo Lavalle (MEX)	0	1
1	John Letts (USA)	0	1
1	Germán López (ESP)	0	1
1	Jorge Lozano (MEX)	0	1
1	Richard Lubner (RSA)	0	1
1	Gustavo Luza (ARG)	0	1
1	David Macpherson (AUS)	0	1
1	Scott Melville (USA)	0	1
1	Tom Mercer (USA)	0	1
1	Francisco Montana (USA)	0	1
1	Alfonso Mora (VEN)	0	1
1	Federico Mordegan (ITA)	0	1
1	Piet Norval (RSA)	0	1
1	Peter Nyborg (SWE)	0	1
1	Menno Oosting (NED)	0	1
1	Olli Rahnasto (FIN)	0	1
1	Mario Rincón (COL)	0	1
1	Fernando Roese (BRA)	0	1
1	Ted Scherman (USA)	0	1
1	Vicente Solves (ESP)	0	1
1	Cyril Suk (TCH)	0	1
1	Tobias Svantesson (SWE)	0	1
1	Andrew Sznajder (CAN)	0	1
1	Lars-Anders Wahlgren (SWE)	0	1
1	Jens Wöhrmann (FRG)	0	1
1	Markus Zoecke (FRG)	0	1

=== Titles won by nation ===
Total	Nation	S	D
19	United States (USA)	5	14
13	West Germany (FRG)	9	4
12	Sweden (SWE)	5	7
11	Argentina (ARG)	4	7
10	France (FRA)	7	3
10	Spain (ESP)	4	6
10	Netherlands (NED)	3	7
10	Czechoslovakia (TCH)	2	8
9	Brazil (BRA)	4	5
8	Australia (AUS)	2	6
6	New Zealand (NZL)	1	5
5	Austria (AUT)	4	1
5	Italy (ITA)	3	2
5	South Africa (RSA)	1	4
5	Soviet Union (URS)	1	4
4	Mexico (MEX)	3	1
4	Great Britain (GBR)	1	3
3	Chile (CHI)	3	0
3	Portugal (POR)	2	1
2	Colombia (COL)	1	1
2	India (IND)	1	1
2	Israel (ISR)	1	1
2	Nigeria (NGR)	1	1
2	Bahamas (BAH)	1	1
2	Belgium (BEL)	0	2
2	Kenya (KEN)	0	2
1	Puerto Rico (PUR)	1	0
1	Uruguay (URU)	1	0
1	Yugoslavia (YUG)	1	0
1	Canada (CAN)	0	1
1	Finland (FIN)	0	1
1	Iran (IRN)	0	1
1	Venezuela (VEN)	0	1

== See also ==
- 1990 ATP Tour
- 1990 WTA Tour
- Association of Tennis Professionals
- International Tennis Federation
