= 1991 Wimbledon Championships – Men's singles qualifying =

Men's singles qualifying
- 1991 Wimbledon Championships

Events
Singles	men	women		boys	girls
Doubles	men	women	mixed	boys	girls
WC Singles	men	women	quad
WC Doubles	men	women	quad
Legends	men	women	seniors

Qualification
Singles	men	women
Doubles	men	women	mixed
- Wimbledon Championships

Players and pairs who neither have high enough rankings nor receive wild cards may participate in a qualifying tournament held one week before the annual Wimbledon Tennis Championships.

== Seeds ==
1. (France) Arnaud Boetsch (qualified)
2. (United States) Chuck Adams (second round)
3. (Soviet Union) Andrei Olhovskiy (qualifying competition, lucky loser)
4. (Sweden) Henrik Holm (qualified)
5. (Argentina) Javier Frana (qualified)
6. (Spain) Francisco Roig (second round)
7. (Italy) Diego Nargiso (qualifying competition, lucky loser)
8. (United States) Bryan Shelton (second round)
9. (Brazil) Danilo Marcelino (qualified)
10. (Brazil) Fernando Roese (qualified)
11. (Australia) Mark Kratzmann (qualified)
12. (United States) Glenn Layendecker (qualified)
13. (Australia) Jamie Morgan (second round)
14. (Argentina) Daniel Orsanic (qualified)
15. (Sweden) Niclas Kroon (qualifying competition, lucky loser)
16. (Australia) Neil Borwick (second round)
17. (Australia) Simon Youl (second round)
18. (United States) Brian Garrow (second round)
19. (United States) Francisco Montana (first round)
20. (South Africa) Marcos Ondruska (first round)
21. (United States) Todd Martin (first round)
22. (United States) John Stimpson (second round)
23. (Canada) Martin Wostenholme (first round)
24. (Canada) Martin Laurendeau (qualifying competition, lucky loser)
25. (New Zealand) Brett Steven (second round)
26. (Socialist Federal Republic of Yugoslavia) Slobodan Živojinović (qualified)
27. (Italy) Gianluca Pozzi (qualified)
28. (Venezuela) Maurice Ruah (qualifying competition, lucky loser)
29. (United States) Steve Bryan (qualifying competition)
30. (Philippines) Felix Barrientos (first round)
31. (Australia) Carl Limberger (qualifying competition)
32. (Australia) Sandon Stolle (qualified)

== Qualifiers ==
1. (France) Arnaud Boetsch
2. (Australia) Sandon Stolle
3. (Czechoslovakia) Richard Vogel
4. (Sweden) Henrik Holm
5. (Argentina) Javier Frana
6. (Italy) Gianluca Pozzi
7. (Socialist Federal Republic of Yugoslavia) Slobodan Živojinović
8. (United States) Mark Keil
9. (Brazil) Danilo Marcelino
10. (Brazil) Fernando Roese
11. (Australia) Mark Kratzmann
12. (United States) Glenn Layendecker
13. (Canada) Glenn Michibata
14. (Argentina) Daniel Orsanic
15. (Australia) Broderick Dyke
16. (United States) Johan Kriek

== Lucky losers ==
1. (Soviet Union) Andrei Olhovskiy
2. (Venezuela) Maurice Ruah
3. (Italy) Diego Nargiso
4. (Canada) Martin Laurendeau
5. (Sweden) Niclas Kroon

== Qualifying draw ==
=== First qualifier ===
First round
1	(France) Arnaud Boetsch	3	7^{7}	6
(United States) Paul Annacone	6	6^{3}	2
(United States) Richard Schmidt	7	7^{9}
WC	(United Kingdom) Sean Cole	5	6^{7}
(United Kingdom) Chris Bailey	6^{4}	7^{8}	9
WC	(United Kingdom) Paul Robinson	7^{7}	6^{6}	7
(United States) Steve DeVries	6^{4}	4
31	(Australia) Carl Limberger	7^{7}	6

Second round
1	(France) Arnaud Boetsch	3	6	6
(United States) Richard Schmidt	6	3	2
(United Kingdom) Chris Bailey	3	3
31	(Australia) Carl Limberger	6	6

Qualifying competition
1	(France) Arnaud Boetsch	6	6	6
31	(Australia) Carl Limberger	2	2	3

=== Second qualifier ===
First round
2	(United States) Chuck Adams	6	6
(Italy) Francesco Michelotti	3	4
(Israel) Amit Naor	6^{7}	0^{r}
(Kenya) Paul Wekesa	7^{9}	2
(Australia) Andrew Kratzmann	7^{7}	6
(Morocco) Younes El Aynaoui	6^{5}	2
(Argentina) Francisco Yunis	2	3
32	(Australia) Sandon Stolle	6	6

Second round
2	(United States) Chuck Adams	5	4
(Kenya) Paul Wekesa	7	6
(Australia) Andrew Kratzmann	1	1
32	(Australia) Sandon Stolle	6	6

Qualifying competition
(Kenya) Paul Wekesa	3	6	4	3
32	(Australia) Sandon Stolle	6	3	6	6

=== Third qualifier ===
First round
3	(Soviet Union) Andrei Olhovskiy	6	6
(Germany) Florian Krumrey	4	3
(United States) Ken Flach	7^{7}	6
(United States) David Witt	6^{3}	3
(Germany) David Prinosil	6	6
(Ivory Coast) Clement N'Goran	1	3
(Czechoslovakia) Richard Vogel	6	1	6
30	(Philippines) Felix Barrientos	1	6	2

Second round
3	(Soviet Union) Andrei Olhovskiy	6	7^{7}
(United States) Ken Flach	4	6^{4}
(Germany) David Prinosil	2	3
(Czechoslovakia) Richard Vogel	6	6

Qualifying competition
3	(Soviet Union) Andrei Olhovskiy	3	4	6	4
(Czechoslovakia) Richard Vogel	6	6	3	6

=== Fourth qualifier ===
First round
4	(Sweden) Henrik Holm	7	6^{5}	9
(United States) Matt Anger	5	7^{7}	7
(Denmark) Frederik Fetterlein	6^{1}	2
(Germany) Rüdiger Haas	7^{7}	6
(India) Srinivasan Vasudevan	6	6
(Germany) Markus Zillner	2	2
(United States) Alex Reichel	1	4
29	(United States) Steve Bryan	6	6

Second round
4	(Sweden) Henrik Holm	6	6
(Germany) Rüdiger Haas	3	4
(India) Srinivasan Vasudevan	2	7^{7}	1
29	(United States) Steve Bryan	6	6^{5}	6

Qualifying competition
4	(Sweden) Henrik Holm	7^{7}	6	3	6
29	(United States) Steve Bryan	6^{5}	3	6	4

=== Fifth qualifier ===
First round
5	(Argentina) Javier Frana	6	6
(Czechoslovakia) Branislav Stankovič	4	4
(United States) Brian Joelson	4	6^{3}
(South Africa) Richard Lubner	6	7^{7}
(Sweden) Peter Nyborg	3	6	6
WC	(United Kingdom) Andrew Richardson	6	3	4
(France) Stéphane Sansoni	4	4
28	(Venezuela) Maurice Ruah	6	6

Second round
5	(Argentina) Javier Frana	6	6
(South Africa) Richard Lubner	2	2
(Sweden) Peter Nyborg	4	3
28	(Venezuela) Maurice Ruah	6	6

Qualifying competition
5	(Argentina) Javier Frana	7^{10}	6	6
28	(Venezuela) Maurice Ruah	6^{8}	3	2

=== Sixth qualifier ===
First round
6	(Spain) Francisco Roig	6	6
WC	(United Kingdom) Alex Rouse	3	4
(United States) Leif Shiras	6	6^{5}	6
(France) Stéphane Simian	3	7^{7}	8
(Argentina) Pablo Albano	6	2	6
(New Zealand) Bruce Derlin	4	6	4
(Netherlands) Tom Nijssen	2	5
27	(Italy) Gianluca Pozzi	6	7

Second round
6	(Spain) Francisco Roig	1	2
(France) Stéphane Simian	6	6
(Argentina) Pablo Albano	3	4
27	(Italy) Gianluca Pozzi	6	6

Qualifying competition
(France) Stéphane Simian	4	3	4
27	(Italy) Gianluca Pozzi	6	6	6

=== Seventh qualifier ===
First round
7	(Italy) Diego Nargiso	6	7^{7}
(Netherlands) Sander Groen	4	6^{4}
(Brazil) César Kist	7^{10}	4	6
WC	(United Kingdom) David Ison	6^{8}	6	1
(Puerto Rico) Miguel Nido	3	6	7
(United States) Kenny Thorne	6	4	9
(Germany) Bernd Karbacher	2	3
26	(Socialist Federal Republic of Yugoslavia) Slobodan Živojinović	6	6

Second round
7	(Italy) Diego Nargiso	7^{7}	6
(Brazil) César Kist	6^{4}	1
(United States) Kenny Thorne	7^{9}	1	4
26	(Socialist Federal Republic of Yugoslavia) Slobodan Živojinović	6^{7}	6	6

Qualifying competition
7	(Italy) Diego Nargiso	6^{4}	6^{2}	6	6	3
26	(Socialist Federal Republic of Yugoslavia) Slobodan Živojinović	7^{7}	7^{7}	3	4	6

=== Eighth qualifier ===
First round
8	(United States) Bryan Shelton	6	6
(United States) Jonathan Canter	3	4
(United States) Mark Keil	6^{5}	7^{7}	8
(United States) Tim Trigueiro	7^{7}	6^{0}	6
(Czechoslovakia) Cyril Suk	7^{7}	7^{7}
(Sweden) Tobias Svantesson	6^{4}	6^{5}
(Argentina) Gustavo Garetto	4	7	2
25	(New Zealand) Brett Steven	6	5	6

Second round
8	(United States) Bryan Shelton	6	4	3
(United States) Mark Keil	3	6	6
(Czechoslovakia) Cyril Suk	3	6	6
25	(New Zealand) Brett Steven	6	4	3

Qualifying competition
(United States) Mark Keil	7^{7}	6	6
(Czechoslovakia) Cyril Suk	6^{4}	3	2

=== Ninth qualifier ===
First round
9	(Brazil) Danilo Marcelino	6	6
(United States) Scott Melville	4	3
(Morocco) Karim Alami	5	6	2
(Netherlands) Menno Oosting	7	0	6
(Brazil) Nelson Aerts	7^{9}	6^{2}	4
(Argentina) Juan Garat	6^{7}	7^{7}	6
(South Africa) Michael Robertson	6	6
23	(Canada) Martin Wostenholme	4	4

Second round
9	(Brazil) Danilo Marcelino	6	3	17
(Netherlands) Menno Oosting	3	6	15
(Argentina) Juan Garat	5	7^{7}	3
(South Africa) Michael Robertson	7	6^{2}	6

Qualifying competition
9	(Brazil) Danilo Marcelino	7^{12}	7^{7}	6
(South Africa) Michael Robertson	6^{10}	6^{1}	3

=== Tenth qualifier ===
First round
10	(Brazil) Fernando Roese	6	6
(Romania) Mihnea-Ion Năstase	3	0
(United States) Joey Rive	6^{8}	6^{4}
(India) Leander Paes	7^{10}	7^{7}
(United States) Greg Failla	7	6
(France) Stéphane Grenier	5	4
(Hungary) Sándor Noszály	4	4
24	(Canada) Martin Laurendeau	6	6

Second round
10	(Brazil) Fernando Roese	5	6	9
(India) Leander Paes	7	4	7
(United States) Greg Failla	4	4
24	(Canada) Martin Laurendeau	6	6

Qualifying competition
10	(Brazil) Fernando Roese	5	1	6	6	6
24	(Canada) Martin Laurendeau	7	6	3	4	4

=== Eleventh qualifier ===
First round
11	(Australia) Mark Kratzmann	6	6
(Belgium) Xavier Daufresne	3	1
(United Kingdom) Nick Fulwood	6^{5}	4
(South Africa) Danie Visser	7^{7}	6
WC	(United Kingdom) Andrew Foster	3	6^{0}
(United States) Bruce Steel	6	7^{7}
(Soviet Union) Ģirts Dzelde	6	6
21	(United States) Todd Martin	4	4

Second round
11	(Australia) Mark Kratzmann	4	6	6
(South Africa) Danie Visser	6	0	3
(United States) Bruce Steel	6	6
(Soviet Union) Ģirts Dzelde	3	2

Qualifying competition
11	(Australia) Mark Kratzmann	6^{5}	7^{9}	6	6
(United States) Bruce Steel	7^{7}	6^{7}	2	4

=== Twelfth qualifier ===
First round
12	(United States) Glenn Layendecker	7^{7}	6
(Sweden) Thomas Enqvist	6^{3}	2
(Nigeria) Nduka Odizor	3	7^{8}	6
(United States) Kent Kinnear	6	6^{6}	4
(United States) T. J. Middleton	6	6
(Germany) Frank Dennhardt	3	3
(United States) George Bezecny	2	4
22	(United States) John Stimpson	6	6

Second round
12	(United States) Glenn Layendecker	7^{7}	6
(Nigeria) Nduka Odizor	6^{3}	1
(United States) T. J. Middleton	6	7^{7}
22	(United States) John Stimpson	4	6^{0}

Qualifying competition
12	(United States) Glenn Layendecker	4	6	7	6
(United States) T. J. Middleton	6	3	5	1

=== Thirteenth qualifier ===
First round
13	(Australia) Jamie Morgan	6	6
(Australia) Jason Cask	3	4
(Belgium) Libor Pimek	6^{11}	6	6
(United States) Otis Smith	7^{13}	3	2
(Puerto Rico) Juan Ríos	6	6^{4}	4
(Canada) Glenn Michibata	4	7^{7}	6
(United Kingdom) Paul Hand	7^{7}	7^{7}
19	(United States) Francisco Montana	6^{5}	6^{5}

Second round
13	(Australia) Jamie Morgan	6	4	8
(Belgium) Libor Pimek	4	6	10
(Canada) Glenn Michibata	7^{7}	7^{7}
(United Kingdom) Paul Hand	6^{5}	6^{5}

Qualifying competition
(Belgium) Libor Pimek	6	6^{4}	2	7^{9}	5
(Canada) Glenn Michibata	4	7^{7}	6	6^{7}	7

=== Fourteenth qualifier ===
First round
14	(Argentina) Daniel Orsanic	6	7^{7}
(Peru) Alejandro Aramburú	0	6^{3}
(United States) Scott Patridge	6	7^{7}
WC	(United Kingdom) Laurence Matthews	4	6^{0}
(Chile) Felipe Rivera	4	1
(New Zealand) Steve Guy	6	6
(The Bahamas) Roger Smith	6	6
20	(South Africa) Marcos Ondruska	2	3

Second round
14	(Argentina) Daniel Orsanic	6	3	6
(United States) Scott Patridge	4	6	3
(New Zealand) Steve Guy	2	6	7
(The Bahamas) Roger Smith	6	3	5

Qualifying competition
14	(Argentina) Daniel Orsanic	7^{7}	6	3	7^{8}
(New Zealand) Steve Guy	6^{3}	3	6	6^{6}

=== Fifteenth qualifier ===
First round
15	(Sweden) Niclas Kroon	4	7^{7}	6
(Venezuela) Carlos Claverie	6	6^{2}	4
(United Kingdom) Stephen Botfield	7^{7}	5	8
(Australia) John Fitzgerald	6^{4}	7	6
(Australia) Broderick Dyke	6	6
(Argentina) Roberto Argüello	0	3
(Zimbabwe) Byron Black	1	4
18	(United States) Brian Garrow	6	6

Second round
15	(Sweden) Niclas Kroon	6	6
(United Kingdom) Stephen Botfield	3	4
(Australia) Broderick Dyke	6	6
18	(United States) Brian Garrow	4	2

Qualifying competition
15	(Sweden) Niclas Kroon	5	4	4
(Australia) Broderick Dyke	7	6	6

=== Sixteenth qualifier ===
First round
16	(Australia) Neil Borwick	6	3	6
(Israel) Raviv Weidenfeld	3	6	3
(Czechoslovakia) Martin Damm	6	3	3
WC	(United States) Johan Kriek	3	6	6
WC	(United Kingdom) Miles Maclagan	3	6	9
(Italy) Ugo Colombini	6	3	7
(United States) Mark Kaplan	4	6	3
17	(Australia) Simon Youl	6	4	6

Second round
16	(Australia) Neil Borwick	4	5
WC	(United States) Johan Kriek	6	7
WC	(United Kingdom) Miles Maclagan	6	6
17	(Australia) Simon Youl	3	4

Qualifying competition
WC	(United States) Johan Kriek	7^{7}	6	6
WC	(United Kingdom) Miles Maclagan	6^{2}	3	2
