= 1991 Wimbledon Championships – Men's doubles qualifying =

Men's doubles qualifying
- 1991 Wimbledon Championships

Events
Singles	men	women		boys	girls
Doubles	men	women	mixed	boys	girls
WC Singles	men	women	quad
WC Doubles	men	women	quad
Legends	men	women	seniors

Qualification
Singles	men	women
Doubles	men	women	mixed
- Wimbledon Championships

Players and pairs who neither have high enough rankings nor receive wild cards may participate in a qualifying tournament held one week before the annual Wimbledon Tennis Championships.

== Seeds ==
1. (United States) Jonathan Canter / (Nigeria) Nduka Odizor (second round)
2. n/a
3. (South Africa) David Adams / (Soviet Union) Ģirts Dzelde (qualified, Lucky losers)
4. (New Zealand) Bruce Derlin / (New Zealand) Steve Guy (second round)
5. (Canada) Martin Laurendeau / (Brazil) Fernando Roese (qualified)
6. (United States) Alexis Hombrecher / (Romania) Mihnea-Ion Năstase (second round)
7. (Sweden) Henrik Holm / (Sweden) Peter Nyborg (qualified)
8. (United States) Mark Keil / (United States) Dave Randall (second round)
9. (Australia) Neil Borwick / (Australia) Andrew Kratzmann (qualified)
10. (South Africa) Brent Haygarth / (South Africa) Byron Talbot (qualified)

== Qualifiers ==
1. (Australia) Neil Borwick / (Australia) Andrew Kratzmann
2. (South Africa) Brent Haygarth / (South Africa) Byron Talbot
3. (Zimbabwe) Byron Black / (United States) T. J. Middleton
4. (Sweden) Henrik Holm / (Sweden) Peter Nyborg (qualified)
5. (Canada) Martin Laurendeau / (Brazil) Fernando Roese

== Lucky losers ==
1. (South Africa) David Adams / (Soviet Union) Ģirts Dzelde

== Qualifying draw ==
=== First qualifier ===
First round
1	(United States) Jonathan Canter (Nigeria) Nduka Odizor	6	7
WC	(United Kingdom) Chris Bailey (United Kingdom) Ulli Nganga	2	5
(France) Arnaud Boetsch (France) Guillaume Raoux	6	6
(South Africa) Richard Lubner (United States) Francisco Montana	3	2
(Sweden) Niclas Kroon (Sweden) Nicklas Kulti	6	4	4
(Netherlands) Sander Groen (Germany) David Prinosil	2	6	6
(South Africa) Lan Bale (Australia) Bret Richardson	6^{5}	6	3
9	(Australia) Neil Borwick (Australia) Andrew Kratzmann	7^{7}	3	6

Second round
1	(United States) Jonathan Canter (Nigeria) Nduka Odizor	3	4
(France) Arnaud Boetsch (France) Guillaume Raoux	6	6
(Netherlands) Sander Groen (Germany) David Prinosil	4	6	13
9	(Australia) Neil Borwick (Australia) Andrew Kratzmann	6	3	15

Qualifying competition
(France) Arnaud Boetsch (France) Guillaume Raoux	3	4	6	5
9	(Australia) Neil Borwick (Australia) Andrew Kratzmann	6	6	3	7

=== Second qualifier ===
First round
Alt	(United States) Greg Failla (United States) Kenny Thorne	5	6	3
(Puerto Rico) Miguel Nido (Argentina) Daniel Orsanic	7	4	6
(Canada) Chris Pridham (United States) Leif Shiras	7^{13}	6^{2}	6
(Australia) Jamie Morgan (Australia) Sandon Stolle	6^{11}	7^{7}	2
(Australia) Gavin Pfitzner (India) Srinivasan Vasudevan	2	7^{7}	4
(Australia) Grant Doyle (Australia) Joshua Eagle	6	6^{5}	6
(United States) Richard Schmidt (United States) Tim Trigueiro	4	4
10	(South Africa) Brent Haygarth (South Africa) Byron Talbot	6	6

Second round
(Puerto Rico) Miguel Nido (Argentina) Daniel Orsanic	6^{6}	6	6
(Canada) Chris Pridham (United States) Leif Shiras	7^{8}	3	8
(Australia) Grant Doyle (Australia) Joshua Eagle	6	6^{6}	1
10	(South Africa) Brent Haygarth (South Africa) Byron Talbot	3	7^{8}	6

Qualifying competition
(Canada) Chris Pridham (United States) Leif Shiras	6^{4}	3	1^{r}
10	(South Africa) Brent Haygarth (South Africa) Byron Talbot	7^{7}	6	3

=== Third qualifier ===
First round
3	(South Africa) David Adams (Soviet Union) Ģirts Dzelde	6	6
(Venezuela) Carlos Claverie (Venezuela) Maurice Ruah	3	2
(South Africa) Michael Robertson (United States) John Stimpson	6	6
(United States) Todd Martin (United States) Bruce Steel	4	2
(Zimbabwe) Byron Black (United States) T. J. Middleton	7^{10}	6
WC	(United Kingdom) Jonathan Haycock (United Kingdom) Jeffrey Hunter	6^{8}	3
(United States) Chuck Adams (United States) Steve Bryan	6	4	4
8	(United States) Mark Keil (United States) Dave Randall	4	6	6

Second round
3	(South Africa) David Adams (Soviet Union) Ģirts Dzelde	6	6
(South Africa) Michael Robertson (United States) John Stimpson	1	3
(Zimbabwe) Byron Black (United States) T. J. Middleton	6	7^{7}
8	(United States) Mark Keil (United States) Dave Randall	4	6^{2}

Qualifying competition
3	(South Africa) David Adams (Soviet Union) Ģirts Dzelde	6^{6}	1	6^{2}
(Zimbabwe) Byron Black (United States) T. J. Middleton	7^{8}	6	7^{7}

=== Fourth qualifier ===
First round
4	(New Zealand) Bruce Derlin (New Zealand) Steve Guy	6	7
(United States) Matt Anger (New Zealand) Brett Steven	4	5
(South Africa) Mark Kaplan (Israel) Raviv Weidenfeld	6	6^{5}	6
(United Kingdom) Sean Cole (Republic of Ireland) Eoin Collins	4	7^{7}	8
(United States) Eric Amend (United States) Luke Jensen	4	6^{9}
(Australia) Wayne Arthurs (Australia) Carl Limberger	6	7^{11}
(United Kingdom) Darren Kirk (United Kingdom) Laurence Matthews	2	3
7	(Sweden) Henrik Holm (Sweden) Peter Nyborg	6	6

Second round
4	(New Zealand) Bruce Derlin (New Zealand) Steve Guy	7^{8}	4	6
(United Kingdom) Sean Cole (Republic of Ireland) Eoin Collins	6^{7}	6	8
(Australia) Wayne Arthurs (Australia) Carl Limberger	6	6^{5}	4
7	(Sweden) Henrik Holm (Sweden) Peter Nyborg	1	7^{7}	6

Qualifying competition
(United Kingdom) Sean Cole (Republic of Ireland) Eoin Collins	6^{4}	3	6	5
7	(Sweden) Henrik Holm (Sweden) Peter Nyborg	7^{7}	6	2	7

=== Fifth qualifier ===
First round
5	(Canada) Martin Laurendeau (Brazil) Fernando Roese	7^{7}	6
(India) Mark Ferreira (India) Rohit Rajpal	6^{3}	1
(Australia) Roger Rasheed (United States) Otis Smith	6^{5}	6^{5}
(United States) Brian Joelson (United States) Ron Ward	7^{7}	7^{7}
(Italy) Ugo Colombini (Italy) Gianluca Pozzi	6	6
WC	(United Kingdom) Colin Beecher (United Kingdom) Andrew Foster	1	4
(United States) Paul Koscielski (France) Stéphane Simian	2	3
6	(United States) Alexis Hombrecher (Romania) Mihnea-Ion Năstase	6	6

Second round
5	(Canada) Martin Laurendeau (Brazil) Fernando Roese	6	6
(United States) Brian Joelson (United States) Ron Ward	2	3
(Italy) Ugo Colombini (Italy) Gianluca Pozzi	7^{7}	4	6
6	(United States) Alexis Hombrecher (Romania) Mihnea-Ion Năstase	6^{4}	6	2

Qualifying competition
5	(Canada) Martin Laurendeau (Brazil) Fernando Roese	6	4	7^{7}	7^{7}
(Italy) Ugo Colombini (Italy) Gianluca Pozzi	3	6	6^{5}	6^{5}
