= 1991 Wimbledon Championships – Mixed doubles qualifying =

Mixed doubles qualifying
- 1991 Wimbledon Championships

Events
Singles	men	women		boys	girls
Doubles	men	women	mixed	boys	girls
WC Singles	men	women	quad
WC Doubles	men	women	quad
Legends	men	women	seniors

Qualification
Singles	men	women
Doubles	men	women	mixed
- Wimbledon Championships

Players and pairs who neither have high enough rankings nor receive wild cards may participate in a qualifying tournament held one week before the annual Wimbledon Tennis Championships.

== Seeds ==
1. (Australia) Mark Woodforde / (United States) Amy Frazier (qualifying competition, lucky losers)
2. (Soviet Union) Andrei Olhovskiy / (Soviet Union) Eugenia Maniokova (first round)
3. (United States) Mark Keil / (Mexico) Lupita Novelo (qualifying competition)
4. (Brazil) Nelson Aerts / (Uruguay) Patricia Miller (second round)
5. (New Zealand) Bruce Derlin / (Australia) Kristine Radford (second round)
6. (Nigeria) Nduka Odizor / (Sweden) Maria Lindström (first round)

== Qualifiers ==
1. (Australia) Sandon Stolle / (France) Noëlle van Lottum
2. (Australia) Andrew Kratzmann / (Australia) Kerry-Anne Guse
3. (United States) Eric Amend / (United States) Heather Ludloff

== Lucky losers ==
1. (Australia) Mark Woodforde / (United States) Amy Frazier
2. (South Africa) Lan Bale / (Netherlands) Amy van Buuren
3. (Australia) Jamie Morgan / (Australia) Danielle Jones

== Qualifying draw ==
=== First qualifier ===
First round
1	(Australia) Mark Woodforde (United States) Amy Frazier	6	6
(United Kingdom) Sean Cole (United Kingdom) Monique Javer	4	1
(Romania) Mihnea-Ion Năstase (United States) Jessica Emmons	5	7	5
(Israel) Raviv Weidenfeld (Israel) Ilana Berger	7	5	7
(India) Mark Ferreira (Japan) Ei Iida	4	6^{2}
(United States) Francisco Montana (Netherlands) Ingelise Driehuis	6	7^{7}
(Australia) Sandon Stolle (France) Noëlle van Lottum	6	7^{7}
6	(Nigeria) Nduka Odizor (Sweden) Maria Lindström	2	6^{3}

Second round
1	(Australia) Mark Woodforde (United States) Amy Frazier	6	6
(Israel) Raviv Weidenfeld (Israel) Ilana Berger	4	3
(United States) Francisco Montana (Netherlands) Ingelise Driehuis	6^{1}	6^{4}
(Australia) Sandon Stolle (France) Noëlle van Lottum	7^{7}	7^{7}

Qualifying competition
1	(Australia) Mark Woodforde (United States) Amy Frazier	6^{11}	5
(Australia) Sandon Stolle (France) Noëlle van Lottum	7^{13}	7

=== Second qualifier ===
First round
2	(Soviet Union) Andrei Olhovskiy (Soviet Union) Eugenia Maniokova	4	2
(South Africa) Lan Bale (Netherlands) Amy van Buuren	6	6
(United States) Doug Flach (Germany) Anke Huber	7	6
WC	(United Kingdom) Paul Hand (United Kingdom) Kaye Hand	5	4
(Sweden) Niclas Kroon (Australia) Louise Pleming	4	4
(Australia) Andrew Kratzmann (Australia) Kerry-Anne Guse	6	6
(Australia) Carl Limberger (Australia) Clare Thompson	6^{5}	2
5	(New Zealand) Bruce Derlin (Australia) Kristine Radford	7^{7}	6

Second round
(South Africa) Lan Bale (Netherlands) Amy van Buuren	6	6
(United States) Doug Flach (Germany) Anke Huber	3	4
(Australia) Andrew Kratzmann (Australia) Kerry-Anne Guse	3	7	6
5	(New Zealand) Bruce Derlin (Australia) Kristine Radford	6	6^{5}	4

Qualifying competition
(South Africa) Lan Bale (Netherlands) Amy van Buuren	3	6	6
(Australia) Andrew Kratzmann (Australia) Kerry-Anne Guse	6	4	8

=== Third qualifier ===
First round
3	(United States) Mark Keil (Mexico) Lupita Novelo	6	6
(New Zealand) Brett Steven (New Zealand) Claudine Toleafoa	4	4
(South Africa) Richard Lubner (South Africa) Amanda Coetzer	3	6^{4}
(Australia) Jamie Morgan (Australia) Danielle Jones	6	7^{7}
(South Africa) Brent Haygarth (United States) Donna Faber	4	6^{9}
(United States) Eric Amend (United States) Heather Ludloff	6	7^{11}
(Australia) Wayne Arthurs (Australia) Justine Hodder	4	6	2
4	(Brazil) Nelson Aerts (Uruguay) Patricia Miller	6	4	6

Second round
3	(United States) Mark Keil (Mexico) Lupita Novelo	6	2	9
(Australia) Jamie Morgan (Australia) Danielle Jones	4	6	7
(United States) Eric Amend (United States) Heather Ludloff	6^{4}	6	6
4	(Brazil) Nelson Aerts (Uruguay) Patricia Miller	7^{7}	4	4

Qualifying competition
3	(United States) Mark Keil (Mexico) Lupita Novelo	6	3	10
(United States) Eric Amend (United States) Heather Ludloff	2	6	12
