= 1988 Volvo International – Singles =

Singles
- 1988 Volvo International

Final
- Champion: (United States) Andre Agassi
- Runner-up: (United States) Paul Annacone
- Score: 6–2, 6–4

Details
- Draw: 64
- Seeds: 16

Events
Singles	Doubles
← 1987 ·	Volvo International	· 1989 →

Andre Agassi won in the final 6–2, 6–4 against Paul Annacone.

== Seeds ==
A champion seed is indicated in bold text while text in italics indicates the round in which that seed was eliminated.

1. (Czechoslovakia) Ivan Lendl (second round)
2. (United States) **Andre Agassi (champion)**
3. (United States) Brad Gilbert (first round)
4. (Israel) Amos Mansdorf (second round)
5. (United States) Aaron Krickstein (third round)
6. (United States) David Pate (second round)
7. (Sweden) Peter Lundgren (third round)
8. (United States) Eliot Teltscher (first round)
9. (Australia) Darren Cahill (semifinals)
10. (United States) Jay Berger (quarterfinals)
11. (South Africa) Christo van Rensburg (first round)
12. (United States) Dan Goldie (semifinals)
13. (United States) Paul Annacone (final)
14. (Australia) John Frawley (second round)
15. (United States) Jim Grabb (first round)
16. (United States) Jim Pugh (third round)

== Draw ==
=== Key ===
- Q = Qualifier
- WC = Wild card
- LL = Lucky loser
- Alt = Alternate
- SE = Special exempt
- PR = Protected ranking
- ITF = ITF entry
- JE = Junior exempt
- w/o = Walkover
- r = Retired
- d = Defaulted
- SR = Special ranking

=== Finals ===
Semifinals
9	(Australia) Darren Cahill	4	3
WC/13	(United States) **Paul Annacone**	**6**	**6**
12	(United States) Dan Goldie	3	3
2	(United States) **Andre Agassi**	**6**	**6**

Final
WC/13	(United States) Paul Annacone	2	4
2	(United States) **Andre Agassi**	**6**	**6**

=== Top half ===
==== Section 1 ====
First round
1	(Czechoslovakia) **I Lendl**	**6**	**6**
(West Germany) C Saceanu	4	4
(The Bahamas) **R Smith**	3	**7**	**6**
WC	(United States) D Goldberg	**6**	6	3
(United States) J Brown	2	**6**	6
Q	(United States) **E Amend**	**6**	3	**7**
(South Africa) **P Aldrich**	**6**	**7**
15	(United States) J Grabb	3	6
9	(Australia) **D Cahill**	**6**	**6**
(New Zealand) K Evernden	3	0
(United States) **D Cassidy**	**6**	**6**
(Canada) C Pridham	4	4
(Canada) **M Laurendeau**	6	**6**	**6**
WC	(United States) D Wheaton	**7**	4	4
(South Africa) **M Robertson**	**6**	**6**
8	(United States) E Teltscher	3	4

Second round
1	(Czechoslovakia) I Lendl	2	3
(The Bahamas) **R Smith**	**6**	**6**
Q	(United States) **E Amend**	**6**	4	**7**
(South Africa) P Aldrich	3	**6**	6
9	(Australia) **D Cahill**	**6**	**6**
(United States) D Cassidy	1	2
(Canada) M Laurendeau	2	6
(South Africa) **M Robertson**	**6**	**7**

Third round
(The Bahamas) **R Smith**	**6**	**6**
Q	(United States) E Amend	1	4
9	(Australia) **D Cahill**	**6**	6	**6**
(South Africa) M Robertson	2	**7**	2

Quarterfinals
(The Bahamas) R Smith	3	**6**	2
9	(Australia) **D Cahill**	**6**	4	**6**

==== Section 2 ====
First round
3	(United States) B Gilbert	6	6
Q	(Mexico) **L Lavalle**	**7**	**7**
(United States) D Rostagno	4	4
(Canada) **G Connell**	**6**	**6**
(United States) **M Chang**	4	**6**	**6**
(United States) M Dickson	**6**	1	2
Q	(United States) P Chamberlin	5	5
WC/13	(United States) **P Annacone**	**7**	**7**
11	(South Africa) C van Rensburg	2	5
Q	(United States) **M Washington**	**6**	**7**
SE	(Sweden) T Högstedt	3	2
(United States) **M Davis**	**6**	**6**
(South Africa) D Visser	6	4
(United States) **J Rive**	**7**	**6**
(United States) M Flur	**6**	4	1
5	(United States) **A Krickstein**	3	**6**	**6**

Second round
Q	(Mexico) **L Lavalle**	**6**	**6**
(Canada) G Connell	4	2
(United States) M Chang	4	5
WC/13	(United States) **P Annacone**	**6**	**7**
Q	(United States) M Washington	6	4
(United States) **M Davis**	**7**	**6**
(United States) J Rive	4	2
5	(United States) **A Krickstein**	**6**	**6**

Third round
Q	(Mexico) L Lavalle	3	3
WC/13	(United States) **P Annacone**	**6**	**6**
(United States) **M Davis**	**6**	**6**
5	(United States) A Krickstein	3	4

Quarterfinals
WC/13	(United States) **P Annacone**	**6**	4	**7**
(United States) M Davis	4	**6**	5

=== Bottom half ===
==== Section 3 ====
First round
6	(United States) **D Pate**	**6**	**7**
Q	(Canada) G Roper	1	6
Q	(West Germany) C Geyer	5	**7**	3
(United States) **T Nelson**	**7**	5	**6**
(United States) **P Johnson**	2	**6**	**6**
(United States) S Giammalva, Jr.	**6**	4	2
(South Africa) G Muller	6	3
12	(United States) **D Goldie**	**7**	**6**
14	(Australia) **J Frawley**	**6**	**6**
(United States) R Leach	4	2
(United States) J Kriek	6	**6**	6
(United States) **J Courier**	**7**	2	**7**
(Senegal) **Y Doumbia**	**6**	**6**
(Australia) B Drewett	2	3
Q	(Australia) L Warder	**6**	6	2
4	(Israel) **A Mansdorf**	4	**7**	**6**

Second round
6	(United States) D Pate	3	3
(United States) **T Nelson**	**6**	**6**
(United States) P Johnson	4	2
12	(United States) **D Goldie**	**6**	**6**
14	(Australia) J Frawley	3	6
(United States) **J Courier**	**6**	**7**
(Senegal) **Y Doumbia**	4	**6**	**6**
4	(Israel) A Mansdorf	**6**	4	4

Third round
(United States) T Nelson	4	**6**	3
12	(United States) **D Goldie**	**6**	3	**6**
(United States) **J Courier**	**7**	**6**
(Senegal) Y Doumbia	6	0

Quarterfinals
12	(United States) **D Goldie**	**6**	4	**6**
(United States) J Courier	4	**6**	4

==== Section 4 ====
First round
WC/7	(Sweden) **P Lundgren**	**6**	**6**
(Italy) G Pozzi	4	3
(United Kingdom) **A Castle**	**7**	**6**
WC	(United States) L Scott	6	1
(Australia) S Youl	5	3
(Canada) **G Michibata**	**7**	**6**
(New Zealand) D Lewis	2	2
10	(United States) **J Berger**	**6**	**6**
16	(United States) **J Pugh**	**7**	**6**
(United States) J Ross	5	2
(United States) **S Davis**	4	**6**	**6**
(Peru) J Yzaga	**6**	3	4
(United States) **G Holmes**	**6**	**6**
Q	(United States) J Gurfein	3	4
(Kenya) P Wekesa	4	**6**	2
2	(United States) **A Agassi**	**6**	3	**6**

Second round
WC/7	(Sweden) **P Lundgren**	**6**	**6**
(United Kingdom) A Castle	2	3
(Canada) G Michibata	4	4
10	(United States) **J Berger**	**6**	**6**
16	(United States) **J Pugh**	**6**	**7**
(United States) S Davis	3	5
(United States) G Holmes	4	2
2	(United States) **A Agassi**	**6**	**6**

Third round
WC/7	(Sweden) P Lundgren	2	3
10	(United States) **J Berger**	**6**	**6**
16	(United States) J Pugh	**6**	3	4
2	(United States) **A Agassi**	3	**6**	**6**

Quarterfinals
10	(United States) J Berger	1	**6**	3
2	(United States) **A Agassi**	**6**	1	**6**
