= Carlos Claverie =

Carlos Claverie may refer to:

- Carlos Claverie (swimmer) (born 1996), Venezuelan swimmer
- Carlos Claverie (tennis) (born 1963), Venezuelan tennis player, father of above
