= Greg Failla =

American tennis player (born 1968)

- Country (sports): United States
- Born: March 9, 1968 (age 57); Seattle, Washington, U.S.
- Height: 5 ft 11 in (180 cm)
- Prize money: $34,837

Singles
- Career record: 1–4
- Highest ranking: No. 249 (May 20, 1991)

Grand Slam singles results
- Australian Open: Q2 (1991, 1992)
- French Open: Q? (1991)
- Wimbledon: Q2 (1991)
- US Open: Q? (1991)

Doubles
- Career record: 0–2
- Highest ranking: No. 339 (Dec 10, 1990)

Grand Slam doubles results
- Wimbledon: Q1 (1991)

Greg Failla (born March 9, 1968) is an American former professional tennis player.

A native of Kirkland, Washington, Failla moved to San Diego when he was a teenager and as a student at Ramona High School was the 1985 CIF boys' singles champion. He was a two-time All-American for Cal State-Long Beach (1987 & 1988) and during this time broke into the top 10 of the national collegiate rankings. In 1989 he transferred to The University of Southern California for his senior year.

Failla had a best singles world ranking of 249 on the professional tour and appeared in the qualifying draw for all four grand slam tournaments. His best performance on the Grand Prix/ATP circuits came at Indianapolis in 1988, where he beat Marty Davis to make second round.

== Personal life ==
Failla married tennis player Katrina Crawford and they have four children. Their eldest daughter, Jessica, currently competes on the professional tour.

== ATP Challenger finals ==
=== Doubles: 1 (0–1) ===
Result	Date	Tournament	Surface	Partner	Opponents	Score
Loss	Sep 1990	Bogotá, Colombia	Clay	(Venezuela) Carlos Claverie	(Colombia) Mauricio Hadad (Colombia) Mario Rincón	6–7, 6–7
