= 1991 Wimbledon Championships – Women's singles qualifying =

Women's singles qualifying
- 1991 Wimbledon Championships

Events
Singles	men	women		boys	girls
Doubles	men	women	mixed	boys	girls
WC Singles	men	women	quad
WC Doubles	men	women	quad
Legends	men	women	seniors

Qualification
Singles	men	women
Doubles	men	women	mixed
- Wimbledon Championships

Players and pairs who neither have high enough rankings nor receive wild cards may participate in a qualifying tournament held one week before the annual Wimbledon Tennis Championships.

== Seeds ==
1. (Netherlands) Nicole Jagerman (qualified)
2. (France) Nathalie Guerrée (second round)
3. (United States) Renata Baranski (second round)
4. (Hungary) Anna Földényi (second round)
5. (Japan) Kimiko Date (qualifying competition, lucky loser)
6. (New Zealand) Belinda Cordwell (second round)
7. (Australia) Louise Field (first round)
8. (France) Catherine Suire (qualified)
9. n/a
10. (Netherlands) Petra Kamstra (qualified)
11. (Japan) Tamaka Takagi (first round)
12. n/a
13. (Netherlands) Miriam Oremans (qualified)
14. (United States) Chanda Rubin (first round)
15. (Australia) Jo-Anne Faull (qualifying competition, lucky loser)
16. (France) Isabelle Demongeot (qualified)

== Qualifiers ==
1. (Netherlands) Nicole Jagerman
2. (France) Isabelle Demongeot
3. (Netherlands) Miriam Oremans
4. (France) Catherine Suire
5. (Belgium) Els Callens
6. (Australia) Kristine Radford
7. (Netherlands) Petra Kamstra
8. (Australia) Rennae Stubbs

== Lucky losers ==
1. (Japan) Kimiko Date
2. (Canada) Jill Hetherington
3. (Australia) Nicole Pratt
4. (New Zealand) Claudine Toleafoa
5. (Australia) Jo-Anne Faull

== Qualifying draw ==
=== First qualifier ===
First round
1	(Netherlands) Nicole Jagerman	6	6
Alt	(Germany) Christiane Hofmann	1	0
(United States) Cammy MacGregor	6	6
(Austria) Heidi Sprung	1	3
WC	(United Kingdom) Caroline Billingham	3	5
(Indonesia) Suzanna Wibowo	6	7
(United States) Jennifer Santrock	7^{7}	0	0
Alt	(Australia) Louise Stacey	6^{3}	6	6

Second round
1	(Netherlands) Nicole Jagerman	7^{7}	4	7
(United States) Cammy MacGregor	6^{4}	6	5
(Indonesia) Suzanna Wibowo	3	0
Alt	(Australia) Louise Stacey	6	6

Qualifying competition
1	(Netherlands) Nicole Jagerman	6	6
Alt	(Australia) Louise Stacey	2	4

=== Second qualifier ===
First round
16	(France) Isabelle Demongeot	7	6
Alt	(Australia) Danielle Jones	5	1
(Japan) Kumiko Okamoto	6	4	6
(Australia) Joanne Limmer	3	6	4
(Australia) Michelle Jaggard	7^{7}	4	5
(United States) Katrina Adams	6^{2}	6	7
(Netherlands) Gaby Coorengel	0	6	2
5	(Japan) Kimiko Date	6	1	6

Second round
16	(France) Isabelle Demongeot	7^{7}	6
(Japan) Kumiko Okamoto	6^{1}	3
(United States) Katrina Adams	3	6^{3}
5	(Japan) Kimiko Date	6	7^{7}

Qualifying competition
16	(France) Isabelle Demongeot	6	3	6
(Japan) Kimiko Date	2	6	1

=== Third qualifier ===
First round
4	(Hungary) Anna Földényi	6	6
(Czechoslovakia) Hana Adámková	3	1
(Canada) Jill Hetherington	6	6
(South Africa) Robyn Field	2	1
(Japan) Yone Kamio	1	2
(United States) Camille Benjamin	6	6
(Israel) Ilana Berger	6^{1}	5
13	(Netherlands) Miriam Oremans	7^{7}	7

Second round
4	(Hungary) Anna Földényi	6^{5}	6	2
(Canada) Jill Hetherington	7^{7}	4	6
(United States) Camille Benjamin	5	3
13	(Netherlands) Miriam Oremans	7	6

Qualifying competition
(Canada) Jill Hetherington	4	5
13	(Netherlands) Miriam Oremans	6	7

=== Fourth qualifier ===
First round
11	(Japan) Tamaka Takagi	3	6^{9}
(France) Pascale Etchemendy	6	7^{11}
(Australia) Nicole Pratt	6	6
(Japan) Ei Iida	2	4
WC	(United Kingdom) Colette Hall	6	6
(United States) Alysia May	1	1
(Japan) Emiko Okagawa	5	0
8	(France) Catherine Suire	7	6

Second round
(France) Pascale Etchemendy	7	1	4
(Australia) Nicole Pratt	5	6	6
WC	(United Kingdom) Colette Hall	3	2
8	(France) Catherine Suire	6	6

Qualifying competition
(Australia) Nicole Pratt	7	5	1
8	(France) Catherine Suire	5	7	6

=== Fifth qualifier ===
First round
7	(Australia) Louise Field	3	4
WC	(United Kingdom) Valda Lake	6	6
(Japan) Akemi Nishiya	2	7^{7}	1
(United States) Stacey Schefflin	6	6^{2}	6
(Australia) Jane Taylor	6	6
WC	(United Kingdom) Jane Wood	3	4
(Netherlands) Caroline Vis	2	2
Alt	(Belgium) Els Callens	6	6

Second round
WC	(United Kingdom) Valda Lake	7	6
(United States) Stacey Schefflin	5	2
(Australia) Jane Taylor	6	1	1
Alt	(Belgium) Els Callens	1	6	6

Qualifying competition
WC	(United Kingdom) Valda Lake	6	6^{4}	3
Alt	(Belgium) Els Callens	3	7^{7}	6

=== Sixth qualifier ===
First round
14	(United States) Chanda Rubin	1	2
(New Zealand) Claudine Toleafoa	6	6
WC	(Soviet Union) Tatiana Ignatieva	6^{1}	2
WC	(United Kingdom) Shirli-Ann Siddall	7^{7}	6
(Norway) Amy Jönsson Raaholt	3	3
(Australia) Kristine Radford	6	6
(Germany) Sabine Gerke	3	3
3	(United States) Renata Baranski	6	6

Second round
(New Zealand) Claudine Toleafoa	6	3	7
WC	(United Kingdom) Shirli-Ann Siddall	1	6	5
(Australia) Kristine Radford	7^{7}	4	7
3	(United States) Renata Baranski	6^{5}	6	5

Qualifying competition
(New Zealand) Claudine Toleafoa	0	6^{6}
(Australia) Kristine Radford	6	7^{8}

=== Seventh qualifier ===
First round
6	(New Zealand) Belinda Cordwell	6	3	6
(Sweden) Maria Lindström	4	6	4
Alt	(Australia) Catherine Barclay	1	6	6
(United States) Jessica Emmons	6	4	1
WC	(United Kingdom) Natasha Giles	0	2
(Netherlands) Carin Bakkum	6	6
(United States) Elise Burgin	5	3
10	(Netherlands) Petra Kamstra	7	6

Second round
6	(New Zealand) Belinda Cordwell	1	6	9
Alt	(Australia) Catherine Barclay	6	3	11
(Netherlands) Carin Bakkum	6	1	4
10	(Netherlands) Petra Kamstra	4	6	6

Qualifying competition
Alt	(Australia) Catherine Barclay	4	1
10	(Netherlands) Petra Kamstra	6	6

=== Eighth qualifier ===
First round
15	(Australia) Jo-Anne Faull	6	6
WC	(United Kingdom) Caroline Hunt	4	2
(Australia) Tracey Morton	2	3
(United States) Sandy Collins	6	6
(Greece) Julia Apostoli	1	1
(Australia) Rennae Stubbs	6	6
(United States) Pam Nelson	2	7^{7}	3
2	(France) Nathalie Guerrée	6	6^{2}	6

Second round
15	(Australia) Jo-Anne Faull	6	4	6
(United States) Sandy Collins	3	6	4
(Australia) Rennae Stubbs	6	6
2	(France) Nathalie Guerrée	2	2

Qualifying competition
15	(Australia) Jo-Anne Faull	6	5	3
(Australia) Rennae Stubbs	3	7	6
