= Mario Rincón =

Colombian tennis player

Mario Rincon
- Country (sports): Colombia
- Born: 13 December 1967 (age 57)
- Plays: Right-handed
- Prize money: $132,921

Singles
- Career record: 3–15
- Career titles: 0
- Highest ranking: No. 193 (13 February 1995)

Grand Slam singles results
- US Open: 1R (1990)

Doubles
- Career record: 5–7
- Career titles: 0
- Highest ranking: No. 257 (19 February 1996)

Mario Rincón (born 13 December 1967) is a former professional tennis player from Colombia.

== Career ==
Rincon completed his education in the United States and was an NCAA All-American at the University of Kentucky.

After making his way through qualifying, Rincon played David Engel in the opening round of the 1990 US Open. He was beaten in straight sets.

His best performances on the ATP Tour all came at his home event, the Colombia Open. He made the second round in 1994 and 1997, managing a win over world number 47 Marcelo Filippini in the later. In the doubles he was a semi-finalist in 1995, with Fernando Meligeni as his partner.

Rincon appeared in nine Davis Cup ties for Colombia during his career, playing 18 matches, of which he won five.

He is a former head coach of the Miami Hurricanes.

== Challenger titles ==
=== Doubles: (1) ===
No.	Year	Tournament	Surface	Partner	Opponents in the final	Score in the final
1.	1990	Bogotá, Colombia	Clay	(Colombia) Mauricio Hadad	(Venezuela) Carlos Claverie (United States) Greg Failla	7–6, 7–6
