= 1988 Volvo International – Doubles =

Doubles
- 1988 Volvo International

Final
- Champions: (Mexico) Jorge Lozano (United States) Todd Witsken
- Runners-up: (South Africa) Pieter Aldrich (South Africa) Danie Visser
- Score: 6–3, 7–6

Details
- Draw: 32
- Seeds: 8

Events
Singles	Doubles
← 1987 ·	Volvo International	· 1989 →

Jorge Lozano and Todd Witsken won in the final 6–3, 7–6 against Pieter Aldrich and Danie Visser.

== Seeds ==
Champion seeds are indicated in bold text while text in italics indicates the round in which those seeds were eliminated.

1. (United States) Ken Flach / (United States) Robert Seguso (semifinals)
2. (Mexico) **Jorge Lozano** / (United States) **Todd Witsken (champions)**
3. (New Zealand) Kelly Evernden / (United States) Johan Kriek (first round)
4. (United States) Rick Leach / (United States) Jim Pugh (quarterfinals)
5. (South Africa) Pieter Aldrich / (South Africa) Danie Visser (final)
6. (United States) Paul Annacone / (South Africa) Christo van Rensburg (first round)
7. (United States) Steve Denton / (United States) David Pate (second round)
8. (Australia) Darren Cahill / (Australia) Brad Drewett (quarterfinals)

== Draw ==
=== Key ===
- Q = Qualifier
- WC = Wild card
- LL = Lucky loser
- Alt = Alternate
- SE = Special exempt
- PR = Protected ranking
- ITF = ITF entry
- JE = Junior exempt
- w/o = Walkover
- r = Retired
- d = Defaulted
- SR = Special ranking

=== Final ===
Final
5	(South Africa) Pieter Aldrich (South Africa) Danie Visser	3	6
2	(Mexico) **Jorge Lozano** (United States) **Todd Witsken**	**6**	**7**

=== Top half ===
First round
1	(United States) **K Flach** (United States) **R Seguso**	**7**	**7**
(Israel) A Mansdorf (United States) J Ross	6	6
(United States) **G Holmes** (United States) **T Siegel**	**6**	**6**
(Australia) D Macpherson (Australia) S Youl	3	4
(United States) **J Grabb** (United States) **P McEnroe**	**6**	**6**
(United Kingdom) A Castle (Canada) M Laurendeau	4	4
(United States) P Chamberlin (United States) L Scott	5	6
8	(Australia) **D Cahill** (Australia) **B Drewett**	**7**	**7**
4	(United States) **R Leach** (United States) **J Pugh**	**7**	**6**
(United States) M Flur (United States) S Giammalva Jr.	5	3
(United States) M Dickson (West Germany) C Saceanu	**7**	3	6
(United States) **M Basham** (United States) **C Beckman**	6	**6**	**7**
(United States) D Cassidy (Australia) J Frawley	**7**	6	5
(United States) **S Davis** (United States) **D Goldie**	6	**7**	**7**
WC	(United States) G Van Emburgh (United States) M Washington	4	3
5	(South Africa) **P Aldrich** (South Africa) **D Visser**	**6**	**6**

Second round
1	(United States) **K Flach** (United States) **R Seguso**	**6**	**7**
(United States) G Holmes (United States) T Siegel	4	6
(United States) J Grabb (United States) P McEnroe	**7**	6	5
8	(Australia) **D Cahill** (Australia) **B Drewett**	5	**7**	**7**
4	(United States) **R Leach** (United States) **J Pugh**	**6**	**7**
(United States) M Basham (United States) C Beckman	2	6
(United States) S Davis (United States) D Goldie	4	4
5	(South Africa) **P Aldrich** (South Africa) **D Visser**	**6**	**6**

Quarterfinals
1	(United States) **K Flach** (United States) **R Seguso**	**7**	**6**
8	(Australia) D Cahill (Australia) B Drewett	6	2
4	(United States) R Leach (United States) J Pugh	**6**	5	6
5	(South Africa) **P Aldrich** (South Africa) **D Visser**	4	**7**	**7**

Semifinals
1	(United States) K Flach (United States) R Seguso	3	6
5	(South Africa) **P Aldrich** (South Africa) **D Visser**	**6**	**7**

=== Bottom half ===
First round
6	(United States) P Annacone (South Africa) C van Rensburg	5	6
(Canada) **G Connell** (Canada) **G Michibata**	**7**	**7**
(South Africa) **G Muller** (Australia) **L Warder**	**6**	3	**6**
(The Bahamas) R Smith (Kenya) P Wekesa	3	**6**	3
(United States) **M Davis** (United States) **B Gilbert**	**6**	6	**7**
(Italy) G Pozzi (South Africa) M Robertson	4	**7**	6
(United States) **D Dowlen** (United States) **E Teltscher**	**7**	**6**
3	(New Zealand) K Evernden (United States) J Kriek	6	1
7	(United States) **S Denton** (United States) **D Pate**	**6**	**7**
WC	(United States) J Berger (United States) M Chang	1	5
(United States) **T Nelson** (United States) **J Rive**	5	**6**	**6**
(Australia) M Fancutt (New Zealand) D Lewis	**7**	4	4
WC	(United States) **J Courier** (United States) **D Wheaton**	**6**	**6**
(United States) H Endelman (United States) J Sobel	4	4
(Mexico) L Lavalle (Peru) J Yzaga	6	5
2	(Mexico) **J Lozano** (United States) **T Witsken**	**7**	**7**

Second round
(Canada) G Connell (Canada) G Michibata	3	4
(South Africa) **G Muller** (Australia) **L Warder**	**6**	**6**
(United States) **M Davis** (United States) **B Gilbert**	**7**	5	**6**
(United States) D Dowlen (United States) E Teltscher	5	**7**	1
7	(United States) S Denton (United States) D Pate	6	6
(United States) **T Nelson** (United States) **J Rive**	**7**	**7**
WC	(United States) J Courier (United States) D Wheaton	**6**	6	6
2	(Mexico) **J Lozano** (United States) **T Witsken**	3	**7**	**7**

Quarterfinals
(South Africa) **G Muller** (Australia) **L Warder**	**6**	**7**
(United States) M Davis (United States) B Gilbert	3	6
(United States) T Nelson (United States) J Rive	2	2
2	(Mexico) **J Lozano** (United States) **T Witsken**	**6**	**6**

Semifinals
(South Africa) G Muller (Australia) L Warder	**7**	6	5
2	(Mexico) **J Lozano** (United States) **T Witsken**	6	**7**	**7**
