= 1988 Volvo International =

- Date: July 25 – August 1
- Edition: 16th
- Draw: 64S / 32D
- Prize money: $400,000
- Surface: Hard / outdoor
- Location: Stratton Mountain, Vermont, U.S.
- Venue: Stratton Mountain Resort

Champions

Singles
- (United States) Andre Agassi

Doubles
- (Mexico) Jorge Lozano / (United States) Todd Witsken
- Volvo International

The 1988 Volvo International was a men's tennis tournament played on outdoor hard courts at the Stratton Mountain Resort in Stratton Mountain, Vermont, United States, and was part of the 1988 Nabisco Grand Prix. The tournament ran from July 25 through August 1, 1988. Second-seeded Andre Agassi won the singles title.

== Finals ==
=== Singles ===
(United States) Andre Agassi defeated (United States) Paul Annacone 6–2, 6–4

- It was Agassi's 5th singles title of the year and the 6th of his career.

=== Doubles ===
(Mexico) Jorge Lozano / (United States) Todd Witsken defeated (South Africa) Pieter Aldrich / (South Africa) Danie Visser 6–3, 7–6

- It was Lozano's 4th title of the year and the 4th of his career. It was Witsken's 4th title of the year and the 4th of his career.
