= Mike Briggs (tennis) =

American tennis player

- Country (sports): United States
- Born: September 6, 1968 (age 57) Newport Beach, California
- Height: 5 ft 10 in (178 cm)
- Turned pro: 1989
- Plays: Right-handed
- Prize money: $156,019

Singles
- Career record: 0-1
- Career titles: 0
- Highest ranking: No. 272 (March 4, 1991)

Doubles
- Career record: 43-53
- Career titles: 1
- Highest ranking: No. 37 (March 22, 1993)

Grand Slam doubles results
- Australian Open: 3R (1993)
- French Open: 3R (1992)
- Wimbledon: 1R (1992, 1993)
- US Open: 2R (1993)

Mixed doubles

Grand Slam mixed doubles results
- French Open: 3R (1993)
- Wimbledon: 2R (1992)
- US Open: 1R (1992)

Mike Briggs (born September 6, 1968) is a former professional tennis player from the United States.

== Career ==
Briggs, a two-time All-American, played tennis for the UC Irvine Anteaters in the late 1980s and with partner Trevor Kronemann made the NCAA doubles final in 1989, which they lost to Eric Amend and Byron Black. With Kronemann, Briggs also won his only ATP doubles title, at Tampa (as qualifiers), and reached the 1992 French Open and 1993 Australian Open third rounds. He won four ATP Challenger doubles tournaments.

== ATP Tour finals ==
=== Doubles: 1 (1–0) ===
Outcome	No.	Year	Tournament	Surface	Partner	Opponents in the final	Score in the final
Winner	1.	1992	Tampa, United States	Clay	(United States) Trevor Kronemann	(Brazil) Luiz Mattar (Russia) Andrei Olhovskiy	7–6, 6–7, 6–4

== Challenger titles ==
=== Doubles: (4) ===
No.	Year	Tournament	Surface	Partner	Opponents in the final	Score in the final
1.	1990	Jakarta, Indonesia	Hard	(United States) David Harkness	(Chinese Taipei) Lin Bing-chao (Indonesia) Suharyadi Suharyadi	6–2, 7–6
2.	1991	Jakarta, Indonesia	Hard	(United States) Trevor Kronemann	(United States) John Sullivan (Netherlands) Vincent Van Gelderen	5–7, 6–3, 7–5
3.	1991	Singapore	Hard	(United States) Trevor Kronemann	(South Africa) David Adams (United States) Scott Patridge	6–3, 6–4
4.	1992	Agadir, Morocco	Clay	(United States) Trevor Kronemann	(Sweden) Per Henricsson (Sweden) Ola Jonsson	6–1, 6–1
