= Florian Krumrey =

German tennis player

- Country (sports): West Germany; Germany
- Born: 27 January 1970 (age 55); Munich, West Germany
- Height: 1.91 m (6 ft 3 in)
- Plays: Right-handed
- Prize money: $50,668

Singles
- Career record: 1–2
- Highest ranking: No. 219 (17 August 1992)

Grand Slam singles results
- Australian Open: Q2 (1993)
- French Open: Q2 (1993)
- Wimbledon: Q1 (1991, 1993)
- US Open: Q1 (1992)

Doubles
- Career record: 0–1
- Highest ranking: No. 344 (6 July 1992)

Florian Krumrey (born 27 January 1970) is a German former professional tennis player.

== Biography ==
Born in Munich, Krumrey grew up in the nearby Bavarian town of Prien am Chiemsee and started competing professionally in 1987.

Krumey made his ATP Tour main draw debut at the 1991 Kremlin Cup and had his best performance at the 1992 Prague Open, reaching the second round.

During his career he featured in the qualifying draws for all four grand slam tournaments.

Krumey now works in sports marketing.
