= David Harkness =

American tennis player

- Country (sports): United States
- Born: May 29, 1965 (age 61)
- Height: 6 ft 3 in (191 cm)
- Plays: Left-handed
- Prize money: $10,158

Singles
- Highest ranking: No. 256 (8 Oct, 1990)

Grand Slam singles results
- Wimbledon: Q1 (1990)

Doubles
- Highest ranking: No. 258 (13 Aug, 1990)

Grand Slam doubles results
- Wimbledon: Q1 (1990)

David S. Harkness (born May 29, 1965) is an American former professional tennis player.

A left-hander, Harkness played four years of collegiate tennis while attending Brigham Young University (BYU). He was named WAC Freshman of the Year in 1985 and was a two-time All-American during his time at BYU.

Harkness, who turned professional in 1989, had a best singles world ranking of 256 and featured in the qualifying draw for the 1990 Wimbledon Championships. He won an ATP Challenger doubles title in Jakarta in 1990 (with Mike Briggs).

In 2017 he was inducted into the Utah Tennis Hall of Fame.

== ATP Challenger titles ==
=== Doubles: (1) ===
No.	Date	Tournament	Surface	Partner	Opponents	Score
1.	Aug 1990	Jakarta Challenger; Jakarta, Indonesia	Hard	(United States) Mike Briggs	(Chinese Taipei) Lin Bing-chao (Indonesia) Hary Suharyadi	6–2, 7–6
