= Boris Laustroer =

German tennis player

- Country (sports): West Germany; Germany
- Born: 24 May 1970 Oelde, West Germany
- Died: 8 April 2023 (aged 52)
- Height: 5 ft 9 in (175 cm)
- Plays: Right-handed
- Prize money: $10,675

Singles
- Highest ranking: No. 203 (22 Apr 1991)

Doubles
- Highest ranking: No. 1031 (26 Oct 1992)

Boris Laustroer (24 May 1970 – 8 April 2023) was a German professional tennis player.

Laustroer, a native of Oelde, competed on the professional tour in the early 1990s. He had a best singles ranking of 203 in the world and won an ATP Challenger tournament in Singapore in 1990, beating Sander Groen in the final. He took his life due to depression on 8 April 2023.

== ATP Challenger titles ==
=== Singles: (1) ===
No.	Date	Tournament	Surface	Opponents	Score
1.	Oct 1990	Singapore Challenger, Singapore	Hard	(Netherlands) Sander Groen	7–6, 6–4
