= Christian Geyer =

German tennis player (born 1964)

- Full name: Christian Geyer
- Country (sports): West Germany; Germany
- Born: 12 April 1964 (age 61) Hamburg, West Germany
- Plays: Left-handed
- Prize money: $74,159

Singles
- Career record: 2–6
- Career titles: 0
- Highest ranking: No. 154 (15 October 1990)

Doubles
- Career record: 1–2
- Career titles: 0
- Highest ranking: No. 253 (15 November 1993)

Christian Geyer (born 12 April 1964) is a former professional tennis player from Germany.

== Biography ==
Geyer was a left-handed player from Hamburg. He had early success as a doubles player at a WCT tournament in Dortmund in 1982 where he and Udo Riglewski had a win over Wimbledon winner Paul McNamee and his partner to make the quarter-finals. From 1984 he competed professionally and appeared in the singles main draws of six Grand Prix (later ATP Tour) tournaments, reaching the second round at both Hilversum and Vienna in 1989. At Challenger level he had his best year in 1990 when he won the title in Thessaloniki and also won a match over the world's 24th ranked player Christo van Rensburg at an event in Cape Town. In October 1990 he reached his highest ranking of 154.

== Challenger titles ==
=== Singles: (1) ===
No.	Year	Tournament	Surface	Opponent	Score
1.	1990	Thessaloniki, Greece	Hard	(Sweden) Henrik Holm	7–6, 6–3
