= Sean Seymour-Cole =

British tennis player (born 1966)

Sean Cole
- Full name: Sean Seymour-Cole
- Country (sports): Great Britain
- Born: 2 June 1966 (age 58); Surrey, England
- Prize money: $22,636

Singles
- Career record: 0–1
- Highest ranking: No. 325 (21 December 1992)

Grand Slam singles results
- Wimbledon: 1R (1993)

Doubles
- Career record: 0–1
- Highest ranking: No. 204 (26 April 1993)

Grand Slam doubles results
- Wimbledon: 1R (1993)

Sean Seymour-Cole (born 2 June 1966), also known as Sean Cole, is a British former professional tennis player.

== Biography ==
Cole competed in the men's single and doubles main draws at the 1993 Wimbledon Championships, as a wildcard in both. He lost in four sets to Arnaud Boetsch in the first round of the singles and partnered Miles Maclagan in the doubles, also for a first round exit.

At Challenger level he won one title, the doubles at Kakegawa, Japan in 1991, partnering Irishman Eoin Collins. He was also runner-up in five Challenger doubles finals.

He now works as a physiotherapist in London.

== Challenger titles ==
=== Doubles: (1) ===
No.	Year	Tournament	Surface	Partner	Opponents	Score
1.	1991	Kakegawa, Japan	Grass	(Republic of Ireland) Eoin Collins	(Germany) Florian Krumrey (United States) Ron Ward	7–6, 7–6
