= Richard Lubner =

South African tennis player

- Country (sports): South Africa
- Born: 1967 (age 57–58); Johannesburg, South Africa
- Prize money: $12,798

Singles
- Career record: 0–0
- Highest ranking: No. 384 (13 May 1991)

Grand Slam singles results
- Wimbledon: Q2 (1991)

Doubles
- Career titles: 1–1
- Highest ranking: No. 285 (23 September 1991)

Grand Slam doubles results
- Wimbledon: Q1 (1991)

Grand Slam mixed doubles results
- Wimbledon: Q1 (1991)

Richard Lubner (born 1967) is a South African former professional tennis player.

Born in Johannesburg, Lubner played collegiate tennis for UC Irvine from 1987 to 1990. He was a doubles All-American in 1989, reaching the semi-finals that year of the NCAA doubles championships, partnering Mark Kaplan. Lubner, who is Jewish, competed at the 1989 Maccabiah Games.

Lubner had career-high singles rankings of 384 in singles and 285 in doubles, while competing on the professional tour. With UC Irvine teammate Mark Kaplan he made his only Grand Prix main draw appearance in the doubles at the 1988 U.S. Pro Tennis Championships, and the pair also teamed up to win an ATP Challenger tournament in São Paulo in 1990. He featured in qualifying draws at the 1991 Wimbledon Championships.

Since 1994 he has lived in Australia.

== Challenger titles ==
=== Doubles: (1) ===
No.	Date	Tournament	Surface	Partner	Opponent	Score
1.	1990	São Paulo, Brazil	Clay	(United States) Francisco Montana	(Brazil) Nelson Aerts (Brazil) Danilo Marcelino	6–4, 7–6
