= John Stimpson =

American tennis player

- Full name: John Stimpson
- Country (sports): United States
- Born: September 4, 1968 (age 57) Mobile, Alabama, U.S.
- Height: 6 ft 0 in (183 cm)
- Plays: Left-handed
- Prize money: $46,176

Singles
- Career record: 1–3
- Highest ranking: No. 178 (July 29, 1991)

Doubles
- Career record: 1–1
- Highest ranking: No. 270 (July 6, 1992)

John Stimpson (born September 1968) is a former professional tennis player from the United States.

== Career ==
A left-handed player from Mobile, Alabama, Stimpson joined the tennis team at the University of Alabama in 1987 and played collegiate tennis until 1990, earning All-American honors in his final year.

Stimpson competed on the professional tennis circuit in the early 1990s, reaching a top ranking of 178 in the world. His biggest title win came at the 1991 Nagoya Challenger, where he beat Jan Apell in the final. All of his ATP Tour main draw appearances came in 1991, at the Hong Kong Open, Japan Open and Brasília Open.

== Challenger titles ==
=== Singles: (1) ===
| No. | Year | Tournament | Surface | Opponent | Score |
|---|---|---|---|---|---|
| 1. | 1991 | Nagoya, Japan | Hard | (Sweden) Jan Apell | 6–1, 6–3 |
