= Carlos Claverie (tennis) =

Venezuelan tennis player (born 1963)

- Country (sports): Venezuela
- Born: 13 January 1963 (age 62); Vienna, Austria
- Height: 1.85 m (6 ft 1 in)
- Prize money: $21,559

Singles
- Career record: 1–1 (ATP Tour)
- Highest ranking: No. 290 (12 August 1991)

Grand Slam singles results
- Wimbledon: Q1 (1991)

Doubles
- Highest ranking: No. 233 (20 May 1991)

Grand Slam doubles results
- Wimbledon: Q1 (1991)
Medal record
Central American and Caribbean Games
Bronze medal – third place	1982 Havana	Men's doubles
Pan American Games
Bronze medal – third place	1983 Caracas	Men's doubles

Carlos Claverie (born 13 January 1963) is a Venezuelan former professional tennis player.

== Tennis career ==
Claverie was a regular member of Venezuela's Davis Cup team in the 1980s and his career included a 1987 win over Canadian player Glenn Michibata, who the previous year had been ranked in the world's top-50. In a 1988 tie against Jamaica he came from two sets down to win the deciding fifth rubber over Noel Rutherford, with the match going six hours. He won a total of nine Davis Cup rubbers, all in singles.

A Pan American Games bronze medalist in 1983, Claverie qualified for his only ATP Tour main draw at the 1990 Volvo International in New Haven, where he had a first round win over wildcard Chuck Adams. In 1991 he featured in the qualifying draws at Wimbledon. He had a career high singles ranking of 290 in the world, attained in May 1991.

Claverie played United States collegiate tennis during the 1980s, first in Tennessee, then for the University of Maryland, where his girlfriend and future wife Claudia Borgiani was a member of the women's team. Their son, also named Carlos, is an Olympic swimmer who competed at the 2016 Summer Olympics.

In 2018, Claverie replaced Yohny Romero as the Davis Cup captain of Venezuela but was only in the role for a year.

== See also ==
- List of Pan American Games medalists in tennis
