= Eric Amend =

American tennis player

- Country (sports): United States
- Residence: Los Angeles, California, U.S.
- Born: November 17, 1965 (age 60) Berkeley, California, U.S.
- Height: 5 ft 11 in (180 cm)
- Retired: 1994
- Plays: Right-handed
- Prize money: $32,106

Singles
- Career record: 2–1
- Career titles: 0
- Highest ranking: No. 234 (September 20, 1993)

Other tournaments
- Olympic Games: R2 (1984, demonstration)

Doubles
- Career record: 3–7
- Career titles: 0
- Highest ranking: No. 168 (July 30, 1990)

Eric Amend (born November 17, 1965) is an American former tennis player who represented the United States at the 1984 Summer Olympics. Born in Berkeley, California, the right-hander did not win any ATP titles during his professional career reached his highest singles ATP-ranking on September 20, 1993, when he became the World No. 234. Amend served as an assistant coach for his alma mater's Tennis Team, at the University of Southern California, for five years during which the team won the 2009 & 2010 NCAA National Championships. He was a 4 time All-American at USC and teamed with Byron Black to win the 1989 NCAA Doubles Championship.
