= 1992 OTB Schenectady Open – Men's doubles =

Men's doubles
- 1992 OTB Schenectady Open

Final
- Champions: (Netherlands) Jacco Eltingh (Netherlands) Paul Haarhuis
- Runners-up: (Spain) Sergio Casal (Spain) Emilio Sánchez
- Score: 6–3, 6–4

Events
Singles	men	women
Doubles	men	women
← 1991 ·	OTB Open	· 1993 →

Javier Sánchez and Todd Woodbridge were the defending champions, but Woodbridge did not participate this year. Sánchez partnered Diego Nargiso, losing in the quarterfinals.

Jacco Eltingh and Paul Haarhuis won the title, defeating Sergio Casal and Emilio Sánchez 6–3, 6–4 in the final.

== Seeds ==
1. (Spain) Sergio Casal / (Spain) Emilio Sánchez (final)
2. (South Africa) David Adams / (Commonwealth of Independent States) Andrei Olhovskiy (first round)
3. (Netherlands) Jacco Eltingh / (Netherlands) Paul Haarhuis (champions)
4. (Italy) Diego Nargiso / (Spain) Javier Sánchez (quarterfinals)

== Draw ==
=== Key ===
- Q = Qualifier
- WC = Wild card
- LL = Lucky loser
- Alt = Alternate
- ITF = ITF entry
- PR = Protected ranking
- SR = Special ranking
- SE = Special exempt
- JE = Junior exempt
- JR = Junior Accelerator Programme entrant
- CO = College Accelerator Programme entrant
- NG = Next Gen Accelerator Program entrant
- w/o = Walkover
- r = Retired
- d = Defaulted

=== Draw ===
First round
1	(Spain) S Casal (Spain) E Sánchez	7	6
(Australia) R Fromberg (Australia) S Youl	6	3
(United States) D Eisenman (United States) T Scherman	4
(Spain) T Carbonell (Spain) F Roig	1^{r}
4	(Italy) D Nargiso (Spain) J Sánchez	6	6
(Australia) A Kratzmann (Australia) J Morgan	4	4
(United States) B Joelson (United States) R Matuszewski	6	6
(United States) M Lucena (Norway) B-O Pedersen	2	3
(Brazil) L Mattar (Brazil) C Motta	7	7
Q	(United States) T Mercer (South Africa) D Nainkin	6	5
(Mexico) L Herrera (Sweden) T Svantesson	6	6	4
3	(Netherlands) J Eltingh (Netherlands) P Haarhuis	4	7	6
WC	(United States) B Dunn (Commonwealth of Independent States) Y Kafelnikov	4	4
WC	(Mexico) L Lavalle (Peru) J Yzaga	6	6
(Spain) F Clavet (Spain) C Costa	7	6
2	(South Africa) D Adams (Commonwealth of Independent States) A Olhovskiy	5	1

Quarterfinals
1	(Spain) S Casal (Spain) E Sánchez	6	3	7
(United States) D Eisenman (United States) T Scherman	3	6	5
4	(Italy) D Nargiso (Spain) J Sánchez	3	4
(United States) B Joelson (United States) R Matuszewski	6	6
(Brazil) L Mattar (Brazil) C Motta	3	6
3	(Netherlands) J Eltingh (Netherlands) P Haarhuis	6	7
WC	(Mexico) L Lavalle (Peru) J Yzaga	6	6
(Spain) F Clavet (Spain) C Costa	3	1

Semifinals
1	(Spain) S Casal (Spain) E Sánchez	6	6	6
(United States) B Joelson (United States) R Matuszewski	2	7	3
3	(Netherlands) J Eltingh (Netherlands) P Haarhuis	6	6
WC	(Mexico) L Lavalle (Peru) J Yzaga	4	2

Final
1	(Spain) S Casal (Spain) E Sánchez	3	4
3	(Netherlands) J Eltingh (Netherlands) P Haarhuis	6	6
