= 1993 OTB International Open =

- Date: August 23–30
- Edition: 7th
- Category: ATP World Series; WTA Tier III
- Surface: Hard / outdoor
- Location: Schenectady, New York, U.S.

Champions

Men's singles
- (Sweden) Thomas Enqvist

Women's singles
- (Latvia) Larisa Neiland

Men's doubles
- (Germany) Bernd Karbacher / (Russia) Andrei Olhovskiy

Women's doubles
- (Australia) Rachel McQuillan / (Germany) Claudia Porwik
← 1992 ·	OTB International Open	· 1994 →

The 1993 OTB International Open was a combined men's and women's tennis tournament played on outdoor hard courts that was part of the World Series of the 1993 ATP Tour, and of the Tier III Series of the 1993 WTA Tour. It was the seventh edition of the tournament and was played at Schenectady, New York in the United States from August 23 through August 30, 1993. Thomas Enqvist and Larisa Neiland won the singles titles.

== Finals ==
=== Men's singles ===
(Sweden) Thomas Enqvist defeated (New Zealand) Brett Steven 4–6, 6–3, 7–6^{(7–0)}

- It was Enqvist's only title of the year and the 2nd of his career.

=== Women's singles ===
(Latvia) Larisa Neiland defeated (Ukraine) Natalia Medvedeva 6–3, 7–5

- It was Savchenko's 1st singles title of the year and the 2nd and last of her career.

=== Men's doubles ===
(Germany) Bernd Karbacher / (Russia) Andrei Olhovskiy defeated (Zimbabwe) Byron Black / (New Zealand) Brett Steven 2–6, 7–6, 6–1

- It was Karbacher's only title of the year and the 2nd of his career. It was Olhovskiy's 4th title of the year and the 4th of his career.

=== Women's doubles ===
(Australia) Rachel McQuillan / (Germany) Claudia Porwik defeated (Argentina) Florencia Labat / (Germany) Barbara Rittner 4–6, 6–4, 6–2
