= 1994 OTB International Open – Men's doubles =

Men's doubles
- 1994 OTB International Open

Final
- Champions: (Sweden) Jan Apell (Sweden) Jonas Björkman
- Runners-up: (Netherlands) Jacco Eltingh (Netherlands) Paul Haarhuis
- Score: 6–4, 7–6

Details
- Draw: 16 (3WC/1Q)
- Seeds: 4

Events
Singles	men	women
Doubles	men	women
← 1993 ·	OTB Open

Bernd Karbacher and Andrei Olhovskiy were the defending champions, but Olhovskiy did not participate this year. Karbacher partnered Alex Antonitsch, losing in the semifinals.

Jan Apell and Jonas Björkman won the title, defeating Jacco Eltingh and Paul Haarhuis 6–4, 7–6 in the final.

== Seeds ==
1. (Netherlands) Jacco Eltingh / (Netherlands) Paul Haarhuis (final)
2. (Sweden) Jan Apell / (Sweden) Jonas Björkman (champions)
3. (Germany) Marc-Kevin Goellner / (Spain) Javier Sánchez (semifinals)
4. (United Kingdom) Jeremy Bates / (Netherlands) Jan Siemerink (first round)

== Draw ==
=== Key ===
- Q = Qualifier
- WC = Wild card
- LL = Lucky loser
- Alt = Alternate
- SE = Special exempt
- PR = Protected ranking
- ITF = ITF entry
- JE = Junior exempt
- w/o = Walkover
- r = Retired
- d = Defaulted
- SR = Special ranking

=== Draw ===
First round
1	(Netherlands) J Eltingh (Netherlands) P Haarhuis	7	6
(United States) M Bauer (United States) M Lucena	6	2
(South Africa) R Deppe (Canada) B Gyetko	7	6	4
(South Africa) M Barnard (South Africa) B Haygarth	5	7	6
3	(Germany) M-K Goellner (Spain) J Sánchez	7	6
(United States) TJ Middleton (United States) J Tarango	6	4
(France) J-P Fleurian (France) R Gilbert	6	6
(United States) B Devening (United States) B Garnett	4	4
(Austria) A Antonitsch (Germany) B Karbacher	6	6
WC	(Switzerland) S Della Piana (United States) Mark Quinney	2	2
Q	(South Africa) C Haggard (United States) A Nathan	7	6
4	(United Kingdom) J Bates (Netherlands) J Siemerink	6	4
WC	(Spain) S Bruguera (Spain) C Costa	6	6
(Sweden) R Båthman (United States) R Schmidt	4	4
WC	(Sweden) T Enqvist (Sweden) N Kulti	4	2
2	(Sweden) J Apell (Sweden) J Björkman	6	6

Quarterfinals
1	(Netherlands) J Eltingh (Netherlands) P Haarhuis	6	7
(South Africa) M Barnard (South Africa) B Haygarth	2	6
3	(Germany) M-K Goellner (Spain) J Sánchez	6	3	6
(France) J-P Fleurian (France) R Gilbert	3	6	4
(Austria) A Antonitsch (Germany) B Karbacher	6	6	6
Q	(South Africa) C Haggard (United States) A Nathan	4	7	3
WC	(Spain) S Bruguera (Spain) C Costa
2	(Sweden) J Apell (Sweden) J Björkman	w/o

Semifinals
1	(Netherlands) J Eltingh (Netherlands) P Haarhuis	6	6
3	(Germany) M-K Goellner (Spain) J Sánchez	2	4
(Austria) A Antonitsch (Germany) B Karbacher	6	7	6
2	(Sweden) J Apell (Sweden) J Björkman	7	6	7

Final
1	(Netherlands) J Eltingh (Netherlands) P Haarhuis	4	6
2	(Sweden) J Apell (Sweden) J Björkman	6	7
