= 1991 OTB International Open – Women's doubles =

Women's doubles
- 1991 OTB International Open

Final
- Champions: (Australia) Rachel McQuillan (Germany) Claudia Porwik
- Runners-up: (United States) Nicole Arendt (United States) Shannan McCarthy
- Score: 6–2, 6–4

Details
- Draw: 16 (1Q)
- Seeds: 4

Events
Singles	men	women
Doubles	men	women
← 1990 ·	OTB Open	· 1992 →

Alysia May and Nana Miyagi were the defending champions, but May opted to rest after competing at Manhattan Beach the previous week. Miyagi teamed up with Yayuk Basuki and the pair was forced to retire during their first round match against Wiltrud Probst and Marianne Werdel.

Rachel McQuillan and Claudia Porwik won the title by defeating Nicole Arendt and Shannan McCarthy 6–2, 6–4 in the final.

== Seeds ==
1. (Netherlands) Manon Bollegraf / (United States) Anne Smith (semifinals)
2. (Luxembourg) Karin Kschwendt / (Netherlands) Brenda Schultz (semifinals)
3. (Argentina) Patricia Tarabini / (Hungary) Andrea Temesvári (quarterfinals)
4. (Australia) Rachel McQuillan / (Germany) Claudia Porwik (champions)

== Draw ==
=== Key ===
- Q = Qualifier
- WC = Wild card
- LL = Lucky loser
- Alt = Alternate
- SE = Special exempt
- PR = Protected ranking
- ITF = ITF entry
- JE = Junior exempt
- w/o = Walkover
- r = Retired
- d = Defaulted
- SR = Special ranking

=== Draw ===
First round
1	(Netherlands) M Bollegraf (United States) A Smith	6	6
(Soviet Union) E Brioukhovets (United States) H Cioffi	1	4
(Indonesia) Y Basuki (Japan) N Miyagi	2^{r}
(Germany) W Probst (United States) M Werdel	0
3	(Argentina) P Tarabini (Hungary) A Temesvári	6	6
(United States) D Faber (Australia) KA Guse	3	3
(United States) N Arendt (United States) S McCarthy	6	7
(Australia) T Morton (United Kingdom) C Wood	2	5
Q	(Japan) A Kijimuta (Japan) N Sawamatsu	6	6
(Argentina) B Fulco (Argentina) F Labat	4	4
(Australia) K Godridge (Czechoslovakia) E Švíglerová	1	2
4	(Australia) R McQuillan (Germany) C Porwik	6	6
(South Africa) A Coetzer (Japan) R Hiraki	3	4
(Germany) A Huber (Argentina) M Paz	6	6
(United States) P O'Reilly (United States) Terri O'Reilly	3	4
2	(Luxembourg) K Kschwendt (Netherlands) B Schultz	6	6

Quarterfinals
1	(Netherlands) M Bollegraf (United States) A Smith	6	6
(Germany) W Probst (United States) M Werdel	2	4
3	(Argentina) P Tarabini (Hungary) A Temesvári	4	2
(United States) N Arendt (United States) S McCarthy	6	6
Q	(Japan) A Kijimuta (Japan) N Sawamatsu	6	1	2
4	(Australia) R McQuillan (Germany) C Porwik	4	6	6
(Germany) A Huber (Argentina) M Paz	2	4
2	(Luxembourg) K Kschwendt (Netherlands) B Schultz	6	6

Semifinals
1	(Netherlands) M Bollegraf (United States) A Smith	1	7^{9}	5
(United States) N Arendt (United States) S McCarthy	6	6^{7}	7
4	(Australia) R McQuillan (Germany) C Porwik	7^{7}	7^{13}
2	(Luxembourg) K Kschwendt (Netherlands) B Schultz	6^{1}	6^{11}

Final
(United States) N Arendt (United States) S McCarthy	2	4
4	(Australia) R McQuillan (Germany) C Porwik	6	6
