= 1994 OTB International Open – Men's singles =

Men's singles
- 1994 OTB International Open

Final
- Champion: (Netherlands) Jacco Eltingh
- Runner-up: (United States) Chuck Adams
- Score: 6–3, 6–4

Details
- Draw: 32 (3WC/4Q)
- Seeds: 8

Events
Singles	men	women
Doubles	men	women
← 1993 ·	OTB Open

Thomas Enqvist was the defending champion, but lost in the quarterfinals this year.

Jacco Eltingh won the tournament, beating Chuck Adams in the final, 6–3, 6–4.

== Seeds ==
1. (Spain) Sergi Bruguera (second round)
2. (Spain) Carlos Costa (second round)
3. (Netherlands) Paul Haarhuis (first round)
4. (United States) Ivan Lendl (second round)
5. (Spain) Javier Sánchez (second round)
6. (Sweden) Thomas Enqvist (quarterfinals)
7. (Russia) Andrei Chesnokov (second round)
8. (Australia) Richard Fromberg (first round)

== Draw ==
=== Key ===
- Q = Qualifier
- WC = Wild card
- LL = Lucky loser
- Alt = Alternate
- ITF = ITF entry
- PR = Protected ranking
- SR = Special ranking
- SE = Special exempt
- JE = Junior exempt
- JR = Junior Accelerator Programme entrant
- CO = College Accelerator Programme entrant
- NG = Next Gen Accelerator Program entrant
- w/o = Walkover
- r = Retired
- d = Defaulted

=== Finals ===
Semifinals
(Sweden) Jonas Björkman	3	4
(United States) Chuck Adams	6	6
(Germany) Jörn Renzenbrink	6^{5}	3
(Netherlands) Jacco Eltingh	7^{7}	6

Final
(United States) Chuck Adams	3	4
(Netherlands) Jacco Eltingh	6	6

=== Top half ===
First round
1	(Spain) S Bruguera	6	6
(Russia) A Cherkasov	2	0
(Sweden) J Björkman	6	6
(Netherlands) J Siemerink	3	3
(Morocco) Y El Aynaoui	6	6
WC	(United States) J Tarango	4	4
WC	(Sweden) M Wilander	6	4	6
8	(Australia) R Fromberg	1	6	3
4	(United States) I Lendl	0	6	6
Q	(France) R Gilbert	6	2	3
(United States) C Adams	6	6
(Germany) B Karbacher	3	2
(United States) S Bryan	6	6
(United Kingdom) J Bates	3	1
Q	(Mexico) L Lavalle	5	6^{5}
6	(Sweden) T Enqvist	7	7^{7}

Second round
1	(Spain) S Bruguera	6	4	2
(Sweden) J Björkman	2	6	6
(Morocco) Y El Aynaoui	7^{7}	1	6
WC	(Sweden) M Wilander	6^{4}	6	2
4	(United States) I Lendl	6^{5}	4
(United States) C Adams	7^{7}	6
(United States) S Bryan	0	3
6	(Sweden) T Enqvist	6	6

Quarterfinals
(Sweden) J Björkman	6	6
(Morocco) Y El Aynaoui	0	1
(United States) C Adams	7^{7}	6
6	(Sweden) T Enqvist	6^{2}	3

Semifinals
(Sweden) J Björkman	3	4
(United States) C Adams	6	6

=== Bottom half ===
First round
5	(Spain) J Sánchez	6^{6}	6	6
(Spain) À Corretja	7^{8}	3	2
(Germany) J Renzenbrink	6	6
Q	(Sweden) T Högstedt	1	4
(Germany) M-C Goellner	6	6
(New Zealand) B Steven	3	4
(Austria) A Antonitsch	6	6
3	(Netherlands) P Haarhuis	3	1
7	(Russia) A Chesnokov	6	7^{7}
WC	(United States) J Arias	4	6^{3}
(France) J-P Fleurian	6^{5}	6^{4}
(Netherlands) J Eltingh	7^{7}	7^{7}
(Sweden) N Kulti	7	2	3
(Sweden) J Apell	5	6	6
Q	(United States) G Grant	3	3
2	(Spain) C Costa	6	6

Second round
5	(Spain) J Sánchez	5	6^{5}
(Germany) J Renzenbrink	7	7^{7}
(Germany) M-C Goellner	7^{7}	7^{7}
(Austria) A Antonitsch	6^{4}	6^{5}
7	(Russia) A Chesnokov	3	7^{7}	1
(Netherlands) J Eltingh	6	6^{3}	6
(Sweden) J Apell	6	6
2	(Spain) C Costa	1	4

Quarterfinals
(Germany) J Renzenbrink	6	6
(Germany) M-C Goellner	2	4
(Netherlands) J Eltingh	7^{7}	7^{7}
(Sweden) J Apell	6^{3}	6^{4}

Semifinals
(Germany) J Renzenbrink	6^{5}	3
(Netherlands) J Eltingh	7^{7}	6
