= 1990 OTB International Open – Women's singles =

Women's singles
- 1990 OTB International Open

Final
- Champion: (Germany) Anke Huber
- Runner-up: (United States) Marianne Werdel
- Score: 6–1, 5–7, 6–4

Details
- Draw: 32 (2WC/4Q/1LL)
- Seeds: 8

Events
| Singles | men | women |
| Doubles | men | women |
| ← 1989 · | OTB Open | · 1991 → |

Laura Gildemeister was the defending champion, but lost in the second round to Anke Huber.

Huber, who was 15-years old, won the title by defeating Marianne Werdel 6–1, 5–7, 6–4 in the final.

== Seeds ==
1. (Peru) Laura Gildemeister (second round)
2. (Italy) Raffaella Reggi (quarterfinals, retired)
3. (Germany) ~~Claudia Porwik~~ (withdrew)
4. (Soviet Union) Larisa Savchenko (first round)
5. (Australia) Elizabeth Smylie (second round)
6. (Argentina) Mercedes Paz (semifinals)
7. (Germany) Wiltrud Probst (semifinals)
8. (Switzerland) Cathy Caverzasio (second round)

== Draw ==
=== Key ===
- Q = Qualifier
- WC = Wild card
- LL = Lucky loser
- Alt = Alternate
- SE = Special exempt
- PR = Protected ranking
- ITF = ITF entry
- JE = Junior exempt
- w/o = Walkover
- r = Retired
- d = Defaulted
- SR = Special ranking

=== Finals ===
Semifinals
Q | (Germany) Anke Huber | 6 | 6
7 | (Germany) Wiltrud Probst | 2 | 0
WC | (United States) Marianne Werdel | 4 | 7 | 6
6 | (Argentina) Mercedes Paz | 6 | 5 | 3

Final
Q | (Germany) Anke Huber | 6 | 5 | 6
WC | (United States) Marianne Werdel | 1 | 7 | 4

=== Top half ===
First round
1 | (Peru) L Gildemeister | 6 | 6
(France) N Herreman | 4 | 1
(France) K Quentrec | 6 | 6^{3} | 0
Q | (Germany) A Huber | 2 | 7^{7} | 6
(Germany) S Hanika | 6 | 6
(Sweden) C Dahlman | 3 | 3
(Australia) R McQuillan | 4 | 0
5 | (Australia) E Smylie | 6 | 6
LL | (New Zealand) C Toleafoa | 0 | 6 | 4
(France) A Dechaume | 6 | 4 | 6
(Czechoslovakia) J Pospíšilová | 1 | 3
(Sweden) M Strandlund | 6 | 6
Q | (Argentina) B Fulco | 6 | 6
(United States) T Phelps | 2 | 3
(South Africa) A Coetzer | 6^{4} | 1
7 | (Germany) W Probst | 7^{7} | 6

Second round
1 | (Peru) L Gildemeister | 3 | 1
Q | (Germany) A Huber | 6 | 6
(Germany) S Hanika | 6 | 3 | 6
5 | (Australia) E Smylie | 2 | 6 | 4
(France) A Dechaume | 7^{7} | 3 | 7
(Sweden) M Strandlund | 6^{2} | 6 | 5
Q | (Argentina) B Fulco | 4 | 5
7 | (Germany) W Probst | 6 | 7

Quarterfinals
Q | (Germany) A Huber | 4 | 7^{8} | 2
(Germany) S Hanika | 6 | 6^{6} | 2^{r}
(France) A Dechaume | 3 | 7 | 1
7 | (Germany) W Probst | 6 | 5 | 6

Semifinals
Q | (Germany) A Huber | 6 | 6
7 | (Germany) W Probst | 2 | 0

=== Bottom half ===
First round
8 | (Switzerland) C Caverzasio | 7^{7} | 6
(Soviet Union) N Medvedeva | 6^{4} | 2
(South Africa) E Reinach | 6 | 6
Q | (Japan) A Nishiya | 2 | 2
(Italy) L Ferrando | 6 | 3 | 7^{7}
(Argentina) F Labat | 4 | 6 | 6^{3}
WC | (United States) M Werdel | 6 | 5 | 6
4 | (Soviet Union) L Savchenko | 4 | 7 | 3
6 | (Argentina) M Paz | 6 | 7
(Japan) K Date | 1 | 5
(United States) B Bowes | 5 | 4
Q | (Japan) A Kijimuta | 7 | 6
WC | (Argentina) ML Reynares | 0 | 1
(West Germany) S Hack | 6 | 6
(United States) S Stafford | 4 | 5
2 | (Italy) R Reggi | 6 | 7

Second round
8 | (Switzerland) C Caverzasio | 1 | 6^{5}
(South Africa) E Reinach | 6 | 7^{7}
(Italy) L Ferrando | 4 | 4
WC | (United States) M Werdel | 6 | 6
6 | (Argentina) M Paz | 6 | 6
Q | (Japan) A Kijimuta | 1 | 4
(West Germany) S Hack | 3 | 2
2 | (Italy) R Reggi | 6 | 6

Quarterfinals
(South Africa) E Reinach | 7 | 4 | 4
WC | (United States) M Werdel | 5 | 6 | 6
6 | (Argentina) M Paz | 6 | 4
2 | (Italy) R Reggi | 1 | 0^{r}

Semifinals
WC | (United States) M Werdel | 4 | 7 | 6
6 | (Argentina) M Paz | 6 | 5 | 3
