= 1992 OTB Schenectady Open – Men's singles =

Men's singles
- 1992 OTB Schenectady Open

Final
- Champion: (South Africa) Wayne Ferreira
- Runner-up: (Australia) Jamie Morgan
- Score: 6–2, 6–7^{(5–7)}, 6–2

Details
- Draw: 32 (3WC/4Q/2LL)
- Seeds: 8

Events
Singles	men	women
Doubles	men	women
← 1991 ·	OTB Open	· 1993 →

Michael Stich was the defending champion, but lost in the second round this year.

Wayne Ferreira won the tournament, beating Jamie Morgan in the final, 6–2, 6–7^{(5–7)}, 6–2.

== Seeds ==
1. (Germany) Michael Stich (second round)
2. (Spain) Carlos Costa (first round)
3. (South Africa) Wayne Ferreira (champion)
4. (Spain) Francisco Clavet (quarterfinals)
5. (Spain) Emilio Sánchez (semifinals)
6. (Spain) Javier Sánchez (second round)
7. (Netherlands) Paul Haarhuis (quarterfinals)
8. (Commonwealth of Independent States) Andrei Chesnokov (semifinals)

== Draw ==
=== Key ===
- Q = Qualifier
- WC = Wild card
- LL = Lucky loser
- Alt = Alternate
- SE = Special exempt
- PR = Protected ranking
- ITF = ITF entry
- JE = Junior exempt
- w/o = Walkover
- r = Retired
- d = Defaulted
- SR = Special ranking

=== Finals ===
Semifinals
8	(Commonwealth of Independent States) Andrei Chesnokov	4	2
3	(South Africa) Wayne Ferreira	6	6
5	(Spain) Emilio Sánchez	4	6^{5}
LL	(Australia) Jamie Morgan	6	7^{7}

Final
3	(South Africa) Wayne Ferreira	6	6^{5}	6
LL	(Australia) Jamie Morgan	2	7^{7}	2

=== Top half ===
First round
1	(Germany) M Stich	6	7^{7}
Q	(United States) M Blackman	3	6^{3}
(Spain) F Roig	1	3
WC	(Commonwealth of Independent States) A Olhovskiy	6	6
(United States) T Witsken	4	3
(Brazil) L Mattar	6	6
(Netherlands) M Schapers	4	6^{5}
8	(Commonwealth of Independent States) A Chesnokov	6	7^{7}
3	(South Africa) W Ferreira	7	6
LL	(Australia) G Doyle	5	2
(Mexico) L Lavalle	5	6	6
(Italy) D Nargiso	7	1	1
Q	(Australia) R Fromberg	7	6
(Australia) S Youl	5	3
Q	(Commonwealth of Independent States) Y Kafelnikov	4	4
6	(Spain) J Sánchez	6	6

Second round
1	(Germany) M Stich	2	6^{5}
WC	(Commonwealth of Independent States) A Olhovskiy	6	7^{7}
(Brazil) L Mattar	4	3
8	(Commonwealth of Independent States) A Chesnokov	6	6
3	(South Africa) W Ferreira	6	6
(Mexico) L Lavalle	4	0
Q	(Australia) R Fromberg	6	6
6	(Spain) J Sánchez	1	2

Quarterfinals
WC	(Commonwealth of Independent States) A Olhovskiy	1	6^{5}
8	(Commonwealth of Independent States) A Chesnokov	6	7^{7}
3	(South Africa) W Ferreira	6^{4}	6	6
Q	(Australia) R Fromberg	7^{7}	3	3

Semifinals
8	(Commonwealth of Independent States) A Chesnokov	4	2
3	(South Africa) W Ferreira	6	6

=== Bottom half ===
First round
5	(Spain) E Sánchez	6	7
(Germany) M Naewie	3	5
Q	(Spain) S Casal	4	6^{4}
(Netherlands) J Eltingh	6	7^{7}
(France) T Champion	6	6
(Australia) T Woodbridge	4	2
(Peru) J Yzaga	4	2
4	(Spain) F Clavet	6	6
7	(Netherlands) P Haarhuis	3
(Spain) G Lopez	3^{r}
(France) R Gilbert	3	3
(Mexico) L Herrera	6	6
LL	(Australia) J Morgan	6	6
WC	(United States) B Dunn	2	4
(Australia) M Woodforde	6	6
2	(Spain) C Costa	2	3

Second round
5	(Spain) E Sánchez	4	6	6
(Netherlands) J Eltingh	6	4	1
(France) T Champion	6	2	2
4	(Spain) F Clavet	4	6	6
7	(Netherlands) P Haarhuis	7	6
(Mexico) L Herrera	5	4
LL	(Australia) J Morgan	6	6
(Australia) M Woodforde	2	4

Quarterfinals
5	(Spain) E Sánchez	6	6
4	(Spain) F Clavet	1	2
7	(Netherlands) P Haarhuis	3	6	6^{3}
LL	(Australia) J Morgan	6	3	7^{7}

Semifinals
5	(Spain) E Sánchez	4	6^{5}
LL	(Australia) J Morgan	6	7^{7}
