= 1990 OTB International Open – Men's doubles =

Men's doubles
- 1990 OTB International Open

Final
- Champions: (Australia) Richard Fromberg (United States) Brad Pearce
- Runners-up: (United States) Brian Garrow (United States) Sven Salumaa
- Score: 6–2, 3–6, 7–6

Details
- Draw: 16 (1Q)
- Seeds: 4

Events
Singles	men	women
Doubles	men	women
← 1989 ·	OTB Open	· 1991 →

Scott Davis and Broderick Dyke were the defending champions, but did not participate this year.

Richard Fromberg and Brad Pearce won the title, defeating Brian Garrow and Sven Salumaa 6–2, 3–6, 7–6 in the final.

== Seeds ==
1. (United States) Steve DeVries / (United States) Bret Garnett (first round)
2. (United States) Brian Garrow / (United States) Sven Salumaa (final)
3. (Argentina) Martín Jaite / (Argentina) Alberto Mancini (quarterfinals)
4. (South Africa) Marius Barnard / (South Africa) Royce Deppe (quarterfinals)

== Draw ==
=== Key ===
- Q = Qualifier
- WC = Wild card
- LL = Lucky loser
- Alt = Alternate
- SE = Special exempt
- PR = Protected ranking
- ITF = ITF entry
- JE = Junior exempt
- w/o = Walkover
- r = Retired
- d = Defaulted
- SR = Special ranking

=== Draw ===
First round
1	(United States) S DeVries (United States) B Garnett	4	4
(New Zealand) S Guy (United States) J Letts	6	6
(Czechoslovakia) J Kodeš Jr. (Czechoslovakia) M Šrejber	3	6
(United States) M Anger (United States) D Flach	6	7
3	(Argentina) M Jaite (Argentina) A Mancini	6	6	6
(United States) K Lubbers (United States) O Smith	7	3	3
(United States) G Failla (United States) M Walker	4	4
(Australia) R Fromberg (United States) B Pearce	6	6
Q	(Czechoslovakia) M Střelba (United States) Tim Trigueiro	6	7
(United States) D Livingston (United States) V Van Patten	3	5
(France) T Champion (France) F Santoro	1	1
4	(South Africa) M Barnard (South Africa) R Deppe	6	6
(Australia) J Anderson (France) T Benhabiles	6	6	6
(United States) B Devening (United States) C Johnson	7	3	2
(South Africa) B Haygarth (United States) P Koscielski	6	4	6
2	(United States) B Garrow (United States) S Salumaa	4	6	7

Quarterfinals
(New Zealand) S Guy (United States) J Letts	4	5
(United States) M Anger (United States) D Flach	6	7
3	(Argentina) M Jaite (Argentina) A Mancini	6	1	1
(Australia) R Fromberg (United States) B Pearce	3	6	6
Q	(Czechoslovakia) M Střelba (United States) T Trigueiro	6	6
4	(South Africa) M Barnard (South Africa) R Deppe	4	4
(Australia) J Anderson (France) T Benhabiles	3	4
2	(United States) B Garrow (United States) S Salumaa	6	6

Semifinals
(United States) M Anger (United States) D Flach	6	4	3
(Australia) R Fromberg (United States) B Pearce	3	6	6
Q	(Czechoslovakia) M Střelba (United States) T Trigueiro	4	3
2	(United States) B Garrow (United States) S Salumaa	6	6

Final
(Australia) R Fromberg (United States) B Pearce	6	3	7
2	(United States) B Garrow (United States) S Salumaa	2	6	6
