= 1990 OTB International Open – Women's doubles =

Women's doubles
- 1990 OTB International Open

Final
- Champions: (United States) Alysia May (Japan) Nana Miyagi
- Runners-up: (Italy) Linda Ferrando (Germany) Wiltrud Probst
- Score: 6–4, 5–7, 6–3

Details
- Draw: 15
- Seeds: 4

Events
Singles	men	women
Doubles	men	women
← 1989 ·	OTB Open	· 1991 →

Michelle Jaggard and Hu Na were the defending champions, but none competed this year.

Alysia May and Nana Miyagi won the title by defeating Linda Ferrando and Wiltrud Probst 6–4, 5–7, 6–3 in the final.

== Seeds ==
The top seed received a bye to the quarterfinals.

1. (South Africa) Linda Barnard / (New Zealand) Belinda Cordwell (semifinals)
2. (France) Alexia Dechaume / (France) Nathalie Herreman (quarterfinals)
3. (Italy) Linda Ferrando / (Germany) Wiltrud Probst (final)
4. (Argentina) Bettina Fulco / (Argentina) Florencia Labat (semifinals)

== Draw ==
=== Key ===
- Q = Qualifier
- WC = Wild card
- LL = Lucky loser
- Alt = Alternate
- SE = Special exempt
- PR = Protected ranking
- ITF = ITF entry
- JE = Junior exempt
- w/o = Walkover
- r = Retired
- d = Defaulted
- SR = Special ranking

=== Draw ===
First round
(United States) B Bowes (United States) M Werdel	6	6
(United States) K Foxworth (Australia) C Thompson	3	4
3	(Italy) L Ferrando (Germany) W Probst	6	3	7^{7}
(United States) Alissa Finerman (United States) Lynn Nabors	4	6	6^{3}
(United States) J Fuchs (Sweden) M Strandlund	4	7^{8}	7^{8}
(Japan) K Date (Argentina) F Haumüller	6	6^{6}	6^{6}
(United States) J Goodling (United States) L Glitz	6	6
(Czechoslovakia) H Adámková (Sweden) C Dahlman	4	0
(South Africa) A Coetzer (South Africa) E Reinach	2	4
4	(Argentina) B Fulco (Argentina) F Labat	6	6
(Switzerland) C Caverzasio (Germany) S Hack	6	1	0
(United States) A May (Japan) N Miyagi	0	6	6
(United States) L Antonoplis (Australia) D Jones	2	3
2	(France) A Dechaume (France) N Herreman	6	6

Quarterfinals
1	(South Africa) L Barnard (New Zealand) B Cordwell	4	6	6
(United States) B Bowes (United States) M Werdel	6	0	4
3	(Italy) L Ferrando (Germany) W Probst	6	6
(United States) J Fuchs (Sweden) M Strandlund	1	3
(United States) J Goodling (United States) L Glitz	6^{10}	6	1
4	(Argentina) B Fulco (Argentina) F Labat	7^{12}	4	6
(United States) A May (Japan) N Miyagi	7	6
2	(France) A Dechaume (France) N Herreman	5	4

Semifinals
1	(South Africa) L Barnard (New Zealand) B Cordwell	3	7	3
3	(Italy) L Ferrando (Germany) W Probst	6	5	6
4	(Argentina) B Fulco (Argentina) F Labat	0	3
(United States) A May (Japan) N Miyagi	6	6

Final
3	(Italy) L Ferrando (Germany) W Probst	4	7	3
(United States) A May (Japan) N Miyagi	6	5	6
