= 1993 OTB International Open – Women's doubles =

Women's doubles
- 1993 OTB International Open

Final
- Champions: (Australia) Rachel McQuillan; (Germany) Claudia Porwik
- Runners-up: (Argentina) Florencia Labat; (Germany) Barbara Rittner
- Score: 4–6, 6–4, 6–2

Details
- Draw: 16 (1WC/1Q)
- Seeds: 4

Events
Singles	men	women
Doubles	men	women
← 1992 ·	OTB Open	· 1994 →

Alexia Dechaume and Florencia Labat were the defending champions, but Dechaume did not compete this year.

Labat teamed up with Barbara Rittner and lost in the final to Rachel McQuillan and Claudia Porwik. The score was 4–6, 6–4, 6–2.

== Seeds ==
1. (Latvia) Larisa Neiland / (Netherlands) Brenda Schultz (quarterfinals)
2. (Italy) Sandra Cecchini / (Argentina) Patricia Tarabini (quarterfinals)
3. (Russia) Eugenia Maniokova / (Georgia (country)) Leila Meskhi (first round)
4. (Argentina) Inés Gorrochategui / (United States) Linda Harvey Wild (semifinals)

== Draw ==
=== Key ===
- Q = Qualifier
- WC = Wild card
- LL = Lucky loser
- Alt = Alternate
- SE = Special exempt
- PR = Protected ranking
- ITF = ITF entry
- JE = Junior exempt
- w/o = Walkover
- r = Retired
- d = Defaulted
- SR = Special ranking

=== Draw ===
First round

Quarterfinals

Semifinals

Final

1
(Latvia) L Neiland
(Netherlands) B Schultz
6
6

- (Australia) M Jaggard-Lai
- (Australia) K Radford
3
3

1
- (Latvia) L Neiland
- (Netherlands) B Schultz
7^{10}
3
5

- (France) P Paradis-Mangon
- (France) S Testud
6
6^{5}
5

(Australia) R McQuillan
(Germany) C Porwik
6^{8}
6
7

(Australia) R McQuillan
(Germany) C Porwik
4
7^{7}
7

(Australia) R McQuillan
(Germany) C Porwik
7^{7}
3
6

4
(Argentina) I Gorrochategui
(United States) L Harvey Wild
6
6

4
- (Argentina) I Gorrochategui
- (United States) L Harvey Wild
6^{5}
6
4

- (Romania) R Dragomir
- (France) A Fusai
3
1

4
(Argentina) I Gorrochategui
(United States) L Harvey Wild
6
6

Q
- (Ukraine) E Brioukhovets
- (Kazakhstan) E Likhovtseva
6^{6}
2

WC
- (United States) S Reece
- (United States) J Steven
2
1

WC
(United States) S Reece
(United States) J Steven
7^{8}
6

(Australia) R McQuillan
(Germany) C Porwik
4
6
6

(South Africa) E Reinach
(United States) C Rubin
6
6

- (Argentina) F Labat
- (Germany) B Rittner
6
4
2

- (United Kingdom) V Lake
- (United Kingdom) C Wood
1
4

- (South Africa) E Reinach
- (United States) C Rubin
2
3

(Argentina) F Labat
(Germany) B Rittner
4
7^{7}
7^{7}

(Argentina) F Labat
(Germany) B Rittner
6
6

3
- (Russia) E Maniokova
- (Georgia (country)) L Meskhi
6
6^{5}
6^{5}

(Argentina) F Labat
(Germany) B Rittner
6
4
6

(United States) G Helgeson
(Canada) P Hy
4
6
7

- (United States) G Helgeson
- (Canada) P Hy
2
6
4

- (South Africa) M de Swardt
- (United States) M Werdel
6
4
5

(United States) G Helgeson
(Canada) P Hy
6
6

- (Italy) S Farina
- (Italy) L Ferrando
6
3
3

2
- (Italy) S Cecchini
- (Argentina) P Tarabini
3
1

2
(Italy) S Cecchini
(Argentina) P Tarabini
4
6
6
