= 1993 OTB International Open – Women's singles =

Women's singles
- 1993 OTB International Open

Final
- Champion: (Latvia) Larisa Neiland
- Runner-up: (Ukraine) Natalia Medvedeva
- Score: 6–3, 7–5

Details
- Draw: 32 (1WC/1Q)
- Seeds: 8

Events
| Singles | men | women |
| Doubles | men | women |
| ← 1992 · | OTB Open | · 1994 → |

Barbara Rittner was the defending champion, but lost in the first round to Marianne Werdel.

Larisa Neiland won the title by defeating Natalia Medvedeva 6–3, 7–5 in the final.

== Seeds ==
1. (France) Nathalie Tauziat (semifinals)
2. (Germany) Sabine Hack (second round)
3. (Austria) Judith Wiesner (quarterfinals)
4. (Netherlands) Miriam Oremans (first round)
5. (Australia) Nicole Provis (second round)
6. (Germany) Barbara Rittner (first round)
7. (Georgia (country)) Leila Meskhi (quarterfinals)
8. (Netherlands) Brenda Schultz (first round)

== Draw ==
=== Key ===
- Q = Qualifier
- WC = Wild card
- LL = Lucky loser
- Alt = Alternate
- SE = Special exempt
- PR = Protected ranking
- ITF = ITF entry
- JE = Junior exempt
- w/o = Walkover
- r = Retired
- d = Defaulted
- SR = Special ranking

=== Finals ===
Semifinals
1 | (France) Nathalie Tauziat | 5 | 6 | 6^{11}
(Latvia) Larisa Neiland | 7 | 1 | 7^{13}
(Germany) Meike Babel | 2 | 3
(Ukraine) Natalia Medvedeva | 6 | 6

Final
(Latvia) Larisa Neiland | 6 | 7
(Ukraine) Natalia Medvedeva | 3 | 5

=== Top half ===
First round
1 | (France) N Tauziat | 6 | 6
Q | (Finland) N Dahlman | 4 | 2
(Slovakia) R Zrubáková | 6^{4} | 1
(Chinese Taipei) S-t Wang | 7^{7} | 6
(United States) G Helgeson | 6 | 6
(United States) C Rubin | 2 | 1
(France) P Paradis-Mangon | 7 | 6
8 | (Netherlands) B Schultz | 5 | 0
3 | (Austria) J Wiesner | 6 | 6
LL | (United States) L Harvey Wild | 2 | 1
Q | (Japan) Y Kamio | 4 | 1
(Switzerland) E Zardo | 6 | 6
(Latvia) L Neiland | 6 | 6
(Romania) R Dragomir | 3 | 1
Q | (Germany) C Porwik | 2 | 3
5 | (Australia) N Provis | 6 | 6

Second round
1 | (France) N Tauziat | 1 | 6 | 6
(Chinese Taipei) S-t Wang | 6 | 4 | 2
(United States) G Helgeson | 7 | 6
(France) P Paradis-Mangon | 5 | 2
3 | (Austria) J Wiesner | 6 | 6
(Switzerland) E Zardo | 1 | 1
(Latvia) L Neiland | 6 | 7^{7}
5 | (Australia) N Provis | 2 | 6^{1}

Quarterfinals
1 | (France) N Tauziat | 6 | 6
(United States) G Helgeson | 3 | 3
3 | (Austria) J Wiesner | 7^{7} | 3 | 2
(Latvia) L Neiland | 6^{3} | 6 | 6

Semifinals
1 | (France) N Tauziat | 5 | 6 | 6^{11}
(Latvia) L Neiland | 7 | 1 | 7^{13}

=== Bottom half ===
First round
7 | (Georgia (country)) L Meskhi | 7 | 6
WC | (Canada) P Hy | 5 | 2
(South Africa) E Reinach | 6 | 6
(Netherlands) S Rottier | 1 | 0
(Germany) M Babel | 7 | 6
(France) A Fusai | 5 | 0
(Mexico) A Gavaldón | 7^{7} | 4 | 6
4 | (Netherlands) M Oremans | 6^{3} | 6 | 3
6 | (Germany) B Rittner | 3 | 6 | 1
(United States) M Werdel | 6 | 3 | 6
(Germany) V Martinek | 1 | 6 | 3
WC | (Sweden) Å Carlsson | 6 | 2 | 6
(Argentina) F Labat | 6 | 3 | 2
(Ukraine) N Medvedeva | 4 | 6 | 6
Q | (Australia) R McQuillan | 4 | 3
2 | (Germany) S Hack | 6 | 6

Second round
7 | (Georgia (country)) L Meskhi | 6 | 6
(South Africa) E Reinach | 2 | 4
(Germany) M Babel | 7 | 6
(Mexico) A Gavaldón | 5 | 2
(United States) M Werdel | 6 | 4 | 1
WC | (Sweden) Å Carlsson | 2 | 6 | 6
(Ukraine) N Medvedeva | 4 | 6 | 6
2 | (Germany) S Hack | 6 | 1 | 2

Quarterfinals
7 | (Georgia (country)) L Meskhi | 5 | 2
(Germany) M Babel | 7 | 6
WC | (Sweden) Å Carlsson | 0 | 3
(Ukraine) N Medvedeva | 6 | 6

Semifinals
(Germany) M Babel | 2 | 3
(Ukraine) N Medvedeva | 6 | 6
