= 1991 OTB International Open – Women's singles =

Women's singles
- 1991 OTB International Open

Final
- Champion: (Netherlands) Brenda Schultz
- Runner-up: (France) Alexia Dechaume
- Score: 7–6^{(7–5)}, 6–2

Details
- Draw: 32 (2WC/4Q)
- Seeds: 8

Events
Singles	men	women
Doubles	men	women
← 1990 ·	OTB Open	· 1992 →

Anke Huber was the defending champion, but lost in the quarterfinals to Alexia Dechaume.

Brenda Schultz won the title by defeating Dechaume 7–6^{(7–5)}, 6–2 in the final.

== Seeds ==
1. (Germany) Anke Huber (quarterfinals)
2. (France) Julie Halard (second round)
3. (United States) Marianne Werdel (semifinals)
4. (Australia) Rachel McQuillan (quarterfinals)
5. (Japan) Naoko Sawamatsu (quarterfinals)
6. (Netherlands) Manon Bollegraf (second round)
7. (Netherlands) Brenda Schultz (champion)
8. (Soviet Union) Elena Brioukhovets (first round)

== Draw ==
=== Key ===
- Q = Qualifier
- WC = Wild card
- LL = Lucky loser
- Alt = Alternate
- SE = Special exempt
- PR = Protected ranking
- ITF = ITF entry
- JE = Junior exempt
- w/o = Walkover
- r = Retired
- d = Defaulted
- SR = Special ranking

=== Finals ===
Semifinals
(France) Alexia Dechaume	6	6
3	(United States) Marianne Werdel	1	3
7	(Netherlands) Brenda Schultz	5	7	6
(Australia) Nicole Provis	7	5	3

Final
(France) Alexia Dechaume	6^{5}	2
7	(Netherlands) Brenda Schultz	7^{7}	6

=== Top half ===
First round
1	(Germany) A Huber	6	7
(Argentina) B Fulco	0	5
Q	(France) S Testud	4	6	3
WC	(United States) L Davenport	6	3	6
(Luxembourg) K Kschwendt	7^{8}	6
(United States) A Grossman	6^{6}	4
(France) A Dechaume	6	6
8	(Soviet Union) E Brioukhovets	3	4
3	(United States) M Werdel	4	6	7^{7}
(Argentina) M Paz	6	2	6^{3}
(South Africa) A Coetzer	2	3
(France) P Paradis-Mangon	6	6
(Germany) B Rittner	6	6
WC	(United States) S Birch	0	1
Q	(United States) S Martin	3	2
5	(Japan) N Sawamatsu	6	6

Second round
1	(Germany) A Huber	6	7
WC	(United States) L Davenport	1	5
(Luxembourg) K Kschwendt	4	4
(France) A Dechaume	6	6
3	(United States) M Werdel	6	4	7
(France) P Paradis-Mangon	2	6	5
(Germany) B Rittner	2	2
5	(Japan) N Sawamatsu	6	6

Quarterfinals
1	(Germany) A Huber	3	4
(France) A Dechaume	6	6
3	(United States) M Werdel	6	6
5	(Japan) N Sawamatsu	3	2

Semifinals
(France) A Dechaume	6	6
3	(United States) M Werdel	1	3

=== Bottom half ===
First round
7	(Netherlands) B Schultz	6	6
Q	(United States) T Whitlinger	1	1
(Germany) W Probst	7	3	6
(United States) D Faber	5	6	4
(Czechoslovakia) E Švíglerová	6	6
Q	(New Zealand) C Toleafoa	1	0
(Australia) K Godridge	3	2
4	(Australia) R McQuillan	6	6
6	(Netherlands) M Bollegraf	2	6	7^{7}
(Czechoslovakia) Z Málková	6	1	6^{4}
(Hungary) A Temesvári	4	6	5
(Argentina) F Labat	6	4	7
(United States) H Cioffi	6	1	3
(Australia) N Provis	4	6	6
(Germany) C Porwik	6	4	2
2	(France) J Halard	1	6	6

Second round
7	(Netherlands) B Schultz	6	6
(Germany) W Probst	3	2
(Czechoslovakia) E Švíglerová	6^{3}	1
4	(Australia) R McQuillan	7^{7}	6
6	(Netherlands) M Bollegraf	2	3
(Argentina) F Labat	6	6
(Australia) N Provis	5	6	6
2	(France) J Halard	7	2	2

Quarterfinals
7	(Netherlands) B Schultz	4	6	6
4	(Australia) R McQuillan	6	4	2
(Argentina) F Labat	5	3
(Australia) N Provis	7	6

Semifinals
7	(Netherlands) B Schultz	5	7	6
(Australia) N Provis	7	5	3
