= 1991 OTB International Open – Men's doubles =

Men's doubles
- 1991 OTB International Open

Final
- Champions: (Spain) Javier Sánchez (Australia) Todd Woodbridge
- Runners-up: (Ecuador) Andrés Gómez (Spain) Emilio Sánchez
- Score: 3–6, 7–6, 7–6

Details
- Draw: 16
- Seeds: 4

Events
Singles	men	women
Doubles	men	women
- OTB Open

Richard Fromberg and Brad Pearce were the defending champions, but Pearce did not participate this year. Fromberg partnered Jason Stoltenberg, losing in the semifinals.

Javier Sánchez and Todd Woodbridge won the title, defeating Andrés Gómez and Emilio Sánchez 3–6, 7–6, 7–6 in the final.

== Seeds ==
1. (Spain) Javier Sánchez / (Australia) Todd Woodbridge (champions)
2. (Germany) Udo Riglewski / (Germany) Michael Stich (first round)
3. (Ecuador) Andrés Gómez / (Spain) Emilio Sánchez (final)
4. (Spain) Sergi Bruguera / (Spain) Tomás Carbonell (quarterfinals)

== Draw ==
Key

- Q = Qualifier
- WC = Wild card
- LL = Lucky loser
- Alt = Alternate
- ITF = ITF entry
- PR = Protected ranking
- SR = Special ranking
- SE = Special exempt
- JE = Junior exempt
- JR = Junior Accelerator Programme entrant
- CO = College Accelerator Programme entrant
- NG = Next Gen Accelerator Program entrant
- w/o = Walkover
- r = Retired
- d = Defaulted

=== Draw ===
First round
1	(Spain) J Sánchez (Australia) T Woodbridge	6	6
(Republic of Ireland) E Collins (United States) B Joelson	4	0
(United States) P Koscielski (United States) B Steel	2	2
(United States) J Arias (United States) J Sobel	6	6
4	(Spain) S Bruguera (Spain) T Carbonell	6	6
LL	(The Bahamas) M Knowles (India) R Krishnan	2	3
(Spain) F Clavet (Austria) H Skoff	5	3
(Australia) R Fromberg (Australia) J Stoltenberg	7	6
(South Africa) D Adams (New Zealand) S Guy	6	3
(United States) D Eisenman (United States) T Scherman	7	6
(South Africa) C Campbell (United States) J Tarango	2	1
3	(Ecuador) A Gómez (Spain) E Sánchez	6	6
WC	(Soviet Union) A Cherkasov (Soviet Union) A Volkov	6	6	6
Q	(Sweden) M Renström (Sweden) M Tillström	7	4	1
(Netherlands) J Eltingh (Netherlands) P Haarhuis	4	6	6
2	(Germany) U Riglewski (Germany) M Stich	6	3	1

Quarterfinals
1	(Spain) J Sánchez (Australia) T Woodbridge	7	6
(United States) J Arias (United States) J Sobel	6	2
4	(Spain) S Bruguera (Spain) T Carbonell	6	6	4
(Australia) R Fromberg (Australia) J Stoltenberg	4	7	6
(United States) D Eisenman (United States) T Scherman	6	6
3	(Ecuador) A Gómez (Spain) E Sánchez	7	7
WC	(Soviet Union) A Cherkasov (Soviet Union) A Volkov	2	6	5
(Netherlands) J Eltingh (Netherlands) P Haarhuis	6	1	7

Semifinals
1	(Spain) J Sánchez (Australia) T Woodbridge	5	6	6
(Australia) R Fromberg (Australia) J Stoltenberg	7	2	3
3	(Ecuador) A Gómez (Spain) E Sánchez	6	6	6
(Netherlands) J Eltingh (Netherlands) P Haarhuis	3	7	3

Final
1	(Spain) J Sánchez (Australia) T Woodbridge	3	7	7
3	(Ecuador) A Gómez (Spain) E Sánchez	6	6	6
