= 1992 OTB Schenectady Open – Women's singles =

Women's singles
- 1992 OTB Schenectady Open

Final
- Champion: (Germany) Barbara Rittner
- Runner-up: (Netherlands) Brenda Schultz
- Score: 7–6^{(7–3)}, 6–3

Details
- Draw: 32 (2WC/4Q)
- Seeds: 8

Events
Singles	men	women
Doubles	men	women
← 1991 ·	OTB Open	· 1993 →

Brenda Schultz was the defending champion, but lost in the final to Barbara Rittner. The score was 7–6^{(7–3)}, 6–3.

== Seeds ==
1. (Czechoslovakia) Helena Suková (second round)
2. (Czechoslovakia) Radka Zrubáková (quarterfinals)
3. (Germany) Barbara Rittner (champion)
4. (Netherlands) Brenda Schultz (final)
5. (Peru) Laura Gildemeister (second round)
6. (Commonwealth of Independent States) Natalia Medvedeva (first round)
7. (Australia) Nicole Provis (first round)
8. (Australia) Rachel McQuillan (first round)

== Draw ==
=== Key ===
- Q = Qualifier
- WC = Wild card
- LL = Lucky loser
- Alt = Alternate
- SE = Special exempt
- PR = Protected ranking
- ITF = ITF entry
- JE = Junior exempt
- w/o = Walkover
- r = Retired
- d = Defaulted
- SR = Special ranking

=== Finals ===
Semifinals
(United States) Marianne Werdel	1	r
3	(Germany) Barbara Rittner	6
4	(Netherlands) Brenda Schultz	6	6
(Argentina) Florencia Labat	1	4

Final
3	(Germany) Barbara Rittner	7^{7}	6
4	(Netherlands) Brenda Schultz	6^{3}	3

=== Top half ===
First round
1	(Czechoslovakia) H Suková	6	6
(Belgium) D Monami	3	4
(Italy) L Ferrando	2	1
(United States) M Werdel	6	6
Q	(Netherlands) S Rottier	6	6
(Germany) C Porwik	3	1
(United States) S Sloane-Lundy	3	5
5	(Peru) L Gildemeister	6	7
3	(Germany) B Rittner	6	6
(Croatia) I Majoli	3	2
(France) S Testud	6	6
(United States) L Harvey-Wild	4	1
(France) A Dechaume	6	6
(United States) D Faber	4	1
Q	(Chinese Taipei) S-t Wang	6	1	6
8	(Australia) R McQuillan	1	6	1

Second round
1	(Czechoslovakia) H Suková	5	6^{3}
(United States) M Werdel	7	7^{7}
Q	(Netherlands) S Rottier	6	6
5	(Peru) L Gildemeister	4	4
3	(Germany) B Rittner	6^{5}	6	6
(France) S Testud	7^{7}	3	3
(France) A Dechaume	4	6	6
Q	(Chinese Taipei) S-t Wang	6	2	3

Quarterfinals
(United States) M Werdel	6	6
Q	(Netherlands) S Rottier	4	4
3	(Germany) B Rittner	6	6
(France) A Dechaume	2	2

Semifinals
(United States) M Werdel	1	r
3	(Germany) B Rittner	6

=== Bottom half ===
First round
7	(Australia) N Provis	6^{6}	6	2
(Germany) M Babel	7^{8}	3	6
WC	(United States) B Nagelsen	3	5
(Canada) H Kelesi	6	7
(Australia) J Byrne	5	1
(United States) T Whitlinger	7	6
(France) P Paradis-Mangon	6	4	3
4	(Netherlands) B Schultz	4	6	6
6	(Commonwealth of Independent States) N Medvedeva	6	3	4
(Argentina) F Labat	4	6	6
WC	(United States) C Rubin	1	7	6
Q	(United States) G Helgeson	6	5	2
(South Africa) M de Swardt	2	5
Q	(Netherlands) M Oremans	6	7
(Austria) B Paulus	7	3	2
2	(Czechoslovakia) R Zrubáková	5	6	6

Second round
(Germany) M Babel	6	4	4
(Canada) H Kelesi	3	6	6
(United States) T Whitlinger	3	2
4	(Netherlands) B Schultz	6	6
(Argentina) F Labat	3	6	6
WC	(United States) C Rubin	6	3	2
Q	(Netherlands) M Oremans	3	2
2	(Czechoslovakia) R Zrubáková	6	6

Quarterfinals
(Canada) H Kelesi	2	3
4	(Netherlands) B Schultz	6	6
(Argentina) F Labat	6	4	6
2	(Czechoslovakia) R Zrubáková	4	6	2

Semifinals
4	(Netherlands) B Schultz	6	6
(Argentina) F Labat	1	4
