= 1990 OTB International Open =

- Date: August 20–27
- Edition: 4th
- Category: World Series (ATP); Tier IV (WTA)
- Draw: 28S / 16D
- Surface: Hard / outdoor
- Location: Schenectady, New York, U.S.

Champions

Men's singles
- (India) Ramesh Krishnan

Women's singles
- (Germany) Anke Huber

Men's doubles
- (Australia) Richard Fromberg / (United States) Brad Pearce

Women's doubles
- (United States) Alysia May / (Japan) Nana Miyagi
← 1989 ·	OTB International Open	· 1991 →

The 1990 OTB International Open was a combined men's and women's tennis tournament played on outdoor hard courts that was part of the World Series of the 1990 ATP Tour and of the Tier IV of the 1990 WTA Tour. It was the fourth edition of the tournament and was played at Schenectady, New York in the United States from August 20 through August 27, 1990. Ramesh Krishnan and Anke Huber won the singles titles.

== Finals ==
=== Men's singles ===
(India) Ramesh Krishnan defeated (New Zealand) Kelly Evernden 6–1, 6–1

- It was Krishnan's only title of the year and the 9th of his career.

=== Women's singles ===
(Germany) Anke Huber defeated (United States) Marianne Werdel 6–1, 5–7, 6–4

- It was Huber's first singles title of her career.

=== Men's doubles ===
(Australia) Richard Fromberg / (United States) Brad Pearce defeated (United States) Brian Garrow / (United States) Sven Salumaa 6–2, 3–6, 7–6

- It was Fromberg's 3rd title of the year and the 3rd of his career. It was Pearce's only title of the year and the 3rd of his career.

=== Women's doubles ===
(United States) Alysia May / (Japan) Nana Miyagi defeated (Italy) Linda Ferrando / (Germany) Wiltrud Probst 6–4, 5–7, 6–3
