= 1992 French Open – Women's singles qualifying =

Women's singles qualifying
- 1992 French Open

Events
Singles	men	women		boys	girls
Doubles	men	women	mixed	boys	girls
WC Singles	men	women	quad
WC Doubles	men	women	quad
Legends	−45	45+	women

Qualification
Singles	men	women
- French Open

Players who neither had high enough rankings nor received wild cards to enter the main draw of the annual French Open Tennis Championships participated in a qualifying tournament held in the week before the event.

== Seeds ==
1. (Italy) Laura Golarsa (first round)
2. (Czechoslovakia) Petra Langrová (qualifying competition, lucky loser)
3. (Australia) Kristin Godridge (second round)
4. (Slovenia) Barbara Mulej (first round)
5. (Belgium) Sandra Wasserman (qualified)
6. (United States) Shaun Stafford (qualified)
7. (Czechoslovakia) Denisa Krajčovičová (qualifying competition, lucky loser)
8. (Spain) Virginia Ruano Pascual (second round)
9. (Romania) Irina Spîrlea (qualified)
10. (Czechoslovakia) Radka Bobková (qualifying competition)
11. (Spain) Cristina Torrens Valero (second round)
12. (Hungary) Anna Földényi (qualifying competition)
13. (Australia) Louise Field (first round)
14. (Australia) Michelle Jaggard-Lai (first round)
15. (United States) Jessica Emmons (first round)
16. (Australia) Jo-Anne Faull (second round)

== Qualifiers ==
1. (Germany) Karin Kschwendt
2. (Austria) Sandra Dopfer
3. (Austria) Beate Reinstadler
4. (United States) Shaun Stafford
5. (Argentina) María Luciana Reynares
6. (Romania) Irina Spîrlea
7. (Belgium) Sandra Wasserman
8. (Netherlands) Kristie Boogert

== Lucky losers ==
1. (Czechoslovakia) Denisa Krajčovičová
2. (Czechoslovakia) Petra Langrová

== Qualifying draw ==
Key

- Q = Qualifier
- WC = Wild card
- LL = Lucky loser
- Alt = Alternate
- ITF = ITF entry
- PR = Protected ranking
- SR = Special ranking
- SE = Special exempt
- JE = Junior exempt
- JR = Junior Accelerator Programme entrant
- CO = College Accelerator Programme entrant
- NG = Next Gen Accelerator Program entrant
- w/o = Walkover
- r = Retired
- d = Defaulted

=== First qualifier ===
First round
1	(Italy) Laura Golarsa	5	4
(United States) Lindsay Davenport	7	6
(Germany) Karin Kschwendt	6	7^{7}
(Netherlands) Claire Wegink	3	6^{4}
(New Zealand) Claudine Toleafoa	0	1
(Czechoslovakia) Leona Lásková	6	6
(Spain) Ana Segura	3	3
12	(Hungary) Anna Földényi	6	6

Second round
(United States) Lindsay Davenport	3	0
(Germany) Karin Kschwendt	6	6
(Czechoslovakia) Leona Lásková	4	2
12	(Hungary) Anna Földényi	6	6

Qualifying competition
(Germany) Karin Kschwendt	6	6
12	(Hungary) Anna Földényi	1	1

=== Second qualifier ===
First round
10	(Czechoslovakia) Radka Bobková	7	2	7
(United States) Jolene Watanabe	5	6	5
(United Kingdom) Amanda Grunfeld	1	6	2
(United Kingdom) Clare Wood	6	3	6
(Austria) Sandra Dopfer	7^{9}	7^{7}
(Netherlands) Monique Kiene	6^{7}	6^{5}
WC	(France) Pascale Etchemendy	7	2	2
8	(Spain) Virginia Ruano Pascual	5	6	6

Second round
10	(Czechoslovakia) Radka Bobková	6	6
(United Kingdom) Clare Wood	3	1
(Austria) Sandra Dopfer	6	6
8	(Spain) Virginia Ruano Pascual	3	0

Qualifying competition
10	(Czechoslovakia) Radka Bobková	4	6	1
(Austria) Sandra Dopfer	6	4	6

=== Third qualifier ===
First round
4	(Slovenia) Barbara Mulej	4	2
(South Africa) Joannette Kruger	6	6
(Germany) Sabine Gerke	3	2
WC	(France) Sylvie Sabas	6	6
(Denmark) Sofie Albinus	6^{4}	3
(Austria) Beate Reinstadler	7^{7}	6
WC	(France) Cécile Dorey	6	5	6
14	(Australia) Michelle Jaggard-Lai	0	7	4

Second round
(South Africa) Joannette Kruger	7^{10}	3	6
WC	(France) Sylvie Sabas	6^{8}	6	3
(Austria) Beate Reinstadler	6	7
WC	(France) Cécile Dorey	3	5

Qualifying competition
(South Africa) Joannette Kruger	1	1
(Austria) Beate Reinstadler	6	6

=== Fourth qualifier ===
First round
16	(Australia) Jo-Anne Faull	7	6
WC	(France) Sarah Pitkowski-Malcor	5	2
(Austria) Heidi Sprung	4	3
(United States) Jennifer Santrock	6	6
WC	(France) Axelle Thomas	6	6
(Australia) Joanne Limmer	2	0
(United States) Elise Burgin	5	0
6	(United States) Shaun Stafford	7	6

Second round
16	(Australia) Jo-Anne Faull	5	2
(United States) Jennifer Santrock	7	6
WC	(France) Axelle Thomas	7^{7}	1	3
6	(United States) Shaun Stafford	6^{4}	6	6

Qualifying competition
(United States) Jennifer Santrock	2	3
6	(United States) Shaun Stafford	6	6

=== Fifth qualifier ===
First round
7	(Czechoslovakia) Denisa Krajčovičová	6	7^{7}
WC	(France) Olivia De Camaret	4	6^{3}
(Spain) Estefanía Bottini	6	4	6
WC	(France) Carole Lucarelli	2	6	4
(Argentina) María Luciana Reynares	6	6
(Czechoslovakia) Jana Pospíšilová	4	3
(Japan) Tamaka Takagi	4	2
11	(Spain) Cristina Torrens Valero	6	6

Second round
7	(Czechoslovakia) Denisa Krajčovičová	6	6
(Spain) Estefanía Bottini	3	3
(Argentina) María Luciana Reynares	6	2	6
11	(Spain) Cristina Torrens Valero	2	6	1

Qualifying competition
7	(Czechoslovakia) Denisa Krajčovičová	5	6^{7}
(Argentina) María Luciana Reynares	7	7^{9}

=== Sixth qualifier ===
First round
9	(Romania) Irina Spîrlea	6	4	6
(United States) Stacey Martin	4	6	4
(Belgium) Ann Devries	6^{5}	1
(Sweden) Maria Strandlund	7^{7}	6
(Australia) Louise Stacey	4	4
(Austria) Marion Maruska	6	6
(France) Maïder Laval	2	6	2
3	(Australia) Kristin Godridge	6	3	6

Second round
9	(Romania) Irina Spîrlea	6	6
(Sweden) Maria Strandlund	3	4
(Austria) Marion Maruska	6	7^{7}
3	(Australia) Kristin Godridge	2	6^{2}

Qualifying competition
9	(Romania) Irina Spîrlea	6	3	6
(Austria) Marion Maruska	3	6	3

=== Seventh qualifier ===
First round
5	(Belgium) Sandra Wasserman	7	6
(Belgium) Els Callens	5	0
(United States) Patti O'Reilly	0	5
(Netherlands) Miriam Oremans	6	7
(Mexico) Angélica Gavaldón	5	6	6
(United States) Camille Benjamin	7	1	4
(Canada) Maureen Drake	6	6
13	(Australia) Louise Field	1	0

Second round
5	(Belgium) Sandra Wasserman	6	7
(Netherlands) Miriam Oremans	3	5
(Mexico) Angélica Gavaldón	6	6
(Canada) Maureen Drake	0	0

Qualifying competition
5	(Belgium) Sandra Wasserman	6	6
(Mexico) Angélica Gavaldón	1	0

=== Eighth qualifier ===
First round
15	(United States) Jessica Emmons	4	4
(Netherlands) Kristie Boogert	6	6
(Latvia) Agnese Gustmane	4	3
(Germany) Tanja Hauschildt	6	6
(Australia) Kerry-Anne Guse	1	1
WC	(France) Lea Ghirardi	6	6
(United States) Pam Nelson	3	1
2	(Czechoslovakia) Petra Langrová	6	6

Second round
(Netherlands) Kristie Boogert	6	7
(Germany) Tanja Hauschildt	3	5
WC	(France) Lea Ghirardi	3	1
2	(Czechoslovakia) Petra Langrová	6	6

Qualifying competition
(Netherlands) Kristie Boogert	6	6
2	(Czechoslovakia) Petra Langrová	3	1
