= 1994 OTB International Open =

- Date: August 22–29
- Edition: 8th
- Category: ATP World Series; WTA Tier III
- Surface: Hard / outdoor
- Location: Schenectady, New York, U.S.

Champions

Men's singles
- (Netherlands) Jacco Eltingh

Women's singles
- (Austria) Judith Wiesner

Men's doubles
- (Sweden) Jan Apell / (Sweden) Jonas Björkman

Women's doubles
- (United States) Meredith McGrath / (Latvia) Larisa Neiland
| ← 1993 · | OTB Open |

The 1994 OTB International Open was a combined men's and women's tennis tournament played on outdoor hard courts that was part of the World Series of the 1994 ATP Tour and WTA Tier III of the 1994 WTA Tour. It was the eighth edition of the tournament and was held in Schenectady, New York in the United States from August 22 through August 29, 1994. Jacco Eltingh and Judith Wiesner won the singles titles.

== Finals ==
=== Men's singles ===
(Netherlands) Jacco Eltingh defeated (United States) Chuck Adams 6–3, 6–4

- It was Eltingh's 1st singles title of the year and the 3rd of his career.

=== Women's singles ===
(Austria) Judith Wiesner defeated (Latvia) Larisa Neiland 7–5, 3–6, 6–4

- It was Wiesner's 1st singles title of the year and the 4th of her career.

=== Men's doubles ===
(Sweden) Jan Apell / (Sweden) Jonas Björkman defeated (Netherlands) Jacco Eltingh / (Netherlands) Paul Haarhuis 6–4, 7–6

- It was Apell's 3rd title of the year and the 4th of his career. It was Björkman's 3rd title of the year and the 3rd of his career.

=== Women's doubles ===
(United States) Meredith McGrath / (Latvia) Larisa Neiland defeated (United States) Pam Shriver / (Australia) Elizabeth Smylie 6–2, 6–2
