= 1992 OTB Schenectady Open – Women's doubles =

Women's doubles
- 1992 OTB Schenectady Open

Final
- Champions: (France) Alexia Dechaume (Argentina) Florencia Labat
- Runners-up: (United States) Ginger Helgeson (United States) Shannan McCarthy
- Score: 6–3, 1–6, 6–2

Details
- Draw: 16 (1WC/1Q/1LL)
- Seeds: 4

Events
Singles	men	women
Doubles	men	women
← 1991 ·	OTB Open	· 1993 →

Rachel McQuillan and Claudia Porwik were the defending champions, but lost in the quarterfinals to Ginger Helgeson and Shannan McCarthy.

Alexia Dechaume and Florencia Labat won the title by defeating Helgeson and McCarthy 6–3, 1–6, 6–2 in the final.

== Seeds ==
1. (Australia) Nicole Provis / (South Africa) Elna Reinach (first round)
2. (Australia) Rachel McQuillan / (Germany) Claudia Porwik (quarterfinals)
3. (South Africa) Mariaan de Swardt / (Netherlands) Brenda Schultz (quarterfinals)
4. (France) Alexia Dechaume / (Argentina) Florencia Labat (champions)

== Draw ==
=== Key ===
- Q = Qualifier
- WC = Wild card
- LL = Lucky loser
- Alt = Alternate
- SE = Special exempt
- PR = Protected ranking
- ITF = ITF entry
- JE = Junior exempt
- w/o = Walkover
- r = Retired
- d = Defaulted
- SR = Special ranking

=== Draw ===
First round
1	(Australia) N Provis (South Africa) E Reinach	6	6^{6}	4
(Peru) L Gildemeister (United States) M Werdel	4	7^{8}	6
(Argentina) B Fulco-Villella (Austria) P Ritter	1	6	3
Q	(United States) L Davenport (United States) C Rubin	6	2	6
4	(France) A Dechaume (Argentina) F Labat	6	2	6
(Hungary) A Temesvári (Czechoslovakia) R Zrubáková	4	6	0
(Australia) K Godridge (Australia) T Morton	4	5
LL	(United States) E Rossides (Belgium) D Monami	6	7
(Netherlands) I Driehuis (France) N van Lottum	3	4
(United States) L Harvey Wild (Australia) E Smylie	6	6
(Commonwealth of Independent States) E Brioukhovets (Commonwealth of Independent States) N Medvedeva	3	1
3	(South Africa) M de Swardt (Netherlands) B Schultz	6	6
WC	(Australia) J Byrne (Italy) L Ferrando	3	6^{4}
(United States) G Helgeson (United States) S McCarthy	6	7^{7}
(France) P Paradis (France) S Testud	2	3
2	(Australia) R McQuillan (Germany) C Porwik	6	6

Quarterfinals
(Peru) L Gildemeister (United States) M Werdel	1	4
Q	(United States) L Davenport (United States) C Rubin	6	6
4	(France) A Dechaume (Argentina) F Labat	6	6
LL	(United States) E Rossides (Belgium) D Monami	2	0
(United States) L Harvey Wild (Australia) E Smylie	6^{5}	7^{7}	6
3	(South Africa) M de Swardt (Netherlands) B Schultz	7^{7}	6^{2}	4
(United States) G Helgeson (United States) S McCarthy	6	4	7
2	(Australia) R McQuillan (Germany) C Porwik	3	6	5

Semifinals
Q	(United States) L Davenport (United States) C Rubin	6	2	4
4	(France) A Dechaume (Argentina) F Labat	4	6	6
(United States) L Harvey Wild (Australia) E Smylie	3	6^{6}
(United States) G Helgeson (United States) S McCarthy	6	7^{8}

Final
4	(France) A Dechaume (Argentina) F Labat	6	1	6
(United States) G Helgeson (United States) S McCarthy	3	6	2
