= 1992 OTB Schenectady Open =

- Date: August 24–31
- Edition: 6th
- Category: ATP World Series; WTA Tier V
- Surface: Hard / outdoor
- Location: Schenectady, New York

Champions

Men's singles
- (South Africa) Wayne Ferreira

Women's singles
- (Germany) Barbara Rittner

Men's doubles
- (Netherlands) Jacco Eltingh / (Netherlands) Paul Haarhuis

Women's doubles
- (France) Alexia Dechaume / (Argentina) Florencia Labat
← 1991 ·	Schenectady Open	· 1993 →

The 1992 OTB Schenectady Open was a combined men's and women's tennis tournament played on outdoor hard courts that was part of the World Series of the 1992 ATP Tour and Tier V of the 1992 WTA Tour. It was the sixth edition of the tournament and was played in Schenectady, New York in the United States from August 24 through August 31, 1992. Wayne Ferreira and Barbara Rittner won the singles titles.

== Finals ==
=== Men's singles ===
(South Africa) Wayne Ferreira defeated (Australia) Jamie Morgan 6–2, 6–7^{(5–7)}, 6–2

- It was Ferreira's 3rd title of the year and the 5th of his career.

=== Women's singles ===
(Germany) Barbara Rittner defeated (Netherlands) Brenda Schultz 7–6^{(7–3)}, 6–3

- It was Rittner's first singles title of her career.

=== Men's doubles ===
(Netherlands) Jacco Eltingh / (Netherlands) Paul Haarhuis defeated (Spain) Sergio Casal / (Spain) Emilio Sánchez 6–3, 6–4

- It was Eltingh's 2nd title of the year and the 6th of his career. It was Haarhuis' 2nd title of the year and the 6th of his career.

=== Women's doubles ===
(France) Alexia Dechaume / (Argentina) Florencia Labat defeated (United States) Ginger Helgeson / (United States) Shannan McCarthy 6–3, 1–6, 6–2
