= 1993 OTB International Open – Men's singles =

Men's singles
- 1993 OTB International Open

Final
- Champion: (Sweden) Thomas Enqvist
- Runner-up: (New Zealand) Brett Steven
- Score: 4–6, 6–3, 7–6^{(7–0)}

Details
- Draw: 32
- Seeds: 8

Events
Singles	men	women
Doubles	men	women
← 1992 ·	OTB International Open	· 1994 →

Wayne Ferreira was the defending champion, but did not participate this year.

Thomas Enqvist won the tournament, beating Brett Steven in the final, 4–6, 6–3, 7–6^{(7–0)}.

== Seeds ==
1. (United States) Ivan Lendl (quarterfinals)
2. (Czech Republic) Karel Nováček (semifinals)
3. (Israel) Amos Mansdorf (first round, retired)
4. (Spain) Emilio Sánchez (first round)
5. (Spain) Javier Sánchez (quarterfinals)
6. (Spain) Carlos Costa (semifinals)
7. (Sweden) Mikael Pernfors (quarterfinals)
8. (Germany) Bernd Karbacher (second round)

== Draw ==
Key

- Q = Qualifier
- WC = Wild card
- LL = Lucky loser
- Alt = Alternate
- ITF = ITF entry
- PR = Protected ranking
- SR = Special ranking
- SE = Special exempt
- JE = Junior exempt
- JR = Junior Accelerator Programme entrant
- CO = College Accelerator Programme entrant
- NG = Next Gen Accelerator Program entrant
- w/o = Walkover
- r = Retired
- d = Defaulted

=== Finals ===
Semifinals
(Sweden) Thomas Enqvist	6	6
6	(Spain) Carlos Costa	1	4
(New Zealand) Brett Steven	6	6
2	(Czech Republic) Karel Nováček	3	1

Final
(Sweden) Thomas Enqvist	4	6	7^{7}
(New Zealand) Brett Steven	6	3	6^{0}

=== Top half ===
First round
1/WC	(United States) I Lendl	7	6
(France) G Raoux	5	3
Q	(Germany) J Renzenbrink	6	6
(Netherlands) J Eltingh	4	4
(Sweden) T Enqvist	6	6
(United States) R Rostagno	3	0
(Brazil) J Oncins	1	6^{4}
8	(Germany) B Karbacher	6	7^{7}
4	(Spain) E Sánchez	1	3
(Australia) R Fromberg	6	6
(Zimbabwe) B Black	3	4
Q	(Denmark) K Carlsen	6	6
(Netherlands) P Haarhuis	6	6
Q	(Italy) D Nargiso	3	2
(Russia) A Olhovskiy	6^{4}	6	4
6	(Spain) C Costa	7^{7}	4	6

Second round
1	(United States) I Lendl	6	6
Q	(Germany) J Renzenbrink	3	3
(Sweden) T Enqvist	7^{7}	6^{8}	7
8	(Germany) B Karbacher	6^{4}	7^{10}	5
(Australia) R Fromberg	7	6
Q	(Denmark) K Carlsen	5	3
(Netherlands) P Haarhuis	2	5
6	(Spain) C Costa	6	7

Quarterfinals
1	(United States) I Lendl	6	3	4
(Sweden) T Enqvist	4	6	6
(Australia) R Fromberg	5	6^{4}
6	(Spain) C Costa	7	7^{7}

Semifinals
(Sweden) T Enqvist	6	6
6	(Spain) C Costa	1	4

=== Bottom half ===
First round
5	(Spain) J Sánchez	7	6
WC	(Sweden) M Wilander	5	2
(France) R Gilbert	6	6^{6}	1
(Spain) F Clavet	1	7^{8}	6
(United States) B Shelton	3	2
(Spain) J Burillo	6	6
(New Zealand) B Steven	5	3
3	(Israel) A Mansdorf	7	1^{r}
7/WC	(Sweden) M Pernfors	3	7^{7}	7
(France) S Simian	6	6^{4}	5
(Sweden) N Kulti	6	6
Q	(South Africa) G Stafford	2	3
(United States) C Adams	6	2	2
(Sweden) M Larsson	4	6	6
(Australia) J Morgan	7^{7}	6^{6}	6^{4}
2	(Czech Republic) K Nováček	6^{5}	7^{8}	7^{7}

Second round
5	(Spain) J Sánchez	6	6
(Spain) F Clavet	4	3
(Spain) J Burillo	1	2
(New Zealand) B Steven	6	6
7	(Sweden) M Pernfors	6	7^{7}
(Sweden) N Kulti	3	6^{1}
(Sweden) M Larsson	3	4
2	(Czech Republic) K Nováček	6	6

Quarterfinals
5	(Spain) J Sánchez	3	2
(New Zealand) B Steven	6	6
7	(Sweden) M Pernfors	3	6^{4}
2	(Czech Republic) K Nováček	6	7^{7}

Semifinals
(New Zealand) B Steven	6	6
2	(Czech Republic) K Nováček	3	1
