= 1990 OTB International Open – Men's singles =

Men's singles
- 1990 OTB International Open

Final
- Champion: (India) Ramesh Krishnan
- Runner-up: (New Zealand) Kelly Evernden
- Score: 6–1, 6–1

Details
- Draw: 28 (3WC/4Q/1LL)
- Seeds: 8

Events
Singles	men	women
Doubles	men	women
- OTB Open

Simon Youl was the defending champion, but did not participate this year.

Ramesh Krishnan won the tournament, beating Kelly Evernden in the final, 6–1, 6–1.

== Seeds ==
The top four seeds received a bye into the second round.

1. (Argentina) Martín Jaite (semifinals)
2. (Israel) Amos Mansdorf (quarterfinals)
3. (Peru) Jaime Yzaga (second round)
4. (Argentina) Alberto Mancini (second round)
5. (Czechoslovakia) Milan Šrejber (second round)
6. (Finland) Aki Rahunen (first round)
7. (New Zealand) Kelly Evernden (final)
8. (United States) Derrick Rostagno (first round)

== Draw ==
Key

- Q = Qualifier
- WC = Wild card
- LL = Lucky loser
- Alt = Alternate
- ITF = ITF entry
- PR = Protected ranking
- SR = Special ranking
- SE = Special exempt
- JE = Junior exempt
- JR = Junior Accelerator Programme entrant
- CO = College Accelerator Programme entrant
- NG = Next Gen Accelerator Program entrant
- w/o = Walkover
- r = Retired
- d = Defaulted

=== Finals ===
Semifinals
1	(Argentina) Martín Jaite	6	3	5
(India) Ramesh Krishnan	1	6	7
(United States) Brad Pearce	2	6	4
7	(New Zealand) Kelly Evernden	6	3	6

Final
(India) Ramesh Krishnan	6	6
7	(New Zealand) Kelly Evernden	1	1

=== Top half ===
First round
(Australia) J Anderson	4	4
(France) F Santoro	6	6
(France) T Benhabiles	3	3
Q	(Soviet Union) A Olhovskiy	6	6
(Canada) G Connell	6
8	(United States) D Rostagno	4	r
LL	(United States) M Briggs	7	3	4
WC	(United States) C Adams	5	6	6
(India) R Krishnan	6	6
WC	(Czechoslovakia) J Kodeš Jr.	0	4
(France) T Champion	7	3	6
5	(Czechoslovakia) M Šrejber	5	6	7

Second round
1	(Argentina) M Jaite	7	7
(France) F Santoro	5	5
Q	(Soviet Union) A Olhovskiy	2	6	6
(Canada) G Connell	6	4	2
4	(Argentina) A Mancini	1	4
WC	(United States) C Adams	6	6
(India) R Krishnan	6	4	6
5	(Czechoslovakia) M Šrejber	3	6	4

Quarterfinals
1	(Argentina) M Jaite	4	7	6
Q	(Soviet Union) A Olhovskiy	6	5	4
WC	(United States) C Adams	3	1
(India) R Krishnan	6	6

Semifinals
1	(Argentina) M Jaite	6	3	5
(India) R Krishnan	1	6	7

=== Bottom half ===
First round
6	(Finland) A Rahunen	4	4
Q	(New Zealand) S Guy	6	6
Q	(France) G Raoux	1	4
(Czechoslovakia) M Střelba	6	6
(United States) B Pearce	6	7
(Sweden) T Högstedt	2	5
7	(New Zealand) K Evernden	6	4	6
Q	(United States) D Goldberg	4	6	2
WC	(Uruguay) D Montes de Oca	2	5
(United Kingdom) J Bates	6	7
(Australia) M Woodforde	6	7
(Germany) P Kühnen	1	6

Second round
Q	(New Zealand) S Guy	5	6	6
(Czechoslovakia) M Střelba	7	4	4
(United States) B Pearce	6	6
3	(Peru) J Yzaga	3	3
7	(New Zealand) K Evernden	5	7	7
(United Kingdom) J Bates	7	6	6
(Australia) M Woodforde	6	3
2	(Israel) A Mansdorf	7	6

Quarterfinals
Q	(New Zealand) S Guy	5	6^{3}
(United States) B Pearce	7	7^{7}
7	(New Zealand) K Evernden	7	7^{7}
2	(Israel) A Mansdorf	5	6^{5}

Semifinals
(United States) B Pearce	2	6	4
7	(New Zealand) K Evernden	6	3	6
