= 1991 OTB International Open – Men's singles =

Men's singles
- 1991 OTB International Open

Final
- Champion: (Germany) Michael Stich
- Runner-up: (Spain) Emilio Sánchez
- Score: 6–2, 6–4

Details
- Draw: 32 (1WC/4Q/2LL)
- Seeds: 8

Events
Singles	men	women
Doubles	men	women
- OTB Open

Ramesh Krishnan was the defending champion, but lost in the first round this year.

Michael Stich won the tournament, beating Emilio Sánchez in the final, 6–2, 6–4.

== Seeds ==
1. (Germany) Michael Stich (champion)
2. (Spain) Sergi Bruguera (quarterfinals)
3. (Spain) Emilio Sánchez (final)
4. (Soviet Union) Andrei Cherkasov (quarterfinals)
5. (Soviet Union) Alexander Volkov (quarterfinals)
6. (Austria) Horst Skoff (semifinals)
7. (Australia) Todd Woodbridge (quarterfinals)
8. (Spain) Francisco Clavet (semifinals)

== Draw ==
Key

- Q = Qualifier
- WC = Wild card
- LL = Lucky loser
- Alt = Alternate
- ITF = ITF entry
- PR = Protected ranking
- SR = Special ranking
- SE = Special exempt
- JE = Junior exempt
- JR = Junior Accelerator Programme entrant
- CO = College Accelerator Programme entrant
- NG = Next Gen Accelerator Program entrant
- w/o = Walkover
- r = Retired
- d = Defaulted

=== Finals ===
Semifinals
1	(Germany) Michael Stich	7	6
6	(Austria) Horst Skoff	5	1
3	(Spain) Emilio Sánchez	7	6
8	(Spain) Francisco Clavet	5	1

Final
1	(Germany) Michael Stich	6	6
3	(Spain) Emilio Sánchez	2	4

=== Top half ===
First round
1	(Germany) M Stich	7^{8}	6
(Australia) M Woodforde	6^{6}	3
(Spain) T Carbonell	4	6	7
(Germany) P Kühnen	6	3	5
WC	(Ecuador) A Gómez	6	6
(Netherlands) J Eltingh	4	0
(Sweden) C Bergström	1	2
7	(Australia) T Woodbridge	6	6
4	(Soviet Union) A Cherkasov	6	6
(United States) J Tarango	2	3
(Australia) R Fromberg	6	6
(United States) J Arias	4	3
(India) R Krishnan	3	4
Q	(United States) C Adams	6	6
(South Africa) W Ferreira	3	7^{7}	2
6	(Austria) H Skoff	6	6^{4}	6

Second round
1	(Germany) M Stich	6	6
(Spain) T Carbonell	1	2
WC	(Ecuador) A Gómez	7^{7}	4	5
7	(Australia) T Woodbridge	6^{4}	6	7
4	(Soviet Union) A Cherkasov	6	7
(Australia) R Fromberg	2	5
Q	(United States) C Adams	7	2	6^{3}
6	(Austria) H Skoff	5	6	7^{7}

Quarterfinals
1	(Germany) M Stich	6	6
7	(Australia) T Woodbridge	4	2
4	(Soviet Union) A Cherkasov	7^{10}	3	6^{2}
6	(Austria) H Skoff	6^{8}	6	7^{7}

Semifinals
1	(Germany) M Stich	7	6
6	(Austria) H Skoff	5	1

=== Bottom half ===
First round
5	(Soviet Union) A Volkov	6	6
(Soviet Union) D Poliakov	2	1
(France) C Pioline	2	4
(Spain) J Sánchez	6	6
(France) G Raoux	3	1^{d}
(Belgium) B Wuyts	6	2
LL	(South Africa) D Adams	4	4
3	(Spain) E Sánchez	6	6
8	(Spain) F Clavet	7	7^{7}
Q	(France) S Simian	5	6^{4}
Q	(The Bahamas) M Knowles	6	7^{7}
Q	(Venezuela) N Pereira	4	6^{5}
LL	(United States) Jason Netter	3	2
(Netherlands) P Haarhuis	6	6
(Australia) J Stoltenberg	6	2	3
2	(Spain) S Bruguera	4	6	6

Second round
5	(Soviet Union) A Volkov	0	7^{9}	7
(Spain) J Sánchez	6	6^{7}	5
(Belgium) B Wuyts	6^{5}	2
3	(Spain) E Sánchez	7^{7}	6
8	(Spain) F Clavet	6	6
Q	(The Bahamas) M Knowles	3	0
(Netherlands) P Haarhuis	4	6	5
2	(Spain) S Bruguera	6	3	7

Quarterfinals
5	(Soviet Union) A Volkov	1	5
3	(Spain) E Sánchez	6	7
8	(Spain) F Clavet	6	6
2	(Spain) S Bruguera	1	4

Semifinals
3	(Spain) E Sánchez	7	6
8	(Spain) F Clavet	5	1
