= Alfonso González (tennis) =

Mexican tennis player

- Country (sports): Mexico
- Born: Monterrey, Mexico

Singles
- Career record: 1–1
- Highest ranking: No. 229 (14 Oct 1985)

Grand Slam singles results
- Wimbledon: Q2 (1986)

Doubles
- Career record: 4–7
- Highest ranking: No. 220 (3 Jan 1983)

Grand Slam doubles results
- French Open: 2R (1982, 1983)

Alfonso González is a Mexican former professional tennis player.

Born in Monterrey, González was active on the professional tour during the 1980s and had a career high singles ranking of 229 in the world. He featured in the main draw of the French Open as a doubles player.

González, a Mexican national champion in 1983, represented his country in a 1984 Davis Cup tie against Venezuela in Caracas, playing two rubbers. His doubles win, partnering Fernando Pérez Pascal, secured the tie for Mexico and he then won a reverse singles over Iñaki Calvo.

Now a resident of Belgium, González is married to Belgian Federation Cup player Kathleen Schuurmans.

== See also ==
- List of Mexico Davis Cup team representatives
