= 1991 OTB International Open =

- Date: August 19–26
- Edition: 5th
- Category: ATP World Series; WTA Tier V
- Surface: Hard / outdoor
- Location: Schenectady, New York, U.S.

Champions

Men's singles
- (Germany) Michael Stich

Women's singles
- (Netherlands) Brenda Schultz

Men's doubles
- (Spain) Javier Sánchez / (Australia) Todd Woodbridge

Women's doubles
- (Australia) Rachel McQuillan / (Germany) Claudia Porwik
← 1990 ·	OTB International Open	· 1992 →

The 1991 OTB International Open was a combined men's and women's tennis tournament played on outdoor hard courts that was part of the World Series of the 1991 ATP Tour. It was the fifth edition of the tournament and was held in Schenectady, New York in the United States from August 19 through August 26, 1991. Michael Stich and Brenda Schultz won the singles titles.

== Finals ==
=== Men's singles ===
(Germany) Michael Stich defeated (Spain) Emilio Sánchez 6–2, 6–4

- It was Stich's 4th title of the year and the 9th of his career.

=== Women's singles ===
(Netherlands) Brenda Schultz defeated (France) Alexia Dechaume 7–6^{(7–5)}, 6–2

- It was Schultz' 1st singles title of her career.

=== Men's doubles ===
(Spain) Javier Sánchez / (Australia) Todd Woodbridge defeated (Ecuador) Andrés Gómez / (Spain) Emilio Sánchez 3–6, 7–6, 7–6

- It was Sánchez's 3rd title of the year and the 16th of his career. It was Woodbridge's 5th title of the year and the 7th of his career.

=== Women's doubles ===
(Australia) Rachel McQuillan / (Germany) Claudia Porwik defeated (United States) Nicole Arendt / (United States) Shannan McCarthy 6–2, 6–4
