= Cologne Open =

Tennis tournament in Germany

Tournament information
- Founded: 1992 (men)
- Editions: 1
- Location: Cologne, Germany
- Surface: Clay / outdoor

The Cologne Open is a defunct men's tennis tournament that was part of the ATP World Series of the ATP Tour for one year in 1992. The event was held in Cologne, Germany, from 14 September until 20 September 1992 and was played on outdoor clay courts. The prize money for the tournament was $300,000. Bernd Karbacher won the singles event while Horacio de la Peña and Gustavo Luza teamed-up to win the doubles event.

== Finals ==
=== Men's singles ===
Year	Champion	Runner-up	Score
1992	(Germany) Bernd Karbacher	(South Africa) Marcos Ondruska	7–6^{(7–4)}, 6–4

=== Men's doubles ===
Year	Champion	Runner-up	Score
1992	(Argentina) Horacio de la Peña (Argentina) Gustavo Luza	(Sweden) Ronnie Båthman (Czechoslovakia) Libor Pimek	6–7, 6–0, 6–2

== See also ==
- Cologne Grand Prix
- 2020 Bett1Hulks Indoors
- 2020 Bett1Hulks Championship
