= 1994 OTB International Open – Women's singles =

Women's singles
- 1994 OTB International Open

Final
- Champion: (Austria) Judith Wiesner
- Runner-up: (Latvia) Larisa Neiland
- Score: 7–5, 3–6, 6–4

Details
- Draw: 32 (2WC/4Q)
- Seeds: 8

Events
Singles	men	women
Doubles	men	women
- OTB Open

Larisa Neiland was the defending champion, but lost in the final to Judith Wiesner. The score was 7–5, 3–6, 6–4.

== Seeds ==
1. (South Africa) Amanda Coetzer (semifinals)
2. (Germany) Sabine Hack (first round)
3. (France) Julie Halard (second round)
4. (France) Nathalie Tauziat (semifinals)
5. (United States) Meredith McGrath (first round)
6. (Chinese Taipei) Wang Shi-ting (quarterfinals)
7. (Georgia (country)) Leila Meskhi (first round)
8. (Austria) Judith Wiesner (champion)

== Draw ==
Key

- Q = Qualifier
- WC = Wild card
- LL = Lucky loser
- Alt = Alternate
- ITF = ITF entry
- PR = Protected ranking
- SR = Special ranking
- SE = Special exempt
- JE = Junior exempt
- JR = Junior Accelerator Programme entrant
- CO = College Accelerator Programme entrant
- NG = Next Gen Accelerator Program entrant
- w/o = Walkover
- r = Retired
- d = Defaulted

=== Finals ===
Semifinals
1	(South Africa) Amanda Coetzer	3	4
(Latvia) Larisa Neiland	6	6
4	(France) Nathalie Tauziat	6	3	3
8	(Austria) Judith Wiesner	4	6	6

Final
(Latvia) Larisa Neiland	5	6	4
8	(Austria) Judith Wiesner	7	3	6

=== Top half ===
First round
1	(South Africa) A Coetzer	6	6
Q	(Belgium) L Courtois	1	3
(Italy) L Ferrando	1	2
(South Africa) E Reinach	6	6
(United States) D Graham	7^{7}	2	6
Q	(Russia) E Maniokova	6^{3}	6	1
(Australia) R McQuillan	1	6	2
6	(Chinese Taipei) S-t Wang	6	2	6
3	(France) J Halard	4	6	7
(United States) P Shriver	6	4	5
(Latvia) L Neiland	4	6	6
(Sweden) Å Carlsson	6	1	3
(Ukraine) N Medvedeva	5	6	6
Q	(France) N Herreman	7	2	1
(United States) S Stafford	6	6
7	(Georgia (country)) L Meskhi	4	4

Second round
1	(South Africa) A Coetzer	6	3	6
(South Africa) E Reinach	3	6	3
(United States) D Graham	1	1
6	(Chinese Taipei) S-t Wang	6	6
3	(France) J Halard	7^{7}	6^{5}	4
(Latvia) L Neiland	6^{2}	7^{7}	6
(Ukraine) N Medvedeva	3	6	7
(United States) S Stafford	6	1	5

Quarterfinals
1	(South Africa) A Coetzer	6^{4}	6	6
6	(Chinese Taipei) S-t Wang	7^{7}	3	3
(Latvia) L Neiland	3	7	7
(Ukraine) N Medvedeva	6	5	5

Semifinals
1	(South Africa) A Coetzer	3	4
(Latvia) L Neiland	6	6

=== Bottom half ===
First round
5	(United States) M McGrath	3	5
(United States) M Werdel	6	7
(Netherlands) K Boogert	6	4	2
(Netherlands) S Rottier	4	6	6
(United States) G Helgeson	0	4
(Russia) E Makarova	6	6
(United States) L Harvey Wild	1	4
4	(France) N Tauziat	6	6
8	(Austria) J Wiesner	6	6
(Slovakia) K Habšudová	3	1
WC	(United States) A Lettiere	2	2
Q	(Japan) Y Kamio	6	6
(Netherlands) M Oremans	5	7^{7}	6
WC	(Spain) M Sánchez Lorenzo	7	6^{4}	3
(Germany) B Rittner	6	7
2	(Germany) S Hack	4	5

Second round
(United States) M Werdel	2	7	5
(Netherlands) S Rottier	6	5	7
(Russia) E Makarova	3	4
4	(France) N Tauziat	6	6
8	(Austria) J Wiesner	6	6
Q	(Japan) Y Kamio	3	1
(Netherlands) M Oremans	2	3
(Germany) B Rittner	6	6

Quarterfinals
(Netherlands) S Rottier	3	1
4	(France) N Tauziat	6	6
8	(Austria) J Wiesner	7^{9}	6
(Germany) B Rittner	6^{7}	1

Semifinals
4	(France) N Tauziat	6	3	3
8	(Austria) J Wiesner	4	6	6
