= 1994 OTB International Open – Women's doubles =

Women's doubles
- 1994 OTB International Open

Final
- Champions: (United States) Meredith McGrath (Latvia) Larisa Neiland
- Runners-up: (United States) Pam Shriver (Australia) Elizabeth Smylie
- Score: 6–2, 6–2

Details
- Draw: 16 (1WC/1Q)
- Seeds: 4

Events
Singles	men	women
Doubles	men	women
- OTB Open

Rachel McQuillan and Claudia Porwik were the defending champions, but Porwik did not compete this year. McQuillan teamed up with Miriam Oremans and lost in the quarterfinals to Meredith McGrath and Larisa Neiland.

McGrath and Neiland won the title by defeating Pam Shriver and Elizabeth Smylie 6–2, 6–2 in the final.

== Seeds ==
1. (United States) Meredith McGrath / (Latvia) Larisa Neiland (champions)
2. (United States) Pam Shriver / (United States) Elizabeth Smylie (final)
3. (France) Julie Halard / (France) Nathalie Tauziat (semifinals)
4. (United States) Debbie Graham / (Ukraine) Natalia Medvedeva (semifinals)

== Draw ==
Key

- Q = Qualifier
- WC = Wild card
- LL = Lucky loser
- Alt = Alternate
- ITF = ITF entry
- PR = Protected ranking
- SR = Special ranking
- SE = Special exempt
- JE = Junior exempt
- JR = Junior Accelerator Programme entrant
- CO = College Accelerator Programme entrant
- NG = Next Gen Accelerator Program entrant
- w/o = Walkover
- r = Retired
- d = Defaulted

=== Draw ===
First round
1	(United States) M McGrath (Latvia) L Neiland	6	4	6
(Australia) N Bradtke (South Africa) E Reinach	2	6	2
(Slovakia) K Habšudová (Germany) B Rittner	3	4
(Australia) R McQuillan (Netherlands) M Oremans	6	6
3	(France) J Halard (France) N Tauziat	6	6
(Kazakhstan) E Likhovtseva (Russia) E Makarova	4	2
(France) A Dechaume-Balleret (Argentina) F Labat	6	6
(Netherlands) I Driehuis (Croatia) M Murić	4	4
Q	(United States) J Steven (United States) M Werdel	6^{2}	1
(Japan) Y Kamio (Japan) K Nagatsuka	7^{7}	6
(Sweden) Å Carlsson (Belgium) L Courtois	3	2
4	(United States) D Graham (Ukraine) N Medvedeva	6	6
WC	(Italy) L Ferrando (Germany) S Hack	5	1
(Russia) E Maniokova (Georgia (country)) L Meskhi	7	6
(United States) S Collins (United States) B Nagelsen	6	5	2
2	(United States) P Shriver (Australia) E Smylie	3	7	6

Quarterfinals
1	(United States) M McGrath (Latvia) L Neiland	6	6
(Australia) R McQuillan (Netherlands) M Oremans	3	2
3	(France) J Halard (France) N Tauziat	6	6
(France) A Dechaume-Balleret (Argentina) F Labat	1	3
(Japan) Y Kamio (Japan) K Nagatsuka	3	1
4	(United States) D Graham (Ukraine) N Medvedeva	6	6
(Russia) E Maniokova (Georgia (country)) L Meskhi	5	6	4
2	(United States) P Shriver (Australia) E Smylie	7	2	6

Semifinals
1	(United States) M McGrath (Latvia) L Neiland	6	6
3	(France) J Halard (France) N Tauziat	3	2
4	(United States) D Graham (Ukraine) N Medvedeva	3	3
2	(United States) P Shriver (Australia) E Smylie	6	6

Final
1	(United States) M McGrath (Latvia) L Neiland	6	6
2	(United States) P Shriver (Australia) E Smylie	2	2
