= María Luciana Reynares =

Argentine tennis player

- Country (sports): Argentina
- Born: 9 February 1976 (age 49) Rosario, Argentina
- Prize money: $28,471

Singles
- Highest ranking: No. 157 (26 October 1992)

Grand Slam singles results
- French Open: 1R (1992)

María Luciana Reynares (born 9 February 1976) is an Argentine former professional tennis player.

Reynares reached a best ranking of No. 156 in the world, while competing on the professional tour as a teenager in the early 1990s. She made her WTA Tour main draw debut at the 1990 Schenectady Open and won four ITF titles in 1991. Her biggest achievement then came in 1992 when she qualified for the 1992 French Open, where she was narrowly defeated in the first round by Finland's Petra Thorén, 6–8 in the third set.

== ITF finals ==
$25,000 tournaments
$10,000 tournaments

=== Singles: 8 (4–4) ===
Result	No.	Date	Tournament	Surface	Opponent	Score
Win	1.	14 January 1991	Mission, United States	Hard	(United States) Chanda Rubin	6–0, 6–2
Loss	1.	21 January 1991	New Braunfels, United States	Hard	(United States) Katrina Adams	6–7^{(7)}, 6–2, 2–6
Loss	2.	9 September 1991	Guayaquil, Ecuador	Clay	(Chile) Paula Cabezas	1–6, 7–6^{(6)}, 1–6
Win	2.	16 September 1991	Bogotá, Colombia	Clay	(Chile) Macarena Miranda	6–4, 6–4
Loss	3.	7 October 1991	Santiago, Chile	Clay	(Chile) Paula Cabezas	5–7, 3–6
Loss	4.	14 October 1991	Buenos Aires, Argentina	Clay	(Argentina) Paola Suárez	6–2, 6–7, 1–6
Win	3.	21 October 1991	Asunción, Paraguay	Clay	(Argentina) Maria Jose Gaidano	6–3, 6–1
Win	4.	25 November 1991	Porto Alegre, Brazil	Clay	(Spain) Neus Ávila	6–1, 6–3
