= 1993 OTB International Open – Men's doubles =

Men's doubles
- 1993 OTB International Open

Final
- Champions: (Germany) Bernd Karbacher (Russia) Andrei Olhovskiy
- Runners-up: (Zimbabwe) Byron Black (New Zealand) Brett Steven
- Score: 2–6, 7–6, 6–1

Details
- Draw: 16
- Seeds: 4

Events
Singles	men	women
Doubles	men	women
- OTB International Open

Jacco Eltingh and Paul Haarhuis were the defending champions, but lost in the first round this year.

Bernd Karbacher and Andrei Olhovskiy won the title, defeating Byron Black and Brett Steven 2–6, 7–6, 6–1 in the final.

== Seeds ==
1. (Netherlands) Jacco Eltingh / (Netherlands) Paul Haarhuis (first round)
2. (Spain) Sergio Casal / (Spain) Emilio Sánchez (semifinals)
3. (Czech Republic) Karel Nováček / (Spain) Javier Sánchez (quarterfinals)
4. (Zimbabwe) Byron Black / (New Zealand) Brett Steven (final)

== Draw ==
Key

- Q = Qualifier
- WC = Wild card
- LL = Lucky loser
- Alt = Alternate
- ITF = ITF entry
- PR = Protected ranking
- SR = Special ranking
- SE = Special exempt
- JE = Junior exempt
- JR = Junior Accelerator Programme entrant
- CO = College Accelerator Programme entrant
- NG = Next Gen Accelerator Program entrant
- w/o = Walkover
- r = Retired
- d = Defaulted

=== Draw ===
First round
1	(Netherlands) J Eltingh (Netherlands) P Haarhuis	6	6
(Malaysia) A Malik (United States) F Montana	7	7
WC	(United States) R Blake (United States) Barry Ruback	2	5
(Germany) B Karbacher (Russia) A Olhovskiy	6	7
3	(Czech Republic) K Nováček (Spain) J Sánchez	6	6	6
(United States) R Benson (United States) R Schmidt	4	7	3
(South Africa) J de Beer (France) S Simian	6	6
Q	(Australia) R Fromberg (Australia) J Morgan	4	1
(South Africa) E Ferreira (South Africa) G Stafford	6	3	6
(Sweden) R Båthman (Norway) B-O Pedersen	1	6	3
(Sweden) J Donar (Sweden) O Jonsson	3	6	4
4	(Zimbabwe) B Black (New Zealand) B Steven	6	3	6
(Spain) J Burillo (Brazil) J Oncins	6	3
(United States) D Rostagno (United States) B Shelton	7	6
WC	(Sweden) M Pernfors (Sweden) M Wilander	6	2	6
2	(Spain) S Casal (Spain) E Sánchez	4	6	7

Quarterfinals
(Malaysia) A Malik (United States) F Montana	3	5
(Germany) B Karbacher (Russia) A Olhovskiy	6	7
3	(Czech Republic) K Nováček (Spain) J Sánchez	3	7	3
(South Africa) J de Beer (France) S Simian	6	6	6
(South Africa) E Ferreira (South Africa) G Stafford	6	2	6
4	(Zimbabwe) B Black (New Zealand) B Steven	4	6	7
(United States) D Rostagno (United States) B Shelton	3	3
2	(Spain) S Casal (Spain) E Sánchez	6	6

Semifinals
(Germany) B Karbacher (Russia) A Olhovskiy	3	6	6
(South Africa) J de Beer (France) S Simian	6	4	3
4	(Zimbabwe) B Black (New Zealand) B Steven	6	6
2	(Spain) S Casal (Spain) E Sánchez	4	4

Final
(Germany) B Karbacher (Russia) A Olhovskiy	2	7	6
4	(Zimbabwe) B Black (New Zealand) B Steven	6	6	1
