= Paul Koscielski =

American tennis player

- Country (sports): United States
- Born: February 1, 1966 (age 59); South Bend, Indiana, U.S.
- Height: 5 ft 11 in (180 cm)
- Prize money: $19,550

Singles
- Highest ranking: No. 254 (October 30, 1989)

Grand Slam singles results
- Australian Open: Q2 (1993)
- Wimbledon: Q2 (1986)

Doubles
- Career record: 0–2
- Highest ranking: No. 262 (February 18, 1991)

Paul Koscielski (born February 1, 1966) is an American former professional tennis player.

Koscielski grew up in South Bend, Indiana, where he attended John Adams High School. He played college tennis at the University of Texas as team captain and number one singles player, graduating in 1988.

On the professional tour he reached a best singles ranking of 254 in the world. He won a Challenger title at Johannesburg in 1989, defeating Wayne Ferreira in the final. His two ATP Tour main draw appearances both came in the doubles at the Schenectady Open.

== Challenger titles ==
=== Singles: (1) ===
Year	Tournament	Surface	Opponent	Score
1989	Johannesburg, South Africa	Grass	(South Africa) Wayne Ferreira	6–3, 6–3
