= Doug Eisenman =

American tennis player (born 1968)

- Full name: Doug Eisenman
- Country (sports): United States
- Born: October 2, 1968 (age 57) Los Angeles, California, U.S.
- Plays: Left-handed
- Prize money: $93,466

Singles
- Highest ranking: No. 371 (December 23, 1991)

Doubles
- Career record: 17–41
- Career titles: 0
- Highest ranking: No. 102 (November 16, 1992)

Grand Slam doubles results
- Australian Open: 1R (1993)
- Wimbledon: 2R (1992)
- US Open: 3R (1993)

Doug Eisenman (born October 2, 1968) is a former professional tennis player from the United States.

== Biography ==
Eisenman, a doubles specialist, comes from Santa Ana, California. He attended Foothill High School, where in 1986 he was Los Angeles Times First Team All-County.

He teamed up with Dan Turbow to win the doubles title at the 1986 National Junior Hardcourts Championships. Between 1987 and 1990 he attended UC Berkeley. He won the NCAA Division I doubles title with Matt Lucena in 1990, along with the Collegiate Championships and National Indoor Championships.

He competed in the 1989 Maccabiah Games in Israel.

In 1990, after graduation, Eisenman turned professional and competed on the Challenger and ATP Tour circuits. He made the semi-finals at São Paulo in 1992 with Royce Deppe and further semi-finals in both Prague and Umag in 1993, with Donald Johnson. All three of his Challenger titles came in 1992. At Grand Slam level he featured in the men's doubles draws at the Australian Open, Wimbledon and US Open. He reached the second round of the 1992 Wimbledon Championships with Mark Knowles. His best performance came at the 1993 US Open. As wildcards, Eisenman and partner Donald Johnson made the third round, a run which included a win over eighth seeds Sergio Casal and Emilio Sánchez.

== Challenger titles ==
=== Doubles: (3) ===
Year	Tournament	Surface	Partner	Opponents	Score
1992	Heilbronn, Germany	Carpet	(Norway) Bent-Ove Pedersen	(Netherlands) Sander Groen (Sweden) Tomas Nydahl	6–1, 6–3
1992	Porto, Portugal	Clay	(Norway) Bent-Ove Pedersen	(Spain) Jordi Arrese (Spain) Àlex Corretja	1–6, 6–4, 6–2
1992	Caracas, Venezuela	Hard	(United States) Tom Mercer	(United States) Brian Joelson (United States) Ted Scherman	3–6, 6–3, 7–5
