= Brett Steven =

New Zealand tennis player (born 1969)

- Country (sports): New Zealand
- Residence: Auckland, New Zealand
- Born: 27 April 1969 (age 56) Auckland, New Zealand
- Height: 1.85 m (6 ft 1 in)
- Turned pro: 1988
- Retired: 1999
- Plays: Right-handed (one-handed backhand)
- Prize money: $2,439,714

Singles
- Career record: 175–166
- Career titles: 0
- Highest ranking: No. 32 (12 February 1996)

Grand Slam singles results
- Australian Open: QF (1993)
- French Open: 3R (1995)
- Wimbledon: 4R (1997)
- US Open: 2R (1995, 1997)

Other tournaments
- Grand Slam Cup: QF (1993)
- Olympic Games: 1R (1996)

Doubles
- Career record: 179–116
- Career titles: 9
- Highest ranking: No. 16 (12 June 1995)

Grand Slam doubles results
- Australian Open: QF (1998)
- French Open: SF (1995)
- Wimbledon: QF (1994, 1998)
- US Open: 3R (1994)

Grand Slam mixed doubles results
- Wimbledon: 3R (1995)

Brett Andrew Steven (born 27 April 1969) is a former New Zealand tennis player.

== Biography ==
Steven began his tennis career at the age of 10 as a ball boy and by the age of 16 he participated at his first tournament. He attended Mount Roskill Grammar School.

Steven turned professional in 1988 and won his first tour doubles title in 1991 at Newport, Rhode Island.

Steven's best singles performance at a Grand Slam event came at the 1993 Australian Open, where he reached the quarterfinals, defeating Dave Randall, Thomas Muster, Andrei Olhovskiy and Richard Fromberg before being knocked out by Pete Sampras. At Masters level, he reached the quarterfinals of the 1993 Canada Masters and the 1998 Rome Masters.

Steven represented New Zealand at the 1996 Summer Olympics in Atlanta, where he lost in the first round to Arnaud Boetsch of France.

Steven won nine top-level doubles titles during his career, the most significant of which was the Indian Wells Masters, which he won in 1995 (partnering Tommy Ho). Though he did not win any top-level singles titles during his career, Steven was a singles runner-up at three tour events (Schenectady in 1993, Auckland in 1996 and Newport in 1997). His career-high rankings were World No. 32 in singles and No. 16 in doubles. His career prize-money totalled US$2,439,714. Steven retired from the professional tour in 1999.

== Junior Grand Slam finals ==
=== Doubles: 1 (1 runner-up) ===
| Result | Year | Tournament | Surface | Partner | Opponents | Score |
|---|---|---|---|---|---|---|
| Loss | 1987 | US Open | Hard | (India) Zeeshan Ali | (Croatia) Goran Ivanišević (Italy) Diego Nargiso | 6–3, 4–6, 3–6 |

== ATP career finals ==
=== Singles: 3 (3 runner-ups) ===
| Legend Grand Slam Tournaments (0–0) ATP World Tour Finals (0–0) ATP World Tour Masters Series (0–0) ATP Championship Series (0–0) ATP World Series (0–3) | Finals by surface Hard (0–2) Clay (0–0) Grass (0–1) Carpet (0–0) | Finals by setting Outdoors (0–3) Indoors (0–0) |

| Result | W–L | Date | Tournament | Tier | Surface | Opponent | Score |
|---|---|---|---|---|---|---|---|
| Loss | 0–1 | Aug 1993 | Schenectady, United States | World Series | Hard | (Sweden) Thomas Enqvist | 6–4, 3–6, 6–7^{(0–7)} |
| Loss | 0–2 | Jan 1996 | Auckland, New Zealand | World Series | Hard | (Czech Republic) Jiří Novák | 4–6, 4–6 |
| Loss | 0–3 | Jul 1997 | Newport, United States | World Series | Grass | (Armenia) Sargis Sargsian | 6–7^{(0–7)}, 6–4, 5–7 |

=== Doubles: 17 (9 title, 8 runner-ups) ===
| Legend Grand Slam Tournaments (0–0) ATP World Tour Finals (0–0) ATP Masters Series (1–1) ATP Championship Series (0–1) ATP World Series (8–6) | Finals by surface Hard (3–4) Clay (1–2) Grass (2–0) Carpet (3–2) | Finals by setting Outdoors (7–5) Indoors (2–3) |

| Result | W–L | Date | Tournament | Tier | Surface | Partner | Opponents | Score |
|---|---|---|---|---|---|---|---|---|
| Win | 1–0 | Jul 1991 | Newport, United States | World Series | Grass | (Italy) Gianluca Pozzi | (Argentina) Javier Frana (United States) Bruce Steel | 6–4, 6–4 |
| Loss | 1–1 | Aug 1993 | Schenectady, United States | World Series | Hard | (Zimbabwe) Byron Black | (Germany) Bernd Karbacher (Russia) Andrei Olhovskiy | 6–2, 6–7, 1–6 |
| Win | 2–1 | Mar 1994 | Copenhagen, Denmark | World Series | Carpet | (Czech Republic) Martin Damm | (Germany) David Prinosil (Germany) Udo Riglewski | 6–3, 6–4 |
| Win | 3–1 | Apr 1994 | Hong Kong, Hong Kong | World Series | Hard | (United States) Jim Grabb | (Sweden) Jonas Björkman (Australia) Patrick Rafter | walkover |
| Win | 4–1 | May 1994 | Coral Springs, United States | World Series | Clay | (South Africa) Lan Bale | (United States) Ken Flach (France) Stéphane Simian | 6–3, 7–5 |
| Loss | 4–2 | Feb 1995 | Memphis, United States | Championship Series | Hard | (United States) Tommy Ho | (United States) Jared Palmer (United States) Richey Reneberg | 6–4, 6–7, 1–6 |
| Win | 5–2 | Mar 1995 | Indian Wells, United States | Masters Series | Hard | (United States) Tommy Ho | (South Africa) Pieter Norval (South Africa) Gary Muller | 6–4, 7–6 |
| Loss | 5–3 | Apr 1995 | Paget, Bermuda | World Series | Clay | (Australia) Jason Stoltenberg | (Canada) Grant Connell (United States) Todd Martin | 6–7, 6–2, 5–7 |
| Loss | 5–4 | Nov 1995 | Moscow, Russia | World Series | Carpet | (United States) Tommy Ho | (United States) Jared Palmer (Zimbabwe) Byron Black | 4–6, 6–3, 3–6 |
| Loss | 5–5 | Jan 1996 | Auckland, New Zealand | World Series | Hard | (Sweden) Jonas Björkman | (South Africa) Marcos Ondruska (United States) Jack Waite | walkover |
| Loss | 5–6 | Mar 1996 | Scottsdale, United States | World Series | Hard | (United States) Richey Reneberg | (United States) Patrick Galbraith (United States) Rick Leach | 7–5, 5–7, 5–7 |
| Win | 6–6 | Mar 1997 | Copenhagen, Denmark | World Series | Carpet | (Russia) Andrei Olhovskiy | (Denmark) Kenneth Carlsen (Denmark) Frederik Fetterlein | 6–4, 6–2 |
| Win | 7–6 | Mar 1997 | St. Petersburg, Russia | World Series | Carpet | (Russia) Andrei Olhovskiy | (Germany) David Prinosil (Czech Republic) Daniel Vacek | 6–4, 6–3 |
| Win | 8–6 | Jul 1997 | Newport, United States | World Series | Grass | (United States) Justin Gimelstob | (United States) Kent Kinnear (North Macedonia) Aleksandar Kitinov | 6–3, 6–4 |
| Win | 9–6 | Jan 1998 | Auckland, New Zealand | World Series | Hard | (United States) Patrick Galbraith | (Netherlands) Tom Nijssen (United States) Jeff Tarango | 6–4, 6–2 |
| Loss | 9–7 | Mar 1998 | Copenhagen, Denmark | World Series | Carpet | (Netherlands) Jan Siemerink | (Netherlands) Tom Kempers (Netherlands) Menno Oosting | 4–6, 6–7 |
| Loss | 9–8 | May 1998 | Hamburg, Germany | Masters Series | Clay | (South Africa) David Adams | (United States) Donald Johnson (United States) Francisco Montana | 2–6, 5–7 |

== ATP Challenger and ITF Futures finals ==
=== Singles: 6 (3–3) ===
| Legend ATP Challenger (3–3) ITF Futures (0–0) | Finals by surface Hard (1–2) Clay (1–0) Grass (0–0) Carpet (1–1) |

| Result | W–L | Date | Tournament | Tier | Surface | Opponent | Score |
|---|---|---|---|---|---|---|---|
| Win | 1–0 | Sep 1990 | Canberra, Australia | Challenger | Carpet | (Australia) Andrew Kratzmann | 6–3, 6 4 |
| Loss | 1–1 | Aug 1992 | New Haven, United States | Challenger | Hard | (United States) Jimmy Arias | 6–7, 2–6 |
| Loss | 1–2 | Nov 1992 | Aachen, Germany | Challenger | Carpet | (Czech Republic) Martin Damm | 4–6, 6–7 |
| Win | 2–2 | Jan 1995 | Wellington, New Zealand | Challenger | Hard | (Czech Republic) Martin Damm | 6–3, 6 3 |
| Win | 3–2 | May 1997 | Ljubljana, Slovenia | Challenger | Clay | (Romania) Andrei Pavel | 7–6, 6 2 |
| Loss | 3–3 | Aug 1999 | Binghamton, United States | Challenger | Hard | (France) Antony Dupuis | 7–6, 1–6, 4–6 |

=== Doubles: 2 (0–2) ===
| Legend ATP Challenger (0–2) ITF Futures (0–0) | Finals by surface Hard (0–0) Clay (0–1) Grass (0–0) Carpet (0–1) |

| Result | W–L | Date | Tournament | Tier | Surface | Partner | Opponents | Score |
|---|---|---|---|---|---|---|---|---|
| Loss | 0–1 | Nov 1990 | Hobart, Australia | Challenger | Carpet | (Australia) Sandon Stolle | (Australia) Brett Custer (Australia) David Macpherson | 2–6, 7–6, 4–6 |
| Loss | 0–2 | Jun 1992 | Halle, Germany | Challenger | Clay | (New Zealand) Kelly Evernden | (Germany) Karsten Braasch (Germany) Lars Koslowski | 6–4, 6–7, 0–6 |

== Performance timelines ==
Key
| W | F | SF | QF | #R | RR | Q# | DNQ | A | NH |

(W) winner; (F) finalist; (SF) semifinalist; (QF) quarterfinalist; (#R) rounds 4, 3, 2, 1; (RR) round-robin stage; (Q#) qualification round; (DNQ) did not qualify; (A) absent; (NH) not held; (SR) strike rate (events won / competed); (W–L) win–loss record.

=== Singles ===
| Tournament | 1987 | 1988 | 1989 | 1990 | 1991 | 1992 | 1993 | 1994 | 1995 | 1996 | 1997 | 1998 | 1999 | SR | W–L | Win % |
|---|---|---|---|---|---|---|---|---|---|---|---|---|---|---|---|---|
Grand Slam tournaments
| Australian Open | A | A | A | A | Q1 | A | QF | 2R | 2R | 4R | 1R | 1R | 1R | 0 / 7 | 9–7 | 56% |
| French Open | A | A | A | A | A | A | 2R | 1R | 3R | 2R | Q1 | 1R | A | 0 / 5 | 4–5 | 44% |
| Wimbledon | Q1 | A | A | A | Q2 | A | 2R | 2R | 3R | 3R | 4R | 1R | A | 0 / 6 | 9–6 | 60% |
| US Open | A | A | A | A | A | Q3 | 1R | 1R | 2R | A | 2R | 1R | Q2 | 0 / 5 | 2–5 | 29% |
| Win–loss | 0–0 | 0–0 | 0–0 | 0–0 | 0–0 | 0–0 | 6–4 | 2–4 | 6–4 | 6–3 | 4–3 | 0–4 | 0–1 | 0 / 23 | 24–23 | 51% |
Olympic Games
| Summer Olympics | NH | A | Not Held | | | A | Not Held | | | 1R | Not Held | | | 0 / 1 | 0–1 | 0% |
ATP Masters Series
| Indian Wells | A | A | A | A | A | A | A | A | A | 1R | A | A | A | 0 / 1 | 0–1 | 0% |
| Miami | A | A | A | A | A | A | 2R | 1R | 1R | A | A | A | A | 0 / 3 | 1–3 | 25% |
| Monte Carlo | A | A | A | A | A | A | A | A | A | A | A | 1R | A | 0 / 1 | 0–1 | 0% |
| Hamburg | A | A | A | A | A | A | A | A | A | A | A | 1R | A | 0 / 1 | 0–1 | 0% |
| Rome | A | A | A | A | A | A | A | A | A | A | A | QF | A | 0 / 1 | 3–1 | 75% |
| Canada | A | A | A | A | A | A | QF | 2R | 3R | A | 2R | A | A | 0 / 4 | 7–4 | 64% |
| Cincinnati | A | A | A | A | A | A | 1R | 1R | 3R | A | 1R | A | A | 0 / 4 | 2–4 | 33% |
| Paris | A | A | A | A | A | A | 1R | A | 1R | A | A | A | A | 0 / 2 | 0–2 | 0% |
| Win–loss | 0–0 | 0–0 | 0–0 | 0–0 | 0–0 | 0–0 | 4–4 | 1–3 | 4–4 | 0–1 | 1–2 | 3–3 | 0–0 | 0 / 17 | 13–17 | 43% |

=== Doubles ===
| Tournament | 1991 | 1992 | 1993 | 1994 | 1995 | 1996 | 1997 | 1998 | SR | W–L | Win % |
|---|---|---|---|---|---|---|---|---|---|---|---|
Grand Slam tournaments
| Australian Open | A | A | 1R | 1R | 2R | 3R | 2R | QF | 0 / 6 | 7–6 | 54% |
| French Open | A | A | 2R | 3R | SF | 1R | A | QF | 0 / 5 | 10–5 | 67% |
| Wimbledon | Q1 | A | 1R | QF | 2R | 1R | 2R | QF | 0 / 6 | 8–6 | 57% |
| US Open | A | 2R | 2R | 3R | A | A | 1R | 1R | 0 / 5 | 4–5 | 44% |
| Win–loss | 0–0 | 1–1 | 2–4 | 7–4 | 6–3 | 2–3 | 2–3 | 9–4 | 0 / 22 | 29–22 | 57% |
Year-end Championships
| ATP Finals | Did not qualify | | | | RR | DNQ | | | 0 / 1 | 1–2 | 33% |
ATP Masters Series
| Indian Wells | A | A | A | A | W | 1R | A | A | 1 / 2 | 5–1 | 83% |
| Miami | A | A | Q2 | 3R | 3R | A | A | A | 0 / 2 | 3–2 | 60% |
| Hamburg | A | A | A | A | A | A | A | F | 0 / 1 | 4–1 | 80% |
| Rome | A | A | A | A | A | A | A | QF | 0 / 1 | 2–1 | 67% |
| Canada | A | A | 1R | QF | 1R | A | A | A | 0 / 3 | 2–3 | 40% |
| Cincinnati | A | A | A | 2R | 2R | A | 1R | A | 0 / 3 | 2–3 | 40% |
| Paris | A | A | A | A | 2R | A | A | A | 0 / 1 | 1–1 | 50% |
| Win–loss | 0–0 | 0–0 | 0–1 | 5–3 | 8–4 | 0–1 | 0–1 | 6–2 | 1 / 13 | 19–12 | 61% |
