= Alysia May =

American tennis player (born 1971)

- Full name: Alysia May
- Country (sports): United States
- Born: January 31, 1971 (age 55)
- Prize money: $65,313

Singles
- Career record: 40–46
- Highest ranking: No. 160 (January 27, 1992)

Doubles
- Career record: 46–39
- Career titles: 1 WTA
- Highest ranking: No. 58 (August 12, 1991)

Grand Slam doubles results
- Australian Open: 1R (1991)
- French Open: 2R (1992)
- Wimbledon: 2R (1991)
- US Open: 1R (1991)

Alysia May (born January 31, 1971) is a former professional tennis player from the United States.

== Biography ==
May, who grew up in California, is the daughter of the late David May II, who was an heir to the May Department Stores Co retail giant. The company, acquired by Macy's in 2005, was founded by Alysia's great grandfather, German born businessman David May. Her maternal step-grandfather was Hollywood director Mervyn LeRoy. She is a younger sister of tennis player Kathy May and has another sister Anita, as well as four half-sisters and two adopted brothers. She is also the aunt of ATP pro Taylor Fritz.

After attending Westlake High School in Los Angeles, May was recruited by the UCLA Bruins to play collegiate tennis, then in 1990 turned professional.

In the early 1990s she competed on the professional tour, most prominently as a doubles player, reaching a top ranking of 58 in the world. She featured in the main draw of the women's doubles at all four grand slam tournaments and won one WTA title, at Schenectady in 1990 partnering Nana Miyagi. As a singles player she was ranked as high as 160. At the 1991 Tokyo Indoor she won a match against Marianne Werdel.

== WTA Tour finals ==
=== Doubles (1-0) ===
Result	Date	Tournament	Tier	Surface	Partner	Opponents	Score
Win	August, 1990	Schenectady, U.S.	Tier V	Hard	(Japan) Nana Miyagi	(Italy) Linda Ferrando (West Germany) Wiltrud Probst	6–4, 5–7, 6–3
