= Brian Joelson =

American tennis player

- Full name: Brian Joelson
- Country (sports): United States
- Born: September 30, 1961 (age 63); Columbus, Georgia
- Height: 6 ft 0 in (1.83 m)
- Plays: Right-handed
- Prize money: $71,427

Singles
- Career record: 0–1
- Career titles: 0
- Highest ranking: No. 221 (March 9, 1992)

Grand Slam singles results
- Wimbledon: 1R (1993)

Doubles
- Career record: 3–7
- Career titles: 0
- Highest ranking: No. 142 (October 26, 1992)

Grand Slam doubles results
- Australian Open: 1R (1993)
- Wimbledon: 1R (1992)

Brian Joelson (born September 30, 1961) is a former professional tennis player from the United States.

== Biography ==
Joelson was born in Georgia and grew up in Portland, Oregon, attending Aloha High School.

While playing a junior tournament in Texas at the age of 17 he caught the eye of the Texas A&M University coach who was in attendance to watch another player. From 1979 to 1983 he attended Texas A&M and played collegiate tennis in the Southwest Conference.

For the remainder of the decade he spent several years as the head pro at a Mercer Island tennis club and made an attempt in 1987 to play on tour, but was only able to feature in satellites.

=== Professional career ===
Joelson made a return to the professional circuit in 1991 and that year reached the main draw of an ATP Tour tournament for the first time at the age of 29, the doubles at the OTB International Open in Schenectady. At the same tournament in 1992, he and partner Richard Matuszewski reached the doubles semi-finals. He played in the men's doubles at both the 1992 Wimbledon Championships and 1993 Australian Open, both with Mike Bauer. At Challenger level he was a losing doubles finalist on four occasions.

As a singles player he never featured on the ATP Tour but did qualify for the 1993 Wimbledon Championships. In the qualifiers he started with tight wins over Clinton Marsh and Kenny Thorne, the latter match decided 11–9 in the final set, before securing a spot in the main draw with a straight sets win over Mark Knowles. In the first round he came up against Israeli Amos Mansdorf, who had a world ranking of 28. Joelson began well and got to a two set lead, before Mansdorf fought back to claim the third in a tiebreak and the final two sets 6–3, to eliminate the American and book a second round match-up with Stefan Edberg.

After retiring he spent some time as a travelling coach of the Jensen brothers, Luke and Murphy.

=== Personal life ===
Joelson and wife Teresa have three children. The eldest, Brett, was a finalist in the boys' doubles at the 2001 US Open and made it to 226 in the world as a doubles specialist on the professional tour. His daughter Ashley played for UCLA.

He works as a financial advisor in Portland.

In 2008 he was inducted into the Pacific Northwest Tennis Hall of Fame.
