= Wiltrud Probst =

German tennis player

- Country (sports): Germany; West Germany
- Born: 29 May 1969 (age 56) Nuremberg, West Germany
- Height: 1.70 m (5 ft 7 in)
- Turned pro: 1985
- Retired: 1999
- Plays: Right-handed
- Prize money: US$824,173

Singles
- Career record: 249–228
- Career titles: 2 WTA
- Highest ranking: No. 31 (4 February 1991)

Grand Slam singles results
- Australian Open: 2R (1987, 1991, 1993–95, 1997)
- French Open: 4R (1990)
- Wimbledon: 3R (1991)
- US Open: 2R (1990, 1997)

Doubles
- Career record: 133–167
- Career titles: 0 WTA, 1 ITF
- Highest ranking: No. 32 (8 January 1996)

Grand Slam doubles results
- Australian Open: 3R (1995)
- French Open: 3R (1990, 91, 1994, 1998)
- Wimbledon: 3R (1996)
- US Open: 2R (1990, 91, 1997)

Wiltrud Probst (born 29 May 1969) is a former tennis player from Germany.

She was ranked world No. 31 on 4 February 1991. Probst won in singles two titles on the WTA Tour. In 1990, she won the tournament in the New Zealand capital Wellington by a final victory over Leila Meskhi. In 1992, she won the final of the Belgian Open against compatriot Meike Babel. Her most successful Grand Slam tournament she played in 1990, when she reached the knockout stages at the French Open, in which she defeated world No. 10, Conchita Martínez. Probst retired from tour 1999.

== WTA Tour finals ==
Category ( W–L )	Singles	Doubles
Tier I	0–0	0–0
Tier II	0–0	0–0
Tier III	0–0	0–2
Tier IV	2–0	1–0

Surface ( W–L )	Singles	Doubles
Hard	1–0	0–0
Clay	1–0	0–5
Grass	0–0	0–0
Carpet	0–0	0–1

=== Singles: 2 (titles) ===
Result	W/L	Date	Tournament	Surface	Opponent	Score
Win	1–0	Feb 1990	Wellington, New Zealand	Hard	(Soviet Union) Leila Meskhi	1–6, 6–4, 6–0
Win	2–0	May 1992	Waregem, Belgium	Clay	(Germany) Meike Babel	6–2, 6–3

=== Doubles: 7 (runner-ups) ===
Result	W/L	Date	Tournament	Surface	Partner	Opponents	Score
Loss	0–1	Sep 1986	Athens, Greece	Clay	(West Germany) Silke Meier	(West Germany) Isabel Cueto (Spain) Arantxa Sánchez Vicario	6–4, 2–6, 4–6
Loss	0–2	Aug 1990	Schenectady, New York, US	Hard	(Italy) Linda Ferrando	(United States) Alysia May (Japan) Nana Miyagi	4–6, 7–5, 3–6
Loss	0–3	Jul 1992	Kitzbühel, Austria	Clay	(South Africa) Amanda Coetzer	(Argentina) Florencia Labat (France) Alexia Dechaume	3–6, 3–6
Loss	0–4	Oct 1993	Essen, Germany	Hard	(Germany) Christina Singer	(Spain) Arantxa Sánchez Vicario (Czech Republic) Helena Suková	2–6, 2–6
Loss	0–5	Apr 1995	Houston, Texas, US	Clay	(Canada) Rene Simpson	(United States) Nicole Arendt (Netherlands) Manon Bollegraf	4–6, 2–6
Loss	0–6	Jul 1995	Maria Lankowitz, Austria	Clay	(France) Alexandra Fusai	(Italy) Silvia Farina (Hungary) Andrea Temesvári	2–6, 2–6
Loss	0–7	Aug 1997	Maria Lankowitz, Austria	Clay	(Czech Republic) Radka Bobková	(Czech Republic) Eva Melicharová (Czech Republic) Helena Vildová	2–6, 2–6

== ITF finals ==
=== Singles (0–5) ===
Legend
$50,000 tournaments
$25,000 tournaments
$10,000 tournaments

Result	No.	Date	Tournament	Surface	Opponent	Score
Loss	1.	7 April 1986	Caserta, Italy	Clay	(Brazil) Gisele Miró	3–6, 6–2, 3–6
Loss	2.	21 April 1986	Taranto, Italy	Clay	(Argentina) Patricia Tarabini	2–6, 1–6
Loss	3.	13 July 1987	Erlangen, West Germany	Clay	(France) Julie Halard-Decugis	6–4, 4–6, 2–6
Loss	4.	16 July 1989	Erlangen, West Germany	Clay	(Bulgaria) Elena Pampoulova	1–6, 6–2, 3–6
Loss	5.	14 October 1996	Cardiff, United Kingdom	Hard	(France) Anne-Gaëlle Sidot	1–6, 5–7

=== Doubles (1–4) ===
Result	No.	Date	Tournament	Surface	Partner	Opponents	Score
Loss	1.	28 October 1985	Peterborough, United Kingdom	Hard	(West Germany) Claudia Porwik	(Czechoslovakia) Regina Rajchrtová (Czechoslovakia) Jana Novotná	7–5, 3–6, 4–6
Loss	2.	11 November 1985	Queens, United Kingdom	Hard	(West Germany) Claudia Porwik	(West Germany) Christina Singer-Bath (Czechoslovakia) Petra Tesarová	7–5, 4–6, 3–6
Loss	3.	31 March 1986	Bari, Italy	Clay	(United Kingdom) Belinda Borneo	(Netherlands) Nanette Schutte (Netherlands) Marianne van der Torre	6–4, 6–7, 3–6
Loss	4.	7 April 1986	Caserta, Italy	Clay	(Netherlands) Marianne van der Torre	(Argentina) Bettina Fulco (Brazil) Gisele Miro	3–6, 3–6
Win	5.	10 July 1989	Erlangen, West Germany	Clay	(West Germany) Andrea Betzner	(Netherlands) Ingelise Driehuis (United States) Jennifer Fuchs	6–2, 6–3
