= Bernd Karbacher =

German tennis player

- Country (sports): Germany
- Born: 3 April 1968 (age 57) Munich, West Germany
- Height: 1.85 m (6 ft 1 in)
- Turned pro: 1989
- Retired: 2000
- Plays: Right-handed (two-handed backhand)
- Prize money: US$2,043,057

Singles
- Career record: 135–161
- Career titles: 2; 1 Challenger, 0 Futures
- Highest ranking: No. 22 (17 April 1995)

Grand Slam singles results
- Australian Open: 3R (1997)
- French Open: QF (1996)
- Wimbledon: 2R (1992, 1995)
- US Open: QF (1994)

Doubles
- Career record: 21–23
- Career titles: 1; 1 Challenger, 0 Futures
- Highest ranking: No. 163 (6 June 1994)
- Last updated on: 21 December 2021.

Bernd Karbacher (born 3 April 1968) is a German retired professional tennis player. His highest ATP singles ranking is world No. 22, which he reached on 17 April 1995. His career-high doubles ranking was world No. 163, achieved on 6 June 1994.

During his career, he won two singles titles, Cologne in 1992 and the Swedish Open in Båstad in 1994.

He twice reached the quarterfinals of a Grand Slam tournament. He did so in 1994 at the US Open after defeating Ivan Lendl and at the French Open in 1996 after a win against Goran Ivanišević. He also reached the semifinals of the 1993 Hamburg Masters and reached the finals of Indianapolis in 1995 after defeating Pete Sampras.

At the 1998 US Open, Karbacher, then ranked world No. 155, upset Australian Open champion and fourth seed Petr Korda in the first round in four sets.

He retired from professional tennis in 2000. Since 2007, he has been the president of the German players organization "Tennis Germany".

== ATP career finals ==
=== Singles: 3 (2 titles, 1 runner-up) ===
Legend Grand Slam Tournaments (0–0) ATP World Tour Finals (0–0) ATP World Tour Masters Series (0–0) ATP Championship Series (0–1) ATP World Series (2–0)	Finals by surface Hard (0–1) Clay (2–0) Grass (0–0) Carpet (0–0)	Finals by setting Outdoors (2–1) Indoors (0–0)

Result	W–L	Date	Tournament	Tier	Surface	Opponent	Score
Win	1–0	Sep 1992	Cologne, Germany	World Series	Clay	(South Africa) Marcos Ondruska	7–6^{(7–4)}, 6–4
Win	2–0	Jul 1994	Båstad, Sweden	World Series	Clay	(Austria) Horst Skoff	6–4, 6–3
Loss	2–1	Aug 1995	Indianapolis, United States	Championship Series	Hard	(Sweden) Thomas Enqvist	4–6, 3–6

=== Doubles: 1 (1 title) ===
Legend Grand Slam Tournaments (0–0) ATP World Tour Finals (0–0) ATP Masters Series (0–0) ATP Championship Series (0–0) ATP World Series (1–0)	Finals by surface Hard (1–0) Clay (0–0) Grass (0–0) Carpet (0–0)	Finals by setting Outdoors (1–0) Indoors (0–0)

Result	W–L	Date	Tournament	Tier	Surface	Partner	Opponents	Score
Win	1–0	Aug 1993	Schenectady, United States	World Series	Hard	(Russia) Andrei Olhovskiy	(Zimbabwe) Byron Black (New Zealand) Brett Steven	2–6, 7–6, 6–1

== ATP Challenger and ITF Futures finals ==
=== Singles: 2 (1–1) ===
Legend ATP Challenger (1–1) ITF Futures (0–0)	Finals by surface Hard (1–1) Clay (0–0) Grass (0–0) Carpet (0–0)

Result	W–L	Date	Tournament	Tier	Surface	Opponent	Score
Win	1–0	Dec 1991	Hong Kong, Hong Kong	Challenger	Hard	(Canada) Greg Rusedski	6–2, 3–6, 6–1
Loss	1–1	Nov 1992	Brest, France	Challenger	Hard	(South Africa) Marcos Ondruska	7–5, 3–6, 0–6

=== Doubles: 2 (1–1) ===
Legend ATP Challenger (1–1) ITF Futures (0–0)	Finals by surface Hard (0–0) Clay (1–1) Grass (0–0) Carpet (0–0)

Result	W–L	Date	Tournament	Tier	Surface	Partner	Opponents	Score
Win	1–0	Jun 1992	Cologne, Germany	Challenger	Clay	(Germany) Marc-Kevin Goellner	(United States) Murphy Jensen (United States) Brian Devening	6–4, 6–7, 6–1
Loss	1–1	Mar 1994	Agadir, Morocco	Challenger	Clay	(Sweden) Tomas Nydahl	(Czech Republic) Slava Doseděl (Netherlands) Mark Koevermans	7–6, 3–6, 6–7

== Performance timeline ==
Key
W	F	SF	QF	#R	RR	Q#	DNQ	A	NH

(W) winner; (F) finalist; (SF) semifinalist; (QF) quarterfinalist; (#R) rounds 4, 3, 2, 1; (RR) round-robin stage; (Q#) qualification round; (DNQ) did not qualify; (A) absent; (NH) not held; (SR) strike rate (events won / competed); (W–L) win–loss record.

=== Singles ===
Tournament	1991	1992	1993	1994	1995	1996	1997	1998	1999	2000	SR	W–L	Win %
Grand Slam tournaments
Australian Open	A	A	2R	1R	1R	1R	3R	A	1R	1R	0 / 7	3–7	30%
French Open	A	1R	3R	2R	3R	QF	A	1R	2R	A	0 / 7	10–7	59%
Wimbledon	Q1	2R	1R	1R	2R	A	1R	A	1R	A	0 / 6	2–6	25%
US Open	A	A	3R	QF	1R	2R	Q2	2R	1R	A	0 / 6	8–6	57%
Win–loss	0–0	1–2	5–4	5–4	3–4	5–3	2–2	1–2	1–4	0–1	0 / 26	23–26	47%
ATP Masters Series
Indian Wells	A	2R	2R	1R	1R	2R	A	A	A	A	0 / 5	3–5	38%
Miami	A	2R	2R	1R	4R	2R	A	Q2	Q2	Q1	0 / 5	5–5	50%
Monte Carlo	A	A	1R	2R	2R	1R	A	A	A	A	0 / 4	2–4	33%
Hamburg	A	A	SF	2R	1R	2R	A	1R	Q1	A	0 / 5	6–5	55%
Rome	A	A	2R	A	A	2R	A	A	Q1	A	0 / 2	2–2	50%
Canada	A	A	A	A	A	1R	A	A	1R	A	0 / 2	0–2	0%
Cincinnati	A	A	A	A	3R	3R	A	A	Q2	A	0 / 2	4–2	67%
Paris	A	A	A	2R	1R	A	A	A	A	A	0 / 2	1–2	33%
Win–loss	0–0	2–2	7–5	3–5	5–6	6–7	0–0	0–1	0–1	0–0	0 / 27	23–27	46%
