= OTB Open =

Defunct tennis tournament
- Event name: OTB Open (1985–89); OTB International Open (1990–94)
- Tour: WTA Tour (1985–94); Grand Prix circuit (1987–89); ATP Tour (1990–94)
- Sponsor: Capital OTB
- Founded: 1985
- Abolished: 1994
- Editions: 8
- Location: Schenectady, New York, U.S.
- Surface: Hard

The OTB Open was a WTA Tour, Grand Prix and ATP Tour affiliated tennis tournament played from 1985 to 1994. It was held in Schenectady, New York, and played on outdoor hard courts. It was sponsored by the Capital District Regional Off-Track Betting Corporation.

== Results ==
=== Men's singles ===
Year	Champions	Runners-up	Score
1987	(Peru) Jaime Yzaga	(United States) Jim Pugh	0–6, 7–6, 6–1
1988	(United States) Tim Mayotte	(United States) Johan Kriek	5–7, 6–3, 6–2
1989	(Australia) Simon Youl	(United States) Scott Davis	2–6, 6–4, 6–4
1990	(India) Ramesh Krishnan	(New Zealand) Kelly Evernden	6–1, 6–1
1991	(Germany) Michael Stich	(Spain) Emilio Sánchez	6–2, 6–4
1992	(South Africa) Wayne Ferreira	(Australia) Jamie Morgan	6–2, 6–7, 6–2
1993	(Sweden) Thomas Enqvist	(New Zealand) Brett Steven	4–6, 6–3, 7–6
1994	(Netherlands) Jacco Eltingh	(United States) Chuck Adams	6–3, 6–4

=== Women's singles ===
Year	Champions	Runners-up	Score
1985	(United States) Linda Gates	(United States) Jenni Goodling	6–1, 6–1
1986	(Brazil) Luciana Corsato	(United States) Jennifer Fuchs	6–0, 6–4
1987	(United States) Camille Benjamin	(United States) Vicki Nelson-Dunbar	6–2, 6–3
1988	(United States) Gretchen Magers	(United States) Terry Phelps	7–6, 6–4
1989	(Peru) Laura Gildemeister	(United States) Marianne Werdel	6–4, 6–3
1990	(West Germany) Anke Huber	(United States) Marianne Werdel	6–1, 5–7, 6–4
1991	(Netherlands) Brenda Schultz	(France) Alexia Dechaume	7–6, 6–2
1992	(Germany) Barbara Rittner	(Netherlands) Brenda Schultz	7–6, 6–3
1993	(Latvia) Larisa Neiland	(Ukraine) Natalia Medvedeva	6–3, 7–5
1994	(Austria) Judith Wiesner	(Latvia) Larisa Neiland	7–5, 3–6, 6–4

=== Men's doubles ===
Year	Champions	Runners-up	Score
1987	(United States) Gary Donnelly (South Africa) Gary Muller	(United States) Brad Pearce (United States) Jim Pugh	7–6, 6–2
1988	(West Germany) Alexander Mronz (United States) Greg Van Emburgh	(United States) Paul Annacone (United States) Patrick McEnroe	6–3, 6–7, 7–5
1989	(United States) Scott Davis (Australia) Broderick Dyke	(United States) Brad Pearce (South Africa) Byron Talbot	6–2, 7–6
1990	(Australia) Richard Fromberg (United States) Brad Pearce	(United States) Brian Garrow (United States) Sven Salumaa	6–2, 3–6, 7–6
1991	(Spain) Javier Sánchez (Australia) Todd Woodbridge	(Ecuador) Andrés Gómez (Spain) Emilio Sánchez	3–6, 7–6, 7–6
1992	(Netherlands) Jacco Eltingh (Netherlands) Paul Haarhuis	(Spain) Sergio Casal (Spain) Emilio Sánchez	6–3, 6–4
1993	(Germany) Bernd Karbacher (Russia) Andrei Olhovskiy	(Zimbabwe) Byron Black (New Zealand) Brett Steven	2–6, 7–6, 6–1
1994	(Sweden) Jan Apell (Sweden) Jonas Björkman	(Netherlands) Jacco Eltingh (Netherlands) Paul Haarhuis	6–4, 7–6

=== Women's doubles ===
Year	Champions	Runners-up	Score
1985	(United States) Linda Gates (United States) Lynn Lewis	(United States) Cecilia Fernandez (United States) Helena Manset	7–6, 6–4
1986	(United States) Laura Glitz (United States) Jenni Goodling	(United States) Jennifer Fuchs (United States) Dena Levy	6–3, 3–6, 6–0
1987	(United States) Jenni Goodling (United States) Wendy Wood	(Brazil) Patricia Medrado (Brazil) Cláudia Monteiro	5–7, 6–2, 6–3
1988	(United States) Ann Henricksson (New Zealand) Julie Richardson	(United States) Lea Antonoplis (United States) Cammy MacGregor	6–3, 3–6, 7–5
1989	(Australia) Michelle Jaggard (United States) Hu Na	(United States) Sandra Birch (United States) Debbie Graham	6–3, 6–2
1990	(United States) Alysia May (Japan) Nana Miyagi	(Italy) Linda Ferrando (West Germany) Wiltrud Probst	6–4, 5–7, 6–3
1991	(Australia) Rachel McQuillan (West Germany) Claudia Porwik	(United States) Nicole Arendt (United States) Shannan McCarthy	6–2, 6–4
1992	(France) Alexia Dechaume (Argentina) Florencia Labat	(United States) Ginger Helgeson (United States) Shannan McCarthy	6–3, 1–6, 6–2
1993	(Australia) Rachel McQuillan (Germany) Claudia Porwik	(Argentina) Florencia Labat (Germany) Barbara Rittner	4–6, 6–4, 6–2
1994	(United States) Meredith McGrath (Latvia) Larisa Neiland	(United States) Pam Shriver (Australia) Elizabeth Smylie	6–2, 6–2
