= 1993 Abierto Mexicano – Singles =

Singles
- 1993 Abierto Mexicano

Final
- Champion: (Austria) Thomas Muster
- Runner-up: (Spain) Carlos Costa
- Score: 6–2, 6–4

Details
- Draw: 32 (2WC/4Q)
- Seeds: 8

Events
Singles	Doubles
Mexican Open	· 1994 →

In the first edition of the tournament, Thomas Muster won the title by defeating Carlos Costa 6–2, 6–4 in the final.

== Seeds ==
1. (Spain) Carlos Costa (final)
2. (Austria) Thomas Muster (champion)
3. (Spain) Jordi Arrese (first round)
4. (Brazil) Jaime Oncins (first round)
5. (Argentina) Franco Davín (first round)
6. (Mexico) Luis Herrera (first round)
7. (United States) Jeff Tarango (quarterfinals)
8. (France) Rodolphe Gilbert (first round)

== Draw ==
=== Key ===
- Q = Qualifier
- WC = Wild card
- LL = Lucky loser
- Alt = Alternate
- SE = Special exempt
- PR = Protected ranking
- ITF = ITF entry
- JE = Junior exempt
- w/o = Walkover
- r = Retired
- d = Defaulted
- SR = Special ranking

=== Finals ===
Semifinals
1	(Spain) Carlos Costa	6	4	6
(United States) Francisco Montana	4	6	3
WC	(Mexico) Oliver Fernández	3	4
2	(Austria) Thomas Muster	6	6

Final
1	(Spain) Carlos Costa	2	4
2	(Austria) Thomas Muster	6	6

=== Top half ===
First round
1	(Spain) C Costa	6	6^{6}	7^{7}
WC	(Ecuador) A Gómez	4	7^{8}	6^{3}
(United States) T Witsken	5	2
(Argentina) H de la Peña	7	6
(Portugal) J Cunha e Silva	6	3	3
(Spain) À Corretja	2	6	6
(Czech Republic) M Střelba	4	2
7	(United States) J Tarango	6	6
4	(Brazil) J Oncins	6	4	2
(Mexico) L Lavalle	3	6	6
Q	(United States) B Devening	5	6^{4}
(United States) B Shelton	7	7^{7}
(United States) F Montana	6	6
Q	(United States) M Shyjan	2	0
(Argentina) M Jaite	6^{6}	6	3
6	(Mexico) L Herrera	7^{8}	1	6

Second round
1	(Spain) C Costa	6	6
(Argentina) H de la Peña	4	3
(Spain) À Corretja	3	0
7	(United States) J Tarango	6	6
(Mexico) L Lavalle	1	6	7
(United States) B Shelton	6	4	5
(United States) F Montana	6	6
(Argentina) M Jaite	4	3

Quarterfinals
1	(Spain) C Costa	6	6
7	(United States) J Tarango	4	4
(Mexico) L Lavalle	6^{5}	4
(United States) F Montana	7^{7}	6

Semifinals
1	(Spain) C Costa	6	4	6
(United States) F Montana	4	6	3

=== Bottom half ===
First round
5	(Argentina) F Davín	6^{3}	6	4
WC	(Mexico) O Fernández	7^{7}	2	6
Q	(Mexico) J Lozano	4	3
WC	(Mexico) A Moreno	6	6
(United States) P McEnroe	4	6	7
(Venezuela) N Pereira	6	1	5
(Spain) A Berasategui	2	6	6
3	(Spain) J Arrese	6	1	0
8	(France) R Gilbert	1	0
(Zimbabwe) B Black	6	6
(Austria) G Schaller	1	2
(Austria) H Skoff	6	6
(Argentina) C Miniussi	6	6
(Argentina) R Azar	2	3
Q	(Sweden) J Donar	2	2
2	(Austria) T Muster	6	6

Second round
WC	(Mexico) O Fernández	6	6
WC	(Mexico) A Moreno	4	3
(United States) P McEnroe	3	1
(Spain) A Berasategui	6	6
(Zimbabwe) B Black	0	2
(Austria) H Skoff	6	6
(Argentina) C Miniussi	3	6^{6}
2	(Austria) T Muster	6	7^{8}

Quarterfinals
WC	(Mexico) O Fernández	6	4	7
(Spain) A Berasategui	4	6	5
(Austria) H Skoff	2	5
2	(Austria) T Muster	6	7

Semifinals
WC	(Mexico) O Fernández	3	4
2	(Austria) T Muster	6	6
