= 1992 Kolynos Cup =

- Date: 2–8 November
- Edition: 2nd
- Category: ATP World Series
- Draw: 32S / 16D
- Prize money: $155,000
- Surface: Hard / outdoor
- Location: Búzios, Brazil

Champions

Singles
- (Brazil) Jaime Oncins

Doubles
- (Venezuela) Maurice Ruah / (Cuba) Mario Tabares
| ← 1991 · | ATP Buzios |

The 1992 Kolynos Cup, also known as the Búzios Open, was a men's tennis tournament held in Búzios, Brazil and played on outdoor hardcourt. It was part of the World Series category of the 1992 ATP Tour. It was the second and last edition of the tournament and took place from 2 November through 8 November 1992. Fifth-seeded Jaime Oncins won the singles title.

== Finals ==
=== Singles ===
(Brazil) Jaime Oncins defeated (Mexico) Luis Herrera 6–3, 6–2

- It was Oncins' 2nd singles title of the year and the 2nd and last of his career.

=== Doubles ===
(Venezuela) Maurice Ruah / (Cuba) Mario Tabares defeated (United States) Mark Keil / (United States) Tom Mercer 7–6, 6–7, 6–4

- It was Ruah's only doubles title of his career. It was Tabares' only doubles title of his career.
