= 1993 Abierto Mexicano – Doubles =

Doubles
- 1993 Abierto Mexicano

Final
- Champions: (Mexico) Leonardo Lavalle (Brazil) Jaime Oncins
- Runners-up: (Argentina) Horacio de la Peña (Mexico) Jorge Lozano
- Score: 7–6, 6–4

Details
- Draw: 16
- Seeds: 4

Events
Singles	Doubles
Mexican Open	· 1994 →

In the first edition of the tournament, Leonardo Lavalle and Jaime Oncins won the title by defeating Horacio de la Peña and Jorge Lozano 7–6, 6–4 in the final.

== Seeds ==
1. (Zimbabwe) Byron Black / (United States) Todd Witsken (quarterfinals)
2. (South Africa) Royce Deppe / (South Africa) Brent Haygarth (first round)
3. (United States) Francisco Montana / (United States) Bryan Shelton (semifinals)
4. (Sweden) Christer Allgårdh / (Sweden) Johan Donar (semifinals)

== Draw ==
=== Key ===
- Q = Qualifier
- WC = Wild card
- LL = Lucky loser
- Alt = Alternate
- SE = Special exempt
- PR = Protected ranking
- ITF = ITF entry
- JE = Junior exempt
- w/o = Walkover
- r = Retired
- d = Defaulted
- SR = Special ranking

=== Draw ===
First round
1	(Zimbabwe) B Black (United States) T Witsken	6	6
(Venezuela) A Mora (Cuba) M Tabares	0	4
(Argentina) H de la Peña (Mexico) J Lozano	6	6
(Argentina) P Albano (Argentina) C Miniussi	0	2
3	(United States) F Montana (United States) B Shelton	3	6	6
(United States) B Devening (United States) T Mercer	6	3	4
WC	(Argentina) M Jaite (Austria) T Muster	6	3	5
(United States) T Nelson (Sweden) T Svantesson	3	6	7
(Ecuador) A Gómez (Venezuela) N Pereira	6	6	5
WC	(Mexico) L Herrera (Mexico) A Moreno	7	4	7
Q	(Mexico) Erik Casas (Canada) A Sznajder	4	6	2
4	(Sweden) C Allgårdh (Sweden) J Donar	6	3	6
(United States) D Eisenman (United States) B Joelson	7	6	7
(United States) M Bauer (Portugal) J Cunha e Silva	5	7	6
(Mexico) L Lavalle (Brazil) J Oncins	7	7
2	(South Africa) R Deppe (South Africa) K Haygarth	6	6

Quarterfinals
1	(Zimbabwe) B Black (United States) T Witsken	4	6
(Argentina) H de la Peña (Mexico) J Lozano	6	7
3	(United States) F Montana (United States) B Shelton	7	6
(United States) T Nelson (Sweden) T Svantesson	6	4
WC	(Mexico) L Herrera (Mexico) A Moreno	3	2
4	(Sweden) C Allgårdh (Sweden) J Donar	6	6
(United States) D Eisenman (United States) B Joelson	6	4	3
(Mexico) L Lavalle (Brazil) J Oncins	2	6	6

Semifinals
(Argentina) H de la Peña (Mexico) J Lozano	6	6
3	(United States) F Montana (United States) B Shelton	3	4
4	(Sweden) C Allgårdh (Sweden) J Donar	6	2	6
(Mexico) L Lavalle (Brazil) J Oncins	1	6	7

Final
(Argentina) H de la Peña (Mexico) J Lozano	6	4
(Mexico) L Lavalle (Brazil) J Oncins	7	6
