= 1993 Campionati Internazionali di Sicilia – Doubles =

Doubles
- 1993 Campionati Internazionali di Sicilia

Final
- Champions: (Spain) Sergio Casal (Spain) Emilio Sánchez
- Runners-up: (Argentina) Juan Garat (Mexico) Jorge Lozano
- Score: 6–3, 6–3

Events
| Singles | Doubles |
| ← 1992 · | Campionati Internazionali di Sicilia | · 1994 → |

Johan Donar and Ola Jonsson were the defending champions, but lost in the first round to Sergio Casal and Emilio Sánchez.

Casal and Sánchez won the title by defeating Juan Garat and Jorge Lozano 6–3, 6–3 in the final.

== Seeds ==
1. (Spain) Sergio Casal / (Spain) Emilio Sánchez (champions)
2. (Italy) Diego Nargiso / (Spain) Javier Sánchez (first round)
3. (n/a)
4. (Argentina) Juan Garat / (Mexico) Jorge Lozano (final)

== Draw ==
=== Key ===
- Q = Qualifier
- WC = Wild card
- LL = Lucky loser
- Alt = Alternate
- SE = Special exempt
- PR = Protected ranking
- ITF = ITF entry
- JE = Junior exempt
- w/o = Walkover
- r = Retired
- d = Defaulted
- SR = Special ranking

=== Draw ===
First round
1 | (Spain) S Casal (Spain) E Sánchez | 6 | 6
LL | (Sweden) J Donar (Sweden) O Jonsson | 2 | 3
(United States) D Eisenman (United States) D Johnson | 6 | 6
(Spain) J Burillo (Netherlands) M Koevermans | 2 | 3
LL | (Italy) Daniele Ceraudo (Italy) Riccardo Ciruolo | 3 | 2
WC | (Italy) C Brandi (Italy) F Mordegan | 6 | 6
(Argentina) H de la Peña (United States) F Montana | 6 | 3
(Brazil) L Mattar (Brazil) J Oncins | 7 | 6
(South Africa) M Barnard (United States) T Mercer | 2 | 3
(United States) R Benson (United States) G Van Emburgh | 6 | 6
Q | (Sweden) R Båthman (Argentina) R Saad | 5 | 4
4 | (Argentina) J Garat (Mexico) J Lozano | 7 | 6
(United States) K Kinnear (Sweden) T Svantesson | 3 | 6 | 2
(United States) B Garnett (United States) TJ Middleton | 6 | 3 | 6
WC | (Italy) A Gaudenzi (Italy) S Pescosolido | 6 | 1 | 7
2 | (Italy) D Nargiso (Spain) J Sánchez | 2 | 6 | 6

Quarterfinals
1 | (Spain) S Casal (Spain) E Sánchez | 6 | 7
(United States) D Eisenman (United States) D Johnson | 1 | 6
WC | (Italy) C Brandi (Italy) F Mordegan | 2 | 1
(Brazil) L Mattar (Brazil) J Oncins | 6 | 6
(United States) R Benson (United States) G Van Emburgh | 6 | 1
4 | (Argentina) J Garat (Mexico) J Lozano | 7 | 6
(United States) B Garnett (United States) TJ Middleton | 7 | 7
WC | (Italy) A Gaudenzi (Italy) S Pescosolido | 6 | 5

Semifinals
1 | (Spain) S Casal (Spain) E Sánchez | 6 | 6
(Brazil) L Mattar (Brazil) J Oncins | 1 | 0
4 | (Argentina) J Garat (Mexico) J Lozano | 6 | 6
(United States) B Garnett (United States) TJ Middleton | 4 | 0

Final
1 | (Spain) S Casal (Spain) E Sánchez | 6 | 6
4 | (Argentina) J Garat (Mexico) J Lozano | 3 | 3
