= 1993 Lipton Championships – Men's doubles =

Men's doubles
- 1993 Lipton Championships

Final
- Champions: (Netherlands) Richard Krajicek (Netherlands) Jan Siemerink
- Runners-up: (United States) Patrick McEnroe (United States) Jonathan Stark
- Score: 6–7, 6–4, 7–6

Details
- Draw: 48 (5WC/2Q)
- Seeds: 16

Events
Singles	men	women
Doubles	men	women
- Miami Open

Ken Flach and Todd Witsken were the defending champions, but lost in the second round to Johan Donar and Ola Jonsson.

Wild cards Richard Krajicek and Jan Siemerink won the title, defeating Patrick McEnroe and Jonathan Stark 6–7, 6–4, 7–6 in the final.

== Seeds ==
All seeds received a bye into the second round.

1. (South Africa) Danie Visser / (Australia) Laurie Warder (second round)
2. (United States) Ken Flach / (United States) Rick Leach (second round)
3. (United States) Patrick McEnroe / (United States) Jonathan Stark (final)
4. (Canada) Grant Connell / (United States) Patrick Galbraith (second round)
5. (Australia) John Fitzgerald / (United States) Trevor Kronemann (second round)
6. (Netherlands) Tom Nijssen / (Czech Republic) Cyril Suk (second round)
7. (United States) Steve DeVries / (Australia) David Macpherson (quarterfinals)
8. (South Africa) Wayne Ferreira / (Germany) Michael Stich (second round)
9. (Netherlands) Jacco Eltingh / (Netherlands) Paul Haarhuis (quarterfinals)
10. (South Africa) David Adams / (Russia) Andrei Olhovskiy (third round)
11. (Spain) Sergio Casal / (Spain) Emilio Sánchez (third round)
12. (Australia) Mark Kratzmann / (Australia) Simon Youl (third round)
13. (United States) Ken Flach / (United States) Todd Witsken (second round)
14. (South Africa) Gary Muller / (Spain) Javier Sánchez (second round)
15. (United States) Shelby Cannon / (United States) Scott Melville (second round)
16. (South Africa) Marcos Ondruska / (United States) Brad Pearce (second round)

== Draw ==
Key

- Q = Qualifier
- WC = Wild card
- LL = Lucky loser
- Alt = Alternate
- ITF = ITF entry
- PR = Protected ranking
- SR = Special ranking
- SE = Special exempt
- JE = Junior exempt
- JR = Junior Accelerator Programme entrant
- CO = College Accelerator Programme entrant
- NG = Next Gen Accelerator Program entrant
- w/o = Walkover
- r = Retired
- d = Defaulted

=== Finals ===
Semifinals
(Zimbabwe) Byron Black (United States) Mike Briggs	6	4	4
3	(United States) Patrick McEnroe (United States) Jonathan Stark	3	6	6
WC	(Netherlands) Richard Krajicek (Netherlands) Jan Siemerink	w/o
WC	(United States) Paul Annacone (United States) David Wheaton

Final
3	(United States) Patrick McEnroe (United States) Jonathan Stark	7	4	6
WC	(Netherlands) Richard Krajicek (Netherlands) Jan Siemerink	6	6	7

=== Top half ===
==== Section 1 ====
First round
(Zimbabwe) B Black (United States) M Briggs	7	2	6
(United States) K Kinnear (United States) S Salumaa	6	6	0
(Sweden) R Båthman (Sweden) R Bergh	6	7
(United States) L Jensen (United States) M Jensen	4	6
Q	(France) A Boetsch (France) O Delaître	5	6
WC	(United States) T Martin (United States) D Rostagno	7	7
(Belgium) L Pimek (Germany) D Prinosil	1	6
(South Africa) B Haygarth (South Africa) B Talbot	6	7

Second round
1	(South Africa) D Visser (Australia) L Warder	6	5	3
(Zimbabwe) B Black (United States) M Briggs	3	7	6
(Sweden) R Båthman (Sweden) R Bergh	6	1	6
16	(South Africa) M Ondruska (United States) B Pearce	4	6	1
10	(South Africa) D Adams (Russia) A Olhovskiy	7	6
WC	(United States) T Martin (United States) D Rostagno	6	3
(South Africa) B Haygarth (South Africa) B Talbot	0	1
7	(United States) S DeVries (Australia) D Macpherson	6	6

Third round
(Zimbabwe) B Black (United States) M Briggs	6	6
(Sweden) R Båthman (Sweden) R Bergh	2	1
10	(South Africa) D Adams (Russia) A Olhovskiy	7	6	6
7	(United States) S DeVries (Australia) D Macpherson	6	7	7

Quarterfinals
(Zimbabwe) B Black (United States) M Briggs	6	6
7	(United States) S DeVries (Australia) D Macpherson	1	1

==== Section 2 ====
First round
(United States) J Pugh (United States) G Van Emburgh	6	6
(South Africa) R Deppe (United States) K Thorne	4	4
(Sweden) J Donar (Sweden) O Jonsson	1	6	6
(United States) D Eisenman (The Bahamas) M Knowles	6	4	3
(Australia) C Limberger (United States) T Nelson	4	4
Q	(United States) D Johnson (Venezuela) M Ruah	6	6
(Canada) G Michibata (United States) D Pate	6	6	6
(Sweden) S Edberg (Czech Republic) P Korda	4	7	7

Second round
3	(United States) P McEnroe (United States) J Stark	6	6
(United States) J Pugh (United States) G Van Emburgh	3	4
(Sweden) J Donar (Sweden) O Jonsson	6	6
WC/13	(United States) K Flach (United States) T Witsken	2	3
11	(Spain) S Casal (Spain) E Sánchez	6	6
Q	(United States) D Johnson (Venezuela) M Ruah	3	4
(Sweden) S Edberg (Czech Republic) P Korda	3	7	6
6	(Netherlands) T Nijssen (Czech Republic) C Suk	6	6	4

Third round
3	(United States) P McEnroe (United States) J Stark	6	7
(Sweden) J Donar (Sweden) O Jonsson	3	6
11	(Spain) S Casal (Spain) E Sánchez	2	6	3
(Sweden) S Edberg (Czech Republic) P Korda	6	3	6

Quarterfinals
3	(United States) P McEnroe (United States) J Stark	7	7
(Sweden) S Edberg (Czech Republic) P Korda	5	6

=== Bottom half ===
==== Section 3 ====
First round
WC	(Netherlands) R Krajicek (Netherlands) J Siemerink	4	7	6
WC	(United States) B Devening (Ukraine) D Poliakov	6	6	4
(Ecuador) A Gómez (Germany) C-U Steeb	6	5	6
(Sweden) H Holm (Norway) B-O Pedersen	2	7	4
(Argentina) P Albano (Spain) T Carbonell	5	1
(Croatia) G Ivanišević (Brazil) C Motta	7	6
(Brazil) L Mattar (Brazil) J Oncins	3	2
(United States) S Davis (United States) J Palmer	6	6

Second round
5	(Australia) J Fitzgerald (United States) T Kronemann	6	3
WC	(Netherlands) R Krajicek (Netherlands) J Siemerink	7	6
(Ecuador) A Gómez (Germany) C-U Steeb	6	6	2
12	(Australia) M Kratzmann (Australia) S Youl	4	7	6
14	(South Africa) G Muller (Spain) J Sánchez	4	6
(Croatia) G Ivanišević (Brazil) C Motta	6	7
(United States) S Davis (United States) J Palmer	6	2	6
4	(Canada) G Connell (United States) P Galbraith	2	6	3

Third round
WC	(Netherlands) R Krajicek (Netherlands) J Siemerink	6	7
12	(Australia) M Kratzmann (Australia) S Youl	1	6
(Croatia) G Ivanišević (Brazil) C Motta	7	6	4
(United States) S Davis (United States) J Palmer	5	7	6

Quarterfinals
WC	(Netherlands) R Krajicek (Netherlands) J Siemerink	7	3	6
(United States) S Davis (United States) J Palmer	6	6	3

==== Section 4 ====
First round
(United Kingdom) N Broad (South Africa) S Kruger	6	6	6
(Argentina) J Frana (Mexico) L Lavalle	3	7	3
(Germany) B Becker (Germany) P Kühnen	6	6	2
(United States) M Keil (United States) D Randall	4	7	6
(United States) B Garnett (United States) TJ Middleton	6	3	4
WC	(United States) P Annacone (United States) D Wheaton	3	6	6
(South Africa) M Barnard (Netherlands) T Kempers	6	6
(Australia) S Stolle (Australia) J Stoltenberg	7	7

Second round
8	(South Africa) W Ferreira (Germany) M Stich	3	4
(United Kingdom) N Broad (South Africa) S Kruger	6	6
(United States) M Keil (United States) D Randall	5	6	3
9	(Netherlands) J Eltingh (Netherlands) P Haarhuis	7	4	6
15	(United States) S Cannon (United States) S Melville	2	4
WC	(United States) P Annacone (United States) D Wheaton	6	6
(Australia) S Stolle (Australia) J Stoltenberg	7	6
2	(United States) K Jones (United States) R Leach	6	2

Third round
(United Kingdom) N Broad (South Africa) S Kruger	3	4
9	(Netherlands) J Eltingh (Netherlands) P Haarhuis	6	6
WC	(United States) P Annacone (United States) D Wheaton	6	6
(Australia) S Stolle (Australia) J Stoltenberg	3	3

Quarterfinals
9	(Netherlands) J Eltingh (Netherlands) P Haarhuis	7	4	6
WC	(United States) P Annacone (United States) D Wheaton	5	6	7

== Qualifying ==
=== Qualifying seeds ===
1. (France) Arnaud Boetsch / (France) Olivier Delaître (qualified)
2. (United States) Donald Johnson / (Venezuela) Maurice Ruah (qualified)
3. (Australia) Patrick Rafter / (New Zealand) Brett Steven (qualifying competition)
4. (United States) Brian Joelson / (Venezuela) Alfonso Mora (first round)

=== Qualifiers ===
1. (France) Arnaud Boetsch / (France) Olivier Delaître
2. (United States) Donald Johnson / (Venezuela) Maurice Ruah

=== Qualifying draw ===
==== First qualifier ====
First round
1	(France) Arnaud Boetsch (France) Olivier Delaître	6	7
(Brazil) Nelson Aerts (Brazil) José Daher	3	5
WC	(United States) David DiLucia (United States) David Witt	4	6	6
4	(United States) Brian Joelson (Venezuela) Alfonso Mora	6	3	4

Qualifying competition
1	(France) Arnaud Boetsch (France) Olivier Delaître	6	6
WC	(United States) David DiLucia (United States) David Witt	3	3

==== Second qualifier ====
First round
2	(United States) Donald Johnson (Venezuela) Maurice Ruah	6	4	7
(United States) Alex O'Brien (United States) Tom Mercer	3	6	5
(Sweden) Peter Lundgren (Sweden) Lars-Anders Wahlgren	4	3
3	(Australia) Patrick Rafter (New Zealand) Brett Steven	6	6

Qualifying competition
2	(United States) Donald Johnson (Venezuela) Maurice Ruah	6	7
3	(Australia) Patrick Rafter (New Zealand) Brett Steven	2	6
