= 1991 Kolynos Cup =

- Date: 28 October–3 November
- Edition: 1st
- Category: ATP World Series
- Draw: 32S / 16D
- Prize money: $ 147,500
- Surface: Hard / outdoor
- Location: Búzios, Brazil

Champions

Singles
- (Spain) Jordi Arrese

Doubles
- (Spain) Sergio Casal / (Spain) Emilio Sánchez
- ATP Buzios

The 1991 Kolynos Cup, also known as the Búzios Open, was a men's tennis tournament held in Búzios, Brazil and played on outdoor hardcourt. It was part of the World Series category of the 1991 ATP Tour. It was the inaugural edition of the tournament and took place from 28 October through 3 November 1991. Second-seeded Jordi Arrese won the singles title.

== Finals ==
=== Singles ===
(Spain) Jordi Arrese defeated (Brazil) Jaime Oncins 1–6, 6–4, 6–0

- It was Arrese's 2nd singles title of the year and the 4th of his career.

=== Doubles ===
(Spain) Sergio Casal / (Spain) Emilio Sánchez defeated (Argentina) Javier Frana / (Mexico) Leonardo Lavalle 4–6, 6–3, 6–4

- It was Casal's 4th doubles title of the year and the 35th of his career. It was Sánchez' 5th title of the year and the 38th of his career.
