= 1994 America's Red Clay Tennis Championships – Doubles =

Doubles
- 1994 America's Red Clay Tennis Championships

Final
- Champions: (South Africa) Lan Bale (New Zealand) Brett Steven
- Runners-up: (United States) Ken Flach (France) Stéphane Simian
- Score: 6–3, 7–5

Events
Singles	Doubles
- Delray Beach Open

Patrick McEnroe and Jonathan Stark were the defending champions, but did not participate this year.

Lan Bale and Brett Steven won in the final 6–3, 7–5, against Ken Flach and Stéphane Simian.

== Seeds ==
1. (Australia) Todd Woodbridge / (Australia) Mark Woodforde (semifinals)
2. (United States) Jim Grabb / (United States) Jared Palmer (first round)
3. (United States) Scott Davis / (United States) Todd Martin (first round)
4. (United States) Ken Flach / (France) Stéphane Simian (final)

== Draw ==
Key

- Q = Qualifier
- WC = Wild card
- LL = Lucky loser
- Alt = Alternate
- ITF = ITF entry
- PR = Protected ranking
- SR = Special ranking
- SE = Special exempt
- JE = Junior exempt
- JR = Junior Accelerator Programme entrant
- CO = College Accelerator Programme entrant
- NG = Next Gen Accelerator Program entrant
- w/o = Walkover
- r = Retired
- d = Defaulted

=== Draw ===
First round
1	(Australia) T Woodbridge (Australia) M Woodforde	6	7
(United States) B MacPhie (United States) B Shelton	4	6
(United Kingdom) N Broad (United States) G Van Emburgh	6	3	3
(United States) B Garnett (United States) A O'Brien	3	6	6
4	(United States) K Flach (France) S Simian	6	7	7
(Argentina) P Albano (Argentina) J Garat	7	6	6
(United States) P Annacone (United States) D Flach	6	7
Q	(Brazil) F Meligeni (Brazil) J Oncins	4	6
WC	(Sweden) N Kroon (Sweden) M Wilander	7	6
(United States) D Johnson (United States) T.J. Middleton	6	4
WC	(United States) I Baron (United States) T Ho	6	7
3	(United States) S Davis (United States) T Martin	4	5
(Australia) W Masur (United States) D Pate	6	7
(United States) M Briggs (United States) K Kinnear	3	6
(South Africa) L Bale (New Zealand) B Steven	5	6	7
2	(United States) J Grabb (United States) J Palmer	7	3	5

Quarterfinals
1	(Australia) T Woodbridge (Australia) M Woodforde	6	7
(United States) B Garnett (United States) A O'Brien	4	6
4	(United States) K Flach (France) S Simian	6	6
(United States) P Annacone (United States) D Flach	3	3
WC	(Sweden) N Kroon (Sweden) M Wilander	4	5
WC	(United States) I Baron (United States) T Ho	6	7
(Australia) W Masur (United States) D Pate	6	6
(South Africa) L Bale (New Zealand) B Steven	7	7

Semifinals
1	(Australia) T Woodbridge (Australia) M Woodforde	4	2
4	(United States) K Flach (France) S Simian	6	6
WC	(United States) I Baron (United States) T Ho	3	6
(South Africa) L Bale (New Zealand) B Steven	6	7

Final
4	(United States) K Flach (France) S Simian	3	5
(South Africa) L Bale (New Zealand) B Steven	6	7
