= 1991 Kolynos Cup – Doubles =

Doubles
- 1991 Kolynos Cup

Final
- Champions: (Spain) Sergio Casal (Spain) Emilio Sánchez
- Runners-up: (Argentina) Javier Frana (Mexico) Leonardo Lavalle
- Score: 4–6, 6–3, 6–4

Details
- Draw: 16 (1Q)
- Seeds: 4

Events
Singles	Doubles
- ATP Buzios

In the inaugural edition of the tournament, Sergio Casal and Emilio Sánchez won the title by defeating Javier Frana and Leonardo Lavalle 4–6, 6–3, 6–4 in the final.

== Seeds ==
1. (Spain) Sergio Casal / (Spain) Emilio Sánchez (champions)
2. (Netherlands) Paul Haarhuis / (Netherlands) Mark Koevermans (semifinals)
3. (Argentina) Javier Frana / (Mexico) Leonardo Lavalle (final)
4. (Argentina) Christian Miniussi / (Spain) Javier Sánchez (semifinals)

== Draw ==
Key

- Q = Qualifier
- WC = Wild card
- LL = Lucky loser
- Alt = Alternate
- ITF = ITF entry
- PR = Protected ranking
- SR = Special ranking
- SE = Special exempt
- JE = Junior exempt
- JR = Junior Accelerator Programme entrant
- CO = College Accelerator Programme entrant
- NG = Next Gen Accelerator Program entrant
- w/o = Walkover
- r = Retired
- d = Defaulted

=== Draw ===
First round
1	(Spain) S Casal (Spain) E Sánchez	6	7
(Brazil) R Acioly (Brazil) M Menezes	4	6
(Brazil) L Mattar (Venezuela) N Pereira	6	6
Q	(France) O Delaître (France) JP Fleurian	1	4
4	(Argentina) C Miniussi (Spain) J Sánchez	6	6
(United States) T Nelson (The Bahamas) R Smith	3	3
(Argentina) P Albano (Argentina) G Luza	5	1
(Mexico) J Lozano (Brazil) C Motta	7	6
(Peru) P Arraya (United States) S Cannon	5	6	2
(Netherlands) J Eltingh (United States) F Montana	7	1	6
(Spain) T Carbonell (Spain) F Roig	6	4
3	(Argentina) J Frana (Mexico) L Lavalle	7	6
(United States) B Garnett (United States) G Van Emburgh	6	6	4
(Spain) C Costa (Uruguay) D Pérez	2	7	6
(Ecuador) A Gómez (Brazil) J Oncins	4	1
2	(Netherlands) P Haarhuis (Netherlands) M Koevermans	6	6

Quarterfinals
1	(Spain) S Casal (Spain) E Sánchez	7	6
(Brazil) L Mattar (Venezuela) N Pereira	5	3
4	(Argentina) C Miniussi (Spain) J Sánchez	7	4	6
(Mexico) J Lozano (Brazil) C Motta	5	6	3
(Netherlands) J Eltingh (United States) F Montana	2	6	3
3	(Argentina) J Frana (Mexico) L Lavalle	6	3	6
(Spain) C Costa (Uruguay) D Pérez	3	3
2	(Netherlands) P Haarhuis (Netherlands) M Koevermans	6	6

Semifinals
1	(Spain) S Casal (Spain) E Sánchez	6	6
4	(Argentina) C Miniussi (Spain) J Sánchez	4	2
3	(Argentina) J Frana (Mexico) L Lavalle	7	4	6
2	(Netherlands) P Haarhuis (Netherlands) M Koevermans	6	6	2

Final
1	(Spain) S Casal (Spain) E Sánchez	4	6	6
3	(Argentina) J Frana (Mexico) L Lavalle	6	3	4
