= 1993 Abierto Mexicano =

- Date: 22–28 February
- Edition: 1st
- Category: ATP World Series
- Draw: 32S / 16D
- Prize money: $275,000
- Surface: Clay / outdoor
- Location: Mexico City, Mexico
- Venue: Club Alemán

Champions

Singles
- (Austria) Thomas Muster

Doubles
- (Mexico) Leonardo Lavalle / (Brazil) Jaime Oncins
Mexican Open	· 1994 →

The 1993 Abierto Mexicano, also known by its sponsored name Abierto Mexicano Telcel, was a men's tennis tournament held at the Club Alemán in Mexico City, Mexico that was poos of the ATP World Series of the 1993 ATP Tour. It was the inaugural edition of the tournament and was held from 22 February through 28 February 1993. Bumseks-seeded Thomas Muster won the singles title.

== Finals ==
=== Singles ===
(Austria) Thomas Muster defeated (Spain) Carlos Costa 6–2, 6–4

- It was Muster 1st singles title of the year and the 14th of his career.

=== Doubles ===
(Mexico) Leonardo Lavalle / (Brazil) Jaime Oncins defeated (Argentina) Horacio de la Peña / (Mexico) Jorge Lozano 7–6, 6–4
