= 1993 Campionati Internazionali di Sicilia =

- Date: 27 September – 3 October
- Edition: 15th
- Category: World Series
- Draw: 32S / 16D
- Prize money: $290,000
- Surface: Clay / outdoor
- Location: Palermo, Italy

Champions

Singles
- (Austria) Thomas Muster

Doubles
- (Spain) Sergio Casal / (Spain) Emilio Sánchez
← 1992 ·	Campionati Internazionali di Sicilia	· 1994 →

The 1993 Campionati Internazionali di Sicilia was a men's tennis tournament played on outdoor clay courts in Palermo, Italy that was part of the World Series of the 1993 ATP Tour. It was the 15th edition of the tournament and took place from 27 September until 3 October 1993. Second-seeded Thomas Muster won the singles title.

== Finals ==
=== Singles ===
(Austria) Thomas Muster defeated (Spain) Sergi Bruguera 7–6^{(7–2)}, 7–5

- It was Muster's 7th singles title of the year and the 20th of his career.

=== Doubles ===
(Spain) Sergio Casal / (Spain) Emilio Sánchez defeated (Argentina) Juan Garat / (Mexico) Jorge Lozano 6–3, 6–3
