= 1994 America's Red Clay Tennis Championships – Singles =

Singles
- 1994 America's Red Clay Tennis Championships

Final
- Champion: (Brazil) Luiz Mattar
- Runner-up: (Australia) Jamie Morgan
- Score: 6–4, 3–6, 6–3

Details
- Draw: 32
- Seeds: 8

Events
Singles	Doubles
- Delray Beach Open

Luiz Mattar defeated Jamie Morgan 6–4, 3–6, 6–3 to win the 1994 America's Red Clay Tennis Championships singles event. Todd Martin was the defending champion.

== Seeds ==
1. (United States) Todd Martin (first round)
2. (United States) Ivan Lendl (quarterfinals)
3. (United States) MaliVai Washington (second round)
4. (Australia) Wally Masur (first round)
5. (Switzerland) Jakob Hlasek (first round)
6. (Brazil) Luiz Mattar (champion)
7. (Australia) Jamie Morgan (final)
8. (Australia) Mark Woodforde (semifinals)

== Draw ==
Key

- Q = Qualifier
- WC = Wild card
- LL = Lucky loser
- Alt = Alternate
- ITF = ITF entry
- PR = Protected ranking
- SR = Special ranking
- SE = Special exempt
- JE = Junior exempt
- JR = Junior Accelerator Programme entrant
- CO = College Accelerator Programme entrant
- NG = Next Gen Accelerator Program entrant
- w/o = Walkover
- r = Retired
- d = Defaulted

=== Finals ===
Semifinals
7	(Australia) Jamie Morgan	6	5	7^{9}
(Brazil) Fernando Meligeni	3	7	6^{7}
6	(Brazil) Luiz Mattar	6	6
8	(Australia) Mark Woodforde	4	4

Finals
7	(Australia) Jamie Morgan	4	6	3
6	(Brazil) Luiz Mattar	6	3	6

=== Section 1 ===
First round
1	(United States) T Martin	7^{7}	4	4
(United States) J Palmer	6^{5}	6	6
(United States) D Flach	7^{7}	2	3
Q	(Argentina) M Ingaramo	6^{4}	6	6
Q	(Argentina) J Garat	7	7^{7}
(Australia) T Woodbridge	5	6^{4}
Q	(Brazil) J Oncins	6	4	4
7	(Australia) J Morgan	3	6	6
4	(Australia) W Masur	6^{6}	6^{4}
(France) S Simian	7^{8}	7^{7}
(Brazil) F Meligeni	6	6
WC	(United States) I Baron	4	4
WC	(United States) T Ho	3	3
(Argentina) F Davín	6	6
(Spain) F Clavet	7^{7}	7
5	(Switzerland) J Hlasek	6^{0}	5

Second round
(United States) J Palmer	6	6
(Argentina) M Ingaramo	1	2
(Argentina) J Garat	1	2
7	(Australia) J Morgan	6	6
(France) S Simian	2	2
(Brazil) F Meligeni	6	6
(Argentina) F Davín	7^{7}	1	6
(Spain) F Clavet	6^{5}	6	3

Quarterfinals
(United States) J Palmer	4	2
7	(Australia) J Morgan	6	6
(Brazil) F Meligeni	6	6
(Argentina) F Davín	3	2

Semifinals
7	(Australia) J Morgan	6	5	7^{9}
(Brazil) F Meligeni	3	7	6^{7}

=== Section 2 ===
First round
6	(Brazil) L Mattar	6	6
(United States) S Bryan	3	2
(Uruguay) M Filippini	6	3	r
(South Africa) G Stafford	2	6
(United States) B Shelton	6	4	7^{8}
Q	(United States) C Garner	2	6	6^{6}
(United States) C Adams	2	3
3	(United States) M Washington	6	6
8	(Australia) M Woodforde	6	6
(United States) J Grabb	2	3
WC	(United States) J Arias	3	6	6
(United States) A O'Brien	6	4	1
(Sweden) M Wilander	6	6
(New Zealand) B Steven	3	4
(United States) R Weiss	2	3
2	(United States) I Lendl	6	6

Second round
6	(Brazil) L Mattar	3	6	6
(South Africa) G Stafford	6	4	1
(United States) B Shelton	6	2	7
3	(United States) M Washington	3	6	5
8	(Australia) M Woodforde	6	6
WC	(United States) J Arias	3	4
(Sweden) M Wilander	3	6	5
2	(United States) I Lendl	6	4	7

Quarterfinals
6	(Brazil) L Mattar	6	6
(United States) B Shelton	4	4
8	(Australia) M Woodforde	6	6
2	(United States) I Lendl	3	4

Semifinals
6	(Brazil) L Mattar	6	6
8	(Australia) M Woodforde	4	4
