= 1993 International Tennis Championships – Doubles =

Doubles
- 1993 International Tennis Championships

Final
- Champions: (United States) Patrick McEnroe (United States) Jonathan Stark
- Runners-up: (United States) Paul Annacone (United States) Doug Flach
- Score: 6–4, 6–3

Events
Singles	Doubles
- Delray Beach Open

This was the first edition of the event.

Patrick McEnroe and Jonathan Stark won in the final 6–4, 6–3, against Paul Annacone and Doug Flach.

== Seeds ==
1. (United States) Patrick McEnroe / (United States) Jonathan Stark (champions)
2. (United States) Richey Reneberg / (United States) David Wheaton (quarterfinals)
3. (United States) Mike Briggs / (United States) Trevor Kronemann (quarterfinals)
4. (Argentina) Pablo Albano / (Spain) Tomás Carbonell (first round)

== Draw ==
Key

- Q = Qualifier
- WC = Wild card
- LL = Lucky loser
- Alt = Alternate
- ITF = ITF entry
- PR = Protected ranking
- SR = Special ranking
- SE = Special exempt
- JE = Junior exempt
- JR = Junior Accelerator Programme entrant
- CO = College Accelerator Programme entrant
- NG = Next Gen Accelerator Program entrant
- w/o = Walkover
- r = Retired
- d = Defaulted

=== Draw ===
First round
1	(United States) P McEnroe (United States) J Stark	7	6
(United States) B Devening (United States) M Keil	5	3
(New Zealand) K Evernden (United States) T Nelson	4	2
(United States) B Shelton (United States) T Witsken	6	6
4	(Argentina) P Albano (Spain) T Carbonell	3	3
(Australia) J Morgan (Australia) S Stolle	6	6
(The Bahamas) M Knowles (United States) A O'Brien	5	7	3
(Australia) R Fromberg (Australia) T Woodbridge	7	5	6
Q	(Mexico) O Fernández (Argentina) J Garat	6	6
(United States) J Sullivan (Sweden) N Utgren	3	3
WC	(United States) I Baron (United States) D Rostagno	4	6	2
3	(United States) M Briggs (United States) T Kronemann	6	4	6
(United States) P Annacone (United States) D Flach	6	6
(South Africa) R Deppe (United States) D Eisenman	4	4
WC	(United States) J Connors (United Kingdom) J Lloyd	1	6	3
2	(United States) R Reneberg (United States) D Wheaton	6	3	6

Quarterfinals
1	(United States) P McEnroe (United States) J Stark	7	6
(United States) B Shelton (United States) T Witsken	5	2
(Australia) J Morgan (Australia) S Stolle	2	7	4
(Australia) R Fromberg (Australia) T Woodbridge	6	5	6
Q	(Mexico) O Fernández (Argentina) J Garat	7	7
3	(United States) M Briggs (United States) T Kronemann	6	6
(United States) P Annacone (United States) D Flach	3	6	6
2	(United States) R Reneberg (United States) D Wheaton	6	1	3

Semifinals
1	(United States) P McEnroe (United States) J Stark	6	7
(Australia) R Fromberg (Australia) T Woodbridge	3	6
Q	(Mexico) O Fernández (Argentina) J Garat	6	6
(United States) P Annacone (United States) D Flach	7	7

Final
1	(United States) P McEnroe (United States) J Stark	6	6
(United States) P Annacone (United States) D Flach	4	3
