= 1990 ABN World Tennis Tournament =

- Date: 26 February – 4 March
- Edition: 18th
- Category: ATP World Series
- Draw: 32S / 16D
- Prize money: $450,000
- Surface: Carpet / indoor
- Location: Rotterdam, Netherlands
- Venue: Rotterdam Ahoy

Champions

Singles
- (United States) Brad Gilbert

Doubles
- (Mexico) Leonardo Lavalle / (Mexico) Jorge Lozano
- ABN World Tennis Tournament

The 1990 ABN World Tennis Tournament (known as such in 1990 for sponsorship reasons) was a men's tennis tournament played on indoor carpet courts. It was the 18th edition of the event known that year as the ABN World Tennis Tournament, and part of the ATP World Series of the 1990 ATP Tour. It took place at the Rotterdam Ahoy arena in Rotterdam, Netherlands, from 26 February through 4 March 1990. First-seeded Brad Gilbert won the singles title.

== Finals ==
=== Singles ===
(United States) Brad Gilbert defeated (Sweden) Jonas Svensson 6–1, 6–3

- It was Gilbert's first singles title of the year, and the 18th of his career.

=== Doubles ===
(Mexico) Leonardo Lavalle / (Mexico) Jorge Lozano defeated (Italy) Diego Nargiso / (Venezuela) Nicolas Pereira 6–3, 7–6

- It was Lavalle's first doubles title of the year, and the third of his career.
- It was Lozano's first doubles title of the year, and the seventh of his career.
