= 1992 Campionati Internazionali di Sicilia – Doubles =

Doubles
- 1992 Campionati Internazionali di Sicilia

Final
- Champions: (Sweden) Johan Donar (Sweden) Ola Jonsson
- Runners-up: (Argentina) Horacio de la Peña (Czechoslovakia) Vojtěch Flégl
- Score: 5–7, 6–3, 6–4

Events
Singles	Doubles
← 1991 ·	Campionati Internazionali di Sicilia	· 1993 →

Jacco Eltingh and Tom Kempers were the defending champions, but none competed this year.

Johan Donar and Ola Jonsson won the title by defeating Horacio de la Peña and Vojtěch Flégl 5–7, 6–3, 6–4 in the final.

== Seeds ==
1. (Spain) Sergio Casal / (Spain) Emilio Sánchez (semifinals)
2. (Argentina) Horacio de la Peña / (Czechoslovakia) Vojtěch Flégl (final)
3. (Italy) Cristian Brandi / (Spain) Tomás Carbonell (quarterfinals)
4. (Netherlands) Menno Oosting / (Croatia) Goran Prpić (first round)

== Draw ==
=== Key ===
- Q = Qualifier
- WC = Wild card
- LL = Lucky loser
- Alt = Alternate
- ITF = ITF entry
- PR = Protected ranking
- SR = Special ranking
- SE = Special exempt
- JE = Junior exempt
- JR = Junior Accelerator Programme entrant
- CO = College Accelerator Programme entrant
- NG = Next Gen Accelerator Program entrant
- w/o = Walkover
- r = Retired
- d = Defaulted

=== Draw ===
First round
1	(Spain) S Casal (Spain) E Sánchez	6	6
(Commonwealth of Independent States) D Poliakov (Czechoslovakia) T Zdražila	1	1
(Germany) M Naewie (Sweden) T Svantesson	3	6	3
Q	(France) G Bastié (Australia) J Ireland	6	1	6
4	(Netherlands) M Oosting (Croatia) G Prpić	6	2
(Sweden) J Donar (Sweden) O Jonsson	7	6
(Spain) S Bruguera (Spain) F Roig	6	4	7
(United States) M Jensen (United States) F Montana	4	6	5
(Ukraine) O Dolgopolov Sr. (Ukraine) A Medvedev	2	4
(United States) M Bauer (Denmark) M Mortensen	6	6
(Sweden) C Allgårdh (Sweden) T Nydahl	5	1
3	(Italy) C Brandi (Spain) T Carbonell	7	6
(Spain) F Clavet (Spain) C Costa	6	6
(Spain) J Burillo (Spain) J Sánchez	3	4
(South Africa) B Haygarth (Finland) O Rahnasto	6	4
2	(Argentina) H de la Peña (Czechoslovakia) V Flégl	7	6

Quarterfinals
1	(Spain) S Casal (Spain) E Sánchez	7	6
Q	(France) G Bastié (Australia) J Ireland	5	2
(Sweden) J Donar (Sweden) O Jonsson	5	6	6
(Spain) S Bruguera (Spain) F Roig	7	3	4
(United States) M Bauer (Denmark) M Mortensen	6	6
3	(Italy) C Brandi (Spain) T Carbonell	1	3
(Spain) F Clavet (Spain) C Costa	6	4	2
2	(Argentina) H de la Peña (Czechoslovakia) V Flégl	0	6	6

Semifinals
1	(Spain) S Casal (Spain) E Sánchez	6	6
(Sweden) J Donar (Sweden) O Jonsson	7	7
(United States) M Bauer (Denmark) M Mortensen	6	6	4
2	(Argentina) H de la Peña (Czechoslovakia) V Flégl	3	7	6

Final
(Sweden) J Donar (Sweden) O Jonsson	5	6	6
2	(Argentina) H de la Peña (Czechoslovakia) V Flégl	7	3	4
