= 1993 Campionati Internazionali di Sicilia – Singles =

Singles
- 1993 Campionati Internazionali di Sicilia

Final
- Champion: (Austria) Thomas Muster
- Runner-up: (Spain) Sergi Bruguera
- Score: 7–6^{(7–2)}, 7–5

Details
- Draw: 32 (2WC/4Q/2LL)
- Seeds: 8

Events
Singles	Doubles
← 1992 ·	Campionati Internazionali di Sicilia	· 1994 →

Sergi Bruguera was the defending champion, but lost in the final to Thomas Muster. The score was 7–6^{(7–2)}, 7–5.

== Seeds ==
1. (Spain) Sergi Bruguera (final)
2. (Austria) Thomas Muster (champion)
3. (Czech Republic) Karel Nováček (first round)
4. (Spain) Carlos Costa (quarterfinals, retired)
5. (Spain) Javier Sánchez (second round)
6. (Spain) Emilio Sánchez (first round)
7. (Brazil) Luiz Mattar (quarterfinals)
8. (Spain) Alberto Berasategui (first round)

== Draw ==
=== Key ===
- Q = Qualifier
- WC = Wild card
- LL = Lucky loser
- Alt = Alternate
- ITF = ITF entry
- PR = Protected ranking
- SR = Special ranking
- SE = Special exempt
- JE = Junior exempt
- JR = Junior Accelerator Programme entrant
- CO = College Accelerator Programme entrant
- NG = Next Gen Accelerator Program entrant
- w/o = Walkover
- r = Retired
- d = Defaulted

=== Finals ===
Semifinals
1/WC	(Spain) Sergi Bruguera	6	6
LL	(Spain) Federico Sánchez	1	3
(Italy) Andrea Gaudenzi	5	0
2	(Austria) Thomas Muster	7	6

Final
1/WC	(Spain) Sergi Bruguera	6^{2}	5
2	(Austria) Thomas Muster	7^{7}	7

=== Top half ===
First round
1/WC	(Spain) S Bruguera	6^{3}	6	6
(Spain) J Arrese	7^{7}	2	2
LL	(Netherlands) M Koevermans	2	6	4
(Haiti) R Agénor	6	4	6
Q	(France) F Fontang	6^{2}	7^{7}	7
(Argentina) F Davín	7^{7}	6^{4}	5
Q	(Spain) J Gisbert Schultze	4	6	7^{7}
8	(Spain) A Berasategui	6	2	6^{2}
4	(Spain) C Costa	6	6
(Spain) T Carbonell	2	4
WC	(Italy) P Canè	6	6
(Austria) G Schaller	3	2
(Germany) B Karbacher	6^{2}	2
(Czech Republic) D Vacek	7^{7}	6
LL	(Spain) F Sánchez	4	6	6
6	(Spain) E Sánchez	6	3	2

Second round
1/WC	(Spain) S Bruguera	6	6
(Haiti) R Agénor	1	4
Q	(France) F Fontang	6	7^{8}
Q	(Spain) J Gisbert Schultze	4	6^{6}
4	(Spain) C Costa	2	6	6
WC	(Italy) P Canè	6	4	4
(Czech Republic) D Vacek	6	5	1
LL	(Spain) F Sánchez	3	7	6

Quarterfinals
1/WC	(Spain) S Bruguera	5
Q	(France) F Fontang	2^{r}
4	(Spain) C Costa	4^{r}
LL	(Spain) F Sánchez	6

Semifinals
1/WC	(Spain) S Bruguera	6	6
LL	(Spain) F Sánchez	1	3

=== Bottom half ===
First round
5	(Spain) J Sánchez	6	6
(Uruguay) M Filippini	4	4
Q	(Italy) P Pennisi	1	1
(Spain) À Corretja	6	6
(Spain) F Clavet	1	3
(Italy) A Gaudenzi	6	6
WC	(Italy) S Pescosolido	1	6	6
3	(Czech Republic) K Nováček	6	3	4
7	(Brazil) L Mattar	6	2	6
(Argentina) H de la Peña	2	6	4
(Spain) J Burillo	6	6
Q	(Italy) D Nargiso	3	4
(Italy) R Furlan	6	7
(Brazil) J Oncins	4	5
(Argentina) R Azar	1	3
2	(Austria) T Muster	6	6

Second round
5	(Spain) J Sánchez	1	2
(Spain) À Corretja	6	6
(Italy) A Gaudenzi	4	6	7
WC	(Italy) S Pescosolido	6	3	5
7	(Brazil) L Mattar	6^{5}	7^{7}	6
(Spain) J Burillo	7^{7}	6^{5}	1
(Italy) R Furlan	1	6	3
2	(Austria) T Muster	6	4	6

Quarterfinals
(Spain) À Corretja	6^{4}	6	4
(Italy) A Gaudenzi	7^{7}	2	6
7	(Brazil) L Mattar	6^{4}	1
2	(Austria) T Muster	7^{7}	6

Semifinals
(Italy) A Gaudenzi	5	0
2	(Austria) T Muster	7	6
