= 1991 Kolynos Cup – Singles =

Singles
- 1991 Kolynos Cup

Final
- Champion: (Spain) Jordi Arrese
- Runner-up: (Brazil) Jaime Oncins
- Score: 1–6, 6–4, 6–0

Details
- Draw: 32 (3WC/4Q/1SE)
- Seeds: 8

Events
Singles	Doubles
- ATP Buzios

In the inaugural edition of the tournament, Jordi Arrese won the title by defeating Jaime Oncins 1–6, 6–4, 6–0 in the final.

== Seeds ==
1. (Spain) Emilio Sánchez (first round)
2. (Spain) Jordi Arrese (champion)
3. (Spain) Javier Sánchez (semifinals)
4. (Austria) Thomas Muster (quarterfinals)
5. (Netherlands) Paul Haarhuis (second round)
6. (Spain) Francisco Clavet (quarterfinals)
7. (France) Olivier Delaître (second round)
8. (Argentina) Guillermo Pérez Roldán (quarterfinals)

== Draw ==
Key

- Q = Qualifier
- WC = Wild card
- LL = Lucky loser
- Alt = Alternate
- ITF = ITF entry
- PR = Protected ranking
- SR = Special ranking
- SE = Special exempt
- JE = Junior exempt
- JR = Junior Accelerator Programme entrant
- CO = College Accelerator Programme entrant
- NG = Next Gen Accelerator Program entrant
- w/o = Walkover
- r = Retired
- d = Defaulted

=== Finals ===
Semifinals
(Brazil) Jaime Oncins	6	6
SE	(Spain) Francisco Roig	4	4
3	(Spain) Javier Sánchez	2	6^{12}
2	(Spain) Jordi Arrese	6	7^{14}

Final
(Brazil) Jaime Oncins	6	4	0
2	(Spain) Jordi Arrese	1	6	6

=== Top half ===
First round
1	(Spain) E Sánchez	6^{5}	2
(Germany) M Zoecke	7^{7}	6
Q	(Canada) D Nestor	6	6
WC	(Brazil) D Marcelino	4	2
(France) JP Fleurian	6^{2}	3
(Brazil) J Oncins	7^{7}	6
Q	(Estonia) A Võsand	1	6	2
7	(France) O Delaître	6	4	6
4	(Austria) T Muster	6	7^{10}
(Netherlands) M Koevermans	3	6^{8}
(Ecuador) A Gómez	7	6
(Netherlands) J Eltingh	5	2
SE	(Spain) F Roig	6	6
Q	(Venezuela) M Ruah	2	3
(Brazil) L Mattar	6^{0}	3
5	(Netherlands) P Haarhuis	7^{7}	6

Second round
(Germany) M Zoecke	6	6
Q	(Canada) D Nestor	3	2
(Brazil) J Oncins	7^{7}	6
7	(France) O Delaître	6^{5}	4
4	(Austria) T Muster	6	6
(Ecuador) A Gómez	4	4
SE	(Spain) F Roig	6	6
5	(Netherlands) P Haarhuis	2	1

Quarterfinals
(Germany) M Zoecke	4	2
(Brazil) J Oncins	6	6
4	(Austria) T Muster	6	3	3
SE	(Spain) F Roig	4	6	6

Semifinals
(Brazil) J Oncins	6	6
SE	(Spain) F Roig	4	4

=== Bottom half ===
First round
6	(Spain) F Clavet	6	6
(Belgium) E Masso	0	1
WC	(Brazil) F Roese	7	7^{10}
(Germany) P Baur	5	6^{8}
Q	(Venezuela) N Pereira	5	3
(Mexico) L Herrera	7	6
(Spain) T Carbonell	4	4
3	(Spain) J Sánchez	6	6
8	(Argentina) G Pérez Roldán	6	6
(Argentina) J Frana	4	0
(Belgium) B Wuyts	6^{7}	6	2
(Spain) C Costa	7^{9}	4	6
(Argentina) G Markus	6	4	4
WC	(Brazil) J Daher	4	6	6
(Japan) S Matsuoka	1	3
2	(Spain) J Arrese	6	6

Second round
6	(Spain) F Clavet	6	6
WC	(Brazil) F Roese	2	2
(Mexico) L Herrera	6	2	5
3	(Spain) J Sánchez	2	6	7
8	(Argentina) G Pérez Roldán	6	6^{5}	6
(Spain) C Costa	4	7^{7}	1
WC	(Brazil) J Daher	6^{1}	6	4
2	(Spain) J Arrese	7^{7}	1	6

Quarterfinals
6	(Spain) F Clavet	7^{7}	4	2
3	(Spain) J Sánchez	6^{4}	6	6
8	(Argentina) G Pérez Roldán	7^{8}	5	1^{r}
2	(Spain) J Arrese	6^{6}	7	3

Semifinals
3	(Spain) J Sánchez	2	6^{12}
2	(Spain) J Arrese	6	7^{14}
