= 1990 ABN World Tennis Tournament – Singles =

Singles
- 1990 ABN World Tennis Tournament

Final
- Champion: (United States) Brad Gilbert
- Runner-up: (Sweden) Jonas Svensson
- Score: 6–1, 6–3

Details
- Draw: 32
- Seeds: 8

Events
Singles	Doubles
- ABN World Tennis Tournament

Jakob Hlasek was the defending champion, but lost in the semifinals to seventh seed Jonas Svensson.
Brad Gilbert won the title, defeating Jonas Svensson 6–1, 6–3, in the final.

== Seeds ==
1. (United States) Brad Gilbert (champion)
2. (Argentina) Alberto Mancini (first round)
3. (France) Yannick Noah (first round)
4. (West Germany) Carl-Uwe Steeb (second round)
5. (Sweden) Magnus Gustafsson (quarterfinals)
6. (Switzerland) Jakob Hlasek (semifinals)
7. (Sweden) Jonas Svensson (final)
8. (Israel) Amos Mansdorf (quarterfinals)

== Draw ==
Key

- Q = Qualifier
- WC = Wild card
- LL = Lucky loser
- Alt = Alternate
- ITF = ITF entry
- PR = Protected ranking
- SR = Special ranking
- SE = Special exempt
- JE = Junior exempt
- JR = Junior Accelerator Programme entrant
- CO = College Accelerator Programme entrant
- NG = Next Gen Accelerator Program entrant
- w/o = Walkover
- r = Retired
- d = Defaulted

=== Finals ===
Semifinals
1	(United States) Brad Gilbert	6	6
(Denmark) Michael Tauson	3	3
6	(Switzerland) Jakob Hlasek	4	5
7	(Sweden) Jonas Svensson	6	7

Final
1	(United States) Brad Gilbert	6	6
7	(Sweden) Jonas Svensson	1	3

=== Top half ===
First round
1	(United States) B Gilbert	7	4	6
(Soviet Union) A Cherkasov	5	6	4
(Italy) O Camporese	6	6
(Australia) R Fromberg	4	2
WC	(Australia) J Fitzgerald	6^{3}	3
(Sweden) C Bergström	7^{7}	6
(Sweden) A Järryd	2	4
8	(Israel) A Mansdorf	6	6
3	(France) Y Noah	2	6^{4}
(Netherlands) P Haarhuis	6	7^{7}
(Netherlands) M Schapers	6^{6}	5
(Denmark) M Tauson	7^{8}	7
(United Kingdom) J Bates	1	1
WC	(Socialist Federal Republic of Yugoslavia) S Živojinović	6	6
(France) J Potier	5	2
5	(Sweden) M Gustafsson	7	6

Second round
1	(United States) B Gilbert	6	6
(Italy) O Camporese	3	3
(Sweden) C Bergström	6	1	1
8	(Israel) A Mansdorf	4	6	6
(Netherlands) P Haarhuis	6	3	6^{10}
(Denmark) M Tauson	2	6	7^{12}
WC	(Socialist Federal Republic of Yugoslavia) S Živojinović	3	3
5	(Sweden) M Gustafsson	6	6

Quarterfinals
1	(United States) B Gilbert	6	7^{8}
8	(Israel) A Mansdorf	1	6^{6}
(Denmark) M Tauson	6	1	7^{7}
5	(Sweden) M Gustafsson	3	6	6^{4}

Semifinals
1	(United States) B Gilbert	6	6
(Denmark) M Tauson	3	3

=== Bottom half ===
First round
6	(Switzerland) J Hlasek	7^{11}	7^{7}
(West Germany) E Jelen	6^{9}	6^{5}
(Venezuela) N Pereira	6	6
(Netherlands) M Koevermans	4	2
Q	(United States) L Jensen	4	4
(Austria) A Antonitsch	6	6
Q	(France) C Pioline	4	4
4	(West Germany) C-U Steeb	6	6
7	(Sweden) J Svensson	7^{7}	6
(Netherlands) T Nijssen	6^{1}	1
(Czechoslovakia) K Nováček	7^{7}	7^{7}
Q	(Sweden) P Nyborg	6^{3}	6^{4}
(Sweden) L-A Wahlgren	4	1
WC	(Finland) A Rahunen	6	6
Q	(Sweden) T Högstedt	6^{6}	6	6
2	(Argentina) A Mancini	7^{8}	4	2

Second round
6	(Switzerland) J Hlasek	6	6
(Venezuela) N Pereira	2	3
(Austria) A Antonitsch	6	4	6
4	(West Germany) C-U Steeb	1	6	3
7	(Sweden) J Svensson	7^{8}	7
(Czechoslovakia) K Nováček	6^{6}	5
WC	(Finland) A Rahunen	2	6^{6}
Q	(Sweden) T Högstedt	6	7^{8}

Quarterfinals
6	(Switzerland) J Hlasek	7	6
(Austria) A Antonitsch	5	1
7	(Sweden) J Svensson	6	6^{5}	7
Q	(Sweden) T Högstedt	3	7^{7}	5

Semifinals
6	(Switzerland) J Hlasek	4	5
7	(Sweden) J Svensson	6	7
