= 1992 Campionati Internazionali di Sicilia – Singles =

Singles
- 1992 Campionati Internazionali di Sicilia

Final
- Champion: (Spain) Sergi Bruguera
- Runner-up: (Spain) Emilio Sánchez
- Score: 6–1, 6–3

Details
- Draw: 32 (3WC/4Q)
- Seeds: 8

Events
Singles	Doubles
← 1991 ·	Campionati Internazionali di Sicilia	· 1993 →

Frédéric Fontang was the defending champion, but lost in the quarterfinals to Sergi Bruguera.

Bruguera won the title by defeating his compatriot Emilio Sánchez 6–1, 6–3 in the final.

== Seeds ==
1. (Spain) Carlos Costa (second round)
2. (Spain) Sergi Bruguera (champions)
3. (Spain) Emilio Sánchez (final)
4. (Spain) Francisco Clavet (semifinals)
5. (Spain) Jordi Arrese (first round)
6. (Ukraine) Andrei Medvedev (first round)
7. (France) Fabrice Santoro (second round)
8. (Spain) Javier Sánchez (second round)

== Draws ==
=== Key ===
- Q = Qualifier
- WC = Wild card
- LL = Lucky loser
- Alt = Alternate
- ITF = ITF entry
- PR = Protected ranking
- SR = Special ranking
- SE = Special exempt
- JE = Junior exempt
- JR = Junior Accelerator Programme entrant
- CO = College Accelerator Programme entrant
- NG = Next Gen Accelerator Program entrant
- w/o = Walkover
- r = Retired
- d = Defaulted

=== Finals ===
Semifinals
(Italy) Renzo Furlan	3	6	4
3	(Spain) Emilio Sánchez	6	2	6
4	(Spain) Francisco Clavet	1	4
2	(Spain) Sergi Bruguera	6	6

Final
3	(Spain) Emilio Sánchez	1	3
2	(Spain) Sergi Bruguera	6	6

=== Top half ===
First round
1	(Spain) C Costa	4	6	6
(Sweden) L Jönsson	6	1	2
(Italy) R Furlan	6	6
(Germany) M Naewie	4	4
(Argentina) G Pérez Roldán	6	6
WC	(Australia) P Kilderry	3	2
(France) R Gilbert	6	1	4
8	(Spain) J Sánchez	4	6	6
3	(Spain) E Sánchez	6	6
Q	(Italy) M Valeri	4	1
(France) T Champion	6	6
(Spain) F Roig	4	2
(Argentina) G Markus	6	5	3
(Spain) T Carbonell	4	7	6
(Spain) G López	6	6
5	(Spain) J Arrese	4	3

Second round
1	(Spain) C Costa	5	4
(Italy) R Furlan	7	6
(Argentina) G Pérez Roldán	6	4	6
8	(Spain) J Sánchez	4	6	4
3	(Spain) E Sánchez	5	7^{7}	6
(France) T Champion	7	6^{5}	4
(Spain) T Carbonell	6	6
(Spain) G López	1	1

Quarterfinals
(Italy) R Furlan	6	6
(Argentina) G Pérez Roldán	4	4
3	(Spain) E Sánchez	6	6
(Spain) T Carbonell	2	3

Semifinals
(Italy) R Furlan	3	6	4
3	(Spain) E Sánchez	6	2	6

=== Bottom half ===
First round
6	(Ukraine) A Medvedev	7^{7}	3	3
WC	(Italy) P Canè	6^{4}	6	6
(Austria) H Skoff	6	7^{8}
Q	(Spain) JA Conde	3	6^{6}
(Uruguay) M Filippini	6	2	5
(Croatia) G Prpić	4	6	7
WC	(Italy) C Pistolesi	1	6	3
4	(Spain) F Clavet	6	1	6
7	(France) F Santoro	6	6
(Belgium) B Wuyts	3	3
(France) F Fontang	6	6
(Argentina) F Davín	3	3
Q	(Italy) M Cierro	2	4
(Germany) B Karbacher	6	6
Q	(Spain) J Burillo	2	6	2
2	(Spain) S Bruguera	6	2	6

Second round
WC	(Italy) P Canè	2	1
(Austria) H Skoff	6	6
(Croatia) G Prpić	4	3
4	(Spain) F Clavet	6	6
7	(France) F Santoro	4	4
(France) F Fontang	6	6
(Germany) B Karbacher	3	1
2	(Spain) S Bruguera	6	6

Quarterfinals
(Austria) H Skoff	1	1
4	(Spain) F Clavet	6	6
(France) F Fontang	2	2
2	(Spain) S Bruguera	6	6

Semifinals
4	(Spain) F Clavet	1	4
2	(Spain) S Bruguera	6	6
