= 1991 Riklis Classic – Doubles =

Doubles
- 1991 Riklis Classic

Final
- Champions: (Czechoslovakia) David Rikl (Netherlands) Michiel Schapers
- Runners-up: (Argentina) Javier Frana (Mexico) Leonardo Lavalle
- Score: 6–2, 6–7, 6–3

Details
- Draw: 16
- Seeds: 4

Events
Singles	Doubles
← 1990 ·	Riklis Classic	· 1992 →

Nduka Odizor and Christo van Rensburg were the defending champions, but did not participate together this year. Odizor partnered Bryan Shelton, losing in the semifinals. van Rensburg partnered John-Laffnie de Jager, losing in the first round.

David Rikl and Michiel Schapers won the title, defeating Javier Frana and Leonardo Lavalle 6–2, 6–7, 6–3 in the final.

== Seeds ==
1. (Argentina) Javier Frana / (Mexico) Leonardo Lavalle (final)
2. (Czechoslovakia) David Rikl / (Netherlands) Michiel Schapers (champions)
3. (Nigeria) Nduka Odizor / (United States) Bryan Shelton (semifinals)
4. (United Kingdom) Andrew Castle / (Kenya) Paul Wekesa (first round)

== Draw ==
=== Key ===
- Q = Qualifier
- WC = Wild card
- LL = Lucky loser
- Alt = Alternate
- SE = Special exempt
- PR = Protected ranking
- ITF = ITF entry
- JE = Junior exempt
- w/o = Walkover
- r = Retired
- d = Defaulted
- SR = Special ranking

=== Draw ===
First round
1	(Argentina) J Frana (Mexico) L Lavalle	6	6	6
(Netherlands) J Eltingh (Denmark) M Mortensen	4	7	3
WC	(Soviet Union) A Cherkasov (Argentina) M Jaite	4	6	2
(Sweden) H Holm (Sweden) N Holm	6	3	6
3	(Nigeria) N Odizor (United States) B Shelton	6	6
(Austria) A Antonitsch (Israel) G Bloom	3	4
(Netherlands) M Oosting (Finland) O Rahnasto	3	4
Q	(South Africa) M Barnard (South Africa) M Ondruska	6	6
(Soviet Union) Ģ Dzelde (United States) D Randall	4	6	6
(Sweden) P Henricsson (Sweden) O Jonsson	6	2	7
(United States) D Eisenman (United States) T Scherman	6	2	6
4	(United Kingdom) A Castle (Kenya) P Wekesa	3	6	2
(Czechoslovakia) J Čihák (Czechoslovakia) T Anzari	1	7	1
(New Zealand) S Guy (New Zealand) B Steven	6	6	6
(South Africa) J-L de Jager (South Africa) C van Rensburg	6	3	6
2	(Czechoslovakia) D Rikl (Netherlands) M Schapers	1	6	7

Quarterfinals
1	(Argentina) J Frana (Mexico) L Lavalle	7	6
(Sweden) H Holm (Sweden) N Holm	5	4
3	(Nigeria) N Odizor (United States) B Shelton	6	6
Q	(South Africa) M Barnard (South Africa) M Ondruska	4	3
(Sweden) P Henricsson (Sweden) O Jonsson	7	7
(United States) D Eisenman (United States) T Scherman	6	6
(New Zealand) S Guy (New Zealand) B Steven	3	6	2
2	(Czechoslovakia) D Rikl (Netherlands) M Schapers	6	3	6

Semifinals
1	(Argentina) J Frana (Mexico) L Lavalle	7	6
3	(Nigeria) N Odizor (United States) B Shelton	6	3
(Sweden) P Henricsson (Sweden) O Jonsson	7	3	3
2	(Czechoslovakia) D Rikl (Netherlands) M Schapers	5	6	6

Final
1	(Argentina) J Frana (Mexico) L Lavalle	2	7	3
2	(Czechoslovakia) D Rikl (Netherlands) M Schapers	6	6	6
