= 1991 Riklis Classic – Singles =

Singles
- 1991 Riklis Classic

Final
- Champion: (Mexico) Leonardo Lavalle
- Runner-up: (South Africa) Christo van Rensburg
- Score: 6–2, 3–6, 6–3

Details
- Draw: 32
- Seeds: 8

Events
Singles	Doubles
← 1990 ·	Riklis Classic	· 1992 →

Andrei Chesnokov was the defending champion, but did not participate this year.

Leonardo Lavalle won the tournament, beating Christo van Rensburg in the final, 6–2, 3–6, 6–3.

== Seeds ==
1. (Soviet Union) Andrei Cherkasov (quarterfinals)
2. (Argentina) Martín Jaite (second round)
3. (Netherlands) Mark Koevermans (first round)
4. (Israel) Amos Mansdorf (first round)
5. (France) Olivier Delaître (quarterfinals)
6. (Sweden) Lars Jonsson (first round)
7. (Argentina) Javier Frana (second round)
8. (Netherlands) Jacco Eltingh (first round)

== Draw ==
=== Key ===
- Q = Qualifier
- WC = Wild card
- LL = Lucky loser
- Alt = Alternate
- SE = Special exempt
- PR = Protected ranking
- ITF = ITF entry
- JE = Junior exempt
- w/o = Walkover
- r = Retired
- d = Defaulted
- SR = Special ranking

=== Finals ===
Semifinals
Q	(Mexico) Leonardo Lavalle	6	7^{7}
(United States) Bryan Shelton	4	6^{5}
(South Africa) Christo van Rensburg	6	2	6
(Israel) Gilad Bloom	3	6	3

Final
Q	(Mexico) Leonardo Lavalle	6	3	6
(South Africa) Christo van Rensburg	2	6	3

=== Top half ===
First round
1	(Soviet Union) A Cherkasov	7	6
WC	(Israel) S Perkiss	5	4
(United States) C Adams	6	6
Q	(Israel) O Sela	3	4
(Canada) C Pridham	6	6
(Canada) M Wostenholme	4	3
Q	(Mexico) L Lavalle	4	6	6
8	(Netherlands) J Eltingh	6	3	4
3	(Netherlands) M Koevermans	1	0
(Sweden) J Apell	6	6
Q	(Sweden) P Nyborg	6	6
WC	(Israel) O Weinberg	2	4
(Czechoslovakia) V Roubíček	3	6^{4}
WC	(Israel) R Weidenfeld	6	7^{7}
(United States) B Shelton	6	7^{7}
6	(Sweden) L Jonsson	3	6^{1}

Second round
1	(Soviet Union) A Cherkasov	6	7^{9}
(United States) C Adams	3	6^{7}
(Canada) C Pridham	4	6^{3}
Q	(Mexico) L Lavalle	6	7^{7}
(Sweden) J Apell	5	6	4
Q	(Sweden) P Nyborg	7	4	6
WC	(Israel) R Weidenfeld	3	1
(United States) B Shelton	6	6

Quarterfinals
1	(Soviet Union) A Cherkasov	5	7^{7}	3
Q	(Mexico) L Lavalle	7	6^{5}	6
Q	(Sweden) P Nyborg	6^{4}	4
(United States) B Shelton	7^{7}	6

Semifinals
Q	(Mexico) L Lavalle	6	7^{7}
(United States) B Shelton	4	6^{5}

=== Bottom half ===
First round
5	(France) O Delaître	6	4	6
(New Zealand) B Steven	2	6	1
(Czechoslovakia) T Anzari	6	4	3
(Czechoslovakia) D Rikl	2	6	6
(Canada) M Laurendeau	6	4	4
(Sweden) H Holm	1	6	6
(South Africa) C van Rensburg	6	6
4	(Israel) A Mansdorf	3	2
7	(Argentina) J Frana	6	6
(Netherlands) M Schapers	3	3
Q	(Sweden) J Carlsson	3	6	6
(Soviet Union) V Gabrichidze	6	4	2
(Czechoslovakia) M Střelba	3	2
(Israel) G Bloom	6	6
(Austria) A Antonitsch	3	1
2	(Argentina) M Jaite	6	6

Second round
5	(France) O Delaître	6	7
(Czechoslovakia) D Rikl	3	5
(Sweden) H Holm	6^{6}	1
(South Africa) C van Rensburg	7^{8}	6
7	(Argentina) J Frana	3	4
Q	(Sweden) J Carlsson	6	6
(Israel) G Bloom	6	6
2	(Argentina) M Jaite	3	4

Quarterfinals
5	(France) O Delaître	3	3
(South Africa) C van Rensburg	6	6
Q	(Sweden) J Carlsson	3	5
(Israel) G Bloom	6	7

Semifinals
(South Africa) C van Rensburg	6	2	6
(Israel) G Bloom	3	6	3
