= 1992 Campionati Internazionali di Sicilia =

- Date: 28 September – 4 October
- Edition: 14th
- Category: World Series
- Draw: 32S / 16D
- Prize money: $285,000
- Surface: Clay / outdoor
- Location: Palermo, Italy

Champions

Singles
- (Spain) Sergi Bruguera

Doubles
- (Sweden) Johan Donar / (Sweden) Ola Jonsson
- Campionati Internazionali di Sicilia

The 1992 Campionati Internazionali di Sicilia was a men's tennis tournament played on outdoor clay courts in Palermo, Italy that was part of the World Series of the 1992 ATP Tour. It was the 14th edition of the tournament and took place from 28 September until 4 October 1992. Second-seeded Sergi Bruguera won the singles title.

== Finals ==
=== Singles ===
(Spain) Sergi Bruguera defeated (Spain) Emilio Sánchez 6–1, 6–3

- It was Bruguera's 3rd singles title of the year and the 6th of his career.

=== Doubles ===
(Sweden) Johan Donar / (Sweden) Ola Jonsson defeated (Argentina) Horacio de la Peña / (Czechoslovakia) Vojtěch Flégl 5–7, 6–3, 6–4
