= 1993 International Tennis Championships – Singles =

Singles
- 1993 International Tennis Championships

Final
- Champion: (United States) Todd Martin
- Runner-up: (United States) David Wheaton
- Score: 6–3, 6–4

Details
- Draw: 32
- Seeds: 8

Events
Singles	Doubles
- Delray Beach Open

Todd Martin defeated David Wheaton 6–3, 6–4 and won the 1993 International Tennis Championships singles event.

== Seeds ==
1. (Australia) Wally Masur (semifinals)
2. (United States) David Wheaton (finalist)
3. (United States) Todd Martin' (champion)
4. (United States) Richey Reneberg (second round)
5. (United States) Jonathan Stark (second round)
6. (Mexico) Luis Herrera (second round)
7. (United States) Derrick Rostagno (first round)
8. (United States) Jeff Tarango (second round)

== Draw ==
Key

- Q = Qualifier
- WC = Wild card
- LL = Lucky loser
- Alt = Alternate
- ITF = ITF entry
- PR = Protected ranking
- SR = Special ranking
- SE = Special exempt
- JE = Junior exempt
- JR = Junior Accelerator Programme entrant
- CO = College Accelerator Programme entrant
- NG = Next Gen Accelerator Program entrant
- w/o = Walkover
- r = Retired
- d = Defaulted

=== Finals ===
Semifinals
1	(Australia) Wally Masur	4	6^{2}
3	(United States) Todd Martin	6	7^{7}
(United States) Aaron Krickstein	2	6	4
2	(United States) David Wheaton	6	4	6

Finals
3	(United States) Todd Martin	6	6
2	(United States) David Wheaton	3	4

=== Section 1 ===
First round
1	(Australia) W Masur	7	6
(United States) C Adams	5	2
(Austria) G Schaller	6	6
(Australia) J Morgan	4	3
WC	(United States) J Connors	5	5
(United States) P McEnroe	7	7
LL	(United States) C Garner	4	0
8	(United States) J Tarango	6	6
3	(United States) T Martin	6	6
Q	(Spain) A Mancisidor	3	4
(United States) T Witsken	6	3	0
(Spain) T Carbonell	2	6	6
(United States) B Shelton	7^{7}	6
(Argentina) R Azar	6^{5}	4
(France) T Champion	3	4
6	(Mexico) L Herrera	6	6

Second round
1	(Australia) W Masur	6	4	6
(Austria) G Schaller	4	6	3
(United States) P McEnroe	6	6
8	(United States) J Tarango	1	4
3	(United States) T Martin	6	6
(Spain) T Carbonell	2	1
(United States) B Shelton	7	6
6	(Mexico) L Herrera	5	1

Quarterfinals
1	(Australia) W Masur	6	6
(United States) P McEnroe	3	2
3	(United States) T Martin	6	6
(United States) B Shelton	3	4

Semifinals
1	(Australia) W Masur	4	6^{2}
3	(United States) T Martin	6	7^{7}

=== Section 2 ===
First round
5	(United States) J Stark	6	6
(Australia) R Fromberg	0	4
(Czech Republic) S Doseděl	3	3
(United States) A Krickstein	6	6
Q	(Sweden) M Pernfors	4	6	6
WC	(Ecuador) A Gómez	6	3	4
Q	(United States) B Dunn	3	4
4	(United States) R Reneberg	6	6
7	(United States) D Rostagno	6^{5}	1
(United States) A O'Brien	7^{7}	6
Q	(Sweden) J Carlsson	6	6
WC	(United States) I Baron	4	2
(Australia) S Stolle	3	4
(Australia) T Woodbridge	6	6
(Spain) MA Gorriz	6^{5}	3
2	(United States) D Wheaton	7^{7}	6

Second round
5	(United States) J Stark	2	4
(United States) A Krickstein	6	6
Q	(Sweden) M Pernfors	6	6
4	(United States) R Reneberg	4	2
(United States) A O'Brien	7^{7}	7
Q	(Sweden) J Carlsson	6^{4}	5
(Australia) T Woodbridge	6	4	0
2	(United States) D Wheaton	2	6	6

Quarterfinals
(United States) A Krickstein	2	6	6
Q	(Sweden) M Pernfors	6	1	2
(United States) A O'Brien	6	4	0
2	(United States) D Wheaton	4	6	6

Semifinals
(United States) A Krickstein	2	6	4
2	(United States) D Wheaton	6	4	6
