= 1990 ABN World Tennis Tournament – Doubles =

Doubles
- 1990 ABN World Tennis Tournament
- 1989 Champions: (Czechoslovakia) Miloslav Mečíř (Czechoslovakia) Milan Šrejber

Final
- Champions: (Mexico) Leonardo Lavalle (Mexico) Jorge Lozano
- Runners-up: (Italy) Diego Nargiso (Venezuela) Nicolas Pereira
- Score: 6–3, 7–6

Details
- Draw: 16
- Seeds: 4

Events
Singles	Doubles
- ABN World Tennis Tournament

Miloslav Mečíř and Milan Šrejber were the defending champions, but neither of them competed that year.
Leonardo Lavalle and Jorge Lozano won the title, defeating Diego Nargiso and Nicolas Pereira 6–3, 7–6 in the final.

== Seeds ==
1. (Australia) John Fitzgerald / (Sweden) Anders Järryd (quarterfinals)
2. (United States) Tim Pawsat / (Australia) Laurie Warder (first round)
3. (West Germany) Eric Jelen / (Czechoslovakia) Tomáš Šmíd (quarterfinals)
4. (United States) Patrick Galbraith / (Australia) David Macpherson (quarterfinals)

== Draw ==
Key

- Q = Qualifier
- WC = Wild card
- LL = Lucky loser
- Alt = Alternate
- ITF = ITF entry
- PR = Protected ranking
- SR = Special ranking
- SE = Special exempt
- JE = Junior exempt
- JR = Junior Accelerator Programme entrant
- CO = College Accelerator Programme entrant
- NG = Next Gen Accelerator Program entrant
- w/o = Walkover
- r = Retired
- d = Defaulted

=== Draw ===
First round
1	(Australia) J Fitzgerald (Sweden) A Järryd	6	6
(Iran) M Bahrami (France) Y Noah	2	4
(United Kingdom) J Bates (Australia) B Dyke	6	6^{2}	5
(Italy) D Nargiso (Venezuela) N Pereira	4	7^{7}	7
4	(United States) P Galbraith (Australia) D Machperson	6	6
(Netherlands) R Krajicek (Netherlands) M Schapers	4	3
(Denmark) M Mortensen (Netherlands) T Nijssen	6	6
Q	(Soviet Union) A Cherkasov (United States) R Phillips	4	1
(Mexico) L Lavalle (Mexico) J Lozano	6	4	6
(United States) T Nelson (Czechoslovakia) K Nováček	4	6	4
(Netherlands) P Haarhuis (Netherlands) M Koevermans	4	4
3	(West Germany) E Jelen (Czechoslovakia) T Šmíd	6	6
(Austria) A Antonitsch (United Kingdom) A Castle	6	7
(West Germany) P Baur (Socialist Federal Republic of Yugoslavia) S Živojinović	4	5
(United States) C Beckman (United States) L Jensen	7	5	7^{7}
2	(United States) T Pawsat (Australia) L Warder	5	7	6^{5}

Quarterfinals
1	(Australia) J Fitzgerald (Sweden) A Järryd	6^{1}	6^{10}
(Italy) D Nargiso (Venezuela) N Pereira	7^{7}	7^{12}
4	(United States) P Galbraith (Australia) D Machperson	3	4
(Denmark) M Mortensen (Netherlands) T Nijssen	6	6
(Mexico) L Lavalle (Mexico) J Lozano	6	6
3	(West Germany) E Jelen (Czechoslovakia) T Šmíd	4	1
(Austria) A Antonitsch (United Kingdom) A Castle	6	1	6^{5}
(United States) C Beckman (United States) L Jensen	4	6	7^{7}

Semifinals
(Italy) D Nargiso (Venezuela) N Pereira	7^{7}	6
(Denmark) M Mortensen (Netherlands) T Nijssen	6^{5}	4
(Mexico) L Lavalle (Mexico) J Lozano	6	6
(United States) C Beckman (United States) L Jensen	3	3

Final
(Italy) D Nargiso (Venezuela) N Pereira	3	6
(Mexico) L Lavalle (Mexico) J Lozano	6	7
