= 1994 America's Red Clay Tennis Championships =

- Date: May 9–16
- Edition: 2nd
- Category: ATP World Series
- Draw: 32S / 16D
- Prize money: $215,000
- Surface: Clay / outdoor
- Location: Coral Springs, FL, U.S.

Champions

Singles
- (Brazil) Luiz Mattar

Doubles
- (South Africa) Lan Bale / (New Zealand) Brett Steven
← 1993 ·	Delray Beach Open	· 1995 →

The 1994 America's Red Clay Tennis Championships was an ATP men's tennis tournament held in Coral Springs, Florida, United States that was part of the ATP World Series of the 1994 ATP Tour. It was the second edition of the tournament and was held from May 9 thorough May 16 and was played on outdoor clay courts. Sixth-seeded Luiz Mattar won the singles title.

== Finals ==
=== Singles ===
(Brazil) Luiz Mattar defeated (Australia) Jamie Morgan, 6–4, 3–6, 6–3

- It was Mattar's 1st singles title of the year and the 7th and last of his career.

=== Doubles ===
(South Africa) Lan Bale / (New Zealand) Brett Steven defeated (United States) Ken Flach / (France) Stephane Simian, 6–3, 7–5

- It was Bale's 2nd title of the year and the 3rd of his career. It was Steven's 1st title of the year and the 3rd of his career.
