= Oliver Fernández (tennis) =

Mexican tennis player

Oliver Fernandez
- Country (sports): Mexico
- Residence: Córdoba
- Born: 7 December 1972 (age 53) Orizaba, Mexico
- Height: 1.75 m (5 ft 9 in)
- Turned pro: 1991
- Plays: Right-handed
- Prize money: $148,944

Singles
- Career record: 9–15
- Career titles: 0
- Highest ranking: No. 141 (5 Jul 1993)

Doubles
- Career record: 2–5
- Career titles: 0
- Highest ranking: No. 178 (18 Apr 1994)

Oliver Fernandez (Orizaba, 7 December 1972) is a former professional tennis player from Mexico. He was captain of Mexico's Davis Cup side. Today he is a businessman.

== Career ==
Fernandez had a good year on the juniors circuit in 1990, finishing the season as the number three junior in the world. He was runner-up to Andrei Medvedev in the Orange Bowl and made the semi-finals of the boys' singles event at the 1990 Australian Open. The man who beat him in the semi-final, Dirk Dier, had been his doubles partner when he made the 1989 US Open boys' doubles quarter-finals.

Also in 1990, Fernandez represented the Mexico Davis Cup team for the first time. He managed to defeat Marcelo Filippini of Uruguay in Mexico's World Group player-off win and appeared in three further ties during his career, from which he had two wins, over Diego Pérez and then Jaime Yzaga.

The Orizaba born player was a semi-finalist at his home event, the Mexican Open, in 1993. Fernandez defeated Franco Davín, Agustín Moreno and Alberto Berasategui, before falling to Thomas Muster. He was also a doubles semi-finalist at the 1993 International Tennis Championships in Florida, with Juan Garat as his partner.

== Challenger titles ==
=== Singles: (1) ===
No.	Year	Tournament	Surface	Opponent	Score
1.	1991	Fortaleza, Brazil	Clay	(Germany) Christian Weis	6–3, 6–4

=== Doubles: (2) ===
No.	Year	Tournament	Surface	Partner	Opponents	Score
1.	1991	Puebla, Mexico	Hard	(Mexico) Luis Herrera	(United States) Doug Eisenman (United States) Dave Randall	6–4, 7–6
2.	1994	San Luis Potosí, Mexico	Clay	(Mexico) Leonardo Lavalle	(Mexico) Ismael Hernandez (Mexico) Luis Herrera	7–5, 7–5
