= 1997 Cerveza Club Colombia Open =

- Date: 27 October – 2 November
- Edition: 4th
- Category: World Series
- Draw: 32S / 16D
- Prize money: $303,000
- Surface: Clay / outdoor
- Location: Bogotá, Colombia

Champions

Singles
- (Spain) Francisco Clavet

Doubles
- (Argentina) Luis Lobo / (Brazil) Fernando Meligeni
- Cerveza Club Colombia Open

The 1997 Cerveza Club Colombia Open was a men's tennis tournament played on outdoor clay courts in Bogotá, Colombia that was part of the World Series category of the 1997 ATP Tour. It was the fourth edition of the tournament and was held from 27 October until 2 November. First-seeded Francisco Clavet won the singles title.

== Finals ==
=== Singles ===
(Spain) Francisco Clavet defeated (Ecuador) Nicolás Lapentti, 6–3, 6–3

- It was Clavet's 2nd and last singles title of the year and the 5th of his career.

=== Doubles ===
(Argentina) Luis Lobo / (Brazil) Fernando Meligeni defeated (Morocco) Karim Alami / (Venezuela) Maurice Ruah, 6–1, 6–3

- It was Lobo's 5th and last doubles title of the year and the 10th of his career. It was Meligeni's 4th and last doubles title of the year and the 5th of his career.
