= 1993 International Tennis Championships =

- Date: May 10–17
- Edition: 1st
- Category: World Series
- Draw: 32S / 16D
- Prize money: $200,000
- Surface: Clay / outdoor
- Location: Coral Springs, Florida, U.S.

Champions

Singles
- (United States) Todd Martin

Doubles
- (United States) Patrick McEnroe / (United States) Jonathan Stark
Delray Beach Open	· 1994 →

The 1993 International Tennis Championships was an ATP Tour men's tennis tournament held in Coral Springs, Florida in the United States and played on outdoor clay courts. It was the inaugural edition of the tournament and was held from May 10 until May 17, 1993. First-seeded Todd Martin won the singles title.

== Finals ==
(United States) Todd Martin defeated (United States) David Wheaton 6–3, 6–4

- It was Martin's first singles title of his career.

=== Doubles ===
(United States) Patrick McEnroe / (United States) Jonathan Stark defeated (United States) Paul Annacone / (United States) Doug Flach 6–4, 6–3
