= ATP Buzios =

Defunct tennis tournament
- Event name: Kolynos Cup (1991); ATP Buzios (1992)
- Tour: ATP Tour
- Founded: 1991
- Abolished: 1992
- Editions: 2
- Location: Armação dos Búzios, Brazil
- Venue: Marina Porto Búzios
- Surface: Hard / outdoor

The ATP Buzios, also known as the Kolynos Cup, was a men's tennis tournament played in Armação dos Búzios, Brazil. The event was played as part of the ATP Tour in 1991 and 1992.

== Finals ==
=== Singles ===
Year	Champions	Runners-up	Score
1991	(Spain) Jordi Arrese	(Brazil) Jaime Oncins	1–6, 6–4, 6–0
1992	(Brazil) Jaime Oncins	(Mexico) Luis Herrera	6–3, 6–2

=== Doubles ===
Year	Champions	Runners-up	Score
1991	(Spain) Sergio Casal (Spain) Emilio Sánchez	(Argentina) Javier Frana (Mexico) Leonardo Lavalle	4–6, 6–3, 6–4
1992	(Venezuela) Maurice Ruah (Cuba) Mario Tabares	(United States) Mark Keil (United States) Tom Mercer	7–6, 6–7, 6–4
