= Maurice Ruah =

Venezuelan tennis player

- Country (sports): Venezuela
- Born: February 19, 1971 (age 55) Caracas, Venezuela
- Height: 1.78 m (5 ft 10 in)
- Plays: Right-handed
- Prize money: $542,546

Singles
- Career record: 31–55 (at ATP Tour level, Grand Slam level, and in Davis Cup)
- Career titles: 0; 1 Challenger, 0 Futures
- Highest ranking: No. 90 (2 May 1994)

Grand Slam singles results
- Australian Open: 1R (1994)
- French Open: 1R (1994)
- Wimbledon: 1R (1991, 1994)
- US Open: 2R (1994)

Doubles
- Career record: 40–61 (at ATP Tour level, Grand Slam level, and in Davis Cup)
- Career titles: 1; 13 Challenger, 0 Futures
- Highest ranking: No. 82 (12 Sep 1994)

Grand Slam doubles results
- Australian Open: 1R (1994)
- French Open: 2R (1994)
- Wimbledon: 1R (1993, 1994, 1998)
- US Open: 2R (1996, 1998)
- Last updated on: 20 April 2026.

Maurice Ruah (born 19 February 1971) is a Venezuelan former professional tennis player. He achieved a career-high doubles ranking of world No. 82 in 1994.

His father Luis works in medical supplies and in the shoe industry, and his mother Claire assists her husband in medical supplies.

He and his doubles partner Yohny Romero won a bronze medal at the 1999 Pan American Games.

Ruah participated in 19 Davis Cup ties for Venezuela from 1989 to 2000, posting a 17–17 record in singles and an 8–5 record in doubles.

In July 2019, he becomes captain of the Davis Cup.

== ATP career finals ==
=== Doubles: 2 (1 win, 1 runner-up) ===
Legend Grand Slam Tournaments (0–0) ATP World Tour Finals (0–0) ATP World Tour Masters Series (0–0) ATP Championship Series (0–0) ATP World Series (1–1)	Finals by surface Hard (1–0) Clay (0–1) Grass (0–0) Carpet (0–0)	Finals by setting Outdoors (1–1) Indoors (0–0)

Result	W–L	Date	Tournament	Tier	Surface	Partner	Opponents	Score
Win	1–0	Nov 1992	Armação dos Búzios, Brazil	World Series	Hard	(Cuba) Mario Tabares	(United States) Mark Keil (United States) Tom Mercer	7–6, 6–7, 6–4
Loss	1–1	Nov 1997	Bogotá, Colombia	World Series	Clay	(Morocco) Karim Alami	(Argentina) Luis Lobo (Brazil) Fernando Meligeni	1–6, 3–6

== ATP Challenger and ITF Futures finals ==
=== Singles: 9 (1–8) ===
Legend ATP Challenger (1–8) ITF Futures (0–0)	Finals by surface Hard (0–8) Clay (1–0) Grass (0–0) Carpet (0–0)

Result	W–L	Date	Tournament	Tier	Surface	Opponent	Score
Win	1–0	Aug 1992	Fortaleza, Brazil	Challenger	Clay	(Portugal) Joao Cunha-Silva	6–4, 3–6, 6–4
Loss	1–1	Nov 1992	São Luiz do Paraitinga, Brazil	Challenger	Hard	(Brazil) Luiz Mattar	4–6, 4–6
Loss	1–2	May 1993	Jerusalem, Israel	Challenger	Hard	(Israel) Gilad Bloom	6–7, 4–6
Loss	1–3	Aug 1993	Winnetka, United States	Challenger	Hard	(Zimbabwe) Kevin Ullyett	3–6, 2–6
Loss	1–4	Oct 1993	Ponte Vedra, United States	Challenger	Hard	(France) Jean-Philippe Fleurian	6–7, 6–3, 2–6
Loss	1–5	Aug 1996	Belo Horizonte, Brazil	Challenger	Hard	(Brazil) Jaime Oncins	4–6, 3–6
Loss	1–6	May 1997	Jerusalem, Israel	Challenger	Hard	(Zimbabwe) Wayne Black	2–6, 1–6
Loss	1–7	Sep 1998	Urbana, United States	Challenger	Hard	(Canada) Daniel Nestor	6–3, 6–7, 3–6
Loss	1–8	Nov 1998	Las Vegas, United States	Challenger	Hard	(Philippines) Cecil Mamiit	5–7, 3–6

1989 - 1999 AO - Q2 (91), 1R (94) FO - Q1 (93, 97, 98). Q2 (99), 1R (94) WC - Q1 (92, 93), Q2 (99), 1R (91, 94) UO - Q1 (92, 96, 97, 99), Q2 (93, 98). 2R (94)

Indian Wells - Q2 (93), 1R (91) Miami - Q1 (96, 98), Q2 (99), Q3 (93), 1R (94, 95) Cincinnati - 1R (89) Paris - Q3 (95)

=== Doubles: 28 (13–15) ===
Legend ATP Challenger (13–15) ITF Futures (0–0)	Finals by surface Hard (9–7) Clay (4–6) Grass (0–0) Carpet (0–2)

Result	W–L	Date	Tournament	Tier	Surface	Partner	Opponents	Score
Win	1–0	Jun 1991	Fürth, Germany	Challenger	Clay	(Spain) Marcos Górriz	(Australia) Jamie Morgan (Australia) Sandon Stolle	6–2, 6–4
Win	2–0	Aug 1992	Ribeirão Preto, Brazil	Challenger	Clay	(Sweden) Christer Allgardh	(South Africa) Lan Bale (South Africa) Brendan Curry	2–6, 7–5, 6–4
Loss	2–1	Aug 1992	Fortaleza, Brazil	Challenger	Clay	(Sweden) Christer Allgardh	(Australia) Andrew Kratzmann (Australia) Roger Rasheed	6–7, 4–6
Loss	2–2	Sep 1992	Guaruja, Brazil	Challenger	Hard	(United States) Mario Tabares	(Brazil) Danilo Marcelino (Brazil) Fernando Meligeni	walkover
Loss	2–3	Nov 1992	São Luiz do Paraitinga, Brazil	Challenger	Hard	(United States) Mario Tabares	(Brazil) Luiz Mattar (Brazil) Jaime Oncins	3–6, 5–7
Loss	2–4	Apr 1993	Barcelona, Spain	Challenger	Clay	(United States) Mario Tabares	(Spain) Jordi Burillo (Spain) Sergio Casal	2–6, 6–4, 1–6
Win	3–4	Apr 1993	Riemerling, Germany	Challenger	Clay	(United States) Mario Tabares	(Netherlands) Sander Groen (Germany) Arne Thoms	6–3, 6–3
Loss	3–5	Jul 1993	Montebello, Canada	Challenger	Hard	(South Africa) Lan Bale	(United States) David Di Lucia (United States) Doug Flach	3–6, 2–6
Loss	3–6	Aug 1993	Segovia, Spain	Challenger	Hard	(The Bahamas) Roger Smith	(Spain) Juan-Ignacio Carrasco (United Kingdom) Mark Petchey	2–6, 5–7
Loss	3–7	Oct 1993	Cali, Colombia	Challenger	Clay	(Sweden) Christer Allgardh	(Netherlands) Tom Kempers (United States) Jack Waite	2–6, 4–6
Loss	3–8	Oct 1993	Ponte Vedra, United States	Challenger	Hard	(Italy) Laurence Tieleman	(Canada) Sebastien Lareau (Canada) Daniel Nestor	6–2, 1–6, 4–6
Win	4–8	Oct 1993	Caracas, Venezuela	Challenger	Hard	(Italy) Laurence Tieleman	(The Bahamas) Mark Knowles (United States) Alex O'Brien	5–7, 6–4, 7–6
Loss	4–9	Dec 1993	Paget, Bermuda	Challenger	Clay	(Venezuela) Nicolas Pereira	(The Bahamas) Mark Knowles (United States) Jared Palmer	1–6, 3–6
Win	5–9	May 1994	Taipei, Taiwan	Challenger	Hard	(Canada) Daniel Nestor	(Australia) Sandon Stolle (Australia) Michael Tebbutt	6–2, 6–0
Win	6–9	Nov 1994	Guadalajara, Mexico	Challenger	Clay	(Argentina) Juan-Ignacio Garat	(United States) Kelly Jones (United States) David Pate	6–2, 6–2
Loss	6–10	Jun 1995	Medellín, Colombia	Challenger	Clay	(India) Leander Paes	(Zimbabwe) Wayne Black (Hungary) Laszlo Markovits	5–7, 4–6
Loss	6–11	Apr 1996	Fergana, Uzbekistan	Challenger	Hard	(United States) Geoff Grant	(India) Leander Paes (India) Mahesh Bhupathi	3–6, 6–7
Win	7–11	May 1996	Andijan, Uzbekistan	Challenger	Hard	(United States) Geoff Grant	(India) Leander Paes (India) Mahesh Bhupathi	6–4, 6–3
Loss	7–12	Jun 1996	Medellín, Colombia	Challenger	Clay	(Israel) Eyal Ran	(Ecuador) Pablo Campana (Egypt) Tamer El Sawy	5–7, 1–6
Win	8–12	Aug 1996	Belo Horizonte, Brazil	Challenger	Hard	(Mexico) Leonardo Lavalle	(Mexico) Luis-Enrique Herrera (Romania) Gabriel Trifu	5–7, 6–4, 6–4
Loss	8–13	Sep 1996	Olbia, Italy	Challenger	Hard	(United States) Geoff Grant	(Italy) Nicola Bruno (France) Stephane Simian	5–7, 4–6
Win	9–13	Nov 1996	Puebla, Mexico	Challenger	Hard	(Mexico) Leonardo Lavalle	(United States) Bill Behrens (United States) Steve Campbell	7–5, 6–2
Win	10–13	Aug 1997	Olbia, Italy	Challenger	Hard	(United States) Geoff Grant	(Italy) Mose Navarra (Italy) Stefano Pescosolido	3–6, 6–2, 7–5
Win	11–13	Nov 1997	Puebla, Mexico	Challenger	Hard	(Egypt) Tamer El Sawy	(Italy) Massimo Ardinghi (Italy) Vincenzo Santopadre	7–6, 7–5
Win	12–13	Nov 1997	Ixtapa, Mexico	Challenger	Hard	(South Africa) Chris Haggard	(Mexico) Bernardo Martinez (Netherlands) Rogier Wassen	6–4, 7–6
Loss	12–14	Mar 1998	Kyoto, Japan	Challenger	Carpet	(Mexico) Oscar Ortiz	(Japan) Takao Suzuki (Zimbabwe) Kevin Ullyett	6–4, 1–6, 4–6
Win	13–14	Oct 1998	Caracas, Venezuela	Challenger	Hard	(United States) Geoff Grant	(Japan) Gouichi Motomura (Brazil) Andre Sa	4–6, 6–1, 6–2
Loss	13–15	Feb 1999	Wolfsburg, Germany	Challenger	Carpet	(Brazil) Adriano Ferreira	(Germany) Karsten Braasch (Germany) Dirk Dier	walkover

1989 - AO - 1R (94) FO - 1R (93), 2R (94) WC - Q1 (91, 92, 99), 1R (93, 94, 98) UO - Q1 (97), 1R (93, 94, 99), 2R (96, 98)

Indian Wells - Q1 (93) Miami - Q1 (97), Q2 (99), 1R (95), 2R (93, 94, 98) Cincinnati - 1R (89) Paris - 1R (95)
