= Mario Tabares =

Cuban tennis player

- Country (sports): Cuba
- Born: July 22, 1965 (age 61) Havana, Cuba
- Height: 5 ft 11 in (180 cm)
- Plays: Right-handed
- Prize money: $106,057

Singles
- Career record: 12–16 (at ATP Tour level, Grand Slam level, and in Davis Cup)
- Career titles: 0; 2 Challenger, 0 Futures
- Highest ranking: No. 131 (28 August 1989)

Grand Slam singles results
- French Open: 1R (1990)
- Wimbledon: Q3 (1992)

Doubles
- Career record: 9–16 (at ATP Tour level, Grand Slam level, and in Davis Cup)
- Career titles: 1; 4 Challenger, 0 Futures
- Highest ranking: No. 106 (26 April 1993)

Grand Slam doubles results
- Wimbledon: 1R (1993)
Medal record
Representing Cuba
Pan American Games
Bronze medal – third place	1991 Havana	Doubles
Bronze medal – third place	1991 Havana	Team
Central American and Caribbean Games
Gold medal – first place	1986 Santiago	Mixed doubles
Gold medal – first place	1990 Mexico City	Doubles
Silver medal – second place	1990 Mexico City	Team
Silver medal – second place	1993 Ponce	Doubes
Bronze medal – third place	1986 Santiago	Singles
Bronze medal – third place	1986 Santiago	Doubles
Bronze medal – third place	1990 Mexico City	Singles
Bronze medal – third place	1993 Ponce	Singles
Bronze medal – third place	1993 Ponce	Team
Summer Universiade
Bronze medal – third place	1987 Zagreb	Singles

Mario Iván Tabares (born July 22, 1965) is a Cuban former professional tennis player. He enjoyed most of his tennis success while playing doubles. During his career, he won one doubles title. He achieved a career-high doubles ranking of world No. 106 in 1993.

Tabares participated in 16 Davis Cup ties for Cuba from 1987 to 1994, posting a 15–17 record in singles and a 7–9 record in doubles.

He and his wife recently opened a tennis store in the heart of Miami named is MT Tennis Touch.

He competes competitively internationally. In April 2010, he became the ITF World Champion in Men's 40 Singles. He also became an ITF World Champion the same year with his brother Alexander Tabares in Men's 35 Doubles.

== ATP career finals ==
=== Doubles: 1 (1 win, 0 runners-up) ===
Legend Grand Slam Tournaments (0–0) ATP World Tour Finals (0–0) ATP World Tour Masters Series (0–0) ATP Championship Series (0–0) ATP World Series (1–0)	Finals by surface Hard (1–0) Clay (0–0) Grass (0–0) Carpet (0–0)	Finals by setting Outdoors (1–0) Indoors (0–0)

Result	W–L	Date	Tournament	Tier	Surface	Partner	Opponents	Score
Win	1–0	Nov 1992	Buzios, Brazil	World Series	Hard	(Venezuela) Maurice Ruah	(United States) Mark Keil (United States) Tom Mercer	7–6, 6–7, 6–4

== ATP Challenger and ITF Futures finals ==
=== Singles: 3 (2–1) ===
Legend ATP Challenger (2–1) ITF Futures (0–0)	Finals by surface Hard (1–0) Clay (0–1) Grass (0–0) Carpet (1–0)

Result	W–L	Date	Tournament	Tier	Surface	Opponent	Score
Win	1–0	Jul 1989	Campos do Jordão, Brazil	Challenger	Hard	(Brazil) Danilo Marcelino	7–6, 6–4
Win	2–0	Aug 1989	Brasília, Brazil	Challenger	Carpet	(Brazil) Luiz Mattar	6–3, 6–2
Loss	2–1	Aug 1992	Ribeirão Preto, Brazil	Challenger	Clay	(Chile) Gabriel Silberstein	6–7, 6–7

=== Doubles: 10 (4–6) ===
Legend ATP Challenger (4–6) ITF Futures (0–0)	Finals by surface Hard (1–2) Clay (3–4) Grass (0–0) Carpet (0–0)

Result	W–L	Date	Tournament	Tier	Surface	Partner	Opponents	Score
Loss	0–1	Aug 1989	São Paulo, Brazil	Challenger	Clay	(Brazil) Dacio Campos	(Brazil) Nelson Aerts (Brazil) Fernando Roese	6–2, 4–6, 4–6
Loss	0–2	Dec 1989	São Paulo, Brazil	Challenger	Clay	(Cuba) Juan Pino	(Brazil) Luiz Mattar (Brazil) Cassio Motta	5–7, 2–6
Win	1–2	Jan 1991	Vina del Mar, Chile	Challenger	Clay	(Cuba) Juan Pino	(Argentina) Gabriel Markus (Argentina) Francisco Yunis	6–3, 6–2
Win	2–2	Jul 1992	Campos do Jordao, Chile	Challenger	Hard	(Brazil) Jose Daher	(United States) Donald Johnson (United States) Tom Mercer	6–3, 6–7, 6–3
Loss	2–3	Sep 1992	Guaruja, Brazil	Challenger	Hard	(Venezuela) Maurice Ruah	(Brazil) Danilo Marcelino (Brazil) Fernando Meligeni	walkover
Win	3–3	Sep 1992	Bogotá, Colombia	Challenger	Clay	(Venezuela) Nicolas Pereira	(Brazil) William Kyriakos (Brazil) Fernando Meligeni	7–6, 7–5
Loss	3–4	Oct 1992	Cali, Colombia	Challenger	Clay	(Argentina) Daniel Orsanic	(Germany) Michael Geserer (Brazil) Fabio Silberberg	4–6, 4–6
Loss	3–5	Nov 1992	Sao Luis, Brazil	Challenger	Hard	(Venezuela) Maurice Ruah	(Brazil) Luiz Mattar (Brazil) Fabio Silberberg	3–6, 5–7
Loss	3–6	Apr 1993	Barcelona, Spain	Challenger	Clay	(Venezuela) Maurice Ruah	(Spain) Sergio Casal (Spain) Jordi Burillo	2–6, 6–4, 1–6
Win	4–6	Apr 1993	Riemerling, Germany	Challenger	Clay	(Venezuela) Maurice Ruah	(Netherlands) Sander Groen (Germany) Arne Thoms	6–3, 6–3
