= 1994 Abierto Mexicano =

- Date: 21–27 February
- Edition: 2nd
- Category: ATP World Series
- Draw: 32S / 16D
- Prize money: $300,000
- Surface: Clay / outdoor
- Location: Mexico City, Mexico

Champions

Singles
- (Austria) Thomas Muster

Doubles
- (United States) Francisco Montana / (United States) Bryan Shelton
- Mexican Open

The 1994 Abierto Mexicano, also known by its sponsored name Abierto Mexicano Telcel, was a men's tennis tournament held in Mexico City, Mexico that was part of the ATP World Series of the 1994 ATP Tour. It was the second edition of the tournament and was held from 21 February through 28 February 1994. First-seeded Thomas Muster won the singles title, his second win in a row at Mexico City.

== Finals ==
=== Singles ===
(Austria) Thomas Muster defeated (Brazil) Roberto Jabali, 6–3, 6–1

- It was Muster 1st singles title of the year and the 21st of his career.

=== Doubles ===
(United States) Francisco Montana / (United States) Bryan Shelton defeated (United States) Luke Jensen / (United States) Murphy Jensen, 6–3, 6–4
