= Tom Mercer =

American tennis player

- Country (sports): United States
- Born: November 10, 1964 (age 60); Pittsburgh, Pennsylvania
- Height: 6 ft 1 in (185 cm)
- Prize money: $93,715

Singles
- Career record: 0–6
- Highest ranking: No. 303 (August 28, 1989)

Grand Slam singles results
- Australian Open: 1R (1989)

Doubles
- Career record: 15–32
- Highest ranking: No. 112 (September 20, 1993)

Grand Slam doubles results
- Australian Open: 2R (1989)
- US Open: 2R (1993)

Tom Mercer (born November 10, 1964) is a former professional tennis player from the United States.

Mercer enjoyed most of his tennis success while playing doubles. During his career, he made the finals in two doubles events. He achieved a career-high doubles ranking of World No. 112 in 1993.

== Career finals ==
=== Doubles (2 runner-ups) ===
Result	W/L	Date	Tournament	Surface	Partner	Opponents	Score
Loss	0–1	1992	Buzios, Brazil	Hard	(United States) Mark Keil	(Venezuela) Maurice Ruah (Cuba) Mario Tabares	6–7, 7–6, 4–6
Loss	0–2	1993	Kitzbühel, Austria	Clay	(South Africa) Marius Barnard	(Argentina) Juan Garat (Argentina) Roberto Saad	4–6, 6–3, 3–6
