= Leonardo Lavalle =

Mexican tennis player and Broadcaster

- Country (sports): Mexico
- Residence: Mexico City, Mexico
- Born: 14 July 1967 (age 58) Mexico City, Mexico
- Height: 1.88 m (6 ft 2 in)
- Turned pro: 1985
- Retired: 1998
- Plays: Left-handed
- Prize money: $903,200

Singles
- Career record: 83–114
- Career titles: 1; 4 Challenger
- Highest ranking: No. 51 (17 March 1986)

Grand Slam singles results
- Australian Open: 4R (1989)
- French Open: 3R (1989)
- Wimbledon: 2R (1992)
- US Open: 2R (1986, 1992)

Other tournaments
- Olympic Games: QF (1992)

Doubles
- Career record: 134–137
- Career titles: 5; 9 Challenger
- Highest ranking: No. 23 (27 April 1992)

Grand Slam doubles results
- Australian Open: 3R (1985)
- French Open: SF (1988, 1991)
- Wimbledon: F (1991)
- US Open: 3R (1991)

Other doubles tournaments
- Olympic Games: 1R (1988, 1992)

Grand Slam mixed doubles results
- Australian Open: 1R (1987, 1992)
- French Open: 2R (1992)
- Wimbledon: 2R (1995)
- US Open: QF (1998)
- Last updated on: 13 January 2022.

Leonardo Lavalle Moreno (born 14 July 1967) is a former tennis player from Mexico. He reached his highest singles ATP-ranking of world No. 51 on 17 March 1986 and his highest doubles ranking of No. 23 in April 1992. Lavalle represented his native country at the 1992 Summer Olympics in Barcelona, where he was defeated in the quarterfinals by the eventual runner-up Jordi Arrese from Spain. The left-hander won one career title in singles in Tel Aviv in 1991.

Lavalle won the 1984 US Open – Boys' doubles title with Mihnea Năstase. He turned professional in 1985. He won the 1985 Wimbledon Junior singles title, and reached the men's doubles final in 1991. His singles win was notable for the fact that the men's singles winner that year Boris Becker was younger than Leonardo. He was also a Wimbledon doubles semifinalist in 1989 and in 1990 and at the French Open in 1988 and in 1991.

Lavalle won the Abierto Mexicano doubles titles in 1993 in Mexico City at the inaugural edition, and in 1995.

== Junior Grand Slam finals ==
=== Singles: 1 (1 title) ===
Result	Year	Tournament	Surface	Opponent	Score
Win	1985	Wimbledon	Grass	(Mexico) Eduardo Vélez	6–4, 6–4

=== Doubles: 1 (1 title) ===
Result	Year	Tournament	Surface	Partner	Opponents	Score
Win	1984	US Open	Hard	(Romania) Mihnea Năstase	(Peru) Jaime Yzaga (Mexico) Agustín Moreno	7–6, 1–6, 6–1

== ATP career finals ==
=== Singles: 2 (1 title, 1 runner-up) ===
Legend Grand Slam Tournaments (0–0) ATP World Tour Finals (0–0) ATP Masters Series (0–0) ATP Championship Series (0–0) ATP International Series (1–1)	Finals by surface Hard (1–0) Clay (0–0) Grass (0–0) Carpet (0–1)	Finals by setting Outdoors (1–0) Indoors (0–1)

Result	W–L	Date	Tournament	Tier	Surface	Opponent	Score
Loss	0–1	Oct 1988	Frankfurt, West Germany	Grand Prix	Carpet	(United States) Tim Mayotte	6–4, 4–6, 3–6
Win	1–1	Oct 1991	Tel Aviv, Israel	World Series	Hard	(South Africa) Christo van Rensburg	6–2, 3–6, 6–3

=== Doubles: 10 (5 titles, 5 runner-ups) ===
Legend Grand Slam Tournaments (0–1) ATP World Tour Finals (0–0) ATP Masters Series (0–0) ATP Championship Series (0–0) ATP International Series (5–4)	Finals by surface Hard (1–2) Clay (3–2) Grass (0–1) Carpet (1–0)	Finals by setting Outdoors (4–5) Indoors (1–0)

Result	W–L	Date	Tournament	Tier	Surface	Partner	Opponents	Score
Win	1–0	Oct 1986	Scottsdale, United States	Grand Prix	Hard	(United States) Mike Leach	(United States) Scott Davis (United States) David Pate	7–6, 6–4
Win	2–0	Oct 1987	Palermo, Italy	Grand Prix	Clay	(Italy) Claudio Panatta	(Czechoslovakia) Petr Korda (Czechoslovakia) Tomáš Šmíd	3–6, 6–4, 6–4
Win	3–0	Feb 1990	Rotterdam, Netherlands	World Series	Carpet	(Mexico) Jorge Lozano	(Italy) Diego Nargiso (Venezuela) Nicolás Pereira	6–3, 7–6
Loss	3–1	May 1990	Kiawah Island, United States	World Series	Clay	(United States) Jim Grabb	(United States) Scott Davis (United States) David Pate	2–6, 3–6
Loss	3–2	Jul 1991	Wimbledon, United Kingdom	Grand Slam	Grass	(Argentina) Javier Frana	(Australia) John Fitzgerald (Sweden) Anders Järryd	3–6, 4–6, 7–6, 1–6
Loss	3–3	Oct 1991	Tel Aviv, Israel	World Series	Hard	(Argentina) Javier Frana	(Czechoslovakia) David Rikl (Netherlands) Michiel Schapers	2–6, 7–6, 3–6
Loss	3–4	Nov 1991	Búzios, Brazil	World Series	Hard	(Argentina) Javier Frana	(Spain) Sergio Casal (Spain) Emilio Sánchez	6–4, 3–6, 4–6
Win	4–4	Feb 1993	Mexico City, Mexico	World Series	Clay	(Brazil) Jaime Oncins	(Argentina) Horacio de la Peña (Mexico) Jorge Lozano	7–6, 6–4
Loss	4–5	Apr 1993	Charlotte, United States	World Series	Clay	(Argentina) Javier Frana	(Sweden) Rikard Bergh (United States) Trevor Kronemann	1–6, 2–6
Win	5–5	Feb 1995	Mexico City (2)	World Series	Clay	(Argentina) Javier Frana	(Germany) Marc-Kevin Goellner (Italy) Diego Nargiso	7–5, 6–3

== ATP Challenger and ITF Futures finals ==
=== Singles: 5 (4–1) ===
Legend ATP Challenger (4–1) ITF Futures (0–0)	Finals by surface Hard (0–1) Clay (4–0) Grass (0–0) Carpet (0–0)

Result	W–L	Date	Tournament	Tier	Surface	Opponent	Score
Win	1–0	Aug 1991	Salou, Spain	Challenger	Clay	(Spain) Federico Sanchez	7–5, 6–4
Win	2–0	Apr 1992	San Luis Potosí, Mexico	Challenger	Clay	(United States) Francisco Montana	6–0, 6–7, 6–4
Win	3–0	May 1992	Acapulco, Mexico	Challenger	Clay	(Mexico) Luis Herrera	0–6, 6–3, 6–3
Win	4–0	Nov 1992	Pembroke Pines, United States	Challenger	Clay	(Argentina) Daniel Orsanic	6–4, 7–6
Loss	4–1	Apr 1994	Puerto Vallarta, Mexico	Challenger	Hard	(United States) Michael Joyce	1–6, 6–7

=== Doubles: 11 (9–2) ===
Legend ATP Challenger (9–2) ITF Futures (0–0)	Finals by surface Hard (2–1) Clay (6–1) Grass (0–0) Carpet (1–0)

Result	W–L	Date	Tournament	Tier	Surface	Partner	Opponents	Score
Win	1–0	Apr 1990	San Luis Potosí, Mexico	Challenger	Clay	(Mexico) Jorge Lozano	(Mexico) Luis Herrera (Argentina) Guillermo Pérez Roldán	5–7, 6–3, 6–2
Win	2–0	Feb 1991	Telford, United Kingdom	Challenger	Carpet	(Canada) Martin Laurendeau	(Sweden) Peter Nyborg (Netherlands) Jan Siemerink	7–6, 6–3
Win	3–0	Feb 1992	Jakarta, Indonesia	Challenger	Clay	(Netherlands) Mark Koevermans	(Netherlands) Jacco Eltingh (Netherlands) Tom Kempers	walkover
Win	4–0	Apr 1992	San Luis Potosí, Mexico	Challenger	Clay	(Mexico) Luis Herrera	(Mexico) Agustín Moreno (Mexico) Francisco Maciel	6–2, 6–2
Win	5–0	Apr 1993	San Luis Potosí, Mexico	Challenger	Clay	(Argentina) Javier Frana	(United States) Francisco Montana (United States) Bryan Shelton	6–3, 4–6, 6–4
Win	6–0	Apr 1994	San Luis Potosí, Mexico	Challenger	Clay	(Mexico) Oliver Fernández	(Mexico) Luis Herrera (Mexico) Ismael Hernandez	7–5, 7–5
Win	7–0	Jun 1994	Turin, Italy	Challenger	Clay	(Czech Republic) Libor Pimek	(United States) Richard Schmidt (United States) Greg Van Emburgh	6–2, 7–6
Loss	7–1	Sep 1994	Singapore, Singapore	Challenger	Hard	(Brazil) Danilo Marcelino	(United States) Brian Devening (Netherlands) Sander Groen	2–6, 6–7
Loss	7–2	Jun 1996	Bogotá, Colombia	Challenger	Clay	(Mexico) Óscar Ortiz	(United States) Brett Hansen-Dent (United States) T. J. Middleton	4–6, 3–6
Win	8–2	Aug 1996	Belo Horizonte, Brazil	Challenger	Hard	(Venezuela) Maurice Ruah	(Mexico) Luis Herrera (Romania) Gabriel Trifu	5–7, 6–4, 6–4
Win	9–2	Nov 1996	Puebla, Mexico	Challenger	Hard	(Venezuela) Maurice Ruah	(United States) Bill Behrens (United States) Steve Campbell	7–5, 6–2

== Performance timelines ==
Key
W	F	SF	QF	#R	RR	Q#	DNQ	A	NH

(W) winner; (F) finalist; (SF) semifinalist; (QF) quarterfinalist; (#R) rounds 4, 3, 2, 1; (RR) round-robin stage; (Q#) qualification round; (DNQ) did not qualify; (A) absent; (NH) not held; (SR) strike rate (events won / competed); (W–L) win–loss record.

=== Singles ===
Tournament	1985	1986	1987	1988	1989	1990	1991	1992	1993	1994	1995	1996	SR	W–L	Win %
Grand Slam tournaments
Australian Open	2R	A	1R	A	4R	2R	1R	1R	1R	A	A	Q1	0 / 7	4–7	36%
French Open	A	1R	A	1R	3R	A	1R	A	A	A	A	A	0 / 4	2–4	33%
Wimbledon	Q1	1R	Q3	A	1R	Q2	A	2R	A	A	A	A	0 / 3	1–3	25%
US Open	1R	2R	A	1R	1R	A	A	2R	A	Q2	1R	Q2	0 / 6	2–6	25%
Win–loss	0–2	1–3	0–1	0–2	5–4	1–1	0–2	2–3	0–1	0–0	0–1	0–0	0 / 20	9–20	31%
Olympic Games
Summer Olympics	Not Held			2R	Not Held			QF	Not Held			A	0 / 2	4–2	67%
ATP Masters Series
Indian Wells	A	A	A	A	1R	A	A	A	A	A	A	A	0 / 1	0–1	0%
Miami	A	1R	A	1R	3R	A	A	1R	2R	A	A	Q1	0 / 5	3–5	38%
Monte Carlo	A	A	A	A	1R	A	A	A	A	A	A	A	0 / 1	0–1	0%
Hamburg	A	A	A	A	1R	A	A	A	A	A	A	A	0 / 1	0–1	0%
Rome	A	3R	A	A	3R	A	A	A	A	A	A	A	0 / 2	4–2	67%
Canada	A	1R	A	A	A	A	A	2R	A	A	A	Q2	0 / 2	1–2	33%
Cincinnati	A	2R	1R	A	A	A	A	1R	A	A	A	A	0 / 3	1–3	25%
Win–loss	0–0	3–4	0–1	0–1	4–5	0–0	0–0	1–3	1–1	0–0	0–0	0–0	0 / 15	9–15	38%

=== Doubles ===
Tournament	1985	1986	1987	1988	1989	1990	1991	1992	1993	1994	1995	1996	1997	SR	W–L	Win %
Grand Slam tournaments
Australian Open	3R	A	2R	A	1R	2R	1R	1R	1R	1R	A	2R	A	0 / 9	4–9	31%
French Open	A	2R	A	SF	1R	A	SF	3R	A	1R	A	A	A	0 / 6	11–6	65%
Wimbledon	A	A	1R	1R	SF	SF	F	3R	A	A	1R	A	A	0 / 7	15–7	68%
US Open	A	1R	1R	2R	2R	1R	3R	2R	A	Q2	1R	2R	A	0 / 9	6–9	40%
Win–loss	2–1	1–2	0–3	5–3	5–4	5–3	11–4	5–4	0–1	0–2	0–2	2–2	0–0	0 / 31	36–31	54%
Olympic Games
Summer Olympics	Not Held			1R	Not Held			1R	Not Held			A	NH	0 / 2	0–2	0%
ATP Masters Series
Indian Wells	A	A	A	A	1R	A	A	1R	A	A	A	A	A	0 / 2	0–2	0%
Miami	A	A	A	1R	2R	2R	3R	3R	1R	A	A	A	Q1	0 / 6	4–6	40%
Monte Carlo	A	A	A	A	SF	A	2R	A	A	A	A	A	A	0 / 2	4–2	67%
Hamburg	A	A	A	A	1R	A	1R	A	A	A	A	A	A	0 / 2	0–2	0%
Rome	A	2R	A	A	1R	A	2R	A	A	A	A	A	A	0 / 3	2–3	40%
Canada	A	2R	A	A	A	1R	A	2R	A	A	A	A	A	0 / 3	2–3	40%
Cincinnati	A	1R	1R	A	A	A	A	A	A	A	A	A	A	0 / 2	0–2	0%
Win–loss	0–0	2–3	0–1	0–1	4–5	0–2	3–4	3–3	0–1	0–0	0–0	0–0	0–0	0 / 20	12–20	38%

=== Mixed doubles ===
Tournament	1986	1987	1988	1989	1990	1991	1992	1993	1994	1995	SR	W–L	Win %
Grand Slam tournaments
Australian Open	A	1R	A	A	A	A	1R	A	A	A	0 / 2	0–2	0%
French Open	1R	A	A	1R	A	A	2R	A	A	A	0 / 3	1–3	25%
Wimbledon	A	A	A	A	A	A	1R	A	A	2R	0 / 2	1–2	33%
US Open	A	A	QF	A	A	2R	1R	A	A	A	0 / 3	3–3	50%
Win–loss	0–1	0–1	2–1	0–1	0–0	1–1	1–4	0–0	0–0	1–1	0 / 10	5–10	33%
