= Johan Donar =

Swedish tennis player

- Country (sports): Sweden
- Born: 24 March 1966 (age 58); Stockholm, Sweden
- Height: 1.80 m (5 ft 11 in)
- Turned pro: 1990
- Plays: Right-handed
- Prize money: $95,363

Doubles
- Career record: 22–37
- Career titles: 1
- Highest ranking: No. 72 (22 Mar 1993)

Grand Slam doubles results
- Australian Open: 1R (1993)
- French Open: 1R (1993)
- Wimbledon: 1R (1993)
- US Open: 1R (1993)

Mixed doubles

Grand Slam mixed doubles results
- Wimbledon: 1R (1993)

Johan Donar (born 24 March 1966) is a former professional tennis player from Sweden.

== Career ==
Donar was a doubles specialist and appeared in only one singles event during his career on the ATP Tour, at Mexico City in 1993, where he was defeated in the opening round by Thomas Muster. His best ever singles ranking was 371 in the world.

He broke into the top 100 of the doubles rankings in 1992, after winning the tournament in Palermo, with countryman Ola Jonsson. Earlier that year he was a semi-finalist twice, both times with Jan Apell, at Kitzbuhel and then Prague.

In 1993 he took part in all four Grand Slam events, but wasn't able to register a win in any of his matches. He partnered Peter Nyborg at Wimbledon, but played beside Jonsson in the other three tournaments.

== ATP career finals ==
=== Doubles: 1 (1–0) ===
Result	W-L	Date	Tournament	Surface	Partner	Opponents	Score
Win	1–0	Oct 1992	Palermo, Italy	Clay	(Sweden) Ola Jonsson	(Argentina) Horacio de la Peña (Czechoslovakia) Vojtěch Flégl	5–7, 6–3, 6–4

== Challenger titles ==
=== Doubles: (2) ===
No.	Year	Tournament	Surface	Partner	Opponents	Score
1.	1992	Tampere, Finland	Clay	(Sweden) Jonas Björkman	(Sweden) Jan Gunnarsson (Denmark) Michael Mortensen	6–4, 6–4
2.	1992	Venice, Italy	Clay	(Sweden) Ola Jonsson	(Italy) Cristian Brandi (Italy) Federico Mordegan	6–3, 6–2
