= Juan Garat (tennis) =

Argentine tennis player (born 1973)

Juan Ignacio Garat
- Country (sports): Argentina
- Born: May 16, 1973 (age 53) Corrientes, Argentina
- Height: 1.80 m (5 ft 11 in)
- Turned pro: 1991
- Retired: 1999
- Plays: Right-handed (one-handed backhand)
- Prize money: $122,941

Singles
- Career record: 11–24
- Career titles: 0
- Highest ranking: No. 249 (May 3, 1993)

Doubles
- Career record: 59–63
- Career titles: 1 (ATP)
- Highest ranking: No. 85 (March 28, 1994)

Grand Slam doubles results
- French Open: 2R (1994)
- Wimbledon: 1R (1993, 1994)
- US Open: 1R (1994)

Juan Garat (born 16 May 1973) is a former professional tennis player from Argentina. He achieved a career-high singles ranking of World No. 249, attained on 3 May 1993, and a career-high doubles ranking of World No. 85 in 1994.

== Career ==
He played collegiate tennis for Troy University in Troy, Alabama from 1989 to 1993. In December 1989, Garat participated in the Orange Bowl for players Under 16 after entering as a qualifier, and won the tournament after upseting the 11th-seeded Reinhard Wawra in the final, 6–2, 4–6, 7-6^{(8–6)}. While a member of the Trojans tennis team, he helped lead them to the NCAA Championships during the 1993 season. The Trojans finished the season ranked No. 8 in the Rolex National Rankings. For Garat's successes during his senior season, he was named an ITA All-American.

Upon graduating from Troy in 1993, Garat became a full-time professional tennis player, enjoying most of his tennis success while playing doubles. During his career, he won one doubles title, the 1993 Philips Head Cup at Kitzbühel, in which he and his partner Roberto Saad beat the duo of Marius Barnard and Tom Mercer in the final, 6–4, 3–6, 6–3. He achieved a career-high doubles ranking of World No. 85 in 1994. His best performance in a grand slam was reaching the second round in the 1994 French Open – Men's doubles.

== Career finals ==
=== Doubles (1 titles, 2 runner-ups) ===
Result	W/L	Date	Tournament	Surface	Partner	Opponents	Score
Win	1–0	Aug 1993	Kitzbühel, Austria	Clay	(Argentina) Roberto Saad	(South Africa) Marius Barnard (United States) Tom Mercer	6–4, 3–6, 6–3
Loss	1–1	Aug 1993	San Marino	Clay	(Argentina) Roberto Saad	(Argentina) Daniel Orsanic (Finland) Olli Rahnasto	4–6, 6–1, 3–6
Loss	1–2	Sep 1993	Palermo, Italy	Clay	(Mexico) Jorge Lozano	(Spain) Sergio Casal (Spain) Emilio Sánchez	3–6, 3–6
