= Jaime Oncins =

Brazilian tennis player

- Country (sports): Brazil
- Residence: São Paulo, Brazil
- Born: 16 June 1970 (age 56) São Paulo, Brazil
- Height: 1.95 m (6 ft 5 in)
- Turned pro: 1988
- Retired: 2001
- Plays: Right-handed (one-handed backhand)
- Prize money: $1,211,476

Singles
- Career record: 76–95
- Career titles: 2; 8 Challenger, 0 Futures
- Highest ranking: No. 34 (3 May 1993)

Grand Slam singles results
- Australian Open: 3R (1991)
- French Open: 4R (1992)
- Wimbledon: 1R (1991)
- US Open: 1R (1991, 1992, 1993, 1996, 1997)

Other tournaments
- Olympic Games: QF (1992)

Doubles
- Career record: 126–125
- Career titles: 5; 11 Challenger, 0 Futures
- Highest ranking: No. 22 (10 July 2000)

Grand Slam doubles results
- Australian Open: 1R (1992, 2000)
- French Open: SF (2000)
- Wimbledon: 3R (2000)
- US Open: 3R (2000)

Other doubles tournaments
- Olympic Games: 1R (1992, 2000)

Grand Slam mixed doubles results
- French Open: F (2001)
- US Open: 2R (2000)

Team competitions
- Davis Cup: SF (1992, 2000)
- Last updated on: 11 July 2022.

Jaime Oncins (born 16 June 1970) is a former professional tennis player from Brazil.

Oncins represented his native country at the 1992 Summer Olympics in Barcelona, where he reached the quarterfinals before falling to Russia's Andrei Cherkasov. The right-hander won two individual career titles (Bologna and Búzios, both in 1992). He reached his highest singles ATP-ranking on May 3, 1993, when he became world No. 34.

Oncins' best performance at a major was at the 1992 French Open, where he reached the Round of 16, losing to eventual finalist, Petr Korda. In the second round of the tournament, Oncins had a famous victory from two sets down against former world No. 1 and three-time French Open champion, Ivan Lendl. Oncins was also the last player that Jimmy Connors beat at the US Open. Connors beat Oncins in straight sets in the first round of the 1992 US Open.

Oncins was a runner-up in the Roland Garros mixed doubles in 2001, with Paola Suárez from Argentina.

== Grand Slam finals ==
=== Mixed doubles (1 runner-up) ===
Result	Year	Championship	Surface	Partner	Opponents	Score
Loss	2001	French Open	Clay	(Argentina) Paola Suárez	(Spain) Tomás Carbonell (Spain) Virginia Ruano Pascual	5–7, 3–6

== ATP career finals ==
=== Singles: 5 (2 titles, 3 runner-ups) ===
Legend Grand Slam Tournaments (0–0) ATP World Tour Finals (0–0) ATP Masters 1000 Series (0–0) ATP 500 Series (0–0) ATP 250 Series (2–3)	Finals by surface Hard (1–3) Clay (1–0) Grass (0–0) Carpet (0–0)	Finals by setting Outdoors (2–3) Indoors (0–0)

Result	W–L	Date	Tournament	Tier	Surface	Opponent	Score
Loss	0–1	Oct 1991	Búzios, Brazil	World Series	Hard	(Spain) Jordi Arrese	6–1, 4–6, 0–6
Loss	0–2	Nov 1991	São Paulo, Brazil	World Series	Hard	(Argentina) Christian Miniussi	6–2, 3–6, 4–6
Win	1–2	May 1992	Bologna, Italy	World Series	Clay	(Italy) Renzo Furlan	6–2, 6–4
Win	2–2	Nov 1992	Búzios, Brazil	World Series	Hard	(Mexico) Luis Herrera	6–3, 6–2
Loss	2–3	Nov 1992	São Paulo, Brazil	World Series	Hard	(Brazil) Luiz Mattar	1–6, 4–6

=== Doubles: 11 (5 titles, 6 runner-ups) ===
Legend Grand Slam Tournaments (0–0) ATP World Tour Finals (0–0) ATP Masters 1000 Series (0–0) ATP 500 Series (1–0) ATP 250 Series (4–6)	Finals by surface Hard (1–1) Clay (4–5) Grass (0–0) Carpet (0–0)	Finals by setting Outdoors (5–6) Indoors (0–0)

Result	W–L	Date	Tournament	Tier	Surface	Partner	Opponents	Score
Loss	0–1	Jan 1991	Wellington, New Zealand	World Series	Hard	(United States) John Letts	(Brazil) Luiz Mattar (Venezuela) Nicolás Pereira	6–4, 6–7, 2–6
Loss	0–2	Apr 1991	Madrid, Spain	World Series	Clay	(Brazil) Luiz Mattar	(Argentina) Gustavo Luza (Brazil) Cássio Motta	0–6, 5–7
Loss	0–3	May 1991	Bologna, Italy	World Series	Clay	(Brazil) Luiz Mattar	(United States) Luke Jensen (United States) Laurie Warder	4–6, 6–7
Win	1–3	Nov 1991	São Paulo, Brazil	World Series	Hard	(Ecuador) Andrés Gómez	(Mexico) Jorge Lozano (Brazil) Cássio Motta	7–5, 6–4
Win	2–3	Feb 1993	Mexico City, Mexico	World Series	Clay	(Mexico) Leonardo Lavalle	(Argentina) Horacio de la Peña (Mexico) Jorge Lozano	7–6, 6–4
Loss	2–4	Aug 1993	Prague, Czech Republic	World Series	Clay	(Mexico) Jorge Lozano	(Netherlands) Hendrik Jan Davids (Czech Republic) Libor Pimek	3–6, 6–7
Win	3–4	Mar 1999	Casablanca, Morocco	World Series	Clay	(Brazil) Fernando Meligeni	(Italy) Massimo Ardinghi (Italy) Vincenzo Santopadre	6–2, 6–3
Win	4–4	Jun 1999	Merano, Italy	World Series	Clay	(Argentina) Lucas Arnold Ker	(Germany) Marc-Kevin Goellner (United States) Eric Taino	6–4, 7–6
Win	5–4	Jul 1999	Stuttgart, Germany	Championship Series	Clay	(Argentina) Daniel Orsanic	(North Macedonia) Aleksandar Kitinov (United States) Jack Waite	6–2, 6–1
Loss	5–5	Apr 2001	Munich, Germany	International Series	Clay	(Argentina) Daniel Orsanic	(Czech Republic) Petr Luxa (Czech Republic) Radek Štěpánek	7–5, 2–6, 6–7^{(5–7)}
Loss	5–6	May 2001	Sankt Pölten, Austria	International Series	Clay	(Argentina) Daniel Orsanic	(Czech Republic) Petr Pála (Czech Republic) David Rikl	3–6, 7–5, 5–7

== ATP Challenger and ITF Futures finals ==
=== Singles: 13 (8–5) ===
Legend ATP Challenger (8–5) ITF Futures (0–0)	Finals by surface Hard (2–3) Clay (6–1) Grass (0–0) Carpet (0–1)

Result	W–L	Date	Tournament	Tier	Surface	Opponent	Score
Win	1–0	Aug 1989	Lins, Brazil	Challenger	Clay	(Brazil) Fernando Roese	1–6, 6–0, 6–3
Win	2–0	Jul 1990	Campos do Jordão, Brazil	Challenger	Hard	(Brazil) Jose Daher	6–2, 6–2
Loss	2–1	Aug 1990	Brasília, Brazil	Challenger	Carpet	(Brazil) Cássio Motta	6–7, 4–6
Loss	2–2	Oct 1990	Manaus, Brazil	Challenger	Hard	(Mexico) Luis-Enrique Herrera	2–6, 5–7
Win	3–2	Nov 1990	São Paulo, Brazil	Challenger	Clay	(Argentina) Francisco Yunis	6–3, 6–3
Win	4–2	Oct 1991	São Paulo, Brazil	Challenger	Clay	(Brazil) Fernando Roese	6–4, 6–4
Loss	4–3	May 1992	São Paulo, Brazil	Challenger	Hard	(Mexico) Luis-Enrique Herrera	2–6, 6–3, 4–6
Loss	4–4	Oct 1992	Recife, Brazil	Challenger	Hard	(Brazil) Luiz Mattar	6–7, 7–5, 5–7
Win	5–4	Sep 1993	Natal, Brazil	Challenger	Clay	(Argentina) Marcelo Ingaramo	3–6, 6–2, 6–3
Win	6–4	Jun 1995	Asunción, Paraguay	Challenger	Clay	(Argentina) Gastón Etlis	6–3, 6–4
Loss	6–5	Jun 1996	Medellín, Colombia	Challenger	Clay	(Colombia) Mauricio Hadad	6–2, 3–6, 1–6
Win	7–5	Aug 1996	Belo Horizonto, Brazil	Challenger	Hard	(Venezuela) Maurice Ruah	6–4, 6–3
Win	8–5	Oct 1996	Seoul, South Korea	Challenger	Clay	(Sweden) Patrik Fredriksson	1–6, 6–1, 6–2

=== Doubles: 17 (11–6) ===
Legend ATP Challenger (11–6) ITF Futures (0–0)	Finals by surface Hard (2–3) Clay (8–3) Grass (0–0) Carpet (1–0)

Result	W–L	Date	Tournament	Tier	Surface	Partner	Opponents	Score
Loss	0–1	Jul 1989	São Paulo, Brazil	Challenger	Clay	(Brazil) Otavio Della	(Australia) David Macpherson (Argentina) Gerardo Mirad	6–2, 6–7, 2–6
Win	1–1	Jul 1990	Campos do Jordão, Brazil	Challenger	Hard	(Brazil) Jose Daher	(Brazil) Nelson Aerts (Brazil) Fernando Roese	7–6, 6–4
Win	2–1	Aug 1990	Brasília, Brazil	Challenger	Carpet	(Canada) Andrew Sznajder	(Brazil) Luiz Mattar (Brazil) Fernando Roese	7–5, 3–6, 7–6
Win	3–1	Apr 1991	Lisbon, Portugal	Challenger	Clay	(South Africa) David Adams	(France) Tarik Benhabiles (France) Olivier Delaître	5–7, 6–2, 6–3
Win	4–1	Oct 1991	São Paulo, Brazil	Challenger	Clay	(Brazil) Luiz Mattar	(Argentina) Juan-Ignacio Garat (Brazil) Marcelo Saliola	6–4, 6–4
Loss	4–2	Jun 1992	Yvetot, France	Challenger	Clay	(Czech Republic) Tomas Anzari	(Sweden) Mårten Renström (Sweden) Mikael Tillström	6–7, 7–5, 2–6
Loss	4–3	Oct 1992	Recife, Brazil	Challenger	Hard	(Brazil) Luiz Mattar	(Canada) Sébastien Lareau (Canada) Daniel Nestor	7–5, 4–6, 6–7
Win	5–3	Nov 1992	São Luis, Brazil	Challenger	Hard	(Brazil) Luiz Mattar	(Venezuela) Maurice Ruah (Cuba) Mario Tabares	6–3, 7–5
Loss	5–4	Sep 1993	Natal, Brazil	Challenger	Clay	(Brazil) Luiz Mattar	(Netherlands) Stephen Noteboom (United States) Jack Waite	6–4, 0–6, 3–6
Loss	5–5	Nov 1993	São Luis, Brazil	Challenger	Hard	(Brazil) Luiz Mattar	(Brazil) Otavio Della (Brazil) Marcelo Saliola	7–6, 3–6, 6–7
Win	6–5	Feb 1996	Punta del Este, Uruguay	Challenger	Clay	(Brazil) Gustavo Kuerten	(Mexico) Alejandro Hernández (Germany) Simon Touzil	5–7, 6–4, 7–6
Loss	6–6	Oct 1996	Tanagura, Japan	Challenger	Hard	(Belarus) Max Mirnyi	(United States) Brian Macphie (The Bahamas) Roger Smith	4–6, 4–6
Win	7–6	Oct 1997	Santiago, Chile	Challenger	Clay	(Argentina) Lucas Arnold Ker	(Argentina) Diego del Río (Argentina) Mariano Puerta	6–2, 6–2
Win	8–6	Jun 1998	Eisenach, Germany	Challenger	Clay	(Brazil) Cristiano Testa	(Germany) Rene Nicklisch (Germany) Patrick Sommer	6–1, 6–3
Win	9–6	Jul 1998	Ulm, Germany	Challenger	Clay	(Brazil) Márcio Carlsson	(Germany) Dirk Dier (Germany) Michael Kohlmann	6–4, 6–7, 6–3
Win	10–6	Sep 1998	Florianópolis, Brazil	Challenger	Clay	(Brazil) André Sá	(Uruguay) Marcelo Filippini (Uruguay) Gonzalo Rodriguez	6–0, 6–1
Win	11–6	Oct 1999	São Paulo, Brazil	Challenger	Clay	(Argentina) Daniel Orsanic	(Argentina) Mariano Hood (Argentina) Sebastián Prieto	6–2, 6–2

== Performance timelines ==
Key
W	F	SF	QF	#R	RR	Q#	DNQ	A	NH

(W) winner; (F) finalist; (SF) semifinalist; (QF) quarterfinalist; (#R) rounds 4, 3, 2, 1; (RR) round-robin stage; (Q#) qualification round; (DNQ) did not qualify; (A) absent; (NH) not held; (SR) strike rate (events won / competed); (W–L) win–loss record.

=== Singles ===
Tournament	1990	1991	1992	1993	1994	1995	1996	1997	1998	1999	SR	W–L	Win %
Grand Slam tournaments
Australian Open	A	3R	1R	A	A	A	A	A	A	A	0 / 2	2–2	50%
French Open	A	2R	4R	2R	Q3	A	Q2	Q1	Q2	Q1	0 / 3	5–3	63%
Wimbledon	Q1	1R	A	A	A	A	A	A	A	A	0 / 1	0–1	0%
US Open	A	1R	1R	1R	A	A	1R	1R	A	A	0 / 5	0–5	0%
Win–loss	0–0	3–4	3–3	1–2	0–0	0–0	0–1	0–1	0–0	0–0	0 / 11	7–11	39%
Olympic Games
Summer Olympics	NH		QF	Not Held			A	Not Held			0 / 1	3–1	75%
ATP Masters Series
Indian Wells	A	A	A	1R	A	A	Q2	A	A	A	0 / 1	0–1	0%
Miami	A	2R	1R	2R	1R	Q2	Q1	Q2	A	A	0 / 4	1–4	20%
Monte Carlo	A	A	A	1R	A	A	A	A	A	A	0 / 1	0–1	0%
Hamburg	A	A	A	3R	A	A	A	A	A	A	0 / 1	2–1	67%
Rome	A	A	A	1R	A	A	A	A	A	A	0 / 1	0–1	0%
Win–loss	0–0	1–1	0–1	2–5	0–1	0–0	0–0	0–0	0–0	0–0	0 / 8	3–8	27%

=== Doubles ===
Tournament	1991	1992	1993	1994	1995	1996	1997	1998	1999	2000	2001	SR	W–L	Win %
Grand Slam tournaments
Australian Open	A	1R	A	A	A	A	A	A	A	1R	A	0 / 2	0–2	0%
French Open	1R	1R	3R	1R	A	A	A	A	2R	SF	1R	0 / 7	7–7	50%
Wimbledon	1R	A	A	A	A	A	A	A	1R	3R	A	0 / 3	2–3	40%
US Open	2R	1R	1R	A	A	A	A	A	1R	3R	2R	0 / 6	4–6	40%
Win–loss	1–3	0–3	2–2	0–1	0–0	0–0	0–0	0–0	1–3	8–4	1–2	0 / 18	13–18	42%
National Representation
Olympic Games
Summer Olympics	NH	1R	Not Held			A	Not Held			1R	NH	0 / 2	0–2	0%
Year-End Championships
ATP Finals	Did not qualify									RR	DNQ	0 / 1	1–2	33%
ATP Masters Series
Indian Wells	A	A	A	A	A	A	A	A	A	1R	A	0 / 1	0–1	0%
Miami	A	A	1R	1R	A	A	A	A	A	2R	2R	0 / 4	2–4	33%
Monte Carlo	A	A	A	A	A	A	A	A	A	A	SF	0 / 1	3–1	75%
Hamburg	A	A	QF	A	A	A	A	A	A	QF	QF	0 / 3	6–3	67%
Rome	A	A	2R	A	A	A	A	A	A	QF	2R	0 / 3	4–3	57%
Canada	A	A	A	A	A	A	A	A	A	A	1R	0 / 1	0–1	0%
Stuttgart	A	A	A	A	A	A	A	A	A	QF	A	0 / 1	2–1	67%
Paris	A	A	A	A	A	A	A	A	A	1R	A	0 / 1	0–1	0%
Win–loss	0–0	0–0	3–3	0–1	0–0	0–0	0–0	0–0	0–0	7–6	7–5	0 / 15	17–15	53%
