= 1990 Wimbledon Championships – Girls' singles =

Girls' singles
- 1990 Wimbledon Championships

Final
- Champion: (Czechoslovakia) Andrea Strnadová
- Runner-up: (Australia) Kirrily Sharpe
- Score: 6–2, 6–4

Events
Singles	men	women		boys	girls
Doubles	men	women	mixed	boys	girls
WC Singles	men	women	quad
WC Doubles	men	women	quad
Legends	men	women	seniors
← 1989 ·	Wimbledon Championships	· 1991 →

Andrea Strnadová successfully defended her title, defeating Kirrily Sharpe in the final, 6–2, 6–4 to win the girls' singles tennis title at the 1990 Wimbledon Championships.

== Seeds ==
1. (Japan) Naoko Sawamatsu (quarterfinals)
2. (United States) Carrie Cunningham (second round, withdrew)
3. (Bulgaria) Magdalena Maleeva (quarterfinals)
4. (West Germany) Anke Huber (semifinals)
5. (Australia) Kristin Godridge (quarterfinals)
6. (Australia) Kirrily Sharpe (final)
7. (Czechoslovakia) Andrea Strnadová (champion)
8. (France) Noëlle van Lottum (semifinals)
9. (West Germany) Barbara Rittner (third round)
10. (United States) Erika deLone (third round)
11. (Israel) Yael Segal (third round)
12. (Australia) Nicole Pratt (third round)
13. (Czechoslovakia) Karina Habšudová (second round)
14. (Chinese Taipei) Wang Shi-ting (second round)
15. (Italy) Silvia Farina (quarterfinals)
16. (Argentina) María José Gaidano (second round)

Click on the seed number of a player to go to their draw section.

== Draw ==
=== Key ===
- Q = Qualifier
- WC = Wild card
- LL = Lucky loser
- Alt = Alternate
- SE = Special exempt
- PR = Protected ranking
- ITF = ITF entry
- JE = Junior exempt
- w/o = Walkover
- r = Retired
- d = Defaulted
- SR = Special ranking

=== Finals ===
Quarterfinals
1	(Japan) Naoko Sawamatsu	6	0	3
7	(Czechoslovakia) Andrea Strnadová	0	6	6
4	(West Germany) Anke Huber	6	6
5	(Australia) Kristin Godridge	2	3
6	(Australia) Kirrily Sharpe	6	4	7
3	(Bulgaria) Magdalena Maleeva	4	6	5
8	(France) Noëlle van Lottum	5	6	6
15	(Italy) Silvia Farina	7	3	0

Semifinals
7	(Czechoslovakia) Andrea Strnadová	6	6
4	(West Germany) Anke Huber	2	4
6	(Australia) Kirrily Sharpe	7^{7}	6
8	(France) Noëlle van Lottum	6^{2}	2

Final
7	(Czechoslovakia) Andrea Strnadová	6	6
6	(Australia) Kirrily Sharpe	2	4

=== Top half ===
==== Section 1 ====
First round
1	(Japan) Naoko Sawamatsu	6	6
(Zimbabwe) Alison Vaughan	0	1
(South Korea) Park Hye-jin	0	3
(Netherlands) Kristie Boogert	6	6
(Australia) Catherine Barclay	6	6
(China) Tang Li	3	0
(Chile) Melisa Castro	4	4
16	(Argentina) María José Gaidano	6	6
9	(West Germany) Barbara Rittner	6	6
(Japan) Kiyoko Yazawa	2	3
(Chile) Paula Cabezas	6	6
(Thailand) Krisna Summa	1	2
(Sweden) Catarina Bernstein	6	6
(Belgium) Katrien de Craemer	3	0
(South Africa) Cindy Summers	2	5
7	(Czechoslovakia) Andrea Strnadová	6	7

Second round
1	(Japan) N Sawamatsu	6	6
(Netherlands) K Boogert	1	3
(Australia) C Barclay	2	7^{7}	6
16	(Argentina) MJ Gaidano	6	6^{2}	3
9	(West Germany) B Rittner	7	6
(Chile) P Cabezas	5	4
(Sweden) C Bernstein	6	1	3
7	(Czechoslovakia) A Strnadová	1	6	6

Third round
1	(Japan) N Sawamatsu	6	2	6
(Australia) C Barclay	4	6	4
9	(West Germany) B Rittner	3	0
7	(Czechoslovakia) A Strnadová	6	6

Quarterfinals
1	(Japan) N Sawamatsu	6	0	3
7	(Czechoslovakia) A Strnadová	0	6	6

==== Section 2 ====
First round
4	(West Germany) Anke Huber	6	6
(Philippines) Jennifer Saret	1	3
(United Kingdom) Emily Bond	3	0
(Japan) Keiko Nagatomi	6	6
(United Kingdom) Caroline Herbert	2	5
(Denmark) Pernille Sørensen	6	7
(Czechoslovakia) Petra Kučová	6^{4}	1
13	(Czechoslovakia) Karina Habšudová	7^{7}	6
12	(Australia) Nicole Pratt	6^{3}	6	6
(Soviet Union) Tatiana Ignatieva	7^{7}	3	1
(South Africa) Gaynor Ford	4	5
(Luxembourg) Marie-Christine Goy	6	7
(Belgium) Daphne van de Zande	6	4	6
(United States) Nicole Hummel	1	6	4
(United Kingdom) Anna Sorkin	2	0
5	(Australia) Kristin Godridge	6	6

Second round
4	(West Germany) A Huber	6	6
(Japan) K Nagatomi	0	2
(Denmark) P Sørensen	2	7^{12}	6
13	(Czechoslovakia) K Habšudová	6	6^{10}	3
12	(Australia) N Pratt	3	6	6
(Luxembourg) M-C Goy	6	2	1
(Belgium) D van de Zande	2	0
5	(Australia) K Godridge	6	6

Third round
4	(West Germany) A Huber	6	6
(Denmark) P Sørensen	1	1
12	(Australia) N Pratt	3	1
5	(Australia) K Godridge	6	6

Quarterfinals
4	(West Germany) A Huber	6	6
5	(Australia) K Godridge	2	3

=== Bottom half ===
==== Section 3 ====
First round
6	(Australia) Kirrily Sharpe	6	6
(Finland) Marja-Liisa Kuurne	3	1
(United Kingdom) Shirli-Ann Siddall	1	0
(Soviet Union) Elena Makarova	6	6
(Venezuela) Eleonora Vegliante	5	1
(Soviet Union) Irina Sukhova	7	6
(United Kingdom) Virginia Humphreys-Davies	7	4	6
11	(Israel) Yael Segal	5	6	8
14	(Chinese Taipei) Wang Shi-ting	6	6
(Japan) Shizuka Tokiwa	0	3
(New Zealand) Jacqueline Gunthorp	3	5
(South Africa) Joannette Kruger	6	7
(United Kingdom) Sarah Bentley	5	5
(Japan) Kaoru Shibata	7	7
(United States) Lisa Raymond	1	2
3	(Bulgaria) Magdalena Maleeva	6	6

Second round
6	(Australia) K Sharpe	7	6
(Soviet Union) E Makarova	5	2
(Soviet Union) I Sukhova	4	6	1
11	(Israel) Y Segal	6	2	6
14	(Chinese Taipei) S-t Wang	3	4
(South Africa) J Kruger	6	6
(Japan) K Shibata	1	7	3
3	(Bulgaria) M Maleeva	6	5	6

Third round
6	(Australia) K Sharpe	6	6
11	(Israel) Y Segal	1	2
(South Africa) J Kruger	1	3
3	(Bulgaria) M Maleeva	6	6

Quarterfinals
6	(Australia) K Sharpe	6	4	7
3	(Bulgaria) M Maleeva	4	6	5

==== Section 4 ====
First round
8	(France) Noëlle van Lottum	6	6
(Romania) Aurora Gima	4	0
(South Korea) Park Sung-hee	5	6	6
(Socialist Federal Republic of Yugoslavia) Natalia Vojinović	7	2	2
(China) Li Tong	6^{5}	2
(United Kingdom) Caroline Hunt	7^{7}	6
(Israel) Limor Zaltz	7^{7}	2	4
10	(United States) Erika deLone	6^{3}	6	6
15	(Italy) Silvia Farina	6	4	6
(Canada) Monica Mraz	0	6	4
(Australia) Louise Stacey	6	6
(Colombia) Angela Bernal	2	2
(Thailand) Nutchanan Wimmonit	1	1
(United Kingdom) Julie Pullin	6	6
(Italy) Nathalie Baudone	3	6^{0}
16	(United States) Carrie Cunningham	6	7^{7}

Second round
8	(France) N van Lottum	7^{8}	6
(South Korea) S-h Park	6^{6}	3
(United Kingdom) C Hunt	1	5
10	(United States) E deLone	6	7
15	(Italy) S Farina	6	6
(Australia) L Stacey	3	4
(United Kingdom) J Pullin
16	(United States) C Cunningham	w/o

Third round
8	(France) N van Lottum	6	6
10	(United States) E deLone	4	4
15	(Italy) S Farina	6	6
(United Kingdom) J Pullin	1	1

Quarterfinals
8	(France) N van Lottum	5	6	6
15	(Italy) S Farina	7	3	0
