= 1990 Wimbledon Championships – Girls' doubles =

Girls' doubles
- 1990 Wimbledon Championships

Final
- Champions: (Czechoslovakia) Karina Habšudová (Czechoslovakia) Andrea Strnadová
- Runners-up: (Australia) Nicole Pratt (Australia) Kirrily Sharpe
- Score: 6–3, 6–2

Events
Singles	men	women		boys	girls
Doubles	men	women	mixed	boys	girls
WC Singles	men	women	quad
WC Doubles	men	women	quad
Legends	men	women	seniors
← 1989 ·	Wimbledon Championships	· 1991 →

Karina Habšudová and Andrea Strnadová defeated Nicole Pratt and Kirrily Sharpe in the final, 6–3, 6–2 to win the girls' doubles tennis title at the 1990 Wimbledon Championships.

== Seeds ==
The top 2 seeds received a bye into the second round.

1. (Australia) Kristin Godridge / (France) Noëlle van Lottum (semifinals)
2. (Australia) Nicole Pratt / (Australia) Kirrily Sharpe (final)
3. (Czechoslovakia) Karina Habšudová / (Czechoslovakia) Andrea Strnadová (champions)
4. (United States) Carrie Cunningham / (United States) Erika deLone (first round, withdrew)
5. (Australia) Catherine Barclay / (Australia) Louise Stacey (quarterfinals)
6. (Soviet Union) Tatiana Ignatieva / (Soviet Union) Irina Sukhova (quarterfinals)
7. (Sweden) Catarina Bernstein / (Denmark) Pernille Sørensen (second round)
8. (Australia) Justine Hodder / (United Kingdom) Virginia Humphreys-Davies (quarterfinals)

== Draw ==
=== Key ===
- Q = Qualifier
- WC = Wild card
- LL = Lucky loser
- Alt = Alternate
- SE = Special exempt
- PR = Protected ranking
- ITF = ITF entry
- JE = Junior exempt
- w/o = Walkover
- r = Retired
- d = Defaulted
- SR = Special ranking

=== Finals ===
Semifinals
1	(Australia) Kristin Godridge (France) Noëlle van Lottum	4	4
3	(Czechoslovakia) Karina Habšudová (Czechoslovakia) Andrea Strnadová	6	6
(Czechoslovakia) Petra Kučová (Chinese Taipei) Wang Shi-ting	2	4
2	(Australia) Nicole Pratt (Australia) Kirrily Sharpe	6	6

Final
3	(Czechoslovakia) Karina Habšudová (Czechoslovakia) Andrea Strnadová	6	6
(Australia) Nicole Pratt (Australia) Kirrily Sharpe	3	2

=== Top half ===
First round
(United Kingdom) Julie Pullin (United Kingdom) Shirli-Ann Siddall	2	3
(Soviet Union) Elena Makarova (Israel) Limor Zaltz	6	6
(Colombia) Angela Bernal (Finland) Marja-Liisa Kuurne	6	6
(Romania) Aurora Gima (Socialist Federal Republic of Yugoslavia) Natalia Vojinović	0	2
(United Kingdom) Victoria Graeme-Barber (United Kingdom) Anna Sorkin	3	1
8	(Australia) Justine Hodder (United Kingdom) Virginia Humphreys-Davies	6	6
3	(Czechoslovakia) Karina Habšudová (Czechoslovakia) Andrea Strnadová	6	6
(South Africa) Cindy Summers (South Africa) Theresa Swart	1	2
(Belgium) Katrien de Craemer (Poland) Anna Moll	4	1
(United Kingdom) Sarah Bentley (Luxembourg) Marie-Christine Goy	6	6
(United States) Nicole Hummel (United States) Lisa Raymond	6	6
(New Zealand) Jacqueline Gunthorp (South Korea) Park Hye-jin	2	3
(Chile) Paula Cabezas (Chile) Melisa Castro	2	1
5	(Australia) Catherine Barclay (Australia) Louise Stacey	6	6

Second round
1	(Australia) K Godridge (France) N van Lottum	6	6
(Soviet Union) E Makarova (Israel) L Zaltz	2	2
(Colombia) A Bernal (Finland) M-L Kuurne	5	5
8	(Australia) J Hodder (United Kingdom) V Humphreys-Davies	7	7
3	(Czechoslovakia) K Habšudová (Czechoslovakia) A Strnadová	6	6
(United Kingdom) S Bentley (Luxembourg) M-C Goy	0	1
(United States) N Hummel (United States) L Raymond	7	2	5
5	(Australia) C Barclay (Australia) L Stacey	5	6	7

Quarterfinals
1	(Australia) K Godridge (France) N van Lottum	6	6
8	(Australia) J Hodder (United Kingdom) V Humphreys-Davies	4	3
3	(Czechoslovakia) K Habšudová (Czechoslovakia) A Strnadová	6	6
5	(Australia) C Barclay (Australia) L Stacey	4	2

Semifinals
1	(Australia) K Godridge (France) N van Lottum	4	4
3	(Czechoslovakia) K Habšudová (Czechoslovakia) A Strnadová	6	6

=== Bottom half ===
First round
6	(Soviet Union) Tatiana Ignatieva (Soviet Union) Irina Sukhova	6	6
(South Korea) Park Sung-hee (Philippines) Jennifer Saret	1	4
(United Kingdom) Caroline Herbert (United Kingdom) Caroline Hunt	w/o
(China) Li Tong (China) Tang Li
(Thailand) Krisna Summa (Thailand) Nutchanan Wimmonit	6	6
(Argentina) María José Gaidano (Venezuela) Eleonora Vegliante	2	2
(Czechoslovakia) Petra Kučová (Chinese Taipei) Wang Shi-ting
4	(United States) Carrie Cunningham (United States) Erika deLone	w/o
7	(Sweden) Catarina Bernstein (Denmark) Pernille Sørensen	7^{7}	6^{2}	6
(Japan) Keiko Nagatomi (Japan) Shizuka Tokiwa	6^{2}	7^{7}	1
(United Kingdom) Emily Bond (Zimbabwe) Alison Vaughan	2	1
(Japan) Naoko Sawamatsu (Japan) Kaoru Shibata	6	6
(South Africa) Gaynor Ford (South Africa) Joannette Kruger	2	1
(Canada) Monica Mraz (Japan) Kiyoko Yazawa	6	6

Second round
6	(Soviet Union) T Ignatieva (Soviet Union) I Sukhova	6	6
(China) T Li (China) L Tang	2	1
(Thailand) K Summa (Thailand) N Wimmonit	1	1
(Czechoslovakia) P Kučová (Chinese Taipei) S-t Wang	6	6
7	(Sweden) C Bernstein (Denmark) P Sørensen	6^{1}	6^{5}
(Japan) N Sawamatsu (Japan) K Shibata	7	7
(Canada) M Mraz (Japan) K Yazawa	3	5
2	(Australia) Nicole Pratt (Australia) Kirrily Sharpe	6	7

Quarterfinals
6	(Soviet Union) T Ignatieva (Soviet Union) I Sukhova	3	2
(Czechoslovakia) P Kučová (Chinese Taipei) S-t Wang	6	6
(Japan) N Sawamatsu (Japan) K Shibata	2	1
2	(Australia) N Pratt (Australia) K Sharpe	6	6

Semifinals
(Czechoslovakia) P Kučová (Chinese Taipei) S-t Wang	2	4
2	(Australia) N Pratt (Australia) K Sharpe	6	6
