= 1990 Wimbledon Championships – Boys' singles =

Boys' singles
- 1990 Wimbledon Championships

Final
- Champion: (India) Leander Paes
- Runner-up: (South Africa) Marcos Ondruska
- Score: 7–5, 2–6, 6–4

Events
Singles	men	women		boys	girls
Doubles	men	women	mixed	boys	girls
WC Singles	men	women	quad
WC Doubles	men	women	quad
Legends	men	women	seniors
- Wimbledon Championships

Leander Paes defeated Marcos Ondruska in the final, 7–5, 2–6, 6–4 to win the boys' singles tennis title at the 1990 Wimbledon Championships.

== Seeds ==
1. (Czechoslovakia) Martin Damm (second round)
2. (South Africa) Marcos Ondruska (final)
3. (Mexico) Oliver Fernández (second round)
4. (Argentina) Hernán Gumy (third round)
5. (Canada) Sébastien Leblanc (third round)
6. (Soviet Union) Andriy Medvedev (third round)
7. (United States) Ivan Baron (semifinals)
8. (Czechoslovakia) Pavel Gazda (quarterfinals)
9. (Czechoslovakia) Jan Kodeš (first round)
10. (South Africa) Clinton Marsh (first round)
11. (India) Leander Paes (champion)
12. (Thailand) Narathorn Srichaphan (quarterfinals)
13. (Sweden) Mårten Renström (third round)
14. (Soviet Union) Andrei Rybalko (second round)
15. (Socialist Federal Republic of Yugoslavia) Saša Hiršzon (quarterfinals)
16. (Australia) Grant Doyle (second round)

Click on the seed number of a player to go to their draw section.

== Draw ==
Key

- Q = Qualifier
- WC = Wild card
- LL = Lucky loser
- Alt = Alternate
- ITF = ITF entry
- PR = Protected ranking
- SR = Special ranking
- SE = Special exempt
- JE = Junior exempt
- JR = Junior Accelerator Programme entrant
- CO = College Accelerator Programme entrant
- NG = Next Gen Accelerator Program entrant
- w/o = Walkover
- r = Retired
- d = Defaulted

=== Finals ===
Quarterfinals
15	(Socialist Federal Republic of Yugoslavia) Saša Hiršzon	3	6^{4}
7	(United States) Ivan Baron	6	7^{7}
(Australia) Paul Kilderry	6^{5}	0
11	(India) Leander Paes	7^{7}	6
12	(Thailand) Narathorn Srichaphan	3	7^{8}	2
(Australia) Joshua Eagle	6	6^{6}	6
8	(Czechoslovakia) Pavel Gazda	1	6	3
2	(South Africa) Marcos Ondruska	6	3	6

Semifinals
7	(United States) Ivan Baron	4	2
11	(India) Leander Paes	6	6
(Australia) Joshua Eagle	6^{2}	2
2	(South Africa) Marcos Ondruska	7^{7}	6

Final
11	(India) Leander Paes	7	2	6
2	(South Africa) Marcos Ondruska	5	6	4

=== Top half ===
==== Section 1 ====
First round
1	(Czechoslovakia) Martin Damm	6	6
(Thailand) Nathapol Ploysuk	2	1
(United Kingdom) Jonathan Haycock	6	6
(Belgium) Tom Vanhoudt	3	3
(Mexico) Ernesto Muñoz de Cote	6	6
(Norway) Christian Ruud	3	3
(United States) David Witt	4	6	7
15	(Socialist Federal Republic of Yugoslavia) Saša Hiršzon	6	4	9
10	(South Africa) Clinton Marsh	1	6^{8}
(United States) Chris Cocotos	6	7^{10}
(Argentina) Juan Garat	6	7
(Sri Lanka) Umesha Wallooppillai	4	5
(Italy) Laurence Tieleman	6	7^{7}
(Hungary) Gábor Németh	3	6^{3}
(South Korea) Im Ji-heon	3	6^{1}
7	(United States) Ivan Baron	6	7^{7}

Second round
1	(Czechoslovakia) M Damm	6	6^{5}	7
(United Kingdom) J Haycock	2	7^{7}	9
(Mexico) E Muñoz de Cote	4	4
15	(Socialist Federal Republic of Yugoslavia) S Hiršzon	6	6
(United States) C Cocotos	6	6
(Argentina) J Garat	3	4
(Italy) L Tieleman	4	2
7	(United States) I Baron	6	6

Third round
(United Kingdom) J Haycock	5	2
15	(Socialist Federal Republic of Yugoslavia) S Hiršzon	7	6
(United States) C Cocotos	6	6^{5}	4
7	(United States) I Baron	4	7^{7}	6

Quarterfinals
15	(Socialist Federal Republic of Yugoslavia) S Hiršzon	3	6^{4}
7	(United States) I Baron	6	7^{7}

==== Section 2 ====
First round
4	(Argentina) Hernán Gumy	6	6
(Japan) Natsuki Harada	4	1
(West Germany) Scott Gessner	6	7
(United States) Jon Leach	4	5
(Australia) Paul Kilderry	6	6
(Chile) Fernando Cabrera	2	4
(Uruguay) Joaquín Elola	2	4
14	(Soviet Union) Andrei Rybalko	6	6
11	(India) Leander Paes	6	6
(United Kingdom) Nick Adams	1	4
(Japan) Arata Ito	2	7	6
(Chile) Marcelo Achondo	6	5	4
(Sweden) Mikael Tillström	4	6	6
(Czechoslovakia) Lukáš Hovorka	6	3	3
(Venezuela) Dante Magnoni	2	4
5	(Canada) Sébastien Leblanc	6	6

Second round
4	(Argentina) H Gumy	6	6
(West Germany) S Gessner	4	3
(Australia) P Kilderry	6	6
14	(Soviet Union) A Rybalko	3	4
11	(India) L Paes	6	6
(Japan) A Ito	3	4
(Sweden) M Tillström	3	6^{4}
5	(Canada) S Leblanc	6	7^{7}

Third round
4	(Argentina) H Gumy	0	2
(Australia) P Kilderry	6	6
11	(India) L Paes	5	6	6
5	(Canada) S Leblanc	7	3	0

Quarterfinals
(Australia) P Kilderry	6^{5}	0
11	(India) L Paes	7^{7}	6

=== Bottom half ===
==== Section 3 ====
First round
6	(Soviet Union) Andriy Medvedev	6	2	6
(Australia) Jamie Holmes	3	6	4
(Japan) Hideki Kaneko	7	6
(South Africa) John-Laffnie de Jager	5	2
(United Kingdom) Giles Gibson	6^{3}	6	6
(Ecuador) Pablo Campana	7^{7}	3	4
(Haiti) Bertrand Madsen	4	1
12	(Thailand) Narathorn Srichaphan	6	6
13	(Sweden) Mårten Renström	7	6
(Indonesia) Teddy Tandjung	5	1
(United Kingdom) Andrew Foster	6	2	8
(Switzerland) Ignace Rotman	4	6	10
(Australia) Joshua Eagle	6	6
(Japan) Terumasa Hioki	4	1
(Zimbabwe) Wayne Black	2	0
3	(Mexico) Oliver Fernández	6	6

Second round
6	(Soviet Union) A Medvedev	6	6
(Japan) H Kaneko	1	4
(United Kingdom) G Gibson	4	2
12	(Thailand) N Srichaphan	6	6
13	(Sweden) M Renström	7^{8}	6
(Switzerland) I Rotman	6^{6}	4
(Australia) J Eagle	7^{7}	6
3	(Mexico) O Fernández	6^{4}	0

Third round
6	(Soviet Union) A Medvedev	7	2	3
12	(Thailand) N Srichaphan	5	6	6
13	(Sweden) M Renström	3	1
(Australia) J Eagle	6	6

Quarterfinals
12	(Thailand) N Srichaphan	3	7^{8}	2
(Australia) J Eagle	6	6^{6}	6

==== Section 4 ====
First round
8	(Czechoslovakia) Pavel Gazda	4	6	8
(Ecuador) Luis Morejón	6	3	6
(United Kingdom) John Barton	2	6	6
(New Zealand) Alistair Hunt	6	2	3
(Egypt) Tamer El-Sawy	4	6	6
(Sweden) Johan Alvén	6	1	4
(United States) Brian MacPhie	6	6
9	(Czechoslovakia) Jan Kodeš	3	1
16	(Australia) Grant Doyle	4	6	7
(Belgium) Filip Dewulf	6	4	5
(Canada) Sébastien Lareau	6	6^{9}	3
(Denmark) Kenneth Carlsen	4	7^{11}	6
(Indonesia) Benny Wijaya	2	7	7
(Chile) Patricio Delgado	6	5	5
(Mexico) Óscar Ortiz	2	7^{8}	4
2	(South Africa) Marcos Ondruska	6	6^{6}	6

Second round
8	(Czechoslovakia) P Gazda	6	6
(United Kingdom) J Barton	4	2
(Egypt) T El-Sawy	6	3	2
(United States) B MacPhie	2	6	6
16	(Australia) G Doyle	0^{r}
(Denmark) K Carlsen	1
(Indonesia) B Wijaya	2	0
2	(South Africa) M Ondruska	6	6

Third round
8	(Czechoslovakia) P Gazda	7	4	6
(United States) B MacPhie	5	6	3
(Denmark) K Carlsen	4	6	2
2	(South Africa) M Ondruska	6	1	6

Quarterfinals
8	(Czechoslovakia) P Gazda	1	6	3
2	(South Africa) M Ondruska	6	3	6
