= 1990 Wimbledon Championships – Boys' doubles =

Boys' doubles
- 1990 Wimbledon Championships

Final
- Champions: (Canada) Sébastien Lareau (Canada) Sébastien Leblanc
- Runners-up: (South Africa) Clinton Marsh (South Africa) Marcos Ondruska
- Score: 7–6^{(7–5)}, 4–6, 6–3

Events
Singles	men	women		boys	girls
Doubles	men	women	mixed	boys	girls
WC Singles	men	women	quad
WC Doubles	men	women	quad
Legends	men	women	seniors
- Wimbledon Championships

Sébastien Lareau and Sébastien Leblanc defeated Clinton Marsh and Marcos Ondruska in the final, 7–6^{(7–5)}, 4–6, 6–3 to win the boys' doubles tennis title at the 1990 Wimbledon Championships.

== Seeds ==
1. (Canada) Sébastien Lareau / (Canada) Sébastien Leblanc (champions)
2. (South Africa) Johan de Beer / (South Africa) John-Laffnie de Jager (quarterfinals)
3. (Mexico) Oliver Fernández / (Mexico) Ernesto Muñoz de Cote (quarterfinals)
4. (New Zealand) Alistair Hunt / (India) Leander Paes (first round)
5. (South Africa) Clinton Marsh / (South Africa) Marcos Ondruska (final)
6. (Czechoslovakia) Martin Damm / (Czechoslovakia) Jan Kodeš (quarterfinals)
7. (United States) Jon Leach / (United States) Brian MacPhie (semifinals)
8. (Socialist Federal Republic of Yugoslavia) Saša Hiršzon / (Sweden) Mårten Renström (quarterfinals)

== Draw ==
Key

- Q = Qualifier
- WC = Wild card
- LL = Lucky loser
- Alt = Alternate
- ITF = ITF entry
- PR = Protected ranking
- SR = Special ranking
- SE = Special exempt
- JE = Junior exempt
- JR = Junior Accelerator Programme entrant
- CO = College Accelerator Programme entrant
- NG = Next Gen Accelerator Program entrant
- w/o = Walkover
- r = Retired
- d = Defaulted

=== Finals ===
Semifinals
1	(Canada) Sébastien Lareau (Canada) Sébastien Leblanc	6	3	6
(Australia) Jamie Holmes (Australia) Paul Kilderry	4	6	4
5	(South Africa) Clinton Marsh (South Africa) Marcos Ondruska	6	7
7	(United States) Jon Leach (United States) Brian MacPhie	4	5

Final
1	(Canada) Sébastien Lareau (Canada) Sébastien Leblanc	7^{7}	4	6
5	(South Africa) Clinton Marsh (South Africa) Marcos Ondruska	6^{5}	6	3

=== Top half ===
First round
1	(Canada) Sébastien Lareau (Canada) Sébastien Leblanc	6	6
(Venezuela) Dante Magnoni (Ecuador) Luis Morejón	3	1
(Chile) Fernando Cabrera (United Kingdom) Giles Gibson	6	6^{3}	2
(Sweden) Johan Alvén (Sweden) Mikael Tillström	4	7^{7}	6
(United Kingdom) Andrew Foster (United Kingdom) Jonathan Haycock	6	4	6
(Japan) Natsuki Harada (Japan) Hideki Kaneko	2	6	2
(United States) Ivan Baron (West Germany) Scott Gessner	4	3
8	(Socialist Federal Republic of Yugoslavia) Saša Hiršzon (Sweden) Mårten Renström	6	6
4	(New Zealand) Alistair Hunt (India) Leander Paes	3	4
(Australia) Jamie Holmes (Australia) Paul Kilderry	6	6
(United Kingdom) John Barton (United Kingdom) Andrew Moir	3	7	1
(Hungary) Gábor Németh (Switzerland) Ignace Rotman	6	5	6
(Japan) Terumasa Hioki (Japan) Arata Ito	6	6
(Czechoslovakia) Pavel Gazda (Czechoslovakia) Lukáš Hovorka	4	1
(Belgium) Filip Dewulf (Belgium) Tom Vanhoudt	3	6^{4}
6	(Czechoslovakia) Martin Damm (Czechoslovakia) Jan Kodeš	6	7^{7}

Second round
1	(Canada) S Lareau (Canada) S Leblanc	6	6
(Sweden) J Alvén (Sweden) M Tillström	4	2
(United Kingdom) A Foster (United Kingdom) J Haycock	7	2	4
8	(Socialist Federal Republic of Yugoslavia) S Hiršzon (Sweden) M Renström	5	6	6
(Australia) J Holmes (Australia) P Kilderry	6	6
(Hungary) G Németh (Switzerland) I Rotman	2	4
(Japan) T Hioki (Japan) A Ito	4	2
6	(Czechoslovakia) M Damm (Czechoslovakia) J Kodeš	6	6

Quarterfinals
1	(Canada) S Lareau (Canada) S Leblanc	5	7^{9}	6
8	(Socialist Federal Republic of Yugoslavia) S Hiršzon (Sweden) M Renström	7	6^{7}	2
(Australia) J Holmes (Australia) P Kilderry	3	6	11
6	(Czechoslovakia) M Damm (Czechoslovakia) J Kodeš	6	0	9

Semifinals
1	(Canada) S Lareau (Canada) S Leblanc	6	3	6
(Australia) J Holmes (Australia) P Kilderry	4	6	4

=== Bottom half ===
First round
5	(South Africa) Clinton Marsh (South Africa) Marcos Ondruska	1	7^{7}	9
(Denmark) Kenneth Carlsen (Norway) Christian Ruud	6	6^{1}	7
(United States) Chris Cocotos (United States) David Witt	6	6
(United Kingdom) Nick Adams (United Kingdom) David Draper	3	4
(Ecuador) Pablo Campana (Italy) Laurence Tieleman	6^{2}	7	6
(Zimbabwe) Wayne Black (South Korea) Im Ji-heon	7^{7}	5	4
(Argentina) Hernán Gumy (Mexico) Óscar Ortiz	1	4
3	(Mexico) Oliver Fernández (Mexico) Ernesto Muñoz de Cote	6	6
7	(United States) Jon Leach (United States) Brian MacPhie	6	6
(Thailand) Nathapol Ploysuk (Indonesia) Teddy Tandjung	1	3
(Egypt) Tamer El-Sawy (Haiti) Bertrand Madsen	w/o
(Thailand) Narathorn Srichaphan (Indonesia) Benny Wijaya
(United Kingdom) Richard Holden (United Kingdom) Miles Maclagan	6	3	12
(Chile) Marcelo Achondo (Chile) Patricio Delgado	4	6	10
(Soviet Union) Andriy Medvedev (Soviet Union) Andrei Rybalko	6^{2}	2
2	(South Africa) Johan de Beer (South Africa) John-Laffnie de Jager	7^{7}	6

Second round
5	(South Africa) C Marsh (South Africa) M Ondruska	6	6
(United States) C Cocotos (United States) D Witt	3	3
(Ecuador) P Campana (Italy) L Tieleman	2	1
3	(Mexico) O Fernández (Mexico) E Muñoz de Cote	6	6
7	(United States) J Leach (United States) B MacPhie	6^{4}	6	6
(Thailand) N Srichaphan (Indonesia) B Wijaya	7^{7}	1	2
(United Kingdom) R Holden (United Kingdom) M Maclagan	5	6	3
2	(South Africa) J de Beer (South Africa) J-L de Jager	7	4	6

Quarterfinals
5	(South Africa) C Marsh (South Africa) M Ondruska	3	6	6
3	(Mexico) O Fernández (Mexico) E Muñoz de Cote	6	4	4
7	(United States) J Leach (United States) B MacPhie	6	6
2	(South Africa) J de Beer (South Africa) J-L de Jager	4	2

Semifinals
5	(South Africa) C Marsh (South Africa) M Ondruska	6	7
7	(United States) J Leach (United States) B MacPhie	4	5
