= 1992 US Open – Women's singles qualifying =

Women's singles qualifying
- 1992 US Open

Events
Singles	men	women		boys	girls
Doubles	men	women	mixed	boys	girls
WC Singles	men	women	quad
WC Doubles	men	women	quad
Legends	men	women	mixed

Qualification
Singles	men	women
- US Open

The qualifying rounds for the 1992 US Open were played in late August 1992 at the USTA National Tennis Center in Flushing Meadows, New York City, United States.

== Seeds ==
1. (Argentina) Patricia Tarabini (first round)
2. (Commonwealth of Independent States) Elena Brioukhovets (first round)
3. (Czechoslovakia) Petra Langrová (first round)
4. (Japan) Rika Hiraki (second round)
5. (Germany) Karin Kschwendt (first round)
6. (Czechoslovakia) Petra Holubová (second round)
7. (Japan) Akiko Kijimuta (second round)
8. (France) Nathalie Herreman (second round)
9. (Italy) Silvia Farina (first round)
10. (Netherlands) Miriam Oremans (second round)
11. (Italy) Francesca Romano (first round)
12. (Australia) Nicole Pratt (second round)
13. (Belgium) Sandra Wasserman (second round)
14. (United States) Jennifer Santrock (first round)
15. (Australia) Michelle Jaggard-Lai (first round)
16. (Australia) Louise Field (first round)

== Qualifiers ==
1. (Austria) Beate Reinstadler
2. (United States) Nicole London
3. (United Kingdom) Clare Wood
4. (United States) Nicole Arendt
5. (United States) Shaun Stafford
6. (France) Alexandra Fusai
7. (United States) Camille Benjamin
8. (Commonwealth of Independent States) Viktoria Milvidskaia

== Lucky loser ==
1. (Japan) Kyōko Nagatsuka

== Draw ==
=== First qualifier ===
First round
1	(Argentina) Patricia Tarabini	3	2
(Austria) Beate Reinstadler	6	6
(United States) Heather Ludloff	6	7
WC	(United States) Stella Sampras	1	5
(Argentina) Cristina Tessi	1	1
(United States) Aurora Gima	6	6
(Australia) Jo-Anne Faull	4	2
10	(Netherlands) Miriam Oremans	6	6

Second round
(Austria) Beate Reinstadler	6	6
(United States) Heather Ludloff	2	2
(United States) Aurora Gima	7^{7}	1	7^{7}
10	(Netherlands) Miriam Oremans	6^{5}	6	6^{5}

Qualifying competition
(Austria) Beate Reinstadler	6	3	6
(United States) Aurora Gima	1	6	4

=== Second qualifier ===
First round
12	(Australia) Nicole Pratt	6	6
(United States) Pam Nelson	3	4
(Canada) Maureen Drake	4	2
WC	(United States) Nicole London	6	6
(United Kingdom) Sarah Loosemore	1	1
(United States) Jolene Watanabe	6	6
WC	(United States) Patti O'Reilly	5	3
6	(Czechoslovakia) Petra Holubová	7	6

Second round
12	(Australia) Nicole Pratt	6^{1}	2
WC	(United States) Nicole London	7^{7}	6
(United States) Jolene Watanabe	6	6
6	(Czechoslovakia) Petra Holubová	1	4

Qualifying competition
WC	(United States) Nicole London	6	5	6
(United States) Jolene Watanabe	3	7	3

=== Third qualifier ===
First round
4	(Japan) Rika Hiraki	6	4	6
(Japan) Miki Yokobori	4	6	1
(New Zealand) Julie Richardson	6	6
(Romania) Irina Spîrlea	3	1
WC	(United States) Rachel Jensen	2	3
(United Kingdom) Clare Wood	6	6
(Argentina) María Luciana Reynares	7	6
14	(United States) Jennifer Santrock	5	4

Second round
4	(Japan) Rika Hiraki	3	4
(New Zealand) Julie Richardson	6	6
(United Kingdom) Clare Wood	3	7	6
(Argentina) María Luciana Reynares	6	5	1

Qualifying competition
(New Zealand) Julie Richardson	3	1
(United Kingdom) Clare Wood	6	6

=== Fourth qualifier ===
First round
15	(Australia) Michelle Jaggard-Lai	3	3
(Commonwealth of Independent States) Tatiana Ignatieva	6	6
(United States) Teri Whitlinger	7	7
(Netherlands) Esmir Hoogendoorn	5	5
(United States) Nicole Arendt	6	6
(United States) Cammy MacGregor	4	1
(United Kingdom) Shirli-Ann Siddall	3	3
7	(Japan) Akiko Kijimuta	6	6

Second round
(Commonwealth of Independent States) Tatiana Ignatieva	6	6
(United States) Teri Whitlinger	3	4
(United States) Nicole Arendt	6	6
7	(Japan) Akiko Kijimuta	4	1

Qualifying competition
(Commonwealth of Independent States) Tatiana Ignatieva	2	3
(United States) Nicole Arendt	6	6

=== Fifth qualifier ===
First round
8	(France) Nathalie Herreman	6	6
WC	(United States) Luanne Spadea	0	2
(United States) Elise Burgin	6^{8}	4
(Japan) Kyōko Nagatsuka	7^{10}	6
(United States) Shaun Stafford	6	6
(Japan) Ai Sugiyama	2	2
(South Africa) Tessa Price	5	6	6
16	(Australia) Louise Field	7	2	2

Second round
8	(France) Nathalie Herreman	6	5	6^{4}
(Japan) Kyōko Nagatsuka	4	7	7^{7}
(United States) Shaun Stafford	6	5	6
(South Africa) Tessa Price	3	7	2

Qualifying competition
(Japan) Kyōko Nagatsuka	3	1
(United States) Shaun Stafford	6	6

=== Sixth qualifier ===
First round
9	(Italy) Silvia Farina	7	6^{4}	5
WC	(United States) Nicole Hummel	5	7^{7}	7
(Japan) Nana Miyagi	6	6
(Israel) Ilana Berger	3	1
(France) Alexandra Fusai	6	6
(United States) Erika deLone	4	2
WC	(United States) Jeri Ingram	6^{5}	6	6
3	(Czechoslovakia) Petra Langrová	7^{7}	4	2

Second round
WC	(United States) Nicole Hummel	5	6	7^{8}
(Japan) Nana Miyagi	7	3	6^{6}
(France) Alexandra Fusai	6	6
WC	(United States) Jeri Ingram	1	1

Qualifying competition
WC	(United States) Nicole Hummel	4	3
(France) Alexandra Fusai	6	6

=== Seventh qualifier ===
First round
5	(Germany) Karin Kschwendt	3	4
(United States) Ann Henricksson	6	6
WC	(United States) Anne Miller	5	2
(United States) Camille Benjamin	7	6
(Israel) Anna Smashnova	2	0
(Netherlands) Kristie Boogert	6	6
(Mexico) Angélica Gavaldón	6	1	6
11	(Italy) Francesca Romano	3	6	3

Second round
(United States) Ann Henricksson	6	3	5
(United States) Camille Benjamin	1	6	7
(Netherlands) Kristie Boogert	2	5
(Mexico) Angélica Gavaldón	6	7

Qualifying competition
(United States) Camille Benjamin	6	6
(Mexico) Angélica Gavaldón	4	2

=== Eighth qualifier ===
First round
13	(Belgium) Sandra Wasserman	6	6
(France) Nathalie Housset Gilbert	3	3
(Commonwealth of Independent States) Viktoria Milvidskaia	7^{7}	2	6
(New Zealand) Claudine Toleafoa	6^{5}	6	1
(France) Catherine Suire	6	6
(Australia) Kerry-Anne Guse	4	2
(Netherlands) Claire Wegink	6	6
2	(Commonwealth of Independent States) Elena Brioukhovets	2	4

Second round
13	(Belgium) Sandra Wasserman	3	3
(Commonwealth of Independent States) Viktoria Milvidskaia	6	6
(France) Catherine Suire	1	0
(Netherlands) Claire Wegink	6	6

Qualifying competition
(Commonwealth of Independent States) Viktoria Milvidskaia	6	6
(Netherlands) Claire Wegink	2	4
