= 1990 Wimbledon Championships – Women's singles =

Women's singles
- 1990 Wimbledon Championships

Final
- Champion: (United States) Martina Navratilova
- Runner-up: (United States) Zina Garrison
- Score: 6–4, 6–1

Details
- Draw: 128 (8 Q / 8 WC )
- Seeds: 16

Events
Singles	men	women		boys	girls
Doubles	men	women	mixed	boys	girls
WC Singles	men	women	quad
WC Doubles	men	women	quad
Legends	men	women	seniors
← 1989 ·	Wimbledon Championships	· 1991 →

Martina Navratilova defeated Zina Garrison in the final, 6–4, 6–1 to win the ladies' singles tennis title at the 1990 Wimbledon Championships. It was her record ninth Wimbledon singles title and 18th and last major singles title overall, tying Chris Evert's Open Era record. It was also her ninth consecutive Wimbledon final. For the fourth time in her career, Navratilova did not lose a set during the tournament.

Steffi Graf was the two-time defending champion, but lost in the semifinals to Garrison. This marked the first time since the 1987 Australian Open that Graf did not reach a major final, ending a record stretch of 13 consecutive appearances.

By defeating Monica Seles in the quarterfinals, Garrison ended the former's 36-match winning streak, extending back to Miami earlier that year.

== Seeds ==
1. (West Germany) Steffi Graf (semifinals)
2. (United States) Martina Navratilova (champion)
3. (Socialist Federal Republic of Yugoslavia) Monica Seles (quarterfinals)
4. (Argentina) Gabriela Sabatini (semifinals)
5. (United States) Zina Garrison (final)
6. (Spain) Arantxa Sánchez Vicario (first round)
7. (Bulgaria) Katerina Maleeva (quarterfinals)
8. (Switzerland) Manuela Maleeva-Fragnière (first round)
9. (United States) Mary Joe Fernández (withdrew)
10. (Czechoslovakia) Helena Suková (fourth round)
11. (Soviet Union) Natasha Zvereva (quarterfinals)
12. (United States) Jennifer Capriati (fourth round)
13. (Czechoslovakia) Jana Novotná (quarterfinals)
14. (Austria) Judith Wiesner (fourth round)
15. (South Africa) Rosalyn Fairbank (second round)
16. (Austria) Barbara Paulus (first round)

Click on the seed number of a player to go to their draw section.

Mary Joe Fernández withdrew due to a knee injury. She was replaced in the draw by lucky loser Anna Ivan.

== Draw ==
=== Key ===
- Q = Qualifier
- WC = Wild card
- LL = Lucky loser
- Alt = Alternate
- ITF = ITF entry
- PR = Protected ranking
- SR = Special ranking
- SE = Special exempt
- JE = Junior exempt
- JR = Junior Accelerator Programme entrant
- CO = College Accelerator Programme entrant
- NG = Next Gen Accelerator Program entrant
- w/o = Walkover
- r = Retired
- d = Defaulted

=== Finals ===
Quarterfinals
1	(West Germany) Steffi Graf	7	6
13	(Czechoslovakia) Jana Novotná	5	2
3	(Socialist Federal Republic of Yugoslavia) Monica Seles	6	3	7
5	(United States) Zina Garrison	3	6	9
11	(Soviet Union) Natasha Zvereva	2	6	6
4	(Argentina) Gabriela Sabatini	6	2	8
7	(Bulgaria) Katerina Maleeva	1	1
2	(United States) Martina Navratilova	6	6

Semifinals
1	(West Germany) Steffi Graf	3	6	4
5	(United States) Zina Garrison	6	3	6
4	(Argentina) Gabriela Sabatini	3	4
2	(United States) Martina Navratilova	6	6

Final
5	(United States) Zina Garrison	4	1
2	(United States) Martina Navratilova	6	6

=== Top half ===
==== Section 1 ====
First round
1	(West Germany) S Graf	6	6
(West Germany) C Porwik	1	2
Q	(Soviet Union) E Brioukhovets	1	2
(United States) M McGrath	6	6
(West Germany) C Kohde-Kilsch	4	6	6
(Argentina) M Paz	6	1	1
Q	(Australia) R Stubbs	7	5	6
(United States) D Faber	5	7	8
(Japan) N Miyagi	2	1
(United States) R White	6	6
(Bulgaria) M Maleeva	6^{3}	6	6
(Sweden) C Lindqvist	7^{7}	4	2
(France) J Halard	7	6
WC	(United States) K Jordan	5	2
(Canada) H Kelesi	3	1
12	(United States) J Capriati	6	6

Second round
1	(West Germany) S Graf	6	6
(United States) M McGrath	3	0
(West Germany) C Kohde-Kilsch	6	6
(United States) D Faber	2	0
(United States) R White	4	7	6
(Bulgaria) M Maleeva	6	5	4
(France) J Halard	2	6^{2}
12	(United States) J Capriati	6	7^{7}

Third round
1	(West Germany) S Graf	6	6
(West Germany) C Kohde-Kilsch	0	4
(United States) R White	5	7^{7}	3
12	(United States) J Capriati	7	6^{1}	6

Fourth round
1	(West Germany) S Graf	6	6
12	(United States) J Capriati	2	4

==== Section 2 ====
First round
13	(Czechoslovakia) J Novotná	3	7^{7}	6
(Italy) L Golarsa	6	6^{4}	2
WC	(United Kingdom) B Borneo	6	2	9
(United States) C Cunningham	4	6	11
(Australia) J-A Faull	6	6
(Czechoslovakia) P Langrová	2	1
Q	(South Africa) R Field	3	2
(United States) T Whitlinger	6	6
(United States) S Sloane	1	7^{7}	6
(Italy) L Ferrando	6	6^{5}	3
(United States) N Hu	5	5
(United States) P Fendick	7	7
(Czechoslovakia) J Pospíšilová	3	5
(Mexico) A Gavaldón	6	7
WC	(United Kingdom) S Gomer	6	6
8	(Switzerland) M Maleeva-Fragnière	2	3

Second round
13	(Czechoslovakia) J Novotná	6	6
(United States) C Cunningham	2	1
(Australia) J-A Faull	6	6
(United States) T Whitlinger	2	3
(United States) S Sloane	2	4
(United States) P Fendick	6	6
(Mexico) A Gavaldón	7	0	7
WC	(United Kingdom) S Gomer	5	6	5

Third round
13	(Czechoslovakia) J Novotná	6	6
(Australia) J-A Faull	2	1
(United States) P Fendick	6	6
(Mexico) A Gavaldón	1	1

Fourth round
13	(Czechoslovakia) J Novotná	6	6
(United States) P Fendick	2	4

==== Section 3 ====
First round
3	(Socialist Federal Republic of Yugoslavia) M Seles	6	6
(Sweden) M Strandlund	2	0
(United States) C Benjamin	6	6
(Italy) A-M Cecchini	3	1
(United States) T Phelps	6	2	6
(New Zealand) B Cordwell	2	6	2
(Australia) A Minter	6	6
WC	(United Kingdom) J Salmon	2	2
(Australia) H Mandlíková	6	3	11
(Italy) L Lapi	3	6	9
(United States) M Werdel	5	2
(United States) A Henricksson	7	6
(Japan) E Inoue	0	4
(South Africa) E Reinach	6	6
(United Kingdom) S Loosemore	6	3	6
16	(Austria) B Paulus	2	6	4

Second round
3	(Socialist Federal Republic of Yugoslavia) M Seles	6	7
(United States) C Benjamin	3	5
(United States) T Phelps	0	1
(Australia) A Minter	6	6
(Australia) H Mandlíková	3	3
(United States) A Henricksson	6	6
(South Africa) E Reinach	6	7
(United Kingdom) S Loosemore	3	5

Third round
3	(Socialist Federal Republic of Yugoslavia) M Seles	6	6
(Australia) A Minter	3	3
(United States) A Henricksson	3	6	6
(South Africa) E Reinach	6	3	3

Fourth round
3	(Socialist Federal Republic of Yugoslavia) M Seles	6	6
(United States) A Henricksson	1	0

==== Section 4 ====
First round
10	(Czechoslovakia) H Suková	7	6
(Netherlands) M Bollegraf	5	2
(Netherlands) N Jagerman	6	6
(Czechoslovakia) R Zrubáková	4	1
(West Germany) V Martinek	1	0
(Australia) N Provis	6	6
(Japan) N Sawamatsu	5	6	3
(France) A Dechaume	7	2	6
(Italy) L Garrone	6	6
(Italy) S La Fratta	2	4
(Brazil) A Vieira	3	5
(United States) A Leand	6	7
LL	(United States) J Santrock	4	1
(Sweden) C Dahlman	6	6
WC	(United Kingdom) S Smith	2	1
5	(United States) Z Garrison	6	6

Second round
10	(Czechoslovakia) H Suková	6	4	7
(Netherlands) N Jagerman	4	6	5
(Australia) N Provis	6	3	2
(France) A Dechaume	3	6	6
(Italy) L Garrone	7	4	5
(United States) A Leand	5	6	7
(Sweden) C Dahlman	2	1
5	(United States) Z Garrison	6	6

Third round
10	(Czechoslovakia) H Suková	6	6
(France) A Dechaume	4	3
(United States) A Leand	0	3
5	(United States) Z Garrison	6	6

Fourth round
10	(Czechoslovakia) H Suková	3	3
5	(United States) Z Garrison	6	6

=== Bottom half ===
==== Section 5 ====
First round
6	(Spain) A Sánchez Vicario	6	6^{8}	7
(United States) E Nagelsen	1	7^{10}	9
(South Africa) D van Rensburg	6	7^{8}
(United States) W Prausa	2	6^{6}
(Hungary) A Temesvári	2	0
(Netherlands) B Schultz	6	6
(Italy) R Reggi	6^{5}	6^{4}
(Australia) R McQuillan	7^{7}	7^{7}
(United States) G Magers	6	7^{8}
(Australia) E Smylie	1	6^{6}
Q	(United States) K Adams	7	4	3
(Soviet Union) L Savchenko	5	6	6
(Puerto Rico) G Fernández	6	6
(Argentina) F Labat	2	2
(United States) M Louie Harper	3	3
11	(Soviet Union) N Zvereva	6	6

Second round
(United States) E Nagelsen	2	6	6
(South Africa) D van Rensburg	6	4	2
(Netherlands) B Schultz	6	3	7
(Australia) R McQuillan	4	6	5
(United States) G Magers	6	6
(Soviet Union) L Savchenko	3	4
(Puerto Rico) G Fernández	6^{4}	4
11	(Soviet Union) N Zvereva	7^{7}	6

Third round
(United States) E Nagelsen	1	4
(Netherlands) B Schultz	6	6
(United States) G Magers	6	2	4
11	(Soviet Union) N Zvereva	2	6	6

Fourth round
(Netherlands) B Schultz	2	2
11	(Soviet Union) N Zvereva	6	6

==== Section 6 ====
First round
15	(South Africa) R Fairbank	6	3	6
LL	(Poland) R Barański	2	6	2
(United States) A Frazier	6	6
(France) I Demongeot	1	4
(France) N Tauziat	6	6
(Australia) L Field	1	1
(United Kingdom) M Javer	5	1
Q	(West Germany) E Pfaff	7	6
(France) C Tanvier	6	6
(Czechoslovakia) E Švíglerová	2	4
(West Germany) W Probst	2	6	7
Q	(United States) H Ludloff	6	4	5
(West Germany) A Huber	7	4	6
WC	(United Kingdom) J Durie	5	6	2
(United States) E Burgin	3	3
4	(Argentina) G Sabatini	6	6

Second round
15	(South Africa) R Fairbank	4	3
(United States) A Frazier	6	6
(France) N Tauziat	6	6
Q	(West Germany) E Pfaff	2	1
(France) C Tanvier	6	6
Q	(United States) H Ludloff	3	4
(West Germany) A Huber	2	6^{6}
4	(Argentina) G Sabatini	6	7^{8}

Third round
(United States) A Frazier	6	2	5
(France) N Tauziat	3	6	7
(France) C Tanvier	4	2
4	(Argentina) G Sabatini	6	6

Fourth round
(France) N Tauziat	2	6^{1}
4	(Argentina) G Sabatini	6	7^{7}

==== Section 7 ====
First round
7	(Bulgaria) K Maleeva	6	6
(Italy) B Romanò	2	4
(Japan) K Date	7^{8}	6
(United States) S Stafford	6^{6}	3
(West Germany) S Meier	2	1
(United States) L Harvey-Wild	6	6
WC	(United Kingdom) A Simpkin	6^{5}	5
Q	(Belgium) A Devries	7^{7}	7
(United States) L McNeil	6	3	6
(Italy) K Piccolini	1	6	1
(Soviet Union) N Medvedeva	6	2	1
(South Africa) A Coetzer	4	6	6
(United States) A Grossman	6	6
(United States) M-L Daniels	2	1
(France) N Herreman	7	6
LL	(United States) A Ivan	5	3

Second round
7	(Bulgaria) K Maleeva	6	6
(Japan) K Date	1	4
(United States) L Harvey-Wild	5	2
Q	(Belgium) A Devries	7	6
(United States) L McNeil	6	6
(South Africa) A Coetzer	3	2
(United States) A Grossman	0	2
(France) N Herreman	6	6

Third round
7	(Bulgaria) K Maleeva	6	6
Q	(Belgium) A Devries	2	0
(United States) L McNeil	4	3
(France) N Herreman	6	6

Fourth round
7	(Bulgaria) K Maleeva	6	6
(France) N Herreman	3	0

==== Section 8 ====
First round
14	(Austria) J Wiesner	6	6
(Belgium) S Wasserman	3	0
(France) K Quentrec	3	6	6
(Soviet Union) L Meskhi	6	3	2
(Peru) L Gildemeister	6	6
(Japan) M Kidowaki	3	3
(Czechoslovakia) R Rajchrtová	7	6^{2}	6
(United States) A Keller	5	7^{7}	4
(United States) C MacGregor	3	6	3
LL	(France) P Etchemendy	6	3	6
(United States) K Rinaldi	3	6	2
Q	(Luxembourg) K Kschwendt	6	2	6
(United States) A Smith	6	4	6
WC	(United Kingdom) C Wood	3	6	2
(France) S Amiach	1	1
2	(United States) M Navratilova	6	6

Second round
14	(Austria) J Wiesner	6	6
(France) K Quentrec	3	3
(Peru) L Gildemeister	6	6
(Czechoslovakia) R Rajchrtová	2	2
LL	(France) P Etchemendy	6^{2}	6	0
Q	(Luxembourg) K Kschwendt	7^{7}	1	6
(United States) A Smith	2	3
2	(United States) M Navratilova	6	6

Third round
14	(Austria) J Wiesner	6	7^{7}
(Peru) L Gildemeister	2	6^{5}
Q	(Luxembourg) K Kschwendt	1	1
2	(United States) M Navratilova	6	6

Fourth round
14	(Austria) J Wiesner	3	3
2	(United States) M Navratilova	6	6

Preceded by 1990 French Open – Women's singles	Grand Slam women's singles	Succeeded by 1990 US Open – Women's singles
