= 1990 Wimbledon Championships – Men's doubles =

Men's doubles
- 1990 Wimbledon Championships

Final
- Champions: (United States) Rick Leach (United States) Jim Pugh
- Runners-up: (South Africa) Pieter Aldrich (South Africa) Danie Visser
- Score: 7–6^{(7–5)}, 7–6^{(7–4)}, 7–6^{(7–5)}

Details
- Draw: 64 (5 Q / 5 WC )
- Seeds: 16

Events
Singles	men	women		boys	girls
Doubles	men	women	mixed	boys	girls
WC Singles	men	women	quad
WC Doubles	men	women	quad
Legends	men	women	seniors
← 1989 ·	Wimbledon Championships	· 1991 →

John Fitzgerald and Anders Järryd were the defending champions but lost in the first round to Jonathan Canter and Bruce Derlin.

Rick Leach and Jim Pugh defeated Pieter Aldrich and Danie Visser in the final, 7–6^{(7–5)}, 7–6^{(7–4)}, 7–6^{(7–5)} to win the gentlemen's doubles title at the 1990 Wimbledon Championships.

== Seeds ==
1. (United States) Rick Leach / (United States) Jim Pugh (champions)
2. (South Africa) Pieter Aldrich / (South Africa) Danie Visser (final)
3. (Australia) John Fitzgerald / (Sweden) Anders Järryd (first round)
4. (United States) Scott Davis / (United States) David Pate (second round)
5. (Czechoslovakia) Petr Korda / (Czechoslovakia) Tomáš Šmíd (second round)
6. (Canada) Grant Connell / (Canada) Glenn Michibata (quarterfinals)
7. (France) Guy Forget / (Switzerland) Jakob Hlasek (third round)
8. (United States) Ken Flach / (United States) Robert Seguso (quarterfinals)
9. (Australia) Darren Cahill / (Australia) Mark Kratzmann (first round)
10. (United States) Jim Grabb / (United States) Patrick McEnroe (third round)
11. (United Kingdom) Neil Broad / (South Africa) Gary Muller (second round)
12. (West Germany) Udo Riglewski / (West Germany) Michael Stich (second round)
13. (Argentina) Gustavo Luza / (Brazil) Cássio Motta (second round)
14. (United Kingdom) Jeremy Bates / (United States) Kevin Curren (quarterfinals)
15. (United States) Glenn Layendecker / (United States) Richey Reneberg (first round)
16. (United States) Patrick Galbraith / (Australia) David Macpherson (second round)

Click on the seed number of a player to go to their draw section.

== Draw ==
=== Key ===
- Q = Qualifier
- WC = Wild card
- LL = Lucky loser
- Alt = Alternate
- ITF = ITF entry
- PR = Protected ranking
- SR = Special ranking
- SE = Special exempt
- JE = Junior exempt
- JR = Junior Accelerator Programme entrant
- CO = College Accelerator Programme entrant
- NG = Next Gen Accelerator Program entrant
- w/o = Walkover
- r = Retired
- d = Defaulted

=== Finals ===
Quarterfinals
1	(United States) Rick Leach (United States) Jim Pugh	7	7	7
(Australia) Jason Stoltenberg (Australia) Todd Woodbridge	6	6	6
(South Africa) Stefan Kruger (United States) Greg Van Emburgh	7	6	6	4	6
6	(Canada) Grant Connell (Canada) Glenn Michibata	6	7	2	6	4
(Argentina) Javier Frana (Mexico) Leonardo Lavalle	6	2	7	6
14	(United Kingdom) Jeremy Bates (United States) Kevin Curren	3	6	5	1
8	(United States) Ken Flach (United States) Robert Seguso	7	6	6	6	3
2	(South Africa) Pieter Aldrich (South Africa) Danie Visser	6	7	4	7	6

Semifinals
1	(United States) Rick Leach (United States) Jim Pugh	4	6	7	6
(South Africa) Stefan Kruger (United States) Greg Van Emburgh	6	4	6	3
(Argentina) Javier Frana (Mexico) Leonardo Lavalle	4	3	2
2	(South Africa) Pieter Aldrich (South Africa) Danie Visser	6	6	6

Final
1	(United States) Rick Leach (United States) Jim Pugh	7^{7}	7^{7}	7^{7}
2	(South Africa) Pieter Aldrich (South Africa) Danie Visser	6^{5}	6^{4}	6^{5}

=== Top half ===
==== Section 1 ====
First round
1	(United States) R Leach (United States) J Pugh	6	6	7
(United States) T Nelson (The Bahamas) R Smith	4	4	6
LL	(Sweden) R Bergh (Sweden) H Holm	1	6	3
(France) J-P Fleurian (Italy) D Nargiso	6	7	6
(Argentina) P Albano (Sweden) D Engel	5	7	6	6	4
(Denmark) M Mortensen (Netherlands) T Nijssen	7	6	3	7	6
Q	(South Africa) W Ferreira (South Africa) P Norval	6	6	6
15	(United States) G Layendecker (United States) R Reneberg	4	3	4
9	(Australia) D Cahill (Australia) M Kratzmann	6	6	6	4
(Australia) J Stoltenberg (Australia) T Woodbridge	7	7	4	6
(United States) T Pawsat (United States) D Wheaton	6	6	6
WC	(United Kingdom) C Bailey (United Kingdom) D Ison	2	2	4
(Iran) M Bahrami (France) É Winogradsky	6	6	2	4
WC	(United Kingdom) M Petchey (United Kingdom) D Sapsford	3	7	6	6
(Czechoslovakia) K Nováček (Czechoslovakia) L Pimek	3	7	4	0
7	(France) G Forget (Switzerland) J Hlasek	6	6	6	6

Second round
1	(United States) R Leach (United States) J Pugh	6	3	7	7
(France) J-P Fleurian (Italy) D Nargiso	4	6	5	6
(Denmark) M Mortensen (Netherlands) T Nijssen	4	7	6	6	7
Q	(South Africa) W Ferreira (South Africa) P Norval	6	6	4	7	9
(Australia) J Stoltenberg (Australia) T Woodbridge	6	6	7
(United States) T Pawsat (United States) D Wheaton	4	1	6
WC	(United Kingdom) M Petchey (United Kingdom) D Sapsford	3	4	4
7	(France) G Forget (Switzerland) J Hlasek	6	6	6

Third round
1	(United States) R Leach (United States) J Pugh	3	6	6	7
Q	(South Africa) W Ferreira (South Africa) P Norval	6	1	4	5
(Australia) J Stoltenberg (Australia) T Woodbridge	6	6	7
7	(France) G Forget (Switzerland) J Hlasek	4	3	6

Quarterfinals
1	(United States) R Leach (United States) J Pugh	7	7	7
(Australia) J Stoltenberg (Australia) T Woodbridge	6	6	6

==== Section 2 ====
First round
4	(United States) S Davis (United States) D Pate	7	6	6
(United States) P Annacone (South Africa) C van Rensburg	6	4	4
Q	(United Kingdom) P Hand (United Kingdom) C Wilkinson	6	4	4
(South Africa) S Kruger (United States) G Van Emburgh	7	6	6
WC	(United Kingdom) S Botfield (United Kingdom) J Turner	6	4	6	5	8
(United States) P Chamberlin (United States) T Wilkison	2	6	4	7	6
(Socialist Federal Republic of Yugoslavia) G Ivanišević (Hungary) B Taróczy	5	5	0^{r}
13	(Argentina) G Luza (Brazil) C Motta	7	7	1
12	(West Germany) U Riglewski (West Germany) M Stich	6	6	6	7	6
LL	(South Africa) R Deppe (South Africa) B Talbot	1	7	7	5	2
(Australia) B Drewett (Australia) W Masur	7	6	6
(Austria) A Antonitsch (United Kingdom) A Castle	6	4	4
WC	(United Kingdom) J Goodall (United Kingdom) U Nganga	4	6	3
(New Zealand) K Evernden (Venezuela) N Pereira	6	7	6
(Netherlands) P Haarhuis (Netherlands) M Koevermans	3	7	4	6
6	(Canada) G Connell (Canada) G Michibata	6	5	6	7

Second round
4	(United States) S Davis (United States) D Pate	6	3	4
(South Africa) S Kruger (United States) G Van Emburgh	7	6	6
WC	(United Kingdom) S Botfield (United Kingdom) J Turner	7	7	4	6	8
13	(Argentina) G Luza (Brazil) C Motta	6	5	6	7	6
12	(West Germany) U Riglewski (West Germany) M Stich	2	2	7	6
(Australia) B Drewett (Australia) W Masur	6	6	6	7
(New Zealand) K Evernden (Venezuela) N Pereira	6	5	7	6	8
6	(Canada) G Connell (Canada) G Michibata	7	7	6	4	10

Third round
(South Africa) S Kruger (United States) G Van Emburgh	6	6	6
WC	(United Kingdom) S Botfield (United Kingdom) J Turner	4	3	2
(Australia) B Drewett (Australia) W Masur	6	3	6	6
6	(Canada) G Connell (Canada) G Michibata	3	6	7	7

Quarterfinals
(South Africa) S Kruger (United States) G Van Emburgh	7	6	6	4	6
6	(Canada) G Connell (Canada) G Michibata	6	7	2	6	4

=== Bottom half ===
==== Section 3 ====
First round
5	(Czechoslovakia) P Korda (Czechoslovakia) T Šmíd	7	6	6
(Brazil) N Aerts (Brazil) F Roese	6	4	2
(United States) B Garrow (United States) S Salumaa	4	7	5	4
(United States) S Cannon (United States) B Garnett	6	5	7	6
(Argentina) J Frana (Mexico) L Lavalle	3	6	6	7	6
(Brazil) L Mattar (Argentina) C Miniussi	6	7	4	6	1
(Venezuela) A Mora (United States) B Page	6	6	7	6	7
11	(United Kingdom) N Broad (South Africa) G Muller	7	7	5	4	9
14	(United Kingdom) J Bates (United States) K Curren	6	6	6
(Czechoslovakia) D Rikl (Czechoslovakia) T Zdražila	4	2	2
(Australia) P Doohan (Australia) L Warder	6	3	6	6	6
(Italy) S Colombo (Italy) G Pozzi	3	6	3	7	4
(United States) C Beckman (United States) L Jensen	6	3	6	3
(United States) S DeVries (United States) J Rive	3	6	7	6
(United States) J Canter (New Zealand) B Derlin	1	6	6	1
3	(Australia) J Fitzgerald (Sweden) A Järryd	6	1	4	0^{r}

Second round
5	(Czechoslovakia) P Korda (Czechoslovakia) T Šmíd	6	6	6	6	13
(United States) S Cannon (United States) B Garnett	3	7	7	4	15
(Argentina) J Frana (Mexico) L Lavalle	6	5	6	3	8
11	(United Kingdom) N Broad (South Africa) G Muller	4	7	2	6	6
14	(United Kingdom) J Bates (United States) K Curren	7	6	3	6	6
(Australia) P Doohan (Australia) L Warder	6	3	6	7	4
(United States) S DeVries (United States) J Rive	6	6	3	4
(United States) J Canter (New Zealand) B Derlin	7	3	6	6

Third round
(United States) S Cannon (United States) B Garnett	3	3	3
(Argentina) J Frana (Mexico) L Lavalle	6	6	6
14	(United Kingdom) J Bates (United States) K Curren	6	6	6
(United States) J Canter (New Zealand) B Derlin	2	1	4

Quarterfinals
(Argentina) J Frana (Mexico) L Lavalle	6	2	7	6
14	(United Kingdom) J Bates (United States) K Curren	3	6	5	1

==== Section 4 ====
First round
8	(United States) K Flach (United States) R Seguso	6	6	6
(Sweden) R Båthman (Sweden) J Gunnarsson	4	1	3
(United States) K Kinnear (United States) B Pearce	7	6	6	6
(Nigeria) N Odizor (Kenya) P Wekesa	6	3	7	3
Q	(West Germany) P Baur (West Germany) C Saceanu	7	6	6	3	6
WC	(United Kingdom) N Fulwood (Sweden) P Lundgren	5	4	7	6	8
Q	(France) A Boetsch (France) G Raoux	7	6	6	4
10	(United States) J Grabb (United States) P McEnroe	5	7	7	6
16	(United States) P Galbraith (Australia) D Macpherson	6	6	7
(Australia) B Dyke (Australia) S Youl	0	4	5
(United Kingdom) N Brown (Netherlands) M Schapers	3	6	6	7
Q	(Australia) G Pfitzner (West Germany) T Theine	6	4	1	6
(United States) J Courier (United States) M Davis	4	6	7	6	6
(Czechoslovakia) J Čihák (Czechoslovakia) C Suk	6	7	6	3	3
(United States) K Jones (United States) R Van't Hof	6	3	4
2	(South Africa) P Aldrich (South Africa) D Visser	7	6	6

Second round
8	(United States) K Flach (United States) R Seguso	6	7	6
(United States) K Kinnear (United States) B Pearce	2	6	3
WC	(United Kingdom) N Fulwood (Sweden) P Lundgren	6	1	7	3	3
10	(United States) J Grabb (United States) P McEnroe	3	6	6	6	6
16	(United States) P Galbraith (Australia) D Macpherson	6	5	2	3
(United Kingdom) N Brown (Netherlands) M Schapers	4	7	6	6
(United States) J Courier (United States) M Davis	6	4	5
2	(South Africa) P Aldrich (South Africa) D Visser	7	6	7

Third round
8	(United States) K Flach (United States) R Seguso	1	6	7	7
10	(United States) J Grabb (United States) P McEnroe	6	4	5	6
(United Kingdom) N Brown (Netherlands) M Schapers	6	3	6
2	(South Africa) P Aldrich (South Africa) D Visser	7	6	7

Quarterfinals
8	(United States) K Flach (United States) R Seguso	7	6	6	6	3
2	(South Africa) P Aldrich (South Africa) D Visser	6	7	4	7	6
