= 1990 Wimbledon Championships =

- Date: 25 June – 8 July
- Edition: 104th
- Category: Grand Slam
- Draw: 128S/64D/64XD
- Prize money: £3,819,730
- Surface: Grass
- Location: Church Road; SW19, Wimbledon, London, United Kingdom
- Venue: All England Lawn Tennis and Croquet Club

Champions

Men's singles
- (Sweden) Stefan Edberg

Women's singles
- (United States) Martina Navratilova

Men's doubles
- (United States) Rick Leach / (United States) Jim Pugh

Women's doubles
- (Czechoslovakia) Jana Novotná / (Czechoslovakia) Helena Suková

Mixed doubles
- (United States) Rick Leach / (United States) Zina Garrison

Boys' singles
- (India) Leander Paes

Girls' singles
- (Czechoslovakia) Andrea Strnadová

Boys' doubles
- (Canada) Sébastien Lareau / (Canada) Sébastien Leblanc

Girls' doubles
- (Czechoslovakia) Karina Habšudová / (Czechoslovakia) Andrea Strnadová

Gentlemen's invitation doubles
- Singles: (United States) Tom Gullikson; Doubles: (Australia) Peter McNamara / (Australia) Paul McNamee

Ladies' invitation doubles
- (Australia) Wendy Turnbull / (United Kingdom) Virginia Wade
- Wimbledon Championships

The 1990 Wimbledon Championships was a tennis tournament played on grass courts at the All England Lawn Tennis and Croquet Club in Wimbledon, London in the United Kingdom. It was the 104th edition of the Wimbledon Championships and were held from 25 June to 8 July 1990.

== Prize money ==
The total prize money for 1990 championships was £3,819,730. The winner of the men's title earned £230,000 while the women's singles champion earned £207,000.

Event	W	F	SF	QF	Round of 16	Round of 32	Round of 64	Round of 128
Men's singles	£230,000	£115,000	£57,550	£29,990	£16,100	£9,310	£5,635	£3,450
Women's singles	£207,000	£103,500	£50,315	£25,415	£12,880	£7,215	£4,370	£2,675
Men's doubles *	£94,230							—N/a
Women's doubles *	£81,510							—N/a
Mixed doubles *	£40,000							—N/a

_{* per team}

== Champions ==
=== Seniors ===
==== Men's singles ====
(Sweden) Stefan Edberg defeated (West Germany) Boris Becker, 6–2, 6–2, 3–6, 3–6, 6–4

- It was Edberg's 4th career Grand Slam title and his 2nd and last Wimbledon title.

==== Women's singles ====
(United States) Martina Navratilova defeated (United States) Zina Garrison, 6–4, 6–1

- It was Navratilova's 54th career Grand Slam title and her 9th Wimbledon title. It was also Navratilova's last Grand Slam Singles title.

==== Men's doubles ====
(United States) Rick Leach / (United States) Jim Pugh defeated (South Africa) Pieter Aldrich / (South Africa) Danie Visser, 7–6^{(7–5)}, 7–6^{(7–4)}, 7–6^{(7–5)}

- It was Leach's 3rd career Grand Slam title and his 1st Wimbledon title. It was Pugh's 7th career Grand Slam title and his 2nd and last Wimbledon title.

==== Women's doubles ====
(Czechoslovakia) Jana Novotná / (Czechoslovakia) Helena Suková defeated (United States) Kathy Jordan / (Australia) Elizabeth Smylie, 6–4, 6–1

- It was Novotná's 8th career Grand Slam title and her 3rd Wimbledon title. It was Suková's 6th career Grand Slam title and her 3rd Wimbledon title.

==== Mixed doubles ====
(United States) Rick Leach / (United States) Zina Garrison defeated (Australia) John Fitzgerald / (Australia) Elizabeth Smylie, 7–5, 6–2

- It was Leach's 4th career Grand Slam title and his 2nd and last Wimbledon title. It was Garrison's 3rd Grand Slam title and her 2nd Wimbledon title.

=== Juniors ===
==== Boys' singles ====
(India) Leander Paes defeated (South Africa) Marcos Ondruska, 7–5, 2–6, 6–4

==== Girls' singles ====
(Czechoslovakia) Andrea Strnadová defeated (Australia) Kirrily Sharpe, 6–2, 6–4

==== Boys' doubles ====
(Canada) Sébastien Lareau / (Canada) Sébastien Leblanc defeated (South Africa) Clinton Marsh / (South Africa) Marcos Ondruska, 7–6^{(7–5)}, 4–6, 6–3

==== Girls' doubles ====
(Czechoslovakia) Karina Habšudová / (Czechoslovakia) Andrea Strnadová defeated (Australia) Nicole Pratt / (Australia) Kirrily Sharpe, 6–3, 6–2

=== Invitation ===
==== Gentlemen's invitation singles ====
(United States) Tom Gullikson defeated (United States) Tim Gullikson, 4–6, 6–2, 7–6

==== Gentlemen's invitation doubles ====
(Australia) Peter McNamara / (Australia) Paul McNamee defeated (United States) Tim Gullikson / (United States) Tom Gullikson, 6–7, 7–6, 13–11

==== Ladies' invitation doubles ====
(Australia) Wendy Turnbull / (United Kingdom) Virginia Wade defeated (United States) Rosemary Casals / (United States) Sharon Walsh-Pete, 6–2, 6–4

== Singles seeds ==
=== Men's singles ===
1. (Czechoslovakia) Ivan Lendl (semifinals, lost to Stefan Edberg)
2. (West Germany) Boris Becker (final, lost to Stefan Edberg)
3. (Sweden) Stefan Edberg (champion)
4. (United States) John McEnroe (first round, lost to Derrick Rostagno)
5. (Ecuador) Andrés Gómez (first round, lost to Jim Grabb)
6. (United States) Tim Mayotte (first round, lost to Gary Muller)
7. (United States) Brad Gilbert (quarterfinals, lost to Boris Becker)
8. (United States) Aaron Krickstein (withdrew before the tournament began)
9. (United States) Jim Courier (third round, lost to Mark Woodforde)
10. (Sweden) Jonas Svensson (third round, lost to David Wheaton)
11. (France) Guy Forget (fourth round, lost to Christian Bergström)
12. (United States) Pete Sampras (first round, lost to Christo van Rensburg)
13. (United States) Michael Chang (fourth round, lost to Stefan Edberg)
14. (Czechoslovakia) Petr Korda (first round, lost to Gilad Bloom)
15. (France) Henri Leconte (second round, lost to Alex Antonitsch)
16. (France) Yannick Noah (first round, lost to Wayne Ferreira)

=== Women's singles ===
1. (West Germany) Steffi Graf (semifinals, lost to Zina Garrison)
2. (United States) Martina Navratilova (champion)
3. (Socialist Federal Republic of Yugoslavia) Monica Seles (quarterfinals, lost to Zina Garrison)
4. (Argentina) Gabriela Sabatini (semifinals, lost to Martina Navratilova)
5. (United States) Zina Garrison (final, lost to Martina Navratilova)
6. (Spain) Arantxa Sánchez Vicario (first round, lost to Betsy Nagelsen)
7. (Bulgaria) Katerina Maleeva (quarterfinals, lost to Martina Navratilova)
8. (Switzerland) Manuela Maleeva-Fragnière (first round, lost to Sara Gomer)
9. (United States) Mary Joe Fernández (withdrew before the tournament began)
10. (Czechoslovakia) Helena Suková (fourth round, lost to Zina Garrison)
11. (Soviet Union) Natasha Zvereva (quarterfinals, lost to Gabriela Sabatini)
12. (United States) Jennifer Capriati (fourth round, lost to Steffi Graf)
13. (Czechoslovakia) Jana Novotná (quarterfinals, lost to Steffi Graf)
14. (Austria) Judith Wiesner (fourth round, lost to Martina Navratilova)
15. (South Africa) Rosalyn Fairbank (second round, lost to Amy Frazier)
16. (Austria) Barbara Paulus (first round, lost to Sarah Loosemore)

Preceded by 1990 French Open	Grand Slams	Succeeded by 1990 US Open
