= 1990 US Open (tennis) =

- Date: August 27 – September 9
- Edition: 110th
- Category: Grand Slam (ITF)
- Surface: Hardcourt
- Location: New York City, New York, United States

Champions

Men's singles
- (United States) Pete Sampras

Women's singles
- (Argentina) Gabriela Sabatini

Men's doubles
- (South Africa) Pieter Aldrich / (South Africa) Danie Visser

Women's doubles
- (United States) Gigi Fernández / (United States) Martina Navratilova

Mixed doubles
- (Australia) Elizabeth Smylie / (Australia) Todd Woodbridge

Boys' singles
- (Italy) Andrea Gaudenzi

Girls' singles
- (Bulgaria) Magdalena Maleeva

Boys' doubles
- (Canada) Sébastien Leblanc / (Canada) Greg Rusedski

Girls' doubles
- (Australia) Kristin Godridge / (Australia) Kirrily Sharpe
- US Open

The 1990 US Open was a tennis tournament played on outdoor hard courts at the USTA National Tennis Center in New York City in the United States. It was the 110th edition of the US Open and was held from August 27 to September 9, 1990.

== Seniors ==
=== Men's singles ===
(United States) Pete Sampras defeated (United States) Andre Agassi 6–4, 6–3, 6–2

- It was Pete Sampras' 1st career Grand Slam title and his 1st US Open title. He became the youngest US Open men's singles champion at 19 years, 28 days.

=== Women's singles ===
(Argentina) Gabriela Sabatini defeated (West Germany) Steffi Graf 6–2, 7–6^{(7–4)}

- It was Sabatini's only Grand Slam title. She became the first female tennis player from Argentina to win a Grand Slam singles title.

=== Men's doubles ===
(South Africa) Pieter Aldrich / (South Africa) Danie Visser defeated (United States) Paul Annacone / (United States) David Wheaton 6–2, 7–6 (7–3), 6–2

- It was Pieter Aldrich's 2nd and last career Grand Slam title and his only US Open title. It was Danie Visser's 2nd career Grand Slam title and his only US Open title.

=== Women's doubles ===
(United States) Gigi Fernández / (United States) Martina Navratilova defeated (Czechoslovakia) Jana Novotná / (Czechoslovakia) Helena Suková 6–2, 6–4

- It was Gigi Fernández's 2nd career Grand Slam title and her 2nd US Open title. It was Martina Navratilova's 55th career Grand Slam title and her 15th US Open title.

=== Mixed doubles ===
(Australia) Elizabeth Smylie / (Australia) Todd Woodbridge defeated (Soviet Union) Natasha Zvereva / (United States) Jim Pugh 6–4, 6–2

- It was Elizabeth Smylie's 3rd career Grand Slam title and her 2nd and last US Open title. It was Todd Woodbridge's 1st career Grand Slam title and his 1st US Open title.

== Juniors ==
=== Boys' singles ===
(Italy) Andrea Gaudenzi defeated (Sweden) Mikael Tillström 6–2, 4–6, 7–6

=== Girls' singles ===
(Bulgaria) Magdalena Maleeva defeated (France) Noëlle van Lottum 7–5, 6–2

=== Boys' doubles ===
(Canada) Sébastien Leblanc / (Canada) Greg Rusedski defeated (Sweden) Marten Renström / (Sweden) Mikael Tillström 6–7, 6–3, 6–4

=== Girls' doubles ===
(Australia) Kristin Godridge / (Australia) Kirrily Sharpe defeated (United States) Erika deLone / (United States) Lisa Raymond 4–6, 7–5, 6–2

== Other events ==
=== Gentlemen's invitation singles ===
(United States) Sandy Mayer defeated (United States) Tom Gullikson 6–4, 6–4

=== Gentlemen's invitation doubles ===
(United States) Tom Gullikson / (United States) Dick Stockton defeated (Australia) Mark Edmondson / (United States) Sherwood Stewart 6–7, 7–6, 6–4

=== Ladies' invitation doubles ===
(United States) Rosemary Casals / (United States) Billie Jean King defeated (Australia) Wendy Turnbull / (United Kingdom) Virginia Wade 2–6, 6–4, 6–3

== Prize money ==
Event		W	F	SF	QF	4R	3R	2R	1R
Singles	Men	$350,000	$175,000	$87,000	$45,378	$24,590	$14,166	$8,697	$5,195
Singles	Women	$350,000	$175,000	$87,000	$45,378	$24,590	$14,166	$8,697	$5,195

Total prize money for the event was $6,349,250.

Preceded by 1990 Wimbledon Championships	Grand Slams	Succeeded by 1991 Australian Open
