= 1990 Wimbledon Championships – Men's singles =

Men's singles
- 1990 Wimbledon Championships

Final
- Champion: (Sweden) Stefan Edberg
- Runner-up: (West Germany) Boris Becker
- Score: 6–2, 6–2, 3–6, 3–6, 6–4

Details
- Draw: 128 (16 Q / 8 WC )
- Seeds: 16

Events
Singles	men	women		boys	girls
Doubles	men	women	mixed	boys	girls
WC Singles	men	women	quad
WC Doubles	men	women	quad
Legends	men	women	seniors
← 1989 ·	Wimbledon Championships	· 1991 →

Stefan Edberg defeated defending champion Boris Becker in a rematch of the previous two years' finals, 6–2, 6–2, 3–6, 3–6, 6–4 to win the gentlemen's singles tennis title at the 1990 Wimbledon Championships. It was his second Wimbledon singles title and fourth major singles title overall.

== Seeds ==
1. (Czechoslovakia) Ivan Lendl (semifinals)
2. (West Germany) Boris Becker (final)
3. (Sweden) Stefan Edberg (champion)
4. (United States) John McEnroe (first round)
5. (Ecuador) Andrés Gómez (first round)
6. (United States) Tim Mayotte (first round)
7. (United States) Brad Gilbert (quarterfinals)
8. (United States) Aaron Krickstein (withdrew)
9. (United States) Jim Courier (third round)
10. (Sweden) Jonas Svensson (third round)
11. (France) Guy Forget (fourth round)
12. (United States) Pete Sampras (first round)
13. (United States) Michael Chang (fourth round)
14. (Czechoslovakia) Petr Korda (first round)
15. (France) Henri Leconte (second round)
16. (France) Yannick Noah (first round)

Click on the seed number of a player to go to their draw section.

Aaron Krickstein withdrew due to injury. He was replaced in the draw by Qualifier Shuzo Matsuoka.

== Draw ==
=== Key ===
- Q = Qualifier
- WC = Wild card
- LL = Lucky loser
- Alt = Alternate
- ITF = ITF entry
- PR = Protected ranking
- SR = Special ranking
- SE = Special exempt
- JE = Junior exempt
- JR = Junior Accelerator Programme entrant
- CO = College Accelerator Programme entrant
- NG = Next Gen Accelerator Program entrant
- w/o = Walkover
- r = Retired
- d = Defaulted

=== Finals ===
Quarterfinals
1	(Czechoslovakia) Ivan Lendl	6	6	5	6
(United States) Brad Pearce	4	4	7	4
3	(Sweden) Stefan Edberg	6	6	6
(Sweden) Christian Bergström	3	2	4
(United States) Kevin Curren	6	4	4	7^{10}	3
(Socialist Federal Republic of Yugoslavia) Goran Ivanišević	4	6	6	6^{8}	6
7	(United States) Brad Gilbert	4	4	1
2	(West Germany) Boris Becker	6	6	6

Semifinals
1	(Czechoslovakia) Ivan Lendl	1	6^{2}	3
3	(Sweden) Stefan Edberg	6	7^{7}	6
(Socialist Federal Republic of Yugoslavia) Goran Ivanišević	6	6^{4}	0	6^{5}
2	(West Germany) Boris Becker	4	7^{7}	6	7^{7}

Final
3	(Sweden) Stefan Edberg	6	6	3	3	6
2	(West Germany) Boris Becker	2	2	6	6	4

=== Top half ===
==== Section 1 ====
First round
1	(Czechoslovakia) I Lendl	3	6	6	6
(Argentina) C Miniussi	6	4	3	4
LL	(Spain) C Costa	3	4	1
(Switzerland) J Hlasek	6	6	6
(United States) B Shelton	7^{7}	5	7^{7}	6
(Sweden) T Högstedt	6^{3}	7	6^{2}	4
(Spain) S Bruguera	6^{2}	6	6	6
WC	(United Kingdom) A Castle	7^{7}	4	3	1
(Italy) C Pistolesi	3	4	4
(United States) D Pate	6	6	6
Q	(France) G Raoux	6	6	7
WC	(United Kingdom) J Turner	3	4	5
(Austria) A Antonitsch	7^{7}	6	3	4	6
Q	(South Africa) M Robertson	6^{2}	4	6	6	4
(Australia) S Youl	4	3	3
15	(France) H Leconte	6	6	6

Second round
1	(Czechoslovakia) I Lendl	6	6	6
(Switzerland) J Hlasek	1	3	0
(United States) B Shelton	5	2	6	6	6
(Spain) S Bruguera	7	6	4	4	4
(United States) D Pate	3	6	6	6
Q	(France) G Raoux	6	2	4	3
(Austria) A Antonitsch	2	6	7^{7}	2	6
15	(France) H Leconte	6	4	6^{2}	6	3

Third round
1	(Czechoslovakia) I Lendl	7^{7}	6^{4}	6	6
(United States) B Shelton	6^{2}	7^{7}	4	4
(United States) D Pate	4	4	6^{5}
(Austria) A Antonitsch	6	6	7^{7}

Fourth round
1	(Czechoslovakia) I Lendl	3	6	6	6
(Austria) A Antonitsch	6	4	3	4

==== Section 2 ====
First round
9	(United States) J Courier	6	6	6
(South Africa) M Kaplan	1	4	4
LL	(Australia) T Woodbridge	3	5	6^{2}
(Australia) J Stoltenberg	6	7	7^{7}
(West Germany) U Riglewski	6	7	7
(Finland) V Paloheimo	4	5	5
(Australia) J Fitzgerald	5	2	4
WC	(Australia) M Woodforde	7	6	6
(United States) B Garrow	4	4	4
(West Germany) J Wöhrmann	6	6	6
(Czechoslovakia) M Šrejber	6^{6}	3	7^{7}	6	6
(United States) R Reneberg	7^{8}	6	6^{4}	3	2
(United States) B Pearce	6	3	6	6
Q	(Sweden) R Båthman	3	6	2	3
(Brazil) L Mattar	6^{5}	3	4
Q	(Japan) S Matsuoka	7^{7}	6	6

Second round
9	(United States) J Courier	6	7^{7}	6
(Australia) J Stoltenberg	2	6^{3}	4
(West Germany) U Riglewski	7^{8}	4	4	5
WC	(Australia) M Woodforde	6^{6}	6	6	7
(West Germany) J Wöhrmann	2	7^{9}	3	2
(Czechoslovakia) M Šrejber	6	6^{7}	6	6
(United States) B Pearce	7^{7}	7	6
Q	(Japan) S Matsuoka	6^{1}	5	3

Third round
9	(United States) J Courier	5	7	5	4
WC	(Australia) M Woodforde	7	5	7	6
(Czechoslovakia) M Šrejber	3	3	1
(United States) B Pearce	6	6	6

Fourth round
WC	(Australia) M Woodforde	4	4	4
(United States) B Pearce	6	6	6

==== Section 3 ====
First round
3	(Sweden) S Edberg	4	6	6	6
LL	(Australia) B Dyke	6	1	3	1
(Czechoslovakia) M Mečíř	6	6	6
(Spain) T Carbonell	4	4	1
(France) J-P Fleurian	6^{4}	7	6	1	4
(Australia) R Fromberg	7^{7}	5	4	6	6
(Israel) A Mansdorf	6	1	5	6	6
Q	(Sweden) H Holm	1	6	7	3	2
(Australia) M Kratzmann	6	6	6
(Brazil) C Motta	2	1	3
Q	(United States) R Leach	3	6	5	5
(Sweden) A Järryd	6	3	7	7
(Sweden) J Gunnarsson	3	6	7	3	4
(United States) J Pugh	6	1	5	6	6
(Spain) JF Altur	7	4	3	5
13	(United States) M Chang	5	6	6	7

Second round
3	(Sweden) S Edberg	6	6	6
(Czechoslovakia) M Mečíř	2	3	2
(Australia) R Fromberg	4	6^{4}	1
(Israel) A Mansdorf	6	7^{7}	6
(Australia) M Kratzmann
(Sweden) A Järryd	w/o
(United States) J Pugh	3	2	2
13	(United States) M Chang	6	6	6

Third round
3	(Sweden) S Edberg	6	5	3	6	9
(Israel) A Mansdorf	4	7	6	2	7
(Australia) M Kratzmann	6	6	4	2	3
13	(United States) M Chang	3	4	6	6	6

Fourth round
3	(Sweden) S Edberg	6	6	6
13	(United States) M Chang	3	2	1

==== Section 4 ====
First round
11	(France) G Forget	6	6	6
(Sweden) L-A Wahlgren	2	1	4
(West Germany) P Kühnen	3	3	1
(West Germany) E Jelen	6	6	6
(Finland) A Rahunen	3	4	6	7^{7}	6
(New Zealand) K Evernden	6	6	1	6^{0}	3
(West Germany) M Stich	6	6	6
Q	(West Germany) D Dier	2	3	2
Q	(United Kingdom) N Broad	6	6	7^{8}
(United States) L Duncan	4	2	6^{6}
(Sweden) C Bergström	6	6	6
(United States) T Wilkison	4	3	4
WC	(United Kingdom) M Petchey	6	0	6^{6}	3
(United States) P Chamberlin	3	6	7^{8}	6
(United States) J Grabb	6	6	6
5	(Ecuador) A Gómez	4	2	2

Second round
11	(France) G Forget	7^{7}	6^{5}	6	6
(West Germany) E Jelen	6^{4}	7^{7}	1	2
(Finland) A Rahunen	2	5	3
(West Germany) M Stich	6	7	6
Q	(United Kingdom) N Broad	6	6^{1}	2	2
(Sweden) C Bergström	4	7^{7}	6	6
(United States) P Chamberlin	2	7^{9}	6^{6}	6	3
(United States) J Grabb	6	6^{7}	7^{8}	3	6

Third round
11	(France) G Forget	3	7	6	4	6
(West Germany) M Stich	6	5	2	6	3
(Sweden) C Bergström	7^{7}	6	6
(United States) J Grabb	6^{5}	4	2

Fourth round
11	(France) G Forget	4	6	3	5
(Sweden) C Bergström	6	3	6	7

=== Bottom half ===
==== Section 5 ====
First round
6	(United States) T Mayotte	6	6^{1}	5	3
(South Africa) G Muller	4	7^{7}	7	6
(United States) K Curren	6	6	6
(United States) J Tarango	1	4	1
(Czechoslovakia) K Nováček	6	6^{3}	0	6	6
(United States) G Layendecker	4	7^{7}	6	4	0
(United States) J Rive	5	6	6	5	6
Q	(India) V Amritraj	7	4	4	7	4
(United States) K Jones	6	3	6	6
WC	(United Kingdom) D Sapsford	3	6	4	4
(United States) S Davis	6^{2}	5	3
(Switzerland) M Rosset	7^{7}	7	6
(Socialist Federal Republic of Yugoslavia) S Živojinović	7^{7}	6^{6}	6^{2}	1
(Soviet Union) A Volkov	6^{2}	7^{8}	7^{7}	6
(South Africa) C van Rensburg	7^{7}	7	7^{7}
12	(United States) P Sampras	6^{4}	5	6^{3}

Second round
(South Africa) G Muller	7^{7}	4	6^{4}	7^{7}	4
(United States) K Curren	6^{1}	6	7^{7}	6^{3}	6
(Czechoslovakia) K Nováček	6	6	7^{7}
(United States) J Rive	1	4	6^{2}
(United States) K Jones	6	7^{7}	3	5	3
(Switzerland) M Rosset	3	6^{5}	6	7	6
(Soviet Union) A Volkov	7	6	7^{8}
(South Africa) C van Rensburg	5	4	6^{6}

Third round
(United States) K Curren	6	4	1	7	6
(Czechoslovakia) K Nováček	2	6	6	5	3
(Switzerland) M Rosset	3	4	5
(Soviet Union) A Volkov	6	6	7

Fourth round
(United States) K Curren	6	7^{7}	7^{7}
(Soviet Union) A Volkov	4	6^{3}	6^{5}

==== Section 6 ====
First round
14	(Czechoslovakia) P Korda	0	4	6	2
(Israel) G Bloom	6	6	4	6
WC	(United Kingdom) C Bailey	4	4	2
(Netherlands) M Koevermans	6	6	6
(France) T Benhabiles	3	2	7	6	3
(Sweden) N Kroon	6	6	5	3	6
(Uruguay) D Pérez	4	2	4
(India) R Krishnan	6	6	6
(France) O Delaître	7	6	3	6
(West Germany) M Zoecke	5	4	6	2
Q	(West Germany) A Lesch	4	0	4
(Socialist Federal Republic of Yugoslavia) G Ivanišević	6	6	6
(Sweden) P Lundgren	7^{7}	7^{8}	4	4	0
(United Kingdom) J Bates	6^{5}	6^{6}	6	6	6
(United States) D Rostagno	7	6	6
4	(United States) J McEnroe	5	4	4

Second round
(Israel) G Bloom	5	4	3
(Netherlands) M Koevermans	7	6	6
(Sweden) N Kroon	6	2	6	6
(India) R Krishnan	3	6	3	3
(France) O Delaître	2	0	6	7^{5}	3
(Socialist Federal Republic of Yugoslavia) G Ivanišević	6	6	4	6^{7}	6
(United Kingdom) J Bates	1	6	4	1
(United States) D Rostagno	6	3	6	6

Third round
(Netherlands) M Koevermans	6^{5}	6	6^{2}	6	6
(Sweden) N Kroon	7^{7}	4	7^{7}	4	3
(Socialist Federal Republic of Yugoslavia) G Ivanišević	6	6	6
(United States) D Rostagno	2	2	4

Fourth round
(Netherlands) M Koevermans	6	3	4	6^{2}
(Socialist Federal Republic of Yugoslavia) G Ivanišević	4	6	6	7^{7}

==== Section 7 ====
First round
7	(United States) B Gilbert	6	3	4	6	6
(Socialist Federal Republic of Yugoslavia) B Orešar	1	6	6	1	2
(Canada) G Connell	4	4	4
Q	(South Africa) D Visser	6	6	6
(Australia) D Cahill	6	6	6
(Canada) M Wostenholme	2	2	0
(Netherlands) T Nijssen	6^{2}	3	3
(Netherlands) P Haarhuis	7^{7}	6	6
(Sweden) M Larsson	6^{3}	4	2
(United States) D Wheaton	7^{7}	6	6
(United States) P Annacone	2	3	6	6	8
(United States) L Shiras	6	6	3	3	6
(Sweden) L Jönsson	2	3	1
(United States) M Washington	6	6	6
(France) F Santoro	4	3	2
10	(Sweden) J Svensson	6	6	6

Second round
7	(United States) B Gilbert	5	6	6	6
Q	(South Africa) D Visser	7	3	2	2
(Australia) D Cahill	5	7	6^{7}	6	3
(Netherlands) P Haarhuis	7	5	7^{9}	4	6
(United States) D Wheaton	6	1	6	6^{3}	6
(United States) P Annacone	4	6	4	7^{7}	3
(United States) M Washington	3	3	4
10	(Sweden) J Svensson	6	6	6

Third round
7	(United States) B Gilbert	6	3	6	6
(Netherlands) P Haarhuis	1	6	1	2
(United States) D Wheaton	2	6^{8}	6	6	6
10	(Sweden) J Svensson	6	7^{10}	1	0	4

Fourth round
7	(United States) B Gilbert	6^{8}	3	6	6	13
(United States) D Wheaton	7^{10}	6	1	4	11

==== Section 8 ====
First round
16	(France) Y Noah	4	3	2
Q	(South Africa) W Ferreira	6	6	6
(Czechoslovakia) M Střelba	3	5	3
(Spain) J Aguilera	6	7	6
WC	(Australia) P Cash	4	7^{7}	5	6	6
Q	(Soviet Union) D Poliakov	6	6^{1}	7	4	1
WC	(United Kingdom) N Brown	4	2	6^{12}
(Australia) J Anderson	6	6	7^{14}
(United States) D Goldie	7	6	7
Q	(Netherlands) R Kok	5	1	5
Q	(United States) K Flach	6	7^{7}	6
(Netherlands) M Schapers	4	6^{5}	3
(Australia) W Masur	6	6	6
(Soviet Union) A Cherkasov	3	4	2
Q	(Mexico) L Herrera	6^{2}	6^{4}	5
2	(West Germany) B Becker	7^{7}	7^{7}	7

Second round
Q	(South Africa) W Ferreira	3	6^{2}	5
(Spain) J Aguilera	6	7^{7}	7
WC	(Australia) P Cash	6	6	7^{10}
(Australia) J Anderson	2	3	6^{8}
(United States) D Goldie	6	6	6
Q	(United States) K Flach	3	4	4
(Australia) W Masur	7^{7}	2	3	2
2	(West Germany) B Becker	6^{5}	6	6	6

Third round
(Spain) J Aguilera	1	1	4
WC	(Australia) P Cash	6	6	6
(United States) D Goldie	3	4	6	5
2	(West Germany) B Becker	6	6	4	7

Fourth round
WC	(Australia) P Cash	6^{3}	1	4
2	(West Germany) B Becker	7^{7}	6	6

Preceded by 1990 French Open	Grand Slam; Men's Singles	Succeeded by 1990 US Open
