= 1990 French Open =

- Date: 28 May – 10 June 1990
- Edition: 89
- Category: 60th Grand Slam (ITF)
- Surface: Clay
- Location: Paris (XVI^{e}), France
- Venue: Stade Roland Garros

Champions

Men's singles
- (Ecuador) Andrés Gómez

Women's singles
- (Socialist Federal Republic of Yugoslavia) Monica Seles

Men's doubles
- (Spain) Sergio Casal / (Spain) Emilio Sánchez Vicario

Women's doubles
- (Czechoslovakia) Jana Novotná / (Czechoslovakia) Helena Suková

Mixed doubles
- (Spain) Arantxa Sánchez Vicario / (Mexico) Jorge Lozano
← 1989 ·	French Open	· 1991 →

The 1990 French Open was a tennis tournament that took place on the outdoor clay courts at the Stade Roland Garros in Paris, France. The tournament was held from 28 May until 10 June. It was the 89th staging of the French Open, and the second Grand Slam tennis event of 1990.

== Seniors ==
=== Men's singles ===
(Ecuador) Andrés Gómez defeated (United States) Andre Agassi, 6–3, 2–6, 6–4, 6–4

- It was Gómez's 3rd title of the year, and his 20th overall. It was his 1st (and only) career Grand Slam title.

=== Women's singles ===
(Socialist Federal Republic of Yugoslavia) Monica Seles defeated (West Germany) Steffi Graf, 7–6^{(8–6)}, 6–4

- It was Seles' 6th title of the year, and her 7th overall. It was her 1st career Grand Slam title.

=== Men's doubles ===
(Spain) Sergio Casal / (Spain) Emilio Sánchez Vicario defeated (Socialist Federal Republic of Yugoslavia) Goran Ivanišević / (Czechoslovakia) Petr Korda, 7–5, 6–3

=== Women's doubles ===
(Czechoslovakia) Jana Novotná / (Czechoslovakia) Helena Suková defeated (Soviet Union) Larisa Savchenko / (Soviet Union) Natasha Zvereva, 6–4, 7–5

=== Mixed doubles ===
(Spain) Arantxa Sánchez Vicario / (Mexico) Jorge Lozano defeated (Australia) Nicole Provis / (South Africa) Danie Visser, 7–6^{(7–5)}, 7–6^{(10–8)}

== Juniors ==
=== Boys' singles ===
- (Italy) Andrea Gaudenzi defeated (Sweden) Thomas Enqvist 2–6, 7–6, 6–4

=== Girls' singles ===
- (Bulgaria) Magdalena Maleeva defeated (Soviet Union) Tatiana Ignatieva 6–2, 6–3

=== Boys' doubles ===
- (Canada) Sébastien Leblanc / (Canada) Sébastien Lareau defeated (South Africa) Clinton Marsh / (South Africa) Marcos Ondruska 7–6, 6–7, 9–7

=== Girls' doubles ===
- (Romania) Ruxandra Dragomir / (Romania) Irina Spîrlea defeated (Soviet Union) Tatiana Ignatieva / (Soviet Union) Irina Sukhova 6–3, 6–1

== Prize money ==
Event		W	F	SF	QF	4R	3R	2R	1R
Singles	Men	$370,000	$185,000	$95,500	$48,000	$26,000	$15,000	$9,250	$5,500
Singles	Women	$293,000	$146,500	$73,500	$36,800	$19,300	$10,700	$6,300	$4,000

Total prize money for the event was $5,350,000.

Preceded by 1990 Australian Open	Grand Slams	Succeeded by 1990 Wimbledon Championships
