= 1990 Wimbledon Championships – Women's doubles =

Women's doubles
- 1990 Wimbledon Championships

Final
- Champions: (Czechoslovakia) Jana Novotná (Czechoslovakia) Helena Suková
- Runners-up: (United States) Kathy Jordan (Australia) Elizabeth Smylie
- Score: 6–3, 6–4

Details
- Draw: 64 (4 Q / 4 WC )
- Seeds: 16

Events
Singles	men	women		boys	girls
Doubles	men	women	mixed	boys	girls
WC Singles	men	women	quad
WC Doubles	men	women	quad
Legends	men	women	seniors
← 1989 ·	Wimbledon Championships	· 1991 →

Jana Novotná and Helena Suková successfully defended their title, defeating Kathy Jordan and Elizabeth Smylie in the final, 6–3, 6–4 to win the ladies' doubles tennis title at the 1990 Wimbledon Championships.

== Seeds ==
1. (Czechoslovakia) Jana Novotná / (Czechoslovakia) Helena Suková (champions)
2. (Puerto Rico) Gigi Fernández / (United States) Martina Navratilova (quarterfinals)
3. (Soviet Union) Larisa Savchenko / (Soviet Union) Natasha Zvereva (semifinals)
4. n/a
5. (Australia) Nicole Provis / (South Africa) Elna Reinach (third round)
6. (United States) Kathy Jordan / (Australia) Elizabeth Smylie (final)
7. (Argentina) Mercedes Paz / (Spain) Arantxa Sánchez Vicario (quarterfinals)
8. (West Germany) Steffi Graf / (Argentina) Gabriela Sabatini (quarterfinals)
9. (United States) Katrina Adams / (United States) Lori McNeil (third round)
10. (United States) Patty Fendick / (United States) Zina Garrison (semifinals)
11. (United States) Elise Burgin / (South Africa) Rosalyn Fairbank (third round)
12. (Canada) Jill Hetherington / (United States) Robin White (quarterfinals)
13. (United States) Anne Smith / (Australia) Wendy Turnbull (third round)
14. (Soviet Union) Natalia Medvedeva / (Soviet Union) Leila Meskhi (second round)
15. (United States) Mary-Lou Daniels / (United States) Wendy Prausa (third round)
16. (South Africa) Lise Gregory / (United States) Gretchen Magers (third round)

Click on the seed number of a player to go to their draw section.

== Draw ==
=== Key ===
- Q = Qualifier
- WC = Wild card
- LL = Lucky loser
- Alt = Alternate
- ITF = ITF entry
- PR = Protected ranking
- SR = Special ranking
- SE = Special exempt
- JE = Junior exempt
- JR = Junior Accelerator Programme entrant
- CO = College Accelerator Programme entrant
- NG = Next Gen Accelerator Program entrant
- w/o = Walkover
- r = Retired
- d = Defaulted

=== Finals ===
Quarterfinals
1	(Czechoslovakia) Jana Novotná (Czechoslovakia) Helena Suková	6	6
7	(Argentina) Mercedes Paz (Spain) Arantxa Sánchez Vicario	4	1
10	(United States) Patty Fendick (United States) Zina Garrison	6	6	6
12	(Canada) Jill Hetherington (United States) Robin White	1	7	1
8	(West Germany) Steffi Graf (Argentina) Gabriela Sabatini	4	6	5
3	(Soviet Union) Larisa Savchenko (Soviet Union) Natasha Zvereva	6	1	7
6	(United States) Kathy Jordan (Australia) Elizabeth Smylie	6	2	6
2	(Puerto Rico) Gigi Fernández (United States) Martina Navratilova	3	6	4

Semifinals
1	(Czechoslovakia) Jana Novotná (Czechoslovakia) Helena Suková	7	6
10	(United States) Patty Fendick (United States) Zina Garrison	6	4
3	(Soviet Union) Larisa Savchenko (Soviet Union) Natasha Zvereva	2	6
6	(United States) Kathy Jordan (Australia) Elizabeth Smylie	6	7

Final
1	(Czechoslovakia) Jana Novotná (Czechoslovakia) Helena Suková	6	6
6	(United States) Kathy Jordan (Australia) Elizabeth Smylie	3	4

=== Top half ===
==== Section 1 ====
First round
1	(Czechoslovakia) J Novotná (Czechoslovakia) H Suková	6	6
(Netherlands) C Bakkum (Australia) K Radford	3	2
(United Kingdom) J Durie (New Zealand) J Richardson	7	6
(Sweden) C Lindqvist (Denmark) T Scheuer-Larsen	6	4
WC	(United Kingdom) S Gomer (United Kingdom) J Salmon	0	6	2
Q	(Australia) N Pratt (Australia) K Sharpe	6	3	6
Q	(Australia) K McDonald (Australia) T Morton	4	6	2
13	(United States) A Smith (Australia) W Turnbull	6	3	6
15	(United States) M-L Daniels (United States) W Prausa	7	6
(United States) S Collins (United States) J Smoller	6	3
WC	(United Kingdom) S Loosemore (United Kingdom) A Simpkin	2	1
(West Germany) C Porwik (West Germany) W Probst	6	6
(Sweden) M Lindström (United States) H Ludloff	6	6
(Australia) J-A Faull (Australia) R McQuillan	2	3
Q	(Netherlands) I Driehuis (Netherlands) C Vis	1	3
7	(Argentina) M Paz (Spain) A Sánchez Vicario	6	6

Second round
1	(Czechoslovakia) J Novotná (Czechoslovakia) H Suková	2	6	6
(United Kingdom) J Durie (New Zealand) J Richardson	6	3	0
Q	(Australia) N Pratt (Australia) K Sharpe	3	2
13	(United States) A Smith (Australia) W Turnbull	6	6
15	(United States) M-L Daniels (United States) W Prausa	7	7
(West Germany) C Porwik (West Germany) W Probst	5	5
(Sweden) M Lindström (United States) H Ludloff	4	1
7	(Argentina) M Paz (Spain) A Sánchez Vicario	6	6

Third round
1	(Czechoslovakia) J Novotná (Czechoslovakia) H Suková	7	7
13	(United States) A Smith (Australia) W Turnbull	5	6
15	(United States) M-L Daniels (United States) W Prausa	4	3
7	(Argentina) M Paz (Spain) A Sánchez Vicario	6	6

Quarterfinals
1	(Czechoslovakia) J Novotná (Czechoslovakia) H Suková	6	6
7	(Argentina) M Paz (Spain) A Sánchez Vicario	4	1

==== Section 2 ====
First round
LL	(Belgium) A Devries (Australia) K Godridge	2	6	6
(Canada) H Kelesi (Socialist Federal Republic of Yugoslavia) M Seles	6	3	3
(Switzerland) E Krapl (United States) M Werdel	3	2
(South Africa) L Barnard (Australia) L Field	6	6
WC	(United Kingdom) M Javer (United States) A White	6	6
(United Kingdom) S Smith (Netherlands) H ter Riet	2	3
(West Germany) E Pfaff (Australia) R Stubbs	2	3
10	(United States) P Fendick (United States) Z Garrison	6	6
12	(Canada) J Hetherington (United States) R White	6	6
(United States) N Hu (Australia) M Jaggard	4	3
(Czechoslovakia) P Langrová (Czechoslovakia) J Pospíšilová	7	6
(United States) L Allen (France) S Amiach	5	4
(Australia) J Byrne (Australia) J Thompson	6	1	2
(West Germany) C Kohde-Kilsch (Netherlands) B Schultz	3	6	6
(Soviet Union) E Brioukhovets (Soviet Union) E Maniokova	6	1
5	(Australia) N Provis (South Africa) E Reinach	7	6

Second round
LL	(Belgium) A Devries (Australia) K Godridge	6	2
(South Africa) L Barnard (Australia) L Field	7	6
(United Kingdom) M Javer (United States) A White	3	7	1
10	(United States) P Fendick (United States) Z Garrison	6	5	6
12	(Canada) J Hetherington (United States) R White	6	6
(Czechoslovakia) P Langrová (Czechoslovakia) J Pospíšilová	1	2
(West Germany) C Kohde-Kilsch (Netherlands) B Schultz	6	3
5	(Australia) N Provis (South Africa) E Reinach	7	6

Third round
(South Africa) L Barnard (Australia) L Field	4	0
10	(United States) P Fendick (United States) Z Garrison	6	6
12	(Canada) J Hetherington (United States) R White	6	6
5	(Australia) N Provis (South Africa) E Reinach	4	1

Quarterfinals
10	(United States) P Fendick (United States) Z Garrison	6	6	6
12	(Canada) J Hetherington (United States) R White	1	7	1

=== Bottom half ===
==== Section 3 ====
First round
8	(West Germany) S Graf (Argentina) G Sabatini	2	6	7
(France) I Demongeot (France) C Tanvier	6	3	5
(United States) Ca MacGregor (United States) Cy MacGregor	3	3
(France) A Dechaume (France) N Herreman	6	6
(Japan) M Kidowaki (Australia) A Scott	3	3
(United States) E Herr (United States) T Phelps	6	6
(Denmark) S Albinus (France) N van Lottum	5	4
11	(United States) E Burgin (South Africa) R Fairbank	7	6
9	(United States) K Adams (United States) L McNeil	6	6
(Austria) B Paulus (Czechoslovakia) R Zrubáková	3	3
(United States) J Capriati (United States) M McGrath	6	6
WC	(Canada) C Bassett-Seguso (United States) A Grossman	1	4
(Italy) A-M Cecchini (Peru) L Gildemeister	3	6	2
(United States) A Henricksson (South Africa) D van Rensburg	6	4	6
(Italy) B Romanò (Czechoslovakia) E Švíglerová	0	2
3	(Soviet Union) L Savchenko (Soviet Union) N Zvereva	6	6

Second round
8	(West Germany) S Graf (Argentina) G Sabatini	6	6
(France) A Dechaume (France) N Herreman	0	3
(United States) E Herr (United States) T Phelps	3	4
11	(United States) E Burgin (South Africa) R Fairbank	6	6
9	(United States) K Adams (United States) L McNeil	3	6	11
(United States) J Capriati (United States) M McGrath	6	0	9
(United States) A Henricksson (South Africa) D van Rensburg	1	5
3	(Soviet Union) L Savchenko (Soviet Union) N Zvereva	6	7

Third round
8	(West Germany) S Graf (Argentina) G Sabatini	7	6
11	(United States) E Burgin (South Africa) R Fairbank	6	4
9	(United States) K Adams (United States) L McNeil	3	3
3	(Soviet Union) L Savchenko (Soviet Union) N Zvereva	6	6

Quarterfinals
8	(West Germany) S Graf (Argentina) G Sabatini	4	6	5
3	(Soviet Union) L Savchenko (Soviet Union) N Zvereva	6	1	7

==== Section 4 ====
First round
6	(United States) K Jordan (Australia) E Smylie	6	6
WC	(United Kingdom) B Borneo (United Kingdom) C Wood	2	2
(United States) A Grousbeck (Japan) N Miyagi	0	4
(Italy) L Garrone (Italy) L Golarsa	6	6
(France) N Tauziat (Austria) J Wiesner	6	6
Q	(Australia) K-A Guse (Australia) J Hodder	2	3
LL	(United States) L Antonoplis (Sweden) M Strandlund	3	4
14	(Soviet Union) N Medvedeva (Soviet Union) L Meskhi	6	6
16	(South Africa) L Gregory (United States) G Magers	6	3	9
(Bulgaria) K Maleeva (Switzerland) M Maleeva-Fragnière	2	6	7
(Netherlands) M Bollegraf (New Zealand) B Cordwell	5	4
(United States) M Louie Harper (United States) P Mager	7	6
(France) P Paradis (France) C Suire	7	5	7
(Italy) L Ferrando (Socialist Federal Republic of Yugoslavia) S Goleš	5	7	5
(United States) C Benjamin (Australia) A Minter	0	1
2	(Puerto Rico) G Fernández (United States) M Navratilova	6	6

Second round
6	(United States) K Jordan (Australia) E Smylie	6	6
(Italy) L Garrone (Italy) L Golarsa	2	0
(France) N Tauziat (Austria) J Wiesner	6	6
14	(Soviet Union) N Medvedeva (Soviet Union) L Meskhi	3	3
16	(South Africa) L Gregory (United States) G Magers	6	6
(United States) M Louie Harper (United States) P Mager	4	1
(United States) C McHale (Austria) T Paszek	3	3
2	(Puerto Rico) G Fernández (United States) M Navratilova	6	6

Third round
6	(United States) K Jordan (Australia) E Smylie	4	6	6
(France) N Tauziat (Austria) J Wiesner	6	3	1
16	(South Africa) L Gregory (United States) G Magers	6	2	1
2	(Puerto Rico) G Fernández (United States) M Navratilova	3	6	6

Quarterfinals
6	(United States) K Jordan (Australia) E Smylie	6	2	6
2	(Puerto Rico) G Fernández (United States) M Navratilova	3	6	4
