= 1990 Wimbledon Championships – Mixed doubles =

Mixed doubles
- 1990 Wimbledon Championships

Final
- Champions: (United States) Rick Leach (United States) Zina Garrison
- Runners-up: (Australia) John Fitzgerald (Australia) Elizabeth Smylie
- Score: 7–5, 6–2

Details
- Draw: 64 (3 Q / 4 WC )
- Seeds: 16

Events
Singles	men	women		boys	girls
Doubles	men	women	mixed	boys	girls
WC Singles	men	women	quad
WC Doubles	men	women	quad
Legends	men	women	seniors
← 1989 ·	Wimbledon Championships	· 1991 →

Jim Pugh and Jana Novotná were the defending champions but lost in the semifinals to Rick Leach and Zina Garrison.

Leach and Garrison defeated John Fitzgerald and Elizabeth Smylie in the final, 7–5, 6–2 to win the mixed doubles tennis title at the 1990 Wimbledon Championships.

== Seeds ==
1. (United States) Jim Pugh / (Czechoslovakia) Jana Novotná (semifinals)
2. (South Africa) Pieter Aldrich / (South Africa) Elna Reinach (quarterfinals)
3. (United States) Rick Leach / (United States) Zina Garrison (champions)
4. (Australia) John Fitzgerald / (Australia) Elizabeth Smylie (final)
5. (Czechoslovakia) Tomáš Šmíd / (Czechoslovakia) Helena Suková (first round)
6. (South Africa) Danie Visser / (South Africa) Rosalyn Fairbank (quarterfinals)
7. (Brazil) Cássio Motta / (United States) Kathy Jordan (second round)
8. (Australia) Mark Kratzmann / (Netherlands) Brenda Schultz (first round)
9. (Australia) Darren Cahill / (Puerto Rico) Gigi Fernández (third round)
10. (United States) Robert Seguso / (United States) Lori McNeil (third round)
11. (United States) Patrick McEnroe / (United States) Meredith McGrath (second round)
12. (United States) Kelly Jones / (United States) Elise Burgin (second round)
13. (United States) Paul Annacone / (Spain) Arantxa Sánchez Vicario (third round)
14. (Australia) Todd Woodbridge / (Australia) Nicole Provis (third round)
15. (Australia) Mark Woodforde / (Australia) Hana Mandlíková (second round)
16. (Netherlands) Tom Nijssen / (Netherlands) Manon Bollegraf (third round)

Click on the seed number of a player to go to their draw section.

== Draw ==
=== Key ===
- Q = Qualifier
- WC = Wild card
- LL = Lucky loser
- Alt = Alternate
- SE = Special exempt
- PR = Protected ranking
- ITF = ITF entry
- JE = Junior exempt
- w/o = Walkover
- r = Retired
- d = Defaulted
- SR = Special ranking

=== Finals ===
Quarterfinals
1	(United States) Jim Pugh (Czechoslovakia) Jana Novotná	6	6
(United States) Shelby Cannon (United States) Robin White	1	3
3	(United States) Rick Leach (United States) Zina Garrison	2	6	7
6	(South Africa) Danie Visser (United States) Rosalyn Fairbank	6	4	5
(United Kingdom) Jeremy Bates (United Kingdom) Jo Durie	5	7^{8}	4
4	(Australia) John Fitzgerald (Australia) Elizabeth Smylie	7	6^{6}	6
(United States) Todd Nelson (United States) Gretchen Magers	6	7^{8}
2	(South Africa) Pieter Aldrich (South Africa) Elna Reinach	2	6^{6}

Semifinals
1	(United States) Jim Pugh (Czechoslovakia) Jana Novotná	6^{10}	6^{4}
3	(United States) Rick Leach (United States) Zina Garrison	7^{12}	7^{7}
4	(Australia) John Fitzgerald (Australia) Elizabeth Smylie	7^{10}	7
(United States) Kelly Jones (United States) Gretchen Magers	6^{8}	5

Final
3	(United States) Rick Leach (United States) Zina Garrison	7	6
4	(Australia) John Fitzgerald (Australia) Elizabeth Smylie	5	2

=== Top half ===
==== Section 1 ====
First round
1	(United States) J Pugh (Czechoslovakia) J Novotná	7^{8}	6
(Australia) J Stoltenberg (Australia) R McQuillan	6^{6}	0
(Iran) M Bahrami (France) C Tanvier	3	4
(United States) G Van Emburgh (United States) S Collins	6	6
(Czechoslovakia) C Suk (Czechoslovakia) R Rajchrtová	5	2
(Australia) L Warder (Australia) J Thompson	7	6
(Nigeria) N Odizor (West Germany) E Pfaff	7^{7}	3	4
10	(United States) R Seguso (United States) L McNeil	6^{5}	6	6
12	(United States) K Jones (United States) E Burgin	2	7^{7}	6
(Venezuela) A Mora (Peru) L Gildemeister	6	6^{5}	2
LL	(South Africa) P Norval (South Africa) M de Swardt	6	6
(Denmark) M Mortensen (Denmark) T Scheuer-Larsen	3	2
(United Kingdom) N Brown (United States) H Ludloff	6^{5}	4
(United States) S Cannon (United States) R White	7^{7}	6
(Brazil) N Aerts (Italy) L Ferrando	6^{5}	6	4^{r}
7	(Brazil) C Motta (United States) K Jordan	7^{7}	3	4

Second round
1	(United States) J Pugh (Czechoslovakia) J Novotná	7	7
(United States) G Van Emburgh (United States) S Collins	5	5
(Australia) L Warder (Australia) J Thompson	3	7^{7}	3
10	(United States) R Seguso (United States) L McNeil	6	6^{4}	6
12	(United States) K Jones (United States) E Burgin	2	4
LL	(South Africa) P Norval (South Africa) M de Swardt	6	6
(United States) S Cannon (United States) R White	5
7	(Brazil) C Motta (United States) K Jordan	2^{r}

Third round
1	(United States) J Pugh (Czechoslovakia) J Novotná	7^{7}	6
10	(United States) R Seguso (United States) L McNeil	6^{2}	4
LL	(South Africa) P Norval (South Africa) M de Swardt	5	6^{2}
(United States) S Cannon (United States) R White	7	7^{7}

Quarterfinals
1	(United States) J Pugh (Czechoslovakia) J Novotná	6	6
(United States) S Cannon (United States) R White	1	3

==== Section 2 ====
First round
3	(United States) R Leach (United States) Z Garrison	6	6
(Australia) D Macpherson (Australia) J Byrne	3	4
(United States) C Beckman (South Africa) L Gregory	7	2	2
(Australia) B Dyke (Australia) M Jaggard	5	6	6
(United Kingdom) N Broad (United States) T Phelps	6	7
(United States) S DeVries (United States) P Mager	4	5
WC	(United States) S Stewart (United Kingdom) S Smith	5	2
16	(Netherlands) T Nijssen (Netherlands) M Bollegraf	7	6
15	(Australia) M Woodforde (Australia) H Mandlíková	6	6
(United States) L Jensen (United States) M Werdel	1	3
LL	(United States) K Kinnear (South Africa) R Field	3	7^{7}	3
LL	(Canada) G Michibata (West Germany) A Huber	6	6^{2}	6
(United States) B Page (United States) J Smoller	6	5	6
(The Bahamas) R Smith (United States) K Adams	4	7	4
(United States) R Reneberg (United States) M Louie Harper	2	2
6	(South Africa) D Visser (United States) R Fairbank	6	6

Second round
3	(United States) R Leach (United States) Z Garrison	3	6	9
(Australia) B Dyke (Australia) M Jaggard	6	3	7
(United Kingdom) N Broad (United States) T Phelps	3	2
16	(Netherlands) T Nijssen (Netherlands) M Bollegraf	6	6
15	(Australia) M Woodforde (Australia) H Mandlíková	7^{8}	6^{3}	1
LL	(Canada) G Michibata (West Germany) A Huber	6^{6}	7^{7}	6
(United States) B Page (United States) J Smoller	2	6^{5}
6	(South Africa) D Visser (United States) R Fairbank	6	7^{7}

Third round
3	(United States) R Leach (United States) Z Garrison	7	6^{3}	6
16	(Netherlands) T Nijssen (Netherlands) M Bollegraf	5	7^{7}	4
LL	(Canada) G Michibata (West Germany) A Huber	4	6^{4}
6	(South Africa) D Visser (United States) R Fairbank	6	7^{7}

Quarterfinals
3	(United States) R Leach (United States) Z Garrison	2	6	7
6	(South Africa) D Visser (United States) R Fairbank	6	4	5

=== Bottom half ===
==== Section 3 ====
First round
5	(Czechoslovakia) T Šmíd (Czechoslovakia) H Suková	6	3	3
(United States) P Galbraith (Japan) N Miyagi	2	6	6
(Italy) D Nargiso (United States) A Grousbeck	5	2
(Australia) S Youl (Australia) A Minter	7	6
(United States) T Pawsat (United States) E Herr	5	1
(United Kingdom) J Bates (United Kingdom) J Durie	7	6
LL	(South Africa) L Bale (United States) J Thomas	3	5
11/ Q	(United States) P McEnroe (United States) M McGrath	6	7
9	(Australia) D Cahill (Puerto Rico) G Fernández	7^{7}	6
(Czechoslovakia) J Čihák (Czechoslovakia) J Pospíšilová	6^{4}	2
(United States) B Shelton (United States) A Grossman	5	7^{7}	3
Q	(New Zealand) B Derlin (New Zealand) J Richardson	7	6^{4}	6
WC	(United Kingdom) M Petchey (United Kingdom) S Loosemore	7^{7}	7^{7}
WC	(United Kingdom) D Ison (United Kingdom) A Simpkin	6^{4}	6^{3}
(United States) J Rive (United States) C Benjamin	3	5
4	(Australia) J Fitzgerald (Australia) E Smylie	6	7

Second round
(United States) P Galbraith (Japan) N Miyagi	6	6
(Australia) S Youl (Australia) A Minter	4	4
(United Kingdom) J Bates (United Kingdom) J Durie	6	6
11/ Q	(United States) P McEnroe (United States) M McGrath	2	3
9	(Australia) D Cahill (Puerto Rico) G Fernández	6^{2}	6	6
Q	(New Zealand) B Derlin (New Zealand) J Richardson	7^{7}	4	4
WC	(United Kingdom) M Petchey (United Kingdom) S Loosemore	4	1
4	(Australia) J Fitzgerald (Australia) E Smylie	6	6

Third round
(United States) P Galbraith (Japan) N Miyagi	2	3
(United Kingdom) J Bates (United Kingdom) J Durie	6	6
9	(Australia) D Cahill (Puerto Rico) G Fernández	2	1
4	(Australia) J Fitzgerald (Australia) E Smylie	6	6

Quarterfinals
(United Kingdom) J Bates (United Kingdom) J Durie	5	7^{8}	4
4	(Australia) J Fitzgerald (Australia) E Smylie	7	6^{6}	6

==== Section 4 ====
First round
8	(Australia) M Kratzmann (Netherlands) B Schultz	6^{2}	4
(United States) T Nelson (United States) G Magers	7^{7}	6
(United States) T Wilkison (United States) S Stafford	7^{7}	6
(South Africa) R Deppe (South Africa) D van Rensburg	6^{1}	4
(Netherlands) M Koevermans (Netherlands) H ter Riet	6	6
WC	(United Kingdom) N Fulwood (United Kingdom) J Salmon	2	3
(France) H Leconte (United States) E Nagelsen	5	6	3
13	(United States) P Annacone (Spain) A Sánchez Vicario	7	4	6
14	(Australia) T Woodbridge (Australia) N Provis	6	6
(South Africa) B Talbot (South Africa) L Barnard	3	2
(South Africa) C van Rensburg (Soviet Union) L Savchenko	6	7
(Australia) P Doohan (Canada) J Hetherington	3	5
(Venezuela) N Pereira (Soviet Union) N Zvereva	5	7	9
(South Africa) S Kruger (Australia) L Field	7	5	11
Q	(United States) B Garnett (Australia) K Radford	3	2
2	(South Africa) P Aldrich (South Africa) E Reinach	6	6

Second round
(United States) T Nelson (United States) G Magers	7^{7}	6
(United States) T Wilkison (United States) S Stafford	6^{2}	4
(Netherlands) M Koevermans (Netherlands) H ter Riet	2	5
13	(United States) P Annacone (Spain) A Sánchez Vicario	6	7
14	(Australia) T Woodbridge (Australia) N Provis	7^{7}	6
(South Africa) C van Rensburg (Soviet Union) L Savchenko	6^{2}	4
(South Africa) S Kruger (Australia) L Field	3	3
2	(South Africa) P Aldrich (South Africa) E Reinach	6	6

Third round
(United States) T Nelson (United States) G Magers	2	6	9
13	(United States) P Annacone (Spain) A Sánchez Vicario	6	3	7
14	(Australia) T Woodbridge (Australia) N Provis	6	4	0
2	(South Africa) P Aldrich (South Africa) E Reinach	3	6	6

Quarterfinals
(United States) T Nelson (United States) G Magers	6	7^{8}
2	(South Africa) P Aldrich (South Africa) E Reinach	2	6^{6}
