= Chris Cocotos =

American tennis player

- Country (sports): United States
- Plays: Right-handed

Singles
- Highest ranking: No. 895 (August 29, 1994)

Doubles
- Career record: 0–1
- Highest ranking: No. 452 (May 15, 1995)

Grand Slam doubles results
- US Open: 1R (1992)

Chris Cocotos is an American former professional tennis player.

Cocotos, an alumnus of The Benjamin School in North Palm Beach, Florida, was a national representative at junior level and played varsity tennis for Stanford University. His doubles partnership at Stanford with Alex O'Brien topped the collegiate rankings and they won the 1992 NCAA Division I doubles championships. The pair competed together in the men's doubles main draw of the 1992 US Open, where they fell in the first round to John McEnroe and Michael Stich.
