= Kristin Godridge =

Australian tennis player

- Country (sports): Australia
- Born: 7 February 1973 (age 52); Traralgon, Australia
- Turned pro: 1987
- Retired: 1997
- Prize money: $329,250

Singles
- Career record: 147–140
- Career titles: 0 WTA, 2 ITF
- Highest ranking: No. 79 (23 September 1991)

Grand Slam singles results
- Australian Open: 2R (1995)
- French Open: 2R (1991)
- Wimbledon: 4R (1992)
- US Open: 2R (1991)

Doubles
- Career record: 106–108
- Career titles: 1 WTA, 5 ITF
- Highest ranking: No. 68 (3 December 1990)

Grand Slam doubles results
- Australian Open: 3R (1991)
- French Open: 2R (1991, 1992, 1993)
- Wimbledon: 2R (1990)
- US Open: 2R (1991)

Mixed doubles

Grand Slam mixed doubles results
- Australian Open: 1R (1992)
- French Open: 1R (1995)
- Wimbledon: 1R (1991, 1996)

Kristin Godridge (born 7 February 1973) is a retired tennis player from Australia who competed on the WTA Tour from 1987 to 1996.

== Career ==
Godridge achieved a career-high singles ranking of world No. 79 in September 1991. Her highest doubles ranking was No. 68 in December 1990.

With partner Kirrily Sharpe, Godridge was girls' doubles champion at the 1990 US Open. The following year, she teamed with Kirrily Sharpe to reclaim the title. A highlight in her singles career came in 1992, when she reached the fourth round of Wimbledon. She had wins over Miriam Oremans, Claudia Kohde-Kilsch, and ninth-seed Manuela Maleeva-Fragniere before losing to third-seed Gabriela Sabatini.

As a tennis coach, Godridge is the director and founder of Australasia Tennis Aces, a tennis school in Hong Kong.

== WTA career finals ==
Legend
Grand Slam
Tier I
Tier II
Tier III
Tier IV & V

=== Doubles: 2 (1 title, 1 runner-up) ===
Result	Date	Tournament	Surface	Partner	Opponents	Score
Win	Sep 1990	Clarins Open, France	Clay	(Australia) Kirrily Sharpe	(France) Alexia Dechaume-Balleret (France) Nathalie Herreman	4–6, 6–3, 6–1
Loss	Nov 1995	Pattaya Open, Thailand	Hard	(Japan) Nana Smith Rogers	(Canada) Jill Hetherington (Australia) Kristine Kunce	6–2, 4–6, 3–6

== ITF finals ==
$100,000 tournaments
$75,000 tournaments
$50,000 tournaments
$25,000 tournaments
$10,000 tournaments

=== Singles (2–4) ===
Result	No.	Date	Tournament	Surface	Opponent	Score
Loss	1.	6 November 1989	ITF Nuriootpa, Australia	Hard	(United States) Allison Cooper	3–6, 6–2, 4–6
Loss	2.	19 November 1990	ITF Perth, Australia	Grass	(Australia) Rennae Stubbs	1–6, 1–6
Loss	3.	11 November 1991	ITF Mount Gambier, Australia	Hard	(Australia) Jenny Byrne	6–0, 4–6, 4–6
Win	4.	12 October 1992	ITF Burgdorf, Switzerland	Carpet (i)	(Czechoslovakia) Květa Peschke	7–6^{(2)}, 6–4
Loss	5.	16 August 1993	ITF Arzachena, Italy	Clay	(Italy) Linda Ferrando	4–6, 4–6
Win	6.	29 November 1993	ITF Singapore	Hard	(Indonesia) Romana Tedjakusuma	4–6, 6–4, 6–4

=== Doubles (5–6) ===
Result	No.	Date	Tournament	Surface	Partner	Opponents	Score
Loss	1.	21 March 1988	ITF Melbourne, Australia	Hard	(Australia) Kate McDonald	(Australia) Rachel McQuillan (Australia) Rennae Stubbs	4–6, 5–7
Loss	2.	4 November 1988	ITF Melbourne, Australia	Hard	(Bulgaria) Elena Pampoulova	(Australia) Natalia Leipus (Australia) Bernadette Randall	4–6, 7–6^{(5)}, 2–6
Win	3.	13 February 1989	ITF Adelaide, Australia	Hard	(Australia) Janine Thompson	(Australia) Kate McDonald (Australia) Rennae Stubbs	5–7, 6–2, 6–2
Loss	4.	19 November 1990	ITF Perth, Australia	Grass	(Australia) Kirrily Sharpe	(Australia) Jo-Anne Faull (Australia) Rennae Stubbs	2–6, 4–6
Win	5.	11 November 1991	ITF Mount Gambier, Australia	Hard	(Australia) Nicole Pratt	(Netherlands) Ingelise Driehuis (Australia) Louise Pleming	6–7, 6–3, 6–4
Win	6.	12 October 1992	ITF Burgdorf, Switzerland	Carpet (i)	(Australia) Nicole Pratt	(Poland) Isabela Listowska (Germany) Petra Winzenhöller	6–3, 6–0
Loss	7.	26 October 1992	ITF Jakarta, Indonesia	Clay	(Australia) Nicole Pratt	(Australia) Michelle Jaggard-Lai (Australia) Kristine Kunce	6–3, 3–6, 2–6
Win	8.	28 November 1994	ITF Port Pirie, Australia	Hard	(Australia) Kirrily Sharpe	(United States) Shannan McCarthy (Australia) Rachel McQuillan	7–6^{(6)}, 6–2
Win	9.	5 December 1994	ITF Nuriootpa, Australia	Hard	(Australia) Kirrily Sharpe	(Australia) Catherine Barclay (Australia) Kerry-Anne Guse	6–2, 6–7^{(5)}, 6–4
Loss	10.	24 April 1995	ITF Budapest, Hungary	Clay	(France) Alexandra Fusai	(Czech Republic) Eva Melicharová (Czech Republic) Helena Vildová	3–6, 4–6
Loss	11.	8 May 1995	ITF Szczecin, Poland	Clay	(Australia) Kirrily Sharpe	(Australia) Catherine Barclay (United Kingdom) Shirli-Ann Siddall	7–5, 5–7, 6–7
