= Aurora Gima =

Romanian-born American tennis player

- Country (sports): Romania; United States
- Born: November 7, 1974; Constanța, Romania
- Died: October 7, 2000 (aged 25); New York, United States
- Prize money: $44,840

Singles
- Career record: 107–112
- Career titles: 1 ITF
- Highest ranking: No. 164 (October 5, 1992)

Grand Slam singles results
- Australian Open: Q3 (1993)
- US Open: Q3 (1992)

Doubles
- Career record: 29–48
- Highest ranking: No. 399 (May 11, 1992)

Aurora Gima (November 7, 1974 – October 7, 2000) was a Romanian-born American professional tennis player.

Gima, originally from the Black Sea city of Constanța in Romania, was raised in New York from the mid-1980s. She competed on the professional tour in the 1990s and reached a career high singles ranking of 164, winning a $25,000 ITF title in Nigeria in 1991. At the 1992 US Open she won through to the final qualifying round, defeating Miriam Oremans en route. She also won two qualifying matches at the 1993 Australian Open, over Kristine Radford and Katarína Studeníková. Her only WTA Tour main draw appearance came as a doubles player, at Québec in 1993.

== ITF finals ==
Legend
$25,000 tournaments
$10,000 tournaments

=== Singles: 4 (1–3) ===
Outcome	No.	Date	Tournament	Surface	Opponent	Score
Runner-up	1.	June 16, 1991	Largo, United States	Clay	(United States) Rachel Ann Jensen	2–6, 2–6
Winner	1.	November 24, 1991	Okada, Nigeria	Hard	(Republic of Ireland) Siobhán Nicholson	6–1, 6–3
Runner-up	2.	May 31, 1992	Ashkelon, Israel	Hard	(Czechoslovakia) Katarína Studeníková	4–6, 4–6
Runner-up	3.	November 3, 1996	Tamaulipas. Mexico	Hard	(Venezuela) Milagros Sequera	6–4, 3–6, 4–6

=== Doubles: 2 (0–2) ===
Outcome	No.	Date	Tournament	Surface	Partner	Opponents	Score
Runner-up	1.	November 24, 1991	Okada, Nigeria	Hard	(United Kingdom) Amanda Evans	(United Kingdom) Caroline Billingham (United Kingdom) Virginia Humphreys-Davies	6–1, 4–6, 4–6
Runner-up	2.	October 27, 1996	Puebla, Mexico	Hard	(Mexico) Ana Paola González	(Mexico) Claudia Muciño (Ecuador) María Dolores Campana	1–6, 3–6
