= Andrei Rybalko =

Ukrainian tennis player

- Country (sports): Ukraine
- Born: 5 June 1972 (age 52); Kiev, Ukraine
- Height: 180 cm (5 ft 11 in)
- Prize money: $50,368

Singles
- Career record: 0–4
- Highest ranking: No. 239 (29 August 1994)

Grand Slam singles results
- Australian Open: Q1 (1997)
- Wimbledon: Q1 (1997)
- US Open: Q3 (1994)

Doubles
- Career record: 0–2
- Highest ranking: No 304 (28 February 1994)

Andrei Rybalko (born 5 June 1972) is a Ukrainian former professional tennis player.

== Career ==
Born in Kiev, Rybalko competed on the professional tour during the 1990s and had a career high singles ranking of 239, mostly playing at Challenger level. He made the occasional ATP Tour main draw appearance and reached the final qualifying round at the 1994 US Open.

Between 1994 and 2000 he was a regular member of the Ukraine Davis Cup team, appearing in a total of 14 ties. He won six singles rubbers for Ukraine, which included a victory over Norway's Christian Ruud, then ranked 61 in the world. In his Davis Cup career he also managed to take a set off top 10 player Goran Ivanisevic in 1996 and the following year pushed Tim Henman to five sets.

Rybalko, a former coach of Andriy Medvedev, is now based in Germany.
