= Nicole Hummel =

American tennis player

- Full name: Nicole Hummel
- Country (sports): United States
- Born: August 1, 1974 (age 51)
- Prize money: $20,422

Singles
- Highest ranking: No. 284 (July 26, 1993)

Grand Slam singles results
- US Open: Q3 (1992)

Doubles
- Highest ranking: No. 667 (February 7, 1994)

Nicole Hummel (born August 1, 1974) is an American former professional tennis player.

Hummel, who grew up in San Marino, California, was the 14 and Under Orange Bowl champion in 1988, then in 1989 won the USTA Girls 16 and Under Championships. In junior grand slam events she was a two-time singles semi-finalist, at the 1991 French Open and 1992 US Open.

Briefly playing on the professional tour after high school, Hummel made her main draw debut as a wild card at Indian Wells in 1992. She made further made draw appearances at the 1992 Lipton International Players Championships in Key Biscayne and the 1993 Amelia Island Championships, both as a qualifier. On three occasions she featured in the qualifying draw for the US Open, with her best performance coming in 1992 when she made it to the third qualifying round, with wins over future world number 11 Silvia Farina and Japan's Nana Miyagi.
