= Sébastien Leblanc =

Canadian tennis player (born 1973)

Sébastien LeBlanc
- Country (sports): Canada
- Born: 27 December 1973 (age 52) Montreal, Canada
- Height: 1.93 m (6 ft 4 in)
- Turned pro: 1994
- Retired: 1997
- Plays: Left-handed
- Prize money: $97,899

Singles
- Career record: 2–4
- Career titles: 0; 0 Challenger, 0 Futures
- Highest ranking: 361 (5 August 1996)

Grand Slam singles results
- Australian Open: Q1 (1996, 1997)

Other tournaments
- Olympic Games: 2R (1992)

Doubles
- Career record: 8–22
- Career titles: 0; 5 Challenger, 0 Futures
- Highest ranking: 127 (18 November 1996)

Grand Slam doubles results
- Australian Open: 1R (1997)
- US Open: Q1 (1995)

Other doubles tournaments
- Olympic Games: 2R (1992)
- Last updated on: 18 December 2021.

Sébastien LeBlanc (born 27 December 1973) is a former Canadian tour professional tennis player. Leblanc captured three junior Grand Slam titles and played Davis Cup for Canada. More of a doubles specialist, he won five Challenger events in doubles and reached a career-high doubles ranking of World No. 127.

== Junior career ==
Leblanc teamed with fellow Québécois and Montrealer Sébastien Lareau to capture first the 1990 French Open junior doubles title and then a month later the 1990 Wimbledon junior doubles title. In both finals they defeated the South African duo of Marcos Ondruska and Clinton Marsh in three sets at Roland Garros. Then in August Leblanc teamed with another Montrealer, Greg Rusedski, to capture the U.S. Open junior doubles crown, defeating Mårten Renström and Mikael Tillström in the final. Leblanc did not compete in the 1990 Australian Open missing out on a chance for completing the 'Grand Slam'. In singles he lost in the first round at both Roland Garros and Flushing Meadows and reached the third round of Wimbledon, falling to eventual champion Leander Paes in three sets.

== Senior career ==
Leblanc won the 1991 Montebello Challenger partnering Lareau and the 1995 Santiago Challenger playing with Brandon Coupe. The resident of Saint-Bruno-de-Montarville, Quebec won the Aptos Challenger three times in succession – from 1995 through 1997 – the first time playing with Brian MacPhie and the later two times partnering fellow Québécois and Montrealer Jocelyn Robichaud. In ATP Tour and Grand Slam events, Leblanc posted a career win–loss of 8 and 22 with his best result being reaching the quarter-finals of the Canadian Open in 1991, partnering Lareau. Leblanc also reached the second round of the 1992 Summer Olympics tournament, partnering Brian Gyetko. He played in the main draw of one Grand Slam event at senior level, the 1997 Australian Open – he and partner Mark Keil lost in the first round.

In singles, Leblanc reached a career-high ranking of world No. 361, in August 1996. His career Challenger event win–loss record stood at 3 wins, 9 losses, while at ATP Tour level it was 1 and 4. His sole top flight match win was over World No. 18 Tim Henman in the opening round of the Canadian Open.

=== Davis Cup ===
Leblanc sole rubber appearance came surprisingly in singles, in a 1997 America Group I semi-final tie versus Venezuela, played in April. He defeated José de Armas in a dead rubber in a tie Canada swept 5–0. The victory allowed gave Canada a place in qualifying for the World Group. They lost the qualifying tie in September however to Slovakia 1–4, despite playing the tie at home (in Jarry Stadium).

== Junior Grand Slam finals ==
=== Doubles: 3 (3 titles) ===
Result	Year	Tournament	Surface	Partner	Opponents	Score
Win	1990	French Open	Clay	(Canada) Sébastien Lareau	(South Africa) Clinton Marsh (South Africa) Marcos Ondruska	7–6, 6–7, 9–7
Win	1990	Wimbledon	Grass	(Canada) Sébastien Lareau	(South Africa) Clinton Marsh (South Africa) Marcos Ondruska	7–6^{(7–5)}, 4–6, 6–3
Win	1990	US Open	Hard	(United Kingdom) Greg Rusedski	(Sweden) Mårten Renström (Sweden) Mikael Tillström	6–7, 6–3, 6–4

== ATP Challenger and ITF Futures finals ==
=== Doubles: 9 (5–4) ===
Legend ATP Challenger (5–4) ITF Futures (0–0)	Finals by surface Hard (4–1) Clay (1–3) Grass (0–0) Carpet (0–0)

Result	W–L	Date	Tournament	Tier	Surface	Partner	Opponents	Score
Loss	0–1	Sep 1991	Graz, Austria	Challenger	Clay	(Germany) Markus Naewie	(Sweden) Jan Apell (Israel) Raviv Weidenfeld	3–6, 3–6
Win	1–1	Jul 1994	Montebello, Canada	Challenger	Hard	(Canada) Sébastien Lareau	(Spain) Sergio Gomez-Barrio (Canada) Brian Gyetko	6–2, 6–3
Loss	1–2	Jun 1995	Eisenach, Germany	Challenger	Clay	(United States) Chris Woodruff	(Germany) Dirk Dier (Germany) Lars Koslowski	6–3, 3–6, 6–7
Win	2–2	Jul 1995	Aptos, United States	Challenger	Hard	(United States) Brian Macphie	(United States) Bill Barber (United States) Ari Nathan	6–3, 6–2
Win	3–2	Nov 1995	Santiago, Chile	Challenger	Clay	(United States) Brandon Coupe	(Ecuador) Nicolás Lapentti (Chile) Gabriel Silberstein	3–6, 7–5, 6–4
Loss	3–3	Apr 1996	Prague, Czech Republic	Challenger	Clay	(North Macedonia) Aleksandar Kitinov	(United States) Donald Johnson (United States) Francisco Montana	6–3, 3–6, 1–6
Win	4–3	Jul 1996	Aptos, United States	Challenger	Hard	(Canada) Jocelyn Robichaud	(South Africa) Neville Godwin (United States) Geoff Grant	7–6, 6–7, 7–5
Loss	4–4	Sep 1996	Aruba, Aruba	Challenger	Hard	(South Africa) Grant Stafford	(India) Mahesh Bhupathi (India) Leander Paes	2–6, 2–6
Win	5–4	Jul 1997	Aptos, United States	Challenger	Hard	(Canada) Jocelyn Robichaud	(United States) David Caldwell (United States) Adam Peterson	7–6, 6–4
