= Louise Stacey =

Australian tennis player

- Country (sports): Australia
- Born: 10 January 1972 (age 53)
- Prize money: $59,732

Singles
- Career titles: 4 ITF
- Highest ranking: No. 222 (2 December 1991)

Grand Slam singles results
- Australian Open: 1R (1989, 1990, 1991, 1992)

Doubles
- Career titles: 4 ITF
- Highest ranking: No. 113 (11 January 1993)

Grand Slam doubles results
- Australian Open: 2R (1991, 1992)

Louise Stacey (born 10 January 1972) is an Australian former professional tennis player.

== Biography ==
=== Early career ===
Stacey, who grew up in Adelaide, won the 1983 Australian 12-and-under Championships. In 1987, aged 15, she became the youngest ever winner of the Australian Hard Court Championships. She was a girls' singles finalist at the 1990 Australian Open, losing in three sets to Magdalena Maleeva.

=== Professional tour ===
Stacey competed in either the singles or doubles main draws at five editions of the Australian Open. She made it to the final round of the Wimbledon qualifiers in 1991 and reached her highest singles ranking of 222 that year, which also included winning three ITF singles titles. As a doubles player, Stacey had a best ranking of 113 in the world and won four ITF titles during her career. She reached two WTA Tour doubles quarterfinals, at Auckland and Wellington in 1992.

== ITF Circuit finals ==
$25,000 tournaments
$10,000 tournaments

=== Singles (4–3) ===
Outcome	No.	Date	Tournament	Surface	Opponent	Score
Winner	1.	1 November 1987	ITF Gold Coast, Australia	Hard	(Australia) Jane Morro	0–6, 7–6, 6–2
Runner-up	1.	4 December 1988	ITF Melbourne, Australia	Hard	(Australia) Louise Field	6–4, 2–6, 1–6
Runner-up	2.	17 February 1991	ITF Mildura, Australia	Grass	(Australia) Tracey Morton-Rodgers	3–6, 4–6
Winner	2.	4 August 1991	ITF Chatham, United States	Hard	(United States) Susan Gilchrist	6–2, 6–4
Winner	3.	11 August 1991	ITF College Park, United States	Hard	(United States) Kristine Kurth	6–0, 6–2
Winner	4.	18 November 1991	ITF Nuriootpa, Australia	Hard	(Australia) Nicole Pratt	3–6, 6–4, 7–5
Runner-up	3.	12 July 1992	ITF Indianapolis, United States	Hard	(United States) Susan Sloane	4–6, 4–6

=== Doubles (4–4) ===
Outcome	No.	Date	Tournament	Surface	Partner	Opponents	Score
Runner-up	1.	19 November 1989	ITF Gold Coast, Australia	Hard	(Australia) Jane Taylor	(Australia) Kristine Kunce (Australia) Kate McDonald	4–6, 2–6
Runner-up	2.	13 May 1990	Swansea, United Kingdom	Clay	(Australia) Catherine Barclay	(Australia) Nicole Pratt (Australia) Kirrily Sharpe	1–6, 2–6
Runner-up	3.	20 May 1990	Bournemouth, United Kingdom	Clay	(Australia) Catherine Barclay	(Australia) Nicole Pratt (Australia) Kirrily Sharpe	1–6, 2–6
Runner-up	4.	8 July 1991	Erlangen, Germany	Clay	(Australia) Angie Cunningham	(Soviet Union) Viktoria Milvidskaia (Germany) Maja Živec-Škulj	4–6, 4–6
Winner	1.	15 July 1991	Darmstadt, Germany	Clay	(Australia) Angie Cunningham	(Germany) Martina Pawlik (United States) Lisa Seemann	6–1, 6–2
Winner	2.	25 November 1991	Mildura, Australia	Hard	(Australia) Catherine Barclay	(Netherlands) Ingelise Driehuis (Australia) Louise Pleming	6–4, 6–3
Winner	3.	16 November 1992	Mount Gambier, Australia	Clay	(Australia) Catherine Barclay	(Czechoslovakia) Janette Husárová (Czechoslovakia) Eva Martincová	7–6^{(7)}, 6–7^{(4)}, 7–6^{(3)}
Winner	4.	6 December 1992	ITF Mildura, Australia	Hard	(Australia) Catherine Barclay	(Australia) Michelle Jaggard-Lai (Australia) Elizabeth Smylie	6–3, 6–4
