= Clinton Marsh =

South African tennis player

- Country (sports): South Africa
- Residence: Little Silver, New Jersey
- Born: 19 January 1972 (age 54) Durban, South Africa
- Height: 6 ft 2 in (188 cm)
- Turned pro: 1990
- Plays: Right-handed
- Prize money: $63,729

Singles
- Career record: 1–5
- Career titles: 0
- Highest ranking: No. 245 (11 May 1992)

Grand Slam singles results
- Australian Open: 1R (1995)

Doubles
- Career record: 0–2
- Career titles: 0
- Highest ranking: No. 339 (11 May 1992)

Clinton Marsh (born 19 January 1972) is a former professional tennis player from South Africa.

== Career ==
Marsh was a gifted junior player, ranked number one in his country every year from the age of 12 to 17. He and Marcos Ondruska were boys' doubles finalists at the 1990 French Open and 1990 Wimbledon Championships. They lost both finals to the Canadian pairing of Sébastien Lareau and Sébastien Leblanc.

Playing as a qualifier, Marsh lost to 16th seed Richard Krajicek in the first round of the 1995 Australian Open.
