= Tatiana Ignatieva =

Belarusian tennis player

- Country (sports): Soviet Union (1989–1991); Belarus (1991–1997)
- Born: 11 June 1974 (age 51) Minsk, Soviet Union
- Height: 1.73 m (5 ft 8 in)
- Prize money: $153,169

Singles
- Career record: 78–68
- Career titles: 1 ITF
- Highest ranking: No. 91 (9 August 1993)

Grand Slam singles results
- Australian Open: 2R (1994)
- French Open: 1R (1993, 1995)
- Wimbledon: 1R (1993, 1995)
- US Open: 1R (1995)

Doubles
- Career record: 9–12
- Career titles: 0
- Highest ranking: No. 570 (12 August 1991)

Team competitions
- Fed Cup: 13–11

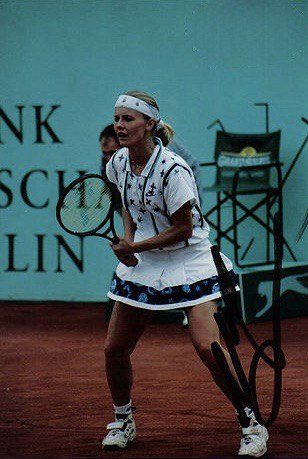
Tatiana Ignatieva WTA German Open 1994

Tatiana Ignatieva (Belarusian: Таццяна Ігнацьева, Russian: Татьяна Игнатьева; born 11 June 1974) is a former Belarusian tennis player.

Ignatieva won one singles title ($75k) on the ITF Circuit during her career. On 9 August 1993, she reached her best singles ranking of world No. 91. On 12 August 1991, she peaked at No. 570 in the WTA doubles rankings.

Ignatieva has a 13–11 record for the Belarus Fed Cup team and appeared in the main draw of all four Grand Slam tournaments.

== ITF finals ==
=== Singles (1–2) ===
Legend $100,000 tournaments $75,000 tournaments $50,000 tournaments $25,000 tournaments $10,000 tournaments	Finals by surface Hard (0–1) Clay (1–1) Grass (0–0) Carpet (0–0)

Result	No.	Date	Tournament	Surface	Opponent	Score
Loss	1.	20 July 1992	ITF Roanoke, United States	Hard	(Japan) Ai Sugiyama	2–6, 3–2 ret.
Win	1.	1 August 1994	ITF Sopot, Poland	Clay	(Austria) Sandra Dopfer	2–6, 6–3, 6–2
Loss	2.	19 August 1996	ITF Kyiv, Ukraine	Clay	(Russia) Evgenia Kulikovskaya	1–6, 5–7

=== Doubles (0–1) ===
Legend $100,000 tournaments $75,000 tournaments $50,000 tournaments $25,000 tournaments $10,000 tournaments	Finals by surface Hard (0–0) Clay (0–1) Grass (0–0) Carpet (0–0)

Result	No.	Date	Tournament	Surface	Partner	Opponents	Score
Loss	1.	15 October 1990	ITF Supetar, Yugoslavia	Clay	(Soviet Union) Irina Sukhova	(Socialist Federal Republic of Yugoslavia) Ivona Horvat (Czechoslovakia) Eva Martincová	3–6, 3–6

== Junior Grand Slam finals ==
=== Girls' singles ===
Outcome	Year	Championship	Surface	Opponent	Score
Runner-up	1990	French Open	Clay	(Bulgaria) Magdalena Maleeva	2–6, 3–6

=== Girls' doubles ===
Outcome	Year	Championship	Surface	Partner	Opponents	Score
Runner-up	1990	French Open	Clay	(Soviet Union) Irina Sukhova	(Romania) Ruxandra Dragomir (Romania) Irina Spîrlea	3–6, 1–6
