= 1991 US Open – Women's singles qualifying =

Women's singles qualifying
- 1991 US Open

Events
Singles	men	women		boys	girls
Doubles	men	women	mixed	boys	girls
WC Singles	men	women	quad
WC Doubles	men	women	quad
Legends	men	women	mixed

Qualification
Singles	men	women
- US Open

Players who neither had high enough rankings nor received wild cards to enter the main draw of the annual US Open Tennis Championships participated in a qualifying tournament held over several days before the event.

== Seeds ==
1. (France) Isabelle Demongeot (second round)
2. (Japan) Mana Endo (second round)
3. (France) Sandrine Testud (second round)
4. (Japan) Nana Smith (first round)
5. (Germany) Maja Živec-Škulj (first round)
6. (Soviet Union) Eugenia Maniokova (qualified)
7. (Netherlands) Stephanie Rottier (qualified)
8. (Netherlands) Petra Kamstra (first round)
9. (Belgium) Sandra Wasserman (second round)
10. (France) Nathalie Herreman (qualifying competition, lucky loser)
11. (Canada) Rene Simpson (qualified)
12. (Netherlands) Miriam Oremans (first round)
13. (United States) Ann Henricksson (second round)
14. (Japan) Misumi Miyauchi (first round)
15. (Poland) Katarzyna Nowak (qualified)
16. (Australia) Michelle Jaggard-Lai (qualifying competition)

== Qualifiers ==
1. (Belgium) Dominique Monami
2. (Canada) Rene Simpson
3. (Poland) Katarzyna Nowak
4. (France) Sybille Niox-Château
5. (Russia) Eugenia Maniokova
6. (Germany) Eva Pfaff
7. (Netherlands) Stephanie Rottier
8. (United States) Renata Marcinkowska

== Lucky losers ==
1. (France) Nathalie Herreman

== Qualifying draw ==
Key

- Q = Qualifier
- WC = Wild card
- LL = Lucky loser
- Alt = Alternate
- ITF = ITF entry
- PR = Protected ranking
- SR = Special ranking
- SE = Special exempt
- JE = Junior exempt
- JR = Junior Accelerator Programme entrant
- CO = College Accelerator Programme entrant
- NG = Next Gen Accelerator Program entrant
- w/o = Walkover
- r = Retired
- d = Defaulted

=== First qualifier ===
First round
1	(France) Isabelle Demongeot	6	4	6
(France) Nathalie Housset	3	6	2
(Belgium) Dominique Monami	7	6
(Belgium) Ann Devries	5	2
WC	(Jamaica) Iwalani McCalla	3	4
(United States) Katrina Adams	6	6
(United States) Andrea Farley	2	1
13	(United States) Ann Henricksson	6	6

Second round
1	(France) Isabelle Demongeot	2	3
(Belgium) Dominique Monami	6	6
(United States) Katrina Adams	6	6
13	(United States) Ann Henricksson	3	2

Qualifying competition
(Belgium) Dominique Monami	7	6
(United States) Katrina Adams	5	1

=== Second qualifier ===
First round
11	(Canada) Rene Simpson	6	6
(Australia) Rennae Stubbs	1	4
(United States) Stacey Schefflin	6	6
(Norway) Amy Jönsson Raaholt	4	1
(United States) Camille Benjamin	4	5
(Canada) Jill Hetherington	6	7
(United States) Mary-Lou Daniels	4	6	6
5	(Germany) Maja Živec-Škulj	6	0	0

Second round
11	(Canada) Rene Simpson	6	7^{7}
(United States) Stacey Schefflin	2	6^{5}
(Canada) Jill Hetherington	7	6
(United States) Mary-Lou Daniels	5	2

Qualifying competition
11	(Canada) Rene Simpson	5	6	7
(Canada) Jill Hetherington	7	3	5

=== Third qualifier ===
First round
3	(France) Sandrine Testud	6	7^{7}
(Brazil) Cláudia Chabalgoity	3	6^{3}
WC	(New Zealand) Hana Guy	4	0
(United Kingdom) Sarah Loosemore	6	6
WC	(United States) Kori Davidson	1	7	3
(United States) Caroline Kuhlman	6	5	6
(Australia) Jo-Anne Faull	4	2
15	(Poland) Katarzyna Nowak	6	6

Second round
3	(France) Sandrine Testud	3	4
(United Kingdom) Sarah Loosemore	6	6
(United States) Caroline Kuhlman	3	3
15	(Poland) Katarzyna Nowak	6	6

Qualifying competition
(United Kingdom) Sarah Loosemore	3	0
15	(Poland) Katarzyna Nowak	6	6

=== Fourth qualifier ===
First round
9	(Belgium) Sandra Wasserman	6	6
(United States) Elly Hakami	3	2
(France) Sybille Niox-Château	6	6
(Japan) Kumiko Okamoto	2	3
WC	(Japan) Akemi Nishiya	4	2
WC	(United States) Anne Miller	6	6
(Greece) Christína Papadáki	3	7^{7}	6
8	(Netherlands) Petra Kamstra	6	6^{4}	4

Second round
9	(Belgium) Sandra Wasserman	0	5
(France) Sybille Niox-Château	6	7
WC	(United States) Anne Miller	2	1
(Greece) Christína Papadáki	6	6

Qualifying competition
(France) Sybille Niox-Château	7^{7}	6
(Greece) Christína Papadáki	6^{1}	3

=== Fifth qualifier ===
First round
6	(Soviet Union) Eugenia Maniokova	1	6	7
(United States) Lisa Raymond	6	4	5
(United States) Luanne Spadea	3	6	6
WC	(United States) Nicole London	6	4	3
(United States) Beverly Bowes	6	5	2
(United States) Louise Allen	2	7	6
(United States) Sandy Collins	4	6	7^{7}
14	(Japan) Misumi Miyauchi	6	4	6^{5}

Second round
6	(Soviet Union) Eugenia Maniokova	6	6
(United States) Luanne Spadea	4	2
(United States) Louise Allen	6	5	4
(United States) Sandy Collins	1	7	6

Qualifying competition
6	(Soviet Union) Eugenia Maniokova	3	7	6
(United States) Sandy Collins	6	5	4

=== Sixth qualifier ===
First round
12	(Netherlands) Miriam Oremans	1	4
(United States) Cammy MacGregor	6	6
(Australia) Nicole Pratt	3	4
(Australia) Louise Field	6	6
(Germany) Eva Pfaff	6	6
(New Zealand) Claudine Toleafoa	2	4
(United Kingdom) Amanda Grunfeld	3	7^{7}	6
4	(Japan) Nana Smith	6	6^{5}	4

Second round
(United States) Cammy MacGregor	2	6	3
(Australia) Louise Field	6	3	6
(Germany) Eva Pfaff	4	6	6
(United Kingdom) Amanda Grunfeld	6	4	1

Qualifying competition
(Australia) Louise Field	6^{6}	2
(Germany) Eva Pfaff	7^{8}	6

=== Seventh qualifier ===
First round
7	(Netherlands) Stephanie Rottier	6	6
(Germany) Anouschka Popp	3	0
(United States) Alysia May	4	4
(France) Maïder Laval	6	6
(Netherlands) Caroline Vis	6	6
(Germany) Christiane Hofmann	4	3
(New Zealand) Belinda Cordwell	1	4
16	(Australia) Michelle Jaggard-Lai	6	6

Second round
7	(Netherlands) Stephanie Rottier	6	7
(France) Maïder Laval	3	5
(Netherlands) Caroline Vis	3	4
16	(Australia) Michelle Jaggard-Lai	6	6

Qualifying competition
7	(Netherlands) Stephanie Rottier	6	6
16	(Australia) Michelle Jaggard-Lai	1	4

=== Eighth qualifier ===
First round
10	(France) Nathalie Herreman	6	6
WC	(United States) Nicole Hummel	1	1
WC	(United States) Pam Nelson	6	6
(Canada) Maureen Drake	2	2
(Australia) Kristine Kunce	6^{1}	5
(United States) Renata Baranski	7^{7}	7
(Peru) Pilar Vásquez	3	2
2	(Japan) Mana Endo	6	6

Second round
10	(France) Nathalie Herreman	6	6
WC	(United States) Pam Nelson	3	3
(United States) Renata Baranski	7^{7}	4	6
2	(Japan) Mana Endo	6^{1}	6	3

Qualifying competition
10	(France) Nathalie Herreman	4	3
(United States) Renata Baranski	6	6
