= 1991 in tennis =

This page covers all the important events in the sport of tennis in 1991. It provides the results of notable tournaments throughout the year on both the ATP and WTA Tours, the Davis Cup, and the Fed Cup.

== ITF ==
=== Grand Slam events ===
==== Singles ====
	Championship	Champions	Finalists	Score in the final
Men	Australian Open	(Germany) Boris Becker	(Czechoslovakia) Ivan Lendl	1–6, 6–4, 6–4, 6–4 (Note: It was Becker's 5th career Grand Slam title and his 1st Australian Open title. He became the first male German player to win an Australian Open singles title.)
Men	French Open	(United States) Jim Courier	(United States) Andre Agassi (Note: It was the first all-American men's singles final since 1954, when Tony Trabert beat Art Larsen.)	3–6, 6–4, 2–6, 6–1, 6–4 (Note: It was Courier's third title of the year, and his fourth overall. It was his first career Grand Slam title.)
Men	Wimbledon	(Germany) Michael Stich	(Germany) Boris Becker	6–4, 7–6^{(7–4)}, 6–4 (Note: It was Stich's 1st career Grand Slam title and his 1st Wimbledon title.)
Men	US Open	(Sweden) Stefan Edberg	(United States) Jim Courier	6–2, 6–4, 6–0 (Note: It was Edberg's 5th career Grand Slam title and his 1st US Open title.)
Women	Australian Open	(Socialist Federal Republic of Yugoslavia) Monica Seles	(Czechoslovakia) Jana Novotná	5–7, 6–3, 6–1 (Note: It was Seles's 2nd career Grand Slam title and her 1st Australian Open title. She became the only Yugoslav player – male or female – to win a Grand Slam singles title.)
Women	French Open	(Socialist Federal Republic of Yugoslavia) Monica Seles	(Spain) Arantxa Sánchez	6–3, 6–4 (Note: It was Seles's 4th title of the year, and her 14th overall. It was her 3rd career Grand Slam title, and her 2nd French Open title.)
Women	Wimbledon	(Germany) Steffi Graf	(Argentina) Gabriela Sabatini	6–4, 3–6, 8–6 (Note: It was Graf's 11th career Grand Slam title and her 3rd Wimbledon title.)
Women	US Open	(Socialist Federal Republic of Yugoslavia) Monica Seles	(United States) Martina Navratilova	7–6^{(7–1)}, 6–1 (Note: It was Seles' 4th career Grand Slam title and her 1st US Open title.)

==== Doubles ====
	Championship	Champions	Finalists	Score in the final
Men	Australian Open	(United States) Scott Davis (United States) David Pate	(United States) Patrick McEnroe (United States) David Wheaton	6–7^{(4–7)}, 7–6^{(10–8)}, 6–3, 7–5 (Note: It was Davis' only career Grand Slam title. It was Pate's only career Grand Slam title.)
Men	French Open	(Australia) John Fitzgerald (Sweden) Anders Järryd	(United States) Rick Leach (United States) Jim Pugh	6–0, 7–6^{(7–2)}
Men	Wimbledon	(Australia) John Fitzgerald (Sweden) Anders Järryd	(Argentina) Javier Frana (Mexico) Leonardo Lavalle	6–3, 6–4, 6–7^{(7–9)}, 6–1 (Note: It was Fitzgerald's 7th career Grand Slam title and his 2nd Wimbledon title. It was Järryd's 7th career Grand Slam title and his 2nd and last Wimbledon title.)
Men	US Open	(Australia) John Fitzgerald (Sweden) Anders Järryd	(United States) Scott Davis (United States) David Pate	6–3, 3–6, 6–3, 6–3 (Note: It was Fitzgerald's 9th and last career Grand Slam title and his 3rd US Open title. It was Järryd's 8th and last career Grand Slam title and his 2nd US Open title.)
Women	Australian Open	(United States) Patty Fendick (United States) Mary Joe Fernández	(United States) Gigi Fernández (Czechoslovakia) Jana Novotná	7–6^{(7–4)}, 6–1 (Note: It was Fendick's only career Grand Slam title. It was Fernandez's 1st career Grand Slam title and her only Australian Open title.)
Women	French Open	(United States) Gigi Fernández (Czechoslovakia) Jana Novotná	(Soviet Union) Larisa Savchenko-Neiland (Soviet Union) Natalia Zvereva	6–4, 6–0
Women	Wimbledon	(Soviet Union) Larisa Savchenko-Neiland (Soviet Union) Natasha Zvereva	(Puerto Rico) Gigi Fernández (Czechoslovakia) Jana Novotná	6–4, 3–6, 8–6 (Note: It was Savchenko's 2nd career Grand Slam title and her 1st Wimbledon title. It was Zvereva's 3rd career Grand Slam title and her 1st Wimbledon title.)
Women	US Open	(United States) Pam Shriver (Soviet Union) Natasha Zvereva	(Czechoslovakia) Jana Novotná (Soviet Union) Larisa Savchenko-Neiland	6–4, 4–6, 7–6^{(7–5)} (Note: It was Shriver's 22nd and last career Grand Slam title and her 5th US Open title. It was Zvereva's 4th career Grand Slam title and her 1st US Open title.)
Mixed	Australian Open	(United Kingdom) Jeremy Bates (United Kingdom) Jo Durie	(United States) Scott Davis (United States) Robin White	2–6, 6–4, 6–4 (Note: It was Durie's 2nd and last career Grand Slam title and her only Australian Open title. It was Bates' 2nd and last career Grand Slam title and his only Australian Open title.)
Mixed	French Open	(Czechoslovakia) Cyril Suk (Czechoslovakia) Helena Suková	(Netherlands) Paul Haarhuis (Netherlands) Caroline Vis	3–6, 6–4, 6–1
Mixed	Wimbledon	(Australia) John Fitzgerald (Australia) Elizabeth Smylie	(United States) Jim Pugh (Soviet Union) Natasha Zvereva	7–6^{(7–4)}, 6–2 (Note: It was Smylie's 4th and last career Grand Slam title and her 2nd Wimbledon title. It was Fitzgerald's 8th career Grand Slam title and his 3rd and last Wimbledon title.)
Mixed	US Open	(Netherlands) Manon Bollegraf (Netherlands) Tom Nijssen	(Spain) Arantxa Sánchez (Spain) Emilio Sánchez	6–2, 7–6^{(7–2)} (Note: It was Bollegraf's 2nd career Grand Slam title and her 1st US Open title. It was Nijssen's 2nd and last career Grand Slam title and his only US Open title.)

=== Davis Cup ===
1991 champions
(France)
France
7th title

France
3
Palais des Sports de Gerland, Lyon, France
29 November – 1 December
Carpet (indoors)

United States
1

			1	2	3	4	5
1	(France) (United States)	Guy Forget; Andre Agassi	7^{9} 6^{7}	2; 6	1; 6	2; 6
2	(France) (United States)	Henri Leconte; Pete Sampras	6; 4	7; 5	6; 4
3	(France) (United States)	Guy Forget / Henri Leconte; Ken Flach / Robert Seguso	6; 1	6; 4	4; 6	6; 2
4	(France) (United States)	Guy Forget; Pete Sampras	7^{8} 6^{6}	3; 6	6; 3	6; 4
5	(France) (United States)	Henri Leconte; Andre Agassi						not played

=== Federation Cup ===
1991 champions
(Spain)
Spain
1st title

United States
1
Nottingham Tennis Centre, Nottingham, United Kingdom
28 July
Hard

Spain
2

			1	2	3
1	(United States) (Spain)	Jennifer Capriati; Conchita Martínez	4; 6	7^{7} 6^{3}	6; 1
2	(United States) (Spain)	Mary Joe Fernández; Arantxa Sánchez	3; 6	4; 6
3	(United States) (Spain)	Gigi Fernández / Zina Garrison-Jackson; Conchita Martínez / Arantxa Sánchez	6; 3	1; 6	1; 6

=== Hopman Cup ===
1991 champions
(Socialist Federal Republic of Yugoslavia)
Yugoslavia
1st title

Yugoslavia
3
Burswood Entertainment Complex, Perth, Australia
27 December 1990 – 4 January 1991
Hard (indoor)

United States
0

			1	2	3
1	(Socialist Federal Republic of Yugoslavia) (United States)	Monica Seles; Zina Garrison	6; 1	6; 1
2	(Socialist Federal Republic of Yugoslavia) (United States)	Goran Prpić; David Wheaton	4; 6	6; 3	7; 5
3	(Socialist Federal Republic of Yugoslavia) (United States)	Monica Seles / Goran Prpić; Zina Garrison / David Wheaton	8; 3

=== ITF tournaments ===
- Men's circuit
- Women's circuit

== ATP / WTA ==
=== Year-end Championships ===
==== Singles ====
	Championship	Champions	Finalists	Score in the final
Men	Frankfurt	(United States) Pete Sampras	(United States) Jim Courier	3–6, 7–6^{(7–5)}, 6–3, 6–4
Women	New York	(Socialist Federal Republic of Yugoslavia) Monica Seles	(United States) Martina Navratilova	6–4, 3–6, 7–5, 6–0

==== Doubles ====
	Championship	Champions	Finalists	Score in the final
Men	Johannesburg	(Australia) John Fitzgerald (Sweden) Anders Järryd	(United States) Ken Flach (United States) Robert Seguso	6–4, 6–4, 2–6, 6–4
Women	New York	(United States) Martina Navratilova (United States) Pam Shriver	(United States) Gigi Fernández (Czechoslovakia) Jana Novotná	4–6, 7–5, 6–4

=== Grand Slam Cup ===
==== Singles ====
	Championship	Champions	Finalists	Score in the final
Men	Munich	(United States) David Wheaton	(United States) Michael Chang	7–5, 6–2, 6–4

== Other tournaments ==
=== Mediterranean Games ===
==== Singles ====
	Championship	Gold medalists	Silver medalists	Bronze medalists
Men	Athens	(Italy) Stefano Pescosolido	(Italy) Massimo Cierro	(Italy) Paolo Pambianco
Women	Athens	(Italy) Katia Piccolini	(Spain) Pilar Pérez	(Italy) Nathalie Baudone

==== Doubles ====
	Championship	Gold medalists	Silver medalists	Bronze medalists
Men	Athens	(Italy) Massimo Boscatto (Italy) Stefano Pescosolido	(Spain) Alberto Berasategui (Spain) Àlex Corretja	(Morocco) Younes El Aynaoui (Morocco) Mohammed Ridaoui
Women	Athens	(Italy) Nathalie Baudone (Italy) Katia Piccolini	(Italy) Francesca Romano (Italy) Elena Savoldi	(Spain) Neus Ávila (Spain) Pilar Pérez
