= 1992 Australian Open – Women's singles qualifying =

Women's singles qualifying
- 1992 Australian Open

Events
Singles	men	women		boys	girls
Doubles	men	women	mixed	boys	girls
WC Singles	men	women	quad
WC Doubles	men	women	quad
Legends	men	women	mixed

Qualification
Singles	men	women
- Australian Open

This article displays the qualifying draw for women's singles at the 1992 Australian Open.

== Seeds ==
1. (Hungary) Andrea Temesvári (first round)
2. (Netherlands) Miriam Oremans (second round)
3. (Japan) Misumi Miyauchi (first round)
4. (Croatia) Nadin Ercegović (first round)
5. (United States) Ann Henricksson (first round)
6. (United States) Jessica Emmons (qualified)
7. (China) Fang Li (qualified)
8. (Netherlands) Stephanie Rottier (qualifying competition)
9. (Israel) Ilana Berger (first round)
10. (United States) Stacey Martin (first round)
11. (Finland) Nanne Dahlman (qualified)
12. (Australia) Kristine Kunce (first round)
13. (Japan) Tamaka Takagi (second round)
14. (Czechoslovakia) Zdeňka Málková (first round)
15. (United States) Andrea Leand (second round)
16. (United Kingdom) Sarah Loosemore (second round)

== Qualifiers ==
1. (United States) Patti O'Reilly
2. (China) Fang Li
3. (Finland) Nanne Dahlman
4. (Mexico) Angélica Gavaldón
5. (Japan) Yone Kamio
6. (France) Nathalie Housset
7. (United States) Jessica Emmons
8. (United States) Nicole Arendt

== Lucky losers ==
1. (Australia) Jo-Anne Faull
2. (Canada) Maureen Drake
3. (Belgium) Ann Devries

== Qualifying draw ==
Key

- Q = Qualifier
- WC = Wild card
- LL = Lucky loser
- Alt = Alternate
- ITF = ITF entry
- PR = Protected ranking
- SR = Special ranking
- SE = Special exempt
- JE = Junior exempt
- JR = Junior Accelerator Programme entrant
- CO = College Accelerator Programme entrant
- NG = Next Gen Accelerator Program entrant
- w/o = Walkover
- r = Retired
- d = Defaulted

=== First qualifier ===
First round
1	(Hungary) Andrea Temesvári	1	3
(Canada) Jill Hetherington	6	6
(South Africa) Janine Humphreys	1	2
(France) Alexandra Fusai	6	6
(United States) Patti O'Reilly	6	6
WC	(Australia) Lisa McShea	3	4
(Australia) Kerry-Anne Guse	6	6
9	(Israel) Ilana Berger	3	4

Second round
(Canada) Jill Hetherington	3	6	6
(France) Alexandra Fusai	6	2	1
(United States) Patti O'Reilly	4	6	6
(Australia) Kerry-Anne Guse	6	4	1

Qualifying competition
(Canada) Jill Hetherington	2	3
(United States) Patti O'Reilly	6	6

=== Second qualifier ===
First round
14	(Czechoslovakia) Zdeňka Málková	6^{4}	3
(Australia) Clare Thompson	7^{7}	6
(United States) Rachel Jensen	6^{0}	4
WC	(Australia) Kate McDonald	7^{7}	6
(Chinese Taipei) Wang Shi-ting	6	0	1
(New Zealand) Claudine Toleafoa	0	6	6
WC	(Australia) Shareen Bottrell	0	4
7	(China) Fang Li	6	6

Second round
(Australia) Clare Thompson	7^{7}	6
WC	(Australia) Kate McDonald	6^{3}	4
(New Zealand) Claudine Toleafoa	1	1
7	(China) Fang Li	6	6

Qualifying competition
(Australia) Clare Thompson	3	3
7	(China) Fang Li	6	6

=== Third qualifier ===
First round
4	(Croatia) Nadin Ercegović	5	7	3
(Australia) Jo-Anne Faull	7	5	6
(Japan) Akemi Nishiya	4	6	4
(Netherlands) Ingelise Driehuis	6	2	6
(United States) Caroline Kuhlman	4	6	17
(Australia) Tracey Morton-Rodgers	6	2	15
(Japan) Emiko Okagawa	2	6	0
11	(Finland) Nanne Dahlman	6	2	6

Second round
(Australia) Jo-Anne Faull	7^{9}	4	6
(Netherlands) Ingelise Driehuis	6^{7}	6	1
(United States) Caroline Kuhlman	2	1
11	(Finland) Nanne Dahlman	6	6

Qualifying competition
(Australia) Jo-Anne Faull	6	3	2
11	(Finland) Nanne Dahlman	3	6	6

=== Fourth qualifier ===
First round
15	(United States) Andrea Leand	4	6	6
(United States) Terri O'Reilly	6	2	2
WC	(Australia) Danielle Jones	4	1
(Slovenia) Tina Križan	6	6
(Australia) Catherine Barclay	3	3
(Mexico) Angélica Gavaldón	6	6
(Japan) Kyōko Nagatsuka	7^{7}	6
5	(United States) Ann Henricksson	6^{3}	4

Second round
15	(United States) Andrea Leand	7^{7}	6^{1}	4
(Slovenia) Tina Križan	6^{5}	7^{7}	6
(Mexico) Angélica Gavaldón	2	6	6
(Japan) Kyōko Nagatsuka	6	2	3

Qualifying competition
(Slovenia) Tina Križan	1	2
(Mexico) Angélica Gavaldón	6	6

=== Fifth qualifier ===
First round
8	(Netherlands) Stephanie Rottier	5	7^{7}	6
(New Zealand) Hana Guy	7	6^{4}	0
WC	(Australia) Robyn Mawdsley	1	2
(Mexico) Lupita Novelo	6	6
(Japan) Yone Kamio	1	6	6
(United Kingdom) Belinda Borneo	6	4	2
WC	(Australia) Justine Hodder	6^{5}	0
13	(Japan) Tamaka Takagi	7^{7}	6

Second round
8	(Netherlands) Stephanie Rottier	6	6
(Mexico) Lupita Novelo	1	3
(Japan) Yone Kamio	7^{7}	6
13	(Japan) Tamaka Takagi	6^{4}	2

Qualifying competition
8	(Netherlands) Stephanie Rottier	w/o
(Japan) Yone Kamio

=== Sixth qualifier ===
First round
16	(United Kingdom) Sarah Loosemore	6	6
(Japan) Miki Yokobori	3	2
(Germany) Eva Pfaff	1	5
(France) Nathalie Housset	6	7
WC	(Australia) Maria Purcell	2	1
(United States) Akiko Gooden	6	6
(Canada) Maureen Drake	6	7
3	(Japan) Misumi Miyauchi	4	5

Second round
16	(United Kingdom) Sarah Loosemore	4	2
(France) Nathalie Housset	6	6
(United States) Akiko Gooden	1	3
(Canada) Maureen Drake	6	6

Qualifying competition
(France) Nathalie Housset	5	7^{7}	6
(Canada) Maureen Drake	7	6^{5}	2

=== Seventh qualifier ===
First round
6	(United States) Jessica Emmons	6	6
(Netherlands) Monique Kiene	3	1
(Australia) Angie Woolcock	7^{9}	3	6
(United States) Laura Glitz	6^{7}	6	3
(United States) Camille Benjamin	3	6	6
(Poland) Magdalena Feistel	6	3	2
(Belgium) Ann Devries	6	3	7
12	(Australia) Kristine Kunce	3	6	5

Second round
6	(United States) Jessica Emmons	7^{9}	5	6
(Australia) Angie Woolcock	6^{7}	7	3
(United States) Camille Benjamin	3	6^{4}
(Belgium) Ann Devries	6	7^{7}

Qualifying competition
6	(United States) Jessica Emmons	6	6
(Belgium) Ann Devries	4	3

=== Eighth qualifier ===
First round
10	(United States) Stacey Martin	4	3
(Japan) Ayako Hirose	6	6
(United States) Nicole Arendt	6	6
(Netherlands) Kristie Boogert	4	4
WC	(Australia) Maija Avotins	5	5
(Australia) Jane Taylor	7	7
(Australia) Louise Pleming	0	0
2	(Netherlands) Miriam Oremans	6	6

Second round
(Japan) Ayako Hirose	2	2
(United States) Nicole Arendt	6	6
(Australia) Jane Taylor	6	6
2	(Netherlands) Miriam Oremans	4	1

Qualifying competition
(United States) Nicole Arendt	6	6
(Australia) Jane Taylor	4	3
