= 1990 US Open – Women's singles qualifying =

Women's singles qualifying
- 1990 US Open

Events
Singles	men	women		boys	girls
Doubles	men	women	mixed	boys	girls
WC Singles	men	women	quad
WC Doubles	men	women	quad
Legends	men	women	mixed

Qualification
Singles	men	women
- US Open

Players who neither had high enough rankings nor received wild cards to enter the main draw of the annual US Open Tennis Championships participated in a qualifying tournament held over several days before the event.

== Seeds ==
1. -
2. (Brazil) Cláudia Chabalgoity (first round)
3. (Japan) Akiko Kijimuta (qualifying competition, lucky loser)
4. (United Kingdom) Sara Gomer (second round)
5. (New Zealand) Claudine Toleafoa (second round)
6. (Canada) Rene Simpson (qualifying competition)
7. (France) Mary Pierce (qualifying competition)
8. (Poland) Renata Baranski (qualified)
9. (West Germany) Eva Pfaff (first round)
10. (New Zealand) Julie Richardson (first round)
11. (France) Pascale Etchemendy (first round)
12. (United Kingdom) Samantha Smith (second round)
13. (Soviet Union) Elena Brioukhovets (second round)
14. (Australia) Kristin Godridge (qualifying competition)
15. (Brazil) Andrea Vieira (second round)
16. (Luxembourg) Karin Kschwendt (qualified)
17. (Peru) Pilar Vásquez (first round)

== Qualifiers ==
1. (Luxembourg) Karin Kschwendt
2. (Poland) Renata Baranski
3. (United Kingdom) Clare Wood
4. (Netherlands) Miriam Oremans
5. (United States) Andrea Farley
6. (United States) Eleni Rossides
7. (United States) Sandy Collins
8. (Canada) Maureen Drake

== Lucky losers ==
1. (Japan) Akiko Kijimuta

== Qualifying draw ==
Key

- Q = Qualifier
- WC = Wild card
- LL = Lucky loser
- Alt = Alternate
- ITF = ITF entry
- PR = Protected ranking
- SR = Special ranking
- SE = Special exempt
- JE = Junior exempt
- JR = Junior Accelerator Programme entrant
- CO = College Accelerator Programme entrant
- NG = Next Gen Accelerator Program entrant
- w/o = Walkover
- r = Retired
- d = Defaulted

=== First qualifier ===
First round
17	(Peru) Pilar Vásquez	6^{4}	1
(Australia) Kirrily Sharpe	7^{7}	6
(France) Sybille Niox-Château	6	4	3
(South Africa) Lise Gregory	1	6	6
(United States) Heather Ludloff	2	5
(France) Noëlle van Lottum	6	7
(United States) Amy Schwartz	0	1
16	(Luxembourg) Karin Kschwendt	6	6

Second round
(Australia) Kirrily Sharpe	6	6^{5}	6
(South Africa) Lise Gregory	4	7^{7}	3
(France) Noëlle van Lottum	3	2
16	(Luxembourg) Karin Kschwendt	6	6

Qualifying competition
(Australia) Kirrily Sharpe	2	2
16	(Luxembourg) Karin Kschwendt	6	6

=== Second qualifier ===
First round
10	(New Zealand) Julie Richardson	6^{4}	4
(France) Sophie Amiach	7^{7}	6
(Japan) Ei Iida	4	3
(Netherlands) Hellas ter Riet	6	6
(Australia) Tracey Morton-Rodgers	3	5
(United States) Kate Gompert	6	7
(United States) Louise Allen	3	6	3
8	(Poland) Renata Baranski	6	1	6

Second round
(France) Sophie Amiach	6	6
(Netherlands) Hellas ter Riet	2	2
(United States) Kate Gompert	7	6^{4}	4
8	(Poland) Renata Baranski	5	7^{7}	6

Qualifying competition
(France) Sophie Amiach	4	4
8	(Poland) Renata Baranski	6	6

=== Third qualifier ===
First round
3	(Japan) Akiko Kijimuta	7^{7}	7
Alt	(Sweden) Maria Lindström	6^{5}	5
WC	(United States) Julie Shiflet	4	4
(France) Catherine Suire	6	6
(West Germany) Anouschka Popp	1	2
(United States) Luanne Spadea	6	6
(United Kingdom) Clare Wood	6	7^{7}
11	(France) Pascale Etchemendy	1	6^{4}

Second round
3	(Japan) Akiko Kijimuta	6	6
(France) Catherine Suire	3	2
(United States) Luanne Spadea	6	1	2
(United Kingdom) Clare Wood	1	6	6

Qualifying competition
3	(Japan) Akiko Kijimuta	1	6	0
(United Kingdom) Clare Wood	6	3	6

=== Fourth qualifier ===
First round
13	(Soviet Union) Elena Brioukhovets	6	6
(Czechoslovakia) Andrea Strnadová	1	3
(Netherlands) Miriam Oremans	6	6
(France) Maïder Laval	4	1
WC	(United States) Beth Herr	2^{r}
(United States) Shawn Foltz	5
(United States) Erika deLone	4	6	0
6	(Canada) Rene Simpson	6	3	6

Second round
13	(Soviet Union) Elena Brioukhovets	6	1	3
(Netherlands) Miriam Oremans	1	6	6
(United States) Shawn Foltz	2	2
6	(Canada) Rene Simpson	6	6

Qualifying competition
(Netherlands) Miriam Oremans	6	1	6
6	(Canada) Rene Simpson	4	6	3

=== Fifth qualifier ===
First round
7	(France) Mary Pierce	6	6
WC	(United States) Shannan McCarthy	3	1
(Brazil) Luciana Corsato-Owsianka	3	4
(France) Pascale Paradis	6	6
WC	(United States) Susan Gilchrist	6	6
(Japan) Tamaka Takagi	3	4
(United States) Andrea Farley	2	6	6
9	(West Germany) Eva Pfaff	6	1	3

Second round
7	(France) Mary Pierce	7^{7}	6
(France) Pascale Paradis	6^{5}	2
WC	(United States) Susan Gilchrist	1	7	2
(United States) Andrea Farley	6	5	6

Qualifying competition
7	(France) Mary Pierce	1	6	4
(United States) Andrea Farley	6	3	6

=== Sixth qualifier ===
First round
12	(United Kingdom) Samantha Smith	3	6	7^{7}
(United States) Stacey Schefflin	6	2	6^{1}
WC	(United States) Nicole Hummel	7^{7}	2	3
WC	(United States) Rachel Jensen	6^{5}	6	6
(Japan) Kumiko Okamoto	7^{9}	3	2
(United States) Eleni Rossides	6^{7}	6	6
(Czechoslovakia) Iva Budařová	3	3
4	(United Kingdom) Sara Gomer	6	6

Second round
12	(United Kingdom) Samantha Smith	4	6^{5}
WC	(United States) Rachel Jensen	6	7^{7}
(United States) Eleni Rossides	6	4	6
4	(United Kingdom) Sara Gomer	0	6	2

Qualifying competition
WC	(United States) Rachel Jensen	1	0
(United States) Eleni Rossides	6	6

=== Seventh qualifier ===
First round
5	(New Zealand) Claudine Toleafoa	6	6
(West Germany) Marketa Kochta	3	2
(United States) Sandy Collins	7	6
(South Africa) Robyn Field	5	2
(Australia) Jo-Anne Faull	3	3
WC	(United States) Sandra Birch	6	6
(Hungary) Réka Szikszay	2	0
14	(Australia) Kristin Godridge	6	6

Second round
5	(New Zealand) Claudine Toleafoa	5	2
(United States) Sandy Collins	7	6
WC	(United States) Sandra Birch	4	3
14	(Australia) Kristin Godridge	6	6

Qualifying competition
(United States) Sandy Collins	6^{5}	6	6
14	(Australia) Kristin Godridge	7^{7}	3	4

=== Eighth qualifier ===
First round
15	(Brazil) Andrea Vieira	6	7
(Czechoslovakia) Leona Lásková	4	5
(Canada) Maureen Drake	7	6
(Japan) Akemi Nishiya	5	3
(France) Nathalie Guerrée-Spitzer	3	5
WC	(United States) Lisa Bonder	6	7
(United States) Akiko Gooden	6	4	6
2	(Brazil) Cláudia Chabalgoity	4	6	0

Second round
15	(Brazil) Andrea Vieira	2	2
(Canada) Maureen Drake	6	6
WC	(United States) Lisa Bonder	4	4
(United States) Akiko Gooden	6	6

Qualifying competition
(Canada) Maureen Drake	6	7
(United States) Akiko Gooden	0	5
