= Teri Whitlinger =

American tennis player

- Full name: Teri Whitlinger-Boynton
- Country (sports): United States
- Born: November 13, 1968 (age 56); Neenah, Wisconsin
- Prize money: $32,280

Singles
- Highest ranking: No. 183 (November 16, 1992)

Doubles
- Highest ranking: No. 197 (August 17, 1992)

Grand Slam doubles results
- US Open: 3R (1991)

Teri Whitlinger-Boynton (born November 13, 1968) is an American former professional tennis player.

== Biography ==
=== Family ===
Whitlinger grew up in Neenah, Wisconsin and comes from a family of sportspeople. Her grandfather, Warren, was a basketball player for Ohio State, before going to compete in the professional National Basketball League for Akron. Her father Kip was also an Ohio State basketball player, while her uncle John played tennis professionally. She has a twin sister, Tami, who also played on the WTA Tour.

She is married to tennis coach Craig Boynton.

=== Tennis career ===
A four-time All-American at Stanford, Whitlinger won the NCAA doubles championship in 1990, with Meredith McGrath. She finished her collegiate career with a Stanford record win-loss record of 101-6 in dual matches.

Partnering sister Tami, she made the second round of the women's doubles at the 1990 US Open and the third round at the 1991 US Open.
