= Akiko Gooden =

American tennis player

- Country (sports): United States
- Born: February 14, 1972 (age 54) Tokyo, Japan
- Prize money: $47,698

Singles
- Career titles: 1 ITF
- Highest ranking: No. 155 (August 20, 1990)

Doubles
- Career titles: 1 ITF
- Highest ranking: No. 119 (April 13, 1992)

Grand Slam doubles results
- Australian Open: 1R (1992)
- US Open: 1R (1991)

Akiko Gooden (born February 14, 1972) is an American former professional tennis player.

Born in Tokyo, Gooden was seven years of age when she moved to the United States and swam competitively as a child. Having settled on tennis, she became the nation's top ranked 12s and 14s player, before going on to play professionally.

Gooden, who reached a best singles ranking of 155, featured in the qualifying draws for the Australian Open, Wimbledon and US Open in 1990. As a doubles player she played in the main draws of the 1991 US Open and 1992 Australian Open.

== ITF finals ==
$25,000 tournaments
$10,000 tournaments

=== Singles: 2 (1–1) ===
Result	No.	Date	Tournament	Surface	Opponent	Score
Win	1.	June 19, 1989	Madeira, Portugal	Hard	(Japan) Emiko Sakaguchi	6–2, 7–5
Loss	1.	October 9, 1989	Nagasaki, Japan	Hard	(Japan) Naoko Sawamatsu	4–6, 0–6

=== Doubles: 1 (1–0) ===
Result	No.	Date	Tournament	Surface	Partner	Opponents	Score
Win	1.	October 5, 1992	Leawood, United States	Hard	(Australia) Nicole Arendt	(United States) Rachel Jensen (United States) Stephanie Reece	6–3, 6–1
