= 1991 French Open – Mixed doubles =

Mixed doubles
- 1991 French Open

Final
- Champion: (Czechoslovakia) Helena Suková (Czechoslovakia) Cyril Suk
- Runner-up: (Netherlands) Caroline Vis (Netherlands) Paul Haarhuis
- Score: 3–6, 6–4, 6–1

Details
- Draw: 48
- Seeds: 16

Events
Singles	men	women		boys	girls
Doubles	men	women	mixed	boys	girls
WC Singles	men	women	quad
WC Doubles	men	women	quad
Legends	−45	45+	women
- French Open

The mixed doubles tournament at the 1991 French Open was held from 27 May until 9 June 1991 on the outdoor clay courts at the Stade Roland Garros in Paris, France. Helena Suková and Cyril Suk won the title, defeating Caroline Vis and Paul Haarhuis in the final.

== Draw ==
Key

- Q = Qualifier
- WC = Wild card
- LL = Lucky loser
- Alt = Alternate
- ITF = ITF entry
- PR = Protected ranking
- SR = Special ranking
- SE = Special exempt
- JE = Junior exempt
- JR = Junior Accelerator Programme entrant
- CO = College Accelerator Programme entrant
- NG = Next Gen Accelerator Program entrant
- w/o = Walkover
- r = Retired
- d = Defaulted

=== Finals ===
Quarterfinals
(Argentina) Gustavo Luza (Hungary) Andrea Temesvári	6	5	6
WC	(France) Rodolphe Gilbert (France) Nathalie Housset	4	7	1
(Australia) David Macpherson (Australia) Tracey Morton	4	4
14	(Netherlands) Paul Haarhuis (Netherlands) Caroline Vis	6	6
8	(Australia) Mark Woodforde (United States) Kathy Jordan	6	4	3
12	(Czechoslovakia) Cyril Suk (Czechoslovakia) Helena Suková	4	6	6
6	(Mexico) Jorge Lozano (Spain) Arantxa Sánchez Vicario	7	6
13	(Belgium) Libor Pimek (Soviet Union) Larisa Savchenko	5	3

Semifinals
(Argentina) Gustavo Luza (Hungary) Andrea Temesvári	6	6	3
14	(Netherlands) Paul Haarhuis (Netherlands) Caroline Vis	2	7	6
12	(Czechoslovakia) Cyril Suk (Czechoslovakia) Helena Suková	1	6	9
6	(Mexico) Jorge Lozano (Spain) Arantxa Sánchez Vicario	6	2	7

Final
14	(Netherlands) Paul Haarhuis (Netherlands) Caroline Vis	6	4	1
12	(Czechoslovakia) Cyril Suk (Czechoslovakia) Helena Suková	3	6	6

=== Top half ===
==== Section 1 ====
First round
(Argentina) G Luza (Hungary) A Temesvári	6	6
(Brazil) C Motta (Brazil) C Chabalgoity	3	3
(Israel) G Bloom (Australia) R McQuillan	6	6
(United States) J Brown (United States) S Stafford	7	7
WC	(United States) J Grabb (United States) D Graham	4	5
WC	(France) R Gilbert (France) N Housset	6	7
(Australia) J Stoltenberg (Australia) R Stubbs	6	3	7
(United States) P Annacone (United States) S Rehe	1	6	9

Second round
1	(United States) P Galbraith (United States) P Fendick	2	5
(Argentina) G Luza (Hungary) A Temesvári	6	7
(United States) J Brown (United States) S Stafford	2	2
15	(United States) S Cannon (United States) K Adams	6	6
11	(United States) R Seguso (United States) E Burgin	3	4
WC	(France) R Gilbert (France) N Housset	6	6
(United States) P Annacone (United States) S Rehe	6	2	4
7	(South Africa) D Visser (South Africa) R Fairbank-Nideffer	2	6	6

Third round
(Argentina) G Luza (Hungary) A Temesvári	7	6	6
15	(United States) S Cannon (United States) K Adams	5	7	1
WC	(France) R Gilbert (France) N Housset	6	6
7	(South Africa) D Visser (South Africa) R Fairbank-Nideffer	4	3

Quarterfinals
(Argentina) G Luza (Hungary) A Temesvári	6	5	6
WC	(France) R Gilbert (France) N Housset	4	7	1

==== Section 2 ====
First round
(Argentina) J Frana (Argentina) M Paz	3	5
(Australia) D Macpherson (Australia) T Morton	6	7
(South Africa) P Norval (France) I Demongeot	6	6
(Netherlands) T Nijssen (Netherlands) M Bollegraf	4	2
(Sweden) R Bergh (Sweden) M Strandlund	7	4	6
(Australia) N Borwick (Australia) L Field	5	6	4
(France) É Winogradsky (France) C Suire	7	3	4
(Iran) M Bahrami (France) C Tanvier	6	6	6

Second round
Alt	(United States) J Rive (United States) S Collins	6	4	5
(Australia) D Macpherson (Australia) T Morton	4	6	7
(South Africa) P Norval (France) I Demongeot	6	6
9	(South Africa) S Kruger (South Africa) L Gregory	1	2
14	(Netherlands) P Haarhuis (Netherlands) C Vis	7	6
(Sweden) R Bergh (Sweden) M Strandlund	6	4
(Iran) M Bahrami (France) C Tanvier	6	6	2
Alt	(United States) B Garnett (Netherlands) C Bakkum	7	4	6

Third round
(Australia) D Macpherson (Australia) T Morton	7	6
(South Africa) P Norval (France) I Demongeot	6	4
14	(Netherlands) P Haarhuis (Netherlands) C Vis	6	6
Alt	(United States) B Garnett (Netherlands) C Bakkum	3	3

Quarterfinals
(Australia) D Macpherson (Australia) T Morton	4	4
14	(Netherlands) P Haarhuis (Netherlands) C Vis	6	6

=== Bottom half ===
==== Section 3 ====
First round
(South Africa) B Talbot (South Africa) E Reinach	7	6
(The Bahamas) R Smith (United States) L McNeil	6	2
WC	(France) S Soulié (France) N van Lottum	2	4
(Venezuela) N Pereira (Germany) E Pfaff	6	6
(United States) S Salumaa (Germany) C Schneider	6	6
(United States) S Patridge (Argentina) F Labat	2	3
(United States) K Kinnear (United States) C Benjamin	5	6	6
(Sweden) T Svantesson (United States) T Whitlinger	7	4	3

Second round
8	(Australia) M Woodforde (United States) K Jordan	6	6
(South Africa) B Talbot (South Africa) E Reinach	1	4
(Venezuela) N Pereira (Germany) E Pfaff	1	6
10	(Netherlands) M Koevermans (Netherlands) B Schultz	6	7
12	(Czechoslovakia) C Suk (Czechoslovakia) H Suková	6	6
(United States) S Salumaa (Germany) C Schneider	3	3
(United States) K Kinnear (United States) C Benjamin	6	6	4
3	(United States) R Leach (United States) Z Garrison	4	7	6

Third round
8	(Australia) M Woodforde (United States) K Jordan	6	6
10	(Netherlands) M Koevermans (Netherlands) B Schultz	2	3
12	(Czechoslovakia) C Suk (Czechoslovakia) H Suková	7	6
3	(United States) R Leach (United States) Z Garrison	5	2

Quarterfinals
8	(Australia) M Woodforde (United States) K Jordan	6	4	3
12	(Czechoslovakia) C Suk (Czechoslovakia) H Suková	4	6	6

==== Section 4 ====
First round
(Australia) L Warder (United Kingdom) C Wood	3	1
(United Kingdom) N Brown (United States) P Mager	6	6
(Uruguay) D Pérez (Germany) K Kschwendt	4	6	3
(Australia) B Dyke (Australia) M Jaggard	6	4	6
WC	(France) T Benhabiles (France) N Herreman	7	2	6
(Netherlands) M Schapers (Italy) L Golarsa	6	6	3
(Canada) G Michibata (United States) G Helgeson	6	6
(Czechoslovakia) D Vacek (Czechoslovakia) A Strnadová	3	0

Second round
6	(Mexico) J Lozano (Spain) A Sánchez Vicario	6	6
(United Kingdom) N Brown (United States) P Mager	2	3
(Australia) B Dyke (Australia) M Jaggard	5	6	5
16	(United States) K Flach (France) M Pierce	7	4	7
13	(Belgium) L Pimek (Soviet Union) L Savchenko	6	6
WC	(France) T Benhabiles (France) N Herreman	4	4
(Canada) G Michibata (United States) G Helgeson	7	6	2
2	(Australia) T Woodbridge (United States) M McGrath	5	7	6

Third round
6	(Mexico) J Lozano (Spain) A Sánchez Vicario	6	6
16	(United States) K Flach (France) M Pierce	4	3
13	(Belgium) L Pimek (Soviet Union) L Savchenko	7	7
2	(Australia) T Woodbridge (United States) M McGrath	5	5

Quarterfinals
6	(Mexico) J Lozano (Spain) A Sánchez Vicario	7	6
13	(Belgium) L Pimek (Soviet Union) L Savchenko	5	3
