= Julie Shiflet =

American tennis player

- Country (sports): United States
- Born: October 7, 1972 (age 52)
- Prize money: $51,493

Singles
- Career record: 79–107
- Career titles: 1 ITF
- Highest ranking: No. 212 (February 22, 1993)

Grand Slam singles results
- US Open: Q1 (1990)

Doubles
- Career record: 3–20
- Highest ranking: No. 524 (October 15, 1990)

Julie Shiflet (born October 7, 1972) is an American former professional tennis player.

A native of Virginia Beach, Shiflet grew up in a tennis involved family, which owned the Virginia Beach Tennis and Country Club. She played collegiate tennis for William & Mary and was a singles All-American in 1992, as a freshman.

Shiflet, who reached a career high singles ranking of 212 in the world, featured in the qualifying draw for the 1990 US Open. Her best performance on the WTA Tour came at the 1991 Colorado Tennis Classic, where she had a first round win over Heather Ludloff, then took the eventual champion Lori McNeil to three sets in the round of 16.

== ITF finals ==
=== Singles: 1 (1–0) ===
Outcome	Date	Tournament	Surface	Opponent	Score
Winner	August 5, 1990	Roanoke, United States	Hard	(United States) Lisa Albano	6–1, 6–2
