= Anouschka Popp =

German tennis player

- Country (sports): West Germany; Germany
- Born: 19 July 1972 (age 52)
- Prize money: $31,331

Singles
- Career titles: 1 ITF
- Highest ranking: No. 164 (20 May 1991)

Grand Slam singles results
- French Open: Q2 (1991)
- US Open: Q1 (1990, 1991)

Doubles
- Career titles: 1 ITF
- Highest ranking: No. 228 (25 June 1990)

Anouschka Popp (born 19 July 1972) is a German former professional tennis player.

Popp, who grew up around Frankfurt, reached a best singles ranking of 164 competing on the professional tour. She won a $25k title in Erlangen in 1990 and the following year featured in the main draw of two WTA Tour tournaments, the Croatian Bol Ladies Open and German Open.

Finishing up on tour in 1992, Popp went on to play college tennis for the University of Florida in 1994.

== ITF finals ==
$25,000 tournaments
$10,000 tournaments

=== Singles (1–0) ===
Result	No.	Date	Tournament	Surface	Opponent	Score
Win	1.	9 July 1990	ITF Erlangen, West Germany	Clay	(Soviet Union) Agnese Gustmane	7–5, 3–6, 7–6

=== Doubles (1–2) ===
Result	No.	Date	Tournament	Surface	Partner	Opponents	Score
Loss	1.	21 November 1988	ITF Pforzheim, West Germany	Carpet (i)	(Hungary) Andrea Noszály	(West Germany) Vera-Carina Elter (West Germany) Eva-Maria Schürhoff	4–6, 5–7
Win	1.	3 July 1989	ITF Stuttgart, West Germany	Clay	(Hungary) Réka Szikszay	(Brazil) Luciana Tella (Argentina) Andrea Tiezzi	7–5, 6–4
Loss	2.	20 July 1992	ITF Darmstadt, Germany	Clay	(Germany) Sandra Wächtershäuser	(Slovenia) Tina Križan (United States) Nicole Arendt	2–6, 1–6
