= 1991 US Open – Women's doubles =

Women's doubles
- 1991 US Open

Final
- Champions: (United States) Pam Shriver (Soviet Union) Natasha Zvereva
- Runners-up: (Czechoslovakia) Jana Novotná (Soviet Union) Larisa Savchenko
- Score: 6–4, 4–6, 7–6^{(7–5)}

Details
- Draw: 64
- Seeds: 16

Events
Singles	men	women		boys	girls
Doubles	men	women	mixed	boys	girls
WC Singles	men	women	quad
WC Doubles	men	women	quad
Legends	men	women	mixed
- US Open

Gigi Fernández and Martina Navratilova were the defending champions but lost in the third round to Katrina Adams and Manon Bollegraf.

Pam Shriver and Natasha Zvereva won in the final 6–4, 4–6, 7–6^{(7–5)} against Jana Novotná and Larisa Savchenko.

This was Novotná’s 8th consecutive grand slam doubles final, making all four finals in 1990 and 1991.

== Seeds ==
Champion seeds are indicated in bold text while text in italics indicates the round in which those seeds were eliminated.

1. (Czechoslovakia) Jana Novotná / (Soviet Union) Larisa Savchenko (final)
2. (United States) Gigi Fernández / (United States) Martina Navratilova (third round)
3. (Spain) Arantxa Sánchez Vicario / (Czechoslovakia) Helena Suková (third round)
4. (United States) Mary Joe Fernández / (United States) Zina Garrison (semifinals)
5. (United States) Gretchen Magers / (United States) Robin White (second round)
6. (United States) **Pam Shriver** / (Soviet Union) **Natasha Zvereva (champions)**
7. (Australia) Nicole Provis / (Australia) Elizabeth Smylie (second round)
8. (South Africa) Elna Reinach / (United States) Anne Smith (third round)
9. (Canada) Jill Hetherington / (United States) Kathy Rinaldi (first round)
10. (United States) Katrina Adams / (Netherlands) Manon Bollegraf (quarterfinals)
11. (United States) Patty Fendick / (United States) Lori McNeil (third round)
12. (United States) Mary Lou Daniels / (South Africa) Lise Gregory (third round)
13. (Soviet Union) Leila Meskhi / (Argentina) Mercedes Paz (semifinals)
14. (South Africa) Rosalyn Fairbank-Nideffer / (Germany) Claudia Kohde-Kilsch (quarterfinals)
15. (France) Nathalie Tauziat / (Austria) Judith Wiesner (third round)
16. (United States) Sandy Collins / (Australia) Rachel McQuillan (quarterfinals)

== Draw ==
Key

- Q = Qualifier
- WC = Wild card
- LL = Lucky loser
- Alt = Alternate
- ITF = ITF entry
- PR = Protected ranking
- SR = Special ranking
- SE = Special exempt
- JE = Junior exempt
- JR = Junior Accelerator Programme entrant
- CO = College Accelerator Programme entrant
- NG = Next Gen Accelerator Program entrant
- w/o = Walkover
- r = Retired
- d = Defaulted

=== Finals ===
Semifinals
1	(Czechoslovakia) Jana Novotná (Soviet Union) Larisa Savchenko	6	6
4	(United States) Mary Joe Fernández (United States) Zina Garrison	4	2
13	(Soviet Union) Leila Meskhi (Argentina) Mercedes Paz	1	0
6	(United States) Pam Shriver (Soviet Union) Natasha Zvereva	6	6

Final
1	(Czechoslovakia) Jana Novotná (Soviet Union) Larisa Savchenko	4	6	6^{5}
6	(United States) Pam Shriver (Soviet Union) Natasha Zvereva	6	4	7^{7}

=== Top half ===
==== Section 1 ====
First round
1	(Czechoslovakia) J Novotná (Soviet Union) L Savchenko	0	7^{7}	6
(Argentina) B Fulco (Netherlands) N Jagerman	6	6^{4}	4
(United States) S Stafford (United States) M Werdel	6	6
(France) A Dechaume (Argentina) F Labat	1	3
(France) J Halard (Germany) A Huber	6^{3}	2
(United States) D Graham (United States) S McCarthy	7^{7}	6
(Italy) S Farina (Italy) L Garrone	3	1
12	(United States) M L Daniels (South Africa) L Gregory	6	6
16	(United States) S Collins (Australia) R McQuillan	6	6
(New Zealand) B Cordwell (Sweden) C Lindqvist	4	3
(Italy) L Ferrando (Germany) W Probst	6	6
(Sweden) M Lindström (France) C Suire	1	2
(United States) Ta Whitlinger (United States) Te Whitlinger	7^{7}	7
(United States) G Helgeson (Canada) R Simpson-Alter	6^{5}	5
(United States) E Burgin (Hungary) A Temesvári	1	3
5	(United States) G Magers (United States) R White	6	6

Second round
1	(Czechoslovakia) J Novotná (Soviet Union) L Savchenko	6	6^{10}	6
(United States) S Stafford (United States) M Werdel	4	7^{12}	1
(United States) D Graham (United States) S McCarthy	2	3
12	(United States) M L Daniels (South Africa) L Gregory	6	6
16	(United States) S Collins (Australia) R McQuillan	6	7
(Italy) L Ferrando (Germany) W Probst	2	5
(United States) Ta Whitlinger (United States) Te Whitlinger	6	4	6
5	(United States) G Magers (United States) R White	3	6	3

Third round
1	(Czechoslovakia) J Novotná (Soviet Union) L Savchenko	6	6
12	(United States) M L Daniels (South Africa) L Gregory	4	2
16	(United States) S Collins (Australia) R McQuillan	6	3	6
(United States) Ta Whitlinger (United States) Te Whitlinger	1	6	0

Quarterfinals
1	(Czechoslovakia) J Novotná (Soviet Union) L Savchenko	3	6	6
16	(United States) S Collins (Australia) R McQuillan	6	2	4

==== Section 2 ====
First round
4	(United States) M J Fernández (United States) Z Garrison	6	6
(Japan) N Miyagi (United States) B Somerville	2	0
(Czechoslovakia) P Langrová (Czechoslovakia) R Zrubáková	6^{2}	4
(Australia) K Godridge (Australia) K Radford	7^{7}	6
(United States) P Louie-Harper (United States) A May	2	5
(Australia) J-A Faull (Australia) M Jaggard	6	7
(Belgium) S Appelmans (United States) C Benjamin	6	7
9	(Canada) J Hetherington (United States) K Rinaldi	4	5
14	(South Africa) R Fairbank-Nideffer (Germany) C Kohde-Kilsch	7	6
(Soviet Union) E Brioukhovets (Bulgaria) K Maleeva	5	3
(France) M Pierce (United States) L Spadea	4	1
(Australia) T Morton (United Kingdom) C Wood	6	6
(United States) P Barg-Mager (United States) C MacGregor	7^{7}	3	5
(United States) A Frazier (Japan) M Kidowaki	6^{5}	6	7
(Soviet Union) E Maniokova (Finland) P Thorén	7	4	5
8	(South Africa) E Reinach (United States) A Smith	5	6	7

Second round
4	(United States) M J Fernández (United States) Z Garrison	6	6
(Australia) K Godridge (Australia) K Radford	3	0
(Australia) J-A Faull (Australia) M Jaggard	4	2
(Belgium) S Appelmans (United States) C Benjamin	6	6
14	(South Africa) R Fairbank-Nideffer (Germany) C Kohde-Kilsch	6	6
(Australia) T Morton (United Kingdom) C Wood	4	2
(United States) A Frazier (Japan) M Kidowaki	4	3
8	(South Africa) E Reinach (United States) A Smith	6	6

Third round
4	(United States) M J Fernández (United States) Z Garrison	4	7	6
(Belgium) S Appelmans (United States) C Benjamin	6	5	4
14	(South Africa) R Fairbank-Nideffer (Germany) C Kohde-Kilsch	6	7^{7}
8	(South Africa) E Reinach (United States) A Smith	4	6^{5}

Quarterfinals
4	(United States) M J Fernández (United States) Z Garrison	7	4	6
14	(South Africa) R Fairbank-Nideffer (Germany) C Kohde-Kilsch	5	6	3

=== Bottom half ===
==== Section 3 ====
First round
7	(Australia) N Provis (Australia) E Smylie	6	6
(United States) R Baranski (United Kingdom) B Borneo	3	1
(Netherlands) G Coorengel (Netherlands) A van Buuren	2	1
(Indonesia) Y Basuki (United Kingdom) J Durie	6	6
(Bulgaria) M Maleeva (Switzerland) M Maleeva-Fragnière	5	4
(Australia) K-A Guse (Japan) A Nishiya	7	6
(Belgium) A Devries (Belgium) S Wasserman	1	3
15	(France) N Tauziat (Austria) J Wiesner	6	6
13	(Soviet Union) L Meskhi (Argentina) M Paz	6	3	6
(United States) C Cunningham (Peru) L Gildemeister	4	6	4
(Australia) L Field (Sweden) M Strandlund	6	1	2
(Canada) H Kelesi (Netherlands) C Vis	1	6	6
(France) I Demongeot (Spain) C Martínez	6	6
(United States) A Grossman (Australia) R Stubbs	1	3
(Japan) K Date (Japan) A Kijimuta	2	2
3	(Spain) A Sánchez Vicario (Czechoslovakia) H Suková	6	6

Second round
7	(Australia) N Provis (Australia) E Smylie	3	3
(Indonesia) Y Basuki (United Kingdom) J Durie	6	6
(Australia) K-A Guse (Japan) A Nishiya	1	3
15	(France) N Tauziat (Austria) J Wiesner	6	6
13	(Soviet Union) L Meskhi (Argentina) M Paz	6	7^{7}
(Canada) H Kelesi (Netherlands) C Vis	1	6^{4}
(France) I Demongeot (Spain) C Martínez	4	1
3	(Spain) A Sánchez Vicario (Czechoslovakia) H Suková	6	6

Third round
(Indonesia) Y Basuki (United Kingdom) J Durie	6	3	6
15	(France) N Tauziat (Austria) J Wiesner	2	6	1
13	(Soviet Union) L Meskhi (Argentina) M Paz	7^{8}	6
3	(Spain) A Sánchez Vicario (Czechoslovakia) H Suková	6^{6}	4

Quarterfinals
(Indonesia) Y Basuki (United Kingdom) J Durie	3	4
13	(Soviet Union) L Meskhi (Argentina) M Paz	6	6

==== Section 4 ====
First round
6	(United States) P Shriver (Soviet Union) N Zvereva	6	6
(United States) A Henricksson (United States) J Smoller	2	2
(Luxembourg) K Kschwendt (Netherlands) B Schultz	7^{7}	6
(Italy) S Cecchini (Argentina) P Tarabini	6^{4}	1
(Canada) J Alexander (United States) N Arendt	2	7^{14}	4
(Switzerland) C Caverzasio (France) N Herreman	6	6^{12}	6
(United States) A Gooden (Japan) R Hiraki	1	2
11	(United States) P Fendick (United States) L McNeil	6	6
10	(United States) K Adams (Netherlands) M Bollegraf	6	6
(Czechoslovakia) I Jankovská (Czechoslovakia) E Melicharová	1	4
(France) P Paradis (France) S Testud	6	6
(Czechoslovakia) A Noháčová (Czechoslovakia) E Švíglerová	4	2
(Germany) E Pfaff (Germany) C Porwik	6	6^{3}	6
(United States) L Davenport (United States) N London	4	7^{7}	1
(Czechoslovakia) R Rajchrtová (Czechoslovakia) A Strnadová	2	4
2	(United States) G Fernández (United States) M Navratilova	6	6

Second round
6	(United States) P Shriver (Soviet Union) N Zvereva	4	6	7^{7}
(Luxembourg) K Kschwendt (Netherlands) B Schultz	6	2	6^{5}
(Switzerland) C Caverzasio (France) N Herreman	2	3
11	(United States) P Fendick (United States) L McNeil	6	6
10	(United States) K Adams (Netherlands) M Bollegraf	6	6
(France) P Paradis (France) S Testud	3	3
(Germany) E Pfaff (Germany) C Porwik	1	4
2	(United States) G Fernández (United States) M Navratilova	6	6

Third round
6	(United States) P Shriver (Soviet Union) N Zvereva	6	7
11	(United States) P Fendick (United States) L McNeil	4	5
10	(United States) K Adams (Netherlands) M Bollegraf	7^{7}	6
2	(United States) G Fernández (United States) M Navratilova	6^{3}	1

Quarterfinals
6	(United States) P Shriver (Soviet Union) N Zvereva	6	6
10	(United States) K Adams (Netherlands) M Bollegraf	4	3
