= 1991 US Open – Mixed doubles =

Mixed doubles
- 1991 US Open

Final
- Champions: (Netherlands) Manon Bollegraf (Netherlands) Tom Nijssen
- Runners-up: (Spain) Arantxa Sánchez Vicario (Spain) Emilio Sánchez
- Score: 6–2, 7–6^{(7–2)}

Details
- Draw: 32
- Seeds: 8

Events
Singles	men	women		boys	girls
Doubles	men	women	mixed	boys	girls
WC Singles	men	women	quad
WC Doubles	men	women	quad
Legends	men	women	mixed
- US Open

Elizabeth Smylie and Todd Woodbridge were the defending champions but they competed with different partners that year, Smylie with John Fitzgerald and Woodbridge with Nicole Provis.

Smylie and Fitzgerald lost in the second round to Elna Reinach and Christo van Rensburg.

Provis and Woodbridge lost in the quarterfinals to Manon Bollegraf and Tom Nijssen.

Bollegraf and Nijssen won in the final 6–2, 7–6^{(7–2)} against Arantxa Sánchez Vicario and Emilio Sánchez.

== Seeds ==
Champion seeds are indicated in bold text while text in italics indicates the round in which those seeds were eliminated.

1. (Australia) Elizabeth Smylie / (Australia) John Fitzgerald (second round)
2. (Spain) Arantxa Sánchez Vicario / (Spain) Emilio Sánchez (final)
3. (Canada) Jill Hetherington / (Canada) Glenn Michibata (quarterfinals)
4. (Soviet Union) Natasha Zvereva / (United States) Jim Pugh (first round)
5. (United States) Robin White / (South Africa) Danie Visser (quarterfinals)
6. (United States) Patty Fendick / (Australia) Mark Woodforde (second round)
7. (United States) Gretchen Magers / (United States) Todd Witsken (second round)
8. (Australia) Nicole Provis / (Australia) Todd Woodbridge (quarterfinals)

== Draw ==
Key

- Q = Qualifier
- WC = Wild card
- LL = Lucky loser
- Alt = Alternate
- ITF = ITF entry
- PR = Protected ranking
- SR = Special ranking
- SE = Special exempt
- JE = Junior exempt
- JR = Junior Accelerator Programme entrant
- CO = College Accelerator Programme entrant
- NG = Next Gen Accelerator Program entrant
- w/o = Walkover
- r = Retired
- d = Defaulted

=== Final ===
Final
	(Netherlands) **Manon Bollegraf** (Netherlands) **Tom Nijssen**	**6**	**7^{7}**
2	(Spain) Arantxa Sánchez Vicario (Spain) Emilio Sánchez	2	6^{2}

=== Top half ===
First round
1	(Australia) **E Smylie** (Australia) **J Fitzgerald**	**6**	**7^{7}**
(United States) Z Garrison (United States) R Leach	4	6^{3}
(United States) A May (United States) P Galbraith	3	**7**	2
(South Africa) **E Reinach** (South Africa) **C van Rensburg**	**6**	5	**6**
(United States) **K Adams** (United States) **S Cannon**	**7^{7}**	4	**7^{7}**
(United States) L McNeil (United States) B Shelton	6^{3}	**6**	6^{5}
(United States) R Jensen (United States) L Jensen	3	4
6	(United States) **P Fendick** (Australia) **M Woodforde**	**6**	**6**
4	(Soviet Union) N Zvereva (United States) J Pugh	1	4
(Czechoslovakia) **H Suková** (Czechoslovakia) **C Suk**	**6**	**6**
(South Africa) L Gregory (United States) K Kinnear	4	2
(Netherlands) **M Bollegraf** (Netherlands) **T Nijssen**	**6**	**6**
(United States) M L Daniels (Belgium) L Pimek	5	**7**	3
(Soviet Union) **L Savchenko** (United States) **S Salumaa**	**7**	5	**6**
(United States) P Shriver (Australia) M Kratzmann	**6**	2	3
8	(Australia) **N Provis** (Australia) **T Woodbridge**	3	**6**	**6**

Second round
1	(Australia) E Smylie (Australia) J Fitzgerald	**6**	2	5
(South Africa) **E Reinach** (South Africa) **C van Rensburg**	2	**6**	**7**
(United States) **K Adams** (United States) **S Cannon**	**7^{7}**	2	**6**
6	(United States) P Fendick (Australia) M Woodforde	6^{4}	**6**	3
(Czechoslovakia) H Suková (Czechoslovakia) C Suk	6^{4}	**6**	3
(Netherlands) **M Bollegraf** (Netherlands) **T Nijssen**	**7^{7}**	4	**6**
(Soviet Union) L Savchenko (United States) S Salumaa	4	3
8	(Australia) **N Provis** (Australia) **T Woodbridge**	**6**	**6**

Quarterfinals
(South Africa) **E Reinach** (South Africa) **C van Rensburg**	3	**6**	**6**
(United States) K Adams (United States) S Cannon	**6**	3	3
(Netherlands) **M Bollegraf** (Netherlands) **T Nijssen**	**7^{7}**	**6**
8	(Australia) N Provis (Australia) T Woodbridge	6^{4}	3

Semifinals
(South Africa) E Reinach (South Africa) C van Rensburg	**6**	6^{6}	4
(Netherlands) **M Bollegraf** (Netherlands) **T Nijssen**	4	**7^{8}**	**6**

=== Bottom half ===
First round
7	(United States) **G Magers** (United States) **T Witsken**	**6**	**6**
(Australia) J-A Faull (South Africa) P Norval	3	4
(United States) A Smith (United States) K Jones	3	6^{5}
(United Kingdom) **J Durie** (Australia) **L Warder**	**6**	**7^{7}**
(United States) **R Fairbank-Nideffer** (United States) **S Melville**	**6**	**6**
(United States) D Graham (United States) J Palmer	3	3
(United States) A Frazier (The Bahamas) R Smith	**7^{7}**	1	5
3	(Canada) **J Hetherington** (Canada) **G Michibata**	6^{3}	**6**	**7**
5	(United States) **R White** (South Africa) **D Visser**	**6**	3	**6**
(United States) E Burgin (Sweden) R Bergh	3	**6**	4
(Netherlands) B Schultz (Netherlands) M Schapers	3	4
(Argentina) **M Paz** (Mexico) **L Lavalle**	**6**	**6**
(West Germany) **E Pfaff** (United Kingdom) **N Brown**	**6**	**6**
(France) M Pierce (Mexico) J Lozano	0	4
(Australia) R McQuillan (Australia) D Macpherson	4	6^{4}
2	(Spain) **A Sánchez Vicario** (Spain) **E Sánchez**	**6**	**7^{7}**

Second round
7	(United States) G Magers (United States) T Witsken	2	0
(United Kingdom) **J Durie** (Australia) **L Warder**	**6**	**6**
(United States) R Fairbank-Nideffer (United States) S Melville	4	4
3	(Canada) **J Hetherington** (Canada) **G Michibata**	**6**	**6**
5	(United States) **R White** (South Africa) **D Visser**	4	**7^{7}**	**6**
(Argentina) M Paz (Mexico) L Lavalle	**6**	6^{5}	4
(West Germany) E Pfaff (United Kingdom) N Brown	0	5
2	(Spain) **A Sánchez Vicario** (Spain) **E Sánchez**	**6**	**7**

Quarterfinals
(United Kingdom) **J Durie** (Australia) **L Warder**	**7^{7}**	**7^{7}**
3	(Canada) J Hetherington (Canada) G Michibata	6^{4}	6^{4}
5	(United States) R White (South Africa) D Visser	4	5
2	(Spain) **A Sánchez Vicario** (Spain) **E Sánchez**	**6**	**7**

Semifinals
(United Kingdom) J Durie (Australia) L Warder	2	2
2	(Spain) **A Sánchez Vicario** (Spain) **E Sánchez**	**6**	**6**
