= Nathalie Housset Gilbert =

French tennis player

Nathalie Housset
- Full name: Nathalie Housset Gilbert
- Country (sports): France
- Born: 29 July 1968 (age 56)
- Plays: Right-handed
- Prize money: $63,610

Singles
- Career record: 70–84
- Career titles: 1 ITF
- Highest ranking: No. 158 (30 September 1991)

Grand Slam singles results
- Australian Open: 2R (1992)
- French Open: 2R (1992)
- US Open: Q1 (1991, 1992)

Doubles
- Career record: 8–17
- Highest ranking: No. 380 (7 December 1987)

Grand Slam doubles results
- French Open: 2R (1991)

Grand Slam mixed doubles results
- French Open: QF (1991)

Nathalie Housset Gilbert (born 29 July 1968) is a French former professional tennis player.

A right-handed player, Housset had a career best singles ranking of 158 in the world. She won a $25,000 ITF tournament in Le Havre in 1990, beating countrywoman Nathalie Herreman in the final.

Housset reached the second round of both the Australian Open and French Open in 1992. At the French Open, after winning her first round match over Wang Shi-ting 9–7 in the third set, she was beaten in the second round by eventual finalist Steffi Graf. Her best grand slam performance came in the mixed doubles at the 1991 French Open, with future husband Rodolphe Gilbert as her partner.

== ITF finals ==
=== Singles: 1 (1–0) ===
Outcome	Date	Tournament	Surface	Opponent	Score
Winner	9 December 1990	Le Havre, France	Clay	(France) Nathalie Herreman	4–6, 7–6, 7–6
