= Sandrine Testud =

French tennis player

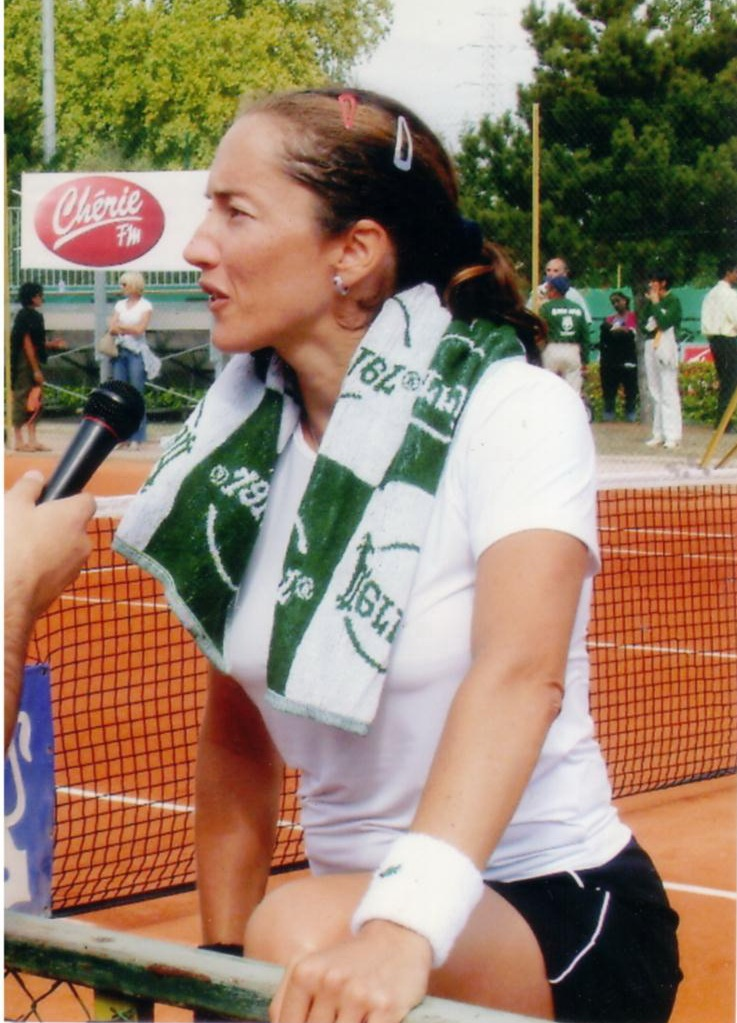
- Country (sports): France
- Residence: Lyon, France
- Born: 3 April 1972 (age 54) Lyon
- Height: 1.76 m (5 ft 9 in)
- Turned pro: 1989
- Retired: 2005
- Plays: Right-handed (two-handed backhand)
- Prize money: $3,782,307

Singles
- Career record: 398–279
- Career titles: 3
- Highest ranking: No. 9 (7 February 2000)

Grand Slam singles results
- Australian Open: QF (1998)
- French Open: 4R (1998, 2001)
- Wimbledon: 4R (1997, 1998, 2001)
- US Open: QF (1997)

Other tournaments
- Tour Finals: SF (2001)
- Olympic Games: 1R (2004)

Doubles
- Career record: 223–190
- Career titles: 4
- Highest ranking: No. 8 (21 August 2000)

Grand Slam doubles results
- Australian Open: 3R (2001, 2002)
- French Open: SF (2004)
- Wimbledon: 3R (1996, 1998, 2000, 2002)
- US Open: F (1999)

Other doubles tournaments
- Tour Finals: 1R (2001)
- Olympic Games: QF (2004)

Team competitions
- Fed Cup: W (1997)

Sandrine Testud (born 3 April 1972) is a former professional tennis player from France.

== Career ==
Testud broke into top 20 singles rankings in July 1997. On February 7, 2000, she became the sixth Frenchwoman after Françoise Dürr, Mary Pierce, Nathalie Tauziat, Amélie Mauresmo and Julie Halard to break into the top 10 in the singles rankings. This marked the first time France had four women ranked in the singles top 10 simultaneously (Mary Pierce at No. 5, Nathalie Tauziat at No. 6, Julie Halard at No. 8 and Testud at No. 9). France was the third nation after the USA and Australia to have more than two representatives in the singles top 10 at any one time. She finished in the top 20 for five consecutive years between 1997 and 2001. In the summer of 2002, she took a break from the tour when she discovered that she was pregnant with her first child. She resumed her career 12 months after the birth of her child and retired in the summer of 2005.

She won a total of three singles and four doubles titles on the WTA Tour. Her biggest singles tournament victory was at the 1998 Tier-II tournament in Filderstadt, Germany, where she defeated world No. 2, Lindsay Davenport, in the final. She was the runner-up in singles and doubles WTA tournaments on seven occasions each. Her third career-title victory that came in Hawaii over Justine Henin happened in a final that was delayed for a day due to the terrorist attacks on the U.S. on September 11, 2001. Her last WTA Tour singles final was in Dubai where she lost to Amélie Mauresmo in what was the fourth all-French final in WTA Tour history. She has gone beyond the fourth round of a Grand Slam tournament on two occasions: she reached the quarterfinals at the 1997 US Open and the 1998 Australian Open. Testud played in the season-ending Tour Championships for five consecutive years from 1997 to 2001; reaching the singles semifinal and doubles quarterfinal in her last appearance in 2001.

In 1999, Testud was the women's doubles runner-up at the US Open with Chanda Rubin, and she reached the women's doubles quarterfinals or better in six Grand Slam tournaments. She was a doubles semifinalist on 21 WTA Tour occasions, excluding Grand Slam tournaments: 1991 (2), 1992 (2), 1993 (1), 1994 (1), 1995 (1), 1996 (4), 1997 (2), 1998 (1), 2000 (3), 2001 (2), 2002 (1), 2005 (1).

Testud represented her country in the Fed Cup between 1997 and 2002. She won her second singles match against the host country Netherlands to give France an unassailable 3–1 lead in the 1997 Fed Cup final in Den Bosch. That was the first time France had won the Fed Cup. She also represented her country in the 2004 Olympic Games in Athens, where she lost in the singles first round and reached the doubles QF with Nathalie Dechy.

Testud married her coach, Vittorio Magnelli, on 13 June 1998. Their daughter, Isabella, was born on 19 February 2003. Their second child, Sophie, was born in 2006.

== WTA career finals ==
=== Singles: 10 (3 titles, 7 runner-ups) ===
Finals by surface
Hard (2–4)
Clay (1–1)
Grass (0–0)
Carpet (0–2)

Result	W/L	Date	Tournament	Surface	Opponent	Score
Win	1–0	Jul 1997	Palermo Ladies Open, Italy	Clay	(Russia) Elena Makarova	7–5, 6–3
Loss	1–1	Aug 1997	Atlanta, United States	Hard	(United States) Lindsay Davenport	4–6, 1–6
Loss	1–2	Jul 1998	Prague Open, Czech Republic	Clay	(Czech Republic) Jana Novotná	3–6, 0–6
Win	2–2	Oct 1998	Porsche Tennis Grand Prix, Germany	Hard (i)	(United States) Lindsay Davenport	7–5, 6–3
Loss	2–3	Oct 1999	Generali Ladies Linz, Austria	Carpet (i)	(France) Mary Pierce	6–7^{(2–7)}, 1–6
Loss	2–4	Jan 2000	Pan Pacific Open, Japan	Carpet (i)	(Switzerland) Martina Hingis	3–6, 5–7
Loss	2–5	Jan 2001	Canberra International, Australia	Hard	(Belgium) Justine Henin	2–6, 2–6
Loss	2–6	Feb 2001	Qatar Open	Hard	(Switzerland) Martina Hingis	3–6, 2–6
Win	3–6	Sep 2001	Waikoloa Championships, US	Hard	(Belgium) Justine Henin	6–3, 2–0 ret.
Loss	3–7	Feb 2002	Dubai Championships, UAE	Hard	(France) Amélie Mauresmo	4–6, 6–7^{(5–7)}

=== Doubles: 11 (4 titles, 7 runner-ups) ===
Result	W/L	Date	Tournament	Surface	Partner	Opponents	Score
Loss	0–1	Apr 1992	Pattaya Open, Thailand	Hard	(France) Pascale Paradis	(France) Isabelle Demongeot (Ukraine) Natalia Medvedeva	1–6, 1–6
Loss	0–2	Jul 1995	San Diego Classic, US	Hard	(France) Alexia Dechaume	(United States) Gigi Fernández (Belarus) Natasha Zvereva	2–6, 1–6
Loss	0–3	Oct 1998	Bell Challenge, Canada	Hard (i)	(United States) Chanda Rubin	(United States) Lori McNeil (United States) Kimberly Po	7–6^{(7–3)}, 5–7, 4–6
Loss	0–4	Aug 1999	US Open	Hard	(United States) Chanda Rubin	(United States) Serena Williams (United States) Venus Williams	6–4, 1–6, 4–6
Win	1–4	Oct 1999	Porsche Tennis Grand Prix, Germany	Hard (i)	(United States) Chanda Rubin	(Latvia) Larisa Neiland (Spain) Arantxa Sánchez Vicario	6–3, 6–4
Loss	1–5	Nov 1999	Philadelphia Championships, US	Carpet (i)	(United States) Chanda Rubin	(United States) Lisa Raymond (Australia) Rennae Stubbs	1–6, 6–7^{(2–7)}
Win	2–5	Feb 2000	Paris Indoor, France	Carpet (i)	(France) Julie Halard	(France) Émilie Loit (Sweden) Åsa Carlsson	3–6, 6–3, 6–4
Win	3–5	Jul 2000	Stanford Classic, US	Hard	(United States) Chanda Rubin	(Zimbabwe) Cara Black (United States) Amy Frazier	6–4, 6–4
Win	4–5	Feb 2001	Qatar Open	Hard	(Italy) Roberta Vinci	(Netherlands) Kristie Boogert (Netherlands) Miriam Oremans	7–5, 7–6^{(7–4)}
Loss	4–6	Oct 2001	Zurich Open, Switzerland	Hard (i)	(Italy) Roberta Vinci	(United States) Lindsay Davenport (United States) Lisa Raymond	3–6, 6–1, 2–6
Loss	4–7	Feb 2002	Dubai Championships, UAE	Hard	(Italy) Roberta Vinci	(Germany) Barbara Rittner (Venezuela) María Vento-Kabchi	3–6, 2–6

== ITF finals ==
Legend
$50,000 tournaments
$25,000 tournaments
$10,000 tournaments

=== Singles (5–0) ===
Result	No.	Date	Tournament	Surface	Opponent	Score
Win	1.	10 April 1989	Limoges, France	Clay	(France) Emmanuelle Derly	3–6, 6–4, 6–4
Win	2.	25 June 1990	Caltagiro, Italy	Clay	(Italy) Lorenza Jachia	7–6, 7–5
Win	3.	5 November 1990	Eastbourne, United Kingdom	Hard (i)	(Poland) Katarzyna Nowak	2–6, 6–3, 6–4
Win	4.	12 November 1990	Swindon, United Kingdom	Carpet (i)	(Belgium) Dominique Monami	6–4, 6–4
Win	5.	12 December 1994	Mildura, Australia	Grass	(Australia) Kerry-Anne Guse	6–1, 6–3

=== Doubles (4–2) ===
Result	No.	Date	Tournament	Surface	Partner	Opponents	Score
Win	1.	27 March 1989	Moulins, France	Hard (i)	(France) Catherine Tanvier	(Netherlands) Mara Eijkenboom (France) Noëlle van Lottum	6–4, 6–3
Loss	2.	26 March 1990	Limoges, France	Carpet (i)	(France) Catherine Tanvier	(Belgium) Ann Devries (Poland) Iwona Kuczyńska	3–6, 6–3, 4–6
Win	3.	2 July 1990	Brindisi, Italy	Clay	(France) Mary Pierce	(United States) Jennifer Fuchs (Netherlands) Simone Schilder	6–1, 1–6, 6–0
Win	4.	6 August 1990	Budapest, Hungary	Clay	(France) Sylvie Sabas	(Czechoslovakia) Denisa Krajčovičová (Czechoslovakia) Alice Noháčová	6–3, 6–4
Win	5.	1 April 1991	Moulins, France	Carpet (i)	(France) Catherine Suire	(Netherlands) Ingelise Driehuis (Australia) Louise Pleming	6–3, 6–4
Loss	6.	9 December 1991	Val-d'Oise, France	Hard (i)	(France) Pascale Paradis-Mangon	(Germany) Eva Pfaff (France) Catherine Suire	6–4, 3–6, 4–6

== Grand Slam singles performance timeline ==
Key
W	F	SF	QF	#R	RR	Q#	DNQ	A	NH

(W) winner; (F) finalist; (SF) semifinalist; (QF) quarterfinalist; (#R) rounds 4, 3, 2, 1; (RR) round-robin stage; (Q#) qualification round; (DNQ) did not qualify; (A) absent; (NH) not held; (SR) strike rate (events won / competed); (W–L) win–loss record.

Tournament	1989	1990	1991	1992	1993	1994	1995	1996	1997	1998	1999	2000	2001	2002	2003	2004	Career SR
Australian Open	A	LQ	A	2R	1R	4R	3R	1R	2R	QF	4R	4R	3R	1R	A	A	0 / 11
French Open	A	1R	1R	2R	1R	1R	2R	3R	3R	4R	2R	3R	4R	1R	A	1R	0 / 14
Wimbledon	A	A	A	1R	1R	1R	2R	2R	4R	4R	3R	1R	4R	2R	A	A	0 / 11
US Open	A	A	LQ	2R	1R	2R	3R	4R	QF	3R	2R	4R	4R	A	A	A	0 / 10
SR	0 / 0	0 / 1	0 / 1	0 / 4	0 / 4	0 / 4	0 / 4	0 / 4	0 / 4	0 / 4	0 / 4	0 / 4	0 / 4	0 / 3	0 / 0	0 / 1	0 / 46
Year-end ranking	265	167	118	106	98	81	41	41	13	14	13	17	11	38	NR	311	

== Head-to-head record ==
- Anke Huber 2–5
- Martina Hingis 0–16
- Lindsay Davenport 2–12
- Silvia Farina Elia 2–5
- Anna Kournikova 0–3
