= 1991 US Open – Men's doubles =

Men's doubles
- 1991 US Open

Final
- Champion: (Australia) John Fitzgerald (Sweden) Anders Järryd
- Runner-up: (United States) Scott Davis (United States) David Pate
- Score: 6–3, 3–6, 6–3, 6–3

Details
- Draw: 64
- Seeds: 16

Events
Singles	men	women		boys	girls
Doubles	men	women	mixed	boys	girls
WC Singles	men	women	quad
WC Doubles	men	women	quad
Legends	men	women	mixed
← 1990 ·	US Open	· 1992 →

The men's doubles tournament at the 1991 US Open was held from August 26 to September 8, 1991, on the outdoor hard courts of the USTA National Tennis Center in New York City, United States. John Fitzgerald and Anders Järryd won the title, defeating Scott Davis and David Pate in the final.

== Seeds ==
1. (Australia) John Fitzgerald / (Sweden) Anders Järryd (champions)
2. (United States) Scott Davis / (United States) David Pate (final)
3. (Canada) Grant Connell / (Canada) Glenn Michibata (second round)
4. (United States) Patrick Galbraith / (United States) Todd Witsken (second round)
5. (United States) Ken Flach / (United States) Robert Seguso (semifinals)
6. (Australia) Todd Woodbridge / (Australia) Mark Woodforde (semifinals)
7. (South Africa) Gary Muller / (South Africa) Danie Visser (first round)
8. (United States) Luke Jensen / (Australia) Laurie Warder (second round)
9. (Germany) Udo Riglewski / (Germany) Michael Stich (quarterfinals)
10. (United States) Rick Leach / (United States) Jim Pugh (second round)
11. (Netherlands) Paul Haarhuis / (Netherlands) Mark Koevermans (second round)
12. (South Africa) Wayne Ferreira / (South Africa) Piet Norval (second round)
13. (Italy) Omar Camporese / (Socialist Federal Republic of Yugoslavia) Goran Ivanišević (second round)
14. (Argentina) Javier Frana / (Mexico) Leonardo Lavalle (third round)
15. (United States) Jim Grabb / (Australia) Mark Kratzmann (first round)
16. (Australia) Wally Masur / (Australia) Jason Stoltenberg (first round)

== Draw ==
=== Key ===
- Q = Qualifier
- WC = Wild card
- LL = Lucky loser
- Alt = Alternate
- ITF = ITF entry
- PR = Protected ranking
- SR = Special ranking
- SE = Special exempt
- JE = Junior exempt
- JR = Junior Accelerator Programme entrant
- CO = College Accelerator Programme entrant
- NG = Next Gen Accelerator Program entrant
- w/o = Walkover
- r = Retired
- d = Defaulted

=== Finals ===
Quarterfinals
1	(Australia) John Fitzgerald (Sweden) Anders Järryd	5	7	6	6
(United States) Matt Lucena (Norway) Bent-Ove Pedersen	7	6	2	4
(United States) Steve DeVries (Australia) David Macpherson	2	4	1
6	(Australia) Todd Woodbridge (Australia) Mark Woodforde	6	6	6
5	(United States) Ken Flach (United States) Robert Seguso	6	6	7
(Sweden) Ronnie Båthman (Sweden) Rikard Bergh	2	3	6
9	(Germany) Udo Riglewski (Germany) Michael Stich	4	6	6	6	3
2	(United States) Scott Davis (United States) David Pate	6	3	7	3	6

Semifinals
1	(Australia) John Fitzgerald (Sweden) Anders Järryd	6	6	6	6
6	(Australia) Todd Woodbridge (Australia) Mark Woodforde	2	7	4	3
5	(United States) Ken Flach (United States) Robert Seguso	5	4	4
2	(United States) Scott Davis (United States) David Pate	7	6	6

Final
1	(Australia) John Fitzgerald (Sweden) Anders Järryd	6	3	6	6
2	(United States) Scott Davis (United States) David Pate	3	6	3	3

=== Top half ===
==== Section 1 ====
First round
1	(Australia) J Fitzgerald (Sweden) A Järryd	6	6
(Sweden) D Engel (Brazil) D Marcelino	4	1
(United States) S Cannon (The Bahamas) R Smith	3	6
(United States) P Annacone (United States) K Jones	6	7
(Brazil) L Mattar (Brazil) J Oncins	6	6
(Spain) S Bruguera (Spain) T Carbonell	2	4
(United States) C Beckman (United States) S Salumaa	6	6
15	(United States) J Grabb (Australia) M Kratzmann	3	4
10	(United States) R Leach (United States) J Pugh	6	6	6
(Israel) G Bloom (United States) D Flach	3	7	2
(Czechoslovakia) P Korda (Czechoslovakia) K Nováček	6	6
(Australia) R Fromberg (Spain) J Sánchez	4	4
(United States) M Lucena (Norway) BO Pedersen	6	6
(Netherlands) T Nijssen (Czechoslovakia) C Suk	4	1
(New Zealand) K Evernden (Netherlands) M Oosting	2	1
8	(United States) L Jensen (Australia) L Warder	6	6

Second round
1	(Australia) J Fitzgerald (Sweden) A Järryd	6	7	6
(United States) P Annacone (United States) K Jones	7	5	3
(Brazil) L Mattar (Brazil) J Oncins	6	3	4
(United States) C Beckman (United States) S Salumaa	4	6	6
10	(United States) R Leach (United States) J Pugh	3	6
(Czechoslovakia) P Korda (Czechoslovakia) K Nováček	6	7
(United States) M Lucena (Norway) BO Pedersen	7	6
8	(United States) L Jensen (Australia) L Warder	5	3

Third round
1	(Australia) J Fitzgerald (Sweden) A Järryd	6	3	6
(United States) C Beckman (United States) S Salumaa	3	6	4
(Czechoslovakia) P Korda (Czechoslovakia) K Nováček	3	6	2
(United States) M Lucena (Norway) BO Pedersen	6	3	6

Quarterfinals
1	(Australia) J Fitzgerald (Sweden) A Järryd	5	7	6	6
(United States) M Lucena (Norway) BO Pedersen	7	6	2	4

==== Section 2 ====
First round
3	(Canada) G Connell (Canada) G Michibata	7	7
(United States) J Brown (United States) S Melville	6	6
(United States) S DeVries (Australia) D Macpherson	6	4	6
(United States) M Keil (United States) F Montana	4	6	1
(United Kingdom) N Brown (United Kingdom) A Castle	3	6	7
(United States) K Kinnear (United States) K Thorne	6	2	6
(United Kingdom) J Bates (United States) K Curren	3	2
14	(Argentina) J Frana (Mexico) L Lavalle	6	6
12	(South Africa) W Ferreira (South Africa) P Norval	4	6	6
(United States) B Garrow (United States) B Pearce	6	3	2
(United States) S Patridge (South Africa) B Talbot	2	6
(Netherlands) HJ Davids (Netherlands) J Eltingh	6	7
(United States) T Nelson (United States) M Washington	6	6
(Sweden) O Jonsson (Venezuela) A González Mora	4	4
(United States) G Layendecker (United States) R Reneberg	7	3	2
6	(Australia) T Woodbridge (Australia) M Woodforde	5	6	6

Second round
3	(Canada) G Connell (Canada) G Michibata	5	6
(United States) S DeVries (Australia) D Macpherson	7	7
(United Kingdom) N Brown (United Kingdom) A Castle	4	4
14	(Argentina) J Frana (Mexico) L Lavalle	6	6
12	(South Africa) W Ferreira (South Africa) P Norval
(Netherlands) HJ Davids (Netherlands) J Eltingh	w/o
(United States) T Nelson (United States) M Washington	3	2
6	(Australia) T Woodbridge (Australia) M Woodforde	6	6

Third round
(United States) S DeVries (Australia) D Macpherson	6	7	6
14	(Argentina) J Frana (Mexico) L Lavalle	7	6	3
(Netherlands) HJ Davids (Netherlands) J Eltingh	4	2
6	(Australia) T Woodbridge (Australia) M Woodforde	6	6

Quarterfinals
(United States) S DeVries (Australia) D Macpherson	2	4	1
6	(Australia) T Woodbridge (Australia) M Woodforde	6	6	6

=== Bottom half ===
==== Section 3 ====
First round
5	(United States) K Flach (United States) R Seguso	6	7
(Peru) P Arraya (Ukraine) D Poliakov	1	5
(Brazil) N Aerts (Brazil) F Roese	6	6
(Switzerland) J Hlasek (Czechoslovakia) T Šmíd	2	4
(United Kingdom) N Broad (South Africa) S Kruger	4	6
(Ecuador) A Gómez (Spain) E Sánchez	6	7
(Australia) B Dyke (Sweden) P Lundgren	4	2
11	(Netherlands) P Haarhuis (Netherlands) M Koevermans	6	6
13	(Italy) O Camporese (Socialist Federal Republic of Yugoslavia) G Ivanišević	6	7
(Czechoslovakia) V Flégl (Czechoslovakia) D Vacek	4	6
(Brazil) R Acioly (Brazil) M Menezes	3	2
(United States) J McEnroe (United States) P McEnroe	6	6
(Sweden) T Svantesson (United States) G Van Emburgh	3	6	4
(Sweden) R Båthman (Sweden) R Bergh	6	2	6
(Spain) F Clavet (Italy) D Nargiso	6	3	2
4	(United States) P Galbraith (United States) T Witsken	3	6	6

Second round
5	(United States) K Flach (United States) R Seguso	7	6
(Brazil) N Aerts (Brazil) F Roese	5	4
(Ecuador) A Gómez (Spain) E Sánchez	7	3	7
11	(Netherlands) P Haarhuis (Netherlands) M Koevermans	6	6	6
13	(Italy) O Camporese (Socialist Federal Republic of Yugoslavia) G Ivanišević	6	4
(United States) J McEnroe (United States) P McEnroe	7	6
(Sweden) R Båthman (Sweden) R Bergh	6	7
4	(United States) P Galbraith (United States) T Witsken	1	6

Third round
5	(United States) K Flach (United States) R Seguso	6	6
(Ecuador) A Gómez (Spain) E Sánchez	0	3
(United States) J McEnroe (United States) P McEnroe	5	6	3
(Sweden) R Båthman (Sweden) R Bergh	7	1	6

Quarterfinals
5	(United States) K Flach (United States) R Seguso	6	6	7
(Sweden) R Båthman (Sweden) R Bergh	2	3	6

==== Section 4 ====
First round
7	(South Africa) G Muller (South Africa) D Visser	7	3	5
(Netherlands) M Schapers (Sweden) J Svensson	6	6	7
WC	(United States) J Palmer (United States) J Stark	6	3	6
(Mexico) J Lozano (United States) J Rive	2	6	2
(Nigeria) N Odizor (United States) B Shelton	7	3	6
(Australia) N Borwick (Australia) S Youl	6	6	7
(United States) B Garnett (United States) R Van't Hof	4	2
9	(Germany) U Riglewski (Germany) M Stich	6	6
16	(Australia) W Masur (Australia) J Stoltenberg	4	6	6
(Czechoslovakia) L Pimek (Kenya) P Wekesa	6	2	7
(Iran) M Bahrami (France) R Gilbert	5	2
(Netherlands) J Siemerink (South Africa) C van Rensburg	7	6
WC	(United States) T Ho (United States) T Martin	7	6
WC	(United States) J Leach (United States) D Witt	6	3
(South Africa) D Adams (Russia) A Olhovskiy	4	4
2	(United States) S Davis (United States) D Pate	6	6

Second round
(Netherlands) M Schapers (Sweden) J Svensson	3	6	4
WC	(United States) J Palmer (United States) J Stark	6	3	6
(Australia) N Borwick (Australia) S Youl	6	2
9	(Germany) U Riglewski (Germany) M Stich	7	6
(Czechoslovakia) L Pimek (Kenya) P Wekesa	6	6
(Netherlands) J Siemerink (South Africa) C van Rensburg	4	4
(United States) T Ho (United States) T Martin	4	2
2	(United States) S Davis (United States) D Pate	6	6

Third round
WC	(United States) J Palmer (United States) J Stark	1	2
9	(Germany) U Riglewski (Germany) M Stich	6	6
(Czechoslovakia) L Pimek (Kenya) P Wekesa	3	4
2	(United States) S Davis (United States) D Pate	6	6

Quarterfinals
9	(Germany) U Riglewski (Germany) M Stich	4	6	6	6	3
2	(United States) S Davis (United States) D Pate	6	3	7	3	6
