= 1991 US Open – Women's singles =

Women's singles
- 1991 US Open

Final
- Champion: (Socialist Federal Republic of Yugoslavia) Monica Seles
- Runner-up: (United States) Martina Navratilova
- Score: 7–6^{(7–1)}, 6–1

Details
- Draw: 128
- Seeds: 16

Events
Singles	men	women		boys	girls
Doubles	men	women	mixed	boys	girls
WC Singles	men	women	quad
WC Doubles	men	women	quad
Legends	men	women	mixed
← 1990 ·	US Open	· 1992 →

Monica Seles defeated Martina Navratilova in the final, 7–6^{(7–1)}, 6–1 to win the women's singles tennis title at the 1991 US Open. It was her first US Open title and fourth major title overall. With the win, Seles recaptured the world No. 1 ranking from Steffi Graf, and would hold it until her 1993 stabbing.

Gabriela Sabatini was the defending champion, but lost in the quarterfinals to Jennifer Capriati.

This marked the first major in which future champion, three-time major champion and world No. 1 Lindsay Davenport competed in the main draw; she lost in the first round to Debbie Graham.

== Seeds ==
1. (Germany) Steffi Graf (semifinals)
2. (Socialist Federal Republic of Yugoslavia) Monica Seles (champion)
3. (Argentina) Gabriela Sabatini (quarterfinals)
4. (Spain) Arantxa Sánchez Vicario (quarterfinals)
5. (United States) Mary Joe Fernández (third round)
6. (United States) Martina Navratilova (final)
7. (United States) Jennifer Capriati (semifinals)
8. (Spain) Conchita Martínez (quarterfinals)
9. (Czechoslovakia) Jana Novotná (fourth round)
10. (Switzerland) Manuela Maleeva (fourth round)
11. (Bulgaria) Katerina Maleeva (third round)
12. (United States) Zina Garrison (fourth round)
13. (Soviet Union) Leila Meskhi (third round)
14. (France) Nathalie Tauziat (first round)
15. (Czechoslovakia) Helena Suková (third round)
16. (Germany) Anke Huber (second round)

== Draw ==
=== Key ===
- Q = Qualifier
- WC = Wild card
- LL = Lucky loser
- Alt = Alternate
- ITF = ITF entry
- PR = Protected ranking
- SR = Special ranking
- SE = Special exempt
- JE = Junior exempt
- JR = Junior Accelerator Programme entrant
- CO = College Accelerator Programme entrant
- NG = Next Gen Accelerator Program entrant
- w/o = Walkover
- r = Retired
- d = Defaulted

=== Finals ===
Quarterfinals
1	(Germany) Steffi Graf	6	6
8	(Spain) Conchita Martínez	1	3
4	(Spain) Arantxa Sánchez Vicario	7^{8}	6^{5}	2
6	(United States) Martina Navratilova	6^{6}	7^{7}	6
7	(United States) Jennifer Capriati	6	7^{7}
3	(Argentina) Gabriela Sabatini	3	6^{1}
(United States) Gigi Fernández	1	2
2	(Socialist Federal Republic of Yugoslavia) Monica Seles	6	6

Semifinals
1	(Germany) Steffi Graf	6^{2}	7^{8}	4
6	(United States) Martina Navratilova	7^{7}	6^{6}	6
7	(United States) Jennifer Capriati	3	6	6^{3}
2	(Socialist Federal Republic of Yugoslavia) Monica Seles	6	3	7^{7}

Final
6	(United States) Martina Navratilova	6^{1}	1
2	(Socialist Federal Republic of Yugoslavia) Monica Seles	7^{7}	6

=== Top half ===
==== Section 1 ====
First round
1	(Germany) S Graf	6	6
(Hungary) A Temesvári	1	2
(Austria) M Maruska	3	4
(France) C Mothes-Jobkel	6	6
(Sweden) C Lindqvist	6	6
Q	(Canada) R Alter	3	3
(Czechoslovakia) E Švíglerová	6	6
(Switzerland) C Caverzasio	4	1
(Austria) J Wiesner	4	6	6
(France) A Dechaume	6	3	3
(United States) S Stafford	6	6
(Argentina) C Tessi	3	3
(United States) A Frazier	6	7^{7}
(United Kingdom) C Wood	3	6^{2}
(Argentina) F Labat	7	6
14	(France) N Tauziat	5	4

Second round
1	(Germany) S Graf	6	6
(France) C Mothes-Jobkel	0	0
(Sweden) C Lindqvist	2	2
(Czechoslovakia) E Švíglerová	6	6
(Austria) J Wiesner	3	6	6
(United States) S Stafford	6	1	4
(United States) A Frazier	6	5	2
(Argentina) F Labat	2	7	6

Third round
1	(Germany) S Graf	6	7
(Czechoslovakia) E Švíglerová	4	5
(Austria) J Wiesner	6	7
(Argentina) F Labat	4	5

Fourth round
1	(Germany) S Graf	7	6
(Austria) J Wiesner	5	4

==== Section 2 ====
First round
12	(United States) Z Garrison	7	6
(Belgium) S Appelmans	5	4
(Italy) A-M Cecchini	7^{7}	6
(United Kingdom) M Javer	6^{2}	1
(United States) S Sloane	4	1
(Germany) B Rittner	6	6
(South Africa) A Coetzer	5	1
(France) J Halard	7	6
(Japan) M Kidowaki	1	4
(Czechoslovakia) K Habšudová	6	6
(Finland) P Thorén	1	4
(United States) P Fendick	6	6
(United States) A Keller	4	3
(Indonesia) N Basuki	6	6
(Sweden) C Dahlman	1	1
8	(Spain) C Martínez	6	6

Second round
12	(United States) Z Garrison	6	6
(Italy) A-M Cecchini	1	1
(Germany) B Rittner	6	6
(France) J Halard	2	0
(Czechoslovakia) K Habšudová	2	3
(United States) P Fendick	6	6
(Indonesia) N Basuki	3	4
8	(Spain) C Martínez	6	6

Third round
12	(United States) Z Garrison	6	3	6
(Germany) B Rittner	2	6	4
(United States) P Fendick	5	3
8	(Spain) C Martínez	7	6

Fourth round
12	(United States) Z Garrison	4	4
8	(Spain) C Martínez	6	6

==== Section 3 ====
First round
4	(Spain) A Sánchez Vicario	6	6
(Italy) K Piccolini	0	1
(Australia) E Smylie	3	4
(Australia) K Godridge	6	6
(Soviet Union) E Brioukhovets	6	6
(United States) L Bonder-Kreiss	3	0
LL	(France) N Herreman	4	6	6
(Germany) C Kohde-Kilsch	6	4	3
WC	(United States) E Burgin	4	4
WC	(United States) K Po	6	6
(Czechoslovakia) P Langrová	4	5
WC	(United States) A Smith	6	7
(Germany) W Probst	1	6^{5}
(Soviet Union) N Zvereva	6	7^{7}
(Australia) A Minter	1	6	1
16	(Germany) A Huber	6	4	6

Second round
4	(Spain) A Sánchez Vicario	6	6
(Australia) K Godridge	1	1
(Soviet Union) E Brioukhovets	6	6^{4}	6^{5}
LL	(France) N Herreman	3	7^{7}	7^{7}
WC	(United States) K Po	6	6
WC	(United States) A Smith	2	4
(Soviet Union) N Zvereva	6	6
16	(Germany) A Huber	2	4

Third round
4	(Spain) A Sánchez Vicario	6	6
LL	(France) N Herreman	2	2
WC	(United States) K Po	1	6	2
(Soviet Union) N Zvereva	6	3	6

Fourth round
4	(Spain) A Sánchez Vicario	6	7^{7}
(Soviet Union) N Zvereva	3	6^{4}

==== Section 4 ====
First round
10	(Switzerland) Man Maleeva	6	6
WC	(United States) S Birch	3	1
(Germany) C Porwik	3	2
(Czechoslovakia) A Strnadová	6	6
(Italy) L Garrone	6	0	6^{2}
(France) M Pierce	4	6	7^{7}
(United States) L McNeil	6	6
(United States) R White	2	2
(Bulgaria) Mag Maleeva	7^{7}	4	6
(Germany) K Kschwendt	6^{5}	6	4
(Japan) R Hiraki	1	1
(United States) P Shriver	6	6
WC	(United States) L Davenport	3	2
(United States) D Graham	6	6
(Argentina) P Tarabini	2	2
6	(United States) M Navratilova	6	6

Second round
10	(Switzerland) Man Maleeva	7	6
(Czechoslovakia) A Strnadová	5	2
(France) M Pierce	6	3	7^{8}
(United States) L McNeil	3	6	6^{6}
(Bulgaria) Mag Maleeva	7^{12}	1	2
(United States) P Shriver	6^{10}	6	6
(United States) D Graham	1	4
6	(United States) M Navratilova	6	6

Third round
10	(Switzerland) Man Maleeva	4	6	5
(France) M Pierce	6	1	1^{r}
(United States) P Shriver	5	1
6	(United States) M Navratilova	7	6

Fourth round
10	(Switzerland) Man Maleeva	6^{5}	6	2
6	(United States) M Navratilova	7^{7}	1	6

=== Bottom half ===
==== Section 5 ====
First round
7	(United States) J Capriati	6	6
Q	(Germany) E Pfaff	1	0
(South Africa) R Fairbank-Nideffer	4	6^{1}
(Austria) P Ritter	6	7^{7}
(Australia) R McQuillan	6	3	6
Q	(France) S Niox-Château	4	6	0
(Canada) P Hy	6	6
(Sweden) M Strandlund	3	0
(South Africa) E Reinach	2	6	6^{6}
(Argentina) B Fulco	6	4	7^{8}
(United Kingdom) J Durie	6	6
(United States) C Cunningham	4	2
(United States) E deLone	6	6^{1}	6
(United States) H Cioffi	2	7^{7}	3
WC	(United States) J Emmons	0	6	2
15	(Czechoslovakia) H Suková	6	4	6

Second round
7	(United States) J Capriati	6	6
(Austria) P Ritter	3	0
(Australia) R McQuillan	1	2
(Canada) P Hy	6	6
(Argentina) B Fulco	4	0
(United Kingdom) J Durie	6	6
(United States) E deLone	1	3
15	(Czechoslovakia) H Suková	6	6

Third round
7	(United States) J Capriati	6	6
(Canada) P Hy	1	4
(United Kingdom) J Durie	6	2	6
15	(Czechoslovakia) H Suková	4	6	1

Fourth round
7	(United States) J Capriati	6	6
(United Kingdom) J Durie	1	2

==== Section 6 ====
First round
9	(Czechoslovakia) J Novotná	6	4	6
(United States) A Grossman	3	6	1
(United States) M Werdel	4	7	4
(United States) M Louie-Harper	6	5	6
(Italy) F Romano	1	4
Q	(Belgium) D Monami	6	6
WC	(United States) C Rubin	6	6
(Italy) S Farina	4	0
(United States) G Helgeson	4	4
(United States) D Faber	6	6
(United States) G Magers	5	6	6
Q	(Soviet Union) E Maniokova	7	4	3
(Germany) S Hack	7^{7}	4	4
(Austria) B Paulus	6^{1}	6	6
(Australia) N Provis	6^{3}	3
3	(Argentina) G Sabatini	7^{7}	6

Second round
9	(Czechoslovakia) J Novotná	6	6
(United States) M Louie-Harper	2	3
Q	(Belgium) D Monami	6	6
WC	(United States) C Rubin	4	3
(United States) D Faber	3	3
(United States) G Magers	6	6
(Austria) B Paulus	3	6	1^{r}
3	(Argentina) G Sabatini	6	4	5

Third round
9	(Czechoslovakia) J Novotná	6	6
Q	(Belgium) D Monami	1	2
(United States) G Magers	3	4
3	(Argentina) G Sabatini	6	6

Fourth round
9	(Czechoslovakia) J Novotná	4	6^{4}
3	(Argentina) G Sabatini	6	7^{7}

==== Section 7 ====
First round
5	(United States) MJ Fernandez	6	6
(Soviet Union) L Savchenko	3	3
(Japan) A Kijimuta	6	3	2
(Netherlands) B Schultz	3	6	6
Q	(United States) R Baranski	2	6^{3}
(Czechoslovakia) R Zrubáková	6	7^{7}
(Japan) K Date	7^{7}	6
(United States) T Whitlinger	6^{3}	4
(United States) G Fernández	6	6
(Germany) S Frankl	0	4
(United States) K Rinaldi	6^{4}	6	6
(Argentina) M Paz	7^{7}	4	1
(Netherlands) N Jagerman	6^{4}	4
(Peru) L Gildemeister	7^{7}	6
(France) P Paradis-Mangon	6	3	2
13	(Soviet Union) L Meskhi	3	6	6

Second round
5	(United States) MJ Fernandez	7^{7}	6
(Netherlands) B Schultz	6^{4}	3
(Czechoslovakia) R Zrubáková	7	6^{5}	6
(Japan) K Date	5	7^{7}	3
(United States) G Fernández	6	6
(United States) K Rinaldi	4	1
(Peru) L Gildemeister	4	6	0
13	(Soviet Union) L Meskhi	6	3	6

Third round
5	(United States) MJ Fernandez	1	2
(Czechoslovakia) R Zrubáková	6	6
(United States) G Fernández	7^{7}	6^{3}	7^{7}
13	(Soviet Union) L Meskhi	6^{1}	7^{7}	6^{2}

Fourth round
(Czechoslovakia) R Zrubáková	2	2
(United States) G Fernández	6	6

==== Section 8 ====
First round
11	(Bulgaria) K Maleeva	6	6
(Netherlands) M Bollegraf	3	4
(France) C Suire	1	7^{10}	3
(South Africa) M de Swardt	6	6^{8}	6
(Czechoslovakia) R Rajchrtová	6	6
(Switzerland) C Bartos-Cserepy	1	3
(Italy) L Ferrando	4	2
(Japan) N Sawamatsu	6	6
(France) N van Lottum	3	5
(Canada) H Kelesi	6	7
Q	(Netherlands) S Rottier	3	1
(United Kingdom) S Gomer	6	6
Q	(Poland) K Nowak	5	1
(Switzerland) E Zardo	7	6
WC	(United States) N Arendt	2	0
2	(Socialist Federal Republic of Yugoslavia) M Seles	6	6

Second round
11	(Bulgaria) K Maleeva	6	6
(South Africa) M de Swardt	3	4
(Czechoslovakia) R Rajchrtová	6	6
(Japan) N Sawamatsu	2	4
(Canada) H Kelesi	2	6	3
(United Kingdom) S Gomer	6	2	6
(Switzerland) E Zardo	0	6	0
2	(Socialist Federal Republic of Yugoslavia) M Seles	6	4	6

Third round
11	(Bulgaria) K Maleeva	6	3	3
(Czechoslovakia) R Rajchrtová	2	6	6
(United Kingdom) S Gomer	1	4
2	(Socialist Federal Republic of Yugoslavia) M Seles	6	6

Fourth round
(Czechoslovakia) R Rajchrtová	1	1
2	(Socialist Federal Republic of Yugoslavia) M Seles	6	6

Preceded by 1991 Wimbledon Championships – Women's singles	Grand Slam women's singles	Succeeded by 1992 Australian Open – Women's singles
