= Renata Marcinkowska =

Polish-American tennis player

- Full name: Renata Marcinkowska
- Country (sports): Poland; United States
- Born: 24 February 1965 (age 60); Szczecin, Poland
- Prize money: $170,727

Singles
- Career record: 140–127
- Highest ranking: No. 116 (November 12, 1990)

Grand Slam singles results
- Australian Open: 1R (1989, 1991)
- French Open: 2R (1991)
- Wimbledon: 1R (1990)
- US Open: 1R (1990, 1991)

Doubles
- Career record: 65–83

Grand Slam doubles results
- Australian Open: 2R (1991)
- French Open: 1R (1991)
- Wimbledon: 1R (1991)
- US Open: 1R (1991)

Renata Marcinkowska (born 24 February 1965) is a Polish-American former professional tennis player. She competed during her professional tennis career as Renata Baranski.

== Biography ==
Born in Szczecin, Marcinkowska left Poland in 1981 to compete in the United States. Once there she received a scholarship to the Oklahoma State University, where she was an All-American collegiate tennis player. While at Oklahoma State she got married and became known as Renata Baranski. She graduated with a psychology degree in 1987, then joined the professional tour.

Her best performances on the WTA Tour include the semifinals at Guaruja in 1989 as well as the quarterfinals at both the 1989 OTB Open in Schenectady and the 1991 Virginia Slims of Oklahoma. As a doubles player she made a WTA Tour final at the 1991 Nivea Cup in São Paulo, where she and Laura Glitz finished as runners-up.

Marcinkowska played in the main draw of all four Grand Slam.

Becoming a naturalized U.S. citizen in 1991, Marcinkowska lives in South Carolina and works as a teaching professional. She trains players on a dual surface court she invented, which is one half hard and the other clay.

== WTA Tour finals ==
=== Doubles (0–1) ===
Result	Date	Tournament	Tier	Surface	Partner	Opponents	Score
Loss	December, 1991	São Paulo, Brazil	Tier V	Clay	(United States) Laura Glitz	(Argentina) Inés Gorrochategui (Argentina) Mercedes Paz	2–6, 2–6

== ITF finals ==
$25,000 tournaments
$10,000 tournaments

=== Singles: (3–3) ===
Result	No.	Date	Tournament	Surface	Opponent	Score
Loss	1.	8 June 1986	Miramar, Florida, United States	Hard	(United States) Ronni Reis	4–6, 2–6
Loss	2.	22 June 1986	Fayetteville, United States	Hard	(South Korea) Lee Jeong-soon	4–6, 6–4, 2–6
Win	1.	28 June 1987	Augusta, Georgia, United States	Hard	(United States) Shaun Stafford	7–6^{(3)}, 3–6, 6–4
Win	2.	17 July 1988	Greensboro, North Carolina, United States	Clay	(United States) Kim Kessaris	4–6, 6–1, 6–3
Win	3.	31 July 1988	Evansville, Indiana, United States	Clay	(United States) Pamela Jung	6–3, 6–2
Loss	3.	5 March 1989	Miami, Florida, United States	Hard	(United States) Andrea Farley	4–6, 1–6

=== Doubles: (3–3) ===
Result	No.	Date	Tournament	Surface	Partner	Opponents	Score
Win	1.	13 July 1986	Boynton Beach, Florida, United States	Hard	(Australia) Robyn Lamb	(United States) Jennifer Fuchs (United States) Kathrin Keil	6–4, 6–3
Loss	1.	18 January 1987	Miami, Florida, United States	Hard	(United States) Deeann Hansel	(United States) Cheryl Jones (United States) Rochelle Morrisson	5–7, 6–7
Loss	2.	20 June 1988	Mobile, Alabama, United States	Hard	(Australia) Robyn Lamb	(South Korea) Kim Il-soon (South Korea) Lee Jeong-myung	5–7, 2–6
Win	2.	10 July 1989	Greensboro, North Carolina, United States	Clay	(United States) Courtney Allen	(Denmark) Sofie Albinus (United States) Shawn Foltz	2–6, 6–3, 6–3
Win	3.	15 October 1989	Mobile, Alabama, United States	Hard	(United States) Sandy Collins	(United States) Kathy Foxworth (United States) Vincenza Procacci	6–3, 6–4
Loss	3.	26 February 1990	Key Biscayne, Florida, United States	Hard	(South Africa) Linda Barnard	(United States) Jennifer Fuchs (Sweden) Maria Strandlund	4–6, 4–6
