= 1991 US Open – Men's singles =

Men's singles
- 1991 US Open

Final
- Champion: (Sweden) Stefan Edberg
- Runner-up: (United States) Jim Courier
- Score: 6–2, 6–4, 6–0

Details
- Draw: 128
- Seeds: 16

Events
Singles	men	women		boys	girls
Doubles	men	women	mixed	boys	girls
WC Singles	men	women	quad
WC Doubles	men	women	quad
Legends	men	women	mixed
- US Open

Stefan Edberg defeated Jim Courier in the final, 6–2, 6–4, 6–0 to win the men's singles tennis title at the 1991 US Open. It was his first US Open singles title and fifth major singles title overall.

Pete Sampras was the defending champion, but lost in the quarterfinals to Courier.

Five-time champion Jimmy Connors, who turned 39 during the tournament, entered as a wildcard and reached the semifinals before losing to Courier. Connors was the oldest male semifinalist at the tournament since Ken Rosewall in 1974 (whom Connors himself then defeated in the final).

== Seeds ==
The seeded players are listed below. Stefan Edberg was the champion; others show the round in which they were eliminated.

1. (Germany) Boris Becker (third round)
2. (Sweden) Stefan Edberg (champion)
3. (Germany) Michael Stich (quarterfinalist)
4. (United States) Jim Courier (finalist)
5. (Czechoslovakia) Ivan Lendl (semifinalist)
6. (United States) Pete Sampras (quarterfinalist)
7. (France) Guy Forget (second round)
8. (United States) Andre Agassi (first round)
9. (Spain) Sergi Bruguera (second round)
10. (Czechoslovakia) Karel Nováček (third round)
11. (United States) David Wheaton (fourth round)
12. (Croatia) Goran Ivanišević (fourth round)
13. (Soviet Union) Andrei Cherkasov (first round)
14. (Spain) Emilio Sánchez (fourth round)
15. (Czechoslovakia) Petr Korda (first round)
16. (United States) John McEnroe (third round)

== Draw ==
Key

- Q = Qualifier
- WC = Wild card
- LL = Lucky loser
- Alt = Alternate
- ITF = ITF entry
- PR = Protected ranking
- SR = Special ranking
- SE = Special exempt
- JE = Junior exempt
- JR = Junior Accelerator Programme entrant
- CO = College Accelerator Programme entrant
- NG = Next Gen Accelerator Program entrant
- w/o = Walkover
- r = Retired
- d = Defaulted

=== Finals ===
Quarterfinals
(Netherlands) Paul Haarhuis	6	6^{3}	4	2
WC	(United States) Jimmy Connors	4	7^{7}	6	6
4	(United States) Jim Courier	6	7^{7}	7^{7}
6	(United States) Pete Sampras	2	6^{4}	6^{5}
5	(Czechoslovakia) Ivan Lendl	6	3	4	7^{7}	6
3	(Germany) Michael Stich	3	6	6	6^{5}	1
(Spain) Javier Sánchez	3	2	3
2	(Sweden) Stefan Edberg	6	6	6

Semifinals
WC	(United States) Jimmy Connors	3	3	2
4	(United States) Jim Courier	6	6	6
5	(Czechoslovakia) Ivan Lendl	3	3	4
2	(Sweden) Stefan Edberg	6	6	6

Final
4	(United States) Jim Courier	2	4	0
2	(Sweden) Stefan Edberg	6	6	6

=== Top half ===
==== Section 1 ====
First round
1	(Germany) B Becker	7^{7}	6	6
(Argentina) M Jaite	6^{3}	4	4
(Mexico) L Herrera	6^{5}	3	6	4
(Soviet Union) A Volkov	7^{7}	6	3	6
(Germany) E Jelen	6	2	1	6	2
(Netherlands) P Haarhuis	2	6	6	3	6
(Sweden) M Pernfors	2	2	3
(Soviet Union) A Chesnokov	6	6	6
WC	(United States) J Pugh	3	7^{7}	6^{2}	6	3
Q	(South Africa) G Stafford	6	6^{4}	7^{7}	3	6
WC	(United States) C Adams	2	5	3
(Germany) C-U Steeb	6	7	6
Q	(United States) F Montana	7^{7}	6	3	0	3
(Sweden) C Bergström	6^{5}	4	6	6	6
(France) A Boetsch	6	6	3	6
15	(Czechoslovakia) P Korda	1	3	6	2

Second round
1	(Germany) B Becker	6	7^{7}	6
(Soviet Union) A Volkov	0	6^{4}	1
(Netherlands) P Haarhuis	6	4	6	7^{7}
(Soviet Union) A Chesnokov	1	6	2	6^{2}
Q	(South Africa) G Stafford	0	6^{6}	1
(Germany) C-U Steeb	6	7^{8}	6
(Sweden) C Bergström	2	3	1	r
(France) A Boetsch	6	6	2

Third round
1	(Germany) B Becker	3	4	2
(Netherlands) P Haarhuis	6	6	6
(Germany) C-U Steeb	3	6	6	6
(France) A Boetsch	6	3	4	4

Fourth round
(Netherlands) P Haarhuis	6	6	6
(Germany) C-U Steeb	2	3	4

==== Section 2 ====
First round
10	(Czechoslovakia) K Nováček	6	5	6	6
(United States) S Davis	3	7	1	3
Q	(Canada) G Michibata	3	4	6^{4}
(Portugal) N Marques	6	6	7^{7}
WC	(United States) J Connors	4	6^{4}	6	6	6
(United States) P McEnroe	6	7^{7}	4	2	4
Q	(Netherlands) M Schapers	4	6	6	6
(Spain) J F Altur	6	4	2	1
(Switzerland) M Rosset	7	3	3	6	3
(France) G Raoux	5	6	6	4	6
(United States) R Reneberg	6^{6}	7^{7}	4	2
(Spain) F Clavet	7^{8}	6^{5}	6	6
(Peru) J Yzaga	7	7	7
(United States) T Mayotte	5	5	5
(United States) A Krickstein	7	7^{7}	6
8	(United States) A Agassi	5	6^{3}	2

Second round
10	(Czechoslovakia) K Nováček	6^{1}	7^{7}	6	3	6
(Portugal) N Marques	7^{7}	6^{5}	4	6	3
WC	(United States) J Connors	6	6	6
Q	(Netherlands) M Schapers	2	3	2
(France) G Raoux	1	1	4
(Spain) F Clavet	6	6	6
(Peru) J Yzaga	1	6	1	2	r
(United States) A Krickstein	6	3	6	3

Third round
10	(Czechoslovakia) K Nováček	1	4	3
WC	(United States) J Connors	6	6	6
(Spain) F Clavet	4	4	7^{7}	6^{4}
(United States) A Krickstein	6	6	6^{0}	7^{7}

Fourth round
WC	(United States) J Connors	3	7^{10}	1	6	7^{7}
(United States) A Krickstein	6	6^{8}	6	3	6^{4}

==== Section 3 ====
First round
4	(United States) J Courier	6	6	6
(Sweden) N Kulti	3	4	4
(United States) J Arias	7	7	3	6
(Sweden) P Lundgren	5	5	6	3
(Italy) C Pistolesi	6	6	3	2	2
(France) T Champion	3	4	6	6	6
(Sweden) A Järryd	6	6	6
(Peru) P Arraya	1	3	3
(Australia) W Masur	4	6	6	6
Q	(United States) P Williamson	6	3	3	2
WC	(United States) M Joyce	3	7^{8}	6	6
Q	(United States) P Crow	6	6^{6}	4	4
Q	(United Kingdom) A Castle	0	7	6	7
(Belgium) B Wuyts	6	5	4	5
WC	(United States) D Witt	4	4	6	3
14	(Spain) E Sánchez	6	6	3	6

Second round
4	(United States) J Courier	6	6	6
(United States) J Arias	3	2	0
(France) T Champion	5	2	1	r
(Sweden) A Järryd	7	6	1
(Australia) W Masur	6	6	3	6
WC	(United States) M Joyce	4	3	6	3
Q	(United Kingdom) A Castle	3	2	2
14	(Spain) E Sánchez	6	6	6

Third round
4	(United States) J Courier	6	6	6
(Sweden) A Järryd	3	2	2
(Australia) W Masur	4	6^{6}	6^{5}
14	(Spain) E Sánchez	6	7^{8}	7^{7}

Fourth round
4	(United States) J Courier	6	6	6
14	(Spain) E Sánchez	4	4	3

==== Section 4 ====
First round
11	(United States) D Wheaton	6	4	7^{9}	6
(Australia) R Fromberg	0	6	6^{7}	3
(New Zealand) K Evernden	6	6^{1}	4	2
(Austria) H Skoff	4	7^{7}	6	6
WC	(United States) T Martin	6	7^{8}	6
(South Africa) G Muller	3	6^{6}	2
Q	(United Kingdom) D Sapsford	6	7	6
(Soviet Union) A Olhovskiy	3	5	1
(France) J-P Fleurian	1	7^{7}	6	4	2
Q	(France) S Simian	6	6^{0}	3	6	6
(United States) K Curren	3	2	6	6	6
(France) F Santoro	6	6	3	3	3
(France) C Pioline	6^{5}	6	2	6	3
(South Africa) W Ferreira	7^{7}	4	6	2	6
(South Africa) C van Rensburg	0	3	2
6	(United States) P Sampras	6	6	6

Second round
11	(United States) D Wheaton	6	6	6
(Austria) H Skoff	1	2	2
WC	(United States) T Martin	6	6	3	4	6
Q	(United Kingdom) D Sapsford	2	3	6	6	2
Q	(France) S Simian	6	6^{4}	7^{7}	6
(United States) K Curren	3	7^{7}	6^{4}	4
(South Africa) W Ferreira	1	2	2	r
6	(United States) P Sampras	6	6	2

Third round
11	(United States) D Wheaton	7^{7}	4	6	6
WC	(United States) T Martin	6^{3}	6	3	4
Q	(France) S Simian	6^{3}	4	7^{7}	3
6	(United States) P Sampras	7^{7}	6	6^{4}	6

Fourth round
11	(United States) D Wheaton	6	2	2	4
6	(United States) P Sampras	3	6	6	6

=== Bottom half ===
==== Section 5 ====
First round
5	(Czechoslovakia) I Lendl	3	2	6	7^{7}	6
(Netherlands) R Krajicek	6	6	4	6^{5}	0
Q	(Australia) S Youl	6^{4}	7^{7}	4	2
(Germany) P Kühnen	7^{7}	6^{5}	6	6
(Germany) C Saceanu	2	7^{7}	6	6
(Czechoslovakia) M Vajda	6	6^{4}	4	4
(Australia) T Woodbridge	6	6	6
Q	(Haiti) B Madsen	2	0	2
(Israel) G Bloom	6	6	2	2	4
(Italy) C Caratti	4	3	6	6	6
(Brazil) L Mattar	6	3	7^{12}	6
WC	(United States) R Leach	3	6	6^{10}	2
(Croatia) G Prpić	2	6	6	1	6
(United States) B Gilbert	6	4	2	6	4
(Sweden) H Holm	7^{7}	3	3	6^{1}
12	(Croatia) G Ivanišević	6^{5}	6	6	7^{7}

Second round
5	(Czechoslovakia) I Lendl	6	6	6
(Germany) P Kühnen	3	2	4
(Germany) C Saceanu	2	3	3
(Australia) T Woodbridge	6	6	6
(Italy) C Caratti	6	3	0	6^{3}
(Brazil) L Mattar	3	6	6	7^{7}
(Croatia) G Prpić	1	3	4
12	(Croatia) G Ivanišević	6	6	6

Third round
5	(Czechoslovakia) I Lendl	3	6	6	6
(Australia) T Woodbridge	6	3	4	3
(Brazil) L Mattar	3	2	2
12	(Croatia) G Ivanišević	6	6	6

Fourth round
5	(Czechoslovakia) I Lendl	7	6^{3}	6	6
12	(Croatia) G Ivanišević	5	7^{7}	4	2

==== Section 6 ====
First round
13	(Soviet Union) A Cherkasov	6^{2}	2	2
(Sweden) J Svensson	7^{7}	6	6
(Argentina) R Azar	3	5	3
(Switzerland) J Hlasek	6	7	6
(Germany) P Baur	0	2	3
(United States) D Rostagno	6	6	6
(France) R Gilbert	6	6	5	1	7^{7}
WC	(United States) J Palmer	1	2	7	6	6^{5}
(Italy) O Camporese	5	6	7	3	6
(Israel) A Mansdorf	7	4	5	6	3
(United States) M Washington	6	6	6
(Brazil) J Oncins	2	2	1
(Argentina) A Mancini	2	4	6	7^{7}	2
Q	(United States) J Brown	6	6	3	6^{4}	6
(Netherlands) J Eltingh	6^{5}	1	0
3	(Germany) M Stich	7^{7}	6	6

Second round
(Sweden) J Svensson	4	5	7^{7}	3
(Switzerland) J Hlasek	6	7	6^{5}	6
(United States) D Rostagno	7^{7}	6	6
(France) R Gilbert	6^{3}	1	3
(Italy) O Camporese	6	1	1	4
(United States) M Washington	4	6	6	6
Q	(United States) J Brown
3	(Germany) M Stich	w/o

Third round
(Switzerland) J Hlasek	7^{7}	6^{3}	6^{2}	6^{4}
(United States) D Rostagno	6^{2}	7^{7}	7^{7}	7^{7}
(United States) M Washington	7	5	2	6	3
3	(Germany) M Stich	5	7	6	4	6

Fourth round
(United States) D Rostagno	2	6	1	6^{4}
3	(Germany) M Stich	6	3	6	7^{7}

==== Section 7 ====
First round
7	(France) G Forget	7	6	6
Q	(South Africa) M Ondruska	5	3	1
(Netherlands) J Siemerink	5	7	3	6	6
(Soviet Union) D Poliakov	7	5	6	4	4
(Argentina) G Markus	7^{7}	7^{7}	7^{7}
(Italy) D Nargiso	6^{1}	6^{4}	6^{2}
(Italy) S Pescosolido	7^{8}	6^{5}	2	6	6
(United States) D Pate	6^{6}	7^{7}	6	2	3
(Sweden) M Larsson	4	6	7^{10}	2	6
(Ecuador) A Gómez	6	3	6^{8}	6	1
Q	(Sweden) D Engel	3	4	4
(Argentina) J Frana	6	6	6
(Spain) J Sánchez	6	6	3
(Germany) A Mronz	2	3	1	r
(Spain) T Carbonell	6	6	3	6^{3}	3
9	(Spain) S Bruguera	3	4	6	7^{7}	6

Second round
7	(France) G Forget	6	3	2	6^{6}
(Netherlands) J Siemerink	4	6	6	7^{8}
(Argentina) G Markus	6	1	4	7^{7}	6
(Italy) S Pescosolido	2	6	6	6^{5}	2
(Sweden) M Larsson	4	6	6	6
(Argentina) J Frana	6	4	2	4
(Spain) J Sánchez	7^{7}	6	6
9	(Spain) S Bruguera	6^{5}	3	0

Third round
(Netherlands) J Siemerink	4	4	6	7^{7}	6^{9}
(Argentina) G Markus	6	6	1	6^{4}	7^{11}
(Sweden) M Larsson	6^{3}	0	3
(Spain) J Sánchez	7^{7}	6	6

Fourth round
(Argentina) G Markus	4	2	3
(Spain) J Sánchez	6	6	6

==== Section 8 ====
First round
16	(United States) J McEnroe	6	6	6
Q	(United States) G Layendecker	4	3	3
Q	(Canada) M Laurendeau	7	7^{10}	3	7
(Haiti) R Agénor	5	6^{8}	6	5
(Finland) V Paloheimo	3	7	4	1
(United States) T Witsken	6	5	6	6
(United States) M Chang	6	6	6
(Australia) M Woodforde	3	0	2
(Netherlands) M Koevermans	4	6^{5}	2
(United States) J Grabb	6	7^{7}	6
(Australia) J Stoltenberg	6	7^{7}	6
(Canada) G Connell	4	6^{5}	2
(India) R Krishnan	2	1	7^{7}	7	3
(United States) J Tarango	6	6	6^{5}	5	6
(United States) B Shelton	4	6	6^{4}	1
2	(Sweden) S Edberg	6	2	7^{7}	6

Second round
16	(United States) J McEnroe	6	6	6
Q	(Canada) M Laurendeau	3	4	2
(United States) T Witsken	3	0	2
(United States) M Chang	6	6	6
(United States) J Grabb	7	6	4	7
(Australia) J Stoltenberg	5	4	6	5
(United States) J Tarango	3	5	0
2	(Sweden) S Edberg	6	7	6

Third round
16	(United States) J McEnroe	4	6	6^{1}	6	3
(United States) M Chang	6	4	7^{7}	2	6
(United States) J Grabb	6^{8}	6	3	4
2	(Sweden) S Edberg	7^{10}	4	6	6

Fourth round
(United States) M Chang	6^{2}	5	3
2	(Sweden) S Edberg	7^{7}	7	6

Preceded by 1991 Wimbledon Championships – Men's singles	Grand Slam men's singles	Succeeded by 1992 Australian Open – Men's singles
