= Rachel Jensen =

American tennis player

- Full name: Rachel Ann Jensen Faucett
- Country (sports): United States
- Born: November 19, 1972 (age 52)
- Prize money: $57,633

Singles
- Highest ranking: No. 237 (June 8, 1992)

Doubles
- Highest ranking: No. 197 (January 9, 1995)

Grand Slam doubles results
- Australian Open: 1R (1995)

Grand Slam mixed doubles results
- US Open: 1R (1991)

Rachel Ann Jensen Faucett (born November 19, 1972) is a former professional tennis player from the United States.

== Biography ==
Jensen was one of four sibling to play professional tennis, along with twin sister Rebecca and elder brothers Luke and Murphy, who won the French Open together.

Turning professional in 1991, Jensen was the only one of her siblings not to be a doubles specialist. She had a best ranking in singles of 237 in the world and took a set off the top seeded Mary Joe Fernandez at Indian Wells in 1993. As a doubles player she featured in the main draw of the 1991 US Open mixed doubles with brother Luke and the 1995 Australian Open women's doubles partnering Anke Huber.

She is now Rachel Faucett after marriage.
