= 1991 US Open (tennis) =

- Date: August 26 – September 8
- Edition: 111th
- Category: Grand Slam (ITF)
- Surface: Hardcourt
- Location: New York City, New York, United States

Champions

Men's singles
- (Sweden) Stefan Edberg

Women's singles
- (Socialist Federal Republic of Yugoslavia) Monica Seles

Men's doubles
- (Australia) John Fitzgerald / (Sweden) Anders Järryd

Women's doubles
- (United States) Pam Shriver / (Soviet Union) Natasha Zvereva

Mixed doubles
- (Netherlands) Manon Bollegraf / (Netherlands) Tom Nijssen

Boys' singles
- (India) Leander Paes

Girls' singles
- (Czechoslovakia) Karina Habšudová

Boys' doubles
- (Morocco) Karim Alami / (South Africa) John-Laffnie de Jager

Girls' doubles
- (Australia) Kristin Godridge / (Australia) Nicole Pratt
- US Open

The 1991 US Open was a tennis tournament played on outdoor hard courts at the USTA National Tennis Center in New York City in New York in the United States. It was the 111th edition of the US Open and was held from August 26 to September 8, 1991.

== Seniors ==
=== Men's singles ===
(Sweden) Stefan Edberg defeated (United States) Jim Courier 6–2, 6–4, 6–0

- It was Edberg's 5th career Grand Slam title and his 1st US Open title.

=== Women's singles ===
(Socialist Federal Republic of Yugoslavia) Monica Seles defeated (United States) Martina Navratilova 7–6^{(7–1)}, 6–1

- It was Seles' 4th career Grand Slam title and her 1st US Open title.

=== Men's doubles ===
(Australia) John Fitzgerald / (Sweden) Anders Järryd defeated (United States) Scott Davis / (United States) David Pate 6–3, 3–6, 6–3, 6–3

- It was Fitzgerald's 9th and last career Grand Slam title and his 3rd US Open title. It was Järryd's 8th and last career Grand Slam title and his 2nd US Open title.

=== Women's doubles ===
(United States) Pam Shriver / (Soviet Union) Natasha Zvereva defeated (Czechoslovakia) Jana Novotná / (Soviet Union) Larisa Savchenko 6–4, 4–6, 7–6^{(7–5)}

- It was Shriver's 22nd and last career Grand Slam title and her 5th US Open title. It was Zvereva's 4th career Grand Slam title and her 1st US Open title.

=== Mixed doubles ===
(Netherlands) Manon Bollegraf / (Netherlands) Tom Nijssen defeated (Spain) Arantxa Sánchez Vicario / (Spain) Emilio Sánchez 6–2, 7–6^{(7–2)}

- It was Bollegraf's 2nd career Grand Slam title and her 1st US Open title. It was Nijssen's 2nd and last career Grand Slam title and his only US Open title.

== Juniors ==
=== Boys' singles ===
(India) Leander Paes defeated (Morocco) Karim Alami 6–4, 6–4

=== Girls' singles ===
(Czechoslovakia) Karina Habšudová defeated (United States) Anne Mall 6–1, 6–3

=== Boys' doubles ===
(Morocco) Karim Alami / (South Africa) John-Laffnie de Jager defeated (United States) Michael Joyce / (United States) Vince Spadea 6–4, 6–7, 6–1

=== Girls' doubles ===
(Australia) Kristin Godridge / (Australia) Nicole Pratt defeated (Sweden) Åsa Carlsson / (Romania) Cătălina Cristea 7–6, 7–5

| Preceded by 1991 Wimbledon Championships | Grand Slams | Succeeded by 1992 Australian Open |
