= Eva Pfaff =

German tennis player

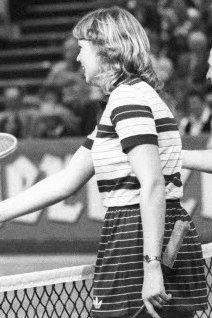
- Eva Pfaff (1983)
- Country (sports): Germany
- Born: 10 February 1961 (age 64) Königstein, West Germany
- Turned pro: 1980
- Retired: 1993
- Plays: Right-handed
- Prize money: $767,709

Singles
- Career record: 186– 216
- Career titles: 1 WTA
- Highest ranking: No. 17 (21 November 1983)

Grand Slam singles results
- Australian Open: QF (1982)
- French Open: 3R (1981, 1984)
- Wimbledon: 4R (1983)
- US Open: 2R (1986)

Doubles
- Career record: 278–194
- Career titles: 9 WTA, 6 ITF
- Highest ranking: No. 16 (4 July 1988)

Grand Slam doubles results
- Australian Open: F (1982)
- French Open: QF (1983, 1985, 1987)
- Wimbledon: QF (1983, 1988)
- US Open: 3R (1985, 1986, 1989)

Eva Pfaff (born 10 February 1961) is a German former professional tennis player.

== Career ==
During her career, she won one singles title and nine doubles titles on the WTA Tour. Her peak world rankings in the sport were 17th in singles (in 1983) and 16th in doubles (1988).

At the 1983 Canadian Open, Pfaff held match points against Martina Navratilova in the round of 16, but lost 6–7 in the third set. She was the only player to have match points against Navratilova that year outside of Martina's loss at the French Open to Kathy Horvath.

== Major finals ==
=== Grand Slam tournaments ===
==== Doubles: 1 runner–up ====
| Result | Year | Championship | Surface | Partner | Opponent | Score |
|---|---|---|---|---|---|---|
| Loss | 1982 | Australian Open | Grass | (West Germany) Claudia Kohde-Kilsch | (United States) Martina Navratilova (United States) Pam Shriver | 4–6, 2–6 |

=== Year-end championships ===
==== Doubles: 1 runner–up ====
| Result | Year | Championship | Surface | Partner | Opponent | Score |
|---|---|---|---|---|---|---|
| Loss | 1983 | New York | Carpet (i) | (West Germany) Claudia Kohde-Kilsch | (United States) Martina Navratilova (United States) Pam Shriver | 5–7, 2–6 |

== WTA Tour career finals ==
=== Singles: 3 (1 title, 2 runner-ups) ===
| Winner — Legend Grand Slam tournaments (0–0) WTA Tour Championships (0–0) Virginia Slims, Avon, other (1–2) | Finals by surface Hard (0–0) Grass (0–0) Clay (0–1) Carpet (1–1) |

| Result | W-L | Date | Tournament | Surface | Opponent | Score |
|---|---|---|---|---|---|---|
| Loss | 0–1 | Jan 1982 | Pittsburgh, US | Carpet (i) | (West Germany) Claudia Kohde-Kilsch | 4–6, 0–6 |
| Win | 1–1 | Feb 1982 | Nashville, US | Carpet (i) | (United States) Leigh-Anne Thompson | 6–3, 7–5 |
| Loss | 1–2 | Jul 1983 | Hittfeld, West Germany | Clay | (Hungary) Andrea Temesvári | 4–6, 2–6 |

=== Doubles: 19 (9 titles, 10 runner-ups) ===
| Winner — Legend Grand Slam tournaments (0–1) WTA Championships (0–1) Tier I (0–0) Tier II (2–0) Tier III (2–0) Tier IV (0–0) Tier V (0–0) Virginia Slims, Avon, other (5–8) | Finals by surface Hard (1–2) Grass (1–4) Clay (5–2) Carpet (2–2) |

| Result | W-L | Date | Tournament | Surface | Partner | Opponent | Score |
|---|---|---|---|---|---|---|---|
| Win | 1–0 | Jul 1980 | Kitzbühel, Austria | Clay | (West Germany) Claudia Kohde-Kilsch | (Czechoslovakia) Hana Mandlíková (Czechoslovakia) Renáta Tomanová | w/o |
| Win | 2–0 | Jul 1981 | Kitzbühel, Austria | Clay | (West Germany) Claudia Kohde-Kilsch | (Australia) Elizabeth Little (South Africa) Yvonne Vermaak | 6–4, 6–3 |
| Loss | 2–1 | Nov 1982 | Brisbane, Australia | Grass | (West Germany) Claudia Kohde-Kilsch | (United States) Billie Jean King (United States) Anne Smith | 3–6, 4–6 |
| Loss | 2–2 | Nov 1982 | Sydney, Australia | Grass | (West Germany) Claudia Kohde-Kilsch | (United States) Martina Navratilova (United States) Pam Shriver | 2–6, 6–2, 6–7 |
| Loss | 2–3 | Nov 1982 | Australian Open | Grass | (West Germany) Claudia Kohde-Kilsch | (United States) Martina Navratilova (United States) Pam Shriver | 4–6, 2–6 |
| Win | 3–3 | Feb 1983 | Oakland, US | Carpet (i) | (West Germany) Claudia Kohde-Kilsch | (United States) Rosie Casals (Australia) Wendy Turnbull | 6–4, 4–6, 6–4 |
| Loss | 3–4 | Mar 1983 | VS Championships, US | Carpet (i) | (West Germany) Claudia Kohde-Kilsch | (United States) Martina Navratilova (United States) Pam Shriver | 5–7, 2–6 |
| Loss | 3–5 | May 1983 | Berlin, West Germany | Clay | (West Germany) Claudia Kohde-Kilsch | (United Kingdom) Jo Durie (United Kingdom) Anne Hobbs | 4–6, 6–7 |
| Win | 4–5 | Jul 1983 | Freiburg, West Germany | Clay | (West Germany) Bettina Bunge | (Argentina) Ivanna Madruga (Argentina) Emilse Raponi-Longo | 6–1, 6–2 |
| Loss | 4–6 | Oct 1984 | Los Angeles, LA | Hard | (West Germany) Bettina Bunge | (United States) Chris Evert-Lloyd (Australia) Wendy Turnbull | 2–6, 4–6 |
| Loss | 4–7 | Oct 1984 | Filderstadt, West Germany | Hard (i) | (West Germany) Bettina Bunge | (West Germany) Claudia Kohde-Kilsch (Czechoslovakia) Helena Suková | 2–6, 6–4, 3–6 |
| Loss | 4–8 | Nov 1984 | Brisbane, Australia | Grass | (West Germany) Bettina Bunge | (United States) Martina Navratilova (United States) Pam Shriver | 3–6, 2–6 |
| Loss | 4–9 | May 1985 | Lugano, Switzerland | Clay | (West Germany) Bettina Bunge | (United States) Bonnie Gadusek (Czechoslovakia) Helena Suková | 2–6, 4–6 |
| Win | 5–9 | Apr 1987 | Hilton Head Island, US | Clay | (Argentina) Mercedes Paz | (United States) Zina Garrison (United States) Lori McNeil | 7–6^{(8–6)}, 7–5 |
| Loss | 5–10 | Nov 1987 | Worcester, UK | Carpet (i) | (West Germany) Bettina Bunge | (United States) Elise Burgin (South Africa) Rosalyn Fairbank | 4–6, 4–6 |
| Win | 6–10 | Feb 1988 | Dallas, US | Carpet (i) | (United States) Lori McNeil | (United States) Gigi Fernández (United States) Zina Garrison | 2–6, 6–4, 7–5 |
| Win | 7–10 | Apr 1988 | Amelia Island, US | Clay | (United States) Zina Garrison | (United States) Katrina Adams (United States) Penny Barg | 4–6, 6–2, 7–6^{(7–5)} |
| Win | 8–10 | Jun 1988 | Eastbourne, UK | Grass | (Australia) Elizabeth Smylie | (New Zealand) Belinda Cordwell (South Africa) Dianne Van Rensburg | 6–3, 7–6^{(8–6)} |
| Win | 9–10 | Oct 1990 | Zürich, Switzerland | Hard (i) | (Netherlands) Manon Bollegraf | (France) Catherine Suire (South Africa) Dianne Van Rensburg | 7–5, 6–4 |

== ITF finals ==
=== Doubles (6–1) ===
Legend
$50,000 tournaments
$25,000 tournaments
$10,000 tournaments

| Result | No. | Date | Tournament | Surface | Partner | Opponents | Score |
|---|---|---|---|---|---|---|---|
| Win | 1. | 17 August 1980 | Dachau, West Germany | Clay | (West Germany) Claudia Kohde-Kilsch | (United Kingdom) Cathy Drury (Romania) Florența Mihai | 6–2, 6–0 |
| Win | 2. | 24 August 1980 | Bayreuth, West Germany | Clay | (West Germany) Claudia Kohde-Kilsch | (Sweden) Helena Anliot (West Germany) Iris Riedel-Kühn | 2–6, 6–3, 6–1 |
| Win | 3. | 31 August 1980 | Stuttgart, West Germany | Clay | (West Germany) Claudia Kohde-Kilsch | (Netherlands) Elly Appel-Vessies (Italy) Sabina Simmonds | 6–3, 6–4 |
| Win | 4. | 13 December 1981 | Neumünster, West Germany | Clay (i) | (West Germany) Claudia Kohde-Kilsch | (West Germany) Heidi Eisterlehner (West Germany) Gabriela Dinu | 7–6, 7–6 |
| Win | 5. | 9 July 1990 | Erlangen, West Germany | Clay | (Hungary) Réka Szikszay | (Soviet Union) Agnese Blumberga (Soviet Union) Eugenia Maniokova | 6–3, 6–1 |
| Loss | 6. | 17 September 1990 | Chiba, Japan | Hard | (New Zealand) Julie Richardson | (Australia) Michelle Jaggard-Lai (United States) Marianne Werdel | 4–6, 7–6, 6–7 |
| Win | 7. | 9 December 1991 | Val-d'Oise, France | Hard (i) | (France) Catherine Suire | (France) Pascale Paradis-Mangon (France) Sandrine Testud | 4–6, 6–3, 6–4 |

== Grand Slam singles tournament timeline ==
Key
| W | F | SF | QF | #R | RR | Q# | DNQ | A | NH |

(W) winner; (F) finalist; (SF) semifinalist; (QF) quarterfinalist; (#R) rounds 4, 3, 2, 1; (RR) round-robin stage; (Q#) qualification round; (DNQ) did not qualify; (A) absent; (NH) not held; (SR) strike rate (events won / competed); (W–L) win–loss record.

| Tournament | 1980 | 1981 | 1982 | 1983 | 1984 | 1985 | 1986 | 1987 | 1988 | 1989 | 1990 | 1991 | 1992 | Career SR |
|---|---|---|---|---|---|---|---|---|---|---|---|---|---|---|
| Australian Open | A | 2R | QF | 3R | 1R | A | NH | 3R | 1R | 2R | 1R | 2R | Q1 | 0 / 9 |
| French Open | A | 3R | 2R | 1R | 3R | 1R | 1R | 1R | 2R | 1R | A | A | A | 0 / 9 |
| Wimbledon | A | 2R | 2R | 4R | 1R | 2R | 1R | 1R | 1R | 2R | 2R | A | Q1 | 0 / 10 |
| US Open | A | 1R | 1R | 1R | A | 1R | 2R | 1R | 1R | 1R | Q1 | 1R | A | 0 / 9 |
| SR | 0 / 0 | 0 / 4 | 0 / 4 | 0 / 4 | 0 / 3 | 0 / 3 | 0 / 3 | 0 / 4 | 0 / 4 | 0 / 4 | 0 / 2 | 0 / 2 | 0 / 0 | 0 / 37 |
| Year-end ranking | 101 | 70 | 35 | 21 | 31 | 31 | 58 | 44 | 74 | 103 | 153 | 201 | 421 | |
