= 1991 Wimbledon Championships – Girls' singles =

Girls' singles
- 1991 Wimbledon Championships

Final
- Champion: (Germany) Barbara Rittner
- Runner-up: (Soviet Union) Elena Makarova
- Score: 6–7^{(6–8)}, 6–2, 6–3

Events
Singles	men	women		boys	girls
Doubles	men	women	mixed	boys	girls
WC Singles	men	women	quad
WC Doubles	men	women	quad
Legends	men	women	seniors
← 1990 ·	Wimbledon Championships	· 1992 →

Barbara Rittner defeated Elena Makarova in the final, 6–7^{(6–8)}, 6–2, 6–3 to win the girls' singles tennis title at the 1991 Wimbledon Championships.

== Seeds ==
1. (Germany) Barbara Rittner (champion)
2. (Australia) Kristin Godridge (semifinals)
3. n/a
4. (Australia) Nicole Pratt (third round)
5. (United States) Chanda Rubin (quarterfinals)
6. (United States) Pam Nelson (quarterfinals)
7. (United Kingdom) Sarah Bentley (first round)
8. (Australia) Joanne Limmer (third round)
9. (Australia) Catherine Barclay (first round)
10. (Czechoslovakia) Zdeňka Málková (quarterfinals)
11. (Japan) Ai Sugiyama (third round)
12. (Israel) Anna Smashnova (third round)
13. (South Korea) Park Sung-hee (quarterfinals)
14. (South Africa) Joannette Kruger (second round)
15. (Argentina) María José Gaidano (third round)
16. (Germany) Meike Babel (first round)

Click on the seed number of a player to go to their draw section.

== Draw ==
=== Key ===
- Q = Qualifier
- WC = Wild card
- LL = Lucky loser
- Alt = Alternate
- SE = Special exempt
- PR = Protected ranking
- ITF = ITF entry
- JE = Junior exempt
- w/o = Walkover
- r = Retired
- d = Defaulted
- SR = Special ranking

=== Finals ===
Quarterfinals
1	(Germany) Barbara Rittner	7^{7}	6
(Paraguay) Rossana de los Ríos	6^{4}	1
13	(South Korea) Park Sung-hee	3	4
6	(United States) Pam Nelson	6	6
5	(United States) Chanda Rubin	0	3
(Soviet Union) Elena Makarova	6	6
10	(Czechoslovakia) Zdeňka Málková	4	4
2	(Australia) Kristin Godridge	6	6

Semifinals
1	(Germany) Barbara Rittner	3	6	6
6	(United States) Pam Nelson	6	1	2
(Soviet Union) Elena Makarova	6	3	6
2	(Australia) Kristin Godridge	4	6	3

Final
1	(Germany) Barbara Rittner	6^{6}	6	6
(Soviet Union) Elena Makarova	7^{8}	2	3

=== Top half ===
==== Section 1 ====
First round
1	(Germany) Barbara Rittner	6	6
(Socialist Federal Republic of Yugoslavia) Maja Murić	4	1
(Netherlands) Linda Niemantsverdriet	6	6
(Australia) Angie Woolcock	3	4
(India) Divya Merchant	2	2
(Austria) Katharina Büche	6	6
(Chile) María-Alejandra Quezada	1	1
15	(Argentina) María José Gaidano	6	6
9	(Australia) Catherine Barclay	4	5
(United Kingdom) Julie Pullin	6	7
(United Kingdom) Heather Matthews	3	2
(Paraguay) Rossana de los Ríos	6	6
(United Kingdom) Karen Cross	3	6	4
(Philippines) Joanne Feria	6	4	6
(South Africa) Cindy Summers	1	5
8	(Australia) Joanne Limmer	6	7

Second round
1	(Germany) B Rittner	6	6
(Netherlands) L Niemantsverdriet	4	1
(Austria) K Buche	6	5	2
15	(Argentina) MJ Gaidano	4	7	6
(United Kingdom) J Pullin	2	4
(Paraguay) R de los Ríos	6	6
(Philippines) J Feria	1	4
8	(Australia) J Limmer	6	6

Third round
1	(Germany) B Rittner	2	6	6
15	(Argentina) MJ Gaidano	6	1	1
(Paraguay) R de los Ríos	6	4	6
8	(Australia) J Limmer	4	6	4

Quarterfinals
1	(Germany) B Rittner	7^{7}	6
(Paraguay) R de los Ríos	6^{4}	1

==== Section 2 ====
First round
4	(Australia) Nicole Pratt	6	6
(Thailand) Suvimol Duangchan	0	2
(Czechoslovakia) Eva Martincová	6	6
(Socialist Federal Republic of Yugoslavia) Iva Majoli	3	0
(United Kingdom) Caroline Hunt	4	2
(Israel) Limor Zaltz	6	6
(Zimbabwe) Alison Vaughan	0	1
13	(South Korea) Park Sung-hee	6	6
11	(Japan) Ai Sugiyama	6	6
(Paraguay) Larissa Schaerer	4	4
(Denmark) Pernille Sørensen	3	3
(United Kingdom) Shirli-Ann Siddall	6	6
(Dominican Republic) Joelle Schad	6	6
(Guam) Wendy Huynh-Nhu	0	4
(Indonesia) Mimma Chernovita	3	1
6	(United States) Pam Nelson	6	6

Second round
4	(Australia) N Pratt	6	7
(Czechoslovakia) E Martincová	5	3
(Israel) L Zaltz	2	4
13	(South Korea) S-h Park	6	6
11	(Japan) A Sugiyama	6	6
(United Kingdom) S-A Siddall	3	0
(Dominican Republic) J Schad	2	2
6	(United States) P Nelson	6	6

Third round
4	(Australia) N Pratt	3	6^{3}
13	(South Korea) S-h Park	6	7^{7}
11	(Japan) A Sugiyama	6	4	3
6	(United States) P Nelson	1	6	6

Quarterfinals
13	(South Korea) S-h Park	3	4
6	(United States) P Nelson	6	6

=== Bottom half ===
==== Section 3 ====
First round
5	(United States) Chanda Rubin	6	6
(Mexico) Wendy Martínez	4	2
(Japan) Mami Donoshiro	6	6
(Peru) Gianfranca Devercelli	3	4
(South Africa) Estelle Gevers	6	0	6
(Philippines) Francesca La'O	1	6	2
(Japan) Kazue Takuma	3	1
12	(Israel) Anna Smashnova	6	6
14	(South Africa) Joannette Kruger	6	6
(Norway) Cathrine Instebø	2	2
(Soviet Union) Elena Makarova	6	6
(Argentina) María Florencia Cianfagna	2	2
(Paraguay) Viviana Valdovinos	2	3
(United Kingdom) Amanda Wainwright	6	6
(India) Aradhana Reddy	6	6
(United Kingdom) Joanne Ward	4	3

Second round
5	(United States) C Rubin	2	6	6
(Japan) M Donoshiro	6	4	3
(South Africa) E Gevers	1	3
12	(Israel) A Smashnova	6	6
14	(South Africa) J Kruger	3	4
(Soviet Union) E Makarova	6	6
(United Kingdom) A Wainwright	2	6	7
(India) A Reddy	6	2	5

Third round
5	(United States) C Rubin	6	6
12	(Israel) A Smashnova	0	4
(Soviet Union) E Makarova	6	6
(United Kingdom) A Wainwright	1	2

Quarterfinals
5	(United States) C Rubin	0	3
(Soviet Union) E Makarova	6	6

==== Section 4 ====
First round
7	(United Kingdom) Sarah Bentley	6	4	3
(Japan) Yuka Tanaka	4	6	6
(Socialist Federal Republic of Yugoslavia) Bojana Janković	3	6	3
(Thailand) Benjamas Sangaram	6	2	6
(South Africa) Nicole Simunic	6	6
(Philippines) Jennifer Saret	2	1
(France) Julie Foillard	3	2
10	(Czechoslovakia) Zdeňka Málková	6	6
16	(Germany) Meike Babel	2	6^{3}
(Netherlands) Kristie Boogert	6	7^{7}
(United Kingdom) Colette Hall	4	7	6
(United States) Nicole Hummel	6	5	1
(Italy) Rita Grande	6	6
(Bolivia) Cecilia Ampuero	0	1
(Uruguay) Laura Olave	1	1
2	(Australia) Kristin Godridge	6	6

Second round
(Japan) Y Tanaka	6	2	6
(Thailand) B Sangaram	4	6	4
(South Africa) N Simunic	1^{r}
10	(Czechoslovakia) Z Málková	4
(Netherlands) K Boogert	6	6^{5}	10
(United Kingdom) C Hall	2	7^{7}	8
(Italy) R Grande	2	6	6
2	(Australia) K Godridge	6	3	8

Third round
(Japan) Y Tanaka	5	1
10	(Czechoslovakia) Z Málková	7	6
(Netherlands) K Boogert	3	6	2
2	(Australia) K Godridge	6	4	6

Quarterfinals
10	(Czechoslovakia) Z Málková	4	4
2	(Australia) K Godridge	6	6
