= 1991 Wimbledon Championships – Girls' doubles =

Girls' doubles
- 1991 Wimbledon Championships

Final
- Champions: (Australia) Catherine Barclay (Israel) Limor Zaltz
- Runners-up: (Australia) Joanne Limmer (Australia) Angie Woolcock
- Score: 6–4, 6–4

Events
Singles	men	women		boys	girls
Doubles	men	women	mixed	boys	girls
WC Singles	men	women	quad
WC Doubles	men	women	quad
Legends	men	women	seniors
← 1990 ·	Wimbledon Championships	· 1992 →

Catherine Barclay and Limor Zaltz defeated Joanne Limmer and Angie Woolcock in the final, 6–4, 6–4 to win the girls' doubles tennis title at the 1991 Wimbledon Championships.

== Seeds ==
1. (Australia) Kristin Godridge / (Australia) Nicole Pratt (first round)
2. (Australia) Joanne Limmer / (Australia) Angie Woolcock (final)
3. (Czechoslovakia) Zdeňka Málková / (Czechoslovakia) Eva Martincová (quarterfinals)
4. (Australia) Catherine Barclay / (Israel) Limor Zaltz (champions)

== Draw ==
=== Key ===
- Q = Qualifier
- WC = Wild card
- LL = Lucky loser
- Alt = Alternate
- SE = Special exempt
- PR = Protected ranking
- ITF = ITF entry
- JE = Junior exempt
- w/o = Walkover
- r = Retired
- d = Defaulted
- SR = Special ranking

=== Draw ===
First round
1	(Australia) Kristin Godridge (Australia) Nicole Pratt	2	0
(Thailand) Suvimol Duangchan (Thailand) Benjamas Sangaram	6	6
(United Kingdom) Sarah Bentley (United Kingdom) Caroline Hunt	5	3
(South Korea) Park Sung-hee (Philippines) Jennifer Saret	7	6
4	(Australia) Catherine Barclay (Israel) Limor Zaltz	6	5	6
(Netherlands) Kristie Boogert (Netherlands) Linda Niemantsverdriet	1	7	3
(United Kingdom) Colette Hall (United Kingdom) Shirli-Ann Siddall	3	6	1
(South Africa) Joannette Kruger (South Africa) Cindy Summers	6	3	6
(Soviet Union) Elena Makarova (Socialist Federal Republic of Yugoslavia) Maja Murić	4	6	8
(Germany) Meike Babel (Germany) Barbara Rittner	6	4	6
(Paraguay) Rossana de los Ríos (Paraguay) Larissa Schaerer	4	6	0
3	(Czechoslovakia) Zdeňka Málková (Czechoslovakia) Eva Martincová	6	3	6
(United Kingdom) Julie Pullin (United Kingdom) Amanda Wainwright	2	3
(United States) Pam Nelson (United States) Chanda Rubin	6	6
(Japan) Mami Donoshiro (Japan) Ai Sugiyama	6	4	4
2	(Australia) Joanne Limmer (Australia) Angie Woolcock	3	6	6

Quarterfinals
(Thailand) Suvimol Duangchan (Thailand) Benjamas Sangaram	6	6^{3}	3
(South Korea) Park Sung-hee (Philippines) Jennifer Saret	2	7^{7}	6
4	(Australia) Catherine Barclay (Israel) Limor Zaltz	6	6
(South Africa) Joannette Kruger (South Africa) Cindy Summers	3	2
(Soviet Union) Elena Makarova (Socialist Federal Republic of Yugoslavia) Maja Murić	6	6
3	(Czechoslovakia) Zdeňka Málková (Czechoslovakia) Eva Martincová	4	4
(United States) Pam Nelson (United States) Chanda Rubin	7	1	6
2	(Australia) Joanne Limmer (Australia) Angie Woolcock	5	6	8

Semifinals
(South Korea) Park Sung-hee (Philippines) Jennifer Saret	7	4	4
4	(Australia) Catherine Barclay (Israel) Limor Zaltz	5	6	6
(Soviet Union) Elena Makarova (Socialist Federal Republic of Yugoslavia) Maja Murić	6	3	3
2	(Australia) Joanne Limmer (Australia) Angie Woolcock	3	6	6

Final
4	(Australia) Catherine Barclay (Israel) Limor Zaltz	6	6
2	(Australia) Joanne Limmer (Australia) Angie Woolcock	4	4
