= 1991 Wimbledon Championships – Boys' singles =

Boys' singles
- 1991 Wimbledon Championships

Final
- Champion: (Sweden) Thomas Enqvist
- Runner-up: (United States) Michael Joyce
- Score: 6–4, 6–3

Events
Singles	men	women		boys	girls
Doubles	men	women	mixed	boys	girls
WC Singles	men	women	quad
WC Doubles	men	women	quad
Legends	men	women	seniors
← 1990 ·	Wimbledon Championships	· 1992 →

Thomas Enqvist defeated Michael Joyce in the final, 6–4, 6–3 to win the boys' singles tennis title at the 1991 Wimbledon Championships.

== Seeds ==
1. (Morocco) Karim Alami (second round)
2. (Sweden) Thomas Enqvist (champion)
3. (Soviet Union) Andriy Medvedev (third round)
4. (United States) David Witt (first round)
5. (Germany) David Prinosil (second round)
6. (Australia) Grant Doyle (third round)
7. (Argentina) Juan Garat (second round)
8. (Indonesia) Benny Wijaya (second round)
9. (Czechoslovakia) Pavel Gazda (first round)
10. (Australia) Joshua Eagle (second round)
11. (Australia) Paul Kilderry (semifinals)
12. (Canada) Greg Rusedski (semifinals)
13. (Germany) Scott Gessner (quarterfinals)
14. (Denmark) Kenneth Carlsen (quarterfinals)
15. (Australia) Stephen Gleeson (third round)
16. (South Korea) Song Hyeong-keun (third round)

Click on the seed number of a player to go to their draw section.

== Draw ==
=== Key ===
- Q = Qualifier
- WC = Wild card
- LL = Lucky loser
- Alt = Alternate
- SE = Special exempt
- PR = Protected ranking
- ITF = ITF entry
- JE = Junior exempt
- w/o = Walkover
- r = Retired
- d = Defaulted
- SR = Special ranking

=== Finals ===
Quarterfinals
(United States) Michael Joyce	6	3	6
(Australia) Jamie Holmes	4	6	3
13	(Germany) Scott Gessner	5	2
12	(Canada) Greg Rusedski	7	6
11	(Australia) Paul Kilderry	7^{7}	7^{7}
14	(Denmark) Kenneth Carlsen	6^{4}	6^{5}
(United States) Vince Spadea	7^{7}	4	3
2	(Sweden) Thomas Enqvist	6^{2}	6	6

Semifinals
(United States) Michael Joyce	6	7^{7}
12	(Canada) Greg Rusedski	4	6^{4}
11	(Australia) Paul Kilderry	2	2
2	(Sweden) Thomas Enqvist	6	6

Final
(United States) Michael Joyce	4	3
2	(Sweden) Thomas Enqvist	6	6

=== Top half ===
==== Section 1 ====
First round
1	(Morocco) Karim Alami	6	6
(Chile) Patricio Delgado	4	1
(Mexico) Erik Casas	3	3
(United States) Michael Joyce	6	6
(Japan) Hideki Kaneko	6	6
(United Kingdom) Paul Robinson	3	3
(New Zealand) James Greenhalgh	1	3
16	(South Korea) Song Hyeong-keun	6	6
10	(Australia) Joshua Eagle	6	6
(India) Rohit Reddy	3	1
(South Africa) John-Laffnie de Jager	2	6	8
(Soviet Union) Sargis Sargsian	6	4	10
(Denmark) Allan Larsen	1	1
(Australia) Jamie Holmes	6	6
(Sweden) Magnus Martinelle	3	6^{3}
8	(Indonesia) Benny Wijaya	6	7^{7}

Second round
1	(Morocco) K Alami	6	5	3
(United States) M Joyce	3	7	6
(Japan) H Kaneko	2	5
16	(South Korea) H-k Song	6	7
10	(Australia) J Eagle	6^{1}	2
(Soviet Union) S Sargsian	7^{7}	6
(Australia) J Holmes	7^{7}	6^{2}	6
8	(Indonesia) Benny Wijaya	6^{2}	7^{7}	4

Third round
(United States) M Joyce	6	6
16	(South Korea) H-k Song	2	4
(Soviet Union) S Sargsian	7^{7}	4	2
(Australia) J Holmes	6^{4}	6	6

Quarterfinals
(United States) M Joyce	6	3	6
(Australia) J Holmes	4	6	3

==== Section 2 ====
First round
4	(United States) David Witt	6^{2}	6	3
(Austria) Johannes Unterberger	7^{7}	4	6
(Nigeria) Emmanuel Udozorh	1	4
(United Kingdom) James Baily	6	6
(Czechoslovakia) Dušan Prchlík	6	7
(India) Nitin Kirtane	3	5
(Socialist Federal Republic of Yugoslavia) Robert Sujević	2	3
13	(Germany) Scott Gessner	6	6
12	(Canada) Greg Rusedski	6	6
(Chile) Francisco Ruiz	3	3
(United Kingdom) Charles Wheeler	5	6^{6}
(Indonesia) Freddy Setiawan	7	7^{8}
(United States) Brian Dunn	6	6
(Mexico) Andrés Urencio	1	4
(Thailand) Sarawuth Yongchantanasukul	1	2
6	(Australia) Grant Doyle	6	6

Second round
(Austria) J Unterberger	6	7
(United Kingdom) J Baily	4	5
(Czechoslovakia) D Prchlík	1	3
13	(Germany) S Gessner	6	6
12	(Canada) G Rusedski	6	6
(Indonesia) F Setiawan	2	2
(United States) B Dunn	4	3
6	(Australia) G Doyle	6	6

Third round
(Austria) J Unterberger	4	7^{7}	3
13	(Germany) S Gessner	6	6^{2}	6
12	(Canada) G Rusedski	6	6
6	(Australia) G Doyle	4	2

Quarterfinals
13	(Germany) S Gessner	5	2
12	(Canada) G Rusedski	7	6

=== Bottom half ===
==== Section 3 ====
First round
5	(Germany) David Prinosil	6	6
(Austria) Julian Knowle	1	2
(Italy) Mosé Navarra	6	7
(Argentina) Lucas Arnold Ker	1	6
(United Kingdom) Miles Maclagan	6	6^{3}	6
(Socialist Federal Republic of Yugoslavia) Vuk Jovanović	2	7^{7}	0
(South Africa) Gerrit Steenkamp	4	2
11	(Australia) Paul Kilderry	6	6
14	(Denmark) Kenneth Carlsen	6	5	6
(Nigeria) Sule Ladipo	4	7	3
(India) Sandeep Kirtane	6^{2}	5
(United States) Jon Leach	7^{7}	7
(Argentina) Carlos Tarantino	3	4
(United Kingdom) Mark Schofield	6	6
(Indonesia) David Waworuntu	4	3
3	(Soviet Union) Andriy Medvedev	6	6

Second round
5	(Germany) D Prinosil	4	4
(Italy) M Navarra	6	6
(United Kingdom) M Maclagan	3	7	0
11	(Australia) P Kilderry	6	5	6
14	(Denmark) K Carlsen	6	4	6
(United States) J Leach	3	6	4
(United Kingdom) M Schofield	4	2
3	(Soviet Union) A Medvedev	6	6

Third round
(Italy) M Navarra	3	4
11	(Australia) P Kilderry	6	6
14	(Denmark) K Carlsen	6	6
3	(Soviet Union) A Medvedev	1	3

Quarterfinals
11	(Australia) P Kilderry	7^{7}	7^{7}
14	(Denmark) K Carlsen	6^{4}	6^{5}

==== Section 4 ====
First round
7	(Argentina) Juan Garat	6	6
(Poland) Grzegorz Zgoła	1	3
(Germany) Alex Rădulescu	6	7
(Mexico) Enrique Abaroa	4	5
(Chile) Gabriel Silberstein	2	4
(South Africa) Neville Godwin	6	6
(United States) Vince Spadea	7	6
9	(Czechoslovakia) Pavel Gazda	5	4
15	(Australia) Stephen Gleeson	7^{12}	7^{7}
(Japan) Tetsuya Chaen	6^{10}	6^{0}
(India) Mahesh Bhupathi	7	6
(United Kingdom) Lee Sabin	5	3
(Thailand) Nathapol Ploysuk	3	3
(France) Nicolas Kischkewitz	6	6
(Uruguay) Joaquín Elola	6	3
2	(Sweden) Thomas Enqvist	7	6

Second round
7	(Argentina) J Garat	6	2	4
(Germany) A Rădulescu	2	6	6
(South Africa) N Godwin	6^{5}	2
(United States) V Spadea	7^{7}	6
15	(Australia) S Gleeson	6	6
(India) M Bhupathi	2	2
(France) N Kischkewitz	4	5
2	(Sweden) T Enqvist	6	7

Third round
(Germany) A Rădulescu	5	4
(United States) V Spadea	7	6
15	(Australia) S Gleeson	6^{5}	1
2	(Sweden) T Enqvist	7^{7}	6

Quarterfinals
(United States) V Spadea	7^{7}	4	3
2	(Sweden) T Enqvist	6^{2}	6	6
