= 1991 Wimbledon Championships – Boys' doubles =

Boys' doubles
- 1991 Wimbledon Championships

Final
- Champions: (Morocco) Karim Alami (Canada) Greg Rusedski
- Runners-up: (South Africa) John-Laffnie de Jager (Soviet Union) Andriy Medvedev
- Score: 1–6, 7–6^{(7–4)}, 6–4

Events
Singles	men	women		boys	girls
Doubles	men	women	mixed	boys	girls
WC Singles	men	women	quad
WC Doubles	men	women	quad
Legends	men	women	seniors
← 1990 ·	Wimbledon Championships	· 1992 →

Karim Alami and Greg Rusedski defeated John-Laffnie de Jager and Andriy Medvedev in the final, 1–6, 7–6^{(7–4)}, 6–4 to win the boys' doubles tennis title at the 1991 Wimbledon Championships.

== Seeds ==
1. (Australia) Grant Doyle / (Australia) Joshua Eagle (quarterfinals)
2. (Australia) Jamie Holmes / (Australia) Paul Kilderry (semifinals)
3. (South Africa) John-Laffnie de Jager / (Soviet Union) Andriy Medvedev (final)
4. (Morocco) Karim Alami / (Canada) Greg Rusedski

== Draw ==
=== Key ===
- Q = Qualifier
- WC = Wild card
- LL = Lucky loser
- Alt = Alternate
- SE = Special exempt
- PR = Protected ranking
- ITF = ITF entry
- JE = Junior exempt
- w/o = Walkover
- r = Retired
- d = Defaulted
- SR = Special ranking

=== Draw ===
First round
1	(Australia) Grant Doyle (Australia) Joshua Eagle	6	6
(Czechoslovakia) Pavel Gazda (Czechoslovakia) Dušan Prchlík	2	4
(Denmark) Kenneth Carlsen (Denmark) Allan Larsen	6	6
(Argentina) Juan Garat (Germany) Thomas Winkler	4	4
3	(South Africa) John-Laffnie de Jager (Soviet Union) Andriy Medvedev	3	6	6
(Australia) Stephen Gleeson (United Kingdom) Paul Robinson	6	1	4
(United States) Jon Leach (United States) David Witt	6	6
(Nigeria) Sule Ladipo (Nigeria) Emmanuel Udozorh	2	2
(United States) Michael Joyce (United States) Vince Spadea	6	6
(United Kingdom) Miles Maclagan (United Kingdom) Mark Schofield	3	2
(South Korea) Song Hyeong-keun (Indonesia) Benny Wijaya	3	4
4	(Morocco) Karim Alami (Canada) Greg Rusedski	6	6
(Austria) Julian Knowle (Austria) Johannes Unterberger	3	5
(Sweden) Thomas Enqvist (Sweden) Magnus Martinelle	6	7
(Mexico) Enrique Abaroa (Mexico) Erik Casas	7^{9}	3	3
2	(Australia) Jamie Holmes (Australia) Paul Kilderry	6^{7}	6	6

Quarterfinals
1	(Australia) Grant Doyle (Australia) Joshua Eagle	4	6	5
(Denmark) Kenneth Carlsen (Denmark) Allan Larsen	6	3	7
3	(South Africa) John-Laffnie de Jager (Soviet Union) Andriy Medvedev	6	6
(United States) Jon Leach (United States) David Witt	1	4
(United States) Michael Joyce (United States) Vince Spadea	6^{8}	6	10
4	(Morocco) Karim Alami (Canada) Greg Rusedski	7^{10}	3	12
(Sweden) Thomas Enqvist (Sweden) Magnus Martinelle	3	2
2	(Australia) Jamie Holmes (Australia) Paul Kilderry	6	6

Semifinals
(Denmark) Kenneth Carlsen (Denmark) Allan Larsen	3	2
3	(South Africa) John-Laffnie de Jager (Soviet Union) Andriy Medvedev	6	6
4	(Morocco) Karim Alami (Canada) Greg Rusedski	6	4	6
2	(Australia) Jamie Holmes (Australia) Paul Kilderry	3	6	4

Final
3	(South Africa) John-Laffnie de Jager (Soviet Union) Andriy Medvedev	6	6^{4}	4
4	(Morocco) Karim Alami (Canada) Greg Rusedski	1	7^{7}	6
