= 1991 Wimbledon Championships – Men's singles =

Men's singles
- 1991 Wimbledon Championships

Final
- Champion: (Germany) Michael Stich
- Runner-up: (Germany) Boris Becker
- Score: 6–4, 7–6^{(7–4)}, 6–4

Details
- Draw: 128 (16 Q / 8 WC )
- Seeds: 16

Events
Singles	men	women		boys	girls
Doubles	men	women	mixed	boys	girls
WC Singles	men	women	quad
WC Doubles	men	women	quad
Legends	men	women	seniors
← 1990 ·	Wimbledon Championships	· 1992 →

Michael Stich defeated Boris Becker in the final, 6–4, 7–6^{(7–4)}, 6–4 to win the gentlemen's singles tennis title at the 1991 Wimbledon Championships. It was his first and only major singles title.

Stefan Edberg was the defending champion, but lost in the semifinals to Stich. Stich won the match 4–6, 7–6^{(7–5)}, 7–6^{(7–5)}, 7–6^{(7–2)}. This match was notable for Edberg holding serve in all 23 of his service games during the match, but still losing. Stich's victory prevented Edberg and Becker contesting the final for a fourth straight year.

Future champion Andre Agassi competed in Wimbledon for the first time since 1987, losing in the quarterfinals to David Wheaton. Agassi had previously refused to play Wimbledon from 1988 to 1990, in protest of the All England Club's all-white dress code.

This was the first year in Wimbledon history where there was play on the Middle Sunday, due to bad weather in the first week.

== Seeds ==
1. (Sweden) Stefan Edberg (semifinals)
2. (Germany) Boris Becker (final)
3. (Czechoslovakia) Ivan Lendl (third round)
4. (United States) Jim Courier (quarterfinals)
5. (United States) Andre Agassi (quarterfinals)
6. (Germany) Michael Stich (champion)
7. (France) Guy Forget (quarterfinals)
8. (United States) Pete Sampras (second round)
9. (United States) Michael Chang (first round)
10. (Socialist Federal Republic of Yugoslavia) Goran Ivanišević (second round)
11. (Spain) Emilio Sánchez (first round)
12. (Soviet Union) Andrei Cherkasov (first round)
13. (Switzerland) Jakob Hlasek (second round)
14. (Czechoslovakia) Karel Nováček (fourth round)
15. (United States) Brad Gilbert (third round)
16. (United States) John McEnroe (fourth round)

Click on the seed number of a player to go to their draw section.

== Draw ==
=== Key ===
- Q = Qualifier
- WC = Wild card
- LL = Lucky loser
- Alt = Alternate
- ITF = ITF entry
- PR = Protected ranking
- SR = Special ranking
- SE = Special exempt
- JE = Junior exempt
- JR = Junior Accelerator Programme entrant
- CO = College Accelerator Programme entrant
- NG = Next Gen Accelerator Program entrant
- w/o = Walkover
- r = Retired
- d = Defaulted

=== Finals ===
Quarterfinals
1	(Sweden) Stefan Edberg	6	6	7
(France) Thierry Champion	3	2	5
4	(United States) Jim Courier	3	6^{2}	2
6	(Germany) Michael Stich	6	7^{7}	6
5	(United States) Andre Agassi	2	6	6	6^{3}	2
(United States) David Wheaton	6	0	3	7^{7}	6
7	(France) Guy Forget	7^{7}	6^{3}	2	6^{7}
2	(Germany) Boris Becker	6^{5}	7^{7}	6	7^{9}

Semifinals
1	(Sweden) Stefan Edberg	6	6^{5}	6^{5}	6^{2}
6	(Germany) Michael Stich	4	7^{7}	7^{7}	7^{7}
(United States) David Wheaton	4	6^{4}	5
2	(Germany) Boris Becker	6	7^{7}	7

Final
6	(Germany) Michael Stich	6	7^{7}	6
2	(Germany) Boris Becker	4	6^{4}	4

=== Top half ===
==== Section 1 ====
First round
1	(Sweden) S Edberg	6	6	6
(Switzerland) M Rosset	4	4	4
(Germany) P Baur	6	7^{7}	4	2	3
(United States) D Pate	4	6^{4}	6	6	6
(South Africa) W Ferreira	6	6	6
(Spain) J Aguilera	4	3	3
(South Africa) C van Rensburg	6	7^{7}	4	6
(United States) T Witsken	1	6^{2}	6	4
(France) G Raoux	4	4	3
(Austria) H Skoff	6	6	6
(Germany) A Mronz	4	0	3
(France) J-P Fleurian	6	6	6
Q	(Australia) M Kratzmann	7^{7}	3	7^{7}	6^{7}	4
Q	(Australia) S Stolle	6^{1}	6	6^{4}	7^{9}	6
(Brazil) J Oncins	1	2	4
16	(United States) J McEnroe	6	6	6

Second round
1	(Sweden) S Edberg	6	6	6
(United States) D Pate	2	2	3
(South Africa) W Ferreira	4	5	2
(South Africa) C van Rensburg	6	7	6
(Austria) H Skoff	2	0	3
(France) J-P Fleurian	6	6	6
Q	(Australia) S Stolle	6^{5}	7	0	6^{7}
16	(United States) J McEnroe	7^{7}	5	6	7^{9}

Third round
1	(Sweden) S Edberg	6	6	6
(South Africa) C van Rensburg	1	3	2
(France) J-P Fleurian	2	6^{4}	1
16	(United States) J McEnroe	6	7^{7}	6

Fourth round
1	(Sweden) S Edberg	7^{7}	6	6
16	(United States) J McEnroe	6^{4}	1	4

==== Section 2 ====
First round
10	(Socialist Federal Republic of Yugoslavia) G Ivanišević	7^{9}	7^{7}	6
WC	(United Kingdom) A Castle	6^{7}	6^{5}	2
WC	(United Kingdom) N Brown	6	7	6
Q	(United States) M Keil	4	5	1
(United States) J Tarango	2	3	3
(Australia) P Cash	6	6	6
(France) T Champion	6	6	3	6
WC	(United Kingdom) C Wilkinson	4	2	6	4
WC	(United States) J Connors	6	6	7
(Finland) V Paloheimo	2	0	5
(United States) A Krickstein	6	6	6^{3}	6^{8}	7
(Italy) S Pescosolido	1	3	7^{7}	7^{10}	5
(United States) D Rostagno	6	6	6
(Italy) R Furlan	0	3	4
Q	(Brazil) D Marcelino	1	2	2
8	(United States) P Sampras	6	6	6

Second round
10	(Socialist Federal Republic of Yugoslavia) G Ivanišević	6	3	6^{3}	3
WC	(United Kingdom) N Brown	4	6	7^{7}	6
(Australia) P Cash	5	7^{7}	6	1	10
(France) T Champion	7	6^{5}	4	6	12
WC	(United States) J Connors	6	6	6
(United States) A Krickstein	3	2	3
(United States) D Rostagno	6	3	7^{7}	6
8	(United States) P Sampras	4	6	6^{3}	4

Third round
WC	(United Kingdom) N Brown	6^{1}	6	5	3
(France) T Champion	7^{7}	1	7	6
WC	(United States) J Connors	6^{2}	1	4
(United States) D Rostagno	7^{7}	6	6

Fourth round
(France) T Champion	6^{12}	6	6	3	6
(United States) D Rostagno	7^{14}	2	1	6	3

==== Section 3 ====
First round
4	(United States) J Courier	6	6	7^{7}
(France) R Gilbert	4	2	6^{3}
(Portugal) N Marques	5	7^{7}	4	1
(United States) J Grabb	7	6^{5}	6	6
Q	(Italy) G Pozzi	4	6	6	6
(United States) B Pearce	6	3	2	2
Q	(Australia) B Dyke	3	6^{3}	3
Q	(France) A Boetsch	6	7^{7}	6
(Mexico) L Herrera	6	6	3	3	3
Q	(Argentina) J Frana	3	2	6	6	6
Q	(Brazil) F Roese	3	3	1
(United States) K Curren	6	6	6
(Spain) J Sánchez	6	6	6^{5}	6
Q	(United States) J Kriek	4	4	7^{7}	3
(Germany) U Riglewski	6^{3}	3	4
14	(Czechoslovakia) K Nováček	7^{7}	6	6

Second round
4	(United States) J Courier	6	7^{7}	2	4	6
(United States) J Grabb	4	6^{4}	6	6	3
Q	(Italy) Pozzi	6	6^{7}	6^{7}	4
Q	(France) A Boetsch	4	7^{9}	7^{9}	6
Q	(Argentina) J Frana	7^{7}	6	6
(United States) K Curren	6^{4}	2	2
(Spain) J Sánchez	0	1	6^{2}
14	(Czechoslovakia) K Nováček	6	6	7^{7}

Third round
4	(United States) J Courier	6	6	6
Q	(France) A Boetsch	2	2	0
Q	(Argentina) J Frana	4	4	7	4
14	(Czechoslovakia) K Nováček	6	6	5	6

Fourth round
4	(United States) J Courier	6	6	6
14	(Czechoslovakia) K Nováček	3	4	2

==== Section 4 ====
First round
12	(Soviet Union) A Cherkasov	4	3	4
(United States) R Reneberg	6	6	6
WC	(United Kingdom) D Sapsford	3	6^{4}	6	3
LL	(Canada) M Laurendeau	6	7^{7}	3	6
(Belgium) B Wuyts	1	2	2
(Soviet Union) A Volkov	6	6	6
(Sweden) A Järryd	6	6	3	6
LL	(Sweden) N Kroon	3	4	6	3
(Italy) C Pistolesi	1	3	6	3
(Italy) O Camporese	6	6	2	6
Q	(Canada) G Michibata	5	6	3	7^{7}	6
(Australia) J Stoltenberg	7	4	6	6^{4}	4
LL	(Italy) D Nargiso	6	7^{9}	7^{7}
(Australia) M Woodforde	4	6^{7}	6^{3}
(United States) D Goldie	4	1	2
6	(Germany) M Stich	6	6	6

Second round
(United States) R Reneberg	6	4	7^{7}	4	2
LL	(Canada) M Laurendeau	3	6	6^{4}	6	6
(Soviet Union) A Volkov	6	3	6	3	8
(Sweden) A Järryd	2	6	4	6	6
(Italy) O Camporese	7	6	6
Q	(Canada) G Michibata	5	2	1
LL	(Italy) D Nargiso	3	4	7^{7}	2
6	(Germany) M Stich	6	6	6^{5}	6

Third round
LL	(Canada) M Laurendeau	1	2	1
(Soviet Union) A Volkov	6	6	6
(Italy) O Camporese	6^{0}	2	7^{7}	4
6	(Germany) M Stich	7^{7}	6	6^{4}	6

Fourth round
(Soviet Union) A Volkov	6	3	5	6	5
6	(Germany) M Stich	4	6	7	1	7

=== Bottom half ===
==== Section 5 ====
First round
5	(United States) A Agassi	4	6	6^{6}	7	6
(Canada) G Connell	6	1	7^{8}	5	3
(Socialist Federal Republic of Yugoslavia) G Prpić	6	3	6	3	10
(Netherlands) J Siemerink	4	6	3	6	8
(Sweden) M Larsson	6	1	6	6
(Netherlands) P Haarhuis	4	6	3	1
LL	(Venezuela) M Ruah	7	1	6	3	4
(Netherlands) R Krajicek	5	6	3	6	6
(South Africa) G Muller	6	6	6
(Spain) J Arrese	2	3	3
(United States) S Davis	4	6^{3}	4
(Germany) C Saceanu	6	7^{7}	6
Q	(Czechoslovakia) R Vogel	6^{2}	7^{8}	6^{5}	7^{9}	3
(Netherlands) J Eltingh	7^{7}	6^{6}	7^{7}	6^{7}	6
(United States) P McEnroe	6	7^{7}	6
11	(Spain) E Sánchez	3	6^{4}	1

Second round
5	(United States) A Agassi	7^{7}	3	6	6
(Socialist Federal Republic of Yugoslavia) G Prpić	6^{3}	6	4	2
(Sweden) M Larsson	3	4	3
(Netherlands) R Krajicek	6	6	6
(South Africa) G Muller	6^{6}	4	6	6^{5}
(Germany) C Saceanu	7^{8}	6	3	7^{7}
(Netherlands) J Eltingh	7^{7}	2	1	6	12
(United States) P McEnroe	6^{5}	6	6	4	10

Third round
5	(United States) A Agassi	7^{7}	6	7^{7}
(Netherlands) R Krajicek	6^{5}	3	6^{2}
(Germany) C Saceanu	3	6	4	5
(Netherlands) J Eltingh	6	4	6	7

Fourth round
5	(United States) A Agassi	6	3	6	6
(Netherlands) J Eltingh	3	6	3	4

==== Section 6 ====
First round
13	(Switzerland) J Hlasek	6	3	6	6
Q	(Socialist Federal Republic of Yugoslavia) S Živojinović	2	6	3	2
(Peru) P Arraya	6	2	3	1
(Australia) T Woodbridge	2	6	6	6
(Czechoslovakia) M Vajda	5	3	5
(Sweden) L Jönsson	7	6	7
(Sweden) J Gunnarsson	6	7	6
(Chile) P Rebolledo	1	5	2
(France) C Pioline	4	6	6	7^{7}
Q	(United States) G Layendecker	6	3	4	6^{4}
(United States) D Wheaton	7^{7}	6^{6}	6	6
(Czechoslovakia) P Korda	6^{4}	7^{8}	4	2
(Netherlands) M Koevermans	3	2	1
(United States) M Washington	6	6	6
(New Zealand) K Evernden	2	5	6^{5}
3	(Czechoslovakia) I Lendl	6	7	7^{7}

Second round
13	(Switzerland) J Hlasek	3	6	5	3
(Australia) T Woodbridge	6	1	7	6
(Sweden) L Jönsson	2	3	6	6^{4}
(Sweden) J Gunnarsson	6	6	2	7^{7}
(France) C Pioline	4	7^{7}	3	3
(United States) D Wheaton	6	6^{5}	6	6
(United States) M Washington	6	6	4	4	5
3	(Czechoslovakia) I Lendl	4	2	6	6	7

Third round
(Australia) T Woodbridge	6^{4}	6	3	4
(Sweden) J Gunnarsson	7^{7}	4	6	6
(United States) D Wheaton	6	3	7^{8}	6
3	(Czechoslovakia) I Lendl	3	6	6^{6}	3

Fourth round
(Sweden) J Gunnarsson	4	3	1
(United States) D Wheaton	6	6	6

==== Section 7 ====
First round
7	(France) G Forget	2	7^{7}	7	6^{4}	6
(Israel) G Bloom	6	6^{2}	5	7^{7}	4
(Sweden) M Gustafsson	7^{7}	6	6
(Spain) F Clavet	6^{5}	3	3
(France) H Leconte	6	6	7^{7}
(Spain) T Carbonell	3	1	6^{2}
(Sweden) N Kulti	2	5	7	1
(Peru) J Yzaga	6	7	5	6
WC	(United Kingdom) M Petchey	4	4	6	6	8
WC	(United States) J Pugh	6	6	3	3	6
(Germany) P Kühnen	6	6	6
(Finland) A Rahunen	4	3	4
WC	(United Kingdom) J Bates	6	6	6
(Spain) JF Altur	4	4	2
(United States) T Mayotte	6^{6}	4	6	7^{11}	6
9	(United States) M Chang	7^{8}	6	1	6^{9}	2

Second round
7	(France) G Forget	6	6	6
(Sweden) M Gustafsson	4	3	4
(France) H Leconte	6	6	6
(Peru) J Yzaga	4	2	3
WC	(United Kingdom) M Petchey	2	4	3
(Germany) P Kühnen	6	6	6
WC	(United Kingdom) J Bates	3	6	4	6^{2}
(United States) T Mayotte	6	3	6	7^{7}

Third round
7	(France) G Forget	3	4	6	4
(France) H Leconte	6	6	1	1^{r}
(Germany) P Kühnen	6	2	6^{4}	4
(United States) T Mayotte	3	6	7^{7}	6

Fourth round
7	(France) G Forget	6^{4}	7	6	6
(United States) T Mayotte	7^{7}	5	2	4

==== Section 8 ====
First round
15	(United States) B Gilbert	7	6	6
Q	(Argentina) D Orsanic	5	1	2
(Australia) W Masur	6	1	7^{7}	6
(Israel) A Mansdorf	3	6	6^{3}	4
Q	(Sweden) H Holm	7^{7}	6	6
(Italy) C Caratti	6^{3}	3	4
(Belgium) E Masso	1	5	3
(Sweden) C Bergström	6	7	6
(Japan) S Matsuoka	4	6	7^{10}	5	5
(Brazil) L Mattar	6	4	6^{8}	7	7
LL	(Soviet Union) A Olhovskiy	3	6	6	7^{7}
(Germany) E Jelen	6	3	3	6^{4}
(Australia) R Fromberg	4	6^{6}	2
(Sweden) P Lundgren	6	7^{8}	6
(Germany) C-U Steeb	4	2	4
2	(Germany) B Becker	6	6	6

Second round
15	(United States) B Gilbert	7	2	6	5	6
(Australia) W Masur	5	6	3	7	4
Q	(Sweden) H Holm	5	0	4
(Sweden) C Bergström	7	6	6
(Brazil) L Mattar	6	6^{3}	4	6	3
LL	(Soviet Union) A Olhovskiy	2	7^{7}	6	4	6
(Sweden) P Lundgren	6^{3}	5	5
2	(Germany) B Becker	7^{7}	7	7

Third round
15	(United States) B Gilbert	3	2	6	3
(Sweden) C Bergström	6	6	3	6
LL	(Soviet Union) A Olhovskiy	1	4	6	3
2	(Germany) B Becker	6	6	3	6

Fourth round
(Sweden) C Bergström	4	7^{7}	1	6^{2}
2	(Germany) B Becker	6	6^{4}	6	7^{7}

Preceded by 1991 French Open – Men's singles	Grand Slam men's singles	Succeeded by 1991 US Open – Men's singles
