= Petr Korda =

Czech tennis player (born 1968)

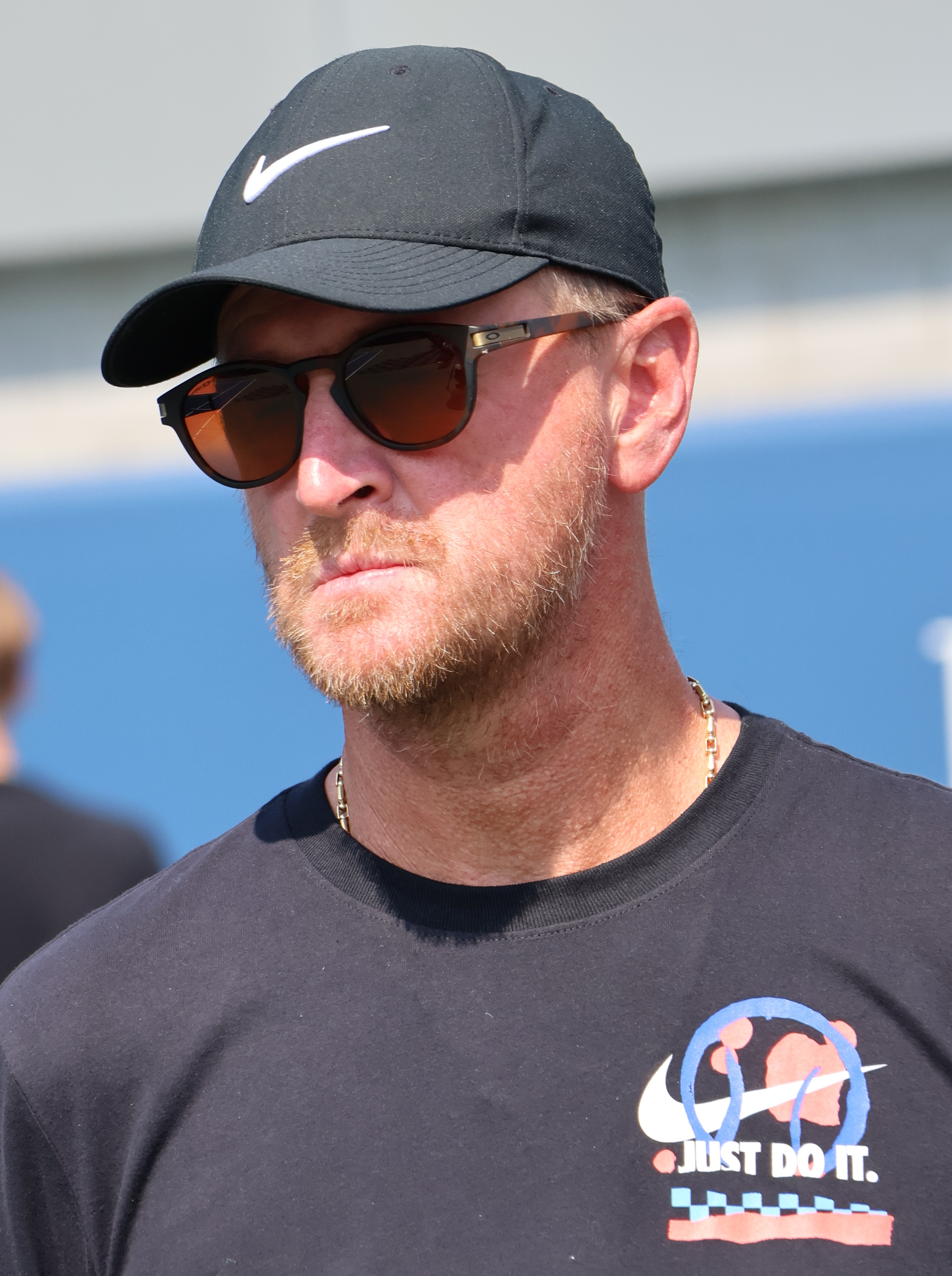
- Korda in 2024
- Country (sports): Czechoslovakia (1987–1992); Czech Republic
- Residence: Monte Carlo, Monaco & Bradenton, Florida
- Born: 23 January 1968 (age 58) Prague, Czechoslovakia
- Height: 1.90 m (6 ft 3 in)
- Turned pro: 1987
- Retired: 2005
- Plays: Left-handed (one-handed backhand)
- Prize money: $10,448,900

Singles
- Career record: 410–248 (62.3%)
- Career titles: 10
- Highest ranking: No. 2 (2 February 1998)

Grand Slam singles results
- Australian Open: W (1998)
- French Open: F (1992)
- Wimbledon: QF (1998)
- US Open: QF (1995, 1997)

Other tournaments
- Tour Finals: RR (1992)
- Grand Slam Cup: W (1993)

Doubles
- Career record: 234–160 (59.4%)
- Career titles: 10
- Highest ranking: No. 10 (11 June 1990)

Grand Slam doubles results
- Australian Open: W (1996)
- French Open: F (1990)
- Wimbledon: 2R (1990, 1991)
- US Open: 3R (1989, 1991, 1995)

Team competitions
- Davis Cup: SF (1996)
- Hopman Cup: W (1994)
- Last updated on: July 1999.

Petr Korda (born 23 January 1968) is a Czech former professional tennis player. He was ranked world No. 2 in men's singles by the Association of Tennis Professionals (ATP) in February 1998. Korda won ten singles titles, including the 1998 Australian Open, and was the runner-up at the 1992 French Open. Korda tested positive for nandrolone in July 1998 at Wimbledon, and was banned from September 1999 for 12 months, retiring from the sport shortly before the ban. He is the father of professional golfers Jessica Korda and Nelly Korda, and of professional tennis player Sebastian Korda.

== Tennis career ==
=== Juniors ===
Korda first came to the tennis world's attention as a promising junior player. In 1985, he partnered with fellow Czech Cyril Suk to win the boys' doubles title at the French Open. Korda and Suk ranked the joint-World No. 1 junior doubles players that year.

Junior Slam results:

- Australian Open: -
- French Open: 3R (1986)
- Wimbledon: QF (1986)
- US Open: QF (1986)

=== Professional career ===
Korda turned professional in 1987. He won his first career doubles title in 1988, and his first top-level singles title in 1991. Korda was involved in four Grand Slam finals during his career – two in singles and two in doubles. Korda also was known for the "Scissors Kick" which he would do at midcourt after winning matches.

In 1990, Korda and Goran Ivanišević finished runners-up in the men's doubles at the French Open, and as a result, Korda reached his career-high doubles ranking of world No. 10. In 1992, he rose to the men's singles final at the French Open beating Christian Bergström, Shuzo Matsuoka, Michiel Schapers, Jaime Oncins, Andrei Cherkasov and Henri Leconte, before he was defeated in straight sets by defending champion Jim Courier 7–5, 6–2, 6–1.

A highlight of Korda's career include winning the Grand Slam Cup in 1993, with five-set wins in the semifinal and final over Pete Sampras and Michael Stich, the number 1 and 2 tennis players in the world at that time. Korda also was a part of the Czech Republic's team which won the Hopman Cup in 1994. In 1996 he teamed-up with Stefan Edberg to win the men's doubles title at the Australian Open. He also upset the defending champion, Pete Sampras, in five sets in the fourth round of the 1997 US Open.

The crowning moment of Korda's career came in 1998, when he defeated Albert Portas, Scott Draper, Vincent Spadea, Cédric Pioline, Jonas Björkman and Karol Kučera to face Marcelo Ríos in the men's singles final at the Australian Open. Korda dominated the match from start to finish by winning in straight sets 6–2, 6–2, 6–2 and claimed his first Grand Slam singles title in just 1 hour and 25 minutes. The win propelled him to his career-high singles ranking of World No. 2. At four tournaments in 1998, Korda had the world No. 1 ranking in his sights, but he lost to Karol Kučera in Antwerp, Marcelo Ríos at Indian Wells, Tim Henman in Miami and Richard Krajicek in Monte Carlo.

==== Suspension and retirement ====
Following his quarterfinal match against Tim Henman at the Wimbledon 1998, Korda tested positive for the banned steroid nandrolone. This came to light in December 1998 when the appeals board of the International Tennis Federation (ITF) accepted his denial of intent and agreed not to ban him, instead merely withholding his Wimbledon prize money and ranking points. The ensuing controversy caused the ITF to launch an appeal against its own decision at the Court of Arbitration for Sport (CAS). In January 1999 Korda obtained a ruling in the High Court of England and Wales that the ITF could not appeal, but the High Court ruling was overturned by the Court of Appeal. In July 1999 the CAS allowed the ITF appeal and on 1 September 1999 the ITF banned Korda for 12 months and stripped him of all prize money and ranking points since the failed test.

Before the ban, Korda had already announced his retirement, after losing to Danny Sapsford and failing to qualify for Wimbledon 1999. However, after his ban he competed in Czech ATP Challenger Tour events: the Prague Open (singles and doubles) in December 2000 and the Czech Open (doubles) in 2001 and 2005.

== Personal life ==
Korda married Regina Rajchrtová, a former professional tennis player from Czechoslovakia. They have two daughters and a son. The oldest, Jessica, was born on 27 February 1993; she is a professional golfer, and finished 19th in the 2008 U.S. Women's Open as a 15-year-old, with Korda as her caddy. He later caddied at the 2013 U.S. Women's Open for his other daughter, Nelly, who is also a professional golfer.

Korda's son, Sebastian, is a professional tennis player.

== Career statistics ==
=== Grand Slam performance timelines ===
==== Singles ====
Tournament	1988	1989	1990	1991	1992	1993	1994	1995	1996	1997	1998	1999	SR	W–L
Australian Open	A	A	2R	2R	1R	QF	1R	3R	1R	1R	W	3R	1 / 10	17–9
French Open	2R	A	2R	2R	F	2R	1R	1R	3R	4R	1R	2R	0 / 11	15–11
Wimbledon	3R	A	1R	1R	2R	4R	2R	4R	A	4R	QF	Q2	0 / 9	17–9
US Open	1R	A	2R	1R	1R	1R	A	QF	3R	QF	1R	A	0 / 9	11–9
Win–loss	3–3	0–0	3–4	2–4	7–4	8–4	1–3	9–4	4–3	9–4	11–3	3–2	1 / 39	60–38

==== Doubles ====
Tournament	1987	1988	1989	1990	1991	1992	1993	1994	1995	1996	1997	SR	W–L
Australian Open	A	A	A	2R	1R	2R	1R	3R	SF	W	2R	1 / 8	15–7
French Open	1R	2R	2R	F	2R	QF	SF	A	1R	3R	3R	0 / 10	19–10
Wimbledon	A	1R	A	2R	2R	1R	A	A	A	A	A	0 / 4	2–4
US Open	A	A	3R	2R	3R	1R	A	A	3R	1R	1R	0 / 7	7–7
Win–loss	0–1	1–2	3–2	8–4	4–4	4–4	4–2	2–1	6–3	8–2	3–3	1 / 29	43–28

=== Grand Slam tournament finals ===
==== Singles: 2 (1 title, 1 runner-up) ====
Result	Year	Championship	Surface	Opponent	Score
Loss	1992	French Open	Clay	(United States) Jim Courier	5–7, 2–6, 1–6
Win	1998	Australian Open	Hard	(Chile) Marcelo Ríos	6–2, 6–2, 6–2

==== Doubles: 2 (1 title, 1 runner-up) ====
Result	Year	Championship	Surface	Partner	Opponents	Score
Loss	1990	French Open	Clay	(Socialist Federal Republic of Yugoslavia) Goran Ivanišević	(Spain) Sergio Casal (Spain) Emilio Sánchez Vicario	5–7, 3–6
Win	1996	Australian Open	Hard	(Sweden) Stefan Edberg	(Canada) Sébastien Lareau (United States) Alex O'Brien	7–5, 7–5, 4–6, 6–1

=== Grand Slam Cup ===
==== Singles: 1 (1–0) ====
Result	Year	Championship	Surface	Opponent	Score
Win	1993	Grand Slam Cup, Munich	Carpet (i)	(Germany) Michael Stich	2–6, 6–4, 7–6^{(7–5)}, 2–6, 11–9

=== Masters Series finals ===
==== Singles: 3 (1–2) ====
Result	Year	Tournament	Surface	Opponent	Score
Loss	1991	Canada Masters	Hard	(Soviet Union) Andrei Chesnokov	6–3, 4–6, 3–6
Loss	1994	Indian Wells Masters	Hard	(United States) Pete Sampras	6–4, 3–6, 6–3, 3–6, 2–6
Win	1997	Stuttgart Masters	Carpet (i)	(Netherlands) Richard Krajicek	7–6^{(8–6)}, 6–2, 6–4

==== Doubles: 4 (3–1) ====
Result	Year	Tournament	Surface	Partner	Opponent	Score
Win	1990	Monte-Carlo Masters	Clay	(Czechoslovakia) Tomáš Šmíd	(Ecuador) Andrés Gómez (Spain) Javier Sánchez	6–4, 7–6
Loss	1992	Monte-Carlo Masters	Clay	(Czechoslovakia) Karel Nováček	(Germany) Boris Becker (Germany) Michael Stich	4–6, 4–6
Win	1993	Monte-Carlo Masters	Clay	(Sweden) Stefan Edberg	(Netherlands) Paul Haarhuis (Netherlands) Mark Koevermans	3–6, 6–2, 7–6
Win	1993	Cincinnati Masters	Hard	(United States) Andre Agassi	(Sweden) Stefan Edberg (Sweden) Henrik Holm	7–6, 6–4
