= 1991 Wimbledon Championships – Men's doubles =

Men's doubles
- 1991 Wimbledon Championships

Final
- Champions: (Australia) John Fitzgerald (Sweden) Anders Järryd
- Runners-up: (Argentina) Javier Frana (Mexico) Leonardo Lavalle
- Score: 6–3, 6–4, 6–7^{(7–9)}, 6–1

Details
- Draw: 64 (5 Q / 5 WC )
- Seeds: 16

Events
Singles	men	women		boys	girls
Doubles	men	women	mixed	boys	girls
WC Singles	men	women	quad
WC Doubles	men	women	quad
Legends	men	women	seniors
← 1990 ·	Wimbledon Championships	· 1992 →

John Fitzgerald and Anders Järryd defeated Javier Frana and Leonardo Lavalle in the final, 6–3, 6–4, 6–7^{(7–9)}, 6–1 to win the gentlemen's doubles title at the 1991 Wimbledon Championships. It was Fitzgerald and Järryd's third Wimbledon final in four years.

Rick Leach and Jim Pugh were the defending champions, but lost in the first round to Goran Ivanišević and John McEnroe.

== Seeds ==
1. (United States) Scott Davis / (United States) David Pate (third round)
2. (Australia) John Fitzgerald / (Sweden) Anders Järryd (champions)
3. (United States) Rick Leach / (United States) Jim Pugh (first round)
4. (Canada) Grant Connell / (Canada) Glenn Michibata (semifinals)
5. (South Africa) Gary Muller / (South Africa) Danie Visser (second round)
6. n/a
7. (United States) Patrick Galbraith / (United States) Todd Witsken (quarterfinals)
8. (Australia) Todd Woodbridge / (Australia) Mark Woodforde (quarterfinals)
9. (Germany) Udo Riglewski / (Germany) Michael Stich (first round)
10. (United States) Luke Jensen / (Australia) Laurie Warder (second round)
11. (United States) Kelly Jones / (Mexico) Jorge Lozano (second round)
12. (Netherlands) Paul Haarhuis / (Netherlands) Mark Koevermans (third round)
13. (United States) Jim Grabb / (United States) Patrick McEnroe (first round)
14. (United Kingdom) Neil Broad / (United States) Kevin Curren (first round)
15. (South Africa) Wayne Ferreira / (South Africa) Piet Norval (semifinals)
16. (Australia) Broderick Dyke / (Sweden) Peter Lundgren (first round)

Click on the seed number of a player to go to their draw section.

== Draw ==
=== Key ===
- Q = Qualifier
- WC = Wild card
- LL = Lucky loser
- Alt = Alternate
- ITF = ITF entry
- PR = Protected ranking
- SR = Special ranking
- SE = Special exempt
- JE = Junior exempt
- JR = Junior Accelerator Programme entrant
- CO = College Accelerator Programme entrant
- NG = Next Gen Accelerator Program entrant
- w/o = Walkover
- r = Retired
- d = Defaulted

=== Finals ===
Quarterfinals
15	(South Africa) Wayne Ferreira (South Africa) Piet Norval	7^{7}	6	6
8	(Australia) Todd Woodbridge (Australia) Mark Woodforde	6^{3}	4	4
(United States) Paul Annacone (New Zealand) Kelly Evernden	4	4	5
(Argentina) Javier Frana (Mexico) Leonardo Lavalle	6	6	7
(Argentina) Pablo Albano (United States) Shelby Cannon	7	6	6^{5}	6^{9}	8
4	(Canada) Grant Connell (Canada) Glenn Michibata	5	2	7^{7}	7^{11}	10
7	(United States) Patrick Galbraith (United States) Todd Witsken	4	0	4
2	(Australia) John Fitzgerald (Sweden) Anders Järryd	6	6	6

Semifinals
15	(South Africa) Wayne Ferreira (South Africa) Piet Norval	2	4	6^{4}
(Argentina) Javier Frana (Mexico) Leonardo Lavalle	6	6	7^{7}
4	(Canada) Grant Connell (Canada) Glenn Michibata	2	7^{7}	6^{5}	4
2	(Australia) John Fitzgerald (Sweden) Anders Järryd	6	6^{4}	7^{7}	6

Final
(Argentina) Javier Frana (Mexico) Leonardo Lavalle	3	4	7^{9}	1
2	(Australia) John Fitzgerald (Sweden) Anders Järryd	6	6	6^{7}	6

=== Top half ===
==== Section 1 ====
First round
1	(United States) S Davis (United States) D Pate	6	6
(Venezuela) A Mora (Sweden) T Svantesson	4	4
(Czechoslovakia) V Flégl (Socialist Federal Republic of Yugoslavia) G Prpić	2	3
Q	(Sweden) H Holm (Sweden) P Nyborg	6	6
WC	(United Kingdom) S Botfield (United Kingdom) J Turner	7^{7}	7^{7}
(Netherlands) H Davids (Netherlands) J Siemerink	6^{4}	6^{4}
(Netherlands) M Oosting (Kenya) P Wekesa	6^{5}	5
15	(South Africa) W Ferreira (South Africa) P Norval	7^{7}	7
9	(Germany) U Riglewski (Germany) M Stich	6^{4}	3
Q	(South Africa) B Haygarth (South Africa) B Talbot	7^{7}	6
(United States) S DeVries (Australia) D Macpherson	6	7
(Brazil) L Mattar (Brazil) J Oncins	3	5
(United States) S Patridge (United States) J Rive	3	6	6
WC	(United Kingdom) D Ison (United Kingdom) M Petchey	6	3	4
(Italy) F Mordegan (Czechoslovakia) R Vogel	4	3
8	(Australia) T Woodbridge (Australia) M Woodforde	6	6

Second round
1	(United States) S Davis (United States) D Pate	6	7^{7}
Q	(Sweden) H Holm (Sweden) P Nyborg	3	6^{2}
WC	(United Kingdom) S Botfield (United Kingdom) J Turner	5	3
15	(South Africa) W Ferreira (South Africa) P Norval	7	6
Q	(South Africa) B Haygarth (South Africa) B Talbot	6	6
(United States) S DeVries (Australia) D Macpherson	4	4
WC	(United States) S Patridge (United States) J Rive	4	4
8	(Australia) T Woodbridge (Australia) M Woodforde	6	6

Third round
1	(United States) S Davis (United States) D Pate	6^{2}	7	7
15	(South Africa) W Ferreira (South Africa) P Norval	7^{7}	5	9
Q	(South Africa) B Haygarth (South Africa) B Talbot	2	3
8	(Australia) T Woodbridge (Australia) M Woodforde	6	6

Quarterfinals
15	(South Africa) W Ferreira (South Africa) P Norval	7^{7}	6	6
8	(Australia) T Woodbridge (Australia) M Woodforde	6^{3}	4	4

==== Section 2 ====
First round
3	(United States) R Leach (United States) J Pugh	3	4
WC	(Socialist Federal Republic of Yugoslavia) G Ivanišević (United States) J McEnroe	6	6
(United States) J Courier (United States) D Flach	6	6
(Soviet Union) A Olhovskiy (Belgium) L Pimek	3	3
(United States) P Annacone (New Zealand) K Evernden	6^{5}	7^{7}	6
(Czechoslovakia) K Nováček (Czechoslovakia) T Šmíd	7^{7}	6^{5}	3
Q	(Zimbabwe) B Black (United States) TJ Middleton	3	6	6
13	(United States) J Grabb (United States) P McEnroe	6	3	3
12	(Netherlands) P Haarhuis (Netherlands) M Koevermans	6	7^{7}
(Netherlands) M Schapers (The Bahamas) R Smith	1	6^{0}
(United States) G Layendecker (United States) R Reneberg	6	5	6
(United States) T Nelson (United States) B Shelton	2	7	2
(Spain) M Aurelio Górriz (Spain) F Roig	2	2
(Argentina) J Frana (Mexico) L Lavalle	6	6
(Brazil) N Aerts (United States) R Van't Hof	3	4
5	(South Africa) G Muller (South Africa) D Visser	6	6

Second round
WC	(Socialist Federal Republic of Yugoslavia) G Ivanišević (United States) J McEnroe	6	6^{2}	4
(United States) J Courier (United States) D Flach	3	7^{7}	6
(United States) P Annacone (New Zealand) K Evernden	6	7
Q	(Zimbabwe) B Black (United States) TJ Middleton	3	5
12	(Netherlands) P Haarhuis (Netherlands) M Koevermans	7^{9}	6
Q	(United States) G Layendecker (United States) R Reneberg	6^{7}	3
(Argentina) J Frana (Mexico) L Lavalle	7^{8}	6
5	(South Africa) G Muller (South Africa) D Visser	6^{6}	3

Third round
(United States) J Courier (United States) D Flach	2	6^{2}
(United States) P Annacone (New Zealand) K Evernden	6	7^{7}
12	(Netherlands) P Haarhuis (Netherlands) M Koevermans	3	4
(Argentina) J Frana (Mexico) L Lavalle	6	6

Quarterfinals
(United States) P Annacone (New Zealand) K Evernden	4	4	5
(Argentina) J Frana (Mexico) L Lavalle	6	6	7

=== Bottom half ===
==== Section 3 ====
First round
LL	(South Africa) D Adams (Soviet Union) Ģ Dzelde	6	6
(United States) K Kinnear (United States) S Salumaa	3	4
(United States) J Brown (United States) B Garnett	6	6^{8}	6
(Italy) M Boscatto (Italy) S Pescosolido	3	7^{10}	4
(Argentina) P Albano (United States) S Cannon	3	6	6
(Italy) D Nargiso (Spain) J Sánchez	6	3	4
(United Kingdom) J Bates (United Kingdom) N Brown	3	5
11	(United States) K Jones (Mexico) J Lozano	6	7
14	(United Kingdom) N Broad (United States) K Curren	4	3
(Netherlands) R Krajicek (Czechoslovakia) D Vacek	6	6
(United States) K Flach (United States) R Seguso	7^{7}	6
(Sweden) R Båthman (Sweden) R Bergh	6^{3}	4
(Spain) T Carbonell (Czechoslovakia) P Korda	6	6
(United States) C Beckman (United States) S Melville	2	4
(United Kingdom) A Castle (United States) G Van Emburgh	4	2
4	(Canada) G Connell (Canada) G Michibata	6	6

Second round
LL	(South Africa) D Adams (Soviet Union) Ģ Dzelde	6	4
(United States) J Brown (United States) B Garnett	7	6
(Argentina) P Albano (United States) S Cannon	6	6
11	(United States) K Jones (Mexico) J Lozano	3	3
(Netherlands) R Krajicek (Czechoslovakia) D Vacek	6^{6}	3
(United States) K Flach (United States) R Seguso	7^{8}	6
(Spain) T Carbonell (Czechoslovakia) P Korda	4	5
4	(Canada) G Connell (Canada) G Michibata	6	7

Third round
(United States) J Brown (United States) B Garnett	6^{3}	3
(Argentina) P Albano (United States) S Cannon	7	6
(United States) K Flach (United States) R Seguso	4	6^{0}
4	(Canada) G Connell (Canada) G Michibata	6	7^{7}

Quarterfinals
(Argentina) P Albano (United States) S Cannon	7	6	6^{5}	6^{9}	8
4	(Canada) G Connell (Canada) G Michibata	5	2	7^{7}	7^{11}	10

==== Section 4 ====
First round
7	(United States) P Galbraith (United States) T Witsken	7	6
(Iran) M Bahrami (France) R Gilbert	5	3
(South Africa) S Kruger (South Africa) C van Rensburg	3	3
(United States) B Garrow (United States) B Pearce	6	6
(Netherlands) T Nijssen (Czechoslovakia) C Suk	6	6
Q	(Canada) M Laurendeau (Brazil) F Roese	4	4
(Israel) G Bloom (Australia) P Doohan	4	4
10	(United States) L Jensen (Australia) L Warder	6	6
16	(Australia) B Dyke (Sweden) P Lundgren	4	4
WC	(United Kingdom) N Fulwood (United Kingdom) D Sapsford	6	6
WC	(United Kingdom) P Hand (United Kingdom) C Wilkinson	6^{4}	3
(Australia) M Kratzmann (Australia) S Youl	7^{7}	6
Q	(Australia) N Borwick (Australia) A Kratzmann	1	2
(Argentina) G Luza (Brazil) C Motta	6	6
(Australia) W Masur (Australia) J Stoltenberg	3	4
2	(Australia) J Fitzgerald (Sweden) A Järryd	6	6

Second round
7	(United States) P Galbraith (United States) T Witsken	6^{2}	6	6
(United States) B Garrow (United States) B Pearce	7^{7}	4	3
(Netherlands) T Nijssen (Czechoslovakia) C Suk	7	3	7
10	(United States) L Jensen (Australia) L Warder	5	6	5
WC	(United Kingdom) N Fulwood (United Kingdom) D Sapsford	3	4
(Australia) M Kratzmann (Australia) S Youl	6	6
(Argentina) G Luza (Brazil) C Motta	4	6^{4}
2	(Australia) J Fitzgerald (Sweden) A Järryd	6	7^{7}

Third round
7	(United States) P Galbraith (United States) T Witsken	6	4	13
(Netherlands) T Nijssen (Czechoslovakia) C Suk	4	6	11
(Australia) M Kratzmann (Australia) S Youl	6^{3}	4
2	(Australia) J Fitzgerald (Sweden) A Järryd	7^{7}	6

Quarterfinals
7	(United States) P Galbraith (United States) T Witsken	4	0	4
2	(Australia) J Fitzgerald (Sweden) A Järryd	6	6	6
