= 1991 Wimbledon Championships – Mixed doubles =

Mixed doubles
- 1991 Wimbledon Championships

Final
- Champions: (Australia) John Fitzgerald (Australia) Elizabeth Smylie
- Runners-up: (United States) Jim Pugh (Soviet Union) Natasha Zvereva
- Score: 7–6^{(7–4)}, 6–2

Details
- Draw: 64 (3 Q / 5 WC )
- Seeds: 16

Events
Singles	men	women		boys	girls
Doubles	men	women	mixed	boys	girls
WC Singles	men	women	quad
WC Doubles	men	women	quad
Legends	men	women	seniors
← 1990 ·	Wimbledon Championships	· 1992 →

Rick Leach and Zina Garrison were the defending champions but lost in the second round to Michiel Schapers and Brenda Schultz.

John Fitzgerald and Elizabeth Smylie defeated Jim Pugh and Natasha Zvereva in the final, 7–6^{(7–4)}, 6–2 to win the mixed doubles tennis title at the 1991 Wimbledon Championships.

== Seeds ==
1. (United States) Jim Pugh / (Soviet Union) Natasha Zvereva (final)
2. (Australia) John Fitzgerald / (Australia) Elizabeth Smylie (champions)
3. (United States) Scott Davis / (United States) Robin White (first round)
4. (United States) Rick Leach / (United States) Zina Garrison (second round)
5. (United States) Patrick Galbraith / (United States) Patty Fendick (first round)
6. (Canada) Glenn Michibata / (Canada) Jill Hetherington (quarterfinals)
7. (United States) David Wheaton / (United States) Mary Joe Fernández (withdrew)
8. (Canada) Grant Connell / (United States) Kathy Rinaldi (semifinals)
9. (Australia) Todd Woodbridge / (Australia) Nicole Provis (third round)
10. (South Africa) Danie Visser / (South Africa) Rosalyn Fairbank-Nideffer (second round)
11. (United States) Ken Flach / (United States) Kathy Jordan (second round)
12. (Mexico) Jorge Lozano / (Spain) Arantxa Sánchez Vicario (second round)
13. (Czechoslovakia) Cyril Suk / (Czechoslovakia) Helena Suková (third round)
14. (United States) Jim Grabb / (United States) Elise Burgin (first round)
15. (South Africa) Wayne Ferreira / (South Africa) Lise Gregory (first round)
16. (Australia) Mark Kratzmann / (United States) Pam Shriver (second round)

Click on the seed number of a player to go to their draw section.

== Draw ==
=== Key ===
- Q = Qualifier
- WC = Wild card
- LL = Lucky loser
- Alt = Alternate
- SE = Special exempt
- PR = Protected ranking
- ITF = ITF entry
- JE = Junior exempt
- w/o = Walkover
- r = Retired
- d = Defaulted
- SR = Special ranking

=== Finals ===
Quarterfinals
1	(United States) Jim Pugh (Soviet Union) Natasha Zvereva	6	6
6	(Canada) Glenn Michibata (Canada) Jill Hetherington	4	3
(Australia) Broderick Dyke (Australia) Michelle Jaggard	4	4
8	(Canada) Grant Connell (United States) Kathy Rinaldi	6	6
WC	(South Africa) Christo van Rensburg (South Africa) Elna Reinach	7^{7}	7^{7}
(Netherlands) Michiel Schapers (Netherlands) Brenda Schultz	6^{5}	6^{5}
(Australia) Jason Stoltenberg (Australia) Rennae Stubbs	4	2
2	(Australia) John Fitzgerald (Australia) Elizabeth Smylie	6	6

Semifinals
1	(United States) Jim Pugh (Soviet Union) Natasha Zvereva	7	6
8	(Canada) Grant Connell (United States) Kathy Rinaldi	5	2
WC	(South Africa) Christo van Rensburg (South Africa) Elna Reinach	5	6	5
2	(Australia) John Fitzgerald (Australia) Elizabeth Smylie	7	3	7

Final
1	(United States) Jim Pugh (Soviet Union) Natasha Zvereva	6^{4}	2
2	(Australia) John Fitzgerald (Australia) Elizabeth Smylie	7^{7}	6

=== Top half ===
==== Section 1 ====
First round
1	(United States) J Pugh (Soviet Union) N Zvereva	6	6
(United Kingdom) N Brown (United Kingdom) C Wood	2	3
(New Zealand) K Evernden (Australia) R McQuillan	3	6	6
Q	(Australia) S Stolle (France) N van Lottum	6	3	4
(United Kingdom) J Bates (United Kingdom) J Durie	6	6
(United Kingdom) N Broad (Germany) E Pfaff	3	2
LL	(Australia) J Morgan (Australia) D Jones	5	3
12	(Mexico) J Lozano (Spain) A Sánchez Vicario	7	6
15	(South Africa) W Ferreira (South Africa) L Gregory	6	4	12
(United States) K Kinnear (United States) C Benjamin	2	6	14
(United States) C Beckman (United States) M Louie Harper	1	2
(France) H Leconte (Germany) S Graf	6	6
(South Africa) P Norval (Netherlands) M Bollegraf	4	6	6
WC	(United Kingdom) M Petchey (United Kingdom) S Loosemore	6	4	1
Q	(United States) E Amend (United States) H Ludloff	4	7^{7}	7
6	(Canada) G Michibata (Canada) J Hetherington	6	6^{2}	9

Second round
1	(United States) J Pugh (Soviet Union) N Zvereva	2	6	6
(New Zealand) K Evernden (Australia) R McQuillan	6	3	4
(United Kingdom) J Bates (United Kingdom) J Durie	6	6
12	(Mexico) J Lozano (Spain) A Sánchez Vicario	4	4
(United States) K Kinnear (United States) C Benjamin	2	5
(France) H Leconte (Germany) S Graf	6	7
(South Africa) P Norval (Netherlands) M Bollegraf	6^{5}	6^{4}
6	(Canada) G Michibata (Canada) J Hetherington	7^{7}	7^{7}

Third round
1	(United States) J Pugh (Soviet Union) N Zvereva	7	6
(United Kingdom) J Bates (United Kingdom) J Durie	5	4
(France) H Leconte (Germany) S Graf	4	6^{4}
6	(Canada) G Michibata (Canada) J Hetherington	6	7^{7}

Quarterfinals
1	(United States) J Pugh (Soviet Union) N Zvereva	6	6
6	(Canada) G Michibata (Canada) J Hetherington	4	3

==== Section 2 ====
First round
3	(United States) S Davis (United States) R White	3	4
(United States) J Canter (United States) A May	6	6
(Netherlands) M Koevermans (Netherlands) H ter Riet	4	6	6
(Australia) D Macpherson (Australia) K Godridge	6	3	4
(South Africa) B Talbot (New Zealand) B Cordwell	7^{7}	6^{7}	6
(United States) S Melville (United States) E Somerville	6^{3}	7^{9}	1
(Australia) B Dyke (Australia) M Jaggard	6	6
14	(United States) J Grabb (United States) E Burgin	3	3
9	(Australia) T Woodbridge (Australia) N Provis	6	6
(United States) T Nelson (United States) G Magers	2	2
WC	(United Kingdom) N Fulwood (United Kingdom) S Gomer	5	5
(The Bahamas) R Smith (France) C Suire	7	7
WC	(United States) R Seguso (Canada) C Bassett-Seguso	2	6	7
(Italy) U Colombini (Italy) L Golarsa	6	4	9
(United States) K Thorne (Indonesia) S Wibowo	4	3
8	(Canada) G Connell (United States) K Rinaldi	6	6

Second round
(United States) J Canter (United States) A May	5	7^{9}	4
(Netherlands) M Koevermans (Netherlands) H ter Riet	7	6^{7}	6
(South Africa) B Talbot (New Zealand) B Cordwell	4	7^{8}	3
(Australia) B Dyke (Australia) M Jaggard	6	6^{6}	6
9	(Australia) T Woodbridge (Australia) N Provis	7	6
(The Bahamas) R Smith (France) C Suire	5	3
(Italy) U Colombini (Italy) L Golarsa	7	1	4
8	(Canada) G Connell (United States) K Rinaldi	5	6	6

Third round
(Netherlands) M Koevermans (Netherlands) H ter Riet	2	3
(Australia) B Dyke (Australia) M Jaggard	6	6
9	(Australia) T Woodbridge (Australia) N Provis	7	6^{3}	4
8	(Canada) G Connell (United States) K Rinaldi	5	7^{7}	6

Quarterfinals
(Australia) B Dyke (Australia) M Jaggard	4	4
8	(Canada) G Connell (United States) K Rinaldi	6	6

=== Bottom half ===
==== Section 3 ====
First round
5	(United States) P Galbraith (United States) P Fendick	1	6	4
LL	(Australia) M Woodforde (United States) A Frazier	6	1	6
(United States) J Brown (United States) S Stafford	2	6	3
WC	(South Africa) C van Rensburg (South Africa) E Reinach	6	2	6
(Australia) N Borwick (Australia) A Scott	6	3	10
(Netherlands) J Siemerink (Netherlands) C Vis	4	6	12
(Australia) S Youl (Australia) L Field	1	2
16	(Australia) M Kratzmann (United States) P Shriver	6	6
11	(United States) K Flach (United States) K Jordan	7^{7}	6
(United States) S Cannon (United States) K Adams	6^{5}	4
(United States) R Van't Hof (United States) C MacGregor	6	1	9
(United States) S Salumaa (Luxembourg) K Kschwendt	4	6	11
(Netherlands) M Schapers (Netherlands) B Schultz	6	5	29
(Netherlands) T Nijssen (Hungary) A Temesvári	3	7	27
(South Africa) S Kruger (Czechoslovakia) A Strnadová	6	1	2
4	(United States) R Leach (United States) Z Garrison	3	6	6

Second round
LL	(Australia) M Woodforde (United States) A Frazier	4	1
WC	(South Africa) C van Rensburg (South Africa) E Reinach	6	6
(Netherlands) J Siemerink (Netherlands) C Vis	7^{7}	3	10
16	(Australia) M Kratzmann (United States) P Shriver	6^{5}	6	8
11	(United States) K Flach (United States) K Jordan	4	3
(United States) S Salumaa (Luxembourg) K Kschwendt	6	6
(Netherlands) M Schapers (Netherlands) B Schultz	3	6	13
4	(United States) R Leach (United States) Z Garrison	6	3	11

Third round
WC	(South Africa) C van Rensburg (South Africa) E Reinach	6	6
(Netherlands) J Siemerink (Netherlands) C Vis	2	4
(United States) S Salumaa (Luxembourg) K Kschwendt	6	2	1
(Netherlands) M Schapers (Netherlands) B Schultz	3	6	6

Quarterfinals
WC	(South Africa) C van Rensburg (South Africa) E Reinach	7^{7}	7^{7}
(Netherlands) M Schapers (Netherlands) B Schultz	6^{5}	6^{5}

==== Section 4 ====
First round
LL	(South Africa) L Bale (Netherlands) A van Buuren	3	6^{3}
(United States) S DeVries (Japan) N Miyagi	6	7^{7}
(United States) J Rive (United States) S Collins	6^{3}	6	6
(Australia) L Warder (Australia) J-A Faull	7^{7}	4	2
(Australia) J Stoltenberg (Australia) R Stubbs	4	6	6
WC	(United States) T Mayotte (Puerto Rico) G Fernández	6	2	2
Q	(Australia) A Kratzmann (Australia) K-A Guse	4	2
10	(South Africa) D Visser (South Africa) R Fairbank-Nideffer	6	6
13	(Czechoslovakia) C Suk (Czechoslovakia) H Suková	7^{8}	6^{6}	6
(United States) B Shelton (United States) L McNeil	6^{6}	7^{8}	2
(United States) B Garnett (Netherlands) C Bakkum	6	6
(Sweden) T Svantesson (United States) T Whitlinger	4	2
(Belgium) L Pimek (Soviet Union) L Savchenko	4	6	6
(United States) G Van Emburgh (United States) P Mager	6	4	3
(United States) P Annacone (United States) S Rehe	4	3
2	(Australia) J Fitzgerald (Australia) E Smylie	6	6

Second round
(United States) S DeVries (Japan) N Miyagi	4	6	6
(United States) J Rive (United States) S Collins	6	3	4
(Australia) J Stoltenberg (Australia) R Stubbs	6	3	6
10	(South Africa) D Visser (South Africa) R Fairbank-Nideffer	3	6	3
13	(Czechoslovakia) C Suk (Czechoslovakia) H Suková	7^{7}	7^{7}
(United States) B Garnett (Netherlands) C Bakkum	6^{5}	6^{4}
(Belgium) L Pimek (Soviet Union) L Savchenko	3	2
2	(Australia) J Fitzgerald (Australia) E Smylie	6	6

Third round
(United States) S DeVries (Japan) N Miyagi	6^{5}	3
(Australia) J Stoltenberg (Australia) R Stubbs	7^{7}	6
13	(Czechoslovakia) C Suk (Czechoslovakia) H Suková	3	4
2	(Australia) J Fitzgerald (Australia) E Smylie	6	6

Quarterfinals
(Australia) J Stoltenberg (Australia) R Stubbs	4	2
2	(Australia) J Fitzgerald (Australia) E Smylie	6	6
