= 1991 Wimbledon Championships – Women's doubles =

Women's doubles
- 1991 Wimbledon Championships

Final
- Champions: (Soviet Union) Larisa Savchenko (Soviet Union) Natasha Zvereva
- Runners-up: (Puerto Rico) Gigi Fernández (Czechoslovakia) Jana Novotná
- Score: 6–4, 3–6, 8–6

Details
- Draw: 64 (4 Q / 4 WC )
- Seeds: 16

Events
Singles	men	women		boys	girls
Doubles	men	women	mixed	boys	girls
WC Singles	men	women	quad
WC Doubles	men	women	quad
Legends	men	women	seniors
← 1990 ·	Wimbledon Championships	· 1992 →

Larisa Savchenko and Natasha Zvereva defeated the defending champion Jana Novotná and her partner Gigi Fernández in the final, 6–4, 3–6, 8–6 to win the ladies' doubles tennis title at the 1991 Wimbledon Championships.

Novotná and Helena Suková were the defending champions, but did not play together. Suková partnered Arantxa Sánchez Vicario, but lost in the quarterfinals to Martina Navratilova and Pam Shriver.

== Seeds ==
1. (Puerto Rico) Gigi Fernández / (Czechoslovakia) Jana Novotná (final)
2. (Soviet Union) Larisa Savchenko / (Soviet Union) Natasha Zvereva (champions)
3. (Spain) Arantxa Sánchez Vicario / (Czechoslovakia) Helena Suková (quarterfinals)
4. (United States) Mary Joe Fernández / (United States) Zina Garrison (semifinals)
5. (United States) Kathy Jordan / (United States) Lori McNeil (quarterfinals)
6. (Australia) Nicole Provis / (Australia) Elizabeth Smylie (third round)
7. (United States) Gretchen Magers / (United States) Robin White (quarterfinals)
8. (United States) Martina Navratilova / (United States) Pam Shriver (semifinals)
9. (United States) Elise Burgin / (United States) Patty Fendick (first round)
10. (United States) Katrina Adams / (Netherlands) Manon Bollegraf (quarterfinals)
11. (United States) Jennifer Capriati / (Argentina) Mercedes Paz (third round)
12. (Canada) Jill Hetherington / (United States) Kathy Rinaldi (third round)
13. (Germany) Claudia Kohde-Kilsch / (South Africa) Elna Reinach (third round)
14. (France) Nathalie Tauziat / (Austria) Judith Wiesner (third round)
15. (South Africa) Rosalyn Fairbank-Nideffer / (Netherlands) Brenda Schultz (second round)
16. (South Africa) Lise Gregory / (United States) Alysia May (second round)

Click on the seed number of a player to go to their draw section.

== Draw ==
=== Key ===
- Q = Qualifier
- WC = Wild card
- LL = Lucky loser
- Alt = Alternate
- ITF = ITF entry
- PR = Protected ranking
- SR = Special ranking
- SE = Special exempt
- JE = Junior exempt
- JR = Junior Accelerator Programme entrant
- CO = College Accelerator Programme entrant
- NG = Next Gen Accelerator Program entrant
- w/o = Walkover
- r = Retired
- d = Defaulted

=== Finals ===
Quarterfinals
1	(Puerto Rico) Gigi Fernández (Czechoslovakia) Jana Novotná	6	6
7	(United States) Gretchen Magers (United States) Robin White	3	3
4	(United States) Mary Joe Fernández (United States) Zina Garrison	4	7^{7}	6
5	(United States) Kathy Jordan (United States) Lori McNeil	6	6^{3}	2
8	(United States) Martina Navratilova (United States) Pam Shriver	6	7^{7}
3	(Spain) Arantxa Sánchez Vicario (Czechoslovakia) Helena Suková	3	6^{3}
10	(United States) Katrina Adams (Netherlands) Manon Bollegraf	4	2
2	(Soviet Union) Larisa Savchenko (Soviet Union) Natasha Zvereva	6	6

Semifinals
1	(Puerto Rico) Gigi Fernández (Czechoslovakia) Jana Novotná	7	6
4	(United States) Mary Joe Fernández (United States) Zina Garrison-Jackson	5	2
8	(United States) Martina Navratilova (United States) Pam Shriver	6	2	4
2	(Soviet Union) Larisa Savchenko (Soviet Union) Natasha Zvereva	2	6	6

Final
1	(Puerto Rico) Gigi Fernández (Czechoslovakia) Jana Novotná	4	6	4
2	(Soviet Union) Larisa Savchenko (Soviet Union) Natasha Zvereva	6	3	6

=== Top half ===
==== Section 1 ====
First round
1	(Puerto Rico) G Fernández (Czechoslovakia) J Novotná	6	6
(Czechoslovakia) P Langrová (Czechoslovakia) R Zrubáková	1	1
(United States) S Rehe (Hungary) A Temesvári	7^{7}	7^{7}
(Bulgaria) K Maleeva (Bulgaria) M Maleeva	6^{1}	6^{3}
WC	(United Kingdom) A Grunfeld (United Kingdom) S Loosemore	4	4
Q	(United Kingdom) B Griffiths (United Kingdom) J Wood	6	6
(Czechoslovakia) I Jankovská (Czechoslovakia) E Melicharová	3	2
12	(Canada) J Hetherington (United States) K Rinaldi	6	6
9	(United States) E Burgin (United States) P Fendick	6	2	4
(United States) S Stafford (United States) T Whitlinger	2	6	6
(United Kingdom) B Borneo (United Kingdom) C Wood	6	7
(Netherlands) C Bakkum (Netherlands) N Jagerman	3	5
(Germany) E Pfaff (Australia) R Stubbs	6	4	6
(Indonesia) Y Basuki (Indonesia) S Wibowo	4	6	3
(France) I Demongeot (United Kingdom) J Durie	5	5
7	(United States) G Magers (United States) R White	7	7

Second round
1	(Puerto Rico) G Fernández (Czechoslovakia) J Novotná	6^{3}	6	6
(United States) S Rehe (Hungary) A Temesvári	7^{7}	4	2
Q	(United Kingdom) B Griffiths (United Kingdom) J Wood	2	4
12	(Canada) J Hetherington (United States) K Rinaldi	6	6
(United States) S Stafford (United States) T Whitlinger	6	6
(United Kingdom) B Borneo (United Kingdom) C Wood	2	2
(Germany) E Pfaff (Australia) R Stubbs	4	2
7	(United States) G Magers (United States) R White	6	6

Third round
1	(Puerto Rico) G Fernández (Czechoslovakia) J Novotná	6	7^{7}
12	(Canada) J Hetherington (United States) K Rinaldi	2	6^{4}
(United States) S Stafford (United States) T Whitlinger	2	2
7	(United States) G Magers (United States) R White	6	6

Quarterfinals
1	(Puerto Rico) G Fernández (Czechoslovakia) J Novotná	6	6
7	(United States) G Magers (United States) R White	3	3

==== Section 2 ====
First round
4	(United States) MJ Fernández (United States) Z Garrison	6	6
(Czechoslovakia) L Lásková (Soviet Union) E Maniokova	2	3
LL	(Mexico) L Novelo (United States) E Somerville	4	4
(Netherlands) G Coorengel (Netherlands) A van Buuren	6	6
Q	(Japan) R Hiraki (Japan) A Nishiya	6^{0}	1
(Australia) M Jaggard (France) C Suire	7^{7}	6
(Canada) H Kelesi (United States) J Smoller	3	3
13	(Germany) C Kohde-Kilsch (South Africa) E Reinach	6	6
16	(South Africa) L Gregory (United States) A May	6	4	6
(Japan) A Kijimuta (Japan) N Miyagi	2	6	1
Q	(United States) C Benjamin (United States) T Whittington	7^{10}	3	5
(Czechoslovakia) R Rajchrtová (Czechoslovakia) A Strnadová	6^{8}	6	7
(France) P Paradis-Mangon (Australia) A Scott	7	6
(Italy) L Ferrando (Italy) L Golarsa	5	2
(France) A Dechaume (Germany) W Probst	2	3
5	(United States) K Jordan (United States) L McNeil	6	6

Second round
4	(United States) MJ Fernández (United States) Z Garrison	6	6
(Netherlands) G Coorengel (Netherlands) A van Buuren	1	3
(Australia) M Jaggard (France) C Suire	4	4
13	(Germany) C Kohde-Kilsch (South Africa) E Reinach	6	6
16	(South Africa) L Gregory (United States) A May	0	5
(Czechoslovakia) R Rajchrtová (Czechoslovakia) A Strnadová	6	7
(France) P Paradis-Mangon (Australia) A Scott	1	1
5	(United States) K Jordan (United States) L McNeil	6	6

Third round
4	(United States) MJ Fernández (United States) Z Garrison	6	6
13	(Germany) C Kohde-Kilsch (South Africa) E Reinach	3	1
(Czechoslovakia) R Rajchrtová (Czechoslovakia) A Strnadová	2	6^{3}
5	(United States) K Jordan (United States) L McNeil	6	7^{7}

Quarterfinals
4	(United States) MJ Fernández (United States) Z Garrison	4	7^{7}	6
5	(United States) K Jordan (United States) L McNeil	6	6^{3}	2

=== Bottom half ===
==== Section 3 ====
First round
8	(United States) M Navratilova (United States) P Shriver	6	6
WC	(United Kingdom) K Hand (United Kingdom) J Salmon	1	0
WC	(United Kingdom) S Gomer (United Kingdom) V Lake	6	6^{5}	4
(United States) M Louie Harper (Japan) M Kidowaki	4	7^{7}	6
(Australia) J-A Faull (Australia) R McQuillan	7	4	6
(Italy) L Garrone (Luxembourg) K Kschwendt	5	6	1
(United States) S Collins (Australia) K Radford	2	6	4
15	(South Africa) R Fairbank-Nideffer (Netherlands) B Schultz	6	1	6
11	(United States) J Capriati (Argentina) M Paz	6	6
(Czechoslovakia) J Pospíšilová (Czechoslovakia) E Švíglerová	1	4
(South Africa) L Barnard (United States) A Henricksson	4	6^{4}
(Belgium) S Appelmans (Netherlands) C Vis	6	7^{7}
(Germany) S Graf (Germany) C Porwik	6^{7}	6	4
(United States) H Cioffi (United States) A Frazier	7^{9}	1	6
Q	(France) J Halard (Germany) A Huber	6^{4}	4
3	(Spain) A Sánchez Vicario (Czechoslovakia) H Suková	7^{7}	6

Second round
8	(United States) M Navratilova (United States) P Shriver	6	6
(United States) M Louie Harper (Japan) M Kidowaki	4	0
(Australia) J-A Faull (Australia) R McQuillan	6	1	6
15	(South Africa) R Fairbank-Nideffer (Netherlands) B Schultz	2	6	4
11	(United States) J Capriati (Argentina) M Paz	6	6
(Belgium) S Appelmans (Netherlands) C Vis	2	3
(United States) H Cioffi (United States) A Frazier	6	1	1
3	(Spain) A Sánchez Vicario (Czechoslovakia) H Suková	4	6	6

Third round
8	(United States) M Navratilova (United States) P Shriver	6^{5}	6	6
(Australia) J-A Faull (Australia) R McQuillan	7^{7}	2	2
11	(United States) J Capriati (Argentina) M Paz	2	7^{9}	1
3	(Spain) A Sánchez Vicario (Czechoslovakia) H Suková	6	6^{7}	6

Quarterfinals
8	(United States) M Navratilova (United States) P Shriver	6	7^{7}
3	(Spain) A Sánchez Vicario (Czechoslovakia) H Suková	3	6^{3}

==== Section 4 ====
First round
6	(Australia) N Provis (Australia) E Smylie	6	6
(United States) R Baranski (United States) T Morton	3	1
(New Zealand) B Cordwell (Sweden) C Lindqvist	6^{3}	5
(Czechoslovakia) I Budařová (Czechoslovakia) A Noháčová	7^{7}	7
(United States) C MacGregor (United States) P Mager	4	2
LL	(Japan) K Date (Japan) E Iida	6	6
(Australia) L Field (Sweden) M Strandlund	2	6^{4}
10	(United States) K Adams (Netherlands) M Bollegraf	6	7^{7}
14	(France) N Tauziat (Austria) J Wiesner	6	7
(Australia) K Godridge (United States) G Helgeson	3	5
(Peru) L Gildemeister (Denmark) T Scheuer-Larsen	6	6
(United States) L Spadea (Netherlands) H ter Riet	4	2
LL	(Australia) J Limmer (Australia) A Woolcock	6^{4}	3
WC	(United Kingdom) M Javer (United Kingdom) S Smith	7^{7}	6
(Switzerland) C Caverzasio (France) N Herreman	2	2
2	(Soviet Union) L Savchenko (Soviet Union) N Zvereva	6	6

Second round
6	(Australia) N Provis (Australia) E Smylie	6	6
(Czechoslovakia) I Budařová (Czechoslovakia) A Noháčová	4	2
LL	(Japan) K Date (Japan) E Iida	6^{5}	3
10	(United States) K Adams (Netherlands) M Bollegraf	7^{7}	6
14	(France) N Tauziat (Austria) J Wiesner	7^{10}	6
(Peru) L Gildemeister (Denmark) T Scheuer-Larsen	6^{8}	3
WC	(United Kingdom) M Javer (United Kingdom) S Smith	3	3
2	(Soviet Union) L Savchenko (Soviet Union) N Zvereva	6	6

Third round
6	(Australia) N Provis (Australia) E Smylie	2	6^{5}
10	(United States) K Adams (Netherlands) M Bollegraf	6	7^{7}
14	(France) N Tauziat (Austria) J Wiesner	1	0
2	(Soviet Union) L Savchenko (Soviet Union) N Zvereva	6	6

Quarterfinals
10	(United States) K Adams (Netherlands) M Bollegraf	4	2
2	(Soviet Union) L Savchenko (Soviet Union) N Zvereva	6	6
