= Magnus Martinelle =

Swedish tennis player

- Country (sports): Sweden
- Born: 8 February 1973 (age 52)
- Plays: Right-handed

Singles

Grand Slam singles results
- French Open Junior: 1R (1991)
- Wimbledon Junior: 1R (1991)
- US Open Junior: 2R (1991)

Doubles

Grand Slam doubles results
- French Open Junior: W (1991)
- Wimbledon Junior: 2R (1991)

Magnus Martinelle (born 8 February 1973) is a former tennis player from Sweden.

== Tennis career ==
=== Juniors ===
Martinelle was once Sweden's No. 1 junior player, and he was the runner-up at the 1991 Salk Open after losing the final to Alex Rădulescu in two sets.

Partnering with countryman Thomas Enqvist, Martinelle won the boys' doubles event at the 1991 French Open.

=== Pro tour ===
In the ATP Tour, Martinelle did not enter any main draw. He lost in the singles qualifying rounds at the 1991 Stockholm Open.
