= 1991 Wimbledon Championships – Women's singles =

Women's singles
- 1991 Wimbledon Championships

Final
- Champion: (Germany) Steffi Graf
- Runner-up: (Argentina) Gabriela Sabatini
- Score: 6–4, 3–6, 8–6

Details
- Draw: 128 (8 Q / 8 WC )
- Seeds: 16

Events
Singles	men	women		boys	girls
Doubles	men	women	mixed	boys	girls
WC Singles	men	women	quad
WC Doubles	men	women	quad
Legends	men	women	seniors
← 1990 ·	Wimbledon Championships	· 1992 →

Steffi Graf defeated Gabriela Sabatini in the final, 6–4, 3–6, 8–6 to win the ladies' singles tennis title at the 1991 Wimbledon Championships. It was her third Wimbledon singles title and tenth major singles title overall. It was Sabatini's third and last appearance in a major final.

Martina Navratilova was the defending champion, but lost in the quarterfinals to Jennifer Capriati.

== Seeds ==
1. (Germany) Steffi Graf (champion)
2. (Argentina) Gabriela Sabatini (final)
3. (United States) Martina Navratilova (quarterfinals)
4. (Spain) Arantxa Sánchez Vicario (quarterfinals)
5. (United States) Mary Joe Fernández (semifinals)
6. (Czechoslovakia) Jana Novotná (second round)
7. (United States) Zina Garrison (quarterfinals)
8. (Bulgaria) Katerina Maleeva (fourth round)
9. (United States) Jennifer Capriati (semifinals)
10. (Czechoslovakia) Helena Suková (first round)
11. (France) Nathalie Tauziat (fourth round)
12. (Soviet Union) Natasha Zvereva (second round)
13. (Germany) Anke Huber (fourth round)
14. (United States) Amy Frazier (fourth round)
15. (Italy) Sandra Cecchini (first round)
16. (Austria) Judith Wiesner (fourth round)

Click on the seed number of a player to go to their draw section.

The original #1 seed Monica Seles withdrew due to injury before the tournament draw was made. All original seeds from 2-15 moved up one place, and a new #16 seed was added.

== Draw ==
=== Key ===
- Q = Qualifier
- WC = Wild card
- LL = Lucky loser
- Alt = Alternate
- ITF = ITF entry
- PR = Protected ranking
- SR = Special ranking
- SE = Special exempt
- JE = Junior exempt
- JR = Junior Accelerator Programme entrant
- CO = College Accelerator Programme entrant
- NG = Next Gen Accelerator Program entrant
- w/o = Walkover
- r = Retired
- d = Defaulted

=== Finals ===
Quarterfinals
1	(Germany) Steffi Graf	6	6
7	(United States) Zina Garrison	1	3
4	(Spain) Arantxa Sánchez Vicario	2	5
5	(United States) Mary Joe Fernández	6	7
9	(United States) Jennifer Capriati	6	7
3	(United States) Martina Navratilova	4	5
(Peru) Laura Gildemeister	2	1
2	(Argentina) Gabriela Sabatini	6	6

Semifinals
1	(Germany) Steffi Graf	6	6
5	(United States) Mary Joe Fernández	2	4
9	(United States) Jennifer Capriati	4	4
2	(Argentina) Gabriela Sabatini	6	6

Final
1	(Germany) Steffi Graf	6	3	8
2	(Argentina) Gabriela Sabatini	4	6	6

=== Top half ===
==== Section 1 ====
First round
1	(Germany) S Graf	6	6
(Belgium) S Appelmans	2	2
(Germany) C Porwik	4	1
(United States) M Louie Harper	6	6
(United States) K Rinaldi	5	2
(France) N Herreman	7	6
(United States) A Henricksson	4	6^{4}
(Indonesia) Y Basuki	6	7^{7}
(France) J Halard	6	2	6
LL	(New Zealand) C Toleafoa	1	6	3
(United States) D Graham	3	2
(United States) M Werdel	6	6
(Italy) F Bonsignori	1	1
(United States) R White	6	6
(Luxembourg) K Kschwendt	6^{3}	4
14	(United States) A Frazier	7^{7}	6

Second round
1	(Germany) S Graf	6	6
(United States) M Louie Harper	0	1
(France) N Herreman	4	4
(Indonesia) Y Basuki	6	6
(France) J Halard	2	4
(United States) M Werdel	6	6
(United States) R White	5	4
14	(United States) A Frazier	7	6

Third round
1	(Germany) S Graf	6	6
(Indonesia) Y Basuki	2	3
(United States) M Werdel	2	1
14	(United States) A Frazier	6	6

Fourth round
1	(Germany) S Graf	6	6
14	(United States) A Frazier	2	1

==== Section 2 ====
First round
13	(Germany) A Huber	6	6
(Germany) V Martinek	1	2
(United States) T Whitlinger	6	6
(Bulgaria) M Maleeva	1	3
(Netherlands) M Bollegraf	6	6
WC	(United Kingdom) V Humphreys-Davies	4	4
(United Kingdom) J Durie	6	6
(Canada) H Kelesi	3	2
(Japan) N Miyagi	0	3
(Switzerland) E Zardo	6	6
(Sweden) M Strandlund	6	7^{7}
(Japan) R Hiraki	2	6^{5}
(Bulgaria) E Pampoulova	2	6	6
WC	(United Kingdom) B Borneo	6	3	4
(United Kingdom) S Gomer	3	3
7	(United States) Z Garrison	6	6

Second round
13	(Germany) A Huber	6	6
(United States) T Whitlinger	2	1
(Netherlands) M Bollegraf	6	5	6
(United Kingdom) J Durie	3	7	3
(Switzerland) E Zardo	4	4
(Sweden) M Strandlund	6	6
(Bulgaria) E Pampoulova	3	1
7	(United States) Z Garrison	6	6

Third round
13	(Germany) A Huber	6	6^{5}	6
(Netherlands) M Bollegraf	3	7^{7}	0
(Sweden) M Strandlund	3	3
7	(United States) Z Garrison	6	6

Fourth round
13	(Germany) A Huber	6	3	0
7	(United States) Z Garrison	4	6	6

==== Section 3 ====
First round
4	(Spain) A Sánchez Vicario	6	6
(Germany) B Rittner	1	2
(Italy) F Romano	6^{5}	2
(South Africa) A Coetzer	7^{7}	6
(Czechoslovakia) P Langrová	4	5
(United States) L McNeil	6	7
(Switzerland) C Bartos-Cserepy	2	2
(Japan) N Sawamatsu	6	6
LL	(Australia) J-A Faull	6	6
(Australia) K Godridge	0	2
(Australia) A Minter	6	6
(United States) S Martin	4	0
(United States) D Faber	6	6^{4}	6
(Switzerland) C Caverzasio	3	7^{7}	2
(Puerto Rico) G Fernández	4	6	6
10	(Czechoslovakia) H Suková	6	1	4

Second round
4	(Spain) A Sánchez Vicario	6	6
(South Africa) A Coetzer	4	1
(United States) L McNeil	3	6	6
(Japan) N Sawamatsu	6	2	2
LL	(Australia) J-A Faull	3	2
(Australia) A Minter	6	6
(United States) D Faber	5	5
(Puerto Rico) G Fernández	7	7

Third round
4	(Spain) A Sánchez Vicario	6	6
(United States) L McNeil	2	4
(Australia) A Minter	6	6
(Puerto Rico) G Fernández	3	3

Fourth round
4	(Spain) A Sánchez Vicario	7	3	6
(Australia) A Minter	5	6	1

==== Section 4 ====
First round
16	(Austria) J Wiesner	6	6
(United States) N Cioffi	1	2
(Soviet Union) L Savchenko	6	6^{5}	8
(Hungary) A Temesvári	2	7^{7}	6
WC	(United Kingdom) B Griffiths	1	3
(Germany) C Kohde-Kilsch	6	6
Q	(Netherlands) N Jagerman	7	6
Q	(Netherlands) M Oremans	5	4
(United States) P Shriver	6	7
(United States) A Leand	0	5
(United States) E deLone	6	2	4
(Argentina) B Fulco	3	6	6
(United States) A Keller	7	6
(Italy) L Golarsa	5	3
Q	(Netherlands) P Kamstra	2	4
5	(United States) MJ Fernández	6	6

Second round
16	(Austria) J Wiesner	6	6
(Soviet Union) L Savchenko	3	0
(Germany) C Kohde-Kilsch	7^{7}	6
Q	(Netherlands) N Jagerman	6^{2}	2
(United States) P Shriver	6	6
(Argentina) B Fulco	0	3
(United States) A Keller	6^{5}	1
5	(United States) MJ Fernández	7^{7}	6

Third round
16	(Austria) J Wiesner	3	7	6
(Germany) C Kohde-Kilsch	6	5	1
(United States) P Shriver	3	5
5	(United States) MJ Fernández	6	7

Fourth round
16	(Austria) J Wiesner	0	5
5	(United States) MJ Fernández	6	7

=== Bottom half ===
==== Section 5 ====
First round
6	(Czechoslovakia) J Novotná	6	6
LL	(Australia) N Pratt	3	0
(Netherlands) B Schultz	6	6
(Austria) B Reinstadler	3	0
(United States) E Nagelsen	2	1
(Soviet Union) E Brioukhovets	6	6
(United Kingdom) S Smith	6	4	2
(Australia) N Provis	3	6	6
(Germany) W Probst	7^{8}	7
(Czechoslovakia) E Švíglerová	6^{6}	5
Q	(Belgium) E Callens	7^{7}	2	7
(France) N van Lottum	6^{1}	6	5
(Czechoslovakia) R Zrubáková	7^{7}	6
(Australia) R McQuillan	6^{4}	2
(United States) S Stafford	0	5
9	(United States) J Capriati	6	7

Second round
6	(Czechoslovakia) J Novotná	6	6^{5}	4
(Netherlands) B Schultz	4	7^{7}	6
(Soviet Union) E Brioukhovets	7^{7}	6
(Australia) N Provis	6^{3}	4
(Germany) W Probst	7^{7}	6
Q	(Belgium) E Callens	6^{5}	3
(Czechoslovakia) R Zrubáková	2	3
9	(United States) J Capriati	6	6

Third round
(Netherlands) B Schultz	5	6	7
(Soviet Union) E Brioukhovets	7	4	5
(Germany) W Probst	3	6	3
9	(United States) J Capriati	6	1	6

Fourth round
(Netherlands) B Schultz	6	1	1
9	(United States) J Capriati	3	6	6

==== Section 6 ====
First round
15	(Italy) A-M Cecchini	3	6	1
(Australia) E Smylie	6	3	6
(United States) S Sloane	2	2
Q	(France) C Suire	6	6
Q	(France) I Demongeot	1	0
(Sweden) C Lindqvist	6	6
(Czechoslovakia) K Habšudová	6	6
(Sweden) C Dahlman	3	2
WC	(United Kingdom) S Bentley	6	5	1
(Japan) M Kidowaki	1	7	6
(Italy) L Garrone	6	7^{7}
(United States) G Magers	4	6^{5}
(France) A Dechaume	4	4
WC	(United Kingdom) A Grunfeld	6	6
(South Africa) E Reinach	6	2	4
3	(United States) M Navratilova	4	6	6

Second round
(Australia) E Smylie	6	6
Q	(France) C Suire	3	4
(Sweden) C Lindqvist	6	6
(Czechoslovakia) K Habšudová	3	2
(Japan) M Kidowaki	4	3
(Italy) L Garrone	6	6
WC	(United Kingdom) A Grunfeld	3	1
3	(United States) M Navratilova	6	6

Third round
(Australia) E Smylie	1	6^{5}
(Sweden) C Lindqvist	6	7^{7}
(Italy) L Garrone	2	2
3	(United States) Navratilova	6	6

Fourth round
(Sweden) C Lindqvist	1	3
3	(United States) M Navratilova	6	6

==== Section 7 ====
First round
8	(Bulgaria) K Maleeva	7	6
WC	(United Kingdom) J Salmon	5	3
WC	(United Kingdom) K Hand	0	4
(United States) A Grossman	6	6
(South Africa) R Fairbank-Nideffer	2	6	0
(Canada) P Hy	6	3	6
(France) P Paradis-Mangon	6	6
Q	(Australia) K Radford	3	2
(United States) S Rehe	3	6	4
(South Africa) M de Swardt	6	3	6
(United Kingdom) C Wood	4	4
(Peru) L Gildemeister	6	6
(United States) L Harvey-Wild	6	6
(United States) L Bonder-Kreiss	4	2
(Argentina) C Tessi	6^{3}	4
12	(Soviet Union) N Zvereva	7^{7}	6

Second round
8	(Bulgaria) K Maleeva	6	6
(United States) A Grossman	4	4
(Canada) P Hy	4	6	6
(France) P Paradis-Mangon	6	4	2
(South Africa) M de Swardt	4	1
(Peru) L Gildemeister	6	6
(United States) L Harvey-Wild	6	6
12	(Soviet Union) N Zvereva	4	1

Third round
8	(Bulgaria) K Maleeva	6	6
(Canada) P Hy	3	4
(Peru) L Gildemeister	2
(United States) L Harvey-Wild	2^{r}

Fourth round
8	(Bulgaria) K Maleeva	6	2	3
(Peru) L Gildemeister	3	6	6

==== Section 8 ====
First round
11	(France) N Tauziat	6	7
(Czechoslovakia) R Rajchrtová	4	5
(Japan) A Kijimuta	6	6
(Argentina) M Paz	1	3
LL	(Canada) J Hetherington	6^{5}	6	1
(United States) P Fendick	7^{7}	4	6
(Italy) L Ferrando	6	3	6
LL	(Japan) K Date	4	6	2
(United States) G Helgeson	6^{12}	4
(United States) C Cunningham	7^{14}	6
(Czechoslovakia) A Strnadová	6	7
WC	(United Kingdom) S Loosemore	4	5
Q	(Australia) R Stubbs	2	2
(France) K Quentrec	6	6
(United Kingdom) M Javer	4	0
2	(Argentina) G Sabatini	6	6

Second round
11	(France) N Tauziat	3	6	6
(Japan) A Kijimuta	6	2	2
(United States) P Fendick	6	1	5
(Italy) L Ferrando	4	6	7
(United States) C Cunningham	1	3
(Czechoslovakia) A Strnadová	6	6
(France) K Quentrec	4	2
2	(Argentina) G Sabatini	6	6

Third round
11	(France) N Tauziat	6	6
(Italy) L Ferrando	1	1
(Czechoslovakia) A Strnadová	1	3
2	(Argentina) G Sabatini	6	6

Fourth round
11	(France) N Tauziat	6^{3}	3
2	(Argentina) G Sabatini	7^{7}	6

Preceded by 1991 French Open – Women's singles	Grand Slam women's singles	Succeeded by 1991 US Open – Women's singles
