= Jamie Holmes (tennis) =

Australian tennis player

- Full name: Jamie Holmes
- Country (sports): Australia
- Born: 4 May 1973 (age 52) Sydney, New South Wales, Australia
- Plays: Right-handed
- Prize money: $800,021

Singles
- Career record: 0–0
- Career titles: 0; 0 Challenger, 0 Futures
- Highest ranking: No. 289 (28 August 1995)

Grand Slam singles results
- Australian Open: Q3 (1998)
- Wimbledon: Q2 (1996)
- US Open: Q2 (1995)

Doubles
- Career record: 6–17
- Career titles: 0; 0 Challenger, 0 Futures
- Highest ranking: No. 116 (10 August 1998)

Grand Slam doubles results
- Australian Open: 2R (1996)
- Wimbledon: 2R (1998)
- US Open: Q2 (1997, 1998)
- Last updated on: 31 May 2022.

Jamie Holmes (born 4 May 1973) is a former professional tennis player from Australia.

== Biography ==
Holmes, who is originally from Sydney, attended the Australian Institute of Sport in Canberra. During his junior career, Holmes formed a doubles partnership with Paul Kilderry which took them to the boys' doubles semi-finals at the 1990 Wimbledon Championships, the final of the 1991 Australian Open, followed by quarter-finals at the 1991 French Open and 1991 Wimbledon Championships.

On the professional circuit, Holmes competed in the men's doubles main draw of every Australian Open from 1995 to 1998. He also played doubles at the 1998 Wimbledon Championships with Andrew Painter and made the second round.

At ATP Tour level he featured in the doubles events of 11 tournaments, all across 1997 and 1998. He also won a total of three Challenger titles, one in Bronx, New York and the others in Perth.

Presently, Holmes is a real estate agent in Palm Beach, Queensland.

== Junior Grand Slam finals ==
=== Doubles: 1 (1 runner-up) ===
Result	Year	Tournament	Surface	Partner	Opponents	Score
Loss	1991	Australian Open	Hard	(Australia) Paul Kilderry	(Australia) Grant Doyle (Australia) Joshua Eagle	6–7, 4–6

== ATP Challenger and ITF Futures finals ==
=== Doubles: 6 (3–3) ===
Legend ATP Challenger (3–3) ITF Futures (0–0)	Finals by surface Hard (3–1) Clay (0–2) Grass (0–0) Carpet (0–0)

Result	W–L	Date	Tournament	Tier	Surface	Partner	Opponents	Score
Win	1–0	Aug 1995	Bronx, United States	Challenger	Hard	(United Kingdom) Ross Matheson	(New Zealand) Steven Downs (New Zealand) James Greenhalgh	6–3, 5–7, 6–3
Win	2–0	Dec 1996	Perth, Australia	Challenger	Hard	(Australia) Andrew Painter	(Australia) Grant Doyle (Australia) Andrew Kratzmann	7–5, 6–4
Loss	2–1	Sep 1997	Edinburgh, United Kingdom	Challenger	Clay	(South Africa) Chris Haggard	(Australia) Wayne Arthurs (Australia) Grant Doyle	6–4, 2–6, 2–6
Win	3–1	Dec 1997	Perth, Australia	Challenger	Hard	(Australia) Paul Kilderry	(Australia) Lleyton Hewitt (Australia) Luke Smith	6–1, 3–6, 7–6
Loss	3–2	Feb 1998	Singapore, Singapore	Challenger	Hard	(Australia) Andrew Painter	(United States) Jim Thomas (Italy) Laurence Tieleman	3–6, 6–3, 6–7
Loss	3–3	May 1998	Dresden, Germany	Challenger	Clay	(Australia) Andrew Painter	(Argentina) Pablo Albano (Netherlands) Sander Groen	3–6, 4–6
