= Scott Gessner =

German tennis player

- Country (sports): West Germany; Germany
- Born: 23 February 1973 (age 52); Bensberg, West Germany
- Height: 6 ft 0 in (183 cm)
- Plays: Right-handed
- Prize money: $13,366

Singles
- Career record: 0–2
- Highest ranking: No. 293 (2 May 1994)

Doubles
- Highest ranking: No. 607 (29 July 1996)

Scott Gessner (born 23 February 1973) is a German former professional tennis player.

Gessner, who won the 1989 World Youth Cup (Junior Davis Cup) with West Germany, competed on the professional tour in the 1990s and had a career best singles ranking of 293 in the world.

On the ATP Tour, Gessner qualified for the main draw of two tournaments, the Singapore Open in 1992 and Austrian Open in 1993. He lost his first round matches to Alexander Mronz and Thierry Champion respectively.
