= 1991 French Open =

- Date: 27 May – 9 June 1991
- Edition: 90
- Category: 61st Grand Slam (ITF)
- Surface: Clay
- Location: Paris (XVI^{e}), France
- Venue: Stade Roland Garros

Champions

Men's singles
- (United States) Jim Courier

Women's singles
- (Socialist Federal Republic of Yugoslavia) Monica Seles

Men's doubles
- (Australia) John Fitzgerald / (Sweden) Anders Järryd

Women's doubles
- (United States) Gigi Fernández / (Czechoslovakia) Jana Novotná

Mixed doubles
- (Czechoslovakia) Helena Suková / (Czechoslovakia) Cyril Suk
← 1990 ·	French Open	· 1992 →

The 1991 French Open was a tennis tournament that took place on the outdoor clay courts at the Stade Roland Garros in Paris, France. The tournament was held from 27 May until 9 June. It was the 90th staging of the French Open, and the second Grand Slam tennis event of 1991. It marked the centenary of the inaugural tournament.

== Seniors ==
=== Men's singles ===
(United States) Jim Courier defeated (United States) Andre Agassi (Note: It was the first all-American men's singles final since 1954, when Tony Trabert beat Art Larsen.), 3–6, 6–4, 2–6, 6–1, 6–4

- It was Courier's third title of the year, and his fourth overall. It was his first career Grand Slam title.

=== Women's singles ===
(Socialist Federal Republic of Yugoslavia) Monica Seles defeated (Spain) Arantxa Sánchez Vicario, 6–3, 6–4

- It was Seles's 4th title of the year, and her 14th overall. It was her 3rd career Grand Slam title, and her 2nd French Open title.

=== Men's doubles ===
(Australia) John Fitzgerald / (Sweden) Anders Järryd defeated (United States) Rick Leach / (United States) Jim Pugh, 6–0, 7–6

=== Women's doubles ===
(United States) Gigi Fernández / (Czechoslovakia) Jana Novotná defeated (Soviet Union) Larisa Savchenko Neiland / (Soviet Union) Natalia Zvereva, 6–4, 6–0

=== Mixed doubles ===
(Czechoslovakia) Helena Suková / (Czechoslovakia) Cyril Suk defeated (Netherlands) Caroline Vis / (Netherlands) Paul Haarhuis, 3–6, 6–4, 6–1

== Juniors ==
=== Boys' singles ===
(Ukraine) Andrei Medvedev defeated (Sweden) Thomas Enqvist, 6–4, 7–6

=== Girls' singles ===
(Israel) Anna Smashnova defeated (Argentina) Inés Gorrochategui, 2–6, 7–5, 6–1

=== Boys' doubles ===
(Sweden) Thomas Enqvist / (Sweden) Magnus Martinelle defeated (Austria) Julian Knowle / (Austria) Johannes Unterberger, 6–1, 6–3

=== Girls' doubles ===
(Spain) Eva Bes / (Argentina) Inés Gorrochategui defeated (Czechoslovakia) Zdeňka Málková / (Czechoslovakia) Eva Martincová, 6–1, 6–3

== Notes ==
Preceded by 1991 Australian Open	Grand Slams	Succeeded by 1991 Wimbledon Championships
