= 1991 Wimbledon Championships =

- Date: 24 June – 7 July
- Edition: 105th
- Category: Grand Slam
- Draw: 128S/64D/64XD
- Prize money: £4,010,970
- Surface: Grass
- Location: Church Road; SW19, Wimbledon, London, United Kingdom
- Venue: All England Lawn Tennis and Croquet Club

Champions

Men's singles
- (Germany) Michael Stich

Women's singles
- (Germany) Steffi Graf

Men's doubles
- (Australia) John Fitzgerald / (Sweden) Anders Järryd

Women's doubles
- (Soviet Union) Larisa Savchenko / (Soviet Union) Natasha Zvereva

Mixed doubles
- (Australia) John Fitzgerald / (Australia) Elizabeth Smylie

Boys' singles
- (Sweden) Thomas Enqvist

Girls' singles
- (Germany) Barbara Rittner

Boys' doubles
- (Morocco) Karim Alami / (Canada) Greg Rusedski

Girls' doubles
- (Australia) Catherine Barclay / (Israel) Limor Zaltz
← 1990 ·	Wimbledon Championships	· 1992 →

The 1991 Wimbledon Championships was a tennis tournament played on grass courts at the All England Lawn Tennis and Croquet Club in Wimbledon, London in the United Kingdom. It was the 105th edition of the Wimbledon Championships and were held from 24 June to 7 July 1991.

Due to heavy rain during the first week of the Championships, play was held on the "Middle Sunday", in this case 30 June, for the first time in the tournament's history.

== Prize money ==
The total prize money for 1991 championships was £4,010,970. The winner of the men's title earned £240,000 while the women's singles champion earned £216,000.

Event	W	F	SF	QF	Round of 16	Round of 32	Round of 64	Round of 128
Men's singles	£240,000	£120,000	£60,000	£31,200	£16,800	£9,715	£5,880	£3,600
Women's singles	£216,000	£108,000	£52,500	£26,520	£13,440	£7,530	£4,560	£2,790
Men's doubles *	£98,330	£49,160	£25,230	£13,100	£6,980	£3,790	£2,220	—
Women's doubles *	£85,060	£45,520	£20,190	£10,480	£5,230	£2,840	£1,610	—
Mixed doubles *	£41,720	£20,860	£10,430	£4,800	£2,400	£1,200	£540	—

_{* per team}

== Champions ==
=== Seniors ===
==== Men's singles ====
(Germany) Michael Stich defeated (Germany) Boris Becker, 6–4, 7–6^{(7–4)}, 6–4

- It was Stich's 1st career Grand Slam title and his 1st Wimbledon title.

==== Women's singles ====
(Germany) Steffi Graf defeated (Argentina) Gabriela Sabatini, 6–4, 3–6, 8–6

- It was Graf's 11th career Grand Slam title and her 3rd Wimbledon title.

==== Men's doubles ====
(Australia) John Fitzgerald / (Sweden) Anders Järryd defeated (Argentina) Javier Frana / (Mexico) Leonardo Lavalle, 6–3, 6–4, 6–7^{(7–9)}, 6–1

- It was Fitzgerald's 7th career Grand Slam title and his 2nd Wimbledon title. It was Järryd's 7th career Grand Slam title and his 2nd and last Wimbledon title.

==== Women's doubles ====
(Soviet Union) Larisa Savchenko / (Soviet Union) Natasha Zvereva defeated (Puerto Rico) Gigi Fernández / (Czechoslovakia) Jana Novotná 6–4, 3–6, 8–6

- It was Savchenko's 2nd career Grand Slam title and her 1st Wimbledon title. It was Zvereva's 3rd career Grand Slam title and her 1st Wimbledon title.

==== Mixed doubles ====
(Australia) John Fitzgerald / (Australia) Elizabeth Smylie defeated (United States) Jim Pugh / (Soviet Union) Natasha Zvereva, 7–6^{(7–4)}, 6–2

- It was Smylie's 4th and last career Grand Slam title and her 2nd Wimbledon title. It was Fitzgerald's 8th career Grand Slam title and his 3rd and last Wimbledon title.

=== Juniors ===
==== Boys' singles ====
(Sweden) Thomas Enqvist defeated (United States) Michael Joyce, 6–4, 6–3

==== Girls' singles ====
(Germany) Barbara Rittner defeated (Soviet Union) Elena Makarova, 6–7^{(6–8)}, 6–2, 6–3

==== Boys' doubles ====
(Morocco) Karim Alami / (Canada) Greg Rusedski defeated (South Africa) John-Laffnie de Jager / (Soviet Union) Andriy Medvedev, 1–6, 7–6^{(7–4)}, 6–4

==== Girls' doubles ====
(Australia) Catherine Barclay / (Israel) Limor Zaltz defeated (Australia) Joanne Limmer / (Australia) Angie Woolcock, 6–4, 6–4

== Singles seeds ==
=== Men's singles ===
1. (Sweden) Stefan Edberg (semifinals, lost to Michael Stich)
2. (Germany) Boris Becker (final, lost to Michael Stich)
3. (Czechoslovakia) Ivan Lendl (third round, lost to David Wheaton)
4. (United States) Jim Courier (quarterfinals, lost to Michael Stich)
5. (United States) Andre Agassi (quarterfinals, lost to David Wheaton)
6. (Germany) Michael Stich (champion)
7. (France) Guy Forget (quarterfinals, lost to Boris Becker)
8. (United States) Pete Sampras (second round, lost to Derrick Rostagno)
9. (United States) Michael Chang (first round, lost to Tim Mayotte)
10. (Socialist Federal Republic of Yugoslavia) Goran Ivanišević (second round, lost to Nick Brown)
11. (Spain) Emilio Sánchez (first round, lost to Patrick McEnroe)
12. (Soviet Union) Andrei Cherkasov (first round, lost to Richey Reneberg)
13. (Switzerland) Jakob Hlasek (second round, lost to Todd Woodbridge)
14. (Czechoslovakia) Karel Nováček (fourth round, lost to Jim Courier)
15. (United States) Brad Gilbert (third round, lost to Christian Bergström)
16. (United States) John McEnroe (fourth round, lost to Stefan Edberg)

=== Women's singles ===
1. (Germany) Steffi Graf (champion)
2. (Argentina) Gabriela Sabatini (final, lost to Steffi Graf)
3. (United States) Martina Navratilova (quarterfinals, lost to Jennifer Capriati)
4. (Spain) Arantxa Sánchez Vicario (quarterfinals, lost to Mary Joe Fernández)
5. (United States) Mary Joe Fernández (semifinals, lost to Steffi Graf)
6. (Czechoslovakia) Jana Novotná (second round, lost to Brenda Schultz)
7. (United States) Zina Garrison (quarterfinals, lost to Steffi Graf)
8. (Bulgaria) Katerina Maleeva (fourth round, lost to Laura Gildemeister)
9. (United States) Jennifer Capriati (semifinals, lost to Gabriela Sabatini)
10. (Czechoslovakia) Helena Suková (first round, lost to Gigi Fernández)
11. (France) Nathalie Tauziat (fourth round, lost to Gabriela Sabatini)
12. (Soviet Union) Natasha Zvereva (second round, lost to Linda Harvey-Wild)
13. (Germany) Anke Huber (fourth round, lost to Zina Garrison)
14. (United States) Amy Frazier (fourth round, lost to Steffi Graf)
15. (Italy) Sandra Cecchini (first round, lost to Elizabeth Smylie)
16. (Austria) Judith Wiesner (fourth round, lost to Mary Joe Fernández)

Preceded by 1991 French Open	Grand Slams	Succeeded by 1991 US Open
