= Sarah Bentley =

British tennis player (born 1973)

- Country (sports): United Kingdom
- Born: 8 March 1973 (age 52)
- Prize money: $28,112

Singles
- Highest ranking: No. 269 (15 April 1991)

Grand Slam singles results
- Wimbledon: 1R (1991, 1992)

Doubles
- Highest ranking: No. 385 (29 March 1993)

Sarah Bentley (born 8 March 1973) is a British former professional tennis player.

Bentley qualified for her first WTA Tour tournament at Brighton in 1989 and reached a best singles ranking of No. 269 on the professional tour.

As a wildcard, Bentley twice featured in the main draw at Wimbledon. In 1991, she lost a three set opening round match to Maya Kidowaki, then in 1992 was beaten in the first round by seventh seed Mary Joe Fernandez.

== ITF finals ==
=== Singles (1–2) ===
Outcome	No.	Date	Tournament	Surface	Opponent	Score
Runner-up	1.	22 October 1990	Benin City, Nigeria	Hard	(Netherlands) Petra Kamstra	0–6, 5–7
Runner-up	2.	3 March 1991	Norwich, United Kingdom	Carpet	(Netherlands) Dorien Wamelink	3–6, 3–6
Winner	1.	5 April 1992	Windhoek, Namibia	Hard	(Republic of Ireland) Siobhán Nicholson	6–2, 6–3
