= Zdeňka Málková =

Czech tennis player

- Full name: Zdeňka Málková
- Country (sports): Czech Republic
- Born: 19 January 1975 (age 51) Czechoslovakia
- Turned pro: 1990
- Retired: 1998
- Prize money: $47,665

Singles
- Career record: 113–86
- Career titles: 5 ITF
- Highest ranking: No. 168 (4 May 1992)

Grand Slam singles results
- Australian Open: Q1 (1992)

Doubles
- Career record: 53–31
- Career titles: 6 ITF
- Highest ranking: No. 213 (16 September 1991)

Grand Slam doubles results
- French Open Junior: F (1991)

Zdeňka Málková (born 19 January 1975) is a former Czech tennis player who was crowned 1991 ITF World Champion in girls' singles.

Málková won five singles (including a $50,000 tournament in Karlovy Vary as a 16-year-old) and six doubles titles on the ITF tour during her career. On 4 May 1992, she reached her best singles ranking of world number 168. On 16 September 1991, she peaked at world number 213 in the doubles rankings.

In 1991, Málková was a finalist in the girls' doubles tournament of the French Open. Later that year, she made her WTA tour debut at the OTB Open in Schenectady, New York.

== ITF finals ==
=== Singles (5–3) ===
Legend $100,000 tournaments $75,000 tournaments $50,000 tournaments $25,000 tournaments $10,000 tournaments	Finals by surface Hard (0–0) Clay (5–3) Grass (0–0) Carpet (0–0)

Result	No.	Date	Tournament	Surface	Opponent	Score
Win	1.	15 July 1991	Karlovy Vary, Czechoslovakia	Clay	(Germany) Katja Oeljeklaus	6–4, 2–6, 7–6^{(7–0)}
Win	2.	25 April 1994	Neudörfl, Austria	Clay	(Austria) Petra Schwarz	6–1, 6–2
Loss	1.	13 June 1994	Maribor 1, Slovenia	Clay	(Serbia and Montenegro) Tatjana Ječmenica	1–6, 7–6^{(8–6)}, 3–6
Win	3.	31 July 1995	Horb am Neckar, Germany	Clay	(Slovenia) Tjaša Jezernik	2–6, 6–1, 6–3
Win	4.	8 July 1996	Amersfoort, Netherlands	Clay	(Japan) Tomoe Hotta	6–2, 6–3
Loss	2.	11 November 1996	São Paulo 5, Brazil	Clay	(Argentina) Celeste Contín	3–6, 4–6
Loss	3.	18 November 1996	São Paulo 6, Brazil	Clay	(Kazakhstan) Irina Selyutina	2–6, 4–6
Win	5.	7 April 1997	Galatina, Italy	Clay	(Italy) Laura Fodorean	5–7, 6–4, 6–2

=== Doubles (6–3) ===
Legend $100,000 tournaments $75,000 tournaments $50,000 tournaments $25,000 tournaments $10,000 tournaments	Finals by surface Hard (0–0) Clay (6–3) Grass (0–0) Carpet (0–0)

Result	No.	Date	Tournament	Surface	Partner	Opponents	Score
Win	1.	24 September 1990	Mali Lošinj, Yugoslavia	Clay	(Czechoslovakia) Eva Martincová	(Soviet Union) Anna Mirza (Romania) Irina Spîrlea	6–1, 6–1
Loss	1.	1 October 1990	Šibenik, Yugoslavia	Clay	(Czechoslovakia) Eva Martincová	(Poland) Sylvia Czopek (Poland) Katarzyna Teodorowicz	7–6, 6–7, 6–7
Loss	2.	8 October 1990	Bol, Yugoslavia	Clay	(Czechoslovakia) Eva Martincová	(Poland) Magdalena Feistel (Romania) Irina Spîrlea	6–4, 3–6, 1–6
Loss	3.	25 February 1991	Valencia, Spain	Clay	(Czechoslovakia) Janette Husárová	(Spain) Rosa Bielsa (Spain) Janet Souto	2–6, 3–6
Win	2.	1 April 1991	Šibenik, Yugoslavia	Clay	(Czechoslovakia) Janette Husárová	(Soviet Union) Elena Makarova (Ukraine) Irina Sukhova	6–1, 7–5
Win	3.	8 April 1991	Belgrade, Yugoslavia	Clay	(Czechoslovakia) Janette Husárová	(Socialist Federal Republic of Yugoslavia) Ivona Horvat (Czechoslovakia) Eva Martincová	6–0, 7–6^{(13–11)}
Win	4.	27 July 1992	Rheda-Wiedenbrück, Germany	Clay	(Czechoslovakia) Klára Bláhová	(Czechoslovakia) Eva Martincová (Czechoslovakia) Sylvia Štefková	7–6^{(7–5)}, 6–4
Win	5.	25 April 1994	Neudörfl, Austria	Clay	(Czech Republic) Monika Kratochvílová	(Austria) Désirée Leupold (Austria) Sandra Reichel	6–0, 4–6, 6–1
Win	6.	7 April 1997	Galatina, Italy	Clay	(Czech Republic) Olga Hostáková	(Italy) Laura Fodorean (Romania) Oana Elena Golimbioschi	3–6, 6–2, 6–1

== Junior Grand Slam finals (0–1) ==
=== Girls' doubles ===
Outcome	Year	Championship	Surface	Partner	Opponents	Score
Runner-up	1991	French Open	Clay	(Czechoslovakia) Eva Martincová	(Spain) Eva Bes (Argentina) Inés Gorrochategui	1–6, 3–6
