= Eva Martincová =

Czech tennis player

- Country (sports): Czech Republic
- Born: 4 March 1975 (age 51) Brno, Czechoslovakia
- Height: 1.70 m (5 ft 7 in)
- Turned pro: 1993
- Retired: 2004
- Prize money: $326,219

Singles
- Career record: 194–185
- Career titles: 0 WTA, 1 ITF
- Highest ranking: No. 94 (9 June 1997)

Grand Slam singles results
- Australian Open: Q3 (2002)
- French Open: 1R (1994)
- Wimbledon: 1R (1997)
- US Open: 1R (1994, 1997)

Doubles
- Career record: 218–163
- Career titles: 1 WTA, 16 ITF
- Highest ranking: No. 69 (21 July 1997)

Grand Slam doubles results
- Australian Open: 2R (2000)
- French Open: 2R (1995)
- Wimbledon: 2R (1999)
- US Open: 1R (1997, 1999, 2000)

Eva Martincová (born 4 March 1975 in Brno) is a former Czech tennis player.

Martincová reached a singles ranking high of world No. 94 in June 1997 and even ranked world No. 69 in doubles during a career in which she won one WTA Tour doubles title and a total of 17 ITF tournaments. She made three appearances for the Czech Republic Fed Cup team in the 1990s but without any wins.

== Junior Grand Slam finals ==
=== Girls' doubles ===
Result	Year	Championship	Surface	Partner	Opponents	Score
Loss	1991	French Open	Clay	(Czechoslovakia) Zdeňka Málková	(Spain) Eva Bes (Argentina) Inés Gorrochategui	1–6, 3–6

== WTA Tour finals ==
=== Doubles: 2 (1 title, 1 runner-up) ===
Legend
Grand Slam
Tier I (0–0)
Tier II (0–0)
Tier III (0–0)
Tier IV (1–1)

Result	W–L	Date	Tournament	Surface	Partner	Opponents	Score
Loss	0–1	Jul 1997	Prague Open, Czech Republic	Clay	(Czech Republic) Helena Vildová	(Slovakia) Ruxandra Dragomir (Slovakia) Karina Habšudová	1–6, 7–5, 2–6
Win	1–1	Aug 1999	Knokke-Heist, Belgium	Clay	(Germany) Elena Pampoulova	(Russia) Evgenia Kulikovskaya (Federal Republic of Yugoslavia) Sandra Načuk	3–6, 6–3, 6–3

== ITF finals ==
Legend
$75,000 tournaments
$50,000 tournaments
$25,000 tournaments
$10,000 tournaments

=== Singles (1–2) ===
Result	No.	Date	Location	Surface	Opponent	Score
Win	1.	2 August 1993	Munich, Germany	Clay	(Spain) Eva Jiménez	7–6^{(7–3)}, 6–1
Loss	2.	6 September 1993	Klagenfurt, Austria	Clay	(Czech Republic) Ludmila Richterová	2–6, 2–6
Loss	3.	11 August 1996	Sopot, Poland	Clay	(Czech Republic) Denisa Chládková	3–6, 4–6

=== Doubles (16–22) ===
Result	No.	Date	Location	Surface	Partner	Opponents	Score
Win	1.	24 September 1990	Mali Lošinj, Yugoslavia	Clay	(Czechoslovakia) Zdeňka Málková	(Soviet Union) Anna Mirza (Romania) Irina Spîrlea	6–1, 6–1
Loss	2.	1 October 1990	Šibenik, Yugoslavia	Clay	(Czechoslovakia) Zdeňka Málková	(Poland) Sylvia Czopek (Poland) Katarzyna Teodorowicz	7–6, 6–7, 6–7
Loss	3.	8 October 1990	Bol, Yugoslavia	Clay	(Czechoslovakia) Zdeňka Málková	(Poland) Magdalena Feistel (Romania) Irina Spîrlea	6–4, 3–6, 1–6
Win	4.	15 October 1990	Supetar, Yugoslavia	Clay	(Socialist Federal Republic of Yugoslavia) Ivona Horvat	(Soviet Union) Tatiana Ignatieva (Soviet Union) Irina Sukhova	6–3, 6–3
Loss	5.	18 March 1991	Bol, Yugoslavia	Clay	(Socialist Federal Republic of Yugoslavia) Ivona Horvat	(Denmark) Sofie Albinus (Denmark) Merete Balling-Stockmann	2–6, 3–6
Loss	6.	25 March 1991	Supetar, Yugoslavia	Clay	(Socialist Federal Republic of Yugoslavia) Ivona Horvat	(Czechoslovakia) Dominika Gorecká (Czechoslovakia) Ivana Havrlíková	6–2, 2–6, 5–7
Loss	7.	8 April 1991	Belgrade, Yugoslavia	Clay	(Socialist Federal Republic of Yugoslavia) Ivona Horvat	(Czechoslovakia) Janette Husárová (Czechoslovakia) Zdeňka Málková	0–6, 6–7^{(11–13)}
Win	8.	24 February 1992	Castellón, Spain	Clay	(Czechoslovakia) Pavlína Rajzlová	(Socialist Federal Republic of Yugoslavia) Ivona Horvat (Czechoslovakia) Janette Husárová	7–5, 2–6, 6–1
Loss	9.	30 March 1992	Moulins, France	Clay	(Czechoslovakia) Petra Kučová	(Netherlands) Ingelise Driehuis (Netherlands) Simone Schilder	4–6, 5–7
Loss	10.	20 April 1992	Bari, Italy	Clay	(Czechoslovakia) Kateřina Kroupová-Šišková	(Australia) Justine Hodder (Australia) Kirrily Sharpe	2–6, 3–6
Win	11.	4 August 1992	Stuttgart-Vaihingen, Germany	Clay	(Czechoslovakia) Pavlína Rajzlová	(South Africa) Joannette Kruger (Bulgaria) Elena Pampoulova	6–4, 6–0
Loss	12.	27 July 1992	Rheda-Wiedenbrück, Germany	Clay	(Czechoslovakia) Sylvia Štefková	(Czechoslovakia) Klára Bláhová (Czechoslovakia) Zdeňka Málková	6–7^{(5–7)}, 4–6
Loss	13.	26 October 1992	Saga, Japan	Clay	(Czechoslovakia) Katarína Studeníková	(Japan) Ayako Hirose (Japan) Masako Yanagi	2–6, 0–6
Loss	14.	16 November 1992	Mount Gambier, Australia	Clay	(Czechoslovakia) Janette Husárová	(Australia) Catherine Barclay (Australia) Louise Stacey	6–7^{(7–9)}, 7–6^{(7–4)}, 6–7^{(3–7)}
Win	15.	19 April 1993	Bari, Italy	Clay	(Belgium) Laurence Courtois	(Israel) Yael Segal (Australia) Kirrily Sharpe	2–6, 6–4, 6–1
Win	16.	28 June 1993	Stuttgart-Vaihingen, Germany	Clay	(Czech Republic) Sylvia Štefková	(Slovakia) Denisa Krajčovičová (Slovakia) Katarína Studeníková	6–1 ret.
Loss	17.	15 November 1993	Port Pirie, Australia	Clay	(Slovenia) Tina Križan	(Australia) Lisa McShea (Canada) Vanessa Webb	6–7^{(5)}, 3–6
Win	18.	29 October 1995	Houston, United States	Hard	(Bulgaria) Elena Pampoulova	(United States) Sandra Cacic (Australia) Tracey Rodgers	1–6, 6–2, 6–1
Loss	19.	3 December 1995	Limoges, France	Hard	(Bulgaria) Elena Pampoulova	(Czech Republic) Eva Melicharová (Czech Republic) Helena Vildová	3–6, 6–0, 4–6
Loss	20.	5 February 1996	Würzburg, Germany	Carpet (i)	(Germany) Karin Kschwendt	(Netherlands) Stephanie Gomperts (Netherlands) Stephanie Rottier	2–6, 3–6
Loss	21.	23 June 1996	Bytom, Poland	Clay	(Czech Republic) Lenka Němečková	(Czech Republic) Denisa Chládková (Czech Republic) Radka Pelikánová	6–7, 4–6
Win	22.	14 July 1996	Puchheim, Germany	Clay	(Czech Republic) Alena Vašková	(Germany) Sabine Haas (Czech Republic) Pavlína Rajzlová	6–2, 5–7, 6–1
Loss	23.	22 July 1996	Rostock, Germany	Clay	(Czech Republic) Denisa Chládková	(Austria) Elisabeth Habeler (Poland) Katarzyna Teodorowicz-Lisowska	4–6, 6–4, 1–6
Win	24.	24 November 1996	Nuriootpa, Australia	Hard	(Czech Republic) Alena Vašková	(Australia) Rachel McQuillan (Australia) Kirrily Sharpe	6–3, 6–4
Win	25.	25 October 1998	Joué-lès-Tours, France	Hard (i)	(Czech Republic) Lenka Cenková	(France) Amélie Cocheteux (France) Émilie Loit	3–6, 6–4, 7–5
Loss	26.	30 November 1998	Přerov, Czech Republic	Carpet (i)	(Czech Republic) Olga Blahotová	(Czech Republic) Renata Kučerová (Czech Republic) Libuše Průšová	7–6^{(3)}, 1–6, 2–6
Loss	27.	13 February 1999	Rogaška Slatina, Slovenia	Carpet (i)	(Bulgaria) Svetlana Krivencheva	(Slovenia) Tina Križan (Slovenia) Katarina Srebotnik	5–7, 2–6
Loss	28.	20 June 1999	Marseille, France	Clay	(Czech Republic) Lenka Němečková	(Spain) Gisela Riera (Romania) Raluca Sandu	4–6, 6–7
Loss	29.	5 December 1999	Port Pirie, Australia	Hard	(Czech Republic) Alena Vašková	(Australia) Kerry-Anne Guse (Australia) Lisa McShea	4–6, 1–6
Win	30.	9 July 2000	Stuttgart-Vaihingen, Germany	Clay	(Hungary) Virág Csurgó	(Germany) Andrea Glass (Germany) Jasmin Wöhr	6–2, 2–6, 6–4
Win	31.	8 October 2000	Makarska, Croatia	Clay	(Czech Republic) Alena Vašková	(Croatia) Maja Palaveršić (Slovenia) Maja Matevžič	4–2, 4–1, 2–4, 4–2
Loss	32.	11 June 2001	Grado, Italy	Clay	(Czech Republic) Renata Kučerová	(Croatia) Jelena Kostanić Tošić (Romania) Magda Mihalache	7–5, 3–6, 5–7
Win	33.	3 July 2001	Stuttgart-Vaihingen, Germany	Clay	(Czech Republic) Dája Bedáňová	(Germany) Gréta Arn (Australia) Amanda Grahame	0–6, 6–3, 6–3
Loss	34.	6 May 2002	Edinburgh, UK	Clay	(United Kingdom) Victoria Davies	(Republic of Ireland) Kelly Liggan (Spain) Conchita Martínez Granados	7–5, 0–6, 1–6
Win	35.	16 September 2002	Luxembourg City	Clay	(Czech Republic) Lenka Němečková	(Slovakia) Eva Fislová (Slovakia) Ľubomíra Kurhajcová	6–1, 6–4
Win	36.	27 October 2002	Opole, Poland	Carpet (i)	(Czech Republic) Magdalena Zděnovcová	(Czech Republic) Olga Blahotová (Czech Republic) Gabriela Navrátilová	7–5, 7–6^{(5)}
Win	37.	22 March 2004	Cairo, Egypt	Clay	(Czech Republic) Hana Šromová	(Russia) Raissa Gourevitch (Russia) Ekaterina Kozhokina	6–1, 6–0
Loss	38.	30 May 2004	Biograd, Croatia	Clay	(Czech Republic) Klara Jagosová	(Netherlands) Kika Hogendoorn (Austria) Betina Pirker	2–6, 1–6
