= 1990 Wimbledon Championships – Mixed doubles qualifying =

Mixed doubles qualifying
- 1990 Wimbledon Championships

Events
Singles	men	women		boys	girls
Doubles	men	women	mixed	boys	girls
WC Singles	men	women	quad
WC Doubles	men	women	quad
Legends	men	women	seniors

Qualification
Singles	men	women
Doubles	men	women	mixed
- Wimbledon Championships

Players and pairs who neither have high enough rankings nor receive wild cards may participate in a qualifying tournament held one week before the annual Wimbledon Tennis Championships.

== Seeds ==
1. (United States) Patrick McEnroe / (United States) Meredith McGrath (qualified)
2. (New Zealand) Bruce Derlin / (New Zealand) Julie Richardson (qualified)
3. (United States) Bret Garnett / (Australia) Kristine Radford (qualified)
4. (Canada) Glenn Michibata / (West Germany) Anke Huber (qualifying competition, lucky losers)
5. (United States) Kent Kinnear / (South Africa) Robyn Field (qualifying competition, lucky losers)
6. n/a

== Qualifiers ==
1. (United States) Patrick McEnroe / (United States) Meredith McGrath
2. (New Zealand) Bruce Derlin / (New Zealand) Julie Richardson
3. (United States) Bret Garnett / (Australia) Kristine Radford

== Lucky losers ==
1. (Canada) Glenn Michibata / (West Germany) Anke Huber
2. (United States) Kent Kinnear / (South Africa) Robyn Field
3. (South Africa) Piet Norval / (South Africa) Mariaan de Swardt
4. (South Africa) Lan Bale / (United States) Jane Thomas

== Qualifying draw ==
=== First qualifier ===
First round
1	(United States) Patrick McEnroe (United States) Meredith McGrath	6	6
(South Africa) Craig Campbell (France) Catherine Suire	3	2
(Soviet Union) Andrei Olhovskiy (Soviet Union) Elena Brioukhovets	6	6
(South Africa) Wayne Ferreira (United States) Jennifer Santrock	3	4
(Czechoslovakia) David Rikl (Czechoslovakia) Andrea Strnadová	2	7^{11}	4
(Brazil) Ricardo Camargo (Netherlands) Caroline Vis	6	6^{9}	6
(Australia) Shane Barr (Australia) Tracey Morton	2	3
4	(Canada) Glenn Michibata (West Germany) Anke Huber	6	6

Second round
1	(United States) Patrick McEnroe (United States) Meredith McGrath	6	6
(Soviet Union) Andrei Olhovskiy (Soviet Union) Elena Brioukhovets	3	2
(Brazil) Ricardo Camargo (Netherlands) Caroline Vis	7	5	4
4	(Canada) Glenn Michibata (West Germany) Anke Huber	5	7	6

Qualifying competition
1	(United States) Patrick McEnroe (United States) Meredith McGrath	6	6
4	(Canada) Glenn Michibata (West Germany) Anke Huber	4	4

=== Second qualifier ===
First round
2	(New Zealand) Bruce Derlin (New Zealand) Julie Richardson	6	4	7
(Belgium) Libor Pimek (Australia) Michelle Bowrey	0	6	5
Alt	(Australia) Steve Furlong (Hong Kong) Paulette Moreno	7	6
(Soviet Union) Ģirts Dzelde (Indonesia) Suzanna Anggarkusuma	5	3
(Netherlands) Jan Siemerink (Netherlands) Ingelise Driehuis	6	7
(United States) Mark Keil (United States) Alysia May	1	5
(United States) Craig Johnson (United States) Kimberly Po	4	6^{3}
5	(United States) Kent Kinnear (South Africa) Robyn Field	6	7^{7}

Second round
2	(New Zealand) Bruce Derlin (New Zealand) Julie Richardson	6	6
Alt	(Australia) Steve Furlong (Hong Kong) Paulette Moreno	1	4
(Netherlands) Jan Siemerink (Netherlands) Ingelise Driehuis	6^{1}	6^{8}
5	(United States) Kent Kinnear (South Africa) Robyn Field	7^{7}	7^{10}

Qualifying competition
2	(New Zealand) Bruce Derlin (New Zealand) Julie Richardson	6	6
5	(United States) Kent Kinnear (South Africa) Robyn Field	4	3

=== Third qualifier ===
First round
3	(United States) Bret Garnett (Australia) Kristine Radford	6	7^{7}
(United States) Jonathan Canter (Brazil) Themis Zambrzycki	2	6^{2}
(Denmark) Morten Christensen (United States) Lindsay Bartlett	5	6	1
WC	(United Kingdom) Paul Hand (United Kingdom) Kaye Hand	7	4	6
(United States) Joseph Russell (United States) Shelly Bartlett	5	6^{6}
(South Africa) Lan Bale (United States) Jane Thomas	7	7^{8}
Alt	(United States) Kenny Thorne (Australia) Danielle Jones	w/o
Alt	(South Africa) Piet Norval (South Africa) Mariaan de Swardt

Second round
3	(United States) Bret Garnett (Australia) Kristine Radford	2	6	7
WC	(United Kingdom) Paul Hand (United Kingdom) Kaye Hand	6	4	5
(South Africa) Lan Bale (United States) Jane Thomas	3	6	5
Alt	(South Africa) Piet Norval (South Africa) Mariaan de Swardt	6	3	7

Qualifying competition
3	(United States) Bret Garnett (Australia) Kristine Radford	4	6	6
Alt	(South Africa) Piet Norval (South Africa) Mariaan de Swardt	6	3	4
