= 1990 Wimbledon Championships – Men's doubles qualifying =

Men's doubles qualifying
- 1990 Wimbledon Championships

Events
Singles	men	women		boys	girls
Doubles	men	women	mixed	boys	girls
WC Singles	men	women	quad
WC Doubles	men	women	quad
Legends	men	women	seniors

Qualification
Singles	men	women
Doubles	men	women	mixed
- Wimbledon Championships

Players and pairs who neither have high enough rankings nor receive wild cards may participate in a qualifying tournament held one week before the annual Wimbledon Tennis Championships.

== Seeds ==
1. (South Africa) Royce Deppe / (South Africa) Byron Talbot (qualifying competition, lucky losers)
2. (South Africa) Wayne Ferreira / (South Africa) Piet Norval (qualified)
3. (Italy) Massimo Cierro / (Soviet Union) Ģirts Dzelde (first round)
4. (Sweden) Rikard Bergh / (Sweden) Henrik Holm (qualifying competition, lucky losers)
5. (Australia) Neil Borwick / (New Zealand) David Lewis (first round)
6. (West Germany) Patrick Baur / (West Germany) Christian Saceanu (qualified)
7. (South Africa) Dean Botha / (West Germany) Alexander Mronz (first round)
8. (Soviet Union) Andrei Olhovskiy / (Finland) Olli Rahnasto Second round
9. (New Zealand) Steve Guy / (India) Srinivasan Vasudevan (qualifying competition)
10. (France) Arnaud Boetsch / (France) Guillaume Raoux (qualified)

== Qualifiers ==
1. (France) Arnaud Boetsch / (France) Guillaume Raoux
2. (South Africa) Wayne Ferreira / (South Africa) Piet Norval
3. (Australia) Gavin Pfitzner / (West Germany) Torben Theine
4. (United Kingdom) Paul Hand / (United Kingdom) Chris Wilkinson
5. (West Germany) Patrick Baur / (West Germany) Christian Saceanu

== Lucky losers ==
1. (South Africa) Royce Deppe / (South Africa) Byron Talbot
2. (Sweden) Rikard Bergh / (Sweden) Henrik Holm

== Qualifying draw ==
=== First qualifier ===
First round
1	(South Africa) Royce Deppe (South Africa) Byron Talbot	7^{7}	6
(Australia) Shane Barr (Australia) Jamie Morgan	6^{3}	3
WC	(United Kingdom) Jeffrey Hunter (United Kingdom) Alex Rouse	4	6^{3}
(Australia) Peter Carter (Australia) Steve Furlong	6	7^{7}
(Denmark) Morten Christensen (United States) Kenny Thorne	7^{7}	4	2
(United Kingdom) Daniel Ahl (United Kingdom) Peter Russell	6^{4}	6	6
WC	(United Kingdom) Richard Holden (United Kingdom) Miles Maclagan	4	3
10	(France) Arnaud Boetsch (France) Guillaume Raoux	6	6

Second round
1	(South Africa) Royce Deppe (South Africa) Byron Talbot	6	6^{2}	7
(Australia) Peter Carter (Australia) Steve Furlong	4	7^{7}	5
(United Kingdom) Daniel Ahl (United Kingdom) Peter Russell	1	6^{3}
10	(France) Arnaud Boetsch (France) Guillaume Raoux	6	7^{7}

Qualifying competition
(South Africa) Royce Deppe (South Africa) Byron Talbot	6^{4}	2	3
10	(France) Arnaud Boetsch (France) Guillaume Raoux	7^{7}	6	6

=== Second qualifier ===
First round
2	(South Africa) Wayne Ferreira (South Africa) Piet Norval	7^{7}	6
(India) Zeeshan Ali (Portugal) Nuno Marques	6^{5}	4
(South Africa) Craig Campbell (United States) Arkie Engle
(West Germany) Dirk Dier (Socialist Federal Republic of Yugoslavia) Saša Hiršzon	w/o
WC	(United Kingdom) Gary Engleman (United Kingdom) Ross Matheson	6	6^{4}	4
(United States) Craig Johnson (United States) Mark Keil	3	7^{7}	6
(South Africa) Eddie Edwards (South Africa) Grant Stafford	1	6	3
9	(New Zealand) Steve Guy (India) Srinivasan Vasudevan	6	4	6

Second round
2	(South Africa) Wayne Ferreira (South Africa) Piet Norval	4	6	6
(South Africa) Craig Campbell (United States) Arkie Engle	6	3	3
(United States) Craig Johnson (United States) Mark Keil	6	4	5
9	(New Zealand) Steve Guy (India) Srinivasan Vasudevan	4	6	7

Qualifying competition
2	(South Africa) Wayne Ferreira (South Africa) Piet Norval	6^{4}	6^{5}	6	7	9
(New Zealand) Steve Guy (India) Srinivasan Vasudevan	7^{7}	7^{7}	0	5	7

=== Third qualifier ===
First round
3	(Italy) Massimo Cierro (Soviet Union) Ģirts Dzelde	6^{3}	3
(Australia) Gavin Pfitzner (West Germany) Torben Theine	7^{7}	6
(United Kingdom) David Collins (United Kingdom) Adrian Morgan	4	4
(Jamaica) Doug Burke (Mexico) Luis Herrera	6	6
(Brazil) Ricardo Camargo (Brazil) Alexandre Hocevar	6	6
(United Kingdom) Colin Beecher (United Kingdom) Darren Kirk	4	3
(United States) David Harkness (United States) Joseph Russell	2	6^{3}
8	(Soviet Union) Andrei Olhovskiy (Finland) Olli Rahnasto	6	7^{7}

Second round
(Australia) Gavin Pfitzner (West Germany) Torben Theine	6	6
(Jamaica) Doug Burke (Mexico) Luis Herrera	3	2
(Brazil) Ricardo Camargo (Brazil) Alexandre Hocevar	7^{7}	6
8	(Soviet Union) Andrei Olhovskiy (Finland) Olli Rahnasto	6^{5}	3

Qualifying competition
(Australia) Gavin Pfitzner (West Germany) Torben Theine	6	6	6
(Brazil) Ricardo Camargo (Brazil) Alexandre Hocevar	4	4	4

=== Fourth qualifier ===
First round
4	(Sweden) Rikard Bergh (Sweden) Henrik Holm	6	6
(United States) Paul Koscielski (Canada) Chris Pridham	4	4
(South Africa) Warren Green (Soviet Union) Dimitri Poliakov	3	6^{6}
(South Africa) Lan Bale (South Africa) Brent Haygarth	6	7^{8}
(Sweden) Jan Apell (Sweden) Johan Kjellsten	w/o
(Australia) Darren Patten (Australia) Bret Richardson
(United Kingdom) Paul Hand (United Kingdom) Chris Wilkinson	7	5	7
7	(South Africa) Dean Botha (West Germany) Alexander Mronz	5	7	6

Second round
4	(Sweden) Rikard Bergh (Sweden) Henrik Holm	7	6
(South Africa) Lan Bale (South Africa) Brent Haygarth	5	2
(Australia) Darren Patten (Australia) Bret Richardson	3	4
(United Kingdom) Paul Hand (United Kingdom) Chris Wilkinson	6	6

Qualifying competition
4	(Sweden) Rikard Bergh (Sweden) Henrik Holm	3	6^{3}	6^{1}
(United Kingdom) Paul Hand (United Kingdom) Chris Wilkinson	6	7^{7}	7^{7}

=== Fifth qualifier ===
First round
5	(Australia) Neil Borwick (New Zealand) David Lewis	6^{3}	4
(United Kingdom) Andrew Foster (United Kingdom) David Ireland	7^{7}	6
(Brazil) Otávio Della (United States) Kevin Lubbers	3	4
(Brazil) Ricardo Acioly (South Africa) Earl Zinn	6	6
(Australia) Wayne Arthurs (Australia) Carl Limberger	3	6	8
(Canada) Martin Laurendeau (South Africa) Michael Robertson	6	1	6
(Netherlands) Jacco Eltingh (Netherlands) Jan Siemerink	4	6	3
6	(West Germany) Patrick Baur (West Germany) Christian Saceanu	6	3	6

Second round
(United Kingdom) Andrew Foster (United Kingdom) David Ireland	6	5	10
(Brazil) Ricardo Acioly (South Africa) Earl Zinn	3	7	12
(Australia) Wayne Arthurs (Australia) Carl Limberger	6^{5}	7^{8}	5
6	(West Germany) Patrick Baur (West Germany) Christian Saceanu	7^{7}	6^{6}	7

Qualifying competition
(Brazil) Ricardo Acioly (South Africa) Earl Zinn	7	6	3	2	5
6	(West Germany) Patrick Baur (West Germany) Christian Saceanu	5	4	6	6	7
