= 1992 South African Open – Singles =

Singles
- 1992 South African Open

Final
- Champion: (United States) Aaron Krickstein
- Runner-up: (Commonwealth of Independent States) Alexander Volkov
- Score: 6–4, 6–4

Details
- Draw: 32 (3WC/4Q)
- Seeds: 8

Events
Singles	Doubles
- South African Open

Christo van Rensburg, the last tournament winner in 1989, did not compete this year.

Aaron Krickstein won the title by defeating Alexander Volkov 6–4, 6–4 in the final.

== Seeds ==
1. (Commonwealth of Independent States) Alexander Volkov (final)
2. (Commonwealth of Independent States) Andrei Chesnokov (first round)
3. (South Africa) Wayne Ferreira (semifinals)
4. (United States) Aaron Krickstein (champion)
5. (Argentina) Javier Frana (second round)
6. (United States) Kevin Curren (first round)
7. (Peru) Pablo Arraya (second round)
8. (Sweden) Lars Jönsson (first round)

== Draw ==
Key

- Q = Qualifier
- WC = Wild card
- LL = Lucky loser
- Alt = Alternate
- ITF = ITF entry
- PR = Protected ranking
- SR = Special ranking
- SE = Special exempt
- JE = Junior exempt
- JR = Junior Accelerator Programme entrant
- CO = College Accelerator Programme entrant
- NG = Next Gen Accelerator Program entrant
- w/o = Walkover
- r = Retired
- d = Defaulted

=== Finals ===
Semifinals
1	(Commonwealth of Independent States) Alexander Volkov	6	7^{7}
3	(South Africa) Wayne Ferreira	4	6^{3}
4	(United States) Aaron Krickstein	6	6
(Canada) Chris Pridham	3	4

Final
1	(Commonwealth of Independent States) Alexander Volkov	4	4
4	(United States) Aaron Krickstein	6	6

=== Top half ===
First round
1	(Commonwealth of Independent States) A Volkov	6	6
Q	(South Africa) C Marsh	2	0
(Sweden) P Lundgren	4	1
(Italy) N Bruno	6	6
(Argentina) N Becerra	6^{3}	2
(Australia) C Limberger	7^{7}	6
(Sweden) T Högstedt	3	4
7	(Peru) P Arraya	6	6
3	(South Africa) W Ferreira	6	5	6
Q	(South Africa) JL de Jager	3	7	4
(Czechoslovakia) T Anzari	3	6^{5}
(South Africa) G Stafford	6	7^{7}
(United Kingdom) J Bates	6	6
(Brazil) D Marcelino	2	3
(Belgium) X Daufresne	1	7	7
6	(United States) K Curren	6	5	5

Second round
1	(Commonwealth of Independent States) A Volkov	6	2	6
(Italy) N Bruno	0	6	3
(Australia) C Limberger	7^{7}	4	6
7	(Peru) P Arraya	6^{5}	6	0
3	(South Africa) W Ferreira	6	2	6
(South Africa) G Stafford	4	6	3
(United Kingdom) J Bates	2	5
(Belgium) X Daufresne	6	7

Quarterfinals
1	(Commonwealth of Independent States) A Volkov	6	6
(Australia) C Limberger	3	0
3	(South Africa) W Ferreira	6	6
(Belgium) X Daufresne	3	1

Semifinals
1	(Commonwealth of Independent States) A Volkov	6	7^{7}
3	(South Africa) W Ferreira	4	6^{3}

=== Bottom half ===
First round
5	(Argentina) J Frana	3	6	6
WC	(South Africa) R Koenig	6	2	0
(South Africa) G Muller	7	6
(Israel) G Bloom	5	1
(South Africa) M Ondruska	4	2
(Mexico) L Lavalle	6	6
(Czechoslovakia) V Roubíček	3	1
4	(United States) A Krickstein	6	6
8	(Sweden) L Jönsson	6	1	4
Q	(Spain) D Marco	0	6	6
(Canada) C Pridham	6	7^{7}
WC	(South Africa) N Godwin	2	6^{3}
WC	(Zimbabwe) K Ullyett	7^{7}	6
Q	(United Kingdom) N Broad	6^{3}	2
(Canada) M Laurendeau	7	3	7^{8}
2	(Commonwealth of Independent States) A Chesnokov	5	6	6^{6}

Second round
5	(Argentina) J Frana	4	4
(South Africa) G Muller	6	6
(Mexico) L Lavalle	2	4
4	(United States) A Krickstein	6	6
Q	(Spain) D Marco	6	5	6^{0}
(Canada) C Pridham	4	7	7^{7}
WC	(Zimbabwe) K Ullyett	6	7^{11}
(Canada) M Laurendeau	2	6^{9}

Quarterfinals
(South Africa) G Muller	2	2
4	(United States) A Krickstein	6	6
(Canada) C Pridham	0	6	7
WC	(Zimbabwe) K Ullyett	6	3	5

Semifinals
4	(United States) A Krickstein	6	6
(Canada) C Pridham	3	4
