= 1992 South African Open – Doubles =

Doubles
- 1992 South African Open

Final
- Champions: (South Africa) Pieter Aldrich (South Africa) Danie Visser
- Runners-up: (South Africa) Wayne Ferreira (South Africa) Piet Norval
- Score: 6–4, 6–4

Details
- Draw: 16 (2WC/1Q)
- Seeds: 4

Events
Singles	Doubles
- South African Open

Luke Jensen and Richey Reneberg, the last tournament winners in 1989, did not compete this year. Jensen chose to compete at Estoril during the same week, finishing as runner-up in doubles.

In an all-south african final, Pieter Aldrich and Danie Visser won the title by defeating Wayne Ferreira and Piet Norval 6–4, 6–4 in the final.

== Seeds ==
1. (Argentina) Javier Frana / (Mexico) Leonardo Lavalle (quarterfinals)
2. (South Africa) Wayne Ferreira / (South Africa) Piet Norval (final)
3. (United States) Kevin Curren / (South Africa) Gary Muller (semifinals)
4. (United Kingdom) Jeremy Bates / (United Kingdom) Neil Broad (quarterfinals)

== Draw ==
Key

- Q = Qualifier
- WC = Wild card
- LL = Lucky loser
- Alt = Alternate
- ITF = ITF entry
- PR = Protected ranking
- SR = Special ranking
- SE = Special exempt
- JE = Junior exempt
- JR = Junior Accelerator Programme entrant
- CO = College Accelerator Programme entrant
- NG = Next Gen Accelerator Program entrant
- w/o = Walkover
- r = Retired
- d = Defaulted

=== Draw ===
First round
1	(Argentina) J Frana (Mexico) L Lavalle	6	7
(Sweden) P Lundgren (Commonwealth of Independent States) A Volkov	2	6
(South Africa) P Alrdich (South Africa) D Visser	7	7
(Australia) C Limberger (Czechoslovakia) T Anzari	6	6
3	(United States) K Curren (South Africa) G Muller	6	4	6
Q	(Canada) M Laurendeau (Canada) C Pridham	2	6	1
(South Africa) M Ondruska (South Africa) G Stafford	4	6	7
(South Africa) M Barnard (Israel) G Bloom	6	4	6
(Peru) P Arraya (Belgium) X Daufresne	7	1	7
WC	(South Africa) R Koenig (South Africa) C Marsh	6	6	6
WC	(South Africa) N Godwin (South Africa) G Williams	6	4
4	(United Kingdom) J Bates (United Kingdom) N Broad	7	6
(South Africa) J de Beer (South Africa) JL de Jager	6	6
(Argentina) M Ingaramo (Brazil) D Marcelino	4	4
(South Africa) R Deppe (South Africa) S Kruger	5	6	6
2	(South Africa) W Ferreira (South Africa) P Norval	7	4	7

Quarterfinals
1	(Argentina) J Frana (Mexico) L Lavalle	5	3
(South Africa) P Alrdich (South Africa) D Visser	7	6
3	(United States) K Curren (South Africa) G Muller	7	6	6
(South Africa) M Ondruska (South Africa) G Stafford	6	7	2
(Peru) P Arraya (Belgium) X Daufresne	6	3	6
4	(United Kingdom) J Bates (United Kingdom) N Broad	2	6	3
(South Africa) J de Beer (South Africa) JL de Jager	6	6
2	(South Africa) W Ferreira (South Africa) P Norval	7	7

Semifinals
(South Africa) P Alrdich (South Africa) D Visser	2	6	6
3	(United States) K Curren (South Africa) G Muller	6	4	4
(Peru) P Arraya (Belgium) X Daufresne	6	6
2	(South Africa) W Ferreira (South Africa) P Norval	7	7

Final
(South Africa) P Alrdich (South Africa) D Visser	6	6
2	(South Africa) W Ferreira (South Africa) P Norval	4	4
