= 1990 Wimbledon Championships – Women's doubles qualifying =

Women's doubles qualifying
- 1990 Wimbledon Championships

Events
Singles	men	women		boys	girls
Doubles	men	women	mixed	boys	girls
WC Singles	men	women	quad
WC Doubles	men	women	quad
Legends	men	women	seniors

Qualification
Singles	men	women
Doubles	men	women	mixed
- Wimbledon Championships

Players and pairs who neither have high enough rankings nor receive wild cards may participate in a qualifying tournament held one week before the annual Wimbledon Tennis Championships.

== Seeds ==
1. (Netherlands) Ingelise Driehuis / (Netherlands) Caroline Vis (qualified)
2. (United States) Donna Faber / (United States) Shaun Stafford (second round)
3. (Australia) Kate McDonald / (Australia) Tracey Morton (qualified)
4. (United States) Alysia May / (United States) Kimberly Po (second round)
5. (United States) Lea Antonoplis / (Sweden) Maria Strandlund (qualifying competition, lucky losers)
6. (Finland) Anne Aallonen / (Luxembourg) Karin Kschwendt (first round)
7. (Republic of Ireland) Lesley O'Halloran / (United States) Jane Thomas (second round)
8. (Australia) Michelle Bowrey / (South Africa) Robyn Field (first round)

== Qualifiers ==
1. (Netherlands) Ingelise Driehuis / (Netherlands) Caroline Vis
2. (Australia) Kerry-Anne Guse / (Australia) Justine Hodder
3. (Australia) Kate McDonald / (Australia) Tracey Morton
4. (Australia) Nicole Pratt / (Australia) Kirrily Sharpe

== Lucky losers ==
1. (United States) Lea Antonoplis / (Sweden) Maria Strandlund
2. (Belgium) Ann Devries / (Australia) Kristin Godridge

== Qualifying draw ==
=== First qualifier ===
First round
1	(Netherlands) Ingelise Driehuis (Netherlands) Caroline Vis	6	6
(United States) Kate Gompert (United States) Anna Ivan	3	4
(South Africa) Elna Reinach (South Africa) Mariaan de Swardt	6	6
(Indonesia) Suzanna Anggarkusuma (Indonesia) Yayuk Basuki	4	3
WC	(United Kingdom) Alison Hill (United Kingdom) Nina Topper	6^{6}	7^{9}	6
(West Germany) Barbara Rittner (Australia) Clare Thompson	7^{8}	6^{7}	8
(Japan) Emiko Okagawa (Japan) Naoko Sato	1	7^{7}	7
6	(Finland) Anne Aallonen (Luxembourg) Karin Kschwendt	6	6^{5}	5

Second round
1	(Netherlands) Ingelise Driehuis (Netherlands) Caroline Vis	6	3	7
(South Africa) Elna Reinach (South Africa) Mariaan de Swardt	2	6	5
(West Germany) Barbara Rittner (Australia) Clare Thompson	6	6
(Japan) Emiko Okagawa (Japan) Naoko Sato	1	1

Qualifying competition
1	(Netherlands) Ingelise Driehuis (Netherlands) Caroline Vis	6	6
(West Germany) Barbara Rittner (Australia) Clare Thompson	1	2

=== Second qualifier ===
First round
4	(United States) Alysia May (United States) Kimberly Po	6	6
(Socialist Federal Republic of Yugoslavia) Sabrina Goleš (United Kingdom) Lesley Parnell	2	2
(Sweden) Eva Lena Olsson (Sweden) Jenny Tielman	3	1
(Australia) Kerry-Anne Guse (Australia) Justine Hodder	6	6
(Canada) Teresa Dobson (Namibia) Elizma Nortje	4	6	4
(New Zealand) Ruth Seeman (Brazil) Themis Zambrzycki	6	3	6
(United Kingdom) Amanda Grunfeld (United Kingdom) Kaye Hand	4	3
5	(United States) Lea Antonoplis (Sweden) Maria Strandlund	6	6

Second round
4	(United States) Alysia May (United States) Kimberly Po	2	6	2
(Australia) Kerry-Anne Guse (Australia) Justine Hodder	6	4	6
(New Zealand) Ruth Seeman (Brazil) Themis Zambrzycki	1	7	1
5	(United States) Lea Antonoplis (Sweden) Maria Strandlund	6	5	6

Qualifying competition
(Australia) Kerry-Anne Guse (Australia) Justine Hodder	6	4	6
(United States) Lea Antonoplis (Sweden) Maria Strandlund	3	6	4

=== Third qualifier ===
First round
8	(Australia) Michelle Bowrey (South Africa) Robyn Field	6	6^{7}	3
(United Kingdom) Caroline Billingham (United Kingdom) Alexandra Niepel	0	7^{9}	6
(United States) Lindsay Bartlett (United States) Shelly Bartlett	5	1
(Belgium) Ann Devries (Australia) Kristin Godridge	7	6
(Australia) Danielle Jones (Hong Kong) Paulette Moreno	6	7
(United States) Allison Cooper (United States) Ginger Helgeson	4	5
WC	(United Kingdom) Lisa Gould (United Kingdom) Valda Lake	3	4
3	(Australia) Kate McDonald (Australia) Tracey Morton	6	6

Second round
(United Kingdom) Caroline Billingham (United Kingdom) Alexandra Niepel	1	1
(Belgium) Ann Devries (Australia) Kristin Godridge	6	6
(Australia) Danielle Jones (Hong Kong) Paulette Moreno	6	3	3
3	(Australia) Kate McDonald (Australia) Tracey Morton	3	6	6

Qualifying competition
(Belgium) Ann Devries (Australia) Kristin Godridge	4	2
3	(Australia) Kate McDonald (Australia) Tracey Morton	6	6

=== Fourth qualifier ===
First round
7	(Republic of Ireland) Lesley O'Halloran (United States) Jane Thomas	6	6
(Israel) Yael Segal (Netherlands) Jackie van Wijk	4	2
(United Kingdom) Katie Rickett (United Kingdom) Alison Smith	6	2	4
(Australia) Nicole Pratt (Australia) Kirrily Sharpe	1	6	6
(United States) Carrie Cunningham (United States) Erika deLone	4	6^{2}
(Australia) Catherine Barclay (Australia) Louise Stacey	6	7^{7}
(Netherlands) Gaby Coorengel (Netherlands) Amy van Buuren	6	6^{2}	5
2	(United States) Donna Faber (United States) Shaun Stafford	2	7^{7}	7

Second round
7	(Republic of Ireland) Lesley O'Halloran (United States) Jane Thomas	2	6^{6}
(Australia) Nicole Pratt (Australia) Kirrily Sharpe	6	7^{8}
(Australia) Catherine Barclay (Australia) Louise Stacey	6	7
2	(United States) Donna Faber (United States) Shaun Stafford	3	5

Qualifying competition
(Australia) Nicole Pratt (Australia) Kirrily Sharpe	7^{7}	6
(Australia) Catherine Barclay (Australia) Louise Stacey	6^{4}	1
