= 1989 South African Open – Singles =

Singles
- 1989 South African Open

Final
- Champion: (South Africa) Christo van Rensburg
- Runner-up: (United States) Paul Chamberlin
- Score: 6–4, 7–6, 6–3

Details
- Draw: 32
- Seeds: 8

Events
Singles	Doubles
← 1988 ·	South African Open	· 1990 →

Jakob Hlasek was the defending champion but did not compete that year.

Christo van Rensburg won in the final 6–4, 7–6, 6–3 against Paul Chamberlin.

== Seeds ==
1. (United States) Jay Berger (second round)
2. (United States) Kevin Curren (second round)
3. (South Africa) Christo van Rensburg (champion)
4. (Italy) Paolo Canè (first round)
5. (Israel) Amos Mansdorf (first round)
6. n/a
7. (United States) Todd Witsken (first round)
8. (United States) Scott Davis (first round)

== Draw ==
=== Key ===
- Q = Qualifier
- WC = Wild card
- LL = Lucky loser
- Alt = Alternate
- SE = Special exempt
- PR = Protected ranking
- ITF = ITF entry
- JE = Junior exempt
- w/o = Walkover
- r = Retired
- d = Defaulted
- SR = Special ranking

=== Final ===
Semifinals
(United States) Paul Chamberlin	7	6
LL	(United States) Joey Rive	6	3
3	(South Africa) Christo van Rensburg	6	6
(United Kingdom) Jeremy Bates	3	4

Final
(United States) Paul Chamberlin	4	6	3
3	(South Africa) Christo van Rensburg	6	7	6

=== Section 1 ===
First round
1	(United States) J Berger	7	7
(United States) M Davis	6	5
Q	(United States) M Robertson	6	4	6
(United States) L Shiras	0	6	0
(Australia) S Youl	5	6
(United States) P Chamberlin	7	7
(United States) K Jones	4	6	6
8	(United States) S Davis	6	1	4
4	(Italy) P Canè	3	0	r
(United States) R Van't Hof	6	2
(United States) P Johnson	4	3
(South Africa) G Muller	6	6
WC	(South Africa) R Deppe	6	7	6
(United States) M Anger	7	6	4
(West Germany) A Mronz	6	3	4
LL	(United States) J Rive	4	6	6

Second round
1	(United States) J Berger	6	4	1
Q	(United States) M Robertson	3	6	6
(United States) P Chamberlin	6	6
(United States) S Davis	3	3
(United States) R Van't Hof	4	4
(South Africa) G Muller	6	6
WC	(South Africa) R Deppe	6	6
LL	(United States) J Rive	7	7

Quarterfinals
Q	(United States) M Robertson	4	5
(United States) P Chamberlin	6	7
(South Africa) G Muller	3	3
LL	(United States) J Rive	6	6

Semifinals
(United States) P Chamberlin	7	6
LL	(United States) J Rive	6	3

=== Section 2 ===
First round
5	(Israel) A Mansdorf	3	3
Q	(United States) D Pate	6	6
(South Africa) P Aldrich	6	2
(United States) R Reneberg	7	6
(South Africa) D Visser	4	7	4
(Italy) F Cancellotti	6	6	6
WC	(South Africa) J-L de Jager	1	3
3	(South Africa) C van Rensburg	6	6
7	(United States) T Witsken	6	6
Q	(United Kingdom) N Broad	7	7
(Australia) B Drewett	1	6
(United Kingdom) J Bates	6	7
Q	(South Africa) D Botha	4	6	7
(Australia) J Fitzgerald	6	3	5
Q	(South Africa) M Kaplan	5	7	6
2	(United States) K Curren	7	5	7

Second round
Q	(United States) D Pate	6	6
(United States) R Reneberg	4	2
(Italy) F Cancellotti	2	0
3	(South Africa) C van Rensburg	6	6
(United Kingdom) N Broad	1	4
(United Kingdom) J Bates	6	6
Q	(South Africa) D Botha	w/o
2	(United States) K Curren

Quarterfinals
Q	(United States) D Pate	6	2
3	(South Africa) C van Rensburg	7	6
(United Kingdom) J Bates	6	6
Q	(South Africa) D Botha	4	4

Semifinals
3	(South Africa) C van Rensburg	6	6
(United Kingdom) J Bates	3	4
