= 1990 Wimbledon Championships – Men's singles qualifying =

Men's singles qualifying
- 1990 Wimbledon Championships

Events
Singles	men	women		boys	girls
Doubles	men	women	mixed	boys	girls
WC Singles	men	women	quad
WC Doubles	men	women	quad
Legends	men	women	seniors

Qualification
Singles	men	women
Doubles	men	women	mixed
- Wimbledon Championships

Players and pairs who neither have high enough rankings nor receive wild cards may participate in a qualifying tournament held one week before the annual Wimbledon Tennis Championships.

== Seeds ==
1. (France) Thierry Champion (first round, retired)
2. (Australia) Todd Woodbridge (qualifying competition, lucky loser)
3. (Canada) Martin Laurendeau (first round)
4. (Sweden) David Engel (first round)
5. (West Germany) Alexander Mronz (first round)
6. (Spain) Carlos Costa (qualifying competition, lucky loser)
7. (West Germany) Christian Saceanu (first round)
8. (Australia) Broderick Dyke (qualifying competition, lucky loser)
9. (Portugal) Nuno Marques (qualifying competition)
10. (West Germany) Patrick Baur (second round)
11. (Canada) Chris Pridham (first round)
12. (South Africa) Danie Visser (qualified)
13. (South Africa) Pieter Aldrich (second round)
14. (Australia) Neil Borwick (second round)
15. (Italy) Gianluca Pozzi (second round)
16. (Italy) Massimo Cierro (second round)
17. (Netherlands) Jan Siemerink (first round)
18. (West Germany) Christian Geyer (first round)
19. (Nigeria) Nduka Odizor (qualifying competition)
20. (United States) Patrick McEnroe (first round)
21. (Italy) Diego Nargiso (first round)
22. (South Korea) Kim Bong-soo (first round)
23. (United States) Jonathan Canter (first round)
24. (South Africa) Wayne Ferreira (qualified)
25. (New Zealand) Steve Guy (first round)
26. (France) Guillaume Raoux (qualified)
27. (Netherlands) Menno Oosting (second round)
28. (United States) Ken Flach (qualified)
29. (South Africa) Michael Robertson (qualified)
30. (United States) Robert Seguso (second round)
31. (Brazil) Fernando Roese (first round)
32. (Japan) Shuzo Matsuoka (qualified)

== Qualifiers ==
1. (Japan) Shuzo Matsuoka
2. (West Germany) Andreas Lesch
3. (South Africa) Michael Robertson
4. (United States) Rick Leach
5. (West Germany) Dirk Dier
6. (United States) Ken Flach
7. (India) Vijay Amritraj
8. (France) Guillaume Raoux
9. (Sweden) Henrik Holm
10. (South Africa) Wayne Ferreira
11. (Mexico) Luis Herrera
12. (South Africa) Danie Visser
13. (Soviet Union) Dimitri Poliakov
14. (Netherlands) Ralph Kok
15. (United Kingdom) Neil Broad
16. (Sweden) Ronnie Båthman

== Lucky losers ==
1. (Australia) Todd Woodbridge
2. (Spain) Carlos Costa
3. (Australia) Broderick Dyke

== Qualifying draw ==
=== First qualifier ===
First round
1	(France) Thierry Champion	5^{r}
(South Africa) Dean Botha	5
(Austria) Gerald Mandl	6^{5}	2
(Netherlands) Sander Groen	7^{7}	6
(West Germany) Dirk Leppen	1	4
(South Africa) Stefan Kruger	6	6
(South Africa) Brent Haygarth	5	6^{10}
32	(Japan) Shuzo Matsuoka	7	7^{12}

Second round
(South Africa) Dean Botha	6	6^{4}	10
(Netherlands) Sander Groen	3	7^{7}	12
(South Africa) Stefan Kruger	3	1
32	(Japan) Shuzo Matsuoka	6	6

Qualifying competition
(Netherlands) Sander Groen	6^{3}	3	6	3
32	(Japan) Shuzo Matsuoka	7^{7}	6	4	6

=== Second qualifier ===
First round
2	(Australia) Todd Woodbridge	7^{7}	6
(United Kingdom) Nick Fulwood	6^{5}	4
(United States) Mark Keil	7	6
(Brazil) Nelson Aerts	5	4
(West Germany) Andreas Lesch	6	6
(Sweden) Thomas Haldin	3	4
(India) Srinivasan Vasudevan	3	7	8
31	(Brazil) Fernando Roese	6	5	6

Second round
2	(Australia) Todd Woodbridge	6	6^{6}	6
(United States) Mark Keil	4	7^{8}	4
(West Germany) Andreas Lesch	6	6^{5}	6
(India) Srinivasan Vasudevan	3	7^{7}	3

Qualifying competition
(Australia) Todd Woodbridge	7^{7}	2	4	6^{5}
(West Germany) Andreas Lesch	6^{5}	6	6	7^{7}

=== Third qualifier ===
First round
3	(Canada) Martin Laurendeau	6	2	6
(South Africa) Marcos Ondruska	3	6	8
(United States) Jared Palmer	2	6^{5}
(Kenya) Paul Wekesa	6	7^{7}
WC	(United Kingdom) Paul Hand	6	6
(South Africa) Craig Campbell	0	4
(Israel) Michael Daniel	2	4
29	(South Africa) Michael Robertson	6	6

Second round
(South Africa) Marcos Ondruska	6	4	9
(Kenya) Paul Wekesa	4	6	7
WC	(United Kingdom) Paul Hand	6^{7}	2
29	(South Africa) Michael Robertson	7^{9}	6

Qualifying competition
(South Africa) Marcos Ondruska	4	3	3
29	(South Africa) Michael Robertson	6	6	6

=== Fourth qualifier ===
First round
4	(Sweden) David Engel	4	6^{5}
(United States) Rick Leach	6	7^{7}
(France) Stéphane Sansoni	5	3
(South Africa) Byron Talbot	7	6
(The Bahamas) Roger Smith	3	6	6
(Brazil) Otávio Della	6	1	4
(Australia) David Macpherson	4	6	6
30	(United States) Robert Seguso	6	2	8

Second round
(United States) Rick Leach	7^{7}	3	6
(South Africa) Byron Talbot	6^{3}	6	3
(The Bahamas) Roger Smith	6	3	8
30	(United States) Robert Seguso	4	6	6

Qualifying competition
(United States) Rick Leach	7	7^{7}	6^{5}	5	6
(The Bahamas) Roger Smith	5	6^{5}	7^{7}	7	4

=== Fifth qualifier ===
First round
5	(West Germany) Alexander Mronz	4	6^{2}
(Sweden) Ville Jansson	6	7^{7}
(West Germany) Dirk Dier	6	6
(Peru) Alejandro Aramburú	4	4
(Mexico) Eduardo Vélez	6	6
WC	(United Kingdom) Alex Rouse	2	1
(South Africa) Lan Bale	6	2	3
27	(Netherlands) Menno Oosting	4	6	6

Second round
(Sweden) Ville Jansson	0	2
(West Germany) Dirk Dier	6	6
(Mexico) Eduardo Vélez	6	3	6
27	(Netherlands) Menno Oosting	4	6	3

Qualifying competition
(West Germany) Dirk Dier	6^{4}	7^{7}	7	6
(Mexico) Eduardo Vélez	7^{7}	6^{4}	5	3

=== Sixth qualifier ===
First round
6	(Spain) Carlos Costa	7^{7}	6
(Brazil) Mauro Menezes	6^{5}	3
WC	(United Kingdom) Gary Engleman	6	4	8
(Brazil) José Daher	3	6	6
(Argentina) Francisco Yunis	4	6	6
(New Zealand) David Lewis	6	3	6
(Australia) Jamie Morgan	6^{1}	6	3
28	(United States) Ken Flach	7^{7}	4	6

Second round
6	(Spain) Carlos Costa	6	7^{7}
WC	(United Kingdom) Gary Engleman	4	6^{4}
(New Zealand) David Lewis	4	1
28	(United States) Ken Flach	6	6

Qualifying competition
6	(Spain) Carlos Costa	3	1	5
28	(United States) Ken Flach	6	6	7

=== Seventh qualifier ===
First round
7	(West Germany) Christian Saceanu	3	6^{3}
Alt	(United States) Mark Buckley	6	7^{7}
(Brazil) Alexandre Hocevar	4	6^{4}
(United Kingdom) Stephen Botfield	6	7^{7}
(India) Vijay Amritraj	1	6	6
(France) Éric Winogradsky	6	3	3
(France) Stéphane Grenier	7^{11}	7^{7}
25	(New Zealand) Steve Guy	6^{9}	6^{5}

Second round
Alt	(United States) Mark Buckley	4	4
(United Kingdom) Stephen Botfield	6	6
(India) Vijay Amritraj	6	6
(France) Stéphane Grenier	3	0

Qualifying competition
(United Kingdom) Stephen Botfield	6	4	4	4
(India) Vijay Amritraj	3	6	6	6

=== Eighth qualifier ===
First round
8	(Australia) Broderick Dyke	6	7^{7}
(India) Zeeshan Ali	2	6^{4}
(New Zealand) Bruce Derlin	7^{7}	7^{7}
(Colombia) Mario Rincón	6^{2}	6^{5}
(South Africa) Royce Deppe	3	2
(Finland) Olli Rahnasto	6	6
(Australia) Russell Barlow	4	3
26	(France) Guillaume Raoux	6	6

Second round
8	(Australia) Broderick Dyke	4	6	6
(New Zealand) Bruce Derlin	6	2	3
(Finland) Olli Rahnasto	4	6^{7}
26	(France) Guillaume Raoux	6	7^{9}

Qualifying competition
8	(Australia) Broderick Dyke	3	4	2
(France) Guillaume Raoux	6	6	6

=== Ninth qualifier ===
First round
9	(Portugal) Nuno Marques	6	6
WC	(United Kingdom) Ross Matheson	1	4
(Brazil) Jaime Oncins	6^{5}	2
(Argentina) Javier Frana	7^{7}	6
(Brazil) Danilo Marcelino	4	4
(Mexico) Leonardo Lavalle	6	6
(Sweden) Henrik Holm	4	6	7
23	(United States) Jonathan Canter	6	3	5

Second round
9	(Portugal) Nuno Marques	7	6
(Argentina) Javier Frana	5	3
(Mexico) Leonardo Lavalle	4	3
(Sweden) Henrik Holm	6	6

Qualifying competition
9	(Portugal) Nuno Marques	4	4	7^{7}	6	4
(Sweden) Henrik Holm	6	6	6^{3}	3	6

=== Tenth qualifier ===
First round
10	(West Germany) Patrick Baur	3	7^{7}	6
(Netherlands) Jacco Eltingh	6	6^{5}	3
(Canada) Glenn Michibata	6	6
(West Germany) Hans Schwaier	3	2
(United States) Joseph Russell	3	6^{5}
WC	(United Kingdom) Jason Goodall	6	7^{7}
(Sweden) Jan Apell	4	1
24	(South Africa) Wayne Ferreira	6	6

Second round
10	(West Germany) Patrick Baur	4	3
(Canada) Glenn Michibata	6	6
WC	(United Kingdom) Jason Goodall	4	4
24	(South Africa) Wayne Ferreira	6	6

Qualifying competition
(Canada) Glenn Michibata	6^{9}	3	3
24	(South Africa) Wayne Ferreira	7^{11}	6	6

=== Eleventh qualifier ===
First round
11	(Canada) Chris Pridham	5	6	11
(Mexico) Luis Herrera	7	1	13
(Czechoslovakia) Cyril Suk	7^{9}	3	5
WC	(United Kingdom) Nigel Russell	6^{7}	6	7
(Sweden) Johan Kjellsten	2	2
(Australia) Brad Drewett	6	6
(United States) Greg Van Emburgh	2	7	6
22	(South Korea) Kim Bong-soo	6	5	1

Second round
(Mexico) Luis Herrera	6	4	6
WC	(United Kingdom) Nigel Russell	3	6	2
(Australia) Brad Drewett	4	6	6
(United States) Greg Van Emburgh	6	4	3

Qualifying competition
(Mexico) Luis Herrera	6	3	6	7^{9}
(Australia) Brad Drewett	4	6	2	6^{7}

=== Twelfth qualifier ===
First round
12	(South Africa) Danie Visser	6	6
(United States) John Ross	4	1
(United States) Steve DeVries	6	1	10
(South Africa) Grant Stafford	3	6	8
(Soviet Union) Andrei Olhovskiy	6	7^{13}
(South Africa) Piet Norval	3	6^{11}
(France) Arnaud Boetsch	7	6
21	(Italy) Diego Nargiso	5	2

Second round
12	(South Africa) Danie Visser	7	3	17
(United States) Steve DeVries	5	6	15
(Soviet Union) Andrei Olhovskiy	6	3	9
(France) Arnaud Boetsch	3	6	11

Qualifying competition
12	(South Africa) Danie Visser	6	6	6
(France) Arnaud Boetsch	3	2	3

=== Thirteenth qualifier ===
First round
13	(South Africa) Pieter Aldrich	6	6
(Argentina) Guillermo Rivas	2	4
WC	(United Kingdom) Miles Maclagan	3	7^{7}	4
(Soviet Union) Dimitri Poliakov	6	6^{4}	6
WC	(United Kingdom) Chris Wilkinson	3	6	6
(Australia) Peter Doohan	6	4	3
(Mexico) Francisco Maciel	6	6
20	(United States) Patrick McEnroe	4	4

Second round
13	(South Africa) Pieter Aldrich	0	3
(Soviet Union) Dimitri Poliakov	6	6
WC	(United Kingdom) Chris Wilkinson	6	6
(Mexico) Francisco Maciel	4	3

Qualifying competition
(Soviet Union) Dimitri Poliakov	6	3	6	7^{7}
WC	(United Kingdom) Chris Wilkinson	3	6	3	6^{4}

=== Fourteenth qualifier ===
First round
14	(Australia) Neil Borwick	6	6
(Jamaica) Doug Burke	3	2
(Netherlands) Ralph Kok	7^{7}	7^{7}
(Australia) Carl Limberger	6^{5}	6^{2}
(Australia) Shane Barr	7^{7}	6
(Spain) Germán López	6^{2}	4
(Czechoslovakia) David Rikl	3	2
19	(Nigeria) Nduka Odizor	6	6

Second round
14	(Australia) Neil Borwick	6^{6}	1
(Netherlands) Ralph Kok	7^{8}	6
(Australia) Shane Barr	6^{1}	6^{3}
19	(Nigeria) Nduka Odizor	7^{7}	7^{7}

Qualifying competition
(Netherlands) Ralph Kok	6	7^{7}	4	4	8
19	(Nigeria) Nduka Odizor	4	6^{4}	6	6	6

=== Fifteenth qualifier ===
First round
15	(Italy) Gianluca Pozzi	6	7^{7}
(United States) Paul Koscielski	3	6^{5}
(United Kingdom) Neil Broad	3	6	6
(United States) David Harkness	6	3	4
(United States) Arkie Engle	6^{5}	4
(United States) Kenny Thorne	7^{7}	6
(Netherlands) Hendrik Jan Davids	6	7
18	(West Germany) Christian Geyer	3	5

Second round
15	(Italy) Gianluca Pozzi	4	4
(United Kingdom) Neil Broad	6	6
(United States) Kenny Thorne	6	6
(Netherlands) Hendrik Jan Davids	4	1

Qualifying competition
(United Kingdom) Neil Broad	7^{7}	6	3	6
(United States) Kenny Thorne	6^{3}	1	6	3

=== Sixteenth qualifier ===
First round
16	(Italy) Massimo Cierro	6	6
WC	(United Kingdom) Andrew Foster	4	2
(United States) Craig Johnson	5	4
(United States) Kent Kinnear	7	6
(West Germany) Torben Theine	6	6^{1}	6
(Belgium) Libor Pimek	2	7^{7}	8
(Sweden) Ronnie Båthman	6	4	6
17	(Netherlands) Jan Siemerink	3	6	4

Second round
16	(Italy) Massimo Cierro	7	1	2
(United States) Kent Kinnear	5	6	6
(Belgium) Libor Pimek	6^{4}	2
(Sweden) Ronnie Båthman	7^{7}	6

Qualifying competition
(United States) Kent Kinnear	1	4	1
(Sweden) Ronnie Båthman	6	6	6
