= 1990 Wimbledon Championships – Women's singles qualifying =

Women's singles qualifying
- 1990 Wimbledon Championships

Events
Singles	men	women		boys	girls
Doubles	men	women	mixed	boys	girls
WC Singles	men	women	quad
WC Doubles	men	women	quad
Legends	men	women	seniors

Qualification
Singles	men	women
Doubles	men	women	mixed
- Wimbledon Championships

Players and pairs who neither have high enough rankings nor receive wild cards may participate in a qualifying tournament held one week before the annual Wimbledon Tennis Championships.

== Seeds ==
1. (Australia) Michelle Jaggard (second round)
2. (Poland) Renata Barański (qualifying competition, lucky loser)
3. (France) Pascale Etchemendy (qualifying competition, lucky loser)
4. (Czechoslovakia) Iva Budařová (second round)
5. (Australia) Kristin Godridge (first round)
6. (France) Pascale Paradis (first round)
7. (United States) Jennifer Santrock (qualifying competition, lucky loser)
8. (Australia) Kirrily Sharpe (second round)
9. (Luxembourg) Karin Kschwendt (qualified)
10. (United States) Katrina Adams (qualified)
11. (West Germany) Eva Pfaff (qualified)
12. (Canada) Carling Bassett-Seguso (first round)
13. (Soviet Union) Elena Brioukhovets (qualified)
14. (Netherlands) Hellas ter Riet (second round)
15. (Canada) Jill Hetherington (first round)
16. (United States) Kate Gompert (first round)

== Qualifiers ==
1. (Belgium) Ann Devries
2. (Luxembourg) Karin Kschwendt
3. (West Germany) Eva Pfaff
4. (United States) Heather Ludloff
5. (Soviet Union) Elena Brioukhovets
6. (United States) Katrina Adams
7. (Australia) Rennae Stubbs
8. (South Africa) Robyn Field

== Lucky losers ==
1. (United States) Anna Ivan
2. (France) Pascale Etchemendy
3. (United States) Jennifer Santrock
4. (Poland) Renata Barański

== Qualifying draw ==
=== First qualifier ===
First round
1	(Australia) Michelle Jaggard	6	6
(Netherlands) Carin Bakkum	3	4
(Australia) Kate McDonald	4	6	6
(France) Catherine Suire	6	1	2
(Belgium) Ann Devries	6	6
(Australia) Janine Tremelling	4	3
WC	(United Kingdom) Susheel Gulati	6^{4}	6^{5}
14	(Netherlands) Hellas ter Riet	7^{7}	7^{7}

Second round
1	(Australia) Michelle Jaggard	6	6^{3}	6
(Australia) Kate McDonald	2	7^{7}	8
(Belgium) Ann Devries	6	6
14	(Netherlands) Hellas ter Riet	4	0

Qualifying competition
(Australia) Kate McDonald	6	3	0
(Belgium) Ann Devries	3	6	6

=== Second qualifier ===
First round
9	(Luxembourg) Karin Kschwendt	6	6
WC	(United Kingdom) Katie Rickett	0	3
(Netherlands) Caroline Vis	2	4
(United Kingdom) Valda Lake	6	6
(Japan) Emiko Okagawa	6	7
(United States) Karen Shin	3	5
WC	(United Kingdom) Teresa Catlin	7^{7}	6
5	(Australia) Kristin Godridge	6^{3}	1

Second round
9	(Luxembourg) Karin Kschwendt	6	7
(United Kingdom) Valda Lake	4	5
(Japan) Emiko Okagawa	6	6
WC	(United Kingdom) Teresa Catlin	4	0

Qualifying competition
9	(Luxembourg) Karin Kschwendt	7^{7}	7^{7}
(Japan) Emiko Okagawa	6^{2}	6^{3}

=== Third qualifier ===
First round
4	(Czechoslovakia) Iva Budařová	6	6
(United States) Ginger Helgeson	4	2
(Australia) Kristine Radford	3	4
(Australia) Nicole Pratt	6	6
(United States) Louise Allen	6	6
(France) Valérie Batut	4	1
WC	(United Kingdom) Alison Hill	3	3
11	(West Germany) Eva Pfaff	6	6

Second round
4	(Czechoslovakia) Iva Budařová	3	2
(Australia) Nicole Pratt	6	6
(United States) Louise Allen	3	4
11	(West Germany) Eva Pfaff	6	6

Qualifying competition
(Australia) Nicole Pratt	7	4	3
11	(West Germany) Eva Pfaff	5	6	6

=== Fourth qualifier ===
First round
16	(United States) Kate Gompert	4	4
(South Africa) Lise Gregory	6	6
(United States) Heather Ludloff	4	6	6
(New Zealand) Julie Richardson	6	4	4
(Australia) Tracey Morton	7^{7}	6
(Israel) Yael Segal	6^{3}	1
(United States) Erika deLone	6	3	3
8	(Australia) Kirrily Sharpe	4	6	6

Second round
(South Africa) Lise Gregory	4	7	10
(United States) Heather Ludloff	6	5	12
(Australia) Tracey Morton	7^{7}	6
8	(Australia) Kirrily Sharpe	6^{4}	3

Qualifying competition
(United States) Heather Ludloff	6	6
(Australia) Tracey Morton	4	2

=== Fifth qualifier ===
First round
6	(France) Pascale Paradis	3	6	3
(Japan) Misumi Miyauchi	6	2	6
(United States) Anna Ivan	6	6
WC	(United Kingdom) Sarah Bentley	2	1
(United States) Kimberly Po	2	1
(Australia) Jenny Byrne	6	6
(Australia) Michelle Bowrey	4	5
13	(Soviet Union) Elena Brioukhovets	6	7

Second round
(Japan) Misumi Miyauchi	2	6^{3}
(United States) Anna Ivan	6	7^{7}
(Australia) Jenny Byrne	6	4	4
13	(Soviet Union) Elena Brioukhovets	4	6	6

Qualifying competition
(United States) Anna Ivan	2	5
13	(Soviet Union) Elena Brioukhovets	6	7

=== Sixth qualifier ===
First round
10	(United States) Katrina Adams	6	7^{7}
(South Africa) Mariaan de Swardt	4	6^{2}
(United States) Sandy Collins	3	2
(Denmark) Tine Scheuer-Larsen	6	6
(Japan) Kumiko Okamoto	4	6	10
WC	(United Kingdom) Amanda Grunfeld	6	1	8
WC	(United Kingdom) Caroline Billingham	3	3
3	(France) Pascale Etchemendy	6	6

Second round
10	(United States) Katrina Adams	2	6	6
(Denmark) Tine Scheuer-Larsen	6	3	4
(Japan) Kumiko Okamoto	3	6	4
3	(France) Pascale Etchemendy	6	2	6

Qualifying competition
10	(United States) Katrina Adams	6	6
3	(France) Pascale Etchemendy	3	0

=== Seventh qualifier ===
First round
7	(United States) Jennifer Santrock	6	6
(Hungary) Réka Szikszay	3	2
(Czechoslovakia) Andrea Strnadová	3	7^{7}	10
(United States) Beth Herr	6	6^{5}	8
(West Germany) Barbara Rittner	5	6	3
(Australia) Rennae Stubbs	7	4	6
(United States) Akiko Gooden	3	6	6
15	(Canada) Jill Hetherington	6	2	3

Second round
7	(United States) Jennifer Santrock	6	6
(Czechoslovakia) Andrea Strnadová	4	4
(Australia) Rennae Stubbs	6^{5}	6	6
(United States) Akiko Gooden	7^{7}	2	3

Qualifying competition
7	(United States) Jennifer Santrock	6^{6}	4
(Australia) Rennae Stubbs	7^{8}	6

=== Eighth qualifier ===
First round
12	(Canada) Carling Bassett-Seguso	3	7^{7}	3
(South Africa) Robyn Field	6	6^{2}	6
(Indonesia) Yayuk Basuki	6	6
WC	(United Kingdom) Kaye Hand	4	4
(Sweden) Maria Lindström	6	6
(Finland) Anne Aallonen	1	2
(United States) Laxmi Poruri	6	3	1
2	(Poland) Renata Barański	4	6	6

Second round
(South Africa) Robyn Field	6	7^{10}
(Indonesia) Yayuk Basuki	4	6^{8}
(Sweden) Maria Lindström	4	6	2
2	(Poland) Renata Barański	6	4	6

Qualifying competition
(South Africa) Robyn Field	7	6
2	(Poland) Renata Barański	5	1
