= 1989 South African Open – Doubles =

Doubles
- 1989 South African Open

Final
- Champions: (United States) Luke Jensen (United States) Richey Reneberg
- Runners-up: (United States) Kelly Jones (United States) Joey Rive
- Score: 6–0, 6–4

Events
Singles	Doubles
← 1988 ·	South African Open	· 1990 →

Kevin Curren and David Pate were the defending champions but only Pate competed that year with Jeremy Bates.

Bates and Pate lost in the first round to John Fitzgerald and Todd Witsken.

Luke Jensen and Richey Reneberg won in the final 6–0, 6–4 against Kelly Jones and Joey Rive.

== Seeds ==
1. (South Africa) Pieter Aldrich / (South Africa) Danie Visser (semifinals)
2. (Australia) John Fitzgerald / (United States) Todd Witsken (quarterfinals)
3. (United States) Martin Davis / (United States) Scott Davis (first round)
4. (United Kingdom) Neil Broad / (South Africa) Gary Muller (quarterfinals)

== Draw ==
=== Key ===
- Q = Qualifier
- WC = Wild card
- LL = Lucky loser
- Alt = Alternate
- SE = Special exempt
- PR = Protected ranking
- ITF = ITF entry
- JE = Junior exempt
- w/o = Walkover
- r = Retired
- d = Defaulted
- SR = Special ranking

First round
1	(South Africa) P Aldrich (South Africa) D Visser	6	6
(South Africa) M Robertson (Australia) S Youl	4	4
(West Germany) P Ballauff (West Germany) A Mronz	6	6
(Italy) P Canè (Italy) U Colombini	3	4
4	(South Africa) N Broad (South Africa) G Muller	7	6	6
(United States) P Chamberlin (United States) L Shiras	6	7	3
(South Africa) R Deppe (South Africa) B Talbot	7	3	6
(United States) L Jensen (United States) R Reneberg	6	6	7
(United States) M Anger (United States) R Van't Hof	1	7	3
(United States) K Jones (United States) J Rive	6	6	6
(Australia) B Drewett (Australia) L Warder	6	5	6
3	(United States) M Davis (United States) S Davis	4	7	2
(South Africa) E Edwards (South Africa) S Kruger	6	3	7
(South Africa) W Ferreira (South Africa) G Stafford	4	6	5
(United Kingdom) J Bates (United States) D Pate	3	6
2	(Australia) J Fitzgerald (United States) T Witsken	6	7

Quarterfinals
1	(South Africa) P Aldrich (South Africa) D Visser	6	6
(West Germany) P Ballauff (West Germany) A Mronz	1	4
4	(South Africa) N Broad (South Africa) G Muller	3	3
(United States) L Jensen (United States) R Reneberg	6	6
(United States) K Jones (United States) J Rive	4	7	6
(Australia) B Drewett (Australia) L Warder	6	6	2
(South Africa) E Edwards (South Africa) S Kruger	3	6	7
2	(Australia) J Fitzgerald (United States) T Witsken	6	2	5

Semifinals
1	(South Africa) P Aldrich (South Africa) D Visser	7	4	6
(United States) L Jensen (United States) R Reneberg	6	6	7
(United States) K Jones (United States) J Rive	6	6
(South Africa) E Edwards (South Africa) S Kruger	2	4

Final
(United States) L Jensen (United States) R Reneberg	6	6
(United States) K Jones (United States) J Rive	0	4
