= 1993 ABN AMRO World Tennis Tournament – Singles =

Singles
- 1993 ABN AMRO World Tennis Tournament

Final
- Champion: (Sweden) Anders Järryd
- Runner-up: (Czech Republic) Karel Nováček
- Score: 6–3, 7–5

Details
- Draw: 32
- Seeds: 8

Events
Singles	Doubles
- ABN AMRO World Tennis Tournament

Boris Becker was the defending champion, but chose not to participate that year.

Anders Järryd won the final of the singles event of the ABN AMRO World Tennis Tournament, defeating Karel Nováček 6–3, 7–5.

== Seeds ==
1. (Germany) Boris Becker (withdrew)
2. (Croatia) Goran Ivanišević (quarterfinals)
3. (United States) Ivan Lendl (withdrew)
4. (Netherlands) Richard Krajicek (first round)
5. (Russia) Alexander Volkov (semifinals)
6. (Sweden) Henrik Holm (second round)
7. (Czech Republic) Karel Nováček (final)
8. (South Africa) Wayne Ferreira (first round)

== Draw ==
Key

- Q = Qualifier
- WC = Wild card
- LL = Lucky loser
- Alt = Alternate
- ITF = ITF entry
- PR = Protected ranking
- SR = Special ranking
- SE = Special exempt
- JE = Junior exempt
- JR = Junior Accelerator Programme entrant
- CO = College Accelerator Programme entrant
- NG = Next Gen Accelerator Program entrant
- w/o = Walkover
- r = Retired
- d = Defaulted

=== Finals ===
Semifinals
7	(Czech Republic) Karel Nováček	6	6
Q	(Italy) Diego Nargiso	3	4
5	(Russia) Alexander Volkov	3	7	3
WC	(Sweden) Anders Järryd	6	6^{6}	6

Final
7	(Czech Republic) Karel Nováček	3	5
WC	(Sweden) Anders Järryd	6	7

=== Top half ===
First round
LL	(Czech Republic) D Vacek	4	7	1
(Netherlands) J Siemerink	6	6^{4}	6
(Denmark) K Carlsen	6	7
(Sweden) C Bergström	4	5
(Netherlands) J Eltingh	3	6	2
Q	(Netherlands) T Nijssen	6	4	6
(Ukraine) A Medvedev	0	4
7	(Czech Republic) K Nováček	6	6
LL	(Netherlands) R Kok	6	6
(Germany) P Kühnen	4	4
(Italy) O Camporese	6	6
Q	(United Kingdom) J Bates	2	0
(France) O Delaître	2	4
Q	(Italy) D Nargiso	6	6
(Sweden) J Svensson	3	2
6	(Sweden) H Holm	6	6

Second round
(Netherlands) J Siemerink	6	6^{3}	4
(Denmark) K Carlsen	4	7	6
Q	(Netherlands) T Nijssen	2	0
7	(Czech Republic) K Nováček	6	6
LL	(Netherlands) R Kok	2	2
(Italy) O Camporese	6	6
Q	(Italy) D Nargiso	3	6	6
6	(Sweden) H Holm	6	3	3

Quarterfinals
(Denmark) K Carlsen	4	4
7	(Czech Republic) K Nováček	6	6
(Italy) O Camporese	6^{4}	6^{3}
Q	(Italy) D Nargiso	7	7

Semifinals
7	(Czech Republic) K Nováček	6	6
Q	(Italy) D Nargiso	3	4

=== Bottom half ===
First round
5	(Russia) A Volkov	6	6
WC	(Netherlands) M Schapers	2	4
WC	(Netherlands) F Wibier	6	6
(Belgium) B Wuyts	2	4
(Italy) G Pozzi	3	6	5
(Russia) A Olhovskiy	6	0	7
(Croatia) G Prpić	6	6
4	(Netherlands) R Krajicek	4	4
8	(South Africa) W Ferreira	2	4
WC	(Sweden) A Järryd	6	6
Q	(Slovakia) K Kučera	7	4	2
(Netherlands) P Haarhuis	5	6	6
(Israel) A Mansdorf	6	2	6
(New Zealand) B Steven	0	6	2
(Spain) F Roig	4	5
2	(Croatia) G Ivanišević	6	7

Second round
5	(Russia) A Volkov	6	6
WC	(Netherlands) F Wibier	3	4
(Russia) A Olhovskiy	2	3
(Croatia) G Prpić	6	6
WC	(Sweden) A Järryd	6	6
(Netherlands) P Haarhuis	3	4
(Israel) A Mansdorf	4	7	6^{5}
2	(Croatia) G Ivanišević	6	5	7

Quarterfinals
5	(Russia) A Volkov	6	6
(Croatia) G Prpić	2	2
WC	(Sweden) A Järryd	6	6
2	(Croatia) G Ivanišević	3	4

Semifinals
5	(Russia) A Volkov	3	7	3
WC	(Sweden) A Järryd	6	6^{6}	6
