= 1989 ABN World Tennis Tournament – Singles =

Singles
- 1989 ABN World Tennis Tournament
- 1988 Champion: (Sweden) Stefan Edberg

Final
- Champion: (Switzerland) Jakob Hlasek
- Runner-up: (Sweden) Anders Järryd
- Score: 6–1, 7–5

Details
- Draw: 32
- Seeds: 8

Events
Singles	Doubles
← 1988 ·	ABN World Tennis Tournament	· 1990 →

Stefan Edberg was the defending champion but did not compete that year.

Jakob Hlasek won in the final 6–1, 7–5 against Anders Järryd.

== Seeds ==
A champion seed is indicated in bold text while text in italics indicates the round in which that seed was eliminated.

1. (Czechoslovakia) Miloslav Mečíř (first round)
2. (Switzerland) **Jakob Hlasek (champion)**
3. (France) Yannick Noah (semifinals)
4. (Sweden) Jonas Svensson (first round)
5. (Australia) John Fitzgerald (first round)
6. (Australia) Darren Cahill (semifinals)
7. (Sweden) Anders Järryd (final)
8. (Sweden) Magnus Gustafsson (second round)

== Draw ==
=== Key ===
- Q = Qualifier
- WC = Wild card
- LL = Lucky loser
- Alt = Alternate
- SE = Special exempt
- PR = Protected ranking
- ITF = ITF entry
- JE = Junior exempt
- w/o = Walkover
- r = Retired
- d = Defaulted
- SR = Special ranking

First round
1	(Czechoslovakia) M Mečíř	5	1
WC	(West Germany) **P Kühnen**	**7**	**6**
Q	(Socialist Federal Republic of Yugoslavia) M Ostoja	3	2
(Netherlands) **M Schapers**	**6**	**6**
(Sweden) J Gunnarsson	3	4
(Australia) **W Masur**	**6**	**6**
WC	(Netherlands) M Koevermans	3	1
7	(Sweden) **A Järryd**	**6**	**6**
4	(Sweden) J Svensson	2	4
(United States) **M Davis**	**6**	**6**
Q	(West Germany) M Westphal	5	6
(Mexico) **L Lavalle**	**7**	**7**
(Switzerland) C Mezzadri	**7**	2	2
(West Germany) **C Saceanu**	6	**6**	**6**
(Mexico) J Lozano	2	**7**	3
6	(Australia) **D Cahill**	**6**	6	**6**
5	(Australia) J Fitzgerald	3	**6**	2
(Finland) **O Rahnasto**	**6**	3	**6**
(West Germany) **U Riglewski**	**6**	**6**
(Belgium) E Masso	3	0
(Czechoslovakia) M Šrejber	4	**6**	3
(Sweden) **C Bergström**	**6**	4	**6**
WC	(Netherlands) T Nijssen	3	2
3	(France) **Y Noah**	**6**	**6**
8	(Sweden) **M Gustafsson**	**6**	**6**
(Italy) D Nargiso	4	4
Q	(West Germany) A Lesch	2	4
(West Germany) **E Jelen**	**6**	**6**
(Italy) **P Canè**	**6**	3	**7**
Q	(Netherlands) R Kok	3	**6**	6
(Sweden) T Svantesson	6	2
2	(Switzerland) **J Hlasek**	**7**	**6**

Second round
WC	(West Germany) P Kühnen	0	6
(Netherlands) **M Schapers**	**6**	**7**
(Australia) W Masur	2	1
7	(Sweden) **A Järryd**	**6**	**6**
(United States) **M Davis**	**6**	**6**
(Mexico) L Lavalle	2	3
(West Germany) C Saceanu	6	6
6	(Australia) **D Cahill**	**7**	**7**
(Finland) O Rahnasto	3	**6**	1
(West Germany) **U Riglewski**	**6**	2	**6**
(Sweden) C Bergström	3	5
3	(France) **Y Noah**	**6**	**7**
8	(Sweden) M Gustafsson	3	2
(West Germany) **E Jelen**	**6**	**6**
(Italy) P Canè	2	1
2	(Switzerland) **J Hlasek**	**6**	**6**

Quarterfinals
(Netherlands) M Schapers	**7**	1	3
7	(Sweden) **A Järryd**	6	**6**	**6**
(United States) M Davis	3	6
6	(Australia) **D Cahill**	**6**	**7**
(West Germany) U Riglewski	1	5
3	(France) **Y Noah**	**6**	**7**
(West Germany) E Jelen	1	1
2	(Switzerland) **J Hlasek**	**6**	**6**

Semifinals
7	(Sweden) **A Järryd**	**6**	**6**
6	(Australia) D Cahill	2	4
3	(France) Y Noah	6	2
2	(Switzerland) **J Hlasek**	**7**	**6**

Final
7	(Sweden) Anders Järryd	1	5
2	(Switzerland) **Jakob Hlasek**	**6**	**7**
