= Daniel Marco =

Spanish tennis player (born 1966)

- Full name: Daniel Marco
- Country (sports): Spain
- Born: 31 January 1966 (age 59); Tangier, Morocco
- Height: 5 ft 10 in (178 cm)
- Plays: Right-handed
- Prize money: $57,893

Singles
- Career record: 1–1
- Highest ranking: No. 184 (28 September 1992)

Doubles
- Highest ranking: No. 265 (16 November 1992)

Daniel Marco (born 31 January 1966) is a former professional tennis player from Spain.

== Biography ==
Marco grew up in the Moroccan city of Tangier, where he was born in 1966. The son of a competitive swimmer, Marco moved to Marbella in 1986 and was based there during his career.

His only ATP Tour main draw appearance came at the 1992 South African Open in Johannesburg. He beat Lars Jonsson in the first round, then lost in the round of 16 to Chris Pridham, in a third set tiebreak.

At Challenger level he won a title in Bogota in 1992 and the same year had a win over Pat Rafter at the Sevilla Challenger.

== Challenger titles ==
=== Singles: (1) ===
No.	Year	Tournament	Surface	Opponent	Score
1.	1992	Bogotá, Colombia	Clay	(Canada) Andrew Sznajder	7–6, 3–6, 6–4
