= 1989 ABN World Tennis Tournament – Doubles =

Doubles
- 1989 ABN World Tennis Tournament
- 1988 Champions: (West Germany) Patrik Kühnen (West Germany) Tore Meinecke

Final
- Champions: (Czechoslovakia) Miloslav Mečíř (Czechoslovakia) Milan Šrejber
- Runners-up: (Sweden) Jan Gunnarsson (Sweden) Magnus Gustafsson
- Score: 7–6, 6–0

Details
- Draw: 16
- Seeds: 4

Events
Singles	Doubles
- ABN World Tennis Tournament

Patrik Kühnen and Tore Meinecke were the defending champions but they competed with different partners that year, Kühnen with Udo Riglewski and Meinecke with Ricki Osterthun.

Kühnen and Riglewski lost in the first round to Darren Cahill and Laurie Warder.

Meinecke and Osterthun lost in the quarterfinals to Jan Gunnarsson and Magnus Gustafsson.

Miloslav Mečíř and Milan Šrejber won in the final 7–6, 6–0 against Gunnarsson and Gustafsson.

== Seeds ==
Champion seeds are indicated in bold text while text in italics indicates the round in which those seeds were eliminated.

1. (Australia) John Fitzgerald / (Sweden) Anders Järryd (first round)
2. (Australia) Darren Cahill / (Australia) Laurie Warder (semifinals)
3. (Australia) Wally Masur / (Netherlands) Tom Nijssen (first round)
4. (United States) Martin Davis / (Sweden) Tobias Svantesson (first round)

== Draw ==
Key

- Q = Qualifier
- WC = Wild card
- LL = Lucky loser
- Alt = Alternate
- ITF = ITF entry
- PR = Protected ranking
- SR = Special ranking
- SE = Special exempt
- JE = Junior exempt
- JR = Junior Accelerator Programme entrant
- CO = College Accelerator Programme entrant
- NG = Next Gen Accelerator Program entrant
- w/o = Walkover
- r = Retired
- d = Defaulted

First round
1	(Australia) J Fitzgerald (Sweden) A Järryd	**6**	1	5
(Netherlands) **M Oosting** (Netherlands) **J Vekemans**	2	**6**	**7**
(Italy) P Canè (Italy) D Nargiso	**7**	3	3
(Netherlands) **M Koevermans** (Netherlands) **H van Boeckel**	6	**6**	**6**
3	(Australia) W Masur (Netherlands) T Nijssen	3	4
(Czechoslovakia) **M Mečíř** (Czechoslovakia) **M Šrejber**	**6**	**6**
(West Germany) **E Jelen** (West Germany) **C Saceanu**	**6**	**6**
(Mexico) L Lavalle (Netherlands) M Schapers	3	4
(Switzerland) C Mezzadri (Switzerland) S Mezzadri	6	**6**	4
(West Germany) **T Meinecke** (West Germany) **R Osterthun**	**7**	2	**6**
(Sweden) **J Gunnarsson** (Sweden) **M Gustafsson**	**7**	4	**7**
4	(United States) M Davis (Sweden) T Svantesson	6	**6**	6
(Czechoslovakia) J Čihák (Belgium) L Pimek	6	**7**	0
(Sweden) **C Bergström** (Netherlands) **R Kok**	**7**	6	**6**
(West Germany) P Kühnen (West Germany) U Riglewski	6	4
2	(Australia) **D Cahill** (Australia) **L Warder**	**7**	**6**

Quarterfinals
(Netherlands) **M Oosting** (Netherlands) **J Vekemans**	**6**	**6**
(Netherlands) M Koevermans (Netherlands) H van Boeckel	4	3
(Czechoslovakia) **M Mečíř** (Czechoslovakia) **M Šrejber**	4	**7**	**7**
(West Germany) E Jelen (West Germany) C Saceanu	**6**	6	5
(West Germany) T Meinecke (West Germany) R Osterthun	2	**6**	3
(Sweden) **J Gunnarsson** (Sweden) **M Gustafsson**	**6**	3	**6**
(Sweden) C Bergström (Netherlands) R Kok	3	2
2	(Australia) **D Cahill** (Australia) **L Warder**	**6**	**6**

Semifinals
(Netherlands) M Oosting (Netherlands) J Vekemans	4	**7**	6
(Czechoslovakia) **M Mečíř** (Czechoslovakia) **M Šrejber**	**6**	6	**7**
(Sweden) **J Gunnarsson** (Sweden) **M Gustafsson**	**6**	**7**
2	(Australia) D Cahill (Australia) L Warder	3	5

Final
(Czechoslovakia) **Miloslav Mečíř** (Czechoslovakia) **Milan Šrejber**	**7**	**6**
(Sweden) Jan Gunnarsson (Sweden) Magnus Gustafsson	6	0
