= 1993 ABN AMRO World Tennis Tournament – Doubles =

Doubles
- 1993 ABN AMRO World Tennis Tournament

Final
- Champions: (Sweden) Henrik Holm (Sweden) Anders Järryd
- Runners-up: (South Africa) David Adams (Russia) Andrei Olhovskiy
- Score: 6–4, 7–6

Details
- Draw: 16
- Seeds: 4

Events
Singles	Doubles
- ABN AMRO World Tennis Tournament

Marc-Kevin Goellner and David Prinosil were the defending champions, but chose not to participate that year.

Henrik Holm and Anders Järryd won in the final 6–4, 7–6, against David Adams and Andrei Olhovskiy.

== Seeds ==
1. (Netherlands) Tom Nijssen / (Czech Republic) Cyril Suk (first round)
2. (United States) Steve DeVries / (Australia) David Macpherson (first round)
3. (Netherlands) Jacco Eltingh / (Netherlands) Paul Haarhuis (quarterfinals)
4. (South Africa) David Adams / (Russia) Andrei Olhovskiy (final)

== Draw ==
Key

- Q = Qualifier
- WC = Wild card
- LL = Lucky loser
- Alt = Alternate
- ITF = ITF entry
- PR = Protected ranking
- SR = Special ranking
- SE = Special exempt
- JE = Junior exempt
- JR = Junior Accelerator Programme entrant
- CO = College Accelerator Programme entrant
- NG = Next Gen Accelerator Program entrant
- w/o = Walkover
- r = Retired
- d = Defaulted

=== Draw ===
First round
1	(Netherlands) T Nijssen (Czech Republic) C Suk	3	1
(Sweden) H Holm (Sweden) A Järryd	6	6
(Netherlands) M Oosting (Germany) U Riglewski	3	3
WC	(Netherlands) R Krajicek (Netherlands) J Siemerink	6	6
3	(Netherlands) J Eltingh (Netherlands) P Haarhuis	7	6
(Czech Republic) V Flegl (Germany) P Kühnen	5	2
(Czech Republic) T Anzari (Spain) F Roig	6	3	6
(Italy) O Camporese (Italy) D Nargiso	1	6	7
(Netherlands) HJ Davids (Belgium) L Pimek	6	7
(United Kingdom) J Bates (Czech Republic) K Nováček	4	5
WC	(Netherlands) R Kok (Netherlands) H Troost	6	5	3
4	(South Africa) D Adams (Russia) A Olhovskiy	3	7	6
(Sweden) R Båthman (Norway) B-O Pedersen	3	4
(South Africa) G Muller (South Africa) P Norval	6	6
Q	(Sweden) P Nyborg (Finland) O Rahnasto	6	6
2	(United States) S DeVries (Australia) D Macpherson	4	3

Quarterfinals
(Sweden) H Holm (Sweden) A Järryd	6	7
WC	(Netherlands) R Krajicek (Netherlands) J Siemerink	4	5
3	(Netherlands) J Eltingh (Netherlands) P Haarhuis	4	7	4
(Italy) O Camporese (Italy) D Nargiso	6	6	6
(Netherlands) HJ Davids (Belgium) L Pimek	5	2
4	(South Africa) D Adams (Russia) A Olhovskiy	7	6
(South Africa) G Muller (South Africa) P Norval	6	5	7
Q	(Sweden) P Nyborg (Finland) O Rahnasto	1	7	6

Semifinals
(Sweden) H Holm (Sweden) A Järryd	7	6
(Italy) O Camporese (Italy) D Nargiso	5	4
4	(South Africa) D Adams (Russia) A Olhovskiy	6	6	7
(South Africa) G Muller (South Africa) P Norval	7	1	6

Final
(Sweden) H Holm (Sweden) A Järryd	4	6
4	(South Africa) D Adams (Russia) A Olhovskiy	6	7
