= 1990 Australian Open – Women's singles qualifying =

Women's singles qualifying
- 1990 Australian Open

Events
Singles	men	women		boys	girls
Doubles	men	women	mixed	boys	girls
WC Singles	men	women	quad
WC Doubles	men	women	quad
Legends	men	women	mixed

Qualification
Singles	men	women
- Australian Open

This article displays the qualifying draw for women's singles at the 1990 Australian Open.

== Seeds ==
1. (Japan) Yukie Koizumi (second round)
2. (United Kingdom) Clare Wood (qualified)
3. (United States) Karen Shin (second round)
4. (West Germany) Silke Frankl (second round)
5. (United States) Sandy Collins (second round)
6. (Mexico) Angélica Gavaldón (qualified)
7. -
8. (Australia) Lisa O'Neill (second round)
9. (France) Alexia Dechaume-Balleret (qualifying competition, lucky loser)
10. (United Kingdom) Amanda Grunfeld (qualifying competition)
11. (Austria) Ulrike Priller (qualifying competition)
12. (Japan) Tamaka Takagi (qualifying competition)
13. (Czechoslovakia) Andrea Strnadová (second round)
14. (Japan) Masako Yanagi (qualifying competition)
15. (Sweden) Maria Ekstrand (second round)

== Qualifiers ==
1. (South Africa) Lise Gregory
2. (West Germany) Eva-Maria Schürhoff
3. (United Kingdom) Sarah Loosemore
4. (West Germany) Steffi Menning
5. (Mexico) Angélica Gavaldón
6. (United States) Jill Smoller
7. (United States) Erika deLone
8. (United Kingdom) Clare Wood

== Lucky losers ==
1. (France) Alexia Dechaume-Balleret

== Qualifying draw ==
Key

- Q = Qualifier
- WC = Wild card
- LL = Lucky loser
- Alt = Alternate
- ITF = ITF entry
- PR = Protected ranking
- SR = Special ranking
- SE = Special exempt
- JE = Junior exempt
- JR = Junior Accelerator Programme entrant
- CO = College Accelerator Programme entrant
- NG = Next Gen Accelerator Program entrant
- w/o = Walkover
- r = Retired
- d = Defaulted

=== First qualifier ===
First round
(Netherlands) Simone Schilder	1	6	1
(South Africa) Lise Gregory	6	4	6
WC	(Australia) Jane Taylor	4	6	1
WC	(Australia) Angie Woolcock	6	3	6

Second round
1	(Japan) Yukie Koizumi	1	4
(South Africa) Lise Gregory	6	6
WC	(Australia) Angie Woolcock	1	4
9	(France) Alexia Dechaume-Balleret	6	6

Qualifying competition
(South Africa) Lise Gregory	6	6
9	(France) Alexia Dechaume-Balleret	1	2

=== Second qualifier ===
First round
(New Zealand) Hana Guy	4	0
(United States) Akiko Gooden	6	6
(West Germany) Eva-Maria Schürhoff	6	7^{7}
(United States) Anne Grousbeck	3	6^{4}

Second round
13	(Czechoslovakia) Andrea Strnadová	3	4
(United States) Akiko Gooden	6	6
(West Germany) Eva-Maria Schürhoff	6	7^{7}
5	(United States) Sandy Collins	3	6^{3}

Qualifying competition
(United States) Akiko Gooden	1	3
(West Germany) Eva-Maria Schürhoff	6	6

=== Third qualifier ===
First round
(United Kingdom) Sarah Loosemore	6	6
(Netherlands) Caroline Vis	1	0
(Israel) Rona Mayer	3	3
WC	(Australia) Sharon McNamara	6	6

Second round
3	(United States) Karen Shin	4	2
(United Kingdom) Sarah Loosemore	6	6
WC	(Australia) Sharon McNamara	0	2
11	(Austria) Ulrike Priller	6	6

Qualifying competition
(United Kingdom) Sarah Loosemore	6	6
11	(Austria) Ulrike Priller	4	3

=== Fourth qualifier ===
First round
(New Zealand) Julie Richardson	2	1
(Japan) Ei Iida	6	6
(New Zealand) Claudine Toleafoa	3	4
WC	(Australia) Michelle Bowrey	6	6

Second round
(West Germany) Steffi Menning	6	6
(Japan) Ei Iida	4	4
WC	(Australia) Michelle Bowrey	6	6
Alt	(Israel) Limor Zaltz	2	3

Qualifying competition
(West Germany) Steffi Menning	5	6	6
WC	(Australia) Michelle Bowrey	7	3	4

=== Fifth qualifier ===
First round
(Bulgaria) Magdalena Maleeva	6	6
(Australia) Elizabeth Minter	3	4
(Brazil) Themis Zambrzycki	1	7	0
(Austria) Heidi Sprung	6	5	6

Second round
6	(Mexico) Angélica Gavaldón	4	6	6
(Bulgaria) Magdalena Maleeva	6	4	2
(Austria) Heidi Sprung	2	6^{3}
12	(Japan) Tamaka Takagi	6	7^{7}

Qualifying competition
6	(Mexico) Angélica Gavaldón	6	6
12	(Japan) Tamaka Takagi	3	0

=== Sixth qualifier ===
First round
(New Zealand) Ruth Seeman	1	4
(United States) Jill Smoller	6	6
(Japan) Miki Mizokuchi	3	7^{7}	6
(United States) Sylvia Schenck	6	6^{2}	3

Second round
15	(Sweden) Maria Ekstrand	2	3
(United States) Jill Smoller	6	6
(Japan) Miki Mizokuchi	6	6
4	(West Germany) Silke Frankl	4	3

Qualifying competition
(United States) Jill Smoller	3	6	6
(Japan) Miki Mizokuchi	6	3	3

=== Seventh qualifier ===
First round
(United States) Erika deLone	6	6
(United Kingdom) Anne Simpkin	1	3
(France) Sandrine Testud	6	6
WC	(Australia) Kerry-Anne Guse	0	2

Second round
8	(Australia) Lisa O'Neill	4	4
(United States) Erika deLone	6	6
(France) Sandrine Testud	5	3
14	(Japan) Masako Yanagi	7	6

Qualifying competition
(United States) Erika deLone	6	6
14	(Japan) Masako Yanagi	1	2

=== Eighth qualifier ===
First round
WC	(Australia) Catherine Barclay	6	6
WC	(Australia) Danielle Jones	3	3
(Israel) Yael Segal	6^{6}	6^{3}
(Japan) Emiko Okagawa	7^{8}	7^{7}

Second round
10	(United Kingdom) Amanda Grunfeld	6	6
WC	(Australia) Catherine Barclay	2	4
(Japan) Emiko Okagawa	3	4
2	(United Kingdom) Clare Wood	6	6

Qualifying competition
10	(United Kingdom) Amanda Grunfeld	1	6^{5}
2	(United Kingdom) Clare Wood	6	7^{7}
