= Shelly Bartlett =

American tennis player

- Country (sports): United States
- Born: April 21, 1965 (age 59)

Singles
- Highest ranking: No. 542 (Feb 18, 1991)

Doubles
- Career titles: 1 ITF
- Highest ranking: No. 176 (Jan 14, 1991)

Grand Slam doubles results
- Wimbledon: Q1 (1990)

Grand Slam mixed doubles results
- Wimbledon: Q1 (1990)

Shelly Bartlett (born April 21, 1965), now Shelly Sweeney, is an American former professional tennis player.

Bartlett, a California native, played collegiate tennis for the University of Colorado and UC Berkeley during the 1990s.

On the professional tour, Bartlett had a best singles ranking of 542 and qualified for her only WTA Tour singles main draw at the 1990 Singapore Open. She was ranked as high as 176 in the world for doubles.

Her elder sister, Lindsay Bartlett, also played on the professional tour.

== ITF finals ==
=== Doubles: 1 (1–0) ===
Outcome	No.	Date	Tournament	Surface	Partner	Opponents	Score
Winner	1.	Jan 1990	ITF Waco, United States	Hard	(United States) Lindsay Bartlett	(United States) Tory Plunkett (Canada) Rene Simpson	6–4, 6–3
