= Arkie Engle =

American tennis player

- Full name: Arthur Knapp Engle
- Country (sports): United States
- Born: 19 December 1965 (age 60) Boston, U.S.
- Plays: Left-handed

Singles
- Highest ranking: No. 287 (Dec 4, 1989)

Grand Slam singles results
- Wimbledon: Q1 (1989, 1990)

Doubles
- Career record: 1–1
- Highest ranking: No. 283 (Oct 16, 1989)

Grand Slam doubles results
- Wimbledon: Q2 (1990)

Arthur Knapp Engle (born December 19, 1965) is an American former professional tennis player.

A left-handed player from Boston, Engle attended Harvard University and competed in varsity tennis. He earned ITA All-American honors for doubles in 1985 and was named the Region I Senior Player of the Year in 1988.

Engle, now an attorney, featured briefly on the professional tour after Harvard and had a best singles ranking of 287. He was a semi-finalist at the 1989 Bossonnens Challenger and made two qualifying draw appearances at Wimbledon. In his only Grand Prix main draw he reached the doubles second round of the 1989 U.S. Pro Tennis Championships.

== ATP Challenger finals ==
=== Doubles: 1 (0–1) ===
Result	Date	Tournament	Surface	Partner	Opponents	Score
Loss	Aug 1989	Winnetka, United States	Hard	(United States) Bill Benjes	(Sweden) Ville Jansson (United States) Scott Warner	7–6, 4–6, 4–6
