= 1989 South African Open (tennis) =

- Date: 13–19 November
- Edition: 86th
- Category: Grand Prix
- Draw: 32S / 16D
- Prize money: $297,500
- Surface: Hard / indoor
- Location: Johannesburg, South Africa

Champions

Singles
- (South Africa) Christo van Rensburg

Doubles
- (United States) Luke Jensen / (United States) Richey Reneberg
← 1988 ·	South African Open	· 1992 →

The 1989 South African Open was a men's tennis tournament played on indoor hard courts in Johannesburg in South Africa that was part of the 1989 Nabisco Grand Prix. It was the 86th edition of the tournament and was held from 13 through 19 November 1989. Third-seeded Christo van Rensburg won the singles title.

== Finals ==
=== Singles ===
(South Africa) Christo van Rensburg defeated (United States) Paul Chamberlin 6–4, 7–6, 6–3

- It was van Rensburg's 3rd title of the year and the 14th of his career.

=== Doubles ===
(United States) Luke Jensen / (United States) Richey Reneberg defeated (United States) Kelly Jones / (United States) Joey Rive 6–0, 6–4

- It was Jensen's only title of the year and the 2nd of his career. It was Reneberg's only title of the year and the 1st of his career.
