= Ville Jansson =

Swedish tennis player

- Full name: Ville Jansson
- Country (sports): Sweden
- Born: 10 April 1965 (age 59); Timrå, Sweden
- Height: 183 cm (6 ft 0 in)
- Prize money: $36,255

Singles
- Career record: 0-2
- Career titles: 0
- Highest ranking: No. 243 (9 July 1990)

Grand Slam singles results
- Australian Open: Q1 (1990)
- Wimbledon: Q2 (1990)

Doubles
- Career record: 4-9
- Career titles: 0
- Highest ranking: No. 143 (30 April 1990)

Grand Slam doubles results
- Australian Open: 1R (1990)
- French Open: 1R (1990)
- US Open: 1R (1990)

Grand Slam mixed doubles results
- French Open: 1R (1990)

Ville Jansson (born 10 April 1965) is a former professional tennis player from Sweden.

== Biography ==
Born in Timrå, Jansson grew up in the town of Värnamo.

Prior to touring professionally he played collegiate tennis for Northeast Louisiana University. He earned All-American honours in 1986 and graduated in 1988.

From 1989 he joined the professional circuit, where he competed for two years. He beat Chris Pridham to win a Challenger tournament in Coquitlam in 1989, in addition to three Challenger titles he won in doubles. In 1990 he appeared in the main draw of the men's doubles at the Australian Open, French Open and US Open.

Since retiring he has lived mostly in Texas. In 2017 he became the Director of Sports at Lost Creek Country Club in Austin, Texas.

== Challenger titles ==
=== Singles: (1) ===
No.	Year	Tournament	Surface	Opponent	Score
1.	1989	Coquitlam, Canada	Hard	(Canada) Chris Pridham	6–4, 6–2

=== Doubles: (3) ===
No.	Year	Tournament	Surface	Partner	Opponents	Score
1.	1989	Croydon, Great Britain	Carpet	(Australia) Russell Barlow	(United States) Mike De Palmer (South Africa) Byron Talbot	2–6, 6–3, 7–5
2.	1989	Winnetka, United States	Hard	(United States) Scott Warner	(United States) Bill Benjes (United States) Arkie Engle	6–7, 6–4, 6–4
3.	1990	Mexico City, Mexico	Clay	(Argentina) Pablo Albano	(Nigeria) Nduka Odizor (United States) Bryan Shelton	7–6, 4–6, 7–5
