= Dean Botha =

South African tennis player

- Country (sports): South Africa
- Born: 30 March 1964 (age 60); East London, South Africa
- Height: 5 ft 9 in (175 cm)
- Plays: Right-handed
- Prize money: $21,995

Singles
- Career record: 1–1
- Highest ranking: No. 186 (18 December 1989)

Grand Slam singles results
- Wimbledon: Q2 (1990)

Doubles
- Highest ranking: No. 230 (26 May 1986)

Grand Slam doubles results
- Wimbledon: Q1 (1990)

Dean Botha (born 30 March 1964) is a South African former professional tennis player.

== Biography ==
Born in East London, Botha was a right-handed player who reached a best singles ranking of 186 while competing on the professional tour and was based in Cape Town.

Botha was a quarter-finalist at the 1989 South African Open, where he played as a qualifier. He had a first round win over John Fitzgerald, then earned a quarter-final place when second seed Kevin Curren had to withdraw from their second round match with a knee injury.

In 1990 he participated in the singles and doubles qualifying draws for the Wimbledon Championships.

Dean is married to Debbe and has three children. His daughter, Courtney, studied law at the University of Cape Town. His sons, Jarryd and Trent, both played college tennis in the United States, for Alabama and Arizona respectively.
