= Ulrike Priller =

Austrian tennis player

- Full name: Ulrike Priller-Dressler
- Country (sports): Austria
- Born: 6 January 1973 (age 52)
- Prize money: $29,512

Singles
- Career titles: 4 ITF
- Highest ranking: No. 182 (9 July 1990)

Grand Slam singles results
- Australian Open: Q3 (1990)

Doubles
- Highest ranking: No. 423 (15 July 1991)

Ulrike Priller-Dressler (born 6 January 1973) is an Austrian former professional tennis player.

Priller reached a career best ranking of 182 in the world and won four ITF titles.

Her best performance on the WTA Tour was a second round appearance at Brisbane in 1990, which she followed up by making it through to the final qualifying round for the Australian Open.

== ITF finals ==
$50,000 tournaments
$25,000 tournaments
$10,000 tournaments

=== Singles: 6 (4–2) ===
Result	No.	Date	Tournament	Surface	Opponent	Score
Win	1.	19 June 1989	Velden, Austria	Clay	(Austria) Birgit Arming	7–5, 6–1
Loss	1.	11 September 1989	Pamplona, Spain	Clay	(Brazil) Cláudia Chabalgoity	3–6, 3–6
Win	2.	11 November 1991	Rio de Janeiro, Brazil	Clay	(Argentina) Maria Jose Gaidano	6–3, 6–4
Loss	2.	13 November 1995	Cairo, Egypt	Clay	(Israel) Hila Rosen	3–6, 2–6
Win	3.	5 February 1996	Mallorca, Spain	Clay	(Spain) Rosa María Andrés Rodríguez	3–6, 6–4, 6–3
Win	4.	1 April 1996	Athens, Greece	Clay	(Russia) Ekaterina Sysoeva	2–6, 6–3, 6–2
