= Karen Shin =

American tennis player

- Country (sports): United States
- Born: July 5, 1968 (age 56)
- Prize money: $25,370

Singles
- Career record: 52–38
- Career titles: 2 ITF
- Highest ranking: No. 176 (September 25, 1989)

Grand Slam singles results
- Australian Open: Q2 (1990)
- French Open: Q1 (1990)
- Wimbledon: Q1 (1990)

Karen Shin (born 5 July 1968) is an American former professional tennis player.

Shin won the CIF Southern Section singles championship as a Chaminade College senior in 1985, then played college tennis at UC Berkeley, where she was a four-time All-American.

Following her time at UC Berkeley, Shin competed briefly on the international circuit and reached a career high singles ranking of 176 in the world. Her best performance on the WTA Tour was a second round appearance at the Virginia Slims of Arizona in 1989.

== ITF finals ==
=== Singles: 2 (2–0) ===
Outcome	No.	Date	Tournament	Surface	Opponent	Score
Winner	1.	June 11, 1989	Delray Beach, United States	Hard	(United States) Tammy Whittington	6–3, 6–7^{(6)}, 6–3
Winner	2.	June 18, 1989	Niceville, United States	Clay	(United States) Linda Wild	6–3, 6–4
