= 1992 South African Open (tennis) =

- Date: 30 March – 5 April
- Edition: 87th
- Category: ATP World Series
- Draw: 32S / 16D
- Prize money: $270,000
- Surface: Hard / outdoor
- Location: Johannesburg, South Africa

Champions

Singles
- (United States) Aaron Krickstein

Doubles
- (South Africa) Pieter Aldrich / (South Africa) Danie Visser
- South African Open

The 1992 South African Open, also known by its sponsored name Panasonic South African Open, was a men's tennis tournament played on hard courts. It was the 87th edition of the South African Open and was part of the ATP World Series of the 1992 ATP Tour. It took place in Johannesburg, South Africa from 30 March through 5 April 1992.

It was the first time that the tournament had been held since 1989. Aaron Krickstein won the singles title and in an all-South African doubles final, Pieter Aldrich and Danie Visser overcame Wayne Ferreira and Pieter Norval.

== Finals ==
=== Singles ===
(United States) Aaron Krickstein defeated (Commonwealth of Independent States) Alexander Volkov, 6–4, 6–4

- It was Krickstein's only singles title of the year and the 8th of his career.

=== Doubles ===
(South Africa) Pieter Aldrich / (South Africa) Danie Visser defeated (South Africa) Wayne Ferreira / (South Africa) Piet Norval, 6–4, 6–4
