= Craig Johnson (tennis) =

American tennis player

- Country (sports): United States
- Born: Boonton, New Jersey, U.S.
- Height: 5 ft 8 in (173 cm)

Singles
- Highest ranking: No. 318 (Aug 13, 1990)

Grand Slam singles results
- Australian Open: Q3 (1991)
- Wimbledon: Q1 (1990)

Doubles
- Career record: 0–1
- Highest ranking: No. 281 (Jul 23, 1990)

Grand Slam doubles results
- Wimbledon: Q2 (1990)

Craig Johnson is an American former professional tennis player.

Johnson, who played collegiate tennis at Pepperdine University for four years, reached a best singles world ranking of 318 on the professional tour. His only ATP Tour main draw appearance came in doubles at the 1990 OTB International Open in Schenectady. He featured in singles qualifying at Wimbledon during his career and won two qualifying matches at the 1991 Australian Open, including against future finalist Thomas Enqvist.

== ATP Challenger finals ==
=== Doubles: 1 (0–1) ===
Result	Date	Tournament	Surface	Partner	Opponents	Score
Loss	Oct 1989	Beijing, China	Hard	(United States) Brian Devening	(India) Zeeshan Ali (New Zealand) Bruce Derlin	4–6, 4–6
