= Johan Kjellsten =

Swedish tennis player

- Country (sports): Sweden
- Born: 3 September 1965 (age 59)

Singles
- Highest ranking: No. 318 (6 Aug 1990)

Grand Slam singles results
- Wimbledon: Q1 (1990)

Doubles
- Career record: 0–1
- Highest ranking: No. 431 (6 Aug 1990)

Johan Kjellsten (born 3 September 1965) is a Swedish former professional tennis player.

Kjellsten played collegiate tennis in the United States, first at McNeese State University, before transferring to Louisiana State University for his senior year, where he earned All-American honors.

On the professional tour, Kjellsten had a best singles world ranking of 318. He was a quarter-finalist at the 1989 Eger Challenger and featured in qualifying at Wimbledon in 1990. His only ATP Tour main draw appearance came in doubles at the 1990 Bordeaux Open, partnering Johan Donar.
