= 1989 ABN World Tennis Tournament =

- Date: 6–12 February
- Edition: 17th
- Category: Grand Prix (Super Series)
- Draw: 32S / 16D
- Prize money: $325,000
- Surface: Carpet / indoor
- Location: Rotterdam, Netherlands
- Venue: Rotterdam Ahoy

Champions

Singles
- (Switzerland) Jakob Hlasek

Doubles
- (Czechoslovakia) Miloslav Mečíř / (Czechoslovakia) Milan Šrejber
- ABN World Tennis Tournament

The 1989 ABN World Tennis Tournament was a men's tennis tournament played on indoor carpet courts at Rotterdam Ahoy in the Netherlands. It was part of the Super Series of the 1989 Nabisco Grand Prix. It was the 17th edition of the tournament and was held from 6 February through 12 February 1989. Second-seeded Jakob Hlasek won the singles title.

== Finals ==
=== Singles ===
(Switzerland) Jakob Hlasek defeated (Sweden) Anders Järryd 6–1, 7–5

- It was Hlasek's 1st title of the year and the 7th of his career.

=== Doubles ===
(Czechoslovakia) Miloslav Mečíř / (Czechoslovakia) Milan Šrejber defeated (Sweden) Jan Gunnarsson / (Sweden) Magnus Gustafsson 7–6, 6–0

- It was Mečíř's 1st title of the year and the 19th of his career. It was Šrejber's only title of the year and the 3rd of his career.
