= 1993 ABN AMRO World Tennis Tournament =

- Date: 22–28 February
- Edition: 21st
- Category: ATP World Series
- Draw: 32S / 16D
- Prize money: $575,000
- Surface: Carpet / indoor
- Location: Rotterdam, Netherlands
- Venue: Rotterdam Ahoy

Champions

Singles
- (Sweden) Anders Järryd

Doubles
- (Sweden) Henrik Holm / (Sweden) Anders Järryd
- ABN AMRO World Tennis Tournament

The 1993 ABN AMRO World Tennis Tournament was a men's tennis tournament played on indoor carpet courts. It was the 21st edition of the event known that year as the ABN AMRO World Tennis Tournament, and was part of the ATP World Series of the 1993 ATP Tour. It took place at the Rotterdam Ahoy indoor sporting arena in Rotterdam, Netherlands, from 22 February through 28 February 1993. Unseeded Anders Järryd won the singles title.

The singles draw was headlined by ATP No. 7, Wimbledon runner-up, Sydney, Stockholm and recent Doha champion Goran Ivanišević. Other seeded players competing were Los Angeles and Antwerp titlist, Stuttgart Indoor finalist Richard Krajicek, Auckland winner Alexander Volkov, Henrik Holm, Karel Nováček and Wayne Ferreira.

== Finals ==
=== Singles ===
(Sweden) Anders Järryd defeated (Czech Republic) Karel Nováček 6–3, 7–5

- It was Anders Järryd's 1st title of the year, and his 8th overall.

=== Doubles ===
(Sweden) Henrik Holm / (Sweden) Anders Järryd defeated (South Africa) David Adams / (Russia) Andrei Olhovskiy 6–4, 7–6
