= Xavier Daufresne =

Belgian tennis player

- Country (sports): Belgium
- Born: 24 December 1968 (age 56); Lasne, Belgium
- Height: 6 ft 4 in (193 cm)
- Plays: Right-handed
- Prize money: $252,896

Singles
- Career record: 13–29
- Career titles: 0
- Highest ranking: No. 109 (21 March 1994)

Grand Slam singles results
- Australian Open: 4R (1994)
- French Open: 2R (1994)

Doubles
- Career record: 7–13
- Career titles: 0
- Highest ranking: No. 150 (30 November 1992)

Xavier Daufresne (born 24 December 1968) is a former tennis player from Belgium.

Daufresne turned professional in 1988. He did not win any Grand Prix tennis or ATP Tour titles (in either singles or doubles) during his career. The right-hander reached his highest individual ranking on the ATP Tour on 21 March 1994, when he was ranked World No. 109.

At the 1994 Australian Open Daufresne defeated three future grand slam finalists, Thomas Johansson, Thomas Enquist and Patrick Rafter, en route to the final 16.
