= Ralph Kok =

Dutch tennis player

- Country (sports): Netherlands
- Born: 18 October 1967 (age 57)
- Plays: Right-handed
- Prize money: $36,729

Singles
- Career record: 1–4
- Career titles: 0
- Highest ranking: No. 243 (10 July 1989)

Grand Slam singles results
- Wimbledon: 1R (1990)

Doubles
- Career record: 1–3
- Career titles: 0
- Highest ranking: No. 306 (20 March 1989)

Ralph Kok (born 18 October 1967) is a former professional tennis player from the Netherlands.

== Career ==
Kok and partner Christian Bergström made the doubles quarter-finals of the 1989 ABN World Tennis Tournament in Rotterdam. He reached the second round of the singles at the same tournament in 1993, having a win over world number 68 Patrik Kühnen.

The Dutchman was beaten by Dan Goldie in the opening round of the 1990 Wimbledon Championships.

He now coaches Arantxa Rus and Anastasiya Yakimova.
