= Paul Hand =

British tennis player and sports broadcaster

- Full name: Paul Hand
- Country (sports): Great Britain
- Born: 3 July 1965 (age 59); Berkshire, England
- Prize money: $68,830

Singles
- Highest ranking: No. 371 (23 October 1995)

Doubles
- Career record: 5-8
- Highest ranking: No. 171 (21 March 1994)

Grand Slam doubles results
- Wimbledon: QF (1993)

Grand Slam mixed doubles results
- Wimbledon: 2R (1994, 1995)

Paul Hand (born 3 July 1965) is a British sports broadcaster and former professional tennis player. He was born in Berkshire, England.

== Tennis career ==
Hand played on the professional tour primarily as a doubles specialist, with a best ranking of 171 in the world. As a singles player he was joint winner of the Scottish Championships in 1992.

Hand regularly featured as a doubles player at the Wimbledon Championships in the 1990s. Most notably he made the quarter-finals of the men's doubles at the 1993 Wimbledon Championships as a wildcard pairing with Chris Wilkinson. They had a win en route over the ninth seeded Jensen brothers, Luke and Murphy, then in the quarter-finals were beaten in five sets, by Rikard Bergh and Byron Talbot. In addition to his six main draw appearances in men's doubles at Wimbledon he played in the mixed doubles four times, all with Valda Lake. He also played in mixed doubles qualifying with his younger sister Kaye Hand.

== Post tennis ==
Hand works as a tennis coach and a sports broadcaster for BBC Sport and Eurosport.
