= Kaye Hand =

British tennis player

- Full name: Kaye Marfani-Hand
- Country (sports): United Kingdom
- Born: 4 October 1968 (age 56); Berkshire, England
- Prize money: $39,806

Singles
- Highest ranking: No. 201 (8 July 1991)

Grand Slam singles results
- Wimbledon: 1R (1991)

Doubles
- Highest ranking: No. 167 (30 January 1989)

Grand Slam doubles results
- Wimbledon: 1R (1991)

Kaye Marfani-Hand (born 4 October 1968) is a British former professional tennis player.

== Biography ==
Born in Berkshire, she is the younger sister of sports broadcaster and former player Paul Hand.

Hand reached a highest singles ranking of 201, with her best performance coming at the 1990 Brighton International, where she defeated world number 46 Brenda Schultz in the first round.

At the 1991 Wimbledon Championships, Hand received a wildcard to compete in both the women's singles and doubles draws. In the doubles she and partner Julie Salmon lost in the first round to high profile opponents, Martina Navratilova and Pam Shriver.
