= 1988 South African Open (tennis) =

Men's tennis tournament

- Date: 14–20 November
- Edition: 85th
- Category: Grand Prix
- Draw: 32S / 16D
- Prize money: $297,500
- Surface: Hard / outdoor
- Location: Johannesburg, South Africa

Champions

Singles
- (Switzerland) Jakob Hlasek

Doubles
- (United States) Kevin Curren / (United States) David Pate
- South African Open

The 1988 South African Open was a men's tennis tournament played on outdoor hard courts in Johannesburg, South Africa as part of the 1988 Nabisco Grand Prix. It was the 85th edition of the tournament and was held from 14 November through 20 November 1988. Second-seeded Jakob Hlasek won the singles title.

== Finals ==
=== Singles ===
(Switzerland) Jakob Hlasek defeated (South Africa) Christo van Rensburg 6–7, 6–4, 6–1, 7–6

- It was Hlasek's 2nd singles title of the year and of his career.

=== Doubles ===
(United States) Kevin Curren / (United States) David Pate defeated (South Africa) Gary Muller / (United States) Tim Wilkison 7–6, 6–4
