= Michelle Bowrey =

Australian tennis player

- Country (sports): Australia
- Born: 12 July 1970 (age 54)
- Plays: Right-handed
- Prize money: $30,289

Singles
- Career record: 51–62
- Highest ranking: No. 233 (30 January 1989)

Grand Slam singles results
- Australian Open: 1R (1987, 1988, 1989)

Doubles
- Career record: 36–47
- Highest ranking: No. 159 (16 April 1990)

Grand Slam doubles results
- Australian Open: 2R (1990)

Michelle Bowrey (born 12 July 1970) is a retired professional female tennis player from Australia who competed on the WTA Tour. She competed in the Australian Open three times and attained a career-high ranking of #233 in January 1989.

Bowrey is the daughter of two-time French Open champion Lesley Turner Bowrey and 1968 Australian Open winner Bill Bowrey.

== ITF Circuit finals ==
=== Singles (0–3) ===
$25,000 tournaments
$10,000 tournaments

Result	No.	Date	Tournament	Surface	Opponent	Score
Loss	1.	13 April 1986	Adelaide, Australia	Grass	(New Zealand) Michelle Parun	3–6, 7–6, 2–6
Loss	2.	31 October 1986	Sydney, Australia	Hard	(Australia) Nicole Bradtke	3–6, 3–6
Loss	3.	28 November 1988	Southern Cross, Australia	Hard	(Australia) Rachel McQuillan	6–7, 6–7

=== Doubles (1–2) ===
Result	No.	Date	Tournament	Surface	Partner	Opponents	Score
Loss	1.	22 June 1987	Francavilla, Italy	Clay	(Australia) Kristine Kunce	(Australia) Kate McDonald (West Germany) Martina Pawlik	4–6, 3–6
Win	2.	29 June 1987	Brindisi, Italy	Clay	(Australia) Kristine Kunce	(Spain) Rosa Bielsa (Spain) Elena Guerra	6–3, 7–6
Loss	3.	21 November 1988	Gold Coast, Australia	Hard	(Australia) Clare Thompson	(Australia) Jo-Anne Faull (Australia) Rachel McQuillan	2–6, 4–6
