= Chris Pridham =

Canadian tennis player

- Country (sports): Canada
- Residence: Oakville, Ontario, Canada
- Born: April 11, 1965 (age 59); Toronto, Ontario, Canada
- Height: 6 ft 0 in (1.83 m)
- Turned pro: 1985
- Plays: Right-handed (two-handed backhand)
- Prize money: $431,272

Singles
- Career record: 54–78
- Career titles: 0; 2 Challenger, 0 Futures
- Highest ranking: No. 75 (14 March 1988)

Grand Slam singles results
- Australian Open: 3R (1989)
- French Open: 2R (1992)
- Wimbledon: 3R (1988)
- US Open: 2R (1992)

Other tournaments
- Olympic Games: 1R (1988)

Doubles
- Career record: 2–8
- Career titles: 0; 1 Challenger, 0 Futures
- Highest ranking: No. 234 (25 November 1991)

Grand Slam doubles results
- Wimbledon: Q3 (1991, 1992)
- Last updated on: 16 December 2021.

Chris Pridham (born April 11, 1965) is a former touring professional tennis player.

Pridham had a career Grand Prix / ATP tour win–loss record of 54 and 78. His career high singles ranking was World No. 75, which he attained in March 1988. The 6'0 right-hander's best tournament results were a semi-finals appearance in the 1987 Wellington Classic, and 1992 Johannesburg Grand Prix events. His best Grand Slam event showings was reaching the third rounds of the 1988 Wimbledon Championships and the 1989 Australian Open.

== 1985 ==
Pridham played his first professional match in March 1985 at the Montreal Challenger, going down in 3 sets to World No. 60 Leif Shiras 3–6, 6–3, 3–6. He played one other tour event that year, the Player's International, also in Montreal, where he also fell in the first round, this time to World No. 130 Jonathan Canter 0–6, 6–7.

== 1986 ==
Pridham played in 8 challenger tennis events and one grand prix event for the 1986, going 4 wins, 8 losses at the challenger level and 0 and 1 in grand prix events. He won his first match of his touring year over World No. 151 Huub Van Boeckel 7–5, 7–6 before losing in the next round, at the Benin City-1 Challenger in February. The following week at the Enugu Challenger he lost in the first round. The following month Pridham fell in the first round at the Rio de Janeiro-1 Challenger and two weeks later he had the same result at the San Luis Potosi Challenger.

Pridham resumed tour play in September, defeating World No. 127 Jon Levine in the first round at the West Palm, FL Challenger before falling to World No. 246 Marc Flur in straight sets. The following week in Athens, Greece he lost World No. 241 Brian Levine in the first round in three sets. Then in November he played in only grand prix event of the year, the Stockholm Open, losing there in the first round as well, to World No. 167 Shahar Perkiss three and three. Pridham then went 1 and 1 the following week at the Helsinki Challenger and again the next week at the Benin-2 Challenger. He finished the year World No. 263 in singles and No. 408 in doubles.

Most notable win defeating Bjorn Borg in 1992. (to come)

== Davis Cup ==
As a Davis Cup player for Canada between 1988 and 1990, Pridham had a career singles win-lose record of 4 and 5.

== ATP Challenger and ITF Futures finals ==
=== Singles: 5 (2–3) ===
Legend ATP Challenger (2–3) ITF Futures (0–0)	Finals by surface Hard (2–3) Clay (0–0) Grass (0–0) Carpet (0–0)

Result	W–L	Date	Tournament	Tier	Surface	Opponent	Score
Win	1–0	Apr 1989	Setúbal, Portugal	Challenger	Hard	(Sweden) Rikard Bergh	6–4, 6–1
Loss	1–1	Oct 1989	Coquitlam, Canada	Challenger	Hard	(Sweden) Ville Jansson	4–6, 2–6
Loss	1–2	Sep 1990	Azores, Portugal	Challenger	Hard	(Spain) Francisco Roig	3–6, 6–2, 4–6
Loss	1–3	Oct 1990	Ponte Vedra, United States	Challenger	Hard	(United States) Tommy Ho	6–7, 4–6
Win	2–3	Sep 1991	Bloomfield Hills, United States	Challenger	Hard	(United States) Tommy Ho	6–3, 6–4

=== Doubles: 1 (1–0) ===
Legend ATP Challenger (1–0) ITF Futures (0–0)	Finals by surface Hard (0–0) Clay (0–0) Grass (0–0) Carpet (1–0)

Result	W–L	Date	Tournament	Tier	Surface	Partner	Opponents	Score
Win	1–0	Nov 1991	Munich, Germany	Challenger	Carpet	(Netherlands) Tom Kempers	(Germany) Rudiger Haas (Germany) Arne Thoms	7–6, 6–4

== Performance timeline ==
Key
W	F	SF	QF	#R	RR	Q#	DNQ	A	NH

(W) winner; (F) finalist; (SF) semifinalist; (QF) quarterfinalist; (#R) rounds 4, 3, 2, 1; (RR) round-robin stage; (Q#) qualification round; (DNQ) did not qualify; (A) absent; (NH) not held; (SR) strike rate (events won / competed); (W–L) win–loss record.

=== Singles ===
Tournament	1985	1986	1987	1988	1989	1990	1991	1992	1993	SR	W–L	Win %
Grand Slam tournaments
Australian Open	Q1	A	Q3	2R	3R	1R	A	Q1	2R	0 / 4	4–4	50%
French Open	A	A	A	1R	A	A	A	2R	A	0 / 2	1–2	33%
Wimbledon	A	A	A	3R	1R	Q1	A	1R	Q2	0 / 3	2–3	40%
US Open	A	A	A	1R	A	A	A	2R	Q1	0 / 2	1–2	33%
Win–loss	0–0	0–0	0–0	3–4	2–2	0–1	0–0	2–3	1–1	0 / 11	8–11	42%
Olympic Games
Summer Olympics	Not Held			1R	Not Held			A	NH	0 / 1	0–1	0%
ATP Masters Series
Miami	A	A	A	2R	A	A	A	A	A	0 / 1	1–1	50%
Canada	1R	A	2R	A	1R	1R	2R	3R	2R	0 / 7	5–7	42%
Cincinnati	A	A	A	A	A	A	A	A	Q3	0 / 0	0–0	–
Win–loss	0–1	0–0	1–1	1–1	0–1	0–1	1–1	2–1	1–1	0 / 8	6–8	43%
