= 1990 Prudential-Bache Securities Classic – Singles =

Singles
- 1990 Prudential-Bache Securities Classic
- 1989 Champion: (United States) Andre Agassi

Final
- Champion: (United States) Brad Gilbert
- Runner-up: (South Africa) Christo van Rensburg
- Score: 6–2, 6–1

Details
- Draw: 32
- Seeds: 8

Events
Singles	Doubles
← 1989 ·	Prudential-Bache Securities Classic	· 1991 →

Andre Agassi was the defending champion, but did not participate that year.
Brad Gilbert won the title, defeating Christo van Rensburg 6–2, 6–1, in the final.

== Seeds ==
1. (United States) Brad Gilbert (champion)
2. (United States) Aaron Krickstein (second round, withdrew)
3. (South Africa) Christo van Rensburg (final)
4. (United States) Scott Davis (quarterfinals)
5. (United States) Glenn Layendecker (second round)
6. (United States) Jimmy Arias (first round)
7. (Finland) Veli Paloheimo (first round, retired)
8. (India) Ramesh Krishnan (second round)

== Draw ==
=== Key ===
- Q = Qualifier
- WC = Wild card
- LL = Lucky loser
- Alt = Alternate
- SE = Special exempt
- PR = Protected ranking
- ITF = ITF entry
- JE = Junior exempt
- w/o = Walkover
- r = Retired
- d = Defaulted
- SR = Special ranking

=== Finals ===
Semifinals
1	(United States) Brad Gilbert	6	7
Q	(United States) MaliVai Washington	2	5
3	(South Africa) Christo van Rensburg	6^{2}	6	7
(United States) David Pate	7^{7}	3	5

Final
1	(United States) Brad Gilbert	6	6
3	(South Africa) Christo van Rensburg	2	1

=== Top half ===
First round
1	(United States) B Gilbert	6	6
(West Germany) C Saceanu	4	4
(Sweden) L-A Wahlgren	5	1
(United States) J Brown	7	6
(United States) J Rive	6	6
(United States) J Tarango	4	4
(Puerto Rico) M Nido	6
7	(Finland) V Paloheimo	4	r
4	(United States) S Davis	4	7^{7}	6
(Sweden) T Högstedt	6	6^{5}	4
(United States) D Goldie	6	6
(United States) L Shiras	3	1
Q	(United States) M Washington	6	6
(United States) K Jones	3	2
WC	(United States) J Ross	7^{7}	1	6
6	(United States) J Arias	6^{5}	6	3

Second round
1	(United States) B Gilbert	6	6
(United States) J Brown	2	1
(United States) J Rive	3	7	6
(Puerto Rico) M Nido	6	5	4
4	(United States) S Davis	1	6	6
(United States) D Goldie	6	4	2
Q	(United States) M Washington	6	7
WC	(United States) J Ross	1	5

Quarterfinals
1	(United States) B Gilbert	6	6
(United States) J Rive	3	3
4	(United States) S Davis	3	5
Q	(United States) M Washington	6	7

Semifinals
1	(United States) B Gilbert	6	7
Q	(United States) M Washington	2	5

=== Bottom half ===
First round
5	(United States) G Layendecker	6	6
WC	(United States) J Palmer	3	1
Q	(South Africa) R Deppe	1	5
(Australia) J Stoltenberg	6	7
(Venezuela) N Pereira	7^{7}	6^{5}	7^{7}
Q	(United States) R Weiss	6^{2}	7^{7}	6^{3}
(Socialist Federal Republic of Yugoslavia) S Živojinović	6^{2}	6	3
3	(South Africa) C van Rensburg	7^{7}	3	6
8	(India) R Krishnan	6^{2}	6	7
(United States) D Rostagno	7^{7}	2	5
(United States) D Pate	6	6
(West Germany) A Mronz	4	4
WC	(United States) A Hombrecher	7	6
Q	(Sweden) D Engel	5	3
(West Germany) M Zoecke	1	2
2	(United States) A Krickstein	6	6

Second round
5	(United States) G Layendecker	4	7^{12}	4
(Australia) J Stoltenberg	6	6^{10}	6
(Venezuela) N Pereira	3	6^{4}
3	(South Africa) C van Rensburg	6	7^{7}
8	(India) R Krishnan	2	6	3
(United States) D Pate	6	3	6
WC	(United States) A Hombrecher	w/o
2	(United States) A Krickstein

Quarterfinals
(Australia) J Stoltenberg	4	6	1
3	(South Africa) C van Rensburg	6	4	6
(United States) D Pate	6	7^{7}
WC	(United States) A Hombrecher	4	6^{5}

Semifinals
3	(South Africa) C van Rensburg	6^{2}	6	7
(United States) D Pate	7^{7}	3	5
