= 1991 Prudential-Bache Securities Classic – Doubles =

Doubles
- 1991 Prudential-Bache Securities Classic

Final
- Champions: (United States) Luke Jensen (United States) Scott Melville
- Runners-up: (Venezuela) Nicolás Pereira (United States) Pete Sampras
- Score: 6–7^{(5–7)}, 7–6^{(8–6)}, 6–3

Details
- Draw: 16
- Seeds: 4

Events
Singles	Doubles
← 1990 ·	Verizon Tennis Challenge	· 1992 →

Scott Davis and David Pate were the defending champions, but lost in the first round to Nicolás Pereira and Pete Sampras.

Luke Jensen and Scott Melville won the title by defeating Pereira and Sampras 6–7^{(5–7)}, 7–6^{(8–6)}, 6–3 in the final.

== Seeds ==
1. (United States) Scott Davis / (United States) David Pate (first round)
2. (United States) Brian Garrow / (United States) Brad Pearce (semifinals)
3. (United States) Ken Flach / (United States) Robert Seguso (quarterfinals)
4. (United States) Steve DeVries / (Australia) David Macpherson (semifinals)

== Draw ==
=== Key ===
- Q = Qualifier
- WC = Wild card
- LL = Lucky loser
- Alt = Alternate
- SE = Special exempt
- PR = Protected ranking
- ITF = ITF entry
- JE = Junior exempt
- w/o = Walkover
- r = Retired
- d = Defaulted
- SR = Special ranking

=== Draw ===
First round
1	(United States) S Davis (United States) D Pate	4	6	6
WC	(Venezuela) N Pereira (United States) P Sampras	6	4	7
Q	(United States) A Hombrecher (United States) MV Washington	3	4
(Romania) M Năstase (Australia) L Warder	6	6
4	(United States) S DeVries (Australia) D Macpherson	7	6
(New Zealand) B Derlin (Sweden) D Engel	6	4
(Brazil) M Menezes (Venezuela) A Mora	6	1
(The Bahamas) R Smith (Sweden) T Svantesson	7	6
(United States) L Jensen (United States) S Melville	6	7
(Brazil) N Aerts (Brazil) D Marcelino	3	6
(Canada) G Connell (United States) J Rive	6	1
3	(United States) K Flach (United States) R Seguso	7	6
(United States) B Shelton (United States) K Thorne	4	7	7
(United States) B Garnett (United States) G Van Emburgh	6	6	6
(United States) J Brown (United States) D Rostagno	6	7	3
2	(United States) B Garrow (United States) B Pearce	7	6	6

Quarterfinals
WC	(Venezuela) N Pereira (United States) P Sampras	6	5	6
(Romania) M Năstase (Australia) L Warder	4	7	1
4	(United States) S DeVries (Australia) D Macpherson	7	6
(The Bahamas) R Smith (Sweden) T Svantesson	6	4
(United States) L Jensen (United States) S Melville	3	7	6
3	(United States) K Flach (United States) R Seguso	6	6	4
(United States) B Shelton (United States) K Thorne	5	4
2	(United States) B Garrow (United States) B Pearce	7	6

Semifinals
WC	(Venezuela) N Pereira (United States) P Sampras	7	3	6
4	(United States) S DeVries (Australia) D Macpherson	6	6	3
(United States) L Jensen (United States) S Melville	6	6
2	(United States) B Garrow (United States) B Pearce	4	3

Final
WC	(Venezuela) N Pereira (United States) P Sampras	7^{7}	6^{6}	3
(United States) L Jensen (United States) S Melville	6^{5}	7^{8}	6
