= 1990 Prudential-Bache Securities Classic – Doubles =

Doubles
- 1990 Prudential-Bache Securities Classic
- 1989 Champions: (United States) Scott Davis (United States) Tim Pawsat

Final
- Champions: (United States) Scott Davis (United States) David Pate
- Runners-up: (Venezuela) Alfonso Mora (United States) Brian Page
- Score: 6–3, 7–6^{(7–5)}

Details
- Draw: 16
- Seeds: 4

Events
| Singles | Doubles |
| ← 1989 · | Prudential-Bache Securities Classic | · 1991 → |

Scott Davis and Tim Pawsat were the defending champions. Pawsat did not enter the event that year, while Davis participated alongside David Pate.
Davis eventually defended his title with Pate, defeating Alfonso Mora and Brian Page 6–3, 7–6^{(7–5)}, in the final.

== Seeds ==
1. (United States) Scott Davis / (United States) David Pate (champions)
2. (United States) Charles Beckman / (Australia) Broderick Dyke (quarterfinals)
3. (United States) Steve DeVries / (Australia) David Macpherson (first round)
4. (United States) Todd Nelson / (The Bahamas) Roger Smith (first round)

== Draw ==
=== Key ===
- Q = Qualifier
- WC = Wild card
- LL = Lucky loser
- Alt = Alternate
- SE = Special exempt
- PR = Protected ranking
- ITF = ITF entry
- JE = Junior exempt
- w/o = Walkover
- r = Retired
- d = Defaulted
- SR = Special ranking

=== Draw ===
First round
1 | (United States) S Davis (United States) D Pate | 6 | 4 | 6
(West Germany) A Mronz (Sweden) L-A Wahlgren | 4 | 6 | 1
(Puerto Rico) M Nido (United States) J Rive | 3 | 6 | 6
(United States) D Rostagno (West Germany) C Saceanu | 6 | 3 | 4
3 | (United States) S DeVries (Australia) D Macpherson | 6 | 6^{10} | 3
(Sweden) D Engel (Sweden) V Jansson | 2 | 7^{12} | 6
(South Africa) R Deppe (South Africa) B Talbot | 6 | 6
(United States) J Schor (United States) B Willenborg | 4 | 1
WC | (United States) A Hombrecher (United States) M Washington | 6 | 2 | 6
(United States) R Schmidt (United States) G Van Emburgh | 4 | 6 | 4
(Venezuela) A Mora (United States) B Page | 7^{7} | 6
4 | (United States) T Nelson (The Bahamas) R Smith | 6^{4} | 2
Q | (Switzerland) H Günthardt (West Germany) M Zoecke | 6^{5} | 6^{3}
(United States) G Layendecker (United States) L Shiras | 7^{7} | 7^{7}
(Sweden) R Bergh (United States) R Matuszewski | 6 | 2 | 4
2 | (United States) C Beckman (Australia) B Dyke | 4 | 6 | 6

Quarterfinals
1 | (United States) S Davis (United States) D Pate | 3 | 7^{7} | 6
(Puerto Rico) M Nido (United States) J Rive | 6 | 6^{5} | 2
(Sweden) D Engel (Sweden) V Jansson | 6 | 3 | 3
(South Africa) R Deppe (South Africa) B Talbot | 3 | 6 | 6
WC | (United States) A Hombrecher (United States) M Washington | 6 | 4 | 4
(Venezuela) A Mora (United States) B Page | 3 | 6 | 6
(United States) G Layendecker (United States) L Shiras | 6 | 6
2 | (United States) C Beckman (Australia) B Dyke | 3 | 4

Semifinals
1 | (United States) S Davis (United States) D Pate | 7^{7} | 7^{8}
(South Africa) R Deppe (South Africa) B Talbot | 6^{4} | 6^{6}
(Venezuela) A Mora (United States) B Page | 3 | 6 | 6
(United States) G Layendecker (United States) L Shiras | 6 | 4 | 2

Final
1 | (United States) S Davis (United States) D Pate | 6 | 7^{7}
(Venezuela) A Mora (United States) B Page | 3 | 6^{5}
