= 1990 French Open – Men's doubles =

Men's doubles
- 1990 French Open

Final
- Champion: (Spain) Sergio Casal (Spain) Emilio Sánchez
- Runner-up: (Socialist Federal Republic of Yugoslavia) Goran Ivanišević (Czechoslovakia) Petr Korda
- Score: 7–5, 6–3

Details
- Draw: 64
- Seeds: 16

Events
Singles	men	women		boys	girls
Doubles	men	women	mixed	boys	girls
WC Singles	men	women	quad
WC Doubles	men	women	quad
Legends	−45	45+	women
← 1989 ·	French Open	· 1991 →

Sergio Casal and Emilio Sánchez defeated Goran Ivanišević and Petr Korda in the final, 7–5, 6–3 to win the men's doubles tennis title at the 1990 French Open.

== Seeds ==
1. (United States) Rick Leach / (United States) Jim Pugh (third round)
2. (South Africa) Pieter Aldrich / (South Africa) Danie Visser (quarterfinals)
3. (Australia) John Fitzgerald / (Sweden) Anders Järryd (first round)
4. (United States) Jim Grabb / (United States) Patrick McEnroe (semifinals)
5. (United States) Scott Davis / (United States) David Pate (first round)
6. (Mexico) Jorge Lozano / (United States) Todd Witsken (quarterfinals)
7. (Spain) Sergio Casal / (Spain) Javier Sánchez (champions)
8. (Australia) Darren Cahill / (Australia) Mark Kratzmann (first round)
9. (France) Guy Forget / (Switzerland) Jakob Hlasek (first round)
10. (Canada) Grant Connell / (Canada) Glenn Michibata (third round)
11. (Iran) Mansour Bahrami / (France) Éric Winogradsky (first round)
12. (United States) Ken Flach / (United States) Robert Seguso (second round)
13. (United States) Tim Pawsat / (Czechoslovakia) Tomáš Šmíd (third round)
14. (West Germany) Udo Riglewski / (West Germany) Michael Stich (second round)
15. (Argentina) Gustavo Luza / (Brazil) Cássio Motta (third round)
16. (Socialist Federal Republic of Yugoslavia) Goran Ivanišević / (Czechoslovakia) Petr Korda (final)

== Draw ==
=== Key ===
- Q = Qualifier
- WC = Wild card
- LL = Lucky loser
- Alt = Alternate
- ITF = ITF entry
- PR = Protected ranking
- SR = Special ranking
- SE = Special exempt
- JE = Junior exempt
- JR = Junior Accelerator Programme entrant
- CO = College Accelerator Programme entrant
- NG = Next Gen Accelerator Program entrant
- w/o = Walkover
- r = Retired
- d = Defaulted

=== Finals ===
Quarterfinals
16	(Socialist Federal Republic of Yugoslavia) Goran Ivanišević (Czechoslovakia) Petr Korda	7	7
(Australia) Jason Stoltenberg (Australia) Todd Woodbridge	6	6
4	(United States) Jim Grabb (United States) Patrick McEnroe	6	6
6	(Mexico) Jorge Lozano (United States) Todd Witsken	1	3
(Netherlands) Paul Haarhuis (Netherlands) Mark Koevermans	6	6	15
(Czechoslovakia) Karel Nováček (Czechoslovakia) Milan Šrejber	2	7	13
7	(Spain) Sergio Casal (Spain) Emilio Sánchez	4	6	6
2	(South Africa) Pieter Aldrich (South Africa) Danie Visser	6	4	3

Semifinals
16	(Socialist Federal Republic of Yugoslavia) Goran Ivanišević (Czechoslovakia) Petr Korda	6	2	6
4	(United States) Jim Grabb (United States) Patrick McEnroe	2	6	3
(Netherlands) Paul Haarhuis (Netherlands) Mark Koevermans	6	4
7	(Spain) Sergio Casal (Spain) Emilio Sánchez	7	6

Final
16	(Socialist Federal Republic of Yugoslavia) Goran Ivanišević (Czechoslovakia) Petr Korda	5	3
7	(Spain) Sergio Casal (Spain) Emilio Sánchez	7	6

=== Top half ===
==== Section 1 ====
First round
1	(United States) R Leach (United States) J Pugh	4	6	7
(Belgium) E Masso (Czechoslovakia) M Vajda	6	0	5
(Sweden) D Engel (Sweden) T Nydahl	6	3	2
(United States) S Cannon (United States) K Jones	4	6	6
(United States) J Rive (United States) L Shiras	6	6
(New Zealand) B Derlin (United Kingdom) N Fulwood	1	4
(Sweden) P Henricsson (Sweden) N Utgren	3	6	3
16	(Socialist Federal Republic of Yugoslavia) G Ivanišević (Czechoslovakia) P Korda	6	3	6
9	(France) G Forget (Switzerland) J Hlasek	3	3
WC	(France) O Delaître (France) G Raoux	6	6
(Spain) S Bruguera (Venezuela) N Pereira	6	6
(Brazil) N Aerts (Brazil) F Roese	1	4
(Sweden) R Båthman (Sweden) R Bergh	4	6	5
(United States) C Beckman (United States) L Jensen	6	4	7
(Australia) J Stoltenberg (Australia) T Woodbridge	5	7	6
8	(Australia) D Cahill (Australia) M Kratzmann	7	5	4

Second round
1	(United States) R Leach (United States) J Pugh	6	6
(United States) S Cannon (United States) K Jones	4	2
(United States) J Rive (United States) L Shiras	4	4
16	(Socialist Federal Republic of Yugoslavia) G Ivanišević (Czechoslovakia) P Korda	6	6
WC	(France) O Delaître (France) G Raoux	6	4	5
(Spain) S Bruguera (Venezuela) N Pereira	4	6	7
(United States) C Beckman (United States) L Jensen	4	7	4
(Australia) J Stoltenberg (Australia) T Woodbridge	6	6	6

Third round
1	(United States) R Leach (United States) J Pugh	4	4
16	(Socialist Federal Republic of Yugoslavia) G Ivanišević (Czechoslovakia) P Korda	6	6
(Spain) S Bruguera (Venezuela) N Pereira	4	2
(Australia) J Stoltenberg (Australia) T Woodbridge	6	6

Quarterfinals
16	(Socialist Federal Republic of Yugoslavia) G Ivanišević (Czechoslovakia) P Korda	7	7
(Australia) J Stoltenberg (Australia) T Woodbridge	6	6

==== Section 2 ====
First round
4	(United States) J Grabb (United States) P McEnroe	6	6
(South Africa) R Deppe (South Africa) B Talbot	2	4
(Argentina) J Frana (Argentina) C Miniussi	5	6	7
(Peru) C di Laura (Uruguay) M Filippini	7	0	5
(Argentina) P Albano (Argentina) H de la Peña	6	2	4
(United States) B Shelton (Australia) S Youl	4	6	6
(Hungary) B Taróczy (United States) T Wilkison	3	4
14	(West Germany) U Riglewski (West Germany) M Stich	6	6
11	(Iran) M Bahrami (France) E Winogradsky	7	6	4
(United Kingdom) N Brown (Netherlands) M Schapers	6	7	6
(Czechoslovakia) D Rikl (Czechoslovakia) T Anzari	6	7
(Nigeria) N Odizor (Kenya) P Wekesa	3	6
(Spain) F Clavet (Puerto Rico) M Nido	6	6
WC	(France) A Boetsch (France) T Champion	3	4
(Spain) JC Báguena (Spain) F Roig	3	2
6	(Mexico) J Lozano (United States) T Witsken	6	6

Second round
4	(United States) J Grabb (United States) P McEnroe	6	6
(Argentina) J Frana (Argentina) C Miniussi	4	4
(United States) B Shelton (Australia) S Youl	6	4	7
14	(West Germany) U Riglewski (West Germany) M Stich	4	6	5
(United Kingdom) N Brown (Netherlands) M Schapers	1	1
(Czechoslovakia) D Rikl (Czechoslovakia) T Anzari	6	6
(Spain) F Clavet (Puerto Rico) M Nido	4	1
6	(Mexico) J Lozano (United States) T Witsken	6	6

Third round
4	(United States) J Grabb (United States) P McEnroe	7	6
(United States) B Shelton (Australia) S Youl	5	4
(Czechoslovakia) D Rikl (Czechoslovakia) T Anzari	6	0	4
6	(Mexico) J Lozano (United States) T Witsken	2	6	6

Quarterfinals
4	(United States) J Grabb (United States) P McEnroe	6	6
6	(Mexico) J Lozano (United States) T Witsken	1	3

=== Bottom half ===
==== Section 3 ====
First round
5	(United States) S Davis (United States) D Pate	6	1	4
(Denmark) M Mortensen (Netherlands) T Nijssen	3	6	6
(Netherlands) P Haarhuis (Netherlands) M Koevermans	6	6
(France) JP Fleurian (United States) D Rostagno	4	0
(Brazil) L Mattar (Uruguay) D Pérez	2	6	6
(United Kingdom) J Bates (United Kingdom) A Castle	6	2	1
(Spain) T Carbonell (Spain) C Costa	3	1
12	(United States) K Flach (United States) R Seguso	6	6
13	(United States) T Pawsat (Czechoslovakia) T Šmíd	2	7	6
(United States) M De Palmer (Italy) D Nargiso	6	6	1
(Sweden) V Jansson (United States) S Warner	4	4
WC	(France) T Benhabiles (France) S Grenier	6	6
WC	(France) J Potier (France) T Tulasne	4	1
(West Germany) A Mronz (United States) G Van Emburgh	6	6
(Czechoslovakia) K Nováček (Czechoslovakia) M Šrejber	7	7
3	(Australia) J Fitzgerald (Sweden) A Järryd	6	6

Second round
(Denmark) M Mortensen (Netherlands) T Nijssen	6	3	8
(Netherlands) P Haarhuis (Netherlands) M Koevermans	2	6	10
(Brazil) L Mattar (Uruguay) D Pérez	6	6
12	(United States) K Flach (United States) R Seguso	3	2
13	(United States) T Pawsat (Czechoslovakia) T Šmíd	6	7
WC	(France) T Benhabiles (France) S Grenier	1	6
(West Germany) A Mronz (United States) G Van Emburgh	5	4
(Czechoslovakia) K Nováček (Czechoslovakia) M Šrejber	7	6

Third round
(Netherlands) P Haarhuis (Netherlands) M Koevermans	3	6	6
(Brazil) L Mattar (Uruguay) D Pérez	6	3	4
13	(United States) T Pawsat (Czechoslovakia) T Šmíd	4	1
(Czechoslovakia) K Nováček (Czechoslovakia) M Šrejber	6	6

Quarterfinals
(Netherlands) P Haarhuis (Netherlands) M Koevermans	2	7	13
(Czechoslovakia) K Nováček (Czechoslovakia) M Šrejber	6	6	15

==== Section 4 ====
First round
7	(Spain) S Casal (Spain) J Sánchez	6	6
(Brazil) M Menezes (Czechoslovakia) L Pimek	2	4
(Czechoslovakia) J Čihák (Czechoslovakia) C Suk	6	6	6
(United States) B Pearce (United States) R Reneberg	4	7	3
(Argentina) A Mancini (Switzerland) M Rosset	6	0	6
(Australia) B Dyke (Australia) L Warder	3	6	8
(United States) P Galbraith (Australia) D Macpherson	6	6	3
10	(Canada) G Connell (Canada) G Michibata	4	7	6
15	(Argentina) G Luza (Brazil) C Motta	6	4	6
WC	(France) C Pioline (France) F Santoro	1	6	1
(Venezuela) A González Mora (United States) B Page	7	7
(United States) S DeVries (United States) K Kinnear	5	6
(United States) T Nelson (The Bahamas) R Smith	4	6
(United States) M Davis (South Africa) S Kruger	6	7
(Spain) J Sánchez (United States) D Wheaton	6	3
2	(South Africa) P Aldrich (South Africa) D Visser	7	6

Second round
7	(Spain) S Casal (Spain) J Sánchez	4	6	6
(Czechoslovakia) J Čihák (Czechoslovakia) C Suk	6	3	2
(Australia) B Dyke (Australia) L Warder	3	3
10	(Canada) G Connell (Canada) G Michibata	6	6
15	(Argentina) G Luza (Brazil) C Motta	6	6
(Venezuela) A González Mora (United States) B Page	2	2
(United States) M Davis (South Africa) S Kruger	6	6
2	(South Africa) P Aldrich (South Africa) D Visser	7	7

Third round
7	(Spain) S Casal (Spain) J Sánchez	6	5	6
10	(Canada) G Connell (Canada) G Michibata	4	7	2
15	(Argentina) G Luza (Brazil) C Motta	6	3	2
2	(South Africa) P Aldrich (South Africa) D Visser	4	6	6

Quarterfinals
7	(Spain) S Casal (Spain) J Sánchez	4	6	6
2	(South Africa) P Aldrich (South Africa) D Visser	6	4	3
