= 1990 US Open – Men's doubles =

Men's doubles
- 1990 US Open

Final
- Champion: (South Africa) Pieter Aldrich (South Africa) Danie Visser
- Runner-up: (United States) Paul Annacone (United States) David Wheaton
- Score: 6–2, 7–6^{(7–3)}, 6–2

Details
- Draw: 64
- Seeds: 16

Events
Singles	men	women		boys	girls
Doubles	men	women	mixed	boys	girls
WC Singles	men	women	quad
WC Doubles	men	women	quad
Legends	men	women	mixed
- US Open

The men's doubles tournament at the 1990 US Open was held from August 27 to September 9, 1990, on the outdoor hard courts of the USTA National Tennis Center in New York City, United States. Pieter Aldrich and Danie Visser won the title, defeating Paul Annacone and David Wheaton in the final.

== Seeds ==
1. (United States) Rick Leach / (United States) Jim Pugh (first round)
2. (South Africa) Pieter Aldrich / (South Africa) Danie Visser (champions)
3. (Spain) Sergio Casal / (Spain) Emilio Sánchez (second round)
4. (Canada) Grant Connell / (Canada) Glenn Michibata (third round)
5. (United States) Scott Davis / (United States) David Pate (second round)
6. (Australia) Darren Cahill / (Australia) Mark Kratzmann (second round)
7. (France) Guy Forget / (Switzerland) Jakob Hlasek (quarterfinals)
8. (Mexico) Jorge Lozano / (United States) Todd Witsken (first round)
9. (Socialist Federal Republic of Yugoslavia) Goran Ivanišević / (Czechoslovakia) Petr Korda (second round)
10. (West Germany) Udo Riglewski / (West Germany) Michael Stich (first round)
11. (United Kingdom) Neil Broad / (South Africa) Gary Muller (first round)
12. (Italy) Omar Camporese / (Spain) Javier Sánchez (second round)
13. (United Kingdom) Jeremy Bates / (United States) Kevin Curren (second round)
14. (United States) Patrick McEnroe / (United States) Richey Reneberg (third round)
15. (United States) Ken Flach / (United States) Robert Seguso (third round)
16. (Australia) Jason Stoltenberg / (Australia) Todd Woodbridge (second round)

== Draw ==
Key

- Q = Qualifier
- WC = Wild card
- LL = Lucky loser
- Alt = Alternate
- ITF = ITF entry
- PR = Protected ranking
- SR = Special ranking
- SE = Special exempt
- JE = Junior exempt
- JR = Junior Accelerator Programme entrant
- CO = College Accelerator Programme entrant
- NG = Next Gen Accelerator Program entrant
- w/o = Walkover
- r = Retired
- d = Defaulted

=== Finals ===
Quarterfinals
(Spain) Sergi Bruguera (Spain) Tomás Carbonell	5	7	6	4	3
(United States) Paul Annacone (United States) David Wheaton	7	6	4	6	6
(United States) Patrick Galbraith (United States) Kelly Jones	7	6	4	4	6
(Sweden) Anders Järryd (South Africa) Christo van Rensburg	6	3	6	6	1
(United Kingdom) Andrew Castle (The Bahamas) Roger Smith	3	5	7	6	3
(United States) Brian Garrow (United States) Sven Salumaa	6	7	5	3	6
7	(France) Guy Forget (Switzerland) Jakob Hlasek	6	6	6	6	4
2	(South Africa) Pieter Aldrich (South Africa) Danie Visser	7	2	3	7	6

Semifinals
(United States) Paul Annacone (United States) David Wheaton	7	7	6	7
(United States) Patrick Galbraith (United States) Kelly Jones	6	6	7	6
(United States) Brian Garrow (United States) Sven Salumaa	6	6	6	6	2
2	(South Africa) Pieter Aldrich (South Africa) Danie Visser	4	7	3	7	6

Final
(United States) Paul Annacone (United States) David Wheaton	2	6^{3}	2
2	(South Africa) Pieter Aldrich (South Africa) Danie Visser	6	7	6

=== Top half ===
==== Section 1 ====
First round
1	(United States) R Leach (United States) J Pugh	6	6
(Brazil) N Aerts (Brazil) D Marcelino	7	7
(United States) D Eisenman (United States) M Lucena	4	4
(France) O Delaître (Switzerland) M Rosset	6	6
(Italy) G Pozzi (Hungary) B Taróczy	6	0	4
(Spain) S Bruguera (Spain) T Carbonell	2	6	6
(New Zealand) K Evernden (Venezuela) N Pereira	6	7	1
16	(Australia) J Stoltenberg (Australia) T Woodbridge	7	6	6
10	(West Germany) U Riglewski (West Germany) M Stich	1	2
(United States) P Annacone (United States) D Wheaton	6	6
(United States) B Pearce (United States) K Kinnear	6	6
(United States) T Nelson (United States) B Shelton	3	4
(United States) J Courier (United States) P Sampras	6	6	4
(United States) J Brown (United States) S Melville	3	7	6
(United States) C Beckman (United States) L Jensen	6	6
8	(Mexico) J Lozano (United States) T Witsken	1	4

Second round
(Brazil) N Aerts (Brazil) D Marcelino	6	6
(France) O Delaître (Switzerland) M Rosset	2	3
(Spain) S Bruguera (Spain) T Carbonell	1	7	6
16	(Australia) J Stoltenberg (Australia) T Woodbridge	6	6	4
(United States) P Annacone (United States) D Wheaton	4	6	7
(United States) B Pearce (United States) K Kinnear	6	2	6
(United States) J Brown (United States) S Melville	6	6	6
(United States) C Beckman (United States) L Jensen	2	7	3

Third round
(Brazil) N Aerts (Brazil) D Marcelino	6	4
(Spain) S Bruguera (Spain) T Carbonell	7	6
(United States) P Annacone (United States) D Wheaton	6	6
(United States) J Brown (United States) S Melville	1	4

Quarterfinals
(Spain) S Bruguera (Spain) T Carbonell	7	6	4	6	6
(United States) P Annacone (United States) D Wheaton	5	7	6	4	3

==== Section 2 ====
First round
4	(Canada) G Connell (Canada) G Michibata	7	4	6
(United States) A Hombrecher (United States) M Washington	6	6	4
(United States) S Cannon (United States) J Canter	4	6	2
(Brazil) L Mattar (Brazil) F Roese	6	4	6
(United States) P Galbraith (United States) K Jones	6	5	6
(Denmark) M Mortensen (Czechoslovakia) K Nováček	3	7	4
(South Africa) B Talbot (Australia) S Youl	7	6	3
13	(United Kingdom) J Bates (United States) K Curren	5	7	6
11	(United Kingdom) N Broad (South Africa) G Muller	4	5
(Australia) P Doohan (Australia) L Warder	6	7
(Netherlands) HJ Davids (Netherlands) P Haarhuis	3	2
(Argentina) J Frana (Argentina) C Miniussi	6	6
(United States) S DeVries (Australia) D Macpherson	4	6	7
(United States) J Rive (United States) R Van't Hof	6	3	5
(Sweden) A Järryd (South Africa) C van Rensburg	6	3	6
5	(United States) S Davis (United States) D Pate	4	6	3

Second round
4	(Canada) G Connell (Canada) G Michibata	6	6
(Brazil) L Mattar (Brazil) F Roese	4	4
(United States) P Galbraith (United States) K Jones	6	6	7
13	(United Kingdom) J Bates (United States) K Curren	4	7	6
(Australia) P Doohan (Australia) L Warder	7	5	7
(Argentina) J Frana (Argentina) C Miniussi	5	7	5
(United States) S DeVries (Australia) D Macpherson	6	2	4
(Sweden) A Järryd (South Africa) C van Rensburg	4	6	6

Third round
4	(Canada) G Connell (Canada) G Michibata	6	6	4
(United States) P Galbraith (United States) K Jones	4	7	6
(Australia) P Doohan (Australia) L Warder	4	6	2
(Sweden) A Järryd (South Africa) C van Rensburg	6	3	6

Quarterfinals
(United States) P Galbraith (United States) K Jones	7	6	4	4	6
(Sweden) A Järryd (South Africa) C van Rensburg	6	3	6	6	1

=== Bottom half ===
==== Section 3 ====
First round
6	(Australia) D Cahill (Australia) M Kratzmann	4	2
(Australia) P Cash (Australia) W Masur	6	6
(United Kingdom) A Castle (The Bahamas) R Smith	6	5	6
(South Africa) S Kruger (United States) M Davis	3	7	2
(South Africa) R Deppe (United States) B Garnett	6	6	6
(Sweden) F Nilsson (Sweden) T Svantesson	2	7	3
(Czechoslovakia) T Šmíd (Czechoslovakia) C Suk	4	4
12	(Italy) O Camporese (Spain) J Sánchez	6	6
14	(United States) P McEnroe (United States) R Reneberg	6	7
(Mexico) L Lavalle (Peru) J Yzaga	3	6
(United States) P Chamberlin (United States) T Wilkison	6	7
(Nigeria) N Odizor (Kenya) P Wekesa	4	6
(United States) J Berger (United States) D Flach	6	4
(United States) B Garrow (United States) S Salumaa	7	6
(Venezuela) A González Mora (United States) B Page	4	6	4
3	(Spain) S Casal (Spain) E Sánchez	6	4	6

Second round
(Australia) P Cash (Australia) W Masur	6	3	4
(United Kingdom) A Castle (The Bahamas) R Smith	2	6	6
(South Africa) R Deppe (United States) B Garnett	7	6
12	(Italy) O Camporese (Spain) J Sánchez	6	4
14	(United States) P McEnroe (United States) R Reneberg	7	6
(United States) P Chamberlin (United States) T Wilkison	5	2
(United States) B Garrow (United States) S Salumaa	6	6
3	(Spain) S Casal (Spain) E Sánchez	3	2

Third round
(United Kingdom) A Castle (The Bahamas) R Smith	6	6
(South Africa) R Deppe (United States) B Garnett	4	4
14	(United States) P McEnroe (United States) R Reneberg	3	6
4	(United States) B Garrow (United States) S Salumaa	6	7

Quarterfinals
(United Kingdom) A Castle (The Bahamas) R Smith	3	5	7	6	3
(United States) B Garrow (United States) S Salumaa	6	7	5	3	6

==== Section 4 ====
First round
7	(France) G Forget (Switzerland) J Hlasek	7	7
(United States) J McEnroe (Australia) M Woodforde	6	6
(United States) S Bryan (United States) T Martin	6	7
(United Kingdom) N Brown (Czechoslovakia) L Pimek	3	5
(South Africa) W Ferreira (South Africa) P Norval	6	3	7
(United States) E Amend (South Africa) M Barnard	2	6	5
(Italy) C Caratti (Italy) D Nargiso	3	3
9	(Socialist Federal Republic of Yugoslavia) G Ivanišević (Czechoslovakia) P Korda	6	6
15	(United States) K Flach (United States) R Seguso	7	3	6
(Argentina) P Albano (Argentina) M Jaite	6	6	3
(Sweden) R Bergh (Sweden) P Henricsson	3	6	7
(Sweden) V Jansson (United States) J Sobel	6	3	6
(Iran) M Bahrami (France) JP Fleurian	7	6
(United States) I Baron (United States) M Flanagan	6	3
(Australia) B Dyke (Sweden) P Lundgren	7	2	0
2	(South Africa) P Aldrich (South Africa) D Visser	5	6	6

Second round
7	(France) G Forget (Switzerland) J Hlasek	6	6
(United States) S Bryan (United States) T Martin	3	3
(South Africa) W Ferreira (South Africa) P Norval	0	7	6
9	(Socialist Federal Republic of Yugoslavia) G Ivanišević (Czechoslovakia) P Korda	6	5	4
15	(United States) K Flach (United States) R Seguso	6	7
(Sweden) R Bergh (Sweden) P Henricsson	4	5
(Iran) M Bahrami (France) JP Fleurian	6	4
2	(South Africa) P Aldrich (South Africa) D Visser	7	6

Third round
7	(France) G Forget (Switzerland) J Hlasek	6	6
(South Africa) W Ferreira (South Africa) P Norval	3	2
15	(United States) K Flach (United States) R Seguso
2	(South Africa) P Aldrich (South Africa) D Visser	w/o

Quarterfinals
7	(France) G Forget (Switzerland) J Hlasek	6	6	6	6	4
2	(South Africa) P Aldrich (South Africa) D Visser	7	4	3	7	6
