= 1991 Prudential-Bache Securities Classic =

- Date: April 1–7
- Edition: 7th
- Category: ATP World Series
- Draw: 32S / 16D
- Prize money: $225,000
- Surface: Hard / outdoor
- Location: Orlando, Florida, U.S.

Champions

Singles
- (United States) Andre Agassi

Doubles
- (United States) Luke Jensen / (United States) Scott Melville
← 1990 ·	Prudential-Bache Securities Classic	· 1992 →

The 1991 Prudential-Bache Securities Classic was a men's tennis tournament played on outdoor hard courts in Orlando, Florida, United States that was part of the ATP World Series of the 1991 ATP Tour. It was the seventh edition of the tournament and took place from April 1 through April 7, 1991. First-seeded Andre Agassi won the singles title, his second at the event after 1989.

== Finals ==
=== Singles ===
(United States) Andre Agassi defeated (United States) Derrick Rostagno 6–2, 1–6, 6–3

- It was Agassi's 1st singles title of the year, and the 13th of his career.

=== Doubles ===
(United States) Luke Jensen / (United States) Scott Melville defeated (Venezuela) Nicolás Pereira / (United States) Pete Sampras 6–7^{(5–7)}, 7–6^{(8–6)}, 6–3
