= 1990 Prudential-Bache Securities Classic =

- Date: April 2–8
- Edition: 6th
- Category: ATP World Series
- Draw: 32S / 16D
- Prize money: $225,000
- Surface: Hard / outdoor
- Location: Orlando, U.S.

Champions

Singles
- (United States) Brad Gilbert

Doubles
- (United States) Scott Davis / (United States) David Pate
← 1989 ·	Prudential-Bache Securities Classic	· 1991 →

The 1990 Prudential-Bache Securities Classic (known as such in 1990 for sponsorship reasons) was a men's tennis tournament played on outdoor hard courts. It was the 6th edition of the event known that year as the Prudential-Bache Securities Classic, and was part of the ATP World Series of the 1990 ATP Tour. It took place in Orlando, United States, from April 2 through April 8, 1990. First-seeded Brad Gilbert won the singles title.

== Finals ==
=== Singles ===
(United States) Brad Gilbert defeated (South Africa) Christo van Rensburg 6–2, 6–1

- It was Gilbert's 2nd singles title of the year, and the 19th of his career.

=== Doubles ===
(United States) Scott Davis / (United States) David Pate defeated (Venezuela) Alfonso Mora / (United States) Brian Page, 6–3, 7–6^{(7–5)}

- It was Davis' 1st doubles title of the year, and the 11th of his career. It was Pate's 1st doubles title of the year, and the 10th of his career.
