= 1991 Prudential-Bache Securities Classic – Singles =

Singles
- 1991 Prudential-Bache Securities Classic

Final
- Champion: (United States) Andre Agassi
- Runner-up: (United States) Derrick Rostagno
- Score: 6–2, 1–6, 6–3

Details
- Draw: 32 (3WC/4Q/1LL)
- Seeds: 8

Events
Singles	Doubles
← 1990 ·	Verizon Tennis Challenge	· 1992 →

Brad Gilbert was the defending champion, but lost in the quarterfinals to MaliVai Washington.

Andre Agassi won the title by defeating Derrick Rostagno 6–2, 1–6, 6–3 in the final.

== Seeds ==
1. (United States) Andre Agassi (champion)
2. (United States) Pete Sampras (semifinals)
3. (United States) Brad Gilbert (quarterfinals)
4. (United States) Derrick Rostagno (final)
5. (United States) Scott Davis (first round)
6. (United States) Jimmy Arias (quarterfinals)
7. (Canada) Grant Connell (first round)
8. (United States) David Pate (quarterfinals)

== Draw ==
=== Key ===
- Q = Qualifier
- WC = Wild card
- LL = Lucky loser
- Alt = Alternate
- SE = Special exempt
- PR = Protected ranking
- ITF = ITF entry
- JE = Junior exempt
- w/o = Walkover
- r = Retired
- d = Defaulted
- SR = Special ranking

=== Finals ===
Semifinals
1	(United States) Andre Agassi	6	7^{8}
(United States) MaliVai Washington	4	6^{6}
4	(United States) Derrick Rostagno	7	6
2	(United States) Pete Sampras	5	4

Final
1	(United States) Andre Agassi	6	1	6
4	(United States) Derrick Rostagno	2	6	3

=== Top half ===
First round
1	(United States) A Agassi	6	6
(United States) B Garrow	2	4
(Brazil) D Marcelino	3	6	6^{4}
(Sweden) D Engel	6	3	7^{7}
Q	(United States) TJ Middleton	3	1
(United States) B Shelton	6	6
(United States) C Adams	6	4	6
7	(Canada) G Connell	3	6	3
3	(United States) B Gilbert	2	6	6
(Chile) P Rebolledo	6	1	1
(Belgium) B Wuyts	4	2
(Germany) P Baur	6	6
(Mexico) L Herrera	6	5	4
(United States) MV Washington	4	7	6
Q	(Venezuela) N Pereira	7	6
5	(United States) S Davis	5	1

Second round
1	(United States) A Agassi	6	6
(Sweden) D Engel	4	4
(United States) B Shelton	6	6^{6}	6^{4}
(United States) C Adams	3	7^{8}	7^{7}
3	(United States) B Gilbert	6	7^{7}
(Germany) P Baur	3	6^{5}
(United States) MV Washington	6	6
Q	(Venezuela) N Pereira	1	3

Quarterfinals
1	(United States) A Agassi	6	7^{7}
(United States) C Adams	4	6^{4}
3	(United States) B Gilbert	2	7^{8}	2
(United States) MV Washington	6	6^{6}	6

Semifinals
1	(United States) A Agassi	6	7^{8}
(United States) MV Washington	4	6^{6}

=== Bottom half ===
First round
6	(United States) J Arias	7^{7}	2	6
Q	(Australia) D Macpherson	6^{4}	6	4
WC	(United States) D Witt	7^{8}	6
WC	(United States) T Mayotte	6^{6}	2
(Sweden) T Högstedt	3	6	6
(Australia) J Anderson	6	3	2
WC	(United States) J Connors	1	4
4	(United States) D Rostagno	6	6
8	(United States) D Pate	6	7^{7}
(United States) C Garner	3	6^{2}
(United States) J Tarango	7^{7}	6
Q	(United States) K Flach	6^{5}	4
(Italy) D Nargiso	6	7^{7}
LL	(United States) R Matuszewski	3	6^{5}
(United States) B Pearce	2	2
2	(United States) P Sampras	6	6

Second round
6	(United States) J Arias	6^{2}	7^{7}	6
WC	(United States) D Witt	7^{7}	6^{3}	1
(Sweden) T Högstedt	6	2	2
4	(United States) D Rostagno	4	6	6
8	(United States) D Pate	6	6^{4}	6
(United States) J Tarango	2	7^{7}	1
(Italy) D Nargiso	3	6^{8}
2	(United States) P Sampras	6	7^{10}

Quarterfinals
6	(United States) J Arias	1	4
4	(United States) D Rostagno	6	6
8	(United States) D Pate	3	3
2	(United States) P Sampras	6	6

Semifinals
4	(United States) D Rostagno	7	6
2	(United States) P Sampras	5	4
