= Sergio Casal =

Spanish tennis player (born 1962)

- Full name: Sergio Casal Martínez
- Country (sports): Spain
- Residence: Barcelona, Spain
- Born: 8 September 1962 (age 64) Barcelona, Spain
- Height: 1.85 m (6 ft 1 in)
- Turned pro: 1981
- Retired: 1995
- Plays: Right-handed (one-handed backhand)
- Prize money: US$2,100,495

Singles
- Career record: 124–148
- Career titles: 1
- Highest ranking: No. 31 (11 November 1985)

Grand Slam singles results
- French Open: 2R (1983, 1986, 1987)
- Wimbledon: 2R (1987)
- US Open: 3R (1986)

Doubles
- Career record: 500–255
- Career titles: 47
- Highest ranking: No. 3 (25 February 1991)

Grand Slam doubles results
- Australian Open: 2R (1990, 1992, 1993, 1994)
- French Open: W (1990)
- Wimbledon: F (1987)
- US Open: W (1988)
Medal record
Olympic Games
| Silver medal – second place | 1988 Seoul | Doubles |

Sergio Casal Martínez (born 8 September 1962) is a former professional tennis player from Spain. During his career, he won three Grand Slam doubles titles, as well as the men's doubles silver medal at the 1988 Summer Olympics.

Casal turned professional in 1981. He won his first top-level doubles title in 1983 at Aix-en-Provence. He captured a total of 47 men's doubles titles during his career. Partnering fellow Spaniard Emilio Sánchez, he won the men's doubles titles at the US Open in 1988 and the French Open in 1990. The pair were also the men's doubles runners-up at Wimbledon in 1987 and won the silver medal for Spain at the 1988 Olympics in Seoul. Casal also won the US Open mixed doubles title in 1986, partnering Raffaella Reggi. Casal's career-high doubles ranking was world No. 3.

Casal won one top-level singles title at Florence in 1985. He was a singles runner-up at Aix-en-Provence in 1983, and at the Paris Open in 1986. His career-high singles ranking was world No. 31. He beat Boris Becker in a 1987 Davis Cup match. Casal was a member of the Spanish team which won the World Team Cup in 1992. He retired from the professional tour in 1995.

In 2017, he received from the International Tennis Federation (ITF) its highest accolade, the Philippe Chatrier Award, for his contributions to tennis.

== Grand Slam finals ==
=== Doubles: 3 (2 titles, 1 runner-up) ===
| Result | Year | Championship | Surface | Partner | Opponents | Score |
|---|---|---|---|---|---|---|
| Win | 1988 | US Open | Hard | (Spain) Emilio Sánchez | (United States) Rick Leach (United States) Jim Pugh | walkover |
| Loss | 1987 | Wimbledon | Grass | (Spain) Emilio Sánchez | (United States) Ken Flach (United States) Robert Seguso | 3–6, 6–7^{(6–8)}, 7–6^{(7–3)}, 6–1, 6–4 |
| Win | 1990 | French Open | Clay | (Spain) Emilio Sánchez | (Socialist Federal Republic of Yugoslavia) Goran Ivanišević (Czechoslovakia) Petr Korda | 7–5, 6–3 |

=== Mixed doubles: 1 (1 title) ===
| Result | Year | Championship | Surface | Partner | Opponents | Score |
|---|---|---|---|---|---|---|
| Win | 1986 | US Open | Hard | (Italy) Raffaella Reggi | (United States) Martina Navratilova (United States) Peter Fleming | 6–4, 6–4 |

== Career finals ==
=== Doubles: 73 (47 wins / 26 losses) ===
| Legend Grand Slam (2) Tennis Masters Cup (0) ATP Masters Series (3) ATP Championship Series (1) ATP Tour (41) | Titles by surface Hard (7) Clay (38) Grass (0) Carpet (2) |

| Result | W-L | Date | Tournament | Surface | Partner | Opponents | Score |
|---|---|---|---|---|---|---|---|
| Loss | 0–1 | May 1983 | Aix-en-Provence, France | Clay | (Chile) Iván Camus | (France) Henri Leconte (France) Gilles Moretton | 6–2, 1–6, 2–6 |
| Loss | 0–2 | Apr 1985 | Munich, West Germany | Clay | (Spain) Emilio Sánchez | (Australia) Mark Edmondson (Australia) Kim Warwick | 6–4, 5–7, 5–7 |
| Loss | 0–3 | Jul 1985 | Båstad, Sweden | Clay | (Spain) Emilio Sánchez | (Sweden) Stefan Edberg (Sweden) Anders Järryd | 0–6, 6–7 |
| Win | 1–3 | Aug 1985 | Kitzbühel, Austria | Clay | (Spain) Emilio Sánchez | (Italy) Paolo Canè (Italy) Claudio Panatta | 6–3, 3–6, 6–2 |
| Loss | 1–4 | Sep 1985 | Palermo, Italy | Clay | (Spain) Emilio Sánchez | (United Kingdom) Colin Dowdeswell (Sweden) Joakim Nyström | 4–6, 7–6, 6–7 |
| Win | 2–4 | Sep 1985 | Geneva, Switzerland | Clay | (Spain) Emilio Sánchez | (Brazil) Carlos Kirmayr (Brazil) Cássio Motta | 6–4, 4–6, 7–5 |
| Win | 3–4 | Sep 1985 | Barcelona, Spain | Clay | (Spain) Emilio Sánchez | (Sweden) Jan Gunnarsson (Denmark) Michael Mortensen | 6–3, 6–3 |
| Loss | 3–5 | Nov 1985 | Vienna, Austria | Hard (i) | (Spain) Emilio Sánchez | (United States) Mike De Palmer (United States) Gary Donnelly | 4–6, 3–6 |
| Loss | 3–6 | Apr 1986 | Bari, Italy | Clay | (Spain) Emilio Sánchez | (United States) Gary Donnelly (Czechoslovakia) Tomáš Šmíd | 6–2, 4–6, 4–6 |
| Win | 4–6 | May 1986 | Munich, West Germany | Clay | (Spain) Emilio Sánchez | (Australia) Broderick Dyke (Australia) Wally Masur | 6–3, 4–6, 6–3 |
| Win | 5–6 | May 1986 | Florence, Italy | Clay | (Spain) Emilio Sánchez | (United States) Mike De Palmer (United States) Gary Donnelly | 6–4, 7–6 |
| Win | 6–6 | Jul 1986 | Gstaad, Switzerland | Clay | (Spain) Emilio Sánchez | (Sweden) Stefan Edberg (Sweden) Joakim Nyström | 6–3, 3–6, 6–3 |
| Win | 7–6 | Jul 1986 | Båstad, Sweden | Clay | (Spain) Emilio Sánchez | (South Africa) Craig Campbell (United States) Joey Rive | 6–4, 6–2 |
| Win | 8–6 | Sep 1986 | Hamburg, West Germany | Clay | (Spain) Emilio Sánchez | (West Germany) Boris Becker (West Germany) Eric Jelen | 6–4, 6–1 |
| Win | 9–6 | Feb 1987 | Philadelphia, United States | Carpet | (Spain) Emilio Sánchez | (South Africa) Christo Steyn (South Africa) Danie Visser | 3–6, 6–1, 7–6 |
| Loss | 9–7 | Feb 1987 | Memphis, United States | Hard (i) | (Spain) Emilio Sánchez | (Sweden) Anders Järryd (Sweden) Jonas Svensson | 4–6, 2–6 |
| Loss | 9–8 | Apr 1987 | Milan, Italy | Carpet | (Spain) Emilio Sánchez | (West Germany) Boris Becker (Socialist Federal Republic of Yugoslavia) Slobodan Živojinović | 6–3, 3–6, 4–6 |
| Win | 10–8 | Apr 1987 | Nice, France | Clay | (Spain) Emilio Sánchez | (Switzerland) Claudio Mezzadri (Italy) Gianni Ocleppo | 6–3, 6–3 |
| Loss | 10–9 | May 1987 | Munich, West Germany | Clay | (Spain) Emilio Sánchez | (United States) Jim Pugh (United States) Blaine Willenborg | 6–7, 6–4, 4–6 |
| Win | 11–9 | Jun 1987 | Bologna, Italy | Clay | (Spain) Emilio Sánchez | (Italy) Claudio Panatta (United States) Blaine Willenborg | 6–3, 6–2 |
| Loss | 11–10 | Jul 1987 | Wimbledon, London | Grass | (Spain) Emilio Sánchez | (United States) Ken Flach (United States) Robert Seguso | 6–3, 7–6, 6–7, 1–6, 4–6 |
| Win | 12–10 | Jul 1987 | Bordeaux, France | Clay | (Spain) Emilio Sánchez | (Australia) Darren Cahill (Australia) Mark Woodforde | 6–3, 6–3 |
| Win | 13–10 | Aug 1987 | Kitzbühel, Austria | Clay | (Spain) Emilio Sánchez | (Czechoslovakia) Miloslav Mečíř (Czechoslovakia) Tomáš Šmíd | 7–6, 7–6 |
| Loss | 13–11 | Sep 1987 | Madrid, Spain | Clay | (Spain) Emilio Sánchez | (Peru) Carlos di Laura (Spain) Javier Sánchez | 3–6, 6–3, 4–6 |
| Loss | 13–12 | Nov 1987 | São Paulo, Brazil | Hard | (Spain) Tomás Carbonell | (Israel) Gilad Bloom (Spain) Javier Sánchez | 3–6, 7–6, 4–6 |
| Win | 14–12 | Nov 1987 | Buenos Aires, Argentina | Clay | (Spain) Tomás Carbonell | (United States) Jay Berger (Argentina) Horacio de la Peña | W/O |
| Win | 15–12 | Nov 1987 | Itaparica, Brazil | Hard | (Spain) Emilio Sánchez | (Mexico) Jorge Lozano (Uruguay) Diego Pérez | 6–2, 6–2 |
| Win | 16–12 | Apr 1988 | Madrid, Spain | Clay | (Spain) Emilio Sánchez | (Australia) Jason Stoltenberg (Australia) Todd Woodbridge | 6–7, 7–6, 6–4 |
| Win | 17–12 | Apr 1988 | Monte Carlo, Monaco | Clay | (Spain) Emilio Sánchez | (France) Henri Leconte (Czechoslovakia) Ivan Lendl | 6–1, 6–3 |
| Win | 18–12 | Jul 1988 | Stuttgart Outdoor, West Germany | Clay | (Spain) Emilio Sánchez | (Sweden) Anders Järryd (Denmark) Michael Mortensen | 4–6, 6–3, 6–4 |
| Win | 19–12 | Aug 1988 | Hilversum, Netherlands | Clay | (Spain) Emilio Sánchez | (Sweden) Magnus Gustafsson (Argentina) Guillermo Pérez Roldán | 7–6, 6–3 |
| Win | 20–12 | Aug 1988 | Kitzbühel, Austria | Clay | (Spain) Emilio Sánchez | (Sweden) Joakim Nyström (Italy) Claudio Panatta | 6–4, 7–5 |
| Win | 21–12 | Sep 1988 | US Open, New York | Hard | (Spain) Emilio Sánchez | (United States) Rick Leach (United States) Jim Pugh | W/O |
| Win | 22–12 | Sep 1988 | Barcelona, Spain | Clay | (Spain) Emilio Sánchez | (Switzerland) Claudio Mezzadri (Uruguay) Diego Pérez | 6–4, 6–3 |
| Loss | 22–13 | Sep 1988 | Seoul Olympics, South Korea | Hard | (Spain) Emilio Sánchez | (United States) Ken Flach (United States) Robert Seguso | 3–6, 4–6, 7–6, 7–6, 7–9 |
| Win | 23–13 | Nov 1988 | Itaparica, Brazil | Hard | (Spain) Emilio Sánchez | (Mexico) Jorge Lozano (United States) Todd Witsken | 7–6, 7–6 |
| Loss | 23–14 | Dec 1988 | Masters Doubles, London | Carpet | (Spain) Emilio Sánchez | (United States) Rick Leach (United States) Jim Pugh | 4–6, 3–6, 6–2, 0–6 |
| Win | 24–14 | Jun 1989 | Bologna, Italy | Clay | (Spain) Javier Sánchez Vicario | (Sweden) Tomas Nydahl (Sweden) Jorgen Windahl | 6–2, 6–3 |
| Loss | 24–15 | Jun 1989 | Bari, Italy | Clay | (Spain) Javier Sánchez Vicario | (Italy) Simone Colombo (Switzerland) Claudio Mezzadri | 6–0, 3–6, 3–6 |
| Loss | 24–16 | Sep 1989 | Barcelona, Spain | Clay | (Czechoslovakia) Tomáš Šmíd | (Argentina) Gustavo Luza (Argentina) Christian Miniussi | 3–6, 3–6 |
| Loss | 24–17 | Jan 1990 | Wellington, New Zealand | Hard | (Spain) Emilio Sánchez | (New Zealand) Kelly Evernden (Venezuela) Nicolás Pereira | 4–6, 6–7 |
| Win | 25–17 | Apr 1990 | Estoril, Portugal | Clay | (Spain) Emilio Sánchez | (Italy) Omar Camporese (Italy) Paolo Canè | 7–5, 4–6, 7–5 |
| Loss | 25–18 | Apr 1990 | Barcelona, Spain | Clay | (Spain) Emilio Sánchez | (Ecuador) Andrés Gómez (Spain) Javier Sánchez | 6–7, 5–7 |
| Win | 26–18 | May 1990 | Rome, Italy | Clay | (Spain) Emilio Sánchez | (United States) Jim Courier (United States) Martin Davis | 7–6, 7–5 |
| Win | 27–18 | Jun 1990 | French Open, Paris | Clay | (Spain) Emilio Sánchez | (Socialist Federal Republic of Yugoslavia) Goran Ivanišević (Czechoslovakia) Petr Korda | 7–5, 6–3 |
| Win | 28–18 | Jul 1990 | Gstaad, Switzerland | Clay | (Spain) Emilio Sánchez | (Italy) Omar Camporese (Spain) Javier Sánchez | 6–3, 3–6, 7–5 |
| Win | 29–18 | Jul 1990 | Hilversum, Netherlands | Clay | (Spain) Emilio Sánchez | (Netherlands) Paul Haarhuis (Netherlands) Mark Koevermans | 7–5, 7–5 |
| Win | 30–18 | Oct 1990 | Palermo, Italy | Clay | (Spain) Emilio Sánchez | (Spain) Carlos Costa (Argentina) Horacio de la Peña | 6–3, 6–4 |
| Win | 31–18 | Oct 1990 | Athens, Greece | Clay | (Spain) Javier Sánchez Vicario | (Netherlands) Tom Kempers (Netherlands) Richard Krajicek | 4–6, 7–6, 6–3 |
| Loss | 31–19 | Nov 1990 | Tennis Masters Cup, Australia | Hard | (Spain) Emilio Sánchez | (France) Guy Forget (Switzerland) Jakob Hlasek | 4–6, 6–7, 7–5, 4–6 |
| Win | 32–19 | Jan 1991 | Auckland, New Zealand | Hard | (Spain) Emilio Sánchez | (Canada) Grant Connell (Canada) Glenn Michibata | 4–6, 6–3, 6–4 |
| Win | 33–19 | Feb 1991 | Stuttgart Indoor, Germany | Carpet | (Spain) Emilio Sánchez | (United Kingdom) Jeremy Bates (United Kingdom) Nick Brown | 6–3, 7–5 |
| Win | 34–19 | May 1991 | Hamburg, Germany | Clay | (Spain) Emilio Sánchez | (Brazil) Cássio Motta (South Africa) Danie Visser | 4–6, 6–3, 6–2 |
| Win | 35–19 | Nov 1991 | Buzios, Brazil | Hard | (Spain) Emilio Sánchez | (Argentina) Javier Frana (Mexico) Leonardo Lavalle | 4–6, 6–3, 6–4 |
| Win | 36–19 | Jan 1992 | Sydney Outdoor, Australia | Hard | (Spain) Emilio Sánchez | (United States) Scott Davis (United States) Kelly Jones | 3–6, 6–1, 6–4 |
| Loss | 36–20 | Feb 1992 | Milan, Italy | Carpet | (Spain) Emilio Sánchez | (United Kingdom) Neil Broad (Australia) David Macpherson | 7–5, 5–7, 4–6 |
| Win | 37–20 | May 1992 | Hamburg, Germany | Clay | (Spain) Emilio Sánchez | (Germany) Carl-Uwe Steeb (Germany) Michael Stich | 5–7, 6–4, 6–3 |
| Win | 38–20 | Jul 1992 | Kitzbühel, Austria | Clay | (Spain) Emilio Sánchez | (Argentina) Horacio de la Peña (Czechoslovakia) Vojtěch Flégl | 6–1, 6–2 |
| Loss | 38–21 | Aug 1992 | Schenectady, United States | Hard | (Spain) Emilio Sánchez | (Netherlands) Jacco Eltingh (Netherlands) Paul Haarhuis | 3–6, 4–6 |
| Win | 39–21 | Sep 1992 | Bordeaux, France | Clay | (Spain) Emilio Sánchez | (France) Arnaud Boetsch (France) Guy Forget | 6–1, 6–4 |
| Loss | 39–22 | Apr 1993 | Barcelona, Spain | Clay | (Spain) Emilio Sánchez | (United States) Shelby Cannon (United States) Scott Melville | 6–7, 1–6 |
| Win | 40–22 | Jun 1993 | Genova, Italy | Clay | (Spain) Emilio Sánchez | (Netherlands) Mark Koevermans (United States) Greg Van Emburgh | 6–3, 7–6 |
| Win | 41–22 | Oct 1993 | Palermo, Italy | Clay | (Spain) Emilio Sánchez | (Argentina) Juan Garat (Mexico) Jorge Lozano | 6–3, 6–3 |
| Win | 42–22 | Oct 1993 | Tel Aviv, Israel | Hard | (Spain) Emilio Sánchez | (United States) Mike Bauer (Czech Republic) David Rikl | 6–4, 6–4 |
| Win | 43–22 | Nov 1993 | São Paulo, Brazil | Clay | (Spain) Emilio Sánchez | (Argentina) Pablo Albano (Argentina) Javier Frana | 4–6, 7–6, 6–4 |
| Loss | 43–23 | Nov 1993 | Buenos Aires, Argentina | Clay | (Spain) Emilio Sánchez | (Spain) Tomás Carbonell (Spain) Carlos Costa | 4–6, 4–6 |
| Win | 44–23 | Jul 1994 | Gstaad, Switzerland | Clay | (Spain) Emilio Sánchez | (Netherlands) Menno Oosting (Czech Republic) Daniel Vacek | 7–6, 6–4 |
| Loss | 44–24 | Aug 1994 | Kitzbühel, Austria | Clay | (Spain) Emilio Sánchez | (South Africa) David Adams (Russia) Andrei Olhovskiy | 7–6, 3–6, 5–7 |
| Loss | 44–25 | Nov 1994 | Montevideo, Uruguay | Clay | (Spain) Emilio Sánchez | (Uruguay) Marcelo Filippini (Brazil) Luiz Mattar | 6–7, 4–6 |
| Win | 45–25 | Nov 1994 | Buenos Aires, Argentina | Clay | (Spain) Emilio Sánchez | (Spain) Tomás Carbonell (Spain) Francisco Roig | 6–3, 6–2 |
| Win | 46–25 | May 1995 | Atlanta, United States | Clay | (Spain) Emilio Sánchez | (United States) Jared Palmer (United States) Richey Reneberg | 6–7, 6–3, 7–6 |
| Loss | 46–26 | May 1995 | Coral Springs, United States | Clay | (Spain) Emilio Sánchez | (Australia) Todd Woodbridge (Australia) Mark Woodforde | 3–6, 1–6 |
| Win | 47–26 | Nov 1995 | Montevideo, Uruguay | Clay | (Spain) Emilio Sánchez | (Czech Republic) Jiří Novák (Czech Republic) David Rikl | 2–6, 7–6, 7–6 |

== Doubles performance timeline ==
Key
| W | F | SF | QF | #R | RR | Q# | DNQ | A | NH |

(W) winner; (F) finalist; (SF) semifinalist; (QF) quarterfinalist; (#R) rounds 4, 3, 2, 1; (RR) round-robin stage; (Q#) qualification round; (DNQ) did not qualify; (A) absent; (NH) not held; (SR) strike rate (events won / competed); (W–L) win–loss record.

| Tournament | 1982 | 1983 | 1984 | 1985 | 1986 | 1987 | 1988 | 1989 | 1990 | 1991 | 1992 | 1993 | 1994 | 1995 | 1996 | 1997 | Career SR | Career win–loss |
|---|---|---|---|---|---|---|---|---|---|---|---|---|---|---|---|---|---|---|
Grand Slam tournaments
| Australian Open | A | A | A | A | NH | A | A | A | 2R | 1R | 2R | 2R | 2R | A | A | A | 0 / 5 | 4–5 |
| French Open | 1R | 3R | 1R | 1R | QF | 2R | A | QF | W | 3R | 1R | QF | QF | 2R | A | A | 1 / 13 | 24–12 |
| Wimbledon | A | 2R | A | 1R | QF | F | 2R | A | A | A | 1R | 1R | 1R | A | A | A | 0 / 8 | 10–8 |
| US Open | A | A | A | A | 1R | SF | W | 2R | 2R | A | QF | 1R | 2R | SF | A | A | 1 / 9 | 19–8 |
| Grand Slam SR | 0 / 1 | 0 / 2 | 0 / 1 | 0 / 2 | 0 / 3 | 0 / 3 | 1 / 2 | 0 / 2 | 1 / 3 | 0 / 2 | 0 / 4 | 0 / 4 | 0 / 4 | 0 / 2 | 0 / 0 | 0 / 0 | 2 / 35 | N/A |
| Annual win–loss | 0–1 | 3–2 | 0–1 | 0–2 | 6–3 | 10–3 | 6–1 | 4–2 | 8–2 | 2–2 | 4–4 | 4–4 | 5–4 | 5–2 | 0–0 | 0–0 | N/A | 57–33 |
ATP Masters Series
| Indian Wells | These Tournaments Were Not Masters Series Events Before 1990 | | | | | | | | 1R | 2R | 2R | 2R | 1R | 1R | A | A | 0 / 6 | 2–6 |
| Miami | These Tournaments Were Not Masters Series Events Before 1990 | | | | | | | | QF | QF | 2R | 3R | 2R | 2R | A | A | 0 / 6 | 6–6 |
| Monte Carlo | These Tournaments Were Not Masters Series Events Before 1990 | | | | | | | | 2R | SF | 2R | SF | SF | 2R | A | A | 0 / 6 | 9–6 |
| Rome | These Tournaments Were Not Masters Series Events Before 1990 | | | | | | | | W | QF | 1R | 2R | 1R | A | A | A | 1 / 5 | 8–4 |
| Hamburg | These Tournaments Were Not Masters Series Events Before 1990 | | | | | | | | A | W | W | SF | 2R | A | A | A | 2 / 4 | 13–2 |
| Canada | These Tournaments Were Not Masters Series Events Before 1990 | | | | | | | | A | A | A | A | A | A | A | A | 0 / 0 | 0–0 |
| Cincinnati | These Tournaments Were Not Masters Series Events Before 1990 | | | | | | | | A | A | A | A | A | A | A | A | 0 / 0 | 0–0 |
| Stuttgart (Stockholm) | These Tournaments Were Not Masters Series Events Before 1990 | | | | | | | | 2R | A | A | A | A | A | A | A | 0 / 1 | 0–1 |
| Paris | These Tournaments Were Not Masters Series Events Before 1990 | | | | | | | | 2R | A | 2R | A | A | A | A | A | 0 / 2 | 0–2 |
| Masters Series SR | N/A | | | | | | | | 1 / 6 | 1 / 5 | 1 / 6 | 0 / 5 | 0 / 5 | 0 / 3 | 0 / 0 | 0 / 0 | 3 / 30 | N/A |
| Annual win–loss | N/A | | | | | | | | 8–5 | 10–4 | 6–5 | 9–5 | 4–5 | 1–3 | 0–0 | 0–0 | N/A | 38–27 |
| Year-end ranking | 159 | 73 | 169 | 25 | 27 | 7 | 10 | 53 | 13 | 20 | 21 | 22 | 34 | 35 | – | 742 | N/A | |
