= Rick Leach =

American tennis player and coach

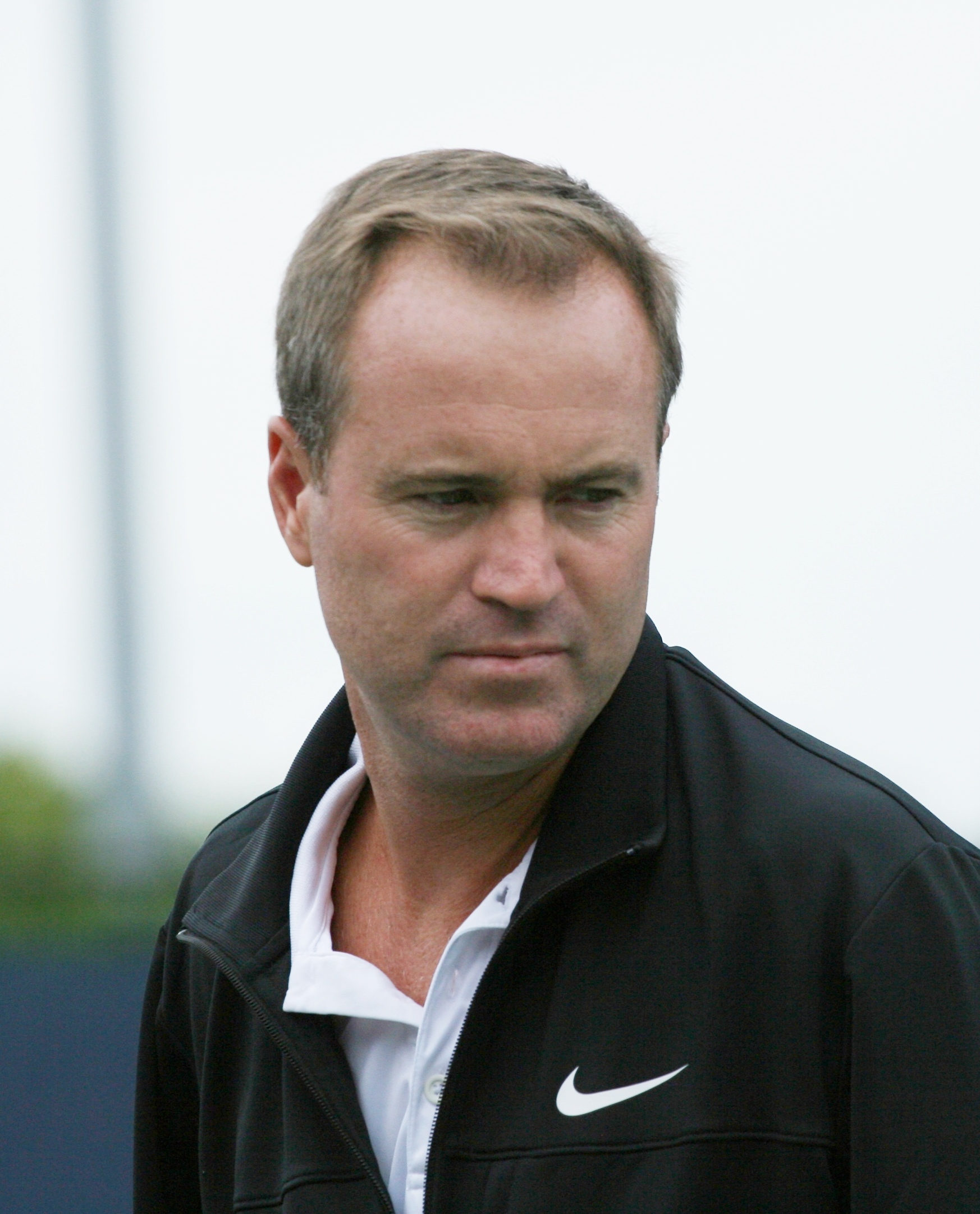
- Country (sports): United States
- Residence: Laguna Beach, California, U.S.
- Born: December 28, 1964 (age 61) Arcadia, California, U.S.
- Height: 1.88 m (6 ft 2 in)
- Turned pro: 1987
- Retired: 2011
- Plays: Left-handed (two-handed backhand)
- Prize money: $4,293,554

Singles
- Career record: 21–58
- Career titles: 0
- Highest ranking: No. 56 (September 28, 1987)

Grand Slam singles results
- Australian Open: 2R (1988)
- Wimbledon: 1R (1990, 1992)
- US Open: 2R (1987, 1988, 1989, 1990)

Doubles
- Career record: 648–390
- Career titles: 46
- Highest ranking: No. 1 (March 26, 1990)

Grand Slam doubles results
- Australian Open: W (1988, 1989, 2000)
- French Open: F (1991)
- Wimbledon: W (1990)
- US Open: W (1993)
Medal record
Representing United States
Summer Universiade
Silver medal – second place	1985 Kobe	Men's doubles

Rick Leach (born December 28, 1964) is a tennis coach and former professional player from the United States. A doubles specialist, he won five Grand Slam doubles titles (three at the Australian Open, one at Wimbledon, and one at the US Open), and four mixed doubles titles (two at the Australian Open, one at Wimbledon, and one at the US Open). He reached the world No. 1 doubles ranking in 1990.

Leach was a member of the US team which won the Davis Cup in 1990. Partnering Jim Pugh, he won the doubles rubbers in all four of the rounds which the US played in that year, and clinched the team's victory in the final with a win over Pat Cash and John Fitzgerald of Australia.

Prior to turning professional, Leach became the first four-time Division 1 All-American in singles and doubles at the University of Southern California (where he played for his father Dick), and won the NCAA doubles title in 1986 and 1987.

== Coaching career ==
He was the coach of the Orange County Breakers. Since January 2026, he is coaching Brandon Nakashima.

== Grand Slam finals ==
=== Doubles (5 titles, 7 runner-ups) ===
Result	Year	Championship	Surface	Partner	Opponents	Score
Win	1988	Australian Open	Hard	(United States) Jim Pugh	(United Kingdom) Jeremy Bates (Sweden) Peter Lundgren	6–3, 6–2, 6–3
Loss	1988	US Open	Hard	(United States) Jim Pugh	(Spain) Sergio Casal (Spain) Emilio Sánchez	w/o
Win	1989	Australian Open (2)	Hard	(United States) Jim Pugh	(Australia) Darren Cahill (Australia) Mark Kratzmann	6–4, 6–4, 6–4
Loss	1989	Wimbledon	Grass	(United States) Jim Pugh	(Australia) John Fitzgerald (Sweden) Anders Järryd	6–3, 6–7^{(4–7)}, 4–6, 6–7^{(4–7)}
Win	1990	Wimbledon	Grass	(United States) Jim Pugh	(South Africa) Pieter Aldrich (South Africa) Danie Visser	7–6^{(7–5)}, 7–6^{(7–4)}, 7–6^{(7–5)}
Loss	1991	French Open	Clay	(United States) Jim Pugh	(Australia) John Fitzgerald (Sweden) Anders Järryd	0–6, 5–7
Loss	1992	Australian Open	Hard	(United States) Kelly Jones	(Australia) Todd Woodbridge (Australia) Mark Woodforde	4–6, 3–6, 4–6
Loss	1992	U.S. Open	Hard	(United States) Kelly Jones	(United States) Jim Grabb (United States) Richey Reneberg	6–3, 6–7^{(2–7)}, 3–6, 3–6
Win	1993	US Open	Hard	(United States) Ken Flach	(Czechoslovakia) Martin Damm (Czechoslovakia) Karel Nováček	6–7^{(3–7)}, 6–4, 6–2
Loss	1995	Wimbledon	Grass	(United States) Scott Melville	(Australia) Todd Woodbridge (Australia) Mark Woodforde	5–7, 6–7^{(8–10)}, 6–7^{(5–7)}
Win	2000	Australian Open (3)	Hard	(South Africa) Ellis Ferreira	(Zimbabwe) Wayne Black (Australia) Andrew Kratzmann	6–4, 3–6, 6–3, 3–6, 18–16
Loss	2000	U.S. Open	Hard	(South Africa) Ellis Ferreira	(Australia) Lleyton Hewitt (Belarus) Max Mirnyi	4–6, 7–5, 6–7^{(5–7)}

=== Mixed doubles (4 titles, 5 runner-ups) ===
Result	Year	Championship	Surface	Partner	Opponents	Score
Loss	1989	US Open	Hard	(United States) Meredith McGrath	(United States) Shelby Cannon (United States) Robin White	6–3, 2–6, 5–7
Loss	1990	Australian Open	Hard	(United States) Zina Garrison	(United States) Jim Pugh (Soviet Union) Natasha Zvereva	6–4, 2–6, 3–6
Win	1990	Wimbledon	Grass	(United States) Zina Garrison Jackson	(Australia) John Fitzgerald (Australia) Elizabeth Smylie	7–5, 6–2
Loss	1993	Australian Open (2)	Hard	(United States) Zina Garrison-Jackson	(Australia) Todd Woodbridge (Spain) Arantxa Sánchez Vicario	5–7, 4–6
Win	1995	Australian Open	Hard	(Belarus) Natasha Zvereva	(United States) Gigi Fernández (Czechoslovakia) Cyril Suk	7–6, 6–7, 6–4
Loss	1996	U.S. Open (2)	Hard	(Netherlands) Manon Bollegraf	(United States) Patrick Galbraith (United States) Lisa Raymond	6–7, 6–7
Win	1997	Australian Open (2)	Hard	(Netherlands) Manon Bollegraf	(South Africa) John-Laffnie de Jager (Latvia) Larisa Savchenko Neiland	6–3, 6–7, 7–5
Win	1997	US Open	Hard	(Netherlands) Manon Bollegraf	(Argentina) Mercedes Paz (Argentina) Pablo Albano	3–6, 7–5, 6–3
Loss	1999	French Open (2)	Clay	(Latvia) Larisa Savchenko Neiland	(South Africa) Piet Norval (Slovenia) Katarina Srebotnik	3–6, 6–3, 3–6

== Career finals ==
=== Doubles (46 wins, 36 losses) ===
Legend Grand Slam (5) Tennis Masters Cup (3) ATP Masters Series (4) ATP Championship Series (8) ATP Tour (28)	Titles by surface Hard (28) Clay (6) Grass (4) Carpet (8)

Result	W–L	Date	Tournament	Surface	Partner	Opponents	Score
Loss	0–1	Jun 1987	London/Queen's Club, UK	Grass	(United States) Tim Pawsat	(France) Guy Forget (France) Yannick Noah	4–6, 4–6
Win	1–1	Jul 1987	Stuttgart Outdoor, Germany	Clay	(United States) Tim Pawsat	(Sweden) Mikael Pernfors (Sweden) Magnus Tideman	6–3, 6–4
Win	2–1	Oct 1987	Scottsdale, U.S.	Hard	(United States) Jim Pugh	(United States) Dan Goldie (United States) Mel Purcell	6–3, 6–2
Win	3–1	Jan 1988	Wellington, New Zealand	Hard	(United States) Dan Goldie	(Australia) Broderick Dyke (Canada) Glenn Michibata	6–2, 6–3
Win	4–1	Jan 1988	Australian Open, Melbourne	Hard	(United States) Jim Pugh	(United Kingdom) Jeremy Bates (Sweden) Peter Lundgren	6–3, 6–2, 6–3
Loss	4–2	May 1988	Hamburg, Germany	Clay	(United States) Jim Pugh	(Australia) Darren Cahill (Australia) Laurie Warder	4–6, 4–6
Win	5–2	May 1988	Munich, Germany	Clay	(United States) Jim Pugh	(Argentina) Alberto Mancini (Argentina) Christian Miniussi	7–6, 6–1
Win	6–2	Jul 1988	Washington, D.C., U.S.	Hard	(United States) Jim Pugh	(Mexico) Jorge Lozano (United States) Todd Witsken	6–3, 6–7, 6–2
Win	7–2	Aug 1988	Indianapolis, U.S.	Hard	(United States) Jim Pugh	(United States) Ken Flach (United States) Robert Seguso	6–4, 6–3
Win	8–2	Aug 1988	Cincinnati, U.S.	Hard	(United States) Jim Pugh	(United States) Jim Grabb (United States) Patrick McEnroe	6–2, 6–4
Loss	8–3	Sep 1988	US Open, New York	Hard	(United States) Jim Pugh	(Spain) Sergio Casal (Spain) Emilio Sánchez	W/O
Loss	8–4	Oct 1988	Scottsdale, U.S.	Hard	(United States) Jim Pugh	(United States) Scott Davis (United States) Tim Wilkison	4–6, 6–7
Win	9–4	Nov 1988	Detroit, U.S.	Carpet	(United States) Jim Pugh	(United States) Ken Flach (United States) Robert Seguso	6–4, 6–1
Win	10–4	Dec 1988	Masters Doubles, London	Carpet	(United States) Jim Pugh	(Spain) Emilio Sánchez (Spain) Sergio Casal	6–4, 6–3, 2–6, 6–0
Win	11–4	Jan 1989	Australian Open, Melbourne	Hard	(United States) Jim Pugh	(Australia) Darren Cahill (Australia) Mark Kratzmann	6–4, 6–4, 6–4
Loss	11–5	Feb 1989	Philadelphia, U.S.	Carpet	(United States) Jim Pugh	(United States) Paul Annacone (South Africa) Christo van Rensburg	3–6, 5–7
Win	12–5	Mar 1989	Scottsdale, U.S.	Hard	(United States) Jim Pugh	(United States) Paul Annacone (South Africa) Christo van Rensburg	6–7, 6–3, 6–2, 2–6, 6–4
Win	13–5	May 1989	Singapore	Hard	(United States) Jim Pugh	(United States) Paul Chamberlin (Kenya) Paul Wekesa	6–3, 6–4
Win	14–5	May 1989	Forest Hills, U.S.	Clay	(United States) Jim Pugh	(United States) Jim Courier (United States) Pete Sampras	6–4, 6–2
Loss	14–6	Jul 1989	Wimbledon, London	Grass	(United States) Jim Pugh	(Australia) John Fitzgerald (Sweden) Anders Järryd	6–3, 6–7, 4–6, 6–7
Loss	14–7	Nov 1989	Stockholm, Sweden	Carpet	(United States) Jim Pugh	(Mexico) Jorge Lozano (United States) Todd Witsken	3–6, 7–5, 3–6
Win	15–7	Nov 1989	Itaparica, Brazil	Hard	(United States) Jim Pugh	(Mexico) Jorge Lozano (United States) Todd Witsken	6–2, 7–6
Win	16–7	Feb 1990	Philadelphia, U.S.	Carpet	(United States) Jim Pugh	(Canada) Grant Connell (Canada) Glenn Michibata	3–6, 6–4, 6–2
Win	17–7	Mar 1990	Miami, U.S.	Hard	(United States) Jim Pugh	(Germany) Boris Becker (Brazil) Cássio Motta	6–4, 3–6, 6–3
Win	18–7	Jul 1990	Wimbledon, London	Grass	(United States) Jim Pugh	(United States) Pieter Aldrich (South Africa) Danie Visser	7–6, 7–6, 7–6
Loss	18–8	Nov 1990	Wembley, England	Carpet	(United States) Jim Pugh	(United States) Jim Grabb (United States) Patrick McEnroe	6–7, 6–4, 3–6
Win	19–8	Feb 1991	Philadelphia, U.S.	Carpet	(United States) Jim Pugh	(Germany) Udo Riglewski (Germany) Michael Stich	6–4, 6–4
Win	20–8	May 1991	Charlotte, U.S.	Clay	(United States) Jim Pugh	(United States) Bret Garnett (United States) Greg Van Emburgh	6–3, 2–6, 6–3
Loss	20–9	Jun 1991	French Open, Paris	Clay	(United States) Jim Pugh	(Australia) John Fitzgerald (Sweden) Anders Järryd	0–6, 6–7
Loss	20–10	Nov 1991	Paris, France	Carpet	(United States) Kelly Jones	(Australia) John Fitzgerald (Sweden) Anders Järryd	6–3, 3–6, 2–6
Loss	20–11	Jan 1992	Australian Open, Melbourne	Hard	(United States) Kelly Jones	(Australia) Todd Woodbridge (Australia) Mark Woodforde	4–6, 3–6, 4–6
Win	21–11	Apr 1992	Tokyo Outdoor, Japan	Hard	(United States) Kelly Jones	(Australia) John Fitzgerald (Sweden) Anders Järryd	0–6, 7–5, 6–3
Win	22–11	Aug 1992	New Haven, U.S.	Hard	(United States) Kelly Jones	(United States) Patrick McEnroe (United States) Jared Palmer	7–6, 6–7, 6–2
Loss	22–12	Sep 1992	US Open, New York	Hard	(United States) Kelly Jones	(United States) Jim Grabb (United States) Richey Reneberg	6–3, 6–7, 3–6, 3–6
Win	23–12	Apr 1993	Tokyo Outdoor, Japan	Hard	(United States) Ken Flach	(Canada) Glenn Michibata (United States) David Pate	2–6, 6–3, 6–4
Win	24–12	Jun 1993	Manchester, England	Grass	(United States) Ken Flach	(South Africa) Stefan Kruger (Canada) Glenn Michibata	6–4, 6–1
Win	25–12	Jul 1993	Washington, D.C., U.S.	Hard	(Zimbabwe) Byron Black	(Canada) Grant Connell (United States) Patrick Galbraith	6–4, 7–5
Loss	25–13	Aug, 1993	Indianapolis, U.S.	Hard	(United States) Ken Flach	(United States) Scott Davis (United States) Todd Martin	4–6, 4–6
Win	26–13	Sep 1993	US Open, New York	Hard	(United States) Ken Flach	(Czech Republic) Martin Damm (Czech Republic) Karel Nováček	6–7, 6–4, 6–2
Win	27–13	Feb 1994	San Jose, U.S.	Hard (i)	(United States) Jared Palmer	(Zimbabwe) Byron Black (United States) Jonathan Stark	4–6, 6–4, 6–4
Win	28–13	Jun 1994	Manchester, England	Grass	(South Africa) Danie Visser	(United States) Scott Davis (United States) Trevor Kronemann	6–4, 4–6, 7–6
Loss	28–14	Jul 1995	Wimbledon, London	Grass	(United States) Scott Melville	(Australia) Todd Woodbridge (Australia) Mark Woodforde	5–7, 6–7, 6–7
Win	29–14	Aug 1995	New Haven, U.S.	Hard	(United States) Scott Melville	(India) Leander Paes (Venezuela) Nicolás Pereira	7–6, 6–4
Loss	29–15	Aug 1995	Long Island, U.S.	Hard	(United States) Scott Melville	(Czech Republic) Cyril Suk (Czech Republic) Daniel Vacek	7–5, 6–7, 6–7
Win	30–15	Jan 1996	Jakarta, Indonesia	Hard	(United States) Scott Melville	(United States) Kent Kinnear (United States) Dave Randall	6–1, 2–6, 6–1
Win	31–15	Mar 1996	Scottsdale, U.S.	Hard	(United States) Patrick Galbraith	(United States) Richey Reneberg (New Zealand) Brett Steven	5–7, 7–5, 7–5
Loss	31–16	Apr 1996	Tokyo, Japan	Hard	(The Bahamas) Mark Knowles	(Australia) Todd Woodbridge (Australia) Mark Woodforde	2–6, 3–6
Win	32–16	Apr 1996	Seoul, South Korea	Hard	(United States) Jonathan Stark	(United States) Kent Kinnear (Zimbabwe) Kevin Ullyett	6–4, 6–4
Win	33–16	Nov 1996	Moscow, Russia	Carpet	(Russia) Andrei Olhovskiy	(Czech Republic) Jiří Novák (Czech Republic) David Rikl	4–6, 6–1, 6–2
Loss	33–17	Jan 1997	Auckland, New Zealand	Hard	(United States) Jonathan Stark	(South Africa) Ellis Ferreira (United States) Patrick Galbraith	4–6, 6–4, 6–7
Loss	33–18	Feb 1997	Memphis, U.S.	Hard (i)	(United States) Jonathan Stark	(South Africa) Ellis Ferreira (United States) Patrick Galbraith	3–6, 6–3, 1–6
Loss	33–19	Mar 1997	Scottsdale, U.S.	Hard	(Sweden) Jonas Björkman	(Argentina) Luis Lobo (Spain) Javier Sánchez	3–6, 3–6
Loss	33–20	Jul 1997	Los Angeles, U.S.	Hard	(India) Mahesh Bhupathi	(Canada) Sébastien Lareau (United States) Alex O'Brien	6–7, 4–6
Loss	33–21	Oct 1997	Singapore	Carpet	(United States) Jonathan Stark	(India) Mahesh Bhupathi (India) Leander Paes	4–6, 4–6
Loss	33–22	Oct 1997	Stuttgart Indoor, Germany	Carpet	(United States) Jonathan Stark	(Australia) Todd Woodbridge (Australia) Mark Woodforde	3–6, 3–6
Loss	33–23	Nov 1997	Paris, France	Carpet	(United States) Jonathan Stark	(Netherlands) Jacco Eltingh (Netherlands) Paul Haarhuis	2–6, 6–7
Win	34–23	Nov 1997	Doubles Championships, Hartford	Carpet	(United States) Jonathan Stark	(India) Mahesh Bhupathi (India) Leander Paes	6–3, 6–4, 7–6
Loss	34–24	Jan 1998	Adelaide, Australia	Hard	(South Africa) Ellis Ferreira	(Australia) Joshua Eagle (Australia) Andrew Florent	4–6, 7–6, 3–6
Win	35–24	Mar 1998	Miami, U.S.	Hard	(South Africa) Ellis Ferreira	(United States) Alex O'Brien (United States) Jonathan Stark	6–2, 6–4
Loss	35–25	Apr 1998	Barcelona, Spain	Clay	(South Africa) Ellis Ferreira	(Netherlands) Jacco Eltingh (Netherlands) Paul Haarhuis	5–7, 0–6
Loss	35–26	May 1998	Rome, Italy	Clay	(South Africa) Ellis Ferreira	(India) Mahesh Bhupathi (India) Leander Paes	4–6, 6–4, 6–7
Win	36–26	Jun 1998	Halle, Germany	Grass	(South Africa) Ellis Ferreira	(South Africa) John-Laffnie de Jager (Germany) Marc-Kevin Goellner	4–6, 6–4, 7–6
Loss	36–27	Aug 1998	Toronto, Canada	Hard	(South Africa) Ellis Ferreira	(Czech Republic) Martin Damm (United States) Jim Grabb	7–6, 2–6, 6–7
Loss	36–28	Mar 1999	Indian Wells, U.S.	Hard	(South Africa) Ellis Ferreira	(Zimbabwe) Wayne Black (Australia) Sandon Stolle	6–7, 3–6
Win	37–28	May 1999	Rome, Italy	Clay	(South Africa) Ellis Ferreira	(South Africa) David Adams (South Africa) John-Laffnie de Jager	6–7, 6–1, 6–2
Win	38–28	Jan 2000	Auckland, New Zealand	Hard	(South Africa) Ellis Ferreira	(France) Olivier Delaître (United States) Jeff Tarango	7–5, 6–4
Win	39–28	Jan 2000	Australian Open, Australia	Hard	(South Africa) Ellis Ferreira	(Zimbabwe) Wayne Black (Australia) Andrew Kratzmann	6–4, 3–6, 6–3, 3–6, 18–16
Win	40–28	Apr 2000	Atlanta, U.S.	Clay	(South Africa) Ellis Ferreira	(United States) Justin Gimelstob (The Bahamas) Mark Knowles	6–3, 6–4
Loss	40–29	Jun 2000	Nottingham, England	Grass	(South Africa) Ellis Ferreira	(United States) Donald Johnson (South Africa) Piet Norval	6–1, 4–6, 3–6
Loss	40–30	Aug 2000	Cincinnati, U.S.	Hard	(South Africa) Ellis Ferreira	(Australia) Todd Woodbridge (Australia) Mark Woodforde	6–7, 4–6
Loss	40–31	Sept 2000	US Open, New York	Hard	(South Africa) Ellis Ferreira	(Australia) Lleyton Hewitt (Belarus) Max Mirnyi	4–6, 7–5, 6–7
Loss	40–32	Apr 2001	Atlanta, U.S.	Clay	(Australia) David Macpherson	(India) Mahesh Bhupathi (India) Leander Paes	3–6, 6–7
Win	41–32	Oct 2001	Tokyo, Japan	Hard	(Australia) David Macpherson	(Australia) Paul Hanley (Australia) Nathan Healey	1–6, 7–6, 7–6
Win	42–32	Oct 2001	Basel, Switzerland	Carpet	(South Africa) Ellis Ferreira	(India) Mahesh Bhupathi (India) Leander Paes	7–6, 6–4
Win	43–32	Nov 2001	Paris, France	Carpet	(South Africa) Ellis Ferreira	(India) Mahesh Bhupathi (India) Leander Paes	3–6, 6–4, 6–3
Win	44–32	Feb 2002	ATP Doubles Challenge Cup, Bangalore	Hard	(South Africa) Ellis Ferreira	(Czech Republic) Petr Pála (Czech Republic) Pavel Vízner	6–7^{(6)}, 7–6^{(2)}, 6–4, 6–4
Loss	44–33	Feb 2004	San Jose, U.S.	Hard (i)	(United States) Brian MacPhie	(United States) James Blake (United States) Mardy Fish	2–6, 5–7
Win	45–33	Mar 2004	Scottsdale, U.S.	Hard	(United States) Brian MacPhie	(South Africa) Jeff Coetzee (South Africa) Chris Haggard	6–3, 6–1
Loss	45–34	Apr 2004	Houston, U.S.	Clay	(United States) Brian MacPhie	(United States) |James Blake (United States) Mardy Fish	3–6, 4–6
Loss	45–35	Jun 2004	Nottingham, England	Grass	(United States) Brian MacPhie	(Australia) Paul Hanley (Australia) Todd Woodbridge	4–6, 3–6
Loss	45–36	Oct 2004	Shanghai, China	Hard	(United States) Brian MacPhie	(United States) Jared Palmer (Czech Republic) Pavel Vízner	6–4, 6–7, 6–7
Win	46–36	Aug 2005	Los Angeles, U.S.	Hard	(United States) Brian MacPhie	(Israel) Jonathan Erlich (Israel) Andy Ram	6–3, 6–4

== Doubles performance timeline ==
Key
W	F	SF	QF	#R	RR	Q#	DNQ	A	NH

(W) winner; (F) finalist; (SF) semifinalist; (QF) quarterfinalist; (#R) rounds 4, 3, 2, 1; (RR) round-robin stage; (Q#) qualification round; (DNQ) did not qualify; (A) absent; (NH) not held; (SR) strike rate (events won / competed); (W–L) win–loss record.

Tournament	1982	1983	1984	1985	1986	1987	1988	1989	1990	1991	1992	1993	1994	1995	1996	1997	1998	1999	2000	2001	2002	2003	2004	2005	2006	SR	W–L
Grand Slam tournaments
Australian Open	A	A	A	A	NH	A	W	W	SF	3R	F	2R	QF	QF	QF	SF	QF	SF	W	A	QF	A	2R	2R	A	3 / 16	55–13
French Open	A	A	A	A	A	A	QF	1R	3R	F	1R	2R	1R	3R	QF	QF	1R	QF	1R	3R	2R	2R	2R	1R	A	0 / 18	27–18
Wimbledon	A	A	A	A	1R	2R	3R	F	W	1R	3R	2R	2R	F	1R	3R	QF	2R	QF	QF	2R	2R	3R	2R	A	1 / 20	40–19
US Open	1R	A	A	A	2R	1R	F	QF	1R	2R	F	W	2R	QF	1R	1R	1R	2R	F	QF	3R	2R	1R	1R	A	1 / 21	37–19
Annual win–loss	0–1	0–0	0–0	0–0	1–2	1–2	16–2	14–3	12–3	8–4	12–4	9–3	5–4	13–4	6–4	9–4	6–4	9–4	14–3	8–3	7–4	3–3	4–4	2–4	0–0	N/A	159–69
ATP Masters Series
Indian Wells	These Tournaments Were Not Masters Series Events Before 1990								SF	2R	1R	1R	2R	1R	1R	QF	2R	F	QF	1R	1R	A	1R	A	A	0 / 14	9–14
Miami	These Tournaments Were Not Masters Series Events Before 1990								W	3R	2R	2R	3R	3R	3R	QF	W	3R	3R	QF	2R	2R	1R	A	A	2 / 15	22–13
Monte Carlo	These Tournaments Were Not Masters Series Events Before 1990								A	A	A	A	A	1R	A	A	2R	2R	QF	A	1R	A	A	A	A	0 / 5	3–4
Rome	These Tournaments Were Not Masters Series Events Before 1990								1R	A	1R	A	A	QF	A	SF	F	W	2R	A	QF	A	A	A	A	1 / 8	17–7
Hamburg	These Tournaments Were Not Masters Series Events Before 1990								A	A	2R	A	A	2R	A	A	SF	SF	1R	A	1R	A	A	A	A	0 / 6	5–6
Canada	These Tournaments Were Not Masters Series Events Before 1990								A	A	SF	2R	A	1R	A	2R	F	SF	QF	QF	1R	A	A	A	A	0 / 9	13–9
Cincinnati	These Tournaments Were Not Masters Series Events Before 1990								SF	QF	2R	2R	1R	1R	SF	1R	2R	2R	F	2R	1R	A	A	2R	A	0 / 14	15–14
Madrid (Stuttgart)	These Tournaments Were Not Masters Series Events Before 1990								A	QF	QF	2R	A	2R	1R	F	2R	2R	QF	A	QF	A	A	A	A	0 / 10	9–10
Paris	These Tournaments Were Not Masters Series Events Before 1990								2R	F	2R	2R	A	2R	1R	F	2R	SF	2R	W	QF	A	A	A	A	1 / 12	16–11
Masters Series SR	N/A								1 / 5	0 / 5	0 / 8	0 / 6	0 / 3	0 / 9	0 / 5	0 / 7	1 / 9	1 / 9	0 / 9	1 / 5	0 / 9	0 / 1	0 / 2	0 / 1	0 / 0	4 / 93	N/A
Annual win–loss	N/A								8–4	9–5	3–8	1–6	1–3	5–9	4–5	14–7	15–7	18–8	13–9	10–4	6–9	1–1	0–2	1–1	0–0	N/A	109–89
Year-end ranking	791	–	616	313	102	45	7	4	5	14	6	15	52	19	20	8	13	15	6	20	36	95	48	77	640	N/A	
