= Brian Page =

American tennis player

- Full name: Brian Page Senior
- Country (sports): United States
- Born: May 8, 1966 (age 58); Minneapolis–Saint Paul, Minnesota, U.S.
- Turned pro: 1988

Singles
- Career record: 2–3
- Career titles: 0
- Highest ranking: No. 352 (June 12, 1989)

Doubles
- Career record: 12–18
- Career titles: 0
- Highest ranking: No. 113 (June 18, 1990)

Grand Slam doubles results
- Australian Open: 1R (1990, 1991)
- French Open: 2R (1990)
- Wimbledon: 1R (1989, 1990)
- US Open: 1R (1990)

Brian Page Senior (born 8 May 1966) is a former professional tennis player from the United States.

== Biography ==
Born in Minnesota, Page later moved to Chicago and attended Marist High School. From 1985 to 1988 he went to Clemson University where he earned multiple All-ACC selections while on the varsity tennis team. He won the United States Amateur Championships in 1987.

Page, who turned professional in 1988, won a doubles title in 1989 at a Challenger event in Jakarta. He was a doubles finalist at the 1990 Prudential-Bache Securities Classic in Orlando, a tournament on the ATP Tour, with Alfonso Mora as his partner. They lost the final to Scott Davis and David Pate. During his career he competed in the men's doubles draws of all four Grand Slam tournaments. He made the second round once, at the 1990 French Open.

Since 1992 he has been the Director of Tennis at Ruth Lake Country Club in Hinsdale, Illinois.

His son, Brian Page Jr, competes on the ITF Futures and ATP Challenger circuits.

== ATP Tour career finals ==
=== Doubles: 1 (0–1) ===
Result	W/L	Year	Tournament	Surface	Partner	Opponents	Score
Loss	0–1	1990	Orlando, U.S.	Hard	(Venezuela) Alfonso Mora	(United States) Scott Davis (United States) David Pate	3–6, 5–7

== Challenger titles ==
=== Doubles: (1) ===
No.	Year	Tournament	Surface	Partner	Opponents	Score
1.	1989	Jakarta, Indonesia	Hard	(Romania) Mihnea-Ion Năstase	(Australia) Neil Borwick (Australia) Steve Furlong	3–6, 6–3, 7–6
