= Verizon Tennis Challenge =

Defunct tennis tournament
- Tour: Grand Prix circuit (1983–1989); ATP World Series (1990–1997); ATP International Series (1998–2001)
- Founded: 1984
- Abolished: 2001
- Editions: 19
- Location: Fort Myers, Florida, US (1985–1986); Orlando, Florida, US (1987–1991); Atlanta, GA, US (1992–2001)
- Surface: Hard (1985–1991); Clay (1992–2001)

The Verizon Tennis Challenge (ex Paine Webber Classic from 1984 in Boca Raton to 1987 in Orlando) was a Grand Prix tennis circuit and Association of Tennis Professionals (ATP) Tour affiliated men's tennis tournament played from 1984 to 2001. It was held in the United States, in Boca Raton, Florida in 1984, in Fort Myers, Florida in 1985 and 1986, in Orlando, Florida from 1987 to 1991, and at the Atlanta Athletic Club in what is now Johns Creek, Georgia from 1992 to 2001. The tournament was played on outdoor hard courts from 1985 to 1991 and on outdoor clay courts from 1992 to 2001.

== History ==
In 1983, the Paine Webber Classic was the last sponsored name of the first installment of the Dallas Open that initially ran from 1953 to 1971, then was discontinued. In 1983, it was revived for one edition to replace the Denver Open that season in the tour calendar.

In 1984, a new successor event the Paine Webber Classic Boca Raton was established to replace the Dallas Open (later revived in 2020), but this was held in Florida.

== Past finals ==
=== Singles ===
Location	Year	Champions	Runners-up	Score
Boca Raton; United States	1984	(United States) Jimmy Connors	(United States) Johan Kriek	7–5, 6–4
Fort Myers; United States	1985	(Czechoslovakia) Ivan Lendl	(United States) Jimmy Connors	6–3, 6–2
Fort Myers; United States	1986	(Czechoslovakia) Ivan Lendl	(United States) Jimmy Connors	6–2, 6–0
Orlando; United States	1987	(South Africa) Christo van Rensburg	(United States) Jimmy Connors	6–3, 3–6, 6–1
Orlando; United States	1988	(Soviet Union) Andrei Chesnokov	(Czechoslovakia) Miloslav Mečíř	7–6^{(8–6)}, 6–1
Orlando; United States	1989	(United States) Andre Agassi	(United States) Brad Gilbert	6–2, 6–1
Orlando; United States	1990	(United States) Brad Gilbert	(South Africa) Christo van Rensburg	6–2, 6–1
Orlando; United States	1991	(United States) Andre Agassi	(United States) Derrick Rostagno	6–2, 1–6, 6–3
Atlanta; United States	1992	(United States) Andre Agassi	(United States) Pete Sampras	7–5, 6–4
Atlanta; United States	1993	(Netherlands) Jacco Eltingh	(United States) Bryan Shelton	7–6^{(7–1)}, 6–2
Atlanta; United States	1994	(United States) Michael Chang	(United States) Todd Martin	6–7^{(4–7)}, 7–6^{(7–4)}, 6–0
Atlanta; United States	1995	(United States) Michael Chang	(United States) Andre Agassi	6–2, 6–7^{(6–8)}, 6–4
Atlanta; United States	1996	(Morocco) Karim Alami	(Sweden) Nicklas Kulti	6–3, 6–4
Atlanta; United States	1997	(Uruguay) Marcelo Filippini	(Australia) Jason Stoltenberg	7–6^{(7–2)}, 6–4
Atlanta; United States	1998	(United States) Pete Sampras	(Australia) Jason Stoltenberg	6–7^{(2–7)}, 6–3, 7–6^{(7–4)}
Atlanta; United States	1999	(Austria) Stefan Koubek	(France) Sébastien Grosjean	6–1, 6–2
Atlanta; United States	2000	(Australia) Andrew Ilie	(Australia) Jason Stoltenberg	6–3, 7–5
Atlanta; United States	2001	(United States) Andy Roddick	(Belgium) Xavier Malisse	6–2, 6–4

=== Doubles ===
Location	Year	Champions	Runners-up	Score
Fort Myers; United States	1985	(United States) Ken Flach (United States) Robert Seguso	(United States) Sammy Giammalva Jr. (United States) David Pate	3–6, 6–3, 6–3
Fort Myers; United States	1986	(Czechoslovakia) Ivan Lendl (Ecuador) Andrés Gómez	(Australia) Peter Doohan (Australia) Paul McNamee	7–5, 6–4
Orlando; United States	1987	(Australia) Kim Warwick (United States) Sherwood Stewart	(United States) Paul Annacone (South Africa) Christo van Rensburg	2–6, 7–6, 6–4
Orlando; United States	1988	(France) Guy Forget (France) Yannick Noah	(United States) Sherwood Stewart (Australia) Kim Warwick	6–4, 6–4
Orlando; United States	1989	(United States) Scott Davis (United States) Tim Pawsat	(United States) Ken Flach (United States) Robert Seguso	7–5, 5–7, 6–4
Orlando; United States	1990	(United States) Scott Davis (United States) David Pate	(Venezuela) Alfonso Mora (United States) Brian Page	6–3, 7–5
Orlando; United States	1991	(United States) Luke Jensen (United States) Scott Melville	(Venezuela) Nicolás Pereira (United States) Pete Sampras	6–7, 7–6, 6–3
Atlanta; United States	1992	(United States) Steve DeVries (Australia) David Macpherson	(United States) Dave Randall (United States) Mark Keil	6–3, 6–3
Atlanta; United States	1993	(United States) Paul Annacone (United States) Richey Reneberg	(United States) Todd Martin (United States) Jared Palmer	6–4, 7–6
Atlanta; United States	1994	(United States) Jared Palmer (United States) Richey Reneberg	(United States) Francisco Montana (United States) Jim Pugh	4–6, 7–6, 6–4
Atlanta; United States	1995	(Spain) Sergio Casal (Spain) Emilio Sánchez	(United States) Jared Palmer (United States) Richey Reneberg	6–7, 6–3, 7–6
Atlanta; United States	1996	(South Africa) Christo van Rensburg (United States) David Wheaton	(United States) Bill Behrens (United States) Matt Lucena	7–6, 6–2
Atlanta; United States	1997	(Sweden) Jonas Björkman (Sweden) Nicklas Kulti	(United States) Scott Davis (United States) Kelly Jones	6–4, 6–4
Atlanta; United States	1998	(South Africa) Ellis Ferreira (South Africa) Brent Haygarth	(United States) Alex O'Brien (United States) Richey Reneberg	6–3, 0–6, 6–2
Atlanta; United States	1999	(United States) Patrick Galbraith (United States) Justin Gimelstob	(Australia) Todd Woodbridge (Australia) Mark Woodforde	5–7, 7–6^{(7–4)}, 6–3
Atlanta; United States	2000	(South Africa) Ellis Ferreira (United States) Rick Leach	(The Bahamas) Mark Knowles (United States) Justin Gimelstob	6–3, 6–4
Atlanta; United States	2001	(India) Mahesh Bhupathi (India) Leander Paes	(United States) Rick Leach (United States) David Macpherson	6–3, 7–6^{(9–7)}
