= Alexis Hombrecher =

German-born American tennis player

- Full name: Alexis Hombrecher
- Country (sports): United States
- Born: January 29, 1971 (age 54); Wertheim, West Germany
- Prize money: $44,404

Singles
- Career record: 2–6
- Career titles: 0
- Highest ranking: No. 332 (25 March 1991)

Doubles
- Career record: 5–10
- Career titles: 0
- Highest ranking: No. 194 (22 April 1991)

Grand Slam doubles results
- US Open: 1R (1990)

Alexis Hombrecher (born January 29, 1971) is a German born former professional tennis player from the United States.

== Biography ==
The Wertheim native moved with his family to the United States in 1983 at the age of 12, settling in Suisun City, California. Known for his unorthodox but powerful serve, he reached the top 5 in the national 18s rankings and won the 1989 USTA National 18-and-Under Hard Court Championships. He beat Michael Sell in the 4th round of the 1989 Boys' Junior National Tennis Championship but fell to eventual champion Chuck Adams in the semi-finals. Hombrecher played collegiately for Stanford University.

He competed on the ATP Tour and Challenger Series circuits. He made a total of six main draw appearances at ATP Tour level, across 1990 and 1991. His best result came as a wildcard at the 1990 Prudential-Bache Securities Classic, beating David Engel in the 1st round, then receiving a walkover against Aaron Krickstein to advance to the quarters, where he lost to David Pate. In doubles he made the semi-finals once, at the 1990 Riklis Classic in Tel Aviv, with Gilad Bloom. Other doubles partners on the ATP Tour included Todd Martin and MaliVai Washington. It was with Washington that he made his only Grand Slam appearance, the men's doubles at the 1990 US Open. He won the Thessaloniki Challenger tournament in 1990 and played in the singles draw at the 1991 Lipton International Players Championships, a top tier event now known as the Miami Masters.

== Challenger titles ==
=== Doubles: (1) ===
Year	Tournament	Surface	Partner	Opponents	Score
1990	Thessaloniki, Greece	Hard	(Israel) Gilad Bloom	(United Kingdom) Nick Brown (Sweden) Johan Carlsson	6–1, 7–6
