= Scott Melville =

American tennis player

- Country (sports): United States
- Born: August 4, 1966 (age 59) Fort Ord, California, U.S.
- Height: 6 ft 2 in (188 cm)
- Plays: Right-handed
- Prize money: $851,666

Singles
- Career record: 5–4
- Highest ranking: No. 182 (April 15, 1991)

Grand Slam singles results
- US Open: 1R (1988)

Doubles
- Career record: 153–159
- Career titles: 9
- Highest ranking: No. 17 (February 19, 1996)

Grand Slam doubles results
- Australian Open: QF (1993, 1995, 1996)
- French Open: 3R (1995)
- Wimbledon: F (1995)
- US Open: QF (1995)

Grand Slam mixed doubles results
- Australian Open: 2R (1994, 1995)
- French Open: SF (1994)
- Wimbledon: 1R (1991, 1993, 1994, 1997)
- US Open: QF (1995)

Scott Melville (born August 4, 1966) is a former professional tennis player from the United States.

Melville enjoyed most of his tennis success while playing doubles because of injuries. During his career, he won nine doubles titles and finished runner-up an additional seven times. Partnering Rick Leach in doubles, Melville finished runner-up at the 1995 Wimbledon Championships. He achieved a career-high doubles ranking of World No. 17 in 1996. He is now a coach and has coached many college level tennis players.

Melville resided in Ponte Vedra Beach, Florida when on the tour.

== College career ==
Melville played for the USC Trojans in college. In 1987, Melville and Rick Leach won the NCAA tennis doubles with an 18–1 record. Melville then became the no.1 singles player in college tennis by beating David Wheaton. In 1988, he partnered with Eric Amend to win the Pac-10 Doubles title and the ITA National Indoor Doubles Championship.

== Professional career ==
In 1989, Melville and Jeff Brown entered the Association of Tennis Professionals (ATP) circuit. In 1990, they qualified for the New Haven Volvo International Tournament ranked 400th in the world. In that tournament, they pulled off upset wins against bigger stars and made it all the way to the finals. There, they won over Goran Ivanišević and Petr Korda, 2–6, 7–5, 6–0. As a result, they climbed into the top 100 of the world rankings, won the $1 million grand prize, and qualified for that year's U.S. Open. There, they defeated the duo of Pete Sampras and Jim Courier to advance to the Round of 16.

In 1992, Melville and Patrick Galbraith won the ATP tournament held in Nice, France.

== Career finals ==
=== Doubles (9 titles, 7 runner-ups) ===
Result	No.	Date	Tournament	Surface	Partner	Opponents	Score
Win	1.	1990	New Haven, U.S.	Hard	(United States) Jeff Brown	(Czech Republic) Petr Korda (Socialist Federal Republic of Yugoslavia) Goran Ivanišević	2–6, 7–5, 6–0
Win	2.	1991	Orlando, U.S.	Hard	(United States) Luke Jensen	(Venezuela) Nicolás Pereira (United States) Pete Sampras	6–7, 7–6, 6–3
Loss	1.	1991	New Haven, U.S.	Hard	(United States) Jeff Brown	(Czech Republic) Petr Korda (Australia) Wally Masur	5–7, 3–6
Win	3.	1992	Nice, France	Clay	(United States) Patrick Galbraith	(South Africa) Pieter Aldrich (South Africa) Danie Visser	6–1, 3–6, 6–4
Loss	2.	1993	Doha, Qatar	Hard	(United States) Shelby Cannon	(Germany) Boris Becker (Germany) Patrik Kühnen	2–6, 4–6
Loss	3.	1993	Indian Wells, U.S.	Hard	(United States) Luke Jensen	(France) Guy Forget (France) Henri Leconte	4–6, 5–7
Win	4.	1993	Barcelona, Spain	Clay	(United States) Shelby Cannon	(Spain) Sergio Casal (Spain) Emilio Sánchez	7–6, 6–1
Loss	4.	1993	Nice, France	Clay	(United States) Shelby Cannon	(Australia) David Macpherson (Australia) Laurie Warder	4–3, RET.
Loss	5.	1993	Madrid, Spain	Clay	(United States) Luke Jensen	(Spain) Tomás Carbonell (Spain) Carlos Costa	6–7, 2–6
Win	5.	1994	Hamburg, Germany	Clay	(South Africa) Piet Norval	(Sweden) Henrik Holm (Sweden) Anders Järryd	6–3, 6–4
Win	6.	1994	Stuttgart Outdoor, Germany	Clay	(South Africa) Piet Norval	(Netherlands) Jacco Eltingh (Netherlands) Paul Haarhuis	7–6, 7–5
Loss	6.	1995	Wimbledon, London	Grass	(United States) Rick Leach	(Australia) Todd Woodbridge (Australia) Mark Woodforde	5–7, 6–7, 6–7
Win	7.	1995	New Haven, U.S.	Hard	(United States) Rick Leach	(India) Leander Paes (Venezuela) Nicolás Pereira	7–6, 6–4
Loss	7.	1995	Long Island, U.S.	Hard	(United States) Rick Leach	(Czech Republic) Cyril Suk (Czech Republic) Daniel Vacek	7–5, 6–7, 6–7
Win	8.	1996	Jakarta, Indonesia	Hard	(United States) Rick Leach	(United States) Kent Kinnear (United States) Dave Randall	6–1, 2–6, 6–1
Win	9.	1997	St. Poelten, Austria	Clay	(United States) Kelly Jones	(United States) Luke Jensen (United States) Murphy Jensen	6–2, 7–6

== Doubles performance timeline ==
Key
W	F	SF	QF	#R	RR	Q#	DNQ	A	NH

(W) winner; (F) finalist; (SF) semifinalist; (QF) quarterfinalist; (#R) rounds 4, 3, 2, 1; (RR) round-robin stage; (Q#) qualification round; (DNQ) did not qualify; (A) absent; (NH) not held; (SR) strike rate (events won / competed); (W–L) win–loss record.

Tournament	1988	1989	1990	1991	1992	1993	1994	1995	1996	1997	1998	1999	Career SR	Career win–loss
Grand Slam tournaments
Australian Open	A	A	A	A	1R	QF	1R	QF	QF	2R	A	A	0 / 6	10–6
French Open	A	A	A	2R	A	1R	1R	3R	A	1R	A	A	0 / 5	3–5
Wimbledon	A	A	A	1R	A	2R	1R	F	A	1R	A	A	0 / 5	6–5
U.S. Open	A	A	3R	1R	A	1R	1R	QF	A	A	A	A	0 / 5	5–5
Grand Slam SR	0 / 0	0 / 0	0 / 1	0 / 3	0 / 1	0 / 4	0 / 4	0 / 4	0 / 1	0 / 3	0 / 0	0 / 0	0 / 21	N/A
Annual win–loss	0–0	0–0	2–1	1–3	0–1	4–4	0–4	13–4	3–1	1–3	0–0	0–0	N/A	24–21
Masters Series
Indian Wells	NME		A	1R	A	F	QF	1R	1R	A	A	A	0 / 5	6–5
Miami	NME		A	1R	1R	2R	2R	3R	3R	2R	A	A	0 / 7	4–7
Monte Carlo	NME		A	A	2R	A	1R	1R	A	A	A	A	0 / 3	1–3
Rome	NME		A	A	1R	A	2R	QF	A	1R	A	A	0 / 4	3–4
Hamburg	NME		A	A	QF	1R	W	2R	A	A	A	A	1 / 4	8–3
Canada	NME		A	A	A	2R	1R	1R	A	A	A	A	0 / 3	1–3
Cincinnati	NME		A	1R	A	2R	1R	1R	A	A	A	A	0 / 4	1–4
Stuttgart (Stockholm)	NME		2R	A	A	QF	2R	2R	A	A	A	A	0 / 4	3–4
Paris	NME		A	2R	A	1R	1R	2R	A	A	A	A	0 / 4	1–4
Masters Series SR	N/A		0 / 1	0 / 4	0 / 4	0 / 7	1 / 9	0 / 9	0 / 2	0 / 2	0 / 0	0 / 0	1 / 38	N/A
Annual win–loss	N/A		1–1	1–4	3–4	8–7	9–8	5–9	1–2	0–2	0–0	0–0	N/A	28–37
Year-end ranking	618	773	58	66	146	19	38	21	105	150	1384	1357	N/A	
