= Royce Deppe =

South African tennis player

- Country (sports): South Africa
- Residence: Memphis, Tennessee
- Born: 11 August 1965 (age 60) Durban, South Africa
- Height: 1.88 m (6 ft 2 in)
- Turned pro: 1988
- Plays: Right-handed
- Prize money: $192,064

Singles
- Career record: 1–3
- Career titles: 0
- Highest ranking: No. 224 (16 July 1990)

Doubles
- Career record: 45–76
- Career titles: 1
- Highest ranking: No. 75 (23 November 1992)

Grand Slam doubles results
- Australian Open: 1R (1993, 1994)
- French Open: 2R (1993)
- Wimbledon: QF (1993)
- US Open: 3R (1990)

Royce Deppe (born 11 August 1965, in Durban, South Africa) is a former professional tennis player from South Africa. He enjoyed most of his tennis success while playing doubles. During his career he won 1 doubles title. He achieved a career-high doubles ranking of world No. 75 in 1992.

== Career finals ==
=== Doubles (1 title, 2 runner-ups) ===
Result	No.	Date	Tournament	Surface	Partner	Opponents	Score
Loss	1.	Jun 1992	Florence, Italy	Clay	(South Africa) Brent Haygarth	(Uruguay) Marcelo Filippini (Brazil) Luiz Mattar	4–6, 7–6, 4–6
Win	1.	Jul 1992	Newport, U.S.	Grass	(Czech Republic) David Rikl	(United States) Paul Annacone (United States) David Wheaton	6–4, 6–4
Loss	2.	Oct 1993	Athens, Greece	Clay	(United States) John Sullivan	(Argentina) Horacio de la Peña (Mexico) Jorge Lozano	6–3, 1–6, 2–6
