= Nicolás Pereira =

Venezuelan tennis player (born 1970)

- Country (sports): Venezuela
- Residence: Caracas, Venezuela
- Born: 29 September 1970 (age 55) Salto, Uruguay
- Height: 1.88 m (6 ft 2 in)
- Turned pro: 1987
- Retired: 1997
- Plays: Right-handed (one-handed backhand)
- Prize money: $1,077,159

Singles
- Career record: 81–125
- Career titles: 2
- Highest ranking: No. 74 (22 July 1996)

Grand Slam singles results
- Australian Open: 2R (1990, 1995)
- French Open: 2R (1989)
- Wimbledon: 2R (1994, 1996)
- US Open: 3R (1995)

Doubles
- Career record: 114–133
- Career titles: 3
- Highest ranking: No. 44 (19 November 1990)

Grand Slam doubles results
- Australian Open: 2R (1991, 1996)
- French Open: 3R (1990)
- Wimbledon: 3R (1989)
- US Open: 3R (1996)

Grand Slam mixed doubles results
- French Open: 2R (1991)
- Wimbledon: 1R (1990, 1993)
- Last updated on: 11 December 2021.

Nicolás Pereira (born September 29, 1970) is a Venezuelan former professional tennis player and commentator. As a player, Pereira became the ITF Junior World Champion in 1988 after winning the French Open, Wimbledon, and the US Open. He won two ATP Tour singles titles and three in doubles. Since retirement, he has been a commentator for the Tennis Channel.

== Professional career ==
In the fall of 1988, Pereira registered wins on the pro tour against Brad Gilbert and Amos Mansdorf. He finished 1988 ranked No. 151 in the world rankings.

In April 1989, Pereira reached the quarterfinals of the Japan Open, defeating No. 21 ranked Andrés Gómez before losing to No. 1 ranked Ivan Lendl. In June, he defeated world No. 3 Stefan Edberg in straight sets in the first round of the Queens Club grass-court tournament.

A few weeks later, in the first round of Wimbledon, he took eventual semifinalist Lendl to five sets before losing. Later that summer, he reached the quarterfinals of the Grand Prix event in Montreal, the Canadian Open. There he beat No. 10 ranked Tim Mayotte, then lost to No. 14 ranked Jay Berger. Pereira, at 19 years of age, finished 1989 ranked No. 121.

However, Pereira's progress stalled over the next three years. In 1990, he lost most of his matches in the first round of ATP level tournaments and finished the year ranked No. 238. In 1991, he won the Lins and São Paulo-4 Challengers in back-to-back weeks, and ended the year ranked No. 146. He won the Guarujá Brazil Challenger in September 1992 and was ranked No. 138 at the end of the year.

In 1993, Pereira defeated Aaron Krickstein in the first round at the Bermuda Challenger. At the end of 1993, Pereira was ranked No. 141.

1994 marked a resurgence for Pereira. In March, he won the San Luis Potosí Challenger. At Wimbledon, he reached the second round where he lost a thrilling five-set match to No. 18 Andre Agassi. In September, Pereira defeated Mauricio Hadad in the final of the Bancolombia Open to win his first ATP singles title. He closed out 1994 ranked No. 110. 1995 was a mixed year for Pereira. In July, he won the Rio Brazil Challenger title by defeating João Cunha e Silva in straight sets. The next week at New Haven, he defeated MaliVai Washington in the second round, then lost to No. 10 Marc Rosset.

At the U.S. Open, Pereira reached the third round of a Grand Slam tournament for the first time. At the end of the year, Nicolas was ranked No. 134.

1996 was another inconsistent year for Pereira. He started the year well in Doha by qualifying, then defeated world No. 5 Boris Becker 7–6, 6–7, 7–6 in the second round to reach the quarterfinals. In March, Pereira again caused an upset when he defeated world No. 1 Thomas Muster in straight sets at the Masters Series tournament in Key Biscayne, Florida. In July, Pereira won his second ATP title, defeating Grant Stafford on the grass courts at Newport, Rhode Island. He reached his career-high ATP singles ranking of No. 74 the following week on July 22, 1996.

Pereira represented Venezuela at the 1996 Summer Olympics in Atlanta, losing in the second round to eventual bronze medalist Leander Paes. He finished the year ranked No. 110.

Pereira retired in September 1997.

== ATP career finals ==
=== Singles: 2 (2 titles) ===
Legend Grand Slam Tournaments (0–0) ATP World Tour Finals (0–0) ATP World Tour Masters 1000 (0–0) ATP World Tour 500 Series (0–0) ATP World Tour 250 Series (2–0)	Finals by surface Hard (0–0) Clay (1–0) Grass (1–0) Carpet (0–0)	Finals by setting Outdoors (2–0) Indoors (0–0)

Result	W–L	Date	Tournament	Tier	Surface	Opponent	Score
Win	1–0	Sep 1994	Bogotá, Colombia	World Series	Clay	(Colombia) Mauricio Hadad	6–3, 3–6, 6–4
Win	2–0	Jul 1996	Newport, United States	World Series	Grass	(South Africa) Grant Stafford	4–6, 6–4, 6–4

=== Doubles: 7 (3 titles, 4 runner-ups) ===
Legend Grand Slam Tournaments (0–0) ATP World Tour Finals (0–0) ATP Masters Series (0–0) ATP Championship Series (0–1) ATP World Series (3–3)	Finals by surface Hard (2–2) Clay (1–1) Grass (0–0) Carpet (0–1)	Finals by setting Outdoors (3–3) Indoors (0–1)

Result	W–L	Date	Tournament	Tier	Surface	Partner	Opponents	Score
Win	1–0	Jan 1990	Wellington, New Zealand	World Series	Hard	(New Zealand) Kelly Evernden	(Spain) Sergio Casal (Spain) Emilio Sánchez Vicario	6–4, 7–6
Loss	1–1	Mar 1990	Rotterdam, Netherlands	World Series	Carpet	(Italy) Diego Nargiso	(Mexico) Leonardo Lavalle (Mexico) Jorge Lozano	6–7, 4–6
Win	2–1	Jan 1991	Wellington, New Zealand	World Series	Hard	(Brazil) Luiz Mattar	(United States) John Letts (Brazil) Jaime Oncins	4–6, 7–6, 6–2
Loss	2–2	Apr 1991	Orlando, United States	World Series	Hard	(United States) Pete Sampras	(United States) Luke Jensen (United States) Scott Melville	7–6^{(7–5)}, 6–7^{(6–8)}, 3–6
Loss	2–3	Aug 1995	New Haven, United States	Championship Series	Hard	(India) Leander Paes	(United States) Rick Leach (United States) Scott Melville	3–6, 7–5, 4–6
Loss	2–4	Mar 1996	Mexico City, Mexico	World Series	Clay	(Spain) Emilio Sánchez	(United States) Donald Johnson (United States) Francisco Montana	2–6, 4–6
Win	3–4	Jan 1991	Bogotá, Colombia	World Series	Clay	(Czech Republic) David Rikl	(Ecuador) Pablo Campana (Ecuador) Nicolás Lapentti	6–3, 7–6

== ATP Challenger and ITF Futures finals ==
=== Singles: 10 (5–5) ===
Legend ATP Challenger (5–5) ITF Futures (0–0)	Finals by surface Hard (2–2) Clay (3–3) Grass (0–0) Carpet (0–0)

Result	W–L	Date	Tournament	Tier	Surface	Opponent	Score
Win	1–0	Aug 1991	Lins, Brazil	Challenger	Clay	(Argentina) Luis Lobo	2–6, 6–3, 7–6
Win	2–0	Aug 1991	São Paulo, Brazil	Challenger	Clay	(Argentina) Martin Stringari	6–3, 6–2
Loss	2–1	Sep 1991	Madeira, Portugal	Challenger	Hard	(Zimbabwe) Byron Black	3–6, 4–6
Loss	2–2	Aug 1992	São Paulo, Brazil	Challenger	Clay	(Argentina) Martin Stringari	3–6, 6–3, 2–6
Win	3–2	Sep 1992	Guarujá, Brazil	Challenger	Hard	(Brazil) Roberto Jabali	6–4, 6–4
Loss	3–3	Sep 1993	São Paulo, Brazil	Challenger	Hard	(Brazil) Fernando Meligeni	5–7, 2–6
Loss	3–4	Oct 1993	Cali, Colombia	Challenger	Clay	(Colombia) Mauricio Hadad	6–7, 6–7
Win	4–4	Apr 1994	San Luis Potosí, Mexico	Challenger	Clay	(Mexico) Luis Herrera	6–7, 6–2, 6–2
Win	5–4	Aug 1995	Rio de Janeiro, Brazil	Challenger	Hard	(Portugal) João Cunha-Silva	7–5, 6–3
Loss	5–5	Nov 1995	Santiago, Chile	Challenger	Clay	(Ecuador) Nicolás Lapentti	6–7, 3–6

=== Doubles: 14 (8–6) ===
Legend ATP Challenger (7–6) ITF Futures (1–0)	Finals by surface Hard (3–4) Clay (4–2) Grass (1–0) Carpet (0–0)

Result	W–L	Date	Tournament	Tier	Surface	Partner	Opponents	Score
Win	1–0	Jul 1991	Salerno, Italy	Challenger	Clay	(South Africa) Marcos Ondruska	(Spain) Emilio Benfele Álvarez (Italy) Pietro Pennisi	6–4, 6–4
Win	2–0	Aug 1992	Lins, Brazil	Challenger	Clay	(Portugal) João Cunha-Silva	(Brazil) Cássio Motta (Brazil) Fernando Roese	6–3, 6–4
Loss	2–1	Aug 1992	São Paulo, Brazil	Challenger	Clay	(Portugal) João Cunha-Silva	(Argentina) Pablo Albano (Brazil) Cássio Motta	walkover
Win	3–1	Sep 1992	Bogotá, Colombia	Challenger	Clay	(Puerto Rico) Mario Tabares	(Brazil) William Kyriakos (Brazil) Fernando Meligeni	7–6, 7–5
Loss	3–2	Oct 1992	Ponte Vedra, United States	Challenger	Hard	(Czech Republic) Daniel Vacek	(United States) Jared Palmer (United States) Jim Pugh	6–1, 3–6, 2–6
Win	4–2	Jul 1993	Belo Horizonte, Brazil	Challenger	Hard	(Brazil) Ricardo Acioly	(Brazil) Fernando Roese (Chile) Felipe Rivera	7–6, 5–7, 6–3
Loss	4–3	Sep 1993	Caracas, Venezuela	Challenger	Hard	(United States) Doug Flach	(United States) Richard Matuszewski (United States) John Sullivan	6–7, 5–7
Loss	4–4	Dec 1993	Paget, Bermuda	Challenger	Clay	(Venezuela) Maurice Ruah	(The Bahamas) Mark Knowles (United States) Jared Palmer	1–6, 3–6
Win	5–4	Apr 1994	Puerto Vallarta, Mexico	Challenger	Hard	(Argentina) Pablo Albano	(Australia) Paul Kilderry (Australia) Simon Youl	6–4, 3–6, 7–6
Win	6–4	Jul 1995	Annenheim, Austria	Challenger	Grass	(Italy) Diego Nargiso	(Germany) Karsten Braasch (Germany) Joern Renzenbrink	6–7, 6–4, 7–6
Win	7–4	Aug 1995	Brasília, Brazil	Challenger	Hard	(France) Jean-Philippe Fleurian	(Israel) Noam Behr (Israel) Lior Mor	7–6, 6–2
Loss	7–5	Aug 1995	Rio de Janeiro, Brazil	Challenger	Hard	(France) Jean-Philippe Fleurian	(Portugal) João Cunha-Silva (Mexico) Óscar Ortiz	5–7, 6–4, 1–6
Loss	7–6	Oct 1995	Monterrey, Mexico	Challenger	Hard	(Czech Republic) David Rikl	(The Bahamas) Mark Knowles (Canada) Daniel Nestor	6–3, 1–6, 4–6
Win	8–6	May 2001	USA F12, Hallandale Beach	Futures	Clay	(Venezuela) José de Armas	(United States) Steve Berke (United States) Kyle Porter	6–4, 2–6, 6–2

== Junior Grand Slam finals ==
=== Singles: 3 (3 titles) ===
Result	Year	Tournament	Surface	Opponent	Score
Win	1988	French Open	Clay	(Sweden) Magnus Larsson	7–6, 6–3
Win	1988	Wimbledon	Grass	(France) Guillaume Raoux	7–6, 6–2
Win	1988	US Open	Hard	(Sweden) Nicklas Kulti	6–1, 6–2

== Performance timelines ==
Key
W	F	SF	QF	#R	RR	Q#	DNQ	A	NH

(W) winner; (F) finalist; (SF) semifinalist; (QF) quarterfinalist; (#R) rounds 4, 3, 2, 1; (RR) round-robin stage; (Q#) qualification round; (DNQ) did not qualify; (A) absent; (NH) not held; (SR) strike rate (events won / competed); (W–L) win–loss record.

=== Singles ===
Tournament	1988	1989	1990	1991	1992	1993	1994	1995	1996	1997	SR	W–L	Win %
Grand Slam tournaments
Australian Open	A	A	2R	Q3	A	1R	A	2R	Q2	1R	0 / 4	2–4	33%
French Open	A	2R	1R	A	A	A	A	A	1R	Q2	0 / 3	1–3	25%
Wimbledon	Q1	1R	A	A	Q2	1R	2R	1R	2R	1R	0 / 6	2–6	25%
US Open	A	1R	A	A	Q1	2R	1R	3R	1R	Q2	0 / 5	3–5	38%
Win–loss	0–0	1–3	1–2	0–0	0–0	1–3	1–2	3–3	1–3	0–2	0 / 18	8–18	31%
ATP Masters Series
Miami	A	1R	1R	A	A	A	1R	A	3R	A	0 / 4	2–4	33%
Rome	A	Q1	A	A	A	A	A	A	A	A	0 / 0	0–0	–
Canada	A	QF	A	A	A	A	2R	A	A	A	0 / 2	4–2	67%
Cincinnati	A	A	2R	A	A	A	Q1	A	A	A	0 / 1	1–1	50%
Paris	A	A	A	A	A	Q2	A	A	A	A	0 / 0	0–0	–
Win–loss	0–0	3–2	1–2	0–0	0–0	0–0	1–2	0–0	2–1	0–0	0 / 7	7–7	50%

=== Doubles ===
Tournament	1988	1989	1990	1991	1992	1993	1994	1995	1996	1997	SR	W–L	Win %
Grand Slam tournaments
Australian Open	A	A	1R	2R	A	1R	A	1R	2R	1R	0 / 6	2–6	25%
French Open	A	1R	3R	1R	A	A	A	A	1R	1R	0 / 5	2–5	29%
Wimbledon	Q1	3R	2R	A	Q1	2R	1R	A	2R	1R	0 / 6	5–6	45%
US Open	A	2R	1R	A	A	1R	1R	1R	3R	1R	0 / 7	3–7	30%
Win–loss	0–0	3–3	3–4	1–2	0–0	1–3	0–2	0–2	4–4	0–4	0 / 24	12–24	33%
ATP Masters Series
Miami	A	A	1R	2R	1R	A	2R	A	2R	A	0 / 5	3–5	38%
Rome	A	2R	A	2R	A	A	A	A	A	A	0 / 2	2–2	50%
Canada	A	1R	2R	A	A	A	2R	A	A	A	0 / 3	2–3	40%
Cincinnati	A	A	1R	A	A	A	1R	A	A	A	0 / 2	0–2	0%
Win–loss	0–0	1–2	1–3	2–2	0–1	0–0	2–3	0–0	1–1	0–0	0 / 12	7–12	37%

== See also ==
List of Grand Slam Boys' Singles champions
