= Alfonso Mora =

Venezuelan tennis player

- Country (sports): Venezuela
- Born: May 23, 1964 (age 61) Washington, D.C., U.S.
- Height: 6 ft 2 in (188 cm)
- Plays: Right-handed
- Prize money: $105,367

Singles
- Career record: 0–0
- Highest ranking: No. 636 (May 2, 1988)

Doubles
- Career record: 32–59
- Career titles: 2
- Highest ranking: No. 89 (March 25, 1991)

Grand Slam doubles results
- Australian Open: 1R (1990, 1991)
- French Open: 2R (1990)
- Wimbledon: 1R (1990, 1991)
- US Open: 1R (1989, 1990, 1991)

Grand Slam mixed doubles results
- French Open: 1R (1990)
- Wimbledon: 1R (1990)

Alfonso Mora (Spanish pronunciation: [alˈfonso ˈmoɾa]; born May 23, 1964) an American-Venezuelan former professional tennis player. He enjoyed most of his tennis success while playing doubles. During his career he won 2 doubles titles. He also played Davis-Cup for Venezuela and later was the team Captain of the Venezuelan Davis-Cup team. He achieved a career-high doubles ranking of World No. 89 in 1991. He is the husband of television personality Maite Delgado, brother of American television news anchor Antonio Mora and former brother-in-law of model Ines Rivero.

== Career finals ==
=== Doubles (2 titles, 1 runner-up) ===
Result	W-L	Date	Tournament	Surface	Partner	Opponents	Score
Loss	0–1	Apr 1990	Orlando, U.S.	Hard	(United States) Brian Page	(United States) Scott Davis (United States) David Pate	3–6, 6–7^{(5–7)}
Win	1–1	Oct 1990	São Paulo, Brazil	Hard	(United States) Shelby Cannon	(Netherlands) Mark Koevermans (Brazil) Luiz Mattar	6–7, 6–3, 7–6
Win	2–1	Jun 1991	Genova, Italy	Clay	(Spain) Marcos Aurelio Gorriz	(Italy) Massimo Ardinghi (Italy) Massimo Boscatto	5–7, 7–5, 6–3
