= Joey Rive =

American tennis player

- Country (sports): United States
- Born: July 8, 1963 (age 63) Santurce, Puerto Rico, US
- Height: 6 ft 1 in (2 m)
- Turned pro: 1985
- Plays: Left-handed
- Prize money: $388,558

Singles
- Career record: 56–75
- Career titles: 0
- Highest ranking: No. 57 (May 16, 1988)

Grand Slam singles results
- Australian Open: 3R (1988)
- French Open: 1R (1988, 1990)
- Wimbledon: 2R (1989, 1990)
- US Open: 1R (1987, 1988, 1989, 1990)

Doubles
- Career record: 63–83
- Career titles: 0
- Highest ranking: No. 48 (January 30, 1989)

Grand Slam doubles results
- Australian Open: 3R (1989)
- French Open: 3R (1987)
- Wimbledon: 2R (1990, 1991)
- US Open: 2R (1988, 1989)

Joey Rive (born July 8, 1963) is a former professional tennis player from the United States. He was born in Santurce, Puerto Rico.

Rive achieved a career-high singles ranking of world No. 57 in 1988.

During his career Rive finished runner-up in four doubles events. His highest doubles ranking was world No. 48, reached in 1989.

He was the head tennis coach at the University of Alabama for the Alabama Crimson Tide for three seasons, 1995-1997, and at TCU from 2001-2006. He now serves as the director of tennis/racquet sports at Colonial Country Club (Fort Worth) in Fort Worth, Texas.

== Doubles (4 losses) ==
Result	W/L	Date	Tournament	Surface	Partner	Opponents	Score
Loss	0–1	Jul 1986	Båstad, Sweden	Clay	(South Africa) Craig Campbell	(Spain) Sergio Casal (Spain) Emilio Sánchez	4–6, 2–6
Loss	0–2	Jan 1988	Sydney Outdoor, Australia	Grass	(United States) Bud Schultz	(Australia) Darren Cahill (Australia) Mark Kratzmann	6–7, 4–6
Loss	0–3	Nov 1989	Johannesburg, South Africa	Hard (i)	(United States) Kelly Jones	(United States) Luke Jensen (United States) Richey Reneberg	0–6, 4–6
Loss	0–4	Apr 1990	Hong Kong	Hard	(United States) Kevin Curren	(Australia) Pat Cash (Australia) Wally Masur	3–6, 3–6
