= Scott Davis (tennis) =

American tennis player

- Country (sports): United States
- Residence: Irvine, California, U.S.
- Born: August 27, 1962 (age 64) Santa Monica, California, U.S.
- Height: 1.87 m (6 ft 2 in)
- Turned pro: 1983
- Retired: 1998
- Plays: Right-handed (one-handed backhand)
- Prize money: $2,287,611

Singles
- Career record: 206–198
- Career titles: 3
- Highest ranking: No. 11 (October 28, 1985)

Grand Slam singles results
- Australian Open: QF (1984)
- French Open: 1R (1980, 1987, 1990, 1991)
- Wimbledon: 4R (1984)
- US Open: 3R (1982, 1988)

Doubles
- Career record: 368–286
- Career titles: 22
- Highest ranking: No. 2 (January 28, 1991)

Grand Slam doubles results
- Australian Open: W (1991)
- French Open: 4R (1996)
- Wimbledon: QF (1992)
- US Open: F (1991)

Scott Davis (born August 27, 1962) is an American former professional tennis player. He reached a career high singles ranking of world No. 11 (in October 1985) and doubles ranking of world No. 2 (in January 1991).

== Tennis career ==
A right-handed serve and volleyer, Davis played 14 years on the tour. He won three singles titles – the 1983 Maui, 1985 Tokyo Outdoor, and 1990 Auckland Grand Prix events – and 22 doubles titles. His biggest doubles tournament win was the 1991 Australian Open, partnering David Pate. Other big doubles wins included the 1990 Los Angeles, Indianapolis, and Paris Open, and 1993 Indianapolis Grand Prix events, all partnering Pate. Davis was also doubles finalist at the 1991 US Open with Pate. In 1985, he had won the Los Angeles Open with Robert Van't Hof as an unseeded team.

Prior to turning professional, Davis played college tennis at Stanford University, leading the Cardinal to the 1983 NCAA team championship for coach Dick Gould.

Davis attended Palisades High School in Pacific Palisades California. The Team was named National Champions in 1979 and 1980. He played for Coach Bud Ware (1978–79)and Coach Bud Kling (1979–80). He was also ranked #1 in the World for Junior Singles.

Davis is married to pilates instructor Shellie.

Since retiring from the tour in 1998, Davis has been active on the over-35 senior tour and as a private tennis coach.

== Career finals ==
=== Singles: 10 (3 titles / 7 runner-ups) ===
Result	W-L	Date	Tournament	Surface	Opponent	Score
Loss	0–1	Jul 1981	Napa, U.S.	Hard	(United States) Sammy Giammalva Jr.	3–6, 7–5, 1–6
Loss	0–2	Jul 1983	Newport, U.S.	Grass	(Australia) John Fitzgerald	6–2, 1–6, 3–6
Win	1–2	Oct 1983	Maui, U.S.	Hard	(United States) Vincent Van Patten	6–3, 6–7^{(2–7)}, 7–6^{(7–4)}
Loss	1–3	Nov 1983	Tokyo Indoor, Japan	Carpet (i)	(Czechoslovakia) Ivan Lendl	6–3, 3–6, 4–6
Loss	1–4	Nov 1983	Taipei, Taiwan	Carpet (i)	(Nigeria) Nduka Odizor	4–6, 6–3, 4–6
Loss	1–5	Feb 1985	Delray Beach, U.S.	Hard	(United States) Tim Mayotte	6–4, 6–4, 3–6, 2–6, 4–6
Win	2–5	Oct 1985	Tokyo Outdoor, Japan	Hard	(United States) Jimmy Arias	6–1, 7–6^{(7–3)}
Loss	2–6	Nov 1986	Houston, U.S.	Carpet (i)	(Socialist Federal Republic of Yugoslavia) Slobodan Živojinović	1–6, 6–4, 3–6
Loss	2–7	Jul 1989	Schenectady, U.S.	Hard	(Australia) Simon Youl	6–2, 4–6, 4–6
Win	3–7	Jan 1990	Auckland, New Zealand	Hard	(Soviet Union) Andrei Chesnokov	4–6, 6–3, 6–3

=== Doubles: 41 (22 titles / 19 runner-ups) ===
Result	W-L	Date	Tournament	Surface	Partner	Opponents	Score
Win	1–0	Aug 1983	Columbus, U.S.	Hard	(United States) Brian Teacher	(India) Vijay Amritraj (Australia) John Fitzgerald	6–1, 4–6, 7–6
Loss	1–1	Oct 1983	Maui, U.S.	Hard	(United States) Mike Bauer	(United States) Tony Giammalva (United States) Steve Meister	3–6, 7–5, 4–6
Loss	1–2	Mar 1984	La Quinta, U.S.	Hard	(United States) Ferdi Taygan	(South Africa) Bernard Mitton (United States) Butch Walts	6–4, 4–6, 6–7
Win	2–2	Aug 1984	Livingston, U.S.	Hard	(United States) Ben Testerman	(United States) Paul Annacone (Canada) Glenn Michibata	6–4, 6–4
Win	3–2	Aug 1985	Stratton Mountain, U.S.	Hard	(United States) David Pate	(United States) Ken Flach (United States) Robert Seguso	3–6, 7–6, 7–6
Win	4–2	Sep 1985	Los Angeles, U.S.	Hard	(United States) Robert Van't Hof	(United States) Paul Annacone (South Africa) Christo van Rensburg	6–3, 7–6
Win	5–2	Oct 1985	Tokyo Outdoor, Japan	Hard	(United States) David Pate	(United States) Sammy Giammalva Jr. (United States) Greg Holmes	7–6, 6–7, 6–3
Loss	5–3	Oct 1985	Tokyo Indoor, Japan	Carpet (i)	(United States) David Pate	(United States) Ken Flach (United States) Robert Seguso	6–4, 3–6, 6–7
Win	6–3	Feb 1986	Philadelphia, U.S.	Carpet (i)	(United States) David Pate	(Sweden) Stefan Edberg (Sweden) Anders Järryd	7–6, 3–6, 6–3, 7–5
Loss	6–4	Oct 1986	Scottsdale, U.S.	Hard	(United States) David Pate	(Mexico) Leonardo Lavalle (United States) Mike Leach	6–7, 4–6
Loss	6–5	Nov 1987	Paris Masters, France	Carpet (i)	(United States) David Pate	(Switzerland) Jakob Hlasek (Switzerland) Claudio Mezzadri	6–7, 2–6
Loss	6–6	Nov 1987	Frankfurt, West Germany	Carpet (i)	(United States) David Pate	(West Germany) Boris Becker (West Germany) Patrik Kühnen	4–6, 2–6
Loss	6–7	Jul 1988	Newport, U.S.	Grass	(United States) Dan Goldie	(United States) Kelly Jones (Sweden) Peter Lundgren	3–6, 6–7
Loss	6–8	Oct 1988	San Francisco, U.S.	Hard (i)	(United States) Tim Wilkison	(United States) John McEnroe (Australia) Mark Woodforde	4–6, 6–7
Win	7–8	Oct 1988	Scottsdale, U.S.	Hard	(United States) Tim Wilkison	(United States) Rick Leach (United States) Jim Pugh	6–4, 7–6
Loss	7–9	Feb 1989	Memphis, U.S.	Hard (i)	(United States) Tim Wilkison	(United States) Paul Annacone (South Africa) Christo van Rensburg	4–6, 2–6
Win	8–9	Apr 1989	Seoul, South Korea	Hard	(Kenya) Paul Wekesa	(United States) John Letts (United States) Bruce Man-Son-Hing	6–2, 6–4
Win	9–9	Jul 1989	Schenectady, U.S.	Hard	(Australia) Broderick Dyke	(United States) Brad Pearce (South Africa) Byron Talbot	2–6, 6–4, 6–4
Win	10–9	Oct 1989	Orlando, U.S.	Hard	(United States) Tim Pawsat	(United States) Ken Flach (United States) Robert Seguso	7–5, 5–7, 6–4
Win	11–9	Apr 1990	Orlando, U.S.	Hard	(United States) David Pate	(Venezuela) Alfonso Mora (United States) Brian Page	6–3, 7–5
Win	12–9	May 1990	Kiawah Island, U.S.	Clay	(United States) David Pate	(United States) Jim Grabb (Mexico) Leonardo Lavalle	6–2, 6–3
Win	13–9	Aug 1990	Los Angeles, U.S.	Hard	(United States) David Pate	(Sweden) Peter Lundgren (Kenya) Paul Wekesa	3–6, 6–1, 6–3
Win	14–9	Aug 1990	Indianapolis, U.S.	Hard	(United States) David Pate	(Canada) Grant Connell (Canada) Glenn Michibata	7–6, 6–6
Loss	14–10	Oct 1990	Tokyo Indoor, Japan	Carpet (i)	(United States) David Pate	(France) Guy Forget (Switzerland) Jakob Hlasek	2–6, 6–4, 2–6
Win	15–10	Nov 1990	Paris Masters, France	Carpet (i)	(United States) David Pate	(Australia) Darren Cahill (Australia) Mark Kratzmann	5–7, 6–3, 6–4
Win	16–10	Jan 1991	Sydney Outdoor, Australia	Hard	(United States) David Pate	(Australia) Darren Cahill (Australia) Mark Kratzmann	3–6, 6–3, 6–2
Win	17–10	Jan 1991	Australian Open, Melbourne	Hard	(United States) David Pate	(United States) Patrick McEnroe (United States) David Wheaton	6–7, 7–6, 6–3, 7–5
Win	18–10	Mar 1991	Chicago, U.S.	Carpet (i)	(United States) David Pate	(Canada) Grant Connell (Canada) Glenn Michibata	6–4, 5–7, 7–6
Win	19–10	Jul 1991	Washington, U.S.	Hard	(United States) David Pate	(United States) Ken Flach (United States) Robert Seguso	6–4, 6–2
Loss	19–11	Sep 1991	US Open, New York	Hard	(United States) David Pate	(Australia) John Fitzgerald (Sweden) Anders Järryd	3–6, 6–3, 3–6, 3–6
Loss	19–12	Oct 1991	Tokyo Indoor, Japan	Carpet (i)	(United States) David Pate	(United States) Jim Grabb (United States) Richey Reneberg	3–6, 7–6, 2–6
Loss	19–13	Jan 1992	Sydney Outdoor, Australia	Hard	(United States) David Pate	(Spain) Sergio Casal (Spain) Emilio Sánchez	6–3, 1–6, 4–6
Win	20–13	Feb 1993	San Francisco, U.S.	Hard (i)	(Netherlands) Jacco Eltingh	(United States) Patrick McEnroe (United States) Jonathan Stark	6–1, 4–6, 7–5
Loss	19–14	Aug 1993	Los Angeles, U.S.	Hard	(Canada) Grant Connell	(South Africa) Wayne Ferreira (Germany) Michael Stich	6–7, 6–7
Win	21–14	Aug 1993	Indianapolis, U.S.	Hard	(United States) Todd Martin	(United States) Ken Flach (United States) Rick Leach	6–4, 6–4
Loss	21–15	Jun 1994	Manchester, UK	Grass	(United States) Trevor Kronemann	(United States) Rick Leach (South Africa) Danie Visser	4–6, 6–4, 6–7
Loss	21–16	Aug 1994	Los Angeles, U.S.	Hard	(United States) Brian MacPhie	(Australia) John Fitzgerald (Australia) Mark Woodforde	6–4, 2–6, 0–6
Loss	21–17	Aug 1995	Los Angeles, U.S.	Hard	(Croatia) Goran Ivanišević	(South Africa) Brent Haygarth (United States) Kent Kinnear	4–6, 6–7
Loss	21–18	Aug 1995	Indianapolis, U.S.	Hard	(United States) Todd Martin	(The Bahamas) Mark Knowles (Canada) Daniel Nestor	3–6, 5–7
Win	22–18	Jul 1996	Washington, U.S.	Hard	(Canada) Grant Connell	(United States) Doug Flach (United States) Chris Woodruff	7–6, 3–6, 6–3
Loss	22–19	May 1997	Atlanta, U.S.	Clay	(United States) Kelly Jones	(Sweden) Jonas Björkman (Sweden) Nicklas Kulti	2–6, 6–7
