= 1987 Paine Webber Classic =

- Date: March 16–22
- Edition: 3rd
- Category: Grand Prix
- Draw: 32S / 16D
- Prize money: $250,000
- Surface: Hard / outdoors
- Location: Fort Myers, Florida, U.S.
- Venue: Grand Cypress Resort
- Attendance: 33,163

Champions

Singles
- (South Africa) Christo van Rensburg

Doubles
- (United States) Sherwood Stewart / (Australia) Kim Warwick
← 1986 ·	Paine Webber Classic	· 1988 →

The 1987 Paine Webber Classic was a men's tennis tournament played on outdoor hard courts at the Grand Cypress Resort in Orlando, Florida in the United States that was part of the 1987 Nabisco Grand Prix. It was the third edition of the tournament and was held from March 16 through March 22, 1987. Unseeded Christo van Rensburg won the singles title and earned $50,000 first-prize money.

== Finals ==
=== Singles ===
(South Africa) Christo van Rensburg defeated (United States) Jimmy Connors 6–3, 3–6, 6–1

- It was van Rensburg's only singles title of the year and the first of his career.

=== Doubles ===
(United States) Sherwood Stewart / (Australia) Kim Warwick defeated (United States) Paul Annacone / (South Africa) Christo van Rensburg 2–6, 7–6, 6–4

- It was Stewart's only doubles title of the year and the 53rd and last of his career. It was Warwick's only doubles title of the year and the 26th and last of his career.
