= 1989 Prudential-Bache Securities Classic – Doubles =

Doubles
- 1989 Prudential-Bache Securities Classic

Final
- Champions: (United States) Scott Davis (United States) Tim Pawsat
- Runners-up: (United States) Ken Flach (United States) Robert Seguso
- Score: 7–5, 5–7, 6–4

Details
- Draw: 16
- Seeds: 4

Events
Singles	Doubles
← 1988 ·	Verizon Tennis Challenge	· 1990 →

Guy Forget and Yannick Noah were the defending champions, but none competed this year.

Scott Davis and Tim Pawsat won the title by defeating Ken Flach and Robert Seguso 7–5, 5–7, 6–4 in the final.

== Seeds ==
1. (United States) Ken Flach / (United States) Robert Seguso (final)
2. (n/a)
3. (South Africa) Pieter Aldrich / (South Africa) Danie Visser (semifinals)
4. (United States) Glenn Layendecker / (United States) Todd Witsken (semifinals)

== Draw ==
=== Key ===
- Q = Qualifier
- WC = Wild card
- LL = Lucky loser
- Alt = Alternate
- SE = Special exempt
- PR = Protected ranking
- ITF = ITF entry
- JE = Junior exempt
- w/o = Walkover
- r = Retired
- d = Defaulted
- SR = Special ranking

=== Draw ===
First round
1	(United States) K Flach (United States) R Seguso	6	6
(United States) S Stewart (Australia) K Warwick	4	4
(United States) K Jones (Australia) D Macpherson	6	6
(South Africa) M Kaplan (United States) MV Washington	2	4
3	(South Africa) P Aldrich (South Africa) D Visser	7	7
(United States) P Annacone (New Zealand) K Evernden	5	6
(United States) P Chamberlin (United States) T Wilkison	6	7
(United States) J Arias (United States) R Reneberg	4	6
(South Africa) R Deppe (South Africa) B Talbot	4	7	7
(United States) Edward Ross (United States) J Ross	6	5	5
(United States) L Jensen (United States) D Wheaton	6	3	4
4	(United States) G Layendecker (United States) T Witsken	3	6	6
(United States) S Davis (United States) T Pawsat	6	6
(United States) D Cassidy (United States) B Willenborg	2	1
(Puerto Rico) M Nido (South Africa) M Robertson	6	6
(Sweden) O Malmqvist (Sweden) M Pernfors	4	1

Quarterfinals
1	(United States) K Flach (United States) R Seguso	7	6
(United States) K Jones (Australia) D Macpherson	5	3
3	(South Africa) P Aldrich (South Africa) D Visser	7	7
(United States) P Chamberlin (United States) T Wilkison	6	5
(South Africa) R Deppe (South Africa) B Talbot	6	4
4	(United States) G Layendecker (United States) T Witsken	7	6
(United States) S Davis (United States) T Pawsat	4	6	6
(Puerto Rico) M Nido (South Africa) M Robertson	6	4	1

Semifinals
1	(United States) K Flach (United States) R Seguso	6	4	7
3	(South Africa) P Aldrich (South Africa) D Visser	4	6	5
4	(United States) G Layendecker (United States) T Witsken	6	6	4
(United States) S Davis (United States) T Pawsat	4	7	6

Final
1	(United States) K Flach (United States) R Seguso	5	7	4
(United States) S Davis (United States) T Pawsat	7	5	6
