= 1978 United Bank Tennis Classic – Doubles =

Doubles
- 1978 United Bank Tennis Classic

Final
- Champion: (South Africa) Bob Hewitt (South Africa) Frew McMillan
- Runner-up: (United States) Fred McNair (United States) Sherwood Stewart
- Score: 6–3, 6–2

Details
- Draw: 16
- Seeds: 4

Events
Singles	Doubles
← 1977 ·	Denver Open	· 1979 →

The 1976 United Bank Tennis Classic – Doubles was an event of the 1976 United Bank Tennis Classic men's tennis tournament and was played on indoor carpet courts in Denver, Colorado in the United States, between February 20 and February 26, 1978. The draw consisted of 16 teams of which four were seeded. Colin Dibley and Geoff Masters were the defending doubles champions but did not compete in this edition. First-seeded team of Bob Hewitt and Frew McMillan won the United Bank Tennis Classic doubles title by defeating the third-seeded pairing Fred McNair and Sherwood Stewart in the final, 6–3, 6–2.

== Seeds ==
1. (South Africa) Bob Hewitt / (South Africa) Frew McMillan (champions)
2. (Poland) Wojciech Fibak / (United States) Marty Riessen (first round)
3. (United States) Fred McNair / (United States) Sherwood Stewart (final)
4. (Australia) Colin Dibley / (Australia) Geoff Masters (semifinals)

== Draw ==
=== Key ===
- Q = Qualifier
- WC = Wild card
- LL = Lucky loser
- Alt = Alternate
- SE = Special exempt
- PR = Protected ranking
- ITF = ITF entry
- JE = Junior exempt
- w/o = Walkover
- r = Retired
- d = Defaulted
- SR = Special ranking

First Round
1	(South Africa) Bob Hewitt (South Africa) Frew McMillan	6	6	6
(United States) Arthur Ashe (United States) Stan Smith	7	4	2
(United States) Nick Saviano (United States) John Whitlinger	5	7	7
(United States) Tom Leonard (United States) Mike MacHette	7	6	6
4	(Australia) Colin Dibley (Australia) Geoff Masters	6	6
(United States) Billy Martin (United States) Butch Walts	4	4
(Spain) José Higueras (Spain) Manuel Orantes	6	6
(Australia) Dick Crealy (United States) Van Winitsky	2	4
(Sweden) Jan Norbäck (Sweden) Jan-Eric Palm	6	4
(Australia) Bob Carmichael (United States) Brian Teacher	7	6
(United States) Tim Gullikson (United States) Tom Gullikson	5	6	3
3	(United States) Fred McNair (United States) Sherwood Stewart	7	4	6
(Spain) Aniceto Álvarez (Chile) Álvaro Fillol	5	3
(United States) Bud Cox (South Africa) Cliff Drysdale	7	6
(United Kingdom) John Lloyd (Australia) Kim Warwick	6	6
2	(Poland) Wojciech Fibak (United States) Marty Riessen	4	4

Quarterfinals
1	(South Africa) Bob Hewitt (South Africa) Frew McMillan	7	6
(United States) Nick Saviano (United States) John Whitlinger	6	1
4	(Australia) Colin Dibley (Australia) Geoff Masters	6	6
(Spain) José Higueras (Spain) Manuel Orantes	3	4
(Australia) Bob Carmichael (United States) Brian Teacher	6	6	5
3	(United States) Fred McNair (United States) Sherwood Stewart	7	3	7
(United States) Bud Cox (South Africa) Cliff Drysdale	4	7	6
(United Kingdom) John Lloyd (Australia) Kim Warwick	6	5	7

Semifinals
1	(South Africa) Bob Hewitt (South Africa) Frew McMillan	6	7	6
4	(Australia) Colin Dibley (Australia) Geoff Masters	7	6	3
3	(United States) Fred McNair (United States) Sherwood Stewart	7	2	6
(United Kingdom) John Lloyd (Australia) Kim Warwick	6	6	3

Final
1	(South Africa) Bob Hewitt (South Africa) Frew McMillan	6	6
3	(United States) Fred McNair (United States) Sherwood Stewart	3	2
