= 1983 Dallas Open – Doubles =

Doubles
- 1983 Dallas Open

Final
- Champions: (Nigeria) Nduka Odizor (United States) Van Winitsky
- Runners-up: (United States) Steve Denton (United States) Sherwood Stewart
- Score: 6–3, 7–5

Details
- Draw: 16
- Seeds: 4

Events
Singles	Doubles
- Dallas Open

Nduka Odizor and Van Winitsky won in the final 6–3, 7–5 against Steve Denton and Sherwood Stewart.

== Seeds ==
Champion seeds are indicated in bold text while text in italics indicates the round in which those seeds were eliminated.

1. (United States) Tim Gullikson / (United States) Tom Gullikson (first round)
2. (United States) Steve Denton / (United States) Sherwood Stewart (final)
3. (Australia) John Alexander / (South Africa) Kevin Curren (quarterfinals)
4. (United States) Sandy Mayer / (United States) Ferdi Taygan (semifinals)

== Draw ==
Key

- Q = Qualifier
- WC = Wild card
- LL = Lucky loser
- Alt = Alternate
- ITF = ITF entry
- PR = Protected ranking
- SR = Special ranking
- SE = Special exempt
- JE = Junior exempt
- JR = Junior Accelerator Programme entrant
- CO = College Accelerator Programme entrant
- NG = Next Gen Accelerator Program entrant
- w/o = Walkover
- r = Retired
- d = Defaulted

First round
1	(United States) Tim Gullikson (United States) Tom Gullikson	**6**	3	4
(New Zealand) **C Lewis** (Australia) **P McNamee**	4	**6**	**6**
(Nigeria) **N Odizor** (United States) **V Winitsky**	**6**	6	**6**
(United States) P Annacone (United States) E Korita	4	**7**	3
3	(Australia) **J Alexander** (South Africa) **K Curren**	**6**	**7**
(United States) M Estep (United States) R Meyer	3	5
(United States) **L Bourne** (Australia) **B Dyke**	**6**	**6**
(United Kingdom) J Lloyd (South Africa) D Tarr	2	3
(United States) **T Delatte** (United States) **S Smith**	**7**	**6**
(United States) T Giammalva (United States) S Giammalva Jr.	5	3
(United States) E Fromm (United States) D Gitlin	4	**7**	2
4	(United States) **S Mayer** (United States) **F Taygan**	**6**	6	**6**
(United States) **S Davis** (United States) **B Teacher**	**6**	**6**
(United States) C Hooper (United States) L Stefanki	4	4
(Zimbabwe) A Pattison (United States) B Walts	4	4
2	(United States) **S Denton** (United States) **S Stewart**	**6**	**6**

Quarterfinals
(New Zealand) C Lewis (Australia) P McNamee	6	**6**	4
(Nigeria) **N Odizor** (United States) **V Winitsky**	**7**	3	**6**
3	(Australia) J Alexander (South Africa) K Curren	2	**6**	0
(United States) **L Bourne** (Australia) **B Dyke**	**6**	3	**6**
(United States) T Delatte (United States) S Smith	3	4
4	(United States) **S Mayer** (United States) **F Taygan**	**6**	**6**
(United States) S Davis (United States) B Teacher	**7**	3	2
2	(United States) **S Denton** (United States) **S Stewart**	5	**6**	**6**

Semifinals
(Nigeria) **N Odizor** (United States) **V Winitsky**	**6**	**6**
(United States) L Bourne (Australia) B Dyke	4	4
4	(United States) S Mayer (United States) F Taygan	**7**	4	4
2	(United States) **S Denton** (United States) **S Stewart**	5	**6**	**6**

Final
(Nigeria) **Nduka Odizor** (United States) **Van Winitsky**	**6**	**7**
2	(United States) Steve Denton (United States) Sherwood Stewart	3	5
