= 1987 Paine Webber Classic – Singles =

Singles
- 1987 Paine Webber Classic

Final
- Champion: (South Africa) Christo van Rensburg
- Runner-up: (United States) Jimmy Connors
- Score: 6–3, 3–6, 6–1

Details
- Draw: 32 (3WC/4Q)
- Seeds: 8

Events
Singles	Doubles
← 1986 ·	Verizon Tennis Challenge	· 1988 →

Ivan Lendl was the two-time defending champion, but did not compete this year.

Christo van Rensburg won the title by defeating Jimmy Connors 6–3, 3–6, 6–1 in the final.

== Seeds ==
1. (United States) Jimmy Connors (final)
2. (Ecuador) Andrés Gómez (second round)
3. (United States) Tim Mayotte (semifinals)
4. (United States) Brad Gilbert (semifinals)
5. (United States) Johan Kriek (first round)
6. (United States) Robert Seguso (first round)
7. (United States) Aaron Krickstein (first round)
8. (United States) Tim Wilkison (quarterfinals)

== Draw ==
=== Key ===
- Q = Qualifier
- WC = Wild card
- LL = Lucky loser
- Alt = Alternate
- SE = Special exempt
- PR = Protected ranking
- ITF = ITF entry
- JE = Junior exempt
- w/o = Walkover
- r = Retired
- d = Defaulted
- SR = Special ranking

=== Finals ===
Semifinals
1	(United States) Jimmy Connors	3	6	6
4	(United States) Brad Gilbert	6	4	2
3	(United States) Tim Mayotte	6	6	4
(South Africa) Christo van Rensburg	2	7	6

Final
1	(United States) Jimmy Connors	3	6	1
(South Africa) Christo van Rensburg	6	3	6

=== Top half ===
First round
1	(United States) J Connors	7	6
Q	(New Zealand) K Evernden	6	2
(United States) G Holmes	6	7	7
Q	(United States) H Pfister	7	6	6
(South Africa) E Edwards	4	6	6
(United States) G Donnelly	6	4	1
(United States) D Pate	4	2
8	(United States) T Wilkison	6	6
4	(United States) B Gilbert	6	6
WC	(United States) M Dickson	1	4
(United States) M Anger	6	6
Q	(United States) J Brown	3	4
(France) JP Fleurian	7	2	2
(United States) M Freeman	6	6	6
(United States) T Witsken	6	6
5	(United States) J Kriek	2	2

Second round
1	(United States) J Connors	6	7
(United States) G Holmes	2	6
(South Africa) E Edwards	1	4
8	(United States) T Wilkison	6	6
4	(United States) B Gilbert	6	7
(United States) M Anger	1	6
(United States) M Freeman	6	6	7
(United States) T Witsken	7	1	5

Quarterfinals
1	(United States) J Connors	6	5
8	(United States) T Wilkison	2	2^{r}
4	(United States) B Gilbert	4	6	6
(United States) M Freeman	6	3	1

Semifinals
1	(United States) J Connors	3	6	6
4	(United States) B Gilbert	6	4	2

=== Bottom half ===
First round
6	(United States) R Seguso	1	6	4
(United States) E Teltscher	6	4	6
(United States) P Annacone	6	6
(United States) M Purcell	3	4
WC	(United States) J Ross	4	1
(South Africa) C Steyn	6	6
WC	(United States) J Berger	4	6
3	(United States) T Mayotte	6	7
7	(United States) A Krickstein	3	0
(United States) S Davis	6	6
(South Africa) C van Rensburg	6	6
(United States) S Giammalva Jr.	3	4
(United States) D Rostagno	6	6
(United States) G Layendecker	3	4
Q	(United States) B Pearce	3	3
2	(Ecuador) A Gómez	6	6

Second round
(United States) E Teltscher	6	3	4
(United States) P Annacone	4	6	6
(South Africa) C Steyn	4	5
3	(United States) T Mayotte	6	7
(United States) S Davis	0	1
(South Africa) C van Rensburg	6	6
(United States) D Rostagno	6	6
2	(Ecuador) A Gómez	2	3

Quarterfinals
(United States) P Annacone	1	5
3	(United States) T Mayotte	6	7
(South Africa) C van Rensburg	2	6	7
(United States) D Rostagno	6	1	5

Semifinals
3	(United States) T Mayotte	6	6	4
(South Africa) C van Rensburg	2	7	6
