= 1978 United Bank Tennis Classic – Singles =

Singles
- 1978 United Bank Tennis Classic

Final
- Champion: (United States) Jimmy Connors
- Runner-up: (United States) Stan Smith
- Score: 6–2, 7–6^{(7–2)}

Details
- Draw: 32
- Seeds: 8

Events
Singles	Doubles
← 1977 ·	Denver Open	· 1979 →

The 1976 United Bank Tennis Classic – Singles was an event of the 1976 United Bank Tennis Classic men's tennis tournament and was played on indoor carpet courts in Denver, Colorado in the United States, between February 20 and February 26, 1978. The draw comprised 32 players and eight of them were seeded. Björn Borg was the defending singles champion but did not compete in this edition. First-seeded Jimmy Connors won the United Bank Tennis Classic singles title by defeating fifth-seeded Stan Smith in the final, 6–2, 7–6^{(7–2)}.

== Seeds ==
1. (United States) Jimmy Connors (champion)
2. (Spain) Manuel Orantes (second round)
3. (Withdrew)
4. (Poland) Wojciech Fibak (quarterfinals)
5. (United States) Stan Smith (final)
6. (United States) Tim Gullikson (first round)
7. (United Kingdom) Mark Cox (second round)
8. (South Africa) Cliff Drysdale (second round)

== Draw ==
=== Key ===
- Q = Qualifier
- WC = Wild card
- LL = Lucky loser
- Alt = Alternate
- SE = Special exempt
- PR = Protected ranking
- ITF = ITF entry
- JE = Junior exempt
- w/o = Walkover
- r = Retired
- d = Defaulted
- SR = Special ranking

=== Finals ===
Semifinals
1	(United States) Jimmy Connors	6	6
LL	(Australia) Geoff Masters	2	4
5	(United States) Stan Smith	6	7
(United States) Arthur Ashe	4	5

Final
1	(United States) Jimmy Connors	6	7
5	(United States) Stan Smith	2	6

=== Top half ===
First Round
1	(United States) Jimmy Connors	7	6
(United States) Peter Fleming	6	0
Q	(United States) Van Winitsky	7	6	6
(Mexico) Marcello Lara	6	7	4
(Switzerland) Heinz Günthardt	6	6	7
(United States) Butch Walts	7	2	6
(United States) Nick Saviano	6	6
6	(United States) Tim Gullikson	4	4
LL	(Australia) Geoff Masters	6	7
(Australia) Kim Warwick	4	6
(Australia) Colin Dibley	7	6	6
(United States) Terry Moor	6	7	7
(South Africa) Bob Hewitt	6	3
(United States) Tom Leonard	7	6
(United States) Brian Teacher	1	7	4
7	(United Kingdom) Mark Cox	6	5	6

Second Round
1	(United States) Jimmy Connors	6	6
Q	(United States) Van Winitsky	4	2
(Switzerland) Heinz Günthardt	3	6	6
(United States) Nick Saviano	6	3	7
LL	(Australia) Geoff Masters	3	7	6
(United States) Terry Moor	6	6	3
(United States) Tom Leonard	7	6
7	(United Kingdom) Mark Cox	6	4

Quarterfinals
1	(United States) Jimmy Connors	6	6
(United States) Nick Saviano	2	3
LL	(Australia) Geoff Masters	6	6
(United States) Tom Leonard	2	1

Semifinals
1	(United States) Jimmy Connors	6	6
LL	(Australia) Geoff Masters	2	4

=== Bottom half ===
First Round
5	(United States) Stan Smith	7	6
(United States) Billy Martin	6	4
(Spain) José Higueras	2	4
(United Kingdom) John Lloyd	6	6
Q	(Sweden) Douglas Palm	6	7
Q	(Chile) Álvaro Fillol	4	6
(United States) Tom Gullikson	3	5
4	(Poland) Wojciech Fibak	6	7
8	(South Africa) Cliff Drysdale	2	6	6
Q	(Sweden) Jan Norbäck	6	2	3
(South Africa) Frew McMillan	7	6
(United States) Marty Riessen	6	3
(United States) Arthur Ashe	6	6
(United States) Walter Redondo	3	3
(Australia) Dick Crealy	2	7	4
2	(Spain) Manuel Orantes	6	6	6

Second Round
5	(United States) Stan Smith	6	6
(United Kingdom) John Lloyd	3	4
Q	(Sweden) Douglas Palm	7	4	4
4	(Poland) Wojciech Fibak	6	6	6
8	(South Africa) Cliff Drysdale	5	4
(South Africa) Frew McMillan	7	6
(United States) Arthur Ashe	6	6
2	(Spain) Manuel Orantes	4	3

Quarterfinals
5	(United States) Stan Smith	5	6	7
4	(Poland) Wojciech Fibak	7	4	6
(South Africa) Frew McMillan	3	0
(United States) Arthur Ashe	6	6

Semifinals
5	(United States) Stan Smith	6	7
(United States) Arthur Ashe	4	5
