= 1972 United Bank Classic – Singles =

Singles
- 1972 United Bank Classic

Final
- Champion: (Australia) Rod Laver
- Runner-up: (United States) Marty Riessen
- Score: 4–6, 6–3, 6–4

Details
- Draw: 31
- Seeds: 12

Events
Singles	Doubles
Denver Open	· 1973 →

First-seeded Rod Laver won the men's singles title at the 1972 United Bank Classic tennis tournament.

== Seeds ==
1. (Australia) Rod Laver (champion)
2. (Australia) Ken Rosewall (second round)
3. (Netherlands) Tom Okker (semifinals)
4. (South Africa) Cliff Drysdale (second round)
5. (United States) Arthur Ashe (quarterfinals)
6. (United States) Marty Riessen (final)
7. (United States) Bob Lutz (quarterfinals)
8. (United States) Charlie Pasarell (second round)
9. (Australia) John Newcombe (quarterfinals)
10. (Australia) Roy Emerson (semifinals)
11. (United Kingdom) Roger Taylor (second round)
12. (Australia) John Alexander (quarterfinals)

== Draw ==
=== Key ===
- Q = Qualifier
- WC = Wild card
- LL = Lucky loser
- Alt = Alternate
- SE = Special exempt
- PR = Protected ranking
- ITF = ITF entry
- JE = Junior exempt
- w/o = Walkover
- r = Retired
- d = Defaulted
- SR = Special ranking

=== Finals ===
Semifinals
10	(Australia) Roy Emerson	6	4
6	(United States) Marty Riessen	7	6
2	(Netherlands) Tom Okker	3	6
1	(Australia) Rod Laver	6	7

Final
6	(United States) Marty Riessen	6	3	4
1	(Australia) Rod Laver	4	6	6

=== Top half ===
First round
2	(Australia) Ken Rosewall	6	7
(New Zealand) Brian Fairlie	4	5
10	(Australia) Roy Emerson	7	6
(Australia) Bob Carmichael	5	4
(Socialist Federal Republic of Yugoslavia) Niki Pilić	6	5
(Australia) Allan Stone	7	7
7	(United States) Bob Lutz	2	7	6
(United States) Jeff Borowiak	6	5	3
6	(United States) Marty Riessen	6	6
(United States) Frank Froehling	4	2
(Australia) Fred Stolle	6	6
(Australia) Bill Bowrey	3	4
9	(Australia) John Newcombe	6	6
(United Kingdom) Mark Cox	3	2
4	(South Africa) Cliff Drysdale	7	6
(Egypt) Ismail El Shafei	5	2

Second round
2	(Australia) Ken Rosewall	6	7	6
10	(Australia) Roy Emerson	7	6	4
(Australia) Allan Stone	5	7	3
7	(United States) Bob Lutz	7	6	6
6	(United States) Marty Riessen	6	6
(Australia) Fred Stolle	4	4
9	(Australia) John Newcombe	6	6	7
4	(South Africa) Cliff Drysdale	3	7	5

Quarterfinals
10	(Australia) Roy Emerson	6	3	6
7	(United States) Bob Lutz	2	6	1
6	(United States) Marty Riessen	5	7	6
9	(Australia) John Newcombe	7	6	3

Semifinals
10	(Australia) Roy Emerson	6	4
6	(United States) Marty Riessen	7	6

=== Bottom half ===
First round
3	(Netherlands) Tom Okker	6	6
(Australia) Tony Roche	1	3
11	(United Kingdom) Roger Taylor	3	6	7
(United Kingdom) Graham Stilwell	6	4	6
5	(United States) Arthur Ashe	6	6	7
(United States) Tom Leonard	7	4	6
8	(United States) Charlie Pasarell	6	6	7
(South Africa) Bob Maud	7	3	6
12	(Australia) John Alexander	7	6
(Australia) Ray Ruffels	5	4
(United States) Cliff Richey	7	7
(Australia) Terry Addison	6	5
(United States) Roy Barth	7	0	4
1	(Australia) Rod Laver	5	6	6

Second round
3	(Netherlands) Tom Okker	7	6	6
(Australia) Owen Davidson	5	7	3
11	(United Kingdom) Roger Taylor	6	7	4
5	(United States) Arthur Ashe	7	5	6
8	(United States) Charlie Pasarell	4	7	3
12	(Australia) John Alexander	6	6	6
(United States) Cliff Richey	4	4
1	(Australia) Rod Laver	6	6

Quarterfinals
3	(Netherlands) Tom Okker	7	6
5	(United States) Arthur Ashe	5	3
12	(Australia) John Alexander	4	3
1	(Australia) Rod Laver	6	6

Semifinals
3	(Netherlands) Tom Okker	3	6
1	(Australia) Rod Laver	6	7
