= 1983 Dallas Open – Singles =

Singles
- 1983 Dallas Open

Final
- Champion: (Ecuador) Andrés Gómez
- Runner-up: (United States) Brian Teacher
- Score: 6–7, 6–1, 6–1

Details
- Draw: 32
- Seeds: 8

Events
Singles	Doubles
- Dallas Open

Andrés Gómez won in the final, 6–7, 6–1, 6–1, against Brian Teacher.

== Seeds ==
A champion seed is indicated in bold text while text in italics indicates the round in which that seed was eliminated.

1. (United States) Jimmy Connors (quarterfinals)
2. (United States) Gene Mayer (quarterfinals)
3. (United States) Steve Denton (first round)
4. (Ecuador) **Andrés Gómez (champion)**
5. (United States) Sandy Mayer (semifinals)
6. (United States) Brian Teacher (final)
7. (New Zealand) Chris Lewis (quarterfinals)
8. (Australia) John Fitzgerald (quarterfinals)

== Draw ==
Key

- Q = Qualifier
- WC = Wild card
- LL = Lucky loser
- Alt = Alternate
- ITF = ITF entry
- PR = Protected ranking
- SR = Special ranking
- SE = Special exempt
- JE = Junior exempt
- JR = Junior Accelerator Programme entrant
- CO = College Accelerator Programme entrant
- NG = Next Gen Accelerator Program entrant
- w/o = Walkover
- r = Retired
- d = Defaulted

First round
1	(United States) **J Connors**	**6**	**6**
(United States) T Giammalva	4	4
(United States) S Giammalva Jr.	6	**6**	5
Q	(United States) **V Winitsky**	**7**	3	**7**
(Canada) **G Michibata**	**7**	**7**
(United States) D Gitlin	5	5
(United States) L Bourne	1	2
5	(United States) **S Mayer**	**6**	**6**
4	(Ecuador) **A Gómez**	**6**	**7**
(United States) M Bauer	4	6
Q	(Australia) B Dyke	3	4
(United States) **E Korita**	**6**	**6**
Q	(United States) E Adams	3	**6**	5
(United States) **Tom Gullikson**	**6**	4	**7**
(Australia) J Alexander	4	5
7	(New Zealand) **C Lewis**	**6**	**7**
8	(Australia) **J Fitzgerald**	**6**	3	**6**
Q	(India) R Krishnan	4	**6**	4
(United States) **R Tanner**	**6**	6	**6**
(United States) J Lapidus	3	**7**	1
(United States) S Smith	6	**6**	5
(United States) **S Davis**	**7**	3	**7**
(United States) **Tim Gullikson**	**6**	**7**
3	(United States) S Denton	4	6	**6**
6	(United States) **B Teacher**	4	**6**	**6**
(United States) E Fromm	**6**	1	3
(Nigeria) **N Odizor**	1	**6**	**7**
(Australia) P McNamee	**6**	3	6
(United States) **R Harmon**	**6**	**6**
(South Africa) D Tarr	2	3
(United States) C Hooper	**7**	6	0
2	(United States) **G Mayer**	6	**7**	**6**

Second round
1	(United States) **J Connors**	**6**	**6**
Q	(United States) V Winitsky	1	4
(Canada) G Michibata	3	**7**	2
5	(United States) **S Mayer**	**6**	5	**6**
4	(Ecuador) **A Gómez**	**6**	**7**
(United States) E Korita	2	6
(United States) Tom Gullikson	5	3
7	(New Zealand) **C Lewis**	**7**	**6**
8	(Australia) **J Fitzgerald**	**6**	**6**
(United States) R Tanner	1	4
(United States) **S Davis**	6	**7**	**6**
(United States) Tim Gullikson	**7**	6	3
6	(United States) **B Teacher**	**6**	**6**
(Nigeria) N Odizor	4	2
(United States) R Harmon	5	1
2	(United States) **G Mayer**	**7**	**6**

Quarterfinals
1	(United States) J Connors	4	5
5	(United States) **S Mayer**	**6**	**7**
4	(Ecuador) **A Gómez**	**7**	**7**
7	(New Zealand) C Lewis	6	6
8	(Australia) J Fitzgerald	6	1
(United States) **S Davis**	**7**	**6**
6	(United States) **B Teacher**	**6**	**6**
2	(United States) G Mayer	4	3

Semifinals
5	(United States) S Mayer	1	2
4	(Ecuador) **A Gómez**	**6**	**6**
(United States) S Davis	4	**6**	3
6	(United States) **B Teacher**	**6**	3	**6**

Final
4	(Ecuador) **Andrés Gómez**	6	**6**	**6**
6	(United States) Brian Teacher	**7**	1	1
