= 1986 Volvo Tennis Los Angeles – Doubles =

Doubles
- 1986 Volvo Tennis Los Angeles

Final
- Champions: (Sweden) Stefan Edberg (Sweden) Anders Järryd
- Runners-up: (United States) Peter Fleming (United States) John McEnroe
- Score: 3–6, 7–5, 7–6^{(9–7)}

Events
Singles	Doubles
← 1985 ·	Los Angeles Open	· 1987 →

Scott Davis and Robert Van't Hof were the defending champions, but faced each other in this edition, with different partners. Davis, teaming up with David Pate, defeated Van't Hof and Andy Kohlberg in the first round. Davis and Pate were eliminated in quarterfinals to Christo Steyn and Danie Visser.

Stefan Edberg and Anders Järryd won the title by defeating Peter Fleming and John McEnroe 3–6, 7–5, 7–6^{(9–7)} in the final.

== Seeds ==
1. (Sweden) Stefan Edberg / (Sweden) Anders Järryd (champions)
2. (United States) Paul Annacone / (South Africa) Christo van Rensburg (semifinals)
3. (United States) Scott Davis / (United States) David Pate (quarterfinals)
4. (United States) Brad Gilbert / (United States) Vincent Van Patten (quarterfinals)

== Draw ==
=== Key ===
- Q = Qualifier
- WC = Wild card
- LL = Lucky loser
- Alt = Alternate
- SE = Special exempt
- PR = Protected ranking
- ITF = ITF entry
- JE = Junior exempt
- w/o = Walkover
- r = Retired
- d = Defaulted
- SR = Special ranking

=== Draw ===
First round
1	(Sweden) S Edberg (Sweden) A Järryd	6	6
(United States) M De Palmer (United States) G Donnelly	3	3
(United States) K Flach (United States) S Giammalva Jr.	4	3
(United States) C Hooper (United States) M Leach	6	6
3	(United States) S Davis (United States) D Pate	7	6
(United States) A Kohlberg (United States) R Van't Hof	5	2
(United States) S Denton (United Kingdom) J Lloyd	4	5
(South Africa) C Steyn (South Africa) D Visser	6	7
(United States) P Fleming (United States) J McEnroe	6	6
(Australia) B Dyke (Australia) L Warder	1	0
(South Africa) G Muller (United States) T Nelson	4	3
4	(United States) B Gilbert (United States) V Van Patten	6	6
(United States) M Mitchell (United States) S Stewart	3	2
WC	(India) V Amritraj (Australia) P Cash	6	6
(South Africa) E Edwards (United States) B Teacher	1	5
2	(United States) P Annacone (South Africa) C van Rensburg	6	7

Quarterfinals
1	(Sweden) S Edberg (Sweden) A Järryd	6	6
(United States) C Hooper (United States) M Leach	4	2
3	(United States) S Davis (United States) D Pate	4	6
(South Africa) C Steyn (South Africa) D Visser	6	7
(United States) P Fleming (United States) J McEnroe	6	4	6
4	(United States) B Gilbert (United States) V Van Patten	1	6	2
WC	(India) V Amritraj (Australia) P Cash
2	(United States) P Annacone (South Africa) C van Rensburg	w/o

Semifinals
1	(Sweden) S Edberg (Sweden) A Järryd	6	6
(South Africa) C Steyn (South Africa) D Visser	4	3
(United States) P Fleming (United States) J McEnroe	7	7
2	(United States) P Annacone (South Africa) C van Rensburg	6	6

Final
1	(Sweden) S Edberg (Sweden) A Järryd	3	7	7^{9}
(United States) P Fleming (United States) J McEnroe	6	5	6^{7}
