= 1978 United Bank Tennis Classic =

- Date: February 20–26
- Edition: 7th
- Category: Grand Prix
- Draw: 32S / 16D
- Prize money: $125,000
- Surface: Carpet / indoor
- Location: Denver, Colorado, U.S.
- Venue: Denver Auditorium Arena

Champions

Singles
- (United States) Jimmy Connors

Doubles
- (South Africa) Bob Hewitt / (South Africa) Frew McMillan
- Denver Open

The 1978 United Bank Tennis Classic, also known as the Denver WCT, was a men's tennis tournament played on indoor carpet courts at the Denver Auditorium Arena in Denver, Colorado in the United States that was part of the 1978 Grand Prix circuit. It was the seventh edition of the tournament and took place from February 20 through February 26, 1978. First-seeded Jimmy Connors won the singles title, his third at the event after 1975 and 1976, and earned $25,000 first-prize money as well as 125 Grand Prix ranking points.

== Finals ==
=== Singles ===
(United States) Jimmy Connors defeated (United States) Stan Smith 6–2, 7–6^{(7–2)}

- It was Connors' 2nd singles title of the year and the 63rd of his career.

=== Doubles ===
(South Africa) Bob Hewitt / (South Africa) Frew McMillan defeated (United States) Fred McNair / (United States) Sherwood Stewart 6–3, 6–2
