= 1989 Prudential-Bache Securities Classic – Singles =

Singles
- 1989 Prudential-Bache Securities Classic

Final
- Champion: (United States) Andre Agassi
- Runner-up: (United States) Brad Gilbert
- Score: 6–2, 6–1

Details
- Draw: 32 (3WC/4Q/1LL)
- Seeds: 8

Events
Singles	Doubles
← 1988 ·	Verizon Tennis Challenge	· 1990 →

Andrei Chesnokov was the defending champion but chose to compete at Basel during the same week, losing at the first round.

Andre Agassi won the title by defeating Brad Gilbert 6–2, 6–1 in the final.

== Seeds ==
1. (United States) Brad Gilbert (final)
2. (United States) Andre Agassi (champion)
3. (Spain) Emilio Sánchez (quarterfinals)
4. (n/a)
5. (Peru) Jaime Yzaga (semifinals)
6. (Sweden) Mikael Pernfors (second round)
7. (United States) Jim Grabb (first round, retired)
8. (Canada) Andrew Sznajder (first round)

== Draw ==
=== Key ===
- Q = Qualifier
- WC = Wild card
- LL = Lucky loser
- Alt = Alternate
- SE = Special exempt
- PR = Protected ranking
- ITF = ITF entry
- JE = Junior exempt
- w/o = Walkover
- r = Retired
- d = Defaulted
- SR = Special ranking

=== Finals ===
Semifinals
1	(United States) Brad Gilbert	6	6
(United States) Jimmy Brown	3	1
5	(Peru) Jaime Yzaga	1	1
2	(United States) Andre Agassi	6	6

Final
1	(United States) Brad Gilbert	2	1
2	(United States) Andre Agassi	6	6

=== Top half ===
First round
1	(United States) B Gilbert	6	6
(United States) P Chamberlin	2	2
(United States) R Seguso	3	0
(United States) R Reneberg	6	6
(United States) D Cassidy	6	6	4
Q	(United States) K Jones	3	7	6
(United States) J Arias	1	6	6
8	(Canada) A Sznajder	6	4	3
LL	(United States) P Johnson	2	6	1
Q	(Puerto Rico) M Nido	6	3	6
(United States) P Annacone	4	3
(New Zealand) K Evernden	6	6
(Canada) M Wostenholme	3	2
(United States) J Brown	6	6
(South Africa) D Visser	2	6
6/WC	(Sweden) M Pernfors	6	7

Second round
1	(United States) B Gilbert	7	2	6
(United States) R Reneberg	6	6	3
Q	(United States) K Jones	3	1
(United States) J Arias	6	6
Q	(Puerto Rico) M Nido	2	6	6
(New Zealand) K Evernden	6	4	1
(United States) J Brown	6	6
6/WC	(Sweden) M Pernfors	2	0

Quarterfinals
1	(United States) B Gilbert	6	6
(United States) J Arias	3	1
Q	(Puerto Rico) M Nido	4	0
(United States) J Brown	6	6

Semifinals
1	(United States) B Gilbert	6	6
(United States) J Brown	3	1

=== Bottom half ===
First round
5	(Peru) J Yzaga	7	6
(United States) S Davis	5	1
(Sweden) T Högstedt	7	6
(United States) T Wilkison	6	1
Q	(South Africa) R Deppe	6	4	3
WC	(United States) J Ross	3	6	6
(South Africa) P Aldrich	1	4
3	(Spain) E Sánchez	6	6
7	(United States) J Grabb	3	0^{r}
(United States) G Layendecker	6	1
WC	(United States) T Ho	4	2
(United States) D Wheaton	6	6
Q	(United States) MV Washington	4	6	3
(United States) T Witsken	6	3	6
(Venezuela) N Pereira	3	3
2	(United States) A Agassi	6	6

Second round
5	(Peru) J Yzaga	6	7
(Sweden) T Högstedt	4	6
WC	(United States) J Ross	6	2	6
3	(Spain) E Sánchez	3	6	7
(United States) G Layendecker	4	3
(United States) D Wheaton	6	6
(United States) T Witsken	5	3
2	(United States) A Agassi	7	6

Quarterfinals
5	(Peru) J Yzaga	6	4	6
3	(Spain) E Sánchez	4	6	2
(United States) D Wheaton	1	4
2	(United States) A Agassi	6	6

Semifinals
5	(Peru) J Yzaga	1	1
2	(United States) A Agassi	6	6
