= 1985 Volvo Tennis Los Angeles – Doubles =

Doubles
- 1985 Volvo Tennis Los Angeles

Final
- Champions: (United States) Scott Davis (United States) Robert Van't Hof
- Runners-up: (United States) Paul Annacone (South Africa) Christo van Rensburg
- Score: 6–3, 7–6

Details
- Draw: 16
- Seeds: 4

Events
Singles	Doubles
← 1984 ·	Los Angeles Open	· 1986 →

Ken Flach and Robert Seguso were the defending champions, but lost in the quarterfinals to Scott Davis and Robert Van't Hof.

Davis and Van't Hof won the title by defeating Paul Annacone and Christo van Rensburg 6–3, 7–6 in the final.

== Seeds ==
1. (United States) Ken Flach / (United States) Robert Seguso (quarterfinals)
2. (United States) Sherwood Stewart / (Australia) Kim Warwick (first round)
3. (United States) Paul Annacone / (South Africa) Christo van Rensburg (final)
4. (Australia) John Fitzgerald / (United States) Peter Fleming (semifinals)

== Draw ==
=== Key ===
- Q = Qualifier
- WC = Wild card
- LL = Lucky loser
- Alt = Alternate
- SE = Special exempt
- PR = Protected ranking
- ITF = ITF entry
- JE = Junior exempt
- w/o = Walkover
- r = Retired
- d = Defaulted
- SR = Special ranking

=== Draw ===
First round
1	(United States) K Flach (United States) R Seguso	4	6	6
(South Africa) E Edwards (South Africa) D Visser	6	4	3
(United States) D Dowlen (United States) B Gilbert	3	6	6
(United States) S Davis (United States) R Van't Hof	6	3	7
4	(Australia) J FItzgerald (United States) P Fleming	6	4	6
(United States) M De Palmer (United States) G Donnelly	4	6	0
(United States) J Arias (United States) V Van Patten	6	6	6
(United States) D Gitlin (Australia) D Graham	2	7	3
(United States) M Leach (United States) B Walts	6	6
(United States) M Dickson (United States) T Wilkison	7	7
(Australia) B Dyke (United States) C Hooper	3	6
3	(United States) P Annacone (South Africa) C van Rensburg	6	7
(United States) T Delatte (United States) C Dunk	4	7	6
(United States) M Davis (United States) M Mitchell	6	6	2
(India) V Amritraj (United Kingdom) J Lloyd	7	7
2	(United States) S Stewart (Australia) K Warwick	6	6

Quarterfinals
1	(United States) K Flach (United States) R Seguso	6	6
(United States) S Davis (United States) R Van't Hof	7	7
4	(Australia) J FItzgerald (United States) P Fleming	5	6	7
(United States) J Arias (United States) V Van Patten	7	3	6
(United States) M Dickson (United States) T Wilkison	6	4
3	(United States) P Annacone (South Africa) C van Rensburg	7	6
(United States) T Delatte (United States) C Dunk	1	3
(India) V Amritraj (United Kingdom) J Lloyd	6	6

Semifinals
(United States) S Davis (United States) R Van't Hof	5	7	7
4	(Australia) J FItzgerald (United States) P Fleming	7	5	6
3	(United States) P Annacone (South Africa) C van Rensburg	7	6
(India) V Amritraj (United Kingdom) J Lloyd	6	3

Final
(United States) S Davis (United States) R Van't Hof	6	7
3	(United States) P Annacone (South Africa) C van Rensburg	3	6
