= 1989 Prudential-Bache Securities Classic =

- Date: October 2–8
- Edition: 5th
- Category: Grand Prix (Super Series)
- Draw: 32S / 16D
- Prize money: $297,500
- Surface: Hard / outdoor
- Location: Orlando, Florida, U.S.

Champions

Singles
- (United States) Andre Agassi

Doubles
- (United States) Scott Davis / (United States) Tim Pawsat
← 1988 ·	Prudential-Bache Securities Classic	· 1990 →

The 1989 Prudential-Bache Securities Classic was a men's tennis tournament played on outdoor hard courts in Orlando, Florida, United States that was part of the Super Series of the 1989 Grand Prix circuit. It was the fifth edition of the tournament and took place from October 2 through October 8, 1989. Second-seeded Andre Agassi won the singles title and earned $59,500 first-prize money.

== Finals ==
=== Singles ===
(United States) Andre Agassi defeated (United States) Brad Gilbert 6–2, 6–1

- It was Agassi's 1st singles title of the year and the 8th of his career.

=== Doubles ===
(United States) Scott Davis / (United States) Tim Pawsat defeated (United States) Ken Flach / (United States) Robert Seguso 7–5, 5–7, 6–4
