= 1986 Volvo Tennis Los Angeles =

- Date: September 15–21
- Edition: 60th
- Category: Grand Prix
- Draw: 32S / 16D
- Prize money: $250,000
- Surface: Hard / outdoor
- Location: Los Angeles, California, U.S.
- Venue: Los Angeles Tennis Center

Champions

Singles
- (United States) John McEnroe

Doubles
- (Sweden) Stefan Edberg / (Sweden) Anders Järryd
← 1985 ·	Pacific Southwest Open	· 1987 →

The 1986 Volvo Tennis Los Angeles was a men's tennis tournament played on outdoor hard courts at the Los Angeles Tennis Center in Los Angeles, California in the United States that was part of the 1986 Volvo Grand Prix circuit. It was the 60th edition of the Pacific Southwest tournament and was held from September 15 through September 21, 1986. Sixth-seeded John McEnroe won the singles title, his second at the event after 1981, and the corresponding $50,000 first-prize money.

== Finals ==
=== Singles ===
(United States) John McEnroe defeated (Sweden) Stefan Edberg 6–2, 6–3

- It was McEnroe's 1st singles title of the year and the 68th of his career.

=== Doubles ===
(Sweden) Stefan Edberg / (Sweden) Anders Järryd defeated (United States) Peter Fleming / (United States) John McEnroe 3–6, 7–5, 7–6^{(9–7)}

== See also ==
- 1986 Virginia Slims of Los Angeles – women's tournament
