= 1985 Volvo Tennis Los Angeles =

- Date: September 16–22
- Edition: 59th
- Category: Grand Prix (Super Series)
- Draw: 32S / 16D
- Prize money: $250,000
- Surface: Hard / outdoor
- Location: Los Angeles, California, U.S.
- Venue: Los Angeles Tennis Center

Champions

Singles
- (United States) Paul Annacone

Doubles
- (United States) Scott Davis / (United States) Robert Van't Hof
← 1984 ·	Pacific Southwest Open	· 1986 →

The 1985 Volvo Tennis Los Angeles was a men's tennis tournament played on outdoor hard courts at the Los Angeles Tennis Center in Los Angeles, California in the United States that was part of the Super Series of the 1985 Volvo Grand Prix circuit. It was the 59th edition of the Pacific Southwest tournament and was held from September 16 through September 22, 1985. Eighth-seeded Paul Annacone won the singles title and the corresponding $50,000 first-prize money. Defending champion Jimmy Connors could not participate due to a suspension for receiving too many fines.

== Finals ==
=== Singles ===
(United States) Paul Annacone defeated (Sweden) Stefan Edberg 7–6^{(7–5)}, 6–7^{(8–10)}, 7–6^{(7–4)}

- It was Annacone's first singles title of his career.

=== Doubles ===
(United States) Scott Davis / (United States) Robert Van't Hof defeated (United States) Paul Annacone / (South Africa) Christo van Rensburg 6–3, 7–6

== See also ==
- 1985 Virginia Slims of Los Angeles – women's tournament
