= 1984 Virginia Slims of Denver =

- Date: January 16–22
- Edition: 5th
- Draw: 32S / 16D
- Prize money: $50,000
- Surface: Hard / indoor
- Location: Denver, Colorado, US

Champions

Singles
- (United States) Mary-Lou Daniels

Doubles
- (Netherlands) Marcella Mesker / (United Kingdom) Anne Hobbs
← 1975 ·	Virginia Slims of Denver	· 1985 →

The 1984 Virginia Slims of Denver was a women's tennis tournament played on indoor hard courts in Denver, Colorado in the United States that was part of the 1983 Virginia Slims World Championship Series. The tournament was held from January 16 through January 22, 1984. Unseeded Mary-Lou Daniels won the singles title.

== Finals ==
=== Singles ===
(United States) Mary-Lou Daniels defeated (United States) Kim Sands 6–1, 6–1

- It was Daniels' 1st title of the year and the 4th of her career.

=== Doubles ===
(Netherlands) Marcella Mesker / (United Kingdom) Anne Hobbs defeated (United States) Sherry Acker / (United States) Candy Reynolds 6–2, 6–3

- It was Mesker's 1st title of the year and the 3rd of her career. It was Hobbs' 1st title of the year and the 7th of her career.
