= 1985 Volvo Tennis Los Angeles – Singles =

Singles
- 1985 Volvo Tennis Los Angeles

Final
- Champion: (United States) Paul Annacone
- Runner-up: (Sweden) Stefan Edberg
- Score: 7–6^{(7–5)}, 6–7^{(8–10)}, 7–6^{(7–4)}

Details
- Draw: 32 (3WC/4Q)
- Seeds: 8

Events
Singles	Doubles
← 1984 ·	Los Angeles Open	· 1986 →

Jimmy Connors was the defending champion but could not compete due to a 3-week suspension, after being fined at the US Open during the previous week.

Paul Annacone won the title by defeating Stefan Edberg 7–6^{(7–5)}, 6–7^{(8–10)}, 7–6^{(7–4)} in the final.

== Seeds ==
1. (United States) John McEnroe (semifinals, withdrew)
2. (Sweden) Stefan Edberg (final)
3. (United States) Scott Davis (quarterfinals)
4. (United States) Johan Kriek (semifinals)
5. (United States) Brad Gilbert (quarterfinals)
6. (United States) David Pate (first round)
7. (United States) Jimmy Arias (quarterfinals)
8. (United States) Paul Annacone (champion)

== Draw ==
=== Key ===
- Q = Qualifier
- WC = Wild card
- LL = Lucky loser
- Alt = Alternate
- SE = Special exempt
- PR = Protected ranking
- ITF = ITF entry
- JE = Junior exempt
- w/o = Walkover
- r = Retired
- d = Defaulted
- SR = Special ranking

=== Finals ===
Semifinals
1	(United States) John McEnroe
8	(United States) Paul Annacone	w/o
4/WC	(United States) Johan Kriek	2	3
2	(Sweden) Stefan Edberg	6	6

Final
8	(United States) Paul Annacone	7^{7}	6^{8}	7^{7}
2	(Sweden) Stefan Edberg	6^{5}	7^{10}	6^{4}

=== Top half ===
First round
1	(United States) J McEnroe	6	6
(India) V Amritraj	2	0
(United States) K Flach	3	7	6
(United States) J Sadri	6	5	3
(United Kingdom) J Lloyd	6	6	6
(United States) T Moor	7	4	0
Q	(United States) M Freeman	6	2
5	(United States) B Gilbert	7	6
3	(United States) S Davis	6	7
(United States) M Flur	2	6
(Israel) S Perkiss	6	4
(United States) B Schultz	7	6
WC	(United States) B Teacher	4	6	3
(United States) V Van Patten	6	2	6
WC	(United States) D Goldie	1	4
8	(United States) P Annacone	6	6

Second round
1	(United States) J McEnroe	6	6
(United States) K Flach	3	4
(United Kingdom) J Lloyd	5	3
5	(United States) B Gilbert	7	6
3	(United States) S Davis	6	6
(United States) B Schultz	2	2
(United States) V Van Patten	6	3
8	(United States) P Annacone	7	6

Quarterfinals
1	(United States) J McEnroe	4	6	6
5	(United States) B Gilbert	6	0	3
3	(United States) S Davis	4	2
8	(United States) P Annacone	6	6

Semifinals
1	(United States) J McEnroe
8	(United States) P Annacone	w/o

=== Bottom half ===
First round
7	(United States) J Arias	6	5	6
(Australia) J Fitzgerald	4	7	4
(United States) M Leach	6	7
Q	(United States) B Dickinson	4	5
Q	(United States) T Cain	2	5
(United States) T Wilkison	6	7
(United States) B Green	4	5
4/WC	(United States) J Kriek	6	7
6	(United States) D Pate	6	4
(United States) L Stefanki	7	6
(United States) M De Palmer	3	6
(India) R Krishnan	6	7
(United States) P Fleming	2	4
Q	(United States) B Pearce	6	6
(United States) M Dickson	6	5	4
2	(Sweden) S Edberg	4	7	6

Second round
7	(United States) J Arias	7	7
(United States) M Leach	5	6
(United States) T Wilkison	7	6	2
4/WC	(United States) J Kriek	6	7	6
(United States) L Stefanki	4	1
(India) R Krishnan	6	6
Q	(United States) B Pearce	3	4
2	(Sweden) S Edberg	6	6

Quarterfinals
7	(United States) J Arias	6	5	6
4/WC	(United States) J Kriek	2	7	7
(India) R Krishnan	2	4
2	(Sweden) S Edberg	6	6

Semifinals
4/WC	(United States) J Kriek	2	3
2	(Sweden) S Edberg	6	6
