= 1973 Denver WCT =

- Date: April 23–30
- Edition: 2nd
- Category: World Championship Tennis
- Draw: 32S / 16D
- Prize money: $50,000
- Surface: Carpet / indoor
- Location: Denver, Colorado, U.S.

Champions

Singles
- (United Kingdom) Mark Cox

Doubles
- (United States) Arthur Ashe / (United States) Roscoe Tanner
← 1972 ·	Denver WCT	· 1974 →

The 1973 Denver WCT, also known as the 1973 United Bank Tennis Classic for sponsorship reasons, was the second edition of the tennis event. It was held on indoor carpet courts in Denver, Colorado. The tournament was held between the April 23 and April 30, 1973. The tournament was part of the World Championship Tennis tour, and was part of the Group B circuit. As a result the defending champions Rod Laver, of the doubles and singles, along with his doubles partner Roy Emerson, were ineligible to compete. Ninth-seeded Mark Cox won the singles title.

== Finals ==
=== Singles ===
(United Kingdom) Mark Cox defeated (United States) Arthur Ashe 6–1, 6–1

=== Doubles ===
(United States) Arthur Ashe / (United States) Roscoe Tanner defeated (Netherlands) Tom Okker / (United States) Marty Riessen 3–6, 6–3, 7–6

== See also ==
- 1973 Virginia Slims of Denver
