= 1986 Paine Webber Classic – Doubles =

Doubles
- 1986 Paine Webber Classic

Final
- Champions: (Ecuador) Andrés Gómez (Czechoslovakia) Ivan Lendl
- Runners-up: (Australia) Peter Doohan (Australia) Paul McNamee
- Score: 7–5, 6–4

Details
- Draw: 16
- Seeds: 4

Events
Singles	Doubles
- Paine Webber Classic

Ken Flach and Robert Seguso were the defending champions but lost in the first round to Peter Doohan and Paul McNamee.

Andrés Gómez and Ivan Lendl won in the final 7–5, 6–4 against Doohan and McNamee.

== Seeds ==
1. (United States) Ken Flach / (United States) Robert Seguso (first round)
2. (United States) Scott Davis / (United States) David Pate (first round)
3. (United States) Peter Fleming / (South Africa) Christo van Rensburg (first round)
4. (United States) Brad Gilbert / (United States) Vince Van Patten (semifinals)

== Draw ==
Key

- Q = Qualifier
- WC = Wild card
- LL = Lucky loser
- Alt = Alternate
- ITF = ITF entry
- PR = Protected ranking
- SR = Special ranking
- SE = Special exempt
- JE = Junior exempt
- JR = Junior Accelerator Programme entrant
- CO = College Accelerator Programme entrant
- NG = Next Gen Accelerator Program entrant
- w/o = Walkover
- r = Retired
- d = Defaulted

First round
1	(United States) K Flach (United States) R Seguso	2	6	6
(Australia) P Doohan (Australia) P McNamee	6	3	7
(United States) Tim Gullikson (United States) Tom Gullikson	6	7
(United States) S Giammalva Jr. (South Africa) D Visser	4	6
4	(United States) B Gilbert (United States) V Van Patten	5	6	7
(United States) S Stewart (United States) T Wilkison	7	4	6
(United States) A Kohlberg (United States) R Van't Hof	4	6	7
(United States) C Dunk (United States) S Meister	6	3	5
(United States) J Kriek (United Kingdom) J Lloyd	6	7
(South Africa) E Edwards (Paraguay) F González	3	5
(United States) M Robertson (United States) T Warneke	6	7
3	(United States) P Fleming (South Africa) C van Rensburg	4	6
(United States) J Arias (United States) A Krickstein	7	7
(United States) M Leach (United States) E Teltscher	6	6
(Ecuador) A Gómez (Czechoslovakia) I Lendl	6	6	7
2	(United States) S Davis (United States) D Pate	2	7	6

Quarterfinals
(Australia) P Doohan (Australia) P McNamee	6	6
(United States) Tim Gullikson (United States) Tom Gullikson	4	1
4	(United States) B Gilbert (United States) V Van Patten	4	6	6
(United States) A Kohlberg (United States) R Van't Hof	6	3	4
(United States) J Kriek (United Kingdom) J Lloyd	3	2
(United States) M Robertson (United States) T Warneke	6	6
(United States) J Arias (United States) A Krickstein	6	1
(Ecuador) A Gómez (Czechoslovakia) I Lendl	7	6

Semifinals
(Australia) P Doohan (Australia) P McNamee	7	6
4	(United States) B Gilbert (United States) V Van Patten	6	0
(United States) M Robertson (United States) T Warneke	4	1
(Ecuador) A Gómez (Czechoslovakia) I Lendl	6	6

Final
(Australia) P Doohan (Australia) P McNamee	5	4
(Ecuador) A Gómez (Czechoslovakia) I Lendl	7	6
