= 1986 Volvo Tennis Los Angeles – Singles =

Singles
- 1986 Volvo Tennis Los Angeles

Final
- Champion: (United States) John McEnroe
- Runner-up: (Sweden) Stefan Edberg
- Score: 6–2, 6–3

Details
- Draw: 32 (4Q / 3WC)
- Seeds: 8

Events
| Singles | Doubles |
| ← 1985 · | Los Angeles Open | · 1987 → |

Paul Annacone was the defending champion, but lost in the first round to Jaime Yzaga.

John McEnroe won the title by defeating Stefan Edberg 6–2, 6–3 in the final.

== Seeds ==
1. (Sweden) Stefan Edberg (final)
2. (United States) Brad Gilbert (semifinals)
3. (United States) Tim Mayotte (first round)
4. (Sweden) Anders Järryd (first round)
5. (United States) Paul Annacone (first round)
6. (United States) John McEnroe (champion)
7. (United States) Jimmy Arias (first round)
8. (United States) Aaron Krickstein (second round)

== Draw ==
=== Key ===
- Q = Qualifier
- WC = Wild card
- LL = Lucky loser
- Alt = Alternate
- SE = Special exempt
- PR = Protected ranking
- ITF = ITF entry
- JE = Junior exempt
- w/o = Walkover
- r = Retired
- d = Defaulted
- SR = Special ranking

=== Finals ===
Semifinals
1 | (Sweden) Stefan Edberg | 6 | 6
(Sweden) Peter Lundgren | 4 | 3
6 | (United States) John McEnroe | 6 | 3 | 6
2 | (United States) Brad Gilbert | 1 | 6 | 3

Final
1 | (Sweden) Stefan Edberg | 2 | 3
6 | (United States) John McEnroe | 6 | 6

=== Top half ===
First round
1 | (Sweden) S Edberg | 7 | 4 | 6
Q | (United States) S Giammalva Jr. | 5 | 6 | 3
(United States) M Davis | 7 | 1 | 6
(Australia) B Dyke | 6 | 6 | 7
Q | (United States) D Rostagno | 6 | 6
(United States) S Davis | 3 | 3
Q | (United States) J Pugh | 3 | 5
8 | (United States) A Krickstein | 6 | 7
4 | (Sweden) A Järryd | 7 | 3 | 5
(Sweden) P Lundgren | 5 | 6 | 7
(Canada) G Michibata | 6 | 6
(South Africa) E Edwards | 0 | 3
(United States) M Freeman | 2 | 3
(India) R Krishnan | 6 | 6
(Peru) J Yzaga | 6 | 6
5 | (United States) P Annacone | 1 | 4

Second round
1 | (Sweden) S Edberg | 6 | 6
(Australia) B Dyke | 4 | 1
Q | (United States) D Rostagno | 6 | 6
8 | (United States) A Krickstein | 1 | 3
(Sweden) P Lundgren | 6 | 6
(Canada) G Michibata | 0 | 3
(India) R Krishnan | 7 | 3 | 2
(Peru) J Yzaga | 5 | 6 | 6

Quarterfinals
1 | (Sweden) S Edberg | 6 | 7
Q | (United States) D Rostagno | 0 | 5
(Sweden) P Lundgren | 6 | 4 | 6
(Peru) J Yzaga | 0 | 6 | 2

Semifinals
1 | (Sweden) S Edberg | 6 | 6
(Sweden) P Lundgren | 4 | 3

=== Bottom half ===
First round
6 | (United States) J McEnroe | 6 | 6
Q | (United States) K Jones | 1 | 1
(South Africa) C Steyn | 3 | 6 | 7
(Soviet Union) A Chesnokov | 6 | 3 | 5
(United States) D Pate | 4 | 6 | 6
(Mexico) L Lavalle | 6 | 3 | 2
(United States) M Leach | 7 | 5 | 6
3/WC | (United States) T Mayotte | 6 | 7 | 3
7 | (United States) J Arias | 6 | 1
WC | (United States) T Witsken | 7 | 6
WC | (Australia) P Cash | 4 | 7 | 6
(Nigeria) N Odizor | 6 | 6 | 4
(United States) J Canter | 7 | 3 | 7
(United States) T Nelson | 6 | 6 | 6
(United States) J Sadri | 4 | 4
2 | (United States) B Gilbert | 6 | 6

Second round
6 | (United States) J McEnroe | 7 | 6
(South Africa) C Steyn | 5 | 3
(United States) D Pate | 6 | 6
(United States) M Leach | 2 | 3
WC | (United States) T Witsken | 3 | 2
WC | (Australia) P Cash | 6 | 6
(United States) J Canter | 3 | 3
2 | (United States) B Gilbert | 6 | 6

Quarterfinals
6 | (United States) J McEnroe | 6 | 7
(United States) D Pate | 3 | 6
WC | (Australia) P Cash | 2 | 2
2 | (United States) B Gilbert | 6 | 6

Semifinals
6 | (United States) J McEnroe | 6 | 3 | 6
2 | (United States) B Gilbert | 1 | 6 | 3
