= 1986 Paine Webber Classic – Singles =

Singles
- 1986 Paine Webber Classic

Final
- Champion: (Czechoslovakia) Ivan Lendl
- Runner-up: (United States) Jimmy Connors
- Score: 6–2, 6–0

Details
- Draw: 32
- Seeds: 8

Events
Singles	Doubles
← 1985 ·	Paine Webber Classic	· 1987 →

Ivan Lendl was the defending champion and won in the final 6–2, 6–0 against Jimmy Connors.

== Seeds ==
1. (Czechoslovakia) Ivan Lendl (champion)
2. (United States) Jimmy Connors (final)
3. (United States) Brad Gilbert (first round)
4. (United States) Johan Kriek (quarterfinals)
5. (Ecuador) Andrés Gómez (semifinals)
6. (United States) Tim Mayotte (semifinals)
7. (United States) Jimmy Arias (second round)
8. (United States) David Pate (quarterfinals)

== Draw ==
=== Key ===
- Q = Qualifier
- WC = Wild card
- LL = Lucky loser
- Alt = Alternate
- SE = Special exempt
- PR = Protected ranking
- ITF = ITF entry
- JE = Junior exempt
- w/o = Walkover
- r = Retired
- d = Defaulted
- SR = Special ranking

=== Finals ===
Semifinals
1	(Czechoslovakia) Ivan Lendl	6	6
5	(Ecuador) Andrés Gómez	3	3
6	(United States) Tim Mayotte	5	6	3
2	(United States) Jimmy Connors	7	3	6

Final
1	(Czechoslovakia) Ivan Lendl	6	6
2	(United States) Jimmy Connors	2	0

=== Top half ===
First round
1	(Czechoslovakia) I Lendl	6	7
(United States) J Sadri	4	5
(United States) E Teltscher	7	6
(United States) L Duncan	6	1
(India) R Krishnan	2	4
(United States) R Seguso	6	6
(United States) T Gullikson	3	6	3
8	(United States) D Pate	6	3	6
4	(United States) J Kriek	6	6
(United States) T Wilkison	4	3
(United States) S Giammalva Jr.	4	3
(United States) B Schultz	6	6
(United States) A Krickstein	5	7	6
Q	(Australia) P Cash	7	6	4
Q	(United States) J Lapidus	7	5	2
5	(Ecuador) A Gómez	6	7	6

Second round
1	(Czechoslovakia) I Lendl	6	6
(United States) E Teltscher	4	2
(United States) R Seguso	3	6
8	(United States) D Pate	6	7
4	(United States) J Kriek	6	3	6
(United States) B Schultz	3	6	3
(United States) A Krickstein	7	3	4
5	(Ecuador) A Gómez	6	6	6

Quarterfinals
1	(Czechoslovakia) I Lendl	6	6
8	(United States) D Pate	4	2
4	(United States) J Kriek	3	3
5	(Ecuador) A Gómez	6	6

Semifinals
1	(Czechoslovakia) I Lendl	6	6
5	(Ecuador) A Gómez	3	3

=== Bottom half ===
First round
6	(United States) T Mayotte	6	6
(United States) S Davis	4	3
(Peru) J Yzaga	6	6
Q	(United States) L Stefanki	4	2
Q	(United States) K Flach	6	7	6
WC	(United States) B Pearce	7	5	1
(United States) G Holmes	6	6
3	(United States) B Gilbert	2	4
7	(United States) J Arias	7	5	6
WC	(United States) J Ross	5	7	4
WC	(United States) T Witsken	7	5	6
(Australia) P McNamee	5	7	4
(United Kingdom) J Lloyd	6	6
(Mexico) L Lavalle	4	2
(United States) M Leach	6	0	1
2	(United States) J Connors	3	6	6

Second round
6	(United States) T Mayotte	6	6
(Peru) J Yzaga	4	3
Q	(United States) K Flach	3	2
(United States) G Holmes	6	6
7	(United States) J Arias	7	2	4
WC	(United States) T Witsken	5	6	6
(United Kingdom) J Lloyd	5	2
2	(United States) J Connors	7	6

Quarterfinals
6	(United States) T Mayotte	3	6	7
(United States) G Holmes	6	3	6
WC	(United States) T Witsken	3	0
2	(United States) J Connors	6	6

Semifinals
6	(United States) T Mayotte	5	6	3
2	(United States) J Connors	7	3	6
