= 1975 Majestic International =

- Date: September 22–28
- Edition: 4th
- Draw: 56S / 16D
- Prize money: $50,000
- Surface: Carpet (Sporteze) / indoor
- Location: Denver, United States
- Venue: Denver Auditorium Arena

Champions

Singles
- (Czechoslovakia) Martina Navratilova

Doubles
- (France) Françoise Dürr / (Netherlands) Betty Stöve
← 1974 ·	Virginia Slims of Denver	· 1984 →

The 1975 Majestic International, also known as the Denver Women's Open, was a women's tennis tournament played on indoor carpet courts at the Denver Auditorium Arena in Denver, Colorado in the United States. The event was part of the USTA–WTA Summer/Fall Circuit of the 1975 WTA Tour. It was the fourth edition of the tournament and was held from September 22 through September 28, 1975. First-seeded Martina Navratilova won the singles title and earned $10,000 first-prize money.

== Finals ==
=== Singles ===
(Czechoslovakia) Martina Navratilova defeated (United States) Carrie Meyer 4–6, 6–4, 6–3

- It was Navratilova's 4th singles title of the year and the 5th of her career.

=== Doubles ===
(France) Françoise Dürr / (Netherlands) Betty Stöve defeated (United States) Rosemary Casals / (Czechoslovakia) Martina Navratilova 3–6, 6–1, 7–6

== Prize money ==
Event	W	F	3rd	4th	QF	Round of 16	Round of 32	Round of 64
Singles	$10,000	$5,600	$2,900	$2,300	$1,300	$800	$400	$200
