= 1985 Virginia Slims of Los Angeles =

- Date: July 28 – August 4
- Edition: 12th
- Category: 4
- Draw: 56S / 32D
- Prize money: $250,000
- Surface: Hard / outdoor
- Location: Manhattan Beach, California, U.S.
- Venue: Manhattan Beach Country Club

Champions

Singles
- (West Germany) Claudia Kohde-Kilsch

Doubles
- (West Germany) Claudia Kohde-Kilsch (Czechoslovakia) Helena Suková
← 1984 ·	Virginia Slims of Los Angeles	· 1986 →

The 1985 Virginia Slims of Los Angeles was a women's tennis tournament played on outdoor hard courts at the Manhattan Beach Country Club in Manhattan Beach, California in the United States and was part of the Category 4 tier of the 1985 Virginia Slims World Championship Series. It was the 12th edition of the tournament and was held from July 28 through August 4, 1985. Fifth-seeded Claudia Kohde-Kilsch won the singles title.

== Finals ==
=== Singles ===
(West Germany) Claudia Kohde-Kilsch defeated (United States) Pam Shriver 6–2, 6–4

- It was Kohde-Kilsch' 1st singles title of the year and the 6th of her career.

=== Doubles ===
(West Germany) Claudia Kohde-Kilsch / (Czechoslovakia) Helena Suková defeated (Czechoslovakia) Hana Mandlíková / (Australia) Wendy Turnbull 6–4, 6–2

== See also ==
- 1985 Volvo Tennis Los Angeles – men's tournament
