= 1987 Paine Webber Classic – Doubles =

Doubles
- 1987 Paine Webber Classic

Final
- Champions: (United States) Sherwood Stewart (Australia) Kim Warwick
- Runners-up: (United States) Paul Annacone (South Africa) Christo van Rensburg
- Score: 2–6, 7–6, 6–4

Details
- Draw: 16 (1WC)
- Seeds: 4

Events
Singles	Doubles
- Verizon Tennis Challenge

Andrés Gómez and Ivan Lendl were the defending champions, but Lendl did not compete this year. Gómez teamed up with Eddie Edwards and lost in the first round to Sherwood Stewart and Kim Warwick.

Stewart and Warwick won the title by defeating Paul Annacone and Christo van Rensburg 2–6, 7–6, 6–4 in the final.

== Seeds ==
1. (United States) Paul Annacone / (South Africa) Christo van Rensburg (final)
2. (United States) Ken Flach / (United States) Robert Seguso (quarterfinals)
3. (South Africa) Christo Steyn / (South Africa) Danie Visser (quarterfinals)
4. (United States) Sherwood Stewart / (Australia) Kim Warwick (champions)

== Draw ==
Key

- Q = Qualifier
- WC = Wild card
- LL = Lucky loser
- Alt = Alternate
- ITF = ITF entry
- PR = Protected ranking
- SR = Special ranking
- SE = Special exempt
- JE = Junior exempt
- JR = Junior Accelerator Programme entrant
- CO = College Accelerator Programme entrant
- NG = Next Gen Accelerator Program entrant
- w/o = Walkover
- r = Retired
- d = Defaulted

=== Draw ===
First round
1	(United States) P Annacone (South Africa) C van Rensburg	6	6
(South Africa) M Robertson (United States) T Warneke	2	3
(United States) M Dickson (United States) B Willenborg	6	2	4
(United States) B Gilbert (United States) J Kriek	2	6	6
3	(South Africa) C Steyn (South Africa) D Visser	6	7
(United States) K Jones (United States) B Pearce	4	6
(United States) S Davis (United States) D Pate	6	6
(New Zealand) K Evernden (South Africa) G Muller	2	3
(United States) M Anger (United States) G Holmes	6	6	3
WC	(United States) H Pfister (United States) E Teltscher	7	2	6
(South Africa) E Edwards (Ecuador) A Gómez	7	5	3
4	(United States) S Stewart (Australia) K Warwick	6	7	6
(United States) D Cassidy (United States) G Layendecker	2	5
(United States) A Kohlberg (United States) R Van't Hof	6	7
(United States) M De Palmer (United States) G Donnelly	4	4
2	(United States) K Flach (United States) R Seguso	6	6

Quarterfinals
1	(United States) P Annacone (South Africa) C van Rensburg	6	1	6
(United States) B Gilbert (United States) J Kriek	3	6	3
3	(South Africa) C Steyn (South Africa) D Visser	3	6	3
(United States) S Davis (United States) D Pate	6	1	6
WC	(United States) H Pfister (United States) E Teltscher	6	6	3
4	(United States) S Stewart (Australia) K Warwick	7	3	6
(United States) A Kohlberg (United States) R Van't Hof	6	6
2	(United States) K Flach (United States) R Seguso	4	1

Semifinals
1	(United States) P Annacone (South Africa) C van Rensburg	6	6
(United States) S Davis (United States) D Pate	4	2
4	(United States) S Stewart (Australia) K Warwick	6	6
(United States) A Kohlberg (United States) R Van't Hof	4	3

Final
1	(United States) P Annacone (South Africa) C van Rensburg	6	6	4
4	(United States) S Stewart (Australia) K Warwick	2	7	6
