= 1974 Virginia Slims of Denver =

- Date: September 23–29
- Edition: 3rd
- Draw: 32S / 16D
- Prize money: $50,000
- Surface: Hard / indoor
- Location: Denver, United States
- Venue: Denver Auditorium Arena

Champions

Singles
- (Australia) Evonne Goolagong

Doubles
- (France) Françoise Dürr / (Netherlands) Betty Stöve
← 1973 ·	Virginia Slims of Denver	· 1975 →

The 1974 Virginia Slims of Denver was a women's tennis tournament played on indoor carpet courts at the Denver Auditorium Arena in Denver, Colorado in the United States that was part of the 1974 Virginia Slims World Championship Series. It was the third edition of the tournament and was held from September 23 through September 29, 1974. Third-seeded Evonne Goolagong won the singles title and earned $10,000 first-prize money.

== Finals ==
=== Singles ===
(Australia) Evonne Goolagong defeated (United States) Chris Evert 7–5, 3–6, 6–4

- It was Goolagong's 3rd title of the year and the 52nd of her career.

=== Doubles ===
(France) Françoise Dürr / (Netherlands) Betty Stöve defeated (United States) Mona Schallau / (United States) Pam Teeguarden 6–2, 7–5

== Prize money ==
Event	W	F	SF	QF	Round of 16	Round of 32
Singles	$10,000	$5,600	$2,800	$1,400	$700	$350

== See also ==
- 1974 United Bank Classic
