= 1973 Virginia Slims of Denver =

- Date: July 30 – August 5
- Edition: 2nd
- Draw: 32S / 16D
- Prize money: $30,000
- Surface: Hard
- Location: Denver, Colorado, U.S.
- Venue: South High School
- Attendance: 22,800

Champions

Singles
- (United States) Billie Jean King

Doubles
- (United States) Rosemary Casals / (United States) Billie Jean King (France) Françoise Dürr / (Netherlands) Betty Stöve
← 1972 ·	Virginia Slims of Denver	· 1974 →

The 1973 Virginia Slims of Denver, also known by its sponsored name Denver Majestic Tournament, was a women's tennis tournament played on hard court at the South High School in Denver, Colorado in the United States that was part of the 1973 Virginia Slims World Championship Series. It was the second edition of the tournament and was held from July 30 through August 5, 1973. First-seeded Billie Jean King won the singles title and earned $7,000 first-prize money. Total attendance for the event was 22,800 which made it the first women's-only tournament to have an attendance of more than 20,000.

== Finals ==
=== Singles ===
(United States) Billie Jean King defeated (Netherlands) Betty Stöve 6–4, 6–2

- It was King's 6th title of the year and the 103rd of her career.

=== Doubles ===
(United States) Rosemary Casals / (United States) Billie Jean King vs. (France) Françoise Dürr / (Netherlands) Betty Stöve 3–2 match abandoned due to rain, prize shared

== Prize money ==
Event	W	F	3rd	4th	QF	Round of 16	Round of 32
Singles	$7,000	$3,500	$1,950	$1,650	$900	$400	$175

== See also ==
- 1973 Denver WCT
