= 1985 Virginia Slims of Denver =

- Date: January 14 – 20
- Edition: 6th
- Draw: 32S / 16D
- Prize money: $75,000
- Surface: Carpet / indoor
- Location: Denver, Colorado, United States

Champions

Singles
- (United States) Peanut Louie-Harper

Doubles
- (United States) Mary Lou Daniels / (United States) Robin White
← 1984 ·	Virginia Slims of Denver	· 1991 →

The 1985 VS of Denver was a women's tennis tournament played on indoor carpet courts in Denver, Colorado in the United States and part of the 1984 Virginia Slims World Championship Series. (Note: The 1984 Virginia Slims World Championship Series ran from March 1984 through March 1985.) It was the sixth edition of the tournament and was played from January 14 through January 20, 1985. Sixth-seeded Peanut Louie-Harper won the singles title.

== Finals ==
=== Singles ===
(United States) Peanut Louie-Harper defeated (United States) Zina Garrison 6–4, 4–6, 6–4

=== Doubles ===
(United States) Mary Lou Daniels / (United States) Robin White defeated (United States) Leslie Allen / (United States) Sharon Walsh 1–6, 6–4 7–5
