= 1974 United Bank Classic =

- Date: April 22–28
- Edition: 3rd
- Category: World Championship Tennis
- Draw: 32S / 16D
- Prize money: $50,000
- Surface: Carpet / indoor
- Location: Denver, Colorado, U.S.

Champions

Singles
- (United States) Roscoe Tanner

Doubles
- (United States) Arthur Ashe / (United States) Roscoe Tanner
- Denver Open

The 1974 United Bank Classic, also known as the Denver WCT, was a men's tennis tournament played on indoor carpet courts in Denver, Colorado in the United States that was part of the 1974 World Championship Tennis circuit. It was the third edition of the tournament and took place from April 22 through April 28, 1974. Sixth-seeded Roscoe Tanner won the singles competition.

== Finals ==
=== Singles ===
(United States) Roscoe Tanner defeated (United States) Arthur Ashe 6–2, 6–4

- It was Tanner's first singles title of his career.

=== Doubles ===
(United States) Arthur Ashe / (United States) Roscoe Tanner defeated (United Kingdom) Mark Cox / (Japan) Jun Kamiwazumi 6–3, 7–6

== See also ==
- 1974 Virginia Slims of Denver
