= 1972 Virginia Slims of Denver =

- Date: August 14–20
- Edition: 1st
- Draw: 32S/16D
- Prize money: $25,000
- Surface: Hard
- Location: Denver, United States
- Venue: South High School

Champions

Singles
- (United States) Nancy Richey Gunter

Doubles
- (France) Françoise Dürr / (Australia) Lesley Hunt
Virginia Slims of Denver	· 1973 →

The 1972 Virginia Slims of Denver, also known as the Virginia Slims Denver International, was a women's tennis tournament played on hard court at the South High School in Denver, Colorado in the United States that was part of the 1972 WT Pro Tour. It was the inaugural edition of the tournament and was held from August 14 through August 20, 1972. Third-seeded Nancy Richey Gunter won the singles title and earned $6,000 first-prize money.

== Finals ==
=== Singles ===
(United States) Nancy Richey Gunter defeated (United States) Billie Jean King 1–6, 6–4, 6–4

=== Doubles ===
(France) Françoise Dürr / (Australia) Lesley Hunt defeated (Australia) Helen Gourlay / (Australia) Karen Krantzcke 6–0, 6–3

== Prize money ==
Event	W	F	3rd	4th	QF	Round of 16	Round of 32
Singles	$6,000	$3,400	$2,000	$1,600	$1,000	$400	$150

== See also ==
- 1972 Denver WCT
