= 1984 Virginia Slims of Los Angeles =

- Date: October 1–7
- Edition: 11th
- Draw: 32S / 16D
- Prize money: $150,000
- Surface: Hard / outdoor
- Location: Manhattan Beach, California, U.S.
- Venue: Manhattan Country Club

Champions

Singles
- (United States) Chris Evert-Lloyd

Doubles
- (United States) Chris Evert-Lloyd / (Australia) Wendy Turnbull
← 1983 ·	Virginia Slims of Los Angeles	· 1985 →

The 1984 Virginia Slims of Los Angeles was a women's tennis tournament played on outdoor hard courts at the Manhattan Country Club in Manhattan Beach, California in the United States that was part of the 1984 Virginia Slims World Championship Series. The tournament was held from October 1 through October 7, 1984. First-seeded Chris Evert-Lloyd won the singles title.

== Finals ==
=== Singles ===
(United States) Chris Evert-Lloyd defeated (Australia) Wendy Turnbull 6–2, 6–3

- It was Evert-Lloyd's 5th singles title of the year and the 131st of her career.

=== Doubles ===
(United States) Chris Evert-Lloyd / (Australia) Wendy Turnbull defeated (West Germany) Bettina Bunge / (West Germany) Eva Pfaff 6–2, 6–4

- It was Evert-Lloyd's 5th title of the year and the 152nd of her career. It was Turnbull's 2nd title of the year and the 57th of her career.

== See also ==
- 1984 Union 76 Pacific Southwest Open – men's tournament
