= 1986 Paine Webber Classic =

- Date: March 17–24
- Edition: 2nd
- Category: Grand Prix
- Draw: 32S / 16D
- Prize money: $250,000
- Surface: Hard / outdoors
- Location: Fort Myers, Florida, U.S.

Champions

Singles
- (Czechoslovakia) Ivan Lendl

Doubles
- (Ecuador) Andrés Gómez / (Czechoslovakia) Ivan Lendl
- Paine Webber Classic

The 1986 Paine Webber Classic was a men's tennis tournament played on outdoor hard courts in Fort Myers, Florida in the United States that was part of the 1986 Nabisco Grand Prix. It was the second edition of the tournament and was held from March 17 through March 24, 1986. First-seeded Ivan Lendl won the singles title.

== Finals ==
=== Singles ===
(Czechoslovakia) Ivan Lendl defeated (United States) Jimmy Connors 6–2, 6–0

- It was Lendl's 4th singles title of the year and the 57th of his career.

=== Doubles ===
(Ecuador) Andrés Gómez / (Czechoslovakia) Ivan Lendl defeated (Australia) Peter Doohan / (Australia) Paul McNamee 7–5, 6–4

- It was Gómez's 1st title of the year and the 28th of his career. It was Lendl's 5th title of the year and the 62nd of his career.

== See also ==
- Connors–Lendl rivalry
