= 1972 United Bank Classic =

- Date: April 24–30
- Edition: 1st
- Category: World Championship Tennis
- Draw: 31S / 8D
- Prize money: $50,000
- Surface: Carpet / indoor
- Location: Denver, Colorado, U.S.

Champions

Singles
- (Australia) Rod Laver

Doubles
- (Australia) Roy Emerson / (Australia) Rod Laver
- Denver Open

The 1972 United Bank Classic, also known as the Denver WCT, was a men's tennis tournament played on indoor carpet courts in Denver, Colorado in the United States that was part of the 1972 World Championship Tennis circuit. It was the inaugural edition of the tournament and took place from April 24 through April 30, 1972. First-seeded Rod Laver won the first edition of both the doubles and singles competition. There was criticism by players, including Arthur Ashe, that the playing conditions on the Sporface carpet courts were too fast.

== Finals ==
=== Singles ===
(Australia) Rod Laver defeated (United States) Marty Riessen, 4–6, 6–3, 6–4

=== Doubles ===
(Australia) Roy Emerson / (Australia) Rod Laver defeated (South Africa) Cliff Drysdale / (United Kingdom) Roger Taylor, 1–6, 6–4, 6–3

== Prize money ==
Event	W	F	SF	QF	Round of 16	Round of 32
Singles	$10,000	$5,000	$3,000	$1,000	$750	$500

== See also ==
- 1972 Virginia Slims of Denver
