= 1983 Dallas Open =

1983 Paine Webber Classic
- Date: September 12–18
- Edition: Only
- Category: Grand Prix circuit
- Draw: 32S / 16D
- Prize money: $200,000
- Surface: Hard / outdoor
- Location: Las Colinas Sports Club Irving, Texas, US

Champions

Singles
- (Ecuador) Andrés Gómez

Doubles
- (Nigeria) Nduka Odizor / (United States) Van Winitsky
Dallas Open

The 1983 Dallas Open also known as the Paine Webber Classic for sponsorship reasons, was a men's tennis tournament held in Dallas, Texas in the United States and played on outdoor hard courts at the Las Colinas Sports Club. The tournament was created and managed by Dallas-based Talent Sports International. It was part of the 1983 Volvo Grand Prix. The tournament took place from September 12 through September 18, 1983. Fourth-seeded Andrés Gómez won the singles title over sixth-seeded Brian Teacher.

== Finals ==
=== Singles ===
(Ecuador) Andrés Gómez defeated (United States) Brian Teacher 6–7, 6–1, 6–1

- It was Gómez's only title of the year and the 16th of his career.

=== Doubles ===
(Nigeria) Nduka Odizor / (United States) Van Winitsky defeated (United States) Steve Denton / (United States) Sherwood Stewart 6–3, 7–5

- It was Odizor's 2nd title of the year and the 3rd of his career. It was Winitsky's only title of the year and the 12th of his career.

== See also ==
- 1983 Virginia Slims of Dallas
