= Aniceto Álvarez =

Spanish tennis player (born 1957)

- Country (sports): Spain
- Born: October 24, 1957 (age 68)
- Plays: Right-handed

Singles
- Career record: 0–1

Doubles
- Career record: 6–7
- Last updated on: November 19, 2020.

Aniceto Álvarez Álvarez (born October 24, 1957) is a Spanish former tennis player who reached as high as the eighth position in the Spanish national ranking.

His best results as a professional came in doubles. He reached the semifinals at the 1976 Swedish Open partnering Peter Fleming, and lost in the same round at the 1978 Columbus Open, this time alongside Andrés Molina.
