= 1986 Virginia Slims of Los Angeles =

Coordinates: 34°4′9″N 118°26′48.5″W

- Date: August 11–17
- Edition: 13th
- Category: Category 4
- Draw: 56S / 32D
- Prize money: $250,000
- Surface: Hard / outdoor
- Location: Manhattan Beach, California, U.S.
- Venue: Manhattan Country Club

Champions

Singles
- (United States) Martina Navratilova

Doubles
- (United States) Martina Navratilova / (United States) Pam Shriver
← 1985 ·	Virginia Slims of Los Angeles	· 1987 →

The 1986 Virginia Slims of Los Angeles was a women's tennis tournament played on outdoor hard courts at the Manhattan Country Club in Manhattan Beach, California in the United States and was part of the Category 4 tier of the 1986 WTA Tour. It was the 13th edition of the tournament and was held from August 11 through August 17, 1986. First-seeded Martina Navratilova won the singles title and earned $45,000 first-prize money.

== Finals ==
=== Singles ===
(United States) Martina Navratilova defeated (United States) Chris Evert-Lloyd 7–6^{(7–5)}, 6–3

- It was Navratilova's 8th singles title of the year and the 119th of her career.

=== Doubles ===
(United States) Martina Navratilova / (United States) Pam Shriver defeated (West Germany) Claudia Kohde-Kilsch / (Czechoslovakia) Helena Suková 6–4, 6–3

== See also ==
- Evert–Navratilova rivalry
