= Virginia Slims of Denver =

VS of Denver

Defunct tennis tournament
- Event name: VS of Denver (1972–74, 1984–85); Majestic Championships (1975); Aurora Classic (1991)
- Tour: WTA Tour (1972–91)
- Founded: 1972
- Abolished: 1991
- Editions: 7
- Surface: Hard (1972–84); Carpet (1985–91)

The Virginia Slims of Denver is a defunct WTA Tour affiliated tennis tournament played from 1972 to 1991. It was held in Denver, Colorado in the United States (in 1991: Aurora, Colorado, at a nine miles' distance from Denver) and played on indoor hard courts from 1972 to 1984 and on indoor carpet courts from 1985 to 1991.

Françoise Dürr was the most successful player at the tournament, winning the doubles competition three times, once with Australian Lesley Hunt and twice with Dutchwoman Betty Stöve.

== Results ==
=== Singles ===
| Year | Champions | Runners-up | Score |
|---|---|---|---|
| 1972 | (United States) Nancy Richey Gunter | (United States) Billie Jean King | 1–6, 6–4, 6–4 |
| 1973 | (United States) Billie Jean King | (Netherlands) Betty Stöve | 6–4, 6–2 |
| 1974 | (Australia) Evonne Goolagong | (United States) Chris Evert | 7–5, 3–6, 6–4 |
| 1975 | (United States) Martina Navratilova | (United States) Carrie Meyer | 4–6, 6–4, 6–3 |
| 1976 - 1983 | Not Held | | |
| 1984 | (United States) Mary Lou Piatek | (United States) Kim Sands | 6–1, 6–1 |
| 1985 | (United States) Peanut Louie | (United States) Zina Garrison | 6–4, 4–6, 6–4 |
| 1986 - 1990 | Not Held | | |
| 1991 | (United States) Lori McNeil | (Netherlands) Manon Bollegraf | 6–3, 6–4 |

=== Doubles ===
| Year | Champions | Runners-up | Score |
|---|---|---|---|
| 1972 | (France) Françoise Dürr (Australia) Lesley Hunt | (Australia) Helen Gourlay-Cawley (Australia) Karen Krantzcke | 6–0, 6–3 |
| 1973 | (United States) Rosemary Casals (United States) Billie Jean King | (France) Françoise Dürr (Netherlands) Betty Stöve | 3–2 abandoned (rain) |
| 1974 | (France) Françoise Dürr (Netherlands) Betty Stöve | (United States) Mona Schallau (United States) Pam Teeguarden | 6–2, 7–5 |
| 1975 | (France) Françoise Dürr (Netherlands) Betty Stöve | (United States) Rosemary Casals (United States) Martina Navratilova | 3–6, 6–1, 7–6 |
| 1976 - 1983 | Not Held | | |
| 1984 | (United Kingdom) Anne Hobbs (Netherlands) Marcella Mesker | (United States) Sherry Acker (United States) Candy Reynolds | 6–2, 6–3 |
| 1985 | (United States) Mary Lou Piatek (United States) Robin White | (United States) Leslie Allen (United States) Sharon Walsh | 1–6, 6–4, 7–5 |
| 1986 - 1990 | Not Held | | |
| 1991 | (South Africa) Lise Gregory (United States) Gretchen Magers | (United States) Patty Fendick (United States) Lori McNeil | 6–4, 6–4 |

== See also ==
- Denver Open – men's tournament
