= 1984 Union 76 Pacific Southwest Open =

- Date: September 10–16
- Edition: 58th
- Category: Grand Prix
- Draw: 48S / 24D
- Prize money: $200,000
- Surface: Hard / outdoor
- Location: Los Angeles, California, U.S.
- Venue: Los Angeles Tennis Center
- Attendance: 41,677

Champions

Singles
- (United States) Jimmy Connors

Doubles
- (United States) Ken Flach / (United States) Robert Seguso
← 1983 ·	Pacific Southwest Open	· 1985 →

The 1984 Union 76 Pacific Southwest Open was a men's tennis tournament played on outdoor hard courts at the newly-opened Los Angeles Tennis Center (Note: The Los Angeles Tennis Center at UCLA was opened in May 1984 and hosted the demonstration tennis event of the 1984 Summer Olympics.) in Los Angeles, California in the United States. The event moved back from April to the more traditional September time slot and was part of the 1984 Volvo Grand Prix circuit. It was the 58th edition of the Pacific Southwest tournament and was held from September 10 through September 16, 1984. First-seeded Jimmy Connors won the singles title and the corresponding $36,000 first-prize money.

== Finals ==
=== Singles ===
(United States) Jimmy Connors defeated (United States) Eliot Teltscher 6–4, 4–6, 6–4

- It was Connors' 4th singles title of the year and the 104th of his career.

=== Doubles ===
(United States) Ken Flach / (United States) Robert Seguso defeated (Poland) Wojciech Fibak / (United States) Gene Mayer 4–6, 6–4, 6–3

== Prize money ==
Event	W	F	SF	QF	3R	2R	1R
Singles	$36,000	$18,000	$9,000	$5,000	$3,100	$1,700	$900

== See also ==
- 1984 Virginia Slims of Los Angeles – women's tournament
