= 1976 United Bank Tennis Classic =

1976 Denver WCT
- Date: April 19–25
- Edition: 5th
- Category: World Championship Tennis (WCT)
- Draw: 16S / 8D
- Prize money: $60,000
- Surface: Carpet / indoor
- Location: Denver, Colorado, U.S.

Champions

Singles
- (United States) Jimmy Connors

Doubles
- (Australia) John Alexander / (Australia) Phil Dent
- Denver WCT

The 1976 Denver WCT, also known as the 1976 United Bank Tennis Classic for sponsorship reasons, was a men's professional tennis tournament. It was held on indoor carpet courts in Denver, Colorado. It was the fifth edition of the tournament and was held from 19 April through 25 April 1976. The tournament was part of the 1976 World Championship Tennis circuit. First-seeded Jimmy Connors won the singles title and the accompanying $17,000 first prize.

== Finals ==
=== Singles ===
(United States) Jimmy Connors defeated (Australia) Ross Case 7–6, 6–2

- It was Connor's 5th singles title of the year and the 46th of his career.

=== Doubles ===
(Australia) John Alexander / (Australia) Phil Dent defeated (United States) Jimmy Connors / (United States) Billy Martin 6–7, 6–2, 7–5
