= Dallas Open (1953–1983) =

Defunct tennis tournament
- Event name: Paine Webber Classic (1983)
- Tour: ILTF World Circuit (1953-71); Grand Prix circuit (1983)
- Founded: 1953
- Abolished: 1983
- Editions: 19
- Location: Dallas, Texas, U.S.
- Surface: Hard - outdoor

The Dallas Open, also known by its sponsored name the Paine Webber Classic, was an outdoor hard court ATP Tour affiliated men's tennis tournament. It was first founded in 1953 as a combined men's and women's event by the Dallas Tennis Association and the first installment ran annually until 1971 when it was discontinued. In 1983 the tournament was revived as mens event and as the successor to the Denver Open which was cancelled after the 1982 edition due to a loss of sponsorship. Initially the replacement tournament was planned for Atlantic City but this was later changed to Dallas. In 2022 the New York Open was moved to Dallas and revived once again as the Dallas Open.

Notable male players included Jimmy Connors, John Fitzgerald, John Alexander, Andrés Gómez, Brian Teacher, Nduka Odizor, Sherwood Stewart, and Steve Denton.

== Finals ==
=== Men's Singles ===
(incomplete roll)

Year	Champions	Runners-up	Score
1953	(United States) James Schulze	(United States) John Been	2–6, 6–4, 6–0
1954	(United States) James Schulze (2)	(United States) Bill Lust	6–3, 6–4
1955	(United States) Bill Lust	(United States) James Schulze	7–5, 6–2
1956	(United States) Dick Savitt	(United States) Bernard Bartzen	2–6, 7–5, 6–1
1957	(United States) Bill Lust (2)	(United States) James Schulze	10–8, 2–6, 6–4
1959	(United States) Ron Fisher	(United States) Jack Turpin	6–2, 4–6, 6–1
1961	(United States) Willie Wolff	(United States) Ron Fisher	6–1, 3–6, 6–3
1962	(United States) Ronald Holmberg	(United States) Tom Howorth	6–3, 6–2
1964	(Bolivia) Ramiro Benavides	(United States) Ron Fisher	4–6, 6–3, 6–2
1965	(United States) Dennis Ralston	(Mexico) Joaquín Loyo-Mayo	7–5, 6–3
1971	(United States) Bill Matyastik	(United States) Al Driscole	6–1, 6–0
1983	(Ecuador) Andrés Gómez	(United States) Brian Teacher	6–7, 6–1, 6–1

=== Men's Doubles ===
Year	Champions	Runners-up	Score
1953	(United States) Bernard Clinton (United States) Fred Highinbotham	(United States) Fred Royer (United States) Jimmy Quick	6–4, 7–2
1983	(Nigeria) Nduka Odizor (United States) Van Winitsky	(United States) Steve Denton (United States) Sherwood Stewart	6–3, 7–5

=== Women's Singles ===
(incomplete roll)

Year	Champions	Runners-up	Score
1953	(United States) Jackie Johannes	(United States) Nancy Armor	6–4, 6–2
