= 1988 DuPont Classic =

- Date: March 7–12
- Edition: 4th
- Category: Grand Prix
- Draw: 32S / 16D
- Prize money: $297,500
- Surface: Hard / outdoor
- Location: Orlando, Florida, U.S.

Champions

Singles
- (Soviet Union) Andrei Chesnokov

Doubles
- (France) Guy Forget / (France) Yannick Noah
- Verizon Tennis Challenge

The 1988 DuPont Classic was a men's tennis tournament played on outdoor hard courts in Orlando, Florida, United States that was part of the 1988 Grand Prix circuit. It was the fourth edition of the tournament and took place from March 7 through March 12, 1988. Unseeded Andrei Chesnokov won the singles title and earned $59,000 first-prize money.

== Finals ==
=== Singles ===
(Soviet Union) Andrei Chesnokov defeated (Czechoslovakia) Miloslav Mečíř 7–6^{(8–6)}, 6–1

- It was Chesnokov's 1st singles title of the year and the 2nd of his career.

=== Doubles ===
(France) Guy Forget / (France) Yannick Noah defeated (United States) Sherwood Stewart / (Australia) Kim Warwick 6–4, 6–4
