= Denver Open (tennis) =

Defunct tennis tournament
- Event name: Denver WCT (1972–76); United Bank Tennis Classic (1977–82)
- Tour: WCT circuit (1972–76); Grand Prix circuit (1977–82)
- Founded: 1972
- Abolished: 1982
- Editions: 11
- Location: Denver, Colorado, U.S.
- Surface: Carpet (i)

The Denver Open, also known as the Denver WCT or by its sponsored name United Bank Tennis Classic, was a WCT and Grand Prix affiliated men's tennis tournament played from 1972 to 1982. It was held in Denver, Colorado in the United States and played on indoor carpet courts. The loss of the main sponsor led to the cancellation of the tournament after the 1982 edition.

Jimmy Connors was the most successful player at the tournament, winning the singles competition three times.

== Finals ==
=== Singles ===
Year	Champions	Runners-up	Score
1972	(Australia) Rod Laver	(United States) Marty Riessen	4–6, 6–3, 6–4
1973	(United Kingdom) Mark Cox	(United States) Arthur Ashe	6–1, 6–1
1974	(United States) Roscoe Tanner	(United States) Arthur Ashe	6–2, 6–4
1975	(United States) Jimmy Connors	(United States) Brian Gottfried	6–3, 6–4
1976	(United States) Jimmy Connors	(Australia) Ross Case	7–6, 6–2
1977	(Sweden) Björn Borg	(United States) Brian Gottfried	7–5, 6–2
1978	(United States) Jimmy Connors	(United States) Stan Smith	6–2, 7–6
1979	(Poland) Wojciech Fibak	(United States) Victor Amaya	6–4, 6–1
1980	(United States) Gene Mayer	(United States) Victor Amaya	6–2, 6–2
1981	(United States) Gene Mayer	(United States) John Sadri	6–4, 6–4
1982	(United States) John Sadri	(Ecuador) Andrés Gómez	4–6, 6–1, 6–4
succeeded by Dallas Open

=== Doubles ===
Year	Champions	Runners-up	Score
1972	(Australia) Roy Emerson (Australia) Rod Laver	(Australia) John Newcombe (Australia) Tony Roche	6–2, 5–7, 7–6
1973	(United States) Arthur Ashe (United States) Roscoe Tanner	(Netherlands) Tom Okker (United States) Marty Riessen	3–6, 6–3, 7–6
1974	(United States) Arthur Ashe (United States) Roscoe Tanner	(United Kingdom) Mark Cox (Japan) Jun Kamiwazumi	6–3, 7–6
1975	(Australia) Roy Emerson (Australia) Rod Laver	(Australia) Bob Carmichael (Australia) Allan Stone	6–2, 3–6, 7–5
1976	(Australia) John Alexander (Australia) Phil Dent	(United States) Jimmy Connors (United States) Billy Martin	6–7, 6–2, 7–5
1977	(Australia) Colin Dibley (Australia) Geoff Masters	(Australia) Syd Ball (Australia) Kim Warwick	6–2, 6–3
1978	(South Africa) Bob Hewitt (South Africa) Frew McMillan	(United States) Fred McNair (United States) Sherwood Stewart	6–3, 6–2
1979	(United States) Robert Lutz (United States) Stan Smith	(Poland) Wojciech Fibak (Netherlands) Tom Okker	7–6, 6–3
1980	(South Africa) Kevin Curren (United States) Steve Denton	(Poland) Wojciech Fibak (Switzerland) Heinz Günthardt	7–5, 6–2
1981	(Zimbabwe) Andrew Pattison (United States) Butch Walts	(United States) Mel Purcell (United States) Dick Stockton	6–3, 6–4
1982	(South Africa) Kevin Curren (United States) Steve Denton	(Australia) Phil Dent (Australia) Kim Warwick	6–4, 6–4
succeeded by Dallas Open

- 1972 doubles results not included on ATP website

== See also ==
- Virginia Slims of Denver – women's tournament
