= Sherwood Stewart =

American tennis player

- Country (sports): United States
- Born: June 6, 1946 (age 80) Goose Creek, Texas, U.S.
- Height: 6 ft 2 in (1.88 m)
- Plays: Right-handed
- Prize money: $1,602,565

Singles
- Career record: 158–224
- Career titles: 1
- Highest ranking: No. 60 (December 31, 1978)

Grand Slam singles results
- Australian Open: 2R (1977, 1978)
- French Open: 3R (1976)
- Wimbledon: 3R (1975, 1978)
- US Open: 3R (1977)

Doubles
- Career record: 728–357
- Career titles: 53
- Highest ranking: No. 4 (March 3, 1980)

Grand Slam doubles results
- Australian Open: W (1984)
- French Open: W (1976, 1982)
- Wimbledon: SF (1982)
- US Open: F (1978)

Other doubles tournaments
- Tour Finals: W (1976)

Grand Slam mixed doubles results
- Australian Open: W (1987)
- Wimbledon: W (1988)

Sherwood Stewart (born June 6, 1946) is an American former professional tennis player who was active in the 1970s and 1980s and is mainly known for his achievements in doubles. Stewart was ranked as high as No. 60 in the world in singles on the ATP rankings on December 31, 1978, and No. 4 in doubles on January 3, 1983.

He attended Lamar University in Beaumont, Texas and graduated in 1969. He was the NCAA College Division Singles Champion in 1967 and was inducted into the Lamar University Hall of Honor.

He won 52 doubles titles, the biggest of them coming at the 1984 Australian Open, the 1976 French Open and 1982 French Open, in Cincinnati in 1974, in Monte Carlo in 1984, and in Hamburg in 1976. He was also in three additional Grand Slam doubles finals during his career. His lone singles title was the 1974 Irish Open. He became the first player to surpass $1 million in doubles career prize money.

After retiring from playing, he became a coach, most notably of Zina Garrison. He also played on the senior golf tour.

Stewart was inducted into the Texas Tennis Museum and Hall of Fame in 1996.

== Grand Slam finals ==
=== Doubles: 6 (3 wins / 3 losses) ===
Result	Year	Championship	Surface	Partner	Opponents	Score
Win	1976	French Open	Clay	(United States) Fred McNair	(United States) Brian Gottfried (Mexico) Raul Ramírez	7–6, 6–3, 6–1
Loss	1978	US Open	Hard	(United States) Marty Riessen	(United States) Robert Lutz (United States) Stan Smith	6–1, 5–7, 3–6
Win	1982	French Open (2)	Clay	(United States) Ferdi Taygan	(Chile) Hans Gildemeister (Chile) Belus Prajoux	7–5, 6–3, 1–1, ret.
Loss	1983	French Open	Clay	(Australia) Mark Edmondson	(Sweden) Anders Järryd (Sweden) Hans Simonsson	6–7, 4–6, 2–6
Loss	1983	Australian Open	Grass	(United States) Steve Denton	(Australia) Mark Edmondson (Australia) Paul McNamee	3–6, 6–7
Win	1984	Australian Open	Grass	(Australia) Mark Edmondson	(Sweden) Joakim Nyström (Sweden) Mats Wilander	6–2, 6–2, 7–5

=== Mixed doubles: 4 (2 wins / 2 losses) ===
Result	Year	Championship	Surface	Partner	Opponents	Score
Win	1987	Australian Open	Grass	(United States) Zina Garrison	(United Kingdom) Anne Hobbs (United Kingdom) Andrew Castle	3–6, 7–6^{(7–5)}, 6–3
Loss	1987	French Open	Clay	(United States) Lori McNeil	(United States) Pam Shriver (Spain) Emilio Sánchez	3–6, 6–7^{(4–7)}
Win	1988	Wimbledon	Grass	(United States) Zina Garrison	(United States) Gretchen Magers (United States) Kelly Jones	6–1, 7–6^{(7–3)}
Loss	1989	Australian Open	Hard	(United States) Zina Garrison	(Czechoslovakia) Jana Novotná (United States) Jim Pugh	3–6, 4–6

== Career finals ==
=== Singles: 3 (2 titles / 1 runner-up) ===
Result	W/L	Date	Tournament	Surface	Opponent	Score
Win	1–0	Jun 1973	Manchester, UK	Grass	(Australia) Dick Crealy	6–3, 6–4
Win	2–0	Jul 1974	Dublin, Ireland	Hard	(Rhodesia) Colin Dowdeswell	6–3, 9–8
Loss	2–1	Aug 1975	Cincinnati, US	Clay	(United States) Tom Gorman	5–7, 6–2, 4–6

Source: ATP

=== Doubles: 97 (53 wins / 44 losses) ===
Result	W–L	Year	Tournament	Surface	Partner	Opponents	Score
Win	1–0	Oct 1972	Tokyo Outdoor, Japan	Hard	(United States) Dick Dell	(Mexico) Marcello Lara (New Zealand) Jeff Simpson	6–3, 6–2
Win	2–0	Oct 1973	Manila, Philippines	Hard	(Mexico) Marcelo Lara	(West Germany) Jürgen Fassbender (West Germany) Hans-Jürgen Pohmann	6–2, 6–0
Win	3–0	Apr 1974	Tucson, US	Hard	(United States) Charlie Pasarell	(United States) Tom Edlefsen (Spain) Manuel Orantes	6–4, 6–4
Win	4–0	Aug 1974	Cincinnati, US	Hard	(United States) Dick Dell	(United States) James Delaney (United States) John Whitlinger	4–6, 7–6, 6–2
Win	5–0	Sep 1975	San Francisco, US	Carpet	(United States) Fred McNair	(Australia) Allan Stone (Australia) Kim Warwick	6–2, 7–6^{(7–3)}
Win	6–0	Oct 1975	Maui, US	Hard	(United States) Fred McNair	(United States) Jeff Borowiak (Pakistan) Haroon Rahim	3–6, 7–6, 6–3
Win	7–0	Feb 1976	Dayton, US	Carpet	(Australia) Ray Ruffels	(Chile) Jaime Fillol (United States) Charlie Pasarell	6–2, 3–6, 7–5
Win	8–0	Feb 1976	Salisbury, US	Carpet	(United States) Fred McNair	(United States) Steve Krulevitz (United States) Trey Waltke	6–3, 6–2
Win	9–0	Apr 1976	Sacramento, US	Carpet	(United States) Tom Gorman	(United States) Mike Cahill (United States) John Whitlinger	3–6, 6–4, 6–4
Win	10–0	May 1976	Hamburg, Germany	Clay	(United States) Fred McNair	(Australia) Dick Crealy (Australia) Kim Warwick	7–6, 7–6, 7–6
Win	11–0	Jun 1976	French Open, Paris	Clay	(United States) Fred McNair	(United States) Brian Gottfried (Mexico) Raúl Ramírez	7–6, 6–3, 6–1
Win	12–0	Jul 1976	Båstad, Sweden	Clay	(United States) Fred McNair	(Poland) Wojciech Fibak (Spain) Juan Gisbert, Sr.	6–3, 6–4
Loss	12–1	Aug 1976	Columbus, US	Hard	(United States) Fred McNair	(United States) William Brown (United States) Brian Teacher	3–6, 4–6
Loss	12–2	Aug 1976	Indianapolis, US	Clay	(United States) Fred McNair	(United States) Brian Gottfried (Mexico) Raúl Ramírez	2–6, 2–6
Loss	12–3	Oct 1976	Paris Indoor, France	Hard (i)	(United States) Fred McNair	(Netherlands) Tom Okker (United States) Marty Riessen	2–6, 2–6
Win	13–3	Nov 1976	Johannesburg, South Africa	Hard	(United States) Brian Gottfried	(Spain) Juan Gisbert, Sr. (United States) Stan Smith	1–6, 6–1, 6–2, 7–6
Win	14–3	Dec 1976	Masters, Houston, US	Carpet	(United States) Fred McNair	(United States) Brian Gottfried (Mexico) Raúl Ramírez	6–3, 5–7, 5–7, 6–4, 6–4
Win	15–3	Mar 1977	Memphis, US	Carpet	(United States) Fred McNair	(United States) Robert Lutz (United States) Stan Smith	4–6, 7–6, 7–6
Loss	15–4	May 1977	Rome, Italy	Clay	(United States) Fred McNair	(United States) Brian Gottfried (Mexico) Raúl Ramírez	7–6, 6–7, 5–7
Loss	15–5	Jul 1977	Washington, D.C., US	Clay	(United States) Fred McNair	(Australia) John Alexander (Australia) Phil Dent	5–7, 5–7
Loss	15–6	Aug 1977	North Conway, US	Clay	(United States) Fred McNair	(United States) Brian Gottfried (Mexico) Raúl Ramírez	5–7, 3–6
Loss	15–7	Aug 1977	Toronto, Canada	Hard	(United States) Fred McNair	(South Africa) Bob Hewitt (Mexico) Raúl Ramírez	4–6, 6–3, 2–6
Loss	15–8	Oct 1977	San Francisco, US	Carpet	(United States) Fred McNair	(United States) Marty Riessen (United States) Dick Stockton	4–6, 6–1, 4–6
Loss	15–9	Nov 1977	Cologne, Germany	Carpet	(United States) Fred McNair	(South Africa) Bob Hewitt (South Africa) Frew McMillan	3–6, 5–7
Win	16–9	Nov 1977	Oviedo, Spain	Hard	(United States) Fred McNair	(Czechoslovakia) Jan Kodeš (Mexico) Raúl Ramírez	6–3, 6–1
Loss	16–10	Feb 1978	Denver, US	Carpet	(United States) Fred McNair	(South Africa) Bob Hewitt (South Africa) Frew McMillan	3–6, 2–6
Win	17–10	Apr 1978	Guadalajara, Mexico	Clay	(United States) Sandy Mayer	(United States) Gene Mayer (India) Sashi Menon	4–6, 7–6, 6–3
Loss	17–11	Jul 1978	Forest Hills WCT, US	Clay	(United States) Fred McNair	(Australia) John Alexander (Australia) Phil Dent	6–7, 6–7
Loss	17–12	Sep 1978	US Open, New York	Hard	(United States) Marty Riessen	(United States) Stan Smith (United States) Robert Lutz	6–1, 5–7, 3–6
Loss	17–13	Sep 1978	Woodlands Doubles, US	Hard	(United States) Marty Riessen	(Poland) Wojciech Fibak (Netherlands) Tom Okker	6–7, 6–3, 6–4, 6–7, 3–6
Win	18–13	Nov 1978	Taipei, Taiwan	Carpet	(United States) Butch Walts	(Australia) Mark Edmondson (Australia) John Marks	6–2, 6–7, 7–6
Win	19–13	Nov 1978	Manila, Philippines	Clay	(United States) Brian Teacher	(Australia) Ross Case (Australia) Chris Kachel	6–3, 7–6
Win	20–13	Dec 1978	Calcutta, India	Clay	(India) Sashi Menon	(France) Gilles Moretton (France) Yannick Noah	7–6, 6–4
Win	21–13	Dec 1978	Sydney Outdoor, Australia	Grass	(United States) Hank Pfister	(Australia) Syd Ball (Australia) Bob Carmichael	6–4, 6–4
Loss	21–14	Jan 1979	World Doubles WCT, London	Carpet	(Romania) Ilie Năstase	(United States) Peter Fleming (United States) John McEnroe	6–3, 2–6, 3–6, 1–6
Win	22–14	Jan 1979	Baltimore WCT, US	Carpet	(United States) Marty Riessen	(India) Anand Amritraj (South Africa) Cliff Drysdale	7–6, 6–4
Win	23–14	Apr 1979	Houston, US	Clay	(United States) Gene Mayer	(Australia) John Alexander (Australia) Geoff Masters	6–1, 5–7, 6–4
Win	24–14	Apr 1979	Las Vegas, US	Hard	(United States) Marty Riessen	(Italy) Adriano Panatta (Mexico) Raúl Ramírez	4–6, 6–4, 7–6
Loss	24–15	Jun 1979	London/Queen's Club, UK	Grass	(United States) Marty Riessen	(United States) Tim Gullikson (United States) Tom Gullikson	4–6, 4–6
Win	25–15	Jul 1979	Washington, D.C., US	Clay	(United States) Marty Riessen	(United States) Brian Gottfried (Mexico) Raúl Ramírez	2–6, 6–3, 6–4
Win	26–15	Jul 1979	Louisville, US	Hard	(United States) Marty Riessen	(India) Vijay Amritraj (Mexico) Raúl Ramírez	6–2, 1–6, 6–1
Win	27–15	Aug 1979	Lafayette, US	Carpet	(United States) Marty Riessen	(United States) Victor Amaya (United States) Eric Friedler	6–4, 6–4
Win	28–15	Sep 1979	Woodlands Doubles, US	Hard	(United States) Marty Riessen	(Australia) Bob Carmichael (United States) Tim Gullikson	6–3, 2–2, RET.
Win	29–15	Sep 1979	Los Angeles, US	Carpet	(United States) Marty Riessen	(Poland) Wojciech Fibak (South Africa) Frew McMillan	6–4, 6–4
Win	30–15	Nov 1979	Tokyo Indoor, Japan	Carpet	(United States) Marty Riessen	(United States) Mike Cahill (United States) Terry Moor	6–4, 7–6
Win	31–15	Nov 1979	Buenos Aires, Argentina	Clay	(Czechoslovakia) Tomáš Šmíd	(Brazil) Marcos Hocevar (Brazil) João Soares	6–1, 7–5
Loss	31–16	Apr 1980	Houston, US	Clay	(United States) Marty Riessen	(Australia) Peter McNamara (Australia) Paul McNamee	4–6, 4–6
Loss	31–17	Jun 1980	London/Queen's Club, UK	Grass	(Australia) Paul McNamee	(Australia) Rod Frawley (Australia) Geoff Masters	2–6, 6–4, 9–11
Loss	31–18	Nov 1980	Tokyo Indoor, Japan	Carpet	(United States) Marty Riessen	(United States) Victor Amaya (United States) Hank Pfister	3–6, 6–3, 6–7
Win	32–18	Feb 1981	Philadelphia, US	Carpet	(United States) Marty Riessen	(United States) Brian Gottfried (Mexico) Raúl Ramírez	6–2, 6–2
Win	33–18	Apr 1981	Houston, US	Clay	(Australia) Mark Edmondson	(India) Anand Amritraj (United States) Fred McNair	6–4, 6–3
Loss	33–19	Sep 1981	San Francisco, US	Carpet	(Australia) Mark Edmondson	(United States) Peter Fleming (United States) John McEnroe	6–7, 4–6
Loss	33–20	Oct 1981	Sydney Indoor, Australia	Hard (i)	(United States) Ferdi Taygan	(United States) Peter Fleming (United States) John McEnroe	7–6, 6–7, 1–6
Loss	33–21	Oct 1981	Melbourne Indoor, Australia	Carpet	(United States) Ferdi Taygan	(Australia) Paul Kronk (Australia) Peter McNamara	6–3, 3–6, 4–6
Loss	33–22	Nov 1981	Stockholm, Sweden	Hard (i)	(United States) Ferdi Taygan	(South Africa) Kevin Curren (United States) Steve Denton	7–6, 4–6, 0–6
Win	34–22	Nov 1981	Wembley, UK	Carpet	(United States) Ferdi Taygan	(United States) Peter Fleming (United States) John McEnroe	7–5, 6–7, 6–4
Win	35–22	Jan 1982	Mexico City WCT, Mexico	Carpet	(United States) Ferdi Taygan	(Czechoslovakia) Tomáš Šmíd (Hungary) Balázs Taróczy	6–4, 7–5
Loss	35–23	Jan 1982	Philadelphia, US	Carpet	(United States) Ferdi Taygan	(United States) Peter Fleming (United States) John McEnroe	6–7, 4–6
Win	36–23	Mar 1982	Brussels, Belgium	Carpet	(Czechoslovakia) Pavel Složil	(United States) Tracy Delatte (United States) Chris Dunk	6–4, 6–7, 7–5
Win	37–23	Mar 1982	Rotterdam, Netherlands	Carpet	(Australia) Mark Edmondson	(United States) Fritz Buehning (South Africa) Kevin Curren	7–5, 6–2
Loss	37–24	Mar 1982	Milan, Italy	Carpet	(Australia) Mark Edmondson	(Switzerland) Heinz Günthardt (Australia) Peter McNamara	6–7, 6–7
Loss	37–25	Apr 1982	Monte Carlo, Monaco	Clay	(Australia) Mark Edmondson	(Australia) Paul McNamee (Australia) Peter McNamara	7–6, 6–7, 3–6
Win	38–25	Apr 1982	Los Angeles, US	Hard	(United States) Ferdi Taygan	(United States) Bruce Manson (United States) Brian Teacher	6–1, 6–7, 6–3
Win	39–25	Apr 1982	Las Vegas, US	Hard	(United States) Ferdi Taygan	(Brazil) Carlos Kirmayr (United States) Van Winitsky	7–6, 6–4
Win	40–25	Jun 1982	French Open, Paris	Clay	(United States) Ferdi Taygan	(Chile) Hans Gildemeister (Chile) Belus Prajoux	7–5, 6–3, 1–1, RET.
Win	41–25	Aug 1982	North Conway, US	Clay	(United States) Ferdi Taygan	(Peru) Pablo Arraya (United States) Eric Fromm	6–2, 7–6
Win	42–25	Aug 1982	Indianapolis, US	Clay	(United States) Ferdi Taygan	(South Africa) Robbie Venter (United States) Blaine Willenborg	6–4, 7–5
Win	43–25	Oct 1982	Tokyo Outdoor, Japan	Clay	(United States) Ferdi Taygan	(United States) Tim Gullikson (United States) Tom Gullikson	6–1, 3–6, 7–6
Loss	43–26	Nov 1982	Stockholm, Sweden	Hard (i)	(United States) Ferdi Taygan	(United States) Mark Dickson (Sweden) Jan Gunnarsson	6–7, 7–6, 4–6
Loss	43–27	Jan 1983	Masters, New York City	Carpet	(United States) Ferdi Taygan	(United States) Peter Fleming (United States) John McEnroe	5–7, 3–6
Win	44–27	Apr 1983	Bournemouth, UK	Clay	(Czechoslovakia) Tomáš Šmíd	(Switzerland) Heinz Günthardt (Hungary) Balázs Taróczy	7–6, 7–5
Loss	44–28	Jun 1983	French Open, Paris	Clay	(Australia) Mark Edmondson	(Sweden) Anders Järryd (Sweden) Hans Simonsson	6–7, 4–6, 2–6
Win	45–28	Jul 1983	North Conway, US	Clay	(Australia) Mark Edmondson	(United States) Eric Fromm (United States) Drew Gitlin	7–6, 6–1
Win	46–28	Aug 1983	Indianapolis, US	Clay	(Australia) Mark Edmondson	(Brazil) Carlos Kirmayr (Brazil) Cássio Motta	6–3, 6–2
Loss	46–29	Sep 1983	Dallas, US	Hard	(United States) Steve Denton	(Nigeria) Nduka Odizor (United States) Van Winitsky	3–6, 5–7
Win	47–29	Oct 1983	Sydney Indoor, Australia	Hard (i)	(Australia) Mark Edmondson	(United States) John McEnroe (United States) Peter Rennert	6–2, 6–4
Win	48–29	Oct 1983	Tokyo Indoor, Japan	Carpet	(Australia) Mark Edmondson	(United States) Steve Denton (Australia) John Fitzgerald	6–1, 6–4
Loss	48–30	Nov 1983	Wembley, UK	Carpet	(United States) Steve Denton	(United States) Peter Fleming (United States) John McEnroe	3–6, 4–6
Loss	48–31	Nov 1983	Johannesburg, South Africa	Hard	(Ecuador) Andrés Gómez	(United States) Steve Meister (United States) Brian Teacher	7–6, 6–7, 2–6
Loss	48–32	Dec 1983	Australian Open, Melbourne	Grass	(United States) Steve Denton	(Australia) Mark Edmondson (Australia) Paul McNamee	3–6, 6–7
Win	49–32	Apr 1984	Boca West, US	Hard	(Australia) Mark Edmondson	(United States) David Dowlen (Nigeria) Nduka Odizor	4–6, 6–1, 6–4
Loss	49–33	Apr 1984	Luxembourg	Carpet	(Australia) Mark Edmondson	(Sweden) Anders Järryd (Czechoslovakia) Tomáš Šmíd	3–6, 5–7
Win	50–33	Apr 1984	Monte Carlo, Monaco	Clay	(Australia) Mark Edmondson	(Sweden) Jan Gunnarsson (Sweden) Mats Wilander	6–2, 6–1
Loss	50–34	Oct 1984	Sydney Indoor, Australia	Hard (i)	(Australia) Mark Edmondson	(Sweden) Anders Järryd (Sweden) Hans Simonsson	4–6, 4–6
Loss	50–35	Oct 1984	Tokyo Indoor, Japan	Carpet	(Australia) Mark Edmondson	(United States) Tony Giammalva (United States) Sammy Giammalva Jr.	6–7, 4–6
Loss	50–36	Nov 1984	Treviso, Italy	Clay	(Sweden) Jan Gunnarsson	(Czechoslovakia) Pavel Složil (United States) Tim Wilkison	2–6, 3–6
Win	51–36	Dec 1984	Australian Open, Melbourne	Grass	(Australia) Mark Edmondson	(Sweden) Joakim Nyström (Sweden) Mats Wilander	6–2, 6–2, 7–5
Loss	51–37	Jan 1985	New York, United States	Carpet	(Australia) Mark Edmondson	(United States) Peter Fleming (United States) John McEnroe	3–6, 1–6
Loss	51–38	Feb 1985	Delray Beach, US	Hard	(Australia) Kim Warwick	(United States) Paul Annacone (South Africa) Christo van Rensburg	5–7, 5–7, 4–6
Loss	51–39	Mar 1986	La Quinta, US	Hard	(France) Yannick Noah	(Sweden) Stefan Edberg (Sweden) Anders Järryd	4–6, 3–6
Loss	51–40	May 1986	Indianapolis, US	Clay	(Australia) John Fitzgerald	(Chile) Hans Gildemeister (Ecuador) Andrés Gómez	4–6, 6–7
Loss	51–41	May 1986	Rome, Italy	Clay	(Australia) Mark Edmondson	(France) Guy Forget (France) Yannick Noah	6–7, 2–6
Win	52–41	Nov 1986	Stockholm, Sweden	Hard (i)	(Australia) Kim Warwick	(Australia) Pat Cash (Socialist Federal Republic of Yugoslavia) Slobodan Živojinović	6–4, 6–4
Loss	52–42	Nov 1986	Wembley, UK	Carpet	(Australia) Kim Warwick	(United States) Peter Fleming (United States) John McEnroe	6–3, 6–7, 2–6
Loss	52–43	Nov 1986	Johannesburg, South Africa	Hard (i)	(Ecuador) Andrés Gómez	(United States) Mike De Palmer (South Africa) Christo van Rensburg	6–3, 2–6, 6–7
Win	53–43	Mar 1987	Orlando, US	Hard	(Australia) Kim Warwick	(United States) Paul Annacone (South Africa) Christo van Rensburg	2–6, 7–6, 6–4
Loss	53–44	Mar 1988	Orlando, US	Hard	(Australia) Kim Warwick	(France) Guy Forget (France) Yannick Noah	4–6, 4–6

Source: ATP
