= Paul Annacone =

American tennis player and coach

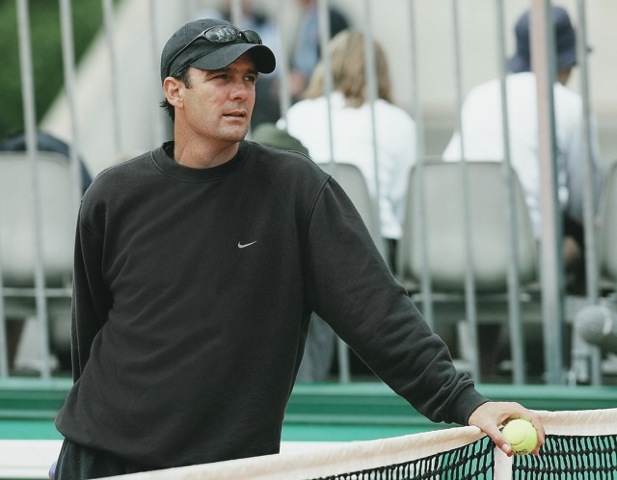
- Paul Annacone
- Country (sports): United States
- Residence: Los Angeles, California
- Born: March 20, 1963 (age 63) Southampton, New York
- Height: 6 ft 1 in (1.85 m)
- Turned pro: 1984
- Retired: 1998
- Plays: Right-handed (one-handed backhand)
- College: University of Tennessee
- Prize money: $1,645,515

Singles
- Career record: 157–131
- Career titles: 3
- Highest ranking: No. 12 (March 3, 1986)

Grand Slam singles results
- Australian Open: 4R (1987)
- French Open: 3R (1988)
- Wimbledon: QF (1984)
- US Open: 3R (1985, 1990)

Other tournaments
- Tour Finals: 1R (1985)
- WCT Finals: QF (1986)

Doubles
- Career record: 267–177
- Career titles: 14
- Highest ranking: No. 3 (April 6, 1987)

Grand Slam doubles results
- Australian Open: W (1985)
- French Open: QF (1985)
- Wimbledon: SF (1986)
- US Open: F (1990)

Coaching career (1995–)
- Pete Sampras 1995–2002; Tim Henman 2003–2007; (United Kingdom) Great Britain Davis Cup team 2008–2010; Roger Federer 2010–2013; Sloane Stephens 2013–July 2014; Stan Wawrinka 2017; Taylor Fritz 2018 – present

Coaching achievements
- Coachee singles titles total: 37
- Coachee doubles titles total: 2
- List of notable tournaments (with champion): (United States) 1995 Davis Cup champion (Sampras); Pete Sampras career statistics (from 1995); 2003 BNP Paribas Masters (Henman); 2004 Monte Carlo Masters (Henman doubles); 2010 ATP World Tour Finals (Federer); 2011 ATP World Tour Finals (Federer); 2012 Wimbledon (Federer)

Coaching awards and records
- Awards Coach Jim Verdieck Touring Pro Coach of the Year 2007 Records Pete Sampras#Records and achievements (from 1995)

Paul Annacone (born March 20, 1963) is an American former touring professional tennis player and current tennis coach. He is the former coach of 20-time Grand Slam winner Roger Federer, 14-time Grand Slam winner Pete Sampras, and 2017 US Open champion Sloane Stephens. Annacone is currently a coach at ProTennisCoach.com, a commentator at Tennis Channel, and works with Taylor Fritz.

== Career ==
=== Player ===
==== High school ====
As an eighth grader, Paul played first singles for Shoreham-Wading River High School and was undefeated in league play. Annacone graduated from East Hampton High School in 1981.

==== College ====
After graduating from East Hampton, the 6'1, 175 lbs. Annacone played three years of college tennis for the University of Tennessee in the Southeastern Conference over 1982–84. He was named the Intercollegiate Tennis Association Player of the Year in 1984. Annacone played 51–3 in singles while winning the ITA Indoor Singles Championship that year. He was named all-SEC and all-American all three years of his college career with the Volunteers, amassing a 115–22 career singles record.

==== Professional ====
The right-handed Annacone achieved his career best singles ranking in 1985 of world No. 12 and US No. 6. A serve-and-volleyer who would often chip and charge when returning serve, Annacone played on the ATP tour until 1992, amassing a career singles win-lose record of 157–131 in Grand Slam, Grand Prix, and ATP Tour events. He won three singles titles during his career and was a Wimbledon quarter-finalist in 1984.

Annacone won more as a pro playing doubles, capturing 14 tournaments and achieving a high ranking in 1987 of world No. 3. With long-time partner Christo van Rensburg, Annacone won the 1985 Australian Open doubles title. Teamed with David Wheaton, Annacone was a 1990 US Open finalist, as well.

=== Coaching ===
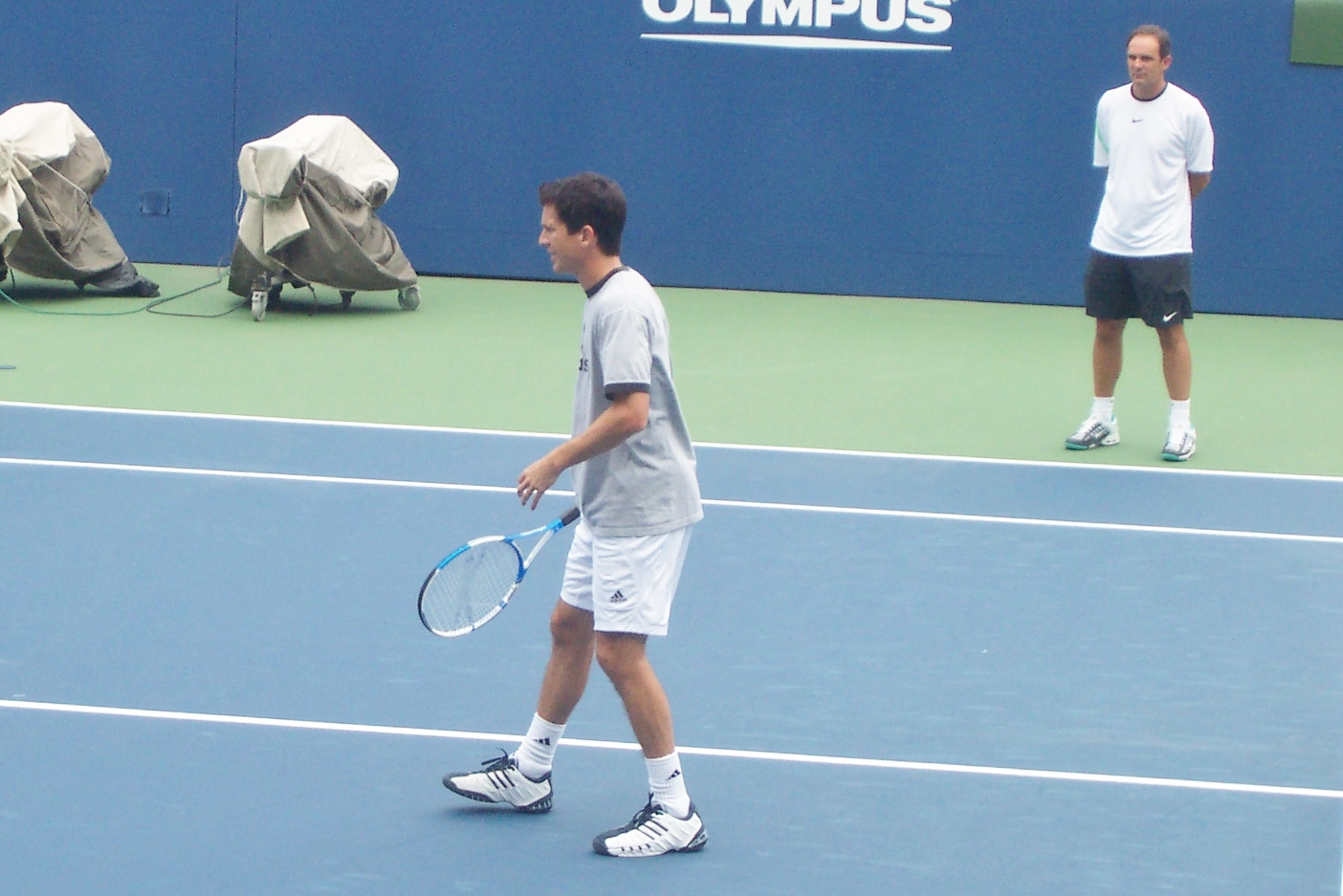
Annacone coaching Tim Henman

Annacone achieved even greater success as Pete Sampras's long-time coach. Initially hired to coach Sampras while his current coach Tim Gullikson recovered from a brain tumour, Gullikson educated and mentored Annacone on how to coach Sampras for fifteen months while he battled with brain cancer.

The two worked together from January 1995 until December 2001, and again from July 2002 until Sampras' retirement. From December 2001 to January 2003 Annacone was managing director of the United States Tennis Association High Performance Program. He coached Tim Henman, beginning at the Paris Masters in 2003 (which Henman won) until the end of Henman's career in September 2007.

Annacone became the Lawn Tennis Association's Head Coach in November 2006. He also became Great Britain Davis Cup team coach in April 2008, following the resignation of Peter Lundgren, while staying on with the LTA. Under his control the team lost in the 2008 Davis Cup World Group play-offs against Austria. The following year they got relegated to Group II. In May 2010, Annacone announced his official departure from November 2010 onwards from the LTA and the British Davis Cup team after losing to Lithuania in Group II first round.

Paul Annacone was hired by Roger Federer to be his full-time coach on August 28, 2010, after a successful one-month trial period. Annacone led Federer to two straight year-end championship in 2010 and 2011, a return to the world No. 1 ranking, and his seventh Wimbledon Championships.

In 2006 Annacone released the Paul Annacone Tactical Tennis DVD Series; a 4-DVD collection that demonstrates the strategies used by the pros in actual match situations. Attack the All-Court Player, Beat the Baseliner, Know Your Own Game, and Neutralize the Net-Rusher present numerous scenarios along with drills and practice games for improving match-specific strategy on both sides of the net.

In 2013, Annacone became a resident coach at ProTennisCoach.com – an online professional coaching site.

In November 2013, it was announced that Annacone had begun working with American rising star Sloane Stephens on a trial basis. She was ranked the world's number-12-player at the time. However, the two ended the relationship in July 2014.

Annacone is also involved with PlaySight Interactive, a sports technology company, where he works together with Darren Cahill on the Coaching and Player Development team.

In 2017, Annacone joined Stan Wawrinka's team for the grass court swing. Since the 2018 season Annacone has been coaching Taylor Fritz.

== Personal life ==
Both of Annacone's parents were educators. His father was a superintendent at schools for thirty five years, as a professor and a teacher. His mother was a guidance councillor. Three more mentors were his brother, who is a coach and teacher, Nick Bollettieri and Mike DePalmer Sr. All five of these people played a unique role in shaping Annacone's success as a coach.

Paul's son Nicholas attended his father's alma mater. His daughter, Olivia, attended the University of California, Los Angeles.

Annacone resides in Woodland Hills, California with his wife, Elisabeth Annacone, and son Emmett. He was inducted into the Suffolk Sports Hall of Fame on Long Island in the Tennis Category with the Class of 1996.

== Career finals ==
=== Singles: 6 (3 wins / 3 losses) ===
Legend Grand Slam (0) Tennis Masters Cup (0) ATP Masters Series (0) Grand Prix (3)	Titles by surface Hard (1) Clay (0) Grass (0) Carpet (2)

Result	W/L	Date	Tournament	Surface	Opponent	Score
Loss	0–1	Apr 1985	WCT Atlanta, Georgia, U.S.	Carpet (i)	(United States) John McEnroe	6–7^{(2–7)}, 6–7^{(5–7)}, 2–6
Win	1–1	Sep 1985	Los Angeles, California, U.S.	Hard	(Sweden) Stefan Edberg	7–6^{(7–5)}, 6–7^{(8–10)}, 7–6^{(7–4)}
Win	2–1	Oct 1985	Brisbane, Australia	Carpet (i)	(New Zealand) Kelly Evernden	6–3, 6–3
Loss	2–2	Oct 1985	Melbourne, Australia	Carpet (i)	(United States) Marty Davis	4–6, 4–6
Loss	2–3	Jul 1988	Stratton Mountain, U.S.	Hard	(United States) Andre Agassi	2–6, 4–6
Win	3–3	Oct 1989	Vienna, Austria	Carpet (i)	(New Zealand) Kelly Evernden	6–7^{(5–7)}, 6–4, 6–1, 2–6, 6–3

=== Doubles: 30 (14 wins / 16 losses) ===
Legend Grand Slam (1) Tennis Masters Cup (0) ATP Masters Series (1) Grand Prix (12)	Titles by surface Hard (5) Clay (1) Grass (2) Carpet (6)

Result	W/L	Date	Tournament	Surface	Partner	Opponents	Score
Loss	0–1	Oct 1983	Cologne, West Germany	Carpet (i)	(United States) Eric Korita	(Romania) Florin Segărceanu (United States) Nick Saviano	3–6, 4–6
Loss	0–2	Jul 1984	Livingston, U.S.	Hard	(Canada) Glenn Michibata	(United States) Scott Davis (United States) Ben Testerman	4–6, 4–6
Win	1–2	Dec 1984	Sydney Outdoor, Australia	Grass	(South Africa) Christo van Rensburg	(United States) Tom Gullikson (United States) Scott McCain	7–6, 7–5
Win	2–2	Feb 1985	Delray Beach, U.S.	Hard	(South Africa) Christo van Rensburg	(United States) Sherwood Stewart (Australia) Kim Warwick	7–5, 7–5, 6–4
Win	3–2	Apr 1985	Atlanta, U.S.	Carpet (i)	(South Africa) Christo van Rensburg	(United States) Steve Denton (Czechoslovakia) Tomáš Šmíd	6–4, 6–3
Loss	3–3	Apr 1985	Las Vegas, U.S.	Hard	(South Africa) Christo van Rensburg	(Australia) Pat Cash (Australia) John Fitzgerald	6–7, 7–6, 6–7
Loss	3–4	Jul 1985	Newport, U.S.	Grass	(South Africa) Christo van Rensburg	(Australia) Peter Doohan (United States) Sammy Giammalva Jr.	1–6, 3–6
Loss	3–5	Sep 1985	Los Angeles, U.S.	Hard	(South Africa) Christo van Rensburg	(United States) Scott Davis (United States) Robert Van't Hof	3–6, 6–7
Win	4–5	Sep 1985	San Francisco, U.S.	Carpet	(South Africa) Christo van Rensburg	(United States) Brad Gilbert (United States) Sandy Mayer	3–6, 6–3, 6–4
Win	5–5	Nov 1985	Australian Open, Melbourne	Grass	(South Africa) Christo van Rensburg	(Australia) Mark Edmondson (Australia) Kim Warwick	3–6, 7–6, 6–4, 6–4
Loss	5–6	Jan 1986	WCT World Doubles, UK	Carpet (i)	(South Africa) Christo van Rensburg	(Switzerland) Heinz Günthardt (Hungary) Balázs Taróczy	4–6, 6–1, 6–7, 7–6, 4–6
Loss	5–7	Aug 1986	Stratton Mountain, U.S.	Hard	(South Africa) Christo van Rensburg	(United States) Peter Fleming (United States) John McEnroe	3–6, 6–3, 3–6
Win	6–7	Feb 1987	Key Biscayne, U.S.	Hard	(South Africa) Christo van Rensburg	(United States) Ken Flach (United States) Robert Seguso	6–2, 6–4, 6–4
Loss	6–8	Mar 1987	Orlando, U.S.	Hard	(South Africa) Christo van Rensburg	(United States) Sherwood Stewart (Australia) Kim Warwick	6–2, 6–7, 4–6
Win	7–8	Mar 1987	Chicago, U.S.	Carpet (i)	(South Africa) Christo van Rensburg	(United States) Mike De Palmer (United States) Gary Donnelly	6–3, 7–6^{(7–4)}
Win	8–8	Apr 1987	Tokyo Outdoor, Japan	Hard	(United States) Kevin Curren	(Ecuador) Andrés Gómez (Sweden) Anders Järryd	6–4, 7–6
Loss	8–9	Jul 1988	Schenectady, U.S.	Hard	(United States) Patrick McEnroe	(West Germany) Alexander Mronz (United States) Greg Van Emburgh	3–6, 7–6, 5–7
Win	9–9	Oct 1988	Paris Indoor, France	Carpet (i)	(Australia) John Fitzgerald	(United States) Jim Grabb (South Africa) Christo van Rensburg	6–2, 6–2
Loss	9–10	Oct 1988	Stockholm, Sweden	Hard (i)	(Australia) John Fitzgerald	(United States) Kevin Curren (United States) Jim Grabb	5–7, 4–6
Win	10–10	Feb 1989	Memphis, U.S.	Hard (i)	(South Africa) Christo van Rensburg	(United States) Scott Davis (United States) Tim Wilkison	7–6, 6–7, 6–1
Win	11–10	Feb 1989	Philadelphia, U.S.	Carpet (i)	(South Africa) Christo van Rensburg	(United States) Rick Leach (United States) Jim Pugh	6–3, 7–5
Loss	11–11	Mar 1989	Scottsdale, U.S.	Hard	(South Africa) Christo van Rensburg	(United States) Rick Leach (United States) Jim Pugh	7–6, 3–6, 2–6, 6–2, 4–6
Loss	11–12	Sep 1989	San Francisco, U.S.	Carpet	(South Africa) Christo van Rensburg	(South Africa) Pieter Aldrich (South Africa) Danie Visser	4–6, 3–6
Loss	11–13	Oct 1989	Vienna, Austria	Carpet (i)	(New Zealand) Kelly Evernden	(Sweden) Jan Gunnarsson (Sweden) Anders Järryd	2–6, 3–6
Win	12–13	Jul 1990	Toronto, Canada	Hard	(United States) David Wheaton	(Australia) Broderick Dyke (Sweden) Peter Lundgren	6–1, 7–6
Loss	12–14	Aug 1990	US Open, New York	Hard	(United States) David Wheaton	(South Africa) Pieter Aldrich (South Africa) Danie Visser	2–6, 6–7^{(3–7)}, 2–6
Loss	12–15	Jul 1992	Newport, U.S.	Grass	(United States) David Wheaton	(South Africa) Royce Deppe (Czechoslovakia) David Rikl	4–6, 4–6
Win	13–15	Apr 1993	Atlanta, U.S.	Clay	(United States) Richey Reneberg	(United States) Todd Martin (United States) Jared Palmer	6–4, 7–6
Loss	13–16	May 1993	Coral Springs, U.S.	Clay	(United States) Doug Flach	(United States) Patrick McEnroe (United States) Jonathan Stark	4–6, 3–6
Win	14–16	Oct 1993	Beijing, China	Carpet (i)	(United States) Doug Flach	(Netherlands) Jacco Eltingh (Netherlands) Paul Haarhuis	7–6, 6–3

== Doubles performance timeline ==
Key
W	F	SF	QF	#R	RR	Q#	DNQ	A	NH

(W) winner; (F) finalist; (SF) semifinalist; (QF) quarterfinalist; (#R) rounds 4, 3, 2, 1; (RR) round-robin stage; (Q#) qualification round; (DNQ) did not qualify; (A) absent; (NH) not held; (SR) strike rate (events won / competed); (W–L) win–loss record.

Tournament	1984	1985	1986	1987	1988	1989	1990	1991	1992	1993	1994	1995	1996	1997	1998	1999	Career SR	Career win–loss
Grand Slam tournaments
Australian Open	A	W	NH	SF	3R	A	3R	A	1R	A	1R	2R	A	A	A	A	1 / 7	13–6
French Open	A	QF	A	2R	3R	A	A	1R	A	A	3R	A	A	A	A	A	0 / 5	8–5
Wimbledon	2R	QF	SF	QF	2R	1R	1R	QF	1R	1R	2R	A	A	A	A	A	0 / 11	16–11
U.S. Open	2R	3R	3R	QF	QF	SF	F	2R	1R	2R	3R	A	A	A	A	A	0 / 11	24–11
Grand Slam SR	0 / 2	1 / 4	0 / 2	0 / 4	0 / 4	0 / 2	0 / 3	0 / 3	0 / 3	0 / 2	0 / 4	0 / 1	0 / 0	0 / 0	0 / 0	0 / 0	1 / 34	N/A
Annual win–loss	2–2	13–3	6–2	10–4	8–4	4–2	7–3	4–3	0–3	1–2	5–4	1–1	0–0	0–0	0–0	0–0	N/A	61–33
ATP Masters Series
Indian Wells	These Tournaments Were Not Masters Series Events Before 1990						1R	A	2R	Q1	A	1R	A	A	A	A	0 / 3	1–3
Miami	These Tournaments Were Not Masters Series Events Before 1990						A	A	1R	SF	2R	A	A	A	A	A	0 / 3	5–2
Monte Carlo	These Tournaments Were Not Masters Series Events Before 1990						A	A	A	1R	A	A	A	A	1R	A	0 / 2	0–2
Rome	These Tournaments Were Not Masters Series Events Before 1990						A	A	A	A	A	A	A	A	A	A	0 / 0	0–0
Hamburg	These Tournaments Were Not Masters Series Events Before 1990						A	A	A	A	A	A	A	A	A	A	0 / 0	0–0
Canada	These Tournaments Were Not Masters Series Events Before 1990						W	1R	A	A	2R	A	A	A	A	A	1 / 3	6–2
Cincinnati	These Tournaments Were Not Masters Series Events Before 1990						A	1R	A	2R	A	A	A	A	A	A	0 / 2	1–2
Stuttgart (Stockholm)	These Tournaments Were Not Masters Series Events Before 1990						2R	A	A	A	A	A	A	A	A	A	0 / 1	1–1
Paris	These Tournaments Were Not Masters Series Events Before 1990						1R	A	A	A	A	A	A	A	A	A	0 / 1	0–1
Masters Series SR	N/A						1 / 4	0 / 2	0 / 2	0 / 3	0 / 2	0 / 1	0 / 0	0 / 0	0 / 1	0 / 0	1 / 15	N/A
Annual win–loss	N/A						7–3	0–2	0–2	5–2	2–2	0–1	0–0	0–0	0–1	0–0	N/A	14–13
Year-end ranking	76	5	26	9	21	18	29	217	247	72	97	514	-	-	1384	1357	N/A	
