= 1991 Volvo International – Doubles =

Doubles
- 1991 Volvo International
- 1990 Champions: (United States) Jeff Brown (United States) Scott Melville

Final
- Champions: (Czechoslovakia) Petr Korda (Australia) Wally Masur
- Runners-up: (United States) Jeff Brown (United States) Scott Melville
- Score: 7–5, 6–3

Details
- Draw: 28
- Seeds: 8

Events
Singles	Doubles
← 1990 ·	Volvo International	· 1992 →

Jeff Brown and Scott Melville were the defending champions but were forced to withdraw before the final against Petr Korda and Wally Masur.

== Seeds ==
Champion seeds are indicated in bold text while text in italics indicates the round in which those seeds were eliminated. The top four seeded teams received byes into the second round.

1. (Australia) Todd Woodbridge / (Australia) Mark Woodforde (quarterfinals)
2. (United States) Luke Jensen / (Australia) Laurie Warder (second round)
3. (Italy) Omar Camporese / (Croatia) Goran Ivanišević (quarterfinals)
4. (United States) Jim Grabb / (Australia) Mark Kratzmann (second round)
5. (Argentina) Javier Frana / (Mexico) Leonardo Lavalle (second round)
6. (United States) Jeff Brown / (United States) Scott Melville (final)
7. (United States) Charles Beckman / (Netherlands) Paul Haarhuis (semifinals)
8. (Czechoslovakia) **Petr Korda** / (Australia) **Wally Masur (champions)**

== Draw ==
=== Key ===
- Q = Qualifier
- WC = Wild card
- LL = Lucky loser
- Alt = Alternate
- SE = Special exempt
- PR = Protected ranking
- ITF = ITF entry
- JE = Junior exempt
- w/o = Walkover
- r = Retired
- d = Defaulted
- SR = Special ranking

=== Final ===
Final
6	(United States) Jeff Brown (United States) Scott Melville	5	3
8	(Czechoslovakia) **Petr Korda** (Australia) **Wally Masur**	**7**	**6**

=== Top half ===
First round
(Venezuela) A Mora (South Africa) B Talbot	**6**	3	4
WC	(Italy) **G Pozzi** (United States) **D Rostagno**	2	**6**	**6**
(United Kingdom) N Brown (United Kingdom) A Castle	6	2
(South Africa) **D Adams** (United States) **S Patridge**	**7**	**6**
(United States) P Annacone (South Africa) C van Rensburg	4	5
7	(United States) **C Beckman** (Netherlands) **P Haarhuis**	**6**	**7**
(Israel) G Bloom (United States) B Garrow	4	4
(Nigeria) **N Odizor** (United States) **B Shelton**	**6**	**6**
Q	(United States) **M Lucena** (Norway) **B-O Pedersen**	5	**6**	**6**
(United States) B Gilbert (United States) J McEnroe	**7**	4	2
(United States) S DeVries (Australia) D Macpherson	4	3
6	(United States) **J Brown** (United States) **S Melville**	**6**	**6**

Second round
1	(Australia) **T Woodbridge** (Australia) **M Woodforde**	**6**	**6**
WC	(Italy) G Pozzi (United States) D Rostagno	3	3
(South Africa) D Adams (United States) S Patridge	6	6
7	(United States) **C Beckman** (Netherlands) **P Haarhuis**	**7**	**7**
3	(Italy) **O Camporese** (Croatia) **G Ivanišević**	**6**	**6**
(Nigeria) N Odizor (United States) B Shelton	4	4
Q	(United States) M Lucena (Norway) B-O Pedersen	6	1
6	(United States) **J Brown** (United States) **S Melville**	**7**	**6**

Quarterfinals
1	(Australia) T Woodbridge (Australia) M Woodforde	4	2
7	(United States) **C Beckman** (Netherlands) **P Haarhuis**	**6**	**6**
3	(Italy) O Camporese (Croatia) G Ivanišević	**7**	3	6
6	(United States) **J Brown** (United States) **S Melville**	5	**6**	**7**

Semifinals
7	(United States) C Beckman (Netherlands) P Haarhuis	**6**	6	4
6	(United States) **J Brown** (United States) **S Melville**	4	**7**	**6**

=== Bottom half ===
First round
5	(Argentina) **J Frana** (Mexico) **L Lavalle**	**6**	**6**
Q	(Sweden) R Bergh (Sweden) J Svensson	4	2
(Netherlands) **R Krajicek** (Netherlands) **J Siemerink**	**6**	4	**6**
(Brazil) R Acioly (Sweden) O Jonsson	4	**6**	4
(Brazil) **L Mattar** (Brazil) **J Oncins**	**7**	**6**
(Belgium) L Pimek (Czechoslovakia) D Vacek	6	3
8	(Czechoslovakia) **P Korda** (Australia) **W Masur**	6	**6**	**6**
(United States) B Garnett (United States) R Van't Hof	**7**	4	2
(United States) **G Layendecker** (United States) **R Reneberg**	**6**	**6**
(United States) S Cannon (The Bahamas) R Smith	4	2
(Ecuador) **A Gómez** (Venezuela) **N Pereira**	**6**	3	**6**
WC	(United States) M Chang (United States) C Chang	4	**6**	3

Second round
5	(Argentina) J Frana (Mexico) L Lavalle	2	**6**	4
(Netherlands) **R Krajicek** (Netherlands) **J Siemerink**	**6**	3	**6**
(Brazil) **L Mattar** (Brazil) **J Oncins**	6	**7**	**6**
4	(United States) J Grabb (Australia) M Kratzmann	**7**	5	4
8	(Czechoslovakia) **P Korda** (Australia) **W Masur**	**7**	**6**
(United States) G Layendecker (United States) R Reneberg	6	3
(Ecuador) **A Gómez** (Venezuela) **N Pereira**	**6**	5	**6**
2	(United States) L Jensen (Australia) L Warder	2	**7**	4

Quarterfinals
(Netherlands) R Krajicek (Netherlands) J Siemerink
(Brazil) **L Mattar** (Brazil) **J Oncins**	w/o
8	(Czechoslovakia) **P Korda** (Australia) **W Masur**	3	**6**	**6**
(Ecuador) A Gómez (Venezuela) N Pereira	**6**	4	3

Semifinals
(Brazil) L Mattar (Brazil) J Oncins	3	5
8	(Czechoslovakia) **P Korda** (Australia) **W Masur**	**6**	**7**
