= 1990 Volvo International – Doubles =

Doubles
- 1990 Volvo International
- 1989 Champions: (Australia) Mark Kratzmann (Australia) Wally Masur

Final
- Champions: (United States) Jeff Brown (United States) Scott Melville
- Runners-up: (Socialist Federal Republic of Yugoslavia) Goran Ivanišević (Czechoslovakia) Petr Korda
- Score: 2–6, 7–5, 6–0

Details
- Draw: 28
- Seeds: 8

Events
Singles	Doubles
← 1989 ·	Volvo International	· 1991 →

Mark Kratzmann and Wally Masur were the defending champions but only Masur competed that year with Pat Cash.

Cash and Masur lost in the second round to Paul Annacone and David Wheaton.

Jeff Brown and Scott Melville won in the final 2–6, 7–5, 6–0 against Goran Ivanišević and Petr Korda.

== Seeds ==
Champion seeds are indicated in bold text while text in italics indicates the round in which those seeds were eliminated. The top four seeded teams received byes into the second round.

1. (United States) Rick Leach / (United States) Jim Pugh (semifinals)
2. (Socialist Federal Republic of Yugoslavia) Goran Ivanišević / (Czechoslovakia) Petr Korda (final)
3. (United States) Jim Grabb / (United States) Patrick McEnroe (second round)
4. (Australia) John Fitzgerald / (Sweden) Anders Järryd (quarterfinals)
5. (United States) Charles Beckman / (United States) Luke Jensen (second round)
6. (United States) Paul Annacone / (United States) David Wheaton (quarterfinals)
7. (Australia) Todd Woodbridge / (Australia) Mark Woodforde (first round)
8. (United States) Glenn Layendecker / (South Africa) Christo van Rensburg (second round)

== Draw ==
=== Key ===
- Q = Qualifier
- WC = Wild card
- LL = Lucky loser
- Alt = Alternate
- SE = Special exempt
- PR = Protected ranking
- ITF = ITF entry
- JE = Junior exempt
- w/o = Walkover
- r = Retired
- d = Defaulted
- SR = Special ranking

=== Final ===
Final
Q	(United States) **Jeff Brown** (United States) **Scott Melville**	2	**7**	**6**
2	(Socialist Federal Republic of Yugoslavia) Goran Ivanišević (Czechoslovakia) Petr Korda	**6**	5	0

=== Top half ===
First round
(United States) **B Pearce** (South Africa) **B Talbot**	4	**7**	**6**
(South Africa) M Barnard (Czechoslovakia) M Šrejber	**6**	6	2
(United States) **M Chang** (United States) **C Chang**	**6**	**6**
(United States) T Ho (United States) L Scott	3	0
(United States) **S DeVries** (Australia) **D Macpherson**	**6**	**6**
7	(Australia) T Woodbridge (Australia) M Woodforde	3	4
(Ecuador) A Gómez (Puerto Rico) M Nido	3	6
Q	(United States) **J Brown** (United States) **S Melville**	**6**	**7**
(United States) T Nelson (United States) B Shelton	4	3
(Australia) **P Cash** (Australia) **W Masur**	**6**	**6**
(South Africa) R Deppe (United States) B Garnett	2	6
6	(United States) **P Annacone** (United States) **D Wheaton**	**6**	**7**

Second round
1	(United States) **R Leach** (United States) **J Pugh**	3	**7**	**6**
(United States) B Pearce (South Africa) B Talbot	**6**	5	4
(United States) M Chang (United States) C Chang	6	1
(United States) **S DeVries** (Australia) **D Macpherson**	**7**	**6**
3	(United States) J Grabb (United States) P McEnroe	6	0
Q	(United States) **J Brown** (United States) **S Melville**	**7**	**6**
(Australia) P Cash (Australia) W Masur	4	3
6	(United States) **P Annacone** (United States) **D Wheaton**	**6**	**6**

Quarterfinals
1	(United States) **R Leach** (United States) **J Pugh**	**6**	**6**
(United States) S DeVries (Australia) D Macpherson	4	4
Q	(United States) **J Brown** (United States) **S Melville**	**6**	2	**7**
6	(United States) P Annacone (United States) D Wheaton	3	**6**	6

Semifinals
1	(United States) R Leach (United States) J Pugh	3	6
Q	(United States) **J Brown** (United States) **S Melville**	**6**	**7**

=== Bottom half ===
First round
5	(United States) **C Beckman** (United States) **L Jensen**	**6**	**6**
Q	(United States) J Arias (United States) E Teltscher	2	3
(Venezuela) **N Pereira** (United States) **D Rostagno**	**6**	**7**
(United States) E Amend (Venezuela) A Mora	1	6
(Italy) C Caratti (Mexico) L Herrera	1	6
(Australia) **N Borwick** (New Zealand) **D Lewis**	**6**	**7**
8	(United States) **G Layendecker** (South Africa) **C van Rensburg**	**7**	**6**
(United Kingdom) N Brown (Netherlands) M Schapers	6	3
(Australia) **S Barr** (The Bahamas) **R Smith**	6	**7**	**6**
(United States) D Cassidy (Peru) J Yzaga	**7**	5	4
(United States) P Chamberlin (United States) T Wilkison	4	2
(United States) **A Hombrecher** (United States) **M Washington**	**6**	**6**

Second round
5	(United States) C Beckman (United States) L Jensen	6	6
(Venezuela) **N Pereira** (United States) **D Rostagno**	**7**	**7**
(Australia) N Borwick (New Zealand) D Lewis	6	3
4	(Australia) **J Fitzgerald** (Sweden) **A Järryd**	**7**	**6**
8	(United States) G Layendecker (South Africa) C van Rensburg	**6**	6	4
(Australia) **S Barr** (The Bahamas) **R Smith**	4	**7**	**6**
(United States) A Hombrecher (United States) M Washington	4	5
2	(Socialist Federal Republic of Yugoslavia) **G Ivanišević** (Czechoslovakia) **P Korda**	**6**	**7**

Quarterfinals
(Venezuela) **N Pereira** (United States) **D Rostagno**	**7**	**7**
4	(Australia) J Fitzgerald (Sweden) A Järryd	5	6
(Australia) S Barr (The Bahamas) R Smith	6	**7**	6
2	(Socialist Federal Republic of Yugoslavia) **G Ivanišević** (Czechoslovakia) **P Korda**	**7**	6	**7**

Semifinals
(Venezuela) N Pereira (United States) D Rostagno	6	3
2	(Socialist Federal Republic of Yugoslavia) **G Ivanišević** (Czechoslovakia) **P Korda**	**7**	**6**
