= 1992 Volvo International – Doubles =

Doubles
- 1992 Volvo International
- 1991 Champions: (Czechoslovakia) Petr Korda (Australia) Wally Masur

Final
- Champions: (United States) Kelly Jones (United States) Rick Leach
- Runners-up: (United States) Patrick McEnroe (United States) Jared Palmer
- Score: 7–6, 6–7, 6–2

Details
- Draw: 28
- Seeds: 8

Events
Singles	Doubles
← 1991 ·	Volvo International	· 1993 →

Petr Korda and Wally Masur were the defending champions but they competed with different partners that year, Korda with Jim Pugh and Masur with Mark Kratzmann.

Korda and Pugh lost in the first round to Mark Knowles and Alex O'Brien.

Kratzmann and Masur lost in the quarterfinals to Stefan Edberg and John McEnroe.

Kelly Jones and Rick Leach won in the final 7–6, 6–7, 6–2 against Patrick McEnroe and Rick Leach.

== Seeds ==
Champion seeds are indicated in bold text while text in italics indicates the round in which those seeds were eliminated. The top four seeded teams received byes into the second round.

1. (Australia) Todd Woodbridge / (Australia) Mark Woodforde (second round)
2. (United States) **Kelly Jones** / (United States) **Rick Leach (champions)**
3. (Australia) Mark Kratzmann / (Australia) Wally Masur (quarterfinals)
4. (United States) Steve DeVries / (Australia) David Macpherson (semifinals)
5. (France) Guy Forget / (Switzerland) Jakob Hlasek (first round)
6. (Croatia) Goran Ivanišević / (Switzerland) Marc Rosset (second round)
7. (South Africa) David Adams / (Commonwealth of Independent States) Andrei Olhovskiy (quarterfinals)
8. (United States) Patrick McEnroe / (United States) Jared Palmer (final)

== Draw ==
=== Key ===
- Q = Qualifier
- WC = Wild card
- LL = Lucky loser
- Alt = Alternate
- SE = Special exempt
- PR = Protected ranking
- ITF = ITF entry
- JE = Junior exempt
- w/o = Walkover
- r = Retired
- d = Defaulted
- SR = Special ranking

=== Final ===
Final
8	(United States) Patrick McEnroe (United States) Jared Palmer	6	**7**	2
2	(United States) **Kelly Jones** (United States) **Rick Leach**	**7**	6	**6**

=== Top half ===
First round
(Italy) G Pozzi (Finland) O Rahnasto	2	2
(United States) **C Beckman** (Australia) **B Dyke**	**6**	**6**
(United States) M Jensen (Italy) D Nargiso	6	4
WC	(United States) **M Chang** (United States) **C Chang**	**7**	**6**
(United States) B Garnett (Sweden) T Svantesson	3	2
8	(United States) **P McEnroe** (United States) **J Palmer**	**6**	**6**
(United States) **T. J. Middleton** (United States) **T Scherman**	w/o
WC	(United States) B Shelton (United States) M Washington
LL	(United States) **J Arias** (United States) **M Blackman**	**7**	**6**
(Czechoslovakia) M Damm (Sweden) M Renström	5	4
WC	(Sweden) **S Edberg** (United States) **J McEnroe**	**6**	**7**
5	(France) G Forget (Switzerland) J Hlasek	3	6

Second round
1	(Australia) T Woodbridge (Australia) M Woodforde	6	**6**	3
(United States) **C Beckman** (Australia) **B Dyke**	**7**	0	**6**
WC	(United States) M Chang (United States) C Chang	3	1
8	(United States) **P McEnroe** (United States) **J Palmer**	**6**	**6**
3	(Australia) **M Kratzmann** (Australia) **W Masur**	3	**7**	**6**
(United States) T. J. Middleton (United States) T Scherman	**6**	6	3
LL	(United States) J Arias (United States) M Blackman	1	4
WC	(Sweden) **S Edberg** (United States) **J McEnroe**	**6**	**6**

Quarterfinals
(United States) C Beckman (Australia) B Dyke	1	3
8	(United States) **P McEnroe** (United States) **J Palmer**	**6**	**6**
3	(Australia) M Kratzmann (Australia) W Masur	3	5
WC	(Sweden) **S Edberg** (United States) **J McEnroe**	**6**	**7**

Semifinals
8	(United States) **P McEnroe** (United States) **J Palmer**	**6**	**6**
WC	(Sweden) S Edberg (United States) J McEnroe	3	2

=== Bottom half ===
First round
6	(Croatia) **G Ivanišević** (Switzerland) **M Rosset**	**6**	**6**
(United States) J Brown (Sweden) P Lundgren	4	4
WC	(Commonwealth of Independent States) A Cherkasov (Commonwealth of Independent States) A Volkov	**6**	3	2
(United States) **S Cannon** (United States) **G Van Emburgh**	3	**6**	**6**
(United States) **T Nelson** (Netherlands) **J Siemerink**	**6**	**6**
Q	(Israel) G Bloom (India) L Paes	4	3
7	(South Africa) **D Adams** (Commonwealth of Independent States) **A Olhovskiy**	**6**	**7**
(United States) D Eisenman (Norway) B-O Pedersen	3	6
(Italy) O Camporese (United States) B Gilbert	**7**	3	3
Q	(South Africa) **M Barnard** (United Kingdom) **M Petchey**	5	**6**	**6**
LL	(The Bahamas) **M Knowles** (United States) **A O'Brien**	**7**	**7**
(Czechoslovakia) P Korda (United States) J Pugh	6	6

Second round
6	(Croatia) G Ivanišević (Switzerland) M Rosset	6	**6**	2
(United States) **S Cannon** (United States) **G Van Emburgh**	**7**	4	**6**
(United States) T Nelson (Netherlands) J Siemerink	4	**6**	3
4	(United States) **S DeVries** (Australia) **D Macpherson**	**6**	3	**6**
7	(South Africa) **D Adams** (Commonwealth of Independent States) **A Olhovskiy**	**6**	2	**6**
Q	(South Africa) M Barnard (United Kingdom) M Petchey	3	**6**	3
LL	(The Bahamas) M Knowles (United States) A O'Brien	2	0
2	(United States) **K Jones** (United States) **R Leach**	**6**	**6**

Quarterfinals
(United States) S Cannon (United States) G Van Emburgh	5	**6**	5
4	(United States) **S DeVries** (Australia) **D Macpherson**	**7**	4	**7**
7	(South Africa) D Adams (Commonwealth of Independent States) A Olhovskiy	3	2
2	(United States) **K Jones** (United States) **R Leach**	**6**	**6**

Semifinals
4	(United States) S DeVries (Australia) D Macpherson	2	4
2	(United States) **K Jones** (United States) **R Leach**	**6**	**7**
