= 1993 Volvo International – Singles =

Singles
- 1993 Volvo International

Final
- Champion: (Ukraine) Andriy Medvedev
- Runner-up: (Czech Republic) Petr Korda
- Score: 7–5, 6–4

Events
Singles	Doubles
← 1992 ·	Volvo International	· 1994 →

The 1993 Volvo International was a tennis tournament played on outdoor hard courts at the Cullman-Heyman Tennis Center in New Haven, Connecticut, United States and was part of the Championship Series of the 1993 ATP Tour. The tournament ran from August 16 through August 23, 1993. Stefan Edberg was the defending champion but lost in the second round to Daniel Vacek. Andriy Medvedev won in the final 7–5, 6–4 against Petr Korda.

== Seeds ==
A champion seed is indicated in bold text while text in italics indicates the round in which that seed was eliminated. The top eight seeds received a bye to the second round.

1. (Sweden) Stefan Edberg (second round)
2. (United States) Ivan Lendl (quarterfinals)
3. (Netherlands) Richard Krajicek (third round)
4. (Czech Republic) Petr Korda (final)
5. (Ukraine) **Andriy Medvedev (champion)**
6. (Sweden) Henrik Holm (second round)
7. (Israel) Amos Mansdorf (third round)
8. (Australia) Mark Woodforde (quarterfinals)
9. (France) Arnaud Boetsch (first round)
10. (United States) Andre Agassi (semifinals)
11. (Switzerland) Marc Rosset (third round)
12. (Germany) Marc-Kevin Goellner (first round)
13. (Sweden) Jonas Svensson (quarterfinals)
14. (Australia) Richard Fromberg (first round)
15. (Netherlands) Jan Siemerink (first round)
16. (Germany) Carl-Uwe Steeb (first round)

== Draw ==
=== Key ===
- Q = Qualifier
- WC = Wild card
- LL = Lucky loser
- Alt = Alternate
- SE = Special exempt
- PR = Protected ranking
- ITF = ITF entry
- JE = Junior exempt
- w/o = Walkover
- r = Retired
- d = Defaulted
- SR = Special ranking

=== Finals ===
Semifinals
(Zimbabwe) Byron Black	3	1
4	(Czech Republic) **Petr Korda**	**6**	**6**
5	(Ukraine) **Andriy Medvedev**	**7^{7}**	3	**6**
10	(United States) Andre Agassi	6^{3}	**6**	4

Final
4	(Czech Republic) Petr Korda	5	4
5	(Ukraine) **Andriy Medvedev**	**7**	**6**

=== Top half ===
==== Section 1 ====
First round
(Chile) S Cortés	5	1
(Czech Republic) **D Vacek**	**7**	**6**
(Czech Republic) **M Damm**	**7**	3	**6**
(United Kingdom) J Bates	5	**6**	3
(Zimbabwe) **B Black**	**6**	**6**
16	(Germany) C-U Steeb	1	4
9	(France) A Boetsch	3	2
Q	(United States) **K Jones**	**6**	**6**
(South Africa) **G Stafford**	**7^{7}**	**6**
(Italy) D Nargiso	6^{1}	4
Q	(Armenia) **S Sargsian**	6^{6}	**7^{10}**	**6**
(United States) R Matuszewski	**7^{8}**	6^{8}	1

Second round
1	(Sweden) S Edberg	3	4
(Czech Republic) **D Vacek**	**6**	**6**
(Czech Republic) M Damm	**6**	1	5
(Zimbabwe) **B Black**	2	**6**	**7**
Q	(United States) **K Jones**	**6**	**6**
(South Africa) G Stafford	3	3
Q	(Armenia) S Sargsian	3	3
8	(Australia) **M Woodforde**	**6**	**6**

Third round
(Czech Republic) D Vacek	3	3
(Zimbabwe) **B Black**	**6**	**6**
Q	(United States) K Jones	0	3
8	(Australia) **M Woodforde**	**6**	**6**

Quarterfinals
(Zimbabwe) **B Black**	**6**	**6**
8	(Australia) M Woodforde	3	3

==== Section 2 ====
First round
(Morocco) Y El Aynaoui	**6**	5	3
(Russia) **A Olhovskiy**	3	**7**	**6**
(Italy) L Tieleman	5	1
Q	(South Africa) **M Kaplan**	**7**	**6**
(Canada) **C Pridham**	**6**	**6**
14	(Australia) R Fromberg	4	2
11	(Switzerland) **M Rosset**	**6**	**6**
(Haiti) R Agénor	4	1
WC	(United States) M Joyce	**6**	4	2
WC	(United States) **C Woodruff**	0	**6**	**6**
(Italy) **S Pescosolido**	5	**7^{9}**	**6**
(Brazil) F Meligeni	**7**	6^{7}	3

Second round
4	(Czech Republic) **P Korda**	**6**	**6**
(Russia) A Olhovskiy	3	4
Q	(South Africa) **M Kaplan**	**6**	**6**
(Canada) C Pridham	3	3
11	(Switzerland) **M Rosset**	**6**	3	**6**
WC	(United States) C Woodruff	4	**6**	3
(Italy) **S Pescosolido**	**6**	**7**
6	(Sweden) H Holm	2	5

Third round
4	(Czech Republic) **P Korda**	**7^{7}**	**6**
Q	(South Africa) M Kaplan	6^{2}	2
11	(Switzerland) M Rosset	1	5
(Italy) **S Pescosolido**	**6**	**7**

Quarterfinals
4	(Czech Republic) **P Korda**	**6**	**6**
(Italy) S Pescosolido	3	3

=== Bottom half ===
==== Section 3 ====
First round
(France) **O Delaître**	6^{3}	**7^{7}**	**6**
(United States) C Adams	**7^{7}**	6^{3}	1
Q	(United States) **B Farrow**	2	**7**	**6**
WC	(Sweden) M Wilander	**6**	5	4
(United States) **T Ho**	**6**	**6**
WC/12	(Germany) M-K Goellner	2	4
13	(Sweden) **J Svensson**	4	**6**	**6**
(Venezuela) N Pereira	**6**	3	4
(United States) R Weiss	6^{6}	**7^{7}**	1
(South Africa) **C van Rensburg**	**7^{8}**	6^{2}	**6**
(Australia) **T Woodbridge**	**6**	**6**
(Mexico) O Fernández	4	0

Second round
5	(Ukraine) **A Medvedev**	**7**	**6**
(France) O Delaître	5	3
Q	(United States) B Farrow	3	3
(United States) **T Ho**	**6**	**6**
13	(Sweden) **J Svensson**	**7^{7}**	**7**
(South Africa) C van Rensburg	6^{4}	5
(Australia) T Woodbridge	6^{3}	2
3	(Netherlands) **R Krajicek**	**7^{7}**	**6**

Third round
5	(Ukraine) **A Medvedev**	2	**7^{7}**	**6**
(United States) T Ho	**6**	6^{2}	0
13	(Sweden) **J Svensson**	4	**6**	**6**
3	(Netherlands) R Krajicek	**6**	3	2

Quarterfinals
5	(Ukraine) **A Medvedev**	**7^{8}**	1	**6**
13	(Sweden) J Svensson	6^{6}	**6**	4

==== Section 4 ====
First round
WC	(Russia) **Y Kafelnikov**	**6**	**6**
Q	(South Africa) L Bale	2	4
(Germany) D Prinosil	3	4
Q	(Canada) **D Nestor**	**6**	**6**
Q	(New Zealand) K Evernden	0	3
10	(United States) **A Agassi**	**6**	**6**
15	(Netherlands) J Siemerink	**6**	6^{6}	2
(Australia) **S Stolle**	3	**7^{8}**	**6**
(Australia) **N Borwick**	**7**	3	**6**
(United States) A O'Brien	5	**6**	3
(United States) K Thorne	4	2
(Germany) **J Renzenbrink**	**6**	**6**

Second round
7	(Israel) **A Mansdorf**	6^{6}	**6**	**6**
WC	(Russia) Y Kafelnikov	**7^{8}**	1	3
Q	(Canada) D Nestor	4	4
10	(United States) **A Agassi**	**6**	**6**
(Australia) **S Stolle**	**7^{7}**	2	**6**
(Australia) N Borwick	6^{4}	**6**	4
(Germany) J Renzenbrink	**7^{7}**	3	2
2	(United States) **I Lendl**	6^{2}	**6**	**6**

Third round
7	(Israel) A Mansdorf	1	4
10	(United States) **A Agassi**	**6**	**6**
(Australia) S Stolle	2	4
2	(United States) **I Lendl**	**6**	**6**

Quarterfinals
10	(United States) **A Agassi**	**6**	**6**
2	(United States) I Lendl	2	4
