= 1995 Volvo International – Doubles =

Doubles
- 1995 Volvo International
- 1994 Champions: (Canada) Grant Connell (United States) Patrick Galbraith

Final
- Champions: (United States) Rick Leach (United States) Scott Melville
- Runners-up: (India) Leander Paes (Venezuela) Nicolás Pereira
- Score: 7–6, 6–4

Details
- Draw: 28
- Seeds: 8

Events
Singles	Doubles
← 1994 ·	Volvo International	· 1996 →

Grant Connell and Patrick Galbraith were the defending champions but did not compete that year.

Rick Leach and Scott Melville won in the final 7–6, 6–4 against Leander Paes and Nicolás Pereira.

== Seeds ==
Champion seeds are indicated in bold text while text in italics indicates the round in which those seeds were eliminated. The top four seeded teams received byes into the second round.

1. (Netherlands) Jacco Eltingh / (Netherlands) Paul Haarhuis (semifinals)
2. (Russia) Yevgeny Kafelnikov / (Russia) Andrei Olhovskiy (quarterfinals)
3. (United States) Jim Grabb / (United States) Patrick McEnroe (second round)
4. (Czech Republic) Cyril Suk / (Czech Republic) Daniel Vacek (second round)
5. (United States) Trevor Kronemann / (Australia) David Macpherson (first round)
6. (South Africa) Ellis Ferreira / (United States) Jared Palmer (second round)
7. (United States) **Rick Leach** / (United States) **Scott Melville (champions)**
8. (United States) Luke Jensen / (United States) Murphy Jensen (first round)

== Draw ==
=== Key ===
- Q = Qualifier
- WC = Wild card
- LL = Lucky loser
- Alt = Alternate
- SE = Special exempt
- PR = Protected ranking
- ITF = ITF entry
- JE = Junior exempt
- w/o = Walkover
- r = Retired
- d = Defaulted
- SR = Special ranking

=== Final ===
Final
	(India) Leander Paes (Venezuela) Nicolás Pereira	6	4
7	(United States) **Rick Leach** (United States) **Scott Melville**	**7**	**6**

=== Top half ===
First round
Q	(United States) **W McGuire** (United States) **J Salzenstein**	**6**	**6**
WC	(United States) J Pugh (United States) D Rostagno	4	2
(United States) D Randall (South Africa) C van Rensburg	5	3
(Australia) **P Kilderry** (United Kingdom) **M Petchey**	**7**	**6**
(Australia) **W Arthurs** (Australia) **A Kratzmann**	**7**	**6**
8	(United States) L Jensen (United States) M Jensen	6	2
WC	(Russia) A Chesnokov (United States) L Gloria	5	6
(India) **L Paes** (Venezuela) **N Pereira**	**7**	**7**
WC	(United States) MV Washington (United States) M Washington	5	3
(Germany) **M-K Goellner** (Australia) **M Philippoussis**	**7**	**6**
(France) **A Boetsch** (France) **R Gilbert**	6	**7**	**6**
5	(United States) T Kronemann (Australia) D Macpherson	**7**	5	2

Second round
1	(Netherlands) **J Eltingh** (Netherlands) **P Haarhuis**	**6**	**6**
Q	(United States) W McGuire (United States) J Salzenstein	4	4
(Australia) P Kilderry (United Kingdom) M Petchey	4	6
(Australia) **W Arthurs** (Australia) **A Kratzmann**	**6**	**7**
3	(United States) J Grabb (United States) P McEnroe	4	2
(India) **L Paes** (Venezuela) **N Pereira**	**6**	**6**
(Germany) M-K Goellner (Australia) M Philippoussis	4	4
(France) **A Boetsch** (France) **R Gilbert**	**6**	**6**

Quarterfinals
1	(Netherlands) **J Eltingh** (Netherlands) **P Haarhuis**	4	**7**	**6**
(Australia) W Arthurs (Australia) A Kratzmann	**6**	6	4
(India) **L Paes** (Venezuela) **N Pereira**	6	**6**	**6**
(France) A Boetsch (France) R Gilbert	**7**	2	4

Semifinals
1	(Netherlands) J Eltingh (Netherlands) P Haarhuis	6	3
(India) **L Paes** (Venezuela) **N Pereira**	**7**	**6**

=== Bottom half ===
First round
6	(South Africa) **E Ferreira** (United States) **J Palmer**	**6**	**6**
(Kenya) P Wekesa (United Kingdom) C Wilkinson	2	4
(Switzerland) J Hlasek (Switzerland) M Rosset	4	**6**	6
(United Kingdom) **N Broad** (South Africa) **P Norval**	**6**	3	**7**
(United States) **M Lucena** (Australia) **J Morgan**	**7**	**6**
(United States) F Montana (United States) G Van Emburgh	5	2
7	(United States) **R Leach** (United States) **S Melville**	**7**	**6**
WC	(Germany) B Becker (United States) M De Palmer	5	4
(South Africa) **M Barnard** (United States) **S Cannon**	**6**	**6**
Q	(United States) B Barber (United States) I Williams	4	4
(Netherlands) **R Krajicek** (Netherlands) **J Siemerink**	**6**	**6**
(Zimbabwe) B Black (Zimbabwe) W Black	2	4

Second round
6	(South Africa) E Ferreira (United States) J Palmer	6	3
(United Kingdom) **N Broad** (South Africa) **P Norval**	**7**	**6**
(United States) **M Lucena** (Australia) **J Morgan**	**6**	**7**
4	(Czech Republic) C Suk (Czech Republic) D Vacek	3	6
7	(United States) **R Leach** (United States) **S Melville**	**7**	**6**
(South Africa) M Barnard (United States) S Cannon	6	4
(Netherlands) R Krajicek (Netherlands) J Siemerink	**6**	4	1
2	(Russia) **Y Kafelnikov** (Russia) **A Olhovskiy**	3	**6**	**6**

Quarterfinals
(United Kingdom) N Broad (South Africa) P Norval	3	**7**	4
(United States) **M Lucena** (Australia) **J Morgan**	**6**	5	**6**
7	(United States) **R Leach** (United States) **S Melville**	5	**6**	**6**
2	(Russia) Y Kafelnikov (Russia) A Olhovskiy	**7**	2	3

Semifinals
(United States) M Lucena (Australia) J Morgan	6	0
7	(United States) **R Leach** (United States) **S Melville**	**7**	**6**
