= 1991 Volvo International – Singles =

Singles
- 1991 Volvo International

Final
- Champion: (Czechoslovakia) Petr Korda
- Runner-up: (Croatia) Goran Ivanišević
- Score: 6–4, 6–2

Details
- Draw: 56
- Seeds: 16

Events
Singles	Doubles
← 1990 ·	Volvo International	· 1992 →

Derrick Rostagno was the defending champion but lost in the semifinals to Goran Ivanišević.

Petr Korda won in the final 6–4, 6–2 against Ivanišević.

== Seeds ==
A champion seed is indicated in bold text while text in italics indicates the round in which that seed was eliminated. The top eight seeds received a bye to the second round.

1. (Sweden) Stefan Edberg (third round)
2. (Czechoslovakia) Ivan Lendl (third round)
3. (United States) Brad Gilbert (second round)
4. (United States) John McEnroe (quarterfinals)
5. (Croatia) Goran Ivanišević (final)
6. (United States) Richey Reneberg (third round)
7. (Sweden) Jonas Svensson (third round)
8. (Soviet Union) Andrei Chesnokov (second round)
9. (United States) Derrick Rostagno (semifinals)
10. (United States) Michael Chang (quarterfinals)
11. (Czechoslovakia) **Petr Korda (champion)**
12. n/a
13. (Italy) Omar Camporese (quarterfinals)
14. (Australia) Todd Woodbridge (first round)
15. (Netherlands) Richard Krajicek (quarterfinals)
16. (Switzerland) Marc Rosset (semifinals)

== Draw ==
=== Key ===
- Q = Qualifier
- WC = Wild card
- LL = Lucky loser
- Alt = Alternate
- SE = Special exempt
- PR = Protected ranking
- ITF = ITF entry
- JE = Junior exempt
- w/o = Walkover
- r = Retired
- d = Defaulted
- SR = Special ranking

=== Finals ===
Semifinals
9	(United States) Derrick Rostagno	4	5
WC/5	(Croatia) **Goran Ivanišević**	**6**	**7**
11	(Czechoslovakia) **Petr Korda**	**6**	**6**
16	(Switzerland) Marc Rosset	4	3

Final
WC/5	(Croatia) Goran Ivanišević	4	2
11	(Czechoslovakia) **Petr Korda**	**6**	**6**

=== Top half ===
==== Section 1 ====
First round
(United States) **M Washington**	**6**	**6**
WC	(United States) J Connors	4	2
(Peru) P Arraya	**7^{7}**	1	0^{r}
(Israel) **G Bloom**	6^{5}	**6**	4
(South Africa) C van Rensburg	**6**	3	4
15	(Netherlands) **R Krajicek**	3	**6**	**6**
9	(United States) **D Rostagno**	**6**	**6**
(United States) B Garrow	3	4
(United States) J Kriek	5	2
Q	(United States) **A O'Brien**	**7**	**6**
Q	(United States) T Ho	3	0
(Netherlands) **P Haarhuis**	**6**	**6**

Second round
WC/1	(Sweden) **S Edberg**	**6**	**6**
(United States) M Washington	4	4
(Israel) G Bloom	5	3
15	(Netherlands) **R Krajicek**	**7**	**6**
9	(United States) **D Rostagno**	**7^{7}**	**6**
Q	(United States) A O'Brien	6^{5}	2
(Netherlands) **P Haarhuis**	**7^{7}**	3	**7**
WC/8	(Soviet Union) A Chesnokov	6^{5}	**6**	5

Third round
WC/1	(Sweden) S Edberg	**6**	3	3
15	(Netherlands) **R Krajicek**	4	**6**	**6**
9	(United States) **D Rostagno**	**6**	**7**
(Netherlands) P Haarhuis	3	5

Quarterfinals
15	(Netherlands) R Krajicek	**6**	1^{r}
9	(United States) **D Rostagno**	3	2

==== Section 2 ====
First round
(Brazil) **L Mattar**	**6**	**6**
(Ecuador) A Gómez	2	3
(Brazil) **F Roese**	**6**	**6**
(United States) J Arias	4	4
(United States) **B Shelton**	**7^{7}**	**6**
14	(Australia) T Woodbridge	6^{2}	3
LL	(United Kingdom) A Castle	1	4
(Netherlands) **J Siemerink**	**6**	**6**
Q	(United States) T Nelson	5	**6**	2
(Czechoslovakia) **C Doseděl**	**7**	2	**6**
LL	(Italy) **G Pozzi**	**6**	1
(Sweden) T Högstedt	0	0^{r}

Second round
4	(United States) **J McEnroe**	4	**6**	**6**
(Brazil) L Mattar	**6**	3	4
(Brazil) **F Roese**	**7**	2	**6**
(United States) B Shelton	5	**6**	4
(Netherlands) **J Siemerink**	**6**	**6**
(Czechoslovakia) C Doseděl	3	1
LL	(Italy) G Pozzi	6^{7}	**6**	2
WC/5	(Croatia) **G Ivanišević**	**7^{9}**	4	**6**

Third round
4	(United States) **J McEnroe**	**6**	**6**
(Brazil) F Roese	0	3
(Netherlands) J Siemerink	2	4
WC/5	(Croatia) **G Ivanišević**	**6**	**6**

Quarterfinals
4	(United States) J McEnroe	4	2
WC/5	(Croatia) **G Ivanišević**	**6**	**6**

=== Bottom half ===
==== Section 3 ====
First round
(United States) C Adams	**6**	6^{5}	3
Q	(United States) **P Annacone**	3	**7^{7}**	**6**
(Argentina) **J Frana**	**6**	**6**
(Czechoslovakia) M Vajda	3	2
(France) J-P Fleurian	3	3
11	(Czechoslovakia) **P Korda**	**6**	**6**
13	(Italy) **O Camporese**	4	**6**	**6**
(Australia) W Masur	**6**	4	4
(Brazil) J Oncins	3	2
(Mexico) **L Herrera**	**6**	**6**
(Brazil) **D Marcelino**	**6**	**7**
Q	(India) L Paes	4	5

Second round
6	(United States) **R Reneberg**	w/o
Q	(United States) P Annacone
(Argentina) J Frana	6^{0}	3
11	(Czechoslovakia) **P Korda**	**7^{7}**	**6**
13	(Italy) **O Camporese**	**6**	**7^{7}**
(Mexico) L Herrera	4	6^{2}
(Brazil) **D Marcelino**	**6**	4	**6**
3	(United States) B Gilbert	4	**6**	4

Third round
6	(United States) R Reneberg	3	6^{5}
11	(Czechoslovakia) **P Korda**	**6**	**7^{7}**
13	(Italy) **O Camporese**	**6**	**6**
(Brazil) D Marcelino	2	2

Quarterfinals
11	(Czechoslovakia) **P Korda**	**6**	**6**
13	(Italy) O Camporese	4	1

==== Section 4 ====
First round
(United States) D Goldie	**6**	3	6^{5}
Q	(South Africa) **M Kaplan**	3	**6**	**7^{7}**
(Israel) **A Mansdorf**	**6**	**6**
Q	(United Kingdom) M Petchey	4	2
(Sweden) M Pernfors	3	**7**	2
WC/10	(United States) **M Chang**	**6**	5	**6**
16	(Switzerland) **M Rosset**	**6**	**6**
(Australia) M Woodforde	4	2
(United States) C Garner	4	6^{2}
(France) **O Delaître**	**6**	**7^{7}**
(United States) J Grabb	1	**6**	4
(France) **A Boetsch**	**6**	4	**6**

Second round
7	(Sweden) **J Svensson**	**6**	**6**
Q	(South Africa) M Kaplan	4	3
(Israel) A Mansdorf	5	2
WC/10	(United States) **M Chang**	**7**	**6**
16	(Switzerland) **M Rosset**	**6**	**6**
(France) O Delaître	3	1
(France) A Boetsch	2	2
2	(Czechoslovakia) **I Lendl**	**6**	**6**

Third round
7	(Sweden) J Svensson	3	**6**	3
WC/10	(United States) **M Chang**	**6**	3	**6**
16	(Switzerland) **M Rosset**	**6**	**6**
2	(Czechoslovakia) I Lendl	4	4

Quarterfinals
WC/10	(United States) M Chang	2	3
16	(Switzerland) **M Rosset**	**6**	**6**
