= 1993 Volvo International – Doubles =

Doubles
- 1993 Volvo International
- 1992 Champions: (United States) Kelly Jones (United States) Rick Leach

Final
- Champions: (Czech Republic) Cyril Suk (Czech Republic) Daniel Vacek
- Runners-up: (United States) Steve DeVries (Australia) David Macpherson
- Score: 7–5, 6–4

Details
- Draw: 28
- Seeds: 8

Events
Singles	Doubles
← 1992 ·	Volvo International	· 1994 →

The 1993 Volvo International was a tennis tournament played on outdoor hard courts at the Cullman-Heyman Tennis Center in New Haven, Connecticut, United States and was part of the Championship Series of the 1993 ATP Tour. The tournament ran from August 16 through August 23, 1993. Kelly Jones and Rick Leach were the defending champions but only Jones competed that year with Paul Annacone. Annacone and Jones lost in the semifinals to Cyril Suk and Daniel Vacek. Suk and Vacek won in the final 7–5, 6–4 against Steve DeVries and David Macpherson.

== Seeds ==
Champion seeds are indicated in bold text while text in italics indicates the round in which those seeds were eliminated. The top four seeded teams received byes into the second round.

1. (Australia) Todd Woodbridge / (Australia) Mark Woodforde (second round)
2. (United States) Luke Jensen / (United States) Murphy Jensen (quarterfinals)
3. (United States) Steve DeVries / (Australia) David Macpherson (final)
4. (United States) Shelby Cannon / (United States) Scott Melville (second round)
5. (South Africa) David Adams / (Russia) Andrei Olhovskiy (quarterfinals)
6. (Sweden) Stefan Edberg / (Czech Republic) Petr Korda (quarterfinals)
7. (Zimbabwe) Byron Black / (South Africa) Christo van Rensburg (first round)
8. (South Africa) Stefan Kruger / (United States) Greg Van Emburgh (second round)

== Draw ==
=== Key ===
- Q = Qualifier
- WC = Wild card
- LL = Lucky loser
- Alt = Alternate
- SE = Special exempt
- PR = Protected ranking
- ITF = ITF entry
- JE = Junior exempt
- w/o = Walkover
- r = Retired
- d = Defaulted
- SR = Special ranking

=== Final ===
Final
3	(United States) Steve DeVries (Australia) David Macpherson	5	4
	(Czech Republic) **Cyril Suk** (Czech Republic) **Daniel Vacek**	**7**	**6**

=== Top half ===
First round
(South Africa) M Barnard (United States) T Mercer	4	3
(Sweden) **H Holm** (Norway) **B-O Pedersen**	**6**	**6**
Q	(Canada) **S Lareau** (Canada) **D Nestor**	**6**	**6**
WC	(Sweden) R Båthman (Sweden) M Wilander	3	2
(Argentina) **P Albano** (Mexico) **J Lozano**	**7**	0	**6**
7	(Zimbabwe) B Black (South Africa) C van Rensburg	6	**6**	4
(Germany) M-K Goellner (Switzerland) M Rosset	3	2
WC	(United States) **T Ho** (United States) **C Woodruff**	**6**	**6**
(Italy) **D Nargiso** (Italy) **L Tieleman**	**7**	0	**6**
(Czech Republic) M Damm (Sweden) P Nyborg	6	**6**	4
(United States) B Devening (United States) A O'Brien	**6**	2	3
6	(Sweden) **S Edberg** (Czech Republic) **P Korda**	3	**6**	**6**

Second round
1	(Australia) T Woodbridge (Australia) M Woodforde	3	4
(Sweden) **H Holm** (Norway) **B-O Pedersen**	**6**	**6**
Q	(Canada) **S Lareau** (Canada) **D Nestor**	**6**	**6**
(Argentina) P Albano (Mexico) J Lozano	3	2
3	(United States) **S DeVries** (Australia) **D Macpherson**	3	**7**	**7**
WC	(United States) T Ho (United States) C Woodruff	**6**	6	6
(Italy) D Nargiso (Italy) L Tieleman	4	4
6	(Sweden) **S Edberg** (Czech Republic) **P Korda**	6	6

Quarterfinals
(Sweden) H Holm (Norway) B-O Pedersen	3	2
Q	(Canada) **S Lareau** (Canada) **D Nestor**	**6**	**6**
3	(United States) **S DeVries** (Australia) **D Macpherson**	6	**6**	**7**
6	(Sweden) S Edberg (Czech Republic) P Korda	**7**	2	6

Semifinals
Q	(Canada) S Lareau (Canada) D Nestor	6	4
3	(United States) **S DeVries** (Australia) **D Macpherson**	**7**	**6**

=== Bottom half ===
First round
5	(South Africa) **D Adams** (Russia) **A Olhovskiy**	**6**	**7**
(Sweden) J Donar (Sweden) T Svantesson	2	6
(Netherlands) R Krajicek (Netherlands) J Siemerink	4	**7**	3
(France) **A Boetsch** (France) **O Delaître**	**6**	5	**6**
(Czech Republic) **C Suk** (Czech Republic) **D Vacek**	1	**6**	**6**
(Netherlands) S Groen (Venezuela) N Pereira	**6**	4	3
8	(South Africa) **S Kruger** (United States) **G Van Emburgh**	**7**	6	**7**
(Germany) D Prinosil (Germany) C-U Steeb	6	**7**	6
Q	(South Africa) E Ferreira (South Africa) G Stafford	4	4
(United States) **P Annacone** (United States) **K Jones**	**6**	**6**
(United Kingdom) **J Bates** (Australia) **S Stolle**	2	**6**	**6**
WC	(United States) M Joyce (United States) M Lucena	**6**	3	2

Second round
5	(South Africa) **D Adams** (Russia) **A Olhovskiy**	**6**	6	**6**
(France) A Boetsch (France) O Delaître	3	**7**	3
(Czech Republic) **C Suk** (Czech Republic) **D Vacek**	**6**	**6**
4	(United States) S Cannon (United States) S Melville	3	2
8	(South Africa) S Kruger (United States) G Van Emburgh	**6**	6	6
(United States) **P Annacone** (United States) **K Jones**	3	**7**	**7**
(United Kingdom) J Bates (Australia) S Stolle	4	4
2	(United States) **L Jensen** (United States) **M Jensen**	**6**	**6**

Quarterfinals
5	(South Africa) D Adams (Russia) A Olhovskiy	6	**6**	3
(Czech Republic) **C Suk** (Czech Republic) **D Vacek**	**7**	4	**6**
(United States) **P Annacone** (United States) **K Jones**	**6**	**6**
2	(United States) L Jensen (United States) M Jensen	3	2

Semifinals
(Czech Republic) **C Suk** (Czech Republic) **D Vacek**	**7**	**7**
(United States) P Annacone (United States) K Jones	6	6
