= 1995 Volvo International – Singles =

Singles
- 1995 Volvo International

Final
- Champion: (United States) Andre Agassi
- Runner-up: (Netherlands) Richard Krajicek
- Score: 3–6, 7–6^{(7–2)}, 6–3

Details
- Draw: 56
- Seeds: 16

Events
Singles	Doubles
← 1994 ·	Volvo International	· 1996 →

Boris Becker was the defending champion but lost in the quarterfinals to Richard Krajicek.

Andre Agassi won in the final 3–6, 7–6^{(7–2)}, 6–3 against Krajicek.

== Seeds ==
A champion seed is indicated in bold text while text in italics indicates the round in which that seed was eliminated. The top eight seeds received a bye to the second round.

1. (United States) **Andre Agassi (champion)**
2. (Germany) Boris Becker (quarterfinals)
3. (United States) Michael Chang (second round)
4. (Russia) Yevgeny Kafelnikov (semifinals)
5. (Germany) Michael Stich (second round)
6. (Switzerland) Marc Rosset (quarterfinals)
7. (Spain) Sergi Bruguera (quarterfinals)
8. (Netherlands) Richard Krajicek (final)
9. (Netherlands) Jacco Eltingh (first round)
10. (Netherlands) Paul Haarhuis (third round)
11. (France) Arnaud Boetsch (third round)
12. (United States) MaliVai Washington (second round)
13. (Netherlands) Jan Siemerink (second round)
14. (Chile) Marcelo Ríos (third round)
15. (Australia) Patrick Rafter (third round)
16. (United States) Patrick McEnroe (third round)

== Draw ==
=== Key ===
- Q = Qualifier
- WC = Wild card
- LL = Lucky loser
- Alt = Alternate
- SE = Special exempt
- PR = Protected ranking
- ITF = ITF entry
- JE = Junior exempt
- w/o = Walkover
- r = Retired
- d = Defaulted
- SR = Special ranking

=== Finals ===
Semifinals
1	(United States) **Andre Agassi**	**6**	**6**
(Sweden) Mats Wilander	3	3
4	(Russia) Yevgeny Kafelnikov	4	4
8	(Netherlands) **Richard Krajicek**	**6**	**6**

Final
1	(United States) **Andre Agassi**	3	**7^{7}**	**6**
8	(Netherlands) Richard Krajicek	**6**	6^{2}	3

=== Top half ===
==== Section 1 ====
First round
(Brazil) **F Meligeni**	1	**6**	**7^{9}**
WC	(United States) L Jensen	**6**	3	6^{7}
WC	(United States) **S Campbell**	**6**	**6**
(United Kingdom) M Petchey	4	1
(Australia) M Philippoussis	4	5
15	(Australia) **P Rafter**	**6**	**7**
9	(Netherlands) J Eltingh	3	3
Q	(Zimbabwe) **W Black**	**6**	**6**
(United States) J Palmer	5	**6**	3
(United Kingdom) **C Wilkinson**	**7**	3	**6**
Q	(South Africa) P Norval	3	4
(Czech Republic) **D Vacek**	**6**	**6**

Second round
1	(United States) **A Agassi**	**6**	**7**
(Brazil) F Meligeni	4	5
WC	(United States) S Campbell	4	2
15	(Australia) **P Rafter**	**6**	**6**
Q	(Zimbabwe) **W Black**	**6**	4	**6**
(United Kingdom) C Wilkinson	4	**6**	3
(Czech Republic) D Vacek	3	**6**	6^{2}
7	(Spain) **S Bruguera**	**6**	4	**7^{7}**

Third round
1	(United States) **A Agassi**	**6**	**6**
15	(Australia) P Rafter	2	4
Q	(Zimbabwe) W Black	**6**	3	5
7	(Spain) **S Bruguera**	2	**6**	**7**

Quarterfinals
1	(United States) **A Agassi**	**6**	**6**
7	(Spain) S Bruguera	4	1

==== Section 2 ====
First round
(Denmark) **K Carlsen**	**6**	3	**7^{7}**
(Italy) G Pozzi	4	**6**	6^{2}
(Sweden) **M Wilander**	**6**	**6**
Q	(United States) J Pugh	0	2
(Japan) S Matsuoka	4	4
13	(Netherlands) **J Siemerink**	**6**	**6**
12	(United States) **M Washington**	**6**	**6**
(Russia) A Chesnokov	3	1
(Venezuela) **N Pereira**	**6**	**6**
(Romania) A Voinea	4	1
Q	(United States) R Givone	**6**	1	3
Q	(South Africa) **E Ferreira**	4	**6**	**6**

Second round
3	(United States) M Chang	5	4
(Denmark) **K Carlsen**	**7**	**6**
(Sweden) **M Wilander**	**6**	**6**
13	(Netherlands) J Siemerink	4	4
12	(United States) M Washington	3	2
(Venezuela) **N Pereira**	**6**	**6**
Q	(South Africa) E Ferreira	6^{0}	3
6	(Switzerland) **M Rosset**	**7^{7}**	**6**

Third round
(Denmark) K Carlsen	**7^{8}**	3	6^{2}
(Sweden) **M Wilander**	6^{6}	**6**	**7^{7}**
(Venezuela) N Pereira	4	3
6	(Switzerland) **M Rosset**	**6**	**6**

Quarterfinals
(Sweden) **M Wilander**	6^{8}	**7**	**7**
6	(Switzerland) M Rosset	**7^{10}**	5	5

=== Bottom half ===
==== Section 3 ====
First round
WC	(United States) S Humphries	6^{4}	**6**	5
Q	(Canada) **A Chang**	**7^{7}**	3	**7**
(Switzerland) **J Hlasek**	**6**	**6**
(Argentina) M Charpentier	1	4
(Italy) S Pescosolido	3	2
11	(France) **A Boetsch**	**6**	**6**
14	(Chile) **M Ríos**	1	**6**	**6**
(India) L Paes	**6**	1	4
WC	(United States) L Gloria	4	**6**	4
(Italy) **D Musa**	**6**	4	**6**
(Germany) **M-K Goellner**	**6**	**6**
(France) T Guardiola	4	3

Second round
5	(Germany) M Stich	**6**	3	r
Q	(Canada) **A Chang**	4	**6**
(Switzerland) J Hlasek	2	4
11	(France) **A Boetsch**	**6**	**6**
14	(Chile) **M Ríos**	**6**	**6**
(Italy) D Musa	2	4
(Germany) M-K Goellner	1	3
4	(Russia) **Y Kafelnikov**	**6**	**6**

Third round
Q	(Canada) **A Chang**	**7**	**6**
11	(France) A Boetsch	5	2
14	(Chile) M Ríos	3	6^{2}
4	(Russia) **Y Kafelnikov**	**6**	**7^{7}**

Quarterfinals
Q	(Canada) A Chang	3	2
4	(Russia) **Y Kafelnikov**	**6**	**6**

==== Section 4 ====
First round
(United States) M Joyce	**7**	4	4
WC	(United States) **D Rostagno**	5	**6**	**6**
(Zimbabwe) **B Black**	**6**	**6**
(United States) J Grabb	1	2
(Russia) A Olhovskiy	6^{3}	3
10	(Netherlands) **P Haarhuis**	**7^{7}**	**6**
16	(United States) **P McEnroe**	**6**	**6**
(Colombia) M Hadad	1	2
(Kenya) **P Wekesa**	**6**	6^{5}	**6**
(Slovakia) J Krošlák	1	**7^{7}**	2
Q	(United States) J Salzenstein	4	3
(France) **R Gilbert**	**6**	**6**

Second round
8	(Netherlands) **R Krajicek**	**6**	**6**
WC	(United States) D Rostagno	2	2
(Zimbabwe) B Black	4	**6**	3
10	(Netherlands) **P Haarhuis**	**6**	3	**6**
16	(United States) **P McEnroe**	**6**	**6**
(Kenya) P Wekesa	1	3
(France) R Gilbert	4	4
2	(Germany) **B Becker**	**6**	**6**

Third round
8	(Netherlands) **R Krajicek**	4	**6**	**7**
10	(Netherlands) P Haarhuis	**6**	4	5
16	(United States) P McEnroe	**6**	6^{2}	4
2	(Germany) **B Becker**	3	**7^{7}**	**6**

Quarterfinals
8	(Netherlands) **R Krajicek**	**7^{7}**	3	**7^{7}**
2	(Germany) B Becker	6^{5}	**6**	6^{5}
