= 1994 Volvo International – Singles =

Tennis tournament event

Singles
- 1994 Volvo International

Final
- Champion: (Germany) Boris Becker
- Runner-up: (Switzerland) Marc Rosset
- Score: 6–3, 7–5

Details
- Draw: 56
- Seeds: 16

Events
Singles	Doubles
← 1993 ·	Volvo International	· 1995 →

Andriy Medvedev was the defending champion but lost in the quarterfinals to Marc Rosset.

Boris Becker won in the final 6–3, 7–5 against Rosset.

== Seeds ==
A champion seed is indicated in bold text while text in italics indicates the round in which that seed was eliminated. The top eight seeds received a bye to the second round.

1. (Germany) Michael Stich (semifinals)
2. (Ukraine) Andriy Medvedev (quarterfinals)
3. (Germany) **Boris Becker (champion)**
4. (United States) Andre Agassi (second round)
5. (Czech Republic) Petr Korda (third round)
6. (Russia) Yevgeny Kafelnikov (semifinals)
7. (Switzerland) Marc Rosset (final)
8. (Australia) Patrick Rafter (quarterfinals)
9. (Netherlands) Paul Haarhuis (first round)
10. (United States) Ivan Lendl (third round)
11. (United States) MaliVai Washington (quarterfinals)
12. (United States) Brad Gilbert (first round)
13. (Russia) Andrei Chesnokov (third round)
14. (Australia) Richard Fromberg (first round)
15. (Czech Republic) Daniel Vacek (third round)
16. (Italy) Stefano Pescosolido (third round)

== Draw ==
=== Key ===
- Q = Qualifier
- WC = Wild card
- LL = Lucky loser
- Alt = Alternate
- ITF = ITF entry
- PR = Protected ranking
- SR = Special ranking
- SE = Special exempt
- JE = Junior exempt
- JR = Junior Accelerator Programme entrant
- CO = College Accelerator Programme entrant
- NG = Next Gen Accelerator Program entrant
- w/o = Walkover
- r = Retired
- d = Defaulted

=== Finals ===
Semifinals
1	(Germany) Michael Stich	2	5
3	(Germany) **Boris Becker**	**6**	**7**
6	(Russia) Yevgeny Kafelnikov	6^{5}	3
7	(Switzerland) **Marc Rosset**	**7^{7}**	**6**

Final
3	(Germany) **Boris Becker**	**6**	**7**
7	(Switzerland) Marc Rosset	3	5

=== Top half ===
==== Section 1 ====
First round
WC	(Chile) **M Ríos**	**6**	3	**6**
Q	(South Africa) D Nainkin	4	**6**	1
(United States) J Tarango	2	2
(France) **R Gilbert**	**6**	**6**
(Denmark) K Carlsen	**6**	6^{4}	6^{5}
15	(Czech Republic) **D Vacek**	2	**7^{7}**	**7^{7}**
9	(Netherlands) P Haarhuis	3	2
WC	(United States) **V Spadea**	**6**	**6**
Q	(South Africa) **D Adams**	**6**	**6**
(Sweden) L Jönsson	4	3
(United States) **A O'Brien**	3	**6**	**7^{8}**
WC	(France) G Forget	**6**	3	6^{6}

Second round
1	(Germany) **M Stich**	**6**	**7**
WC	(Chile) M Ríos	3	5
(France) R Gilbert	**7^{10}**	4	6^{7}
15	(Czech Republic) **D Vacek**	6^{8}	**6**	**7^{9}**
WC	(United States) **V Spadea**	**6**	**6**
Q	(South Africa) D Adams	3	3
(United States) A O'Brien	4	3
8	(Australia) **P Rafter**	**6**	**6**

Third round
1	(Germany) **M Stich**	**6**	**6**
15	(Czech Republic) D Vacek	2	2
WC	(United States) V Spadea	6^{2}	4
8	(Australia) **P Rafter**	**7^{7}**	**6**

Quarterfinals
1	(Germany) **M Stich**	**6**	5	**6**
8	(Australia) P Rafter	2	**7**	1

==== Section 2 ====
First round
(Venezuela) M Ruah	6^{3}	4
Q	(The Bahamas) **R Smith**	**7^{7}**	**6**
(Argentina) P Arnold	**6**	3	4
(Spain) **J Burillo**	1	**6**	**6**
(Zimbabwe) B Black	4	0
13	(Russia) **A Chesnokov**	**6**	**6**
11	(United States) **M Washington**	**6**	5	**6**
(Japan) S Matsuoka	3	**7**	2
Q	(Australia) **M Philippoussis**	4	**6**	**6**
(United Kingdom) M Petchey	**6**	3	2
(Netherlands) J Eltingh	6^{2}	**6**	1
(United States) **C Adams**	**7^{7}**	4	**6**

Second round
3	(Germany) **B Becker**	**6**	**6**
Q	(The Bahamas) R Smith	3	4
(Spain) J Burillo	5	**6**	1
13	(Russia) **A Chesnokov**	**7**	3	**6**
11	(United States) **M Washington**	**7**	**6**
Q	(Australia) M Philippoussis	5	2
(United States) C Adams	**6**	5	5
5	(Czech Republic) **P Korda**	3	**7**	**7**

Third round
3	(Germany) **B Becker**	**6**	**6**
13	(Russia) A Chesnokov	3	4
11	(United States) **M Washington**	**6**	**6**
5	(Czech Republic) P Korda	3	3

Quarterfinals
3	(Germany) **B Becker**	**6**	**6**
11	(United States) M Washington	2	4

=== Bottom half ===
==== Section 3 ====
First round
(Czech Republic) M Damm	6^{4}	5
(United States) **R Weiss**	**7^{7}**	**7**
LL	(Australia) M Tebbutt	2	**6**	3
(Russia) **A Olhovskiy**	**6**	4	**6**
Q	(Zimbabwe) **W Black**	**6**	**6**
12	(United States) B Gilbert	3	0
14	(Australia) R Fromberg	6^{4}	2
(Germany) **M-K Goellner**	**7^{7}**	**6**
(South Africa) C van Rensburg	**7**	3	0
(France) **L Roux**	5	**6**	**6**
(Netherlands) **J Siemerink**	**6**	**7^{7}**
(Italy) C Caratti	3	6^{4}

Second round
6	(Russia) **Y Kafelnikov**	**7^{7}**	**6**
(United States) R Weiss	6^{1}	1
(Russia) A Olhovskiy	**6**	3	5
Q	(Zimbabwe) **W Black**	4	**6**	**7**
(Germany) **M-K Goellner**	**6**	3	**6**
(France) L Roux	4	**6**	3
(Netherlands) **J Siemerink**	**6**	3	**6**
4	(United States) A Agassi	3	**6**	3

Third round
6	(Russia) **Y Kafelnikov**	**6**	4	**6**
Q	(Zimbabwe) W Black	4	**6**	4
(Germany) **M-K Goellner**	3	**7^{7}**	**6**
(Netherlands) J Siemerink	**6**	6^{5}	4

Quarterfinals
6	(Russia) **Y Kafelnikov**	**7^{7}**	5	**6**
(Germany) M-K Goellner	6^{2}	**7**	4

==== Section 4 ====
First round
(United States) J Palmer	6^{5}	5
(Sweden) **J Apell**	**7^{7}**	**7**
WC	(United States) L Jensen	2	4
(Sweden) **J Björkman**	**6**	**6**
(Czech Republic) D Rikl	4	2
10	(United States) **I Lendl**	**6**	**6**
16	(Italy) **S Pescosolido**	**6**	**6**
WC	(United Kingdom) T Henman	3	2
(United States) **P McEnroe**	**6**	**7**
Q	(Canada) S Lareau	3	5
(South Africa) **G Stafford**	**7^{11}**	**6**
Q	(Peru) JL Noriega	6^{9}	2

Second round
7	(Switzerland) **M Rosset**	**6**	**6**
(Sweden) J Apell	4	2
(Sweden) J Björkman	4	6^{3}
10	(United States) **I Lendl**	**6**	**7^{7}**
16	(Italy) **S Pescosolido**	0	**7^{8}**	**7^{9}**
(United States) P McEnroe	**6**	6^{6}	6^{7}
(South Africa) G Stafford	1	3
2	(Ukraine) **A Medvedev**	**6**	**6**

Third round
7	(Switzerland) **M Rosset**	6^{6}	**6**	**6**
10	(United States) I Lendl	**7^{8}**	3	4
16	(Italy) S Pescosolido	2	6^{3}
2	(Ukraine) **A Medvedev**	**6**	**7^{7}**

Quarterfinals
7	(Switzerland) **M Rosset**	**6**	3	**7^{8}**
2	(Ukraine) A Medvedev	3	**6**	6^{6}
