= Jerry Simmons =

Jerry Simmons may refer to:

- Jerry Simmons (tennis), former head men's tennis coach at Louisiana State University
- Jerry Simmons (wide receiver) (1942–2024), American football wide receiver
- Jerry Simmons (American football coach) (born 1954), former American football strength and conditioning coach
