= 1991 Volvo International =

- Date: August 12–19
- Edition: 19th
- Category: Championship Series
- Draw: 64S / 32D
- Prize money: $825,000
- Surface: Hard / outdoor
- Location: New Haven, Connecticut, U.S.
- Venue: Cullman-Heyman Tennis Center

Champions

Singles
- (Czechoslovakia) Petr Korda

Doubles
- (Czechoslovakia) Petr Korda / (Australia) Wally Masur
- Volvo International

The 1991 Volvo International was a men's tennis tournament played on outdoor hard courts at the Cullman-Heyman Tennis Center in New Haven, Connecticut in the United States and was part of the Championship Series of the 1991 ATP Tour. It was the 19th edition of the tournament and ran from August 12 through August 19, 1991. Petr Korda, who was seeded 11th, won the singles title.

== Finals ==
=== Singles ===
(Czechoslovakia) Petr Korda defeated (Croatia) Goran Ivanišević 6–4, 6–2

- It was Korda's first singles title of his career.

=== Doubles ===
(Czechoslovakia) Petr Korda / (Australia) Wally Masur defeated (United States) Jeff Brown / (United States) Scott Melville 7–5, 6–3

- It was Korda's 2nd title of the year and the 6th of his career. It was Masur's 3rd title of the year and the 17th of his career.
