= 1990 Volvo International – Singles =

Singles
- 1990 Volvo International

Final
- Champion: (United States) Derrick Rostagno
- Runner-up: (Australia) Todd Woodbridge
- Score: 6–3, 6–3

Details
- Draw: 56
- Seeds: 16

Events
Singles	Doubles
← 1989 ·	Volvo International	· 1991 →

Brad Gilbert was the defending champion but lost in the second round to Cristiano Caratti.

Derrick Rostagno won in the final 6–3, 6–3 against Todd Woodbridge.

== Seeds ==
A champion seed is indicated in bold text while text in italics indicates the round in which that seed was eliminated. The top eight seeds received a bye to the second round.

1. (Czechoslovakia) Ivan Lendl (second round)
2. (Ecuador) Andrés Gómez (third round)
3. (United States) Brad Gilbert (second round)
4. (United States) Michael Chang (second round)
5. (Soviet Union) Andrei Chesnokov (semifinals)
6. (Socialist Federal Republic of Yugoslavia) Goran Ivanišević (second round)
7. (Sweden) Jonas Svensson (third round)
8. (United States) Tim Mayotte (second round)
9. (Australia) Richard Fromberg (second round)
10. (Czechoslovakia) Petr Korda (first round)
11. (Australia) Wally Masur (quarterfinals)
12. (United States) Jim Grabb (third round)
13. (Israel) Amos Mansdorf (third round)
14. (Sweden) Mats Wilander (first round)
15. (United States) David Wheaton (second round)
16. (South Africa) Christo van Rensburg (third round)

== Draw ==
=== Key ===
- Q = Qualifier
- WC = Wild card
- LL = Lucky loser
- Alt = Alternate
- SE = Special exempt
- PR = Protected ranking
- ITF = ITF entry
- JE = Junior exempt
- w/o = Walkover
- r = Retired
- d = Defaulted
- SR = Special ranking

=== Finals ===
Semifinals
WC	(Australia) Mark Woodforde	**6**	4	3
(Australia) **Todd Woodbridge**	1	**6**	**6**
5	(Soviet Union) Andrei Chesnokov	6^{4}	3
(United States) **Derrick Rostagno**	**7^{7}**	**6**

Final
(Australia) Todd Woodbridge	3	3
(United States) **Derrick Rostagno**	**6**	**6**

=== Top half ===
==== Section 1 ====
First round
(United States) P McEnroe	3	5
(United States) **M Washington**	**6**	**7**
(United States) **B Shelton**	**6**	**7**
(Italy) C Pistolesi	3	6
(Czechoslovakia) M Šrejber	1	2
15	(United States) **D Wheaton**	**6**	**6**
9	(Australia) **R Fromberg**	**6**	**6**
(Australia) N Borwick	3	0
WC	(Australia) J Fitzgerald	4	2
WC	(Australia) **M Woodforde**	**6**	**6**
WC	(United States) E Teltscher	4	**6**	6
WC	(United States) **T Ho**	**6**	4	**7**

Second round
1	(Czechoslovakia) I Lendl	2	3
(United States) **M Washington**	**6**	**6**
(United States) **B Shelton**	**6**	**6**
15	(United States) D Wheaton	2	4
9	(Australia) R Fromberg	1	**6**	4
WC	(Australia) **M Woodforde**	**6**	2	**6**
WC	(United States) T Ho	**6**	4	6
7	(Sweden) **J Svensson**	4	**6**	**7**

Third round
(United States) M Washington	4	**6**	6
(United States) **B Shelton**	**6**	3	**7**
WC	(Australia) **M Woodforde**	**6**	3	**6**
7	(Sweden) J Svensson	3	**6**	4

Quarterfinals
(United States) B Shelton	5	2
WC	(Australia) **M Woodforde**	**7**	**6**

==== Section 2 ====
First round
(Australia) **T Woodbridge**	**6**	**6**
(Sweden) T Högstedt	1	0
Q	(United States) P Johnson	5	0
(United States) **B Pearce**	**7**	**6**
(Australia) **P Cash**	1	**7**	**6**
14	(Sweden) M Wilander	**6**	5	3
11	(Australia) **W Masur**	1	**6**	**6**
(Netherlands) M Schapers	**6**	3	4
(United States) **D Goldie**	**7**	4	**6**
(United States) G Layendecker	6	**6**	3
(France) T Benhabiles	3	**6**	2
(United States) **P Chamberlin**	**6**	3	**6**

Second round
4	(United States) M Chang	3	**6**	3
(Australia) **T Woodbridge**	**6**	1	**6**
(United States) **B Pearce**	3	**7**	**6**
(Australia) P Cash	**6**	6	3
11	(Australia) **W Masur**	4	**7**	**7**
(United States) D Goldie	**6**	6	5
(United States) **P Chamberlin**	**6**	**7**
6	(Socialist Federal Republic of Yugoslavia) G Ivanišević	1	6

Third round
(Australia) **T Woodbridge**	**6**	**6**
(United States) B Pearce	4	4
11	(Australia) **W Masur**	6	**6**	**6**
(United States) P Chamberlin	**7**	3	3

Quarterfinals
(Australia) **T Woodbridge**	**7^{7}**	3	**7**
11	(Australia) W Masur	6^{5}	**6**	5

=== Bottom half ===
==== Section 3 ====
First round
Q	(Australia) S Barr	5	3
(Australia) **J Anderson**	**7**	**6**
(Sweden) **A Järryd**	**7**	5	**6**
Q	(United States) D Cassidy	6	**7**	1
(Israel) G Bloom	3	5
12	(United States) **J Grabb**	**6**	**7**
13	(Israel) **A Mansdorf**	**6**	**6**
(Puerto Rico) M Nido	1	1
WC	(United States) C Adams	3	6
Q	(Venezuela) **C Claverie**	**6**	**7**
(United States) T Wilkison	4	2
Q	(Italy) **C Caratti**	**6**	**6**

Second round
5	(Soviet Union) **A Chesnokov**	**6**	**6**
(Australia) J Anderson	2	2
(Sweden) A Järryd	3	2
12	(United States) **J Grabb**	**6**	**6**
13	(Israel) **A Mansdorf**	**6**	**6**
Q	(Venezuela) C Claverie	3	2
Q	(Italy) **C Caratti**	**6**	**6**
3	(United States) B Gilbert	4	4

Third round
5	(Soviet Union) **A Chesnokov**	**7**	**6**
12	(United States) J Grabb	6	3
13	(Israel) A Mansdorf	**7**	6	3
Q	(Italy) **C Caratti**	5	**7**	**6**

Quarterfinals
5	(Soviet Union) **A Chesnokov**	**6**	**6**
Q	(Italy) C Caratti	2	1

==== Section 4 ====
First round
(United States) **D Rostagno**	4	**7**	**6**
(United States) P Annacone	**6**	6	2
(United States) **J Arias**	**6**	**6**
(Peru) J Yzaga	1	3
(United States) **J Pugh**	3	**6**	**6**
10	(Czechoslovakia) P Korda	**6**	4	1
16	(South Africa) **C van Rensburg**	**6**	**6**
Q	(Sweden) M Zeile	4	1
(Canada) C Pridham	2	**6**	1^{r}
(Canada) **M Wostenholme**	**6**	3	4
Q	(Mexico) **L Herrera**	**6**	**6**
(Czechoslovakia) M Střelba	3	3

Second round
8	(United States) T Mayotte	**6**	4	3
(United States) **D Rostagno**	4	**6**	**6**
(United States) J Arias	4	2
(United States) **J Pugh**	**6**	**6**
16	(South Africa) **C van Rensburg**	**6**	**6**
(Canada) M Wostenholme	1	4
Q	(Mexico) L Herrera	5	**7**	1
WC/2	(Ecuador) **A Gómez**	**7**	5	**6**

Third round
(United States) **D Rostagno**	**6**	**6**
(United States) J Pugh	2	2
16	(South Africa) **C van Rensburg**	**7**	6	**7**
WC/2	(Ecuador) A Gómez	5	**7**	6

Quarterfinals
(United States) **D Rostagno**	**7**	**6**
16	(South Africa) C van Rensburg	5	0
