= 1990 Volvo International =

- Date: August 13–20
- Edition: 18th
- Category: Championship Series
- Draw: 64S / 32D
- Prize money: $825,000
- Surface: Hard / outdoor
- Location: New Haven, Connecticut, U.S.
- Venue: Cullman-Heyman Tennis Center

Champions

Singles
- (United States) Derrick Rostagno

Doubles
- (United States) Jeff Brown / (United States) Scott Melville
- Volvo International

The 1990 Volvo International was a men's tennis tournament played on outdoor hard courts in New Haven, Connecticut in the United States and was part of the Championship Series of the 1990 ATP Tour. It was the 18th edition of the tournament and ran from August 13 through August 20, 1990. Unseeded Derrick Rostagno won the singles title.

== Finals ==
=== Singles ===
(United States) Derrick Rostagno defeated (Australia) Todd Woodbridge 6–3, 6–3

- It was Rostagno's only title of the year and the 1st of his career.

=== Doubles ===
(United States) Jeff Brown / (United States) Scott Melville defeated (Socialist Federal Republic of Yugoslavia) Goran Ivanišević / (Czechoslovakia) Petr Korda 2–6, 7–5, 6–0

- It was Brown's only title of the year and the 1st of his career. It was Melville's only title of the year and the 1st of his career.
