= 1992 Volvo International =

- Date: August 17–24
- Edition: 20th
- Category: Championship Series
- Draw: 64S / 32D
- Prize money: $865,000
- Surface: Hard / outdoor
- Location: New Haven, Connecticut, U.S.
- Venue: Cullman-Heyman Tennis Center

Champions

Singles
- (Sweden) Stefan Edberg

Doubles
- (United States) Kelly Jones / (United States) Rick Leach
- Volvo International

The 1992 Volvo International was a men's tennis tournament played on outdoor hard courts at the Cullman-Heyman Tennis Center in New Haven, Connecticut in the United States and was part of the Championship Series of the 1992 ATP Tour. It was the 20th edition of the tournament and ran from August 17 through August 24, 1992. First-seeded Stefan Edberg won the singles title.

== Finals ==
=== Singles ===
(Sweden) Stefan Edberg defeated (United States) MaliVai Washington 7–6^{(7–4)}, 6–1

- It was Edberg's 2nd singles title of the year and the 35th of his career.

=== Doubles ===
(United States) Kelly Jones / (United States) Rick Leach defeated (United States) Patrick McEnroe / (United States) Jared Palmer 7–6, 6–7, 6–2

- It was Jones' 2nd title of the year and the 9th of his career. It was Leach's 2nd title of the year and the 22nd of his career.
