= 1992 Volvo International – Singles =

Singles
- 1992 Volvo International

Final
- Champion: (Sweden) Stefan Edberg
- Runner-up: (United States) MaliVai Washington
- Score: 7–6^{(7–4)}, 6–1

Details
- Draw: 56
- Seeds: 16

Events
Singles	Doubles
- Volvo International

Petr Korda was the defending champion but lost in the quarterfinals to Fabrice Santoro.

Stefan Edberg won in the final 7–6^{(7–4)}, 6–1 against MaliVai Washington.

== Seeds ==
A champion seed is indicated in bold text while text in italics indicates the round in which that seed was eliminated. The top eight seeds received a bye to the second round.

1. (Sweden) **Stefan Edberg (champion)**
2. (Croatia) Goran Ivanišević (quarterfinals)
3. (United States) Michael Chang (quarterfinals)
4. (Czechoslovakia) Petr Korda (semifinals)
5. (United States) Ivan Lendl (semifinals)
6. (Netherlands) Richard Krajicek (second round)
7. (France) Guy Forget (quarterfinals)
8. (United States) MaliVai Washington (final)
9. (United States) John McEnroe (third round)
10. (Commonwealth of Independent States) Alexander Volkov (third round)
11. (United States) Brad Gilbert (second round)
12. (Israel) Amos Mansdorf (third round)
13. (Switzerland) Jakob Hlasek (first round)
14. (Commonwealth of Independent States) Andrei Cherkasov (third round)
15. (Italy) Omar Camporese (first round)
16. (Netherlands) Paul Haarhuis (third round)

== Draw ==
Key

- Q = Qualifier
- WC = Wild card
- LL = Lucky loser
- Alt = Alternate
- ITF = ITF entry
- PR = Protected ranking
- SR = Special ranking
- SE = Special exempt
- JE = Junior exempt
- JR = Junior Accelerator Programme entrant
- CO = College Accelerator Programme entrant
- NG = Next Gen Accelerator Program entrant
- w/o = Walkover
- r = Retired
- d = Defaulted

=== Finals ===
Semifinals
1	(Sweden) **Stefan Edberg**	**7^{7}**	4	**6**
5	(United States) Ivan Lendl	6^{2}	**6**	3
(France) Fabrice Santoro	4	2
8	(United States) **MaliVai Washington**	**6**	**6**

Final
1	(Sweden) **Stefan Edberg**	**7^{7}**	**6**
8	(United States) MaliVai Washington	6^{4}	1

=== Top half ===
==== Section 1 ====
First round
Q	(United States) I Baron	6^{2}	4
Q	(United States) **B Farrow**	**7^{7}**	**6**
(Brazil) F Roese	0	2
Q	(Canada) **S Lareau**	**6**	**6**
(Commonwealth of Independent States) A Chesnokov	2	3
16	(Netherlands) **P Haarhuis**	**6**	**6**
10	(Commonwealth of Independent States) **A Volkov**	**6**	**6**
WC	(India) R Krishnan	3	3
(Australia) **T Woodbridge**	**6**	**7^{11}**
(Italy) D Nargiso	3	6^{9}
WC	(United States) **J Arias**	5	**6**	**6**
(Brazil) D Marcelino	**7**	2	4

Second round
1	(Sweden) **S Edberg**	**6**	**6**
Q	(United States) B Farrow	3	1
Q	(Canada) S Lareau	6^{5}	**7^{7}**	3
16	(Netherlands) **P Haarhuis**	**7^{7}**	6^{4}	**6**
10	(Commonwealth of Independent States) **A Volkov**	**6**	3	**7**
(Australia) T Woodbridge	4	**6**	5
WC	(United States) J Arias	**6**	3	5
7	(France) **G Forget**	4	**6**	**7**

Third round
1	(Sweden) **S Edberg**	**6**	**6**
16	(Netherlands) P Haarhuis	2	4
10	(Commonwealth of Independent States) A Volkov	6^{4}	6^{1}
7	(France) **G Forget**	**7^{7}**	**7^{7}**

Quarterfinals
1	(Sweden) **S Edberg**	**6**	6^{3}	**6**
7	(France) G Forget	3	**7^{7}**	4

==== Section 2 ====
First round
Q	(Australia) P Kilderry	**6**	2	2
(Italy) **G Pozzi**	2	**6**	**6**
(Zimbabwe) **B Black**	**6**	**6**
(United Kingdom) J Bates	1	0
(Commonwealth of Independent States) A Olhovskiy	**6**	4	6^{5}
14	(Commonwealth of Independent States) **A Cherkasov**	4	**6**	**7^{7}**
12	(Israel) **A Mansdorf**	**6**	1	**6**
(Australia) M Woodforde	1	**6**	4
(United States) J Tarango	3	0
(Australia) **W Masur**	**6**	**6**
(Japan) **S Matsuoka**	**7**	2
(Brazil) J Oncins	5	1^{r}

Second round
3	(United States) **M Chang**	**6**	**6**
(Italy) G Pozzi	3	3
(Zimbabwe) B Black	1	**6**	4
14	(Commonwealth of Independent States) **A Cherkasov**	**6**	3	**6**
12	(Israel) **A Mansdorf**	2	**7**	**7^{7}**
(Australia) W Masur	**6**	5	6^{3}
(Japan) S Matsuoka	3	4
5	(United States) **I Lendl**	**6**	**6**

Third round
3	(United States) **M Chang**	**6**	**6**
14	(Commonwealth of Independent States) A Cherkasov	2	1
12	(Israel) A Mansdorf	2	3
5	(United States) **I Lendl**	**6**	**6**

Quarterfinals
3	(United States) M Chang	3	6^{7}
5	(United States) **I Lendl**	**6**	**7^{9}**

=== Bottom half ===
==== Section 3 ====
First round
Q	(Commonwealth of Independent States) Y Kafelnikov	2	1
WC	(United States) **A O'Brien**	**6**	**6**
(France) **F Santoro**	**6**	**6**
(South Africa) C van Rensburg	3	1
Q	(United States) M Jensen	0	1
11	(United States) **B Gilbert**	**6**	**6**
13	(Switzerland) J Hlasek	6^{5}	6^{5}
(United States) **C Adams**	**7^{7}**	**7^{7}**
(Peru) **J Yzaga**	**7**	**6**
(Netherlands) J Siemerink	5	4
(Spain) J Burillo	3	2
(France) **A Boetsch**	**6**	**6**

Second round
6	(Netherlands) R Krajicek	6^{3}	6^{2}
WC	(United States) **A O'Brien**	**7^{7}**	**7^{7}**
(France) **F Santoro**	**6**	**7^{7}**
11	(United States) B Gilbert	0	6^{5}
(United States) **C Adams**	**7^{7}**	**6**
(Peru) J Yzaga	6^{5}	4
(France) A Boetsch
4	(Czechoslovakia) **P Korda**	w/o

Third round
WC	(United States) A O'Brien	3	3
(France) **F Santoro**	**6**	**6**
(United States) C Adams	4	**7^{7}**	4
4	(Czechoslovakia) **P Korda**	**6**	6^{3}	**6**

Quarterfinals
(France) **F Santoro**	**7^{8}**	4	**6**
4	(Czechoslovakia) P Korda	6^{6}	**6**	3

==== Section 4 ====
First round
(Israel) G Bloom	5	1
(Mexico) **L Herrera**	**7**	**6**
(France) **T Guardiola**	**6**	3	**6**
Q	(Australia) B Dyke	4	**6**	3
(Sweden) J Apell	1	5
WC/9	(United States) **J McEnroe**	**6**	**7**
15	(Italy) O Camporese	**6**	5	2
(Czechoslovakia) **M Damm**	4	**7**	**6**
(Brazil) L Mattar	**6**	3	3
(Switzerland) **M Rosset**	4	**6**	**6**
(United States) P McEnroe	2	6^{6}
(United States) **B Shelton**	**6**	**7^{8}**

Second round
8	(United States) **M Washington**	**6**	**6**
(Mexico) L Herrera	4	3
(France) T Guardiola	**7^{8}**	5	6^{3}
WC/9	(United States) **J McEnroe**	6^{6}	**7**	**7^{7}**
(Czechoslovakia) M Damm	2	2
(Switzerland) **M Rosset**	**6**	**6**
(United States) B Shelton	3	5
2	(Croatia) **G Ivanišević**	**6**	**7**

Third round
8	(United States) **M Washington**	**7^{7}**	**6**
WC/9	(United States) J McEnroe	6^{0}	3
(Switzerland) M Rosset	**6**	6^{5}	4
2	(Croatia) **G Ivanišević**	3	**7^{7}**	**6**

Quarterfinals
8	(United States) **M Washington**	**6**	**7**
2	(Croatia) G Ivanišević	4	5
