= Pieology =

American pizza restaurant chain

Pieology Pizzeria
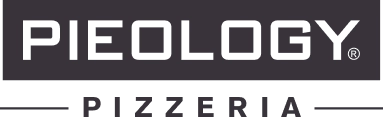

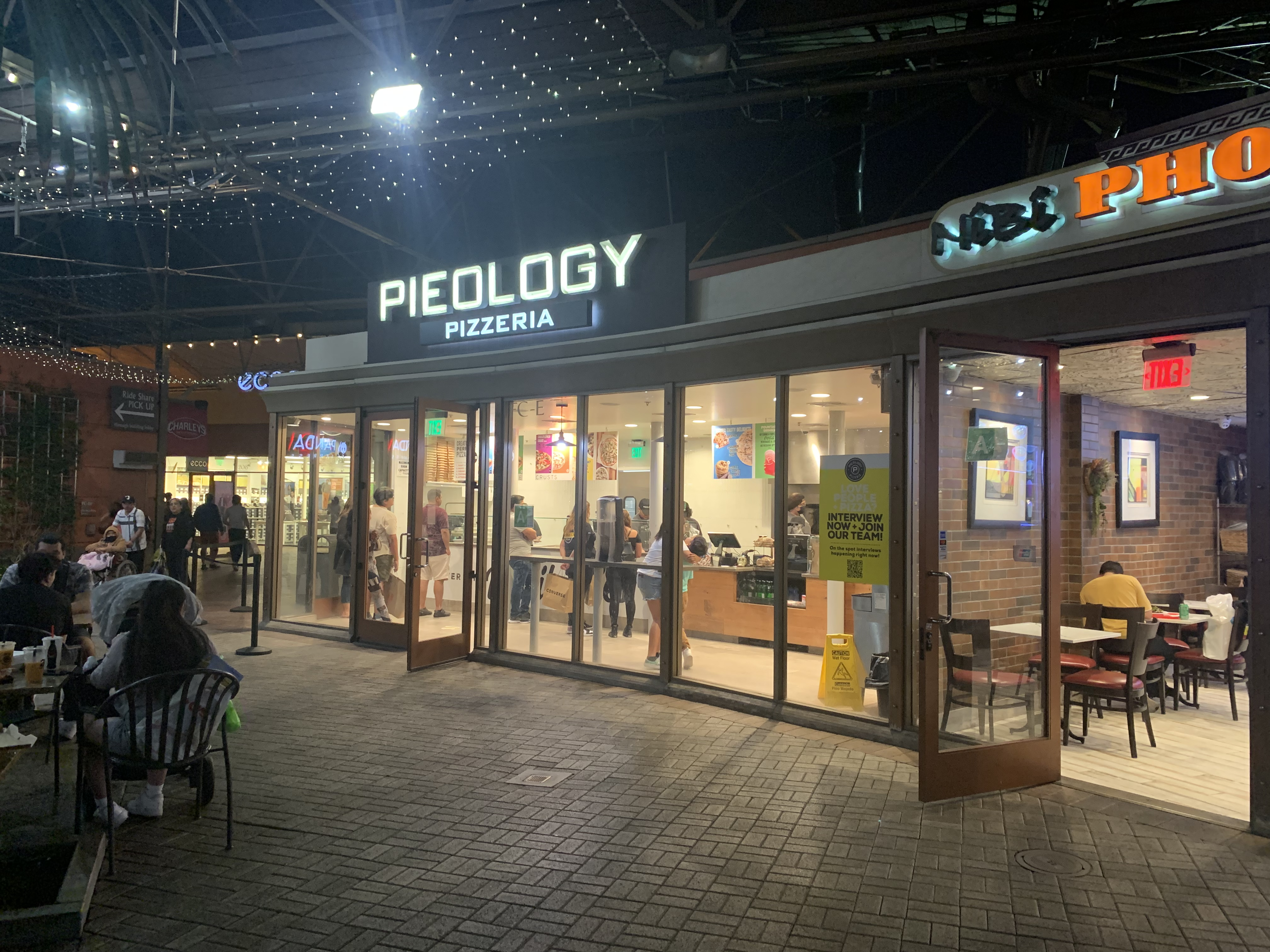
- A Pieology Pizzeria at Citadel Outlets in Los Angeles, California.
- Type: Private
- Industry: Restaurants
- Genre: Fast casual
- Founded: March 2011; 15 years ago in Fullerton, California as Pie-ology Pizzeria
- Founders: Carl Chang; James Markham
- Fate: Chapter 11 bankruptcy
- Headquarters: Tustin, California, United States
- Number of locations: 140 (September 2018)
- Areas served: United States; China; Mexico; Spain
- Products: Pizza, salad, desserts, drinks
- Website: pieology.com

Pieology Pizzeria is an American pizza chain within the fast-casual dining restaurants category. Founded in 2011 by Carl Chang, the brother of former tennis player Michael Chang, Pieology's mission is to "turn one of America's favorite food into an affordable and interactive experience". Pieology's main rivals are Blaze Pizza and MOD Pizza. By October 2018, Pieology had a single unit in Mexico plus approximately 140 units in 23 American states and territories with more than half of those restaurants located in the state of California.

== Concept ==
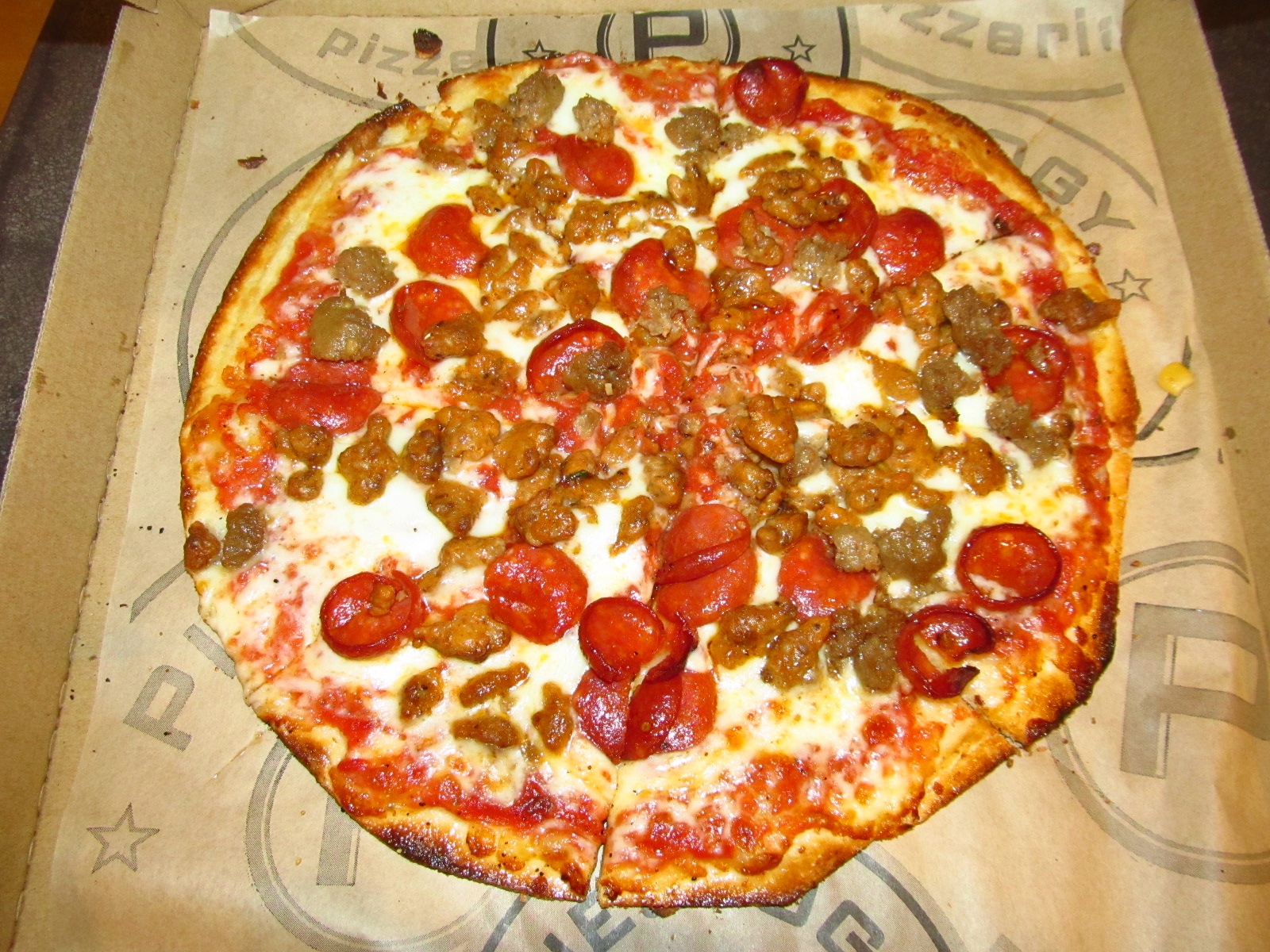
A Pieology Pizza.

Similar to their competitors, Pieology offers individual, artisan style pizzas, which are baked in a high-temperature open-flame oven. Customers begin by choosing which of the ingredients they'd like on their pizza pie. As customers work their way down the service line, staff assemble a pizza based on customer instructions. When they arrive at the end of the line, their custom-built pizza is ready to be cooked.

Pieology offers several signature pizzas, as well as "build your own" custom pizzas. In addition, their menu includes salads and desserts.

Each Pieology restaurant is meant to be an "environment that [creates] inspiration", with a quote board in every store that features inspirational quotes.

== History ==
The first Pieology was opened in March 2011 in Fullerton, California, just a few blocks away from the campus of California State University, Fullerton, by partners Carl Chang and James Markham. During its first few months of operation, the business was known as Pie-ology Pizzeria. Chang and Markham were previously involved with the development of MOD Pizza. Markham left the partnership the following year. After the success of the first location, a second location was opened in nearby Irvine (near the campus of University of California, Irvine) in November 2012. For the first few years, initial growth was restricted to company-owned locations in Southern California.

In September 2014, Pieology expanded into the state of Minnesota, opening a location in Mankato with the assistance of Minnesota Vikings offensive tackle Matt Kalil as the local franchise owner. During the same month, Pieology expanded into the state of Arizona, opening a location in Tucson.

By October 2014, the company had 35 units in eight states.

In 2015, Pieology was the fastest growing restaurant chain in America, according to data from Technomic.

In March 2016, Pieology expanded into the state of Hawaii, opening a location in Aina Haina with the help of franchise partner Cotti Foods.

In May 2016, Pieology opened its first location outside the continental United States in the city of Tamuning in the American territory of Guam with the help of a local franchise partner.

In 2016, Pieology received an investment from Andrew and Peggy Cherng, the founders of Panda Restaurant Group. Later in that year, Pieology acquired one of its rivals, Project Pie.

In December 2025, Pieology filed for Chapter 11 bankruptcy protection after seeking court approval of a debt repayment plan; the original Fullerton restaurant soon shut down.

== International expansion ==
=== Mexico ===
In January 2018, Pieology opened their first location outside of the United States in the Polanco neighborhood of Mexico City with the help of Mexican franchise partner OPFRA S.A. de C.V.

A third location in Mexico opened in September 2019 near Anahuac University in Mexico City.

=== Spain ===
In March 2018, Pieology announced plans to expand into Spain with a focus towards a franchise model via a licensing agreement with the Comess Group. The first Spanish restaurant opened in Madrid in September 2018.

=== China ===
In July 2020, Pieology opened their first Chinese location in Shanghai via a franchise agreement with TZG Partners.

=== Canada ===
In February 2016, the company announced plans to open locations in Canada. As of September 2021, no franchise partner has step forward to make these plans a reality.

=== United Kingdom ===
In July 2021, Camyabco Ltd. signed an agreement with the company to open its first U.K. location in London.
