= Albert Chang =

Canadian tennis player

- Country (sports): Canada
- Born: 27 February 1971 (age 55) Vancouver, British Columbia
- Height: 6 ft 0 in (183 cm)
- Plays: Right-handed
- Prize money: $212,100

Singles
- Career record: 7–18
- Highest ranking: No. 140 (11 September 1995)

Grand Slam singles results
- Wimbledon: 1R (1995, 1996)
- US Open: 1R (1994)

Doubles
- Career record: 2–7
- Highest ranking: No. 212 (22 August 1994)

Albert Chang (born 27 February 1971) is a Canadian former professional tour tennis player. Chang reached a career high singles ranking of world No. 140 in September 1995 and won two Challenger tournaments. He also played Davis Cup for Canada.

Chang was Canada's national junior champion in 1988 and played collegiately at Harvard University, graduating with a degree in biology in 1992. He joined the pro tour in November of the same year, and won his first round match in each of his first three Challengers in singles while in doubles he reached the second round (i.e. the quarter-finals) in his first two events – Halifax and Launceston – while in the third he reached the semi-finals. In just his fifth Challenger, Chang reached the final, of the Vancouver Challenger, and lost it to Kenny Thorne.

Chang, a native in Calgary, took the singles title at the Celle Challenger, in February 1994. Two months later he won a couple of doubles titles, while partnering a couple of doubles legends, first with Daniel Nestor (Nagoya Challenger) and after that with Leander Paes (Manila Challenger). He won one final Challenger in July 1996, the Aptos Challenger.

Chang appeared in the main draw of a Grand Slam tournament three times, all in singles – the 1994 U.S. Open, 1995 Wimbledon Championships, and 1996 Wimbledon Championships. In all three events he lost in the first round, winning only one set. Chang's best result in an ATP Tour event was reaching the quarter-finals of the 1994 Beijing Grand Prix and 1995 Volvo International in singles and the same round in doubles partnering Brian Gyetko at the 1994 Canadian Open.

Chang contested two Davis Cup rubbers in two separate ties. In 1995 versus Colombia he won a dead rubber over Carlos Drada on carpet in Kelowna. The following year he lost to Jimy Szymanski in the deciding rubber in an away tie versus Venezuela.

== Personal ==
Chang's father, Airman, is a pathologist and a native of Hong Kong while his mother, Yolanda, a botanist, is a native of Taiwan.
