= Ian Williams (tennis) =

American tennis player

- Country (sports): United States
- Born: 6 August 1971 (age 55)

Singles
- Highest ranking: No. 638 (May 22, 1995)

Doubles
- Career record: 0–1
- Highest ranking: No. 222 (July 31, 1995)

Ian Williams (born 6 August 1971) is an American former professional tennis player.

As a junior, Williams was ranked No. 2 in Boys' 18 Singles in the United States Tennis Association Southern Section and No. 22 nationally. At the 1989 Boys' Junior National Tennis Championship, he lost to Michael Joyce (highest ATP rank No. 64) in the first round of the Boys' 18 Singles. Williams was ranked No. 2 in doubles as a junior.

He played collegiate tennis at Harvard University, helping the Crimson win the Ivy League Title as a freshman, before transferring to the University of Texas for his final two seasons. In 1993, he went 41-10 in singles, and was runner-up to Texas teammate Chad Clark at the ITA All-American Championships, and rose to No. 6 in the national collegiate rankings. He helped the Longhorns win the SWC championships and reach the NCAA semifinals that year.

Williams played on the Association of Tennis Professionals World Tour in 1994-1995. For the two years on the tour, Williams had a best singles world ranking of 638. In doubles he reached a best ranking of 222 and made an ATP Tour main draw appearance at the 1995 Volvo International in New Haven. He also won an ATP Challenger doubles title in 1995, partnering Ivan Baron in Quito. He has career wins over Gustavo Kuerten, Nicolás Lapentti and Mahesh Bhupathi.

Following his tennis career, Williams returned to Harvard to complete his economics degree.

== ATP Challenger finals ==
=== Doubles: 1 (1–0) ===
Result	No.	Date	Tournament	Surface	Partner	Opponents	Score
Win	1.	Jul 1995	Quito, Ecuador	Clay	(United States) Ivan Baron	(Ecuador) Pablo Campana (Ecuador) Nicolás Lapentti	6–3, 2–6, 6–3
