= 1994 Volvo International =

Tennis tournament

- Date: August 15–22
- Edition: 22nd
- Category: Championship Series
- Draw: 56S / 28D
- Prize money: $915,000
- Surface: Hard / outdoor
- Location: New Haven, Connecticut, U.S.
- Venue: Cullman-Heyman Tennis Center

Champions

Singles
- (Germany) Boris Becker

Doubles
- (Canada) Grant Connell / (United States) Patrick Galbraith
- Volvo International

The 1994 Volvo International was a men's tennis tournament played on outdoor hard courts at the Cullman-Heyman Tennis Center in New Haven, Connecticut in the United States and was part of the Championship Series of the 1994 ATP Tour. It was the 22nd edition of the tournament and ran from August 15 through August 22, 1994. Third-seeded Boris Becker won the singles title.

== Finals ==
=== Singles ===
(Germany) Boris Becker defeated (Switzerland) Marc Rosset 6–3, 7–5

- It was Becker's 3rd singles title of the year and the 41st of his career.

=== Doubles ===
(Canada) Grant Connell / (United States) Patrick Galbraith defeated (Netherlands) Jacco Eltingh / (Netherlands) Paul Haarhuis 6–4, 7–6

- It was Connell's 3rd title of the year and the 10th of his career. It was Galbraith's 3rd title of the year and the 18th of his career.
