= MOD Pizza =

American fast-casual pizza chain

MOD Super Fast Pizza LLC
- Trade name: MOD Pizza
- Type: Private
- Industry: Restaurants
- Genre: Fast casual
- Founded: 2008; 18 years ago in Seattle, Washington
- Founders: Scott Svenson; Ally Svenson; James Markham
- Headquarters: Bellevue, Washington, United States
- Number of locations: 500+ (2021)
- Areas served: United States; United Kingdom (until 2020); Canada
- Key people: Scott Svenson (Executive Chairperson - fmr); Ally Svenson (Protector of the Purpose - fmr)
- Products: Pizza, Salad
- Revenue: $398 million (2019)
- Parent: Elite Restaurant Group (2024–present)
- Website: modpizza.com

MOD Pizza is an American fast-casual pizza restaurant chain based in Seattle, Washington. Founded in 2008, MOD has more than 460 locations as of December 2024 in the United States and 2 locations in Canada.

== Concept and products ==
The company's name is an acronym which stands for "Made on Demand." MOD Pizza operates as a build-your-own style restaurant, where the food is made in front of the customer on-demand.

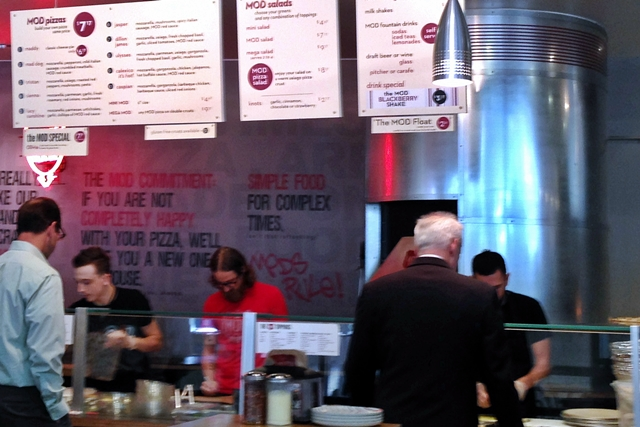
The interior of a MOD Pizza restaurant, pictured in 2014

== History ==
MOD Pizza was established in 2008 in Seattle, Washington, by co-founders Scott and Ally Svenson. The Svensons previously founded the Seattle Coffee Company, a coffee company based in the United Kingdom, which they sold to Starbucks in 1998. Afterwards, Scott stayed on as president of Starbucks Europe.

The Svensons also helped found Carluccio's Ltd., an Italian restaurant in the U.K. After moving back to their home town of Bellevue, Washington, the Svensons started MOD Pizza after being unable to find fast, affordable healthy meals for their four sons.

James Markham, who had previously started pizza parlors in San Diego, California and Shanghai, China, was also a part of the founding team and helped develop the house recipes used by MOD. The restaurant's first location was in Union Square and was followed by additional Seattle locations.

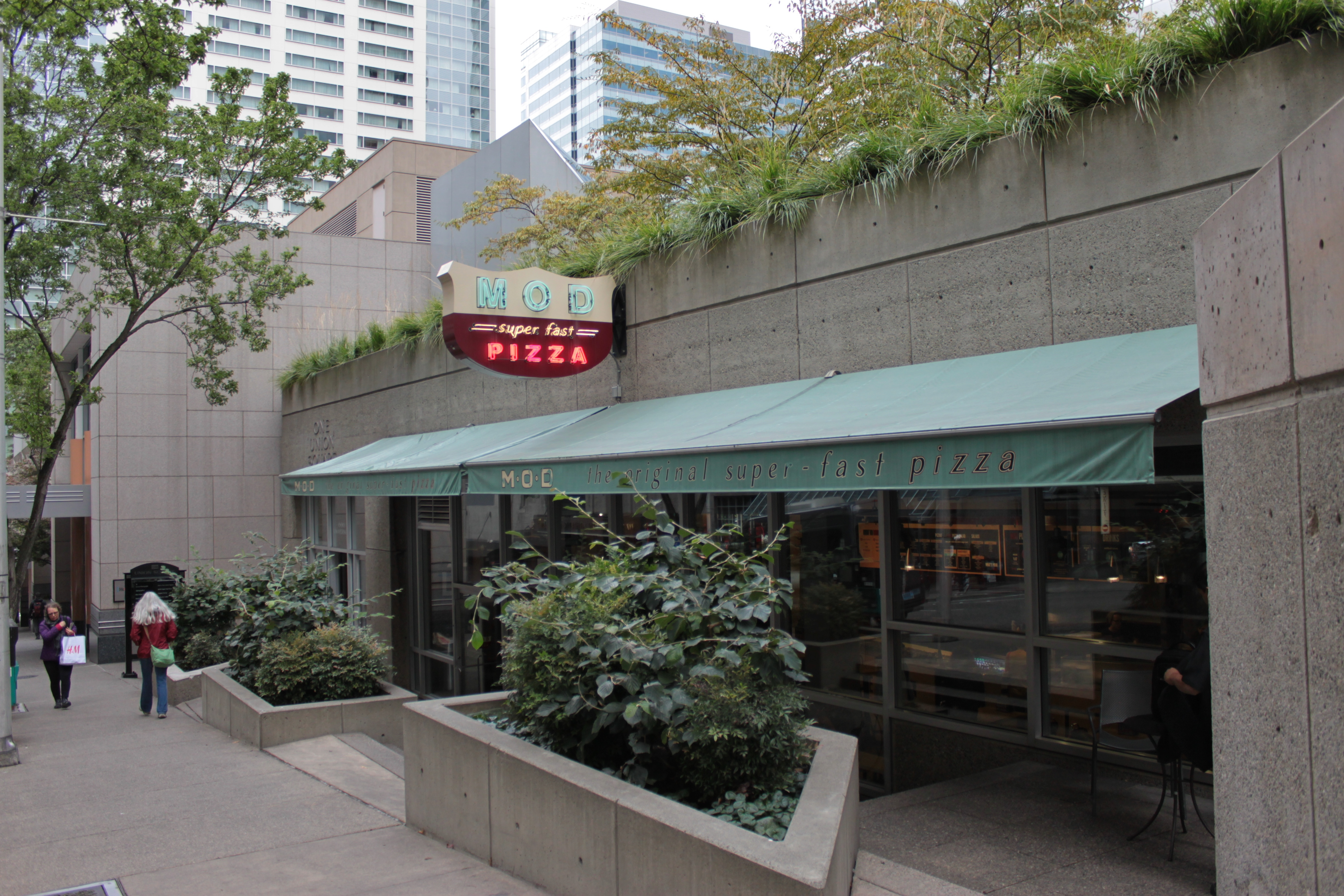
The first MOD Pizza location, at Union Square in Downtown Seattle, Washington

By 2010, Markham had left MOD Pizza due to what he later characterized as a dispute in direction with the Svensons. He subsequently started a California-based chain set on MOD's "DIY" pizza concept called Pieology.

=== Growth and expansion ===
In 2013, the restaurant chain was named one of the United States' "Top 50 Breakout Brands" by Nation's Restaurant News.

By 2014, MOD Pizza had 31 locations in Washington, Oregon, California, Arizona, Colorado, and Texas. The same year the company secured $15 million in private investment.

In 2015, MOD Pizza raised $40 million in new funding for a total of $70 million in investment capital to fund an aggressive national growth strategy. The main investor was the private equity fund PWP Growth Equity. MOD's growth is also accelerated by the addition of several franchise partnerships. The business reached the 1,700-employee milestone in August 2015.

In March 2016, MOD Pizza announced that they had secured $32 million in a funding round and had plans to expand to 190 stores. In June, the company opened their first international location in Leeds, United Kingdom.

Additional expansion in the United Kingdom with joint venture partner Sir Charles Dunstone and his business partner, Roger Taylor, began in 2015. MOD named John Nelson, formerly of Nando's, Ltd. (U.K.), as their CEO of U.K. operations in January 2016. MOD Pizza closed all nine UK locations in 2020.

In its tenth year of business, MOD announced the opening of its 300th location in 2018.

=== Closures and acquisition ===
On January 9, 2024 It was announced that founder Scott Svenson would be stepping down to a new role as Executive Chairperson, and Beth Scott, previously of Cooper's Hawk Winery & Restaurants would take over as CEO.

In April 2024, MOD Pizza abruptly shuttered 27 restaurants permanently as part of a mass downsizing.

In July 2024, rumors circulated of a potential Chapter 11 bankruptcy filing, though this never occurred. By this time, the company had closed 44 restaurants. The company blamed closures on declining sales caused by the COVID-19 pandemic and rising interest costs as part of the decision. A spokesperson said the closed stores were experiencing "sustained under-performance" and "were closed due to unfavorable lease and site decisions made during a period of rapid expansion prior to the pandemic".

On July 10, 2024, MOD reached an agreement to sell itself to Elite Restaurant Group. Terms of the agreement were not disclosed.

== See also ==
- List of pizza chains of the United States
