= 1994 Volvo International – Doubles =

Tennis tournament

Doubles
- 1994 Volvo International
- 1993 Champions: (Czech Republic) Cyril Suk (Czech Republic) Daniel Vacek

Final
- Champions: (Canada) Grant Connell (United States) Patrick Galbraith
- Runners-up: (Netherlands) Jacco Eltingh (Netherlands) Paul Haarhuis
- Score: 6–4, 7–6

Details
- Draw: 28
- Seeds: 8

Events
Singles	Doubles
- Volvo International

Cyril Suk and Daniel Vacek were the defending champions but lost in the first round to Alex O'Brien and Sandon Stolle.

Grant Connell and Patrick Galbraith won in the final 6–4, 7–6 against Jacco Eltingh and Paul Haarhuis.

== Seeds ==
Champion seeds are indicated in bold text while text in italics indicates the round in which those seeds were eliminated. The top four seeded teams received byes into the second round.

1. (Canada) **Grant Connell** / (United States) **Patrick Galbraith (champions)**
2. (Netherlands) Jacco Eltingh / (Netherlands) Paul Haarhuis (final)
3. (Sweden) Jan Apell / (Sweden) Jonas Björkman (second round)
4. (South Africa) David Adams / (Russia) Andrei Olhovskiy (semifinals)
5. (United States) Patrick McEnroe / (United States) Jared Palmer (quarterfinals)
6. (Czech Republic) Cyril Suk / (Czech Republic) Daniel Vacek (first round)
7. (Russia) Yevgeny Kafelnikov / (Czech Republic) David Rikl (first round)
8. (United States) Mike Bauer / (Canada) Sébastien Lareau (first round)

== Draw ==
Key

- Q = Qualifier
- WC = Wild card
- LL = Lucky loser
- Alt = Alternate
- ITF = ITF entry
- PR = Protected ranking
- SR = Special ranking
- SE = Special exempt
- JE = Junior exempt
- JR = Junior Accelerator Programme entrant
- CO = College Accelerator Programme entrant
- NG = Next Gen Accelerator Program entrant
- w/o = Walkover
- r = Retired
- d = Defaulted

=== Final ===
Final
1	(Canada) **Grant Connell** (United States) **Patrick Galbraith**	**6**	**7**
2	(Netherlands) Jacco Eltingh (Netherlands) Paul Haarhuis	3	6

=== Top half ===
First round
(Canada) D Nestor (South Africa) G Stafford	3	4
(United Kingdom) **N Broad** (United States) **G Van Emburgh**	**6**	**6**
Q	(Sweden) T Johansson (Sweden) M Renström	**6**	6	2
WC	(United States) **B Gilbert** (Switzerland) **M Rosset**	3	**7**	**6**
WC	(Zimbabwe) **B Black** (Zimbabwe) **W Black**	**6**	**6**
8	(United States) M Bauer (Canada) S Lareau	2	4
(United States) **T Kronemann** (Australia) **D Macpherson**	2	**6**	**7**
Q	(United States) K Jones (United States) M Lucena	**6**	3	6
(United States) **D Johnson** (United States) **T. J. Middleton**	6	**7**	**6**
(Germany) M-K Goellner (Australia) P Rafter	**7**	6	4
(United States) B Garnett (Venezuela) N Pereira	6	1
5	(United States) **P McEnroe** (United States) **J Palmer**	**7**	**6**

Second round
1	(Canada) **G Connell** (United States) **P Galbraith**	**7**	**7**
(United Kingdom) N Broad (United States) G Van Emburgh	6	6
WC	(United States) B Gilbert (Switzerland) M Rosset
WC	(Zimbabwe) **B Black** (Zimbabwe) **W Black**	w/o
3	(Sweden) J Apell (Sweden) J Björkman	**6**	3	2
(United States) **T Kronemann** (Australia) **D Macpherson**	4	**6**	**6**
(United States) D Johnson (United States) T. J. Middleton	6	5
5	(United States) **P McEnroe** (United States) **J Palmer**	**7**	**7**

Quarterfinals
1	(Canada) **G Connell** (United States) **P Galbraith**	2	**6**	**6**
WC	(Zimbabwe) B Black (Zimbabwe) W Black	**6**	0	1
(United States) **T Kronemann** (Australia) **D Macpherson**	**6**	**6**
5	(United States) P McEnroe (United States) J Palmer	4	4

Semifinals
1	(Canada) **G Connell** (United States) **P Galbraith**	**7**	**6**
(United States) T Kronemann (Australia) D Macpherson	6	4

=== Bottom half ===
First round
6	(Czech Republic) C Suk (Czech Republic) D Vacek	6	6
(United States) **A O'Brien** (Australia) **S Stolle**	**7**	**7**
(United States) P Annacone (United States) S Cannon	3	4
WC	(United States) **C Adams** (United States) **V Spadea**	**6**	**6**
(United States) **L Jensen** (Netherlands) **J Siemerink**	**6**	6	**6**
(Argentina) J Garat (Venezuela) M Ruah	3	**7**	2
7	(Russia) Y Kafelnikov (Czech Republic) D Rikl	4	3
(Czech Republic) **M Damm** (Germany) **M Stich**	**6**	**6**
(United States) M Keil (Malaysia) A Malik	**7**	4	4
(South Africa) **M Barnard** (South Africa) **B Haygarth**	6	**6**	**6**
(South Africa) S Kruger (South Africa) C van Rensburg	4	**6**	2
WC	(United States) **MV Washington** (United States) **M Washington**	**6**	3	**6**

Second round
(United States) **A O'Brien** (Australia) **S Stolle**	**6**	**7**
WC	(United States) C Adams (United States) V Spadea	2	5
(United States) L Jensen (Netherlands) J Siemerink	**7**	2	6
4	(South Africa) **D Adams** (Russia) **A Olhovskiy**	6	**6**	**7**
(Czech Republic) **M Damm** (Germany) **M Stich**	**6**	6	**6**
(South Africa) M Barnard (South Africa) B Haygarth	0	**6**	3
WC	(United States) MV Washington (United States) M Washington	4	4
2	(Netherlands) **J Eltingh** (Netherlands) **P Haarhuis**	**6**	**6**

Quarterfinals
(United States) A O'Brien (Australia) S Stolle	3	6
4	(South Africa) **D Adams** (Russia) **A Olhovskiy**	**6**	**7**
(Czech Republic) M Damm (Germany) M Stich	6	3
2	(Netherlands) **J Eltingh** (Netherlands) **P Haarhuis**	**7**	**6**

Semifinals
4	(South Africa) D Adams (Russia) A Olhovskiy	6	4
2	(Netherlands) **J Eltingh** (Netherlands) **P Haarhuis**	**7**	**6**
