= 1993 Volvo International =

- Date: August 16–23
- Edition: 21st
- Category: Championship Series
- Draw: 56S / 28D
- Prize money: $915,000
- Surface: Hard / outdoor
- Location: New Haven, Connecticut, U.S.
- Venue: Cullman-Heyman Tennis Center

Champions

Singles
- (Ukraine) Andriy Medvedev

Doubles
- (Czech Republic) Cyril Suk / (Czech Republic) Daniel Vacek
- Volvo International

The 1993 Volvo International was a men's tennis tournament played on outdoor hard courts at the Cullman-Heyman Tennis Center in New Haven, Connecticut, United States and was part of the Championship Series of the 1993 ATP Tour. It was the 21st edition of the tournament and ran from August 16 through August 23, 1993. Fifth-seeded Andriy Medvedev won the singles title.

== Finals ==
=== Singles ===
(Ukraine) Andriy Medvedev defeated (Czech Republic) Petr Korda, 7–5, 6–4

- It was Medvedev's 3rd and last singles title of the year and the 6th of his career.

=== Doubles ===
(Czech Republic) Cyril Suk / (Czech Republic) Daniel Vacek defeated (United States) Steve DeVries / (Australia) David Macpherson, 7–5, 6–4

- It was Suk's 3rd title of the year and the 9th of his career. It was Vacek's only title of the year and the 4th of his career.
