= Jerry Simmons (tennis) =

American tennis coach (1946–2023)

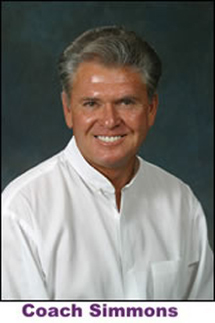

Biographical details
- Born: 1946; St. Paul, Minnesota, U.S.
- Died: February 27, 2023 (aged 76)

Playing career
- 1967–1969: West Texas State University

Coaching career (HC unless noted)
- 1971–1982: Southwestern Louisiana
- 1983–1997: LSU

Head coaching record
- Overall: 492–197 (.714)

Accomplishments and honors

Championships
- Southeastern Conference (1985)

Jerry Simmons (1946 – February 27, 2023) was an American tennis coach.

== Playing career ==
Simmons graduated from Amarillo High School in 1964 and then attended Amarillo College from 1964 thru 1965. He went on to attend West Texas State University, now West Texas A&M University, in Canyon, Texas, where he majored in English and History. He received his Bachelor's from West Texas State University in 1969.

== Coaching career ==
Coach Simmons began his career in 1970, coaching football at Longfellow Junior High School, then at McCarther High School, both located in San Antonio, Texas. In 1972, he began coaching for the Southwestern Louisiana in Lafayette, Louisiana, and coached there until 1982. In 1974, he became the United States Junior Davis Cup Coach. Starting in 1983, Simmons became the head men's tennis coach at Louisiana State University. He succeeded Steve Strome and recorded an overall record of 278–105 in 15 seasons as head coach of the Tigers. His teams played in 13 NCAA Tournaments, reaching the Final 8 in 1987, 1989, 1991, 1992, and 1993. His Tigers were NCAA Runner-Up in 1988 and finished the season 27–2. His 1985 Tigers were SEC Champions and his 1991, 1992, and 1995 teams finished as SEC Runner-Up. He was succeeded by Jeff Brown.

Simmons had 13 NCAA Top Ten finishes in 15-years as LSU Head Men's Tennis Coach. LSU is one of only 5 teams (LSU, Georgia, Stanford, USC, and UCLA) to accomplish this.

12 ITA National Indoor Champs. Final 1988; Final Eight 1985, 1989, 1990, 1991, 1992, 1993; Final Sixteen 1984, 1986, 1994, 1997.

Simmons became the founder and Circuit Director of the American ITF Junior circuit from 1999 to 2006. In 1998, Simmons created an ITF American Circuit to help young American tennis players earn world rankings with the International Tennis Federation.

One of the things Simmons is most famous for was the Cajuns Classic. Started in 1977, Simmons created the first corporate sponsored college tennis tournament in the nation. The Cajun Classic would become the nation's premier college tennis event.

Simmons was inducted into the Intercollegiate Tennis Association Hall of Fame in 1998, the youngest coach ever inducted into the Hall.

== Personal life and death ==
Simmons was born in St. Paul, Minnesota, in 1946, to Dorothy B. Simmons and Earl W. Simmons. He had one brother, Dr. Wayne Simmons, who lived in San Antonio, Texas. When Jerry Simmons was five years old, his family moved to Amarillo, Texas, and this is where he grew up.

Simmons was married and divorced twice. His first wife was Susan Meriwetatr, and his second wife was Sharon Marshall. He had no children but stated that "all of [his] players are [his] children." He died on February 27, 2023, at the age of 76.

Coaching record (1971–1997)

Overall Coaching Record:	492–197	26 Years	
Record at Southwestern Louisiana	214–92	11 Years	1971–1982
Record at LSU	278–105	15 Years	1982–1997
NCAA Finals			1988
NCAA Final Four			1988
NCAA Final Eight			1987, 1988, 1989, 1991, 1992
NCAA Final Sixteen			1984, 1985, 1986, 1990, 1993, 1995, 1996, 1997

Coaching honors

1977	Southland Conference Coach of the Year
1978	Southland Conference Coach of the Year
1979	Southland Conference Coach of the Year
1987	Louisiana Coach of the Year
1988	National coach of the year
1988	Southeastern Conference coach of the year
1988	Louisiana Coach of the Year
1989	Louisiana Coach of the Year
1991	Louisiana Coach of the Year
1992	Louisiana Coach of the Year
1993	Louisiana Coach of the Year
1995	Louisiana Coach of the Year
1996	Louisiana Coach of the Year
1997	Southeastern Conference coach of the year
1998	ITA College Tennis Hall of Fame Inductee (Youngest coach ever inducted)
