= Buff Farrow =

American tennis player

- Full name: Buff Farrow
- Country (sports): United States
- Born: May 28, 1967 (age 57); Wichita, Kansas, U.S.
- Height: 5 ft 7 in (170 cm)
- Prize money: $39,624

Singles
- Career record: 2–4
- Highest ranking: No. 224 (July 9, 1990)

Doubles
- Career record: 2–3
- Highest ranking: No. 294 (September 12, 1988)

Grand Slam doubles results
- US Open: 2R (1988)

Buff Farrow (born May 28, 1967) is a former professional tennis player from the United States.

== Biography ==
Born in Wichita, Farrow won the United States Amateur Championships in 1986 and played tennis for the UCLA Bruins. His collegiate career included making both the singles semi-finals and doubles final of the 1988 NCAA Division I Men's Tennis Championships.

Farrow competed in the men's doubles draw at the 1988 US Open with Greg Van Emburgh and made it to the second round, in what would be his only grand slam main draw appearance.

As a professional player he had the biggest win of his career at the 1993 Volvo International in New Haven, where he beat former world number one Mats Wilander, who was making a comeback to the tour.

== Challenger titles ==
=== Doubles: (1) ===
No.	Year	Tournament	Surface	Partner	Opponents	Score
1.	1988	Seattle, U.S.	Hard	(United States) Jim Gurfein	(United States) Patrick Galbraith (United States) Brian Garrow	6–1, 6–4
