= 1995 Volvo International =

- Date: August 14–21
- Edition: 23rd
- Category: Championship Series
- Draw: 64S / 32D
- Prize money: $915,000
- Surface: Hard / outdoor
- Location: New Haven, Connecticut, US
- Venue: Cullman-Heyman Tennis Center

Champions

Singles
- (United States) Andre Agassi

Doubles
- (United States) Rick Leach / (United States) Scott Melville
- Volvo International

The 1995 Volvo International was a men's tennis tournament played on outdoor hard courts at the Cullman-Heyman Tennis Center in New Haven, Connecticut in the United States and was part of the Championship Series of the 1995 ATP Tour. It was the 23rd edition of the tournament and ran from August 14 through August 21, 1995. First-seeded Andre Agassi won the singles title.

== Finals ==
=== Singles ===
(United States) Andre Agassi defeated (Netherlands) Richard Krajicek 3–6, 7–6^{(7–2)}, 6–3

- It was Agassi's 7th title of the year and the 32nd of his career.

=== Doubles ===
(United States) Rick Leach / (United States) Scott Melville defeated (India) Leander Paes / (Venezuela) Nicolás Pereira 7–6, 6–4

- It was Leach's only title of the year and the 29th of his career. It was Melville's only title of the year and the 7th of his career.
