= Carl Chang (businessman) =

American entrepreneur

- Born: February 13, 1969 (age 57); Hoboken, New Jersey, U.S.
- Occupations: Entrepreneur, real estate investor, and business executive

Carl Chang (born February 13, 1969) is an American entrepreneur, real estate investor, business executive, and former tennis coach. He founded the pizza chain Pieology, and is active in real estate investment businesses. He is the older brother and former coach of tennis star Michael Chang.

== Early life and education ==
Chang was born in Hoboken, New Jersey on February 13, 1969. In 1979, their family moved to La Costa, California, so they could play tennis year round. He graduated from San Dieguito High School in Encinitas, California, in 1987. He attended the University of California, Berkeley and graduated in 1991.

== Career ==
=== Tennis career ===
As a junior tennis player, Chang was ranked in the top ten at his age group. He beat Pete Sampras at junior events. Following his graduation, Chang briefly joined the professional tennis tour. After playing in a few events as a singles player as well as a doubles partner of his younger brother Michael, he decided not to continue and instead became Michael's coach in 1991 – a role he filled until Michael's retirement from the tour in 2003. Carl Chang was named 'Coach of the Year' by Tennis magazine in 1996.

=== Real estate ===
In 2005, Chang and his family started Redwood Real Estate, a joint venture with Seattle-based investment firm Sienna Group. The company had a $500 million fund focusing on distressed housing.

In 2010, Chang founded Kairos Investment Management Co LLC, a private equity firm focused on real estate transactions. Chang serves as the company's CEO.

=== Pieology ===
In 2011, Chang along with partner James Markham, founded Pieology, a fast casual pizza chain restaurant originally based in Fullerton, California. In 2012, Markham left to start his own company, leaving Chang in charge of Pieology.

=== Other activities ===
Chang is also the chair of the board of directors of the Los Angeles branch of the Federal Reserve Bank of San Francisco.
