= Jeff Brown (tennis) =

American tennis coach

Biographical details
- Born: Gainesville, Florida

Playing career
- 1985–1988: Louisiana State University

Coaching career (HC unless noted)
- 1998–2017: LSU

Head coaching record
- Overall: 312–205 (.603)

Accomplishments and honors

Championships
- Southeastern Conference (1998, 1999)

Jeff Brown is the former head men's tennis coach at Louisiana State University. Brown succeeded Jerry Simmons in 1998 and had an overall record of 312–205 and 116–116 in the SEC in twenty seasons as head coach of the Tigers before retiring in 2017. His teams played in 9 consecutive NCAA Tournaments, reaching the semifinals in 1998 and 1999. His 1998 and 1999 teams were SEC regular season and tournament champions.
