= Volvo International =

Defunct men's tennis tournament in the United States

Defunct tennis tournament
- Tour: WCT Circuit (1972); Grand Prix circuit (1985–1989); ATP World Series (1990–1997); ATP International Series (1998–2001)
- Founded: 1972
- Abolished: 1998
- Editions: 27
- Location: Bretton Woods, New Hampshire, US (1972–1974); North Conway, New Hampshire, US (1975–1984); Stratton Mountain, Vermont, US (1985–1989); New Haven, Connecticut, US (1990–1998)
- Surface: Clay (1973–1984); Hard (1985–1998)

The Volvo International, also known as the Pilot Pen International, was a professional tennis tournament founded in 1972 as the Bretton Woods WCT it was played on clay courts to 1984 and on outdoor hard courts from 1985 to 1998. It was first held at the Mount Washington Resort in Bretton Woods, New Hampshire in the United States in 1973 after Rod Laver had run a successful summer camp there. The International was originally part of the Grand Prix tennis circuit until the formation of the ATP Tour in 1990, when it became part of the Championship Series until its dissolution.

The event moved to several American locations during its run, including Mount Cranmore in North Conway, New Hampshire, from 1975 to 1984, Stratton Mountain Resort at Stratton Mountain, Vermont, from 1985 to 1989, and eventually to New Haven, Connecticut from 1990 until 1998, before it was discontinued.

In 2005, the ATP event at Long Island (known as the TD Waterhouse Cup) was moved to New Haven, where it merged with the WTA Tour's Pilot Pen Tennis. The current ATP Pilot Pen event is considered to be a continuation of the Long Island event rather than of the International.

== Finals ==
=== Singles ===
Location	Year	Champions	Runners-up	Score
Bretton Woods	1972	(United States) Cliff Richey	(United States) Jeff Borowiak	6–1, 6–0
Bretton Woods	1973	(India) Vijay Amritraj	(United States) Jimmy Connors	7–5, 2–6, 7–5
Bretton Woods	1974	(Australia) Rod Laver	(United States) Harold Solomon	6–4, 6–3
North Conway	1975	(United States) Jimmy Connors	(Australia) Ken Rosewall	6–2, 6–2
North Conway	1976	(United States) Jimmy Connors	(Mexico) Raúl Ramírez	7–6, 4–6, 6–3
North Conway	1977	(Australia) John Alexander	(Spain) Manuel Orantes	2–6, 6–4, 6–4
North Conway	1978	(United States) Eddie Dibbs	(Australia) John Alexander	6–4, 6–4
North Conway	1979	(United States) Harold Solomon	(Spain) José Higueras	5–7, 6–4, 7–6
North Conway	1980	(United States) Jimmy Connors	(United States) Eddie Dibbs	6–3, 5–7, 6–1
North Conway	1981	(Argentina) José Luis Clerc	(Argentina) Guillermo Vilas	6–3, 6–2
North Conway	1982	(Czechoslovakia) Ivan Lendl	(Spain) José Higueras	6–3, 6–2
North Conway	1983	(Argentina) José Luis Clerc	(Ecuador) Andrés Gómez	6–3, 6–1
North Conway	1984	(Sweden) Joakim Nyström	(United States) Tim Wilkison	6–2, 7–5
Stratton Mountain	1985	(United States) John McEnroe	(Czechoslovakia) Ivan Lendl	7–6^{(7–4)}, 6–2
Stratton Mountain	1986	(Czechoslovakia) Ivan Lendl	(West Germany) Boris Becker	6–4, 7–6
Stratton Mountain	1987	No winner	(Czechoslovakia) Ivan Lendl & (United States) John McEnroe	6–7, 4–1 unfinished (rain)
Stratton Mountain	1988	(United States) Andre Agassi	(United States) Paul Annacone	6–2, 6–4
Stratton Mountain	1989	(United States) Brad Gilbert	(United States) Jim Pugh	7–5, 6–0
New Haven	1990	(United States) Derrick Rostagno	(Australia) Todd Woodbridge	6–3, 6–3
New Haven	1991	(Czechoslovakia) Petr Korda	(Croatia) Goran Ivanišević	6–4, 6–2
New Haven	1992	(Sweden) Stefan Edberg	(United States) MaliVai Washington	7–6^{(7–4)}, 6–1
New Haven	1993	(Ukraine) Andrei Medvedev	(Czech Republic) Petr Korda	7–5, 6–4
New Haven	1994	(Germany) Boris Becker	(Switzerland) Marc Rosset	6–3, 7–5
New Haven	1995	(United States) Andre Agassi	(Netherlands) Richard Krajicek	3–6, 7–6^{(7–2)}, 6–3
New Haven	1996	(United States) Alex O'Brien	(Netherlands) Jan Siemerink	7–6^{(8–6)}, 6–4
New Haven	1997	(Russia) Yevgeny Kafelnikov	(Australia) Patrick Rafter	7–6^{(7–4)}, 6–4
New Haven	1998	(Slovakia) Karol Kučera	(Croatia) Goran Ivanišević	6–4, 5–7, 6–2

=== Doubles ===
Location	Year	Champions	Runners-up	Score
Bretton Woods	1973	(Australia) Rod Laver (Australia) Fred Stolle	(Australia) Bob Carmichael (South Africa) Frew McMillan	7–6, 4–6, 7–5
Bretton Woods	1974	(Australia) Rod Laver (United States) Jeff Borowiak	(Argentina) Ricardo Cano (Paraguay) Víctor Pecci	6–3, 6–0
North Conway	1975	(Pakistan) Haroon Rahim (United States) Erik van Dillen	(Australia) John Alexander (Australia) Phil Dent	7–6, 7–6
North Conway	1976	(United States) Brian Gottfried (Mexico) Raúl Ramírez	(Argentina) Ricardo Cano (Paraguay) Víctor Pecci	6–3, 6–0
North Conway	1977	(United States) Brian Gottfried (Mexico) Raúl Ramírez	(United States) Fred McNair (United States) Sherwood Stewart	7–5, 6–3
North Conway	1978	(United Kingdom) Robin Drysdale (United States) Van Winitsky	(United States) Mike Fishbach (South Africa) Bernard Mitton	4–6, 7–6, 6–3
North Conway	1979	(Romania) Ion Țiriac (Argentina) Guillermo Vilas	(United States) John Sadri (United States) Tim Wilkison	6–4, 7–6
North Conway	1980	(United States) Jimmy Connors (United States) Brian Gottfried	(South Africa) Kevin Curren (United States) Steve Denton	7–6, 6–2
North Conway	1981	(Switzerland) Heinz Günthardt (Australia) Peter McNamara	(Czechoslovakia) Pavel Složil (United States) Ferdi Taygan	6–7, 7–5, 6–4
North Conway	1982	(United States) Sherwood Stewart (United States) Ferdi Taygan	(Peru) Pablo Arraya (United States) Eric Fromm	6–2, 7–6
North Conway	1983	(Australia) Mark Edmondson (United States) Sherwood Stewart	(United States) Eric Fromm (United States) Drew Gitlin	7–6, 6–1
North Conway	1984	(United States) Brian Gottfried (Czechoslovakia) Tomáš Šmíd	(Brazil) Cássio Motta (United States) Blaine Willenborg	6–4, 6–2
Stratton Mountain	1985	(United States) Scott Davis (United States) David Pate	(United States) Ken Flach (United States) Robert Seguso	3–6, 7–6, 7–6
Stratton Mountain	1986	(United States) Peter Fleming (United States) John McEnroe	(United States) Paul Annacone (South Africa) Christo van Rensburg	6–3, 3–6, 6–3
Stratton Mountain	1987	No winner	(United States) Paul Annacone (South Africa) Christo van Rensburg vs. (United States) Ken Flach (United States) Robert Seguso	not played (rain)
Stratton Mountain	1988	(Mexico) Jorge Lozano (United States) Todd Witsken	(South Africa) Pieter Aldrich (South Africa) Danie Visser	6–3, 7–6
Stratton Mountain	1989	(Australia) Mark Kratzmann (Australia) Wally Masur	(South Africa) Pieter Aldrich (South Africa) Danie Visser	6–3, 4–6, 7–6
New Haven	1990	(United States) Jeff Brown (United States) Scott Melville	(Socialist Federal Republic of Yugoslavia) Goran Ivanišević (Czechoslovakia) Petr Korda	2–6, 7–5, 6–0
New Haven	1991	(Czechoslovakia) Petr Korda (Australia) Wally Masur	(United States) Jeff Brown (United States) Scott Melville	7–5, 6–3
New Haven	1992	(United States) Kelly Jones (United States) Rick Leach	(United States) Patrick McEnroe (United States) Jared Palmer	7–6, 6–7, 6–2
New Haven	1993	(Czech Republic) Cyril Suk (Czech Republic) Daniel Vacek	(United States) Steve DeVries (Australia) David Macpherson	6–3, 7–6
New Haven	1994	(Canada) Grant Connell (United States) Patrick Galbraith	(Netherlands) Jacco Eltingh (Netherlands) Paul Haarhuis	6–4, 7–6
New Haven	1995	(United States) Rick Leach (United States) Scott Melville	(India) Leander Paes (Venezuela) Nicolás Pereira	7–6, 6–4
New Haven	1996	(Zimbabwe) Byron Black (Canada) Grant Connell	(Sweden) Jonas Björkman (Sweden) Nicklas Kulti	6–4, 6–4
New Haven	1997	(India) Mahesh Bhupathi (India) Leander Paes	(Canada) Sébastien Lareau (United States) Alex O'Brien	6–4, 6–7, 6–2
New Haven	1998	(Australia) Wayne Arthurs (Australia) Peter Tramacchi	(Canada) Sébastien Lareau (United States) Alex O'Brien	7–6, 1–6, 6–3
