= 1993 Rosmalen Grass Court Championships – Singles =

Singles
- 1993 Rosmalen Grass Court Championships

Final
- Champion: (France) Arnaud Boetsch
- Runner-up: (Australia) Wally Masur
- Score: 3–6, 6–3, 6–3

Details
- Draw: 32 (3WC/4Q)
- Seeds: 8

Events
Singles	Doubles
← 1992 ·	Rosmalen Grass Court Championships	· 1994 →

Michael Stich was the defending champion, but chose to compete at Queen's in the same week.

Arnaud Boetsch won the title by defeating Wally Masur 3–6, 6–3, 6–3 in the final.

== Seeds ==
1. (Ukraine) Andrei Medvedev (second round)
2. (Netherlands) Richard Krajicek (quarterfinals)
3. (United States) MaliVai Washington (semifinals)
4. (Sweden) Henrik Holm (quarterfinals)
5. (Russia) Alexander Volkov (semifinals)
6. (France) Cédric Pioline (quarterfinals)
7. (Australia) Wally Masur (final)
8. (France) Arnaud Boetsch (champion)

== Draw ==
Key

- Q = Qualifier
- WC = Wild card
- LL = Lucky loser
- Alt = Alternate
- ITF = ITF entry
- PR = Protected ranking
- SR = Special ranking
- SE = Special exempt
- JE = Junior exempt
- JR = Junior Accelerator Programme entrant
- CO = College Accelerator Programme entrant
- NG = Next Gen Accelerator Program entrant
- w/o = Walkover
- r = Retired
- d = Defaulted

=== Finals ===
Semifinals
8	(France) Arnaud Boetsch	6	6
5	(Russia) Alexander Volkov	3	3
3	(United States) MaliVai Washington	5	6^{5}
7	(Australia) Wally Masur	7	7^{7}

Final
8	(France) Arnaud Boetsch	3	6	6
7	(Australia) Wally Masur	6	3	3

=== Top half ===
First round
1	(Ukraine) A Medvedev	6	6
WC	(Netherlands) F Wibier	4	4
(United States) B Shelton	6^{5}	6^{4}
(Italy) G Pozzi	7^{7}	7^{7}
(Netherlands) J Siemerink	6	6
(United States) R Weiss	2	2
Q	(United States) L Gloria	2	3
8	(France) A Boetsch	6	6
4	(Sweden) H Holm	6	6
(Germany) P Baur	4	3
(United States) D Rostagno	6	6^{3}	6
(Russia) A Chesnokov	0	7^{7}	4
(Russia) A Olhovskiy	6	6
(Denmark) K Carlsen	3	4
(United States) J Stark	2	3
5	(Russia) A Volkov	6	6

Second round
1	(Ukraine) A Medvedev	3	6^{5}
(Italy) G Pozzi	6	7^{7}
(Netherlands) J Siemerink	3	6^{5}
8	(France) A Boetsch	6	7^{7}
4	(Sweden) H Holm	6	6
(United States) D Rostagno	3	2
(Russia) A Olhovskiy	6	3	4
5	(Russia) A Volkov	4	6	6

Quarterfinals
(Italy) G Pozzi	2	4
8	(France) A Boetsch	6	6
4	(Sweden) H Holm	4	7^{7}	4
5	(Russia) A Volkov	6	6^{4}	6

Semifinals
8	(France) A Boetsch	6	6
5	(Russia) A Volkov	3	3

=== Bottom half ===
First round
6	(France) C Pioline	6	6
Q	(Germany) P Moraing	4	2
Q	(Australia) J Eagle	7^{7}	6
(Netherlands) P Haarhuis	6^{0}	2
WC	(Netherlands) D van Scheppingen	4	4
(Czech Republic) D Vacek	6	6
(Netherlands) J Eltingh	4	5
3	(United States) MV Washington	6	7
7	(Australia) W Masur	6	6
(Canada) A Sznajder	3	4
WC	(Netherlands) M Schapers	1	7	6^{4}
Q	(Australia) P Kilderry	6	5	7^{7}
(Germany) C Arriens	3	4
(United States) P McEnroe	6	6
(Germany) C Saceanu	6^{4}	1
2	(Netherlands) R Krajicek	7^{7}	6

Second round
6	(France) C Pioline	6	6^{5}	6
Q	(Australia) J Eagle	4	7^{7}	3
(Czech Republic) D Vacek	6^{7}	6	3
3	(United States) MV Washington	7^{9}	3	6
7	(Australia) W Masur	6	6
Q	(Australia) P Kilderry	3	2
(United States) P McEnroe	4	4
2	(Netherlands) R Krajicek	6	6

Quarterfinals
6	(France) C Pioline	4	4
3	(United States) MV Washington	6	6
7	(Australia) W Masur	6	7^{16}
2	(Netherlands) R Krajicek	3	6^{14}

Semifinals
3	(United States) MV Washington	5	6^{5}
7	(Australia) W Masur	7	7^{7}
