= 1991 Volvo Tennis Indoor – Doubles =

Doubles
- 1991 Volvo Tennis Indoor

Final
- Champions: (Germany) Udo Riglewski (Germany) Michael Stich
- Runners-up: (Australia) John Fitzgerald (Australia) Laurie Warder
- Score: 7–5, 6–3

Details
- Draw: 24 (2WC/1Q)
- Seeds: 8

Events
Singles	Doubles
← 1990 ·	U.S. National Indoor Championships	· 1992 →

Darren Cahill and Mark Kratzmann were the defending champions, but lost in the second round to Ken Flach and Sven Salumaa.

Udo Riglewski and Michael Stich won the title by defeating John Fitzgerald and Laurie Warder 7–5, 6–3 in the final.

== Seeds ==
All seeds receive a bye into the second round.

1. (United States) Scott Davis / (United States) David Pate (second round)
2. (United States) Rick Leach / (United States) Jim Pugh (quarterfinals)
3. (South Africa) Pieter Aldrich / (South Africa) Danie Visser (quarterfinals)
4. (Australia) Darren Cahill / (Australia) Mark Kratzmann (second round)
5. (Canada) Grant Connell / (Canada) Glenn Michibata (second round)
6. (United States) Jim Grabb / (United States) Patrick McEnroe (semifinals)
7. (United Kingdom) Neil Broad / (United States) Kevin Curren (semifinals)
8. (Germany) Udo Riglewski / (Germany) Michael Stich (champions)

== Draw ==
=== Key ===
- Q = Qualifier
- WC = Wild card
- LL = Lucky loser
- Alt = Alternate
- ITF = ITF entry
- PR = Protected ranking
- SR = Special ranking
- SE = Special exempt
- JE = Junior exempt
- JR = Junior Accelerator Programme entrant
- CO = College Accelerator Programme entrant
- NG = Next Gen Accelerator Program entrant
- w/o = Walkover
- r = Retired
- d = Defaulted

=== Finals ===
Semifinals
7	(United Kingdom) Neil Broad (United States) Kevin Curren	4	3
(Australia) John Fitzgerald (Australia) Laurie Warder	6	6
6	(United States) Jim Grabb (United States) Patrick McEnroe	6	2
8	(Germany) Udo Riglewski (Germany) Michael Stich	7	6

Final
(Australia) John Fitzgerald (Australia) Laurie Warder	5	3
8	(Germany) Udo Riglewski (Germany) Michael Stich	7	6

=== Top half ===
First round
(South Africa) G Muller (United States) R Seguso	4	6
Q	(South Africa) W Ferreira (South Africa) P Norval	6	7
(Australia) B Dyke (Sweden) P Lundgren	6	2
(Spain) T Carbonell (Brazil) L Mattar	7	6
(United States) K Flach (United States) S Salumaa	5	6	7
WC	(United States) B Garnett (United States) R Schmidt	7	4	6
(Australia) J Fitzgerald (Australia) L Warder	6	7
WC	(Italy) C Caratti (United States) MV Washington	1	5

Second round
1	(United States) S Davis (United States) D Pate	3	4
Q	(South Africa) W Ferreira (South Africa) P Norval	6	6
(Spain) T Carbonell (Brazil) L Mattar	4	4
7	(United Kingdom) N Broad (United States) K Curren	6	6
4	(Australia) D Cahill (Australia) M Kratzmann	3	3
(United States) K Flach (United States) S Salumaa	6	6
(Australia) J Fitzgerald (Australia) L Warder	7	6
5	(Canada) G Connell (Canada) G Michibata	6	4

Quarterfinals
Q	(South Africa) W Ferreira (South Africa) P Norval	5	4
7	(United Kingdom) N Broad (United States) K Curren	7	6
(United States) K Flach (United States) S Salumaa	5	4
(Australia) J Fitzgerald (Australia) L Warder	7	6

Semifinals
7	(United Kingdom) N Broad (United States) K Curren	4	3
(Australia) J Fitzgerald (Australia) L Warder	6	6

=== Bottom half ===
First round
(United States) J Courier (Venezuela) N Pereira	6	6	6
(United States) B Garrow (United States) B Pearce	4	7	1
(United States) J Brown (United States) S Melville	3	6	7
(Ecuador) A Gómez (Brazil) C Motta	6	4	6
(Czechoslovakia) P Korda (Czechoslovakia) C Suk	3	5
(South Africa) S Kruger (South Africa) C van Rensburg	6	7
(Netherlands) P Haarhuis (Netherlands) M Koevermans	7	7
(Australia) W Masur (Australia) J Stoltenberg	6	6

Second round
6	(United States) J Grabb (United States) P McEnroe	6	6
(United States) J Courier (Venezuela) N Pereira	2	4
(United States) J Brown (United States) S Melville	5	3
3	(South Africa) P Aldrich (South Africa) D Visser	7	6
8	(Germany) U Riglewski (Germany) M Stich	6	6	6
(South Africa) S Kruger (South Africa) C van Rensburg	2	7	3
(Netherlands) P Haarhuis (Netherlands) M Koevermans	6	1
2	(United States) R Leach (United States) J Pugh	7	6

Quarterfinals
6	(United States) J Grabb (United States) P McEnroe	6	7	7
3	(South Africa) P Aldrich (South Africa) D Visser	7	5	6
8	(Germany) U Riglewski (Germany) M Stich	6	6
2	(United States) R Leach (United States) J Pugh	3	4

Semifinals
6	(United States) J Grabb (United States) P McEnroe	6	2
8	(Germany) U Riglewski (Germany) M Stich	7	6
