= 1993 Rosmalen Grass Court Championships – Doubles =

Doubles
- 1993 Rosmalen Grass Court Championships

Final
- Champions: (United States) Patrick McEnroe (United States) Jonathan Stark
- Runners-up: (South Africa) David Adams (Russia) Andrei Olhovskiy
- Score: 7–6, 1–6, 6–4

Events
| Singles | Doubles |
| ← 1992 · | Rosmalen Grass Court Championships | · 1994 → |

Jim Grabb and Richey Reneberg were the defending champions, but none competed this year. Reneberg competed at Queen's in the same week.

Patrick McEnroe and Jonathan Stark won the title by defeating David Adams and Andrei Olhovskiy 7–6, 1–6, 6–4 in the final.

== Seeds ==
1. (Australia) Mark Kratzmann / (Australia) Wally Masur (first round)
2. (Netherlands) Jacco Eltingh / (Netherlands) Paul Haarhuis (first round)
3. (United States) Patrick McEnroe / (United States) Jonathan Stark (champions)
4. (South Africa) David Adams / (Russia) Andrei Olhovskiy (final)

== Draw ==
=== Key ===
- Q = Qualifier
- WC = Wild card
- LL = Lucky loser
- Alt = Alternate
- SE = Special exempt
- PR = Protected ranking
- ITF = ITF entry
- JE = Junior exempt
- w/o = Walkover
- r = Retired
- d = Defaulted
- SR = Special ranking

=== Draw ===
First round
1 | (Australia) M Kratzmann (Australia) W Masur | 5 | 3
(Netherlands) T Nijssen (Czech Republic) C Suk | 7 | 6
(Netherlands) T Kempers (Netherlands) M Oosting | 6 | 6 | 5
(Sweden) H Holm (Sweden) P Nyborg | 7 | 3 | 7
4 | (South Africa) D Adams (Russia) A Olhovskiy | 6 | 6
WC | (Ukraine) O Dolgopolov Sr. (Ukraine) A Medvedev | 1 | 4
WC | (Denmark) K Carlsen (United States) MV Washington | 6 | 7
(United States) M Bauer (United States) T Nelson | 3 | 5
Q | (Netherlands) S Groen (Germany) A Thoms | 7 | 7
(Venezuela) M Ruah (Cuba) M Tabares | 6 | 6
(United States) K Kinnear (Germany) C Saceanu | 2 | 6 | 3
3 | (United States) P McEnroe (United States) J Stark | 6 | 4 | 6
(Denmark) M Mortensen (Sweden) T Svantesson | 7 | 6 | 6
(Netherlands) R Krajicek (Netherlands) J Siemerink | 6 | 7 | 7
(United States) TJ Middleton (United States) B Shelton | 1 | 7 | 6
2 | (Netherlands) J Eltingh (Netherlands) P Haarhuis | 6 | 6 | 2

Quarterfinals
(Netherlands) T Nijssen (Czech Republic) C Suk | 3 | 6 | 6
(Sweden) H Holm (Sweden) P Nyborg | 6 | 3 | 1
4 | (South Africa) D Adams (Russia) A Olhovskiy | 6 | 6
WC | (Denmark) K Carlsen (United States) MV Washington | 4 | 4
Q | (Netherlands) S Groen (Germany) A Thoms | 3 | 4
3 | (United States) P McEnroe (United States) J Stark | 6 | 6
(Netherlands) R Krajicek (Netherlands) J Siemerink | 6 | 7
(United States) TJ Middleton (United States) B Shelton | 3 | 6

Semifinals
(Netherlands) T Nijssen (Czech Republic) C Suk | 1 | 6
4 | (South Africa) D Adams (Russia) A Olhovskiy | 6 | 7
3 | (United States) P McEnroe (United States) J Stark | 7 | 7
(Netherlands) R Krajicek (Netherlands) J Siemerink | 5 | 6

Final
4 | (South Africa) D Adams (Russia) A Olhovskiy | 6 | 6 | 4
3 | (United States) P McEnroe (United States) J Stark | 7 | 1 | 6
