= 1992 Federal Express International – Singles =

Singles
- 1992 Federal Express International

Final
- Champion: (United States) MaliVai Washington
- Runner-up: (South Africa) Wayne Ferreira
- Score: 6–3, 6–2

Details
- Draw: 48
- Seeds: 16

Events
Singles	Doubles
← 1991 ·	U.S. National Indoor Championships	· 1993 →

Ivan Lendl was the defending champion but did not play in the tournament.

== Seeds ==
1. (Germany) Michael Stich (third round)
2. (United States) Pete Sampras (quarterfinals)
3. (United States) Michael Chang (third round)
4. (United States) David Wheaton (third round)
5. (United States) Brad Gilbert (third round)
6. (United States) Derrick Rostagno (second round)
7. (South Africa) Wayne Ferreira (finalist)
8. (Commonwealth of Independent States) Andrei Chesnokov (second round)
9. (United States) Aaron Krickstein (quarterfinals)
10. (United States) Richey Reneberg (third round)
11. (Austria) Horst Skoff (second round)
12. (Spain) Francisco Clavet (second round)
13. (United States) MaliVai Washington (champion)
14. (Netherlands) Paul Haarhuis (quarterfinals)
15. (Italy) Cristiano Caratti (second round)
16. (United States) Jimmy Connors (semifinals)

== Draw ==
=== Key ===
- Q = Qualifier
- WC = Wild card
- LL = Lucky loser
- Alt = Alternate
- ITF = ITF entry
- PR = Protected ranking
- SR = Special ranking
- SE = Special exempt
- JE = Junior exempt
- JR = Junior Accelerator Programme entrant
- CO = College Accelerator Programme entrant
- NG = Next Gen Accelerator Program entrant
- w/o = Walkover
- r = Retired
- d = Defaulted

=== Finals ===
Semifinals
16	(United States) Jimmy Connors	2	5
13	(United States) MaliVai Washington	6	7
(Israel) Amos Mansdorf	2	3
7	(South Africa) Wayne Ferreira	6	6

Final
13	(United States) MaliVai Washington	6	6
7	(South Africa) Wayne Ferreira	3	2

=== Top half ===
==== Section 1 ====
First round
Q	(Australia) M Woodforde	6^{3}	7	3
LL	(United States) T Martin	7^{7}	5	6
WC	(Australia) P Doohan	2	4
(United States) K Curren	6	6
(Haiti) R Agenor	6	6^{8}	6^{3}
Q	(United States) T Witsken	2	7^{10}	7^{7}
(Australia) T Woodbridge	7^{7}	7^{9}
Q	(United States) C Adams	6^{4}	6^{7}

Second round
1	(Germany) M Stich	6	6
LL	(United States) T Martin	2	2
(United States) K Curren	2	2
16	(United States) J Connors	6	6
9	(United States) A Krickstein	7^{8}	6
Q	(United States) T Witsken	6^{6}	4
(Australia) T Woodbridge	6	7^{7}
8	(Commonwealth of Independent States) A Chesnokov	4	6^{4}

Third round
1	(Germany) M Stich	7	6^{5}	5
16	(United States) J Connors	5	7^{7}	7
9	(United States) A Krickstein	6	6
(Australia) T Woodbridge	2	2

Quarterfinals
16	(United States) J Connors	3	6	6
9	(United States) A Krickstein	6	2	3

==== Section 2 ====
First round
(Germany) P Baur	2	7^{7}	6
(Italy) R Furlan	6	6^{4}	4
(United States) B Shelton	6	6^{5}	7^{7}
(Germany) P Kuhnen	4	7^{7}	6^{1}
(Argentina) G Markus	3	2
(Australia) J Stoltenberg	6	6
(Netherlands) M Schapers	6	6^{5}	6
(Germany) C Saceanu	3	7^{7}	3

Second round
3	(United States) M Chang	6	6
(Germany) P Baur	3	3
(United States) B Shelton	0	3
13	(United States) M Washington	6	6
11	(Austria) H Skoff	5	3
(Australia) J Stoltenberg	7	6
(Netherlands) M Schapers	6	4	6
6	(United States) D Rostagno	3	6	3

Third round
3	(United States) M Chang	5	6^{2}
13	(United States) M Washington	7	7^{7}
(Australia) J Stoltenberg	1	2
(Netherlands) M Schapers	6	6

Quarterfinals
13	(United States) M Washington	6	7
(Netherlands) M Schapers	3	5

=== Bottom half ===
==== Section 3 ====
First round
WC	(United States) P Annacone	6	6^{6}	4
(Sweden) N Kulti	4	7^{8}	6
Q	(France) R Gilbert	4	2
(Israel) A Mansdorf	6	6
(South Africa) C van Rensburg	6	6
(Netherlands) M Koevermans	2	1
LL	(Australia) S Stolle	6	6
WC	(United States) J Kriek	3	4

Second round
5	(United States) B Gilbert	7^{7}	6
(Sweden) N Kulti	6^{2}	3
(Israel) A Mansdorf	6	6
12	(Spain) F Clavet	4	3
14	(Netherlands) P Haarhuis	6	6
(South Africa) C van Rensburg	4	4
LL	(Australia) S Stolle	6^{7}	3
4	(United States) D Wheaton	7^{9}	6

Third round
5	(United States) B Gilbert	6^{2}	6^{1}
(Israel) A Mansdorf	7^{7}	7^{7}
14	(Netherlands) P Haarhuis	4	7^{7}	7
4	(United States) D Wheaton	6	6^{3}	5

Quarterfinals
(Israel) A Mansdorf	7^{7}	6
4	(Netherlands) P Haarhuis	6^{5}	3

==== Section 4 ====
First round
(Japan) S Matsuoka	6	1	6^{4}
(Australia) W Masur	4	6	7^{7}
(United States) J Arias	2	7	3
(Italy) G Pozzi	6	5	6
(Canada) G Connell	4	6	7
(Sweden) L Jönsson	6	3	5
Q	(Australia) R Fromberg	6	7
Q	(Germany) K Braasch	3	5

Second round
7	(South Africa) W Ferreira	6	6
(Australia) W Masur	4	4
(Italy) G Pozzi	2	5
10	(United States) R Reneberg	6	7
15	(Italy) C Caratti	6^{4}	6^{6}
(Canada) G Connell	7^{7}	7^{8}
Q	(Australia) R Fromberg	4	5
2	(United States) P Sampras	6	7

Third round
7	(South Africa) W Ferreira	6	4	6
10	(United States) R Reneberg	2	6	4
(Canada) G Connell	6^{4}	1
2	(United States) P Sampras	7^{7}	6

Quarterfinals
7	(South Africa) W Ferreira	6	6
2	(United States) P Sampras	4	2
