= 1990 Volvo U.S. National Indoor – Singles =

Singles
- 1990 Volvo U.S. National Indoor

Final
- Champion: (West Germany) Michael Stich
- Runner-up: (Australia) Wally Masur
- Score: 6–7^{(5–7)}, 6–4, 7–6^{(7–1)}

Details
- Draw: 48
- Seeds: 16

Events
Singles	Doubles
← 1989 ·	Volvo U.S. National Indoor	· 1991 →

Brad Gilbert was the defending champion, but did not take part in the U.S. National Indoor tennis tournament that year.
Michael Stich clinched his first career singles title in the final, defeating Wally Masur 6–7^{(5–7)}, 6–4, 7–6^{(7–1)}.

== Seeds ==
All seeds receive a bye into the second round.

1. (Sweden) Stefan Edberg (second round)
2. (United States) Michael Chang (second round)
3. (Soviet Union) Andrei Chesnokov (third round)
4. (United States) Kevin Curren (third round)
5. (South Africa) Christo van Rensburg (second round)
6. (Australia) Wally Masur (final)
7. (Uruguay) Marcelo Filippini (third round)
8. (Sweden) Mikael Pernfors (second round)
9. (United States) Paul Annacone (second round)
10. (United States) Paul Chamberlin (third round)
11. (France) Jean-Philippe Fleurian (third round)
12. (United States) Richey Reneberg (third round)
13. (Czechoslovakia) Petr Korda (quarterfinals)
14. (New Zealand) Kelly Evernden (second round)
15. (United States) Jimmy Arias (third round)
16. (Australia) Darren Cahill (third round)

== Draw ==
=== Key ===
- Q = Qualifier
- WC = Wild card
- LL = Lucky loser
- Alt = Alternate
- SE = Special exempt
- PR = Protected ranking
- ITF = ITF entry
- JE = Junior exempt
- w/o = Walkover
- r = Retired
- d = Defaulted
- SR = Special ranking

=== Finals ===
Quarterfinals
(South Africa) Gary Muller	7	7
Q	(South Africa) Danie Visser	5	5
(West Germany) Michael Stich	6	7^{7}
Q	(United States) MaliVai Washington	4	6^{5}
6	(Australia) Wally Masur	6	7
13	(Czechoslovakia) Petr Korda	4	5
(Finland) Veli Paloheimo	7	6^{3}	4
(United States) Glenn Layendecker	5	7^{7}	6

Semifinals
(South Africa) Gary Muller	5	6^{4}
(West Germany) Michael Stich	7	7^{7}
6	(Australia) Wally Masur	6	6
(United States) Glenn Layendecker	3	2

Final
(West Germany) Michael Stich	6^{5}	6	7^{7}
6	(Australia) Wally Masur	7^{7}	4	6^{1}

=== Top half ===
==== Section 1 ====
First round
(South Africa) P Aldrich	6^{5}	3
(South Africa) G Muller	7^{7}	6
(India) R Krishnan	6	6
(Brazil) C Motta	2	1
Q	(South Africa) D Visser	6	6
(Australia) M Kratzmann	4	3
WC	(India) V Amritraj	4^{r}
Q	(United States) B Page	1

Second round
1	(Sweden) S Edberg	1	5
(South Africa) G Muller	6	7
(India) R Krishnan	5	7^{7}	3
15	(United States) J Arias	7	6^{5}	6
9	(United States) P Annacone	5	7^{9}	4
Q	(South Africa) D Visser	7	6^{7}	6
(United States) B Page	3	6^{3}
7	(Uruguay) M Filippini	6	7^{7}

Third round
(South Africa) G Muller	4	7	6
15	(United States) J Arias	6	5	3
Q	(South Africa) D Visser	3	7^{7}	6
7	(Uruguay) M Filippini	6	6^{1}	4

Quarterfinals
(South Africa) G Muller	7	7
Q	(South Africa) D Visser	5	5

==== Section 2 ====
First round
Q	(United States) C Garner	2	2
Q	(The Bahamas) R Smith	6	6
(Canada) G Connell	6	6^{4}	4
(West Germany) M Stich	4	7^{7}	6
WC	(United States) K Flach	6	4	7^{7}
(Argentina) H de la Peña	4	6	6^{5}
Q	(United States) M Washington	3	6	6
(West Germany) P Kühnen	6	2	4

Second round
3	(Soviet Union) A Chesnokov	6	6
Q	(The Bahamas) R Smith	4	4
(West Germany) M Stich	6	6
14	(New Zealand) K Evernden	1	2
12	(United States) R Reneberg	6	6
WC	(United States) K Flach	3	2
Q	(United States) M Washington	6	6
5	(South Africa) C van Rensburg	4	4

Third round
3	(Soviet Union) A Chesnokov	3	1
(West Germany) M Stich	6	6
12	(United States) R Reneberg	6	6^{4}	3
Q	(United States) M Washington	4	7^{7}	6

Quarterfinals
(West Germany) M Stich	6	7^{7}
Q	(United States) M Washington	4	6^{5}

=== Bottom half ===
==== Section 3 ====
First round
(Uruguay) D Pérez	7	7^{7}
Q	(United States) B Shelton	5	6^{4}
(West Germany) U Riglewski	3	6	1
(Sweden) N Kroon	6	4	6
(Israel) G Bloom	7	6
(Canada) M Laurendeau	5	1
WC	(United States) K Evans	4	2
(United States) L Duncan	6	6

Second round
6	(Australia) W Masur	6	6
(Uruguay) D Pérez	2	3
(Sweden) N Kroon	3	6	3
11	(France) J-P Fleurian	6	4	6
13	(Czechoslovakia) P Korda	6	6
(Israel) G Bloom	1	4
(United States) L Duncan	4	2
4/WC	(United States) K Curren	6	6

Third round
6	(Australia) W Masur	6^{4}	6	7^{8}
11	(France) J-P Fleurian	7^{7}	1	6^{6}
13	(Czechoslovakia) P Korda	7^{8}	6
4/WC	(United States) K Curren	6^{6}	4

Quarterfinals
6	(Australia) W Masur	6	7
13	(Czechoslovakia) P Korda	4	5

==== Section 4 ====
First round
(Finland) V Paloheimo	7^{7}	7^{8}
(United States) D Rostagno	6^{3}	6^{6}
(United States) K Jones	6^{4}	3
(Socialist Federal Republic of Yugoslavia) B Orešar	7^{7}	6
(United States) T Wilkison	7	6
(United States) L Shiras	5	3
(United States) J Brown	2	6^{7}
(United States) G Layendecker	6	7^{9}

Second round
8	(Sweden) M Pernfors	6^{5}	3
(Finland) V Paloheimo	7^{7}	6
(Socialist Federal Republic of Yugoslavia) B Orešar	5	4
10/WC	(United States) P Chamberlin	7	6
16	(Australia) D Cahill	6^{6}	7^{7}	7
(United States) T Wilkison	7^{8}	6^{0}	5
(United States) G Layendecker	6	6
2	(United States) M Chang	4	4

Third round
(Finland) V Paloheimo	7	6
10/WC	(United States) P Chamberlin	5	1
16	(Australia) D Cahill	4	4
(United States) G Layendecker	6	6

Quarterfinals
(Finland) V Paloheimo	7	6^{3}	4
(United States) G Layendecker	5	7^{7}	6
