= 1992 Rosmalen Grass Court Championships =

- Date: 8–14 June
- Edition: 3rd
- Category: ATP World Series
- Draw: 32S / 16D
- Prize money: $235,000
- Surface: Grass / outdoor
- Location: Rosmalen, Netherlands

Champions

Singles
- (Germany) Michael Stich

Doubles
- (United States) Jim Grabb / (United States) Richey Reneberg
← 1991 ·	Rosmalen Grass Court Championships	· 1993 →

The 1992 Continental Grass Court Championships was a men's ATP-tennis tournament held in Rosmalen, Netherlands. It was played on outdoor grass courts and was part of the ATP World Series of the 1992 ATP Tour. It was the third edition of the tournament and was held from 8 June until 14 June 1992. First-seeded Michael Stich won the singles title.

== Finals ==
=== Singles ===
(Germany) Michael Stich defeated (United States) Jonathan Stark 6–4, 7–5

- It was Stich's 1st singles title of the year and the 6th of his career.

=== Doubles ===
(United States) Jim Grabb / (United States) Richey Reneberg defeated (United States) John McEnroe / (Germany) Michael Stich 6–4, 6–7, 6–4
