= 1992 Federal Express International – Doubles =

Doubles
- 1992 Federal Express International

Final
- Champion: (Australia) Mark Woodforde (Australia) Todd Woodbridge
- Runner-up: (United States) Kevin Curren (South Africa) Gary Muller
- Score: 7–5, 4–6, 7–6^{(7–5)}

Details
- Draw: 24
- Seeds: 8

Events
Singles	Doubles
- U.S. National Indoor Championships

The 1992 Federal Express International – Doubles was an event of the 1992 Federal Express International men's tennis tournament played on indoor hard courts at the Racquet Club of Memphis in Memphis, Tennessee in the United States from February 10 through February 16, 1992. The doubles draw consisted of 24 teams and eight of them were seeded and received a bye in the first round.

Byron Black and Jonathan Stark were the defending champions, but Black did not compete this year. Stark teamed up with Todd Martin and lost in the quarterfinals to Mark Knowles and Daniel Nestor.

The second-seeded team of Mark Woodforde and Todd Woodbridge won the doubles title by defeating the unseeded pairing Kevin Curren and Gary Muller 7–5, 4–6, 7–6^{(7–5)} in the final.

== Seeds ==
1. (United States) Ken Flach / (United States) Robert Seguso (second round)
2. (Australia) Mark Woodforde / (Australia) Todd Woodbridge (champions)
3. (United States) Scott Davis / (United States) David Pate (quarterfinals)
4. (Canada) Grant Connell / (Canada) Glenn Michibata (quarterfinals)
5. (United States) Kelly Jones / (United States) Rick Leach (semifinals)
6. (United States) Patrick Galbraith / (United States) Todd Witsken (semifinals)
7. (United States) Jim Grabb / (United States) Richey Reneberg (quarterfinals)
8. (Netherlands) Paul Haarhuis / (Netherlands) Mark Koevermans (second round)

== Draw ==
Key

- Q = Qualifier
- WC = Wild card
- LL = Lucky loser
- Alt = Alternate
- ITF = ITF entry
- PR = Protected ranking
- SR = Special ranking
- SE = Special exempt
- JE = Junior exempt
- JR = Junior Accelerator Programme entrant
- CO = College Accelerator Programme entrant
- NG = Next Gen Accelerator Program entrant
- w/o = Walkover
- r = Retired
- d = Defaulted

=== Finals ===
Semifinals
(United States) Kevin Curren (South Africa) Gary Muller	7	7
5	(United States) Kelly Jones (United States) Rick Leach	6	6
6	(United States) Patrick Galbraith (United States) Todd Witsken	4	7	2
2	(Australia) Mark Woodforde (Australia) Todd Woodbridge	6	5	6

Final
(United States) Kevin Curren (South Africa) Gary Muller	5	6	6
2	(Australia) Mark Woodforde (Australia) Todd Woodbridge	7	4	7

=== Top half ===
First Round
(United States) Kevin Curren (South Africa) Gary Muller	6	7
(Sweden) Peter Lundgren (Australia) Jason Stoltenberg	4	6
(United States) Bryan Shelton (United States) MaliVai Washington	7	6
(United States) Jim Pugh (United States) Derrick Rostagno	6	4
Q	(South Africa) Royce Deppe (United States) Dave Randall	6	3	6
(United States) Jared Palmer (United States) Jonathan Stark	4	6	2
(United States) Paul Annacone (South Africa) Christo van Rensburg	4	4
(United States) Glenn Layendecker (United States) Brad Pearce	6	6

Second Round
1	(United States) Ken Flach (United States) Robert Seguso	6	6
(United States) Kevin Curren (South Africa) Gary Muller	7	7
(United States) Bryan Shelton (United States) MaliVai Washington	7	6
8	(Netherlands) Paul Haarhuis (Netherlands) Mark Koevermans	6	2
3	(United States) Scott Davis (United States) David Pate	6	6	6
Q	(South Africa) Royce Deppe (United States) Dave Randall	4	7	3
(United States) Glenn Layendecker (United States) Brad Pearce	5	5
5	(United States) Kelly Jones (United States) Rick Leach	7	7

Quarterfinals
(United States) Kevin Curren (South Africa) Gary Muller	6	7	6
(United States) Bryan Shelton (United States) MaliVai Washington	7	5	2
3	(United States) Scott Davis (United States) David Pate	7	0	4
5	(United States) Kelly Jones (United States) Rick Leach	6	6	6

Semifinals
(United States) Kevin Curren (South Africa) Gary Muller	7	7
5	(United States) Kelly Jones (United States) Rick Leach	6	6

=== Bottom half ===
First Round
(South Africa) Byron Talbot (United States) Greg Van Emburgh	6	2
(United States) Bret Garnett (Sweden) Tobias Svantesson	7	6
(Germany) Michael Stich (United States) Pete Sampras	6	7
(Netherlands) Michiel Schapers (Czechoslovakia) Daniel Vacek	2	6
(United States) Kent Kinnear (United States) Sven Salumaa	6	2	6
(United States) Michael Chang (United States) Carl Chang	4	6	1
(Australia) Mark Kratzmann (Australia) Wally Masur	6	4
(South Africa) Pieter Aldrich (South Africa) Danie Visser	7	6

Second Round
6	(United States) Patrick Galbraith (United States) Todd Witsken	6	6	6
(United States) Bret Garnett (Sweden) Tobias Svantesson	4	7	3
(Germany) Michael Stich (United States) Pete Sampras	6	6	1
4	(Canada) Grant Connell (Canada) Glenn Michibata	7	3	6
7	(United States) Jim Grabb (United States) Richey Reneberg	7	6
(United States) Kent Kinnear (United States) Sven Salumaa	6	1
(South Africa) Pieter Aldrich (South Africa) Danie Visser	4	4
2	(Australia) Mark Woodforde (Australia) Todd Woodbridge	6	6

Quarterfinals
6	(United States) Patrick Galbraith (United States) Todd Witsken	6	6
4	(Canada) Grant Connell (Canada) Glenn Michibata	2	4
7	(United States) Jim Grabb (United States) Richey Reneberg	3	4
2	(Australia) Mark Woodforde (Australia) Todd Woodbridge	6	6

Semifinals
6	(United States) Patrick Galbraith (United States) Todd Witsken	4	7	2
2	(Australia) Mark Woodforde (Australia) Todd Woodbridge	6	5	6
