= 1991 Volvo Tennis Indoor =

- Date: February 18–24
- Edition: 21st
- Category: Championship Series
- Draw: 48S / 24D
- Prize money: $600,000
- Surface: Hard / indoor
- Location: Memphis, U.S.

Champions

Singles
- (United States) Ivan Lendl

Doubles
- (Germany) Udo Riglewski / (Germany) Michael Stich
- U.S. National Indoor Championships

The 1991 Volvo Tennis Indoor was a men's tennis tournament played on indoor hard courts that was part of the Championship Series of the 1991 ATP Tour. It was the 21st edition of the tournament and tt took place in Memphis, Tennessee, United States, from February 18 through February 24, 1991. First-seeded Ivan Lendl, who entered on a wildcard, won the singles title and earned $99,000 first-prize money.

== Finals ==
=== Singles ===
(United States) Ivan Lendl defeated (Germany) Michael Stich, 7–5, 6–3

- It was Lendl's 2nd singles title of the year and the 90th of his career.

=== Doubles ===
(Germany) Udo Riglewski / (Germany) Michael Stich defeated (Australia) John Fitzgerald / (Australia) Laurie Warder, 7–5, 6–3
