= 1992 Rosmalen Grass Court Championships – Singles =

Singles
- 1992 Rosmalen Grass Court Championships

Final
- Champion: (Germany) Michael Stich
- Runner-up: (United States) Jonathan Stark
- Score: 6–4, 7–5

Details
- Draw: 32 (3WC/4Q)
- Seeds: 8

Events
Singles	Doubles
← 1991 ·	Rosmalen Grass Court Championships	· 1993 →

Christian Saceanu was the defending champion, but lost in the second round to Richard Krajicek.

Michael Stich won the title by defeating Jonathan Stark 6–4, 7–5 in the final.

== Seeds ==
1. (Germany) Michael Stich (champion)
2. (Netherlands) Richard Krajicek (quarterfinals)
3. (Commonwealth of Independent States) Alexander Volkov (quarterfinals)
4. (Commonwealth of Independent States) Andrei Chesnokov (first round)
5. (United States) John McEnroe (semifinals)
6. (Netherlands) Jan Siemerink (second round)
7. (Germany) Markus Zoecke (second round)
8. (Netherlands) Michiel Schapers (semifinals)

== Draw ==
=== Key ===
- Q = Qualifier
- WC = Wild card
- LL = Lucky loser
- Alt = Alternate
- SE = Special exempt
- PR = Protected ranking
- ITF = ITF entry
- JE = Junior exempt
- w/o = Walkover
- r = Retired
- d = Defaulted
- SR = Special ranking

=== Finals ===
Semifinals
1	(Germany) Michael Stich	6	7^{7}
5	(United States) John McEnroe	3	6^{3}
(United States) Jonathan Stark	6	7^{7}
8	(Netherlands) Michiel Schapers	4	6^{4}

Final
1	(Germany) Michael Stich	6	7
(United States) Jonathan Stark	4	5

=== Top half ===
First round
1	(Germany) M Stich	6	6
(Australia) C Limberger	3	4
(Germany) P Baur	5	4
WC	(Netherlands) F Wibier	7	6
(Canada) M Laurendeau	6^{1}	4
(United States) R Reneberg	7^{7}	6
(Netherlands) J Eltingh	6	6^{3}	6^{3}
7	(Germany) M Zoecke	3	7^{7}	7^{7}
3	(Commonwealth of Independent States) A Volkov	6	7^{8}
(Germany) M Naewie	1	6^{6}
Q	(United States) K Kinnear	6	6^{0}	6
WC	(Netherlands) D van Scheppingen	4	7^{7}	4
Q	(Czechoslovakia) C Suk	3	2
(United States) J Grabb	6	6
(Sweden) P Lundgren	2	3
5	(United States) J McEnroe	6	6

Second round
1	(Germany) M Stich	6	6
WC	(Netherlands) F Wibier	4	4
(United States) R Reneberg	6	6
7	(Germany) M Zoecke	4	2
3	(Commonwealth of Independent States) A Volkov	6	6
Q	(United States) K Kinnear	3	4
(United States) J Grabb	2	6^{7}
5	(United States) J McEnroe	6	7^{9}

Quarterfinals
1	(Germany) M Stich	6	6
(United States) R Reneberg	2	3
3	(Commonwealth of Independent States) A Volkov	4	3
5	(United States) J McEnroe	6	6

Semifinals
1	(Germany) M Stich	6	7^{7}
5	(United States) J McEnroe	3	6^{3}

=== Bottom half ===
First round
6	(Netherlands) J Siemerink	7	6
(United States) B Shelton	5	1
Q	(Netherlands) HJ Davids	3	4
(Sweden) H Holm	6	6
(United States) J Stark	6	6
(United States) C Adams	3	3
(Israel) G Bloom	6	7^{7}
4	(Commonwealth of Independent States) A Chesnokov	4	6^{6}
8	(Netherlands) M Schapers	7	7^{7}
Q	(Sweden) P Nyborg	5	6^{5}
(Australia) S Youl	6	6
(South Africa) M Ondruska	3	2
(Germany) C Saceanu	6	6^{5}	7^{7}
WC	(Netherlands) T Nijssen	3	7^{7}	6^{5}
(Commonwealth of Independent States) A Olhovskiy	4	7^{7}	4
2	(Netherlands) R Krajicek	6	6^{1}	6

Second round
6	(Netherlands) J Siemerink	4	3
(Sweden) H Holm	6	6
(United States) J Stark	6	6^{10}	7
(Israel) G Bloom	3	7^{12}	5
8	(Netherlands) M Schapers	3	6	6
(Australia) S Youl	6	3	3
(Germany) C Saceanu	3	4
2	(Netherlands) R Krajicek	6	6

Quarterfinals
(Sweden) H Holm	6^{5}	6	3
(United States) J Stark	7^{7}	3	6
8	(Netherlands) M Schapers	6	6
2	(Netherlands) R Krajicek	4	2

Semifinals
(United States) J Stark	6	7^{7}
8	(Netherlands) M Schapers	4	6^{4}
