= 1992 Davis Cup World Group qualifying round =

The 1992 Davis Cup World Group qualifying round was held from 25 to 27 September. They were the main play-offs of the 1992 Davis Cup. The winners of the playoffs advanced to the 1993 Davis Cup World Group, and the losers were relegated to their respective Zonal Regions I.

In response to the Yugoslav Wars and following the adoption of United Nations Security Council Resolution 757 in May 1992, Yugoslavia was barred from competing in international sporting competition. This resulted in the Yugoslav team being disqualified from this and future Davis Cups, and their qualifying round tie against Cuba was defaulted. Cuba therefore qualified for the 1993 Davis Cup World Group.

== Teams ==
Bold indicates team had qualified for the 1993 Davis Cup World Group.

From World Group

- Argentina
- Belgium
- Canada
- **Germany**
- Great Britain
- **Netherlands**
- **Spain**
- Yugoslavia

From Americas Group I

- **Cuba**
- Uruguay

From Asia/Oceania Group I

- **India**
- South Korea

From Europe/Africa Group I

- **Austria**
- **CIS**
- **Denmark**
- Israel

== Results summary ==
Date: 25–27 September

The eight losing teams in the World Group first round ties and eight winners of the Zonal Group I final round ties competed in the World Group qualifying round for spots in the 1993 World Group.

Home team	Score	Visiting team	Location	Venue	Door	Surface	Ref.
**Denmark**	3-2	Argentina	Aarhus	Aarhus Idrætspark	Indoor	Carpet	
Canada	1-3	**Austria**	Vancouver	Hollyburn Country Club	Outdoor	Grass	
**Germany**	5-0	Belgium	Essen	Grugahalle	Indoor	Carpet	
**Cuba**	w/o	Yugoslavia	—	—	—	—	
**Spain**	3-0	Israel	Avilés	Real Club de Tenis Avilés	Outdoor	Clay	
**India**	4-1	Great Britain	New Delhi	Delhi Lawn Tennis Association Complex	Outdoor	Grass	
**CIS**	5-0	South Korea	Moscow	Olympic Stadium	Indoor	Carpet	
**Netherlands**	4-1	Uruguay	The Hague	Stadion Houtrust	Indoor	Carpet	

- Germany, Netherlands and Spain remain in the World Group in 1993.
- Austria, CIS, Cuba, Denmark and India are promoted to the World Group in 1993.
- Israel, South Korea and Uruguay remain in Zonal Group I in 1993.
- Argentina, Belgium, Canada and Great Britain are relegated to Zonal Group I in 1993.

== Qualifying results ==
=== Denmark vs. Argentina ===
Denmark
3
Aarhus Idrætspark, Aarhus, Denmark
25–27 September 1992
Carpet (indoors)

Argentina
2

			1	2	3	4	5
1	(Denmark) (Argentina)	Frederik Fetterlein; **Alberto Mancini**	**6**; 2	**7**; 5	2; **6**	1; **6**	5; **7**
2	(Denmark) (Argentina)	**Kenneth Carlsen**; Gabriel Markus	6^{4} **7^{7}**	**6**; 4	**6**; 3	**6**; 1
3	(Denmark) (Argentina)	**Kenneth Carlsen / Morten Christensen**; Javier Frana / Christian Miniussi	**6**; 4	**7^{7}** 6^{5}	**6**; 3
4	(Denmark) (Argentina)	**Kenneth Carlsen**; Alberto Mancini	**6**; 4	3; **6**	**6**; 3	**7^{7}** 6^{3}
5	(Denmark) (Argentina)	Morten Christensen; **Gabriel Markus**	4; **6**	**6**; 4	5; **7**

=== Canada vs. Austria ===
Canada
1
Hollyburn Country Club, Vancouver, Canada
25–27 September 1992
Grass

Austria
3

			1	2	3	4	5
1	(Canada) (Austria)	Daniel Nestor; **Alex Antonitsch**	4; **6**	4; **6**	**6**; 3	2; **6**
2	(Canada) (Austria)	**Grant Connell**; Thomas Prerovsky	**7^{7}** 6^{4}	**7^{8}** 6^{6}	**6**; 2
3	(Canada) (Austria)	Grant Connell / Glenn Michibata; **Alex Antonitsch / Gerald Mandl**	2; **6**	6^{1} **7^{7}**	**6**; 4	**6**; 3	3; **6**
4	(Canada) (Austria)	Grant Connell; **Alex Antonitsch**	2; **6**	4; **6**	6^{3} **7^{7}**
5	(Canada) (Austria)	Daniel Nestor; Thomas Prerovsky	4; **6**	**7^{8}** 6^{6}				**not** **completed**

=== Germany vs. Belgium ===
Germany
5
Grugahalle, Essen, Germany
25–27 September 1992
Carpet (indoors)

Belgium
0

			1	2	3	4	5
1	(Germany) (Belgium)	**Michael Stich**; Bart Wuyts	**6**; 3	**6**; 4	**6**; 4
2	(Germany) (Belgium)	**Boris Becker**; Filip Dewulf	**6**; 4	**6**; 4	**6**; 4
3	(Germany) (Belgium)	**Boris Becker / Michael Stich**; Filip Dewulf / Eduardo Masso	**7^{7}** 6^{5}	**6**; 2	**7**; 5
4	(Germany) (Belgium)	**Markus Zoecke**; Bart Wuyts	**6**; 2	**6**; 2
5	(Germany) (Belgium)	**Michael Stich**; Filip Dewulf	**6**; 4	4; **6**	**6**; 4

=== Spain vs. Israel ===
Spain
3
Real Club de Tenis Avilés, Avilés, Spain
25–27 September 1992
Clay

Israel
0

			1	2	3	4	5
1	(Spain) (Israel)	**Jordi Arrese**; Gilad Bloom	**6**; 1	**7**; 5	**6**; 4
2	(Spain) (Israel)	**Carlos Costa**; Eyal Ran	**6**; 2	**7**; 5	**6**; 0
3	(Spain) (Israel)	**Sergio Casal / Emilio Sánchez**; Gilad Bloom / Shahar Perkiss	4; **6**	**6**; 2	**7^{7}** 6^{5}	3; **6**	**6**; 2
4	(Spain) (Israel)	Carlos Costa; Gilad Bloom						**not** **played**
5	(Spain) (Israel)	Jordi Arrese; Eyal Ran						**not** **played**

=== India vs. Great Britain ===
India
4
Delhi Lawn Tennis Association Complex, New Delhi, India
25–27 September 1992
Grass

Great Britain
1

			1	2	3	4	5
1	(India) (United Kingdom)	**Leander Paes**; Jeremy Bates	**6**; 2	6^{3} **7^{7}**	**7**; 5	**6**; 1
2	(India) (United Kingdom)	**Ramesh Krishnan**; Mark Petchey	**6**; 3	3; **6**	**6**; 3	6^{2} **7^{7}**	**6**; 1
3	(India) (United Kingdom)	**Ramesh Krishnan / Leander Paes**; Neil Broad / Mark Petchey	**6**; 4	3; **6**	**6**; 3	**6**; 1
4	(India) (United Kingdom)	Gaurav Natekar; **Chris Wilkinson**	3; **6**	1; **6**
5	(India) (United Kingdom)	**Leander Paes**; Mark Petchey	**6**; 2	**6**; 4

=== CIS vs. South Korea ===
CIS
5
Olympic Stadium, Moscow, Russia
25–27 September 1992
Carpet (indoors)

South Korea
0

			1	2	3	4	5
1	(Commonwealth of Independent States) (South Korea)	**Andrei Cherkasov**; Shin Han-cheol	**6**; 2	**6**; 4	**6**; 0
2	(Commonwealth of Independent States) (South Korea)	**Alexander Volkov**; Chang Eui-jong	**6**; 2	**6**; 2	**6**; 2
3	(Commonwealth of Independent States) (South Korea)	**Andrei Cherkasov / Andrei Olhovskiy**; Kim Chi-wan / Kim Jae-sik	**6**; 2	**6**; 4	**7**; 5
4	(Commonwealth of Independent States) (South Korea)	**Alexander Volkov**; Shin Han-cheol	**6**; 4	**7**; 5
5	(Commonwealth of Independent States) (South Korea)	**Andrei Cherkasov**; Chang Eui-jong	**7**; 5	**6**; 3

=== Netherlands vs. Uruguay ===
Netherlands
4
Stadion Houtrust, The Hague, Netherlands
25–27 September 1992
Carpet (indoors)

Uruguay
1

			1	2	3	4	5
1	(Netherlands) (Uruguay)	**Richard Krajicek**; Diego Pérez	**6**; 2	**6**; 4	**7^{7}** 6^{5}
2	(Netherlands) (Uruguay)	Paul Haarhuis; **Marcelo Filippini**	**6**; 3	6^{8} **7^{10}**	**6**; 1	1; **6**	1; **6**
3	(Netherlands) (Uruguay)	**Paul Haarhuis / Mark Koevermans**; Marcelo Filippini / Diego Pérez	**7**; 5	**6**; 2	**6**; 4
4	(Netherlands) (Uruguay)	**Richard Krajicek**; Marcelo Filippini	**7**; 5	**7^{7}** 6^{3}	**6**; 3
5	(Netherlands) (Uruguay)	**Paul Haarhuis**; Victor Caldarelli	**6**; 4	3; **6**	**6**; 3
