= 1993 Rosmalen Grass Court Championships =

- Date: 7–13 June
- Edition: 4th
- Category: ATP World Series
- Draw: 32S / 16D
- Prize money: $275,000
- Surface: Grass / outdoor
- Location: Rosmalen, Netherlands

Champions

Singles
- (France) Arnaud Boetsch

Doubles
- (United States) Jonathan Stark / (United States) Patrick McEnroe
← 1992 ·	Rosmalen Grass Court Championships	· 1994 →

The 1993 Continental Grass Court Championships was an ATP-tennis tournament held in Rosmalen, Netherlands and was played on outdoor grass courts. It was the fourth edition of the tournament and was held from June 7 through June 13, 1993. Arnaud Boetsch won the singles title.

== Finals ==
=== Singles ===
(France) Arnaud Boetsch defeated (Australia) Wally Masur 3–6, 6–3, 6–3

=== Doubles ===
(United States) Jonathan Stark / (United States) Patrick McEnroe defeated (South Africa) David Adams / (Russia) Andrei Olhovskiy 7–6, 1–6, 6–4
