= 1990 Volvo U.S. National Indoor =

- Date: February 26 – March 4
- Edition: 20th
- Category: World Series
- Draw: 48S / 24D
- Prize money: $225,000
- Surface: Carpet / indoor
- Location: Memphis, U.S.

Champions

Singles
- (West Germany) Michael Stich

Doubles
- (Australia) Darren Cahill / (Australia) Mark Kratzmann
- U.S. National Indoor Championships

The 1990 Volvo U.S. National Indoor (known as such in 1990 for sponsorship reasons) was a tennis tournament played on indoor carpet courts. It was the 20th edition of the event known that year as the Volvo U.S. National Indoor, and was part of the ATP World Series of the 1990 ATP Tour. It took place in Memphis, Tennessee, United States, from February 26 to March 4, 1990. Unseeded Michael Stich won the singles title.

== Finals ==
=== Singles ===
(West Germany) Michael Stich defeated (Australia) Wally Masur, 6–7^{(5–7)}, 6–4, 7–6^{(7–1)}

- It was Stich's first singles title of his career.

=== Doubles ===
(Australia) Darren Cahill / (Australia) Mark Kratzmann defeated (West Germany) Udo Riglewski / (West Germany) Michael Stich, 7–5, 6–2

- It was Cahill's first title of the year, and the 10th of his career. It was Kratzmann's second title of the year, and the 10th of his career.
