= 1992 Rosmalen Grass Court Championships – Doubles =

Doubles
- 1992 Rosmalen Grass Court Championships

Final
- Champions: (United States) Jim Grabb (United States) Richey Reneberg
- Runners-up: (United States) John McEnroe (Germany) Michael Stich
- Score: 6–4, 6–7, 6–4

Details
- Draw: 16 (2WC/1Q)
- Seeds: 4

Events
Singles	Doubles
← 1991 ·	Rosmalen Grass Court Championships	· 1993 →

Hendrik Jan Davids and Paul Haarhuis were the defending champions, but Haarhuis chose to compete at Florence in the same week. Davids teamed up with Libor Pimek and lost in the quarterfinals to Neil Borwick and Simon Youl.

Jim Grabb and Richey Reneberg won the title, by defeating John McEnroe and Michael Stich 6–4, 6–7, 6–4 in the final.

== Seeds ==
1. (Netherlands) Tom Nijssen / (Czechoslovakia) Cyril Suk (quarterfinals)
2. (United States) Jim Grabb / (United States) Richey Reneberg (champions)
3. (United States) Kent Kinnear / (United States) Sven Salumaa (first round)
4. (Netherlands) Hendrik Jan Davids / (Czechoslovakia) Libor Pimek (quarterfinals)

== Draw ==
=== Key ===
- Q = Qualifier
- WC = Wild card
- LL = Lucky loser
- Alt = Alternate
- SE = Special exempt
- PR = Protected ranking
- ITF = ITF entry
- JE = Junior exempt
- w/o = Walkover
- r = Retired
- d = Defaulted
- SR = Special ranking

=== Draw ===
First round
1	(Netherlands) T Nijssen (Czechoslovakia) C Suk	6	6
(Australia) C Limberger (United States) B Shelton	3	4
(United States) J McEnroe (Germany) M Stich	6	6
(United States) B Garnett (Sweden) T Svantesson	4	2
4	(Netherlands) HJ Davids (Czechoslovakia) L Pimek	3	6	7
(Sweden) H Holm (Netherlands) J Siemerink	6	3	5
(United States) C Beckman (United States) J Brown	6	3	6
(Australia) N Borwick (Australia) S Youl	4	6	7
(South Africa) D Adams (Russia) A Olhovskiy	6	7
(Netherlands) M Schapers (United States) J Stark	3	6
(Netherlands) J Eltingh (Netherlands) T Kempers	6	6
3	(United States) K Kinnear (United States) S Salumaa	3	4
Q	(Germany) P Baur (Netherlands) S Groen	3	6	6
WC	(Germany) M Naewie (Netherlands) F Wibier	6	3	7
WC	(Germany) C Saceanu (Germany) M Zoecke	6	3
2	(United States) J Grabb (United States) R Reneberg	7	6

Quarterfinals
1	(Netherlands) T Nijssen (Czechoslovakia) C Suk	6	1
(United States) J McEnroe (Germany) M Stich	7	6
4	(Netherlands) HJ Davids (Czechoslovakia) L Pimek	6	6
(Australia) N Borwick (Australia) S Youl	7	7
(South Africa) D Adams (Russia) A Olhovskiy	6	6
(Netherlands) J Eltingh (Netherlands) T Kempers	2	4
WC	(Germany) M Naewie (Netherlands) F Wibier	4	4
2	(United States) J Grabb (United States) R Reneberg	6	6

Semifinals
(United States) J McEnroe (Germany) M Stich	7	6	6
(Australia) N Borwick (Australia) S Youl	6	7	4
(South Africa) D Adams (Russia) A Olhovskiy	7	3	6
2	(United States) J Grabb (United States) R Reneberg	6	6	7

Final
(United States) J McEnroe (Germany) M Stich	4	7	4
2	(United States) J Grabb (United States) R Reneberg	6	6	6
