= 1994 Continental Grass Court Championships – Doubles =

Doubles
- 1994 Continental Grass Court Championships

Final
- Champions: (Netherlands) Stephen Noteboom (Netherlands) Fernon Wibier
- Runners-up: (Italy) Diego Nargiso (Sweden) Peter Nyborg
- Score: 6–3, 1–6, 7–6

Details
- Draw: 16
- Seeds: 4

Events
Singles	Doubles
- Rosmalen Grass Court Championships

Patrick McEnroe and Jonathan Stark were the defending champions, but McEnroe did not compete this year. Stark teamed up with Gary Muller and lost in the first round to tournament runners-up Diego Nargiso and Peter Nyborg.

Stephen Noteboom and Fernon Wibier won the title by defeating Nargiso and Nyborg 6–3, 1–6, 7–6 in the final.

== Seeds ==
1. (South Africa) Gary Muller / (United States) Jonathan Stark (first round)
2. (South Africa) David Adams / (Russia) Andrei Olhovskiy (quarterfinals)
3. (Netherlands) Hendrik Jan Davids / (South Africa) Piet Norval (quarterfinals)
4. (United States) Mike Bauer / (Australia) David Macpherson (first round)

== Draw ==
Key

- Q = Qualifier
- WC = Wild card
- LL = Lucky loser
- Alt = Alternate
- ITF = ITF entry
- PR = Protected ranking
- SR = Special ranking
- SE = Special exempt
- JE = Junior exempt
- JR = Junior Accelerator Programme entrant
- CO = College Accelerator Programme entrant
- NG = Next Gen Accelerator Program entrant
- w/o = Walkover
- r = Retired
- d = Defaulted

=== Draw ===
First round
1	(South Africa) G Muller (United States) J Stark	4	4
(Italy) D Nargiso (Sweden) P Nyborg	6	6
WC	(France) H Leconte (Russia) A Volkov	2	r
(South Africa) R Deppe (South Africa) S Kruger	1
4	(United States) M Bauer (Australia) D Macpherson	4	3
(Australia) W Masur (Czech Republic) D Vacek	6	6
(United States) B Devening (United States) B MacPhie	7	6
(Netherlands) J Eltingh (Netherlands) R Krajicek	6	4
WC	(Netherlands) S Noteboom (Netherlands) F Wibier	6	6
(Sweden) A Järryd (Norway) BO Pedersen	3	4
(United States) B Garnett (United States) TJ Middleton	1	6
3	(Netherlands) HJ Davids (South Africa) P Norval	6	7
Q	(Austria) A Antonitsch (South Africa) D Nainkin	4	4
(United States) J Grabb (Canada) S Lareau	6	6
(Germany) A Mronz (Venezuela) N Pereira	4	3
2	(South Africa) D Adams (Russia) A Olhovskiy	6	6

Quarterfinals
(Italy) D Nargiso (Sweden) P Nyborg	6	6
(South Africa) R Deppe (South Africa) S Kruger	4	2
(Australia) W Masur (Czech Republic) D Vacek	6	3
(United States) B Devening (United States) B MacPhie	7	6
WC	(Netherlands) S Noteboom (Netherlands) F Wibier	6	6
3	(Netherlands) HJ Davids (South Africa) P Norval	3	1
(United States) J Grabb (Canada) S Lareau	6	6	7
2	(South Africa) D Adams (Russia) A Olhovskiy	7	3	6

Semifinals
(Italy) D Nargiso (Sweden) P Nyborg	3	6	6
(United States) B Devening (United States) B MacPhie	6	3	4
WC	(Netherlands) S Noteboom (Netherlands) F Wibier	w	/	o
(United States) J Grabb (Canada) S Lareau

Final
(Italy) D Nargiso (Sweden) P Nyborg	3	6	6
WC	(Netherlands) S Noteboom (Netherlands) F Wibier	6	1	7
