= 1991 Volvo Tennis Indoor – Singles =

Singles
- 1991 Volvo Tennis Indoor

Final
- Champion: (Czechoslovakia) Ivan Lendl
- Runner-up: (Germany) Michael Stich
- Score: 7–5, 6–3

Details
- Draw: 48 (4WC/6Q/2LL)
- Seeds: 16

Events
Singles	Doubles
← 1990 ·	U.S. National Indoor Championships	· 1992 →

Michael Stich was the defending champion, but lost in the final to Ivan Lendl. The score was 7–5, 6–3.

== Seeds ==
All seeds receive a bye into the second round.

1. (Czechoslovakia) Ivan Lendl (champion)
2. (United States) Pete Sampras (Third round, retired)
3. (Ecuador) Andrés Gómez (second round)
4. (n/a)
5. (United States) Michael Chang (semifinals)
6. (United States) Jim Courier (third round)
7. (Germany) Michael Stich (final)
8. (Australia) Darren Cahill (quarterfinals)
9. (Czechoslovakia) Petr Korda (second round)
10. (United States) David Wheaton (second round)
11. (United States) Derrick Rostagno (semifinals)
12. (Brazil) Luiz Mattar (second round)
13. (Italy) Cristiano Caratti (quarterfinals)
14. (Australia) Wally Masur (third round)
15. (Netherlands) Mark Koevermans (quarterfinals)
16. (Netherlands) Paul Haarhuis (third round)

== Draw ==
=== Key ===
- Q = Qualifier
- WC = Wild card
- LL = Lucky loser
- Alt = Alternate
- ITF = ITF entry
- PR = Protected ranking
- SR = Special ranking
- SE = Special exempt
- JE = Junior exempt
- JR = Junior Accelerator Programme entrant
- CO = College Accelerator Programme entrant
- NG = Next Gen Accelerator Program entrant
- w/o = Walkover
- r = Retired
- d = Defaulted

=== Finals ===
Quarterfinals
1/WC	(Czechoslovakia) Ivan Lendl	7^{7}	6
8	(Australia) Darren Cahill	6^{2}	3
13/Q	(Italy) Cristiano Caratti	7^{7}	2	0
11	(United States) Derrick Rostagno	6^{4}	6	6
5	(United States) Michael Chang	6	7
LL	(United States) Jeff Tarango	3	5
7	(Germany) Michael Stich	6	6
15	(Netherlands) Mark Koevermans	4	2

Semifinals
1/WC	(Czechoslovakia) Ivan Lendl	6	6
11	(United States) Derrick Rostagno	3	2
5	(United States) Michael Chang	2	2
7	(Germany) Michael Stich	6	6

Final
1/WC	(Czechoslovakia) Ivan Lendl	7	6
7	(Germany) Michael Stich	5	3

=== Top half ===
==== Section 1 ====
First round
Q	(South Africa) W Ferreira	6^{5}	7^{7}	6
Q	(Mexico) L Herrera	7^{7}	6^{3}	3
(United States) J Arias	7^{7}	6^{7}	4
(South Africa) G Muller	6^{2}	7^{9}	6
(Argentina) H de la Peña	2	2
WC	(United States) P McEnroe	6	6
(India) R Krishnan	6^{6}	6	6^{5}
LL	(United States) B Garrow	7^{7}	3	7^{7}

Second round
1/WC	(Czechoslovakia) I Lendl	6	3	7
Q	(South Africa) W Ferreira	3	6	5
(South Africa) G Muller	3	1
16	(Netherlands) P Haarhuis	6	6
9	(Czechoslovakia) P Korda	6	1	5
WC	(United States) P McEnroe	2	6	7
LL	(United States) B Garrow	4	2
8	(Australia) D Cahill	6	6

Third round
1/WC	(Czechoslovakia) I Lendl	6	6
16	(Netherlands) P Haarhuis	2	1
WC	(United States) P McEnroe	3	4
8	(Australia) D Cahill	6	6

Quarterfinals
1/WC	(Czechoslovakia) I Lendl	7^{7}	6
8	(Australia) D Cahill	6^{2}	3

==== Section 2 ====
First round
(United States) T Mayotte	6	6
(Sweden) P Lundgren	3	4
(Italy) R Furlan	6^{2}	6	3
(France) G Raoux	7^{7}	1	6
(Australia) M Kratzmann	7^{7}	1	6
(Uruguay) M Filippini	6^{2}	6	4
(United States) K Curren	6	6
(Finland) V Paloheimo	4	1

Second round
3	(Ecuador) A Gómez	4	2
(United States) T Mayotte	6	6
(France) G Raoux	5	6^{8}
13/Q	(Italy) C Caratti	7	7^{10}
11	(United States) D Rostagno	7^{7}	7^{7}
(Australia) M Kratzmann	6^{5}	6^{4}
(United States) K Curren	3	4
6	(United States) J Courier	6	6

Third round
(United States) T Mayotte	6	6^{4}	2
13/Q	(Italy) C Caratti	3	7^{7}	6
11	(United States) D Rostagno	6	6
6	(United States) J Courier	1	4

Quarterfinals
13/Q	(Italy) C Caratti	7^{7}	2	0
11	(United States) D Rostagno	6^{4}	6	6

=== Bottom half ===
==== Section 3 ====
First round
(France) JP Fleurian	6	7
(United States) J Grabb	4	5
Q	(Canada) G Connell	6	7^{8}
(United States) S Davis	2	6^{6}
WC	(United States) D Goldie	6	4	7^{7}
(Peru) J Yzaga	3	6	6^{4}
(Finland) A Rahunen	6	2	6
WC	(United States) R Schmidt	4	6	4

Second round
5	(United States) M Chang	6	3	6
(France) JP Fleurian	4	6	2
Q	(Canada) G Connell	6	6
12	(Brazil) L Mattar	3	0
14	(Australia) W Masur	6^{1}	7	6
WC	(United States) D Goldie	7^{7}	5	2
(Finland) A Rahunen	3	6	2
LL	(United States) J Tarango	6	1	6

Third round
5	(United States) M Chang	7^{7}	6^{4}	6
Q	(Canada) G Connell	6^{5}	7^{7}	4
14	(Australia) W Masur	6^{3}	4
LL	(United States) J Tarango	7^{7}	6

Quarterfinals
5	(United States) M Chang	6	7
LL	(United States) J Tarango	3	5

==== Section 4 ====
First round
(Spain) T Carbonell	6	6^{5}	6^{3}
(Austria) A Antonitsch	3	7^{7}	7^{7}
(Sweden) M Wilander	7^{7}	5	6
Q	(South Africa) M Ondruska	6^{4}	7	2
(Israel) G Bloom	3	6	6
(South Africa) C van Rensburg	6	3	3
Q	(United States) C Garner	7^{7}	6
(United States) B Pearce	6^{5}	2

Second round
7	(Germany) M Stich	6	6
(Austria) A Antonitsch	2	3
(Sweden) M Wilander	6	6
10	(United States) D Wheaton	4	3
15	(Netherlands) M Koevermans	6	6
(Israel) G Bloom	3	4
Q	(United States) C Garner	6^{6}	3
2	(United States) P Sampras	7^{8}	6

Third round
7	(Germany) M Stich	6	6
(Sweden) M Wilander	3	3
15	(Netherlands) M Koevermans	2	1
2	(United States) P Sampras	6	1^{r}

Quarterfinals
7	(Germany) M Stich	6	6
15	(Netherlands) M Koevermans	4	2
