= 1994 Continental Grass Court Championships – Singles =

Singles
- 1994 Continental Grass Court Championships

Final
- Champion: (Netherlands) Richard Krajicek
- Runner-up: (Germany) Karsten Braasch
- Score: 6–3, 6–4

Details
- Draw: 32
- Seeds: 8

Events
Singles	Doubles
- Rosmalen Grass Court Championships

Arnaud Boetsch was the defending champion, but did not participate this year.

First-seeded Richard Krajicek won the tournament, beating Karsten Braasch in the final, 6–3, 6–4.

== Seeds ==
1. (Netherlands) Richard Krajicek (champions)
2. (Russia) Alexander Volkov (first round)
3. (Australia) Wally Masur (quarterfinals)
4. (United States) Jonathan Stark (second round)
5. (Germany) Karsten Braasch (final)
6. (France) Henri Leconte (semifinals)
7. (Czech Republic) Daniel Vacek (first round)
8. (Netherlands) Jacco Eltingh (quarterfinals)

== Draw ==
Key

- Q = Qualifier
- WC = Wild card
- LL = Lucky loser
- Alt = Alternate
- ITF = ITF entry
- PR = Protected ranking
- SR = Special ranking
- SE = Special exempt
- JE = Junior exempt
- JR = Junior Accelerator Programme entrant
- CO = College Accelerator Programme entrant
- NG = Next Gen Accelerator Program entrant
- w/o = Walkover
- r = Retired
- d = Defaulted

=== Finals ===
Semifinals
1	(Netherlands) Richard Krajicek	6	6
6	(France) Henri Leconte	4	4
5	(Germany) Karsten Braasch	6	6
Q	(South Africa) David Adams	4	4

Final
1	(Netherlands) Richard Krajicek	6	6
5	(Germany) Karsten Braasch	3	4

=== Top half ===
First round
1	(Netherlands) R Krajicek	6	6
(Germany) J Renzenbrink	1	4
(Sweden) A Järryd	3	6	4
(Venezuela) N Pereira	6	3	6
(Colombia) M Hadad	3	4
(Austria) A Antonitsch	6	6
WC	(Netherlands) S Schalken	6	6
7	(Czech Republic) D Vacek	4	4
4	(United States) J Stark	7^{7}	6
(Canada) S Lareau	6^{4}	4
(Australia) S Youl	6	6
(Ukraine) D Poliakov	3	2
Q	(Sweden) M Stadling	6	4	5
(Italy) D Nargiso	2	6	7
(Germany) H Dreekmann	1	3
6	(France) H Leconte	6	6

Second round
1	(Netherlands) R Krajicek	6	6
(Venezuela) N Pereira	3	1
(Austria) A Antonitsch	6	6
WC	(Netherlands) S Schalken	3	4
4	(United States) J Stark	5	6^{10}
(Australia) S Youl	7	7^{12}
(Italy) D Nargiso	2	7^{7}	4
6	(France) H Leconte	6	6^{3}	6

Quarterfinals
1	(Netherlands) R Krajicek	6	6
(Austria) A Antonitsch	4	2
(Australia) S Youl	6	3	6^{6}
6	(France) H Leconte	3	6	7^{8}

Semifinals
1	(Netherlands) R Krajicek	6	6
6	(France) H Leconte	4	4

=== Bottom half ===
First round
5	(Germany) K Braasch	6	6
(France) L Roux	4	2
(United States) J Grabb	7	6
(Russia) A Olhovskiy	5	3
(Italy) G Pozzi	5	2
(South Africa) D Nainkin	7	6
Q	(United States) L Gloria	1	4
3	(Australia) W Masur	6	6
8	(Netherlands) J Eltingh	6	7^{8}
Q	(Netherlands) H Jan Davids	3	6^{6}
(United States) R Matuszewski	6^{6}	3
WC	(Netherlands) F Wibier	7^{8}	6
(Germany) M Zoecke	7^{7}	7
(Germany) A Mronz	6^{5}	5
Q	(South Africa) D Adams	6	6
2	(Russia) A Volkov	3	4

Second round
5	(Germany) K Braasch	7	7
(United States) J Grabb	5	5
(South Africa) D Nainkin	2	4
3	(Australia) W Masur	6	6
8	(Netherlands) J Eltingh	6	6
WC	(Netherlands) F Wibier	4	2
(Germany) M Zoecke	2	6^{3}
Q	(South Africa) D Adams	6	7^{7}

Quarterfinals
5	(Germany) K Braasch	6	1	6
3	(Australia) W Masur	3	6	1
8	(Netherlands) J Eltingh	6^{4}	3
Q	(South Africa) D Adams	7^{7}	6

Semifinals
5	(Germany) K Braasch	6	6
Q	(South Africa) D Adams	4	4
