= 1992 Federal Express International =

- Date: February 10–16
- Edition: 22nd
- Category: Championship Series
- Draw: 48S / 24D
- Prize money: $630,000
- Surface: Hard / indoor
- Location: Memphis, Tennessee, TN, U.S.
- Venue: Racquet Club of Memphis
- Attendance: 56,594

Champions

Singles
- (United States) MaliVai Washington

Doubles
- (Australia) Mark Woodforde / (Australia) Todd Woodbridge
- U.S. National Indoor Championships

The 1992 Federal Express International (Note: Due to falling car sales Volvo ended its six-year sponsorship of the event. Pending the search for a new event sponsor Federal Express, headquartered in Memphis, agreed to sponsor the event for this edition only.), also known as the U.S. National Indoor Championships, was a men's tennis tournament held at the Racquet Club of Memphis in Memphis, Tennessee in the United States. The event was part of the Championship Series of the 1992 ATP Tour. It was the 22nd edition of the tournament and was held from February 10 through February 16, 1992, and played on indoor hard courts. MaliVai Washington, who was seeded 13th, won the singles title and earned $103,000 first-prize money.

== Finals ==
=== Singles ===
(United States) MaliVai Washington defeated (South Africa) Wayne Ferreira 6–3, 6–2

- It was Washington's first singles title of his career.

=== Doubles ===
(Australia) Mark Woodforde / (Australia) Todd Woodbridge defeated (United States) Kevin Curren / (South Africa) Gary Muller 7–5, 4–6, 7–6^{(7–5)}

- It was Woodforde's 2nd doubles title of the year and the 10th of his career. It was Woodbridge's 2nd doubles title of the year and the 10th of his career.
