= MaliVai Washington Kids Foundation =

United States nonprofit organization

- Formation: 1994
- Headquarters: Jacksonville, Florida, United States
- Executive Director/CEO: Terri Florio
- Key people: MaliVai Washington; Dow Peters; Lezita Davis
- Revenue: $1,188,161 (2015)
- Expenses: $1,036,975 (2015)
- Website: www.malwashington.com

The MaliVai Washington Kids Foundation is a United States foundation created in 1994 by former professional tennis player MaliVai Washington to model achievement and life skills to children through playing tennis. Centered in Jacksonville, Florida, the organization also provides tutoring and mentoring to its youth audience.

In the mid-2000s, the foundation broke ground on a 9,700-square-foot (900 m^{2}) Youth Tennis and Education Complex in Durkeeville that was expected to double the number of youth participants, previously about 1,000 per year.
