= 1990 Volvo U.S. National Indoor – Doubles =

Tennis tournament

Doubles
- 1990 Volvo U.S. National Indoor

Final
- Champions: (Australia) Darren Cahill (Australia) Mark Kratzmann
- Runners-up: (West Germany) Udo Riglewski (West Germany) Michael Stich
- Score: 7–5, 6–2

Details
- Draw: 24
- Seeds: 8

Events
Singles	Doubles
← 1989 ·	Volvo U.S. National Indoor	· 1991 →

Paul Annacone and Christo van Rensburg were the defending champions of 1990 Volve U.S. National indoor doubles. Annacone competed alongside Kelly Evernden but lost in the semifinals, while van Rensburg played with Kevin Curren and lost in the quarterfinals.
Darren Cahill and Mark Kratzmann won the title, defeating Udo Riglewski and Michael Stich 7–5, 6–2, in the final.

== Seeds ==
All seeds receive a bye into the second round.

1. (South Africa) Pieter Aldrich / (South Africa) Danie Visser (second round)
2. (United States) Kevin Curren / (South Africa) Christo van Rensburg (quarterfinals)
3. (Australia) Darren Cahill / (Australia) Mark Kratzmann (champions)
4. (South Africa) Neil Broad / (South Africa) Gary Muller (quarterfinals)
5. (United States) Paul Annacone / (New Zealand) Kelly Evernden (semifinals)
6. (Canada) Grant Connell / (Canada) Glenn Michibata (quarterfinals)
7. (Brazil) Cássio Motta / (United States) Tim Wilkison (semifinals)
8. (West Germany) Udo Riglewski / (West Germany) Michael Stich (final)

== Draw ==
=== Key ===
- Q = Qualifier
- WC = Wild card
- LL = Lucky loser
- Alt = Alternate
- SE = Special exempt
- PR = Protected ranking
- ITF = ITF entry
- JE = Junior exempt
- w/o = Walkover
- r = Retired
- d = Defaulted
- SR = Special ranking

=== Finals ===
Semifinals
8	(West Germany) Udo Riglewski (West Germany) Michael Stich	6	6^{4}	7
5	(United States) Paul Annacone (New Zealand) Kelly Evernden	3	7^{7}	5
3	(Australia) Darren Cahill (Australia) Mark Kratzmann	6	7^{7}
7	(Brazil) Cássio Motta (United States) Tim Wilkison	2	6^{3}

Final
8	(West Germany) Udo Riglewski (West Germany) Michael Stich	5	2
3	(Australia) Darren Cahill (Australia) Mark Kratzmann	7	6

=== Top half ===
First round
(Sweden) P Lundgren (Australia) W Masur	6^{2}	6	6
WC	(Sweden) N Kroon (Sweden) M Pernfors	7^{7}	4	1
(Sweden) F Nilsson (Italy) G Pozzi	3	3
(United States) S DeVries (United States) G Van Emburgh	6	6
(United States) K Flach (United States) D Flach	6	6
(Israel) G Blood (United States) B Pearce	4	4
(United States) B Page (United States) D Rostagno	6	6
(Canada) M Laurendeau (Puerto Rico) M Nido	4	2

Second round
1	(South Africa) P Aldrich (South Africa) D Visser	6	5	4
(Sweden) P Lundgren (Australia) W Masur	2	7	6
(United States) S DeVries (United States) G Van Emburgh	2	4
8	(West Germany) U Riglewski (West Germany) M Stich	6	6
4	(South Africa) N Broad (South Africa) G Muller	6	6
(United States) K Flach (United States) D Flach	1	2
(United States) B Page (United States) D Rostagno	4	4
5	(United States) P Annacone (New Zealand) K Evernden	6	6

Quarterfinals
(Sweden) P Lundgren (Australia) W Masur	3	7^{7}	2
8	(West Germany) U Riglewski (West Germany) M Stich	6	6^{5}	6
4	(South Africa) N Broad (South Africa) G Muller	2	7	4
5	(United States) P Annacone (New Zealand) K Evernden	6	5	6

Semifinals
8	(West Germany) U Riglewski (West Germany) M Stich	6	6^{4}	7
5	(United States) P Annacone (New Zealand) K Evernden	3	7^{7}	5

=== Bottom half ===
First round
(Sweden) R Båthman (Sweden) R Bergh	6	6
(United States) S Cannon (South Africa) B Talbot	2	3
WC	(United States) J Arias (United States) M Chang	3	6^{2}
(Uruguay) M Filippini (Uruguay) D Pérez	6	7^{7}
(France) J-P Fleurian (The Bahamas) R Smith	1	4
(South Africa) R Deppe (United States) S Giammalva Jr.	6	6
(Brazil) N Aerts (Brazil) F Roese	3	4
(United States) B Garnett (Sweden) T Svantesson	6	6

Second round
6	(Canada) G Connell (Canada) G Michibata	7^{8}	6^{5}	6
(Sweden) R Båthman (Sweden) R Bergh	6^{6}	7^{7}	4
(Uruguay) M Filippini (Uruguay) D Pérez	2	4
3	(Australia) D Cahill (Australia) M Kratzmann	6	6
7	(Brazil) C Motta (United States) T Wilkison	6	6
(South Africa) R Deppe (United States) S Giammalva Jr.	3	2
(United States) B Garnett (Sweden) T Svantesson	4	7^{8}	3
2	(United States) K Curren (South Africa) C van Rensburg	6	6^{6}	6

Quarterfinals
6	(Canada) G Connell (Canada) G Michibata	6^{4}	2
3	(Australia) D Cahill (Australia) M Kratzmann	7^{7}	6
7	(Brazil) C Motta (United States) T Wilkison	7	6
2	(United States) K Curren (South Africa) C van Rensburg	5	3

Semifinals
3	(Australia) D Cahill (Australia) M Kratzmann	6	7^{7}
7	(Brazil) C Motta (United States) T Wilkison	2	6^{3}
