= Thomas Prerovsky =

Austrian tennis player (born 1969)

- Country (sports): Austria
- Born: 15 February 1969 (age 56)
- Prize money: $12,551

Singles
- Career record: 1–3 (ATP Tour & Davis Cup)
- Highest ranking: No. 518 (30 Nov 1992)

Grand Slam singles results
- Wimbledon: Q1 (1993)

Doubles
- Career record: 0–2 (ATP Tour)
- Highest ranking: No. 532 (9 Sep 1991)

Thomas Prerovsky (born 15 February 1969) is an Austrian former professional tennis player.

== Tennis career ==
Prerovsky competed on the professional tour in the early 1990s and twice featured in the main draw of the Vienna Open, losing in the first round both times to Thomas Buchmayer. He was a member of the Austria Davis Cup team in 1992.

=== Davis Cup ===
Prerovsky made his Davis Cup debut against Finland in Helsinki and won a dead rubber singles over Pasi Virtanen, with Austria advancing to the World Group qualifiers.

In the qualifier against Canada in Vancouver he played his only live match, a singles rubber which he lost to Grant Connell. Austria however secured the tie in the first reverse singles and Prerovsky played the final rubber against Daniel Nestor, which was abandoned at one set all.

== Personal life ==
Prerovsky both coached and was in a relationship with WTA Tour player Barbara Schett for eight-years. The couple, who were reported to have been engaged, separated in 2000, attracting much tabloid interest.

== See also ==
- List of Austria Davis Cup team representatives
