= 1991 Rosmalen Grass Court Championships =

- Date: 10–16 June
- Edition: 2nd
- Category: ATP World Series
- Draw: 32S / 16D
- Prize money: $225,000
- Surface: Grass / outdoor
- Location: Rosmalen, Netherlands

Champions

Singles
- (Germany) Christian Saceanu

Doubles
- (Netherlands) Hendrik Jan Davids / (Netherlands) Paul Haarhuis
| ← 1990 · | Rosmalen Grass Court Championships | · 1992 → |

The 1991 Continental Grass Court Championships was an ATP men's tennis tournament held in Rosmalen, Netherlands. It was played on outdoor grass courts and was part of the ATP World Series. It was the second edition of the tournament and was held from 10 June until 16 June 1991. Unseeded Christian Saceanu won the singles title.

== Finals ==
=== Singles ===
(Germany) Christian Saceanu defeated (Netherlands) Michiel Schapers 6–1, 3–6, 7–5

- It was Saceanu's only singles title of the year and the 2nd and last of his career.

=== Doubles ===
(Netherlands) Hendrik Jan Davids / (Netherlands) Paul Haarhuis defeated (Netherlands) Richard Krajicek / (Netherlands) Jan Siemerink 6–3, 7–6
