= 1994 Continental Grass Court Championships =

- Date: 6–13 June
- Edition: 5th
- Category: ATP World Series
- Draw: 32S / 16D
- Prize money: $288,750
- Surface: Grass / outdoor
- Location: Rosmalen, Netherlands

Champions

Singles
- (Netherlands) Richard Krajicek

Doubles
- (Netherlands) Stephen Noteboom / (Netherlands) Fernon Wibier
- Rosmalen Grass Court Championships

The 1994 Continental Grass Court Championships, also known as Rosmalen Grass Court Championships, was a men's ATP-tennis tournament held in Rosmalen, Netherlands. The event was part of the World Series of the 1994 ATP Tour It was the fifth edition of the tournament and was played on outdoor grass courts and held from 6 June through 13 June 1994. Richard Krajicek won his second title of the year, and sixth of his career.

== Finals ==
=== Singles ===
(Netherlands) Richard Krajicek defeated (Germany) Karsten Braasch, 6–3, 6–4

=== Doubles ===
(Netherlands) Stephen Noteboom / (Netherlands) Fernon Wibier defeated (Italy) Diego Nargiso / (Sweden) Peter Nyborg, 6–3, 1–6, 7–6
