= MaliVai Washington =

American tennis player (born 1969)

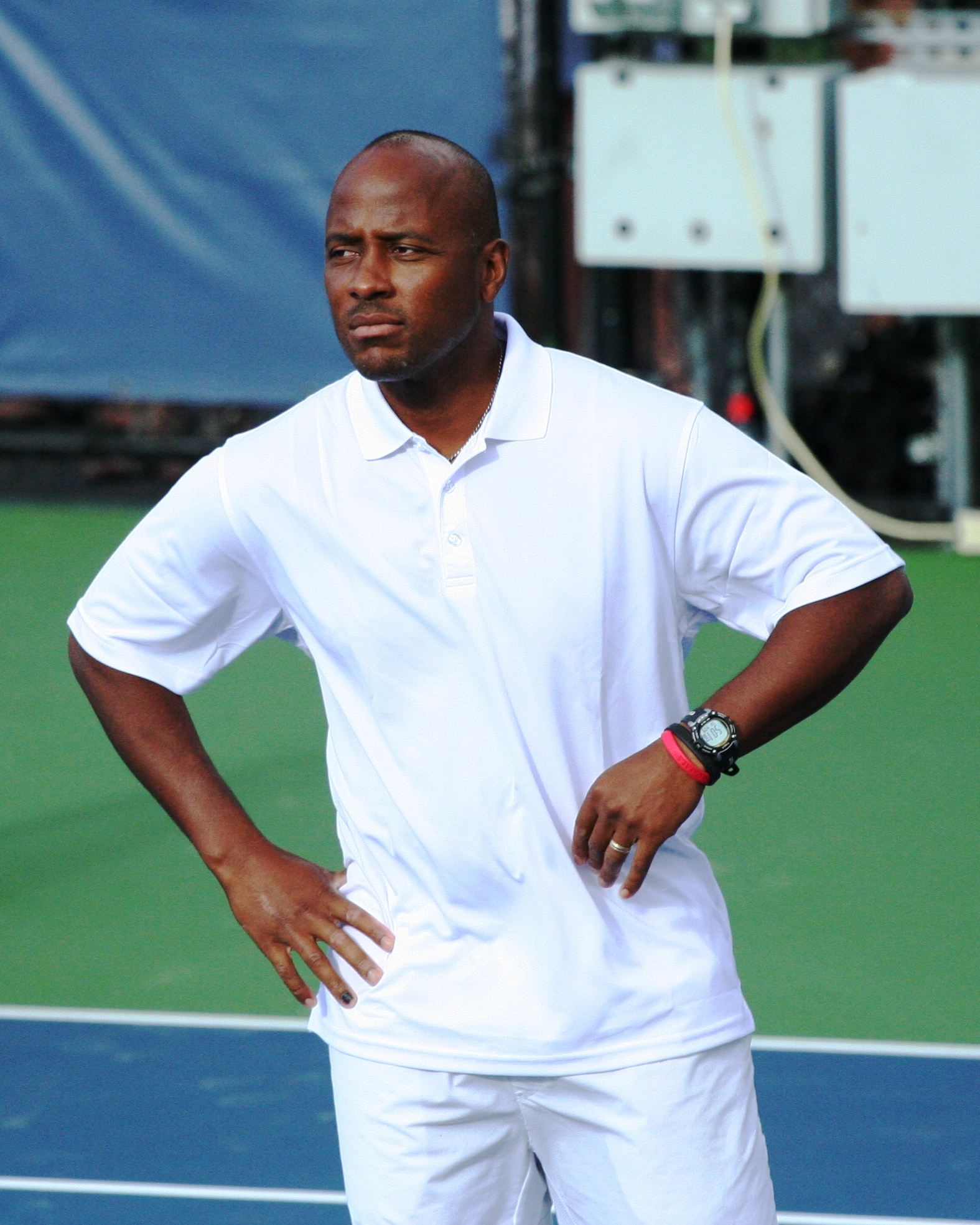
- Washington at the US Open, 2010
- Country (sports): United States
- Residence: Ponte Vedra Beach, Florida, US
- Born: June 20, 1969 (age 57) Glen Cove, New York, US
- Height: 5 ft 11 in (1.80 m)
- Turned pro: 1989
- Retired: 1999
- Plays: Right-handed (two-handed backhand)
- Prize money: $3,232,565

Singles
- Career record: 254–184 (58%)
- Career titles: 4
- Highest ranking: No. 11 (October 26, 1992)

Grand Slam singles results
- Australian Open: QF (1994)
- French Open: 4R (1993)
- Wimbledon: F (1996)
- US Open: 4R (1992)

Other tournaments
- Grand Slam Cup: QF (1996)
- Olympic Games: QF (1996)

Doubles
- Career record: 27–44 (38%)
- Highest ranking: No. 172 (April 20, 1992)

Grand Slam doubles results
- US Open: 2R (1991)

MaliVai "Mal" Washington (pronounced "Malivia", i.e. /mælɪˈviːə/ mal-ih-VEE-ə; born June 20, 1969) is an American former professional tennis player. He reached the men's singles final at Wimbledon in 1996, won four ATP titles and achieved a career-high singles ranking of world No. 11 in October 1992.

== Family ==
Washington began playing tennis aged five. Washington's younger sister, Mashona, is also a former top-50 professional tennis player. His younger brother, Mashiska, received All-America honors at Michigan State University, before joining the men's professional tour. MaliVai's older sister Michaela also played professionally.

== Amateur tennis ==
As a high school senior, Washington was coached by former ATP Tour participant Victor Amaya. For two seasons, Washington played tennis for the University of Michigan and was the top ranked college player in the United States at the end of his sophomore season. He left college two years into his studies to pursue a professional tennis career.

== Professional career ==
Washington turned professional in 1989. In 1990, while ranked no. 103, he defeated world number 2 Ivan Lendl in New Haven (6–3, 6–2).

During his breakthrough year in 1992, Washington won the Memphis title (defeating seventh-seeded Wayne Ferreira in the final) and the U.S. Men's Clay Court Championships in Charlotte, North Carolina, winning the final against Claudio Mezzadri. He reached a career high ranking of 11 in October.

In 1993, Washington reached his first Masters final in Miami, losing to Pete Sampras in straight sets.

At the 1994 Australian Open, Washington reached his first Grand Slam quarterfinal, after a win over second-seeded Michael Stich in the first round and a five-set victory against Mats Wilander in the fourth round. He also had wins over Michael Chang and Stefan Edberg during the US Summer hard court season, and won his third ATP-title in Ostrava in October.

In 1995, he beat world no. 1 Andre Agassi in the third round of the Essen Masters on his way to the final (where he lost to Thomas Muster).

Washington's biggest success at a Grand Slam event came in 1996 when he was a runner-up at the Wimbledon Championships. On his way to the final he defeated ninth-seeded Thomas Enqvist in the second round, and came back from a 1–5 deficit in the fifth set of the semifinal to beat Todd Martin, finally winning 10–8. Before the tournament had started, his odds of winning the title were 300–1. He lost the final to Richard Krajicek in straight sets. He gained revenge against Krajicek in the Grand Slam Cup in October later that year, beating him for the loss of just three games (6–1, 6–2).

Washington suffered from a recurring knee injury from the beginning of 1997, causing him to miss most of the 1997 and 1999 seasons, and precipitating his retirement in December 1999.

== Awards ==
In 2009 Washington won the ATP Arthur Ashe Humanitarian of the Year award, for his positive work through the MaliVai Washington Youth Foundation.

In 2015 Washington won the NJTL Founders' Service Award (The USTA's National Junior Tennis League), for his continued contribution since retirement to support education and tennis among children and young people (particularly those underprivileged).

== Grand Slam finals ==
=== Singles: 1 (1 runner-up) ===
Result	Year	Championship	Surface	Opponent	Score
Loss	1996	Wimbledon	Grass	(Netherlands) Richard Krajicek	3–6, 4–6, 3–6

== ATP Tour finals ==
=== Singles (4 titles, 9 runner-ups) ===
Legend
Grand Slam (0)
Tennis Masters Cup (0)
ATP Masters Series (0)
ATP Championship Series (1)
ATP Tour (3)

Result	W/L	Date	Tournament	Surface	Opponent	Score
Loss	0–1	Jan 1992	Auckland, New Zealand	Hard	(Peru) Jaime Yzaga	6–7^{(6–8)}, 4–6
Win	1–1	Feb 1992	Memphis, U.S.	Hard (i)	(South Africa) Wayne Ferreira	6–3, 6–2
Loss	1–2	Apr 1992	Tampa, U.S.	Clay	(Peru) Jaime Yzaga	6–3, 4–6, 1–6
Win	2–2	May 1992	Charlotte, U.S.	Clay	(Switzerland) Claudio Mezzadri	6–3, 6–3
Loss	2–3	Jun 1992	Manchester, England	Grass	(Netherlands) Jacco Eltingh	3–6, 4–6
Loss	2–4	Aug 1992	New Haven, U.S.	Hard	(Sweden) Stefan Edberg	6–7^{(4–7)}, 1–6
Loss	2–5	Jan 1993	Auckland, New Zealand	Hard	(Russia) Alexander Volkov	6–7^{(2–7)}, 4–6
Loss	2–6	Mar 1993	Miami, U.S.	Hard	(United States) Pete Sampras	3–6, 2–6
Win	3–6	Oct 1994	Ostrava, Czech Republic	Carpet (i)	(France) Arnaud Boetsch	4–6, 6–3, 6–3
Loss	3–7	Oct 1995	Ostrava, Czech Republic	Carpet (i)	(South Africa) Wayne Ferreira	6–3, 4–6, 3–6
Loss	3–8	Oct 1995	Essen, Germany	Carpet (i)	(Austria) Thomas Muster	6–7^{(6–8)}, 6–2, 3–6, 4–6
Win	4–8	Apr 1996	Bermuda	Clay	(Uruguay) Marcelo Filippini	6–7^{(6–8)}, 6–4, 7–5
Loss	4–9	Jul 1996	Wimbledon, England	Grass	(Netherlands) Richard Krajicek	3–6, 4–6, 3–6

=== Doubles (1 runner-up) ===
Result	W/L	Date	Tournament	Surface	Partner	Opponents	Score
Loss	0–1	Sep 1995	Bogotá, Colombia	Clay	(United States) Steve Campbell	(Czech Republic) Jiří Novák (Czech Republic) David Rikl	6–7, 2–6

== Performance timeline ==
Key
W	F	SF	QF	#R	RR	Q#	DNQ	A	NH

(W) winner; (F) finalist; (SF) semifinalist; (QF) quarterfinalist; (#R) rounds 4, 3, 2, 1; (RR) round-robin stage; (Q#) qualification round; (DNQ) did not qualify; (A) absent; (NH) not held; (SR) strike rate (events won / competed); (W–L) win–loss record.

Singles

Tournament	1988	1989	1990	1991	1992	1993	1994	1995	1996	1997	1998	1999	Career SR	Career win–loss
Grand Slam tournaments
Australian Open	A	A	A	1R	3R	4R	QF	1R	4R	4R	2R*	A	0 / 8	16–7
French Open	A	A	1R	1R	2R	4R	1R	2R	1R	A	A	A	0 / 7	5–7
Wimbledon	A	A	2R	2R	1R	2R	1R	1R	F	A	A	A	0 / 7	9–7
US Open	A	2R	2R	3R	4R	3R	2R	1R	2R	A	1R	A	0 / 9	11–9
Grand Slam SR	0 / 0	0 / 1	0 / 3	0 / 4	0 / 4	0 / 4	0 / 4	0 / 4	0 / 4	0 / 1	0 / 2	0 / 0	0 / 31	N/A
Annual win–loss	0–0	1–1	2–3	3–4	6–4	9–4	5–4	1–4	10–4	3–1	1–1	0–0	N/A	41–30
ATP Masters Series
Indian Wells	A	A	A	A	A	3R	1R	1R	A	A	2R	A	0 / 5	5–5
Miami	A	A	A	1R	2R	F	2R	4R	3R	A	2R	A	0 / 7	10–7
Monte Carlo	A	A	A	A	A	A	A	A	A	A	A	A	0 / 0	0–0
Rome	A	A	A	A	A	1R	A	3R	2R	A	A	A	0 / 3	3–3
Hamburg	A	A	A	A	A	A	A	2R	2R	A	A	A	0 / 2	2–2
Montreal/Toronto	A	A	1R	2R	SF	2R	QF	QF	3R	A	3R	A	0 / 8	13–8
Cincinnati	A	A	A	3R	1R	2R	3R	1R	2R	A	A	1R	0 / 7	6–6
Stockholm/Essen/Stuttgart	A	A	A	A	2R	SF	1R	F	2R	A	A	A	0 / 5	9–5
Paris	A	A	A	2R	2R	2R	A	2R	3R	A	A	A	0 / 5	4–5
Masters Series SR	0 / 0	0 / 0	0 / 1	0 / 4	0 / 5	0 / 7	0 / 5	0 / 8	0 / 8	0 / 0	0 / 3	0 / 1	0 / 42	N/A
Annual win–loss	0–0	0–0	0–1	4–4	3–5	13–7	7–5	15–8	6–7	0–0	4–3	0–1	N/A	52–41
Year-end ranking	329	199	93	50	13	23	30	26	20	258	178	1115	N/A	

* Washington withdrew prior to his second-round match at the 1998 Australian Open

== Wins over Top 10 players ==
Season	1990	1991	1992	1993	1994	1995	1996	Total
Wins	1	1	1	1	3	3	2	12

#	Player	Rank	Event	Surface	Rd	Score	Washington Rank
1990
1.	(Czech Republic) Ivan Lendl	2	New Haven, US	Hard	2R	6–2, 6–3	103
1991
2.	(United States) Brad Gilbert	8	Orlando, US	Hard	QF	6–2, 6–7^{(6)}, 6–2	85
1992
3.	(Croatia) Goran Ivanišević	5	New Haven, US	Hard	QF	6–4, 7–5	16
1993
4.	(Croatia) Goran Ivanišević	3	Stockholm Masters, Sweden	Carpet	QF	6–4, 7–5	33
1994
5.	(Germany) Michael Stich	2	Australian Open	Hard	1R	7-6^{(4)}, 6–3, 3–6, 6–2	26
6.	(United States) Michael Chang	6	Canada Masters	Hard	3R	6–4, 6–4	36
7.	(Sweden) Stefan Edberg	5	Long Island, US	Hard	3R	6–0, 3–6, 6–3	31
1995
8.	(Spain) Alberto Berasategui	8	Rome Masters, Italy	Clay	1R	7–5, 6–2	44
9.	(United States) Andre Agassi	1	Essen, Germany	Carpet	3R	4–6, 6–1, 6–1	54
10.	(Sweden) Thomas Enqvist	9	Essen, Germany	Carpet	QF	7–5, 6–4	54
1996
11.	(Sweden) Thomas Enqvist	9	Wimbledon	Grass	QF	6-4, 7–6, 6–3	20
12.	(Netherlands) Richard Krajicek	7	Grand Slam Cup, Germany	Carpet	3R	6–1, 6–2	20
