= Michael Stich =

German tennis player (born 1968)

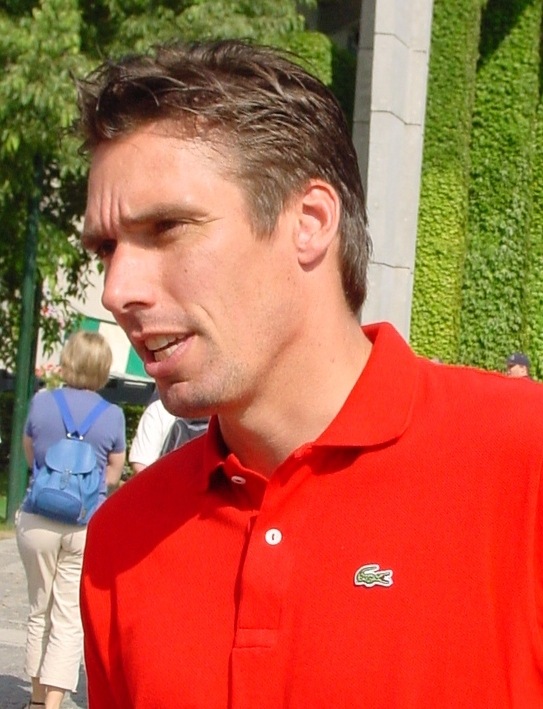
- Stich in 2003
- Country (sports): Germany (Note: West Germany prior to 1990)
- Residence: Elmshorn, Germany
- Born: 18 October 1968 (age 57) Pinneberg, West Germany
- Height: 1.93 m (6 ft 4 in)
- Turned pro: 1988
- Retired: 1997
- Plays: Right-handed (one-handed backhand)
- Prize money: $12,592,483
- Int. Tennis HoF: 2018 (member page)

Singles
- Career record: 385–176 (68.6%)
- Career titles: 18
- Highest ranking: No. 2 (22 November 1993)

Grand Slam singles results
- Australian Open: SF (1993)
- French Open: F (1996)
- Wimbledon: W (1991)
- US Open: F (1994)

Other tournaments
- Tour Finals: W (1993)
- Grand Slam Cup: W (1992)
- Olympic Games: 2R (1992)

Doubles
- Career record: 162–111 (59.3%)
- Career titles: 10
- Highest ranking: No. 9 (22 March 1991)

Grand Slam doubles results
- Australian Open: QF (1992)
- French Open: 3R (1989, 1991)
- Wimbledon: W (1992)
- US Open: QF (1991)

Team competitions
- Davis Cup: W (1993)
- Hopman Cup: W (1993)
Medal record
Olympic Games – Tennis
Gold medal – first place	1992 Barcelona	Men's doubles

Michael Detlef Stich (German pronunciation: [ˈmɪçaʔeːl ˈʃtɪç]; born 18 October 1968) is a German former professional tennis player. He was ranked world No. 2 in men's singles by the Association of Tennis Professionals (ATP), achieved in 1993, and No. 9 in men's doubles, achieved in 1991. Stich won 18 ATP Tour-level singles titles, including the 1991 Wimbledon Championships, as well as the 1993 ATP Tour World Championships and the 1992 Grand Slam Cup. He also won ten doubles titles, including the men's doubles title at the 1992 Wimbledon Championships, partnering with John McEnroe, and the gold medal in men's doubles 1992 Barcelona Olympics, partnering with Boris Becker. Stich was part of the victorious German team at the 1993 Davis Cup, and was also the singles runner-up at the 1994 US Open and the 1996 French Open.

== Personal life ==
Stich was raised in Elmshorn, Schleswig-Holstein.

Stich was married to the German actress Jessica Stockmann from 1992 to 2003.

In 2005, he married Alexandra Rikowski. They live in Hamburg.

== Career ==
He turned professional in 1988 and won his first top-level singles title in 1990 at Memphis, Tennessee.

Stich surprisingly won the men's singles title Wimbledon in 1991. He defeated the defending champion and world No. 1 Stefan Edberg in the semifinals, without breaking his service once. Then in the final, he beat his compatriot and three-time Wimbledon champion Boris Becker in straight sets. Edberg and Becker had contested the three previous Wimbledon finals.

In 1992, Stich teamed with John McEnroe to win the men's doubles title at Wimbledon in a five-set, five-hour final that stretched into Monday (the day after the tournament normally ends) and ended with a 19–17 set. No male player since has won both singles and doubles at Wimbledon. Then at the Summer Olympic Games in Barcelona, Stich teamed with Becker to win the men's doubles gold medal. Stich also won the 1992 Grand Slam Cup, defeating Michael Chang in the final.

A major highlight of 1993 for Stich came at the end-of-year ATP World Championships, where he was the only player in the 1990s history of the Championship tournament to claim the title undefeated, overcoming Pete Sampras in the final. Playing for Germany, Stich also won both the Davis Cup and the Hopman Cup in 1993.

Stich reached his second Grand Slam singles final at the 1994 US Open, where he lost in straight sets to Andre Agassi who was unseeded. Incidentally, Agassi had won the men's singles title at Wimbledon in 1992, the year after Stich accomplished that feat. Stich also helped Germany win the World Team Cup in 1994.

Stich upset defending champion Thomas Muster in four sets in the fourth round of the 1996 French Open en route to appearing in his third and final Grand Slam singles final, where he lost to Yevgeny Kafelnikov in straight sets. He also won his final career singles title that year at Antwerp.

Stich announced his retirement from the professional tour in 1997, after Wimbledon. His last run at Wimbledon started with a win over US top-ten player Jim Courier and ended with a five-set loss to Cédric Pioline in the semifinals, who went on to lose to Sampras in the final. His last doubles title came in 1997 at Halle.

Stich's all-round ability, both from the baseline and at the net, allowed him to become one of the few players to win both singles and doubles tournaments on all surfaces. He had a positive career head-to-head record against Sampras.

Since his retirement, he has devoted most of his time to his AIDS foundation. He also works as a tennis commentator for the BBC. In 2018, he was inducted into the International Tennis Hall of Fame.

== Grand Slam finals ==
=== Singles: 3 (1–2) ===
Result	Year	Championship	Surface	Opponent	Score
Win	1991	Wimbledon	Grass	(Germany) Boris Becker	6–4, 7–6^{(7–4)}, 6–4
Loss	1994	US Open	Hard	(United States) Andre Agassi	1–6, 6–7^{(5–7)}, 5–7
Loss	1996	French Open	Clay	(Russia) Yevgeny Kafelnikov	6–7^{(4–7)}, 5–7, 6–7^{(4–7)}

=== Doubles: 1 (1–0) ===
Result	Year	Championship	Surface	Partner	Opponents	Score
Win	1992	Wimbledon	Grass	(United States) John McEnroe	(United States) Jim Grabb (United States) Richey Reneberg	5–7, 7–6^{(7–5)}, 3–6, 7–6^{(7–5)}, 19–17

== Other significant finals ==
=== Year-end championships finals ===
==== Singles: 1 (1–0) ====
Result	Year	Championship	Surface	Opponent	Score
Win	1993	ATP Tour World Championships	Carpet (i)	(United States) Pete Sampras	7–6^{(7–3)}, 2–6, 7–6^{(9–7)}, 6–2

=== Grand Slam Cup finals: 2 (1–1) ===
Result	Year	Championship	Surface	Opponent	Score
Win	1992	Grand Slam Cup	Carpet (i)	(United States) Michael Chang	6–2, 6–3, 6–2
Loss	1993	Grand Slam Cup	Carpet (i)	(Czechoslovakia) Petr Korda	6–2, 4–6, 6–7^{(5–7)}, 6–2, 9–11

=== Olympic men's doubles final ===
Result	Year	Tournament	Surface	Partner	Opponents	Score
Gold	1992	Barcelona Olympics	Clay	(Germany) Boris Becker	(South Africa) Wayne Ferreira (South Africa) Piet Norval	7–6^{(7–5)}, 4–6, 7–6^{(7–5)}, 6–3

=== Masters Series finals ===
==== Singles: 3 (2–1) ====
Result	Year	Tournament	Surface	Opponent	Score
Loss	1992	Hamburg	Clay	(Sweden) Stefan Edberg	7–5, 4–6, 1–6
Win	1993	Hamburg	Clay	(Russia) Andrei Chesnokov	6–3, 6–7^{(1–7)}, 7–6^{(9–7)}, 6–4
Win	1993	Stockholm	Carpet (i)	(Croatia) Goran Ivanišević	4–6, 7–6^{(8–6)}, 7–6^{(7–3)}, 6–2

==== Doubles: 3 (1–2) ====
Result	Year	Tournament	Surface	Partner	Opponents	Score
Loss	1990	Hamburg	Clay	(Germany) Udo Riglewski	(Spain) Sergi Bruguera (United States) Jim Courier	6–7, 2–6
Win	1992	Monte Carlo	Clay	(Germany) Boris Becker	(Czechoslovakia) Petr Korda (Czechoslovakia) Karel Nováček	3–6, 6–1, 6–4
Loss	1992	Hamburg	Clay	(Germany) Carl-Uwe Steeb	(Spain) Sergio Casal (Spain) Emilio Sánchez	7–5, 4–6, 3–6

== Career finals ==
=== Singles: 31 (18 wins / 13 losses) ===
Legend Grand Slam (1–2) Year-end championships (1–0) Grand Slam Cup (1–1) ATP Masters Series (2–1) ATP Championship Series (3–3) ATP World Series (10–6)	Finals by surface Hard (4–4) Grass (4–1) Clay (3–5) Carpet (7–3)

Result	W-L	Date	Tournament	Surface	Opponent	Score
Win	1–0	Mar 1990	Memphis, US	Hard	(Australia) Wally Masur	6–7^{(5–7)}, 6–4, 7–6^{(7–1)}
Loss	1–1	Jan 1991	Adelaide, Australia	Hard	(Sweden) Nicklas Kulti	3–6, 6–1, 2–6
Loss	1–2	Jan 1991	Sydney, Australia	Hard	(France) Guy Forget	3–6, 4–6
Loss	1–3	Feb 1991	Memphis, US	Hard (i)	(Czech Republic) Ivan Lendl	5–7, 3–6
Win	2–3	Jul 1991	Wimbledon, UK	Grass	(Germany) Boris Becker	6–4, 7–6^{(7–4)}, 6–4
Win	3–3	Jul 1991	Stuttgart Outdoor, Germany	Clay	(Argentina) Alberto Mancini	1–6, 7–6^{(11–9)}, 6–4, 6–2
Win	4–3	Aug 1991	Schenectady, US	Hard	(Spain) Emilio Sánchez	6–2, 6–4
Win	5–3	Oct 1991	Vienna, Austria	Carpet (i)	(Netherlands) Jan Siemerink	6–4, 6–4, 6–4
Loss	5–4	May 1992	Hamburg, Germany	Clay	(Sweden) Stefan Edberg	7–5, 4–6, 1–6
Win	6–4	Jun 1992	Rosmalen, Netherlands	Grass	(United States) Jonathan Stark	6–4, 7–5
Win	7–4	Dec 1992	Grand Slam Cup, Munich	Carpet (i)	(United States) Michael Chang	6–2, 6–3, 6–2
Win	8–4	Feb 1993	Stuttgart, Germany	Carpet (i)	(Netherlands) Richard Krajicek	4–6, 7–5, 7–6^{(7–4)}, 3–6, 7–5
Loss	8–5	May 1993	Munich, Germany	Clay	(United States) Ivan Lendl	6–7^{(2–7)}, 3–6
Win	9–5	May 1993	Hamburg, Germany	Clay	(Russia) Andrei Chesnokov	6–3, 6–7^{(1–7)}, 7–6^{(9–7)}, 6–4
Win	10–5	Jun 1993	London (Queen's Club), UK	Grass	(South Africa) Wayne Ferreira	6–3, 6–4
Loss	10–6	Jul 1993	Stuttgart, Germany	Clay	(Sweden) Magnus Gustafsson	3–6, 4–6, 6–3, 6–4, 4–6
Win	11–6	Aug 1993	Basel, Switzerland	Hard (i)	(Sweden) Stefan Edberg	6–4, 6–7^{(5–7)}, 6–3, 6–2
Win	12–6	Nov 1993	Stockholm, Sweden	Carpet (i)	(Croatia) Goran Ivanišević	4–6, 7–6^{(8–6)}, 7–6^{(7–3)}, 6–2
Win	13–6	Nov 1993	ATP Tour World Championships, Frankfurt	Carpet (i)	(United States) Pete Sampras	7–6^{(7–3)}, 2–6, 7–6^{(9–7)}, 6–2
Loss	13–7	Dec 1993	Grand Slam Cup, Munich	Carpet (i)	(Czech Republic) Petr Korda	6–2, 4–6, 6–7^{(5–7)}, 6–2, 9–11
Win	14–7	Feb 1994	Rotterdam, Netherlands	Carpet (i)	(South Africa) Wayne Ferreira	4–6, 6–3, 6–0
Win	15–7	May 1994	Munich, Germany	Clay	(Czech Republic) Petr Korda	6–2, 2–6, 6–3
Win	16–7	Jun 1994	Halle, Germany	Grass	(Sweden) Magnus Larsson	6–4, 4–6, 6–3
Loss	16–8	Sep 1994	US Open, New York	Hard	(United States) Andre Agassi	1–6, 6–7^{(5–7)}, 5–7
Loss	16–9	Oct 1994	Vienna, Austria	Carpet (i)	(United States) Andre Agassi	6–7^{(4–7)}, 6–4, 2–6, 3–6
Loss	16–10	Feb 1995	Stuttgart, Germany	Carpet (i)	(Netherlands) Richard Krajicek	6–7^{(4–7)}, 3–6, 7–6^{(8–6)}, 6–1, 3–6
Loss	16–11	May 1995	Munich, Germany	Clay	(South Africa) Wayne Ferreira	5–7, 6–7^{(6–8)}
Loss	16–12	Jun 1995	Halle, Germany	Grass	(Switzerland) Marc Rosset	6–3, 6–7^{(11–13)}, 6–7^{(8–10)}
Win	17–12	Aug 1995	Los Angeles, US	Hard	(Sweden) Thomas Enqvist	6–7^{(7–9)}, 7–6^{(7–4)}, 6–2
Win	18–12	Feb 1996	Antwerp, Belgium	Carpet (i)	(Croatia) Goran Ivanišević	6–3, 6–2, 7–6^{(7–5)}
Loss	18–13	Jun 1996	French Open, Paris	Clay	(Russia) Yevgeny Kafelnikov	6–7^{(4–7)}, 5–7, 6–7^{(4–7)}

=== Doubles: 16 (10 wins / 6 losses) ===
Legend Grand Slam (1–0) Tennis Masters Cup (0–0) Olympic Gold Medal (1–0) ATP Masters Series (1–2) ATP Championship Series (1–1) ATP World Series (6–3)	Finals by surface Hard (3–2) Grass (3–1) Clay (3–2) Carpet (1–1)

Result	W-L	Date	Tournament	Surface	Partner	Opponents	Score
Win	1–0	Oct 1989	Basel, Switzerland	Hard (i)	(Germany) Udo Riglewski	(Italy) Omar Camporese (Switzerland) Claudio Mezzadri	6–3, 4–6, 6–0
Loss	1–1	Feb 1990	Memphis, US	Hard (i)	(Germany) Udo Riglewski	(Australia) Darren Cahill (Australia) Mark Kratzmann	5–7, 2–6
Win	2–1	May 1990	Munich, Germany	Clay	(Germany) Udo Riglewski	(Czech Republic) Petr Korda (Czech Republic) Tomáš Šmíd	6–1, 6–4
Loss	2–2	May 1990	Hamburg, Germany	Clay	(Germany) Udo Riglewski	(Spain) Sergi Bruguera (United States) Jim Courier	6–7, 2–6
Win	3–2	Jun 1990	Rosmalen, Netherlands	Grass	(Switzerland) Jakob Hlasek	(United States) Jim Grabb (United States) John McEnroe	7–6, 6–3
Loss	3–3	Aug 1990	Long Island, US	Hard	(Germany) Udo Riglewski	(France) Guy Forget (Switzerland) Jakob Hlasek	6–2, 3–6, 4–6
Win	4–3	Oct 1990	Vienna, Austria	Carpet (i)	(Germany) Udo Riglewski	(Mexico) Jorge Lozano (United States) Todd Witsken	6–4, 6–4
Win	5–3	Jan 1991	Memphis, US	Hard (i)	(Germany) Udo Riglewski	(Australia) John Fitzgerald (Australia) Laurie Warder	7–5, 6–3
Loss	5–4	Feb 1991	Philadelphia, US	Carpet (i)	(Germany) Udo Riglewski	(United States) Rick Leach (United States) Jim Pugh	4–6, 4–6
Win	6–4	Apr 1992	Monte Carlo, Monaco	Clay	(Germany) Boris Becker	(Czech Republic) Petr Korda (Czech Republic) Karel Nováček	6–4, 6–4
Loss	6–5	May 1992	Hamburg, Germany	Clay	(Germany) Carl-Uwe Steeb	(Spain) Sergio Casal (Spain) Emilio Sánchez	7–5, 4–6, 3–6
Loss	6–6	Jun 1992	Rosmalen, Netherlands	Grass	(United States) John McEnroe	(United States) Jim Grabb (United States) Richey Reneberg	4–6, 7–6, 4–6
Win	7–6	Jul 1992	Wimbledon, London	Grass	(United States) John McEnroe	(United States) Jim Grabb (United States) Richey Reneberg	5–7, 7–6, 3–6, 7–6, 19–17
Win	8–6	Aug 1992	Summer Olympics, Barcelona	Clay	(Germany) Boris Becker	(South Africa) Wayne Ferreira (South Africa) Piet Norval	7–6, 4–6, 7–6, 6–3
Win	9–6	Aug 1993	Los Angeles, US	Hard	(South Africa) Wayne Ferreira	(Canada) Grant Connell (United States) Scott Davis	7–6, 7–6
Win	10–6	Jun 1997	Halle, Germany	Grass	(Germany) Karsten Braasch	(South Africa) David Adams (South Africa) Marius Barnard	7–6, 6–3

== Performance timelines ==
=== Singles ===
Key
W	F	SF	QF	#R	RR	Q#	DNQ	A	NH

(W) winner; (F) finalist; (SF) semifinalist; (QF) quarterfinalist; (#R) rounds 4, 3, 2, 1; (RR) round-robin stage; (Q#) qualification round; (DNQ) did not qualify; (A) absent; (NH) not held; (SR) strike rate (events won / competed); (W–L) win–loss record.

Tournament	1988	1989	1990	1991	1992	1993	1994	1995	1996	1997	SR	W–L
Grand Slam tournaments
Australian Open	A	A	3R	3R	QF	SF	1R	3R	A	2R	0 / 7	16–7
French Open	A	2R	2R	SF	3R	4R	2R	4R	F	A	0 / 8	22–8
Wimbledon	A	1R	3R	W	QF	QF	1R	1R	4R	SF	1 / 9	25–8
US Open	A	1R	2R	QF	2R	1R	F	4R	2R	A	0 / 8	15–8
Win–loss	0–0	1–3	6–4	17–3	11–4	12–4	7–4	8–4	10–3	6–2	1 / 32	78–31
Year-end championships
ATP Finals	Did not qualify			RR	DNQ	W	Did not qualify				1 / 2	5–3
Grand Slam Cup	Not Held		DNQ	SF	W	F	DNQ		1R	DNQ	1 / 4	9–3
National representation
Summer Olympics	A	Not Held			2R	Not Held			A	NH	0 / 1	1–1
Davis Cup	A	A	QF	SF	PO	W	SF	SF	QF	A	1 / 6	21–9
Grand Prix			ATP Masters Series									
Indian Wells	A	A	A	SF	SF	2R	A	3R	A	A	0 / 4	8–4
Miami	A	A	2R	4R	A	4R	A	2R	A	A	0 / 4	5–4
Monte Carlo	A	A	1R	A	QF	2R	3R	2R	A	2R	0 / 6	5–6
Rome	A	A	A	1R	1R	A	QF	A	2R	A	0 / 4	4–3
Hamburg	A	1R	1R	SF	F	W	SF	3R	A	2R	1 / 8	18–7
Canada	A	A	2R	A	A	A	A	QF	A	A	0 / 2	3–2
Cincinnati	A	A	A	A	A	QF	SF	SF	A	A	0 / 3	8–3
Stockholm^{1}	A	A	A	2R	3R	W	QF	A	2R	A	1 / 5	9–4
Paris	A	A	QF	A	3R	QF	2R	A	1R	A	0 / 5	6–5
Win–loss	N/A	0–1	5–5	10–5	11–6	16–5	13–5	7–6	2–3	2–2	2 / 40	66–37
Career statistics
Titles	0	0	1	4	2	6	3	1	1	0	18	
Finals	0	0	1	7	3	9	5	4	2	0	31	
Year-end ranking	269	100	42	4	15	2	9	12	16	64		

^{1} Held as Stockholm Masters until 1994, Stuttgart Masters from 1995 onward.

=== Doubles ===
Tournament	1988	1989	1990	1991	1992	1993	1994	1995	1996	1997	SR	W–L
Grand Slam tournaments
Australian Open	A	A	1R	QF	1R	A	1R	A	A	A	0 / 4	3–4
French Open	A	3R	2R	3R	A	A	A	A	A	A	0 / 3	5–3
Wimbledon	A	1R	2R	1R	W	3R	SF	A	A	A	1 / 6	13–5
US Open	A	1R	1R	QF	SF	3R	A	A	A	A	0 / 5	9–5
Win–loss	0–0	2–3	2–4	8–4	10–2	4–2	4–2	0–0	0–0	0–0	1 / 18	30–17
National representation
Summer Olympics	A	not held			G	not held			A	NH	1 / 1	4–0
Davis Cup	A	A	QF	SF	PO	W	SF	SF	QF	A	1 / 6	14–2
Career statistics
Titles	0	1	3	1	3	1	0	0	0	1	10	
Finals	0	1	6	2	5	1	0	0	0	1	16	
Year-end ranking	216	73	27	27	16	76	89	156	359	206		

== Top 10 wins ==
Season	1987	1988	1989	1990	1991	1992	1993	1994	1995	1996	1997	Total
Wins	0	0	0	1	7	6	14	3	6	2	0	39

#	Player	Rank	Event	Surface	Rd	Score
1990
1.	(United States) Brad Gilbert	9	Paris, France	Carpet (i)	3R	6–4, 6–4
1991
2.	(Sweden) Stefan Edberg	1	Hamburg, Germany	Clay	QF	6–2, 7–6^{(7–4)}
3.	(Socialist Federal Republic of Yugoslavia) Goran Ivanišević	8	World Team Cup, Düsseldorf	Clay	RR	6–3, 6–4
4.	(United States) Jim Courier	4	Wimbledon, United Kingdom	Grass	QF	6–3, 7–6^{(7–2)}, 6–2
5.	(Sweden) Stefan Edberg	1	Wimbledon, United Kingdom	Grass	SF	4–6, 7–6^{(7–5)}, 7–6^{(7–5)}, 7–6^{(7–2)}
6.	(Germany) Boris Becker	2	Wimbledon, United Kingdom	Grass	F	6–4, 7–6^{(7–4)}, 6–4
7.	(United States) Jim Courier	3	Davis Cup, Kansas City	Clay (i)	RR	6–4, 7–5, 6–4
8.	(France) Guy Forget	7	Grand Slam Cup, Munich	Carpet (i)	QF	7–6^{(10–8)}, 6–4
1992
9.	(Germany) Boris Becker	4	Hamburg, Germany	Clay	SF	6–1, 6–1
10.	(United States) Pete Sampras	3	World Team Cup, Düsseldorf	Clay	RR	6–7^{(6–8)}, 6–2, 6–4
11.	(Sweden) Stefan Edberg	2	Grand Slam Cup, Munich	Carpet (i)	1R	7–6^{(7–4)}, 6–7^{(4–7)}, 8–6
12.	(Netherlands) Richard Krajicek	10	Grand Slam Cup, Munich	Carpet (i)	QF	7–6^{(7–4)}, 7–5
13.	(United States) Pete Sampras	3	Grand Slam Cup, Munich	Carpet (i)	SF	7–6^{(7–3)}, 7–6^{(7–5)}, 3–6, 7–6^{(7–2)}
14.	(United States) Michael Chang	6	Grand Slam Cup, Munich	Carpet (i)	F	6–2, 6–3, 6–2
1993
15.	(United States) Ivan Lendl	7	Hamburg, Germany	Clay	QF	6–3, 6–2
16.	(Sweden) Stefan Edberg	3	World Team Cup, Düsseldorf	Clay	RR	6–2, 6–0
17.	(Germany) Boris Becker	4	Queen's Club, United Kingdom	Grass	QF	6–4, 7–6^{(7–2)}
18.	(Czechoslovakia) Petr Korda	10	Wimbledon, United Kingdom	Grass	4R	7–6^{(7–4)}, 6–4, 7–6^{(7–3)}
19.	(Sweden) Stefan Edberg	5	Davis Cup, Borlänge	Clay (i)	RR	6–1, 6–1
20.	(Sweden) Stefan Edberg	5	Basel, Switzerland	Hard (i)	F	6–4, 6–7^{(5–7)}, 6–3, 6–2
21.	(Sweden) Stefan Edberg	6	Stockholm, Sweden	Carpet (i)	QF	1–6, 6–2, 6–4
22.	(Croatia) Goran Ivanišević	10	Stockholm, Sweden	Carpet (i)	F	4–6, 7–6^{(8–6)}, 7–6^{(7–3)}, 6–2
23.	(Ukraine) Andriy Medvedev	6	ATP Tour World Championships, Frankfurt	Carpet (i)	RR	6–3, 6–4
24.	(United States) Michael Chang	7	ATP Tour World Championships, Frankfurt	Carpet (i)	RR	4–6, 7–6^{(7–3)}, 6–2
25.	(United States) Jim Courier	2	ATP Tour World Championships, Frankfurt	Carpet (i)	RR	7–5, 6–4
26.	(Croatia) Goran Ivanišević	8	ATP Tour World Championships, Frankfurt	Carpet (i)	SF	7–6^{(7–2)}, 7–6^{(12–10)}
27.	(United States) Pete Sampras	1	ATP Tour World Championships, Frankfurt	Carpet (i)	F	7–6^{(7–3)}, 2–6, 7–6^{(9–7)}, 6–2
28.	(Sweden) Stefan Edberg	5	Grand Slam Cup, Munich	Carpet (i)	SF	2–6, 3–6, 6–3, 6–3, 6–1
1994
29.	(United States) Pete Sampras	1	World Team Cup, Düsseldorf	Clay	RR	3–6, 7–6^{(9–7)}, 6–2
30.	(Spain) Sergi Bruguera	6	World Team Cup, Düsseldorf	Clay	F	2–6, 6–4, 6–3
31.	(Spain) Sergi Bruguera	4	Davis Cup, Halle	Grass	RR	7–6^{(7–4)}, 5–7, 7–5, 6–2
1995
32.	(Croatia) Goran Ivanišević	5	Davis Cup, Karlsruhe	Hard (i)	RR	7–6^{(7–3)}, 4–6, 6–1, 6–4
33.	(Germany) Boris Becker	3	Stuttgart, Germany	Carpet (i)	SF	6–0, 6–3
34.	(Netherlands) Richard Krajicek	10	Davis Cup, Utrecht	Hard (i)	RR	3–6, 6–4, 6–4, 6–4
35.	(Sweden) Magnus Larsson	10	World Team Cup, Düsseldorf	Clay	RR	7–5, 7–6^{(7–5)}
36.	(United States) Pete Sampras	2	Cincinnati, United States	Hard	QF	6–7^{(5–7)}, 7–6^{(7–3)}, 6–1
37.	(Russia) Yevgeny Kafelnikov	6	Davis Cup, Moscow	Clay (i)	RR	6–1, 4–6, 6–3, 6–4
1996
38.	(Croatia) Goran Ivanišević	9	Antwerp, Belgium	Carpet (i)	F	6–3, 6–2, 7–6^{(7–5)}
39.	(Austria) Thomas Muster	2	French Open, Paris	Clay	4R	4–6, 6–4, 6–1, 7–6^{(7–1)}

== Record against No. 1 players ==
Stich's match record against players who have been ranked world No. 1.

Player	Years	Matches	Record	Win %	Hard	Clay	Grass	Carpet
(Australia) Patrick Rafter	1994–1995	2	2–0	100%	2–0	0–0	0–0	0–0
(Chile) Marcelo Ríos	1994	1	1–0	100%	1–0	0–0	0–0	0–0
(Sweden) Mats Wilander	1991	1	1–0	100%	1–0	0–0	0–0	0–0
(United States) Jimmy Connors	1990–1992	4	3–1	75%	2–1	1–0	0–0	0–0
(Sweden) Stefan Edberg	1991–1996	16	10–6	63%	1–3	5–1	1–0	3–2
(Austria) Thomas Muster	1992–1996	5	3–2	60%	0–0	2–2	0–0	1–0
(United States) Jim Courier	1990–1997	12	7–5	58%	2–2	1–2	2–0	2–1
(United States) Pete Sampras	1991–1995	9	5–4	56%	1–1	2–1	0–1	2–1
(United States) John McEnroe	1990–1992	2	1–1	50%	0–1	0–0	1–0	0–0
(Germany) Boris Becker	1990–1996	12	4–8	33%	0–1	1–0	2–1	1–6
(Russia) Yevgeny Kafelnikov	1993–1997	11	3–8	27%	1–1	1–4	0–1	1–2
(Czech Republic) / (United States) Ivan Lendl	1989–1993	7	1–6	14%	0–3	1–1	0–1	0–1
(United States) Andre Agassi	1990–1994	6	0–6	0%	0–3	0–1	0–0	0–2
Total	1989–1997	88	41–47	47%	11–16	14–12	6–4	10–15

== Notes ==
Awards
Preceded by (Germany) Boris Becker	German Sportsman of the Year; 1991	Succeeded by (Germany) Dieter Baumann
